= Steven Brooks (lacrosse) =

American lacrosse player (born 1984)

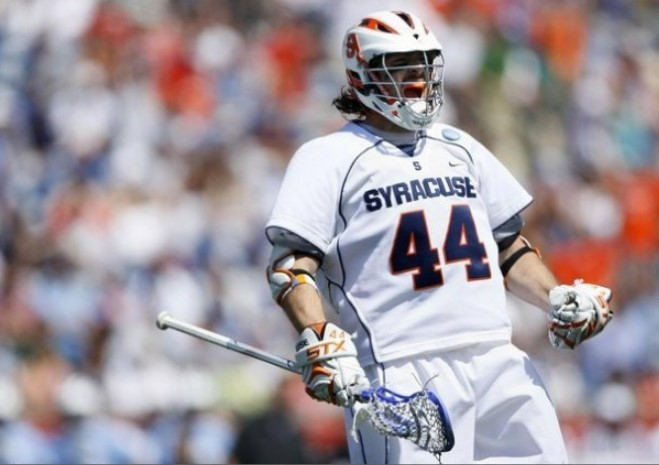

Personal information
- Nickname: Brooksie (Fastest shot: 108 mph)
- Nationality: American
- Born: 1984 (age 41–42) Illinois, U.S.
- Height: 6 ft 1 in (185 cm)
- Weight: 190 lb (86 kg; 13 st 8 lb)

Sport
- Position: Midfield
- Shoots: Left
- NCAA team: Syracuse University
- NLL draft: 22nd overall, 2008; Chicago Shamrox
- MLL draft: 6th overall, 2008; Chicago Machine
- MLL team: Florida Launch, Chesapeake Bayhawks, Chicago Machine
- PLL team: New York Atlas
- Pro career: 2008–2019

Steven Brooks (born 1984) is an American former professional lacrosse player and current professional head coach. A two-time NCAA champion at Syracuse University, a two-time Major League Lacrosse champion, and a two-time Premier Lacrosse League champion as a coach, Brooks is also a three-time Hall of Famer. He was selected sixth overall in the 2008 Major League Lacrosse Collegiate Draft by the Chicago Machine and later retired from the New York Atlas of the Premier Lacrosse League in 2019.

Brooks played high school lacrosse at Libertyville High School in Libertyville, Illinois, before completing a postgraduate year at Bridgton Academy. He played college lacrosse at Syracuse, where he earned first-team All-American honors and received the McLaughlin Award as the nation's top midfielder, while helping lead the Orange to two NCAA Division I championships.

In January 2020, immediately following his retirement, Brooks was named assistant coach of the New York Atlas in the PLL, becoming the first former PLL player to transition into a coaching role. As the team's offensive coordinator and assistant coach, he helped lead the Atlas to their first PLL Championship in 2025.

In January 2026, Brooks was named head coach of the Carolina Chaos of the Premier Lacrosse League becoming the first former Premier Lacrosse League player to serve as a head coach. In March 2026, Brooks led the Chaos to the 2026 PLL Championship Series title. With the victory, Brooks became the first coach in league history to win both the PLL Championship and the Championship Series back-to-back.

In recognition of his contributions to the sport, Brooks has been inducted into multiple halls of fame, including the Bridgton Academy Hall of Fame in 2023, the Libertyville High School Hall of Fame and the Illinois Sports Hall of Fame (both in 2025).

== Playing career ==
=== Collegiate Lacrosse ===
Brooks played college lacrosse at Syracuse University from 2003 to 2008. He won two NCAA Men's Lacrosse Championships while with the Syracuse Orange men's lacrosse, in 2004 and 2008. In 2008 Brooks was selected as a first-team All-American during his senior season and also won the McLaughlin Award as the nation's best midfielder. He ended his college career with a total of 67 Goals, 34 Assists, and 86 Ground Balls totaling 101 points.

=== Professional Lacrosse ===
2008: Chicago Machine; Brooks was drafted 6th overall by the Chicago Machine in the 2008 MLL Collegiate Draft. Brooks had a break out rookie season. He played in 15 games for the Machine recording 29 goals, 4 two-pointers, and 11 assists totaling 44 points, and adding 26 ground balls. He was named to the 2008 MLL All-Star team. He also competed in the 2008 Bud Light Skills fastest shot competition.

2009: Chicago Machine; 5 games into the 2009 season and his second season with the Machine he broke his foot against Boston. This injury sideline Brooks for the rest of the season.

2010: In 2010 Brooks played for the LXM Pro Tour league for Team STX.

2011: Chesapeake Bayhawks; Brooks was traded to the Bayhawks in February 2011. He played in 12 games for the Bayhawks, recording 11 goals, 2 two-pointers, and 5 assists totaling 18 points, and adding 8 ground balls. He was the Bud Light MVP for their game against Hamilton.

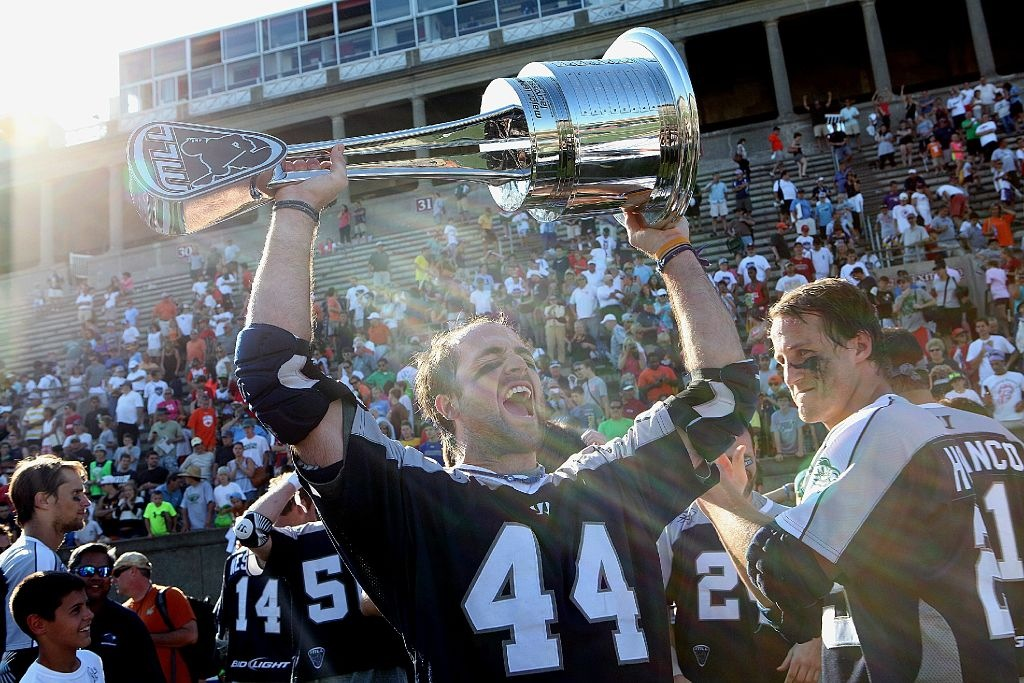
2012 MLL Champions

2012: Chesapeake Bayhawks; In 2012 he was a key contributor, recording 23 goals, 3 two-pointers, 10 assists, and 11 ground balls. He was the Bud Light MVP for their game against Denver. During the playoffs, he added another two goals and four assists helping the Bayhawks to win their fourth MLL Championship Title. Brooks was named to the 2012 MLL All-Star team. Brooks stuck the game-winning goal in the All-Star game to lead his Old School Team to victory. He also competed in the 2012 Bud Light Skills fastest shot competition, recording a 108 mph shot lefty and 102 mph righty.

2013: Chesapeake Bayhawks; In 2013 Brooks recorded 13 goals, 1 two-pointer, 8 assists, and 10 ground balls. In playoffs he totaled 1 goal and 2 ground balls. With 3 minutes to go in the semi-final championship game, Brooks stuck a goal to tie the game at 12, the Bayhawks then scored with 1 min to go to advance to the Championship game and win their 5th MLL Championship Title. Brooks was named to the 2013 MLL All-Star team and he also competed in the 2013 Bud Light Skills fastest shot competition at the All-Star game.

2014: Chesapeake Bayhawks; In 2014 Brooks recorded 6 goals, 1 two-pointer, 3 assists, and 3 ground balls. Brooks struggled with a knee injury throughout the season. He was traded to Florida Launch for the last four games of the season.

2014: Florida Launch; Brooks was traded to the Launch in July 2014 and played in four games. He had a standout performance totaling 10 goals, 1 two-pointer, 4 assists, and 2 ground balls. He scored two goals, including a two-point goal, and one assist against Denver (7/20) tallied three goals, two assists, and one groundball against Boston (7/26), three goals and an assist at Boston (8/2), and two goals at Ohio (8/9).

2015: Florida Launch; Brooks had a milestone year tallying his most goals in a season and hitting his 100th goal. Brooks played in 13 games for the Launch, recording a point in each contest. Tallied one assist and four groundballs at Chesapeake (4/19). Paced the Launch in the home opener versus Chesapeake (4/26) with a season-high four goals. Recorded two goals and two assists at Rochester (5/3) for a team-high four points with two groundballs. Provided a pair of goals in the first win of 2015 against Ohio (5/9). Eclipsed 100 career points on the road at Ohio with his first of three goals in the contest (5/24). Scored a goal and collected a groundball on the road at Boston (5/30). Logged a goal and assist on the road at New York (6/5). Scooped up a season-high four groundballs with three goals versus New York and made ESPN's Sports Center Top 10 plays at #8 with his goal from a behind the back pass from Casey Powell.(6/26). Scored first Launch goal versus Charlotte (7/3), ending the night with three scores and a groundball. Set a career-high for goals in a season with 24 versus Rochester (7/25), recording two goals and an assist for three points in the game.

2016: Florida Launch; Brooks played in 13 games for the Launch scoring a point in three out of the four contests. Logged two goals and a season high four groundballs in the home opener against Ohio (4/16). Scored a goal and accounted for one assist at Chesapeake (4/30). Recorded two points and three groundballs versus Charlotte (5/14). Tallied one assist and one groundball against Atlanta (5/21). Scored a goal and recorded an assist against Ohio (6/4). Recorded an assist against Denver (6/11). Scored a goal against Denver (7/4). Had a season high three points against the Lizards (7/14). Scored a goal against Charlotte (7/22). Scored a goal and an assist against Atlanta (7/23). Scored on a two-point shot along with three groundballs at home versus Rochester (7/30). Goal and assist in season finale at Boston (8/6).

2017: Florida Launch; Brooks was named Captain for 2017 season leading the Launch to their first ever play-off debut. Brooks began the season opener against the Boston Cannons on (4/23) with one goal. Tallied one assist on (4/29) against Rochester. Scored a goal against the Denver Outlaws on (5/13). Scored one goal and his first two-point goal of the season against the Rochester Rattlers (5/20). (6/17) against Atlanta, Brooks added one assist. (6/24) Brooks recorded his 100th game played in the MLL against Charlotte adding a goal in the win. (7/15) Brooks then scored a hat trick against the Chesapeake Bayhawks. Brooks recorded one ground ball and a goal in the game on (7/20) against Chesapeake, then scored another goal on the (7/22) game against Charlotte two days later. Scored two goals and tallied two assists accumulating to four points on the (7/29) game against Boston. Brooks led the Launch to their first ever play-off berth to the semi-finals.

2018: Florida Launch; Second season as Captain of the Florida Launch. Brooks started his 2018 campaign against Atlanta scoring one goal and picking up one ground ball. On 4/28 Brooks tallied three assists and two ground balls. On 5/10 against Boston, Brooks recorded one goal and picked up one ground ball. One 6/2 Brooks scooped up two ground balls against the Boston Cannons. At New York on 6/09, Brooks had one goal and one ground ball. Brooks tallied one goal and had one ground ball against Denver 6/16. On 7/7 vs Ohio Brooks recorded one goal. Brooks recorded one goal against Ohio to assist in the 13–12 win on 7/26. In the last two games of the season, Brooks scored one goal in each. In the 2018 season, Brooks recorded 11 points and picked up 10 ground balls after playing in every game for the Launch. Steven Brooks was named the Launch nominee for the MLL Dave Huntley Man of the Year Award at the 2018 MLL Honors.

2019: New York Atlas; Brooks played in the first ever season of the PLL as a member of the Atlas Lacrosse Club before announcing his retirement on September 24, 2019.

=== USA Lacrosse ===
Brooks was named to the 2010 Men's USA Lacrosse National Training team. He broke his foot during the MLL Season which sidelined him for the final tryouts for the 2010 Men's USA Lacrosse Team. He continued to serve on the training team throughout his career, playing in the 2012, 2013, & 2014 Champion Challenge and earning an international cap during their match vs. Canada in the Duel in Denver.

== Coaching career ==
=== Professional ===
2020: New York Atlas; In January 2020, Brooks was named assistant coach of the New York Atlas in the professional lacrosse league PLL. He is the first ever PLL player turned coach in the league's history. On October 21, 2023, he was named the interim head coach with the resignation of Ben Rubeor.

February 2023: Brooks was named interim head coach of the New York Atlas for the 2023 Championship Series. Brooks led the Atlas to an outstanding showing, going undefeated in group play with a +27 goal differential, locking in the #1 seed. Ultimately, the New York Atlas fell short in the Finals to the Chrome LC (PLL) in a nail-biting ending, 23–24.

March 2023: The PLL named coach Mike Pressler as the new New York Atlas head coach. Coach Pressler elevated Brooks to offensive coordinator.

March 2024: The PLL named Steven Brooks as the Head Coach for 2024 Men's Professional Lacrosse Exhibition Game on March 20, 2024, at Fujitsu Stadium in Kawasaki, Kanagawa, Japan, featuring Premier Lacrosse League vs. SEKAI CROSSE. Brooks led the PLL All-Stars to an 8–5 victory over SEKAI CROSSE.

February 2025: Brooks was named acting head coach of the New York Atlas for the 2025 Championship Series, leading the team to a dominant 25–13 opening win over the Maryland Whipsnakes and a competitive group stage that included a close 20–23 loss to the Utah Archers. In the semifinals, the Atlas controlled much of the game but were edged out in overtime by the Boston Cannons, ending their run. Though they fell short of the title, Brooks's leadership and play-calling showcased his ability to maximize talent and establish the Atlas as one of the league's most dynamic teams.

September 2025: As offensive coordinator, Brooks guided the New York Atlas to their first Premier Lacrosse League championship with a 14–13 win over the Denver Outlaws. Despite losing attackman Xander Dickson to injury before half, the Atlas offense adapted under his system, with rookie Matt Traynor scoring key goals and Bryan Costabile delivering a decisive 97-mph shot to seal the victory.

January 2026: Brooks was named head coach of the Carolina Chaos, becoming the first former Premier Lacrosse League player to serve as a head coach in the league.

March 2026: Brooks led the Chaos to their first 2026 PLL Championship Series title. With the victory, Brooks became the first coach in league history to win both the PLL Championship and the PLL Championship Series back-to-back.

August 2026: In his first season as head coach of the Carolina Chaos in 2026, Brooks led the team to a 5–7 record, tying the franchise record for most regular-season wins in a season. In his first year at the helm, Brooks took the Chaos from the PLL's seventh-ranked offense in 2025 to the league's fourth-ranked offense in 2026, increasing the team's scoring output from 110 to 129 points. The turnaround came despite significant injuries to key contributors across every position group throughout the season, including midfielder Charlie Bertrand, attackman Eric Spanos, defensemen Jack Rowlett and Henry Bard, and faceoff specialist Justin Inacio.

=== USA Lacrosse ===
Brooks was named to the coaching staff for the USA Lacrosse U16 Men's National Training Development Program (NTDP) in 2019 joining John Galloway and Joel White. Brooks was named as head coach for the U18/U19 Men's USA Lacrosse NTDP team for the Brodgen Cup in 2021, 2022, 2023, 2024, 2025, 2026 winning the Brodgen Cup Trophy six consecutive years, defeating international competition.

=== Collegiate ===
Brooks joined the District of Columbia Firebirds coaching staff in 2014 and served as a volunteer assistant for one year.

=== High School ===
Brooks served as head coach of the Glenbrook South High School (Glenview, Illinois) Varsity Men's Lacrosse team from 2010 to 2012.

In 2014, Brooks was named offensive coordinator of St. Paul VI High School (Fairfax, VA) varsity lacrosse team. In 2018, he helped lead the team to win their first ever Virginia Independent Schools Athletic Association (VISAA) Division I Boys' Lacrosse State Championship.

=== Youth ===
Brooks has coached for multiple Youth Lacrosse Programs including; Lacrosse America, Team One, 3D Lacrosse, VEL, VLC, and many camps & clinics.

== Awards and achievements ==
=== Player ===
- 2002 High School All-American.
- 2002 Illinois Lacrosse Player of the Year
- 2004 NCAA Men's Lacrosse Championship Winner (Syracuse Orange).
- 2008 USILA First Team All-American
- 2008 won the McLaughlin Award as the nation's top midfielder.
- 2008 NCAA Men's Lacrosse Championship Winner (Syracuse Orange).
- 2008 Major League Lacrosse All-Star
- 2012 Major League Lacrosse All-Star
- 2012 Major League Lacrosse Steinfeld Cup Champion (Chesapeake Bayhawks)
- 2013 Major League Lacrosse All-Star
- 2013 Major League Lacrosse Steinfeld Cup Champion (Chesapeake Bayhawks)
- Named as one of Illinois's Greatest D1 College Lacrosse Players.
- Bridgton Academy Hall of Fame, Class of 2023.
- Illinois Sports Hall of Fame, Class of 2024.
- Libertyville High School Hall of Fame, Class of 2025.

=== Coach ===
- 2018 VISAA Division I Boys' Varsity Lacrosse State Championship - St. Paul VI High School (Offensive Coordinator)
- 2021, 2022, 2023, 2024, & 2025 U18 Men's USA Lacrosse Brogden Cup Champions - USA Lacrosse U18 Men's Team (Head Coach)
- 2025 Premier Lacrosse League Champions - New York Atlas (Offensive Coordinator)

== Statistics ==
=== NCAA ===
Season	Team	GP	G	A	Pts	GB	GW
2004	Syracuse University	16	3	2	5	23	0
2005	Syracuse University	13	17	12	29	18	0
2006	Syracuse University	1	0	0	0	0	0
2007	Syracuse University	12	19	7	26	20	1
2008	Syracuse University	18	28	13	41	25	5
Totals		60	67	34	101	86	6

=== Major League Lacrosse ===
		Regular Season													Playoffs
Season	Team	GP	G	2ptG	A	Pts	GB	PIM	PPG	PPA	GWG	S	SPCT	SOG	GP	G	2ptG	A	Pts	GB	PIM	PPG	PPA	GWG	S	SPCT	SOG
2008	Chicago	10	23	3	9	35	20	2.5	5	3	--	71	.324	45	--	--	--	--	--	--	--	--	--	--	--	--	--
2009	Chicago	5	6	1	2	9	6	--	2	--	1	20	.300	9	--	--	--	--	--	--	--	--	--	--	--	--	--
2010	Chicago	--	--	--	--	--	--	--	--	--	--	--	--	--	--	--	--	--	--	--	--	--	--	--	--	--	--
2011	Chesapeake	11	10	2	5	17	8	--	1	--	2	67	.149	32	1	1	--	--	1	--	--	--	--	--	5	.200	3
2012	Chesapeake	14	23	3	10	36	11	5.5	2	4	2	82	.280	43	2	2	--	4	6	1	--	--	--	--	17	.118	7
2013	Chesapeake	13	12	1	8	21	10	1.5	1	4	--	63	.190	34	1	1	--	1	1	2	--	--	--	--	3	.333	1
2014	Chesapeake	8	6	1	3	10	3	--	1	2	--	22	.273	12	--	--	--	--	--	--	--	--	--	--	--	--	--
2014	Florida	4	10	1	4	15	2	.5	1	1	--	35	.286	20	--	--	--	--	--	--	--	--	--	--	--	--	--
2015	Florida	13	24	1	5	30	18	.5	4	2	--	83	.289	50	--	--	--	--	--	--	--	--	--	--	--	--	--
2016	Florida	13	13	1	7	21	18	.5	1	1	--	53	.245	20	--	--	--	--	--	--	--	--	--	--	--	--	--
2017	Florida	14	12	1	4	17	6	1.5	0	0	--	53	.226	29	1	--	--	--	--	--	--	--	--	--	6	--	--
2018	Florida	14	8	0	3	11	10	2.5	0	1	--	48	.167	25	--	--	--	--	--	--	--	--	--	--	--	--	--
MLL Totals		119	147	15	60	222	112	15	18	18	5	597	--	319	5	4	--	5	8	3	--	--	--	--	31	--	11

=== Premier League Lacrosse ===
		Regular Season													Playoffs
Season	Team	GP	G	2ptG	A	Pts	GB	PIM	PPG	PPA	GWG	S	SPCT	SOG	GP	G	2ptG	A	Pts	GB	PIM	PPG	PPA	GWG	S	SPCT	SOG
2019	New York Atlas	2	--	--	--	--	--	--	--	--	--	--	--	--	--	--	--	--	--	--	--	--	--	--	--	--	--
PLL Totals		2	--	--	--	--	--	--	--	--	--	--	--	--	--	--	--	--	--	--	--	--	--	--	--	--	--
