= 2023 Premier Lacrosse League season =

Fifth season of the Premier Lacrosse League

- League: Premier Lacrosse League
- Sport: Field Lacrosse
- Defending champions: Philadelphia Waterdogs (2022)
- Duration: June 3 – September 24
- Teams: 8

Draft
- Top draft pick: Gavin Adler
- Picked by: New York Atlas

Regular season
- Season MVP: Tom Schreiber (Utah Archers)
- Top scorer: Marcus Holman (Boston Cannons)

Playoffs
- Finals champions: Utah Archers
- Runners-up: Philadelphia Waterdogs
- Finals MVP: Brett Dobson (Archers)

PLL seasons
- ← 2022 2024 →

The 2023 Premier Lacrosse League Season was the fifth season of the Premier Lacrosse League (PLL). It was held from June 3 through September 24.

This season marked the first time that the PLL held an event in the state of Kentucky with the All-Star Events being held in Louisville. This was also the first season a free agency period occurred.

This season the PLL unveiled new uniforms for each team. These uniforms were developed in partnership with Champion. The Waterdogs were given a third black jersey as part of being the reigning champions.

Archers Lacrosse Club would beat the reigning champion Waterdogs 15–14 in the PLL Championship game.

== Player movement ==
=== Preseason ===
==== Retirements ====
===== Notable retirements =====
The following notable players retired prior to the 2023 season:

- Ryan Brown (A) – Graduated from Johns Hopkins in 2016 where he scored 159 goals and had 50 assists. He was drafted by the Charlotte Hounds of MLL in 2016. Across his seven-year professional career, he scored 180 points (146 goals, 5 two-point goals, and 24 assists). He is a three-time all-star(2017, 2018, and 2019). Gold medalist in the 2018 World Lacrosse Men's Championship where he led the US national team with 25 goals and was named to the All-World team. 2022 PLL champion while playing for Waterdogs LC. He retired on February 15, 2023.
- Jake Froccaro (M) – Graduated from Villanova in 2017. While at Villanova he was named a two-time first-team All-BIG EAST member and was a 2017 USILA Second-team All-American. He began his professional career with the Chesapeake Bayhawks of the MLL he joined Chaos Lacrosse Club in 2019, and was traded to Cannons Lacrosse Club during the offseason after the 2021 Premier Lacrosse League season. He was a three-time all-star (2017, 2019, and 2021), 2019 Gait Brothers Midfielder of the Year Award nominee, and 2021 PLL Champion with Chaos Lacrosse Club. Over the course of his six-year career, he scored 88 points (31 goals, 10 two-point goals, and 36 assists) in 45 games. He retired from the PLL on March 13, 2023.
- Dominique Alexander (SSDM) – Graduated from Ohio State University in 2013. Throughout his 10-year professional lacrosse career, Alexander won the 2017 MLL Championship with the Ohio Machine, was the first recipient of the George Boiardi SSDM Hard Hat Award in 2019, an award given to the top SSDM that season, he was also an All-Pro that season and was an All-Star in 2021. He spent his entire career with the Ohio Machine (2013-2018) and Archers LC (2019-2022). In 123 career games, he recorded 49 caused turnovers, 176 ground balls, and 31 points. On March 16, 2023, he announced his retirement from the PLL.
- John Ranagan (M) – Graduated from Johns Hopkins in 2013, while at Hopkins he was a First Team All-American in 2011 and a Second Team All-American in 2012. Over his 10-year professional lacrosse career Ranagan played 99 games and scored 160 points. During his rookie season in the MLL in 2013 with the Rochester Rattlers, he was an MLL All-Star. He spent his entire career with the Rochester/Dallas Rattlers (2013-2018) of the MLL and then Chrome LC (2019-2022) of the PLL. With Chrome he was a team captain. He officially retired from the PLL on March 23, 2023 and released a statement on April 24, 2023.

===== Other retirements =====
- Ryan Hallenbeck (SSDM) – Graduated from Notre Dame in 2022, and went on to play in four games for the Redwoods during the 2022 season. He was placed on the player unable to participate (PUP) list on July 26 after participating in the Redwoods July 24 game against the Whipsnakes. He would not be reactivated for the remainder of the 2022 season and would retire from the PLL on February 15, 2023.
- Drew Simoneau (FO) – Graduated from Division III Nazareth College in 2015 where he was a three-time USILA All-American, and the 2015 Division III Faceoff Specialist of the Year. He started his professional career in 2016 with the Rochester Rattlers. He was a 2017 MLL all-star. He came to the PLL for its inaugural season in 2019 where he was a player for Chrome Lacrosse Club and appeared in 6 games and had a 44% faceoff win percentage. He was selected by the Waterdogs in the PLL expansion draft in 2020, he would go on to appear in 5 games for them. In 2021 he joined the expansion Cannons where he appeared in 3 games before being traded to the Whipsnakes. He was selected by the Redwoods via a reserve roster claim on August 16, 2021. He would not appear in any more games before retiring on March 9, 2023. He retired with a 54% career faceoff win percentage, scored 23 points (19 goals and 4 assists), and recorded 487 groundballs.
- John Crawley (M)
- Patrick Harbeson (DM)
- Jay Carlson (A)
- Jack Near (DM)

==== Free-Agency ====
The first ever PLL free agency period was open from March 6, 2023 to April 1, 2023. Players could sign one or two-year deals. Players to change teams included:

- Attackmen: Mac O'Keefe (Chaos to Archers, signed through 2024), Marcus Holman (Archers to Cannons, signed through 2023), Matt Kavanagh (Redwoods to Cannons, signed through 2023), Will Manny (Archers to Redwoods, signed through 2024), and Wes Berg (Chaos to Redwoods, signed through 2024).
- Defensemen Finn Sullivan (Redwoods to Cannons, signed through 2023), and Max Wayne (Atlas to Cannons, signed through 2023).
- Defensive Midfielder Jeff Trainor (Archers to Cannons, signed through 2023).
- Goalie Adam Ghitelman (Archers to Cannons, signed through 2023)
- Long Stick Midfielders Matt Rees (Chaos to Cannons, signed through 2023), and Kyle Hartzell (Redwoods to Cannons, signed through 2023).
- Midfielders Jake Carraway (Atlas to Waterdogs, signed through 2024), Ryan Tierney (Cannons to Redwoods, signed through 2023), Challen Rogers (Chaos to Archers, signed through 2024), and Justin Guterding (Whipsnakes to Atlas, signed through 2023).

Two players were signed out of the player-pool after participating with the same team during the 2023 Premier Lacrosse League Championship Series. Those players being: attackman Marc O'Rourke (Atlas, signed through 2023), and goalie Brendan Krebs (Whipsnakes, signed through 2024)

==== College Draft ====
The college draft took place on May 9 at 7 pm (ET) and was broadcast on ESPNU and ESPN+. Atlas LC acquired what became the number one overall pick from Cannons LC in a trade. Defenseman Gavin Adler became the first defenseman to be selected first overall in the PLL and the second-ever in professional field lacrosse, the first being Princeton's Ryan Mollett in 2001.

Format:

- Each team was awarded one pick in each of the four rounds.
- Eligible players must currently be in their senior year

Rnd.	Pick #	PLL Team	Player	Pos.	College	Conference	Notes
1	1	Atlas	Gavin Adler	Defense	Cornell	Ivy League	From Cannons
1	2	Redwoods	Owen Grant	Defense	Delaware	Coastal Athletic Association	
1	3	Atlas	Brett Makar	Defense	Maryland	Big Ten	
1	4	Chrome	Sam Handley	Midfield	Penn	Ivy League	
1	5	Archers	Mike Sisselberger	Faceoff	Lehigh	Patriot League	
1	6	Whipsnakes	Tucker Dordevic	Attack	Georgetown	Big East	
1	7	Chaos	Will Bowen	Defense	Georgetown	Big East	
1	8	Waterdogs	Thomas McConvey	Midfield	Virginia	Atlantic Coast Conference	
2	9	Cannons	Matt Campbell	Midfield	Villanova	Big East	
2	10	Redwoods	Brian Telvin	Midfield	Notre Dame	Atlantic Coast Conference	
2	11	Atlas	Xander Dickson	Attack	Virginia	Atlantic Coast Conference	
2	12	Chrome	Troy Hettinger	LSM	Jacksonville	ASUN Conference	
2	13	Archers	Connor Maher	DM	UNC	Atlantic Coast Conference	
2	14	Whipsnakes	Petey LaSalla	Faceoff	Virginia	Atlantic Coast Conference	
2	15	Chaos	Brian Minicus	Attack	Georgetown	Big East	
2	16	Waterdogs	Alex Mazzone	Defense	Johns Hopkins	Big Ten	
3	17	Chaos	Tye Kirtz	Attack	Delaware	Coastal Athletic Association	From Cannons
3	18	Redwoods	Cole Kirst	Midfield	Syracuse	Atlantic Coast Conference	
3	19	Atlas	Payton Rezanka	DM	Loyola	Patriot League	
3	20	Chrome	Jack Myers	Attack	Ohio State	Big Ten	
3	21	Archers	Piper Bond	DM	Penn	Ivy League	
3	22	Whipsnakes	Garrett Leadmon	Midfield	Duke	Atlantic Coast Conference	
3	23	Chaos	Nick Rowlett	Faceoff	Michigan	Big Ten	
3	24	Waterdogs	Chris Fake	Defense	Notre Dame	Atlantic Coast Conference	
4	25	Cannons	Grant Ammann	Defense	High Point	Atlantic 10	
4	26	Redoods	Zach Cole	Faceoff	Saint Joseph's	Atlantic 10	
4	27	Atlas	Kyle Long	Midfield	Maryland	Big Ten	
4	28	Chrome	Cross Ferrara	Attack	Salisbury	Coast-to-Coast Athletic Conference	
4	29	Archers	Cam Wyers	Defense	Loyola	Patriot League	
4	30	Whipsnakes	Elijah Gash	LSM	Albany	America East Conference	
4	31	Chaos	Levi Anderson	Attack	Saint Joseph's	Atlantic 10	
4	32	Waterdogs	James Reilly	Faceoff	Georgetown	Big East	

===== Trades =====
In the explanations below, (PD) indicates trades completed prior to the start of the draft (i.e. Pre-Draft), while (D) denotes trades that took place during the 2023 draft.

====== First Round ======
1. No. 1: Cannons → Atlas (PD). The Cannons traded their 2023 first round pick during the 2022 PLL Draft for picks used to select Bubba Fairman and Colin Kirst.

====== Third Round ======
1. No. 17: Cannons → Chaos (PD). The Cannons traded their 2023 third round pick and Andrew Kew for Jake Froccaro.

===== Summary =====
====== Selections by NCAA conference ======
Conference	Round 1	Round 2	Round 3	Round 4	Total
America East	0	0	0	1	1
ACC	1	4	3	0	8
Atlantic 10	0	0	0	3	3
ASUN Conference	0	1	0	0	1
Big East	2	2	0	1	5
Big Ten	1	1	2	1	5
C2C	0	0	0	1	1
Coastal Athletic Association	1	0	1	0	2
Ivy League	2	0	1	1	4
Patriot League	1	0	1	1	3

====== Schools by number of draft selections ======
Selections	Schools
4	Georgetown
3	Virginia
2	Delaware, Loyola, Maryland, Notre Dame, Saint Joseph's, Penn
1	Albany, Cornell, Duke, High Point, Jacksonville, Johns Hopkins, Lehigh, Michigan, UNC, Ohio State, Salisbury, Syracuse, Villanova

====== Selections by Position ======
Position	Round 1	Round 2	Round 3	Round 4	Total
Attack	1	2	2	2	7
Defense	4	1	1	2	8
Defensive Midfield	0	1	2	0	3
Faceoff	1	1	1	2	5
Goalie	0	0	0	0	0
LSM	0	1	0	1	2
Midfield	2	2	2	1	7

==== Lyle Thompson sabbatical ====
On May 15, the day 30-man training camp rosters were due, it was announced that Lyle Thompson would be taking a one-year sabbatical from play to focus on himself, his family, and his community. Thompson was placed on the league's hold-out list for the 2023 season. He is under contract with Cannons LC through the 2024 season and returned to play for them in 2024. Lyle Thompson won two Tewaaraton Awards while at the University of Albany. He also scored 400 points, the most in NCAA D1 History.

=== Notable mid-season player movement ===
==== Free-agency ====
The following acquisitions were made from free-agency during the 2023 season:

- On August 8, Atlas LC acquired attackman Dylan Molloy from free-agency after he was released by Chrome LC. He was signed through 2023.

==== Trades ====
The 2023 season trade deadline was on August 22, at 2 PM EST which was the Tuesday before the final regular season game.

The following trades were made during the 2023 season:

- On August 7, Redwoods LC traded midfielder Myles Jones to Atlas LC in exchange for midfielder Romar Dennis.
- On August 22, Chrome LC traded their leading scorer, attackman and midfielder Jackson Morrill and their third-round pick in the 2024 college draft to Whipsnakes LC in exchange for Whipsnakes' second and third-round picks in the 2024 college draft.

=== Retirements after season ===
The following players retired after the 2023 season:

- Brodie Merrill (LSM) - Widely considered the greatest long-stick midfielder of all time, announced he was retiring from professional lacrosse on September 13, 2023. He graduated from Georgetown in 2005 where he won the Schmeisser Award, an award given to the top defenseman in NCAA lacrosse, during the 2005 season. He retires as the all-time leader in professional field lacrosse games played (200), and is tied with face-off specialist Greg Gurenlian for the most ground balls won (1,120). He is the namesake for the Brodie Merrill Long Stick Midfielder of the Year award, which is the only award to be named after a player that was active when the award was named. He is the highest scoring longpole in field lacrosse history scoring 146 points (51 goals, 4 two-point goals, 87 assists). He is a 10-time all-star, won the rookie of the year award in the MLL in 2005, and won six straight defensive player of the year awards in the MLL (2006-2011). He won three MLL championships (2005, 2008, 2009). He played for five Canadian National Teams where he won gold in 2006 and 2024, and won silver in 2010, 2018, and 2023. Over the course of his 18-year field lacrosse career he played for four MLL teams: the Baltimore Bayhawks (2005), the Rochester Rattlers (2006-2008), the Toronto/Hamilton Nationals (2009-2013) and the Boston Cannons (2014-2018). He also played for three PLL teams: Chaos LC (2019), Waterdogs LC (2020), and Cannons LC (2021-2023). Merrill did not play during the 2023 PLL season and was placed on the holdout list by the Cannons before the season started.
- Kyle Hartzell (LSM & D) - On September 18, 2023 Hartzell announced his retirement from professional lacrosse in an Instagram post. He finishes his lacrosse career as a two-time MLL champion, the first, and as of 2023 only defenseman to win the championship MVP award when he did so in 2010, a one-time all-pro, a seven-time all-star, a team USA silver medalist in 2014 and a gold medalist in 2018. He was also the fastest shot champion twice and at one point held the world record for fastest shot at 111 MPH. He holds the record for most points in a season scored by a defenseman at 21, and also holds the record for the most two-point goals in a season with 9.
- Jordan MacIntosh (M) - On October 17, 2023 MacIntosh announced his retirement from the PLL in an Instagram post. He retires as a two-time all-star and 2022 recipient of the PLL Leadership award. He was also Chrome's captain.

== Rule Changes ==
This season also included three rule changes:

- The shot clock was reduced from 52 seconds to 32 seconds following possession gained from faceoffs and offensive rebounds which trigger a shot clock restart. The 52-second shot clock remained for other possession changes such as a defensive stop. This rule change was met with criticism throughout the league by individuals such as Atlas coach Mike Pressler. Proponents of the rule argue it is designed to encourage face-off specialists to be more well-rounded players. The rule change has also driven teams such as the Waterdogs, Cannons, and Chrome to not dress a faceoff specialist.
- The two-point arc was reduced from 15 yards to 13 yards on either side of the goal line extended. The 15-yard distance remained for the top center, top left, and top right locations. This change is similar to the three-point line in basketball which also has closer corners.
- The number of full 60-second timeouts for each team per game was reduced from three to two. Each team now has one 30-second timeout as well.

== 2023 deaths ==
=== Jim Brown ===
On May 19, National Lacrosse Hall of Famer and namesake for the PLL's MVP award, Jim Brown died. Brown was most well known for his NFL career (where he achieved a Hall of Fame career as well) but is considered to be one of the best lacrosse players of all time. During his time at Syracuse University, Brown was an All-American in both football and lacrosse. In 2011, Brown became the first recipient of the Tewaaraton Legacy Award, an award given to outstanding players that played collegiate lacrosse prior to the introduction of the Tewaaraton Award in 2001. In 2012, Brown was part of an ownership group that purchased the New York Lizards of the MLL.

== Training camp ==
The Premier Lacrosse League's 2023 training camp was held from May 26, 2023 to May 30, 2023 in Albany, New York hosted at Tom and Mary Casey Stadium at The University of Albany. Teams began camp with a 30-man roster that was finalized on May 15. Teams were required to finalize their 25-man rosters on May 30. Training camp consists of individual and multi-team practices, as well as scrimmages between the teams.

== Tour map ==
Tour locations for the 2023 PLL season
Legend:
: Regular Season Tour Location
: All-Star Game Location
: Quarterfinals Location
: Semifinals Location
: Finals Location

== Tour venues ==
Week	Venue	Location	Capacity (Note: Capacity may not reflect the capacity for the PLL's purposes due to various areas of the stadium potentially being closed for lacrosse games)	Image	Notes	Ref
1	Tom & Mary Casey Stadium	Albany, NY	8,500			
2	American Legion Memorial Stadium	Charlotte, NC	10,500	Photo of an empty American Legion Memorial Stadium from the top row of a corner section		
3	OSU Lacrosse Stadium	Columbus, OH	3,000		This was the first year the PLL held an event at this venue	
4	TCO Stadium	Eagan, MN	6,000			
5	Rafferty Stadium	Fairfield, CT	3,500	An aerial photo of an empty Rafferty Stadium		
6 (All-Star Game)	Dr. Mark & Cindy Lynn Stadium	Louisville, KY				
7	Ford Center at The Star	Frisco, TX	12,000	Photo of the inside of an empty Ford Center at the Star, an indoors stadium from one of the upper corner sections		
8	Homewood Field	Baltimore, MD	8,500	Photo of an empty Homewood Field set up for lacrosse, taken from the top row of one of the end sections		
9	Barton Stadium	Denver, CO	2,000			
10	Cheney Stadium	Tacoma, WA	6,500	Photo of Cheney Stadium during a baseball game, taken from the stands looking towards home from right field	This was the first year the PLL held an event at this venue	
11	Zions Bank Stadium	Herriman, UT	5,000	Photo of the exterior of Zions Bank Stadium		
12 (Quarterfinals)	Gillette Stadium	Foxborough, MA	65,878	An aerial photo of an empty Gillette Stadium in 2007		
13 (Semifinals)	Shuart Stadium	Uniondale, NY	11,929			
14 (Championship)	Subaru Park	Chester, PA	18,500	Photo of Subaru Park from the river end of the stadium during an MLS game		

== Schedule ==
Week	Date	Games	Time (EDT)	Broadcast (Note: All games broadcast on ESPN+ alongside the network listed.)	Venue	City	Notes	Ref
1	June 3	Redwoods 13–12 Atlas	1 PM	ABC	Tom & Mary Casey Stadium	Albany, NY		
1	June 3	Cannons 13–16 Archers	3:30 PM	ESPN+	Tom & Mary Casey Stadium	Albany, NY		
1	June 4	Chaos 7–8 (OT) Waterdogs	1 PM	ABC	Tom & Mary Casey Stadium	Albany, NY		
1	June 4	Whipsnakes 11–12 Chrome	3:30 PM	ESPN+	Tom & Mary Casey Stadium	Albany, NY		
2	June 9	Chrome 7–12 Archers	6 PM	ESPN+	American Legion Memorial Stadium	Charlotte, NC		
2	June 9	Waterdogs 9–10 Redwoods	8:30 PM	ESPN+	American Legion Memorial Stadium	Charlotte, NC		
2	June 10	Whipsnakes 11–12 Atlas	3 PM	ABC	American Legion Memorial Stadium	Charlotte, NC		
2	June 10	Chaos 14–13 Cannons	5:30 PM	ESPN+	American Legion Memorial Stadium	Charlotte, NC		
3	June 16	Waterdogs 19–18; Atlas	6 PM	ESPN+	OSU Lacrosse Stadium	Columbus, OH		
3	June 16	Chrome 13–14 Cannons	8:30 PM	ESPN+	OSU Lacrosse Stadium	Columbus, OH		
3	June 17	Archers 10–15 Chaos	12 PM	ESPN	OSU Lacrosse Stadium	Columbus, OH		
3	June 17	Redwoods 11–18 Whipsnakes	7 PM	ESPN+	OSU Lacrosse Stadium	Columbus, OH		
4	July 8	Waterdogs; 10–7 Chrome	6 PM	ESPN+	TCO Stadium	Eagan, MN (Minneapolis)	The PLL celebrated Indigenous Heritage Weekend. Teams wore special uniforms that were designed by Patrick Hunter—an Ojibwe artist.	
4	July 8	Cannons; 19–12 Atlas	8:30 PM	ESPN+	TCO Stadium	Eagan, MN (Minneapolis)	The PLL celebrated Indigenous Heritage Weekend. Teams wore special uniforms that were designed by Patrick Hunter—an Ojibwe artist.	
4	July 9	Redwoods; 13–8 Chaos	2 PM	ESPN2	TCO Stadium	Eagan, MN (Minneapolis)	The PLL celebrated Indigenous Heritage Weekend. Teams wore special uniforms that were designed by Patrick Hunter—an Ojibwe artist.	
4	July 9	Whipsnakes; 12–15 Archers	4:30 PM	ESPN+	TCO Stadium	Eagan, MN (Minneapolis)	The PLL celebrated Indigenous Heritage Weekend. Teams wore special uniforms that were designed by Patrick Hunter—an Ojibwe artist.	
5	July 14	Waterdogs; 16–13 Whipsnakes	6 PM	ESPN+	Rafferty Stadium	Fairfield, CT		
5	July 14	Archers; 10–3 Redwoods	8:30 PM	ESPN+	Rafferty Stadium	Fairfield, CT		
5	July 15	Chrome; 6 –12 Cannons	6 PM	ESPN2	Rafferty Stadium	Fairfield, CT		
5	July 15	Atlas; 11–15 Chaos	8:30 PM	ESPN+	Rafferty Stadium	Fairfield, CT		
6 (PLL All-Star Game)	July 22	Skills Challenge	6:00 PM	ESPN	Dr. Mark & Cindy Lynn Stadium	Louisville, KY		
6 (PLL All-Star Game)	July 22	Rising Stars; 19–26; Veterans	7:30 PM	ESPN	Dr. Mark & Cindy Lynn Stadium	Louisville, KY		
7	July 29	Atlas; 11–9 Chrome	6 PM	ESPN+	The Star	Frisco, TX (Dallas)		
7	July 29	Cannons; 16–10 Redwoods	8:30 PM	ESPN+	The Star	Frisco, TX (Dallas)		
7	July 30	Waterdogs; 18–19 Archers	3 PM	ABC	The Star	Frisco, TX (Dallas)		
7	July 30	Whipsnakes; 17–16 Chaos	5:30 PM	ESPN+	The Star	Frisco, TX (Dallas)		
8	August 5	Archers; 14 (OT)–13 Atlas	3 PM	ABC	Homewood Field	Baltimore, MD	PLL Alumni Weekend, the PLL inducted the 2023 Class of the Professional Lacrosse Hall of Fame. Highest attended two-day event in PLL history, sold out on August 5.	
8	August 5	Whipsnakes; 12–5 Chrome	5:30 PM	ESPN+	Homewood Field	Baltimore, MD	PLL Alumni Weekend, the PLL inducted the 2023 Class of the Professional Lacrosse Hall of Fame. Highest attended two-day event in PLL history, sold out on August 5.	
8	August 6	Redwoods; 12–14 Chaos	1 PM	ABC	Homewood Field	Baltimore, MD	PLL Alumni Weekend, the PLL inducted the 2023 Class of the Professional Lacrosse Hall of Fame. Highest attended two-day event in PLL history, sold out on August 5.	
8	August 6	Waterdogs; 8–12 Cannons	3:30 PM	ESPN+	Homewood Field	Baltimore, MD	PLL Alumni Weekend, the PLL inducted the 2023 Class of the Professional Lacrosse Hall of Fame. Highest attended two-day event in PLL history, sold out on August 5.	
9	August 11	Chaos; 10–12 Whipsnakes	8 PM	ESPN+	Barton Stadium	Denver, CO	PLL throwback weekend	
9	August 11	Chrome; 5 –13 Archers	10:30 PM	ESPN+	Barton Stadium	Denver, CO	PLL throwback weekend	
9	August 12	Atlas; 11–14 Waterdogs	7 PM	ESPN2	Barton Stadium	Denver, CO	PLL throwback weekend	
9	August 12	Cannons; 15–16 (OT) Redwoods	9:30 PM	ESPN+	Barton Stadium	Denver, CO	PLL throwback weekend	
10	August 18	Archers; 16–11 Whipsnakes	9 PM	ESPN2	Cheney Stadium	Tacoma, WA (Seattle)		
10	August 18	Atlas; 13–14 Cannons	11:30 PM	ESPN+	Cheney Stadium	Tacoma, WA (Seattle)		
10	August 19	Chrome; 10–11 (OT) Redwoods	8 PM	ESPN+	Cheney Stadium	Tacoma, WA (Seattle)		
10	August 19	Chaos; 8–13 Waterdogs	10:30	ESPN+	Cheney Stadium	Tacoma, WA (Seattle)		
11	August 25	Archers; 13–14 Waterdogs	8 PM	ESPN+	Zions Bank Stadium	Herriman, UT (Salt Lake City)		
11	August 25	Atlas; 7–12 Redwoods	10:30 PM	ESPN2	Zions Bank Stadium	Herriman, UT (Salt Lake City)		
11	August 26	Cannons 15–11; Whipsnakes	7 PM	ESPN+	Zions Bank Stadium	Herriman, UT (Salt Lake City)		
11	August 26	Chaos; 13–7 Chrome	9:30 PM	ESPN+	Zions Bank Stadium	Herriman, UT (Salt Lake City)		
12; Playoffs (Quarterfinals)	September 4	#4 Redwoods; 15–9 #5 Chaos	11:45 AM	ESPN+	Gillette Stadium	Foxborough, MA (Boston)		
12; Playoffs (Quarterfinals)	September 4	#3 Waterdogs; 15–12 #6 Whipsnakes	2:20 PM	ESPN+	Gillette Stadium	Foxborough, MA (Boston)		
12; Playoffs (Quarterfinals)	September 4	#2 Cannons; 20–11 #7 Atlas	5 PM	ESPN2	Gillette Stadium	Foxborough, MA (Boston)		
13; Playoffs (Semifinals)	September 10	#1 Archers; 14–6 #4 Redwoods	3 PM	ABC	Shuart Stadium	Uniondale, NY (Long Island)		
13; Playoffs (Semifinals)	September 10	#2 Cannons; 6–17 #3 Waterdogs	5:30 PM	ESPN+	Shuart Stadium	Uniondale, NY (Long Island)		
14; PLL Championship	September 24	#1 Archers; 15–14 #3 Waterdogs	3 PM	ABC	Subaru Park	Chester, PA (Philadelphia)		

Notes

The PLL included a two-week international break following week 3 in Columbus so that players could compete in 2023 World Lacrosse Championship.

== PLL on TV ==
The 2023 PLL season was the PLL's second season on ESPN platforms. All 48 games were broadcast on ESPN+, ESPN's streaming service, and 16 games were on ESPN's linear platforms, a four-game increase over the 2022 season. Eight of the games were broadcast on ABC, a five-game increase over the 2022 season, two games were broadcast on ESPN, a one-game decrease from the 2022 season, and six games were broadcast on ESPN2, the same as the 2022 season.

=== List of linear broadcast games ===
The following games were broadcast on ESPN's linear platforms:

Week	Date	Location	Teams	Platform	Time (EDT)	Peak Viewership	Average Viewership	Notes	Ref.
1	June 3	Albany, NY	Redwoods LC v.s. Atlas LC	ABC	1:00 PM	782,000	543,000	Opening game, set record for most watched professional outdoor lacrosse game	
1	June 4	Albany, NY	Chaos LC v.s. Waterdogs LC	ABC	1:00 PM				
2	June 10	Charlotte, NC	Whipsnakes LC v.s. Atlas LC	ABC	3:00 PM				
3	June 17	Columbus, OH	Archers LC v.s. Chaos LC	ESPN	12:00 PM				
4	July 9	Minneapolis, MN	Redwoods LC v.s. Chaos LC	ESPN2	2:00 PM				
5	July 15	Fairfield, CT	Chrome LC v.s. Cannons LC	ESPN2	6:00 PM				
6	July 22	Louisville, KY	Veterans v.s. Rising-Stars	ESPN	8:00 PM			All-star game	
7	July 30	Dallas, TX	Waterdogs LC v.s. Archers LC	ABC	3:00 PM				
8	August 5	Baltimore, MD	Archers LC v.s. Atlas LC	ABC	3:00 PM				
8	August 6	Baltimore, MD	Redwoods LC v.s. Chaos LC	ABC	1:00 PM				
9	August 12	Denver, CO	Atlas LC v.s. Waterdogs LC	ESPN2	7:00 PM				
10	August 18	Seattle, WA	Archers LC v.s. Whipsnakes LC	ESPN2	9:00 PM				
11	August 25	Salt Lake City, UT	Atlas LC v.s. Redwoods LC	ESPN2	10:30 PM				
12 (Quarterfinals)	September 4	Boston, MA	Quarterfinal 3 - Cannons LC v.s. Atlas LC	ESPN2	5:00 PM				
13 (Semifinals)	September 10	Long Island, NY	Semifinal 1 - Archers LC v.s. Redwoods LC	ABC	3:00 PM				
14 (PLL Championship Game)	September 24	Philadelphia, PA	Archers LC v.s. Waterdogs LC	ABC	3:00 PM			15% higher viewership compared to the 2022 championship game	

=== Multi-game viewership statistics ===
Through the first two weeks of the season the PLL reported a 50% increase in ESPN+ viewership, and a 131% in views.

On August 15, with two weeks remaining in the regular season (and 5 linear broadcast games remaining) it was announced that the PLL had seen a 69% boost in total viewership over the 2022 season. The PLL also saw a 25% increase in average viewership of games broadcast on ABC, ESPN, and ESPN2 over the 2022 season. With 5 linear broadcast games remaining and the all-star games excluded from both seasons, the 2023 season was averaging 254,000 per game while the 2022 season was average 150,000 at the same point.

Following the conclusion of the season the PLL announced that the 2023 season was the most watched in league history. Average viewership on ABC, ESPN, and ESPN2 was up 36% and average viewership on ESPN+ was up 60% compared to the 2022 season.

Time Period	Average Vewership	Notes	Ref.
Week one viewership	449,000	All games had been on ABC	
Through week two	409,000	All games had been on ABC	
Through week nine	245,000		

=== Linear broadcast games by team ===
The following table shows the number of games each team participated in that were broadcast on linear TV. The number in parentheses shows the number of games excluding that team's postseason games.

Team	Total number of games	ABC	ESPN	ESPN2
Archers LC	6 (4)	4 (2)	1	1
Atlas LC	6 (5)	3	0	3 (2)
Cannons LC	2 (1)	0	0	2 (1)
Chaos LC	4	2	1	1
Chrome LC	1	0	0	1
Redwoods LC	5 (4)	3 (2)	0	2
Waterdogs LC	4 (2)	3 (2)	0	1
Whipsnakes LC	2	1	0	1

The Archers and Atlas tied for the most games broadcast on linear platforms with six. The Atlas had the most regular-season games broadcast with 5, they also had the most regular season games broadcast on ABC. The Archers would take the most games broadcast on ABC overall with four, two of which were during the post season.

The Atlas would also have the most games broadcast on ESPN2 with three, and tied the Redwoods for most regular season games broadcast on ESPN2 with two.

The Chrome had the least linear broadcast games overall and were tied with Cannons LC for least number of regular season games. The two teams only linear broadcast regular season game was their week 5 game against each other on ESPN2 that the Cannons would win 12 to 6.

=== Commentating team ===
On June 1, ESPN announced the commentators for the 2023 PLL season:

Play-by-play duties would be handled by Anish Shroff, Chris Cotter, Jay Alter, Drew Carter, and Jake Marsh, all of whom have broadcast lacrosse before.

Game analysts include broadcasting veterans Quint Kessenich, Paul Carcaterra, and Ryan Boyle, alongside newcomers Kyle Harrison, nine-time MLL/PLL all-star, and Bill Tierney, the legendary former head coach of the Denver University men's lacrosse team.

Reporters include Katie George, Dana Boyle, and Chantel McCabe, alongside newcomers Charlotte North, and Caley Chelios.

== Regular season standings ==
2023 Premier Lacrosse League Standings
Team	W	L	T	SF	SA	Diff
Archers	8	2	0	138	111	27
Cannons	7	3	0	143	119	24
Waterdogs	7	3	0	129	118	11
Redwoods	6	4	0	111	119	-8
Chaos	5	5	0	120	116	4
Whipsnakes	4	6	0	128	128	0
Atlas	2	8	0	120	140	-20
Chrome	1	9	0	81	119	-38

Top 7 Teams Qualify for 2023 Playoffs
8th Place Misses 2023 Playoffs
Top 4 Teams Qualify for 2024 Championship Series

== Postseason ==
The PLL Postseason features the top 7 teams in the standings at the end of the regular season; competing in a single elimination tournament. The top seed receives a first-round bye. The remaining teams are matched up as follows: the second seed plays the seventh seed, the third seed plays the sixth seed, and the fourth seed plays the fifth seed. The top seed plays the winner of the game between the fourth seed and the fifth seed and the remaining two teams are matched against each other in the semi-final. The winners of the semi-final games compete in the finals at Chester, PA (Philadelphia). The postseason began on September 4, 2023, in Foxborough, MA (Boston) and concluded on September 24, 2023.

=== Bracket ===
Quarterfinals; September 4 (Boston)
#4	Redwoods	15
#5	Chaos	9
#3	Waterdogs	15
#6	Whipsnakes	12
#2	Cannons	20
#7	Atlas	11

Semifinals; September 10 (Long Island)
#1	Archers	14
#4	Redwoods	6
#3	Waterdogs	17
#2	Cannons	6

PLL Championship Game; September 24 (Philadelphia)
#1	Archers	15
#3	Waterdogs	14

=== Boxscores and game summaries ===
==== Quarterfinals ====
Game 1 - 11:45 AM #4 Redwoods v.s. #5 Chaos
Team	1	2	3	4	Final
#4 Redwoods	5	8	1	1	15
#5 Chaos	2	1	3	3	9

Game 2 - 2:20 PM #3 Waterdogs v.s. #6 Whipsnakes
Team	1	2	3	4	Final
#3 Waterdogs	5	5	3	2	15
#6 Whipsnakes	5	4	1	2	12

Game 3 - 5:00 PM #2 Cannons v.s. #7 Atlas
Team	1	2	3	4	Final
#2 Cannons	5	7	4	4	20
#7 Atlas	3	5	1	2	11

==== Semifinals ====
Game 1 - 3:00 PM #1 Archers v.s. #4 Redwoods
Team	1	2	3	4	Final
#1 Archers	4	3	4	3	14
#4 Redwoods	0	3	0	3	6

Game 2 - 5:30 PM #2 Cannons v.s. #3 Waterdogs
Team	1	2	3	4	Final
#2 Cannons	1	2	1	2	6
#3 Waterdogs	3	6	7	1	17

==== PLL Championship Game ====
===== Boxscore =====
Team	1	2	3	4	Final
#3 Waterdogs	2	5	4	3	14
#1 Archers	5	5	2	3	15

===== Championship game Most Valuable Player =====
Archers goalie Brett Dobson was awarded the Championship game MVP award after finishing the game with 18 saves (58% save percentage). Dobson's final save of the game came off of a last-second two-point attempt by Waterdogs midfielder Jack Carraway. Had the shot gone in the Waterdogs would have been up 16–15 with less than a second remaining in the game.

===== Broadcast =====
The PLL championship game was broadcast on ABC with Paul Carcaterra, Ryan Boyle, and Chris Cotter in the booth, and Quint Kessenich reporting on the field.

===== Injuries =====
====== Pre-game injuries ======
The Archers were without SSDM of the Year, Latrell Harris as he tore his ACL during the Archers semifinal win over the Redwoods. Despite being listed on the active roster, the Archers were without leading scorer Connor Fields who separated his shoulder in the Archers semifinal win.

====== Mid-game injuries ======
During the second quarter it was announced that Archers LSM Cam Wyers would be out for the remainder of the game.

During the fourth quarter following the Archers goal with 6:05 left in the fourth quarter, Waterdogs goalie Dillon Ward was helped off the field and Waterdogs back-up goalie Matt DeLuca entered the game.

===== Scoring Summary =====
====== First quarter ======
- 7:40 - Waterdogs Ryan Conrad goal, 1-0 Waterdogs
- 5:52 - Archers Mac O'Keefe goal, assisted by Matt Moore, 1–1
- 3:31 - Waterdogs Michael Sowers goal, 2-1 Waterdogs
- 2:05 - Archers Ryan Aughavin two-point goal, assisted by Mac O'Keefe, 2-3 Archers
- 1:15 - Archers Grant Ament goal, assisted by Tre Leclaire, 2-4 Archers
- 0:04 - Archers Tre Leclaire goal, 2-5 Archers

At the end of the first quarter, Waterdogs goalie Dillon Ward had 3 saves, and Archers goalie Brett Dobson had 8 saves

====== Second quarter ======
- 11:04 - Archers Grant Ament goal, 2-6 Archers
- 10:43 - Archers Matt Moore goal, assisted by Challen Rogers, 2-7 Archers
- 9:18 - Archers Tom Schreiber goal, 2-8 Archers
- 8:46 - Waterdogs Ryan Conrad goal, 3-8 Archers
- 8:02 - Archers Mac O'Keefe goal, assisted by Ryan Aughavin, 3-9 Archers
- 7:06 - Waterdogs Jake Carraway goal, assisted by Michael Sowers. 4-9 Archers
- 4:44 - Archers Reid Bowering goal, assisted by Matt Moore, 4-10 Archers
- 4:35 - Waterdogs Zach Currier goal, 5-10 Archers
- 2:37 - Waterdogs Connor Kelly goal, assisted by Kieran McArdle, 6-10 Archers
- 0:07 - Waterdogs Michael Sowers power play goal, assisted by Kieran McArdle, 7-10 Archers

At the end of the half, Waterdogs goalie Dillon Ward had zero saves in the second quarter (three total saves), and Archers goalie Brett Dobson had fives saves in the second quarter (13 total saves).

====== Third quarter ======
- 9:43 - Archers Tre Leclaire goal, 7-11 Archers
- 9:03 - Waterdogs Connor Kelly goal, 8-11 Archers
- 8:57 - Archers Mike Sisselberger goal, 8-12 Archers
- 5:12 - Waterdogs Ethan Walker goal, assisted by Jack Hannah, 9-12 Archers
- 4:19 - Waterdogs Jake Carraway two-point goal, assisted by Jack Hannah, 11-12 Archers

At the end of the third quarter, Waterdogs goalie Dillon Ward had one save in the third quarter (4 total saves), and Archers goalie Brett Dobson had two saves in the third quarter (15 total saves).

====== Fourth quarter ======
- 9:14 - Waterdogs Zach Currier goal, 12-12 tied for the first time since it was 1–1
- 7:55 - Archers Mac O'Keefe goal, assisted by Grant Ament, 12-13 Archers
- 6:05 - Archers Tre Leclaire short-handed goal, assisted by Matt Moore 12-14 Archers
- 5:35 - Waterdogs Ryan Conrad power play goal, assisted by Michael Sowers, 13-14 Archers
- 4:33 - Waterdogs Jack Carraway power play goal, assisted by Connor Kelly, 14–14
- 1:37 - Archers Tom Schreiber goal, 14-15 Archers

When Dillon Ward exited the game with 6:05 remaining, he had three saves in the fourth quarter (7 total saves). Waterdogs back up goalie Matt DeLuca made 3 saves and allowed one goal after he entered the game with 6:05 left. Archers goalie Brett Dobson had three saves in the fourth quarter (18 total saves).

=== Postseason clinching timeline ===
==== Week 8 - Baltimore ====
- Archers Lacrosse Club became the first team to clinch a spot in the playoffs when they defeated Atlas Lacrosse Club by a score of 14 to 13 in overtime.
- Cannons Lacrosse Club became the second team to clinch a spot in the playoffs when they defeated Waterdogs Lacrosse Club by a score of 12 to 8.

==== Week 9 - Denver ====
- Whipsnakes Lacrosse Club became the third team to clinch a spot in the playoffs after they defeated Chaos Lacrosse Club by a score of 12 to 10.
- Chaos Lacrosse Club (who had lost to Whipsnakes LC earlier in the day) and Waterdogs Lacrosse Club (who would not play until the day after) both clinched the playoffs after Archers LC defeated Chrome LC 13 to 5. Once Chrome hit 7 losses, it became impossible for them to reach 4 wins and so it would be impossible for them to pass either Chaos or Waterdogs in the standings.
- Redwoods Lacrosse Club became the sixth team to clinch the playoffs after they defeated Cannons Lacrosse Club by a score of 16 to 15 in overtime.

==== Week 10 - Seattle ====
- Archers Lacrosse Club clinched the number one seed after defeating Whipsnakes Lacrosse Club by a score of 16 to 11.

==== Week 11 - Salt Lake City ====
- Atlas Lacrosse Club clinched the final playoff spot during the last week of the regular season when Chaos Lacrosse Club defeated Chrome Lacrosse Club by a score of 13 to 7. This also eliminated Chrome from the playoffs. Coming into the final week of the regular season the Atlas and the Chrome were seventh and eighth on the standings respectively with only the eighth place team missing the playoffs. The Atlas had 2 wins and 7 losses with a -15 goal differential, the Chrome had 1 win and 8 losses with a -32 goal differential. In order to make the playoffs, the Atlas needed to win or they could lose so long as the Chrome did not win while surpassing them in goal differential (being tied in goal differential would have given the playoff position to the Atlas since they defeated the Chrome twice in the regular season). Both teams would go on to lose their final regular season games and Atlas made the playoffs.

== Records, milestones, and notable statistics ==
Week 3 - Columbus

- The Atlas' Trevor Baptiste had a PLL-record 31 face-off wins(86% win percentage) in a single game in a loss to the Waterdogs.
- The Waterdogs' Connor Kelly scored three two-point goals, becoming the 12th ever professional lacrosse player to do so in one game.
- The 37 combined goals in the Waterdogs 19–18 win against the Atlas are the most ever in a single game in PLL history. Surpassing the previous record of 36 set in Week 9 of the 2019 PLL season between the Chrome and Whipsnakes.

Week 4 - Minneapolis

- The Cannons' Marcus Holman scored his 300th career goal.
- The Chrome's Connor Farrell recorded his 500th career faceoff win.

All-Star Game and Skills Challenges - Louisville

- Jarrod Neumann set a PLL record in the fastest shot competition with a 121 MPH shot.

Week 7 - Dallas

- The Redwoods' Rob Pannell scored his 300th career goal in the Redwoods 10 to 16 loss to the Cannons.
- The 37 combined goals in the Archers 19–18 win against the Waterdogs tied the most combined goals ever in a PLL game, tying the record set in Week 3 of the 2023 PLL season in the game between the Waterdogs and Atlas.

Week 8 - Baltimore

- Highest attended two-day event in league history. Event on August 5 was sold-out.

Week 10 - Seattle

- The Atlas' Trevor Baptiste recorded his 500th career ground ball in Atlas' 13 to 14 loss to the Cannons.
- The Waterdogs scored a 2023 season single-game high 4 two-point goals in their 13 to 8 victory over Chaos LC.
- The Redwoods' Rob Pannell recorded his 268th career assist, breaking a tie with Joe Walters and putting him at second all-time on the assist leaderboard. The only player with more assists than him is 2023 Professional Lacrosse Hall of Fame inductee Ryan Boyle.

== Notable events ==
=== Announcing transition for each team to have a home city ===
On May 25, 2023 it was announced that the PLL would assign home cities to teams beginning with the 2024 season. Voting for the finalists began on July 3, 2023. The 26 finalist home-cities were announced during the 2023 PLL All-Star game. The PLL also announced that they would not be moving away from the touring model. Each team would have one home weekend and play a double-header when hosting. There will also be two neutral field weekends that no one team hosts. The final home cities were decided through a mix of fan-voting, ticketing performance, venue availability, and customer data. In a press release the PLL announced that home city assignments in November 2023. The PLL assigned each team a home city, as well as rebranding Chrome Lacrosse Club into the Denver Outlaws, on November 14.

== Regular-season statistical leaders ==
Individual
Statistic	Player	Position	Team
Points	Marcus Holman (44)	Attack	Cannons Lacrosse Club
One-point goals	Marcus Holman (29)	Attack	Cannons Lacrosse Club
Two-point goals	Connor Kelly (5)	Midfield	Philadelphia Waterdogs
Scoring Points	Marcus Holman (31)	Attack	Cannons Lacrosse Club
Assists	Dhane Smith (25)	Midfield	Utah Archers
Shots	Connor Fields (94)	Attack	Utah Archers
Shot Percentage	Eric Law (51.2%)	Attack	New York Atlas
Faceoff Percentage	Trevor Baptiste (77.4%)	Face-off	New York Atlas
Save Percentage	Dillon Ward (61.2%)	Goaltender	Philadelphia Waterdogs
Caused Turnovers	Ethan Rall (20)	Defense	Cannons Lacrosse Club

Team
Statistic	Team
Offensive
Scores per Game	Cannons LC (14.3)
Scores Against Average	Archers LC (11.1)
Shots per Game	Archers LC (47.4)
Shot Percentage	Cannons LC (31.2%)
One-point goals	Archers LC (118)
Two-point goals	Whipsnakes LC (15)
Turnovers Allowed (High)	Atlas LC (207)
Turnovers Allowed (Low)	Cannons LC and Waterdogs LC (149)
Defensive
Scores Against Average (Low)	Archers LC (11.1)
Scores Against Average (High)	Atlac LC (14)
Scores Allowed (Low)	Archers LC (111)
Scores Allowed (High)	Atlas LC (140)
Two-Points Goals Against (Low)	Cannons LC and Waterdogs LC (6)
Two-Point Goals Against (High)	Atlas LC and Cannons LC (11)
Caused Turnovers	Cannons LC (97)
Groundballs recovered	Archers LC (389)
Power Play and Penalty Kill
Power Play Goal Percentage	Cannons LC (75%)
Power Play Goals	Redwoods LC (13)
Penalty Kill Percentage	Atlas LC (68%)
Penalty Kills	Cannons LC (22)
Penalties (Low)	Whisnakes LC (12)
Penalties (High)	Cannons LC (38)
Penalty Minutes (Low)	Whipsnakes LC (10)
Penalty Minutes (High)	Cannons LC (27.5)

== Awards ==
=== Individual season awards ===
On August 24, the PLL announced the finalists for its 2023 End of Year Awards and the winners were announced on September 2 ahead of the PLL quarterfinals in Boston. The finalists for each award were determined via player vote. The winners were determined through a round of voting by PLL coaches, general managers, members of the Professional Lacrosse Hall of Fame, PLL front office and lacrosse advisors, and members of the media.

==== Award winners ====
2023 Premier Lacrosse League season award winners
Award	Winner	Team	Notable statistics	Notable notes
Jim Brown Most Valuable Player	Tom Schreiber	Archers LC	37 points (16 goals, 2 two-point goals, 17 assists) Most points by any midfielder this season	First professional lacrosse player to win three MVP's
Eamon McEneaney Attackman of the Year	Marcus Holman	Cannons LC	Led league with 44 points (30 goals, 1 two-point goal, 12 assists)	Tied for most points in a PLL regular season, most goals in a PLL regular season
Gait Brothers Midfielder of the Year	Tom Schreiber	Archers LC		
Dave Pietramala Defensive Player of the Year	Garret Epple	Redwoods LC		
Oren Lyons Goalie of the Year	Blaze Riorden	Chaos LC		
Paul Cantabene Face-Off Athlete of the Year	Trevor Baptiste	Atlas LC		
Brodie Merrill Long Stick Midfielder of the Year	Michael Ehrhardt	Whipsnakes LC		Fifth straight Brodie Merrill LSM of the Year award for Michael Ehrhardt
George Boiardi Hard Hat Award - Awarded to the SSDM of the year	Latrell Harris	Archers Lacrosse Club		
2023 Rookie of the Year	Tucker Dordevic	Whipsnakes LC	Led all rookies in scoring with 26 points (14 goals, 5 two-point goals, 2 assists)	
Dick Eddell Coach of the Year	Brian Holman	Cannons LC		First season as Cannons coach. Cannons had a 1–9 record during the 2022 season, finished the 2023 regular season with a record of7-3
Dave Huntley Sportsmanship Award	Zed Williams	Whipsnakes LC		
Welles Crowther Humanitarian Award	Eric Law	Atlas LC		
Jimmy Regan Teammate Award	Cole Kirst	Redwoods LC		
Brendan Looney Leadership Award	Tom Schreiber	Archers LC		

==== List of awards and finalists ====
The winner of the award are highlighted in Bold.

===== Jim Brown Most Valuable Player =====
- **Tom Schreiber** - Most points among midfielders (37)
- Blaze Riorden
- Asher Nolting - First PLL player to have a 20 goals and 20 assists in the same season (21 total goals, 20 assists)
- Marcus Holman - Led league in points with 44
- Trevor Baptiste

===== Eamon McEneaney Attackman of the Year =====
- **Marcus Holman** - Led league in points with 44
- Connor Fields
- Ryder Garnsey
- Asher Nolting

===== Gait Brothers Midfielder of the Year =====
- **Tom Schreiber**
- Zach Currier
- Dhane Smith

===== Dave Pietramala Defensive Player of the Year =====
- **Garrett Epple**
- Graeme Hossack
- Jack Rowlett
- Jack Kielty

===== Oren Lyons Goalie of the Year =====
- **Blaze Riorden**
- Brett Dobson
- Colin Kirst

===== Paul Cantabene Face-Off Athlete of the Year =====
- **Trevor Baptiste**
- Mike Sisselberger
- TD Ierlan

===== Brodie Merrill Long Stick Midfielder of the Year =====
- **Michael Ehrhardt**
- Ethan Rall
- Troy Reh
- Jared Conners

===== George Boiardi Hard Hat Award - Awarded to the SSDM of the year =====
- **Latrell Harris**
- Zach Goodrich
- Bubba Fairman

===== 2023 Rookie of the Year =====
- **Tucker Dordevic**
- Will Bowen
- Mike Sisselberger
- Ethan Rall

===== Dick Edell Coach of the Year =====
- **Brian Holman**
- Chris Bates
- Andy Towers

===== Dave Huntley Sportsmanship Award =====
- **Zed Williams**
- Eric Law
- Mark Glicini

===== Welles Crowther Humanitarian Award =====
- **Eric Law**
- Trevor Baptiste
- Romar Dennis

===== Jimmy Regan Teammate Award =====
- **Cole Kirst**
- Ryan Ambler
- Austin Kaut
- Jake Richard

===== Brendan Looney Leadership Award =====
- **Tom Schreiber**
- Blaze Riorden
- Tucker Durkin

== Coaching changes ==
=== Off-season changes ===
Cannons Lacrosse Club and Atlas Lacrosse Club both hired new head coaches for the 2023 season.

On February 5, 2023 it was announced that Cannons Lacrosse Club hired Brian Holman to be its new head coach/GM after Sean Quirk resigned due to health complications in December 2022. On March 9, 2023 it was announced that Mike Thompson and Jim Mitchell would be the assistant coaches.

Atlas Lacrosse Club hired Mike Pressler as its new head coach/GM after Ben Rubeor resigned in October 2022. His staff includes Steven Brooks (who was the interim head coach for Atlas during the 2023 Championship Series), and Kevin Unterstein.

On December 29, 2022, it was announced that Redwoods Lacrosse Club had hired John Grant Jr. to replace Todd MacFarlane as an assistant coach. MacFarlane had resigned from the position on December 5, 2022.

=== Changes after season ===
Chrome offensive coordinator, Matt Kerwick, resigned from his position on September 14, 2023. Kerwick joined Chrome's staff in 2022, where he coached alongside head coach Tim Soudan, and former college teammate, defensive coordinator Jacques Monte. Chrome finished the 2022 season fourth in scoring with strong rookie seasons from Brandon Nichtern and Logan Wisnauskas. Nichtern was unavailable for most of the 2023 season due to military obligations and the Chrome offense struggled; Chrome finished the 2023 season last in scoring, assists, shots, and shooting percentage.

== Uniforms ==
=== New Champion uniforms ===
For the 2023 PLL season each team was given a new set of uniforms developed by Champion. These uniforms replaced the uniforms that were made by Adidas. Champion began its partnership with the PLL in 2021 as the Official Sideline Partner, but in February, 2022 it was announced that Champion would begin making on-field apparel as well. No teams changed colorways during the change. The Waterdogs were given an alternate black jersey with gold trim as a reward for being PLL Champions. It is the first third jersey in the PLL. They wore the jerseys week one.

Of the eight teams, only two, the Cannons and the Chrome, do not have sponsorship patches on their regular jerseys. The other six teams have the following:

- Archers LC has a Progressive patch on the right sleeve
- Atlas LC has a ReCreate patch on the right sleeve
- Chaos LC has a Rebel Whiskey patch on the right sleeve
- Redwoods LC has a Progressive patch on the right sleeve
- Waterdogs LC has a Dude Wipes patch on the right side of the chest
- Whipsnakes LC has a Cash App patch on the right sleeve

=== Indigenous Heritage Weekend uniforms ===
During week four of the PLL season in Minneapolis, the PLL hosted Indigenous Heritage Weekend. As part of the celebrations each team wore limited jerseys that had been designed by Patrick Hunter—a two-spirit Ojibwe artist. Portions of the proceeds of the jersey sales went to benefit Anishinaabe Baagaadoewin, a non-profit dedicated to sharing Anishinaabe history and culture.

Alongside the thunderbird depicted on the jersey, each jersey had a Anishinaabe thunderbird patch on the left sleeve meant to represent power and strength for those wearing it. The shorts worn by players also included a thunderbird feather design. There was also had a PLL medicine wheel patch on each jersey. Lastly, there was an Every Child Matters patch on each jersey, an organization that raises awareness and honors for indigenous families and victims of the residential school systems.

=== Throwback uniforms ===
On August 9, 2023 the PLL unveiled a new set of throwback jerseys. The jerseys are "porthole mesh" style jerseys. The jerseys were worn during week eight of the PLL season in Denver. During the 2022 season the PLL also wore throwback uniforms during the leagues week eight stop in Denver. Each of the teams sponsored jersey patches remained on their throwback jerseys.

Alongside the jerseys the PLL unveiled throwback logos for each team as well. The logos were featured on both the jerseys and the shorts.

== 2023 PLL All-Star Game ==
The 2023 PLL All-Star Game was held at Dr. Mark & Cindy Lynn Stadium in Louisville, Kentucky, on Saturday, July 22, 2023. Differing from previous years, this year's All-Star Game featured a team of "Veterans" and a team of "Rising Stars" as selected by fan vote. The "Rising Stars" team was composed of players with less than four years of professional seasons, and the "Veterans" team was composed of players with four or more professional seasons. Rising Stars was coached by Waterdogs coach Andy Copeland and Redwoods coach Nat St. Laurent. The Veterans were coached by Chaos coach Andy Towers and Chrome coach Tim Soudan.

The Veterans defeated the Rising Stars 26 to 19. Will Manny was named MVP with 7 points (2 goals, 5 assists).

Before the game, there were four skills competitions: freestyle competition (score in the most unique way), accuracy challenge (score with accuracy, precision, and efficiency of shooting; players score points by hitting targets), goalie skills challenge (goalies score points by making saves and clearing the ball to different locations), and the fastest shot competition.

Skills Challenge Results
Challenge	Winner	Notes
Freestyle Competition	Xander Dickinson	
Accuracy Competition	Logan Wisnauskis	
Goalie Skills	Blaze Riorden	
Fastest Shot	Jarrod Neumann	Fastest PLL shot ever at 121 MPH
