= Max Adler (lacrosse) =

American lacrosse player (born 1994)

Personal information
- Nationality: Israeli; American
- Born: July 6, 1994 (age 32) Fort Lauderdale, Florida, U.S.
- Height: 5 ft 10 in (178 cm)
- Weight: 190 lb (86 kg; 13 st 8 lb)

Sport
- Position: Faceoff specialist (field), Defense (box)
- Shoots: Right
- NCAA team: Bentley (2017)
- NLL team: Vancouver Warriors
- MLL draft: 61st overall, 2017; Denver Outlaws
- MLL teams: Denver Outlaws
- PLL team: Chaos LC

Career highlights
- MLL: 1x All-Star (2019); 1x Champion (2018); PLL: 1x Champion (2021); NLL: 1x Champion (2023)

Max Adler (Hebrew: מקס אדלר) is an Israeli-American professional lacrosse player. He played for DII Bentley University, before being drafted by the Denver Outlaws of the Major League Lacrosse. He now plays for the Chaos Lacrosse Club of the Premier Lacrosse League where he is a faceoff specialist. Indoors, he plays for the Vancouver Warriors of the National Lacrosse League as a defenseman.

In international play, he has represented Israel in the FIL World Lacrosse Championship.

== Playing career ==
=== NCAA ===
A native of Fort Lauderdale, Florida, Adler attended Northfield Mount Hermon School and initially intended to pursue a collegiate wrestling career, but injuries forced him to stop. He played lacrosse for the first time during his freshman season. Adler walked onto the lacrosse team at Bentley during his freshman season and was initially their fifth faceoff specialist, though over his four years, he worked his way into a starting role and finished his collegiate career as a two-time Division II All-American.

=== MLL ===
He was drafted by the Denver Outlaws, winning a spot in the lineup after primary faceoff specialist Tommy Kelly suffered an injury. Adler would help lead the Outlaws to the 2018 Steinfeld Trophy, leading MLL with a 57.7% faceoff winning percentage. On August 10, 2019, against the Chesapeake Bayhawks, Adler won the final 23 faceoffs he took, his 95.83% set a new MLL record. 2019 MLL-All Star. 2020 MLL F/O Specialist of the Year.

=== PLL ===
Adler declined an invitation to join the Premier Lacrosse League upon its founding in 2018 citing loyalty to the Outlaws and a desire to play for a city-based team. However, once MLL merged with PLL, Adler joined Chaos Lacrosse Club, winning the PLL Championship in his first season.

=== NLL ===
Despite having no prior experience in box lacrosse, Adler joined the Buffalo Bandits midway through the 2022 season as the Bandits attempted to improve on their issues winning faceoffs. Adler joined many of his Chaos teammates on the Bandits, and scored his first NLL goal on a penalty shot against the Rochester Knighthawks. In the 2022–23 season, Adler was an integral part of the Bandits' championship winning roster, including winning 64.5% of faceoffs in the NLL Finals against the Colorado Mammoth. During the Bandits' 13–4 game 3 win to clinch the championship, Adler notched his first career playoff goal, winning a faceoff clean and beating Dillon Ward to give the Bandits a 12–4 lead. After the season, Adler stepped away from lacrosse to focus on his personal life and career, but hopes to return to the sport.

== Personal ==
Adler works as a financial analyst for ESPN in addition to his lacrosse career. His brother, Mike, played lacrosse at Saint Joseph's University and Duke University.

== Statistics ==
=== NCAA ===
Season	Team	GP	GS	G	A	Pts	FOW	FOT	FO%	GB
2014	Bentley	7	0	0	0	0	5	7	71.4%	1
2015	Bentley	13	13	0	0	0	124	188	65.9%	57
2016	Bentley	13	12	1	1	2	195	268	72.8%	119
2017	Bentley	13	13	2	0	2	201	296	67.9%	124
Total		46	38	3	1	4	525	759	69.2%	301

=== MLL ===
Season	Team	Regular season											Playoffs										
Season	Team	GP	G	2PG	A	Pts	Sh	GB	Pen	PIM	FOW	FOA	GP	G	2PG	A	Pts	Sh	GB	Pen	PIM	FOW	FOA
2017	Denver Outlaws	3	1	0	0	1	3	19	0	0	46	83	–	–	–	–	–	–	–	–	–	–	–
2018	Denver Outlaws	7	0	0	1	1	3	49	1	0.5	131	227	2	0	0	0	0	1	18	0	0	34	58
2019	Denver Outlaws	15	5	0	3	8	13	110	1	1	256	439	2	1	0	0	1	2	17	0	0	27	56
2020	Denver Outlaws	4	1	0	0	1	2	22	0	0	46	71	–	–	–	–	–	–	–	–	–	–	–
		29	7	0	4	11	21	200	2	1.5	479	820	4	1	0	0	1	3	35	0	0	61	114
Career total:		33	8	0	4	12	24	235	2	1.5	540	934											

GP–Games played; G–Goals; 2PG–2-point goals; A–Assists; Pts–Points; Sh–Shots; GB–Ground balls; Pen–Penalties; PIM–Penalty minutes; FOW–Faceoffs won; FOA–Faceoffs attempted

=== PLL ===
Season	Team	Regular season											Playoffs										
Season	Team	GP	G	2PG	A	Pts	Sh	GB	Pen	PIM	FOW	FOA	GP	G	2PG	A	Pts	Sh	GB	Pen	PIM	FOW	FOA
2021	Chaos	7	1	0	2	3	4	38	0	0	81	167	3	0	0	0	0	3	24	0	0	39	71
2022	Chaos	4	0	0	1	1	1	20	2	1	39	92	3	0	0	0	0	2	17	0	0	33	59
2023	Chaos	1	0	0	0	0	1	7	0	0	11	24	–	–	–	–	–	–	–	–	–	–	–
		12	1	0	3	4	6	65	2	1	131	283	6	0	0	0	0	5	41	0	0	72	130
Career total:		18	1	0	3	4	11	106	2	1	203	413											

GP–Games played; G–Goals; 2PG–2-point goals; A–Assists; Pts–Points; Sh–Shots; GB–Ground balls; Pen–Penalties; PIM–Penalty minutes; FOW–Faceoffs won; FOA–Faceoffs attempted

Max Adler		Regular season									Playoffs								
Season	Team	GP	G	A	Pts	LB	PIM	Pts/GP	LB/GP	PIM/GP	GP	G	A	Pts	LB	PIM	Pts/GP	LB/GP	PIM/GP
2022	Buffalo Bandits	9	1	0	1	17	6	0.11	1.89	0.67	6	0	0	0	16	0	0.00	2.67	0.00
2023	Buffalo Bandits	19	0	1	1	66	2	0.05	3.47	0.11	6	1	0	1	41	0	0.17	6.83	0.00
		28	1	1	2	83	8	0.07	2.96	0.29	12	1	0	1	57	0	0.08	4.75	0.00
Career Total:		40	2	1	3	140	8	0.08	3.50	0.20									

GP–Games played; G–Goals; A–Assists; Pts–Points; LB–Loose balls; PIM–Penalty minutes; Pts/GP–Points per games played; LB/GP–Loose balls per games played; PIM/GP–Penalty minutes per games played.
