= Max Adler =

Max Adler may refer to:

- Max Adler (Sears) (1866–1952), American businessman and philanthropist
- Max Adler (Marxist) (1873–1937), Austrian social theorist
- Max Spencer Adler (died 1979), founder of Spencer Gifts
- Max Adler (actor) (born 1986), American actor
- Max Adler (lacrosse) (born 1994), American-Israeli lacrosse player
