= Maryland Whipsnakes =

Field lacrosse team in the PLL

- Full name: Maryland Whipsnakes Lacrosse Club
- Founded: 2019
- League: Premier Lacrosse League
- Based in: Baltimore, Maryland
- Stadium: Homewood Field
- Colors: Black, Teal, Red, and White
- President: None
- Head coach: Jim Stagnitta
- Championships: 2 (2019, 2020)
- Website: Official website

The Maryland Whipsnakes are a professional field lacrosse team based in Baltimore, Maryland, that competes in the Premier Lacrosse League (PLL). The Whipsnakes are one of the six founding members of the PLL and the winner of its first two championships; the 2019 season and the 2020 Championship Tournament. Notable players include Jake Bernhardt, TJ Malone, and Rob Pannell.

== Roster ==
2025 Maryland Whipsnakes
#	Name	Nationality	Position	Shot	Height	Weight	College	Grad year	High school	Hometown	Ref.
3	Rob Pannell	(United States)	Attack	R/L	5 ft 10 in	195 lbs	Cornell	2013	Smithtown West	Smithtown, New York	
4	James Shipley	(United States)	SSDM	R/L	5 ft 10 in	190 lbs	Penn	2024	Weddington	Weddington, North Carolina	
5	Petey LaSalla	(United States)	Faceoff	Right	5 ft 7 in	185 lbs	Virginia	2023	Rocky Point	Miller Place, New York	
6	Truitt Sunderland	(United States)	Midfield	Right	5 ft 10 in	165 lbs	Virginia	2026	Calvert Hall	Baltimore, Maryland	
7	TJ Malone	(United States)	Attack	Left	5 ft 11 in	185 lbs	Penn State	2024	Haverford	West Chester, Pennsylvania	
8	Eric Kolar	(United States)	SSDM	Right	5 ft 11 in	200 lbs	Maryland	2026	The Hill School	Mount Airy, Maryland	
10	Colin Heacock	(United States)	Midfield	R/L	6 ft 3 in	220 lbs	Maryland	2017	Boys' Latin	Catonsville, Maryland	
11	Jack McDonald	(United States)	LSM	Right	6 ft 5 in	210 lbs	Maryland	2025	South Side	Rockville Centre, New York	
12	Aidan Carroll	(United States)	Midfield	R/L	6 ft 0 in	190 lbs	Georgetown	2025	Boston College High School	Milton, Massachusetts	
13	Nathan Kapp	(United States)	Faceoff	Right	5 ft 11 in	205 lbs	Jacksonville	2024	Middleton	Middleton, Wisconsin	
14	Tim Muller	(United States)	Defense	Right	6 ft 2 in	215 lbs	Maryland	2017	Chaminade	Garden City, New York	
15	Joe Juengerkes	(United States)	SSDM	Right	6 ft 0 in	190 lbs	Rutgers	2026	Islip	Islip, New York	
19	Emmet Carroll	(United States)	Goalie	Right	6 ft 3 in	205 lbs	Penn	2025	Rye	Rye, New York	
21	Matt Knote	(United States)	Goalie	Right	5 ft 10 in	220 lbs	UMass	2024	Eastport-South Manor	Speonk, New York	
22	Joey Spallina	(United States)	Attack	Right	5 ft 11 in	192 lbs	Syracuse	2026	Mount Sinai	Mount Sinai, New York	
23	Richie Connell	(United States)	Attack	Left	6 ft 5 in	220 lbs	Denver	2024	The Hill Academy	Evergreen, Colorado	
25	Matthew Paolatto	(United States)	Faceoff	Right	5 ft 11 in	185 lbs	Rutgers	2025	Dover-Sherborn	Sherborn, Massachusetts	
27	Brad Smith	(United States)	Midfield	R/L	6 ft 3 in	205 lbs	Duke	2019	Mountain Lakes	Mountain Lakes, New Jersey	
33	Matthew Dunn	(United States)	Defense	Right	6 ft 3 in	224 lbs	Maryland	2016	Loyola Blakefield	Baltimore, Maryland	
34	Payton Rezanka	(United States)	SSDM	Left	5 ft 11 in	205 lbs	Loyola	2023	Cathedral Catholic	San Diego, California	
35	Billy Dwan III	(United States)	Defense	Left	6 ft 4 in	225 lbs	Syracuse	2026	Loyola Blakefield	Lutherville, Maryland	
36	Ajax Zappitello	(United States)	Defense	Right	6 ft 1 in	190 lbs	Maryland	2024	Sunset	Portland, Oregon	
39	Colin Squires	(United States)	LSM	Right	6 ft 2 in	190 lbs	Denver	2021	West Linn	West Linn, Oregon	
41	Matt Brandau	(United States)	Midfield	R/L	5 ft 11 in	190 lbs	Yale	2024	Boys' Latin	Timonium, Maryland	
43	Jack Posey	(United States)	Defense	Right	6 ft 1 in	210 lbs	Penn State	2024	Freedom	South Riding, Virginia	
51	Adam Poitras	(Canada)	Midfield	Left	6 ft 2 in	180 lbs	Loyola	2024	The Hill Academy	Whitby, Ontario	
85	Christian Mazur	(United States)	SSDM	Right	6 ft 1 in	205 lbs	Army	2025	Westfield	Westfield, New Jersey	
91	Joe Nardella	(United States)	Faceoff	Right	5 ft 10 in	200 lbs	Rutgers	2015	Cazenovia	Cazenovia, New York	
	Michael Boehm	(United States)	Attack	Right	5 ft 10 in	170 lbs	Michigan	2024	St. Ignatius	Rocky River, Ohio	
	Blake Eiland	(United States)	SSDM	Right	6 ft 0 in	200 lbs	Ohio State	2026	Western Reserve Academy	Delaware, Ohio	
	Shun Ito*	(Japan)	Goalie	Right							

(C) indicates captain Source:

*Indicates player is on Unavailable to Travel list

**Indicates player is on PUP list

=== Coaching staff ===
- Head coach – Jim Stagnitta
- Assistant coach – Drew Snider
- Assistant coach – Brian Voelker

== All-time draft selections ==
2019

Rnd.	Pick #	Player	Pos.	College	Conf.	2019 Accolades
1	4	Alex Woodall	Faceoff	Towson	Colonial Athletic Association	Second-Team All-American, First-Team CAA: *Note* (Woodall chose to play in the MLL for the Atlanta Blaze who drafted him with the 1st pick in the 2019 draft)
2	9	Brad Smith	Midfield	Duke	Atlantic Coast Conference	Second-Team All-American, First-Team ACC
3	16	Isaac Paparo	Defense	UMass	Colonial Athletic Association	Second-Team All-American, First-Team CAA
4	21	John Daniggelis	Midfield	Yale	Ivy League	Honorable Mention All-American, First-Team Ivy League

2020 Entry Draft

The 2020 player entry draft occurred on March 16 for teams to select players arriving from rival Major League Lacrosse. On March 4, Paul Burmeister and NBCSN hosted an entry draft lottery for selection order. Out of 100 balls to select from, Waterdogs had 40, Chrome had 25, Atlas had 15, Archers had 10, Chaos had 6, Redwoods had 3, and the champion Whipsnakes had 1.

Rob Pannell was announced to be transferring to the PLL on March 9, followed by 15 other players the following day, which comprised the selection pool for the entry draft. A total of 14 players were selected in the entry draft with remaining new players entering the league player pool.

Draft results
Rnd.	Pick #	Player	Pos.	College
1	5	Zed Williams	Midfield	Virginia
2	12	TJ Comizio	Midfield	Villanova

2020 College Draft

Rnd.	Pick #	Player	Pos.	College
1	7	Sean New	Defense	Holy Cross
2	14	Matt Hubler	Midfield	Johns Hopkins

2021 Entry Draft

Rnd.	Pick #	Player	Pos.	College
1	7	Chris Aslanian	Attack/Midfield	Hobart
2	15	Charlie Hayes	SSDM	Detroit
3	23	Bryan Cole	Midfield	Maryland

2021 College Draft

Rnd.	Pick #	Player	Pos.	College
1	7	Connor Kirst	Midfield	Rutgers
2	16	Ryan Tierney	Attack	Hofstra
3	23	Colin Squires	Defense	Denver
4	31	Nick Grill	Defense	Maryland

2022 College Draft

Rnd.	Pick #	Player	Pos.	College
1	7	Roman Puglise	SSDM	Maryland
2	15	Wheaton Jackoboice	Midfield	Notre Dame
3	20	Keegan Khan	Attack	Maryland
4	26	Jackson Reid	Attack	Ohio State
4	31	Colin Hinton	Defense	Jacksonville

2023 College Draft

Round	Pick	Player	Position	College
1	6	Tucker Dordevic	Attack	Georgetown
2	14	Petey LaSalla	Faceoff	Virginia
3	22	Garrett Leadmon	Midfield	Duke
4	30	Elijah Gash	Defense	Albany

2024 College Draft

Round	Pick	Player	Position	College
1	3	Ajax Zappitello	Defense	Maryland
3	17	TJ Malone	Attack	Penn State
3	22	Stephen Zupicich	LSM	Villanova
4	27	Adam Poitras	Attack	Loyola

2025 College Draft

Round	Pick	Player	Position	College
1	7	Aidan Carroll	Attack	Georgetown
3	17	Scott Smith	Defense	Johns Hopkins
3	20	Emmet Carroll	Goalie	Penn
3	24	Christian Mazur	Defensive Midfield	Army

2026 College Draft

Round	Pick	Player	Position	College
1	3	Joey Spallina	Attack	Syracuse
2	11	Billy Dwan III	Defense	Syracuse
3	19	Blake Eiland	SSDM	Ohio State
4	27	Eric Kolar	SSDM	Maryland
4	32	Braden Erksa	Attack	Maryland

== Season results ==
2019
Week	Location	Date	Opponent	Result
1	Boston, Massachusetts	June 1, 2019	Chaos	W 15–14 (OT)
2	New York City	June 8, 2019	Chrome	W 12–11 (OT)
3	Chicago, Illinois	June 15, 2019	Archers	W 11–10 (OT)
4	Baltimore, Maryland	June 22, 2019	Atlas	W 15–10
5	Atlanta, Georgia	June 29, 2019	Redwoods	L 11–14
6	Washington, DC	July 6, 2019	Atlas	W 11–9
All-Star Break	Los Angeles, California	July 21, 2019	Bye	Bye
7	Denver, Colorado	July 27, 2019	Chaos	L 12–13
8	San Jose, California	August 10, 2019	Chrome	L 16–20
9	Hamilton, Ontario	August 18, 2019	Redwoods	W 17–4
10	Albany, New York	August 25, 2019	Archers	L 11–8
Playoffs Round 1	Columbus, Ohio	September 7, 2019	Chaos	W 15–7
Finals	Philadelphia, Pennsylvania	September 21, 2019	Redwoods	W 12–11

2020
Game	Location	Date	Opponent	Result
1	Herriman, Utah	July 25, 2020	Redwoods	W 13–9
2	Herriman, Utah	July 30, 2020	Atlas	W 15–6
3	Herriman, Utah	July 31, 2020	Chaos	W 12–7
4	Herriman, Utah	August 2, 2020	Archers	W 17–11
5 (Semifinal)	Herriman, Utah	August 6, 2020	Redwoods	W 13–12
6 (PLL Championship)	Herriman, Utah	August 9, 2020	Chaos	W 12–6

2021
Game	Location	Date	Opponent	Result
1	Foxborough, Massachusetts	June 5, 2021	Chaos	W 13–7
2	Kennesaw, Georgia	June 12, 2021	Cannons	W 15–14
3	Baltimore, Maryland	June 25, 2021	Atlas	W 12–11
4	Baltimore, Maryland	June 27, 2021	Chrome	L 6–16
5	Hempstead, New York	July 4, 2021	Archers	W 15–14
6	Eagan, Minnesota	July 10, 2021	Redwoods	L 7–13
7	Colorado Springs, Colorado	July 31, 2021	Waterdogs	L 6–11
8	Albany, New York	August 13, 2021	Redwoods	W 14–12
9	Albany, New York	August 15, 2021	Archers	L 14–15
10 (Quarterfinal)	Sandy, Utah	August 21, 2021	Redwoods	W 14–13
11 (Semifinal)	Chester, Pennsylvania	September 5, 2021	Waterdogs	W 14–10
11 (Championship)	Washington D.C.	September 19, 2021	Chaos	L 9–14

2022
Game	Location	Date	Opponent	Result
1	Albany, New York	June 4	Chaos	W 9–8
2	Charlotte, North Carolina	June 11	Waterdogs	W 12–11
3	Hempstead, New York	June 17	Atlas	W 12–9
4	Baltimore, Maryland	June 24	Redwoods	W 12–11
5	Eagan, Minnesota	July 2	Waterdogs	L 10–11
6	Fairfield, Connecticut	July 23	Chaos	W 14–12
7	Frisco, Texas	July 30	Chrome	W 9–8
8	Denver, Colorado	August 6	Archers	W 13–11
9	Herriman, Utah	August 12	Atlas	W 16–8
10	Tacoma, Washington	August 21	Cannons	W 11–9
11 (Semifinal)	Washington D.C.	September 11	Waterdogs	L 10–11

2023 Championship Series
Game	Location	Date	Opponent	Result
1	Springfield, VA	February 22	Atlas	L 16–29
2	Springfield, VA	February 23	Archers	L 23–26
3	Springfield, VA	February 24	Chrome	L 14–18
4 (Semifinals)	Springfield, VA	February 25	Atlas	L 21–30

2023
Game	Location	Date	Opponent	Result
1	Albany, New York	June 4	Chrome	L 11–12
2	Charlotte, North Carolina	June 10	Atlas	L 11–12
3	Columbus, Ohio	June 17	Redwoods	W 18–11
4	Eagan, Minnesota	July 9	Archers	L 12–15
5	Fairfield, Connecticut	July 14	Waterdogs	L 13–16
6	Frisco, Texas	July 30	Chaos	W 17–16
7	Baltimore, Maryland	August 5	Chrome	W 12–5
8	Denver, Colorado	August 11	Chaos	W 12–10
9	Tacoma, Washington	August 18	Archers	L 11–16
10	Herriman, Utah	August 26	Cannons	L 11–15
11 (Quarterfinal)	Foxborough, Massachusetts	September 4	Waterdogs	L 12–15

2024
Game	Location	Date	Opponent	Result
1	Albany, New York	June 2	Atlas	L 13–17
2	Charlotte, North Carolina	June 8	Cannons	L 9–13
3	Villanova, Pennsylvania	June 16	Waterdogs	W 15–14 (OT)
4	Eagan, Minnesota	June 28	Atlas	W 16–12
5	Cambridge, Massachusetts	July 6	Archers	L 11–16
6	Fairfield, Connecticut	July 19	Chaos	L 9–10
7	San Diego, California	July 28	Redwoods	W 18–13
8	Baltimore, Maryland	August 3	Waterdogs	W 12–6
9	Baltimore, Maryland	August 4	Cannons	W 16–14
10	Denver, Colorado	August 9	Outlaws	W 16–9
11 (Quarterfinal)	Foxborough, Massachusetts	September 2	Outlaws	W 11–10
12 (Semifinal)	Uniondale, New York	September 7	Atlas	W 12–11 (OT)
13 (Championship)	Chester, Pennsylvania	September 15	Archers	L 8–12

2025 Championship Series
Game	Location	Date	Opponent	Result
1	Springfield, VA	February 11	Atlas	L 13–25
2	Springfield, VA	February 13	Cannons	L 21–34
3	Springfield, VA	February 15	Archers	L 25–29

== PLL Award winners ==
Jim Brown Most Valuable Player

- Matt Rambo: 2019
- Zed Williams: 2020

Eamon McEneaney Attackman of the Year

- Matt Rambo: 2019
- Zed Williams: 2020

Dave Pietramala Defensive Player of the Year

- Matt Dunn: 2020, 2024

Oren Lyons Goalie of the Year

- Kyle Bernlohr, 2022

Brodie Merrill Long Stick Midfielder of the Year

- Michael Ehrhardt: 2019, 2020, 2021, 2022, 2023

Paul Cantabene Faceoff Athlete of the Year

- Joe Nardella: 2020

George Boiardi Short Stick Midfielder of the Year

- Ty Warner: 2020

Rookie of the Year

- Tucker Dordevic: 2023
- TJ Malone: 2024
- Joey Spallina: 2026

Dave Huntley Sportsmanship Award

- Zed Williams: 2023
- Joe Nardella: 2025

== Head coaches ==
#	Name	Term	Regular season				Playoffs			
#	Name	Term	GP	W	L	Pct	GP	W	L	Pct
1	Jim Stagnitta	2019–	53	34	19	.642	12	8	4	.667

== All-time record vs. PLL Clubs ==
Opponent	Won	Lost	Percentage	Streak
Archers	4	5	.444	Lost 4
Atlas	8	2	.800	Won 2
Cannons	3	2	.600	Won 1
Chaos	9	4	.692	Lost 1
Outlaws	4	4	.500	Won 3
Redwoods	9	2	.818	Won 5
Waterdogs	4	5	.444	Won 2
Totals	41	24	.631	
