= Blaze Riorden =

American lacrosse player (born 1994)

Personal information
- Nationality: American
- Born: February 13, 1994 (age 32) Fairport, New York, U.S.
- Height: 6 ft 0 in (183 cm)
- Weight: 215 lb (98 kg; 15 st 5 lb)

Sport
- Position: Goaltender (field), Forward (box)
- Shoots: Left
- NCAA team: Albany (2016)
- NLL team Former teams: Rochester Knighthawks; Buffalo Bandits Philadelphia Wings
- MLL draft: 51st overall, 2016; Rochester Rattlers
- MLL teams: Rochester/Dallas Rattlers
- PLL team: Carolina Chaos

Career highlights
- NCAA: America East Defensive Player of the Year (2016); Third Team All American (2016); 3x First Team All America East (2014-16); Second Team All America East (2013); America East All-Rookie Team (2013); Albany all-time leader in saves (849); PLL: 5× Oren Lyons Goalie of the Year (2019-21, 2023, 2024); 4x All-Star (2019, 2021-23); PLL Season MVP (2021); PLL Championship MVP (2021); PLL Championship (2021); Most saves in a single game (25); International: All-World Team (2023)
Medal record
Representing United States
Men's lacrosse
World Lacrosse Championship
Winner	2023 San Diego
Men's box lacrosse
World Lacrosse Box Championships
Runner-up	2024 Utica
Third place	2015 Onondaga
Third place	2019 Langley

Blaze Riorden (born February 13, 1994) is an American professional lacrosse player who plays as a goaltender for the Carolina Chaos of the Premier Lacrosse League and as a forward for the Rochester Knighthawks of the National Lacrosse League, captaining the former. In the PLL, he has won three consecutive Oren Lyons Goalie of the Year awards, making him the first goalie to do so. He is also one of only two field lacrosse goalies to win league MVP at the professional level and is widely regarded as one of the greatest goalies of all time, and the most successful goalie of his generation.

== Early life and career ==
Riorden was raised in Fairport, New York, the son of Mike and Jeannie Riorden. He has one brother, Connor. Riorden's family had season tickets to see the Rochester Knighthawks, and he began playing lacrosse at the age of four as an attackman, however he switched to goalie part time as a child when he injured his team's goalie with a shot, and would play both positions throughout high school. While at Fairport High School, he would earn three varsity letters each in lacrosse and football, and won two Section V state championships and committed to play lacrosse at University at Albany where he would have the opportunity to play in goal and on man-up offense.

== Collegiate career ==
Riorden started 18 games in goal as a freshman at Albany, where he posted the second-most wins in program history with 13. He would be named to the America East All-Rookie Team as well as second-team all-league.

As a sophomore, Riorden finished third in the nation in saves per game and twelfth in save percentage, leading the America East in both categories, and being named first-team all-conference at the end of the season. He would backstop Albany to their first NCAA Tournament win in seven years by making 13 saves and allowing just six goals in the first round against Loyola. He would also get some opportunities to play attack on man up, scoring his first career goal against Bryant.

In his junior season, Riorden would lead the America East in save percentage, saves per game, and goals against average, once again making first-team all-league. He would make 214 saves on the season, good for eighth in Albany history, and contributed to the program's first-ever shutout in a game against UMass Lowell. He also made national headlines for his coast-to-coast goal against Cornell in the NCAA Tournament, being nominated for the ESPY Award for Best Play.

In his senior season, Riorden would set Albany's career record for saves and was named a finalist for the Tewaaraton Award, as well as a third-team All-American, first-team all-conference, and America East Defensive Player of the Year.

Blaze Riorden Albany statistics
Season	GP	GS	Minutes	Saves	Sv%	GA	GAA
2013	18	18	1036:27	199	0.491	206	11.93
2014	18	18	1040:01	237	0.549	195	11.25
2015	19	19	1015:31	214	0.560	168	9.93
2016	16	16	948:21	199	0.565	153	9.68
Total	71	71	4040:20	849	0.540	722	10.72

== Box career ==
Following his freshman season at Albany, Riorden was invited by teammate Ty Thompson to spend the summer on the Akwesasne Reservation, where he played box lacrosse for the first time as a forward. He played Junior B lacrosse for the Akwesasne Indians, and then returned every summer during his collegiate career. After his college career, he traveled to Brampton, Ontario to play Senior A Box before eventually winning a spot with the Buffalo Bandits in 2017, playing nine games before being released. He then joined the Philadelphia Wings for their inaugural season in 2018.

Riorden was named captain of the Wings ahead of the 2023–24 season.

Riorden was traded to his hometown Rochester Knighthawks on March 9, 2026, in exchange for a second-round pick in the 2027 NLL Draft.

Riorden has also represented the United States in the 2015 (where he was the only college player) and 2019 editions of the World Indoor Lacrosse Championship, winning bronze medals both times.

=== NLL statistics ===
Blaze Riorden		Regular season									Playoffs								
Season	Team	GP	G	A	Pts	LB	PIM	Pts/GP	LB/GP	PIM/GP	GP	G	A	Pts	LB	PIM	Pts/GP	LB/GP	PIM/GP
2017	Buffalo Bandits	9	6	13	19	20	0	2.11	2.22	0.00	–	–	–	–	–	–	–	–	–
2019	Philadelphia Wings	17	23	31	54	51	6	3.18	3.00	0.35	–	–	–	–	–	–	–	–	–
2020	Philadelphia Wings	14	14	28	42	41	6	3.00	2.93	0.43	–	–	–	–	–	–	–	–	–
2022	Philadelphia Wings	18	21	22	43	65	2	2.39	3.61	0.11	1	0	0	0	0	0	0.00	0.00	0.00
2023	Philadelphia Wings	18	34	39	73	74	9	4.06	4.11	0.50	–	–	–	–	–	–	–	–	–
2024	Philadelphia Wings	16	17	25	42	27	2	2.63	1.69	0.13	–	–	–	–	–	–	–	–	–
2025	Philadelphia Wings	18	21	20	41	28	14	2.28	1.56	0.78	–	–	–	–	–	–	–	–	–
2026	Philadelphia Wings	11	7	11	18	25	2	1.64	2.27	0.18	–	–	–	–	–	–	–	–	–
2026	Rochester Knighthawks	5	6	6	12	5	0	2.40	1.00	0.00	–	–	–	–	–	–	–	–	–
		126	149	195	344	336	41	2.73	2.67	0.33	1	0	0	0	0	0	0.00	0.00	0.00
Career Total:		127	149	195	344	336	41	2.71	2.65	0.32									

GP–Games played; G–Goals; A–Assists; Pts–Points; LB–Loose balls; PIM–Penalty minutes; Pts/GP–Points per games played; LB/GP–Loose balls per games played; PIM/GP–Penalty minutes per games played.

== Professional field career ==
=== MLL ===
Riorden was drafted 51st overall by the Rochester Rattlers in the 2016 MLL Draft. He would primarily serve as a backup to John Galloway in his first two seasons, though he saw more action in his third season following the team's move to Dallas, in part due to Galloway's participation in the 2018 World Lacrosse Championship. He made his first career start in a 15–9 win over the Chesapeake Bayhawks in which he made 16 saves.

=== PLL ===
Riorden was part of the original group of players to join Paul Rabil's PLL, being assigned to Chaos Lacrosse Club. During his first season, he was named as an All-Star and won the inaugural Oren Lyons Goalie of the Year Award. He would once again win the award the following season while helping Chaos to the Championship Game. In 2021, he was named as a captain for the All-Star Game, though he was ultimately unable to participate due to injury. He was also a finalist for the Jim Brown MVP Award.

Riorden set the PLL single game save record on June 6, 2025, making 25 saves in a win over the Denver Outlaws.

Blaze Riorden PLL Statistics
Regular season								Playoffs					
Season	Team	GP	Saves	Sv%	SA	SAA	2ptGA	GP	Saves	Sv%	SA	SAA	2ptGA
2019	Chaos	10	153	55%	126	12.6	3	2	28	54%	27	13.5	3
2020	Chaos	7	119	61%	78	11.0	3	N/A					
2021	Chaos	9	149	61%	103	11.5	3	3	45	63%	28	14.0	1
2022	Chaos	10	137	54%	126	12.6	8	3	45	68%	21	7.0	0
2023	Chaos	9	135	59%	103	11.4	11	1	16	53%	15	15.0	1
2024	Chaos	8	92	59%	66	9.8	3	2	24	65%	14	7.0	1
2025	Chaos	10	149	57%	122	12.6	11	1	10	44%	14	14.0	1
2026	Chaos	11	142	54%	126	12.3	11	N/A					

== Playing style ==
Riorden has been called a "once in a generation talent" by the PLL. He is known for using a Butterfly style, similar to a hockey goaltender, being one of the first field lacrosse goalies to do so. He is also known for his stick skills due to his background as an attackman and due to this, he is able to create transition opportunities for his teammates.
