= Carolina Chaos =

Field lacrosse team in the PLL

- Full name: Carolina Chaos Lacrosse Club
- Founded: 2019
- League: Premier Lacrosse League
- Team history: Chaos Lacrosse Club (2019–2023); Carolina Chaos (2024–present)
- Based in: Charlotte, North Carolina
- Stadium: American Legion Memorial Stadium
- Colors
- Owner: Premier Lacrosse League
- Head coach: Steven Brooks
- General manager: Spencer Ford
- Championships: 1 (2021)
- Championship Series Titles: 1 (2026)
- Website: Carolina Chaos

The Carolina Chaos are a professional field lacrosse team based in Charlotte, North Carolina, that competes in the Premier Lacrosse League (PLL). The Chaos are one of the six founding members of the PLL for the 2019 season. Notable players include Blaze Riorden, Jarrod Neumann and Troy Reh. Chaos were crowned PLL Champions for the first time in team history with a 14 - 9 victory over the Whipsnakes in the 2021 PLL Championship. The Chaos won the 2026 PLL Championship Series, with newly appointed head coach Steven Brooks leading the team to the title. During the tournament, Shane Knobloch earned the Golden Stick Award after recording 30 points, the highest total in the competition.

== Roster ==
2025 Carolina Chaos Lacrosse Club
#	Name	Nationality	Position	Shot	Height	Weight	College	Grad year	High school	Hometown	Ref.
0	Blaze Riorden (C)	(United States)	Goalie	Left	6 ft 0 in	230 lbs	Albany	2016	Fairport	Fairport, New York	
2	Leif Hagerup	(United States)	SSDM	Right	6 ft 1 in	175 lbs	North Carolina	2026	Gonzaga	Washington, DC	
3	Chris Aslanian	(United States)	Midfield	R/L	6 ft 3 in	205 lbs	Hobart	2019	Hun	Westfield, New Jersey	
5	Henry Bard	(United States)	Defense	Right	6 ft 3 in	215 lbs	Duke	2026	Lower Merion	Wynnewood, Pennsylvania	
7	Eric Spanos	(United States)	Attack	Right	6 ft 3 in	215 lbs	Maryland	2026	Malvern Prep	Pottstown, Pennsylvania	
9	Ray Dearth	(United States)	SSDM	Right	6 ft 2 in	205 lbs	Harvard	2025	Ridgefield	Ridgefield, Connecticut	
10	Troy Reh	(United States)	LSM	Right	5 ft 11 in	185 lbs	Albany	2018	Rocky Point	Rocky Point, New York	
11	Chad Palumbo	(United States)	Midfield	Left	6 ft 2 in	205 lbs	Princeton	2026	Noble & Greenough	Newton, Massachusetts	
14	Austin Kaut	(United States)	Goalie	Left	6 ft 1 in	225 lbs	Penn State	2014	Springfield-Delco	Morton, Pennsylvania	
15	Ross Scott	(United States)	Attack	Right	5 ft 9 in	175 lbs	Rutgers	2024	West Linn	West Linn, Oregon	
16	Mark Glicini (C)	(United States)	LSM	Right	6 ft 1 in	200 lbs	Yale	2016	Deerfield	Mahwah, New Jersey	
18	Scott Smith	(United States)	Defense	Right	6 ft 1 in	210 lbs	Johns Hopkins	2024	Conestoga	Berwyn, Pennsylvania	
19	Jackson Eicher	(United States)	Attack	Right	6 ft 4 in	220 lbs	Army	2025	Episcopal	Warrenton, Virginia	
21	Liam Byrnes	(United States)	Defense	Right	6 ft 3 in	215 lbs	Marquette	2016	West Islip	West Islip, New York	
23	Ty English	(Canada)	Midfield	Left	5 ft 11 in	185 lbs	North Carolina	2026	Culver Academy	Burlington, Ontario	
26	Teddy Malone	(United States)	Attack	R/L	6 ft 0 in	160 lbs	Harvard	2026	Haverford	Wilmington, Delaware	
27	Shane Knobloch	(United States)	Midfield	R/L	5 ft 9 in	200 lbs	Rutgers	2024	Moorestown	Moorestown, New Jersey	
30	Justin Inacio	(Canada)	Faceoff	Right	5 ft 10 in	188 lbs	Ohio State	2022	The Hill Academy	Oakville, Ontario	
32	Peter Detwiler	(United States)	SSDM	Right	6 ft 0 in	200 lbs	Marquette	2026	Conestoga	Devon, Pennsylvania	
38	Greg Langermeier	(United States)	SSDM	Right	6 ft 0 in	195 lbs	Ohio State	2025	St. Ignatius	Westlake, Ohio	
41	Charlie Bertrand	(United States)	Midfield	Left	6 ft 3 in	215 lbs	Virginia	2021	Baldwinsville	Baldwinsville, New York	
45	Richard Checo	(United States)	LSM	Right	5 ft 9 in	185 lbs	Lehigh	2026	St. John's College	Oakton, Virginia	
50	Christian Scarpello	(England)	SSDM	Left	5 ft 11 in	200 lbs	Rutgers	2018	Madison	Madison, New Jersey	
51	JJ Sillstrop	(United States)	Midfield	Left	5 ft 10 in	190 lbs	Denver	2024	La Costa Canyon	Encinitas, California	
73	Nick Rowlett	(United States)	Faceoff	Right	6 ft 0 in	180 lbs	Michigan	2023	Robinson	Burke, Virginia	
77	Owen Hiltz	(Canada)	Attack	Left	5 ft 8 in	186 lbs	Syracuse	2025	Culver Academy	Peterborough, Ontario	
88	Jarrod Neumann (C)	(United States)	Defense	Right	6 ft 4 in	230 lbs	Providence	2017	Bridgton Academy	Northampton, Massachusetts	
99	Jack Rowlett	(United States)	Defense	Right	6 ft 1 in	195 lbs	North Carolina	2019	Robinson	Burke, Virginia	

*Indicates player is on Unavailable to Travel list

**Indicates player is on Physically Unable to Perform list

^Indicates player is on holdout list

(C) indicates captain

=== Coaching staff ===
- Head coach – Steven Brooks
- Assistant coach – PT Ricci
- Assistant coach – Matt Mackrides

== All-time draft selections ==
2019

Rnd.	Pick #	Player	Pos.	College	Conf.	2019 Accolades
1	6	Johnny Surdick	Defense	Army	Patriot League	Schmeisser Award Winner (National Defenseman of the Year), First-Team All-American, Patriot League Defensive Player of the Year, First-Team Patriot League
2	7	Jack Rowlett	Defense	North Carolina	Atlantic Coast Conference	Third-Team All-American, First-Team ACC
3	18	Greyson Torain	Midfield	Navy	Patriot League	First-Team Patriot League
4	19	Austin Henningsen	Faceoff	Maryland	Big Ten Conference	

2020 Entry Draft

The 2020 player entry draft occurred on March 16 for teams to select players arriving from rival Major League Lacrosse. On March 4, Paul Burmeister and NBCSN hosted an entry draft lottery for selection order. Out of 100 balls to select from, Waterdogs had 40, Chrome had 25, Atlas had 15, Archers had 10, Chaos had 6, Redwoods had 3, and the champion Whipsnakes had 1.

Rob Pannell was announced to be transferring to the PLL on March 9, followed by 15 other players the following day, which comprised the selection pool for the entry draft. A total of 14 players were selected in the entry draft with remaining new players entering the league player pool.

Draft results
Rnd.	Pick #	Player	Pos.	College
1	7	Dillon Ward	Goalie	Bellarmine
2	14	Jason Noble	Midfield	Cornell

2020 College Draft

Rnd.	Pick #	Player	Pos.	College	Notes
1	5	Matt Gaudet	Attack	Yale	
2	12	Jeff Teat	Attack	Cornell	Teat would return to Cornell for a fifth season

2021 Entry Draft

Rnd.	Pick #	Player	Pos.	College
1	8	Max Adler	Face-off	Bentley
2	16	Challen Rogers	Midfield	Stony Brook
3	24	Kyle Jackson	Midfield	Michigan

2021 College Draft

Rnd.	Pick #	Player	Pos.	College
1	6	Mac O'Keefe	Attack	Penn State
2	14	Kyle Gallagher	Face-off	Notre Dame
2	15	Tanner Cook	Midfield	North Carolina
3	19	Jared Bernhardt	Attack	Maryland
3	22	Kyle Thornton	Defense	Notre Dame
4	30	Ryan Smith	Attack	Robert Morris

2022 College Draft

Round	Pick	Player	Position	College
1	6	Brett Kennedy	Defense	Syracuse
1	8	Zach Geddes	SSDM	Georgetown
2	16	Jonathan Donville	Attack	Maryland
4	32	Kevin Lindley	Attack	Loyola

2023 College Draft

Round	Pick	Player	Position	College
1	7	Will Bowen	Defense	Georgetown
2	15	Brian Minicus	Attack	Georgetown
3	17	Tye Kurtz	Attack	Delaware
3	23	Nick Rowlett	Faceoff	Michigan
4	31	Levi Anderson	Attack	Saint Joseph's

2024 College Draft

Round	Pick	Player	Position	College
1	4	Shane Knobloch	Midfield	Rutgers
2	12	Eric Dobson	Midfield	Notre Dame
3	20	Ross Scott	Attack	Rutgers
4	28	Dylan Hess	Midfield	Georgetown

2025 College Draft

Round	Pick	Player	Position	College
1	8	Owen Hiltz	Attack	Syracuse
2	13	Levi Verch	Defense	Saint Joseph's
2	16	Jack McDonald	LSM	Maryland

2026 College Draft

Round	Pick	Player	Position	College
1	7	Chad Palumbo	Midfield	Princeton
2	12	Ty English	SSDM	North Carolina
3	22	Eric Spanos	Attack	Maryland
4	28	Peter Detwiler	SSDM	Marquette

== Season results ==
2019
Week	Location	Date	Opponent	Result
1	Boston, Massachusetts	June 2, 2019	Whipsnakes	L 14-15 (OT)
2	New York, New York	June 9, 2019	Atlas	W 18–13
3	Chicago, Illinois	June 15, 2019	Redwoods	W 12–11 (OT)
4	Baltimore, Maryland	June 23, 2019	Archers	W 14–13
5	Atlanta, Georgia	June 29, 2019	Chrome	W 15–14 (OT)
6	Washington, DC	July 7, 2019	Chrome	L 11-19
All-Star Break	Los Angeles, California	July 21, 2019	All-Star Game	N/A
7	Denver, Colorado	July 27, 2019	Whipsnakes	W 13-12
8	San Jose, California	August 10, 2019	Redwoods	W 13–10
9	Hamilton, Ontario	August 17, 2019	Archers	W 11-10 (OT)
10	Albany, New York	August 25, 2019	Atlas	L 9-12
Playoffs Round 1	Columbus, Ohio	September 6–7, 2019	Whipsnakes	L 7-15
Playoffs Round 2	New York, New York	September 14, 2019	Redwoods	L 7-10

2020
Game	Location	Date	Opponent	Result
1	Herriman, Utah	July 25, 2020	Chrome	L 9–13
2	Herriman, Utah	July 29, 2020	Redwoods	L 7–8
3	Herriman, Utah	July 31, 2020	Whipsnakes	L 7–12
4	Herriman, Utah	August 1, 2020	Waterdogs	L 9–10
5 (Elimination)	Herriman, Utah	August 4, 2020	Chrome	W 19–14
6 (Semifinal)	Herriman, Utah	August 6, 2020	Archers	W 13–9
7 (PLL Championship)	Herriman, Utah	August 9, 2020	Whipsnakes	L 6–12

2021
Game	Location	Date	Opponent	Result
1	Foxborough, Massachusetts	June 5, 2021	Whipsnakes	L 7–13
2	Kennesaw, Georgia	June 11, 2021	Waterdogs	L 12–14
3	Kennesaw, Georgia	June 13, 2021	Archers	L 8–12
4	Baltimore, Maryland	June 26, 2021	Redwoods	W 11–9
5	Hempstead, New York	July 3, 2021	Cannons	W 14–10
6	Eagan, Minnesota	July 10, 2021	Atlas	L 10–16
7	Colorado Springs, Colorado	August 1, 2021	Chrome	W 14–12
8	Albany, New York	August 13, 2021	Archers	W 11–9
9	Albany, New York	August 15, 2021	Redwoods	L 9–10
10 (Quarterfinal)	Sandy, Utah	August 20, 2021	Archers	W 13–10
11 (Semifinal)	Chester, Pennsylvania	September 5, 2021	Atlas	W 15–9
11 (Championship)	Washington D.C.	September 19, 2021	Whipsnakes	W 14–9

2022
Game	Location	Date	Opponent	Result
1	Albany, New York	June 4	Whipsnakes	L 8–9
2	Charlotte, North Carolina	June 10	Archers	L 12–17
3	Hempstead, New York	June 18	Redwoods	L 7–11
4	Baltimore, Maryland	June 24	Waterdogs	L 9–18
5	Eagan, Minnesota	July 2	Cannons	W 13–11
6	Fairfield, Connecticut	July 23	Whipsnakes	L 12–14
7	Frisco, Texas	July 31	Redwoods	W 14–12
8	Denver, Colorado	August 6	Chrome	L 9–13
9	Herriman, Utah	August 13	Archers	L 8–11
10	Tacoma, Washington	August 21	Atlas	L 9–10
11 (Quarterfinal)	Foxborough, Massachusetts	September 3	Chrome	W 11–3
12 (Semifinal)	Washington D.C.	September 11	Archers	W 9–7
13 (Championship)	Chester, Pennsylvania	September 18	Waterdogs	L 9–11

2023
Game	Location	Date	Opponent	Result
1	Albany, New York	June 4	Waterdogs	L 7–8 (OT)
2	Charlotte, North Carolina	June 10	Cannons	W 14–13
3	Columbus, Ohio	June 17	Archers	W 15–10
4	Eagan, Minnesota	July 9	Redwoods	L 8–13
5	Fairfield, Connecticut	July 15	Atlas	W 15–11
6	Frisco, Texas	July 30	Whipsnakes	L 16–17
7	Baltimore, Maryland	August 6	Redwoods	W 14–12
8	Denver, Colorado	August 11	Whipsnakes	L 10–12
9	Tacoma, Washington	August 19	Waterdogs	L 8–13
10	Herriman, Utah	August 26	Chrome	W 13–7
11 (Quarterfinal)	Foxborough, Massachusetts	September 4	Redwoods	L 9–15

2024
Game	Location	Date	Opponent	Result
1	Albany, New York	June 2	Outlaws	W 16–11
2	Charlotte, North Carolina	June 7	Redwoods	W 12–11
3	Charlotte, North Carolina	June 8	Atlas	L 12–15
4	Villanova, Pennsylvania	June 15	Archers	L 7–9
5	Eagan, Minnesota	June 29	Waterdogs	L 6–10
6	Fairfield, Connecticut	July 19	Whipsnakes	W 10–9
7	San Diego, California	July 27	Redwoods	L 8–10
8	Baltimore, Maryland	August 4	Archers	W 15–14
9	Denver, Colorado	August 10	Outlaws	L 4–10
10	Herriman, Utah	August 16	Cannons	L 10–11
11 (Quarterfinal)	Foxborough, Massachusetts	September 2	Cannons	W 8–4
12 (Semifinal)	Uniondale, New York	September 7	Archers	L 1–10

2025
Game	Location	Date	Opponent	Result
1	Albany, New York	May 30	Atlas	L 8–10
2	Charlotte, North Carolina	June 6	Outlaws	W 12–9
3	Charlotte, North Carolina	June 7	Redwoods	L 10–16
4	Baltimore, Maryland	June 22	Whipsnakes	L 6–20
5	San Diego, California	June 28	Cannons	W 14–12
6	Evanston, Illinois	July 12	Redwoods	W 12–10
7	Fairfield, Connecticut	July 18	Archers	L 11–12
8	Herriman, Utah	July 26	Waterdogs	W 15–14 (OT)
9	Denver, Colorado	August 1	Outlaws	W 12–11
10	Cambridge, Massachusetts	August 8	Archers	L 10–11
11 (Quarterfinal)	Eagan, Minnesota	August 23	Redwoods	L 12–14

2026 Championship Series
Game	Location	Date	Opponent	Result
1	Springfield, VA	February 28	Atlas	L 24–25
2	Springfield, VA	March 1	Redwoods	L 21–23
3	Springfield, VA	March 5	Outlaws	W 26–18
4 (Semifinals)	Springfield, VA	March 7	Outlaws	W 23–22
5 (Finals)	Springfield, VA	March 8	Redwoods	W 24–16

== PLL Award Winners ==
Jim Brown Most Valuable Player

- Blaze Riorden: 2021

Dave Pietramala Defensive Player of the Year

- Jarrod Neumann: 2019

Oren Lyons Goalie of the Year

- Blaze Riorden: 2019, 2020, 2021, 2023, 2024

Dick Edell Coach of the Year

- Andy Towers: 2019

Brendan Looney Leadership Award

- Blaze Riorden: 2025

Jimmy Regan Teammate of the Year

- Mark Glicini: 2019

== Head coaches ==
#	Name	Term	Regular Season				Playoffs			
#	Name	Term	GP	W	L	Pct	GP	W	L	Pct
1	Andy Towers	2019 - 2024	53	22	31	.415	14	8	6	.571
2	Roy Colsey	2025 -	10	5	5	.500	1	0	1	.000

== All-time record vs. PLL Clubs ==
Opponent	Won	Lost	Percentage	Streak
Archers	8	7	.533	Lost 3
Atlas	3	5	.375	Lost 2
Cannons	5	1	.833	Won 2
Outlaws	8	4	.667	Won 2
Redwoods	7	9	.438	Lost 1
Waterdogs	1	7	.125	Won 1
Whipsnakes	4	10	.286	Lost 1
Totals	36	43	.456	
