= Premier Lacrosse League Championship Series =

Annual winter lacrosse tournament

Championship Series
- Logo of the 2025 PLL Championship Series.
- Sport: Lacrosse Sixes
- First season: 2023
- No. of teams: 4
- Most recent champions: Carolina Chaos (1st title) (2026)
- Most titles: Boston Cannons (2)
- Website: https://premierlacrosseleague.com/championship-series

The PLL Championship Series is an annual winter lacrosse tournament in the lacrosse sixes format. It is hosted by the Premier Lacrosse League. It features the top four teams in the regular season standings of the previous Premier Lacrosse League season. The inaugural championship series occurred in 2023.

Announced in May 2022, the Championship Series was created for a variety of reasons: incentivize a teams regular season finishing position (as of 2023 only the last place team in the standings does not qualify for playoffs in the PLL), provide more playing opportunities for PLL players that do not play in the NLL, aid in the broader push for lacrosse's inclusion in the Olympics, and to create more inventory for the PLL's broadcasting partners.

The four qualifying teams were allowed to roster 12 players, ten field players and two goalkeepers.

== Lacrosse sixes and rule differences ==
The lacrosse sixes format is a version of lacrosse which aims to provide greater access to lacrosse by eliminating barriers of entry. This format is also designed to be more applicable for the modern olympic framework. The Championship Series selected this format as part of its broader push to be included in the 2028 Olympics.

The typical major changes for Lacrosse Sixes are as follows:

- 6 against 6 rather than 9 against 9 (excluding goalkeepers)
- 30 second shot-clock
- 4, 8-minute quarters
- Goalkeepers begin play when a goal is scored, face-offs only occur at the beginning of each quarter
- Field size is 70 by 36 meters
- Everyone plays on both sides of the field
- No long poles are permitted
- No shot back up, a missed shot results in a change of possession all of the time rather than possession being determined by who is closest to the ball when it goes out

For the Championship Series, the PLL also included a 13-yard 2-point arc.

== Results ==
=== 2023 Championship Series ===
The 2023 Championship Series took place from February 22, 2023 to February 26, 2023. The round-robin games took place from February 22, to February 24. The semifinals games took place on February 25, and the finals took place on February 26. The participants were the Whipsnakes, the eventual champion Chrome, the Archers, and the eventual runner-up Atlas

==== Round Robin ====
	2023 Championship Series Round Robin	Whipsnakes	Chrome	Archers	Atlas	
1	Whipsnakes		14-18	23-26	16-29	0-3
2	Chrome	18-14		22-23 (OT)	20-29	1-2
3	Archers	26-23	23-22 (OT)		26-31	2-1
4	Atlas	29-16	29-20	31-26		3-0

Round-robin teams are listed in their 2022 PLL regular season standings order.

==== Bracket ====
Semifinals; February 25
1	Atlas	30
4	Whipsnakes	21
3	Chrome	21
2	Archers	18

Finals; February 26
1	Atlas	23
3	Chrome	24

==== Finals ====
Winning team	Runner-up	Score	Venue	Winners Purse	Ref.
Chrome LC	Atlas LC	24-23	The St. James (Springfield, VA)	$120,000	

=== 2024 Championship Series ===
The 2024 Championship Series featured the top 4 regular season finishers of the 2023 Premier Lacrosse League season; including the 2023 PLL Champion Utah Archers. The other competing teams were the eventual champion Boston Cannons, Philadelphia Waterdogs, and California Redwoods. It took place from February 14-19, 2023 at The St. James in Springfield, VA. Round robin play was from February 14-17, 2024, the semifinals were on February 18, and the finals were on February 19.

==== Round Robin ====
	2024 Championship Series Round Robin	Archers	Cannons	Waterdogs	Redwoods	
1	Archers		19-26	18-21	16-18	0-3
2	Cannons	26-19		12-22	25-26	1-2
3	Waterdogs	21-18	22-22		20-14	3-0
4	Redwoods	18-16	26-25	14-20		2-1

Round-robin teams are listed in their 2023 PLL regular season standings order.

==== Bracket ====
Semifinals; February 18
1	Waterdogs	27
4	Archers	21
3	Cannons	23
2	Redwoods	15

Finals; February 19
1	Waterdogs	22
3	Cannons	23

==== Finals ====
Winning team	Losing team	Score	Venue	Ref.
Boston Cannons	Philadelphia Waterdogs	23-22 (OT)	The St. James (Springfield, VA)	

==== Notable Statistics ====
The 2024 Championship Series final saw a 24% increase in average viewership on ESPN2 and a 42% increase in viewership on ESPN+. There was a 32% increase in attendance with a 46% increase in total ticket revenue.

=== 2025 Championship Series ===
The 2025 PLL Championship Series (sponsor name Lexus PLL Championship Series), took place on February 11 - 17, 2025 at The St. James in Springfield, Virginia – marketed as Washington, D.C.. The top four PLL teams from the 2024 regular season – New York Atlas, Boston Cannons, Maryland Whipsnakes and the 2024 PLL Champion Utah Archers competed in a round-robin, six-on-six tournament inspired by the Lacrosse Sixes game that will be played at the 2028 Summer Olympics. Round-robin play started on Tuesday, February 11 and continued through Saturday, Feb. 15, with PLL semifinal occurring Sunday, Feb. 16 and championship game on Monday, Feb. 17.

==== Round Robin ====
Pos	Team	W	L	GF	GA	GD	Qualification
1	New York Atlas	1	2	60	59	+1	Advance to semifinal
2	Boston Cannons	2	1	78	65	+13	Advance to semifinal
3	Maryland Whipsnakes	0	3	59	88	−29	
4	Utah Archers	3	0	81	66	+15	Advance to final

Source: Standings

Round-robin teams are listed in their 2024 PLL regular season standings order.

Feb 11, 8:00pm	Maryland Whipsnakes	13—25	New York Atlas	Stats
Feb 12, 6:00pm	Boston Cannons	21—29	Utah Archers	Stats
Feb 13, 6:00pm	Maryland Whipsnakes	21—34	Boston Cannons	Stats
Feb 14, 7:00pm	New York Atlas	20—23	Utah Archers	Stats
Feb 15, 5:00pm	New York Atlas	15—23	Boston Cannons	Stats
Feb 15, 7:00pm	Maryland Whipsnakes	25—29	Utah Archers	Stats

All times in Eastern Time (ET)

==== Playoffs ====
Semifinals; February 16
Cannons	24
Atlas	23

Finals; February 17
Archers	14
Cannons	21

Feb 16, 5:00pm	New York Atlas	23—24 (OT)	Boston Cannons	Stats
Feb 17, 12:30pm	Boston Cannons	21—14	Utah Archers	Stats

All times in Eastern Time (ET)

=== Rosters ===
==== California Redwoods ====
#	Name	Nationality	Height	Weight	College	Grad year	High School	Hometown	Ref.
2	Andrew McAdorey	(United States)	5 ft 8 in	190 lbs	Duke	2025	St. Anthony's	Manorville, New York	
3	Carter Rice	(United States)	5 ft 11 in	191 lbs	Syracuse	2025	Boston College High School	Milton, Massachusetts	
4	Dylan Molloy	(United States)	6 ft 0 in	215 lbs	Brown	2017	St. Anthony's	Setauket, New York	
5	Romar Dennis	(United States)	6 ft 5 in	225 lbs	Loyola	2017	St. Mary's Ryken	Huntingtown, Maryland	
12	Brian Tevlin	(United States)	5 ft 11 in	190 lbs	Notre Dame	2023	Seton Hall Prep	Livingston, New Jersey	
23	Chris Merle	(United States)	6 ft 1 in	200 lbs	Virginia	2021	Westhampton Beach	Westhampton Beach, New York	
34	Josh Balcarcel	(Puerto Rico)	5 ft 7 in	175 lbs	Marist	2025	Delaware Valley	Milford, Pennsylvania	
42	Zach Vigue	(United States)	6 ft 0 in	220 lbs	Richmond	2025	Apex	Apex, North Carolina	
43	Matt Knote	(United States)	5 ft 10 in	220 lbs	UMass	2024	Eastport-South Manor	Speonk, New York	
70	BJ Farrare	(United States)	5 ft 8 in	175 lbs	Penn	2023	McDonogh	Owings Mills, Maryland	
81	Connor Cmiel	(United States)	6 ft 2 in	195 lbs	Ohio State	2025	St. Ignatius	Rocky River, Ohio	
88	Aidan Danenza	(United States)	6 ft 3 in	220 lbs	Duke	2024	St. Anthony's	Muttontown, New York	
91	Michael Boehm	(United States)	5 ft 10 in	170 lbs	Michigan	2024	St. Ignatius	Rocky River, Ohio	

==== Carolina Chaos ====
#	Name	Nationality	Height	Weight	College	Grad year	High School	Hometown	Ref.
3	Chris Aslanian	(United States)	6 ft 3 in	205 lbs	Hobart	2019	Hun	Westfield, New Jersey	
4	Cole Williams	(United States)	6 ft 5 in	220 lbs	Johns Hopkins	2021	Loyola	Marriottsville, Maryland	
9	Ray Dearth	(United States)	6 ft 2 in	205 lbs	Harvard	2025	Ridgefield	Ridgefield, Connecticut	
14	Austin Kaut	(United States)	6 ft 1 in	225 lbs	Penn State	2014	Springfield-Delco	Morton, Pennsylvania	
15	Ross Scott	(United States)	5 ft 9 in	175 lbs	Rutgers	2024	West Linn	West Linn, Oregon	
16	Mark Glicini	(United States)	6 ft 1 in	200 lbs	Yale	2016	Mahwah	Mahwah, New Jersey	
19	Jackson Eicher	(United States)	6 ft 4 in	220 lbs	Army	2025	Episcopal	Warrenton, Virginia	
20	Brendan Nichtern	(United States)	6 ft 0 in	185 lbs	Army	2022	Massapequa	Massapequa, New York	
27	Shane Knobloch	(United States)	5 ft 9 in	200 lbs	Rutgers	2024	Moorestown	Moorestown, New Jersey	
30	Sergio Perkovic	(United States)	6 ft 4 in	225 lbs	Notre Dame	2017	Brother Rice	Bloomfield Hills, Michigan	
41	Charlie Bertrand	(United States)	6 ft 3 in	215	Virginia	2021	Baldwinsville	Baldwinsville, New York	
45	JC Higginbotham	(United States)	6 ft 0 in	200 lbs	Bellarmine	2024	Plano West	Plano, Texas	
50	Christian Scarpello	(England)	5 ft 11 in	200 lbs	Rutgers	2018	Madison	Madison, New Jersey	

==== Denver Outlaws ====
#	Name	Nationality	Height	Weight	College	Grad year	High School	Hometown	Ref.
0	Graham Bundy Jr.	(United States)	6 ft 1 in	200 lbs	Georgetown	2024	MICDS	St. Louis, Missouri	
2	Fulton Bayman	(United States)	5 ft 10 in	175 lbs	Georgetown	2025	Lovett School	Atlanta, Georgia	
5	Lance Madonna	(United States)	5 ft 11 in	165 lbs	Richmond	2024	East Syracuse-Minoa	East Syracuse, New York	
9	Jack VanOverbeke	(United States)	6 ft 1 in	185 lbs	High Point	2024	Benilde-St. Margaret's	St. Paul, Minnesota	
13	Zach Geddes	(United States)	6 ft 1 in	190 lbs	Georgetown	2022	Belmont Hill	Winchester, Massachusetts	
20	Jack Gray	(United States)	6 ft 1 in	200 lbs	Duke	2025	Culver	San Rafael, California	
21	Justin Anderson	(United States)	6 ft 0 in	190 lbs	North Carolina	2021	Centennial	Las Vegas, Nevada	
24	Owen McElroy	(United States)	6 ft 1 in	190 lbs	Georgetown	2022	Avon Old Farms	Ridgewood, New Jersey	
30	Logan McNaney	(United States)	5 ft 10 in	185 lbs	Maryland	2025	Salisbury	Corning, New York	
40	Dylan Gergar	(United States)	5 ft 11 in	200 lbs	Penn	2023	Severn	Annapolis, Maryland	
57	Greg Weyl	(United States)	6 ft 2 in	210 lbs	Mercyhurst	2018	Pittsford	Pittsford, New York	
59	Mikie Schlosser	(United States)	6 ft 2 in	190 lbs	Michigan	2017	Davis	Davis, California	
91	Ryan Cohen	(United States)	5 ft 9 in	183 lbs	Michigan	2025	Avon Old Farms	Boca Raton, Florida	

==== New York Atlas ====
#	Name	Nationality	Height	Weight	College	Grad year	High School	Hometown	Ref.
0	Eric Malever	(United States)	6 ft 1 in	190 lbs	Duke	2025	Woodward Academy	Atlanta, Georgia	
2	Matt Traynor	(United States)	6 ft 2 in	193 lbs	Penn State	2025	Malvern Prep	Downingtown, Pennsylvania	
5	Tyler Carpenter	(United States)	5 ft 10 in	180 lbs	Duke	2024	Salisbury	Durham, North Carolina	
8	Myles Jones	(United States)	6 ft 5 in	250 lbs	Duke	2016	Walt Whitman	Huntington, New York	
15	Jack Koras	(United States)	5 ft 11 in	185 lbs	Maryland	2024	Loyola Blakefield	Lutherville, Maryland	
22	Michael Rexrode	(United States)	6 ft 0 in	215 lbs	Rutgers	2018	Loudoun County	Leesburg, Virginia	
25	Christopher Davis	(United States)	6 ft 3 in	215 lbs	Cornell	2025	Essex	Essex Junction, Vermont	
26	Bryan Costabile	(United States)	6 ft 2 in	215 lbs	Notre Dame	2020	Mount St. Joseph	Sykesville, Maryland	
30	Brian Phipps	(United States)	5 ft 9 in	180 lbs	Maryland	2010	Severn	Annapolis, Maryland	
47	Kyle Jackson	(Haudenosaunee)	5 ft 9 in	163 lbs	Michigan	2016	The Hill Academy	Sarnia, Ontario	
48	Max Krevsky	(Israel)	6 ft 2 in	200 lbs	Yale	2025	Cumberland Valley	Harrisburg, Pennsylvania	
57	Chet Comizio	(United States)	5 ft 10 in	185 lbs	Villanova	2023	Delbarton	Basking Ridge, New Jersey	
88	Will Mark	(Puerto Rico)	6 ft 4 in	200 lbs	Syracuse	2024	Proctor Academy	Danville, California	

==== Round Robin ====
Pos	Team	W	L	GF	GA	GD	Qualification
1	New York Atlas	1	2	69	79	−10	
2	Denver Outlaws	1	2	64	74	−10	Advance to semifinal
3	California Redwoods	3	0	72	57	+15	Advance to final
4	Carolina Chaos	1	2	71	66	+5	Advance to semifinal

Source: Standings

Round-robin teams are listed in their 2025 PLL regular season standings order.

Feb 27, 7:00pm	New York Atlas	22 - 32	Denver Outlaws	Stats
Feb 28, 5:30pm	Denver Outlaws	14 - 26	California Redwoods	Stats
Feb 28, 7:30pm	Carolina Chaos	24 - 25	New York Atlas	Stats
Mar 1, 11:30pm	California Redwoods	23 - 21	Carolina Chaos	Stats
Mar 5, 5:00pm	Carolina Chaos	26-18	Denver Outlaws	Stats
Mar 6, 7:00pm	New York Atlas	22-23	California Redwoods	Stats

All times in Eastern Time (ET)

==== Playoffs ====
Semifinals; March 7
Chaos	23
Outlaws	22

Finals; March 8
Chaos	24
Redwoods	16

Mar 7, 5:30pm	Denver Outlaws	23—22	Carolina Chaos	Stats
Mar 8, 1:00pm	Carolina Chaos	24—16	California Redwoods]	Stats

All times in Eastern Time (ET)

== Golden Stick Award ==
The Golden Stick Award is given to the player that had the most points during the Championship Series.

Year	Player	Team	Points (Scoring Points, Assists)	Ref.
2023	Romar Dennis	Atlas LC	38 (34 SP, 4 A)	
2024	Kieran McArdle	Philadelphia Waterdogs	38 (26 SP, 12 A)	
2025	Matt Campbell	Boston Cannons	35 (23 SP, 12 A)	
2026	Shane Knobloch	Carolina Chaos	34 (30 SP, 4 A)	

== All-Tournament Team ==
Year	Goalie	Midfielder	Attacker
2025	Colin Kirst (Cannons)	Mason Woodward (Archers); Beau Pederson (Archers)	Asher Nolthing (Cannons); Myles Jones (Atlas); Matt Campbell (Cannons)
2026	Austin Kaut (Chaos)	Brian Tevlin (Redwoods); Matt Traynor (Atlas)	Charlie Bertrand (Chaos); Andrew McAdorey (Redwoods); Shane Knobloch (Chaos)
