= Denver Outlaws =

U.S. professional field lacrosse team

- Sport: Field lacrosse
- First season: 2019
- League: Premier Lacrosse League
- Team history: Chrome Lacrosse Club; 2019–2023; Denver Outlaws; 2023–present
- Based in: Denver, Colorado
- Stadium: Peter Barton Lacrosse Stadium
- Colors: Black, orange, silver
- Owner: Mike and Paul Rabil
- Head coach: Tim Soudan
- Championships: 0
- Conference titles: 0
- Championship Series Titles: 1 (2023)
- Website: Denver Outlaws

The Denver Outlaws are a professional field lacrosse team based in Denver, Colorado, that competes in the Premier Lacrosse League (PLL). Founded as the Chrome Lacrosse Club, they began play as one of the league's six inaugural teams in the 2019 season alongside Archers, Atlas, Chaos, Redwoods, and Whipsnakes. The team competes as a member of the league's Western Conference.

Following the assignment of home markets for the 2024 season on November 14, 2023, they were rebranded with the identity of the former Denver Outlaws of Major League Lacrosse. The Denver Outlaws notched their first PLL win defeating the defending champion Utah Archers 18–17 in overtime on June 7, 2024, in Charlotte, North Carolina.

== Roster ==
2025 Denver Outlaws
#	Name	Nationality	Position	Shot	Height	Weight	College	Grad year	High school	Hometown	Ref.
0	Graham Bundy Jr.	(United States)	Midfield	Right	6 ft 1 in	200 lbs	Georgetown	2024	MICDS	St. Louis, Missouri	
1	JT Giles-Harris	(United States)	Defense	Right	5 ft 10 in	205 lbs	Duke	2021	St. Joseph's Regional	Nyack, New York	
3	Jonathan Donville	(Canada)	Midfield	Right	6 ft 0 in	205 lbs	Maryland	2022	Deerfield Academy	Oakville, Ontario	
4	Evan Plunkett	(United States)	Midfield	R/L	5 ft 10 in	185 lbs	Army	2026	Roswell	Roswell, Georgia	
8	Nick Grill	(United States)	LSM	Right	5 ft 8 in	190 lbs	Maryland	2021	Bridgewater-Raritan	Bridgewater, New Jersey	
10	Jared Bernhardt	(United States)	Attack	R/L	6 ft 1 in	195 lbs	Maryland	2021	Lake Brantley	Longwood, Florida	
11	Dalton Young	(United States)	Midfield	Right	6 ft 0 in	205 lbs	Richmond	2024	John Champe	Chantilly, Virginia	
12	Logan Wisnauskas	(United States)	Attack	Left	6 ft 3 in	210 lbs	Maryland	2022	Boys' Latin	Sykesville, Maryland	
13	Zach Geddes	(United States)	SSDM	Right	6 ft 1 in	190 lbs	Georgetown	2022	Belmont Hill	Winchester, Massachusetts	
16	Kevin Parnham	(United States)	Defense	Left	6 ft 2 in	205 lbs	Penn State	2025	Pingry	Tewksbury, New Jersey	
21	Justin Anderson (C)	(United States)	Midfield	R/L	6 ft 0 in	190 lbs	North Carolina	2021	Centennial	Las Vegas, Nevada	
24	Owen McElroy	(United States)	Goalie	Right	6 ft 1 in	190 lbs	Georgetown	2022	Avon Old Farms	Ridgewood, New Jersey	
30	Logan McNaney	(United States)	Goalie	Left	5 ft 10 in	185 lbs	Maryland	2025	Salisbury	Corning, New York	
31	Jake Taylor	(United States)	Attack	Right	6 ft 0 in	215 lbs	Notre Dame	2025	Regis Jesuit	Denver, Colorado	
34	Ryan Terefenko (C)	(United States)	SSDM	Right	6 ft 0 in	190 lbs	Ohio State	2021	Wilson	Sinking Spring, Pennsylvania	
37	Michael Manley (C)	(United States)	Defense	Right	6 ft 2 in	220 lbs	Duke	2012	Penn Yan Academy	Penn Yan, New York	
39	Alexander Smith	(United States)	SSDM	Right	6 ft 2 in	195 lbs	Maryland	2022	St. Andrew's	Bethesda, Maryland	
42	Brennan O'Neill	(United States)	Attack	Left	6 ft 3 in	240 lbs	Duke	2024	St. Anthony's	Bay Shore, New York	
44	Jack Gray	(United States)	SSDM	Right	6 ft 1 in	200 lbs	Duke	2025	Culver Academy	San Rafael, California	
48	John Dunphey	(United States)	Midfield	Left	6 ft 0 in	185 lbs	Princeton	2026	Ridgewood	Ridgewood, New Jersey	
51	Pat Kavanagh	(United States)	Attack	Right	5 ft 10 in	175 lbs	Notre Dame	2024	Chaminade	Rockville Centre, New York	
52	Luke Wierman	(United States)	Faceoff	Right	6 ft 2 in	211 lbs	Maryland	2024	B. Reed Henderson	West Chester, Pennsylvania	
57	Greg Weyl	(United States)	LSM	Left	6 ft 2 in	210 lbs	Mercyhurst	2018	Pittsford	Pittsford, New York	
77	Ben Randall	(United States)	Defense	Right	6 ft 3 in	215 lbs	Ohio State	2018	Mason	Mason, Ohio	
88	Jake Piseno	(Haudenosaunee)	LSM	Right	5 ft 8 in	190 lbs	Albany	2024	Liverpool	Liverpool, New York	
	Nolan Byrne	(Canada)	Midfield	Left	6 ft 3 in	190 lbs	Lafayette	2024	Western Reserve Academy	Greely, Ontario	

(C) indicates captain

=== Head coaches ===
Coach	Seasons	Record	Pct
Dom Starsia	2019	2–8	.200
Tim Soudan	2020–present	26–33	.441

=== Draft picks ===
Draft	R	P	Player	Position	College
Chrome Lacrosse Club
2019	1	3	Zach Goodrich	Midfield	Towson
2019	2	10	Chris Sabia	Defense	Penn State
2019	3	15	Max Tuttle	Midfield	Sacred Heart
2019	4	22	Connor Farrell	Faceoff	Long Island Post
2020 (E) (Note: Entry Draft for players arriving from the Major League Lacrosse.)	1	2	Jesse Bernhardt	Long Stick Midfield	Maryland
2020 (E)	2	9	Donny Moss	Defense	Adelphi
2020	1	4	Tom Rigney	Defense	Army
2020	2	9	Reece Eddy	Defense	Boston
2021 (E)	1	5	Randy Staats	Attack	Syracuse
2021 (E)	2	13	Sean Sconone	Goalie	UMass
2021 (E)	3	21	Colin Heacock	Attack	Maryland
2021	1	3	JT Giles-Harris	Defence	Duke
2021	2	12	Ryan Terefenko	Midfield	Ohio State
2021	3	20	Justin Anderson	Midfield	North Carolina
2021	4	28	Jackson Morrill	Attack	Denver
2022	1	1	Logan Wisnauskas	Attack	Maryland
2022	2	9	Brendan Nichtern	Attack	Army
2022	3	17	Ryan McNulty	Defense	Loyola
2022	4	25	Owen McElroy	Goalie	Georgetown
2023	1	4	Sam Handley	Midfield	Penn
2023	2	12	Troy Hettinger	Long Stick Midfield	Jacksonville
2023	3	20	Jack Myers	Attack	Ohio State
2023	4	28	Cross Ferrara	Attack	Salisbury
Denver Outlaws
2024	1	1	Brennan O'Neill	Attack	Duke
2024	2	9	Jake Piseno	Long Stick Midfield	Albany
2024	2	11	Graham Bundy Jr.	Midfield	Georgetown
2024	3	19	Josh Zawada	Attack	Duke
2024	4	25	Luke Wierman	Faceoff	Maryland
2025	2	11	Logan McNaney	Goalie	Maryland
2025	3	19	Pace Billings	Defense	Michigan
2025	4	26	Kevin Parnham	Defense	Penn State
2025	4	27	Jack Gray	Defensive Midfield	Duke
2026	1	4	Evan Plunkett	Midfield	Army
2026	4	31	Jack Taylor	Midfield	Jacksonville

== Honors ==
=== Team ===
- Premier Lacrosse League
  - Winners (0)
- Premier Lacrosse League Championship Series
  - Winners (1): 2023

=== Individual ===
- Coach of the Year
  - Tim Soudan, 2022, 2025
- Defensive Player of the Year
  - JT Giles-Harris, 2022
- Goalie of the Year
  - Logan McNaney, 2025
- Long-stick Midfielder of the Year
  - Jake Piseno, 2025
- Hard Hat Award
  - Ryan Terefenko, 2025
- Leadership Award
  - Jordan MacIntosh, 2022
  - Mike Manley, 2026
- Rookie of the Year
  - Brendan Nichtern, 2022
- Dave Huntley Sportsmanship Award
  - Connor Farrell, 2019
  - JT Giles-Harris, 2024

== Competitive record ==
Premier Lacrosse League
Year	W	L	Pct	Regular season finish	Playoffs
Chrome Lacrosse Club
2019	2	8	.200	6th in League	Did Not Qualify
2020	3	2	.600	2nd in League	Lost elimination round vs. Chaos 14–19
2021	2	7	.222	8th in League	Did Not Qualify
2022	7	3	.700	2nd in League	Lost quarter-final vs. Chaos 3–11
2023	1	9	.100	8th in League	Did Not Qualify
All-time	15	31	.326		0–2 (.000)
Denver Outlaws
2024	5	5	.500	2nd in West	Lost quarter-final vs. Maryland Whipsnakes 10–11
2025	7	3	.700	1st in West	Won Semifinal vs. California Redwoods 12–7; Lost Championship vs. New York Atlas 13–14
2026	6	6	.500	3rd in West	Won Quarterfinal vs. California Redwoods 15–14; Won Semifinal vs. Utah Archers 11–5; Lost Championship vs. Philadelphia Waterdogs 4–14
All-time	18	14	.563		3–3 .500
Franchise Total	34	47	.420		3–5 .375

Premier Lacrosse League Championship Series
Year	W	L	Pct	Pos	Playoffs
Chrome Lacrosse Club
2023	1	2	.333	3rd	Won semi-final vs. Archers, 21–18; Won final vs. Atlas, 23–24
All-time	1	2	.333		2–0 (1.000)
Denver Outlaws
2024	Did Not Qualify				
2025	Did Not Qualify				
All-time	0	0	–		
Franchise Total	1	2	.333		2–0 (1.000)
