= List of Premier Lacrosse League awards =

Premier Lacrosse League (PLL) is an American professional field lacrosse league. The league's inaugural season debuted on June 1, 2019, and included a 14-week tour-based schedule taking place in 12 major-market cities.

The PLL gave out 14 awards prior to its first championship in Philadelphia, Pennsylvania, on June 29, 2019.

== Active Awards ==
=== Jim Brown Most Valuable Player ===
Year	Player	Team	Position	Win #	Ref.
2019	Matt Rambo	Whipsnakes LC	Attack	1	
2020	Zed Williams	Whipsnakes LC	Attack	1	
2021	Blaze Riorden	Chaos LC	Goalie	1	
2022	Trevor Baptiste	Atlas LC	Faceoff	1	
2023	Tom Schreiber	Archers LC	Midfield	1	
2024	Jeff Teat	New York Atlas	Attack	1	
2025	Connor Shellenberger	New York Atlas	Attack	1	
2026	CJ Kirst	Philadelphia Waterdogs	Attack	1	

=== Eamon McEneaney Attackman of the Year ===
Year	Player	Team	Win #
2019	Matt Rambo	Whipsnakes LC	1
2020	Zed Williams	Whipsnakes LC	1
2021	Grant Ament	Archers LC	1
2022	Lyle Thompson	Cannons LC	1
2023	Marcus Holman	Cannons LC	1
2024	Jeff Teat	New York Atlas	1
2025	Connor Shellenberger	New York Atlas	1
2026	Michael Sowers	Philadelphia Waterdogs	1

=== Gait Brothers Midfielder of the Year ===
Year	Player	Team	Win #
2019	Tom Schreiber	Archers LC	1
2020	Tom Schreiber	Archers LC	2
2021	Zach Currier	Waterdogs LC	1
2022	Tom Schreiber	Archers LC	3
2023	Tom Schreiber	Archers LC	4
2024	Tom Schreiber	Utah Archers	5
2025	Matt Campbell	Boston Cannons	1
2026	Zack Currier	Philadelphia Waterdogs	2

=== Dave Pietramala Defensive Player of the Year ===
Year	Player	Team	Win #
2019	Jarrod Neumann	Chaos LC	1
2020	Matt Dunn	Whipsnakes LC	1
2021	Graeme Hossack	Archers LC	1
2022	JT Giles-Harris	Chrome LC	1
2023	Garrett Epple	Redwoods LC	1
2024	Matt Dunn	Maryland Whipsnakes	2
2025	Gavin Adler	New York Atlas	1
2026	Brendan Lavelle	Utah Archers	1

=== Brodie Merrill Long Stick Midfielder of the Year ===
Year	Player	Team	Win #
2019	Michael Ehrhardt	Whipsnakes LC	1
2020	Michael Ehrhardt	Whipsnakes LC	2
2021	Michael Ehrhardt	Whipsnakes LC	3
2022	Michael Ehrhardt	Whipsnakes LC	4
2023	Michael Ehrhardt	Whipsnakes LC	5
2024	Tyler Carpenter	New York Atlas	1
2025	Jake Piseno	Denver Outlaws	1
2026	Ethan Rall	Boston Cannons	1

=== Paul Cantabene Faceoff Athlete of the Year ===
Year	Player	Team	Win #
2019	Trevor Baptiste	Atlas LC	1
2020	Joe Nardella	Whipsnakes LC	1
2021	Trevor Baptiste	Atlas LC	2
2022	Trevor Baptiste	Atlas LC	3
2023	Trevor Baptiste	Atlas LC	4
2024	Trevor Baptiste	New York Atlas	5
2025	TD Ierlan	California Redwoods	1
2026	Andrew McMeekin	Boston Cannons	1

=== George Boiardi Short Stick Defensive Midfielder of the Year ===
Year	Player	Team	Win #
2019	Dominique Alexander	Archers LC	1
2020	Tyler Warner	Whipsnakes LC	1
2021	Danny Logan	Atlas LC	1
2022	Danny Logan	Atlas LC	2
2023	Latrell Harris	Archers LC	1
2024	Danny Logan	New York Atlas	3
2025	Ryan Terefenko	Denver Outlaws	1
2026	Brian Tevlin	California Redwoods	1

=== Oren Lyons Goalie of the Year ===
Year	Player	Team	Win #
2019	Blaze Riorden	Chaos LC	1
2020	Blaze Riorden	Chaos LC	2
2021	Blaze Riorden	Chaos LC	3
2022	Kyle Bernlohr	Whipsnakes LC	1
2023	Blaze Riorden	Chaos LC	4
2024	Blaze Riorden	Carolina Chaos	5
2025	Logan McNaney	Denver Outlaws	1
2026	Brett Dobson	Utah Archers	1

=== Rookie of the Year ===
Year	Player	Team	Position
2019	Tim Troutner	Redwoods LC	Goalie
2021	Jeff Teat	Atlas LC	Attack
2022	Brendan Nichtern	Chrome LC	Attack
2023	Tucker Dordevic	Whipsnakes LC	Midfield
2024	TJ Malone	Maryland Whipsnakes	Attack
2025	Chris Kavanagh	California Redwoods	Attack
2026	Joey Spallina	Maryland Whipsnakes	Attack

=== Dick Edell Coach of the Year ===
Year	Coach	Team	Win #
2019	Andy Towers	Chaos LC	1
2021	Andy Copelan	Waterdogs LC	1
2022	Tim Soudan	Chrome LC	1
2023	Brian Holman	Cannons LC	1
2024	Mike Pressler	New York Atlas	1
2025	Tim Soudan	Denver Outlaws	2
2026	Bill Tierney	Philadelphia Waterdogs	1

=== Jimmy Regan Teammate of the Year ===
Year	Player	Team	Position
2019	Mark Glicini	Chaos LC	Midfield
2021	Jack Kelly	Redwoods LC	Goalie
2022	Brodie Merrill	Cannons LC	Defense
2023	Cole Kirst	Redwoods LC	Midfield
2024	Ryan Ambler	Utah Archers	Midfield
2025	Brian Tevlin	California Redwoods	Midfield
2026	Connor Kirst	Boston Cannons	Midfield

=== Brendan Looney Leadership Award ===
Year	Player	Team	Position	Win #
2019	Kyle Harrison	Redwoods LC	Midfield	1
2021	Kyle Harrison	Redwoods LC	Midfield	2
2022	Jordan MacIntosh	Chrome LC	Midfield	1
2023	Tom Schreiber	Archers LC	Midfield	1
2024	Tom Schreiber	Utah Archers	Midfield	2
2025	Blaze Riorden	Carolina Chaos	Goalie	1
2026	Mike Manley	Denver Outlaws	Defense	1

=== Dave Huntley Sportsmanship Award ===
Year	Player	Team	Position	Win #
2019	Connor Farrell	Chrome LC	Faceoff	1
2021	Eric Law	Atlas LC	Attack	1
2022	Eric Law	Atlas LC	Attack	2
2023	Zed Williams	Whipsnakes LC	Attack	1
2024	JT Giles-Harris	Denver Outlaws	Defense	1
2025	Joe Nardella	Maryland Whipsnakes	Faceoff	1
2026	Trevor Baptiste	New York Atlas	Faceoff	1

=== Welles Crowther Humanitarian Award ===
Year	Player	Team	Position	Win #
2019	Scott Ratliff	Archers LC	Long-stick midfield	1
2021	Lyle Thompson	Cannons LC	Attack	1
2022	Lyle Thompson	Cannons LC	Attack	2
2023	Eric Law	Atlas LC	Attack	1
2024	Romar Dennis	California Redwoods	Midfield	1
2025	Romar Dennis	California Redwoods	Midfield	2
2026	Mason Woodward	Utah Archers	Defense	1
