= 2026 Premier Lacrosse League season =

Eighth season of the Premier Lacrosse League

- League: Premier Lacrosse League
- Sport: Field Lacrosse
- Defending champions: New York Atlas (2025)
- Duration: May 8 – September 20
- Teams: 8

Draft
- Top draft pick: Aidan Maguire
- Picked by: Utah Archers

Regular season
- Season MVP: CJ Kirst (Philadelphia Waterdogs)
- Top scorer: Michael Sowers (Philadelphia Waterdogs)

Playoffs
- Finals champions: Philadelphia Waterdogs
- Runners-up: Denver Outlaws
- Finals MVP: CJ Kirst (Philadelphia Waterdogs)

PLL seasons
- ← 2025 2027 →

The 2026 Premier Lacrosse League season will be the 8th season of the Premier Lacrosse League (PLL). The regular season began on May 8 and ran through August 16. The playoffs ran from August 29 through September 20.

The Philadelphia Waterdogs defeated the Denver Outlaws 14–4 in the championship game to win their second PLL title.

== Player movements ==
=== Retirements ===
- Jesse Bernhardt (Bayhawks, Chrome-Outlaws)
  - 2x MLL Champion (2013, 2019), 4x All-Star

=== Trades ===
Outlaws → Redwoods. On June 3, 2026, the Outlaws traded Ryan Croddick to the Redwoods for a 1st round pick in the 2027 PLL College Draft.

=== College Draft ===
The college draft took place on April 14 at 7 pm (ET) and was broadcast on ESPN+.

Rnd.	Pick #	PLL Team	Player	Pos.	College	Conference	Notes
1	1	Utah Archers	Aidan Maguire	SSDM	Duke	Atlantic Coast Conference	
1	2	Boston Cannons	Mikey Weisshaar	Midfield	Towson	Coastal Athletic Association	
1	3	Maryland Whipsnakes	Joey Spallina	Attack	Syracuse	Atlantic Coast Conference	
1	4	Denver Outlaws	Evan Plunkett	Midfield	Army	Patriot League	From Carolina
1	5	Philadelphia Waterdogs	Silas Richmond	Attack	Albany	America East Conference	
1	6	California Redwoods	Michael Leo	Midfield	Syracuse	Atlantic Coast Conference	
1	7	Carolina Chaos	Chad Palumbo	Midfield	Princeton	Ivy League	From Denver
1	8	New York Atlas	Alex Ross	Defense	Penn	Ivy League	
2	9	Utah Archers	Ryan Stines	Attack	Utah	Atlantic Sun Conference	
2	10	Boston Cannons	Hunter Smith	Defense	Richmond	Atlantic 10 Conference	
2	11	Maryland Whipsnakes	Billy Dwan	Defense	Syracuse	Atlantic Coast Conference	
2	12	Carolina Chaos	Ty English	SSDM	North Carolina	Atlantic Coast Conference	
2	13	Philadelphia Waterdogs	Matt Collison	Midfield	Johns Hopkins	Big Ten Conference	
2	14	California Redwoods	Cullen Brown	LSM	Ohio State	Big Ten Conference	
2	15	Boston Cannons	Will Donovan	LSM	Notre Dame	Atlantic Coast Conference	From Denver
2	16	New York Atlas	Luke Rhoa	Midfield	Syracuse	Atlantic Coast Conference	
3	17	Utah Archers	Will Schaller	Defense	Maryland	Big Ten Conference	
3	18	Boston Cannons	Logan Ip	Midfield	Harvard	Ivy League	
3	19	Maryland Whipsnakes	Blake Eiland	SSDM	Ohio State	Big Ten Conference	
3	20	Boston Cannons	Jack Regnery	Midfield	Tufts	New England Small College Athletic Conference	From Carolina
3	21	Philadelphia Waterdogs	Josh Yago	Attack	Notre Dame	Atlantic Coast Conference	
3	22	Carolina Chaos	Eric Spanos	Attack	Maryland	Big Ten Conference	From Denver via California
3	23	Philadelphia Waterdogs	Brendan Staub	LSM	Cornell	Ivy League	From Denver
3	24	New York Atlas	Nikko DiPonio	Defense	Utah	Atlantic Sun Conference	
4	25	Utah Archers	Leo Johnson	Attack	Maryland	Big Ten Conference	
4	26	California Redwoods	Marcus Wertheim	Midfield	Brown	Ivy League	From Boston
4	27	Maryland Whipsnakes	Eric Kolar	SSDM	Maryland	Big Ten Conference	
4	28	Carolina Chaos	Peter Detwiler	SSDM	Marquette	Big East Conference	From Denver via Carolina
4	29	Philadelphia Waterdogs	Kyle Lewis	Midfield	Adelphi	Northeast-10 Conference	
4	30	California Redwoods	Dante Bowen	SSDM	Syracuse	Atlantic Coast Conference	
4	31	Denver Outlaws	Jack Taylor	Midfield	Jacksonville	Atlantic Sun Conference	
4	32	Maryland Whipsnakes	Braden Erksa	Attack	Maryland	Big Ten Conference	From New York

==== Trades ====
In the explanations below, (PD) indicates trades completed prior to the start of the draft (i.e. Pre-Draft), while (D) denotes trades that took place during the 2026 draft.

===== First round =====
1. No. 4: Chaos → Outlaws (D). During the 2026 Draft, the Chaos traded the 4th overall pick to the Outlaws for the 7th, 22nd and 28th overall picks.
2. No. 7: Outlaws → Chaos (D). See pick 4.

===== Second round =====
1. No. 15: Outlaws → Cannons (PD). On November 7, 2024, the Cannons traded Pat Kavanagh to the Outlaws for a 2025 1st and 2026 2nd.

===== Third round =====
1. No. 20: Chaos → Cannons (PD). On March 3, 2025, the Cannons traded Carter Parlette and Chris Aslanian to the Chaos for a 2026 2nd.
2. No. 22: Redwoods → Outlaws (PD). On June 9, 2025, the Outlaws traded Sam Handley to the Redwoods for a 2026 2nd.
  No. 22: Outlaws → Chaos (D). See pick 4.
3. No. 23: Outlaws → Waterdogs (PD). On April 14, 2026, the Waterdogs traded Ben Randall to the Outlaws for a 2026 23th overall pick.

===== Fourth round =====
1. No. 26: Cannons → Redwoods (PD). On March 21, 2025, the Redwoods traded Owen Grant to the Cannons for the 2025 3rd overall pick and 2026 4th.
2. No. 28: Chaos → Outlaws (PD). On March 14, 2025, the Outlaws traded Josh Zawada to the Chaos for a 2026 4th.
  No. 28: Outlaws → Chaos (D). See pick 4.
3. No. 32: Atlas → Whipsnakes (PD). On April 14, 2026, the Whipsnakes traded Levi Anderson to the Atlas for a 2026 32th overall pick.

== Tour map ==
Tour locations for the 2026 PLL season
Legend:
: Home-city location
: Neutral-site tour location
: All-Star Game location
: Quarterfinals location
: Semifinals location
: Finals location

== Tour venues ==
Week	Venue	Home team	Location	Capacity (Note: Capacity may not reflect the capacity for the PLL's purposes due to various areas of the stadium potentially being closed for lacrosse games)	Image
1	Zions Bank Stadium	Utah Archers	Salt Lake City, UT	5,000	Photo of the exterior of Zions Bank Stadium
2	Centreville Bank Stadium	Neutral Site	Pawtucket, RI	10,500	
3	Ridley Athletic Complex	Maryland Whipsnakes	Baltimore, MD	6,000	
4	American Legion Memorial Stadium	Carolina Chaos	Charlotte, NC	10,500	Photo of an empty American Legion Memorial Stadium from the top row of a corner section
5	James M. Shuart Stadium	New York Atlas	Hempstead, NY	11,929	
6	Torero Stadium	California Redwoods	San Diego, CA	6,000	An aerial photo of an empty Rafferty Stadium
7	Navy–Marine Corps Memorial Stadium	Neutral Site	Annapolis, MD	34,000	
8	Northwestern Medicine Field at Martin Stadium	Neutral Site	Chicago, IL	12,023	
9	Rafferty Stadium	Neutral Site	Fairfield, CT	3,500	
10	Peter Barton Stadium	Denver Outlaws	Denver, CO	2,000	
11	Ohio State Lacrosse Stadium	Neutral Site	Columbus, OH	2,100	
12	Harvard Stadium	Boston Cannons	Boston, MA	25,000	
13	Subaru Park	Philadelphia Waterdogs	Philadelphia, PA	18,500	
14	TCO Stadium	Neutral Site	Eagan, MN	6,000	
15	Zions Bank Stadium	Utah Archers	Salt Lake City, UT	5,000	Photo of the exterior of Zions Bank Stadium
16	Sports Illustrated Stadium	Neutral Site	Harrison, NJ	25,000	

== Schedule ==
Every team has one weekend where they are the home team and that means they will play a weekend doubleheader. Each team will their play in-conference opponents twice plus they will play out-of-conference opponents once. All games are streamed on ESPN+ during the season.

Week	Date	Games	Time (ET)	Network (Note: All games streamed on ESPN+ alongside the network listed.)	Venue	City
1 Archers Homecoming	May 8	California Redwoods (9–5) Utah Archers	8 pm	ESPN+	Zions Bank Stadium	Salt Lake City, UT
1 Archers Homecoming	May 8	New York Atlas (16–12) Carolina Chaos	10:30 pm	ESPN+	Zions Bank Stadium	Salt Lake City, UT
1 Archers Homecoming	May 9	Philadelphia Waterdogs (16–14) Maryland Whipsnakes	4:30 pm	ESPN+	Zions Bank Stadium	Salt Lake City, UT
1 Archers Homecoming	May 9	Denver Outlaws (7–10) Utah Archers	7 pm	ESPN2	Zions Bank Stadium	Salt Lake City, UT
2 WLL Opening Weekend	May 15	Carolina Chaos (14–10) Boston Cannons	6 pm	ESPN+	Centreville Bank Stadium	Rhode Island
2 WLL Opening Weekend	May 15	New York Atlas (6–12) Maryland Whipsnakes	8:30 pm	ESPN+	Centreville Bank Stadium	Rhode Island
2 WLL Opening Weekend	May 16	California Redwoods (9–10) Denver Outlaws	1 pm	ESPN+	Centreville Bank Stadium	Rhode Island
2 WLL Opening Weekend	May 16	Philadelphia Waterdogs (5–19) Boston Cannons	8 pm	ESPN+	Centreville Bank Stadium	Rhode Island
3 Whipsnakes Homecoming	May 29	Boston Cannons (10–17) Maryland Whipsnakes	6 pm	ESPN+	Ridley Athletic Complex	Baltimore, MD
3 Whipsnakes Homecoming	May 30	New York Atlas (9–16) Denver Outlaws	1 pm	ABC	Ridley Athletic Complex	Baltimore, MD
3 Whipsnakes Homecoming	May 30	Utah Archers (5–8) Maryland Whipsnakes	5:30 pm	ESPN+	Ridley Athletic Complex	Baltimore, MD
3 Whipsnakes Homecoming	May 30	Carolina Chaos (10–8) Philadelphia Waterdogs	8 pm	ESPN+	Ridley Athletic Complex	Baltimore, MD
4 Chaos Homecoming	June 5	Utah Archers (15–7) Carolina Chaos	6 pm	ESPN+	American Legion Memorial Stadium	Charlotte, NC
4 Chaos Homecoming	June 5	California Redwoods (12–11) New York Atlas	8:30 pm	ESPN+	American Legion Memorial Stadium	Charlotte, NC
4 Chaos Homecoming	June 6	Denver Outlaws (11–12) Carolina Chaos	5:30 pm	ESPN+	American Legion Memorial Stadium	Charlotte, NC
4 Chaos Homecoming	June 6	Boston Cannons (10–17) Philadelphia Waterdogs	8 pm	ESPN+	American Legion Memorial Stadium	Charlotte, NC
5 Atlas Homecoming	June 19	Boston Cannons (11–12) New York Atlas	6 pm	ESPN+	James M. Shuart Stadium	Long Island
5 Atlas Homecoming	June 19	Utah Archers (14–16) California Redwoods	8:30 pm	ESPN+	James M. Shuart Stadium	Long Island
5 Atlas Homecoming	June 20	Maryland Whipsnakes (14–16) New York Atlas	9 pm	ESPN2	James M. Shuart Stadium	Long Island
6 Redwoods Homecoming	June 27	Maryland Whipsnakes (7–13) Denver Outlaws	4 pm	ESPN	Torero Stadium	San Diego, CA
6 Redwoods Homecoming	June 27	Boston Cannons (15–12) California Redwoods	8:30 pm	ESPN+	Torero Stadium	San Diego, CA
6 Redwoods Homecoming	June 28	Philadelphia Waterdogs (11–10) Utah Archers	4 pm	ESPN	Torero Stadium	San Diego, CA
6 Redwoods Homecoming	June 28	Carolina Chaos (13–14) California Redwoods	6:30 pm	ESPN+	Torero Stadium	San Diego, CA
7 July 4th & All Star Weekend	July 5	PLL All-Star Game; West (12–9) East	2 pm		Navy–Marine Corps Memorial Stadium	Annapolis, MD
8 Throwback Weekend fueled by Gatorade	July 10	Philadelphia Waterdogs (15–13) California Redwoods	6:30 pm	ESPN+	Northwestern Medicine Field at Martin Stadium	Chicago, IL
8 Throwback Weekend fueled by Gatorade	July 10	Utah Archers (16–5) New York Atlas	9 pm	ESPN2	Northwestern Medicine Field at Martin Stadium	Chicago, IL
8 Throwback Weekend fueled by Gatorade	July 11	Denver Outlaws (13–15) Boston Cannons	2 pm	ESPN+	Northwestern Medicine Field at Martin Stadium	Chicago, IL
8 Throwback Weekend fueled by Gatorade	July 11	Maryland Whipsnakes (17–10) Carolina Chaos	9:30 pm	ESPN+	Northwestern Medicine Field at Martin Stadium	Chicago, IL
9 Indigenous Heritage Weekend	July 17	California Redwoods (7–20) Maryland Whipsnakes	6 pm	ESPN+	Rafferty Stadium	Fairfield, CT
9 Indigenous Heritage Weekend	July 18	Carolina Chaos (8–10) Denver Outlaws	2 pm	ABC	Rafferty Stadium	Fairfield, CT
9 Indigenous Heritage Weekend	July 18	Utah Archers (18–8) Philadelphia Waterdogs	4:30 pm	ESPN+	Rafferty Stadium	Fairfield, CT
9 Indigenous Heritage Weekend	July 19	New York Atlas (13–15) Boston Cannons	3 pm	ABC	Rafferty Stadium	Fairfield, CT
10; Outlaws Homecoming	July 24	Utah Archers (16–11) Denver Outlaws	8 pm	ESPN+	Peter Barton Stadium	Denver, CO
10; Outlaws Homecoming	July 24	Philadelphia Waterdogs (11–10) New York Atlas	10:30 pm	ESPN+	Peter Barton Stadium	Denver, CO
10; Outlaws Homecoming	July 25	Boston Cannons (12–13 OT) Carolina Chaos	2 pm	ESPN+	Peter Barton Stadium	Denver, CO
10; Outlaws Homecoming	July 25	Maryland Whipsnakes (8–13) Utah Archers	6:30 pm	ESPN+	Peter Barton Stadium	Denver, CO
10; Outlaws Homecoming	July 25	Philadelphia Waterdogs (18–8) Denver Outlaws	9 pm	ESPN2	Peter Barton Stadium	Denver, CO
11; Stars & Stripes Classic presented by Anduril	July 31	California Redwoods (10–12) Carolina Chaos	6 pm	ESPN+	Ohio State Lacrosse Stadium	Columbus, OH
11; Stars & Stripes Classic presented by Anduril	July 31	Boston Cannons (11–7) Utah Archers	8:30 pm	ESPN+	Ohio State Lacrosse Stadium	Columbus, OH
11; Stars & Stripes Classic presented by Anduril	August 1	Denver Outlaws (14–13) Maryland Whipsnakes	12:30 pm	ABC	Ohio State Lacrosse Stadium	Columbus, OH
11; Stars & Stripes Classic presented by Anduril	August 1	Carolina Chaos (6–13) Philadelphia Waterdogs	3 pm	ESPN+	Ohio State Lacrosse Stadium	Columbus, OH
11; Stars & Stripes Classic presented by Anduril	August 2	Green Beret Foundation (11–4) Navy SEAL Foundation	12 pm	ESPN+	Ohio State Lacrosse Stadium	Columbus, OH
11; Stars & Stripes Classic presented by Anduril	August 2	New York Atlas (13–21) California Redwoods	3 pm	ABC	Ohio State Lacrosse Stadium	Columbus, OH
12; Cannons Homecoming	August 7	Maryland Whipsnakes (12–14 OT) Boston Cannons	6 pm	ESPN+	Harvard Stadium	Boston, MA
12; Cannons Homecoming	August 7	Carolina Chaos (12–13) Utah Archers	8:30 pm	ESPN+	Harvard Stadium	Boston, MA
12; Cannons Homecoming	August 8	Denver Outlaws (14–9) New York Atlas	1 pm	ABC	Harvard Stadium	Boston, MA
12; Cannons Homecoming	August 8	California Redwoods (9–12) Boston Cannons	8 pm	ESPN+	Harvard Stadium	Boston, MA
13; Waterdogs Homecoming	August 15	New York Atlas (10–18) Philadelphia Waterdogs	2 pm	ABC	Subaru Park	Philadelphia, PA
13; Waterdogs Homecoming	August 16	Maryland Whipsnakes (9–11) Philadelphia Waterdogs	1 pm	ESPN	Subaru Park	Philadelphia, PA
13; Waterdogs Homecoming	August 16	Denver Outlaws (11–18) California Redwoods	3:30 pm	ESPN+	Subaru Park	Philadelphia, PA
14; Quarterfinals	August 29	#3 Denver Outlaws (15–14) #2 California Redwoods	6 pm		TCO Stadium	Minneapolis, MN
14; Quarterfinals	August 29	#3 Maryland Whipsnakes (7–9) #2 Boston Cannons	8:30 pm		TCO Stadium	Minneapolis, MN
15; Semifinals	September 7	#3 Denver Outlaws (11–5) #1 Utah Archers	3 pm		Zions Bank Stadium	Salt Lake City, UT
15; Semifinals	September 7	#2 Boston Cannons (10–13) #1 Philadelphia Waterdogs	5:30 pm		Zions Bank Stadium	Salt Lake City, UT
16; PLL U.S. Bank Championship	September 20	#3 Denver Outlaws (4–14) #1 Philadelphia Waterdogs	12:30 pm		Sports Illustrated Stadium	New Jersey

Notes

== Regular season standings ==
2026 Eastern Conference Standings
Team	W	L	SF	SA	DIF
Philadelphia Waterdogs Y	9	3	151	137	14
Boston Cannons Y	7	5	154	144	10
Maryland Whipsnakes	5	7	151	135	16
New York Atlas	3	9	130	172	−42

2026 Western Conference Standings
Team	W	L	SF	SA	DIF
Utah Archers Y	7	5	142	113	29
California Redwoods Y	6	6	150	151	-1
Denver Outlaws	6	6	138	144	-6
Carolina Chaos	5	7	129	149	−20

Notes

Top Team in Each Conference Received a First-round Bye
Top Three Teams in Each Conference Qualify for the 2026 Playoffs
Last-place Team in Each Conference Miss 2026 Playoffs
Y = Qualified for the Championship Series

Source: Standings - Premier Lacrosse League

== Postseason ==
=== Bracket ===
Quarterfinals; August 29 (Minneapolis, MN)
#2	Cannons	9
#3	Whipsnakes	7
#2	Redwoods	14
#3	Outlaws	15

Semifinals; September 7 (Salt Lake City, UT)
#1	Waterdogs	13
#2	Cannons	10
#1	Archers	5
#3	Outlaws	11

PLL Championship Game; September 20 (New Jersey)
#1	Waterdogs	14
#3	Outlaws	4

== Regular-season statistical leaders ==
Individual
Statistic	Player	Position	Team
Points	Michael Sowers (51)	Attack	Philadelphia Waterdogs
One-point goals	CJ Kirst (34)	Attack	Philadelphia Waterdogs
Two-point goals	Bryan Costabile (7)	Attack	New York Atlas
Scoring Points	CJ Kirst (34)	Attack	Philadelphia Waterdogs
Assists	Michael Sowers (22)	Attack	Philadelphia Waterdogs
Shots	Dylan Molloy (87)	Attack	California Redwoods
Shot Percentage	Finn Thomson (63.6%)	Attack	California Redwoods
Touches	Coulter Mackesy (478)	Attack	Boston Cannons
Faceoff Percentage	Andrew McMeekin (62.5%)	Face-off	Boston Cannons
Save Percentage	Will Mark (70%)	Goaltender	New York Atlas
Caused Turnovers	Brett Makar (24)	Defense	New York Atlas
Groundballs	T. D. Ierlan (111)	Faceoff	California Redwoods

Team
Statistic	Team
Offensive
Scores per Game	Boston Cannons (12.8)
Shots per Game	Boston Cannons (43.8)
Shot Percentage	Maryland Whipsnakes (29.1%)
One-point goals	Boston Cannons (128)
Two-point goals	New York Atlas (14)
Assists	Denver Outlaws (78)
Faceoff Percentage	Boston Cannons (58.5%)
Caused Turnovers	Boston Cannons (99)
Power Play Percentage	Maryland Whipsnakes (44.1%)
Total Passes	Maryland Whipsnakes (2767)
Defensive
Scores Against Average (Low)	Utah Archers (9.4)
Scores Against Average (High)	New York Atlas (14.3)
Caused Turnovers	Boston Cannons (99)
Groundballs Recovered	California Redwoods (415)
Saves Per Game	Boston Cannons (13.8)
Save Percentage	Utah Archers (59.5%)
Power Play and Penalty Kill
Power-play Goal Percentage	Maryland Whipsnakes (44.1%)
Power-play Goals	Archers & Whipsnakes (15)
Penalty-kill Percentage	California Redwoods (72.2%)
Penalty Kills	Utah Archers (29)
Penalties (Low)	California Redwoodss (19)
Penalties (High)	Utah Archers (53)
Penalty Minutes (Low)	California Redwoodss (14.5)
Penalty Minutes (High)	Utah Archers (47)

== Awards ==
=== Players of the Week ===
Date Awarded	Player	Team	Ref.
May 12	Liam Entenmann	New York Atlas	
May 19	Colin Kirst	Boston Cannons	
June 2	Joey Spallina	Maryland Whipsnakes	
June 9	Mac O'Keefe	Utah Archers	
June 24	Dylan Molloy	California Redwoods	
June 30	Dillon Ward	California Redwoods	
July 7	Liam Entenmann	New York Atlas	
July 14	CJ Kirst	Philadelphia Waterdogs	
July 21	Rob Pannell	Maryland Whipsnakes	
July 28	CJ Kirst	Philadelphia Waterdogs	
August 4	Chris Kavanagh	California Redwoods	
August 11	Owen McElroy	Denver Outlaws	
August 18	Sean Byrne	Philadelphia Waterdogs	
September 2	Ethan Rall	Boston Cannons	
September 9	CJ Kirst	Philadelphia Waterdogs	
September 22	CJ Kirst	Philadelphia Waterdogs	

=== Individual Season Awards ===
On September 2, the PLL announced the finalists for its 2026 end-of-season awards via social media platforms.
On September 18, Winners revealed live at the PLL End of Season Awards Ceremony.

==== List of awards and finalists ====
The winner of the award are highlighted in bold.

===== Jim Brown Most Valuable Player =====
- Brett Dobson (Utah Archers)
- Michael Sowers (Philadelphia Waterdogs)
- **CJ Kirst** (Philadelphia Waterdogs)
- Marcus Holman (Boston Cannons)

===== Eamon McEneaney Attackman of the Year =====
- Chris Kavanagh (California Redwoods)
- **Michael Sowers** (Philadelphia Waterdogs)
- CJ Kirst (Philadelphia Waterdogs)
- Marcus Holman (Boston Cannons)

===== Gait Brothers Midfielder of the Year =====
- Tre Leclaire (Utah Archers)
- Aidan Carroll (Maryland Whipsnakes)
- **Zach Currier** (Philadelphia Waterdogs)
- Chad Palumbo (Carolina Chaos)

===== Dave Pietramala Defensive Player of the Year =====
- JT Giles-Harris (Denver Outlaws)
- **Brendan Lavelle** (Utah Archers)
- Brett Makar (New York Atlas)
- Gavin Adler (Philadelphia Waterdogs)

===== Oren Lyons Goalie of the Year =====
- Emmet Carroll (Maryland Whipsnakes)
- **Brett Dobson** (Utah Archers)
- Blaze Riorden (Carolina Chaos)

===== Paul Cantabene Face-Off Athlete of the Year =====
- Mike Sisselberger (Utah Archers)
- TD Ierlan (California Redwoods)
- **Andrew McMeekin** (Boston Cannons)

===== Brodie Merrill Long Stick Midfielder of the Year =====
- Jared Conners (California Redwoods)
- Jake Piseno (Denver Outlaws)
- **Ethan Rall** (Boston Cannons)

===== George Boiardi Hard Hat Award - Awarded to the SSDM of the year =====
- Beau Pederson (Utah Archers)
- Piper Bond (Utah Archers)
- **Brian Tevlin** (California Redwoods)

===== Rookie of the Year =====
- Chad Palumbo (Carolina Chaos)
- **Joey Spallina** (Maryland Whipsnakes)
- Andrew McMeekin (Boston Cannons)
- Ryan Stines (Utah Archers)

===== Comeback Player of the Year =====
- Mike Sisselberger (Utah Archers)
- **Xander Dickson** (New York Atlas)
- Dillon Ward (California Redwoods)

===== Dick Edell Coach of the Year =====
- Brian Holman (Boston Cannons)
- Chris Bates (Utah Archers)
- **Bill Tierney** (Philadelphia Waterdogs)

===== Dave Huntley Sportsmanship Award =====
- Ryan Ambler (Utah Archers)
- **Trevor Baptiste** (New York Atlas)
- TJ Malone (Maryland Whipsnakes)

===== Welles Crowther Humanitarian Award =====
- **Mason Woodward** (Utah Archers)
- Piper Bond (Utah Archers)
- Trevor Baptiste (New York Atlas)

===== Jimmy Regan Teammate Award =====
- **Connor Kirst** (Boston Cannons)
- Austin Kaut (Carolina Chaos)
- Josh Balcarcel (California Redwoods)

===== Brendan Looney Leadership Award =====
- Matt Dunn (Maryland Whipsnakes)
- **Mike Manley** (Denver Outlaws)
- Blaze Riorden (Carolina Chaos)

=== Team ===
Award		Attack			Faceoff	Midfield		
**All-Pro Offensive**	**First Team**	CJ Kirst (Philadelphia Waterdogs)	Marcus Holman (Boston Cannons)	Michael Sowers (Philadelphia Waterdogs)	Andrew McMeekin (Boston Cannons)	Aidan Carroll (Maryland Whipsnakes)	Zach Currier (Philadelphia Waterdogs)	Tre Leclaire (Utah Archers)
**All-Pro Offensive**	**Second Team**	Coulter Mackesy (Boston Cannons)	Brennan O'Neill (Denver Outlaws)	Joey Spallina (Maryland Whipsnakes)	TD Ierlan (California Redwoods)	Bryan Costabile (New York Atlas)	Chad Palumbo (Carolina Chaos)	Andrew McAdorey (California Redwoods)
Award		Defense			LSM	SSDM		Goalie
**All-Pro Defensive**	**First Team**	Brendan Lavelle (Utah Archers)	Gavin Adler (Philadelphia Waterdogs)	Brett Makar (New York Atlas)	Ethan Rall (Boston Cannons)	Brian Tevlin (California Redwoods)	Piper Bond (Utah Archers)	Brett Dobson (Utah Archers)
**All-Pro Defensive**	**Second Team**	JT Giles-Harris (Denver Outlaws)	Mason Woodward (Utah Archers)	Ajax Zappitello (Maryland Whipsnakes)	Jake Piseno (Denver Outlaws)	Beau Pederson (Utah Archers)	Ryan Terefenko (Denver Outlaws)	Emmet Carroll (Maryland Whipsnakes)

== See also ==
- 2026 Women's Lacrosse League season
