= 2022 Premier Lacrosse League season =

Fourth season of the Premier Lacrosse League

- League: Premier Lacrosse League
- Sport: Field lacrosse
- Duration: June 4 – September 18
- Teams: 8

Draft
- Top draft pick: Logan Wisnauskas
- Picked by: Chrome Lacrosse Club

Regular season
- Season MVP: Trevor Baptiste (New York Atlas)
- Top scorer: Lyle Thompson (Boston Cannons)

Playoffs
- Finals champions: Philadelphia Waterdogs
- Runners-up: Carolina Chaos
- Finals MVP: Michael Sowers (Waterdogs)

PLL seasons
- ← 2021 2023 →

The 2022 Premier Lacrosse League season was the fourth season of the Premier Lacrosse League (PLL). It was held from June 4 to September 18.

== Player movement ==
=== College Draft ===
The 2022 Premier Lacrosse League college draft was held on May 10 and began at 8:00PM eastern time. The draft was the first PLL property to be broadcast on an ESPN network when it aired on ESPN U. There was a simulcast on ESPN+ as well. Chris Cotter, Ryan Boyle and Paul Carcaterra hosted the draft and analyzed the picks. This draft featured the first ever draft day trade between Atlas LC and Cannons LC. The University of Maryland set a record for the most players drafted in one draft with six. By virtue of having the worst record last season, Chrome LC held the number one overall pick.

Format:

- Each team was awarded one pick in each of the four rounds.
- Eligible players must currently be in their senior year

| Rnd. | Pick # | PLL Team | Player | Pos. | College | Conf. | Notes |
|---|---|---|---|---|---|---|---|
| 1 | 1 | Chrome | Logan Wisnauskas | Attack | Maryland | Big Ten Conference | |
| 1 | 2 | Atlas | Chris Gray | Attack | North Carolina | Atlantic Coast Conference | From Cannons |
| 1 | 3 | Redwoods | Arden Cohen | Defense | Notre Dame | Atlantic Coast Conference | |
| 1 | 4 | Archers | Matt Moore | Attack/Midfield | Virginia | Atlantic Coast Conference | |
| 1 | 5 | Atlas | Koby Smith | LSM | Towson | Colonial Athletic Association | |
| 1 | 6 | Chaos | Brett Kennedy | Defense | Syracuse | Atlantic Coast Conference | |
| 1 | 7 | Whipsnakes | Roman Puglise | SSDM | Maryland | Big Ten Conference | |
| 1 | 8 | Chaos | Zach Geddes | SSDM | Georgetown | Big East Conference | |
| 2 | 9 | Chrome | Brendan Nichtern | Attack | Army | Patriot League | |
| 2 | 10 | Cannons | Asher Nolting | Attack | High Point | Southern Conference | |
| 2 | 11 | Cannons | Bubba Fairman | Midfield | Maryland | Big Ten Conference | From Atlas |
| 2 | 12 | Archers | Brett Dobson | Goalie | St. Bonaventure | Metro Atlantic Athletic Conference | |
| 2 | 13 | Atlas | Brendan Curry | Midfield | Syracuse | Atlantic Coast Conference | |
| 2 | 14 | Waterdogs | Jack Hannah | Midfield | Denver | Big East Conference | |
| 2 | 15 | Whipsnakes | Wheaton Jackoboice | Midfield | Notre Dame | Atlantic Coast Conference | |
| 2 | 16 | Chaos | Jonathan Donville | Midfield | Maryland/Cornell | Big Ten Conference/Ivy League | |
| 3 | 17 | Chrome | Ryan McNulty | LSM | Loyola | Patriot League | |
| 3 | 18 | Archers | Justin Inacio | Face-Off | Ohio State | Big Ten Conference | |
| 3 | 19 | Redwoods | Nakeie Montgomery | Midfield | Duke | Atlantic Coast Conference | |
| 3 | 20 | Whipsnakes | Keegan Khan | Attack | Maryland/Villanova | Big Ten Conference/Big East Conference | |
| 3 | 21 | Atlas | Max Wayne | Defense | Christopher Newport | Coast-To-Coast Athletic Conference | |
| 3 | 22 | Waterdogs | Jake Higgins | SSDM | Maryland | Big Ten Conference | |
| 3 | 23 | Cannons | Bryan McIntosh | Defense | Hofstra/Mount St. Mary's | Colonial Athletic Association/Northeast Conference | |
| 3 | 24 | Cannons | Colin Kirst | Goalie | Rutgers/Lehigh | Big Ten Conference/Patriot League | From Atlas |
| 4 | 25 | Chrome | Owen McElroy | Goalie | Georgetown | Big East Conference | |
| 4 | 26 | Whipsnakes | Jackson Reid | Midfield | Ohio State | Big Ten Conference | |
| 4 | 27 | Redwoods | Mitch Bartolo | Attack/Midfield | Rutgers/Penn | Big Ten Conference/Ivy League | |
| 4 | 28 | Archers | Jon Robbins | Defense | Bellarmine | ASUN | |
| 4 | 29 | Archers | Ryan Aughavin | Midfield | Brown | Ivy League | |
| 4 | 30 | Waterdogs | Jason Reynolds | Defense | Notre Dame/Richmond | Atlantic Coast Conference/Southern Conference | |
| 4 | 31 | Whipsnakes | Colin Hinton | Defense | Jacksonville | Southern Conference | |
| 4 | 32 | Chaos | Kevin Lindley | Attack | Loyola | Patriot League | |

Note: For athletes that went to multiple universities, the first university listed is the university the player finished their career with.

== Tour Map ==
Tour locations for the 2022 PLL season

Legend:
: Regular Season Tour Location
: All-Star Game Location & Quarterfinals Location
: Semifinals Location

: Finals Location

== Schedule ==
| Week | Date | Games | Time (ET) | Venue | City | Attendance | Ref. |
|---|---|---|---|---|---|---|---|
| 1 | June 4 | Whipsnakes; 9 – 8 Chaos | 2:15 pm | Tom & Mary Casey Stadium | Albany, NY | TBD | |
| 1 | June 4 | Redwoods; 11–17; Atlas | 5:00 pm | Tom & Mary Casey Stadium | Albany, NY | TBD | |
| 1 | June 5 | Waterdogs; 10–16; Cannons | 1:00 pm | Tom & Mary Casey Stadium | Albany, NY | TBD | |
| 1 | June 5 | Chrome; 11–10; Archers | 3:45 pm | Tom & Mary Casey Stadium | Albany, NY | TBD | |
| 2 | June 10 | Chrome; 12–3; Redwoods | 6:00 pm | American Legion Memorial Stadium | Charlotte, NC | TBD | |
| 2 | June 10 | Chaos; 12–17; Archers | 8:45 pm | American Legion Memorial Stadium | Charlotte, NC | TBD | |
| 2 | June 11 | Atlas; 16–8; Cannons | 6:00 pm | American Legion Memorial Stadium | Charlotte, NC | TBD | |
| 2 | June 11 | Whipsnakes; 12–11; Waterdogs | 8:45 pm | American Legion Memorial Stadium | Charlotte, NC | TBD | |
| 3 | June 17 | Waterdogs; 14–17; Chrome | 6:00 pm | Shuart Stadium | Hempstead, Long Island (New York) | TBD | |
| 3 | June 17 | Atlas; 9–12; Whipsnakes | 8:45 pm | Shuart Stadium | Hempstead, Long Island (New York) | TBD | |
| 3 | June 18 | Redwoods; 11–7; Chaos | 1:00 pm | Shuart Stadium | Hempstead, Long Island (New York) | TBD | |
| 3 | June 18 | Cannons; 9–20; Archers | 4:00 pm | Shuart Stadium | Hempstead, Long Island (New York) | TBD | |
| 4 | June 24 | Redwoods; 11–12; Whipsnakes | 6:30 pm | Homewood Field | Baltimore, MD | TBD | |
| 4 | June 24 | Chaos; 9–18; Waterdogs | 9:15 pm | Homewood Field | Baltimore, MD | TBD | |
| 4 | June 25 | Cannons; 11–12; Chrome | 6:00 pm | Homewood Field | Baltimore, MD | TBD | |
| 4 | June 25 | Archers; 9–10; Atlas | 8:45 pm | Homewood Field | Baltimore, MD | TBD | |
| 5 | July 1 | Archers; 10–9; Redwoods | 7:00 pm | TCO Stadium | Eagan, MN (Minneapolis) | TBD | |
| 5 | July 1 | Atlas; 14–13; Chrome | 9:45 pm | TCO Stadium | Eagan, MN (Minneapolis) | TBD | |
| 5 | July 2 | Chaos; 13–11; Cannons | 6:00 pm | TCO Stadium | Eagan, MN (Minneapolis) | TBD | |
| 5 | July 2 | Whipsnakes; 10–11; Waterdogs | 8:45 pm | TCO Stadium | Eagan, MN (Minneapolis) | TBD | |
| PLL All-Star Game | July 16 | Team Farrell; 13–33; Team Baptise | 4:00 pm | Gillette Stadium | Foxborough, MA (Boston) | TBD | |
| PLL All-Star Game | July 16 | Skills Competition | 7:00 pm | Gillette Stadium | Foxborough, MA (Boston) | TBD | |
| 7 | July 23 | Redwoods; 16–15; Atlas | 5:00 pm | Rafferty Stadium | Fairfield, CT | TBD | |
| 7 | July 23 | Whipsnakes; 14–12; Chaos | 7:45 pm | Rafferty Stadium | Fairfield, CT | TBD | |
| 7 | July 24 | Cannons; 12–17; Archers | 2:00 pm | Rafferty Stadium | Fairfield, CT | TBD | |
| 7 | July 24 | Chrome; 10–11; Waterdogs | 8:45 pm | Rafferty Stadium | Fairfield, CT | TBD | |
| 8 | July 30 | Archers; 9–14; Atlas | 2:00 pm | Ford Center at The Star | Frisco, TX (Dallas) | TBD | |
| 8 | July 30 | Chrome; 8–9; Whipsnakes | 4:45 pm | Ford Center at The Star | Frisco, TX (Dallas) | TBD | |
| 8 | July 31 | Waterdogs; 15–14; Cannons | 1:00 pm | Ford Center at The Star | Frisco, TX (Dallas) | TBD | |
| 8 | July 31 | Redwoods; 12–14; Chaos | 3:45 pm | Ford Center at The Star | Frisco, TX (Dallas) | TBD | |
| 9 | August 5 | Cannons; 12–15; Redwoods | 9:00 pm | Barton Stadium | Denver, CO | TBD | |
| 9 | August 6 | Chaos; 9–13; Chrome | 2:00 pm | Barton Stadium | Denver, CO | TBD | |
| 9 | August 6 | Waterdogs; 16–15; Atlas | 4:45 pm | Barton Stadium | Denver, CO | TBD | |
| 9 | August 6 | Archers; 11–13; Whipsnakes | 7;30 pm | Barton Stadium | Denver, CO | TBD | |
| 10 | August 12 | Atlas; 8–16; Whipsnakes | 8:00 pm | Zions Bank Stadium | Herriman, UT (Salt Lake City) | TBD | |
| 10 | August 12 | Waterdogs; 12–14; Redwoods | 10:45 pm | Zions Bank Stadium | Herriman, UT (Salt Lake City) | TBD | |
| 10 | August 13 | Chaos; 8–11; Archers | 3:00 pm | Zions Bank Stadium | Herriman, UT (Salt Lake City) | TBD | |
| 10 | August 13 | Cannons; 9–11; Chrome | 5:45 pm | Zions Bank Stadium | Herriman, UT (Salt Lake City) | TBD | |
| 11 | August 20 | Chrome; 13–12; Redwoods | 7:00 pm | Tacoma Dome | Tacoma, WA (Seattle) | TBD | |
| 11 | August 20 | Archers; 16–12; Waterdogs | 9:45 pm | Tacoma Dome | Tacoma, WA (Seattle) | TBD | |
| 11 | August 21 | Whipsnakes; 11–9; Cannons | 3:00 pm | Tacoma Dome | Tacoma, WA (Seattle) | TBD | |
| 11 | August 21 | Atlas; 10–9; Chaos | 5:45 pm | Tacoma Dome | Tacoma, WA (Seattle) | TBD | |
| 9 Playoffs (Quarterfinals) | September 3 | Chaos; 11–3; Chrome | 12:00 pm | Gillette Stadium | Foxborough, MA (Boston) | | |
| 9 Playoffs (Quarterfinals) | September 3 | Redwoods; 8–13; Archers | 2:30 pm | Gillette Stadium | Foxborough, MA (Boston) | | |
| 9 Playoffs (Quarterfinals) | September 3 | Waterdogs; 19–14; Atlas | 6:00 pm | Gillette Stadium | Foxborough, MA (Boston) | | |
| 10; Playoffs (Semifinals) | September 11 | Waterdogs; 11–10; Whipsnakes | 12:15 pm | Audi Field | Washington, D.C. | | |
| 10; Playoffs (Semifinals) | September 11 | Chaos; 9–7; Archers | 3:00 pm | Audi Field | Washington, D.C. | | |
| 11; PLL Championship | September 18 | Chaos; 9–11; Waterdogs | 3:00 pm | Subaru Park | Chester, PA (Philadelphia) | | |

== Playoffs ==
Quarterfinals
5 | Waterdogs | 19
4 | Atlas | 14
3 | Archers | 13
6 | Redwoods | 8
7 | Chaos | 11
2 | Chrome | 3

Semifinals
1 | Whipsnakes | 10
Waterdogs | 11
Archers | 7
Chaos | 9

PLL Championship
Waterdogs | 11
Chaos | 9

== Standings ==
2022 Premier Lacrosse League Standings
| Team | W | L | T | PCT | GB | SF | SA | Diff |
|---|---|---|---|---|---|---|---|---|
| Whipsnakes | 9 | 1 | 0 | .900 | — | 118 | 98 | 20 |
| Chrome | 7 | 3 | 0 | .700 | 2 | 120 | 102 | 18 |
| Archers | 6 | 4 | 0 | .600 | 3 | 130 | 110 | 20 |
| Atlas | 6 | 4 | 0 | .600 | 3 | 128 | 119 | 9 |
| Waterdogs | 5 | 5 | 0 | .500 | 4 | 130 | 133 | -3 |
| Redwoods | 4 | 6 | 0 | .400 | 5 | 114 | 124 | -10 |
| Chaos | 2 | 8 | 0 | .200 | 7 | 101 | 126 | -25 |
| Cannons | 1 | 9 | 0 | .100 | 8 | 111 | 140 | -29 |

Top 7 Teams Qualify for 2022 Playoffs
8th Place Misses 2022 Playoffs
Top 4 Teams Qualify for 2023 Championship Series

Last updated: August 24, 2022

== League leaders ==
Points
| Player | Team | Points | Average (per game) |
|---|---|---|---|
| Lyle Thompson | Cannons | 44 | — |
| Kieran McArdle | Waterdogs | 42 | — |
| Rob Pannell | Redwoods | 38 | — |
| Jeff Teat | Atlas | 38 | — |
| Brandan Nichtern | Chrome | 38 | — |
| Tom Schreiber | Archers | 35 | — |
| Logan Wisnauskas | Chrome | 35 | — |
| Chris Gray | Atlas | 34 | — |
| Will Manny | Archers | 33 | — |
| Michael Sowers | Waterdogs | 32 | — |

Goals
| Player | Team | Goals | Average (per game) |
|---|---|---|---|
| Lyle Thompson | Cannons | 26 | — |
| Logan Wisnauskas | Chrome | 24 | — |
| Jeff Teat | Atlas | 22 | — |
| Michael Sowers | Waterdogs | 21 | — |
| Matt Rambo | Whipsnakes | 21 | — |
| Kieran McArdle | Waterdogs | 19 | — |
| Ryder Garnsey | Redwoods | 19 | — |
| Eric Law | Atlas | 18 | — |
| Charlie Bertrand | Redwoods | 18 | — |
| Tom Schreiber | Archers | 17 | — |

Assists
| Player | Team | Assists | Average (per game) |
|---|---|---|---|
| Kieran McArdle | Waterdogs | 23 | — |
| Rob Pannell | Redwoods | 22 | — |
| Brandon Nichtern | Chrome | 22 | — |
| Lyle Thompson | Cannons | 18 | — |
| Will Manny | Archers | 17 | — |
| Dhane Smith | Chaos | 17 | — |
| Jeff Teat | Atlas | 16 | — |
| Chris Gray | Atlas | 16 | — |
| Tom Schreiber | Archers | 14 | — |
| Logan Wisnauskas | Chrome | 11 | — |

Save Percentage
| Player | Team | Saves | Percentage |
|---|---|---|---|
| Blaze Riorden | Chaos | 137 | 54% |
| Jack Concannon | Atlas | 125 | 55% |
| Kyle Bernlohr | Whipsnakes | 125 | 58% |
| Nick Marrocco | Archers | 123 | 50% |
| Sean Sconone | Chrome | 113 | 54% |
| Adam Ghitleman | Archers | 89 | 49% |
| Dillon Ward | Waterdogs | 73 | 51% |
| Jack Kelly | Redwoods | 71 | 46% |
| Matt DeLuca | Waterdogs | 46 | 44% |
| Tim Troutner | Redwoods | 20 | 38% |

Last Updated: September 21, 2022
