= 2019 Redwoods Lacrosse Club season =

1st season in franchise history

2019 Redwoods Lacrosse Club
- League: Premier Lacrosse League
- 2019 record: 5–5
- General Manager: Nat St. Laurent
- Coach: Nat St. Laurent

The 2019 Redwoods Lacrosse Club season was the inaugural season of the Redwoods Lacrosse Club (now the California Redwoods) of the Premier Lacrosse League (PLL). The Redwoods finished with a 5–5 record and qualified for the playoffs. The Redwoods reached the final where they lost 12–11 in overtime to the Whipsnakes Lacrosse Club.

== College draft ==
2019 Redwoods Lacrosse Club college draft selections
Round	Selection	Player	Position	College	Notes
1	5	Clarke Petterson	Attack	Cornell	
2	8	Tyler Dunn	Defensive Midfield	Penn	
3	17	Brendan Gleason	Midfield	Notre Dame	
4	20	Tim Troutner	Goalie	High Point	

== Regular season ==
=== Schedule ===
Week	Date	Opponent	Result	Record	Venue	Recap
1	June 2	Atlas	W 11–9	1–0	Gillette Stadium	Recap
2	June 8	Archers	L 9–10	1–1	Red Bull Arena	Recap
3	June 15	Chaos	L 11–12 (OT)	1–2	SeatGeek Stadium	Recap
4	June 22	Chrome	W 13–11	2–2	Homewood Field	Recap
5	June 29	Whipsnakes	W 14–11	3–2	Center Parc Stadium	Recap
6	July 6	Archers	W 9–8 (OT)	4–2	Audi Field	Recap
7	July 27	Atlas	L 15–18	4–3	Dick's Sporting Goods Park	Recap
8	August 10	Chaos	L 10–13	4–4	Avaya Stadium	Recap
9	August 18	Whipsnakes	L 4–17	4–5	Tim Hortons Field	Recap
10	August 25	Chrome	W 18–7	5–5	Bob Ford Field at Tom & Mary Casey Stadium	Recap

=== Game summaries ===
==== Week 1: Atlas ====
June 2, 2019; 1:30 p.m. EDT	Redwoods	11–9 (5–2, 6–5, 9–8, 11–9)	Atlas	Gillette Stadium, Foxborough

Game reference
	Point scorers
57	Shots	42

==== Week 2: Archers ====
June 8, 2019; 4:00 p.m. EDT	Redwoods	9–10 (2–3, 6–4, 8–7, 9–10)	Archers	Red Bull Arena, Harrison

Game reference
	Point scorers
40	Shots	34

==== Week 3: Chaos ====
June 15, 2019; 2:00 p.m. EDT	Chaos	12–11 (OT) (3–4, 7–5, 9–8, 11–11, 12–11)	Redwoods	SeatGeek Stadium, Bridgeview

Game reference
	Point scorers
29	Shots	47

==== Week 4: Chrome ====
June 22, 2019; 1:00 p.m. EDT	Chrome	11–13 (2–5, 6–7, 9–12, 11–13)	Redwoods	Homewood Field, Baltimore

Game reference
	Point scorers
39	Shots	44

==== Week 5: Whipsnakes ====
June 29, 2019; 4:00 p.m. EDT	Redwoods	14–11 (2–1, 5–7, 10–9, 14–11)	Whipsnakes	Center Parc Stadium, Atlanta

Game reference
	Point scorers
43	Shots	50

==== Week 6: Archers ====
July 6, 2019; 5:00 p.m.	Archers	8–9 (OT) (2–1, 4–4, 5–8, 8–8, 8–9)	Redwoods	Audi Field, Washington, D.C.

Game reference
Point scorers

==== Week 7: Atlas ====
July 27, 2019; 5:00 p.m. EDT	Atlas	18–15 (9–2, 14–6, 18–12, 18–15)	Redwoods	Dick's Sporting Goods Park, Commerce City

Game reference
	Point scorers
38	Shots	39

==== Week 8: Chaos ====
August 10, 2019; 4:00 p.m.	Redwoods	10–13 (3–2, 5–7, 8–9, 10–13)	Chaos	Avaya Stadium, San Jose

Game reference
	Point scorers
45	Shots	42

==== Week 9: Whipsnakes ====
August 18, 2019; 6:00 p.m. EDT	Whipsnakes	17–4 (4–0, 12–1, 17–3, 17–4)	Redwoods	Tim Hortons Field, Hamilton

Game reference
	Point scorers
43	Shots	37

==== Week 10: Chrome ====
August 25, 2019; 1:30 p.m.	Redwoods	18–7 (3–3, 8–6, 11–6, 18–7)	Chrome	Bob Ford Field at Tom & Mary Casey Stadium, Albany

Game reference
	Point scorers
52	Shots	30

=== Standings ===
2019 Premier Lacrosse League Standings
Team	W	L	PCT	S	SA	SD
^{(1)} Chaos	7	3	.700	130	128	2
^{(2)} Whipsnakes	6	4	.600	125	116	9
^{(3)} Archers	5	5	.500	112	106	6
^{(4)} Redwoods	5	5	.500	116	117	–1
Atlas	5	5	.500	125	132	–7
Chrome	8	.200	5	127	137	–10

== Postseason ==
=== Schedule ===
Week	Date	Opponent	Result	Record	Venue	Recap
Round 1	September 6	Archers (3)	W 16–12	1–0	Mapfre Stadium	Recap
Round 2	September 14	Chaos (1)	W 12–7	2–0	Red Bull Arena	Recap
Championship	September 21	Whipsnakes (2)	L 11–12 (OT)	2–1	Talen Energy Stadium	Recap

=== Game summaries ===
==== Round 1: Archers ====
September 6, 2019; 7:00 p.m. EDT	Redwoods	16–12 (2–3, 5–6, 14–11, 16–12)	Archers	Mapfre Stadium, Columbus

Game reference
	Point scorers
32	Shots	41

==== Round 2: Chaos ====
September 14, 2019; 8:00 p.m. EDT	Redwoods	12–7 (5–1, 6–6, 10–6, 12–7)	Chaos	Red Bull Arena, Harrison

Game reference
	Point scorers
38	Shots	33

==== Championship: Whipsnakes ====
September 21, 2019; 2:30 p.m. EDT	Whipsnakes	12–11 (OT) (1–1, 2–5, 6–9, 11–11, 12–11)	Redwoods	Talen Energy Stadium, Chester

Game reference
	Point scorers
35	Shots	36
