= 2020 Premier Lacrosse League season =

Inaugural season of the Premier Lacrosse League

- League: Premier Lacrosse League
- Sport: Field lacrosse
- Duration: July 25 – August 9
- Teams: 7

Draft
- Top draft pick: Zach Currier
- Picked by: Philadelphia Waterdogs

Regular season
- Season MVP: Zed Williams (Maryland Whipsnakes)
- Top scorer: Zed Williams (Maryland Whipsnakes)

Playoffs
- Finals champions: Maryland Whipsnakes
- Runners-up: Carolina Chaos
- Finals MVP: Zed Williams (Whipsnakes)

PLL seasons
- ← 2019 2021 →

The 2020 Premier Lacrosse League season was the second season for the Premier Lacrosse League (PLL). The season was originally set to begin on May 29 and culminate with a championship game played in late September. Due to the spread of COVID-19, the league postponed the start of their season, and in May announced their season would take place as a championship series between July 25 and August 9, replacing NBCUniversal's coverage of the 2020 Summer Olympics. The Championship Series consisted of playoff seedings based on 4 games of group play taking place at Zions Bank Stadium just outside of Salt Lake City, Utah. The series began with the Whipsnakes Lacrosse Club as the defending league champions and the Waterdogs Lacrosse Club joining the league as an expansion team.

== Milestones and events ==
- February 27 – The league announces Ticketmaster as their Presenting Sponsor and Official Ticketing Partner.
- May 6 – The league announces the regular season will be replaced with a condensed Championship Series due to ongoing COVID-19 concerns. A total of 20 games are set to take place between July 25 and August 9.
- June 11 – The league announces the Championship Series will take place in Herriman, Utah just outside of Salt Lake City. Games will be played inside of Zions Bank Stadium, home of Real Monarchs in the USL Championship.

=== Coaching changes ===
- Atlas Lacrosse Club – Ben Rubeor was announced the new Atlas head coach after John Paul announced his retirement. Rubeor joins the lacrosse club after serving as an offensive coordinator in the MLL. He played collegiately at the University of Virginia and had a seven-year career at the professional level.
- Chrome Lacrosse Club – Tim Soudan was introduced as the new Chrome head coach following legendary coach Dom Starsia's announcement that he would be transitioning to the league advisory board. Soudan arrives with a distinguished professional coaching career, including winning coach of the year in the MLL in 2014. He transitioned into coaching lacrosse after a 14-year career indoor, outdoor, and on the World Lacrosse Championship stage.
- Waterdogs Lacrosse Club – Andy Copelan became the Waterdogs Lacrosse Club's first head coach on January 2, 2020. He takes the reigns of an expansion franchise that will build its entire roster through an expansion draft, new player entry draft, and the collegiate draft. Copelan was hired based on his successful NCAA coaching resume. At the helm of Fairfield Stags men's lacrosse, Copelan led the team to the best team record under one head coach and was named MAAC coach of the year in 2015.

== Expansion ==
The addition of a seventh team, the Waterdogs Lacrosse Club, allows for natural bye weeks to occur for each team throughout the season. Paul Rabil first hinted at expansion in a post game interview after the 2019 Championship game. On January 1, 2020, the Premier Lacrosse League announced the Waterdogs identity. An expansion draft took place on February 12 and an entry draft will occur in March to build the new roster with veteran players.

== Original Schedule ==
Original 2020 PLL tour locations

Week	Venue	City	Ref.
1	Gillette Stadium	Foxborough, MA (Boston)	
2	Fifth Third Bank Stadium	Kennesaw, GA (Atlanta)	
3	Kenneth P. LaValle Stadium	Stony Brook, NY	
4	Homewood Field	Baltimore, MD	
5	Ford Center at The Star	Frisco, TX (Dallas)	
6	TCO Stadium	Eagan, MN (Minneapolis)	
PLL All-Star Game	Orange County Great Park	Irvine, CA (Los Angeles)	
8	Providence Park	Portland, OR	
9	WakeMed Soccer Park	Cary, NC (Raleigh)	
10	Tom & Mary Casey Stadium	Albany, NY	
11	Rio Tinto Stadium	Sandy, UT (Salt Lake City)	
12	Peter Barton Lacrosse Stadium	Denver, CO	

== Championship Series Schedule ==
Since this season was affected by COVID-19, it was called the PLL Championship Series. The season began on July 25 – August 9.

In their "quest for the crown," seven teams competed in the 14 Group Play games that determined playoff seeding leading into the Elimination Round. The remaining teams that were not eliminated moved onto the Semifinals, and lastly, the PLL Championship. All 20 games were played without fans at Zions Bank Stadium in Herriman, Utah and broadcast four games live on NBC, ten games on NBCSN, and live streamed on NBC Sports Gold.

Week	Date	Games	Time (ET)
1 (Group Play)	July 25	Whipsnakes 13–9 Redwoods	4:00 pm
1 (Group Play)	July 25	Chrome 13–9 Chaos	7:30 pm
2	July 26	Atlas 11–10 Waterdogs	4:00 pm
3	July 27	Archers 11–10 Atlas	9:30 pm
4	July 28	Waterdogs 7–9 Archers	7:00 pm
4	July 28	Redwoods 11–12 Chrome	9:30 pm
5	July 29	Chaos 7–8 Redwoods	7:00 pm
6	July 30	Atlas 6–15 Whipsnakes	7:00 pm
6	July 30	Archers 13–12 Chrome	9:30 pm
7	July 31	Chaos 7–12 Whipsnakes	7:00 pm
7	July 31	Chrome 13–12 Waterdogs	9:30 pm
8	August 1	Redwoods 11–10 Atlas	1:00 pm
8	August 1	Waterdogs 10–9 Chaos	3:30 pm
9	August 2	Whipsnakes 17–11 Archers	12:00 pm
10 (Elimination Games)	August 4	Chaos 19–14 Chrome	4:30 pm
10 (Elimination Games)	August 4	Waterdogs 8–11 Redwoods	7:00 pm
10 (Elimination Games)	August 4	Atlas 9–11 Archers	9:30 pm
11 (Semifinals)	August 6	Chaos 13–9 Archers	4:30 pm
11 (Semifinals)	August 6	Redwoods 12–13 Whipsnakes	7:00 pm
PLL Championship	August 9	Chaos 6–12 Whipsnakes	12:30 pm

=== Championship Series bracket ===
First Round
7	Chaos	19
2	Chrome	14
3	Archers	11
6	Atlas	9
Lower round 1
4	Redwoods	11
5	Waterdogs	8

Semi-Finals
7	Chaos	13
3	Archers	9
Lower final
1	Whipsnakes	13
4	Redwoods	12

Championship
7	Chaos
1	Whipsnakes

== Standings ==
2020 Premier Lacrosse League Standings
Team	W	L	PCT	GB	SF	SA	Diff
Whipsnakes	4	0	1.000	–	57	33	24
Chrome	3	1	.750	1	50	45	5
Archers	3	1	.750	1	44	46	-2
Redwoods	2	2	.500	2	39	42	-3
Waterdogs	1	3	.250	3	39	42	-3
Atlas	1	3	.250	3	37	47	-10
Chaos	0	4	.000	4	32	43	-11

Playoff Seed

== Expansion Draft ==
The 2020 expansion draft occurred on February 12 for the Waterdogs Lacrosse Club to build their initial roster. The original 6 Lacrosse Clubs submitted a roster of 11 protected players (1 goalie and 10 positional players) to the PLL. These 11 players were not available for selection by the seventh Lacrosse Club in the Expansion Draft. Any player, with the exception of active military members and rookie holdouts, not protected by their club was entered into the pool for selection by the Waterdogs.

Format:

- A total of 18 players were selected in the expansion draft
- No more than 4 players could be drafted from an existing Lacrosse Club
- Remaining non-protected players were removed from the expansion draft pool and returned to their original club

Pick #	Player	Pos.	PLL Team	College
1	Connor Kelly	Midfield	Whipsnakes	Maryland
2	Christian Cuccinello	Attack	Archers	Villanova
3	Brodie Merrill	Defense	Chaos	Georgetown
4	Charlie Cipriano	Goalie	Chaos	Fairfield
5	Ben Reeves	Attack	Whipsnakes	Yale
6	Kyle McClancy	Midfield	Chaos	Albany
7	Kieran McArdle	Attack	Atlas	St. John's
8	Brian Karalunas	Defense	Redwoods	Villanova
9	Ben McIntosh	Midfield	Archers	Drexel
10	Drew Snider	Midfield	Whipsnakes	Maryland
11	Ryan Drenner	Attack	Whipsnakes	Towson
12	Noah Richard	LSM	Atlas	Marquette
13	Steven DeNapoli	Midfield	Atlas	Hofstra
14	Wes Berg	Midfield	Redwoods	Denver
15	Chris Sabia	Defense	Chrome	Penn State
16	Ryan Conrad	Midfield	Atlas	Virginia
17	Dan Eipp	Midfield	Archers	Harvard
18	Drew Simoneau	Faceoff	Chrome	Nazareth

== Player Entry Draft ==
The 2020 player entry draft occurred on March 16 for teams to select players arriving from rival Major League Lacrosse. On March 4, Paul Burmeister and NBCSN hosted an entry draft lottery for selection order. Out of 100 balls to select from, Waterdogs had 40, Chrome had 25, Atlas had 15, Archers had 10, Chaos had 6, Redwoods had 3, and the champion Whipsnakes had 1.

Rob Pannell was announced to be transferring to the PLL on March 9, followed by 15 other players the following day, which comprised the selection pool for the entry draft. A total of 14 players were selected in the entry draft with remaining new players entering the league player pool.

Draft results
Rnd.	Pick #	PLL Team	Player	Pos.	College
1	1	Waterdogs	Zach Currier	Midfield	Princeton
1	2	Chrome	Jesse Bernhardt	Long Stick Midfield	Maryland
1	3	Atlas	Rob Pannell	Attack	Cornell
1	4	Archers	Eli Gobrecht	Defense	Ithaca
1	5	Whipsnakes	Zed Williams	Midfield	Virginia
1	6	Redwoods	Finn Sullivan	Defense	Hofstra
1	7	Chaos	Dillon Ward	Goalie	Bellarmine
2	8	Waterdogs	Ryland Rees	Long Stick Midfield	Stony Brook
2	9	Chrome	Donny Moss	Defense	Adelphi
2	10	Atlas	Craig Chick	Defense	Lehigh
2	11	Archers	Christian Mazzone	Midfield	Rutgers
2	12	Whipsnakes	TJ Comizio	Midfield	Villanova
2	13	Redwoods	Greg Puskuldjian	Faceoff	Adelphi
2	14	Chaos	Jason Noble	Midfield	Cornell

== College Draft ==
The 2020 collegiate draft occurred on May 13 after being reschedule due to COVID-19 concerns. The draft was broadcast on NBCSN and featured a condensed format. With many seniors choosing to return to school on an extra year of eligibility granted by the NCAA and the PLL season being condensed into a prime time tournament, the 2020 draft was conducted through two rounds. All previous draft pick trade rights from the past season were transferred to the 2021 draft.

Format:

- Each club is awarded two picks.
- Eligible players must have completed their senior season.

Rnd.	Pick #	PLL Team	Player	Pos.	College	Conference	Notes
1	1	Archers	Grant Ament	Attack	Penn State	Big Ten	
1	2	Atlas	Bryan Costabile	Midfield	Notre Dame	ACC	
1	3	Waterdogs	Michael Kraus	Attack	Virginia	ACC	Chose instead to play in Major League Lacrosse for the Connecticut Hammerheads
1	4	Chrome	Tom Rigney	Defense	Army	Patriot League	Chose instead to play in Major League Lacrosse for the Denver Outlaws
1	5	Chaos	Matt Gaudet	Attack	Yale	Ivy League	
1	6	Redwoods	Peyton Smith	Faceoff	Marist	MAAC	
1	7	Whipsnakes	Sean New	Defense	Holy Cross	Patriot League	
2	8	Waterdogs	Matt DeLuca	Goalie	Delaware	CAA	
2	9	Chrome	Reece Eddy	Defense	Boston	Patriot League	
2	10	Atlas	Aidan Hynes	Defense	Yale	Ivy League	
2	11	Archers	Jack Rapine	Defense	Johns Hopkins	Big Ten	
2	12	Chaos	Jeff Teat	Attack	Cornell	Ivy League	Chose to return to Cornell for a fifth season of eligibility
2	13	Redwoods	Chris Price	Defense	High Point	SoCon	
2	14	Whipsnakes	Matt Hubler	Midfield	Johns Hopkins	Big Ten	

== Championship ==
The top-ranked, undefeated and PLL defending champs, the Whipsnakes became the repeat champions when they won their second straight championship by winning against the low-seeded, but red-hot Chaos by a score of 12–6.

In the opening first three quarters, great defense by Chaos shutdown the Whipsnakes.

However, in the fourth quarter Chaos weren't able to stop the Whipsnakes as they went on a 10–0 run fueled by attackman Zed Williams, along with Matt Rambo assists.

Williams tied the PLL single-game record with 6 goals, scoring 5 in the fourth quarter alone and was named Tournament MVP.

== Ratings ==
This season's PLL Championship Game brought in a Total Audience Delivery (TAD) of 340,000 viewers on NBC, outperforming the 2019 Championship Game (276,000 viewers) by an impressive 23%.

All 14 combined broadcasts on NBC and NBCSN averaged 153,000 Total Viewers, an increase of 33% over the 2019 inaugural PLL season.

== Awards ==
Award	Recipient	Team	Position	Ref.
Jim Brown Most Valuable Player	Zed Williams	Whipsnakes	Attack	
Eamon McEneaney Attackman of the Championship Series	Zed Williams	Whipsnakes		
Gait Brothers Midfielder of the Championship Series	Tom Schreiber	Archers		
Dave Pietramala Defenseman of the Championship Series	Matt Dunn	Whipsnakes		
Oren Lyons Goalie Player of the Year	Blaze Riorden	Chaos		
Brodie Merrill Long Stick Midfielder of the Championship Series	Michael Ehrhardt	Whipsnakes		
PLL Rookie of the Year				
Dick Edell Coach of the Year				
Paul Cantabene Face Off Athlete of the Championship Series	Joe Nardella	Whipsnakes		
George Boiardi Hard Hat SSDM of the Championship Series	Ty Warner	Whipsnakes		
Welles Crowther Humanitarian Award				
Brendan Looney Leadership Award				
Jimmy Regan Teammate Award				
Dave Huntley Sportmanship Award Award				

=== All-Tournament Team ===
Attack: Zed Williams (Whipsnakes), Matt Rambo (Whipsnakes), Josh Byrne (Chaos)

Midfield: Tom Schreiber (Archers), Michael Ehrhardt (Whipsnakes), Joe Nardella (Whipsnakes)

Defense: Matt Dunn (Whipsnakes), Jack Rowlett (Chaos), Garrett Epple (Redwoods)

Goalie: Blaze Riorden (Chaos)
