= Justin Inacio =

Canadian professional lacrosse player

Personal information
- Nationality: Canadian
- Born: November 6, 1998 (age 27) Oakville, Ontario, Canada
- Height: 5 ft 10 in (178 cm)
- Weight: 188 lb (85 kg; 13 st 6 lb)
- Website: https://justininacio.webflow.io/

Sport
- Position: Defence (box), Faceoff specialist (field)
- Shoots: Right
- NCAA team: Ohio State (2022)
- NLL draft: 10th overall, 2021; Calgary Roughnecks
- NLL team: Calgary Roughnecks
- PLL team: Archers
- Pro career: 2022–

Career highlights
- PLL: 1x Champion (2023); 1x All-Star (2025); NCAA: Big Ten Freshman of the Year (2018); Big Ten Co-Specialist of the Year (2019); Second Team All-Big Ten (2019); 2x Honorable Mention All-American (2019, 2022)

Justin Inacio (born November 6, 1998) is a Canadian professional lacrosse player who plays as a faceoff specialist with the Carolina Chaos of the Premier Lacrosse League (PLL) and as a defenceman for the Calgary Roughnecks of the National Lacrosse League (NLL). He is also an assistant lacrosse coach at Ohio Wesleyan University.

Inacio played college lacrosse for the Ohio State Buckeyes.

== Early and personal life ==
Inacio was born and raised in Oakville, Ontario as the son of Nelson and Sandra Inacio. He has an older sister. Inacio began to play lacrosse at the age of 4, and would go on to attend The Hill Academy, where he played lacrosse for head coach Brodie Merrill. Although Canada rarely produces top faceoff specialists, Inacio was ranked as the top faceoff man in the class of 2017 and was an Under Armour All-American, earning a scholarship to play lacrosse at Ohio State University, becoming the first person in his family to attend college.

== College career ==
As a freshman in 2018, Inacio won 61.3% of his faceoffs, leading all freshmen in the nation, being named Big Ten Freshman of the Year. The following season, Inacio led the Big Ten in faceoff percentage and finished ninth nationally with a 63.7% win rate. Additionally, he set Ohio State single game records in faceoff wins (23) and ground balls (19), and finished fifth in the nation in ground balls per game with 10. During the covid shortened 2020 season, Inacio only appeared in four games, though he won 65.5% of his draws, and during a game against Cornell, he won 30 faceoffs, the third most in a single game in NCAA history. His numbers dipped in the 2021 season, only winning at a 55.1% rate, though Inacio bounced back as a fifth year, winning 59.2% of his draws while also scoring a career high 3 goals, being named an honorable mention All-American. Inacio graduated as Ohio State's all-time leader in ground balls with 357 and second in faceoff percentage at 60.7%. Inacio graduated with a degree in biology, as well as minoring in business.

== Professional career ==
=== NLL ===
Inacio was selected 10th overall in the 2021 NLL Entry Draft by the Calgary Roughnecks, though he opted to return to Ohio State for a fifth season. He was set to join the Roughnecks ahead of the 2022 season, however a knee injury forced him to miss the entire year.

=== PLL ===
Inacio was selected 18th overall by Archers Lacrosse Club in the 2022 PLL College Draft. He played eight games as a rookie, along with two playoff games, winning a total of 41.3% of his faceoffs.

== Statistics ==
=== NCAA ===
Season	Team	GP	G	A	Pts	GB	FOW	FOA
2018	Ohio State	14	0	1	1	47	130	212
2019	Ohio State	12	2	1	3	117	181	284
2020	Ohio State	4	1	0	1	29	72	110
2021	Ohio State	10	0	0	0	63	147	267
2022	Ohio State	16	3	1	4	101	200	338
Total		56	6	3	9	357	730	1211

=== NLL ===
Justin Inacio		Regular season									Playoffs								
Season	Team	GP	G	A	Pts	LB	PIM	Pts/GP	LB/GP	PIM/GP	GP	G	A	Pts	LB	PIM	Pts/GP	LB/GP	PIM/GP
2024	Calgary Roughnecks	8	0	2	2	40	2	0.25	5.00	0.25	–	–	–	–	–	–	–	–	–
2025	Calgary Roughnecks	18	2	1	3	156	29	0.17	8.67	1.61	1	0	0	0	8	0	0.00	8.00	0.00
2026	Calgary Roughnecks	18	4	1	5	162	17	0.28	9.00	0.94	–	–	–	–	–	–	–	–	–
		44	6	4	10	358	48	0.23	8.14	1.09	1	0	0	0	8	0	0.00	8.00	0.00
Career Total:		45	6	4	10	366	48	0.22	8.13	1.07									

GP–Games played; G–Goals; A–Assists; Pts–Points; LB–Loose balls; PIM–Penalty minutes; Pts/GP–Points per games played; LB/GP–Loose balls per games played; PIM/GP–Penalty minutes per games played.

=== PLL ===
Season	Team	Regular season											Playoffs										
Season	Team	GP	G	2PG	A	Pts	Sh	GB	Pen	PIM	FOW	FOA	GP	G	2PG	A	Pts	Sh	GB	Pen	PIM	FOW	FOA
2022	Archers	8	2	0	0	2	6	33	1	0.5	78	183	2	0	0	0	0	1	11	0	0	15	42
2025	Carolina Chaos	7	2	0	1	3	11	72	2	1	103	169	1	0	0	0	0	2	13	0	0	15	26
		15	4	0	1	5	17	105	3	1.5	181	352	3	0	0	0	0	3	24	0	0	30	68
Career total:		18	4	0	1	5	20	129	3	1.5	211	420											

GP–Games played; G–Goals; 2PG–2-point goals; A–Assists; Pts–Points; Sh–Shots; GB–Ground balls; Pen–Penalties; PIM–Penalty minutes; FOW–Faceoffs won; FOA–Faceoffs attempted
