= 2015 Big East men's lacrosse tournament =

American college lacrosse tournament

The 2015 Big East men's lacrosse tournament took place April 30 to May 2 at Villanova Stadium in Villanova, Pennsylvania. The winner of the tournament received the Big East Conference's automatic bid to the 2015 NCAA Division I Men's Lacrosse Championship. Four teams from the Big East conference will compete in the single elimination event. The seeds were based upon the teams' regular season conference record.

== Standings ==
Only the top four teams in the Big East conference advanced to the Big East Conference Tournament.

Seed	School	Conference	Overall
1	Denver‡*	5-0	13–2
2	Georgetown*	4–1	10–6
3	Marquette*	3–2	10–6
4	Villanova*	1–4	6–8
5	Providence	1-4	5-9
6	St. Johns	1–4	3-11
‡ Big East regular season champions. * Qualify for the tournament.

== Schedule ==
Session	Game	Time*	Matchup^{#}	Score	Television
Semi-finals – Thursday, April 30
1	1	4:30 pm	#2 Georgetown vs. #3 Marquette	12-8	BEDN
1	2	7:00 pm	#1 Denver vs. #4 Villanova	16-9	BEDN
Championship – Saturday, May 2
2	3	8:00pm	#1 Denver vs. #2 Georgetown	16-8	FOX Sports 2
*Game times in EST. #-Rankings denote tournament seeding.

== Bracket ==
Villanova Field – Villanova, Pennsylvania

Semifinals; April 30
1	Denver	16
4	Villanova	9
2	Georgetown	12
3	Marquette	8

Championship Game; May 2
1	Denver	16
2	Georgetown	8

Denver dominated Georgetown in front of over 500 fans to repeat as Big East Conference champions.

- denotes an overtime game

== All-Tournament ==
Johnny Gallaway, Villanova Jr., A

Danny Seibel, Villanova, Fr., A

Dan Mojica, Marquette, RS-Jr., D

Conor Gately, Marquette Jr., A

Craig Berge, Georgetown, Fr., M

Bo Stafford, Georgetown Sr., A

Nick Marrocco, Georgetown Sr., GK

Erik Adamson, Denver Sr., M

Trevor Baptiste, Denver, Fr., M/FOS

Wesley Berg, Denver Sr., A

Connor Cannizzaro, Denver, So., A

Most Outstanding Player Connor Cannizzaro, Denver, So., A

Most Outstanding Goalie Nick Marrocco, Georgetown Sr., GK
