= Utah Archers =

Field lacrosse team in the PLL

- Full name: Utah Archers
- Founded: 2019
- League: Premier Lacrosse League
- Team history: Archers Lacrosse Club (2019–23); Utah Archers (2024–present)
- Based in: Herriman, Utah
- Stadium: Zions Bank Stadium
- Colors
- Head coach: Chris Bates
- Championships: 2 (2023, 2024)
- Website: Utah Archers

The Utah Archers are a professional field lacrosse team based in the Salt Lake City metropolitan area that competes in the Premier Lacrosse League (PLL). The Archers are one of the six founding members of the PLL for the 2019 season. Notable players include Tom Schreiber, Grant Ament, and Graeme Hossack.

After an 8–2 season where they were the #1 seed and Tom Schreiber won MVP, they won the 2023 PLL championship, defeating the Waterdogs 15–14.

== Roster ==
2026 Utah Archers
#	Name	Nationality	Position	Shot	Height	Weight	College	Grad year	High school	Hometown	Ref.
1	Aidan O'Neil	(United States)	Attack	Left	6 ft 0 in	200 lbs	Richmond	2026	Tabor Academy	Centerville, Massachusetts	
2	CK Giancola	(United States)	Midfield	Right	6 ft 1 in	190 lbs	Wesleyan	2025	Trinity-Pawling	Fort Myers, Florida	
4	Leo Johnson	(United States)	Attack	R/L	5 ft 9 in	175 lbs	Maryland	2026	Avon Old Farms	Greenwich, Connecticut	
5	Connor Fields	(Canada)	Attack	Left	5 ft 11 in	180 lbs	Albany	2017	Bishop Timon – St. Jude	East Amherst, New York	
6	Ryan Stines	(United States)	Attack	Right	5 ft 11 in	190 lbs	Utah	2026	Panther Creek	Cary, North Carolina	
7	Mac O'Keefe	(United States)	Attack	Left	6 ft 0 in	190 lbs	Penn State	2021	Syosset	Syosset, New York	
9	Sam King	(United States)	Attack	R/L	5 ft 9 in	174 lbs	Harvard	2025	Gilman	Baltimore, Maryland	
11	Matt Moore	(United States)	Attack	Right	6 ft 2 in	195 lbs	Virginia	2022	Garnet Valley	Garnet Valley, Pennsylvania	
13	Ryan Ambler	(United States)	Midfield	Left	6 ft 2 in	200 lbs	Princeton	2016	Abington	Abington Township, Pennsylvania	
16	Grant Ament	(United States)	Midfield	R/L	5 ft 9 in	170 lbs	Penn State	2020	Haverford	Doylestown, Pennsylvania	
17	Mitchell Dunham	(Canada)	Defense	Left	6 ft 2 in	205 lbs	Richmond	2025	Everest Academy	Hamilton, Ontario	
18	Nick Washuta	(United States)	Goalie	Left	6 ft 3 in	215 lbs	Vermont	2020	The Blake School	Orono, Minnesota	
20	Cam Wyers	(Canada)	Defense	Left	6 ft 5 in	220 lbs	Loyola	2023	Everest Academy	Ottawa, Ontario	
21	Colin Sharkey	(United States)	SSDM	Right	6 ft 1 in	205 lbs	Maryland	2024	Archbishop Stepinac	Yonkers, New York	
22	Bryce Ford	(United States)	Midfield	R/L	5 ft 8in	190 lbs	Maryland	2025	John Jay	South Salem, New York	
23	Aidan Maguire	(United States)	SSDM	Left	6 ft 2 in	210 lbs	Duke	2026	St. Sebastian's	Hingham, Massachusetts	
24	Gannon Matthews**	(United States)	Attack	R/L	6 ft 0 in	185 lbs	Ohio State	2025	Eagle	Eagle, Idaho	
26	Tom Schreiber (C)	(United States)	Midfield	R/L	5 ft 11in	195 lbs	Princeton	2014	St. Anthony's	East Meadow, New York	
27	Warren Jeffrey	(Canada)	Defense	Left	6 ft 3in	225 lbs	Vermont	2019	St. Michael's College School	Mimico, Ontario	
31	Connor Maher	(United States)	SSDM	Left	6 ft 1in	187 lbs	North Carolina	2023	Calvert Hall	Timonium, Maryland	
40	Tommy Stull	(United States)	LSM	Right	5 ft 9 in	175 lbs	Richmond	2025	Deerfield Academy	Niantic, Connecticut	
44	Tre Leclaire	(Canada)	Midfield	Right	6 ft 2in	205 lbs	Ohio State	2021	Elgin Park	Surrey, British Columbia	
45	Brett Dobson	(Canada)	Goalie	Right	6 ft 2in	200 lbs	St. Bonaventure	2022	The Hill Academy	Oshawa, Ontario	
46	Brendan Lavelle	(United States)	Defense	Right	6 ft 0in	210 lbs	Penn	2025	Rye	Rye, New York	
54	Piper Bond	(United States)	SSDM	Right	6 ft 2in	200 lbs	Penn	2023	Gilman	Baltimore, Maryland	
77	Mason Woodward	(United States)	LSM	Left	6 ft 2in	210 lbs	Marquette	2024	St. Paul's	Towson, Maryland	
89	Beau Pederson	(United States)	SSDM	Right	6 ft 4in	210 lbs	Michigan	2024	Park City	Park City, Utah	
99	Mike Sisselberger	(United States)	Faceoff	Right	5 ft 9in	200 lbs	Lehigh	2023	Southern Lehigh	Center Valley, Pennsylvania	
	Nikko DiPonio	(United States)	Defense	Left	5 ft 11 in	190 lbs	Utah	2026	Culver	Bloomfield Hills, Michigan	

**Indicates player is on PUP list Source:

(C): Captain

=== Coaching staff ===
- Head coach – Chris Bates
- Assistant coach – Tony Resch
- Assistant coach – Brian Kavanagh

== All-time draft selections ==
2019 College Draft

Rnd.	Pick #	Player	Pos.	College	Conf.	2019 accolades
1	1	Pat Spencer	Attack	Loyola	Patriot League	Tewaaraton Award winner, First-Team All-American, Patriot League Offensive Player of the Year, First-Team Patriot League *Note* (Spencer will spend the 2019–2020 season playing men's Division 1 basketball for Northwestern. He elected to pursue a professional basketball career rather than lacrosse.)
2	12	Curtis Corley	Defense	Maryland	Big Ten Conference	Third-Team All-American, First-Team Big Ten
3	13	Colton Jackson	Midfield	Denver	Big East Conference	Honorable Mention All-American, Second-Team Big East: *Note* (Jackson chose to play in the MLL for the Atlanta Blaze who drafted him with the 26th pick in the 2019 draft)
4	24	John Prendergast	Midfield	Duke	Atlantic Coast Conference	Honorable Mention All-American, First-Team ACC: *Note* (Prendergast was designated to the Player Pool [Free Agent] on June 12, 2019)

2020 Entry Draft

The 2020 player entry draft occurred on March 16 for teams to select players arriving from rival Major League Lacrosse. On March 4, Paul Burmeister and NBCSN hosted an entry draft lottery for selection order. Out of 100 balls to select from, Waterdogs had 40, Chrome had 25, Atlas had 15, Archers had 10, Chaos had 6, Redwoods had 3, and the champion Whipsnakes had 1.

Rob Pannell was announced to be transferring to the PLL on March 9, followed by 15 other players the following day, which comprised the selection pool for the entry draft. A total of 14 players were selected in the entry draft with remaining new players entering the league player pool.

Draft results
Rnd.	Pick #	Player	Pos.	College
1	4	Eli Gobrecht	Defense	Ithaca
2	11	Christian Mazzone	Midfield	Rutgers

2020 College Draft

Rnd.	Pick #	Player	Pos.	College	2020 Accolades
1	1	Grant Ament	Attack	Penn State	First-team All-American
2	11	Jack Rapine	Defense	Johns Hopkins	

2021 Entry Draft

Rnd.	Pick #	Player	Pos.	College
1	2	Graeme Hossack	Defense	Lindenwood
2	10	Ryan McNamara	Midfield	Marquette
3	18	Warren Jeffrey	Defense	Vermont

2021 College Draft

Rnd.	Pick #	Player	Pos.	College
1	5	Jared Conners	Lonf Stick Midfield	Virginia
2	13	Tre Leclaire	Midfield	Ohio State
3	18	Jeff Trainor	Midfield	UMass
3	21	Conor Gaffney	Faceoff	Lehigh

2022 College Draft

Rnd.	Pick #	Player	Pos.	College
1	4	Matt Moore	Attack	Virginia
2	12	Brett Dobson	Goalie	St. Bonaventure
3	18	Justin Inacio	Faceoff	Ohio State
4	28	Jon Robbins	Long Stick Midfield	Bellarmine
4	29	Ryan Aughavin	Midfield	Brown

2023 College Draft

Rnd.	Pick #	Player	Pos.	College
1	5	Mike Sisselberger	Faceoff	Lehigh
2	13	Connor Maher	Defensive Midfield	North Carolina
3	21	Piper Bond	Defensive Midfield	Penn
4	29	Cameron Wyers	Defense	Loyola

2024 College Draft

Rnd.	Pick #	Player	Pos.	College
1	8	Mason Woodward	Defense	Marquette
2	13	Beau Pederson	Defensive Midfield	Michigan
2	16	Dyson Williams	Attack	Duke
3	24	Colby Barsz	Defense	Towson

2025 College Draft

Rnd.	Pick #	Player	Pos.	College
1	5	Brendan Lavelle	Defense	Penn
3	18	Sam King	Midfield	Harvard
3	21	Mitchell Dunham	Defense	Richmond
4	32	Bryce Ford	Midfield	Maryland

2026 College Draft

Rnd.	Pick #	Player	Pos.	College
1	1	Aidan Maguire	SSDM	Duke
2	9	Ryan Stines	Attack	Utah
3	17	Will Schaller	Defense	Maryland
4	25	Leo Johnson	Attack	Maryland

== Season results ==
2019
Week	Location	Date	Opponent	Result
1	Boston, Massachusetts	June 1, 2019	Chrome	W 13–12 (OT)
2	New York, New York	June 8, 2019	Redwoods	W 10–9
3	Chicago, Illinois	June 15, 2019	Whipsnakes	L 10–11 (OT)
4	Baltimore, Maryland	June 23, 2019	Chaos	L 13–14
5	Atlanta, Georgia	June 28, 2019	Atlas	L 12–13
6	Washington, DC	July 6, 2019	Redwoods	L 8–9 (OT)
All-Star Break	Los Angeles, California	July 21, 2019	Bye	Bye
7	Denver, Colorado	July 28, 2019	Chrome	W 9–7
8	San Jose, California	August 11, 2019	Atlas	W 15–11
9	Hamilton, Ontario	August 17, 2019	Chaos	L 10–11 (OT)
10	Albany, New York	August 25, 2019	Whipsnakes	W 11–8
Playoffs Round 1	Columbus, Ohio	September 6–7, 2019	Redwoods	L 12–16
Playoffs Round 2	New York, New York	September 14, 2019	Chrome	W 12–10
First Draft Pick Game	Philadelphia, Pennsylvania	September 21, 2019	Atlas	W 25–7

2020
Game	Location	Date	Opponent	Result
1	Herriman, Utah	July 27, 2020	Atlas	W 11–10
2	Herriman, Utah	July 28, 2020	Waterdogs	W 9–7
3	Herriman, Utah	July 30, 2020	Chrome	W 13–12
4	Herriman, Utah	August 2, 2020	Whipsnakes	L 11–17
5 (Elimination)	Herriman, Utah	August 4, 2020	Atlas	W 11–9
6 (Semifinal)	Herriman, Utah	August 6, 2020	Chaos	L 9–13

2021
Game	Location	Date	Opponent	Result
1	Foxborough, Massachusetts	June 5, 2021	Atlas	W 18–6
2	Kennesaw, Georgia	June 13, 2021	Chaos	W 12–8
3	Baltimore, Maryland	June 26, 2021	Waterdogs	W 17–8
4	Hempstead, New York	July 2, 2021	Chrome	L 7–8
5	Hempstead, New York	July 4, 2021	Whipsnakes	L 14–15
6	Eagan, Minnesota	July 11, 2021	Cannons	L 12–13
7	Colorado Springs, Colorado	July 31, 2021	Redwoods	W 15–12
8	Albany, New York	August 13, 2021	Chaos	L 9–11
9	Albany, New York	August 14, 2021	Whipsnakes	W 15–14
10 (Quarterfinal)	Sandy, Utah	September 5, 2021	Chaos	L 10–13

2022
Game	Location	Date	Opponent	Result
1	Albany, New York	June 5	Chrome	L 10–11
2	Charlotte, North Carolina	June 10	Chaos	W 17–12
3	Hempstead, New York	June 18	Cannons	W 20–9
4	Baltimore, Maryland	June 25	Atlas	L 12–11
5	Eagan, Minnesota	July 1	Redwoods	W 10–9
6	Fairfield, Connecticut	July 24	Cannons	W 17–12
7	Frisco, Texas	July 30	Atlas	L 9–14
8	Denver, Colorado	August 6	Whipsnakes	L 8–16
9	Herriman, Utah	August 13	Atlas	W 11–8
10	Tacoma, Washington	August 20	Waterdogs	W 16–12
11 (Quarterfinal)	Foxborough, Massachusetts	September 3	Redwoods	W 13–8
12 (Semifinal)	Washington D.C.	September 11	Chaos	L 7–9

2023 Championship Series
Game	Location	Date	Opponent	Result
1	Springfield, VA	February 22	Chrome	W 23–22 (OT)
2	Springfield, VA	February 23	Whipsnakes	W 26–23
3	Springfield, VA	February 24	Atlas	L 26–31
4 (Semifinals)	Springfield, VA	February 25	Chrome	L 18–21

2023
Game	Location	Date	Opponent	Result
1	Albany, New York	June 3	Cannons	W 16–13
2	Charlotte, North Carolina	June 9	Chrome	W 12–7
3	Columbus, Ohio	June 17	Chaos	L 10–15
4	Eagan, Minnesota	July 9	Whipsnakes	W 15–12
5	Fairfield, Connecticut	July 14	Redwoods	W 10–3
6	Frisco, Texas	July 30	Waterdogs	W 19–18
7	Baltimore, Maryland	August 5	Atlas	W 14–13 (OT)
8	Denver, Colorado	August 11	Chrome	W 13–5
9	Tacoma, Washington	August 18	Whipsnakes	W 16–11
10	Herriman, Utah	August 25	Waterdogs	L 13–14
11 (Semifinal)	Uniondale, New York	September 10	Redwoods	W 14–6
12 (Championship)	Chester, Pennsylvania	September 24	Waterdogs	W 15–14

2024 Championship Series
Game	Location	Date	Opponent	Result
1	Springfield, VA	February 15	Waterdogs	L 18–21
2	Springfield, VA	February 16	Cannons	L 19–26
3	Springfield, VA	February 17	Redwoods	L 16–18
4 (Semifinals)	Springfield, VA	February 18	Waterdogs	L 21–27

2024
Game	Location	Date	Opponent	Result
1	Albany, New York	June 1	Waterdogs	W 12–11
2	Charlotte, North Carolina	June 7	Outlaws	L 17–18 (OT)
3	Villanova, Pennsylvania	June 15	Chaos	W 9–7
4	Eagan, Minnesota	June 28	Cannons	L 9–14
5	Cambridge, Massachusetts	July 6	Whipsnakes	W 16–11
6	Fairfield, Connecticut	July 20	Redwoods	W 15–8
7	Baltimore, Maryland	August 4	Chaos	L 14–15
8	Denver, Colorado	August 10	Atlas	L 11–15
9	Herriman, Utah	August 16	Redwoods	W 13–12
10	Herriman, Utah	August 17	Outlaws	W 13–9
11 (Semifinal)	Uniondale, New York	September 7	Chaos	W 10–1
12 (Championship)	Chester, Pennsylvania	September 15	Whipsnakes	W 12–8

2025 Championship Series
Game	Location	Date	Opponent	Result
1	Springfield, VA	February 12	Cannons	W 29–21
2	Springfield, VA	February 14	Atlas	W 23–20
3	Springfield, VA	February 15	Whipsnakes	W 29–25
4 (Championship)	Springfield, VA	February 17	Cannons	L 14–21

== PLL award winners ==
Jim Brown Most Valuable Player

- Tom Schreiber: 2023

Eamon McEneaney Attackman of the Year

- Grant Ament: 2021

Gait Brothers Midfielder of the Year

- Tom Schreiber: 2019, 2020, 2022, 2023, 2024

Dave Pietramala Defensive Player of the Year

- Graeme Hossack: 2021
- Brendan Lavelle: 2026

George Boiardi Short Stick Midfielder of the Year

- Dominique Alexander: 2019
- Latrell Harris: 2023

Oren Lyons Goalie of the Year

- Brett Dobson: 2026

Jimmy Regan Teammate of the Year

- Ryan Ambler: 2024

Brendan Looney Leadership Award

- Tom Schreiber: 2023, 2024

Welles Crowther Humanitarian Award

- Scott Ratliff: 2019
- Mason Woodward: 2026

== Head coaches ==
#	Name	Term	Regular season				Playoffs			
#	Name	Term	GP	W	L	Pct	GP	W	L	Pct
1	Chris Bates	2019–	53	33	20	.623	11	7	4	.636

== All-time record vs. PLL Clubs ==
Opponent	Won	Lost	Percentage	Streak
Atlas	7	4	.636	Lost 1
Cannons	3	2	.600	Lost 1
Chaos	4	8	.333	Won 1
Outlaws	7	3	.700	Won 2
Redwoods	8	2	.800	Won 7
Waterdogs	6	1	.857	Won 2
Whipsnakes	5	4	.556	Won 4
Totals	39	23	.629	
