= Brett Dobson =

Canadian lacrosse player

Personal information
- Nationality: Canadian
- Born: April 3, 2000 (age 26) Oshawa, Ontario
- Height: 6 ft 2 in (188 cm)
- Weight: 200 lb (91 kg; 14 st 4 lb)

Sport
- Position: Goaltender
- Shoots: Right
- NCAA team: St. Bonaventure (2022)
- NLL draft: 11th Overall, 2022; Georgia Swarm
- NLL team: Georgia Swarm
- PLL team: Utah Archers
- Pro career: 2022–

Career highlights
- NCAA: MAAC Defensive Player of the Year (2022); Second Team All-American (2022); NLL: MVP (2026); Goaltender of the Year (2026); First Team All-NLL (2026); All-Rookie Team (2023); PLL: 2x Champion (2023, 2024); 2x Championship MVP (2023, 2024); Oren Lyons Goalie of the Year (2026); First Team All-Pro (2026); 2x Second Team All-Pro (2023,2024); 4x All-Star (2023-2026)
Medal record
Representing Canada
Men's field lacrosse
World Lacrosse Championship
| Runner-up | 2023 San Diego |
Men's lacrosse sixes
World Games
| Winner | 2022 Birmingham |
Men's box lacrosse
World Lacrosse Box Championships
| Winner | 2024 Utica |

Brett Dobson (born April 3, 2000) is a Canadian professional lacrosse goaltender for the Utah Archers of the Premier Lacrosse League, and as well for the Georgia Swarm of the National Lacrosse League. He is also a member of the Canada men's national lacrosse team. He represented Team Canada at the 2022 World Games Championship in Birmingham, Alabama, winning the gold medal.

== Early life and career ==
Dobson is the son of Heather and Richard Dobson and has a younger sister, Kylea who plays lacrosse at The University of Louisville. Dobson was diagnosed with type 1 diabetes in his childhood, and transitioned to goaltender to help manage his condition while still playing lacrosse. Dobson attended The Hill Academy for 3 Seasons as well as playing Junior A Lacrosse for the Whitby Warriors, where he would spend 5 seasons. Dobson was only able to compete in 4 seasons due to the COVID-19 Pandemic.

== Collegiate career ==
Dobson arrived on the campus of St. Bonaventure University in the fall of 2018, as the first recruit in program history with Inside Lacrosse ranking him the 12th goalie in his class. With the program beginning from scratch, Dobson was able to start all 4 years and leave his mark on the program, holding school records for the Most Saves in A Single Season (252 Saves), Highest Save Percentage in A Single Season (66.5%), and Most Saves in A Single Game (27) to name a few. In his senior year, Dobson was the 2022 MAAC Defensive Player of The Year, 2nd Team All American by Inside Lacrosse & USA Lacrosse Magazine, 3rd Team All American per USILA, Was named to the Tewaaraton Award Watch List, and led the entire Nation in Save Percentage. With the COVID-19 Pandemic hitting in 2020, all spring athletes were granted an extra year of eligibility. Following Dobson's Senior Season, he decided to forgo his 5th year of eligibility and entire his name into the 2022 PLL Draft.

== PLL career ==
Dobson, was selected 12th overall to the Archers Lacrosse Club in the 2022 PLL Entry Draft, where he was the first goalie taken off the board, becoming the first ever St. Bonaventure player to be selected in a professional lacrosse draft. In his first season with the Archers, he started one game against the number 1 seeded Whipsnakes where he posted a 52% Save Percentage, Collecting 14 saves and giving up 13 goals in a losing effort in his first professional start in the PLL.

In Dobson's first season as a starter, he led Archers to an 8–2 record, the best in the regular season, and he was a finalist for the Oren Lyons Goalie of the Year Award. Archers would eventually win the PLL Championship with Dobson being named Championship MVP having stopped 18 of 31 shots in the final.

== NLL career ==
Dobson was selected 11th Overall to the Georgia Swarm in the 2022 NLL Entry Draft, where he was the first goalie taken off the board. Dobson was the runner up for the NLL Rookie of the Year Award in 2023 and was named to the All-Rookie team. During his first season in the NLL, Dobson played in all 18 games, earning the starting job for four games in Buffalo (01/14/23). The rookie ended the year with 555 saves, a .78 save percentage, and a 10.69 goals against average after logging 881:04 minutes in net.

In the 2026 season, Dobson was named NLL MVP, having set league records in both save percentage and goals against average.

== Statistics ==
=== NCAA ===
| Team | Season | GP | GS | Min. | Saves | Sv% | GAA |
|---|---|---|---|---|---|---|---|
| St. Bonaventure | 2019 | 11 | 7 | 396:27 | 118 | 0.557 | 14.24 |
| St. Bonaventure | 2020 | 5 | 5 | 257:12 | 63 | 0.488 | 15.41 |
| St. Bonaventure | 2021 | 10 | 10 | 599:43 | 136 | 0.599 | 9.10 |
| St. Bonaventure | 2022 | 15 | 15 | 851:04 | 252 | 0.665 | 8.95 |
| Total | | 41 | 37 | 2104:26 | 569 | 0.601 | 10.78 |

=== NLL ===
| Brett Dobson | | Regular Season | | | | | | | | Playoffs | | | | | | | |
| Season | Team | GP | Min | W | L | GA | GAA | Sv | Sv % | GP | Min | W | L | GA | GAA | Sv | Sv % |
|---|---|---|---|---|---|---|---|---|---|---|---|---|---|---|---|---|---|
| 2023 | Georgia Swarm | 18 | 881:04 | 8 | 7 | 157 | 10.69 | 555 | 0.779 | – | – | – | – | – | – | – | – |
| 2024 | Georgia Swarm | 18 | 992:37 | 10 | 7 | 185 | 11.18 | 658 | 0.781 | 1 | 64:01 | 0 | 1 | 10 | 9.37 | 49 | 0.831 |
| 2025 | Georgia Swarm | 18 | 1,025:31 | 9 | 8 | 202 | 11.82 | 652 | 0.763 | 1 | 59:58 | 0 | 1 | 11 | 11.01 | 47 | 0.810 |
| 2026 | Georgia Swarm | 18 | 1,022:45 | 11 | 6 | 134 | 7.86 | 742 | 0.847 | 4 | 235:42 | 2 | 2 | 44 | 11.20 | 176 | 0.800 |
| | | 72 | 3,921:57 | 38 | 28 | 678 | 10.37 | 2,607 | 0.794 | 6 | 359:41 | 2 | 4 | 65 | 10.84 | 272 | 0.807 |
| Career Total: | | 78 | 4,281:38 | 40 | 32 | 743 | 10.41 | 2,879 | 0.795 | | | | | | | | |

GP–Games played;Min–Minutes played;W–Wins;L–Losses;GA–Goals against;GAA–Goals against average;Sv–Number of saves;Sv %–Save percentage;

=== PLL ===
| Regular Season | | | | | | | | | | Playoffs | | | | | | | |
| Team | Season | GP | Saves | Sv% | SAA | SA | GA | 2ptGA | PPGA | GP | Saves | Sv% | SAA | SA | GA | 2ptGA | PPGA |
|---|---|---|---|---|---|---|---|---|---|---|---|---|---|---|---|---|---|
| Utah Archers | 2022 | 1 | 14 | 51.9% | 13 | 13 | 13 | 0 | 1 | - | - | - | - | - | - | - | - |
| Utah Archers | 2023 | 10 | 123 | 58% | 10.4 | 96 | 89 | 7 | 8 | 2 | 36 | 66.7% | 10 | 20 | 18 | 2 | 3 |
| Utah Archers | 2024 | 10 | 147 | 57.2% | 11.8 | 120 | 110 | 10 | 15 | 2 | 38 | 80.9% | 4.5 | 9 | 9 | 0 | 0 |
| Utah Archers | 2025 | 10 | 146 | 59.1% | 11.1 | 111 | 101 | 10 | 7 | - | - | - | - | - | - | - | - |
| Utah Archers | 2026 | 10 | 131 | 59% | 9.7 | 96 | 91 | 5 | 10 | 1 | 17 | 65.4% | 11 | 11 | 9 | 2 | 1 |
| Total | | 8.2 | 112.2 | 58.1% | 11.2 | 87.2 | 80.8 | 6.4 | 8.2 | 1.7 | 30.3 | 71.7% | 8.5 | 13.3 | 12 | 1.3 | 1.3 |

== International career ==
Dobson made his international debut at the 2022 World Games, helping Canada win the gold medal. He backed up idol and mentor Dillon Ward in the 2023 World Lacrosse Championships, winning a silver medal.
