= Graeme Hossack =

Canadian lacrosse player (born 1992)

Personal information
- Nickname: Cyborg
- Nationality: Canadian
- Born: July 22, 1992 (age 34) Port Perry, Ontario
- Height: 6 ft 2 in (188 cm)
- Weight: 230 lb (100 kg; 16 st 6 lb)

Sport
- Position: Defense
- Shoots: Left
- NCAA team: Lindenwood (2015)
- NLL draft: 2nd overall, 2015; Rochester Knighthawks
- NLL team Former teams: Halifax Thunderbirds; Rochester Knighthawks
- MLL teams: Atlanta Blaze
- PLL team: Archers Lacrosse Club
- Pro career: 2016–

Career highlights
- NCAA: First Team All-American (2015); 2x ECAC Specialist of the Year (2014–15); 3x First Team All-ECAC (2013–15); NLL: 3x Defensive Player of the Year (2018–20); 4x First Team All-League (2018–20, 2023); 1x Second Team All-League (2017); All-Rookie Team (2016); PLL: 2x Champion (2023, 2024); 1x Dave Pietramala Defensive Player of the Year (2021); 2x All-Star (2021, 2022); 3x First Team All-Pro (2021, 2023, 2025); 1x Second Team All-Pro (2022); International: 3x All-World Team (2018, 2019, 2023)
Medal record
Representing Canada
Field lacrosse
World Lacrosse Championship
Runner-up	2018 Netanya
Runner-up	2023 San Diego
Box lacrosse
World Indoor Lacrosse Championship
Winner	2019 Langley
Winner	2024 Utica

Graeme Hossack (born July 22, 1992) is a Canadian professional lacrosse player who plays defense for the Halifax Thunderbirds of the National Lacrosse League (NLL) and Archers Lacrosse Club of the Premier Lacrosse League (PLL). In 2020, Hossack became the second player to be named the NLL Defensive Player of the Year for three consecutive years after Kyle Rubisch won four straight from 2012 to 2015.

== College and junior career ==
Hossack played for the Whitby Warriors of the Ontario Junior Lacrosse League, where he won the Minto Cup in 2011 and 2013.

Hossack attended Lindenwood University where he played four seasons of Division II lacrosse as an LSM. He was a three-time First Team all-ECAC player, two-time ECAC Specialist of the Year and, as a senior, he became Lindenwood's first ever First Team All-American. He majored in environmental biology.

== Professional career ==
=== NLL ===
Hossack was selected second overall in the 2015 NLL Draft by the Rochester Knighthawks. He made his professional debut on January 9, 2016, where he scored twice. He finished the season second among rookies with 91 loose balls and was named to the All-Rookie team. In his second season, Hossack was a finalist for the NLL Defensive Player of the Year Award and was named All-League Second Team. He then won the Defensive Player of the Year and first team All-League for the first time the following two seasons. Ahead of the 2020 season, the Knighthawks moved to Halifax, being rebranded as the Halifax Thunderbirds. Hossack continued his dominance, once again winning the Defensive Player of the Year Award and being named First Team All-League. In September 2021, The Thunderbirds re-signed Hossack to a five-year contract.

Heading into the 2023 NLL season, Inside Lacrosse named Hossack the #5 best defender in the NLL.

Hossack was the runner-up for the 2023 NLL Defensive Player of the Year Award and was named first team all-NLL.

=== MLL ===
Hossack played 3 seasons in Major League Lacrosse for the Atlanta Blaze.

=== PLL ===
Hossack decided to enter the Premier Lacrosse League Entry Draft in 2021, having not played professional field lacrosse since 2018. He was selected second overall by Archers Lacrosse Club. As a close defenseman, Hossack was named an All-Star, and at the end of his first PLL season, was named the Dave Pietramala Defensive Player of the Year.

At the 2025 PLL All-Star Game, Hossack set a PLL record for the fastest recorded shot at 123 miles per hour.

== International career ==
Hossack has represented Canada in the 2018 World Lacrosse Championship and the 2019 World Indoor Lacrosse Championship, being named to the All-World Team both times.

== Career statistics ==
=== College ===
Season	GP	GS	G	A	Pts	GB	CT	FO
2012	15	4	6	3	9	94	25	0-0
2013	13	9	9	3	12	115	37	0-0
2014	12	9	2	6	8	90	41	8–17
2015	18	16	16	6	22	153	42	5–10
Total	58	38	33	18	51	452	145	13–27

=== NLL ===
Graeme Hossack		Regular season									Playoffs								
Season	Team	GP	G	A	Pts	LB	PIM	Pts/GP	LB/GP	PIM/GP	GP	G	A	Pts	LB	PIM	Pts/GP	LB/GP	PIM/GP
2016	Rochester Knighthawks	18	2	3	5	91	9	0.28	5.06	0.50	–	–	–	–	–	–	–	–	–
2017	Rochester Knighthawks	18	6	4	10	125	6	0.56	6.94	0.33	–	–	–	–	–	–	–	–	–
2018	Rochester Knighthawks	18	7	7	14	163	8	0.78	9.06	0.44	5	4	1	5	50	0	1.00	10.00	0.00
2019	Rochester Knighthawks	18	8	16	24	164	12	1.33	9.11	0.67	–	–	–	–	–	–	–	–	–
2020	Halifax Thunderbirds	12	9	9	18	105	7	1.50	8.75	0.58	–	–	–	–	–	–	–	–	–
2022	Halifax Thunderbirds	18	3	12	15	129	8	0.83	7.17	0.44	1	0	0	0	3	0	0.00	3.00	0.00
2023	Halifax Thunderbirds	18	2	7	9	139	8	0.50	7.72	0.44	1	1	0	1	9	2	1.00	9.00	2.00
2024	Halifax Thunderbirds	18	5	12	17	119	16	0.94	6.61	0.89	1	0	0	0	3	2	0.00	3.00	2.00
2025	Halifax Thunderbirds	18	5	16	21	151	14	1.17	8.39	0.78	3	0	0	0	19	0	0.00	6.33	0.00
2026	Halifax Thunderbirds	18	4	10	14	132	24	0.78	7.33	1.33	6	0	2	2	42	6	0.33	7.00	1.00
		174	51	96	147	1,318	112	0.84	7.57	0.64	17	5	3	8	126	10	0.47	7.41	0.59
Career Total:		191	56	99	155	1,444	122	0.81	7.56	0.64									

GP–Games played; G–Goals; A–Assists; Pts–Points; LB–Loose balls; PIM–Penalty minutes; Pts/GP–Points per games played; LB/GP–Loose balls per games played; PIM/GP–Penalty minutes per games played.

=== MLL ===
Season	Team	Regular season											Playoffs										
Season	Team	GP	G	2PG	A	Pts	Sh	GB	Pen	PIM	FOW	FOA	GP	G	2PG	A	Pts	Sh	GB	Pen	PIM	FOW	FOA
2016	Atlanta Blaze	12	0	0	1	1	1	46	0	3	0	0	–	–	–	–	–	–	–	–	–	–	–
2017	Atlanta Blaze	11	1	1	1	3	10	37	0	4	0	1	–	–	–	–	–	–	–	–	–	–	–
2018	Atlanta Blaze	6	1	0	0	1	1	7	0	0	0	0	–	–	–	–	–	–	–	–	–	–	–
		29	2	1	2	5	12	90	0	7	0	1	0	0	0	0	0	0	0	0	0	0	0
Career total:		29	2	1	2	5	12	90	0	7	0	1											

GP–Games played; G–Goals; 2PG–2-point goals; A–Assists; Pts–Points; Sh–Shots; GB–Ground balls; Pen–Penalties; PIM–Penalty minutes; FOW–Faceoffs won; FOA–Faceoffs attempted

=== PLL ===
Season	Team	Regular season											Playoffs										
Season	Team	GP	G	2PG	A	Pts	Sh	GB	Pen	PIM	FOW	FOA	GP	G	2PG	A	Pts	Sh	GB	Pen	PIM	FOW	FOA
2021	Archers LC	9	0	0	0	0	5	28	1	1	5	15	1	0	0	0	0	1	5	0	0	0	3
2022	Archers LC	10	0	0	0	0	3	38	5	4	5	30	2	0	0	0	0	0	5	0	0	2	3
2023	Archers LC	10	0	0	1	1	3	35	4	3.5	3	16	2	0	0	0	0	1	6	2	1.5	1	1
2024	Utah Archers	7	0	0	0	0	2	20	2	2	0	0	2	1	1	0	2	1	4	0	0	0	0
2025	Utah Archers	10	1	0	0	1	8	24	2	2	0	0	–	–	–	–	–	–	–	–	–	–	–
		46	1	0	1	2	21	145	14	12.5	13	61	7	1	1	0	2	3	20	2	1.5	3	7
Career total:		53	2	1	1	4	24	165	16	14	16	68											

GP–Games played; G–Goals; 2PG–2-point goals; A–Assists; Pts–Points; Sh–Shots; GB–Ground balls; Pen–Penalties; PIM–Penalty minutes; FOW–Faceoffs won; FOA–Faceoffs attempted
