= Utah Utes men's lacrosse =

- Founded: 2019 (Varsity)
- University: University of Utah
- Head coach: Andrew McMinn
- Stadium: New Ute Field (capacity: 2,500)
- Location: Salt Lake City, Utah
- Conference: ASUN
- Nickname: Utes
- Colors: Red and white

NCAA Tournament appearances
- 2023, 2024

Conference Tournament championships
- 2023, 2024

Conference regular season championships
- 2022, 2023, 2024, 2025, 2026

The Utah Utes men's lacrosse team represents the University of Utah in National Collegiate Athletic Association (NCAA) Division I college lacrosse. The program was upgraded to varsity in 2019, previously competing as a club team in the Men's Collegiate Lacrosse Association (MCLA). The Utes are one of four current NCAA Division I men's lacrosse teams west of the Mississippi River, along with Air Force, Denver, and Lindenwood. Utah plays its home games at the Ute Soccer Field, which has a capacity of 2,500. The Utes competed as an independent from their inaugural season of play in 2019 until joining the ASUN Conference as a single-sport member after the 2021 season. Through 2024, the team has an all–time record of 46-34.

The westernmost team in NCAA Division I men's lacrosse by 400 miles, Utah played its first varsity game against Vermont, losing 21–6. Jimmy Perkins scored the program's first goal in front of 3,215 fans in Utah Football's Rice–Eccles Stadium. Led by seven goals by Josh Stout in the following game, the Utes secured their first win in program history, defeating the Mercer Bears 13–9 in Salt Lake City.

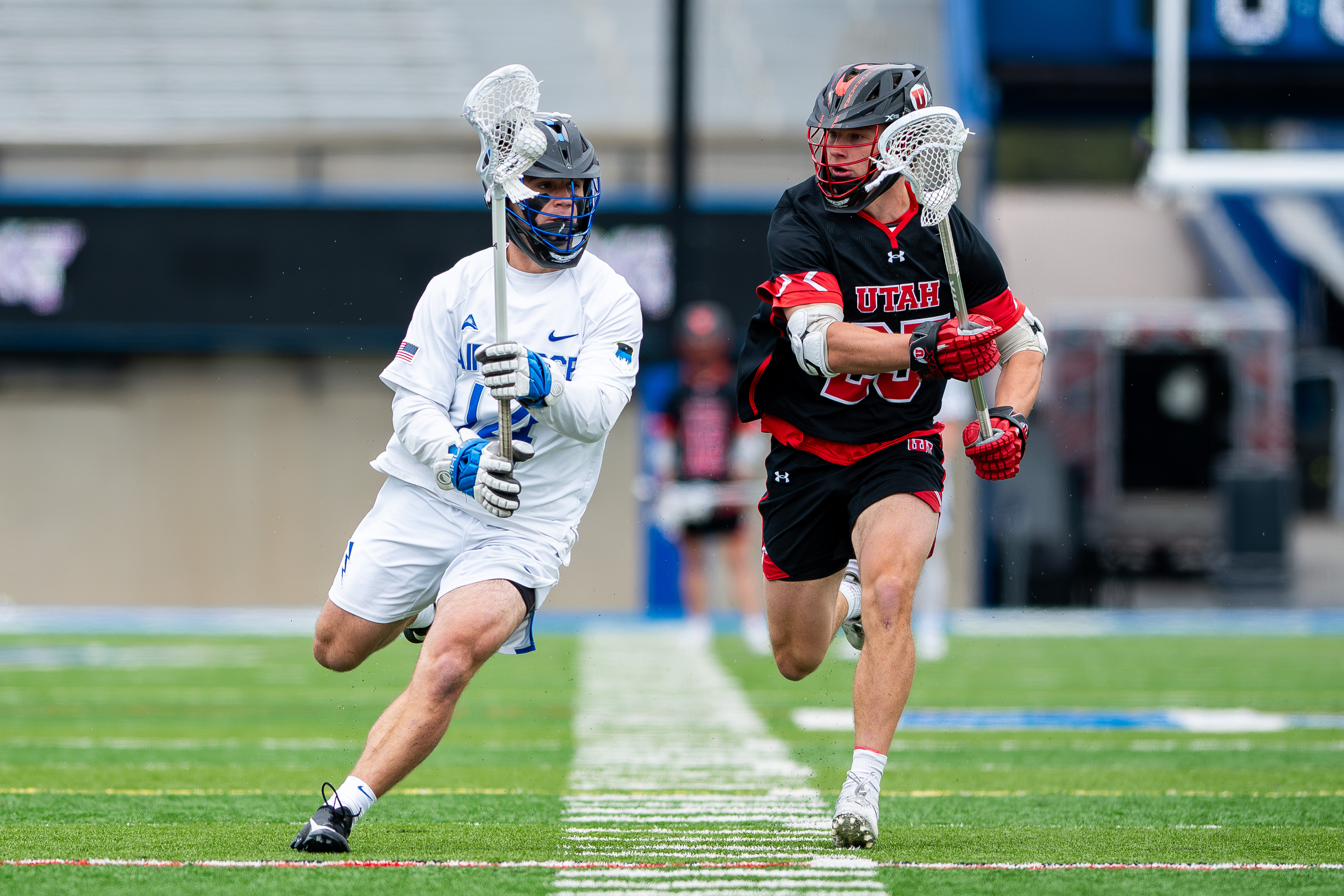
A game between Utah and Air Force in 2025

== Season results ==
The following is a list of Utah's results by season as an NCAA Division I program:

Season	Coach	Overall	Conference	Standing	Postseason
Brian Holman (Independent) (2019–2021)
2019	Brian Holman	5–10			
2020	Brian Holman	3–3			†
2021	Brian Holman	4–7			
Brian Holman:		12–20 (.375)			
Andrew McMinn (ASUN Conference) (2022–present)
2022	Andrew McMinn	10–4	5–0	1st	
2023	Andrew McMinn	12–5	9–0	1st	NCAA Division I First Round
2024	Andrew McMinn	12–5	8–1	T–1st	NCAA Division I First Round
2025	Andrew McMinn	6–9	4–1	T–1st	
2026	Andrew McMinn	9–5	4–1	T–1st	
Andrew McMinn:		49–28 (.636)	33–3 (.917)		
Total:		61–48 (.560)			
National champion Postseason invitational champion Conference regular season champion Conference regular season and conference tournament champion Division regular season champion Division regular season and conference tournament champion Conference tournament champion

†NCAA canceled 2020 collegiate activities due to COVID-19.
