= Trevor Baptiste =

American lacrosse player (born 1996)

- Baptiste in 2019

Personal information
- Nationality: American
- Born: July 3, 1996 (age 30) Newark, New Jersey, U.S.
- Height: 6 ft 0 in (183 cm)
- Weight: 220 lb (100 kg; 15 st 10 lb)
- Website: http://trevorbaptiste.co/

Sport
- Position: Faceoff specialist (field), Transition (box)
- Shoots: Right
- NCAA team: Denver (2018)
- NLL team Former teams: San Diego Seals; Philadelphia Wings
- MLL draft: 1st overall, 2018; Boston Cannons
- MLL teams: Boston Cannons
- PLL team: New York Atlas
- Pro career: 2018–

Career highlights
- PLL: 1x Champion (2025); Jim Brown Most Valuable Player (2022); 5× Face-Off Athlete of the Year (2019, 2021−2024); Second Team All-Pro (2025); 5× All-Star (2019, 2021-2024); Dave Huntley Sportsmanship Award (2026); NLL: NLL All-Rookie Team (2019); MLL: All-Star (2018); NCAA: NCAA Championship (2015); 4× First Team All-American (2015-2018); 4× Big East Midfielder of the Year (2015-2018); 4× First Team All-Big East (2015-2018); NCAA All-Tournament Team (2015); Records: NCAA Record, Face-off wins by a freshman in a DI season (2015); NCAA Record, career faceoff winning percentage (.714)
Medal record
Representing United States
Men's lacrosse
World Lacrosse Championship
Gold medal – first place	2018 Netanya
Gold medal – first place	2023 San Diego
World Indoor Lacrosse Championship
Third place	2019 Langley

Trevor Baptiste (born July 3, 1996) is an American professional lacrosse player who plays as a face-off specialist for the New York Atlas of the Premier Lacrosse League (PLL) and the San Diego Seals of the National Lacrosse League (NLL).

Baptiste attended the University of Denver, where he set the NCAA Division I season record for face-off wins by a freshman. During the 2015 regular season, Baptiste led all of college lacrosse in face-off win percentage (72%). He also set the Pioneers' school record for face-off wins during a season. He was selected first overall in the 2018 MLL Draft, by the Boston Cannons. Baptiste has won the PLL Faceoff Athlete of the Year Award five times (2019, 2021, 2022, 2023, 2024).

He is widely regarded as one of the greatest face-off specialists of all time, and the most dominant face-off specialist of his era.

== Early life and education ==
Trevor Baptiste, son of Dena Baptiste and Leon Baptiste, was born in Newark, New Jersey. He and his sister grew up in Roxbury Township, New Jersey and Denville Township, New Jersey. Baptiste graduated from Morristown-Beard School in Morristown, New Jersey, in 2014. During his four high school years, he played on both the lacrosse and swim teams. Prior to his senior year, Baptiste was an Under Armour Underclass All American in 2013.

During his senior year, Baptiste served as a captain of the lacrosse team. He helped guide Morristown-Beard to an undefeated season (8-0) as the 17th ranked team in New Jersey. Baptiste also helped drive a playoff run that ended as team runner-up for the state championship. Morristown-Beard School awarded him their Most Valuable Player Award and Alden C. Hess Award for his work ethic. Baptiste also earned selection to the 2014 US Lacrosse All American Team and The Star-Ledger's First Team All State. He went 80% in face-offs that season, scored 42 goals, and notched 22 assists. During his high school career, Baptiste scored 100 goals and notched 43 assists. He also scooped up a net total of 640 ground balls.

== College lacrosse career ==
=== Recruited for Denver in 2014 ===
During his college search in 2014, Baptiste initially considered attending an NCAA Division III school. He had planned to play for the Franklin & Marshall Diplomats in Lancaster, Pennsylvania, until the University of Denver called. In March, Baptiste took a late-season recruiting visit to Denver, Colorado, and he signed an intent to play for the Pioneers in April.

Denver named Baptiste their new face-off specialist. Taking over the position from junior Chris Hampton. In October, Baptiste dominated face-offs in the Pioneers' exhibition game against the defending champion Denver Outlaws. He won 76.9% of his face-offs to drive Denver's 15–7 victory over the Major League Lacrosse team.

=== 2015 season ===
Making his season debut, Baptiste dominated face-offs in Denver's season-opening victory over the defending champion Duke Blue Devils. He won 73.5% of his face-off attempts. Baptiste's 25 face-off wins came close to tying the Pioneers' record for face-off wins in a game (26). The Big East Conference and NCAA.com both named Baptiste their offensive player of the week.

During the 2015 season, Baptiste ranked sixth in ground balls per game in the Big East Conference. He led the conference and the nation in face-off win percentage. Baptiste scored seven goals and notched five assists. During a game against the Providence Friars, Baptiste won 91.7% of his face-offs to guide the Pioneers' comeback victory. In May, he went 73.1% in face-offs in Denver's 16–8 defeat of the Georgetown Hoyas to capture the Big East tournament championship.

Baptiste's overall performances during his rookie season earned him the nickname "The Beast". The Big East Conference awarded him their 2015 Midfielder of the Year Award and named him to First Team All-Big East. Baptiste was the only freshman named among the 25 nominees for the Tewaaraton Trophy for the top lacrosse player announced on April 23, 2015. In May, the United States Intercollegiate Lacrosse Association (USILA) named him a First Team All-American. Baptiste was one of seven Pioneers selected for the All-American Team, the most in school history. Connor Cannizzaro and he were only the second and third Pioneers to achieve DI First Team All-America honors in school history. Baptiste was also the first freshman selected as a First Team All American since 2001.

In his first playoff game, Baptiste went only 42% in face-offs in a victory over the Brown Bears. Reaching the quarterfinals, he rebounded against the Ohio State Buckeyes. Baptiste won 13 of his final 23 face-offs (56.5%) to help drive a comeback win by Denver to reach the NCAA Tournament Final Four. In the semi-finals, he exerted greater dominance in face-offs against the Notre Dame Fighting Irish. Baptiste won 15 of his 24 face-offs (62.5%) to power Denver's overtime victory to reach the championship final. He reached the milestone of 300 face-off wins in the victory. Baptiste's 24 face-off attempts also advanced him higher among all-time DI players making 400 or more face-off attempts in a season. His 437 face-off attempts in 2015 trailed only past performances by Duke's Brendan Fowler, Albany's Kevin Klueckert, and Bryant's Kevin Massa.

In the NCAA DI Tournament Final, Baptiste won 10 out of 19 face-offs (52.6%) against the Maryland Terrapins. His performance helped drive the Pioneers to the championship victory, the first in school history and the first west of the Appalachian Mountains. The NCAA named Baptiste and teammates Ryan LaPlante, Zach Miller, Mike Riis, and Wesley Berg to the All-Tournament Team. Berg won the Tournament's Most Valuable Player Award.

Baptiste finished the 2015 season with 310 face-off wins out of 456 attempts (68.0%) and 140 ground balls. This marked the fourth best season in face-off wins in DI college lacrosse history. Following the season, Sports Illustrated featured Baptiste for their article on the art of face-offs. In June, Lacrosse Magazine selected Baptiste as one of their 13 Year-End All-Americans.

=== 2016 season ===
Baptiste would win double digit faceoffs in every game as a sophomore, finishing the season having won 69.4% of his faceoffs, and he would set a school record with 20 ground balls in a single game in a 17–10 win over St. John's. Baptiste would once again be named a First Team All American and Big East midfielder of the year.

=== 2017 season ===
As a junior, Baptiste led the nation in faceoff percentage (74.4%), and was second in total faceoff wins (297) while also scoring twelve goals. Notably, he scored his first career hat trick as well as adding an assist and winning 23 of 28 faceoffs in a 16–11 win over Villanova.

=== 2018 season ===
As a senior, Baptiste would set the NCAA career record for faceoff wins in the Big East Tournament against Marquette, though this record would eventually be broken by TD Ierlan. He would be named a first team All American for the fourth time, becoming just the sixth player ever to do so.

== International career ==
Baptiste was selected for Team USA for the 2018 World Lacrosse Championship, where he won 67 of 89 faceoffs as the USA would capture the gold medal. He would also represent the United States at the 2019 World Indoor Lacrosse Championship, winning a bronze medal.

== Professional career ==
=== Major League Lacrosse ===
Baptiste was drafted first overall by the Boston Cannons of the MLL in 2018, where he recorded three goals and a face-off percentage of 55.4%.

=== National Lacrosse League ===
Baptiste played four seasons for the Philadelphia Wings, before he was traded to the San Diego Seals on August 4, 2023, as part of a three team trade also involving the New York Riptide.

=== Premier Lacrosse League ===
In 2019, Baptiste decided to join Paul Rabil's new PLL. Rabil said on Pardon My Take that he made sure that Baptiste ended up on the Atlas Lacrosse Club roster because he wanted the best FOGO in the league. Finishing in the top two in the fan vote, Baptiste was selected as a captain for the 2019 PLL All-Star Game. He led the league in faceoff percentage and grounds balls at the end of the 2019 season.

In the 2022 season, Baptiste won the Jim Brown MVP Award, as well as his third Paul Cantabene Faceoff Athlete of the Year Award having won 70 percent of his faceoffs, along with scoring 10 points.

== Statistics ==
=== MLL ===
Season	Team	Regular season											Playoffs										
Season	Team	GP	G	2PG	A	Pts	Sh	GB	Pen	PIM	FOW	FOA	GP	G	2PG	A	Pts	Sh	GB	Pen	PIM	FOW	FOA
2018	Boston Cannons	7	3	0	0	3	15	63	0	1	123	222	–	–	–	–	–	–	–	–	–	–	–
		7	3	0	0	3	15	63	0	1	123	222	0	0	0	0	0	0	0	0	0	0	0
Career total:		7	3	0	0	3	15	63	0	1	123	222											

GP–Games played; G–Goals; 2PG–2-point goals; A–Assists; Pts–Points; Sh–Shots; GB–Ground balls; Pen–Penalties; PIM–Penalty minutes; FOW–Faceoffs won; FOA–Faceoffs attempted

=== NLL ===
Season	Team	GP	G	A	Pts	LB	PIM	FO Wins	FO Attempts	FO %
2018-19	Philadelphia Wings	18	0	7	7	179	2	362	532	68.05
2019-20	Philadelphia Wings	14	6	4	10	156	10	249	340	73.24
2021-22	Philadelphia Wings	18	2	4	6	199	12	304	446	68.16
2022-23	Philadelphia Wings	17	2	4	6	218	8	306	436	70.18
2023-24	San Diego Seals	17	3	5	8	177	28	308	431	71.46
NLL totals		84	13	24	37	929	60	1529	2185	69.97

=== PLL ===
Season	Team	Regular season											Playoffs										
Season	Team	GP	G	2PG	A	Pts	Sh	GB	Pen	PIM	FOW	FOA	GP	G	2PG	A	Pts	Sh	GB	Pen	PIM	FOW	FOA
2019	Atlas	10	3	1	3	7	15	73	0	0	164	261	1	0	0	0	0	3	10	0	0	13	24
2020	Atlas	5	1	0	0	1	3	22	2	1	57	106	–	–	–	–	–	–	–	–	–	–	–
2021	Atlas	9	4	0	2	6	13	83	0	0	149	229	2	0	0	1	1	0	21	0	0	31	47
2022	Atlas	9	5	1	4	10	18	83	5	2.5	153	219	1	0	0	0	0	1	7	0	0	16	32
2023	Atlas	10	5	0	2	7	24	168	0	0	212	274	1	1	0	0	1	3	31	0	0	33	34
2024	New York Atlas	10	5	0	1	6	13	109	5	2.5	174	263	1	1	1	0	2	2	9	0	0	11	23
2025	New York Atlas	10	4	0	1	5	14	87	1	0.5	156	265	2	0	0	0	0	1	14	0	0	37	55
2026	New York Atlas	7	0	0	0	0	8	54	3	1.5	94	177	–	–	–	–	–	–	–	–	–	–	–
		70	27	2	13	42	108	679	16	8	1,159	1,794	8	2	1	1	4	8	92	0	0	141	215
Career total:		78	29	3	14	46	116	771	16	8	1,300	2,009											

GP–Games played; G–Goals; 2PG–2-point goals; A–Assists; Pts–Points; Sh–Shots; GB–Ground balls; Pen–Penalties; PIM–Penalty minutes; FOW–Faceoffs won; FOA–Faceoffs attempted
