= Tom Schreiber =

American lacrosse player (born 1992)

Personal information
- Nickname: Captain America
- Nationality: United States
- Born: February 24, 1992 (age 34)
- Height: 6 ft 0 in (183 cm)
- Weight: 190 lb (86 kg; 13 st 8 lb)

Sport
- Position: Midfielder (field), Forward (box)
- Shoots: Right
- NCAA team: Princeton University (2014)
- NLL team Former teams: Unsigned free agent Toronto Rock
- MLL draft: 1st overall, 2014; Ohio Machine
- MLL teams: Ohio Machine
- PLL team: Utah Archers
- Pro career: 2014–

Career highlights
- International: 2018 World Lacrosse Championship Most Outstanding Midfielder; 2018 All World Team; NCAA: 3x First Team All-American (2012, 2013, 2014); 1x Third Team All-American (2011); 4x First Team All-Ivy; 2014 Senior CLASS Award; 2x MacLaughlin Award Winner (2013, 2014); MLL: 1x Steinfeld Cup Champion (2017); 4x All-Star Game (2015-2018); 2x MLL MVP (2016, 2017); NLL: Rookie of the Year (2017); PLL: 1x Champion (2023); 1x Jim Brown Most Valuable Player (2023); 5x Gait Brothers Midfielder of the Year (2019, 2020, 2022, 2023, 2024); 2× Brendan Looney Leadership Award (2023, 2024); 4x All-Star (2019, 2021-23); 4x First Team All-Pro (2019, 2020, 2022, 2023); 1x Second Team All-Pro (2021)
Medal record
Representing United States
Men's lacrosse sixes
World Games
Silver medal – second place	2022 Birmingham
Men's lacrosse
World Lacrosse Championship
Winner	2018 Netanya
Winner	2023 San Diego
Men's box lacrosse
World Indoor Lacrosse Championship
Third place	2019 Langley

Tom Schreiber (born February 24, 1992) is an American professional lacrosse player with the Utah Archers of the Premier Lacrosse League and the Toronto Rock of the National Lacrosse League. He attended St. Anthony's High School in South Huntington, New York, and played collegiate lacrosse at Princeton University. Schreiber is the only player to have won the professional outdoor lacrosse MVP award three times. He is widely regarded as one of the greatest midfielders of all time.

== Early life ==
Tom Schreiber's father, Doug Schreiber, was an exceptional lacrosse player. Doug won the 1973 college national player of the year award and the 1973 national championship while playing for the University of Maryland lacrosse team. In 1993, he was inducted into the USA Lacrosse Hall of Fame. He also played for Team USA, winning the 1974 World Lacrosse Championship. In 2023, he won the Tewaaraton Legend Award. Doug owns a food service business and is a lacrosse coach.

Tom Schreiber began playing lacrosse very young under the coaching guidance of his father. He played high school lacrosse for St. Anthony's, playing varsity for the first year during his sophomore year. Throughout the next two years, he earned All-America honors.

== College career ==
Schreiber is the all-time leading scorer from the midfield position at Princeton with 200 points and was a four-time USILA All-American including three seasons on the First Team. He won the MacLaughlin Award as the nation's most outstanding midfielder his junior and senior seasons.

== Professional career ==
=== MLL career ===
Schreiber was selected 1st overall in the 2014 Major League Lacrosse draft by the Ohio Machine. He was named league MVP in both the 2016 and 2017 seasons while leading the Ohio Machine to the MLL championship game in both seasons and winning the championship in 2017.

=== NLL career ===
Schreiber signed as an unrestricted free agent with the Toronto Rock on October 3, 2016, having never played box lacrosse before and scored 94 points during his first season in the National Lacrosse League on his way to being named NLL Rookie of the Year. In 2019 he matched his career high with another 94 point season.

Heading into the 2023 NLL season, Inside Lacrosse ranked Schreiber the #7 best forward in the NLL. During the 2023 season, Schreiber became just the second American born player to record 100 points in an NLL season. His nickname given by Canadian media is Captain America.

=== PLL career ===
In October 2018 it was announced that Schreiber was one of over 140 players who had signed contracts to play in the newly formed Premier Lacrosse League. Following this announcement, Schreiber was assigned to the Archers Lacrosse Club.

Schreiber has topped the PLL Players Top 50 list three times, in 2020, 2022, and 2023.

== Personal life ==
Schreiber is married to fellow Princeton alum and Olympic field hockey player Kathleen Sharkey. They have a daughter, Lillian. His father, Doug, was a 4-time All America lacrosse player, 1973 Player of the Year, and captained Maryland to the 1973 national championship.

== Awards and achievements ==
=== College ===
- 2011 USILA Third Team All-American
- 2012 USILA First Team All-American
- 2013 USILA First Team All-American
- 2013 Lt. Donald MacLaughlin Jr. Award
- 2014 USILA First Team All-American
- 2014 Lt. Donald MacLaughlin Jr. Award

=== MLL ===
- 2016 MLL Most Valuable Player
- 2017 MLL Most Valuable Player

=== NLL ===
- 2017 NLL Rookie of the Year

=== PLL ===
- 2019 Gait Brothers Midfielder of the Year
- 2020 Gait Brothers Midfielder of the Year
- 2022 Gait Brothers Midfielder of the Year
- 2023 Gait Brothers Midfielder of the Year
- 2023 Jim Brown Most Valuable Player
- 2023 PLL Champion
- 2024 Gait Brothers Midfielder of the Year
- 2024 PLL Champion

Preceded by CJ Costabile	McLaughlin Award; 2013	Succeeded by Incumbent
Preceded by Incumbent	McLaughlin Award; 2014	Succeeded by Myles Jones
Preceded by Greg Gurenlian	Major League Lacrosse MVP; 2016	Succeeded by Incumbent
Preceded by Incumbent	Major League Lacrosse MVP; 2017	Succeeded by Rob Pannell

== Statistics ==
=== PLL ===
Season	Team	Regular season											Playoffs										
Season	Team	GP	G	2PG	A	Pts	Sh	GB	Pen	PIM	FOW	FOA	GP	G	2PG	A	Pts	Sh	GB	Pen	PIM	FOW	FOA
2019	Archers	10	17	2	18	37	60	9	0	0	0	0	1	0	0	2	2	2	0	0	0	0	0
2020	Archers	6	12	0	4	16	29	6	0	0	0	0	–	–	–	–	–	–	–	–	–	–	–
2021	Archers	9	14	0	13	27	64	6	0	0	0	0	1	2	0	0	2	7	1	0	0	0	0
2022	Archers	10	19	2	14	35	52	11	0	0	0	0	2	3	0	1	4	16	3	0	0	0	0
2023	Archers	10	18	2	17	37	64	20	2	1	0	0	2	3	0	0	3	12	2	0	0	0	0
2024	Archers	9	11	1	15	27	50	9	0	0	0	0	–	–	–	–	–	–	–	–	–	–	–
2025	Archers	8	6	0	9	15	34	8	1	1	0	0	–	–	–	–	–	–	–	–	–	–	–
		62	97	7	90	194	353	69	3	2	0	0	6	8	0	3	11	37	6	0	0	0	0
Career total:		68	105	7	93	205	390	75	3	2	0	0											

GP–Games played; G–Goals; 2PG–2-point goals; A–Assists; Pts–Points; Sh–Shots; GB–Ground balls; Pen–Penalties; PIM–Penalty minutes; FOW–Faceoffs won; FOA–Faceoffs attempted

=== NLL ===
Tom Schreiber		Regular season									Playoffs								
Season	Team	GP	G	A	Pts	LB	PIM	Pts/GP	LB/GP	PIM/GP	GP	G	A	Pts	LB	PIM	Pts/GP	LB/GP	PIM/GP
2017	Toronto Rock	18	33	61	94	83	0	5.22	4.61	0.00	3	5	7	12	17	0	4.00	5.67	0.00
2018	Toronto Rock	11	25	39	64	57	0	5.82	5.18	0.00	–	–	–	–	–	–	–	–	–
2019	Toronto Rock	18	29	65	94	61	2	5.22	3.39	0.11	2	4	6	10	6	0	5.00	3.00	0.00
2020	Toronto Rock	5	8	11	19	18	4	3.80	3.60	0.80	–	–	–	–	–	–	–	–	–
2022	Toronto Rock	16	47	39	86	91	2	5.38	5.69	0.13	2	6	7	13	7	2	6.50	3.50	1.00
2023	Toronto Rock	18	48	68	116	110	2	6.44	6.11	0.11	1	2	2	4	7	0	4.00	7.00	0.00
2024	Toronto Rock	13	21	55	76	73	8	5.85	5.62	0.62	3	4	6	10	25	0	3.33	8.33	0.00
2025	Toronto Rock	9	13	30	43	57	0	4.78	6.33	0.00	–	–	–	–	–	–	–	–	–
		108	224	368	592	550	18	5.48	5.09	0.17	11	21	28	49	62	2	4.45	5.64	0.18
Career Total:		119	245	396	641	612	20	5.39	5.14	0.17									

GP–Games played; G–Goals; A–Assists; Pts–Points; LB–Loose balls; PIM–Penalty minutes; Pts/GP–Points per games played; LB/GP–Loose balls per games played; PIM/GP–Penalty minutes per games played.

=== MLL ===
Season	Team	GP	G	2ptG	A	Pts
2014	Ohio	10	13	0	7	20
2015	Ohio	14	29	1	30	60
2016	Ohio	14	18	1	36	60
2017	Ohio	10	4	0	26	44
2018	Ohio	3	13	0	11	15
MLL Totals		51	87	2	110	199

=== NCAA ===
Season	Team	GP	G	A	Pts
2011	Princeton	11	16	13	29
2012	Princeton	16	32	28	60
2013	Princeton	15	28	32	60
2014	Princeton	13	30	21	51
NCAA Totals		55	106	94	200
