= Marquette Golden Eagles men's lacrosse =

- Founded: 2011; 15 years ago
- University: Marquette University
- Head coach: Jake Richard (since 2024 season)
- Stadium: Valley Fields (capacity: 2,000)
- Location: Milwaukee, Wisconsin
- Conference: Big East
- Nickname: Golden Eagles
- Colors: Blue and gold

NCAA Tournament appearances
- (2) - 2016, 2017

Conference Tournament championships
- (2) - 2016, 2017

The Marquette Golden Eagles men's lacrosse team represents Marquette University in Milwaukee, Wisconsin and competes in the Big East Conference of NCAA Division I. The Golden Eagles play their home games at Valley Fields starting in 2016 and were formerly coached by Joe Amplo.

== History ==
=== Starting a program ===
Marquette started talking about adding a new program to its offerings in the summer of 2010. The athletic department eventually settled on lacrosse since the school lacked a spectator spring sport, and by September the move was approved by the Board of Trustees. The University partnered with former college head coach Dave Cottle, who led the search committee for the program's first coach. Marquette introduced former Hofstra assistant Joe Amplo as head coach on February 27, 2011.

=== 2015: Put on the map ===
The first two years of play for the Golden Eagles went as expected. Marquette went 5–8 in its first season, earning the program's first victory on March 2, 2013 against Air Force, and 6–10 in the second season. It was 2015 when Amplo and his team started turning heads.

Marquette started its season defeating two straight ranked opponents, No. 18/16 Lehigh and No. 17/19 Hofstra. On February 16 the Golden Eagles entered the media and coaches' top 20 for the first time in program history. They would move as high as 9th in the media poll.

However, Marquette couldn't hold on down the stretch. Losses to Georgetown, Bellarmine, Notre Dame, Duke and Denver ended the Golden Eagles tournament hopes.

=== Tournament Time ===
Despite the strong 2015 season, Marquette hadn't accomplished its goal of making the NCAA Tournament. The team wouldn't have to wait much longer.

After defeating Villanova in the first round of the BIG EAST tournament, the Golden Eagles shocked the lacrosse community on May 7, 2016, defeating then-No. 1 Denver 10-9 for the Golden Eagles' first BIG EAST title. The loss was the first for Denver in their three years of BIG EAST play and the Pioneers first home loss in 22 games. The win was only the second for a Marquette program over a top ranked team, and the first since the men's basketball team took down Kentucky in 2003. Liam Byrnes was named the tournament's most valuable player.

The win propelled the Golden Eagles from an on-the-bubble team to the sixth best seed and Marquette's first tournament appearance in just its fourth season of play. Marquette hosted its first NCAA Tournament game on May 14, 2016, a 10–9 loss to perennial powerhouse North Carolina. The Tar Heels would go on to defeat Maryland 14-13 in overtime for their first NCAA title since 1991.

== All-time head coaches ==
Years	Head coach	Record	Postseason
2012–2019	Joe Amplo	52-53	0–2
2020-2024	Andrew Stimmel	21-41	0–0
2025-	Jake Richard	12-11	0—0
–	Total	82-103	0–2

== Season results ==
The following is a list of Marquette's results by season as an NCAA Division I program:

Season	Coach	Overall	Conference	Standing	Postseason
Joe Amplo (Independent) (2012–2013)
2013	Joe Amplo	5–8			
Joe Amplo (Big East Conference) (2014–2019)
2014	Joe Amplo	6–10	4–2	2nd	
2015	Joe Amplo	10–6	3–2	3rd	
2016	Joe Amplo	11–5	4–1	2nd	NCAA Division I First Round
2017	Joe Amplo	8–8	2–3	4th	NCAA Division I First Round
2018	Joe Amplo	6–8	3–2	T–2nd	
2019	Joe Amplo	6–8	2–3	5th	
Joe Amplo:		52–53 (.495)	18–13 (.581)		
Andrew Stimmel (Big East Conference) (2020–2024)
2020	Andrew Stimmel	3–4	0–0	†	†
2021	Andrew Stimmel	4–8	3–7	T–4th	
2022	Andrew Stimmel	4–11	2–3	4th	
2023	Andrew Stimmel	6–8	1–4	5th	
2024	Andrew Stimmel	4–10	0–5	5th	
Andrew Stimmel:		21–41 (.339)	6–19 (.240)		
Jake Richard (Big East Conference) (2025–2026)
2025	Jake Richard	7–7	2–3	t4th	
2026	Jake Richard	6–4	2-0	TBD	
Jake Richard:		12-11 (.522)	4-3 (.571)		
Total:		85-105 (.441)			
National champion Postseason invitational champion Conference regular season champion Conference regular season and conference tournament champion Division regular season champion Division regular season and conference tournament champion Conference tournament champion

†NCAA canceled 2020 collegiate activities due to the COVID-19 virus.

== Awards ==
=== All-Americans ===
- Tyler Melnyk (2014 Honorable Mention)
- Liam Byrnes (2016 Second Team)
- B.J. Grill (2016 Third Team)
- Jake Richard (2016 Third Team)
- Mason Woodward (2021 Honorable Mention)

=== Big East Coach of the Year ===
- Joe Amplo (2014)

=== Big East Defensive Player of the Year ===
- Liam Byrnes (2016)
- Noah Richard (2019)

=== First-Team All-Big East Selections ===
- B.J. Grill (2014, 2015)
- Tyler Melnyk (2014)
- Liam Byrnes (2015, 2016)
- Kyle Whitlow (2015)
- Ryan McNamara (2016, 2017)
- Noah Richard (2018, 2019)
- John Wagner (2018)
- Nick Grill (2019)
- Tanner Thomson (2019)
- Bobby O'Grady (2022)
- Devon Cowan (2021, 2023)
- Mason Woodward (2021, 2023, 2024)

== Golden Eagles in the Pros ==
Seven Golden Eagles were drafted in the Major League Lacrosse Draft, eight in the National Lacrosse League Draft and three in the Premier Lacrosse League Draft.

The following Golden Eagles players were selected in the National Lacrosse League Draft:

Player	Year	Team
Tyler Melnyk	2014	Edmonton Rush
Andrew Smistad	2014	Calgary Roughnecks
Liam Byrnes	2016	Georgia Swarm
Kyle Whitlow	2016	Colorado Mammoth
Tanner Thomson	2019	Saskatchewan Rush
John Wagner	2019	New York Riptide
Connor McClelland	2020	Saskatchewan Rush
Mason Woodward	2023	New York Riptide
Luke Williams	2024	Calgary Roughnecks
Caleb Creasor	2024	Saskatchewan Rush

The following Golden Eagles players were selected in the Premier Lacrosse League Draft:

Player	Year	Team
Noah Richard	2019	Atlas Lacrosse Club
Mason Woodward	2024	Utah Archers
Peter Detwiler	2026	Carolina Chaos

The following Golden Eagles players were selected in the Major League Lacrosse Draft:

Player	Year	Team
Liam Byrnes	2016	Florida Launch
Jake Richard	2016	New York Lizards
B.J. Grill	2016	Denver Outlaws
Ryan McNamara	2017	Rochester Rattlers
Andy DeMichiei	2017	Ohio Machine
Noah Richard	2019	Chesapeake Bayhawks
Luke Anderson	2020	Chesapeake Bayhawks
