= The Hill Academy =

Location
- Caledon, Ontario; Canada; 43.8787°N 80.0773°W

Information
- Type: independent
- Motto: "Where Sport is a Laboratory for Life."
- Established: 2006 (20 years ago)
- Founder: Peter Merrill
- Principal: Christy Flynn (Secondary School Principal)
- Principal: Tory Merrill (Junior School Principal)
- Grades: K-12
- Gender: co-ed
- Sports: hockey and lacrosse
- Alumni: David Levin, Mitch Marner, Ian MacKay, Clarke Petterson, Brett Ritchie, Devin Shore, Dillon Ward, Laura Stacey
- Website: thehillacademy.com

The Hill Academy is an independent school in Ontario, Canada, for student athletes in Grades K -12/PG with a focus on hockey, lacrosse and golf. It is co-ed, and serves grades K-12.

== History ==
The Hill Academy was founded in 2006 by the Merrill family, for “dedicated student-athletes.”

In 2006 it had 16 student-athletes and held classes at a conference center in Orangeville, Ontario, north-west of Toronto. By 2017 it relocated to three houses in the village of Kleinburg. The 24 students practiced at a community park, and trained at a local gym. In 2010 it had 85 students.

In 2016 Hill Academy had 185 student-athletes divided among four lacrosse teams—three boys’ and one girls’—and three hockey teams. Their classrooms were located next to the Vaughan Sports Village in Vaughan, Ontario. They were ranked the world’s No. 1 high school lacrosse team.

In September 2020 The Hill Academy moved into its new campus on the 134-acre former SGI Canada Caledon Centre for Culture and Education near Alton in Caledon, Ontario. The campus has a turf field named in Honour of former student-athlete Jamieson Kuhlmann - The Jamieson Kuhlmann Legacy Field.

== Curriculum ==
The Hill Academy offers a curriculum to student-athletes in grades K -12. It also offers a post-graduate year called "The Breakaway Year," with a stated goal of raising the profile of student-athletes in order to open doors for their future.

== Staff ==
Peter Merrill is Founder of The Hill Academy. Christy Flynn is the Director, Academics, and Tory Merrill is the Principal. The school has a sports scientist on staff, professional coaches, and academic faculty.
