= 2025 California Redwoods season =

7th season in franchise history

2025 California Redwoods
- League: Premier Lacrosse League
- 2025 record: 2–4
- General Manager: Joe Spallina
- Coach: Anthony Kelly
- Captain: Ryder Garnsey; TD Ierlan; Chris Merle; Brian Tevlin
- Stadium: Torero Stadium

The 2025 California Redwoods season is the 7th season of the California Redwoods of the Premier Lacrosse League (PLL). Prior to the start of the season, Nat St. Laurent resigned from the position of general manager and head coach. He was succeeded by Joe Spallina as general manager and by Anthony Kelly as head coach.

== College draft ==
2025 California Redwoods college draft selections
| Round | Selection | Player | Position | College | Notes |
|---|---|---|---|---|---|
| 1 | 2 | Andrew McAdorey | Midfield | Duke | |
| 1 | 3 | Sam English | Midfield | Syracuse | From the Boston Cannons |
| 1 | 5 | Traded to the New York Atlas | | | |
| 2 | 10 | Chris Kavanagh | Attack | Notre Dame | |
| 3 | 18 | Traded to the Utah Archers | | | From the New York Atlas |
| 4 | 26 | Traded to the Denver Outlaws | | | |
| 4 | 29 | Carter Rice | Defensive Midfield | Syracuse | From the Utah Archers |
| 4 | 31 | Griffin Schutz | Midfield | Virginia | From the Maryland Whipsnakes |

== Personnel ==
=== Coaching staff ===
The following the is 2025 California Redwood's coaching staff.

- Head coach: Anthony Kelly
- Assistant coaches: Chris Bocklet and Chris Collins

=== Current roster ===
2025 California Redwoods current roster
| # | Name | Nationality | Position | Shot | Height | Weight | College |
|---|---|---|---|---|---|---|---|
| 1 | Nakeie Montgomery | United States | Midfield | Right | 5 ft 11 in | 200 lbs | Duke |
| 2 | Andrew McAdorey (R) | United States | Midfield | Right/Left | 5 ft 8 in | 190 lbs | Duke |
| 3 | Carter Rice (R) | United States | Defensive Midfield | Left | 5 ft 11 in | 191 lbs | Syracuse |
| 4 | Dylan Molloy | United States | Attack | Right | 6 ft 0 in | 215 lbs | Brown |
| 5 | Romar Dennis | United States | Midfield | Right/Left | 6 ft 5 in | 225 lbs | Loyola |
| 6 | TD Ierlan (C) | United States | Faceoff | Right | 5 ft 9 in | 190 lbs | Yale |
| 10 | Sam English (R) | Canada | Midfield | Right | 5 ft 11 in | 169 lbs | Syracuse |
| 12 | Brian Tevlin (C) | United States | Defensive Midfield | Right | 5 ft 11 in | 190 lbs | Notre Dame |
| 14 | Wesley Berg | Canada | Attack | Right | 6 ft 2 in | 205 lbs | Denver |
| 19 | Brendan Nichtern | United States | Attack | Right | 6 ft 0 in | 185 lbs | Army |
| 20 | Chris Conlin | United States | Defense | Left | 6 ft 2 in | 210 lbs | Notre Dame |
| 21 | Carter Parlette | United States | Defensive Midfield | Left | 5 ft 11 in | 190 lbs | Notre Dame |
| 22 | Chayse Ierlan | United States | Goalie | Right | 6 ft 1 in | 210 lbs | Johns Hopkins |
| 23 | Chris Merle (C) | United States | Defensive Midfield | Right | 6 ft 1 in | 200 lbs | Virginia |
| 24 | Marquez White | United States | Defensive Midfield | Right | 6 ft 0 in | 185 lbs | Princeton |
| 26 | Sam Handley | United States | Midfield | Right/Left | 6 ft 5 in | 235 lbs | Penn |
| 28 | Jared Conners | United States | Long Stick Midfield | Right | 6 ft 5 in | 215 lbs | Virginia |
| 31 | Chris Fake | United States | Defense | Right | 6 ft 1 in | 220 lbs | Yale |
| 34 | Josh Balcarcel (R) | United States | Midfield | Left | 5 ft 7 in | 175 lbs | Marist |
| 39 | Cole Kastner | United States | Defense | Right | 6 ft 7 in | 215 lbs | Virginia |
| 40 | Arden Cohen | United States | Defense | Left | 6 ft 2 in | 220 lbs | Notre Dame |
| 41 | Charlie Bertrand | United States | Midfield | Left | 6 ft 3 in | 215 lbs | Virginia |
| 42 | Ryan Aughavin | United States | Midfield | Right/Left | 6 ft 0 in | 190 lbs | Brown |
| 43 | Matt Knote | United States | Goalie | Right | 5 ft 10 in | 220 lbs | UMass |
| 47 | Cole Kirst | United States | Midfield | Right/Left | 6 ft 2 in | 210 lbs | Syracuse |
| 50 | Ryder Garnsey (C) | United States | Attack | Left | 5 ft 9 in | 180 lbs | Notre Dame |
| 70 | BJ Farrare | United States | Defensive Midfield | Right/Left | 6 ft 2 in | 210 lbs | Penn |
| 88 | Aidan Danenza | United States | Midfield | Right | 6 ft 3 in | 220 lbs | Duke |
| 94 | Jack Kelly | United States | Goalie | Right | 6 ft 1 in | 225 lbs | Brown |
| 96 | Chris Kavanagh (R) | United States | Attack | Right | 5 ft 10 in | 180 lbs | Notre Dame |

== Regular season ==
=== Schedule ===
| Week | Date | Opponent | Result | Record | Venue | Recap |
|---|---|---|---|---|---|---|
| 1 | May 30 | Denver Outlaws | W 15–12 | 1–0 | Bob Ford Field at Tom & Mary Casey Stadium | Recap |
| 2 | June 7 | Carolina Chaos | W 16–10 | 2–0 | American Legion Memorial Stadium | Recap |
| 3 | June 13 | Utah Archers | L 11–12 | 2–1 | Villanova Stadium | Recap |
| 4 | Bye | | | | | |
| 5 | June 27 | Denver Outlaws | L 12–18 | 2–2 | Torero Stadium | Recap |
| 5 | June 28 | Philadelphia Waterdogs | L 12–9 | 2–3 | Torero Stadium | Recap |
| 6 | Lexus All-Star Game | | | | | |
| 7 | July 12 | Carolina Chaos | L 10–12 | 2–4 | Lanny and Sharon Martin Stadium | Recap |
| 8 | July 18 | New York Atlas | | | Rafferty Stadium | Preview |
| 9 | July 25 | Utah Archers | | | Zions Bank Stadium | Preview |
| 10 | August 2 | Maryland Whipsnakes | | | Peter Barton Lacrosse Stadium | Preview |
| 11 | August 8 | Boston Cannons | | | Harvard Stadium | Preview |

=== Game summaries ===
==== Week 1: Denver Outlaws ====
| May 30, 2025; 8:30 p.m. EDT | California Redwoods | 15–12 (3–3, 6–5, 12–8, 15–12) | Denver Outlaws | Bob Ford Field at Tom & Mary Casey Stadium, Albany |

Game reference
| Chayse Ierlan | Goalies | Owen McElroy |
| Chris Kavanagh 4; Dylan Molloy 3; Charlie Bertrand 2; Andrew McAdorey 2; Josh Balcarcel 1; Aidan Danenza 1; TD Ierlan 1; Brian Tevlin 1 | Point scorers | Zach Geddes 3; Logan Wisnauskas 3; Pat Kavanagh 2; Brennan O'Neill 2; Jake Piseno 1; Dalton Young 1 |
| 35 | Shots | 45 |

==== Week 2: Carolina Chaos ====
| June 7, 2025; 7:00 p.m. EDT | California Redwoods | 16–10 (0–4, 9–5, 14–6, 16–10) | Carolina Chaos | American Legion Memorial Stadium, Charlotte |

Game reference
| Chayse Ierlan | Goalies | Blaze Riorden; Austin Kaut |
| Dylan Molloy 4; Ryder Garnsey 3; Andrew McAdorey 3; Josh Balcarcel 2; Jared Conners 2; TD Ierlan 1; Chris Merle 1 | Point scorers | Adam Charalambides 4; Jarrod Neumann 4; Jackson Eicher 1; Cross Ferrara 1 |
| 58 | Shots | 31 |

==== Week 3: Utah Archers ====
| June 13, 2025; 8:30 p.m. EDT | California Redwoods | 11–12 (2–5, 6–6, 7–8, 11–12) | Utah Archers | Villanova Stadium, Villanova |

Game reference
| Chayse Ierlan | Goalies | Brett Dobson |
| Sam Handley 3; Dylan Molloy 2; Josh Balcarcel 1; Charlie Bertrand 1; Ryder Garnsey 1; TD Ierlan 1; Chris Kavanagh 1; Andrew McAdorey 1 | Point scorers | Sam King 3; Matt Moore 3; Tom Schreiber 3; Mac O'Keefe 1; Mike Sisselberger 1; Cam Wyers 1 |
| 44 | Shots | 42 |

==== Week 5 game 1: Denver Outlaws ====
| June 27, 2025; 9:00 p.m. EDT | Denver Outlaws | 18–12 (6–3, 8–6, 11–10, 18–12) | California Redwoods | Torero Stadium, San Diego |

Game reference
| Logan McNaney | Goalies | Chayse Ierlan |
| Pat Kavanagh 5; Justin Anderson 2; Jared Bernhardt 2; Graham Bundy Jr. 2; Brennan O'Neill 2; Ryan Terefenko 2; Logan Wisnauskas 2; Luke Wierman 1 | Point scorers | Andrew McAdorey 4; Sam English 2; Chris Kavanagh 2; Dylan Molloy 2; Ryder Garnsey 1; Sam Handley 1 |
| 42 | Shots | 43 |

==== Week 5 game 2: Philadelphia Waterdogs ====
| June 28, 2025; 6:00 p.m. EDT | Philadelphia Waterdogs | 12–9 (2–3, 5–7, 9–9, 12–9) | California Redwoods | Torero Stadium, San Diego |

Game reference
| Dillon Ward | Goalies | Chayse Ierlan |
| Jack Hannah 3; Thomas McConvey 2; Zach Currier 1; Kieran McArdle 1; Ben Randall 1; Christian Scarpello 1; Michael Sowers 1; Jake Taylor 1; Ben Wayer 1 | Point scorers | Romar Dennis 4; Chris Kavanagh 2; Dylan Molloy 2; Josh Balcarcel 1 |
| 42 | Shots | 34 |

==== Week 7: Carolina Chaos ====
| July 12, 2025; 7:00 p.m. EDT | Carolina Chaos | 12–10 (2–5, 5–7, 7–8, 12–10) | California Redwoods | Lanny and Sharon Martin Stadium, Evanston |

Game reference
| Blaze Riorden | Goalies | Chayse Ierlan |
| Ross Scott 3; Cross Ferrara 2; Owen Hiltz 2; Adam Charalambides 1; Jackson Eicher 1; Justin Inacio 1; JJ Sillstrop 1; Josh Zawada 1 | Point scorers | Jared Conners 2; Romar Dennis 2; Dylan Molloy 2; Sam English 1; Ryder Garnsey 1; Chris Kavanagh 1; Andrew McAdorey 1 |
| 39 | Shots | 41 |

=== Standings ===
2025 Western Conference Standings
| Team | W | L | PCT | S | SA | SD |
|---|---|---|---|---|---|---|
| Denver Outlaws | 4 | 2 | .667 | 74 | 62 | 12 |
| Carolina Chaos | 3 | 3 | .500 | 62 | 77 | –15 |
| California Redwoods | 2 | 4 | .333 | 73 | 76 | –3 |
| Utah Archers | 2 | 4 | .333 | 57 | 66 | –9 |
