= 2024 Premier Lacrosse League season =

Sixth season of the Premier Lacrosse League

- League: Premier Lacrosse League
- Sport: Field Lacrosse
- Defending champions: Utah Archers (2023)
- Duration: June 1 – September 15
- Teams: 8

Draft
- Top draft pick: Brennan O'Neill
- Picked by: Denver Outlaws

Regular season
- Season MVP: Jeff Teat (New York Atlas)
- Top scorer: Jeff Teat (New York Atlas)

Playoffs
- Finals champions: Utah Archers (2nd title)
- Runners-up: Maryland Whipsnakes
- Finals MVP: Brett Dobson (Archers)

PLL seasons
- ← 2023 2025 →

The 2024 Premier Lacrosse League Season was the 6th season of the Premier Lacrosse League (PLL). The regular season began on June 3 and ran through August 17th. The playoffs ran from September 2 through September 15. This is the first season where PLL teams were assigned to home cities.

The Atlas went 7-3 and earned the #1 seed on the back of Jeff Teat shattering the single-season points record with 64– the previous record being 44, and breaking the assists record with 28.

The Utah Archers were crowned champions on September 15th, beating the Maryland Whipsnakes 12-8, securing back-to-back championships for the first time since the Whipsnakes in 2019-2020.

== Home Cities ==
On May 25, 2023 the PLL announced that the 8 teams will be assigned home cities for the 2024 season. The PLL's tour-based model would still be used with every team playing in one city every weekend (excluding byes), but the home team would play a weekend double-header in the new scheduling system. This move was explained by PLL co-founder and CEO, Mike Rabil in their announcement, “When we looked at our growth over the last five years, matched by our goals, objectives and expansion, tying our teams to home cities was a natural next step for the business."

Starting on June 3, PLL fans were able to vote on which cities should receive teams, but the league would also be considering previous pro-lacrosse ticket success, fan engagement, venues, and TV ratings.

Home cities and team identities were announced on SportsCenter on November 14, 2023. The eight teams would be the Boston Cannons, California Redwoods, Carolina Chaos, Denver Outlaws, Maryland Whipsnakes, New York Atlas, Philadelphia Waterdogs, and Utah Archers. All eight teams were rebranded with new logos, fonts, and jerseys. However, major changes came to the Maryland Whipsnakes and Chrome Lacrosse Club. The Whipsnakes changed their colors from red and green to red, black, and yellow to better match the Maryland Flag. The Chrome rebranded as the Denver Outlaws, sharing a name with Denver's former MLL team.

Home City Location Map

2024 PLL Team Home Cities
Legend:
: Eastern Conference
: Western Conference

New League Structure

Alongside the addition of geographical teams, the PLL added conferences and a new playoff bracket for the 2024 season. In the new Eastern and Western Conference system, the top team from each conference will receive a first-round bye to the semifinals. The next best 4 teams, regardless of conference, will receive the final playoff spots, and subsequently the worst two teams, regardless of conference, will be eliminated from the playoffs.

== Player Movements ==
=== Preseason ===
Notable Retirements

- Michael Ehrhardt (LSM)- Graduated from Maryland in 2014 where he finished with 170 groundballs and 68 caused turnovers. He was a first-team All American and All-ACC in his senior season. He was drafted 7th overall to the Charlotte Hounds in the 2014 MLL Draft. Across his 10-year pro career with the Hounds in the MLL and the Whipsnakes in the PLL, Ehrhardt was a 6-time All Star, 5-time First Team All-pro, and 5-time LSM of the Year. He was a key piece to both of the Whipsnakes' PLL Championships and the USA's gold medal in the 2018 FIL World Championship. Ehrhardt is widely considered one of the greatest defenders of all time, he retired on April 2.
- Tucker Durkin (D)- Graduated from Johns Hopkins in 2013. He was a two-time First Team All-American and two-time Schmeisser Award winner as the NCAA's best defender. Durkin was drafted 3rd overall by the Hamilton Nationals in the 2013 MLL Draft. With the Nationals and Florida Launch of the MLL and the New York Atlas of the PLL, Durkin was a 6-time All-Star, 1st team All-Pro in 2019 and MLL DPOY in 2017. He retired on March 13.
- Tyler Warner (SSDM)- Graduated from Yale in 2018. He was a first-team All-American before being drafted 11th Overall to the Florida Launch of the MLL. In his 5-year career with the Launch and the Maryland Whipsnakes, Warner was a 2-time All-Star, the winner of the 2020 SSDMOY Award, and a Two-time PLL Champion with the Whipsnakes. Whipsnakes Head Coach, Jim Stagnitta, had this to say about Warner “I think he's defined the position, before Danny Logan and Ryan Terefenko, he was the first one that I've seen that was as dominant as he was. And I think he made people realize the value in that position because he was so versatile. He could do so many things.”
- Kyle Hartzell (M)- Graduated from Salisbury in 2008. He was a Captain of Salisbury's 23-0 undefeated DIII National Championship in 2008. Hartzell started his MLL career with the San Francisco Dragons but spent time with several clubs before spending his last 5 MLL years with the New York Lizards. He was a 6-time MLL All-Star and a two-time champion. In 2019, Hartzell moved to the PLL and joined the Atlas where he was an All-Star in his first season. Hartzell finished his career with the California Redwoods and the Boston Cannons. Hartzell retired on September 18 and is now an assistant coach for the Boston Cannons.

Other Retirements

- Eddy Glazener (D) (Redwoods)
- Matt McMahon (D) (Machine and Archers)
- Jordan MacIntosh (M) (Rattlers and Chrome)
- Brian Phipps (G) (Machine, Bayhawks, and Whipsnakes)
- Stephen Kelly (FO) (Archers and Cannons)
- John Sexton (LSM) (Redwoods)
- Max Adler (FO) (Outlaws and Chaos)
- Jack Concannon (G) (Atlas)

Free Agency

Free Agency occurred from March 4 to May 10. Eligible players were any player with an expired contract or any player who was not on an active roster for 30% of the clubs' games.

- Attackmen: Jules Heninburg (Redwoods to Chaos).
- Midfielders: Sergio Perkovic (Redwoods to Chaos), Ronan Jacoby (Archers to Atlas), Jake Richard (Atlas to Waterdogs), and Colin Heacock (Outlaws to Whipsnakes).
- Defenders: Garrett Epple (Redwoods to Cannons).
- Goalies: Tim Troutner (Redwoods to Atlas).

=== College Draft ===
The college draft took place on May 7 at 7 pm (ET) and was broadcast on ESPNU and ESPN+. The newest PLL team, the Denver Outlaws made the most selections with 5, including the number one overall pick, Duke Attackman Brennan O'Neill. The Boston Cannons made the fewest selections with 3.

Rnd.	Pick #	PLL Team	Player	Pos.	College	Conference	Notes
1	1	Denver Outlaws	Brennan O'Neill	Attack	Duke	Atlantic Coast Conference	
1	2	New York Atlas	Connor Shellenberger	Attack	Virginia	Atlantic Coast Conference	
1	3	Maryland Whipsnakes	Ajax Zappitello	Defense	Maryland	Big Ten	
1	4	Carolina Chaos	Shane Knobloch	Midfield	Rutgers	Big Ten	
1	5	New York Atlas	Liam Entenmann	Goalie	Notre Dame	Atlantic Coast Conference	From California
1	6	Boston Cannons	Pat Kavanagh	Attack	Notre Dame	Atlantic Coast Conference	
1	7	Philadelphia Waterdogs	Matt Brandau	Attack	Yale	Ivy League	
1	8	Utah Archers	Mason Woodward	Defense	Marquette	Big East	
2	9	Denver Outlaws	Jake Piseno	LSM	Albany	America East	
2	10	New York Atlas	Jake Stevens	Midfield	Syracuse	Atlantic Coast Conference	
2	11	Denver Outlaws	Graham Bundy Jr.	Midfield	Georgetown	Big East	From Maryland
2	12	Carolina Chaos	Eric Dobson	Midfield	Notre Dame	Atlantic Coast Conference	
2	13	Utah Archers	Beau Pederson	SSDM	Michigan	Big Ten	
2	14	Boston Cannons	Alexander Vardaro	Midfield	Georgetown	Big East	
2	15	Philadelphia Waterdogs	Kenny Brower	Defense	Duke	Atlantic Coast Conference	
2	16	Utah Archers	Dyson Williams	Attack	Duke	Atlantic Coast Conference	
3	17	Maryland Whipsnakes	TJ Malone	Attack	Penn State	Big Ten	From Denver
3	18	California Redwoods	Garrett Degnon	Attack	Johns Hopkins	Big Ten	From New York
3	19	Denver Outlaws	Josh Zawada	Attack	Duke	Atlantic Coast Conference	From Maryland
3	20	Carolina Chaos	Ross Scott	Attack	Rutgers	Big Ten	
3	21	California Redwoods	Levi Anderson	Attack	Saint Joseph's	Atlantic 10	
3	22	Maryland Whipsnakes	Stephen Zupicich	LSM	Villanova	Big East	From Boston
3	23	Philadelphia Waterdogs	Marcus Hudgins	Defense	Ohio State	Big Ten	
3	24	Utah Archers	Colby Barsz	Defense	Towson	Coastal Athletic Association	
4	25	Denver Outlaws	Luke Wierman	Faceoff	Maryland	Big Ten	
4	26	New York Atlas	Tyler Carpenter	Defense	Duke	Atlantic Coast Conference	
4	27	Maryland Whipsnakes	Adam Poitras	Attack	Loyola (MD)	Patriot League	
4	28	Carolina Chaos	Dylan Hess	Midfield	Georgetown	Big East	
4	29	California Redwoods	Chayse Ierlan	Goalie	Johns Hopkins	Big Ten	
4	30	Boston Cannons	Scott Smith	Defense	Johns Hopkins	Big Ten	
4	31	Philadelphia Waterdogs	Michael Boehm	Attack	Michigan	Big Ten	
4	32	California Redwoods	Cole Kastner	Defense	Virginia	Atlantic Coast Conference	

=== Trades ===
In the explanations below, (PD) indicates trades completed prior to the start of the draft (i.e. Pre-Draft), while (D) denotes trades that took place during the 2024 draft.

==== First Round ====
1. No. 5: Redwoods → Atlas (PD). On March 15, the Redwoods traded their 2024 first round pick to the Atlas for Attackman Chris Gray and their 2024 third-round pick.

==== Second Round ====
1. No. 11: Whipsnakes → Outlaws (PD). On November 28, the Whipsnakes traded their Second and Third round picks to the Outlaws for Jackson Morrill and their Third Round Pick.

===== Third Round =====
1. No. 17: Outlaws → Whipsnakes (PD). See Pick 11.
2. No. 18: Atlas → Redwoods (PD). See Pick 5.
3. No. 19: Whipsnakes → Outlaws (PD). See Pick 11.
4. No. 22: Cannons → Whipsnakes (PD). On November 28, the Cannons traded their 2024 and 2025 Third round picks and LSM Matt Rees to the Whipsnakes for Midfielder Connor Kirst and Defender Bryce Young.

=== Summary ===
==== Selections by NCAA conference ====
Conference	Round 1	Round 2	Round 3	Round 4	Total
America East	0	1	0	0	1
ACC	4	4	1	2	11
Atlantic 10	0	0	1	0	1
Big East	1	2	1	1	5
Big Ten	2	1	4	4	11
CAA	0	0	1	0	1
Ivy League	1	0	0	0	1
Patriot League	0	0	0	1	1

==== Schools by number of draft selections ====
Selections	Schools
5	Duke
3	Notre Dame, Georgetown, Johns Hopkins
2	Virginia, Maryland, Rutgers, Michigan
1	Albany, Yale, Marquette, Syracuse, Penn State, Saint Joseph's, Villanova, Ohio State, Towson, Loyola (MD)

==== Selections by Position ====
Position	Round 1	Round 2	Round 3	Round 4	Total
Attack	4	1	5	2	12
Defense	2	1	2	3	8
Defensive Midfield	0	1	0	0	1
Faceoff	0	0	0	1	1
Goalie	1	0	0	1	2
LSM	0	1	1	0	2
Midfield	1	4	0	1	6

=== Notable mid-season player movement ===
==== Free-agency ====
Veteran Attackman and 6-year member of the New York Atlas, Eric Law was released by the Atlas on July 9. He spent the first half of the season on the physically unable to perform (PUP) list but was removed from the PUP list the day prior. Law was signed from the player pool by the Denver Outlaws the same day. Law was drafted out of the University of Denver to the Outlaws and played 6 seasons with them in the MLL.

The Whipsnakes released their 2023 leading scorer, Attackman Will Manny to the player pool as a part of their final round of training camp cuts on May 30. Manny went unsigned through the All-Star break until the Boston Cannons signed him from the player pool on July 15. Manny was drafted 14th Overall by the Cannons in the 2013 MLL Draft and played 5 seasons for the team, making this the second homecoming for a PLL player to his former MLL team in the 2024 season.

==== Trades ====
On June 12, the California Redwoods traded Saint Joseph's rookie, Levi Anderson, to the Maryland Whipsnakes for a 2025 4th-round pick. Anderson was the Redwoods' 3rd round pick in the 2024 draft. He was activated from the Unavailable-to-travel list and debuted on June 28 against the New York Atlas.

On August 6th, the Philadelphia Waterdogs traded midfielder Ryan Conrad to the Maryland Whipsnakes for a 2025 2nd-round pick. Conrad spent 5 seasons with the Waterdogs and played in 7 games in 2024, scoring 5 goals and 1 assist. This trade came after the Waterdogs were the first team to be eliminated from playoff contention.

On August 13th, the Maryland Whipsnakes traded midfielder Jackson Morrill to the Utah Archers for a 2025 3rd-round pick. Morrill was traded from the Chrome to the Whipsnakes in 2023 where he played 4 games, notching 2 goals and 8 assists. This trade came at the trade deadline, Morrill was not activated for week 11.

== Rule Changes ==
3 rule changes came into effect for the 2024 season.

- A player cannot use a long pole on the faceoff. This rule change eliminated the strategy, used most by the Cannons and Waterdogs, of a long pole immediately contesting possession after the faceoff to drain the :32 second shot clock. This change was met with immense criticism that the PLL was changing the faceoff too much and harming the game.
- Expanded Definition of a Defenseless Player. The expanded definition now includes players who have just released a shot, and players who have received a pass before establishing possession. A defender may hit a player on the shot only up until their first step. A player has established possession after receiving a pass by taking two steps, cradling, or makes a move to avoid contact.
- Updated replay procedures. Coaches now have two challengers per game and will be granted a third if the first two are successful. There are no coaches challengers in overtime. Officials can initiate reviews in the final two minutes and in overtime. Out-of-bounds plays, run outs, and shot clock resets are now reviewable plays.

== Training camp ==
The Premier Lacrosse League's 2024 training camp was held from May 24, 2024 to May 31, 2024 in Albany, New York at Tom and Mary Casey Stadium at The University of Albany. Teams began camp with a 30-man roster that was finalized on May 23. Teams were required to finalize their 25-man rosters on May 29. Training camp consists of individual and multi-team practices, as well as scrimmages between the teams.

== Tour map ==
Tour locations for the 2024 PLL season
Legend:
: Home City Location
: Neutral Cite Tour Location
: All-Star Game Location
: Quarterfinals Location
: Semifinals Location
: Finals Location

== Tour venues ==
Week	Venue	Home team	Location	Capacity (Note: Capacity may not reflect the capacity for the PLL's purposes due to various areas of the stadium potentially being closed for lacrosse games)	Image	Notes	Ref
1	Tom & Mary Casey Stadium	New York Atlas	Albany, NY	8,500			
2	American Legion Memorial Stadium	Carolina Chaos	Charlotte, NC	10,500	Photo of an empty American Legion Memorial Stadium from the top row of a corner section		
3	Villanova Stadium	Philadelphia Waterdogs	Villanova, PA	12,500		This was the first year the PLL held an event at this venue.	
4	TCO Stadium	Neutral Site	Eagan, MN	6,000			
5	Harvard Stadium	Boston Cannons	Cambridge, MA	25,000		This was the first year the PLL held an event at this venue.	
6 (All-Star Game)	Dr. Mark & Cindy Lynn Stadium	All-Star	Louisville, KY	5,300			
7	Rafferty Stadium	Neutral Site	Fairfield, CT	3,500	An aerial photo of an empty Rafferty Stadium		
8	Torero Stadium	California Redwoods	San Diego, CA	6,000	An aerial photo of an empty Rafferty Stadium		
9	Homewood Field	Maryland Whipsnakes	Baltimore, MD	8,500	Photo of an empty Homewood Field set up for lacrosse, taken from the top row of one of the end sections		
10	Barton Stadium	Denver Outlaws	Denver, CO	2,000			
11	Zions Bank Stadium	Utah Archers	Herriman, UT	5,000	Photo of the exterior of Zions Bank Stadium		
12 (Quarterfinals)	Gillette Stadium	Playoffs	Foxborough, MA	65,878	An aerial photo of an empty Gillette Stadium in 2007		
13 (Semifinals)	Shuart Stadium	Playoffs	Uniondale, NY	11,929			
14 (Championship)	Subaru Park	Playoffs	Chester, PA	18,500	Photo of Subaru Park from the river end of the stadium during an MLS game		

== Schedule ==
The addition of home cities and conferences brought slight changes to the schedule. Every team has one weekend where they are the home team and play a weekend doubleheader. There are two weekends (Minneapolis and Fairfield) when there is no home team and every team plays. Each team will play in-conference opponents twice and out-of-conference opponents once.

Week	Date	Games	Time(EST)	Broadcast (Note: All games broadcast on ESPN+ alongside the network listed.)	Venue	City	Notes
1 Atlas Homecoming	June 1	Utah Archers 12–11 Philadelphia Waterdogs	1 PM	ABC	Tom & Mary Casey Stadium	Albany, NY	
1 Atlas Homecoming	June 1	Boston Cannons 12–19 New York Atlas	3:30 PM	ESPN+	Tom & Mary Casey Stadium	Albany, NY	
1 Atlas Homecoming	June 2	Denver Outlaws 11–16 Carolina Chaos	1 PM	ESPN+	Tom & Mary Casey Stadium	Albany, NY	
1 Atlas Homecoming	June 2	Whipsnakes 13–17 New York Atlas	3:30 PM	ESPN+	Tom & Mary Casey Stadium	Albany, NY	
2 Chaos Homecoming	June 7	California Redwoods 11–12 Carolina Chaos	6 PM	ESPN+	American Legion Memorial Stadium	Charlotte, NC	
2 Chaos Homecoming	June 7	Utah Archers 17–18 (OT) Denver Outlaws	8:30 PM	ESPN+	American Legion Memorial Stadium	Charlotte, NC	
2 Chaos Homecoming	June 8	New York Atlas 15–12 Carolina Chaos	5 PM	ESPN2	American Legion Memorial Stadium	Charlotte, NC	
2 Chaos Homecoming	June 8	Maryland Whipsnakes 9–13 Boston Cannons	7:30 PM	ESPN+	American Legion Memorial Stadium	Charlotte, NC	
3 Waterdogs Homecoming	June 15	Philadelphia Waterdogs 11–12 (OT) Boston Cannons	12:30 pm	ABC	Villanova Stadium	Villanova, PA	
3 Waterdogs Homecoming	June 15	Utah Archers 9–7 Carolina Chaos	7 PM	ESPN+	Villanova Stadium	Villanova, PA	
3 Waterdogs Homecoming	June 16	California Redwoods 15–20 New York Atlas	12:30 PM	ABC	Villanova Stadium	Villanova, PA	
3 Waterdogs Homecoming	June 16	Maryland Whipsnakes 15 (OT)–14 Philadelphia Waterdogs	3 PM	ESPN+	Villanova Stadium	Villanova, PA	
4 Indigenous Heritage Weekend	June 28	New York Atlas 12–16 Maryland Whipsnakes	7 PM	ESPN+	TCO Stadium	Eagan, MN (Minneapolis)	
4 Indigenous Heritage Weekend	June 28	Boston Cannons 14–9 Utah Archers	9:30 PM	ESPN+	TCO Stadium	Eagan, MN (Minneapolis)	
4 Indigenous Heritage Weekend	June 29	California Redwoods 8–13 Denver Outlaws	6 PM	ESPN2	TCO Stadium	Eagan, MN (Minneapolis)	
4 Indigenous Heritage Weekend	June 29	Philadelphia Waterdogs 10–6 Carolina Chaos	8:30 PM	ESPN+	TCO Stadium	Eagan, MN (Minneapolis)	
5 Cannons Homecoming	July 5	California Redwoods 9–7 Boston Cannons	6 PM	ESPN+	Harvard Stadium	Cambridge, MA	
5 Cannons Homecoming	July 5	Denver Outlaws 4–17 New York Atlas	8:30 PM	ESPN+	Harvard Stadium	Cambridge, MA	
5 Cannons Homecoming	July 6	Utah Archers 16–11 Maryland Whipsnakes	4:30 PM	ESPN+	Harvard Stadium	Cambridge, MA	
5 Cannons Homecoming	July 6	Philadelphia Waterdogs 14–11 Boston Cannons	7 PM	ESPN2	Harvard Stadium	Cambridge, MA	
6 PLL All-Star Weekend	July 13	Skills Challenge	1:15 PM	ESPN+	Dr. Mark & Cindy Lynn Stadium	Louisville, KY	
6 PLL All-Star Weekend	July 13	All-Star Game; East 15–12 West	3:00 PM	ESPN	Dr. Mark & Cindy Lynn Stadium	Louisville, KY	
7 Throwback Weekend	July 19	Denver Outlaws 15–13 Philadelphia Waterdogs	6 PM	ESPN+	Rafferty Stadium	Fairfield, CT	
7 Throwback Weekend	July 19	Carolina Chaos 10–9 Maryland Whipsnakes	8:30 PM	ESPN+	Rafferty Stadium	Fairfield, CT	
7 Throwback Weekend	July 20	New York Atlas 12–17 Boston Cannons	3 PM	ABC	Rafferty Stadium	Fairfield, CT	
7 Throwback Weekend	July 20	Utah Archers 15–8 California Redwoods	5:30 PM	ESPN+	Rafferty Stadium	Fairfield, CT	
8 Redwoods Homecoming	July 27	Denver Outlaws 10–12 Boston Cannons	3 PM	ESPN	Torero Stadium	San Diego, CA	
8 Redwoods Homecoming	July 27	Carolina Chaos 8–10 California Redwoods	5:30 PM	ESPN+	Torero Stadium	San Diego, CA	
8 Redwoods Homecoming	July 28	Philadelphia Waterdogs 11–12 New York Atlas	3 PM	ABC	Torero Stadium	San Diego, CA	
8 Redwoods Homecoming	July 28	Maryland Whipsnakes 18–13 California Redwoods	5:30	ESPN+	Torero Stadium	San Diego, CA	
9 Whipsnakes Homecoming	August 3	Philadelphia Waterdogs 6–12 Maryland Whipsnakes	1 PM	ABC	Homewood Field	Baltimore, MD	
9 Whipsnakes Homecoming	August 3	Denver Outlaws 18–5 California Redwoods	3:30 PM	ESPN+	Homewood Field	Baltimore, MD	
9 Whipsnakes Homecoming	August 4	Carolina Chaos 15–14 Utah Archers	12:30 PM	ESPN+	Homewood Field	Baltimore, MD	
9 Whipsnakes Homecoming	August 4	Boston Cannons 14–16 Maryland Whipsnakes	3 PM	ABC	Homewood Field	Baltimore, MD	
10; Outlaws Homecoming	August 9	Maryland Whipsnakes 16–9 Denver Outlaws	8 PM	ESPN+	Barton Stadium	Denver, CO	
10; Outlaws Homecoming	August 9	Philadelphia Waterdogs 12–13 California Redwoods	10:30 PM	ESPN+	Barton Stadium	Denver, CO	
10; Outlaws Homecoming	August 10	New York Atlas 15–11 Utah Archers	2:30 PM	ESPN+	Barton Stadium	Denver, CO	
10; Outlaws Homecoming	August 10	Carolina Chaos 4–10 Denver Outlaws	7 PM	ESPN2	Barton Stadium	Denver, CO	
11; Archers Homecoming	August 16	California Redwoods 12–13 Utah Archers	8 PM	ESPN+	Zions Bank Stadium	Herriman, UT (Salt Lake City)	
11; Archers Homecoming	August 16	Boston Cannons 11–10 Carolina Chaos	10:30 PM	ESPN+	Zions Bank Stadium	Herriman, UT (Salt Lake City)	
11; Archers Homecoming	August 17	New York Atlas 12–13 Philadelphia Waterdogs	6:30 PM	ESPN+	Zions Bank Stadium	Herriman, UT (Salt Lake City)	
11; Archers Homecoming	August 17	Denver Outlaws 9–13 Utah Archers	9 PM	ESPN2	Zions Bank Stadium	Herriman, UT (Salt Lake City)	
12; Quarterfinals	September 2	#3 Boston Cannons 4–8 #6 Carolina Chaos	4 PM	ESPN2	Gillette Stadium	Foxborough, MA (Boston)	
12; Quarterfinals	September 2	#4 Maryland Whipsnakes 11–10 #5 Denver Outlaws	6:30 PM	ESPN+	Gillette Stadium	Foxborough, MA (Boston)	
13 Semifinals	September 7	#1 New York Atlas 11–12 (OT) #4 Maryland Whipsnakes	5 PM	ESPN+	Shuart Stadium	Uniondale, NY (Long Island)	
13 Semifinals	September 7	#2 Utah Archers 10–1 #6 Carolina Chaos	7:30 PM	ESPN+	Shuart Stadium	Uniondale, NY (Long Island)	
14; PLL Cash App Championship	September 15	#4 Maryland Whipsnakes 8–12 #2 Utah Archers	3 PM	ABC	Subaru Park	Chester, PA (Philadelphia)	

Notes

== PLL on TV ==
For the 3rd season, the PLL is on ESPN platforms. Every game can be streamed on ESPN+, while 9 games will be broadcast on ESPN's linear platforms. Additionally, 7 games will be broadcast on ABC, a one-game decrease from 2023.

Opening Weekend

The PLL had a record-setting opening weekend with the best merchandise sales weekend and the highest ever amount of active users on the PLL app. TV ratings also improved as ESPN engagement was up 23% and viewership from the 18-34 demographic was up 71%, both compared to last year. Additionally, the Archers vs Waterdogs game on ABC was the 3rd most-viewed game in PLL history.

== Regular Season Standings ==
2024 Western Conference Standings
Team	W	L	SF	SA	Diff
Utah Archers Y	6	4	129	120	9
Denver Outlaws	5	5	117	121	-4
Carolina Chaos	4	6	100	110	-10
California Redwoods	3	7	104	136	-32

2024 Eastern Conference Standings
Team	W	L	SF	SA	Diff
New York Atlas Y	7	3	151	124	27
Boston Cannons Y	7	3	126	115	11
Maryland Whipsnakes Y	6	4	135	124	11
Philadelphia Waterdogs	2	8	111	123	-12

Top Team in Each Conference Receive a first-round bye
Top 6 Teams Qualify for the 2024 Playoffs
Bottom 2 Teams Miss 2024 Playoffs
Y = Qualified for the Championship Series

== Postseason ==
With the new Home Cities format, the playoff bracket was changed to have two first-round byes for the conference winners and 6 teams total making the playoffs. The one seed plays the winner of the four and five seeds and the two seed plays the winner of the 3 and 6 seeds. The first-round games took place in Foxbourough, MA in Gillette Stadium, the semifinals on Long Island, NY, and the Championship in West Chester, PA.

=== Bracket ===
Quarterfinals; September 4 (Boston)
#4	Whipsnakes	11
#5	Outlaws	10
#3	Cannons	4
#6	Chaos	8

Semifinals; September 10 (Long Island)
#1	Atlas	11
#4	Whipsnakes	12 OT
#6	Chaos	1
#2	Archers	10

PLL Championship Game; September 24 (Philadelphia)
#4	Whipsnakes	8
#2	Archers	12

=== Boxscores and game summaries ===
==== Quarterfinals ====
Game 1 - 4 PM #3 Cannons v.s. #6 Chaos
Team	1	2	3	4	Final
#3 Cannons	1	2	0	1	4
#6 Chaos	2	2	3	1	8

Game 2 - 6:30 PM #4 Whipsnakes v.s. #5 Outlaws
Team	1	2	3	4	Final
#4 Whipsnakes	3	3	3	2	11
#5 Outlaws	3	3	3	1	10

==== Semifinals ====
Game 1 - 5:00 PM #1 Atlas v.s. #4 Whipsnakes
Team	1	2	3	4	OT	Final
#1 Atlas	6	2	0	3	0	11
#4 Whipsnakes	3	2	3	3	1	12

Game 2 - 7:30 PM #2 Archers v.s. #6 Chaos
Team	1	2	3	4	Final
#2 Archers	4	5	0	1	10
#6 Chaos	0	0	0	1	1

==== PLL Championship Game ====
===== Boxscore =====
Team	1	2	3	4	Final
#2 Archers	1	4	3	4	12
#4 Whipsnakes	3	2	1	2	8

==== Championship Game Most Valuable Player ====
Utah Archers goalie, Brett Dobson won back-to-back Championship Game MVP after a 17 saves and 68% performance. He is the first player in PLL history to win back-to-back Championship MVPs.

==== Broadcast ====
The 2024 PLL championship game was broadcast on ABC and ESPN+ with Paul Carcaterra, Ryan Boyle, and Drew Carter in the booth, and Quint Kessenich reporting on the field.

==== Injuries ====
===== Pre-game =====
3x MVP and 5x Midfielder of the Year, Tom Schreiber missed all of the playoffs after suffering a fractured clavicle in the Archers' final game of the regular season. He went on to win his fifth Midfielder of the Year this season.

==== Scoring Summary ====
===== First Quarter =====
- 11:34- Whipsnakes Matt Rambo Goal, 1-0 Whipsnakes
- 7:51- Whipsnakes Ryan Conrad Goal, Assisted by TJ Malone, 2-0 Whipsnakes
- 2:35- Whipsnakes Adam Poitras Goal, 3-0 Whipsnakes
- 0:50- Archers Matt Moore Goal, 3-1 Whipsnakes

===== Second Quarter =====
- 11:49- Whipsnakes Adam Poitras Goal, Assisted by Joe Nardella, 4-1 Whipsnakes
- 10:54- Archers Mason Woodward 2-point Goal, 4-3 Whipsnakes
- 10:18- Archers Tre Leclaire Goal, Assisted by Connor Fields, 4–4 tie
- 9:06- Archers Grant Ament Goal, 5-4 Archers
- 2:51- Whipsnakes Ryan Conrad Goal, Assisted by TJ Malone, 5–5 tie

===== Third Quarter =====
- 9:05- Archers Mac O'Keefe Goal, 6-5 Archers
- 7:22- Whipsnakes Ryan Conrad Goal, Assisted by TJ Malone, 6–6 tie
- 7:02- Archers Matt Moore Goal, 7-6 Archers
- 0:01- Archers Dyson Williams Goal, Assisted by Ryan Ambler, 8-6 Archers

===== Fourth Quarter =====
- 11:12- Archers Tre Leclaire Goal, Assisted by Matt Moore, 9-6 Archers
- 10:36- Archers Mac O'Keefe Goal, 10-6 Archers
- 6:01- Whipsnakes Zed Williams Goal, 10-7 Archers
- 5:28- Archers Connor Fields Goal, 11-7 Archers
- 3:19- Whipsnakes Mike Chanenchuk Goal, Assisted by TJ Malone, 11-8 Archers
- 0:49- Archers Mac O'Keefe Goal, Assisted by Grant Ament, 12-8 Archers

Brendan Krebs ended with 12 saves and a 52.2% save percentage. Brett Dobson won his second-straight Championship MVP with 20 saves and a 71.4% save percentage.

== Regular-season statistical leaders ==
Individual
Statistic	Player	Position	Team
Points	Jeff Teat (64)^	Attack	New York Atlas
One-point goals	Jeff Teat (28)	Attack	New York Atlas
Two-point goals	Romar Dennis (7)+	Midfield	California Redwoods
Scoring Points	Jeff Teat (28)	Attack	New York Atlas
Assists	Jeff Teat (36)^	Attack	New York Atlas
Shots	Brennan O'Neill (82)	Attack	Denver Outlaws
Shot Percentage	Tre Leclaire (50%)	Midfield	Utah Archers
Faceoff Percentage	Joseph Nardella (67.5%)	Face-off	Maryland Whipsnakes
Save Percentage	Blaze Riorden (59.4%)	Goaltender	Carolina Chaos
Caused Turnovers	Garrett Epple (20)+	Defense	Boston Cannons

^ New PLL single-season record

+ Ties PLL single-season record

Team
Statistic	Team
Offensive
Scores per Game	New York Atlas (15.1)
Shots per Game	New York Atlas (44.2)
Shot Percentage	New York Atlas (32.8%)
One-point goals	New York Atlas (139)
Two-point goals	Boston Cannons (16)
Turnovers (High)	Utah Archers (200)
Turnovers (Low)	Boston Cannons (160)
Defensive
Scores Against Average (Low)	Carolina Chaos (11)
Scores Against Average (High)	California Redwoods (13.6)
Two-Points Goals Against (Low)	Boston Cannons (4)
Two-Point Goals Against (High)	New York Atlas (15)
Caused Turnovers	Philadelphia Waterdogs (84)
Groundballs recovered	New York Atlas (389)
Saves Per Game	Utah Archers (14.1)
Save Percentage	Carolina Chaos (57.3%)
Power Play and Penalty Kill
Power Play Goal Percentage	New York Atlas (45.8%)
Power Play Goals	Archers and Atlas (11)
Penalty Kill Percentage	Maryland Whipsnakes (100%)
Penalty Kills	New York Atlas (22)
Penalties (Low)	Maryland Whipsnakes (11)
Penalties (High)	New York Atlas (35)
Penalty Minutes (Low)	Maryland Whipsnakes (8)
Penalty Minutes (High)	Carolina Chaos (28)

== Awards ==
=== Individual Season Awards ===
On August 22, the PLL announced the finalists for the 2024 End of Season Awards via Instagram. The Winners were announced on September 13th, two days prior to the Championship Game in Philadelphia. The players voted on the nominees and the winners were selected by the PLL Coaches and Front Office, Award Namesakes, and members of the media.

=== Award winners ===
2024 Premier Lacrosse League Season Award Winners
Award	Winner	Team	Notable statistics	Notable notes
Jim Brown Most Valuable Player	Jeff Teat	New York Atlas	64 points (28 goals and 36 assists)	Broke the single-season points and assists records.
Eamon McEneaney Attackman of the Year	Jeff Teat	New York Atlas		
Gait Brothers Midfielder of the Year	Tom Schreiber	Utah Archers	27 points (10 goals, 1 two-point goal, and 15 assists)	Third straight season winning Midfielder of the year and five out of the last six seasons.
Dave Pietramala Defensive Player of the Year	Matt Dunn	Maryland Whipsnakes	11 caused turnovers, 13 ground balls, and 4 points.	Third DPOY, second in the PLL.
Oren Lyons Goalie of the Year	Blaze Riorden	Carolina Chaos	92 saves, 59% save percentage, 9.8 scores against average, and 3 points.	Fifth win in 6 seasons.
Paul Cantabene Face-Off Athlete of the Year	Trevor Baptiste	New York Atlas	66% face-off percentage, 109 ground balls, and 6 points.	Fourth win in a row, longest active streak in the PLL.
Brodie Merrill Long Stick Midfielder of the Year	Tyler Carpenter	New York Atlas	6 caused turnovers, 41 ground balls, and 7 points.	First rookie to win a positional award since Atlas teammate, Danny Logan, in 2021.
George Boiardi Hard Hat Award - Awarded to the SSDM of the year	Danny Logan	New York Atlas	3 caused turnovers, 9 ground balls, and 2 points.	Third win in 4 seasons.
2024 Rookie of the Year	TJ Malone	Maryland Whipsnakes	37 points (19 goals and 18 assists)	Led all rookies in points, goals, and assists as a third-round pick.
Dick Eddell Coach of the Year	Mike Pressler	New York Atlas		Second-season as coach of the Atlas. Improved from 2–8 to 7-3 this season, securing the #1 overall seed.
Dave Huntley Sportsmanship Award	JT Giles-Harris	Denver Outlaws		
Welles Crowther Humanitarian Award	Romar Dennis	California Redwoods		
Jimmy Regan Teammate Award	Ryan Ambler	Utah Archers		
Brendan Looney Leadership Award	Tom Schreiber	Utah Archers		Back-to-back wins.

==== List of awards and finalists ====
The winner of the award are highlighted in Bold.

===== Jim Brown Most Valuable Player =====
- **Jeff Teat** - Broke the single-season Points and Assists records.
- Blaze Riorden
- Asher Nolting
- Tom Schreiber

===== Eamon McEneaney Attackman of the Year =====
- **Jeff Teat** - Led league in points, goals, and assists.
- Zed Williams
- Michael Sowers
- Asher Nolting
- Marcus Holman

===== Gait Brothers Midfielder of the Year =====
- **Tom Schreiber**
- Grant Ament
- Matt Campbell
- Dox Aitken
- Zach Currier

===== Dave Pietramala Defensive Player of the Year =====
- **Matt Dunn**
- JT Giles-Harris
- Garrett Epple - Led the league in caused turnovers (20).
- Gavin Adler

===== Oren Lyons Goalie of the Year =====
- **Blaze Riorden** - Led the league in save percentage (59.4%)
- Brett Dobson - Led the league in saves (147).
- Liam Entenmann
- Colin Kirst

===== Paul Cantabene Face-Off Athlete of the Year =====
- **Trevor Baptiste** - Led the league in face-off wins (174), T-led FO in points and goals.
- Joseph Nardella - Led the league in face-off percentage (67.5%), T-led FO in goals.
- TD Ierlan

===== Brodie Merrill Long Stick Midfielder of the Year =====
- **Tyler Carpenter** - Led LSMs in ground balls (41).
- Ethan Rall - Led LSMs in caused turnovers (12)
- Jared Conners

===== George Boiardi Hard Hat Award - Awarded to the SSDM of the year =====
- **Danny Logan**
- Ryan Terefenko
- Zach Geddes

===== 2024 Rookie of the Year =====
- **TJ Malone** - Led rookies in points, goals, and assists.
- Liam Entenmann - 2nd in save percentage (58.7%)
- Tyler Carpenter - Won LSM of the Year.
- Connor Shellenberger
- Brennan O'Neill - Led rookies in scoring points (21).

===== Dick Edell Coach of the Year =====
- **Mike Pressler**
- Tim Soudan
- Jim Stagnitta

===== Dave Huntley Sportsmanship Award =====
- **JT Giles-Harris**
- Myles Jones
- Matt Deluca
- Piper Bond

===== Welles Crowther Humanitarian Award =====
- **Romar Dennis**
- Mike Sisselberger
- Nakeie Montgomery
- Brett Makar

===== Jimmy Regan Teammate Award =====
- **Ryan Ambler**
- Cole Kirst
- Austin Kaut

===== Brendan Looney Leadership Award =====
- **Tom Schreiber**
- Marcus Holman
- Matt Dunn

== Coaching Changes ==
=== Offseason Changes ===
On March 28, 2024 it was announced that Legendary Denver Coach, Bill Tierney would take over the Waterdogs Head Coach vacancy. Tierney had spent the last 14 seasons coaching the University of Denver, taking them to the tournament 10 times and winning the National Championship in 2015. Tierney is taking over the Waterdogs from 4-year Head Coach Andy Copelan.

== Uniforms ==
=== Home City Uniforms ===
Every team was given two new uniforms for the 2024 season showcasing the new assigned cities.

The PLL continued its partnership with Champion, while six teams displayed additional jersey advertisements.

- The Waterdogs have a Dude Wipes patch on the right side of the chest for both uniforms.
- The Whipsnakes have a Whirlpool patch on the right side of the chest for both uniforms.
- The Redwoods have a Progressive patch on the right sleeve for both uniform.
- The Chaos have a Rebel Bourbon patch on the right sleeve for both uniforms.
- The Atlas have a Charlotte's Web patch on the right sleeve for both uniforms.
- The Archers have a Progressive patch on the right sleeve and a Utah Sports Commission patch on the left sleeve for both uniforms.

=== Callum Robinson Death ===
Former 6-year pro-lacrosse player Callum Robinson, his brother Jake, and their friend Jack Rhoad were killed during a surfing trip in Mexico on April 27. An outpouring of support and stories came from the entire lacrosse community after news broke. Callum was a loved and respected member of pro lacrosse for his entire career and beyond. Callum played for the Atlas for 2 seasons and the team showed a tribute to him by displaying a "CR" patch on the left chest of both uniforms and a "Big Koala" (Callum's Nickname) sticker on all helmets.

=== Alternate Uniforms ===
July 8–9 in Eagan, Minnesota, was the PLL's Indigenous Heritage Weekend for the 2024 Season. This included unique jerseys designed by Patrick Hunter "a 2Spirit, Ojibwe artist, graphic designer, and award-winning entrepreneur", on-air analysis from Jeremy Thompson, and orange chip straps dedicated to Every Child Matters, a movement memorializing the thousands of children killed in Canadian Residential Boarding Schools. The PLL held their annual Throwback Weekend for the 2024 season July 19–20 in Fairfield, CT. Each team was given a new retro-designed logo and throwback style porthole jerseys.

== All-Star Game ==
The 2024 PLL All-Star Game was held at Dr. Mark & Cindy Lynn Stadium on July 13. New in 2024, the All-Star teams were divided by conference. The West Team was coached by Archers coach, Chris Bates, and the East Team was coached by Waterdogs coach, Bill Tierney. Just as in years prior, there was a variety of skills challenges before the All-Star game, also on July 13.

The East defeated the West 15-12.

Skills Challenge

The All-Star Skills Challenges included 5 competitions, some including women's lacrosse players from Unleashed Women's Lacrosse, the women's training and content arm of the PLL.

4 PLL players and 4 Unleashed players competed in the Accuracy Challenge where players hit various targets on an open net. 4 PLL players and 4 Unleashed players competed separately in the Fastest Shot Competition. The Goalie Challenge included 4 PLL goalies and the new "Air-Gait Challenge" had 4 PLL players attempt their best "Air-Gait" crease dive style goal. Finally, teams of 2 PLL players and 2 Unleashed Players competed East against West in the Derby Challenge which included a sprint, agility and dodging course, wall ball, and accuracy shot.

Skills Challenge Results
Challenge	Winner	Team
Air-Gait Competition	Ryder Garnsey	California Redwoods
Accuracy Competition	Marcus Holman	Boston Cannons
Goalie Skills	Tim Troutner	New York Atlas
Fastest Shot	Jarrod Neumann	Carolina Chaos
Fastest Shot	Charlotte North	Boston College
Derby Challenge	West (Tom Schreiber, Piper Bond, Izzy Scane, and Emily Hawryschuck)	Utah Archers, Northwestern, and Syracuse

Viewership

The PLL posted a 35% increase in All-Star Game viewership on ESPN. This increase coincided with other increases at the midseason point of the season. Both online and in-person stats increased. The PLL posted a 47% raise in PLL App users and an increase of 159% in social media views. Alongside a 16% increase in attendance and a 32% raise in merchandise sales.
