= 2025 Premier Lacrosse League season =

Seventh season of the Premier Lacrosse League

- League: Premier Lacrosse League
- Sport: Field Lacrosse
- Defending champions: Utah Archers (2024)
- Duration: May 30 – September 14
- Teams: 8

Draft
- Top draft pick: CJ Kirst
- Picked by: Philadelphia Waterdogs

Regular season
- Season MVP: Connor Shellenberger (New York Atlas)
- Top scorer: Connor Shellenberger (New York Atlas)

Playoffs
- Finals champions: New York Atlas (1st title)
- Runners-up: Denver Outlaws
- Finals MVP: Jeff Teat (New York Atlas)

PLL seasons
- ← 2024 2026 →

The 2025 Premier Lacrosse League season was the 7th season of the Premier Lacrosse League (PLL). The regular season began on May 30 and ran through August 9. The playoffs ran from August 22 through September 14. The New York Atlas defeated the Denver Outlaws 14–13 in the championship game.

== Player movements ==
=== Retirements ===
- Chris Gray (Atlas, Redwoods)
  - 2x All-Star, NCAA All-time Points Leader
- Kyle Bernlohr (Whipsnakes)
  - 6x All-Star, 1x first-team All-Pro, 1x Goalie of the Year, 2x PLL champion (2019, 2020)
- Mike Channenchuck (Whipsnakes)
  - 5x All-Star, 1x first-team All-Pro, 1x second-team All-Pro, 2x PLL champion (2019, 2020)

=== Free agency ===
Free agency occurred from March 3 to May 7. Eligible players were any player with an expired contract or any player who was not on an active roster for 30% of the clubs' games.

Notable movements include:

- Rob Pannell (Redwoods to Whipsnakes)
- Dylan Molloy (Atlas to Redwoods)
- CJ Costabile (Chaos to Atlas)
- Zach Geddes (Chaos to Outlaws)

=== College Draft ===
The college draft took place on May 6 at 7 pm (ET) and was broadcast on ESPN+. The Philadelphia Waterdogs had the first pick, selecting the NCAA career goals record holder, CJ Kirst. The Denver Outlaws and California Redwoods made the most selections with five, including California making two first-round selections. The Boston Cannons and the Carolina Chaos made the fewest selections with three.

Rnd.	Pick #	PLL Team	Player	Pos.	College	Conference	Notes
1	1	Philadelphia Waterdogs	CJ Kirst	Attack	Cornell	Ivy League	
1	2	California Redwoods	Andrew McAdorey	Midfield	Duke	Atlantic Coast Conference	
1	3	California Redwoods	Sam English	Midfield	Syracuse	Atlantic Coast Conference	From Denver via Boston
1	4	Boston Cannons	Coulter Mackesy	Midfield	Princeton	Ivy League	
1	5	Utah Archers	Brendan Lavelle	Defense	Penn	Ivy League	From Carolina
1	6	New York Atlas	Matt Traynor	Midfield	Penn State	Big Ten	
1	7	Maryland Whipsnakes	Aidan Carroll	Attack	Georgetown	Big East	
1	8	Carolina Chaos	Owen Hiltz	Attack	Syracuse	Atlantic Coast Conference	From Utah
2	9	Philadelphia Waterdogs	Jake Taylor	Attack	Notre Dame	Atlantic Coast Conference	
2	10	California Redwoods	Chris Kavanaugh	Attack	Notre Dame	Atlantic Coast Conference	
2	11	Denver Outlaws	Logan McNaney	Goalie	Maryland	Big Ten	
2	12	Boston Cannons	Mic Kelly	Midfield	Denver	Big East	
2	13	Carolina Chaos	Levi Verch	Defense	Saint Joseph's	Atlantic 10	
2	14	New York Atlas	Max Krevsky	Midfield	Yale	Ivy League	
2	15	Philadelphia Waterdogs	Dylan Hess	SSDM	Florida (Note: Florida's lacrosse program is affiliated with the Men's Collegiate Lacrosse Association, playing at the club sport level. Hess spent his four years of NCAA eligibility with Georgetown where he was a first-team All-American in 2024.)	SouthEastern Lacrosse Conference	From Maryland
2	16	Carolina Chaos	Jack McDonald	Midfield	Maryland	Big Ten	From Utah
3	17	Maryland Whipsnakes	Scott Smith	Defense	Johns Hopkins	Big Ten	From Philadelphia
3	18	Utah Archers	Sam King	Attack	Harvard	Ivy League	From California
3	19	Denver Outlaws	Pace Billings	Defense	Michigan	Big Ten	
3	20	Maryland Whipsnakes	Emmet Carroll	Goalie	Penn	Ivy League	From Boston
3	21	Utah Archers	Mitchell Dunham	Defense	Richmond	Atlantic 10	From Carolina
3	22	New York Atlas	Mike Grace	LSM	Syracuse	Atlantic Coast Conference	
3	23	Philadelphia Waterdogs	Ben Wayer	LSM	Virginia	Atlantic Coast Conference	From Maryland
3	24	Maryland Whipsnakes	Christian Mazur	SSDM	Army	Patriot League	From Utah
4	25	Philadelphia Waterdogs	Jimmy Freehill	Defense	Denver	Big East	
4	26	Denver Outlaws	Kevin Parnham	Defense	Penn State	Big Ten	From California
4	27	Denver Outlaws	Jack Gray	SSDM	Duke	Atlantic Coast Conference	
4	28	Boston Cannons	Ben Ramsey	SSDM	Notre Dame	Atlantic Coast Conference	
4	29	California Redwoods	Carter Rice	SSDM	Syracuse	Atlantic Coast Conference	From Carolina
4	30	New York Atlas	Hugh Kelleher	Midfield	Cornell	Ivy League	
4	31	California Redwoods	Griffin Schultz	Midfield	Virginia	Atlantic Coast Conference	From Maryland
4	32	Utah Archers	Bryce Ford	Midfield	Maryland	Big Ten	

==== Trades ====
In the explanations below, (PD) indicates trades completed prior to the start of the draft (i.e. Pre-Draft), while (D) denotes trades that took place during the 2025 draft.

===== First round =====
1. No. 3: Outlaws → Cannons (PD). On November 7, the Cannons traded Pat Kavanaugh for the 2025 3rd overall pick and Denver's earliest 2026 second round pick.
  1. Cannons → Redwoods (PD). On March 21, the Redwoods traded Owen Grant to the Cannons for the 3rd overall pick and their 2026 4th.
2. No. 5: Chaos → Archers (D). During the 2025 Draft, the Archers traded the 8th and 16th overall picks to the Chaos for the 5th and 21st overall picks.
3. No. 8: Archers → Chaos (D). See pick 5.

===== Second round =====
1. No. 15: Whipsnakes → Waterdogs (PD). On August 6, the Waterdogs traded Ryan Conrad to the Whipsnakes for a 2025 2nd.
2. No. 16: Archers → Chaos (D). See pick 5.

===== Third round =====
1. No. 17: Waterdogs → Whipsnakes (PD). The Whipsnakes traded Zed Williams and the 23rd overall pick to the Waterdogs for Matt Brandau and the 17th overall pick.
2. No. 18: Redwoods → Archers (PD). During the 2024 PLL Draft, the Archers traded the 2024 32nd pick to the Redwoods for their 2025 3rd.
3. No. 20: Cannons → Whipsnakes (PD). On November 28, 2023, the Cannons traded Matt Rees, the 2024 22nd pick, and their 2025 3rd for Connor Kirst and Bryce Young.
4. No. 21: Chaos → Archers. See pick 5.
5. No. 23: Whipsnakes → Waterdogs (PD). See pick 17.
6. No. 24: Archers → Whipsnakes (PD). On August 13, the Whipsnakes traded Jackson Morrill for a 2025 3rd.

===== Fourth round =====
1. No. 26: Redwoods → Outlaws (PD). On March 28, the Outlaws traded Brendan Nichtern to the Redwoods for the 26th overall pick.
2. No. 29: Chaos → Redwoods (PD). On April 9, the Redwoods traded Garrett Degnon to the Chaos for the 29th overall pick.
3. No. 31: Whipsnakes → Redwoods (PD). On June 11, the Redwoods traded Levi Anderson to the Whipsnakes for a 2025 4th.

==== Summary ====
===== Selections by NCAA conference =====
Conference	Round 1	Round 2	Round 3	Round 4	Total
ACC	3	2	2	4	11
Atlantic 10	0	1	1	0	2
Big East	1	1	0	1	3
Big Ten	1	2	2	2	7
Ivy League	3	1	2	1	7
Patriot League	0	0	1	0	1
Non-Division I (Note: Dylan Hess, Florida)	0	1	0	0	1

===== Schools by number of draft selections =====
Selections	Schools
4	Syracuse
3	Notre Dame, Maryland
2	Cornell, Duke, Penn, Penn State, Denver, Virginia
1	Princeton, Georgetown, Saint Joseph's. Yale, Florida, Johns Hopkins, Harvard, Michigan, Richmond, Army

===== Selections by position =====
Position	Round 1	Round 2	Round 3	Round 4	Total
Attack	3	2	1	0	6
Defense	1	1	3	2	7
Defensive Midfield	0	1	1	3	5
Faceoff	0	0	0	0	0
Goalie	0	1	1	0	2
LSM	0	0	2	0	2
Midfield	4	3	0	3	10

=== Mid-season player movement ===
==== Jared Bernhardt ====
On May 29, the PLL reported that former Tewaaraton Award winner, Jared Bernhardt, was meeting with PLL teams to discuss a return to lacrosse. After graduating from Maryland, Bernhardt chose to play football at Ferris State, and pursue his dream of playing in the NFL. After winning the DII National Championship, he signed with the Atlanta Falcons, making their 53-man roster in 2022. Bernhardt appeared in two games before he suffered a groin injury and was placed on IR. He was waived for the final time in 2024.

After meeting with several teams, Bernhardt signed with the Denver Outlaws on June 2nd. He joined fellow Tewaaraton Award winners Logan Wisnauskas, Brennan O'Neill, and Pat Kavanaugh in Denver.

==== Free agency ====
On July 9, Jules Heningburg signed with the Boston Cannons. He spent the 2024 season with the Chaos and was waived after training camp. The four-time All-Star returned to the PLL with 3 points in his debut.

On July 15, Dox Aitken made his return to lacrosse, moving from the hold-out list to the New York Atlas' 25-man roster. Aitken previously chose to pursue football, playing for the semi-pro Ohio Valley Ironmen of the International Football Alliance. On June 26, they canceled the remainder of their season after starting the season 3-0 with a combined score of 166-0.

==== Trades ====
On June 9, the Outlaws traded Sam Handley to the Redwoods for a 2026 third-round pick. The 2023 fourth-overall pick scored 30 points in his first two seasons, but was pushed out of the offensive rotation by the arrival of Jared Bernhardt.

== Tour map ==
Tour locations for the 2025 PLL season
Legend:
: Home-city location
: Neutral-site tour location
: All-Star Game location
: Quarterfinals location
: Semifinals location
: Finals location

== Tour venues ==
Week	Venue	Home team	Location	Capacity (Note: Capacity may not reflect the capacity for the PLL's purposes due to various areas of the stadium potentially being closed for lacrosse games)	Image	Notes	Ref
1	Tom & Mary Casey Stadium	New York Atlas	Albany, NY	8,500			
2	American Legion Memorial Stadium	Carolina Chaos	Charlotte, NC	10,500	Photo of an empty American Legion Memorial Stadium from the top row of a corner section		
3	Villanova Stadium	Philadelphia Waterdogs	Villanova, PA	12,500			
4	Homewood Field	Maryland Whipsnakes	Baltimore, MD	8,500	Photo of an empty Homewood Field set up for lacrosse, taken from the top row of one of the end sections		
5	Torero Stadium	California Redwoods	San Diego, CA	6,000	An aerial photo of an empty Rafferty Stadium		
6 (All-Star Game)	CPKC Stadium	All-Star	Kansas City, MO	11,500	An aerial photo of an empty Rafferty Stadium		
7	Martin Stadium	Neutral Site	Evanston, IL	12,023			
8	Rafferty Stadium	Neutral Site	Fairfield, CT	3,500	An aerial photo of an empty Rafferty Stadium		
9	Zions Bank Stadium	Utah Archers	Herriman, UT	5,000	Photo of the exterior of Zions Bank Stadium		
10	Peter Barton Stadium	Denver Outlaws	Denver, CO	2,000			
11	Harvard Stadium	Boston Cannons	Boston, MA	25,000			
12 (Quarterfinals)	TCO Stadium	Neutral Site	Eagan, MN	6,000			
13 (Semifinals)	Subaru Park	Neutral Site	Chester, PA	18,500			
14 (Championship)	Sports Illustrated Stadium	Neutral Site	Harrison, NJ	25,000			

== Schedule ==
The addition of home cities and conferences brought slight changes to the schedule. Every team has one weekend where they are the home team and play a weekend doubleheader. There are two weekends (Chicago and Fairfield) when there is no home team and every team plays. Each team will play in-conference opponents twice and out-of-conference opponents once. All games are streamed on ESPN+ during the season.

Note: All times in the table below are EDT (UTC−4).

Week	Date	Games	Time	Network (Note: All games streamed on ESPN+ alongside the network listed.)	Venue	City
1 Atlas Homecoming	May 30	Carolina Chaos (8–10) New York Atlas	6 pm	ESPN+	Casey Stadium at UAlbany	Albany, NY
1 Atlas Homecoming	May 30	California Redwoods (15–12) Denver Outlaws	8:30 pm	ESPN+	Casey Stadium at UAlbany	Albany, NY
1 Atlas Homecoming	May 31	Maryland Whipsnakes (7–8) Utah Archers	1 pm	ABC	Casey Stadium at UAlbany	Albany, NY
1 Atlas Homecoming	May 31	Boston Cannons (16–12) New York Atlas	7 pm	ESPN+	Casey Stadium at UAlbany	Albany, NY
2 Chaos Homecoming	June 6	Denver Outlaws (9–12) Carolina Chaos	6 pm	ESPN+	American Legion Memorial Stadium	Charlotte, NC
2 Chaos Homecoming	June 6	Philadelphia Waterdogs (16–12) Maryland Whipsnakes	8:30 pm	ESPN+	American Legion Memorial Stadium	Charlotte, NC
2 Chaos Homecoming	June 7	Utah Archers (8–9) Boston Cannons	1 pm	ABC	American Legion Memorial Stadium	Charlotte, NC
2 Chaos Homecoming	June 7	California Redwoods (16–10) Carolina Chaos	7 pm	ESPN+	American Legion Memorial Stadium	Charlotte, NC
3 Waterdogs Homecoming	June 13	Boston Cannons (11–14) Philadelphia Waterdogs	6 pm	ESPN+	Villanova Stadium	Villanova, PA (Philadelphia metro area)
3 Waterdogs Homecoming	June 13	California Redwoods (11–12) Utah Archers	8:30 pm	ESPN+	Villanova Stadium	Villanova, PA (Philadelphia metro area)
3 Waterdogs Homecoming	June 14	New York Atlas (11–16) Maryland Whipsnakes	1 pm	ABC	Villanova Stadium	Villanova, PA (Philadelphia metro area)
3 Waterdogs Homecoming	June 14	Denver Outlaws (9–7) Philadelphia Waterdogs	7 pm	ESPN+	Villanova Stadium	Villanova, PA (Philadelphia metro area)
4 Whipsnakes Homecoming	June 21	New York Atlas (17–9) Philadelphia Waterdogs	4 pm	ESPN	Homewood Field	Baltimore, MD
4 Whipsnakes Homecoming	June 21	Boston Cannons (13–12) Maryland Whipsnakes	7 pm	ESPN2	Homewood Field	Baltimore, MD
4 Whipsnakes Homecoming	June 22	Utah Archers (10–13) Denver Outlaws	12 noon	ABC	Homewood Field	Baltimore, MD
4 Whipsnakes Homecoming	June 22	Carolina Chaos (6–20) Maryland Whipsnakes	2:30 pm	ESPN+	Homewood Field	Baltimore, MD
5 Redwoods Homecoming	June 27	Denver Outlaws (18–12) California Redwoods	9 pm	ESPN+	Torero Stadium	San Diego, CA
5 Redwoods Homecoming	June 27	Utah Archers (8–10) New York Atlas	11:30 pm	ESPN+	Torero Stadium	San Diego, CA
5 Redwoods Homecoming	June 28	Philadelphia Waterdogs (12–9) California Redwoods	6 pm	ESPN	Torero Stadium	San Diego, CA
5 Redwoods Homecoming	June 28	Boston Cannons (12–14) Carolina Chaos	8:30 pm	ESPN+	Torero Stadium	San Diego, CA
6 Lexus All-Star	July 4	Lexus PLL & WLL Skills Competition	6:30 pm		CPKC Stadium	Kansas City, MO
6 Lexus All-Star	July 4	Maybelline WLL All-Star Game; Team Izzy (24–20) Team North	8 pm	ESPN+	CPKC Stadium	Kansas City, MO
6 Lexus All-Star	July 5	Lexus All-Star Game; East (13–15) West	1 pm	ESPN	CPKC Stadium	Kansas City, MO
7 Throwback Weekend	July 11	New York Atlas (17–11) Boston Cannons	7 pm	ESPN2	Lanny and Sharon Martin Stadium	Evanston, IL (Chicagoland)
7 Throwback Weekend	July 11	Utah Archers (11–16) Philadelphia Waterdogs	9:30 pm	ESPN+	Lanny and Sharon Martin Stadium	Evanston, IL (Chicagoland)
7 Throwback Weekend	July 12	Carolina Chaos (12–10) California Redwoods	7 pm	ESPN+	Lanny and Sharon Martin Stadium	Evanston, IL (Chicagoland)
7 Throwback Weekend	July 12	Denver Outlaws (13–6) Maryland Whipsnakes	9:30 pm	ESPN+	Lanny and Sharon Martin Stadium	Evanston, IL (Chicagoland)
8 Indigenous Heritage Weekend	July 18	New York Atlas (16–12) California Redwoods	6:30 pm	ESPN	Rafferty Stadium	Fairfield, CT
8 Indigenous Heritage Weekend	July 18	Utah Archers (12–11) Carolina Chaos	9 pm	ESPN+	Rafferty Stadium	Fairfield, CT
8 Indigenous Heritage Weekend	July 19	Boston Cannons (17–18) Denver Outlaws	3 pm	ABC	Rafferty Stadium	Fairfield, CT
8 Indigenous Heritage Weekend	July 19	Maryland Whipsnakes (10–7) Philadelphia Waterdogs	8 pm	ESPN+	Rafferty Stadium	Fairfield, CT
9 Archers Homecoming	July 25	California Redwoods (9–8) Utah Archers	8 pm	ESPN+	Zions Bank Stadium	Herriman, UT (Salt Lake City metro area)
9 Archers Homecoming	July 25	Maryland Whipsnakes (8–11) New York Atlas	10:30 pm	ESPN+	Zions Bank Stadium	Herriman, UT (Salt Lake City metro area)
9 Archers Homecoming	July 26	Philadelphia Waterdogs (14–15^{OT}) Carolina Chaos	6:30 pm	ESPN+	Zions Bank Stadium	Herriman, UT (Salt Lake City metro area)
9 Archers Homecoming	July 26	Denver Outlaws (15–10) Utah Archers	9 pm	ESPN2	Zions Bank Stadium	Herriman, UT (Salt Lake City metro area)
10; Outlaws Homecoming	August 1	Carolina Chaos (12–11) Denver Outlaws	8 pm	ESPN+	Peter Barton Stadium	Denver, CO
10; Outlaws Homecoming	August 1	Philadelphia Waterdogs (10–13) Boston Cannons	10:30 pm	ESPN+	Peter Barton Stadium	Denver, CO
10; Outlaws Homecoming	August 2	New York Atlas (12–13^{OT}) Denver Outlaws	1 pm	ESPN+	Peter Barton Stadium	Denver, CO
10; Outlaws Homecoming	August 2	Maryland Whipsnakes (13–14) California Redwoods	8 pm	ABC	Peter Barton Stadium	Denver, CO
11; Cannons Homecoming	August 8	California Redwoods (18–17) Boston Cannons	6:30 pm	ESPN+	Harvard Stadium	Cambridge, MA (Greater Boston)
11; Cannons Homecoming	August 8	Carolina Chaos (10–11) Utah Archers	9 pm	ESPN2	Harvard Stadium	Cambridge, MA (Greater Boston)
11; Cannons Homecoming	August 9	Philadelphia Waterdogs (19–20) New York Atlas	1 pm	ABC	Harvard Stadium	Cambridge, MA (Greater Boston)
11; Cannons Homecoming	August 9	Maryland Whipsnakes (15–8) Boston Cannons	7 pm	ESPN+	Harvard Stadium	Cambridge, MA (Greater Boston)
12; Quarterfinals	August 23	#2 Maryland Whipsnakes (12–14) #3 Philadelphia Waterdogs	6 pm	ESPN2	TCO Stadium	Eagan, MN (Minneapolis–Saint Paul)
12; Quarterfinals	August 23	#2 California Redwoods (14–12) #3 Carolina Chaos	8:30 pm	ESPN+	TCO Stadium	Eagan, MN (Minneapolis–Saint Paul)
13; Semifinals	September 1	#1 New York Atlas (13–11) #3 Philadelphia Waterdogs	12 noon	ESPN+	Subaru Park	Chester, PA (Philadelphia metro area)
13; Semifinals	September 1	#1 Denver Outlaws (12–7) #2 California Redwoods	3:00 pm	ESPN+	Subaru Park	Chester, PA (Philadelphia metro area)
14; PLL U.S. Bank Championship	September 14	#1 New York Atlas (14–13) #1 Denver Outlaws	12:30 pm	ABC	Sports Illustrated Stadium	Harrison, NJ (Metro New York)

Notes

== Regular season standings ==
2025 Eastern Conference standings
Team	W	L	SF	SA	Diff
New York Atlas Y	7	3	137	120	17
Maryland Whipsnakes (Note: Maryland earned the no. 2 seed in the Eastern Conference by virtue of a superior score differential of 11 over Philadelphia and Boston. Philadelphia earned the no. 3 seed by virtue of a superior score differential over Boston, −3 to −11.)	4	6	119	108	11
Philadelphia Waterdogs	4	6	124	127	−3
Boston Cannons	4	6	127	138	−11

2025 Western Conference standings
Team	W	L	SF	SA	Diff
Denver Outlaws Y	7	3	131	113	18
California Redwoods Y (Note: California earned the no. 2 seed in the Western Conference by virtue of a superior score differential over Carolina, −4 to −15.)	5	5	126	130	−4
Carolina Chaos Y	5	5	110	125	−15
Utah Archers	4	6	98	111	−13

Notes

Top team in each conference received a first-round bye
Top three teams in each conference qualified for the playoffs
Last-place team in each conference missed the playoffs
Y = Qualified for the 2026 Championship Series

Source: Standings - Premier Lacrosse League

== Postseason ==
=== Bracket ===
Quarterfinals; August 23 (Eagan, MN)
#2	Whipsnakes	12
#3	Waterdogs	14
#2	Redwoods	14
#3	Chaos	12

Semifinals; September 1 (Chester, PA)
#1	Atlas	13
#3	Waterdogs	11
#1	Outlaws	12
#2	Redwoods	7

PLL Championship Game; September 14 (Harrison, NJ)
#1	Atlas	14
#1	Outlaws	13

== Regular-season statistical leaders ==
Individual
Statistic	Player	Position	Team
Points	Connor Shellenberger (46)	Attack	New York Atlas
One-point goals	Dylan Molloy (26)	Attack	California Redwoods
Two-point goals	Marcus Holman (5)	Attack	Boston Cannons
Scoring Points	Dylan Molloy (27)	Attack	California Redwoods
Assists	Asher Nolting (26)	Attack	Boston Cannons
Shots	Pat Kavanagh (90)	Attack	Denver Outlaws
Shot Percentage	Reid Bowering (50%)	Midfield	New York Atlas
Touches	Pat Kavanagh (454)	Attack	Denver Outlaws
Faceoff Percentage	Justin Inacio (60.9%)	Face-off	Carolina Chaos
Save Percentage	Austin Kaut (62.5%)	Goaltender	Carolina Chaos
Caused Turnovers	Ajax Zappitello (17)	Defense	Maryland Whipsnakes
Groundballs	Trevor Baptiste (87)	Faceoff	New York Atlas

Team
Statistic	Team
Offensive
Scores per Game	New York Atlas (13.7)
Shots per Game	Denver Outlaws (45.5)
Shot Percentage	New York Atlas (30.4%)
One-point goals	New York Atlas (123)
Two-point goals	Boston Cannons and Denver Outlaws (12)
Turnovers (High)	New York Atlas (195)
Turnovers (Low)	Boston Cannons (156)
Defensive
Scores Against Average (Low)	Maryland Whipsnakes (10.8)
Scores Against Average (High)	Boston Cannons (13.8)
Two-point Goals Against (Low)	Maryland Whipsnakes (7)
Two-point Goals Against (High)	Philadelphia Waterdogs (15)
Caused Turnovers	Boston Cannons (81)
Groundballs Recovered	New York Atlas (355)
Saves Per Game	Boston Cannons (13.8)
Save Percentage	Utah Archers (59.1%)
Power Play and Penalty Kill
Power-play Goal Percentage	Boston Cannons (42.1%)
Power-play Goals	New York Atlas (10)
Penalty-kill Percentage	New York Atlas (79.2%)
Penalty Kills	Boston Cannons (33)
Penalties (Low)	Maryland Whipsnakes (19)
Penalties (High)	Boston Cannons (34)
Penalty Minutes (Low)	Maryland Whipsnakes (12)
Penalty Minutes (High)	Boston Cannons (27.5)

== Awards ==
=== Players of the Week ===
Date Awarded	Player	Team	Ref.
June 3	Chris Kavanagh	California Redwoods	
June 10	Blaze Riorden	Carolina Chaos	
June 17	Michael Sowers	Philadelphia Waterdogs	
June 24	Jeff Teat	New York Atlas	
June 30	Pat Kavanagh	Denver Outlaws	
July 5	Brennan O'Neill	West	
July 15	Connor Shellenberger	New York Atlas	
July 22	Connor Shellenberger (2)	New York Atlas	
July 29	Brennan O'Neill	Denver Outlaws	
August 5	Chris Kavanagh (2)	California Redwoods	
August 12	Connor Shellenberger (3)	New York Atlas	
August 26	Michael Sowers (2)	Philadelphia Waterdogs	
September 3	Liam Entenmann	New York Atlas	
September 14	Jeff Teat (2)	New York Atlas	

=== Individual Season Awards ===
On August 18, the PLL announced the finalists for its 2025 end-of-season awards via social media platforms.

==== List of awards and finalists ====
The winner of the award are highlighted in bold.

===== Jim Brown Most Valuable Player =====
- Pat Kavanagh (Denver Outlaws)
- Brennan O'Neill (Denver Outlaws)
- **Connor Shellenberger** (New York Atlas)
- Michael Sowers (Philadelphia Waterdogs)

===== Eamon McEneaney Attackman of the Year =====
- Pat Kavanagh (Denver Outlaws)
- Brennan O'Neill (Denver Outlaws)
- **Connor Shellenberger** (New York Atlas)
- Michael Sowers (Philadelphia Waterdogs)

===== Gait Brothers Midfielder of the Year =====
- **Matt Campbell** (Boston Cannons)
- Jared Bernhardt (Denver Outlaws)
- Bryan Costabile (New York Atlas)
- Andrew McAdorey (California Redwoods)

===== Dave Pietramala Defensive Player of the Year =====
- Graeme Hossack (Utah Archers)
- JT Giles-Harris (Denver Outlaws)
- **Gavin Adler** (New York Atlas)
- Jack Rowlett (Carolina Chaos)

===== Oren Lyons Goalie of the Year =====
- Liam Entenmann (New York Atlas)
- **Logan McNaney** (Denver Outlaws)
- Blaze Riorden (Carolina Chaos)

===== Paul Cantabene Face-Off Athlete of the Year =====
- Trevor Baptiste (New York Atlas)
- Joe Nardella (Maryland Whipsnakes)
- **TD Ierlan** (California Redwoods)

===== Brodie Merrill Long Stick Midfielder of the Year =====
- **Jake Piseno** (Denver Outlaws)
- Troy Reh (Carolina Chaos)
- Mason Woodward (Utah Archers)

===== George Boiardi Hard Hat Award - Awarded to the SSDM of the year =====
- Brian Tevlin (California Redwoods)
- **Ryan Terefenko** (Denver Outlaws)
- Danny Logan (New York Atlas)
- Dylan Hess (Philadelphia Waterdogs)

===== Rookie of the Year =====
- **Chris Kavanagh** (California Redwoods)
- Logan McNaney (Denver Outlaws)
- Owen Hiltz (Carolina Chaos)
- Aidan Carroll (Maryland Whipsnakes)

===== Comeback Player of the Year =====
- Jack Kielty (Boston Cannons)
- **Dylan Molloy** (California Redwoods)
- Brad Smith (Maryland Whipsnakes)

===== Dick Edell Coach of the Year =====
- **Tim Soudan** (Denver Outlaws)
- Mike Pressler (New York Atlas)
- Anthony Kelly (California Redwoods)

===== Dave Huntley Sportsmanship Award =====
- Ryan Ambler (Utah Archers)
- **Joe Nardella** (Maryland Whipsnakes)
- Mark Glicini (Carolina Chaos)

===== Welles Crowther Humanitarian Award =====
- Jake Piseno (Denver Outlaws)
- **Romar Dennis** (California Redwoods)
- Piper Bond (Utah Archers)

===== Jimmy Regan Teammate Award =====
- **Brian Tevlin** (California Redwoods)
- Trevor Baptiste (New York Atlas)
- Austin Kaut (Carolina Chaos)

===== Brendan Looney Leadership Award =====
- Mike Manley (Denver Outlaws)
- Matt Dunn (Maryland Whipsnakes)
- **Blaze Riorden** (Carolina Chaos)

=== Team ===
Award		Attack			Faceoff	Midfield		
**All-Pro Offensive**	**First Team**	**Connor Shellenberger** (New York Atlas)	Michael Sowers (Philadelphia Waterdogs)	Brennan O'Neill (Denver Outlaws)	**TD Ierlan** (California Redwoods)	**Matt Campbell** (Boston Cannons)	Jared Bernhardt (Denver Outlaws)	Andrew McAdorey (California Redwoods)
**All-Pro Offensive**	**Second Team**	Jeff Teat (New York Atlas)	Chris Kavanagh (California Redwoods)	Pat Kavanagh (Denver Outlaws)	Trevor Baptiste (New York Atlas)	Bryan Costabile (New York Atlas)	Matt Brandau (Maryland Whipsnakes)	Zach Currier (Philadelphia Waterdogs)
Award		Defense			LSM	SSDM		Goalie
**All-Pro Defensive**	**First Team**	**Gavin Adler** (New York Atlas)	Graeme Hossack (Utah Archers)	JT Giles-Harris (Denver Outlaws)	**Jake Piseno** (Denver Outlaws)	Danny Logan (New York Atlas)	**Ryan Terefenko** (Denver Outlaws)	Liam Entenmann (New York Atlas)
**All-Pro Defensive**	**Second Team**	Matt Dunn (Maryland Whipsnakes)	Ajax Zappitello (Maryland Whipsnakes)	Jack Rowlett (Carolina Chaos)	Troy Reh (Carolina Chaos)	Dylan Hess (Philadelphia Waterdogs)	Brian Tevlin (California Redwoods)	**Logan McNaney** (Denver Outlaws)

== Coaching changes ==
=== Off-season changes ===
On December 5, 2024, Andy Towers resigned as head coach of the Carolina Chaos, over disputes with the PLL. He was replaced by Roy Colsey on January 30, 2025.

In March 2025, Nat St. Laurent stepped down as head coach of the California Redwoods. He was replaced by Anthony Kelly on March 20, 2025.
