= California Redwoods (lacrosse) =

Lacrosse team in California, US

- Full name: California Redwoods Lacrosse Club
- Sport: Field lacrosse
- Founded: 2019
- League: Premier Lacrosse League
- Team history: Redwoods Lacrosse Club (2019-23); California Redwoods (2024-present)
- Based in: San Diego, California
- Stadium: Torero Stadium
- Colors
- Head coach: Anthony Kelly
- General manager: Joe Spallina
- Championships: None
- Website: California Redwoods

The California Redwoods are a professional field lacrosse team based in San Diego, California, that competes in the Premier Lacrosse League (PLL). The team plays its home games at Torero Stadium. The Redwoods began play in the league's inaugural 2019 season.

== History ==
Following the assignment of home markets for the 2024 season, the team was rebranded as the California Redwoods. On January 1, 2024, the PLL revealed the Redwoods would be based in San Diego, hosting their homecoming weekend at Torero Stadium.

== Roster ==
2025 California Redwoods
#	Name	Nationality	Position	Shot	Height	Weight	College	Grad year	High school	Hometown	Ref.
2	Andrew McAdorey	(United States)	Midfield	R/L	5 ft 8 in	190 lbs	Duke	2025	St. Anthony's	Manorville, New York	
3	Carter Rice	(United States)	SSDM	Left	5 ft 11 in	191 lbs	Syracuse	2025	Boston College High School	Milton, Massachusetts	
4	Dylan Molloy	(United States)	Attack	Right	6 ft 0 in	215 lbs	Brown	2017	St. Anthony's	Setauket, New York	
6	TD Ierlan (C)	(United States)	Faceoff	Right	5 ft 9 in	190 lbs	Denver	2021	Victor	Victor, New York	
7	Michael Leo	(United States)	Midfield	Left	5 ft 10 in	190 lbs	Syracuse	2026	St. Anthony's	Seaford, New York	
9	Cullen Brown	(United States)	Defense	Right	6 ft 4 in	190 lbs	Ohio State	2026	Landon	Silver Spring, Maryland	
12	Brian Tevlin (C)	(United States)	SSDM	Right	5 ft 11 in	190 lbs	Notre Dame	2023	Seton Hall Prep	Livingston, New Jersey	
13	Marcus Wertheim	(Australia)	Midfield	Right	6 ft 0 in	190 lbs	Brown	2026	Smithtown East	St. James, New York	
14	Wes Berg	(Canada)	Attack	Right	6 ft 2 in	205 lbs	Denver	2015	Dr. Charles Best	Coquitlam, British Columbia	
15	Sam English	(Canada)	Midfield	Right	5 ft 11 in	169 lbs	Syracuse	2025	Culver Academy	Burlington, Ontario	
17	Finn Thomson	(Canada)	Attack	Right	6 ft 2 in	170 lbs	Syracuse	2026	St. Michael's	Toronto, Ontario	
20	Chris Conlin	(United States)	Defense	Left	6 ft 2 in	210 lbs	Notre Dame	2024	Chatham	Chatham, New Jersey	
23	Chris Merle (C)	(United States)	SSDM	Right	6 ft 1 in	200 lbs	Virginia	2021	Westhampton Beach	Westhampton Beach, New York	
24	Dante Bowen	(Jamaica)	SSDM	Right	6 ft 1 in	205 lbs	Syracuse	2026	David Suzuki	Brampton, Ontario	
26	Ryan Croddick	(United States)	Goalie	Right	6 ft 3 in	185 lbs	Princeton	2026	Hun School	Rumson, New Jersey	
28	Jared Conners	(United States)	LSM	Right	6 ft 5 in	215 lbs	Virginia	2021	Pittsford	Pittsford, New York	
31	Chris Fake	(United States)	Defense	Right	6 ft 1 in	220 lbs	Yale	2023	Hun School	Allentown, New Jersey	
34	Josh Balcarcel	(Puerto Rico)	Midfield	Left	5 ft 7 in	175 lbs	Marist	2025	Delaware Valley	Milford, Pennsylvania	
37	Dillon Ward	(Canada)	Goalie	Right	6 ft 5 in	220 lbs	Bellarmine	2013	The Hill Academy	Orangeville, Ontario	
39	Cole Kastner	(United States)	Defense	Right	6 ft 7 in	215 lbs	Virginia	2024	Menlo School	Palo Alto, California	
40	Arden Cohen	(United States)	LSM	Left	6 ft 2 in	220 lbs	Notre Dame	2022	Darien	New York, New York	
50	Ryder Garnsey (C)	(United States)	Attack	Left	5 ft 9 in	180 lbs	Notre Dame	2019	Brewster Academy	Wolfeboro, New Hampshire	
70	BJ Farrare	(United States)	SSDM/LSM	Left	5 ft 8 in	175 lbs	Penn	2023	McDonogh	Owings Mills, Maryland	
81	Kyle Hartzell	(United States)	LSM	Right	6 ft 1 in	195 lbs	Salisbury	2008	Archbishop Curley	Dundalk, Maryland	
88	Aidan Danenza	(United States)	Midfield	Right	6 ft 3 in	220 lbs	Duke	2024	St. Anthony's	Muttontown, New York	
96	Chris Kavanagh	(United States)	Attack	Right	5 ft 10 in	180 lbs	Notre Dame	2025	Taft	Rockville Centre, New York	

*Indicates player is on Unable to Travel list

**Indicates player is on injured reserve

^Indicates player is on holdout list

(C) Indicates captain

(R) indicates rookie

=== Coaching staff ===
- Head coach – Anthony Kelly
- Assistant coach – Chris Collins
- Assistant coach – Chris Bocklet

== All-time draft selections ==
2019

Rnd.	Pick #	Player	Pos.	College	Conf.	2019 Accolades
1	5	Clarke Petterson	Attack	Cornell	Ivy League	Honorable Mention All-American, Second-Team Ivy League
2	8	Tyler Dunn	Midfield	Penn	Ivy League	Honorable Mention All-American, First-Team Ivy League
3	17	Brendan Gleason	Attack	Notre Dame	Atlantic Coast Conference	Honorable Mention All-American, First-Team ACC
4	20	Tim Troutner	Goalie	High Point	Southern Conference	Second-Team All-American, First-Team SoCon
Undrafted	FA	Ryder Garnsey	Attack	Notre Dame	Atlantic Coast Conference	2018 Accolades (Suspended most of 2019): Honorable Mention All-American

2020 Entry Draft

The 2020 player entry draft occurred on March 16 for teams to select players arriving from rival Major League Lacrosse. On March 4, Paul Burmeister and NBCSN hosted an entry draft lottery for selection order. Out of 100 balls to select from, Waterdogs had 40, Chrome had 25, Atlas had 15, Archers had 10, Chaos had 6, Redwoods had 3, and the champion Whipsnakes had 1.

Rob Pannell was announced to be transferring to the PLL on March 9, followed by 15 other players the following day, which comprised the selection pool for the entry draft. A total of 14 players were selected in the entry draft with remaining new players entering the league player pool.

Draft results
Rnd.	Pick #	Player	Pos.	College
1	6	Finn Sullivan	Defense	Hofstra
2	13	Greg Puskuldjian	Faceoff	Adelphi

2020 College Draft

Rnd.	Pick #	Player	Pos.	College
1	6	Peyton Smith	Faceoff	Marist
2	13	Chris Price	Defense	High Point

2021 Entry Draft

Draft results
Rnd.	Pick #	Player	Pos.	College
2	11	Ryan Lee	Attack	RIT
3	19	Isiah Davis-Allen	SSDM	Maryland

2021 College Draft

Draft results
Rnd.	Pick #	Player	Pos.	College
1	4	TD Ierlan	Faceoff	Denver
3	24	Charlie Bertrand	Midfield	Virginia
4	29	Jamie Trimboli	Midfield	Syracuse
4	32	Charlie Leonard	Faceoff	Notre Dame

2022 College Draft

Rnd.	Pick #	Player	Pos.	College
1	3	Arden Cohen	Defense	Notre Dame
3	19	Nakeie Montgomery	Midfield	Duke
4	27	Mitch Bartolo	Attack	Rutgers

2023 College Draft

Rnd.	Pick #	Player	Pos.	College
1	2	Owen Grant	Defense	Delaware
2	10	Brian Tevlin	Midfield	Notre Dame
3	18	Cole Kirst	Midfield	Syracuse
4	26	Zach Cole	Faceoff	Saint Joseph's

2024 College Draft

Rnd.	Pick #	Player	Pos.	College
3	18	Garrett Degnon	Attack	Johns Hopkins
3	21	Levi Anderson	Attack	St Joseph's
4	29	Chayse Ierlan	Goalie	Johns Hopkins
4	32	Cole Kastner	Defense	Virginia

2025 College Draft

Rnd.	Pick #	Player	Pos.	College
1	2	Andrew McAdorey	Midfield	Duke
1	3	Sam English	Midfield	Syracuse
2	10	Chris Kavanagh	Attack	Notre Dame
4	29	Carter Rice	Defensive Midfield	Syracuse
4	31	Griffin Schutz	Midfield	Virginia

== Season results ==
2019
Week	Location	Date	Opponent	Result
1	Boston, Massachusetts	June 2, 2019	Atlas	W 11–9
2	New York, New York	June 8, 2019	Archers	L 9–10
3	Chicago, Illinois	June 15, 2019	Chaos	L 11–12 (OT)
4	Baltimore, Maryland	June 22, 2019	Chrome	W 13–11
5	Atlanta, Georgia	June 29, 2019	Whipsnakes	W 14–11
6	Washington, DC	July 6, 2019	Archers	W 9-8 (OT)
All-Star Break	Los Angeles, California	July 21, 2019	Bye	Bye
7	Denver, Colorado	July 27, 2019	Atlas	L 15–18
8	San Jose, California	August 10, 2019	Chaos	L 10–13
9	Hamilton, Ontario	August 18, 2019	Whipsnakes	L 4–17
10	Albany, New York	August 24, 2019	Chrome	W 18-7
Playoffs Round 1	Columbus, Ohio	September 6, 2019	Archers	W 16–12
Playoffs Round 2	New York, New York	September 14, 2019	Chaos	W 12-7
Finals	Philadelphia, Pennsylvania	September 21, 2019	Whipsnakes	L 11-12 (OT)

2020
Game	Location	Date	Opponent	Result
1	Herriman, Utah	July 25, 2020	Whipsnakes	L 9–13
2	Herriman, Utah	July 28, 2020	Chrome	L 11–12
3	Herriman, Utah	July 29, 2020	Chaos	W 8–7
4	Herriman, Utah	August 1, 2020	Atlas	W 11–10
5 (Elimination)	Herriman, Utah	August 4, 2020	Waterdogs	W 11–8
6 (Semifinal)	Herriman, Utah	August 6, 2020	Whipsnakes	L 12–13

2021
Game	Location	Date	Opponent	Result
1	Foxborough, Massachusetts	June 4, 2021	Cannons	W 12–11
2	Foxborough, Massachusetts	June 6, 2021	Chrome	W 14–11
3	Kennesaw, Georgia	June 12, 2021	Atlas	L 9–12
4	Baltimore, Maryland	June 26, 2021	Chaos	L 9–11
5	Hempstead, New York	July 3, 2021	Waterdogs	W 19–16
6	Eagan, Minnesota	July 10, 2021	Whipsnakes	W 13–7
7	Colorado Springs, Colorado	July 31, 2021	Archers	L 12–15
8	Albany, New York	August 13, 2021	Whipsnakes	L 12–14
9	Albany, New York	August 15, 2021	Chaos	W 10–9
10 (Quarterfinal)	Sandy, Utah	August 21, 2021	Whipsnakes	L 13–14

2022
Game	Location	Date	Opponent	Result
1	Albany, New York	June 4	Atlas	L 11–17
2	Charlotte, North Carolina	June 10	Chrome	L 3–12
3	Hempstead, New York	June 18	Chaos	W 11–7
4	Baltimore, Maryland	June 24	Whipsnakes	L 11–12
5	Eagan, Minnesota	July 1	Archers	L 9–10
6	Fairfield, Connecticut	July 23	Atlas	W 16–15
7	Frisco, Texas	July 31	Chaos	L 12–14
8	Denver, Colorado	August 5	Cannons	W 15–12
9	Herriman, Utah	August 12	Waterdogs	W 14–12
10	Tacoma, Washington	August 20	Chrome	L 12–13
11 (Quarterfinal)	Foxborough, Massachusetts	September 3	Archers	L 8–13

2023
Game	Location	Date	Opponent	Result
1	Albany, New York	June 3	Atlas	W 13–12
2	Charlotte, North Carolina	June 9	Waterdogs	W 10–9
3	Columbus, Ohio	June 17	Whipsnakes	L 11–18
4	Eagan, Minnesota	July 9	Chaos	W 13–8
5	Fairfield, Connecticut	July 14	Archers	L 3–10
6	Frisco, Texas	July 29	Cannons	L 10–16
7	Baltimore, Maryland	August 6	Chaos	L 12–14
8	Denver, Colorado	August 12	Cannons	W 16–15 (OT)
9	Tacoma, Washington	August 19	Chrome	W 11–10 (OT)
10	Herriman, Utah	August 25	Atlas	W 12–7
11 (Quarterfinal)	Foxborough, Massachusetts	September 4	Chaos	W 15–9
12 (Semifinal)	Uniondale, New York	September 10	Archers	L 6–14

2024 Championship Series
Game	Location	Date	Opponent	Result
1	Springfield, VA	February 15	Cannons	W 26–25
2	Springfield, VA	February 16	Waterdogs	L 14–20
3	Springfield, VA	February 17	Archers	W 18–16
4 (Semifinals)	Springfield, VA	February 18	Cannons	L 15–23

2024
Game	Location	Date	Opponent	Result
1	Charlotte, North Carolina	June 7	Chaos	L 11–12
2	Villanova, Pennsylvania	June 16	Atlas	L 15–20
3	Eagan, Minnesota	June 29	Outlaws	L 8–13
4	Cambridge, Massachusetts	July 5	Cannons	W 9–7
5	Fairfield, Connecticut	July 20	Archers	L 8–15
6	San Diego, California	July 27	Chaos	W 10–8
7	San Diego, California	July 28	Whipsnakes	L 13–18
8	Baltimore, Maryland	August 3	Outlaws	L 5–18
9	Denver, Colorado	August 9	Waterdogs	W 13–12
10	Herriman, Utah	August 16	Archers	L 12–13

2025
Game	Location	Date	Opponent	Result
1	Albany, New York	May 30	Outlaws	W 15–12
2	Charlotte, North Carolina	June 7	Chaos	W 16–10
3	Villanova, Pennsylvania	June 13	Archers	L 11–12
4	San Diego, California	June 27	Outlaws	L 12–18
5	San Diego, California	June 28	Waterdogs	L 9–12
6	Evanston, Illinois	July 12	Chaos	L 10–12
7	Fairfield, Connecticut	July 18	Atlas	L 12–16
8	Herriman, Utah	July 25	Archers	W 9–8
9	Denver, Colorado	August 2	Whipsnakes	W 14–13
10	Cambridge, Massachusetts	August 8	Cannons	W 18–17
11 (Quarterfinal)	Eagan, Minnesota	August 23	Chaos	W 14–12
12 (Semifinal)	Chester, Pennsylvania	September 1	Outlaws	L 7–12

2026 Championship Series
Game	Location	Date	Opponent	Result
1	Springfield, VA	February 28	Outlaws	W 26–14
2	Springfield, VA	March 1	Chaos	W 23–21
3	Springfield, VA	March 6	Atlas	W 23–22
4 (Finals)	Springfield, VA	March 8	Chaos	L 16–24

== PLL award winners ==
Rookie of the Year

- Tim Troutner: 2019
- Chris Kavanagh: 2025

Dave Pietramala Defensive Player of the Year

- Garrett Epple: 2023

Paul Cantabene Face-Off Athlete of the Year

- TD Ierlan: 2025

George Boiardi Short Stick Defensive Midfielder of the Year

- Brian Tevlin: 2026

Comeback Player of the Year

- Dylan Molloy: 2025

Brendan Looney Leadership Award

- Kyle Harrison: 2019, 2021

Jimmy Regan Teammate of the Year

- Jack Kelly: 2021
- Cole Kirst: 2023
- Brian Tevlin: 2025

Welles Crowther Humanitarian Award

- Romar Dennis: 2024, 2025

== Head coaches ==
#	Name	Term	Regular season				Playoffs			
#	Name	Term	GP	W	L	Pct	GP	W	L	Pct
1	Nat St. Laurent	2019-2024	53	25	28	.472	9	4	5	.444
2	Anthony Kelly	2025 - Current	10	5	5	.500	2	1	1	.500

== All-time record vs. PLL clubs ==
Opponent	Won	Lost	Percentage	Streak
Archers	3	9	.250	Won 1
Atlas	6	4	.600	Won 1
Cannons	5	1	.833	Won 3
Chaos	9	7	.563	Won 1
Outlaws	5	7	.417	Lost 2
Waterdogs	5	1	.833	Lost 1
Whipsnakes	3	9	.250	Won 1
Totals	36	38	.486	
