= Kyle Hartzell =

American lacrosse player (born 1985)

Personal information
- Nationality: United States
- Born: October 9, 1985 (age 41) Baltimore, Maryland
- Height: 6 ft 1 in (185 cm)
- Weight: 195 lb (88 kg; 13 st 13 lb)

Sport
- Position: Defenseman; LSM
- Shoots: Right
- NCAA team: Salisbury University (2008)
- NLL teams: San Jose Stealth; Washington Stealth; Philadelphia Wings; San Diego Seals
- MLL teams: San Francisco Dragons; Washington Bayhawks; Chesapeake Bayhawks; Ohio Machine; New York Lizards
- PLL team Former teams: California Redwoods; Atlas LC; Cannons LC
- Pro career: 2008–

Career highlights
- MLL: 6x All-Star (2011, 2012, 2013, 2014, 2015, 2018); PLL: 1x All-Star (2019)
Medal record
Representing United States
Men's lacrosse
World Lacrosse Championship
Winner	2018 Netanya
Runner-up	2014 Denver
World Indoor Lacrosse Championship
Third place	2011 Prague

Kyle Hartzell (born September 10, 1985) is an American professional lacrosse player, currently playing with the California Redwoods of the Premier Lacrosse League. He was the Head Lacrosse Coach for the University of Texas at Austin until 2025. He graduated from Salisbury University (D3) in 2007. Hartzell previously played for the Atlas Lacrosse Club of the Premier Lacrosse League. Kyle is playing for the NLL Expansion Team the San Diego Seals Kyle Hartzell has also played professional lacrosse for Washington, Chesapeake, Ohio, and New York in the Major League Lacrosse. Hartzell had a career high 11 goals in 2012 as a part of the Ohio Machine, as well as 22 total caused turnovers. Known for his flashy over-the-head and rusty gate checks and his outspoken personality, Hartzell has become one of the most well-known defensive players in lacrosse.

== Playing career ==
Raised in Dundalk, Maryland Hartzell primarily played soccer growing up and only began playing lacrosse as a freshman in high school, originally as an attackman. He was not recruited out of high school, first attending CCBC-Essex, where he started as a midfielder before switching to LSM. He won an NJCAA Championship in 2004, then transferring to Salisbury University, where he walked on to the lacrosse team. At Salisbury, Hartzell did not play much until his senior season, switching between midfield and defense before finding his role as a full time defenseman his senior year. He would captain the Gulls to a 23-0 season and national championship, finishing the season with 42 caused turnovers and 83 ground balls, while being named team defensive MVP, first team all league, and third team All-American.

Professionally, Hartzell has played in MLL for the San Francisco Dragons, Washington/Chesapeake Bayhawks, Ohio Machine, and New York Lizards, in NLL with the San Jose/Washington Stealth, Philadelphia Wings, and San Diego Seals, and in the PLL for Atlas Lacrosse Club and Redwoods Lacrosse Club. He won MLL championships in 2010 with Chesapeake and 2015 with New York, as well as an NLL championship in 2010 with Washington.

Internationally, Hartzell has represented the United States three times, once in box and twice in field. He won a bronze medal at the 2011 World Indoor Lacrosse Championship, a silver at the 2014 World Lacrosse Championship, and a gold at the 2018 World Lacrosse Championship.

Hartzell announced his retirement from professional lacrosse on September 18, 2023. He finished his career with 89 points between MLL and PLL, the fourth most of any longpole in history.

Hartzell came out of retirement to play for the California Redwoods in the 2026 season amidst an injury crisis among their defense.

== Coaching career ==
On April 11, 2024, Hartzell was hired as an assistant coach and defensive coordinator by the Boston Cannons, the rebranded Cannons Lacrosse Club.

== Stats ==
=== MLL ===
Season	Team	Regular season											Playoffs										
Season	Team	GP	G	2PG	A	Pts	Sh	GB	Pen	PIM	FOW	FOA	GP	G	2PG	A	Pts	Sh	GB	Pen	PIM	FOW	FOA
2008	San Francisco Dragons	10	0	0	2	2	3	31	0	6	0	0	–	–	–	–	–	–	–	–	–	–	–
2009	Washington Bayhawks	9	0	0	0	0	2	25	0	5.5	0	0	–	–	–	–	–	–	–	–	–	–	–
2010	Chesapeake Bayhawks	9	1	0	0	1	1	19	0	3	0	0	2	0	0	0	0	0	1	0	0.5	0	0
2011	Chesapeake Bayhawks	11	3	2	0	5	9	27	0	4.5	0	0	1	0	0	0	0	1	4	0	0	0	0
2012	Ohio Machine	14	11	9	1	21	42	60	0	3	0	0	–	–	–	–	–	–	–	–	–	–	–
2013	Ohio Machine	14	6	0	3	9	33	55	0	4	0	1	–	–	–	–	–	–	–	–	–	–	–
2014	New York Lizards	13	9	2	1	12	26	50	0	3.5	2	4	1	0	0	0	0	2	2	0	1	0	0
2015	New York Lizards	11	2	1	4	7	16	24	0	3.5	0	2	2	0	0	0	0	0	6	0	0	0	0
2016	New York Lizards	14	3	2	2	7	23	46	0	4	0	4	1	1	1	0	2	3	2	0	0	0	0
2017	New York Lizards	14	1	1	1	3	15	34	0	5.5	0	0	–	–	–	–	–	–	–	–	–	–	–
2018	New York Lizards	12	4	0	2	6	20	23	0	9	0	0	1	0	0	0	0	1	3	0	0	0	0
		131	40	17	16	73	190	394	0	51.5	2	11	8	1	1	0	2	7	18	0	1.5	0	0
Career total:		139	41	18	16	75	197	412	0	53	2	11											

GP–Games played; G–Goals; 2PG–2-point goals; A–Assists; Pts–Points; Sh–Shots; GB–Ground balls; Pen–Penalties; PIM–Penalty minutes; FOW–Faceoffs won; FOA–Faceoffs attempted

=== PLL ===
Season	Team	Regular season											Playoffs										
Season	Team	GP	G	2PG	A	Pts	Sh	GB	Pen	PIM	FOW	FOA	GP	G	2PG	A	Pts	Sh	GB	Pen	PIM	FOW	FOA
2019	Atlas	10	2	0	6	8	14	16	0	0	1	2	2	0	0	0	0	1	5	0	0	0	0
2020	Atlas	5	0	0	0	0	4	7	1	1	0	0	–	–	–	–	–	–	–	–	–	–	–
2021	Redwoods	3	0	0	1	1	1	2	1	1	2	4	1	0	0	0	0	0	0	0	0	0	0
2022	Redwoods	8	2	1	0	3	4	9	1	1	0	0	1	0	0	0	0	0	1	0	0	0	0
2023	Cannons	5	0	0	0	0	1	7	2	1	2	18	2	1	0	1	2	2	4	1	2	1	15
2026	California Redwoods	3	0	0	0	0	3	5	0	0	0	0	–	–	–	–	–	–	–	–	–	–	–
		34	4	1	7	12	27	46	5	4	5	24	6	1	0	1	2	3	10	1	2	1	15
Career total:		40	5	1	8	14	30	56	6	6	6	39											

GP–Games played; G–Goals; 2PG–2-point goals; A–Assists; Pts–Points; Sh–Shots; GB–Ground balls; Pen–Penalties; PIM–Penalty minutes; FOW–Faceoffs won; FOA–Faceoffs attempted

=== NLL ===
Kyle Hartzell		Regular season									Playoffs								
Season	Team	GP	G	A	Pts	LB	PIM	Pts/GP	LB/GP	PIM/GP	GP	G	A	Pts	LB	PIM	Pts/GP	LB/GP	PIM/GP
2008-09	San Jose Stealth	12	1	8	9	86	11	0.75	7.17	0.92	–	–	–	–	–	–	–	–	–
2009-10	Washington Stealth	9	1	1	2	49	2	0.22	5.44	0.22	3	0	0	0	14	0	0.00	4.67	0.00
2010-11	Washington Stealth	15	3	3	6	53	9	0.40	3.53	0.60	–	–	–	–	–	–	–	–	–
2011-12	Washington Stealth	13	0	4	4	41	4	0.31	3.15	0.31	–	–	–	–	–	–	–	–	–
2012-13	Philadelphia Wings	16	4	7	11	80	6	0.69	5.00	0.38	1	0	0	0	1	0	0.00	1.00	0.00
2018-19	San Diego Seals	10	1	1	2	53	6	0.20	5.30	0.60	1	0	0	0	2	2	0.00	2.00	2.00
		75	10	24	34	362	38	0.45	4.83	0.51	5	0	0	0	17	2	0.00	3.40	0.40
Career Total:		80	10	24	34	379	40	0.43	4.74	0.50									

GP–Games played; G–Goals; A–Assists; Pts–Points; LB–Loose balls; PIM–Penalty minutes; Pts/GP–Points per games played; LB/GP–Loose balls per games played; PIM/GP–Penalty minutes per games played.
