= Philadelphia Waterdogs =

Field lacrosse team in the PLL

- Full name: Philadelphia Waterdogs
- Founded: 2020
- League: Premier Lacrosse League
- Based in: Philadelphia, Pennsylvania
- Stadium: Subaru Park
- Colors
- Head coach: Bill Tierney
- General manager: Dave Cottle
- Championships: 2 (2022, 2026)
- Website: Philadelphia Waterdogs

The Philadelphia Waterdogs are a professional field lacrosse team based in the Philadelphia metropolitan area that competes in the Premier Lacrosse League (PLL). The Waterdogs were the first PLL expansion team, beginning with the 2020 season. Players were selected through an expansion draft, new entry draft, and the college draft over the first few months of 2020. Andy Copelan was announced as the club's first head coach on January 2, 2020. Owners of the club include Pardon My Take hosts, Dan "Big Cat" Katz & PFT Commenter. The Waterdogs won their first championship in 2022 against the Chaos. In March 2024 the Waterdogs hired Bill Tierney as head coach.

== Current coaching staff ==
- Head coach – Bill Tierney
- Assistant coach – Dylan Sheridan
- Assistant coach – Louie Dedonatis

== Roster ==
2026 Philadelphia Waterdogs
#	Name	Nationality	Position	Shot	Height	Weight	College	Grad Year	High School	Hometown	Ref
1	Matt DeLuca	(Italy)	Goalie	Right	6 ft 6 in	215 lbs	Delaware	2020	Farmingdale	Farmingdale, New York	
2	Casey Wilson	(Canada)	Midfield	Right	6 ft 1 in	205 lbs	Denver	2025	Claremont	Victoria, British Columbia	
3	Jack Hannah	(United States)	Midfield	Right	6 ft 1 in	205 lbs	Denver	2022	Milford	Milford, Ohio	
4	Ben Wayer	(United States)	LSM	Right	6 ft 3 in	215 lbs	Virginia	2025	St. Stephen's & St. Agnes	Alexandria, Virginia	
5	Jimmy Freehill	(United States)	Defense	Right	6 ft 0 in	190 lbs	Denver	2025	St. Sebastian's	Newton, Massachusetts	
6	Kieran McArdle (C)	(United States)	Attack	L/R	6 ft 2 in	185 lbs	St. John's	2014	Connetquot	Ronkonkoma, New York	
7	Kyle Lewis	(United States)	Midfield	Right	5 ft 11 in	200 lbs	Adelphi	2026	Carey	Franklin Square, New York	
8	Dylan Hess**	(United States)	SSDM	Right	6 ft 0 in	215 lbs	Florida	2025	Ponte Vedra	Ponte Vedra Beach, Florida	
10	Josh Yago	(United States)	Midfield	Right	6 ft 3 in	210 lbs	Notre Dame	2026	Arvada West	Denver, Colorado	
11	Marcus Hudgins	(United States)	Defense	Right	6 ft 1 in	215 lbs	Ohio State	2024	West Genesee	Syracuse, New York	
15	CJ Kirst	(United States)	Attack	Left	6 ft 2 in	210 lbs	Cornell	2025	Delbarton	Bernardsville, New Jersey	
16	Matt Collison	(Canada)	Midfield	Left	6 ft 4 in	225 lbs	Johns Hopkins	2026	St. Michael's	Scarborough, Ontario	
18	Silas Richmond	(Canada)	Attack	Right	6 ft 4 in	220 lbs	Albany	2026	Delta	Delta, British Columbia	
22	Michael Sowers	(United States)	Attack	R/L	5 ft 9 in	180 lbs	Duke	Princeton	2021	Upper Dublin	Dresher, Pennsylvania
23	Charlie Hayes	(United States)	SSDM	Right	5 ft 11 in	187 lbs	Detroit Mercy	2018	Eisenhower	Shelby Township, Michigan	
24	Nakeie Montgomery	(United States)	SSDM	Right	5 ft 11 in	200 lbs	Duke	2022	Episcopal School of Dallas	Dallas, Texas	
29	Kenny Brower	(United States)	Defense	Left	6 ft 2 in	215 lbs	Duke	2024	Massapequa	Massapequa, New York	
32	Brendan Staub	(United States)	LSM	Right	6 ft 1 in	205 lbs	Cornell	2026	Garden City	Garden City, New York	
33	Matt Whitcher	(United States)	SSDM	Right	6 ft 3 in	200 lbs	York	2018	Huntington	Huntington, New York	
40	Connor Kelly	(United States)	Midfield	R/L	6 ft 0 in	200 lbs	Maryland	2018	Avon Old Farms	Easton, Connecticut	
41	Connor Farrell	(United States)	Faceoff	Right	6 ft 2 in	240 lbs	LIU Post	2019	Sachem East	Holtsville, New York	
42	Tim Troutner	(United States)	Goalie	Left	6 ft 1 in	205 lbs	High Point	2019	St. Mary's	Annapolis, Maryland	
51	Dox Aitken	(United States)	Midfield	Right	6 ft 2 in	215 lbs	Virginia	2021	Haverford	Villanova, Pennsylvania	
73	Alec Stathakis	(United States)	Faceoff	Right	5 ft 11 in	220 lbs	Denver	2024	Culver Academy	Northville, Michigan	
77	Zach Currier	(Canada)	Midfield	Left	6 ft 0 in	180 lbs	Princeton	2017	Culver Academy	Peterborough, Ontario	
97	Gavin Adler	(United States)	Defense	Left	5 ft 8 in	190 lbs	Cornell	2023	Hewlett	Hewlett, New York	
99	Sean Byrne	(United States)	Goalie	Right	6 ft 3 in	200 lbs	Army	2026	Allatoona	Acworth, Georgia	

*Indicates member of Unavailable to Travel list

**Indicates player is on injured list

(C) indicates captain

== Draft history ==
=== 2020 Expansion Draft ===
Pick #	Player	Pos.	PLL Team	College
1	Connor Kelly	Midfield	Whipsnakes	Maryland
2	Christian Cuccinello	Attack	Archers	Villanova
3	Brodie Merrill	Defense	Chaos	Georgetown
4	Charlie Cipriano	Goalie	Chaos	Fairfield
5	Ben Reeves	Attack	Whipsnakes	Yale
6	Kyle McClancy	Midfield	Chaos	SUNY Albany
7	Kieran McArdle	Attack	Atlas	St. John's
8	Brian Karalunas	Defense	Redwoods	Villanova
9	Ben McIntosh	Midfield	Archers	Drexel
10	Drew Snider	Midfield	Whipsnakes	Maryland
11	Ryan Drenner	Attack	Whipsnakes	Towson
12	Noah Richard	Long Stick Midfield	Atlas	Marquette
13	Steven DeNapoli	Midfield	Atlas	Hofstra
14	Wes Berg	Midfield	Redwoods	Denver
15	Chris Sabia	Defense	Chrome	Penn State
16	Ryan Conrad	Midfield	Atlas	Virginia
17	Dan Eipp	Midfield	Archers	Harvard
18	Drew Simoneau	Faceoff	Chrome	Nazareth College

=== 2020 Player Pool Acquisitions ===
On March 21, Waterdogs announced they had signed the following players from the player pool:

Name	Position	College
BJ Grill	Defense	Marquette
Patrick Foley	Defense	Johns Hopkins
Dylan Johnson	Defense	Denver
Tate Boyce	Goalie	Providence
Reed Junkin	Goalie	Penn

== All time Draft Selections ==
2020 Entry Draft

The 2020 player entry draft occurred on March 16 for teams to select players arriving from rival Major League Lacrosse. On March 4, Paul Burmeister and NBCSN hosted an entry draft lottery for selection order. Out of 100 balls to select from, Waterdogs had 40, Chrome had 25, Atlas had 15, Archers had 10, Chaos had 6, Redwoods had 3, and the champion Whipsnakes had 1.

Rob Pannell was announced to be transferring to the PLL on March 9, followed by 15 other players the following day, which comprised the selection pool for the entry draft. A total of 14 players were selected in the entry draft with remaining new players entering the league player pool.

Draft results
Rnd.	Pick #	Player	Pos.	College	Previous MLL Team
1	1	Zach Currier	Midfield	Princeton	Denver Outlaws
2	8	Ryland Rees	Long Stick Midfield	Stony Brook	Boston Cannons

2020 College Draft

Rnd.	Pick #	Player	Pos.	College
1	3	Michael Kraus	Attack	Virginia
2	8	Matt DeLuca	Goalie	Delaware

2021 Entry Draft

Draft results
Rnd.	Pick #	Player	Pos.	College	Previous MLL Team
1	4	Liam Byrnes	Defense	Marquette	Philadelphia Barrage
2	12	Mikie Schlosser	Midfield	Michigan	New York Lizards
3	20	Ben Randall	Defense	Ohio State	Denver Outlaws

2021 College Draft

Rnd.	Pick #	Player	Pos.	College
1	2	Michael Sowers	Attack	Duke
4	27	Ethan Walker	Attack	Denver

2022 College Draft

Rnd.	Pick #	Player	Pos.	College
2	14	Jack Hannah	Midfield	Denver
3	22	Jake Higgins	Defensive Midfield	Maryland
4	30	Jason Reynolds	Long Stick Midfield	Notre Dame

2023 College Draft

Rnd.	Pick #	Player	Pos.	College
1	8	Thomas McConvey	Midfield	Virginia
2	16	Alex Mazzone	Defense	Johns Hopkins
3	24	Chris Fake	Defense	Notre Dame
4	32	James Reilly	Faceoff	Georgetown

2024 College Draft

Rnd.	Pick #	Player	Pos.	College
1	7	Matt Brandau	Attack	Yale
2	15	Kenny Brower	Defense	Duke
3	23	Marcus Hudgins	Defense	Ohio State
4	31	Michael Boehm	Attack	Michigan

2025 College Draft

Rnd.	Pick #	Player	Pos.	College
1	1	CJ Kirst	Attack	Cornell
2	9	Jake Taylor	Attack	Notre Dame
2	15	Dylan Hess	Defensive Midfield	Florida
3	23	Ben Wayer	Long Stick Midfield	Virginia
4	25	Jimmy Freehill	Defense	Denver

=== 2026 College Draft ===
Rnd.	Pick #	Player	Pos.	College
1	5	Silas Richmond	Attack	Albany
2	13	Matt Collison	Midfield	Johns Hopkins
3	21	Josh Yago	Attack	Notre Dame
3	23	Brendan Staub	LSM	Cornell
4	29	Kyle Lewis	Midfield	Adelphi

== Season results ==
2020
Game	Location	Date	Opponent	Result
1	Herriman, Utah	July 26, 2020	Atlas	L 10–11
2	Herriman, Utah	July 28, 2020	Archers	L 7–9
3	Herriman, Utah	July 31, 2020	Chrome	L 12–13
4	Herriman, Utah	August 1, 2020	Chaos	W 10–9
5 (Elimination)	Herriman, Utah	August 4, 2020	Redwoods	L 8–11

2021
Game	Location	Date	Opponent	Result
1	Foxborough, Massachusetts	June 6, 2021	Cannons	L 7–13
2	Kennesaw, Georgia	June 11, 2021	Chaos	W 14–12
3	Kennesaw, Georgia	June 13, 2021	Chrome	W 14–9
4	Baltimore, Maryland	June 26, 2021	Archers	L 8–17
5	Hempstead, New York	July 3, 2021	Redwoods	L 16–19
6	Eagan, Minnesota	July 9, 2021	Cannons	W 19–7
7	Eagan, Minnesota	July 11, 2021	Chrome	W 12–6
8	Colorado Springs, Colorado	July 31, 2021	Whipsnakes	W 11–6
9	Albany, New York	August 14, 2021	Atlas	W 10–9
10 (Semifinal)	Chester, Pennsylvania	September 5, 2021	Whipsnakes	L 10–14

2022
Game	Location	Date	Opponent	Result
1	Albany, New York	June 5, 2022	Cannons	L 10–16
2	Charlotte, North Carolina	June 11, 2022	Whipsnakes	L 11–12
3	Hempstead, New York	June 17, 2022	Chrome	L 14–17
4	Baltimore, Maryland	June 24, 2022	Chaos	W 18–9
5	Eagan, Minnesota	July 2, 2022	Whipsnakes	W 11–10
6	Fairfield, Connecticut	July 24, 2022	Chrome	W 11–10
7	Frisco, Texas	July 31, 2022	Cannons	W 15–14
8	Denver, Colorado	August 6, 2022	Atlas	W 16–15
9	Herriman, Utah	August 12, 2022	Redwoods	L 12–14
10	Tacoma, Washington	August 20, 2022	Archers	L 12–16
11 (Quarterfinal)	Foxborough, Massachusetts	September 3, 2022	Atlas	W 19–14
12 (Semifinal)	Washington D.C.	September 11, 2022	Whipsnakes	W 11–10
13 (Championship)	Chester, Pennsylvania	September 18, 2022	Chaos	W 11–9

2023
Game	Location	Date	Opponent	Result
1	Albany, New York	June 4	Chaos	W 8–7 (OT)
2	Charlotte, North Carolina	June 9	Redwoods	L 9–10
3	Columbus, Ohio	June 16	Atlas	W 19–18
4	Eagan, Minnesota	July 8	Chrome	W 10–7
5	Fairfield, Connecticut	July 14	Whipsnakes	W 16–13
6	Frisco, Texas	July 30	Archers	L 18–19
7	Baltimore, Maryland	August 6	Cannons	L 8–12
8	Denver, Colorado	August 12	Atlas	W 14–11
9	Tacoma, Washington	August 19	Chaos	W 13–8
10	Herriman, Utah	August 25	Archers	W 14–13
11 (Quarterfinal)	Foxborough, Massachusetts	September 4	Whipsnakes	W 15–12
12 (Semifinal)	Uniondale, New York	September 10	Cannons	W 17–6
13 (Championship)	Chester, Pennsylvania	September 24	Archers	L 14–15

2024 Championship Series
Game	Location	Date	Opponent	Result
1	Springfield, VA	February 15	Archers	W 21–18
2	Springfield, VA	February 16	Redwoods	W 20–14
3	Springfield, VA	February 17	Cannons	W 22–12
4 (Semifinals)	Springfield, VA	February 18	Archers	W 27–21
5 (Championship)	Springfield, VA	February 19	Cannons	L 22–23 (OT)

2024
Game	Location	Date	Opponent	Result
1	Albany, New York	June 1	Archers	L 11–12
2	Villanova, Pennsylvania	June 15	Cannons	L 11–12 (OT)
3	Villanova, Pennsylvania	June 16	Whipsnakes	L 14–15 (OT)
4	Eagan, Minnesota	June 29	Chaos	W 10–6
5	Cambridge, Massachusetts	July 6	Cannons	W 14–11
6	Fairfield, Connecticut	July 19	Outlaws	L 13–15
7	San Diego, California	July 28	Atlas	L 11–12
8	Baltimore, Maryland	August 3	Whipsnakes	L 6–12
9	Denver, Colorado	August 9	Redwoods	L 12–13
10	Herriman, Utah	August 17	Atlas	W 13–12

2025
Game	Location	Date	Opponent	Result
1	Charlotte, North Carolina	June 6	Whipsnakes	W 16–11
2	Villanova, Pennsylvania	June 13	Cannons	W 14–11
3	Villanova, Pennsylvania	June 14	Outlaws	L 7–9
4	Baltimore, Maryland	June 21	Chaos	L 9–17
5	San Diego, California	June 28	Redwoods	W 12–9
6	Evanston, Illinois	July 11	Archers	W 16–11
7	Fairfield, Connecticut	July 19	Whipsnakes	L 7–10
8	Herriman, Utah	July 26	Chaos	L 14–15 (OT)
9	Denver, Colorado	August 1	Cannons	L 10–13
10	Cambridge, Massachusetts	August 9	Atlas	L 19–20
11 (Quarterfinal)	Eagan, Minnesota	August 23	Whipsnakes	W 14–12
12 (Semifinal)	Chester, Pennsylvania	September 1	Atlas	L 11–13

== PLL Award Winners ==
Jim Brown Most Valuable Player

- CJ Kirst: 2026

Eamon McEneaney Attackman of the Year

- Michael Sowers: 2026

Gait Brothers Midfielder of the Year

- Zach Currier: 2021, 2026

Dick Edell Coach of the Year

- Andy Copelan: 2021
- Bill Tierney: 2026

== Head coaches ==
#	Name	Term	Regular season				Playoffs				Notes
#	Name	Term	GP	W	L	Pct	GP	W	L	Pct	Notes
1	Andy Copelan	2020-2023	33	19	14	.576	7	5	2	.714	Participated in the 2024 Championship Series, resigned prior to the 2024 regular season
2	Bill Tierney	2024 - Current	20	7	13	.350	2	1	1	.500	Hired on March 28, 2024

== All-time record vs. PLL Clubs ==
Opponent	Won	Lost	Percentage	Streak
Archers	1	7	.125	Won 1
Atlas	6	4	.600	Lost 2
Cannons	5	5	.500	Lost 1
Chaos	7	2	.778	Lost 2
Outlaws	4	4	.500	Lost 2
Redwoods	1	5	.167	Won 1
Whipsnakes	7	5	.583	Won 1
Totals	31	32	.492	
