= Anthony Kelly (lacrosse) =

American lacrosse player (born 1980)

Personal information
- Nicknames: A-Train, Train, AK
- Born: May 30, 1980 (age 46) North Olmsted, Ohio, U.S.
- Height: 6 ft 4 in (193 cm)
- Weight: 255 lb (116 kg; 18 st 3 lb)

Sport
- Position: Midfielder/Face-Off
- Coached by: Hilliard Davidson High School (2003-2007); Denison University (2004); Harvard University (2008); Ohio State University (2009); California Redwoods (2025-present)
- NLL teams: Rochester Knighthawks; New York Titans
- MLL teams: Los Angeles Riptide; Chicago Machine; Rochester Rattlers; Ohio Machine; Denver Outlaws; Chesapeake Bayhawks
- NCAA team: Ohio State University
- Pro career: 2005–2018

Career highlights
- 6x MLL All Star (2008-2010, 2013-2015); Academic All Big Ten Team (2003); 2nd in career face off wins (1,820); 8th in career ground balls (535)

Anthony Kelly (born May 30, 1980) is a retired professional lacrosse player that played on the Chesapeake Bayhawks in the MLL (Major League Lacrosse). He has also played for the Rochester Knighthawks and New York Titans in the NLL, the Kentucky Stickhorses in the NALL, and the Los Angeles Riptide, Chicago Machine, Rochester Rattlers, Ohio Machine, and Denver Outlaws of the MLL. He is a faceoff specialist and retired in April 2018. He is currently the head coach of the California Redwoods of the Premier Lacrosse League.

As a member of the United States national indoor lacrosse team, Kelly won a bronze medal at the 2007 World Indoor Lacrosse Championship. He came out of retirement to return at the 2019 edition, winning another bronze medal.

== Biography ==
=== Early life ===
Anthony Kelly was born in North Olmsted, Ohio, on May 30, 1980, to Mike and Linda Kelly. Kelly played for St. Ignatius High School in Cleveland, Ohio, under Ed Aghajanian.

=== College career ===
Kelly played four years of college lacrosse at Ohio State University for coach Joe Breschi, starting every game. He had a fantastic college career. Some of his key college accomplishments include:

- Only player in school history to lead the team in ground balls all 4 years of career
- Ranked nationally in face-off win percentage all 4 years of college career
- Helped the Buckeyes win the GWLL Conference Championship in 2003
- Buckeye Power Club Award Winner

=== Professional career ===
Kelly's professional career started in 2005 with the Minnesota Swarm of the National Lacrosse League (NLL). He was also drafted in the Major League Lacrosse (MLL) supplemental draft that same year by the Los Angeles Riptide. Kelly was named L.A.’s “Newcomer of the Year” by US Lacrosse Magazine and lead L.A. to a #2 Ranking in face-off wins for the 2006 season. Anthony remained with the Riptide in 2007 and enjoyed a great year with 169 face offs won, a career high 62 ground balls, and 6 points. In 2008 Kelly won 184 faceoffs for the Riptide and was selected to participate in his first MLL All Star Game and skills competition. He won the fastest shot competition with a shot clocked at 109 mph (175.4 km/h).

When the LA Riptide dissolved in 2009, Kelly was picked up by the Chicago Machine where he played two seasons. He was transferred to the Rochester Rattlers for the 2011 season and then was picked up by the new expansion team the Ohio Machine in 2012. After 8 games with the Ohio Machine Kelly was traded to the Denver Outlaws for the rest of the 2012 MLL season. As a key face off man for Denver, Kelly won 87–149 face offs in 5 games, with a face off win percentage of 58.4%. He helped the Outlaws advance to the MLL Championship to play for the Steinfeld Cup, where they were eventually defeated by the Chesapeake Bayhawks. Kelly returned with the Outlaws in 2013 and helped them to the first perfect regular season in MLL history. The Outlaws went 14–0 as Anthony won 195 face offs, picked up 59 ground balls, and scored 5 goals. Kelly played 12 games with the Outlaws in 2014 and collected a career high 63 ground ball pickups, despite missing the last two games of the regular season due to injury. He won a total of 159-303 faceoffs in the 2014 regular season and went 14–25 in the final playoff game to help the Outlaws win the 2014 MLL Championship. 2015 was another great year for Kelly as he won 169-298 (56.7%) face offs for the Denver.

In 2016, his 9th season in the MLL, Kelly was traded to the Chesapeake Bayhawks to fill the role of face off specialist.

== Statistics ==
=== MLL ===
==== Regular season ====
| Year | Team | GP | G | 2ptG | A | PTS | PIM | PPG | PPA | SHG | SHA | GWG | GB | S | SPCT | SOG | FO |
|---|---|---|---|---|---|---|---|---|---|---|---|---|---|---|---|---|---|
| 2015 | Denver | 10 | 1 | 0 | 0 | 1 | .5 | 0 | 0 | 0 | 0 | 0 | 47 | 4 | .250 | 1 | 169-298 |
| 2014 | Denver | 12 | 0 | 0 | 2 | 2 | 0 | 0 | 0 | 0 | 0 | 0 | 63 | 13 | .000 | 5 | 159-303 |
| 2013 | Denver | 14 | 5 | 0 | 0 | 5 | 1 | 0 | 0 | 0 | 0 | 0 | 59 | 16 | .313 | 11 | 195–354 |
| 2012 | Ohio/Denver | 12 | 1 | 0 | 3 | 4 | 0 | 0 | 0 | 0 | 0 | 0 | 59 | 10 | .100 | 5 | 164–306 |
| 2011 | Rochester | 11 | 3 | 1 | 1 | 5 | 0 | 0 | 0 | 0 | 0 | 0 | 41 | 12 | .250 | 7 | 128–285 |
| 2010 | Chicago | 11 | 0 | 0 | 2 | 2 | 0 | 0 | 0 | 0 | 0 | 0 | 57 | 13 | .000 | 4 | 160–317 |
| 2009 | Chicago | 8 | 2 | 0 | 0 | 2 | 3.5 | 0 | 0 | 0 | 0 | 0 | 12 | 6 | .333 | 4 | 108–217 |
| 2008 | LA | 12 | 6 | 1 | 1 | 8 | 2.5 | 0 | 0 | 0 | 0 | 0 | 45 | 18 | .333 | 12 | 184–375 |
| 2007 | LA | 11 | 1 | 0 | 5 | 6 | 2 | 0 | 0 | 0 | 0 | 0 | 62 | 17 | .059 | 5 | 169–337 |
| 2006 | LA | 11 | 6 | 0 | 0 | 6 | 1 | 0 | 0 | 0 | 0 | 0 | 36 | 23 | .261 | 14 | 132–252 |
| TOTALS | | 112 | 25 | 2 | 14 | 41 | 12 | 1 | 0 | 0 | 0 | 0 | 481 | 132 | .000 | 68 | 1568-3044 |

==== Playoffs ====
| Year | Team | GP | G | 2ptG | A | PTS | PIM | PPG | PPA | SHG | SHA | GWG | GB | S | SPCT | SOG | FO |
|---|---|---|---|---|---|---|---|---|---|---|---|---|---|---|---|---|---|
| 2014 | Denver | 2 | 0 | 0 | 0 | 0 | 0 | 0 | 0 | 0 | 0 | 0 | 2 | 1 | .000 | 0 | 22-42 |
| 2013 | Denver | 1 | 0 | 0 | 0 | 0 | 0 | 0 | 0 | 0 | 0 | 0 | 1 | 1 | .000 | 1 | 4-16 |
| 2012 | Denver | 2 | 0 | 0 | 1 | 1 | 0 | 0 | 0 | 0 | 0 | 0 | 2 | 0 | .000 | 0 | 12–33 |
| TOTALS | | 5 | 0 | 0 | 1 | 1 | 0 | 0 | 0 | 0 | 0 | 0 | 5 | 2 | .000 | 1 | 38-91 |

==== Tournament ====
| Year | Team | GP | G | 2ptG | A | PTS | PIM | PPG | PPA | SHG | SHA | GWG | GB | S | SPCT | SOG | FO |
|---|---|---|---|---|---|---|---|---|---|---|---|---|---|---|---|---|---|
| 2008 | LA | 1 | 1 | 0 | 0 | 1 | 0 | 0 | 0 | 0 | 0 | 0 | 4 | 1 | 1.000 | 1 | 15–27 |
| 2008 | Western Conference | 1 | 3 | 1 | 1 | 5 | 1 | 1 | 0 | 1 | 0 | 0 | 13 | 5 | .600 | 3 | 24–45 |
| 2007 | LA | 2 | 1 | 0 | 0 | 1 | 0 | 0 | 0 | 0 | 0 | 0 | 6 | 2 | .500 | 1 | 23–45 |
| TOTALS | | 4 | 5 | 1 | 1 | 7 | 1 | 1 | 0 | 1 | 0 | 0 | 23 | 8 | .000 | 5 | 62–117 |

=== NLL ===
| | | Regular season | | | | | | Playoffs |
| Season | Team | GP | G | A | Pts | LB | PIM | GP | G | A | Pts | LB | PIM |
|---|---|---|---|---|---|---|---|---|---|---|---|---|---|
| 2007 | New York | 5 | 0 | 1 | 1 | 17 | 26 | – | – | – | – | – | – |
| 2008 | New York | 2 | 0 | 0 | 0 | 5 | 0 | – | – | – | – | – | – |
| 2009 | Rochester | 2 | 0 | 1 | 1 | 9 | 0 | 0 | 0 | 0 | 0 | 0 | 0 |
| NLL totals | | 9 | 0 | 2 | 2 | 31 | 26 | 0 | 0 | 0 | 0 | 0 | 0 |

== Coaching career ==
Kelly graduated in 2003 from Ohio State University and went on to become the head coach at Hilliard Davidson High School in Hilliard, Ohio – a suburb of Columbus, until the 2007 season. Anthony also coached lacrosse collegiately for Denison University (2004), Harvard University (2008) and The Ohio State University (2009). Kelly was named the head coach of the PLL's California Redwoods prior to the 2025 PLL season.

== Awards and honors ==
- 2002 preseason All-America selection
- 2003 GWLL Championship
- 2003 Academic All Big Ten award recipient
- 2003 Ohio State University's Team Sportsmanship Award
- 2006 Named L.A.'s Newcomer of the Year by US Lacrosse Magazine
- 2007 Won bronze medal with Team USA at the 2007 World Games in Halifax, Nova Scotia
- 2008 MLL All-Star
- 2008 Won fastest shot competition at MLL All-Star game with a 109 MPH shot
- 2009 MLL All-Star
- 2010 MLL All-Star
- 2013 MLL All-Star
- 2014 MLL All-Star
- 2014 Won MLL Championship with Denver Outlaws
- 2015 MLL All-Star
- 2015 Inducted into US Lacrosse North Coast Chapter Hall of Fame
- Denver Outlaws career record holder face off win percentage (56.1% 282–503)
- MLL career record holder face off attempts (2,746)
- 2nd all time in MLL/PLL history in face off wins (1,820)
- 8th all time in MLL/PLL history in ground balls (535)

== Personal info ==
Anthony is the Midwest Sales Manager for STX. He co-founded Resolute Lacrosse in 2009 with his former Ohio State lacrosse teammate and friend, Greg Bice. They are also Co-owners/Operators of The Resolute Athletic Complex, a 74,000 square foot indoor complex with 3 turf fields, a weight room, and training space. He enjoys coaching for Resolute, hunting with his Dad and brother at their family cabin, and playing ice hockey as much as possible in his free time. Anthony has an Education Degree from the Ohio State University where he graduated in 2003.
