= Torero Stadium =

Stadium in San Diego, CA, US

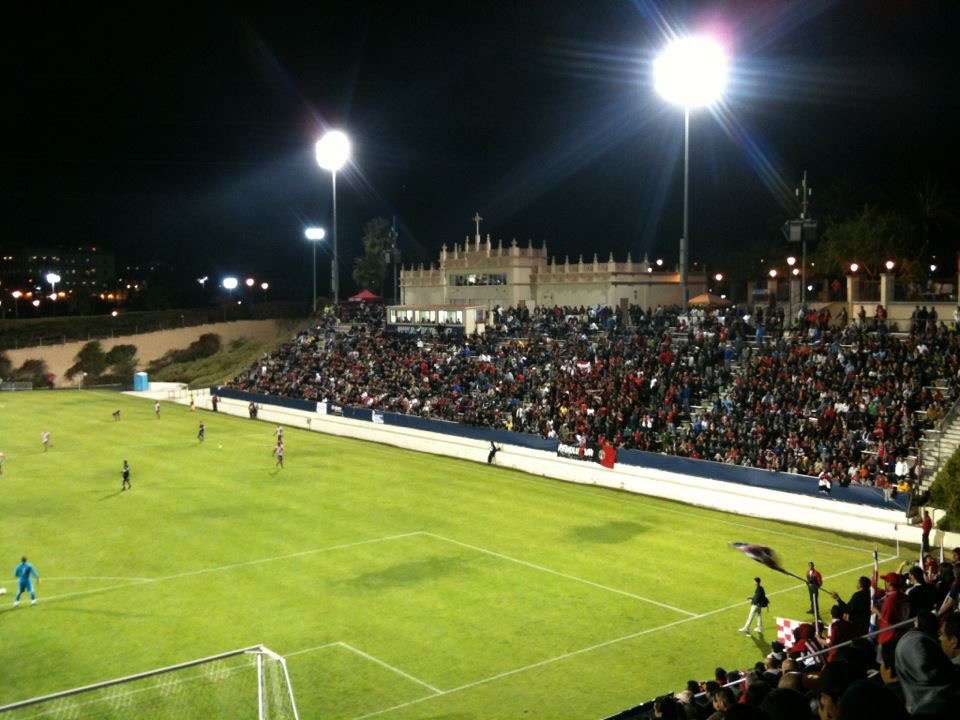
- Interactive map of Torero Stadium
- Address: 5998 Alcala Park Way
- Location: San Diego, California
- Coordinates: 32.7731°N 117.1837°W
- Owner: University of San Diego
- Operator: University of San Diego
- Capacity: 6,000
- Surface: Grass
- Field size: 72 by 118 yards (66 by 108 m)

Construction
- Groundbreaking: 1961
- Opened: 1961; 65 years ago

Tenants
- American football: San Diego Toreros (NCAA) (1961–present); Rugby union: San Diego Breakers (PRO) (2016); San Diego Legion (MLR) (2018–2021, 2024–2025); Soccer: San Diego Toreros (NCAA) (1961–present); San Diego Spirit (WUSA) (2001–2003); San Diego United (NPSL) (2009); San Diego Loyal SC (USLC) (2020–2023); San Diego Wave FC (NWSL) (2022); Lacrosse: California Redwoods (PLL) (2024–present)

Website
- usdtoreros.com/stadium

Torero Stadium is an outdoor stadium in San Diego, California, located on the campus of the University of San Diego (USD). Opened in 1961, it is the home of the San Diego Toreros football and men's and women's soccer teams. The Toreros compete in NCAA Division I (FCS) as a member of the Pioneer Football League (PFL) for football and the West Coast Conference (WCC) for soccer. The stadium is also the home of the California Redwoods of the Premier Lacrosse League (PLL).

== History ==
Torero Stadium is the former home of San Diego Loyal SC of the USL Championship. It also served as the home of San Diego Wave FC of the National Women's Soccer League for most of its inaugural 2022 season before the team moved to San Diego State University's Snapdragon Stadium, which opened in September 2022. Additionally, it was the home of the San Diego Breakers rugby team.

The stadium has hosted Major League Soccer and Liga MX exhibition games for the LA Galaxy, Club Tijuana, Toronto FC and Chivas USA. The U.S. women's national soccer team has played friendlies at the stadium. The WUSA San Diego Spirit women's soccer team played at Torero from 2001 to 2003. Torero Stadium hosted the 2012 women's college cup soccer tournament.

Since 2002, the stadium has hosted The First 4 men's college lacrosse invitational. The New England Patriots used the stadium as their practice facility for the week leading up to their game with the San Diego Chargers on December 7, 2014.

In 2024, the California Redwoods of the Premier Lacrosse League (PLL) announced San Diego as their home market, with plans to use Torero Stadium as their venue for home games.

== Facilities and renovations ==
The south stands feature approximately 1,100 bleacher seats with backs and with press box facilities. The east and north stands are all bleacher seating – the north stands hold about 3,000 fans and the stands behind the east end hold approximately 1,900. The playing surface is "Bandera" Bermuda grass, with soccer dimensions measuring 118 by 72 yards (108 m × 66 m), with football conforming to NCAA regulations.

The stadium underwent two phases of renovation to host the former WUSA San Diego Spirit. Over $3.5 million was spent to enlarge the seating areas and add spectator comforts. In 2001, the installation of the upgraded lighting system took place. The final steps included the paving of the pedestrian walkway that curves around three-quarters of the stadium and the installation of a new sound system and a video board and scoreboard.

== See also ==
- List of NCAA Division I FCS football stadiums

Preceded by KSU Soccer Stadium	Host of the Women's College Cup; 2012	Succeeded by WakeMed Soccer Park
