= T. D. Ierlan =

American lacrosse player (born 1998)

TD Ierlan
Personal information
- Nationality: American
- Born: April 12, 1998 (age 28) Victor, New York, U.S.
- Height: 5 ft 9 in (175 cm)
- Weight: 175 lb (79 kg; 12 st 7 lb)

Sport
- Position: Faceoff specialist (Field), Defense (Box)
- Shoots: Right
- NCAA team: Albany; Yale; Denver (2021)
- NLL draft: 30th overall, 2020; Toronto Rock
- NLL team: Toronto Rock
- MLL draft: 1st overall, 2020; New York Lizards
- PLL team: Redwoods
- Pro career: 2021–

Career highlights
- NCAA: 5x All-American (2x First Team); Career record for faceoff wins (1,245) and ground balls (867); Single season record for faceoff wins (393) and ground balls (293); Single game record for faceoff wins in an NCAA Tournament game (31), and ground balls in a game (29); Ivy League Player of the Year (2019); America East Defensive Player of the Year (2018); PLL: Paul Cantabene Faceoff Athlete of the Year (2025); First Team All-Pro (2025); 2x Second Team All-Pro (2021, 2026); 5x All-Star (2021, 2023-26)
Medal record
Representing United States
Men's lacrosse
World Lacrosse Championship
Winner	2023 San Diego

Tristan David "TD" Ierlan is an American professional lacrosse player who plays as a faceoff specialist for the California Redwoods of the Premier Lacrosse League and the Toronto Rock of the National Lacrosse League. Regarded as one of the best faceoff specialists of all time, Ierlan holds numerous NCAA records, having played at Albany, Yale, and Denver before turning professional. Additionally, he is a volunteer assistant lacrosse coach at Syracuse.

== Early life and career ==
Ierlan is the son of Mike and Karen Ierlan. He has a brother, Chayse, who is his teammate with the Redwoods, and a sister, Doyle. He attended Victor Senior High School in Victor, New York, where he earned four varsity letters in football, wrestling, and lacrosse. On the wrestling mat, Ierlan set a school record with 161 wins. In lacrosse, he won 1,135 faceoffs at an 83% win rate, as well as collecting 661 ground balls and recording 50 points over his career. He helped lead Victor to state championships in lacrosse during his final two years, being named an All-American and New York Player of the Year both times.

== College career ==
=== Albany ===
In his freshman year at Albany, he played for Albany Great Danes and won 70.8% of his faceoffs, with 323 total wins, which was second in NCAA history, and 202 ground balls, which was fourth in NCAA history, while also adding 10 points. He was named America East Rookie of the Year, as well as being named a first team All-America East, All-America East Rookie, and All-Tournament teams, and a second team All-American by Inside Lacrosse and third team USILA All-American. The following season, Ierlan set single-season records in faceoff percentage (79.1%), faceoff wins (359), and ground balls (254). He was named the America East Defensive Player of the Year, as well as all-Conference first team, all-Academic team, and second team an All-American by Inside Lacrosse and the USILA, as well as being a nominee for the Tewaaraton Award as Albany reached the Final Four for the first time in program history.

=== Yale ===
Ierlan transferred to Yale following his sophomore year, as he felt he didn't fit with the Albany program. During his first season with Yale Bulldogs, Ierlan broke his own records for faceoff wins and ground balls with 393 and 293 respectively. He set the record for the best faceoff percentage in NCAA history by going 26–26 against Harvard, as well as NCAA records for faceoff wins in an NCAA tournament game (31) and ground balls in a game (29) against Georgetown. Ierlan was named a First Team All-American and was a finalist for the Tewaaraton Award, as well as Ivy League Player of the Year. During his senior season in 2020, Ierlan set the career record for faceoff wins in a game against Michigan.

=== Denver ===
As Yale did not play in 2021 due to the COVID-19 pandemic, Ierlan transferred to Denver for his final college season. He played in nine games for the Pioneers, being named an honorable mention All-American.

=== Statistics ===
Season	Team	GP	G	A	Pts	FOW	FOA	FO%	GB
2017	Albany	18	4	6	10	323	456	70.8%	202
2018	Albany	19	6	5	11	359	454	79.1%	254
2019	Yale	19	6	6	12	393	519	75.7%	293
2020	Yale	4	0	0	0	84	110	76.4%	61
2021	Denver	9	0	1	1	86	118	72.9%	57
Total		69	16	18	34	1,245	1,657	75.1%	867

== Professional career ==
=== PLL ===
Ierlan was selected first overall in the 2020 Major League Lacrosse draft by the New York Lizards, though he decided to return to college instead. The following year, he was taken fourth overall by Redwoods Lacrosse Club in the Premier Lacrosse League college draft. Ierlan was an All-Star as a rookie.

==== Statistics ====
Season	Team	Regular season											Playoffs										
Season	Team	GP	G	2PG	A	Pts	Sh	GB	Pen	PIM	FOW	FOA	GP	G	2PG	A	Pts	Sh	GB	Pen	PIM	FOW	FOA
2021	Redwoods LC	8	0	0	0	0	7	79	0	0	132	203	–	–	–	–	–	–	–	–	–	–	–
2022	Redwoods LC	10	1	0	1	2	5	78	2	1.5	135	252	1	0	0	0	0	2	7	0	0	15	24
2023	Redwoods LC	10	1	0	1	2	9	118	2	1.5	162	239	2	1	0	0	1	3	11	0	0	21	35
2024	California Redwoods	10	4	0	0	4	13	81	0	0	143	238	–	–	–	–	–	–	–	–	–	–	–
2025	California Redwoods	10	3	0	3	6	12	74	0	0	150	248	2	1	0	0	1	1	9	1	0.5	23	46
2026	California Redwoods	12	2	0	1	3	13	111	2	1	189	321	1	0	0	0	0	1	8	0	0	17	32
		60	11	0	6	17	59	541	6	4	911	1,501	6	2	0	0	2	6	35	1	0.5	76	137
Career total:		66	13	0	6	19	65	576	7	4.5	987	1,638											

GP–Games played; G–Goals; 2PG–2-point goals; A–Assists; Pts–Points; Sh–Shots; GB–Ground balls; Pen–Penalties; PIM–Penalty minutes; FOW–Faceoffs won; FOA–Faceoffs attempted

=== NLL ===
Ierlan was selected 30th overall in the 2020 NLL Draft by the Toronto Rock despite having no experience in the box game. He made his debut in the 2022 season, playing as a defenseman and faceoff specialist.

==== Statistics ====
Season	Team	GP	G	A	Pts	FOW	FOA	LB	PIM
2022	Toronto Rock	16	1	2	3	234	392	111	0
Total		16	1	2	3	234	392	111	0

==== Playoffs ====
Season	Team	GP	G	A	Pts	FOW	FOA	LB	PIM
2022	Toronto Rock	3	0	0	0	54	92	20	0
