= 2021 Premier Lacrosse League season =

Third season of the Premier Lacrosse League

- League: Premier Lacrosse League
- Sport: Field lacrosse
- Duration: June 4 – September 19
- Teams: 8

Draft
- Top draft pick: Jeff Teat
- Picked by: New York Atlas

Regular season
- Season MVP: Blaze Riorden (Carolina Chaos)
- Top scorer: Grant Ament (Utah Archers)

Playoffs
- Finals champions: Carolina Chaos
- Runners-up: Maryland Whipsnakes
- Finals MVP: Blaze Riorden (Chaos)

PLL seasons
- ← 2020 2022 →

The 2021 Premier Lacrosse League season was the third season of the Premier Lacrosse League (PLL). The 2021 season represented a return to the tour-based format that the league followed in 2019 after playing a bubble tournament in 2020 due to the COVID-19 pandemic. 2021 also represented a return to one unified professional Field Lacrosse format after Major League Lacrosse and the Premier Lacrosse League announced they were merging on December 16, 2020. This monumental merger saw the PLL adopt the naming rights to all former MLL teams, as well as Cannons Lacrosse Club moving from the MLL to the PLL as an 8th team set by expansion draft. The Whipsnakes Lacrosse Club were the two-time defending league champions. Chaos Lacrosse Club took revenge against Whipsnakes Lacrosse Club by defeating them in the championship game on September 19 at Audi Field by a score of 9–14.

== Expansion ==
The addition of an eighth team, the Cannons Lacrosse Club, allows for schedule flexibility and natural bye weeks to occur for each team throughout the season. While the MLL fielded six teams last season and the PLL fielded seven, the post-merger PLL chose to expand by only one team to maintain the highest level of competition. The Cannons will form their initial PLL roster core through an expansion draft of unprotected players from the other seven clubs. Former MLL players will have a chance to join a roster through a new player draft, occurring on March 25.

== Player movement ==
The 2021 PLL waiver wire and trading period began on February 9. On February 28, expansion draft protected rosters are due and the waiver wire closes. On March 11, the Cannons Lacrosse Club will conduct their expansion draft and on March 25, the entire league will participate in an entry draft for former MLL players. The waiver wire will then reopen for the Cannons on March 26 and for the rest of the teams on March 30. The 2021 collegiate draft will be held on April 6. The conclusion of player movement through trade windows and the waiver wire is set for April 30.

Positions key
A	Attack	D	Defense	FOS	Faceoff Specialist
G	Goaltender	LSM	Long Stick Midfield	M	Midfield
SSDM	Short Stick Defensive Midfield				

=== Waiver wire ===
The first league waiver wire period began on February 9. Notable players to change teams at this time included:

=== Trades ===
The following notable trades were made during the 2021 league year:

- February 11: Atlas traded A Rob Pannell to the Redwoods for the third overall pick in the 2021 Entry Draft and a second-round pick in the 2022 College Draft.
- February 25: Chaos traded A Connor Fields to the Archers for M Ian MacKay.
- February 28: Atlas send M Paul Rabil and the sixth overall pick in the 2021 Entry Draft to the Cannons for the ninth overall pick in the 2021 Entry Draft, eighth overall pick in the 2021 College Draft, and a 2022 College Draft first round selection.
- March 2: Atlas send A Ryan Brown to the Waterdogs for the eleventh overall pick in the 2021 College Draft.

=== Notable retirements ===
The following notable players retired prior to the 2021 season:

- Kevin Buchanan (A) – Began his professional field career with the Los Angeles Riptide in 2008. Also spent time with the Bayhawks, Chicago Machine, and Boston Cannons. Buchanan spent the last two seasons with the Chaos Lacrosse Club. He retires with 282 career points outdoors. At the time of his retirement, Buchanan also had 421 points in the NLL.
- Matt Danowski (A) – Seven-time All-Star, Three-time All-Pro, and Co-Captain of the 2018 World Champion Team USA. Played for the Pride, Lizards, Hounds, Bayhawks, and Chrome during his 13-year career.
- Jeremy Sieverts (M) – Seven-time All-Star and five-time champion in both the MLL and PLL after going undrafted. Played eleven season with the Bayhawks, Outlaws, and Whipsnakes.
- Ty Warner (SSDM) – Drafted by the Florida Launch in 2018. Two-time PLL champion with the Whipsnakes and George Boiardi Hard Hat SSDM of the year (2020 PLL Championship Series). Warner announced he was stepping away from lacrosse to focus on medical school and his rights will be retained by the Whipsnakes through the 2022 season should he choose to return.

Other retirements

- Andrew Hodgson (M) – While playing at Towson, he was named to the 2011 CAA All-Rookie Team and was a two-time CAA Champion. Played in 2 games for Atlas where he tallied 2 goals ground balls. He is currently the owner of the Texas Oliers LAX.
- Brian Karalunas (LSM) – Played at Villanova where he was a three-time NCAA All-American, a two-time Big East Defensive Player of the Year and 2011 Senior Class award winner. Seven-time pro lacrosse All-Star. Played for the Redwoods and Waterdogs.
- Joe Locascio (M) – While at Maryland, he was a third-team All-American and a First Team All-Big Ten player. Two-time PLL champion with the Whipsnakes. His club team is the Long Island Express.
- Brent Noseworthy (M) – Played at Michigan where he made program history with 100 career goals and the all-time leader in goals scored with 102. Was selected 23rd overall in the PLL Entry Draft and played one game for Atlas. Club team is Edge Lacrosse.
- Nick Ossello (DM) – While at Notre Dame, he was an Honorable Mention All-American midfielder. Started 3 games for the Redwoods in 2019 and made it to the PLL Championship in 2020. Club team is Denver Elite/Colorado Wild.
- Tyler Pfister (M) – Played at Ohio State where he was an Academic All-American. Played in every game for the Archers in 2020.
- Brett Schmidt (D) – A two-time All-ACC selection and two-time USILA All-American at Maryland. Played for the Whipsnakes and is a two-time PLL Champion.

=== Retirements after season ===
- John Galloway (G) – While in goal at Syracuse, he a two-time Division I Goalie of the year and a two-time national champion. Played for Team USA in the 2018 World Championships, winning a gold medal. In his last professional Lacrosse game with the Chrome on August 15, 2021, he had 12 GA, 14 saves, with a .538% save percentage.
- Joel White (LSM) – A two-time National Champion and three-time All-American at Syracuse. A gold medalist for Team USA at the 2018 World Championships. His last professional lacrosse game with the Chrome was on August 15, 2021. He ended his 113-game career with 31 goals, 39 assists, 612 ground balls (4th in pro lacrosse history).
- Kyle Harrison (M) – While at Johns Hopkins, he was a two-time National Champion, a Tewaaraton Award winner, NCAA Player of the Year, two-time Midfielder of the Year, and three-time All-American. He was also a two-time US National Team Player, seven-time All-Star and Professional Lacrosse Champion, He ended his career with the Redwoods on August 22, 2021, with 149 career goals, 82 assists, and 241 points.
- Paul Rabil (M) – He is the face of professional lacrosse for over a decade. He was a four-time All-American at Johns Hopkins and a two-time NCAA Division I Champion. During a decorated 14-year pro career, Rabil was a two-time World Champion (gold medalist), a three-time Pro Lacrosse Champion, a three-time Pro Lacrosse MVP, and a PLL All-Star with Atlas. He ended his playing career with the Cannons and is the all-time leading scorer in pro field lacrosse. Rabil, the co-founder of the PLL, would continue to run the league's day-to-day operations.

=== Expansion Draft ===
The Cannons Expansion Draft took place on Thursday, March 11 to select an initial roster from players left unprotected by their team on March 1.

Expansion Draft Format:

- 18 Round Draft
- Max 3 players selected per existing PLL team
- Existing teams will protect 14 players (1-2 goalies + 12-13 field players)
- Teams must protect players selected in the 2020 College Draft

=== Player Entry Draft ===
All former MLL players, totaling more than 100 athletes, are currently without teams. Some of these players, along with NLL and other non-collegiate athletes without professional field experience, will be selected to team rosters in a specially formulated three-round draft on March 25. The expansion Cannons will be selecting first in each round and the selection slot of other teams was determined by lottery draw on February 10.

Draft results
Rnd.	Pick #	PLL Team	Player	Pos.	College
1	1	Cannons	Lyle Thompson	Attack	Albany
1	2	Archers	Graeme Hossack	Defense	Lindenwood
1	3	Atlas	Daniel Bucaro	Attack	Georgetown
1	4	Waterdogs	Liam Byrnes	Defense	Marquette
1	5	Chrome	Randy Staats	Attack	Syracuse
1	6	Cannons	Zach Goodrich	Short Stick Defense	Towson
1	7	Whipsnakes	Chris Aslanian	Attack/Midfield	Hobart
1	8	Chaos	Max Adler	Face-off	Bentley
2	1	Atlas	Michael Rexrode	Defense	Rutgers
2	2	Archers	Ryan McNamara	Midfield	Marquette
2	3	Redwoods	Ryan Lee	Attack	RIT
2	4	Waterdogs	Mikie Schlosser	Midfield	Michigan
2	5	Chrome	Sean Sconone	Goalie	UMass
2	6	Atlas	Andrew Newbold	Defense	Sacred Heart
2	7	Whipsnakes	Charlie Hayes	SSDM	Detroit Mercy
2	8	Chaos	Challen Rogers	Midfield	Stony Brook
3	1	Cannons	Nick Marrocco	Goalie	Georgetown
3	2	Archers	Warren Jeffrey	Defense	Vermont
3	3	Redwoods	Isaiah Davis-Allen	SSDM	Maryland
3	4	Waterdogs	Ben Randall	Defense	Ohio State
3	5	Chrome	Colin Heacock	Midfield	Maryland
3	6	Atlas	Brendan Sunday	Attack	Towson
3	7	Whipsnakes	Bryan Cole	Midfield	Maryland
3	8	Chaos	Kyle Jackson	Midfield	Michigan

=== College Draft ===
Due to NCAA eligibility rules in response to the COVID-19 pandemic, many college seniors returned for a fifth year of eligibility in the spring 2021 season. As a result, this year's draft on April 26 was expected to be among the most talent saturated in years. It once again aired on NBCSN beginning at 10:30 EDT and hosted by Paul Burmeister, along with analyst Ryan Boyle on the broadcast. PLL coaches called in via video call for breakdowns of their draft picks.

Format:

- Each club was awarded four picks, with the exception of Atlas LC and Chaos LC, which own six picks each.
- Eligible players must currently be in their senior season.

Rnd.	Pick #	PLL Team	Player	Pos.	College	Conf.
1	1	Atlas	Jeff Teat	Attack	Cornell	Ivy League
1	2	Waterdogs	Michael Sowers	Attack	Duke	Atlantic Coast Conference
1	3	Chrome	JT Giles-Harris	Defense	Duke	Atlantic Coast Conference
1	4	Redwoods	TD Ierlan	Face-off	Denver	Big East Conference
1	5	Archers	Jared Conners	LSM	Virginia	Atlantic Coast Conference
1	6	Chaos	Mac O'Keeffe	Attack	Penn State	Big Ten Conference
1	7	Whipsnakes	Connor Krist	Midfield	Rutgers	Big Ten Conference
1	8	Atlas	Dox Aitken	Midfield	Virginia	Atlantic Coast Conference
2	1	Cannons	Jack Kielty	Defense	Notre Dame	Atlantic Coast Conference
2	2	Atlas	Jake Caraway	Attack	Georgetown	Big East Conference
2	3	Atlas	Danny Logan	SSDM	Denver	Big East Conference
2	4	Chrone	Ryan Terefenko	SSDM	Ohio State	Big Ten Conference
2	5	Archers	Tre Leclaire	Midfield	Ohio State	Big Ten Conference
2	6	Chaos	Kyle Gallagher	Face-off	Notre Dame	Atlantic Coast Conference
2	7	Chaos	Tanner Cook	Midfield	North Carolina	Atlantic Coast Conference
2	8	Whipsnakes	Ryan Tierney	Attack	Hofstra	Colonial Athletic Conference
3	1	Atlas	Peter Dearth	SSDM	Syracuse	Atlantic Coast Conference
3	2	Archers	Jeff Trainor	Midfield	UMass	Colonial Athletic Conference
3	3	Chaos	Jared Bernhardt	Attack	Maryland	Big Ten Conference
3	4	Chrome	Justin Anderson	Attack	North Carolina	Atlantic Coast Conference
3	5	Archers	Conor Gaffney	Face-off	Lehigh	Patriot League
3	6	Chaos	Kyle Thornton	Defense	Notre Dame	Atlantic Coast Conference
3	7	Whipsnakes	Colin Squires	Defense	Denver	Big East Conference
3	8	Redwoods	Charlie Bertrand	Attack	Virginia	Atlantic Coast Conference
4	1	Cannon	Stephen Rehfuss	Attack	Syracuse	Atlantic Coast Conference
4	2	Atlas	Gerard Arceri	Face-off	Penn State	Big Ten Conference
4	3	Waterdogs	Ethan Walker	Midfield	Denver	Big East Conference
4	4	Chrome	Jackson Morrill	Attack	Denver	Big East Conference
4	5	Redwoods	Jamie Trimboli	Midfield	Syracuse	Atlantic Coast Conference
4	6	Chaos	Ryan Smith	Attack	Robert Morris	Independent
4	7	Whipsnakes	Nick Grill	Defense	Maryland	Big Ten Conference
4	8	Redwoods	Charlie Leonard	Face-off	Notre Dame	Big Ten Conference

== Coaching changes ==
- Cannons Lacrosse Club – Following weeks of uncertainty, Sean Quirk was officially named the head coach of Cannons Lacrosse Club on January 19. Quirk served from 2016 through the 2020 season as the head coach of the MLL's Boston Cannons. In 2020, he was named MLL Coach of the Year. On February 9, the Cannons announced the return of John Klepacki (Boston Cannons) and addition of Sean Kirwan (Virginia) to the assistant coaching staff.

== Tour Map ==
Tour locations for the 2021 PLL season

== Schedule ==
The 2021 tour schedule will run eleven weeks long, including three playoff weekends and an All-Star game. A total of 43 games will take place in this time frame.

Week	Date	Games	Time (ET)	Venue	City	Attendance	Ref.
1	June 4	Cannons; 11–12; Redwoods	7:00 pm	Gillette Stadium	Foxborough, MA (Boston)	TBD	
1	June 5	Whipsnakes; 13–7; Chaos	5:00 pm	Gillette Stadium	Foxborough, MA (Boston)	TBD	
1	June 5	Archers; 18–6; Atlas	7:45 pm	Gillette Stadium	Foxborough, MA (Boston)	TBD	
1	June 6	Waterdogs; 7–13; Cannons	1:00 pm	Gillette Stadium	Foxborough, MA (Boston)	TBD	
1	June 6	Chrome; 11–14; Redwoods	3:45 pm	Gillette Stadium	Foxborough, MA (Boston)	TBD	
2	June 11	Chaos; 12–14; Waterdogs	7:00 pm	Fifth Third Bank Stadium at Kennesaw State University	Kennesaw, GA (Atlanta)		
2	June 12	Whipsnakes; 15–14; Cannons	12:00 pm	Fifth Third Bank Stadium at Kennesaw State University	Kennesaw, GA (Atlanta)		
2	June 12	Redwoods; 9–12; Atlas	3:00 pm	Fifth Third Bank Stadium at Kennesaw State University	Kennesaw, GA (Atlanta)		
2	June 13	Chrome; 9–14; Waterdogs	1:00 pm	Fifth Third Bank Stadium at Kennesaw State University	Kennesaw, GA (Atlanta)		
2	June 13	Chaos; 8–12; Archers	3:45 pm	Fifth Third Bank Stadium at Kennesaw State University	Kennesaw, GA (Atlanta)		
3	June 25	Whipsnakes; 12–11; Atlas	8:00 pm	Homewood Field	Baltimore, MD		
3	June 26	Redwoods; 9–11; Chaos	5:15 pm	Homewood Field	Baltimore, MD		
3	June 26	Waterdogs; 8–17; Archers	8:00 pm	Homewood Field	Baltimore, MD		
3	June 27	Cannons; 17–18; Atlas	12:00 pm	Homewood Field	Baltimore, MD		
3	June 27	Chrome; 16–6; Whipsnakes	2:45 pm	Homewood Field	Baltimore, MD		
4	July 2	Archers; 7–8; Chrome	7:00 pm	Shuart Stadium	Hempstead Long Island (New York)		
4	July 3	Redwoods; 19–16; Waterdogs	12:00 pm	Shuart Stadium	Hempstead Long Island (New York)		
4	July 3	Cannons; 10–14; Chaos	3:00 pm	Shuart Stadium	Hempstead Long Island (New York)		
4	July 4	Chrome; 10–16; Atlas	12:15 pm	Shuart Stadium	Hempstead Long Island (New York)		
4	July 4	Whipsnakes; 15–14; Archers	3:00 pm	Shuart Stadium	Hempstead Long Island (New York)		
5	July 9	Waterdogs; 19–7; Cannons	8:00 pm	TCO Stadium	Eagan, MN (Minneapolis)		
5	July 10	Redwoods; 13–7; Whipsnakes	6:00 pm	TCO Stadium	Eagan, MN (Minneapolis)		
5	July 10	Atlas; 16–10; Chaos	8:45 pm	TCO Stadium	Eagan, MN (Minneapolis)		
5	July 11	Chrome; 6–12; Waterdogs	5:15 pm	TCO Stadium	Eagan, MN (Minneapolis)		
5	July 11	Cannons; 13–12; Archers	8:00 pm	TCO Stadium	Eagan, MN (Minneapolis)		
PLL All-Star Game	July 18	Adversaries; 23–21; Defenders	7:00 pm	PayPal Park	San Jose, CA		
PLL All-Star Game	July 18	Skills Competition	9:30 pm	PayPal Park	San Jose, CA		
7	July 30	Atlas; 19–10; Chrome	9:00 pm	Weidner Field	Colorado Springs, CO		
7	July 31	Archers; 15–12; Redwoods	7:15 pm	Weidner Field	Colorado Springs, CO		
7	July 31	Waterdogs; 11–6; Whipsnakes	10:00 pm	Weidner Field	Colorado Springs, CO		
7	August 1	Chaos; 14–12; Chrome	2:00 pm	Weidner Field	Colorado Springs, CO		
7	August 1	Atlas; 13–12; Cannons	4:45 pm	Weidner Field	Colorado Springs, CO		
8	August 13	Redwoods; 12–14; Whipsnakes	6:00 pm	Tom and Mary Casey Stadium at the University of Albany	Albany, NY		
8	August 13	Archers; 9–11; Chaos	8:30 pm	Tom and Mary Casey Stadium at the University of Albany	Albany, NY		
8	August 14	Atlas; 9–10; Waterdogs	4:15 pm	Tom and Mary Casey Stadium at the University of Albany	Albany, NY		
8	August 14	Cannons; 13–10; Chrome	7:00 pm	Tom and Mary Casey Stadium at the University of Albany	Albany, NY		
8	August 15	Chaos; 9–10; Redwoods	2:00 pm	Tom and Mary Casey Stadium at the University of Albany	Albany, NY		
8	August 15	Archers; 15–14; Whipsnakes	4:45 pm	Tom and Mary Casey Stadium at the University of Albany	Albany, NY		
9 Playoffs (Quarterfinals)	August 20	Archers; 10–13; Chaos	8:30 pm	Rio Tinto Stadium	Sandy, UT (Salt Lake City)		
9 Playoffs (Quarterfinals)	August 21	Atlas; 13–9; Cannons	2:30 pm	Rio Tinto Stadium	Sandy, UT (Salt Lake City)		
9 Playoffs (Quarterfinals)	August 21	Whipsnakes; 14–13; Redwoods	6:00 pm	Rio Tinto Stadium	Sandy, UT (Salt Lake City)		
10; Playoffs (Semifinals)	September 5	Atlas; 9–15; Chaos	11:00 am	Subaru Park	Chester, PA (Philadelphia)		
10; Playoffs (Semifinals)	September 5	Waterdogs; 10–14; Whipsnakes	1:30 pm	Subaru Park	Chester, PA (Philadelphia)		
11; PLL Championship	September 19	Whipsnakes; 9–14; Chaos	12:00 pm	Audi Field	Washington, D.C.		

== Championship ==
After falling in the 2020 PLL Championship in Utah last season as the underdog No. 7 seed, Chaos looked to avenge said loss against the same team this season in Whipsnakes, the two-time defending PLL champion. On the other hand, the Whips looked to solidify a dynasty to begin the PLL, hoping to secure a third title in the third year of the league's existence.

With a potent attack in players like Matt Rambo and Zed Williams, the Whips had the momentum and past success to favor them coming into the game on Sept. 19 at Audi Field in Washington D.C. However, it was Chaos who powered through and held that potent Whipsnakes attack silent as they won, 14–9, winning their first ever PLL Championship.

The Whips were held to just three goals in the second half and the aforementioned Williams/Rambo combo combined to record just two points and no goals in the championship. On the other end, it was Chaos's Dhane Smith who was the offensive star of the game and playoffs, recording a six-point game on the day. Smith had 18 points in the playoffs, averaging six points a game.

Three other players had four points or more for Chaos on the day in Chase Fraser, Josh Byrne and Chris Cloutier. Fraser's four goals led all scorers in the game. PLL league MVP Blaze Riorden turned in another MVP performance for Chaos in the championship, recording 15 saves in the game for a .625 save percentage. Riorden received PLL Championship Game MVP honors for his performance.

=== Championship Series bracket ===
Quarterfinals
3	Archers	10
6	Chaos	13
2	Atlas	13
7	Cannons	9
4	Redwoods	13
5	Whipsnakes	14
1	Waterdogs
BYE

Semi-Finals
6	Chaos	15
2	Atlas	9
1	Waterdogs	10
5	Whipsnakes	14

Championship
6	Chaos	14
5	Whipsnakes	9

== Standings ==
2021 Premier Lacrosse League Standings
Team	W	L	T	PCT	GB	SF	SA	Diff
Waterdogs	6	3	0	.667	—	111	98	13
Atlas	6	3	0	.667	—	120	108	12
Archers	5	4	0	.555	.5	119	95	24
Redwoods	5	4	0	.555	.5	110	106	4
Whipsnakes	5	4	0	.555	.5	102	112	-11
Chaos	4	5	0	.444	1	96	105	-9
Cannons	3	6	0	.333	1.5	110	105	-10
Chrome	2	7	0	.300	2	92	115	-22

Playoff Seed

Last updated: August 16, 2021

== All Star Game ==
The 2021 All-Star Game took place on Sunday, July 18 at PayPal Park in San Jose, California. It was broadcast on NBCSN and was sponsored by Cloudstrike, including the teams: Adversaries and Defenders. The two teams captains were Grant Ament (Archers) and Blaze Riordan (Chaos) The Adversaries won with a score of 23–21 over The Defenders. The MVP award went to goalie Tim Troutner who had 24 saves, including a behind-the-back goal, in a close win. With a total of 35 saves made in the game, $17,500 was donated to Oakland Lacrosse on behalf of Cloudstike with PLL Assist.

== Award finalists ==
On August 19, the PLL announced the finalists for the following awards:

=== Jim Brown Most Valuable Player ===
- Grant Ament (Attack, Archers)
- Zach Currier (Midfield, Waterdogs)
- Blaze Riorden (Goalie, Chaos)
- Jeff Teat (Attack, Atlas)
- Lyle Thompson (Attack, Cannons)

=== Rookie of the Year ===
- TD Ierlan (Faceoff, Redwoods)
- Stephen Rehfuss (Midfield, Cannons)
- Jeff Teat (Attack, Atlas)

=== Eamon McEneaney Attackman of the Year ===
- Grant Ament (Archers)
- Rob Pannell (Redwoods)
- Jeff Teat (Atlas)
- Lyle Thompson (Cannons)
- Zed Williams (Whipsnakes)

=== Gait Brothers Midfielder of the Year ===
- Bryan Costabile (Atlas)
- Zach Currier (Waterdogs)
- Myles Jones (Redwoods)
- Paul Rabil (Cannons)
- Tom Schreiber (Archers)

=== Dave Pietramala Defensive Player of the Year ===
- Liam Byrnes (Waterdogs)
- Matt Dunn (Whipsnakes)
- Garrett Epple (Redwoods)
- Graeme Hossack (Archers)
- Jack Rowlett (Chaos)

=== Paul Cantabene Faceoff Man of the Year ===
- Trevor Baptiste (Atlas)
- TD Ierlan (Redwoods)
- Joe Nardella (Whipsnakes)

=== Oren Lyons Goalie of the Year ===
- Adam Ghitelman (Archers)
- Blaze Riorden (Chaos)
- Dillon Ward (Waterdogs)

=== Brodie Merrill Long Stick Midfielder of the Year ===
- Michael Ehrhardt (Whipsnakes)
- Scott Ratliff (Archers)
- Ryland Rees (Waterdogs)

=== George Boiardi SSDM Hard Hat Award ===
- Zach Goodrich (Cannons)
- Latrell Harris (Archers)
- Danny Logan (Atlas)
- Ryan Terefenko (Chrome)

=== Dick Edell Coach of the Year ===
- Andy Copelan (Waterdogs)
- Ben Rubeor (Atlas)

=== Brendan Looney Leadership Award ===
- Steven DeNapoli (SSDM, Waterdogs)
- Kyle Harrison (Midfield, Redwoods)
- Blaze Riorden (Goalie, Chaos)

=== Jimmy Regan Teammate Award ===
- Mark Glicini (SSDM, Chaos)
- Jack Kelly (Goalie, Redwoods)
- Mikie Schlosser (Midfield, Waterdogs)

=== Welles Crowther Humanitarian Award ===
- Kyle Harrison (Midfield, Redwoods)
- Eric Law (Attack, Atlas)
- Lyle Thompson (Attack, Cannons)

=== Dave Huntley Sportsmanship Award ===
- Adam Ghitelman (Goalie, Archers)
- Eric Law (Attack, Atlas)
- Zed Williams (Attack, Whipsnakes)

== Award winners ==
Award	Recipient	Team	Position
Jim Brown Most Valuable Player	Blaze Riordan	Chaos	Goalie
Eamon McEneaney Attackman of the Championship Series	Grant Ament	Archers	Attack
Gait Brothers Midfielder of the Championship Series	Zach Currier	Waterdogs	Midfield
Dave Pietramala Defenseman of the Championship Series	Graeme Hossack	Archers	Defense
Oren Lyons Goalie Player of the Year	Blaze Riorden	Chaos	Goalie
Brodie Merrill Long Stick Midfielder of the Championship Series	Michael Ehrhardt	Whipsnakes	LSM
PLL Rookie of the Year	Jeff Teat	Atlas	Attack
Dick Edell Coach of the Year	Andy Copelan	Waterdogs	Head Coach
Paul Cantabene Face Off Athlete of the Championship Series	Trevor Baptiste	Atlas	Face-off
George Boiardi Hard Hat SSDM of the Championship Series	Danny Logan	Atlas	SSDM
Welles Crowther Humanitarian Award	Lyle Thompson	Cannons	Attack
Brendan Looney Leadership Award	Kyle Harrison	Redwoods	Midfield
Jimmy Regan Teammate Award	Jack Kelly	Redwoods	Goalie
Dave Huntley Sportmanship Award Award	Eric Law	Atlas	Attack

== Records, milestones, and notable statistics ==
- January 12 – The league reveals edits to the former Boston Cannons logo, a team crest, and motto for the upcoming season.

== League leaders ==
Points
Player	Team	Points	Average (per game)
Grant Ament	Archers	35	—
Jeff Teat	Atlas	35	—
Lyle Thompson	Cannons	32	—
Myles Jones	Redwoods	32	—
Josh Byrne	Chaos	29	—
Rob Pannell	Redwoods	29	—
Bryan Costabile	Atlas	28	—
Tom Schreiber	Archers	27	—
Paul Rabil	Cannons	26	—
Will Manny	Archers	26	—

Goals
Player	Team	Goals	Average (per game)
Lyle Thompson	Cannons	22	—
Zed Williams	Whipsnakes	22	—
Ryan Brown	Waterdogs	20	—
Will Manny	Archers	19	—
Ryan Drenner	Cannons	18	—
Jay Carlson	Whipsnakes	18	—
Josh Byrne	Chaos	17	—
Jeff Teat	Atlas	16	—
Paul Rabil	Cannons	16	—
Marcus Holman	Archers	16	—

Assists
Player	Team	Assists	Average (per game)
Grant Ament	Archers	22	—
Myles Jones	Redwoods	17	—
Jeff Teat	Atlas	16	—
Rob Pannell	Redwoods	16	—
Tom Schreiber	Archers	13	—
Dhane Smith	Chaos	13	—
Kieran McArdle	Waterdogs	12	—
Josh Byrne	Chaos	12	—
Zach Currier	Waterdogs	11	—
Stephen Rehfuss	Cannons	11	—

Save Percentage
Player	Team	Saves	Percentage
Adam Ghitelman	Waterdogs	95	62%
Blaze Riorden	Chaos	149	61%
Tim Troutner	Redwoods	125	58%
Drew Adams	Archers	35	56%
John Galloway	Chrome	118	56%
Nick Marrocco	Cannons	137	56%
Dillon Ward	Waterdogs	95	53%
Jack Concannon	Atlas	57	50%
J.D. Colarusso	Atlas	45	49%
Kyle Bernlohr	Whipsnakes	95	48%

Last Updated: August 16, 2021
