= Matt Rambo =

American lacrosse player

Personal information
- Born: July 25, 1994 (age 31) Glenside, Pennsylvania, U.S.
- Height: 5 ft 10 in (178 cm)
- Weight: 205 lb (93 kg; 14 st 9 lb)

Sport
- Position: Attack
- Shoots: Left
- NCAA team: Maryland (2017)
- NLL draft: 46th overall, 2017; New England Black Wolves
- NLL team: Philadelphia Wings
- MLL draft: 3rd overall, 2017; Charlotte Hounds
- MLL teams: Charlotte Hounds
- PLL team: Atlas Lacrosse Club
- Pro career: 2017–

Career highlights
- NCAA: 2017 NCAA Division I Men's Lacrosse title; 2017 Tewaaraton Award; 2017 Lt. Raymond Enners Award; 2x USILA All-American (2017, 2016); 2017 First Team All-America (USILA, Inside Lacrosse); 3x NCAA All-Tournament Team (2017, 2016, 2015); 2017 Big Ten Offensive Player of the Year; 2017 First Team All-Big Ten; 2016 Big Ten Tournament Most Valuable Player; 2015 First Team All-Big Ten; Set Maryland record for career goals, career points, career NCAA tournament points.; PLL: 2x PLL Champion (2019, 2020); PLL Championship MVP (2019); PLL Jim Brown MVP (2019); PLL Eamon McAnaney Attackman of the Year (2019); 2x PLL First Team All-Pro (2019, 2020); PLL Second Team All-Pro (2022); 3x PLL All-Star (2019, 2022, 2023); 2x PLL Points Leader (2019, 2020)

Matt Rambo (born July 25, 1994) is an American professional lacrosse attackman for the Atlas Lacrosse Club of the Premier Lacrosse League and the Philadelphia Wings of the National Lacrosse League. He played college lacrosse at Maryland.

== College career ==
Rambo spent four years at the University of Maryland, where he only missed one start his entire career, and reached the final four every year and the championship game in his final three years.

=== Freshman year ===
In Rambo's first game at Maryland, he scored four goals against the Mount St. Mary's Mountaineers. He ended the season with 30 goals and six assists.

=== Sophomore year ===
As a sophomore, Rambo became the first Maryland player to score 40 goals in a season since Joe Walters in 2004 and made First Team All Big Ten.

=== Junior year ===
Rambo became the first player in Maryland history to have 40 goals and 30 assists in one season after ending the year with 43 goals and 32 assists. These 75 points are third all-time in Maryland history. He helped Maryland win the Big Ten tournament and won Big Ten Tournament MVP and USILA All-American. Maryland lost in the 2016 NCAA Division I Men's Lacrosse Championship in a game that is considered a classic.

=== Senior year ===
Rambo started the season with 19 points in the first three games, which is the most by a Maryland player in a three-game span since Mike Mollot. In the final game of the season, on April 29, against Johns Hopkins, Rambo scored six points in the first 18 minutes, which broke the Maryland all-time points record. Rambo helped lead Maryland to their first NCAA Men's Lacrosse Championship in 42 years. Rambo also won the Tewaaraton Award, the highest award for a college lacrosse player. He was the first player in Maryland history to win the award.

== Professional career ==
=== MLL career ===
Rambo was drafted third overall in the 2017 Major League Lacrosse draft by the Charlotte Hounds. He had nine goals and six assists in six games for the Hounds that year.

=== NLL career ===
Rambo was drafted in the fifth round of the NLL draft by the New England Black Wolves, but decided to sit out the season and travel around doing clinics and camps instead of playing in the NLL. The next year, Rambo returned home to Pennsylvania for the start of his box lacrosse career after being selected 11th overall in the 2018 National Lacrosse League expansion draft to play for the Philadelphia Wings.

Rambo scored 26 goals and had 30 assists in 17 games in his first season in the NLL.

=== PLL career ===
In 2018, Rambo was announced as a member of Whipsnakes Lacrosse Club in the inaugural season of Paul Rabil's new Premier Lacrosse League. He was selected to the league's first All Star game in 2019, where he was a captain. Rambo led the league in points and assists during the 2019 regular season. He was named league MVP for the 2019 season during the awards show on Thursday, September 19.

On Saturday, September 21, Rambo scored both the game-tying goal with under a minute left and the sudden-victory game-winner in overtime in the PLL championship game against the Redwoods. He was named MVP of the game.

Rambo made first team all-pro for the 2019 PLL season.

== International career ==
Rambo represented the United States at the 2019 World Indoor Lacrosse Championship, where he recorded nine points in four games as the US won the bronze medal.

== Personal life ==
Rambo was raised in Abington, Pennsylvania and attended La Salle College High School.

== NCAA career statistics ==
Team	Season	GP	GS	G	A	Pts	GB	CT
Maryland	2014	17	17	30	6	36	19	3
Maryland	2015	19	18	40	19	59	28	2
Maryland	2016	20	20	43	32	75	23	6
Maryland	2017	19	19	42	45	87	30	5
Career		75	74	155	102	257	100	16

== MLL career statistics ==
Season	Team	Regular season											Playoffs										
Season	Team	GP	G	2PG	A	Pts	Sh	GB	Pen	PIM	FOW	FOA	GP	G	2PG	A	Pts	Sh	GB	Pen	PIM	FOW	FOA
2017	Charlotte Hounds	6	9	0	6	15	34	4	0	0	0	0	–	–	–	–	–	–	–	–	–	–	–
2018	Charlotte Hounds	13	27	0	20	47	93	19	0	1	0	0	–	–	–	–	–	–	–	–	–	–	–
		19	36	0	26	62	127	23	0	1	0	0	0	0	0	0	0	0	0	0	0	0	0
Career total:		19	36	0	26	62	127	23	0	1	0	0											

GP–Games played; G–Goals; 2PG–2-point goals; A–Assists; Pts–Points; Sh–Shots; GB–Ground balls; Pen–Penalties; PIM–Penalty minutes; FOW–Faceoffs won; FOA–Faceoffs attempted

== NLL career statistics ==
Matt Rambo		Regular season									Playoffs								
Season	Team	GP	G	A	Pts	LB	PIM	Pts/GP	LB/GP	PIM/GP	GP	G	A	Pts	LB	PIM	Pts/GP	LB/GP	PIM/GP
2019	Philadelphia Wings	17	26	30	56	36	17	3.29	2.12	1.00	–	–	–	–	–	–	–	–	–
2020	Philadelphia Wings	14	22	34	56	42	0	4.00	3.00	0.00	–	–	–	–	–	–	–	–	–
2022	Philadelphia Wings	15	21	33	54	39	0	3.60	2.60	0.00	1	3	0	3	3	0	3.00	3.00	0.00
2023	Philadelphia Wings	11	10	28	38	33	2	3.45	3.00	0.18	–	–	–	–	–	–	–	–	–
		57	79	125	204	150	19	3.58	2.63	0.33	1	3	0	3	3	0	3.00	3.00	0.00
Career Total:		58	82	125	207	153	19	3.57	2.64	0.33									

GP–Games played; G–Goals; A–Assists; Pts–Points; LB–Loose balls; PIM–Penalty minutes; Pts/GP–Points per games played; LB/GP–Loose balls per games played; PIM/GP–Penalty minutes per games played.

== PLL career statistics ==
Season	Team	Regular season											Playoffs										
Season	Team	GP	G	2PG	A	Pts	Sh	GB	Pen	PIM	FOW	FOA	GP	G	2PG	A	Pts	Sh	GB	Pen	PIM	FOW	FOA
2019	Whipsnakes LC	10	19	0	23	42	66	9	0	0	0	0	2	4	0	3	7	11	3	0	0	0	0
2020	Whipsnakes LC	6	7	0	18	25	22	6	0	0	0	0	–	–	–	–	–	–	–	–	–	–	–
2021	Whipsnakes LC	6	12	0	6	18	45	11	0	0	0	0	3	3	0	3	6	11	6	0	0	0	0
2022	Whipsnakes LC	10	21	0	11	32	76	15	0	0	0	0	1	2	0	8	10	0	0	0	0	0	0
2023	Whipsnakes LC	9	1,500	0	11	1,511	47	9	1	0.5	0	0	1	1	0	0	1	5	1	0	0	0	0
2024	Maryland Whipsnakes	9	12	0	6	18	41	8	1	0.5	0	0	3	3	0	0	3	19	6	2	1.5	0	0
2025	Maryland Whipsnakes	6	0	0	4	4	16	2	0	0	0	0	–	–	–	–	–	–	–	–	–	–	–
		56	1,571	0	79	1,650	313	60	2	1	0	0	10	13	0	14	27	27	16	2	1.5	0	0
Career total:		66	1,584	0	93	1,677	340	76	4	2.5	0	0											

GP–Games played; G–Goals; 2PG–2-point goals; A–Assists; Pts–Points; Sh–Shots; GB–Ground balls; Pen–Penalties; PIM–Penalty minutes; FOW–Faceoffs won; FOA–Faceoffs attempted Source:
