= Premier Lacrosse League All-Star Game =

2019 lacrosse game in California

The Premier Lacrosse League All-Star Game is a field lacrosse game played between the best players on two teams representing the Premier Lacrosse League (PLL).

The inaugural game took place on Sunday, July 22, during the 2019 season, at Banc of California Stadium in Los Angeles, California.

There was also an All-Star Skills Competition that took place on Saturday, July 21 that was streamed on NBC Sports Gold.

== Selection process ==
The PLL's inaugural All-Star Game featured the league's top 50 players selected by fans. Once the players were selected earlier this season, the PLL held an All-Star Draft on July 9 for team captains Trevor Baptiste of Atlas and Matt Rambo of the Whipsnakes, who both received the most fan votes, to select their 21 teammates.

== Broadcast ==
The game was broadcast on NBCSN. Analysts Brendan Burke and Ryan Boyle were the play-by-play commentators, along with sideline reporter Chantel McCabe who conducted in-game interviews.

Players from each team were mic'd up for "under-the-helmet" interviews with analyst Ryan Boyle up in the booth. They were Paul Rabil, Justin Guterding and Jarrod Neumann of Team Baptiste, as well as, opposing team captain Matt Rambo.

Syracuse Lacrosse player, Lacrosse Hall of Fame and Pro Football Hall of Fame inductee Jim Brown joined the analysts in the booth during halftime and also gave an opening speech to all the players before the game. Also, Chantel McCabe interviewed legendary lacrosse player Gary Gait during the second quarter.

== Rules ==
The standard PLL face-off rules were modified for the All-Star Game. (All quarters start with a face-off).

- 1st Quarter: Same as regular season with Lacrosse face-off.
- 2nd Quarter: Goalie begins play again after each goal scored.
- 3rd Quarter: "Hockey-style" face-off (like a puck-drop) is in effect.
- 4th Quarter/Overtime: Same rules as regular season.

== Teams ==
Team Rambo (captain Matt Rambo, wearing black/gray tie-dye uniforms) vs. Team Baptiste (captain Trevor Baptiste, wearing white/rainbow-colored tie-dye uniforms). All uniforms had name plates with the player's (@) Instagram profile names on the back of their jerseys.

== Outcome ==
Winners: The score was 17–16, Team Baptiste over Team Rambo with a second half comeback, scoring 9 of the final 13 goals of the game. The All-Star game MVP award (presented by Mike Rabil) went to goalie Jack Concannon who had 13 saves with only 5 goals allowed in the second half. The attendance was 8,189.

== Rosters ==
Team Baptiste
No.	Name	Team	Position	Name Plate
0	Tim Troutner	Redwoods	Goalie	@timothytroutner
1	Marcus Holman	Archers	Attack	@marcusholman1
1	Mike Chanenchuk	Whipsnakes	Midfield	@Mike_Chanencuk
2	Scott Ratliff	Archers	LSM	@ScottRatliff2
4	Will Manny	Archers	Attack	@willmanny1
5	Matt Kavanagh	Redwoods	Attack	@mattkavanagh_
9	Trevor Baptiste	Atlas	Face Off	@trevorbaptiste9
12	Jack Concannon	Atlas	Goalie	@_concannon_
13	Tyler Warner	Whipsnakes	Midfield	@_twarner5
14	Justin Guterding	Chrome	Attack	@guterball14
15	Myles Jones	Chaos	Midfield	@mylesjones15
18	Kyle Harrison	Redwoods	Midfield	@kyleharrison18
22	Josh Byrne	Chaos	Attack	@joshbyrne22
22	Ned Crotty	Chrome	Midfield	@crottykid22
22	Ryan Drenner	Whipsnakes	Attack	@ryandrenner
26	Tom Schreiber	Archers	Midfield	@tom_schneider26
43	Matthew Landis	Redwoods	Defense	@mattlandis43
51	Tucker Durkin	Atlas	Defense	@tdurkin51
52	Garrett Epple	Redwoods	Defense	@garrett_epple
81	Kyle Hartzell	Atlas	LSM	@khartzell81
88	Jarrod Neumann	Chaos	Defense	@jneu_xv
99	Paul Rabil	Atlas	Midfield	@paulrabil

Team Baptiste coaches:

- Head coach – Nat St. Laurent (Redwoods)
- Assistant coach – Andy Towers (Chaos)

Team Rambo
No.	Name	Team	Position	Name Plate
0	Blaze Riorden	Chaos	Goalie	@blazeriorden10
1	Joe Walters	Redwoods	Midfield	@jwalters1
2	Miles Thompson	Chaos	Attack	@miles74thompson
4	Ryan Brown	Atlas	Attack	@rbrownie4
5	Connor Fields	Chaos	Attack	@connorfields5
6	Bryce Young	Whipsnakes	Defense	@b_young41
7	Jules Heningburg	Redwoods	Attack	@julesheningburg
8	Brent Adams	Redwoods	Midfield	@brentadamsco
9	Matt Rambo	Whipsnakes	Attack	@rattmambo
11	Matt McMahon	Archers	Defense	@mattmcman
16	Mark Glicini	Chaos	Midfield	@mark_glic
23	Drew Snider	Whipsnakes	Midfield	@dsnides23
26	Michael Earnhardt	Atlas	LSM	@airheart12
32	Greg Gurenlian	Redwoods	Face-Off	@gregbeast32
32	Jordan Wolf	Chrome	Attack	@jwolf31
33	Conner Buczek	Atlas	Midfield	@cbuczek33
33	Matthew Dunn	Whipsnakes	Defense	@matt_dunn33
35	Kyle Bernlohr	Whipsnakes	Goalie	@kbernlohr35
48	Sergio Salcido	Redwoods	Midfield	@sergiosalcido48
54	Jake Froccaro	Chaos	Midfield	@simple__jake
77	Cade van Raaphorst	Atlas	Defense	@cvanrapp77
83	Jake Bernhardt	Whipsnakes	Midfield	@jak3bernhardt

Team Rambo coaches:

- Head coach – Jim Stagnitta (Whipsnakes)
- Assistant coach – Chris Bates (Archers)

== Skills Competition ==
The All-Star Skills Competition took place right after the All-Star game on NBC Sports Gold. The events featured were named:

- Fastest player – 5 of the fastest competitors run from the in line to the top of the opposite 2-point arc. The first 3 to cross the line move onto Round 2.
  - Participants: Brent Adams, Sergio Salcidd, Dan Eipp, Mark Glicini, Jarrod Neumann
    - Winner: Dan Eipp
- Adidas Freestyle Challenge – players have 30 seconds each to score 1 goal in the most creative way possible. Judges score with a 1 to 10 rating.
  - Participants: Connor Fields, Ryder Garnsey, Scott Ratliff, Ryan Drenner, Justin Guterding
    - Winner: Justin Guterding
- Goalie competition – 3 goalies will try and stop as many shots as possible in 30 seconds. The goalie who makes the most stops (save or a missed shot) wins the competition.
  - Participants: Kyle Bernlohr, Tim Troutner, Blaze Ridrden
    - Winner: Tim Troutner
- Vineyard Vines Accuracy Challenge – 6 competitors have 30 seconds to hit 5 targets in the cage as fast as they can from a distance of 10 yards.
  - Participants: Deemer Class, Ryan Brown, Will Manny, Tom Schreiber, Marcus Holman, Justin Guterding
    - Winner: Marcus Holman
- Fastest shot – 2 rounds, 2 shots per player from 10 yards out to score with the fastest MPH shot on goal.
  - Participants: Jarrod Neumann, Connor Buczek, Blaze Riorden, Jake Froccaro, Myles Jones, Michael Ehrhardt
    - Winner: Jarrod Neumann
