= Brennan O'Neill =

American lacrosse player (born 2002)

Personal information
- Nationality: American
- Born: April 12, 2002 (age 24) Bay Shore, New York, U.S.
- Height: 6 ft 3 in (191 cm)
- Weight: 250 lb (110 kg; 17 st 12 lb)

Sport
- Position: Attack
- Shoots: Left
- NCAA team: Duke (2024)
- NLL draft: 1st, 2024; Philadelphia Wings
- NLL team Former teams: San Diego Seals; Philadelphia Wings
- PLL team: Denver Outlaws
- Pro career: 2024–

Career highlights
- PLL: First Team All-Pro (2025); 3x All-Star (2024-26); Second Team All-Pro (2026); NCAA: 2023 Tewaaraton Award; 2023 Lt. Raymond Enners Award; ACC Offensive Player of the Year (2023); ACC Men's Lacrosse Scholar Athlete of the Year (2023); 4x All-ACC (2021-24); ACC Freshman of the Year (2021); ACC All-Academic Team (2021-23); 2x First Team All-American (2023-24); Second Team All-American (2022); Honorable Mention All-American (2021); International: 2023 World Lacrosse Championship MVP; 2023 World Lacrosse Championship Most Outstanding Midfielder
Medal record
Representing United States
Men's lacrosse
World Lacrosse Championship
Winner	2023 San Diego

Brennan O'Neill is an American professional lacrosse player who plays for the Denver Outlaws of the Premier Lacrosse League and San Diego Seals of the National Lacrosse League. He previously played college lacrosse for the Duke University Blue Devils. He is the winner of the 2023 Tewaaraton Award.

O'Neill was a member of the 2023 United States men's national lacrosse team at the offensive midfield position. That year, the team won the championship and O'Neill won the tournament MVP award.

Brennan O'Neill was the first draft pick in 2024 PLL draft. He is widely regarded as a generational talent.

== Early career ==
A native of Bay Shore, New York, O'Neill began playing lacrosse in second grade following in the footsteps of his older sister. He played varsity lacrosse in eighth grade for Bay Shore High School, recording 98 points to lead all of Long Island, before attending St. Anthony's High School in South Huntington. O'Neill played three seasons of varsity lacrosse for the Friars before his senior season was canceled due to the COVID-19 pandemic, where he scored 153 goals and had 66 assists for 219 points, winning the CHSAA Long Island championship as a junior in large part due to O'Neill scoring seven goals against rival Chaminade in the championship game, and he was named the US Lacrosse Magazine National Player of the Year that season. He also played football as a linebacker.

== College career ==
O'Neill originally committed to Penn State when he was 14 years old before switching his commitment to Duke. As a freshman, O'Neill led the Blue Devils with 45 goals and finished second on the team with 55 points, recording at least one point in all 17 games as Duke lost in the national semifinals. His sophomore season saw O'Neill once again lead Duke in goals with 53, while also adding 21 assists for a team best 74 points, although the team would miss the NCAA Tournament. As a junior, O'Neill led the nation with 97 points, winning both the Tewaaraton Award and Lt. Raymond Enners Award as the nation's top player, leading Duke to the national championship game where they lost to Notre Dame. That season, he was the only player in Division I lacrosse to finish in the top 20 nationally in points per game, goals, and assists.

== International career ==
After winning a gold medal at the 2022 U-21 World Lacrosse Championships, where he led Team USA with 18 goals and 25 points, O'Neill was selected to the United States men's national lacrosse team for the 2023 World Lacrosse Championship, being the only college player on the roster and the youngest player to represent the US in a World Championship since 2002. Playing as a midfielder instead of at his natural attack position, O'Neill scored 5 goals in the gold medal game, leading the US to a 10–7 victory over Canada, and he was named the tournament's best midfielder and MVP.

== Professional career ==
Brennan O'Neill was drafted first overall by the Denver Outlaws in the 2024 Premier Lacrosse League draft. He wears number 42 for the Denver Outlaws. Despite limited experience in the box game, Brennan was drafted first overall by the Philadelphia Wings of the National Lacrosse League in 2024, making him the fourth player ever to be selected first overall in the NLL and outdoor professional drafts, following Kevin Crowley, Lyle Thompson, and Jeff Teat, as well as the first American to be the first overall pick in the NLL draft since Casey Powell in 1998.

When the Wings ceased operations following the 2026 season, O'Neill was selected fifth overall in the 2026 NLL Dispersal Draft by the San Diego Seals.

== Statistics ==
=== NCAA ===
Team	Season	GP	GS	G	A	Pts	Sh	GB
Duke	2021	17	16	45	10	55	123	18
Duke	2022	17	17	53	21	74	163	26
Duke	2023	19	19	55	42	97	153	34
Duke	2024	19	19	54	27	81	182	34
Career		72	71	207	100	307	621	112

=== NLL ===
Brennan O'Neill		Regular season									Playoffs								
Season	Team	GP	G	A	Pts	LB	PIM	Pts/GP	LB/GP	PIM/GP	GP	G	A	Pts	LB	PIM	Pts/GP	LB/GP	PIM/GP
2025	Philadelphia Wings	18	25	32	57	47	2	3.17	2.61	0.11	–	–	–	–	–	–	–	–	–
2026	Philadelphia Wings	17	31	36	67	46	0	3.94	2.71	0.00	–	–	–	–	–	–	–	–	–
		35	56	68	124	93	2	3.54	2.66	0.06	0	0	0	0	0	0	0.00	0.00	0.00
Career Total:		35	56	68	124	93	2	3.54	2.66	0.06									

GP–Games played; G–Goals; A–Assists; Pts–Points; LB–Loose balls; PIM–Penalty minutes; Pts/GP–Points per games played; LB/GP–Loose balls per games played; PIM/GP–Penalty minutes per games played.

=== PLL ===
Season	Team	Regular season											Playoffs										
Season	Team	GP	G	2PG	A	Pts	Sh	GB	Pen	PIM	FOW	FOA	GP	G	2PG	A	Pts	Sh	GB	Pen	PIM	FOW	FOA
2024	Denver Outlaws	10	19	2	8	29	82	14	0	0	0	0	1	2	0	0	2	11	2	0	0	0	0
2025	Denver Outlaws	10	23	3	8	34	85	17	0	0	0	0	2	7	1	1	9	24	2	0	0	0	0
2026	Denver Outlaws	13	13	3	19	35	84	11	0	0	0	0	3	7	0	1	8	26	5	0	0	0	0
		33	55	8	35	98	251	42	0	0	0	0	6	16	1	2	19	61	9	0	0	0	0
Career total:		39	71	9	37	117	312	51	0	0	0	0											

GP–Games played; G–Goals; 2PG–2-point goals; A–Assists; Pts–Points; Sh–Shots; GB–Ground balls; Pen–Penalties; PIM–Penalty minutes; FOW–Faceoffs won; FOA–Faceoffs attempted
