= Jeff Teat =

Canadian lacrosse player (born 1997)

Personal information
- Nationality: Canadian
- Born: April 30, 1997 (age 29) Brampton, Ontario, Canada
- Height: 5 ft 10 in (178 cm)
- Weight: 170 lb (77 kg; 12 st 2 lb)

Sport
- Position: Attack (field), Forward (box)
- Shoots: Left
- NCAA team: Cornell (2021)
- NLL draft: 1st overall, 2020; New York Riptide
- NLL team Former teams: Oshawa FireWolves; New York Riptide; Ottawa Black Bears
- MLL draft: 25th overall, 2020; Boston Cannons
- PLL team: New York Atlas
- Pro career: 2021–

Career highlights
- NCAA: USILA All-American (First team 2018, second team 2019, honorable mention 2017); Inside Lacrosse All-American (First team 2018, second team 2019 & 2020, honorable mention 2017); All-Ivy League (First team 2018, 2019, second team 2017); NLL: Rookie of the Year (2022); 2x First team All-NLL (2023-24); 3x Second team All-NLL (2022, 2025-2026); Single season rookie record for assists (71); Single season rookie record for points (108); PLL: 1x PLL Champion (2025); 1x PLL Championship MVP (2025); 1x Jim Brown Most Valuable Player (2024); 1× Eamon McEneaney Attackman of the Year (2024); 2x First Team All-Pro (2021, 2024); 3x Second Team All-Pro (2022, 2023, 2025); 5x All-Star (2021-2025); Rookie of the Year (2021); Single season record for points (64); International: All-World Team (2023, 2024); 2024 World Lacrosse Box Championships MVP
Medal record
Representing Canada
Men's lacrosse
World Lacrosse Championship
Runner-up	2018 Netanya
Runner-up	2023 San Diego
Men's lacrosse sixes
World Games
Winner	2022 Birmingham
Men's box lacrosse
World Lacrosse Box Championships
Winner	2024 Utica

Jeffrey Steven Teat (born April 30, 1997) is a Canadian lacrosse player for the New York Atlas of the Premier Lacrosse League and the Oshawa FireWolves of the National Lacrosse League. He is one of five players in lacrosse history to be selected first overall in both the NLL and PLL/MLL drafts alongside Kevin Crowley, Lyle Thompson, Brennan O'Neill and CJ Kirst.

== Early life and career ==
Teat is the son of Maria and Dan Teat. Dan played fourteen seasons in the NLL and is currently an assistant coach for Panther City Lacrosse Club.

Teat attended The Hill Academy, playing five seasons of lacrosse there, as well as playing Junior A lacrosse for the Brampton Excelsiors, where he recorded 145 points during the regular season in his final season, the most of any OJALL player since John Grant Jr. Teat ended the season with 211 points, including the playoffs where Brampton got to the Ontario League semifinals.

== Collegiate career ==
Teat arrived at Cornell in the fall of 2016 as the number one recruit in his class according to Inside Lacrosse. With the Big Red, Teat was a three time USILA All-American and two time Tewaaraton Award nominee, as well as graduating third all time in assists and points at Cornell despite his senior season being cut short due to the COVID-19 pandemic.

== NLL career ==
Teat was selected first overall by the New York Riptide in the 2020 NLL Draft, although due to the pandemic, he would not make his debut until the 2022 season. During the 2022 season, Teat set a rookie record for assists and points as a rookie. He finished the season fourth in the league in total points, and second among rookies in loose balls, being named Rookie of the Year and second team all-NLL.

Heading into the 2023 NLL season, Inside Lacrosse ranked Teat the #2 best forward in the NLL.

Teat finished the 2023 season with 136 points, one shy of Dhane Smith's single season record, leading the league with 56 goals and finishing third with 80 assists. He finished third in MVP voting and was named first team all-NLL.

Teat signed a two-year contract extension with the Riptide on July 18, 2023.

The Riptide relocated to Ottawa and became the Ottawa Black Bears ahead of the 2024–25 season, and Teat was named the first captain in club history.

In 2026, Teat was selected first overall by the Oshawa FireWolves in the NLL Dispersal Draft following the folding of the Black Bears franchise.

== PLL career ==
Teat was originally selected by Chaos Lacrosse Club in the 2020 Premier College Draft and the Boston Cannons in the same year's MLL Draft, but he opted to return to Cornell for a fifth season instead of turning pro, causing both teams to lose his draft rights.

Teat was then drafted first overall by Atlas Lacrosse Club the following year, becoming the third player, after Lyle Thompson and Kevin Crowley to be selected first overall in the NLL and professional outdoor lacrosse drafts. He made an immediate impact, finishing second in scoring in the league despite missing two games, and being nominated for the Jim Brown MVP Award, as well as winning the Rookie of the Year Award.

Teat broke the PLL single season points record in the 2024 season en route to being named league MVP. He signed a 2-year extension with Atlas on April 12, 2025, as well as being named as a tri-captain alongside Trevor Baptiste and Danny Logan. In 2025, Teat helped Atlas capture their first PLL Championship, being named MVP of the championship game after a 6-point performance as they defeated the Denver Outlaws by a score of 14–13.

Teat missed the entirety of the 2026 season after undergoing shoulder surgery due to an injury sustained in the NLL.

== International career ==
Teat represented Team Canada in the 2016 Under-19 World Lacrosse Championship and 2018 World Lacrosse Championship, winning a silver medal at both events.

== Statistics ==
=== NCAA ===
Team	Season	GP	GS	G	A	Pts
Cornell	2017	13	13	33	39	72
Cornell	2018	18	18	37	62	99
Cornell	2019	15	15	34	36	70
Cornell	2020	5	5	12	15	27
Total		51	51	116	152	268

=== PLL ===
Season	Team	Regular season											Playoffs										
Season	Team	GP	G	2PG	A	Pts	Sh	GB	Pen	PIM	FOW	FOA	GP	G	2PG	A	Pts	Sh	GB	Pen	PIM	FOW	FOA
2021	Atlas	7	16	0	16	32	40	18	0	0	0	0	2	5	0	2	7	10	6	0	0	0	0
2022	Atlas	10	22	0	16	38	52	15	0	0	0	0	1	3	1	3	7	7	3	0	0	0	0
2023	Atlas	10	11	0	25	36	36	15	0	0	0	0	1	2	0	1	3	7	1	0	0	0	0
2024	New York Atlas	10	28	0	36	64	79	26	1	0.5	0	0	1	2	0	0	2	8	1	0	0	0	0
2025	New York Atlas	10	17	0	23	40	69	18	0	0	0	0	2	4	0	6	10	15	3	1	0.5	0	0
		47	94	0	116	210	276	92	1	0.5	0	0	7	16	1	12	29	47	14	1	0.5	0	0
Career total:		54	110	1	128	239	323	106	2	1	0	0											

GP–Games played; G–Goals; 2PG–2-point goals; A–Assists; Pts–Points; Sh–Shots; GB–Ground balls; Pen–Penalties; PIM–Penalty minutes; FOW–Faceoffs won; FOA–Faceoffs attempted

=== NLL ===
Jeff Teat		Regular season									Playoffs								
Season	Team	GP	G	A	Pts	LB	PIM	Pts/GP	LB/GP	PIM/GP	GP	G	A	Pts	LB	PIM	Pts/GP	LB/GP	PIM/GP
2022	New York Riptide	16	37	71	108	111	2	6.75	6.94	0.13	–	–	–	–	–	–	–	–	–
2023	New York Riptide	18	56	80	136	105	2	7.56	5.83	0.11	–	–	–	–	–	–	–	–	–
2024	New York Riptide	18	58	72	130	111	6	7.22	6.17	0.33	–	–	–	–	–	–	–	–	–
2025	Ottawa Black Bears	18	56	56	112	107	2	6.22	5.94	0.11	–	–	–	–	–	–	–	–	–
2026	Ottawa Black Bears	18	44	71	115	115	0	6.39	6.39	0.00	–	–	–	–	–	–	–	–	–
		88	251	350	601	549	12	6.83	6.24	0.14	0	0	0	0	0	0	0.00	0.00	0.00
Career Total:		88	251	350	601	549	12	6.83	6.24	0.14									

GP–Games played; G–Goals; A–Assists; Pts–Points; LB–Loose balls; PIM–Penalty minutes; Pts/GP–Points per games played; LB/GP–Loose balls per games played; PIM/GP–Penalty minutes per games played.
