= Kevin Crowley =

Canadian lacrosse player

Personal information
- Nickname: Big Cat
- Nationality: Canadian
- Born: November 13, 1988 (age 37) New Westminster, British Columbia, Canada
- Height: 6 ft 4 in (193 cm)
- Weight: 220 lb (100 kg; 15 st 10 lb)

Sport
- Position: Midfield (field), Forward (box)
- Shoots: Right
- NCAA team: Stony Brook (2011)
- NLL draft: 1st overall, 2011; Philadelphia Wings
- NLL team Former teams: Vancouver Warriors; San Diego Seals; Philadelphia Wings; New England Black Wolves; Toronto Rock; Philadelphia Wings
- MLL draft: 1st overall, 2011; Hamilton Nationals
- MLL teams: Hamilton Nationals; Florida Launch; Chesapeake Bayhawks; Charlotte Hounds; New York Lizards
- MSL team: Peterborough Lakers
- Pro career: 2012–
Medal record
Representing Canada
Men's lacrosse
World Lacrosse Championship
Winner	2014 Denver
Runner-up	2018 Netanya

Kevin Crowley (born November 13, 1988, in New Westminster, British Columbia) is a Canadian professional lacrosse player for the Vancouver Warriors in the National Lacrosse League Crowley is the first of only five players in the history of lacrosse to be drafted first overall in both the NLL and MLL/PLL drafts, with Lyle Thompson, Jeff Teat, Brennan O'Neill, and CJ Kirst following him. Crowley attended New Westminster Secondary School and played his collegiate lacrosse at Stony Brook University and Simon Fraser University.

== College career ==
- 2011 USILA Midfielder of the Year
- 2011 First team All-American
- 2010 Lt. Raymond Enners Award
- 2010 USILA Player of the Year
- 2010 First team All-American
- Unanimous America East Player of the Year
- Tewaaraton Trophy Finalist
- Stony Brook University's all-time leader in points with 232
- Stony Brook University's first first-team All American
- One of 40 players in Division 1 history to record 100 or more goals and assists
- One of three players in America East history to be named First team all 4 years

== NLL career ==
Kevin Crowley was drafted by the original Philadelphia Wings in the first round of the 2012 NLL Entry Draft. Crowley finished second in rookie scoring in 2012, and also was named to the 2012 NLL All-Star team. After the 2014 season, the Wings moved to Uncasville, Connecticut, becoming the New England Black Wolves. At the 2015 trade deadline, Crowley was traded to the Toronto Rock for holdout Garrett Billings.

After finishing the 2015 season in Toronto, Crowley was traded back to New England in exchange for first round pick Dan Lintner and a 2016 second round draft pick.

On January 5, 2019, Crowley was traded to the new expansion Philadelphia Wings, the replacement team in Philadelphia for the original team with whom Crowley moved to New England in 2014.

On August 22, 2022, Crowley signed with the San Diego Seals.

== MLL career ==
Crowley was the Hamilton Nationals’ first-round selection (first overall) in the 2011 MLL Collegiate Draft. After moving with the Nationals to Florida in 2014, Crowley was traded to the Chesapeake Bayhawks. After the 2015 season, Crowley was traded again, this time to the Charlotte Hounds. After a stint with the New York Lizards, Crowley was traded to the Philadelphia Barrage in May 2020, in the city where he already plays for the NLL indoor team.

== International lacrosse career ==
- 2010- Member of Team Canada, finalists in the 2010 World Lacrosse Championships in Manchester England
- 2008-Member of Team Canada's U-19 team, finalists in the 2008 U-19 World Lacrosse Championship in Coquitlam, British Columbia

== Canadian Lacrosse Association career ==
Crowley played for the New Westminster Salmonbellies of the Western Lacrosse Association and the West Coast Junior Lacrosse League. In 2011, he played for the Senior "A" New Westminster Salmonbellies and led the WLA playoffs with 39 points... Played five seasons for New Westminster in the WLA Junior "A" league... In 2009, he was voted the winner of the John Urban Award as the top graduating player... That same season he was a First Team All-Star and fourth in scoring... In 2009, he also played for the Senior "A" Salmonbellies

== Statistics ==
=== Stony Brook University ===
Season	GP	G	A	Pts	PPG
2008	14	22	26	48	3.4
2009	15	28	23	51	3.4
2010	17	51	26	77	4.5
2011	14	30	26	56	4.0
Totals	60	131	101	232	3.9

=== NLL ===
Kevin Crowley		Regular season									Playoffs								
Season	Team	GP	G	A	Pts	LB	PIM	Pts/GP	LB/GP	PIM/GP	GP	G	A	Pts	LB	PIM	Pts/GP	LB/GP	PIM/GP
2012	Philadelphia Wings	16	36	35	71	81	4	4.44	5.06	0.25	1	4	3	7	3	0	7.00	3.00	0.00
2013	Philadelphia Wings	16	34	38	72	64	7	4.50	4.00	0.44	1	2	0	2	7	2	2.00	7.00	2.00
2014	Philadelphia Wings	18	33	42	75	73	6	4.17	4.06	0.33	–	–	–	–	–	–	–	–	–
2015	New England Black Wolves	10	19	33	52	37	7	5.20	3.70	0.70	–	–	–	–	–	–	–	–	–
2015	Toronto Rock	4	6	6	12	12	0	3.00	3.00	0.00	4	4	6	10	9	0	2.50	2.25	0.00
2016	New England Black Wolves	18	33	57	90	67	6	5.00	3.72	0.33	3	6	9	15	17	2	5.00	5.67	0.67
2017	New England Black Wolves	18	45	40	85	80	11	4.72	4.44	0.61	1	2	1	3	5	0	3.00	5.00	0.00
2018	New England Black Wolves	18	51	25	76	73	2	4.22	4.06	0.11	1	0	4	4	3	0	4.00	3.00	0.00
2019	Philadelphia Wings	15	35	47	82	54	13	5.47	3.60	0.87	–	–	–	–	–	–	–	–	–
2020	Philadelphia Wings	14	20	51	71	58	10	5.07	4.14	0.71	–	–	–	–	–	–	–	–	–
2022	Philadelphia Wings	18	25	64	89	71	9	4.94	3.94	0.50	1	0	5	5	5	0	5.00	5.00	0.00
2023	San Diego Seals	18	14	32	46	55	6	2.56	3.06	0.33	1	3	3	6	4	0	6.00	4.00	0.00
2024	Vancouver Warriors	18	25	33	58	55	8	3.22	3.06	0.44	–	–	–	–	–	–	–	–	–
2025	Vancouver Warriors	18	22	31	53	45	6	2.94	2.50	0.33	3	4	4	8	7	0	2.67	2.33	0.00
		219	398	534	932	825	95	4.26	3.77	0.43	16	25	35	60	60	4	3.75	3.75	0.25
Career Total:		235	423	569	992	885	99	4.22	3.77	0.42									

GP–Games played; G–Goals; A–Assists; Pts–Points; LB–Loose balls; PIM–Penalty minutes; Pts/GP–Points per games played; LB/GP–Loose balls per games played; PIM/GP–Penalty minutes per games played.

=== MLL ===
Season	Team	Regular season											Playoffs										
Season	Team	GP	G	2PG	A	Pts	Sh	GB	Pen	PIM	FOW	FOA	GP	G	2PG	A	Pts	Sh	GB	Pen	PIM	FOW	FOA
2011	Hamilton Nationals	10	14	0	6	20	44	10	0	1	0	0	2	2	0	0	2	5	2	0	0	0	0
2012	Hamilton Nationals	12	24	0	13	37	73	12	0	1	0	1	–	–	–	–	–	–	–	–	–	–	–
2013	Hamilton Nationals	14	38	3	14	55	114	14	0	0	0	0	1	2	0	1	3	8	2	0	0	0	0
2014	Florida Launch	8	12	0	5	17	56	8	0	2.5	0	0	–	–	–	–	–	–	–	–	–	–	–
2014	Chesapeake Bayhawks	3	1	0	2	3	11	1	0	0	0	0	–	–	–	–	–	–	–	–	–	–	–
2015	Chesapeake Bayhawks	6	5	0	5	10	32	7	0	0.5	0	0	–	–	–	–	–	–	–	–	–	–	–
2016	Charlotte Hounds	7	10	0	12	22	41	5	0	3	0	0	1	2	0	0	2	9	3	0	1	0	0
2017	Charlotte Hounds	11	25	0	9	34	54	9	0	1.5	0	0	–	–	–	–	–	–	–	–	–	–	–
2018	Charlotte Hounds	7	6	0	3	9	27	2	0	1	0	0	–	–	–	–	–	–	–	–	–	–	–
2019	New York Lizards	16	18	0	9	27	47	21	0	5.5	0	0	–	–	–	–	–	–	–	–	–	–	–
		94	153	3	78	234	499	89	0	16	0	1	4	6	0	1	7	22	7	0	1	0	0
Career total:		98	159	3	79	241	521	96	0	17	0	1											

GP–Games played; G–Goals; 2PG–2-point goals; A–Assists; Pts–Points; Sh–Shots; GB–Ground balls; Pen–Penalties; PIM–Penalty minutes; FOW–Faceoffs won; FOA–Faceoffs attempted
