= MLL–PLL merger =

Unification of the two major professional outdoor lacrosse leagues

The MLL–PLL merger represented a unification of the two major professional field lacrosse leagues in the United States at the time: Major League Lacrosse (MLL) and the Premier Lacrosse League (PLL). Initial terms of the merger were released on the morning of December 16, 2020. The two leagues agreed to unite under the "Premier Lacrosse League" name and logo, operating as a tour-based model and removing the last of the hometown-based professional field lacrosse teams in the United States. The Boston Cannons would be the sole MLL team identity to play in the PLL for the 2021 season, rebranding as the Cannons Lacrosse Club.

== Background ==
=== Professional lacrosse foundations ===
Professional field lacrosse began with the creation of Major League Lacrosse, organized by Jake Steinfeld in summer 2001. With the exception of the smaller LXM Pro Tour appearance from 2010 to 2014, the MLL was unrivaled for professional talent for nearly two decades. From 2006 to 2008 the league competed with its high of 10 franchises, and in 2011 recorded its record average attendance at 6,417 per contest.

=== Emergence of the PLL ===
Paul Rabil and a group of investors first approached the MLL for a buyout in 2018 after declining attendance figures, stagnating wages, and player privacy concerns. Unable to come to an agreement, Rabil launched his own league set to begin to play in 2019 under the name "Premier Lacrosse League" (PLL). The Chernin Group, The Raine Group, and Joe Tsai among other major investors helped the PLL bring an innovative version of lacrosse to fans, with a focus on more professional athlete environments. Many of the top players from the MLL left for the PLL that first year, and more followed in 2020.

=== Competition between the leagues ===
The two leagues first operated with overlapping schedules in the summers of 2019, with the MLL crowning the Chesapeake Bayhawks league champions for a record sixth time just eight days after the Whipsnakes were crowned inaugural champions of the PLL. In response to the COVID-19 pandemic, both leagues played their 2020 seasons in a bubble format. The PLL played their games at Zions Bank Stadium in Herriman, Utah and the MLL played their games at Navy–Marine Corps Memorial Stadium in Annapolis, Maryland.

Two years proved to be enough pressure to force a change. Sportico broke the official merger news on the morning of December 16, 2020. NBC, the official broadcaster of the PLL, provided additional details later that day.

== Merger terms ==
To better transition to a single league entity, an internal team of front office personnel from both leagues will be overseeing offseason transitions. While there will no longer be any city-based professional field teams, the PLL agreed to add former MLL hometowns to the 2021 tour schedule and to commit to building local lacrosse programs in those areas. Of the seven MLL teams, only the Boston Cannons would bring their identity into the 2021 season. This rebranded Cannons Lacrosse Club would serve as an expansion team, with its roster created through an expansion draft of current PLL players and former MLL professionals now in the PLL player pool. The PLL does retain the rights to the former MLL team identities with the option to use these brands in future expansion.

=== Post-merger teams ===
Final MLL franchise locations

Team	Joined	Head coach
Archers Lacrosse Club	2019	Chris Bates
Atlas Lacrosse Club	2019	Ben Rubeor
Chaos Lacrosse Club	2019	Andy Towers
Chrome Lacrosse Club	2019	Tim Soudan
Redwoods Lacrosse Club	2019	Nat St. Laurent
Whipsnakes Lacrosse Club	2019	Jim Stagnitta
Waterdogs Lacrosse Club	2020	Andy Copelan
Cannons Lacrosse Club	2021	Sean Quirk

=== Retired MLL teams ===
Team	Founded	Ceased
Charlotte Hounds	2012	2018
Chesapeake Bayhawks	2001	2020
Connecticut Hammerheads	2020	2020
Denver Outlaws	2006	2020
New York Lizards	2001	2020
Ohio Machine	2012	2018
Philadelphia Barrage	2001	2020

== Aftermath ==
The newly rebranded Cannons Lacrosse Club will retain the full history of the Boston Cannons as a founding MLL franchise. This includes 20 years of history and two professional lacrosse championships. The Chesapeake Bayhawks holds the record for most professional championships at 6, but by way of the merger, the Cannons will now join the Whipsnakes in a tie for most championships by an active team with two each. The Bayhawks and New York Lizards were also original MLL teams founded in 2001, but will have seen their franchises cease operations with an uncertain future.

For at least the first season post-merger, the expanded PLL returned to a tour-based model. The season began on June 4, 2021, and concluded on September 19 with the championship game.

== See also ==
- ABA–NBA merger
- AFL–NFL merger
- NHL–WHA merger
