= Midfielder (lacrosse) =

Players that play both offense and defense and transitioning the ball

In men's field lacrosse, midfielders (also known as middies or the middy) clear the ball during the game. Midfielders do most of the running out of all the players, as they are allowed to cross the middle line (unlike other players) and play as attack and defence.

== Rules ==
There are only 3 midfielders allowed on the field at one time by each team. They are allowed to cross the midline, unlike the attackmen and defenders. The only time they are not allowed to have 3 midfielders on the field is if there is a penalty. If there is one penalty on one player, then there can only be two midfielders on the team. If there are two people in the penalty box because these two people both got penalties, then there can only be one midfielder on the field at the time. Midfielders are allowed to substitute throughout the game at any time through a certain area on the sideline in between both benches of the teams.

== Equipment ==
Midfielders are required to wear a chest pad, elbow pads, gloves, a helmet, and a mouthguard. They are required to have a chest pad that meets NOCSAE (National Operating Committee on Standards for Athletic Equipment) standards. The gloves must not have any huge holes on their palms. They are also required to have a stick which meets the NCAA regulations. Midfielders can have either a 3 foot stick or a 6 foot stick.

== Role ==
Midfielders can play offense and defense. This makes midfielders the most versatile players on the field as they must play both sides of the ball. For younger lacrosse players, usually in elementary school and middle school, midfielders will play both offense and defense. For older players who are in college and play professionally for the PLL, midfielders will usually specialize in either offense or defense.

== Objectives ==
The main objective of a midfielder is to transition the ball from defense to offense. Midfielders will try their best to connect passes to move the ball towards their offensive side, or they can try to run with the ball to the other side of the field. Midfielders also have a lot of other objectives depending on what type of midfielder they are.

== Types of Midfielders ==
=== Offensive Midfielder (Attacking Midfielder) ===
An offensive midfielder is a midfielder that plays offense. They will play when the team does have the ball. They join the attackmen to make up 6 players and will try their best to score on the opposing teams defense and goalie. Their role is to try and score, or feed the attackmen so they can try their best to score.

=== Defensive Midfielder ===
A defensive midfielder is a player that plays defense as a midfielder. They will play when the team does not have the ball. A defensive midfielder may have a long stick or a short stick. Defensive midfielders also must clear the ball usually, which means to try and get the ball from the defensive side to the offensive side.

=== LSM ===
LSM stands for Long Stick Midfielder. This position is a special type of defensive midfielder. They are special because they are the only midfielders allowed to use 6 foot poles. They play defense like a normal defensive midfielders. Each team is only allowed to have 4 long stick (6 feet sticks) players on the field at a time. Therefore that usually means that there will be 3 defensemen with 6 feet poles, and one LSM with a 6 foot pole on the field when playing defense.

=== Two-way Midfielder ===
A two-way midfielder is a midfielder that will play both offense and defense. These players usually are good at everything including shooting, dodging, and playing defense. At the younger levels of lacrosse all midfielders are usually considered two-way midfielders.

=== Winger ===
The winger is a Middie that specializes in playing on the wings on a face-off. Their job is to start on the restraining line on the fields, when the whistle is blown, they will run toward where the face-off is taken place and will try and get the loose ball if there is one.

=== FOGO ===
FOGO is an acronym meaning Face-off and Go-off. These players are technically midfielders, although in high school, college, and professional they are usually considered a different position. This special position are the people who take the face-off and then run off the field to get a substitution from a defensive middy or offensive middy once one team has possession of the ball.

== Notable field lacrosse midfielders ==
- Kyle Harrison
- Trevor Baptiste
- Ned Crotty
- Zach Currier
- T. D. Ierlan
- Myles Jones
- Danny Logan
- Paul Rabil
- Tom Schreiber
