= 2019 Premier Lacrosse League season =

Inaugural season of the Premier Lacrosse League

- League: Premier Lacrosse League
- Sport: Field lacrosse
- Duration: June 1 - September 21
- Teams: 6

Draft
- Top draft pick: Pat Spencer
- Picked by: Utah Archers

Regular season
- Season MVP: Matt Rambo (Maryland Whipsnakes)
- Top scorer: Marcus Holman (Utah Archers)

Playoffs
- Finals champions: Maryland Whipsnakes
- Runners-up: California Redwoods (lacrosse)
- Finals MVP: Matt Rambo (Whipsnakes)

PLL seasons
- 2020 →

The 2019 Premier Lacrosse League season was the inaugural season of the Premier Lacrosse League (PLL). The season began on Saturday, June 1 at Gillette Stadium in Foxborough, Massachusetts and culminated with a championship game played on Saturday, September 21 at Talen Energy Stadium, now known as Subaru Park, in the Philadelphia suburb of Chester, Pennsylvania. Whipsnakes Lacrosse Club defeated Redwoods Lacrosse Club to claim the league title.

== Tour Map ==
Tour locations for the 2019 PLL season

== Schedule ==
Week	Date	Games	Time (ET)	Venue	City	Attendance	Ref.
1	June 1	Archers 13–12 (OT) Chrome	1:00 pm	Gillette Stadium	Foxborough, MA	13,681 over two days	
1	June 1	Whipsnakes 15–14 (OT) Chaos	4:00 pm	Gillette Stadium	Foxborough, MA	13,681 over two days	
1	June 2 (‡)	Atlas 9–11 Redwoods	1:30 pm	Gillette Stadium	Foxborough, MA	13,681 over two days	
2	June 8	Chrome 11–12 (OT) Whipsnakes	1:00 pm	Red Bull Arena	Harrison, NJ	10,773 over two days	
2	June 8	Archers 10–9 Redwoods	4:00 pm	Red Bull Arena	Harrison, NJ	10,773 over two days	
2	June 9	Atlas 13–18 Chaos	2:00 pm	Red Bull Arena	Harrison, NJ	10,773 over two days	
3	June 15	Redwoods 11–12 (OT) Chaos	2:00 pm	SeatGeek Stadium	Bridgeview, IL (Chicago)	11,398 over two days	
3	June 15	Whipsnakes 11–10 (OT) Archers	5:00 pm	SeatGeek Stadium	Bridgeview, IL (Chicago)	11,398 over two days	
3	June 16	Chrome 12–13 Atlas	2:30 pm	SeatGeek Stadium	Bridgeview, IL (Chicago)	11,398 over two days	
4	June 22 (‡)	Chrome 11–13 Redwoods	1:00 pm	Homewood Field	Baltimore, MD	16,701 over two days	
4	June 22 (‡)	Whipsnakes 15–10 Atlas	7:30 pm	Homewood Field	Baltimore, MD	16,701 over two days	
4	June 23 (‡)	Archers 13–14 Chaos	3:30 pm	Homewood Field	Baltimore, MD	16,701 over two days	
5	June 28	Atlas 13–12 Archers	8:00 pm	Georgia State Stadium	Atlanta, GA	11,212 over two days	
5	June 29	Chaos 15–14 (OT) Chrome	1:00 pm	Georgia State Stadium	Atlanta, GA	11,212 over two days	
5	June 29	Whipsnakes 11–14 Redwoods	4:00 pm	Georgia State Stadium	Atlanta, GA	11,212 over two days	
6	July 6	Archers 8–9 Redwoods	5:00 pm	Audi Field	Washington, DC	14,209 over two days	
6	July 6	Whipsnakes 11–9 Atlas	8:00 pm	Audi Field	Washington, DC	14,209 over two days	
6	July 7	Chrome 19–11 Chaos	3:00 pm	Audi Field	Washington, DC	14,209 over two days	
PLL All-Star Game	July 21	Skills Competition	5:00 pm	Banc of California Stadium	Los Angeles, CA	8,189	
PLL All-Star Game	July 21	Team Baptiste 17–16 Team Rambo	8:00 pm	Banc of California Stadium	Los Angeles, CA	8,189	
8	July 27	Atlas 18–15 Redwoods	5:00 pm	Dick's Sporting Goods Park	Commerce City, CO (Denver)	12,892 over two days	
8	July 27	Chaos 13–12 Whipsnakes	8:00 pm	Dick's Sporting Goods Park	Commerce City, CO (Denver)	12,892 over two days	
8	July 28	Archers 9–7 Chrome	4:00 pm	Dick's Sporting Goods Park	Commerce City, CO (Denver)	12,892 over two days	
9	August 10	Redwoods 10–13 Chaos	4:00 pm	Avaya Stadium	San Jose, CA	11,317 over two days	
9	August 10	Chrome 20–16 Whipsnakes	7:00 pm	Avaya Stadium	San Jose, CA	11,317 over two days	
9	August 11	Archers 15–11 Atlas	7:30 pm	Avaya Stadium	San Jose, CA	11,317 over two days	
10	August 17	Chaos 11–10 Archers	12:30 pm	Tim Hortons Field	Hamilton, ON	10,097 over two days	
10	August 17	Chrome 14–17 Atlas	3:30 pm	Tim Hortons Field	Hamilton, ON	10,097 over two days	
10	August 18	Whipsnakes 17–4 Redwoods	6:00 pm	Tim Hortons Field	Hamilton, ON	10,097 over two days	
11	August 24	Atlas 12–9 Chaos	8:00 pm	Tom & Mary Casey Stadium	Albany, NY	12,522 over two days	
11	August 25	Redwoods 18–7 Chrome	1:30 pm	Tom & Mary Casey Stadium	Albany, NY	12,522 over two days	
11	August 25	Whipsnakes 8–11 Archers	4:30 pm	Tom & Mary Casey Stadium	Albany, NY	12,522 over two days	
Playoffs (Round 1)	September 6	Redwoods 16–12 Archers	7:00 pm	Mapfre Stadium	Columbus, OH	11,778 over two days	
Playoffs (Round 1)	September 7	Chrome 8–17 Atlas	3:00 pm	Mapfre Stadium	Columbus, OH	11,778 over two days	
Playoffs (Round 1)	September 7	Whipsnakes 15–7 Chaos	6:00 pm	Mapfre Stadium	Columbus, OH	11,778 over two days	
Playoffs (Round 2)	September 14	Chrome 10–12 Archers	5:00 pm	Red Bull Arena	Harrison, NJ	10,572	
Playoffs (Round 2)	September 14	Redwoods 10–7 Chaos	8:00 pm	Red Bull Arena	Harrison, NJ	10,572	
PLL Championship	September 21	Draft Pick Game: Atlas 7–25 Archers	11:30 am	Talen Energy Stadium	Chester, PA (Philadelphia)	12,556	
PLL Championship	September 21	Championship Game: Whipsnakes 12–11 (OT) Redwoods	2:30 pm	Talen Energy Stadium	Chester, PA (Philadelphia)	12,556	

‡ = joint event with the Women's Professional Lacrosse League

== Standings ==
2019 Premier Lacrosse League Standings
Team	W	L	PCT	GB	GF	2ptGF	GA
Chaos	7	3	.700	—	130	12	129
Whipsnakes	6	4	.600	1	128	12	116
Archers	5	5	.500	2	111	6	105
Redwoods	5	5	.500	2	114	2	116
Atlas	5	5	.500	2	125	8	132
Chrome	2	8	.200	5	127	7	137

PLAYOFFS

Semifinals
1	Chaos	7
2	Whipsnakes	15
3	Archers	12
4	Redwoods	16

Preliminary final
1	Chaos	7
4	Redwoods	10

Final
2	Whipsnakes	12 (OT)
4	Redwoods	11

== College draft ==
The collegiate draft occurred on April 23 and was broadcast on NBCSN at 6:00 PM EDT. It was hosted by sportscaster Paul Burmeister with help from draft analyst Ryan Boyle. A draft lottery was released on the league's YouTube channel on April 8 to determine the top six picks.

Format:

- Each club was awarded four picks.
- The draft order was selected at random and reversed each round until the draft was completed. (The first team with the first pick went last in round two, giving the team who went last in round one to go first in round two). A one-minute countdown clock was started for picks.
- Eligible players must currently be in their senior season.
- No current picks could be traded for picks in a future draft.
- No trading of players already on rosters for draft picks.

Rnd.	Pick #	PLL Team	Player	Pos.	College	Conf.
1	1	Archers	Pat Spencer	Attack	Loyola (MD)	Patriot League
1	2	Atlas	Ryan Conrad	Midfield	Virginia	Atlantic Coast Conference
1	3	Chrome	Zach Goodrich	Midfield	Towson	Colonial Athletic Association
1	4	Whipsnakes	Alex Woodall	Face-off	Towson	Colonial Athletic Association
1	5	Redwoods	Clarke Petterson	Attack	Cornell	Ivy League
1	6	Chaos	Johnny Surdick	Defense	Army	Patriot League
2	7	Chaos	Jack Rowlett	Defense	North Carolina	Atlantic Coast Conference
2	8	Redwoods	Tyler Dunn	Midfield	Penn	Ivy League
2	9	Whipsnakes	Brad Smith	Midfield	Duke	Atlantic Coast Conference
2	10	Chrome	Chris Sabia	Defense	Penn State	Big Ten Conference
2	11	Atlas	Cade Van Raaphorst	Defense	Duke	Atlantic Coast Conference
2	12	Archers	Curtis Corley	Defense	Maryland	Big Ten Conference
3	13	Archers	Colton Jackson	Midfield	Denver	Big East Conference
3	14	Atlas	Noah Richard	Midfield	Marquette	Big East Conference
3	15	Chrome	Max Tuttle	Midfield	Sacred Heart	Northeast Conference
3	16	Whipsnakes	Isaac Paparo	Defense	UMass	Colonial Athletic Association
3	17	Redwoods	Brendan Gleason	Attack	Notre Dame	Atlantic Coast Conference
3	18	Chaos	Greyson Torain	Defense	Navy	Patriot League
4	19	Chaos	Austin Henningsen	Face-off	Maryland	Big Ten Conference
4	20	Redwoods	Tim Troutner	Goalie	High Point	Southern Conference
4	21	Whipsnakes	John Daniggelis	Midfield	Yale	Ivy League
4	22	Chrome	Connor Farrell	Faceoff	Long Island Post	East Coast Conference
4	23	Atlas	Brent Noseworthy	Midfield	Michigan	Big Ten Conference
4	24	Archers	John Prendergast	Midfield	Duke	Atlantic Coast Conference

== All Star Game ==
The inaugural 2019 All-Star Game took place on Sunday, July 21 at Banc of California Stadium in Los Angeles, California. It was broadcast on NBCSN. The two teams captains were Matt Rambo (Whipsnakes) and Trevor Baptiste (Atlas) Team Baptiste won with a score of 17–16 over Team Rambo. The MVP award went to goalie Jack Concannon who had 13 saves in the second half comeback win.

== Championship ==
The Whipsnakes outlasted the Redwoods 12–11 in overtime to claim the inaugural PLL Championship. The ninth overtime game of PLL season was the most exciting.

After a defensive first quarter with a 1–1 tie, the game heated up in the second quarter when the Whipsnakes went on a 5–0 run.

After halftime, the Whipsnakes continued their goal streak with a 4–0 run. However, being down by 7 goals, the Redwoods mounted an amazing comeback when they scored 6 goals (including a 2-point shot), pulling within 2 points if the Whipsnakes (10–8) in the third quarter.

The fourth quarter saw the Redwoods tie it up with 5:49 left to play. Then the Redwoods scored one more to pull ahead. But local product and league MVP Matt Rambo tied it with just 21.2 seconds remaining. The Whipsnakes won it in overtime and Rambo who scored the winning goal earned the Championship MVP.

== League leaders ==
Points
Player	Team	Points	Average (per game)
Matt Rambo	Whipsnakes	42	4.2
Tom Schreiber	Archers	37	3.7
Justin Guterding	Chrome	35	3.5
Connor Fields	Chaos	33	3.7
Jules Heningburg	Redwoods	33	3.7

Goals
Player	Team	Goals	Average (per game)
Marcus Holman	Archers	23	2.3
Will Manny	Archers	22	2.2
Connor Fields	Chaos	22	2.2
Jules Heningburg	Redwoods	21	2.1
Ryan Brown	Atlas	21	2.1

Assists
Player	Team	Assists	Average (per game)
Matt Rambo	Whipsnakes	23	2.3
Tom Schreiber	Archers	18	1.8
Jordan Wolf	Chrome	16	1.6
Justin Guterding	Chrome	14	1.4
Kieran McArdle	Atlas	13	1.3

Save Percentage
Player	Team	Percentage
Drew Adams	Archers	65.3%
Brett Queener	Chrome	56.5%
Blaze Riorden	Chaos	55.8%
Kyle Bernlohr	Whipsnakes	55.0%
Jack Concannon	Atlas	53.5%

== Awards ==
Award	Recipient	Team	Position	Ref.
Jim Brown Most Valuable Player	Matt Rambo	Whipsnakes	Attack	
Eamon McEneaney Attackman of the Year	Matt Rambo	Whipsnakes	Attack	
Gait Brothers Midfielder of the Year	Tom Schreiber	Archers	Midfield	
Dave Pietramala Defensive Player of the Year	Jarrod Neumann	Chaos	Defence	
Oren Lyons Goalie Player of the Year	Blaze Riorden	Chaos	Goalie	
Brodie Merrill Long Stick Midfielder of the Year	Michael Ehrhardt	Whipsnakes	LSM	
PLL Rookie of the Year	Tim Troutner	Redwoods	Goalie	
Dick Edell Coach of the Year	Andy Towers	Chaos	Coach	
Paul Cantabene Face Off Athlete of the Year	Trevor Baptiste	Atlas	Face-off	
George Boiardi Hard Hat Award (SSDM)	Dominque Alexander	Archers	SSDM	
Welles Crowther Humanitarian Award	Scott Ratliff	Archers	LSM	
Brendan Looney Leadership Award	Kyle Harrison	Redwoods	Midfield	
Jimmy Regan Teammate Award	Mark Glicini	Chaos	Midfield	
Dave Huntley Sportmanship Award Award	Connor Farrel	Chrome	Face-off	
