= Myles Jones =

American lacrosse player (born 1993)

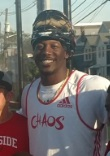

Personal information
- Nationality: United States
- Born: March 15, 1993 (age 33) Rockville Centre, New York, U.S.
- Height: 6 ft 5 in (196 cm)
- Weight: 260 lb (120 kg; 18 st 8 lb)

Sport
- Position: Midfielder (Field), Transition (Box)
- Shoots: Right
- NCAA team: Duke (2016)
- NLL draft: 37th overall, 2016; New England Black Wolves
- NLL teams: New York Riptide
- MLL draft: 1st overall, 2016; Atlanta Blaze
- MLL teams: Atlanta Blaze; Chesapeake Bayhawks
- PLL team Former teams: Atlas Lacrosse Club; Chaos Lacrosse Club; Redwoods Lacrosse Club
- Pro career: 2016–

Career highlights
- PLL: 1x Champion (2025); 3x All-Star (2019, 2021, 2022); 1x All-Pro (2021); MLL: 2x All-Star (2017-2018); 1x All-Star Game MVP (2017)

Myles Jones (born March 15, 1993) is an American professional lacrosse player with Atlas Lacrosse Club of the Premier Lacrosse League. He attended Walt Whitman High School in Huntington Station, New York, completed a post-graduate year at Salisbury School in Salisbury, Connecticut and played collegiate lacrosse at Duke University.

His signature move is the bull dodge.

== MLL career ==
Jones was selected 1st overall in the 2016 Major League Lacrosse draft by the Atlanta Blaze. After just 2 games with Atlanta, he was traded to the Chesapeake Bayhawks along with Atlanta's 2017 2nd round college draft pick for midfielder Matt Mackrides and Chesapeake's 2017 1st round college draft pick.

In 2017, Jones was selected to the MLL All Star Game and was named the All Star Game MVP after scoring 4 goals and an assist, including the game-winning goal.

== PLL career ==
In October 2018, it was announced that Jones was one of over 140 players who had signed contracts agreeing to play in the newly formed Premier Lacrosse League. Jones was selected to play in the 2019 PLL All-Star Game for Team Baptiste.

On February 29, 2020, Jones was traded from Chaos to Redwoods in exchange for Sergio Salcido and a second-round pick in the 2020 PLL College Draft.

After a poor start to the 2023 season which saw Jones scratched from the lineup, Jones was traded on August 7, 2023, to Atlas Lacrosse Club in exchange for Romar Dennis.

== NLL career ==
Jones was a fourth-round pick of the New England Black Wolves in the 2016 NLL Entry Draft, however he never played for the team, citing unfamiliarity with the indoor game. On September 13, 2019, his rights were traded to the expansion New York Riptide, along with Ryan Fournier and the 24th overall pick in the 2019 NLL Entry Draft, in exchange for Jordan Dunston. On January 20, 2020, Jones agreed to a protected practice player contract with the Riptide of the National Lacrosse League, making his NLL debut five days later.

== Awards and achievements ==
=== College ===
- 2013 NCAA Division I Men's Lacrosse Championship Winner (Duke)
- 2014 NCAA Division I Men's Lacrosse Championship Winner (Duke)
- 2014 USILA Second Team All-American
- 2015 USILA First Team All-American
- 2015 Lt. Donald MacLaughlin Jr. Award
- 2016 USILA First Team All-American
- 2016 Lt. Donald MacLaughlin Jr. Award

=== Professional ===
- 2019 PLL All-Star

== Statistics ==
=== PLL ===
Season	Team	Regular season											Playoffs										
Season	Team	GP	G	2PG	A	Pts	Sh	GB	Pen	PIM	FOW	FOA	GP	G	2PG	A	Pts	Sh	GB	Pen	PIM	FOW	FOA
2019	Chaos LC	10	7	1	10	18	43	9	0	0	0	0	2	2	0	1	3	8	4	1	0.5	0	0
2020	Redwoods LC	6	6	2	5	13	30	7	2	1.5	0	0	–	–	–	–	–	–	–	–	–	–	–
2021	Redwoods LC	9	14	1	17	32	39	14	0	0	0	0	1	0	0	0	0	4	1	1	0.5	0	0
2022	Redwoods LC	10	12	3	7	22	55	5	2	1	0	0	1	1	0	0	1	4	3	0	0	0	0
2023	Redwoods LC	5	3	0	0	3	20	3	1	1	0	0	–	–	–	–	–	–	–	–	–	–	–
2023	Atlas LC	3	3	0	4	7	12	3	0	0	0	0	1	1	0	1	2	7	0	0	0	0	0
2024	New York Atlas	10	10	2	6	18	36	13	1	1	0	0	1	1	0	0	1	3	0	0	0	0	0
2025	New York Atlas	3	1	0	4	5	5	2	0	0	0	0	–	–	–	–	–	–	–	–	–	–	–
		56	56	9	53	118	240	56	6	4.5	0	0	6	5	0	2	7	19	8	2	1	0	0
Career total:		62	61	9	55	125	259	64	8	5.5	0	0											

GP–Games played; G–Goals; 2PG–2-point goals; A–Assists; Pts–Points; Sh–Shots; GB–Ground balls; Pen–Penalties; PIM–Penalty minutes; FOW–Faceoffs won; FOA–Faceoffs attempted

=== MLL ===
Season	Team	Regular season											Playoffs										
Season	Team	GP	G	2PG	A	Pts	Sh	GB	Pen	PIM	FOW	FOA	GP	G	2PG	A	Pts	Sh	GB	Pen	PIM	FOW	FOA
2016	Atlanta Blaze	2	2	0	1	3	9	3	0	0	0	0	–	–	–	–	–	–	–	–	–	–	–
2016	Chesapeake Bayhawks	7	15	4	12	31	52	4	0	0	0	0	–	–	–	–	–	–	–	–	–	–	–
2017	Chesapeake Bayhawks	14	23	2	14	39	87	14	0	0	0	0	–	–	–	–	–	–	–	–	–	–	–
2018	Chesapeake Bayhawks	14	22	1	15	38	100	7	0	2	0	0	1	2	0	1	3	7	1	0	0	0	0
		37	62	7	42	111	248	28	0	2	0	0	1	2	0	1	3	7	1	0	0	0	0
Career total:		38	64	7	43	114	255	29	0	2	0	0											

GP–Games played; G–Goals; 2PG–2-point goals; A–Assists; Pts–Points; Sh–Shots; GB–Ground balls; Pen–Penalties; PIM–Penalty minutes; FOW–Faceoffs won; FOA–Faceoffs attempted

=== NLL ===
Myles Jones		Regular season									Playoffs								
Season	Team	GP	G	A	Pts	LB	PIM	Pts/GP	LB/GP	PIM/GP	GP	G	A	Pts	LB	PIM	Pts/GP	LB/GP	PIM/GP
2020	New York Riptide	5	0	0	0	21	0	0.00	4.20	0.00	–	–	–	–	–	–	–	–	–
		5	0	0	0	21	0	0.00	4.20	0.00	0	0	0	0	0	0	0.00	0.00	0.00
Career Total:		5	0	0	0	21	0	0.00	4.20	0.00									

GP–Games played; G–Goals; A–Assists; Pts–Points; LB–Loose balls; PIM–Penalty minutes; Pts/GP–Points per games played; LB/GP–Loose balls per games played; PIM/GP–Penalty minutes per games played.

=== NCAA ===
Season	Team	GP	G	A	Pts
2013	Duke	18	16	5	21
2014	Duke	20	37	26	63
2015	Duke	18	40	37	77
2016	Duke	19	33	37	70
College Totals		75	126	105	231

== Endorsements ==
On August 10, 2016, it was announced that Jones had signed a multi-year endorsement deal with Adidas.

Preceded by Tom Schreiber	McLaughlin Award; 2015	Succeeded by Incumbent
Preceded by Incumbent	McLaughlin Award; 2016	Succeeded by Trevor Baptiste
