= Danny Logan =

American lacrosse player

Personal information
- Nickname: Danny Lockdown
- Nationality: American
- Born: September 30, 1997 (age 28) Columbus, Ohio, U.S.
- Height: 5 ft 11 in (180 cm)
- Weight: 200 lb (91 kg; 14 st 4 lb)

Sport
- Position: Defensive midfielder (Field), Defense (box)
- Shoots: Right
- NCAA team: Denver (2021)
- NLL draft: 50th overall, 2020; San Diego Seals
- NLL team: San Diego Seals
- PLL team: Atlas LC
- Pro career: 2021–

Career highlights
- NCAA: 2x First Team All-Big East (2019, 2021); 1x First Team All-American (2021); 1x Third Team All-American (2020); 1x Honorable Mention All-American (2021); PLL: 1x PLL Champion (2025); 3x George Boiardi Hard Hat SSDM Award (2021, 2022, 2024); 4x First Team All-Pro (2021, 2022, 2024, 2025); 1x Second Team All-Pro (2023); 5x All-Star (2021-25); NLL: All-Rookie Team (2023)
Medal record
Representing United States
Men's lacrosse
World Lacrosse Championship
Winner	2023 San Diego
Men's box lacrosse
World Lacrosse Box Championships
Runner-up	2024 Utica

Danny Logan (born September 30, 1997) is an American professional lacrosse player who plays as a defensive midfielder for the New York Atlas of the Premier Lacrosse League (PLL) and as a defenseman for the San Diego Seals of the National Lacrosse League (NLL).

== Early life and career ==
Logan was born in Columbus, Ohio to Whitney and Karen Logan. He grew up in Upper Arlington, Ohio, where he attended Upper Arlington High School, earning four varsity letters in hockey and lacrosse. In lacrosse, he was a two-time All-American and state champion, and was named Ohio Player of the Year as a senior in 2016. His family was athletic, with both grandfathers and an uncle, Jeff Logan, having played football for Ohio State. His paternal grandfather, Dick Logan, played in the NFL for the Green Bay Packers. Another uncle, Jud Logan, represented the United States in the hammer throw at four Olympic Games, captaining the team in 1992.

== College career ==
Logan played five seasons at the University of Denver as a short stick defensive midfielder, also playing on the wing for faceoffs and sparingly playing offense. He spent five years with the Pioneers, graduating 8th all-time in school history in ground balls (186), and third in caused turnovers (50). He was a two-time First Team All-Big East member, and a First Team All-American in his final season. Logan graduated with a bachelor's degree in international business and finance, and a master's degree in applied qualitative finance.

Team	Season	GP	G	A	Pts	GB	CT	FOW	FOA
Denver	2017	17	7	2	9	39	3	5	9
Denver	2018	17	3	4	7	32	8	0	0
Denver	2019	15	5	3	8	54	16	0	0
Denver	2020	6	1	3	4	15	7	0	0
Denver	2021	17	4	5	9	46	16	0	0
Total		72	20	17	37	186	50	5	9

== Professional career ==
=== PLL ===
Logan was selected 11th overall in the 2021 PLL College Draft by Atlas Lacrosse Club. Selected 3rd in the 2nd round, he was the first Short Stick Defensive Midfield selected. He won the George Boiardi Hard Hat Award as the league's top defensive midfielder as a rookie and was voted #24 in the Players' Top 50 list after the season. He won the George Boiardi award again in 2022.

Logan signed a contract extension with Atlas through the 2027 season on March 1, 2025.

==== Stats ====
Season	Team	Regular season											Playoffs										
Season	Team	GP	G	2PG	A	Pts	Sh	GB	Pen	PIM	FOW	FOA	GP	G	2PG	A	Pts	Sh	GB	Pen	PIM	FOW	FOA
2021	Atlas LC	9	3	1	3	7	5	20	1	0.5	5	18	2	0	0	1	1	0	7	0	0	1	3
2022	Atlas LC	10	4	3	2	9	8	19	3	2	2	12	1	1	0	1	2	3	2	0	0	0	1
2023	Atlas LC	9	4	0	0	4	10	13	2	1	0	4	1	0	0	1	1	1	1	0	0	0	0
2025	New York Atlas	10	2	0	0	2	8	9	4	2.5	2	26	1	0	0	1	1	0	0	0	0	0	0
2025	New York Atlas	10	1	0	1	2	3	12	5	3	2	12	2	1	0	1	2	1	5	0	0	0	1
2026	New York Atlas	9	1	0	0	1	5	19	1	1	1	14	–	–	–	–	–	–	–	–	–	–	–
		57	15	4	6	25	39	92	16	10	12	86	7	2	0	5	7	5	15	0	0	1	5
Career total:		64	17	4	11	32	44	107	16	10	13	91											

GP–Games played; G–Goals; 2PG–2-point goals; A–Assists; Pts–Points; Sh–Shots; GB–Ground balls; Pen–Penalties; PIM–Penalty minutes; FOW–Faceoffs won; FOA–Faceoffs attempted

=== NLL ===
Logan was selected 50th overall by the San Diego Seals in the 2020 NLL Draft. Logan was named to the NLL All-Rookie Team following the 2023 season.

==== Stats ====
Danny Logan		Regular season									Playoffs								
Season	Team	GP	G	A	Pts	LB	PIM	Pts/GP	LB/GP	PIM/GP	GP	G	A	Pts	LB	PIM	Pts/GP	LB/GP	PIM/GP
2023	San Diego Seals	17	4	3	7	98	17	0.41	5.76	1.00	1	0	0	0	8	0	0.00	8.00	0.00
2024	San Diego Seals	10	3	5	8	46	2	0.80	4.60	0.20	3	0	2	2	9	2	0.67	3.00	0.67
2025	San Diego Seals	18	4	5	9	109	16	0.50	6.06	0.89	1	0	0	0	9	0	0.00	9.00	0.00
2026	San Diego Seals	17	1	3	4	108	20	0.24	6.35	1.18	1	0	0	0	4	2	0.00	4.00	2.00
		62	12	16	28	361	55	0.45	5.82	0.89	6	0	2	2	30	4	0.33	5.00	0.67
Career Total:		68	12	18	30	391	59	0.44	5.75	0.87									

GP–Games played; G–Goals; A–Assists; Pts–Points; LB–Loose balls; PIM–Penalty minutes; Pts/GP–Points per games played; LB/GP–Loose balls per games played; PIM/GP–Penalty minutes per games played.

== International career ==
Logan was named to the US national team for the 2023 World Lacrosse Championship.

== Playing style ==
Logan is generally regarded as the best short stick defensive midfielder in the world. He has been referred to as a "fifth pole" for his ability on defense, being able to shut down almost any opponent due to his combination of physicality and quickness, having many teams avoid dodging on him due to him allowing so few goals. Atlas head coach Mike Pressler has called Logan the greatest defensive midfielder he has ever seen. Due to this, he has been nicknamed "Danny Lockdown" by Denver, Atlas, and San Diego teammate Trevor Baptiste. Additionally, he plays the wing on faceoffs and is a threat to score in transition, with Atlas teammate Eric Law saying he believes Logan could be a PLL-caliber offensive midfielder. In box lacrosse, Logan also often takes faceoffs due to NLL teams not often carrying a faceoff specialist.
