= NBC Sports Gold =

Defunct sports program operated by NBC Sports Group

- Website type: Video on demand, OTT, Live streaming
- Available in: English
- Dissolved: Announced
- Predecessor: Tour de France Live
- Headquarters: United States
- Area served: Varies by package
- Owner: NBC Sports Group
- Services: Streaming service
- Website: www.peacocktv.com/sports
- Registration: Annual passes for various sports
- Launched: June 9, 2016
- Current status: Defunct as of December 31, 2021; 4.9 years ago

NBC Sports Gold was a suite of over-the-top subscription streaming television services operated by NBC Sports Group; the individual services (referred to as "passes") featured coverage of sports properties from NBC Sports, often as companions and overflow for content not shown on TV.

In 2020, NBC began to wind down the NBC Sports Gold services, with contracts for its content either expiring, or being migrated to NBCUniversal's subscription streaming service Peacock.

== Coverage history ==
=== Cycling ===
On June 9, 2016, it was announced that the "NBC Sports Tour de France Live" app would be relaunched as NBC Sports Gold ahead of the 2016 edition of the race. The rebranded service would also provide live, commercial free streaming coverage of several other cycling events for which NBC Sports was the rights holder including the Vuelta a España and Paris–Roubaix. The service was initially priced at $29.99 for a year-long pass.

A second season of the cycling pass was announced on June 6, 2017, with the addition of new events including the UCI Road World Championships, Colorado Classic, and Volta a Catalunya. The pass also included 30 hours of 2017 Tour de France coverage exclusive to the platform.

=== Rugby ===
In March 2017, a separate "Rugby Pass" was announced. This pass provides live coverage of every Premiership Rugby match. On October 5, 2017, NBC announced an agreement to air the Six Nations Rugby Championship. As part of the agreement, all 15 matches will be available as part of the NBC Sports Gold "Rugby Pass." In March 2018, NBC announced a rights agreement to air the European Rugby Champions Cup. Under the agreement, NBC Sports Gold will air all matches from the competition as part of its Rugby pass.

=== Track and field ===
The service was further expanded in April 2017 with a new "Track and Field Pass" which provided access to 25 track and field events including the Boston Marathon and Diamond League events.

=== Motocross ===
An additional "Pro Motocross Pass" was announced later that month providing access to every AMA Pro Motocross event. This was the first pass made available to users outside the United States. In 2021, all Motocross coverage, including exclusive qualifying, will be streamed live on Peacock Premium.

=== Soccer ===
In June 2017, NBC Sports announced "Premier League Pass." Priced at $50, the pass includes 130 exclusive live Premier League matches, a minimum of three per club, as well as match replays and original programming from NBC Sports and Premier League Productions. The matches had previously been available at no additional charge to subscribers of participating cable and satellite providers as part of NBC's now defunct "Premier League Extra Time" package. For the 2019–20 season, Premier League Pass was split into two tiers, with the cheaper "MatchDay Pass" offering streaming of Premier League matches not shown on TV, and the more expensive "Premier League Pass" adding same-day streaming of televised matches, as well as select Premier League studio programs from Sky Sports (such as Soccer Saturday and Goals on Sunday).

=== Football ===
In August 2017, NBC Sports Gold introduced "Notre Dame Football Season Pass." This was the first pass made available exclusively to customers outside the United States. Among the eligible countries were the United Kingdom, Canada, Germany, Spain, and Japan. The purchase price was announced as $49.99 for a full season or $9.99 per individual game.

=== Basketball ===
December 2017 saw a regional expansion to the platform with the addition of "Blazers Pass." Blazers Pass allows viewers in NBA-designated Portland Trail Blazers territory to access 15 Trail Blazers games without a subscription to NBC Sports Northwest. The first game aired as part of the package was the Trail Blazers December 11, 2017 game against the Golden State Warriors.

=== Motorsport ===
In April 2018, NBC announced NBC Sports Gold would begin offering "IndyCar Pass" in 2019, as part of a broader agreement to extend its existing cable rights to the series from NBCSN to include NBC. NBC Sports Gold aired practice and qualifying sessions, Carb Day at the Indianapolis 500, and Indy Lights races. In November 2019, the service introduced "TrackPass", which primarily included coverage of NASCAR's regional ARCA Menards Series East and ARCA Menards Series West series and selected practice and qualifying sessions for events, plus coverage of the IMSA and American Flat Track. The service succeeded FansChoice.tv, and was also divided into sub-packages (AFT, IMSA, and "NASCAR Roots") for individual components.

The service shut down in late 2021; NASCAR's regional package moved to FloRacing and American Flat Track moved to Fox Sports, while IMSA coverage moved to Peacock.

=== Skating ===
In May 2018, new passes for figure skating and speed skating were announced, in partnership with U.S. Figure Skating as part of an extension to its media rights.

=== Golf ===
On July 31, 2018, the PGA Tour announced that its PGA Tour Live service would move to "Golf Pass" on NBC Sports Gold under a three-year deal beginning in the 2019 season; this included featured groups coverage of early rounds prior to Golf Channel television coverage, featured holes coverage during Golf Channel's window, as well as other supplemental content.

=== Skiing and snowboarding ===
In October 2018, the "Snow Pass" was introduced, focusing on skiing and snowboard events (including International Ski Federation events).

== Passes ==
Former NBC Sports Gold Passes
Name	Sport	Year Debuted	Year Ended	Location Available
Premier League Pass	Premier League soccer	2017	2020	United States
Rugby Pass	Rugby union	2017	2020	United States
Figure Skating Pass	Figure skating	2018	2020	United States
Premier League MatchDay Pass	Soccer	2019	2020	United States
Snow Pass	Skiing and snowboarding	2018	2020	United States
Supercross Pass	Supercross	2019	2021	United States
Pro Motocross Pass	Motocross	2017	2021	United States
Track and Field Pass	Track and field	2017	2021	United States
Speed Skating Pass	Speed skating	2018	2021	United States
IndyCar Pass	Motorsport	2019	2021	United States
TrackPass	Motorsport	2020	2021	United States
Premier Lacrosse League Pass	Lacrosse	2019	2021	United States
America's Cup Pass	Sailing	2020	2020	United States
Cycling Pass	Cycling	2016	2021	United States
Notre Dame Football Season Pass	Football	2017	2021	Select international locations
Blazers Pass	NBC Sports Northwest Blazers games and studio programming	2017	2021	NBA designated Portland Trail Blazers Territory
Philly Pass	NBC Sports Philadelphia studio programming (pre-game/post-game)	2018	2021	United States
PGA Tour Live	Golf	2019	2021	United States
Premier Lacrosse League Pass	Lacrosse	2019	2021	Austria, Canada, Denmark, Germany, Ireland, Italy, Japan, Luxembourg, Netherlands, Spain, Sweden, and United Kingdom

== Criticism ==
The creation of "Premier League Pass" was met with disappointment in the soccer community, with prominent soccer website World Soccer Talk describing it as "a giant step backward." The website further noted that the move was particularly harmful to fans of league's smaller clubs. The package was also criticized for not going far enough with 250 Premier League matches remaining exclusive to cable. World Soccer Talk expressed renewed concern following the 2019 update to the offering, due to the removal of match replays for authenticated cable and satellite subscribers. The website also criticized the decision not to make the new Gold replays available until hours after match completion.

NBC Sports Gold suffered serious outages on September 23, 2017, during a set of matches which included Manchester United against Southampton. The matches were moved to the NBC Sports App amid complaints on social media. NBC apologized for the outage, and offered refunds or credit to those affected.
