= New York Atlas (lacrosse) =

Field lacrosse team in the PLL

- Full name: New York Atlas Lacrosse Club
- Nickname: Bulls
- Founded: 2019
- League: Premier Lacrosse League
- Based in: Albany, New York
- Stadium: Casey Stadium
- Colors
- Owner: Joe Nardella
- Head coach: Mike Pressler
- Championships: 1 (2025)
- Website: New York Atlas

The New York Atlas are a professional field lacrosse team based in Albany, New York, that competes in the Premier Lacrosse League (PLL).

== History ==
The Atlas LC was one of the six founding members of the PLL for the 2019 season. The inaugural roster was made up of several former Johns Hopkins players, most notably PLL co-founder, Paul Rabil, as well as Tucker Durkin, Ryan Brown, John Crawley, and Joel Tinney. The Atlas has an unofficial rivalry with the Whipsnakes as several of the Whipsnakes players are former Maryland Terrapins, a collegiate rivalry carrying over to the pros. The Bulls struggled in their first 2 seasons going 7-10. However, in 2021 and 2022 they were among the league's best with a combined record of 13-9. This success was largely due to the breakout of attackman Jeff Teat and the 2022 MVP campaign from Faceoff Athlete Trevor Baptiste. In 2023 it was announced that the Atlas LC would become the New York Atlas with the introduction of home cities for the 2024 season. The decision to place the Atlas identity in New York was attributed to iconography like the Wall Street Bull Statue and the tough, hard-nose nature of New York sports.

== Roster ==
2026 New York Atlas
| # | Name | Nationality | Position | Shot | Height | Weight | College | Grad year | High school | Hometown | Ref. |
| 1 | Connor Shellenberger | (United States) | Attack | Right | 6 ft 1 in | 195 lbs | Virginia | 2024 | St. Anne's-Belfield | Charlottesville, Virginia | |
| 2 | Matt Traynor | (United States) | Midfield | R/L | 6 ft 2 in | 193 lbs | Penn State | 2025 | Malvern Prep | Downingtown, Pennsylvania | |
| 3 | Vinny Butrico | (United States) | Attack | Left | 5 ft 9 in | 170 lbs | Wingate | 2026 | MacArthur | Levittown, New York | |
| 5 | Tyler Carpenter | (United States) | LSM | Left | 5 ft 10 in | 180 lbs | Duke | 2024 | Salisbury | Durham, North Carolina | |
| 7 | Jeff Teat (C) | (Canada) | Attack | Left | 5 ft 10 in | 180 lbs | Cornell | 2021 | The Hill Academy | Brampton, Ontario | |
| 8 | Levi Anderson | (Canada) | Midfield | Left | 6 ft 4 in | 220 lbs | Saint Joseph's | 2024 | Crescent Heights | Calgary, Alberta | |
| 9 | Trevor Baptiste (C) | (United States) | Faceoff | Right | 5 ft 10 in | 225 lbs | Denver | 2018 | Morristown–Beard | Denville, New Jersey | |
| 10 | Xander Dickson | (United States) | Attack | Right | 6 ft 1 in | 170 lbs | Virginia | 2023 | Brunswick | Greenwich, Connecticut | |
| 13 | Hunter Drouin | (United States) | Attack | Left | 5 ft 10 in | 180 lbs | Colgate | 2026 | Loomis Chaffee | Derry, New Hampshire | |
| 14 | Jake Stevens | (Canada) | Midfield | Right | 5 ft 9 in | 193 lbs | Syracuse | 2024 | Culver | Puslinch, Ontario | |
| 20 | Michael Grace | (Canada) | LSM | Left | 6 ft 5 in | 220 lbs | Syracuse | 2025 | Sherwood | Hamilton, Ontario | |
| 21 | Luke Rhoa | (United States) | Midfield | R/L | 6 ft 0 in | 180 lbs | Syracuse | 2026 | St John's College | Potomac, Maryland | |
| 22 | Michael Rexrode | (United States) | Defense | Right | 6 ft 1 in | 215 lbs | Rutgers | 2018 | Loudoun County | Leesburg, Virginia | |
| 25 | Eli Gobrecht | (United States) | Defense/SSDM | Right | 6 ft 0 in | 200 lbs | Ithaca | 2016 | Ithaca | Ithaca, New York | |
| 26 | Bryan Costabile | (United States) | Midfield | R/L | 6 ft 2 in | 230 lbs | Notre Dame | 2020 | Mount Saint Joseph | Sykesville, Maryland | |
| 27 | Hugh Kelleher | (United States) | Midfield | R/L | 6 ft 3 in | 220 lbs | Cornell | 2025 | MacArthur | Wantagh, New York | |
| 28 | Liam Kammar | (United States) | SSDM | Right | 6 ft 0 in | 205 lbs | Drexel | 2026 | Calvert Hall | Timonium, Maryland | |
| 41 | Jon Robbins | (United States) | LSM | Left | 5 ft 9 in | 190 lbs | Bellarmine | 2022 | Plano | Plano, Texas | |
| 43 | Brett Makar | (United States) | Defense | Right | 6 ft 1 in | 200 lbs | Maryland | 2023 | Yorktown Heights | Yorktown Heights, New York | |
| 44 | Liam Entenmann | (United States) | Goalie | Right | 6 ft 3 in | 203 lbs | Notre Dame | 2024 | Chaminade | Point Lookout, New York | |
| 48 | Max Krevsky | (Israel) | SSDM | Left | 6 ft 2 in | 200 lbs | Yale | 2025 | Cumberland Valley | Harrisburg, Pennsylvania | |
| 77 | Carson Billig | (United States) | SSDM | Left | 6 ft 0 in | 190 lbs | Michigan | 2026 | Brighton | Brighton, Michigan | |
| 81 | Nathan Laliberte | (United States) | Faceoff | Right | 5 ft 10 in | 215 lbs | Bryant | 2024 | Pinkerton Academy | Auburn, New Hampshire | |
| 88 | Will Mark | (United States) | Goalie | Right | 6 ft 4 in | 200 lbs | Syracuse | 2024 | Proctor Academy | Danville, California | |
| 91 | Danny Logan (C) | (United States) | SSDM | Right | 5 ft 11 in | 205 lbs | Denver | 2021 | Upper Arlington | Upper Arlington, Ohio | |
| 98 | Reid Bowering | (Canada) | Attack | Left | 6 ft 0 in | 205 lbs | Drexel | 2021 | Archbishop Carney | Coquitlam, British Columbia | |

*Indicates player is on the holdout list

**Indicates player is on the PUP list

^Indicates player is on the unavailable to travel list

(C): Captain

=== Coaching staff ===
- Head coach – Mike Pressler
- Assistant coaches – Kevin Cassese, Kyle Sweeney

== All-time Draft selections ==
=== 2019 College Draft ===
| Rnd. | Pick # | Player | Pos. | College | Conf. | 2019 Accolades |
|---|---|---|---|---|---|---|
| 1 | 2 | Ryan Conrad | Midfield | Virginia | Atlantic Coast Conference | First-Team All-American, First-Team ACC |
| 2 | 11 | Cade Van Raaphorst | Defense | Duke | Atlantic Coast Conference | First-Team All-American, First-Team ACC |
| 3 | 14 | Noah Richard | Midfield | Marquette | Big East Conference | Honorable Mention All-American, Big East Defensive Player of the Year, First-Team Big East |
| 4 | 23 | Brent Noseworthy | Midfield | Michigan | Big Ten Conference | 2018 Accolades (Injured most of 2019): Honorable Mention All-American, First-Team Big Ten |
| Undrafted | FA | Jacob Stover | Goalie | Loyola | Patriot League | First-Team All-American, First-Team Patriot League, Patriot League Goalie of the Year |

2020 Entry Draft

The 2020 player entry draft occurred on March 16 for teams to select players arriving from rival Major League Lacrosse. On March 4, Paul Burmeister and NBCSN hosted an entry draft lottery for selection order. Out of 100 balls to select from, Waterdogs had 40, Chrome had 25, Atlas had 15, Archers had 10, Chaos had 6, Redwoods had 3, and the champion Whipsnakes had 1.

Rob Pannell was announced to be transferring to the PLL on March 9, followed by 15 other players the following day, which comprised the selection pool for the entry draft. A total of 14 players were selected in the entry draft with remaining new players entering the league player pool.

Draft results
| Rnd. | Pick # | Player | Pos. | College |
|---|---|---|---|---|
| 1 | 3 | Rob Pannell | Attack | Cornell |
| 2 | 10 | Craig Chick | Defense | Lehigh |

=== 2020 College Draft ===
| Rnd. | Pick # | Player | Pos. | College |
|---|---|---|---|---|
| 1 | 2 | Bryan Costabile | Midfield | Notre Dame |
| 2 | 10 | Aidan Hynes | Defense | Yale |

2021 Entry Draft

| Rnd. | Pick # | Player | Pos. | College |
|---|---|---|---|---|
| 1 | 3 | Dan Bucaro | Attack | Georgetown |
| 2 | 9 | Michael Rexrode | Defense | Rutgers |
| 3 | 14 | Andrew Newbold | Defense | Sacred Heart |
| 4 | 22 | Brendan Sunday | Attack | Towson |

=== 2021 College Draft ===
| Rnd. | Pick # | Player | Pos. | College |
|---|---|---|---|---|
| 1 | 1 | Jeff Teat | Attack | Cornell |
| 1 | 8 | Dox Aitken | Midfield | Virginia |
| 2 | 10 | Jake Carraway | Midfield/Attack | Georgetown |
| 4 | 11 | Danny Logan | Defensive Midfield | Denver |
| 5 | 17 | Peter Dearth | Defensive Midfield | Syracuse |
| 6 | 26 | Gerard Arceri | Faceoff | Penn State |

=== 2022 College Draft ===
| Rnd. | Pick # | Player | Pos. | College |
|---|---|---|---|---|
| 1 | 2 | Chris Gray | Attack | North Carolina |
| 1 | 5 | Koby Smith | Long Stick Midfield | Towson |
| 2 | 13 | Brendan Curry | Midfield | Syracuse |
| 3 | 21 | Max Wayne | Defense | Christopher Newport |

=== 2023 College Draft ===
| Rnd. | Pick # | Player | Pos. | College |
|---|---|---|---|---|
| 1 | 1 | Gavin Adler | Defense | Cornell |
| 1 | 3 | Brett Makar | Defense | Maryland |
| 2 | 11 | Xander Dickson | Attack | Virginia |
| 3 | 19 | Payton Rezanka | Defensive Midfield | Loyola |
| 4 | 27 | Kyle Long | Attack | Maryland |

=== 2024 College Draft ===
| Rnd. | Pick # | Player | Pos. | College |
|---|---|---|---|---|
| 1 | 2 | Connor Shellenberger | Attack | Virginia |
| 1 | 5 | Liam Entenmann | Goalie | Notre Dame |
| 2 | 10 | Jake Stevens | Midfield | Syracuse |
| 4 | 26 | Tyler Carpenter | Defense | Duke |

=== 2025 College Draft ===
| Rnd. | Pick # | Player | Pos. | College |
|---|---|---|---|---|
| 1 | 6 | Matt Traynor | Midfield | Penn State |
| 2 | 14 | Max Krevsky | Midfield | Yale |
| 3 | 22 | Michael Grace | Long Stick Midfield | Syracuse |
| 4 | 30 | Hugh Kelleher | Midfield | Cornell |

=== 2026 College Draft ===
| Rnd. | Pick # | Player | Pos. | College |
|---|---|---|---|---|
| 1 | 8 | Alex Ross | Defense | Penn State |
| 2 | 16 | Luke Rhoa | Midfield | Syracuse |
| 3 | 24 | Nikko DiPonio | Defense | Utah |

== Season Results ==
2019
| Week | Location | Date | Opponent | Result |
|---|---|---|---|---|
| 1 | Boston, Massachusetts | June 2, 2019 | Redwoods | L 9–11 |
| 2 | New York, New York | June 8, 2019 | Chaos | L 13–18 |
| 3 | Chicago, Illinois | June 16, 2019 | Chrome | W 13–12 |
| 4 | Baltimore, Maryland | June 22, 2019 | Whipsnakes | L 10–15 |
| 5 | Atlanta, Georgia | June 28, 2019 | Archers | W 13–12 |
| 6 | Washington, DC | July 6, 2019 | Whipsnakes | L 9–11 |
| All-Star Break | Los Angeles, California | July 21, 2019 | Bye | Bye |
| 7 | Denver, Colorado | July 27, 2019 | Redwoods | W 18-15 |
| 8 | San Jose, California | August 11, 2019 | Archers | L 11–15 |
| 9 | Hamilton, Ontario | August 17, 2019 | Chrome | W 17-14 |
| 10 | Albany, New York | August 25, 2019 | Chaos | W 12-9 |
| Playoffs Round 1 | Columbus, Ohio | September 7, 2019 | Chrome | W 17-8 |
| First Draft Pick Game | Philadelphia, Pennsylvania | September 21, 2019 | Archers | L 25-7 |

2020
| Game | Location | Date | Opponent | Result |
|---|---|---|---|---|
| 1 | Herriman, Utah | July 26, 2020 | Waterdogs | W 11–10 |
| 2 | Herriman, Utah | July 27, 2020 | Archers | L 10–11 |
| 3 | Herriman, Utah | July 30, 2020 | Whipsnakes | L 6–15 |
| 4 | Herriman, Utah | August 1, 2020 | Redwoods | L 10–11 |
| 5 (Elimination) | Herriman, Utah | August 4, 2020 | Archers | L 9–11 |

2021
| Game | Location | Date | Opponent | Result |
|---|---|---|---|---|
| 1 | Foxborough, Massachusetts | June 5, 2021 | Archers | L 6–18 |
| 2 | Kennesaw, Georgia | June 12, 2021 | Redwoods | W 12–9 |
| 3 | Baltimore, Maryland | June 25, 2021 | Whipsnakes | L 11–12 |
| 4 | Baltimore, Maryland | June 27, 2021 | Cannons | W 18–17 |
| 5 | Hempstead, New York | July 4, 2021 | Chrome | W 16–10 |
| 6 | Eagan, Minnesota | July 10, 2021 | Chaos | W 16–10 |
| 7 | Colorado Springs, Colorado | July 30, 2021 | Chrome | W 19–10 |
| 8 | Colorado Springs, Colorado | August 1, 2021 | Cannons | W 13–12 |
| 9 | Albany, New York | August 14, 2021 | Waterdogs | L 9–10 |
| 10 (Quarterfinal) | Sandy, Utah | August 21, 2021 | Cannons | W 13–9 |
| 11 (Semifinal) | Chester, Pennsylvania | September 5, 2021 | Chaos | L 9–15 |

2022
| Game | Location | Date | Opponent | Result |
|---|---|---|---|---|
| 1 | Albany, New York | June 4, 2022 | Redwoods | W 17-11 |
| 2 | Charlotte, North Carolina | June 11, 2022 | Cannons | W 16-8 |
| 3 | Hempstead, Long Island (New York) | June 17, 2022 | Whipsnakes | L 8-12 |
| 4 | Baltimore, Maryland | June 25, 2022 | Archers | W 10-9 |
| 5 | Eagan, MN (Minneapolis) | July 1, 2022 | Chrome | W 14-13 |
| 6 | Fairfield, CT | July 23, 2022 | Redwoods | L 15-16 |
| 7 | Frisco, TX (Dallas) | July 30, 2022 | Archers | W 14-9 |
| 8 | Denver, CO | August 6, 2022 | Waterdogs | L 15-16 |
| 9 | Herriman, UT (Salt Lake City) | August 12, 2022 | Whipsnakes | L 8-16 |
| 10 | Tacoma, WA (Seattle) | August 21, 2022 | Chaos | W 10-9 |
| 11 (Quarterfinal) | Foxborough, MA (Boston) | September 3, 2022 | Waterdogs | L 14-19 |

2023 Championship Series
| Game | Location | Date | Opponent | Result |
|---|---|---|---|---|
| 1 | Springfield, VA | February 22, 2023 | Whipsnakes | W 29-16 |
| 2 | Springfield, VA | February 23, 2023 | Chrome | W 29-20 |
| 3 | Springfield, VA | February 24, 2023 | Archers | W 31-26 |
| 4 (Semifinals) | Springfield, VA | February 25, 2023 | Whipsnakes | W 30-21 |
| 5 (Championship) | Springfield, VA | February 26, 2023 | Chrome | L 23-24 |

2023
| Game | Location | Date | Opponent | Result |
|---|---|---|---|---|
| 1 | Albany, New York | June 3, 2023 | Redwoods | L 12-13 |
| 2 | Charlotte, North Carolina | June 11, 2023 | Whipsnakes | W 12-11 |
| 3 | Columbus, OH | June 16, 2023 | Waterdogs | L 18-19 |
| 4 | Eagan, MN (Minneapolis) | July 8, 2023 | Cannons | L 12-19 |
| 5 | Fairfield, CT | July 15, 2023 | Chaos | L 15-11 |
| 6 | Frisco, TX (Dallas) | July 29, 2023 | Chrome | W 11-9 |
| 7 | Baltimore, MD | August 5, 2023 | Archers | L 14-13 (OT) |
| 8 | Denver, CO | August 12, 2023 | Waterdogs | L 11-14 |
| 9 | Tacoma, WA (Seattle) | August 18, 2023 | Cannons | L 13-14 |
| 10 | Herriman, UT (Salt Lake City) | August 25, 2023 | Redwoods | L 7-12 |
| 11 (Quarterfinal) | Foxborough, MA (Boston) | September 4, 2023 | Cannons | L 11-20 |

2024
| Game | Location | Date | Opponent | Result |
|---|---|---|---|---|
| 1 | Albany, New York | June 1, 2024 | Boston | W 19-12 |
| 2 | Albany, New York | June 2, 2024 | Maryland | W 17-13 |
| 3 | Charlotte, NC | June 8, 2024 | Carolina | W 15-12 |
| 4 | Villanova, PA (Philadelphia) | June 16, 2024 | California | W 20-15 |
| 5 | Eagan, MN (Minneapolis) | June 28, 2024 | Maryland | L 12-16 |
| 6 | Cambridge, MA (Boston) | July 5, 2024 | Denver | W 17-4 |
| 7 | Fairfield, CT | July 20, 2024 | Boston | L 12-17 |
| 8 | San Diego, CA | July 28, 2024 | Waterdogs | W 12-11 |
| 9 | Denver, CO | August 10, 2024 | Utah | W 15-11 |
| 10 | Herriman, UT (Salt Lake City) | August 27, 2024 | Philadelphia | L 12-13 |
| 11 (Semifinal) | Long Island, NY | September 8, 2024 | Maryland | L 11-12 (OT) |

2025 Championship Series
| Game | Location | Date | Opponent | Result |
|---|---|---|---|---|
| 1 | Springfield, VA | February 11 | Whipsnakes | W 25-13 |
| 2 | Springfield, VA | February 14 | Archers | L 20-23 |
| 3 | Springfield, VA | February 15 | Cannons | L 15-23 |
| 4 (Semifinals) | Springfield, VA | February 16 | Cannons | L 23-24 (OT) |

== PLL Award Winners ==
Jim Brown Most Valuable Player

- Trevor Baptiste: 2022
- Jeff Teat: 2024
- Connor Shellenberger: 2025

Eamon McEneaney Attackman of the Year

- Jeff Teat: 2024
- Connor Shellenberger: 2025

Dave Pietramala Defensive Player of the Year

- Gavin Adler: 2025

Brodie Merrill Long Stick Midfielder of the Year

- Tyler Carpenter: 2024

Paul Cantabene Faceoff Athlete of the Year

- Trevor Baptiste: 2019, 2021, 2022, 2023, 2024

George Boiardi Short Stick Midfielder of the Year

- Danny Logan: 2021, 2022, 2024

Rookie of the Year

- Jeff Teat: 2021

Dick Edell Coach of the Year

- Mike Pressler: 2024

Dave Huntley Sportsmanship Award

- Eric Law: 2021, 2022
- Trevor Baptiste: 2026

Welles Crowther Humanitarian Award

- Eric Law: 2023

== Head coaches ==
| # | Name | Term | Regular season | | | | Playoffs | | | |
| # | Name | Term | GP | W | L | Pct | GP | W | L | Pct |
|---|---|---|---|---|---|---|---|---|---|---|
| 1 | John Paul | 2019 | 10 | 5 | 5 | .500 | 2 | 1 | 1 | .500 |
| 2 | Ben Rubeor | 2020 - 2022 | 23 | 13 | 10 | .565 | 4 | 1 | 3 | .250 |
| 3 | Mike Pressler | 2023 - | 20 | 9 | 11 | .450 | 2 | 0 | 2 | .000 |

== All-time record vs. PLL Clubs ==
| Opponent | Won | Lost | Percentage | Streak |
|---|---|---|---|---|
| Archers | 4 | 6 | .400 | Won 1 |
| Cannons | 5 | 3 | .625 | Won 1 |
| Chaos | 4 | 3 | .571 | Won 1 |
| Outlaws | 8 | 0 | 1.000 | Won 8 |
| Redwoods | 4 | 5 | .444 | Won 1 |
| Waterdogs | 2 | 6 | .250 | Lost 1 |
| Whipsnakes | 2 | 8 | .250 | Lost 2 |
| Totals | 29 | 31 | .483 | |
