= Premier Lacrosse League =

American professional field lacrosse league

- Current season, competition or edition: 2026 Premier Lacrosse League season
- Sport: Field lacrosse
- Founded: 2018
- Founder: Mike Rabil, Paul Rabil
- First season: 2019
- President: Paul Rabil
- No. of teams: 8
- Countries: United States
- Headquarters: El Segundo, California
- Most recent champions: Philadelphia Waterdogs (2nd title) (2026)
- Most titles: Maryland Whipsnakes; Utah Archers; Philadelphia Waterdogs (2 titles each)
- Broadcasters: ABC; ESPN; ESPN2; ESPN+ ESPN App
- Website: premierlacrosseleague.com

The Premier Lacrosse League (PLL) is a professional field lacrosse league in the United States. The league comprises eight teams based across the country. Its inaugural season debuted on June 1, 2019, and included a 14-week tour-based schedule taking place in 12 major-market cities. The league was founded by the American professional lacrosse player Paul Rabil and his brother Mike Rabil. Investors include the Chernin Group, the Raine Group and Joseph Tsai.

== History ==
In September 2018, Bloomberg reported that Paul Rabil would be launching a new professional lacrosse league. The PLL would be a direct competitor to the more established Major League Lacrosse. The new league would provide professional lacrosse players with salaries, health care, and league equity. By October 2018, 140 players had been signed by the PLL. Of the 140 players are 86 All-Americans, 25 members of the U.S. national team, and 10 former Tewaaraton Award winners. By December the league had signed 17 additional players. For the League's inaugural season, the PLL had the 6 founding teams draft a player in each of the 4 rounds. For the first round there was a random draw and the reverse the order every round. Archers had the first draft pick in the newly formed league, taking Pat Spencer making him the first player ever drafted in the PLL.

As opposed to tying teams to a specific market, the league's first season toured 12 different "major market cities". The season included 14 weeks, comprising 10 regular-season weekends, 1 all-star weekend, and 3 playoff weekends, running from June 1 through September 21, assuring there was no overlap with the NCAA Lacrosse season or the National Lacrosse League regular season. Paul Rabil first hinted at expansion in a post game interview after the 2019 Championship game and on January 1, 2020, the Premier Lacrosse League announced the Waterdogs Lacrosse Club's admission into the league. An expansion draft took place on February 12 and an entry draft occurred on March 16 to build the new roster with veteran players.

On December 16, 2020, it was announced that the PLL and MLL had merged under the banner of the PLL. The PLL would add the Boston Cannons for the 2021 season, rebranded as the Cannons Lacrosse Club, to bring the total PLL teams to eight. Small tweaks to the former Boston Cannons branding resulted in a PLL crest and logo reveal on January 12, 2021. In July 2022, Ticketmaster tracked a 38% growth in tickets purchased and attendance. The PLL also announced the approved Series D round of funding for the league which was being led by return investor The Chernin Group. Other investors include Blue Pool Capitol, Brett Jefferson, WWE, 35V, Kevin Durant, Rich Klieman, Arctos Partners, Wheelhouse Entertainment, and Pomp Investments.

On May 25, 2023 it was announced that the PLL would be assigning home cities to teams beginning with the 2024 season. Voting for the finalists began on June 3, 2023, and the 26 finalists were announced during the 2023 PLL All-Star game. The finalists were selected through a mix of fan-voting, customer data, ticketing performance, and venue availability. The PLL also announced that they would not be moving away from the touring model. Teams will continue to play on ten regular season weekends, two of which will be played at neutral sites, the other eight of which will be hosted by one of the teams. On the weekend a team hosts, they will play a doubleheader. On November 14, the home cities were announced for each of the 8 teams; Chrome Lacrosse Club was replaced by the Denver Outlaws. Rabil envisions the league's decision to affiliate teams with geographic areas as the 2nd of three potential phases in the PLL's expansion as it continues to capture the attention and viewership of casual fans. Rabil mentioned Phase 3 could become traditional home-and-away schedule like Major League Lacrosse, and the PLL owning venues in each of these markets.

In June 2025 it was announced that in ESPN would be granted an ownership stake in the league, reportedly 3%, in conjunction with a renewal of its media rights deal.

== Format and rules ==
The PLL regular season consists of 10 weekends where games are played. Halfway through the season there is an all-star break where the exhibition all-star game is played as well as other all-star skills challenges. The PLL utilizes a touring model and plays at a different location each weekend. Prior to the 2023 PLL season it was announced that the PLL would be assigning home cities to teams while still utilizing the touring model. Each team will host one weekend where they play a doubleheader. The remaining two weekends will be played at a neutral site. The PLL postseason consists of a 6-team single elimination tournament, where the top three teams from each conference make the playoffs. The top seed in each conference receives a bye into the semifinals. Both quarterfinals games are played on the same day at the same location. The same is true for the semifinals.

The PLL has a variety of major rule differences compared to traditional field lacrosse:

- A PLL field is shorter by 10 yards compared to traditional field lacrosse. Traditional field lacrosse is played on a 110-yard field with 80 yards separating the two goals, in the PLL the field is 100 yards with 70 yards separating the two goals. The field width is 60 yards.
- In the PLL a two-point goal can be scored outside of the two-point arc. The arc is 15 yards at the top-center, top-left, and top-right portions, and is 13-yards at the corners; it also serves as the restraining area on face-offs.
- There is a 52-second shot clock on possessions gained from defensive stops and other turnovers. When there is a shot and the offense retains possession the shot clock is 32 seconds. The shot-clock is 32 seconds on possessions gained from winning the face-off.

== Teams ==
As of the 2024 season, eight clubs with rosters of 25 players each compete in the Premier Lacrosse League, divided equally into two conferences. The Eastern Conference consists of the Boston Cannons, Maryland Whipsnakes, New York Atlas and Philadelphia Waterdogs, while the Western Conference consists of the California Redwoods, Carolina Chaos, Denver Outlaws and Utah Archers. Six of the current teams have competed in the league continuously since the inaugural 2019 season. The Waterdogs were admitted as an expansion team in the 2020 season, while the Cannons moved from Major League Lacrosse (MLL) and began play in the 2021 season. The Cannons were the only MLL club to survive the MLL–PLL merger, though the Outlaws, originally founded as the Chrome Lacrosse Club, adopted the identity of the MLL's Denver Outlaws. The Maryland Whipsnakes are the most successful franchise, having won two championships and finished runners-up twice. The Archers have also won two championships, while the Chaos and Waterdogs have each won one championship. The Redwoods finished runners-up once, while the Cannons have yet appeared in a PLL Championship game.

A college draft is held prior to the season each year, in addition to expansion drafts when necessary. The college draft order is determined via regular season standings with the team that was in last place the previous season receiving the number one overall pick. As of 2023, each PLL team has a salary cap of $735,000 which they must allocate at least 98% of each year, The minimum salary for each player is $25,000, this leaves around $100,000 to be allocated by each team over the minimum. The average PLL salary has been estimated at $28,000, although the league itself does not release the number. All players selected in the PLL college draft are given three-year contracts, all but the top-four selections are given $25,000. The first overall pick receives $30,000, second overall receives $28,500, third overall receives $27,500, and fourth overall receives $26,000. Prior to the beginning of the season the PLL hosts a "training-camp" where each team begins with a 30-man roster. By the end of training camp each team is required to have a 25-man roster. Training camp consists of individual and multi-team practices, as well as scrimmages between the teams.

The first free agency period for the PLL took place prior to the 2023 PLL season from March 6, 2023 to April 1, 2023. Following the PLL season, players are given the opportunity to opt out of their current contract if they were on the active roster (21-man roster) for less than 30% of games the previous season. If that player does not sign with another club by the end of the free agency period, they return to their original team. If a player has not appeared on a team's 21-man active roster for three consecutive weeks the player was eligible to play, the player may be claimed by any team. When a player is released by their club, they enter the player pool; other teams will have one week to claim the player before the player enters free agency.

Overview of Premier Lacrosse League teams
Conf.	Team	Location	Stadium	Seats (Note: Standard reduced capacity; can be increased)	Joined	Championships
Eastern	Boston Cannons	Boston, MA	Harvard Stadium	25,000	2021	0
Eastern	Maryland Whipsnakes	Baltimore, MD	Awalt Field	6,000	2019	2 (2019, 2020)
Eastern	New York Atlas	Hempstead, NY	Shuart Stadium	11,929	2019	1 (2025)
Eastern	Philadelphia Waterdogs	Chester, PA	Subaru Park	18,500	2020	2 (2022), 2026)
Western	California Redwoods	San Diego, CA	Torero Stadium	6,000	2019	0
Western	Carolina Chaos	Charlotte, NC	American Legion Memorial Stadium	10,500	2019	1 (2021)
Western	Denver Outlaws	Denver, CO	Peter Barton Stadium	3,117	2019	0
Western	Utah Archers	Herriman, UT	Zions Bank Stadium	5,000	2019	2 (2023, 2024)

Timeline

== Venues ==
The league uses a touring model only spending a week in each city. In 2020, the entire original schedule was scrapped due to the COVID-19 pandemic, the season was then restructured to have every game take place at Zions Bank Stadium in Herriman, Utah. In 2024 the touring model was adapted, with each team being assigned a home city which hosted a week of the tour.

2019–2026 Premier Lacrosse League touring venues
Stadium	Games held	Seasons used	Capacity	Opened	City
Zions Bank Stadium	36	2020, 2022, 2023, 2024, 2025	5,000	2018	Herriman, UT
Tom & Mary Casey Stadium	25	2019, ~~2020~~, 2021, 2022, 2023, 2024, 2025	8,500	2013	Albany, NY
Homewood Field	24	2019, ~~2020~~, 2021, 2022, 2023, 2024, 2025	8,500	1906	Baltimore, MD
TCO Stadium	18	~~2020~~, 2021, 2022, 2023, 2024, 2025	6,000	2018	Eagan, MN
Peter Barton Stadium	16	~~2020~~, 2022, 2023, 2024, 2025	2,000	2005	Denver, CO
Rafferty Stadium	16	2022, 2023, 2024, 2025, 2026	3,500	2014	Fairfield, CT
American Legion Memorial Stadium	13	2022, 2023, 2024, 2025	10,500	1936	Charlotte, NC
Gillette Stadium	12	2019, ~~2020~~, 2021, 2022, 2023	65,878	2002	Foxborough, MA
Shuart Stadium	11	2021, 2022, 2023	11,929	1963	Hempstead, NY
Ford Center at The Star	8	~~2020~~, 2022, 2023	12,000	2016	Frisco, TX
Harvard Stadium	8	2024, 2025	25,000	1903	Boston, MA
Torero Stadium	8	2024, 2025	6,000	1961	San Diego, CA
Villanova Stadium	8	2024, 2025	12,500	1927	Villanova, PA
Audi Field	6	2019, 2021, 2022	20,000	2018	Washington, DC
Sports Illustrated Stadium	6	2019, 2025	25,000	2010	Harrison, NJ
Subaru Park	6	2019, 2021, 2022, 2023, 2025	18,500	2010	Chester, PA
Fifth Third Bank Stadium	5	~~2020~~, 2021	8,318	2010	Kennesaw, GA
Pay Pal Park	5	2019, 2021	18,000	2015	San Jose, CA
Weidner Field	5	2021	8,000	2021	Colorado Springs, CO
Tacoma Dome	4	2022	21,000	1983	Tacoma, WA
OSU Lacrosse Stadium	4	2023	2,500	2023	Columbus, OH
Cheney Stadium	4	2023	6,500	1960	Tacoma, WA
Lanny and Sharon Martin Stadium	4	2025	12,032	1997	Evanston, IL
SeatGeek Stadium	3	2019	20,000	2006	Bridgeview, IL
Georgia State Stadium	3	2019	24,333	2017	Atlanta, GA
Dick's Sporting Goods Park	3	2019	18,061	2007	Commerce City, CO
Tim Hortons Field	3	2019	22,218	2014	Hamilton, ON
Mapfre Stadium	3	2019	19,968	1999	Columbus, OH
Rio Tinto Stadium	3	~~2020~~, 2021	20,213	2008	Sandy, UT
Dr. Mark & Cindy Lynn Stadium	2	2023, 2024	5,300	2014	Louisville, KY
Banc of California Stadium	1	2019	22,000	2018	Los Angeles, CA
CPKC Stadium	1	2025	11,500	2024	Kansas City, MO
Kenneth P. LaValle Stadium	0	~~2020~~	12,300	2002	Stony Brook, NY
Orange County Great Park	0	~~2020~~	5,500	2007	Irvine, CA
Providence Park	0	~~2020~~	25,218	1926	Portland, OR
WakeMed Soccer Park	0	~~2020~~	10,000	2002	Cary, NC

== Seasons ==
Season	Championship game			Regular season; leaders
Season	Champions	Score	Runner-up	Regular season; leaders
2019	Whipsnakes	12–11 (OT)	Redwoods	Chaos
2020	Whipsnakes	12–6	Chaos	Whipsnakes
2021	Chaos	14–9	Whipsnakes	Waterdogs
2022	Waterdogs	11–9	Chaos	Whipsnakes
2023	Archers	15–14	Waterdogs	Archers
2024	Archers	12–8	Whipsnakes	Atlas
2025	Atlas	14–13	Outlaws	Outlaws
2026	Waterdogs	14–4	Outlaws	Waterdogs

== Accolades ==
On February 15, 2022, the Premier Lacrosse League announced the inaugural class of the Professional Lacrosse Hall of Fame. In order to be eligible for selection, a player must:

- Be retired from professional play for at least three years
- Have played five seasons in MLL/PLL
- Be nominated by a member of the Hall of Fame committee and receive a 75 percent majority vote

Up until the creation of the Professional Lacrosse Hall of Fame there was no Hall of Fame for exclusively professional field lacrosse players. In February, 2023 Ryan Boyle was announced as the first member of the 2023 class. The remainder of the 2023 class was announced on March 23, 2023.

== Marketing ==
The league's media model radically differs from that of most North American professional sports leagues. A 2018 Sports Illustrated story on the then-prospective league pointed out that LeBron James' Instagram account "features virtually no clips of him playing basketball—those are the property of the NBA, meaning its owners." By contrast, the PLL open-sources its highlights, allowing players to freely use them to build their own personal brands. Additionally, PLL operates a full-time studio that produces other player-centered content.

== Broadcasting and sponsorship ==
Matches broadcast on U.S. television
Season	NBC	NBCSN	ABC	ESPN	ESPN2	Total
2019	3	16				19/38
2020	4	13				17/20
2021	4	17				21/42
2022			3	3	6	12/47
2023			8	2	6	16/47
2024			8	3	6	17/47

The Premier Lacrosse League was broadcast by NBCUniversal between 2019 and 2021, with select matches, including the All-Star Game and playoffs, airing on their NBC and NBCSN television networks. All matches were streamed on NBC Sports Gold, and later Peacock. Paul Burmeister served as the host during gameday broadcasts, while commentary was provided by Ryan Boyle and Brendan Burke. NBCUniversal's broadcasts made use of skycams, shot speed sensors provided by SMT, and microphones that facilitated conversations between players and the commentary team during matches. From 2022 to 2025, the league is broadcast by The Walt Disney Company, with select games airing on their ABC, ESPN, and ESPN2 television networks, and all games streaming on ESPN+.

Champion manufactures jerseys and footwear for the league's teams, while Cascade Lacrosse provides helmets and STX provides additional equipment. The league's primary ticket outlet is Ticketmaster, who also hold the league's naming rights as the Premier Lacrosse League Powered by Ticketmaster. Vail Health's Howard Head Sports Medicine provides physical therapy services to athletes, while The Steadman Clinic provides healthcare and orthopedic services. In addition, Gatorade, Progressive, the Athletic Brewing Company, VukGripz, Cash App, Charlotte's Web, and Lexus have sponsored the league.

== Sixes tournament ==
On December 12, 2022, the PLL announced a new mini event, the 2023 Championship Series, which took place in late February 2023 at The St. James indoor stadium in Springfield, Virginia. The 2023 Championship Series featured the top four teams from the 2022 season. Those being: Whipsnakes LC, Chrome LC, Archers LC, and Atlas LC. They played with 12-man rosters (10 position players and 2 goalies) using modified lacrosse sixes rules. Each team played three round-robin games from Wednesday, February 22 through Friday, February 24 to determine seeding for the semifinals on Saturday, February 25. The winners advanced to the PLL Championship Series game on Sunday, February 26. The games were broadcast on ESPN2 and streaming on ESPN+ with the Championship game on ESPNU. The PLL Championship Series champions were Chrome LC who defeated the Atlas LC in the final 24–23. Atlas midfielder Romar Dennis won the Golden Stick Award.

In November 2023, it was announced that the PLL would host another championship series in February 2024 also at The St. James indoor stadium in Springfield, Virginia.
