= 2010 NCAA Division I men's lacrosse tournament =

- Dates: May 15–31, 2010
- Teams: 16
- Finals site: M&T Bank Stadium, Baltimore, Maryland
- Champions: Duke (1st title)
- Runner-up: Notre Dame (1st title game)
- Semifinalists: Cornell (12th Final Four); Virginia (21st Final Four)
- Winning coach: John Danowski (1st title)
- MOP: Scott Rodgers, Notre Dame
- Attendance: 44,389 semi-finals 37,126 finals 81,515 total
- Top scorer: Ned Crotty, Duke (18 goals)

The 2010 NCAA Division I lacrosse tournament was the 40th annual tournament hosted by the National Collegiate Athletic Association to determine the team champion of men's college lacrosse among its Division I programs, held at the end of the 2010 NCAA Division I men's lacrosse season. The tournament was held from May 15–31, 2010.

Duke defeated Notre Dame Fighting in the final, 6–5 in overtime, capturing the Blue Devil's first men's lacrosse championship.

The championship game was played at M&T Bank Stadium, the home of the NFL's Baltimore Ravens, in Baltimore, Maryland, with a crowd of 37,126 fans.

== Venues ==
Baltimore, Maryland was selected as the host for the final and semifinals, which were held at M&T Bank Stadium, the home field of the Baltimore Ravens of the National Football League. The tournament was co-hosted by the University of Maryland, Baltimore County, Johns Hopkins University, Loyola University Maryland, and Towson University. Stony Brook University in Stony Brook, New York and Princeton University in Princeton, New Jersey hosted the quarterfinals.

In order to host the event, Baltimore competed against Boston; Denver; Columbus, Ohio; and East Rutherford, New Jersey. Baltimore promoted its strong lacrosse heritage and M&T Bank Stadium's close proximity to a wide range of hotels, restaurants, and shopping centers.

== Qualifying ==
Sixteen teams were selected to compete in the tournament based upon their performance during the regular season, and for some, a conference tournament.

The championship teams of six conferences were granted automatic tournament berths. Five of those were based upon the results of conference tournaments. The Eastern College Athletic Conference (ECAC) did not hold a conference tournament and granted its automatic qualifier to regular season champions Denver. Conference tournament champions that automatically qualified were: Army of the Patriot League, Delaware of the Colonial Athletic Association (CAA), Mount Saint Mary's of the Metro Atlantic Athletic Conference (MAAC), Princeton of the Ivy League, and Stony Brook of the America East Conference.

The selection committee granted the other ten tournament teams at-large berths. All four Atlantic Coast Conference (ACC) teams received at-large bids for the fourth straight year: Virginia, Maryland, North Carolina, and Duke. Two berths were filled by the Big East Conference: Syracuse and Notre Dame. Ivy League runners-up Cornell, independent Johns Hopkins, Loyola of the ECAC, and Hofstra of the CAA were also selected.

Notable teams considered to be "on the bubble" for selection, but not chosen, included Georgetown and Villanova of the Big East, Yale and Brown of the Ivy League, Drexel and UMass of the CAA. The selection of some at-large teams such as Notre Dame and Johns Hopkins instead of Georgetown, which missed the tournament for the third straight season, was considered a questionable snub by some analysts.

== Bracket ==
First Round; May 15–16
1 | Virginia | 18
Mount St. Mary's | 4
8 | Stony Brook | 9
Denver | 7
5 | Duke | 18
Johns Hopkins | 5
4 | North Carolina | 14
Delaware | 13
3 | Maryland | 11
Hofstra | 8
6 | Princeton | 5
Notre Dame | 8
7 | Cornell | 11‡
Loyola | 10
2 | Syracuse | 8
Army | 9†

Quarterfinals; May 22–23
1 | Virginia | 10
8 | Stony Brook | 9
5 | Duke | 17
4 | North Carolina | 9
3 | Maryland | 5
Notre Dame | 7
7 | Cornell | 14
Army | 5

Semifinals; May 29
1 | Virginia | 13
5 | Duke | 14
Notre Dame | 12
7 | Cornell | 7

Final; May 31
5 | Duke | 6*
Notre Dame | 5

- * = Overtime
- † = Double Overtime
- ‡ = Triple Overtime

== Game summaries ==
=== First round ===
The biggest surprise of the first round was Army's double-overtime upset of No. 2 seed Syracuse at the Carrier Dome. Some analysts ranked it among the greatest upsets in the history of the tournament. It was Army's first tournament win since 1993 and just the second home playoff loss for Syracuse since the tournament's inception; the other occurred in the 1991 semifinals.

=== Quarterfinals ===
Notre Dame pulled off a second straight upset over No. 3 Maryland 7–5 after ousting No. 6 Princeton in the first round. The Irish qualified for the semifinals for only the second time in school history. Their only other appearance came in 2001. Duke ran away with a 17–9 win over rival North Carolina after a 6-goal spurt in the second half. It marks the fourth consecutive semifinal appearance for the Blue Devils and third NCAA quarterfinal victory over North Carolina in the last four years. Cornell quickly put an end to Army's hopes of another upset, racing out to a 4–0 lead in an eventual 14–5 victory. With the victory, the Big Red advanced to the Final Four for the second consecutive year.

=== Semifinals ===
==== Notre Dame vs. Cornell ====
| | 1 | 2 | 3 | 4 | Total |
|---|---|---|---|---|---|
| Notre Dame | 3 | 3 | 2 | 4 | 12 |
| Cornell | 1 | 2 | 2 | 2 | 7 |

In the first semifinal, Notre Dame once again used its stifling defense led by goalie Scott Rodgers to beat a third straight seeded opponent in No. 7 Cornell. The Irish led 6–3 at half time but two straight goals in the third quarter pulled Cornell to within two at 7–5. It was as close as the Big Red would get, however, as the Irish finished with a flurry to win 12–7. The win marked the first time that an unseeded team had reached the championship game since UMass in 2006. It also marked the first time in school history that Notre Dame advanced to the title game.

==== Duke vs. Virginia ====
| | 1 | 2 | 3 | 4 | Total |
|---|---|---|---|---|---|
| Duke | 2 | 3 | 4 | 5 | 14 |
| Virginia | 4 | 3 | 1 | 5 | 13 |

In the second semifinal, No. 5 Duke upset No. 1 Virginia. After leading 7–5 at halftime, Virginia scored first in the second half to take an 8–5 lead, but Duke responded with a seven-goal blitz that made it 12–8 in favor of the Blue Devils early in the fourth quarter. Virginia would not go quietly, however, as the Cavaliers tied the game at 13 with just over a minute to play. With just 12 seconds left, Duke scored with the familiar combination of Ned Crotty to Max Quinzani to send Duke to its third championship game in six years.

=== Championship ===
==== Notre Dame vs. Duke ====
| | 1 | 2 | 3 | 4 | OT | Total |
|---|---|---|---|---|---|---|
| Notre Dame | 2 | 0 | 2 | 1 | 0 | 5 |
| Duke | 2 | 1 | 1 | 1 | 1 | 6 |

The championship game featured two schools who had never won a national title before, the first time that had happened since 1973. This guaranteed that a first-time Division I lacrosse champion would be crowned, something that had not happened since Princeton in 1992. The game proved to be one of the closest championship contests ever, albeit the lowest scoring one as well. Neither team ever led by more than a single goal throughout the contest. After trailing 3–2 at halftime, Notre Dame took its first lead since the first minute of the game early in the fourth quarter. Duke tied the game a few minutes later, though, and had a chance to win in the final seconds of regulation, but stellar defense by Notre Dame and timely saves by tournament MVP Scott Rodgers sent the game to overtime. The slow pace of regulation did not continue into overtime, as Duke Sophomore CJ Costabile, a long stick midfielder, won the opening faceoff cleanly and sprinted straight downfield to score just 5 seconds into the extra period. The goal set the record for the fastest to end an overtime in NCAA championship history, and gave Duke its first national title in school history.

== Post-tournament honors ==
After the championship, Duke attackman Ned Crotty was honored with the Tewaaraton Trophy for the most outstanding Division I men's lacrosse player. The NCAA announced the All-Tournament team after the championship. Scott Rodgers, goalie for runner-up Notre Dame, was named the Most Outstanding Player of the tournament, the first time a player from the losing team had won the honor since 1996. The full team included four players from champion Duke, three from runner-up Notre Dame, two from semifinalist Virginia, and one from semifinalist Cornell. The following individuals were named to that team:

| Player | Position | School | Class |
|---|---|---|---|
| Zach Howell | Attackman | Duke | Junior |
| Max Quinzani | Attackman | Duke | Senior |
| Chris Bocklet | Attackman | Virginia | Sophomore |
| Steele Stanwick | Attackman | Virginia | Sophomore |
| Steve Mock | Attackman | Cornell | Freshman |
| Zach Brenneman | Midfielder | Notre Dame | Junior |
| CJ Costabile | Long Stick Midfielder | Duke | Sophomore |
| Mike Manley | Defense | Duke | Junior |
| Kevin Ridgway | Defense | Notre Dame | Junior |
| Scott Rodgers | Goalie | Notre Dame | Senior |

== See also ==
- 2010 NCAA Division I women's lacrosse tournament
- 2010 NCAA Division II men's lacrosse tournament
- 2010 NCAA Division III men's lacrosse tournament
