= Syracuse–Virginia lacrosse rivalry =

College sports rivalry

- Virginia Cavaliers Syracuse Orange
- First meeting: April 14, 1938; Syracuse 13–4
- Latest meeting: April 11, 2026; Syracuse, 14-9

Statistics
- Total meetings: 44
- All-time series: Syracuse, 23–21
- Largest victory: Syracuse, 20–10 (2021)
- Longest win streak: Virginia, 5 (2005–2008)
- Current win streak: Syracuse, 3 (2024–present)

The Syracuse–Virginia lacrosse rivalry is an intercollegiate lacrosse rivalry between the Syracuse Orange and the Virginia Cavaliers. The teams first met in 1938 and have met 43 times. Syracuse leads the series 22–21 through 2025, but Virginia leads NCAA Tournament play 7–3. This rivalry is considered especially fierce because of its extremely even-matched nature, and its historic tendency to occur in key NCAA Tournament matches. Its intensity has been further heightened in the 21st century due to Syracuse joining Virginia in the Atlantic Coast Conference in 2013, and is now considered one of the most monumental matchups in the sport year after year. Unique to this rivalry in the ACC is that it has its primary roots in lacrosse itself, and isn't a carryover from other sports.

These rivals have met in the Final Four or Championship Game of the NCAA Tournament on six occasions, with Virginia winning four. They decided the last NCAA Championship of the 1900s, with Virginia defeating Syracuse, 12–10, in 1999. In their Final Four matches, Virginia defeated Syracuse in 1986, in 1994, and in 2006; while Syracuse defeated Virginia in 1995 and in 2008.

This rivalry game has been an annual fixture of the regular season since 1995, nearly two decades before the teams played in the same conference. The exception was 2020 when the game was cancelled due to COVID-19. Their rivalry game then occurred twice in the 2021 regular season for the first time. Syracuse swept both regular season matchups in that year, including the most lopsided victory in the history of the rivalry. Ironically, it was Virginia that would then go on to win its seventh (and second consecutive) NCAA Championship in that year.

With 17 NCAA Championships between them, Syracuse and Virginia rank first and third all-time for NCAA titles in the sport.

== Orange and blue ==
An odd facet to this rivalry is that the two schools share the exact same school colors: orange and blue. Virginia declared the orange-and-blue combination to be its unique colors—previously unused by any other university's sports teams— in 1888, some 79 years before Syracuse (having faced Virginia twice to that point in lacrosse but never in football or basketball) adopted the same combination in 1967. Between 1890 and 1966, Syracuse previously used orange as its sole school color, complemented only by white, an apparent reference to the Netherlands' House of Orange-Nassau which had originally colonized New York during the Dutch Republic. Virginia and Syracuse are the only Division I men's lacrosse programs to sport these colors; the founder of Auburn University's athletics programs, a Virginia graduate named George Petrie, adopted the orange-and-blue of his alma mater for that school as well, but Auburn only has a team that only competes in the Men's Collegiate Lacrosse Association. After Virginia (and Auburn, by extension) but before Syracuse, several other prominent college and professional (but non-lacrosse) teams began also using orange-and-blue as their team colors, including the Florida Gators (1906) and New York Knicks (1946).

== Rival accomplishments ==
Team	Syracuse Orange	Virginia Cavaliers
NCAA National Titles	10†	7
Pre-NCAA National Titles	5	2
NCAA Final Four Appearances	26†	24
NCAA Tournament Appearances	38†	40
NCAA Tournament Record	64–28†	55–33
NCAA Tournament Winning Percentage	.696†	.625
Conference Tournament Titles	4	7
Conference Championships	5	25
Tewaarton Award Recipients	3	3
Lt. Raymond Enners Award Recipients	7	4
Consensus First Team All-Americans	100	70
All-time Program Record	920–358–16†	675–376–6
All-time Winning Percentage	.717†	.641

†Syracuse was forced to forfeit its 1990 NCAA Tournament record and Championship due to a rules violation, and these records do not reflect the forfeited games.

== Game results ==
Syracuse victories	Virginia victories	Tie games

No.	Date	Location	Winner	Score
1	Apr 14, 1938	Charlottesville, VA	Syracuse	13–4
2	Apr 11, 1950	Charlottesville, VA	Virginia	13–7
3	May 24, 1986	Newark, DE	#3 Virginia	12–10
4	May 28, 1994	College Park, MD	#5 Virginia	15–14^{OT}
5	Mar 14, 1995	Syracuse, NY	#3 Virginia	15–7
6	May 27, 1995	College Park, MD	#3 Syracuse	20–13
7	Mar 2, 1996	Charlottesville, VA	#1 Virginia	17–15
8	Feb 28, 1997	Syracuse, NY	#2 Syracuse	22–21
9	Feb 28, 1998	Charlottesville, VA	#2 Syracuse	18–17
10	May 16, 1998	Hempstead, NY	#3 Syracuse	17–14
11	Mar 6, 1999	Syracuse, NY	#2 Syracuse	14–12
12	May 31, 1999	College Park, MD	#3 Virginia	12–10
13	May 4, 2000	Charlottesville, VA	#1 Syracuse	13–12^{OT}
14	Mar 3, 2001	Syracuse, NY	#1 Syracuse	13–7
15	Mar 2, 2002	Charlottesville, VA	#1 Syracuse	15–13
16	May 25, 2002	Piscataway, NJ	#2 Syracuse	12–11 ^{2OT}
17	Mar 1, 2003	Syracuse, NY	#2 Virginia	16–15
18	Mar 6, 2004	Charlottesville, VA	#3 Syracuse	18–12
19	Mar 5, 2005	Syracuse, NY	#3 Virginia	12–11
20	Mar 4, 2006	Charlottesville, VA	#2 Virginia	20–15
21	May 27, 2006	Philadelphia, PA	#1 Virginia	17–10
22	Mar 3, 2007	Baltimore, MD	#7 Virginia	11–8
23	Mar 1, 2008	Baltimore, MD	#3 Virginia	14–13

No.	Date	Location	Winner	Score
24	May 24, 2008	Foxboro, MA	#3 Syracuse	12–11^{OT}
25	Feb 27, 2009	Syracuse, NY	#2 Virginia	13–12
26	Mar 7, 2010	Charlottesville, VA	#2 Virginia	11–10
27	Mar 4, 2011	Syracuse, NY	#1 Syracuse	12–10
28	Mar 4, 2012	Charlottesville, VA	#1 Virginia	14–10
29	Mar 1, 2013	Syracuse, NY	#18 Syracuse	9–8^{OT}
30	Mar 1, 2014	Charlottesville, VA	#4 Virginia	17–12
31	Mar 1, 2015	Syracuse, NY	#2 Syracuse	15–9
32	Mar 4, 2016	Charlottesville, VA	#3 Syracuse	14–13
33	Mar 5, 2017	Syracuse, NY	#12 Syracuse	14–13
34	Mar 4, 2018	Charlottesville, VA	#12 Syracuse	12–11
35	Apr 27, 2018	Charlottesville, VA	#11 Virginia	11–10
36	Mar 2, 2019	Syracuse, NY	#10 Virginia	15–14^{OT}
37	Feb 27, 2021	Syracuse, NY	#10 Syracuse	20–10
38	Apr 24, 2021	Charlottesville, VA	#11 Syracuse	13–11
39	Feb 26, 2022	Charlottesville, VA	#2 Virginia	20–11
40	Apr 23, 2022	Syracuse, NY	#2 Virginia	21–15
41	Apr 22, 2023	Charlottesville, VA	#3 Virginia	19–12
42	Apr 20, 2024	Syracuse, NY	#7 Syracuse	18–17
43	Mar 29, 2025	Charlottesville, VA	#8 Syracuse	12–10
44	Apr 11, 2026	Syracuse, NY	#5 Syracuse	14–9
Series: Syracuse leads 23–21
