= Maryland–Virginia lacrosse rivalry =

College sports rivalry

- Maryland Terrapins Virginia Cavaliers
- First meeting: April 24, 1926; Maryland 10, Virginia 1
- Latest meeting: March 14, 2026; Maryland 13, Virginia 12 (3OT)

Statistics
- Total meetings: 100
- All-time series: Maryland leads, 53–47
- Largest victory: Maryland, 22–3 (1929)
- Longest win streak: Maryland, 8 (1926–1952, 1954–1961)
- Current win streak: Maryland, 3 (2024–present)

The Maryland–Virginia lacrosse rivalry (or Virginia–Maryland lacrosse rivalry) is an intercollegiate lacrosse rivalry between the Virginia Cavaliers and Maryland Terrapins. The teams first met in 1926 and have met 96 times, the second-most for UVA and third-most for UMD against any opponent. The two are some of the most historically successful intercollegiate programs, combining for twenty-one national titles, ten of which have come in the NCAA era. The Cavaliers and Terrapins were league foes in the Atlantic Coast Conference from 1954 to 2014, before Maryland joined the Big Ten the following year. The teams ceased their annual matchup until a meeting five years later in the 2019 NCAA Lacrosse Championship, won by Virginia on the way to their sixth NCAA championship. The 2020 season was cancelled due to the COVID-19 pandemic, but games have resumed since.

These rivals have met twice to decide national titles, with Virginia winning their fifth and seventh NCAA championships (in 2011 and in 2021) over Maryland in hotly contested title matches. They had previously met once in the semifinals, in 2003, with the Cavaliers defeating the Terps en route to Virginia's third NCAA championship.

Maryland leads the all-time series 52–47 through 2026, but Virginia has held the upper hand, 39–22, since 1980.

== Series history ==
=== Maryland's early dominance (1926 to 1968) ===
The series was dominated by Maryland early on, with each of the first four meetings being no closer than nine goals. After five games in six years, the series would go on an 18-year hiatus before resuming as an annual fixture in 1950. Virginia grabbed its victory in nine tries with a five-goal win in College Park.

The following year, the teams would meet in 1954 as conference foes for the first time. Maryland continued its early series dominance in response to its first series loss by reeling off another eight consecutive victories. Virginia would snap that streak with its first home victory in 1962, before closing the decade with its first victory in College Park since 1953 in a 9–7 win. A victory the following year would be the final before the advent of the NCAA Division I Men's Lacrosse Championship. At the end of this era, Maryland would hold a commanding 21 to 5 series lead, punctuated by its eight-game winning streaks.

The advent of the NCAA tournament and rise of Virginia as a major lacrosse power led to a hotly contested period in the series's history. However, the Terps would win the final five meetings of the 1970s, including their first meeting in the postseason, a 15 to 10 victory in the 1978 quarterfinals.

=== Virginia's modern dominance (1980 to present) ===
Virginia would grab the initiative in 1980, winning seven of the next eight, though Maryland would again top the Cavaliers in the 1983 quarterfinals. Since 1980, the Cavs have won 37 of 55 meetings to narrow Maryland's series lead to just two games. Nonetheless, the meetings have often been between top five ranked teams and have led to numerous classic games. One of the most significant was the sole meeting in 2009, the longest lacrosse game in NCAA history. An unintentional whistle by the officiating staff negated what would have been a game-winning goal by Terrapins attackman Grant Catalino in the first overtime. After seven overtime periods, the Cavaliers finally put away Maryland with the game-winning tenth goal to prevail 10–9, and preserved its perfect record, 11–0. The game would ultimately be the determinant in the ACC regular season championship, as the Terrapins' loss tied them with Virginia in a split title.

With the advent of the ACC postseason lacrosse tournament in 1989, the two teams would meet even more frequently. The programs would meet 14 times in the ACC postseason, with UVA holding a 8–6 lead in these games. In the NCAA tournament, the Cavaliers hold the series lead at four victories to three, winning each of the last four matchups. The most significant NCAA meeting occurred in the 2011, as Virginia downed the Terps in the title game by two goals to win their fifth NCAA championship.

After the Terps departed the ACC for the Big Ten, they would not play the Cavs again until the 2019 edition of the NCAA tournament. Old sentiments stirred again in a controversial Virginia victory in the quarters. While Maryland controlled much of the match and held a commanding five-goal lead at one point, the Cavaliers rallied in the fourth quarter, helped by a critical call that attackman Michael Kraus' shot was deemed a score despite clanging off the post. Virginia took the opening faceoff in overtime, and Matt Moore scored 45 seconds later to propel the Cavaliers into the semifinal and end the Terps’ season short of the final four for the first time since 2013. UVA would ultimately defeat Yale in the final to win their eighth national championship. In 2020, the teams were scheduled to resume the rivalry with a regular season matchup that was ultimately cancelled as a result of the COVID-19 pandemic.

Virginia narrowly defeated Maryland, 17–16, in the Championship Game of the 2021 NCAA Division I Men's Lacrosse Championship to win their second consecutive and seventh overall NCAA Championship, and their second in a decade won by way of defeating Maryland in an NCAA title match.

== Rival accomplishments ==
The following summarizes the accomplishments of the two programs.

Team	Maryland Terrapins	Virginia Cavaliers
NCAA National Titles	4	7
Pre-NCAA National Titles	9	2
NCAA Final Four Appearances	28	24
NCAA Tournament Appearances	44	41
NCAA Tournament Record	67–40	56–33
NCAA Tournament Winning Percentage	.626	.629
Conference Tournament Titles	8	7
Conference Championships	37	25
Tewaarton Award Recipients	3	3
Lt. Raymond Enners Award Recipients	3	4
Consensus First Team All-Americans	129	70
All-time Program Record	855–276–4	673–375–6
All-time Winning Percentage	.755	.641

== Game results ==
Maryland victories	Virginia victories	Tie games

No.	Date	Location	Winner	Score
1	1926	College Park, MD	Maryland	10–1
2	1927	College Park, MD	Maryland	14–2
3	1928	College Park, MD	Maryland	17–1
4	1929	College Park, MD	Maryland	22–3
5	1932	College Park, MD	Maryland	7–1
6	1950	College Park, MD	Maryland	11–9^{OT}
7	1951	College Park, MD	Maryland	11–6
8	1952	Charlottesville, VA	Maryland	12–11
9	1953	College Park, MD	Virginia	12–7
10	1954	Charlottesville, VA	Maryland	18–7
11	1955	College Park, MD	Maryland	18–0
12	1956	Charlottesville, VA	Maryland	11–8
13	1957	College Park, MD	Maryland	14–5
14	1958	Charlottesville, VA	Maryland	21–5
15	1959	College Park, MD	Maryland	20–11
16	1960	Charlottesville, VA	Maryland	21–10
17	1961	College Park, MD	Maryland	14–8
18	1962	Charlottesville, VA	Virginia	8–5
19	1963	College Park, MD	Maryland	11–9
20	1964	Charlottesville, VA	Virginia	13–3
21	1965	College Park, MD	Maryland	13–9
22	1966	Charlottesville, VA	Maryland	14–6
23	1967	College Park, MD	Maryland	9–6
24	1968	Charlottesville, VA	Maryland	10–6
25	1969	College Park, MD	Virginia	9–7
26	1970	Charlottesville, VA	Virginia	9–3
27	1971	Charlottesville, VA	Virginia	9–8
28	1972	College Park, MD	Maryland	11–9
29	1973	Towson, MD	Virginia	10–9
30	1973	Charlottesville, VA	#2 Maryland	17–7
31	1974	College Park, MD	#1 Maryland	25–13
32	1975	Charlottesville, VA	#4 Virginia	14–13
33	1976	College Park, MD	#1 Maryland	24–15^{OT}
34	1977	Charlottesville, VA	#1 Maryland	22–12

No.	Date	Location	Winner	Score
35	1978	College Park, MD	#3 Maryland	13–8
36	1978	College Park, MD	#3 Maryland	15–10
37	1979	Charlottesville, VA	#2 Maryland	17–13
38	1980	College Park, MD	#1 Virginia	8–7
39	1981	Charlottesville, VA	#4 Virginia	23–12
40	1982	College Park, MD	#4 Virginia	14–11
41	1983	Charlottesville, VA	#6 Virginia	17–8
42	1983	Charlottesville, VA	#6 Maryland	13–4
43	1984	College Park, MD	#4 Virginia	10–5
44	1985	Charlottesville, VA	#5 Virginia	15–9
45	1986	College Park, MD	#7 Virginia	8–7^{OT}
46	1987	Charlottesville, VA	#1 Maryland	12–5
47	1988	College Park, MD	#5 Virginia	14–13
48	1989	Charlottesville, VA	#4 Maryland	13–9
49	1990	College Park, MD	#7 Virginia	21–12
50	1991	Charlottesville, VA	#5 Virginia	10–9
51	1991	Durham, NC	#4 Maryland	10–9
52	1992	College Park, MD	#9 Maryland	12–11
53	1993	Charlottesville, VA	#7 Virginia	11–10^{OT}
54	1993	College Park, MD	#13 Maryland	9–8^{OT}
55	1994	College Park, MD	#3 Virginia	9–7
56	1995	Charlottesville, VA	#3 Virginia	12–11
57	1996	College Park, MD	#1 Virginia	13–11
58	1996	Charlottesville, VA	#3 Virginia	13–9
59	1997	Charlottesville, VA	Virginia	15–14^{2OT}
60	1997	College Park, MD	#10 Maryland	10–9
61	1998	College Park, MD	#2 Maryland	14–9
62	1998	Charlottesville, VA	#2 Maryland	14–11
63	1999	Charlottesville, VA	Virginia	13–4
64	1999	Chapel Hill, NC	#5 Virginia	15–6
65	2000	College Park, MD	#2 Virginia	11–6
66	2000	College Park, MD	#1 Virginia	11–7
67	2001	Charlottesville, VA	#7 Virginia	7–2
68	2001	Orlando, FL	#3 Maryland	12–8

No.	Date	Location	Winner	Score
69	2002	College Park, MD	#2 Virginia	11–10
70	2003	Charlottesville, VA	#7 Maryland	8–7
71	2003	Baltimore, MD	#2 Virginia	14–4
72	2004	College Park, MD	#1 Maryland	11–2
73	2004	Chapel Hill, NC	#3 Maryland	12–11
74	2005	Charlottesville, VA	#3 Virginia	10–2
75	2005	Baltimore, MD	#10 Maryland	8–7
76	2006	College Park, MD	#1 Virginia	15–5
77	2006	Baltimore, MD	#1 Virginia	11–5
78	2007	Charlottesville, VA	#3 Virginia	12–8
79	2007	Durham, NC	#3 Virginia	11–10
80	2008	College Park, MD	#4 Maryland	13–7
81	2008	College Park, MD	#3 Virginia	11–8
82	2008	Annapolis, MD	#2 Virginia	9–8^{OT}
83	2009	Charlottesville, VA	#1 Virginia	10–9^{7OT}
84	2010	College Park, MD	#1 Virginia	11–10
85	2010	College Park, MD	#2 Virginia	10–6
86	2011	Charlottesville, VA	#10 Maryland	12–7
87	2011	Baltimore, MD; NCAA Championship Game	#10 Virginia	9–7
88	2012	College Park, MD	#3 Virginia	12–8
89	2013	Charlottesville, VA	#2 Maryland	9–7
90	2013	Chapel Hill, NC	Virginia	13–6
91	2014	College Park, MD	#4 Maryland	9–6
92	2019	Hempstead, NY	#4 Virginia	13–12^{OT}
93	2021	East Hartford, CT; NCAA Championship Game	#4 Virginia	17–16
94	2022	Washington, DC	#1 Maryland	23–12
95	2022	Columbus, OH	#1 Maryland	18–9
96	2023	Charlottesville, VA	#3 Maryland	14–13^{OT}
97	2024	College Park, MD	#4 Virginia	14–10
98	2024	Philadelphia, PA	#11 Maryland	12–6
99	2025	Charlottesville, VA	#1 Maryland	12–6
100	2026	College Park, MD	#10 Maryland	13–12^{3OT}
Series: Maryland leads 53–47

== See also ==
- Maryland–Virginia football rivalry
- Maryland–Virginia men's soccer rivalry
