= Lars Tiffany =

American lacrosse coach (born 1968)

Biographical details
- Born: June 15, 1968 (age 58); LaFayette, New York, U.S.

Playing career
- 1986–1990: Brown
- Position: Defenseman

Coaching career (HC unless noted)
- 2005–2006: Stony Brook
- 2007–2016: Brown
- 2017–2026: Virginia

Head coaching record
- Overall: 154–87 (.639)
- Tournaments: 6–4 (.600)

Accomplishments and honors

Championships
- 2021 NCAA national championship; 2019 NCAA national championship; 2019 ACC championship; 2016 Ivy League championship; 2015 Ivy League championship; 2008 Ivy League championship

Awards
- 2019 ACC Coach of the Year; 2016 Ivy League Coach of the Year; 2015 Ivy League Coach of the Year

Lars Tiffany (born June 15, 1968) is an American lacrosse coach. He was most recently the head coach of the Virginia Cavaliers men's lacrosse program at the University of Virginia from 2017 to 2026, where he led the program to back-to-back national titles in 2019 and 2021 (the 2020 tournament was cancelled due to COVID-19). He was named 2019 ACC Coach of the Year. As with his predecessor Dom Starsia, Tiffany came to Virginia after coaching his alma mater at Brown. There, he was the 2015 and 2016 Ivy League Coach of the Year. On November 1, 2022, he was named as the head coach for the Haudenosaunee men's national lacrosse team for the 2023 World Lacrosse Championship.

== Early life ==
Born in LaFayette, New York, Tiffany attended LaFayette High School, where he played football, basketball, as well as lacrosse. At Lafayette he was classmates with members of the Onondaga nation which strengthened his love for lacrosse, a sport that their indigenous ancestors pioneered. Tiffany's father owned a ranch adjacent to Onondaga land that also had wild buffalo on. His father made a treaty with the Onondagans to allow eleven of his buffalo to live on their land with all of the calves born to stay on their land. In 1986, he enrolled at Brown University, where he played lacrosse and served as captain for two years. He played in the NCAA tournament in 1987 and 1990. In 1990, he was selected to play in the annual North-South Senior All-Star Game.

In 1985, Tiffany became the first white man to play for the Haudenosaunee national team, then called the Iroquois Nationals.

== Coaching career ==
=== Stevenson School ===
After graduating from Brown with a degree in biology, Tiffany accepted a teaching and coaching position at the Stevenson School in Pebble Beach, California.

=== Lemoyne College ===
Tiffany's first foray into college coaching was as an assistant coach for the women's team at LeMoyne College in his hometown of Syracuse NY.

=== Washington & Lee University ===
Lars' first men's collegiate coaching position was with the Washington and Lee Generals in the 1997 and 1998 seasons where he was an assistant for Premier Lacrosse League champion and current head coach of the Whipsnakes Lacrosse Club, Jim Stagnitta.

=== Dartmouth College ===
Lars returned to Division 1 lacrosse and the Ivy League when he became an assistant coach for the men's lacrosse program at Dartmouth College for the 1999 and 2000 seasons.

=== Penn State ===
Lars spent four years at Penn State (2000–2004) as the top assistant under head coach Glenn Thiel.

=== Stony Brook ===
Tiffany had his first position as a head coach for the Stony Brook Seawolves men's lacrosse program in 2005 and 2006. In 2005 he was named the America East Conference coach of the year.

=== Brown University ===
Tiffany was the head lacrosse coach from 2007–2016 at his alma mater. During this time he amassed a 95–56 record, won the Ivy League Championship four times (2008, 2010, 2015, and 2016), and made the NCAA tournament three times, going as far as the Final Four in 2016, his final season.

=== University of Virginia ===
Tiffany became the 17th head coach of the Virginia men’s lacrosse program on June 21, 2016.

During Tiffany’s first season at UVA, his Cavalier offense finished No. 1 in the ACC and No. 3 in the nation in three offensive categories: goals per game (14.40), assists per game (9.13) and points per game (23.53). Aitken shattered UVA’s freshmen midfielder record of 29 goals and 40 points. Aitken broke the goals record in eight games. Attackman Kraus was named ACC Freshman of the Year and was the only rookie on the All-ACC team after leading UVA with 34 goals and 56 points.

In 2018, Tiffany’s Cavalier team ranked No. 1 nationally in ground balls (38.0). Defensively in 2017, Virginia led the nation with 43.33 ground balls per game, averaging nearly seven more ground balls per game then No. 2 Brown (36.56), Tiffany’s previous program. Prior to Tiffany coming to UVA, his Brown squad in 2016 led the nation in ground balls as Tiffany’s staff three years in a row has led the nation’s best team on the ground.

In 2018, Tiffany’s Cavaliers were No. 5 nationally in assists (7.72), No. 7 in points per game (20.33) and No. 7 in scoring offense (12.61). Michael Kraus became the third Cavalier in program history to reach 80 points in a season, finishing with 83, ranking No. 8 nationally. First-team All-American midfielder Dox Aitken set a midfielder program record with 51 points in 2018. In 2018, the Cavaliers were runners-up in the ACC tournament.

In 2019, the Cavaliers won both the ACC tournament as well as the NCAA Tournament. This marked the sixth NCAA tournament championship for the University of Virginia, and Tiffany's first as a head coach.

In 2021, Tiffany led the Cavaliers back to the national championship game defeating top-seeded North Carolina in the national semifinals. In the final, Virginia defeated the previously undefeated (and historic rivals) Maryland Terrapins 17–16 to earn Tiffany back-to-back NCAA Championships and the ninth national title overall for Virginia men's lacrosse.

Tiffany was relieved of his duties on 18 May 2026, eight days after the fifth-seeded Cavaliers' 14–10 home loss to Georgetown in the NCAA Tournament. He was replaced by associate head coach/offensive coordinator Kevin Cassese on 26 May.

== Personal life ==
Tiffany resides in Charlottesville, Virginia with his wife and their child. He has been a vegetarian for over thirty years.
