= 2011 NCAA Division I men's lacrosse tournament =

- Dates: May 14–30, 2011
- Teams: 16
- Finals site: M&T Bank Stadium; Baltimore, Maryland
- Champions: Virginia (5th title)
- Runner-up: Maryland (10th title game)
- Semifinalists: Denver (1st Final Four); Duke (7th Final Four)
- Winning coach: Dom Starsia (Virginia title)
- MOP: Colin Briggs, Virginia
- Attendance: 45,039 semi-finals 35,661 finals 80,700 total
- Top scorer: Steele Stanwick, Virginia (21 goals)

The 2011 NCAA Division I lacrosse tournament was the 41st annual tournament hosted by the National Collegiate Athletic Association to determine the team champion of men's college lacrosse among its Division I programs, held at the end of the 2011 NCAA Division I men's lacrosse season. The tournament was held from May 14–30, 2011.

Virginia won its fifth NCAA lacrosse championship and seventh college title overall, defeating Maryland in the title game, 9–7. Maryland became only the fourth unseeded team to reach the finals and the second unseeded in a row. This was the first all-ACC title game since the 1986 championship.

The championship game was played at M&T Bank Stadium, the home of the NFL's Baltimore Ravens, in Baltimore, Maryland, with a crowd of 35,661 fans.

== Overview ==
During the tournament, Virginia head coach Dom Starsia became the winningest coach in Division I men's lacrosse history, earning his 327th career win in the quarterfinals against Cornell, surpassing Jack Emmer's record of 326. In addition, the first-round match between Denver and Villanova, held at Peter Barton Lacrosse Stadium on the DU campus on May 15, was historically notable as the first Division I men's tournament game ever to be held west of the Mississippi River.

== Qualifying ==
Sixteen teams were selected to compete in the tournament based upon their performance during the regular season, and for some, by means of a conference tournament.

== Bracket ==
First Round; May 14–15
1	Syracuse	10
Siena	4
8	North Carolina	6
Maryland	13
4	Notre Dame	13
Penn	6
5	Duke	15
Delaware	14
3	Johns Hopkins	12
Hofstra	5
6	Denver	13
Villanova	10
7	Virginia	13*
Bucknell	12
2	Cornell	12
Hartford	5

Quarterfinals; May 21–22
1	Syracuse	5
Maryland	6*
4	Notre Dame	5
5	Duke	7
3	Johns Hopkins	9
6	Denver	14
7	Virginia	13
2	Cornell	9

Semifinals; May 28
Maryland	9
5	Duke	4
6	Denver	8
7	Virginia	14

Final; May 30
Maryland	7
7	Virginia	9

- * = Overtime

== See also ==
- 2011 NCAA Division I women's lacrosse tournament
