= Lehigh Mountain Hawks men's lacrosse =

- Founded: 1885
- University: Lehigh University
- Head coach: Will Scudder
- Stadium: Frank Banko Field (capacity: 1,534)
- Location: Bethlehem, Pennsylvania
- Conference: Patriot League
- Nickname: Hawks
- Colors: Brown and white

Pre-NCAA era championships
- (11) – 1890, 1893, 1895, 1896, 1897, 1914, 1916, 1917, 1920, 1921, 1959 (USILA Class C Division III Co-Champion)

NCAA Tournament appearances
- (4) - 2012, 2013, 2021, 2024

Conference Tournament championships
- (4) - 2012, 2013, 2021, 2024

Conference regular season championships
- (5) - 1999, 2012, 2013, 2021, 2024

The Lehigh Mountain Hawks men's lacrosse team represents Lehigh University in NCAA Division I college lacrosse. The Mountain Hawks play their home games at Frank Banko Field, which is part of a complex that also includes Lehigh's soccer and field hockey venues. Will Scudder is the program's current head coach since June 19, 2023.

== Overview ==
Lehigh is a charter member of the USILA, one of about two dozen.

=== Early national titles ===
According to Lehigh's Epitome Yearbook, lacrosse was introduced at Lehigh in 1884 and four years later, Lehigh entered the Inter-collegiate Lacrosse Association, mostly through the efforts of Arnold K. Reese, an 1889 graduate, who captained and trained the team throughout his college career. Lehigh played its first varsity lacrosse game on May 9, 1885 against Stevens Tech.

According to the Lehigh Burr, Lehigh was a top team in the early years of inter-collegiate lacrosse. Lehigh was third in 1888, second in 1889, and was voted the National Champion in 1890. In what was billed as a "Championship Series" that season, Lehigh defeated Princeton, Johns Hopkins and Stevens Tech to win the title.

Since starting lacrosse, the team has a record of 647-715-10 in 135 lacrosse seasons.

=== Recent history ===
Lehigh has made four appearances in the NCAA Tournament; their first was in 2012. They earned an automatic bid into the tournament by winning the Patriot League conference tournament over Bucknell, 13–9.

Their first NCAA Tournament game ended in defeat, losing 10–9 against Maryland, after being seeded number seven in the tournament. The Mountain Hawks made the tournament again in 2013, in which they lost to North Carolina.

In 2021, the Hawks advanced to the Patriot League final by defeating Colgate 13–9 in the semi-finals. The conference championship game against Loyola, scheduled for May 9, 2021, was canceled after an outbreak of Covid-19 on the Loyola team. By virtue of the no-contest, Lehigh became the Patriot League's automatic qualifier for the 2021 NCAA Division I Men's Lacrosse Championship. The Hawks were defeated in the first round by Rutgers.

Head coach Kevin Cassese, who had led the Mountain Hawks to each of their conference tournament championships and NCAA tournament appearances, left the program to become associate head coach at Virginia on June 19, 2023. Associate head coach/defensive coordinator and Lehigh lacrosse alumnus, Will Scudder, was promoted to succeed Cassese on the same day.

In Scudder's first year at the helm in 2024, despite low expectations entering the season, the Mountain Hawks tied Army West Point for a share of the Patriot League regular season title and won the Patriot League tournament, beating Navy 12-8 in the semifinals and Boston University 11-10 in the championship game. The Mountain Hawks advanced to the 2024 NCAA Tournament, where they ultimately fell to Johns Hopkins 13-10 in the first round.

== Season results ==
The following is a list of Lehigh’s season results during the NCAA Division I era starting in 1971, as well as certain pre-NCAA era seasons:

Season	Coach	Overall	Conference	Standing	Postseason
Pre-NCAA Era (Independent) (1885–1970)
1890		4-1-1			Intercollegiate Lacrosse Association National Championship
1893		6-1			Intercollegiate Lacrosse Association National Championship
1921		8-1			United States Inter-Collegiate Lacrosse League National Championship
1959		7-4			USILA Class C Division III National Co-Champion
Steve Jacobson (Independent) (1971–1972)
1971	Steve Jacobson	8–3			
Steve Jacobson:		8–3 (.727)			
Tom Gilburg (Independent) (1972–1975)
1972	Tom Gilburg	5–7			
1973	Tom Gilburg	8–4			
1974	Tom Gilburg	3–9			
1975	Tom Gilburg	5–6			
Tom Gilburg:		21–26 (.447)			
John Luckhardt (Independent) (1976–1978)
1976	John Luckhardt	5–6			
1977	John Luckhardt	6–6			
1978	John Luckhardt	7–5			
John Luckhardt:		18–17 (.514)			
Harry Price (Independent) (1979–1980)
1979	Harry Price	7–5			
1980	Harry Price	7–6			
Harry Price:		14–11 (.560)			
Pete vonHoffman (Independent) (1981–1981)
1981	Pete vonHoffman	3–10			
Pete vonHoffman:		3–10 (.231)			
Jeff Tipping (Independent) (1982–1982)
1982	Jeff Tipping	2–12			
Jeff Tipping:		2–12 (.143)			
Bob Shape (Independent) (1983–1984)
1983	Bob Shape	5–9			
1984	Bob Shape	4–10			
Bob Shape:		9–19 (.321)			
John McCloskey (Independent) (1985–1990)
1985	John McCloskey	6–8			
1986	John McCloskey	8–6			
1987	John McCloskey	9–5			
1988	John McCloskey	5–8			
1989	John McCloskey	2–7			
1990	John McCloskey	2–12			
John McCloskey (Patriot League) (1991–2001)
1991	John McCloskey	5–8	2–3	T–4th	
1992	John McCloskey	7–7	3–2	T–2nd	
1993	John McCloskey	10–5	3–2	T–2nd	
1994	John McCloskey	12–3	4–1	2nd	
1995	John McCloskey	8–6	4–1	2nd	
1996	John McCloskey	5–9	2–3	4th	
1997	John McCloskey	11–4	4–1	2nd	
1998	John McCloskey	6–7	3–2	T–2nd	
1999	John McCloskey	7–6	4–1	T–1st	
2000	John McCloskey	7–7	2–4	T–5th	
2001	John McCloskey	4–10	2–4	T–4th	
John McCloskey:		114–118 (.491)	33–24 (.579)		
Chris Wakely (Patriot League) (2002–2007)
2002	Chris Wakely	5–9	2–4	5th	
2003	Chris Wakely	5–9	2–4	5th	
2004	Chris Wakely	4–10	2–5	6th	
2005	Chris Wakely	9–5	3–3	4th	
2006	Chris Wakely	8–7	4–2	3rd	
2007	Chris Wakely	4–9	2–4	5th	
Chris Wakely:		35–49 (.417)	15–22 (.405)		
Kevin Cassese (Patriot League) (2008–Present)
2008	Kevin Cassese	6–9	2–4	5th	
2009	Kevin Cassese	4–11	2–4	5th	
2010	Kevin Cassese	8–7	2–4	6th	
2011	Kevin Cassese	7–9	3–3	4th	
2012	Kevin Cassese	14–3	5–1	2nd	NCAA Division I First Round
2013	Kevin Cassese	12–5	6–0	1st	NCAA Division I First Round
2014	Kevin Cassese	13–5	6–2	3rd	
2015	Kevin Cassese	7–9	3–5	6th	
2016	Kevin Cassese	6–9	4–4	5th	
2017	Kevin Cassese	7–7	4–4	5th	
2018	Kevin Cassese	10–7	5–3	4th	
2019	Kevin Cassese	9–8	5–3	2nd	
2020	Kevin Cassese	5–1	2–0	†	†
2021	Kevin Cassese	10–2	8–0	1st (South)	NCAA Division I First Round
2022	Kevin Cassese	8–7	5–3	4th	
2023	Kevin Cassese	10-5	6-2	3rd	
Kevin Cassese:		136–104 (.567)	68–42 (.618)		
Will Scudder (Patriot League) (2024–Present)
2024	Will Scudder	10-7	6-2	2nd	NCAA Division I First Round
2025	Will Scudder	5–10	4–4	4th	
2026	Will Scudder	8–8	4–4	6th	
Will Scudder:		23–25 (.479)	14–10 (.583)		
Total:		667–739–17 (.475)			
National champion Postseason invitational champion Conference regular season champion Conference regular season and conference tournament champion Division regular season champion Division regular season and conference tournament champion Conference tournament champion

† NCAA canceled 2020 collegiate activities due to the COVID-19 virus.

== See also ==
- USILA List of Champions
- Chris Cameron
- Lacrosse in Pennsylvania
- Division I men's lacrosse records
