= Denver Pioneers men's lacrosse =

Student athletics organization

Denver Pioneers
- Founded: 1966
- University: University of Denver
- Head coach: Matt Brown (from 2024 season)
- Stadium: Peter Barton Lacrosse Stadium (capacity: 2,000)
- Location: Denver, Colorado
- Conference: Big East Conference
- Nickname: Pioneers
- Colors: Crimson and gold

NCAA Tournament championships
- (1) – 2015

NCAA Tournament Final Fours
- (6) – 2011, 2013, 2014, 2015, 2017, 2024

NCAA Tournament Quarterfinals
- (8) – 2011, 2012, 2013, 2014, 2015, 2017, 2018, 2024

NCAA Tournament appearances
- (13) – 2006, 2008, 2010, 2011, 2012, 2013, 2014, 2015, 2016, 2017, 2018, 2021, 2024

Conference Tournament championships
- (3) – 2011, 2014, 2015

Conference regular season championships
- (15) – 2003, 2005, 2006, 2008, 2010, 2011, 2013, 2014, 2015, 2016, 2017, 2018, 2019, 2021, 2024

The Denver Pioneers men's lacrosse team represents the University of Denver (DU) in National Collegiate Athletic Association (NCAA) Division I college lacrosse. The DU men's lacrosse program was first introduced in 1966 as a club sport. The program alternated between varsity and club status until entering Division I in 1999.

Since the 2014 season, the Pioneers have competed as an associate member of the Big East Conference. DU was initially a Big East member in men's lacrosse only, but added women's lacrosse to its Big East membership in advance of the 2017 season. Before DU's move to the Big East for the 2014 season, it had been a member of the Great Western Lacrosse League from 1998 to 2009 and then the ECAC Lacrosse League from 2010 to 2013.

Through 2015, Denver has an all-time varsity record of 272–203–1. In Division I alone, they are 173–95. Denver plays its home games at Peter Barton Lacrosse Stadium, which has a capacity of 2,000 people.

== Early years ==
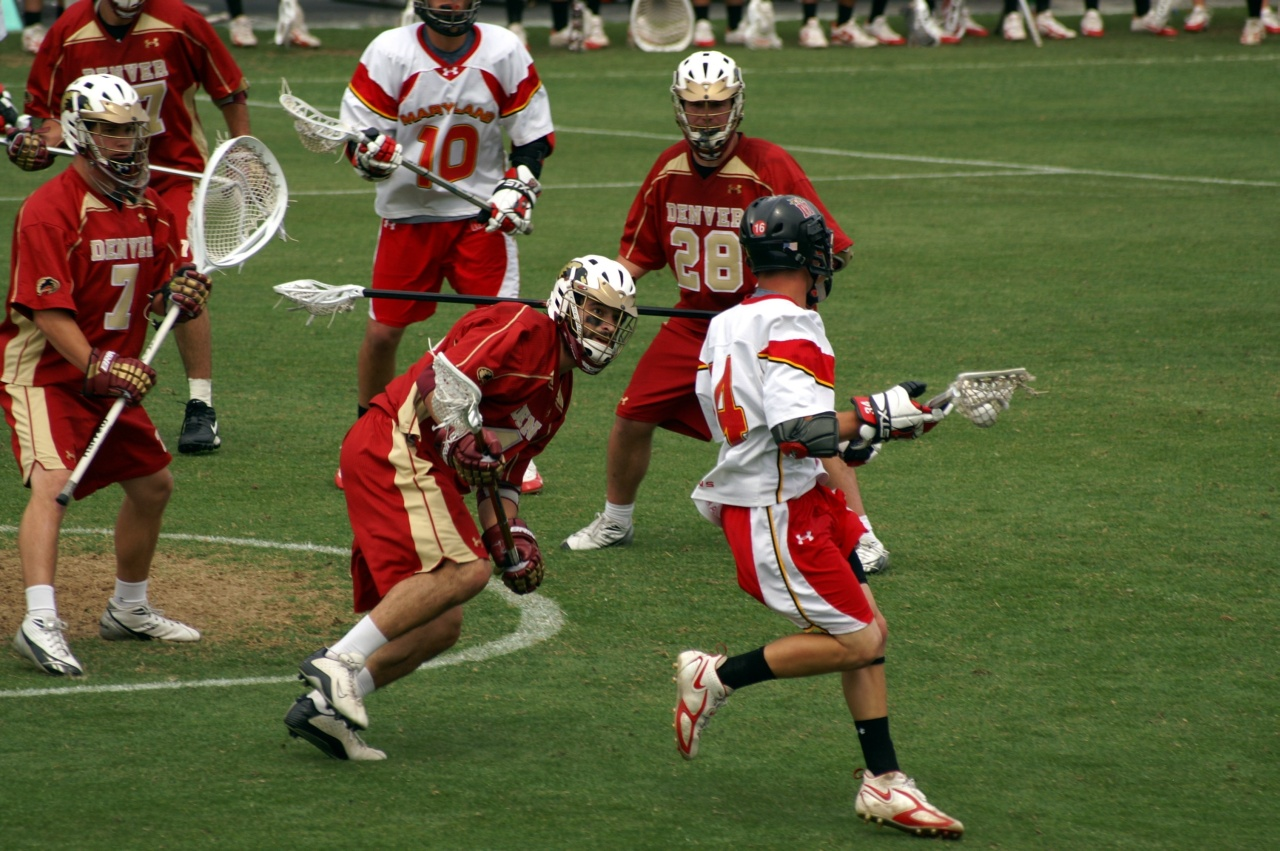
Denver plays Maryland in 2006

The University of Denver first began sponsoring men's lacrosse as a club sport in 1966 under coach Pete Richardson. Over the next 24 years, the team would alternate between varsity and club status in the RMLA, a member of the US Lacrosse Intercollegiate Associates (USLIA). In 1991, Denver transitioned into NCAA Division II as a member of the RMILL before making the full transition to Division I with the rest of DU sports in 1999. The Pioneers first joined the Great Western Lacrosse League (GWLL) as a charter member in 1994, although the Pioneers would not compete in the conference as a full Division I member until 1999.

In 1999, Denver hired Jamie Munro as head coach for the team's inaugural season in Division I and the GWLL. Under Munro, the Pioneers would win their first conference regular season title after finishing with a 4–1 conference record (tied with Notre Dame and Ohio State). After winning the GWLL outright in 2006 with a 5–0 conference record, Denver earned a bid to their first NCAA Tournament, where they would fall 16–8 to Maryland. Two years later the Pioneers again shared the GWLL regular season title with Notre Dame and Ohio State, but earned an at-large bid to the 2008 NCAA Tournament with a 10–7 overall record. Denver would lose to Maryland once again, this time 10–7.

After finishing 1–4 in the conference and 7–8 overall in 2009, Jamie Munro resigned. Munro finished with a 90–70 record as head coach of the Pioneers, securing four GWLL Championship titles (2003, 2005, 2006, 2008) and two NCAA postseason tournament appearances (2006, 2008). He was also named GWLL Coach of the Year in 2000 and 2006.

== Bill Tierney era ==
In 2009, Hall of Fame coach Bill Tierney was named head coach of the Pioneers. Tierney was previously the coach at Princeton for 22 years, earning 6 NCAA championships in 9 years, appearing in 8 championship games, 9 Final Fours and 11 Ivy League championships.

In 2010, the Pioneers tied the program-best record of 12–5 and earned the ECAC regular season title after completing a 7–0 conference record. Denver would earn just their third NCAA Tournament berth, where they would lose to Stony Brook, 9–7, in the first round.

In 2011, the Pioneers completed a 15–3 record, again going undefeated in the ECAC at 6–0 to capture the conference regular season and tournament championships. In the 2011 NCAA Tournament the No. 6-seeded Pioneers hosted No. 11 Villanova in front of a standing room-only home crowd of 2,575. In the first NCAA Tournament game to ever be held west of the Mississippi River, Denver earned its first ever tournament win, beating Villanova 13–10 to advance to the quarterfinals. In the quarterfinal round Denver defeated Johns Hopkins 14–9 at James M. Shuart Stadium in Hempstead, New York to earn a spot in the NCAA Final Four. At M&T Bank Stadium in Baltimore the Pioneers would fall to the eventual champion Virginia by a score of 14–8.

Following the school's first NCAA Final Four, the Pioneers completed a 9–7 record while going 3–3 in the ECAC. Although the 9–7 regular season tally did not compare to previous season records, Denver lost six one–goal games, including four in overtime throughout the season. The Pioneers would still make the 2012 NCAA Tournament thanks to one of the toughest schedules in the country. In the first round the Pioneers defeated North Carolina 16–14 in Chapel Hill, North Carolina, but would go on to lose to conference rival and eventual national champion Loyola-Maryland for the third time, by a score of 10–9 in front of 13,390 fans at the Navy–Marine Corps Memorial Stadium in Annapolis, Maryland.

In 2013, Denver would once again capture the ECAC regular season crown after earning a 6–1 conference record and an 11–3 overall record. After the 11th week of the season Denver would earn the No. 1 ranking in both the Nike/Inside Lacrosse Media Poll and the USILA Coaches Poll, the first time in program history that they have been ranked No. 1 in the country. Denver would go on to lose to Ohio State in the ECAC title game, but the Pioneers would earn an at-large bid to the 2013 NCAA Tournament. In the first round Denver would host just the second NCAA Tournament game held west of the Mississippi at a sold out Peter Barton Lacrosse Stadium. A record 2,621 fans were on hand to see Denver top Albany 19–14. In the quarterfinals, Denver faced a rematch of a 2011 first round game against North Carolina, this time at Lucas Oil Stadium in Indianapolis, Indiana. After falling behind 6–0 early on, the Pioneers were behind 9–4 at the half but would go 8–2 in the second half, including 5–1 in the final quarter to win 12–11. Denver became the first team in Men’s Lacrosse Championship Quarterfinal history to win after trailing by five goals or more. In the Pioneer's second semifinal appearance in three years, Denver would fall to Syracuse 9–8 at Lincoln Financial Field in Philadelphia, Pennsylvania. Denver would end the season 14–5 and ranked No. 4 in the final polls.

The 2015 season was the most successful in DU lacrosse history. The Pioneers won both the Big East regular-season and tournament titles, earning a #4 seed in that year's NCAA tournament. They went on to win the NCAA title, defeating Maryland in the final at Lincoln Financial Field and becoming the first-ever NCAA men's lacrosse champion from outside the Eastern Time Zone.

On January 5, 2023, Tierney announced he would retire at the end of the 2023 season. During the 2023 season, Tierney's top assistant Matt Brown, also a former Pioneers player, was announced as Tierney's replacement.

== Season Results ==
The following is a list of Denver's season results since becoming an NCAA Division II program in 1991 and becoming a full member of Division I in 1999:

Season	Coach	Overall	Conference	Standing	Postseason
Jon Bock (Rocky Mountain Intercollegiate Lacrosse League) (1990–1991)
1991	Jon Bock	6–5	6–2		
Jon Bock:		6–5 (.545)	6–2 (.750)		
Judd Donnelly (Rocky Mountain Intercollegiate Lacrosse League) (1992–1994)
1992	Judd Donnelly	3–11	2–5		
1993	Judd Donnelly	9–7	5–2		
1994	Judd Donnelly	6–8	4–4		
Judd Donnelly:		18–26 (.409)	11–11 (.500)		
David Croft (Rocky Mountain Intercollegiate Lacrosse League) (1995–1996)
1995	David Croft	8–5	5–1		
David Croft:		8–5 (.615)	5–1 (.833)		
Brion Salazar (Rocky Mountain Intercollegiate Lacrosse League) (1996–1997)
1996	Brion Salazar	9–6	5–1		
1997	Brion Salazar	4–6	0–0		
Brion Salazar (Great Western Lacrosse League) (1997–1998)
1998	Brion Salazar	4–8	0–4		
Brion Salazar:		17–20 (.459)	5–5 (.500)		
Jaime Munro (Great Western Lacrosse League) (1999–2009)
1999	Jaime Munro	4–8	1–3		
2000	Jaime Munro	10–4	2–2		
2001	Jaime Munro	6–7	3–2		
2002	Jaime Munro	6–8	1–4		
2003	Jaime Munro	9–5	4–1	T–1st	
2004	Jaime Munro	8–6	3–2		
2005	Jaime Munro	9–5	4–1	T–1st	
2006	Jaime Munro	12–5	5–0	1st	NCAA Division I First Round
2007	Jaime Munro	9–7	3–2		
2008	Jaime Munro	10–7	4–1	T–1st	NCAA Division I First Round
2009	Jaime Munro	7–8	1–4		
Jaime Munro:		90–70 (.563)	33–22 (.600)		
Bill Tierney (ECAC Lacrosse League) (2010–2013)
2010	Bill Tierney	12–5	7–0	1st	NCAA Division I First Round
2011	Bill Tierney	15–3	6–0	1st	NCAA Division I Final Four
2012	Bill Tierney	9–7	3–3		NCAA Division I Quarterfinals
2013	Bill Tierney	14–5	6–1	1st	NCAA Division I Final Four
Bill Tierney (Big East Conference) (2014–2023)
2014	Bill Tierney	16–3	6–0	1st	NCAA Division I Final Four
2015	Bill Tierney	17–2	5–0	1st	NCAA Division I Champion
2016	Bill Tierney	13–3	5–0	1st	NCAA Division I First Round
2017	Bill Tierney	13–4	5–0	1st	NCAA Division I Final Four
2018	Bill Tierney	13–4	5–0	1st	NCAA Division I Quarterfinals
2019	Bill Tierney	10–5	4–1	1st	
2020	Bill Tierney	4–2	0–0	†	†
2021	Bill Tierney	12–5	9–1	T–1st	NCAA Division I First Round
2022	Bill Tierney	9–6	4–1	2nd	
2023	Bill Tierney	10–5	4–1	2nd	
Bill Tierney:		167–53 (.759)	69–8 (.896)		
Matt Brown (Big East Conference) (2024–present)
2024	Matt Brown	13–4	5–0	1st	NCAA Division I Final Four
2025	Matt Brown	7–7	2–3	5th	
2026	Matt Brown	6–8	2–3	4th	
Matt Brown:		26–19 (.578)	9–6 (.600)		
Total:		332–198 (.626)			
National champion Postseason invitational champion Conference regular season champion Conference regular season and conference tournament champion Division regular season champion Division regular season and conference tournament champion Conference tournament champion

†The NCAA canceled 2020 collegiate activities due to the COVID-19 virus.

== Peter Barton Lacrosse Stadium ==
Peter Barton Lacrosse Stadium was completed in time for the 2005 collegiate lacrosse season in February and was formally dedicated on April 30, 2005. It is the first collegiate stadium in the nation to be designed solely for lacrosse, and is home to DU men's and women's lacrosse teams.The north-facing stadium can accommodate approximately 2,000 people and features pre-cast concrete bench seating, locker rooms for men and women, public restrooms, a concession area, viewing pavilion/conference room and a two-direction press box that also serves the soccer field to the south.

The stadium is named for the late Peter Barton, who was the former president and chief executive of cable television company Liberty Media Corp. Laura Barton, Peter Barton’s widow, donated the lead gift for the $6.32 million stadium complex. Other prominent donors were John and Anna Sie, and Myra Levy, whose family used to sell concessions at DU football games.

With a capacity of approximately 2,000, Peter Barton Lacrosse Stadium has hosted 26 sellout games (including an exhibition match against Johns Hopkins on January 30, 2016), including eight in a row (as of 2/28/16). DU is 76–14 all time at Peter Barton Lacrosse, including 45–5 under Coach Bill Tierney, and 21–4 in sellout games.

The 10 highest attendance games are listed below:

Rank	Attendance	Date	Result	Opponent
1	3,311	March 6, 2005	L 8–10	Towson
2	3,117	March 28, 2015	W 19–7	Georgetown
3	3,076	March 16, 2026	L 13–12	Syracuse
4	3,037	March 10, 2024	L 13-15	Yale
5	3,025	February 24, 2024	W 17-16	Cornell
6	2,969	April 29, 2022	W 16-8	Marquette
7	2,965	May 11, 2024	W 16-11*	Michigan
8	2,759	February 26, 2017	W 12–0	Canisius
9	2,748	May 10, 2014	W 9–5*	North Carolina
10	2,728	March 7, 2015	W 11–10	Notre Dame

*NCAA Tournament Game
