= Kevin Cassese =

American lacrosse player and coach

Current position
- Title: Head coach
- Team: Virginia Cavaliers
- Conference: Atlantic Coast Conference

Biographical details
- Born: April 5, 1981 (age 45); Port Jefferson Station, New York, U.S.
- Height: 6 ft 0 in (183 cm)
- Weight: 200 lb (91 kg; 14 st 4 lb)
- Education: Duke University

Playing career
- 2000–2003: Duke
- Position: Midfield

Coaching career (HC unless noted)
- 2004–2005: Stony Brook (assistant)
- 2005–2007: Duke (assistant)
- 2008–2023: Lehigh
- 2023–2026: Virginia (assistant)
- 2026–present: Virginia

Kevin Cassese (/kɑːˈsiːs/ kah-SEESS; born April 5, 1981) is an American lacrosse coach who is the head coach of the Virginia Cavaliers men's lacrosse team.

He is also a retired professional lacrosse player who spent seven years from 2003 to 2009 in Major League Lacrosse (MLL) with the Rochester Rattlers, Philadelphia Barrage, and Boston Cannons. He was the men's lacrosse head coach at Lehigh University for sixteen seasons from 2008 to 2023, and was the associate head coach/offensive coordinator at the University of Virginia from June 20, 2023 to May 26, 2026. On May 26, 2026 it was announced that Cassese had been selected the new head lacrosse coach at the University of Virginia, replacing Lars Tiffany.

== Playing career ==
Cassese played collegiate lacrosse at Duke University, where he helped lead the Blue Devils to three NCAA Tournament appearances. In 2002, he won the McLaughlin Award as the nation's top midfielder. In 2002, Cassese played with Team USA that won the World Lacrosse Championship. In 2006, he was also a member of the Team USA, who finished in second place.

Cassese played professionally with Major League Lacrosse's Rochester Rattlers from 2003 until June 29, 2007, when he was traded to the Philadelphia Barrage. He was named the MVP of the 2006 Major League Lacrosse All-Star Game as a member of Team USA. He was also a standout for the MLL's Boston Cannons.

== Coaching career ==
Cassese's coaching career began at Stony Brook University on August 31, 2004 when he was the first assistant hired by Lars Tiffany who had been appointed head coach three weeks earlier. He directed an extra-man offense which led the NCAA Division I with a 45.7 percent efficiency rate in his only campaign with the 10–6 Seawolves in 2005.

Cassese was reunited with Mike Pressler upon returning to his alma mater Duke in a similar capacity on July 1, 2005. He replaced Joe Alberici who had accepted the head coaching position with the United States Military Academy seventeen days prior. He was named interim head coach on June 5, 2006, two months after Pressler resigned amidst a criminal case involving the program. He resumed his assistant duties 6 1/2 weeks later when John Danowski became head coach on July 21. The Blue Devils had a 23–5 overall record and were a 2007 NCAA Division I finalist in his two years with its coaching staff.

Cassese was appointed as head coach at Lehigh University on July 5, 2007, succeeding Chris Wakely who had relinquished his duties a month earlier because of multiple sclerosis. His 136–104 overall record and .567 winning percentage in sixteen seasons with the Mountain Hawks both rank as the best in program history. He was a two-time Patriot League Coach of the Year in 2012 and 2021. His teams played in six Patriot League championship games, winning twice in 2012 and 2013 and earning a third automatic bid to the NCAA Championships in 2021. The Mountain Hawks were also the only team to qualify for twelve consecutive Patriot League Tournaments during the last thirteen years of Cassese's tenure at Lehigh.

A day after the announcement of his resignation from Lehigh and the promotion of associate head coach/defensive coordinator Will Scudder as his successor, Cassese was reunited with Tiffany as associate head coach/offensive coordinator at the University of Virginia on June 20, 2023.

On May 26, 2026, the University of Virginia announced that Cassese had been selected as Lars Tiffany's replacement for the head coach position of the Virginia Cavaliers men's lacrosse team.

== Awards ==
- Two-time Patriot League Coach of the Year in 2012 and 2021
- 2001 ACC Player of the Year
- Three time All-American
- Inducted into the Suffolk Sports Hall of Fame on Long Island, New York, in the Lacrosse Category with the Class of 2009.

Preceded by Doug Shanahan	McLaughlin Award; 2002	Succeeded by Chris Rotelli
