= Virginia Cavaliers men's lacrosse =

Men's lacrosse team representing the University of Virginia

- Founded: 1904; 1925
- University: University of Virginia
- Head coach: Kevin Cassese (1st season)
- Stadium: Klöckner Stadium (capacity: 8,000)
- Location: Charlottesville, Virginia
- Conference: Atlantic Coast Conference
- Nickname: Cavaliers
- Colors: Orange and blue

Pre-NCAA era championships
- 1952, 1970

NCAA Tournament championships
- 1972, 1999, 2003, 2006, 2011, 2019, 2021

NCAA Tournament Runner-Up
- 1980, 1986, 1994, 1996

NCAA Tournament Final Fours
- 1972, 1973, 1979, 1980, 1981, 1982, 1985, 1986, 1988, 1994, 1995, 1996, 1999, 2000, 2002, 2003, 2005, 2006, 2008, 2009, 2010, 2011, 2019, 2021, 2023, 2024

NCAA Tournament Quarterfinals
- 1971, 1972, 1973, 1974, 1978, 1979, 1980, 1981, 1982, 1983, 1984, 1985, 1986, 1988, 1993, 1994, 2000, 2002, 2003, 2005, 2006, 2008, 2009, 2010, 2011, 2012, 2019, 2021, 2022, 2023, 2024

NCAA Tournament appearances
- 1971, 1972, 1973, 1974, 1978, 1979, 1980, 1981, 1982, 1983, 1984, 1985, 1986, 1988, 1990, 1991, 1993, 1994, 1995, 1996, 1997, 1998, 1999, 2000, 2001, 2002, 2003, 2005, 2006, 2007, 2008, 2009, 2010, 2011, 2012, 2014, 2015, 2018, 2019, 2021, 2022, 2023, 2024, 2026

Conference Tournament championships
- 1997, 1999, 2000, 2003, 2006, 2010, 2019, 2026

Conference regular season championships
- 1962, 1964, 1969, 1970, 1971, 1975, 1980, 1983, 1984, 1985, 1986, 1990, 1993, 1994, 1995, 1997, 1999, 2000, 2002, 2003, 2006, 2009, 2010, 2012, 2019, 2022

The Virginia Cavaliers men's lacrosse team represents the University of Virginia in National Collegiate Athletic Association (NCAA) Division I men's lacrosse. The Cavaliers compete in the Atlantic Coast Conference (ACC) and plays home games at Klöckner Stadium, or occasionally Turf Field or Scott Stadium, in Charlottesville, Virginia. The team is coached by Kevin Cassese, who was named the program's head coach in May 2026.

Virginia won seven NCAA Championships and nine national titles overall. Virginia's 2006 team finished 17–0 after a ACC, and won 16 of its 17 games by four or more goals. Each former Virginia head coach in the NCAA era of men's lacrosse (Dom Starsia, "Ace" Adams, and Glenn Thiel) is among the top 25 of all-time lacrosse coaching wins. Both Tiffany and Starsia moved into the Virginia position after they first achieved success as head coaches at their alma mater Brown University.

Virginia's historic rivalries have extended to the championship matches of six different NCAA Tournaments, with the Cavaliers winning five of those six—defeating Syracuse in 1999, defeating Maryland in 2011 and in 2021, and defeating Johns Hopkins in 1972 and in 2003—while losing just one, in double-overtime, to Hopkins in 1980.

== History ==
University records show that Virginia fielded lacrosse teams from 1904 to 1907, although no further information from that period is available. After a hiatus, lacrosse returned to Charlottesville in 1925 though the team struggled in the ensuing years. Through 1932, the Cavaliers won only one game, while they lost 30 and tied four. Virginia along with Duke, UNC, and Washington & Lee played in the Dixie Lacrosse League from 1938 to 1942 with the Cavaliers winning the championship in the inaugural season. The team was disbanded after the 1932 season and would play sporadically until lacrosse returned for good in 1947. Two years later, Virginia won more games than it lost for the first time in school history when it posted a 7–4 record. The Cavaliers then posted an 8–3 mark in 1950 and 7–2 in 1951. The following season, they recorded an identical tally and the United States Intercollegiate Lacrosse Association (USILA) named Virginia the 1952 co-national champions.

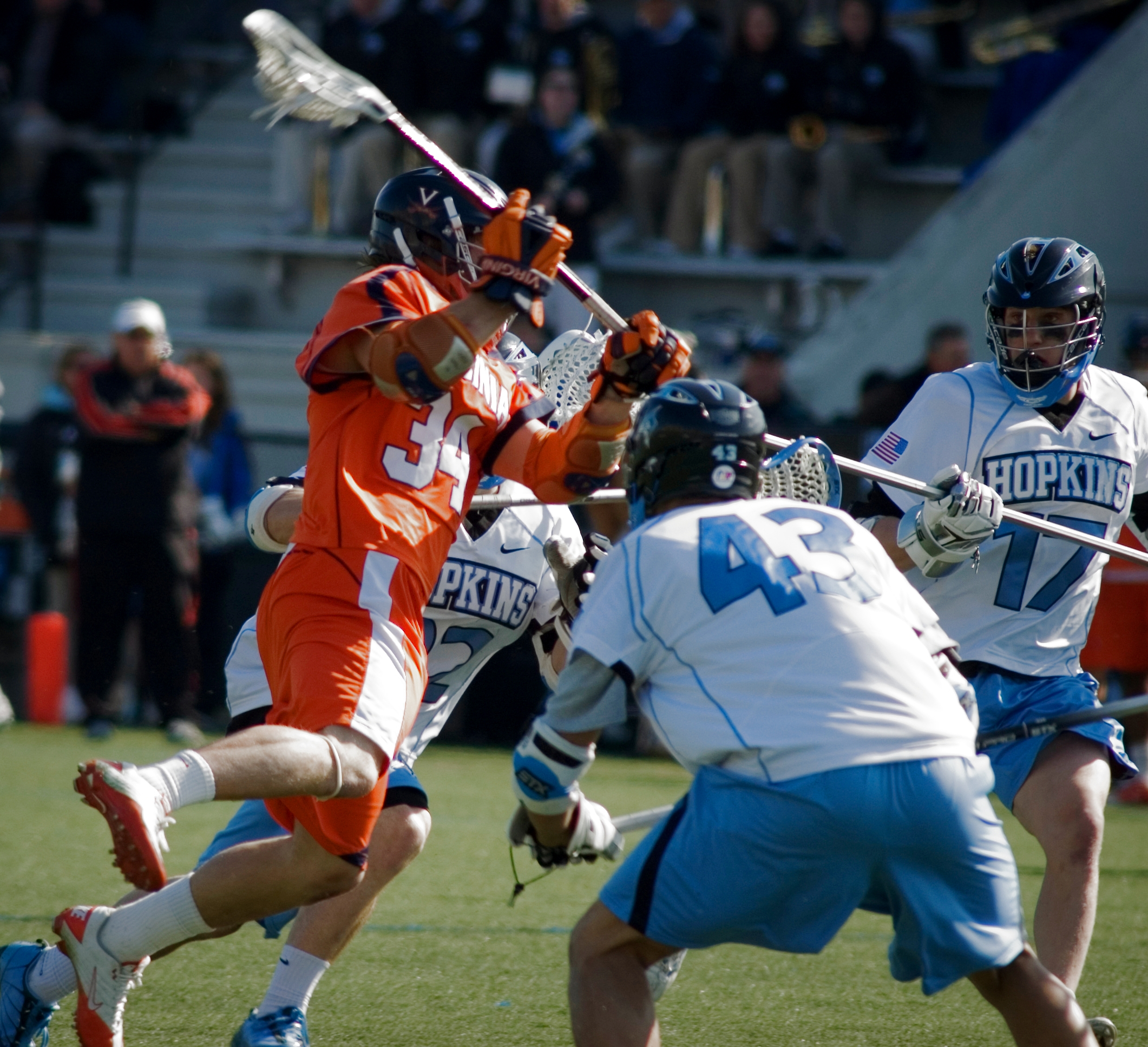
Virginia takes on rival Johns Hopkins

In 1970, Virginia finished the season with an 8–2 record and the USILA again awarded them as co-champions with Navy and Johns Hopkins. The following season, the NCAA instituted a single-elimination tournament to determine the national championship, and the Cavaliers made an appearance but were eliminated by Navy in the first round. In 1972, Virginia again secured a tournament berth, and beat in succession Army, Cortland State, and Johns Hopkins for their first NCAA national championship. In 1978, former Army coach Jim "Ace" Adams took over as head coach, and from that season onward, Virginia has been a regular participant in the NCAA tournament. Since then, the Cavaliers have never failed to qualify in two consecutive seasons. Virginia advanced to the championship game in 1980, 1986, 1994, and 1996, each time falling to the eventual champion by one goal. In 1993, Dom Starsia became head coach, leading the Cavaliers to national titles in 1999, 2003, 2006, and 2011. Since the establishment of an ACC tournament in 1989, Virginia has won the regular-season championship ten times, more than any of the other three teams in the league.

Virginia's 2006 season was remarkable as the Cavaliers became the first team in NCAA history to finish the season with a 17–0 record en route to the program's third national championship in eight years. The team won its games by an average of more than eight goals per game and drew comparisons to some of the best lacrosse teams of all time. The Virginia offense led the nation in scoring (15.28), while the defense ranked 10th, allowing fewer than eight goals per game. Eight Cavaliers were named All-Americans, the most in program history, and senior attackman Matt Ward received the Tewaaraton Trophy as the best player in the nation.

In 2011, the Cavaliers posted a 9–5 regular-season record before entering the NCAA tournament, where they defeated Bucknell, Cornell, Denver, and finally Maryland 9–7 to win their fifth NCAA championship. During the tournament, head coach Dom Starsia became the all-time wins leader in Division I men's lacrosse history, breaking Jack Emmer's previous mark of 326 wins. Five Cavaliers were named USILA All-Americans. Following the tournament, third-year attackman Steele Stanwick won the Tewaaraton Trophy as the nation's top player. Starsia left the program at the conclusion of the 2016 season after a poor run of four seasons that included two losing records – only the program's third and fourth since the NCAA championship era began in 1971.

Brown head coach Lars Tiffany, who had played for Starsia at the college, was named as his replacement on June 21, 2016. In his third season, Tiffany led the Cavaliers to an 17–3 season record, an ACC championship, and back to the 2019 National Championship Game where they defeated Yale, 13–9, to claim their eighth title. After the 2020 season was cancelled due to COVID-19, Tiffany led the 2021 team to a 14–4 season record and the 2021 National Championship Game where they defeated Maryland, 17–16, to retain their title.

== Rivalries ==
Virginia–Syracuse has proven an evenly matched series. Virginia has gained the upper hand in the Johns Hopkins and Maryland rivalries since the 1980s and 1990s, but trails in those all-time series (especially to Johns Hopkins) as a "late blooming" national power.

- Virginia–Syracuse lacrosse rivalry, Syracuse leads 20–18, but Virginia has a 7–3 edge in NCAA Tournaments.
- Virginia–Johns Hopkins lacrosse rivalry, Virginia leads 20–13 since 1994 but trails the overall series 61–32–1.
- Virginia–Maryland lacrosse rivalry, Virginia leads 38–18 since 1980 but trails the overall series 47–46.

== Season results ==
The following is a list of Virginia's results by season as an NCAA Division I program:

Season	Coach	Overall	Conference	Standing	Postseason
Glenn Thiel (Atlantic Coast Conference) (1970–1977)
1971	Glenn Thiel	10–2	2–0	1st	NCAA Division I Quarterfinals
1972	Glenn Thiel	11–4	2–1	2nd	NCAA Division I Champion
1973	Glenn Thiel	10–4	2–1	2nd	NCAA Division I Final Four
1974	Glenn Thiel	5–4	2–1	2nd	NCAA Division I Quarterfinals
1975	Glenn Thiel	7–4	3–0	1st	
1976	Glenn Thiel	5–5	1–2	T–3rd	
1977	Glenn Thiel	7–5	1–1	T–2nd	
Glenn Thiel:		63–30 (.677)	15–6 (.714)		
Jim Adams (Atlantic Coast Conference) (1978–1992)
1978	Jim Adams	6–5	2–2	3rd	NCAA Division I Quarterfinals
1979	Jim Adams	9–4	3–1	2nd	NCAA Division I Final Four
1980	Jim Adams	12–2	3–1	T–1st	NCAA Division I Runner–Up
1981	Jim Adams	9–4	3–1	2nd	NCAA Division I Final Four
1982	Jim Adams	10–3	3–1	2nd	NCAA Division I Final Four
1983	Jim Adams	10–2	3–0	1st	NCAA Division I Quarterfinals
1984	Jim Adams	10–3	3–0	1st	NCAA Division I Quarterfinals
1985	Jim Adams	11–3	2–1	T–1st	NCAA Division I Final Four
1986	Jim Adams	12–3	3–0	1st	NCAA Division I Runner–Up
1987	Jim Adams	6–7	0–3	4th	
1988	Jim Adams	9–5	2–1	2nd	NCAA Division I Final Four
1989	Jim Adams	7–5	1–2	3rd	
1990	Jim Adams	9–5	3–0	1st	NCAA Division I First Round
1991	Jim Adams	10–4	2–1	2nd	NCAA Division I First Round
1992	Jim Adams	7–5	0–3	4th	
Jim Adams:		137–60 (.695)	33–17 (.660)		
Dom Starsia (Atlantic Coast Conference) (1993–2016)
1993	Dom Starsia	10–5	3–0	1st	NCAA Division I Quarterfinals
1994	Dom Starsia	13–4	2–1	T–1st	NCAA Division I Runner–Up
1995	Dom Starsia	12–3	3–0	1st	NCAA Division I Final Four
1996	Dom Starsia	12–4	1–2	T–3rd	NCAA Division I Runner–Up
1997	Dom Starsia	11–3	3–0	1st	NCAA Division I Quarterfinals
1998	Dom Starsia	8–5	2–1	2nd	NCAA Division I Quarterfinals
1999	Dom Starsia	13–3	2–1	T–1st	NCAA Division I Champion
2000	Dom Starsia	13–2	3–0	1st	NCAA Division I Final Four
2001	Dom Starsia	7–7	1–2	T–3rd	NCAA Division I First Round
2002	Dom Starsia	11–4	3–0	1st	NCAA Division I Final Four
2003	Dom Starsia	15–2	2–1	T–1st	NCAA Division I Champion
2004	Dom Starsia	5–8	1–2	3rd	
2005	Dom Starsia	11–4	2–1	2nd	NCAA Division I Final Four
2006	Dom Starsia	17–0	2–0	1st	NCAA Division I Champion
2007	Dom Starsia	12–4	2–1	2nd	NCAA Division I First Round
2008	Dom Starsia	14–4	1–2	3rd	NCAA Division I Final Four
2009	Dom Starsia	15–3	2–1	T–1st	NCAA Division I Final Four
2010	Dom Starsia	16–2	2–1	T–1st	NCAA Division I Final Four
2011	Dom Starsia	13–5	1–2	T–2nd	NCAA Division I Champion
2012	Dom Starsia	12–4	2–1	T–1st	NCAA Division I Quarterfinals
2013	Dom Starsia	7–8	0–3	4th	
2014	Dom Starsia	10–6	1–4	6th	NCAA Division I First Round
2015	Dom Starsia	10–5	0–4	5th	NCAA Division I First Round
2016	Dom Starsia	7–8	0–4	5th	
Dom Starsia:		274–103 (.727)	41–34 (.547)		
Lars Tiffany (Atlantic Coast Conference) (2017–Present)
2017	Lars Tiffany	8–7	0–4	5th	
2018	Lars Tiffany	12–6	1–3	T–4th	NCAA Division I First Round
2019	Lars Tiffany	17–3	3–1	1st	NCAA Division I Champion
2020	Lars Tiffany	4–2	0–0	†	†
2021	Lars Tiffany	14–4	2–4	T–4th	NCAA Division I Champion
2022	Lars Tiffany	12–4	5–1	1st	NCAA Division I Quarterfinals
2023	Lars Tiffany	13–4	4–2	T–2nd	NCAA Division I Final Four
2024	Lars Tiffany	12–6	1–3	T–3rd	NCAA Division I Final Four
2025	Lars Tiffany	6–8	0–4	5th	
2026	Lars Tiffany	10–7	2–2	T–2nd	NCAA Division I First Round
Lars Tiffany:		108–51 (.673)	18–24 (.429)		
Total:		728–405–6 (.641)			
National champion Postseason invitational champion Conference regular season champion Conference regular season and conference tournament champion Division regular season champion Division regular season and conference tournament champion Conference tournament champion

†NCAA canceled spring 2020 collegiate sports due to the COVID-19 pandemic.

== Alumni in the Premier Lacrosse League (10) ==
Year Drafted	Name	Position	Height	Weight	Drafted By	Draft Pick	Current Team	All Star	Accolades
2011	Adam Ghitelman	Goalie	5'9	180	Denver Outlaws (MLL)	8th round (45th overall)	Archers LC	None	None
2011	Thomas Kelly	Faceoff	6'0	215	Undrafted	Undrafted	Chaos LC	None	None
2017	Zed Williams	Attack	6'2	230	Georgia Storm (NLL)	1st round (4th overall)	Whipsnakes LC	2x All Star ('20,'21)	1x MVP ('20), 1x McEneaney ('20)
2018	Scott Hooper	Defense	6'1	180	Charlotte Hounds (MLL)	4th round (28th overall)	Cannons LC	None	None
2019	Ryan Conrad	Midfield	6'0	190	Atlas LC	1st round (2nd overall)	Waterdogs LC	None	None
2021	Jared Conners	LSM	6'5	215	Archers LC	1st round (5th overall)	Archers LC	None	None
2021	Dox Aitken	Midfield	6'2	210	Atlas LC	1st round (8th overall)	Atlas LC	None	None
2021	Charlie Bertrand	Midfield	6'3	220	Redwoods LC	3rd round (24th overall)	Redwoods LC	None	None
2022	Matt Moore	Attack	6'2	195	Archers LC	1st round (4th overall)	Archers LC	None	None
2022	Chris Merle	D Midfield	6'1	200	Undrafted	Undrafted	Archers LC	None	None
