= Dom Starsia =

American lacrosse coach (born 1952)

Biographical details
- Born: April 21, 1952 (age 74); New York, New York, U.S.

Playing career
- 1970–1974: Brown
- Position: Defenseman

Coaching career (HC unless noted)
- 1982–1992: Brown
- 1993–2016: Virginia
- 2019: Chrome L.C.

Accomplishments and honors

Championships
- 2011 NCAA national championship; 2006 NCAA national championship; 2003 NCAA national championship; 1999 NCAA national championship; 2010 ACC championship; 2006 ACC championship; 2003 ACC championship; 2000 ACC championship; 1999 ACC championship; 1997 ACC championship; 1991 Ivy League championship; 1985 Ivy League championship

Awards
- 2011 F. Morris Touchstone "Coach of the Year" Award; 2008 National Lacrosse Hall of Fame Inductee; 2006 Howdy Myers "Man of the Year" Award; 1991 F. Morris Touchstone "Coach of the Year" Award; 1985 F. Morris Touchstone "Coach of the Year" Award

Dom Starsia (born April 21, 1952) is an American lacrosse coach. He is the former head coach of the University of Virginia men's lacrosse program, with whom he won four NCAA national championships, in 1999, 2003, 2006, and 2011. Previously, he served as the head coach of the Brown University lacrosse team where he was twice awarded the F. Morris Touchstone Award as the NCAA Division I lacrosse coach of the year. Starsia was inducted into the National Lacrosse Hall of Fame in 2008. He is currently the head coach for the boys lacrosse team at Blue Ridge School in St. George, Virginia and color commentator for University of Richmond lacrosse games.

== Early life ==
Born in New York City in 1952, Starsia attended Valley Stream Central High School, where he played football at the wide receiver position. In 1970, he enrolled at Brown University, where he again played wide receiver for the varsity football team. Prior to enrolling at Brown, Starsia had never played or seen a lacrosse game. However, he took to the sport naturally and developed into an outstanding defenseman, earning Third Team All America honors in 1973 and 1974 as well as First Team All-Ivy and All-New England honors both years. In 1974, he was captain of the Brown lacrosse team that reached the NCAA playoffs and was selected to play in the annual North-South Senior All-Star Game.

Following college, Starsia was a standout club lacrosse player and was named a club All-American in 1977, 1979, and 1980. He was selected as the Club Defenseman of the Year in 1979. He also played for the U.S. National Team in the 1978 World Lacrosse Championship.

In 1981, Starsia was inducted into the Brown University Athletic Hall of Fame. In 1996, he was inducted into the New England Lacrosse Hall of Fame in Newton, Massachusetts. In 2000, he was named to the Brown Bears men's lacrosse "Team of the Millennium" and was chosen one of Brown's "Top 100 Athletes of the Twentieth Century."

== Coaching career ==
=== Brown University ===
After graduating from Brown in 1974 with a degree in American Civilization, Starsia joined the Brown athletic department. Between 1974 and 1982, he served in a number of different roles at Brown, including head coach of the women's soccer team. In 1982, he became head coach of men's lacrosse and eventually led his alma mater to two Ivy League championships, in 1985 and 1991. In both of these seasons, he was recognized nationally with the F. Morris Touchstone Award as the NCAA Division I lacrosse coach of the year.

=== University of Virginia ===
After spending ten years at Brown, Starsia became the head coach of the Virginia Cavaliers in 1993. There, he coached the Cavaliers to national championships in 1999, 2003, 2006, and 2011. His 2006 team finished with a perfect 17-0 record, a first in NCAA history. During Starsia's tenure at Virginia, the Cavaliers won Atlantic Coast Conference championships in 1997, 1999, 2000, 2003, 2006, and 2010; produced 117 All-Americans including 28 First Team All-Americans; 68 All-ACC selections; eight ACC Rookies of the Year; six ACC Players of the Year; five NCAA Championship MVPs; and 36 All-NCAA Tournament selections. Through 2011, Starsia had compiled a career record of 329 wins and 118 losses in 29 seasons (228-72 at Virginia and 101-46 at Brown), making him the winningest coach in Division I history. Starsia coached all-time greats including Darren Lowe, Doug Knight, Michael Watson, Conor Gill, Jay Jalbert, Tillman Johnson, Matt Ward, and Ben Rubeor.

In 2006, Starsia received the Howdy Myers Man of the Year Award at the annual USILA convention. Two years later, in 2008, he was inducted into the Lacrosse National Hall of Fame by US Lacrosse. Following Virginia's 2011 national championship season, Starsia was also nominated for an ESPY Award for Best Coach/Manager.

Starsia left the Virginia program at the conclusion of the 2016 season after a poor run of four seasons that included two losing records – only the program's third and fourth since the NCAA championship era began in 1971 – and a 1–15 mark in ACC play. At the time, media outlets reported Starsia had been fired. In a 2018 interview with The Daily Progress, Starsia recounted that then-athletic director Craig Littlepage indeed told him the day after the 2016 season concluded that the university was not extending his contract, which expired at the end of the calendar year, and gave him an opportunity to resign. Starsia countered that he retained the confidence of players and alumni and asked for a five-month extension to coach the 2017 season, after which he would resign if Littlepage remained unsatisfied with the team's results. According to Starsia, Littlepage agreed to this weeks later after heavy pressure from alumni and boosters, at which point Starsia declined it and resigned due to the perceived lack of respect.

=== Chrome Lacrosse Club ===
In February 2019, Starsia was introduced as the head coach for the Chrome Lacrosse Club of the Premier Lacrosse League.

=== Blue Ridge School ===
On November 12, 2020, Starsia was announced as the new head coach of the boys lacrosse team at the Blue Ridge School in St. George, Virginia.

== Personal life ==
Married with four children, Starsia has three daughters and one son. His son Joe is a former assistant lacrosse coach at the University of Virginia.

== See also ==
- List of college men's lacrosse coaches with 250 wins
