= 2010 NCAA Division III men's lacrosse tournament =

North American field lacrosse tournament

2010 NCAA Division III Men's Lacrosse Championship
Tournament information
- Sport: College lacrosse
- Location: United States
- Dates: May 12, 2010–May 30, 2010
- Venue(s): M&T Bank Stadium; Baltimore, MD
- Participants: 23

Final positions
- Champions: Tufts (1st title)
- Runner-up: Salisbury

Tournament statistics
- Matches played: 22
- Attendance: 35,376 (1,608 per match)
- MVP: D.J. Hessler (Tufts)
- Top scorer: D.J. Hessler (Tufts)

The 2010 NCAA Division III men's lacrosse tournament was held from May 12 through May 30, 2010. It was the 31st annual Division III NCAA Men's Lacrosse Championship tournament. Sixteen NCAA Division III college men's lacrosse teams met after having played their way through a regular season, and for some, a play-in game to advance to the tournament.

The tournament culminated on Memorial Day weekend at M&T Bank Stadium in Baltimore, Maryland. That venue also hosted the Division I and Division II championships. The Division III championship game took place on May 30, as a doubleheader with the Division II final, and pitted perennial Division III powerhouse Salisbury against final newcomer Tufts University. It was Salisbury's eleventh championship game appearance under head coach Jim Berkman. Tufts controlled the game throughout on its way to upset Salisbury, 9–6. It was Tufts University's first NCAA championship in any sport.

== Play-in games ==
The final four rounds of the tournament were preceded by six play-in games on May 12:

- Keene State 21 – Castleton State 7
- Middlebury 10 – Goucher 6
- Endicott 8 – Montclair State 6
- Springfield 7 – Widener 1
- Dickinson 7 – Ohio Wesleyan 3
- Roanoke 15 – Wittenberg 4
- Cabrini 10 – Denison 7

== Tournament results ==
Second Round; May 15
N1	Cortland	18
Keene State	6
N4	Connecticut C.	9
RIT	11
N3	Middlebury	16
RPI	8
N2	Tufts	21
Endicott	8
S1	Salisbury	17
S15	Springfield	4
S4	Haverford	13
Dickinson	5
S3	Gettysburg	10
Roanoke	11*
S2	Stevenson	19
Cabrini	9

Quarterfinals; May 19
N1	Cortland	15
RIT	7
N3	Middlebury	9
N2	Tufts	11
S1	Salisbury	12*
S4	Haverford	11
Roanoke	14
S2	Stevenson	15*

Semifinals; May 23
N1	Cortland	9
N2	Tufts	10
S1	Salisbury	14*
S2	Stevenson	13

Final; May 30
N2	Tufts	9
S1	Salisbury	6

- * = Overtime

== See also ==
- 2010 NCAA Division III women's lacrosse tournament
- 2010 NCAA Division I men's lacrosse tournament
- 2010 NCAA Division II men's lacrosse tournament
