= 2006 NCAA Division I men's lacrosse tournament =

- Dates: May 13–29, 2006
- Teams: 16
- Finals site: Lincoln Financial Field; Philadelphia, Pennsylvania
- Champions: Virginia (4th title)
- Runner-up: Massachusetts (1st title game)
- Semifinalists: Maryland (19th Final Four); Syracuse (23rd Final Four)
- Winning coach: Dom Starsia (3rd title)
- MOP: Matt Ward, Virginia
- Attendance: 49,562 semi-finals 47,062 finals 96,624 total
- Top scorer: Matt Ward, Virginia (22 goals)

The 2006 NCAA Division I lacrosse tournament was the 36th annual tournament hosted by the National Collegiate Athletic Association to determine the team champion of men's college lacrosse among its Division I programs, held at the end of the 2006 NCAA Division I men's lacrosse season.

Virginia won the national title with a 15–7 win over Massachusetts. The Cavaliers, led by Matt Ward and Ben Rubeor, completed a perfect 17-0 record and won their fourth NCAA championship and sixth overall national lacrosse title. The Minutemen became the second unseeded team to make the NCAA final (Towson State also accomplished this in 1991).

The semifinals and the championship game were played at Lincoln Financial Field, the home of the NFL's Philadelphia Eagles, in Philadelphia, Pennsylvania, with a crowd of 47,062 fans in attendance.

== Qualifying ==
Sixteen NCAA Division I college men's lacrosse teams met after having played their way through a regular season, and for some, a conference tournament.

Denver made their debut appearance in the Division I men's lacrosse tournament.

== Bracket ==
First Round; May 13–14, 2006
1	Virginia	14
Notre Dame	10
Navy	7
8	Georgetown	9
5	Syracuse	11
Harvard	4
Penn	3
4	Johns Hopkins	13
3	Hofstra	14
Providence	8
Massachusetts	10
6	Cornell	9
7	Princeton	11
UMBC	8
Denver	8
2	Maryland	16

Quarterfinals; May 20–21, 2006
1	Virginia	20
8	Georgetown	8
5	Syracuse	13
4	Johns Hopkins	12
Massachusetts	11*
3	Hofstra	10
7	Princeton	6
2	Maryland	11

Semifinals; May 27, 2006
1	Virginia	17
5	Syracuse	10
Massachusetts	8
2	Maryland	5

Final; May 29, 2006
1	Virginia	15
Massachusetts	7

- * = Overtime

== See also ==
- 2006 NCAA Division I women's lacrosse tournament
- 2006 NCAA Division II men's lacrosse tournament
- 2006 NCAA Division III men's lacrosse tournament
