= 2003 NCAA Division I men's lacrosse tournament =

- Teams: 16
- Finals site: M&T Bank Stadium, Baltimore, Maryland
- Champions: Virginia (3rd title)
- Runner-up: Johns Hopkins (15th title game)
- Semifinalists: Maryland (17th Final Four); Syracuse (21st Final Four)
- Winning coach: Dom Starsia (2nd title)
- MOP: Tillman Johnson, Virginia
- Attendance: 37,823 semi-finals 37,944 finals 75,767 total
- Top scorer: Kevin Boland, Johns Hopkins (15 goals)

The 2003 NCAA Division I lacrosse tournament was the 33rd annual tournament hosted by the National Collegiate Athletic Association to determine the team champion of men's college lacrosse among its Division I programs, held at the end of the 2003 NCAA Division I men's lacrosse season.

Virginia won the championship with a 9–7 win over top-ranked Johns Hopkins. The Cavaliers, led by A.J. Shannon, Chris Rotelli and Matt Ward, won their third NCAA championship.

Virginia was able to hang to an 8–5 lead to close out the 3rd quarter. Rotelli led all scorers with one goal and four assists in the finals for the Cavaliers, while Kyle Barrie led Johns Hopkins with one goal and one assist. Virginia goalie Tillman Johnson was the unsung hero of the contest, with 13 saves in the game for a .650 save percentage. He was named the Most Outstanding Player for this tournament. Virginia closed out the season with a 15-2 record, and Johnson closed out his career as Virginia's all-time leader in saves with 204.

The championship game was played at M&T Bank Stadium, the home of the NFL's Baltimore Ravens, in Baltimore, Maryland in front of 37,944 fans.

== Qualifying ==
Sixteen NCAA Division I college men's lacrosse teams met after having played their way through a regular season, and for some, a conference tournament.

Albany, Dartmouth, Mount St. Mary's, Ohio State, and Penn State made their debut appearances in the Division I men's lacrosse tournament.

== Bracket ==
First Round
1	Johns Hopkins	14
Army	2
8	Towson	11
Penn State	6
5	Syracuse	13
Dartmouth	11
Albany	10
4	Princeton	16
3	Maryland	8
Ohio State	5
6	Massachusetts	9
Hofstra	6
7	Rutgers	6
Georgetown	9
Mount St. Mary's	8
2	Virginia	19

Quarterfinals
1	Johns Hopkins	14
8	Towson	6
5	Syracuse	15
4	Princeton	5
3	Maryland	13
6	Massachusetts	7
Georgetown	7
2	Virginia	12

Semifinals
1	Johns Hopkins	19
5	Syracuse	8
3	Maryland	4
2	Virginia	14

Final
1	Johns Hopkins	7
2	Virginia	9

- * = Overtime

== See also ==
- 2003 NCAA Division I women's lacrosse tournament
- 2003 NCAA Division II men's lacrosse tournament
- 2003 NCAA Division III men's lacrosse tournament
