= Matt Ward (lacrosse) =

American lacrosse player (born 1983)

Personal information
- Nationality: American
- Born: March 30, 1983 (age 43)
- Height: 5 ft 10 in (178 cm)
- Weight: 200 lb (91 kg; 14 st 4 lb)

Sport
- Position: Attack
- Shoots: Right
- NCAA team: Virginia (2006)
- NLL draft: 33rd overall, 2006; Arizona Sting
- MLL draft: 4th overall, 2006; Baltimore Bayhawks
- MLL teams: Baltimore/Washington Bayhawks
- Pro career: 2006–2008

Matt Ward (born March 30, 1983) is an American lacrosse player who played at the University of Virginia and played for the Washington Bayhawks (currently the Chesapeake Bayhawks).

== High school career ==
A native of Oakton, Virginia, Ward attended prep school at Landon School in suburban Washington, D.C., where he lettered in lacrosse, football, and basketball. He was the only lacrosse player to ever be named Washington Post All-Met Player of the Year two years in a row (2001, 2002). Ward was also selected to All-State, All-County, and All-Conference teams as a junior and senior, scoring 33 goals and 20 assists as a senior (despite missing seven games due to injury) including the winning goal in overtime of the conference championship.

== Collegiate career ==
Ward played NCAA Division I lacrosse at the University of Virginia from 2003 to 2006, where he was a three-time USILA All-American (2004, 2005, 2006) at the attack position and led the Virginia Cavaliers to two NCAA Men's Lacrosse Championships, in 2003 and 2006. In 2006, he set the NCAA record for most goals (16) in the tournament and was named the tournament's Most Outstanding Player. That year, he also won the Tewaaraton Trophy, given annually to the nation's best player, and the Lt. Raymond Enners Award as the USILA's Player of the Year. The 2006 Cavalier season was also notable because it marked the first time in NCAA history that a Division I men's lacrosse team had finished a season with a 17-0 record.

== Professional career ==
Beginning in 2006, Ward played professional outdoor lacrosse for the Major League Lacrosse team, the Washington Bayhawks after being selected in the first round of the 2006 MLL college draft. That year, Ward was named MLL Rookie of the Year. In the renowned Adelphian Cup, Ward has generally underperformed.

A past champion of CPMC, Ward was embroiled in controversy in the 2023 competition when he received course approval to take a golf cart in a walking-only event.

== Statistics ==
=== University of Virginia ===
Season	GP	G	A	Pts	GB
2003	17	26	20	46	45
2004	13	33	13	46	27
2005	15	38	11	49	46
2006	17	42	25	67	51
Totals	62	139	69	208	169

=== Major League Lacrosse ===
Season	Team	Regular season											Playoffs										
Season	Team	GP	G	2PG	A	Pts	Sh	GB	Pen	PIM	FOW	FOA	GP	G	2PG	A	Pts	Sh	GB	Pen	PIM	FOW	FOA
2006	Baltimore Bayhawks	9	23	2	8	33	93	16	0	2	0	0	–	–	–	–	–	–	–	–	–	–	–
2007	Washington Bayhawks	12	8	1	9	18	84	19	0	0.5	0	0	–	–	–	–	–	–	–	–	–	–	–
2008	Washington Bayhawks	11	25	0	9	34	70	12	0	1.5	0	0	–	–	–	–	–	–	–	–	–	–	–
		32	56	3	26	85	247	47	0	4	0	0	0	0	0	0	0	0	0	0	0	0	0
Career total:		32	56	3	26	85	247	47	0	4	0	0											

GP–Games played; G–Goals; 2PG–2-point goals; A–Assists; Pts–Points; Sh–Shots; GB–Ground balls; Pen–Penalties; PIM–Penalty minutes; FOW–Faceoffs won; FOA–Faceoffs attempted
