= Colin Briggs =

American lacrosse player

Personal information
- Nickname: The Rigg
- Born: March 6, 1989 (age 37) Narrgansett, Rhode Island, United States
- Height: 6 ft 0 in (183 cm)
- Weight: 200 lb (91 kg; 14 st 4 lb)

Sport
- Position: Midfield
- MLL team Former teams: Boston Cannons; Denver Outlaws, Charlotte Hounds
- team: University of Virginia

Colin Briggs is a current professional lacrosse player for the Boston Cannons of the MLL. He was an All-ACC midfielder for the University of Virginia Cavaliers and was named the Most Outstanding Player of the 2011 NCAA Tournament. He was originally drafted 6th overall in the 2012 MLL Collegiate Draft by the Denver Outlaws.
