= 2024 NCAA Division I men's lacrosse tournament =

Lacrosse tournament in Philadelphia

- Dates: May 11–27, 2024
- Teams: 17
- Finals site: Lincoln Financial Field, Philadelphia, Pennsylvania
- Champions: Notre Dame (2nd title)
- Runner-up: Maryland (17th title game)
- Semifinalists: Denver (6th Final Four); Virginia (26th Final Four)

The 2024 NCAA Division I Men's Lacrosse Championship was the 53rd annual single-elimination tournament to determine the national championship for NCAA Division I men's college lacrosse. The semifinals and final were hosted by Drexel University and held at Lincoln Financial Field in Philadelphia, Pennsylvania.

== Format ==
Seventeen (17) teams competed in the tournament based upon their performance during the regular season. For nine (9) conferences, entry into the tournament was by means of a conference tournament automatic qualifier, while for ACC teams and the remaining eight (8) teams, at-large selection was determined by the NCAA selection committee.

== Teams ==
Seed	School	Conference	Berth Type	RPI	Record
1	Notre Dame Fighting Irish	ACC	At-large	1	12–1
2	Duke Blue Devils	ACC	At-large	2	12–5
3	Johns Hopkins Blue Jays	Big Ten	At-large	3	10–4
4	Syracuse Orange	ACC	At-large	4	11–5
5	Denver Pioneers	Big East	At-large	6	11–3
6	Virginia Cavaliers	ACC	At-large	5	10–5
7	Maryland Terrapins	Big Ten	At-large	7	8–5
8	Georgetown Hoyas	Big East	Automatic	10	12–3
	Penn State Nittany Lions	Big Ten	At-large	9	11–4
	Princeton Tigers	Ivy League	Automatic	8	11–4
	Saint Joseph's Hawks	Atlantic 10	Automatic	15	12–3
	Michigan Wolverines	Big Ten	Automatic	13	10–6
	Towson Tigers	CAA	Automatic	16	13–3
	Lehigh Mountain Hawks	Patriot League	Automatic	21	10–6
	Utah Utes	ASUN	Automatic	24	12–4
	Albany Great Danes	America East	Automatic	36	9–7
	Sacred Heart Pioneers	MAAC	Automatic	32	13–4

== Bracket ==
Play–in game May 8 Albany, NY
Albany	13
Sacred Heart	7

First round May 11–12, ESPNU; Hosted by seeded team
1	Notre Dame	14
Albany	9
8	Georgetown	12
Penn State	9
5	Denver	16
Michigan	11
4	Syracuse	20
Towson	15
3	Johns Hopkins	13
Lehigh	10
6	Virginia	17
Saint Joseph's	11
7	Maryland	16
Princeton	8
2	Duke	19
Utah	7

Quarterfinals; May 18–19, ESPNU; Hempstead, NY and Towson, MD
1	Notre Dame	16
8	Georgetown	11
5	Denver	10
4	Syracuse	8
3	Johns Hopkins	10
6	Virginia	11*
7	Maryland	14
2	Duke	11

Semifinals; May 25, ESPN2; Philadelphia, PA
1	Notre Dame	13
5	Denver	6
6	Virginia	6
7	Maryland	12

National Championship; May 27, ESPN; Philadelphia, PA
1	Notre Dame	15
7	Maryland	5

* denotes overtime period

== Tournament Boxscores ==
=== Finals ===
Team	1	2	3	4	Total
Notre Dame	5	5	4	1	15
Maryland (11–7)	3	1	1	0	5
Notre Dame scoring: Chris Kavanagh 5, Jake Taylor 2, Max Busenkell, Eric Dobson, Will Angrick, Fisher Finley, Reilly Gray, Devon McLane, Jalen Seymour, Jordan Faison; Maryland scoring: Daniel Kelly 2, Eric Malever, Jack Koras, Ryan Siracusa; Shots: Notre Dame 42, Maryland 35; Saves: Notre Dame Liam Entenmann 16, Maryland Logan McNaney 15; Attendance: 31,479 – 5/27/2024 Philadelphia, Pa. (Lincoln Financial Field)

=== Semifinals ===
Team	1	2	3	4	Total
Maryland	4	3	4	1	12
Virginia (12–6)	1	2	1	2	6
Maryland scoring: Daniel Kelly 3, Eric Spanos 2, Daniel Maltz 2, Jack Koras, Ryan Siracusa, Colin Burlace, Jack Brennan, Luke Wierman; Virginia scoring: McCabe Millon 2, Connor Shellenberger, Joey Terenzi, Payton Cormier, Noah Chizmar; Shots: Virginia 37, Maryland 39; Saves: Virginia Kyle Morris 5 – Matthew Nunes 0, Maryland Logan McNaney 8, Westin Schmidt 1; Attendance: 32,269 – 5/25/2024 at Philadelphia, Pa. (Lincoln Financial)

Team	1	2	3	4	Total
Notre Dame	3	2	4	4	13
Denver (13–4)	1	3	1	1	6
Notre Dame scoring: Pat Kavanagh 3, Chris Kavanagh 3, Devon McLane 3, Eric Dobson, Nick Harris, Jake Taylor, Jordan Faison; Denver scoring: Richie Connell 2, Michael Lampert 2, Joshua Carlson, Stephen Avery; Shots: Notre Dame 35, Denver 30; Saves: Notre Dame Liam Entenmann 12, Denver Malcolm Kleban 10; Attendance: 32,269 – 5/25/2024 at Philadelphia, Pa. (Lincoln Financial)

=== Quarterfinals ===
Team	1	2	3	4	OT1	OT2	Total
Virginia	3	2	2	3	0	1	11
Johns Hopkins (11–5)	5	2	3	0	0	0	10
Virginia scoring: Connor Shellenberger 3, McCabe Millon 3, Jack Boyden 3, Ryan Colsey, Payton Cormier; Johns Hopkins scoring: Russell Melendez 4, Garrett Degnon 3, Quintan Kilrain, Jacob Angelus, Johnathan Peshko; Shots: Virginia 50, Johns Hopkins 36; Saves: Johns Hopkins – Chayse Ierlan 15, Virginia – Matthew Nunes 1, Kyle Morris 8; Attendance: 9,642 – 5/19/2024 at Towson, Md. (Unitas Stadium)

Team	1	2	3	4	Total
Maryland	1	4	2	7	14
Duke (13–6)	5	3	1	2	11
Maryland scoring: Daniel Maltz 4, Ryan Siracusa 3, Braden Erksa 2, Jack Koras 2, Luke Wierman 2, Jack Brennan; Duke scoring: Dyson Williams 6, Brennan O'Neill 3, Charles Balsamo, Max Sloat; Shots: Maryland 39, Duke 28; Saves: Maryland – Logan McNaney 11, Duke – Patrick Jameison 8; Attendance: 9,086 – 5/18/2024 at Hempstead, New York (James M. Shuart)

Team	1	2	3	4	Total
Notre Dame	3	4	4	5	16
Georgetown (13–4)	1	1	2	7	11
Notre Dame scoring: Chris Kavanagh 5, Pat Kavanagh 3, Devon McLane 2, Fulton Bayman, Eric Dobson, Reilly Gray, Marco Napolitano, Jordan Faison, Will Lynch; Georgetown scoring: Graham Bundy Jr. 5, Alexander Vardaro 2, Jack Schubert 2, Aidan Carroll, Chase Llewellyn; Shots: Notre Dame 44, Georgetown 33; Saves: Notre Dame – Liam Entenmann 8, Georgetown – Anderson Moore 8; Attendance: Unknown – 5/18/2024 at Hempstead, New York (James M. Shuart)

Team	1	2	3	4	Total
Denver	3	1	6	0	10
Syracuse (12–6)	2	1	2	3	8
Denver scoring: Michael Lampert 2, JJ Sillstrop 2, Ty Hussey 2, Cody Malawsky 2, Joshua Carlson, Mic Kelly; Syracuse scoring: Michael Leo 3, Sam English 2, Owen Hiltz, Finn Thomson, Jake Stevens; Shots: Denver 38, Syracuse 36; Saves: Denver – Malcolm Kleban 10, Syracuse – Will Mark 9; Attendance: Unknown – 5/19/2024 at Towson, Md. (Unitas Stadium)

=== First Round ===
Team	1	2	3	4	Total
Notre Dame	3	3	2	5	14
Albany (10–8)	1	2	2	2	9
Notre Dame scoring: Devon McLane 4, Pat Kavanagh 3, Jake Taylor 3, Chris Kavanagh, Reilly Gray, Jordan Faison, Max Busenkell; Albany scoring: Ryan Doherty 3, Silas Richmond, Graydon Hogg, Amos Whitcomb, Ben Wimmer, Jackson Palumb, Parker Emmett; Shots: Notre Dame 34, Albany 31; Saves: Notre Dame – Liam Entenmann 8, Albany – Landon Whitney 10; Attendance: – 5/12/2024 at Notre Dame, I.N. (Arlotta Stadium)

Team	1	2	3	4	Total
Georgetown	3	3	2	5	12
Penn State (11–5)	1	2	2	2	9
Georgetown scoring: Jordan Wray 4, Jack Schubert 3, Patrick Crogan 2, Graham Bundy Jr., Aidan Carroll, Ty Banks; Penn State scoring: Matt Traynor 3, TJ Malone 2, Luke Walstrum 2, Sean Donnelly, Luke Mercer; Shots: Georgetown 48, Penn State 39; Saves: Penn State [ Jack Fracyon 13, Georgetown – Anderson Moore 9; Attendance: 2,532 – 5/12/2024 at Washington, D.C. (Cooper Field)

Team	1	2	3	4	Total
Syracuse	5	3	9	3	20
Towson (13–4)	6	3	1	5	15
Syracuse scoring: Joey Spallina 4, Owen Hiltz 4, Jake Stevens 3, Michael Leo 2, Finn Thomson 2, Luke Rhoa, Jackson Birtwistle, Sam English, John Mullen, Mason Kohn; Towson scoring: Alex Roussel 4, Mike Weisshaar 3, Josh Webber 3, Bode Maurer 3, Chop Gallagher; Shots: Syracuse 46, Towson 34; Saves: Syracuse – Will Mark 10, Towson – Luke Downs 9; Attendance: 3,167 – 5/12/2024 at Syracuse University (JMA Wireless Dome)

Team	1	2	3	4	Total
Johns Hopkins	2	3	3	5	13
Lehigh (10–7)	2	2	3	3	10
Johns Hopkins scoring: Matt Collison 4, Jacob Angelus 2, Garrett Degnon 2, Johnathan Peshko 2, Dylan Bauer, Scott V. Smith, Casey McDermott; Lehigh scoring: Quinn Armstrong 3, Andrew Kelly 3, Scott Cole 2, Aidan Decker, Grant Rodny; Shots: Lehigh 38, Johns Hopkins 36; Saves: Lehigh – Nick Pecora 13, Johns Hopkins – Chayse Ierlan 10; Attendance: 1,469 – 5/12/2024 at Baltimore, MD (Homewood Field)

Team	1	2	3	4	Total
Virginia	6	5	5	1	17
Saint Joseph's (12–4)	4	2	2	3	11
Virginia scoring: Payton Cormier 8, Connor Shellenberger 2, Griffin Schutz 2, Joey Terenzi, McCabe Millon, Ryan Colsey, Jack Boyden, Noah Chizmar; Saint Joseph's scoring: Carter Page 3, Jesse Jason 2, Toron Eccleston 2, Collin Campbell, Levi Anderson, Mark Watters, Colin Reich; Shots: Virginia 48, Saint Joseph's 29; Saves: Saint Joseph's Tommy Gross 12, Virginia Matthew Nunes 11 – Kyle Morris 0; Attendance: 2,063 – 5/11/2024 at Charlottesville, VA (Klockner Stadium)

Team	1	2	3	4	Total
Maryland	4	7	1	4	16
Princeton (11–5)	1	2	3	2	8
Maryland scoring: Eric Spanos 4, Eric Malever 3, Jack Koras 3, Daniel Maltz 2, Daniel Kelly 2, Ryan Siracusa, Owen Murphy; Princeton scoring: Nate Kabiri 3, Colin Burns, Tucker Wade, Marquez White, Lukas Stanat, Coulter Mackesy; Shots: Maryland 37, Princeton 31; Saves: Maryland – Logan McNaney 11, Westin Schmidt 0, Princeton – Michael Gianforcaro 9; Attendance: 3,195 – 5/11/2024 at College Park, MD (SECU Stadium)

Team	1	2	3	4	Total
Denver	7	3	3	3	16
Michigan (10–7)	1	2	5	3	11
Denver scoring: Mic Kelly 3, JJ Sillstrop 3, Cody Malawsky 3, Casey Wilson 2, Richie Connell 2, Michael Lampert, Daniel Clark, Ty Hussey; Michigan scoring: Justin Tiernan 4, Ryan Cohen 3, Michael Boehm, Aidan Mulholland, John Morgan, Cathal Roberts; Shots: Denver 41, Michigan 41; Saves: Denver – Malcolm Kleban 10, Michigan – Hunter Taylor 8; Attendance: Unknown – 5/11/2024 at Denver, CO (Peter Barton Stadium)

Team	1	2	3	4	Total
Duke	7	4	5	3	19
Utah (12–5)	2	3	2	0	7
Duke scoring: Dyson Williams 5, Josh Zawada 4, Brennan O'Neill 2, Aidan Danenza 2, Andrew McAdorey 2, Benn Johnston, Jake Naso, Max Sloat, Tyler Carpenter; Utah scoring: Tyler Bradbury 2, Jordan Hyde 2, Ryan Stines, Cody Hart, Jared Andreala; Shots: Duke 36, Utah 39; Saves: Duke – Patrick Jameison 11, Utah – Colin Lenskold 5; Attendance: Unknown – 5/11/2024 at Durham, NC (Koskinen Stadium)

=== Play In ===
Team	1	2	3	4	Total
Albany	3	3	2	5	13
Sacred Heart (13–5)	1	2	2	2	7
Albany scoring: Silas Richmond 4, Alex Pfeiffer 4, Ryan Doherty 2, Daniel Kesselring, Jackson Palumb, Grayden Hogg; Sacred Heart scoring: Tucker Spencer 3, Jake Ward, Carson Spooner, John Murray, Will Moulton; Shots: Albany 36, Marist 36; Saves: Sacred Heart Alex Pazienza 13, Albany Landon Whitney 12; Attendance: 1,485 – 5/8/2024 at Albany, N.Y. (Casey Stadium)

== Record by conference ==
Conference	# of Bids	Record	Win %	PG	R16	QF	SF	CG	NC
ACC	4	8–3	.727	–	4	4	2	1	1
Big Ten	4	4–4	.500	–	4	2	1	1	–
Big East	2	3–2	.600	–	2	2	1	–	–
America East	1	1–1	.500	1	1	–	–	–	–
ASUN	1	0–1	.000	–	1	–	–	–	–
Atlantic 10	1	0–1	.000	–	1	–	–	–	–
CAA	1	0–1	.000	–	1	–	–	–	–
Ivy League	1	0–1	.000	–	1	–	–	–	–
Patriot	1	0–1	.000	–	1	–	–	–	–
MAAC	1	0–1	.000	1	–	–	–	–	–

== All-Tournament Team ==
Chris Kavanagh, A, Notre Dame: Most Outstanding Player
Pat Kavanagh, A, Notre Dame
Connor Shellenberger, A, Virginia
Daniel Kelly, A, Maryland
Devon McLane, M, Notre Dame
Ben Ramsey, SSDM, Notre Dame
Luke Wierman, FO, Maryland
Ajax Zappitello, D, Maryland
Shawn Lyght, D, Notre Dame
Liam Entenmann, G, Notre Dame

== See also ==
- NCAA Division II men's lacrosse tournament
- NCAA Division III men's lacrosse tournament
- 2024 NCAA Division I women's lacrosse tournament
