= 1986 NCAA Division I men's lacrosse tournament =

- Teams: 10
- Finals site: Delaware Stadium, Newark, Delaware
- Champions: North Carolina (3rd title)
- Runner-up: Virginia (3rd title game)
- Semifinalists: Johns Hopkins (14th Final Four); Syracuse (5th Final Four)
- Winning coach: Willie Scroggs (3rd title)
- MOP: Gary Seivold, North Carolina
- Attendance: 9,765 finals 31,340 total
- Top scorers: Tom Korrie, Syracuse; Gary Seivold, North Carolina (12 goals)

The 1986 NCAA Division I lacrosse tournament was the 16th annual tournament hosted by the National Collegiate Athletic Association to determine the team champion of men's college lacrosse among its Division I programs, held at the end of the 1986 NCAA Division I men's lacrosse season.

Fifth-seeded North Carolina capped off an 11-3 season with its third NCAA championship, upsetting Virginia in the final, 10–9 in overtime.

The championship game was played at Delaware Stadium at the University of Delaware in Newark, Delaware with 9,765 fans in attendance.

== Overview ==
Gary Seivold, who scored the game winner in overtime had two goals and two assists for North Carolina. Seivold's goal with 2:10 left in overtime gave Carolina the 10–9 victory over Virginia. Virginia's Will Rosebro had tied the game at nine with 1:05 left in the fourth quarter. Seivold led all tournament scorers with 12 goals and was named the tournament's outstanding player.

This tournament was notable because for the first time in nine seasons Johns Hopkins was not in the tournament finals, having been upset in overtime by North Carolina. The tournament was also notable for the expansion in the tournament format to ten teams, from eight with two play-in games.

== Bracket ==
First Round
8	Massachusetts	16
New Hampshire	6
7	Rutgers	13
C.W. Post	8

Quarterfinals
1	Johns Hopkins	13
8	Massachusetts	6
5	North Carolina	12
4	Maryland	10
3	Virginia	12
6	Navy	9
2	Syracuse	17
7	Rutgers	5

Semifinals
1	Johns Hopkins	9
5	North Carolina	10^{(i)}
3	Virginia	12
2	Syracuse	10

Final
5	North Carolina	10^{(i)}
3	Virginia	9

- ^{(i)} one overtime

== Box scores ==
=== Finals ===
Team	1	2	3	4	OT1	Total
North Carolina	1	4	2	2	1	10
Virginia	1	3	4	1	0	9
North Carolina scoring – Gary Seivold 2, Pat Welsh 2, Robby Russell 2, Chris Galgano, John Szczypinski, Ted Brown, Rich Crawford; Virginia scoring – Roddy Marino 2, Will Rosebro 2, John Gillin, Rich Reda, John Begier, Jeff Nicklas, Chase Monroe; Shots: North Carolina 40, Virginia 39; Saves: Virginia 17, North Carolina 11

=== Semifinals ===
Team	1	2	3	4	OT1	Total
North Carolina	4	1	0	4	1	10
Johns Hopkins	3	4	1	1	0	9
North Carolina scoring - Pat Welsh 3, Rich Crawford 2, Ted Brown, James Koester, Chris Galgano, Kevin Haus, Mike Tummillo; Johns Hopkins scoring – Mike Morrill 3, Craig Bubier 2, Brian Wood, Larry Ledoyen, Steve Mitchell, Pat Russell; Shots: Johns Hopkins 49, North Carolina 34; Saves: North Carolina 13, Johns Hopkins 10

Team	1	2	3	4	Total
Virginia	3	2	6	1	12
Syracuse	2	4	2	2	10
Virginia scoring – Jeff Nicklas 3, Ed Harney 2, Roddy Marino 2, Mike Meyer, Will Rosebro, Doug Amacher, Rich Reda, Mark Altemus; Syracuse scoring – John Zulberti 3, Tom Korrie 3, Eric Jeschke, Todd Curry, Pat Donahue, Tom Nelson; Shots: Virginia 36, Syracuse 33; Saves: Syracuse 11, Virginia 11

=== Quarterfinals ===
Team	1	2	3	4	Total
Johns Hopkins	4	2	5	2	13
Massachusetts	0	4	2	0	6
Johns Hopkins scoring – Del Dressel 4, Brian Wood 4, Mike Morrill 2, Craig Bubier, Chris Schreiber, Geoff Nordberg; Massachusetts scoring – Patrick Cain 2, Tom Carmean 2, Greg Canella, Douglas Musco; Shots: Johns Hopkins 63, Massachusetts 34; Saves: Massachusetts 29, Johns Hopkins 13

Team	1	2	3	4	Total
North Carolina	5	2	1	4	12
Maryland	2	1	4	3	10
North Carolina scoring – Gary Seivold 3, Pat Welsh 2, Mike Tummillo, Mark Tummillo, Robbie Russell, Ted Brown, Chris Walker, Brett Davy, John Szczypinski.; Maryland scoring – Kirk Thurston 3, Tom Worstel 2, Allen McGuckian 2, Mike Mosko 2, Brian Willard; Shots: Maryland 40, North Carolina 30; Saves: North Carolina 15, Maryland 8

Team	1	2	3	4	Total
Virginia	0	5	3	4	12
Navy	2	0	5	2	9
Virginia scoring – Roddy Marino 3, Jeff Nicklas 3, Will Rosebro 2, Mark Altemus, Chase Monroe, John Begier, Ed Harney; Navy scoring – Glen Miles 4, Robert Wehman 2, Brian Sullivan, Tom Hanzsche, Jeff Bellistri; Shots: Navy 48, Virginia 48; Saves: Navy 16, Virginia 14

Team	1	2	3	4	Total
Syracuse	8	5	3	1	17
Rutgers	2	1	2	0	5
Syracuse scoring – Tom Korrie 5, Todd Curry 4, Chris Baduini 2, Tom Nelson 2, Mark Brannigan, Chris Rossi, John Zulberti, Peter Allen; Rutgers scoring – Tim Donovan 2, Dave Disciorio, Ed Trabulsy, Jeff Lynch; Shots: Syracuse 38, Rutgers 28; Saves: Syracuse 18, Rutgers 15

=== First round ===
Team	1	2	3	4	Total
Massachusetts	5	3	4	4	16
New Hampshire	2	2	1	1	6
Massachusetts scoring – Tom Carmean 4, Kelley Carr 2, Doug Musco 2, Rich Abbott, Stephan Moreland, Pat Cain, Greg Fisk, Greg Collins, Chris Tyler, Greg Cannella, Tom Aldrich; New Hampshire scoring – Barry Fraser 2, Kevin Growney, Tom Arrix, Tom Snow, Mike McCaffrey; Shots: New Hampshire 48, Massachusetts 32; Saves: Massachusetts 20, New Hampshire 9

Team	1	2	3	4	Total
Rutgers	5	3	4	4	16
C.W. Post	2	3	2	1	8
Rutgers scoring – Dave Disciorio 3, Tim Donovan 3, Gregg Freid 2, Jeff Lynch 2, Ed Trabulsy 2, Craig Tomsky; New Hampshire scoring – Don Borges 3, Tim McIntee 2, Steve Tomaselli, John Campbell, Jim Bovich; Shots: Rutgers 48, C.W. Post 42; Saves: C. W. Post 16, Rutgers 11

== All-Tournament Team ==
- Gary Seivold, University of North Carolina (Named the tournament's Most Outstanding Player)

=== Leading scorers ===
Leading scorers	GP	G	A	Pts
Tom Korrie, Syracuse	2	8	4	12
Gary Seivold, North Carolina	3	5	7	12
Roddy Marino, Virginia	3	7	4	11
Tom Carmean, Massachusetts	2	6	3	9
Tim Donovan, Rutgers	2	5	3	8
John Zulberti, Syracuse	2	4	4	8
Del Dressel, Johns Hopkins	2	4	3	7
Will Rosebro, Virginia	3	5	2	7

== See also ==
- 1986 NCAA Division I women's lacrosse tournament
- 1986 NCAA Division III men's lacrosse tournament
