= Brown Bears men's lacrosse =

American college lacrosse team

- Founded: 1926; 100 years ago
- University: Brown University
- Head coach: Jon Torpey (since 2025 season)
- Stadium: Stevenson-Pincince Field (capacity: 3,500)
- Location: Providence, Rhode Island
- Conference: Ivy League
- Nickname: Bears
- Colors: Seal brown, cardinal red, and white

NCAA Tournament Final Fours
- (2) - 1994, 2016

NCAA Tournament Quarterfinals
- (10) - 1971, 1973, 1976, 1985, 1990, 1991, 1992, 1994, 1995, 2016

NCAA Tournament appearances
- (15) - 1971, 1973, 1976, 1985, 1987, 1990, 1991, 1992, 1994, 1995, 1997, 2009, 2015, 2016, 2022

Conference regular season championships
- (10) - 1969, 1973, 1985, 1991, 1994, 1995, 2008, 2010, 2015, 2016

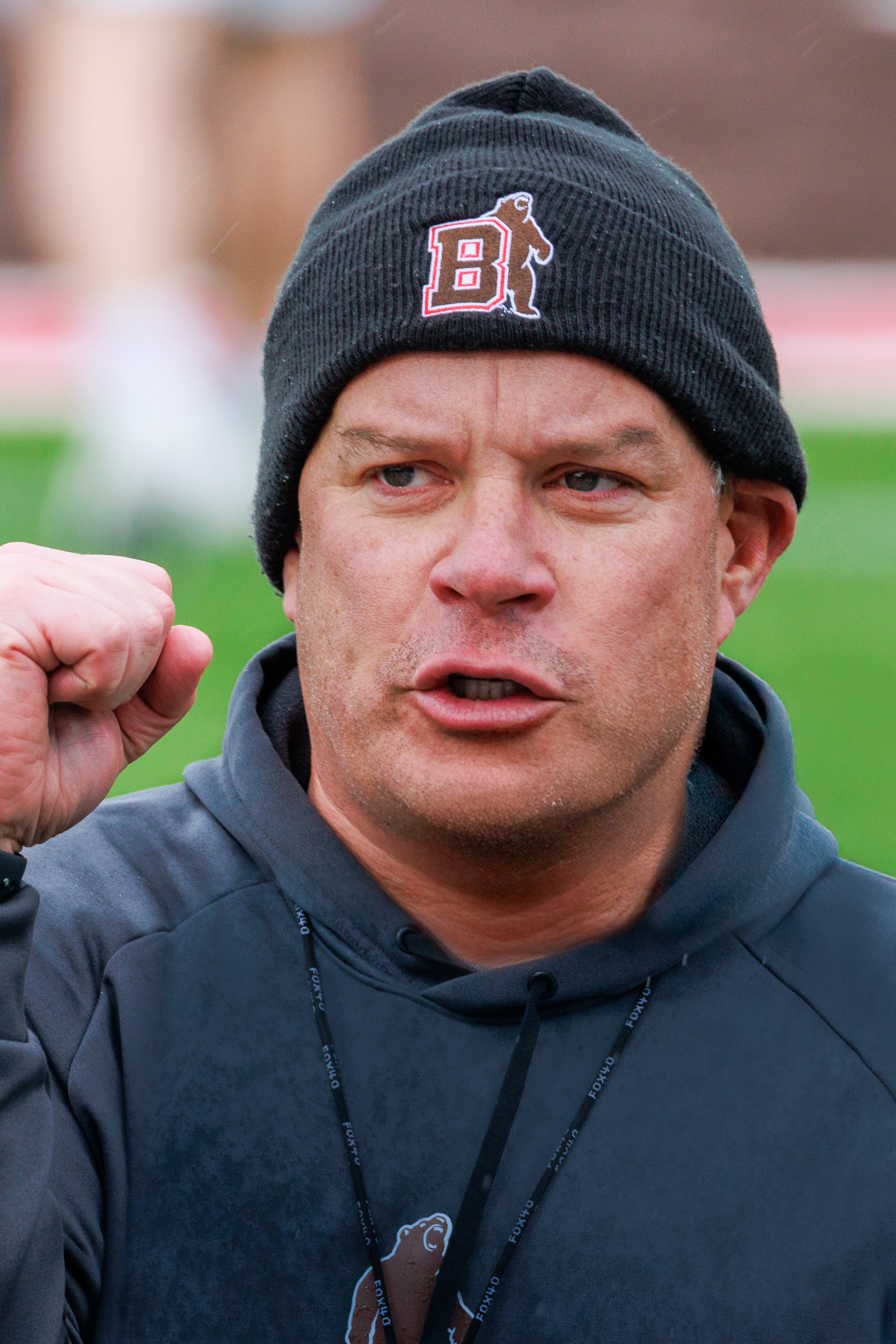
Head coach Jon Torpey

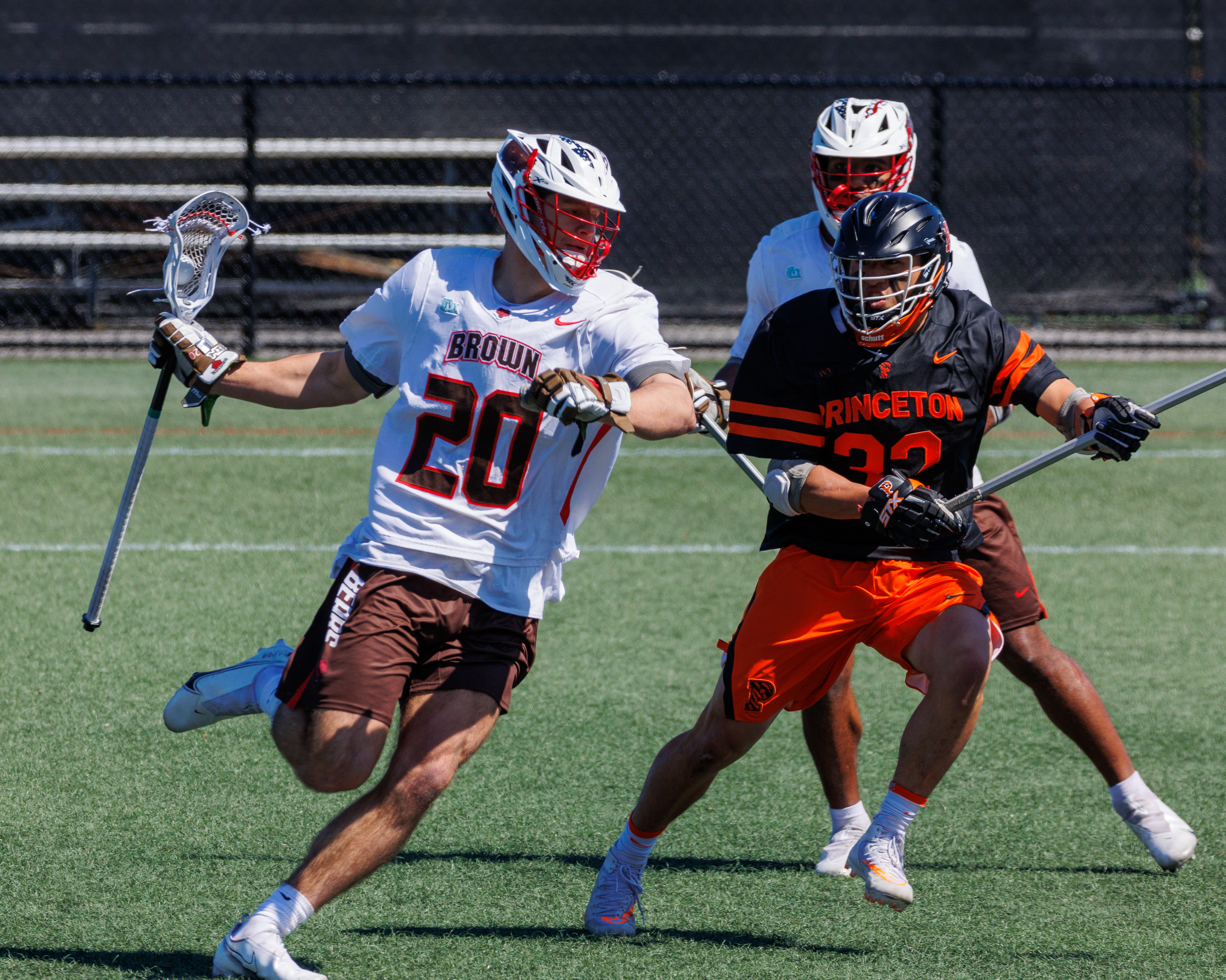
Princeton Tigers at Brown Bears, 2022

The Brown Bears men's lacrosse team represents Brown University in the National Collegiate Athletic Association (NCAA) Division I men's lacrosse. Brown competes in the Ivy League and plays its home games at Stevenson-Pincince Field in Providence, Rhode Island.

== History ==
The Brown University men's lacrosse program was founded in 1926. Brown continued to compete in intercollegiate lacrosse until 1937 when the sport was discontinued. The lacrosse program resumed play in 1961 under head coach Cliff Stevenson. Since 1961, Brown has won 10 Ivy League championships (five outright titles, five shared) and has made 14 NCAA Men's Lacrosse Championship tournament appearances, including nine NCAA Quarterfinal appearances. In 1994, Brown became the first program from New England to play in the NCAA Final Four, a record that remained until the UMass made a Final Four appearance in 2006. Every season since 2010, Brown has played Bryant and Providence for the Ocean State Cup. Brown won the Cup in 2010, 2013, 2014, 2015, 2017, 2019, 2022 and 2025.

=== National awards ===
The Brown lacrosse program has garnered numerous national collegiate lacrosse awards. Darren Lowe '92 was named 1992 NCAA Division I Player of the Year, as well as 1992 Division I Attackman of the Year. Standout goalie Greg Cattrano, was named Division I Goalie of the Year. In 2009, Jordan Burke became the Division I Goalie of the Year. Brown has also had two coaches selected as Division I Coach of the Year: Dom Starsia in 1985 and 1991, and Peter Lasagna in 1994. In 2016 attackman Dylan Molloy received the Tewaaraton Trophy, the Jack Turnbull Award, and the Lt. Raymond Enners Award.

=== Ivy League awards ===
Brown has also won numerous Ivy League awards since All-Ivy teams were first selected in 1957. Since the award's inception in 1974, ten Brown Bears have been named Ivy League Player of the Year and four Bears have been named Men's Lacrosse Ivy League Rookie of the Year since the Rookie award was established in 1981. Since 1957, three Bears have been chosen First Team All-Ivy three times (Darren Lowe 1990, '91, '92), (Bill Aliber 1981, '82, '83), (Thomas Muldoon 2008, '09, '10) while 14 Bears have been named First Team All-Ivy two times. Jordan Burke became the first player to win Ivy League Player of the Year in back to back years (2008, '09).

== Season Results ==
The following is a list of Brown's results by season as an NCAA Division I program:

Season	Coach	Overall	Conference	Standing	Postseason
Cliff Stevenson (Ivy League) (1961–1982)
1971	Cliff Stevenson	11–3	5–1	2nd	NCAA Division I Quarterfinals
1972	Cliff Stevenson	9–4	4–2	T–2nd	
1973	Cliff Stevenson	10–2	6–0	1st	NCAA Division I Quarterfinals
1974	Cliff Stevenson	6–4	4–2	3rd	
1975	Cliff Stevenson	7–5	3–3	4th	
1976	Cliff Stevenson	10–4	5–1	2nd	NCAA Division I Quarterfinals
1977	Cliff Stevenson	3–10	1–5	T–5th	
1978	Cliff Stevenson	6–6	3–3	T–3rd	
1979	Cliff Stevenson	8–4	3–3	5th	
1980	Cliff Stevenson	9–4	3–3	4th	
1981	Cliff Stevenson	6–6	4–2	T–2nd	
1982	Cliff Stevenson	5–9	1–5	6th	
Cliff Stevenson:		170–95 (.642)	67–47 (.588)		
Dom Starsia (Ivy League) (1983–1992)
1983	Dom Starsia	9–5	4–2	3rd	
1984	Dom Starsia	9–5	4–2	T–2nd	
1985	Dom Starsia	12–3	6–0	1st	NCAA Division I Quarterfinals
1986	Dom Starsia	8–6	4–2	T–2nd	
1987	Dom Starsia	10–5	4–2	T–2nd	NCAA Division I First Round
1988	Dom Starsia	8–6	3–3	T–4th	
1989	Dom Starsia	9–6	4–2	T–2nd	
1990	Dom Starsia	11–5	3–3	4th	NCAA Division I Quarterfinals
1991	Dom Starsia	13–1	6–0	1st	NCAA Division I Quarterfinals
1992	Dom Starsia	12–4	4–2	3rd	NCAA Division I Quarterfinals
Dom Starsia:		101–46 (.687)	42–18 (.700)		
Peter Lasagna (Ivy League) (1993–2000)
1993	Peter Lasagna	10–3	5–1	2nd	
1994	Peter Lasagna	13–5	6–0	1st	NCAA Division I Final Four
1995	Peter Lasagna	10–6	5–1	T–1st	NCAA Division I Quarterfinals
1996	Peter Lasagna	7–6	3–3	3rd	
1997	Peter Lasagna	8–7	4–2	T–2nd	NCAA Division I First Round
1998	Peter Lasagna	4–9	2–4	5th	
1999	Peter Lasagna	4–9	2–4	T–4th	
2000	Peter Lasagna	9–6	3–3	T–3rd	
Peter Lasagna:		65–51 (.560)	30–18 (.625)		
Scott Nelson (Ivy League) (2001–2006)
2001	Scott Nelson	6–8	2–4	T–5th	
2002	Scott Nelson	7–7	4–2	T–2nd	
2003	Scott Nelson	4–10	1–5	7th	
2004	Scott Nelson	9–5	2–4	T–5th	
2005	Scott Nelson	6–6	2–4	T–5th	
2006	Scott Nelson	2–11	0–6	7th	
Scott Nelson:		34–47 (.420)	11–25 (.306)		
Lars Tiffany (Ivy League) (2007–2016)
2007	Lars Tiffany	7–7	1–5	T–6th	
2008	Lars Tiffany	11–3	5–1	T–1st	
2009	Lars Tiffany	12–4	4–2	3rd	NCAA Division I First Round
2010	Lars Tiffany	8–6	4–2	T–1st	
2011	Lars Tiffany	6–8	2–4	T–5th	
2012	Lars Tiffany	7–8	3–3	4th	
2013	Lars Tiffany	8–7	2–4	5th	
2014	Lars Tiffany	8–6	2–4	T–5th	
2015	Lars Tiffany	12–5	4–2	T–1st	NCAA Division I First Round
2016	Lars Tiffany	16–3	6–0	1st	NCAA Division I Final Four
Lars Tiffany:		95–56 (.629)	33–27 (.550)		
Mike Daly (Ivy League) (2017–2024)
2017	Mike Daly	10–6	4–2	T–2nd	
2018	Mike Daly	6–9	3–3	T–3rd	
2019	Mike Daly	7–9	3–3	4th	
2020	Mike Daly	3–2	0–0	†	†
2021	Mike Daly	1–0	0–0	††	††
2022	Mike Daly	10–6	4–2	T–1st	NCAA Division I First Round
2023	Mike Daly	6–8	2–4	T–5th	
2024	Mike Daly	3–11	2–4	T–5th	
2025	Mike Daly	3–10	0–6	7th	
2026	Mike Daly	6–7	1–5	6th	
Mike Daly:		55–68 (.447)	19–29 (.396)		
Total:		556–412–4 (.574)			
National champion Postseason invitational champion Conference regular season champion Conference regular season and conference tournament champion Division regular season champion Division regular season and conference tournament champion Conference tournament champion

†NCAA canceled 2020 collegiate activities due to the COVID-19 virus.
†† Ivy League cancelled 2021 collegiate season due to the COVID-19 virus.
