= Villanova Wildcats men's lacrosse =

Lacrosse team of the Villanova University

- Founded: 1981 (varsity)
- University: Villanova University
- Head coach: Michael Corrado (since 2007 season)
- Stadium: Villanova Stadium (capacity: 12,000)
- Location: Villanova, Pennsylvania
- Conference: Big East Conference
- Colors: Navy blue and white

NCAA Tournament appearances
- (3) - 2009, 2011, 2018

Conference Tournament championships
- (1) - 2009

Conference regular season championships
- (2) - 2013, 2025

The Villanova Wildcats men's lacrosse team represents Villanova University in National Collegiate Athletic Association (NCAA) Division I men's lacrosse. The Wildcats were elevated to the varsity level in 1981 after competing as a club sport since 1961.

== History ==
Villanova currently competes as a member of the Big East Conference and plays their home games at Villanova Stadium in Villanova, Pennsylvania.

Villanova competed as an independent until joining the Colonial Athletic Association in 2002; winning the CAA tournament for their first title in 2009. The fourth-seeded Wildcats were the lowest-seeded champions in conference tournament history but had qualified for conference tournament for the fifth year in a row. Villanova also made their first NCAA tournament appearance in 2009 but lost in the first round to the top-seeded Virginia, 18–6.

A pivotal point for the program occurred in 2009 under head coach Mike Corrado. The Wildcats secured their first NCAA Tournament appearance after earning an at-large bid, marking a milestone in the program's history. That season also featured Villanova's first win over a top-10 opponent, solidifying their place on the national stage.

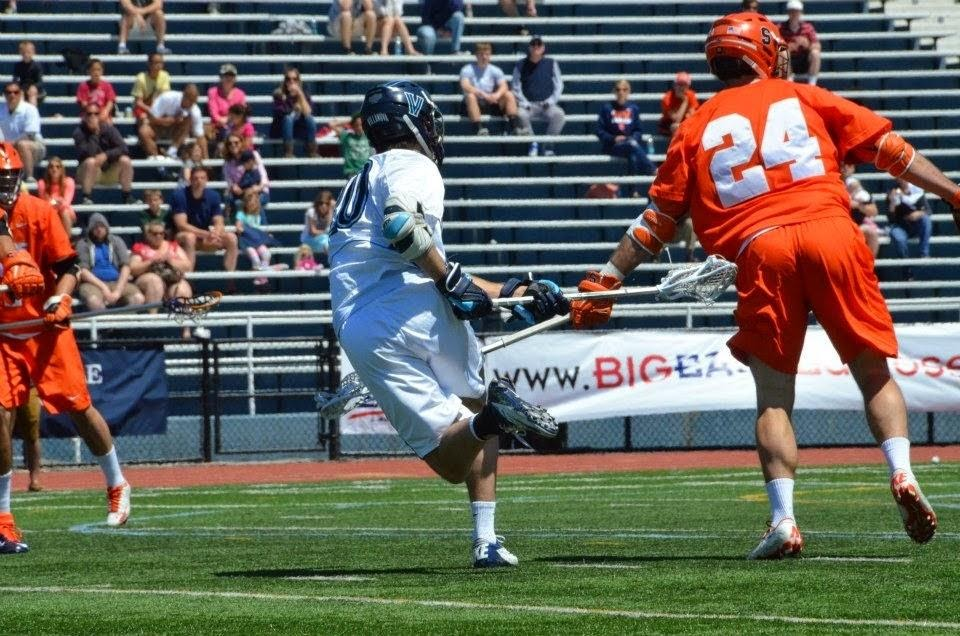
Villanova vs. Syracuse 2011 (#20 Harte Thompson)

== Notable players ==
Several standout players have made significant contributions to the Villanova Wildcats Men's Lacrosse program:

- Brian Karalunas: A defensive midfielder known for his unmatched work ethic and on-field intelligence. He earned USILA First-Team All-American honors in 2011 and was awarded the Senior CLASS Award for excellence in athletics, academics, and community service.
- Kevin Cunningham: A versatile attackman and team leader, Cunningham was instrumental in the Wildcats' success during the 2011 season, earning All-Big East honors.
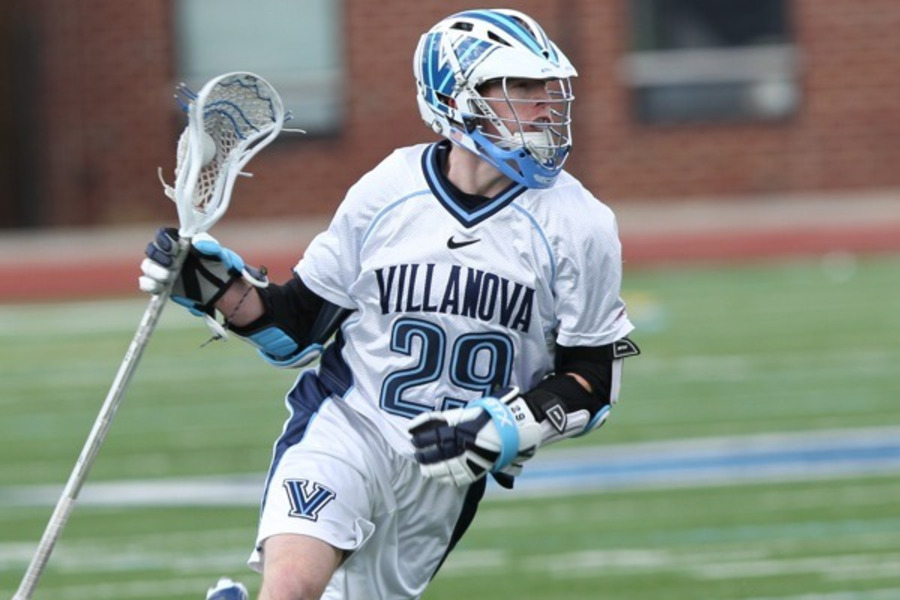
  Kevin Cunningham, Attack, Villanova
- Jack Rice: One of the program's all-time leading scorers, Rice was known for his clutch performances and finishing ability, particularly during the Wildcats' NCAA Tournament runs.
- Chris Ficke: A reliable defenseman, Ficke played a crucial role in anchoring the Wildcats' defensive unit during their successful 2009 and 2011 campaigns.
- T.J. O'Donnell: A midfielder whose consistent performances and leadership helped guide the team through some of its most successful seasons.

== 2011 Roster ==
The 2011 Villanova Wildcats Men's Lacrosse roster was as follows:

No.	Name	Position	Year	Height	Hometown	High School
1	Joe Payne	Midfield	Junior	–	Birmingham, Mich.	Brother Rice
2	Jack Rice	Attack	Sophomore	5'11"	Baltimore, Md.	Boys' Latin
3	Paul Mita	Attack	Sophomore	6'5"	Berwyn, Pa.	Conestoga
4	Billy Hurley	Goalkeeper	Sophomore	6'2"	Morristown, N.J.	Delbarton
5	Nolan Vihlen	Midfield	Junior	5'10"	Germantown, Tenn.	Christian Brother
6	Chris Aitken	Midfield	Redshirt Junior	6'1"	Haverford, Pa.	Haverford School
7	Will Casertano	Attack	Sophomore	5'9"	Millbrook, N.Y.	Salisbury School
8	Max Hart	Midfield	Sophomore	5'10"	Bethesda, Md.	Georgetown Prep
9	Peter Metcalf	Goalkeeper	Sophomore	6'4"	Sea Girt, N.J.	The Governor's Academy
10	Hunter Broome	Defense	Sophomore	6'2"	Richmond, Va.	Collegiate School
11	Dan Gutierrez	Goalkeeper	Junior	6'1"	Chevy Chase, Md.	Georgetown Prep
12	Matt Bell	Attack	Junior	5'10"	Severna Park, Md.	St. Mary's
13	Mike Brennan	Midfield	Senior	5'11"	Manhasset, N.Y.	Chaminade
14	T.J. O'Donnell	Midfield	Senior	–	Randolph, N.J.	Delbarton
15	Chris Ficke	Defense	Senior	6'1"	Madison, N.J.	Delbarton
16	Kevin O'Neil	Attack	Freshman	6'2"	Cockeysville, Md.	Boys' Latin
17	Andrew Henrich	Midfield	Senior	6'3"	Wyndmoor, Pa.	La Salle
18	Troy Higgins	Defense	Senior	6'3"	Wayne, N.J.	Seton Hall Prep
19	Chris Creighton	Defense	Junior	6'1"	West Chester, Pa.	Malvern Prep
20	Harte Thompson	Midfield	Sophomore	6'3"	Chester Springs, Pa.	Malvern Prep
21	John LoCascio	Defense	Freshman	5'11"	Fairfield, N.J.	West Essex Regional
22	Nick LoBiondo	Midfield	Sophomore	5'9"	Mountain Lakes, N.J.	Mountain Lakes
23	Jimmy Wyatt	Midfield	Freshman	5'9"	Whitehouse Station, N.J.	Hunterdon Central Regional
24	Remington Pope	Defense	Freshman	6'1"	Boston, Mass.	The Governor's Academy
25	Brian Karalunas	Defense	Senior	5'11"	Dewitt, N.Y.	Jamesville-Dewitt
26	Chris Piccirilli	Defense	Freshman	6'5"	Davidsonville, Md.	Archbishop Spalding
27	Christopher Conroy	Defense	Freshman	6'1"	Chatham, N.J.	Chatham
28	CJ Burke	Midfield	Junior	5'9"	Pittsburgh, Pa.	Central Catholic
29	Kevin Cunningham	Attack	Junior	5'11"	Garden City, N.Y.	Kellenberg
30	C.J. Small	Midfield	Junior	5'11"	San Diego, Calif.	La Costa Canyon
32	Alex Garrison	Midfield	Freshman	6'2"	New Canaan, Conn.	The Taft School
33	Nick Doherty	Attack	Sophomore	5'10"	Bernardsville, N.J.	Delbarton
36	Mark Jackson	Midfield	Freshman	5'10"	West Chester, Pa.	Malvern Prep
37	Alex Westcott	Attack	Senior	5'10"	Millerton, N.Y.	The Hotchkiss School
40	Michael Vigilante	Midfield	Junior	6'2"	Massapequa, N.Y.	Massapequa
41	Tyler Brennan	Defense	Sophomore	6'2"	East Setauket, N.Y.	Ward Melville
42	Ryan McDonagh	Defense	Junior	6'1"	Huntington, N.Y.	St. Anthony's
45	Thomas Croonquist	Midfield	Freshman	5'11"	North Caldwell, N.J.	Seton Hall

== Season results ==
The following is a list of Villanova's results by season as an NCAA Division I program:

Season	Coach	Overall	Conference	Standing	Postseason
Lee Stevens (Independent) (1981–1982)
1981	Lee Stevens	4–8			
1982	Lee Stevens	4–8			
Lee Stevens:		8–16 (.333)			
Randy Marks (Independent) (1983–2001)
1983	Randy Marks	7–4			
1984	Randy Marks	11–1			
1985	Randy Marks	4–8			
1986	Randy Marks	8–6			
1987	Randy Marks	7–6			
1988	Randy Marks	5–8			
1989	Randy Marks	9–5			
1990	Randy Marks	9–5			
1991	Randy Marks	9–5			
1992	Randy Marks	7–7			
1993	Randy Marks	6–7			
1994	Randy Marks	5–8			
1995	Randy Marks	6–9			
1996	Randy Marks	8–7			
1997	Randy Marks	7–7			
1998	Randy Marks	6–8			
1999	Randy Marks	8–6			
2000	Randy Marks	9–5			
2001	Randy Marks	8–6			
Randy Marks (Colonial Athletic Association) (2002–2006)
2002	Randy Marks	6–8	2–4	5th	
2003	Randy Marks	10–5	3–2	3rd	
2004	Randy Marks	12–3	4–1	2nd	
2005	Randy Marks	7–8	3–2	T–3rd	
2006	Randy Marks	5–10	3–3	T–3rd	
Randy Marks:		179–152 (.541)	15–12 (.556)		
Mike Corrado (Colonial Athletic Association) (2007–2009)
2007	Mike Corrado	7–7	2–4	T–4th	
2008	Mike Corrado	5–10	3–3	T–3rd	
2009	Mike Corrado	11–6	3–3	T–3rd	NCAA Division I First Round
Mike Corrado (Big East Conference) (2010–Present)
2010	Mike Corrado	10–5	4–2	3rd	
2011	Mike Corrado	11–5	3–3	4th	NCAA Division I First Round
2012	Mike Corrado	8–7	4–2	2nd	
2013	Mike Corrado	7–8	5–1	T–1st	
2014	Mike Corrado	6–10	3–3	T–3rd	
2015	Mike Corrado	6–8	1–4	T–4th	
2016	Mike Corrado	9–5	3–2	3rd	
2017	Mike Corrado	9–6	4–1	2nd	
2018	Mike Corrado	10–6	3–2	T–2nd	NCAA Division I First Round
2019	Mike Corrado	8–7	3–2	T–2nd	
2020	Mike Corrado	4–3	0–0	†	†
2021	Mike Corrado	7–5	6–4	3rd	
2022	Mike Corrado	9–6	3–2	3rd	
2023	Mike Corrado	10–5	3–2	3rd	
2024	Mike Corrado	9–7	2–3	4th	
2025	Mike Corrado	8–7	4–1	T–1st	
2026	Mike Corrado	6–8	3–2	T–2nd	
Mike Corrado:		168–133 (.558)	84–50 (.627)		
Total:		346–295 (.540)			
National champion Postseason invitational champion Conference regular season champion Conference regular season and conference tournament champion Division regular season champion Division regular season and conference tournament champion Conference tournament champion

†NCAA canceled 2020 collegiate activities due to the COVID-19 virus.

== See also ==
- Lacrosse in Pennsylvania
