= NCAA Division I men's lacrosse tournament appearances by school =

The following is a list of National Collegiate Athletic Association (NCAA) Division I college lacrosse teams that have qualified for the NCAA Division I Men's Lacrosse Championship, with teams listed by number of appearances.

== Individual team performance ==
NCAA Division I Men's Lacrosse Championship
Team	Tournament appearances	Tournament years	Tournament debut	Last tournament	Best result
Johns Hopkins	50	1972, 1973, 1974, 1975, 1976, 1977, 1978, 1979, 1980, 1981, 1982, 1983, 1984, 1985, 1986, 1987, 1988, 1989, 1990, 1991, 1992, 1993, 1994, 1995, 1996, 1997, 1998, 1999, 2000, 2001, 2002, 2003, 2004, 2005, 2006, 2007, 2008, 2009, 2010, 2011, 2012, 2014, 2015, 2016, 2017, 2018, 2019, 2023, 2024, 2026	1972	2026	Champions (1974, 1978, 1979, 1980, 1984, 1985, 1987, 2005, 2007)
Maryland	48	1971, 1972, 1973, 1974, 1975, 1976, 1977, 1978, 1979, 1981, 1982, 1983, 1986, 1987, 1989, 1991, 1992, 1993, 1994, 1995, 1996, 1997, 1998, 2000, 2001, 2003, 2004, 2005, 2006, 2007, 2008, 2009, 2010, 2011, 2012, 2013, 2014, 2015, 2016, 2017, 2018, 2019, 2021, 2022, 2023, 2024, 2025	1971	2025	Champions (1973, 1975, 2017, 2022)
Virginia	44	1971, 1972, 1973, 1974, 1978, 1979, 1980, 1981, 1982, 1983, 1984, 1985, 1986, 1988, 1990, 1991, 1993, 1994, 1995, 1996, 1997, 1998, 1999, 2000, 2001, 2002, 2003, 2005, 2006, 2007, 2008, 2009, 2010, 2011, 2012, 2014, 2015, 2018, 2019, 2021, 2022, 2023, 2024, 2026	1971	2026	Champions (1972, 1999, 2003, 2006, 2011, 2019, 2021)
Syracuse ^{(a)}	42	1979, 1980, 1981, 1983, 1984, 1985, 1986, 1987, 1988, 1989, 1990, 1991, 1992, 1993, 1994, 1995, 1996, 1997, 1998, 1999, 2000, 2001, 2002, 2003, 2004, 2005, 2006, 2008, 2009, 2010, 2011, 2012, 2013, 2014, 2015, 2016, 2017, 2018, 2019, 2021, 2024, 2025, 2026	1979	2026	Champions (1983, 1988, 1989, 1990, 1993, 1995, 2000, 2002, 2004, 2008, 2009)
North Carolina	35	1976, 1977, 1980, 1981, 1982, 1983, 1984, 1985, 1986, 1987, 1988, 1989, 1990, 1991, 1992, 1993, 1994, 1995, 1996, 1998, 2004, 2007, 2008, 2009, 2010, 2011, 2012, 2013, 2014, 2015, 2016, 2017, 2021, 2025, 2026	1976	2026	Champions (1981, 1982, 1986, 1991, 2016)
Cornell	32	1971, 1974, 1975, 1976, 1977, 1978, 1979, 1980, 1982, 1983, 1987, 1988, 1989, 1995, 2000, 2002, 2004, 2005, 2006, 2007, 2008, 2009, 2010, 2011, 2013, 2014, 2015, 2018, 2022, 2023, 2025, 2026	1971	2026	Champions (1971, 1976, 1977, 2025)
Notre Dame	29	1990, 1992, 1993, 1994, 1995, 1996, 1997, 1999, 2000, 2001, 2006, 2007, 2008, 2009, 2010, 2011, 2012, 2013, 2014, 2015, 2016, 2017, 2018, 2019, 2021, 2023, 2024, 2025, 2026	1990	2026	Champions (2023, 2024)
Duke	28	1992, 1994, 1995, 1997, 1998, 1999, 2000, 2001, 2002, 2005, 2007, 2008, 2009, 2010, 2011, 2012, 2013, 2014, 2015, 2016, 2017, 2018, 2019, 2021, 2023, 2024, 2025, 2026	1992	2026	Champions (2010, 2013, 2014)
Navy	27	1971, 1972, 1973, 1974, 1975, 1976, 1977, 1978, 1979, 1980, 1981, 1982, 1986, 1987, 1988, 1989, 1992, 1993, 1994, 1999, 2004, 2005, 2006, 2007, 2008, 2009, 2016	1971	2016	Runners-Up (1975, 2004)
Loyola	25	1988, 1989, 1990, 1991, 1992, 1993, 1994, 1995, 1996, 1997, 1998, 1999, 2000, 2001, 2007, 2008, 2010, 2012, 2013, 2014, 2016, 2017, 2018, 2019, 2021	1988	2021	Champions (2012)
Princeton	25	1990, 1991, 1992, 1993, 1994, 1995, 1996, 1997, 1998, 1999, 2000, 2001, 2002, 2003, 2004, 2006, 2007, 2009, 2010, 2012, 2022, 2023, 2024, 2025, 2026	1990	2026	Champions (1992, 1994, 1996, 1997, 1998, 2001, 2026)
Massachusetts	20	1976, 1977, 1979, 1981, 1986, 1987, 1988, 1989, 1990, 1991, 1993, 1995, 1997, 2002, 2003, 2004, 2006, 2009, 2012, 2018	1976	2018	Runners-Up (2006)
Army	19	1971, 1972, 1973, 1978, 1981, 1982, 1983, 1984, 1985, 1987, 1993, 1996, 2003, 2004, 2005, 2010, 2019, 2023, 2026	1971	2026	Semifinals (1971, 1984)
Georgetown	19	1997, 1998, 1999, 2000, 2001, 2002, 2003, 2004, 2005, 2006, 2007, 2018, 2019, 2021, 2022, 2023, 2024, 2025, 2026	1997	2026	Semifinals (1999)
Hofstra	17	1971, 1973, 1974, 1975, 1978, 1993, 1996, 1997, 1999, 2000, 2001, 2003, 2006, 2008, 2009, 2010, 2011	1971	2011	Quarterfinals (1993, 1999, 2001, 2006)
Towson	17	1989, 1991, 1992, 1994, 1996, 2001, 2003, 2004, 2005, 2007, 2013, 2015, 2016, 2017, 2019, 2024, 2025	1989	2025	Runners-Up (1991)
Brown	15	1971, 1973, 1976, 1985, 1987, 1990, 1991, 1992, 1994, 1995, 1997, 2009, 2015, 2016, 2022	1971	2022	Semifinals (1994, 2016)
Penn	14	1975, 1977, 1983, 1984, 1985, 1987, 1988, 1989, 2004, 2006, 2011, 2014, 2019, 2022	1975	2022	Semifinals (1988)
Albany	13	2003, 2004, 2005, 2007, 2013, 2014, 2015, 2016, 2017, 2018, 2024, 2025, 2026	2003	2026	Semifinals (2018)
Denver	13	2006, 2008, 2010, 2011, 2012, 2013, 2014, 2015, 2016, 2017, 2018, 2021, 2024	2006	2024	Champions (2015)
Yale	13	1988, 1990, 1992, 2012, 2013, 2015, 2016, 2017, 2018, 2019, 2022, 2023, 2026	1988	2026	Champions (2018)
Rutgers	11	1972, 1974, 1975, 1984, 1986, 1990, 1991, 2003, 2004, 2021, 2022	1972	2022	Semifinals (2022)
Penn State	9	2003, 2005, 2013, 2017, 2019, 2023, 2024, 2025, 2026	2003	2026	Semifinals (2019, 2025)
Washington & Lee	8	1972, 1973, 1974, 1975, 1976, 1977, 1978, 1980	1971	1980	Semifinals (1973, 1974, 1975)
Delaware	8	1984, 1999, 2005, 2007, 2010, 2011, 2022, 2023	1984	2023	Semifinals (2007)
Harvard	8	1980, 1988, 1990, 1996, 2006, 2014, 2022, 2025	1980	2025	Quarterfinals (1990, 1996)
Ohio State	8	2003, 2004, 2008, 2013, 2015, 2017, 2022, 2025	2003	2025	Runners-Up (2017)
Richmond	7	2014, 2018, 2019, 2022, 2023, 2025, 2026	2014	2026	Quarterfinals (2025)
UMBC	7	1998, 1999, 2006, 2007, 2008, 2009, 2019	1998	2019	Quarterfinals (2007)
Air Force	6	1971, 1988, 2014, 2016, 2017, 2025	1971	2025	First Round (1971, 1988, 2014, 2016, 2017, 2025)
Bryant	6	2013, 2014, 2015, 2017, 2021, 2023	2013	2023	Quarterfinals (2014)
Hobart	5	1998, 2000, 2002, 2004, 2016	1998	2016	First Round (1998, 2000, 2002, 2004)
Marist	5	2005, 2015, 2019, 2023, 2026	2005	2026	First Round (2005)
Robert Morris	5	2018, 2019, 2022, 2025, 2026	2018	2026	First Round (2018, 2019)
Adelphi	4	1982, 1985, 1987, 1989	1982	1989	Quarterfinals (1987, 1989)
Lehigh	4	2012, 2013, 2021, 2024	2012	2024	First Round (2012, 2013)
Colgate	4	2008, 2012, 2015, 2025	2008	2025	Quarterfinals (2012)
Siena	4	2009, 2011, 2014, 2025	2009	2025	First Round (2009, 2011, 2014)
Stony Brook	4	2002, 2010, 2012, 2026	2002	2026	Quarterfinals (2010)
Canisius	3	2008, 2012, 2018	2008	2018	First Round (2008, 2012)
Michigan State	3	1987, 1989, 1991	1987	1991	First Round (1987, 1989, 1991)
Providence	3	2004, 2006, 2007	2004	2007	First Round (2004, 2006, 2007)
Villanova	3	2009, 2011, 2018	2009	2018	First Round (2009, 2011)
Bucknell	2	2001, 2011	2001	2011	First Round (2001, 2011)
Drexel	2	2014, 2021	2014	2021	Quarterfinals (2014)
Fairfield	2	2002, 2005	2002	2005	First Round (2002, 2005)
Hartford	2	2011, 2016	2011	2016	First Round (2011)
High Point	2	2015, 2021	2015	2021	First Round (2021)
Manhattan	2	2002, 2022	2002	2022	First Round (2002)
Marquette	2	2016, 2017	2016	2017	First Round (2016, 2017)
Michigan	2	2023, 2024	2023	2024	First Round (2023)
Monmouth	2	2017, 2021	2017	2021	Play-in Round (2017)
Mount St. Mary's	2	2003, 2010	2003	2010	First Round (2003, 2010)
Saint Joseph's	2	2022, 2024	2022	2024	First Round (2022, 2024)
Vermont	2	2021, 2022	2021	2022	First Round (2021, 2022)
Utah	2	2023, 2024	2023	2024	First Round (2023, 2024)
Boston University	1	2022	2022	2022	First Round (2022)
Butler	1	1998	1998	1998	First Round (1998)
Cortland	1	1972	1972	1972	Semifinals (1972)
Dartmouth	1	2003	2003	2003	First Round (2003)
Detroit Mercy	1	2013	2013	2013	First Round (2013)
Jacksonville	1	2026	2026	2026	First Round (2026)
LIU (Note: LIU's only D-I tournament appearance to date was made by the program representing Long Island University's Post campus, known as C.W. Post when it appeared in 1986 and later as LIU Post. After the 2019 season, the university merged the athletic programs of its two main campuses, Brooklyn (then a Division I member that sponsored lacrosse only for women) and Post (which returned to Division II when the NCAA reinstated that division's men's lacrosse championship in 1993), creating a new D-I program that now competes as the LIU Sharks. The Post men's lacrosse program was converted to the LIU program, inheriting all of Post's men's lacrosse history and records.)	1	1986	1986	1986	First Round (1986)
New Hampshire	1	1986	1986	1986	First Round (1986)
NC State	1	1979	1979	1979	First Round (1979)
Quinnipiac	1	2016	2016	2016	First Round (2016)
Sacred Heart	1	2024	2024	2024	Play–in game (2024)

== Individual team record ==
The following is a list of National Collegiate Athletic Association (NCAA) Division I college lacrosse teams that have qualified for the NCAA Division I Men's Lacrosse Championship, with teams listed by number of appearances and their tournament won-loss records.

Team	Tournament Appearances	Years	Won	Lost	Pct.	1st	2nd	3rd ^{(b)}	Last Appearance
Adelphi	1982-85-87-89	4	2	4	.333	0	0	0	1989
Air Force	1971-88-2014-16-17-25	6	2	6	.250	0	0	0	2025
Albany	2003-04-05-07-13-14-15-16-17-18-24-25-26	13	8	13	.381	0	0	1	2026
Army	1971-72-73-78-81-82-83-84-85-87-93-96-2003-04-05-10-19-23-26	19	4	17	.190	0	0	1	2026
Brown	1971-73-76-85-87-90-91-92-94-95-97-2009-16	14	7	14	.333	0	0	1	2016
Bryant	2013-14-15-17-21-23	6	3	5	.375	0	0	0	2023
Bucknell	2001-11	2	0	2	.000	0	0	0	2011
Butler	1998	1	0	1	.000	0	0	0	1998
C. W. Post / LIU	1986	1	0	1	.000	0	0	0	1986
Canisius	2008-12	2	0	2	.000	0	0	0	2021
Colgate	2008-12-15-25	4	1	4	.200	0	0	0	2025
Cornell	1971-74-75-76-77-78-79-80-82-83-87-88-89-95-2000-02-04-05-06-07-08-09-10-11-13-14-15-18-22-23-25-26	32	39	26	.600	4	4	5	2026
Cortland	1972	1	1	1	.500	0	0	1	1972
Dartmouth	2003	1	0	1	.000	0	0	0	
Delaware	1984-99-2005-07-10-11-22-23	8	6	8	.429	0	0	1	2023
Denver	2006-08-10-11-12-13-14-15-16-17-18-21-24	13	16	12	.571	1	0	5	2024
Detroit Mercy	2013	1	0	1	.000	0	0	0	2013
Drexel	2014-21	2	1	2	.333	0	0	0	2021
Duke	1992-94-95-97-98-99-2000-01-02-05-07-08-09-10-11-12-13-14-15-16-17-18-19-21-23-24-25-26	28	43	24	.642	3	3	7	2026
Fairfield	2002-05	2	0	2	.000	0	0	0	2005
Georgetown	1997-98-99-2000-01-02-03-04-05-06-07-18-19-21-22-23-24-25-26	18	13	18	.419	0	0	1	2026
Hartford	2011-16	2	0	2	.000	0	0	0	2016
Harvard	1980-88-90-96-2006-14-25	8	2	7	.222	0	0	0	2025
High Point	2015-21	2	0	2	.000	0	0	0	2021
Hobart	1998-2000-02-04-16	5	0	5	.000	0	0	0	2016
Hofstra	1971-73-74-75-78-93-96-97-99-2000-01-03-06-08-09-10-11	17	4	17	.190	0	0	0	2011
Jacksonville	2026	1	1	1	.500	0	0	0	2026
Johns Hopkins	1972-73-74-75-76-77-78-79-80-81-82-83-84-85-86-87-88-89-90-91-92-93-94-95-96-97-98-99-2000-01-02-03-04-05-06-07-08-09-10-11-12-14-15-16-17-18-19-23-24-26	50	71	37	.657	9	9	11	2026
Lehigh	2012-13-21-24	4	0	4	.000	0	0	0	2024
Loyola	1988-89-90-91-92-93-94-95-96-97-98-99-2000-01-07-08-10-12-13-14-16-17-18-19-21	24	17	24	.415	1	1	2	2021
Manhattan	2002	1	0	1	.000	0	0	0	2002
Marist	2005-15-23-26	4	2	4	.333	0	0	0	2026
Marquette	2016	1	0	1	.000	0	0	0	2016
Maryland	1971-72-73-74-75-76-77-78-79-81-82-83-86-87-89-91-92-93-94-95-96-97-98-2000-01-03-04-05-06-07-08-09-10-11-12-13-14-15-16-17-18-19-21-22-23-24-25	47	71	43	.623	3	13	14	2025
UMBC	1998-99-2006-07-08-09-19	7	1	7	.125	0	0	0	2019
Massachusetts	1976-77-79-81-86-87-88-89-90-91-93-95-97-2002-03-04-06-09-12-18	20	9	20	.310	0	1	0	2018
Michigan State	1987-89-91	3	0	3	.000	0	0	0	1991
Mount St. Mary's	2003-10	2	0	2	.000	0	0	0	2010
Navy	1971-72-73-74-75-76-77-78-79-80-81-82-86-87-88-89-92-93-94-99-2004-05-06-07-08-09-16	27	17	27	.386	0	2	6	2016
New Hampshire	1986	1	0	1	.000	0	0	0	
North Carolina	1976-77-80-81-82-83-84-85-86-87-88-89-90-91-92-93-94-95-96-98-2004-07-09-10-11-12-13-14-15-16-17-21-25-26	35	33	27	.550	5	1	7	2026
NC State	1979	1	0	1	.000	0	0	0	
Notre Dame	1990-92-93-94-95-96-97-99-2000-01-06-07-08-09-10-11-12-13-14-15-16-17-18-19-21-23-24-25-26	29	26	23	.531	2	3	3	2026
Ohio State	2003-04-08-13-15-25	6	3	6	.333	0	0	0	2025
Penn	1975-77-83-84-85-87-88-89-2004-06-11-14-19-22	14	4	13	.235	0	0	1	2022
Penn State	2003-05-13-17-19-23-24-25-26	9	7	8	.467	0	0	2	2026
Princeton	1990-91-92-93-94-95-96-97-98-99-2000-01-02-03-04-06-07-09-10-12-22-23-24-25-26	25	36	16	.692	7	2	2	2026
Providence	2004-06-07	3	0	3	.000	0	0	0	2007
Quinnipiac	2016	1	1	1	.500	0	0	0	
Richmond	2014-18-19-23-25-26	6	1	5	.167	0	0	0	2026
Robert Morris	2018-19-22-25-26	5	1	5	.167	0	0	0	2026
Rutgers	1972-74-75-84-86-90-91-2003-04-21-22	11	3	10	.231	0	0	0	2022
Sacred Heart	2024	1	0	1	.000	0	0	0	
Saint Joseph's	2022-24	1	0	2	.000	0	0	0	2024
Siena	2009-11-14-25	4	0	4	.000	0	0	0	2025
Stony Brook	2002-10-12-26	4	1	4	.200	0	0	0	2026
Syracuse ^{(a)}	1979-80-81-83-84-85-86-87-88-89-90-91-92-93-94-95-96-97-98-99-2000-01-02-03-04-05-06-08-09-10-11-12-13-14-15-16-24-25-26	39	69	25	.734	11	6	12	2026
Towson	1989-91-92-94-96-2001-03-04-05-07-13-15-16-17-19-24-25	17	12	17	.414	0	1	2	2025
Utah	2023-24	2	0	2	.000	0	0	0	2024
Vermont	2021	1	0	0	.000	0	0	0	
Villanova	2009-11-18	3	0	3	.000	0	0	0	
Virginia	1971-72-73-74-78-79-80-81-82-83-84-85-86-88-90-91-93-94-95-96-97-98-99-2000-01-02-03-05-06-07-08-09-10-11-12-14-15-18-19-21-22-23-24-26	43	54	34	.614	6	4	13	2026
Washington & Lee	1972-73-74-75-76-77-78-80	8	3	8	.273	0	0	3	1980
Yale	1988-90-92-2012-13-15-16-17-18-19-22-23-26	13	10	10	.500	1	1	1	2026

== Notes ==
^{(a)} The NCAA does not recognize Syracuse's participation in the 1990 tournament and therefore recognizes them as participating in 29 tournaments, having a win–loss record of 59–20 (.747 win percentage), and having 10 championships.

^{(b)} No third-place game is held, semifinal losers credited with third-place finish
