= NCAA Division I men's lacrosse tournament all-time team records =

North American collegiate team records

The following is a list of National Collegiate Athletic Association (NCAA) Division I college lacrosse records for the NCAA Division I Men's Lacrosse Championship up through 2026.

== Team performances ==
Team	Championships	Runner-Up	Semifinals
Syracuse (Note: Syracuse's championship in the 1990 tournament was vacated by the NCAA. The NCAA Committee on Infractions determined that Paul Gait had played in the 1990 tournament while ineligible. Under NCAA rules, Syracuse tournament records for that year were vacated.)	10 (1983, 1988, 1989, 1990, 1993, 1995, 2000, 2002, 2004, 2008, 2009)	6 (1984, 1985, 1992, 1999, 2001, 2013)	12 (1980, 1986, 1987, 1991, 1994, 1996, 1997, 1998, 2003, 2006, 2025, 2026)
Johns Hopkins	9 (1974, 1978, 1979, 1980, 1984, 1985, 1987, 2005, 2007)	9 (1972, 1973, 1977, 1981, 1982, 1983, 1989, 2003, 2008)	11 (1976, 1986, 1992, 1993, 1995, 1996, 1999, 2000, 2002, 2004, 2015)
Virginia	7 (1972, 1999, 2003, 2006, 2011, 2019, 2021)	4 (1980, 1986, 1994, 1996)	15 (1973, 1979, 1981, 1982, 1985, 1988, 1995, 2000, 2002, 2005, 2008, 2009, 2010, 2023, 2024)
Princeton	7 (1992, 1994, 1996, 1997, 1998, 2001, 2026)	2 (2000, 2002)	3 (1993, 2004, 2022)
North Carolina	5 (1981, 1982, 1986, 1991, 2016)	1 (1993)	8 (1980, 1983, 1984, 1985, 1989, 1990, 1992, 2021)
Maryland	4 (1973, 1975, 2017, 2022)	14 (1971, 1974, 1976, 1979, 1995, 1997, 1998, 2011, 2012, 2015, 2016, 2021, 2024, 2025)	14 (1972, 1977, 1978, 1983, 1987, 1989, 1991, 2003, 2005, 2006, 2014, 2018, 2022)
Cornell	4 (1971, 1976, 1977, 2025)	5 (1978, 1987, 1988, 2009, 2022 )	7 (1974, 1975, 1982, 2007, 2010, 2013), 2022)
Duke	3 (2010, 2013, 2014)	4 (2005, 2007, 2018, 2023)	8 (1997, 2008, 2009, 2011, 2012, 2019, 2021, 2026)
Notre Dame	2 (2023, 2024)	3 (2010, 2014, 2026)	3 (2001, 2012, 2015)
Loyola	1 (2012)	1 (1990)	2 (1998, 2016)
Yale	1 (2018)	1 (2019)	1 (1990)
Denver	1 (2015)	0	5 (2011, 2013, 2014, 2017, 2024)
Navy	0	2 (1975, 2004)	6 (1971, 1976, 1977, 1978, 1979, 1981)
Towson	0	1 (1991)	2 (2001, 2017)
UMass	0	1 (2006)	0
Ohio State	0	1 (2017)	0
Penn State	0	0	3 (2019, 2023, 2025)
Washington and Lee	0	0	3 (1973, 1974, 1975)
Army	0	0	2 (1971, 1984)
Brown	0	0	2 (1994, 2016)
Albany	0	0	1 (2018)
Cortland	0	0	1 (1972)
Delaware	0	0	1 (2007)
Georgetown	0	0	1 (1999)
Penn	0	0	1 (1988)
Rutgers	0	0	1 (2022)

== Winning percentages ==
Team	NCAAs	W	L	Games	Pct.
Adelphi	4	2	4	6	.333
Air Force	5	1	5	6	.167
Albany	13	8	13	21	.381
Army	19	5	19	24	.208
Boston University	1	0	1	2	.000
Brown	15	7	15	22	.318
Bryant	6	3	6	9	.333
Bucknell	2	0	2	2	.000
Butler	1	0	1	1	.000
Canisius	3	0	3	3	.000
Colgate	4	1	4	5	.200
Cornell	32	40	28	68	.588
Cortland	1	1	1	2	.500
Dartmouth	1	0	1	1	.000
Delaware	8	6	8	14	.429
Denver	13	16	12	28	.571
Detroit Mercy	1	0	1	1	.000
Drexel	2	1	2	3	.333
Duke	28	46	25	71	.648
Fairfield	2	0	2	2	.000
Georgetown	19	14	18	32	.438
Hartford	2	0	2	2	.000
Harvard	8	2	8	10	.200
High Point	2	0	2	2	.000
Hobart	5	0	5	5	.000
Hofstra	17	4	17	21	.190
Jacksonville	1	1	1	2	.500
Johns Hopkins	50	74	41	115	.643
Lehigh	4	0	4	4	.000
LIU Post	1	0	1	1	.000
Loyola	25	18	24	42	.429
Manhattan	2	0	2	2	.000
Marist	5	2	4	6	.333
Marquette	2	0	2	2	.000
Maryland	48	76	43	119	.639
Massachusetts	20	9	20	29	.310
Michigan	2	1	2	3	.333
Michigan State	3	0	3	3	.000
Monmouth	2	0	2	2	.000
Mount St. Mary's	2	0	2	2	.000
Navy	27	17	27	44	.386
New Hampshire	1	0	1	1	.000
North Carolina	35	36	30	66	.545
NC State	1	0	1	1	.000
Notre Dame	29	33	27	60	.550
Ohio State	8	6	8	14	.429
Penn	14	4	14	18	.222
Penn State	9	7	9	16	.438
Princeton	25	37	18	55	.673
Providence	3	0	3	3	.000
Quinnipiac	1	0	1	1	.000
Richmond	7	1	7	8	.125
Robert Morris	5	1	5	6	.167
Rutgers	11	5	11	16	.313
Sacred Heart	1	0	1	1	.000
Saint Joseph's	2	0	2	2	.000
Siena	4	0	4	4	.000
Stony Brook	4	1	4	5	.200
Syracuse	42	70	32	102	.686
Towson	17	12	17	29	.414
UMBC	7	2	7	9	.222
Utah	2	0	2	2	.000
Villanova	3	0	3	3	.000
Vermont	2	0	2	2	.000
Virginia	44	61	37	98	.622
Washington and Lee	8	3	8	11	.273
Yale	13	11	12	23	.478

== Undefeated National Champions ==
There have been 14 undefeated NCAA champions out of 54 title games since 1971.

Year	Winner	Record	Seed	Score	Runner-up	Record	Seed
1973	Maryland	10–0	#1	10–9 OT	Johns Hopkins	11–2	#2
1976	Cornell	16–0	#2	16–13 OT	Maryland	10–1	#1
1977	Cornell	13–0	#1	16–8	Johns Hopkins	11–2	#2
1979	Johns Hopkins	13–0	#1	15–9	Maryland	9–2	#2
1981	North Carolina	12–0	#2	14–13	Johns Hopkins	13–1	#1
1982	North Carolina	14–0	#1	7–5	Johns Hopkins	11–3	#2
1984	Johns Hopkins	14–0	#1	13–10	Syracuse	15–1	#2
1988	Syracuse	15–0	#1	13–8	Cornell	9–6	unseeded
1990	Syracuse	13–0	#1	21–9	Loyola	11–3	#3
1991	North Carolina	16–0	#1	18–13	Towson	12–4	unseeded
1997	Princeton	15–0	#1	19–7	Maryland	11–5	#7
2005	Johns Hopkins	16–0	#1	9–8	Duke	17–3	#2
2006	Virginia	17–0	#1	15–7	UMass	13–5	unseeded
2022	Maryland	18–0	#1	9–7	Cornell	14–5	#7
