= 2007 NCAA Tournament =

This is a list of the 2007 NCAA Tournament winners:

Basketball

- 2007 NCAA Men's Division I Basketball Tournament
- 2007 NCAA Women's Division I Basketball Tournament

Ice hockey

- 2007 NCAA Men's Division I Ice Hockey Tournament

Baseball

- 2007 NCAA Division I baseball tournament

Softball

- 2007 NCAA Division I softball tournament

Men's Lacrosse

- 2007 NCAA Division I Men's Lacrosse Championship
