= 2022 NCAA Division I men's lacrosse tournament =

American college lacrosse tournament

- Teams: 18
- Finals site: Rentschler Field, East Hartford, Connecticut
- Champions: Maryland (4th title)
- Runner-up: Cornell (8th title game)
- Semifinalists: Princeton (11th Final Four); Rutgers (1st Final Four)
- Winning coach: John Tillman (2nd title)
- MOP: Logan McNaney, Maryland
- Attendance: 21,668 semi-finals 22,184 finals 43,852 total

The 2022 NCAA Division I Men's Lacrosse Championship was the 51st annual single-elimination tournament to determine the national championship for National Collegiate Athletic Association (NCAA) Division I men's college lacrosse.

Eighteen teams competed in the tournament based upon their performance during the regular season. For ten teams, entry into the tournament was by means of a conference tournament automatic qualifier, while for the remaining eight teams at-large selection was determined by the NCAA selection committee.

After losing in the championship game the year prior, Maryland won their fourth NCAA-era national championship, capping off an undefeated season and becoming just the 14th undefeated national champion, and the first 18 and 0 team. In the national championship game against Cornell, the Terrapins led 9–2 in the latter stages of the third quarter before Cornell closed the game on a five-goal run. Maryland goalkeeper Logan McNaney made 17 saves.

== Teams ==
Seed	School	Conference	Berth Type	Rank	Record
1	Maryland Terrapins	Big Ten	Automatic		14–0
2	Georgetown Hoyas	Big East	Automatic		15–1
3	Penn Quakers	Ivy League	Automatic		10–4
4	Yale Bulldogs	Ivy League	At-large		11–4
5	Princeton Tigers	Ivy League	At-large		9–4
6	Rutgers Scarlet Knights	Big Ten	At-large		13–3
7	Cornell Big Red	Ivy League	At-large		11–4
8	Brown Bears	Ivy League	At-large		10–5
	Virginia Cavaliers	ACC	At-large		11–3
	Ohio State Buckeyes	Big Ten	At-large		10–5
	Harvard Crimson	Ivy League	At-large		8–4
	Boston University Terriers	Patriot League	Automatic		12–4
	Saint Joseph's Hawks	Northeast	Automatic		14–3
	Richmond Spiders	Southern	Automatic		11–4
	Delaware Fightin' Blue Hens	CAA	Automatic		11–5
	Vermont Catamounts	America East	Automatic		11–6
	Manhattan Jaspers	MAAC	Automatic		8–6
	Robert Morris Colonials	ASUN	Automatic		10–5

== Bracket ==
Play–in game May 11; Burlington, VT
Vermont	15
Manhattan	3

Play–in game May 11; Newark, DE
Delaware	20
Robert Morris	8

First round May 14–15, ESPNU; Hosted by seeded team
1	Maryland	21
Vermont	5
8	Brown	10
Virginia	17
5	Princeton	12
Boston University	5
4	Yale	18
St. Joseph's	16
3	Penn	11*
Richmond	10
6	Rutgers	19
Harvard	9
7	Cornell	15
Ohio State	8
2	Georgetown	9
Delaware	10

Quarterfinals; May 21–22, ESPNU; Hempstead, NY and Columbus, OH
1	Maryland	18
Virginia	9
5	Princeton	14
4	Yale	10
3	Penn	9
6	Rutgers	11
7	Cornell	10
Delaware	8

Semifinals; May 28, ESPN2; East Hartford, CT
1	Maryland	13
5	Princeton	8
6	Rutgers	10
7	Cornell	17

National Championship; May 30, ESPN; East Hartford, CT
1	Maryland (18-0)	9
7	Cornell (14-5)	7

*=denotes overtime

== Tournament boxscores ==
Tournament Finals (5/30/2022 at East Hartford, Conn. Pratt & Whitney Stadium)

Team	1	2	3	4	Total
Maryland (18–0)	4	3	2	0	9
Cornell (14–5)	1	1	1	4	7
Maryland scoring – Anthony DeMaio 4, Logan Wisnauskas 2, Jonathan Donville, Eric Malever, Owen Prybylski; Cornell scoring – CJ Kirst 2, Michael Long, Aiden Blake, Hugh Kelleher, Spencer Wirtheim, John Piatelli; Shots: Cornell 40, Maryland 37; Saves: Maryland Logan McNaney 17, Cornell Chayse Ierlan 9; Attendance: 22,184

Tournament Semi-Finals (5/28/2022 at East Hartford, Conn. Pratt & Whitney Stadium)

Team	1	2	3	4	Total
Maryland	5	2	4	2	13
Princeton (11–5)	1	3	2	2	8
Maryland scoring – Logan Wisnauskas 4, Keegan Khan 3, Owen Murphy 2, Bubba Fairman, Jonathan Donville, Kyle Long, Jack Brennan; Princeton scoring – Alexander Vardaro 2, Alex Slusher, Chris Brown, Christian Ronda, Jamie Atkinson, Luke Crimmins, Coulter Mackesy; Shots: Princeton 47, Maryland 45; Saves: Maryland Logan McNaney 19 - Drew Morris 2, Princeton Erik Peters 13; Attendance: 21,668

Team	1	2	3	4	Total
Cornell	3	5	6	3	17
Rutgers (15–4)	1	2	2	5	10
Cornell scoring – John Piatelli 5, Michael Long 4, CJ Kirst 3, Hugh Kelleher 3, Billy Coyle, Ryan Sheehan; Rutgers scoring – Mitch Bartolo 2, Brian Cameron 2, Dante Kulas, Ross Scott, Ronan Jacoby, Eric Civetti, Ryan Gallagher, Brennan Kamish; Shots: Rutgers 45, Cornell 37; Saves: Cornell Chayse Ierlan 15 - Wyatt Knust 1, Colin Kirst 13; Attendance: 21,668

Tournament Quarterfinals

Team	1	2	3	4	Total
Maryland	4	5	6	3	18
Virginia (12–4)	1	3	3	2	9
Maryland scoring – Owen Murphy 4, Logan Wisnauskas 3, Anthony DeMaio 3, Jonathan Donville 2, Eric Malever, Roman Puglise, Keegan Khan, Kyle Long, Daniel Maltz, Daniel Kelly; Virginia scoring – Jeff Conner 3, Payton Cormier 2, Griffin Schutz 2, Evan Zinn, Matt Moore; Shots: Princeton 47, Maryland 45; Saves: Maryland Logan McNaney 14 - Drew Morris 1, Princeton Matthew Nunes 11 - Miles Thompson 0; Location: Columbus, Ohio (Ohio Stadium) - 5/22/2022; Attendance: 3,684

Team	1	2	3	4	Total
Princeton	4	4	4	2	14
Yale (12–5)	3	2	4	1	10
Princeton scoring – Sam English 3, Christian Ronda 2, Alexander Vardaro 2, Coulter Mackesy 2, Alex Slusher, Chris Brown, Sean Cameron, Jake Stevens, Luke Crimmins; Yale scoring – Brad Sharp 3, Chris Lyons 2, Patrick Hackler, Christian Cropp, Matt Brandau, Thomas Bragg, Max Krevsky; Shots: Princeton 46, Yale 46; Saves: Yale Jared Paquette 20, Princeton Erik Peters 17; Location: Hempstead NY (Shuart Stadium) - 5/21/2022; Attendance: 5,814

Team	1	2	3	4	Total
Rutgers	2	2	2	5	11
Penn (11–5)	0	4	2	3	9
Rutgers scoring – Shane Knobloch 3, Mitch Bartolo 2, Ross Scott, Ronan Jacoby, Ethan Rall, Zackary Franckowiak, Bryant Boswell, Dante Kulas; Penn scoring – Dylan Gergar 4, Cam Rubin, Gabe Furey, Jack Schultz, Robert Schain, Chris Canet; Shots: Rutgers 47, Penn 46; Saves: Rutgers - Colin Kirst 18, Penn - Patric Burkinshaw 14; Location: Hempstead NY (Shuart Stadium) - 5/21/2022; Attendance: 5,814

Team	1	2	3	4	Total
Cornell	3	2	2	3	10
Delaware (13–6)	4	0	3	1	8
Cornell scoring – John Piatelli 3, Spencer Wirtheim 2, Michael Long, Billy Coyle, Matt Licciardi, CJ Kirst, Angelo Petrakis; Delaware scoring – Tye Kurtz 5, Clay Miller 2, Owen Grant; Shots: Delaware 39, Cornell 37; Saves: Cornell Chayse Ierlan 15, Delaware Matt Kilkeary 12; Location: Columbus, Ohio (Ohio Stadium) - 5/22/2022; Attendance: 3,684

Tournament First Round

Team	1	2	3	4	Total
Maryland	3	9	6	3	21
Vermont (12–7)	1	1	1	2	5
Maryland scoring – Logan Wisnauskas 4, Anthony DeMaio 3, Owen Murphy 3, Keegan Khan 2, Jack Koras 2, Jonathan Donville, Eric Malever, Gabe Goforth, Ajax Zappitello, Ryan Siracusa, Jack Brennan, Daniel Kelly; Vermont scoring – James Basile, David Closterman, Brock Haley, Liam Limoges, Michael McCormack; Shots: Maryland 46, Vermont 37, Saves: Maryland Logan McNaney 11 - Drew Morris 6, Vermont Ryan Cornell 12 - Matt Shaffer 0; Location: College Park, MD (COF @ MD Stadium) - 5/15/2022; Attendance: 2,672

Team	1	2	3	4	Total
Virginia	3	4	6	4	17
Brown (10–6)	4	3	2	1	10
Virginia scoring – Payton Cormier 5, Connor Shellenberger 4, Matt Moore 2, Xander Dickson 2, Petey LaSalla, Jack Peele, Scott Bower, Ben Wayer; Brown scoring – Brian Antonelli 2, Ryan Aughavin, Devon McLane, Griffin King, Trevor Glavin, Reed Moshyedi, Nolen Rockefeller, Ryan Behrens, Adrian Enchill; Shots: Virginia 46, Brown 44; Saves: Virginia Matthew Nunes 16, Brown Connor Theriault 9; Location: Providence, R.I. (Stevenson-Pincince Field) - 5/14/2022; Attendance: 3,200

Team	1	2	3	4	Total
Princeton	4	2	3	3	12
Boston (12–6)	0	2	1	2	5
Princeton scoring – Alex Slusher 3, Christian Ronda 3, Sam English 3, Pace Billings, Alexander Vardaro, Coulter Mackesy; Boston scoring – Tommy Bourque 3, Christian Quadrino, Robert Gallop; Shots: Princeton 43, Boston 30; Saves: Princeton Erik Peters 15, Boston Matt Garber 9; Location: Princeton, N.J. (Sherrerd Field) - 5/14/2022; Attendance: 1,037

Team	1	2	3	4	Total
Yale	4	4	7	3	18
Saint Joseph's (14–4)	3	6	4	3	16
Yale scoring – Leo Johnson 4, Matt Brandau 4, Chris Lyons 3, Johnny Keib, Brian Tevlin, Brad Sharp, Jack Monfort, Patrick Hackler, James Ball, Thomas Bragg; Saint Joseph's scoring – Matt Bohmer 3, Levi Anderson 3, Tucker Brown 3, Colin Reich 2, Levi Verch 2, Carter Page 2, Austin Strazzulla; Shots: Yale 42, Saint Joseph's 45; Saves: Yale Jared Paquette 16, Saint Joseph's Robbie Seeley 9; Location: New Haven, Conn. (Reese Stadium) - 5/14/2022; Attendance: 1,400

Team	1	2	3	4	OT	Total
Penn	5	2	1	2	1	11
Richmond (11–5)	2	4	2	2	0	10
Penn scoring – Ben Smith 5, Sam Handley 3, Dylan Gergar 2, Cam Rubin; Richmond scoring – Dalton Young 3, Ryan Dunn 2, Lance Madonna, Ryan Lanchbury, Luke Frankeny, Joe Gooley, Braden Mcclure; Shots: Penn 39, Richmond 35; Saves: Penn Patrick Burkinshaw 15, Richmond Zach Vigue 11; Location: Philadelphia PA (Penn Park) - 5/14/2022; Attendance: 2,061

Team	1	2	3	4	Total
Rutgers	4	3	6	6	19
Harvard (8–5)	1	4	2	2	9
Rutgers scoring – Ross Scott 8, Mitch Bartolo 3, Brian Cameron 3, Shane Knobloch 2, Sam Stephan, Ronan Jacoby, Ryan Gallagher; Harvard scoring – Owen Gaffney 2, Austin Madronic 2, Andrew Perry 2, Hayden Cheek, Sam King, Andrew O'Berry; Shots: Rutgers 47, Harvard 36; Saves: Rutgers Colin Kirst 17 - Stephen Russo 0, Harvard Kyle Mullin 13; Location: Piscataway, N.J. (Yurcak Field) - 5/15/2022; Attendance: 5,212

Team	1	2	3	4	Total
Cornell	0	4	6	5	15
Ohio State (10–6)	4	1	1	2	8
Cornell scoring – CJ Kirst 7, John Piatelli 4, Michael Long, Billy Coyle, Chayse Ierlan, Hugh Kelleher; Ohio State scoring – Jack Myers 2, Colby Smith 2, Ed Shean, Zach Ludd, Jackson Reid, Tyler Gallagher; Shots: Cornell 43, Ohio State 32; Saves: Cornell Chayse Ierlan 13, Ohio State Skylar Wahlund 14; Location: Ithaca, N.Y. (Schoellkopf Field) - 5/15/2022; Attendance: 2,149

Team	1	2	3	4	Total
Delaware	4	1	1	4	10
Georgetown (15–2)	3	3	2	1	9
Delaware scoring – Delaware Goals: JP Ward 2, Drew Lenkaitis 2, Mike Robinson 2, Tye Kurtz, Nick Jessen, Clay Miller, Mark Bieda; Georgetown scoring – Graham Bundy Jr. 3, Alex Trippi 2, Declan McDermott, TJ Haley, Connor Morin, James Reilly; Shots: Delaware 36, Georgetown 46; Saves: Delaware Matt Kilkeary 14, Georgetown Owen McElroy 12; Location: Washington, D.C. (Cooper Field) - 5/15/2022; Attendance: 1,873

== Record by conference ==
Conference	# of Bids	Record	Win %	PG	R16	QF	SF	CG	NC
NEC	1	0–1	.000		1				
Big Ten	3	6–2	.750		3	2	2	1	1
Big East	1	0–1	.000		1				
Patriot	1	0–1	.000		1				
CAA	1	2–1	.667	1	1	1			
Ivy League	6	7–5	.583		6	4	2	1	
America East	1	1–1	.500	1	1				
SoCon	1	0–1	.000		1				
MAAC	1	0–1	.000	1					
ASUN	1	0–1	.000	1					
ACC	1	1–1	.500		1	1			

== All-Tournament Team ==
Logan McNaney, Maryland (Most Outstanding Player)
Anthony DeMaio, Maryland
Luke Wierman, Maryland
Ajax Zappitello, Maryland
Ross Scott, Rutgers
Logan Wisnauskas Maryland
John Piatelli Cornell
Gavin Adler Cornell
CJ Kirst Cornell
Pace Billings Princeton
