= Kevin Warne =

American college lacrosse coach

Current position
- Title: Head Coach
- Team: Georgetown Hoyas

Biographical details
- Education: Hofstra

Coaching career (HC unless noted)
- 2001–2004: Delaware (assistant)
- 2005–2007: UMBC (assistant)
- 2008–2010: Harvard (assistant)
- 2011–2012: Maryland (assistant)
- 2013-present: Georgetown

Kevin Warne is an American college lacrosse coach. He is currently the head coach of the Georgetown Hoyas men's lacrosse team.

== Playing career ==
Warne played college lacrosse at Hofstra University where he was a four-year letter winner, 2-time All-America East selection, and honorable mention All-American. He graduated in 2000.

== Coaching career ==
Warne was hired as head coach at Georgetown in 2013. Since his hiring, Warne has led the Hoyas to NCAA tournament appearances in 2018, 2019, 2021, 2022, 2023, 2024, 2025, and 2026.

Prior to becoming head coach at Georgetown, Warne had a long coaching career as a defensive coordinator, being an assistant coach at UMBC (2005–07), Harvard (2008–10) and Maryland (2011–12).

Before working at UMBC as an assistant coach, Warne served as an assistant coach at the University of Delaware from 2001 to 2004, working with the offense.
