= Saint Joseph's Hawks men's lacrosse =

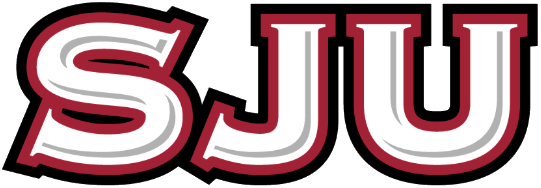
- Founded: 1992; 34 years ago
- University: Saint Joseph's University
- Head coach: Scott Meehan (1st season)
- Stadium: Sweeney Field (capacity: 3,000)
- Location: Philadelphia, Pennsylvania
- Conference: Atlantic 10
- Nickname: Hawks
- Colors: Crimson and gray

NCAA Tournament appearances
- (2) – 2022, 2024

Conference Tournament championships
- (3) – 2000, 2022, 2024

Conference regular season championships
- (10) – 2000, 2007, 2014, 2015, 2016, 2018, 2021, 2022, 2023, 2024

The Saint Joseph's men's lacrosse team represents Saint Joseph's University in National Collegiate Athletic Association (NCAA) Division I men's lacrosse. Since 2023, they have competed in the Atlantic 10 Conference as full members. They play home games at Sweeney Field in Wynnefield, Philadelphia

== History ==
Saint Joseph's was elevated to the varsity level in 1992 after competing several years at club level. They played their first season in 1993 as an independent. The Hawks saw some early success after joining the MAAC in 1997. In 2000, St. Joe's was the number one seed in the MAAC year-end tournament, where they would go on to win their first MAAC Championship, defeating Manhattan 17-7.

St. Joe's competed as members of the MAAC until 2010. For the 2011-2013 seasons, the Hawks competed in the CAA. From 2014 to 2022, they competed in the NEC, before their full-time conference, the Atlantic 10 added lacrosse in 2023.

Taylor Wray took over as head coach in 2012 and instantly turned the program around. In his third season, St. Joe’s won 11 games and went undefeated in conference play. From 2015 to 2022, the Hawks would go to the NEC Championship Game five times. St. Joe’s won the NEC in 2022, defeating Hobart 14-7. This win sent the Hawks to their first NCAA Tournament, where they fell 18-16 to 4-seeded Yale. The Hawks won the 2024 A10 Championship, defeating Richmond 17-13, and securing the A10's auto-bid to the NCAA Tournament. After this win, the Hawks were ranked #13 going into the tournament, their highest ranking in program history. They went on to lose to #5 ranked Virginia in the opening round.

== Annual record ==
The following is a list of Saint Joseph's results by season as an NCAA Division I program:

Season	Coach	Overall	Conference	Standing	Postseason
Pat Dennin (Independent) (1993–1996)
1993	Pat Dennin	3-11			
1994	Pat Dennin	7-8			
1995	Pat Dennin	3-10			
1996	Pat Dennin	4-11			
Pat Dennin (Metro Atlantic Athletic Conference) (1997–1998)
1997	Pat Dennin	8–6	6-2	3rd	
1998	Pat Dennin	6-9	4-3	T-3rd	
Pat Dennin:		31-55 (.360)	10-5 (.667)		
Paul Perdue (Metro Atlantic Athletic Conference) (1999–2004)
1999	Paul Perdue	7-8	6-2	T-2nd	
2000	Paul Perdue	12-4	9-0	1st	MAAC Champions
2001	Paul Perdue	5-9	5-4	T–4th	
2002	Paul Perdue	4-10	4-3	4th	
2003	Paul Perdue	6-9	5-3	T-3rd	MAAC Finals
2004	Paul Perdue	4-10	3-5	6th	
Paul Perdue:		38-50 (.432)	32-17 (.653)		
Pat Cullinan (Metro Atlantic Athletic Conference) (2005–2010)
2005	Pat Cullinan	3-11	2-6	T–7th	
2006	Pat Cullinan	6–9	5-3	4th	
2007	Pat Cullinan	6-12	5-3	T–1st	MAAC Finals
2008	Pat Cullinan	4-11	4-4	T-4th	
2009	Pat Cullinan	6-9	4-4	T-5th	
2010	Pat Cullinan	3-12	3-5	6th	
Pat Cullinan (Coastal Athletic Association) (2011–2011)
2011	Pat Cullinan	0-12	0-6	7th	
Pat Cullinan:		28-76 (.269)	23-31 (.426)		
Taylor Wray (Coastal Athletic Association) (2012–2013)
2012	Taylor Wray	6–9	1-5	7th	
2013	Taylor Wray	7-8	1-5	7th	
Taylor Wray (Northeast Conference) (2014–2022)
2014	Taylor Wray	11-4	6-0	1st	NEC Finals
2015	Taylor Wray	11-6	6-0	1st	NEC Finals
2016	Taylor Wray	12-4	5-1	1st	NEC Finals
2017	Taylor Wray	5-9	2-4	5th	
2018	Taylor Wray	11-4	6-0	1st	NEC Finals
2019	Taylor Wray	7-7	3-3	5th	
2020	Taylor Wray	5-2	†	†	†
2021	Taylor Wray	9-4	8-0	1st	NEC Finals
2022	Taylor Wray	14-4	7-0	1st	NEC Title, NCAA Division I First Round
Taylor Wray (Atlantic 10) (2023–2025)
2023	Taylor Wray	10-5	5-0	1st	A10 Semifinals
2024	Taylor Wray	12-4	5-0	1st	A10 Title, NCAA Division I First Round
2025	Taylor Wray	9-6	2-3	3rd	A10 Semifinals
Taylor Wray:		127-79 (.617)	57-21 (.731)		
Scott Meehan (Atlantic 10) (2026–present)
2026	Scott Meehan	7-6	3-3	3	A10 Finals
Scott Meehan:		7-6 (.538)	3-3 (.500)		
Total:		231–266 (.465)			
National champion Postseason invitational champion Conference regular season champion Conference regular season and conference tournament champion Division regular season champion Division regular season and conference tournament champion Conference tournament champion

†NCAA canceled 2020 collegiate activities due to the COVID-19 virus

== All-Americans ==
=== First-Team ===
- Zach Cole, FO (2022)

=== Third-Team ===
- Zach Cole, FO (2021)

=== Honorable Mention ===
- Michael Rastivo, A (2016)
- Levi Anderson, M (2023)
- Levi Verch, D (2023, 2024, 2025)

== Professional Players(PLL/NLL/MLL) ==
St. Joe's has sent several players to the various professional box and field lacrosse leagues over the past three decades as a program. Since the formation of the league in 2019, St. Joe's has had three PLL draft picks.

Levi Anderson, the all-time points leader on Hawk Hill, has been the most notable professional player. Anderson was drafted by the California Redwoods in 2024, but was traded to the Maryland Whipsnakes before playing in a game. Anderson finished his rookie season with 13 points in 7 games and 3 goals in the postseason, including the overtime game-winner against the Atlas in the Semifinals.

Anderson was the first Hawk to play in both the PLL and the NLL. He was selected in the first round by the Saskatchewan Rush and continues to play in both leagues. In 2024, the Rush made it to the NLL Finals, falling to the Buffalo Bandits 2 games to 1.

=== Active ===
Year Drafted	Name	Position	Height	Weight	Drafted By	Draft Pick	Current Team
Premier Lacrosse League
2024	Levi Anderson	Midfield	6'4	220	California Redwoods (Note: Levi Anderson was traded to the Maryland Whipsnakes before playing in a PLL game.)	3rd round (21st overall)	New York Atlas
2025	Levi Verch	Defense	6'2	219	Carolina Chaos	2nd round (13th overall)	Carolina Chaos
2026	Richie LaCalandra	Attack	5'11	177	New York Atlas (Undrafted)	Undrafted	New York Atlas
National Lacrosse League
2023	Toron Eccleston (Note: Toron Eccleston was drafted in 2023 after his senior season at Lenoir-Rhyne. He chose to transfer to St. Joe's and play his last year of eligibility with the Hawks. After the 2024 season, the Swarm maintained its draft rights to Eccleston, and he debuted for the team on January 10th.)	Forward	6'4	210	Georgia Swarm	1st round (6th overall)	Georgia Swarm
2023	Levi Anderson	Forward	6'4	220	Saskatchewan Rush	1st round (12th overall)	Saskatchewan Rush
2024	Carter Page	Forward	6'1	181	Georgia Swarm	2nd round (23rd overall)	Georgia Swarm
2025	Levi Verch	Defense	6'2	219	Saskatchewan Rush	1st round (13th overall)	Saskatchewan Rush

=== Former ===
Year Drafted	Name	Position	Drafted By	Draft Pick
National Lacrosse League
1998	Marc Schaffer	Defense	Philadelphia Wings	6th round (43rd overall)
2001	Randy McNeil	Forward	Buffalo Bandits	7th round (87th overall)
2017	Anthony Joaquim	Defense	New England Black Wolves	1st Round (8th overall)
2022	Zach Cole	Defense/ Faceoff	Las Vegas Desert Dogs	3rd Round (44th overall)
Major League Lacrosse
2018	Kyle Cain	Midfield	Ohio Machine	Undrafted
2020	Anthony Joaquim	SSDM	Philadelphia Barrage	Supplemental
Premier Lacrosse League
2023	Zach Cole	Faceoff	Redwoods LC	4th round (26th Overall)
2024	Carter Page	Attack	Philadelphia Waterdogs	Undrafted

== See also ==
- Lacrosse in Pennsylvania
