= Manhattan Jaspers men's lacrosse =

- Founded: 1996
- University: Manhattan University
- Head coach: Doug Sage
- Stadium: Gaelic Park
- Location: New York City, New York, United States
- Nickname: Jaspers
- Colors: Green and white

NCAA Tournament appearances
- 2002, 2022

Conference Tournament championships
- 2002, 2022

The Manhattan Jaspers men's lacrosse team represents Manhattan University in New York City, New York. The Jaspers are coached by Doug Sage and play their home games at Gaelic Park in Riverdale, New York. Manhattan currently competes as a member of the Metro Atlantic Athletic Conference (MAAC).

== History ==
The Manhattan men's lacrosse program began in 1996 and as of the 2023 season has compiled a 141-243 all-time record. Since 1996, it has competed in the MAAC.

In 2002, the Jaspers won the program's first-ever MAAC conference tournament title, defeating Saint Joseph's 11-3 in the semifinals and Mount St. Mary's 9-8 in the finals. The 2002 Manhattan team compiled a 11-6 overall regular season record and a perfect 7-0 regular season conference record. In the 2002 NCAA Division I men's lacrosse tournament, Manhattan would fall in the first round to Georgetown 12-7. In 2018, the 2002 Manhattan men's lacrosse team was inducted into the Manhattan University Athletic Hall of Fame.

In 2022, Manhattan won the team's second MAAC conference tournament title, defeating Marist in the semifinals 13-12 (OT) and St. Bonaventure in the finals 8-7. Manhattan's 2022 MAAC title came 20 years after their first conference tournament championship in 2002. The 2022 team was 8-7 during the regular season and 4-2 in MAAC play. At the 2022 NCAA Division I men's lacrosse tournament, the Jaspers lost to Vermont in the play-in game.

Manhattan has been conference champions twice (2002, 2022) and conference runner-ups five times (2000, 2004, 2009, 2021, 2024).
