= Sacred Heart Pioneers men's lacrosse =

Sacred Heart Pioneers
- Founded: 1991 (varsity)
- University: Sacred Heart University
- Head coach: Jon Basti (since season)
- Stadium: Campus Field (capacity: 10,500)
- Location: Fairfield, Connecticut
- Conference: MAAC
- Nickname: Pioneers
- Colors: Red and white

NCAA Tournament appearances
- 2024

Conference Tournament championships
- (3) – 2000, 2022, 2024

Conference regular season championships
- 2024

The Sacred Heart men's lacrosse team represents Sacred Heart University in National Collegiate Athletic Association (NCAA) Division I men's lacrosse. The Pioneers started up a varsity level team in 1991. Home games are played at Campus Field in Fairfield, Connecticut.

== History ==
Sacred Heart competes as a member of the MAAC conference, they moved from the Northeast Conference in 2023, and previously were in the CAA.

In 2024, Sacred Heart earned their first Conference Championship and NCAA tournament invitation. They lost to University of Albany 13-7 in the NCAAs. Pioneers were unbeaten in MAAC conference play in 2024.

Sacred Heart has an all-time record of 162 wins and 224 losses (.420).

== Annual record ==
Year	Wins	Losses	Percent	Conference (Record)	Playoffs	National Rank	SOS	RPI	Power Rating
2024	13	5	.722	1st (9-0)	MAAC Title, NCAA Tournament ^{(2)}		20	15	18
2023	5	10	.333				41	30	22
2022	3	10	.231				47	16	25
2021	1	12	.077				54	24	33
2020	5	2	.714				27	18	30
2019	9	6	.600				59	52	50
2018	7	8	.467				54	31	30
2017	9	6	.600				53	50	51
2016	2	14	.750				65	30	22
2015	6	7	.417				59	35	29
2014	6	4	.400				64	33	31

^{(1)} Laxpower / LaxBytes Power Ratings / Massey Ratings / NCAA RPI
^{(2)} Defeated Manhattan 11-5 in MAAC tournament finals. Lost to Albany in NCAAs 13-7.
