= 2023 NCAA Division I men's lacrosse tournament =

Lacrosse tournament in Philadelphia

- Teams: 17
- Finals site: Lincoln Financial Field, Philadelphia, Pennsylvania
- Champions: Notre Dame (1st title)
- Runner-up: Duke (7th title game)
- Semifinalists: Penn State (2nd Final Four); Virginia (23rd Final Four)
- MOP: Liam Entenmann, Notre Dame
- Attendance: 32,107 semi-finals

The 2023 NCAA Division I Men's Lacrosse Championship was the 52nd annual single-elimination tournament to determine the national championship for NCAA Division I men's college lacrosse. The tournament was hosted by Drexel University and held at Lincoln Financial Field in Philadelphia, Pennsylvania.

== Format ==
Seventeen teams competed in the tournament based upon their performance during the regular season. For nine conferences, entry into the tournament was by means of a conference tournament automatic qualifier, while for ACC teams and the remaining eight teams, at-large selection was determined by the NCAA selection committee.

== Teams ==
Seed	School	Conference	Berth Type	RPI	Record
1	Duke Blue Devils	ACC	At-large	1	13–2
2	Virginia Cavaliers	ACC	At-large	3	11–3
3	Notre Dame Fighting Irish	ACC	At-large	2	10–2
4	Maryland Terrapins	Big Ten	At-large	6	10–5
5	Penn State Nittany Lions	Big Ten	At-large	7	9–4
6	Johns Hopkins Blue Jays	Big Ten	At-large	4	11–5
7	Georgetown Hoyas	Big East	Automatic	5	12–3
8	Cornell Big Red	Ivy League	At-large	8	11–3
	Delaware Fightin' Blue Hens	CAA	Automatic	26	12–4
	Marist Red Foxes	MAAC	Automatic	40	10–7
	Michigan Wolverines	Big Ten	Automatic	12	9–6
	Richmond Spiders	Atlantic 10	Automatic	21	11–4
	Yale Bulldogs	Ivy League	At-large	9	9–5
	Princeton Tigers	Ivy League	Automatic	13	8–6
	Army Black Knights	Patriot League	Automatic	16	11–5
	Bryant Bulldogs	America East	Automatic	19	12–4
	Utah Utes	ASUN	Automatic	14	12–4

== Bracket ==
Play–in game May 10; Newark, DE
Delaware	25
Marist	10

First round May 13–14, ESPNU; Hosted by seeded team
1	Duke	12
Delaware	11
8	Cornell	14
Michigan	15*
5	Penn State	13
Princeton	12
4	Maryland	15
Army	16
3	Notre Dame	20
Utah	7
6	Johns Hopkins	22
Bryant	8
7	Georgetown	19
Yale	17
2	Virginia	17
Richmond	8

Quarterfinals; May 20–21, ESPNU; Annapolis, MD and Albany, NY
1	Duke	15
Michigan	8
5	Penn State	10
Army	9
3	Notre Dame	12
6	Johns Hopkins	9
7	Georgetown	14
2	Virginia	17

Semifinals; May 27, ESPN2; Philadelphia, PA
1	Duke	16*
5	Penn State	15
3	Notre Dame	13*
2	Virginia	12

National Championship; May 29, ESPN; Philadelphia, PA
1	Duke	9
3	Notre Dame	13

* denotes overtime period

== Tournament boxscores ==
Tournament Final

Team	1	2	3	4	Total
Notre Dame	3	3	3	4	13
Duke (11–5)	1	0	6	2	9
Notre Dame scoring: Eric Dobson 2, Chris Kavanagh 2, Quinn McCahon 2, Jeffery Ricciardelli 2, Jake Taylor 2, Brian Tevlin 2, Jack Simmons; Duke scoring: Garrett Leadmon 2, Charles Balsamo, Jake Caputo, Owen Caputo, Aidan Danenza, Jack Gray, Brennan O'Neill, Dyson Williams; Shots: Duke 47, Notre Dame 40; Saves: Notre Dame Liam Entenmann 18, Duke William Helm 10; Location: Philadelphia, Pa. (The Linc) – 5/29/2023; Attendance: 30,462

Tournament Semifinals

Team	1	2	3	4	OT	Total
Duke	6	3	4	2	1	16
Penn State (11–5)	4	3	5	3	0	15
Duke scoring: Garrett Leadmon 3, Brennan O'Neill 3, Charles Balsamo 2, Tommy Schelling 2, Dyson Williams 2, Jake Naso 2, Jadon Kerry, Aidan Danenza; Penn State scoring: TJ Malone 6, Matt Traynor 2, Jeb Brenfleck, Jack Traynor, Luke Mercer, Ethan Long, Mac Costin, Jake Morin, Kevin Winkoff; Shots: Duke 41, Penn State 29; Saves: Duke William Helm 6, Penn State Jack Fracyon 12; Location: Philadelphia, Pa. (The Linc) – 5/27/2023; Attendance: 32,107

Team	1	2	3	4	OT	Total
Notre Dame	4	2	2	4	1	13
Virginia (13–4)	3	3	3	3	0	12
Notre Dame scoring: Eric Dobson 4, Pat Kavanagh 2, Jack Simmons 2, Jake Taylor 2, Brian Tevlin, Ben Ramsey, Chris Kavanagh; Virginia scoring: Connor Shellenberger 3, Patrick McIntosh 2, Xander Dickson, Thomas McConvey, Petey LaSalla, Payton Cormier, Griffin Schutz, Grayson Sallade, Peter Garno; Shots: Notre Dame 49, Virginia 37; Saves: Notre Dame Liam Entenmann 11, Virginia Matthew Nunes 17; Location: Philadelphia, Pa. (The Linc) – 5/27/2023; Attendance: 32,107

Tournament Quarterfinals

Team	1	2	3	4	Total
Notre Dame	4	3	3	2	12
Johns Hopkins (12–6)	3	1	2	3	9
Notre Dame scoring: Jack Simmons 3, Jake Taylor 3, Chris Kavanagh 3, Jalen Seymour 2, Eric Dobson; Johns Hopkins scoring: Matt Collison 2, Russell Melendez 2, Garrett Degnon 2, Johnathan Peshko 2, Nick Kaufman; Shots: Notre Dame 43, Johns Hopkins 31; Saves: Notre Dame Liam Entenmann 10, Johns Hopkins Tim Marcille 6; Location: Annapolis, Md. (Navy-Marine Corps Stadium) – 5/21/2023; Attendance: 13,354

Team	1	2	3	4	Total
Penn State	4	3	2	1	10
Army	2	1	3	3	9
Penn State scoring: TJ Malone 4, Matt Traynor 2, Luke Mercer 1, Mac Costin, Mark Sickler, Kevin Winkoff; Army scoring: Gunnar Fellows 3, Jacob Morin 2, Bailey O'Connor, Will Coletti, Reese Burek, Finn McCullough; Shots: Army 43, Penn State 27; Saves: Penn State Jack Fracyon 11, Army Knox Dent 8; Location: Annapolis, Md. (Navy-Marine Corps Stadium) – 5/21/2023; Attendance: 13,354

Team	1	2	3	4	Total
Virginia	7	3	5	2	17
Georgetown (13–4)	4	5	2	3	14
Virginia scoring: Connor Shellenberger 6, Xander Dickson 2, Payton Cormier 2, Griffin Schutz 2, Jeff Conner, Thomas McConvey, Will Cory, Noah Chizmar, Truitt Sunderland, Evan Zinn; Georgetown scoring: Brian Minicus 4, Tucker Dordevic 2, Graham Bundy Jr. 2, Nicky Solomon 2, Aidan Carroll 2, Will Godine; Shots: Virginia 40, Georgetown 35; Saves: Virginia Matthew Nunes 13 – David Roselle 1, Georgetown Danny Hincks 11; Location: Albany, N.Y. (Casey Stadium) – 5/20/2023; Attendance: 4,224

Team	1	2	3	4	Total
Duke	2	5	4	4	15
Michigan (10–7)	2	2	2	2	8
Duke scoring: Brennan O'Neill 6, Andrew McAdorey 3, Dyson Williams 3, Garrett Leadmon, Owen Caputo, Tommy Schelling; Michigan scoring: Peter Thompson 2, Josh Zawada 2, Jacob Jackson 2, Bryce Clay, Isaac Aronson; Shots: Michigan 38, Duke 36; Saves: Duke William Helm 14 – Andrew Bonafede 0, Michigan Hunter Taylor 8 – Shane Carr 2; Location: Albany, N.Y. (Casey Stadium) – 5/20/2023; Attendance: 4,224

Tournament First Round

Team	1	2	3	4	Total
Virginia	5	5	4	3	17
Richmond (11–5)	2	2	2	2	8
Virginia scoring: Payton Cormier 6, Connor Shellenberger 2, Xander Dickson 2, Jeff Conner, Thomas McConvey, Griffin Schutz, Will Cory, Noah Chizmar, Truitt Sunderland, Evan Zinn; Richmond scoring: Derrek Madonna 3, Dalton Young 2, Lance Madonna, Aidan O'Neil, Luke Grayum; Shots: Richmond 35, Virginia 33; Saves: Virginia Matthew Nunes 9 – David Roselle 0, Richmond Zach Vigue 10; Attendance: 2,465

Team	1	2	3	4	Total
Notre Dame	8	4	4	4	20
Utah (12–5)	0	3	2	2	7
Notre Dame scoring: Jake Taylor 5, Reilly Gray 3, Pat Kavanagh 3, Griffin Westlin 2, Chris Kavanagh 2, Jeffery Ricciardelli, Fulton Bayman, Ben Ramsey, Jalen Seymour, Ross Burgmaster; Utah scoring: Jared Andreala 3, Ryan Stines, Tyler Bradbury, Trey Akabane, Carson Moyer; Shots: Notre Dame 49, Utah 37; Saves: Notre Dame Liam Entenmann 13 – Alex Zepf 3, Utah Colin Lenskold 7 – Zack Johns 2; Attendance: 2,145

Team	1	2	3	4	Total
Georgetown	3	7	5	4	19
Yale (9–6)	8	1	6	2	17
Georgetown scoring: Tucker Dordevic 6, Nicky Solomon 5, Brian Minicus 4, Graham Bundy Jr. 2, Will Godine, Aidan Carroll; Yale scoring: Chris Lyons 4, Leo Johnson 3, Matt Brandau 3, Max Krevsky 2, Logan Soelberg, Kyle Zawadzki, Patrick Hackler, Thomas Bragg, Carson Kuhl; Shots: Georgetown 50, Yale 42; Saves: Georgetown Danny Hincks 10, Yale Jared Paquette 12; Attendance: 1,683

Team	1	2	3	4	Total
Army	7	1	3	5	16
Maryland (10–6)	2	6	4	3	15
Army scoring: Gunnar Fellows 3, Ryan Sposito 2, Finn McCullough 2, Jacob Morin 2, Evan Plunkett, Avi Mehl, Reese Burek, Mike Tangredi, John Manero, Andrew Kelly, Dawson Clark; Maryland scoring: Braden Erksa 4, Eric Spanos 2, Daniel Maltz 2, Daniel Kelly 2, Brett Makar, Zach Whittier, Jack Koras, Ryan Siracusa, Luke Wierman; Shots: Maryland 47, Army 32; Saves: Army Knox Dent 16, Maryland Brian Ruppel 5; Attendance: 1,932

Team	1	2	3	4	Total
Johns Hopkins	3	9	7	3	22
Bryant (12–5)	3	0	1	4	8
Johns Hopkins scoring: Russell Melendez 5, Brooks English 3, Jacob Angelus 2, Garrett Degnon 2, Stuart Phillips, Alex Mazzone, Brendan Grimes, Matt Collison, Cameron Chauvette, Jakson Raposo, Ian Krampf, Matt Narewski, Patrick Deans, Koleton Marquis; Bryant scoring: Aidan Goltz 3, Timmy Hacket 2, Connor McMahon, Johnny Hackett, Ryan Dobrzynski; Shots: Johns Hopkins 53, Bryant 36; Saves: Johns Hopkins Tim Marcille 7 – Gib Versfeld 7, Bryant Teagan Alexander 12 – Brennan Hart 1; Location: Baltimore, Maryland (Homewood Field) – 5/14/2023; Attendance: 1,458

Team	1	2	3	4	OT	Total
Michigan	4	3	2	5	1	15
Cornell (11–4)	4	2	1	7	0	14
Michigan scoring: Peter Thompson 4, Michael Boehm 3, Isaac Aronson 2, Josh Zawada 2, Jake Bonomi 2, Aidan Mulholland, Justin Wietfeldt; Cornell scoring: Billy Coyle 3, Hugh Kelleher 3, CJ Kirst 2, Aiden Blake 2, Spencer Wirtheim, Jack Cascadden, Michael Long, Andrew Dalton; Shots: Cornell 46, Michigan 41; Saves: Michigan Hunter Taylor 16, Cornell Chayse Ierlan 11; Location: ( Stadium) – 5/14/2023; Attendance: 2,625

Team	1	2	3	4	Total
Duke	3	2	4	3	12
Delaware (13–5)	5	3	1	2	11
Duke scoring: Andrew McAdorey 3, Dyson Williams 3, Aidan Danenza 2, Garrett Leadmon, Charlie O'Connor, Aidan Maguire, Brennan O'Neill; Delaware scoring: Tye Kurtz 4, JP Ward 2, Mike Robinson 2, Brendan Powers, Jason Kolar, Cam Acchione; Shots: Duke 45, Delaware 30; Saves: Duke William Helm 11, Delaware Matt Kilkeary 15; Location: Durham, North Carolina (Koskinen Stadium) – 5/14/2023; Attendance: 1,371

Team	1	2	3	4	Total
Penn State	1	5	5	2	13
Princeton (8–7)	4	5	0	3	12
Penn State scoring: Ethan Long 5, TJ Malone 2, Kevin Winkoff 2, Jeb Brenfleck, Jack Traynor, Matt Traynor, Mark Sickler; Princeton scoring: Coulter Mackesy 6, Alexander Vardaro 2, Alex Slusher, Sean Cameron, Jake Stevens, John Dunphey; Shots: Penn State 35, Princeton 46; Saves: Penn State Jack Fracyon 16, Princeton Michael Gianforcaro 8; Location: University Park, Pa. (Panzer Stadium) – 5/14/2023; Attendance: 1,683

Tournament Play In

Team	1	2	3	4	Total
Delaware	5	9	8	3	25
Marist (10–8)	3	2	2	3	10
Delaware scoring: Mike Robinson 7, Tye Kurtz 5, JP Ward 4, Nick Jessen 3, Cam Acchione 3, Finn Morgan, Jason Kolar, Riar Schell; Marist scoring: Kellen Pulera 2, Jake Deacy 2, Dylan Bedell, Jamison Embury, Hunter Embury, James Lyons, Stephen Bickel, Jojo Pirreca; Shots: Delaware 64, Marist 25; Saves: Delaware Matt Kilkeary 9, Marist Daniel O'Meara 12; Attendance: 1,857

== Record by conference ==
Conference	# of Bids	Record	Win %	PG	R16	QF	SF	CG	NC
ACC	3	9–2	.818	–	3	3	3	2	1
Big Ten	4	4–3	.571	–	4	3	1	–	–
Big East	1	1–1	.500	–	1	1	–	–	–
Patriot	1	1–1	.500	–	1	1	–	–	–
CAA	1	1–1	.500	1	1	–	–	–	–
Ivy League	3	0–3	.000	–	3	–	–	–	–
America East	1	0–1	.000	–	1	–	–	–	–
ASUN	1	0–1	.000	–	1	–	–	–	–
Atlantic 10	1	0–1	.000	–	1	–	–	–	–
MAAC	1	0–1	.000	1	–	–	–	–	–

== All-Tournament Team ==
Liam Entenmann, Notre Dame (Most Outstanding Player)
Brennan O'Neill, Duke
Jake Naso, Duke
Garrett Leadmon, Duke
Eric Dobson, Notre Dame
Chris Fake, Notre Dame
Chris Kavanagh, Notre Dame
Brian Tevlin, Notre Dame
TJ Malone, Penn State
Connor Shellenberger, Virginia

== Media coverage ==
ESPN held exclusive rights to the tournament.

=== Commentators ===
Play-by-play

- Drew Carter
- Chris Cotter
- Kevin Fitzgerald
- Anish Shroff

Analysts

- Paul Carcaterra
- Quint Kessenich
- Matt Ward
- Jules Heningburg
- Mark Dixon
