= 2019 NCAA Division I men's lacrosse tournament =

American college lacrosse tournament

- Finals site: Lincoln Financial Field, Philadelphia, Pennsylvania
- Champions: Virginia (6th title)
- Runner-up: Yale (2nd title game)
- Semifinalists: Penn State (1st Final Four); Duke (12th Final Four)
- MOP: Alex Rode, Virginia
- Attendance: 31,528 finals

The 2019 NCAA Division I Men's Lacrosse Championship was the 49th annual single-elimination tournament to determine the national championship for National Collegiate Athletic Association (NCAA) Division I men's college lacrosse. The semifinals and finals were played at Lincoln Financial Field in Philadelphia, Pennsylvania. This was the last tournament played until 2021 since the 2020 tournament was cancelled due to the COVID-19 pandemic.

== Teams ==
Seed	School	Conference	Berth Type	RPI	Record	Source
1	Penn State Nittany Lions	Big Ten	Automatic	1	16–2	
2	Duke Blue Devils	ACC	At-large	4	11–4	
3	Virginia Cavaliers	ACC	At-large	2	17–3	
4	Penn Quakers	Ivy League	Automatic	3	12–4	
5	Yale Bulldogs	Ivy League	At-large	5	15–4	
6	Towson Tigers	CAA	Automatic	6	11–5	
7	Notre Dame Fighting Irish	ACC	At-large	9	8–6	
8	Loyola Greyhounds	Patriot League	At-large	7	11–4	
	Johns Hopkins Blue Jays	Big Ten	At-large	8	8–7	
	Syracuse Orange	ACC	At-large	10	9–4	
	Maryland Terrapins	Big Ten	At-large	11	12–5	
	Army Black Knights	Patriot League	Automatic	15	13–4	
	Georgetown Hoyas	Big East	Automatic	16	13–4	
	Richmond Spiders	Southern	Automatic	25	10–6	
	Robert Morris Colonials	Northeast	Automatic	31	9–7	
	Marist Red Foxes	MAAC	Automatic	32	10–6	
	UMBC Retrievers	America East	Automatic	58	6–8	

== Bracket ==
Play–in game May 8, ESPN3; Poughkeepsie, NY
Marist	8
UMBC	14

First round May 11–12, ESPNU; Hosted by seeded team
1	Penn State	25
UMBC	10
8	Loyola	15
Syracuse	13
5	Yale	19
Georgetown	16
4	Penn	13
Army	8
3	Virginia	19
Robert Morris	10
6	Towson	13
Maryland	14*
7	Notre Dame	16
Johns Hopkins	9
2	Duke	12
Richmond	11

Quarterfinals; May 18–19, ESPNU; East Hartford, CT and Hempstead, NY
1	Penn State	21
8	Loyola	14
5	Yale	19*
4	Penn	18
3	Virginia	13*
Maryland	12
7	Notre Dame	13
2	Duke	14*

Semifinals; May 25, ESPN2; Philadelphia, PA
1	Penn State	17
5	Yale	21
3	Virginia	13**
2	Duke	12

National Championship; May 27, ESPN2; Philadelphia, PA
5	Yale	9
3	Virginia	13

== Game summaries ==
All times Eastern.

=== Play–in game ===
May 8, 2019; 7:00 p.m.	Marist	8–14; 4–3, 2–2, 0–4, 2–5	UMBC	Leonidoff Field – Poughkeepsie, NY; Attendance: 2,134

Game reference
Jake MacGregor	Goalies	Jack Morton; Tommy Lingner
Jake Weinman 3 Jamison Embury 2 Jojo Pirreca 2 Evan Gagne 1	Goalscorers	Trevor Patschorke 3 Steven Zichelli 3 Billy Nolan 2 Brett McIntyre 2 Ryan Frawley 2 Michael Zichelli 1 Josh Jordan 1
35	Shots	40

=== First round ===
May 11, 2019; 12:00 p.m.	No. 8 Loyola	15–13; 5–4, 2–5, 3–3, 5–1	Syracuse	Ridley Athletic Complex – Baltimore, MD; Attendance: 2,268

Game reference
Jacob Stover	Goalies	Drake Porter
Pat Spencer 3 John Duffy 2 PJ Brown 2 Chase Scanlan 2 Aidan Olmstead 2 Kevin Lindley 2 Dan Wigley 1 Ryan McNulty 1	Goalscorers	Jamie Trimboli 2 Brendan Curry 2 Nate Solomon 2 Stephen Rehfuss 2 David Lipka 1 Peter Dearth 1 Pat Carlin 1 Brett Kennedy 1 Jacob Buttermore 1
51	Shots	49

May 11, 2019; 2:30 p.m.	No. 5 Yale	19–16; 9–3, 3–3, 2–5, 5–5	Georgetown	Reese Stadium – New Haven, CT; Attendance: 1,689

Game reference
Jack Starr	Goalies	Chris Brandau
Matt Brandau 4 Matt Gaudet 4 Jackson Morrill 3 Joseph Sessa 2 John Danigellis 1 Jack Tigh 1 Lucas Cotler 1 Jack Ocken 1 Brian Tevlin 1 Christian Cropp 1	Goalscorers	Daniel Bucaro 8 Jack Carraway 4 Robert Clark 2 Austin McDonald 1 Dylan Watson 1
50	Shots	46

May 11, 2019; 5:00 p.m.	No. 4 Penn	13–8; 5–0, 2–5, 3–1, 3–2	Army	Franklin Field – Philadelphia, PA; Attendance: 2,218

Game reference
Reed Junkin	Goalies	AJ Barretto
Simon Mathias 4 Alex Roesner 3 Adam Goldner 3 Tyler Dunn 1 Mitch Bartolo 1 Sam Handley 1	Goalscorers	Nate Jones 3 Matt Manown 2 Sean O'Brien 2 Miles Silva 1
45	Shots	32

May 11, 2019; 7:00 p.m.	No. 3 Virginia	19–10; 4–2, 5–3, 5–2, 5–3	Robert Morris	Klöckner Stadium – Charlottesville, VA; Attendance: 1,124

Game reference
Alex Rode	Goalies	Alex Heger
Mikey Herring 6 Ryan Conrad 5 Michael Kraus 3 Dox Aitken 2 Matt Moore 2 Ian Laviano 1	Goalscorers	Corson Kealey 4 Tyson Gibson 2 Matt Schmidt 2 Ryan Smith 1 Austin Popovich 1
74	Shots	28

May 12, 2019; 12:00 p.m.	No. 1 Penn State	25–10; 7–4, 8–2, 8–1, 2–3	UMBC	Panzer Stadium – State College, PA; Attendance: 1,433

Game reference
Colby Kneese; Trevor Scollins	Goalies	Tommy Lingner; Jack Morton
Jack Kelly 6 Mac O'Keefe 6 Dylan Foulds 4 Grant Ament 3 TJ Malone 1 Nick Spillane 1 Dan Reaume 1 Cole Willard 1 Jake Glatz 1 Jack Traynor 1	Goalscorers	Ryan Frawley 6 Brett McIntyre 2 Michael Zichelli 1 Trevor Patschorke 1
43	Shots	28

May 12, 2019; 2:30 p.m.	No. 6 Towson	13–14 (OT); 3–3, 4–3, 3–3, 3–5; OT: 0–1	Maryland	Johnny Unitas Stadium – Towson, MD; Attendance: 2,314

Game reference
Tyler Canto	Goalies	Danny Dolan
Brody McLean 4 Brendan Sunday 4 Grant Maloof 2 Greg Ey 1 Timmy Monahan 1 Gray Bodden 1	Goalscorers	Bubba Fairman 3 Logan Wisnauskas 3 Anthony Demaio 2 Jared Bernhardt 2 Louis Dubick 2 Matt Rahill 1 Kyle Long 1
47	Shots	34

May 12, 2019; 5:00 p.m.	No. 2 Duke	12–11; 1–2, 6–3, 5–2, 0–4	Richmond	Koskinen Stadium – Durham, NC; Attendance: 772

Game reference
Turner Uppgren	Goalies	Jack Rusbuldt
Nakeie Montgomery 3 Brad Smith 2 Joe Robertson 2 CJ Carpenter 2 Joey Manown 2 Kevin Quigley 1	Goalscorers	Tate Gallagher 4 Mitch Savoca 2 Ryan Lanchbury 2 Ryan Lee 2 Tyler Shoults 1
35	Shots	32

May 12, 2019; 7:30 p.m.	No. 7 Notre Dame	16–9; 6–1, 4–1, 3–5, 3–2	Johns Hopkins	Arlotta Family Stadium – Notre Dame, IN; Attendance: 894

Game reference
Matt Schmidt	Goalies	Ryan Darby; Jacob Giacalone
Morrison Mirer 4 Bryan Costabile 3 Ryder Garnsey 3 Quinn McCahon 1 Brian Willets 1 Connor Morin 1 Brendan Gleason 1 Nick Stinn 1 Charles Leonard 1	Goalscorers	Forry Smith 3 Joey Epstein 3 Cole Williams 2 Kyle Marr 1
38	Shots	34

=== Quarterfinals ===
May 18, 2019; 12:00 p.m.	Maryland	12–13 (OT); 3–2, 3–3, 4–2, 2–5; OT: 0–1	No. 3 Virginia	James Shuart Stadium – Hempstead, NY; Attendance: 8,017

Game reference
Danny Dolan	Goalies	Alex Rode
Anthony DeMaio 4 Jared Bernhardt 4 Logan Wisnauskas 2 Louis Dubick 1 Christian Zawadzki 1	Goalscorers	Ryan Conrad 4 Ian Laviano 3 Matt Moore 2 Dox Aitken 1 Michael Kraus 1 Jared Conners 1 Mikey Herring 1
27	Shots	43

May 18, 2019; 2:30 p.m.	No. 2 Duke	14–13 (OT); 4–1, 3–4, 4–3, 2–5; OT: 1–0	No. 7 Notre Dame	James Shuart Stadium – Hempstead, NY; Attendance: 8,017

Game reference
Turner Uppgren	Goalies	Matt Schmidt
Joe Robertson 3 CJ Carpenter 3 Joey Manown 2 Sean Lowrie 2 Nakeie Montgomery 1 Brad Smith 1 Jake Seau 1 Kevin Quigley 1	Goalscorers	Ryder Garnsey 4 Brian Willets 3 Bryan Costabile 2 Brendan Gleason 2 Wheaton Jackoboice 1 John Hallenbeck 1
40	Shots	42

May 19, 2019; 12:00 p.m.	No. 8 Loyola	14–21; 6–5, 1–9, 7–3, 0–4	No. 1 Penn State	Rentschler Field – East Hartford, CT; Attendance: 8,568

Game reference
Jacob Stover	Goalies	Colby Kneese
Pat Spencer 6 John Duffy 2 Aidan Olmstead 2 Dan Wigley 2 Chase Scanlan 1 Kevin Lindley 1	Goalscorers	Mac O'Keefe 9 Jack Kelly 4 Dylan Foulds 2 Brian Townsend 2 Cole Willard 2 Nick Spillane 1 Grant Ament 1
41	Shots	54

May 19, 2019; 2:30 p.m.	No. 4 Penn	18–19 (OT); 5–7, 6–3, 3–4, 4–4; OT: 0–1	No. 5 Yale	Rentschler Field – East Hartford, CT; Attendance: 8,568

Game reference
Reed Junkin	Goalies	Jack Starr
Tyler Dunn 3 Mitch Bartolo 3 Adam Goldner 3 Sean Lulley 3 Simon Mathias 3 Joe Licciardi 1 Dylan Gergar 1 Kyle Gallagher 1	Goalscorers	Jackson Morrill 4 Lucas Cotler 4 John Danigellis 3 Matt Gaudet 3 Jack Tigh 2 Will Weitzel 1 Matt Brandau 1 Luke Eschbach 1
47	Shots	53

=== Semifinals ===
May 25, 2019; 12:00 p.m.	No. 3 Virginia	13–12 (2OT); 2–1, 0–4, 5–3, 5–4; OT: 1–0	No. 2 Duke	Lincoln Financial Field – Philadelphia, PA

Game reference
Alex Rode	Goalies	Turner Uppgren
Ian Laviano 4 Dox Aitken 3 Ryan Conrad 2 Matt Moore 2 Michael Kraus 1 Petey Lasalla 1	Goalscorers	Brad Smith 3 Kevin Quigley 2 Joe Robertson 2 CJ Carpenter 2 Brian Smyth 2 Joey Manown 1
53	Shots	48

May 25, 2019; 2:30 p.m.	No. 1 Penn State	17–21; 2–10, 7–2, 4–4, 4–5	No. 5 Yale	Lincoln Financial Field – Philadelphia, PA; Attendance: 32,612

Game reference
Colby Kneese	Goalies	Jack Starr
Dylan Foulds 4 Grant Ament 3 Mac O'Keefe 3 Gerard Arceri 3 Jack Kelly 2 Nick Spillane 1	Goalscorers	Matt Brandau 7 Jackson Morrill 3 Jack Tigh 2 Matt Gaudet 2 Joseph Sessa 1 John Danigellis 1 Lucas Cotler 1 Brian Tevlin 1 Christian Cropp 1 Brendan Rooney 1 Luke Eschbach 1
36	Shots	50

=== National Championship ===
May 27, 2019; 1:00 p.m.	No. 5 Yale	9–13; 1–2, 1–4, 3–5, 4–2	No. 3 Virginia	Lincoln Financial Field – Philadelphia, PA; Attendance: 31,528

Game reference
Jack Starr	Goalies	Alex Rode; Patrick Burkinshaw
Matt Brandau 3 Jack Tigh 2 Matt Gaudet 2 John Danigellis 1 Lucas Cotler 1	Goalscorers	Matt Moore 4 Michael Kraus 3 Dox Aitken 2 Petey LaSalla 2 Ryan Conrad 1 Ian Laviano 1
38	Shots	43
