= Richmond Spiders men's lacrosse =

- Founded: 2014
- University: University of Richmond
- Head coach: Dan Chemotti (since 2014 season)
- Stadium: Robins Stadium (capacity: 8,217)
- Location: Richmond, Virginia
- Conference: A-10
- Nickname: Spiders
- Colors: Blue and red

NCAA Tournament Quarterfinals
- 2025

NCAA Tournament appearances
- 2014, 2018, 2019, 2022, 2023, 2025, 2026

Conference Tournament championships
- 2014, 2018, 2019, 2022, 2023, 2025, 2026

Conference regular season championships
- 2015, 2017, 2018, 2021, 2025, 2026

The Richmond Spiders men's lacrosse team represents the University of Richmond in Richmond, Virginia. Through the 2022 season, it competed in the NCAA Division I Southern Conference. After that season, the Spiders' full-time home of the Atlantic 10 Conference (A-10) established a men's lacrosse league, with Richmond as one of the six inaugural members. The Spiders play their home games at Robins Stadium and are currently coached by Dan Chemotti.

== History ==
=== Starting a program ===
In September 2012, the University of Richmond announced a reconfiguration of its athletics program, discontinuing its men's soccer and men's track and field programs at the conclusion of the 2012–13 season and the elevation of men's lacrosse from club to varsity status at the NCAA Division I level starting in 2014. One month after revealing its plans to elevate men's lacrosse to varsity status, Richmond announced it had hired Dan Chemotti to lead the program. Chemotti, a former player and captain at Duke University, came to Richmond at the end of a five-year stint as an assistant at Loyola University, which won the Division I national championship in his final year on staff.

In February 2013, Richmond announced it would join the Atlantic Sun Conference, now known as the ASUN Conference, as an associate member for men's lacrosse when the program began play in 2014. The 2014 season would be the first year of men's lacrosse sponsorship for the Atlantic Sun, with full members Jacksonville and Mercer being joined by associate members Furman, High Point, Richmond, and VMI.

=== Up and running ===
Richmond began play in the 2014 season, hosting No. 7 Virginia in front of 4,249 fans at Robins Stadium. Richmond held a halftime lead over the Cavaliers but ultimately fell, 13–12. Despite a strong showing against a high-quality opponent in their first-ever game, it took until the sixth game of the season for the Spiders to record the program's first victory, a 12–11 win over Vermont.

Richmond went on to finish the regular season with a record of 4–10, but with an Atlantic Sun record of 2–3, the Spiders earned the fourth seed in the Atlantic Sun tournament held at the campus of No. 1 seed Mercer. Richmond upset Mercer in the semifinals, 14–6, before defeating No. 2 seed High Point, 8–7, to earn the Atlantic Sun's automatic bid to the 2014 NCAA Division I Men's Lacrosse Championship. Richmond became the first first-year program in NCAA Division I history to qualify for the tournament.

The Spiders traveled to Air Force for one of two play-in games, where Richmond fell, 13–5.

=== The SoCon takes over ===
Just prior to the 2014 season, the Atlantic Sun Conference and the Southern Conference announced a partnership that would see the Southern Conference (SoCon) take over sponsorship of men's lacrosse as both Mercer and VMI joined the SoCon beginning in the 2014–15 academic year. With the addition of Bellarmine University, the 2015 SoCon season included seven programs.

The 2015 season saw the Spiders finish the regular season with a 10–4 record, with three of the four losses coming to nationally ranked teams. Richmond finished a perfect 6–0 in SoCon play, earning a conference championship and the top seed in the Southern Conference tournament, which was held at Robins Stadium. Richmond defeated Furman in the semifinals but fell to High Point in double overtime in the championship game, ending the Spiders' season.

2016 saw the Southern Conference add Air Force as its eighth men's lacrosse program. The Spiders once again finished the regular season with a 10–4 record, placing second in the SoCon with a 6–1 record. Richmond's lone conference defeat was a 9–8 loss to Air Force, which claimed the regular season conference championship with a perfect 7–0 record. In the Southern Conference tournament once again held at Robins Stadium, the Spiders defeated No. 3 seed High Point before falling once again to Air Force, 9–8 in overtime.

Richmond's fourth year as a program in 2017 saw the team finish the regular season with a record of 11–3 including a victory over defending national champions North Carolina and each of its three losses (Duke, Virginia, and Air Force) coming by a single goal. The Spiders finished 6–1 in SoCon play, earning a share of the regular season championship as part of a three-way tie with Air Force and Furman. Per the Southern Conference tie breaking criteria, Air Force received the number one seed in the conference tournament, while Richmond received the second seed and Furman the third seed. At the tournament, once again held at Robins Stadium, the Spiders defeated Furman in the semifinals before falling once more to Air Force, 9–6, to finish the season with a 12–4 record. Just prior to the start of the conference tournament, Richmond announced it had signed head coach Dan Chemotti to a new five-year contract.

=== A-10 homecoming ===
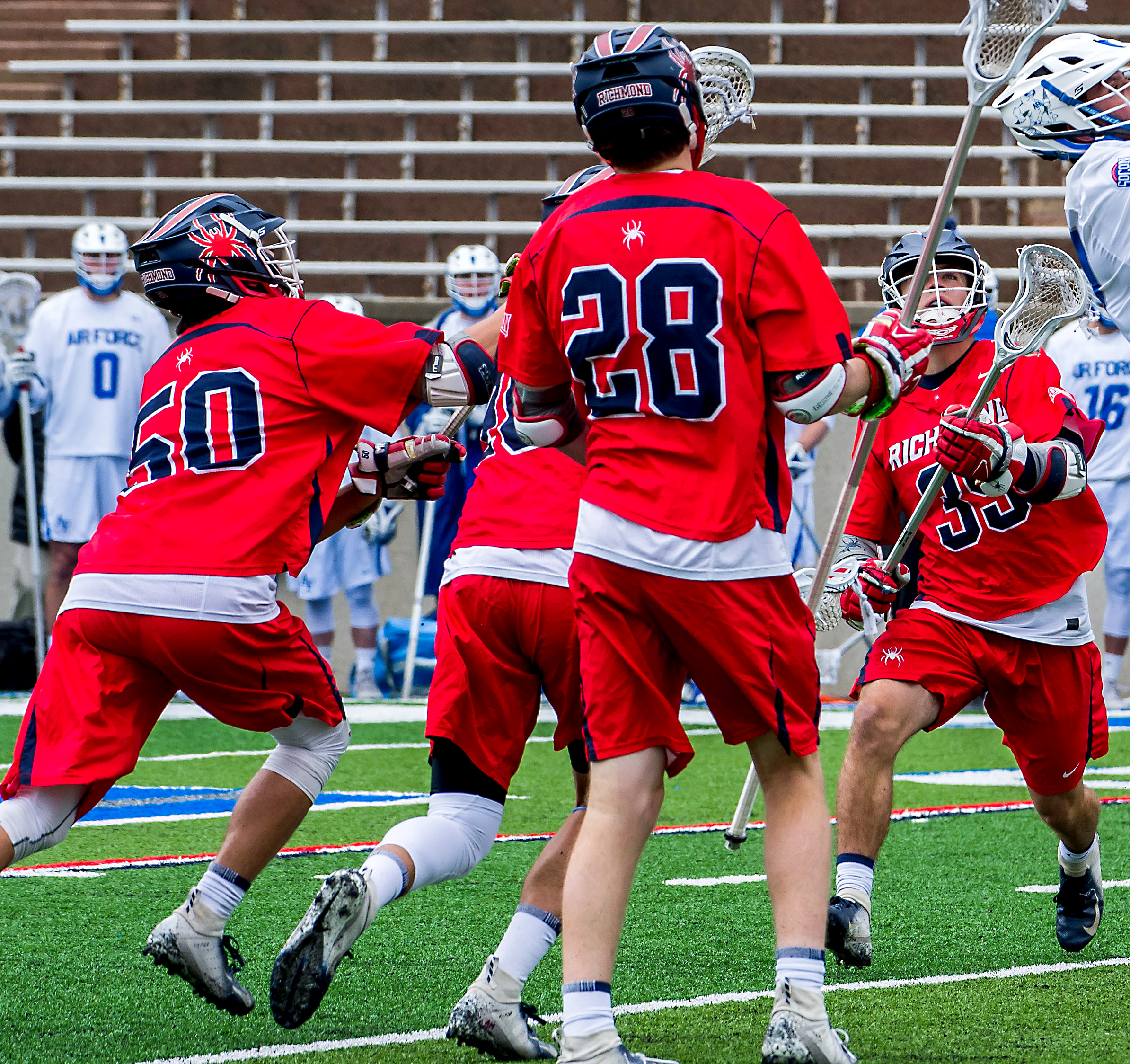
The Spiders men's lacrosse team during a match in 2019

Since at least the mid-2010s, Richmond's full-time home of the A-10 had been working toward establishing a men's lacrosse league. In the 2022 season, the conference had four full members that sponsored men's lacrosse (Richmond, St. Bonaventure, Saint Joseph's, and UMass), two short of the number required for an automatic bid to the NCAA tournament. In February 2022, USA Lacrosse Magazine reported that the A-10 was evaluating Fairfield, High Point, and Hobart for associate membership in order to reach the required membership total. On May 23, 2022, the A-10 announced that it would establish a men's lacrosse league in the 2023 season, with the four full members joined by High Point and Hobart.

== Season results ==
The following is a list of Richmond's results by season as an NCAA Division I program:

| Season | Coach | Overall | Conference | Standing | Postseason |
|---|---|---|---|---|---|
Dan Chemotti (Atlantic Sun Conference) (2014–2015)
| 2014 | Dan Chemotti | 6–11 | 2–3 | 4th | NCAA Division I Play-In Round |
Dan Chemotti (Southern Conference) (2015–2022)
| 2015 | Dan Chemotti | 11–5 | 6–0 | 1st | |
| 2016 | Dan Chemotti | 11–5 | 6–1 | 2nd | |
| 2017 | Dan Chemotti | 12–4 | 6–1 | T–1st | |
| 2018 | Dan Chemotti | 11–6 | 6–1 | T–1st | NCAA Division I First Round |
| 2019 | Dan Chemotti | 10–7 | 5–2 | T–3rd | NCAA Division I First Round |
| 2020 | Dan Chemotti | 4–3 | 1–0 | † | † |
| 2021 | Dan Chemotti | 7–6 | 5–1 | T–1st | |
| 2022 | Dan Chemotti | 11–5 | 4–1 | 2nd | NCAA Division I First Round |
Dan Chemotti (Atlantic 10 Conference) (2023–future)
| 2023 | Dan Chemotti | 11–5 | 4–1 | 2nd | NCAA Division I First Round |
| 2024 | Dan Chemotti | 10–6 | 4–1 | 2nd | |
| 2025 | Dan Chemotti | 14–4 | 5–0 | 1st | NCAA Division I Quarterfinals |
| 2026 | Dan Chemotti | 14–2 | 6–0 | 1st | NCAA Division I First Round |
| Dan Chemotti: | | 132–69 (.657) | 62–12 (.838) | | |
| Total: | | 132–69 (.657) | | | |
National champion Postseason invitational champion Conference regular season champion Conference regular season and conference tournament champion Division regular season champion Division regular season and conference tournament champion Conference tournament champion

†NCAA canceled 2020 collegiate activities due to COVID-19.
