= 2018 NCAA Division I men's lacrosse tournament =

American college lacrosse tournament

- Teams: 17
- Finals site: Gillette Stadium, Foxborough, MA
- Champions: Yale (1st title)
- Runner-up: Duke
- Semifinalists: Albany; Maryland
- MOP: Ben Reeves (11g 14a)
- Attendance: 30,616 semi-finals 29,455 finals 60,071 total
- Top scorer: Ben Reeves, Yale (11 goals)

The 2018 NCAA Division I Men's Lacrosse Championship weekend was the 48th annual single-elimination tournament to determine the national championship for National Collegiate Athletic Association (NCAA) Division I men's college lacrosse.

Seventeen teams competed in the tournament, based upon their performance during the regular season. For nine teams, entry into the tournament was by means of a conference tournament automatic qualifier and/or play in, while for eight teams at-large selection was determined by the NCAA selection committee.

Yale controlled the tournament finals from start to finish, though Duke kept the game suspenseful to the end. This was Yale’s first NCAA lacrosse title and second title overall. Yale's Ben Reeves tied Eamon McEneaney’s 1977 record for most points in an NCAA tournament with 25 points. McEneaney set the record in three tournament games. This was the sixth national championship game for Duke since 2005.

== Teams ==
Seed	School	Conference	Berth Type	RPI	Record
1	Maryland	Big Ten	At-large	1	12–3
2	Albany	America East	Automatic	2	14–2
3	Yale	Ivy	At-large	6	13–3
4	Duke	ACC	At-large	5	13–3
5	Johns Hopkins	Big Ten	Automatic	3	11–4
6	Loyola	Patriot	Automatic	7	12–3
7	Notre Dame	ACC	At-large	4	9–5
8	Syracuse	ACC	At-large	10	8–6
	Denver	Big East	At-large	8	12–3
	Cornell	Ivy	Automatic	9	12–4
	Virginia	ACC	At-large	11	12–5
	Villanova	Big East	At-large	12	10–5
	Georgetown	Big East	Automatic	13	12–4
	Robert Morris	Northeast	Automatic	19	12–4
	Massachusetts	CAA	Automatic	21	12–4
	Richmond	Southern	Automatic	29	11–5
	Canisius	MAAC	Automatic	49	8–8

== Bracket ==
Opening Round; May 9th
Canisius	6
Robert Morris	12

First Round
May 12–13

Campus sites: seeded teams host

Quarterfinals
May 20

Navy-Marine Corps Memorial Stadium
Annapolis, MD
May 19
James M. Shuart Stadium
Hempstead, NY

Semifinals
May 26

Gillette Stadium

Championship
May 28

Gillette Stadium

1
Maryland
14

Robert Morris
11

1
Maryland
13

Cornell
8

8
Syracuse
9

Cornell
10

1
Maryland
8

4
Duke
13

5
Johns Hopkins
10

Georgetown
9

5
Johns Hopkins
9

4
Duke
14

4
Duke
17

Villanova
11

4
Duke
11

3
Yale
13

3
Yale
15

UMass
13

3
Yale
8

6
Loyola
5

6
Loyola
14

Virginia
12

3
Yale
20

2
Albany
11

7
Notre Dame
7

Denver
9

Denver
13

2
Albany
15

2
Albany
18

Richmond
9

== Media coverage ==
=== Radio ===
Westwood One provided nationwide radio coverage of the semifinals and championship. It was once again streamed online at westwoodsports.com, through TuneIn, and on SiriusXM. Dave Ryan, Mark Dixon and Jason Horowitz provided the call for Westwood One.

=== Television ===
Every game of the 2018 Men's Lacrosse Championship was broadcast on the ESPN Networks (ESPN3- Opening Round, ESPNU- First Round and Quarterfinals, ESPN2- Semifinals and National Championship).

==== Broadcast Assignments ====
Opening Round

- Andy Helwig & Sean Sharman - Buffalo, NY

First Round

- Jay Alter & Ryan Boyle- New Haven, CT
- Booker Corrigan & Mark Dixon- College Park, MD
- Mike Corey & Don Zimmerman- Durham, NC
- John Brickley & Matt Ward- South Bend, IN
- Chris Cotter, Paul Carcaterra, & Ric Beardsley (Syracuse only)- Albany and Syracuse, NY
- Anish Shroff & Quint Kessenich- Baltimore, MD

Quarterfinals, Semifinals, & National Championship

- Anish Shroff, Quint Kessenich, & Paul Carcaterra
