= Georgetown Hoyas men's lacrosse =

- Founded: 1951; 1963
- University: Georgetown University
- Head coach: Kevin Warne (since 2013 season)
- Stadium: Cooper Field (capacity: 3,750)
- Location: Washington, D.C.
- Conference: Big East
- Nickname: Hoyas
- Colors: Blue and gray

NCAA Tournament Final Fours
- 1999

NCAA Tournament Quarterfinals
- 1998, 1999, 2000, 2002, 2003, 2004, 2005, 2006, 2007, 2021, 2023, 2024, 2025, 2026

NCAA Tournament appearances
- 1997, 1998, 1999, 2000, 2001, 2002, 2003, 2004, 2005, 2006, 2007, 2018, 2019, 2021, 2022, 2023, 2024, 2025, 2026

Conference Tournament championships
- 2018, 2019, 2021, 2022, 2023, 2024, 2025, 2026

Conference regular season championships
- 2000, 2001, 2003, 2004, 2006, 2007, 2021, 2022, 2023, 2025, 2026

The Georgetown Hoyas men's lacrosse team represents Georgetown University in National Collegiate Athletic Association (NCAA) Division I college lacrosse. The Hoyas are currently led by head coach Kevin Warne. The team plays its home games at Cooper Field. Georgetown previously competed in the old Big East Conference. The new Big East sponsors lacrosse. From 2000–2010, they were a member of the ECAC Lacrosse League and before that, they competed as independents.

The Hoyas appeared in their first NCAA tournament in 1997, losing 14–10 to Maryland. Georgetown scored its first tournament victory in 1998, defeating UMBC, 9–8. The only time they ever advanced past the quarterfinals of the tournament came in 1999 as they defeated Notre Dame and Duke before losing to Syracuse in the semifinals. From 1997–2007, they made the tournament every season and from 2002–2007, they made the quarterfinals every season. They failed to return to the tournament until the Hoyas won the Big East Tournament in 2018.

== Season results ==
The following is a list of Georgetown's results by season as an NCAA Division I program:

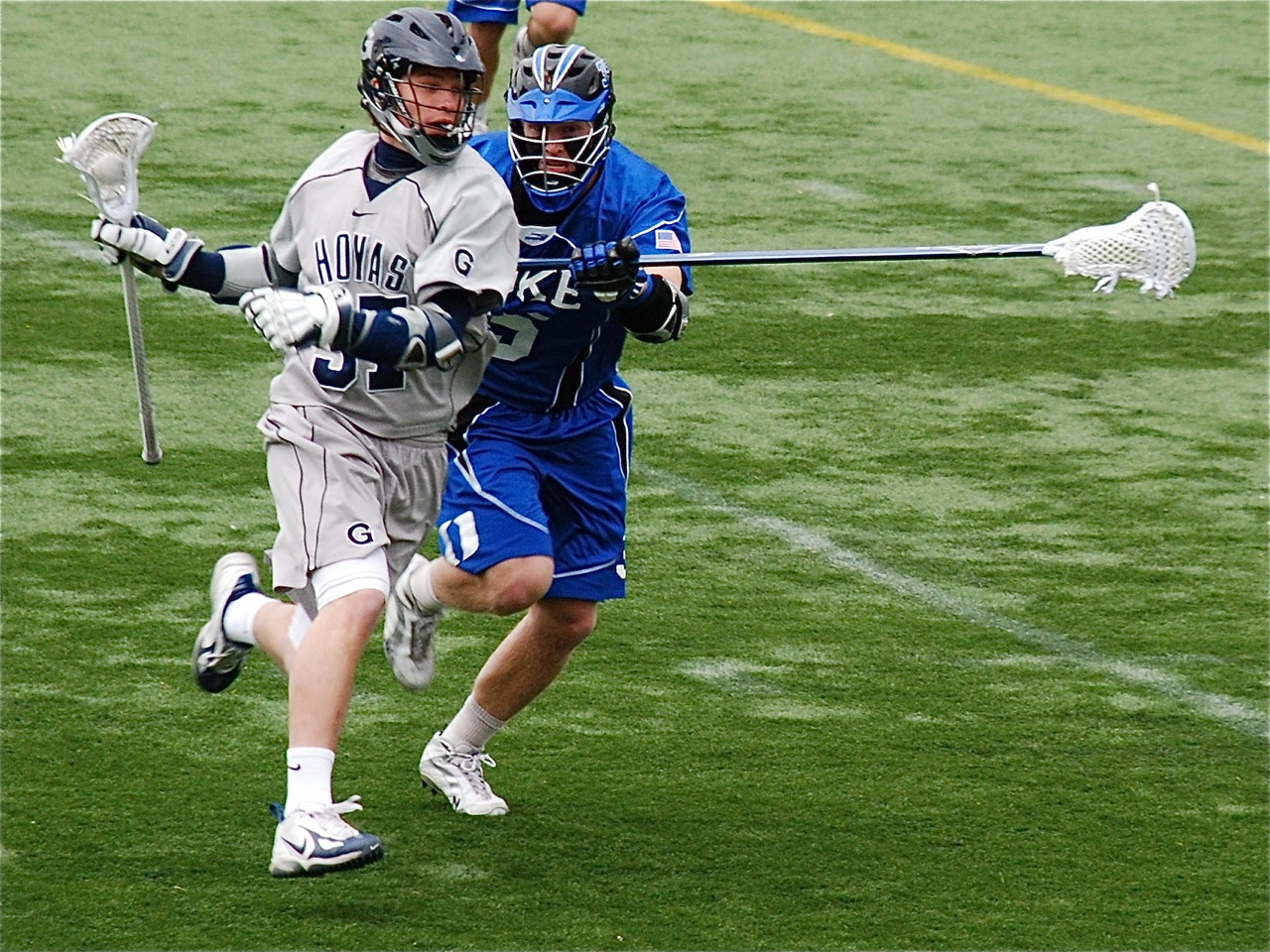
In 2008, Georgetown defeated #1 ranked Duke, their first win over a top-ranked opponent.

Season	Coach	Overall	Conference	Standing	Postseason
Jim Feely (Independent) (1971–1973)
1971	Jim Feely	1–7			
1972	Jim Feely	1–6			
1973	Jim Feely	2–5			
Jim Feely:		4–18 (.182)			
Greg Besosa (Independent) (1974–1975)
1974	Greg Besosa	2–8			
1975	Greg Besosa	0–8			
Greg Besosa:		2–16 (.111)			
Greg Swanson (Independent) (1976–1980)
1976	Greg Swanson	2–6			
1977	Greg Swanson	0–7			
1978	Greg Swanson	0–9			
1979	Greg Swanson	2–7			
1980	Greg Swanson	4–6			
Greg Swanson:		8–35 (.186)			
Tom Oberdorfer (Independent) (1981–1982)
1981	Tom Oberdorfer	4–7			
1982	Tom Oberdorfer	3–12			
Tom Oberdorfer:		7–19 (.269)			
Bill Gorrow (Independent) (1983–1989)
1983	Bill Gorrow	2–7			
1984	Bill Gorrow	4–9			
1985	Bill Gorrow	2–11			
1986	Bill Gorrow	1–13			
1987	Bill Gorrow	4–7			
1988	Bill Gorrow	4–7			
1989	Bill Gorrow	5–8			
Bill Gorrow:		22–62 (.262)			
Dave Urick (Independent) (1990–1999)
1990	Dave Urick	8–5			
1991	Dave Urick	7–5			
1992	Dave Urick	9–3			
1993	Dave Urick	9–4			
1994	Dave Urick	10–3			
1995	Dave Urick	10–4			
1996	Dave Urick	8–5			
1997	Dave Urick	9–5			NCAA Division I First Round
1998	Dave Urick	10–5			NCAA Division I Quarterfinals
1999	Dave Urick	13–3			NCAA Division I Final Four
Dave Urick (ECAC Lacrosse League) (2000–2009)
2000	Dave Urick	12–3	6–0	1st	NCAA Division I Quarterfinals
2001	Dave Urick	11–3	5–1	T–1st	NCAA Division I First Round
2002	Dave Urick	12–3	4–1	2nd	NCAA Division I Quarterfinals
2003	Dave Urick	11–4	4–1	1st	NCAA Division I Quarterfinals
2004	Dave Urick	11–4	3–0	1st	NCAA Division I Quarterfinals
2005	Dave Urick	10–5	4–2		NCAA Division I Quarterfinals
2006	Dave Urick	12–3	6–1	1st	NCAA Division I Quarterfinals
2007	Dave Urick	12–3	7–0	1st	NCAA Division I Quarterfinals
2008	Dave Urick	9–4	5–2		
2009	Dave Urick	7–7	3–4	5th	
Dave Urick (Big East Conference) (2010–2012)
2010	Dave Urick	9–5	5–1	2nd	
2011	Dave Urick	7–7	4–2	3rd	
2012	Dave Urick	7–6	3–3	T–3rd	
Dave Urick:		223–99 (.693)	59–18 (.766)		
Kevin Warne (Big East Conference) (2013–Present)
2013	Kevin Warne	6–9	3–3	T–4th	
2014	Kevin Warne	4–10	1–5	T–6th	
2015	Kevin Warne	10–6	4–1	2nd	
2016	Kevin Warne	2–12	1–4	T–5th	
2017	Kevin Warne	4–10	1–4	5th	
2018	Kevin Warne	12–5	3–2	T–2nd	NCAA Division I First Round
2019	Kevin Warne	13–5	3–2	T–2nd	NCAA Division I First Round
2020	Kevin Warne	6–0	0–0	†	†
2021	Kevin Warne	13–3	9–1	T–1st	NCAA Division I Quarterfinals
2022	Kevin Warne	15–2	5–0	1st	NCAA Division I First Round
2023	Kevin Warne	13–4	5–0	1st	NCAA Division I Quarterfinals
2024	Kevin Warne	13–4	4–1	2nd	NCAA Division I Quarterfinals
2025	Kevin Warne	12–5	4–1	T–1st	NCAA Division I Quarterfinals
2026	Kevin Warne	11–5	5–0	1st	NCAA Division I Quarterfinals
Kevin Warne:		134–80 (.626)	48–24 (.667)		
Total:		423–368 (.535)			
National champion Postseason invitational champion Conference regular season champion Conference regular season and conference tournament champion Division regular season champion Division regular season and conference tournament champion Conference tournament champion

†NCAA canceled 2020 collegiate activities due to the COVID-19 virus.

== See also ==
- Georgetown Hoyas women's lacrosse
