= 2021 NCAA Division I men's lacrosse tournament =

American college lacrosse tournament

- Teams: 16
- Finals site: Rentschler Field, East Hartford, Connecticut
- Champions: Virginia (7th title)
- Runner-up: Maryland (15th title game)
- Semifinalists: North Carolina (14th Final Four); Duke (13th Final Four)
- MOP: Connor Shellenberger
- Attendance: 14,816 finals

The 2021 NCAA Division I Men's Lacrosse Championship was the 50th annual single-elimination tournament to determine the national championship for National Collegiate Athletic Association (NCAA) Division I men's college lacrosse. Because the Ivy League did not participate in lacrosse this season, no play-in game was required. This was the first tournament played since 2019 due to the 2020 tournament being cancelled during the COVID-19 pandemic.

Sixteen teams competed in the tournament based upon their performance during the regular season. For eight teams, entry into the tournament was by means of a conference tournament automatic qualifier and/or play in, while for the remaining eight teams at-large selection was determined by the NCAA selection committee.

== Tournament overview ==
Virginia took control over an undefeated Maryland team in the Championship Game, at one point leading 16–11. Maryland closed the gap in the fourth quarter scoring a goal with 10.8 seconds left to cut Virginia's lead to 17-16. Terps had an open shot on goal to tie the game with two seconds left off a Luke Weirman face off win, but a save by Alex Rode won the title for UVA. This was Virginia's seventh NCAA lacrosse title and second in the prior two NCAA tournaments (the 2020 NCAA tournament had been cancelled due to covid).

== Teams ==
| Seed | School | Conference | Berth Type | RPI | Record |
|---|---|---|---|---|---|
| 1 | North Carolina Tar Heels | ACC | At-large | 1 | 11–2 |
| 2 | Duke Blue Devils | ACC | At-large | 3 | 12–2 |
| 3 | Maryland Terrapins | Big Ten | Automatic | 2 | 12–0 |
| 4 | Virginia Cavaliers | ACC | At-large | 5 | 10–4 |
| 5 | Georgetown Hoyas | Big East | Automatic | 6 | 12–2 |
| 6 | Notre Dame Fighting Irish | ACC | At-large | 4 | 7–3 |
| 7 | Denver Pioneers | Big East | At-large | 7 | 12–4 |
| 8 | Lehigh Mountain Hawks | Patriot League | Automatic | 8 | 10–1 |
| | Rutgers Scarlet Knights | Big Ten | At-large | 9 | 8–3 |
| | Syracuse Orange | ACC | At-large | 10 | 7–5 |
| | Drexel Dragons | CAA | Automatic | 12 | 10–2 |
| | Loyola Greyhounds | Patriot League | At-large | 12 | 9–5 |
| | Vermont Catamounts | America East | Automatic | 15 | 8–4 |
| | High Point Panthers | Southern | Automatic | 16 | 8–5 |
| | Bryant Bulldogs | Northeast | Automatic | 19 | 9–3 |
| | Monmouth Hawks | MAAC | Automatic | | 8–2 |

== Bracket ==
First round May 15–16, ESPNU; Peter Barton Lacrosse Stadium, Klöckner Stadium, Dorrance Field, Maryland Stadium
1 | North Carolina | 16
Monmouth | 4
8 | Lehigh | 5
Rutgers | 12
5 | Georgetown | 18
Syracuse | 8
4 | Virginia | 13
Bryant | 11
3 | Maryland | 17
Vermont | 11
6 | Notre Dame | 10
Drexel | 8
7 | Denver | 13
Loyola | 14
2 | Duke | 16
High Point | 10

Quarterfinals; May 22–23, ESPNU; James Shuart Stadium, Arlotta Stadium
1 | North Carolina | 12*
Rutgers | 11
5 | Georgetown | 3
4 | Virginia | 14
3 | Maryland | 14*
6 | Notre Dame | 13
Loyola | 9
2 | Duke | 10*

Semifinals; May 29, ESPN2; Rentschler Field
1 | North Carolina | 11
4 | Virginia | 12
3 | Maryland | 14
2 | Duke | 5

National Championship; May 31, ESPN2; Rentschler Field
4 | Virginia | 17
3 | Maryland | 16

* Overtime

== Tournament boxscores ==
Tournament Finals (5/31/2021 at East Hartford, Conn. Pratt & Whitney Stadium)

| Team | 1 | 2 | 3 | 4 | Total |
|---|---|---|---|---|---|
| Virginia | 4 | 5 | 5 | 3 | 17 |
| Maryland (15–1) | 4 | 3 | 4 | 5 | 16 |
Virginia scoring – Connor Shellenberger 4, Matt Moore 4, Jeff Conner 3, Payton Cormier 2, Dox Aitken, Petey LaSalla, Jared Conners, Peter Garno; Maryland scoring – Logan Wisnauskas 5, Jared Bernhardt 2, Anthony DeMaio 2, Daniel Maltz 2, Kyle Long, Bubba Fairman, Griffin Brown, Roman Puglise, Joshua Coffman; Shots: Maryland 49, Virginia 39; Saves: Virginia Alex Rode 12, Maryland Logan McNaney 11; Attendance: 14,816

Tournament Semi-Finals

| Team | 1 | 2 | 3 | 4 | Total |
|---|---|---|---|---|---|
| Virginia | 2 | 7 | 3 | 0 | 12 |
| North Carolina | 3 | 1 | 4 | 3 | 11 |
Virginia scoring – Payton Cormier 3, Connor Shellenberger 2, Charlie Bertrand 2, Matt Moore, Ian Laviano, Peter Garno, Jared Conners, Jeff Conner; North Carolina scoring – William Perry 5, Chris Gray 3, Connor McCarthy, Lance Tillman, Alex Trippi; Shots: North Carolina 49, Virginia 39

| Team | 1 | 2 | 3 | 4 | Total |
|---|---|---|---|---|---|
| Maryland | 2 | 6 | 3 | 3 | 14 |
| Duke | 1 | 2 | 1 | 1 | 5 |
Maryland scoring – Jared Bernhardt 5, Logan Wisnauskas 2, Anthony DeMaio 2, Bubba Fairman, Justin Shockey, Eric Holden, Roman Puglise, Griffin Brown; Duke scoring – Michael Sowers 2, Dyson Williams 2, Brennan O'Neill; Shots: Maryland 32, Duke 32; Attendance: 13,707

Tournament Quarterfinals

| Team | 1 | 2 | 3 | 4 | Total |
|---|---|---|---|---|---|
| Virginia | 4 | 6 | 4 | 0 | 14 |
| Georgetown | 1 | 0 | 1 | 1 | 3 |
Virginia scoring – Connor Shellenberger 6, Ian Laviano 2, Matt Moore, Payton Cormier, Dox Aitken, Petey LaSalla, Charlie Bertrand, Xander Dickson; Georgetown scoring – Dylan Watson, Declan Mcdermott, Gibson Smith; Shots: Virginia 45, Georgetown 27

| Team | 1 | 2 | 3 | 4 | OT | Total |
|---|---|---|---|---|---|---|
| Maryland | 5 | 2 | 2 | 4 | 1 | 14 |
| Notre Dame | 1 | 6 | 4 | 2 | 0 | 13 |
Maryland scoring – Jared Bernhardt 5, Logan Wisnauskas 3, Griffin Brown 2, Bubba Fairman, Anthony DeMaio, Kyle Long, Daniel Maltz; Notre Dame scoring – Wheaton Jackoboice 4, Eric Dobson 2, Sean Leahey 2, Will Yorke 2, Griffin Westlin, Pat Kavanagh, David Lipka; Shots: Maryland 42, Notre Dame 40

| Team | 1 | 2 | 3 | 4 | OT | Total |
|---|---|---|---|---|---|---|
| North Carolina | 1 | 2 | 4 | 4 | 1 | 12 |
| Rutgers | 1 | 2 | 4 | 4 | 0 | 11 |
North Carolina scoring – Lance Tillman 4, Justin Anderson 3, Connor McCarthy 2, Alex Trippi, Zac Tucci, Nicky Solomon; Rutgers scoring – Adam Charalambides 4, David Sprock 2, Connor Kirst 2, Ross Scott 2, Shane Knobloch; Shots: North Carolina 41, Rutgers 38

| Team | 1 | 2 | 3 | 4 | OT | Total |
|---|---|---|---|---|---|---|
| Duke | 2 | 3 | 1 | 3 | 1 | 10 |
| Loyola | 3 | 0 | 2 | 4 | 0 | 9 |
Duke scoring – Brennan O'Neill 4, Joe Robertson 3, Michael Sowers, Brian Smyth, Aidan Danenza; Loyola scoring – Evan James 4, Kevin Lindley 2, Seth Higgins, Dan Wigley, Adam Poitras; Shots: North Carolina 41, Rutgers 38

Tournament First Round

| Team | 1 | 2 | 3 | 4 | Total |
|---|---|---|---|---|---|
| Virginia | 2 | 7 | 3 | 0 | 14 |
| Bryant | 3 | 1 | 4 | 3 | 3 |
Virginia scoring – Payton Cormier 3, Connor Shellenberger 2, Charlie Bertrand 2, Matt Moore, Ian Laviano, Peter Garno, Jared Conners, Jeff Conner; North Carolina scoring – William Perry 5, Chris Gray 3, Connor McCarthy, Lance Tillman, Alex Trippi; Shots: North Carolina 49, Virginia 39

| Team | 1 | 2 | 3 | 4 | Total |
|---|---|---|---|---|---|
| Maryland | 3 | 4 | 4 | 5 | 17 |
| Vermont | 4 | 2 | 1 | 4 | 9 |
Maryland scoring – Jared Bernhardt 6, Kyle Long 3, Logan Wisnauskas 2, Griffin Brown 2, Bubba Fairman, Joshua Coffman, Daniel Maltz, Luke Wierman; Vermont scoring – Thomas McConvey 4, JJ Levandowski 3, Tommy Burke, Jonas Hunter, Liam Limoges, Michael McCormack; Shots: Maryland 40, Vermont 30

| Team | 1 | 2 | 3 | 4 | Total |
|---|---|---|---|---|---|
| North Carolina | 3 | 4 | 4 | 5 | 16 |
| Monmouth | 0 | 1 | 1 | 2 | 4 |
North Carolina scoring – Chris Gray 4, Jacob Kelly 2, Nicky Solomon 2, Ryan O'Connell 2, William Perry, Alex Trippi, Brian Cameron, Justin Anderson, Lance Tillman, Cole Herbert; Monmouth scoring – Connor Macrae, Dwayne Mattushik, Matt Karsian, Mike McIntyre; Shots: North Carolina 43, Monmouth 35

| Team | 1 | 2 | 3 | 4 | Total |
|---|---|---|---|---|---|
| Duke | 4 | 6 | 3 | 3 | 16 |
| High Point | 1 | 4 | 2 | 3 | 10 |
Duke scoring – Michael Sowers 4, Sean Lowrie 3, Owen Caputo 2, Brennan O'Neill 2, Garrett Leadmon, Nakeie Montgomery, JPBasile, Dyson Williams, Jake Naso; High Point scoring – Jack Vanoverbeke 2, Brayden Mayea 2, Kevin Rogers 2, Koby Russell, Asher Nolting, Tyler Stinson, Colin Clothier; Shots: Duke 43, High Point 34

| Team | 1 | 2 | 3 | 4 | Total |
|---|---|---|---|---|---|
| Rutgers | 3 | 4 | 2 | 4 | 12 |
| Lehigh | 1 | 2 | 2 | 1 | 5 |
Rutgers scoring – Connor Kirst 3, Kieran Mullins 3, Adam Charalambides 3, David Sprock, Cole Daninger, Brennan Kamish; Lehigh scoring – Justin Tiernan 2, Scott Cole, Ryan Niggeman, Cole Kirst; Shots: Rutgers 42, Lehigh 35

| Team | 1 | 2 | 3 | 4 | Total |
|---|---|---|---|---|---|
| Georgetown | 3 | 5 | 5 | 5 | 18 |
| Syracuse | 2 | 2 | 0 | 4 | 8 |
Georgetown scoring – Declan McDermott 5, Jake Carraway 5, Dylan Hess 4, Graham Bundy Jr. 2, Nicky Petkevich 2; Syracuse scoring – Jamie Trimboli 3, Owen Seebold 2, Brett Kennedy, Stephen Rehfuss, Owen Hiltz; Shots: Georgetown 43, Syracuse 33

| Team | 1 | 2 | 3 | 4 | Total |
|---|---|---|---|---|---|
| Notre Dame | 4 | 3 | 1 | 2 | 10 |
| Drexel (10–3) | 2 | 1 | 4 | 1 | 8 |
Notre Dame scoring – Wheaton Jackoboice 3, Morrison Mirer 2, Pat Kavanagh 2, Sean Leahey, David Lipka, Will Yorke; Drexel scoring – Reid Bowering 4, Jack Mulcahy, Sean Donnelly, Ryan Genord, Aidan Coll; Shots: Notre Dame 47, Drexel 42; Saves: Notre Dame Liam Entenmann 17, Drexel Ross Blumenthal 15 - Casey DuBois 0; Location: Denver, Colo. (Peter Barton Stadium) - 5/15/2021; Attendance: 838

| Team | 1 | 2 | 3 | 4 | Total |
|---|---|---|---|---|---|
| Loyola | 2 | 7 | 2 | 3 | 14 |
| Denver (12–5) | 2 | 2 | 6 | 3 | 13 |
Loyola scoring – Aidan Olmstead 5, Kevin Lindley 2, Seth Higgins 2, Evan James 2, Liam Bateman, Peter Swindell, Adam Poitras; Denver scoring – Jack Hannah 3, Jackson Morrill 3, Lucas Cotler 2, Ethan Walker 2, Kyle Smith, Ted Sullivan, Malik Sparrow, Shots: Denver 48, Loyola 36; Saves: Loyola Sam Shafer 16, Denver Jack Thompson 7; Location: Denver, Colo. (Peter Barton Stadium) - 5/16/2021; Attendance: 970

| Team | 1 | 2 | 3 | 4 | Total |
|---|---|---|---|---|---|
| Duke | 2 | 7 | 2 | 3 | 16 |
| High Point (12–5) | 2 | 2 | 6 | 3 | 10 |
Duke scoring – Aidan Olmstead 5, Kevin Lindley 2, Seth Higgins 2, Evan James 2, Liam Bateman, Peter Swindell, Adam Poitras; High Point scoring – Jack Hannah 3, Jackson Morrill 3, Lucas Cotler 2, Ethan Walker 2, Kyle Smith, Ted Sullivan, Malik Sparrow, Shots: Duke 48, High Point 36; Saves: Duke Sam Shafer 16, High Point Jack Thompson 7; Location: Denver, Colo. (Peter Barton Stadium) - 5/16/2021; Attendance: 970

== Record by conference ==
| Conference | # of Bids | Record | Win % | PG | R16 | QF | SF | CG | NC |
|---|---|---|---|---|---|---|---|---|---|
| America East | 1 | 0–1 | .500 | | 1 | | | | |
| ACC | 5 | 1–1 | .500 | | 5 | 4 | 3 | 1 | 1 |
| Big East | 2 | 1–2 | .333 | | 2 | 1 | | | |
| Big Ten | 2 | 6–2 | .750 | | 2 | 2 | 1 | 1 | |
| CAA | 1 | 0–1 | .000 | | 1 | | | | |
| MAAC | 1 | 0–1 | .000 | | 1 | | | | |
| NEC | 1 | 0–1 | .000 | | 1 | | | | |
| Patriot | 2 | 0–1 | .000 | | 2 | 1 | | | |
| SoCon | 1 | 0–1 | .000 | | 1 | | | | |

== All-Tournament Team ==
Connor Shellenberger, Virginia (Most Outstanding Player)
Cade Saustad, Virginia
Alex Rode, Virginia
Petey LaSalla, Virginia
Jared Connors, Virginia
Matt Moore, Virginia
Nick Grill, Maryland
Logan Wisnauskas, Maryland
Jared Bernhardt, Maryland
William Perry, North Carolina

== Citations ==
- For brackets, scores, seedings, All Tournament teams, refer to NCAA.com – https://www.ncaa.com/history/lacrosse-men/d1
- For box scores, refer to individual university, college athletic web sites
