= 2007 NCAA Division I men's lacrosse tournament =

- Dates: May 12–28, 2007
- Teams: 16
- Finals site: M&T Bank Stadium; Baltimore, Maryland
- Champions: Johns Hopkins (9th title)
- Runner-up: Duke (3rd title game)
- Semifinalists: Cornell (10th Final Four); Delaware (1st Final Four)
- Winning coach: Dave Pietramala (2nd title)
- MOP: Jesse Schwartzman, Johns Hopkins
- Attendance: 52,004 semi-finals 48,443 finals 100,447 total
- Top scorer: Matt Danowski, Duke (24 goals)

The 2007 NCAA Division I lacrosse tournament was the 37th annual tournament hosted by the National Collegiate Athletic Association to determine the team champion of men's college lacrosse among its Division I programs, held at the end of the 2007 NCAA Division I men's lacrosse season. The tournament was held from May 12–28, 2007.

Johns Hopkins won their ninth national title, defeating Duke in the final 12–11. Johns Hopkins was led by Paul Rabil and coach Dave Pietramala, and Duke was led by Zack Greer and Matt Danowski.

The championship game was played at M&T Bank Stadium, the home of the NFL's Baltimore Ravens, in Baltimore, Maryland, with a crowd of 48,443 fans. The first round of the tournament was played on May 12 and May 13 at the home field of the top-seeded team. The quarterfinals were held on May 19 and May 20 on two separate neutral fields: the Navy–Marine Corps Memorial Stadium in Annapolis, Maryland, and Princeton Stadium in Princeton, New Jersey. The tournament culminated with the championship weekend, which included the Division II and Division III championships, semifinals and finals held on Memorial Day weekend.

Delaware, led by Alex Smith made it to the Final Four for the first time in school history.

== Qualifying ==
Sixteen NCAA Division I college men's lacrosse teams met after having played their way through a regular season, and for some, a conference tournament.

No teams made their debut appearance in the Division I men's lacrosse tournament.

== Tournament results ==
First Round; May 12–13
1	Duke	18
Providence	3
Navy	8
8	North Carolina	12
5	Albany	19
Loyola Maryland	10
Towson	6
4	Cornell	14
3	Johns Hopkins	11*
Notre Dame	10
Princeton	8
6	Georgetown	9*
7	Maryland	9
UMBC	13
Delaware	14
2	Virginia	8

Quarterfinals; May 19–20
1	Duke	19
8	North Carolina	11
5	Albany	11
4	Cornell	12*
3	Johns Hopkins	14
6	Georgetown	6
UMBC	6
Delaware	10

Semifinals; May 26
1	Duke	12
4	Cornell	11
3	Johns Hopkins	8
Delaware	3

Final; May 28
1	Duke	11
3	Johns Hopkins	12

- * = Overtime

== Notes ==
- The championship game was played in front of 48,443 fans, a tournament record
- 100,447 fans attended the tournament, a new NCAA attendance record

== See also ==
- 2007 NCAA Division I women's lacrosse tournament
- 2007 NCAA Division II men's lacrosse tournament
- 2007 NCAA Division III men's lacrosse tournament
