= Notre Dame Fighting Irish men's lacrosse =

American college lacrosse team

- Founded: 1964 (Club) 1981 (varsity)
- University: University of Notre Dame
- Athletic director: Pete Bevacqua
- Head coach: Kevin Corrigan (since 1989 season)
- Stadium: Arlotta Family Lacrosse Stadium (capacity: 2,500)
- Location: Notre Dame, Indiana
- Conference: Atlantic Coast Conference
- Nickname: Fighting Irish
- Colors: Blue and gold

NCAA Tournament championships
- 2023, 2024

NCAA Tournament Runner-Up
- 2010, 2014, 2026

NCAA Tournament Final Fours
- 2001, 2010, 2012, 2014, 2015, 2023, 2024, 2026

NCAA Tournament Quarterfinals
- 1995, 2000, 2001, 2008, 2010, 2011, 2012, 2013, 2014, 2015, 2016, 2017, 2019, 2021, 2023, 2024, 2025, 2026

NCAA Tournament appearances
- 1990, 1992, 1993, 1994, 1995, 1996, 1997, 1999, 2000, 2001, 2006, 2007, 2008, 2009, 2010, 2011, 2012, 2013, 2014, 2015, 2016, 2017, 2018, 2019, 2021, 2023, 2024, 2025, 2026

Conference Tournament championships
- 2008, 2009, 2014, 2018, 2024

Conference regular season championships
- 1982, 1984, 1985, 1986, 1988, 1990, 1992, 1993, 1994, 1995, 1996, 1997, 1999, 2000, 2001, 2002, 2003, 2007, 2008, 2009, 2012, 2015, 2016, 2022, 2024, 2025, 2026

The Notre Dame Fighting Irish men's lacrosse team represents the University of Notre Dame in NCAA Division I men's college lacrosse. Notre Dame competes as a member of the Atlantic Coast Conference and plays its home games at Arlotta Family Lacrosse Stadium or the indoor Loftus Sports Center before it is warm enough outside each season, in Notre Dame, Indiana.

== History ==
Notre Dame men's lacrosse was a club sport, started by Jack Tate ND '64, until it became a varsity program in the 1981 season. Former Notre Dame Athletic Director Jack Swarbrick was a midfielder on Notre Dame's club lacrosse team during his undergraduate years (1972–76) before the team acquired varsity status. In their 17 seasons as a club ('64–'80), the Irish compiled a 114–91 record with wins over Ohio State, Michigan, Denver, Air Force and Georgetown. From 1981 to 1993, Notre Dame competed in the Midwest Lacrosse Association. From 1994 to 2009, it was then a member of the Great Western Lacrosse League. In 2010, it became a member of the newly established Big East men's lacrosse conference. In 2012, Notre Dame announced that it would be joining the Atlantic Coast Conference. From 1981 to 1988, the program was led by head coach Rich O'Leary, who established a career record of 64–42 (.604), after which Kevin Corrigan took over as head coach, beginning in 1989. Within ten years as a varsity program, the Fighting Irish made its first appearance in the NCAA championship tournament in 1990, and since then has regularly appeared there. In 2001, the fifth-seeded Irish reached the semi-final round (Final Four) for the first time after defeating Bucknell 12–7 and fourth-seeded Johns Hopkins 13–9 in earlier rounds, and finished the season with a 14–2 record and a #4 ranking in the nation.

Since 2006, Notre Dame has made the NCAA championship tournament every year except 2022. In 2009, the Irish went undefeated in the regular season, reaching #2 in national polls, and finished with an overall record of 15–1, with five players receiving All-America honors. In the fall of 2009, Notre Dame opened its new lacrosse-specific outdoor stadium, Arlotta Stadium, with 2,500 seats, an artificial turf field, locker rooms, restrooms, and concession areas. In 2010, the Irish began play in the new Big East men's lacrosse conference and went 7–6 in the regular season before advancing to the NCAA tournament as an unseeded selection, where it upset higher seeds Princeton, Maryland, and Cornell before being defeated by fifth-seeded Duke, 6–5 in overtime of the championship game. In 2011, Notre Dame went 10–2 in the regular season, reaching #1 in national polls, and advanced to the quarterfinal round of the NCAA tournament before losing to Duke, 7–5. In 2012, the Irish went 13–3, defeating ranked opponents Duke, Denver, Syracuse, and defending national champion Virginia before losing to the number one seed and eventual national champion Loyola 7–5 in the semi-final round of the NCAA Tournament. In 2013, the Irish finished with an 11–5 record and advanced to the quarterfinal round of the tournament, losing to eventual champion Duke, 12–11.

Notre Dame won the 2023 NCAA National Championship. They defeated Duke 13–9 with Senior goalie Liam Entenmann making 18 saves. They went 10–2 in the regular season and were awarded the three seed in the NCAA tournament. They defeated Utah in the first round of the playoffs, Johns Hopkins in the quarter-finals, and Virginia in the semi-finals before defeating Duke. The Irish repeated as national champions in 2024, posting a 16–1 record. They defeated Maryland 15–5 in the national championship game.

In the history of the program, Notre Dame has produced numerous All-Americans: Mike Iorio (1993, 1994, 1995); Randy Colley (1994, 1995); Todd Rassas (1996, 1997, 1998); Alex Cade (1996); Jimmy Keenan (1996, 1997, 1998); Chris Dusseau (1999); Tom Glatzel (2000, 2001); David Ulrich (2000, 2001); Kirk Howell (2001); Steve Bishko (2001); Mike Adams (2001); AJ Wright (2002); Pat Walsh (2003, 2004, 2005); DJ Driscoll (2005, 2006); Joey Kemp (2006, 2007, 2008); Brian Hubschmann (2007); Sean Dougherty (2007, 2008); Michael Podgajny (2007, 2008); Will Yeatman (2007); Ryan Hoff (2008, 2009); Regis McDermott (2009); Sam Barnes (2009); Grant Krebs (2009, 2010); Scott Rodgers (2009, 2010); Zach Brenneman (2010, 2011); David Earl (2010, 2011); Kevin Ridgway (2010, 2011); Sam Barnes (2011), Andrew Irving (2011), John Kemp (2011, 2012, 2013), Kevin Randall (2012), Jim Marlatt (2012, 2013), Matt Miller (2012, 2013), and Matt Kavanagh (2013, 2014).

In addition, several Notre Dame players have been Tewaaraton Trophy nominees: Tom Glatzel (2001), David Ulrich (2001), Pat Walsh (2004, 2005), Joey Kemp (2008), Scott Rodgers (2009, 2010), Grant Krebs (2010), David Earl (2011), Kevin Ridgway (2011), John Kemp (2012, 2013), Matt Landis (2016), and Pat Kavanagh (2021, 2023)

Under current coach Kevin Corrigan, the Irish have an overall record of 241–114 (.679) through the 2013 season. The program has a 100% graduation rate since it was started in 1981. Corrigan has been selected as the GWLL Coach of the Year fives times, including in 2009, which was the conference's final season before the establishment of the Big East men's lacrosse conference.

At the beginning of its games, the Irish team is traditionally led onto the playing field by a teammate playing the bagpipes, a tradition that was begun during the 1996 season by then-freshman Sean Meehan and has since been passed down to other players including Chad DeBolt, Daniel Hickey, Regis McDermott, Colt Power, Ryan Mix, Edwin Glazener, Tommy McNamara, Ross Burgmaster and Brian Tevlin.

== Season Results ==
The following is a list of Notre Dame's results by season as an NCAA Division I program:

Season	Coach	Overall	Conference	Standing	Postseason
Rich O’Leary (Midwest Lacrosse Association) (1981–1988)
1981	Rich O’Leary	6–6	5–5		
1982	Rich O’Leary	9–6	7–3	1st	
1983	Rich O’Leary	6–7	5–4		
1984	Rich O’Leary	9–3	8–1	1st	
1985	Rich O’Leary	9–7	5–0	1st	
1986	Rich O’Leary	9–4	5–1	1st	
1987	Rich O’Leary	6–5	3–1	2nd	
1988	Rich O’Leary	10–4	3–1	T–1st	
Rich O’Leary:		64–42 (.604)	41–16 (.719)		
Kevin Corrigan (Midwest Lacrosse Association) (1989–1993)
1989	Kevin Corrigan	7–6	1–2		
1990	Kevin Corrigan	9–7	3–0	1st	NCAA Division I First Round
1991	Kevin Corrigan	7–7	2–1		
1992	Kevin Corrigan	10–5	2–1	1st	NCAA Division I First Round
1993	Kevin Corrigan	11–3	3–0	1st	NCAA Division I First Round
Kevin Corrigan (Great Western Lacrosse League) (1994–2009)
1994	Kevin Corrigan	10–2	3–0	1st	NCAA Division I First Round
1995	Kevin Corrigan	9–5	4–0	1st	NCAA Division I Quarterfinals
1996	Kevin Corrigan	9–4	4–0	1st	NCAA Division I First Round
1997	Kevin Corrigan	9–3	3–0	1st	NCAA Division I First Round
1998	Kevin Corrigan	5–7	2–1	2nd	
1999	Kevin Corrigan	8–6	3–1	T–1st	NCAA Division I First Round
2000	Kevin Corrigan	10–4	5–0	1st	NCAA Division I Quarterfinals
2001	Kevin Corrigan	14–2	5–0	1st	NCAA Division I Final Four
2002	Kevin Corrigan	5–8	4–1	T–1st	
2003	Kevin Corrigan	9–5	4–1	T–1st	
2004	Kevin Corrigan	7–5	4–1	2nd	
2005	Kevin Corrigan	7–4	3–2	3rd	
2006	Kevin Corrigan	10–5	3–2	2nd	NCAA Division I First Round
2007	Kevin Corrigan	11–4	5–0	1st	NCAA Division I First Round
2008	Kevin Corrigan	14–3	4–1	T–1st	NCAA Division I Quarterfinals
2009	Kevin Corrigan	15–1	5–0	1st	NCAA Division I First Round
Kevin Corrigan (Big East Conference) (2010–2013)
2010	Kevin Corrigan	10–7	2–4	4th	NCAA Division I Runner–Up
2011	Kevin Corrigan	11–3	5–1	2nd	NCAA Division I Quarterfinals
2012	Kevin Corrigan	13–3	6–0	1st	NCAA Division I Final Four
2013	Kevin Corrigan	11–5	4–2	3rd	NCAA Division I Quarterfinals
Kevin Corrigan (Atlantic Coast Conference) (2014–Present)
2014	Kevin Corrigan	12–6	2–3	T–3rd	NCAA Division I Runner–Up
2015	Kevin Corrigan	12–3	4–0	1st	NCAA Division I Final Four
2016	Kevin Corrigan	11–4	3–1	T–1st	NCAA Division I Quarterfinals
2017	Kevin Corrigan	9–6	2–2	3rd	NCAA Division I Quarterfinals
2018	Kevin Corrigan	9–6	1–3	T–3rd	NCAA Division I First Round
2019	Kevin Corrigan	9–7	2–2	T–2nd	NCAA Division I Quarterfinals
2020	Kevin Corrigan	2–3	0–0	†	†
2021	Kevin Corrigan	8–4	3–3	3rd	NCAA Division I Quarterfinals
2022	Kevin Corrigan	8–4	5–1	T–1st	
2023	Kevin Corrigan	14–2	4–2	T–2nd	NCAA Division I Champion
2024	Kevin Corrigan	16–1	4–0	1st	NCAA Division I Champion
2025	Kevin Corrigan	9–5	3–1	T–1st	NCAA Division I Quarterfinals
2026	Kevin Corrigan	12–2	3–1	1st	NCAA Division I Runner–Up
Kevin Corrigan:		370–165 (.692)	124–39 (.761)		
Total:		434–207 (.677)			
National champion Postseason invitational champion Conference regular season champion Conference regular season and conference tournament champion Division regular season champion Division regular season and conference tournament champion Conference tournament champion

†NCAA canceled 2020 collegiate activities due to the COVID-19 virus.

== Alumni in the Premier Lacrosse League (16) ==
Year Drafted	Name	Position	Height	Weight	Drafted By	Draft Pick	Current Team	All Star	Accolades
2015	Jack Near	D Midfield	6'2	200	Rochester Rattlers (MLL)	1st round (7th overall)	Redwoods LC	None	None
2016	Matt Kavanagh	Attack	5'8	180	Denver Outlaws (MLL)	1st round (5th overall)	Cannons LC	1x All Star ('19)	None
2016	Eddy Glazener	Defense	6'4	220	Undrafted	Undrafted	Redwoods LC	1x All Star ('21)	None
2017	Sergio Perkovic	Midfield	6'4	225	Boston Cannons (MLL)	1st round (2nd overall)	Redwoods LC	2x All Star ('19,'21)	None
2017	Garrett Epple	Defense	6'1	215	Atlanta Blaze (MLL)	2nd round (18th overall)	Redwoods LC	3x All Star ('19,'21,'22)	Defensive Player of the Year ('23)
2018	John Sexton	LSM	5'10	210	Dallas Rattlers (MLL)	2nd round (18th overall)	Redwoods LC	None	None
2019	Ryder Garnsey	Attack	5'9	176	Undrafted	Undrafted	Redwoods LC	1x All Star ('23)	None
2019	Hugh Crance	Defense	6'0	198	Undrafted	Undrafted	Redwoods LC	None	None
2020	Bryan Costabile	Midfield	6'2	205	Atlas LC	1st round (2nd overall)	Atlas LC	3x All Star ('21,'22,'23)	None
2021	Jack Kielty	Defense	6'2	225	Cannons LC	2nd round (9th overall)	Cannons LC	None	None
2021	Kyle Gallagher	Faceoff specialist	5'11	210	Chaos LC	2nd round (14th overall)	Chrome LC	None	None
2022	Arden Cohen	Defense	6'2	220	Redwoods LC	1st round (3rd overall)	Redwoods LC	None	None
2022	Wheaton Jackoboice	Midfield	6'2	205	Whipsnakes LC	2nd round (15th overall)	Whipsnakes LC	None	None
2022	Ryan Hallenbeck	D Midfield	6'3	199	Undrafted	Undrafted	Redwoods LC	None	None
2023	Brian Tevlin	Midfield	5'11	185	Redwoods LC	2nd round (10th overall)	Redwoods LC	None	None
2023	Chris Fake	Defense	6'1	205	Waterdogs LC	3rd round (24th overall)	Waterdogs LC	None	None
