= Yale Bulldogs men's lacrosse =

American university lacrosse team

- Founded: 1882; 144 years ago
- University: Yale University
- Head coach: Andy Shay (since 2003 season)
- Stadium: Reese Stadium (capacity: 3,000)
- Location: New Haven, Connecticut
- Conference: Ivy League
- Nickname: Bulldogs
- Colors: Yale blue and white

Pre-NCAA era championships
- 1883

NCAA Tournament championships
- 2018

NCAA Tournament Runner-Up
- 2019

NCAA Tournament Final Fours
- 1990, 2018, 2019

NCAA Tournament Quarterfinals
- 1990, 1992, 2013, 2018, 2019, 2022

NCAA Tournament appearances
- (13) 1988, 1990, 1992, 2012, 2013, 2015, 2016, 2017, 2018, 2019, 2022, 2023, 2026

Conference Tournament championships
- 2012, 2013, 2015, 2016, 2017

Conference regular season championships
- 1956, 1969, 1988, 1989, 1990, 2010, 2017, 2018, 2022

The Yale Bulldogs men's lacrosse team represents Yale University in National Collegiate Athletic Association (NCAA) Division I men's lacrosse. Yale competes as a member of the Ivy League and plays their home games at Reese Stadium in New Haven, Connecticut. The Bulldogs have captured the Ivy League championship five times. Yale is credited, alongside Harvard and Princeton, with the 1883 national championship.

On May 28, 2018, the Bulldogs defeated Duke to claim their second ever national title and first NCAA championship in the sport. Yale returned to the championship game the following year, but lost to the Virginia Cavaliers in the 2019 championship final.

== History ==
The first Yale lacrosse team was fielded in 1882 and joined the Intercollegiate Lacrosse Association the following year.

Yale has made ten appearances in the NCAA tournament since its establishment in 1971. Their first appearance was in 1988, when they were eliminated in double overtime by Virginia, 10–9. In 1990, Yale earned a first-round bye, and then defeated Princeton, 17–9, for their first NCAA tournament win. The Bulldogs fell in the semifinals to Loyola, 14–13 in double overtime. Yale returned to the NCAA tournament in 1992, advancing through the first round with a win against Navy, 9–3, before being eliminated by Syracuse, 17–8.

Yale finished the 2010 season with a 10–4 record, but an Ivy League tournament semifinal loss to Princeton and a weak RPI kept them out of the NCAA field. The team finished the season ranked 18th in the Nike/Inside Lacrosse Men's Division I Media Poll.

Since 2010, under the direction of head coach Andy Shay, Yale has won ten or more games every season except 2014 when they won 9. During that time they won or shared four Ivy League regular season titles, including 2 outright, as well as participating in every Ivy League tournament since its inception in 2010, winning five of them. In addition during that span the Bulldogs have made 7 NCAA tournament appearances, winning 8 NCAA tournament games, culminating in a national championship in 2018, followed by a national championship runner-up finish in 2019.

== Season results ==
The following is a list of Yale's results by season as an NCAA Division I program:

Season	Coach	Overall	Conference	Standing	Postseason
Bob McHenry (Ivy League) (1970–1980)
1970	Bob McHenry	8–4	4–2	3rd	
1971	Bob McHenry	5–7	3–3	4th	
1972	Bob McHenry	7–8	4–2	T–2nd	
1973	Bob McHenry	4–8	1–5	T–6th	
1974	Bob McHenry	3–8	0–6	7th	
1975	Bob McHenry	7–7	2–4	5th	
1976	Bob McHenry	6–8	0–6	7th	
1977	Bob McHenry	6–8	1–5	T–5th	
1978	Bob McHenry	5–8	1–5	T–6th	
1979	Bob McHenry	7–7	1–5	6th	
1980	Bob McHenry	3–11	0–6	7th	
Bob McHenry:		61–84 (.421)	17–49 (.258)		
Mike Waldvogel (Ivy League) (1981–2002)
1981	Mike Waldvogel	6–8	0–6	7th	
1982	Mike Waldvogel	3–10	0–6	7th	
1983	Mike Waldvogel	5–10	0–6	7th	
1984	Mike Waldvogel	4–9	1–5	T–6th	
1985	Mike Waldvogel	10–3	4–2	T–2nd	
1986	Mike Waldvogel	5–9	2–4	5th	
1987	Mike Waldvogel	6–7	2–4	5th	
1988	Mike Waldvogel	12–4	5–1	T–1st	NCAA Division I First Round
1989	Mike Waldvogel	10–5	5–1	1st	
1990	Mike Waldvogel	16–2	5–1	T–1st	NCAA Division I Final Four
1991	Mike Waldvogel	8–7	3–3	T–3rd	
1992	Mike Waldvogel	12–4	5–1	2nd	NCAA Division I Quarterfinals
1993	Mike Waldvogel	7–6	3–3	T–3rd	
1994	Mike Waldvogel	8–6	4–2	3rd	
1995	Mike Waldvogel	5–9	2–4	T–5th	
1996	Mike Waldvogel	9–5	4–2	3rd	
1997	Mike Waldvogel	5–9	1–5	T–6th	
1998	Mike Waldvogel	5–9	2–4	T–5th	
1999	Mike Waldvogel	7–6	4–2	T–2nd	
2000	Mike Waldvogel	8–5	3–3	T–3rd	
2001	Mike Waldvogel	6–7	3–3	T–3rd	
2002	Mike Waldvogel	9–4	4–2	T–2nd	
Mike Waldvogel:		166–144 (.535)	62–70 (.470)		
Daryl Delia (Ivy League) (2002–2003)
2003	Daryl Delia	9–5	2–4	T–4th	
Daryl Delia:		9–5 (.643)	2–4 (.333)		
Andy Shay (Ivy League) (2004–Present)
2004	Andy Shay	6–8	1–5	7th	
2005	Andy Shay	7–5–1	3–3	4th	
2006	Andy Shay	6–8	1–5	6th	
2007	Andy Shay	7–6	2–4	5th	
2008	Andy Shay	4–10	0–6	7th	
2009	Andy Shay	5–8	1–5	T–6th	
2010	Andy Shay	10–4	4–2	T–1st	
2011	Andy Shay	10–4	3–3	T–3rd	
2012	Andy Shay	11–5	4–2	T–2nd	NCAA Division I First Round
2013	Andy Shay	12–5	4–2	2nd	NCAA Division I Quarterfinals
2014	Andy Shay	9–5	3–3	4th	
2015	Andy Shay	11–5	3–3	T–4th	NCAA Division I First Round
2016	Andy Shay	13–3	5–1	2nd	NCAA Division I First Round
2017	Andy Shay	10–6	5–1	1st	NCAA Division I First Round
2018	Andy Shay	17–3	6–0	1st	NCAA Division I Champion
2019	Andy Shay	15–4	5–1	2nd	NCAA Division I Runner–Up
2020	Andy Shay	3–1	0–0	†	†
2021	Andy Shay	0–0	0–0	††	††
2022	Andy Shay	12–5	4–2	T–1st	NCAA Division I Quarterfinals
2023	Andy Shay	9–6	3–3	4th	NCAA Division I First Round
2024	Andy Shay	11–4	4–2	T–2nd	
2025	Andy Shay	5–8	3–3	4th	
2026	Andy Shay	9–6	4–2	3rd	NCAA Division I First Round
Andy Shay:		202–119–1 (.629)	68–58 (.540)		
Total:		706–556–6 (.559)			
National champion Postseason invitational champion Conference regular season champion Conference regular season and conference tournament champion Division regular season champion Division regular season and conference tournament champion Conference tournament champion

†NCAA canceled 2020 collegiate activities due to the COVID-19 virus.
†† Ivy League cancelled 2021 collegiate season due to the COVID-19 virus.
