= America East Conference men's lacrosse tournament =

- Conference lacrosse championship
- Sport: College lacrosse
- Conference: America East Conference
- Number of teams: 4
- Format: Single-elimination tournament
- Played: 2000–present
- Last contest: 2026
- Current champion: Albany Great Danes
- Most championships: Albany Great Danes (12)
- TV partner: America East TV
- Official website: Official website

The America East Conference's Men's Lacrosse Tournament began in 2000, with the winner of the tournament receiving the conference's automatic bid into the NCAA Men's Lacrosse Championship.

== Tournament ==
The America East Conference Tournament is a four team single-elimination tournament held annually at various locations in the America East Conference region. At the end of the regular season, the four teams with the best conference record earn berths in the tournament. The winner receives an automatic bid to the NCAA Men's Lacrosse Championship. The other teams, on the other hand, have to hope for an at-large bid into the NCAA Men's Lacrosse Championship.

== History ==
The America East Conference tournament began in 2000. From 1992 through 1999 no tournament for the conference was held. Instead the regular season champion received the automatic bid to the NCAA Men's Lacrosse Championship.

== Tournament Champions ==
Year	Champion	Runner-up	Score	Location	MOP	Winning teams Head Coach
2000	Hofstra	Delaware	14-4	Higher seed	Tom Kessler, Hofstra	John Danowski
2001	Towson	Hofstra	13-11	Higher seed	Ryan Nash, Towson	Tony Seaman
2002	Stony Brook	Albany	8-6	Higher seed	Denis Scannel, Stony Brook	John Espey
2003	Albany	Hartford	7-5	Higher seed	Kevin Rae, Albany	Scott Marr
2004	Albany	Binghamton	10-4	Higher seed	Kevin Rae, Albany	Scott Marr
2005	Albany	Stony Brook	16-7	Higher seed	Kevin Rae, Albany	Scott Marr
2006	UMBC	Albany	19-10	Baltimore, Maryland	Brendan Mundorf, UMBC	Don Zimmerman
2007	Albany	UMBC	15-14	Albany, New York	Merrick Thomson, Albany	Scott Marr
2008	UMBC	Albany	14-13	Baltimore, Maryland	Terry Kimener, UMBC	Don Zimmerman
2009	UMBC	Stony Brook	11-7	Higher seed	Mike Camardo, UMBC	Don Zimmerman
2010	Stony Brook	Albany	11-7	Higher seed	Charlie Paar, Stony Brook	Rick Sowell
2011	Hartford	Stony Brook	11-10	Higher seed	Tim Fallon, Hartford	Peter Lawrence
2012	Stony Brook	Stony Brook	14-8	Higher seed	Sean Brady, Stony Brook	Jim Nagel
2013	Albany	UMBC	19-10	Stony Brook, New York	Lyle Thompson, Albany	Scott Marr
2014	Albany	UMBC	20-11	Stony Brook, New York	Lyle Thompson, Albany	Scott Marr
2015	Albany	Stony Brook	22-9	Albany, New York	Lyle Thompson, Albany	Scott Marr
2016	Hartford	Vermont	17-16	Albany, New York	Dylan Protesto, Albany	Peter Lawrence
2017	Albany	Binghamton	20-8	Albany, New York	Connor Fields, Albany	Scott Marr
2018	Albany	Vermont	14-4	Albany, New York	TD Ierlan, Albany	Scott Marr
2019	UMBC	Vermont	14-13	Stony Brook, New York	Trevor Patschorke, UMBC	Ryan Moran
2021	Vermont	Albany	15-10	Catonsville, Maryland	Tommy Burke, Vermont	Chris Feifs
2022	Vermont	UMBC	13-11	Burlington, Vermont	Thomas McConvey, Vermont	Chris Feifs
2023	Bryant	Albany	12-11	Burlington, Vermont	Kevin Groeninger, Bryant	Brad Ross
2024	Albany	Vermont	12-11	Albany, New York	Jake Piseno, Albany	Scott Marr
2025	Albany	Bryant	12-9	Smithfield, Rhode Island	Brady Smith, Albany	Scott Marr
2026	Albany	Vermont	14-11	Albany, New York	Ryan Doherty, Albany	Scott Marr

== Performance By School ==
School	Record	Winning pct	Championships	Runners-up	Appearances
Albany	23–8	.742	9	5	17
Hofstra*	3–1	.750	1	1	2
Delaware*	1–2	.333	0	1	2
Towson*	2-1	.667	1	0	2
Quinnipiac*	0-1	.000	0	0	1
UMBC	11-9	.550	4	3	13
Stony Brook*	10-15	.400	3	4	18
Binghamton	2-9	.182	0	2	9
Hartford*	5-6	.455	2	1	8
Vermont	3-7	.300	2	3	7

* former member of the conference
