= 2015 America East men's lacrosse tournament =

American college lacrosse tournament

The 2015 America East men's lacrosse tournament was the 16th edition of the America East Conference men's lacrosse tournament and took place from April 30 to May 2 that year at John Fallon Field in Albany, New York, United States. The winner of the tournament received the America East Conference's automatic bid to the 2015 NCAA Division I Men's Lacrosse Championship. Four teams from the America East conference will compete in the single elimination tournament. The seeds were based upon the teams' regular season conference record.

== Standings ==
Only the top four teams in the America East conference advanced to the America East Conference Tournament.

Seed	School	Conference	Overall	Tiebreakers
1	Albany‡*	6-0	16–2	
2	Stony Brooks*	5–1	13–5	
3	Vermont*	4–2	6–10	
4	Hartford*	3–3	7–8	
5	Binghamton	2-4	4-9	
6	UMBC	1–5	5-8	
7	UMass Lowell	0–6	1-13	
‡ America East regular season champions. * Qualify for the tournament.

== Schedule ==
Session	Game	Time*	Matchup^{#}	Score	Television
Semi-finals – Thursday, April 30
1	1	4:30 pm	#2 Stony Brook vs. #3 Vermont	16-13	AETV
1	2	7:00 pm	#1 Albany vs. #4 Hartford	15-6	AETV
Championship – Saturday, May 2
2	3	10:00am	#1 Albany vs. #2 Stony Brook	22-9	ESPN U
*Game times in EST. #-Rankings denote tournament seeding.

== Bracket ==
John Fallon Field - Albany, New York

Semifinals; April 30
1	Albany	15
4	Hartford	6
2	Stony Brooks	16
3	Vermont	13

Championship Game; May 2
1	Albany	22
2	Stony Brooks	9

- denotes an overtime game
