= 2012 America East Men's Lacrosse Tournament =

The 2012 America East men's lacrosse tournament was the 13 edition of the America East Conference men's lacrosse tournament and took place from May 2 to May 5 at the higher seeds home field. The winner of the tournament received the America East Conference's automatic bid to the 2012 NCAA Division I Men's Lacrosse Championship. Four teams from the America East conference will compete in the single elimination tournament. The seeds were based upon the teams' regular season conference record.

== Standings ==
Only the top four teams in the America East conference advanced to the America East Conference Tournament.

Seed	School	Conference	Overall	Tiebreakers
1	Stony Brooks‡*	4-1	7–10	
2	UMBC*	3–2	5-8	1-0 vs. Albany and Hartford
3	Albany*	3-2	5–11	1-0 vs. Hartford and 0-1 vs. UMBC
4	Hartford*	3–2	6–9	0-1 vs. UMBC and Albany
5	Binghamton	1-4	4-9	
6	Vermont	1–4	2–12	
‡ America East regular season champions. * Qualify for the tournament.

== Schedule ==
Session	Game	Time*	Matchup^{#}	Score	Television
Semi-finals – Wednesday, May 2
1	1		#2 UMBC vs. #3 Albany	8-19	N/A
1	2		#1 Stony Brook vs. #4 Hartford	9-8	N/A
Championship – Saturday, May 5
2	3		#1 Stony Brook vs. #3 Albany	14-8	ESPN 3

== Bracket ==
Semifinals; May 2
1	Stony Brook	9
4	Hartford	8
2	UMBC	8
3	Albany	19

Championship Game; May 4
1	Stony Brook	14
3	Albany	8

- denotes an overtime game

== All-Tournament ==
Sean Brady, Stony Brook

Travis Lyons, Albany

Jeff Tundo, Stony Brook

Tate Kildonas, Hartford

Kyle Moeller, Stony Brook

Ben Knapton, Hartford

JJ Laforet, Stony Brook

Scott Jones, UMBC

Phil Poe, UMBC

Joe Resetarits, Albany

Lyle Thompson, Albany

Most Outstanding Player

Sean Brady, Stony Brook
