= 2010 America East Men's Lacrosse Tournament =

The 2010 America East men's lacrosse tournament was the 11th edition of the America East Conference men's lacrosse tournament and took place from May 4 to May 8 at the higher seeds home field. The winner of the tournament received the America East Conference's automatic bid to the 2010 NCAA Division I Men's Lacrosse Championship. Four teams from the America East conference will compete in the single elimination tournament. The seeds were based upon the teams' regular season conference record.

== Standings ==
Only the top four teams in the America East conference advanced to the America East Conference Tournament.

Seed	School	Conference	Overall	Tiebreakers
1	Stony Brooks‡*	5-0	13–4	
2	UMBC*	3–2	6-7	1-0 vs. Albany
3	Albany*	3-2	4–9	0-1 vs. UMBC
4	Vermont*	2–3	3–13	
5	Binghamton	1-4	4-10	
6	Hartford	1–4	4–10	
‡ America East regular season champions. * Qualify for the tournament.

== Schedule ==
Session	Game	Time*	Matchup^{#}	Score	Television
Semi-finals – Tuesday, May 4
1	1		#1 Stony Brook vs. #4 Vermont	10-6	N/A
Semi-finals – Wednesday, May 5
2	2		#2 UMBC vs. #3 Albany	7-11	N/A
Championship – Saturday, May 8
3	3		#1 Stony Brook vs. #3 Albany	11-7	AETV

== Bracket ==
Semifinals; May 4–5
1	Stony Brook	10
4	Vermont	6
2	UMBC	7
3	Albany	11

Championship Game; May 8
1	Stony Brook	11
3	Albany	7

- denotes an overtime game

== All-Tournament ==
All-Tournament team is made up of the best players at each position from throughout the tournament. The All-Tournament team consisted of the following players:

Robbie Campbell, Stony Brook

Kevin Crowley, Stony Brook

Charlie Paar, Stony Brook (Most Outstanding Player) (GK)

Steve Waldeck, Stony Brook

Dave Brock, Albany

John Carroll, Albany (GK)

Kyle Crotty, Albany

Maxx Davis, UMBC

Rob Grimm, UMBC

A.J. Masson, Vermont

Drew Philie, Vermont

Most Outstanding Player

Charlie Paar, Stony Brook (GK)
