= 2011 America East Men's Lacrosse Tournament =

The 2011 America East men's lacrosse tournament was the 12th edition of the America East Conference men's lacrosse tournament and took place from May 4 to May 7 at the higher seeds home field. The winner of the tournament received the America East Conference's automatic bid to the 2011 NCAA Division I Men's Lacrosse Championship. Four teams from the America East conference will compete in the single elimination tournament. The seeds were based upon the teams' regular season conference record.

== Standings ==
Only the top four teams in the America East conference advanced to the America East Conference Tournament.

| Seed | School | Conference | Overall | Tiebreakers |
|---|---|---|---|---|
| 1 | Stony Brooks‡* | 5-0 | 10–4 | |
| 2 | Hartford* | 3–2 | 11–7 | |
| 3 | UMBC* | 3–2 | 6-7 | |
| 4 | Binghamton* | 3-2 | 7-8 | |
| 5 | Vermont | 1–4 | 6–9 | |
| 6 | Albany | 0-5 | 5–10 | |
‡ America East regular season champions. * Qualify for the tournament.

== Schedule ==
| Session | Game | Time* | Matchup^{#} | Score | Television |
Semi-finals – Wednesday, May 4
| 1 | 1 | | #2 Hartford vs. #3 UMBC | 14-11 | N/A |
| 1 | 2 | | #1 Stony Brook vs. #4 Binghamton | 12-8 | N/A |
Championship – Saturday, May 7
| 2 | 3 | | #1 Stony Brook vs. #2 Hartford | 10-11 | CBSSN |

== Bracket ==
Semifinals; May 4
1 | Stony Brook | 12
4 | Binghamton | 8
2 | Hartford | 14
3 | UMBC | 11

Championship Game; May 7
1 | Stony Brook | 10
3 | Hartford | 11

- denotes an overtime game

== All-Tournament ==
Scott Bement, Hartford (GK)

Conor Flynn, Hartford

Rob Camposa, Stony Brook (GK)

Kyle Moeller, Stony Brook

Jeff Donigan, Binghamton

Tyler Perrelle, Binghamton

Rob Grimm, UMBC

David Stock, UMBC

Most Outstanding Player

Scott Bement, Hartford (GK)
