= 2009 America East Men's Lacrosse Tournament =

The 2009 America East men's lacrosse tournament was the 10th edition of the America East Conference men's lacrosse tournament and took place from April 29 to May 2 at the higher seeds home field. The winner of the tournament received the America East Conference's automatic bid to the 2009 NCAA Division I Men's Lacrosse Championship. Four teams from the America East conference will compete in the single elimination tournament. The seeds were based upon the teams' regular season conference record.

== Standings ==
Only the top four teams in the America East conference advanced to the America East Conference Tournament.

Seed	School	Conference	Overall	Tiebreakers
1	UMBC‡*	4–1	12-4	1-0 vs. Stony Brook
2	Stony Brooks*	4-1	9-6	0-1 vs. UMBC
3	Albany*	3-2	7–7	
4	Binghamton*	2-3	3-12	
5	Vermont	1–4	4–10	
6	Hartford	1–4	2–11	
‡ America East regular season champions. * Qualify for the tournament.

== Schedule ==
Session	Game	Time*	Matchup^{#}	Score	Television
Semi-finals – Wednesday, April 29
1	1		#1 UMBC vs. #4 Binghamton	9-8	N/A
1	2		#2 Stony Brook vs. #3 Albany	18-12	N/A
Championship – Saturday, May 2
2	3		#1 UMBC vs. #2 Stony Brook	11-7	N/A

== Bracket ==
Semifinals; April 29
1	UMBC	9*
4	Binghamton	8
2	Stony Brook	18
3	Albany	12

Championship Game; May 2
1	UMBC	11
3	Stony Brook	7

- denotes an overtime game

== All-Tournament ==
Brian Caufield, Albany

Corey Small, Albany

Larry Kline, Binghamton

Chris Mulheron, Binghamton

Kevin Crowley, Stony Brook

Chris Gignilliat, Stony Brook

Steve Waldeck, Stony Brook

Jeremy Blevins, UMBC

Mike Camardo, UMBC

Justin Radebaugh, UMBC

Ryan Smith, UMBC

Most Outstanding Player

Mike Camardo, UMBC
