= 2014 America East Men's Lacrosse Tournament =

The 2014 America East men's lacrosse tournament was the 15th edition of the America East Conference men's lacrosse tournament and took place from May 1 to May 3 that year at Kenneth P. LaValle Stadium in Stony Brook, New York. The winner of the tournament received the America East Conference's automatic bid to the 2014 NCAA Division I Men's Lacrosse Championship. Four teams from the America East conference will compete in the single elimination tournament. The seeds were based upon the teams' regular season conference record.

== Standings ==
Only the top four teams in the America East conference advanced to the America East Conference Tournament.

Seed	School	Conference	Overall	Tiebreakers
1	Albany‡*	5-0	16–2	
2	Binghamton*	4-1	7-8	
3	UMBC*	3–2	8-7	
4	Stony Brooks*	2-3	6–10	
5	Hartford	1–4	6–9	
6	Vermont	0–5	5–8	
‡ America East regular season champions. * Qualify for the tournament.

== Schedule ==
Session	Game	Time*	Matchup^{#}	Score	Television
Semi-finals – Thursday, May 1
1	1	5:00 pm	#2 Binghamton vs. #3 UMBC	10-16	AETV
1	2	7:30 pm	#1 Albany vs. #4 Stony Brook	15-6	AETV
Championship – Saturday, May 2
2	3	10:00am	#1 Albany vs. #3 UMBC	20-11	ESPN U
*Game times in EST. #-Rankings denote tournament seeding.

== Bracket ==
Kenneth P. LaValle Stadium - Stony Brook, New York

Semifinals; May 1
1	Albany	17*
4	Stony Brook	16
2	Binghamton	10
3	UMBC	16

Championship Game; May 3
1	Albany	20
3	UMBC	11

- denotes an overtime game

== All-Tournament ==
Doug Eich, Albany

Lyle Thompson, Albany

Miles Thompson, Albany

Ty Thompson, Albany

Blaze Riorden, Albany

Zach Esser, UMBC

Matt Gregoire, UMBC

Phil Poe, UMBC

Michael Antinozzi, Binghamton

Greg Cove, Binghamton

Mike Andreassi, Stony Brook

Hayden Johnstone, Stony Brook

Most Outstanding Player Lyle Thompson, Albany

Most Outstanding Goalie Blaze Riorden, Albany

== Tournament notes ==
- Just like in the previous year's tournament Albany and Stony Brook again set a tournament record of combined goals with 33.
