= 2013 America East Men's Lacrosse Tournament =

The 2013 America East men's lacrosse tournament was the 14 edition of the America East Conference men's lacrosse tournament and took place from May 2 to May 4 at Kenneth P. LaValle Stadium in Stony Brook, New York. The winner of the tournament received the America East Conference's automatic bid to the 2013 NCAA Division I Men's Lacrosse Championship. Four teams from the America East conference will compete in the single elimination tournament. The seeds were based upon the teams' regular season conference record.

== Standings ==
Only the top four teams in the America East conference advanced to the America East Conference Tournament.

| Seed | School | Conference | Overall | Tiebreakers |
|---|---|---|---|---|
| 1 | Albany‡* | 5-0 | 16–2 | |
| 2 | Hartford* | 3–2 | 7–7 | 1-0 vs. UMBC |
| 3 | UMBC* | 3–2 | 7-8 | 0-1 vs. Hartford |
| 4 | Stony Brooks* | 2-3 | 7–9 | |
| 5 | Binghamton | 1-4 | 5-9 | |
| 6 | Vermont | 1–4 | 4–10 | |
‡ America East regular season champions. * Qualify for the tournament.

== Schedule ==
| Session | Game | Time* | Matchup^{#} | Score | Television |
Semi-finals – Thursday, May 2
| 1 | 1 | 4:30 pm | #2 Hartford vs. #3 UMBC | 13-15 | AETV |
| 1 | 2 | 7:00 pm | #1 Albany vs. #4 Stony Brook | 17-15 | AETV |
Championship – Saturday, May 4
| 2 | 3 | 10:00am | #1 Albany vs. #3 UMBC | 19–10 | ESPN U |
*Game times in EST. #-Rankings denote tournament seeding.

== Bracket ==
Kenneth P. LaValle Stadium - Stony Brook, New York

Semifinals; May 2
1 | Albany | 17
4 | Stony Brook | 15
2 | Hartford | 13
3 | UMBC | 15

Championship Game; May 4
1 | Albany | 19
3 | UMBC | 10

- denotes an overtime game

== All-Tournament ==
Kevin Glueckert, Albany

Anthony Ostrander, Albany

Lyle Thompson, Albany

Miles Thompson, Albany

Scott Jones, UMBC

Joe Lustgarten, UMBC

Phil Poe, UMBC

Jack Bobzien, Hartford

Alex Matarazzo, Hartford

Brody Eastwood, Stony Brook

Jeff Tundo, Stony Brook

Most Outstanding Player

Lyle Thompson, Albany
