= Connor Fields (lacrosse) =

American lacrosse player (born 1995)

Personal information
- Nationality: American; Canadian
- Born: October 10, 1995 (age 30) East Amherst, New York, U.S.
- Height: 5 ft 11 in (180 cm)
- Weight: 160 lb (73 kg; 11 st 6 lb)

Sport
- Position: Attack (field), Forward (box)
- Shoots: Left
- NCAA team: Albany (2018)
- NLL draft: 10th overall, 2018; San Diego Seals
- NLL team Former teams: Rochester Knighthawks; San Diego Seals; Buffalo Bandits
- MLL draft: 3rd overall, 2018; Charlotte Hounds
- MLL teams: Charlotte Hounds
- PLL team Former teams: Utah Archers; Carolina Chaos

Career highlights
- PLL: 2× Champion (2023, 2024); 2× All-Star (2019, 2023); All-Pro (2019); NLL: MVP (2025); First Team All-NLL (2025); 2× Second Team All-NLL (2023, 2024); NCAA: Jack Turnbull Award (2017); 4× All-American (2015-18); 4× First Team All-America East (2015-18); 2× America East Offensive Player of the Year (2017-18); America East Rookie of the Year (2015); Albany Great Danes all-time leading goalscorer (199)
Medal record
Representing Canada
Field lacrosse
World Lacrosse Championship
Runner-up	2023 San Diego

Connor Fields (October 10, 1995) is an American-Canadian professional lacrosse player who plays for the Utah Archers of the Premier Lacrosse League and the Rochester Knighthawks of the National Lacrosse League. He played college lacrosse at the University at Albany, where he was an All-American all four years. He was drafted by the San Diego Seals in the 2018 National Lacrosse League Entry Draft. He was also drafted in Major League Lacrosse by the Charlotte Hounds in 2018.

== College career ==
Fields was ranked as the 15th best player coming out of high school by Inside Lacrosse after four years at Bishop Timon – St. Jude High School. As a junior, Fields scored 129 goals, a New York state record, and he won two state championships. He committed to play for the University at Albany.

=== Freshman Year ===
Fields started and scored in every game his freshman year. In his first college game, he scored three goals and had three assists against Drexel. He had 7 goals and 9 points in the first half against Umass-Lowell, his most for a first half in his college career. On March 25, against Harvard, he picked up 8 ground balls, the most in his career. Albany's season ended after losing to Notre Dame in the second round of the 2015 NCAA Division I Men's Lacrosse Championship. At the end of the season, he set the record for goals in a season by a freshman, with 66. He was second in all of division one college lacrosse in average goals per game, with 3.47, and first in the America East Conference. He also made the NCAA All-Rookie team, as well as being an honorable mention All-American.

=== Sophomore Year ===
Fields came into the year as an Inside Lacrosse preseason All-American. He once again started every game for the Great Danes. On March 26, against Hartford, Fields tied his career high goals with 7 in a 13-9 victory. In early April, he had back to back 4 goal games, against Umass-Lowell and University of Vermont. Albany's season ended after losing to Syracuse in the first round of the 2016 NCAA Division I Men's Lacrosse Championship He ended the season leading the American East in both goals and points, with 44 and 73, respectively. He was nominated for the Tewaaraton Trophy and was a third team All-American by USILA.

=== Junior Year ===
As a junior, Fields was named to the Inside Lacrosse preseason All-American team. He set a career high for single game goals against UMass-Lowell on March 25 with 8. On May 13, during the first round of the 2017 NCAA Division I Men's Lacrosse Championship, he had a career high 3 forced turnovers, as well as 5 points in a win against UNC. They lost to University of Maryland in the next game 18-9 to end the season. He was an Inside Lacrosse and USILA first team All-American and a Tewaaraton Trophy finalist. He led Division 1 in points per game with 6.5, and won the Jack Turnbull Award as the nation's most outstanding attackman. At some point during the season, Fields hurt his MCL, an injury that would hamper him his senior year.

=== Senior Year ===
Fields struggled with knee pain throughout his senior season. Fields set a new career high for assists against Drexel on February 24, with 7. Fields had his career high points (12) and tied his career high in assists (7) against UMass on March 6. The Baltimore Sun named Fields the player of the week for the week of March 13 after scoring four goals and having 2 assists, including the game-winning goal with 76 seconds left. Albany made it to their first ever the Final Four, where they lost to the Yale. Fields had at least 3 points in all three games and was named to the All-Tournament team. Fields was once again named a USILA and Inside Lacrosse All-American, as well as being a Tewaaraton nominee for the third time. He graduated with 364 career points, which was the second highest total of all time at the time of his graduation, behind only former teammate Lyle Thompson. After the season it was revealed he'd been playing with a torn ACL, sprained MCL and hurt meniscus, which he'd suffered during the March 24 victory over UMass-Lowell and worsened during the April 22 loss to Yale.

=== Statistics ===
Season	Team	GP	G	A	Pts
2015	Albany	19	66	22	88
2016	Albany	16	44	29	73
2017	Albany	18	55	62	117
2018	Albany	16	34	52	86
College totals		69	199	165	364

- 5th all-time in single-season points
- 7th in career goals
- 5th all-time in career points

== Professional career ==
=== MLL ===
Fields was drafted #3 overall by the Charlotte Hounds in the 2018 Major League Lacrosse draft. He scored his first two career goals on June 23, 2018 against the Florida Launch. His season was cut short after three games due to his lingering knee injury from college. He got surgery in Buffalo for his knee shortly after playing in his final MLL game that season.

=== NLL ===
Fields was selected 10th overall in the 2018 National Lacrosse League Entry Draft by the San Diego Seals. In week 17, of the 2018 NLL season, after sitting out the rest of the season due to knee surgery, Fields made his debut. He scored his first career goal and had his first career assist against the New England Black Wolves. He only played one more regular season game that season, where he had a pair of assists. In the playoffs, Fields was able to participate in the playoffs for the Seals, where he scored a goal in an 11-12 loss.

Fields was traded from San Diego to the Buffalo Bandits on August 28, 2021 in exchange for the 13th overall pick in the 2021 NLL Draft and a second round pick in 2022.

Following one season with the Bandits, Fields was selected by the Las Vegas Desert Dogs in the 2022 NLL Expansion Draft and then immediately traded to the Rochester Knighthawks along with the first overall pick in the 2022 NLL Entry Draft in exchange for Charlie Bertrand, their first, fourth, and sixth round picks in the same draft, and their first round pick of the 2023 entry draft. He signed a three-year contract with Rochester on November 8, 2022. During the 2023 season, Fields became just the third American-born player to record 100 points in a season, after Joe Resetarits and Tom Schreiber, and second American-born player to score 50 goals in a season after Roy Colsey, leading Rochester to the playoffs for the first time in team history. Fields led all NLL forwards with 142 loose balls, becoming one of three players in NLL history, alongside John Tavares and Athan Iannucci to record 100 points and 130 loose ball recoveries in a season.

Fields was named the NLL MVP for the 2025 season, having finished in the top 10 leaguewide in goals, assists, points, and loose balls. During this season, he became just the third player ever to record three separate 110 point seasons, after Mark Matthews, Dhane Smith, and Shawn Evans.

=== PLL ===
Fields became a member of Chaos Lacrosse Club (now Carolina Chaos) of Paul Rabil’s new league, the Premier Lacrosse League for the 2019 Premier Lacrosse League season. He made the league's first ever Premier Lacrosse League All-Star Game as a member of Team Rambo. He participated in the Adidas Freestyle Challenge during all-star weekend as well. Fields ended the season tied for second in goals. He made the 2019 PLL all pro team.

Fields was traded to Archers Lacrosse Club (now Utah Archers) on February 25, 2021 in exchange for midfielder Ian MacKay.

In the 2023 season, Fields was named a finalist for the Eamon McEneaney Attackman of the Year Award. Archers went on to win the PLL Championship, although Fields missed the final with a shoulder injury.

== NLL Statistics ==
Connor Fields		Regular season									Playoffs								
Season	Team	GP	G	A	Pts	LB	PIM	Pts/GP	LB/GP	PIM/GP	GP	G	A	Pts	LB	PIM	Pts/GP	LB/GP	PIM/GP
2019	San Diego Seals	2	2	3	5	8	0	2.50	4.00	0.00	1	1	0	1	4	0	1.00	4.00	0.00
2020	San Diego Seals	12	18	26	44	73	2	3.67	6.08	0.17	–	–	–	–	–	–	–	–	–
2022	Buffalo Bandits	18	32	35	67	97	2	3.72	5.39	0.11	6	7	9	16	29	0	2.67	4.83	0.00
2023	Rochester Knighthawks	17	52	60	112	142	12	6.59	8.35	0.71	1	1	4	5	7	0	5.00	7.00	0.00
2024	Rochester Knighthawks	18	56	64	120	159	10	6.67	8.83	0.56	1	1	3	4	8	0	4.00	8.00	0.00
2025	Rochester Knighthawks	18	46	77	123	148	12	6.83	8.22	0.67	1	2	4	6	6	0	6.00	6.00	0.00
2026	Rochester Knighthawks	18	41	78	119	135	12	6.61	7.50	0.67	–	–	–	–	–	–	–	–	–
		103	247	343	590	762	50	5.73	7.40	0.49	10	12	20	32	54	0	3.20	5.40	0.00
Career Total:		113	259	363	622	816	50	5.50	7.22	0.44									

GP–Games played; G–Goals; A–Assists; Pts–Points; LB–Loose balls; PIM–Penalty minutes; Pts/GP–Points per games played; LB/GP–Loose balls per games played; PIM/GP–Penalty minutes per games played.

== PLL Statistics ==
Season	Team	Regular season											Playoffs										
Season	Team	GP	G	2PG	A	Pts	Sh	GB	Pen	PIM	FOW	FOA	GP	G	2PG	A	Pts	Sh	GB	Pen	PIM	FOW	FOA
2019	Chaos	10	22	0	11	33	61	15	0	0	0	0	2	2	0	1	3	8	3	0	0	0	0
2020	Chaos	6	6	0	1	7	19	5	0	0	0	0	–	–	–	–	–	–	–	–	–	–	–
2021	Archers	9	13	1	8	22	40	10	1	0.5	0	0	1	2	0	1	3	7	4	0	0	0	0
2022	Archers	6	12	0	4	16	32	5	0	0	0	0	2	3	0	3	6	10	8	0	0	0	0
2023	Archers	10	28	0	11	39	94	15	0	0	0	0	1	2	0	0	2	4	2	0	0	0	0
2024	Archers	10	25	0	7	32	71	12	0	0	0	0	2	1	0	1	2	8	4	0	0	0	0
2025	Archers	10	14	0	6	20	47	15	1	0.5	0	0	–	–	–	–	–	–	–	–	–	–	–
		61	120	1	48	169	364	77	2	1	0	0	8	10	0	6	16	29	21	0	0	0	0
Career total:		69	130	1	54	185	393	98	2	1	0	0											

GP–Games played; G–Goals; 2PG–2-point goals; A–Assists; Pts–Points; Sh–Shots; GB–Ground balls; Pen–Penalties; PIM–Penalty minutes; FOW–Faceoffs won; FOA–Faceoffs attempted

== Personal life ==
Fields is the son of Jennifer and Peter Fields and has a brother named Peter. He has dual citizenship with the United States and Canada. He was on Canada's tryout roster for the 2018 World Lacrosse Championship. However, for the 2019 World Indoor Lacrosse Championship, Fields tried out for Team USA. He represented Canada at the 2023 World Lacrosse Championship.

== Awards and achievements ==
Preceded by Josh Byrne	NLL Most Valuable Player; 2025	Succeeded by incumbent

== See also ==
- 2018 NCAA Division I Men's Lacrosse Championship
