= Connor Fields =

Connor Fields may refer to:

- Connor Fields (BMX rider)
- Connor Fields (lacrosse)
