= Long Island Cup =

Multi-team lacrosse tournament

Tournament information
- Sport: Lacrosse
- Location: Long Island
- Month played: February
- Established: 2022
- Teams: 4

Current champion
- Stony Brook University

The Long Island Cup is a multi-team lacrosse tournament among the four Division I college lacrosse programs located on Long Island, New York. It consists of Hofstra University and Long Island University in Nassau County, Stony Brook University in Suffolk County and St. John's University in Queens County, which is part of the geographical definition of Long Island but not the cultural one. Stony Brook is the only public school involved in the tournament.

The first edition of the tournament was held in 2022 at Hofstra's James M. Shuart Stadium and was won by Stony Brook. The winner of the tournament is said to be the champions of Long Island lacrosse, earning bragging rights over its regional rivals. The tournament has been compared to the Beanpot, an annual ice hockey tournament involving the same group of four Boston schools since 1952.

== Format ==
The four teams that participate in the Long Island Cup are:

- Hofstra Pride
- LIU Sharks
- St. John's Red Storm
- Stony Brook Seawolves

== History ==
St. John's head coach Chris Miller brought up the concept of a midseason Long Island lacrosse tournament to Hofstra's head coach Seth Tierney. Soon after, LIU's head coach Eric Wolf and Stony Brook's head coach Anthony Gilardi were added to the text chat planning the tournament. The tournament appealed to the program's coaches because of the ability to promote the sport of lacrosse on Long Island through high school student attendance, media coverage and rotating host schools. However, there were concerns about how tournament would restrict the number of local teams that each school could play, and concerns about the future uncertainty caused by the 2021–22 NCAA conference realignment with Stony Brook joining Hofstra in the Colonial Athletic Association beginning in 2023.

In the inaugural 2022 Long Island Cup, LIU beat Hofstra 14–11 in the semifinals; it was LIU's first win over Hofstra since 1987, when LIU was known as C.W. Post. Stony Brook beat St. John's 17–10 in the other semifinal. Stony Brook won the first-ever Long Island Cup by beating LIU 10–6 in the championship game.

== All-time results ==
Edition	Year	Arena	Date	Attend.	First Game	Second Game	Date	Attend.	Consolation	Final
1st	2022	James M. Shuart Stadium	Fri, Feb 25	885	LIU 14; Hofstra 11	Stony Brook 17; St. John's 10	Sun, Feb 27	742	Hofstra 12; St. John's 6	Stony Brook 10 (1, 1–0); LIU 6 (1, 0–1)

== Team statistics ==
Team	W	L	T	Pct.	GF	GA	Long Island Cup Finishes				Championship Games		
Team	W	L	T	Pct.	GF	GA	1st	2nd	3rd	4th	Total	Goals	Avg.
Stony Brook	2	0	0	1.000	27	16	1	0	0	0	1	10	10.00
LIU	1	1	0	.500	20	21	0	1	0	0	1	6	6.00
Hofstra	1	1	0	.500	23	20	0	0	1	0	0	0	0.00
St. John's	0	2	0	.000	16	29	0	0	0	1	0	0	0.00

== See also ==
- College rivalry
- Hofstra Pride
- LIU Sharks
- St. John's Red Storm
- Stony Brook Seawolves
