= Jordan Levine =

American lacrosse player

Personal information
- Nationality: American
- Born: June 30, 1986 (age 39)
- Height: 5 ft 8 in (173 cm)
- Weight: 180 lb (82 kg; 12 st 12 lb)

Sport
- Position: midfielder
- NLL draft: 47th overall, 2008; Philadelphia Wings
- NLL team: Philadelphia Wings
- MLL team Former teams: Washington Bayhawks; New Jersey Pride; Toronto Nationals
- Former NCAA team: University at Albany
- Pro career: 2008–

Jordan Levine (born June 30, 1986) is a midfielder lacrosse player for the Washington Bayhawks.

== Early life ==
Levine, who is 5 feet, 8 inches tall, played baseball, basketball, and football at school. He started playing lacrosse when he was 13. As a high school senior he was captain of his Bethpage High School team, and was named All-Nassau County in football and basketball (where he played point guard).

== College ==
As a freshman season at University of Albany, where he majored in History, he was All-America East Conference (AAEC) and All-Rookie Team in lacrosse. He was named to the 2006 AAEC First Team, and in 2007 he set the Albany’s single-season NCAA Division I record with 91 GBs, and was AAEC Championship Team and First Team. He was named to the Jewish Sports Review College All-America team in 2007 and 2008, and in 2008 was also named AAEC First Team. Levine was named to the United States Intercollegiate Lacrosse Association (USILA) All-American Second Team in his junior year, and received an Honorable Mention the following year.

Dartmouth's head coach Bill Wilson said in September 2007:

The biggest X-factor for Albany is Jordan Levine.... He's willing to go to the goal at any time. He's willing to push the tempo any time, and if you let him take his right hand down the alley, he can shoot on the run as well as most guys.... he sneaks up on you, and he's the fastest guy we saw all year.

Albany head coach Scott Marr called him "an outstanding athlete". In February 2008, Quint Kessenich of ESPN wrote: "Jordan Levine is legit".

His career totals were 57 goals, 56 assists (eighth on Albany's all-time list), and 321 ground balls.

== Pro career ==
He was selected by the New Jersey Pride as the 10th pick in the first round of the 2008 MLL Collegiate Player draft. As a rookie, he had 14 points on 5 goals and 9 assists for Toronto.

He played for the Toronto Nationals as they won the Major League Lacrosse (MLL) championship in 2009.

In February 2010 he was traded from Toronto to the Washington Bayhawks along with attackman Jeff Zywicki and defenseman Nick O’Hara for Kevin Huntley, midfielder Josh Sims, and two draft picks. Washington General Manager Spencer Ford said: "Jordan Levine is an unbelievable transition midfielder who can play D, run between the lines and score. He will help us in a big way."
