= 1979 NCAA Division II lacrosse tournament =

1979 NCAA Division II Lacrosse Championship
Tournament information
- Sport: College lacrosse
- Location: (New York (state)) Garden City, New York (final)
- Host(s): Adelphi University (final)
- Venue(s): Motamed Field (final)
- Participants: 12

Final positions
- Champions: Adelphi (1st title)
- Runner-up: UMBC (1st title game)

Tournament statistics
- Matches played: 11
- Goals scored: 274 (24.91 per match)
- Attendance: 7,754 (705 per match)
- Top scorer(s): Bob Engelke, AU (22); Jay Robertson, UMBC (22)

The 1979 NCAA Division II Lacrosse Championship was the sixth annual single-elimination tournament to determine the national champions of NCAA Division II and Division III men's college lacrosse in the United States.

This was the final championship before the introduction of a separate Division III men's championship in 1980. As such, this was the final year of the tournament's twelve-team format.

The final was played at Motamed Field at Adelphi University in Garden City, New York.

Adelphi defeated UMBC in the final, 17–12, to win their first national title. The Panthers (13–3) were coached by Paul Doherty.

This was the first Division II championship game without Hobart, who lost to St. Lawrence in the quarterfinals. The defending champions, Roanoke, also fell in the quarterfinal round.

== Bracket ==
First Round
Salisbury State	13
Loyola (MD)	12
UMBC	22
Babson	7
Cortland	11
Ithaca	9
St. Lawrence	14
Ohio Wesleyan	12

Quarterfinals
Towson State	17
Salisbury State	4
Roanoke	8
UMBC	13
Adelphi	14
Cortland	9
Hobart	11
St. Lawrence	12

Semifinals
Towson State	12
UMBC	16
Adelphi	16
St. Lawrence	13

Championship
UMBC	12
Adelphi	17

== See also ==
- 1979 NCAA Division I Lacrosse Championship
