= John Fallon Field =

Sports field in Albany, New York

Coordinates: 42.681722°N 73.825829°W

- Interactive map of John Fallon Field
- Location: University at Albany, Albany, New York
- Owner: University at Albany
- Capacity: 2,500
- Surface: FieldTurf

Construction
- Opened: 2005

Tenants
- UAlbany Men's Lacrosse (2005-pres.); UAlbany Women's Lacrosse (2005-pres.)

John Fallon Field is a 2,500-seat multi-purpose field in Albany, New York. It is home to the University at Albany ("UAlbany") Men's and Women's Great Danes lacrosse teams. The field opened in 2005, as UAlbany's lacrosse program has grown into one of the National power-house teams in Division I lacrosse. The current bleachers opened prior to the 2008–09 school year as temporary bleachers were used the previous seasons.

John Fallon Field is located east of the Physical Education building. The field has hosted the 2002, 2003, 2007, and 2015 America East Conference men's lacrosse championship in which the Great Danes earned three of their 13 NCAA Men's Lacrosse Championship bids (as of 2026). It also the venue for the women's lacrosse team, who has hosted the tournament at neighboring Bob Ford Field. John Fallon Field has also hosted the Gary Gait coached Syracuse Orange women's lacrosse team in 2008.

On June 12, 2010 hosted the Chicago Machine the Long Island Lizards there in a Major League Lacrosse game.

Due to growing popularity of lacrosse in the Capital Region, the first-ever men's lacrosse game was held at Bob Ford Field on April 18, 2015. It was the first time since March 10, 2007 that a top-10 matchup was held in the Capital District, with #4 UAlbany defeating #10 Delaware 13-7.
