= Frank Resetarits =

American lacrosse player

Personal information
- Nationality: American
- Born: Hamburg, New York, U.S.
- Height: 6 ft 2 in (188 cm)
- Weight: 210 lb (95 kg; 15 st 0 lb)

Sport
- Position: Attack
- NLL draft: 5th overall, 2007; San Jose Stealth
- NLL team Former teams: Buffalo Bandits; San Jose Stealth
- MLL team: Long Island Lizards
- NCAA team: University at Albany
- Pro career: 2008–

Career highlights
- 20th in NCAA Division I career goals; 2nd in career point at University of Albany

Frank Resetarits is a lacrosse player from Hamburg, New York. As a high school player Resitarits ranks in the top three players all-time for points in a career. He played forward for the Buffalo Bandits of the National Lacrosse League and attack for the Long Island Lizards of Major League Lacrosse. He was drafted fifth overall in the 2007 NLL entry draft by the San Jose Stealth.

In 2012, he served as an assistant lacrosse coach at Notre Dame de Namur University in Belmont, California.

In 2014, he began his MCLA coaching career at Pacific University in Stockton, California, as part of the WCLL.

In 2016, he would start coaching for the MCLA program at UC Davis, where he still coaches today. In 2018, he also joined the aggies's NCAA D1 women's lacrosse program as an assistant coach. He also works as the Sacramento ACES director, a youth, club lacrosse program in the Sacramento, California, area.

In 2023, he was inducted into the University at Albany Athletics Hall of Fame as part of their 2023 class.

== Junior career ==
Resetarits played junior box lacrosse for the St. Catharines Athletics, a team in Canada that was only an hour away from his hometown across the border. He played there from 2002 to 2006.

== College career ==
Resetarits also played collegiate lacrosse at the University at Albany. He was co-captain of the Great Danes, alongside Merrick Thomson, and helped lead his team to the NCAA Men's Lacrosse Championship tournament as a senior.

Resetarits was selected, as one of the five finalist for the 2007 Tewaaraton Trophy, awarded to the awarded "Most Outstanding" collegiate lacrosse player in the United States.

== Coaching career ==
Resetarits began his coaching career at Eden High School in Eden, New York, as an assistant coach in 2010. At the same time, he would co-found Champion Lacrosse, a top lacrosse club on the East Coast.

In 2012, he would take his coaching talents to California, starting with a stint as an assistant coach for Notre Dame de Namur University. He would follow it up with a head coaching position at Pacific University for their MCLA D2 program.

In 2016, Resetarits would take on the head coaching position for UC Davis's MCLA program. There he would transition them from D1 to D2 and saw instant success, boasting a 10–4 record, a major improvement on the team's 2–8 record from the previous season in D1, and advancing to the WCLL D2 conference finals. For this, he would receive his first of three Coach of the Year awards for the WCLL D2. In 2018, he would lead the aggies to their first MCLA tournament appearance, followed up by their first conference championship and another tournament appearance in 2019. The aggies would see continued success, winning two more consecutive conference championships in 2022 and 2023 (The 2020 and 2021 seasons were suspended due to the COVID-19 pandemic).

In 2018, he would join the UC Davis D1 women's lacrosse team as an assistant coach, where he mainly focuses on helping them with the attacking side of the field.

== Awards ==
- 2007—Nike/Inside Lacrosse player of the week honors
- 2007—USILA 1st Team All-American
- 2016—WCLL D2 Coach of the Year
- 2018—WCLL D2 Coach of the Year
- 2023—WCLL D2 Coach of the Year

== Career statistics ==
=== University at Albany ===
Season	GP	G	A	Pts	GB
2004	16	27	20	47	10
2005	16	29	21	50	17
2006	15	45	19	64	13
2007	18	57	23	80	25
Totals	65	158^{[a]}	83	241	65

^{[a]} 20th in NCAA Division I career goals

=== Major League Lacrosse ===
		Regular Season							Playoffs
Season	Team	GP	G	2ptG	A	Pts	GB	PIM	GP	G	2ptG	A	Pts	GB	PIM
2007	Long Island	7	12	0	6	18	8	1	-	-	-	-	-	-	-
2008	Long Island	11	23	0	0	23	14	.5	-	-	-	-	-	-	-
2009	Long Island	1	0	0	0	0	0	0	0	0	0	0	0	0	0
MLL Totals		19	35	0	6	41	22	1.5	0	0	0	0	0	0	0

=== National Lacrosse League ===
		Regular Season						Playoffs
Season	Team	GP	G	A	Pts	LB	PIM	GP	G	A	Pts	LB	PIM
2008	San Jose	13	17	17	34	27	7	1	2	2	4	2	0
2009	San Jose	8	7	9	16	21	6	2	4	2	6	0	0
NLL totals		21	24	26	50	48	13	3	6	4	10	2	0

== See also ==
- Albany Great Danes men's lacrosse
