= 2016 NCAA Division I men's lacrosse tournament =

- Teams: 18
- Finals site: Lincoln Financial Field, Philadelphia, PA
- Champions: North Carolina (5th title)
- Runner-up: Maryland (13th title game)
- Semifinalists: Loyola (4th Final Four); Brown (2nd Final Four)
- Winning coach: Joe Breschi (1st title)
- MOP: Chris Cloutier, UNC
- Attendance: 33,137 semi-finals 26,749 finals 59,886 total
- Top scorer: Chris Cloutier, UNC (19 goals)

The 2016 NCAA Division I Men's Lacrosse Championship was the 46th annual single-elimination tournament to determine the national championship for National Collegiate Athletic Association (NCAA) Division I men's college lacrosse. Eighteen teams competed in the tournament, chosen by either winning an automatic qualifying conference tournament or as an at-large bid based on their performance during the regular season. The participating teams were announced on May 8.

North Carolina won the title, defeating Maryland 14–13 in overtime in the final, becoming the first unseeded team to win the championship. Chris Cloutier had 19 goals and 3 assists in the tournament, including 9 goals against Loyola in the semifinals. The 19 goals is a tournament record.

== Tournament overview ==
The play-in games were played at campus sites on May 11, while the first round games were played at campus sites on May 14 and 15. The quarterfinal games were played on May 21, 2016 at Brown Stadium in Providence, Rhode Island, and May 22, 2016 at Ohio Stadium in Columbus, Ohio.

The semifinals were contested on May 28, 2016, and the championship on May 30, 2016. The semifinals and championship were held at Lincoln Financial Field in Philadelphia, and hosted by Drexel University.

Schools from 10 conferences, the America East Conference, Atlantic Coast Conference (ACC), Big East Conference, Colonial Athletic Association (CAA), Big Ten Conference, Ivy League, Metro Atlantic Athletic Conference (MAAC), Northeast Conference (NEC), Patriot League, and Southern Conference (SoCon) received automatic bids into the tournament by winning their respective conference tournaments, leaving eight remaining at-large bids for top ranked teams. The top fourteen seeds were placed directly into the bracket, and the four lowest seeds met in play-in games to the Sweet 16.

In the finals, Maryland was ahead by two goals with over seven minutes to play before Carolina tied the game. A potential game winning goal by Colin Heacock of Maryland went off the crossbar with just over a minute left in regulation. The game went into overtime where Kyle Bernlohr made a miracle save for Maryland, but the Terps were called for a one minute penalty on the play. On the man up, Michael Tagliaferri found Chris Cloutier uncovered at the top of the key, and he beat Bernlohr low for the winning goal. This was North Carolina's fifth national title.

== Teams ==
Seed	School	Conference	Berth Type	RPI	Record
1	Maryland	Big Ten	Automatic	1	14–2
2	Denver	Big East	At-large	3	13–2
3	Notre Dame	ACC	At-large	2	10-3
4	Yale	Ivy	Automatic	4	13–2
5	Brown	Ivy	At-large	5	14–2
6	Marquette	Big East	Automatic	6	11–4
7	Loyola	Patriot	Automatic	7	12–3
8	Syracuse	ACC	Automatic	10	11–4
	Albany	America East	At-large	8	12–3
	Duke	ACC	At-large	9	11–7
	Johns Hopkins	Big Ten	At-large	11	8–6
	Towson	CAA	Automatic	12	14–2
	Air Force	Southern	Automatic	13	15–2
	Navy	Patriot	At-large	14	10–4
	North Carolina	ACC	At-large	17	8–6
	Quinnipiac	MAAC	Automatic	24	11–3
	Hartford	America East	Automatic	30	11–6
	Hobart	Northeast	Automatic	35	10–6

== Bracket ==
Play-in game May 11
Quinnipiac	14
Hartford	9

Play-in game May 11
Towson	18
Hobart	5

First Round; May 14–15
1	Maryland	13
Quinnipiac	6
8	Syracuse	11
Albany	9
4	Yale	10
Navy	13
5	Brown	17
Johns Hopkins	8
3	Notre Dame	15
Air Force	7
6	Marquette	9
North Carolina	10
7	Loyola	16
Duke	11
2	Denver	9
Towson	10

Quarterfinals; May 21–22; Brown Stadium; Ohio Stadium
1	Maryland	13
8	Syracuse	7
Navy	10
5	Brown	11
3	Notre Dame	9
North Carolina	13
7	Loyola	10
Towson	8

Semifinals; May 28; Lincoln Financial Field
1	Maryland	15*
5	Brown	14
North Carolina	18
7	Loyola	13

Final; May 30; Lincoln Financial Field
1	Maryland	13
North Carolina	14*

* = Overtime

== Tournament boxscores ==
Tournament Finals

Team	1	2	3	4	OT	Total
North Carolina	6	1	3	3	1	14
Maryland	5	3	2	3	0	13
North Carolina scoring – Chris Cloutier 5, Luke Goldstock 4, Steve Pontrello 2, Brian Cannon 2, Patrick Kelly 1.; Maryland scoring – Connor Kelly 4, Matt Rambo 3, Henry West 2, Colin Heacock 2, Dylan Maltz 2; Shots: Maryland 38, North Carolina 32; Saves: North Carolina 13, Maryland 9

Tournament Semi-Finals

Team	1	2	3	4	Total
North Carolina	9	5	2	2	18
Loyola	2	3	3	5	13
North Carolina scoring – Chris Cloutier 9, Steve Pontrello 2, Luke Goldstock 2, Timmy Kelly 2, Patrick Kelly, Brian Cannon, William McBride; Loyola scoring – Tyler Albrecht 3, Zach Herreweyers 3, Brian Sherlock 2, Romar Dennis 2, Pat Spencer, Nick Mazza, John Duffy; Shots: North Carolina 39, Loyola 39

Team	1	2	3	4	OT	Total
Maryland	5	4	3	2	1	15
Brown	5	3	1	5	0	14
Maryland scoring – Colin Heacock 3, Dylan Maltz 3, Henry West 2, Tim Rotanz 2, Matt Rambo, Connor Kelly, Louis Dubick, Isaiah Davis-Allen, Matt Dunn; Brown scoring – Bailey Tills 4, Henry Blynn 2,Brendan Caputo 2, Dylan Molloy 2, Matt Graham, Kylor Bellistri, Will Gural, Larken Kemp; Shots: Maryland 40, Brown 35; Shots: Maryland 40, Brown 35

Tournament Quarterfinals

Team	1	2	3	4	Total
Maryland	2	7	4	3	13
Syracuse	1	3	1	6	7
Maryland scoring – Eric Fannell 5, Jack Jasinski 2, Johnny Pearson 2, JT Blubaugh 2, Lukas Buckley 2, Tre Leclaire, Freddy Freibott, Austin Shanks; Syracuse scoring – Jack Bruckner 3, Justin Guterding 2, Sean Cerrone, Brad Smith, Mitch Russell, Sean Lowrie, Joey Manown, John Prendergast; Shots: Duke 45, Ohio State 31

Team	1	2	3	4	Total
Brown	2	6	5	3	11
Navy	1	0	1	2	10
Denver scoring – Austin French 4, Tyler Pace 3, Ethan Walker 3, Connor Cannizzaro 2, Trevor Baptiste, Colton Jackson, Colin Rutan, Nate Marano; Notre Dame scoring – Mikey Wynne 3, Sergio Perkovic; Shots: Denver 39, Notre Dame 16

Team	1	2	3	4	Total
North Carolina	3	3	5	2	13
Notre Dame	2	0	1	6	9
North Carolina scoring – Steve Pontrello 4, Chris Cloutier 3, Luke Goldstock 2, Michael Tagliaferri 2, Timmy Kelly, Patrick Kelly; Notre Dame scoring – Mikey Wynne 4, Matt Kavanagh 2, Ryder Garnsey, Drew Schantz, Brendan Collins; Shots: Notre Dame 43, North Carolina 34

Team	1	2	3	4	Total
Loyola	6	2	1	1	10
Towson	0	2	1	4	8
Loyola scoring – Pat Spencer 3, Zack Sirico 3, Romar Dennis, Jay Drapeau, Tyler Albrecht, Zach Herreweyers; Towson scoring – Spencer Parks 2, Ben McCarty 2, Ryan Drenner 2, Zach Goodrich, Mike Lynch; Shots: Loyola 36, Towson 25; Saves: Towson 8, Loyola 5

Tournament First Round

Team	1	2	3	4	Total
Maryland	2	1	3	1	13
Quinnipiac	0	2	2	0	6
Ohio State scoring – Tre Leclaire 3, Eric Fannell, Jack Jasinski, Colin Chell, Austin Shanks; Loyola scoring – Romar Dennis, Pat Spencer, Zack Sirico, Jared Mintzlaff; Shots: Loyola 44, Ohio State 22

Team	1	2	3	4	Total
Denver	3	3	7	4	17
Air Force	2	1	4	3	10
Denver scoring – Austin French 3, Max Planning 3, Connor Cannizzaro 3, Trevor Baptiste 2, Connor Donahue 2, Ethan Walker 2, Colton Jackson, Jeremy Bosher; Air Force scoring – Grant Gould 3, Matthew Schwartz 2, Chet Dunstan 2, Austin Smith, Trent Harper, Cameron Carter; Shots: Denver 43, Air Force 35

Team	1	2	3	4	Total
Duke	4	6	3	3	16
High Point	1	4	2	3	10
Duke scoring – Michael Sowers 4, Sean Lowrie 3, Owen Caputo 2, Brennan O'Neill 2, Garrett Leadmon, Nakeie Montgomery, JPBasile, Dyson Williams, Jake Naso; High Point scoring – Jack Vanoverbeke 2, Brayden Mayea 2, Kevin Rogers 2, Koby Russell, Asher Nolting, Tyler Stinson, Colin Clothier; Shots: Duke 43, High Point 34

Team	1	2	3	4	Total
Towson	1	2	4	5	12
Penn State	1	3	1	3	8
Towson scoring – Joe Seider 4, Ryan Drenner 2, Mike Lynch 2, Tyler Konen, Tyler Young, Alex Woodall, Dylan Kinnear; Penn State scoring – Grant Ament 3, Mac O'Keefe 3, Nick Aponte 2; Shots: Towson 43, Penn State 23; Saves: Towson 43, Penn State 23

Team	1	2	3	4	Total
Syracuse	3	1	5	2	11
Yale	3	3	2	2	10
Syracuse scoring – Jamie Trimboli 2, Nick Mariano 2, Brad Voigt, Nate Solomon, Ryan Simmons, Jordan Evans, Stephen Rehfuss, Brendan Bomberry, Sergio Salcido; Yale scoring – Ben Reeves 4, Lucas Cotler 2, Matt Gaudet 2, Joseph Sessa, Jackson Morrill; Shots: Yale 42, Syracuse 29

Team	1	2	3	4	Total
North Carolina	2	4	3	1	10
Marquette	3	2	2	2	9
North Carolina scoring – Michael Tagliaferri 3, Steve Pontrello 2, Chris Cloutier 2, Shane Simpson, Brian Cannon, Timmy Kelly; Marquette scoring – Tanner Thomson 3, Ryan McNamara 2, Blaine Fleming 2, Kyran Clarke, Andy DeMichiei; Shots: North Carolina 37, Marquette 26; Saves: North Carolina 37, Marquette 26

Team	1	2	3	4	Total
Albany	7	7	0	1	15
North Carolina	2	1	6	3	12
Albany scoring – Bennett Drake 5, Adam Osika 3, Kyle McClancy 3, Connor Fields, Sean Eccles, Mitch Laffin, Eli Lasda; North Carolina scoring – Chris Cloutier 5, Luke Goldstock 2, Jack Rowlett 2, Timmy Kelly, Justin Anderson, William McBride; Shots: Albany 46, North Carolina 43

Team	1	2	3	4	Total
Towson	2	3	2	3	10
Denver	1	2	2	4	9
Towson scoring – Parks, Spencer (4); Seider, Joe (2); Lynch, Mike (2); Drenner, Ryan (1); Mazza, Jon (1); Denver scoring – MILLER, Zach (3); JACKSON, Colton (2); CANNIZZARO, Connor (2); PACE, Tyler (1); DONAHUE, Connor (1); Shots: Towson 35, Denver 35; Saves: Towson 13, Denver 7
