= Quinnipiac Bobcats men's lacrosse =

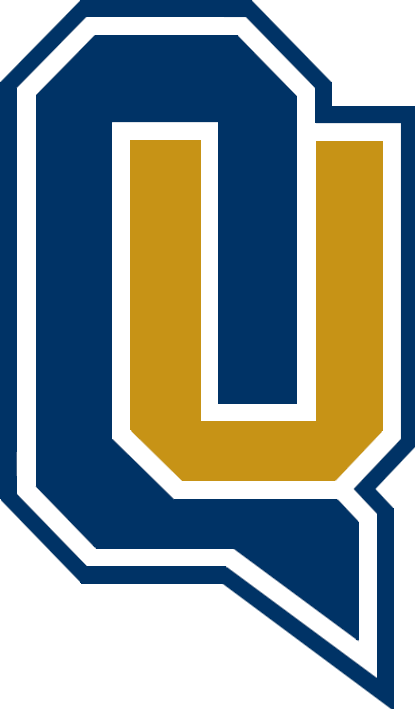
- Founded: 1991
- University: Quinnipiac University
- Head coach: Mason Poli
- Stadium: Quinnipiac Soccer & Lacrosse Stadium (capacity: 1,500)
- Location: Hamden, Connecticut
- Conference: Metro Atlantic Athletic Conference
- Nickname: Bobcats
- Colors: Navy and gold

NCAA Tournament appearances
- 2016

Conference Tournament championships
- 2016

Conference regular season championships
- 2016, 2018

The Quinnipiac Bobcats men's lacrosse team represents the Quinnipiac University in National Collegiate Athletic Association (NCAA) Division I college lacrosse. The program was created in 1991. Quinnipiac plays its home games at Quinnipiac Soccer and Lacrosse Field, which has a capacity of 1,500. The Bobcats currently compete in the Metro Atlantic Athletic Conference. Since 1991 the team has had an all-time record of 138–190 and reached the NCAA Division I tournament in 2016.

== Season results ==
Season	Conference	Season results			Head coach
Season	Conference	Conf. finish	W	L	Head coach
1991		—	2	7	Randy Aitken
1992		—	2	9	Randy Aitken
1993		—	4	6	Randy Aitken
1994	Northeast 10 Conference	—	2	9	Kevin Tyska
1995	Northeast 10 Conference	—	7	6	Anthony LoRicco
1996	Northeast 10 Conference	—	9	6	Anthony LoRicco
1997	Northeast 10 Conference	—	5	8	Anthony LoRicco
1998	Northeast 10 Conference	—	5	9	Tim Price
1999	Metro Atlantic Athletic Conference	6-2	8	7	Tim Price
2000	Metro Atlantic Athletic Conference	4-5	5	8	Tim Price
2001	Metro Atlantic Athletic Conference	8-0	14	2	Tim Price
2002	America East Conference	4th	6	7	Eric Fekete
2003	America East Conference	6th	3	10	Eric Fekete
2004	America East Conference	5th	2	11	Eric Fekete
2005	America East Conference	5th	2	11	Eric Fekete
2006	Great Western Lacrosse League	5th	7	6	Eric Fekete
2007	Great Western Lacrosse League	4th	6	7	Eric Fekete
2008	Great Western Lacrosse League	4th	8	5	Eric Fekete
2009	Great Western Lacrosse League	4th	4	9	Eric Fekete
2010	Eastern College Athletic Conference	4th	8	6	Eric Fekete
2011	Northeast Conference	2nd	7	7	Eric Fekete
2012	Northeast Conference	4th	3	11	Eric Fekete
2013	Northeast Conference	3rd	6	8	Eric Fekete
2014	Metro Atlantic Athletic Conference	3rd	6	8	Eric Fekete
2015	Metro Atlantic Athletic Conference	3rd	6	8	Eric Fekete
2016	Metro Atlantic Athletic Conference	1st	11	3	Eric Fekete
2017	Metro Atlantic Athletic Conference	6th	2	9	Eric Fekete
2018	Metro Atlantic Athletic Conference	1st	9	6	Eric Fekete
2019	Metro Atlantic Athletic Conference	T–2nd	9	7	Mason Poli
2020	Metro Atlantic Athletic Conference	—	0	6	Mason Poli
2021	Metro Atlantic Athletic Conference	T–2nd	4	3	Mason Poli
2022	Metro Atlantic Athletic Conference	T–6th	2	11	Mason Poli
2023	Metro Atlantic Athletic Conference	T–4th	7	7	Mason Poli
2024	Metro Atlantic Athletic Conference	T–4th	9	5	Mason Poli
2025	Metro Atlantic Athletic Conference	T–6th	3	12	Mason Poli
2026	Metro Atlantic Athletic Conference		1	6	Mason Poli

== Career coaching records ==
Head coach (years)	Record	Home	Road	Neutral
Randy Aitken (1991–1993)	8–22	7–10	1–12	0–0
Kevin Tyska (1994)	2–9	0–4	2–4	0–1
Anthony LoRicco (1995–1997)	21–20	11–9	10–11	0-0
Tim Price (1998–2001)	32–26	16–8	14–16	2–2
Erik Fekete (2002–2018)	96–132	46–48	39–72	4–7
Mason Poli (2019–Present)	29–34	14–8	14–25	1–1

== Individual career records ==
Goals

1. Mike Baglio (2002), 144

2. Joe Baglio (2002), 140

3. Alan LoGiudice (2001), 117

4. Ryan Keenan (2016), 94

5. Corey Pronsky (1997), 88

6. John “Gia” Giordano (2001), 21

Assists

1. Michael Sagl (2015), 99

2. Joe Baglio (2002), 63

3. John Giordano (2003), 52

4. Jeff Speed (2002), 49

5. Christian Haggerty (2011), 44

Points

1. Joe Baglio (2002), 207

2. Mike Baglio (2002), 187

3. Michael Sagl (2015), 183

4. Alan LoGiudice (2001), 159

5. Ryan Keenan (2016), 131

Saves

1. T.J. Barnett (2004), 628

2. Kevin Benzing (2011), 524

3. Mike Sturmer (1998), 425

4. Jason Boggs-True (1999), 369

5. Gill Conners (2014), 366

== Individual single-season records ==
Goals

1. Alan LoGiudice (2001), 50

2. Joe Baglio (2001), 49

3. Mike Baglio (2001), 46

4. Joe Baglio (1999), 41

5. Mike Baglio (2002), 40

Assists

1. Michael Sagl (2015), 31

2. Joe Baglio (2001), 29

3. Michael Sagl (2014), 26

4. Michael Sagl (2013), 25

4. Christian Haggerty (2010), 25

4. Brian Perry (1998), 25

Points

1. Joe Baglio (2001), 78

2. Alan LoGiudice (2001), 64

3. Mike Baglio (2001), 60

4. Brian Perry (1998), 58

5. Michael Sagl (2015), 56

Saves

1. Mike Sturmer (1999), 252

2. T.J. Barnett (2001), 205

3. Gill Conners (2013), 195

4. Mike Sturmer (1998), 173

5. Gill Conners (2014), 171

== Individual single-game records ==
Goals Scored Erik Anderson at Siena (4/10/99), 8

Assists John Giordano at Wagner (4/1/00), 7

Points Alan LoGuidice vs. Manhattan (4/27/99), 10

Saves Mike Sturmer vs. Gannon (3/6/99), 32

== Team single-season records ==
Goals Scored 170 (1998)

Goals Allowed 190 (1994)

Fewest Goals Scored 45 (1991)

Fewest Goals Allowed 94 (1991)

Wins 14 (2001)

Loses 11 (2004, 2005, 2012)

== Team single-game records ==
Goals Scored 27 at Wagner (4/1/00)

Goals Allowed 25 vs. Kean (4/12/94)

Fewest Goals Scored 1 vs. Bentley (3/25/97)

Fewest Goals Allowed 0 vs. New Haven (4/27/98)

Margin Of Victory (24–0) vs. New Haven (4/27/98)

Margin Of Defeat (23–2) at Queens (4/30/94)
