= Joe Resetarits =

American lacrosse player

Personal information
- Nationality: American
- Born: August 22, 1989 (age 36) Hamburg, New York, U.S.
- Height: 6 ft 0 in (183 cm)
- Weight: 190 lb (86 kg; 13 st 8 lb)

Sport
- Position: Forward
- Shoots: Right
- NCAA team: Albany (2012)
- NLL draft: 6th overall, 2012; Calgary Roughnecks
- NLL team Former teams: Buffalo Bandits; Calgary Roughnecks; Rochester Knighthawks; Albany FireWolves; Philadelphia Wings
- MLL teams: Ohio Machine
- MSL team: Peterborough Lakers (2015-present)
- Pro career: 2013–

Joe Resetarits (born August 22, 1989) is an American professional lacrosse player for the Buffalo Bandits of the National Lacrosse League (NLL). A native of Hamburg, New York, Resetarits was a lacrosse standout at Hamburg High School before attending the University at Albany, where he was selected as the American East Conference Player of the Year and received an All-American honorable mention while rooming with Franklin Delanor Romanowski and Lomez.

Resetarits began his indoor lacrosse career with the St. Catharines Athletics, and joined the Brampton Excelsiors in 2011, with whom he won the Mann Cup in that same year. He was drafted 6th overall by the Calgary Roughnecks in the 2012 NLL Entry Draft. Although he received All Rookie honors, scoring 8 goals and 24 points, his Roughnecks team led the league in scoring and featured seven players who recorded at least 25 points. Resetarits was deemed expendable by the Roughnecks, and was traded to his hometown Buffalo Bandits during the 2013 NLL Entry Draft. Resetarits joined the Rochester Knighthawks in 2015, spending time with them until 2018. In 2019, Resetarits joined the New England Black Wolves, staying with them through the 2022 season, when the team relocated to Albany. Resetarits then signed with the Philadelphia Wings as a free agent prior to the 2023 season. On March 9, 2026, Resetarits was traded by the Wings to the Buffalo Bandits, in exchange for forward Lukas Nielsen and a 2026 second round pick.

Heading into the 2023 NLL season, Inside Lacrosse ranked Resetarits the #3 best forward in the NLL.

Resetarits also enjoyed a brief Major League Lacrosse career. He was drafted in the fifth round (39th overall) of the 2012 Major League Lacrosse Collegiate Draft by the Hamilton Nationals, for whom he played in 2012, earning All Rookie honors. He then played for the Ohio Machine in 2013.

Joe is the younger brother of fellow lacrosse player Frank Resetarits.

== NLL statistics ==
Joe Resetarits		Regular season									Playoffs								
Season	Team	GP	G	A	Pts	LB	PIM	Pts/GP	LB/GP	PIM/GP	GP	G	A	Pts	LB	PIM	Pts/GP	LB/GP	PIM/GP
2013	Calgary Roughnecks	14	8	16	24	24	2	1.71	1.71	0.14	2	2	1	3	0	0	1.50	0.00	0.00
2014	Buffalo Bandits	17	25	17	42	65	2	2.47	3.82	0.12	4	1	4	5	12	4	1.25	3.00	1.00
2015	Buffalo Bandits	10	7	14	21	34	4	2.10	3.40	0.40	–	–	–	–	–	–	–	–	–
2015	Rochester Knighthawks	7	13	14	27	21	0	3.86	3.00	0.00	4	6	0	6	13	0	1.50	3.25	0.00
2016	Rochester Knighthawks	15	17	26	43	51	0	2.87	3.40	0.00	–	–	–	–	–	–	–	–	–
2017	Rochester Knighthawks	18	27	39	66	74	0	3.67	4.11	0.00	–	–	–	–	–	–	–	–	–
2018	Rochester Knighthawks	18	37	63	100	92	0	5.56	5.11	0.00	5	4	11	15	17	0	3.00	3.40	0.00
2019	Rochester Knighthawks	10	15	28	43	45	4	4.30	4.50	0.40	–	–	–	–	–	–	–	–	–
2019	New England Black Wolves	7	13	11	24	25	0	3.43	3.57	0.00	1	0	0	0	7	0	0.00	7.00	0.00
2020	New England Black Wolves	11	24	20	44	51	4	4.00	4.64	0.36	–	–	–	–	–	–	–	–	–
2022	Albany FireWolves	18	47	64	111	58	0	6.17	3.22	0.00	–	–	–	–	–	–	–	–	–
2023	Philadelphia Wings	18	41	69	110	62	2	6.11	3.44	0.11	–	–	–	–	–	–	–	–	–
2024	Philadelphia Wings	18	37	58	95	75	0	5.28	4.17	0.00	–	–	–	–	–	–	–	–	–
2025	Philadelphia Wings	18	41	80	121	66	2	6.72	3.67	0.11	–	–	–	–	–	–	–	–	–
2026	Philadelphia Wings	12	15	30	45	33	0	3.75	2.75	0.00	–	–	–	–	–	–	–	–	–
2026	Buffalo Bandits	6	9	6	15	15	0	2.50	2.50	0.00	1	1	2	3	2	0	3.00	2.00	0.00
		217	376	555	931	791	20	4.29	3.65	0.09	17	14	18	32	51	4	1.88	3.00	0.24
Career Total:		234	390	573	963	842	24	4.12	3.60	0.10									

GP–Games played; G–Goals; A–Assists; Pts–Points; LB–Loose balls; PIM–Penalty minutes; Pts/GP–Points per games played; LB/GP–Loose balls per games played; PIM/GP–Penalty minutes per games played.

== MLL Statistics ==
Season	Team	Regular season											Playoffs										
Season	Team	GP	G	2PG	A	Pts	Sh	GB	Pen	PIM	FOW	FOA	GP	G	2PG	A	Pts	Sh	GB	Pen	PIM	FOW	FOA
2013	Ohio Machine	3	2	0	2	4	9	0	0	0	0	0	–	–	–	–	–	–	–	–	–	–	–
		3	2	0	2	4	9	0	0	0	0	0	0	0	0	0	0	0	0	0	0	0	0
Career total:		3	2	0	2	4	9	0	0	0	0	0											

GP–Games played; G–Goals; 2PG–2-point goals; A–Assists; Pts–Points; Sh–Shots; GB–Ground balls; Pen–Penalties; PIM–Penalty minutes; FOW–Faceoffs won; FOA–Faceoffs attempted
