= UMass Lowell River Hawks men's lacrosse =

Lacrosse team at the University of Massachusetts Lowell

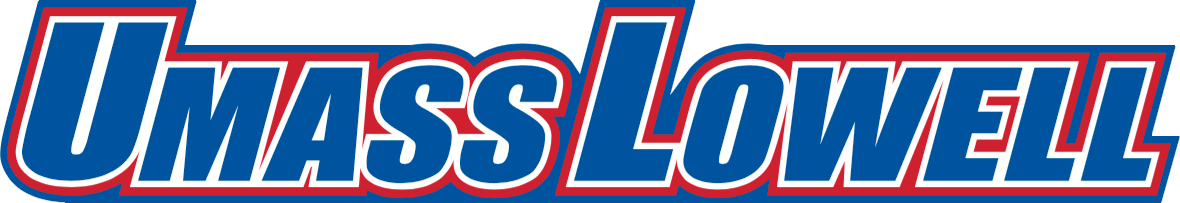
- University: University of Massachusetts Lowell
- Head coach: Drew Kelleher (since 2022 season)
- Stadium: Cushing Field Complex
- Location: Lowell, Massachusetts
- Conference: America East
- Nickname: River Hawks
- Colors: Blue, white, and red

The UMass Lowell men's lacrosse team is a college lacrosse team that represents the University of Massachusetts Lowell in Lowell, Massachusetts, United States. The school's teams are members of the America East Conference. Ed Stephenson was hired on August 1, 2013 to become the program's first head coach.

== The Ed Stephenson years ==
Ed Stephenson was hired as the first Men's lacrosse coach in UMass Lowell's history as a DI program in 2013. He led the River Hawks for eight seasons from 2015 through 2022, when he resigned. The Stephenson era at UMass Lowell was dominated by losing seasons as he led the River Hawks to an overall record of 28-77 and never had a winning season during his tenure.

2018 was the height of the Stephenson era as the River Hawks went 8-8 during their fourth season as a DI program and made the America East Tournament, where they fell to top-seeded UAlbany.

During the Stephenson era, UMass Lowell produced five Second-Team All-Conference selections and seven America East All-Rookie selections. In 2019, midfielder Dan Cozzi and faceoff man Liam McDonough became the first players in program history to be named First-Team All-Conference honorees.

== The Drew Kelleher years ==
Drew Kelleher was hired as the second head coach in UMass Lowell Men's lacrosse history on June 16, 2022.

== Year-by-year results ==
Season	Coach	Overall	Conference	Standing	Postseason
Ed Stephenson (America East Conference) (2015–2022)
2015	Ed Stephenson	1–13	0-6	7th	
2016	Ed Stephenson	4–12	0-6	7th	
2017	Ed Stephenson	4–12	1-5	7th	
2018	Ed Stephenson	8–8	3-3	4th	
2019	Ed Stephenson	5–9	2-4	7th	
2020	Ed Stephenson	3–4	0-0	†	†
2021	Ed Stephenson	1–8	1–7	7th	
2022	Ed Stephenson	2-11	2-4	6th	
Ed Stephenson:		28–77 (.267)	9–35 (.205)		
Drew Kelleher (America East Conference) (2023–Current)
2023	Drew Kelleher	0–13	0–7	8th	
2024	Drew Kelleher	0–12	0–7	8th	
2025	Drew Kelleher	4–8	1–4	7th	
2026	Drew Kelleher	2–5	0–0		
Drew Kelleher:		6–38 (.136)	1–18 (.053)		
Total:		34–115 (.228)			
National champion Postseason invitational champion Conference regular season champion Conference regular season and conference tournament champion Division regular season champion Division regular season and conference tournament champion Conference tournament champion

†NCAA canceled 2020 collegiate activities due to the COVID-19 virus.
