= St. John's Red Storm men's lacrosse =

American college lacrosse team

St. John’s Red Storm men's lacrosse
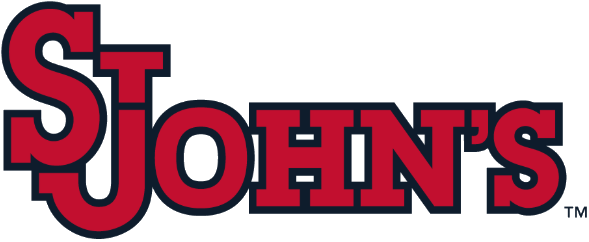
- Founded: 1981; 45 years ago
- University: St. John's University
- Head coach: Justin Turri (since 2023 season)
- Stadium: DaSilva Memorial Field (capacity: 1,200)
- Location: Queens, NY
- Conference: Big East Conference
- Nickname: Red Storm

The St. John’s University men's lacrosse team represents St. John's University in National Collegiate Athletic Association (NCAA) Division I college lacrosse. The program was created in 1981 and plays its home games at DaSilva Memorial Field, which has a capacity of 1,200. The Red Storm have competed in the Big East men's lacrosse conference since 2010, previously competing in the ECAC Lacrosse League. Through 2019, the team has an all–time record of 170-238.

In 2012, the Red Storm had arguably their best season since being revived as a program in 2005. St. John’s made its lone appearance to date in the Big East Conference men’s lacrosse tournament, defeating Notre Dame to reach the finals. The team faced Syracuse in the championship game, but were throttled 12-4 and denied their first ever NCAA Division I Men's Lacrosse Championship appearance.

== Season results ==
The following is a list of the Red Storm’s seasons results as an NCAA Division I program:

Season	Coach	Overall	Conference	Standing	Postseason
Bill Miltenberg (Independent) (1981–1995)
1981	Bill Miltenberg	8–4			
1982	Bill Miltenberg	8–3			
1983	Bill Miltenberg	8–4			
1984	Bill Miltenberg	5–7			
1985	Bill Miltenberg	6–5			
1986	Bill Miltenberg	7–7			
1987	Bill Miltenberg	6–8			
1988	Bill Miltenberg	8–7			
1989	Bill Miltenberg	6–8			
1990	Bill Miltenberg	8–6			
1991	Bill Miltenberg	4–11			
1992	Bill Miltenberg	10–5			
1993	Bill Miltenberg	5–10			
1994	Bill Miltenberg	6–9			
1995	Bill Miltenberg	8–6			
Bill Miltenberg:		103–99 (.510)			
Rick Sowell (ECAC Lacrosse League) (2005–2006)
2005	Rick Sowell	2–11	0–6	7th	
2006	Rick Sowell	4–9	0–7	8th	
Rick Sowell:		6–20 (.231)	0–13 (.000)		
Jason Miller (ECAC Lacrosse League) (2007–2009)
2007	Jason Miller	5–8	2–5		
2008	Jason Miller	2–11	2–5		
2009	Jason Miller	5–9	1–6	8th	
Jason Miller (Big East Conference) (2010–2022)
2010	Jason Miller	5–9	2–4	T–4th	
2011	Jason Miller	4–10	2–4	5th	
2012	Jason Miller	8–7	3–3	T–3rd	
2013	Jason Miller	9–4	3–3	T–4th	
2014	Jason Miller	7–7	3–3	T–3rd	
2015	Jason Miller	3–11	1–4	T–4th	
2016	Jason Miller	2–12	1–4	T–4th	
2017	Jason Miller	1–13	0–5	6th	
2018	Jason Miller	6–8	0–5	6th	
2019	Jason Miller	4–10	0–5	6th	
2020	Jason Miller	3–4	0–0	†	†
2021	Jason Miller	1–10	0–10	6th	
2022	Jason Miller	2–12	0–5	6th	
Jason Miller:		67–145 (.316)	20–71 (.263)		
Justin Turri (Big East Conference) (2023–Present)
2023	Justin Turri	0–14	0–5	6th	
2024	Justin Turri	4–11	1–4	5th	
2025	Justin Turri	4–11	0–5	6th	
2026	Justin Turri	2–6	0–0		
Justin Turri:		10–42 (.192)	1–14 (.067)		
Total:		186–306 (.378)			
National champion Postseason invitational champion Conference regular season champion Conference regular season and conference tournament champion Division regular season champion Division regular season and conference tournament champion Conference tournament champion

†NCAA canceled 2020 collegiate activities due to the COVID-19 virus.
