= Scott Marr =

American lacrosse coach

Current position
- Title: Head coach
- Team: Albany
- Conference: America East
- Record: 184–123

Biographical details
- Born: Yorktown, New York, U.S.

Playing career
- 1987–1990: Johns Hopkins
- Position: Attackman

Coaching career (HC unless noted)
- 1992–1994: Delaware (OC)
- 1995–2000: Maryland (OC)
- 2001–present: Albany

Head coaching record
- Overall: 184–123

Accomplishments and honors

Championships
- 2003 America East tournament 2004 America East tournament 2005 America East tournament 2007 America East tournament 2013 America East tournament

Awards
- 2002 America East Coach of the Year; 2007 USILA Coach of the Year; 2007 America East Coach of the Year; 2013 America East Coach of the Year

Scott Marr is an American lacrosse coach. He is currently the head coach for the University at Albany Great Danes men's lacrosse team. He previously served as the offensive coordinator at the University of Maryland and University of Delaware. Marr led the Great Danes to the school's first ever NCAA tournament appearance in 2003. In 2007, Albany won its first NCAA tournament game, and the United States Intercollegiate Lacrosse Association named Marr the Coach of the Year.

== College career ==
Marr was raised in Yorktown, New York, where he earned high school All-America honors in lacrosse. He attended college at Johns Hopkins University, from which he received a B.S. in behavioral science in 1991. Marr played lacrosse for the Blue Jays, and his career highlights included winning the NCAA championship in 1987 and advancing to the final in 1989.

== Coaching career ==
=== Assistant coach ===
Marr's first coaching experience was as an offensive coordinator at the University of Delaware from 1992 to 1994. The Blue Hens secured the North Atlantic Conference championship each year of his tenure there. Marr then served as an assistant coach and offensive coordinator under Dick Edell at the University of Maryland from 1995 to 2000. In that period, the Terrapins advanced to the NCAA tournament final in 1995, 1997, and 1998. The NCAA suspended Marr for two games for "unsportsmanlike behavior" directed at officiating staff during the 1998 championship game against Princeton.

=== University at Albany ===
Marr took over as head coach at the University at Albany for the 2001 season. In 2002, his Great Danes captured the America East Conference regular season championship, and Marr was voted as the conference Coach of the Year. The following year, Albany made its first appearance in the NCAA tournament. The Great Danes won the America East Conference tournament each season from 2003 to 2005, and with it earned an automatic berth in the NCAA tournament. After falling in the 2006 America East championship game, Albany returned to claim the conference title and an NCAA appearance in 2007. Fifth-seeded Albany then defeated Loyola in the first round for the first NCAA tournament win in school history. The Great Danes fell to Cornell in overtime in the NCAA quarterfinals, and Albany finished the season with a 15–3 record, the best in school history. Marr was named the 2007 USILA Coach of the Year.

Marr expressed an interest in the Maryland head coaching job after Dave Cottle was forced out in 2010: "I've always said it's a school that I would seriously consider if it did open up," but added, "I'm really excited about being at Albany ... I have no reason to move." The position, however, ultimately went to former Harvard head coach John Tillman.

=== International competition ===
In 2006, Marr served as an assistant coach for the United States national team, which secured the silver at the World Lacrosse Championship. Marr served as the assistant coach for the Iroquois nationals at the 2018 World Lacrosse Championship.

== Personal life ==
Marr has two children, Kyle and Jordyn, who played lacrosse at Shenendehowa High School. He also has a younger daughter Keeley who will be a senior at Shen this year. As of 2018 Kyle played college lacrosse for Johns Hopkins. Daughter Jordyn was a Captain for the women’s lacrosse team at UAlbany in 2019 and was an America East Scholar athlete. Scott's brother, Dave Marr, also played lacrosse at Johns Hopkins University.
