= Stony Brook Seawolves men's lacrosse =

Lacrosse team

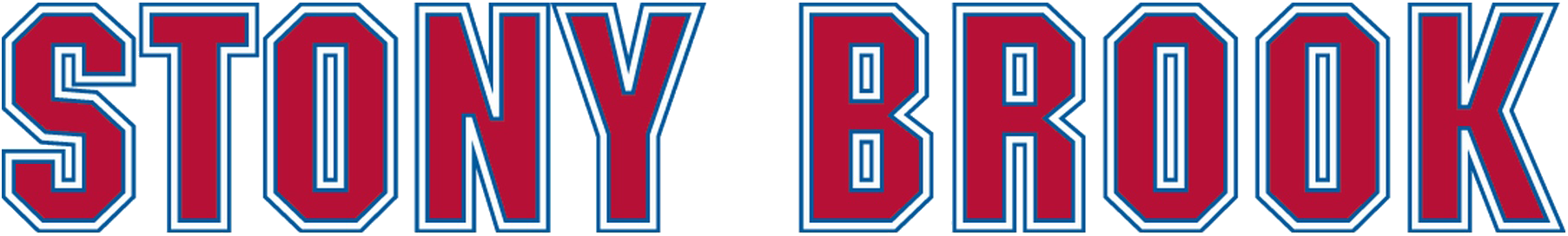
- Founded: 1983; 43 years ago
- University: Stony Brook University
- Head coach: Anthony Gilardi (4th season)
- Stadium: Kenneth P. LaValle Stadium (capacity: 12,300)
- Location: Stony Brook, New York
- Conference: Colonial Athletic Association
- Nickname: Seawolves
- Colors: Red, blue, and gray

NCAA Tournament Quarterfinals
- 2010

NCAA Tournament appearances
- 2002, 2010, 2012, 2026

Conference Tournament championships
- 2002, 2010, 2012, 2026

Conference regular season championships
- 2009, 2010, 2011, 2012, 2018, 2019

The Stony Brook Seawolves men's lacrosse team represents Stony Brook University in National Collegiate Athletic Association (NCAA) Division I men's college lacrosse. The Seawolves are led by Anthony Gilardi, who became the team's head coach prior to the 2020 season after eight seasons at Towson. Stony Brook currently competes in the Colonial Athletic Association and plays its home games on Kenneth P. LaValle Stadium.

Although a club team has existed since 1978, Stony Brook established a Division III program in 1983. Stony Brook entered Division I status in 1988. The team's most successful season came in 2010, when they were ranked in the top ten of the polls and appeared in their second NCAA Tournament, advancing to the quarterfinals and losing 10–9 to Virginia at home at the doorstep of a Final Four appearance. Overall, the team has won six regular-season titles in its former home of the America East Conference and appeared in three NCAA Tournaments.

== Team history ==
=== Pre-Division I era (1983–1988) ===
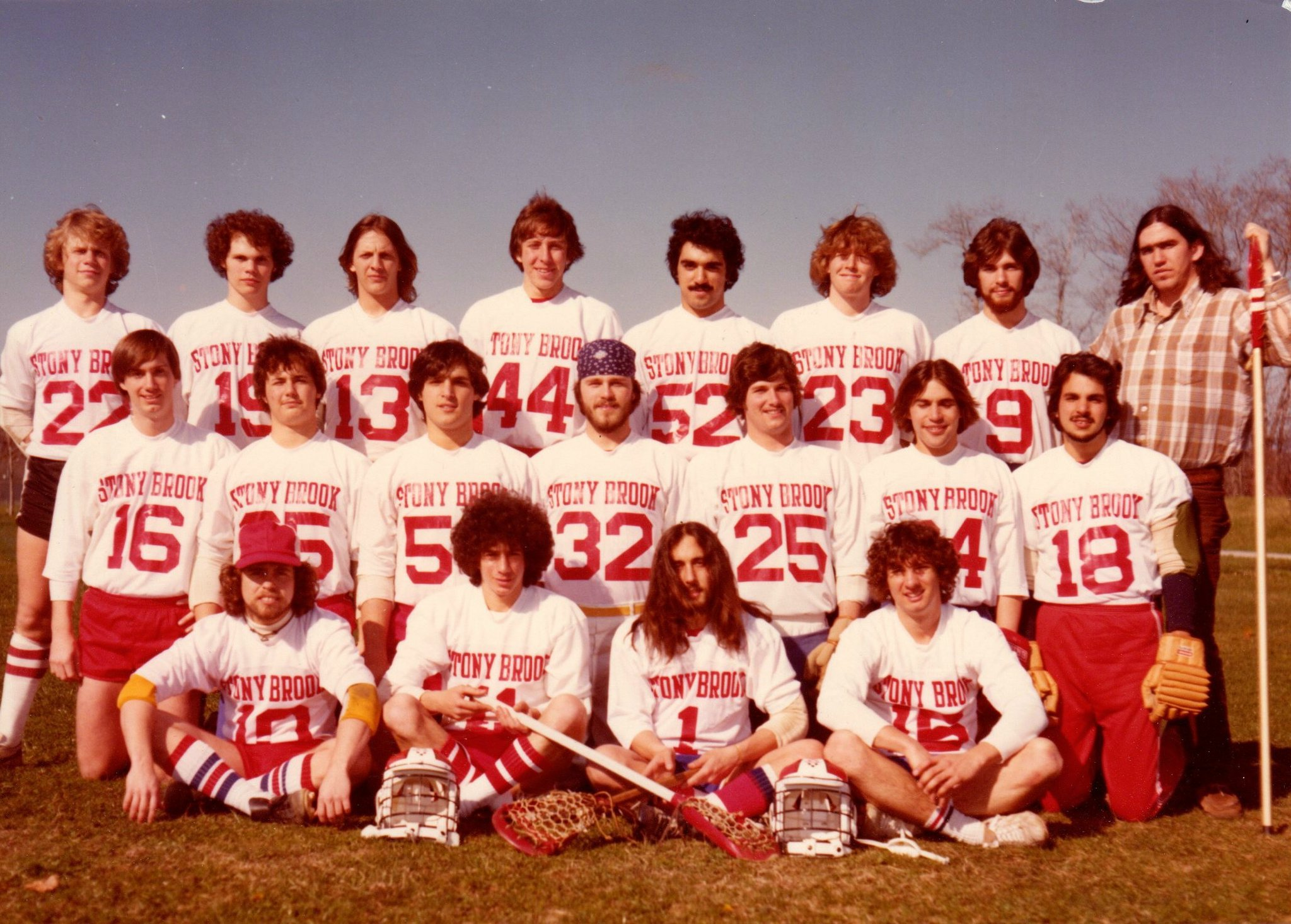
The Stony Brook club lacrosse team, 1978

Stony Brook University first fielded a men's lacrosse team in the 1983 season at the NCAA Division III level. Prior to that, a men's club lacrosse team had been started in 1978 by student Frank Ross. John Ziegler was the program's first head coach, going 30–10 over a span of three seasons. Before the 1986 season, Ziegler was replaced by Bruce Casagrande. Casagrande scheduled three Division I teams in 1986 and 1987, and Stony Brook defeated Ohio State 14–6 on March 21, 1987, at Huntington High School. Casagrande led the team during its transition from club status to official NCAA Division I program.

=== John Espey era (1988–2004) ===
Head coach John Espey took over for Casagrande beginning in 1988. Under Espey, Stony Brook expanded its facilities, recruiting efforts, and strength of schedule in order to build the program. By 1998, the program had achieved full funding status, allowing it to allocate the NCAA maximum of 12.6 scholarships for current athletes. In 2000, Stony Brook joined the ECAC Lacrosse League, but the Seawolves only played two seasons in the conference. Stony Brook joined the America East Conference and played its first season there in 2002.

In the Seawolves' inaugural America East season, the team was picked to finish first in the conference preseason poll. Stony Brook headed into the America East Tournament at 8–6, and beat Hartford and Albany to reach the first NCAA Tournament in program history. In the first round of the tournament, Cornell ran away with a 12–3 victory to end the Seawolves' season with a 10–7 record.

Espey resigned in 2004 after 16 seasons as head coach. In his final two years, Stony Brook was eliminated in the America East semifinals both times.

=== Lars Tiffany period (2005–2006) ===
On August 10, 2004, Penn State assistant head coach Lars Tiffany was named as Espey's successor. Tiffany spent two seasons as the Seawolves' head coach and did not return to the NCAA Tournament in either season, losing to Albany in the America East finals in 2005 and in the America East semifinals in 2006. Tiffany left in August 2006 to accept the head coaching job at his alma mater, Brown University, going 18–13 in his two seasons at Stony Brook.

=== Rick Sowell era (2007–2011) ===
St. John's head coach Rick Sowell was named Stony Brook's fifth head coach on August 15, 2006. In Sowell's debut, the Seawolves lost at home 15–7 to the #8 Virginia Cavaliers. However, Stony Brook eventually won five games in a row and found themselves ranked as high as #18 in the polls. The Seawolves tumbled out of the rankings after suffering four conference losses, and took the fourth seed in the conference tournament, being blown out 17–5 by Albany in the semifinals to end their season at 8–5.

In 2008, the Seawolves finished 7–7 and suffered another semifinal loss to Albany. The 2009 season saw Stony Brook come closest to returning to the NCAA Tournament since their 2002 appearance, but the Seawolves ended the season at 9–6 after losing to #11 UMBC in the America East Championship.

==== 2010 season: NCAA Tournament Quarterfinals ====
Stony Brook began the 2010 season unranked, beating Siena 21–14 in its season opener before losing the next game, 13–8 to #2 Virginia. The Seawolves then won three in a row, including a 16–12 victory over #16 Delaware, before losing the next two games 13–12 to Denver and 12–9 to #9 Cornell. With a 4–3 record, Stony Brook beat Bryant 8–7 before running the table in America East play, going undefeated including a 15–0 clobbering at Albany and a 16–10 win over Vermont. The Seawolves entered the America East Tournament at 10–3 having won six games in a row, and their winning streak became eight after defeating Vermont and Albany in the playoffs to reach the NCAA Tournament for the first time since 2002.

Stony Brook was ranked #6 in the country heading into the 2010 NCAA Division I Men's Lacrosse Championship. The Seawolves were given the #8 seed in the NCAA Tournament. In front of 4,262 fans at LaValle Stadium, Stony Brook defeated Denver 9–7 in the First Round to advance to the national quarterfinals, improving to 13–3 with a nine-game winning streak. In the quarterfinals, Stony Brook lost 10–9 to #1 Virginia, falling one goal shy of the program's first Final Four appearance. A record-setting 10,024 people attended the quarterfinal game at LaValle Stadium.

The Seawolves finished 2010 with a program-record 13 wins, going undefeated in America East play for the first time. Over a week after the loss to Virginia, Sowell's contract was extended through the 2015 season.

==== 2011 season ====
Stony Brook was ranked #5 in the USILA Coaches Poll heading into the season, and was unanimously picked to finish in first place in the America East.

The season opened with a top-5 battle at LaValle Stadium, with #5 Stony Brook hosting #1 Virginia. The Seawolves blew an early lead and lost 11–10 in overtime but recovered to win their next three games over Marist, Delaware, and St. John's. Stony Brook was then shocked on the road, falling 9–8 to unranked Towson before losing to #10 Cornell at home in a 17–9 blowout.

Sitting at 3–3, Stony Brook would go undefeated in America East play for a second straight year to end the regular season at 8–3 as the No. 1 seed in the conference tournament. After defeating Binghamton 12–8 in the semifinals, Stony Brook was stunned in an 11–10 loss to Hartford in the America East Championship off a last-second goal by Ryan Compitello, whose brother Tom played for Stony Brook at the same time.

The Seawolves ended the season ranked #17 and did not qualify for an at-large bid to the NCAA Tournament, ending their season in disappointment. A month after the season ended, Sowell announced his resignation in the middle of his contract to accept the head coaching position at Navy. Sowell was 47–26 in five seasons as Stony Brook head coach.

=== The Jim Nagle years (2012–2019) ===
Colgate head coach Jim Nagle was named as Sowell's successor eleven days later on June 20, 2011.

==== 2012 season: Third NCAA Tournament appearance ====
Nagle's first season saw the graduation of 11 seniors, including Kevin Crowley, the first-overall draft pick in the 2011 NLL Draft. The inexperience showed early on as Stony Brook began the season 0–3, including a loss to #1 Virginia. The Seawolves won their first game of the season at #18 Delaware, a 7–6 nailbiter on the road and their first win over a ranked opponent since 2010. The season continued to spiral downward as Stony Brook would embark on a four-game losing streak, suffering home defeats to St. John's and Towson and road stumbles at Siena and Bryant (in 2OT).

At 1–7, the Seawolves' season looked bleak, but they won the first three conference matchups to build momentum before falling to #20 Yale and Hartford, both one-goal losses in overtime at home. Stony Brook defeated Albany in the regular season finale to head into the America East Tournament at 5–9. Stony Brook squeaked past Hartford in the semifinals and trounced Albany in the championship game to clinch the team's third NCAA Tournament berth and second in the last three years, doing so in Nagle's first year as head coach. Nagle won America East Coach of the Year honors for his inaugural performance.

In the First Round of the 2012 NCAA Division I Men's Lacrosse Championship, Stony Brook lost 19–9 to Johns Hopkins in Baltimore to end the season at 7–10.

==== 2013–2019: The drought years ====
In the years following the 2012 NCAA Tournament run, the Nagle-led Seawolves languished in mediocrity. Stony Brook played a tough schedule in 2013, with losses to #6 Virginia, #1 Maryland, and #12 Yale, but suffered a losing record in conference play for the first time since 2007 as the Seawolves lost two games in overtime. Their season ended with a 7–9 record after a loss to #12 Albany, 17–15, in the semifinals of the America East Tournament.

In 2014, Stony Brook had a second consecutive losing record in both overall and conference play. Stony Brook traveled to #1 Duke in a 14–6 loss, and played host to #1 Maryland in a 11–8 defeat. Stony Brook went 2–3 in conference play for a second year in a row. In the semifinals of the America East Tournament, the Seawolves lost 17–16 to #18 Albany, ending their season at 6–10 overall.

The 2015 season initially appeared to be a bounceback year for Stony Brook, who saw winning streaks of both four and five games, winning nine games in a ten-game span. The Seawolves' lone loss during that stretch was a home defeat to #15 Albany, but the team also beat #12 Princeton. Stony Brook's 10–2 start was a new program best, but back-to-back home losses against Lehigh, 12–11, and #6 Duke, 17–11, halted momentum after the five-game winning streak. Stony Brook then won the final three games of the regular season, with two overtime wins, to head into the America East Tournament at 12–4. The Seawolves beat Vermont 16–13 in the semifinals before being crushed by #6 Albany in the championship game, 22–9. Stony Brook tied the program record for wins in a season, ending 13–5, but missed the NCAA Tournament for a third straight year.

Stony Brook started 2016 strong at 5–1, with home wins over #16 Rutgers and #12 Hofstra and a loss to #9 Brown. The team's lone loss in America East play was to #11 Albany for the second straight season. Stony Brook won seven of its last eight regular season games to reach a 12–3 record. However, the Seawolves lost to Vermont 10–9 in the conference semifinals. In 2017, Stony Brook started 4–0, including a win at #10 Brown, before losing five of the next six. In a familiar scene, #6 Albany routed Stony Brook 19–6 in the America East semifinals to cap off a 7–7 campaign.

Stony Brook began the 2018 season 0–4. On March 10, Stony Brook hosted #9 Virginia, but the 15–14 loss was more memorable for the on-field fight that occurred. The Seawolves closed the season out strong, capturing a share of the America East regular season title for the first time since 2012. Nevertheless, Stony Brook lost in the semifinals of the America East Tournament for a third straight year.

In 2019, the Seawolves struggled initially, losing to #4 Penn State, Marist, Sacred Heart, and Hartford to bring their record to 3–4. However, they upset St. John's on the road, and came back from a 7–1 deficit to beat Vermont 10–9. Stony Brook clinched the regular season title by defeating Albany 12–10 at home in a rain-delayed season finale. Hosting the America East Tournament as the No. 1 seed, Stony Brook was upset at home 14–8 by UMBC in the semifinals, marking the team's fourth semifinal loss in a row. On May 14, Stony Brook athletic director Shawn Heilbron announced that Nagle would not return as head coach. In eight seasons with the Seawolves, Nagle recorded a 68–61 record overall and 31–14 in conference play, but made just one NCAA Tournament in his first season and had six one-and-dones in the America East Tournament.

=== Anthony Gilardi takes over (2020–present) ===
On June 20, Stony Brook named Towson associate head coach and offensive coordinator Anthony Gilardi as the team's new head coach. Stony Brook began the season 5–1, with three overtime victories, all of which saw Caleb Pearson score the game-winning goal.

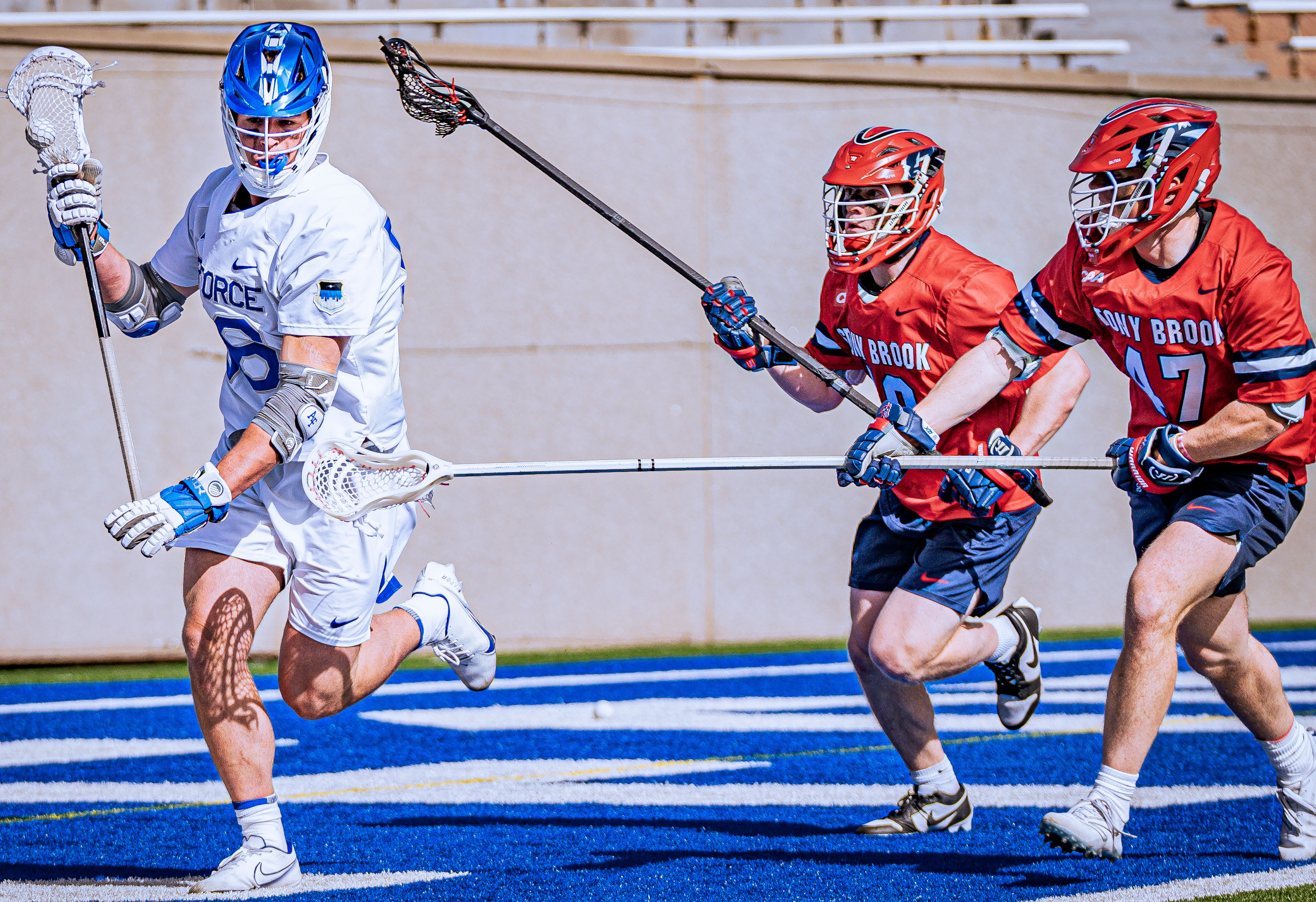
Stony Brook defenders (right) pursue an Air Force player in 2024

Before the 2022 season began, Stony Brook was banned from the America East postseason because of their impending move to the Colonial Athletic Association. In 2022, Stony Brook won the inaugural Long Island Cup by beating LIU 10–6 in the championship. In 2023, Stony Brook's first season in the CAA, the Seawolves advanced to the championship game of the CAA tournament, but lost 13–10 to Delaware. In 2024 and 2025, Stony Brook had back-to-back losing records in conference play. In 2026, Stony Brook won the CAA championship for the first time, beating Drexel 9–7 in the semifinals and Towson 13–11 in the title game, to reach the NCAA Tournament for the first time 14 years.

== Facilities ==
The Stony Brook Seawolves presently play their home games in Kenneth P. LaValle Stadium, which has a capacity of 12,300. LaValle Stadium is located on the west campus of Stony Brook University and was constructed for the 2002 season. The stadium hosted the largest lacrosse game crowd in school history in the 2010 NCAA Division I Men's Lacrosse Quarterfinals, when there was a reported attendance of 10,024.

== Coaches ==
=== Head coaches ===
The men's lacrosse program has had a total of five coaches since its first season back in 1983. Espey being responsible for the transition of the program to Division I.

Coach	Years	Overall	Conference	Conference Tournament Titles	NCAA Tournament Appearances
John Ziegler	1983–85	–	–	–	–
Bruce Casagrande	1986–87	13–13 (.500)	N/A	–	–
John Espey	1988–2004	116–123 (.485)	11–17 (.392)^{2}	1	1
Lars Tiffany	2005–06	18–13 (.581)	8–3 (.727)	–	–
Rick Sowell	2007–11	47–26 (.643)	19–6 (.760)	1	1
Jim Nagle	2012–19	68–61 (.527)	31–14 (.689)	1	1
Anthony Gilardi	2020–	42–37 (.532)	20–16 (.555)		

=== Current Coaching staff ===
- Anthony Gilardi – Head Coach, 7th year
- Mike Chanenchuk —Associate Head Coach, 7th year
- Mike Daly - Assistant Coach, 2nd year
- Quintin Germain - Assistant Coach, 2nd year

== Season-by-season results ==
The following are the final year-end standings of the men's lacrosse program since 1983. In 2000, the Seawolves moved up to Division I and in 2002, the program joined the America East Conference. Stony Brook will begin play in the Colonial Athletic Association starting in the 2023 season.

Season	Coach	Overall	Conference	Standing	Postseason
John Ziegler (Division III Independent) (1983–1985)
1983	John Ziegler	9–3			
1984	John Ziegler	11–3			
1985	John Ziegler	10–4			ECAC Champions
John Ziegler:		30–10 (.750)			
Bruce Casagrande (Division II Independent) (1986–1987)
1986	Bruce Casagrande	6–6			
1987	Bruce Casagrande	7–7			ECAC Semifinals
Bruce Casagrande:		13–13 (.500)			
John Espey (Division I Independent) (1988–1999)
1988	John Espey	6–8			ECAC Semifinals
1989	John Espey	10–4			
1990	John Espey	12–2			
1991	John Espey	8–5			
1992	John Espey	7–7			
1993	John Espey	3–11			
1994	John Espey	3–10			
1995	John Espey	7–7			
1996	John Espey	3–8			
1997	John Espey	9–4			
1998	John Espey	7–5			
1999	John Espey	5–8			
John Espey (ECAC Lacrosse League) (2000–2001)
2000	John Espey	5–11	0–6		
2001	John Espey	7–7	1–5		
John Espey (America East Conference) (2002–2004)
2002	John Espey	10–7	3–2	3rd	NCAA First Round
2003	John Espey	5–10	3–2	3rd	
2004	John Espey	9–6	4–2	4th	
John Espey:		116–123 (.485)	11–17 (.393)		
Lars Tiffany (America East Conference) (2005–2006)
2005	Lars Tiffany	10–6	4–2	4th	
2006	Lars Tiffany	8–7	4–1	2nd	
Lars Tiffany:		18–13 (.581)	8–3 (.727)		
Rick Sowell (America East Conference) (2007–2011)
2007	Rick Sowell	8–5	2–3	4th	
2008	Rick Sowell	7–7	3–2	3rd	
2009	Rick Sowell	9–6	4–1	T–1st	
2010	Rick Sowell	13–4	5–0	1st	NCAA Quarterfinals
2011	Rick Sowell	10–4	5–0	1st	
Rick Sowell:		47–26 (.644)	19–6 (.760)		
Jim Nagle (America East Conference) (2012–2019)
2012	Jim Nagle	7–10	4–1	1st	NCAA First Round
2013	Jim Nagle	7–9	2–3	4th	
2014	Jim Nagle	6–10	2–3	4th	
2015	Jim Nagle	13–5	5–1	2nd	
2016	Jim Nagle	12–3	5–1	2nd	
2017	Jim Nagle	7–7	3–3	4th	
2018	Jim Nagle	7–8	5–1	T–1st	
2019	Jim Nagle	9–6	5–1	1st	
Jim Nagle:		68–59 (.535)	31–14 (.689)		
Anthony Gilardi (America East Conference) (2020–2022)
2020	Anthony Gilardi	5–2			†
2021	Anthony Gilardi	8–6	6–3	2nd	
2022	Anthony Gilardi	9–5	4–2	2nd	
Anthony Gilardi (Colonial Athletic Association) (2023–present)
2023	Anthony Gilardi	9–7	5–2	3rd	
2024	Anthony Gilardi	4–10	2–5	7th	
2025	Anthony Gilardi	7–7	3–4	6th	
2026	Anthony Gilardi	10–5	4–2	3rd	NCAA Tournament
Anthony Gilardi:		42–37 (.532)	20–16 (.556)		
Total:		334–280 (.544)			
National champion Postseason invitational champion Conference regular season champion Conference regular season and conference tournament champion Division regular season champion Division regular season and conference tournament champion Conference tournament champion

†NCAA canceled 2020 season due to COVID-19 pandemic

== Postseason results ==
Year	Seed	Round	Opponent	Score
2002	–	First Round	Cornell	L, 3–12
2010	#8	First Round Quarterfinal	Denver #1 Virginia	W, 9–7 L, 9–10
2012	–	First Round	Johns Hopkins	L, 9–19
2026	–	Opening Round	Marist	
