= Binghamton Bearcats men's lacrosse =

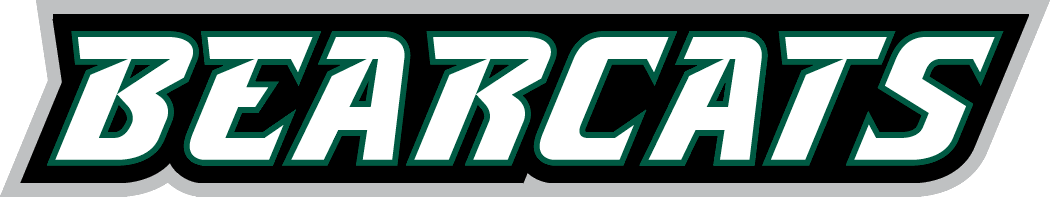
- Founded: 2002
- University: Binghamton University
- Head coach: Kevin McKeown
- Stadium: Bearcats Sports Complex (capacity: 2,534)
- Conference: America East Conference
- Colors: Dark green, white, and black

Conference regular season championships
- 2004

The Binghamton Bearcats men's lacrosse team is an NCAA Division I college lacrosse team that represents Binghamton University in Binghamton, New York, United States. The school's teams compete as members of the America East Conference. The Bearcats hired Kevin McKeown in July 2016 to become the 3rd head coach in the history of the program.

== History ==
=== Conference affiliations ===
- America East (2002–present)

== Year-by-year results ==
| Season | Coach | Overall | Conference | Standing | Postseason |
|---|---|---|---|---|---|
| 2002 | Ed Stevenson | 1–8 | 0–5 | 6th | |
| 2003 | Ed Stevenson | 4–8 | 1–4 | 5th | |
| 2004 | Ed Stevenson | 10–6 | 6–0 | 1st | |
| 2005 | Ed Stevenson | 4–9 | 4–2 | 3rd | |
| 2006 | Ed Stevenson | 7–8 | 2–3 | 4th | |
| 2007 | Ed Stevenson | 4–9 | 3–2 | 3rd | |
| 2008 | Ed Stevenson | 4–8 | 2–3 | 4th | |
| 2009 | Ed Stevenson | 3–12 | 2–3 | 4th | |
| 2010 | Ed Stevenson | 4–10 | 1–4 | T-5th | |
| 2011 | Ed Stevenson / Kevin McKeown | 7–8 | 3–2 | T-2nd | |
| 2012 | Scott Nelson | 4–9 | 1–4 | T-5th | |
| 2013 | Scott Nelson | 5–9 | 1–4 | 5th | |
| 2014 | Scott Nelson | 7–8 | 4–1 | 2nd | |
| 2015 | Scott Nelson | 4–9 | 2–4 | 5th | |
| 2016 | Scott Nelson | 4–10 | 2–4 | 5th | |
| 2017 | Kevin McKeown | 11–5 | 4–2 | 3rd | |
| 2018 | Kevin McKeown | 4–11 | 1–5 | 6th | |
| 2019 | Kevin McKeown | 2–11 | 2–4 | T-4th | |
| 2020 | Kevin McKeown | 1–5 | | | |
| 2021 | Kevin McKeown | 5–4 | 5–4 | 5th | |
| 2022 | Kevin McKeown | 5–9 | 3–3 | T-3rd | |
| 2023 | Kevin McKeown | 9–5 | 5–2 | T-2nd | |
| 2024 | Kevin McKeown | 6–7 | 4–3 | T-3rd | |
| 2025 | Kevin McKeown | 5–9 | 3–3 | T-4th | |
| 2026 | Kevin McKeown | 0–3 | 0–0 | | |

=== All-time coaching records ===
| Head coach | Years | Win–loss | Pct. |
|---|---|---|---|
| Ed Stephenson | 2002–2011 | 45–81 | .357 |
| Scott Nelson | 2012–2016 | 24–45 | .348 |
| Kevin McKeown | 2011, 2017–present | 51–73 | .411 |
