= Albany Great Danes men's lacrosse =

Albany Great Danes
- Founded: 1970
- University: University at Albany
- Head coach: Scott Marr (since 2001 season)
- Stadium: Bob Ford Field at Tom & Mary Casey Stadium (capacity: 8,500)
- Location: Albany, New York
- Conference: America East
- Nickname: Great Danes
- Colors: Purple and gold

NCAA Tournament Final Fours
- (1) – 2018

NCAA Tournament Quarterfinals
- (5) – 2007, 2014, 2015, 2017, 2018

NCAA Tournament appearances
- (13) – 2003, 2004, 2005, 2007, 2013, 2014, 2015, 2016, 2017, 2018, 2024, 2025, 2026

Conference Tournament championships
- (12) – 2003, 2004, 2005, 2007, 2013, 2014, 2015, 2017, 2018, 2024, 2025, 2026

Conference regular season championships
- (11) – 2002, 2003, 2007, 2013, 2014, 2015, 2016, 2017, 2018, 2024, 2026

The Albany Great Danes men's lacrosse team represents the University at Albany in NCAA Division I men's college lacrosse. Albany competes in the America East Conference and plays its home games at Bob Ford Field at Tom & Mary Casey Stadium. The team has appeared in the NCAA Men's Lacrosse Championship twelve times. The Great Danes are coached by Scott Marr.

== History ==
The men's lacrosse program at UAlbany began as a club team in 1968 following an interest meeting held in the basement of Waterbury Hall, a residence hall at the university. Twenty people attended the meeting, including alumnus Steven Jakway, who helped to raise general interest in lacrosse at UAlbany by posting notices around the campus.

In 1970, the UAlbany men's lacrosse team was elevated to varsity status and initially competed at the NCAA Division III level, finishing with a 3–7 competition record. In 1975, the program reached the ECAC Division III Tournament under coach Dave Armstrong. From 1975 to 1997, the Great Danes participated in two additional ECAC Division III Tournaments. In 1997, the Great Danes reached the finals of the ECAC Division II Tournament.

=== 2000–2006 ===
In 2000, the Great Danes entered the America East Division as a Division I program, finishing their first season with a record of 6–5. In 2001, Scott Marr was named as Head Coach. He ended his first season with a 3–8 record. In 2002, Albany achieved a record of 8–6 in the regular season, winning the America East Conference regular season championship. Albany advanced to the America East Conference championship game, but lost to the Stony Brook Seawolves by a score of 8–6.

The 2003 season featured lacrosse players on scholarship such as Kevin Rae and Luke D'Aquino. The Great Danes finished the regular season 8–6 and faced Stony Brook again in the America East semifinals, winning 11–5 and advancing to face the University of Hartford in the America East Championship. On May 3, that year, Albany defeated Hartford with a final score of 7–5 to win their first America East Championship. Albany exited the 2003 NCAA Division I men's lacrosse tournament after a first-round loss to Princeton University.

In 2003, the Great Danes continued competing in the America East Championship. Their 2004 campaign included a loss against the University of Massachusetts Amherst. However, the Great Danes ultimately won the America East Championship that year. The Great Danes also faced Syracuse University in the 2004 NCAA Division I men's lacrosse tournament, losing to them 21–13.

In 2005, the Great Danes defeated Stony Brook 16–7 to win a third consecutive America East Championship. The run of first round NCAA Tournament losses would continue as the Great Danes lost to the University of Virginia 23–9.

In 2006, then career points leader Luke D'Aquino and career saves leader Kevin Rae graduated. The Great Danes would advance to the America East Tournament, but lose 19–10 to UMBC.

In the fall of 2005, an all-weather facility, the John Fallon Field was completed and became the new home of the Great Danes. In previous seasons, the team would play home games at University Field. However, due to harsh winters and wet springs, the field was usually not in playing condition during lacrosse season. This forced many home games to be played at local high schools and community colleges.

=== 2007 season ===
In the 2007 season, the lacrosse team would be ranked in the top-25 in both USILA and Nike/Inside Lacrosse polls and reached a high of #2 in the USILA poll. Notable wins were against #1 ranked Johns Hopkins Blue Jays and #10 Delaware. On May 13, 2007, the men's lacrosse team became the first team at the Division I level to win a match in the NCAA Tournament, defeating Loyola College in Maryland 19–10 in front of nearly 3,000 people at John Fallon Field. One week later, the Great Danes were defeated by Cornell University 12–11 in the NCAA Quarterfinals at Princeton University.

The team finished ranked #4 in the Nike/Inside Lacrosse poll, the highest ranking in UAlbany history. Head Coach Scott Marr was awarded the USILA Division I National Lacrosse Coach of the Year.

In 2007, Frank Resetarits, a senior attackman, was named to the 2007 USILA All-America Team, making him the first Great Dane to earn first-team All-American honors. Resetarits was also named a finalist for the Tewaaraton Trophy. Resetarits became the first player in school history to be drafted into Major League Lacrosse after being selected by the Washington Bayhawks, but was traded and eventually made his debut with the Long Island Lizards. Resetarits would also join the National Lacrosse League, drafted #5 overall by the San Jose Stealth in the 2007 NLL Draft.

Resetarits was joined in the pros by UAlbany's Merrick Thomson. Thomson signed a free agent contract with the New Jersey Pride on the MLL before being drafted #2 overall by the Philadelphia Wings in the 2007 NLL Draft. Thomson and Resetarits were respectively ranked one and two in career points at Albany following the season. Defender Liam Gleason was also signed by the New Jersey Pride shortly after the 2007 Major League Lacrosse draft.

Two other players from the championship team were drafted in the 2008 Major League Lacrosse draft. Midfielder Jordan Levine was selected 10th overall by the New Jersey Pride, reuniting him with Thomson and Gleason. Goaltender Brett Queener was selected 48th overall by the Rochester Rattlers.

=== 2013 season ===
In 2013, the Great Danes opened their season at Syracuse. They had never defeated The Orange, who were ranked #13 in the nation. UAlbany beat them in double-overtime 16–15. It was the first loss opening the season for Syracuse since 1996.

After going 5–3 in their next eight games, the Great Danes travelled to Johns Hopkins. The games were shown on national television (ESPNU). UAlbany, ranked #20 at the time and defeated the #10-ranked Blue Jays 10–9. Freshman goalie Blaze Riorden had 20 saves.

The Great Danes finished the season going 4–1 through their last 5, leading to an 11–4 overall. UAlbany went 5–0 in regular-season America East play for the second time in program history. The Great Danes went 9–2 on the road while only 3–2 at home. On May 4, after five years without a title, the Great Danes defeated UMBC 19–10 to win the America East Championship. However, the Great Danes lost to Denver in the first round of the NCAA Tournament. Head Coach Scott Marr recorded his 100th career win at UAlbany during the season.

=== Thompson Trio ===
Miles Thompson, Ty Thompson, and Lyle Thompson (also known as the Thompson Trio) were attackers for the team in 2013. Miles and Lyle are brothers, while Ty is their cousin (another brother, Jeremy Thompson, played for Syracuse until 2011). The three were born in the Onondaga Nation, a nine-square-mile independent political entity recognized by the United States. Each of the Thompsons wore a traditional native hair style with long braids on the field. The three also became known for their skills on the field, which involved trick passes and stick handling, behind-the-back shots, and one-handed shots.

In 2013, Ty Thompson scored 51 goals, Miles scored 42 and Lyle 46 goals going into the NCAA Tournament. The fourth leading scorers for the Great Danes, Will Fuller and John Maloney, had only 18 goals. Lyle Thompson led the offense with 108 points through 17 games. He became the eighth men's lacrosse player in NCAA history to record 100 points in a season. He won the America East Player of the Year Award and became the second Great Dane and the first Native American to be named a Tewaaraton Award finalist.

In 2014, the Thompsons continued to play. Despite a 9–5 regular season, the Great Danes were the #1 overall seed in the America East Tournament. Lyle became the third player in conference history to win back-to-back Player of the Year Awards. Earning at least four points in all 14 games played, the junior attack earned a Division I-best 61 assists and 37 goals in the regular season. In the American East Tournament, Lyle became the first Division I player ever to earn two 100-point seasons. On May 3, 2014, for the second time, the Great Danes won their second straight America East Championship, defeating UMBC 20–11.

On May 10, 2014, the Great Danes played against Loyola in the first round of the NCAA Tournament. Loyola was the #1-ranked team in the nation going into the game. The Great Danes defeated the Greyhounds 13–6 for the second NCAA Tournament victory in school history. In the game, Lyle became the DI single-season record holder in points, beating out Marahol's record he missed in the previous season. In the game Miles passed Marahol's numbers to become second on that list after scoring five goals and two assists. The Great Danes lost 14–13 in overtime to Notre Dame in the Quarterfinals the following week.

As a junior, Lyle compiled the top single-season point total in DI history, earning 128 points as well as tying the DI single-season assists record with 77, adding 51 goals. He became the first player in DI history to have a pair of 100+ point seasons after finishing with 113 last year. In UAlbany's 18 games in 2014, he scored at least four points, including 11 contests for at least 7 points each. He was named Division I Outstanding Player of the Year and the DI Outstanding Attackman by the United States Intercollegiate Lacrosse Association (USILA) in 2014.

On May 29, 2014, both Miles and Lyle Thompson were named the co-winners of the 2014 Tewaaraton Trophy. It was the first time ever that two players shared the trophy, and Native Americans were awarded the trophy. Two days later, Miles and Ty were officially put on the active roster of the MLL Rochester Rattlers. It was also announced that Miles would return to the program in 2015 as a Graduate Assistant.

The success of the Thompson Trio on the pitch led to a national press following in late 2014. CNN, CBS, and ABC all did nightly news pieces on the three. The NY Times also did a story on them, which was posted on the front page of the newspaper. In all the pieces, the three talked about their heritage, the acceptance of their heritage at UAlbany, supporting the Onondaga Nation, and promoting the game of lacrosse.

==== Lyle Thompson Career (2012–2015) ====
In 2015, Lyle Thompson was widely recognized as one of the most accomplished collegiate lacrosse players of his era. He was named the recipient of the 2015 Tewaaraton Trophy for the top player in men's lacrosse and was the first ever male lacrosse player to earn the award in two consecutive seasons. In 2015, Thompson led the NCAA in points per game for the third-straight year with 6.37 a contest and assists per game at 3.63 a contest. He finished with an NCAA Division I best 121 points, the second-highest single season tally in DI history, and 69 assists, adding 52 goals. He led UAlbany to a third-consecutive America East regular season and tournament title. The Great Danes took on Cornell in the first round of the NCAA Tournament, winning 19–10. In a rematch of the 2014 quarterfinals, UAlbany lost to Notre Dame 14–10. Thompson finished his career as the all-time Division I points and assists leader, concluding with 400 points off 175 goals and 225 assists from 2012 to 2015 with UAlbany. In his career he played in 70 games, scoring in 68 of them and earned multiple points in each of his last 44 games, including all contests in 2014 and 2015.

=== #1 Ranking and the Final Four ===
In the 2018 season, the Great Dane offense was led by Senior Connor Fields and incoming freshman Tehoka Nanticoke, who had previously been one of the highest ranked high school players in the nation. The Great Danes would begin the season ranked #3 nationwide. The team opened the season with a 15–3 victory over Syracuse. One week later, after an 18–5 win over Drexel, the Great Danes would be ranked as the #1 team in the nation by the United States Intercollegiate Lacrosse Association (USILA) coaches poll and the Inside Lacrosse Maverik media poll. It would be the first time that any UAlbany Division I team, and any DI program affiliated with the State University of New York (SUNY) system, had been ranked #1 in its history. The Great Danes would win eight consecutive games as the #1 ranked team in the nation, including a comeback in the fourth quarter against #2 ranked Maryland 11–10 on March 10 of 2018. The streak and #1 ranking would last until April 6, when UAlbany was upset by UMBC 11–7.

Most of the mid-season success for UAlbany came without their key players on the field. Connor Fields suffered a knee injury in a March 24 victory over UMAss-Lowell. He would re-injure the knee in the second-to-last game of the season in a 14–6 loss to Yale. The mid-season lineup included sophomore face-off specialist TD Ierlan, sophomore Jakob Patterson and senior Kyle McClancy on offense, and goalie JD Colarusso.

The Great Danes ran through the America East Tournament as the #1 seed and host to take home the title on May 5 in a 14–4 win over Vermont. UAlbany would be given the #2 overall seed in the 2018 NCAA Lacrosse Tournament and would host the Southern Conference champion Richmond Spiders in the 1st Round of the tournament. UAlbany would win 18–9 to advance to the NCAA Quarterfinals to face the Denver Pioneers at Hofstra.

For the May 19th match-up between Albany and Denver, media attention focused on the matchup of the top two face-off men in the country, UAlbany's TD Ierlan and Denver's Trevor Baptiste. In this game, each player would go 15-of-30. During the game, Ierlan would win his 341st face-off of the season, setting a new NCAA single-season record. The former record holder was Brendan Fowler, who had 339 face-off wins for Duke in 2013. The Great Danes held a four-goal lead with under five minutes to play. UAlbany held on 15–13 to advance to the Final Four for the first time in school history after going 0–4 in their previous trips to the Quarterfinals. It would be the first time a SUNY school earned a trip to a Men's Division I Final Four. UAlbany also matched its single-season wins record with its 16th victory today. UAlbany was 16–3 in 2015. UAlbany's senior class earned its 59th victory, becoming the winningest class in program history. The class was 59–11 overall in its four years.

== Coaches ==
=== Current coaching staff ===
- Head coach – Scott Marr (Johns Hopkins, 1991)
- Associate head coach – Merrick Thomson (UAlbany, 2007)
- Assistant coach – John Maloney (UAlbany, 2016)

=== All-time head coaches ===
| Years | Coach | Win | Loss | Win % | Conference titles | NCAA Tournament appearances | NCAA titles |
|---|---|---|---|---|---|---|---|
| 1970 | Bill Muse | 3 | 7 | .300 | - | - | - |
| 1971–1973 | Bob Ford | 19 | 11 | .633 | - | - | - |
| 1974–1975 | Dave Armstrong | 10 | 13 | .435 | - | - | - |
| 1976 | Steve Axman | 6 | 5 | .545 | - | - | - |
| 1977–1983 | Mike Motta | 36 | 45 | .444 | - | - | - |
| 1984 | Gary Campbell | 7 | 6 | .538 | - | - | - |
| 1985 | Rick Flanders | 3 | 10 | .231 | - | - | - |
| 1986 | Chuck Priore | 5 | 8 | .385 | - | - | - |
| 1987 | Tom Fogarty | 5 | 7 | .417 | - | - | - |
| 1988–1994 | Steve O'Shea | 45 | 37 | .549 | - | - | - |
| 1995–2000 | Mark Wimmer | 42 | 31 | .575 | - | - | - |
| 2001–present | Scott Marr | 202 | 146 | .580 | 10 (America East) | 11 (NCAA D-I) | - |

== Season results ==
The following is a list of Albany's season results since the institution of NCAA Division I in 1971 (Albany competed as a Division III program from 1970 to 1995 and as a Division II program from 1996 to 1999):

| Season | Coach | Overall | Conference | Standing | Postseason |
|---|---|---|---|---|---|
Bob Ford (Independent) (1971–1973)
| 1971 | Bob Ford | 8–2 | | | |
| 1972 | Bob Ford | 7–2 | | | |
| 1973 | Bob Ford | 4–7 | | | |
| Bob Ford: | | 19–11 (.633) | | | |
Dave Armstrong (Independent) (1974–1975)
| 1974 | Dave Armstrong | 4–7 | | | |
| 1975 | Dave Armstrong | 6–6 | | | ECAC Division III Tournament |
| Dave Armstrong: | | 10–13 (.435) | | | |
Steve Axman (Independent) (1976–1977)
| 1976 | Steve Axman | 6–5 | | | |
| Steve Axman: | | 6–5 (.545) | | | |
Mike Motta (Independent) (1977–1983)
| 1977 | Mike Motta | 6–6 | | | |
| 1978 | Mike Motta | 5–7 | | | |
| 1979 | Mike Motta | 4–8 | | | |
| 1980 | Mike Motta | 6–5 | | | |
| 1981 | Mike Motta | 5–8 | | | |
| 1982 | Mike Motta | 6–8 | | | |
| 1983 | Mike Motta | 7–5 | | | |
| Mike Motta: | | 39–47 (.453) | | | |
Gary Campbell (Independent) (1984–1985)
| 1984 | Gary Campbell | 7–6 | | | |
| Gary Campbell: | | 7–6 (.538) | | | |
Rick Flanders (Independent) (1985–1986)
| 1985 | Rick Flanders | 3–10 | | | |
| Rick Flanders: | | 3–10 (.231) | | | |
Chuck Priore (Independent) (1986–1987)
| 1986 | Chuck Priore | 9–8 | | | |
| Chuck Priore: | | 9–8 (.529) | | | |
Tom Fogarty (Independent) (1987–1988)
| 1987 | Tom Fogarty | 5–7 | | | |
| Tom Fogarty: | | 5–7 (.417) | | | |
Steve O'Shea (Independent) (1988–1994)
| 1988 | Steve O'Shea | 2–9 | | | |
| 1989 | Steve O'Shea | 7–4 | | | |
| 1990 | Steve O'Shea | 4–7 | | | |
| 1991 | Steve O'Shea | 7–5 | | | |
| 1992 | Steve O'Shea | 10–3 | | | ECAC Division III Tournament |
| 1993 | Steve O'Shea | 8–3 | | | |
| 1994 | Steve O'Shea | 7–6 | | | ECAC Division III Tournament |
| Steve O'Shea: | | 45–37 (.549) | | | |
Mark Wimmer (Independent) (1995–2000)
| 1995 | Mark Wimmer | 6–5 | | | |
| 1996 | Mark Wimmer | 7–6 | | | |
| 1997 | Mark Wimmer | 8–5 | | | ECAC Division II Runner-Up |
| 1998 | Mark Wimmer | 8–4 | | | |
| 1999 | Mark Wimmer | 7–6 | | | |
| 2000 | Mark Wimmer | 6–5 | | | |
| Mark Wimmer: | | 42–31 (.575) | | | |
Scott Marr (Independent) (2001–2002)
| 2001 | Scott Marr | 3–8 | | | |
Scott Marr (America East Conference) (2002–Present)
| 2002 | Scott Marr | 9–7 | 5–0 | 1st | |
| 2003 | Scott Marr | 10–6 | 4–1 | T–1st | NCAA Division I First Round |
| 2004 | Scott Marr | 10–6 | 4–2 | | NCAA Division I First Round |
| 2005 | Scott Marr | 10–6 | 5–1 | 2nd | NCAA Division I First Round |
| 2006 | Scott Marr | 8–7 | 3–2 | | |
| 2007 | Scott Marr | 15–3 | 4–1 | T–1st | NCAA Division I Quarterfinals |
| 2008 | Scott Marr | 8–8 | 4–1 | 2nd | |
| 2009 | Scott Marr | 7–7 | 3–2 | 3rd | |
| 2010 | Scott Marr | 5–11 | 3–2 | T–2nd | |
| 2011 | Scott Marr | 5–10 | 0–5 | 6th | |
| 2012 | Scott Marr | 5–11 | 3–2 | T–2nd | |
| 2013 | Scott Marr | 13–5 | 5–0 | 1st | NCAA Division I First Round |
| 2014 | Scott Marr | 12–6 | 5–0 | 1st | NCAA Division I Quarterfinals |
| 2015 | Scott Marr | 16–3 | 6–0 | 1st | NCAA Division I Quarterfinals |
| 2016 | Scott Marr | 12–4 | 6–0 | 1st | NCAA Division I First Round |
| 2017 | Scott Marr | 15–3 | 6–0 | 1st | NCAA Division I Quarterfinals |
| 2018 | Scott Marr | 16–3 | 5–1 | T–1st | NCAA Division I Final Four |
| 2019 | Scott Marr | 5–9 | 4–2 | T–2nd | |
| 2020 | Scott Marr | 2–3 | 0–0 | † | † |
| 2021 | Scott Marr | 8–5 | 5–3 | 4th | |
| 2022 | Scott Marr | 5–10 | 3–3 | 5th | |
| 2023 | Scott Marr | 6–10 | 4–3 | 4th | |
| 2024 | Scott Marr | 10-8 (4–5) | 6–1 | 1st | NCAA Division I First Round |
| 2025 | Scott Marr | 10–9 | 4–2 | 3rd | NCAA Division I First Round |
| Scott Marr: | | 228–173 (.569) | 99–35 (.739) | | |
| Total: | | 413–348 (.543) | | | |
National champion Postseason invitational champion Conference regular season champion Conference regular season and conference tournament champion Division regular season champion Division regular season and conference tournament champion Conference tournament champion

† NCAA canceled 2020 collegiate activities due to the COVID-19 virus

== Alumni in the PLL ==
This is a list of Albany alumni currently playing in the Premier Lacrosse League:

- Connor Fields
- TD Ierlan
- Jake Piseno
- Troy Reh
- Silas Richmond
- Blaze Riorden

== Division I Award winners ==
=== Lt. Raymond Enners Award ===
- Lyle Thompson (2014, 2015)

=== Tewaaraton Award ===
- Lyle and Miles Thompson (2014)
- Lyle Thompson (2015)

=== Jack Turnbull Award ===
- Lyle Thompson (2013, 2014)
- Connor Fields (2017)

=== Ensign C. Markland Kelly Jr. Award ===
- JD Colarusso (2018)

=== Schmeisser Award ===
- Jake Piseno (2024)

== Division I First Team All-Americans ==
- Frank Resetarits (2007, attack)
- Lyle Thompson (2013, 2014, 2015, attack)
- Miles Thompson (2014, attack)
- Connor Fields (2017, 2018, attack)
- JD Colarusso (2018, goalie)
- Jake Piseno (2024, LSM)

== National team players ==
This is a list of Albany alumni who have played in either a World Lacrosse Championship or World Lacrosse Box Championships:

=== Canada ===
- Connor Fields (field)
- Merrick Thomson (field)

=== Haudenosaunee ===
- Ron John (field)
- Tehoka Nanticoke (field)
- Jakob Patterson (field)
- Jake Piseno (field)
- Lyle Thompson (box, field)
- Miles Thompson (box, field)
- Ty Thompson (field)
- Jack VanValkenburgh (field)

=== Jamaica ===
- Dwayne Stewart (field)

=== Latvia ===
- Eli Lasda (field)
- Riley Lasda (field)

=== Puerto Rico ===
- Steve Ramirez (field)
- Will Ramos (field)

=== United States ===
- TD Ierlan (field)
- Joe Resetarits (box)
- Blaze Riorden (box, field)
