= UMBC Retrievers men's lacrosse =

University of Maryland, Baltimore County NCAA men's lacrosse team

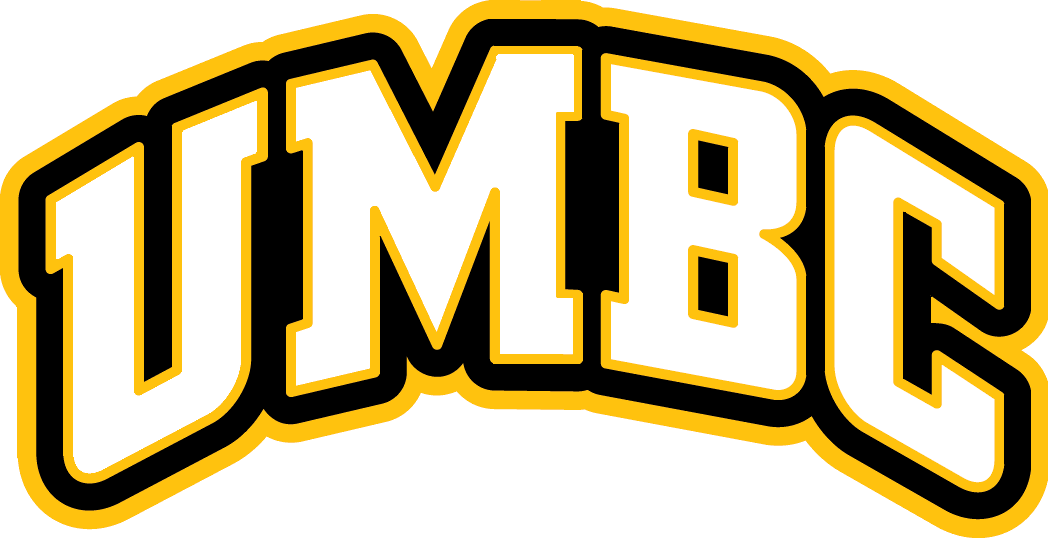
- Founded: 1968
- University: University of Maryland, Baltimore County
- Head coach: Ryan Moran (since 2016 season)
- Stadium: UMBC Stadium (capacity: 4,500)
- Location: Catonsville, Maryland
- Conference: America East
- Nickname: Retrievers
- Colors: Black and gold

NCAA Tournament championships
- (1) - 1980*

NCAA Tournament Runner-Up
- (1) - 1979*

NCAA Tournament Final Fours
- (4) - 1977*, 1978*, 1979*, 1980*

NCAA Tournament Quarterfinals
- (7) - 1974*, 1975*, 1977*, 1978*, 1979*, 1980*, 2007

NCAA Tournament appearances
- (14) - 1974*, 1975*, 1976*, 1977*, 1978*, 1979*, 1980*, 1998, 1999, 2006, 2007, 2008, 2009, 2019

Conference Tournament championships
- (4) - 2006, 2008, 2009, 2019

Conference regular season championships
- (10) - 1975, 1976, 1977, 1978, 2005, 2006, 2007, 2008, 2009, 2021, 2025; *Division II

The UMBC Retrievers men's lacrosse team represents the University of Maryland, Baltimore County (UMBC), in National Collegiate Athletic Association (NCAA) Division I men's college lacrosse competition. The Retrievers play their home games at UMBC Stadium, located in Baltimore, Maryland with a capacity of 4,500 spectators. UMBC competes as a member of the America East Conference. The program has an all-time record of 389–345 including pre-NCAA results.

== History ==
The University of Maryland, Baltimore County was founded in 1966, and athletic director and men's lacrosse coach Dick Watts started the first team in 1968 at the NCAA Division II level. The Retrievers advanced to the NCAA Division II championship finals in 1979 and 1980, winning the national title in 1980. In 1981, UMBC promoted its lacrosse team to the Division I level. Watts, however, struggled to build the team in the face of poor facilities and scheduling.

In 1989, newly hired athletic director Charlie Brown began campaigning for upgrades to UMBC Stadium, which finally came to fruition in 1996 with funding of $2.3 million. In 1993, UMBC increased its scholarship allotment from eight to the NCAA maximum of 12.6. That year, Watts resigned as head coach and was replaced by Don Zimmerman, who had previously led Johns Hopkins to three national championships. Early in his tenure at UMBC, Zimmerman and his staff had difficulty recruiting in their targeted region, New York. Of Zimmerman's initial 1994 recruiting class of nine, only two players remained at UMBC for the entirety of their collegiate career. In 1996, an increased strength of schedule led to a 3–9 finish for the Retrievers, which included a school record 27 goals allowed against Towson State. The UMBC staff landed some highly sought after Baltimore area recruits and transfers with the incentive of early playing time, including two Baltimore Sun Players of the Year in 1996. In 1997, UMBC improved to a 9–3 record, but missed the tournament because of a relatively weak schedule. The Retrievers entered the 1998 season with a No. 18 preseason ranking, and upset Maryland, 12–8, to clinch an invitation to the school's first NCAA Division I tournament as the No. 8 seed. UMBC returned to the tournament the following year.

Into the 2000s, UMBC continued to grow as a nationally competitive team. The Retrievers won the America East Conference tournaments in 2006, 2008, and 2009, while being eliminated in the final in 2007. In 2007, UMBC upset seventh-seeded Maryland, 13–9, in the first round to advance to the NCAA tournament quarterfinals where they were eliminated by Delaware. The Retrievers finished the 2009 season with a 12–4 record, winning the America East tournament before being eliminated in the first round of the NCAA tournament by North Carolina.

Going into the 2010s, the Retrievers struggled as the Hartford Hawks and Albany Great Danes both rose as America East powers. During this time, the Retrievers finished with a winning record once, an 8–7 season in 2014. During this time, numerous players transferred out of the program, most notably Pat Young to Maryland in 2015. However, they did make the 2013 and 2014 America East Championship games, falling both times. In 2015, the Retrievers failed to make the conference tournament for the first time since joining the America East, and a similar finish in 2016 resulted in longtime coach Don Zimmerman retiring at the end of the season .

On June 20, 2016, UMBC hired former Loyola Greyhound assistant Ryan Moran as head coach.

== Season results ==
The following is a list of UMBC's results by season since the institution of NCAA Division I in 1971:

Season	Coach	Overall	Conference	Standing	Postseason
Dick Watts (Independent) (1971–1972)
1971	Dick Watts	9–6			
1972	Dick Watts	10–5			
Dick Watts (Mason–Dixon Conference) (1973–1978)
1973	Dick Watts	6–9	1–3		
1974	Dick Watts	13–5	5–2		NCAA Division II Quarterfinals
1975	Dick Watts	13–2	6–0	1st	NCAA Division II Quarterfinals
1976	Dick Watts	8–6	5–0	1st	NCAA Division II First Round
1977	Dick Watts	8–6	2–1	1st	NCAA Division II Final Four
1978	Dick Watts	10–4	4–0	1st	NCAA Division II Final Four
Dick Watts (Independent) (1979–1993)
1979	Dick Watts	8–7			NCAA Division II Runner–Up
1980	Dick Watts	11–3			NCAA Division II Champion
1981	Dick Watts	8–3			
1982	Dick Watts	5–8			
1983	Dick Watts	6–7			
1984	Dick Watts	5–11			
1985	Dick Watts	3–10			
1986	Dick Watts	6–7			
1987	Dick Watts	4–9			
1988	Dick Watts	7–7			
1989	Dick Watts	6–8			
1990	Dick Watts	6–7			
1991	Dick Watts	10–5			
1992	Dick Watts	10–5			
1993	Dick Watts	6–8			
Dick Watts:		178–148 (.546)	23–6 (.793)		
Don Zimmerman (Independent) (1994–2003)
1994	Don Zimmerman	7–7			
1995	Don Zimmerman	4–9			
1996	Don Zimmerman	3–9			
1997	Don Zimmerman	9–3			
1998	Don Zimmerman	9–5			NCAA Division I First Round
1999	Don Zimmerman	11–4			NCAA Division I First Round
2000	Don Zimmerman	7–7			
2001	Don Zimmerman	5–7			
2002	Don Zimmerman	5–7			
2003	Don Zimmerman	7–6			
Don Zimmerman (America East Conference) (2004–2016)
2004	Don Zimmerman	6–8	4–2		
2005	Don Zimmerman	7–8	5–1	1st	
2006	Don Zimmerman	10–5	5–0	1st	NCAA Division I First Round
2007	Don Zimmerman	11–6	4–1	T–1st	NCAA Division I Quarterfinals
2008	Don Zimmerman	12–4	5–0	1st	NCAA Division I First Round
2009	Don Zimmerman	12–4	4–1	T–1st	NCAA Division I First Round
2010	Don Zimmerman	4–9	3–2	T–2nd	
2011	Don Zimmerman	6–7	3–2	T–2nd	
2012	Don Zimmerman	5–8	3–2	T–2nd	
2013	Don Zimmerman	7–8	3–2	T–2nd	
2014	Don Zimmerman	8–7	3–2	3rd	
2015	Don Zimmerman	5–8	1–5	6th	
2016	Don Zimmerman	4–10	1–5	6th	
Don Zimmerman:		164–156 (.513)	44–25 (.638)		
Ryan Moran (America East Conference) (2017–present)
2017	Ryan Moran	6–8	4–2	T–2nd	
2018	Ryan Moran	5–8	3–3	T–4th	
2019	Ryan Moran	7–9	2–4	T–5th	NCAA Division I First Round
2020	Ryan Moran	4–1	0–0	†	†
2021	Ryan Moran	8–3	7–2	T–1st	
2022	Ryan Moran	6–7	3–3	T–3rd	
2023	Ryan Moran	8–5	3–4	T–5th	
2024	Ryan Moran	5–7	4–3	T–3rd	
2025	Ryan Moran	7–5	5–1	T–1st	
Ryan Moran:		56–53 (.514)	31–22 (.585)		
Total:		389–345 (.530)			
National champion Postseason invitational champion Conference regular season champion Conference regular season and conference tournament champion Division regular season champion Division regular season and conference tournament champion Conference tournament champion

†NCAA canceled 2020 collegiate activities due to the COVID-19 virus.

== See also ==
- List of UMBC alumni for a list of notable former players.
