= Hartford Hawks men's lacrosse =

- Founded: 1979 (varsity), 1973 (club)
- University: University of Hartford
- Head coach: Kevin Sanna (1st season)
- Stadium: Al-Marzook Field at Alumni Stadium (capacity: 2,500)
- Location: Hartford, Connecticut
- Conference: Conference of New England
- Nickname: Hawks
- Colors: Scarlet and white

NCAA Tournament appearances
- 2011, 2016

Conference Tournament championships
- 2011, 2016

Conference regular season championships
- 2000, 2003

The Hartford Hawks men's lacrosse team represents the University of Hartford in National Collegiate Athletic Association (NCAA) Division III men's lacrosse. Hartford currently competes in the Conference of New England (CNE) and plays its home games at Al-Marzook Field at Alumni Stadium in Hartford, Connecticut.

Hartford had been an NCAA Division I member before starting a transition to Division III after the 2022 season. It had been a member of the America East Conference, and before that the Northeast Conference.

== History ==
=== 1973–1992 ===
Hartford men's lacrosse was established as a club sport in 1973 until it became a varsity program in 1979.

In 1985, Hartford hired John Herbert as head coach for the team's inaugural season in Division 1. Hartford competed as an independent until joining the Northeast Conference in 1993. As an independent team, Hartford had an overall record of 36–58.

=== 1993–2003 ===
In 1993, first-year head coach Jack McGetrick replaced Rob Quinn and led the team to its first winning season in eight years. In 1997, the Hartford Hawks joined the America East Conference. In 2000, the Hawks completed a 14–2 record and earned the NEC regular season title after completing a 4–1 conference record. In 2003, McGetrick once again led the Hawks to a regular season title after finishing the season with a 9–8 record and a 4–1 conference record. After 11 seasons with the Hawks, McGetrick stepped down from his head coaching duties finishing as the winningest lacrosse coach in the programs history. BlackJack returned in 2004 to coach his alumni to victory one last time over the current squad. A feat never accomplished and most likely never repeated. The game was played on the muddy practice field behind the 5’s so the lacrosse team didn’t ruin the field used by the university’s crown jewel soccer team.

=== 2004–2005 ===
Andy Towers replaced McGetrick as head coach for the 2004 season and led the Hawks to an unsuccessful 0–14 record. The following season, now under the helm of Bill Warder, ended in a disappointing 2–12 record.

=== 2006–2016 ===
In 2006, Peter Lawrence became head coach of the Hawks. In 2011, coming off seven straight losing seasons; the Hawks, led by Lawrence, would win their first conference tournament. Hartford also made their first NCAA tournament appearance in 2011 but lost in the first round to the second-seeded Cornell, 12–5. In 2016, the Hawks lost 14–9 against Quinnipiac in a play-in game in the 2016 NCAA tournament. Following the 2016 season, Peter Lawrence resigned as head coach of Hartford after 11 seasons.

=== 2017–present ===
After the departure of long time head coach Peter Lawrence; Hartford promoted assistant coach Ryan Martin to head coach. In his first season as head coach, Martin led the Hawks to a 6–8 overall record.

=== Division III ===
On May 6, 2021, the University of Hartford Board of Regents voted to drop its athletic department to Division III. The drop was set to take place no later than September 1, 2025. The school ultimately started its transition in July 2022 and started Division III competition in July 2023. The Hawks played the first season of their transition in spring 2023 as a Division I independent before joining CNE (then known as the Commonwealth Coast Conference) in July 2023.

== Annual record ==
Season	Coach	Overall	Conference	Standing	Postseason
Allan Wilson (Independent) (1979–1984)
1979	Allan Wilson	0–8			
1980	Allan Wilson	4–6			
1981	Allan Wilson	1–9			
1982	Allan Wilson	3–6			
1983	Allan Wilson	2–6			
1984	Allan Wilson	4–4			
Allan Wilson:		14–39			
John Herbert (Independent) (1985–1986)
Division I
1985	John Herbert	5–6			
1986	John Herbert	7–5			
John Herbert:		12–11			
Gus Mazzocca (Independent) (1987–1989)
1987	Gus Mazzocca	1–8			
1988	Gus Mazzocca	4–7			
1989	Gus Mazzocca	4–9			
Gus Mazzocca:		9–24			
Rob Quinn (Independent) (1990–1992)
1990	Rob Quinn	7–7			
1991	Rob Quinn	3–8			
1992	Rob Quinn	5–8	0–4		
Rob Quinn:		15–23	0–4		
Jack McGetrick (Northeast Conference/America East Conference) (1993–2003)
1993	Jack McGetrick	7–6	1–3		
1994	Jack McGetrick	3–10	1–3		
1995	Jack McGetrick	8–6	2–3		
1996	Jack McGetrick	9–6	2–3		
1997	Jack McGetrick	11–3	5–1		
1998	Jack McGetrick	3–11	1–4		
1999	Jack McGetrick	8–7	0–5		
2000	Jack McGetrick	14–2	4–1		
2001	Jack McGetrick	6–8	1–4		
2002	Jack McGetrick	9–7	4–1		
2003	Jack McGetrick	9–8	4–1		
Jack McGetrick:		87–74			
Andy Towers (America East) (2004–2004)
2004	Andy Towers	0–14	0–6		
Andy Towers:		0–14	0–6		
Bill Warder (America East) (2005–2005)
2005	Bill Warder	2–12	0–6		
Bill Warder:		2–12	0–6		
Peter Lawrence (America East) (2006–2016)
2006	Peter Lawrence	3–12	0–5	6th	
2007	Peter Lawrence	2–13	1–4	T–5th	
2008	Peter Lawrence	0–13	0–5	6th	
2009	Peter Lawrence	2–11	1–4		
2010	Peter Lawrence	4–10	1–4		
2011	Peter Lawrence	11–7	3–2	T–2nd	NCAA First Round
2012	Peter Lawrence	6–9	3–2		
2013	Peter Lawrence	7–7	4–1	T–2nd	
2014	Peter Lawrence	6–9	2–3		
2015	Peter Lawrence	7–8	3–3	4th	
2016	Peter Lawrence	11–7	3–3	4th	NCAA First Round
Peter Lawrence:		59–106	21–36		
Ryan Martin (America East) (2017–present)
2017	Ryan Martin	6–8	2–4	5th	
2018	Ryan Martin	3–10	0–5	7th	
2019	Ryan Martin	4–11	2–4	T–4th	
2020	Ryan Martin	3–3	0–0	†	†
2021	Ryan Martin	2–5	2–5	5th	
2022					
Ryan Martin (Division I Independent) (2023–2023)
2023	Ryan Martin	6–0			
Division III
Ryan Martin (Commonwealth Coast Conference) (2024–2024)
2024	Ryan Martin	6–7			
Ryan Martin (Conference of New England) (2025–present)
2025	Ryan Martin	10–7	6–2	T–1st	
2026	Ryan Martin	11–6	7–2	3rd	
Ryan Martin:		51–57			
Total:		249–360			
National champion Postseason invitational champion Conference regular season champion Conference regular season and conference tournament champion Division regular season champion Division regular season and conference tournament champion Conference tournament champion

†NCAA canceled 2020 collegiate activities due to the COVID-19 virus.
