= Johns Hopkins–Virginia lacrosse rivalry =

College sports rivalry

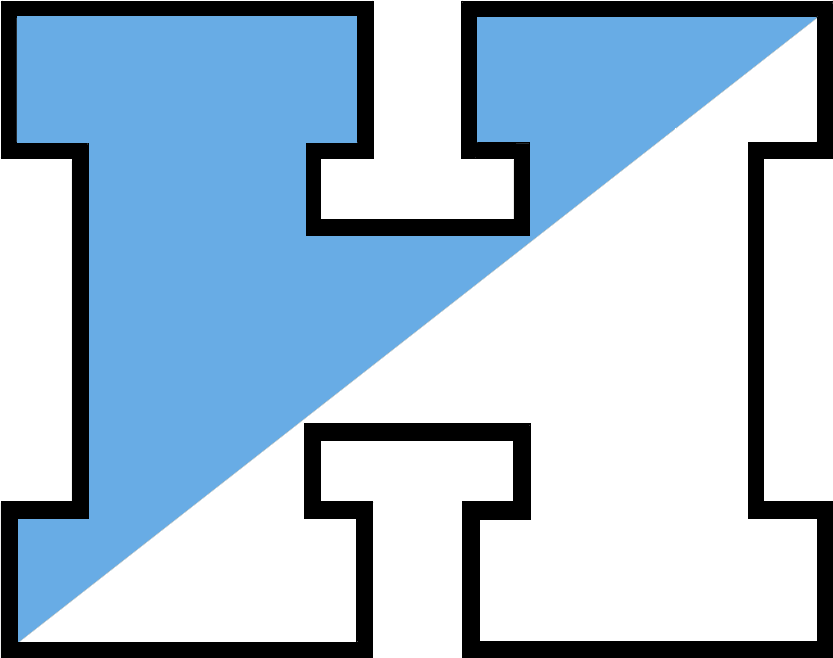
- Johns Hopkins Blue Jays Virginia Cavaliers
- First meeting: 1904; Johns Hopkins 9, Virginia 0
- Latest meeting: February 28, 2026; Johns Hopkins 14, Virginia 13
- Trophy: Doyle Smith Cup

Statistics
- Total meetings: 100
- All-time series: Johns Hopkins leads, 64–35–1
- Trophy series: Virginia leads, 11–7
- Largest victory: Johns Hopkins, 15–0 (1931)
- Longest win streak: Johns Hopkins, 10 (1904–1951, 1980–1986)
- Current win streak: Johns Hopkins, 2 (2025–Present)

The Johns Hopkins–Virginia lacrosse rivalry is an intercollegiate lacrosse rivalry between the Johns Hopkins Blue Jays and Virginia Cavaliers. The teams compete for the Doyle Smith Cup, which was first awarded in 2006. Edward Doyle Smith Jr., the only inductee to the U.S. Lacrosse Hall of Fame to have never competed in the sport, was a team manager and statistician at Johns Hopkins for five years before becoming UVA's first assistant sports information director, which he held for 31 seasons. Smith is also credited with the standardization of game statistics for lacrosse at the national level, twice receiving the USILA Man of the Year Award.

The rivalry features two of the three most dominant programs in lacrosse history, with the Jays and Cavaliers winning nine and seven national titles respectively since the creation of the NCAA Division I Men's Lacrosse Championship. The series has contained 16 NCAA postseason matchups, with Hopkins leading those matches 10–7. An annual fixture from 1948 to 2019, Johns Hopkins leads the series 62–35–1 through 2024 thanks largely to its early dominance, but Virginia has held the upper hand, 23–14, since 1994.

These rivals have met three times to decide national titles, with the Cavaliers defeating the Blue Jays for their first and third NCAA championships (in 1972 and in 2003) in hotly contested matches, and Johns Hopkins narrowly defeating Virginia in 1980 (in two overtimes) for their third consecutive and fourth overall NCAA championship.

== Series history ==
=== Pre-NCAA era (1900s to 1970s) ===
The teams first squared off in 1904, meeting twice during the season. At this time, lacrosse was not recognized as a varsity sport at Virginia. A 22 year gap would follow before playing again during the second "official" year of lacrosse for the Cavs. These six early games all resulted in large Hopkins victories, as the Jays outscored UVA by a margin of 72–4. The series would resume in 1948 and become an annual game. In 1952, the Cavaliers beat Hopkins for the first time, winning a narrow 13–12 game. Virginia would claim its first national championship that season, heralding the programs arrival at the top of the sport. After the win in Baltimore, the teams met the following season in Charlottesville for the inaugural match at home for the Cavs against the Jays. Virginia would again triumph, but would not notch another win until 1963. Through the 1969 season, the series was firmly under Hopkins' control, as they held a 24–3–1 advantage against their southern rival.

=== Increasing national significance (1970s to 1990s) ===
The 1972 season was a crucial one in the history of the rivalry. Hopkins had taken the regular season matchup but the teams would meet again for the first time in the NCAA Division I Championship. This would be one of an NCAA-record 16 games played between the programs in the tournament. This game would take place with high stakes as the second-ever national title championship. Led by head coach Glenn Thiel, the Cavaliers knocked off favored Johns Hopkins by a 13–12 score before 7,000 spectators at Byrd Stadium. Outshooting the Jays 44 to 33 over the course of the contest, Virginia led at halftime 7 to 5. After a strong third quarter by the Blue Jays, the Cavs used a five goal performance in the final 15 minutes to prevail. However, Jack Thomas had a chance to tie with 12 seconds remaining but JHU coach Bob Scott called time out with six seconds to go, costing the Jays' one-on-one opportunity. A key element of the bitterness felt by the defeated Hopkins players was that UVA should not have been selected for the tournament in the first place, as they had already lost thrice in the regular season, including to the Jays. The following year, the teams would again meet for a postseason rematch, this time won by Johns Hopkins in the Final Four, by way of four goals from Rick Kowalchuk and three from Franz Wittelsberger. The regular season meeting was also significant as the first between the schools when ranked #1 and #2, incidentally, in the inaugural year of the polls.

Another important period began in 1979, as JHU and UVA played in four consecutive tournaments. The 1979 contest went to Hopkins, as they surged for a seven goal third quarter to down UVA in the Final Four. The next year they met in the national title for the second time. This contest would go the way of JHU this time. In a thrilling affair, Hopkins won from a Jeff Harris finish after two overtimes, the only championship game to extend beyond a single overtime period in NCAA history. The 1981 and 1982 bouts would be similar affairs, as both Final Four games ended with four goal Hopkins victories. Three years later, JHU would again end the Cavaliers' season in the Final Four, overcoming an early 5 to 0 deficit. In 1988, UVA would end a six game postseason losing streak to Hopkins, upsetting them in the quarterfinals behind five Chase Monroe goals. A mid-game confrontation between Monroe and teammate Quint Kessenich, a future ESPN and ABC sports analyst, was also noted.

The Blue Jays generally held the advantage during this stretch of the rivalry's history, only dropping two games between UVA's 1972 title win and a 1987 regular season victory by Virginia. However, the series was a must-see fixture, with both teams ranked in the Top 10 of the polls, and often the Top 5. The first game since the introduction of the weekly polls in 1972 to not feature Top 10 teams was in 2004, in which Virginia entered the game ranked #17. Indeed, each game of the rivalry's modern history has occurred between two ranked teams, as of 2020.

=== Dom Starsia flips the narrative (1990s to 2010s) ===
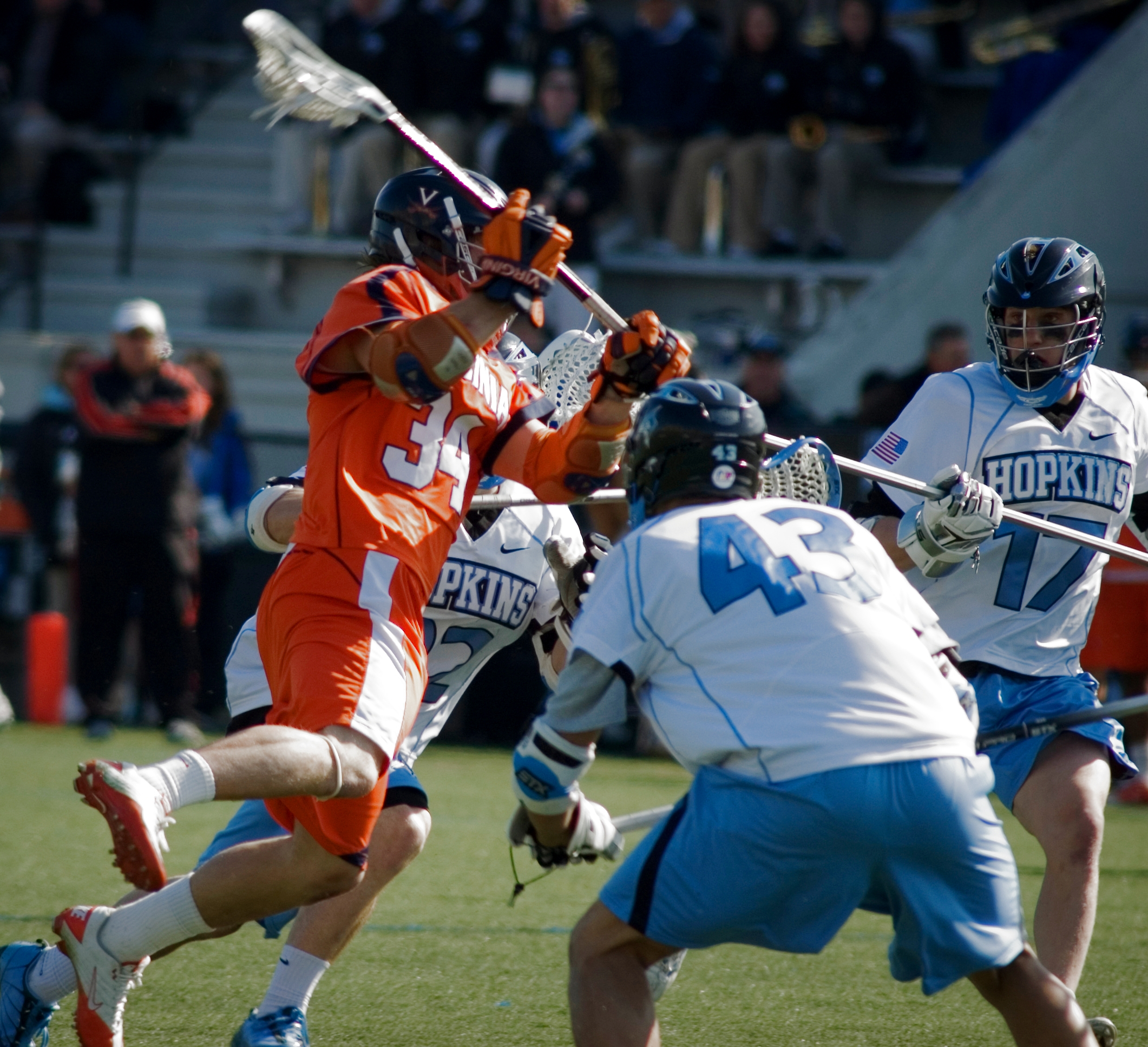
Virginia takes on rival Johns Hopkins

Legendary UVA head coach Dom Starsia arrived in Charlottesville by way of Brown in 1993. His first season ended the way of many recent Cavaliers teams – a loss to Hopkins in the postseason, this time in the quarterfinals. The next year, Starsia would earn his first against the Jays, one of 19 that he would notch against his Baltimore foe. His 19–13 record in the rivalry marks him as the only UVA coach to end his tenure with a winning percentage against JHU. In 1996, Starsia's Cavs, led by tournament Most Outstanding Player Michael Watson, downed Hopkins in the Final Four. The 1999 UVA team would win its first national championship in 27 years after beating the #2 Jays by a score of 16–10 in the Final Four. The Cavaliers would also triumph in each of the next three games, pushing their winning steak to a then-record four. In 2003, the two would square off in their first title game matchup since 1980. Playing at M&T Bank Stadium in Baltimore, #2 Virginia would beat #1 Johns Hopkins in their own backyard by a 9–7 score. Goalie Tillman Johnson, UVA's all-time saves leader at 204, was named tournament MOP after saving 13 Hopkins shots.

In addition to the annual regular season game, the programs would meet in two additional postseason games before the end of the decade. In the 2005 NCAA tournament, JHU would beat their rivals 9–8 in overtime to advance to the national title game, which they would win over Duke to claim their first championship in 18 years. Four years later, the Cavaliers routed Hopkins 19 to 8 behind five Shamel Bratton goals for the worst postseason defeat in Blue Jays history. Virginia advanced to their fourth Final Four in five years and secured the 300th career victory for Starsia. The first game played for the Doyle Smith Cup occurred in 2006, won by a 12–6 score by #1 Virginia. Since the introduction of the trophy, UVA leads the series 13 to 8. Beginning in this period, the increasing importance of recruiting rankings in collegiate lacrosse added a new dimension to the rivalry, due to the national brand presence for the historic powers.

=== Recent years (2010 to present) ===
In 2011, Johns Hopkins snapped a six game skid to Virginia with a 12–11 victory. One new element of the rivalry began in 2014, when attackman Wells Stanwick, younger brother of former Cavaliers star Steele Stanwick, signed with the Blue Jays. In both the 2014 and 2015 tournaments, unseeded Hopkins defeated the Cavaliers in Charlottesville in the first round. The 2014 postseason contest enabled JHU head coach Dave Pietramala to tie former coach Bob Scott for the most career victories at the university. In 2018, Hopkins overcame a seven goal halftime deficit to stun UVA at Klockner Stadium. The most recent meeting in 2019 was the 94th of the rivalry's history. A five goal victory for the Cavaliers stretched their recent advantage to 19 of the last 31 meetings. The Blue Jays ended the 2010s with a 7–5 advantage, including five overtime games in eight meetings with four straight in regular season games. In 2020, the series was scheduled for interruption for the first time since it became an annual fixture in 1948. After Johns Hopkins joined the Big Ten Conference for men's lacrosse in 2015, it has had increasing difficulty to maintain all of its historical rivalries in conjunction with a slate of conference games; Hopkins also had to temporarily cancel its series with Navy for the 2018 and 2019 seasons for similar reasons.

== Rival accomplishments ==
The following summarizes the accomplishments of the two programs.

Team	Johns Hopkins Blue Jays	Virginia Cavaliers
NCAA National Titles	9	7
Pre-NCAA National Titles	35	2
NCAA Final Four Appearances	29	24
NCAA Tournament Appearances	47	40
NCAA Tournament Record	71–38	55–33
NCAA Tournament Winning Percentage	.651	.625
Conference Tournament Titles	2	7
Conference Championships	1	25
Tewaarton Award Recipients	1	3
Lt. Raymond Enners Award Recipients	11	4
Consensus First Team All-Americans	184	70
All-time Program Record	993–346–15	661–372–6
All-time Winning Percentage	.739	.639

== Game results ==
Johns Hopkins victories	Virginia victories	Tie games

No.	Date	Location	Winner	Score
1	1904	Baltimore, MD	Johns Hopkins	9–0
2	1904	Baltimore, MD	Johns Hopkins	12–1
3	1926	Baltimore, MD	Johns Hopkins	11–1
4	1927	Baltimore, MD	Johns Hopkins	13–1
5	1928	Baltimore, MD	Johns Hopkins	12–1
6	1931	Baltimore, MD	Johns Hopkins	15–0
7	1948	Baltimore, MD	Johns Hopkins	15–5
8	1949	Baltimore, MD	Johns Hopkins	17–9
9	1950	Baltimore, MD	Johns Hopkins	15–6
10	1951	Baltimore, MD	Johns Hopkins	14–8
11	1952	Baltimore, MD	Virginia	13–12
12	1953	Charlottesville, VA	Virginia	15–8
13	1954	Baltimore, MD	Tie	8–8
14	1955	Charlottesville, VA	Johns Hopkins	23–9
15	1956	Baltimore, MD	Johns Hopkins	12–4
16	1957	Charlottesville, VA	Johns Hopkins	16–6
17	1958	Baltimore, MD	Johns Hopkins	16–6
18	1959	Charlottesville, VA	Johns Hopkins	12–4
19	1960	Baltimore, MD	Johns Hopkins	17–6
20	1961	Charlottesville, VA	Johns Hopkins	13–4
21	1962	Charlottesville, VA	Johns Hopkins	12–8
22	1963	Baltimore, MD	Virginia	10–7
23	1964	Charlottesville, VA	Johns Hopkins	15–5
24	1965	Baltimore, MD	Johns Hopkins	17–6
25	1966	Charlottesville, VA	Johns Hopkins	10–1
26	1967	Baltimore, MD	Johns Hopkins	10–3
27	1968	Charlottesville, VA	Johns Hopkins	17–9
28	1969	Baltimore, MD	Johns Hopkins	15–4
29	1970	Charlottesville, VA	Virginia	15–8
30	1971	Baltimore, MD	Virginia	9–8^{OT}
31	1972	Charlottesville, VA	Johns Hopkins	13–8
32	1972	College Park, MD; NCAA Championship Game	Virginia	13–12
33	1973	Baltimore, MD	#1 Johns Hopkins	14–9
34	1973	Baltimore, MD	#2 Johns Hopkins	12–9

No.	Date	Location	Winner	Score
35	1974	Charlottesville, VA	#3 Virginia	15–10
36	1975	Baltimore, MD	#1 Johns Hopkins	10–9^{2OT}
37	1976	Charlottesville, VA	#5 Johns Hopkins	14–9
38	1977	Baltimore, MD	#3 Johns Hopkins	15–9
39	1978	Charlottesville, VA	#2 Johns Hopkins	17–7
40	1979	Baltimore, MD	#1 Johns Hopkins	13–8
41	1979	Baltimore, MD	#1 Johns Hopkins	16–7
42	1980	Charlottesville, VA	#8 Virginia	12–9
43	1980	Ithaca, NY; NCAA Championship Game	#2 Johns Hopkins	9–8^{2OT}
44	1981	Baltimore, MD	#1 Johns Hopkins	15–13
45	1981	Baltimore, MD	#1 Johns Hopkins	10–6
46	1982	Charlottesville, VA	#2 Johns Hopkins	12–11^{OT}
47	1982	Baltimore, MD	#3 Johns Hopkins	13–9
48	1983	Baltimore, MD	#1 Johns Hopkins	12–6
49	1984	Charlottesville, VA	#2 Johns Hopkins	16–9
50	1985	Baltimore, MD	#1 Johns Hopkins	12–5
51	1985	Baltimore, MD	#1 Johns Hopkins	11–8
52	1986	Charlottesville, VA	#2 Johns Hopkins	8–7
53	1987	Baltimore, MD	#4 Virginia	9–7
54	1988	Charlottesville, VA	#6 Johns Hopkins	11–10
55	1988	Baltimore, MD	#9 Virginia	11–10^{OT}
56	1989	Baltimore, MD	#1 Johns Hopkins	12–3
57	1990	Charlottesville, VA	#6 Virginia	12–7
58	1991	Baltimore, MD	#5 Johns Hopkins	16–6
59	1992	Charlottesville, VA	#1 Virginia	15–9
60	1993	Baltimore, MD	#6 Johns Hopkins	11–9
61	1993	Baltimore, MD	#4 Johns Hopkins	14–10
62	1994	Charlottesville, VA	#5 Virginia	11–8
63	1995	Baltimore, MD	#2 Johns Hopkins	22–13
64	1996	Charlottesville, VA	#1 Virginia	14–9
65	1996	College Park, MD	#2 Virginia	16–10
66	1997	Baltimore, MD	#3 Virginia	16–12
67	1998	Charlottesville, VA	#6 Johns Hopkins	13–10
68	1999	Baltimore, MD	#3 Johns Hopkins	16–15

No.	Date	Location	Winner	Score
69	1999	College Park, MD	#3 Virginia	16–10
70	2000	Charlottesville, VA	#2 Virginia	16–8
71	2001	Baltimore, MD	#9 Virginia	9–8^{4OT}
72	2002	Charlottesville, VA	#4 Virginia	12–6
73	2003	Baltimore, MD	#4 Johns Hopkins	8–7
74	2003	Baltimore, MD; NCAA Championship Game	#2 Virginia	9–7
75	2004	Charlottesville, VA	#17 Virginia	9–8^{OT}
76	2005	Baltimore, MD	#1 Johns Hopkins	9–7
77	2005	Philadelphia, PA	#1 Johns Hopkins	9–8^{OT}
78	2006	Charlottesville, VA	#1 Virginia	12–6
79	2007	Baltimore, MD	#5 Virginia	7–5
80	2008	Charlottesville, VA	#2 Virginia	13–12^{OT}
81	2009	Baltimore, MD	#1 Virginia	16–15
82	2009	Annapolis, MD	#5 Virginia	19–8
83	2010	Charlottesville, VA	#1 Virginia	15–6
84	2011	Baltimore, MD	#11 Johns Hopkins	12–11
85	2012	Charlottesville, VA	#2 Johns Hopkins	11–10^{OT}
86	2013	Baltimore, MD	#10 Johns Hopkins	15–8
87	2014	Charlottesville, VA	#10 Virginia	11–10^{OT}
88	2014	Charlottesville, VA	#8 Johns Hopkins	14–8
89	2015	Baltimore, MD	#7 Virginia	16–15^{OT}
90	2015	Charlottesville, VA	#10 Johns Hopkins	19–7
91	2016	Charlottesville, VA	Virginia	13–12^{OT}
92	2017	Baltimore, MD	#18 Johns Hopkins	18–17^{OT}
93	2018	Charlottesville, VA	#9 Johns Hopkins	15–13
94	2019	Baltimore, MD	#9 Virginia	16–11
95	2022	Charlottesville, VA	#2 Virginia	19–8
96	2023	Baltimore, MD	#1 Virginia	18–13
97	2024	Charlottesville, VA	#7 Johns Hopkins	16–14
98	2024	Towson, MD	#5 Virginia	11–10^{2OT}
99	2025	Baltimore, MD	#7 Johns Hopkins	13–12
100	2026	Charlottesville, VA	#16 Johns Hopkins	14–13
Series: Johns Hopkins leads 64–35–1
