= Johns Hopkins–Princeton lacrosse rivalry =

College sports rivalry

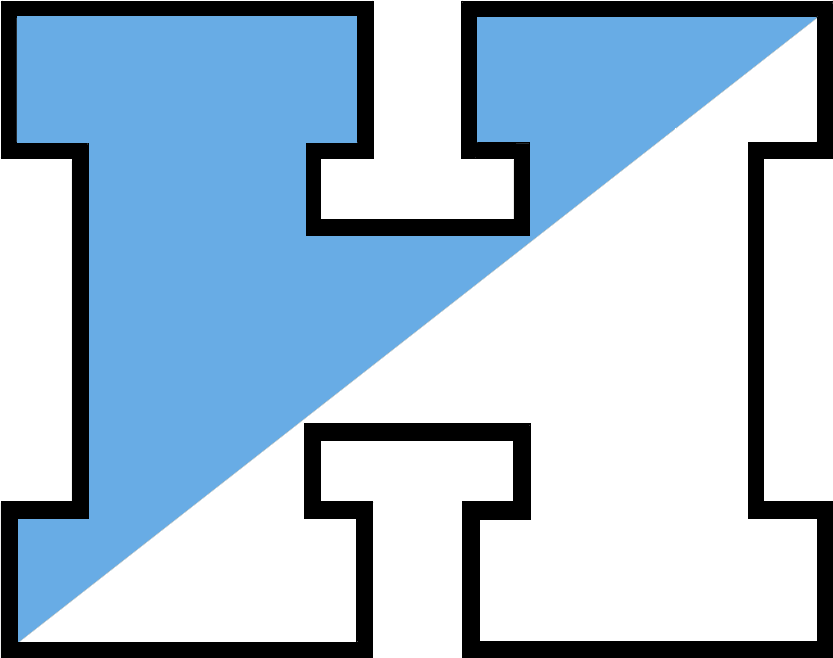
- Johns Hopkins Blue Jays Princeton Tigers
- First meeting: Unknown, 1890; Princeton 3, Johns Hopkins 2
- Latest meeting: February 29, 2020; Princeton 18, Johns Hopkins 11

Statistics
- Total meetings: 90
- All-time series: Johns Hopkins leads, 59–31
- Largest victory: Johns Hopkins, 24–3 (1959)
- Longest win streak: Johns Hopkins, 24 (1967–1990)
- Current win streak: Princeton, 1 (2020–present)

The Johns Hopkins–Princeton lacrosse rivalry is an intercollegiate lacrosse rivalry between the Johns Hopkins Blue Jays and Princeton Tigers. The teams first met in 1890 but would not meet again until 1930, after which, it became an annual staple on the schedule. Part of the enmity in the rivalry stems from the two school's similarities in high-level academics and lacrosse prominence, along with competing for a similar body of applicants. Through much of the latter half of the 20th century, Hopkins would dominate the rivalry. The series would resume national importance in the 1990s with the return of Princeton to the game's elite; since 1990, the Tigers have won six national championships and the Jays have claimed two. With the 90th meeting occurring in 2020, Johns Hopkins leads the series 59–31.

== Series history ==
=== Early years (1930s to 1960s) ===
While the series was first played in 1890, the teams would not meet for the second time until 1930, as Princeton dropped its team between 1890 and 1921. One of the most intriguing aspects of the early meetings were their influence on the distinctive black and blue colors of Hopkins. The school's original colors were black and gold, but Princeton's orange black uniforms made the two teams indistinguishable on the field, leading to the creation of Blue Jay blue.

After three more games, the series became an annual affair in 1937; its only blip being the 1944 season. In the 1937 contest, Princeton would triumph 7–4, winning their third national championship. Continued meetings would have significant national implications, as the teams competed as historic powers. After 23 meetings, Hopkins lead the series by a narrow 12–11 margin. However, after Princeton's one goal victory in 1956, Hopkins would win nine consecutive games until the Tigers topped the Jays in 1966.

=== Hopkins dominance (1960s through 1980s) ===
Hopkins continued to play at a high level in the 1960s, while Princeton began a slow descent after their Ivy League conference championship in 1967. That season, Johns Hopkins routed the Tigers 12 to 2 in Baltimore, the first of 24 straight victories over Princeton. The Tigers would only come within five goals of the Blue Jays once. Simultaneously, Hopkins dominated the new NCAA Division I tournament, winning seven national championships and appearing in nine more Final Fours. In contrast, blue-blooded Princeton had yet to make its first appearance in the 1980s, while failing to win their first Ivy League title since 1967.

=== National prominence (1990s to present) ===
After former Hobart Statesmen coach Jerry Schmidt did not succeed in returning the Tigers to their former glory, Bill Tierney was hired for the 1988 season. Despite a 2–13 record in his first season and a shutout loss to Hopkins, Tierney would breakthrough during his third year. The 1990 Tigers made their first NCAA appearance and end Hopkins' streak at 24 games, taking the postseason rematch in the tournament to advance to the quarterfinals. The following year, No. 5 Princeton would win for the second-straight year in Baltimore. In 1992, Hopkins would get revenge but Princeton would go on to win its first national title in 39 years.

The rivalry had regained its former prominence as the two teams, along with Syracuse and Virginia, would dominate the decade. Princeton would win five in this period, with Tierney grabbing a sixth in 2001. However, Hopkins would be unable to claim a title during the 1990s, their first decade without a championship since the 1880s. The rivalry was often played as the season opener for both teams during this period, described by Dave Pietramala as designed to "find out where you stand" and that "Everyone wonders, Why do you play Princeton the first game of the year? That is crazy. But hey, it's just as difficult for them to play Hopkins the first game of the year."

Princeton gained the upper-hand, winning 8 of 12 meetings between the two perennial Top 5 programs in the 90s, including a second NCAA tournament showdown in 1994. The Tigers would win a tense overtime match by a score of 12 to 11, en route to a second national championship. That victory marked the first for the Tigers in Princeton in 28 years. In 2002, Princeton would again knock the Jays from the tournament, prevailing over No. 1 Hopkins in the Final Four. However, Pietramala would lead the Jays to its first two national championships since 1987 in the next few years. The series would be relatively even during this era, with the 2000s ending with a narrow 6–5 advantage for Hopkins.

The departure of Tierney in 2009 marked another shift in the rivalry. Since his exit to Denver, Princeton has only managed two NCAA appearances, with none since 2010. Across the field, Johns Hopkins missed the tournament for the first time since the inaugural edition in 2013, a year in which they lost to No. 12 Princeton in Baltimore. Hopkins would only make it to one Final Four during the 2015 season, the same year that the Jays joined the Big Ten Conference. Despite the new conference membership and increasing difficulty in non-conference scheduling, they have maintained the annual rivalry with the Tigers. As of 2020, the programs have split the last ten meetings.

== Rival accomplishments ==
The following summarizes the accomplishments of the two programs.

| Team | Johns Hopkins Blue Jays | Princeton Tigers |
|---|---|---|
| Pre-NCAA National Titles | 35 | 6 |
| NCAA National Titles | 9 | 6 |
| NCAA Final Four Appearances | 29 | 10 |
| NCAA Tournament Appearances | 47 | 20 |
| NCAA Tournament Record | 71–38 | 30–14 |
| Conference Tournament Titles | 2 | 1 |
| Conference Championships | 1 | 27 |
| Tewaarton Award Recipients | 1 | 0 |
| Lt. Raymond Enners Award Recipients | 11 | 2 |
| Consensus First Team All-Americans | 184 | 78 |
| All-time Program Record | 993–346–15 | 721–502–18 |
| All-time Winning Percentage | .739 | .588 |

== Game results ==
| Johns Hopkins victories | Princeton victories | Tie games |

| No. | Date | Location | Winner | Score |
|---|---|---|---|---|
| 1 | Unknown, 1890 | Princeton, NJ | Princeton | 3–2 |
| 2 | Unknown, 1930 | Baltimore, MD | Johns Hopkins | 7–0 |
| 3 | Unknown, 1931 | Baltimore, MD | Johns Hopkins | 11–1 |
| 4 | Unknown, 1932 | Baltimore, MD | Johns Hopkins | 11–0 |
| 5 | Unknown, 1937 | Baltimore, MD | Princeton | 7–4 |
| 6 | Unknown, 1938 | Baltimore, MD | Princeton | 5–2 |
| 7 | Unknown, 1939 | Baltimore, MD | Princeton | 4–3 |
| 8 | Unknown, 1940 | Baltimore, MD | Johns Hopkins | 10–6 |
| 9 | Unknown, 1941 | Baltimore, MD | Johns Hopkins | 9–3 |
| 10 | Unknown, 1942 | Baltimore, MD | Princeton | 4–2 |
| 11 | Unknown, 1943 | Baltimore, MD | Johns Hopkins | 11–4 |
| 12 | Unknown, 1945 | Baltimore, MD | Johns Hopkins | 18–4 |
| 13 | Unknown, 1946 | Baltimore, MD | Princeton | 12–8 |
| 14 | Unknown, 1947 | Baltimore, MD | Johns Hopkins | 8–7 |
| 15 | Unknown, 1948 | Baltimore, MD | Johns Hopkins | 12–6 |
| 16 | Unknown, 1949 | Baltimore, MD | Johns Hopkins | 10–4 |
| 17 | Unknown, 1950 | Baltimore, MD | Johns Hopkins | 8–7 |
| 18 | Unknown, 1951 | Baltimore, MD | Princeton | 13–11 |
| 19 | Unknown, 1952 | Baltimore, MD | Princeton | 5–4 |
| 20 | Unknown, 1953 | Baltimore, MD | Johns Hopkins | 15–11 |
| 21 | Unknown, 1954 | Princeton, NJ | Princeton | 5–2 |
| 22 | April 23, 1955 | Baltimore, MD | Princeton | 6–5 |
| 23 | April 7, 1956 | Princeton, NJ | Princeton | 7–6 |
| 24 | April 13, 1957 | Baltimore, MD | Johns Hopkins | 19–6 |
| 25 | April 12, 1958 | Princeton, NJ | Johns Hopkins | 16–7 |
| 26 | April 11, 1959 | Baltimore, MD | Johns Hopkins | 24–3 |
| 27 | April 9, 1960 | Princeton, NJ | Johns Hopkins | 8–4 |
| 28 | April 8, 1961 | Baltimore, MD | Johns Hopkins | 19–6 |
| 29 | April 7, 1962 | Princeton, NJ | Johns Hopkins | 15–9 |
| 30 | April 6, 1963 | Baltimore, MD | Johns Hopkins | 15–8 |
| 31 | April 4, 1964 | Princeton, NJ | Johns Hopkins | 8–6 |

| No. | Date | Location | Winner | Score |
|---|---|---|---|---|
| 32 | April 3, 1965 | Baltimore, MD | Johns Hopkins | 10–6 |
| 33 | April 2, 1966 | Princeton, NJ | Princeton | 7–1 |
| 34 | April 1, 1967 | Baltimore, MD | Johns Hopkins | 12–2 |
| 35 | April 6, 1968 | Princeton, NJ | Johns Hopkins | 11–4 |
| 36 | April 5, 1969 | Baltimore, MD | Johns Hopkins | 12–9 |
| 37 | April 4, 1970 | Princeton, NJ | Johns Hopkins | 13–7 |
| 38 | April 3, 1971 | Baltimore, MD | Johns Hopkins | 13–8 |
| 39 | April 1, 1972 | Princeton, NJ | Johns Hopkins | 16–8 |
| 40 | March 31, 1973 | Baltimore, MD | No. 2 Johns Hopkins | 14–6 |
| 41 | March 30, 1974 | Princeton, NJ | No. 3 Johns Hopkins | 21–7 |
| 42 | April 5, 1975 | Baltimore, MD | No. 1 Johns Hopkins | 22–11 |
| 43 | April 3, 1976 | Princeton, NJ | No. 2 Johns Hopkins | 16–10 |
| 44 | April 2, 1977 | Baltimore, MD | No. 3 Johns Hopkins | 15–10 |
| 45 | April 1, 1978 | Princeton, NJ | No. 2 Johns Hopkins | 14–7 |
| 46 | March 31, 1979 | Baltimore, MD | No. 1 Johns Hopkins | 14–2 |
| 47 | March 29, 1980 | Manhasset, NY | No. 1 Johns Hopkins | 8–4 |
| 48 | March 28, 1981 | Baltimore, MD | Johns Hopkins | 19–4 |
| 49 | March 27, 1982 | Princeton, NJ | No. 2 Johns Hopkins | 13–5 |
| 50 | March 26, 1983 | Baltimore, MD | No. 1 Johns Hopkins | 12–6 |
| 51 | March 24, 1984 | Princeton, NJ | No. 2 Johns Hopkins | 16–6 |
| 52 | March 23, 1985 | Baltimore, MD | Johns Hopkins | 12–6 |
| 53 | March 22, 1986 | Princeton, NJ | Johns Hopkins | 19–7 |
| 54 | March 21, 1987 | Baltimore, MD | Johns Hopkins | 21–6 |
| 55 | March 26, 1988 | Princeton, NJ | No. 6 Johns Hopkins | 9–0 |
| 56 | March 25, 1989 | Baltimore, MD | No. 1 Johns Hopkins | 11–5 |
| 57 | March 2, 1990 | Baltimore, MD | Johns Hopkins | 20–8 |
| 58 | May 20, 1990 | Baltimore, MD | No. 11 Princeton | 9–8 |
| 59 | March 2, 1991 | Baltimore, MD | No. 5 Princeton | 15–10 |
| 60 | March 7, 1992 | Baltimore, MD | Johns Hopkins | 15–14 |
| 61 | March 6, 1993 | Baltimore, MD | No. 2 Princeton | 13–11 |
| 62 | March 5, 1994 | Baltimore, MD | No. 3 Princeton | 20–11 |

| No. | Date | Location | Winner | Score |
|---|---|---|---|---|
| 63 | May 21, 1994 | Princeton, NJ | No. 2 Princeton | 12–11^{OT} |
| 64 | March 4, 1995 | Baltimore, MD | No. 2 Johns Hopkins | 15–14 |
| 65 | March 2, 1996 | Baltimore, MD | No. 3 Princeton | 12–9 |
| 66 | March 1, 1997 | Princeton, NJ | No. 1 Princeton | 7–6^{OT} |
| 67 | February 28, 1998 | Baltimore, MD | No. 1 Princeton | 17–10 |
| 68 | March 6, 1999 | Princeton, NJ | No. 2 Johns Hopkins | 12–11 |
| 69 | March 4, 2000 | Baltimore, MD | No. 4 Princeton | 15–11 |
| 70 | March 3, 2001 | Princeton, NJ | No. 2 Princeton | 8–4 |
| 71 | March 2, 2002 | Baltimore, MD | No. 3 Johns Hopkins | 8–5 |
| 72 | May 25, 2002 | Piscataway, NJ | No. 4 Princeton | 11–9 |
| 73 | March 1, 2003 | Princeton, NJ | No. 3 Johns Hopkins | 10–8 |
| 74 | March 6, 2004 | Baltimore, MD | No. 1 Johns Hopkins | 14–5 |
| 75 | March 5, 2005 | Princeton, NJ | No. 1 Johns Hopkins | 9–6 |
| 76 | March 4, 2006 | Baltimore, MD | No. 10 Princeton | 6–4 |
| 77 | March 3, 2007 | Baltimore, MD | No. 9 Johns Hopkins | 7–6^{2OT} |
| 78 | March 1, 2008 | Baltimore, MD | No. 1 Johns Hopkins | 14–9 |
| 79 | February 28, 2009 | Baltimore, MD | No. 9 Princeton | 14–8 |
| 80 | March 6, 2010 | Baltimore, MD | No. 7 Princeton | 11–10^{OT} |
| 81 | March 5, 2011 | Baltimore, MD | No. 10 Princeton | 8–3 |
| 82 | March 2, 2012 | Princeton, NJ | No. 2 Johns Hopkins | 10–8 |
| 83 | March 1, 2013 | Baltimore, MD | No. 12 Princeton | 11–8 |
| 84 | March 1, 2014 | Princeton, NJ | No. 5 Johns Hopkins | 15–9 |
| 85 | February 28, 2015 | Baltimore, MD | No. 18 Princeton | 16–15 |
| 86 | March 5, 2016 | Baltimore, MD | No. 13 Johns Hopkins | 17–7 |
| 87 | March 3, 2017 | Princeton, NJ | Princeton | 18–7 |
| 88 | March 3, 2018 | Baltimore, MD | No. 19 Johns Hopkins | 16–9 |
| 89 | March 2, 2019 | Princeton, NJ | No. 18 Johns Hopkins | 14–12 |
| 90 | March 1, 2020 | Princeton, NJ | No. 8 Princeton | 18–11 |
Series: Johns Hopkins leads 59–31
