= Johns Hopkins–Syracuse lacrosse rivalry =

College sports rivalry

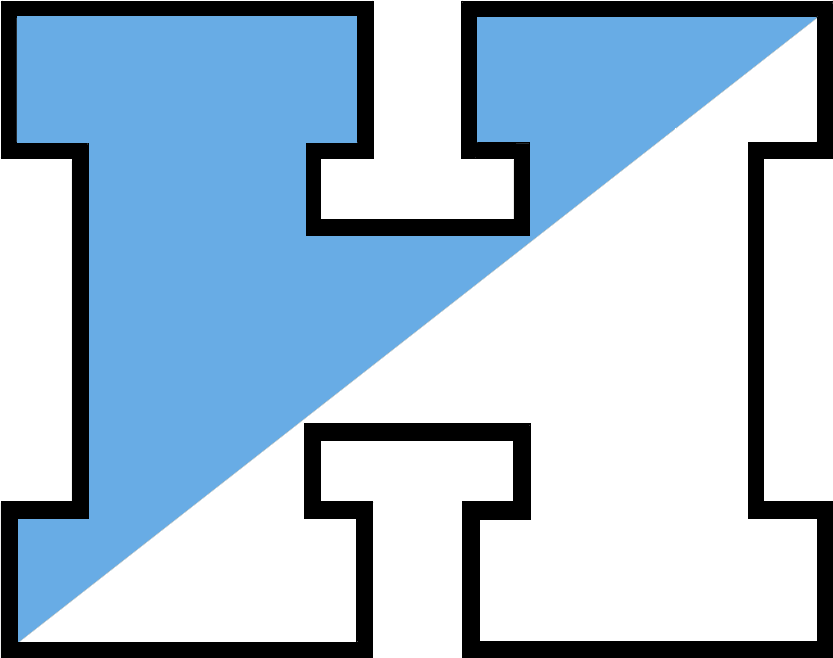
- Johns Hopkins Blue Jays Syracuse Orange
- First meeting: April 30, 1921; Johns Hopkins 4, Syracuse 4
- Latest meeting: March 7, 2026; Syracuse 12, Johns Hopkins 8

Statistics
- Total meetings: 64
- All-time series: Johns Hopkins leads, 32–31–1
- Largest victory: Johns Hopkins, 20–0 (1931)
- Longest win streak: Johns Hopkins, 9 (1930–1980)
- Current win streak: Syracuse, 3 (2024–present)

The Johns Hopkins–Syracuse lacrosse rivalry is an intercollegiate lacrosse rivalry between the Johns Hopkins Blue Jays and Syracuse Orange. The two programs are the most historically successful and winningest in collegiate lacrosse, combining for 60 national titles spanning the pre-NCAA and NCAA eras. Since the advent of the NCAA Division I Men's Lacrosse Championship, the Syracuse and Johns Hopkins have the first- and second-most titles respectively. Hopkins leads the series 32–30–1 through 2025.

== Series history ==
=== Early years and rise to prominence ===
The teams first met in 1921 after a hard-fought 4–4 draw. After several more contests in the 1920s and 1930s, they would not meet again until 1963, 29 years after their last meeting. The 60s resulted in five more Hopkins victories and the series did not develop sustained national significance until 1980. That season, the teams met in the NCAA Final Four, the first of 13 meetings between the two in the tournament. The Blue Jays won that initial postseason matchup 18 to 11 en route to its third consecutive national championship. Syracuse would grab its first victory since 1922 with a title showdown three years later, the first national title for the Orange since 1957. The teams would meet again the following year in the championship, with Hopkins prevailing 13–10. After this streak of significant matchups, the two athletics programs scheduled an annual game in the regular season, which has continued uninterrupted to this day. Following that Jays victory, Hopkins again prevailed in the third consecutive title game between the two in a strong 11–4 showing. 1986 snapped the streak of postseason meetings and Hopkins' nine consecutive title game trips, as both teams were felled in the Final Four. Syracuse took three of the next four meetings before the two capped the decade with a classic title game in 1989. The Orange defeated the Jays 13–12 behind the Gaits brothers Paul and Gary. The programs would meet again in the postseason in following years, with Syracuse taking four out of five contests in the 1990s and early 2000s. After splitting the 90s with six wins apiece, the Jays would win seven of the next twelve prior to 2008. Hopkins and the Orange would square off in the 2008 title game, the first between the two since 1989. The fifth game featured the Orange claiming their tenth NCAA title. Beginning with the 2008 season, Syracuse won eight of nine contests in a dominant stretch.

=== Recent years (2010s to present) ===
The two programs, long proudly independent, would react to changing conditions in the collegiate lacrosse landscape during the 2010s. The significance of conference postseason tournaments in obtaining postseason bids, along with primary conference obligations for the Orange, led both to give up their independence. Syracuse joined its primary home, the Big East Conference in 2010, before lateraling to the ACC in 2014. Hopkins began exploring membership possibilities in 2013 after missing its first NCAA tournament since the inaugural contest, which broke the longest streak in history at 41 straight seasons. In 2013, the university announced that Hopkins would join the newly formed Big Ten Conference as an affiliate member for lacrosse, beginning with the 2015 season. On the field, Hopkins would snap the aforementioned Syracuse streak with a victory in the quarterfinals of the 2015 NCAA Division I Men's Lacrosse Championship. The teams split the next four before Syracuse took the first contest of the 2020s with a 15–9 victory in Baltimore.

== Rival accomplishments ==
The following summarizes the accomplishments of the two programs.

Team	Johns Hopkins Blue Jays	Syracuse Orange
Pre-NCAA National Titles	35	5
NCAA National Titles	9	11*
NCAA Final Four Appearances	29	27*
NCAA Tournament Appearances	47	38*
NCAA Tournament Record	71–38	68–27*
Conference Tournament Titles	2	4
Conference Championships	2	5
Tewaarton Award Recipients	1	3
Lt. Raymond Enners Award Recipients	11	7
Consensus First Team All-Americans	184	100
All-time Program Record	993–356–15	917–352–16
All-time Winning Percentage	.739	.720

- Due to NCAA violations, Syracuse was forced to vacate its 1990 NCAA title and tournament appearance.

== Game results ==
Johns Hopkins victories	Syracuse victories	Tie games

No.	Date	Location	Winner	Score
1	1921	Syracuse, NY	Tie	4–4
2	1922	Baltimore, MD	Syracuse	3–1
3	1930	Syracuse, NY	Johns Hopkins	8–2
4	1931	Baltimore, MD	Johns Hopkins	20–0
5	1934	Baltimore, MD	Johns Hopkins	11–6
6	1963	Baltimore, MD	Johns Hopkins	10–7
7	1965	Syracuse, NY	Johns Hopkins	21–6
8	1966	Baltimore, MD	Johns Hopkins	14–1
9	1967	Syracuse, NY	Johns Hopkins	17–9
10	1968	Baltimore, MD	Johns Hopkins	20–7
11	1980	Baltimore, MD	#2 Johns Hopkins	18–11
12	1983	New Brunswick, NJ	#2 Syracuse	17–16
13	1984	Newark, DE	#1 Johns Hopkins	13–10
14	1985	Baltimore, MD	Johns Hopkins	8–6
15	1985	Providence, RI	#1 Johns Hopkins	11–4
16	1986	Baltimore, MD	Syracuse	11–10
17	1987	Syracuse, NY	Syracuse	15–14
18	1988	Baltimore, MD	Syracuse	19–7
19	1989	Baltimore, MD	Johns Hopkins	14–13
20	1989	College Park, MD	#1 Syracuse	13–12
21	1990	Syracuse, NY	#1 Syracuse	18–10
22	1991	Syracuse, NY	#7 Johns Hopkins	18–12

No.	Date	Location	Winner	Score
23	1991	Baltimore, MD	#5 Syracuse	11–8
24	1992	Baltimore, MD	Johns Hopkins	15–14
25	1992	Philadelphia, PA	#1 Syracuse	21–16
26	1993	Syracuse, NY	#3 Syracuse	21–17
27	1994	Baltimore, MD	#4 Johns Hopkins	19–14
28	1995	Syracuse, NY	#2 Johns Hopkins	14–13^{OT}
29	1996	Baltimore, MD	#7 Johns Hopkins	14–10
30	1997	Syracuse, NY	#3 Syracuse	14–13
31	1998	Baltimore, MD	#1 Syracuse	14–13
32	1999	Baltimore, MD	#5 Johns Hopkins	12–10
33	2000	Syracuse, NY	#1 Syracuse	13–12
34	2000	College Park, MD	#1 Syracuse	14–12
35	2001	Syracuse, NY	#9 Johns Hopkins	11–10
36	2002	Baltimore, MD	#2 Johns Hopkins	9–8
37	2003	Syracuse, NY	#4 Syracuse	15–14
38	2003	Baltimore, MD	#1 Johns Hopkins	19–8
39	2004	Baltimore, MD	#1 Johns Hopkins	17–5
40	2004	Baltimore, MD	#4 Syracuse	15–9
41	2005	Syracuse, NY	#1 Johns Hopkins	12–11^{OT}
42	2006	Baltimore, MD	#13 Johns Hopkins	14–9
43	2006	Stony Brook, NY	#7 Syracuse	13–12
44	2007	Syracuse, NY	#3 Johns Hopkins	17–9

No.	Date	Location	Winner	Score
45	2008	Baltimore, MD	#5 Syracuse	14–13^{OT}
46	2008	Foxborough, MA	#3 Syracuse	13–10
47	2009	Syracuse, NY	#2 Syracuse	14–11
48	2010	Baltimore, MD	#2 Syracuse	10–7
49	2011	Syracuse, NY	#1 Syracuse	5–4^{2OT}
50	2012	Baltimore, MD	#2 Johns Hopkins	11–7
51	2013	Syracuse, NY	#11 Syracuse	13–8
52	2014	Baltimore, MD	#10 Syracuse	12–10
53	2015	Syracuse, NY	#1 Syracuse	13–10
54	2015	Annapolis, MD	#10 Johns Hopkins	16–15
55	2016	Baltimore, MD	#8 Johns Hopkins	11–10^{OT}
56	2017	Baltimore, MD	#6 Syracuse	8–7^{OT}
57	2018	Baltimore, MD	#15 Johns Hopkins	18–7
58	2019	Syracuse, NY	#15 Syracuse	14–10
59	2020	Baltimore, MD	#1 Syracuse	15–9
60	2022	Baltimore, MD	#19 Johns Hopkins	10–7
61	2023	Syracuse, NY	#10 Johns Hopkins	11–9
62	2024	Charlotte, NC	#9 Syracuse	14–13
63	2025	Syracuse, NY	#11 Syracuse	13–10
64	2026	Baltimore, MD	#10 Syracuse	12–8
Series: Johns Hopkins leads 32–31–1
