= Henry Ciccarone =

American college lacrosse coach (1938–1988)

- Ciccarone (left) and assistant Don Zimmerman (right) instruct Johns Hopkins players

Biographical details
- Born: February 8, 1938; Annapolis, Maryland, U.S.
- Died: November 16, 1988 (aged 50); Cockeysville, Maryland, U.S.

Playing career
- 1960–1962: Johns Hopkins Blue Jays men's lacrosse Johns Hopkins Blue Jays football
- Positions: Midfielder; Tailback

Coaching career (HC unless noted)

Lacrosse:
- 1963–1969: Johns Hopkins (asst.)
- 1975–1983: Johns Hopkins

Basketball:
- 1963–1969: Johns Hopkins

Football:
- 1963–1969: Johns Hopkins (asst.)

Head coaching record
- Overall: Lacrosse: 105–16; Basketball: 35–68

Accomplishments and honors

Championships
- 1978 NCAA National Championship; 1979 NCAA National Championship; 1980 NCAA National Championship

Henry A. "Chic" Ciccarone (February 8, 1938 – November 16, 1988) was an American college lacrosse coach. He was the head coach of the lacrosse team at Johns Hopkins University from 1975 to 1983 during which time he amassed a 105–16 record, including an undefeated record in 1979. Ciccarone guided the Blue Jays to three consecutive national championships from 1978 to 1980. He was inducted into the National Lacrosse Hall of Fame in 1987.

== Early life and college ==
Ciccarone attended St. Mary's High School and later transferred to the Severn School. He played varsity lacrosse as a midfielder at both institutions, and earned All-State honors in 1956. Ciccarone then attended college at Johns Hopkins University where he continued playing the sport. The United States Intercollegiate Lacrosse Association named him to the All-America third team in 1960, the second team in 1961, and the first team in 1962. As a senior in 1962, he served as the team captain and participated in the North/South Collegiate All-Star Game.

In addition to playing for the lacrosse team, Ciccarone played tailback for the football team, rushing for over 1,000 yards and passing for over 1,000 yards.

== Coaching career ==
Ciccarone began his coaching career in 1963 as an assistant lacrosse coach at Johns Hopkins, and continued in that role through 1969. He also served as an assistant football coach during that period, and as the head basketball coach from the 1963–64 season through the 1968–69 season. His basketball teams compiled a 35–68 record.

In 1975, Ciccarone became the head coach of the Johns Hopkins lacrosse team. He led Hopkins to the NCAA tournament all nine years of his tenure, and to the championship game seven consecutive times from 1977 to 1983. Ciccarone guided the Blue Jays to the NCAA championship in three consecutive seasons, from 1978 to 1980, which made him the first coach to accomplish that feat.

After defeating Maryland, 15–9, in the 1979 championship final to preserve a perfect 13–0 season, Ciccarone said, "I think you have to call this the greatest Johns Hopkins lacrosse team ever." Sports Illustrated writer Joe Marshall responded, "It might be easier to name the most beautiful Miss America." In the second edition of Lacrosse: Technique and Tradition by Bob Scott and Dave Pietramala, Ciccarone was referred to as "one of the finest coaches in the history of lacrosse."

Don Zimmerman played under Ciccarone in 1975 and 1976, and later served as his assistant coach. Zimmerman took over as Johns Hopkins head coach upon Ciccarone's retirement and led Hopkins to three national championships in his own right.

== Later life ==
In 1983, Ciccarone retired from coaching with a 105–16 career record and entered private business. He became the president of Bestway Distributing Company, where he worked until his death. Ciccarone died of a heart attack on November 16, 1988, at his home in Cockeysville, Maryland, at the age of 50. He was married and had four sons: Brent, Henry Jr., John, and Steve, all of whom also played lacrosse at Johns Hopkins.

The National Lacrosse Hall of Fame inducted Ciccarone in 1987. The Anne Arundel County Sports Hall of Fame inducted him in 2000.

The Henry Ciccarone Center for the Prevention of Heart Disease at the Johns Hopkins Hospital was named in his honor by Dr. Roger Blumenthal, who was an assistant sports information director during Ciccarone's tenure.

== Head coaching record ==
Record table
Season	Team	Overall	Conference	Standing	Postseason
Johns Hopkins Blue Jays (NCAA independent) (1975–1983)
1975	Johns Hopkins	9–2			NCAA Division I quarterfinals
1976	Johns Hopkins	9–4			NCAA Division I semifinals
1977	Johns Hopkins	11–2			NCAA Division I runner-up
1978	Johns Hopkins	13–1			NCAA Division I champion
1979	Johns Hopkins	13–0			NCAA Division I champion
1980	Johns Hopkins	14–1			NCAA Division I champion
1981	Johns Hopkins	13–1			NCAA Division I runner-up
1982	Johns Hopkins	11–3			NCAA Division I runner-up
1983	Johns Hopkins	12–2			NCAA Division I runner-up
Total:		105–16 (.868)			
National champion Postseason invitational champion Conference regular season champion Conference regular season and conference tournament champion Division regular season champion Division regular season and conference tournament champion Conference tournament champion
