= Marc Pion =

Canadian lacrosse player

Personal information
- Nationality: Canadian
- Born: 3 April 1996 (age 30) Montreal, Quebec
- Height: 6 ft 0 in (183 cm)
- Weight: 195 lb (88 kg; 13 st 13 lb)

Sport
- Position: Defense / Midfield
- Shoots: Left
- Coached by: McGill University
- NCAA team: Harvard University; Johns Hopkins University
- NLL draft: 59th overall, 2020; Philadelphia Wings

Career highlights
- 2018 Big Ten Champion; Academic All-Big Ten

Marc-Antoine Pion-Frégeau (born 3 April 1996) is a Canadian former professional lacrosse player with the Philadelphia Wings of the National Lacrosse League (NLL). He played collegiately for Harvard University and Johns Hopkins University before being drafted by Philadelphia in the fourth round, 59th overall, in the 2020 NLL Entry Draft.

== Playing career ==
=== Early career ===
Pion was born in Montréal, Quebec, and attended Collège Jean-de-Brebeuf. During international competition, he gained recognition as one of Canada's leading defensemen. He then spent two years at IMG Academy in Bradenton, Florida, where he was named a USA Lacrosse All-American and Under Armour All-American. In 2014, he committed to Harvard University.

=== Collegiate ===
In 2015, Pion joined the Harvard Crimson, becoming the first Québécois NCAA Division I lacrosse player. He was ranked the #51 freshman and #13 defenseman in the nation. After suffering repeated season-ending injuries, he maintained three years of NCAA eligibility.

After Harvard, Pion played two seasons for the Johns Hopkins University Blue Jays, appearing in 14 games and winning the 2018 Big Ten Championship. At Johns Hopkins, he was named a two-time Academic All-Big Ten honoree and Presidential Fellow.

=== Professional ===
Pion was selected in the fourth round, 59th overall by the Philadelphia Wings in the 2020 NLL Entry Draft. He signed an entry-level contract with the Wings in October 2020. He then re-signed with the Wings for a one-year contract in June 2021 and was selected to the Wings' final roster following training camp.

He has served as Assistant Coach of the McGill University men's lacrosse team since 2023.

== Personal life ==
In 2024, it was announced that he was elected a Senior Researcher and Honorary Fellow of the Policy Insights Forum, a Canadian think tank. He also serves as Vice President of Corporate Affairs for NATO's Transatlantic Emerging Leaders program.
