= Johns Hopkins Blue Jays men's lacrosse =

Intercollegiate lacrosse team of Johns Hopkins University

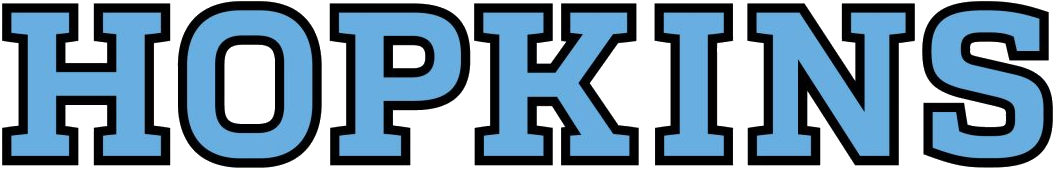
- Founded: 1883; 143 years ago
- University: Johns Hopkins University
- Head coach: Peter Milliman (since 2021 season)
- Stadium: Homewood Field (capacity: 8,500)
- Location: Baltimore, Maryland
- Conference: Big Ten
- Nickname: Blue Jays
- Colors: Hopkins blue and black

Pre-NCAA era championships
- (35) - 1891, 1898, 1899, 1900, 1902, 1903, 1906, 1907, 1908, 1909, 1911, 1913, 1915, 1918, 1919, 1922, 1923, 1924, 1926, 1927, 1928, 1932, 1933, 1934, 1941, 1947, 1948, 1949, 1950, 1957, 1959, 1967, 1968, 1969, 1970

NCAA Tournament championships
- (9) - 1974, 1978, 1979, 1980, 1984, 1985, 1987, 2005, 2007

NCAA Tournament Runner-Up
- (9) - 1972, 1973, 1977, 1981, 1982, 1983, 1989, 2003, 2008

NCAA Tournament Final Fours
- (29) - 1972, 1973, 1974, 1976, 1977, 1978, 1979, 1980, 1981, 1982, 1983, 1984, 1985, 1986, 1987, 1989, 1992, 1993, 1995, 1996, 1999, 2000, 2002, 2003, 2004, 2005, 2007, 2008, 2015

NCAA Tournament Quarterfinals
- (45) - 1972, 1973, 1974, 1975, 1976, 1977, 1978, 1979, 1980, 1981, 1982, 1983, 1984, 1985, 1986, 1987, 1988, 1989, 1991, 1992, 1993, 1994, 1995, 1996, 1997, 1998, 1999, 2000, 2001, 2002, 2003, 2004, 2005, 2006, 2007, 2008, 2009, 2011, 2012, 2014, 2015, 2018, 2023, 2024, 2026

NCAA Tournament appearances
- (50) - 1972, 1973, 1974, 1975, 1976, 1977, 1978, 1979, 1980, 1981, 1982, 1983, 1984, 1985, 1986, 1987, 1988, 1989, 1990, 1991, 1992, 1993, 1994, 1995, 1996, 1997, 1998, 1999, 2000, 2001, 2002, 2003, 2004, 2005, 2006, 2007, 2008, 2009, 2010, 2011, 2012, 2014, 2015, 2016, 2017, 2018, 2019, 2023, 2024, 2026

Conference Tournament championships
- (2) - 2015, 2018

Conference regular season championships
- (4) - 2015, 2023, 2024, 2026

The Johns Hopkins Blue Jays men's lacrosse team represents Johns Hopkins University in National Collegiate Athletic Association (NCAA) Division I college lacrosse. Since 2015, the Blue Jays have represented the Big Ten Conference.

== Overview ==
The team was founded in 1883 and is the school's most prominent sports team. The Blue Jays have won forty-four national championships including nine NCAA Division I titles (2007, 2005, 1987, 1985, 1984, 1980, 1979, 1978, 1974), twenty-nine USILL/USILA titles, and six ILA titles, first all time by any college lacrosse team and second to Syracuse in NCAA era national titles.

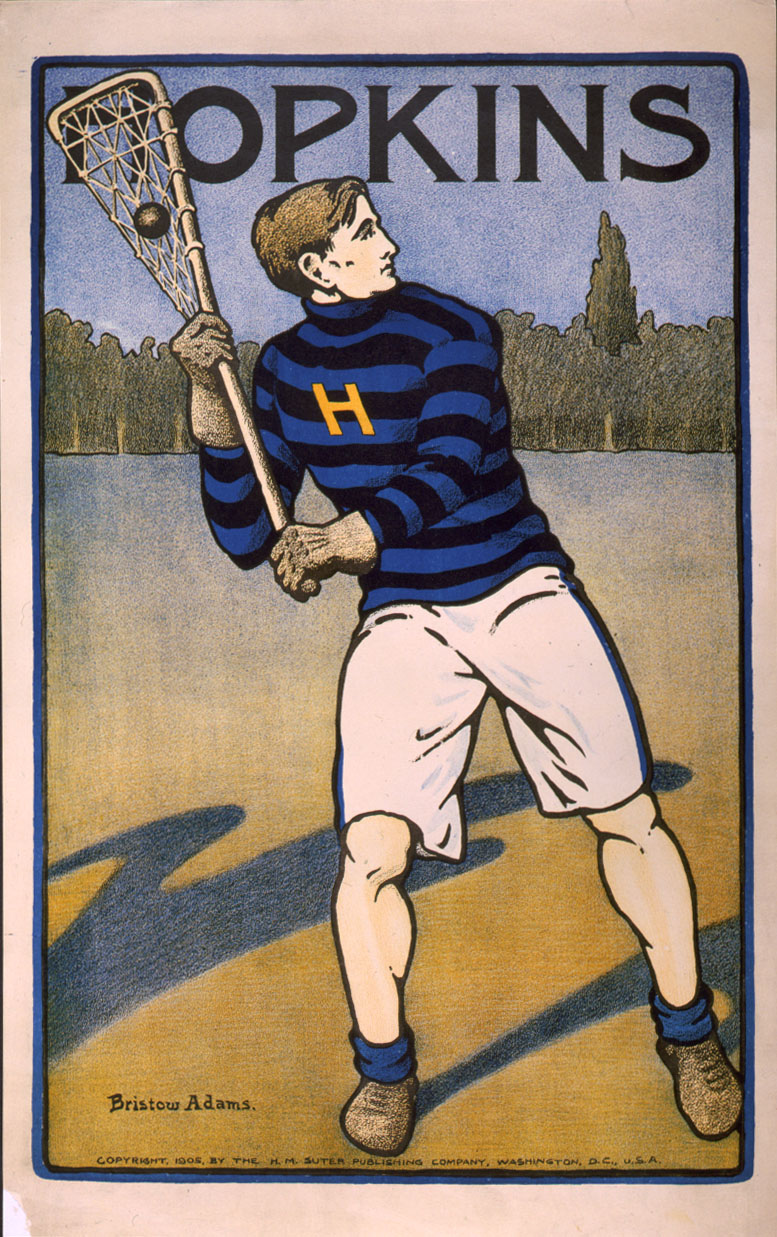
Hopkins lacrosse player, poster by Bristow Adams, 1905

Hopkins competes with Maryland in college lacrosse's most historic rivalry, the two teams having met more than 100 times, both joining the Big Ten Conference in the 2014–2015 season. They have competed annually since 2015 for "The Rivalry Trophy", a large wooden crab. The Blue Jays also consider Princeton and Syracuse, their top competitors for the national title in the NCAA era, as significant rivals, and play Loyola in the cross-town "Charles Street Massacre". Another heated rivalry is with Virginia with whom Hopkins has competed annually for the Doyle Smith Cup which was first awarded in 2006. In-state opponents include Towson, University of Maryland, Baltimore County and Navy.

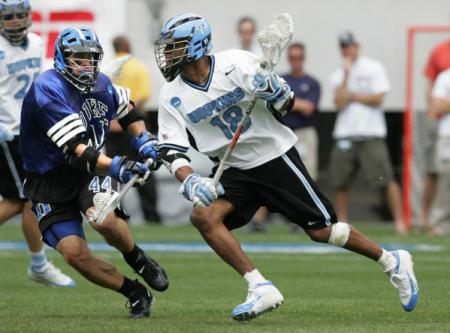
Johns Hopkins midfielder Kyle Harrison playing against Duke

In the past, the Johns Hopkins lacrosse teams have represented the United States in international competition. Johns Hopkins represented the United States in the 1928 Summer Olympics in Amsterdam and 1932 Summer Olympics in Los Angeles where lacrosse was a demonstration sport, winning the tournament in 1932. Additionally, they won the 1974 World Lacrosse Championship in Melbourne, Australia, where they represented the United States.

In late 2012, the men's and women's lacrosse team facilities moved into the Cordish Lacrosse Center, located at the Charles Street (south) end of Homewood Field.

The Blue Jays were not selected for the 2013 NCAA tournament, the first such occurrence since 1971.

On May 17, 2013, President Ronald Daniels announced in an open letter to the Hopkins community that he was accepting the positive recommendation of a committee empaneled to explore seeking conference affiliation for the team.

On June 3, 2013, the university announced that the team would join a "newly formulated" Big Ten as an affiliate member for lacrosse, effective in the 2014–2015 season. This conference will consist of Hopkins, Maryland, Michigan, Ohio State, Penn State and Rutgers. On May 2, 2015, the Blue Jays won the inaugural Big Ten men's lacrosse championship, defeating the Ohio State Buckeyes 13–6.

Up until 2016 the Lacrosse Museum and National Hall of Fame, governed by US Lacrosse, was located on the Homewood campus adjacent to Homewood Field, the home for both the men's and women's lacrosse teams. It is currently located at the US Lacrosse headquarters in Sparks, Maryland.

== Championships ==
Starting in 1926, the United States Intercollegiate Lacrosse Association (USILA) began rating college lacrosse teams and awarding gold medals to the top teams. Johns Hopkins was the recipient of three of these, including in 1928 alongside Maryland, Navy, and Rutgers—each of which had only one regular-season collegiate defeat. From 1936 through 1970, the USILA awarded the Wingate Memorial Trophy to the annual champion based on regular-season records. In 1971, the NCAA began hosting an annual men's tournament to determine the national champion. The Wingate Memorial Trophy was presented to the first two NCAA Division I champions (1971 and 1972) and was then retired.

== Men's lacrosse highlights ==
Team awards and honors
970	All-time wins (329 losses, 15 ties) (.746)
44	National Championship titles (all-time)
9	NCAA Division I Championships
29	USILL Titles (12), USILA titles (14) and consensus claims (3)
6	ILA titles
1	World Lacrosse Championship (1974)
2	U.S. Olympic teams (1928, 1932)
41	Consecutive NCAA tournament appearances (1972–2012)
18	NCAA National Championship game appearances
12	Undefeated seasons
Individual awards and honors
65	National Lacrosse Hall of Fame members
580	All Americans (from 1922–2015)
182	First Team All Americans (from 1922–2015)
11	Enners Award winners (player)
1	Tewaaraton Trophy winner (player)
15	Turnbull Award winners (attackman)
7	McLaughlin Award winners (midfielder)
15	Schmeisser Award winners (defenseman)
14	Kelly Award winners (goalie)
4	Touchstone Award winners (coach)

== Johns Hopkins University men's highlights ==
Career leaders are taken from the updated Johns Hopkins Record Book.

=== Career goal leaders ===
Name	Years	Goals	Name	Years	Goals
Terry Riordan	1992–95	184 ^{[a]}	Dan Denihan	1996–00	104
Garrett Degnon	2019–24	162	Jack Thomas	1972–74	103
Ryan Brown	2013–16	159	Cole Williams	2017–21	102
Brian Piccola	1991–95	154	Mike Morrill	1985–88	102
Franz Wittelsberger	1973–76	151	Richie Hirsch	1974–77	101
Michael O'Neill	1975–78	138	Conor Ford	2001–04	101
Jeff Cook	1979–82	128	Joey Epstein	2019–22	102
Bobby Benson	2000–03	124	Dave Huntley	1976–79	100
Paul Rabil	2005–08	111	Brian Wood	1984–87	100
Kevin Huntley	2005–08	109	Delverne Dressel	1983–86	99
Brandon Benn	2011–14	109	Peter Scott	1981–84	99
Kyle Marr	2016–19	107	Dylan Schlott	1996–99	97
Bill Morrill	1957–59	107			

^{[a]} 16th on the NCAA career goals list

=== Career assist leaders ===
Name	Years	Assists	Name	Years	Assists
Dave Marr	1993–96	134	Brian Wood	1984–87	78
Jacob Angelus	2020–24	125	Delverne Dressel	1983–86	75
Wells Stanwick	2012–15	124	Matt Panetta	1988–91	71
Joe Cowan	1967–69	123	Franz Wittelsberger	1973–76	69
Jack Thomas	1972–74	121	Zach Palmer	2010–2013	69
Mickey Webster	1957–59	105	Steven Boyle	2007–10	69
Richie Hirsch	1974–77	103	Paul Rabil	2005–08	67
Shack Stanwick	2015–18	117	Bill Morrill	1957–59	67
Michael O'Neill	1975–78	99	Michael Kimmel	2007–10	66
Dan Denihan	1996-00	99	Connor DeSimone	2018–22	63
Jeff Cook	1979–82	91	Terry Riordan	1992–95	63
Brian Piccola	1991–95	91	Conor Ford	2001–04	59
Kevin Boland	2001–04	82	Peter LeSueur	2002–05	59

=== Career points leaders ===
Name	Years	Points	Name	Years	Points
Terry Riordan	1992–95	247	Garrett Degnon	2019–24	184
Brian Piccola	1991–95	245	Paul Rabil	2005–08	178
Michael O'Neill	1975–78	237	Brian Wood	1984–87	178
Jack Thomas	1972–74	224	Delverne Dressel	1983–86	174
Franz Wittelsberger	1973–76	220	Bill Morrill	1957–59	174
Jeff Cook	1979–82	219	Bobby Benson	2000–03	167
Shack Stanwick	2015–18	209	Steven Boyle	2007–10	164
Ryan Brown	2013–16	209	Conor Ford	2001–04	160
Wells Stanwick	2012–15	208	Kyle Marr	2016–2019	158
Richie Hirsch	1974–77	204	Cole Williams	2017–21	157
Dan Denihan	1996-00	203	Matt Panetta	1988–91	157
Jacob Angelus	2020–24	201	Peter Scott	1981–84	157
Joe Cowan	1967–69	197	Joey Epstein	2019–22	156
Dave Marr	1993–96	193			

=== Four time All Americans ===
Name	Years	Position	Name	Years	Position
Dave Black	1979–82	Defense	Michael O'Neill	1975–78	Attack
Lloyd Bunting	1947–50	Defense	Brian Piccola	1991–95	Attack
John DeTomasso	1983–86	Defense	Paul Rabil	2005–08	Midfield
Delverne Dressel ^{[b]}	1983–86	Midfield	Terry Riordan	1992–95	Attack
Mark Greenberg	1977–80	Defense	Fred Smith	1947–50	Midfield
Richie Hirsch	1974–77	Attack	John Tolson	1938–41	Defense
Donaldson Kelly	1931–34	Attack	Doug Turnbull ^{[b]}	1922–25	Attack
Quint Kessenich	1987–90	Goaltender	Franz Wittelsberger	1973–76	Attack
Millard Lang	1931–34	Midfield	Brian Wood	1984–87	Attack
Milford Marchant	1993–96	Midfield			

^{[b]} Dressel and Turnbull were four-time first-team All American, two of only six in college lacrosse history

== Season results ==
The following is a list of Johns Hopkins's results by season as an NCAA Division I program:

Season	Coach	Overall	Conference	Standing	Postseason
Bob Scott (Independent) (1955–1974)
1971	Bob Scott	3–7			
1972	Bob Scott	11–2			NCAA Division I Runner–Up
1973	Bob Scott	11–2			NCAA Division I Runner–Up
1974	Bob Scott	12–2			NCAA Division I Champion
Bob Scott:		158–55–1 (.741)			
Henry Ciccarone (Independent) (1975–1983)
1975	Henry Ciccarone	9–2			NCAA Division I Quarterfinals
1976	Henry Ciccarone	9–4			NCAA Division I Final Four
1977	Henry Ciccarone	11–2			NCAA Division I Runner–Up
1978	Henry Ciccarone	13–1			NCAA Division I Champion
1979	Henry Ciccarone	13–0			NCAA Division I Champion
1980	Henry Ciccarone	14–1			NCAA Division I Champion
1981	Henry Ciccarone	13–1			NCAA Division I Runner–Up
1982	Henry Ciccarone	11–3			NCAA Division I Runner–Up
1983	Henry Ciccarone	12–2			NCAA Division I Runner–Up
Henry Ciccarone:		105–16 (.868)			
Don Zimmerman (Independent) (1984–1990)
1984	Don Zimmerman	14–0			NCAA Division I Champion
1985	Don Zimmerman	13–1			NCAA Division I Champion
1986	Don Zimmerman	10–2			NCAA Division I Final Four
1987	Don Zimmerman	10–3			NCAA Division I Champion
1988	Don Zimmerman	9–2			NCAA Division I Quarterfinals
1989	Don Zimmerman	11–2			NCAA Division I Runner–Up
1990	Don Zimmerman	6–5			NCAA Division I First Round
Don Zimmerman:		73–15 (.830)			
Tony Seaman (Independent) (1991–1998)
1991	Tony Seaman	8–4			NCAA Division I Quarterfinals
1992	Tony Seaman	8–5			NCAA Division I Final Four
1993	Tony Seaman	11–4			NCAA Division I Final Four
1994	Tony Seaman	9–5			NCAA Division I Quarterfinals
1995	Tony Seaman	13–1			NCAA Division I Final Four
1996	Tony Seaman	8–6			NCAA Division I Final Four
1997	Tony Seaman	10–4			NCAA Division I Quarterfinals
1998	Tony Seaman	10–4			NCAA Division I Quarterfinals
Tony Seaman:		77–33 (.700)			
John Haus (Independent) (1999–2000)
1999	John Haus	11–3			NCAA Division I Final Four
2000	John Haus	9–4			NCAA Division I Final Four
John Haus:		20–7 (.741)			
David Pietramala (Independent) (2001–2015)
2001	David Pietramala	8–4			NCAA Division I Quarterfinals
2002	David Pietramala	12–2			NCAA Division I Final Four
2003	David Pietramala	14–2			NCAA Division I Runner–Up
2004	David Pietramala	13–2			NCAA Division I Final Four
2005	David Pietramala	16–0			NCAA Division I Champion
2006	David Pietramala	9–5			NCAA Division I Quarterfinals
2007	David Pietramala	13–4			NCAA Division I Champion
2008	David Pietramala	11–6			NCAA Division I Runner–Up
2009	David Pietramala	10–5			NCAA Division I Quarterfinals
2010	David Pietramala	7–8			NCAA Division I First Round
2011	David Pietramala	13–3			NCAA Division I Quarterfinals
2012	David Pietramala	12–4			NCAA Division I Quarterfinals
2013	David Pietramala	9–5			
2014	David Pietramala	11–5			NCAA Division I Quarterfinals
David Pietramala (Big Ten Conference) (2015–2020)
2015	David Pietramala	11–7	4–1	T–1st	NCAA Division I Final Four
2016	David Pietramala	8–7	3–2	T–2nd	NCAA Division I First Round
2017	David Pietramala	8–7	3–2	T–2nd	NCAA Division I First Round
2018	David Pietramala	12–5	3–2	T–2nd	NCAA Division I Quarterfinals
2019	David Pietramala	8–8	3–2	T–2nd	NCAA Division I First Round
2020	David Pietramala	2–4	0–0	†	†
David Pietramala:		207–93 (.690)	16–9 (.640)		
Peter Milliman (Big Ten Conference) (2021–Present)
2021	Peter Milliman	4–9	2–8	T–5th	
2022	Peter Milliman	7–9	2–3	4th	
2023	Peter Milliman	12–6	4–1	T–1st	NCAA Division I Quarterfinals
2024	Peter Milliman	11–5	5–0	1st	NCAA Division I Quarterfinals
2025	Peter Milliman	6–8	0–5	6th	
2026	Peter Milliman	10–6	3–2	T–1st	NCAA Division I Quarterfinals
Peter Milliman:		50–43 (.538)	16–19 (.457)		
Total:		1,062–400–15 (.724)			
National champion Postseason invitational champion Conference regular season champion Conference regular season and conference tournament champion Division regular season champion Division regular season and conference tournament champion Conference tournament champion

†NCAA canceled 2020 collegiate activities due to the COVID-19 virus. Overall total includes pre-NCAA era records.

== Alumni in the Premier Lacrosse League (6) ==
Year Drafted	Name	Position	Height	Weight	Drafted By	Draft Pick	Current Team	All Star	Accolades
2021	Cole Williams	Midfield	6'5	215	Undrafted	Undrafted	Utah Archers	None	Champion ('24)
2022	Connor DeSimmone	Midfield	5'11	195	Undrafted	Undrafted	Utah Archers	None	Champion ('23)
2023	Alex Mazzone	Defense	6'2	195	Waterdogs	2nd round (16th overall)	Maryland Whipsnakes	None	None
2024	Garrett Degnon	Attack	6'4	215	California Redwoods	3rd round (18th overall)	Carolina Chaos	None	None
2024	Chayse Ierlan	Goalie	6'1	200	California Redwoods	4th round (29th overall)	California Redwoods	None	None
2024	Scott Smith	Defense	6'1	210	Boston Cannons	4th round (30th overall)	Carolina Chaos	None	None

== Alumni in the National Lacrosse League ==
Alumni Drafted or Active in the National Lacrosse League (NLL) - 2018 to Present
Year Drafted	Name	Position	Height	Weight	Drafted By	Draft Pick	Current team
2025	Stuart Phillips	Forward	5'11	185	Colorado	2nd Round (28th overall)	
2025	Jack Charboneau	Forward	6'2	190	Halifax	6th Round (87th overall)	
2024	Johnathan Peshko	Forward	6'4	200	Vancouver	1st Round (4th overall)	Oshawa
2024	Jakson Raposo	Transition	5'10	175	Albany	3rd Round (31st overall)	
2023	Brett Handsor	Defense	5'10	195	Toronto	5th Round (79th overall)	
2023	Hayden Fox	Defense	6'5	190	Philadelphia	6th Round (91st overall)	
2021	Taite Cattoni	Forward	5'9	180	Fort Worth	3rd Round (33rd overall)	
2020	Patrick Foley	Defense	6'1	1865	Undrafted	Undrafted	Philadelphia
2020	Marc Pion	Defense	6'0	195	Philadelphia	4th Round (59th overall)	Retired
2020	Jack Rapine	Defense	6'1	205	Philadelphia	4th Round (61st overall)	Retired
2020	Cole Williams	Forward	6'5	215	Philadelphia	6th Round (85th overall)	Retired
2019	Jake Fox	Forward	6'3	220	Long Island	2nd Round (19th overall)	
2019	Kyle Marr	Forward	5'11	185	Philadelphia	4th Round (51st overall)	Retired
2018	Joel Tinney	Transition	5'9	165	Georgia	2nd Round (18th overall)	Retired
2018	Tal Bruno	Defense	6'1	195	New England	3rd Round (34th overall)	Retired

== William C. Schmeisser Award ==
The William C. Schmeisser Award is an award given annually to the NCAA's most outstanding defenseman in men's college lacrosse. The award is presented by the USILA and is named after William C. "Father Bill" Schmeisser, a player and coach for Johns Hopkins University in the early 1900s.

== Jack Turnbull Award ==
The Lt. Col. J. I. Turnbull Award is named for Lt. Col. Jack Turnbull, a Blue Jays star, who died in World War II after his B-24 crashed while returning from a bombing run over Germany.

== See also ==
- Johns Hopkins – Maryland rivalry
- Johns Hopkins – Loyola rivalry
- Johns Hopkins–Princeton lacrosse rivalry
- Johns Hopkins–Syracuse lacrosse rivalry
- Johns Hopkins–Virginia lacrosse rivalry
- Johns Hopkins Blue Jays women's lacrosse
- NCAA Men's Lacrosse Championship
- USILA
