= Joel Tinney =

Canadian Lacrosse Player

Personal information
- Nationality: Canadian
- Born: June 12, 1995 (age 31) Cambridge, Ontario
- Height: 5 ft 10 in (178 cm)
- Weight: 175 lb (79 kg; 12 st 7 lb)

Sport
- Position: Midfield
- Shoots: Left
- Coached by: Drexel University
- NCAA team: Johns Hopkins University
- NLL draft: 18th overall, 2018; Georgia Swarm

Career highlights
- 2014 Big Ten Freshman of the Year; Two-time All-Big Ten; Big Ten Champion (2015, 2018)

Joel Tinney (born June 12, 1995) is a University of Michigan lacrosse assistant coach and former Canadian professional lacrosse player who has played for various teams in the National Lacrosse League (NLL), Major League Lacrosse (MLL), and the Premier Lacrosse League (PLL). He played collegiate lacrosse at Johns Hopkins University. He was drafted 18th overall of the 2018 NLL Entry Draft by the Georgia Swarm.

== Early Career and Education ==
Born in Cambridge, Ontario, Joel Tinney was recognized early in his career. He played for team Canada Under-19 during the 2012 U19 World Championship in Turku, Finland, winning the silver medal.

He attended Culver Academy in Indiana for high school, where he was ranked as the #2 freshman nationwide by Inside Lacrosse in 2014. He was named an Under-Armour All-American in 2014 before joining the Blue Jays.

== Collegiate career ==
Tinney played midfield for the Johns Hopkins Blue Jays, where he was a two-time first team All-American, Big Ten Freshman of the Year in 2014, two-time All-Big Ten honoree, Big Ten team champion in 2015 and 2018, and team captain. He missed the 2016 season due to an undisclosed NCAA violation. Tinney graduated from Johns Hopkins in 2018 with a political science and government degree.

Tinney became known for his hidden ball trick play against Navy, which went viral and was featured on ESPN's SportsCenter Top-10.

== Professional career ==
Tinney's professional career began in 2018. In 2019, Tinney was traded from the Georgia Swarm to the New England Black Wolves.

Throughout his career, he played for the New York Lizards, Atlas LC, Georgia Swarm, and the New England Black Wolves across the NLL, PLL, and MLL.

== Recent Activities and Coaching ==
In 2023, Tinney took up a role as an assistant coach at the University of Michigan.
