= Jeff Cook (lacrosse) =

American lacrosse player

Personal information
- Born: April 28, 1960 Baltimore, Maryland, U.S.
- Died: April 12, 2011 (aged 50) Ruxton-Riderwood, Maryland
- Height: 5 ft 11 in (180 cm)

Sport
- Position: Attack
- NCAA team: Johns Hopkins Blue Jays

Career highlights
- 1979 NCAA Division I Men's Lacrosse Championship; 1980 NCAA Division I Men's Lacrosse Championship; Jack Turnbull Award, Attackman of the Year, 1981; 1982 World Lacrosse Championship

Jeffrey "Jeff" Cook was an All-American lacrosse player at Johns Hopkins University from 1979 to 1982.

== Lacrosse career ==
Cook who prepped at St. Paul's School (Brooklandville, Maryland) and McDonogh School, led Johns Hopkins to a 51 and 5 record during his time there. With the Blue Jays, Cook won national titles in 1979 and 1980. He is ranked sixth all-time in Hopkin's career scoring with 219 points. Cook earned first-team All America honors two years and second-team honors while in college, as well as being named the National Collegiate Player of the Year and the National Collegiate Attackman of the Year winner in 1981.

Cook also led Hopkins to championship finals in 1981 and 1982, getting upset by UNC 14–13, Hopkins' first title game loss in the preceding four years, and losing also to North Carolina 7–5 in 1982.

Cook had a six-goal performance in the 14-13 finals loss to North Carolina in 1981. In that game he had a seventh goal disallowed because the referees did not see that Cook's shot had gone into the goal and out the other side, through the net.

Cook played for USA in the 1982 Lacrosse World Championships hosted in Baltimore, Maryland.

== Post-lacrosse ==
Cook was elected to the National Lacrosse Hall of Fame in 2006.

Cook, the three-time All-American, died April 12, 2011.

== Statistics ==
=== Johns Hopkins University ===
Season	GP	G	A	Pts	PPG
1979	13	13	7	20	--
1980	15	32	27	59	3.93
1981	14	52	28	80	5.71
1982	14	31	29	60	4.29
Totals	56	128	91	219	3.91

== Accomplishments ==
- 1979 Division I National Title
- 1980 Division I National Title
- 1981 National Collegiate Player of the Year
- 1981 National Collegiate Attackman of the Year
- 1982 National Collegiate Attackman of the Year
- 1982 World Lacrosse Championship Title (United States)

== See also ==
- 1979 NCAA Division I Men's Lacrosse Championship
- 1980 NCAA Division I Men's Lacrosse Championship
- Johns Hopkins Blue Jays lacrosse
- National Lacrosse Hall of Fame
- World Lacrosse Championship

== Awards ==
Preceded by Brendan Schneck	Lt. Raymond Enners Award; 1981	Succeeded by Tom Sears

Preceded by Mike Buzzell	Jack Turnbull Award; 1981, 1982	Succeeded by Tim Nelson
