= Johns Hopkins–Navy football rivalry =

Intercollegiate sports rivalry

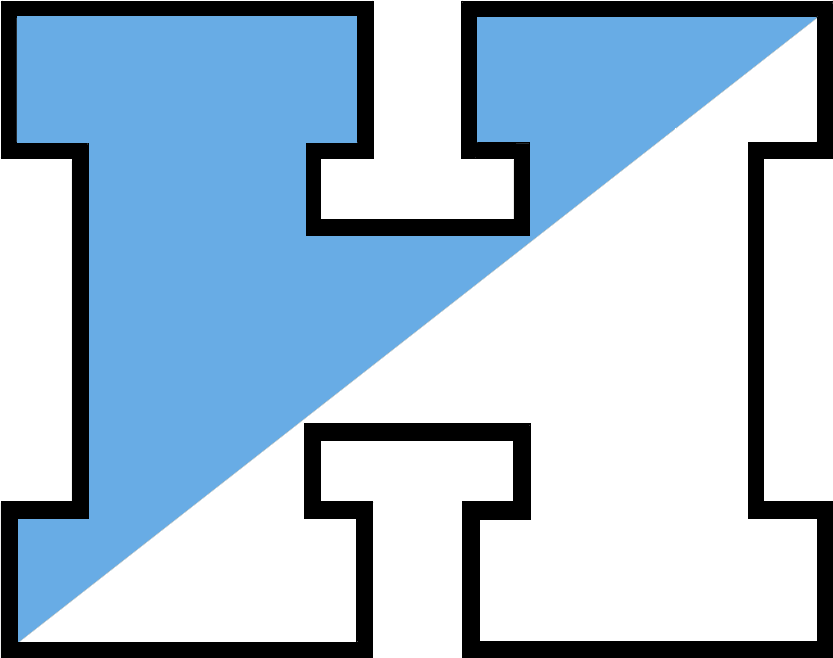
- Johns Hopkins Blue Jays Navy Midshipmen
- Sport: Football
- First meeting: November 30, 1882; Navy 8, Johns Hopkins 0
- Latest meeting: October 11, 1919; Navy 66, Johns Hopkins 0
- Next meeting: Defunct

Statistics
- Total meetings: 12
- All-time series: Navy leads, 9–3–0
- Largest victory: Navy, 66–0 (1919)
- Longest win streak: Navy, 4 (1889–1919)

Locations of Johns Hopkins and Navy

The Johns Hopkins–Navy football rivalry was an American intercollegiate football rivalry between the Johns Hopkins Blue Jays football team of Johns Hopkins University and the Navy Midshipmen football team of the United States Naval Academy. The two institutions, located within the span of a few miles in the state of Maryland, first met for a football game in 1882. Following the initial contest, both teams played each other annually for eight years, before it was called off for unknown reasons. The teams competed again in 1911 and 1912, again disbanding the contest until a final match took place in 1919.

The rivalry was controlled by Navy for its entirety, with the Midshipmen winning nine out of twelve contests played. While Johns Hopkins' largest win was a 25–12 defeat of the Naval Academy in 1888, Navy shutout Hopkins five times, including a 66–0 blowout in the 1919 contest. The rivalry was an essential contest for the beginning of both schools' football programs. Prior to the first game, Navy had competed in only a single contest. Johns Hopkins began their football program with the rivalry, originally having to play under a fake title in order to compete. The teams also have a historic rivalry in college lacrosse (see Johns Hopkins–Navy lacrosse rivalry).

== Background ==
It is widely believed by football researchers that the playing of intercollegiate football began in November 1869, when a player at Rutgers University challenged another player at the nearby College of New Jersey (now Princeton). The contest more closely resembled soccer, with teams scoring by kicking the ball into the opponent's net, and lacked a uniform rules structure. The game developed slowly; the first rules were drafted in October 1873, and only consisted of twelve guidelines. Even though the number of teams participating in the sport increased, the game was still effectively controlled by the College of New Jersey, who claimed eight national championships in ten years. Only Yale presented any form of challenge, claiming four national championships in the same time period.

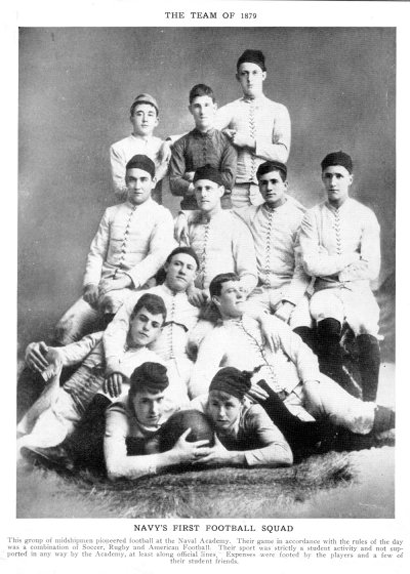
The official portrait of the 1879 Navy team

According to biographer C. Douglas Kroll, the first evidence of football at the United States Naval Academy came in 1857, but the school's cadets lost interest in the game shortly afterward. The first occurrence of serious interest in the sport came in 1879, when a squad of twelve cadets challenged men from the Baltimore Athletic Club to a contest. The team was captained by William John Maxwell, lacking "official" support from all academy supervisors. The team was student operated, and supported by the friends of the players. The 1879 game with Baltimore ended in a 0–0 tie, where the Naval Academy apparently never gained control of the ball. The team was credited with creating the first football uniform, worn during the game. Following the 1879 season, football at the Naval Academy went on a two-year hiatus, returning in 1882 under the leadership of Vaulx Carter.

Johns Hopkins University, located north of the Naval Academy, in Baltimore, started their football program a couple of years after Navy. Hopkins' first team was assembled in 1881, and spent an entire year training and learning a version of the game. Their sport, which was closer to rugby, was played in Druid Hill Park. After the training, the team planned a two-game 1882 season. The squad had to play the season under the title of the Clifton Athletic Club, due to the school's policy on the sport of football. The first was a practice game with the Baltimore Athletic Club, played on October 7. The Hopkins team lost the contest 4–0. The following game was their first true game, to be played against the Naval Academy.

== Series history ==
=== Beginnings, 1882–83 ===
The rivalry began in 1882, when cadet Vaulx Carter reintroduced football to the United States Naval Academy. Acting as both a player and a coach, Carter procured a single game for the academy to play. The team challenged the Baltimore-based Clifton Athletic Club to a game during the academy's Thanksgiving Day athletic carnival. The Clifton team was actually made up of players from Johns Hopkins, who were unable to play as their school due to the institution's harsh opinion on football.

It snowed heavily before the game, to the point where players for both teams had to clear layers of snow off of the field, making large piles of snow along the sides of the playing ground. The field was 110 yards by 53 yards, with goalposts 25 feet (7.6 m) apart and 20 feet (6.1 m) high. The first half of the game went scoreless; the Baltimore American reported that "the visitors pushed Navy every place but over the goal line in the first half". During play, the ball was kicked over the seawall a number of times, once going so far out it had to be retrieved by boat before play could continue. The American described the second half in detail:

After ten minutes interval the ball was again put in play, this time being kicked off by the Cliftons. The rest period had apparently stiffened the Cliftons, for the Academy making a vigorous spurt got the ball thru them, and Street, following it up well, scored a touchdown for the Academy.

The try at goal failed, but the ball, instead of going to the Cliftons behind the line, fell into the field and into the hands of one of the Academy team. By a quick decisive run, he again got the ball over the Cliftons goal line and scored a touchdown.

Cadet George Washington Street was identified as the first person to score a touchdown for the Naval Academy. The Baltimore Sun stated that William Abrose O'Malley was the cadet who caught Street's blocked kick and scored the second touchdown. The Sun also covered, in detail, the uniforms the squads wore; Johns Hopkins sported black and light blue striped jerseys and caps, with white pants and blue socks. The Naval Academy wore maroon socks, caps, and belts, with white pants and jerseys. Both teams also nailed strips of leather to the bottom of their shoes to help deal with slipping.

The game began in heat and discussion and ended in quarrel and wrangle. At one point matters grew so hot that the Hopkins team was about to stop playing. The Hopkins team had the skill and light weight; the Academy team the endurance and muscle. Paul Dashiell (of Hopkins) kept up his reputation as a fine player, one of his feats being a standing leap over the heads of the Cadet rush line.

— The Baltimore American, describing the 1883 contest in a short article.

The Naval Academy challenged Johns Hopkins again the next year. By this time the Hopkins team had procured the approval of their school officials to participate in football and were playing under the name Johns Hopkins for the first time. The 1883 game, again played during the academy's Thanksgiving Day athletic carnival, was a 2–0 victory for Johns Hopkins. Hopkins won the game on two single-point safeties, both of which were intentionally made by Navy to prevent Johns Hopkins from gaining possession on the edge of the endzone. Writer Morris Allison Bealle summed up the game as a "backed up" victory for Hopkins, due to its manner of scoring.

=== Annual competition, 1884–89 ===
Starting in 1884, the rivalry was played annually or bi-annually until 1889. All of the games were hosted at the Naval Academy. According to writers Taylor Baldwin Kiland and Jamie Howren, all games played during that time were hosted on whatever parade or drill field was unused at the time at the academy, instead of Navy having a specific football-dedicated area. The 1884 game, which was played entirely under the rules of rugby, was a rematch with Johns Hopkins. In the first half, Hopkins scored twice, on a touchdown from a Mr. Bonsall and on a two-point safety. Navy returned the favor in the second half of the game when halfback Julius Dashiell, brother of Hopkins' Paul Dashiell, kicked a five-point goal and rusher David W. Taylor scored a touchdown to secure a victory.

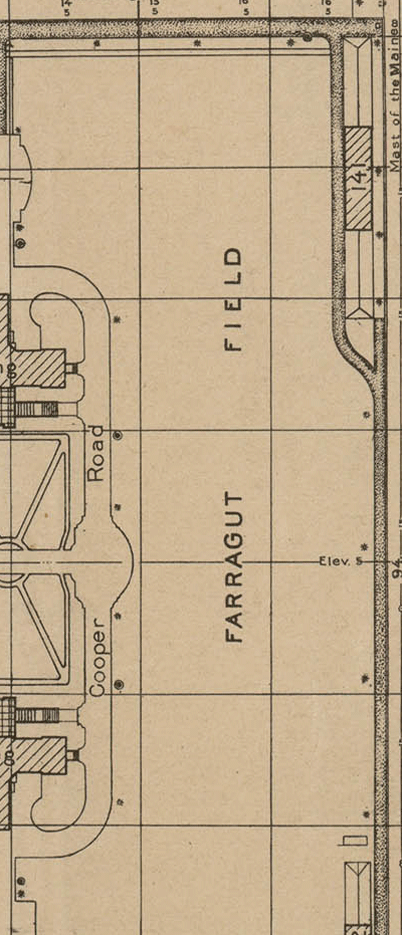
Between 1884 and 1889, all games played at the academy were likely hosted on an unused drill field (Farragut Field pictured)

The next year, in 1885, Naval Academy officials finally approved of the playing of football. According to Morris Allison Bealle, "Football at Annapolis had shed its swaddling clothes when the autumn of 1885 rolled around. Some of the faculty actually gave in and admitted that football might, at that, be or become an interesting diversion". After Navy won their opener and Hopkins split their record at 1–1, the two teams met again at the Naval Academy Thanksgiving Day athletic carnival. Johns Hopkins managed a 12–8 victory over the academy, tying the series at two wins apiece.

In 1886, the Thanksgiving Day tradition was changed slightly. On November 13, Johns Hopkins traveled to Annapolis and lost to Navy 6–0. After the Naval Academy defeated St. John's College again and Hopkins won back-to-back contests with Gallaudet, the two teams played for a second time that season, again in Annapolis. The game, which was the traditional Thanksgiving Day competition, was a 15–14 victory for the Naval Academy. Johns Hopkins led for the majority of the game, with Navy only gaining the lead at the very end of the match. The Baltimore American covered the game in detail:

"Early in the first half, by much rushing, forcing, snapbacks and vigorous bullyragging Riggs, the huge Hopkins quarterback, crashed over the goal line for 4 points. Paul Dashiell converted. Riggs repeated his performance but Dashiell missed conversion. Navy then adopted the Hopkins rushing tactics and Stone went over for the first score".

"With Hopkins backed up against her own goal line, Dashiell broke through the entire Navy team for a touchdown. Goal was missed and the score was 14 to 6 against Navy. With the game fast coming to a close The Tars formed a closely knit ball with the halfback in center".

"Navy hit paydirt but the referee found something illegal and called the ball back, much to the consternation of the Cadet rooters. But on the next play George Hayward kicked a field goal, making the score 14 to 11. Just before the game ended a double pass, Bill Cloke to captain Clarence Stone, carried to ball over the Hopkins goal for the 4 points that won the game".

The Cadet and Hopkins spectators were making things lively by their advice to the players and umpires alternately, dissenting from decisions and testifying their dissatisfaction generally at everything which displeased them.

— The fans at the 1887 game, as described by the Baltimore Sun

The following year, the contest was again played as a part of the academy's athletic carnival. As an experiment, the academy hosted a double-header that day; the official Navy team challenged their "by-this-time ancient rivals from Johns Hopkins" while their junior team would play against the Dupont Athletic Club immediately afterwards. The Naval Academy defeated Hopkins 8–0 and their junior team won 14–0. Navy's first score on Hopkins was when a cadet recovered a missed field goal and returned it for a touchdown. The score which secured the game for Navy was a safety, awarded after a Hopkins player accidentally stepped out of the back of the endzone. The Baltimore Sun noted how fans for both teams in the 1887 contest "did everything but get into the game themselves".

The decline of the series began following the 1887 match. Bitter feelings were evident at Johns Hopkins, which put strained feelings on the schools' competition. In Navy's following game, against the Princeton Reserves team, Hopkins students traveled to the academy to support the Princeton squad. The following year, Hopkins returned to the Naval Academy, where they managed their largest ever defeat of Navy, 25–12. During the contest, Hopkins supporters "discovered" the using of a cheering section. Morris Allison Bealle wrote that "the 'Hoppies' uncovered something new in sports—a cheering section which gave the team yell in unison".

Despite the strong win, bitter feelings at Johns Hopkins continued to grow into the next season. The school's attitude towards the series worsened to the point where the 1889 game was rescheduled away from the traditional Thanksgiving Day playing and was moved to a week earlier. That year's game ended in a 36–0 shutout victory for the Naval Academy, and wound up being the breaking point for Johns Hopkins. Hopkins decided to terminate the series following that game. However, Hopkins' students returned to the Naval Academy the following year, yet again to root against Navy, this time supporting Lehigh.

=== Brief renewal, 1911–12 and 1919 ===
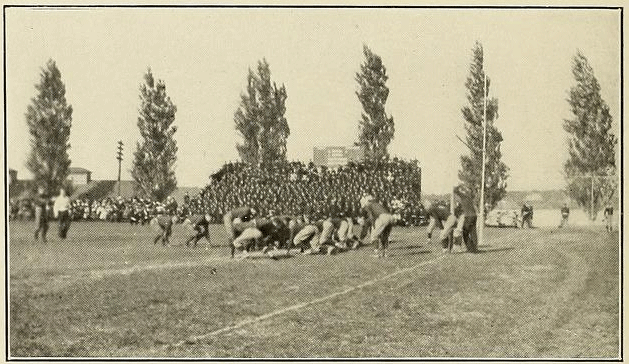
A photo of gameplay from the 1911 contest

It took 22 years for an attempt to revive the rivalry. In 1911, both schools agreed to open their seasons with an effort to bring back the competition. The game, played on October 7, began "[as] somewhat of a disappointment" for the Naval Academy, when Johns Hopkins scored early in the contest. Navy managed an 8–0–1 record the previous season, and went unscored upon. However, the academy recovered and put up twenty-seven unanswered points to win 27–5. Only one other team, North Carolina A&M, managed to score on the Naval Academy that season, putting up just six points. The teams agreed to start their following season with another playing of the rivalry. Navy considered Hopkins to be "a small eastern college to practice upon", instead of a serious opponent. The academy's team entered the game expecting an easy win, but were surprised by Johns Hopkins and barely managed a 7–3 victory. The rivalry was yet again ended after that game, but returned for one final playing in 1919. The 1921 Naval Academy yearbook wrote that Johns Hopkins was "outweighed, outgeneraled, and outclassed in every department of the game, they were shoved back over their goal line ten times". The game was the most lopsided in the rivalry's history, Navy winning 66–0.

== Statistics ==
Criteria	Johns Hopkins	Navy
Wins	3	9
Home wins	1	9
Road wins	2	0
Consecutive wins	1	4
Most total points in a game	66	66
Most points in a win	25	66
Most points in a loss	14	12
Fewest total points in a game	2	2
Largest margin of victory	13	66
Smallest margin of victory	2	1
Total points scored in series	67	206
Shut-outs of opposing team	1	5
Total of Games played	12	

== Game results ==
Johns Hopkins victories	Navy victories

No.	Date	Location	Winner	Score
1	November 30, 1882	Annapolis, MD	Navy	8–0
2	November 29, 1883	Baltimore, MD	Johns Hopkins	2–0
3	November 27, 1884	Annapolis, MD	Navy	9–6
4	November 26, 1885	Annapolis, MD	Johns Hopkins	12–8
5	November 13, 1886	Annapolis, MD	Navy	6–0
6	November 25, 1886	Annapolis, MD	Navy	15–14
7	November 24, 1887	Annapolis, MD	Navy	8–0
8	November 29, 1888	Annapolis, MD	Johns Hopkins	25–12
9	November 2, 1889	Annapolis, MD	Navy	36–0
10	October 7, 1911	Annapolis, MD	Navy	27–5
11	October 5, 1912	Annapolis, MD	Navy	7–3
12	October 11, 1919	Annapolis, MD	Navy	66–0
Series: Navy leads 9–3

== See also ==
- List of NCAA college football rivalry games
- Johns Hopkins–Navy lacrosse rivalry
