= 1979 NCAA Division I lacrosse tournament =

1979 NCAA Division I men's lacrosse tournament
- Dates: May 16–26, 1979
- Teams: 8
- Finals site: Byrd Stadium, College Park, Maryland
- Champions: Johns Hopkins (3rd title)
- Runner-up: Maryland (6th title game)
- Semifinalists: Navy (6th Final Four); Virginia (3rd Final Four)
- Winning coach: Henry Ciccarone (2nd title)
- MOP: Mike Federico, Goalie, Johns Hopkins
- Attendance: 16,166 finals 25,241 total
- Top scorers: Bob Boneillo, Maryland; Barry Mitchell, Maryland (14 goals)

The 1979 NCAA Division I lacrosse tournament was the ninth annual tournament hosted by the National Collegiate Athletic Association to determine the team champion of men's college lacrosse among its Division I programs at the end of the 1979 NCAA Division I lacrosse season.

Defending champions Johns Hopkins defeated Maryland in the championship game, 15–9.

The championship game was played at Byrd Stadium at the University of Maryland in College Park, Maryland, where 16,166 fans were in attendance.

== Overview ==
Twelve NCAA Division I college men's lacrosse teams met after having played their way through a regular season, and for some, a conference tournament.

This tournament was notable as the only entry for NC State, led by Stan Cockerton, into the NCAA tournament. The lacrosse program at North Carolina State was discontinued shortly afterwards.

This was one of the great seasons in Hopkins' history, with highlights of the 13–0 season including wins over #2 Maryland and #5 Virginia (twice each) as well as wins over #3 Navy, #4 Cornell, North Carolina State, and #6 Army. Hopkins was ranked first in the nation for 11 straight weeks. The team averaged over 15 goals a game and gave up under 7 goals a game, with only two teams able to score double digits in goals against Hopkins.

In the finals, Johns Hopkins used one of the all-time best defenses led by Hall of Fame goalie Mike Federico and defenseman Mark Greenberg, as well as a strong offense led by Dave Huntley and Jeff Cook, to defeat the Terrapins for the second time that season. Johns Hopkins took control with five unanswered goals in the second period of the title game. Also, in the second quarter, Hopkins' defense held Maryland in check where the Terps did not get a shot on goal off for over 11 minutes. Hopkins had handed the Terrapins five of their losses over the prior three seasons, including consecutive defeats in the semifinals of the Division I tournaments in 1977 and 1978.

The top seed in the tournament went to the Blue Jays after a 10–0 regular season record. Johns Hopkins were winners of 17 in a row since a mid-season defeat in 1978 by Cornell. Hopkins went on to win 25 straight games through the 1980 season.

Syracuse appeared for the first time in an NCAA tournament while Maryland made its ninth straight tournament appearance. Following this title game, Hopkins had won or tied for 34 national championships, more than twice as many as any other school.

This was a great stretch of tournament play for the Terrapins as during the 1970s, Maryland participated in six NCAA title games, including four in a row from 1973 to 1976. During that span, the Terps won two national titles and lost four.

== Bracket ==
Quarterfinals; May 16
1	Johns Hopkins	20
8	NC State	6
4	Virginia	15
5	Cornell	8
3	Navy	16
6	Massachusetts	14
2	Maryland	16
7	Syracuse	13

Semifinals; May 19
1	Johns Hopkins	16
4	Virginia	7
3	Navy	10
2	Maryland	15

Championship; May 26
1	Johns Hopkins (13–0)	15
2	Maryland (9–2)	9

== Box scores ==
=== Finals ===
Team	1	2	3	4	Total
Johns Hopkins (13–0)	3	5	4	3	15
Maryland (9–2)	4	0	3	2	9
Johns Hopkins scoring – Jeff Cook 3, Dave Huntley 3, Ned Radebaugh 2, Wayne Davis 2, Scott Baugher 2, Steve Wey, Jim Bidne, Joe Garavante; Maryland scoring – Bob Boneillo 3, Terry Kimball 2, Barry Mitchell 2, Ron Martinello, John Lamon; Shots: Johns Hopkins 46, Maryland 33; Saves: Johns Hopkins Mike Federico 12, Maryland Bryant Waters 10 - Shassian 2; Location: College Park, Maryland (Byrd Stadium) – 5/26/1979; Attendance: 17,228

=== Semifinals ===
Team	1	2	3	4	Total
Johns Hopkins	3	2	7	4	16
Virginia	2	1	1	3	7
Johns Hopkins scoring – Scott Baugher 4, Wayne Davis 3, Jeff Harris 2, Mike Donnelly 2, Dave Huntley, Bob Teasdall, Ned Radebaugh, Jim Bidne; Virginia scoring – Ray Giusto 2, Sonny Esposito, Paul O’Brien, John Driscoll, Bill Seery, Randy Natoli; Shots: Johns Hopkins 44, Virginia 34; Saves: Johns Hopkins Mike Federico 10 - Wally Kidd 3, Virginia Joe Bottner 11 - Brian Gregory 3; Location: Baltimore, Maryland (Homewood Field) – 5/19/1979; Attendance: 5,000

Team	1	2	3	4	Total
Maryland	5	2	5	3	15
Navy	2	2	4	2	10
Maryland scoring – Barry Mitchell 3, Terry Kimball 3, Bob Boneillo 2, Ron Martinello 2, Mike Farrell 2, Klay Johnson 2, John Lamon; Navy scoring – Mike Hannan 3, Mike Buzzell 2, David Guill 2, Roger Sexauer 2, Mike Chanenchuk; Shots: Maryland 58, Navy 52; Saves: Maryland Bryant Waters 20, Navy Johnson 21; Location: College Park, Maryland (Byrd Stadium) – 5/19/1979; Attendance: 5,000

=== Quarterfinals ===
Team	1	2	3	4	Total
Johns Hopkins	5	8	2	5	20
North Carolina State	2	2	2	0	6
Johns Hopkins scoring – Jim Bidne 4, Wayne Davis 4, Ned Radebaugh 2, Bob Teasdall 2, Joe Garavente, Dave Huntley, Kevin Kilner, Jeff Harris; North Carolina State scoring – Dan Wilson 3, Walter Hein 2, Ted Manos; Shots: Johns Hopkins 51, North Carolina St. 35; Saves: Johns Hopkins Mike Federico 15 - Wally Kidd 4, North Carolina St. Bob Flintoff 20 - Wagner 0; Location: Baltimore, Maryland (Homewood Field) – 5/16/1979; Attendance: 2,800

Team	1	2	3	4	Total
Virginia	5	8	2	5	15
Cornell	3	2	1	2	8
Virginia scoring – Bato Pellington 4, John Driscoll 2, Paul O’Brien 2, Bill Seery 2, Rick Giusto 2, Tom Holman, Matt Rainis, Sonny Esposito; Cornell scoring – John Mutch 2, Charlie Wood 2, Joe Szombathy, Jim DeNicola, Reiley McDonald, Wade Bollinger; Shots: Cornell 43, Virginia 31

Team	1	2	3	4	Total
Navy	2	7	4	3	16
Massachusetts	3	3	5	3	14
Navy scoring – Mike Hannan 5, Mike Buzzell 3, Mike Chanenchuk 2, Roger Sexauer 2, Sid Abernathy 2, Bill Anderson, Charlie Mark; Massachusetts scoring – Jim Weller 4, Ed Murray 2, Brooks Sweet 2, Lee Vosburgh 2, Peter Schmitz 2, Mike Lewis, Tom Walters; Shots: Navy 53, Massachusetts 52

Team	1	2	3	4	Total
Maryland	4	2	2	8	16
Syracuse	3	4	3	3	13
Maryland scoring – Barry Mitchell 4, Ron Martinello 4, John Lamon 2, Bob Boneillo 2, Bob Ott, Mike Duffy, Mike Farrell, Nick Manis; Syracuse scoring – Kevin Donahue 5, Ralph Spinola 2, Tim O’Hara 2, Greg Cunningham 2, Tom Donahue, Brad Short; Shots: Maryland 54, Syracuse 41

== Outstanding players ==
- Mike Federico, Goalie, Johns Hopkins, tournament Most Outstanding Player

=== Leading scorers ===
Name	GP	G	A	Pts
Barry Mitchell, Maryland	3	8	7	14
Bob Boneillo, Maryland	3	6	6	12
Wayne Davis, Johns Hopkins	3	9	2	11
Scott Baugher, Johns Hopkins	3	8	3	11
Mike Buzzell, Navy	2	6	4	10
Dave Huntley, Johns Hopkins	2	9	1	10
Ron Martinello, Maryland	3	8	2	10
John Lamon, Maryland	2	7	3	10
Ned Radebaugh, Johns Hopkins	3	5	4	9
Mike Chanenchuk, Navy	2	3	6	9

== See also ==
- Division I Undefeated National Champions
- 1979 NCAA Division II lacrosse tournament
