= Johns Hopkins–Navy lacrosse rivalry =

College sports rivalry

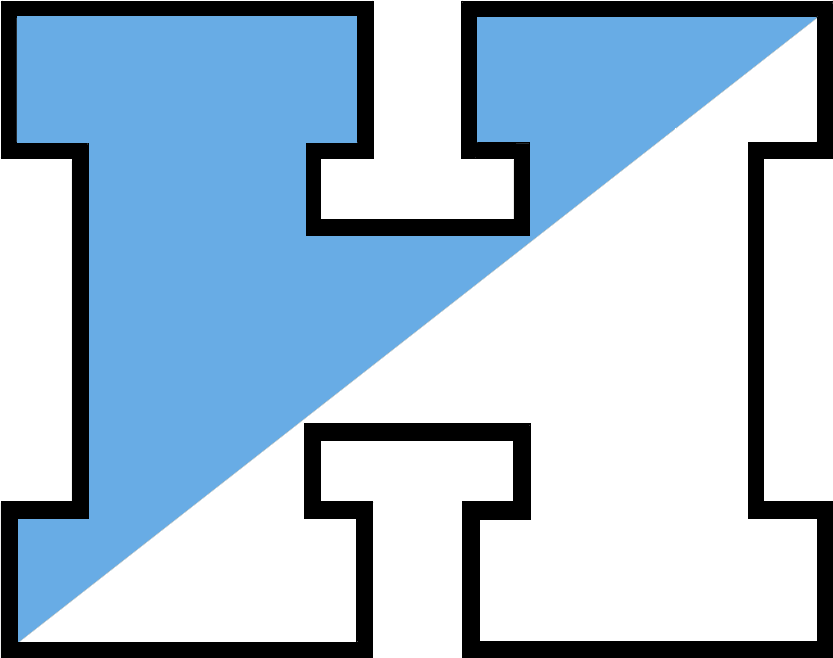
- Johns Hopkins Blue Jays Navy Midshipmen
- First meeting: 1908; Johns Hopkins 6, Navy 1
- Latest meeting: March 14, 2026; Johns Hopkins 14, Navy 10

Statistics
- Total meetings: 105
- All-time series: Johns Hopkins leads, 65–29–1
- Largest victory: Johns Hopkins, 24–5 (1997)
- Longest win streak: Johns Hopkins, 36 (1975–2009)
- Current win streak: Johns Hopkins, 2 (2025–present)

The Johns Hopkins–Navy lacrosse rivalry is an intercollegiate lacrosse rivalry between the Johns Hopkins Blue Jays and Navy Midshipmen. While historical rivals in football, the lacrosse series has been the headlining competition between the two universities. The Maryland programs were both national powers prior to NCAA sponsorship of the sport, with 35 national titles for the Blue Jays and 17 for the Midshipmen. They both continue to rank one-two in the most total national championships of any program in collegiate lacrosse. While both mainstays on the national stage in the modern era, Hopkins has dominated Navy head-to-head, winning 36 consecutive from 1975 to 2009. The series, annual since 1950 was halted in 2017 due to scheduling issues from conference realignment, as the longtime independents joined the Patriot League and Big Ten Conference respectively in the last decade. A 2020 renewal was cancelled due to the COVID-19 pandemic, and was instead renewed in 2022. As of 2024, Johns Hopkins leads the series 63–29–1.

== Series history ==
=== Early years (1900s to 1960s) ===
Johns Hopkins bested the Midshipmen in the inaugural meeting by a score of 6 to 1. Navy gained its first win in the series in 1910, as the game was played on a semi-annual basis through 1928. The Midshipmen defeated the Jays in 1928 and would share the USILA Gold Medal with Johns Hopkins, Maryland, and Rutgers. The hiatus began with a relatively even series; Navy led 9–7–1. The two would reconcile in 1943 in Annapolis, before resuming the series in 1946 and playing annually from 1949 to 2017.

Post-World War II resumption began with five consecutive Jays victories, their longest streak to that point. Notably, the state rivals did not meet during the 1949 campaign, as the Navy ended with an undefeated 11–0 record but had to settle for a split national championship with Hopkins. Navy would respond by reeling off four straight victories over Hopkins, but the Jays would counter by winning the next three. Up to this point, both teams were title contenders each season, with Hopkins winning five titles and Navy winning three since resumption. 1959 marked a crucial turning point. Johns Hopkins would claim the national title, but Navy downed the Jays 13–11 to deny them a perfect season. This was the first of eight consecutive Midshipmen victories under coach Willis Bilderback, their longest streak in the rivalry. The last seven of these coincided with Navy national titles and preeminence over the sport. In 1967, Johns Hopkins broke the streak with a 9–6 defeat of Navy, but the teams would ultimately share the USILA championship with Maryland. 1969 featured a three-goal victory for the Midshipmen in Baltimore, the most recent time that they have won the rivalry game on the road at Homewood Field. In 1970, Navy and the Jays would again share the title, this time with Virginia, as Hopkins handed Navy their only defeat on the season.

=== Hopkins dominance (1970s through 2000s) ===
1971 marked the first year in the NCAA Division I Men's Lacrosse Championship era. Though a Division III program in most sports, Hopkins was grandfathered into Division I for men's lacrosse, enabling the Navy rivalry to continue. That 1971 season the teams played a rare neutral matchup, held in Houston, the first college lacrosse game ever played in the state of Texas. Played in front of nearly 20,000 spectators at the Astrodome to set a single-game NCAA attendance record, the game has been credited for increasing Texan interest in the sport. Navy felled the Jays, as they finished with a rare losing season at 3–7 and missed the inaugural tournament. Hopkins would win its first NCAA title in 1974 but dropped its regular season matchup with Navy. The #6 Midshipmen upset the #2 Jays 13–12 in Annapolis. The next year would not be as successful against Hopkins for Navy, losing 16–11, but the Midshipmen would end the season as the national runner-up.

That matchup in 1974 would be the last for Navy against their in-state rivals for 36 years. The streak is further unprecedented by the fact that the Midshipmen were consistently good on the national stage. From the introduction of the USILA polls in 1973, all but one Hopkins–Navy meeting was between two Top 10 teams until the 1990 contest. All games were between ranked teams until 1996, when Navy entered unranked. The nature of the streak carries comparisons with Navy's college football rivalry with Notre Dame, in which the Fighting Irish defeated the Midshipmen for 43 consecutive years, the longest streak between Division I opponents in NCAA history. Navy ended that dubious distinction in 2007 with a 46–44 triple overtime victory and would finally end their losing steak against Hopkins several years later.

=== Recent years (2010–present) ===
2010 would mark the season that Navy finally got over the hump against their rivals. Prior to the game, longtime Midshipmen coach Richie Meade told his players "You’re Midshipmen at the Naval Academy, your future leaders and people’s lives are going to be in your hands. You understand the mission, you understand what you’re required to do, and now I want you to go out and get it done." Navy rallied from an early five goal deficit, scoring six in the second quarter to take a narrow lead into halftime. After a spirited second half, the game went to overtime tied at eight. Since 2000, three Blue Jays victories came in overtime and 2010 would go down the same route. However, this time Navy prevailed in the extra session to win 9–8.

Two seasons later, the Midshipmen put on a spectacular defensive display, holding Hopkins to just two goals in an 8–2 victory. The Jays would win the next five, including a double overtime victory in 2016. The 2017 contest was the first between Top 10 teams since 2008, as the Jays rolled to a comfortable seven goal victory. After that game, the series took a two-year hiatus due to scheduling concerns between the schools, in part due to their recent decisions to join conferences, giving up their historical independent status. A renewal was scheduled in 2020 but the game, along with the entire NCAA season, was cancelled due to concerns stemming from the COVID-19 pandemic.

== Rival accomplishments ==
The following summarizes the accomplishments of the two programs.

Team	Johns Hopkins Blue Jays	Navy Midshipmen
Pre-NCAA National Titles	35	17
NCAA National Titles	9	0
NCAA Final Four Appearances	29	8
NCAA Tournament Appearances	47	27
NCAA Tournament Record	71–38	17–27
Conference Tournament Titles	2	5
Conference Championships	2	8
Tewaarton Award Recipients	1	0
Lt. Raymond Enners Award Recipients	11	0
Consensus First Team All-Americans	184	105
All-time Program Record	993–356–15	807–366–14
All-time Winning Percentage	.739	.686

== Game results ==
Johns Hopkins victories	Navy victories	Tie games

No.	Date	Location	Winner	Score
1	1908	Baltimore, MD	Johns Hopkins	6–1
2	1909	Baltimore, MD	Johns Hopkins	7–2
3	1910	Baltimore, MD	Navy	7–6
4	1911	Baltimore, MD	Johns Hopkins	2–1
5	1913	Baltimore, MD	Tie	4–4
6	1914	Baltimore, MD	Navy	5–2
7	1915	Baltimore, MD	Johns Hopkins	4–2
8	1916	Baltimore, MD	Johns Hopkins	6–3
9	1918	Baltimore, MD	Navy	12–0
10	1919	Baltimore, MD	Navy	5–3
11	1921	Baltimore, MD	Navy	9–0
12	1922	Annapolis, MD	Navy	9–1
13	1923	Annapolis, MD	Navy	6–3
14	1924	Baltimore, MD	Johns Hopkins	5–4
15	1925	Annapolis, MD	Navy	8–1
16	1927	Baltimore, MD	Johns Hopkins	6–5
17	1928	Baltimore, MD	Navy	5–3
18	1943	Annapolis, MD	Navy	7–4
19	1946	Annapolis, MD	Johns Hopkins	12–9
20	1947	Baltimore, MD	Johns Hopkins	14–7
21	1948	Annapolis, MD	Johns Hopkins	9–8
22	1950	Annapolis, MD	Johns Hopkins	8–4
23	1951	Baltimore, MD	Johns Hopkins	13–10
24	1952	Annapolis, MD	Navy	10–9
25	1953	Baltimore, MD	Navy	7–4
26	1954	Annapolis, MD	Navy	12–3
27	1955	Baltimore, MD	Navy	13–3
28	1956	Annapolis, MD	Johns Hopkins	8–6
29	1957	Baltimore, MD	Johns Hopkins	15–6
30	1958	Annapolis, MD	Johns Hopkins	14–7
31	1959	Baltimore, MD	Navy	13–11
32	1960	Annapolis, MD	Navy	15–7
33	1961	Baltimore, MD	Navy	15–9

No.	Date	Location	Winner	Score
34	1962	Annapolis, MD	Navy	16–11
35	1963	Baltimore, MD	Navy	10–5
36	1964	Annapolis, MD	Navy	15–3
37	1965	Baltimore, MD	Navy	15–6
38	1966	Annapolis, MD	Navy	12–7
39	1967	Baltimore, MD	Johns Hopkins	9–6
40	1968	Annapolis, MD	Johns Hopkins	11–3
41	1969	Baltimore, MD	Navy	9–6
42	1970	Annapolis, MD	Johns Hopkins	9–7
43	1971	Houston, TX	Navy	9–6
44	1972	Annapolis, MD	Johns Hopkins	17–3
45	1973	Baltimore, MD	#1 Johns Hopkins	12–7
46	1974	Annapolis, MD	#6 Navy	13–12
47	1975	Baltimore, MD	#1 Johns Hopkins	16–11
48	1976	Annapolis, MD	#5 Johns Hopkins	18–10
49	1977	Baltimore, MD	#3 Johns Hopkins	17–11
50	1978	Annapolis, MD	#2 Johns Hopkins	22–11
51	1979	Baltimore, MD	#1 Johns Hopkins	17–10
52	1980	Annapolis, MD	#2 Johns Hopkins	13–8
53	1981	Baltimore, MD	#1 Johns Hopkins	9–6
54	1982	Annapolis, MD	#3 Johns Hopkins	12–7
55	1983	Baltimore, MD	#1 Johns Hopkins	13–8
56	1984	Annapolis, MD	#2 Johns Hopkins	9–6
57	1985	Baltimore, MD	#1 Johns Hopkins	24–10
58	1986	Annapolis, MD	#1 Johns Hopkins	14–11
59	1987	Baltimore, MD	#6 Johns Hopkins	10–9
60	1988	Annapolis, MD	#2 Johns Hopkins	10–7
61	1989	Baltimore, MD	#1 Johns Hopkins	7–5
62	1990	Annapolis, MD	#11 Johns Hopkins	6–4
63	1991	Baltimore, MD	#7 Johns Hopkins	15–11
64	1992	Annapolis, MD	#6 Johns Hopkins	22–12
65	1993	Baltimore, MD	#4 Johns Hopkins	11–8
66	1994	Annapolis, MD	#6 Johns Hopkins	12–11

No.	Date	Location	Winner	Score
67	1995	Baltimore, MD	#1 Johns Hopkins	16–8
68	1996	Annapolis, MD	#5 Johns Hopkins	18–11
69	1997	Baltimore, MD	#4 Johns Hopkins	24–5
70	1998	Annapolis, MD	#3 Johns Hopkins	15–14
71	1999	Baltimore, MD	#2 Johns Hopkins	11–1
72	2000	Annapolis, MD	#8 Johns Hopkins	7–6^{OT}
73	2001	Baltimore, MD	#6 Johns Hopkins	13–11
74	2002	Annapolis, MD	#2 Johns Hopkins	9–8
75	2003	Baltimore, MD	#1 Johns Hopkins	17–3
76	2004	Annapolis, MD	#1 Johns Hopkins	10–9^{OT}
77	2005	Baltimore, MD	#1 Johns Hopkins	9–8^{OT}
78	2006	Annapolis, MD	#12 Johns Hopkins	9–8
79	2007	Baltimore, MD	#7 Johns Hopkins	10–9
80	2008	Annapolis, MD	#7 Johns Hopkins	12–5
81	2008	Annapolis, MD	#4 Johns Hopkins	10–4
82	2009	Baltimore, MD	#9 Johns Hopkins	15–7
83	2010	Annapolis, MD	Navy	9–8^{OT}
84	2011	Baltimore, MD	#2 Johns Hopkins	14–5
85	2012	Annapolis, MD	Navy	8–2
86	2013	Baltimore, MD	#11 Johns Hopkins	15–4
87	2014	Annapolis, MD	#6 Johns Hopkins	6–5
88	2015	Baltimore, MD	#17 Johns Hopkins	13–8
89	2016	Annapolis, MD	#5 Johns Hopkins	12–11^{2OT}
90	2017	Baltimore, MD	#8 Johns Hopkins	15–8
91	2022	Baltimore, MD	Navy	11–10
92	2023	Annapolis, MD	Johns Hopkins	12–9
93	2024	Baltimore, MD	Navy	10–9^{OT}
94	2025	Annapolis, MD	#11 Johns Hopkins	12–9
95	2026	Baltimore, MD	#14 Johns Hopkins	14–10
Series: Johns Hopkins leads 65–29–1
