= Dave Pietramala =

American lacrosse player and coach

Biographical details
- Born: 1967 (age 58–59); Hicksville, New York

Playing career
- 1986–1989: Johns Hopkins
- Position: Defenseman

Coaching career (HC unless noted)
- 1990: Gilman (Md.) (assistant)
- 1991: Johns Hopkins (assistant)
- 1992–1993: Penn (assistant)
- 1994: Loyola (assistant)
- 1995–1997: Johns Hopkins (DC)
- 1998–2000: Cornell
- 2001–2020: Johns Hopkins
- 2022–2023: Syracuse (DC)
- 2024–: North Carolina (DC)
- U.S. Lacrosse Hall of Fame; Inducted in 2004

Dave Pietramala (born 1967) is the defensive coordinator for the University of North Carolina men's lacrosse team and the former head coach for the Johns Hopkins University men's lacrosse team. He also served as the DC for the Syracuse University men's lacrosse team. He is widely regarded as one of the greatest defensemen in lacrosse history, and is a member of the U.S. Lacrosse Hall of Fame. He is the only person to win a men's lacrosse NCAA national championship as both a player and coach, and the only person to be named both player and coach of the year.

== Playing career ==
Born in Hicksville, New York, he went to St. Mary's High School. Pietramala chose to attend Johns Hopkins University at the advice of his father, George, who wanted him to play for the lacrosse powerhouse. Dave Pietramala stated that he originally intended to go to the University of Maryland: "I loved Coach [Dick] Edell and loved Maryland ... I grew up a huge basketball fan and they had Len Bias, Keith Gatlin and Lefty Driesell. I thought it was all set. I was going to Maryland."

At Hopkins, Pietramala was a member of the 1987 national championship team. He won the Schmeisser Award as the nation's top defenseman in 1988 and 1989 and the 1989 Enners Award as the nation's top player. He was also named a first-team All American three times while at Hopkins.

Pietramala also played at the club level for the storied Mount Washington Lacrosse Club in the 1990s, the professional level for the Pittsburgh Bulls in the Major Indoor Lacrosse League, and nationally for the United States men's national lacrosse team. He won two world championships in the International Lacrosse Federation World Championship, was named All-World in both 1990 and 1994, and Best and Fairest Player (MVP) in 1990.

In addition to these awards, Pietramala was named to the NCAA Silver Anniversary Team in 1995, the All-Time Johns Hopkins Team, and Lacrosse Magazine's All-Century Team. He was inducted into the National Lacrosse Hall of Fame in 2004.

== Coaching career ==
After 1991, Pietramala took jobs as an assistant coach at Gilman School, Johns Hopkins University, the University of Pennsylvania, and Loyola College before returning to Johns Hopkins as the defensive coordinator in 1995. In 1998 he took over the head coaching job at Cornell University, where he was named the national Coach of the Year in 2000.

In 2001, he took the head coaching position at his alma mater, where he revitalized the Hopkins program. In his 20 years at the helm, the Blue Jays had a 207–93 record, 18 NCAA tournament appearances, six NCAA Final Four appearances, national championship game appearances in 2003 and 2008, and the 2005 and 2007 national championships.

In April 2020, after the 2020 season was cut short by the COVID-19 pandemic, Johns Hopkins announced that they had mutually agreed to part with Pietramala, ending his tenure as the head coach.

Pietramala joined the coaching staff of Boys' Latin School of Maryland in the spring of 2021, assisting on the defensive side of the ball and coaching his two sons, Dominic and Nicholas. An up and down regular season gave way to a hot playoff streak that saw the sixth-seeded Lakers win the MIAA A Conference championship, defeating Archbishop Spalding in the finals.

On Monday, June 14, 2021, it was announced that Pietramala would be joining the Syracuse University coaching staff, led by Gary Gait, as their defensive coordinator for the spring 2022 season. The unification of this tandem gave the Syracuse coaching staff, arguably, the best offensive and defensive players in the history of the sport. He inherited a defense that was one of worst at Syracuse and struggled to dramatically improve the squad. During his short tenure, the Orange defense could stop opponent's best option but allowed secondary scorers to thrive.

After two seasons working with Gait at Syracuse, Pietramala left for UNC to join Joe Breschi's staff.

== Head coaching record ==
Record table
Season	Team	Overall	Conference	Standing	Postseason
Cornell Big Red (Ivy League) (1998–2000)
1998	Cornell	6–7	4–2	3rd	
1999	Cornell	7–6	4–2	T–2nd	
2000	Cornell	10–4	5–1	2nd	NCAA Division I first round
Cornell:		23–17 (.575)	13–5 (.722)		
Johns Hopkins Blue Jays (NCAA independent) (2001–2014)
2001	Johns Hopkins	8–4			NCAA Division I quarterfinals
2002	Johns Hopkins	12–2			NCAA Division I semifinals
2003	Johns Hopkins	14–2			NCAA Division I runner-up
2004	Johns Hopkins	13–2			NCAA Division I semifinals
2005	Johns Hopkins	16–0			NCAA Division I champion
2006	Johns Hopkins	9–5			NCAA Division I quarterfinals
2007	Johns Hopkins	13–4			NCAA Division I champion
2008	Johns Hopkins	11–6			NCAA Division I runner-up
2009	Johns Hopkins	10–5			NCAA Division I quarterfinals
2010	Johns Hopkins	7–8			NCAA Division I first round
2011	Johns Hopkins	13–3			NCAA Division I quarterfinals
2012	Johns Hopkins	12–4			NCAA Division I quarterfinals
2013	Johns Hopkins	9–5			
2014	Johns Hopkins	11–5			NCAA Division I quarterfinals
Johns Hopkins Blue Jays (Big Ten Conference) (2015–2020)
2015	Johns Hopkins	11–7	4–1	T–1st	NCAA Division I semifinals
2016	Johns Hopkins	8–7	3–2	T–2nd	NCAA Division I first round
2017	Johns Hopkins	8–7	3–2	T–2nd	NCAA Division I first round
2018	Johns Hopkins	12–5	3–2	T–2nd	NCAA Division I quarterfinals
2019	Johns Hopkins	8–8	3–2	T–2nd	NCAA Division I first round
2020	Johns Hopkins	2–4	0–0		Season canceled due to COVID-19
Johns Hopkins:		207–93 (.690)	16–9 (.640)		
Total:		230–110 (.676)			
National champion Postseason invitational champion Conference regular season champion Conference regular season and conference tournament champion Division regular season champion Division regular season and conference tournament champion Conference tournament champion
