= 1980 NCAA Division I lacrosse tournament =

1980 NCAA Division I men's lacrosse tournament
- Dates: May 21–31, 1980
- Teams: 8
- Finals site: Schoellkopf Field, (New York (state)) Ithaca, New York
- Champions: Johns Hopkins (4th title)
- Runner-up: Virginia (2nd title game)
- Semifinalists: North Carolina (1st Final Four); Syracuse (1st Final Four)
- Winning coach: Henry Ciccarone (2nd title)
- MOP: Jim Bidne, Johns Hopkins
- Attendance: 7,557 finals 23,046 total
- Top scorer: Brendan Schneck, Johns Hopkins (16 goals)

The 1980 NCAA Division I lacrosse tournament was the 10th annual tournament hosted by the National Collegiate Athletic Association to determine the team champion of men's college lacrosse among its Division I programs to end the 1980 NCAA Division I lacrosse season.

Two-time defending champions Johns Hopkins defeated Virginia in the championship game, 9–8 in double-overtime. This was the Blue Jays' third straight and fourth overall NCAA national title.

The championship game was played at Schoellkopf Field at Cornell University in Ithaca, New York, with 7,557 fans in attendance.

== Overview ==
Eight NCAA Division I college men's lacrosse teams met after having played their way through a regular season, and for some, a conference tournament.

In the final, Hopkins came back from an 8–6 deficit with nine minutes left to play. Attackman Jeff Harris took a pass from Jim Bidne in front of the Virginia goal and rifled a shot over the left shoulder of the Cavalier's goalie with 0:48 to play in the second overtime to give Hopkins the team's third straight national title. Virginia had defeated the Blue Jays earlier in the year 12–9, ending Hopkins’ then 25 game win streak.

Following the tournament, National lacrosse champ Johns Hopkins dominated the Division I All American squad with eight total selections. Goalie Mike Federico, defenseman Mark Greenberg and midfielder Brendan Schneck repeated as first team choices, while Jeff Cook made the second team attack squad.

Virginia was notable in this tournament for playing overtime games in all three of their contests, including the two overtime game against Hopkins in the finals. Hopkins players Wayne Davis and Ned Radebaugh were both sidelined in that game. Virginia took advantage at the face off with Cavs junior Steve Kraus winning 17 of his 20 faceoffs. The winning goal by Jeff Harris in the second overtime period gave Hopkins the first-ever third straight NCAA title a feat which would not be duplicated for 10 more years.

== Bracket ==
Quarterfinals; May 21
2	Johns Hopkins	16
7	Harvard	12
3	Syracuse	12
6	Washington and Lee	4
5	North Carolina	18
4	Navy	11
1	Virginia	9^{(i)}
8	Cornell	8

Semifinals; May 24
2	Johns Hopkins	18
3	Syracuse	11
5	North Carolina	10
1	Virginia	11^{(i)}

Championship; May 31
2	Johns Hopkins (14–1)	9^{(ii)}
1	Virginia (12–2)	8

- ^{(i)} one overtime
- ^{(ii)} two overtimes

== Box scores ==
=== Finals ===
Team	1	2	3	4	OT1	OT2	Total
Johns Hopkins	4	0	2	2	0	1	9
Virginia	1	0	6	1	0	0	8
Johns Hopkins scoring – Jim Bidne 3, Brendan Schneck 2, Henry Ciccarone, Jim Zaffuto, Jeff Harris, Wayne Davis; Virginia scoring – John Driscoll 2, Sonny Esposito, Mike Caravana, Matt Rainis, Lou Ruland, Randy Natoli, Rich Riccardi; Shots: Virginia 35, Johns Hopkins 25; Saves: Johns Hopkins - Mike Federico 12, Virginia - Gregory 5

=== Semifinals ===
Team	1	2	3	4	Total
Johns Hopkins	5	3	5	5	18
Syracuse	3	3	2	3	11
Johns Hopkins scoring – Brendan Schneck 4, Jim Zaffuto 3, Jeff Harris 2, Henry Ciccarone 2, Jim Bidne 2, Rich Wilkens 2, Gary Benninghoff 2, Howard Offit; Syracuse scoring – Tom Donahue 2, Doug Sedgwick 2, Marty Whipple 2, Larry Collins, Ralph Spinola, Brad Short, Scott Frost, Jim Trowbridge; Shots: Johns Hopkins 54, Syracuse 28

Team	1	2	3	4	OT	Total
Virginia	4	1	3	2	1	11
North Carolina	2	5	1	2	0	10
Virginia scoring – Randy Natoli 3, John Driscoll 2, Ray Giusto, Matt Rainis, Tim O’Shea, Sonny Esposito, Lou Ruland, Rick Giusto; North Carolina scoring – Mike Burnett 3, Monty Hill 3, Terry Martinello 2, Kevin Griswold 2; Shots: Virginia 41, North Carolina 35

=== Quarterfinals ===
Team	1	2	3	4	Total
Johns Hopkins	1	5	4	6	16
Harvard	3	3	2	4	12
Johns Hopkins scoring – Brendan Schneck 3, Jim Zaffuto 3, Wayne Davis 3, Jim Bidne 2, Jeff Cook, Joe Ciletti, Jeff Harris, Henry Ciccarone, Rich Wilkens; Harvard scoring – Brendan Meagher 4, Mike Davis 3, David Wigglesworth 2, Mike Rainaldi 2, Gary Pedroni; Shots: Johns Hopkins 44, Harvard 41

Team	1	2	3	4	Total
Syracuse	1	5	3	3	12
Washington and Lee	1	1	0	2	4
Syracuse scoring – Brad Short 4, Tim O’Hara 3, Doug Sedgwick 2, Ralph Spinola 2, Pat O’Hara; Washington and Lee scoring – Mike Pressler 2, Jay Foster, George Santos; Shots: Syracuse 33, Washington and Lee 30

Team	1	2	3	4	Total
North Carolina	3	4	5	6	18
Navy	1	3	1	6	11
North Carolina scoring – Monty Hill 3, Kevin Griswold 3, Terry Martinello 3, Mike Burnett 2, John Basil 2, John Schipper, Bob Volker, Jeff Homire, Peter Voelkel, Doug Hall; Navy scoring – Syd Abernethy 4, Mike Buzzell 3, Rich Wehman 2, Ed Mapes, William Anderson; Shots: Navy 45, North Carolina 36

Team	1	2	3	4	OT1	Total
Virginia	1	3	3	1	1	9
Cornell	5	0	2	1	0	8
Virginia scoring – Randy Natoli 3, John Driscoll 3, Mike Caravana, Matt Rainis, Steve Kraus; Cornell scoring – Charlie Wood 3, Joe Taylor, Paul Roland, Bruce Reitenbach, Norman Engelke, Matt Crowley; Shots: Virginia 41, Cornell 29

== Outstanding players ==
- Jim Bidne, Attack, Johns Hopkins, tournament Most Outstanding Player

=== Leading scorers ===
Name	GP	G	A	Pts
Brendan Schneck, Johns Hopkins	3	9	7	16
Tim O’Hara, Syracuse	2	3	8	11
Jim Bidne, Johns Hopkins	3	7	3	10
Jim Zaffuto, Johns Hopkins	3	7	3	10
Mike Burnett, North Carolina	2	5	5	10
Dave Huntley, Johns Hopkins	2	9	1	10
Ron Martinello, Maryland	3	8	2	10
John Lamon, Maryland	2	7	3	10
Ned Radebaugh, Johns Hopkins	3	5	4	9
Mike Chanenchuk, Navy	2	3	6	9
Jeff Harris, Johns Hopkins	3	4	5	9

== See also ==
- 1980 NCAA Division II lacrosse tournament
- 1980 NCAA Division III lacrosse tournament (inaugural edition)
