= 2015 NCAA Division I men's lacrosse tournament =

- Teams: 18
- Finals site: Lincoln Financial Field, Philadelphia, PA
- Champions: Denver (1st title)
- Runner-up: Maryland (12th title game)
- Semifinalists: Johns Hopkins (29th Final Four); Notre Dame (5th Final Four)
- Winning coach: Bill Tierney (7th title)
- MOP: Wesley Berg, Denver
- Attendance: 29,123 semi-finals 24,215 finals 53,338 total
- Top scorer: Wesley Berg, Denver (16 goals)

The 2015 NCAA Division I Men's Lacrosse Championship was the 45th annual single-elimination tournament to determine the national championship for National Collegiate Athletic Association (NCAA) Division I men's college lacrosse. Eighteen teams competed in the tournament, selected by winning an automatic qualifying conference tournament or as an at-large team based upon their performance during the regular season. The 18 teams were announced on May 3.

== Tournament overview ==
The first round and play-in games were played at campus sites. The quarterfinal games were played on May 16 and 17, 2015 at Navy–Marine Corps Memorial Stadium in Annapolis, Maryland (hosted by the United States Naval Academy), and Sports Authority Field at Mile High in Denver (hosted by the University of Denver).

The semifinals were played on May 23, 2015, and the championship on May 25, 2015. The semifinals and championship were held at Lincoln Financial Field in Philadelphia, and were hosted by Drexel University.

Schools from 10 conferences, the America East Conference, Atlantic Coast Conference (ACC), Big East Conference, Colonial Athletic Association (CAA), Big Ten Conference, Ivy League, Metro Atlantic Athletic Conference (MAAC), Northeast Conference (NEC), Patriot League, and Southern Conference (SoCon) were eligible for automatic bids into the tournament by winning their respective conference tournaments, leaving eight remaining at-large bids for top ranked teams.

Albany (America East), Bryant (NEC), Denver (Big East), Johns Hopkins (Big Ten), Towson (CAA), Colgate (Patriot), Syracuse (ACC), Yale (Ivy), High Point (Southern Conference) and Marist (MAAC) were the 10 schools that received the tournament's automatic bids.

== Teams ==
Seed	School	Conference	Berth Type	RPI	Record
1	Notre Dame	ACC	At-large	2	10–2
2	Syracuse	ACC	Automatic	1	12–2
3	North Carolina	ACC	At-large	3	12–3
4	Denver	Big East	Automatic	5	13–2
5	Duke	ACC	At-large	4	12–5
6	Maryland	Big Ten	Automatic	7	12–3
7	Virginia	ACC	At-large	6	10–4
8	Cornell	Ivy	At-large	10	10–5
	Albany	America East	Automatic	8	15–2
	Yale	Ivy	Automatic	9	11–4
	Johns Hopkins	Big Ten	At-large	11	9–6
	Colgate	Patriot	Automatic	13	10–5
	Brown	Ivy	At-large	14	12–4
	Ohio State	Big Ten	At-large	15	11–6
	Towson	CAA	Automatic	20	11–5
	Marist	MAAC	Automatic	21	13–3
	High Point	Southern	Automatic	27	10–6
	Bryant	Northeast	Automatic	28	8–9

== Results ==
The Denver Pioneers beat Maryland 10–5 for the school's first national championship, and also the first-ever NCAA men's lacrosse title for a school located outside the Eastern Time Zone.

Wesley Berg was named the tournament's Most Outstanding Player, scoring the overtime winning goal in the semifinals. This was Bill Tierney's first championship since he won with Princeton in 2001, and seventh overall coaching title.

== Bracket ==
Play-in game May 6
Towson	10
High Point	8

Play-in game May 6
Bryant	6
Marist	10

First Round; May 9–10
1	Notre Dame	12
Towson	10
8	Cornell	10
Albany	19
4	Denver	15
Brown	9
5	Duke	11
Ohio State	16
3	North Carolina	19
Colgate	12
6	Maryland	8
Yale	7
7	Virginia	7
Johns Hopkins	19
2	Syracuse	20
Marist	8

Quarterfinals; May 16–17; Sports Authority Field at Mile High; Navy Marine Corps Stadium
1	Notre Dame	14
Albany	10
4	Denver	15
Ohio State	13
3	North Carolina	7
6	Maryland	14
Johns Hopkins	16
2	Syracuse	15

Semifinals; May 23; Lincoln Financial Field
1	Notre Dame	10
4	Denver	11*
6	Maryland	12
Johns Hopkins	11

Final; May 25; Lincoln Financial Field
4	Denver	10
6	Maryland	5

* = Overtime

== All–Tournament ==
- Wesley Berg, A, Denver (Most Outstanding Player)
- Trevor Baptiste, M, Denver
- Ryan LaPlante, G, Denver
- Zach Miller, M, Denver
- Mike Riis, LSM, Denver
- Kyle Bernlohr, G, Maryland
- Matt Neufeldt, LSM, Maryland
- Matt Rambo, A, Maryland
- Sergio Perkovic, M, Notre Dame
- John Crawley, D, Johns Hopkins
