= List of National Lacrosse Hall of Fame members =

The members of the National Lacrosse Hall of Fame are inducted by US Lacrosse and are enshrined at the National Lacrosse Hall of Fame. Members have been inducted into the hall of fame annually since 1957. The National Lacrosse Hall of Fame and Museum moved to US Lacrosse's new headquarters in Sparks, Maryland in 2016.

Individuals are nominated in four distinct categories: players, coaches, contributors, or officials. Each year, the nominating and voting process takes place from January through April. The annual class of inductees is publicly announced over Memorial Day weekend in May, in conjunction with the NCAA Men's Championships held the same weekend. They are then officially inducted at a ceremony in September or October.

In 1992, Rosabelle Sinclair, a pioneer of the women's game, was the first woman to be inducted into the Hall of Fame. Since Sinclair, there have been 76 other woman inductees, and, combined with 287 men, there are 364 total inductees as of the 2010 class.

== Hall of Fame inductees ==
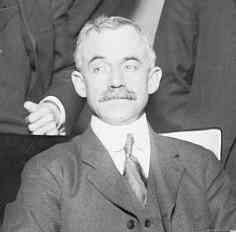
Cyrus Miller, charter class (1957)

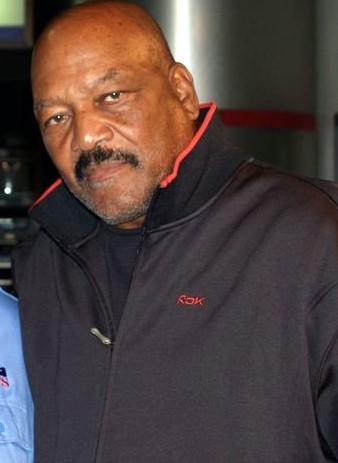
Jim Brown, class of 1983

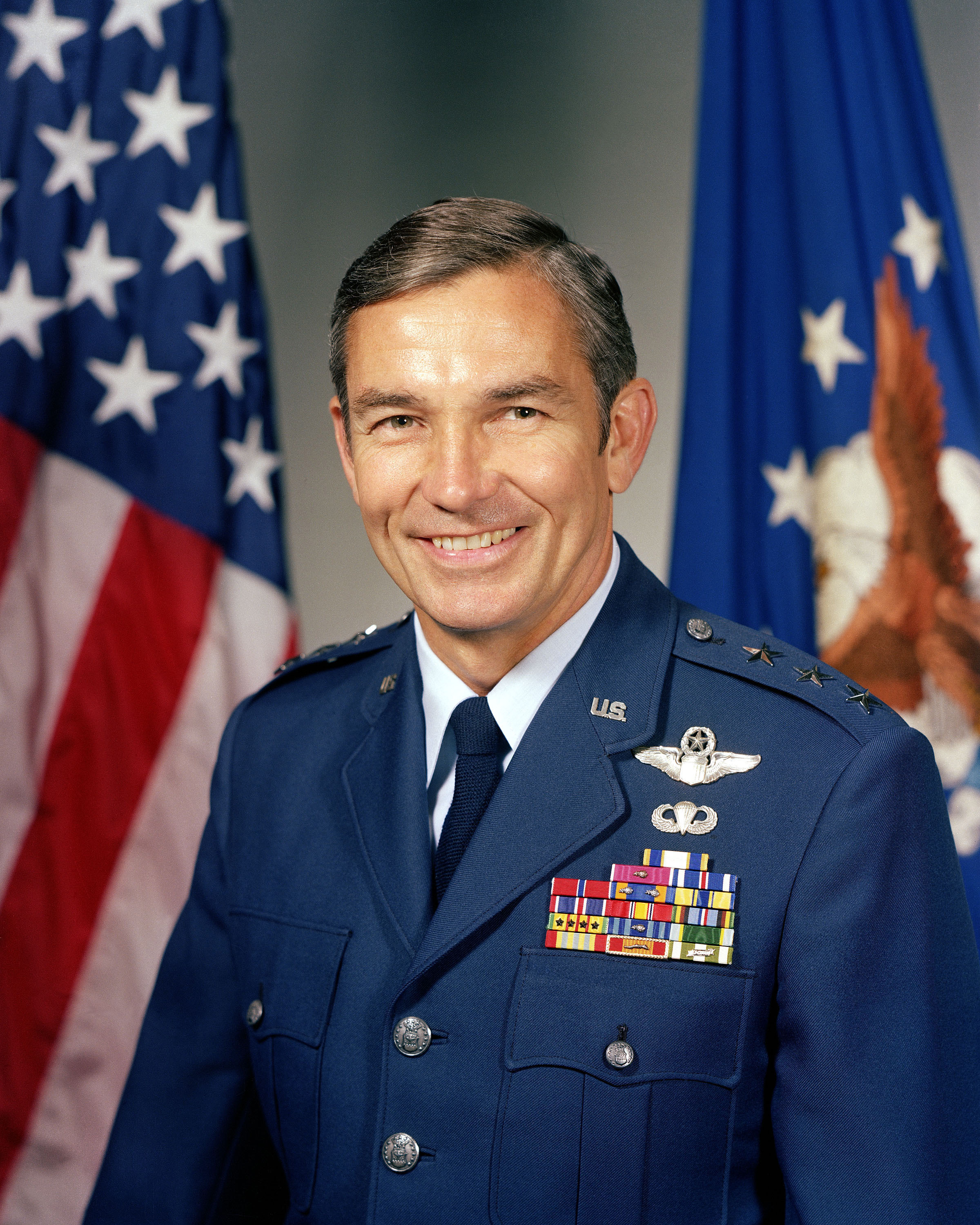
Robert E. Kelley, class of 1984

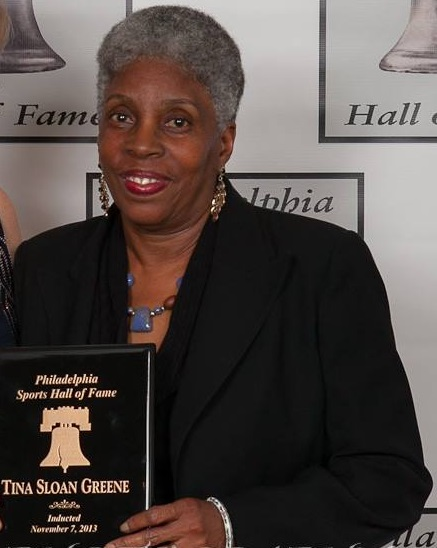
Tina Sloan Green, class of 1997

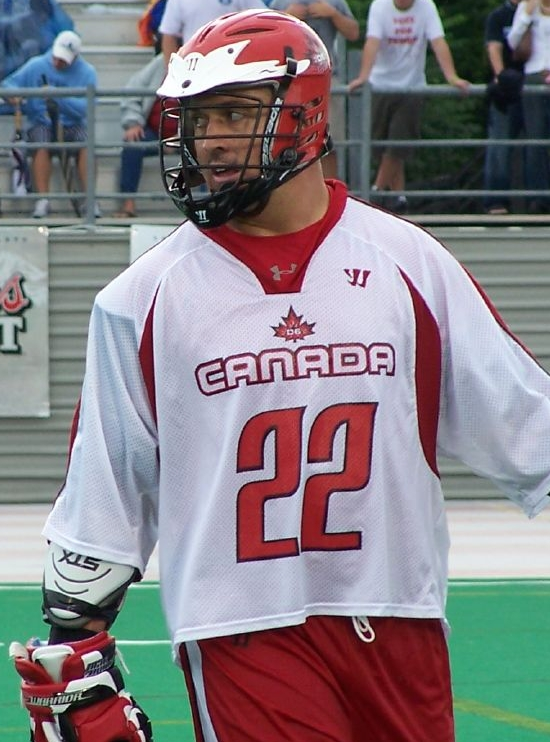
Gary Gait, class of 2005

Class	Individual	Role	School/affiliation
1957	Cox, Laurie D.	Contributor	Harvard University
1957	Marsters, Charles E.	Player	Harvard University
1957	Miller, Cyrus C.	Player	New York University
1957	Taylor, Roy	Player	Cornell University
1957	Schmeisser, William C.	Player/Coach	Johns Hopkins University
1958	Abercrombie, Ronald T.	Player	Johns Hopkins University
1958	Brisotti, Albert A.	Player	New York University
1958	Collins, Carlton P.	Player	Cornell University
1958	Kirkpatrick, Andrew M.	Player	St. John's College
1959	Starzenski, Victor	Contributor	Stevens Institute of Technology
1959	Barnard, Norris C.	Official	Swarthmore College
1959	Brower, Cyril D.	Player	Hobart College
1959	Fries, Waldemar H.	Player	Cornell University
1959	Hawkins, Russell S.	Player	New York University
1959	Harkinson Hudgins, William	Player	Johns Hopkins University
1959	Knipp, John C.	Player	Johns Hopkins University
1959	Truitt, Reginald V.	Player	University of Maryland
1959	Wylie, William C.	Player	University of Maryland
	Davis, William A.	Player	No affiliation
1960	Kennedy, J. Sarsfield	Player	Crescent Athletic Club
1960	Lydecker, Irving B.	Player	Syracuse University
1960	Miller, Leon A.	Player	Carlisle Indian School
1960	Hewitt Paige, John	Player	Colgate University
1960	Scott, Herbert T.	Player	Crescent Athletic Club
1960	Touchstone, F. Morris	Player/Coach	George Williams
1961	Blake, Avery F.	Player	Swarthmore College
1961	Fitch, Frederic A.	Player	Syracuse University
1961	Maddren, William	Player	Johns Hopkins University
1961	Mallonee, C. Gardener	Player	Johns Hopkins University
1961	Moore, William H.	Player	Johns Hopkins University
1961	Stuart, Edward M.	Player	Johns Hopkins University
1961	Harkness, William J.	Player	Princeton University
1961	Sutherland, Conrad J.	Player	Princeton University
1962	Billing, Fred C.	Player	United States Naval Academy
1962	Ford, Henry Crawford	Player	Swarthmore College
1962	Meistrell, Harland W.	Player	Princeton University
1962	Morrill, Jr., William K.	Player	Johns Hopkins University
1962	Ross, Victor K.	Player	Syracuse University
1962	Turnbull, Douglass Clayland	Player	Johns Hopkins University
1962	Norris, Walter O.	Player	St. John's College
1963	Alexander, Fred C.	Player	Harvard University
1963	Biddison, Thomas N.	Player	Johns Hopkins University
1963	Faber, John Edgar	Player	University of Maryland
1963	Hartdegen, Carl	Player	Lehigh University
1963	Pool, Robert P.	Player	St. John's College
1963	Wilson, Harry E.	Player	United States Military Academy
1963	Stranahan, Jason G.	Contributor	Union College
1963	Thomsen, Ferris	Player/Coach	St. John's College
1964	Baker, Henry Fenmore	Player	Swarthmore College
1964	Breyer, Frank G.	Player	Johns Hopkins University
1964	Collins, Thomas Walter	Player	Yale University
1964	Kraus, Francis Lucas	Player	Hobart College
1964	Moore, Miller	Player	University of Pennsylvania
1964	O'Connor, Claxton J.	Player	St. John's University
1964	Powell, Edwin Emerson	Player	University of Maryland
1965	Deckman, Joseph H.	Player	University of Maryland
1965	Frank, Henry Samuel	Player	Johns Hopkins University
1965	Heagy, Albert B.	Player	University of Maryland
1965	Julien, Joseph J.	Player	Rutgers University
1965	Lamb, Philip E.	Player	Swarthmore College
1965	Thiel, Glenn N.	Player	Syracuse University
1965	Turnbull, Jack I.	Player	Johns Hopkins University
1966	Erlanger, Milton S.	Player	Johns Hopkins University
1966	Evans, William W.	Player	University of Maryland
1966	Flippin, Royce N.	Player	United States Naval Academy
1966	Gould, Avery H.	Player	Dartmouth College
1966	Kelly, Donaldson Naylor	Player	Johns Hopkins University
1966	Lotz, Edwin L.	Player	St. John's University
1966	MacIntyre, Malcolm A.	Player	Yale University
1967	Boucher, John W.	Player	St. John's College
1967	Guild, Lorne Randolf	Player	Johns Hopkins University
1967	Jenkins, Victor J.	Player	Syracuse University
1967	Linkous, Fred Cecil	Player	University of Maryland
1967	Twitchell, Albert W.	Player	Rutgers University
1968	Auer, Gaylord R.	Player	Baltimore City College
1968	Gilmore, Morris D.	Player	United States Naval Academy
1968	Igelhart, James D.	Player	Baltimore Athletic Club
1968	Lotz, Philip Lee	Player	St. John's University
1968	Pugh, Gordon S.	Player	University of Maryland
1968	Smith, Winthrop A.	Player	Yale University
1969	Ellinger, Charles F.	Player	University of Maryland
1969	Kelly, John F.	Player	University of Maryland
1969	LaMotte, F. Gibbs	Player	Mount Washington Lacrosse Club
1969	Armstrong, Gordan A.	Player	Johns Hopkins University
1969	Kelly, Caleb Redgrave	Player	Johns Hopkins University
1969	Logan, William Frances	Player	Johns Hopkins University
1969	Strobhar, Thomas S.	Player	Johns Hopkins University
1969	Wyatt, Frederick A.	Player	Union College
1970	Marty, Ivan M.	Player	University of Maryland
1970	Stude, Fritz R.	Player	Johns Hopkins University
1970	Truxton, Thomas	Player	United States Naval Academy
	Myers, Howard	Coach	University of Virginia
1971	Ferris, Carlton J.	Player	Hobart College
1971	Hewitt, Frederic M.	Player	University of Maryland
1971	Spring, Arthur F.	Player	United States Naval Academy
1971	Yearley, Church	Player	Johns Hopkins University
	Ritch, Wiliam N.	Coach	Syracuse University
1972	Dobbin, William H.	Player	Hobart College
1972	Latimer, George Alvah	Player	Rutgers University
1972	Sothoron, Norwood	Player	University of Maryland
1972	Tolson, John C.	Player	Johns Hopkins University
	Bilderback, Willis P.	Coach	Rutgers University
1973	Beggs, Harry G.	Player	Yale University
1973	Campbell, Tyler	Player	Princeton University
1973	Lang, John D.	Player	Johns Hopkins University
1973	Smith, Everett W.	Player	St. John's College
1974	Christhilf, John F.	Player	University of Maryland
1974	Donohue, John C.	Player	St. John's College
1974	Kaestner, Henry Benjamin	Player	Johns Hopkins University
1974	McAnally, Charles G.	Player	University of Pennsylvania
1974	Robbins, Louis A.	Player	Syracuse University
1975	Adams, James F.	Player	Johns Hopkins University
1975	Bunting, Lloyd M.	Player	Johns Hopkins University
1975	Chambers, Lee J.H.	Player	United States Naval Academy
1975	Hartinger, James V.	Player	United States Military Academy
1975	Hooper, William U.	Player	University of Virginia
1976	Budnitz, Emil A.	Contributor	Johns Hopkins University
1976	Kappler, James R.	Player	University of Maryland
1976	Lindsay, Stewart	Player	Syracuse University
1976	Scott, Robert H.	Coach	Johns Hopkins University
1977	Chandlee, George M.	Contributor	Yale University
1977	Lamond, Angus	Player	St. John's College
1977	Pearre, Sifford	Player	Johns Hopkins University
1977	Webster, James McCormick	Player	Johns Hopkins University
	Tunstall, Brooke W.	Coach	Johns Hopkins University
1978	Fitch, Hebert T.	Player	Hobart College
1978	Howard, John D.	Player	Washington College
1978	Lang, Millard T.	Player	Johns Hopkins University
1978	Morrill, Sr., William K.	Player	Johns Hopkins University
1978	Smith, Fred B.	Player	Johns Hopkins University
1978	Wicker, Charles E.	Player	University of Maryland
1979	Blake, Jr., Avery F.	Player	Swarthmore College
1979	Seivold, Joseph	Player	Washington College
1980	Beardmore, Clayton A.	Player	University of Maryland
1980	Fewster, William L.	Player	Johns Hopkins University
1980	Krongard, Alvin B.	Player	Princeton University
1980	Miser, Robert S.	Player	United States Military Academy
1980	Roberts, Milton R.	Player	Johns Hopkins University
1981	Fuller, William L.	Player	Syracuse University
1981	Greene, Melvin R.	Player	Johns Hopkins University
1981	Hahn, Donald P.	Player	Princeton University
1981	Keating, James H.	Player	University of Maryland
1981	Lewis, James C.	Player	United States Naval Academy
1981	Urso, Frank	Player	University of Maryland
1982	Schmidt, Austin F.	Player	Johns Hopkins University
1982	Allner, Frederick A.	Player	Princeton University
1982	Willis, Ralph N.	Player	Princeton University
1983	Brown, Jim	Player	Syracuse University
1983	Moran, Richie	Player	University of Maryland
1983	Webb, Norman A.	Player	United States Military Academy
1984	Gaines, Leonard T.	Player	Princeton University
1984	Kelley, Robert E.	Player	Rutgers University
1984	Shoop, William P.	Player	Rensselaer Polytechnic Institute
1984	Swindell, Philip W.	Player	Johns Hopkins University
1984	Sandell, Robert E.	Player/Official	Johns Hopkins University
1985	Richard F. Garber	Coach	Springfield College
1985	Kaestner, Benjamin H.	Player	Johns Hopkins University
1985	Cowan, Joseph W.	Player	Johns Hopkins University
1985	Krongard, Howard J.	Player	Princeton University
1985	Simmons, John W.	Player	University of Maryland
1986	Corcoran, Joseph W.	Coach	Ithaca College
1986	Cramblet, Peter B.	Player	United States Military Academy
1986	Postel, Thomas J.	Player	C. W. Post
1986	Wilder, Joseph R.	Player	Dartmouth College
1987	Ciccarone, Henry A.	Player	Johns Hopkins University
1987	Fish, Henry E.	Player	Princeton University
1987	Fraser, Ronald A.	Player	Syracuse University
1987	Merrick, Robert G.	Player	Yale University
1987	Sollers, Joseph S.	Player	Johns Hopkins University
1987	Thomas, William F.	Player	Western Maryland College
1988	Betz, Ernest J.	Player	University of Maryland
1988	Cafaro, Thomas R.	Player	United States Military Academy
1988	Clark, Charles B.	Player	Washington University in St. Louis
1988	Cohen, Harvey	Player	Lafayette College
1988	Heim, John C.	Player	University of Maryland
1988	Hilliard, Milton E.	Player	Cornell University
1988	Hopkins, Heather R.	Player	Johns Hopkins University
1989	Cohen, Bruce L.	Player	Cornell University
1989	Eldredge, Peter H.	Player	University of Virginia
1989	Hayes, Thomas R.	Player	Pennsylvania State University
1989	Russell, C. Mason	Player	Annapolis High School
1989	Tamulevich, Carl J.	Player	United States Naval Academy
1989	Thomas, John	Player	Johns Hopkins University
1990	Darcangelo, James M.	Player	Towson University
1990	Griebe, Robert E.	Player	Towson University
1990	Lowe, Alan E.	Player	University of Maryland
1990	Marshall, A. Arlyn	Player	Johns Hopkins University
1990	Smith, Neville K.	Player	Connecticut Valley Lacrosse Club
1990	Wood, L. Ray	Player	Washington College
1991	Albertson, Donald G.	Player	United States Naval Academy
1991	Bauer, Theodore W.	Player	Washington and Lee University
1991	French, Michael G.	Player	Cornell University
1991	Kowalchuk, Richard M.	Player	Johns Hopkins University
1991	Simmons, Jr., Roy D.	Player	Syracuse University
1992	Chadwick, Sterling H.	Player	Washington and Lee University
1992	Cuozzo, Joseph A.	Player	State University of New York at Cortland
1992	Lyons, Oren R.	Player	Syracuse University
1992	McEneaney, Eamon	Player	Cornell University
1992	Radebaugh, J. Douglass	Player	University of Maryland
1992	Orman, Ray Van	Player	Cornell University
1992	Sinclair, Rosabelle	Contributor	St Leonards School
1993	Barry, Joyce Cran	Contributor	Wycombe Abbey
1993	Boyd, Margaret	Contributor	Wycombe Abbey
1993	Corrigan, Eugene F.	Contributor	Duke University
1993	Pitts, Jacquelin	Player	St. Lawrence University
1993	DiMaggio, Agostino M.	Player	Washington College
1993	Henrickson, Robert L.	Player	Cornell University
1993	Lichtfuss, Ernest J.	Player	Washington and Lee University
1993	O'Neill, Michael J.	Player	Johns Hopkins University
1993	Richey, Elizabeth	Player	Radcliffe College
1993	Schreiber, Douglas M.	Player	University of Maryland
1993	Vache, Jane L.	Contributor	West Chester University
1993	Cross, Suzanne R.	Contributor	No affiliation
1994	Allen, Virginia	Coach	Swarthmore High School
1994	Shellenberger, Betty	Player	Agnes Irwin
1994	Burke, James E.	Player	State University of New York at Cortland
1994	Conner, Jay D.	Player	University of Virginia
1994	Eisenbrandt, Frederick H.	Player	Duke University
1994	Haussermann, Caroline	Player	Virginia Women's Lacrosse Association
1994	Kane, Christopher J.	Player	Cornell University
1994	Messere, Michael A.	Player	State University of New York at Cortland
1994	Schuyler, Gretchen	Player	Boston University
1994	Oswald, Jane	Player/Coach	Beaver College
1995	No inductions in this year		
1996	Beroza, William S.	Player	Roanoke College
1996	Heinze, Kathleen A.	Player	Dartford College
1996	Marino, William G.	Player	Cornell University
1996	Matthews, Leslie S.	Player	Johns Hopkins University
1996	Semanik, Mary Fetter	Player	Philadelphia Women's Lacrosse Association
1996	Tammaro, Angela E.	Player	Boston University
1996	Valestra, John M.	Player	Rutgers University
1996	Waldvogel, Michael J.	Player	State University of New York at Cortland
1996	Wolstenholme, Judith S.	Player	Ursinus College
1997	Rogers, Nolan H.	Contributor	Duke University
1997	Green, Tina Sloan	Player	West Chester University
1997	Kowalski, Stanley F.	Player	State University of New York at Cortland
1997	Potter, James L.	Player	University of Virginia
1997	Schneck, Brendan M.	Player	Johns Hopkins University
1997	Russell, Enid Clinchard	Player	Ursinus College
1997	Smith, Janet A.	Player	Ursinus College
1997	Smith, Nathalie	Player	Bouvé College
1997	Sombrotto, Vincent J.	Player	Hofstra University
1997	Wheeler, Helena	Player	Westchester Lacrosse Association
1998	Driscoll, John F.	Player	University of Virginia
1998	Greenberg, Mark J.	Player	Johns Hopkins University
1998	Lanzl, Connie Burgess	Player	Wilson College
1998	Longstreth, Barbara H.	Player	Beaver College
1998	Murphy, Charles D.	Contributor	Princeton University
1998	Willetts, Alice Putnam	Contributor	Philadelphia Team
1998	Rocha, Candace Finn	Player	Pennsylvania State University
1998	Rule, Robert J.	Player	Cornell University
1998	Schooley, Susanne M.	Player	Glassboro State College
1998	Williams, Elizabeth F.	Player	University of Pennsylvania
1998	Urick, David J.	Player	State University of New York at Cortland
1999	Cross, Dee Ficther	Player	Shippensburg University
1999	Farrell, Michael C.	Player	University of Maryland
1999	Federico, Michael S.	Player	Johns Hopkins University
1999	Finley, Richard C.	Player	Syracuse University
1999	Keigler, Thomas N.	Player	Washington and Lee University
1999	Garinger, Marjorie D.	Player	Ursinus College
1999	Stahl, Sue Day	Player	Ursinus College
1999	Tyler, Suzanne	Coach	Northeastern University
1999	Wehrum, Paul	Coach	State University of New York at Cortland
1999	Walchak, Valerie	Contributor	West Chester University
2000	Buzzell, Michael A.	Player	United States Naval Academy
2000	Coakley, Anne O.	Player	Boston Women's Lacrosse Association
2000	Cook, Kevin A.	Player	Cornell University
2000	Dougherty, Betsy Williams	Player	Pennsylvania State University
2000	Delaney-Scheetz, Susan	Player	West Chester University
2000	Kuklick, Janice Rensimer	Player	West Chester University
2000	Roth, Linda Swarts	Player	West Chester University
2000	Patterson, John Wesley	Player	Springfield College
2000	Quinn, Lawrence J.	Player	Johns Hopkins University
2000	Smith, Edward Doyle	Contributor	Johns Hopkins/University of Virginia
2001	Kotz, Bradley A.	Player	Syracuse University
2001	Allen, Helen	Player	New York Women's Lacrosse Association
2001	Borbee, Karen Emas	Player	University of Delaware
2001	DeTommaso, John	Player	Johns Hopkins University
2001	Duquette, Thomas B.	Player	University of Virginia
2001	Geiger, Kathleen	Player	Temple University
2001	Lubking, Susan W.	Player	Ursinus College
2001	Harkness, Ned	Coach	Rensselaer Polytechnic Institute
2001	Garvey, James	Official	Adelphi College
2001	Ware, Lanetta	Player/Coach	University of Richmond
2002	Chance, Nancy Vadner	Contributor	Boston Women's Lacrosse Association
2002	Hess, Eleanor Pete	Contributor	USWLA
2002	Colburn, Zachary T.	Player	University of Pennsylvania
2002	Dressel, Delverene A.	Player	Johns Hopkins University
2002	McGeeney, George W.	Player	University of Baltimore
2002	Dow, Heather C.	Player	University of Virginia
2002	Hoody, Sandra Kay	Player	University of Virginia
2002	Marino, Gerard Roddy	Player	University of Virginia
2002	Williams, Julie R.	Player/Coach	University of Virginia
2002	Tierney, William G.	Coach	Princeton University
2003	Miller, Jane	Player	Northeastern University
2003	Risch, Alison Hersey	Player	US National Team
2003	Cheek, John	Player	Washington College
2003	Kurtz, Aggie Bixler	Player	Smith College
2003	Werley, Merle "Mike" McCallister	Player	West Chester University
2003	Schnydman, Jerry	Player	Johns Hopkins University
2003	Scroggs, William	Coach	Johns Hopkins University
2003	Sheckells, Tom	Official	United States Military Academy
2003	Ulman, Bernard	Official	University of Maryland
2003	Wagner, Joan	Official	Millersville University
2004	Edell, Dick	Coach	Towson University
2004	Gioia, Rosalia	Contributor	Hunter College
2004	Kohn, Peter	Contributor	Middlebury College
2004	Stevenson, Ruth	Contributor	Temple University
2004	Hufnell, Jackie	Official	West Chester University
2004	Barbieri, Jane	Player	West Chester University
2004	Jordan, Barb	Player	Pennsylvania State University
2004	LoCascio, Sal	Player	University of Massachusetts
2004	Pietramala, David	Player	Johns Hopkins University
2004	Thearle, Michael	Player	University of Maryland
2005	Emmer, John "Jack"	Coach	Washington and Lee / USMA
2005	Rattray, Gillian D.	Coach	Pennsylvania State University
2005	Barnes, Mildred J.	Player	Boston Lacrosse Association
2005	Engelke, Norman	Player	Cornell University
2005	Gait, Gary	Player	Syracuse University
2005	Gait, Paul	Player	Syracuse University
2005	Haus, Thomas R.	Player	University of North Carolina
2005	Ganzenmuller, Susan L.	Official	Wells College
2005	Hayden, Dorothy Lee	Contributor	Baltimore Lacrosse Club
2005	O'Leary, Amanda Moore	Player/Coach	Temple University
2006	Harper, Jo Ann "Josie"	Coach	West Chester University
2006	Barnhill, Ethel "Feffie"	Contributor	Ursinus College
2006	Phillips, John D.	Contributor	Cornell University
2006	Cook, Jeffrey G.	Player	Johns Hopkins University
2006	Coughlin, Michael D.	Player	United States Naval Academy
2006	Gallagher, Danielle	Player	College of William & Mary
2006	Heath, Gloria W.	Player	Smith College
2006	Mackesey, Daniel R.	Player	Cornell University
2006	McCabe, Patrick J.	Player	Syracuse University
2006	Weatherall, Sandy Bryan	Player	Dartmouth College
2007	Pfluger, Sharon G.	Coach	The College of New Jersey
2007	Ford, Susan	Contributor	Connecticut College
2007	Cummings-Danson, Gail	Player	Temple University
2007	Dunn, Gertrude	Player	West Chester University
2007	Goldstein, Timothy	Player	Cornell University
2007	Kidder, Susan K.	Player	East Stroudsburg University
2007	Lowe, Darren	Player	Brown University
2007	Ripplemyer, Karl "Rip"	Player	United States Naval Academy
2007	Sears, Thomas	Player	University of North Carolina
2007	Wood, Brian	Player	Johns Hopkins University
2008	Brennan, Roberta	Player	Boston Women's Lacrosse Association
2008	Craun, Lynn	Official	James Madison University
2008	Dillon, Pat	Contributor	Towson University
2008	Marechek, Tom	Player	Syracuse University
2008	Sailer, Chris	Coach	Princeton University
2008	Starsia, Dom	Coach	Brown University
2008	Tracy, George	Player	United States Naval Academy
2008	Watts, Dick	Contributor	Johns Hopkins University
2009	Greer Brown, Cherie	Player	University of Virginia
2009	Long, Jeffrey J.	Player	United States Naval Academy
2009	Miller O’Donnell, Jennifer	Official	West Chester University
2009	Wilk Strosberg, Jessica	Player	University of Maryland
2009	Lowe, Kevin	Player	Princeton University
2009	Millon, Mark	Player	University of Massachusetts Amherst
2009	Curry, Todd	Player	Syracuse University
2009	Price Genovese, Patricia	Coach	No affiliation
2010	Bacigalupo, Scott	Player	Princeton University
2010	Burnett, Michael	Player	University of North Carolina
2010	Ford, Harry McNamara "Mac"	Player	University of North Carolina
2010	Gaffney, Eleanor Keady	Player	Boston Women's Lacrosse Association / U.S. National Team
2010	Hartog, Francesca Den	Player	Harvard University
2010	Rosen, Bonnie	Player	University of Virginia
2010	Stefano, Mary McCarthy	Player	Pennsylvania State University
2010	Kaley, Jack	Coach	No affiliation
2011	Allison, Bruce	Contributor	USILA President
2011	McKinny, Suzanne H.	Umpire	Ursinus College
2011	Davis, Traci	Player	Ursinus College
2011	Reese, Jon	Player	Yale University
2011	Lanahan Zvosec, Sandra	Player	University of Maryland
2011	Huntley, David W.	Player	Johns Hopkins University
2011	Lawlor, John Jake	Player	United States Naval Academy
2012	Foote, Missy	Coach	Middlebury College
2012	Amonte Hiller, Kelly	Player	University of Maryland
2012	Adams, Jen	Player	University of Maryland
2012	Dougherty, Brian	Player	University of Maryland
2012	Hubbard, Jesse	Player	Princeton University
2012	Colsey, Roy	Player	Syracuse University
2012	Nelson, Tim	Player	Syracuse University
2012	Timchal, Cindy	Coach	Northwestern / Maryland / Navy
2013	Miller, Bill	Player	Hobart College
2013	Watson, Michael	Player	University of Virginia
2013	Carney Burke, Quinn	Player	University of Maryland
2013	Berkman, Jim	Coach	Salisbury University
2013	Stumpf, Tracy	Player	University of Maryland
2013	Heether, Sue D.	Player	Loyola University Maryland
2013	Wade, Ryan	Player	University of North Carolina
2013	DeJuliis, Michele	Player	Pennsylvania State University
2014	Cockerton, Stan	Player	North Carolina State University
2014	Uhlfelder, Michele	Player	University of Maryland
2014	Mitchell, Steve	Player	Johns Hopkins University
2014	Watson, Margery	Contributor	Ursinus College
2014	Wakefield, Carole	Contributor	Lacrosse Magazine
2014	Millon, Erin Brown	Player	University of Maryland
2014	Jalbert, Jay	Player	University of Virginia
2014	Voelker, Peter G.	Player	University of North Carolina
2015	Voelker, Brian	Player	Johns Hopkins University
2015	Curran, Jake	Contributor	University of Florida
2015	Elicker, Julie Hull	Player	James Madison University
2015	Hartranft, Bob	Coach	State University of New York at Oswego
2015	Geppi-Aikens, Diane	Coach	Loyola University Maryland
2015	Vaughan, Maggie	Player	Harvard University
2015	Nelson, Sarah	Player	Harvard University
2015	Fin, Dom	Player	Syracuse University
2015	Lockwood, Charlie	Player	Syracuse University
2016	Anderson, Margie	Player	University of Massachusetts Amherst
2016	Mike Morrill	Player	Johns Hopkins University
2016	Miles, Glen	Player	United States Naval Academy
2016	Shek, Robert	Player	Towson University
2016	Doyle, Michele LeFevre	Player	West Chester University
2016	Tucker, John	Player	Johns Hopkins University
2016	Dayton, Julie	Player	Longwood University
2016	Connelly, Joanne	Player	Pennsylvania State University
2016	Basner, Kim	Official	West Chester University
2017	Knight, Doug	Player	University of Virginia
2017	Powell, Casey	Player	Syracuse University
2017	Zimmerman, Don	Coach	Johns Hopkins / UMBC
2017	Payette, Laurette	Contributor	USWLA
2017	McDonald, Jim	Contributor	Washington and Lee University
2017	Wood, Robyn Nye	Player	University of Virginia
2017	Sweet, Brooks	Player	University of Massachusetts Amherst
2017	Lane, Leslie Blankin	Player	Hollins University
2017	Redfern, Jill Johnson	Player	Ursinus College
2018	Morrow, David	Player	Princeton University
2018	Friedman, Leigh Buck	Player	Towson University
2018	Powell, Ryan	Player	Syracuse University
2018	Haugen, A.J.	Player	Johns Hopkins University
2018	Wescott, Denise	Contributor	University of Maryland
2018	Kahoe, Alex	Player	University of Maryland
2018	Kirby, Tami Worley	Player	Pennsylvania State University
2018	Cassese, Kevin	Player	Duke University
2018	Kilgour, Phyllis	Coach	Radnor High School
2019	Forbes, Sarah	Player	University of Maryland
2021	Jenny Levy	Coach	University of North Carolina
2021	Reece McCarthy	Player	Aiken High School
2021	Pirro, John J	Player	Roanoke College
2023	Lynn Bowers	Official	NCAA / CWLOA
2023	John Danowski	Coach	Duke University
2023	Katie Chrest Erbe	Player	Duke University
2023	Kyle Harrison	Player	Johns Hopkins University
2023	Laura Hebert	Contributor	NCAA / USA Lacrosse
2023	Bob Shaw	Player	Cornell University
2023	Kyle Sweeney	Player	Georgetown University
2024	Carol Cantele	Coach	Gettysburg College
2024	John Grant Jr.	Player	University of Delaware
2024	Vin LoBello	Official	NCAA / USILA
2024	Kristen Kjellman Marshall	Player	Northwestern University
2024	Brodie Merrill	Player	Georgetown University
2024	Patti Klecha-Porter	Official	NCAA
2024	Paul Rabil	Player	Johns Hopkins University
2024	Betsy Meng Ramsey	Coach	Ursinus College
2025	Ned Crotty	Player	Duke University
2025	Matt Danowski	Player	Duke University
2025	Leif Elsmo	Contributor	Bowling Green State University
2025	Maggie Faulkner	Coach	Towson University
2025	Tom Flatley	Coach	United States men's national lacrosse team
2025	Christie Jenkins Kemezis	Player	University of Maryland
2025	Crista Samaras	Player	Princeton University
2025	Kristin Sommar Jenney	Player	University of Maryland

== Schools/affiliations by number of inductees ==
School/affiliation	Number of inductees
Johns Hopkins University	68
University of Maryland	34
Syracuse University	21
Cornell University	18
Princeton University	17
United States Naval Academy	14
University of Virginia	14
West Chester University	12
Ursinus College	12
United States Military Academy	8
Duke University	8
St. John's College	8
State University of New York at Cortland	7
Towson University	7
Hobart College	6
Pennsylvania State University	6
Rutgers University	6
Swarthmore College	6
Yale University	6
Washington and Lee University	6

Only includes schools/affiliations with more than five inductees

== See also ==
- List of Canadian Lacrosse Hall of Fame members
- US Lacrosse chapter halls of fame
- US Intercollegiate Lacrosse Association All-American Team
- Tewaaraton Trophy
