= Roy Simmons Jr. =

American lacrosse coach (born 1935)

Biographical details
- Born: August 6, 1935 (age 91)

Playing career
- 1955–1958: Syracuse

Coaching career (HC unless noted)
- 1959–1970: Syracuse (freshmen)
- 1971–1998: Syracuse

Head coaching record
- Overall: 290–96

Accomplishments and honors

Championships
- 1983 NCAA Division I national championship; 1988 NCAA Division I national championship; 1989 NCAA Division I national championship; 1990 NCAA Division I national championship (later vacated); 1993 NCAA Division I national championship; 1995 NCAA Division I national championship

Awards
- As player: 1957 honorable mention All-American; 1958 honorable mention All-American; 1991 National Lacrosse Hall of Fame; As coach: 1980 F. Morris Touchstone Award

Roy D. Simmons Jr. (born August 6, 1935) is a former American lacrosse coach who was the head coach of the Syracuse Orange men's lacrosse team from 1971 to 1998. Simmons' teams won the National Collegiate Athletic Association (NCAA) Men's Lacrosse Championship six times (one was later vacated), and appeared in the national semifinals 16 consecutive seasons. He won the F. Morris Touchstone Award for the coach of the year in NCAA men's lacrosse in 1980, and was inducted into the National Lacrosse Hall of Fame in 1991.

== Early life and playing career ==
Simmons's father, Roy Simmons Sr., was the coach of Syracuse's men's lacrosse team for 39 seasons; he was a 1964 National Lacrosse Hall of Fame inductee. According to Simmons Jr., during his early years he was a mascot for his father's teams, and was a regular in the team's locker room. He was also interested in boxing, and Simmons Sr. referred to him as "Slugger". Simmons Jr. attended Kimball Union Academy, playing on the school's lacrosse team for three seasons. Beginning in 1955, Simmons Jr. went to Syracuse University, playing on the lacrosse team coached by his father. In 1957, the Orange posted an undefeated record; Simmons Jr. trailed only Jim Brown among the team's top scorers, and was named an honorable mention All-American. The Orange finished second in the end-of-season national rankings, behind Johns Hopkins. He repeated as an honorable mention All-American selection the next season, when he served as captain for Syracuse.

== Coaching career ==
In 1958, Simmons graduated from Syracuse with a Bachelor of Fine Arts in sculpture, and the following year he joined his father's staff as coach of the freshman lacrosse team. Twelve years later, he succeeded his father as head coach of the varsity team. Early in his head coaching career, the program faced budget limitations and was unsuccessful, with losing records in three straight seasons. In 1974, it had a 2–9 win–loss record, and Simmons once fielded two goaltenders during a game against Cornell. Eventually, he received increased support in the form of scholarships and focused his recruiting efforts on central New York-based high school players. In addition, Simmons had numerous players from the Iroquois tribe. Previously, he had relied on local Native Americans and ex-members of the Syracuse Orange football team to form the basis of his rosters. Syracuse reached the NCAA Tournament for the first time in 1979. In 1980, the Orange reached the semifinals of the NCAA Tournament before losing to Johns Hopkins, their furthest advancement in the event to that point under the leadership of Simmons. Simmons was named the coach of the year in Division I men's lacrosse, claiming the F. Morris Touchstone Award.

Syracuse earned another NCAA Tournament bid in 1981, but was not selected the following season; this was the last time until 2005 that the Orange did not reach the national semifinals. In 1983, Syracuse posted an 11–1 record in the regular season—losing only to Army—then defeated Pennsylvania and Maryland in the NCAA Tournament to reach the championship game against top-ranked Johns Hopkins. After entering halftime with a four-goal deficit to Johns Hopkins, Simmons Jr. forbid his players from entering the team's locker room, telling them "There is no sanctuary." The Orange trailed 12–5 at one point in the second half, but rallied for a 17–16 victory, claiming the program's first NCAA Tournament title and first national championship since 1925.

Entering the 1984 NCAA Tournament, the Orange were unbeaten. They reached the final but lost in a rematch against Johns Hopkins, 13–10. After Syracuse finished the 1985 regular season with a 12–1 record, the teams met in the NCAA Tournament final; Syracuse was again defeated by Johns Hopkins, 11–4. The Orange were eliminated in the semifinals of the NCAA Tournament the next two seasons, against Virginia and Cornell, respectively. However, 1987 marked the Syracuse debuts of brothers Gary and Paul Gait. The Gaits, who had resided in Canada, were recruited by Simmons at a time when Canadian lacrosse players typically took part in indoor games. Before the Gaits started playing for Syracuse, Simmons called them "the two greatest lacrosse players I've ever seen in my life"; the pair combined for 118 goals in 1988. In 1988, Simmons led Syracuse to the NCAA Tournament title for a second time. The Orange, playing in Syracuse, defeated Cornell 13–8 in the championship game to finish the season with a perfect 15–0 record. Simmons later recruited Tom Marechek, the university's second-leading goal scorer behind Gary Gait. He received a recommendation about Marechek from the Gaits, and offered him a scholarship without watching any of his games. In 1989, Simmons's team lost to Johns Hopkins in their first game, which was their only defeat of the season. The Orange repeated as NCAA champions, winning the NCAA Tournament final 13–12 over Johns Hopkins.

Syracuse returned to the championship game of the NCAA Tournament in 1990, defeating Loyola 21–9 to give Simmons an apparent fourth title, and third in a row. However, in 1995 the NCAA stripped Syracuse of the championship after a report that an automobile loan for Paul Gait was co-signed by Simmons's wife, Nancy. North Carolina prevented Syracuse from playing in the championship game of the 1991 NCAA Tournament with a 19–13 victory in the semifinals. The Orange reached the national championship game for the seventh time in ten seasons in 1992, but were defeated by Princeton, 10–9 in double overtime. Simmons's team made another national championship game appearance the next season, this time winning 13–12 over North Carolina. By 1995, Simmons was thinking of stepping down from the Orange lacrosse program, following personal and family health issues. His team reached the Final Four of the NCAA Tournament for the 13th consecutive season, and faced Maryland for the title. With a 13–9 Syracuse victory, Simmons claimed his sixth national championship, counting the vacated 1990 title.

Simmons remained the head coach of the Syracuse lacrosse team through 1998, and his 1996–98 teams each won 11 games before being eliminated in the national semifinals. He announced his retirement following an 11–10 defeat against Princeton in the 1998 Final Four. He later indicated that a desire to pursue an art hobby and have more family time was the reason for his decision. He was 290–96 in his head coaching career, and had a streak of reaching the semifinals of the NCAA Tournament in 16 consecutive seasons prior to his retirement.

== Honors ==
The National Lacrosse Hall of Fame inducted Simmons in 1991 for his playing career. One year earlier, he had been selected to be a member of the Greater Syracuse Sports Hall of Fame.

== Family ==
Simmons and his late wife, Nancy, a physical education teacher, had three children. One of his children, Roy III, is the director of operations for Syracuse's men's lacrosse team, and played on Simmons's 1978–1981 teams. His grandson, Ryan Simmons, also played lacrosse for the Orange.

== Head coaching record ==
Record table
Season	Team	Overall	Conference	Standing	Postseason
Syracuse Orangemen (NCAA independent) (1971–1998)
1971	Syracuse	9–4			
1972	Syracuse	8–8			
1973	Syracuse	4–6			
1974	Syracuse	2–9			
1975	Syracuse	3–8			
1976	Syracuse	7–4			
1977	Syracuse	8–6			
1978	Syracuse	10–3			
1979	Syracuse	10–5			NCAA Division I quarterfinals
1980	Syracuse	12–2			NCAA Division I semifinals
1981	Syracuse	7–4			NCAA Division I quarterfinals
1982	Syracuse	6–4			
1983	Syracuse	14–1			NCAA Division I champion
1984	Syracuse	15–1			NCAA Division I runner-up
1985	Syracuse	14–2			NCAA Division I runner-up
1986	Syracuse	14–3			NCAA Division I semifinals
1987	Syracuse	9–4			NCAA Division I semifinals
1988	Syracuse	15–0			NCAA Division I champion
1989	Syracuse	14–1			NCAA Division I champion
1990	Syracuse	13–0			NCAA Division I champion (vacated)
1991	Syracuse	12–3			NCAA Division I semifinals
1992	Syracuse	13–2			NCAA Division I runner-up
1993	Syracuse	12–2			NCAA Division I champion
1994	Syracuse	13–2			NCAA Division I semifinals
1995	Syracuse	13–2			NCAA Division I champion
1996	Syracuse	11–4			NCAA Division I semifinals
1997	Syracuse	11–3			NCAA Division I semifinals
1998	Syracuse	11–3			NCAA Division I semifinals
Total:		290–96 (.751)			
National champion Postseason invitational champion Conference regular season champion Conference regular season and conference tournament champion Division regular season champion Division regular season and conference tournament champion Conference tournament champion

== See also ==
- List of college men's lacrosse coaches with 250 wins
- List of National Lacrosse Hall of Fame members

== Bibliography ==
- Case, Dick (2009). Remembering Syracuse. The History Press. ISBN 9781596295834.
- Galpin, William Freeman; Greene, John Robert; Wilson, Richard; Barck, Oscar Theodore (1998). Syracuse University: The Corbally and Eggers Years, 1969–1991. Syracuse University Press. ISBN 9780815605492.
- Maiorana, Sal; Pitoniak, Scott (2005). Slices of Orange: Great Games & Performers in Syracuse University Sports History. Syracuse University Press. ISBN 9780815608448.
