= 1995 NCAA Division I men's lacrosse tournament =

- Teams: 12
- Finals site: Byrd Stadium, College Park, Maryland
- Champions: Syracuse (5th title)
- Runner-up: Maryland (7th title game)
- Semifinalists: Johns Hopkins (19th Final Four); Virginia (11th Final Four)
- Winning coach: Roy Simmons Jr. (5th title)
- MOP: Brian Dougherty, Maryland
- Attendance: 26,229 finals 71,978 total
- Top scorer: Rob Kavovit, Syracuse (18 goals)

The 1995 NCAA Division I lacrosse tournament was the 25th annual tournament hosted by the National Collegiate Athletic Association to determine the team champion of men's college lacrosse among its Division I programs, held at the end of the 1995 NCAA Division I men's lacrosse season.

Syracuse defeated Maryland in the final, 13–9.

The championship game was played at Byrd Stadium at the University of Maryland in College Park, Maryland, with 26,229 fans in attendance.

== Summary ==
Despite the loss, Maryland goalie Brian Dougherty was named the tournament's Most Outstanding Player. Dougherty was outstanding in the semi-finals, showing why he earned the award as Division I goalie of the year, making 23 saves on 59 shots. In the first quarter, Hopkins' attack took 19 shots with Dougherty making 12 saves, allowing Maryland to take a 4-1 first-quarter lead.

In the finals, Maryland led 4–2 with a minute left in the first half before the Orange exploded to three straight goals to claim a 5-4 half time lead and that momentum led to the victory. Dougherty again had 23 saves in the finals.

Despite being on the losing side, Maryland goalie Brian Dougherty was named most outstanding player, making 59 total saves in the tournament. Also honored on the All-Tournament team were Syracuse's Mark Fietta, Nick Licameli, Rob Kavovit, Ric Beardsley and Casey Powell, as well as Dan Radebaugh, Matt Hahn, Peter Hilgartner and Rob Chomo for the Terrapins.

== Qualifying ==
Twelve NCAA Division I college men's lacrosse teams met after having played their way through a regular season, and for some, a conference tournament. No teams made their debut appearance in the Division I lacrosse tournament in 1995.

== Bracket ==
First Round
8	Loyola Maryland	17
North Carolina	11
Notre Dame	12
5	Duke	10
6	Princeton	11
Massachusetts	6
7	Brown	17
Cornell	9

Quarterfinals
1	Johns Hopkins	18
8	Loyola Maryland	5
4	Maryland	14
Notre Dame	11
6	Princeton	11
3	Syracuse	15
2	Virginia	16
7	Brown	13

Semifinals
1	Johns Hopkins	8
4	Maryland	16
3	Syracuse	20
2	Virginia	13

Final; May 29, 1995
4	Maryland	9
3	Syracuse	13

* = Overtime

== Box scores ==
=== Finals ===
==== #3 Syracuse vs. #4 Maryland ====
Team	1	2	3	4	Total
Syracuse	2	3	3	5	13
Maryland	1	3	2	3	9
Syracuse scoring – Rob Kavovit 4, Mark Fietta 2, Nick Licameli 2, Paul Carcaterra, Paul Sullivan, Casey Powell, Jim Morrisey, Doug Jackson; Maryland scoring – Matt Hahn 4, Greg Nelin 2, Rob Chomo, Charles Bullen, Peter Hilgartner; Shots: Syracuse 56, Maryland 38; Saves: Maryland Brian Dougherty 23, Syracuse Alex Rosier 17; Attendance: 26,229

=== Semifinals ===
==== #1 Johns Hopkins vs. #4 Maryland ====
Team	1	2	3	4	Total
Maryland	4	6	4	2	16
Johns Hopkins	1	3	2	2	8
Maryland scoring – Peter Hilgartner 3, Matt Hahn 3, Todd Evans 3, Rob Chomo 2, Greg Nelin, Chris Farmer, Mike Bordi, Kip Fulks, Andrew Whipple; Johns Hopkins scoring – Michael Noonan 2, Terry Riordan 2, Billy Evans, Kevin Kaiser, Milford Marchant, Casey Gordon; Shots: Johns Hopkins 59, Maryland 47; Saves: Maryland Brian Dougherty 23, Johns Hopkins Jonathan Marcus 12; Attendance: 30,392

==== #2 Virginia vs. #3 Syracuse ====
Team	1	2	3	4	Total
Syracuse	4	4	5	7	20
Virginia	3	3	4	3	13
Syracuse scoring – Nick Licameli 4, Mark Fietta 3, Casey Powell 3, Rob Kavovit 3, Roy Colsey 2, Mike Witek, Kristian Photopoulos, Jim Morrissey, Paul Sullivan, Doug Jackson; Virginia scoring – Michael Watson 3, Greg Traynor 2, David Jones 2, Harmar Thompson, Chris Ginter, Doug Knight, Ben Johnson, Tony Nugent, Tim Whiteley; Shots: Syracuse 48, Virginia 45; Saves: Syracuse Alex Rosier 17, Virginia Court Durling 16; Attendance: 30,392

=== Quarterfinals ===
==== #1 Johns Hopkins vs. #8 Loyola Maryland ====
Team	1	2	3	4	Total
Johns Hopkins	2	6	5	5	18
Loyola Maryland	3	0	1	1	5
Johns Hopkins scoring – Terry Riordan 6, Milford Marchant 3, Dave Marr 2, Brian Piccola, Chris Steer, Casey Gordon, Todd Kearney, Chris Macon, Werner Krueger, Billy Evans; Loyola Maryland scoring – Brian Bacso, Del Halladay, Chris Georgalas, Brian Duffy, Zach Thornton; Shots: Johns Hopkins 56, Loyola Maryland 35; Saves: Loyola Maryland Tim McGeeney 19, Brendan Fry 2 - Johns Hopkins Jonathan Marcus 13; Attendance: 4,966

==== #4 Maryland vs. Notre Dame ====
Team	1	2	3	4	Total
Maryland	4	4	2	4	14
Notre Dame	0	1	4	6	11
Maryland scoring – Pat McGuire 2, Peter Hilgartner 2, Kip Fulks 2, Matt Hahn 2, Rob Chomo, Jon Brothers, Andrew Whipple, Charles Bullen, Mike Bordi, Bill Ruhl: Notre Dame scoring – Randy Colley 3, Brian Erickson 2, Tim Kearney 2, Willie Sutton, Todd Bialous, Jim Keenan, Burke Hays; Shots: Maryland 44, Notre Dame 40; Saves: Notre Dame Alex Cade 15 - Maryland Brian Dougherty 13; Attendance: 3,002

==== #3 Syracuse vs. #6 Princeton ====
Team	1	2	3	4	Total
Syracuse	6	0	5	4	15
Princeton	1	4	3	3	11
Syracuse scoring – Casey Powell 4, Ric Beardsley 2, Roy Colsey 2, Mike Witek 2, Jim Morrissey, Rob Kavovit, Chad Smith, Paul Sullivan, Doug Jackson; Princeton scoring – Chris Massey 4, Bart Bansbach, Jesse Hubbard, Don McDonough, Jeff MacBean, Scott; Conklin, John Hess, Ben Strutt: Shots: Syracuse 59, Princeton 37; Saves: Syracuse Alex Rosier 19, Kevin Johnson 2 - Princeton Pat Cairns 18; Attendance: 5,116

==== #2 Virginia vs. #7 Brown ====
Team	1	2	3	4	Total
Virginia	7	2	3	4	16
Brown	4	5	1	3	13
Virginia scoring – Doug Knight 6, David Jones 3, Brad Hoag, Tim Whiteley, Michael Watson, Tony Nugent, Harmar Thompson, Sean Miller, Greg Traynor: Brown scoring – Robin Prince 5, James Gaensbauer 3, David Evans 2, Alex Goodman, Thomas Collard, Gregory; Rozycki: Shots: Brown 56, Virginia 54; Saves: Brown Greg Cattrano 17, Virginia Court Durling 12 - Joe Wilson 2; Attendance: 2,314

== All-Tournament Team ==
- Brian Dougherty, Maryland (Named the tournament's Most Outstanding Player)
- Mark Fietta, Syracuse
- Nick Licameli, Syracuse
- Rob Kavovit, Syracuse
- Ric Beardsley, Syracuse
- Casey Powell, Syracuse
- Dan Radebaugh, Maryland
- Matt Hahn, Maryland
- Peter Hilgartner, Maryland
- Rob Chomo, Maryland

== 25th anniversary all-time team ==
For the 25th Division I tournament, a 25th anniversary All-time team was selected. This team was nominated and selected based on the voting of all current and past Division I head coaches and all current and past members of the NCAA Men's Lacrosse Committee. The members of the team, followed by their last year of competition included: Scott Bacigalupo Princeton 1994, Tom Cafaro Army 1971, John DeTomasso Johns Hopkins 1986, Del Dressel Johns Hopkins 1986, Mike Federico Johns Hopkins 1980, Mike French Cornell 1976, Gary Gait Syracuse 1990, Paul Gait Syracuse 1990, Mark Greenberg Johns Hopkins 1980, Tom Haus North Carolina 1980, Chris Kane Cornell 1979, Brad Kotz Syracuse 1985, Richard Kowalchuk Johns Hopkins 1974, Dan MacKesey Cornell 1977, Eamon McEneaney Cornell 1977, David Morrow Princeton 1993, Tim Nelson Syracuse 1985, Mike O’Neill Johns Hopkins 1978, Dave Pietramala Johns Hopkins 1989, Larry Quinn Johns Hopkins 1985, Jonathan Reese Yale 1990, Brendan Schneck Johns Hopkins 1981, Tom Sears North Carolina 1983, Jack Thomas Johns Hopkins 1974, Frank Urso Maryland 1976.

== See also ==
- 1995 NCAA Division I women's lacrosse tournament
- 1995 NCAA Division II lacrosse tournament
- 1995 NCAA Division III men's lacrosse tournament
