= NCAA Division I men's lacrosse tournament =

Annual american lacrosse tournament

- Association: NCAA
- Sport: College field lacrosse
- Founded: 1971; 55 years ago
- Division: Division I
- No. of teams: 18
- Country: United States
- Most recent champion: Princeton (7th title)
- Most titles: Syracuse (10)
- Broadcaster: ESPN
- Website: NCAA.com
- 2026 Championship

The NCAA Division I men's lacrosse tournament is an annual tournament organized by the NCAA to determine the national champion of men's collegiate field lacrosse among its Division I members in the United States. It has been held every year since 1971, except 2020.

From 1936 through 1970, the United States Intercollegiate Lacrosse Association (USILA) awarded the Wingate Memorial Trophy annually to the collegiate champion based on regular season records.

Syracuse has been the most successful program since 1970 with 10 national titles, followed by Johns Hopkins with 9 national titles in the NCAA era.

Princeton is the reigning national champion, winning the school's seventh title in 2026 after 25 years after their last championship.

== History ==
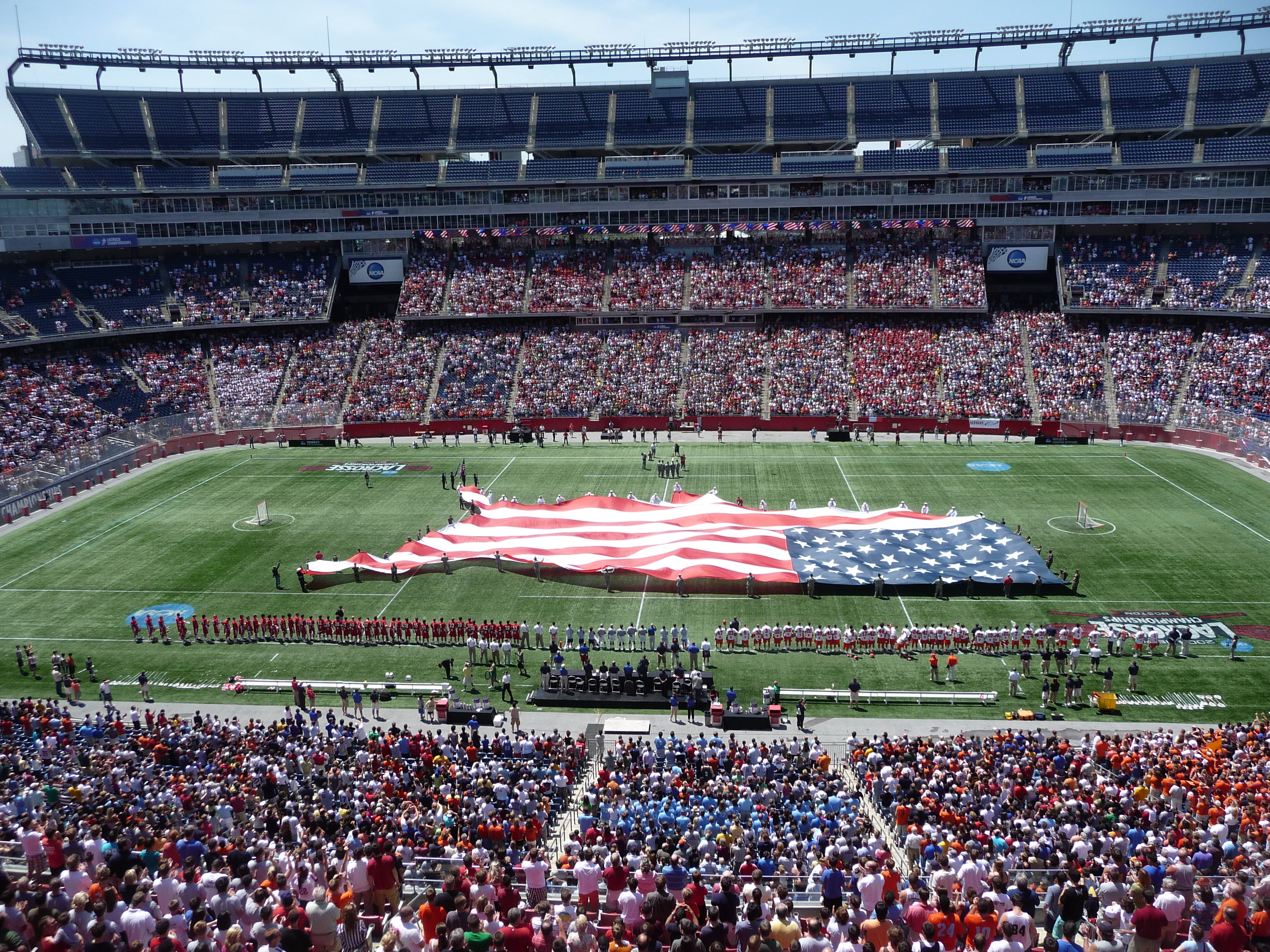
NCAA Championship 2009. Syracuse vs. Cornell pregame in Gillette Stadium. Syracuse would win 10-9 in OT.

The first Division I Championship tournament held in 1971 replaced the USILA and Wingate Memorial Trophy national title awards. As of 2023, 52 NCAA tournaments have been played (not held in 2020). In that span, 12 teams — Johns Hopkins, Syracuse, Princeton, North Carolina, Virginia, Cornell, Duke, Maryland, Loyola University (Maryland), Denver, Yale and Notre Dame — have won the national title with Syracuse leading with ten titles (plus one vacated by the NCAA (Note: Syracuse's championship in the 1990 tournament was vacated by the NCAA. The NCAA Committee on Infractions determined that Paul Gait had played in the 1990 championship while ineligible. Under NCAA rules, Syracuse and Paul Gait's records for that championship were vacated. The NCAA does not recognize Syracuse and coach Roy Simmons, Jr.'s record in the 1990 tournament.)). In all, 41 teams have participated in the NCAA tournament since its inception. Only seven unseeded teams — the 1988 Cornell Big Red, the 1991 Towson Tigers, the 2006 Massachusetts Minutemen, the 2010 Notre Dame Fighting Irish, the 2011 and 2012 Maryland Terrapins and the 2016 North Carolina Tar Heels — have made it to the championship game, and only ten unseeded teams have made it to the tournament semi-finals, the most recent being North Carolina in 2016. Johns Hopkins has appeared in every tournament but three (1971, 2013, 2021). The Number One seed in the tournament has won the title 22 times and there have been 13 undefeated National Champions. North Carolina in 2016 was the first unseeded team to win the national title.

Originally consisting of eight teams, the size of the tournament field has changed over the years, increasing to 10 in 1986, 12 in 1987, 16 in 2003, 18 in 2014, and down to 17 in 2017. Since 2021, the size has varied almost annually: 16 in 2021, 17 in 2023 and 2024, and 18 in 2022 and 2025. The two semifinal games and the final have been played on the same weekend at the same stadium since 1986. All three matches have always been scheduled for Memorial Day weekend, with the semifinals doubleheader on Saturday afternoon and the final held on the holiday itself.

The sport has historically been focused in the Northeast and Mid-Atlantic states, with the sport's U.S. heartland today extending from New England to North Carolina. Only eight schools from outside the Northeast/Mid-Atlantic have played in the NCAA tournament—Air Force, Butler, Denver, Marquette, Notre Dame, Ohio State, Michigan and Utah. No team west of the Eastern Time Zone won an NCAA championship until Denver in 2015.

21 coaches have won Division I titles: Richie Moran, Glenn Thiel, Bud Beardmore, Bob Scott, Henry Ciccarone, Willie Scroggs, Jr., Roy Simmons, Jr., Dave Klarmann, Don Zimmerman, Bill Tierney, Dom Starsia, John Desko, Dave Pietramala, John Danowski, Charley Toomey, John Tillman, Joe Breschi, Andy Shay, Lars Tiffany, Kevin Corrigan and Connor Buczek. Tierney is the only one to have won at two different schools (Princeton and Denver).

== Results ==
NCAA Division I men's lacrosse tournament
Year	Host city (University)	Host Stadium	Final		
Year	Host city (University)	Host Stadium	Winner (Record) (Seed)	Score	Runner-up (Record) (Seed)
1971; Details	Hempstead, New York (Hofstra)	Hofstra Stadium	Cornell (13–1) (#1)	12–6	Maryland (9–4) (#3)
1972; Details	College Park, Maryland (Maryland)	Byrd Stadium	Virginia (11–4) (n/a)	13–12	Johns Hopkins (11–2) (n/a)
1973; Details	Philadelphia (Penn)	Franklin Field	Maryland (10–0) (#1)	10–9 (OT)	Johns Hopkins (11–2) (#2)
1974; Details	Piscataway, New Jersey (Rutgers)	Rutgers Stadium I	Johns Hopkins (12–2) (#2)	17–12	Maryland (8–2) (#1)
1975; Details	Baltimore (Johns Hopkins)	Homewood Field	Maryland (8–2) (#3)	20–13	Navy (10–5) (#4)
1976; Details	Providence, Rhode Island (Brown)	Brown Stadium	Cornell (16–0) (#2)	16–13 (OT)	Maryland (10–1) (#1)
1977; Details	Charlottesville, Virginia (Virginia)	Scott Stadium	Cornell (13–0) (#1)	16–8	Johns Hopkins (11–2) (#2)
1978; Details	Piscataway, New Jersey (Rutgers)	Rutgers Stadium I	Johns Hopkins (13–1) (#2)	13–8	Cornell (13–1) (#1)
1979; Details	College Park, Maryland (Maryland)	Byrd Stadium	Johns Hopkins (13–0) (#1)	15–9	Maryland (9–2) (#2)
1980; Details	Ithaca, New York (Cornell)	Schoellkopf Field	Johns Hopkins (14–1) (#2)	9–8 (2OT)	Virginia (12–2) (#1)
1981; Details	Princeton, New Jersey (Princeton)	Palmer Stadium	North Carolina (12–0) (#2)	14–13	Johns Hopkins (13–1) (#1)
1982; Details	Charlottesville, Virginia (Virginia)	Scott Stadium	North Carolina (14–0) (#1)	7–5	Johns Hopkins (11–3) (#2)
1983; Details	Piscataway, New Jersey (Rutgers)	Rutgers Stadium I	Syracuse (14–1) (#2)	17–16	Johns Hopkins (12–2) (#1)
1984; Details	Newark, Delaware (Delaware)	Delaware Stadium	Johns Hopkins (14–0) (#1)	13–10	Syracuse (15–1) (#2)
1985; Details	Providence, Rhode Island (Brown)	Brown Stadium	Johns Hopkins (13–1) (#1)	11–4	Syracuse (14–2) (#2)
1986; Details	Newark, Delaware (Delaware)	Delaware Stadium	North Carolina (11–3) (#5)	10–9 (OT)	Virginia (12–3) (#3)
1987; Details	Piscataway, New Jersey (Rutgers)	Rutgers Stadium I	Johns Hopkins (10–3) (#4)	11–10	Cornell (13–1) (#2)
1988; Details	Syracuse, New York (Syracuse)	Carrier Dome	Syracuse (15–0) (#1)	13–8	Cornell (9–6) (unseeded)
1989; Details	College Park, Maryland (Maryland)	Byrd Stadium	Syracuse (14–1) (#1)	13–12	Johns Hopkins (11–2) (#2)
1990; Details	Piscataway, New Jersey (Rutgers)	Rutgers Stadium I	Syracuse (Vacated) (13–0) (#1)	21–9	Loyola (11–3) (#3)
1991; Details	Syracuse, New York (Syracuse)	Carrier Dome	North Carolina (16–0) (#1)	18–13	Towson (12–4) (unseeded)
1992; Details	Philadelphia (Penn)	Franklin Field	Princeton (13–2) (#3)	10–9 (OT)	Syracuse (13–2) (#1)
1993; Details	College Park, Maryland (Maryland)	Byrd Stadium	Syracuse (12–2) (#3)	13–12	North Carolina (14–2) (#1)
1994; Details	College Park, Maryland (Maryland)	Byrd Stadium	Princeton (14–1) (#3)	9–8 (OT)	Virginia (13–4) (#5)
1995; Details	College Park, Maryland (Maryland)	Byrd Stadium	Syracuse (13–2) (#3)	13–9	Maryland (12–4) (#4)
1996; Details	College Park, Maryland (Maryland)	Byrd Stadium	Princeton (14–1) (#1)	13–12 (OT)	Virginia (12–4) (#3)
1997; Details	College Park, Maryland (Maryland)	Byrd Stadium	Princeton (15–0) (#1)	19–7	Maryland (11–5) (#7)
1998; Details	Piscataway, New Jersey (Rutgers)	Rutgers Stadium II	Princeton (14–1) (#2)	15–5	Maryland (14–3) (#5)
1999; Details	College Park, Maryland (Maryland)	Byrd Stadium	Virginia (13–3) (#3)	12–10	Syracuse (12–5) (#8)
2000; Details	College Park, Maryland (Maryland)	Byrd Stadium	Syracuse (15–1) (#1)	13–7	Princeton (12–3) (#3)
2001; Details	Piscataway, New Jersey (Rutgers)	Rutgers Stadium II	Princeton (14–1) (#2)	10–9 (OT)	Syracuse (13–3) (#1)
2002; Details	Piscataway, New Jersey (Rutgers)	Rutgers Stadium II	Syracuse (15–2) (#2)	13–12	Princeton (10–5) (#4)
2003; Details	Baltimore	M&T Bank Stadium	Virginia (15–2) (#2)	9–7	Johns Hopkins (14–2) (#1)
2004; Details	Baltimore	M&T Bank Stadium	Syracuse (15–2) (#4)	14–13	Navy (15–3) (#2)
2005; Details	Philadelphia (Penn)	Lincoln Financial Field	Johns Hopkins (16–0) (#1)	9–8	Duke (17–3) (#2)
2006; Details	Philadelphia (Penn)	Lincoln Financial Field	Virginia (17–0) (#1)	15–7	Massachusetts (13–5) (unseeded)
2007; Details	Baltimore	M&T Bank Stadium	Johns Hopkins (13–4) (#3)	12–11	Duke (17–3) (#1)
2008; Details	Foxborough, Massachusetts	Gillette Stadium	Syracuse (16–2) (#3)	13–10	Johns Hopkins (11–6) (#5)
2009; Details	Foxborough, Massachusetts	Gillette Stadium	Syracuse (15–2) (#2)	10–9 (OT)	Cornell (13–4) (#5)
2010; Details	Baltimore	M&T Bank Stadium	Duke (16–4) (#5)	6–5 (OT)	Notre Dame (12–6) (unseeded)
2011; Details	Baltimore	M&T Bank Stadium	Virginia (13–5) (#7)	9–7	Maryland (13–5) (unseeded)
2012; Details	Foxborough, Massachusetts	Gillette Stadium	Loyola (18–1) (#1)	9–3	Maryland (12–6) (unseeded)
2013; Details	Philadelphia (Drexel)	Lincoln Financial Field	Duke (16–5) (#7)	16–10	Syracuse (16–4) (#1)
2014; Details	Baltimore	M&T Bank Stadium	Duke (17–3) (#1)	11–9	Notre Dame (12–6) (#6)
2015; Details	Philadelphia (Drexel)	Lincoln Financial Field	Denver (17–2) (#4)	10–5	Maryland (15–4) (#6)
2016; Details	Philadelphia (Drexel)	Lincoln Financial Field	North Carolina (12–6) (unseeded)	14–13 (OT)	Maryland (17–3) (#1)
2017; Details	Foxborough, Massachusetts	Gillette Stadium	Maryland (16–3) (#1)	9–6	Ohio State (16–5) (#3)
2018; Details	Foxborough, Massachusetts	Gillette Stadium	Yale (17–3) (#3)	13–11	Duke (16–4) (#4)
2019; Details	Philadelphia (Drexel)	Lincoln Financial Field	Virginia (17–3) (#3)	13–9	Yale (15–4) (#5)
2020; Details	Philadelphia (Drexel)	Lincoln Financial Field	Cancelled due to the coronavirus pandemic		
2021; Details	East Hartford, Connecticut (Fairfield)	Rentschler Field	Virginia (14–4) (#4)	17–16	Maryland (15–1) (#3)
2022; Details	East Hartford, Connecticut (Fairfield)	Rentschler Field	Maryland (18–0) (#1)	9–7	Cornell (14–5) (#7)
2023; Details	Philadelphia (Drexel)	Lincoln Financial Field	Notre Dame (13–2) (#3)	13–9	Duke (16–2) (#1)
2024; Details	Philadelphia (Drexel)	Lincoln Financial Field	Notre Dame (15–1) (#1)	15–5	Maryland (11–5) (#7)
2025; Details	Foxborough, Massachusetts	Gillette Stadium	Cornell (18–1) (#1)	13–10	Maryland (14–4) (#2)
2026; Details	Charlottesville, Virginia (Virginia)	Scott Stadium	Princeton (17–2) (#1)	16–9	Notre Dame (13–3) (#2)

== NCAA team titles ==
Below is a list of championships awarded by the NCAA while vacated titles are not included in a schools championship total.

National Championships By School
10 championships, 9 championships, 7 championships, 6 championships, 5 championships, 4 championships, 3 championships, 2 championships, 1 championship

Team	Titles	Years won
Syracuse	10	1983, 1988, 1989, 1990, 1993, 1995, 2000, 2002, 2004, 2008, 2009
Johns Hopkins	9	1974, 1978, 1979, 1980, 1984, 1985, 1987, 2005, 2007
Princeton	7	1992, 1994, 1996, 1997, 1998, 2001, 2026
Virginia	7	1972, 1999, 2003, 2006, 2011, 2019, 2021
North Carolina	5	1981, 1982, 1986, 1991, 2016
Cornell	4	1971, 1976, 1977, 2025
Maryland	4	1973, 1975, 2017, 2022
Duke	3	2010, 2013, 2014
Notre Dame	2	2023, 2024
Loyola	1	2012
Denver	1	2015
Yale	1	2018

=== Results by School and Year ===
Key

- CH National Champion
- RU National Runner-up
- SF Semifinals
- QF Quarterfinals
- 10 12 16 First Round (10 teams in 1986, 12 teams starting in 1987, 16 teams starting in 2003)
- • Play-In Round (1 or 2 teams per year, starting in 2014.); Opening Round (4 teams, starting in 2025)
- ~~CH~~ Syracuse national championship vacated in 1990.

Each tournament has seeded the top 8 seeds. The top seed is shown with double underline, the teams seeded between No. 2 and No. 4 are shown with single underline, and the teams seeded between No. 5 and No. 8 are shown with dotted underline.

School	Conference	#	QF	SF	CG	CH	71	72	73	74	75	76	77	78	79	80	81	82	83	84	85	86	87	88	89	90	91	92	93	94	95	96	97	98	99	00	01	02	03	04	05	06	07	08	09	10	11	12	13	14	15	16	17	18	19	21	22	23	24	25	26
Syracuse	ACC	42	35	28	16	10									QF	SF	QF		CH	RU	RU	SF	SF	CH	CH	~~CH~~	SF	RU	CH	SF	CH	SF	SF	SF	RU	CH	RU	CH	SF	CH	16	SF		CH	CH	16	QF	16	RU	16	QF	QF	QF	16	16	16			QF	SF	SF
Johns Hopkins	Big Ten	50	45	29	18	9		RU	RU	CH	QF	SF	RU	CH	CH	CH	RU	RU	RU	CH	CH	SF	CH	QF	RU	12	QF	SF	SF	QF	SF	SF	QF	QF	SF	SF	QF	SF	RU	SF	CH	QF	CH	RU	QF	16	QF	QF		QF	SF	16	16	QF	16			QF	QF		QF
Virginia	ACC	44	36	26	11	7	QF	CH	SF	QF				QF	SF	RU	SF	SF	QF	QF	SF	RU		SF		12	12		QF	RU	SF	RU	QF	QF	CH	SF	12	SF	CH		SF	CH	16	SF	SF	SF	CH	QF		16	16			16	CH	CH	QF	SF	SF		16
Princeton	Ivy League	25	19	12	9	7																				QF	QF	CH	SF	CH	QF	CH	CH	CH	12	RU	CH	RU	QF	SF		QF	16		QF	16		16									SF	16	16	QF	CH
North Carolina	ACC	35	27	14	6	5						QF	QF			SF	CH	CH	SF	SF	SF	CH	QF	QF	SF	SF	CH	SF	RU	QF	12	QF		12						QF			QF	16	QF	QF	16	16	QF	16	QF	CH	16			SF				16	QF
Maryland	Big Ten	47	42	30	18	4	RU	SF	CH	RU	CH	RU	SF	SF	RU		QF	QF	SF			QF	SF		SF		SF	QF	12	12	RU	QF	RU	RU		QF	QF		SF	QF	SF	SF	16	QF	QF	QF	RU	RU	16	SF	RU	RU	CH	SF	QF	RU	CH	16	RU	RU	
Cornell	Ivy League	32	23	15	9	4	CH			SF	SF	CH	CH	RU	QF	QF		SF	QF				RU	RU	12						12					12		QF		QF	QF	16	SF	16	RU	SF	QF		SF	16	16			QF			RU	16		CH	16
Duke	ACC	28	22	15	7	3																						12		QF	12		SF	QF	QF	QF	12	QF			RU		RU	SF	SF	CH	SF	SF	CH	CH	16	16	QF	RU	SF	SF		RU	QF	16	SF
Notre Dame	ACC	29	18	8	5	2																				12		12	12	12	QF	12	12		12	QF	SF					16	16	QF	16	RU	QF	SF	QF	RU	SF	QF	QF	16	QF	QF		CH	CH	QF	RU
Loyola (MD)	Patriot	25	16	4	2	1																		QF	QF	RU	QF	12	QF	QF	QF	12	QF	SF	QF	12	QF						16	16		16		CH	16	16		SF	16	QF	QF	QF					
Yale	Ivy League	13	6	3	2	1																		12		SF		QF																				16	QF		16	16	16	CH	RU		QF	16			16
Denver	Big East	13	8	6	1	1																																				16		16		16	SF	QF	SF	SF	CH	16	SF	QF		16			SF		
Navy	Patriot	27	20	8	2	-	SF	QF	QF	QF	RU	SF	SF	SF	SF	QF	SF	QF				QF	QF	QF	QF			12	12	12					12					RU	QF	16	16	QF	16							QF									
Towson	CAA	17	7	3	1	-																			12		RU	QF		12		QF					SF		QF	16	16		16						16		16	QF	SF		16				16	16	
UMass	Atlantic 10	20	11	1	1	-						QF	QF		QF		QF					QF	12	12	QF	12	12		12		12		QF					QF	QF		QF	RU			16			16						16							
Ohio State	Big Ten	8	4	1	1	-																																	16	16				QF					QF		QF		RU				16			16	
Penn State	Big Ten	9	4	3	-	-																																	16		16								16				16		SF			SF	16	SF	QF
Washington and Lee	D3	8	8	3	-	-		QF	SF	SF	SF	QF	QF	QF		QF																																													
Army	Patriot	19	12	2	-	-	SF	QF	QF					QF			QF	QF	QF	SF	QF		12						QF			12							16	16	16					QF									16			QF			16
Brown	Ivy League	15	10	2	-	-	QF		QF			QF									QF		12			QF	QF	QF		SF	QF		12												16						16	SF					16				
Georgetown	Big East	19	14	1	-	-																											12	QF	SF	QF	12	QF	QF	QF	QF	QF	QF											16	16	QF	16	QF	QF	QF	QF
Penn	Ivy League	14	9	1	-	-					QF		QF						QF	QF	QF		QF	SF	12															16		16					16			16					QF		QF				
Rutgers	Big Ten	11	8	1	-	-		QF		QF	QF									QF		QF				QF	12												16	16																QF	SF				
Albany	America East	13	5	1	-	-																																	16	16	16		QF						16	QF	QF	16	QF	SF					16	16	16
Delaware	Atlantic 10	8	4	1	-	-														QF															QF						16		SF			16	16										QF	16			
Cortland	D3	1	1	1	-	-		SF																																																					
Hofstra	CAA	17	9	-	-	-	QF		QF	QF	QF			QF															QF			12	12		QF	12	QF		16			QF		16	16	16	16														
Adelphi	D2	4	4	-	-	-												QF			QF		QF		QF																																				
Harvard	Ivy League	8	3	-	-	-										QF								12		QF						QF										16								16							16			16	
UMBC	America East	7	1	-	-	-																												12	12							16	QF	16	16										16						
Richmond	Atlantic 10	7	1	-	-	-																																												•				16	16		16	16		QF	16
Air Force	ASUN	6	1	-	-	-	QF																	12																										16		16	16							16	
Bryant	America East	6	1	-	-	-																																											16	QF	•		16			16		16			
Stony Brook	CAA	4	1	-	-	-																																12								QF		16													•
Colgate	Patriot	4	1	-	-	-																																						16				QF			16									16	
Drexel	CAA	2	1	-	-	-																																												QF						16					
Michigan	Big Ten	2	1	-	-	-																																																				QF	16		
NC State	defunct	1	1	-	-	-									QF																																														
Hobart	Atlantic 10	5	-	-	-	-																												12		12		12		16												•									
Marist	Metro	5	-	-	-	-																																			16										16				•			•			16
Robert Morris	NEC	5	-	-	-	-																																																16	16		•			•	•
Siena	Metro	4	-	-	-	-																																							16		16			•										•	
Lehigh	Patriot	4	-	-	-	-																																										16	16							16			16		
Michigan State	defunct	3	-	-	-	-																	12		12		12																																		
Providence	Big East	3	-	-	-	-																																		16		16	16																		
Canisius	Metro	3	-	-	-	-																																						16				16						•							
Villanova	Big East	3	-	-	-	-																																							16		16							16							
Bucknell	Patriot	2	-	-	-	-																															12										16														
Fairfield	CAA	2	-	-	-	-																																12			16																				
Manhattan	Metro	2	-	-	-	-																																12																			•				
Mount St. Mary's	Metro	2	-	-	-	-																																	16							16															
Hartford	D3	2	-	-	-	-																																									16					•									
High Point	Atlantic 10	2	-	-	-	-																																													•					16					
Marquette	Big East	2	-	-	-	-																																														16	16								
Monmouth	CAA	2	-	-	-	-																																															•			16					
Vermont	America East	2	-	-	-	-																																																		16	16				
Saint Joseph's	Atlantic 10	2	-	-	-	-																																																			16		16		
Utah	ASUN	2	-	-	-	-																																																				16	16		
LIU	NEC	1	-	-	-	-																10																																							
New Hampshire	defunct	1	-	-	-	-																10																																							
Butler	defunct	1	-	-	-	-																												12																											
Dartmouth	Ivy League	1	-	-	-	-																																	16																						
Detroit Mercy	NEC	1	-	-	-	-																																											16												
Quinnipiac	Metro	1	-	-	-	-																																														16									
Boston University	Patriot	1	-	-	-	-																																																			16				
Sacred Heart	Metro	1	-	-	-	-																																																					•		
Jacksonville	ASUN	1	-	-	-	-																																																							16

=== Finals appearances by state ===
State	Titles	University	Runners-up	University
Maryland	14	Johns Hopkins (9), Maryland (4), Loyola (1)	27	Maryland (14), Johns Hopkins (9), Navy (2), Loyola (1), Towson (1)
(New York (state)) New York	14	Syracuse (10), Cornell (4)	11	Syracuse (6), Cornell (5)
North Carolina	8	North Carolina (5), Duke (3)	5	Duke (4), North Carolina (1)
Virginia	7	Virginia (7)	4	Virginia (4)
New Jersey	7	Princeton (7)	2	Princeton (2)
Indiana	2	Notre Dame (2)	2	Notre Dame (2)
Connecticut	1	Yale (1)	1	Yale (1)
Colorado	1	Denver (1)	0	
Massachusetts	0		1	Massachusetts (1)
Ohio	0		1	Ohio State (1)

== Championships 1881–present ==
Below is a list of team championship titles, inclusive of those awarded prior to the formation of the NCAA Division I Championship. These include the ILA champions (1881–1898), the USIULL and ILA champions (1899–1905), the USILL champions (1906–1925), the USILA champions (1926–1935), and the Wingate Memorial Trophy (1936–1972) recipients. Of note several schools have claimed their Northern and Southern Division titles won during the USILL years as national championships (based on the results of 3 or 4 intra-division games), while others have not. Still others were acclaimed in their time as unofficial title winners based on being leading teams in the collegiate ranks in particular years. Furthermore, the USILL (1906–1925) was a closed membership organization. Some strong teams of the era, such as Army and Navy, were never members, so that in some years, the USILL champion was not necessarily the best team in the United States.

Team	Titles	Years won/claimed^{#}
Johns Hopkins	44	1891, 1898, 1899, 1900, 1902, 1903, 1906, 1907, 1908, 1909, 1911, 1913, 1915, 1918, 1919, 1922, 1923, 1924, 1926, 1927, 1928, 1932§, 1933§, 1934§, 1941, 1947, 1948, 1949, 1950, 1957, 1959, 1967, 1968, 1969, 1970, 1974, 1978, 1979, 1980, 1984, 1985, 1987, 2005, 2007
Navy	17	1928, 1929, 1938, 1943, 1945, 1946, 1949, 1954, 1960, 1961, 1962, 1963, 1964, 1965, 1966, 1967, 1970
Princeton	16	1883, 1884, 1888, 1889, 1935§, 1937, 1942, 1951, 1953, 1992, 1994, 1996, 1997, 1998, 2001, 2026
Syracuse	14	1920, 1922, 1924, 1925, 1983, 1988, 1989, 1990, 1993, 1995, 2000, 2002, 2004, 2008, 2009
Harvard	13	1881†, 1882, 1883, 1885, 1886, 1887, 1908, 1909, 1910, 1911, 1912‡, 1913, 1915
Maryland	13	1928, 1936, 1937, 1939, 1940, 1955, 1956, 1959, 1967, 1973, 1975, 2017, 2022
Lehigh	10	1890, 1893, 1895, 1896, 1897, 1914, 1916, 1917, 1920, 1921‡
Virginia	9	1952, 1970, 1972, 1999, 2003, 2006, 2011, 2019, 2021
Cornell	9	1902, 1903, 1907, 1914, 1916, 1971, 1976, 1977, 2025
Army	8	1923, 1944, 1945, 1951, 1958, 1959, 1961, 1969
North Carolina	5	1981, 1982, 1986, 1991, 2016
Swarthmore	4	1901, 1904, 1905, 1910
Stevens Tech	4	1892, 1894, 1917, 1918
Duke	3	2010, 2013, 2014
St John's (MD)	2	1930, 1931
Yale	2	1883, 2018
Notre Dame	2	2023, 2024
Rutgers	1	1928
Union College	1	1929
Dickinson	1	1958
RPI	1	1952
Loyola	1	2012
Denver	1	2015
#Championship or co-championship claims, as published in school media guide, record book or yearbook
§The USILA did not name champions for the 1932–1935 seasons. School claims national championship based on being that year's leading team.
†Won a tournament conducted for the first collegiate national championship by the U.S. National Lacrosse Association.
‡Won a post-season championship game between the winners of the USILL Northern and Southern Divisions.

=== Championships by state ===
State	Titles	University
Maryland	77	Johns Hopkins (44), Navy (17), Maryland (13), St. John's MD (2), Loyola (1)
(New York (state)) New York	33	Syracuse (14), Cornell (9), Army (8), Union College (1), RPI (1)
New Jersey	21	Princeton (16), Stevens Tech (4), Rutgers (1)
Pennsylvania	14	Lehigh (10), Swarthmore (4)
Massachusetts	13	Harvard (13)
Virginia	9	Virginia (9)
North Carolina	8	North Carolina (5), Duke (3)
Connecticut	2	Yale (2)
Indiana	2	Notre Dame (2)
Colorado	1	Denver (1)

== See also ==
- NCAA Division I Men's Lacrosse Championship all-time team records
- NCAA Division I Men's Lacrosse Championship appearances by school
- NCAA Division I Undefeated National Champions
- NCAA Division II Men's Lacrosse Championship
- NCAA Division III Men's Lacrosse Championship
- NCAA Division I Women's Lacrosse Championship
- North–South Senior All-Star Game
- United States Intercollegiate Lacrosse Association
- Wingate Memorial Trophy
