= John F. Christhilf =

American lacrosse player (1914–1992)

John Fout Christhilf (June 5, 1914 – August 24, 1992) was an American lacrosse player, civil engineer, and Air Force officer. He played college lacrosse at the University of Maryland from 1934 to 1936, and led the nation in scoring as a senior. Christhilf was inducted into the National Lacrosse Hall of Fame in 1972.

== Early life and college ==
Christhilf was born in Baltimore, Maryland in June 1914. He attended the Friends School, and played lacrosse from 1928 to 1932. Christhilf then attended college at the University of Maryland, where he played on the lacrosse team, and was a member of the Reserve Officer Training Corps, Scabbard and Blade, Kappa Alpha Order, and the Engineering Society. Christhilf earned varsity letters in 1934, 1935, and 1936. The United States Intercollegiate Lacrosse Association named him to the All-America second team in 1935 at the out home position, and The Baltimore Sun placed him on its All-Maryland Lacrosse Team first team. The following year, the USILA placed him on the All-America first team. Christhilf led the nation in scoring in 1936 with 25 goals to his credit. The Baltimore Sun described him as a "brilliant attack man" with "deadly shooting".

== Later life ==
Christhilf earned a Bachelor of Science degree in civil engineering from Maryland in 1936. After college, he married his high school sweetheart, Charlotte A. Bolgiano. They remained married for 43 years until she died. They had two children, John Harwood and Charlotte Louise (Bonnie). He played lacrosse for the Baltimore Athletic Club from 1937 to 1941. In his first season there, the club won the National Open Championship. He also briefly returned to the Friends School as an assistant lacrosse coach in 1938 and 1963.

Christhilf entered the United States Army Air Service in 1941 and attained the rank of lieutenant colonel by the time he left the military in 1946. He briefly re-entered the service in 1953. Christhilf worked as a professional civil engineer.

Christhilf was inducted into the National Lacrosse Hall of Fame in 1972. He was inducted into the University of Maryland Athletic Hall of Fame in 1984. Christhilf survived his wife Ruth, who died in 1990, then died himself in Baltimore in August 1992.
