= Maddren =

Maddren is a surname. Notable people with the surname include:

- Judy Maddren, Canadian radio announcer
- Tim Maddren (born 1984), New Zealand musician
- William H. Maddren (1875–1909), American lacrosse coach and physician
- Willie Maddren (1951–2000), English footballer and manager
