= Don Zimmerman (lacrosse) =

American college lacrosse coach (1953-)

Biographical details
- Born: 1953 (age 72–73); Baltimore, Maryland, U.S.

Playing career
- 1975–1976: Johns Hopkins
- Position: Midfielder

Coaching career (HC unless noted)
- 1977: Johns Hopkins (B squad)
- 1978: Princeton (assistant)
- 1979–1982: North Carolina (assistant)
- 1983: Johns Hopkins (assistant)
- 1984–1990: Johns Hopkins
- 1991–1993: Loyola (MD) (assistant)
- 1994–2016: UMBC

Head coaching record
- Overall: 237–171

Accomplishments and honors

Championships
- 3 NCAA D-I (1984, 1985, 1987); 3 America East tournament (2006, 2008, 2009); 5 America East regular season (2005, 2006, 2007, 2008, 2009)

Awards
- IMLCA Lifetime Achievement Award; America East Coach of the Year (2006, 2008, 2009); 1976 honorable mention All-American
- U.S. Lacrosse Hall of Fame; Inducted in 2017

Donald Zimmerman (born c. 1953) is an American television analyst and former college lacrosse coach. He became a color analyst for ESPN in May 2016 and does both high school and college lacrosse games. Prior to becoming an analyst, he served as the head coach for the UMBC Retrievers at the University of Maryland, Baltimore County for 24 years. Between 1984 and 1987, Zimmerman coached Johns Hopkins to three national championships. Zimmerman was inducted into the National Lacrosse Hall of Fame in 2017.

== Early life ==
Zimmerman attended St. Paul's School in Brooklandville, Maryland. While there, the lacrosse team on which he played won three Maryland Interscholastic Athletic Association (MIAA) championships. Zimmerman then attended Randolph-Macon College before he transferred to Johns Hopkins University. He played lacrosse as a midfielder for the Blue Jays in 1975 and 1976. His senior year, he received honorable mention All-American honors and the Turnbull-Reynold Award for leadership and sportsmanship. He graduated in 1976.

== Coaching career ==
=== Early coaching positions ===
After graduating, Zimmerman remained at Hopkins for a season to coach the lacrosse program's B squad in 1977. He spent the following season as an assistant coach at Princeton University. From 1979 to 1982, he served as an assistant under Willie Scroggs at the University of North Carolina. While there, the Tar Heels won the national championship in 1981 and 1982.

=== Johns Hopkins ===
In 1983, he returned to his alma mater, and became the head coach in 1984 after the retirement of Henry Ciccarone. That year, he led the Blue Jays to a perfect 14–0 season and became the first head coach to win an NCAA championship in his first season. In 1985, Hopkins again won the national title while suffering one loss. The following year, the Blue Jays compiled a 10–2 record, and were eliminated in the semifinals in overtime by the eventual national champions, North Carolina. In 1987, Zimmerman led the team to a 10–3 record and a third title. Upon expiration of his contract, he left Hopkins after compiling a 6–5 record in 1990. The reason he cited was the pressure associated with the high-profile position. In total, Zimmerman's teams at Johns Hopkins posted a 73–15 record.

Former Hopkins head coach Dave Pietramala spent his entire college playing career under Zimmerman, from 1986 to 1989. Former North Carolina and Hopkins head coach John Haus played for the Tar Heels under Zimmerman and then served as his assistant at Johns Hopkins. Zimmerman was the United States men's national lacrosse team's assistant coach for the 1986 World Lacrosse Championship.

=== UMBC ===
Zimmerman spent three years at Loyola as an assistant for the Greyhounds under Dave Cottle, before he was hired as head coach by the University of Maryland, Baltimore County (UMBC). The Retrievers continued to struggle early in Zimmerman's tenure, and during his first three seasons compiled a 14–25 mark. After a 3–9 campaign in 1996, UMBC became the most improved team in the nation with a 9–3 record for the 1997 season. In 1998, the Retrievers delivered a major upset by beating, 12–8, then first-ranked Maryland, the eventual national championship runners-up. The victory helped UMBC secure its first ever berth in the NCAA tournament. In 1999, the Retrievers again made an appearance in the tournament. Zimmerman coached the South squad in the 2002 North-South Senior All-Star Game.

In 2005, UMBC posted a 5–1 conference mark to achieve the America East regular season conference championship. The following year, the Retrievers defeated Binghamton and Albany in the America East tournament for the conference championship, and Zimmerman made his tenth appearance as a head coach in the NCAA tournament. He was named the 2006 America East Coach of the Year. In 2007, UMBC again advanced past Binghamton before falling to Albany in the America East championship game, and secured another berth in the NCAA tournament. There, they upset seventh-seeded Maryland in the first round for the school's first appearance in the NCAA quarterfinals.

In 2008, UMBC again faced Albany in the America East championship game. Halfway through the second period, the Retrievers trailed 11–2, but rallied to edge their opponents, 14–13. Zimmerman was named the 2008 America East Coach of the Year. In June, he was considered the frontrunner to replace John Haus who had been fired as North Carolina's head coach, but Zimmerman removed his name from consideration. He said, "The people at UMBC have been good to me, and this is my home ... these are my kids and I recruited them. I just didn't think this was the right time to move."

In 2009, UMBC captured its fifth consecutive outright or shared America East regular season title. In the conference semifinals, the Retrievers edged Binghamton, 9–8. In the final, however, UMBC jumped out to an early lead over Albany and never relinquished it, and won, 15–7. Zimmerman was named the 2009 America East Coach of the Year. In the first round of the NCAA tournament, the Retrievers faced sixth-seeded North Carolina. UMBC entered the game with the number-one ranked midfield in the nation, but it was lacking in depth, and the first-string was thus forced to play most of the 90 °F (32 °C) game. The Retrievers led 8–6 at halftime, but North Carolina assumed control during the third period and went on to win, 15–13.

While coach at UMBC, Zimmerman has traveled to Japan, Argentina, and the United Kingdom in order to promote the sport of lacrosse. In 2002, 2004, and 2006, UMBC hosted fall scrimmages against teams from Keio University. In the summer of 2005, the Retrievers traveled to Japan. Regarding the possibility of the sport being a future Olympic event, Zimmerman said, "It’s incumbent upon us to introduce and develop the game when opportunities occur in order to reach that goal." The Greater Baltimore Chapter of the United States Lacrosse Hall of Fame inducted Zimmerman on January 25, 2003.

== Personal life ==
Zimmerman lives in Towson, Maryland with his wife, Dorothy. They have two adult children, a son and a daughter.

== Head coaching record ==
Record table
Season	Team	Overall	Conference	Standing	Postseason
Johns Hopkins Blue Jays (NCAA independent) (1984–1990)
1984	Johns Hopkins	14–0			NCAA Division I champion
1985	Johns Hopkins	13–1			NCAA Division I champion
1986	Johns Hopkins	10–2			NCAA Division I semifinals
1987	Johns Hopkins	10–3			NCAA Division I champion
1988	Johns Hopkins	9–2			NCAA Division I quarterfinals
1989	Johns Hopkins	11–2			NCAA Division I runner-up
1990	Johns Hopkins	6–5			NCAA Division I first round
Johns Hopkins:		73–15 (.830)			
UMBC Retrievers (NCAA independent) (1994–2003)
1994	UMBC	7–7			
1995	UMBC	4–9			
1996	UMBC	3–9			
1997	UMBC	9–3			
1998	UMBC	9–5			NCAA Division I first round
1999	UMBC	11–4			NCAA Division I first round
2000	UMBC	7–7			
2001	UMBC	5–7			
2002	UMBC	5–7			
2003	UMBC	7–6			
UMBC Retrievers (America East Conference) (2004–2016)
2004	UMBC	6–8	4–2	T–2nd	
2005	UMBC	7–8	5–1	T–1st	
2006	UMBC	10–5	5–0	1st	NCAA Division I first round
2007	UMBC	11–6	4–1	T–1st	NCAA Division I quarterfinals
2008	UMBC	12–4	5–0	1st	NCAA Division I first round
2009	UMBC	12–4	4–1	T–1st	NCAA Division I first round
2010	UMBC	4–9	3–2	T–2nd	
2011	UMBC	6–7	3–2	T–2nd	
2012	UMBC	5–8	3–2	T–2nd	
2013	UMBC	7–8	3–2	T–2nd	
2014	UMBC	8–7	3–2	3rd	
2015	UMBC	5–8	1–5	6th	
2016	UMBC	4–10	1–5	6th	
UMBC:		164–156 (.513)	44–25 (.638)		
Total:		237–171 (.581)			
National champion Postseason invitational champion Conference regular season champion Conference regular season and conference tournament champion Division regular season champion Division regular season and conference tournament champion Conference tournament champion
