= Angus Lamond =

American lacrosse player

Angus Lamond (1909–1965) is an American lacrosse player and is considered to be one of the great defensemen of the pre-NCAA era of college lacrosse. A native of Washington, D.C., he attended St. John's College, U.S., better known at the time as St. John's (MD), where he was three times named to the USILA All-American Team. Three times during his career as a player, St. John's won the National Lacrosse Championship, in 1929, 1930 and 1931.

Lamond went on to serve as assistant coach for the United States Naval Academy for 11 years, winning two national championships in 1938 and 1946.

In 1977 Lamond was inducted into the National Lacrosse Hall of Fame.
