= Victor Ross =

American lacrosse player

Victor Ross

Victor K. Ross (November 13, 1900 – 1974) was an American lacrosse player.

== Early life ==
Ross was Jewish, and was born in Kiszalo, Hungary.

He graduated from Bridgeport High School in 1918. He then attended Syracuse University, where he played on both the soccer and lacrosse teams. He subsequently attended Syracuse Law School, where he earned an LLB degree in 1924. After graduating from law school he had a private law practice.

== Lacrosse career ==
He played for the Syracuse Orange men's lacrosse team. He led all United States college lacrosse players in scoring in both 1921 and 1922. In 1923, he led Syracuse to the International Lacrosse Trophy Championship in Great Britain.

He was a three-time All-American, winning the honor in 1922, 1923, and 1924. When he was named an All American in 1923, he was describe as "the cleverest attack player yet seen in college circles". The Encyclopedia of Jews in Sports wrote that Ross was "the all-time All-America lacrosse player."

After college, he played for the New Rochelle Lacrosse Team and the Brooklyn Lacrosse Club amateur teams in New York State, and coached two years at Syracuse University and Brooklyn College. He also assisted in bringing lacrosse to Union College, Williams College, and Springfield College. He also was an organizer of the Box Lacrosse League.

== Halls of Fame ==
He was elected to the U.S. Lacrosse Hall of Fame in 1962. He was inducted into the International Jewish Sports Hall of Fame in 1995.
