= 1983 NCAA Division I men's lacrosse tournament =

- Dates: May 18–28, 1983
- Teams: 8
- Finals site: Rutgers Stadium, Piscataway, New Jersey
- Champions: Syracuse (1st title)
- Runner-up: Johns Hopkins (10th title game)
- Semifinalists: Maryland (10th Final Four); North Carolina (4th Final Four)
- Winning coach: Roy Simmons Jr. (1st title)
- MOP: Brad Kotz, Syracuse
- Attendance: 15,672 finals 35,163 total
- Top scorer: Tim Nelson, Syracuse (15 goals)

The 1983 NCAA Division I lacrosse tournament was the 13th annual tournament hosted by the National Collegiate Athletic Association to determine the team champion of men's college lacrosse among its Division I programs at the end of the 1983 NCAA Division I men's lacrosse season.

Syracuse defeated Johns Hopkins in the championship game, 17–16, to claim the Orangemen's first NCAA national title.

The final was played at Rutgers Stadium at Rutgers University in Piscataway, New Jersey.

== Overview ==
In the NCAA lacrosse finals, Syracuse capped off a 14–1 season with its first NCAA championship and fifth overall lacrosse title as they defeated Johns Hopkins, 17–16. The Orangemen, led by Brad Kotz and Tim Nelson, scored eight straight goals in less than nine minutes in the second half to clinch the title after Hopkins had gone up 12–5 midway through the third quarter.

Syracuse was seeded second and hosted the first round and semifinal games. The Orangemen beat Penn, the seventh-seed, 11–8 at Syracuse's J.S. Coyne Stadium. In the semifinals in the Carrier Dome, the Orangemen beat Maryland 12–5 behind Randy Lundblad's one goal and four assists and Travis Solomon's 22 saves.

In the finals, the Blue Jays had a 12–5 lead with less than seven minutes to play in the third period when the Orangemen rallied. Syracuse outscored the Blue Jays 4–1 to close out the third period and then added six straight goals in the fourth to go up 15–13. Hopkins tied the score at 15, but goals by Brad Kotz and Lundblad gave the Orangemen a two-goal cushion with Del Dressell scoring the final Hopkins goal. Tim Nelson had two goals and six assists in the finals, to finish as the tournament's leading scorer with 15 points. Kotz scored five goals, all in the second half and was named Most Outstanding Player. Travis Solomon made 18 saves for the Orange.

Late in the third quarter, team captain and defenseman Darren Lawlor scored a key goal left-handed which provided a spark for the Orangemen. Overcoming a seven-goal deficit against a Hopkins team participating in its seventh straight title game, Lawlor and the other Orangemen seniors provided the spark. But the offensive punch came primarily from sophomores, including midfielder Brad Kotz of West Genesee and Tim Nelson, the transfer from North Carolina State. Nelson's pass to Randy Lundblad for an open-net goal with 1:09 left locked up the title for the Orangemen.

For Hopkins, Dressel was exhibiting one on one skills on par with the Orangemen's most athletic players, finishing with three goals and one assist in the finals.

Syracuse and Johns Hopkins would go on to meet in the NCAA finals five more times, the last time in 2008. This was Hopkins' seventh straight NCAA final.

== Bracket ==
Quarterfinals; May 18
1	Johns Hopkins	7
8	Cornell	6
5	North Carolina	12
4	Army	6
2	Syracuse	11
7	Penn	8
6	Maryland	13
3	Virginia	4

Semifinals; May 21
1	Johns Hopkins	12
5	North Carolina	9
2	Syracuse	12
6	Maryland	5

Championship; May 28
1	Johns Hopkins	16
2	Syracuse	17

== Box scores ==
=== Finals ===
Team	1	2	3	4	Total
Syracuse	2	2	5	8	17
Johns Hopkins	4	4	5	3	16
Syracuse scoring – Brad Kotz 5, Randy Lundblad 3, Dave Desko 2, Tim Nelson 2, Art Lux 2, Darren Lawlor, Mike Powers, Tom Korrie; Johns Hopkins scoring – Del Dressel 3, Peter Scott 3, John Krumenacker 2, Bill Cantelli 2, Willy Odenthal 2, Kirk Baugher, Brent Ciccarone, Lee Davidson, Henry Ciccarone Jr.; Shots: Johns Hopkins 50, Syracuse 48; Saves: Syracuse Travis Solomon 21, Johns Hopkins Brian Holman 26, Larry Quinn 0; Location: Piscataway, New Jersey (Rutgers Stadium) - 5/28/1983; Attendance: 23,000

=== Semifinals ===
Team	1	2	3	4	Total
Syracuse	2	3	4	3	12
Maryland	0	1	2	2	5
Syracuse scoring – Art Lux 3, Mike Powers 2, Dave Desko 2, Randy Lundblad, John Schimoler, Brad Kotz, Jeff McCormick, Wayne Roemer; Maryland scoring – Jim Wilkerson 2, Tim Worstell, Tony Olmert, Mike Hubbard; Shots: Syracuse 37, Maryland 37; Saves: Syracuse Travis Solomon 22 - Avery 1, Maryland Kevin O'Leary 11 - Bilger 1; Location: Syracuse, New York (Carrier Dome) - 5/21/1983; Attendance: 5,248

Team	1	2	3	4	Total
Johns Hopkins	2	5	2	3	12
North Carolina	1	3	3	2	9
Johns Hopkins scoring – Peter Scott 3, Del Dressel 3, Henry Ciccarone Jr. 2, Bill Cantelli 2, John Krumenacker, Willy Odenthal; North Carolina scoring – Peter Voelkel 2, Bill Ness 2, David Wingate, Joe Seivold, Mike Burnett, Mac Ford, Terry Martinello; Shots: Johns Hopkins 45, North Carolina 35; Saves: Johns Hopkins Brian Holman 15, North Carolina Tom Sears 14 - J Haus 1; Location: Baltimore, MD (Homewood Field) - 5/21/1983; Attendance: 3,400

=== Quarterfinals ===
Team	1	2	3	4	Total
Johns Hopkins	2	1	2	2	7
Cornell	1	1	2	2	6
Johns Hopkins scoring – Del Dressel 4, Brent Ciccarone 2, Richard Glancy; Cornell scoring – Kevin Cook 2, Nick Lantuh 2, Ken Entenmann, Matt Crowley; Shots: Johns Hopkins 33, Cornell 26; Saves: Johns Hopkins Brian Holman 11, Cornell Vinnie Ilardi 10; Location: Baltimore, MD (Homewood Field) - 5/19/1983; Attendance:

Team	1	2	3	4	Total
North Carolina	2	2	2	6	12
Army	0	2	1	3	6
North Carolina scoring – David Wingate 4, Peter Voelkel 2, Joe Seivold, Steve Martel, Mike Burnett, Brian Rice, Jeff Homire, Brent Voelkel; Army scoring – Frank Giordano 3, Pete Short, Eric Korvin, P.J. O’Sullivan; Shots: Army 53, North Carolina 48; Saves: North Carolina Tom Sears 20 - Meally 3, Army Slabowski 12; Location: West Point, New York (Michie Stadium) - 5/19/1983; Attendance:

Team	1	2	3	4	Total
Syracuse	3	3	4	1	11
Pennsylvania	1	2	2	3	8
Syracuse scoring – Randy Lundblad 3, John Schimoler 2, Dave Desko 2, Tim Nelson, Bob Seebold, Art Lux, Wayne Roemer; Pennsylvania scoring – Michael Braver 2, Bill Morrill 2, Bob Papenfuss 2, Leo Paytas, Matt McAnaney; Shots: Syracuse 31, Pennsylvania 28; Saves: Syracuse Travis Solomon 13, Pennsylvania Della Rocca 11; Location: Syracuse, New York (Carrier Dome) - 5/19/1983; Attendance:

Team	1	2	3	4	Total
Maryland	3	2	5	3	13
Virginia	0	0	1	3	4
Maryland scoring – Mike Hubbard 3, Kevin Sullivan 2, Tony Olmert 2, Mike Hart 2, Jack Francis, Mike Ruppert, Alan McGuckian, Tim Worstell; Virginia scoring – Bill Wyker 2, Paul French 2; Shots: Virginia 42, Maryland 40; Saves: Maryland Kevin O'Leary 16 - Bilger 4, Virginia Meyer 13; Location: Charlottesville, Virginia (Scott Stadium) - 5/19/1983; Attendance: 1,710

== Tournament outstanding players ==
- Brad Kotz, Syracuse (Named the tournament's Most Outstanding Player)

Leading scorers	GP	G	A	Pts
Tim Nelson, Syracuse	3	3	12	15
Del Dressel, Johns Hopkins	3	10	2	12
Randy Lundblad, Syracuse	3	7	5	12
Brad Kotz, Syracuse	3	6	4	10
Art Lux, Syracuse	3	8	2	8
Dave Desko, Syracuse	3	6	2	8
Peter Scott, Johns Hopkins	3	6	1	7
John Krumenacker, Johns Hopkins	3	3	4	7
Henry Ciccarone Jr., Johns Hopkins	3	3	4	7
Dave Wingate, North Carolina	2	5	1	6

== See also ==
- 1983 NCAA women's lacrosse tournament
- 1983 NCAA Division III lacrosse tournament
