= Brad Kotz =

American lacrosse player

Personal information
- Nationality: American
- Born: January 30, 1963 (age 63)
- Height: 5 ft 11 in (180 cm)
- Weight: 180 lb (82 kg; 12 st 12 lb)

Sport
- Position: Midfield, Forward
- Shoots: Right
- Coached by: University of Pennsylvania, Assistant Coach
- NLL teams: Philadelphia Wings
- NCAA team: Syracuse University
- Pro career: 1989–1991

Career highlights
- 1983 NCAA Division I Men's Lacrosse Championship; 1984 NCAA Division I Men's Lacrosse Championship finalist; 1985 NCAA Division I Men's Lacrosse Championship finalist; 1983 Lt. Raymond Enners Award; 1989 NLL Champions Cup Champion (Philadelphia Wings); 1990 NLL Champions Cup Champion (Philadelphia Wings); 1986 World Lacrosse Championship Champions (United States); 1990 World Lacrosse Championship Champions (United States)

Bradley A. Kotz (born January 30, 1963) is an American former lacrosse player. He was a four-time All-American college lacrosse player at Syracuse University from 1982 to 1985.

== Syracuse Orange ==
The Orange won an NCAA Men's Lacrosse Championship in 1983 and made two additional appearances in the NCAA finals in 1984 and 1985, with Kotz as their leading player.

In the 1983 championship, Kotz teamed with Tim Nelson to lead the Orange to a 17–16 upset over Johns Hopkins, and the team's first national title since 1925. Kotz scored five goals, all in the second half, and was named the tournament MVP in leading Syracuse back from a 12 to 5 second half deficit.

Kotz was named the USILA player of the year in 1983, and was inducted into the National Lacrosse Hall of Fame in 2001.

Kotz was also a member of the ILF World Champion US squads for the 1986 and 1990 World Lacrosse Championships, teaming with John Tucker, Larry Quinn, Tony Resch and Dave Pietramala.

== Major Indoor Lacrosse League ==
Brad was one of the major early draws for indoor lacrosse, playing professionally from 1987 to 1991 with the Major Indoor Lacrosse League Washington Wave and with the Philadelphia Wings, and winning two championships with the Wings. He led the league in scoring in 1989 and was named first team All-Pro in 1990. In 1987 Kotz teamed with Frank Urso in leading the Washington Wave to a 20–15 win over the Wings in the semi-finals, and a close one-goal loss to the Baltimore Thunder in the finals. Kotz attended the University of Pennsylvania Wharton School while playing for Philadelphia. During this time, he was also an assistant coach at the University of Pennsylvania under Tony Seaman, helping guide the Quakers to the 1988 Ivy League title and NCAA tournament appearance.

== West Genesee ==
Kotz played lacrosse at West Genesee High School, one of the premier high school teams in the country, along with notable Syracuse players, Tom Korrie and Jeff McCormick. Over more than forty years, West Genesee lacrosse teams have captured a total of 25 New York Section 3 titles and 15 New York State championships. Kotz' team went 24 and 0 while winning the New York high school state title in his senior season of 1981. For his effort, Kotz was named High School All American that year.

== Personal ==
Brad founded and is currently a principal at the real estate investment firm, Seneca Properties, Inc., based in Bethesda, MD. Brad Kotz married Renee Rogers in early 1997, and one year later had their first daughter. Two years after that a second daughter was born.

Kotz is originally from Camillus, NY.

== Statistics ==
=== Syracuse University ===
Season	GP	G	A	Pts	PPG
1982	10	21	10	31	3.10
1983	15	41	21	62	4.13
1984	16	31	30	61	3.82
1985	16	36	15	51	3.19
Totals	57	129	76	205	3.60

=== National Lacrosse league career ===
Regular Season	Playoffs

Season	GP	G	A	Pts	LB	PIM	GP	G	A	Pts	LB	PIM
1989	9	31	19	50	--	--	1	3	3	6	--	--
1990	--	11	9	20	--	--	--	--	--	--	--	--
1991	--	6	6	12	--	--	--	--	--	--	--	--
Totals	19	45	31	76	106	10	3	8	9	17	2	13 (a)

^{(a)} Philadelphia Wings stats only (may not include complete MILL/NLL stats)

== See also ==
- Syracuse athletes
- Members of the National Lacrosse Hall of Fame
- List of NLL seasons
- 1989 Philadelphia Wings
- Syracuse Orange men's lacrosse
- Tim Nelson (lacrosse)

Preceded by Tom Sears	Lt. Raymond Enners Award; 1983	Succeeded by Larry Quinn
