= Tim Nelson (lacrosse) =

American lacrosse player

Personal information
- Nationality: American

Sport
- Position: Attack
- Shoots: Left
- Coached by: Dartmouth College 1989-1998, Utica College 1999-2005
- NCAA team: Syracuse University

Career highlights
- 1983 NCAA Division I Men's Lacrosse Championship; 1983 Jack Turnbull Award; 1984 Jack Turnbull Award; 1985 Jack Turnbull Award; 1st in NCAA Division I Career Assists

Tim Nelson (born c. 1963) was a three-time first-team All-American NCAA lacrosse player at Syracuse University from 1983 to 1985.

== Lacrosse career ==
Nelson teamed with Brad Kotz to lead the Orange to the NCAA Men's Lacrosse Championship in 1983, as well as two additional appearances in the finals in 1984 and 1985.

Statistically, Nelson's best season was 1984, where his 103 points was the 2nd highest total to that point, and he led Syracuse to an undefeated 13 and 0 regular season record. Nelson got hurt early in the National Championship and sat out the rest of the game, with Syracuse ending the year 15 and 1.

Nelson is eighth in all-time NCAA Division I total points, with 99 goals and 221 assists for 320 total points in 58 games. He was awarded the Jack Turnbull Award as National Attackman of the Year in 1983, 1984, and 1985.

Nelson began his college career at North Carolina State in 1982, but transferred to Syracuse after the North Carolina State program was cancelled. Nelson played his high school lacrosse at Yorktown High School.

He also coached for 15 years at the collegiate level, heading the men's lacrosse programs at Dartmouth from 1989 to 1998 and Utica College from 1999 to 2005.

Nelson is currently the Assistant Vice President of Advancement at Utica College.

Nelson was inducted into the National Lacrosse Hall of Fame in 2012. He was one of four Orange lacrosse players selected by a panel of lacrosse coaches, including Kotz as well as Paul and Gary Gait, to the NCAA Lacrosse Committee's 25th Anniversary Lacrosse Team.

== Accomplishments ==
- 1983 NCAA Champions
- 1983, 1984, 1985 National Collegiate Attackman of the Year

== Statistics ==
=== Syracuse University / North Carolina State ===
Season	GP	G	A	Pts	PPG
1985	16	21	64	85	5.31
1984	16	36	67 ^{(a)}	103	6.44
1983	15	27	56	83	5.53
1982	10	15	34	49	4.90
Totals	57	99	221 ^{(c)}	320 ^{(d)}	5.61 ^{(e)}

^{(a)} 7th in NCAA single season assists
^{(c)} 3rd in NCAA career assists
^{(d)} 12th in NCAA career points
^{(e)} 13th in NCAA career points per game

== See also ==
- NC State Wolfpack men's lacrosse
- 1983 NCAA Division I Men's Lacrosse Championship
- 1984 NCAA Division I Men's Lacrosse Championship

Preceded by Jeff Cook	Jack Turnbull Award; 1983, 1984, 1985	Succeeded by Roddy Marino
