= Delverne Dressel =

American lacrosse player and psychiatrist

Del Dressel
Personal information
- Nickname: Del
- Nationality: American

Sport
- Position: Midfield
- Shoots: Right and Left
- NCAA team: Johns Hopkins University

Career highlights
- 1984 NCAA Division I Men's Lacrosse Championship; 1985 NCAA Division I Men's Lacrosse Championship; 1984, 1985 McLaughlin Award; 1983, 1984, 1985, 1986 USILA First Team All-American

Delverne A. Dressel Jr., MD (Del Dressel) is an American psychiatrist, a former Johns Hopkins lacrosse player, a member of the Johns Hopkins Athletics Hall of Fame, the NCAA Silver Anniversary Team, and the National Lacrosse Hall of Fame.

== Early life and education ==
Dressel was raised in Baltimore, Maryland, and attended Gilman School. At Gilman, he was a two time High School All American and winner of the C. Markland Kelly award designating the best high school lacrosse player in Maryland. His Gilman teammates included future National Lacrosse Hall of Famers Mac Ford and Joe Seivold. In addition to lacrosse, Dressel played on the football team and was a First-Team Baltimore All-Metro pick at defensive back.

After a brief enrollment at Harvard University, Dressel transferred to Johns Hopkins, where he played lacrosse and earned his bachelor's degree in 1986. Dressel's brothers, Mark and John, also played lacrosse at Johns Hopkins.

After college, he went to Tulane Medical School and received his M.D. degree in 1990.

== Career ==
=== Medicine ===
Dressel is a licensed psychiatrist and has been associated with Spring Grove Hospital Center.

=== Lacrosse ===
Dressel played midfielder for the Johns Hopkins University and led the team to NCAA Men's Lacrosse Championship titles in 1984 and 1985. Dressel was an exceptional midfielder who excelled at both offense and defense, playing before the game changed to specialized offensive and defensive specialists. He was awarded the Lt. Donald McLaughlin Jr. Award as the nation's top midfielder in both 1984 and 1985.

Dressel is one of only seven college lacrosse players to be named a first-team All-American four times, the others being Doug Turnbull (Johns Hopkins, 1922–25), Everett Smith (St. John's, 1933–37), Frank Urso (Maryland, 1973–76), Jason Coffman (Salisbury St., 1993–96), Michael Powell (Syracuse, 2001–04) and Trevor Baptiste (Denver, 2015–2018).

Dressel ended his career at Hopkins as one of their all-time top scorers with 99 goals and 75 assists for 174 points.

Dressel led Johns Hopkins to one other appearance in the national championship game in a tremendous 1983 finals and an appearance in the NCAA semifinals in 1986. Hopkins posted a 49–5 record during Dressel's career with all five losses coming by just one goal. The Blue Jays posted a perfect 14–0 record in 1984 en route to winning the NCAA Championship, while the 1985 team posted a 13–1 mark while repeating as NCAA Champions.

Dressel briefly was head coach at the prep school level, at Brentwood School.

== Honors and awards ==
- 1983: USILA First Team All-American
- 1984: USILA First Team All-American
- 1985: USILA First Team All-American
- 1986: USILA First Team All-American
- 1995: NCAA Silver Anniversary team
- 1998: Johns Hopkins University Athletic Hall of Fame
- 2001: Greater Baltimore Hall of Fame
- 2002: USA Lacrosse Hall of Fame
- 2007: Maryland State Athletic Hall of Fame

== Statistics ==
=== Johns Hopkins University ===
Season	GP	G	A	Pts	PPG
1983	14	27	19	46	--
1984	14	27	17	44	--
1985	14	23	19	42	--
1986	12	22	20	42	--
Totals	54	99	75	174	3.22

== See also ==
- Johns Hopkins Blue Jays
- Johns Hopkins Blue Jays lacrosse
- 1983 NCAA Division I Men's Lacrosse Championship
- 1984 NCAA Division I Men's Lacrosse Championship

Preceded by Peter Voelkel	McLaughlin Award; 1984, 1985	Succeeded by Glen Miles
