= Missy Foote =

American lacrosse coach

Carson "Missy" Wassell Foote is an American lacrosse coach. She served as the head women's lacrosse coach at Middlebury College from 1978 through 2015, amassing a 422-114-1 record. At the time of her retirement, that win total ranked second amongst all head coaches in NCAA Division III history.

== Early life and education ==
Foote attended and graduated from Ward Melville High School in 1970. Following high school, she enrolled at Springfield College and graduated in 1974.

== Career ==
Upon graduating, Foote began teaching seventh through 12th grade in a Vermont public school. She came across an advertisement in The Boston Globe for a coaching position at Middlebury College and applied. She was immediately hired following her interview and joined the faculty in 1977. She was one of three women's coaches at Middlebury, and she was responsible for women's basketball, swimming, sailing, and lacrosse. After a few years, she dropped basketball and swimming and picked up field hockey, which she coached from 1980 until 2001. During her tenure as the field hockey coach, Foote compiled a 174-86-12 record and she led the Panthers to the 1998 NCAA Division III championship.

During the 2001 lacrosse season, Foote earned national honors after the team hit a 17–0 record during the regular season and won their third NCAA Division III championship. She was recognized with her fourth Coach of the Year honor by the NCAA and her 200th career win. The following year, she was again honored as Coach of the Year after she led the Panthers to a perfect 18–0 record and her fourth NCAA championship. By 2004, Foote led Middlebury to 10 consecutive national semifinals with championships in 1997, 1999, 2001 and 2002. As a result of her overall record of 246-64 during her tenure, she was elected to the New England Lacrosse Hall of Fame and Springfield College Athletic Hall of Fame. Foote was later chosen to serve as an assistant coach with the U.S. Women's Developmental Team and serve as a member of the NCAA Division III Women's Lacrosse Committee. By 2008, Foote was recognized by US Lacrosse Magazine as one of the nations top 10 men's or women's lacrosse coaches during the US Lacrosse Era.

In 2012, Foote was inducted into the National Lacrosse Hall of Fame and Museum and two years later earned her 400th career win. She subsequently became one of four women's lacrosse coaches with over 400 wins in the history of the game. At the time of her retirement in 2016, Foote amassed a 422-114-1 record which ranked second among all head coaches in NCAA Division III history. In 2017, Foote was inducted into the Vermont Sports Hall of Fame and Intercollegiate Women's Lacrosse Coaches Association Hall of Fame. During the COVID-19 pandemic, Foote was also inducted into the Middlebury College Athletics Hall of Fame.

== Personal life ==
Foote is married to Richard Foote.
