= William H. Maddren =

American physician (1875–1909)

William Maddren
Biographical details
- Born: August 3, 1875; Brooklyn, New York, U.S.
- Died: January 8, 1909 (aged 33)

Playing career
- 1897–1901: Johns Hopkins

Coaching career (HC unless noted)
- 1897–1901: Johns Hopkins

Head coaching record
- Overall: 25–6

Accomplishments and honors

Championships
- 3 ILA National (1898–1900)

William Harvey Maddren (August 3, 1875 – January 8, 1909) was an American lacrosse coach and physician. He served as the fourth head coach of the Johns Hopkins University lacrosse team from 1897 to 1901 during which time his teams compiled a 25–6 record and captured three national championships.

== Biography ==
The son of a doctor, Maddren was a native of Brooklyn, New York. He attended Brooklyn Polytechnic Institute, from which he received a Bachelor of Science degree in 1896.

Maddren then studied medicine at Johns Hopkins University and received a medical doctorate in 1901. Maddren played lacrosse at Hopkins from 1897 to 1901, and in his first year there, was elected team captain and appointed as its player-coach. The Intercollegiate Lacrosse Association awarded Hopkins the national championship each year from 1898 to 1900.

In May 1904, Maddren returned to Baltimore to attend a medical clinic at Johns Hopkins Hospital, and while there, also served as an assistant coach to Charles MacInnes for the game against Swarthmore College.

Alexander M. Weyand and Milton R. Roberts wrote in The Lacrosse Story that Maddren's efforts were largely responsible for "converting sedate Baltimore into a seething hotbed of lacrosse enthusiasm, the like of which had never been seen elsewhere in the United States."

Maddren died on January 8, 1909, at an age of 33. The National Lacrosse Hall of Fame inducted him in 1961.
