= Peter Kohn =

Peter Kohn was a longtime field manager at Middlebury College, Middlebury, Vermont. He worked with the Middlebury Men's Varsity Lacrosse Team and other Middlebury sport teams for several decades.

In 2004, Kohn was inducted into the Lacrosse Hall of Fame. He is one of the few people who did not play the sport to have been inducted into the Hall of Fame.

In 2005, a movie was created about Kohn, called Keeper of the Kohn.

In his later years, Kohn spent his winters in Cape May, NJ and Florida, returning to Middlebury each spring to work with the lacrosse team.

At age 77, Peter Kohn died at the University of Pennsylvania Hospital in Philadelphia, PA. Kohn was unable to recover from a heart attack, which occurred while on a fishing trip near his home in Cape May, N.J., on August 1, 2009.

== Early life ==
Kohn was born in Baltimore, Maryland to Bernard Kohn, whose family owned the Hochschild Kohn's department store chain. As a boy, Kohn struggled athletically and academically due to undiagnosed autism.

== Professional career ==
In 1954, Kohn began as a field manager at Baltimore's Park School. He moved to Middlebury becoming the manager of the men's lacrosse team from 1981-1988. He was also the equipment manager until 2003.

== Legacy ==
Before a game, Peter would rehearse his pregame speech in his hotel room. Before every game, a team member would ask him, "Hey Pete what time is it," and Peter would respond with: "It's time to beat (team in competition that day)."

== Peter Kohn Award ==
Every year an award is given to a member of the national lacrosse community who best represents the idea that "Greater love has no one than this, that he lay down his life for his friends." (John 15:13).

=== Award recipients ===
1998 – Peter Kohn

1999 – Hank Janczyk

2000 – Buddy Beardmore

2001 – Jim Darcangelo

2002 – Susan Powell

2003 – Bob Scott

2004 – Jerry Schmidt

2005 – Richie Moran

2006 – Jim Grube

2007 – Ed Britton

2008 – Dave Urick

2009 – Richie Meade

2010 – Brad Corrigan

2011 – Dr. Frederick Douglass Opie

2012 – The Colleluori Family

2013 – The Kelly Family

2014 – Steve Stenersen

2015 - Aimee Dixon

2016 - Sgt. James J. Regan and Lead the Way Foundation

2017 - Michael Jolly

2018 - Tom Hayes

2019 - Brendan Looney
