= 1984 NCAA Division I men's lacrosse tournament =

- Dates: May 16–26, 1984
- Teams: 8
- Finals site: Delaware Stadium, Newark, Delaware
- Champions: Johns Hopkins (5th title)
- Runner-up: Syracuse (2nd title game)
- Semifinalists: Army (2nd Final Four); North Carolina (5th Final Four)
- Winning coach: Don Zimmerman (1st title)
- MOP: Larry Quinn, Johns Hopkins
- Attendance: 17,671 finals 45,346 total
- Top scorer: Tim Nelson, Syracuse (11 goals)

The 1984 NCAA Division I lacrosse tournament was the 14th annual tournament hosted by the National Collegiate Athletic Association to determine the team champion of men's college lacrosse among its Division I programs, held at the end of the 1984 NCAA Division I men's lacrosse season.

Johns Hopkins defeated previously unbeaten Syracuse in the championship game, 13–10. This was the third finals where two undefeated champions met for the title and the last time this has occurred.

The championship game was played at Delaware Stadium at the University of Delaware in Newark, Delaware, with 17,253 fans in attendance.

== Overview ==
In the final, the Bluejays snapped Syracuse's 22-game winning streak, holding the Orange top offensive players, including Brad Kotz, in check. Tim Nelson was injured by his own teammate in the second quarter, and he did not play for the remainder of the game. Hopkins scored the first six goals of the contest.

Hopkins was led by goaltender Larry Quinn, attackman Brian Wood (three goals), and senior attackman Peter Scott (two goals and three assists). Hopkins compiled a perfect 14–0 mark and won its fifth NCAA title. Johns Hopkins were under the direction of first-year head coach Don Zimmerman. The Blue Jays returned to the NCAA Championship game for the eighth straight season. This would turn out to be the last undefeated season for Johns Hopkins until 2005.

This game is notable for several outstanding saves from goaltender Larry Quinn who was named the tournament outstanding player. Quinn made one of the most famous stops in NCAA lacrosse history, with Hopkins holding an 11–9 lead in the 4th quarter of the finals and Syracuse gaining momentum. On a fast break, Quinn dove across the goal to save a point blank shot by Tom Nelson. Inspired, Hopkins took control of the game from that point.

Peter Scott, considered one of the best lacrosse players to come out of the Pennsylvania school system, finished his career with four straight NCAA final appearances, made three All-American teams and is currently among the top Johns Hopkins Career Points leaders.

== Bracket ==
Quarterfinals; May 6
1	Johns Hopkins	10
8	Delaware	3
5	North Carolina	11
4	Virginia	2
3	Penn	7
6	Army	8
2	Syracuse	8^{(i)}
7	Rutgers	7

Semifinals; May 19
1	Johns Hopkins	14
5	North Carolina	9
6	Army	9
2	Syracuse	11

Championship; May 26
1	Johns Hopkins (14–0)	13
2	Syracuse (15–1)	10

- ^{(i)} one overtime

== Box scores ==
=== Finals ===
Team	1	2	3	4	Total
Johns Hopkins (14–0)	5	1	5	2	13
Syracuse (15–1)	0	2	5	3	10
Johns Hopkins scoring – Brian Wood 3, Peter Scott 2, John Tucker 2, Steve Mutscheller 2, Craig Bubier, Tom Engelke, Del Dressel, Willy Odenthal; Syracuse scoring – Tom Nelson 3, Emmett Printup 3, Dave Desko 3, Todd Curry; Shots: Johns Hopkins 49, Syracuse 33; Saves: Nims Syracuse 17, Larry Quinn Johns Hopkins 13

=== Semifinals ===
Team	1	2	3	4	Total
Johns Hopkins	4	0	5	5	14
North Carolina	3	1	4	1	9
Johns Hopkins scoring – Chris Schreiber 3, Willy Odenthal 2, Brian Wood 2, Del Dressel 2, Rich Glancy 2, Lee Davidson 2, John Tucker; North Carolina scoring – Gary Seivold 5, Steve Martel 2, Mac Ford, Terry Martinello; Shots: Johns Hopkins 55, North Carolina 39; Saves: Larry Quinn Johns Hopkins 22, Mealey North Carolina 17

Team	1	2	3	4	Total
Syracuse	3	4	2	2	11
Army	1	4	3	1	9
Syracuse scoring – Tim Nelson 4, Tom Korrie 3, Brad Kotz, Todd Curry, Tom Nelson, Eric Teschke; Army scoring – Pete Short 3, Rich Sajkoski 2, P.J. O’Sullivan, Nich Bellucci, Tim Donovan, Eric Korvin; Shots: Syracuse 38, Army 28; Saves: Syracuse 18, Army 13

=== First round ===
Team	1	2	3	4	Total
Johns Hopkins	4	3	3	0	10
Delaware	0	1	0	2	3
Johns Hopkins scoring – Willy Odenthal 2, Steve Mutscheller 2, John Tucker 2, John Krumenacker 2, Peter Scott, Tom Engelke; Delaware scoring – Pete Van Bemmel, Dennis Sepulveda, John Moeser; Shots: Johns Hopkins 50, Delaware 32; Saves: Delaware 21, Johns Hopkins 12

Team	1	2	3	4	Total
North Carolina	1	4	3	3	11
Virginia	0	0	0	2	2
North Carolina scoring – Mac Ford 2, Steve Martel 2, Joey Seivold 2, Randy Cox, Terry Martinello, James Koester, Tim Welsh, Gary Seivold; Virginia scoring – Jeff Nicklas, Roddy Marino; Shots: North Carolina 54, Virginia 30; Saves: North Carolina 15, Virginia 21

Team	1	2	3	4	Total
Army	1	1	3	3	8
Pennsylvania	1	3	2	1	7
Army scoring – Pete Short 2, Doug Shaver 2, Rob Hoynes, P.J. O’Sullivan, Chris Zupa, Mike Riccardi; Pennsylvania scoring – Leo Paytas 3, Bill Morrill, Michael Braver, Bill Schreiner, Ron Smolokoff; Shots: Pennsylvania 42, Army 21; Saves: Army 13, Pennsylvania 10

Team	1	2	3	4	OT1	Total
Syracuse	2	2	3	0	1	8
Rutgers	1	1	2	2	0	7
Syracuse scoring – Tom Korrie 2, Dave Desko 2, Tim Nelson, Todd Curry, Brad Kotz, Randy Lundblad; Rutgers scoring – Ed Trabulsy, Bill Naslonski, Brad Roos, Tim Donovan, John Crowther, Dave Disciorio, Gregg Freid; Shots: Rutgers 33, Syracuse 30; Saves: Syracuse 25, Rutgers 15

== Outstanding players ==
- Larry Quinn, Johns Hopkins (Named Tournament's Most Outstanding Player)

=== Leading scorers ===
Leading scorers	GP	G	A	Pts
Tim Nelson, Syracuse	3	5	6	11
Peter Scott, Johns Hopkins	3	3	7	10
Brian Wood, Johns Hopkins	3	5	4	9
Peter Short, Army	2	5	3	8
Del Dressel, Johns Hopkins	3	3	5	8
Willy Odenthal, Johns Hopkins	3	5	2	7
Brad Kotz, Syracuse	3	2	5	7
Gary Seivold, North Carolina	2	6	0	6
Tom Korrie, Syracuse	3	5	1	6

== Notes ==
- North Carolina's 11–2 victory over Virginia is the lowest score in tournament history.

== See also ==
- 1984 NCAA women's lacrosse tournament
- 1984 NCAA Division III lacrosse tournament
