= 1985 NCAA Division I men's lacrosse tournament =

- Dates: May 1985
- Teams: 8
- Finals site: Brown Stadium, Providence, Rhode Island
- Champions: Johns Hopkins (6th title)
- Runner-up: Syracuse (3rd title game)
- Semifinalists: North Carolina (6th Final Four); Virginia (7th Final Four)
- Winning coach: Don Zimmerman (2nd title)
- MOP: Larry Quinn, Johns Hopkins
- Attendance: 14,455 finals 35,208 total
- Top scorers: Craig Bubier, Johns Hopkins; Brian Wood, Johns Hopkins (12 goals)

The 1985 NCAA Division I lacrosse tournament was the 15th annual tournament hosted by the National Collegiate Athletic Association to determine the team champion of men's college lacrosse among its Division I programs, held at the end of the 1985 NCAA Division I men's lacrosse season.

In a re-match of the previous two years' finals, defending champions Johns Hopkins defeated Syracuse in the championship game, 11–4. Johns Hopkins finished the season with 13-1, with its lone loss coming to #13 North Carolina. This was Don Zimmerman's second straight national title as head coach.

The championship game was played at Brown Stadium at Brown University in Providence, Rhode Island with 14,455 fans in attendance.

== Summary ==
Eight Division I college men's lacrosse teams met after having played their way through a regular season, and for some, a conference tournament.

As in 1984, Larry Quinn was named Tournament Outstanding Player. Quinn and the Hopkins' defense gave up only 21 goals over this three game tournament. Hopkins' defense allowed only one goal to Syracuse for the final three plus quarters. In the regular season Hopkins did lose one close game to UNC, but their defense kept opposing teams under 10 goals in 12 of their 14 games including an early season 8–6 win over Syracuse.

This finals was notable also for being Hopkin's ninth straight appearance in the title game. The Blue Jays had five victories with four defeats in title games during this nine-year period. Hopkins would return to the NCAA finals in 1987.

== Bracket ==
Quarterfinals
1	Johns Hopkins	15
8	Adelphi	9
4	Virginia	10
5	Army	6
3	North Carolina	16
6	Brown	14
2	Syracuse	14
7	Penn	7

Semifinals
1	Johns Hopkins	11
4	Virginia	8
3	North Carolina	13
2	Syracuse	14^{(i)}

Championship
1	Johns Hopkins (13–1)	11
2	Syracuse (14–2)	4

- ^{(i)} one overtime

== Box scores ==
=== Finals ===
Team	1	2	3	4	Total
Johns Hopkins (13–1)	4	2	4	1	11
Syracuse (14–2)	3	0	1	0	4
Johns Hopkins scoring – Del Dressel 3, Craig Bubier, 2, Brian Wood 2, John Krumenacker 2, Mike Morrill, Brad McClam; Syracuse scoring – Brad Kotz, Kevin Sheenan, Fred Opie, Tom Nelson; Shots: Johns Hopkins 34, Syracuse 32; Saves: Johns Hopkins 17, Syracuse 9

=== Semifinals ===
Team	1	2	3	4	Total
Johns Hopkins	0	5	3	3	11
Virginia	5	1	1	1	8
Johns Hopkins scoring – Del Dressel 3, Craig Bubier 3, John Dressel 2, John Krumenacker, Mike Morrill, Steve Mutscheller; Virginia scoring – Roddy Marino 2, Rich Reda 2, Brad Weinman 2, Jeff Nicklas 2; Shots: Johns Hopkins 47, Virginia 27; Saves: Virginia 15, Johns Hopkins 10

Team	1	2	3	4	OT1	Total
Syracuse	4	2	4	3	1	14
North Carolina	4	5	4	0	0	13
Syracuse scoring – Rhett Cavanaugh 4, Emmett Printup 3, Tim Nelson 3, Brad Kotz, Todd Curry, Pat Donahue, John Schimoler; North Carolina scoring – Mac Ford 2, Gary Seivold 2, Tim Welsh 2, Pat Welsh 2, Joey Seivold, Greg Cox, Chris Hein, Rob Russell, Brett Davy; Shots: North Carolina 42, Syracuse 37; Saves: North Carolina 12, Syracuse 21

=== Quarterfinals ===
Team	1	2	3	4	Total
Johns Hopkins	3	4	3	5	15
Adelphi	3	3	1	2	9
Johns Hopkins scoring – Brian Wood 5, Craig Bubier 3, John Krumenacker 2, Del Dressel, John Dressel, Mike Morrill, Steve Mutscheller, Chris Schreiber; Adelphi scoring – Todd Lawson 2, Bob Quinn 2, Dave Sweeney, Joe LoCacio, Frank Tashman, Joe Bayern, Pat Badolato; Shots: Johns Hopkins 48, Adelphi 35; Saves: Adelphi 19, Johns Hopkins 13

Team	1	2	3	4	Total
Virginia	2	3	1	4	10
Army	0	2	1	3	6
Virginia scoring – Roddy Marino 4, Rich Reda 2, Chase Monroe 2, Jeff Nicklas, Todd Esposito; Army scoring – P.J. Sullivan 2, Bob Betchley, Rob Hoynes, Don Tillar, Doug Shaver; Shots: Virginia 42, Army 28; Saves: Virginia 9, Army 8

Team	1	2	3	4	Total
North Carolina	3	5	7	1	16
Brown	2	3	2	7	14
North Carolina scoring – Mac Ford 6, Joey Seivold 2, Gary Seivold 2, Steve Martel, Tim Welsh, Greg Cox, Harry McCambridge, Kevin Haus, Teddy Brown; Brown scoring – Tom Gagnon 3, Nick Mathews 3, Chris Abbot 2, John Keough 2, Steve Heffernan, Walter Cataldo, Tony Stedman, Chris Girgenti; Shots: Brown 35, North Carolina 31; Saves: Brown 13, North Carolina 13

Team	1	2	3	4	Total
Syracuse	4	2	1	7	14
Pennsylvania	0	4	1	2	7
Syracuse scoring – Brad Kotz 3, Tom Nelson 3, Todd Curry 2, John Schimoler 2, Gordie Mapes 2, Tim Nelson, Emmet Printup; Pennsylvania scoring – Leo Paytas 2, John Shoemaker, Bill Morrill, Kevin Nicklas, Bill Schreiner, Joe Gillette; Shots: Syracuse 37, Pennsylvania 20; Saves: Syracuse 11, Pennsylvania 9

== Outstanding players ==
- Larry Quinn, Johns Hopkins (Named Tournament's Most Outstanding Player)

=== Leading scorers ===
Leading scorers	GP	G	A	Pts
Craig Bubier, Johns Hopkins	3	8	4	12
Brian Wood, Johns Hopkins	3	7	5	12
Tim Nelson, Syracuse	3	4	7	11
Mac Ford, North Carolina	2	8	2	10
Brad Kotz, Syracuse	3	5	5	10
Del Dressel, Johns Hopkins	3	7	2	9
Roddy Marino, Virginia	2	6	2	8
John Krumenacker, Johns Hopkins	3	5	3	8
Rhett Cavanaugh, Syracuse	3	4	3	7

== See also ==
- 1985 NCAA Division I women's lacrosse tournament
- 1985 NCAA Division III men's lacrosse tournament
