= Penn Quakers men's lacrosse =

- Founded: 1900; 126 years ago
- University: University of Pennsylvania
- Head coach: Taylor Wray (since 2026 season)
- Stadium: Franklin Field (capacity: 52,958)
- Location: Philadelphia, Pennsylvania
- Conference: Ivy League
- Nickname: Quakers
- Colors: Red and blue

NCAA Tournament Final Fours
- (1) - 1988

NCAA Tournament Quarterfinals
- (9) – 1975, 1977, 1983, 1984, 1985, 1987, 1988, 2019, 2022

NCAA Tournament appearances
- (14) – 1975, 1977, 1983, 1984, 1985, 1987, 1988, 1989, 2004, 2006, 2011, 2014, 2019, 2022

Conference Tournament championships
- (3) - 2014, 2019, 2022

Conference regular season championships
- (5) - 1983, 1984, 1986, 1988, 2019

The Penn Quakers men's lacrosse team represents the University of Pennsylvania in National Collegiate Athletic Association (NCAA) Division I men's lacrosse. Penn competes as a member of the Ivy League and plays its home games at Franklin Field in Philadelphia.

== History ==
The Penn lacrosse program dates back to 1900 and competes on historic Franklin Field, the oldest operating football stadium in the NCAA. Penn has won the Ivy League championship in 1983, 1984, 1986, 1988 and 2019.

Penn fielded a team at the club level in 1890, but played intermittently upon starting up lacrosse, and so lists 1900 as their first official season of varsity lacrosse.

The Quakers have advanced to the NCAA tournament fourteen times. In 2014 Penn was seeded number four in the tournament, their highest seeding in over 20 years.

Penn had probably their finest season in 1988, with Chris Flynn making first team All American at midfield. Under coach Tony Seaman, the team reached the Final Four in the 1988 NCAA tournament, losing a close match to the Gait led Syracuse team, 11–10, a game in which Gary Gait performed his famous "Air Gait" goal.

In 2011, Penn went 8–7 under second-year coach Mike Murphy, defeating ranked opponents Duke and Princeton in the regular season before losing to 4th seeded Notre Dame in the NCAA tournament.

Penn has had 13 first team All Americans. Among the more notable of these players is attackman Peter Hollis, midfielder Josh Hall, and midfielder Chris Flynn who was also a prep school graduate of nearby Episcopal Academy.

Flynn made 1st and 2nd team All American in 1988 and 1987, respectively. He was also a three-time All-Ivy selection in football, a member of the 1994 U.S. National Lacrosse Team and played professionally for the Philadelphia Wings.

== Season Results ==
The following is a list of Penn's results by season as an NCAA Division I program:

Season	Coach	Overall	Conference	Standing	Postseason
Jim Adams (Ivy League) (1970–1977)
1971	Jim Adams	6–5	2–4	5th	
1972	Jim Adams	6–3	4–2	T–2nd	
1973	Jim Adams	5–4	4–2	3rd	
1974	Jim Adams	7–3	5–1	2nd	
1975	Jim Adams	7–4	5–1	2nd	NCAA Division I Quarterfinals
1976	Jim Adams	4–6	2–4	T–5th	
1977	Jim Adams	10–2	5–1	2nd	NCAA Division I Quarterfinals
Jim Adams:		51–34 (.600)	28–20 (.583)		
Charlie Coker (Ivy League) (1978–1982)
1978	Charlie Coker	3–7	1–5	T–6th	
1979	Charlie Coker	1–9	0–6	7th	
1980	Charlie Coker	5–7	2–4	T–5th	
1981	Charlie Coker	6–5	2–4	T–5th	
1982	Charlie Coker	5–8	2–4	4th	
Charlie Coker:		20–36 (.357)	7–23 (.233)		
Tony Seaman (Ivy League) (1983–1990)
1983	Tony Seaman	10–3	5–1	T–1st	NCAA Division I Quarterfinals
1984	Tony Seaman	12–2	6–0	1st	NCAA Division I Quarterfinals
1985	Tony Seaman	10–4	4–2	T–2nd	NCAA Division I Quarterfinals
1986	Tony Seaman	6–7	5–1	1st	
1987	Tony Seaman	10–5	4–2	T–2nd	NCAA Division I Quarterfinals
1988	Tony Seaman	11–4	5–1	T–1st	NCAA Division I Final Four
1989	Tony Seaman	9–5	4–2	T–2nd	NCAA Division I First Round
1990	Tony Seaman	6–7	2–4	T–5th	
Tony Seaman:		74–37 (.667)	35–13 (.729)		
G.W. Mix (Ivy League) (1991–1994)
1991	G.W. Mix	6–7	3–3	T–3rd	
1992	G.W. Mix	4–9	2–4	5th	
1993	G.W. Mix	5–9	2–4	T–5th	
1994	G.W. Mix	6–8	1–5	6th	
G.W. Mix:		21–33 (.389)	8–16 (.333)		
Terry Corcoran (Ivy League) (1995–1996)
1995	Terry Corcoran	6–8	0–6	7th	
1996	Terry Corcoran	4–10	0–6	7th	
Terry Corcoran:		10–18 (.357)	0–12 (.000)		
Marc Van Arsdale (Ivy League) (1997–2001)
1997	Marc Van Arsdale	6–6	3–3	4th	
1998	Marc Van Arsdale	4–9	1–5	T–6th	
1999	Marc Van Arsdale	6–8	2–4	T–4th	
2000	Marc Van Arsdale	5–9	1–5	6th	
2001	Marc Van Arsdale	6–7	3–3	T–3rd	
Marc Van Arsdale:		27–39 (.409)	10–20 (.333)		
Matt Hogan (Ivy League) (2002–2003)
2002	Matt Hogan	9–4	3–3	5th	
Matt Hogan:		9–4 (.692)	3–3 (.500)		
Brian Voelker (Ivy League) (2003–2009)
2003	Brian Voelker	6–7	2–4	T–4th	
2004	Brian Voelker	7–7	3–3	T–3rd	NCAA Division I First Round
2005	Brian Voelker	2–11	0–6	7th	
2006	Brian Voelker	10–4	4–2	3rd	NCAA Division I First Round
2007	Brian Voelker	6–7	3–3	T–3rd	
2008	Brian Voelker	6–7	3–3	T–4th	
2009	Brian Voelker	5–8	2–4	5th	
Brian Voelker:		42–51 (.452)	17–25 (.405)		
Mike Murphy (Ivy League) (2010–2025)
2010	Mike Murphy	5–8	1–5	7th	
2011	Mike Murphy	8–7	4–2	2nd	NCAA Division I First Round
2012	Mike Murphy	3–10	1–5	T–6th	
2013	Mike Murphy	8–5	3–3	T–3rd	
2014	Mike Murphy	11–4	4–2	3rd	NCAA Division I First Round
2015	Mike Murphy	6–7	3–3	T–4th	
2016	Mike Murphy	8–7	4–2	3rd	
2017	Mike Murphy	7–6	3–3	T–4th	
2018	Mike Murphy	7–8	3–3	T–3rd	
2019	Mike Murphy	12–4	6–0	1st	NCAA Division I Quarterfinals
2020	Mike Murphy	2–3	0–0	†	†
2021	Mike Murphy	1–0	0–0	††	††
2022	Mike Murphy	11–5	3–3	T–4th	NCAA Division I Quarterfinals
2023	Mike Murphy	7–6	4–2	T–2nd	
2024	Mike Murphy	9–6	4–2	T–2nd	
2025	Mike Murphy	4–10	1–5	6th	
Mike Murphy:		109–96 (.532)	44–40 (.524)		
Taylor Wray (Ivy League) (2026–present)
2026	Taylor Wray	7–6	3–3	T–4th	
Taylor Wray:		7–6 (.538)	3–3 (.500)		
Total:		562–668–9 (.457)			
National champion Postseason invitational champion Conference regular season champion Conference regular season and conference tournament champion Division regular season champion Division regular season and conference tournament champion Conference tournament champion

† NCAA cancelled 2020 collegiate activities due to the COVID-19 virus.
†† Ivy League cancelled 2021 collegiate season due to the COVID-19 virus.

== See also ==
- 1988 NCAA Division I Men's Lacrosse Championship
- Lacrosse in Pennsylvania
