= USILA All-American Team =

- Awarded for: the best American men's college lacrosse players at their respective positions
- Country: United States
- Presented by: USILA
- First award: 1922
- Website: usila.org

The USILA All-American Team is an honor given annually to the best American men's college lacrosse players at their respective positions by the United States Intercollegiate Lacrosse Association. The first USILA All-Americans were named in 1922, and consisted of a first team, second team, third team, and honorable mention selections. Today, separate selections are made at the NCAA Division I, Division II, and Division III levels.

Only eight players have ever been named to the USILA All-American first team all four years of their college eligibility: Doug Turnbull of Johns Hopkins (1922–25), Everett Smith of St. John's (1934–37), Frank Urso of Maryland (1973–76), Del Dressell of Johns Hopkins (1983–86), Jason Coffman of Salisbury State (1993–96), Mike Powell (2001–2004) of Syracuse, Trevor Baptiste (2015–18) of Denver, and Connor Shellenberger (2021–2024) of the University of Virginia.
