= National Lacrosse Hall of Fame and Museum =

Sports museum in Maryland, US

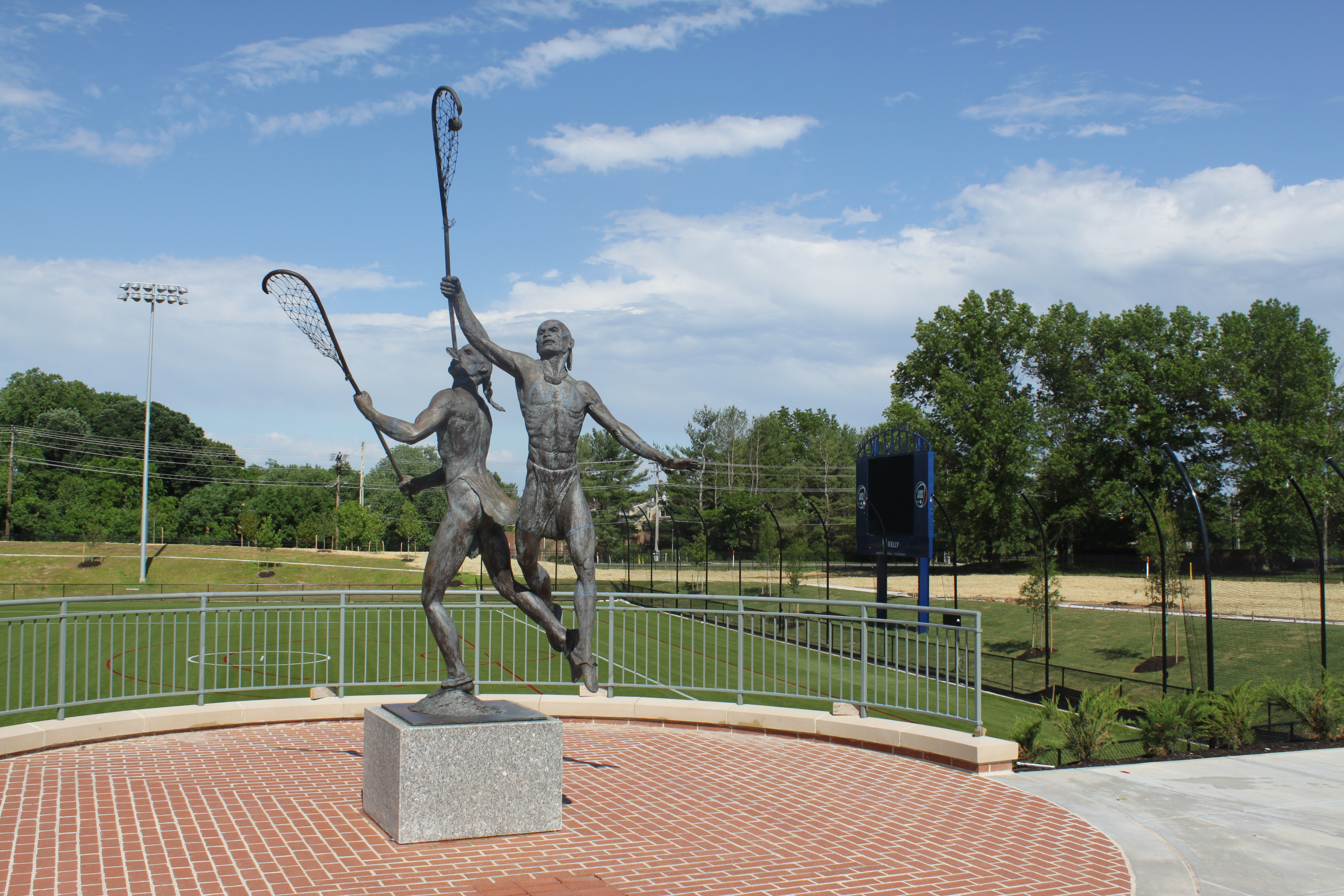
- The Creator's Game statue outside the National Lacrosse Hall of Fame and Museum

- Location within Maryland Location within the United States
- Location: 2 Loveton Circle; Sparks Glencoe, Maryland 21152
- Coordinates: 39°31′17″N 76°38′42″W
- Type: Sports museum, hall of fame
- Owner: USA Lacrosse
- Website: Official website

The National Lacrosse Hall of Fame and Museum, is located in Sparks, Maryland, at the USA Lacrosse headquarters. Prior to moving to its present location in 2016, the hall of fame and museum was located in Baltimore, Maryland, on the Homewood campus of Johns Hopkins University. The museum showcases the history of the game of lacrosse, from its Native American origins to its present-day form.

The first members of the National Lacrosse Hall of Fame were inducted in 1957. The museum displays photographs, art, vintage equipment and uniforms, trophies, as well as other memorabilia and artifacts relating to the sport of lacrosse.

== See also ==
- List of National Lacrosse Hall of Fame members
- Canadian Lacrosse Hall of Fame
- Australian Lacrosse Hall of Fame
