= List of college men's lacrosse career coaching wins leaders =

This is a list of National Collegiate Athletic Association (NCAA) men's lacrosse head coaches by number of career wins. Head coaches with a combined career record of at least 250 wins at the Division I, Division II, Division III, or historically equivalent level are included here.

== Coaches ==
- * = Active coaches.
- † = National Lacrosse Hall of Fame inductee
- Statistics current after the 2026 season.

Rank	Name	Years	Wins	Losses	Ties	Pct.	Teams
1*	Jim Berkman†	39	678	74	0	.902	Potsdam State (1985), Salisbury (1989–present)
2*	John Danowski†	44	495	230	0	.683	C.W. Post (1983–1985), Hofstra (1986–2006), Duke (2007–present)
3	Hank Janczyk	38	477	150	0	.761	Salisbury (1983–1985), Colgate (1986–1987), Gettysburg (1988–2021)
4	Bill Tierney†	39	439	152	0	.743	RIT (1982–1984), Princeton (1988–2009), Denver (2010–2023)
5	Keith Bugbee	42	432	237	0	.646	Springfield (1984–2025)
6*	J.B. Clarke	29	416	100	0	.806	Greensboro (1997), Washington (MD) (1999–2010), Limestone (2011–2021), Tampa (2022–present)
7	Bill Pilat	37	413	187	0	.688	Roanoke (1989–2025)
8	Steve Beville	35	403	176	0	.696	Colorado College (1989–1998), Vermont (1999–2006), Cortland (2007–2023)
T9^{*}	Kevin Corrigan	40	383	183	0	.677	Randolph–Macon (1985–1986), Notre Dame (1988–present)
T9^{*}	Steve Koudelka	30	383	162	0	.703	Lynchburg (1997–present)
T11	Mike Pressler	38	382	205	0	.651	VMI (1983), Ohio Wesleyan (1986–1990), Duke (1991–2006), Bryant (2007–2022)
T11^{*}	Dan Sheehan	29	382	84	0	.820	Le Moyne (1998–present)
13	Dom Starsia†	34	375	148	0	.716	Brown (1983–1992), Virginia (1993–2016)
14*	Gene Peluso	30	363	154	0	.702	Lycoming (1997–2001), RIT (2001–2010), Stevens (2010–present)
15	Jeff Long†	36	361	182	0	.665	Ithaca (1988–2023)
16	Rory Whipple	38	359	212	0	.629	Clarkson (1980–1986), Hartwick (1987–1998), Bryant (2000–2006), Florida Southern (2009–2010), Tampa (2012–2021)
17	David Urick†	34	352	132	0	.727	Hobart (1979–1989), Georgetown (1990–2012)
18^{*}	Dave Webster	35	349	192	0	.645	Marymount (1992–1998), Franklin & Marshall (1999–2001), Dickinson (2001–present)
19^{*}	John Raba	30	347	148	0	.701	Wesleyan (1997–present)
20	Ray Rostan	37	342	197	0	.635	RIT (1979–1981), Ithaca (1982–1983), Hampden–Sydney (1985–2016)
21^{*}	Stewart Moan	37	340	268	0	.559	Haverford College (1987–88), University of Lynchburg (1989–95), Marymount University (1999-01), SUNY Oneonta (2002–07), Susquehanna University (2008–present)
22	Bob Shillinglaw	42	334	320	0	.511	Massachusetts Maritime (1976–1978), Delaware (1979–2017)
23	Steve Colfer	23	329	86	0	.793	Cabrini (2001–2023)
24^{*}	Rob Randall	31	327	193	0	.629	Sacred Heart (1993–1996), SUNY Geneseo (2000), Nazareth (2001–present)
25	Jack Emmer†	36	326	184	0	.639	Cortland State (1970–1972), Washington & Lee (1973–1983), Army (1984–2005)
26	Michael Caravana	28	320	98	0	.766	Denison (1991–2005, 2008–2021)
27^{*}	Mike Mahoney	29	318	137	0	.699	St. Lawrence (1998–present)
28^{*}	John Klepacki	25	313	145	0	.683	Western New England (2002–present)
29^{*}	Jake Coon	17	310	36	0	.896	RIT (2010–present)
30^{*}	Gene McCabe	25	307	133	0	.698	Hamilton (2002–2006), Washington & Lee (2007–Present)
31	Terry Corcoran	37	301	238	0	.558	Washington (MD) (1983–1994), Penn (1995–1996), Skidmore (1997–2005), Elizabethtown (2006–2013), Wabash (2015–2016), UMass Dartmouth (2017–2020)
32	Dick Garber†	36	300	141	3	.679	UMass (1955–1990)
33	Glenn Thiel	40	299	216	0	.581	Virginia (1970–1977), Penn State (1978–2010)
34^{*}	Paul Cantabene	22	296	113	0	.724	Stevenson (2005–present)
T35^{*}	Mark Theriault	28	289	142	0	.671	Western New England (1995–1996), Keene State (1999–present)
T35	Mike Daly	26	289	134	0	.683	Tufts (1999–2016), Brown (2017–2024)
37	Walter Alessi	43	288	287	0	.501	MIT (1975–2017)
38	Roy Simmons Jr.†	28	287	96	0	.749	Syracuse (1971–1998)
39	Jim Adams†	35	284	123	1	.697	Army (1958–1969), Penn (1970–1977), Virginia (1978–1992)
40	Dick Edell†	29	282	123	0	.696	Baltimore (1973–1976), Army (1977–1983), Maryland (1984–2001)
T41	Dave Cottle	27	280	115	0	.709	Loyola (1983–2001), Maryland (2002–2010)
T41	Scott Nelson	32	280	175	0	.615	Nazareth (1985–2000), Brown (2001–2006), Marist (2008–2011), Binghamton (2011–2016), Pfeiffer (2016–2019)
43^{*}	Chris Ryan	26	276	103	0	.728	Mercyhurst (2000–2022), Mount St. Mary's (2023–present)
44	Tom Gill	36	275	232	0	.542	FDU Florham (1983–1988), Merchant Marine (1990–2021)
45^{*}	Joe Breschi	29	274	158	0	.634	Ohio State (1998–2008), North Carolina (2009–present)
46^{*}	Bill Bergen	38	273	253	0	.519	Clarkson (1988–present)
T47^{*}	Tim Boyle	26	265	112	0	.703	Dowling (2000–2016), Wingate (2016–present)
T47	John Desko	23	265	92	0	.742	Syracuse (1999–2021)
49	Tony Seaman	30	263	166	0	.613	C.W. Post (1982), Penn (1983–1990), Johns Hopkins (1991–1998), Towson (1999–2011)
50	Carl Runk	31	262	161	0	.619	Towson (1968–1998)
51	Howdy Myers†	32	261	159	4	.620	Johns Hopkins (1947–1949), Hofstra (1950–1975), Hampden–Sydney (1976–1978)
52	Richie Moran†	29	257	121	0	.680	Cornell (1969–1997)
53	Greg Cannella	31	256	181	0	.586	UMass (1994–2025)
T54	Tom Leanos	34	255	240	0	.515	Southampton (1980–1983), Drew (1988–2017)
T54^{*}	John Haus	31	255	222	0	.535	Washington College (1995–1998), Johns Hopkins (1999–2000), North Carolina (2001–2008), Lebanon Valley (2010–present)
T56^{*}	Sean Quirk	19	253	103	0	.711	Endicott (1998–2015), Springfield (2026–present)
T56	Roy Simmons Sr.†	37	253	130	1	.660	Syracuse (1931–1942, 1946–1970)
T58^{*}	Jim Nagle	32	252	210	0	.545	SUNY Oneonta (1995–2001), Colgate (2002–2011), Stony Brook (2012–2019), Connecticut College (2020–present)
T58	Renzie Lamb	35	252	184	0	.578	Williams (1989–2003)
T60	Jack Faber†	34	251	56	2	.816	Maryland (1928–1943, 1946–1963)
T60^{*}	Brandon Childs	18	251	85	0	.747	Eastern (2009–2011), York (PA) (2012–present)
62^{*}	Jim Murphy	34	250	206	0	.548	Bentley (1993–present)

== See also ==
- NCAA Division I men's lacrosse records
