= John Desko =

American lacrosse player and coach

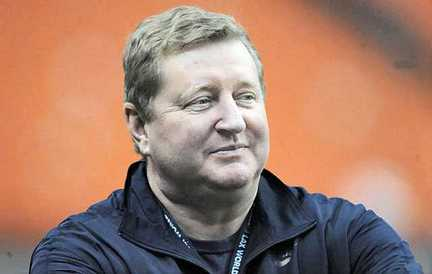
- John Desko in 2016

Current position
- Record: 265–92 (.742)

Biographical details
- Born: August 10, 1957 (age 69); Union, New York

Playing career
- 1976–1979: Syracuse
- Position: Midfielder/Defenseman

Coaching career (HC unless noted)
- 1980–1998: Syracuse (assistant)
- 1999–2021: Syracuse

Head coaching record
- Overall: 258–86 (.750)
- Tournaments: 34–15

Accomplishments and honors

Championships
- 5 NCAA Division I (2000, 2002, 2004, 2008, 2009); 4 Big East Conference (2010–2013); 2 ACC Tournament (2015, 2016); 1 ACC Regular season (2018)

Awards
- National Lacrosse Hall of Fame (2020); USILA Division I Coach of the Year (2008); 4x ACC Coach of the year (2015–2018)
Medal record
Head Coach for United States
men's national lacrosse team
World Lacrosse Championship
Silver medal – second place	2006 Ontario, Canada

John Terry Desko is a retired lacrosse head coach. Desko coached the men's lacrosse team at Syracuse University for 22 seasons from 1999 to 2021. Desko took over as head coach in 1999 from Hall of Fame coach Roy Simmons Jr.

== Early life ==
The Desko family grew up in Camillus, a suburb of Syracuse. He played high school lacrosse at West Genesee, the 15-time state champions.

== College career ==
Desko started out in the midfield but was switched to defense by assistant coach Jay Gallagher. He earned All-America honors as he helped Syracuse to a 10–5 record in 1979 and the school's first NCAA playoff berth. His two younger brothers, Dave and Jeff, were also All-American lacrosse players at Syracuse.

== As Coach ==
Simmons offered Desko an assistant job when assistant coach Jay Gallagher decided to leave Syracuse. Desko made only $1,000 a year as a coach, and waited tables in his spare time. He stayed on as an assistant for next 19 years. After taking over the top job from Roy Simmons Jr. in 1999, he became the first person outside of the Simmons family to coach Syracuse lacrosse since 1931.

Desko won five NCAA Championships as head coach and six more as an assistant coach. In his first eleven years as head coach, he coached the Syracuse lacrosse team to seven NCAA finals appearances and nine Final Fours. The most recent championship came in May 2009, when Desko led the Orange to their 10th National Championship with a 10–9 overtime comeback victory over Cornell.

Under Desko, Syracuse won 4 straight Big East championships from 2010 to 2013. After joining the ACC in 2013–14, Syracuse won back-to-back ACC Tournament championships in 2015 and 2016. Syracuse was also the regular season champion in 2018.

Desko also coached Team USA to a runner-up finish at the 2006 World Lacrosse Championship.

On June 6, 2021, Syracuse Women's Lacrosse team head coach Gary Gait was named as head coach of the Syracuse Men's Lacrosse team, replacing Desko, who retired after 22 seasons as head coach.

== Awards ==
Desko was named USILA Division I Coach of the Year for 2008 after guiding the Orange to a title over Johns Hopkins.

He was the ACC coach of the year for the fourth straight season from 2015 to 2018.

Desko was inducted into the Upstate Chapter of the US Lacrosse Hall of Fame as of 1997, Greater Syracuse Sports Hall of Fame in 2008, and the Camillus/West Genesee Hall of Fame in 2011. He was the FieldTurf Coach of the Year in 2013.

Desko was elected to the National Lacrosse Hall of Fame in May 2020. Desko is the third Syracuse head coach to be inducted into their respective sport's hall of fame after Jim Boeheim and Gary Gait.

In 2025, Desko was inducted into the IMLCA Hall of Fame along with fellow coaches; Kevin Corrigan, John Danowski, John Tillman and Mike Waldvogel.

On April 11, 2026, Desko was named to the Syracuse University Ring of Honor, which enshrined his name for permanent display inside the JMA Wireless Dome.

== Personal life ==
Desko resides in Syracuse with his wife, Cindy, and their four children; Tim (Timothy), Nicole, Casey and Ryan. Three of his four children attended Syracuse University (Nicole attended Hobart & William Smith Colleges). Tim played on the lacrosse team for 5 years, the first being a redshirt season (winning back-to-back national titles in 2008 and 2009), and has been a lacrosse coach at several colleges, including Rollins College.

== Head coaching record ==
Record table
Season	Team	Overall	Conference	Standing	Postseason
Syracuse Orangemen/Orange (NCAA independent) (1999–2009)
1999	Syracuse	12–5			NCAA Division I runner-up
2000	Syracuse	15–1			NCAA Division I champion
2001	Syracuse	13–3			NCAA Division I runner-up
2002	Syracuse	15–2			NCAA Division I champion
2003	Syracuse	10–6			NCAA Division I semifinals
2004	Syracuse	15–2			NCAA Division I champion
2005	Syracuse	7–6			NCAA Division I first round
2006	Syracuse	10–5			NCAA Division I semifinals
2007	Syracuse	5–8			
2008	Syracuse	16–2			NCAA Division I champion
2009	Syracuse	16–2			NCAA Division I champion
Syracuse Orange (Big East Conference) (2010–2013)
2010	Syracuse	13–2	6–0	1st	NCAA Division I first round
2011	Syracuse	15–2	6–0	1st	NCAA Division I quarterfinals
2012	Syracuse	9–8	3–3	T–3rd	NCAA Division I first round
2013	Syracuse	16–4	5–1	T–1st	NCAA Division I runner-up
Syracuse Orange (Atlantic Coast Conference) (2014–2021)
2014	Syracuse	11–5	2–3	T–2nd	NCAA Division I first round
2015	Syracuse	13–3	2–2	3rd	NCAA Division I quarterfinals
2016	Syracuse	12–5	2–2	T–3rd	NCAA Division I quarterfinals
2017	Syracuse	13–3	4–0	1st	NCAA Division I quarterfinals
2018	Syracuse	8–7	4–0	1st	NCAA Division I first round
2019	Syracuse	9–5	2–2	T–2nd	NCAA Division I first round
2020	Syracuse	5–0	0–0		Season canceled due to COVID-19
2021	Syracuse	7–6	2–4	T–4th	NCAA Division I first round
Syracuse:		265–93 (.740)	38–17 (.691)		
Total:		265–93 (.740)			
National champion Postseason invitational champion Conference regular season champion Conference regular season and conference tournament champion Division regular season champion Division regular season and conference tournament champion Conference tournament champion
