= Gene Corrigan =

American lacrosse player and coach (1928–2020)

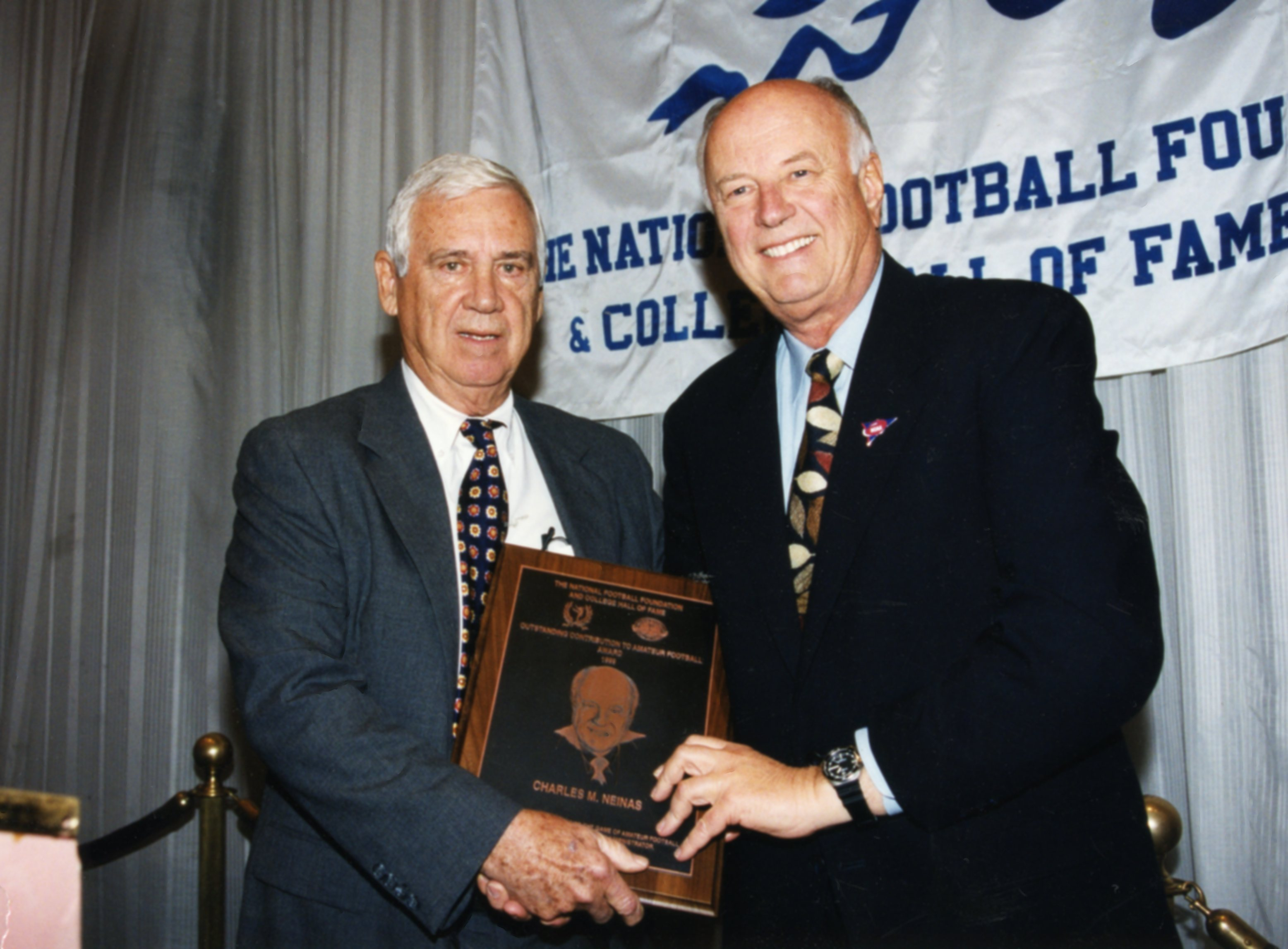
- In his role as NFF board member, Corrigan (left) presents Chuck Neinas with the NFF Outstanding Contribution to Amateur Football Award in 1999.

Biographical details
- Born: April 14, 1928; Baltimore, Maryland, U.S.
- Died: January 25, 2020 (aged 91); Charlottesville, Virginia, U.S.

Playing career

Lacrosse
- 1948–1951: Duke

Coaching career (HC unless noted)

Lacrosse
- 1956–1958: Washington and Lee
- 1959–1967: Virginia

Soccer
- 1955–1957: Washington and Lee
- 1958–1965: Virginia

Administrative career (AD unless noted)
- 1969–1971: Washington and Lee
- 1971–1981: Virginia
- 1981–1987: Notre Dame
- 1987–1995: ACC (commissioner)
- 1995–1997: NCAA (president)

Head coaching record
- Overall: 67–64 (lacrosse); 55–49–9 (soccer)

Eugene Francis Corrigan (April 14, 1928 – January 25, 2020) was an American lacrosse player, coach of lacrosse and soccer, and college athletics administrator. He served as the head men's lacrosse coach at Washington and Lee University from 1956 to 1958 and at the University of Virginia from 1959 to 1967, compiling a career college lacrosse record of 67–64. Corrigan was also the head men's soccer coach at Washington and Lee from 1955 to 1957 and at Virginia from 1958 to 1965, tallying a career college soccer mark of 55–49–9. Corrigan was the athletic director at the University of Virginia from 1971 to 1981 and the University of Notre Dame from 1981 to 1987. He served as the commissioner of the Atlantic Coast Conference (ACC) from 1987 to 1995 and president of the National Collegiate Athletic Association (NCAA) from 1995 to 1997.

Corrigan was inducted into the National Lacrosse Hall of Fame in 1993, the Virginia Sports Hall of Fame in 2007 and the North Carolina Sports Hall of Fame in 2019. In 1996, he was a Gold Medal Recipient from the National Football Foundation.

Corrigan graduated in 1946 from Loyola High School in Baltimore. Upon graduation, he served in the United States Army for 18 months. Corrigan was the father of Boo Corrigan, athletic director at North Carolina State University; Kevin Corrigan, head men's lacrosse coach at the University of Notre Dame; and Tim Corrigan, senior coordinating producer for the NBA on ESPN. Women's Basketball Hall of Fame coach Debbie Ryan was his niece.

Corrigan died on January 25, 2020, at the age of 91 in Charlottesville, Virginia.
