= Duke–North Carolina lacrosse rivalry =

College sports rivalry

- Duke Blue Devils North Carolina Tar Heels
- First meeting: May 11, 1952; Duke 12, North Carolina 4
- Latest meeting: April 25, 2026; Duke 16, North Carolina 12

Statistics
- Total meetings: 84
- All-time series: North Carolina leads, 45–39
- Largest victory: North Carolina, 24–4 (1976)
- Longest win streak: North Carolina, 19 (1968–1986)
- Current win streak: Duke, 2 (2025–present)

The Duke–North Carolina lacrosse rivalry is an intercollegiate lacrosse rivalry between the Duke Blue Devils and the North Carolina Tar Heels. Located just 9.8 miles apart on Tobacco Road, the two programs are classic rivals in the Atlantic Coast Conference, headlined by their basketball and football rivalries, but also extending to lacrosse - even club lacrosse. The rivalry has carried national importance itself since the 1990s, leading to numerous thrilling contests between the two in the ACC and NCAA postseason tournaments. Duke leads the ACC series 9–4 and has compiled a perfect 4–0 mark against the heels in NCAA tournament play. Current Heels coach Joe Breschi summed up the rivalry as "when you’re 12 miles away from a school that you don’t like and doesn’t like you, it makes it more intense. There’s so much more meaning there than any other game. That’s what makes winning that much more sweet." In 2019, his counterpart Duke head coach John Danowski described the annual challenge of facing UNC: "They're really good. They're very well-coached, they get the best players in the country year after year, they have the top recruiting classes, and they hate Duke." As a testament to the national success between the two schools, the Blue Devils have won three national titles (2010, 2013, 2014), while the Tar Heels lay claim to five (1981, 1982, 1986, 1991, 2016). As of the end of the 2025 season, North Carolina leads the series 45–38.

== Series history ==
=== Carolina dominance (1950s to 1995) ===
The series first began in Durham in 1952, with Duke emerging victorious as a four-goal winner. The Atlantic Coast Conference began sponsoring men's lacrosse two years later and Duke would again prevail in a 15–1 rout. That season, the Blue Devils would capture the inaugural ACC crown. However, despite the series becoming a conference matchup, the teams would not meet again until 1964, as North Carolina shutout Duke 14–0. After another hiatus in 1966, Duke would take the following season's game and since that date the rivalry has been played annually. Traditionally, the programs have been the southernmost programs playing collegiate lacrosse. As a result, they were at a recruiting disadvantage for much of the 20th century due to the long distances from recruiting hotbeds and other schools. NC State had a program for ten years in the 1970s and 1980s, but the ACC schools were the only Division I members in North Carolina for decades. This contributed to the importance of the annual series in the eyes of supporters and sparse southern recruiting.

With this context, the present national powers struggled for much of their early existence against established programs like Maryland and Virginia. The Tar Heels would build momentum in the 1970s, appearing in their first NCAA tournament in 1976, their first Final Four in 1980, and claiming their first national title in 1981. Duke struggled during this same period, at one point going winless in conference play for 10 straight years, compiling an 0–35 mark. The Blue Devils did not fare much better against a newly dominant Tar Heels program. North Carolina won a series-record 19 consecutive victories, spanning the late 1960s, entire decade of the 1970s, and the mid-1980s. The last Carolina triumph in this streak was an overtime victory in 1986 before Duke ended the drought with a one-goal win the next year. However, after this rare loss, Carolina would take the next 11 meetings, with only two games decided by three or fewer goals. Mike Pressler would change the course of the rivalry and launch Duke's current status as a national power. After losing his first seven matchups, Pressler's Blue Devils downed UNC in a 14–6 display in the 1995 ACC tournament. Duke would earn the league tournament title and proceed to its third-ever NCAA postseason appearance. However, Duke had yet to advance past the quarterfinals on the national stage.

=== Recent history (1995 to present) ===
That 1995 meeting would mark the turning point in the rivalry, as the Blue Devils won eight of the next ten games. On the national stage, Duke would reach the Final Four in 1997 before the rivals met for their first NCAA postseason meeting the next year. #7 Duke downed the Heels 16–14 before falling in the quarters to eventual national champion Princeton. After the '98 season, Carolina would experience a downturn as the Blue Devils took the reign as the predominant team in the South. Coupled with a coaching change, UNC made just two tournament appearances between 1999 and 2006 shortly after their streak of 17 consecutive appearances had ended in 1996.

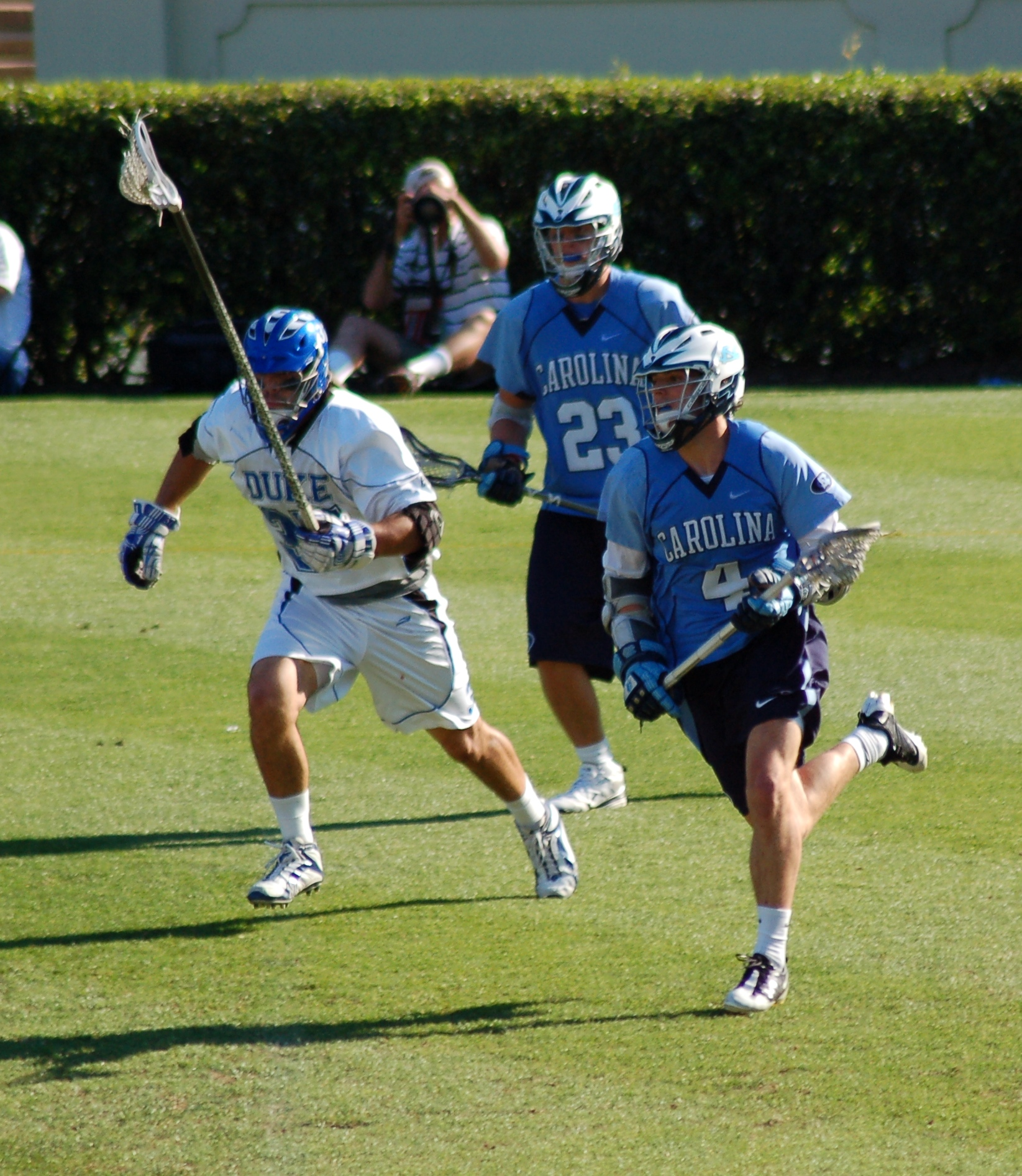
UNC and Duke competing in the 2009 ACC tournament championship game

Carolina would take three straight meetings from 2002 to 2004, but Duke would engineer in a season sweep in its 2005 national runner-up season. That sweep would portend further dominance from the Blue Devils, as they defeated UNC 11 straight times. This period often included rematches in the ACC tournament and twice during the NCAA postseason. In 2007, Duke advanced to the Final Four by defeating the Heels for the third time that season, pulling away from Carolina by a score of 19 to 11. Two seasons later, Duke again defeated UNC in the quarters in a closer affair. Prior to that postseason game, senior defenseman Ryan McFadyen described the stakes of the rivalry: There's nothing like it. No other rivalry, even Maryland or UVA, is the same. It's going to be a hard-fought game and guys are going battle back and forth with each other the whole time. There's even going to be some dirty play. There's bad blood between these two teams, for sure." The two had met in the ACC championship and would be a close game. In the fourth quarter, the Heels rallied from a four-goal deficit to cut Duke's lead to one, but a Sean Delaney shot missed high as time expired to seal another Blue Devils victory. After UNC took the 2010 regular season matchup, Duke routed UNC, spurred by a six-goal run in the second half, en route to its first-ever national championship in lacrosse. This victory was Duke's third in the quarterfinals over the Heels in just four seasons, improving their overall NCAA postseason Tobacco Road record to a perfect 4–0.

The last decade has seen an increasingly competitive series between the two schools. Of the previous eight meetings, four went to Duke and four went to North Carolina. Furthermore, the teams combined for four national titles (2010, 2013, 2014, 2016) and eight Final Four appearances during the period. From 2007 to 2015, 12 of the 16 games played between the two schools occurred when both were ranked inside the USILA Top 10. Two recent games, both UNC victories, were particularly notable affairs. In the 2013 ACC tournament, the Heels prevailed 18–17, combining for 35 goals, the second-most in the series, only trailing a 39-goal game in 1990. After the Blue Devils nearly completed a nine-goal comeback, the game also made ACC tournament history, with the most total goals scored, while Duke's Jordan Wolf and his seven points were one shy of tying the individual point record in the tournament. Another shootout occurred in 2016, with UNC beating Duke by a score of 17–16 in sudden death overtime to preserve their postseason hopes. Senior midfielder Patrick Kelly secured the victory with just over two minutes remaining in overtime after Duke had scored a tying goal in regulation with only eight seconds to go. That victory propelled the Heels to the NCAA tournament and their run to the national title.

After a one-year hiatus due to the COVID-19 pandemic cancellations, the teams met as No. 1 and No. 2 in 2021 with undefeated records at the line (9–0 for Duke; 8–0 for UNC). Top-ranked Duke scored the game-winner by way of attackman Joe Robertson after the game headed to overtime knotted at 11.

== Rival accomplishments ==
The following summarizes the accomplishments of the two programs.

| Team | Duke Blue Devils | North Carolina Tar Heels |
|---|---|---|
| Pre-NCAA National Titles | 0 | 0 |
| NCAA National Titles | 3 | 5 |
| NCAA Final Four Appearances | 12 | 13 |
| NCAA Tournament Appearances | 23 | 32 |
| NCAA Tournament Record | 37–20 | 33–27 |
| Conference Tournament Titles | 7 | 9 |
| Conference Championships | 13 | 12 |
| Tewaarton Award Recipients | 2 | 0 |
| Lt. Raymond Enners Award Recipients | 2 | 3 |
| Consensus First Team All-Americans | 40 | 39 |
| All-time Program Record | 588–424–1 | 509–310–2 |
| All-time Winning Percentage | .581 | .621 |

== Game results ==
Rankings are incomplete (Duke accurate from 1993 to present; North Carolina accurate from 1999 to present).

| Duke victories | North Carolina victories | Tie games |

| No. | Date | Location | Winner | Score |
|---|---|---|---|---|
| 1 | 1952 | Durham, NC | Duke | 11–7 |
| 2 | 1953 | Durham, NC | Duke | 13–4 |
| 3 | 1954 | Durham, NC | Duke | 15–1 |
| 4 | 1964 | Durham, NC | North Carolina | 14–0 |
| 5 | 1965 | Chapel Hill, NC | North Carolina | 14–7 |
| 6 | 1967 | Durham, NC | Duke | 12–6 |
| 7 | 1968 | Chapel Hill, NC | North Carolina | 13–7 |
| 8 | 1969 | Durham, NC | North Carolina | 12–10 |
| 9 | 1970 | Chapel Hill, NC | North Carolina | 20–5 |
| 10 | 1971 | Durham, NC | North Carolina | 7–4 |
| 11 | 1972 | Chapel Hill, NC | North Carolina | 15–7 |
| 12 | 1973 | Durham, NC | North Carolina | 11–10 |
| 13 | 1974 | Chapel Hill, NC | North Carolina | 17–15 |
| 14 | 1975 | Durham, NC | North Carolina | 13–5 |
| 15 | 1976 | Chapel Hill, NC | North Carolina | 24–4 |
| 16 | 1977 | Durham, NC | North Carolina | 12–7 |
| 17 | 1978 | Chapel Hill, NC | North Carolina | 17–10 |
| 18 | 1979 | Durham, NC | North Carolina | 10–4 |
| 19 | 1980 | Chapel Hill, NC | North Carolina | 10–6 |
| 20 | 1981 | Durham, NC | North Carolina | 22–5 |
| 21 | 1982 | Chapel Hill, NC | North Carolina | 18–5 |
| 22 | 1983 | Durham, NC | North Carolina | 19–5 |
| 23 | 1984 | Chapel Hill, NC | North Carolina | 18–4 |
| 24 | 1985 | Durham, NC | North Carolina | 11–9 |
| 25 | 1986 | Chapel Hill, NC | North Carolina | 9–8^{OT} |
| 26 | 1987 | Durham, NC | Duke | 10–9 |
| 27 | 1988 | Chapel Hill, NC | North Carolina | 18–9 |
| 28 | 1989 | Durham, NC | North Carolina | 14–8 |
| 29 | 1989 | Chapel Hill, NC | North Carolina | 18–6 |

| No. | Date | Location | Winner | Score |
|---|---|---|---|---|
| 30 | 1990 | Chapel Hill, NC | North Carolina | 26–13 |
| 31 | 1991 | Durham, NC | North Carolina | 15–6 |
| 32 | 1991 | Durham, NC | North Carolina | 11–8 |
| 33 | 1992 | Chapel Hill, NC | North Carolina | 9–8 |
| 34 | 1993 | Durham, NC | North Carolina | 13–9 |
| 35 | 1993 | Chapel Hill, NC | North Carolina | 13–6 |
| 36 | 1994 | Chapel Hill, NC | North Carolina | 23–9 |
| 37 | 1995 | Durham, NC | North Carolina | 13–8 |
| 38 | 1995 | Chapel Hill, NC | #7 Duke | 14–6 |
| 39 | 1996 | Chapel Hill, NC | #9 Duke | 11–10 |
| 40 | 1996 | Charlottesville, VA | North Carolina | 18–8 |
| 41 | 1997 | Durham, NC | #11 Duke | 8–7 |
| 42 | 1998 | Chapel Hill, NC | #7 Duke | 13–9 |
| 43 | 1998 | Amherst, MA | #7 Duke | 16–14 |
| 44 | 1999 | Durham, NC | #15 North Carolina | 10–9 |
| 45 | 1999 | Chapel Hill, NC | #3 Duke | 9–7 |
| 46 | 2000 | Durham, NC | #9 Duke | 13–8 |
| 47 | 2001 | Chapel Hill, NC | #10 Duke | 11–8 |
| 48 | 2001 | Orlando, FL | #12 Duke | 11–9 |
| 49 | 2002 | Durham, NC | #9 North Carolina | 9–7 |
| 50 | 2003 | Chapel Hill, NC | #13 North Carolina | 14–9 |
| 51 | 2004 | Durham, NC | #8 North Carolina | 10–9^{OT} |
| 52 | 2005 | Chapel Hill, NC | #3 Duke | 12–10 |
| 53 | 2005 | Baltimore, MD | #2 Duke | 13–11 |
| 54 | 2006 | Durham, NC | #3 Duke | 11–8 |
| 55 | 2007 | Chapel Hill, NC | #5 Duke | 9–7 |
| 56 | 2007 | Durham, NC | #2 Duke | 13–9 |
| 57 | 2007 | Annapolis, MD | #2 Duke | 19–11 |
| 58 | 2008 | Durham, NC | #1 Duke | 19–9 |

| No. | Date | Location | Winner | Score |
|---|---|---|---|---|
| 59 | 2008 | Charlottesville, VA | #2 Duke | 17–6 |
| 60 | 2009 | Chapel Hill, NC | #9 Duke | 12–8 |
| 61 | 2009 | Chapel Hill, NC | #6 Duke | 15–13 |
| 62 | 2009 | Annapolis, MD | #3 Duke | 12–11 |
| 63 | 2010 | Durham, NC | #4 North Carolina | 13–7 |
| 64 | 2010 | Princeton, NJ | #5 Duke | 17–9 |
| 65 | 2011 | Chapel Hill, NC | #7 Duke | 14–9 |
| 66 | 2012 | Durham, NC | #14 Duke | 13–11 |
| 67 | 2012 | Charlottesville, VA | #7 Duke | 12–9 |
| 68 | 2013 | Chapel Hill, NC | #17 Duke | 11–8 |
| 69 | 2013 | Chapel Hill, NC | #3 North Carolina | 18–17 |
| 70 | 2014 | Durham, NC | #4 Duke | 9–8^{OT} |
| 71 | 2015 | Chapel Hill, NC | #4 North Carolina | 15–14 |
| 72 | 2016 | Durham, NC | #15 North Carolina | 17–16^{OT} |
| 73 | 2017 | Chapel Hill, NC | #11 Duke | 12–8 |
| 74 | 2018 | Durham, NC | #5 Duke | 11–10 |
| 75 | 2019 | Chapel Hill, NC | North Carolina | 10–8 |
| 76 | 2021 | Durham, NC | #1 Duke | 12–11^{OT} |
| 77 | 2021 | Chapel Hill, NC | #3 North Carolina | 15–12 |
| 78 | 2022 | Chapel Hill, NC | #15 Duke | 15–6 |
| 79 | 2022 | Durham, NC | #9 Duke | 19–11 |
| 80 | 2023 | Durham, NC | #4 Duke | 15–8 |
| 81 | 2024 | Chapel Hill, NC | North Carolina | 15–12 |
| 82 | 2025 | Durham, NC | #7 North Carolina | 8–7 |
| 83 | 2025 | Charlotte, NC | #9 Duke | 14–7 |
| 84 | 2026 | Chapel Hill, NC | #17 Duke | 16–12 |
Series: North Carolina leads 45–39
