= John Danowski =

American lacrosse coach (born 1954)

Current position
- Title: Head coach
- Team: Duke University
- Record: 495–230

Biographical details
- Born: March 12, 1954 (age 72); Bronxville, New York

Playing career
- 1973–1976: Rutgers

Coaching career (HC unless noted)
- 1982: C.W. Post (asst.)
- 1983–1985: C.W. Post
- 1986–2006: Hofstra
- 2007–present: Duke

Accomplishments and honors

Championships
- 3 NCAA Division I (2010, 2013, 2014)

Awards
- 3× F. Morris Touchstone Award (1993, 2010, 2013)

John Danowski (born March 12, 1954) is an American college lacrosse coach who has been the head coach of the Duke Blue Devils men's lacrosse team since the 2007 season. Previously, he had spent 21 seasons as the head coach at Hofstra. Danowski coached Duke to the National Collegiate Athletic Association (NCAA) Men's Lacrosse Championship in 2010, 2013, and 2014, and appearances in the national championship game in 2007, 2018, and 2023. He is a three-time winner of the F. Morris Touchstone Award as the NCAA men's lacrosse coach of the year, earning the honor in 1993, 2010, and 2013. One of nine coaches to lead three NCAA Division I championship teams, Danowski has won more games than any other Division I lacrosse coach. In addition, he is the head coach of the United States men's national lacrosse team, which he led to the gold medal at the 2018 World Lacrosse Championship.

== Early life and college ==
Born in Bronxville, New York, Danowski attended East Meadow High School and played lacrosse from 1969 to 1972, helping his team win the county championship twice. He went to Rutgers University and played for the school's men's lacrosse team for four seasons, from 1973 to 1976. He led the team in assists three times and, as of 2011, is Rutgers' record-holder for assists in a season, having assisted on 54 goals during the 1973 season. That year, Danowski also set the team record with 13 assists in a game against Penn State, and in 1974 he compiled a school-record 14 points in a game. Danowski graduated from Rutgers in 1976, and gained a master's degree in 1978 at C.W. Post.

== Coaching career ==
=== C.W. Post ===
In 1982, C.W. Post hired Danowski as an assistant coach for its men's lacrosse team, under Tony Seaman. The following year, he was promoted to head coach. Danowski spent three seasons as head coach for C.W. Post, compiling a 27–16 win–loss record.

=== Hofstra ===
Danowski became the head coach at Hofstra before the 1986 season. In the year before Danowski joined the school, the team had a 3–11 record. Hofstra improved under Danowski, and by 1988 the team had reached the top 15 in national polls. That year, Hofstra earned the East Coast Conference championship, and added another in 1989. In 1993, Hofstra reached the NCAA Tournament for the first time in 15 seasons, defeating three teams ranked in the top 10 during the season. Hofstra won its first-ever NCAA Tournament game before losing to Syracuse in the quarterfinals. Danowski was honored as coach of the year in the NCAA's Division I.

The 2006 season was Danowski's last coaching at Hofstra. The team went on a 17-game winning streak, tying the record for most wins by an NCAA men's lacrosse team in a season. Hofstra achieved a national ranking of number two, but was unable to advance past the quarterfinals of that year's NCAA Tournament. In his 21 years with Hofstra, Danowski's teams were 192–123, appeared in the NCAA Tournament eight times, and won as many conference titles.

=== Duke ===
==== 2007–2013 ====
In 2006, as the Duke lacrosse case played out, the university's head coach, Mike Pressler, was forced to resign after being in the position for 16 seasons. The team was suspended from competition by Duke's president, but in June 2006 the suspension was lifted. The following month, Duke hired Danowski to fill its vacancy at head coach. The first season for Danowski at Duke saw him lead the team to a 17-win season, the fourth in NCAA men's lacrosse history. Duke reached the championship game in the 2007 NCAA Tournament, losing 12–11 to Johns Hopkins. Danowski won the Atlantic Coast Conference Coach of the Year award. In 2008, Duke entered the NCAA Tournament as the top-seeded team, only to lose again to Johns Hopkins, this time in the national semifinals. Duke lost again in the semifinals of the 2009 NCAA Tournament, falling to Syracuse 17–7.

Danowski won his first national championship as a head coach in the 2010 season, his fourth at Duke, in which the team posted a record of 16–4. In the title game, Duke defeated Notre Dame in overtime, scoring the winning goal five seconds after the start of the extra period. The championship was the first for Duke in men's lacrosse. Following the season, Danowski again was named Division I Coach of the Year. Danowski's Duke team again reached the semifinals of the 2011 NCAA Tournament, but lost in that round against Maryland. Inside Lacrosse's Geoff Shannon described Danowski's 2011 performance as among "his most impressive yet in terms of pure coaching acumen", as his team was relatively inexperienced and he opted to make two freshmen starters early in the year. Danowski interviewed with Rutgers for that school's head coaching position after the season, but decided to remain with the Blue Devils.

With a Duke victory in the first game of the 2012 season, Danowski earned his 300th win. Duke made it to the 2012 NCAA Tournament semifinals before losing to Maryland 16–10. In 2013, Duke began the season by losing four of its first six games, but posted a 14–1 record afterwards. The Blue Devils made the semifinals of the NCAA Tournament for the seventh straight year, and a 16–14 victory over Cornell gave them a spot in the national championship game. Duke won its second national championship by defeating Syracuse 16–10 in the title game, held in Philadelphia. The Blue Devils finished the season with a 16–5 record, and Danowski was named the Division I coach of the year for the third time.

==== 2014–present ====
The 2014 Blue Devils went 17–3 and reached the program's eighth consecutive NCAA Tournament Final Four and fourth national championship game during Danowski's tenure as coach. After earlier NCAA Tournament victories over Air Force and Johns Hopkins, Duke faced Notre Dame for the championship. With an 11–9 Duke win, Danowski earned his third NCAA Division I championship, becoming the ninth coach to achieve this feat. In addition, he became the eighth coach to lead a team to consecutive NCAA Division I men's lacrosse titles. The Blue Devils' attempt to win a third straight national title ended in the first round of the 2015 NCAA Tournament, as Ohio State defeated the fifth-seeded Duke team 16–11. The 2016 Blue Devils advanced no farther in the NCAA Tournament that the previous year's team, falling to Loyola in the opening round.

A 13–6 Duke win over Jacksonville on March 13, 2017, was the 376th of Danowski's head coaching career, breaking the Division I record which had previously been held by former Brown and Virginia coach Dom Starsia. The Blue Devils again reached the NCAA Tournament and advanced to the quarterfinals before a 16–11 defeat against Ohio State. Duke ended the 2017 season with a 13–5 record.

In 2018, Danowski's Duke team again participated in the NCAA Tournament, earning the fourth seed. With a win over Maryland, the Blue Devils reached their first NCAA championship game in four years, ultimately losing 13–11 to Yale. At the end of the season, Danowski stood one win shy of 400 for his career. He signed a new contract with Duke that goes through 2023. The 400th victory for Danowski as a head coach came in the first game of the 2019 season against Furman, making him the third NCAA men's lacrosse coach, and first in Division I, with that many wins. The 2019 Blue Devils were the number two seed in the NCAA Tournament and made it to the semifinals for the 10th time in 13 seasons, where they faced Virginia. Duke lost a two-goal lead in the last minute, and a 13–12 defeat in double overtime left the team one win short of a second straight NCAA title game.

Duke began 2020 by winning six of their first eight games, before the rest of the season was canceled because of the COVID-19 pandemic. In 2021, Duke made another NCAA Tournament as the second seed, reaching the semifinals before falling 14–5 to Maryland. Duke did not qualify for the NCAA Tournament in 2022. The program returned to the event in 2023 as the number one seed, defeating Penn State 16–15 in overtime to reach the national championship game. There, the Blue Devils were defeated 13–9 by Notre Dame, which concluded a 16–3 season. Duke went 13–6 in the 2024 season and was eliminated by Maryland in their second NCAA Tournament game.

Danowski was inducted into the National Polish-American Sports Hall of Fame on June 16, 2022. In 2024, Duke inducted Danowski into its athletics hall of fame.

In 2025, the Blue Devils advanced to the ACC Tournament championship, but were eliminated in the first round of the NCAA Tournament by Georgetown to finish 12-6. In 2026, Duke failed to make the ACC Tournament for the first time in Danowski's tenure, but was selected to the NCAA Tournament and advanced to the final four. On September 3, 2026, Duke announced Danowski would receive a contract extension through the 2029 season.

=== United States men's national team ===
In 2015, Danowski was selected by US Lacrosse to coach the U.S. men's national team at the 2018 World Lacrosse Championship. The U.S. went undefeated in its seven games at the tournament, facing Canada in the gold medal match. A goal with one second remaining by Tom Schreiber proved the margin of victory in a 9–8 win that gave Danowski's U.S. team the world championship. US Lacrosse announced in November 2018 that Danowski would coach at the upcoming World Lacrosse Championship, which would make him the first coach to lead the U.S. men's team in multiple world championships.

== Family ==
Danowski is married and has two children. His father was Ed Danowski, a National Football League quarterback for the New York Giants. One of his sons is former Duke lacrosse player Matt Danowski, who was named to the USILA All-American first team three times and is an assistant coach for the Blue Devils. When Danowski accepted the head coaching position at Duke, Matt was playing for the school. Later, Matt was a captain on Danowski's 2018 World Lacrosse Championship squad.

== See also ==
- List of college men's lacrosse career coaching wins leaders
