= F. Morris Touchstone Award =

American collegiate lacrosse award

The F. Morris Touchstone Award is an award given by the United States Intercollegiate Lacrosse Association to the nation's most outstanding NCAA Division I lacrosse head coach. The award was first presented in 1958.

The award is named after F. Morris Touchstone who was head coach at the United States Military Academy from 1928 to 1957. His teams had a record of 214-73-4. Of his 82 first-team All-Americans, 42 played under Touchstone. and won the national championship in 1944, 1945 (co-winner with Navy), and 1951 (co-winner with Princeton). Touchstone was inducted in the U.S. Lacrosse Hall of Fame in 1960.

== Award winners ==
Year	Coach	School
1958	Albert Twitchell	Rutgers
1959	John Faber	Maryland
1960	Willis Bilderback	Navy
1961	James Adams	Army
1962	J. Bruce Munro	Harvard
1963	Rix Yard	Denison
1964	A. Barr Snively	New Hampshire
1965	Robert Scott	Johns Hopkins
1966	Donaldson Kelly	Washington College
1967	Ferris Thomsen	Princeton
1968	Robert Scott	Johns Hopkins
1969	Avery Blake	Pennsylvania
1970	Howard Myers Jr.	Hofstra
1971	Richard M. Moran	Cornell
1972	Robert Scott	Johns Hopkins
1973	Clayton Beardmore	Maryland
1974	Jack Emmer	Washington & Lee
1975	Richard Szlasa	Navy
1976	Dick Garber	Massachusetts
1977	Richard M. Moran	Cornell
1978	Dick Edell	Army
1979	Bob Shillinglaw	Delaware
1980	Roy Simmons	Syracuse
1981	William Scroggs	North Carolina
1982	Paul Doherty	Adelphi
1983	Tony Seaman	Pennsylvania
1984	Tony Seaman	Pennsylvania
1985	Dom Starsia	Brown
1986	Bryan Matthews	Navy
1987	Richard M. Moran	Cornell
1988	Dave Cottle	Loyola
1989	Dick Garber	Massachusetts
1990	Mike Waldvogel	Yale
1991	Dom Starsia	Brown
1992	Bill Tierney	Princeton
1993	John Danowski	Hofstra
1994	Peter Lasagna	Brown
1995	Dick Edell	Maryland
1996	Sid Jamieson	Bucknell
1997	Jack McGetrick	Hartford
1998	Jon Hind	Butler
1999	Bob Shillinglaw	Delaware
2000	Dave Pietramala	Cornell
2001	Tony Seaman	Towson
2002	Dave Pietramala	Johns Hopkins
2003	Jim Stagnitta	Rutgers
2004	Richie Meade	Navy
2005	Mike Pressler	Duke
2006	Greg Cannella	Massachusetts
2007	Scott Marr	Albany
2008	John Desko	Syracuse
2009	Jeff Tambroni	Cornell
2010	John Danowski	Duke
2011	Dom Starsia	Virginia
2012	Charley Toomey	Loyola
2013	John Danowski	Duke
2014	Eric Seremet	Air Force
2015	Bill Tierney	Denver
2016	Joe Breschi	North Carolina
2017	Shawn Nadelen	Towson
2018	Andy Shay	Yale
2019	Mike Murphy	Pennsylvania
2020	no award	(Season canceled due to COVID-19 Pandemic)
2021	Kevin Warne	Georgetown
2022	John Tillman	Maryland
2023	Kevin Corrigan	Notre Dame
2024	Kevin Corrigan	Notre Dame
2025	Connor Buczek	Cornell
2026	Matt Madalon	Princeton

=== By individual ===
Rank	Name	Number of Awards	Winning years
1-T	Richard M. Moran	3	1971, 1977, 1987
1-T	Robert Scott	3	1965, 1968, 1972
1-T	Tony Seaman	3	1983, 1984, 2001
1-T	Dom Starsia	3	1985, 1991, 2011
1-T	John Danowski	3	1993, 2010, 2013
6-T	Dick Edell	2	1978, 1995
6-T	Dick Garber	2	1976, 1989
6-T	Dave Pietramala	2	2000, 2002
6-T	Bob Shillinglaw	2	1979, 1999
6-T	Bill Tierney	2	1992, 2015
6-T	Kevin Corrigan	2	2023, 2024
12-T	Multiple winners tied with 1		

=== By University ===
Rank	School	Number of Awards	Winning years
1	Cornell	6	1971, 1977, 1987, 2000, 2009, 2025
2-T	Johns Hopkins	4	1965, 1968, 1972, 2002
2-T	Navy	4	1960, 1975, 1986, 2004
2-T	Pennsylvania	4	1969, 1983, 1984, 2019
2-T	Maryland	4	1959, 1973, 1995, 2022
6-T	Brown	3	1985, 1991, 1994
6-T	Massachusetts	3	1976, 1989, 2006
6-T	Duke	3	2005, 2010, 2013
6-T	Princeton	3	1967, 1992, 2026
10-T	Army	2	1961, 1978
10-T	Delaware	2	1979, 1999
10-T	Hofstra	2	1970, 1993
10-T	Syracuse	2	1980, 2008
10-T	Rutgers	2	1958, 2003
10-T	Loyola	2	1998, 2012
10-T	North Carolina	2	1981, 2016
10-T	Towson	2	2001, 2017
10-T	Yale	2	1990, 2018
10-T	Notre Dame	2	2023, 2024
20-T	Multiple winners tied with 1		
