= Jim Adams (lacrosse) =

American lacrosse coach (1928–2019)

Biographical details
- Born: April 10, 1928; Baltimore, Maryland, U.S.
- Died: November 10, 2019 (aged 91); Charlottesville, Virginia, U.S.

Playing career
- 1947–1950: Johns Hopkins
- 1951–1956: Mount Washington L.C.
- Position: Midfielder

Coaching career (HC unless noted)
- 1951–1953: St. Paul's School
- 1957: Mount Washington L.C.
- 1958–1969: Army
- 1970–1977: Pennsylvania
- 1978–1992: Virginia

Head coaching record
- Overall: 284–123–1

Accomplishments and honors

Championships
- 1958 USILA National Championship; 1959 USILA National Co-Championship; 1961 USILA National Co-Championship; 1969 USILA National Co-Championship; 1980 Atlantic Coast Conference Championship; 1983 Atlantic Coast Conference Championship; 1984 Atlantic Coast Conference Championship; 1985 Atlantic Coast Conference Championship; 1986 Atlantic Coast Conference Championship; 1990 Atlantic Coast Conference Championship

Awards
- 1961 USILA Coach of the Year

James Frederick "Ace" Adams IV (April 10, 1928 – November 10, 2019) was an American lacrosse coach. He served as the head coach at the United States Military Academy, University of Pennsylvania, and University of Virginia. He was inducted into the National Lacrosse Hall of Fame in 1975.

== Early life and college ==
Adams attended St. Paul's School in Brooklandville, Maryland, where he was a four-year letterwinner on the varsity lacrosse team. He then went on to college at Johns Hopkins University, where he played lacrosse as a midfielder, football as an end and quarterback, and basketball as a forward. Adams played on the Blue Jays' national championship teams in 1947, 1948, and 1950. The United States Intercollegiate Lacrosse Association named him an honorable mention All-American midfielder in 1948. The following season, the USILA named him to the USILA first team, and in 1950, to the third team. Adams participated in the 1949 and 1950 North/South Collegiate All-Star Games.

== Coaching career ==
Adams began his coaching career at the St. Paul's School, where he served as the head lacrosse and football coach from 1951 to 1953. He also taught five classes each day, and from 1952, also served as the school's athletic director. After his stint at St. Paul's, Adams began working as an insurance salesman. He also continued playing lacrosse with the Mount Washington Lacrosse Club in Baltimore from 1951 to 1956. In 1957, he served as the club's head coach.

In 1958, he became the head coach of the Army lacrosse team at the United States Military Academy in West Point, New York, after its previous head coach, F. Morris Touchstone, died of a heart attack. Adams coached the lacrosse team from 1958 to 1969 and also worked as an assistant athletic director. In his first season, he led the Cadets to a perfect record and Army was selected as the 1958 national champions. Against Duke, Adams played 33 different players in a failed attempt to hold down the score. Army won, 21–2. In 1961, in the first nationally televised lacrosse game, Army upset Navy, 10–8, to capture a share of the national championship alongside the Midshipmen. That season, Adams was awarded the F. Morris Touchstone Award as the USILA Coach of the Year. In 1969, the Cadets again defeated Navy to clinch a share of the national co-championship in Adams' final game at Army. The result was a 14–4 rout at Navy–Marine Corps Memorial Stadium in front of 16,056 spectators.

After his daughter graduated from high school in 1969, Adams wanted to work close to where she attended college. They considered the University of Pennsylvania and Yale University, eventually choosing Penn because it offered a free tuition and $14,000 salary for its lacrosse coach. Adams was the head coach at Penn from 1970 to 1978, which was a significant change from Army. He said, "I went from a squad that had two first-team all-American attackmen to a team that consisted of mediocre players. They were all nice kids, but they just didn't have a lot of talent." g His initial years at Penn did result in Adams raising the level of recruiting as he had excellent contacts in both Baltimore and Long Island. This improved the roster during the last 4–5 years he was at Penn. In 1977, his last year, Penn had three first-team All Americans. Adams managed to guide the Quakers to several top-ten rankings, including the No. 4 position in his final year, as well as two NCAA tournament quarterfinal appearances.

While working at a lacrosse camp in New Jersey, a University of Virginia alumnus called Adams and asked why he had not applied for the school's vacant head coach position. Adams responded that he had not known it was open, and after applying, was hired as Virginia's head coach. He remained in that position at Virginia from 1978 to 1992, reaching the NCAA finals in 1980 and 1986. During his tenure there, he led the Cavaliers to 12 NCAA tournament appearances and four semifinals appearances, while they twice finished as runners-up. At the time of his retirement from coaching in 1992, he had the most wins of any active Division I lacrosse coach.

Adams was inducted into the National Lacrosse Hall of Fame in 1975. He died on November 10, 2019, at the age of 91.
