= Dick Edell =

American lacrosse player and coach (1944–2018)

Biographical details
- Born: 1944; Maryland, U.S.
- Died: May 2, 2018 (aged 74); Columbia, Maryland, U.S.

Playing career
- 1964–1967: Towson
- Position: Midfielder

Coaching career (HC unless noted)
- 1969–1970: Towson (freshmen)
- 1971–1973: Calvert Hall H.S.
- 1973–1976: Baltimore
- 1977–1983: Army
- 1984–2001: Maryland

Head coaching record
- Overall: 282–123

Accomplishments and honors

Championships
- 1985 ACC Tournament Championship; 1987 ACC Tournament Championship; 1989 ACC Regular Season Championship; 1998 ACC Tournament Championship

Awards
- 1978 USILA Coach of the Year; 1995 USILA Coach of the Year; 1989 ACC Coach of the Year; 1992 ACC Coach of the Year; 1998 ACC Coach of the Year; 2004 National Lacrosse Hall of Fame

Richard Irving Edell (1944 – May 2, 2018) was an American lacrosse coach. He served as the head coach for the University of Maryland, United States Military Academy, and University of Baltimore's men's lacrosse teams. Edell was inducted into the US Lacrosse Hall of Fame in 2004, at which time he held the second-most NCAA tournament appearances of any head coach.

== Early life ==
Born in Maryland in 1944, Edell attended Towson University, where he played lacrosse and was named an honorable mention All-American as a midfielder in 1967. He graduated in 1967 with a degree in physical education. Edell continued his education, earning a master's degree in education from Western Maryland (now McDaniel College) in 1970 and, later while coaching, a master's degree in science from the University of Baltimore in 1976.

== Coaching career ==
Edell's first coaching position was as the freshman team coach at his alma mater, Towson, where he served for two years. He then held the head coaching position at Calvert Hall High School for three years, and led his team to the 1971 and 1972 Maryland Scholastic Association (MSA) championships. The University of Baltimore provided him his first collegiate head coaching opportunity, and, in four years, he led the team to three NCAA Division II tournaments. During that time, he also coached UB's soccer team, which he led to the 1975 NCAA Division II national championship. In 1977, Edell took over as the Army head coach. During his seven-year tenure, he compiled a 66–24 record and led the Cadets to four NCAA tournament appearances. He also coached Army Black Knights men's soccer from 1979 to 1981.

Edell took over as the Maryland head coach starting with the 1984 season. During his 18-year tenure there, he led the Terrapins to three Atlantic Coast Conference (ACC) titles and 13 NCAA tournament appearances, which included three appearances in the championship game. In his second year with the Terrapins, he led the team to a 2–1 conference record to secure the championship. The following season, Maryland finished with a 10–3 overall record and advanced to the NCAA quarterfinals before elimination. In 1987, Edell led Maryland to a perfect 3–0 mark for the conference title and led the team to the NCAA semifinals. From 1991 to 1998, the Terrapins secured an NCAA tournament berth each season. In 1995, 1997, and 1998, Maryland advanced to the tournament final before being eliminated. In 1998, the Terps again finished with a perfect conference mark, 3–0. In 2001, he retired from coaching due to a non-life-threatening health issue, inclusion body myositis. The 57-year-old Edell said, "My mind and heart want to do this, but my body won't."

In 2011, first-year Maryland head coach John Tillman led Maryland to the national championship game, and he contacted Edell for advice. Edell, whose teams lost their three championship game appearances, told The Washington Times

"I said 'John, I tried practicing on Sunday. I tried not practicing on Sunday. I can't give you any help for Monday' ... We thought long and hard after the first one [a 13–9 loss to Syracuse]. I don't know if we made mistakes. I don't have the answer. Whatever he does on Monday, he's on his own.I will counsel people on the semifinals. I don't have a useful thing to say about the final."

== Records and honors ==
At the time of his retirement, Edell, with 282 wins, was the fifth-winningest all-time head coach in terms of wins, and the sixth-winningest active head coach in terms of winning percentage. He was also the second-winningest active head coach by wins, behind Jack Emmer of Army with 289, and the winningest all-time ACC coach, with 171 wins, ahead of Jim Adams of Virginia with 137. Edell had the second-most NCAA Division I tournament appearances, with 17, behind Roy Simmons, Jr. of Syracuse who had 18. He was the seventh head coach to reach the 400-game benchmark and the first ACC head coach to reach the 150-win benchmark.

The United States Intercollegiate Lacrosse Association (USILA) twice named Edell the National Coach of the Year: in 1978 with Army and in 1995 with Maryland. The Atlantic Coast Conference named him the ACC Coach of the Year three times: in 1989, 1992, and 1998. In 2004, Edell was inducted into the US Lacrosse Hall of Fame. He was also inducted into the US Lacrosse Potomac Chapter Hall of Fame, the US Lacrosse Greater Baltimore Chapter Hall of Fame, the University of Maryland Athletic Hall of Fame, the University of Baltimore Athletic Hall of Fame, the Towson University Hall of Fame and the Army West Point Athletic Hall of Fame.

== Personal life ==
Edell and his wife, Dolores, had four children. He died at a hospital in Columbia, Maryland from pneumonia on May 2, 2018, at the age of 74.

== Head coaching record ==
Record table
Season	Team	Overall	Conference	Standing	Postseason
Baltimore Bees (NCAA independent) (1973–1976)
1973	Baltimore				
1974	Baltimore				NCAA Division II quarterfinals
1975	Baltimore				
1976	Baltimore				NCAA Division II quarterfinals
Baltimore:		45–26 (.634)			
Army Cadets (NCAA independent) (1977–1983)
1977	Army	8–3			
1978	Army	10–3			NCAA Division I quarterfinals
1979	Army	10–3			
1980	Army	8–4			
1981	Army	10–4			NCAA Division I quarterfinals
1982	Army	9–4			NCAA Division I quarterfinals
1983	Army	11–3			NCAA Division I quarterfinals
Army:		66–24 (.733)			
Maryland Terrapins (Atlantic Coast Conference) (1984–2001)
1984	Maryland	7–4	1–2	3rd	
1985	Maryland	7–5	2–1	T–1st	
1986	Maryland	10–3	2–1	2nd	NCAA Division I quarterfinals
1987	Maryland	12–1	3–0	1st	NCAA Division I semifinals
1988	Maryland	6–4	1–2	3rd	
1989	Maryland	10–4	3–0	1st	NCAA Division I semifinals
1990	Maryland	7–5	1–2	3rd	
1991	Maryland	10–5	1–2	3rd	NCAA Division I semifinals
1992	Maryland	9–5	2–1	2nd	NCAA Division I quarterfinals
1993	Maryland	6–6	0–3	4th	NCAA Division I first round
1994	Maryland	7–6	1–2	T–3rd	NCAA Division I first round
1995	Maryland	12–4	2–1	2nd	NCAA Division I runner-up
1996	Maryland	10–3	2–1	T–1st	NCAA Division I quarterfinals
1997	Maryland	11–5	1–2	3rd	NCAA Division I runner-up
1998	Maryland	14–3	3–0	1st	NCAA Division I runner-up
1999	Maryland	9–5	1–2	T–3rd	
2000	Maryland	11–5	1–2	3rd	NCAA Division I quarterfinals
2001	Maryland	13–3	3–0	T–1st	NCAA Division I quarterfinals
Maryland:		171–76 (.692)	29–25 (.537)		
Total:		282–123 (.696)			
National champion Postseason invitational champion Conference regular season champion Conference regular season and conference tournament champion Division regular season champion Division regular season and conference tournament champion Conference tournament champion
