= Kevin Corrigan (lacrosse) =

American lacrosse coach

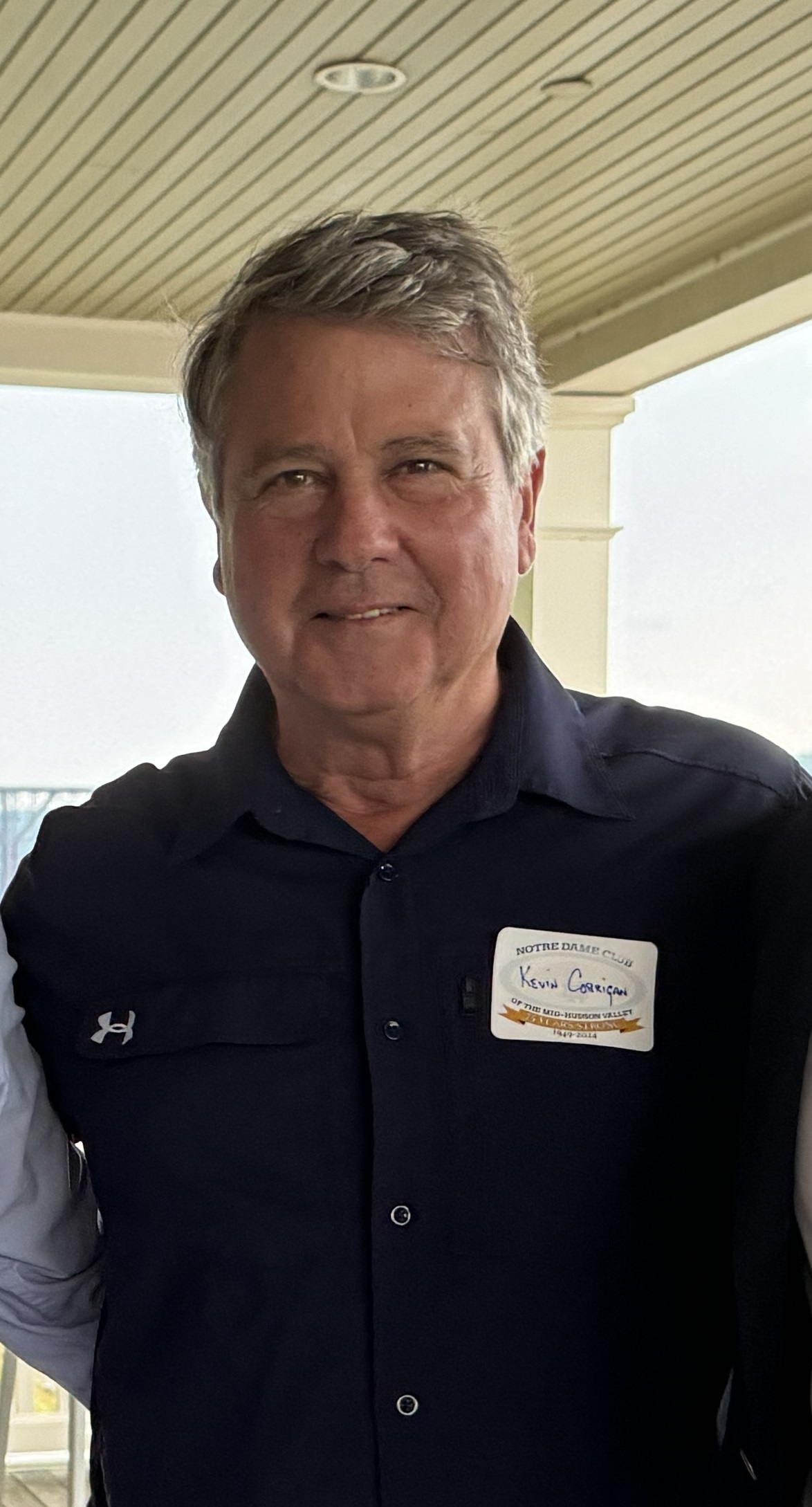
- Corrigan in 2024

Current position
- Title: Head coach
- Team: Notre Dame
- Conference: Atlantic Coast Conference

Biographical details
- Born: 1958 (age 67–68); Charlottesville, Virginia, U.S.
- Education: University of Virginia

Playing career

Lacrosse
- 1978–1980: Virginia

Coaching career (HC unless noted)

Lacrosse
- 1984: Notre Dame (assistant)
- 1985–1986: Randolph–Macon
- 1987–1988: Virginia (assistant)
- 1988–present: Notre Dame

Accomplishments and honors

Championships
- 2 NCAA Division I (2023, 2024)

Awards
- 2× F. Morris Touchstone Award (2023, 2024)

Kevin Michael Corrigan (born 1958) is an American college lacrosse coach who is the head coach of the Notre Dame Fighting Irish. Serving since 1988, he is the longest active tenured coach in men's lacrosse at the Division I level.

== Personal life ==
Corrigan was born in Charlottesville, Virginia in 1958 to an athletic family; his father, Gene Corrigan, and three brothers are all former lacrosse players and coaches. His cousins Lee and Booker Corrigan are also involved in the sport; Lee was the head coach of the Maryland Roughriders and Booker works as an announcer for ESPN.

Corrigan and his wife have three children together; including a son who played lacrosse for Notre Dame under Corrigan's guidance before becoming an assistant coach at Washington and Lee University.

== Career ==
=== Playing career ===
Corrigan played high school lacrosse at Albemarle High School before attending the University of Virginia. While playing as a midfielder for three seasons, he recorded five goals and six assists.

=== Coaching career ===
Upon graduating from the University of Virginia, Corrigan was hired to coach his high school's lacrosse team before accepting an assistant coaching position with the Notre Dame Fighting Irish men's lacrosse team. Following his one-year stint, he agreed to coach the NCAA Division III lacrosse team at Randolph–Macon College. He returned to his alma mater under head coach Jim Adams before accepting a promotion to Head Coach at the University of Notre Dame. In his first few years at Notre Dame, the team played a mostly NCAA Division III schedule and lacked funding. Therefore, he recruited graduate assistants to work as security guards and the team travelled solely by bus. During his first season as Head coach, he led the team to a 6–7 record. In spite of the lack of early success, every senior player during Corrigan's tenure at Notre Dame has graduated. By 1990, Corrigan's Notre Dame program earned their first United States Intercollegiate Lacrosse Association (USILA) national ranking and invitation to the NCAA Championship. Through the mid-1990s, Corrigan's Notre Dame program had moved up to the NCAA Division I level and competed in 10 NCAA tournaments.

As a result of his success, Corrigan was tapped as a potential replacement for Dick Edell with the Maryland Terrapins men's lacrosse team, alongside Dave Cottle and Gary Gait. He chose to stay at Notre Dame, however, and was the recipient of the 2001 Great Western Lacrosse League Coach of the Year award. In 2009, he received the Frenchy Julien Service Award from the USILA for "outstanding and continuous service to the sport."

In 2015, John Baumer and his wife donated $3 million for the University of Notre Dame to endow the head coaching position of the Fighting Irish men's lacrosse team. In his endowed role, Corrigan became the longest active tenured coach in men's lacrosse at the Division I level. Upon entering the 2019 season, he was 24th overall in winningest coaches of all time by percentage, and eighth among those who are active. On April 10, 2019, Corrigan became the third NCAA Division I level lacrosse coach to reach 300 wins, tying him for second in all-time most wins at a single school.

In 2023, Corrigan led the Notre Dame Fighting Irish to the NCAA Division 1 National Championship – the first in the program's history.
