= John Brinkerhoff =

American government official (1928–2020)

John Richmond Brinkerhoff

Associate director for national preparedness of the United States Federal Emergency Management Agency
- In office 1981–1983

Personal details
- Born: January 31, 1928 Ohio, U.S.
- Died: December 18, 2020 (aged 92) Burke, Virginia, U.S.

John Richmond Brinkerhoff (January 31, 1928 – December 18, 2020) was the associate director for national preparedness of the United States Federal Emergency Management Agency (FEMA) from 1981 to 1983.

== Career ==
Before joining FEMA, Brinkerhoff served as the Department of Defense Acting Deputy Assistant Secretary for Reserve Affairs. He had graduated from West Point in the Class of 1950 and spent 24 years on active duty in the Army, retiring in 1974 with the rank of Colonel. Brinkerhoff served tours of duty in Korea, Germany, and Vietnam while in the service.

He joined the Civil Service and was for nine years a career Senior Executive in the Office of the Secretary of Defense and the Federal Emergency Management Agency. After leaving Government in 1983, he became a national security consultant, spending twenty years as an adjunct research staff member of the Institute for Defense Analyses.

He was also notable for his role in planning REX-84, along with Lieutenant-Colonel Oliver North.

== Education ==
Brinkerhoff graduated from Santa Ana High School in Santa Ana, CA in 1946.

Brinkerhoff obtained his BS in Engineering from the United States Military Academy, Class of 1950 and received his MS in Civil Engineering from the California Institute of Technology. He later obtained his MA in Geography from Columbia University, and an MSA in Operations Research from George Washington University.

== Personal life ==
John Brinkerhoff was born in Ohio in 1928 to Herschel and Florence Brinkerhoff (Cross). He was married twice first to Nancy Anne Burns with whom he had 4 children. The couple later divorced and he remarried to Anne Touchstone, daughter of legendary Army lacrosse coach F. Morris Touchstone.

He died in 2020. He was interred at Arlington National Cemetery on July 20, 2022. John Brinkerhoff was a descendant of Epke Jacobse Banta and the Banta Family Dynasty.

== Books ==
Brinkerhoff has written countless articles as well as two books.

== See also ==
- Posse comitatus
- Louis O. Giuffrida
- Iran-Contra
