= John Burness =

American professor and former president of Franklin & Marshall College

John Frederick Burness

Interim President of Franklin & Marshall College
- In office July 1, 2010 – February 28, 2011
- Preceded by: John Anderson Fry
- Succeeded by: Daniel R. Porterfield

Vice-President of Duke University for Public Affairs
- In office 1991–2008

Personal details
- Born: May 16, 1945 Durham, North Carolina
- Died: December 19, 2022 (aged 77)
- Spouse: Anne D. Williams (m. 1975; died 2022)
- Children: 2
- Education: Franklin & Marshall College (BA)
- Occupation: College administrator Professor

John Frederick Burness (May 16, 1945 – December 19, 2022) was an American college administrator. He served as the interim president of Franklin & Marshall College from 2010 to 2011. Before F&M, Burness spent 17 years as the Vice-President for Public Affairs and Government Relations at Duke University.

== Early life ==
Burness was born in Durham, North Carolina on May 16, 1945. Burness married Anne D. Williams in 1975. The couple had two sons, Evan and Sam.

=== Franklin & Marshall student president ===
Burness attended Franklin & Marshall College in Lancaster, Pennsylvania. Burness served as president of student government and graduated in 1967. Upset by lackluster food at the school cafeteria, Burness once marched to the home of college president Keith Spalding to complain about the food. Carrying an ill-prepared pork chop, Burness convinced Spalding to change the college's food supplier.

== Duke University ==
Burness became Vice-President for Public Affairs and Government Relations at Duke University in 1991.

As Vice-President at Duke, Burness was sued by Duke men's lacrosse head coach Mike Pressler in connection with the Duke lacrosse rape hoax. Pressler accused Duke and Burness of defamation in relation to his termination.

Burness retired from Duke in 2008. He returned to Duke as a visiting professor of public policy, serving until 2010.

== Durham Tech ==
Burness was appointed to the Durham Technical Community College Board of Trustees by the Durham Public School Board in 2009. Burness was elected as Chairman of the Board in 2017, holding the position until his death in 2022.

== Franklin & Marshall College ==
Burness was elected to the Franklin & Marshall College Board of Trustees in 2003.

After the resignation of John Anderson Fry in 2010, Burness was installed as interim president by the Board of Trustees on July 1, 2010. Burness highlighted campus development and expading the college financial endowment as priorities for his administration.

Burness left office on the installation of Daniel R. Porterfield as the 15th president of the college. He continued as a college trustee until 2015.
