= 2015 ACC Men's Lacrosse Championship =

American college lacrosse tournament

The 2015 ACC Men's Lacrosse Championship took place April 24–26 at PPL Park in Chester, Pennsylvania. Four teams from the ACC competed in the single elimination competition. The seeds were based upon the teams' regular season conference record.

The Syracuse Orange won the tournament and received the Atlantic Coast Conference's automatic bid to the 2015 NCAA Division I Men's Lacrosse Championship.

== Standings ==
Only the top four teams in the ACC conference advanced to the Atlantic Coast Conference Tournament.

Seed	School	Conference	Overall
1	Notre Dame‡*	4-0	9–2
2	North Carolina*	3–1	12–3
3	Syracuse*	2–2	10–2
4	Duke*	1–3	11–4
5	Virginia	0–4	9–4
‡ Atlantic Coast regular season champions. * Qualify for the tournament.

== Schedule ==
Session	Game	Time*	Matchup^{#}	Score	Television
Semi-finals – Friday, April 24
1	1	5:30 pm	#1 Notre Dame vs. #4 Duke	13–8	ESPN 3
1	2	8:00 pm	#2 North Carolina vs. #3 Syracuse	9–8	ESPN 2
Championship – Sunday, April 26
2	3	1:00pm	#3 Syracuse vs. #4 Duke	15–14	ESPN 2
*Game times in EST. #-Rankings denote tournament seeding.
