= Boo Corrigan =

American athletic director

Current position
- Title: Athletic director
- Team: NC State
- Conference: ACC

Biographical details
- Education: University of Notre Dame, Virginia Commonwealth University

Administrative career (AD unless noted)
- 2002–2004: Navy (associate AD)
- 2004–2008: Notre Dame (associate AD)
- 2008–2011: Duke (associate AD)
- 2011–2019: Army
- 2019–present: NC State

Eugene "Boo" Corrigan is the director of athletics for the NC State Wolfpack. Previously, Corrigan served as athletic director for the United States Military Academy and associate athletic director for Duke University, the University of Notre Dame, and the United States Naval Academy.

Corrigan is the son of Gene Corrigan, former commissioner of the Atlantic Coast Conference. Corrigan graduated from the University of Notre Dame with a bachelor's degree in 1990, and Virginia Commonwealth University with a master's degree in 2013.

Corrigan was named the athletic director at the United States Military Academy on February 1, 2011.

North Carolina State University announced that Corrigan would begin his tenure as the athletic director effective May 1, 2019. In 2022, he was named chair of the selection committee for the College Football Playoff, remaining in that post for the 2023 season. During his tenure as College Football Playoff Chair, the committee came under scrutiny due to its controversial decision to leave the Florida State Seminoles out of the playoffs, making them the first ever undefeated Power Five conference team to be denied the opportunity.
