= Mike Manley (lacrosse) =

American lacrosse player (born 1988)

Personal information
- Nationality: American
- Born: July 21, 1988 (age 38) Penn Yan, New York, U.S.
- Height: 6 ft 1 in (185 cm)
- Weight: 204 lb (93 kg; 14 st 8 lb)

Sport
- Position: Defense
- Shoots: Right
- NCAA team: Duke Blue Devils (2012)
- NLL draft: 2012, 32nd overall Philadelphia Wings
- NLL team Former teams: Georgia Swarm; Philadelphia Wings; New England Black Wolves; Rochester Knighthawks; New York Riptide
- MLL draft: 3rd overall, 2012; Rochester Rattlers
- MLL teams: Rochester Rattlers
- PLL team: Denver Outlaws
- Pro career: 2012–

Career highlights
- ACC Freshman of the Year (2007); 2x MLL Defensive Player of the Year (2014, 2016); 3x MLL All-Star Selection (2013, 2014, 2018); 2x PLL All-Star Selection (2022,2023); Brendan Looney Leadership Award (2026)

Mike Manley (born July 21, 1988, in Penn Yan, New York) is an American professional lacrosse player who plays as a defenseman for Denver Outlaws in the Premier Lacrosse League and the Georgia Swarm of the National Lacrosse League.

== Professional MLL career ==
Manley was selected with the 3rd pick of the 2012 Major League Lacrosse Collegiate Draft by the Rochester Rattlers. In his rookie season Manley, appeared in 11 games and picked up 35 ground balls. In his second season of play Manley scored 3 goals while managing to get 20 ground balls. During the 2014 season Manley scored 8 goals while obtaining a single assist and 37 ground balls good enough to earn the 2014 Warrior Defensive Player of the Year award. Manley's 2015 season was cut off short due to a season-ending injury and only appeared in 5 games where he picked up 25 ground balls and obtained a single assist. In 2018 Manley went with the team in the move to Dallas. He appeared in 7 games and recorded 1 goal and 17 ground balls.

== Professional NLL career ==
Manley was drafted with the 32nd pick of the fourth round in 2012 National Lacrosse League Entry Draft by the Philadelphia Wings. Manley played for the Wings for two seasons appearing in 31 games while managing to gather 10 points and 127 loose balls. He spent his 2015 season with the New England Black Wolves. Manley played for the expansion New York Riptide in the 2019–20 season, before being traded in the offseason to the Rochester Knighthawks.

Manley signed a two-year contract with the Georgia Swarm on August 17, 2022.

== Professional PLL career ==
On October 22, 2018, it was announced that Manley was joining the Premier Lacrosse League for the summer 2019 season. On March 4, 2019, it was announced that Manley was joining the Chrome Lacrosse Club.

== Prep and college career ==
Manley was a five-year letterman at Penn Yan Academy, where he went on to play in the state finals as a freshman, and the semi-finals as a sophomore, junior and senior. At Duke, Manley started in 74 of his 75 career games.

== Personal ==
Manley works full time as a New York State Trooper.

== NCAA statistics ==
		Regular Season
Season	Team	GP	G	A	Pts
2008	Duke	18	1	1	2
2009	Duke	18	1	0	1
2010	Duke	19	0	1	1
2012	Duke	20	2	2	4
College totals		75	4	4	8

== MLL statistics ==
Season	Team	Regular season											Playoffs										
Season	Team	GP	G	2PG	A	Pts	Sh	GB	Pen	PIM	FOW	FOA	GP	G	2PG	A	Pts	Sh	GB	Pen	PIM	FOW	FOA
2012	Rochester Rattlers	11	0	0	0	0	3	35	0	7	0	0	–	–	–	–	–	–	–	–	–	–	–
2013	Rochester Rattlers	13	3	0	0	3	11	30	0	9	0	0	–	–	–	–	–	–	–	–	–	–	–
2014	Rochester Rattlers	14	6	2	1	9	21	37	0	6.5	0	0	2	0	0	0	0	0	3	0	0	0	0
2015	Rochester Rattlers	5	0	0	1	1	4	25	0	3.5	0	0	–	–	–	–	–	–	–	–	–	–	–
2016	Rochester Rattlers	11	5	0	0	5	14	30	0	5.5	0	0	–	–	–	–	–	–	–	–	–	–	–
2017	Rochester Rattlers	2	0	0	0	0	1	9	0	1	0	0	–	–	–	–	–	–	–	–	–	–	–
2018	Dallas Rattlers	7	1	0	0	1	10	17	0	4.5	0	0	–	–	–	–	–	–	–	–	–	–	–
		63	15	2	2	19	64	183	0	37	0	0	2	0	0	0	0	0	3	0	0	0	0
Career total:		65	15	2	2	19	64	186	0	37	0	0											

GP–Games played; G–Goals; 2PG–2-point goals; A–Assists; Pts–Points; Sh–Shots; GB–Ground balls; Pen–Penalties; PIM–Penalty minutes; FOW–Faceoffs won; FOA–Faceoffs attempted

== PLL statistics ==
Season	Team	Regular season											Playoffs										
Season	Team	GP	G	2PG	A	Pts	Sh	GB	Pen	PIM	FOW	FOA	GP	G	2PG	A	Pts	Sh	GB	Pen	PIM	FOW	FOA
2019	Chrome	8	1	1	1	3	1	15	3	3	0	0	–	–	–	–	–	–	–	–	–	–	–
2020	Chrome	5	1	0	0	1	5	13	1	1	0	0	–	–	–	–	–	–	–	–	–	–	–
2021	Chrome	9	2	1	1	4	8	14	3	3	0	0	–	–	–	–	–	–	–	–	–	–	–
2022	Chrome	10	1	0	2	3	6	20	4	4	0	0	1	0	0	0	0	2	1	0	0	0	0
2023	Chrome	10	2	0	0	2	12	25	3	3	0	0	–	–	–	–	–	–	–	–	–	–	–
2024	Denver Outlaws	10	0	0	1	1	6	21	2	1.5	0	0	1	0	0	0	0	1	4	0	0	0	0
2025	Denver Outlaws	10	3	1	1	5	6	19	4	4	0	0	2	0	0	0	0	3	1	0	0	0	0
2026	Denver Outlaws	10	0	0	0	0	4	20	1	0.5	0	0	3	0	0	0	0	1	5	1	1	0	0
		72	10	3	6	19	48	147	21	20	0	0	7	0	0	0	0	6	11	1	1	0	0
Career total:		79	10	3	6	19	54	158	22	21	0	0											

GP–Games played; G–Goals; 2PG–2-point goals; A–Assists; Pts–Points; Sh–Shots; GB–Ground balls; Pen–Penalties; PIM–Penalty minutes; FOW–Faceoffs won; FOA–Faceoffs attempted

== NLL statistics ==
Mike Manley		Regular season									Playoffs								
Season	Team	GP	G	A	Pts	LB	PIM	Pts/GP	LB/GP	PIM/GP	GP	G	A	Pts	LB	PIM	Pts/GP	LB/GP	PIM/GP
2013	Philadelphia Wings	15	2	4	6	67	26	0.40	4.47	1.73	1	0	0	0	5	0	0.00	5.00	0.00
2014	Philadelphia Wings	16	1	3	4	60	6	0.25	3.75	0.38	–	–	–	–	–	–	–	–	–
2015	New England Black Wolves	18	2	7	9	62	58	0.50	3.44	3.22	–	–	–	–	–	–	–	–	–
2016	Rochester Knighthawks	2	0	0	0	6	2	0.00	3.00	1.00	–	–	–	–	–	–	–	–	–
2019	Rochester Knighthawks	7	0	1	1	31	4	0.14	4.43	0.57	–	–	–	–	–	–	–	–	–
2020	New York Riptide	6	0	0	0	18	8	0.00	3.00	1.33	–	–	–	–	–	–	–	–	–
2023	Georgia Swarm	17	1	3	4	82	15	0.24	4.82	0.88	–	–	–	–	–	–	–	–	–
2024	Georgia Swarm	18	1	4	5	69	38	0.28	3.83	2.11	1	0	0	0	5	0	0.00	5.00	0.00
2025	Georgia Swarm	18	2	5	7	60	16	0.39	3.33	0.89	1	0	0	0	3	4	0.00	3.00	4.00
2026	Georgia Swarm	18	1	1	2	62	14	0.11	3.44	0.78	4	1	3	4	11	5	1.00	2.75	1.25
		135	10	28	38	517	187	0.28	3.83	1.39	7	1	3	4	24	9	0.57	3.43	1.29
Career Total:		142	11	31	42	541	196	0.30	3.81	1.38									

GP–Games played; G–Goals; A–Assists; Pts–Points; LB–Loose balls; PIM–Penalty minutes; Pts/GP–Points per games played; LB/GP–Loose balls per games played; PIM/GP–Penalty minutes per games played.
