= Bob Shillinglaw =

American lacrosse coach

Robert Shillinglaw (born 1953) is an American lacrosse coach, noteworthy for having been the head coach of the University of Delaware Mens Lacrosse team since 1978. His record in 40 years of coaching at the college level is 305-273. Shillinglaw, former Army and Cortland State coach Jack Emmer, as well as former Penn State coach Glenn Thiel are the only coaches in NCAA lacrosse history to coach 500 games.

Born in Annapolis, Maryland, Shillinglaw was a star athlete at Severna Park High School and earned a spot at University of North Carolina playing lacrosse.

He is the coach with the most wins in Delaware's 60-year lacrosse history. He coached his 1984, 1999, 2005, 2007, 2010 and 2011 teams to NCAA Tournament appearances, including the 2007 Final Four appearance, and led his 1979 squad to a 13-2 mark and was named USILA Coach of the Year.

In 2007, Shillinglaw led the University of Delaware Mens Lacrosse team to its finest season with a 13-6 overall record capturing the Colonial Athletic Association Tournament title and making its first ever NCAA Final Four appearance. On May 26, 2007 the Delaware team lost in the semi-final round to Johns Hopkins University by a score of 8-3 at M&T Bank Stadium in Baltimore, Maryland, the lowest scoring semi-final game in NCAA history, before 52,004 fans.

Currently he resides in Elkton, Maryland, and is an assistant professor at the University of Delaware.

As of February 4, 2012, Shillinglaw became one of three active coaches to have won at least 300 games in their coaching careers after a win against the University of Detroit Mercy.

He was inducted into the Delaware Sports Hall of Fame in 2022.
