= Hofstra Pride men's lacrosse =

Hofstra Pride
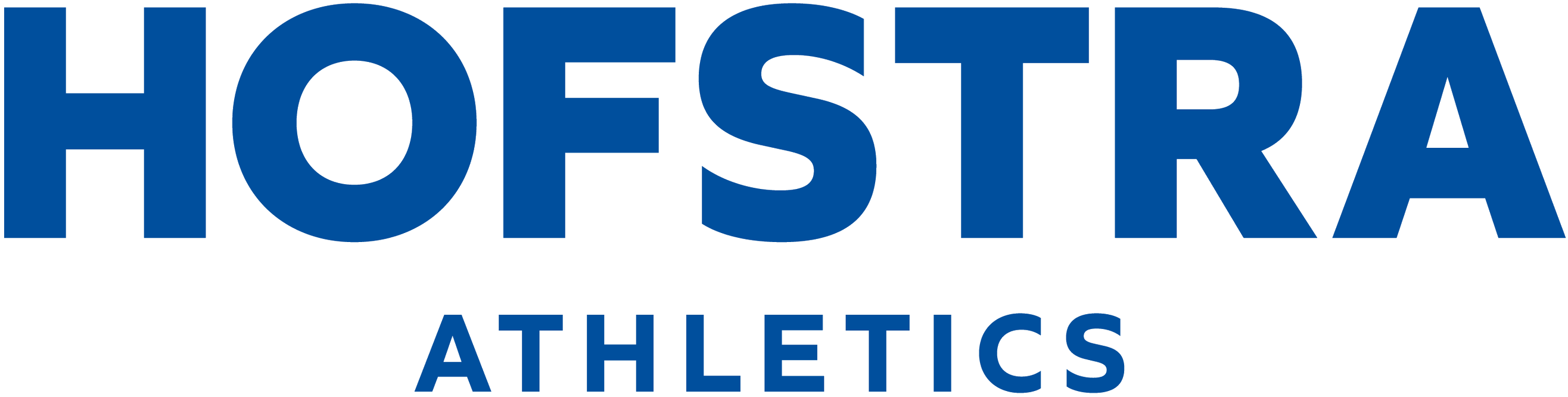
- Founded: 1949; 77 years ago
- University: Hofstra University
- Head coach: Seth Tierney (since 2007 season)
- Stadium: James M. Shuart Stadium (capacity: 13,000)
- Location: Hempstead, New York
- Conference: CAA
- Nickname: Pride
- Colors: Blue, white, and gold

Pre-NCAA era championships
- (1) – 1955 (Division II Champion, Laurie Cox Trophy)

NCAA Tournament Quarterfinals
- (9) - 1971, 1973, 1974, 1975, 1978, 1993, 1999, 2001, 2006

NCAA Tournament appearances
- (17) - 1971, 1973, 1974, 1975, 1978, 1993, 1996, 1997, 1999, 2000, 2001, 2003, 2006, 2008, 2009, 2010, 2011

Conference Tournament championships
- (3) - 2000, 2006, 2008

Conference regular season championships
- (12) - 1988, 1989, 1995, 1996, 1997, 1998, 2000, 2006, 2008, 2009, 2011, 2014

The Hofstra Pride men's lacrosse team represents Hofstra University in the CAA in the National Collegiate Athletic Association (NCAA) Division I men's lacrosse competition. They play at James M. Shuart Stadium in Hempstead, New York.

== History ==
Hofstra fielded its first varsity men's lacrosse team in 1949, hiring Howdy Myers the following season from Johns Hopkins to take over the program. Myers had previously won three national titles with Hopkins.

Myers quickly got the program to a high level, where in 1955 Hofstra was 14 and 2, and ranked 3rd in the country. Hofstra defeated Rutgers that season 16-6, to win the Division II national title, Laurie Cox Trophy.

In 1971 Myers guided the Flying Dutchmen, as the team was known then, to a 12–4 record a number 10 ranking, as well as an at large bid to the first-ever 1971 NCAA tournament.

Hofstra has made seventeen postseason appearances in the NCAA tournament reaching the quarterfinals four times, in 1993, 1999, 2001 and 2006. Hofstra closest effort at making the NCAA final four was in 2006, when they lost in overtime to Massachusetts in the NCAA Quarterfinals, 11–10, after UMass had come back from a 10–5 deficit in the 4th quarter.

The Pride were ranked second in the nation in 2006 and received a number three seed in the NCAA tournament. Coached by current Duke coach John Danowski, Hofstra won 17 straight games losing only their season opener and the quarterfinal match, both to Massachusetts.

== Notable Athletes and Coaches ==
- Jon Cooper
- Athan Iannucci
- James Metzger
- Brett Moyer
- Howdy Myers
- Doug Shanahan

== Retired numbers ==
Hofstra Pride lacrosse retired numbers
No.	Player	Pos.	Tenure	Ref.
10	Jerry Simandl		1953–55	
26	Doug Shanahan	MF	1997–2001	
56	James Metzger		1979–82	

== Lacrosse Hall Of Fame Members ==
- Michael D'Amato
- John Danowski
- Rudy Fiorvanti
- Bob Hiller
- Kevin Huff
- Tom Kessler
- Walter Kohanowich
- Al Lahood
- Phil Marino
- James Metzger
- Phil Mordente
- Howdy Myers
- Carl Orent
- Harry Royle
- Doug Shanahan
- Dr. James M. Shuart
- Jerry Simandl
- Vinnie Sombrotto
- Owen Walsh

== Season Results ==
The following is a list of Hofstra's results by season as an NCAA Division I program:

Season	Coach	Overall	Conference	Standing	Postseason
Howdy Myers (Independent) (1950–1975)
1971	Howdy Myers	12–4			NCAA Division I Quarterfinals
1972	Howdy Myers	5–11			
1973	Howdy Myers	12–2			NCAA Division I Quarterfinals
1974	Howdy Myers	9–3			NCAA Division I Quarterfinals
1975	Howdy Myers	10–3			NCAA Division I Quarterfinals
Howdy Myers:		216–139–4 (.607)			
Harry Royle (Independent) (1976–1985)
1976	Harry Royle	7–4			
1977	Harry Royle	7–5			
1978	Harry Royle	8–5			NCAA Division I Quarterfinals
1979	Harry Royle	6–6			
1980	Harry Royle	7–6			
1981	Harry Royle	3–8			
1982	Harry Royle	3–10			
1983	Harry Royle	9–5			
1984	Harry Royle	8–6			
1985	Harry Royle	3–11			
Harry Royle:		61–66 (.480)			
John Danowski (Independent) (1986–1987)
1986	John Danowski	4–9			
John Danowski (East Coast Conference) (1987–1991)
1987	John Danowski	7–9	3–3		
1988	John Danowski	12–3	5–0	1st	
1989	John Danowski	11–4	5–0	1st	
1990	John Danowski	9–5	4–1		
1991	John Danowski	7–7	2–2		
John Danowski (Independent) (1992–1994)
1992	John Danowski	4–9			
1993	John Danowski	10–6			NCAA Division I Quarterfinals
1994	John Danowski	6–7			
John Danowski (America East Conference) (1995–2001)
1995	John Danowski	9–5	5–0	1st	
1996	John Danowski	9–5	5–0	1st	NCAA Division I First Round
1997	John Danowski	9–6	6–0	1st	NCAA Division I First Round
1998	John Danowski	10–4	5–0	1st	
1999	John Danowski	13–3	4–1		NCAA Division I Quarterfinals
2000	John Danowski	11–5	4–1	T–1st	NCAA Division I First Round
2001	John Danowski	10–7	4–1		NCAA Division I Quarterfinals
John Danowski (Colonial Athletic Association) (2002–2006)
2002	John Danowski	11–3	5–1	2nd	
2003	John Danowski	11–6	4–1	2nd	NCAA Division I First Round
2004	John Danowski	4–10	2–3	T–3rd	
2005	John Danowski	8–8	3–2	T–3rd	
2006	John Danowski	17–2	6–0	1st	NCAA Division I Quarterfinals
John Danowski:		192–123 (.610)	72–16 (.818)		
Seth Tierney (Colonial Athletic Association) (2007–Present)
2007	Seth Tierney	6–8	3–3	4th	
2008	Seth Tierney	10–6	5–1	T–1st	NCAA Division I First Round
2009	Seth Tierney	11–4	6–0	1st	NCAA Division I First Round
2010	Seth Tierney	9–5	2–3	T–4th	NCAA Division I First Round
2011	Seth Tierney	13–3	5–1	1st	NCAA Division I First Round
2012	Seth Tierney	6–8	2–4	T–4th	
2013	Seth Tierney	7–7	2–4	T–4th	
2014	Seth Tierney	11–5	4–1	T–1st	
2015	Seth Tierney	5–9	2–3	T–4th	
2016	Seth Tierney	9–6	3–2	3rd	
2017	Seth Tierney	11–3	3–2	T–2nd	
2018	Seth Tierney	6–8	2–3	4th	
2019	Seth Tierney	5–9	2–3	T–4th	
2020	Seth Tierney	4–3	0–0	†	†
2021	Seth Tierney	8–6	4–4	T–3rd	
2022	Seth Tierney	6–9	2–3	T–4th	
2023	Seth Tierney	5–9	3–4	6th	
2024	Seth Tierney	6–9	3-4	T–4th	
2025	Seth Tierney	8–7	4–3	T–3rd	
2026	Seth Tierney	1–2	0–0		
Seth Tierney:		147–120 (.551)	57–48 (.543)		
Total:		612–443–4 (.580)			
National champion Postseason invitational champion Conference regular season champion Conference regular season and conference tournament champion Division regular season champion Division regular season and conference tournament champion Conference tournament champion

†NCAA canceled 2020 collegiate activities due to the COVID-19 virus.
