= 2008 NCAA Division I men's lacrosse tournament =

American college lacrosse tournament

- Dates: May 10–26, 2008
- Teams: 16
- Finals site: Gillette Stadium, Foxborough, Massachusetts
- Champions: Syracuse (9th title)
- Runner-up: Johns Hopkins (18th title game)
- Semifinalists: Duke (4th Final Four); Virginia (19th Final Four)
- Winning coach: John Desko (4th title)
- MOP: Mike Leveille, Syracuse
- Attendance: 48,224 semi-finals 48,970 finals 97,194 total
- Top scorer: Mike Leveille, Syracuse (19 goals)

The 2008 NCAA Division I lacrosse tournament was the 38th annual tournament hosted by the National Collegiate Athletic Association to determine the team champion of men's college lacrosse among its Division I programs. The tournament was played from May 10–26, 2008.

Syracuse beat Johns Hopkins in the championship game, 13–10.

The championship game was played at Gillette Stadium, the home of the NFL's New England Patriots, in Foxborough, Massachusetts, with a crowd of 48,970 fans.

The first round of the single-elimination tournament was played on May 10–11 at the home field of the top-seeded team. The quarterfinals were held on May 17–18 on two separate neutral fields: the Navy–Marine Corps Memorial Stadium in Annapolis, Maryland, and Schoellkopf Field in Ithaca, New York. The tournament culminated with the semifinals and finals held on Memorial Day weekend. The championship weekend, which included the Division II and Division III championships, was hosted by Harvard University and the Eastern College Athletic Conference.

== Qualifying ==
The Division I NCAA Men's Lacrosse Committee was responsible for selecting the teams that competed in the championship tournament. The qualifying teams, along with the seeding for each team in the tournament, were announced on Sunday, May 4, 2008. Seven conferences received automatic bids to the tournament for its top team. The remaining nine teams were selected as "at large" bids by the committee.

Five conferences held a conference tournament championship to award the conferences' bid. Canisius earned an automatic bid by winning the Metro Atlantic Athletic Conference (MAAC) championship which marked the first time that Canisius College has gained entry to the National Championship tournament. Colgate earned an automatic bid by winning its first-ever Patriot League championship. Hofstra earned an automatic bid by winning Colonial Athletic Association (CAA) championship, Notre Dame earned an automatic bid by winning Great Western Lacrosse League (GWLL) championship, and UMBC earned an automatic bid by winning America East Conference championship.

Two conferences award their bids based on regular season conference records. Loyola earned an automatic bid by winning the Eastern College Athletic Conference (ECAC) championship with a 6–1 conference record. The Ivy League's automatic bid was awarded to Cornell. Cornell and Brown had identical conference records, but due to a victory by Cornell in head-to-head competition earlier in the season the tiebreaker was given to Cornell.

The Atlantic Coast Conference (ACC) conference tournament champion was Duke. However, the ACC does not receive an automatic bid to the NCAA tournament because a conference must have at least six members competing (for 2 years) in order to be awarded an automatic bid.

The following teams were awarded at-large bids by the NCAA Selection Committee: Duke (ACC), Virginia (ACC), Syracuse (Independent), North Carolina (ACC), Johns Hopkins (Independent), Maryland (ACC), Denver (GWLL), Navy (Patriot), and Ohio State (GWLL).

== Bracket ==
First Round; May 10–11
1	Duke	12
Loyola Maryland	7
8	Cornell	7
Ohio State	15
5	Johns Hopkins	10
Hofstra	4
4	North Carolina	7
Navy	8
3	Syracuse	20
Canisius	3
6	Notre Dame	8*
Colgate	7
7	Maryland	10
Denver	7
2	Virginia	10
UMBC	9

Quarterfinals; May 17–18
1	Duke	21
Ohio State	10
5	Johns Hopkins	10
Navy	4
3	Syracuse	11
6	Notre Dame	9
7	Maryland	7
2	Virginia	8*

Semifinals; May 24
1	Duke	9
5	Johns Hopkins	10
3	Syracuse	12*
2	Virginia	11

Final; May 26
5	Johns Hopkins	10
3	Syracuse	13

- * = Overtime

== Game summaries ==
=== First round ===
The first round of the 2008 championship tournament saw upsets, an overtime game.

Unseeded Ohio State bested #8 Cornell 15–7. The opening goal of this game was scored by Ohio State goaltender Stefan Schroder, who ran the length of the field to put one past the Big Red netminder. Navy upset #4 seeded North Carolina in Chapel Hill with a final score of 8–7 on the strong play of the Midshipmen defense and the four goal effort of Tim Paul, who was honored with Nike Player of the Week honors. Notre Dame, who was hosting its first NCAA Tournament game, topped Colgate in a contest that was settled in overtime. In a victory over Loyola, Duke's Matt Danowski broke the NCAA career points record, eclipsing Joe Vasta's mark. Syracuse ended Canisius's first ever appearance in the tournament early with a 20–3 victory. Johns Hopkins was led by Paul Rabil's four goals in a 10–4 win over Hofstra. Virginia's Garrett Billings third goal of the game with 6:50 left in the game sealed the Cavaliers win over UMBC. Maryland beat GWLL's Denver 10–7.

=== Quarterfinals ===
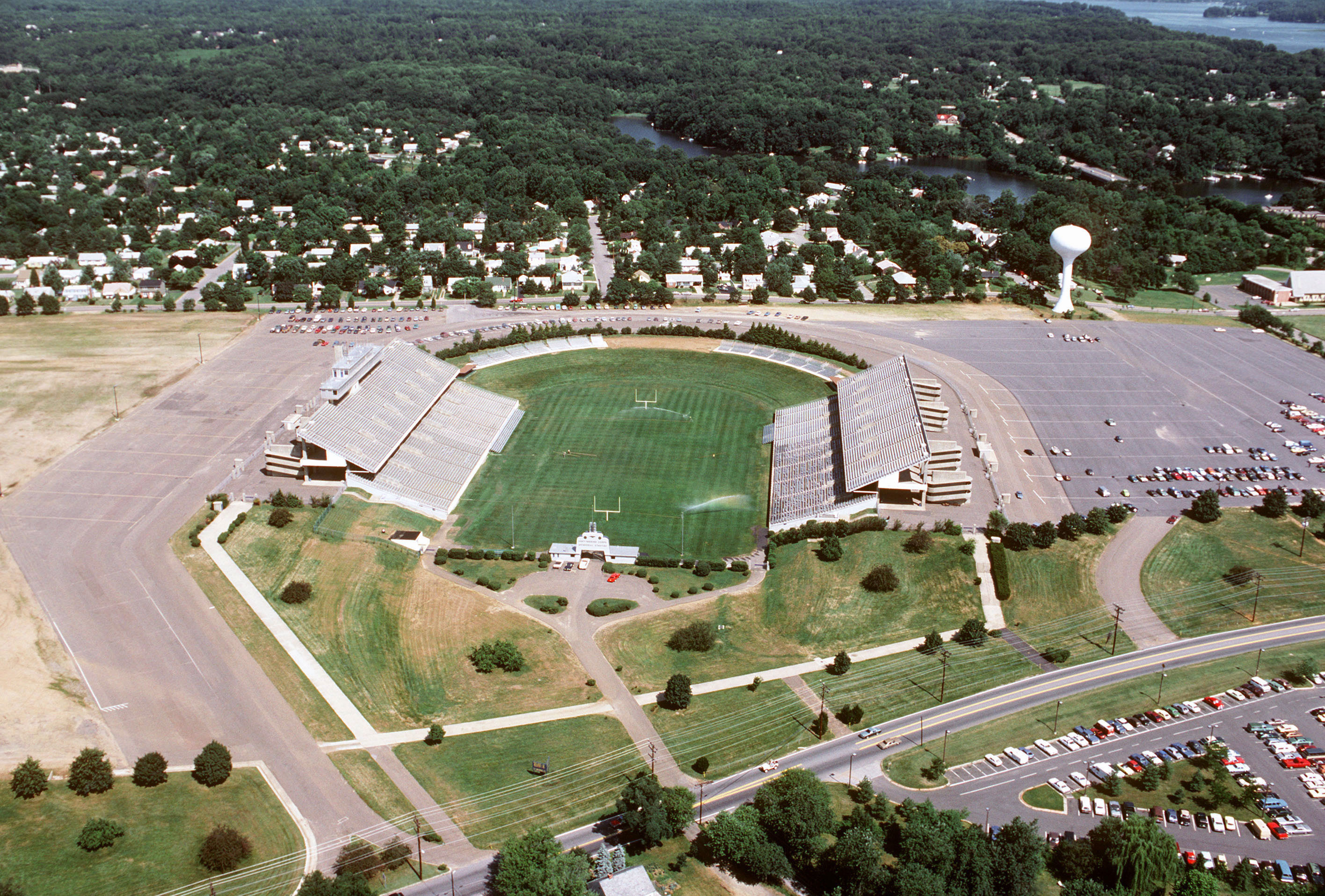
Navy–Marine Corps Memorial Stadium, location of most highly attended lacrosse quarterfinal in NCAA history

The quarterfinals were held at two separate locations the weekend of May 17 and May 18. On Saturday, 17,017 people attended the quarterfinals at Navy–Marine Corps Memorial Stadium. This set an attendance record for the most people to attend the quarterfinal round of the lacrosse championships. Fans in attendance saw Johns Hopkins defeat Navy 10–4. Navy was held without a goal for both the second and third quarters. The other game played in Annapolis was Maryland versus Virginia, which went into overtime. Ben Rubeor scored the game-winning goal in the extra period to send the Cavaliers to the semifinals.

On Sunday, at Cornell's Schoellkopf Field, Syracuse defeated Notre Dame 11–9 on the play of midfielder Dan Hardy who recorded four points, including three goals and the game winning score. Also, Duke routed Ohio State 21–10 on the offensive efforts of Zack Greer who recorded a career-high eleven points on six goals and five assists.

=== Final Four ===
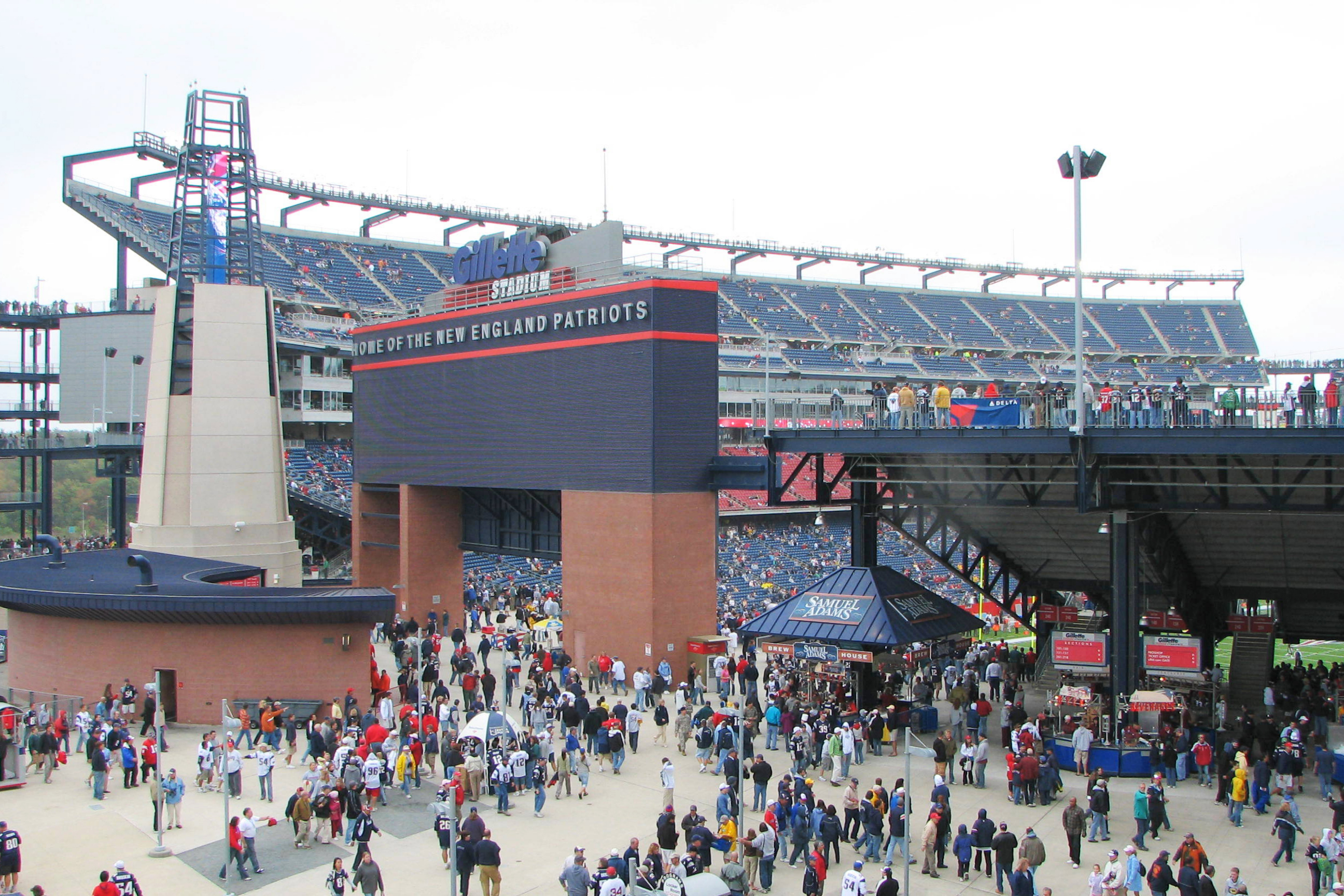
Gillette Stadium, the location of semifinals and finals of the 2008 Championships

On Saturday, May 24, 48,224 fans were spectators for the 2008 Division I Final Four doubleheader held at Gillette Stadium in Foxborough, Massachusetts. The first game featured Syracuse versus Virginia, and the second was a rematch of last year's championship game between Johns Hopkins and Duke.

==== Syracuse vs. Virginia ====
	1	2	3	4	OT	Total
SU	2	1	3	5	1	12
UVA	3	3	3	2	0	11

In the first game of the Final Four doubleheader, Syracuse defeated Virginia 12–11 in a double overtime thriller.

Virginia commanded the first half of the contest due in part to extra-man opportunities resulting from penalties by Syracuse. In the second quarter, the Cavaliers went on a run of five unanswered goals and entered half-time with a 6–3 lead, and the game's momentum. The game remained in Virginia's favor through the third quarter, prior to the Orange fourth quarter comeback.

Syracuse's Mike Leveille scored five goals, including a goal with 3:00 remaining in the game to send the game into overtime, and the eventual game-winner in the second overtime period to propel the Orange into the Championship game. Syracuse's come-from-behind victory included scoring six of the final eight goals of the contest.

Syracuse's Junior midfielder Matt Abbott, known more for his groundball and clearing game, tallied three goals in the second half for his first career hat trick to spark to second half rally. Extra possessions earned by face-off specialist Danny Brennan, including both opportunities in the overtime periods and 70% total for the game, helped the Orange stage the comeback. While, Syracuse goalkeeper John Galloway settled down in the second half and made a number game saving stops as regulation time expired.

Virginia scoring was led by Danny Glading with three goals and one assist, while Garret Billings scored two goals. Ben Rubeor, a Tewaaraton Trophy finalist, was held to one point on an assist.

==== Johns Hopkins vs. Duke ====
	1	2	3	4	Total
JHU	1	3	3	3	10
Duke	2	0	3	4	9

Johns Hopkins defeated Duke 10–9 in the second game of the Final Four doubleheader. The heavily favored Duke team, who had beaten the Blue Jays earlier in the season 17–6, were handed only their second loss of the season.

Hopkins controlled the deliberate tempo of the game, and held a 4–2 lead going into halftime. After scoring first after halftime, Hopkins saw Duke pull even with three goals in 45 seconds during the third quarter, including back-to-back goals just 7 seconds apart.

In fourth quarter, the speed of the game accelerated as Duke began to push offensively. Johns Hopkins goaltender Michael Gvozden was up to the task. He recorded 7 of his 17 saves in the fourth quarter, including one as time expired to seal the victory.

Hopkins was led by Senior Kevin Huntley who netted four goals in the contest.

=== Championship: Syracuse vs. Johns Hopkins ===
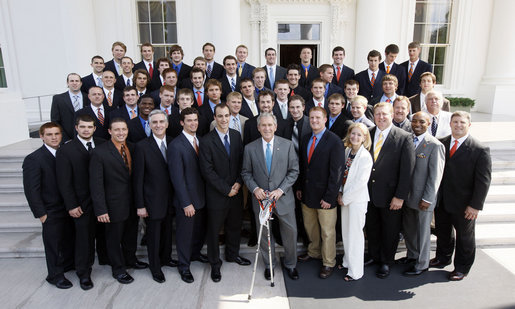
The Syracuse University Orange were honored at the White House by President of the United States George W. Bush in June 2008 for their winning the 2008 national championship.

	1	2	3	4	Total
SU	2	4	4	3	13
JHU	4	1	3	2	10

On Memorial Day, Monday May 26, Syracuse defeated Johns Hopkins in the national championship game 13–10 in front of 48,970 fans at Gillette Stadium. This game set the attendance record for the NCAA lacrosse championship game and for any NCAA outdoor championship. This marks the 10th victory in a national championship game for the Syracuse program. This is John Desko's, Syracuse's Head coach, fourth championship in his ten-year career at Syracuse.

The Orange were led by midfielder Dan Hardy with a team-high three goals, fifth-year Senior face-off specialist Danny Brennan who scored his first career goal, and attackman Mike Leveille, the tournament's Most Outstanding Player honoree and 2008 Tewaaraton Trophy winner, who recorded three points on one goal and two assists.

Syracuse goalkeeper John Galloway became the first freshman goaltender in NCAA history to record 16 wins in one season, and just the fourth to win an NCAA title.

Johns Hopkins' Paul Rabil played an outstanding game leading his team with career-high six goals and one assist in the losing effort. In addition, Blue Jay netminder Michael Gvozden made 20 saves, the most saves in a Championship game since Maryland's Brian Dougherty in 1995.

== Record by conference ==
Conference	# of Bids	Record	Win %	Quarterfinals	Final Four	Championship Game	Champions
Atlantic Coast Conference	4	5–4	.555	3	2	-	-
Great Western Lacrosse League	3	2–3	.400	2	-	-	-
Patriot League	2	1–2	.333	1	-	-	-
Independent (Hopkins & Syracuse)	2	7–1	.875	2	2	2	1
America East Conference	1	0–1	.000	-	-	-	-
Colonial Athletic Association	1	0–1	.000	-	-	-	-
Eastern College Athletic Conference	1	0–1	.000	-	-	-	-
Ivy League	1	0–1	.000	-	-	-	-
Metro Atlantic Athletic Conference	1	0–1	.000	-	-	-	-

== Tournament notes ==
- 97,194 fans attended the tournament surpassing the previous year's tournament record of 100,447.

== See also ==
- 2008 NCAA Division I women's lacrosse tournament
- 2008 NCAA Division II men's lacrosse tournament
- 2008 NCAA Division III men's lacrosse tournament
