= Richard F. Garber =

American college lacrosse coach

Biographical details
- Born: Harrisonburg, Virginia, U.S.
- Education: Springfield College

Playing career
- 1946–1950: Springfield College (football, baseball, basketball, lacrosse)

Coaching career (HC unless noted)
- 1955-1990: UMass

Head coaching record
- Overall: 300-142-3

Accomplishments and honors

Awards
- 9 NCAA tournament appearances (1976, 1977, 1979, 1981, 1986, 1987, 1988, 1989, 1990); 14 New England Championships (1963, 1969, 1974, 1976, 1977, 1978, 1979, 1981, 1984, 1986, 1987, 1988, 1989, 1990); 14x New England Coach of the Year; 3x USILA National Coach of the Year (1969, 1976, 1989); Inducted into National Lacrosse Hall of Fame (1985); Inducted into Intercollegiate Men's Lacrosse Coaches Association (IMLCA) Hall of Fame (2016); Springfield College Athletic Hall of Fame (1991); UMass Amherst Athletic Hall of Fame (1997)
- U.S. Lacrosse Hall of Fame; Inducted in 1985

Richard Franklin Garber (1928-1994) was an American college lacrosse coach and player. Spending his entire head coaching career coaching at the University of Massachusetts Amherst, Garber amassed 300 career wins, one of 26 college lacrosse coaches all-time to achieve at least 300 career wins. In 1985, he was inducted into the U.S. Lacrosse Hall of Fame.

Garber Field, the lacrosse field at UMass Amherst, is named in Garber's honor. Garber also played lacrosse collegiately at Springfield College.

== Playing career ==
=== Springfield ===
A graduate of the Springfield College class of 1950, Garber played varsity football, basketball, baseball, and lacrosse. Garber was inducted into the Springfield Athletic Hall of Fame in 1991.

Garber was captain of the Springfield lacrosse team and earned All-New England status in his last year at the school.

== Coaching career ==
=== UMass (1955-1990) ===
Garber coached the UMass Minutemen lacrosse team from 1955 until 1990. In 36 seasons as head coach of UMass, Garber led the team to a 300-142-3 record. Players under Garber at UMass went on to earn 80 All-America selections and 105 All-New England selections.

The UMass lacrosse team experienced great success under Garber's leadership, with nine NCAA tournament appearances and 14 New England championships (1963, 1969, 1974, 1976, 1977, 1978, 1979, 1981, 1984, 1986, 1987, 1988, 1989, 1990). UMass qualified for the NCAA tournament in 1976, 1977, 1979, 1981, 1986, 1987, 1988, 1989, and 1990 with Garber as the head coach. Garber also led UMass to the USILA Tournament in 1972 and 1973.

At the 1986 NCAA tournament, Garber helped UMass earn its first-ever NCAA tournament win, 16-6 over New Hampshire in the first round. Garber also earned an NCAA tournament win at 1989 NCAA tournament, 16-7 over Cornell in the first round.

Garber was a 3x USILA National Coach of the Year in 1969, 1976, and 1989. Regionally, Garber was a 14-time New England Coach of the Year.
