= Mike Pressler =

American lacrosse coach (born 1960)

Current position
- Title: Head coach
- Team: Atlas LC
- Conference: PLL

Biographical details
- Born: February 27, 1960 (age 66); Wilton, Connecticut, U.S.

Playing career
- 1979–1982: Washington and Lee

Coaching career (HC unless noted)
- 1983: VMI
- 1984–1985: Army (assistant)
- 1986–1990: Ohio Wesleyan
- 1991–2006: Duke
- 2007–2022: Bryant

Head coaching record
- Overall: 377–198 (college)

Accomplishments and honors

Championships
- F. Morris Touchstone Award (2005); PLL Coach of the Year (2024)

Mike Pressler (born February 27, 1960) is an American lacrosse coach who is currently the head coach and general manager of Atlas Lacrosse Club of the Premier Lacrosse League as well as the varsity head coach for Highland Park High School's lacrosse team (Highland Park, TX). He was previously the head coach of the Bryant Bulldogs from 2007 until his retirement after the 2022 season. He served as the head coach of the Duke Blue Devils for 16 seasons until he was forced to resign during the Duke lacrosse case in 2006. He received the F. Morris Touchstone Award for the men's college lacrosse coach of the year in 2005. In 2010, he coached the United States men's national lacrosse team to a gold medal.

== Career ==
Pressler attended Wilton High School, then Washington & Lee University, graduating in 1982. He was an outstanding lacrosse and football player, a four-year starter in both sports.

Pressler was the head coach at Virginia Military Institute for one year before leaving to serve as an assistant coach at the United States Military Academy under the tutelage of his former coach, Jack Emmer.

After West Point, Pressler was the head coach at Ohio Wesleyan University (OWU). In October 2007, he was inducted into the Ohio Wesleyan University Hall of Fame. During his 5-year tenure at OWU from 1986 through 1990, Pressler amassed a 69–16 record, four NCAC championships, five visits to the NCAA Division III semi-finals, three NCAA Division III Championship game appearances, 29 All-American selections, and five NCAA Division III players of the year. His contributions to the OWU lacrosse program made him the winningest coach (.812) in OWU's over 50-year lacrosse history.

Pressler was hired by Bryant University to lead their lacrosse team in 2007. In June 2022, Pressler announced his retirement from coaching.

After his retirement, Pressler was announced as the head coach for Highland Park High School's lacrosse program. In his first season at the helm, he led the Scots to a Texas High School Lacrosse League Class AA state championship.

== Duke ==
Pressler became head coach of the Duke Blue Devils in 1991. Over 16 seasons he compiled a 153–82 record at Duke, winning the Atlantic Coast Conference championship three times and leading his team to 10 NCAA Division I tournament appearances as well as the men's national championship game in 2005. Pressler was voted ACC Coach of the Year three times and also was honored as the USILA National Coach of the Year in 2005.

=== Duke lacrosse rape hoax ===
He was fired in 2006 in the wake of allegations of rape against three athletes in the program that proved to be baseless. Pressler's firing was publicly portrayed by Duke as a resignation, which gave rise to the implication that the coach resigned due to the students' presumed guilt. Pressler stated that the players were innocent of the rape allegations and argued that the lacrosse season should not be canceled until the DNA test results were returned. Pressler has written (with co-author Don Yaeger) a book giving his view of the incident, It's Not About the Truth: The Untold Story of the Duke Lacrosse Rape Case and the Lives It Shattered.

Pressler demanded compensation from Duke for wrongful termination. In early June 2007, Pressler and Duke agreed upon a financial settlement for an undisclosed amount.

==== Lawsuit ====
In October 2007, Pressler filed suit against Duke and Duke Vice-President for Public Affairs John Burness, alleging the university violated the terms of its confidential settlement with Pressler. Pressler asserted that Duke broke the terms of the settlement because he was allegedly slandered by Duke Vice-President John Burness, who claimed the difference between Pressler and his successor as lacrosse coach was "night and day." The suit sought to void the settlement and pursue damages in a trial rather than by arbitration, as specified in his contract.

The trial judge ruled for Pressler's claims, which was upheld by the Court of Appeals on September 1, 2009. Pressler's obligation to submit his claims to arbitration was voided by the June settlement. Pressler was free to proceed with his suit, including discovery. On March 31, 2010, the final day before discovery would start, Duke and Burness settled with Pressler. Although terms of the settlement were not disclosed, Duke issued an apology.

== Head coaching record ==
=== College ===
Record table
Season	Team	Overall	Conference	Standing	Postseason
VMI Keydets (Independent) (1983–1983)
1983	VMI	7–4			
VMI:		7–4 (.636)			
Ohio Wesleyan Battling Bishops (North Coast Athletic Conference) (1986–1990)
1986	Ohio Wesleyan	12–4	3–1	2nd	NCAA D3 Semifinals
1987	Ohio Wesleyan	14–3	4–0	1st	NCAA D3 Runner-up
1988	Ohio Wesleyan	15–2	4–0	1st	NCAA D3 Runner-up
1989	Ohio Wesleyan	13–4	4–0	1st	NCAA D3 Runner-up
1990	Ohio Wesleyan	15–3	5–0	1st	NCAA D3 Semifinals
Ohio Wesleyan:		69–16 (.812)	20–1 (.952)		
Duke Blue Devils (Atlantic Coast Conference) (1991–2006)
1991	Duke	7–5	0–3	4th	
1992	Duke	7–7	1–2	3rd	NCAA First Round
1993	Duke	9–5	1–2	3rd	
1994	Duke	10–6	1–2	T-3rd	NCAA Quarterfinals
1995	Duke	12–4	0–3	4th	NCAA First Round
1996	Duke	6–6	1–2	T-3rd	
1997	Duke	12–4	2–1	2nd	NCAA Semifinals
1998	Duke	11–4	1–2	3rd	NCAA Quarterfinals
1999	Duke	13–3	2–1	T-1st	NCAA First Round
2000	Duke	11–5	2–1	2nd	NCAA Quarterfinals
2001	Duke	11–6	2–1	T-1st	NCAA First Round
2002	Duke	8–7	1–2	T-3rd	NCAA Quarterfinals
2003	Duke	8–7	0–3	4th	
2004	Duke	5–8	0–3	4th	
2005	Duke	17–3	3–0	1st	NCAA Runner-up
2006	Duke	6–2	1–1	3rd	Season canceled after 8 games.
Duke:		153–82 (.651)	18–29 (.383)		
Bryant Bulldogs (Northeast-10 Conference) (2007–2008)
2007	Bryant	11–4	9–0	1st	
2008	Bryant	14–4	9–1	2nd	NCAA D2 Semifinals
Bryant Bulldogs (Independent) (2009–2010)
2009	Bryant	10–5			
2010	Bryant	12–5			
Bryant Bulldogs (Northeast) (2011–present)
2011	Bryant	8–9	3–2	T-3rd	
2012	Bryant	14–4	4–1	2nd	
2013	Bryant	8–11	4–1	1st	NCAA First Round
2014	Bryant	16–5	5–1	2nd	NCAA Quarterfinals
2015	Bryant	8–10	4–2	T–2nd	NCAA Play-in
2016	Bryant	10–5	5–1	T–1st	
2017	Bryant	11–8	4–2	T–2nd	NCAA First Round
2018	Bryant	8–7	5–1	2nd	
2019	Bryant	3–11	1–5	6th	
2020	Bryant	3–4	0–0		
2021	Bryant	9–4	5–2	3rd	NCAA First Round
Bryant:		148–96 (.607)	58–19 (.753)		
Total:		377–198 (.656)			
National champion Postseason invitational champion Conference regular season champion Conference regular season and conference tournament champion Division regular season champion Division regular season and conference tournament champion Conference tournament champion

== See also ==
- List of college men's lacrosse career coaching wins leaders
