= F. Morris Touchstone =

American lacrosse coach

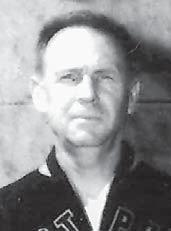

Biographical details
- Born: October 2, 1897; Baltimore, Maryland
- Died: November 7, 1957 (aged 60); West Point, New York

Playing career
- ?: Mt. Washington Club

Coaching career (HC unless noted)
- 1924–1927: Yale
- 1928–1957: Army

Head coaching record
- Overall: 233–81–5

Francis Morris Touchstone (October 2, 1897 – November 7, 1957) was an American lacrosse coach. He served for 29 years as the head coach for the United States Military Academy's men's lacrosse team and is their all-time winningest coach by number of wins. While at Army, he led the Cadets to three national championships and 42 of his players received first-team All-American honors. Shortly after his death he was inducted into the National Lacrosse Hall of Fame. The Touchstone Memorial Award for the men's college lacrosse coach of the year was established in his honor.

== Biography ==
Touchstone was a native of Baltimore, Maryland, and under the guidance of coach Bill Schmeisser, he played as a member of the Mount Washington Lacrosse Club based in the city's neighborhood of the same name. From 1920 to 1923, he ran the club's summer camp. In 1924, Yale University hired Touchstone as the head coach for their varsity lacrosse, soccer, and freshman gymnastics teams.

After success at Yale, he took over the Army lacrosse team at the United States Military Academy in September 1928. Touchstone remained in that position until his death 29 years later. During that time, he compiled the most wins of any Army lacrosse coach, with a record of 214–73–4 (0.743). Of Army's total of 82 first-team All-Americans, 42 played under Touchstone. He led the Cadets to back-to-back national championships, outright in 1944 and shared with Navy in 1945. Army also won a share of a third national title in 1951 alongside Princeton. As a member of the Military Academy staff, Touchstone held the rank of captain.

A year before his death, Sports Illustrated asked Touchstone, among other authorities, to compare American football and lacrosse. He said in response:

"Both appeal to the athlete who enjoys rugged competition. Both are highly developed team efforts, but the skills of the two differ. In football, the emphasis is on blocking and tackling. In lacrosse, ball handling with the stick, dodging and accurate shooting are vital."

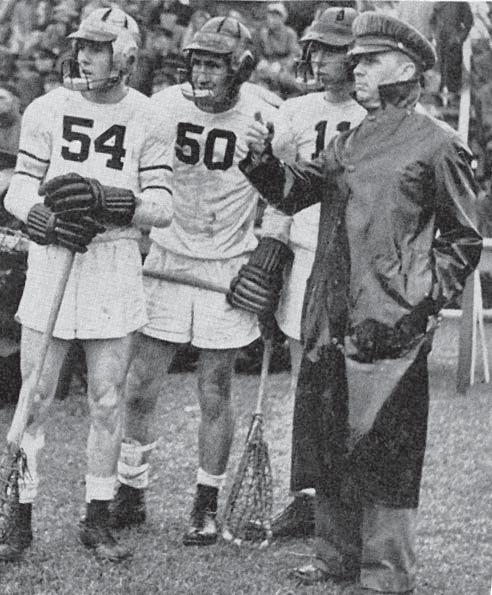
Touchstone gives instructions to some of his players at Army.

He served tenures as a member of numerous lacrosse-related governing bodies including the Rules Committee (1934–1937), the All-American Committee (1939–1950), the Executive Board (1939–1940), the Publicity Committee (1943–1944), and the NCAA Lacrosse Rules Committee (1946). From 1951 to 1957, he acted as an advisor to the All-American Committee, and from 1953 to 1955, Touchstone served as the first president of the Lacrosse Coaches Association. With the encouragement of Penn State lacrosse coach Glenn Thiel, Touchstone was instrumental in organizing the National Lacrosse Hall of Fame, and he served as its first chairman from 1954 until his death three years later. His son Stanford Touchstone, an Army cadet, played for him at West Point in the early 1950s.

Touchstone was survived by his wife Lillian, son Stanford Morris Touchstone, his married daughter Anne Combs Brinkerhoff, wife of Defense Department’s John Brinkerhoff, and his mother. He was buried at the West Point Cemetery on November 14, 1957.
