= 2002 NCAA Division I men's lacrosse tournament =

- Dates: May 11–27, 2002
- Teams: 12
- Finals site: Rutgers Stadium; Piscataway, New Jersey
- Champions: Syracuse (7th title)
- Runner-up: Princeton (8th title game)
- Semifinalists: Johns Hopkins (23rd Final Four); Virginia (15th Final Four)
- Winning coach: John Desko (2nd title)
- MOP: Michael Powell, Syracuse
- Attendance: 19,706 finals 60,968 total
- Top scorer: Michael Powell, Syracuse (14 goals)

The 2002 NCAA Division I lacrosse tournament was the 32nd annual tournament hosted by the National Collegiate Athletic Association to determine the team champion of men's college lacrosse among its Division I programs, held at the end of the 2002 NCAA Division I men's lacrosse season.

Syracuse defeated Princeton in the final, 13–12. The Orangemen's victory—for their record-tying seventh official championship and second in three years—was led by Michael Powell, who had four goals and three assists. The game was a rematch of the 2001 championship game, which was won by Princeton.

The championship game was played at Rutgers Stadium at Rutgers University in Piscataway, New Jersey, with 19,706 fans in attendance. This was the final championship played on a college campus before later tournament finals were moved to larger National Football League venues.

== Overview ==
For Princeton, the loss snapped a 12-game tournament win streak in games decided by one goal. The Tigers' only previous tournament loss by one goal was in 1991, prior to the first of Princeton's six national titles.

Michael Powell, who was named the tournament most outstanding player and later would be named national player of the year, scored the game-winner with 11:35 left in the championship game. Syracuse won three straight one-goal games in the tournament, and the win gave head coach John Desko his second championship in four years.

All-Tournament Team: Michael Powell, Solomon Bliss, John Glatzel, Tom Hardy and Jay Pfeifer of Syracuse; Damien Davis, Brad Dumont and B.J. Prager of Princeton; Adam Doneger of Johns Hopkins; and Johnny Christmas of Virginia.

== Bracket ==
First Round; May 11–12, 2002
8	Massachusetts	14
Fairfield	7
5	Georgetown	12
Manhattan	7
6	Cornell	12
Stony Brook	3
7	Duke	22
Hobart	6

Quarterfinals; May 18–19, 2002
8	Massachusetts	12
1	Johns Hopkins	13*
4	Princeton	14
5	Georgetown	13
6	Cornell	10
3	Virginia	11
2	Syracuse	10
7	Duke	9

Semifinals; May 25, 2002
1	Johns Hopkins	9
4	Princeton	11
3	Virginia	11
2	Syracuse	12**

Final; May 27, 2002
4	Princeton	12
2	Syracuse	13

- * = Overtime

== See also ==
- 2002 NCAA Division I women's lacrosse tournament
- 2002 NCAA Division II men's lacrosse tournament
- 2002 NCAA Division III men's lacrosse tournament
