= Duke Blue Devils men's lacrosse =

Lacrosse team of Duke University

- Founded: 1938; 88 years ago
- University: Duke University
- Head coach: John Danowski (since 2006 season)
- Stadium: Koskinen Stadium (capacity: 7,000)
- Location: Durham, North Carolina
- Conference: Atlantic Coast Conference
- Nickname: Blue Devils
- Colors: Duke blue and white

NCAA Tournament championships
- 2010, 2013, 2014

NCAA Tournament Runner-Up
- 2005, 2007, 2018, 2023

NCAA Tournament Final Fours
- 1997, 2005, 2007, 2008, 2009, 2010, 2011, 2012, 2013, 2014, 2018, 2019, 2021, 2023, 2026

NCAA Tournament Quarterfinals
- 1994, 1997, 2000, 2002, 2005, 2007, 2008, 2009, 2010, 2011, 2012, 2013, 2014, 2017, 2018, 2019, 2021, 2023, 2024, 2026

NCAA Tournament appearances
- 1992, 1994, 1995, 1997, 1998, 1999, 2000, 2001, 2002, 2005, 2007, 2008, 2009, 2010, 2011, 2012, 2013, 2014, 2015, 2016, 2017, 2018, 2019, 2021, 2023, 2024, 2025, 2026

Conference Tournament championships
- 1995, 2001, 2002, 2007, 2008, 2009, 2012

Conference regular season championships
- 1939, 1946, 1954, 1999, 2001, 2005, 2007, 2008, 2009, 2011, 2012, 2013, 2014, 2021, 2023

The Duke Blue Devils men's lacrosse team represents Duke University in National Collegiate Athletic Association (NCAA) Division I men's lacrosse. Duke currently competes as a member of the Atlantic Coast Conference (ACC) and plays its home games at Koskinen Stadium in Durham, North Carolina. The principal rivalry of Duke is their all-sports nemesis North Carolina.

== Roster ==
As of Jul 2026

No.		Position	Player
1	(United States)	GK	Patrick Jameison
2	(United States)	AT	Kyle Colsey
3	(United States)	DF	Jack Kieger
4	(United States)	AT	Austin Hicks
5	(United States)	DF	Henry Bard
6	(United States)	MF	Luke Warrington
7	(United States)	MF	Tomas Delgado
8	(United States)	MF	Jack Pappendick
9	(United States)	FO	Luke Engelke
11	(United States)	AT	Michael Ortlieb
12	(United States)	MF	Ian Dykes
13	(United States)	DF	Nikolas Menendez
14	(United States)	GK	Henry Blake
15	(United States)	MF	Max Sloat
17	(United States)	MF	Colin McLane
19	(United States)	MF	Benn Johnston
20	(United States)	AT	Thomas Mencke
21	(United States)	SSDM	Stephen Finnell
23	(United States)	SSDM	Aidan Maguire
24	(United States)	MF	Jackson Spells
25	(United States)	AT	Petey Malitas
26	(United States)	AT	Owen Gaffney

No.		Position	Player
27	(United States)	DF	Charlie Johnson
28	(United States)	MF	Will Tantillo
30	(United States)	MF	Connor Nolen
31	(United States)	AT	Owen Mears
32	(United States)	AT	Sam Blake
33	(United States)	FO	Ben McCarthy
36	(United States)	LSM	Luke Christmas
37	(United States)	LSM	Mac Christmas
38	(United States)	DF	Preston Whitehurst
39	(United States)	DF	Zach Jepson
41	(United States)	FO	Cal Girard
43	(United States)	LSM	Vincent Fowler
44	(United States)	GK	Buck Cunningham
46	(United States)	AT	Axel Blom
48	(United States)	FO	Matthew Sardis
49	(United States)	GK	Marcos Ramos
51	(United States)	AT	Brady Scioletti
55	(United States)	AT	Liam Kershis
56	(United States)	DF	Brendan Fulham
66	(United States)	GK	Cam Taylor
77	(United States)	MF	Anthony Drago
91	(United States)	LSM	Will Pedicano

== Coaching Staff ==
Position	Staff
Athletic director	(United States) Nina King
Head Coach	(United States) John Danowski
Associative Head Coach	(United States) Matt Danowski
Assistant Coach	(United States) Ron Caputo
Assistant Coach	(United States) Kevin Unterstein

== History ==
The first lacrosse game played by Duke took place on April 9, 1938, when the Blue Devils traveled to meet their nearby rivals, North Carolina, which itself had just formed a team the year prior. Duke won that contest, 2–1. The first home game occurred a week later when they hosted Syracuse, who beat the Blue Devils, 17–5. Duke finished the season with a 2–5 record, with their second win also over North Carolina, this time in Durham. The following season, the Blue Devils compiled a 7–1 mark and secured the Dixie Lacrosse League championship.

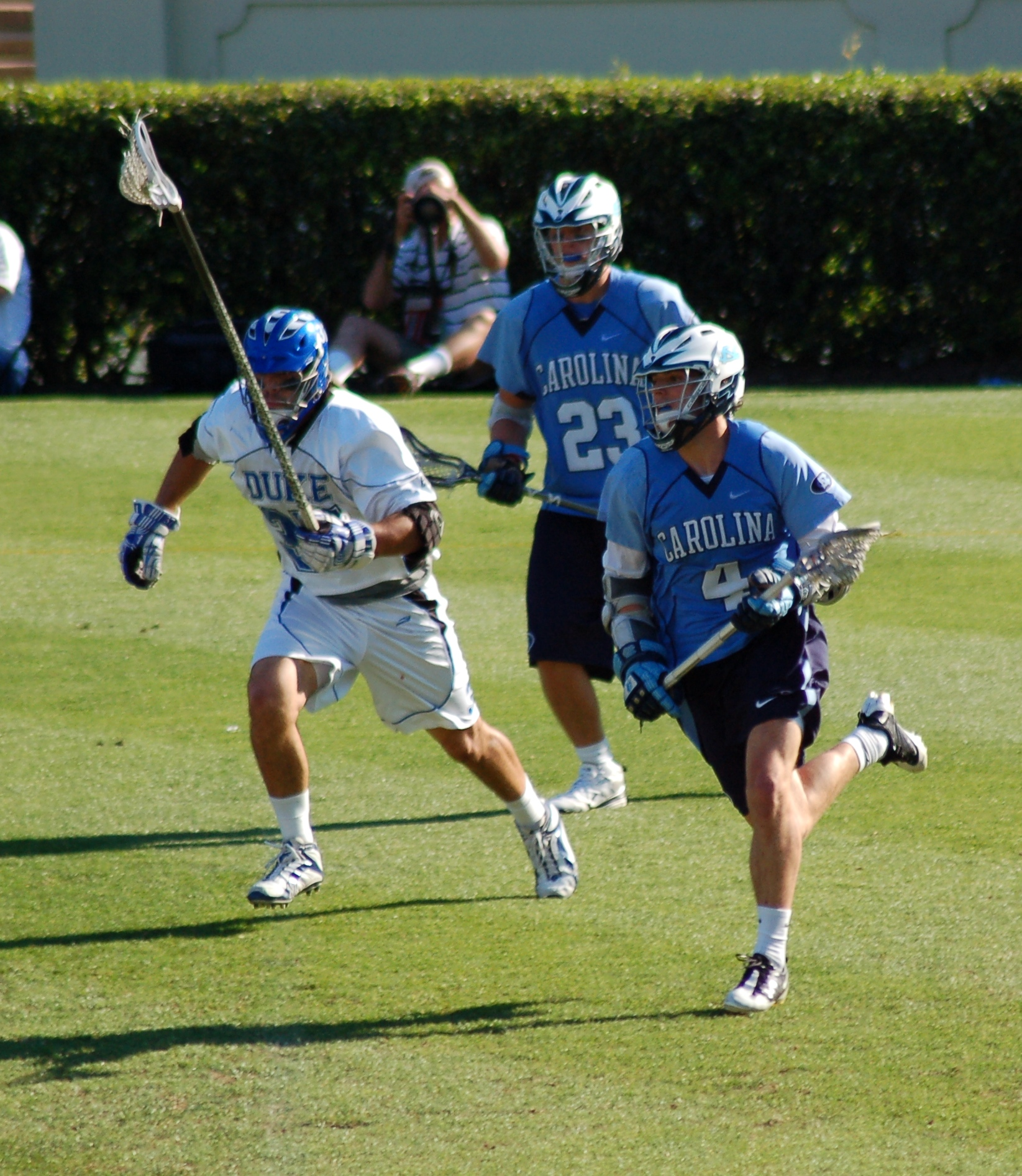
Duke defeated North Carolina in the 2009 ACC tournament final.

Ray Brown became Duke's first lacrosse All-American in 1940 and was honored as such again the following year. In 1946, Duke opened the season with an upset over national power Maryland in College Park, 12–4. Despite finishing the season with a 2–3 record, the Blue Devils were awarded the Southern Lacrosse Association championship.

The 1951 team is often regarded as one of Duke's most successful pre-NCAA teams. The Blue Devils routed conference opponent Washington & Lee, 26–8. They also scored victories against powerhouses, beating Navy, 17–6, and Johns Hopkins, 9–7. The lone loss was by a one-goal margin and came against Virginia. Duke finished the season with a 6–1 record.

The newly formed Atlantic Coast Conference (ACC) sanctioned lacrosse in 1954, and Duke captured the league's first title after posting a 7–1–1 season. Starting the following year, however, the Blue Devils entered a twelve-year slump where they compiled a combined 17–67 record with no winning seasons. In 1967, Roy Skinner and Bruce Corrie took over as co-head coaches and immediately reversed the team's fortunes, posting a 7–4 record that season and finishing second in the ACC. In 1971, Corrie became the sole coach after Skinner retired.

Mike Pressler was hired as head coach in 1991, and the following season Duke made its first NCAA tournament appearance. In 1994, the Blue Devils posted their first tournament win, which was also their first victory against Maryland in Durham since 1954. They were then edged, 12–11, in the quarterfinals by Syracuse. The next year, Duke won its first ACC tournament, and in the process became the first number-four seed to do so. Two years later, they advanced to the Final Four. Duke won consecutive ACC tournaments in 2001 and 2002, and advanced to the 2005 NCAA final before losing to Johns Hopkins, 9–8. The 2006 season was cut short when several Duke players were falsely accused of rape. As a result of the incident, Duke forced Pressler to resign as head coach, and the NCAA granted the players an extra season of eligibility.

John Danowski replaced Pressler, and in his first season in 2007, he led the Blue Devils to the ACC championship and a return to the NCAA title game. Duke again lost to Johns Hopkins by one goal, 12–11. In 2010, Duke returned to the final, where it defeated Notre Dame, 6–5 in overtime, to capture its first NCAA championship.

In the 2013 season, Duke defeated Syracuse 16–10 to win their second NCAA lacrosse championship.

In the 2014 season, Duke defeated Notre Dame 11–9 to win their third NCAA lacrosse championship.

== Season results ==
The following is a list of Duke's results by season as an NCAA Division I program:

Season	Coach	Overall	Conference	Standing	Postseason
Bruce Corrie (Atlantic Coast Conference) (1967–1975)
1971	Bruce Corrie	7–7	0–1	4th	
1972	Bruce Corrie	8–6	0–2	4th	
1973	Bruce Corrie	7–8	1–3	4th	
1974	Bruce Corrie	8–6	1–3	4th	
1975	Bruce Corrie	3–10	1–2	4th	
Bruce Corrie:		52–62 (.456)	4–16 (.200)		
John Epsey (Atlantic Coast Conference) (1976–1981)
1976	John Epsey	5–7	1–2	4th	
1977	John Epsey	7–6	0–3	5th	
1978	John Epsey	9–6	0–4	5th	
1979	John Epsey	7–8	0–4	5th	
1980	John Epsey	4–9	0–4	5th	
1981	John Epsey	3–9	0–4	5th	
John Epsey:		35–45 (.438)	1–21 (.045)		
Tony Cullen (Atlantic Coast Conference) (1982–1990)
1982	Tony Cullen	6–7	0–4	5th	
1983	Tony Cullen	7–7	0–3	4th	
1984	Tony Cullen	5–9	0–3	4th	
1985	Tony Cullen	8–7	0–3	4th	
1986	Tony Cullen	11–4	0–3	4th	
1987	Tony Cullen	11–3	2–1	2nd	
1988	Tony Cullen	8–4	0–3	4th	
1989	Tony Cullen	9–6	0–3	4th	
1990	Tony Cullen	6–7	0–3	4th	
Tony Cullen:		71–54 (.568)	2–26 (.071)		
Mike Pressler (Atlantic Coast Conference) (1991–2006)
1991	Mike Pressler	7–5	0–3	4th	
1992	Mike Pressler	7–7	1–2	3rd	NCAA Division I First Round
1993	Mike Pressler	9–5	1–2	3rd	
1994	Mike Pressler	10–6	1–2	T–3rd	NCAA Division I Quarterfinals
1995	Mike Pressler	12–4	0–3	4th	NCAA Division I First Round
1996	Mike Pressler	6–6	1–2	T–3rd	
1997	Mike Pressler	12–4	2–1	2nd	NCAA Division I Final Four
1998	Mike Pressler	11–4	1–2	3rd	NCAA Division I Quarterfinals
1999	Mike Pressler	13–3	2–1	T–1st	NCAA Division I Quarterfinals
2000	Mike Pressler	11–5	2–1	2nd	NCAA Division I Quarterfinals
2001	Mike Pressler	11–6	2–1	T–1st	NCAA Division I First Round
2002	Mike Pressler	8–7	1–2	T–2nd	NCAA Division I Quarterfinals
2003	Mike Pressler	8–7	0–3	4th	
2004	Mike Pressler	5–8	0–3	4th	
2005	Mike Pressler	17–3	3–0	1st	NCAA Division I Runner-Up
2006	Mike Pressler	6–2	1–1	4th	†
Mike Pressler:		153–82 (.651)	18–29 (.383)		
John Danowski (Atlantic Coast Conference) (2007–Present)
2007	John Danowski	17–3	3–0	1st	NCAA Division I Runner-Up
2008	John Danowski	18–2	3–0	1st	NCAA Division I Final Four
2009	John Danowski	15–4	2–1	T–1st	NCAA Division I Final Four
2010	John Danowski	16–4	1–2	T–3rd	NCAA Division I Champion
2011	John Danowski	14–6	3–0	1st	NCAA Division I Final Four
2012	John Danowski	15–5	2–1	T–1st	NCAA Division I Final Four
2013	John Danowski	16–5	2–1	T–1st	NCAA Division I Champion
2014	John Danowski	17–3	4–1	T–1st	NCAA Division I Champion
2015	John Danowski	12–6	1–3	4th	NCAA Division I First Round
2016	John Danowski	11–8	2–2	T–3rd	NCAA Division I First Round
2017	John Danowski	13–5	3–1	2nd	NCAA Division I Quarterfinals
2018	John Danowski	16–4	3–1	2nd	NCAA Division I Runner-Up
2019	John Danowski	13–5	2–2	T–2nd	NCAA Division I Final Four
2020	John Danowski	6–2	0–0	††	††
2021	John Danowski	14–3	4–2	T–1st	NCAA Division I Final Four
2022	John Danowski	11–6	3–3	3rd	
2023	John Danowski	16–3	5–1	1st	NCAA Division I Runner–Up
2024	John Danowski	13–6	1–3	T–3rd	NCAA Division I Quarterfinals
2025	John Danowski	12–6	2–2	T–3rd	NCAA Division I First Round
2026	John Danowski	11–5	1–3	5th	NCAA Division I Final Four
John Danowski:		276–91 (.752)	47–29 (.618)		
Total:		665–453–1 (.595)			
National champion Postseason invitational champion Conference regular season champion Conference regular season and conference tournament champion Division regular season champion Division regular season and conference tournament champion Conference tournament champion

†Remainder of 2006 season cancelled due to the Duke lacrosse case

††NCAA canceled 2020 collegiate activities due to the COVID-19 virus.

== Alumni in the Premier Lacrosse League (11) ==
Year Drafted	Name	Position	Height	Weight	Drafted By	Draft Pick	Current Team	All Star	Accolades
2012	Mike Manley	Defense	6'2	225	Rochester Rattlers (MLL)	1st round (3rd overall)	Chrome LC	None	None
2012	CJ Costabile	LSM	6'1	197	Chesapeake Bayhawks (MLL)	1st round (5th overall)	Chaos LC	2x 2019, 2022	None
2015	Will Haus	D Midfield	6'0	190	Charlotte Hounds (MLL)	1st round (3rd overall)	Chrome LC	None	None
2016	Myles Jones	Midfield	6'5	260	Atlanta Blaze (MLL)	1st round (1st overall)	Redwoods LC	2x All Star ('19,'21)	None
2018	Justin Guterding	Attack	6'0	190	Ohio Machine (MLL)	1st round (9th overall)	Whipsnakes LC	1x All Star ('19)	None
2019	Brad Smith	Midfield	6'3	210	Whipsnakes LC	2nd round (9th overall)	Whipsnakes LC	None	None
2019	Cade Van Raaphorst	Defense	6'1	215	Atlas LC	2nd round (11th overall)	Atlas LC	None	None
2021	JT Giles-Harris	Defense	5'10	200	Chrome LC	1st round (3rd overall)	Chrome LC	None	None
2021	Michael Sowers	Attack	5'9	165	Waterdogs LC	1st round (2nd overall)	Waterdogs LC	None	None
2022	Nakeie Montgomery	Midfield	5'11	200	Redwoods LC	3rd round (19th overall)	Redwoods LC	None	None
2022	Joe Robertson	Attack	5'11	190	Undrafted	Undrafted	Redwoods LC	None	None

== See also ==
- Duke lacrosse case
- Duke–North Carolina lacrosse rivalry
