= Sports in Baltimore =

Baltimore, Maryland, has a history of professional sports teams across various eras. Local sports fans, including figures like the late Wild Bill Hagy, have historically supported both the city's franchises and athletes associated with the area.

Among other sports, Baltimore is also known for horse racing. The Preakness Stakes is a 1-3/16 mile (1.91 km) American Grade I stakes race for three-year-old thoroughbred horses, held on the third Saturday in May each year at Pimlico Race Course in Baltimore. The Preakness Stakes has been termed "The Run for the Black-Eyed Susans" because a blanket of Black-eyed Susans (Rudbeckia hirta, the state flower of Maryland) is traditionally placed around the winner's neck. The Preakness is the second leg in American thoroughbred racing's Triple Crown series and almost always attracts the Kentucky Derby winner, and some of the other horses that ran in the Derby.

== Major professional league teams ==
- Baltimore Orioles – Major League Baseball (since 1954)
- Baltimore Ravens – National Football League (since 1996)

== Other professional and top tier amateur teams ==
- Baltimore Blast – Major Arena Soccer League (since 1992)
- Baltimore Nighthawks – Independent Women's Football League (since 2008)
- Baltimore Dockers – United States Australian Football League (since 2017)
- Maryland Whipsnakes – Premier Lacrosse League (since 2024)
- Baltimore Rhythm – 94x50 League (since 2026)
- Baltimore Starlings — UpShot League (starting 2027)

Baltimore Bohemians, a USL PDL soccer franchise founded in 2011, finished second in the Mid-Atlantic division in 2013, clinching a playoff berth in their second season. The Bohemians also secured a U.S. Open Cup berth and led the entire 62-team PDL in scoring with 42 league goals. They went on hiatus as of the 2017 season.

In 2018, FC Baltimore began play in the National Premier Soccer League out of the Community College of Baltimore County's Essex Stadium. The team won the Mid-Atlantic Conference in its inaugural season, including the largest home victory of the year with a 13–0 win over Legacy 76, and reached the 2018 NPSL National Playoffs as a wildcard team. In 2019, they finished second in the NPSL Mid-Atlantic Division and fell to eventual league champions New York Cosmos B in the Northeast Region Final. Baltimore City F.C. is an Eastern Premier Soccer League club that plays since 2023 at Utz Field in Patterson Park.

Baltimore Blast, a franchise of the Major Arena Soccer League, has been playing at the 1st Mariner Arena since 1992. Originally known as Baltimore Spirit, the team changed its name in 1998. The current name was previously used by another indoor soccer team that played in Baltimore from 1980 to 1992, winning a MISL title in 1984. Since joining the MISL in 2001, the Baltimore Blast have won nine league championships: 2002, 2003, 2005, 2007, 2008, 2012, 2016, 2017 and 2018. The Blast joined the MASL in 2014 upon closure of the MISL. The Baltimore Kings, a Baltimore Blast affiliate, joined MASL 3 in 2021 to begin play in 2022.

Baltimore has two women's American football teams: the Baltimore Burn (founded 2001) and the Baltimore Nighthawks (founded 2007). Both teams play at Art Modell Field.

== Defunct or relocated teams ==
Each sport's teams are listed in sequential order by starting year in Baltimore.

=== Baseball ===
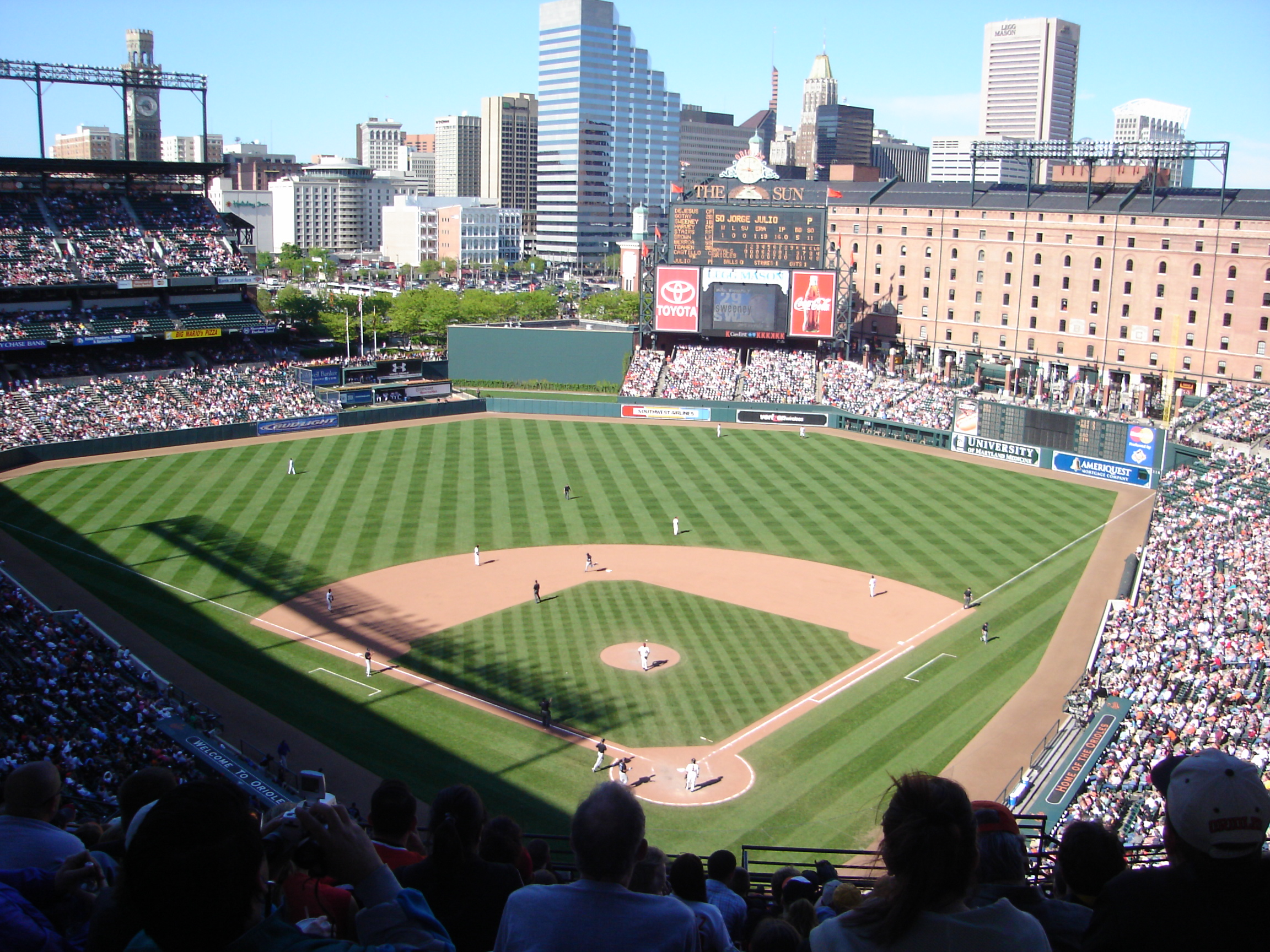
Oriole Park at Camden Yards

- Baltimore Canaries/Yellow Stockings – National Association (1872–1874)
- Baltimore Orioles (19th century) – American Association/National League (1882–1899)
- Baltimore Monumentals – Union Association (1884)
- Baltimore Orioles – American League (1901–1902); moved to New York and became the Highlanders and eventually the New York Yankees
- Baltimore Orioles – Eastern/International League (1903–1914, 1916–1953)
- Baltimore Terrapins – Federal League (1914–1915)
- Baltimore Black Sox – Eastern Colored League (1923–1928)
- Baltimore Elite Giants – Negro National League (the second) (1938–1948)

=== Football ===
- Baltimore Colts – All-America Football Conference/NFL (1947–50)
- Baltimore Colts – National Football League (1953–83)
- Baltimore Stars – United States Football League (1985)
- Baltimore Stallions – Canadian Football League (1994–95)
- Baltimore Blackbirds – American Indoor Football Association (2007)
- Baltimore Mariners – American Indoor Football Association (2008–10)
- Baltimore Brigade – Arena Football League (2017–19)

The Baltimore Stallions was an expansion professional football team that joined the Canadian Football League in 1994. It remained in Baltimore for two seasons before relocating to Montreal after the 1995 season to become the Montreal Alouettes. While playing for Baltimore, the team posted the best two season starts of any CFL expansion team ever, advancing to the Grey Cup in both seasons. In its final season in Baltimore, the Stallions became the only U.S.-based CFL team to win the Grey Cup, upsetting the heavily favored Calgary Stampeders.

The Baltimore Mariners, a franchise of the American Indoor Football Association, played at the 1st Mariner Arena from 2008 to 2010. After winning the AIFA championship to cap an undefeated season in 2010, the team folded over charges that owner Dwayne Wells purchased the franchise with embezzled funds.

=== Basketball ===
- Baltimore Bullets (1944–1954) – American Basketball League (1944–47) and National Basketball Association (1947–1954)
- Baltimore Bullets – National Basketball Association (1963–73); played 35 "home" games in Baltimore as the Washington Bullets (1989–1997)
- Baltimore Claws – American Basketball Association (1975)
- Baltimore Lightning – Continental Basketball Association (1985–86); played games at Towson Center at Towson University
- Baltimore Bayrunners – International Basketball League (1999–2000)
- Baltimore Pearls – American Basketball Association (2005–07)
- Baltimore Shuckers – American Professional Basketball League (2011–2016), Central Basketball Association (2017–2020)

=== Soccer ===
- Baltimore Bays – North American Soccer League (1967–69)
- Baltimore Comets – North American Soccer League (1974–76)
- Baltimore Blast – Major Indoor Soccer League (1980–1992)
- Baltimore Blast – National Professional Soccer League (1992–2001), named Baltimore Spirit until 1998; Major Indoor Soccer League (2001–2008) and Major Indoor Soccer League (2008–14)
- Crystal Palace Baltimore – USL Second Division (2006–10)

=== Ice hockey ===
- Baltimore Hockey League (1896–1898)
- Baltimore Clippers – American/Eastern/Southern Hockey League (1962–1977)
- Baltimore Blades – World Hockey Association (1975)
- Baltimore Skipjacks – American/Atlantic Coast Hockey League (1981–1993) moved to Portland, Maine as the Pirates
- Baltimore Bandits – American Hockey League (1995–1997)

=== Softball ===
- Baltimore Monuments – American Professional Slo-Pitch League (APSPL) (1977)

=== Lacrosse ===
- Baltimore Thunder – Eagle Pro Box/National Lacrosse League (1987–1999) moved to Pittsburgh, then Washington, D.C.; now Colorado
- Baltimore Tribe – American Lacrosse League (1988) played at University of Maryland, Baltimore County in Catonsville for the 4 weeks the league existed
- Baltimore Bayhawks – Major League Lacrosse (2001–2006). Moved to the Washington, D.C. area in 2007; returned to the Baltimore Metropolitan Area in 2009 at Navy–Marine Corps Memorial Stadium in Annapolis. In that season, the team was still known as the Washington Bayhawks; in 2010, it adopted its current name of Chesapeake Bayhawks.

== Major league professional championships ==
=== Baltimore Orioles (MLB) ===
3 World Series titles

- 1966
- 1970
- 1983

=== Baltimore Orioles: 19th century (MLB) ===
2 pre–World Series titles

- 1896
- 1897

=== Baltimore Bullets (NBA) ===
1 NBA Finals title

- 1948

=== Baltimore Colts (NFL) ===
2 NFL championships (pre-Super Bowl)

- 1958
- 1959

1 Super Bowl title

- 1970 (V)

=== Baltimore Ravens (NFL) ===
2 Super Bowl titles

- 2000 (XXXV)
- 2012 (XLVII)

=== Baltimore Stallions (CFL) ===
1 Grey Cup title

- 1995

=== Baltimore Mariners (AIFA) ===
1 AIFA Championship Bowl title

- 2010 AIFA Championship Bowl IV

== College teams ==
=== Division I ===
In Baltimore City:

- Coppin State Eagles
- Johns Hopkins Blue Jays, competes in Division I for men's and women's lacrosse only
- Loyola Greyhounds
- Morgan State Bears

In Baltimore County:

- Towson Tigers, in Towson
- UMBC Retrievers, in Catonsville

=== Division III ===
In Baltimore City:

- Johns Hopkins Blue Jays
- Notre Dame Gators

In Baltimore County:

- Goucher Gophers, located in Towson
- Stevenson Mustangs, located in Owings Mills

== Events ==
- Army–Navy Game: 1924, 1944, 2000, 2007, 2014, 2016, 2025
- City-Poly football game: 1889–present
- Crab Bowl Classic (Maryland–Navy football game): 1932, 1951, 1958, 1959, 2005, 2010
- Day of Rivals, college lacrosse double-header: 2009–present
- Face-Off Classic, college lacrosse double-header: 2007–present
- NBA All-Star Game: 1969
- NCAA Division I men's lacrosse championship: 1975, 2003, 2004, 2007, 2010, 2011, 2014
- NCAA Division II men's lacrosse championship: 2003, 2004, 2007, 2010, 2011, 2014
- NCAA Division III men's lacrosse championship: 2003, 2004, 2007, 2010, 2011, 2014

== Lore and traditions ==
It is customary before a Baltimore Ravens game to tap the shoe of the statue of Johnny Unitas, Baltimore's star quarterback of the mid twentieth century while the Colts were still playing in the city, for good luck.

When the national anthem is played at an Orioles or Ravens game, the word "oh" is emphasized in the line "oh say does that star spangled banner yet wave" by the crowd to show allegiance to the Orioles using their nickname, the O's, while also honoring the fact that "The Star Spangled Banner" was written by Baltimorean Francis Scott Key at the Battle of Baltimore during the War of 1812. Some national onlookers regard this custom as disrespectful to the nation's anthem. Due to the Baltimore Orioles's large fanbase as they were the only baseball team in the Baltimore–Washington area from 1971 to 2005, the practice has also extended to Washington Commanders, Washington Nationals, Washington Capitals and Washington Wizards games (the Capitals being erroneously attributed to player Alexander Ovechkin) as well as events involving athletes from the Baltimore area.

Nicknames are widely used in Baltimore to refer to certain sports figures or moments. Several Orioles players of the modern era have earned themselves nicknames which have quickly become traditional, such as Chris Davis receiving the nickname "Crush Davis" following his record-setting 2013 season and Nelson Cruz, whose last named is chanted in an elongated fashion whenever he makes a big play at home. The 2012 postseason game between the Ravens and the Broncos has picked up several nicknames, such as the "Mile High Miracle", the "F-bomb", and the "Rocky Mountain Rainbow", each referring particularly to Joe Flacco's pass to Jacoby Jones for a Baltimore touchdown which led to a victory, eventually leading the Ravens to win Super Bowl XLVII.

When the Orioles are thrown into situations where they succeed spectacularly, especially when overcoming an adversarial situation, it is known by the Baltimore community as "Orioles Magic". This term was popularized by the local station WFBR when announcers reacted to Doug DeCinces' walk-off home run over the Detroit Tigers in 1979 by shouting "it might get out of here", followed by an eruption of fan cheering at Memorial Stadium.

Eating Esskay hot dogs and drinking National Bohemian beer at Baltimore sporting events, particularly at Orioles games, has become a long-lasting tradition. National Bohemian is commonly referred to as "Natty Boh" by venues and Baltimoreans, however no longer served at Oriole Park itself after a marketing dispute involving usage of the Orioles color likeness on cans initiated by owner Peter Angelos.

The term "Birdland" is commonly used to refer to the Baltimore area's fanbase for both the Ravens and the Orioles. MASN, the Orioles' broadcasting network, is commonly accredited with popularizing this term thanks to their promos.

The song "Seven Nation Army" was popularized in Baltimore as the Ravens' official pump-up song. It was first played at the Ravens opening game of 2011 against the Steelers, and has been played at every home game since. It can often be heard at Orioles games as well. The song has been played whenever the Ravens score a touchdown or the Orioles hit a home run.

== See also ==
- Babe Ruth Birthplace and Museum
- Sports in Maryland
