= List of college lacrosse events =

This is a list of college lacrosse events.

== Regular season events ==
- Big City Classic, East Rutherford, New Jersey (2009–2013)
- Buckeye Invitational, Columbus, Ohio (1974)
- Bucknell Tournament, Lewisburg, Pennsylvania (1993)
- Day of Rivals, Baltimore, Maryland (2009–)
- Face-Off Classic, Baltimore, Maryland (2007–)
- Fleet Tournament, Providence, Rhode Island (1992)
- Indian Day Games, Piqua, Ohio (1978–1979)
- IKON Classic, Baltimore, Maryland (1998)
- Loyola Tournament, Baltimore, Maryland (1982, 1986, 1987, 1990)
- McDonald's Invitational, Durham and Greensboro, North Carolina (1985)
- Pioneer Classic, Denver, Colorado (2001, 2003, 2006)
- Rutgers Invitational, Piscataway, New Jersey (1990)
- The First 4, Carson, California (2005), San Diego, California (2006–2007)
- Triangle Lacrosse Classic, Durham and Chapel Hill, North Carolina (1989–1993), sponsored by Bank of America/NCNB
- UMBC Tournament, Baltimore, Maryland (1989, 1991)
- Notre Dame tournament, South Bend, Indiana (1964?–1967?)

== Postseason events ==
- NCAA men's lacrosse championships, the Division I, II, and III championship tournaments
- North/South Senior All-Star Game – Currently consists of two games, one for Division I and II players, and one for Division III players
- ACC men's lacrosse championship, Atlantic Coast Conference
- America East men's lacrosse championship, America East Conference
- CAA men's lacrosse championship, Colonial Athletic Association
- ECAC men's lacrosse championship, Eastern College Athletic Conference
- GWLL men's lacrosse championship, Great West Lacrosse League
- Ivy League men's lacrosse championship, Ivy League
- MAAC men's lacrosse championship, Metro Atlantic Athletic Conference
- MLA men's lacrosse championship, Midwest Lacrosse Association
- Patriot League men's lacrosse championship, Patriot League
