= Bill Miller (lacrosse) =

American lacrosse player

Personal information
- Nationality: American

Sport
- Position: Attack
- Shoots: Left
- Coached by: 1992, 1993 Assistant Coach University of Pennsylvania
- NLL teams: Philadelphia Wings
- NCAA team: Hobart College
- Pro career: 1991–1998

Career highlights
- 1988, 1989, 1990, 1991 NCAA Division III Men's Lacrosse Championship; 1990, 1991 Division III Player of the Year; 1989, 1991 Division III Attackman of the Year; 1994, 1995, 1998 NLL Champions Cup Champion (Philadelphia Wings); 1994, 1998 World Lacrosse Championship Champions (United States); Pennsylvania Lacrosse Hall of Fame; National Lacrosse Hall of Fame entry

Bill Miller (born c. 1967) was a three-time first-team All-American NCAA lacrosse player at Hobart College from 1988 to 1991.

== Lacrosse career ==
Miller teamed with players such as Jeff Tambroni and Tom Gravante to lead Hobart College to the NCAA Men's Lacrosse Championship for four consecutive years, from 1988 through 1991. In the 1991 championship game, the last of an unprecedented 12 straight titles for Hobart, Miller had two goals in defeating previously unbeaten Salisbury, 12–11.

Miller is ninth in all-time NCAA Division III total points, with 173 goals and 145 assists for 318 total points in 67 games. He was awarded the Jack Turnbull Award as Division III National Player of the Year in 1990 and 1991.

Following his years at Hobart, Bill went on to play club lacrosse with Mount Washington, as well as playing on two Team USA World Championship squads in 1994 and 1998. He also won the 1994, 1995 and 1998 NLL Champions Cup Champion with the Philadelphia Wings and was named the game two MVP in the 1998 Champions Cup against the Baltimore Thunder.

Miller played his high school lacrosse at Episcopal Academy. In his senior year, 1987, he led Episcopal to a state championship, winning the Avery F. Blake Memorial Trophy as the de facto Pennsylvania state champion.

Miller coached for two years as an assistant under G.W. Mix at the University of Pennsylvania in 1992 and 1993.

Miller was inducted into the Pennsylvania Lacrosse Hall of Fame in 2002. He was inducted into the National Lacrosse Hall of Fame in 2013.

Miller coaches for the Bronxville (NY) Youth Lacrosse Association, coaching the fifth grade boys program.

== Statistics ==
=== Hobart College ===
Season	GP	G	A	Pts	PPG
1988	18	32	46	78	--
1989	19	55	31	86	--
1990	16	39	39	78	--
1991	14	47	29	76	--
Totals	67	173	145 ^{[a]}	318 ^{[b]}	4.75

^{[a]} 18th in NCAA Division III career assists
^{[b]} 9th in NCAA Division III career points

=== Major Indoor Lacrosse League Career ===
	Regular Season					Playoffs
Season	GP	G	A	Pts	LB	PIM	GP	G	A	Pts	LB	PIM
1992	8	4	10	14	24	4	--	--	--	--	--	--
1993	7	4	3	7	23	4	--	--	--	--	--	--
1994	--	--	--	--	--	--	--	--	--	--	--	--
1998	9	8	10	18	29	8	--	--	--	--	--	--
Totals	53	24	34	58	168	68	--	--	--	--	--	-- (a)

^{(a)} Philadelphia Wings stats only (may not include complete MILL/NLL stats)

== See also ==
- 1994 Philadelphia Wings season
- Hobart College Athletics
- Lacrosse in Pennsylvania
- NCAA Men's Lacrosse Championships

== Awards ==
Preceded by ---	Jack Turnbull Award Div. III; 1990, 1991	Succeeded by ---
