= Lacrosse in Pennsylvania =

History of the Lacrosse sport in Pennsylvania

Lacrosse has been played in Pennsylvania since the 19th century. The state has amateur programs at the club, college, and high school level, and several past and present professional teams in the National Lacrosse League (NLL) and Major League Lacrosse (MLL).

== College lacrosse in Pennsylvania ==
=== History ===
==== 19th century ====
The first lacrosse team in North America was the Montreal Lacrosse Club, established in Montreal, by dentist, William George Beers. In 1834, a demonstration of lacrosse was given by the Caughnawaga Indians in Montreal, which resulted in growing interest by Canadian settlers. By the 1850s, Beers codified the game by adding rules and structure. Beers also petitioned for lacrosse to be named Canada's national sport, which led to the formation of the National Lacrosse Association. Montreal Lacrosse Club created the first set of written rules of the game of lacrosse. In 1860, Beers wrote up the codes, rules of the game, reducing the length of games and limiting the number of players to 12 per side. In 1867, the first game played under these new rules was played at Upper Canada College in Toronto, where Upper Canada lost to the Toronto Cricket Club 3–1.

Intercollegiate lacrosse in the United States can trace its roots to 1877, when New York University beat Manhattan College two to zero. Also in 1877, the Boston Lacrosse Club started at Harvard University, and the Harvard lacrosse team was established three years later, in 1880.

In 1879, the United States Amateur Lacrosse Association was formed by John R. Flannery, a Canadian club player, to coordinate the efforts of private, amateur lacrosse clubs in several cities in the Northeastern United States, including a club that formed in Bradford, Pennsylvania. Flannery grew up in Canada, where he was a member of the Montreal Shamrocks Lacrosse Club, and subsequently moved to the United States where he played for a number of amateur east coast clubs. In 1878, he organized a game billed as the National Championship between Union Lacrosse Club and Ravenswood Lacrosse Club of New York City. Encouraged by the turnout of some 40,000 spectators, Flannery set about organizing the disparate lacrosse clubs into a cohesive organization. Ravenswood Lacrosse Club with John Flannery went on to influence lacrosse at several other colleges, playing a well-publicized game against New York University in 1879.

In 1881, the first true varsity level intercollegiate lacrosse tournament was held, with Harvard defeating Princeton University in the final, 3–0. This series led to the formation of a league in 1882, known as the Inter-Collegiate Lacrosse Association (the ICLA, later the ILA), which included New York University, Columbia University, Princeton, and Harvard. At the same time, Flannery's United States Amateur Lacrosse Association comprised eleven college and club teams, but by 1886 the number of clubs had risen to greater than 40. College organizations, including a varsity team at Lehigh University in Bethlehem, soon sought admittance to the ILA. Lehigh fielded its first varsity squad in 1885, with the University of Pennsylvania in Philadelphia, and Lafayette College in Easton, at the club level, following suit in 1890. Lehigh and Swarthmore were accepted as members in the ILA in 1888 and 1891, respectively.

The first tournament for lacrosse supremacy during this period was known as the Oelrichs Cup, sponsored by Hermann Oelrichs, and first offered up in a tournament format in 1881. Oelrichs was the first president of the United States National Amateur Lacrosse Association, a precursor to the USILA, and he was a member of the New York Lacrosse Club. The Oelrichs Cup was played for much of the 1880s, played mostly by amateur non-scholastic clubs though Princeton did field a tournament team. Arnold K. Reese as part of a powerful Baltimore lacrosse club, won the Oelrichs Cup in 1890. At the same time, Reese had been the main force behind starting up varsity lacrosse at Lehigh University. Reese's efforts led to Lehigh being one of the early college lacrosse powers. Reese played for Lehigh from 1888 to 1891, winning an ILA title in 1890.

In 1898, another league, the Inter-University Lacrosse League (IULL) was formed playing with slightly different rules, with Harvard, Columbia and Cornell as charter members. Many of the member teams of both the ILA and IULL joined, dropped out or rejoined at various times over the years. In December 1905, representatives from all the colleges in the two leagues met in New York and formed the United States Inter-Collegiate Lacrosse League, the USICLL initially, soon to be known as the USILL. The colleges entering into this association were Columbia, Cornell, Harvard, Johns Hopkins, Lehigh, Pennsylvania, Stevens, and Swarthmore. The USILL acted as the governing body for lacrosse in the United States until it was replaced by the USILA in 1926.

During the first 40 years of organized varsity college lacrosse, known alternately as the ICLA, ILA, USICLL, USILL and USILA, two Pennsylvania schools, Lehigh and Swarthmore, fielded dominant teams. The two teams were voted National Champions of college lacrosse a combined fourteen (14) seasons. Glenn "Pop" Warner, the Hall of Fame football coach at the Carlisle Indian School (PA) from 1899 to 1903, substituted lacrosse for baseball during the spring season because he said, "Lacrosse is a developer of health and strength. It is a game that spectators rave over once they understand it." It is also likely that lacrosse, a contact sport, helped prepare his football players for the fall season. By 1920, the USILL had expanded to include teams from Syracuse, Rutgers, Penn State and, encouraged by Pop Warner, even considered adding a varsity team at the University of Pittsburgh.

==== 20th century ====
In 1920, college lacrosse realigned their association, adding a Southern Division, which included powerful teams from Lehigh, Penn, and Swarthmore along with traditional power Johns Hopkins University in Baltimore. The United States Intercollegiate Lacrosse Association (USILA), the organization still in existence today, officially was formed in November 1925.

As of 1942, the association had only 23 member colleges at that time. The members of the U.S. Intercollegiate Lacrosse Association for the 1942 season were: City College of New York, Cornell University, Dartmouth College, Drexel Institute of Technology, Harvard University, Hobart College, Johns Hopkins University, Lafayette College, Loyola College, University of Maryland, Massachusetts Institute of Technology, Penn State College, University of Pennsylvania, Princeton University, Rutgers University, Stevens Institute of Technology, Swarthmore College, Syracuse University, Union College, United States Military Academy, United States Naval Academy and Yale University.

Lehigh fielded its first varsity squad in 1885, with the University of Pennsylvania and Lafayette College at the club level following suit in 1890. Penn played intermittently upon starting up lacrosse and so lists 1900 as their first official season of varsity lacrosse. Penn State played its first intercollegiate game against Penn in 1913. In 1917, Lehigh which had gone undefeated for two straight seasons and had won the Southern division that season, won the USILL championship by defeating Penn in overtime 5 to 4 at Franklin Field in a title matchup. Lehigh had beaten Cornell, the Northern division champions, the prior season to capture a share of the USILL national lacrosse title.

Swarthmore won four national titles in the early years of lacrosse. Baltimore Hall of Famer, Philip E. Lamb, led Swarthmore to consecutive titles in 1904 and 1905, "in the days when Swarthmore and Johns Hopkins were the perennial national champs", according to Lamb's Hall of Fame entry. Also, in 1940 Penn State attempted a college box lacrosse league playing top universities including Yale. An appropriately named College Division dominated lacrosse in the early 1950s, consisting of some 20 undergraduate schools from Rensselaer Polytechnic, Army, Virginia, Navy, Hofstra, Yale, Baltimore University, Maryland, Delaware, Drexel, Princeton, Duke, Washington College, Washington and Lee, Johns Hopkins, Loyola, and Western Maryland as well as two club teams from Mount Washington and Maryland Lacrosse Club. Drexel represented Pennsylvania schools well in 1952 reaching as high as number six in the standings. In the latter part of the 1950s with some 60 colleges playing lacrosse, schools were divided into three divisions. While the 'A Division' included traditional national powers Navy and Johns Hopkins, the 'B Division' and 'C Division' consisted of several potent Pennsylvania universities including Penn, Swarthmore, Penn State, Lehigh, Dickinson, Drexel, and Lafayette.

==== 1954 College Division Final National Rankings ====
1954 College Division -- Final National Rankings (National Champions in Blue bold) (Pennsylvania schools in italics) (Note: National champions were declared as Navy, Syracuse & Washington College, and Union, in 1954. Pennsylvania schools were represented in the B and C divisions. Drexel (Drexel Tech at that time) is not listed in the 1954 rankings, though they did defeat Delaware, Lafayette, Dickinson and Lehigh that season. The last "major college" men's lacrosse title for a Pennsylvania school was Lehigh, named the 1959 USILA Class C Division III national co-champion.)

A Division
(Cyrus Miller Division)
- Navy
- Army
- Duke
- Maryland
- Princeton
- Johns Hopkins
- Virginia
- Yale
- Rensselaer Polytechnic
  Institute

B Division
(Laurie Cox Division)
- Syracuse
- Washington College
- Hofstra
- Harvard
- University of Pennsylvania
- Rutgers
- Cornell
- Baltimore
- Swarthmore College
- Loyola
- Hobart
- Dartmouth
- Pennsylvania State University
- Williams
- University of Delaware

C Division
(Roy Taylor Division)
- Union
- New Hampshire
- Stevens Tech
- Amherst
- Lehigh University
- Oberlin
- MIT
- Adelphi
- CCNY
- Cortland State
- Tufts
- Hamilton
- Dickinson College
- Lafayette College
- Worcester Poly

Lehigh University has won eleven national titles under various pre-NCAA United States Intercollegiate Lacrosse Association formats for national championships, while Swarthmore University has won five titles.

More recently under the NCAA tournament format in place since 1971, Pennsylvania based universities have participated in many NCAA Men's Lacrosse Championship tournaments including Bucknell (2), Cabrini (16), Drexel (1), Franklin & Marshall (5), Gettysburg (25), Lehigh (2), Kutztown (1), Messiah College (2), Penn (12), Penn State (4), Swarthmore (1), Widener (6) and Villanova (2).

In the 1988 NCAA tournament, Penn led by Tony Seaman and Chris Flynn were the first Pennsylvania school to reach the semi-finals, losing by one goal to the Gait Brothers led Syracuse Orange, which is as far as any Pennsylvania based Division I school has advanced in tournament play. In all, Penn reached the NCAAs six times in the 1980s, including a quarterfinal appearance in 1987.

==== 21st century ====
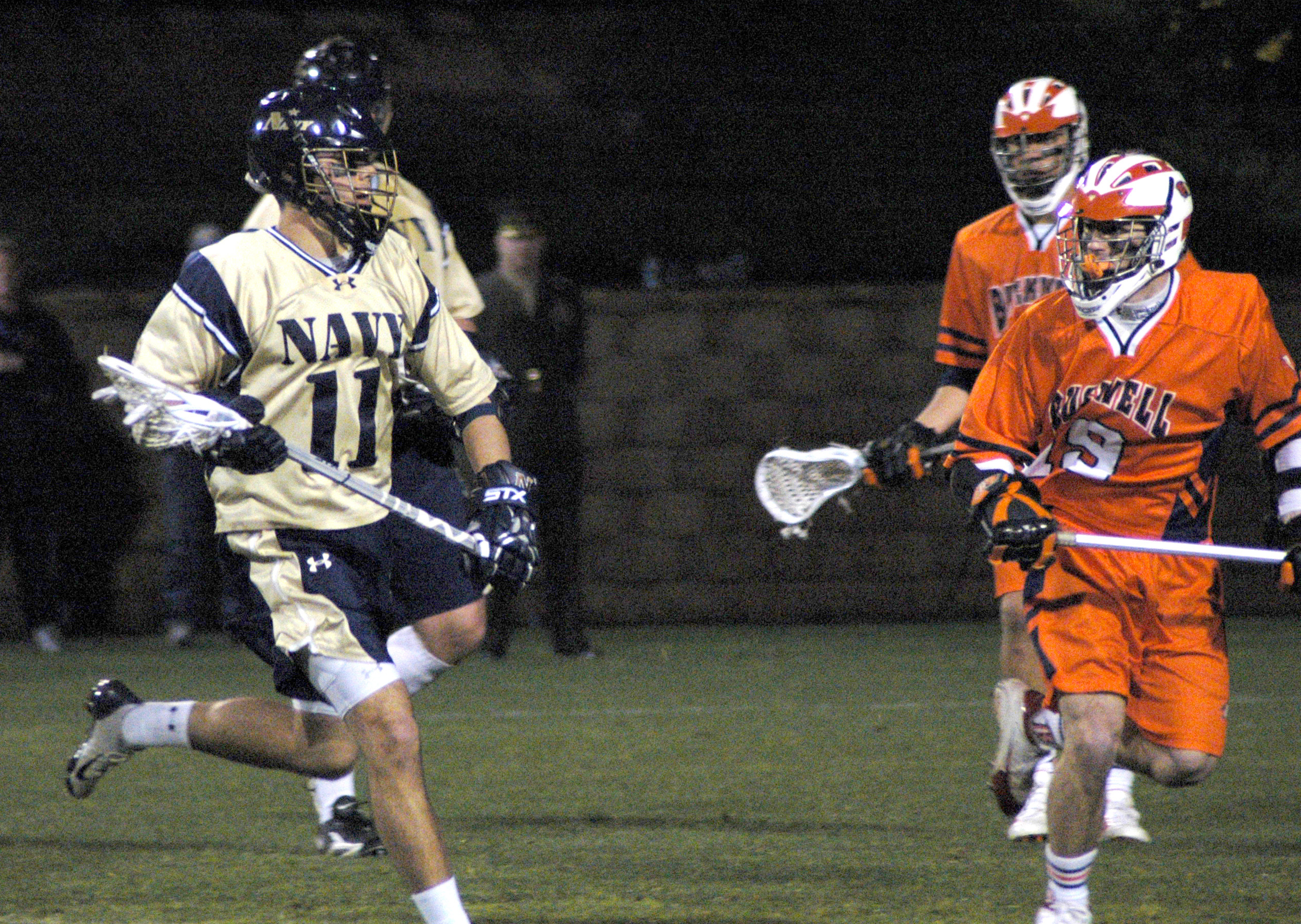
Bucknell plays Navy in the 2006 First 4

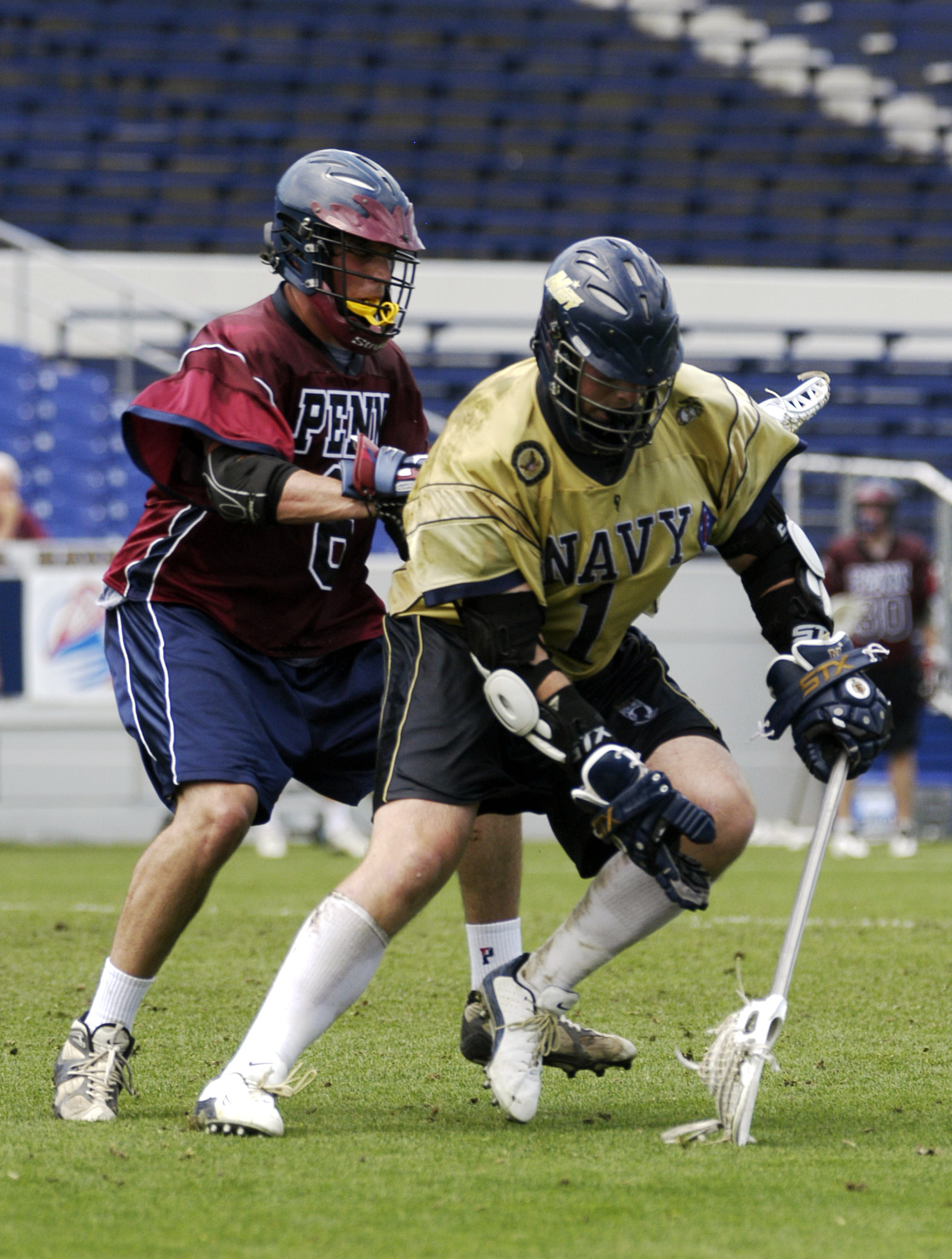
Penn plays Navy in the first round of the 2004 NCAA Division I Men's Lacrosse Championship

For the first time in 2011, a Pennsylvania university or college won the NCAA Division II National Title when Mercyhurst defeated Adelphi 9 to 8. Mercyhurst also played in the 2007 Division II national finals, losing a close contest to LeMoyne 6 to 5. Mercyhurst has been to three Division II finals.

Among recent highlights at the university level, the Penn State Nittany Lions men's team in 2019 was 16 and 2, was seeded number one in the 2019 NCAA tournament, becoming the first ever Pennsylvania team to get the number one NCAA seeding in Men's lacrosse and the second Pennsylvania team to make men's lacrosse Division I Final Four. Also in 2019. Grant Ament set the Division I single season record for assists in a season with 95 assists. In 2005, Penn State was named to the NCAA tournament after reaching number eleven in the national rankings. In 2006 Penn upset #3 Cornell on their way to getting an at-large berth in the NCAA tournament.

Gettysburg has had success in Division III, regularly appearing in the top five national rankings and reaching the NCAA title games in 2001, 2002 and 2009. Philadelphia has hosted six NCAA Men's Lacrosse Championship tournament in Divisions I, II & III at Franklin Field and Lincoln Financial Field. In 2009, Villanova defeated Towson in the conference finals to gain the team's first ever NCAA tournament bid. In 2009 Chris Bates head coach for ten years at Drexel took the top job at Princeton.

In 2007, Drexel upset number one ranked and defending National Champion Virginia, 11 to 10, scoring the game-winning goal with three seconds remaining. In 2010, Lafayette won their first six games including consecutive upsets over Navy and Bucknell reaching a national ranking of number eight.

In 2011, for the first time, three Pennsylvania schools were represented in the 16 team NCAA tournament. Penn and Villanova were selected as at-large tournament picks. Bucknell made the tournament by virtue of an automatic qualifier, winning the Patriot league tournament, they took eventual champion Virginia to overtime before losing their first-round game. In 2012 Lehigh was seeded number seven in the NCAA tournament, the first seeded Pennsylvania team since Penn was seeded number four in 1988, they took Maryland to late in their first-round game losing on a Terp goal with just six seconds left. Lehigh also won the Patriot League title in 2013, earning an automatic bid to the NCAA tournament, where they lost to UNC. In 2014, Drexel played in their first NCAA tournament and also become the first Pennsylvania Division I school to win an NCAA tournament game since Penn reached the Final Four in 1988. Penn State has received NCAA tournament seedings, in 2017 they were the number seven seed and in 2013 Penn State received the number eight seed in the tournament.

=== Men's university lacrosse titles ===
NCAA or USILA National Titles - 19
- Lehigh - 1890, 1893, 1895, 1896, 1897, 1914, 1916, 1917, 1920, 1921 USILA Champions, 1959 USILA Class C Division III National Co-Champion - (11)
- Swarthmore - 1901, 1904, 1905, 1910 USILA Champions, 1953 USILA Division II National Champion - (5)
- Dickinson - 1958 USILA Class C Division III National Co-Champion - (1)
- Mercyhurst - 2011 NCAA Division II Champions - (1)
- Cabrini - 2019 NCAA Division III Champions - (1)

=== Women's university level ===
Women's lacrosse began at St Leonards School in Scotland in the 1890s, and was introduced to the United States in 1926 at Bryn Mawr School in Baltimore. The United States Women's Lacrosse Association was established in 1931. Penn State started up a women's program in 1965 and Lock Haven University in 1969. And in 1971 the Association for Intercollegiate Athletics for Women was founded to govern collegiate women's athletics in the United States and to administer national championships.

The most successful programs have been Temple University and Penn State in both the AIAW and NCAA Division I, West Chester University in Division II, as well as Ursinus College and Franklin & Marshall in Division III. Pennsylvania colleges and universities have won a combined 17 USWLA, AIAW and NCAA women's lacrosse national titles.

Temple won championships in 1984 and 1988; Penn State in 1978, 1979, 1980, 1987 and 1989; West Chester in 2002 and 2008; Ursinus in 1986, 1989 and 1990; and Franklin & Marshall in 2007 and 2009. The Penn State Nittany Lions (women) in 1978, 1979 and 1980 went 45-1-3, won the first 3 national collegiate (USWLA) championships in the sport of women's lacrosse, defeating Maryland, Massachusetts and Maryland, respectively, under head coach Gillian Rattray.

Marsha Florio of Penn State and Gail Cummings of Temple are currently the 3rd and 4th all-time highest scoring Division I players with 380 and 378 career points, respectively. Stephanie Kienle and Katelyn Martin both of West Chester are the 1st and 2nd highest all-time scoring Division II players with 390 and 376 career points, respectively.

In 2009 Franklin & Marshall won the Division III national title defeating Salisbury 11 to 10. In 2011 Gettysburg won the Division III national title defeating Bowdoin 16 to 5. Gettysburg won the title again in 2017.

=== Women's university lacrosse titles ===
NCAA, USWLA or AIAW Titles - 19

- Penn State - 1978, 1979, 1980 USWLA Champions, 1987, 1989 NCAA Division I Champions (5)
- Temple - 1982 AIAW Division I Champions, 1984, 1988 NCAA Division I Champions (3)
- Ursinus – 1986, 1989, 1990 NCAA Division III Champions (3)
- Gettysburg – 2011, 2017, 2018 NCAA Division III Champions (3)
- West Chester – 2002, 2008 NCAA Division II Champions (2)
- Franklin & Marshall – 2007, 2009 NCAA Division III Champions (2)
- Millersville State – 1982 AIAW Division III Champions (1)

== High school ==
- see also, List of Historic Pennsylvania High School, Prep Champions
- see also, PhillyLacrosse.com List of all-time Pennsylvania boys’ state champions

=== 20th century ===
Lacrosse development at the private preparatory school or public high school level in Pennsylvania by the mid-1950s had progressed more slowly than at the collegiate level. At that time, Lower Merion High School and Swarthmore High School were among only a handful of Pennsylvania schools offering varsity lacrosse as a spring sport at the high school level, usually playing against college level junior varsity squads.

By 1965, a state high school championship system had been put in place. The Hill School in Pottstown was named the first Pennsylvania prep statewide champion of what became known as the Avery Blake Memorial Trophy. Since 2001, with the expansion of lacrosse programs at high schools throughout the state, a new format, the Keystone Cup, has been played where three state sectional champions meet to determine the statewide champion.

In 1973, Sewickley Academy hosted Western Pennsylvania's first high lacrosse championship tournament featuring teams from Philadelphia, Detroit, and Annapolis, Maryland. Peet Poillon along with his father started up the lacrosse program at Seneca Valley High School in western Pennsylvania in 2001, with Poillon also scoring 410 career goals. In 2009, Emily Garrity of Strath Haven High School broke the career scoring record for women with 695 total points.

Pennsylvania high schools with the most state lacrosse titles include Lower Merion (7), Ridley (6), Haverford School (5), and Penn Charter (5). In 2008, LaSalle College High won the state title and was ranked fourth in the nation, the highest national ranking of a Pennsylvania prep school up to then. Haverford School regularly appears in the top 15 nationally, and plays recognized programs such as The Gilman and Lawrenceville Schools. Three schools have repeated as champion for three straight years, Harriton High School from 1970 to 1972, Penn Charter from 1974 to 1976 and Ridley from 2001 to 2003. In the 2009 state finals, LaSalle won its second consecutive title in defeating Conestoga High School in its first appearance in the state finals, 7 to 3. LaSalle ended the year ranked 4th in a national poll for the second straight season, while Conestoga finished the year ranked 12th.

=== 21st century ===
In 2011, for the first time a Pennsylvania prep school, the Haverford School Fords were named National High School lacrosse champions. The Fords topped the national polls in both the Laxpower.com and Inside Lacrosse rankings, while repeat Pennsylvania Public champions Conestoga finished third and fourth nationally, respectively.

In 2016, Haverford was again voted high school/prep national champions.

High School National Titles - 2
- The Haverford School - 2011, 2015 voted National Prep/High School Champions

== Professional lacrosse in Pennsylvania ==
=== 20th century ===
In 1974, the original Philadelphia Wings became the first professional lacrosse team to operate out of Pennsylvania. The team included popular Philadelphia Flyer player Doug Favell, and the well-known Gene Hart announcing games for the team, as well as Canadian star John Grant Sr., father of John Grant, Jr. The Wings drew crowds of over 10,000 at the Spectrum and reached the league finals in 1974. The team folded along with the original NLL in 1975.

In 1985, a box lacrosse USA/Canada Superseries, an eight-game series, was played at the Spectrum in Philadelphia. This series revitalized interest in box lacrosse and was a precursor to the Major Indoor Lacrosse League and National Lacrosse League.

The Philadelphia Wings, one of the original NLL franchises was started up again in 1987 by among others Mike French, was subsequently disbanded, and had the most championships of any NLL team with six. Early on the Wings made an effort to connect with the local community by drafting local talent including Scott Growney from Harriton High School, J.R. Castle from William Penn Charter School, Mark Moschella and Scott Carruthers from Drexel, Chris Flynn from Penn, and Tony Resch from Penn Charter. Strong fan support was evident even in the Wings initial season, where the team averaged over 10,000 fans for their home games in 1987. Lacrosse Hall of Famers Gary Gait, Paul Gait, Tom Marechek and Dallas Eliuk are among the notable players who have been a part of the club.

The Pittsburgh Bulls played in the NLL from 1990 to 1993 including players Dave Pietramala and Kevin Bilger, and the Pittsburgh CrosseFire played a single season in 2000 until they relocated to become the Colorado Mammoth. In 2004, the Philadelphia Barrage of Major League Lacrosse moved from Bridgeport and played until 2008 when they folded along with three other teams. In five years of operation, the Barrage won three league championships. The team played its home games at United Sports Training Center in West Bradford Township, Pennsylvania.

=== 21st century ===
The NLL once again awarded Philadelphia an NLL franchise for 2018, with this new franchise not associated to the prior Philadelphia franchise, and once more adopting the name Wings.

The Premier Lacrosse League (PLL), a field lacrosse league that started play in 2019, held its first championship game at Talen Energy Stadium, now known as Subaru Park, in Chester. The league uses a unique tour-based model, in which all teams (with the exception of those given bye weeks) play at a single venue over a weekend. After the 2020 season, MLL and PLL merged, with the merged league operating under the PLL branding.

NLL or MLL Titles - 9
- Wings - 1989, 1990, 1994, 1995, 1998, 2001 NLL Champions (6)
- Barrage - 2004, 2006, 2007 MLL Champions (3)

== Pennsylvania lacrosse programs ==
The national governing body of lacrosse is US Lacrosse. US Lacrosse services the state of Pennsylvania through three local chapters: the Pittsburgh chapter, the Central Pennsylvania Lacrosse chapter and the Philadelphia Lacrosse Association. All three maintain the Pennsylvania Lacrosse Hall of Fame, which honors the great players, coaches, officials and promoters who have made significant contributions to the game at the professional, college and high school levels in Pennsylvania.

=== College ===
Pennsylvania based College Lacrosse programs have combined for 38 national lacrosse titles, in Men's and Women's lacrosse, Divisions I, II and III, as well as pre-NCAA titles.

The latest National Champion winners among Pennsylvania universities were Cabrini winning the 2019 NCAA Division III men's title, Mercyhurst with the 2011 NCAA Division II men's title and Gettysburg with the 2018 NCAA Division III women's title.

Lock Haven University reached the women's Division II finals in 2014 and 2015, losing a close match in 2015, 5–4.

Combined men's and women's teams.

University Name	Location	Year Started	Division	NCAA-AIAW-USILA tournaments	Titles	Latest Title
Bucknell University	Lewisburg	1968	I	2		
Cabrini University	Radnor	1994	III	39	1	2019
Dickinson College	Carlisle	1951	III	6	1	1958
Drexel University	Philadelphia	1941	I	8		
Franklin & Marshall College	Lancaster	1947	III	27	2	2009
Gettysburg College	Gettysburg	1958	III	49	3	2018
Lafayette College	Easton	1926	I	4		
Lehigh University	Bethlehem	1885	I	4	11	1959
Mercyhurst University	Erie	1997	II	15	1	2011
Messiah College	Grantham	1997	III	13		
Millersville University	Millersville	1967	III	1	1	1982
Pennsylvania State University	State College	1913	I	34	5	1989
Robert Morris University	Moon Township	2005	I	3		
Saint Joseph's University	Philadelphia	1993	I	2		
Swarthmore College	Swarthmore	1891	III	3	5	1953
Temple University	Philadelphia	1975	I	18	3	1988
University of Pennsylvania (Penn)	Philadelphia	1900	I	30		
Ursinus College	Collegeville	1960	III	12	3	1990
Villanova University	Villanova	1981	I	3		
West Chester University of Pennsylvania	West Chester	1939	II	19	3	2008
Widener University	Chester	1926	III	6		
York College	York	1999	III	14		

=== High school ===
- Carlisle Area High School (Carlisle, Pennsylvania)
- Conestoga High School (Tredyffrin Township, Pennsylvania)
- Episcopal Academy (Newtown Square, Pennsylvania)
- Friends' Central School (Wynnewood, Pennsylvania)
- Germantown Academy (Fort Washington, Pennsylvania)
- Haverford School (Haverford, Pennsylvania)
- La Salle College High School (Philadelphia, Pennsylvania)
- Lower Merion High School (Lower Merion, Pennsylvania)
- Malvern Preparatory School (Malvern, Pennsylvania)
- Mt. Lebanon High School (Mt. Lebanon, Pennsylvania)
- North Allegheny High School (Wexford, Pennsylvania)
- Penn Charter (Philadelphia, Pennsylvania)
- Penncrest High School (Media, Pennsylvania)
- Ridley High School (Ridley, Pennsylvania)
- Sewickley Academy (Sewickley, Pennsylvania)
- Springfield High School (Springfield, Pennsylvania)
- Spring-Ford High School (Collegeville, Pennsylvania)
- The Hill School (Pottstown, Pennsylvania)
- Upper Merion Area High School (King of Prussia, Pennsylvania)
- Upper Saint Clair High School (Upper St. Clair Township, Pennsylvania)

== Notable college players and coaches from Pennsylvania ==
The players noted below are those players from the Pennsylvania prep and high school system, who have performed notably in college men's or women's lacrosse. Among the criteria for notability include a player elected to the National Lacrosse Hall of Fame, a player elected to the Pennsylvania Lacrosse Hall of Fame, a player who played a significant role on a national championship team, as well as players who achieved significant statistical measurements at the college level.

Player	Team	Years	Comments
Dox Aitken	Virginia	2017-2021	Two time 1st Team All-American at Midfield. Key contributor on two UVA national title teams, 2019 and 2021. UVA's all-time career point and goal leader by a midfielder. Prep All American at The Haverford School and key contributor to Haverford School's 2015 #1 ranked team.
Grant Ament	Penn State	2016–2020	Two-time 1st team All American, led Penn State to their first NCAA Semifinals in 2019. Won Attackman of the Year award in 2019. Set the Division I single season record for Assists in a Season. Prep All American at Haverford School and key contributor to Haverford School's 2015 #1 ranked team.
Avery Blake Sr.	Swarthmore	1931–1969	Long time Swarthmore and University of Pennsylvania coach. Coached Swarthmore 1953 squad to USILA Class "B" National title. Father and son Blake Sr. and Avery Blake Jr. are both in National Lacrosse Hall of Fame.
Avery Blake Jr.	Swarthmore	1950–1953	Two time 1st team All American at midfield and attack, first 4-time lacrosse All-American from Pennsylvania. Avery Blake Sr. long-time coach at Swarthmore and Penn as well as Blake Jr. are both in National Lacrosse Hall of Fame.
Kyle Barrie	Johns Hopkins	2002–2005	Two time All-American at attack. Key contributor on 2003 Hopkins' finals team. Won national title in 2005 with Johns Hopkins. Among Hopkins' lacrosse all-time leading scorers. Prep All American at The Haverford School.
Jake Bergey	Salisbury	1994–1997	Three time 1st team All-American at attack. Key contributor on two straight 1994 and 1995 Salisbury championship teams. Prep All American at Tatnall School. Long time All-Pro with the Philadelphia Wings.
Eric Bishop	Salisbury	2004–2007	1st team All-American at attack. Key contributor on the 2004, 2005 and 2007 Salisbury championship teams. Prep All American at Penncrest High School. Assistant coached at Swarthmore.
Karen Emas Borbee	Delaware	1980–1983	3 time All American at University of Delaware. Led Delaware to Championships in 1981, 1982, and 1983. Prep star at Penncrest High School.
Johnny Christmas	Virginia	2002–2005	2 time All-American attackman. Key contributor to the 2003 Virginia national title and 2005 Final Four teams. Prep All American at Lower Merion. Long time coach at De La Salle.
Brian Christopher	Johns Hopkins	2006–2009	All-American midfielder and key contributor to 2007 Johns Hopkins national title team. Prep All-American at Springfield High School.
Ken Clausen	Virginia	2007–2010	3 time 1st team All-American defenseman. Led UVA to 3 straight national semi-finals. Prep All American at The Hill School.
Jeff Conner	Virginia	2019-2023	Key All-American midfielder on two UVA national title teams, 2019 and 2021. Prep All American at Strath Haven High School.
Ralph "Rip" Davy	North Carolina	1976-1979	1st team All-American defenseman playing under Willie Scroggs, helped develop UNC lacrosse into national power. UNC's first ever 1st team Division I All-American. Prep star at The Hill School.
Brian Dougherty	Maryland	1993–1996	Two-time 1st team All-American and two-time NCAA Goaltender of the Year. Named 1995 NCAA Championship Outstanding Player leading Terps to finals. Prep All American at Episcopal Academy.
Tucker Durkin	Johns Hopkins	2010–2014	3 time All-American, 2 time 1st team All American, key to defensive unit that led Hopkins to two NCAA Quarterfinals in 2011 and 2012. Prep All American at La Salle College High School. Named All-World defenseman at the 2014 World Lacrosse Championship, two-time NCAA Defenseman of the Year.
James Ferguson	Johns Hopkins	1971–1973	2 time All-American, key to defensive unit that led Hopkins to NCAA Finals in 1972 and 1973 under legendary coach Bob Scott. Prep All American at Lower Merion, one of the first PA Prep stars to play on top tier college lacrosse program.
Dennis Fink	Drexel	1976–1978	All-American attackman, led nation in scoring in his senior season with 98 points in 12 games. Among NCAA Division I all-time leading scorers, among All-time leaders in single season points-per-game. Prep star at Springfield High School.
Candy Finn	Penn State	1979–1982	3 time All-American led the Nittany Lions in scoring in each of her four years (1979–1982), with two USWLA national championships. Holds Penn State record for goals scored in a game (14). Ranks second in career points (334) and career goals (265) for PSU. Three sport prep star at Penncrest High School.
Chris Flynn	Penn	1986-89	1st team All-American midfielder. Prep All-American at Episcopal Academy. Key player on 1988 Penn Final Four team. Key contributor to Philadelphia Wings from 1990 to 1999, including four NLL championship.
Kathleen Geiger	Temple	1983–1986	2 time All American, 1st team All American in 1985. Led Temple to Championship in 1984. Prep star at Lansdowne-Aldan High School.
John Haldy	Virginia	2008–2011	Key contributor to 3 straight national semifinal teams and captain of the 2011 Virginia national title team. Prep All-American at The Haverford School.
George A. Kruse	Kutztown	1975-77	All- American attack and longtime lacrosse official. All-time leader in NCAA lacrosse points-per-game. From 1975 to 1977 averaged 7.9 points per game, which is 1st all time in Division II.
Kurt Lunkenheimer	Princeton	1995–1998	2 time All-American Defenseman on 1996, 1997 and 1998 national title teams. Prep All-American at Episcopal Academy.
Jeff MacBean	Princeton	1993–1996	All-Ivy midfielder on 1994 and 1996 national title teams. Overtime assist to Kevin Lowe in 1994 finals gave Princeton the title. Prep All-American at Episcopal Academy.
David Maguire	Ohio Wesleyan	1995–1998	3 time 1st team All-American attack including Division III Jack Turnbull Award winner in 1997. Sixth all-time in Division III scoring with 225 goals 96 assists and 321 points. Prep All American at Marple Newtown High School.
Bill McGlone	Maryland	2003–2006	2 time 1st team All-American midfielder on three national semifinal teams. Prep All-American at Ridley High School. Professional player for the Philadelphia Wings and Chicago Machine.
Matt McMonagle	Cornell	2005–2008	1st team All-American goalie, Ensign C. Markland Kelly, Jr. Award winner on 2007 regular season undefeated Big Red squad. Prep star at Episcopal Academy. Professional player with Long Island Lizards.
Bill Miller	Hobart	1988–1991	3 time 1st team All-American attack including Division III Player of the Year in 1990 and 1991. Led Hobart to four straight Division III National Titles. Among all-time Division III scorers with 318 points (173g, 145a). Prep star at Episcopal Academy. Miller was inducted into the National Lacrosse Hall of Fame in 2013.
Matt Moore	Virginia	2018-22	3 time All-American at attack. Key contributor on two national title teams, 2019 and 2021. Among all-time leading Division I scorers with over 270 career points. Prep star at Garnett Valley for head coach Frank Urso.
Brett Moyer	Hofstra	2003–2006	1st and 2nd team All American defenseman at Hofstra. Won two straight state titles at Ridley. Defensive anchor for 2006 Quarterfinal team. Professional player with Philadelphia Wings and Philadelphia Barrage.
Amanda O'Leary	Temple, Yale, Florida	1984–1988	Hall of Fame player at Temple and coach at Yale and Florida. 1988 NCAA Player of the Year, led Temple to perfect 19–0 record and NCAA Women's Lacrosse Championship. Spring-Ford High School prep star and All-American in both lacrosse and field hockey at Temple.
Pete Ortale	Duke	1984–1987	All-ACC midfielder at Duke. Two-time All American at Penn Charter where he won a PA state title. 9-11 Attack Casualty. Elected to PA Lacrosse Hall of Fame.
Austin Pifani	North Carolina	2014–2017	Four time All American, 1st team All American in 2017. Key contributor to 2016 UNC national title team. Prep All-American at Abington High School.
Jackson Place	Bucknell	2011–2014	All-American defenseman, earned Bucknell's Lee "Bud" Ranck Award. Second nationally with 38 caused turnovers in 2014. Prep All-American at Episcopal Academy. Led Ohio Machine to MLL Finals in 2016.
Peet Poillon	UMBC, Ohio State	2006–2009	2nd Team All-American midfielder for UMBC and All-American at Ohio State. Junior College All-American at Howard (Md.) Community. Prep All- American at Seneca Valley High School, where Poillon and his father started up the varsity lacrosse program. Poillon scored 410 career goals at Seneca.
Matt Rambo	Maryland	2014–2017	Two time All-American, 1st team All American attack in 2017, Three-time Prep All- American at LaSalle College High School. Led Terps to three straight NCAA finals including 2017 title. Among all-time Terps leader in scoring with 257 points.
Tyler Rankel	Robert Morris	2010-2014	Defenseman at Robert Morris, All-NEC Rookie pick in 2011 and an NEC Second Team pick in 2014. Rankel amassed 96 ground balls, 60 caused turnovers, 3 goals and 7 assists. Member of NEC All-Academic Team all 4 years.
Tony Resch	Yale	1977–1980	Two time All-American defenseman at Yale, long time coach at National Lacrosse League and Major Lacrosse League levels. Won three NLL titles as player with Wings. Prep star at Penn Charter. Selected to NLL Hall of Fame and National Lacrosse Hall of Fame.
Gerald Ronon	Princeton	1982–1985	All-American attack at Princeton and Prep All American at Lower Merion. In top twenty all time Princeton scoring. Won two state titles at Lower Merion.
Joe Sankey	North Carolina	2012–2015	Three time All-American attackman, 1st all-time in UNC scoring and key contributor to several UNC NCAA Tournament teams. Prep All American at Penn Charter.
Peter Scott	Johns Hopkins	1981–1984	1st team All-American at attack and a key contributor to four straight NCAA final Hopkins teams, including the 1984 National Championship team. Among the all-time Leading Scorers at Johns Hopkins. Prep All-American at Harriton High School and Avon Old Farms. Member of Pennsylvania Lacrosse Hall of Fame. Played professionally for the Philadelphia Wings.
Michael Sowers	Princeton / Duke	2017–2021	4 time All-American, 2 time 1st team All American. Finished career second all time in Division I points with 383. Led Duke to the 2021 NCAA Final Four. Prep All American at Upper Dublin.
Ward Steidle	North Carolina	1979–1982	Key contributor at midfield to two straight NCAA national title teams including 1981 and 1982 National Champions. Prep star at Harriton High School.
Kyle Sweeney	Georgetown	2000–2003	3 time All-American including 1st team All American at Georgetown, led Georgetown to 3 NCAA quarterfinal appearances, 2-time ECAC Defensive Player of the Year. Played on 2006 and 2010 U.S. Men’s national teams winning gold medal in 2010, named to All-World team. Prep All American at Springfield High School. Sweeney was inducted into the National Lacrosse Hall of Fame in 2023.
Glenn Thiel	Penn State, University of Virginia	1968–2010	Long time Penn State coach. Won two national titles in 1970 and 1972 as head coach of UVA. Among the all-time leaders in college coaching victories with over 300 wins. Prepped at State College High School (PA). Starting midfielder at Penn State playing for his Hall of Fame father, Nick Thiel.
Nick Thiel	Penn State, Syracuse University	1929–1956	Hall of Fame player under Roy Simmons Sr., long time head coach at Penn State. Was an assistant coach at Syracuse under Roy Simmons Sr. Coached 22 years at Penn State. Son Glenn, also a long time head coach at Penn State.
Cindy Timchal	West Chester, Maryland	1973–present	Prep and college star at Haverford High and West Chester. Coached Maryland to seven NCAA Championships and an NCAA record 50 straight wins in the 1990s and 2000s. All-time leader in career coaching wins with a record of 349 wins and 90 losses at Maryland, Northwestern and Navy.
Greg Traynor	Virginia	1992–1995	All-American midfield and key contributor to 1994 NCAA finals team. Prep All American at Conestoga High School. Professional with the Philadelphia Wings, Boston Cannons, Long Island Lizards, New Jersey Pride. Member of 1998 USA Men's World Championship Team.
Greg Waller	Princeton	1989–1992	All American midfielder scored go-ahead goal, also won overtime faceoff converted by Andy Moe into title-winning goal in 1992 National Championship game, won by Princeton in two overtimes. Prep star at West Chester East High School.
Luke Wierman	Maryland	2020–2024	Three time All American including 1st Team AA in 2022 at faceoff. Key to two straight Maryland national final teams as well as undefeated 2022 National Title team, Terps were 33 and 1 over that 2021-2022 two year period. Prep All American at West Chester Henderson.
Kyle Wharton	Johns Hopkins	2008–2011	2 time All-American attack, 20th all-time in goals scored at Hopkins and contributor to 2008 NCAA Hopkins finals team. Prep All American at The Haverford School.
Jordan Wolf	Duke	2011–2014	Four-time All-American at attack. Led Duke to two straight national championships, 2013 and 2014. Among all-time leaders in Division I career scoring with 304 points. Prep All American at Lower Merion.
Randy Kleinman	Penn State	1997–2001	Honorable mention All American, anchored Penn State's midfield unit. 2x Prep All American at Marple Newtown High School, 2x 1st team All State, 2x Central League MVP. Played 4 season with the Philadelphia Wings and 1 season with San Jose Stealth of the NLL.

= in National Lacrosse Hall of Fame
= won NCAA/USWLA National Title

Notable players from Pennsylvania - Sources

== Notable college teams from Pennsylvania ==
The teams noted below are for universities based in Pennsylvania, who have performed notably in NCAA men's or women's lacrosse.

College Team	Year	Record	Comments
Bucknell Bison	1996	12-0	Only undefeated Bucknell lacrosse team, won the Patriot league title in 1996 with wins over Penn, Army and Navy. Controversially, was not selected for the 1996 NCAA Tournament.
Bucknell Bison	2011	14-3	No. 7 ranked team in 2011, won the Patriot league title. Led Virginia in 1st round of 2011 NCAA Tournament 10–6, losing game to eventual National Champion 13–12 in overtime.
Cabrini Cavaliers	2019	22-2	Won the 2019 NCAA Division III tournament, defeating Amherst 16–12 with the finals played in Philadelphia at Lincoln Financial Field. First PA men's team to win a Division III lacrosse title.
Drexel Dragons	2014	13-5	First Drexel lacrosse team to make an NCAA Tournament, defeated #4 seed Penn 16 to 11 in the 1st Round at Franklin Field, advancing to their only quarterfinals appearance.
Gettysburg Bullets	2009	16-4	2009 Division III National Finalist. Lost finals to Cortland State 9–7. Bullets made Division III finals three times during the 2000s.
Lehigh Mountain Hawks	2012	14-3	Won school's 1st Patriot league title in lacrosse. No. 7 seed in 2012 NCAAs. Ranked 4th in nation. Lost to National Title runner-up Maryland in 1st round 10–9 with 7 seconds remaining in game.
Mercyhurst Lakers	2011	14-2	Won the 2011 NCAA Division II tournament. 1st PA men's team to win Division II lacrosse title. Also 1st PA men's team to win a national lacrosse title of any kind since 1959.
Penn Quakers (men)	1988	11-4	1st PA based Division I team to reach NCAA Final Four. Led by coach Tony Seaman, Chris Flynn was named NCAA 1st team. In 1988 NCAA tournament, lost to Gary Gait led Syracuse team 11–10 in national semifinals, with Gait making the famous "Air Gait" jump shot from behind Penn's goal.
Penn Quakers (women)	2008	17-2	2008 Women's NCAA Division I tournament finalist, losing to Northwestern 10–6. Won Ivy league title, defeated number one Northwestern during the regular season.
Penn State Nittany Lions (women)	1978, 1979, 1980	45-1-3	Won 3 national collegiate (USWLA) championships in 1978, 1979 and 1980, defeating Maryland, Massachusetts and Maryland, with a 3-year total record of 45-1-3 under head coach Gillian Rattray.
Penn State Nittany Lions (women)	1987	17-2	Won the 1987 Women's NCAA Division I tournament with a record of 17–2, defeated Temple in title game 7–6, led by leading scorer Amanda Veal.
Penn State Nittany Lions (women)	1989	19-1	Won the 1989 Women's NCAA Division I tournament with a record of 19–1, defeated Harvard in title game 7–6, led by 1990 NCAA Player of the Year Diane Whipple.
Penn State Nittany Lions (men)	2019	16-2	Seeded No. 1 in the 2019 NCAA tournament, first ever Pennsylvania team to get the number one NCAA seeding in Men's lacrosse, second Pennsylvania based college to make men's lacrosse Division I Final Four.
Penn State Nittany Lions (men)	2023	11-5	Number 5 seed in the 2023 NCAA tournament, second Penn State team to make NCAA Final Four, lost semi-finals to Duke one minute into 1st overtime on a controversial in the crease play which ultimately resulted in NCAA rules changes.
Swarthmore Garnet	1953	9-1	One of the top teams during pre-NCAA season 1953. Led by National Lacrosse Hall of Famer Avery Blake Jr., one of the top all-time assist men Orville Wright and National Lacrosse Hall of Fame coach Avery Blake Sr., Swarthmore's lone loss that season was a 14–13 defeat to Johns Hopkins.
Temple Owls	1988	19-0	Won the 1988 Women's NCAA Division I tournament going undefeated, defeating Penn State 15–7, led by National Lacrosse Hall of Famer Amanda O'Leary. O'Leary also won NCAA Player of the Year.

= Won NCAA/USWLA Title
= National Title Finalist

Notable College teams from Pennsylvania - Sources

== See also ==
- History of lacrosse
- List of the oldest lacrosse teams
- Pennsylvania Interscholastic Athletic Association
- United States Intercollegiate Lacrosse Association Champions
