= Ryan Taylor (basketball) =

American basketball player and coach

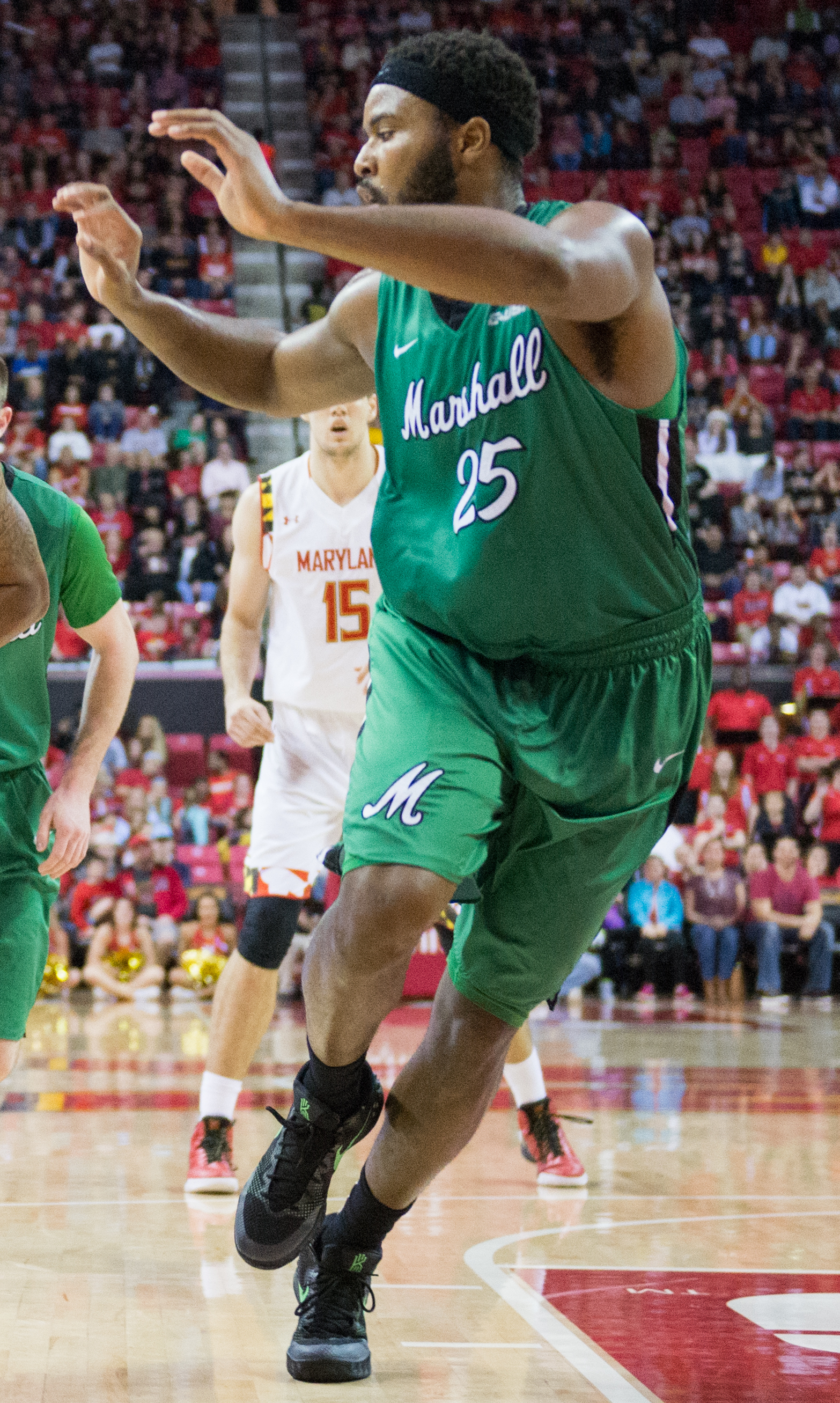
- Taylor with Marshall in 2015

Personal information
- Born: June 18, 1992 (age 34) Indianapolis, Indiana
- Listed height: 6 ft 5 in (1.96 m)
- Listed weight: 249 lb (113 kg)

Career information
- High school: Hargrave Military (Chatham, Virginia)
- College: Marshall (2013–2017)
- NBA draft: 2017: undrafted
- Playing career: 2017–2019
- Position: Power forward

Career history
- 2017–2018: ÍR
- 2019: Indianapolis Blaze

Career highlights
- CBA champion (2019); 2× Third-team All-C-USA (2015, 2017); C-USA All-Defensive Team (2017); C-USA All-Freshman Team (2014)

Ryan Taylor (born June 18, 1992) is an American former professional basketball player. He played college basketball for the Marshall Thundering Herd before playing a season in Iceland with Íþróttafélag Reykjavíkur and a season in the CBA with the Indianapolis Blaze.

== College career ==
Talyor joined Marshall in 2012 but redshirted his freshman year. He played 31 of 33 games in 2013–2014, starting 29 games and averaging 12.8 points and team leading 7.2 rebounds. In 2014–2015 he led Marshall in scoring and rebounding, with 14.1 points and 8.6 rebounds per game, and was selected to the All-Conference USA Third Team. In November 2016, Taylor was suspended by coach Dan D'Antoni for one game after he had been ejected from Marshalls 71–61 victory over Jackson State. Taylor had fouled out in the game and had continued to berate the referee from the bench, leading to his ejection. On January 10, 2017, Taylor was named the Oscar Robertson National Player of the Week after he averaged 25.3 points and 13.3 rebounds in Marshall's three victories during the week of January 2–7. During the season he passed Dan D'Antoni and Mike D'Antoni on Marshalls all-time scoring list and became the 50th player to break the 1000 point barrier in the schools history. In 2017 he became the first Marshall player to reach career totals of 1,500 points, 800 rebounds and 250 assists.

== Professional career ==
Taylor signed with Úrvalsdeild karla club ÍR in September 2017. He quickly established himself as one of the top players in the country and in December 2017, he was named the best player of the first half of the season. On March 5, Taylor made the game saving block on Haukar's Haukur Óskarsson three point attempt at the buzzer in ÍR's 64–62 victory. During the regular season, he averaged team highs of 21.9 points and 10.4 rebounds in 22 games.

ÍR ended the regular season with the second best record in the league and faced Stjarnan in the first round of the playoffs. In the third game of the series on March 22, Taylor struck Stjarnan's center, Hlynur Bæringsson, in the back of the head which resulted in Hlynur getting a concussion and missing both the rest of the game and the rest of the playoffs. As the referees did not see the hit clearly, Taylor was not ejected from the game and ÍR won a 67–64 victory. Two days later, Taylor received a three-game suspension from the league for the hit. Without Taylor, ÍR managed to edge out victory in the fourth game with a 24-point, 21-rebound performance by Danero Thomas, winning the series 3–1. Taylor returned in the third game of ÍR's semi-finals series against Tindastóll. After splitting the first two games, Tindastóll went on to win the next two, eliminating ÍR 3–1 from the playoffs.

In 2019, he played for the Indianapolis Blaze in the Central Basketball Association where he helped the team to the CBA championship. In 5 games for the Blaze, Taylor averaged 11.0 points and 7.2 rebounds per game.

=== The Basketball Tournament ===
In July 2018, Taylor played for the West Virginia Wildcats in The Basketball Tournament (TBT), a winner-take-all $2 million, single-elimination event. He had a double-double, 16 points and 10 rebounds, in the Wildcats first game, an 114–87 victory against 17th-seeded Charlotte Chess Center on July 20. The following day he led the team with 18 points and 11 rebounds but was unable to prevent a 99–68 loss against Scarlet & Gray, a team of mostly Ohio State men's basketball alumni, which knocked them out of the tournament. Taylor has subsequently played for Herd That, a team rostered primarily with Marshall alumni. (Note: Two players named Ryan Taylor have played in TBT: forward Ryan Taylor who attended Marshall, and guard Ryan Taylor who attended Ohio, Evansville, and Northwestern. The first Ryan Taylor is the subject of this article; the second Ryan Taylor won TBT's three-point shooting contest in July 2022.)

== Coaching career ==
In 2019, Taylor was named the head boys' basketball coach at St. Joseph Central Catholic High School in Huntington, West Virginia.

In 2026, Taylor was promoted to assistant coach for the Marshall Thundering Herd men's basketball team. He previously served as the director of player development under coach Cornelius Jackson and served as assistant director of basketball operations for two season under Dan D'Antoni all with the Herd.
