= Richie Meade =

Playing career
- 1973–1974: Nassau C.C.
- 1975–1976: North Carolina
- Position: Attackman

Coaching career (HC unless noted)
- 1978: Duke (asst.)
- 1979: North Carolina (asst.)
- 1980–1983: U. of Baltimore
- 1984–1988: Navy (DC)
- 1989–1990: North Carolina (OC)
- 1991–1994: Army (OC)
- 1995–2011: Navy
- 2012–2020: Furman

Head coaching record
- Overall: 158–103

Accomplishments and honors

Championships
- 2004 Patriot League Tournament Championship; 2005 Patriot League Tournament Championship; 2006 Patriot League Tournament Championship; 2007 Patriot League Tournament Championship; 2009 Patriot League Tournament Championship

Awards
- 2004 USILA Coach of the Year; 2004 and 2009 Patriot League Coach of the Year

Richie Meade (born c. 1955) is an American college lacrosse coach and the former head coach at Furman University. Prior to coaching at Furman, he was the head coach of the Navy lacrosse team at the United States Naval Academy and at the University of Baltimore until they discontinued their athletics program. Meade was an assistant coach at Duke University, the University of North Carolina, and the United States Military Academy.

== Early life and college ==
A native of Williston Park, New York, Meade attended and played lacrosse at Nassau Community College on Long Island. He then transferred to the University of North Carolina at Chapel Hill, from which he graduated with a B.A. in 1976. Meade earned an M.S. from North Carolina in 1979.

== Coaching career ==
After a stint as an assistant coach for Duke, Meade became an assistant coach at his alma mater in 1979. The following year, he took over as the head coach of the University of Baltimore lacrosse team. He served in that position until 1983, when the school ended its athletics program, and amassed a 27–23 record. Meade then went to the United States Naval Academy, where he worked as an assistant professor of physical education and an assistant coach and defensive coordinator for the Navy lacrosse team. In 1989, he returned to North Carolina as offensive coordinator and attackmen and midfielders coach. Meade then served as offensive coordinator and attackmen coach for the Army lacrosse team at the United States Military Academy.

In 1995, Meade returned to Navy as its seventh head lacrosse coach. Meade has guided Navy to seven NCAA tournament appearances and five Patriot League tournament championships.

In 2008, Meade, along with UMBC head coach Don Zimmerman, was a candidate for the North Carolina head position after John Haus was fired, but Meade said he was not interested. Meade resigned as Navy's coach on May 9, 2011.

In 2012, Meade accepted a position as Furman's head men's lacrosse coach. His tenure with the Paladins ended on May 18, 2020 when the university eliminated the men's lacrosse program due to COVID-19 pandemic budgetary costs.
