= Brian Christopher (lacrosse) =

American lacrosse player

Personal information
- Nationality: American
- Born: June 16, 1987 (age 38) Springfield, Pennsylvania, U.S.
- Height: 5 ft 11 in (180 cm)
- Weight: 190 lb (86 kg; 13 st 8 lb)

Sport
- Position: Midfield
- Shoots: Right
- MLL team: Denver Outlaws

Career highlights
- 2007 NCAA Championship; 2008 NCAA Finalist; 2009 USILA 3rd Team All American

Brian Christopher (born June 16, 1987), of Springfield, Pennsylvania, was an All American lacrosse player for Johns Hopkins University in Division I college lacrosse.

Christopher played for the Blue Jays from 2006 to 2009 helping the team to an NCAA Championship in 2007, an NCAA Finals in 2008, and was named third team All American.

Over the Blue Jays final four games in 2009 Christopher scored the game winning overtime goals in three of those games including Hopkins' 2009 quarterfinal overtime 12–11 win over Brown. The Denver Outlaws selected Christopher with the fourteenth pick of the 2009 MLL draft. He was subsequently picked up by Toronto Nationals in the 2011 supplemental draft.

== Statistics ==
=== Johns Hopkins University ===
Season	GP	G	A	Pts	PPG
2006	14	13	3	16	--
2007	17	10	1	11	--
2008	17	6	5	11	--
2009	15	30	11	41	--
Totals	69	59	20	79	--

== See also ==
- Lacrosse in Pennsylvania
- 2007 NCAA Division I Men's Lacrosse Championship
