= Baltimore Shuckers =

Defunct American basketball team

- Founded: 2011
- Folded: 2020
- League: APBL (2011-2016); CBA (2016-2020)
- Team history: Bay Area Shuckers (2011-2016); Baltimore Shuckers (2016-2020)
- Based in: Severn, Maryland
- Arena: Annapolis Area Christian School
- Colors: Navy Blue, Orange, Battleship Gray, and White
- Owner: Bay Area Sports, LLC
- Head coach: Llewellyn Smalley
- General manager: John Wolfe
- Championships: 0
- Division titles: 2

The Baltimore Shuckers were a minor league basketball team. The Shuckers competed in the Central Basketball Association and the American Professional Basketball League. The team ceased operations at the end of December 2020 due to the COVID-19 pandemic.

== History ==
Formerly a member of the American Professional Basketball League (APBL), the Shuckers completed their first season in 2011-2012 as members of the Atlantic Coast Professional Basketball League (ACPBL). Before the start of the 2012-2013 season the ACPBL was renamed to the APBL. After five seasons in the APBL the Shuckers announced they were moving to the Central Basketball Association for the 2017 season and re-branding the team to the Baltimore Shuckers.

Based in Severn, Maryland, the Shuckers play their home games on the campus of Annapolis Area Christian School.

The Shuckers are named to honor the Chesapeake Bay area's oyster industry ("shucking" is a term for opening oysters).

=== 2011-2012 ===
After an 0-3 start, Head Coach Peter Corriero resigned and Bob Topp was named the new head coach of the Bay Area Shuckers on December 26, 2011. The Shuckers completed their inaugural regular season with a 6-8 regular season record. After earning a first round bye, they lost in the second round of the ACPBL playoffs, 129-109, to the Hartford Lightning. In their first season the Shuckers earned several honors. Guard Adrian Bowie was named Most Valuable Player of the ACPBL All-Star Game after leading the South to a 135-124 win on April 1, 2012, in Severn, MD. Bowie was also a 1st Team All-ACPBL selection and fellow Guard Terry Hosley, was a 3rd Team All-ACPBL selection. Shuckers General Manager John Wolfe was also named the ACPBL Executive of the Year.

=== 2012-2013 ===
The Shuckers completed their second season with a 10-6 record and won their first division title, by winning the Colonial Division championship. The Shuckers then hosted and won the team's first playoff victory by defeating the Winchester Storm 120-108. Bay Area then fell to the Rockville Victors 136-116 in the second round of the APBL playoffs. Following the season Danny Thompson was named 1st Team All-APBL and First Team All-Defense, while Terry Hosley was named 2nd Team All-APBL, and Gus Chase earned 3rd Team All-APBL honors.

=== 2013-2014 ===
Prior to the 2013-2014 Llewellyn Smalley was named the Shuckers Head Coach. The Shuckers raced out to a 9-1 start after a resounding 141-112 win over the Beltway Bombers on their way to an 11-4 regular season record. The 11th win, which was a club record, was set with a 133-91 victory over the NoVa Hawks. The Shuckers earned a first round playoff win at home versus the Nova Hawks 117-94 before falling in the second round at the Rockville Victors 120-118. Following the season Gus Chase earned All-APBL Third Team honors, while Terry Hosley and Danny Thompson were First Team honorable mention selections.

=== 2014-2015 ===
The Bay Area Shuckers welcomed back Llewellyn Smalley as Head Coach for a second season. Bay Area also hired the league's first full-time female assistant coach, Monique Washington during the season. After starting the year 1-4 the Shuckers set a team record by winning six straight games. The Shuckers won in the first round of the APBL Playoffs 131-130 on a three-point shot by with 4.5 seconds left to play to earn their fourth straight trip to the APBL Elite Eight, but fell the following week to the Rockville Victors, 136-117, to stop their bid for a Final Four trip. Following the season Devon Scott was awarded the APBL Outstanding Achievement and Sportsmanship Award and Curtis Massey was named 2nd Team All-APBL and Gus Chase was named 4th Team All-APBL. Massey was also named the APBL Clutch Performer of the Year.

=== 2015-2016 ===
The Shuckers raced out to a 5-1 start following a 108-99 win over the NoVa Hawks. They went 3-4 the rest of the schedule, but finished the season with another victory over the Hawks (85-74) to finish the season 8-5 and capture the APBL's Commonwealth Division. The Shuckers closed out their season with a 120-116 loss in the APBL playoffs to the Rockville Victors. Following the season Torey Fassett was named the APBL Clutch Performer of the Year and 1st Team All-APBL. In the off-season the team announced it was moving to the CBA and re-branding the team to Baltimore Shuckers.

=== 2017 ===
The Shuckers started their first season in the CBA with an 0-4 record following a 107-103 loss at the Bowling Green Hornets. The Shuckers then earned their first win in the CBA with an 84-74 victory over the Mississippi Eagles. Baltimore completed its season with a 3-1 run, including a victory in their season finale against the Fort Wayne Flite to finish the season 3-5. Following the season three Shuckers were named All-CBA: Torey Fassett was named a 1st Team All-Star, Damarius Cruz a 3rd Team All-Star, and Jermaine Bolden a 4th Team All-Star. During the offseason, Fassett, Bolden, and fellow Shucker Benny Iko signed to play professionally in Antigua.

=== 2018 ===
The Shuckers opened the 2018 season with a 110-80 loss at home to the Middle Tennessee Storm. After an 0-7 start, the Shuckers closed out the 2018 campaign with a home victory over the eventual champion, Fort Wayne Flite, 89-85 to finish 1-7. Following the season Kendall Allison and Antonio Wright were both named CBA All-Stars.

=== 2019 ===
The Shuckers started the 2019 season with a home win over the Memphis Rail Runners to open the season 1-0, but then lost seven straight to finish their second consecutive season 1-7.

== Season-by-season ==
Baltimore Shuckers
Season	Regular season		Postseason		
Season	Record	Win %	Record	Win %	Result
2011-2012 (ACPBL)	6-8	.428	0-1	.000	Round 1 Bye; Round 2 Lost vs. Hartford Lightning, 129-109
2012-2013 (APBL)	10-6	.625	1-1	.500	Round 1 Won vs. Winchester Storm, 120-108; Round 2 Lost vs. Rockville Victors, 136-116
2013-2014 (APBL)	11-5	.687	1-1	.500	Round 1 Won vs. NoVa Hawks, 117-93; Round 2 Lost vs. Rockville Victors, 120-118
2014-2015 (APBL)	8-7	.533	1-1	.500	Round 1 Won vs. Winchester Storm, 131-130 Round 2 Lost vs. Rockville Victors, 136-117
2015-2016 (APBL)	8-5	.615	0-1	.000	Round 1 Bye Round 2 Lost vs Rockville Victors, 120-116
2017 (CBA)	3-5	.375	0-0	.000	
2018 (CBA)	1-7	.125	0-0	.000	
2019 (CBA)	1-7	.125	0-0	.000	
Totals	47-43	.522	3-5	.375	0 Championships
