= Tri-City Suns =

American basketball team (2009–2011)

- Founded: 2009
- Folded: 2011
- League: ABA: 2009–2011; ACPBL: 2011
- Team history: Tri-City Suns (2009–2011)
- Based in: Temple Hills, Maryland
- Arena: Progressive Christian Academy
- Colors: Black, orange
- Owner: Charles Thompson; Monique Mathis
- Head coach: Tony Meeks
- Championships: 0
- Cheerleaders: TBD
- Dancers: TBD
- Mascot: TBD

The Tri-City Suns were a basketball team which played in the American Basketball Association (ABA) in the 2009–10 season and the Atlantic Coast Professional Basketball League (ACPBL) in 2011. Home games were played on the campus of Progressive Christian Academy in Temple Hills, Maryland.

The Suns were the only basketball team playing in Prince George's County. The Maryland Nighthawks played the 2004–05 season at The Show Place Arena in Upper Marlboro, but, prompted by poor attendance, moved to Rockville in Montgomery County the following season. In January 2011, the Suns were recruited to replace the Washington GreenHawks (formerly the same Maryland Nighthawks) in the ACPBL which would be renamed the American Professional Basketball League (APBL) the following season.

Despite a January 1, 2013, announcement that the Suns would play in the ABA's 2013–14 season, and an undated announcement that they'd play in the APBL for the 2013–14 season, no reliable source indicates that they played after their 2011 ACPBL season.
