= Gettysburg Bullets men's lacrosse =

- Founded: 1958
- University: Gettysburg College
- Head coach: Peter Toner (since 2022 season)
- Stadium: Musselman Stadium (capacity: 6,000)
- Location: Gettysburg, Pennsylvania
- Conference: Centennial Conference
- Nickname: Bullets
- Colors: Orange and blue

NCAA Tournament Runner-Up
- NCAA Division III - (3) 2001, 2002, 2009

NCAA Tournament Final Fours
- NCAA Division III - (11) 1994, 1995, 1997, 2001, 2002, 2007, 2008, 2009, 2015, 2016, 2018

NCAA Tournament Quarterfinals
- NCAA Division III - (12) 1989, 1991, 1992, 1993, 1996, 1998, 2000, 2004, 2005, 2006, 2022, 2025

NCAA Tournament appearances
- NCAA Division III - (29) 1989, 1991, 1992, 1993, 1994, 1995, 1996, 1997, 1998, 1999, 2000, 2001, 2002, 2004, 2005, 2006, 2007, 2008, 2009, 2010, 2011, 2012, 2015, 2016, 2018, 2019, 2022, 2023, 2025

Conference Tournament championships
- MAC Championships - (5) 1983, 1989, 1991, 1992, 1993 Centennial Conference Championships (10) - 2001, 2002, 2004, 2005, 2006, 2007, 2008, 2009, 2015, 2016

Conference regular season championships
- Centennial Conference Championships - (16) 1994, 1995, 1998, 1999, 2000, 2001, 2002, 2004, 2005, 2006, 2007, 2008, 2009, 2015, 2016, 2018, 2025

The Gettysburg Bullets men's lacrosse team represents Gettysburg College in National Collegiate Athletic Association (NCAA) Division III men's lacrosse.

== History ==
Gettysburg currently competes as a member of the Centennial Conference and plays their home games at Musselman Stadium.

During the NCAA era, Gettysburg has made 29 NCAA tournament appearances, with 11 Final Fours and 3 tournament runner-ups.

Gettysburg closest run at a championship was the 2009 national title game where they lost a close game to SUNY Cortland 9 to 7.

The Bullets have had 39 consecutive winning seasons, stretching from 1987 to 2025.

== Season results ==
The following is a list of Gettysburg's results by season as an NCAA Division III program during the NCAA era which began in 1974.

Season	Coach	Overall	Conference	Standing	Postseason
Joe Donolli (Middle Atlantic Conference) (1978–1987)
1978	Joe Donolli	8-5			
1979	Joe Donolli	5-7			
1980	Joe Donolli	9-4			
1981	Joe Donolli	8-6			
1982	Joe Donolli	6-6			
1983	Joe Donolli	11-5			
1984	Joe Donolli	6-9			
1985	Joe Donolli	10-5			
1986	Joe Donolli	4-6			
1987	Joe Donolli	7–6			
Joe Donolli:		108-99 (.522)			
Hank Janczyk (Middle Atlantic Conference) (1988–1993)
1988	Hank Janczyk	9-5			
1989	Hank Janczyk	12-3			NCAA Division III Quarterfinals
1990	Hank Janczyk	9-4			
1991	Hank Janczyk	12-2			NCAA Division III Quarterfinals
1992	Hank Janczyk	12-3			NCAA Division III Quarterfinals
1993	Hank Janczyk	9-4			NCAA Division III Quarterfinals
Hank Janczyk (Centennial) (1994–2021)
1994	Hank Janczyk	12-2	6-0		NCAA Division III Final Four
1995	Hank Janczyk	13-2	6-0		NCAA Division III Final Four
1996	Hank Janczyk	9-5	5-1		NCAA Division III Quarterfinals
1997	Hank Janczyk	11-5	4-2		NCAA Division III Final Four
1998	Hank Janczyk	11-5	6-0		NCAA Division III Quarterfinals
1999	Hank Janczyk	13-3	6-0		NCAA Division III First Round
2000	Hank Janczyk	14-2	6-0		NCAA Division III Quarterfinals
2001	Hank Janczyk	16-2	6-0		NCAA Division III Finals
2002	Hank Janczyk	17-2	6-0		NCAA Division III Finals
2003	Hank Janczyk	11-5	6-2		
2004	Hank Janczyk	14-4	7-1		NCAA Division III Quarterfinals
2005	Hank Janczyk	15-4	8-0		NCAA Division III Quarterfinals
2006	Hank Janczyk	17-2	8-0		NCAA Division III Quarterfinals
2007	Hank Janczyk	16-3	7-1		NCAA Division III Final Four
2008	Hank Janczyk	17-3	7-1		NCAA Division III Final Four
2009	Hank Janczyk	16-4	7-1		NCAA Division III Finals
2010	Hank Janczyk	15-3	8-0		NCAA Division III Second Round
2011	Hank Janczyk	12-7	6-2		NCAA Division III Second Round
2012	Hank Janczyk	11-7	6-2		NCAA Division III Second Round
2013	Hank Janczyk	9-7	5-3		
2014	Hank Janczyk	9-7	5-3		
2015	Hank Janczyk	20-1	8-0		NCAA Division III Final Four
2016	Hank Janczyk	17-3	8-0		NCAA Division III Final Four
2017	Hank Janczyk	11-6	6-2		
2018	Hank Janczyk	19-3	8-0		NCAA Division III Final Four
2019	Hank Janczyk	14-5	7-1		NCAA Division III Second Round
2020	Hank Janczyk	6-1	†	†	†
2021	Hank Janczyk	4-1	4-1		
Hank Janczyk:		432-126 (.774)	172-24 (.878)		
Peter Toner (Centennial) (2022–present)
2022	Peter Toner	14-8	6-2		NCAA Division III Quarterfinals
2023	Peter Toner	13-5	6-2		NCAA Division III 3rd round
2024	Peter Toner	10-8	4-4		
2025	Peter Toner	15-5	8-0		NCAA Division III Quarterfinals
Peter Toner:		52-26 (.667)	24-8 (.750)		
Total:		607-292-1 (.676)			
National champion Postseason invitational champion Conference regular season champion Conference regular season and conference tournament champion Division regular season champion Division regular season and conference tournament champion Conference tournament champion

†NCAA canceled 2020 collegiate activities due to the COVID-19 virus.

== See also ==
- Lacrosse in Pennsylvania
