= Ken Clausen =

American lacrosse player

Personal information
- Nationality: American
- Height: 74 in (190 cm)
- Weight: 195 lb (88 kg; 13 st 13 lb)

Sport
- Position: Defense
- MLL teams: Florida Launch
- NCAA team: University of Virginia

Career highlights
- 2008, 2009, 2010 NCAA Final Four; 2008, 2009, 2010 USILA 1st Team All American

Kenneth Clausen was an All American college lacrosse and former professional lacrosse player, defenseman.

Ken Clausen was the number one ranked defenseman and number ten overall recruit in the country according to Inside Lacrosse.

Originally committed to Duke University, Clausen reconsidered this decision after the Duke Lacrosse scandal.

On October 29, 2005, Clausen blocked Blair Academy student Kurt Socha out of bounds while playing American football, resulting in a loose helmet malfunction and subsequent mouth-guard choking, which resulted in the death of Socha despite immediate helicopter medivac response.

Clausen graduated from The Hill School in 2006.

During his senior year at the University of Virginia, Clausen started Lacrosse Mustache Madness which raises money for the HEADstrong Foundation.

Clausen was selected fifth overall in 2010 draft by the Denver Outlaws. He was acquired as a first round selection in the 2016 MLL Supplemental Draft by the Florida Launch.

== See also ==
- Virginia Cavaliers men's lacrosse
- Lacrosse in Pennsylvania
