= Ralph Davy =

"Rip" Davy
Personal information
- Nationality: American
- Born: 1957 Darien, Connecticut, U.S.
- Education: University of North Carolina at Chapel Hill

Sport
- Sport: Lacrosse
- Position: Defense

Ralph (Rip) Davy (born 1957) was a notable lacrosse player and coach, who played for the North Carolina Tar Heels men's lacrosse team from 1976 to 1979. Davy was a 1st team All-American defenseman playing under Willie Scroggs, and helped develop UNC lacrosse into a national power. Davy was UNC's first ever 1st team Division I All-American.

Davy was a Prep star at The Hill School in Pennsylvania, where he was a three-sport athlete and captained the football, wrestling and lacrosse teams his senior year. One of the early power lacrosse schools in Pennsylvania, Davy reached the Pennsylvania state finals in 1973.

After graduation from UNC, Davy went on to coach lacrosse in Manchester, as well as for the Oxford University team.

Davy's brother Brett Davy also played lacrosse at UNC from 1986 to 1989.

He was inducted into the Pennsylvania Lacrosse Hall of Fame in 2000.

- Awards = 1979 First Team All-American

== See also ==
- Lacrosse in Pennsylvania
