= Face-Off Classic =

The Konica Minolta Face-Off Classic is an annual college lacrosse event played in Baltimore, Maryland early in the NCAA Division I season. From 2007 to 2009, the event consisted of a doubleheader; in 2010 it was expanded to include a third game. The event takes place in M&T Bank Stadium, the home field of the Baltimore Ravens of the National Football League, and it was first held 2007. The event is hosted by the manufacturer Konica Minolta. The inaugural Face-Off Classic in 2007 set the attendance record for a regular season lacrosse-only event with 20,130 spectators. That was broken by the 2009 Big City Classic. The event was not held in 2014.

== Results ==
Year	Date	Winning team		Losing team		Notes	Attendance
2013	Saturday, March 23	Colgate	11	Navy	3		10,487
2013	Saturday, March 23	Johns Hopkins	15	Virginia	8		10,487
2012	Saturday, March 10	North Carolina	9	Princeton	8		17,138
2012	Saturday, March 10	Virginia	9	Cornell	8	OT	17,138
2012	Saturday, March 10	Johns Hopkins	12	UMBC	5		17,138
2011	Saturday, March 12	Syracuse	9	Georgetown	8	OT	17,057
2011	Saturday, March 12	Virginia	11	Cornell	9		17,057
2011	Saturday, March 12	Johns Hopkins	16	UMBC	5		17,057
2010	Saturday, March 6	Maryland	11	Duke	10	OT	19,742
2010	Saturday, March 6	Princeton	11	Johns Hopkins	10	OT	19,742
2010	Saturday, March 6	Notre Dame	11	Loyola	9		19,742
2009	Saturday, February 28	Princeton	14	Johns Hopkins	8		17,119
2009	Saturday, February 28	Maryland	11	Duke	8		17,119
2008	Saturday, March 1	Johns Hopkins	14	Princeton	9		19,165
2008	Saturday, March 1	Virginia	14	Syracuse	13	OT	19,165
2007	Saturday, March 3	Johns Hopkins	7	Princeton	6	2OT	20,180
2007	Saturday, March 3	Virginia	11	Syracuse	8		20,180

== See also ==
- Big City Classic, an NCAA men's lacrosse tournament held annually at Meadowlands Stadium in East Rutherford, New Jersey
