= Avery Blake =

American lacrosse player and coach

Biographical details
- Born: April 8, 1907
- Died: August 25, 1975 (aged 68); Long Beach Township, New Jersey, U.S.

Playing career

Lacrosse
- 1925–1928: Swarthmore

Coaching career (HC unless noted)

Football
- 1945: Swarthmore

Lacrosse
- 1931–1959: Swarthmore
- 1960–1969: Penn

Head coaching record
- Overall: 4–3–1 (football); 246–153–3 (lacrosse)

Accomplishments and honors

Awards
- National Lacrosse Hall of Fame (1961); F. Morris Touchstone Award (1969)

Avery Felton Blake Sr. (April 8, 1907 – August 25, 1975) was an American college lacrosse player and coach. He served as the head lacrosse coach at his alma mater, Swarthmore College from 1931 to 1959. Blake also served as president of the United States Intercollegiate Lacrosse Association. He was inducted into the National Lacrosse Hall of Fame in 1961 and is the father of National Lacrosse Hall of Fame player Avery Blake Jr.

== Early life ==
Blake was raised in Baltimore, Maryland. He attended Baltimore Polytechnic Institute, from which he graduated in 1925. He then went on to college at the Swarthmore College in 1925. While there, he played lacrosse and served as the lacrosse team's captain and student coach as a senior. Blake graduated from Swarthmore in 1928 with a Bachelor of Science degree.

== Coach at Swarthmore and Penn ==
Blake was Swarthmore's 18th lacrosse coach. The Garnett started up the sport in 1891 and were voted National Champions in 1900, 1904, 1905 and 1910. Following early success in the game, Blake was able to elevate his team to the level of those turn-of-the-century Swarthmore teams. In 29 seasons, Swarthmore under Blake won or shared eight Pennsylvania league titles. The 1941 team lost only one game, that being to eventual National Champion Johns Hopkins. The 1953 squad had the distinction of winning the USILA Class "B" National title, also losing just one game, to Hopkins.

Blake coached his son Avery, Jr., also an inductee into the National Lacrosse Hall of Fame, on these teams.

Blake, after Swarthmore, went on to coach at Penn, retiring just prior to the move by college lacrosse to the NCAA tournament format.

== Later life and honors ==
After his coaching tenure at Swarthmore, Blake remained active in the sport of lacrosse serving in an various administrative and rule-setting capacities. In 1960 he joined the staff of University of Pennsylvania as an assistant football coach. In Bob Scott's well-known lacrosse tome, Lacrosse: Technique and Tradition, he credited Blake with being the "first to popularize the zone defense". Blake died in 1975.

The National Lacrosse Hall of Fame inducted Blake in 1961. He is also a member of the Pennsylvania Lacrosse Hall of Fame

== Head coaching record ==
=== Football ===
Year	Team	Overall	Conference	Standing	Bowl/playoffs
Swarthmore Garnet Tide (Independent) (1945)
1945	Swarthmore	4–3–1			
Swarthmore:		4–3–1			
Total:		4–3–1			

== See also ==
- Lacrosse in Pennsylvania
