= Day of Rivals =

Annual college lacrosse double-header in Baltimore, Maryland, US

The Smartlink Day of Rivals is an annual college lacrosse double-header event played in Baltimore, Maryland, USA, between two pairs of traditional rivals. The event takes place in M&T Bank Stadium, the home field of the Baltimore Ravens of the National Football League. The first event took place on April 11, 2009, between the Johns Hopkins–Maryland and Army–Navy games, the two most intense and storied lacrosse rivalries. The 2010 event featured the same match-ups with a total attendance of 20,911.

Johns Hopkins declined to extend its contract with the event for the 2011 edition, and will instead play Maryland at Homewood Field. Similarly, the Army–Navy game will be held at Annapolis in 2011 instead.

== Results ==
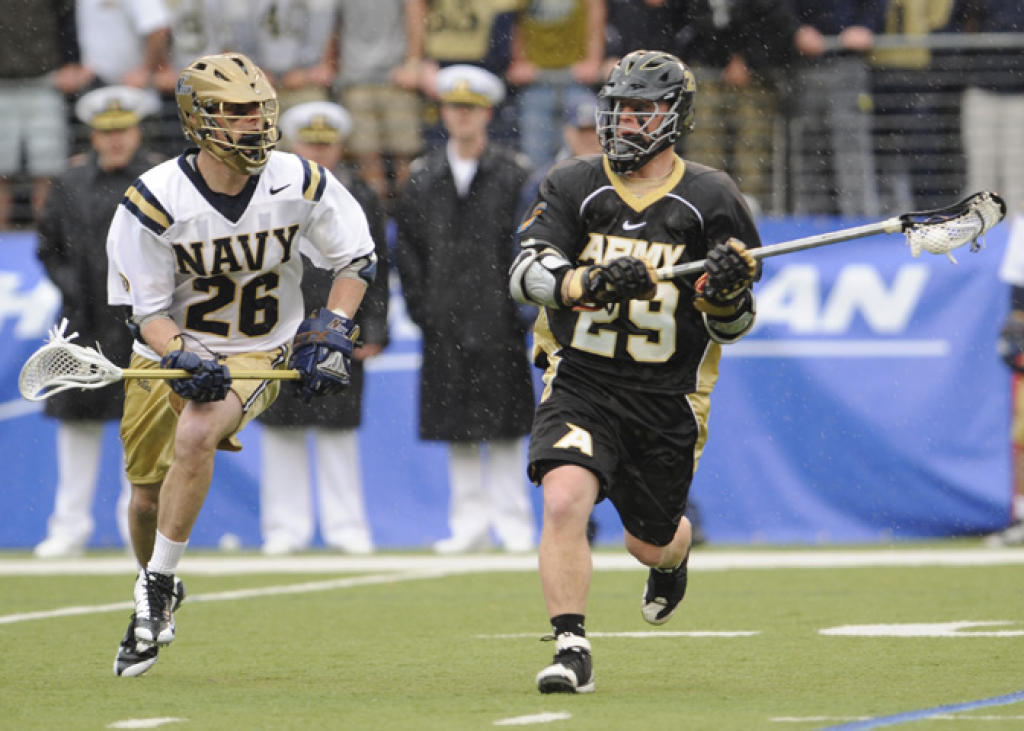
Army and Navy in action during the 2009 Day of Rivals.

Date	Winning team		Losing team	
April 11, 2009	12 Navy	8	Army	4
April 11, 2009	9 Johns Hopkins	10	13 Maryland	9
April 17, 2010	Army	7	Navy	6
April 17, 2010	4 Maryland	10	16 Johns Hopkins	9

== See also ==
- List of college lacrosse events
