= Navy Midshipmen men's lacrosse =

NCAA Division I men's lacrosse team

- Founded: 1908
- University: United States Naval Academy
- Head coach: Joe Amplo (since 2020 season)
- Stadium: Navy–Marine Corps Memorial Stadium (capacity: 34,000)
- Location: Annapolis, Maryland
- Conference: Patriot League
- Nickname: Midshipmen
- Colors: Navy blue and gold

Pre-NCAA era championships
- (17) - 1928, 1929, 1938, 1943, 1945, 1946, 1949, 1954, 1960, 1961, 1962, 1963, 1964, 1965, 1966, 1967, 1970

NCAA Tournament Runner-Up
- (2) - 1975, 2004

NCAA Tournament Final Fours
- (8) - 1971, 1975, 1976, 1977, 1978, 1979, 1981, 2004

NCAA Tournament Quarterfinals
- (20) - 1971, 1972, 1973, 1974, 1975, 1976, 1977, 1978, 1979, 1980, 1981, 1982, 1986, 1987, 1988, 1989, 2004, 2005, 2008, 2016

NCAA Tournament appearances
- (27) - 1971, 1972, 1973, 1974, 1975, 1976, 1977, 1978, 1979, 1980, 1981, 1982, 1986, 1987, 1988, 1989, 1992, 1993, 1994, 1999, 2004, 2005, 2006, 2007, 2008, 2009, 2016

Conference Tournament championships
- (5) - 2004, 2005, 2006, 2007, 2009

Conference regular season championships
- (8) - 2004, 2005, 2006, 2007, 2008, 2015, 2016, 2018

The Navy Midshipmen men's lacrosse team represents the United States Naval Academy in National Collegiate Athletic Association (NCAA) Division I men's lacrosse. Navy currently competes as a member of the Patriot League and play their home games at Navy–Marine Corps Memorial Stadium in Annapolis, Maryland. During the 20th century, the Midshipmen secured 17 national championships, including 2 United States Intercollegiate Lacrosse Association titles and 15 Wingate Memorial Trophy awards. During the 1960s, a period of dominance for the Midshipmen, they won eight consecutive titles. The program's main rivals include Army, Maryland, and Johns Hopkins.

== History ==
Lacrosse began at the Naval Academy in 1908 when two former Johns Hopkins players, Frank Breyer and Bill Hudgins, volunteered to help form a team. On April 4, they played their first game, against their co-founders' alma mater, which they lost, 1–6. In 1911, George Finlayson took over as head coach and a year later led Navy to its first undefeated season. The start of the First World War caused a cancellation of the 1917 season after just two games, but also marked the start of seven season undefeated streak. From mid-season in 1916 to the final game of 1923, Navy won 45 consecutive games.

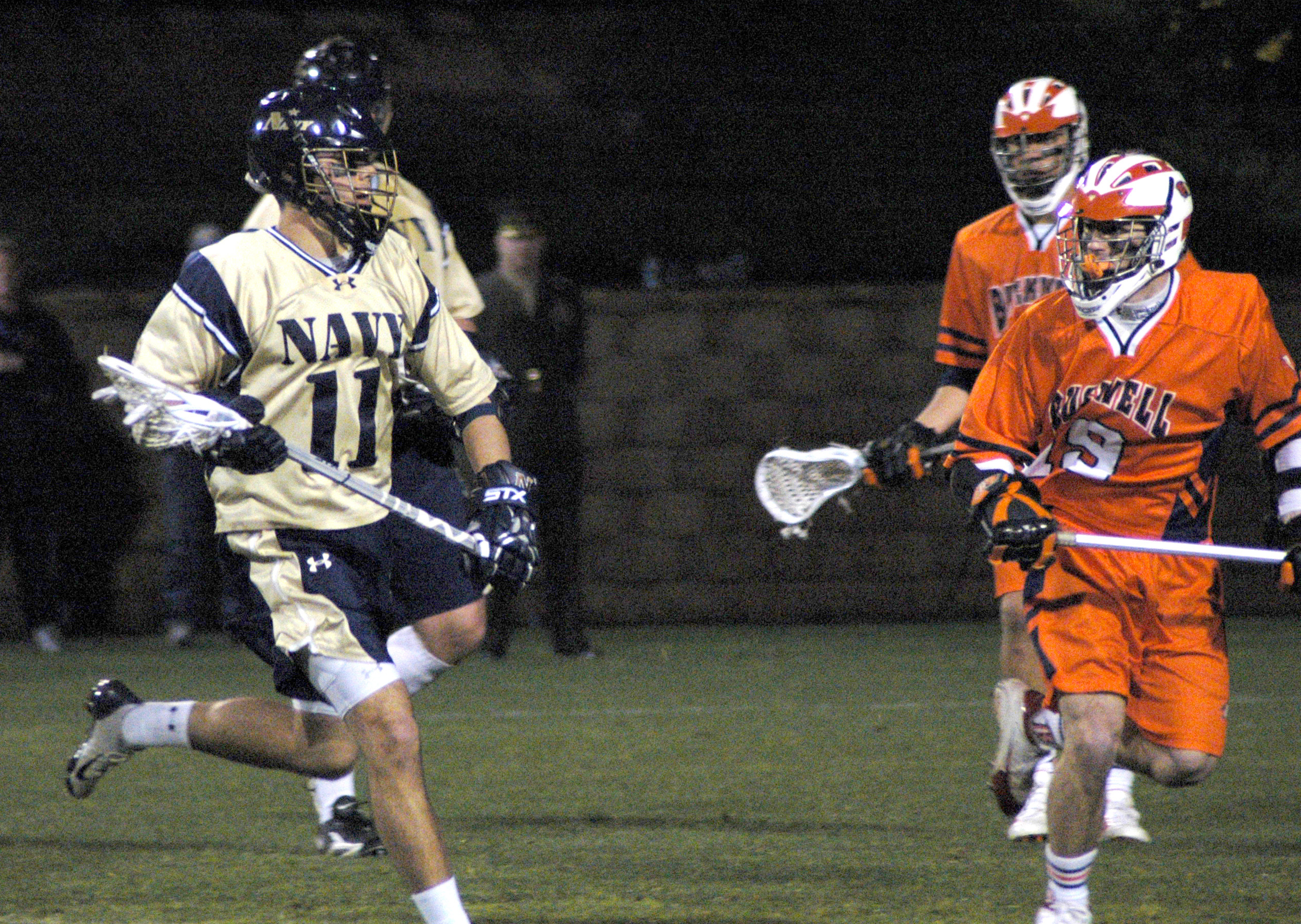
Navy playing Bucknell in the 2006 First 4.

The founder of the lacrosse program at cross-city rival St. John's, William "Dinty" Moore became the Navy head coach in 1936. He remained at the helm for 23 years, during which time he helped Navy compile six national championships.

In April 1941 Navy superintendent Rear Admiral Russell Wilson refused to allow the team to play a visiting team from Harvard University because the Harvard team included a black player. Harvard's athletic director ordered the player home and the game was played on April 4, as scheduled, which Navy won 12-0.

In 1945, the Midshipmen hosted their arch-rival Army for the traditional final game of the season. The teams fought to a stalemate, and after two overtime periods, finished the season as national co-champions.

In 1959, Willis Bilderback, a Rutgers alumnus, took over the program and led Navy to their "Decade of Dominance". During the 1960s, in large part due to a stifling defense and talented Hall of Fame attackman Jimmy Lewis, the Midshipmen compiled a 96–14-1 record (.865) and won eight consecutive national championships, including six outright. Health problems forced Bilderback to retire after the 1972 season.

He was replaced by Dick Szlasa, who coached Navy to ten consecutive NCAA tournament appearances. Bryan Matthews took over in 1983, and Richie Meade replaced him in turn in 1995. Navy became a member of a conference for the first time in 2000 when it joined the Eastern College Athletic Conference (ECAC) Lacrosse League. In 2004, they left the ECAC to join the Patriot League. The Midshipmen have finished first outright or tied for first every year of their membership, from 2004 to 2009. Navy has also won the Patriot League tournament five of those six years.

== Championships ==
Starting in 1926, the United States Intercollegiate Lacrosse Association (USILA) began rating college lacrosse teams and awarding gold medals to the top teams. Navy was the recipient of one of these in 1928, alongside Johns Hopkins, Maryland, and Rutgers — each of which had only one regular-season collegiate defeat. From 1936 through 1970, the USILA awarded the Wingate Memorial Trophy to the annual champion, based on regular-season records. In 1971, the NCAA began hosting an annual men's tournament to determine the national champion. The Wingate Memorial Trophy was presented to the first two NCAA Division I champions (1971 and 1972) and was then retired. Navy has won 17 national championships:

Year	National championships	Coach	Record
1928	USILA Gold Medal (with Johns Hopkins, Maryland, and Rutgers)	George Finlayson	7–1–1
1929	USILA Championship	George Finlayson	9–0–0
1938	USILA Championship	William "Dinty" Moore	7–0–0
1943	USILA Championship	William "Dinty" Moore	7–1–0
1945	USILA Co-Championship (with Army)	William "Dinty" Moore	6–2–1
1946	USILA Championship	William "Dinty" Moore	8–2–0
1949	USILA Co-Championship (with Johns Hopkins)	William "Dinty" Moore	11–0–0
1954	USILA Championship	William "Dinty" Moore	10–0–0
1960	USILA Championship	Willis Bilderback	10–1–0
1961	USILA Co-Championship (with Army)	Willis Bilderback	9–2–0
1962	USILA Championship	Willis Bilderback	10–1–0
1963	USILA Championship	Willis Bilderback	8–1–0
1964	USILA Championship	Willis Bilderback	10–0–0
1965	USILA Championship	Willis Bilderback	12–0–0
1966	USILA Championship	Willis Bilderback	11–1–0
1967	USILA Co-Championship (with Maryland and Johns Hopkins)	Willis Bilderback	9–2–0
1970	USILA Co-Championship (with Johns Hopkins and Virginia)	Willis Bilderback	11–1–0

== Season results ==
The following is a list of Navy's results by season as an NCAA Division I program:

Season	Coach	Overall	Conference	Standing	Postseason
Willis Bilderback (Independent) (1959–1972)
1971	Willis Bilderback	10–4			NCAA Division I Final Four
1972	Willis Bilderback	8–4			NCAA Division I Quarterfinals
Willis Bilderback:		131–26–2 (.830)			
Dick Szlasa (Independent) (1973–1982)
1973	Dick Szlasa	8–5			NCAA Division I Quarterfinals
1974	Dick Szlasa	7–5			NCAA Division I Quarterfinals
1975	Dick Szlasa	10–5			NCAA Division I Runner–Up
1976	Dick Szlasa	10–3			NCAA Division I Final Four
1977	Dick Szlasa	10–5			NCAA Division I Final Four
1978	Dick Szlasa	11–3			NCAA Division I Final Four
1979	Dick Szlasa	9–4			NCAA Division I Final Four
1980	Dick Szlasa	7–4			NCAA Division I Quarterfinals
1981	Dick Szlasa	7–5			NCAA Division I Final Four
1982	Dick Szlasa	6–5			NCAA Division I Quarterfinals
Dick Szlasa:		85–44 (.659)			
Bryan Matthews (Independent) (1983–1994)
1983	Bryan Matthews	5–6			
1984	Bryan Matthews	6–6			
1985	Bryan Matthews	5–6			
1986	Bryan Matthews	8–4			NCAA Division I Quarterfinals
1987	Bryan Matthews	9–4			NCAA Division I Quarterfinals
1988	Bryan Matthews	8–5			NCAA Division I Quarterfinals
1989	Bryan Matthews	8–5			NCAA Division I Quarterfinals
1990	Bryan Matthews	7–4			
1991	Bryan Matthews	5–6			
1992	Bryan Matthews	8–5			NCAA Division I First Round
1993	Bryan Matthews	8–4			NCAA Division I First Round
1994	Bryan Matthews	7–6			NCAA Division I First Round
Bryan Matthews:		84–61 (.579)			
Richie Meade (Independent) (1995–1999)
1995	Richie Meade	6–6			
1996	Richie Meade	4–8			
1997	Richie Meade	6–6			
1998	Richie Meade	7–6			
1999	Richie Meade	7–7			NCAA Division I First Round
Richie Meade (ECAC Lacrosse League) (2000–2003)
2000	Richie Meade	9–4	5–1	2nd	
2001	Richie Meade	8–5	4–2	3rd	
2002	Richie Meade	8–5	3–2	3rd	
2003	Richie Meade	6–7	1–4	T–5th	
Richie Meade (Patriot League) (2004–2011)
2004	Richie Meade	15–3	7–0	1st	NCAA Division I Runner–Up
2005	Richie Meade	12–4	5–1	T–1st	NCAA Division I Quarterfinals
2006	Richie Meade	11–4	5–1	T–1st	NCAA Division I First Round
2007	Richie Meade	11–4	6–0	1st	NCAA Division I First Round
2008	Richie Meade	10–6	5–1	T–1st	NCAA Division I Quarterfinals
2009	Richie Meade	11–5	4–2	3rd	NCAA Division I First Round
2010	Richie Meade	7–8	4–2	2nd	
2011	Richie Meade	4–9	2–4	5th	
Richie Meade:		142–97 (.594)	51–20 (.718)		
Rick Sowell (Patriot League) (2012–2019)
2012	Rick Sowell	6–6	3–3	T–4th	
2013	Rick Sowell	3–10	1–5	6th	
2014	Rick Sowell	4–10	3–5	6th	
2015	Rick Sowell	9–5	6–2	T–1st	
2016	Rick Sowell	11–5	7–1	T–1st	NCAA Division I Quarterfinals
2017	Rick Sowell	6–8	4–4	T–4th	
2018	Rick Sowell	9–5	7–1	T–1st	
2019	Rick Sowell	6–7	4–4	T–5th	
Rick Sowell:		54–56 (.491)	35–25 (.583)		
Joe Amplo (Patriot League) (2020–Present)
2020	Joe Amplo	3–2	1–1	†	†
2021	Joe Amplo	6–3	4–2	T–3rd	
2022	Joe Amplo	9–6	5–3	T–4th	
2023	Joe Amplo	8–8	5–3	4th	
2024	Joe Amplo	9–7	5–3	T–3rd	
2025	Joe Amplo	8–7	4–4	T-4th	
2026	Joe Amplo	7–7	3–5	7th	
Joe Amplo:		53–42 (.558)	27–21 (.563)		
Total:		854–404–14 (.679)			
National champion Postseason invitational champion Conference regular season champion Conference regular season and conference tournament champion Division regular season champion Division regular season and conference tournament champion Conference tournament champion

†NCAA canceled 2020 collegiate activities due to the COVID-19 virus.

== Head coaches ==
- Frank Breyer & Bill Hudgins (1908–1910)
- George Finlayson (1911–1935)
- William "Dinty" Moore (1936–1958)
- Willis Bilderback (1959–1972)
- Dick Szlasa (1973–1982)
- Bryan Matthews (1983–1994)
- Richie Meade (1995–2011)
- Rick Sowell (2012–2019)
- Joe Amplo (2020-

== MacLaughlin Award ==
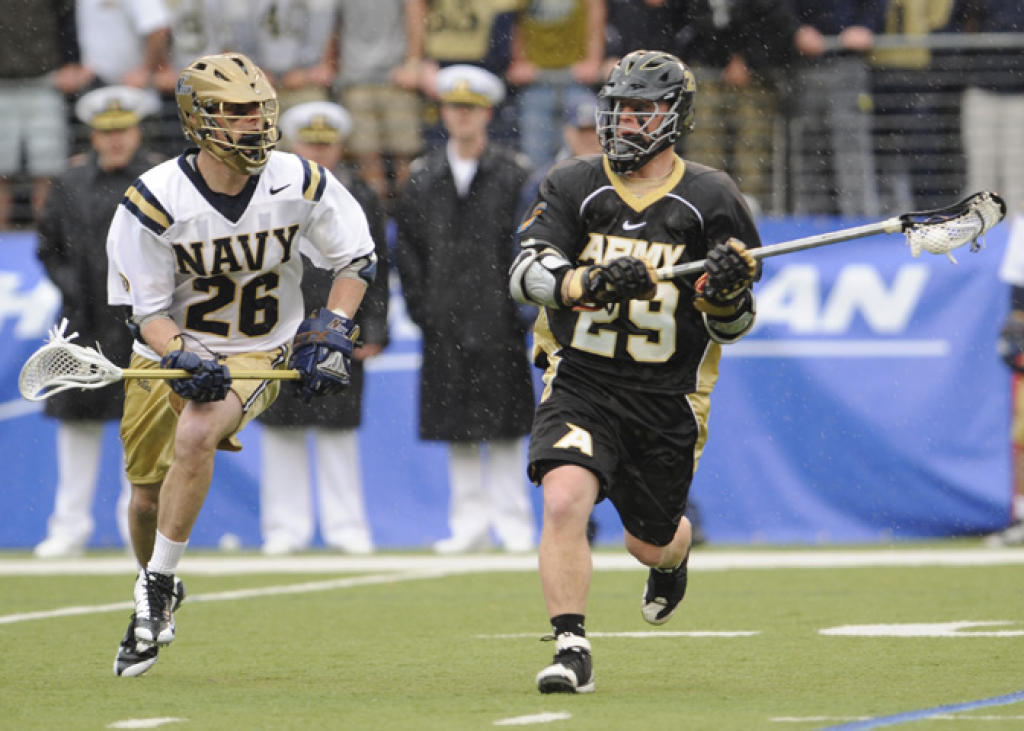
Navy and Army players in action during the 2009 Day of Rivals.

The Lt. Donald MacLaughlin Jr. Award has been given annually since 1973 by the United States Intercollegiate Lacrosse Association (USILA) to the nation's most outstanding midfielders in NCAA Division I, Division II, and Division III. The award is named for Lt. (j.g.) Donald MacLaughlin Jr. (Class of 1963), an All-American Navy midfielder who died on a combat mission in South Vietnam in 1966.

== Notable players ==
- Jimmy Lewis

== Athletic Hall of Fame ==
For lacrosse players in the USNA Athletic Hall of Fame, see footnote
