= Big City Classic =

College lacrosse event

The Inside Lacrosse Big City Classic was an annual college lacrosse triple-header event played in East Rutherford, New Jersey from 2009 to 2013. It was held at first at Giants Stadium and then MetLife Stadium, the home fields of the NFL's New York Giants and New York Jets and is sponsored by the Baltimore-based magazine, Inside Lacrosse.

The inaugural edition took place on April 4, 2009 at Giants Stadium, and featured six teams that possessed a combined 67 NCAA tournament semifinals appearances and 24 NCAA championships. One of the participants, Syracuse, was the defending national championship team.

The 2009 Big City Classic set the attendance record for a regular season lacrosse-only event with 22,308 spectators. This exceeded the previous-record 20,130 fans that attended the 2007 Face-Off Classic in Baltimore, and also surpassed the expected crowd of 15,000 to 20,000. In 2008, 29,601 fans attended the Ohio State–Denver lacrosse match, but it also featured a spring football scrimmage, and therefore was not a lacrosse-only event. The second Big City Classic in 2010 was the inaugural event at MetLife Stadium (then New Meadowlands Stadium) and featured the same six teams and broke last years attendance mark, with 25,710 attending.

There was a shakeup in the lineup for the 2011 classic as only Syracuse and UNC remained in the lineup. In order to attract a more local audience, the first game featured New Jersey–based Rutgers and St. John's, which is located in New York City. Johns Hopkins joined the lineup, playing North Carolina, and Duke played in the nightcap against Syracuse. This change did not greatly affect the attendance, however, as 25,145 arrived for the games.

The 2012 Big City classic once again has a lineup change, as Rutgers will not return to the event, having lost to St. John's 9-8 in the 2011 game. They will be replaced by Notre Dame, making their Classic debut. The games took place on April 1, 2012.

== Results ==
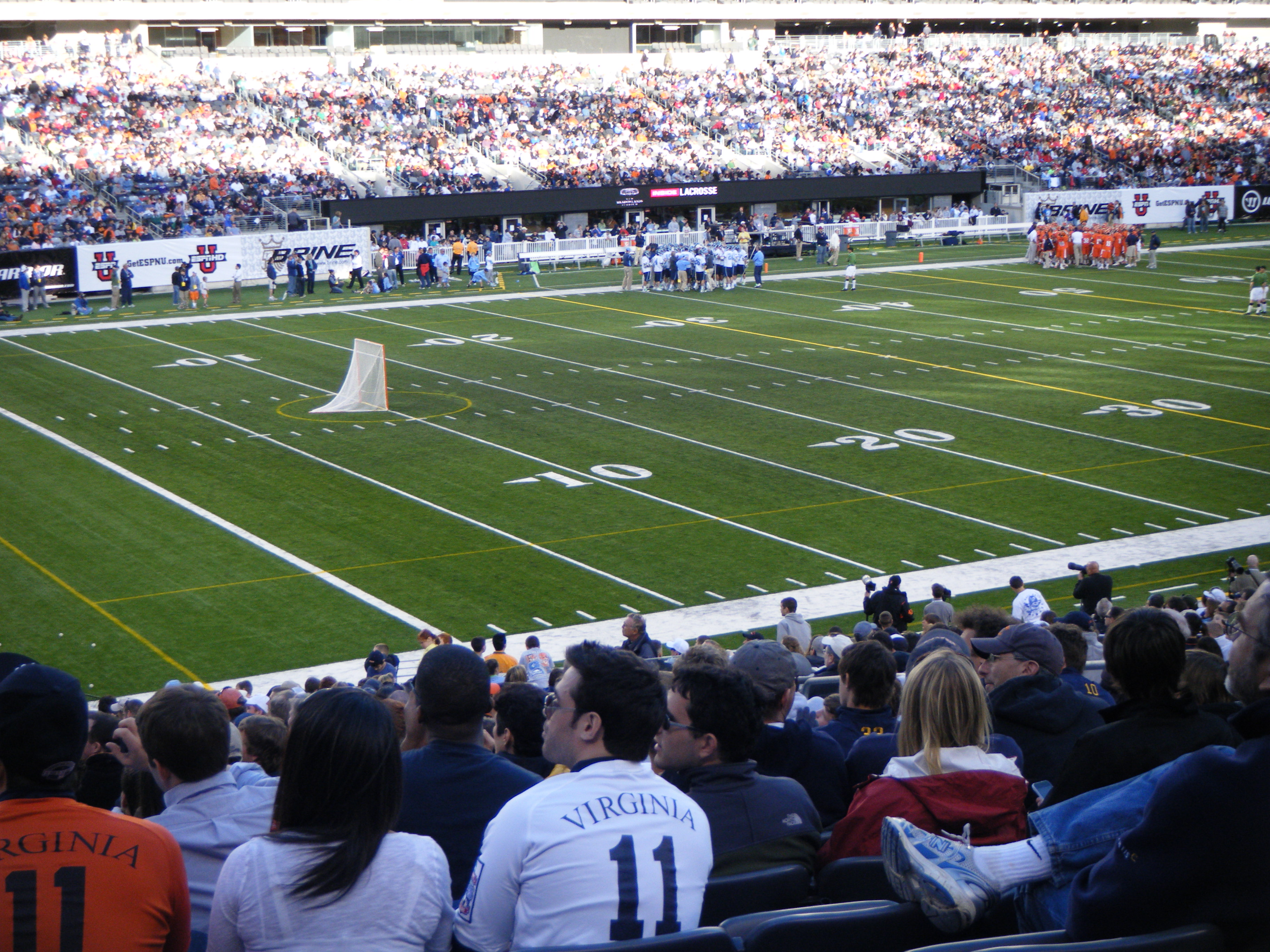
Virginia plays North Carolina in 2010

Date	Winning team		Losing team		Attendance
April 4, 2009	1 Virginia	12	10 North Carolina	11	22,308
April 4, 2009	5 Princeton	12	2 Syracuse	8	22,308
April 4, 2009	7 Hofstra	10	Delaware	8	22,308
April 10, 2010	12 Hofstra	12	Delaware	11	25,710
April 10, 2010	1 Virginia	7	2 North Carolina	5	25,710
April 10, 2010	3 Syracuse	13	4 Princeton	4	25,710
April 3, 2011	St. John's	9	Rutgers	8	25,145
April 3, 2011	3 Johns Hopkins	10	7 North Carolina	9	25,145
April 3, 2011	2 Syracuse	13	8 Duke	11	25,145
April 1, 2012	6 Notre Dame	13	St. John's	6	25,934
April 1, 2012	8 Duke	12	14 Syracuse	10	25,934
April 1, 2012	North Carolina	13	1 Johns Hopkins	9	25,934

== See also ==
- Face-Off Classic, an NCAA men's lacrosse tournament held annually at the beginning of the season at M&T Bank Stadium in Baltimore, Maryland
