= Hartford Lightning =

Basketball team

- Founded: 2011
- Folded: 2012
- League: APBL
- Team history: Hartford Lightning (2011-2012)
- Based in: Hartford, Connecticut
- Colors: Yellow, black, white
- Owner: Dana Wright
- Head coach: Israel Caro
- Championships: 0

The Hartford Lightning was a minor league basketball team of the American Professional Basketball League.

== History ==
Based in the Hartford, Connecticut, The Lightning played just one season (2011–12) before ceasing operations. After a successful 11–3 regular season Hartford were defeated in the league semifinal by the Beltway Bombers.
