= American Professional Basketball League =

American Professional Basketball League (APBL)
- American Professional Basketball League
- Sport: Basketball
- Founded: 2010
- Folded: 2019
- Owner: Brian Graham
- No. of teams: 17
- Country: United States
- Last champion: Beltway Bombers (2019)
- Most titles: Beltway Bombers (3)
- Website: theAPBL.com

The American Professional Basketball League (APBL) was a semi-professional men's basketball league that began play in 2010. Originally known as the Atlantic Coast Professional Basketball League (ACPBL), the league changed its name before the 2012–13 season. The league ceased operations after the 2019 season. Teams were located up and down the Atlantic Coast from New York to Northern Virginia.

== History ==
Formed in 2010 as the ACPBL, the league initially was made up of two teams (Buffalo Stampede, Washington GreenHawks) formerly of the Premier Basketball League, three teams (Beltway Bombers, Garden State Rebels, Tru Hope Trailblazers) formerly of the Eastern Basketball Alliance, and three expansion teams (Hudson Valley Kingz, New York Lions, Westchester Wildkatz).

For the 2016-17 season the APBL narrowed its footprint, with the majority of teams in the New York City metro area. Teams departing included the Bay Area Shuckers, Brooklyn Blazers, D.C. Funkhouse, NoVA Hawks, Rockville Victors and Winchester Storm. New teams joining for 2016–17: APBL United (a league-operated free agent team) and the New York Crusaders. Beltway Bombers captured their second league title in 2017 defeating APBL United 123-105 in the championship game.

== Teams ==
Team	City	Arena	Founded	First season in APBL
APBL United	Travel team	---	2016	2016
Baltimore Lords of War	Dundalk, Maryland	Sollers Point Multi-Purpose Center	2018	2018
Beltway Bombers	La Plata, Maryland	College of Southern Maryland	2009	2010
Delaware Eastern Shore Generals	Milford, Delaware	Milford High School	2017	2017
Empire State Basketball Club	Westchester, New York		2017	2017
Harford Buccaneers	Baltimore, Maryland		2018	2018
Manhattan Pride	Manhattan, New York	Latino Pastoral Action Center	2011	2011
Metropolitan All-Stars	Washington D.C.		2012	2017
New York City Black Eagles	Brooklyn, New York	Williamsburg Community Center	2012	2012
New York City 524	Staten Island, New York	Fastbreak Basketball Center	2011	2011
New York Crusaders	Brooklyn, New York	Dr. Susan S. McKinney Secondary School of the Arts	2015	2016
New York Fearless	New York, New York		2015	2015
Ocean 11 Brooklyn	Brooklyn, New York	Williamsburg Charter High School	2016	2016
Pelham Bay Legends	The Bronx, New York		2018	2018
Philadelphia Stunnaz	Philadelphia, Pennsylvania		2017	2017
TE United	New York City, New York		2018	2018
Westchester Power	Westchester, New York		2018	2018

=== Former teams ===
- Bay Area Shuckers (2011–16)
- Brooklyn All Game (2012–14)
- Brooklyn Blazers (2012–16)
- Brooklyn Firebirds (2012–13)
- Buffalo Stampede (2010–11)
- Buffalo Warriors (2011–12)
- Capital City Express (2012–14)
- D.C. Drew All Stars (2014)
- D.C. Funkhouse Piranhas (2013–16)
- Garden State Rebels (2010–12)
- Gotham City Revolution (2013–14)
- Hartford Lightning (2011–12)
- Hudson Valley Hype (2014)
- Hudson Valley Kingz (2010–16)
- Long Island United (2014)
- Metropolitan All-Stars (2012–14)
- New Jersey Thunder (2013–16)
- New York Lions (2010–11)
- North Jersey Pros (2011–12)
- NoVA Hawks (2012–16)
- Philadelphia Destroyers (2011–14)
- Rockville Victors (2012–17)
- Toms River Shooters (2011–12)
- Tri-City Suns (2011)
- Tru Hope Trailblazers (2010–11)
- Washington GreenHawks (2010) - team dissolved and replaced by Tri-City Suns in January 2011
- Westchester Wildkatz (2010–11)
- Winchester Storm (2012–16)

== Champions ==
Year	Champion	Runner-up	Result
2011	Tru Hope Trailblazers	Garden State Rebels	97-96
2012	Beltway Bombers	The Destroyers	127-118
2013	NYC 524	Rockville Victors	118-116
2014	Metropolitan All-Stars	NYC 524	95-74
2015	New Jersey Thunder	Rockville Victors	99-98
2016	New Jersey Thunder	Hudson Valley Kingz	100-99
2017	Beltway Bombers	APBL United	123-105
2018	Delaware Eastern Shore Generals	APBL United	128-127
2019	Beltway Bombers	New Jersey Thunder	126-105 (OT)

== Notable players ==
Lonny Baxter, Rockville Victors

Adrian Bowie, Bay Area Shuckers

William "Smush" Parker, NYC 524

Chaz Williams, Brooklyn Blazers
