= Central Basketball Association =

Semi-professional men's basketball league

Central Basketball Association (CBA)
- Sport: Basketball
- Founded: 2013
- First season: 2013
- Folded: 2019
- No. of teams: 7
- Country: United States
- Continent: FIBA Americas (Americas)
- Last champion: Indianapolis Blaze (2019)
- Most titles: Fort Wayne Flite (3)
- Website: www.playCBA.com

The Central Basketball Association (CBA) was a semi-professional men's basketball league that began play in the spring of 2013. The league schedule typically began in March and ended in May.

== History ==
The four charter members are Bowling Green Hornets, Middle Tennessee Storm, River City Panthers, St. Louis Hawks (all formerly of the Central Basketball League).

Three teams (Chattanooga Rail Runners, Fort Wayne Flite and Memphis Soul Kings) were added for the 2014 season. After the second CBA season St. Louis Hawks ceased operations. An original member of the league, St. Louis went 10-7 over two regular seasons, capturing the first-ever CBA championship.

For 2015, CBA added three expansion teams: Indianapolis Briks, Mississippi Eagles and Springfield Sentinels.

After the 2015 season Memphis Soul Kings ceased operations. Chattanooga Rail Runners relocated to Memphis. Expansion teams Columbus Condors and Indianapolis Blaze were added for the 2016 season.

== Teams ==
Team	City	Arena	Founded	First season in CBA
Baltimore Shuckers	Baltimore, Maryland	Anne Arundel Community College	2011	2017
Bowling Green Hornets	Russellville, Kentucky	Logan County High School	2013	2013
Fort Wayne Flite	Fort Wayne, Indiana	Horizon Christian Academy	2014	2014
Indianapolis Blaze	Indianapolis, Indiana	Shortridge High School	2015	2016
Jackson Eagles	Jackson, Tennessee	Lane College	2014	2015
Memphis Rail Runners	Memphis, Tennessee	JIFF Center	2014	2014
Middle Tennessee Storm	Nashville, Tennessee	Fisk University	2014	2014

Rail Runners The first head coach was Rodney English (2014-2015), with the current head coach being Paul Gaffney (2015–present). Gaffney is a 17-year veteran of the Harlem Globetrotters. He founded the Rail Runners as a way to provide local players yet one more opportunity to realize their professional dreams.

=== Former teams ===
- Columbus Condors (2016)
- Illinois Coal Miners (2017)
- Indianapolis Briks (2015)
- Memphis Soul Kings (2014)
- Peoria Panthers (2013)
- Springfield Sentinels (2015)
- St. Louis Hawks (2013)
- Washington Stars (2017)

== Champions ==
Season	Champion	Runner-up	Result
2013	St. Louis Hawks	Bowling Green Hornets	107-96
2014	Middle Tennessee Storm	St. Louis Hawks (CBA)	106-103
2015	Bowling Green Hornets	Fort Wayne Flite	97-95
2016	Fort Wayne Flite	Middle Tennessee Storm	110-83
2017	Fort Wayne Flite	Indianapolis Blaze	95-92
2018	Fort Wayne Flite	Indianapolis Blaze	98-95 2OT
2019	Indianapolis Blaze	Fort Wayne Flite	83-82
