= The First 4 =

Annual college lacrosse event held in California

The First 4 men's lacrosse invitational was an annual college lacrosse event held in California with the feature event being a double-header involving four NCAA Division I men's lacrosse teams. The event is representative of the recent expansion of the sport far afield from its traditional strongholds of Maryland and New York. The inaugural event took place at the Home Depot Center in Carson, California on March 12, 2005. It drew a crowd of 7,182 spectators. An event was planned for 2009, but cancelled due to a scheduling conflict and never resumed.

== Results ==
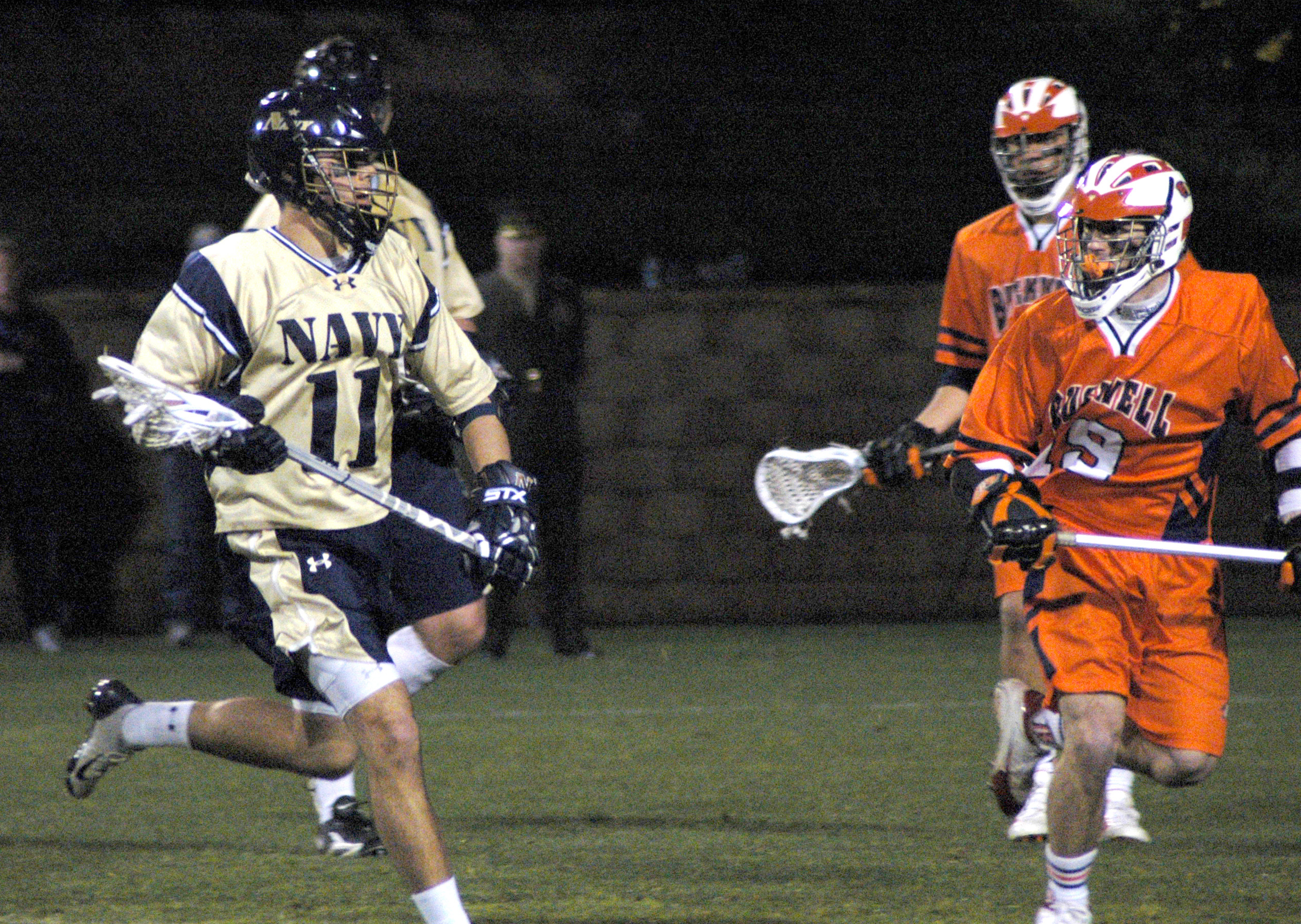
Navy plays Bucknell during the 2006 First 4

Year	Winning team		Losing team		Location	Venue
2005	Notre Dame	9	North Carolina	7	Carson, California	Home Depot Center
2005	Georgetown	10	Syracuse	7	Carson, California	Home Depot Center
2006	Duke	9	Loyola	7	San Diego, California	Torero Stadium
2006	Navy	9	Bucknell	5	San Diego, California	Torero Stadium
2007	Yale	12	Air Force	9	San Diego, California	Torero Stadium
2007	Loyola	8	Duke	7	San Diego, California	Torero Stadium
2008	Event not held					
2009	Event cancelled					
