= Loyola–Towson lacrosse rivalry =

College sports rivalry

- Loyola Greyhounds Towson Tigers
- First meeting: 1959; Loyola 8, Towson 6
- Latest meeting: March 3, 2026; Loyola 17, Towson 13

Statistics
- Total meetings: 69
- All-time series: Loyola leads, 37–32
- Largest victory: Towson, 26–6 (1974)
- Longest win streak: Towson, 11 (1969–1979)
- Current win streak: Loyola, 1 (2026–present)

The Loyola–Towson lacrosse rivalry is an intercollegiate lacrosse rivalry between Baltimore's Loyola Greyhounds of the Patriot League and Towson Tigers of the Colonial Athletic Association. The teams first met in 1959 and competed at the NCAA Division II level until transferring up to Division I in 1980 for Towson and in 1982 for Loyola. The two programs share locations on Charles Street and are separated by only four and a half miles. They also share cross-street rivalries with foe Johns Hopkins (see Johns Hopkins–Loyola lacrosse rivalry). Successful in Division II, both the Greyhounds and Tigers have had success at the national level in the first division since moving up. Loyola has appeared in four Final Fours and won the 2012 national title, while Towson has appeared in three final fours of their own, in addition to their 1974 Division II championship. Through 2025, Loyola leads the series by a 36–32 margin, the most-played opponent for both schools.

== Series History ==
=== Division II Years (1959 to 1981) ===
The series began in 1959, ending in a two-goal victory for the Greyhounds. Since that date, the rivalry has been played annually, with the lone exception being 1980. Loyola took seven of the first ten meetings, but the Tigers would dominate the 1970s, taking 11 straight matchups. This included a 20-goal thumping of the Hounds in 1974, the widest margin in the history of the rivalry. In '74, Towson would prevail in the 1974 NCAA Division I Men's Lacrosse Championship to claim its first national title, defeating the Hobart Statesmen 18–17 in double overtime. The Tigers would continue to make the tournament on a regular basis on legendary coach Carl Runk, while Loyola struggled to compete with Towson. In 1980, the Tigers would move up to Division I, accounting for the only interruption in the series to date. The following season, Loyola would down Towson 13–9 to end the losing streak and would finish the season as the national runner-up in Division II.

=== National Implications (1980s through 2000s) ===
The very next year, Loyola moved up to Division I in 1982, joining the Tigers. The first contest at this level went the way of Towson and the following games would gain increasing significance. 1983 was the first between two ranked programs and would go the way of the Tigers. Both teams would make their first appearances in the Division I tournament towards the end of the decade. The 1989 affair was particularly notable as the first between two Top 10 teams, as #3 Loyola topped #8 Towson by five. The next five meetings would also be between Top 10 teams, highlighted by Towson's upset of #1 Loyola in 1992, a home overtime victory. On the national stage, the two teams enjoyed renewed success. Dave Cottle's 1990 Greyhounds finished as national runner-up and the following season would result in Runk's squad losing to North Carolina in the championship. A few years later, Towson would upset Loyola 16–11 in the 1996 tournament in their first postseason meeting.

After long stretches of continued success, both programs struggled at points just before and after the turn of the century. With Cottle's departure before the 2002 season, the Hounds missed their first tournament in fifteen years. The Tigers would endure a four-year tournament drought of their own between 1996 and 2001 before new coach Tony Seamen would lead Towson to another Final Four. In 2006, new head coach Charley Toomey took over for Loyola and would return to the tournament the following year, but neither team was viewed as a serious contender at the national stage.

=== Recent Years (2010s to Present) ===
The rivalry's importance was renewed in the 2010s, particularly after the Hound's magical season in 2012, in which they defeated Towson 13–6 and won their first-ever national championship. New Tigers coach Shawn Nadelen quickly built a worthy competitor to Loyola, though the Greyhounds would get the best of their rival in the 2016 tournament to reach another Final Four. Towson would reach the semifinals the next year and, in 2019, would knock off another top-ranked Loyola, sending the Tigers to their first appearance at the top of the national polls in program history. Since 2008, Loyola has won 14 of 16 meetings, coinciding with their high-level success at the top of the collegiate sport. The rivalry records of the current head coaches, Toomey and Nadelen, stand at 12–4 and 2–8 respectively. This includes a dominant performance by the Hounds over winless Towson in 2020, with the nine goal margin representing the largest in the series in six years.

== Rival Accomplishments ==
The following summarizes the accomplishments of the two programs.

Team	Loyola Greyhounds	Towson Tigers
Pre-NCAA National Titles	0	0
NCAA National Titles	1	1^
NCAA Final Four Appearances	5*	6^
NCAA Tournament Appearances	26*	21^
NCAA Tournament Record	17–25*	18–20^
Conference Tournament Titles	6	9
Conference Championships	10	14
Tewaarton Award Recipients	1	0
Lt. Raymond Enners Award Recipients	1	0
Consensus First Team All-Americans	17	4
All-time Program Record	537–408–7	472–344
All-time Winning Percentage	.568	.578

- Loyola's 1979 and 1981 NCAA tournament appearances came at the Division II level.
- ^Towson's 1974 NCAA tournament championship and all six tournament appearances from 1974 to 1979 came at the Division II level.

== Game Results ==
Loyola victories	Towson victories	Tie games

No.	Date	Location	Winner	Score
1	1959	Towson, MD	Loyola	8–6
2	1960	Towson, MD	Loyola	10–7
3	1961	Towson, MD	Towson	15–9
4	1962	Baltimore, MD	Loyola	13–6
5	1963	Towson, MD	Loyola	10–9
6	1964	Towson, MD	Loyola	8–1
7	1965	Baltimore, MD	Towson	7–6
8	1966	Towson, MD	Towson	5–4
9	1967	Baltimore, MD	Loyola	12–6
10	1968	Towson, MD	Loyola	5–4
11	1969	Baltimore, MD	Towson	11–10
12	1970	Towson, MD	Towson	17–2
13	1971	Baltimore, MD	Towson	13–4
14	1972	Towson, MD	Towson	17–3
15	1973	Baltimore, MD	#12 Towson	14–2
16	1974	Towson, MD	Towson	26–6
17	1975	Baltimore, MD	Towson	18–7
18	1976	Towson, MD	Towson	20–6
19	1977	Baltimore, MD	Towson	15–12
20	1978	Towson, MD	Towson	20–12
21	1979	Baltimore, MD	Towson	13–12
22	1981	Baltimore, MD	Loyola	13–9
23	1982	Towson, MD	Towson	22–14
24	1983	Baltimore, MD	#12 Towson	12–9

No.	Date	Location	Winner	Score
25	1984	Towson, MD	#13 Towson	11–7
26	1985	Baltimore, MD	Loyola	7–5
27	1986	Towson, MD	Towson	9–8
28	1987	Baltimore, MD	#14 Towson	8–7
29	1988	Towson, MD	#7 Loyola	10–9
30	1989	Baltimore, MD	#3 Loyola	9–4
31	1990	Towson, MD	#4 Loyola	17–12
32	1991	Baltimore, MD	#6 Loyola	14–12
33	1992	Towson, MD	#6 Towson	8–7^{OT}
34	1993	Baltimore, MD	#8 Loyola	12–8
35	1994	Towson, MD	#2 Loyola	13–12
36	1995	Baltimore, MD	#3 Loyola	16–8
37	1996	Towson, MD	#17 Towson	12–11^{OT}
38	1996	Annapolis, MD	#14 Towson	16–11
39	1997	Baltimore, MD	#8 Loyola	20–9
40	1998	Towson, MD	#7 Loyola	12–8
41	1999	Baltimore, MD	#1 Loyola	16–14
42	2000	Towson, MD	#3 Loyola	13–8
43	2001	Baltimore, MD	#18 Towson	19–14
44	2002	Towson, MD	#4 Loyola	15–7
45	2003	Baltimore, MD	#18 Towson	15–10
46	2004	Towson, MD	Loyola	14–9
47	2005	Baltimore, MD	Towson	7–5
48	2006	Towson, MD	Towson	11–10

No.	Date	Location	Winner	Score
49	2007	Baltimore, MD	#14 Towson	9–8
50	2008	Towson, MD	Loyola	13–8
51	2009	Baltimore, MD	#16 Loyola	11–8
52	2010	Baltimore, MD	#14 Loyola	7–6
53	2011	Towson, MD	#15 Loyola	3–2
54	2012	Baltimore, MD	#13 Loyola	13–6
55	2013	Towson, MD	#2 Loyola	14–9
56	2014	Baltimore, MD	#9 Loyola	20–4
57	2015	Towson, MD	#8 Loyola	15–11
58	2016	Baltimore, MD	#11 Towson	10–8
59	2016	Columbus, OH	#7 Loyola	10–8
60	2017	Towson, MD	#12 Loyola	11–7
61	2018	Baltimore, MD	#9 Loyola	12–8
62	2019	Towson, MD	#7 Towson	12–10
63	2020	Baltimore, MD	#12 Loyola	15–6
64	2021	Towson, MD	Towson	7–6^{OT}
65	2022	Baltimore, MD	Towson	11–8
66	2023	Towson, MD	#7 Loyola	12–11^{OT}
67	2024	Baltimore, MD	Loyola	11–10^{OT}
68	2025	Towson, MD	Towson	13–12^{2OT}
69	2026	Baltimore, MD	Loyola	17–13
Series: Loyola leads 37–32
