= Loyola Greyhounds =

Athletic program of Loyola University Maryland

- University: Loyola University Maryland
- NCAA: Division I
- Conference: Patriot League
- Athletic director: Donna Woodruff
- Location: Baltimore, Maryland
- Varsity teams: 17
- Basketball arena: Reitz Arena
- Soccer stadium: Ridley Athletic Complex
- Volleyball arena: Reitz Arena
- Nickname: Greyhounds
- Colors: Green and gray
- Mascot: Iggy
- Website: loyolagreyhounds.com
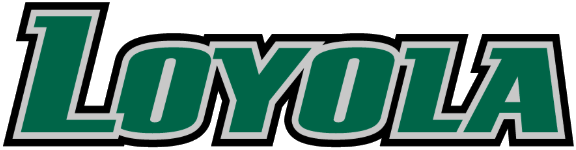

The Loyola Greyhounds (also called the Loyola Maryland Greyhounds) are the athletic teams that represent Loyola University Maryland. The teams include men and women's basketball, cross country, lacrosse, rowing, soccer, swimming & diving, and tennis. Men's sports also include golf, while women's sports also include track and field and volleyball. The Greyhounds compete in NCAA Division I and have been a member of the Patriot League for all sports since July 1, 2013.

Loyola's fight song, "Howl for the Hounds," was written by Andrew R. Grillo and Michael R. Sellitto and unveiled in November 2003.

== History ==
=== Conference affiliations ===
Loyola's athletic programs made the transition to NCAA Division I from Division II when it became a charter member of the ECAC-Metro Conference in 1981. The circuit's name was changed to the Northeast Conference on August 1, 1988.

Loyola was a full member of the Metro Atlantic Athletic Conference (MAAC) in all but two sports from July 1, 1989 to June 30, 2013. The exceptions were the men's and women's lacrosse teams which were in the ECAC Lacrosse League and the Big East Conference respectively. The move to the Patriot League as its tenth member was announced on August 29, 2012 and became official on July 1, 2013.

=== Athletic directors ===
Name	Years	Highlights	Notes
Lefty Reitz	1938–1973	Reitz Arena named in his honor	
Tom O'Connor	June 1974–June 1986	Move to NCAA Division I	
Tom Brennan	July 1986–October 1990		
Joe Boylan	February 1991–June 2010	Ridley Athletic Complex opens	
Jim Paquette	July 2010–June 2017	Move to Patriot League	
Donna Woodruff	July 2017–		

== Teams ==
Men's sports	Women's sports
Basketball	Basketball
Cross Country	Cross Country
Golf	Lacrosse
Lacrosse	Rowing
Rowing	Soccer
Soccer	Swimming & Diving
Swimming & Diving	Tennis
Tennis	Track and Field
	Volleyball

=== Basketball ===
The Loyola men's basketball team has a long history and has been playing since the 1908-1909 season. In all that time, the team has appeared twice, 1994 and 2012, in the NCAA tournament. The team plays its games in Reitz Arena and is coached by Tavaras Hardy.

Skip Prosser spent one season as head coach of the Greyhounds, leading them to their first-ever Division I Tournament appearance in 1994. In 2012, as winners of the MAAC tournament, Loyola earned its second trip to the NCAA tournament under then-head coach Jimmy Patsos.

=== Lacrosse ===
The Loyola men's lacrosse team has played since 1938, with a two-year break in 1944 and 1945, winning over 400 games in that time. They won its first championship in the sport, the first national title in the university's Division I history, in 2012. The Loyola women's lacrosse program is fifth all-time among NCAA Division I women's lacrosse teams with 362 wins. The Greyhounds maintain several annual rivalries, headlined by Johns Hopkins (series page) and Towson (series page).

=== Men's soccer ===
The Loyola Men's Soccer team has consistently proven to be one of the most successful teams in the athletic department. Since 1965, the team has suffered only four losing seasons. The team is a perennial power in the MAAC and has reached the NCAA Division I National Tournament seven times since joining Division I in 1979, including quarterfinal appearances in 1986 and 1987 and a Sweet 16 appearance in 2001. Loyola enjoyed an undefeated regular season in 2008 before being upset in the second round of the NCAA Tournament. Former Greyhounds include the 2009 Major League Soccer Goalkeeper of the Year, Zach Thornton as well as many others who have played in the MLS and other professional leagues.

=== Golf ===
The men's golf team has won 22 conference titles:

- Northeast Conference (4): 1986–89
- Metro Atlantic Athletic Conference (15): 1990, 1992–93, 1995–96, 1998, 2003–05, 2008–13
- Patriot League (2): 2014–15, 2017

Note: 1992 co-champions with Siena

2 GCAA Academic All-Americans: Patrick McCormick and Ryan McCarthy

=== Rugby ===
Spring 2007 season play

The Loyola University Rugby Football Club is the men's rugby union team that represents Loyola in the National Small College Rugby Organization. The club is composed of over 50 student-athletes, alumni volunteers, and professional trainers. Founded in 1976 by a group of Loyola students, LURFC continues to be the oldest and most active club sport at the college. LURFC and its players have achieved many All-American titles and U.S. Rugby rankings, currently ranked #20 in the country and in the NSCRO "Sweet 16" in 2017.

The Greyhound ruggers have also traveled abroad to play Irish teams, including teams in Limerick, Dublin, and Cork. Loyola plays on Lugano Field, located on the grounds of the Ridley Athletic Center. Lugano Field is a state of the art turf pitch that, while used by the university as a whole, is a "rugby first" pitch, regulation size, lined and with limited grandstands. It is named in honor of the most decorated player in Loyola history, Sean Lugano, who died serving others in the World Trade Center attacks of September 11, 2001.

== Media ==
Loyola launched in the autumn of 2011 Hounds Unleashed, a free streaming media service for its live events. As a result of the university's transition to a new athletic conference, it was incorporated into the Patriot League Network (PLN) upon the latter's creation on 29 July 2013. The network was absorbed into ESPN+ on 16 September 2020.

== Former teams ==
=== Football ===
Loyola's football program has been defunct since 1933.

=== Wrestling ===
Loyola's wrestling program was discontinued in 1987.
