= Dave Cottle =

American lacrosse coach

Biographical details
- Born: Baltimore, Maryland, U.S.

Playing career
- 1975–1978: Salisbury

Coaching career (HC unless noted)
- 1979: Salisbury (GA)
- 1980–1982: Severn School
- 1983–2001: Loyola
- 2002–2010: Maryland
- 2011, 2016-2017: Chesapeake Bayhawks (cons.)
- 2012-2015, 2018: Chesapeake Bayhawks

Head coaching record
- Overall: 280–115

Accomplishments and honors

Championships
- 2005 ACC championship 2004 ACC championship

Awards
- 2008 ACC Coach of the Year; 1988 USILA Coach of the Year; 3 × All-American (as player)

Dave Cottle is a retired American lacrosse coach. He was a consultant for Marquette University, when they added men's and women's varsity lacrosse on December 16, 2010. He was previously the head coach for the Maryland Terrapins men's lacrosse team at the University of Maryland from 2002 to 2010. Cottle also coached the Loyola College men's lacrosse team from 1983 to 2001.

== College career ==
Cottle attended Northern High School in his hometown of Baltimore, Maryland. He later enrolled at Salisbury State University in Salisbury, Maryland, where he played lacrosse from 1975 to 1978. During his playing career, he set numerous school and NCAA records. In his freshman season, 1975, Cottle led the nation in scoring, and became the second player in history to surpass 100 points in a season. He was named an All-American three years.

== Coaching career ==
=== Loyola College ===
Cottle began his coaching career as a graduate assistant at Salisbury and then spent three years as the head coach at the Severn School, where he compiled a 26–9 record. In 1983, he took over as head coach at Loyola. In 1988, he led the Greyhounds to the NCAA tournament, and repeated the feat each subsequent season of his career at Loyola for a total of 14 appearances. Each of those years, the Greyhounds finished the season ranked in the top ten. In 1989, Cottle guided his team to become the only one in school history to finish the regular season undefeated. In 1990, Loyola advanced through the NCAA tournament to the final, before losing to Syracuse. The Greyhounds finished the 1994 season with an 11–2 record, one of their best in history, and recorded their first ever win over cross-town rival Johns Hopkins, 17–15. In 1999, Loyola under Cottle became the first team with a top seeding to not advance to the NCAA semifinals (Final Four).

=== Maryland ===
Cottle was hired as the head coach for the University of Maryland men's lacrosse team in September 2001. In his first season, 2002, the Terps finished 9–4 and did not qualify for the NCAA tournament. Beginning in 2003, Maryland made an appearance each subsequent season of Cottle's tenure. In 2003, the Terrapins appeared in the national tournament semifinals for the first time since 1998 and finished ranked number-three in the nation. The following season, Maryland won the Atlantic Coast Conference (ACC) championship for the first time since 1998. In 2005, Cottle led the Terps to a second consecutive ACC title. Maryland again made Final Four appearances in 2006 and 2007. In 2008, Maryland had an attacking corps composed entirely of freshman, but advanced to the NCAA quarterfinals before being eliminated by Virginia in an overtime game.

In 2010, Maryland earned the number-three seed in the NCAA tournament, and were strong favorites to reach the semifinals after number-two seed Syracuse was upset by Army in the first round. The Terrapins, however, were upset by Notre Dame in the second round. The following day, Cottle announced his resignation. Maryland athletic director Deborah Yow had earlier told Cottle that he was expected to reach the semifinals for a contract extension to be considered.

The Terrapins finished each of his nine seasons with a winning percentage of no less than 0.625. The team also has advanced to the NCAA tournament eight out of nine years. Cottle received criticism, however, due to his inability to lead his team to the NCAA finals. At the time, the Terrapins had not secured a national title since 1975, despite being the largest school in the state of Maryland, a traditional bastion of lacrosse talent. In 2001, some Maryland supporters had been critical of the athletic department's selection of Cottle over interim head coach Dave Slafkosky or former Syracuse star Gary Gait, who was an assistant for the Maryland women's team at the time.

=== Chesapeake Bayhawks ===
In July 2010, the Chesapeake Bayhawks of Major League Lacrosse hired Cottle as a consultant.

=== Marquette University ===
In December 2010, Marquette University in the Big East conference hired Cottle as a consultant.

== Personal life ==
Cottle currently resides in Edgewater, Maryland Cottle is father to three daughters and a son.

== Head coaching record ==
Record table
Season	Team	Overall	Conference	Standing	Postseason
Loyola Greyhounds (NCAA independent) (1983–2001)
1983	Loyola	5–9			
1984	Loyola	10–4			
1985	Loyola	8–5			
1986	Loyola	7–4			
1987	Loyola	8–3			
1988	Loyola	12–2			NCAA Division I quarterfinals
1989	Loyola	10–1			NCAA Division I quarterfinals
1990	Loyola	11–3			NCAA Division I runner-up
1991	Loyola	9–4			NCAA Division I quarterfinals
1992	Loyola	8–4			NCAA Division I first round
1993	Loyola	8–5			NCAA Division I quarterfinals
1994	Loyola	11–2			NCAA Division I quarterfinals
1995	Loyola	11–4			NCAA Division I quarterfinals
1996	Loyola	7–6			NCAA Division I first round
1997	Loyola	10–4			NCAA Division I quarterfinals
1998	Loyola	13–2			NCAA Division I semifinals
1999	Loyola	12–1			NCAA Division I quarterfinals
2000	Loyola	11–3			NCAA Division I first round
2001	Loyola	10–4			NCAA Division I quarterfinals
Loyola:		181–70 (.721)			
Maryland Terrapins (Atlantic Coast Conference) (2002–2010)
2002	Maryland	9–4	1–2	T–2nd	
2003	Maryland	12–4	2–1	T–1st	NCAA Division I semifinals
2004	Maryland	13–3	3–0	1st	NCAA Division I quarterfinals
2005	Maryland	11–6	1–2	3rd	NCAA Division I semifinals
2006	Maryland	12–5	2–1	2nd	NCAA Division I semifinals
2007	Maryland	10–6	1–2	3rd	NCAA Division I first round
2008	Maryland	10–6	2–1	2nd	NCAA Division I quarterfinals
2009	Maryland	10–7	2–1	T–1st	NCAA Division I quarterfinals
2010	Maryland	12–4	1–2	T–3rd	NCAA Division I quarterfinals
Maryland:		99–45 (.688)	15–12 (.556)		
Total:		280–115 (.709)			
National champion Postseason invitational champion Conference regular season champion Conference regular season and conference tournament champion Division regular season champion Division regular season and conference tournament champion Conference tournament champion
