= Paul Cantabene =

American lacrosse player

Personal information
- Nickname: Beaner
- Born: March 26, 1970 (age 56) Rochester, New York, U.S.
- Height: 5 ft 11 in (180 cm)
- Weight: 200 lb (91 kg; 14 st 4 lb)

Sport
- Position: Midfielder/Face-Off
- NCAA team: Loyola (1993)
- NLL teams: Baltimore Thunder; Pittsburgh Crossefire; Washington Power; Philadelphia Wings
- MLL teams: Baltimore Bayhawks; Philadelphia Barrage
- Pro career: 1994–2006

Paul Cantabene (born March 26, 1970) is an American retired professional lacrosse player and face-off specialist. He is the namesake for the Premier Lacrosse League's Paul Cantabene Faceoff Athlete of the Year Award, being described as one of the most intense and hardest working players and having revolutionized the faceoff position.

== Playing career ==
Cantabene attended Irondequoit High School then Loyola College in Maryland, where he was an All-American lacrosse player.

=== Professional career ===
In 1994, he made his professional lacrosse debut in the Major Indoor Lacrosse League with the Baltimore Thunder. He followed the franchise on its relocation to Pittsburgh and back to Washington. He then played out the rest of his indoor lacrosse career, until 2004, with the Philadelphia Wings.

Cantabene joined the Baltimore Bayhawks in the inaugural season of the Major League Lacrosse. He remained with the team though 2005, helping the Bayhawks capture the Steinfeld Cup in both 2002 and 2005. In 2002, he was given the Major League Lacrosse Iron Lizard of the Year Award the player who "most embodied the traits of toughness, tenacity and determination regardless of pain or injury during season." In 2006, he was traded to the Philadelphia Barrage where he captured his third Steinfeld Cup victory. He retired from the Major League Lacrosse after the season.

=== Professional Lacrosse Hall of Fame ===
On June 18, 2022, Cantabene was inducted into the Professional Lacrosse Hall of Fame as one of the eleven members of the inaugural class of inductees.

== Statistics ==
=== NLL ===
		Regular season						Playoffs
Season	Team	GP	G	A	Pts	LB	PIM	GP	G	A	Pts	LB	PIM
1994	Baltimore	8	7	3	10	31	4	-	-	-	-	-	-
1995	Baltimore	8	1	11	12	24	8	-	-	-	-	-	-
1996	Baltimore	8	9	9	18	19	8	-	-	-	-	-	-
1997	Baltimore	9	12	11	23	59	29	-	-	-	-	-	-
1998	Baltimore	11	6	20	26	77	10	3	5	6	11	20	2
1999	Baltimore	12	17	24	41	115	34	1	0	2	2	9	4
2000	Pittsburgh	11	9	17	26	102	16	-	-	-	-	-	-
2001	Washington	13	9	20	29	93	38	1	0	1	1	13	2
2002	Washington	16	18	42	60	163	24	2	1	4	5	15	4
2003	Philadelphia	12	16	23	39	111	23	-	-	-	-	-	-
2004	Philadelphia	6	3	4	7	65	25	-	-	-	-	-	-
NLL totals		114	107	184	291	859	219	7	6	13	19	57	12

=== MLL ===
Season	Team	Regular season											Playoffs										
Season	Team	GP	G	2PG	A	Pts	Sh	GB	Pen	PIM	FOW	FOA	GP	G	2PG	A	Pts	Sh	GB	Pen	PIM	FOW	FOA
2001	Baltimore Bayhawks	14	15	0	6	21	51	82	0	5	161	312	2	3	0	0	3	16	19	0	0	12	29
2002	Baltimore Bayhawks	14	9	0	6	15	49	86	0	5.5	193	385	2	4	0	1	5	6	8	0	1	34	56
2003	Baltimore Bayhawks	11	6	0	6	12	26	92	0	8	158	313	2	1	0	0	1	6	23	0	2	35	59
2004	Baltimore Bayhawks	11	7	0	4	11	29	254	0	11.5	234	376	1	0	0	1	1	2	9	0	1.5	20	39
2005	Baltimore Bayhawks	12	11	1	4	16	28	94	0	8.5	208	356	2	1	0	0	1	3	0	0	0	0	0
2006	Philadelphia Barrage	4	4	0	0	4	10	28	0	1	57	119	2	2	0	0	2	3	10	0	2	42	63
		66	52	1	26	79	193	636	0	39.5	1,011	1,861	11	11	0	2	13	33	69	0	6.5	143	246
Career total:		77	63	1	28	92	226	705	0	46	1,154	2,107											

GP–Games played; G–Goals; 2PG–2-point goals; A–Assists; Pts–Points; Sh–Shots; GB–Ground balls; Pen–Penalties; PIM–Penalty minutes; FOW–Faceoffs won; FOA–Faceoffs attempted

== Coaching ==
A long-time assistant coach at the Division I level, Cantabene spent nine combined seasons at Maryland, Towson and Johns Hopkins before settling down at Stevenson University. Currently, Cantabene is an Associate Athletic Director and Head Lacrosse Coach at Stevenson University, formerly Villa Julie College.

=== High school ===
Cantabene began his coaching career in Owings Mills at The McDonogh School where he spent two seasons as the offensive coordinator in 1994 and 1995, highlighted by a victory over Gilman, the No. 1-ranked team in the MIAA in 1995.

=== Johns Hopkins University ===
Cantabene served as the midfield coach at Johns Hopkins where he helped the Blue Jays to a 41–15 record and three consecutive berths in the NCAA Division I Men's Lacrosse Championship, including a semifinal appearance in 1998. He worked with six All-Americans in three seasons, including three-time honorees A.J. Haugen and Brian Carcaterra.

=== Towson University ===
Cantabene was part of the Tigers' revival, which saw them reach the 2001 NCAA semifinals before losing to eventual national champion Princeton. Towson finished with a 14–4 record and the highest scoring offense in the nation. While at Towson, Cantabene coached five All-Americans, including Spencer Ford who was a 1999 honorable mention selection after leading the nation in assists per game and ranking second in points per game. Kevin Sturm also led the nation in goals per game.

=== University of Maryland ===
During his two seasons at College Park in 2003 and 2004, he served as an assistant under Dave Cottle for whom he played for at Loyola. In 2003, Cantabene helped the Terps' offense to one of their most successful seasons en route to a 12–4 record and an appearance in the NCAA semifinals. Maryland ranked ninth in Division I in scoring offense and three of Cantabene's players, Mike Mollot, Ryan Moran and Joe Walters were named All-Americans. Walters was also the 2003 ACC Rookie of the Year.

=== FIL World U.S. men's lacrosse team ===
In 2010, Catabene was one of four assistant coaches for the U.S. men's lacrosse team that captured the 2010 world title with a 12–10 victory over rival Canada in the FIL World Championship gold medal game.

=== Stevenson University ===
Cantabene is Stevenson's winningest coach in both wins and percentage, picking up his 100th career win on March 3, 2012, becoming the second-fastest in Division III to reach the career mark. In their last nine seasons, the Mustangs have appeared in eight conference championship games, winning twice 2010 & 2013, made five appearances in the NCAA Division III Men's Lacrosse Playoffs, including four semifinals appearances and one championship game!

Over those six seasons, Stevenson has had a 60–9 home record, as well as 20 All-CAC and 32 All-America selections. In 2011 and 2012 the team boasted a program record nine All-Americans. Stevenson has also ranked in the top 20 nationally the last seven consecutive seasons, finishing at No. 1 in 2009 and 2010.

In 2009, Cantabene was named College Coach of the Year by the Maryland State Lacrosse Coaches Association after leading the Mustangs to a 17–2 record, its first-ever NCAA appearance and a No. 1 ranking in the final USILA Division III poll. They also won a school-record 14 consecutive games and went 7–2 against teams in the top 20 with wins over Gettysburg, Lynchburg, Salisbury, Denison and Cabrini.

Year Overall Pct. Conference Pct. Finish Notes 2005 9-6 .600 4-2 .667 2nd 2006 10-8 .556 6-1 .857 2nd ECAC Metro/South champions 2007 11-5 .688 7-1 .875 2nd 2008 13-4 .765 6-1 .857 2nd 2009 17-2 .895 7-0 1.000 1st NCAA semifinals 2010 19-2 .905 6-1 .857 2nd CAC champions; NCAA semifinals 2011 18-3 .857 8-0 1.000 1st NCAA quarterfinals 2012 18-5 .783 7-1 .875 2nd NCAA semifinals 2013 22-2 .913 8-0 1.000 1st CC champions; NCAA champions 2014 19-3 .900 8-0 1.000 1st CC champions; NCAA quarterfinals 2015 16-5 .762 8-0 1.000 1st CC champions; NCAA second round 2016 15-5 .750 8.0 1.000 1st CC champions; NCAA first round 2017 14-6 .700 8-0 1.000 1st CC champions, NCAA third round 2018 12-7 .640 8-0 1.000 1st CC champions: NCAA second round 2019 13-8 .650 8-0 1.000 1st CC champions: NCAA third round Totals 226-69 .766 107-7 .938 11 NCAA Tournaments 9 CC champions
