= North Carolina Tar Heels men's lacrosse =

Men's Lacrosse Team for North Carolina

- Founded: 1949 (varsity), 1937 (club)
- University: University of North Carolina at Chapel Hill
- Head coach: Joe Breschi (since 2009 season)
- Stadium: Dorrance Field (capacity: 4,200)
- Location: Chapel Hill, North Carolina
- Conference: Atlantic Coast Conference
- Nickname: Tar Heels
- Colors: Carolina blue and white

NCAA Tournament championships
- (5) - 1981, 1982, 1986, 1991, 2016

NCAA Tournament Runner-Up
- (1) - 1993

NCAA Tournament Final Fours
- (14) - 1980, 1981, 1982, 1983, 1984, 1985, 1986, 1989, 1990, 1991, 1992, 1993, 2016, 2021

NCAA Tournament Quarterfinals
- (26) - 1976, 1977, 1980, 1981, 1982, 1983, 1984, 1985, 1986, 1987, 1989, 1990, 1991, 1992, 1993, 1994, 1996, 2004, 2007, 2009, 2010, 2013, 2015, 2016, 2021, 2026

NCAA Tournament appearances
- (35) - 1976, 1977, 1980, 1981, 1982, 1983, 1984, 1985, 1986, 1987, 1988, 1989, 1990, 1991, 1992, 1993, 1994, 1995, 1996, 1998, 2004, 2007, 2008, 2009, 2010, 2011, 2012, 2013, 2014, 2015, 2016, 2017, 2021, 2025, 2026

Conference Tournament championships
- (9) - 1989, 1990, 1991, 1992, 1993, 1994, 1996, 2013, 2017

Conference regular season championships
- (15) - 1941, 1981, 1982, 1985, 1988, 1991, 1992, 1994, 1996, 2003, 2010, 2013, 2016, 2021, 2025

The North Carolina Tar Heels men's lacrosse team represents the University of North Carolina at Chapel Hill in National Collegiate Athletic Association (NCAA) Division I men's lacrosse. North Carolina currently competes as a member of the Atlantic Coast Conference (ACC) and plays its home games at Dorrance Field and Kenan Memorial Stadium in Chapel Hill, North Carolina. Their main rivalry series is with fellow ACC member Duke.

== Overview ==
A club team was established at the school in 1937, but didn't play until 1938. That team played until the start of World War II until another club team was established for the 1944 season. When lacrosse returned to campus in 1949, it was elevated to varsity status. Carolina rose to national prominence in the late 1970s under Hall of Fame coach and former Johns Hopkins Blue Jay Willie Scroggs. The program's first 1st-team All-American in Division I was defenseman Ralph "Rip" Davy in 1979. Between 1980 and 1996, the UNC lacrosse team qualified for the NCAA tournament 14 of the 16 years. During that span, Carolina also won 11 ACC titles. In 1981, the Tar Heels began a 26-game winning streak, and won the national championship in 1981, 1982 and 1986.

The UNC lacrosse program won its fifth national title in 2016, beating Maryland 14-13 in an overtime thriller. At 12-6 on the season, UNC entered the NCAA tournament unseeded at 8-6. They became the first unseeded national champion in the last 45 years. This is the first title since 1991, when they won their fourth national title, going undefeated on the season at 16-0. Since then, UNC won four of five ACC championship games between 1992 and 1996.

== History ==
=== 1937–1954 ===
The first lacrosse team was formed in 1937 at the club level. At the time, they used old equipment from the football team and competed in the Dixie Lacrosse League against Duke, Virginia, Washington & Lee, Loyola, and the Washington Lacrosse Club. The Tar Heels were the Dixie Lacrosse League champions for 1941. In 1949, the university conferred varsity status on the team, and in 1950, North Carolina became a member of the United States Intercollegiate Lacrosse Association (USILA). The following season, goalie Nick Sowell became the Tar Heels' first All-American when he was named to the USILA Honorable Mention team.

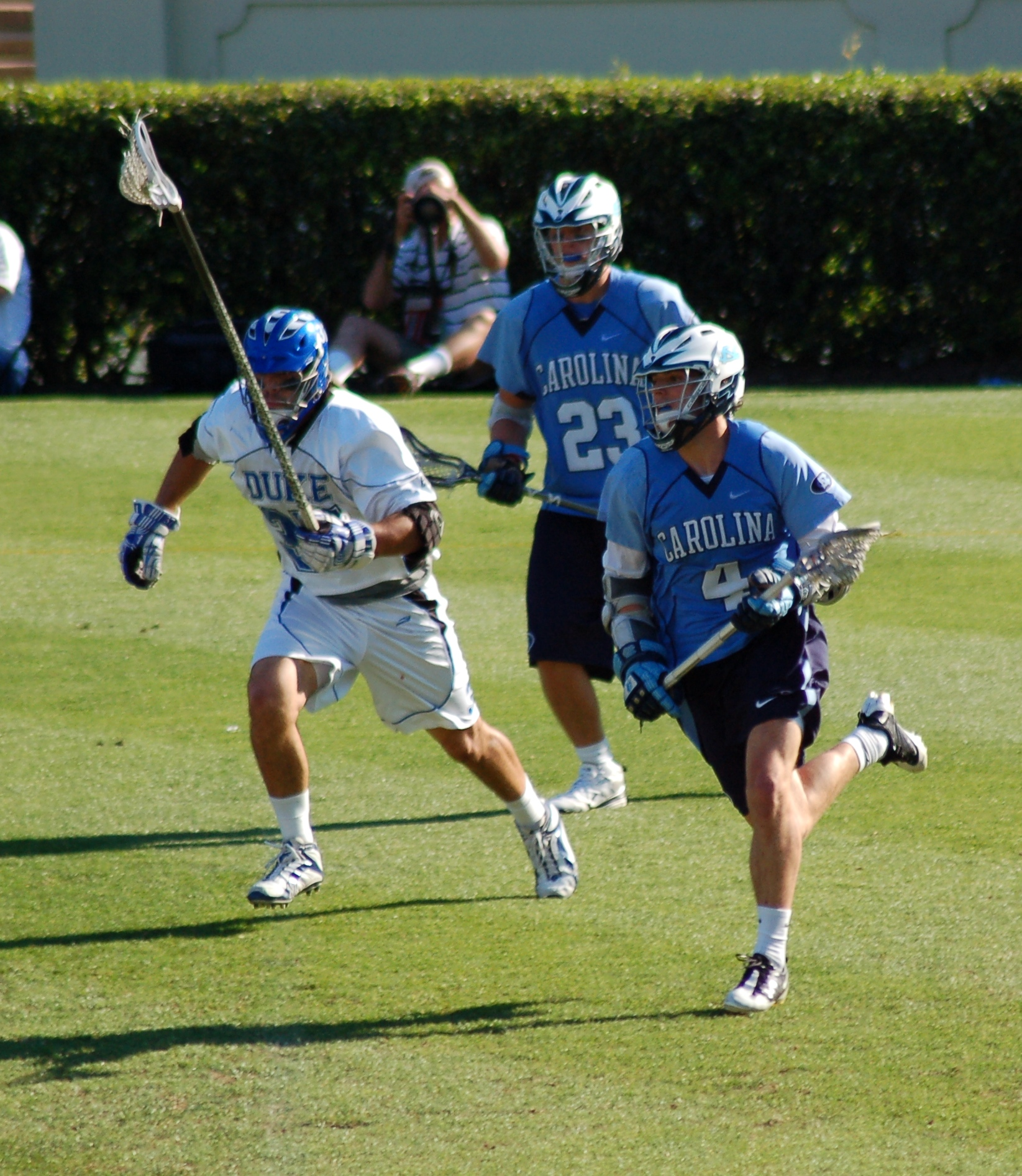
Carolina players in action against Duke in the 2009 ACC final.

In 1954, after compiling a combined 14-43-1 record in its first six seasons, the varsity team was disbanded by the administration to focus on other sports.

=== 1964–1974 ===
Lacrosse returned as a varsity sport in 1964. In 1974, Paul Doty took over as head coach. That year, the school started awarding scholarships for the sport and was promoted from the small college level (now Division II and Division III) to Division I.

=== 1979–1990 ===
In 1979, William Scroggs became the head coach at North Carolina and led the Tar Heels to six ACC titles, three NCAA championships, and 11 appearances in the NCAA Tournament during a 12-year career. He compiled a record of 120-37 (.764) as the head coach at North Carolina, with NCAA titles in 1981, 1982, and 1986.

Scroggs led the Heels to 26 straight wins and two titles over the two years, 1981 and 1982. He would retire after a loss to Syracuse University in the Semifinals of the NCAA Tournament. From 1986 to 1990, Scroggs coached Joe Breschi, who later became the coach of the UNC Men's Lacrosse team.

=== 1991–2000 ===
In 1991, first-year head coach Dave Klarmann replaced Willie Scroggs and led the Tar Heels through an undefeated regular season. Carolina extended its winning streak throughout the postseason, first winning the ACC tournament, and then defeating Loyola, Syracuse, and Towson succeeding to post a perfect 16–0 mark and capture the NCAA national championship. Klarmann's teams repeated as ACC tournament champions in 1992 before advancing to the NCAA Championship semifinal, where they fell to third-seeded Princeton, 16-14. In 1993 and 1994, Carolina again captured the ACC title, but fell to Syracuse in the NCAA Championship 13-12 in 1993 and suffered an early exit in the 1994 NCAA tournament. In the late 1990s, the Tar Heels struggled, alternately, to qualify for or advance in the NCAA tournament.

At the end of the head coach's Dave Klarmann's time at UNC (10 years, one national championship, five ACC tournament championships) there were a series of off-the-field incidents between 1995 and 1999. One player died of a gunshot wound, another from asphyxiation, another was injured from a stabbing in a nightclub and a fourth had a serious illness.

=== 2001–2008 ===
John Haus replaced Klarmann as head coach for the 2001 season. John Haus was UNC's head coach from 2001 to 2008. In his fourth year, Carolina advanced to the NCAA quarterfinals before losing to Johns Hopkins, 15–9. They returned to the NCAA tournament and quarterfinals in 2007, where they were defeated by second-seeded Duke, 19–11. In 2008, Carolina was knocked out of the first round by Navy.

=== 2009 ===
In 2009, alumnus Joe Breschi, a former first-team All-American defenseman in 1990 and USA national team member in 1990 and 1994, became head coach at his alma mater, after being a coach at Ohio State University. In Breschi's first season in 2009, North Carolina surprised many observers when the team returned to the NCAA quarterfinals, before losing to rival Duke 12-11. The lackluster performance as head coach from John Haus had brought many questions from fans on if UNC men's lacrosse could recover. Breschi took the challenge, and has completely rebuilt the program, transforming them into a top contender once again. Joe Breschi, Ryan Wade, Marcus Holman, Frank Riggs, Tommy Sears. Joey Sievold, Randy Cox, and Mac Ford are the only UNC players to play for the USA National Team.

=== 2010 ===
In 2010, The Baltimore Sun commented that "it's no longer a question whether Breschi can rebuild North Carolina, but when the Tar Heels will arrive." In his second season, Carolina again advanced to the quarterfinals before losing to Duke, 17–9. That season, North Carolina swept the ACC postseason awards, with Breschi named ACC Coach of the Year, junior attackman Billy Bitter named ACC Player of the Year, and Marcus Holman named ACC Freshman of the Year.

=== 2012 ===
UNC finished the 2012 season with an 11-6 record, for the sixth season in a row UNC had a winning record. UNC lost to Duke in the ACC Tournament final game. UNC received a #8 seed in the 16-team 2012 NCAA tournament. UNC lost in the first round of the NCAA tournament to Denver 14-16. Denver lost in the next round to eventual champion Loyola (Md.). It was the second year in a row UNC lost in the first round of the NCAA tournament.

=== 2013 ===
UNC attained a #1 ranking in the 2013 season and won the ACC tournament. Attackman Marcus Holman was the second player in UNC lacrosse history to be named a finalist for the annual Tewaaraton award given to the best college lacrosse player. Attackman Jed Prosser was UNC's first finalist in 2004.

== Season Results ==
The following is a list of North Carolina's results by season as an NCAA Division I program:

Season	Coach	Overall	Conference	Standing	Postseason
Fred Mueller (Atlantic Coast Conference) (1969–1972)
1971	Fred Mueller	6–5	1–2	3rd	
1972	Fred Mueller	7–5	1–2	3rd	
Fred Mueller:		27–16 (.628)	4–8 (.333)		
Ron Miller (Atlantic Coast Conference) (1973–1974)
1973	Ron Miller	12–5	2–2	3rd	
Ron Miller:		12–5 (.706)	2–2 (.500)		
Paul Doty (Atlantic Coast Conference) (1974–1978)
1974	Paul Doty	6–5	2–2	3rd	
1975	Paul Doty	8–6	2–2	T–2nd	
1976	Paul Doty	9–3	3–1	2nd	NCAA Division I Quarterfinals
1977	Paul Doty	8–4	2–2	T–2nd	NCAA Division I Quarterfinals
1978	Paul Doty	6–6	1–3	4th	
Paul Doty:		37–24 (.607)	10–10 (.500)		
Willie Scroggs (Atlantic Coast Conference) (1979–1990)
1979	Willie Scroggs	5–3	1–3	4th	
1980	Willie Scroggs	8–4	2–2	T–3rd	NCAA Division I Final Four
1981	Willie Scroggs	12–0	4–0	1st	NCAA Division I Champion
1982	Willie Scroggs	14–0	4–0	1st	NCAA Division I Champion
1983	Willie Scroggs	9–4	1–2	3rd	NCAA Division I Final Four
1984	Willie Scroggs	9–4	2–1	2nd	NCAA Division I Final Four
1985	Willie Scroggs	10–3	2–1	T–1st	NCAA Division I Final Four
1986	Willie Scroggs	11–3	1–2	3rd	NCAA Division I Champion
1987	Willie Scroggs	9–4	1–2	3rd	NCAA Division I Quarterfinals
1988	Willie Scroggs	9–3	3–0	1st	NCAA Division I Quarterfinals
1989	Willie Scroggs	13–5	2–1	2nd	NCAA Division I Final Four
1990	Willie Scroggs	12–4	2–1	2nd	NCAA Division I Final Four
Willie Scroggs:		121–37 (.766)	25–15 (.625)		
Dave Klarmann (Atlantic Coast Conference) (1991–2000)
1991	Dave Klarmann	16–0	3–0	1st	NCAA Division I Champion
1992	Dave Klarmann	12–3	3–0	1st	NCAA Division I Final Four
1993	Dave Klarmann	14–2	2–1	2nd	NCAA Division I Runner–Up
1994	Dave Klarmann	10–5	2–1	T–1st	NCAA Division I Quarterfinals
1995	Dave Klarmann	9–7	1–2	3rd	NCAA Division I First Round
1996	Dave Klarmann	12–5	2–1	T–1st	NCAA Division I Quarterfinals
1997	Dave Klarmann	6–7	0–3	4th	
1998	Dave Klarmann	7–8	0–3	4th	NCAA Division I First Round
1999	Dave Klarmann	6–9	1–2	T–3rd	
2000	Dave Klarmann	8–6	0–3	4th	
Dave Klarmann:		100–52 (.658)	14–16 (.467)		
John Haus (Atlantic Coast Conference) (2001–2008)
2001	John Haus	6–6	1–2	T–3rd	
2002	John Haus	8–5	1–2	T–2nd	
2003	John Haus	7–6	2–1	T–1st	
2004	John Haus	10–5	2–1	2nd	NCAA Division I Quarterfinals
2005	John Haus	5–8	0–3	4th	
2006	John Haus	4–10	0–3	3rd	
2007	John Haus	10–6	0–3	4th	NCAA Division I Quarterfinals
2008	John Haus	8–6	0–3	4th	NCAA Division I First Round
John Haus:		58–52 (.527)	6–18 (.250)		
Joe Breschi (Atlantic Coast Conference) (2009–Present)
2009	Joe Breschi	12–6	0–3	4th	NCAA Division I Quarterfinals
2010	Joe Breschi	13–3	2–1	T–1st	NCAA Division I Quarterfinals
2011	Joe Breschi	10–6	1–2	T–2nd	NCAA Division I First Round
2012	Joe Breschi	11–6	1–2	T–3rd	NCAA Division I First Round
2013	Joe Breschi	13–4	2–1	T–1st	NCAA Division I Quarterfinals
2014	Joe Breschi	10–5	2–3	T–3rd	NCAA Division I First Round
2015	Joe Breschi	13–4	3–1	2nd	NCAA Division I Quarterfinals
2016	Joe Breschi	12–6	3–1	T–1st	NCAA Division I Champion
2017	Joe Breschi	8–8	1–3	4th	NCAA Division I First Round
2018	Joe Breschi	7–7	1–3	T–3rd	
2019	Joe Breschi	8–7	1–3	5th	
2020	Joe Breschi	7–0	0–0	†	†
2021	Joe Breschi	13–3	4–2	T–1st	NCAA Division I Final Four
2022	Joe Breschi	8–6	1–5	T–4th	
2023	Joe Breschi	7–7	1–5	T–4th	
2024	Joe Breschi	7–7	1–3	T–3rd	
2025	Joe Breschi	10–5	3–1	T–1st	NCAA Division I First Round
2026	Joe Breschi	13–5	2–2	T–2nd	NCAA Division I Quarterfinals
Joe Breschi:		183–95 (.658)	29–41 (.414)		
Total:		568–341–2 (.625)			
National champion Postseason invitational champion Conference regular season champion Conference regular season and conference tournament champion Division regular season champion Division regular season and conference tournament champion Conference tournament champion

†NCAA canceled 2020 collegiate activities due to the COVID-19 virus.

- UNC Lacrosse site

== Individual honors ==
=== Retired numbers ===
North Carolina Tar Heels retired numbers
No.	Player	Pos.	Career	No. Ret.	Ref.
10	Dennis Goldstein		1988–92?	2003	
13	Tom Haus		1983–87	2003	
27	Tom Sears	GK	1980–83	2003	

=== Alumni in the Premier Lacrosse League ===
Year Drafted	Name	Position	Height	Weight	Drafted By	Draft Pick	Current Team	All Star	Accolades
2013	Marcus Holman	Attack	5'10	180	Ohio Machine (MLL)	2nd round (12th overall)	Archers LC	2x All Star ('19,'21)	None
2014	Mark McNeill	D Midfield	6'3	215	Chesapeake Bayhawks (MLL)	7th round (50th overall)	Archers LC	1x All Star ('21)	None
2017	Austin Pifani	Defense	6'2	205	New York Lizards (MLL)	2nd round (14th overall)	Atlas LC	None	None
2017	Stephen Kelly	Faceoff	5'11	185	Chesapeake Bayhawks (MLL)	6th round (48th overall)	Cannons LC	1x All Star ('21)	None
2018	Chris Cloutier	Attack	5'11	220	Denver Outlaws (MLL)	4th round (29th overall)	Chaos LC	None	None
2019	Jack Rowlett	Defense	6'1	195	Chaos LC	2nd round (7th overall)	Chaos LC	2x All Star ('19,'20)	None
2021	Tanner Cook	Midfield	6'4	215	Chaos LC	2nd round (15th overall)	Chaos LC	None	None
2021	Justin Anderson	Midfield	6'0	195	Chrome LC	3rd round (20th overall)	Chrome LC	None	None
2022	Chris Gray	Attack	5'7	170	Atlas LC	1st round (2nd overall)	Atlas LC	None	None

=== First Team All-Americans ===
Year	Player(s)
1979	Ralph "Rip" Davy
1980	Kevin Griswold
1981	Michael Burnett, Douglas Hall, Thomas Sears
1982	Michael Burnett, John Haus, Jeffrey Homire, Peter Voelkel, Thomas Sears*
1984	Thomas Haus, Joseph Seivold
1985	Mac Ford, Joseph Seivold
1986	Thomas Haus*
1987	Thomas Haus
1988	Boyd Harden
1990	Joe Breschi
1991	Dennis Goldstein*, Graham Harden, Andy Piazza
1992	Jim Buczek, Alex Martin
1993	Alex Martin, Greg Paradine, Ryan Wade
1994	Ryan Wade
1996	Jude Collins, Jason Wade
2004	Jed Prossner, Ronnie Staines
2005	Jed Prossner
2009	Billy Bitter
2010	Billy Bitter, Ryan Flanagan
2012	RG Keenan,
2013	Marcus Holman,
2015	Chad Tutton, Ryan Kilpatrick
2017	Austin Pifani
2021	Chris Gray
2022	Chris Gray

*Player of the Year

=== Former players in Major League Lacrosse (MLL) ===
Major League Lacrosse (MLL) currently has eight teams. The 2013 season starts at the end of April and ends in August. There are four former UNC players who played for MLL teams in the 2012 season. Billy Bitter (attack, UNC '11) and Ryan Flanagan (defenseman, UNC '11) played for the Charlotte Hounds in the 2012 season. Flanagan is currently on the Charlotte Hounds roster for the 2013 season. Ben Hunt (midfielder, UNC '09) and Tim Kaiser (defenseman, UNC '08) play for the Chesapeake Bayhawks.

Only seniors with expiring eligibility are eligible to be drafted by MLL teams in the annual January drafts. After the NCAA season is completed on Memorial Day, the MLL will allow all undrafted seniors who completed their eligibility to register for a player pool, giving MLL teams an opportunity to select the undrafted players for one week. The Ohio Machine selected current senior Marcus Holman in the second round of the last MLL draft.
