= UMass Minutemen lacrosse =

American college lacrosse team

UMass Minutemen men's lacrosse
- University: University of Massachusetts Amherst
- Head coach: Kyle Smith (since 2026 season)
- Stadium: Garber Field (capacity: 5,000)
- Location: Amherst, Massachusetts
- Conference: Atlantic 10 Conference
- Nickname: Minutemen
- Colors: Maroon and white

NCAA Tournament Runner-Up
- (1) - 2006

NCAA Tournament Final Fours
- (3) - NCAA - 2006; USILA – 1972, 1973

NCAA Tournament Quarterfinals
- (11) - 1976, 1977, 1979, 1981, 1986, 1989, 1997, 2002, 2003, 2005, 2006

NCAA Tournament appearances
- (20) - 1976, 1977, 1979, 1981, 1986, 1987, 1988, 1989, 1990, 1991, 1993, 1995, 1997, 2002, 2003, 2005, 2006, 2009, 2012, 2018

Conference Tournament championships
- (2) - 2012, 2018

Conference regular season championships
- (8) - 2001, 2002, 2005, 2009, 2012, 2018, 2019, 2022

The UMass Minutemen men's lacrosse team represents the University of Massachusetts Amherst in National Collegiate Athletic Association (NCAA) NCAA Division I men's lacrosse. (Note: UMass women's teams are known as "Minutewomen".) As of July 1, 2022, the Minutemen compete in their full-time home of the Atlantic 10 Conference (A-10), which is establishing a men's lacrosse league.

== History ==
UMass had competed in the ECAC Lacrosse League since 2000, but in 2010 transferred to the Colonial Athletic Association (CAA). They play their home games at Garber Field in Amherst, Massachusetts. The Minutemen have fielded a varsity team since 1954. Since that time, there have only named 4 head coaches: Al Goodyear in 1954, Dick Garber (after which the present lacrosse field is named) from 1955 to 1990, Ted Garber from 1991 to 1994, and the present coach Greg Cannella beginning in 1995.

They have been New England ILA Champions 21 times (1963, 1969, 1974, 1976, 1977, 1978, 1979, 1981, 1984, 1986, 1987, 1988, 1989, 1990, 1993, 1997, 2002, 2003, 2005, and 2006). Prior to the NCAA, they reached the semifinals in the USILA tournament in 1972 and 1973.

UMass reached the NCAA finals in 2006, becoming just the third unseeded team to reach the finals. In the 2002 tournament, the Minutemen came closest to another Final Four appearance, scoring two goals in the final 25 seconds of regulation to tie their game, but losing to Johns Hopkins in overtime.

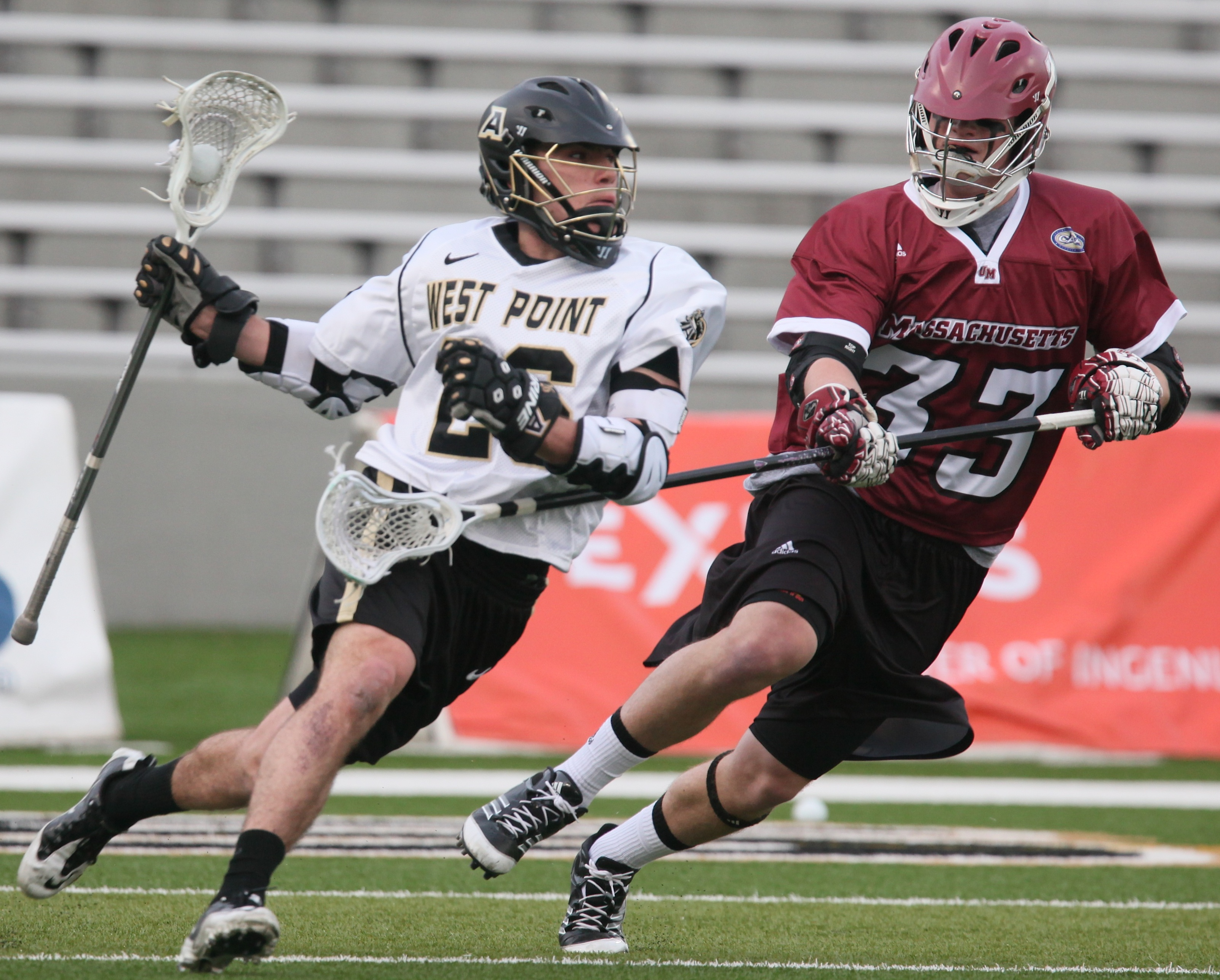
A lacrosse game between UMass and Army in 2012

== Notable players and coaches ==
- Roy Condon
- Kevin Leveille
- Sal LoCascio
- Will Manny
- Mark Millon
- Sean Morris
- Jeff Zywicki

== Season results ==
The following is a list of UMass's results by season since the institution of NCAA Division I in 1971:

Season	Coach	Overall	Conference	Standing	Postseason
Richard Garber (Independent) (1959–1990)
1971	Richard Garber	10–2			
1972	Richard Garber	12–4			USILA Semifinals
1973	Richard Garber	11–4			USILA Semifinals
1974	Richard Garber	11–2			
1975	Richard Garber	9–3			
1976	Richard Garber	10–3			NCAA Division I Quarterfinals
1977	Richard Garber	11–4			NCAA Division I Quarterfinals
1978	Richard Garber	9–5			
1979	Richard Garber	8–5			NCAA Division I Quarterfinals
1980	Richard Garber	8–5			
1981	Richard Garber	13–2			NCAA Division I Quarterfinals
1982	Richard Garber	8–5			
1983	Richard Garber	5–10			
1984	Richard Garber	8–4			
1985	Richard Garber	6–8			
1986	Richard Garber	10–5			NCAA Division I Quarterfinals
1987	Richard Garber	8–3			NCAA Division I First Round
1988	Richard Garber	10–3			NCAA Division I First Round
1989	Richard Garber	13–3			NCAA Division I Quarterfinals
1990	Richard Garber	10–5			NCAA Division I First Round
Richard Garber:		300–141–3 (.679)			
Ted Garber (Independent) (1991–1994)
1991	Ted Garber	9–4			NCAA Division I First Round
1992	Ted Garber	9–3			
1993	Ted Garber	10–5			NCAA Division I First Round
1994	Ted Garber	9–5			
Ted Garber:		37–17 (.685)			
Greg Cannella (Independent) (1995–1999)
1995	Greg Cannella	7–6			NCAA Division I First Round
1996	Greg Cannella	7–5			
1997	Greg Cannella	9–6			NCAA Division I Quarterfinals
1998	Greg Cannella	7–5			
1999	Greg Cannella	4–8			
Greg Cannella (ECAC Lacrosse League) (2000–2009)
2000	Greg Cannella	6–8	2–4	5th	
2001	Greg Cannella	12–2	5–1	T–1st	
2002	Greg Cannella	12–4	5–0	1st	NCAA Division I Quarterfinals
2003	Greg Cannella	13–3	3–2	T–2nd	NCAA Division I Quarterfinals
2004	Greg Cannella	7–7	2–1	2nd	
2005	Greg Cannella	13–3	5–1	T–1st	NCAA Division I Quarterfinals
2006	Greg Cannella	13–5	5–2	2nd	NCAA Division I Runner–Up
2007	Greg Cannella	7–7	4–3	3rd	
2008	Greg Cannella	5–9	3–2	4th	
2009	Greg Cannella	9–6	6–1	1st	NCAA Division I First Round
Greg Cannella (Colonial Athletic Association) (2010–2022)
2010	Greg Cannella	8–6	2–3	T–4th	
2011	Greg Cannella	10–5	4–1	T–2nd	
2012	Greg Cannella	15–1	5–0	1st	NCAA Division I First Round
2013	Greg Cannella	7–8	2–4	T–4th	
2014	Greg Cannella	7–6	1–4	T–5th	
2015	Greg Cannella	5–10	2–3	T–4th	
2016	Greg Cannella	4–9	0–5	6th	
2017	Greg Cannella	7–8	3–2	T–2nd	
2018	Greg Cannella	12–5	5–0	1st	NCAA Division I First Round
2019	Greg Cannella	10–5	4–1	T–1st	
2020	Greg Cannella	5–2	0–0	†	†
2021	Greg Cannella	4–6	4–4	T–3rd	
2022	Greg Cannella	8–6	3–2	T–1st	
Greg Cannella (Atlantic 10 Conference) (2023–present)
2023	Greg Cannella	8–6	3–2	3rd	
2024	Greg Cannella	6–8	2–3	4th	
2025	Greg Cannella	9–5	2–3	T–3rd	
Greg Cannella:		256–179 (.589)	80–54 (.597)		
Total:		593–337–3 (.637)			
National champion Postseason invitational champion Conference regular season champion Conference regular season and conference tournament champion Division regular season champion Division regular season and conference tournament champion Conference tournament champion

†NCAA canceled 2020 collegiate activities due to COVID-19.

== See also ==
- 2006 NCAA Division I Men's Lacrosse Championship
- Doc Schneider
