= Ridley Athletic Complex =

Multi-sport facility owned and operated by Loyola University Maryland

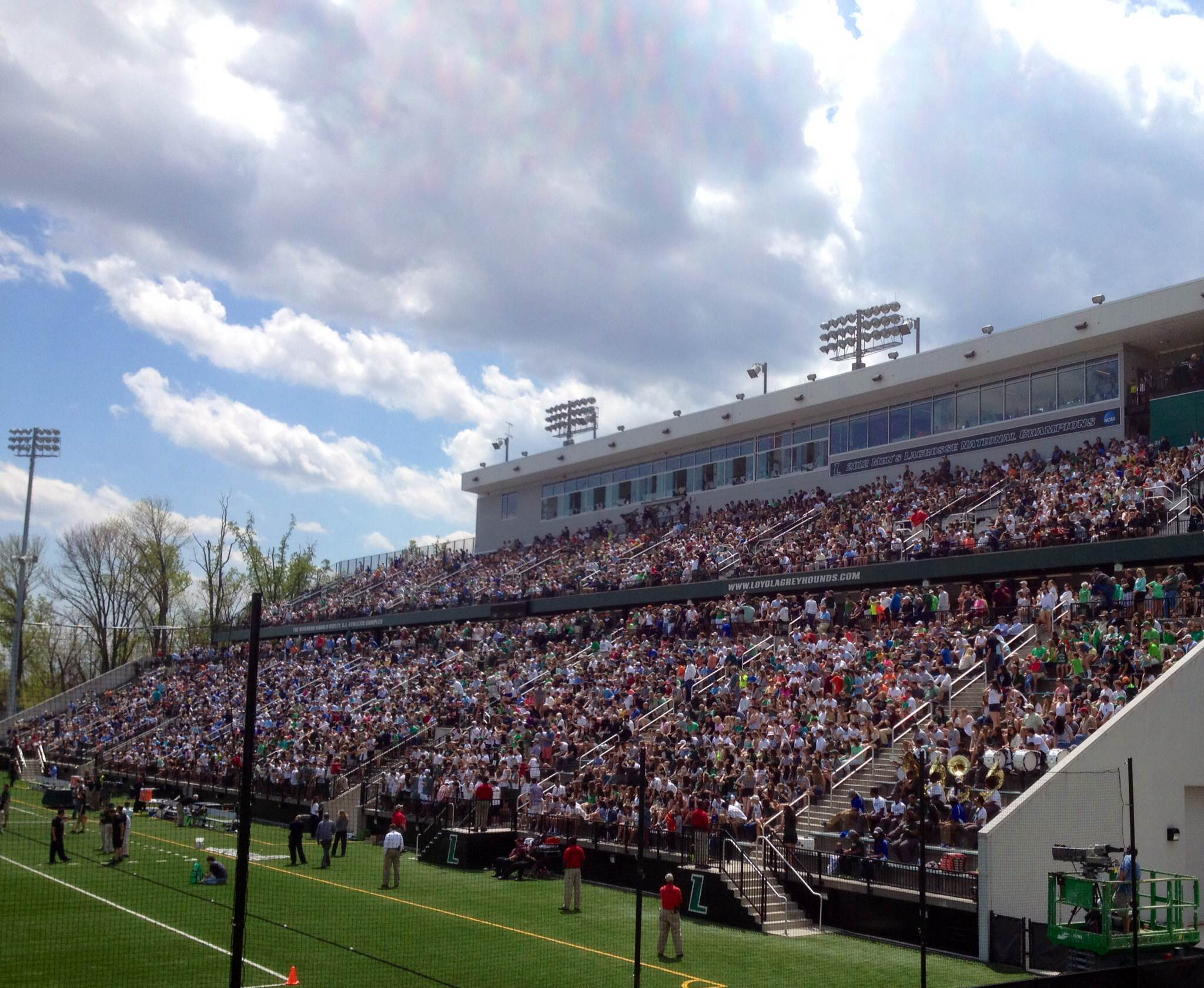
- Stand of the complex during a match in 2014
- Interactive map of Ridley Athletic Complex
- Address: 2221 W Cold Spring Ln; Baltimore, MD; United States
- Coordinates: 39°20′13″N 76°39′09″W
- Owner: Loyola University
- Operator: Loyola University Athletics
- Capacity: 6,000
- Type: Stadium
- Surface: Sportexe Momentum artificial turf
- Current use: Soccer; Lacrosse; Rugby union

Construction
- Groundbreaking: 2006
- Opened: March 13, 2010; 16 years ago
- Cost: $62 million USD

Tenants
- Loyola Greyhounds (NCAA) teams: men's and women's soccer (2010–present); men's and women's lacrosse (2010–present); rugby (2010–present)

Website
- loyolagreyhounds.com/ridley-complex

Ridley Athletic Complex is a stadium owned and operated by Loyola University Maryland. It is located 1.5 mi (2.4 km) west of the main campus in Baltimore, Maryland, on a 71 acres (28.7 ha) parcel of land at the southwest corner of the intersection of the Jones Falls Expressway and Coldspring Lane in the Woodberry neighborhood. At a total cost of US$62 million, it was the largest capital project in Loyola's history.

Named after Rev. Harold Ridley, S.J. at the request of an anonymous donor whose $5 million contribution was the most from an individual to the university, the complex consists of a 6,000-seat stadium for Loyola Greyhounds men's and women's soccer and lacrosse, an additional field for its men's rugby union club and eight courts for men's and women's tennis.

== History ==
The idea for the athletic complex originated in a 1995 conversation between Ridley, Loyola's president at the time, and athletic director Joe Boylan. Land for the smart-growth project was purchased in 1998, with 21 acres (8.5 ha) previously owned by LifeBridge Health and the other 50 acres (20.2 ha) by the city.

The project was stalled for years as the university faced opposition from Woodberry residents, mainly over environmental concerns since the parcel was once a landfill. Eventually the land underwent environmental remediation with the installation of geomembranes to prevent groundwater contamination and a collection system that captured gases from leaking into the atmosphere. Additionally 29 acres (12 ha) of the site were placed in forest conservation easements. Construction of the complex finally began in the spring of 2006.

The opening event at the Ridley was a friendly match on March 10, 2010, between the Loyola Greyhounds men's soccer team and Crystal Palace Baltimore in a fundraiser to benefit Catholic Relief Services' Haitian earthquake recovery efforts. The Greyhounds won 4–3. Its first intercollegiate contest there, a 3–1 loss to William & Mary, was played six months later on September 7. Palace hosted a regular-season game that summer on August 18, a 2–0 defeat to the Rochester Rhinos.

The official dedication ceremony for the whole complex was performed prior to the Loyola men's lacrosse home opener against Duke University on March 13, 2010. Mayor Stephanie Rawlings-Blake, Archbishop Edwin O'Brien and Loyola President Rev. Brian F. Linnane, S.J. led the celebration. The Greyhounds lost to the Blue Devils 8–5 in front of a sellout crowd. Women's sports premiered on March 16 with Loyola defeating Rutgers 18–6 in lacrosse. The first contest at the facility for the Greyhounds' women's soccer squad resulted in a 3–2 victory over Towson on August 21.

The Ridley was the site of the 2010 Metro Atlantic Athletic Conference Men's and Women's Soccer Championships. Between the host school's two teams, only the men qualified. They lost to Saint Peter's College 2–1 in two overtime periods in the semifinals on November 12. Two days later, the Peacocks defeated Iona College 2–1 for the championship. Siena College won the women's title one week earlier on November 7 with a 1–0 overtime victory over Canisius College.

The Greyhounds men's lacrosse team had an 18–1 overall record en route to its first-ever national championship in 2012. Its only defeat was a 10–9 overtime decision to Johns Hopkins at the Ridley on April 28.

The Baltimore Bohemians played all of its home matches during the 2013 season at the Ridley.

== Features ==
The centerpiece of the complex is J. Richard Awalt Field, named after the president of The Century Corporation who was a member of the Class of 1950 at Loyola College and a major factor in the facility's advancement. A 6,000-seat double-decked grandstand running the length of the field is situated along one side. The two decks are separated by a promenade with concession and merchandise stands, public restrooms and stairs that connect both levels. Overlooking the seating areas are press boxes and luxury suites. Eight sets of light standards, four on each side spread evenly apart, illuminate the stadium for nighttime events. A pair of video scoreboards featuring light-emitting diode technology were installed by Daktronics. The playing surface is Sportexe Momentum artificial turf.

The auxiliary practice field immediately to the south is named the Sean Lugano Memorial Field, in memory of the 1995 Loyola graduate and one-time captain of the university's men's rugby union team who died in the September 11, 2001 attacks on the World Trade Center. Lugano's family and friends raised over $1 million to name the field in his honor. It is the home of the "Loyola Rugby Football Club". The playing surface is the same as the one at Awalt Field. A seasonal Air Dome covering the field to provide indoor practice space during the winter was dedicated on January 17, 2018.

The McClure Tennis Center, which consists of eight lighted courts, opened on April 11, 2015. Financed by a $3.2 million gift from an anonymous donor, it is named for Rick McClure, the university's men's and women's tennis coach since 1979 who had been inducted in Loyola's hall of fame in November 2003.
