= Johns Hopkins–Loyola lacrosse rivalry =

Intercollegiate lacrosse rivalry

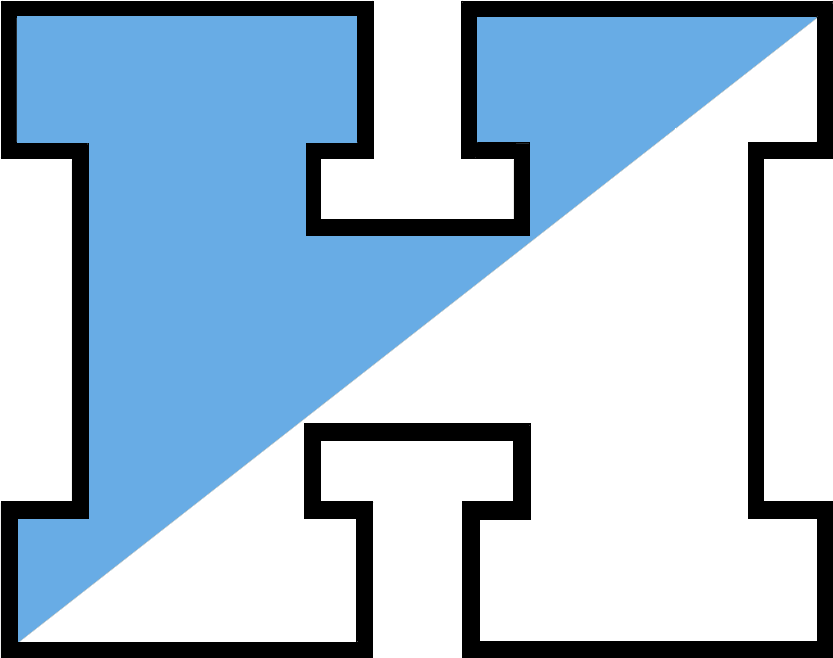
- Johns Hopkins Blue Jays Loyola Greyhounds
- First meeting: 1939; Johns Hopkins 20, Loyola 1
- Latest meeting: February 14, 2026; Johns Hopkins 13, Loyola 7

Statistics
- Total meetings: 62
- All-time series: Johns Hopkins leads, 52–10
- Largest victory: Johns Hopkins, 29–3 (1959)
- Longest win streak: Johns Hopkins, 30 (1939–1993)
- Current win streak: Johns Hopkins, 3 (2024–Present)

The Johns Hopkins–Loyola lacrosse rivalry is an intercollegiate lacrosse rivalry between Baltimore City's Johns Hopkins Blue Jays and Loyola Greyhounds. The teams first met in 1939, when Hopkins prevailed with a score of 20–1.

The series is known as both the "Charles Street Massacre" and the "Battle of Charles Street," depending on the school. Hopkins fans use the term "Charles Street Massacre" to refer to the historically lopsided on-field results and the school's continued dominance in the series. Loyola fans and some media outlets refer to the game using the more neutral-sounding term "Battle of Charles Street." Johns Hopkins won 31 straight meetings until Loyola finally snapped the streak with a victory in 1994. Both schools' campuses are located adjacent to Charles Street, which runs north-to-south through the city of Baltimore. Both teams maintain similar cross-street series with the Towson Tigers (see Loyola–Towson lacrosse rivalry).

After the Blue Jays' 29th consecutive victory in 1969, Loyola dropped Hopkins from its schedule. Loyola was an NCAA Division II program from 1973 to 1982 when it moved to I, while Johns Hopkins was Division I during that period. Subsequently, there was a 24-year hiatus in the series before its renewal in 1992. The Baltimore Sun asserted that in the later years before its revival, Johns Hopkins wished to avoid Loyola, as its team had grown significantly more competitive.

After its first victory in 1994, Loyola won again in 1998 and 1999. All three Loyola wins came under the guidance of head coach Dave Cottle. In the 1998 game, the Greyhounds set a school record of eleven consecutive wins by beating Johns Hopkins. Loyola (#1) entered the contest on April 28, 2012 ranked ahead of Hopkins (#10), but lost a 10–9 overtime decision at the Ridley Athletic Complex. This loss was the Greyhounds' only blemish on its first-ever national championship season.

== Rival Accomplishments ==
The following summarizes the accomplishments of the two programs.

Team	Johns Hopkins Blue Jays	Loyola Greyhounds
Pre-NCAA National Titles	35	0
NCAA National Titles	9	1
NCAA Final Four Appearances	29	5*
NCAA Tournament Appearances	47	26*
NCAA Tournament Record	71–38	17–25*
Conference Tournament Titles	2	6
Conference Championships	2	10
Tewaarton Award Recipients	1	1
Lt. Raymond Enners Award Recipients	11	1
Consensus First Team All-Americans	184	17
All-time Program Record	993–356–15	537–408–7
All-time Winning Percentage	.739	.568

- Loyola's 1979 and 1981 NCAA tournament appearances came at the Division II level.

== Game Results ==
Johns Hopkins victories	Loyola victories	Tie games

No.	Date	Location	Winner	Score
1	1939	Homewood Field	Johns Hopkins	20–1
2	1940	Homewood Field	Johns Hopkins	16–3
3	1941	Homewood Field	Johns Hopkins	9–0
4	1942	Homewood Field	Johns Hopkins	23–7
5	1943	Homewood Field	Johns Hopkins	12–4
6	1946	Homewood Field	Johns Hopkins	7–0
7	1947	Homewood Field	Johns Hopkins	19–1
8	1948	Homewood Field	Johns Hopkins	15–2
9	1949	Homewood Field	Johns Hopkins	20–6
10	1950	Homewood Field	Johns Hopkins	13–2
11	1951	Homewood Field	Johns Hopkins	12–8
12	1952	Homewood Field	Johns Hopkins	14–5
13	1953	Homewood Field	Johns Hopkins	16–7
14	1954	Homewood Field	Johns Hopkins	18–1
15	1955	Homewood Field	Johns Hopkins	13–0
16	1956	Homewood Field	Johns Hopkins	12–3
17	1957	Homewood Field	Johns Hopkins	22–7
18	1958	Homewood Field	Johns Hopkins	21–3
19	1959	Homewood Field	Johns Hopkins	29–3
20	1960	Homewood Field	Johns Hopkins	20–0
21	1961	Homewood Field	Johns Hopkins	22–4
22	1962	Loyola	Johns Hopkins	18–7

No.	Date	Location	Winner	Score
23	1963	Homewood Field	Johns Hopkins	19–1
24	1964	Homewood Field	Johns Hopkins	12–1
25	1965	Homewood Field	Johns Hopkins	10–6
26	1966	Homewood Field	Johns Hopkins	17–2
27	1967	Loyola	Johns Hopkins	18–3
28	1968	Homewood Field	Johns Hopkins	22–4
29	1969	Loyola	Johns Hopkins	23–4
30	1993	Homewood Field	#4 Johns Hopkins	16–11
31	1994	Diane Geppi-Aikens Field	#3 Loyola	17–15
32	1995	Homewood Field	#1 Johns Hopkins	12–11
33	1995	Homewood Field	#1 Johns Hopkins	18–5
34	1996	Diane Geppi-Aikens Field	#9 Johns Hopkins	12–10
35	1997	Homewood Field	#5 Johns Hopkins	14–12
36	1998	Diane Geppi-Aikens Field	#4 Loyola	10–7
37	1999	Homewood Field	#4 Loyola	14–5
38	2000	Diane Geppi-Aikens Field	#6 Johns Hopkins	16–12
39	2001	Homewood Field	#3 Johns Hopkins	13–10
40	2002	Diane Geppi-Aikens Field	#1 Johns Hopkins	8–4
41	2003	Homewood Field	#1 Johns Hopkins	17–6
42	2004	Diane Geppi-Aikens Field	#1 Johns Hopkins	11–7
43	2005	Homewood Field	#1 Johns Hopkins	12–6
44	2006	Diane Geppi-Aikens Field	#7 Johns Hopkins	7–6 ^{OT}

No.	Date	Location	Winner	Score
45	2007	Homewood Field	#5 Johns Hopkins	12–9
46	2008	Diane Geppi-Aikens Field	#5 Johns Hopkins	9–6
47	2009	Homewood Field	#8 Johns Hopkins	11–10^{2OT}
48	2010	Ridley Athletic Complex	Johns Hopkins	9–6
49	2011	Homewood Field	#2 Johns Hopkins	8–7
50	2012	Ridley Athletic Complex	#10 Johns Hopkins	10–9^{OT}
51	2013	Homewood Field	#7 Loyola	8–4
52	2014	Ridley Athletic Complex	#1 Loyola	13–10
53	2016	Ridley Athletic Complex	#8 Loyola	9–8
54	2017	Homewood Field	#5 Johns Hopkins	14–13^{OT}
55	2018	Ridley Athletic Complex	#14 Loyola	12–5
56	2019	Homewood Field	#2 Loyola	18–12
57	2020	Ridley Athletic Complex	#16 Loyola	10–7
58	2022	Homewood Field	#15 Johns Hopkins	11–10
59	2023	Ridley Athletic Complex	#11 Loyola	13–8
60	2024	Homewood Field	#9 Johns Hopkins	13–7
61	2025	Ridley Athletic Complex	#5 Johns Hopkins	9–8
62	2026	Homewood Field	#15 Johns Hopkins	13–7
Series: Johns Hopkins leads 52–10
