= Loyola Greyhounds men's lacrosse =

University sports team

- Founded: 1938
- University: Loyola University Maryland
- Head coach: Charley Toomey (since 2006 season)
- Stadium: Ridley Athletic Complex (capacity: 6,000)
- Location: Baltimore, Maryland
- Conference: Patriot League
- Nickname: Greyhounds
- Colors: Green and gray

NCAA Tournament championships
- (1) - 2012

NCAA Tournament Runner-Up
- (2) - 1981*, 1990

NCAA Tournament Final Fours
- (5) - 1981*, 1990, 1998, 2012, 2016

NCAA Tournament Quarterfinals
- (17) - 1981*, 1988, 1989, 1990, 1991, 1993, 1994, 1995, 1997, 1998, 1999, 2001, 2012, 2016, 2018, 2019, 2021

NCAA Tournament appearances
- (27) - 1979*, 1981*, 1988, 1989, 1990, 1991, 1992, 1993, 1994, 1995, 1996, 1997, 1998, 1999, 2000, 2001, 2007, 2008, 2010, 2012, 2013, 2014, 2016, 2017, 2018, 2019, 2021

Conference Tournament championships
- (6) - 2001, 2012, 2014, 2016, 2017, 2018

Conference regular season championships
- (10) - 2002, 2008, 2009, 2012, 2013, 2014, 2016, 2017, 2018, 2019, 2026; *Division II

The Loyola Greyhounds men's lacrosse team represents Loyola University Maryland in NCAA Division I lacrosse. Its home matches are played at the Ridley Athletic Complex. Charley Toomey has served as its head coach since 2006. It became a member of the Patriot League along with the university's other intercollegiate athletic programs on July 1, 2013. The Greyhounds were a member of the ECAC Lacrosse League from 2005 to 2013. It became the first member of the conference to win a national championship in 2012. It was also the first national title in the university's Division I history.

Loyola, a Jesuit university with over 3,700 undergraduates, has produced 13 USILA First Team All-Americans, 25 Second Team All-Americans, 18 Third Team All-Americans, and 68 Honorable Mention All-Americans. The Greyhounds local rivals are the Johns Hopkins Blue Jays, located just down Charles Street. The annual lacrosse game played between these two institutions is known as the "Battle of Charles Street". The program also has another significant rival in Baltimore, maintaining an annual series with the Towson Tigers since 1959.

== History ==
=== Beginnings ===
The Loyola Greyhounds men's lacrosse team was founded in 1938 and coached by Jack Kelly. Kelly coached five seasons before leaving after 1942, with an overall winning record consisting of 21 wins and 14 losses. The Greyhounds struggled after Kelly left, going through two coaches in two seasons, both of which did not break .250. In 1947 began the reign of the program's longest active coach until that time, Bishop Baker. Baker coached for six consecutive seasons, almost breaking even with wins and losses. He was followed by John Mohler, who only coached for one year.

=== Charles Wenzel ===
For 17 seasons, from 1954 to 1970, the Greyhounds were coached by Charles Wenzel. Under Wenzel, the Greyhounds went .379.

=== Dave Cottle ===
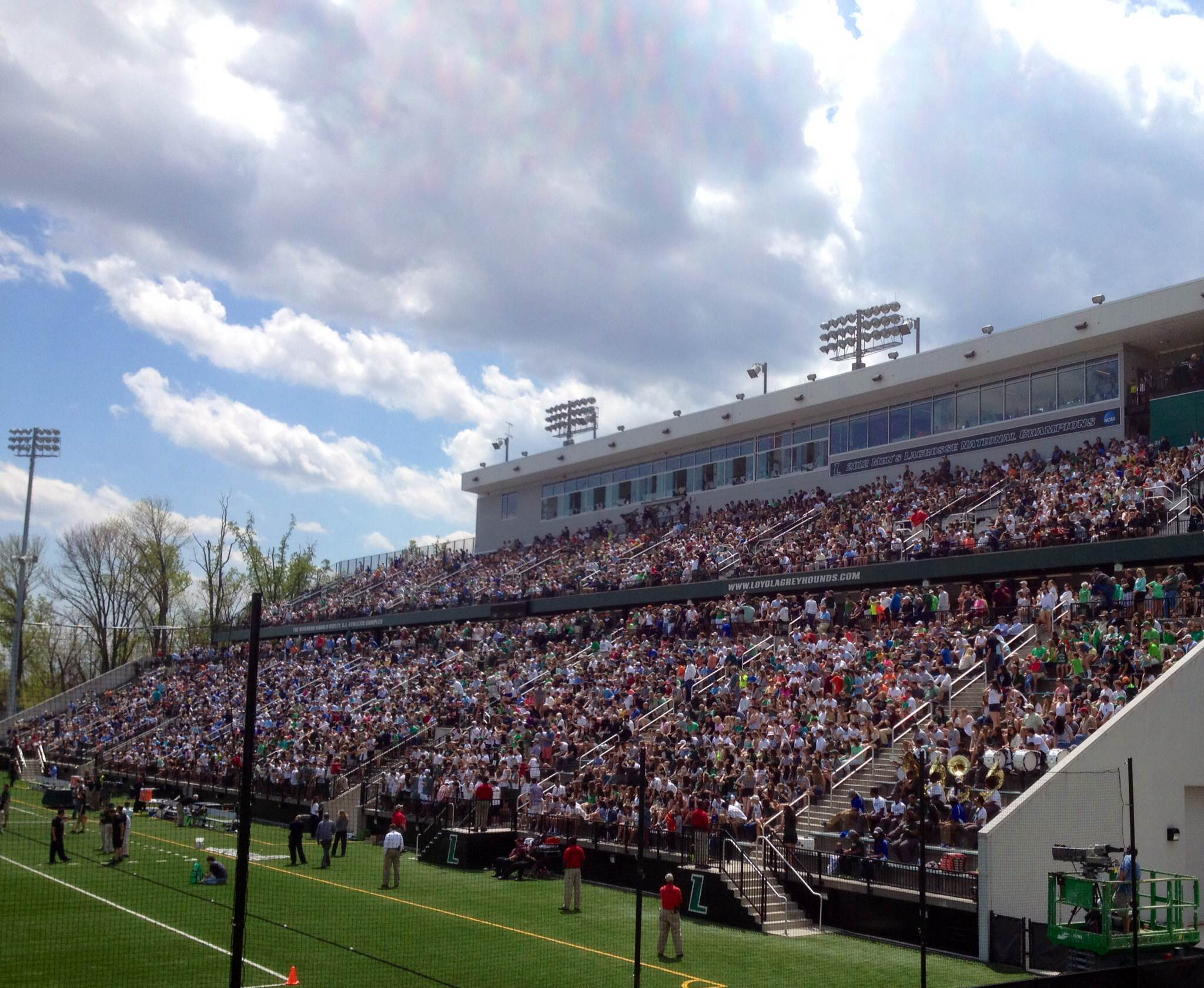
Men and women's lacrosse play home games at the Ridley Athletic Complex

From 1983 to 2001, for almost two decades under Head Coach Dave Cottle, Loyola saw growth in to their lacrosse program. In 1982, Loyola moved up from NCAA Division II lacrosse. Starting in 1983, Cottle brought the Greyhounds national attention. The Greyhounds advanced to the 1990 NCAA Division I Men's Lacrosse Championship game where they were defeated by the Syracuse Orangemen. The 1990 championship, however, was revoked from Syracuse when investigations deemed the activity between coach Roy Simmons, Jr.'s wife Nancy and star player Paul Gait illegal. She signed the lease of his car earlier that season. Though the NCAA has yet to remove Syracuse from the record book, Loyola was the runner up and technically is the next in line for the trophy.

In 1999, the Greyhounds went undefeated in the regular season before losing in the quarterfinals of the 1999 NCAA tournament. His run lasted 19 seasons, beginning in 1983 through 2001, Cottle coached his teams to a winning record of 181 wins and 70 losses, including a run of 14 straight seasons where Loyola received an NCAA tournament bid.

=== Charley Toomey ===
Following Cottle's long coaching tenure, Loyola hired Bill Dirrigl as their head coach. After four seasons Dirrigl was fired and Loyola graduate Charley Toomey took over as head coach in 2006. In both 2007 and 2008, Toomey led the Greyhounds to the NCAA Men's Lacrosse Championship tournament. The 2010 and 2011 NCAA lacrosse championships were held at M&T Bank Stadium. Loyola, worked in conjunction with Johns Hopkins, Towson, and UMBC to run these events. The Hounds failed to advance to the 2009 NCAA lacrosse playoffs despite having the ninth place RPI, the third highest strength of schedule, and a 9-5 record. Instead Brown gained the slot because of their wins over Cornell and University of Massachusetts. Brown had an RPI of twelve, their schedule ranked a low of thirty six, and were ranked third in the Ivy League. Coach Toomey compared the 2009 Greyhound's dilemma to that of the 2006 Harvard squad saying, "I can remember in 2006, Harvard gets in at 6-6, losing their last three games, and they said, ‘It's not a numbers thing, it's a strength-of-schedule thing.’ ... So what is it going to be? Is it going to be big wins or numbers? If it's numbers, we look doggone good. If it's about big wins, then we might be on the outside looking in." Harvard made the tournament over Toomey's squad that season, the reason being that their 'big wins' were not as competitive as Harvard's record, RPI and SOS. RPI vs. Big wins has been a very large argument in the NCAA tournament selection process the past few years.

The Greyhounds captured the first national championship in Loyola's Division I history in a 9–3 victory over Maryland at Gillette Stadium on May 28, 2012. They finished at 18–1, establishing a new program record for most wins in a campaign. Its only loss was a regular-season-ending 10–9 overtime defeat at home to Johns Hopkins on April 28. The team was led by attackers Eric Lusby and Mike Sawyer. Lusby was named the Championship's Most Outstanding Player after scoring four times in the Final and whose 17 goals were the most in a single NCAA tournament. He also set the school record for most goals in a single season with 54. Sawyer, who had previously set the school's new single-season scoring mark earlier in the season, was Loyola's first-ever Tewaaraton Trophy finalist.

== Season Results ==
The following is a list of Loyola's season results since the institution of NCAA Division I in 1971 (Loyola competed in NCAA Division II until 1983):

Season	Coach	Overall	Conference	Standing	Postseason
James Barnhardt (Independent) (1971–1972)
1971	James Barnhardt	5–8			
1972	James Barnhardt	1–10			
James Barnhardt:		6–18 (.250)			
Rick Buck (Independent) (1973–1974)
1973	Rick Buck	3–10			
1974	Rick Buck	2–12			
Rick Buck:		5–22 (.185)			
Jay Connor (Independent) (1975–1982)
1975	Jay Connor	3–9			
1976	Jay Connor	7–5			
1977	Jay Connor	6–7			
1978	Jay Connor	7–7			
1979	Jay Connor	11–4			NCAA Division II First Round
1980	Jay Connor	10–2			
1981	Jay Connor	11–5			NCAA Division II Runner–Up
1982	Jay Connor	6–7			
Jay Connor:		61–46 (.570)			
Dave Cottle (Independent) (1983–2000)
1983	Dave Cottle	5–9			
1984	Dave Cottle	10–4			
1985	Dave Cottle	8–5			
1986	Dave Cottle	7–4			
1987	Dave Cottle	8–3			
1988	Dave Cottle	12–2			NCAA Division I Quarterfinals
1989	Dave Cottle	10–1			NCAA Division I Quarterfinals
1990	Dave Cottle	11–3			NCAA Division I Runner–Up
1991	Dave Cottle	9–4			NCAA Division I Quarterfinals
1992	Dave Cottle	8–4			NCAA Division I First Round
1993	Dave Cottle	8–5			NCAA Division I Quarterfinals
1994	Dave Cottle	11–2			NCAA Division I Quarterfinals
1995	Dave Cottle	11–4			NCAA Division I Quarterfinals
1996	Dave Cottle	7–6			NCAA Division I First Round
1997	Dave Cottle	10–4			NCAA Division I Quarterfinals
1998	Dave Cottle	13–2			NCAA Division I Final Four
1999	Dave Cottle	12–1			NCAA Division I Quarterfinals
2000	Dave Cottle	11–3			NCAA Division I First Round
Dave Cottle (Colonial Athletic Association) (2001–2002)
2001	Dave Cottle	10–4			NCAA Division I Quarterfinals
Dave Cottle:		181–70 (.721)			
Bill Dirrigl (Colonial Athletic Association) (2002–2003)
2002	Bill Dirrigl	9–4	5–0	1st	
Bill Dirrigl (Independent) (2003–2004)
2003	Bill Dirrigl	7–6			
2004	Bill Dirrigl	4–8			
Bill Dirrigl (ECAC Lacrosse League) (2005–2006)
2005	Bill Dirrigl	5–8	4–2	T–3rd	
Bill Dirrigl:		25–26 (.490)	9–2 (.818)		
Charley Toomey (ECAC Lacrosse League) (2006–2013)
2006	Charley Toomey	6–6	5–2	T–2nd	
2007	Charley Toomey	7–6	5–2	2nd	NCAA Division I First Round
2008	Charley Toomey	7–7	6–1	1st	NCAA Division I First Round
2009	Charley Toomey	9–5	6–1	T–1st	
2010	Charley Toomey	9–5	6–1	2nd	NCAA Division I First Round
2011	Charley Toomey	8–5	4–2	2nd	
2012	Charley Toomey	18–1	6–0	1st	NCAA Division I Champion
2013	Charley Toomey	11–5	6–1	T–1st	NCAA Division I First Round
Charley Toomey (Patriot League) (2014–Present)
2014	Charley Toomey	15–2	8–0	1st	NCAA Division I First Round
2015	Charley Toomey	7–8	5–3	4th	
2016	Charley Toomey	14–4	7–1	2nd	NCAA Division I Final Four
2017	Charley Toomey	10–6	6–2	1st	NCAA Division I First Round
2018	Charley Toomey	13–4	7–1	1st	NCAA Division I Quarterfinals
2019	Charley Toomey	12–5	7–1	1st	NCAA Division I Quarterfinals
2020	Charley Toomey	4–2	1–0	†	†
2021	Charley Toomey	10–6	4–3	2nd (South)	NCAA Division I Quarterfinals
2022	Charley Toomey	8–8	6–2	3rd	
2023	Charley Toomey	9–8	4–4	5th	
2024	Charley Toomey	7–8	5–3	6th	
2025	Charley Toomey	3–11	3–5	7th	
2026	Charley Toomey	10–6	6–2	2nd	
Charley Toomey:		197–118 (.625)	113–37 (.753)		
Total:		584–455–7 (.562)			
National champion Postseason invitational champion Conference regular season champion Conference regular season and conference tournament champion Division regular season champion Division regular season and conference tournament champion Conference tournament champion

† NCAA canceled 2020 collegiate activities due to the COVID-19 virus.

== Players ==
The Greyhounds have graduated many All-American players: 13 first team, 25 second team, 18 third team, and 68 honorable mentions. Additionally, one of the All-Americans, Pat Spencer, received both of the sport's player of the year awards, the Tewaaraton Award and Enners Award, in 2019. Many have also played professionally. There have been 23 National Lacrosse League players and 12 Major League Lacrosse players.

=== Alumni in the MLL ===
The following Loyola lacrosse players are currently or have played Major League Lacrosse.

Player	Year	Team
Matt Shearer	2001–02	Baltimore
Matt Dwan	2001–03	Baltimore
Mike Batista	2001–06	Boston
Jamie Hanford	2001–06	Bridgeport, Baltimore, New Jersey
Gewas Schindler	2003–04	Rochester
Steve Brundage	2006	Chicago
Paul Cantabene	2001–06	Baltimore
Mark Frye	2001–07	Baltimore, Washington
Tim Goettelmann	2001–10	Long Island
Dan Kallaugher	2007–09	Chicago
Tim McGeeney	2001–active	Baltimore
Gavin Prout	2001–active	Baltimore, Rochester, Toronto
Bobby Horsey	2004–active	New York, Philadelphia
Greg Leonard	2008	Washington
Paul Richards	2008–active	Washington
Shane Koppens	2009–active	Denver
P.T. Ricci	2009–active	Washington, Chesapeake, Boston
2013-2016		
