= 1990 NCAA Division I men's lacrosse tournament =

- Dates: May 1990
- Teams: 12
- Finals site: Rutgers Stadium, Piscataway, New Jersey
- Champions: Syracuse (vacated)
- Runner-up: Loyola Maryland (1st title game)
- Semifinalists: North Carolina (9th Final Four); Yale (1st Final Four)
- Winning coach: Roy Simmons Jr. (vacated) ( title)
- MOP: Gary Gait, Syracuse
- Attendance: 19,070 finals 57,418 total
- Top scorer: Gary Gait, Syracuse (23 goals)

The 1990 NCAA Division I lacrosse tournament was the 20th annual tournament hosted by the National Collegiate Athletic Association to determine the team champion of men's college lacrosse among its Division I programs, held at the end of the 1990 NCAA Division I men's lacrosse season.

Syracuse defeated Loyola Maryland in the championship game, 21–9. However, Syracuse's participation in the tournament was later vacated by the NCAA Committee on infractions because coach Roy Simmons, Jr.'s wife co-signed a car loan with Paul Gait.

The championship game was played at Rutgers Stadium at Rutgers University in Piscataway, New Jersey, with 19,070 fans in attendance.

== Overview ==
Due to the violations, Roy Simmons, Jr.'s 3–0 record. as well as Paul Gait's 7 goals and 7 assists in this tournament, are not recognized by the NCAA.

Generally considered one of the best teams in NCAA lacrosse history, the 1990 Syracuse team is notable for finishing undefeated and featuring the Gait brothers—Paul and Gary Gait—and hall-of-famer Tom Marechek.

The Orangemen won three consecutive titles from 1988 to 1990. They became the first team to win three in a row since Johns Hopkins from 1978 to 1980. The 1990 team scored more than 20 goals in 10 games this season, including 20 or more goals over the three NCAA tournament teams. Their closest game was a 15–12 win over Penn. During the Gaits' four years at Syracuse, the team went 50–5 and won three straight national titles (one of which was vacated by the NCAA).

Jon Reese had a tremendous season for Yale, leading Yale to a 15–1 regular season while scoring an NCAA record 82 goals out of the midfield. This was Yale's second only NCAA tournament appearance, where they received the second seed in the tournament. The Bulldogs ultimately making it to the Final Four.

== Bracket ==
First Round
Brown	12
8	Massachusetts	9
5	Harvard	9
Notre Dame	3
6	Virginia	6
Rutgers	7
7	Johns Hopkins	8
Princeton	9

Quarterfinals
1	Syracuse	20
Brown	12
4	North Carolina	18
5	Harvard	3
3	Loyola	19
Rutgers	10
2	Yale	17
Princeton	8

Semifinals
1	Syracuse	21
4	North Carolina	10
3	Loyola	14 *
2	Yale	13

Final
1	Syracuse	21
3	Loyola	9

- Overtime = *

== Box scores ==
=== Finals ===
Team	1	2	3	4	Total
Syracuse	3	6	5	7	21
Loyola	2	3	0	4	9
Syracuse scoring – Greg Burns 5, Gary Gait 5, Paul Gait 3, Tom Marechek 3, Joe Bonacci, Jim Egan, Rickey Cramer, Dan Caughey, Tom Gilmartin; Loyola scoring – Tony Pavlik 9; Shots: Syracuse 57, Loyola 41; Saves: Syracuse Matt Palumb 18 – Lee Hine 1, Loyola Charley Toomey 12 – Tim Dunnigan 1

=== Semifinals ===
Team	1	2	3	4	Total
Syracuse	6	7	6	2	21
North Carolina	1	2	3	4	10
Syracuse scoring – Gary Gait 5, Tom Marechek 4, Greg Burns 4, Jim Egan 2, Brook Chase 2, Rodney Dumpson, Joe Bonacci, Paul Gait, David Patane; North Carolina scoring – Mike Acee 3, Chip Mayer 2, Steve Huff 2, Joe Bedell 2, Jim Buczek; Shots: Syracuse 42, North Carolina 60; Saves: Syracuse – Matt Palumb 22, Lee Hine 3, Pat McCabe 1; North Carolina – Andy Piazza 14; Attendance: 15,154

Team	1	2	3	4	OT1	OT2	Total
Loyola Maryland	3	2	3	5	0	1	14
Yale	5	2	4	2	0	0	13
Loyola scoring – Brian Kroneberger 5, Chris Colbeck 3, Jim Blanding 2, Kevin Beach 2, 4, Jim Egan 2, Ted Nichols, Sean Quinn; Yale scoring – Jon Reese 6, Kim Dunn 4, Karl Wimer 3; Shots: Loyola 56, Yale 36; Saves: Yale – Tony Guido 19, Loyola – Charley Toomey 13; Attendance: 15,154

=== Quarterfinals ===
Team	1	2	3	4	Total
Syracuse	7	4	5	4	20
Brown	2	2	2	6	12
Syracuse scoring – Gary Gait 5, Paul Gait 3, Tom Marechek 3, Greg Burns 2, Rodney Dumpson 2, Jim Egan 2, Matt Moore, Joe Bonacci, Brook Chase; Brown scoring – Rich Touhey 3, Jay McMahon 2, Tom Dwyer 2, Andrew Towers 2, Darren Lowe, Neil Munro, Sam Jackson; Shots: Brown 62, Syracuse 51; Saves: Syracuse Matt Palumb 18, Lee Hine 3, Pat McCabe 1 – Brown Steve Ayers 10; Attendance: 11,533

Team	1	2	3	4	Total
North Carolina	3	3	7	5	18
Harvard	0	0	1	2	3
North Carolina scoring – Steve Huff 4, John Webster 3, Dennis Goldstein 3, Dan Donnelly, Chip Mayer, Jim Buczek, Donnie McNichol, Steve Speers, Andy Dunkerton, Holmes Harden, Dan Levy; Harvard scoring – Seth Handy, Don Rogers, Tim Reilly; Shots: North Carolina 60, Harvard 30; Saves: Harvard Chris Miller 13, Mike Murphy 1 – North Carolina Andy Piazza 10, Lars Pederson 2, Billy Daye 1; Attendance: 869

Team	1	2	3	4	Total
Loyola Maryland	3	5	6	5	19
Rutgers	2	2	5	1	10
Loyola scoring – Chris Colbeck 6, Jim Blanding 4, Brian Kroneberger 3, Kevin Anderson 2, Kevin; Beach 2, Todd Sloper, Ted Nichols: Rutgers scoring – M.G. Hollingsworth 2, Peter Tortorella 2, Doug Beeler 2, Scott Moore, Greg Rinaldi, Steve; Locker, John Mone: Shots: Loyola 56, Rutgers 41; Saves: Rutgers John Schmunk 17, Loyola Charlie Toomey 22, Tim Dunnigan 2; Attendance: 2,784

Team	1	2	3	4	Total
Yale	3	4	6	4	17
Princeton	0	4	1	3	8
Yale scoring – Jason O'Neill 4, Karl Wimer 4, Jon Reese 4, Kim Dunn 3, Brian Walter 2; Princeton scoring – Justin Tortolani 2, Torr Marro 2, Mark Ames, Highley Thompson, Ed Calkins, Mal Meistrell; Shots: Princeton 42, Yale 36; Saves: Yale Tony Guido 17, Chris Swanenburg 1 – Princeton Jim Ardrey 9, Mike Millner 1; Attendance: 3,540

== See also ==
- 1990 NCAA Division I women's lacrosse tournament
- 1990 NCAA Division III men's lacrosse tournament
