= 1988 NCAA Division I men's lacrosse tournament =

- Teams: 12
- Finals site: Carrier Dome, (New York (state)) Syracuse, New York
- Champions: Syracuse (2nd title)
- Runner-up: Cornell (6th title game)
- Semifinalists: Penn (1st Final Four); Virginia (9th Final Four)
- Winning coach: Roy Simmons Jr. (2nd title)
- MOP: Matt Palumb, Syracuse
- Attendance: 20,148 finals 46,141 total
- Top scorer: Gary Gait, Syracuse (18 goals)

The 1988 NCAA Division I lacrosse tournament was the 18th annual tournament hosted by the National Collegiate Athletic Association to determine the team champion of men's college lacrosse among its Division I programs, held at the end of the 1988 NCAA Division I men's lacrosse season.

Hosts Syracuse defeated Cornell in the final, 13–8, for the first of three straight NCAA titles for the Orangemen.

The championship game was played at the Carrier Dome at Syracuse University in Syracuse, New York, with 20,148 fans in attendance.

== Overview ==
Syracuse's 1988 team is noted for finishing undefeated, 15-0, and featuring the Gait brothers, Paul and Gary Gait. Syracuse was ranked number one in the nation for most of this year, averaged just under 18 goals a game, and had only one close game—an overtime win over North Carolina—during the regular season. They had also defeated the second seed in the tournament, Johns Hopkins, 19–7 early in the season.

This NCAAs is also notable for being the tournament where Gary Gait took his famous "Air Gait" shot in a close semi-final game against Tony Seaman's Penn team. Penn played a tough zone defense to try to contain the Gaits and Syracuse. Gary Gait saw a way around the zone, by running directly at the goal from behind and slam dunking the ball into the goal past the shocked goaltender. At that time, a player was allowed to both touch the goal and land in the crease, provided the ball had first crossed the goal line. Gait scored on two "Air Gait" plays in that game. The NCAA outlawed that type of play a short while later. Syracuse won this semifinal game against Penn on a goal by Paul Gait with three seconds left in the game.

In a 23–5 quarterfinal win over Navy, Gary Gait scored a tournament record 9 goals.

== Bracket ==
Regionals
Navy | 10
8 | Harvard | 9
5 | Loyola | 19
Air Force | 8
Cornell | 13
6 | Massachusetts | 11
Virginia | 10
7 | Yale | 9

Quarterfinals
1 | Syracuse | 23
Navy | 5
4 | Penn | 12
5 | Loyola | 9
3 | North Carolina | 4
Cornell | 6
2 | Johns Hopkins | 10
Virginia | 11^{(i)}

Semifinals
1 | Syracuse | 11
4 | Penn | 10
Cornell | 17
Virginia | 6

Final
1 | Syracuse | 13
Cornell | 8

- ^{(i)} one overtime

== Box scores ==
=== Finals ===
| Team | 1 | 2 | 3 | 4 | Total |
|---|---|---|---|---|---|
| Syracuse | 2 | 6 | 3 | 2 | 13 |
| Cornell | 1 | 0 | 4 | 3 | 8 |
Syracuse scoring – Greg Burns 3, Gary Gait 2, Brook Chase 2, Paul Gait 2, Jim Egan 2, Rodney Dumpson, Keith Owens; Cornell scoring – Tim Goldstein 3, John Wurzburger 2, Mike Cummings, Steve Meyer, Vince Angotti; Shots: Syracuse 50, Cornell 48; Saves: Syracuse 21, Cornell 19

=== Semifinals ===
| Team | 1 | 2 | 3 | 4 | Total |
|---|---|---|---|---|---|
| Syracuse | 1 | 2 | 6 | 2 | 11 |
| Penn | 2 | 2 | 3 | 3 | 10 |
Syracuse scoring – Gary Gait 3, John Zulberti 3, Paul Gait 2, Jim Egan 2, Greg Burns; Penn scoring – Sean Dougherty 3, Chris Flynn 2, Stewart Fisher 2, John Lyons, Peter Smith, Chris Conforti; Shots: Syracuse 46, Pennsylvania 29; Saves: Pennsylvania 20, Syracuse 15

| Team | 1 | 2 | 3 | 4 | Total |
|---|---|---|---|---|---|
| Cornell | 2 | 6 | 4 | 5 | 17 |
| Virginia | 3 | 2 | 1 | 0 | 6 |
Cornell scoring – Steve Meyer 4, Vince Angotti 3, John Wurzburger 2, Mike Cummings 2, Tony Morgan 2, John Heil, Tim Goldstein, Kevin Moran, Geoff Hall; Virginia scoring – Steve Anderson, Doug Amacher, Andy Kraus, Tom Burt, Tom Engelke, David Smith; Shots: Virginia 48, Cornell 37; Saves: Cornell 23, Virginia 15

=== Quarterfinals ===
| Team | 1 | 2 | 3 | 4 | Total |
|---|---|---|---|---|---|
| Syracuse | 7 | 2 | 5 | 9 | 23 |
| Navy | 1 | 3 | 1 | 0 | 5 |
Syracuse scoring – Gary Gait 9, Paul Gait 7, Brad Roos, John Zulberti, Rick Cramer, Keith Owens, Jim Egan, Neil Alt, James Poli; Navy scoring – Mike Herger 2, Rich Schwarz, Tim Andrews, Tom Hanzsche; Shots: Syracuse 50, Navy 20; Saves: Navy 14, Syracuse 10

| Team | 1 | 2 | 3 | 4 | Total |
|---|---|---|---|---|---|
| Penn | 4 | 4 | 1 | 3 | 12 |
| Loyola | 1 | 3 | 3 | 2 | 9 |
Penn scoring – Bob Scheetz 3, Mike Kelly 3, Stewart Fisher 2, Peter Smith 2, Sean Dougherty, Ted Nyman; Loyola Maryland scoring – Brian Kroneberger 3, Mike Ruland 2, Rusty Pritzlaff, Andy Wilson, Chris Colbeck, Brian Lutz; Shots: Penn 39, Loyola Maryland 33; Saves: Loyola 17, Penn 16

| Team | 1 | 2 | 3 | 4 | Total |
|---|---|---|---|---|---|
| Cornell | 2 | 3 | 0 | 1 | 6 |
| North Carolina | 1 | 0 | 1 | 2 | 4 |
Cornell scoring – John Wurzburger 4, Bill O’Hanlon, Tim Goldstein; North Carolina scoring – Michael Thomas, Mark Tummillo, John Szczypinski, Chris Hein; Shots: Cornell 44, North Carolina 42; Saves: Cornell 27, North Carolina 15

| Team | 1 | 2 | 3 | 4 | OT1 | Total |
|---|---|---|---|---|---|---|
| Virginia | 3 | 1 | 5 | 1 | 1 | 11 |
| Johns Hopkins | 0 | 4 | 3 | 3 | 0 | 10 |
Virginia scoring – Chase Monroe 5, Doug Amacher, Andy Kraus, Mike Smith, Chris Wakely, Tom Burt, Rob Schmalz; Johns Hopkins scoring – Matt Panetta 3, Mike Morrill 2, Pat Russell 2, Jeff Ihm, Greg Kelly, Jack Crawford; Shots: Johns Hopkins 50, Virginia 40; Saves: Virginia 26, Johns Hopkins 17

=== First round ===
| Team | 1 | 2 | 3 | 4 | Total |
|---|---|---|---|---|---|
| Navy | 3 | 4 | 0 | 3 | 10 |
| Harvard | 3 | 1 | 3 | 2 | 9 |
Navy scoring – Paul Basile 2, Mike Herger 2, John Wade 2, Tim O’Rourke, Frank Snyder, Brian Keith, Rich; Schwarz: Harvard scoring – Rob Griffith 3, Brad Raymond 2, Mickey Cavuoti 2, Neil Garfinkel, David Kramer; Shots: Harvard 48, Navy 36; Saves: Navy 19, Harvard 12

| Team | 1 | 2 | 3 | 4 | Total |
|---|---|---|---|---|---|
| Loyola | 5 | 6 | 6 | 2 | 19 |
| Air Force | 1 | 2 | 2 | 3 | 8 |
Loyola scoring – Andy Wilson 5, Rusty Pritzlaff 4, Brian Lutz 4, Mike Ruland 2, Scott Oslislo 2, Ted Nichols, Mike Heffernan; Air Force scoring – Tom Kelly 3, Tom Sexton 2, Mike Dimento 2, Jim Daronco; Shots: Loyola Maryland 51, Air Force 26; Saves: Loyola Maryland 12, Air Force 11

| Team | 1 | 2 | 3 | 4 | Total |
|---|---|---|---|---|---|
| Cornell | 2 | 3 | 4 | 4 | 13 |
| Massachusetts | 3 | 3 | 1 | 4 | 11 |
Cornell scoring – Bill O’Hanlon 5, John Wurzburger 3, Charlie Caliendo, Tim Goldstein, Vince Angotti, Paul Shea, Joe Lizzio; Massachusetts scoring – Scott Hiller 4, Kelley Carr 3, Tim Soudan 2, Paul Ganci 2; Shots: Cornell 51, Massachusetts 36; Saves: Massachusetts 18, Cornell 16

== See also ==
- List of undefeated NCAA Division I men's lacrosse national champions
- 1988 NCAA Division I women's lacrosse tournament
- 1988 NCAA Division III men's lacrosse tournament
