= 1991 NCAA Division I men's lacrosse tournament =

- Teams: 12
- Finals site: Carrier Dome, (New York (state)) Syracuse, New York
- Champions: North Carolina (4th title)
- Runner-up: Towson State (1st title game)
- Semifinalists: Maryland (13th Final Four); Syracuse (9th Final Four)
- Winning coach: Dave Klarmann (1st title)
- MOP: Dennis Goldstein, North Carolina
- Attendance: 8,293 finals 42,981 total
- Top scorers: Mark Douglas, Maryland; Glenn Smith, Towson State (16 goals)

The 1991 NCAA Division I lacrosse tournament was the 21st annual tournament hosted by the National Collegiate Athletic Association to determine the team champion of men's college lacrosse among its Division I programs, held at the end of the 1991 NCAA Division I men's lacrosse season.

North Carolina defeated Towson State in the championship game, 18–13, completing a perfect season (16-0) while also capturing the program's fourth NCAA national title.

Towson State, coached by Carl Runk, became the first unseeded team to reach the NCAA Division I lacrosse finals. The Tigers got as close as 12–11 at the start of the 4th quarter, scoring 5 straight goals. Despite these efforts, North Carolina controlled the remainder of the game, winning the national title for the first time since 1986.

The 1991 tournament championship game was played at the Carrier Dome at Syracuse University in Syracuse, New York, with 8,293 fans in attendance.

== Bracket ==
First Round
8	Loyola Maryland	20
Massachusetts	9
5	Syracuse	28
Michigan State	7
6	Virginia	13
Towson State	14
7	Maryland	13
Rutgers	7

Quarterfinals
1	North Carolina	11
8	Loyola Maryland	9
4	Johns Hopkins	8
5	Syracuse	11
3	Princeton	13
Towson State*	14
2	Brown	13
7	Maryland	16

Semifinals
1	North Carolina	19
5	Syracuse	13
Towson State	15
7	Maryland	11

Final; May 27, 1991
1	North Carolina	18
Towson State	13

- Asterisks indicate overtime periods

== Box scores ==
=== Finals ===
- May 27, 1991

Team	1	2	3	4	Total
North Carolina	8	3	1	6	18
Towson State	3	1	6	3	13
North Carolina scoring – Dennis Goldstein 4, Seremet 3, John Webster 2, Bedell 2, Dan Donnelly, Acee, Dan Levy, Donnie McNichol, Steve Speers, Wade, Thomas; Towson State scoring – Rob Shek 3, Smith 3, Blatchley 3, Sharretts 2, Dixon, Millon; Shots: UNC 59, Towson State 48; Saves: Towson State Betcher 21, UNC Piazza 9 - Daye 2

=== Semifinals ===
Team	1	2	3	4	Total
North Carolina	6	7	6	2	19
Syracuse	1	2	3	4	13
Syracuse scoring – Gary Gait 5, Tom Marechek 4, Greg Burns 4, Jim Egan 2, Brook Chase 2, Rodney Dumpson, Joe Bonacci, Paul Gait, David Patane; North Carolina scoring – Mike Acee 3, Chip Mayer 2, Steve Huff 2, Joe Bedell 2, Jim Buczek; Shots: Syracuse 42, North Carolina 60; Saves: Syracuse – Matt Palumb 22, Lee Hine 3, Pat McCabe 1; North Carolina – Andy Piazza 14; Attendance: 15,154

Team	1	2	3	4	OT1	OT2	Total
Towson State	3	2	3	5	0	1	14
Maryland	5	2	4	2	0	0	13
Loyola scoring – Brian Kroneberger 5, Chris Colbeck 3, Jim Blanding 2, Kevin Beach 2, Jim Egan 2, Ted Nichols, Sean Quinn; Yale scoring – Jon Reese 6, Kim Dunn 4, Karl Wimer 3; Shots: Loyola 56, Yale 36; Saves: Yale - Tony Guido 19, Loyola - Charley Toomey 13; Attendance: 15,154

=== Quarterfinals ===
Team	1	2	3	4	Total
North Carolina	7	4	5	4	11
Loyola Maryland	2	2	2	6	9
Syracuse scoring – Gary Gait 5, Paul Gait 3, Tom Marechek 3, Greg Burns 2, Rodney Dumpson 2, Jim Egan 2, Matt Moore, Joe Bonacci, Brook Chase; Brown scoring – Rich Touhey 3, Jay McMahon 2, Tom Dwyer 2, Andrew Towers 2, Darren Lowe, Neil Munro, Sam Jackson; Shots: Brown 62, Syracuse 51; Saves: Syracuse Matt Palumb 18, Lee Hine 3, Pat McCabe 1 - Brown Steve Ayers 10; Attendance: 11,533

Team	1	2	3	4	Total
Syracuse	3	3	7	5	11
Johns Hopkins	0	0	1	2	8
North Carolina scoring – Steve Huff 4, John Webster 3, Dennis Goldstein 3, Dan Donnelly, Chip Mayer, Jim Buczek, Donnie McNichol, Steve Speers, Andy Dunkerton, Holmes Harden, Dan Levy; Harvard scoring – Seth Handy, Don Rogers, Tim Reilly; Shots: North Carolina 60, Harvard 30; Saves: Harvard Chris Miller 13, Mike Murphy 1 -North Carolina Andy Piazza 10, Lars Pederson 2, Billy Daye 1; Attendance: 869

Team	1	2	3	4	Total
Towson State	3	3	7	5	14
Princeton	0	0	1	2	13
North Carolina scoring – Steve Huff 4, John Webster 3, Dennis Goldstein 3, Dan Donnelly, Chip Mayer, Jim Buczek, Donnie McNichol, Steve Speers, Andy Dunkerton, Holmes Harden, Dan Levy; Harvard scoring – Seth Handy, Don Rogers, Tim Reilly; Shots: North Carolina 60, Harvard 30; Saves: Harvard Chris Miller 13, Mike Murphy 1 -North Carolina Andy Piazza 10, Lars Pederson 2, Billy Daye 1; Attendance: 869

== Tournament notes ==
- Syracuse sets a new tournament record scoring 28 goals in their first round victory over Michigan State.

== See also ==
- 1991 NCAA Division I women's lacrosse tournament
- 1991 NCAA Division III men's lacrosse tournament
