= 1993 NCAA Division I men's lacrosse tournament =

- Teams: 12
- Finals site: Byrd Stadium, College Park, Maryland
- Champions: Syracuse (4th title)
- Runner-up: North Carolina (5th title game)
- Semifinalists: Johns Hopkins (19th Final Four); Princeton (2nd Final Four)
- Winning coach: Roy Simmons Jr. (5th title)
- MOP: Chris Surran, Syracuse
- Attendance: 21,129 semi-finals 19,965 finals 41,094 total
- Top scorer: John Webster, North Carolina (15 goals)

The 1993 NCAA Division I lacrosse tournament was the 23rd annual tournament hosted by the National Collegiate Athletic Association to determine the team champion of men's college lacrosse among its Division I programs, held at the end of the 1993 NCAA Division I men's lacrosse season.

Syracuse defeated North Carolina in the championship game, 13–12, with Syracuse's Matt Riter scoring the game-winner with eight seconds left. It was the Orangemen's fourth NCAA championship and eighth overall lacrosse national title.

Syracuse finished the season 12-2 even though the Tar Heels had beaten the Orangemen earlier in the season, 14–10.

The championship game was played at Byrd Stadium at the University of Maryland in College Park, Maryland, with 19,965 fans in attendance.

== Qualifying ==
Twelve NCAA Division I college men's lacrosse teams met after having played their way through a regular season, and for some, a conference tournament.

== Bracket ==
First Round
8	Army	15
Maryland	11
5	Virginia	19
Notre Dame	9
6	Hofstra	9
Massachusetts	8
Loyola Maryland	19
7	Navy	8

Quarterfinals
1	North Carolina	14
8	Army	5
4	Johns Hopkins	14
5	Virginia	10
3	Syracuse	20
6	Hofstra	8
2	Princeton	12
Loyola Maryland	6

Semifinals
1	North Carolina	16
4	Johns Hopkins	10
3	Syracuse	15
2	Princeton	9

Final
1	North Carolina	12
3	Syracuse	13

- An asterisk indicates Overtime

== Box scores ==
=== Finals ===
Team	1	2	3	4	Total
Syracuse	5	2	3	3	13
North Carolina	3	5	2	2	12
Syracuse scoring – John Barr 2, Steve Bettinger 2, Roy Colsey 2, Mark Fietta 2, Matt Riter 2, Jamie Archer, Dom Fin, Charlie Lockwood; North Carolina scoring – John Webster 3, Donnie McNichol 2, Steve Muir 2, Ryan Wade 2, Mike Acee, Steve Speers, Jason Wade: Shots: Syracuse 66, North Carolina 56; Saves: Syracuse - Chris Surran 20, North Carolina - Gary Lehrman 18; Attendance: 19,965

=== Semifinals ===
Team	1	2	3	4	Total
North Carolina	7	1	5	3	16
Johns Hopkins	2	4	4	4	10
North Carolina scoring – Steve Speers 4, John Webster 3, Dan Levy 2, Ryan Wade 2, Mike Acee, Judy; Collins, Ousmane Greene, Steve Muir, Mark Phillips: Johns Hopkins scoring – Brian Kelly 3, Milford Marchant 3, Dave Marr, Brian Piccola, Terry Riordan, Steve; Vecchione: Shots: North Carolina 62, Johns Hopkins 34; Saves: Johns Hopkins – Jonathan Marcus 17, North Carolina – Gary Lehrman 14; Attendance: 21,129

Team	1	2	3	4	Total
Syracuse	3	3	5	4	15
Princeton	2	1	2	4	9
Syracuse scoring – Jamie Archer 2, John Barr 2, Roy Colsey 2, Mark Fietta 2, Dom Fin 2, Charlie Lockwood; 2, Steve Bettinger, Matt Riter, Chad Smith: Princeton scoring – Jason Buttles 2, Torr Marro 2, Scott Reinhardt 2, Todd Higgins, Taylor Simmers, Brian; Tomeo: Shots: Syracuse 55, Princeton 37; Saves: Princeton Scott Bacigalupo 17, Syracuse Chris Surran 15; Attendance: 21,129

=== Quarterfinals ===
Team	1	2	3	4	Total
North Carolina	1	4	4	5	14
Army	2	0	3	0	5
North Carolina scoring – John Webster 3, Ousmane Greene 2, Dan Levy 2, T.J. Shimaitis 2, Ryan Wade 2, Kyle Durkee, Steve Schattner, Jason Sanders: Army scoring – Chad Allen, Steve Heller, Tim Keneally, Phil Mandry, Eric Waltz; Shots: North Carolina 54, Army 29; Saves: Army Rick Aguilar 19 - North Carolina Gary Lehrman 11; Attendance: 1,756

Team	1	2	3	4	Total
Johns Hopkins	2	3	2	7	14
Virginia	3	2	5	0	10
Johns Hopkins scoring – Terry Riordan 4, Brian Piccola 3, Todd Cavallaro 2, Brian Kelly 2, David Townsend; 2, Alex Wadkovsky: Virginia scoring – Chris Driggs 3, Ray Kamrath 2, Rob Falk, Drew Fox, Tony Nugent, Greg Traynor, Tim; Whiteley: Shots: Johns Hopkins 42, Virginia 37; Saves: Johns Hopkins Jonathan Marcus 10 - Virginia James Ireland 7; Attendance: 5,222

Team	1	2	3	4	Total
Syracuse	6	6	3	5	20
Hofstra	1	1	1	5	8
Syracuse scoring – Matt Riter 7, Steve Bettinger 2, Andy Puccia 2, Jamie Archer, John Barr, Roy Colsey, Casey Donegan, Mark Fietta, Dom Fin, Erik Knaus, Charlie Lockwood, Jim Morrisey: Hofstra scoring – Kevin Barry 2, Dom DiNardo 2, Andy Carlson, Kevin Jacobs, Brian Holland, Chris Panos; Shots: Syracuse 65, Hofstra 34; Saves: Hofstra Joe Romeo 15, Kevin Johnson 2 - Syracuse Chris Surran 13; Attendance: 4,395

Team	1	2	3	4	Total
Princeton	5	2	2	3	12
Loyola Maryland	0	0	3	3	6
Princeton scoring – Kevin Lowe 3, Taylor Simmers 2, John Burstein, Scott Conklin, Torr Marro, Donn; McDonough, Paul Murphy, Scott Reinhardt, Brian Tomeo: Loyola Maryland scoring – Kevin Beach 2, Andy Martin 2, Kevin Anderson, Brian Duffy; Shots: Loyola Maryland 34, Princeton 33; Saves: Princeton Scott Bacigalupo 12 - Loyola Maryland Tim McGeeney 11; Attendance: 4,155

=== First round ===
Team	1	2	3	4	Total
Army	2	6	3	4	15
Maryland	5	0	1	5	11
Army scoring – Dan Brostek 4, Chad Allen 2, Todd Butler 2, Steve Heller 2, Phil Mandry 2, Mike Colon, Brian Knapp, Eric Waltz: Maryland scoring – Brian McElheny 3, Matt Parks 2, Jay Pasko 2, Bob Huggins, Scott McMahon, Greg Nelin, Dan Reading: Shots: Maryland 46, Army 42; Saves: Maryland Brian Dougherty 20 - Army Rick Aguilar; Attendance: 4,121

Team	1	2	3	4	Total
Virginia	7	5	3	4	19
Notre Dame	0	2	4	3	9
Virginia scoring – Kevin Pehlke 4, Tim Whiteley 4, Ray Kamrath 3, Greg Traynor 3, Mark Dixon, Chris; Driggs, Rob Falk, Drew Fox, Joe Wilson: Notre Dame scoring – Randy Colley 3, Willie Sutton 2, Brian Erickson, Mike Iorio, Kevin Mahoney, Robbie; Snyder: Shots: Virginia 52, Notre Dame 36; Saves: Virginia James Ireland 11 - Notre Dame Patrick Finn 9, Chris Parent 5, Ryan Jewell 2; Attendance: 1,275

Team	1	2	3	4	Total
Hofstra	3	4	4	4	9
Massachusetts	0	0	4	3	8
Hofstra scoring – Dave Donatello 3, Michael Adams, Kevin Barry, Kevin Baudo, Dom DiNardo, Kevin; Jacobs, Mike Ricigliano: Massachusetts scoring – Bill Edell 3, Mark Millon 2, Eric Bailey 2, Eric Triolo; Shots: Hofstra 43, Massachusetts 29; Saves: Massachusetts Tom LoPresti 14 - Hofstra Joe Romeo 13; Attendance: 4,281

Team	1	2	3	4	Total
Loyola Marymount	3	5	8	3	19
Navy	1	1	6	0	8
Loyola Maryland scoring – Kevin Beach 6, Kevin Anderson 3, Pat Ervin 2, Sean Heffernan 2, Andy Martin 2, Paul Cantabene, Del Halladay, Mark O'Brien, Derek Radebaugh: Navy scoring – Jamie Slough 4, John Tierney 2, Rob Bailey, Tommy Rozko; Shots: Loyola Maryland 55, Navy 39; Saves: Navy Kevin Farrington 17 - Loyola Maryland Tim McGeeney 9, Paul Speargas 1; Attendance: 5,428

== All-Tournament Team ==
- Chris Surran, Syracuse (Named the tournament's Most Outstanding Player)

=== Leading scorers ===
Leading scorers	GP	G	A	Pts
John Webster, North Carolina	3	9	6	15
Matt Riter, Syracuse	3	10	3	13
Charlie Lockwood, Syracuse	3	4	7	11
Tim Whiteley, Virginia	2	5	5	10
Brian Piccola, Johns Hopkins	2	4	5	9
Jamie Archer, Syracuse	3	4	3	7
John Barr, Syracuse	3	5	2	7
Kevin Lowe, Princeton	2	3	4	7
Steve Speers, Syracuse	3	5	2	7
Ryan Wade, North Carolina	3	6	1	7

== See also ==
- 1993 NCAA Division I women's lacrosse tournament
- 1993 NCAA Division II lacrosse tournament
- 1993 NCAA Division III men's lacrosse tournament
