= Charley Toomey =

American lacrosse coach

Current position
- Title: Head coach
- Team: Loyola (MD)

Playing career
- 1987–1990: Loyola
- 1992: Baltimore Thunder
- 1993: Boston Blazers
- Position: Goalkeeper

Coaching career (HC unless noted)
- 1991–1992: Loyola (assistant)
- 1993: NAPS
- 1994–1995: Navy (assistant)
- 1996–1998: Severn School
- 1999–2005: Loyola (assistant)
- 2006–present: Loyola

Head coaching record
- Overall: 170–85 (.667)

Accomplishments and honors

Championships
- 2012 NCAA Division I national championship

Awards
- As player: Third team USILA All-American 1990; Honorable mention USILA All-American 1989; As coach: 2012 F. Morris Touchstone Award

Charley Toomey is an American lacrosse coach and former player. He is currently the head coach for the Loyola Greyhounds men's lacrosse team at Loyola University Maryland.

== Playing career ==
A native of Arnold, Maryland, Toomey initially attended Martin Spalding High School before reclassifying and playing a fifth prep year at the Boys' Latin School of Maryland.

Toomey played college lacrosse for Loyola as a goalkeeper and helped bring them to the school's first NCAA final in 1990. He also played professionally for both the Baltimore Thunder and the original Boston Blazers, although he only played in three games during the two years he played.

== Coaching career ==
Toomey was hired to at his alma mater, Loyola, as head coach on December 21, 2005. As head coach of the Greyhounds, he led the team to win the NCAA Division I lacrosse championship on May 28, 2012, completing the year with an 18 and 1 record. The team's one loss was to Johns Hopkins. Toomey was named the 2012 winner of the F. Morris Touchstone Award as the Division I Coach of the Year.

On April 6, 2024, Toomey earned his 182nd victory, surpassing his former head coach Dave Cottle to become the winningest coach in Loyola lacrosse history.

== See also ==
- Loyola Greyhounds men's lacrosse

== Awards ==
| Preceded by Dom Starsia | F. Morris Touchstone Award; 2012 | Succeeded by John Danowski |
