= 2012 NCAA Division I men's lacrosse tournament =

- Dates: May 12–28, 2012
- Teams: 16
- Finals site: Gillette Stadium, Foxborough, Massachusetts
- Champions: Loyola (1st title)
- Runner-up: Maryland (11th title game)
- Semifinalists: Duke (8th Final Four); Notre Dame (3rd Final Four)
- Winning coach: Charley Toomey (Loyola title)
- MOP: Eric Lusby, Loyola
- Attendance: 31,774 semi-finals 30,816 finals 62,590 total
- Top scorer: Eric Lusby, Loyola (17 goals)

The 2012 NCAA Division I lacrosse tournament was the 42nd annual tournament hosted by the National Collegiate Athletic Association to determine the team champion of men's college lacrosse among its Division I programs, held at the end of the 2012 NCAA Division I men's lacrosse season. The tournament was played from May 12–28, 2012.

Loyola won their first ever NCAA lacrosse title, defeating unseeded Maryland, 9–3. Despite beginning the season unranked, the Greyhounds became the ninth school to win an NCAA Division I Men's Lacrosse championship since tournament play began in 1971. Loyola won 12 straight games to start the season before losing their only game, an overtime loss to Johns Hopkins. The Greyhounds' Eric Lusby set a then-tournament record for goals with 17.

The championship game was played at Gillette Stadium, the home of the NFL's New England Patriots, in Foxborough, Massachusetts, with 41,935 fans in attendance.

The United States Naval Academy hosted two quarterfinal matches on May 19 at Navy-Marine Corps Memorial Stadium in Annapolis, Maryland. Drexel University hosted the other two quarterfinal matches on May 20 at PPL Park in Chester, Pennsylvania.

== Qualifying ==
Sixteen teams were selected to compete in the tournament based upon their performance during the regular season, and for some, by means of a conference tournament automatic qualifier.

Canisius (MAAC), Lehigh (Patriot League), Loyola (ECAC), Massachusetts (CAA), Stony Brook (America East), Syracuse (Big East), and Yale (Ivy League), earned an automatic bid into the tournament by winning their respective conference tournaments. During the tournament, the Colgate Raiders won their first ever NCAA Tournament game, defeating Massachusetts by a score of 13–11.

== Bracket ==
First Round; May 12–13
1 | Loyola Maryland | 17
Canisius | 5
8 | North Carolina | 14
Denver | 16
4 | Notre Dame | 13
Yale | 7
5 | Virginia | 6
Princeton | 5
3 | Duke | 12
Syracuse | 9
6 | Massachusetts | 11
Colgate | 13
7 | Lehigh | 9
Maryland | 10
2 | Johns Hopkins | 19
Stony Brook | 9

Quarterfinals; May 19–20
1 | Loyola Maryland | 10
Denver | 9
4 | Notre Dame | 12
5 | Virginia | 10
3 | Duke | 17
Colgate | 6
Maryland | 11
2 | Johns Hopkins | 5

Semifinals; May 26
1 | Loyola Maryland | 7
4 | Notre Dame | 5
3 | Duke | 10
Maryland | 16

Final; May 28
1 | Loyola Maryland | 9
Maryland | 3

- * = Overtime
- † = Double Overtime
- ‡ = Triple Overtime

== Box scores ==
=== Finals ===
==== #1 Loyola Maryland vs. Maryland ====
| Team | 1 | 2 | 3 | 4 | Total |
|---|---|---|---|---|---|
| Loyola | 2 | 3 | 1 | 3 | 9 |
| Maryland | 1 | 2 | 0 | 0 | 3 |
Loyola scoring – Eric Lusby 4, Mike Sawyer, Pat Byrnes, Davis Butts, Justin Ward, Phil Dobson; Maryland scoring – Mike Chanenchuk, Jesse Bernhardt, Kevin Cooper; Shots: Loyola 32, Maryland 29; Saves: Maryland 8, Loyola 7

=== Semifinals ===
==== #1 Loyola Maryland vs. #4 Notre Dame ====
| Team | 1 | 2 | 3 | 4 | Total |
|---|---|---|---|---|---|
| Loyola | 2 | 3 | 2 | 0 | 7 |
| Notre Dame | 1 | 2 | 0 | 2 | 5 |
Loyola scoring – Eric Lusby 5, Josh Hawkins, Davis Butts; Notre Dame scoring – Westy Hopkins 2, Nicholas Beattie, Sean Rogers, Jim Marlatt; Shots: Loyola 28, Notre Dame 28; Saves: Loyola 15, Notre Dame 13

==== #3 Duke vs. Maryland ====
| Team | 1 | 2 | 3 | 4 | Total |
|---|---|---|---|---|---|
| Maryland | 3 | 4 | 3 | 6 | 16 |
| Duke | 2 | 2 | 3 | 3 | 10 |
Maryland scoring - Drew Snider 4, Owen Blye 3, Billy Gribbin 2, Kevin Forster 2, Kevin Cooper, Joe Cummings, John Haus, Mike Chanenchuk, Sean McGuire; Duke scoring – Justin Turri 2, Robert Rotanz 2, Josh Dionne, Christian Walsh, CJ Costabile, Josh Offit, Eddie Loftus, Andrew Vekstein; Shots: Duke 32, Maryland 29; Shots: Maryland 10, Duke 7; Attendance: 31,774

=== Quarterfinals ===
==== #1 Loyola Maryland vs. #8 Denver ====
| Team | 1 | 2 | 3 | 4 | Total |
|---|---|---|---|---|---|
| Loyola | 2 | 4 | 3 | 1 | 10 |
| Denver | 2 | 2 | 2 | 3 | 9 |
Loyola scoring – Eric Lusby 5, Josh Hawkins, Davis Butts; Denver scoring – Rob Guida 3, Holden Cattoni 3, Connor Reed, Wells Stanwick, Ryan Brown, Brandon Benn, John Crawley; Shots: Loyola 44, Denver 35; Saves: Loyola 44, Denver 35

=== First round ===
==== #1 Loyola Maryland vs. Canisius ====
| Team | 1 | 2 | 3 | 4 | Total |
|---|---|---|---|---|---|
| Loyola | 4 | 4 | 5 | 4 | 17 |
| Canisius | 3 | 4 | 3 | 6 | 16 |
Loyola scoring – Mike Sawyer 6, Eric Lusby 3, Davis Butts 2, Scott Ratliff 2, Chris Layne, Pat Byrnes, Tyler Foley, Will Fredericks; Canisius scoring – Jimmy Haney 5, Nick Caldiero 2, Joe Rautenstrauch 2, Justin Maderer, Brandon Bull, Travis Gibbons, Jonathan Domres, Simon Giourmetakis, Tim Edwards; Shots: Loyola 47, Canisius 22; Shots: Canisius 12, Loyola 2

==== #8 Denver vs. North Carolina ====
| Team | 1 | 2 | 3 | 4 | Total |
|---|---|---|---|---|---|
| Denver | 2 | 2 | 1 | 5 | 9 |
| North Carolina | 1 | 0 | 0 | 0 | 5 |
Denver scoring – Erik Adamson 2, Zach Miller 2, Jeremy Noble, Jack Bobzein, Wesley Berg, Dallas Bridle, Sean Cannizzarro; North Carolina scoring – Thomas Dour; Shots: Denver 41, North Carolina 16

== All-tournament team ==
- Eric Lusby, A, Loyola (Most Outstanding Player)
- Josh Hawkins, M, Loyola
- Joe Fletcher, D, Loyola
- Scott Ratliff, LSM, Loyola
- Jack Runkel, G, Loyola
- Joe Cummings, A, Maryland
- Drew Snider, M, Maryland
- Jesse Bernhardt, D, Maryland
- Brendan J.R. Murphy, D, Canisius
- C.J. Costabile, LSM, Duke
- John Kemp, G, Notre Dame

== Leading scorers ==
Leading Scorers
| Name | GP | G | A | Pts |
|---|---|---|---|---|
| Eric Lusby, Loyola | 4 | 17 | 5 | 22 |
| Jeremy Noble, Denver | 2 | 5 | 8 | 13 |
| Justin Turri, Duke | 3 | 6 | 6 | 12 |
| Robert Rotanz, Duke | 3 | 10 | 1 | 11 |
| Steele Stanwick, Virginia | 2 | 3 | 6 | 9 |
| Jay Jalbert, Virginia | 3 | 8 | 4 | 12 |
| Tucker Radebaugh, Virginia | 3 | 7 | 5 | 12 |
| Drew McKnight, Virginia | 3 | 6 | 5 | 11 |
| Dan Denihan, Johns Hopkins | 2 | 9 | 2 | 11 |
| Mike Henehan, Georgetown | 3 | 7 | 4 | 11 |
| Greg McCavera, Georgetown | 3 | 6 | 5 | 11 |

== See also ==
- 2012 NCAA Division I women's lacrosse tournament
- 2012 NCAA Division II men's lacrosse tournament
- 2012 NCAA Division III men's lacrosse tournament
