= 1977 NCAA Division I lacrosse tournament =

1977 NCAA Division I men's lacrosse tournament
- Dates: May 18–28, 1977
- Teams: 8
- Finals site: Scott Stadium; Charlottesville, Virginia
- Champions: Cornell (3rd title)
- Runner-up: Johns Hopkins (4th title game)
- Semifinalists: Maryland (7th Final Four); Navy (4th Final Four)
- Winning coach: Richie Moran (3rd title)
- MOP: Eamon McEneaney, Cornell
- Attendance: 10,080 finals 29,193 total
- Top scorer: Eamon McEneaney, Cornell (25 goals)

The 1977 NCAA Division I lacrosse tournament was the seventh annual tournament hosted by the National Collegiate Athletic Association to determine the team champion of men's college lacrosse among its Division I programs at the end of the 1977 NCAA Division I lacrosse season.

Cornell capped off a 13-0 season with its second-straight NCAA championship, defeating Johns Hopkins in the final, 16–8. Cornell completed a second undefeated season, becoming the first team to win back-to-back championships.

The championship game was played at Scott Stadium at the University of Virginia in Charlottesville, Virginia, with 10,080 fans in attendance.

== Overview ==
Led for the second straight year by Coach Richard M. Moran and USILA most outstanding player winner Eamon McEneaney, Cornell capped off a 13–0 season with a 16–8 victory over Johns Hopkins in the finals. McEneaney scored three goals and assisted on five others, while Hall of Famer Dan Mackesey was a solid in goal with 14 saves. Cornell opened with an 9–0 lead in the first 20 minutes and led by as many as 13–1 early in the second half of the finals.

The victory was the 29th straight for Cornell and marked their third title in seven NCAA tournaments. Cornell would not lose again until the following year's championship game again versus Johns Hopkins. Both of Hopkins' losses during the season were to Cornell, and McEneaney had 25 total points during the tournament eclipsing the prior record of 20 set by Mike French in 1976.

Coach Moran earned his second Morris Touchstone Award as the Division I Coach of the Year, while Eamon McEneaney won the Lt. Raymond Enners Award as the most outstanding player in the nation and Chris Kane wins the Schmeisser Cup as the nation's outstanding defenseman. Dan Mackesey repeated as the winner of the Ens. C.M. Kelly, Jr. Award as the nation's most outstanding goaltender, making it the fifth time in a 10-year span that a Big Red player had received the award.

Eamon McEneaney was voted the outstanding player in the 1977 NCAA tournament and also represented the United States in the 1978 World Lacrosse Championships. He was inducted into the Cornell Sports Hall of Fame in 1982. McEneaney was inducted into the National Lacrosse Hall of Fame in 1992. McEneaney teamed with Hall of Fame players Mike French, Dan Mackesey, Bill Marino, Bob Hendrickson, and Chris Kane, and coach Richie Moran to lead the Cornell Big Red to the NCAA Men's Lacrosse Championship in 1976 and 1977. His top season was 1975 when he scored 31 goals and handed out 65 assists for 96 total points in 17 games, and was named the USILA player of the year. That year, he was also awarded the Turnbull Award given to the top collegiate attackman. His career was played in an era when freshmen were not eligible to play varsity sports. He was also an outstanding football player, playing wide receiver. He was named to the All-Ivy second team in 1976, when he led Cornell in receiving and was second in team scoring. In 1995, he was named to the NCAA's Silver Anniversary Lacrosse Team, recognizing his place among the best players of the first quarter century of NCAA lacrosse. McEneaney was a 9-11 victim and his jersey number (#10) was retired by Cornell University on April 27, 2002 in memoriam.

== Bracket ==
Quarterfinals; May 18
1	Cornell	17
8	Massachusetts	13
5	Navy	14
4	Penn	12
3	Maryland	14
6	Washington & Lee	8
2	Johns Hopkins	16
7	North Carolina	9

Semifinals; May 21
1	Cornell	22
5	Navy	6
3	Maryland	12
2	Johns Hopkins	22

Championship; May 28
1	Cornell (13–0)	16
2	Johns Hopkins (11–2)	8

== Box scores ==
=== Finals ===
Team	1	2	3	4	Total
Cornell (13–0)	5	5	4	2	16
Johns Hopkins (11–2)	0	1	2	5	8
Cornell scoring – Eamon McEneaney 3, Tom Marino 3, Steve Page 2, John Sierra 2, Craig Jaeger, Reilly McDonald, Bob Mathisen, Keith Reitenbach, George Lau, Gary Malm; Johns Hopkins scoring – Frank Cutrone, Scott Baugher, Rich Hirsch, Steve Wey, Dave Huntley, Mike O’Neill, Joe Devlin, Tom Myrick; Shots: Johns Hopkins 46, Cornell 36; Saves: Cornell 17, Johns Hopkins 8

=== Semifinals ===
Team	1	2	3	4	Total
Cornell	9	4	5	4	22
Navy	1	1	1	3	6
Cornell scoring – Tom Marino 6, Eamon McEneaney 5, Bob Henrickson 2, Craig Jaeger 2, Steve Page, John Sierra, Keith Reitenbach, Joe Szombathy, Ned Gerber, Joe Taylor, Chuck Wieb; Navy scoring – Bill Stulb 2, Jeff Long, Mike Hannan, Mike Chanenchuk, Brendan Schneck; Shots: Cornell 57, Navy 25

Team	1	2	3	4	Total
Johns Hopkins	8	4	5	5	22
Maryland	3	2	2	5	12
Johns Hopkins scoring – Dave Huntley 4, Bob DeSimone 4, Mike O’Neill 2, Wayne Davis 2, Rich Hirsch 2, George Johnson 2, Frank Cutrone 2, Tom Myrick, Joe Swerdloff, Scott Baugher, Phil Federico; Maryland scoring – Mike Hynes 4, Ron Martinello 2, Lance Kohler 2, Greg Rumpf, Bob Ott, Mark Shores, Pete Worstell; Shots: Johns Hopkins 54, Maryland 45

=== First Round ===
Team	1	2	3	4	Total
Cornell	6	2	6	3	17
Massachusetts	5	3	2	3	13
Cornell scoring – Eamon McEneaney 3, Tom Marino 3, Bob Henrickson 3, Steve Page 3, Craig Jaeger, Dave Bray, Joe Szombathy, Keith Reitenbach, Reiley McDonald; Massachusetts scoring – Jeff Spooner 2, Norm Smith 2, Steve Pappas, 2, Kevin Patterson, Terry Keefe, Vinnie Lobello, Chuck Smith, Randy Krutzler, John Reardon, Mickey Menna; Shots: Cornell 61, Massachusetts 42

Team	1	2	3	4	Total
Navy	2	5	2	5	14
Pennsylvania	3	2	4	3	12
Navy scoring – Brendan Schneck 4, Bob Holman 4, Jeff Long 2, Mike Chanenchuk, Mike Hannan, Ernie Styron, Skip Wagner; Pennsylvania scoring – Mike Page 5, Peter Hollis 4, Tim Dachille 2, Kevin Dachille; Shots: Pennsylvania 33, Navy 20

Team	1	2	3	4	Total
Johns Hopkins	6	2	3	5	16
North Carolina	3	1	2	3	9
Johns Hopkins scoring – Mike O’Neill 4, Joe Swerdloff 3, Scott Baugher 2, Bob Teasdall, Dave Huntley, Tom Myrick, Bob DeSimone, Steve Wey, Frank Cutrone, Doober Aburn; North Carolina scoring – Joe Yevoli 3, Larry Turkheimer 2, Bruce Matthai, Dan Cox, Paul Worstell, Bob Volker; Shots: Johns Hopkins 77, North Carolina 34

Team	1	2	3	4	Total
Maryland	4	2	4	4	14
Washington and Lee	1	1	4	2	8
Maryland scoring – Kevin Boland 3, Bert Olsen 3, Pete Worstell 2, Greg Rumpf, Lance Kohler, Terry Kimball, Mark Shores, Andy Tyrie, Nick Mannis; Wash. & Lee scoring – Jay Sindler 2, Doug Fuge 2, Chris Kearney 2, Jeff Frita, Jack Dudley; Shots: Maryland 63, Wash. & Lee 51

== Outstanding players ==
- Eamon McEneaney, Cornell

=== Leading scorers ===
Name	GP	G	A	Pts
Eamon McEneaney, Cornell	3	11	14	25
Mike O’Neill, Johns Hopkins	3	7	8	15
Tom Marino, Cornell	3	12	2	14
Rich Hirsch, Johns Hopkins	3	3	8	11
Brendan Schneck, Navy	2	5	5	10
Mike Hynes, Maryland	3	4	5	9
Steve Page, Cornell	3	6	2	8
Bob Henrickson, Cornell	3	5	3	8
Mike Page, Pennsylvania	1	5	2	7
Peter Hollis, Pennsylvania	1	4	3	7
Bob DeSimone, Johns Hopkins	3	5	2	7

== Notes ==
- Cornell the national champion scores 55 total goals, a new tournament record

== See also ==
- 1977 NCAA Division II lacrosse tournament
- Undefeated National Champions
