= 1976 NCAA Division I lacrosse tournament =

1976 NCAA Division I men's lacrosse tournament
- Dates: May 19–29, 1976
- Teams: 8
- Finals site: Brown Stadium, Providence, Rhode Island
- Champions: Cornell (2nd title)
- Runner-up: Maryland (6th title game)
- Semifinalists: Johns Hopkins (4th Final Four); Navy (3rd Final Four)
- Winning coach: Richie Moran (2nd title)
- Attendance: 11,954 finals 20,819 total
- Top scorer: Mike French, Cornell (20 goals)

The 1976 NCAA Division I lacrosse tournament was the sixth annual tournament hosted by the National Collegiate Athletic Association to determine the team champion of men's college lacrosse among its Division I programs at the end of the 1976 NCAA Division I lacrosse season.

Undefeated Cornell—led by coach Richie Moran and players Mike French and Eamon McEneaney—defeated Maryland in the championship game, 16–13 after one overtime.

The tournament championship game was played at Brown Stadium at Brown University in Providence, Rhode Island.

== Overview ==
Throughout the 1970s Cornell University was dominant in lacrosse with four national championship appearances to go with three titles. The 1976 and 1977 Big Red teams are generally considered to be among the best of all time.

The Big Red's 1976 NCAA championship team featured Hall of Fame players, Eamon McEneaney, Mike French, Bob Henrickson, Bill Marino, Dan Mackesey, and Chris Kane, as well as Hall of Fame coaches, Richie Moran and Michael Waldvogel.

In the matchup that lacrosse fans wanted to see, for the first time in NCAA tournament history two undefeated teams, #1 Maryland and #2 Cornell met in the championship game. The game did not disappoint, as Cornell, down 7–2 at halftime, outscored Maryland 6–2 in the third period to pull within one goal entering the final period. The Terps opened the fourth period with a goal to go up 10–8, but the next four goals belonged to Cornell who led 12–10 with three minutes to play. Maryland, however, would not back down and got back-to-back goals including a buzzer-beater to knot the game and send the contest into overtime.

This tournament finals was not a sudden death, first goal to win the game. This overtime consisted of one OT with two four minute periods, with the teams swapping ends between periods. After an initial goal by Maryland's Terry Kimball, Cornell would score four unanswered goals to claim the crown with a 16 to 13 victory.

Cornell earlier in the tournament recorded the only shutout in NCAA tournament history when they blanked Washington and Lee 14–0 in the first round. In a game that featured both snow and pouring rain, the Big Red did the improbable with goalie Dan Mackesey pitching a shutout making 13 saves. The number 7 seed Generals, who had been national semifinalists the previous year, had an impressive offensive unit coming into the contest having outscored its regular season opponents 147 to 89.

In a 22-11 semifinal win against Navy, Maryland's Ed Mullen had 7 goals and 5 assists to set a tournament record of 12 total points in one game.

In the finals, Mike French tied the then-NCAA tournament single-game scoring record, finishing the day with seven goals and four assists, while Dan Mackesey matched the then-tournament record for saves in a single-game with 28 stops.

== Bracket ==
Quarterfinals; May 19
1	Maryland	17
8	Brown	8
4	Navy	13
5	North Carolina	9
3	Johns Hopkins	11
6	Massachusetts	9
2	Cornell	14
7	Washington and Lee	0

Semifinals; May 22
1	Maryland	22
4	Navy	11
2	Cornell	13
3	Johns Hopkins	5

Championship; May 29
1	Maryland (10–1)	13
2	Cornell (16–0)	16^{(i)}

- ^{(i)} one overtime

== Box scores ==
=== Finals ===
Team	1	2	3	4	OT	Total
Cornell (16–0)	1	1	6	4	4	16
Maryland (10–1)	1	6	2	3	1	13
Cornell scoring – Mike French 7, Jon Levine 4, Bill Marino 2, Steve Dybus, Gary Malm, Bob Henrickson; Maryland scoring – Frank Urso 2, John Lamon 2, Ed Mullen 2, Barry Mitchell, Lance Kohler, Bert Caswell, Bert Olsen, Jim Burnett, Greg Rumpf, Terry Kimball; Shots: Maryland 58, Cornell 43; Saves: Cornell Dan Mackesey 28, Maryland Jake Reed 15 - Andre Pantelides 0; Location: Providence, RI (Brown Stadium) - 5/29/1976; Attendance: 11,954

=== Semifinals ===
Team	1	2	3	4	Total
Cornell	2	2	4	5	13
Johns Hopkins	0	0	1	4	5
Cornell scoring – Jon Levine 5, Bill Marino 3, Mike French 2, Albin Haglund 2, Tom Marino; Johns Hopkins scoring – Dave Huntley 2, Tom Myrick, Joe Garavente, Rich Hirsch; Shots: Cornell 39, Johns Hopkins 23; Saves: Cornell Dan Mackesey 7, Johns Hopkins Mahon 12 - Trainor 1; Location: Ithaca, NY (Schoellkopf Field) - 5/22/1976; Attendance: 7,000

Team	1	2	3	4	Total
Maryland	10	3	5	4	22
Navy	1	3	3	4	11
Maryland scoring – Ed Mullen 7, Roger Tuck 4, Bert Caswell 3, Bob Ott 2, Frank Urso, Jim Burnett, John Lamon, Mike Farrell, Lance Kohler, Terry Kimball; Navy scoring – Mike Canders 4, Bob Holman 2, George Moore 2, Jeff Connolly, Jim Shulson, Emory Chenoweth; Shots: Maryland 58, Navy 49; Saves: Maryland Jake Reed 12 - Pantelides 3, Navy Bill Mueller 17 - Johnson 3; Location: College Park, Maryland (Byrd Stadium) - 5/23/1976; Attendance: 12,000

=== Quarterfinals ===
Team	1	2	3	4	Total
Maryland	3	8	4	2	17
Brown	0	2	3	3	8
Maryland scoring – Frank Urso 3, Bert Caswell 3, Lance Kohler 2, Ed Mullen 2, Roger Tuck 2, Terry Kimball 2, Bert Olsen, Bob Ott, Mark Shores; Brown scoring – Peter Bensley 3, Bob MacLeod 3, Steve Meister, Bill Ohlsen; Shots: Maryland 43, Brown 34; Saves: Maryland Jake Reed 14 - Pantelides 2, Brown Aburn 15 - Fitzpatrick 1; Location: College Park, Maryland (Byrd Stadium) - 5/19/1976; Attendance: 850

Team	1	2	3	4	Total
Navy	4	2	2	5	13
North Carolina	1	3	3	2	9
Navy scoring – Skip Miller 3, Bill Claridge 2, Jeff Long 2, Emory Chenoweth, Mike Chanenchuk, Chris Burgin, Bill Stulb, Bob Holman, Mike Canders; North Carolina scoring – Dan Cox 2, Steve Sartorio, Paul Worstell, Bill MacGowan, Martin Sutton, Tom Venier, Larry Turheimer, Doug Fierro; Shots: Navy 43, North Carolina 34; Saves: Navy Bill Mueller 11 - Johnson 1 - Sobotka 1, North Carolina Chuck Weinstein 15 - Jack Manley 2; Location: Annapolis, Maryland (Navy–Marine Corps Memorial Stadium) - 5/19/1976; Attendance: 1,000

Team	1	2	3	4	Total
Johns Hopkins	2	6	0	3	11
Massachusetts	5	0	3	1	9
Johns Hopkins scoring – Mike O’Neill 4, Rich Hirsch 2, Franz Wittlesburger 2, Tom Myrick, George Johnson, Phil Garavente, Dale Kohler; Massachusetts scoring – Fred Menna 5, Jeff Spooner 2, Andy Scheffer, Paul Martin; Shots: Johns Hopkins 43, Massachusetts 34; Saves: Johns Hopkins Mahon 10, Massachusetts Don Goldstein 15; Location: Baltimore, Maryland (Homewood Field) - 5/19/1976; Attendance:

Team	1	2	3	4	Total
Cornell	5	3	1	5	14
Washington and Lee	0	0	0	0	0
Cornell scoring – Robert Mitchell 3, Tom Marino 2, Bob Hendrickson, Mike French, Jon Levine, Eamon McEneaney, Dave Bray, John O’Neill, Albin Haglund, Steve Dybus, Keith Reitenbach, Brian Lasda, John Britton.; Washington and Lee scoring –; Shots: Cornell 39, Washington and Lee 20; Saves: Cornell Dan Mackesey 13, Washington and Lee Charlie Brown 18; Location: Ithaca, NY (Schoellkopf Field) - 5/19/1976; Attendance:

== Outstanding players ==
The NCAA did not designate a Most Outstanding Player until the 1977 national tournament.

== Notes ==
- Cornell's 14–0 victory over Washington and Lee was the first shutout in the tournament's history
- First meeting of undefeated teams in NCAA finals

== See also ==
- 1976 NCAA Division II lacrosse tournament
- Undefeated NCAA Division I men's lacrosse tournament champions
