= Mike French =

Canadian lacrosse player (born 1953)

Personal information
- Nationality: Canadian
- Born: May 13, 1953 (age 73)

Sport
- Position: Attack/Forward
- Coached by: Philadelphia Wings, 1994
- NLL teams: Philadelphia Wings
- Former NCAA team: Cornell University
- Pro career: 1987

Career highlights
- 1976 NCAA Division I Men's Lacrosse Championship; 1976 Division I Player of the Year; 1976 Division I Attackman of the Year
- U.S. Lacrosse Hall of Fame, 1991; Canadian Lacrosse Hall of Fame, 2001; NLL Hall of Fame, 2007

Michael "Mike" G. French (born May 13, 1953) is a former three-time All-American lacrosse player at Cornell University from 1974 to 1976, teaming with fellow lacrosse Hall of Fame members Eamon McEneaney, Dan Mackesey, Bill Marino, Tom Marino, Bob Hendrickson, Chris Kane, and Richie Moran to lead the Cornell Big Red to the NCAA Men's Lacrosse Championship in 1976. French was co-owner, along with Russ Cline and Chris Fritz, as well as Executive Vice-President of the NLL's Philadelphia Wings.

== Cornell Big Red ==
French is ranked in the top 20 all-time in College Lacrosse scoring with 296 career points, 4th in career points-per-game behind fellow Canadian Stan Cockerton, and 7th in career goals. French's top season was 1976 when he scored 65 goals and handed out 40 assists for 105 total points in 16 games. French and McEneaney led Cornell to one of the great seasons in college lacrosse history in 1976, with an unbeaten record and a 16–13 overtime victory over Frank Urso and the University of Maryland in the NCAA Championship game. This was the first NCAA lacrosse championship to receive national exposure. With the game being decided in overtime and French scoring seven goals, Frank Gifford doing the play-by-play called the finals the most exciting sporting event he had ever seen. During French's career at Cornell, the Big Red went to three straight NCAA tournaments, shutting out Washington and Lee 14–0 in one tournament game, and won 43 games while losing only 4. He was named the USILA player of the year in 1976.

French was also a member of the Sphinx Head society while at Cornell.

== National Lacrosse League ==
French played for the Eagle Pro Box Lacrosse League Philadelphia Wings in 1987, leading the league in goals during its inaugural season. He was named the team's general manager in 1988, guiding the Wings to a 33–17 regular season mark and a 7–2 record in the postseason, with three championships over seven seasons. French also coached the Wings for one season in 1994, guiding them to a 6 and 2 record as well as the MILL title. He had been with the Wings since their inception in 1987 and joined the team's ownership group prior to the start of the 1998 season.

French is currently part of the ownership group of the New England Black Wolves which took over the retired Wings franchise.

== Canadian Lacrosse ==
Mike began playing box lacrosse in Niagara-on-the-Lake and St. Catharines, Ontario, Canada, and did not play field lacrosse until his freshman season at Cornell. French captained the Canadian National Team to the 1978 World Lacrosse Championships upset over a heavily favored U.S. National Team. The World championships have been won by the American team every year except 1978, 2006 and 2014. In the 1978 title game, the Canadian team rebounded from a 28–4 loss to the Americans in an early round game to beat them 17–16 in overtime for the World title.

== Post-playing career ==
French was inducted into the National Lacrosse Hall of Fame in 1991, the Canadian Lacrosse Hall of Fame in 2001, and the NLL Hall of Fame in 2007. French is one of only a few members of both the Canadian and US Lacrosse Halls of Fame.

French is currently one of three Partners for PricewaterhouseCoopers LLP Hospitality & Leisure Advisory practice. French is also an investor in Baggataway Tavern, located in West Conshohocken, Pennsylvania.

== Statistics ==
=== Cornell University ===
Season	GP	G	A	Pts	PPG
1976	16	65	40	105	6.56
1975	17	63	34	97	5.71
1974	14	63	31	94	6.71
Totals	47	191^{[a]}	105	296	6.30^{[b]}

^{[a]} 11th in Division I career goals
^{[b]} 4th in Division I career points-per-game

=== Philadelphia Wings ===
Season	GP	G	A	Pts	GB
1987	6	14	9	23	---

=== OLA/WLA/MSL statistics ===
			Regular Season					Playoffs
Season	Team	League	GP	G	A	Pts	PIM	GP	G	A	Pts	PIM
1970	Niagara Warriors	OLA Jr B	24	70	40	110	29	11	17	13	30	7
1971	Niagara Warriors	OLA Jr B	24	98	67	165^{[a]}	24	16	47	34	81	20
1972	Niagara Warriors	OLA Jr B	30	112	87	199^{[b]}	70	4	6	8	14	7
1973	Niagara Warriors	OLA Jr B	24	59	72	131	--	13	29	42	71	--
1974	Niagara Warriors	OLA Jr B	10	32	33	65	--	9	16	19	35	--
1975	Brantford Warriors	MSL	10	26	17	43	24	--	--	--	--	--
1976	Owen Sound North Stars	MSL	14	43	35	78	4	6	14	18	32	2
1976	Brampton Excelsiors	MSL	--	--	--	--	--	7	9	13	22	10
1977	Owen Sound North Stars	MSL	8	16	25	41	11	15	21	37	58	12
1977	Brampton Excelsiors	MSL	--	--	--	--	--	6	5	11	16	2
PRO/MAJOR/SENIOR TOTALS			32	456	376	832	39	34	49	79	128	26

^{[a]} Top Scorer In O.L.A. Junior B Western Division - 1971, 1972
^{[b]} Second All-Time in Career O.L.A. Junior B Regular Season Points

== See also ==
- 1976 NCAA Division I Men's Lacrosse Championship
- Cornell Big Red men's lacrosse
- Lacrosse in Pennsylvania
- National Lacrosse Hall of Fame

Preceded by Frank Urso	Lt. Raymond Enners Award; 1976	Succeeded by Eamon McEneaney
Preceded by Eamon McEneaney	Jack Turnbull Award; 1976	Succeeded by Mike O'Neill
