= Eamon McEneaney =

American lacrosse player and poet (1954–2001)

Personal information
- Nationality: American
- Born: December 23, 1954 Rockville Centre, Long Island, New York
- Died: September 11, 2001 (aged 46) North Tower, World Trade Center, New York City, U.S.
- Cause of death: Collapse of 1 World Trade Center as part of the September 11 attacks

Sport
- Position: Attack
- Shoots: Right
- NCAA team: Cornell University

Career highlights
- 1976 NCAA Championship; 1977 NCAA Championship; 1978 World Lacrosse Championship; Inducted into the National Lacrosse Hall of Fame in 1992

Eamon James McEneaney (December 23, 1954 – September 11, 2001) was an All-American lacrosse player at Cornell University from 1975 to 1977 and later an employee of Cantor Fitzgerald who died during the September 11 attacks.

== Lacrosse career ==
McEneaney teamed with Mike French and Dan Mackesey to win the 1976 NCAA Championship, a key part of Cornell teams which won 29 straight games and two straight titles over two seasons.

McEneaney was voted the outstanding player in the 1977 NCAA Championship game, while setting an NCAA tournament record with 25 points in three tournament games, with 11 goals and 14 assists, one of the great lacrosse finals performances.

McEneaney represented the United States in the 1978 World Lacrosse Championships.

McEneaney was inducted into the Cornell Sports Hall of Fame in 1982. He was inducted into the National Lacrosse Hall of Fame in 1992.

McEneaney's jersey number (#10) was retired by Cornell University on April 27, 2002, in tribute to him.

=== Cornell University lacrosse statistics ===
Statistics per Cornell University media guides

Season	GP	G	A	Pts	PPG
1975	17	31	65	96	5.65
1976	16	20	61	81	5.06
1977	13	41	38	79	6.08
Totals	46	92	164 ^{(a)}	256	5.57 ^{(b)}

^{(a)} 5th in NCAA career assists per game
^{(b)} 14th in NCAA career points per game

== Writer and poet ==
Known for his athletic talents, McEneaney was also a poet and had desires to write a novel. His family, in partnership with the Cornell University Library, published a posthumous collection of his poetry entitled A Bend in the Road.

In 2010, Eamon's widow Bonnie published Messages: Signs, Visits, and Premonitions from Loved Ones Lost on 9/11, a collection of stories regarding people who have had supernatural experiences with friends and family members who died during the September 11 attacks.

== Death and legacy ==
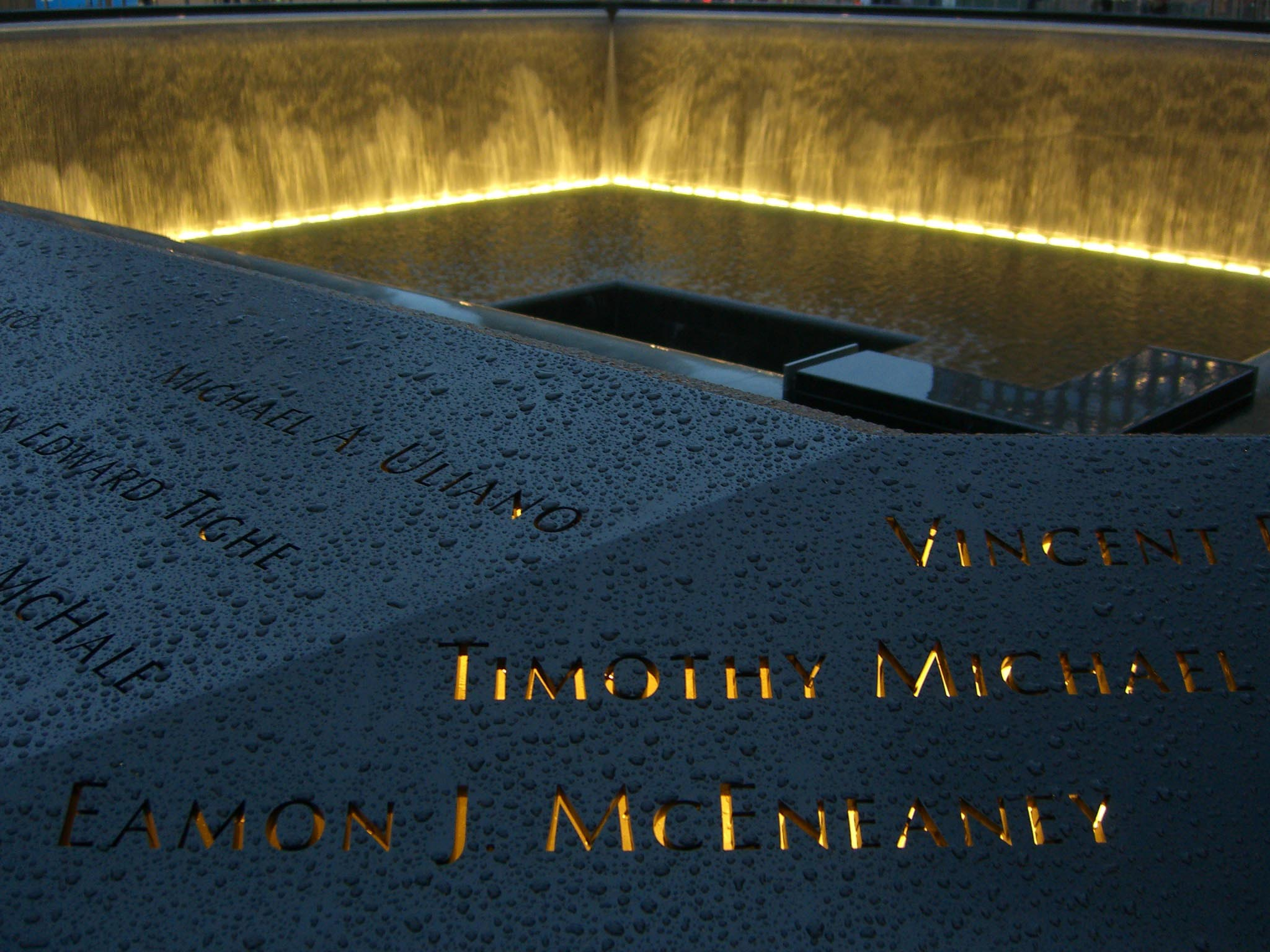
McEneaney's name is located on Panel N-57 of the National September 11 Memorial's North Pool.

McEneaney was working for Cantor Fitzgerald on the 105th floor of the North Tower in September 2001. When American Airlines Flight 11 was deliberately crashed into the tower between floors 93–99 at 8:46 A.M., all escape routes were cut off for anyone higher than the 91st floor, and McEneaney became one of roughly 800 people trapped in the upper floors of the burning skyscraper. McEneaney either died from smoke inhalation, the intense heat, or he eventually perished when the North Tower collapsed at 10:28 A.M., killing all remaining survivors that were trapped above the impact zone. His remains were found just five days later. At the National September 11 Memorial, McEneaney is memorialized at the North Pool, on Panel N-57, alongside other employees of Cantor Fitzgerald killed in the September 11 attacks.

== See also ==
- Cornell Big Red men's lacrosse
- National Lacrosse Hall of Fame

== Awards ==
Preceded by Mike French	Lt. Raymond Enners Award; 1977	Succeeded by Mike O'Neill
Preceded by Jack Thomas	Jack Turnbull Award; 1975	Succeeded by Mike French
