= Richie Moran (lacrosse) =

American lacrosse player and coach (1937–2022)

Biographical details
- Born: January 18, 1937; Floral Park, New York, U.S.
- Died: April 24, 2022 (aged 85); Ithaca, New York, U.S.
- Education: University of Maryland

Playing career
- 1958–1960: Maryland
- Position: Midfield

Coaching career (HC unless noted)
- 1969–1997: Cornell

Head coaching record
- Overall: 257-121, 29 Years, .680 Winning Pct.

Accomplishments and honors

Championships
- 1971 NCAA national championship; 1976 NCAA national championship; 1977 NCAA national championship

Awards
- 1983 National Lacrosse Hall of Fame Inductee; 3× F. Morris Touchstone "Coach of the Year" Award (1971, 1977, 1987)

Richard M. Moran (January 18, 1937 – April 24, 2022) was an American Hall of Fame lacrosse player and coach.

== Playing career ==
His playing career began as an All-County midfielder at Sewanhaka High School in Floral Park, New York from 1951–1955, and he helped his team to four consecutive undefeated seasons before heading to the University of Maryland where he was a key performer on the 1959 Terrapins National Championship team.

== Head coaching career ==
Moran's head coaching career began in 1961 at Manhasset High School, where he compiled a 67-5 record over five seasons, winning the Long Island Championship from 1962 to 1964. In 1966, Moran became the first lacrosse coach at Elmont Memorial High School and promptly posted a 29-3 record and won two league championships in two seasons. He was also the head coach of the Long Island Athletic Club from 1966–1968, leading the team to a 31-4 record and capturing the 1968 club championship, the first-ever United States Club Lacrosse Association (USCLA) club title won by a northern team. In 1969, he succeeded the legendary Ned Harkness as the head men's lacrosse coach at Cornell University and went on to lead the Big Red for 29 seasons, winning three national championships (1971, 1976, 1977). His teams won 15 Ivy League championships, including ten straight from 1974 to 1983, and turned in three national runner-up performances, losing in the title game in 1978, 1987 and 1988. Moran also set an NCAA record as he guided his teams to 42 consecutive victories from 1976–78 and an Ivy League record 39 straight conference wins from 1973-1979.

During his tenure with the Big Red, Moran was named the USILA Coach of the Year three times (1971, 1977, 1987) the USILA Man of the Year (1975), and served as the head coach of Team USA in the 1978 World Lacrosse Championship. He served as the President of the Irish Lacrosse Foundation and coached Team Ireland in the World Lacrosse Championships in 2010 in Manchester, England, finishing 9th, in 2006 in London, Ontario, where the team took a seventh-place finish, in Perth, Australia in 2002, where the team went undefeated (5-0) en route to winning the Green Division title. Richie has also been involved in two European Lacrosse Championships with Team Ireland and prepared the team for the 2014 World Lacrosse Championships in Denver, CO.

== Post-coaching career ==
Moran was inducted into the Manhasset, Long Island and Upstate New York Lacrosse Halls of Fame, as well as the Cornell University Athletic Hall of Fame and most recently, the Nassau County Sports Hall of Fame in 2007. His 1976 and 1977 Cornell teams featuring players Mike French and Eamon McEneaney are frequently cited as among the top college lacrosse teams in NCAA history. Moran is also considered a lacrosse innovator by introducing the game to a greater pool of talented lacrosse players, specifically by recruiting box lacrosse players from Canada as well as high school talent from upstate New York. In 2012, Richie Moran received the "Spirit of Tewaaraton" award which is presented to an individual involved in the sport of lacrosse, who nobly reflects the finest virtues exemplified in the game, and who, over the course of his life, has made a significant contribution to society and to the lives of others.

In May 2016, Moran was inducted into the inaugural class of the Intercollegiate Men's Lacrosse Coaches Association (IMLCA) Hall of Fame.

In 2017, Moran published his autobiography "It's Great to Be Here", detailing his birth during the Great Depression, his family's great sacrifice during World War II, his years as an elite player and years as a revered and successful coach.

Moran died on April 24, 2022, at the age of 85. At the time, his family included his wife Pat, their three children, Kevin, Jennifer and Kathy, and their eight grandchildren, Kylie, Ryan, Chase, Lindsay, Adrienne, Eamon, Quinlan, and Finn.

== Head coaching record ==
Season	Wins	Losses	Postseason
1969	8	3	na
1970	11	0	No tournament, ranked Fifth in the nation
1971	13	1	Won NCAA Division I Championship
1972	10	3	-
1973	8	3	-
1974	12	2	Lost in semifinal of NCAA Division I tournament
1975	15	2	Lost in semifinal of NCAA Division I tournament
1976	16	0	Won NCAA Division I Championship
1977	13	0	Won NCAA Division I Championship
1978	13	1	Lost in Championship game of NCAA Division I tournament
1979	10	3	Lost in first round of NCAA Division I tournament
1980	8	5	Lost in first round of NCAA Division I tournament
1981	8	4	-----
1982	11	2	Lost in Semifinals of NCAA Division I tournament
1983	8	4	Lost in first round of NCAA Division I tournament
1984	6	6	------
1985	8	4	-----
1986	7	6	-----
1987	13	1	Lost in Championship game of NCAA Division I tournament
1988	9	6	Lost in Championship game of NCAA Division I tournament
1989	9	4	Lost in first round of NCAA Division I tournament
1990	7	6	-----
1991	8	5	-----
1992	7	5	-----
1993	4	7	-----
1994	1	10	-----
1995	8	6	Lost in first round of NCAA Division I tournament
1996	3	11	-----
1997	3	11	-----
Overall Record: 29 Years 257-121 .680

== See also ==
- Cornell Big Red men's lacrosse
- Members of the National Lacrosse Hall of Fame
- 1971 NCAA Division I Men's Lacrosse Championship
- 1976 NCAA Division I Men's Lacrosse Championship
- 1977 NCAA Division I Men's Lacrosse Championship
