= 1982 NCAA Division I men's lacrosse tournament =

- Dates: May 19–29, 1982
- Teams: 8
- Finals site: Scott Stadium, Charlottesville, Virginia
- Champions: North Carolina (2nd title)
- Runner-up: Johns Hopkins (9th title game)
- Semifinalists: Cornell (7th Final Four); Virginia (6th Final Four)
- Winning coach: Willie Scroggs (2nd title)
- MOP: Dave Wingate, Attack, North Carolina
- Attendance: 10,283 finals 22,892 total
- Top scorers: Mike Burnett, North Carolina; Dave Wingate, North Carolina (11 goals)

The 1982 NCAA Division I lacrosse tournament was the 12th annual tournament hosted by the National Collegiate Athletic Association to determine the team champion of men's college lacrosse among its Division I programs at the end of the 1982 NCAA Division I men's lacrosse season.

Twelve NCAA Division I college men's lacrosse teams met after having played their way through a regular season, and for some, a conference tournament.

Defending champions North Carolina defeated Johns Hopkins in the championship game, 7–5, to claim their second NCAA national title.

The championship game was played at Scott Stadium at the University of Virginia in Charlottesville, Virginia on May 29, with 10,283 fans in attendance.

== Overview ==
This was the second straight defeat of Hopkins by the University of North Carolina in the finals. The Tar Heels carried a 7–3 lead heading into the fourth quarter, with attackman Dave Wingate scoring five goals for Carolina. The Tar Heels won 26th straight games over two seasons, finally losing the first game of the 1983 season against Hobart.

UNC used an aggressive zone defense against Hopkins and UNC goalie Tom Sears made the saves when he had to, finishing with 16 saves. Dave Wingate scored 5 goals for UNC, and Brian Holman finished with 19 saves for Hopkins.

== Bracket ==
Quarterfinals; May 19
1	North Carolina	16
8	Navy	2
4	Cornell	11
5	Army	9
3	Virginia	15
6	Adelphi	7
2	Johns Hopkins	14
7	Maryland	9

Semifinals; May 22
1	North Carolina	15
4	Cornell	8
3	Virginia	9
2	Johns Hopkins	13

Championship; May 29
1	North Carolina	7
2	Johns Hopkins	5

== Box scores ==
=== Finals ===
Team	1	2	3	4	Total
North Carolina	3	1	3	0	7
Johns Hopkins	0	1	2	2	5
North Carolina scoring – Dave Wingate 5, Pete Voelkel, Jeff Homire; Johns Hopkins scoring – Mike Donnelly 3, Bill Cantelli 2; Shots: Johns Hopkins 50, North Carolina 39; Saves: Johns Hopkins 20, North Carolina 16

=== Semifinals ===
- May 22, 1982

Team	1	2	3	4	Total
North Carolina	4	6	3	2	15
Cornell	2	1	1	4	8
North Carolina scoring – Mike Burnett 3, Dave Wingate 2, Doug Hall 2, Ted Millspaugh 2, Brent Voelkel 2, Jeff Homire 2, Andy Smith, Randy Cox; Cornell scoring – Tarik Ergin, Matt Crowley, Bruce Bruno, Steve Fitzpatrick, Ken Entenmann, Andy Phillips, Earle Weaver, Tom Spaulding.; Shots: Cornell 38, North Carolina 54; Saves: Cornell 17, North Carolina 12

Team	1	2	3	4	Total
Johns Hopkins	5	0	4	4	13
Virginia	2	4	2	1	9
Johns Hopkins scoring – Peter Scott 3, Mike Donnelly 3, Henry Ciccarone 2, Bill Cantelli 2, Jeff Cook, John Krumenacker, Marty Bergin; Virginia scoring – Matt Rainis 3, Mike Caravana 2, Ray Giusto, Bill Seery, Scott Gerham, Bill Wyker; Shots: Johns Hopkins 36, Virginia 35; Saves: Virginia 13, Johns Hopkins 11

=== Quarterfinals ===
Team	1	2	3	4	Total
North Carolina	6	4	2	4	16
Navy	0	0	1	1	2
North Carolina scoring – Dave Wingate 4, Doug Hall 3, Brent Voelkel 3, Jeff Homire 2, Andy Smith, Pete Voelkel, Steve Stenersen, Dan Aburn; Navy scoring – Bob Sturgell 2; Shots: North Carolina 55, Navy 20; Saves: Navy 7, North Carolina 3

Team	1	2	3	4	Total
Cornell	2	7	1	1	11
Army	3	3	2	1	9
Cornell scoring – Matt Crowley 3, Tarik Ergin 2, Ken Entenmann 2, Wade Bollinger, Andy Phillips, Jamie Smith, Michael Higgins; Army scoring – Harry Jackson 3, Bill Sardella 2, P.J. O’Sullivan 2, Frank Giordano, Bill Bauer; Shots: Army 34, Cornell 27; Saves: Cornell 13, Army 7

Team	1	2	3	4	Total
Virginia	5	3	1	6	15
Adelphi	5	0	0	2	7
Virginia scoring – Rick Giusto 3, Mike Caravana 2, Ray Giusto 2, Bill Wyker 2, Jeff Nicklas 2, Scott Gerham, Randy Natoli, John Gillin, Rich Riccardi; Adelphi scoring – Steve Day 3, Kevin Meinsen, Bob Cook, Wade Melton, Joe LoCascio; Shots: Virginia 56, Adelphi 33; Saves: Adelphi 21, Virginia 12

Team	1	2	3	4	Total
Johns Hopkins	4	5	4	1	14
Maryland	4	3	1	1	9
Johns Hopkins scoring – Peter Scott 4, John Krumenacker 4, Bill Cantelli 2, Jeff Cook 2, Joe Ciletti, Jim Esposito; Maryland scoring – Tim Worstell 2, Don Sadler 2, Jim Wilkerson, Jay Harkey, Tony Olmert, Geoffrey Nordberg, Jack Francis; Shots: Johns Hopkins 50, Maryland 35; Saves: Maryland 24, Johns Hopkins 10

== Outstanding players ==
- Tom Sears, North Carolina (Named the tournament's Most Outstanding Player)

=== Leading scorers ===
Leading scorers	GP	G	A	Pts
Dave Wingate, North Carolina	3	11	0	11
Mike Burnett, North Carolina	3	3	8	11
Mike Caravana, Virginia	2	4	5	9
Peter Scott, Johns Hopkins	3	7	1	8
Art Lux, Syracuse	3	8	2	8
Dave Desko, Syracuse	3	6	2	8
Peter Scott, Johns Hopkins	3	6	1	7
John Krumenacker, Johns Hopkins	3	3	4	7
Henry Ciccarone Jr., Johns Hopkins	3	3	4	7
Dave Wingate, North Carolina	2	5	1	6

== See also ==
- 1982 NCAA women's lacrosse tournament (inaugural edition)
- 1982 NCAA Division III lacrosse tournament
