= 1976 NCAA Division II lacrosse tournament =

American men's college lacrosse

1976 NCAA Division II Men's Lacrosse Championship
Tournament information
- Sport: College lacrosse
- Location: Catonsville, Maryland
- Venue(s): UMBC Stadium
- Participants: 12

Final positions
- Champions: Hobart (1st title)
- Runner-up: Adelphi (1st title game)

Tournament statistics
- Matches played: 11
- Goals scored: 257 (23.36 per match)
- Attendance: 5,490 (499 per match)
- Top scorer(s): John Cheek, Washington College (20)

The 1976 NCAA Division II Lacrosse Championship was the third annual single-elimination tournament to determine the national champions of NCAA Division II men's college lacrosse in the United States.

The championship game was played at UMBC Stadium at the University of Maryland, Baltimore County in Catonsville, Maryland.

After losing in the final the prior two seasons, Hobart defeated Adelphi, 19−9, to win their first national title.

The Statesmen (14–3) were coached by Jerry Schmidt.

== Bracket ==
First Round
Baltimore	8
UMBC	6
Washington College	25
Plymouth State	5
Ohio Wesleyan	22
Kutztown State	17
Hobart	19
FDU–Florham	6

Quarterfinals
Adelphi	7
Baltimore	2
Roanoke	15
Washington College	17
Cortland	11
Ohio Wesleyan	12
Towson State	6
Hobart	10

Semifinals
Adelphi	13
Washington College	10
Ohio Wesleyan	5
Hobart	14

Championship
Adelphi	9
Hobart	18

== See also ==
- 1976 NCAA Division I lacrosse tournament
