= Stephen Patrick DeMaine Kelly =

American lacrosse player (born 1994)

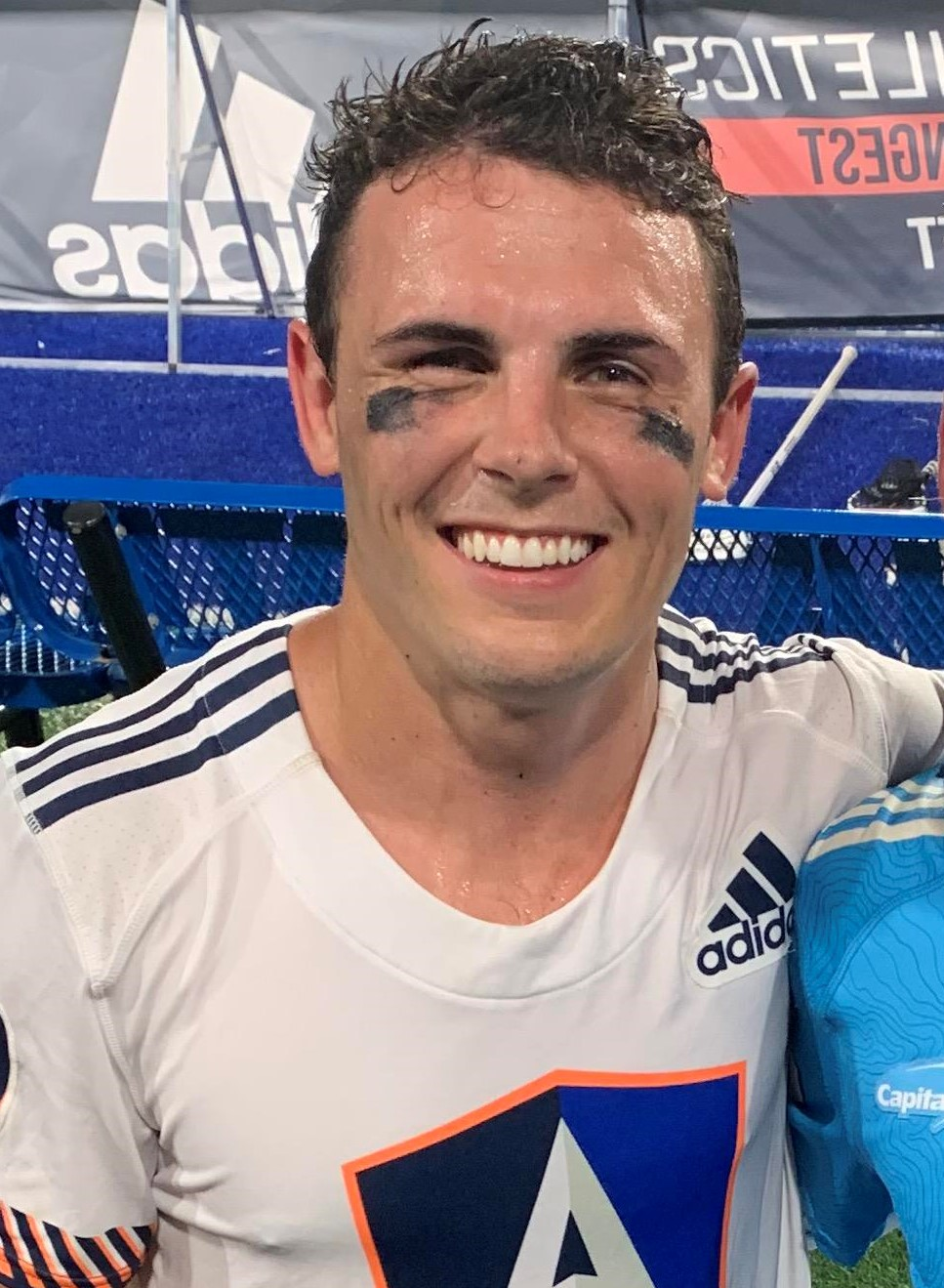

Personal information
- Nickname: Bones
- Born: November 21, 1994 (age 31) Lutherville, Maryland, U.S.
- Height: 5 ft 11 in (180 cm)
- Weight: 185 lb (84 kg; 13 st 3 lb)

Sport
- Position: Face-off specialist
- Shoots: Left
- MLL draft: 48th overall, 2017; Chesapeake Bayhawks
- MLL teams: Chesapeake Bayhawks
- PLL team Former teams: Cannons LC; Archers LC
- NCAA team: North Carolina
- Pro career: 2017–

Stephen Patrick DeMaine Kelly (born November 21, 1994) is an American lacrosse player who plays for Cannons Lacrosse Club of the Premier Lacrosse League (PLL). Kelly plays as a midfielder and face-off specialist and scored the first goal in PLL history in 2019. Kelly was selected to play in the 2021 PLL All Star Game in San Jose, California.

Prior to joining the Archers, Kelly played for the Chesapeake Bayhawks in the Major League Lacrosse (MLL). He was selected to the MLL All-Star Team in 2018, and helped lead them to an overtime victory over Team USA.

Kelly attended University of North Carolina, Chapel Hill (UNC) from 2014 to 2017 where he played college lacrosse. In 2016, Kelly was named co-MVP of the National Championship team and was awarded the Turnbull Trophy. In 2017, Kelly was named team captain and helped lead UNC to an ACC Championship. Kelly is ranked 2nd in all-time face-off wins (718) and 3rd in all-time most ground balls (378) at UNC.

Kelly played high school lacrosse at Calvert Hall College High School where he was a two-time high school All-American and helped lead Calvert Hall to an MIAA championship in 2012. He was the youngest member of the 2012 USA Under 19 Lacrosse Team, helping the team win the gold medal at the FIL World Championship in Turku, Finland.

== Bio ==
=== Early years ===
Stephen Kelly was born at the Greater Baltimore Medical Center in Baltimore, Maryland, to Gayle and Frank Kelly III. He started playing lacrosse at age 6 at the Lutherville-Timonium Rec Council (LTRC). Kelly also played for the Fellowship of Christian Athletes (FCA) National Team which won the 2009 US Lacrosse U15 National Championship and he was named to the All-Tournament Team. Kelly continued playing lacrosse at Calvert Hall College High School, where he was a four-year letterman playing as a midfielder and face-off specialist. He was named team captain his Senior year.

Kelly also captained the football team at Calvert Hall where he was a three-year starter. He helped lead the team to their first football championship in 28 years. Kelly was named first-team All-MIAA as a running back and All-State as a defensive back in 2012.

=== College career ===
Kelly played college lacrosse at UNC where he was a four-year starter at face-off and team captain his senior year. Kelly was awarded the Holmes Harden Sr. Memorial Award all four years for leading the team in ground balls and was a two-time All-American. He ranks second in all time faceoff wins and third in all-time most ground balls in UNC Lacrosse history.

=== Professional career ===
==== MLL - Chesapeake Bayhawks ====
Stephen Kelly was one of the six UNC players to be selected in the MLL Draft as a sixth-round draft pick (#48) Midfielder/Face-off Specialist for the Bayhawks in 2017. Kelly was selected to play in the 2018 MLL All-Star game against Team USA.

==== PLL - Archers ====
On March 4, 2019, the PLL released their six team roster with Stephen Kelly as one of the Archer's Face-off Specialist. Kelly quickly made history on the League opening game (June 1, 2019 at Gillette Stadium in Foxborough, Massachusetts) against the Chrome Lacrosse Club winning the first face-off, first ground ball, and scoring the first goal in PLL history eleven seconds into the game.

He currently ranks (July 2019) third in League History for Ground Balls.

==== Cannons ====
Kelly was traded to Cannons Lacrosse Club, along with Archers' third-round pick in the 2022 PLL College Draft, in exchange for Cannons' third and fourth-round picks in the same draft.

== Career statistics ==
=== Collegiate ===
YEAR	TEAM	GP	G	A	PTS	SH	SH%	SOG	SOG%	GW	UP	DN	GB	TO	CT	FO	FO%
2017	UNC	15	3	0	3	13	.231	8	61.5	1	0	0	103	5	3	181-344	52.6
2016	UNC	18	3	6	9	21	.143	9	42.9	1	0	0	126	4	3	249-434	57.4
2015	UNC	17	2	2	4	14	.143	8	57.1	0	0	0	102	9	1	214-425	50.4
2014	UNC	8	2	0	2	9	.222	6	66.7	0	0	0	47	1	0	74-121	61.2
TOTALS		58	10	8	18	57	.175	31	.544	2	0	0	378	19	7	718-1324	.542

=== MLL ===
YEAR	TEAM	GP	G	2G	A	PTS	PIM	PPG	SHG	GWG	Shts	SOG	S%	SG%	GB	TOC	CTO	FO	FW	FO%
2018	Chesapeake Bayhawks	14	1	0	1	2	2	0	0	0	11	8	9.1	12.5	101	2	2	361	196	54.3
TOTALS		14	1	0	1	2	2	0	0	0	11	8	9.1	12.5	101	2	2	361	196	54.3

=== PLL ===
Season	Team	Regular season											Playoffs										
Season	Team	GP	G	2PG	A	Pts	Sh	GB	Pen	PIM	FOW	FOA	GP	G	2PG	A	Pts	Sh	GB	Pen	PIM	FOW	FOA
2019	Archers	10	3	0	4	7	8	56	0	0	92	193	3	1	0	2	3	1	27	0	0	36	51
2020	Archers	6	0	0	0	0	1	23	0	0	40	81	–	–	–	–	–	–	–	–	–	–	–
2021	Archers	8	3	0	1	4	8	47	0	0	89	193	1	0	0	0	0	0	2	0	0	7	19
2022	Cannons	9	4	0	1	5	7	65	0	0	106	217	–	–	–	–	–	–	–	–	–	–	–
2023	Cannons	4	0	0	1	1	3	23	0	0	35	87	–	–	–	–	–	–	–	–	–	–	–
		37	10	0	7	17	27	214	0	0	362	771	4	1	0	2	3	1	29	0	0	43	70
Career total:		41	11	0	9	20	28	243	0	0	405	841											

GP–Games played; G–Goals; 2PG–2-point goals; A–Assists; Pts–Points; Sh–Shots; GB–Ground balls; Pen–Penalties; PIM–Penalty minutes; FOW–Faceoffs won; FOA–Faceoffs attempted

== Awards and honors ==
=== High school lacrosse ===
- 4 year letterman: midfielder and face-off specialist
- 2013 Under Armour All-American
- Inside Lacrosse Magazine: No. 2 ranked No. 1 midfielder in class of 2013
- U.S. Lacrosse high school All- American: 2012, 2013
- C. Markland Kelly Award Finalist: top Male Lacrosse player in the MIAA (Maryland Interscholastic Athletic Association)
- Baltimore Sun first-team All-Metro honors: 2011, 2012, 2013
- First-team All-MIAA: 2011, 2012, 2013
- Towson Times Co-Player of the year: 2012, 2013
- Team captain: 2013
- MIAA “A” Conference Championship game: 2011, 2012
- 2012 USA Under 19 Lacrosse Team – FIL World Champion Turku, Finland – Gold Medalist

=== High school football ===
- Three-year starter
- Team captain (2012)
- First-Team All-MIAA running back
- All-State defensive back: 2012
- Baltimore Sun High School Athlete of the Year finalist (2012 and 2013)
- McMullen Scholar
- Nation Honor Society: 4.0 Cumulative GPA
- Spanish National Honor Society
- FCA (Fellowship of Christian Athletes) Huddle: 4-year captain

=== Collegiate lacrosse ===
==== Freshman year 2014 ====
- Holmes Harden Sr., Memorial Award - Ground Ball Leader
- ACC Academic honor roll
- Carolina Leadership Academy Rising Star

==== Sophomore year 2015 ====
- Holmes Harden Sr., Memorial Award – Ground Ball Leader
- All-ACC Academic Team
- ACC Player of the Week
  - March 30, 2015

==== Junior year 2016 ====
- UNC Turnbull Trophy winner as co-MVP of team
- USILA All-America Honorable mention
- First Team All-ACC Team
- All-ACC Team – face-off specialist
- All-ACC Academic Team
- Holmes Harden Sr., Memorial Award – Ground Ball Leader
- ACC Defensive Player of the Week
  - February 29, 2016
  - March 21, 2016
  - April 25, 2016
- Baltimore Sun National Player of the Week
  - April 28, 2016

==== Senior year 2017 ====
- USILA Scholar All–American Team
- All-ACC Academic team
- ACC Player of the Week:
  - February 6, 2017
  - April 11, 2017
- Holmes Harden Sr., Memorial Award – Ground Ball Leader
- Inside Lacrosse All-American Team Honorable Mention
- Team Face-off Yearbook Preseason 3rd All-America Selection
- Tewaaraton Trophy Watch List

== Personal life ==
Stephen Kelly graduated UNC with a degree in business administration. Kelly currently lives in Atlanta, Georgia working as a Director of Corporate Development at OneDigital Health and Benefits. He is a co-owner of K-2 Lacrosse Training with his brother, Frankie Kelly. Some of his interests outside of lacrosse are golf, tennis and hiking. Kelly has three siblings. He married Caroline Dilli in 2021.
