= Peter Milliman =

American lacrosse player and coach

Peter Milliman is an American lacrosse coach and former professional player. In 2020, he was named the 23rd head coach in Johns Hopkins Blue Jays men's lacrosse history after serving as the Richard M. Moran Head Coach for the Cornell Big Red men's lacrosse for three seasons.

== Early life and education ==
Milliman was born and raised by a single mother in Rochester, New York. While attending Brighton High School, Milliman began playing lacrosse in order to stay in shape for football season. He was also inspired by Indigenous coach Sid Jamieson at a summer camp to continue playing the game. Following graduation from Canterbury School in 1997, he attended Gettysburg College where he was a three-time Division III All-America and three-time All-Centennial Conference pick. However, he struggled academically at Gettysburg and dropped out of the school with no more athletic eligibility and a few credits short of graduating.

== Career ==
Upon leaving Gettysburg, Milliman was drafted in the fifth-round, 26th overall, by the Rochester Rattlers in the 2003 Major League Lacrosse’s (MLL) Supplemental Draft. He went on to play professionally for four years with Rattlers, winning an MLL Championship in 2008. While playing professional lacrosse, Milliman served as an assistant coach for the RIT Tigers and Siena College. After winning an MLL Championship, Milliman was named men's assistant lacrosse coach at Pfeiffer University for the Pfeiffer Falcons. While serving in this role, he was the recipient of two Conference Carolinas Coach of the Year awards. He stayed in this role until 2012 when he accepted an assistant defensive coordinator position at Princeton University. As the assistant defensive coordinator, he helped the Tigers to a 9–6 record overall and a mark of 3–3 in the Ivy League during the 2013 season.

After one year at Princeton, Milliman was named Princeton's offensive coordinator but chose to leave and accept an assistant coach position for the Cornell Big Red men's lacrosse team. During the 2014 campaign, Milliman helped the team to a 9–0 record to begin the season and 11–5 overall. As a result, he was named the Mario St. George Boiardi '04 Associate Head Coach of Men's Lacrosse. During the offseason, he chose to serve as a volunteer head coach for Team Russia at the 2014 World Lacrosse Championship after being recruited by Eugene Arkhipov. Prior to this, he had been unaware Russia had a lacrosse team and had never seen any of the players compete live.

Milliman was made Richard M. Moran Head Coach of Men's Lacrosse in 2018 and in his first season, the team qualified for the NCAA quarterfinals for the first time in two years. The team went on to finish second in the conference and won the program's first Ivy League Tournament title since 2011. The following year, he was named an assistant coach for Team USA at the 2019 World Indoor Lacrosse Championship where he helped them to their fifth straight bronze medal.

During the COVID-19 pandemic, Milliman was named the 23rd head coach in Johns Hopkins Blue Jays men's lacrosse history.

== Personal life ==
Milliman is married to Megan Milliman (nee Fox), a lacrosse coach at Wells College. They have two daughters together.

== Head coaching record ==
Record table
Season	Team	Overall	Conference	Standing	Postseason
Cornell Big Red (Ivy League) (2018–2020)
2018	Cornell	13–5	4–2	2nd	NCAA Division I quarterfinals
2019	Cornell	10–5	4–2	3rd	
2020	Cornell	5–0	0–0		Season canceled due to COVID-19
Cornell:		28–10 (.737)	8–4 (.667)		
Johns Hopkins Blue Jays (Big Ten Conference) (2021–present)
2021	Johns Hopkins	4–9	2–8	T–5th	
2022	Johns Hopkins	7–9	2–3	4th	
2023	Johns Hopkins	12–6	4–1	T–1st	NCAA Division I quarterfinals
2024	Johns Hopkins	11–5	5–0	1st	NCAA Division I quarterfinals
2025	Johns Hopkins	6–8	0–5	6th	
Johns Hopkins:		40–37 (.519)	13–17 (.433)		
Total:		68–47 (.591)			
National champion Postseason invitational champion Conference regular season champion Conference regular season and conference tournament champion Division regular season champion Division regular season and conference tournament champion Conference tournament champion
