= Washington and Lee Generals =

- University: Washington and Lee University
- Nickname: Generals
- NCAA: Division III
- Conference: Old Dominion Athletic Conference
- Athletic director: Jan Hathorn
- Location: Lexington, Virginia
- Varsity teams: 25
- Football stadium: Wilson Field
- Basketball arena: Warner Center
- Baseball stadium: Cap'n Dick Smith Field
- Soccer stadium: Alston Parker Watt Field
- Colors: Blue and white
- Website: generalssports.com

The Washington and Lee Generals are the athletic teams that represent Washington and Lee University, located in Lexington, Virginia, in NCAA Division III intercollegiate sports. The Generals compete as members of the Old Dominion Athletic Conference for all sports except wrestling, which competes in the Centennial Conference. All together, Washington and Lee sponsors 25 sports: 13 for men and 12 for women.

Washington and Lee was one of the founding members of the Virginia Intercollegiate Athletic Association in 1900, as well as the Division I Southern Conference in 1921. The Generals remained members of the SoCon until 1958. During this time, they played alongside other Virginia universities like Virginia, Virginia Tech, VMI (also located in Lexington), and William & Mary. Generals basketball won the Southern Conference twice: 1934 and 1937. The football team even made an appearance in the 1951 Gator Bowl against Wyoming.

After leaving the Southern Conference, the Generals moved into Division III and joined the College Athletic Conference in 1962. This was followed by a move to the Old Dominion Athletic Conference in 1976, also as a founding member. Washington and Lee's men's lacrosse remained the school's only Division I program until 1987.

== Varsity teams ==
Men's sports	Women's sports
Baseball	Basketball
Basketball	Cross country
Cross country	Equestrian
Football	Field hockey
Golf	Golf
Lacrosse	Lacrosse
Soccer	Soccer
Swimming	Softball
Tennis	Swimming
Track and field	Tennis
Wrestling	Track and field
	Volleyball

=== Men's lacrosse ===
Washington and Lee's first lacrosse team was fielded in 1938 and started the Dixie Lacrosse League along with Virginia, Duke, and North Carolina. The Generals soon were successful winning the Dixie League Championship in 1939 and 1940. No team was fielded from 1943 through 1946. The team resumed play in 1947.

After the school downgraded to Division III in 1958, the men's lacrosse team remained at the Division I level until 1987. Washington and Lee participated in seven NCAA Division I Men's Lacrosse Championship tournaments: 1972, 1973, 1974, 1975, 1976, 1977, 1978, 1980. The Generals reached the tournament's semifinals three times: 1973, 1974, and 1975.

Since 1987, Washington and Lee have won thirteen Old Dominion Athletic Conference (ODAC) Lacrosse Championships: 1991, 1993, 1994, 1995, 1999, 2000, 2002, 2004, 2009, 2016, 2019, 2023, and 2025. Washington and Lee have participated in seventeen NCAA Division III Men's Lacrosse Championship tournaments: 1987, 1991, 1993, 1998, 1999, 2000, 2002, 2004, 2009, 2013, 2016, 2018, 2019, 2022, 2023, 2024, & 2025. The Generals reached the quarterfinals five times: 1998, 1999, 2004, 2023, and 2024. The Generals reached the semifinals four times: 1987, 2000, 2002, and 2024.

Washington and Lee Hall of Fame Coach Jack Emmer is known for creating The Armadillo play where five players would surround a player with the ball, facing him and locking arms showing the defense only their backs. Any attempt by the defense to retrieve the ball would result in a penalty. Washington and Lee would then be able to run a man-up offense as a result of the penalty. Washington and Lee successfully used this play during the 1982 game against UNC. Following the game, The Armadillo was outlawed by the NCAA rules committee.

Washington and Lee lacrosse is also known for being on the losing side of one of the greatest upsets in lacrosse history when unranked Morgan State defeated the number 1 ranked Generals in the first game of the season in 1975. W&L had a 28 game regular season winning streak and had not lost at home in three years at the time.

Washington and Lee has played VMI every year since 1986. VMI is W&L's next-door neighbor in Lexington, VA. From 1988 until 2019, the game was known as the “Lee-Jackson Lacrosse Classic”. The Classic was named after Robert E. Lee and Stonewall Jackson. Lee served as W&L's president from 1865-1870 and Jackson was a professor at VMI from 1851-1861. The Lee-Jackson trophy was a plaque featuring crossed swords. The Classic was held every spring as part of the main lacrosse season until 2007 when it moved to the fall as an exhibition game. Since 2022, the game has been held as a scrimmage and has been part of the HEADstrong Fall Events Series hosted by VMI. W&L holds a 34-6-1 lead in the all-time series against VMI.

Washington and Lee competes against Christopher Newport every year for the Virginia LtN Cup and generates support for LtN. LtN or "Lacrosse the Nations" is an organization that uses lacrosse and other physical activities to teach important life skills and help improve education and health while creating opportunity and hope for children in need. Christopher Newport holds a 9-6 lead in the all time series against Washington and Lee.

== Championships ==
=== National Championships ===
Washington and Lee holds two NCAA National Championship titles. In 1988, the men's tennis team won the NCAA Division III National Championship title. In 2007, the women's tennis team claimed the NCAA Division III National Championship title. In 2006, 2010, 2011, 2012, 2015, 2017, and 2021 the Generals football team won the Old Dominion Athletic Conference championship. In 2009, the Generals baseball team won the ODAC championship.

=== Conference tournament championships ===
Titles indicate Old Dominion Athletic Conference championships unless otherwise noted.

Sport	Titles	Winning years
Baseball	2	1972 (Note: College Athletic Conference), 2009
Basketball (m)	10	1934, 1938 (Note: Southern Conference), 1967, 1968, 1970, 1971, 1976, 1977, 1978, 1980
Basketball (w)	4	2010, 2023, 2024, 2026
Cross Country (m)	19	1914 (Note: South Atlantic Intercollegiate Athletics Association), 1916, 1917, 1972, 1982, 1984, 1994, 1995, 1997, 2004, 2005, 2006, 2007, 2015, 2016, 2017, 2018, 2019, 2025
Cross Country (w)	21	1990, 1992, 1993, 1994, 1996, 1999, 2000, 2004, 2005, 2006, 2007, 2008, 2010, 2012, 2015, 2016, 2017, 2018, 2019, 2024, 2025
Equestrian	3	2006, 2014, 2022
Field hockey	5	2005, 2017, 2021, 2022, 2026
Golf (m)	18	1934, 1955, 1972, 1973, 1977, 1978, 1983, 1988, 1990, 1991, 1994, 1995, 1997, 1999, 2008, 2009, 2016, 2019
Golf (w)	8	2015, 2018, 2019, 2021, 2022, 2023, 2024, 2025
Lacrosse (m)	16	1939, 1940 (Note: Dixie Conference), 1991, 1993, 1994, 1995, 1999, 2000, 2002, 2004, 2009, 2016, 2019, 2023, 2025, 2026
Lacrosse (w)	26	1992, 1993, 1998, 2001, 2003, 2004, 2005, 2006, 2007, 2008, 2010, 2011, 2012, 2013, 2014, 2015, 2016, 2017, 2018, 2019, 2021, 2022, 2023, 2024, 2025, 2026
Soccer (m)	8	1986, 1989, 2000, 2015, 2018, 2019, 2022, 2024
Soccer (w)	7	2002, 2003, 2009, 2016, 2024, 2025, 2026
Swimming (m)	19	1935, 1936, 1937, 1938, 2004, 2005, 2006, 2007 (Note: Bluegrass Mountain Conference), 2015, 2016, 2017, 2018, 2019, 2020, 2022, 2023, 2024, 2025, 2026
Swimming (w)	35	1988, 1989, 1990, 1991, 1994, 1995, 1996, 1997, 1998, 1999, 2000, 2001, 2002, 2003, 2004, 2005, 2006, 2008, 2009, 2010, 2011, 2012, 2013, 2014, 2015, 2016, 2017, 2018, 2019, 2020, 2022, 2023, 2024, 2025, 2026
Tennis (m)	49	1967, 1968, 1969, 1972, 1973, 1976 (Note: Virginia College Athletic Association), 1977, 1978, 1979, 1980, 1983, 1985, 1986, 1987, 1988, 1989, 1990, 1991, 1992, 1993, 1994, 1996, 1997, 1998, 1999, 2000, 2001, 2002, 2003, 2004, 2005, 2006, 2007, 2008, 2010, 2011, 2012, 2013, 2014, 2015, 2016, 2017, 2018, 2019, 2021, 2022, 2023, 2024, 2026
Tennis (w)	35	1989, 1991, 1992, 1993, 1994, 1995, 1996, 1997, 1998, 1999, 2000, 2001, 2003, 2004, 2005, 2006, 2007, 2008, 2009, 2010, 2011, 2012, 2013, 2014, 2015, 2016, 2017, 2018, 2019, 2021, 2022, 2023, 2024, 2025, 2026
Track and field (m, indoor)	11	1930, 1984, 1985, 1986, 1987, 1988, 1989, 2017, 2018, 2019, 2020
Track and field (w, indoor)	3	2009, 2025, 2026
Track and field (m, outdoor)	6	1925 (State Champion), 1981, 1984, 1987, 1988, 2017
Track and field (w, outdoor)	3	1995, 2025, 2026
Volleyball	20	1995, 1997, 1998, 1999, 2001, 2002, 2003, 2004, 2005, 2006, 2007, 2008, 2012, 2013, 2014, 2018, 2020, 2021, 2023, 2025
Wrestling	14	1932, 1933, 1934, 1936, 1941, 1948, 1949, 1950, 1977, 1978, 1979, 2020, 2022, 2023

== NCAA Tournament Appearances ==
=== Baseball ===
2009
Southeast Regional
Salisbury, Maryland

Division	Round	Opponent	Result
Division III	First Round	Salisbury	L 2–3
Division III	Elimination Round	Washington & Jefferson	L 3–8

=== Men's Basketball ===
1975

Division	Round	Opponent	Result
Division III	First Round	Glassboro State	L 48–66
Division III	Regional 3rd Place Game	Methodist	L 58–71

1977

Division	Round	Opponent	Result
Division III	First Round	William Paterson	L 68–92
Division III	Regional 3rd Place Game	Glassboro State	L 87–103

1978

Division	Round	Opponent	Result
Division III	First Round	Jersey City State	W 66–65
Division III	Regional Championship	Kean	L 64–80

1980

Division	Round	Opponent	Result
Division III	First Round	Upsala	L 70–78
Division III	Regional 3rd Place Game	Allegheny	L 80–103

=== Women's Basketball ===
2010

Division	Round	Opponent	Result
Division III	First Round	Christopher Newport	L 51–68

2022

Division	Round	Opponent	Result
Division III	First Round	NYU	L 61–71

2023

Division	Round	Opponent	Result
Division III	First Round	Wisconsin–Oshkosh	L 55–58

2024

Division	Round	Opponent	Result
Division III	First Round	Vassar	W 68–61
Division III	Second Round	Catholic	W 80–70
Division III	Third Round	Rhode Island College	W 61–55
Division III	Quarterfinals	Wartburg	L 58–68

2025

Division	Round	Opponent	Result
Division III	First Round	Merchant Marine	W 65–53
Division III	Second Round	Baldwin Wallace	L 71–75

2026

Division	Round	Opponent	Result
Division III	First Round	St. Mary's (MD)	W 73-44
Division III	Second Round	Christopher Newport	W 61-55
Division III	Third Round	Bethel (MN)	W 75-67
Division III	Quarterfinals	Denison	L 64-77

=== Men's Cross Country ===
Appearances: 1975, 1995, 2016, 2023, 2024, 2025

=== Women's Cross Country ===
Appearances: 2019, 2024, 2025

=== Field Hockey ===
2005

Division	Round	Opponent	Result
Division III	First Round	Montclair State	L 0–2

2017

Division	Round	Opponent	Result
Division III	First Round	Denison	W 1–0 (2OT)
Division III	Second Round	Messiah	L 2–3

2021

Division	Round	Opponent	Result
Division III	Second Round	Scranton	W 2–0
Division III	Quarterfinals	Rowan	L 0–3

2022

Division	Round	Opponent	Result
Division III	First Round	Ohio Wesleyan	W 3–0
Division III	Second Round	Williams	L 0–3

2026

Division	Round	Opponent	Result
Division III	First Round	York (PA)	L 0-2

=== Men's Golf ===
Appearances: 1972, 1977, 1979, 1988, 1990, 1991, 2008, 2009, 2016, 2017, 2018, 2019, 2022, 2023, 2024

=== Women's Golf ===
Appearances: 2015, 2018, 2019, 2021, 2022, 2023

=== Men's Lacrosse ===
1972

Division	Round	Opponent	Result
Division I	First Round	Johns Hopkins	L 5–11

1973

Division	Round	Opponent	Result
Division I	First Round	Navy	W 13–12 (OT)
Division I	Semifinals	Maryland	L 7–18

1974

Division	Round	Opponent	Result
Division I	First Round	Navy	W 11–9
Division I	Semifinals	Johns Hopkins	L 10–11

1975

Division	Round	Opponent	Result
Division I	First Round	Johns Hopkins	W 11–7
Division I	Semifinals	Maryland	L 5–15

1976

Division	Round	Opponent	Result
Division I	First Round	Cornell	L 0–14

1977

Division	Round	Opponent	Result
Division I	First Round	Maryland	L 2–14

1978

Division	Round	Opponent	Result
Division I	First Round	Cornell	L 2–12

1980

Division	Round	Opponent	Result
Division I	First Round	Syracuse	L 4–12

1987

Division	Round	Opponent	Result
Division III	First Round	Roanoke	W 19–11
Division III	Semifinals	Ohio Wesleyan	L 4–17

1991

Division	Round	Opponent	Result
Division III	First Round	Ohio Wesleyan	L 10–19

1993

Division	Round	Opponent	Result
Division III	First Round	Ohio Wesleyan	L 8–9

1998

Division	Round	Opponent	Result
Division III	First Round	Denison	W 16–13
Division III	Quarterfinals	Ohio Wesleyan	L 8–17

1999

Division	Round	Opponent	Result
Division III	Quarterfinals	Denison	L 7–17

2000

Division	Round	Opponent	Result
Division III	First Round	Kenyon	W 22–4
Division III	Quarterfinals	Gettysburg	W 12–10
Division III	Semifinals	Salisbury	L 9–10

2002

Division	Round	Opponent	Result
Division III	First Round	Widener	W 13–8
Division III	Quarterfinals	Washington (MD)	W 11–8
Division III	Semifinals	Gettysburg	L 8–12

2004

Division	Round	Opponent	Result
Division III	First Round	Messiah	W 12–8
Division III	Quarterfinals	Salisbury	L 6–15

2009

Division	Round	Opponent	Result
Division III	First Round	FDU–Florham	W 6–5
Division III	Second Round	Gettysburg	L 10–15

2013

Division	Round	Opponent	Result
Division III	First Round	Sewanee	W 19–6
Division III	Second Round	Salisbury	L 4–7

2016

Division	Round	Opponent	Result
Division III	First Round	Sewanee	W 9–5
Division III	Second Round	York (PA)	L 5–12

2018

Division	Round	Opponent	Result
Division III	Second Round	Transylvania	W 23–5
Division III	Third Round	Dickinson	L 9–10

2019

Division	Round	Opponent	Result
Division III	Second Round	Piedmont	W 23–2
Division III	Third Round	York (PA)	L 12–14

2022

Division	Round	Opponent	Result
Division III	Second Round	Cabrini	L 8–14

2023

Division	Round	Opponent	Result
Division III	Second Round	Centre	W 21–10
Division III	Third Round	Grove City	W 13–10
Division III	Quarterfinals	Salisbury	L 9–12

2024

Division	Round	Opponent	Result
Division III	Second Round	Lake Forest	W 17–4
Division III	Third Round	Lynchburg	W 16–13
Division III	Quarterfinals	Salisbury	W 16–15 (OT)
Division III	Semifinals	Tufts	L 13–19

2025

Division	Round	Opponent	Result
Division III	Second Round	Scranton	W 20–9
Division III	Third Round	Gettysburg	L 12–14

2026

Division	Round	Opponent	Result
Division III	Second Round	Gettysburg	W 19-10
Division III	Third Round	Christopher Newport	L 12-13

=== Women's Lacrosse ===
1993

Division	Round	Opponent	Result
Division III	First Round	Trenton State	L 4–18

1998

Division	Round	Opponent	Result
Division III	First Round	St. Mary's (MD)	L 8–11

2001

Division	Round	Opponent	Result
Division III	First Round	Mary Washington	L 6–10

2003

Division	Round	Opponent	Result
Division III	Regional Semifinals	Mary Washington	L 7–12

2004

Division	Round	Opponent	Result
Division III	Regional Semifinals	Gettysburg	L 8–13

2005

Division	Round	Opponent	Result
Division III	Regional Semifinals	Amherst	W 11–9
Division III	Regional Championship	Salisbury	L 4–15

2006

Division	Round	Opponent	Result
Division III	First Round	Christopher Newport	W 19–9
Division III	Regional Semifinals	TCNJ	L 6–16

2007

Division	Round	Opponent	Result
Division III	Regional Semifinals	Wooster	W 14–4
Division III	Regional Championship	Salisbury	L 7–10

2008

Division	Round	Opponent	Result
Division III	Regional Semifinals	Amherst	L 8–10

2010

Division	Round	Opponent	Result
Division III	First Round	Elizabethtown	L 12–13

2011

Division	Round	Opponent	Result
Division III	First Round	Christopher Newport	W 15–6
Division III	Regional Semifinals	Salisbury	L 12–13

2012

Division	Round	Opponent	Result
Division III	First Round	Mary Washington	L 8–16

2013

Division	Round	Opponent	Result
Division III	First Round	York (PA)	L 6–13

2014

Division	Round	Opponent	Result
Division III	Second Round	Denison	W 13–5
Division III	Third Round	TCNJ	L 7–13

2015

Division	Round	Opponent	Result
Division III	Second Round	Sewanee	W 18–4
Division III	Third Round	SUNY Fredonia	L 5–9

2016

Division	Round	Opponent	Result
Division III	First Round	Mount Union	L 10–11

2017

Division	Round	Opponent	Result
Division III	Second Round	Sewanee	W 18–4
Division III	Third Round	Catholic	W 9–6
Division III	Quarterfinals	William Smith	W 7–6 (OT)
Division III	Semifinals	TCNJ	L 4–5 (2OT)

2018

Division	Round	Opponent	Result
Division III	First Round	Cabrini	W 27–7
Division III	Second Round	York (PA)	L 3–10

2019

Division	Round	Opponent	Result
Division III	Second Round	Ithaca	W 18–9
Division III	Third Round	Wesleyan (CT)	L 7–13

2021

Division	Round	Opponent	Result
Division III	Second Round	FDU–Florham	W 19–5
Division III	Third Round	Ithaca	L 11–16

2022

Division	Round	Opponent	Result
Division III	Second Round	Transylvania	W 21–0
Division III	Third Round	Wesleyan (CT)	W 13–11
Division III	Quarterfinals	Gettysburg	L 4–8

2023

Division	Round	Opponent	Result
Division III	Second Round	Capital	W 22–5
Division III	Third Round	Wesleyan (CT)	L 8–11

2024

Division	Round	Opponent	Result
Division III	Second Round	Rhodes	W 17–7
Division III	Third Round	Christopher Newport	W 12–10
Division III	Quarterfinals	Salisbury	L 8–12

2025

Division	Round	Opponent	Result
Division III	First Round	Transylvania	W 26–2
Division III	Second Round	Sewanee	W 19–5
Division III	Third Round	Gettysburg	L 10–18

2026

Division	Round	Opponent	Result
Division III	Second Round	Christopher Newport	L 7-8 (OT)

=== Men's Soccer ===
2000

Division	Round	Opponent	Result
Division III	Second Round	Frostburg State	W 4–1
Division III	Third Round	Christopher Newport	L 0–1

2015

Division	Round	Opponent	Result
Division III	First Round	Methodist	W 3–0
Division III	Second Round	Haverford	L 1–2

2016

Division	Round	Opponent	Result
Division III	First Round	St. Lawrence	T 1–1 (2OT) (Advances 5-3 on PK)
Division III	Second Round	Franklin & Marshall	L 0–2

2017

Division	Round	Opponent	Result
Division III	First Round	Mary Washington	W 2–0
Division III	Second Round	Oglethorpe	T 3–3 (2OT) (Advances 5-4 on PK)
Division III	Third Round	North Park	L 0–3

2018

Division	Round	Opponent	Result
Division III	First Round	Johns Hopkins	T 0–0 (2OT) (Falls 2-4 on PK)

2019

Division	Round	Opponent	Result
Division III	First Round	NC Wesleyan	W 1–0
Division III	Second Round	Gettysburg	W 3–2
Division III	Third Round	Tufts	L 1–2 (OT)

2021

Division	Round	Opponent	Result
Division III	First Round	Baruch	W 6–1
Division III	Second Round	Covenant	W 2–1
Division III	Third Round	Christopher Newport	W 3–2
Division III	Quarterfinals	Messiah	W 3–1
Division III	Semifinals	Connecticut College	L 1–2 (OT)

2022

Division	Round	Opponent	Result
Division III	First Round	Brevard	W 5–1
Division III	Second Round	Muhlenberg	W 5–2
Division III	Third Round	Kenyon	L 1–3

2023

Division	Round	Opponent	Result
Division III	First Round	Western Connecticut State	W 2–0
Division III	Second Round	SUNY Oneonta	W 2–1
Division III	Third Round	Tufts	W 1–0
Division III	Quarterfinals	Colorado College	T 0–0 (2OT) (Advances 5-4 on PK)
Division III	Semifinals	Amherst	T 2–2 (2OT) (Falls 0-2 on PK)

2024

Division	Round	Opponent	Result
Division III	First Round	Otterbein	W 1–0
Division III	Second Round	Johns Hopkins	T 1–1 (2OT) (Advances 4-2 on PK)
Division III	Third Round	Williams	T 1–1 (2OT) (Advances 4-3 on PK)
Division III	Quarterfinals	Dickinson	W 3–2
Division III	Semifinals	Connecticut College	L 0–1

2025

Division	Round	Opponent	Result
Division III	First Round	Denison	L 0–1

2026

Division	Round	Opponent	Result
Division III	First Round	Colorado College	W 5-2
Division III	Second Round	Rowan	L 0-1

=== Women's Soccer ===
2002

Division	Round	Opponent	Result
Division III	First Round	Greensboro	W 2–0
Division III	Round of 16	UT Dallas	L 0–1

2003

Division	Round	Opponent	Result
Division III	Round of 16	Greensboro	T 0–0 (2OT) (Advances 4-1 on PK)
Division III	Quarterfinals	Virginia Wesleyan	L 0–1 (2OT)

2002

Division	Round	Opponent	Result
Division III	First Round	Moravian	L 1–2 (2OT)

2006

Division	Round	Opponent	Result
Division III	First Round	Meredith	W 6–0
Division III	Second Round	Maryville (TN)	W 1–0
Division III	Round of 16	Washington St. Louis	W 2–1
Division III	Quarterfinals	Virginia Wesleyan	T 0–0 (2OT) (Falls 3-4 on PK)

2009

Division	Round	Opponent	Result
Division III	First Round	Christopher Newport	W 4–0
Division III	Second Round	Lynchburg	L 0–2

2016

Division	Round	Opponent	Result
Division III	First Round	Hardin–Simmons	L 0–3

2022

Division	Round	Opponent	Result
Division III	First Round	Centre	L 1–2

2023

Division	Round	Opponent	Result
Division III	First Round	Carnegie Mellon	L 0–1

2024

Division	Round	Opponent	Result
Division III	First Round	Farmingdale State	W 3–0
Division III	Second Round	Ohio Northern	W 2–0
Division III	Third Round	William Smith	L 0–2

2025

Division	Round	Opponent	Result
Division III	First Round	Marymount (VA)	W 3–0
Division III	Second Round	Carnegie Mellon	W 2-0
Division III	Third Round	Pomona-Pitzer	T 0-0 (2OT) (Falls 3-4 on PK)

2026

Division	Round	Opponent	Result
Division III	First Round	John Jay	W 4-0
Division III	Second Round	Emory	L 0-1

=== Men's Swimming ===
Appearances: 1975, 1976, 1977, 1978, 1979, 1980, 1981, 1982, 1983, 1984, 1985, 1986, 1987, 1988, 1989, 1990, 1991, 1992, 1993, 1995, 1996, 1997, 1998, 2000, 2001, 2002, 2003, 2004, 2005, 2006, 2007, 2008, 2009, 2012, 2013 2016, 2018, 2019, 2023, 2024, 2025, 2026

=== Women's Swimming ===
Appearances: 1989, 1990, 1993, 1994, 1995, 1996, 1997, 1999, 2009, 2016, 2017, 2018, 2019, 2022, 2024, 2025, 2026

=== Men's Tennis ===
1985

Division	Round	Opponent	Result
Division III	Quarterfinals	Swarthmore	L 3–6
Division III	Consolation	Claremont-Mudd-Scripps	L 4–5
Division III	Consolation	Gustavus Adolphus	L 3–6

1986

Division	Round	Opponent	Result
Division III	Quarterfinals	Washington St. Louis	W 8–0
Division III	Semifinals	Whitman	W 6–3
Division III	Championship	Kalamazoo	L 3–6

1987

Division	Round	Opponent	Result
Division III	Quarterfinals	Rochester (NY)	W 7–2
Division III	Semifinals	UC Santa Cruz	W 5–4
Division III	Championship	Kalamazoo	L 3–6

1988

Division	Round	Opponent	Result
Division III	Quarterfinals	Emory	W 5–2
Division III	Semifinals	Swarthmore	W 5–0
Division III	Championship	UC Santa Cruz	W 5–4

1989

Division	Round	Opponent	Result
Division III	Quarterfinals	Swarthmore	L 4–5
Division III	Consolation	Pomona–Pitzer	L 2–7
Division III	Consolation	UC San Diego	L 3–6

1991

Division	Round	Opponent	Result
Division III	First Round	Emory	W 5–4
Division III	Quarterfinals	Swarthmore	L 1–8
Division III	Consolation	UC San Diego	L 3–6
Division III	Consolation	Gustavus Adolphus	L 1–8

1996

Division	Round	Opponent	Result
Division III	First Round	Averett	L 2–5

1997

Division	Round	Opponent	Result
Division III	First Round	Salisbury	L 1–6

2001

Division	Round	Opponent	Result
Division III	First Round	Swarthmore	W 4–1
Division III	Second Round	Washington (MD)	L 0–4

2002

Division	Round	Opponent	Result
Division III	First Round	Mary Washington	W 5–1
Division III	Second Round	Washington (MD)	L 1–4

2003

Division	Round	Opponent	Result
Division III	First Round	Washington (MD)	L 2–4

2004

Division	Round	Opponent	Result
Division III	First Round	Piedmont	W 6–1
Division III	Second Round	Emory	L 2–5

2005

Division	Round	Opponent	Result
Division III	First Round	Carnegie Mellon	W 4–1
Division III	Second Round	Emory	L 0–4

2006

Division	Round	Opponent	Result
Division III	First Round	Sewanee	W 4–0
Division III	Second Round	Emory	L 0–4

2007

Division	Round	Opponent	Result
Division III	Second Round	Johns Hopkins	L 1–5

2008

Division	Round	Opponent	Result
Division III	First Round	Messiah	W 5–0
Division III	Second Round	Mary Washington	L 4–5

2010

Division	Round	Opponent	Result
Division III	First Round	TCNJ	W 5–3
Division III	Second Round	Emory	L 0–5

2011

Division	Round	Opponent	Result
Division III	Second Round	NC Wesleyan	L 1–5

2012

Division	Round	Opponent	Result
Division III	First Round	UT Tyler	W 5–3
Division III	Second Round	Emory	L 0–5

2013

Division	Round	Opponent	Result
Division III	First Round	NC Wesleyan	L 3–5

2014

Division	Round	Opponent	Result
Division III	First Round	Catholic	W 5–0
Division III	Second Round	Kenyon	L 1–5

2015

Division	Round	Opponent	Result
Division III	Second Round	NC Wesleyan	L 3–5

2016

Division	Round	Opponent	Result
Division III	First Round	NC Wesleyan	W 5–4
Division III	Second Round	Emory	L 0–5

2017

Division	Round	Opponent	Result
Division III	First Round	Sewanee	L 3–5

2018

Division	Round	Opponent	Result
Division III	First Round	Thomas More	W 5–0
Division III	Second Round	Emory	L 1–5

2019

Division	Round	Opponent	Result
Division III	Second Round	Emory	L 0–5

2021

Division	Round	Opponent	Result
Division III	Second Round	Rose–Hulman	W 5–1
Division III	Third Round	Williams	L 0–5

2022

Division	Round	Opponent	Result
Division III	First Round	UMass Boston	W 5–0
Division III	Second Round	Bowdoin	L 2–5

2023

Division	Round	Opponent	Result
Division III	Second Round	NC Wesleyan	L 1–5

2024

Division	Round	Opponent	Result
Division III	Second Round	Sewanee	L 2–5

2026

Division	Round	Opponent	Result
Division III	Second Round	Carnegie Mellon	L 0-4

=== Women's Tennis ===
1991

Division	Round	Opponent	Result
Division III	First Round	St. Thomas (MN)	L 3–6
Division III	Consolation	Vassar	L 4–5
Division III	11th Place Match	St. Olaf	L 2–7

1994

Division	Round	Opponent	Result
Division III	First Round	Williams	L 3–5
Division III	Consolation	UC Santa Cruz	W 6–3
Division III	5th Place Match	Emory	L 4–5

1995

Division	Round	Opponent	Result
Division III	First Round	Skidmore	W 8–1
Division III	Quarterfinals	Amherst	W 6–3
Division III	Semifinals	Kenyon	L 4–5
Division III	Consolation	Trinity (TX)	W 5–4

1996

Division	Round	Opponent	Result
Division III	First Round	Sewanee	W 5–0
Division III	Quarterfinals	Pomona–Pitzer	W 5–2
Division III	Semifinals	Trinity (TX)	W 5–2
Division III	Championship	Emory	L 1–5

1997

Division	Round	Opponent	Result
Division III	First Round	Pomona–Pitzer	W 8–1
Division III	Quarterfinals	Gustavus Adolphus	W 6–3
Division III	Semifinals	Kenyon	L 3–6
Division III	Championship	Emory	L 4–5

1998

Division	Round	Opponent	Result
Division III	First Round	Williams	W 5–3
Division III	Quarterfinals	Gustavus Adolphus	L 3–6

1999

Division	Round	Opponent	Result
Division III	First Round	Kenyon	W 5–4
Division III	Quarterfinals	Trinity (TX)	L 2–7

2000

Division	Round	Opponent	Result
Division III	Second Round	Rhodes	W 8–1
Division III	Quarterfinals	Kenyon	W 6–3
Division III	Semifinals	Trinity (TX)	L 3–6
Division III	Consolation	Amherst	W 5–4

2001

Division	Round	Opponent	Result
Division III	First Round	Salisbury	W 8–1
Division III	Second Round	Mary Washington	W 8–1
Division III	Quarterfinals	Trinity (TX)	L 2–7

2002

Division	Round	Opponent	Result
Division III	First Round	Mary Washington	W 9–0
Division III	Second Round	Salisbury	W 9–0
Division III	Quarterfinals	Pomona–Pitzer	W 5–4
Division III	Semifinals	Emory	L 4–5
Division III	Consolation	Trinity (TX)	W 5–4

2003

Division	Round	Opponent	Result
Division III	First Round	Salisbury	W 9–0
Division III	Second Round	Swarthmore	W 8–1
Division III	Quarterfinals	Pomona–Pitzer	W 8–1
Division III	Semifinals	Amherst	W 7–2
Division III	Championship	Emory	L 1–5

2004

Division	Round	Opponent	Result
Division III	First Round	Mary Washington	W 7–0
Division III	Second Round	Swarthmore	W 7–2
Division III	Quarterfinals	Gustavus Adolphus	W 5–3
Division III	Semifinals	Emory	L 0–5
Division III	Consolation	Williams	L 4–5

2005

Division	Round	Opponent	Result
Division III	First Round	Swarthmore	W 5–0
Division III	Second Round	Carnegie Mellon	W 5–0
Division III	Quarterfinals	Denison	W 5–1
Division III	Semifinals	Middlebury	W 5–3
Division III	Championship	Emory	L 3–5

2006

Division	Round	Opponent	Result
Division III	First Round	Mary Washington	W 5–0
Division III	Second Round	Carnegie Mellon	W 5–0
Division III	Quarterfinals	Williams	W 5–0
Division III	Semifinals	Claremont-Mudd-Scripps	W 5–1
Division III	Championship	Emory	L 1–5

2007

Division	Round	Opponent	Result
Division III	First Round	Sawrthmore	W 5–0
Division III	Second Round	Mary Washington	W 5–0
Division III	Quarterfinals	Middlebury	W 5–0
Division III	Semifinals	Williams	W 5–0
Division III	Championship	Amherst	W 5–2

2008

Division	Round	Opponent	Result
Division III	First Round	Hunter	W 5–0
Division III	Second Round	Carnegie Mellon	W 5–2
Division III	Quarterfinals	Gustavus Adolphus	W 5–3
Division III	Semifinals	Denison	W 5–1
Division III	Championship	Williams	L 4–5

2009

Division	Round	Opponent	Result
Division III	Second Round	Meredith	W 5–0
Division III	Third Round	Emory	L 2–5

2010

Division	Round	Opponent	Result
Division III	Second Round	Meredith	W 5–0
Division III	Third Round	Emory	L 0–5

2011

Division	Round	Opponent	Result
Division III	Second Round	Wilkes	W 5–0
Division III	Third Round	Carnegie Mellon	W 5–4
Division III	Quarterfinals	Emory	L 0–5

2012

Division	Round	Opponent	Result
Division III	Second Round	Ohio Northern	W 5–0
Division III	Third Round	Emory	L 2–5

2013

Division	Round	Opponent	Result
Division III	Second Round	Methodist	W 5–0
Division III	Third Round	Sewanee	L 4–5

2014

Division	Round	Opponent	Result
Division III	Second Round	Sewanee	W 5–0
Division III	Third Round	Emory	L 1–5

2015

Division	Round	Opponent	Result
Division III	Second Round	NC Wesleyan	W 5–0
Division III	Third Round	MIT	L 3–5

2016

Division	Round	Opponent	Result
Division III	Second Round	Westminster (PA)	W 5–0
Division III	Third Round	Emory	L 0–5

2017

Division	Round	Opponent	Result
Division III	Second Round	Sewanee	W 5–3
Division III	Third Round	Emory	L 1–5

2018

Division	Round	Opponent	Result
Division III	Second Round	Franciscan	W 5–0
Division III	Third Round	Mary Washington	L 4–5

2019

Division	Round	Opponent	Result
Division III	Second Round	Sewanee	W 5–4
Division III	Third Round	Emory	L 0–5

2021

Division	Round	Opponent	Result
Division III	Second Round	TCNJ	W 5–1
Division III	Third Round	Denison	W 5–2
Division III	Quarterfinals	Wesleyan (CT)	L 0–5

2022

Division	Round	Opponent	Result
Division III	First Round	St. Mary's (MD)	W 5–0
Division III	Second Round	Mary Washington	L 1–5

2023

Division	Round	Opponent	Result
Division III	First Round	NC Wesleyan	W 5–2
Division III	Second Round	Emory	L 1–5

2024

Division	Round	Opponent	Result
Division III	Second Round	UT Dallas	W 5–0
Division III	Third Round	Johns Hopkins	L 0–5

2025

Division	Round	Opponent	Result
Division III	Second Round	Swarthmore	W 4–3
Division III	Third Round	Emory	L 0–4

2026

Division	Round	Opponent	Result
Division III	Second Round	Trinity (TX)	W 4-1
Division III	Third Round	Emory	W 4-3
Division III	Quarterfinals	Wesleyan (CT)	L 0-4

=== Men's Indoor Track & Field ===
Appearances: 2014, 2015

=== Women's Indoor Track & Field ===
Appearances: 2009, 2015, 2016, 2022

=== Men's Outdoor Track & Field ===
Appearances: 2014

=== Women's Outdoor Track & Field ===
Appearances: 2008, 2009, 2014

=== Volleyball ===
1999

Division	Round	Opponent	Result
Division III	First Round	SCAD	L 2–3

2001

Division	Round	Opponent	Result
Division III	First Round	Christopher Newport	W 3–0
Division III	Second Round	Emory	L 0–3

2002

Division	Round	Opponent	Result
Division III	First Round	Christopher Newport	W 3–1
Division III	Second Round	Trinity (TX)	L 0–3

2003

Division	Round	Opponent	Result
Division III	First Round	Averett	W 3–1
Division III	Second Round	Emory	L 0–3

2004

Division	Round	Opponent	Result
Division III	First Round	Maryville (TN)	W 3–0
Division III	Second Round	Emory	L 1–3

2005

Division	Round	Opponent	Result
Division III	First Round	Southwestern (TX)	L 0–3

2006

Division	Round	Opponent	Result
Division III	First Round	Vassar	W 3–1
Division III	Second Round	NYU	W 3–2
Division III	Regional Championship	Stevens	L 1–3

2007

Division	Round	Opponent	Result
Division III	First Round	Southwestern (TX)	L 0–3

2008

Division	Round	Opponent	Result
Division III	First Round	Mount St. Joseph	L 0–3

2010

Division	Round	Opponent	Result
Division III	First Round	Mount St. Joseph	W 3–1
Division III	Second Round	Emory	L 1–3

2012

Division	Round	Opponent	Result
Division III	First Round	Christopher Newport	L 0–3

2013

Division	Round	Opponent	Result
Division III	First Round	Berry	L 0–3

2014

Division	Round	Opponent	Result
Division III	First Round	Mount Union	L 0–3

2018

Division	Round	Opponent	Result
Division III	First Round	Colorado College	L 2–3

2021

Division	Round	Opponent	Result
Division III	First Round	Southwestern (TX)	L 1–3

2023

Division	Round	Opponent	Result
Division III	First Round	Berry	L 1–3

2024

Division	Round	Opponent	Result
Division III	First Round	John Jay	W 3–0
Division III	Second Round	Stevens	W 3–1
Division III	Regional Championship	Christopher Newport	W 3–0
Division III	National Quarterfinals	Hope	L 0–3

2025

Division	Round	Opponent	Result
Division III	First Round	Berry	L 0-3

2026

Division	Round	Opponent	Result
Division III	First Round	Covenant	W 3-2
Division III	Second Round	Juniata	TBD

=== Wrestling ===
Appearances: 1936, 1975, 1977, 1978, 1986, 1987, 1989, 2017, 2022, 2023, 2024, 2025, 2026

== Rivalries ==
Washington and Lee and Roanoke College have been rivals since the 1870's. The rivalry is fueled by a long history of competition; conference affiliation, and geography also plays a role in this rivalry as both schools are charter members of the Old Dominion Athletic Conference and are located about 50 miles from each other along Interstate 81. Both schools historically have had nationally ranked men's lacrosse teams and have been ranked in the top twenty when meeting each other toward the end of the regular season. In addition to men's lacrosse, women's lacrosse games with Roanoke has drawn much interest as both schools have had highly successful programs and have competed against each other in the ODAC Championship game multiple times. Other rivalries inside the Old Dominion Athletic Conference include Bridgewater, Lynchburg, Hampden-Sydney, and Randolph-Macon. Outside the ODAC, Washington and Lee has a rivalry with Christopher Newport where the two schools have competed against each other numerous times in different sports during the regular season and NCAA tournaments and their men's lacrosse teams play against each other for the Virginia LtN Cup. Washington and Lee had a historic rivalry with VMI dating back to their days as a Division I school.
