= Cornell Big Red men's lacrosse =

- Founded: 1865; 161 years ago
- University: Cornell University
- Head coach: Connor Buczek
- Stadium: Schoellkopf Field (capacity: 21,500)
- Location: Ithaca, New York, U.S.
- Conference: Ivy League
- Nickname: Big Red
- Colors: Carnelian red and white

Pre-NCAA era championships
- 1902, 1903, 1907, 1914, 1916

NCAA Tournament championships
- 1971, 1976, 1977, 2025

NCAA Tournament Runner-Up
- 1978, 1987, 1988, 2009, 2022

NCAA Tournament Final Fours
- 1971, 1974, 1975, 1976, 1977, 1978, 1982, 1987, 1988, 2007, 2009, 2010, 2013, 2022, 2025

NCAA Tournament Quarterfinals
- 1971, 1974, 1975, 1976, 1977, 1978, 1979, 1980, 1982, 1983, 1987, 1988, 2002, 2004, 2005, 2007, 2009, 2010, 2011, 2013, 2018, 2022, 2025

NCAA Tournament appearances
- 1971, 1974, 1975, 1976, 1977, 1978, 1979, 1980, 1982, 1983, 1987, 1988, 1989, 1995, 2000, 2002, 2004, 2005, 2006, 2007, 2008, 2009, 2010, 2011, 2013, 2014, 2015, 2018, 2022, 2023, 2025, 2026

Conference Tournament championships
- 2011, 2018, 2025

Conference regular season championships
- 1966, 1968, 1969, 1970, 1971, 1972, 1974, 1975, 1976, 1977, 1978, 1979, 1980, 1981, 1982, 1983, 1987, 2003, 2004, 2005, 2006, 2007, 2008, 2009, 2010, 2011, 2013, 2014, 2015, 2022, 2023, 2024, 2025, 2026

The Cornell Big Red men's lacrosse team represents Cornell University in NCAA Division I men's lacrosse. The Big Red have won four NCAA national championships and currently compete as a member of the Ivy League. Cornell plays its games at Schoellkopf Field in Ithaca, New York. Three Cornell men have won college lacrosse's highest honor, the Tewaaraton Award: Max Seibald in 2009, Rob Pannell in 2013, and CJ Kirst in 2025.

== History ==
As a member of the Ivy League, Cornell has won 34 conference championships (21 outright, 13 shared), more than any other school. Princeton, with 28 conference championships (18 outright, 10 shared) is second. The Ivy League awards the conference championship to the team with the best record at the conclusion of the regular season. If two or more teams are tied with the same record the championship is shared.

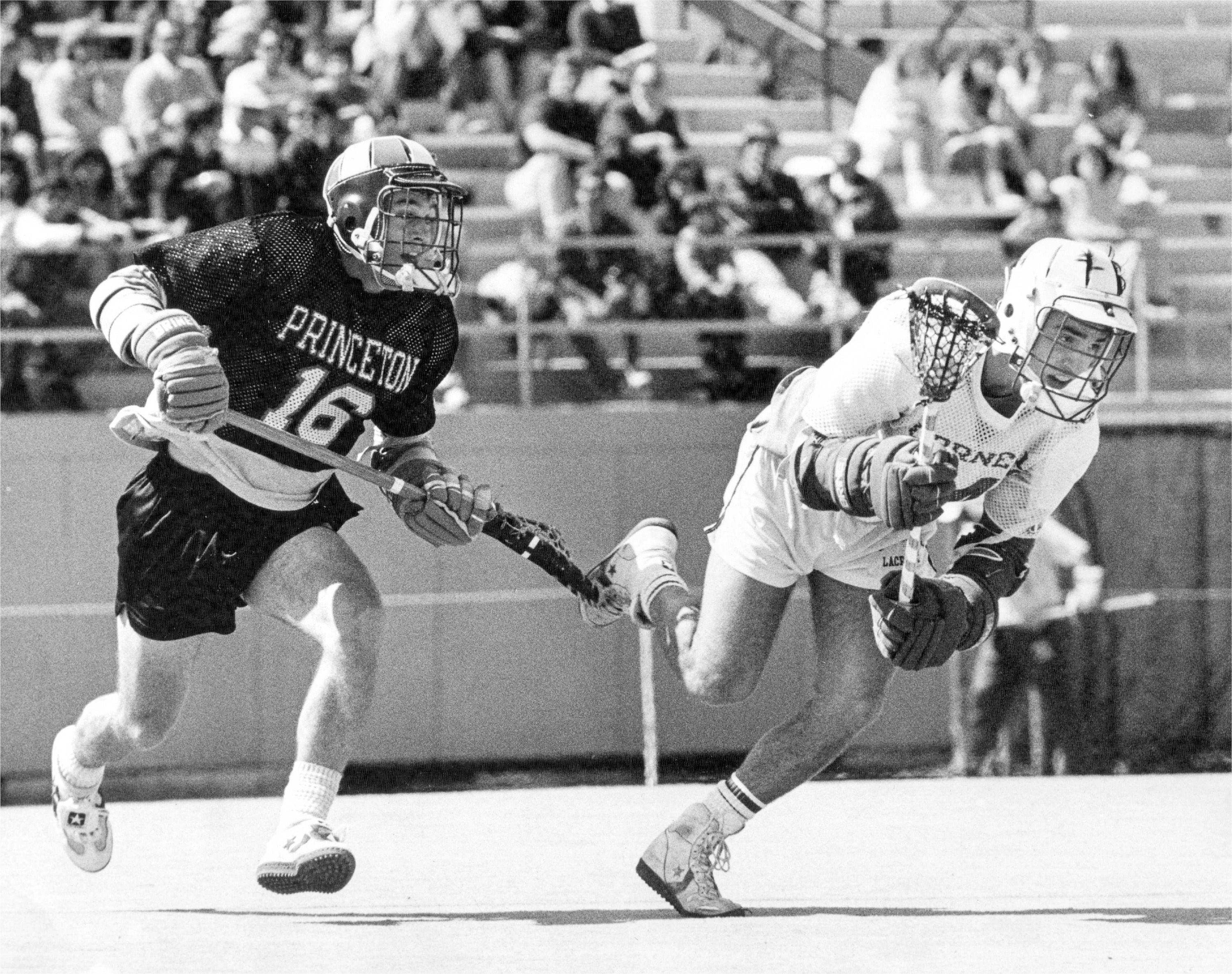
Cornell vs. Princeton in 1987

The Cornell team was undefeated and untied in league play during 18 of their 21 outright championships, the most of any Ivy League team.

Since the introduction of the Ivy League lacrosse tournament in 2010, Cornell has won the tournament three times, in 2011, 2018, and 2025. The Big Red have appeared in the NCAA lacrosse tournament 31 times.

Cornell has won four NCAA championships, the most recent being in 2025 when they defeated Maryland 13–10. It was their first NCAA championship in 48 years, after five runner up finishes beginning in 1978.

Cornell maintains the oldest ongoing rivalry in college lacrosse with the Hobart College Statesmen. Their main Ivy League rivalry is with Princeton.

Cornell has claimed four NCAA national championships and four pre-NCAA era titles. Some of the all-time great lacrosse players and coaches have played for or coached the Big Red, including Mike French, Eamon McEneaney, CJ Kirst, and Richie Moran.

Cornell played their first official season of lacrosse in 1892 and have a record of 826-502-27 (.619) following the 2025 season.

In 2009, Max Seibald won the Tewaaraton Award, awarded to the "Most Outstanding" collegiate lacrosse player in the United States.

In 2013, Rob Pannell won the Tewaaraton Award while leading Cornell to the NCAA semifinals, also breaking the all-time career scoring mark that season.

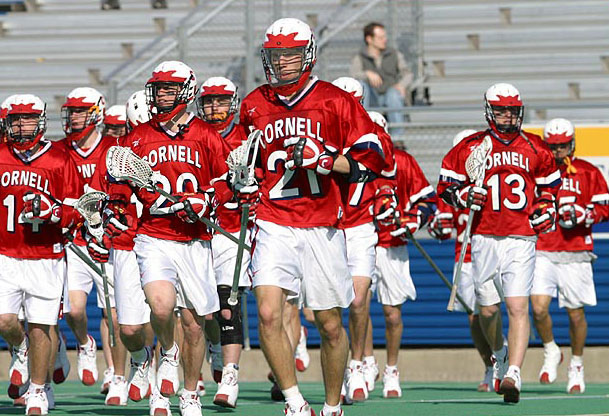
The 2004 Cornell lacrosse team

Eamon McEneaney is one of the top all-time college lacrosse players. McEneaney teamed with Hall of Fame players Mike French, Dan Mackesey, Bill Marino, Bob Hendrickson, and Chris Kane, and coach Richie Moran to lead the Cornell Big Red to the NCAA Men's Lacrosse Championship in 1976 and 1977. His top season was 1975 when he scored 31 goals and handed out 65 assists for 96 total points in 17 games, and was named the USILA player of the year. That year, he was also awarded the Turnbull Award given to the top collegiate attackman. His career was played in an era when freshmen were not eligible to play varsity sports. McEneaney was also an outstanding football player, playing wide receiver. He was named to the All-Ivy second team in 1976, when he led Cornell in receiving and was second in team scoring. He was voted the outstanding player in the 1977 NCAA Championship game and represented the United States in the 1978 World Lacrosse Championships. McEneaney was inducted into the Cornell Sports Hall of Fame in 1982 and was inducted into the National Lacrosse Hall of Fame in 1992. In 1995, he was named to the NCAA's Silver Anniversary Lacrosse Team, recognizing his place among the best players of the first quarter century of NCAA lacrosse. McEneaney's jersey number (#10) was retired by Cornell University on April 27, 2002, in memoriam.

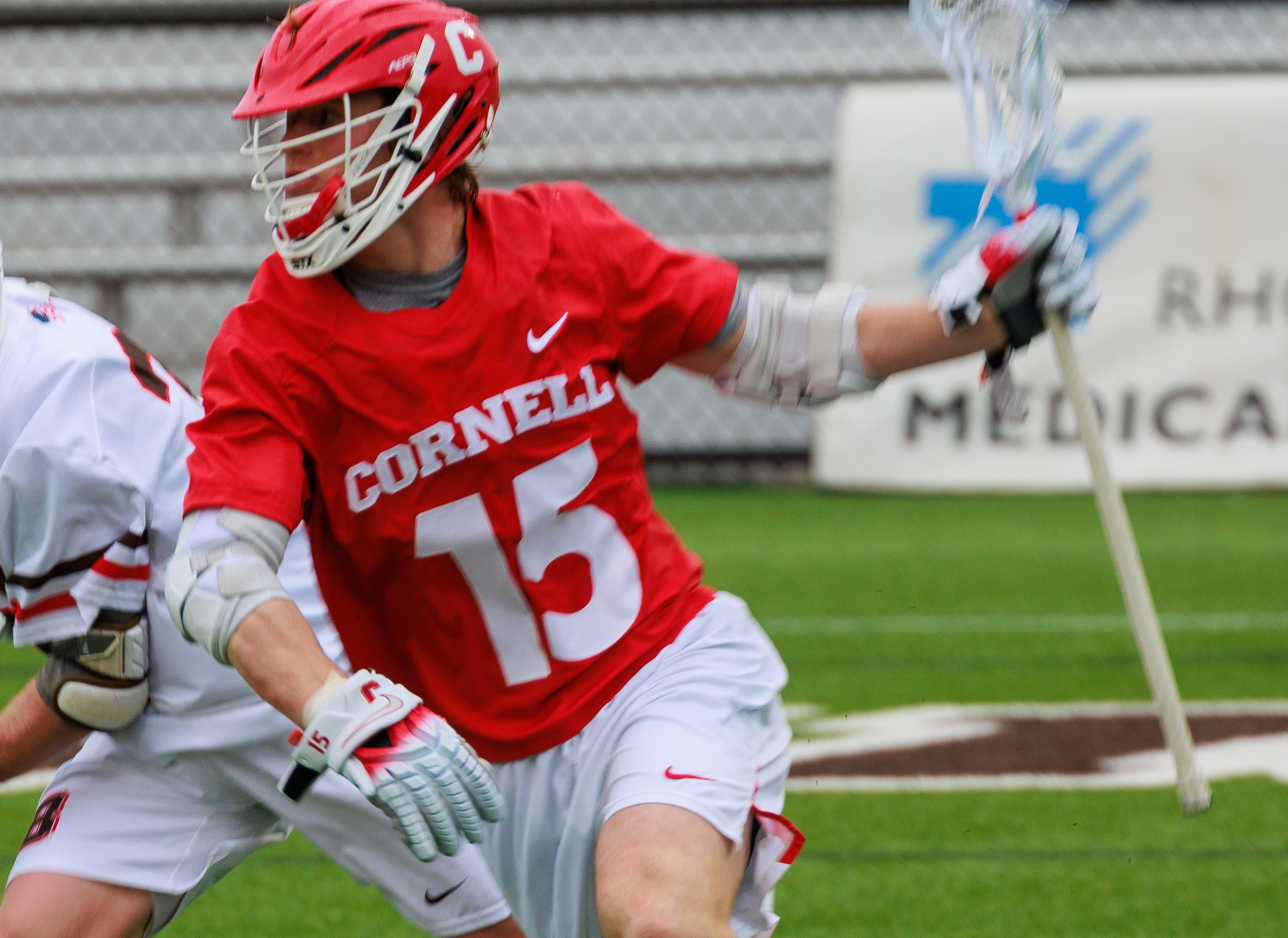
CJ Kirst in a regular season game against Brown in 2025

In April 2025, senior CJ Kirst became the NCAA Division I men’s lacrosse all-time leading goal scorer, bringing Cornell the Ivy League regular season title in a game against Dartmouth. Kirst finished his collegiate career with 247 career goals and tied the single season scoring record with 82 goals. Kirst was also unanimously selected as Attackman of the Year in 2025. In May 2025, Kirst became the third Cornellian (and fifth Ivy League student-athlete) to earn the Tewaaraton Award, days after leading his team to its first NCAA title since 1977.

== Head coaches ==
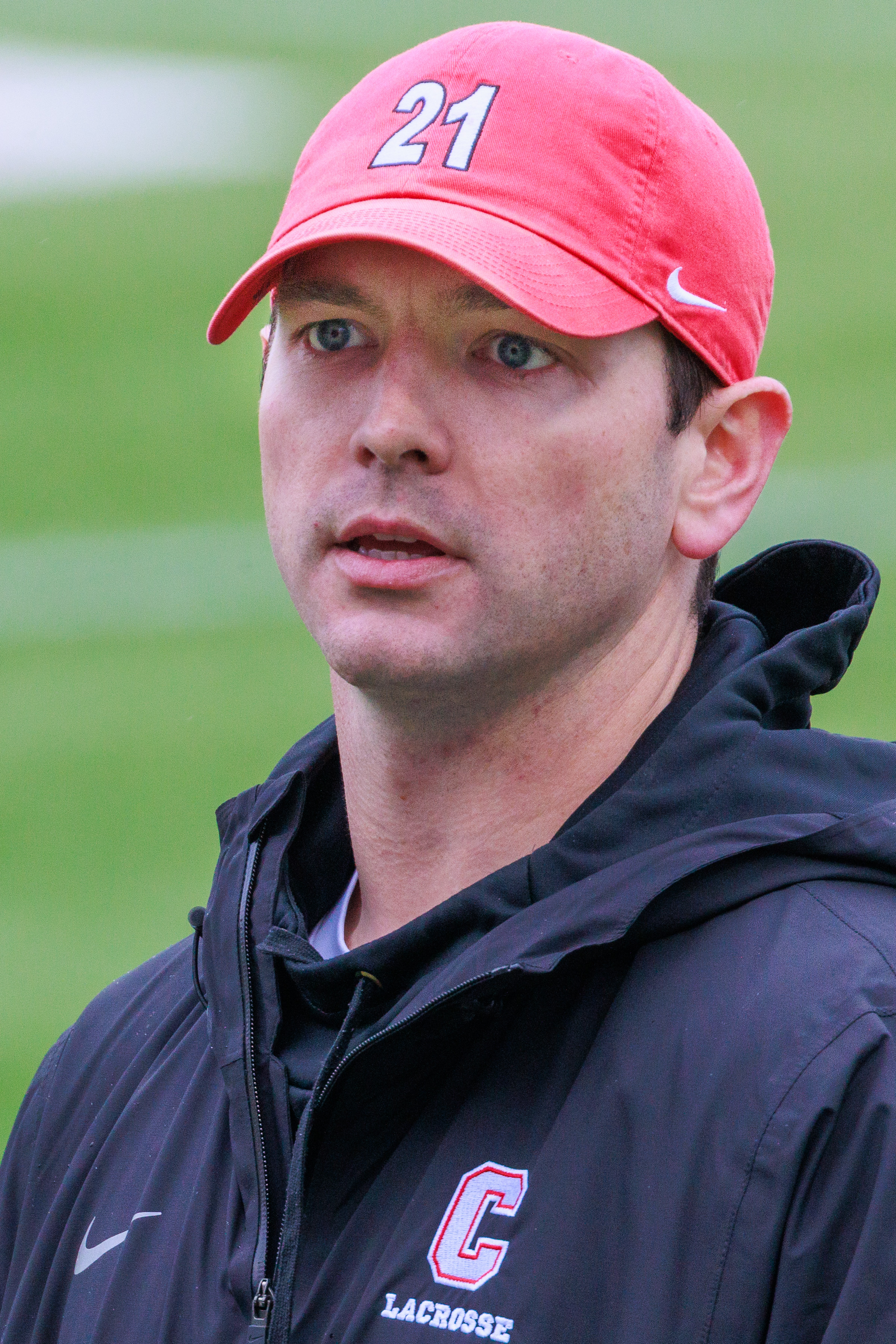
Head coach Connor Buczek in 2025

Cornell has had thirteen men's lacrosse head coaches since 1892:

- No Head Coach (1892-1914), 69-65-12, .514 winning percentage
- Talbot Hunter (1915-1916), 7-8-1 record, .469 winning percentage
- Nicholas Bawlf (1920-1939), 62-63-11 record, .496 winning percentage
- Ray Van Orman (1940–1949), 24-45 record, .348 winning percentage
- Ross H. Smith (1950-1961), 75-56-3 record, .571 winning percentage
- Robert Cullen (1962-1965), 16-24 record, .400 winning percentage
- Ned Harkness (1966-1968), 35-1 record, .972 winning percentage
- Richie Moran (1969-1997), 257-121 record, .680 winning percentage
- Dave Pietramala (1998-2000), 23-17 record, .576 winning percentage
- Jeff Tambroni (2001-2010), 109-40 record, .732 winning percentage
- Ben DeLuca (2011-2014), 37-10 record, .787 winning percentage
- Matt Kerwick (2014-2017), 32-26 record, .552 winning percentage
- Peter Milliman (2018-2020), 28-10 record, .737 winning percentage
- Connor Buczek (2021–Present), 52-15 record, .776 winning percentage, as of the 2025 season

As of the 2025 season, the program has a record of 826-502-27, which is a .620 winning percentage, with 4 NCAA titles.

== Season results ==
The following is a list of Cornell's results by season:

Season	Coach	Overall	Conference	Standing	Postseason
No Head Coach (Independent) (1892–1914)
1892	No Head Coach	0–1			
1893	No Head Coach	1–3			
1894	No Head Coach	2–1			
1895	No Head Coach	1–4			
1896	No Head Coach	No Season Held			
1897	No Head Coach	No Season Held			
1898	No Head Coach	1–4			
1899	No Head Coach	4–3–2			
1900	No Head Coach	3–4			
1901	No Head Coach	4–3			
1902	No Head Coach	4–2			Intercollegiate Champion
1903	No Head Coach	2–4–1			Intercollegiate Champion
1904	No Head Coach	6–4–1			
1905	No Head Coach	4–5–1			
1906	No Head Coach	3–4–2			
1907	No Head Coach	7–0			Intercollegiate Champion
1908	No Head Coach	3–1–1			
1909	No Head Coach	2–3			
1910	No Head Coach	5–2			
1911	No Head Coach	2–7			
1912	No Head Coach	4–3–1			
1913	No Head Coach	5–3–1			
1914	No Head Coach	6–2–2			Co-Intercollegiate Champion
No Head Coach:		69–65–12 (.514)			
Talbot Hunter (Independent) (1915–1916)
1915	Talbot Hunter	1–5–1			
1916	Talbot Hunter	5–3			Co-Intercollegiate Champion
1917	Talbot Hunter	No Season Held			
1918	Talbot Hunter	No Season Held			
1919	Talbot Hunter	No Season Held			
Talbot Hunter:		7–8–1 (.469)			
Nicholas Bawlf (Independent) (1920–1939)
1920	Nicholas Bawlf	6–2–1			
1921	Nicholas Bawlf	4–5–1			
1922	Nicholas Bawlf	4–4–1			
1923	Nicholas Bawlf	6–2			
1924	Nicholas Bawlf	3–2			
1925	Nicholas Bawlf	3–4			
1926	Nicholas Bawlf	5–2			
1927	Nicholas Bawlf	4–2			
1928	Nicholas Bawlf	2–3–1			
1929	Nicholas Bawlf	1–5–1			
1930	Nicholas Bawlf	4–1–3			
1931	Nicholas Bawlf	2–2–1			
1932	Nicholas Bawlf	4–1			
1933	Nicholas Bawlf	6–1–1			
1934	Nicholas Bawlf	2–4			
1935	Nicholas Bawlf	0–5			
1936	Nicholas Bawlf	1–5			
1937	Nicholas Bawlf	1–4			
1938	Nicholas Bawlf	3–4			
1939	Nicholas Bawlf	1–5–1			
Nicholas Bawlf:		62–63–11 (.496)			
Ray Van Orman (Independent) (1940–1949)
1940	Ray Van Orman	2–6			
1941	Ray Van Orman	1–5			
1942	Ray Van Orman	2–4			
1943	Ray Van Orman	2–2			
1944	Ray Van Orman	4–1			
1945	Ray Van Orman	1–4			
1946	Ray Van Orman	1–8			
1947	Ray Van Orman	3–4			
1948	Ray Van Orman	3–5			
1949	Ray Van Orman	5–6			
Ray Van Orman:		24–45 (.348)			
Ross H. Smith (Independent) (1950–1955)
1950	Ross H. Smith	3–6			
1951	Ross H. Smith	3–9			
1952	Ross H. Smith	4–7			
1953	Ross H. Smith	7–5			
1954	Ross H. Smith	9–3			
1955	Ross H. Smith	8–3–1			
Ross H. Smith (Ivy League) (1956–1961)
1956	Ross H. Smith	5–7	2–3	4th	
1957	Ross H. Smith	6–5	2–3	4th	
1958	Ross H. Smith	9–1–1	4–1	2nd	
1959	Ross H. Smith	9–2	4–1	2nd	
1960	Ross H. Smith	8–3	3–2	3rd	
1961	Ross H. Smith	4–5–1	0–4–1	6th	
Ross H. Smith:		75–56–3 (.571)			
Robert Cullen (Ivy League) (1962–1965)
1962	Robert Cullen	4–4	3–2	T-2nd	
1963	Robert Cullen	5–6	2–3	4th	
1964	Robert Cullen	3–7	1–5	7th	
1965	Robert Cullen	4–7	2–4	T-4th	
Robert Cullen:		16–24 (.400)			
Ned Harkness (Ivy League) (1966–1969)
1966	Ned Harkness	12–0	6–0	1st	
1967	Ned Harkness	11–1	5–1	2nd	
1968	Ned Harkness	12–0	6–0	1st	
Ned Harkness:		35–1 (.972)			
Richie Moran (Ivy League) (1969–1997)
1969	Richie Moran	8–3	4–2	T-1st	
1970	Richie Moran	11–0	6–0	1st	
1971	Richie Moran	13–1	6–0	1st	NCAA Division I Champion
1972	Richie Moran	10–3	6–0	1st	
1973	Richie Moran	8–3	5–1	2nd	
1974	Richie Moran	12–2	6–0	1st	NCAA Division I Final Four
1975	Richie Moran	15–2	6–0	1st	NCAA Division I Final Four
1976	Richie Moran	16–0	6–0	1st	NCAA Division I Champion
1977	Richie Moran	13–0	6–0	1st	NCAA Division I Champion
1978	Richie Moran	13–1	6–0	1st	NCAA Division I Runner-Up
1979	Richie Moran	10–3	5–1	1st	NCAA Division I Quarterfinals
1980	Richie Moran	8–5	5–1	T–1st	NCAA Division I Quarterfinals
1981	Richie Moran	8–4	6–0	1st	
1982	Richie Moran	11–2	6–0	1st	NCAA Division I Final Four
1983	Richie Moran	8–4	5–1	T–1st	NCAA Division I Quarterfinals
1984	Richie Moran	6–6	4–2	T–2nd	
1985	Richie Moran	8–4	4–2	T–2nd	
1986	Richie Moran	7–6	4–2	T–2nd	
1987	Richie Moran	13–1	6–0	1st	NCAA Division I Runner-Up
1988	Richie Moran	9–6	3–3	T–4th	NCAA Division I Runner-Up
1989	Richie Moran	9–4	4–2	T–2nd	NCAA Division I First Round
1990	Richie Moran	7–6	2–4	T–5th	
1991	Richie Moran	8–5	2–4	T–5th	
1992	Richie Moran	7–5	3–3	4th	
1993	Richie Moran	4–7	3–3	T–3rd	
1994	Richie Moran	1–10	0–6	7th	
1995	Richie Moran	8–6	3–3	4th	NCAA Division I First Round
1996	Richie Moran	3–11	1–5	6th	
1997	Richie Moran	3–11	1–5	T–6th	
Richie Moran:		257–121 (.680)	124–50 (.713)		
Dave Pietramala (Ivy League) (1998–2000)
1998	Dave Pietramala	6–7	4–2	3rd	
1999	Dave Pietramala	7–6	4–2	T–2nd	
2000	Dave Pietramala	10–4	5–1	2nd	NCAA Division I First Round
Dave Pietramala:		23–17 (.575)	13–5 (.722)		
Jeff Tambroni (Ivy League) (2001–2010)
2001	Jeff Tambroni	7–6	4–2	2nd	
2002	Jeff Tambroni	11–4	4–2	T–2nd	NCAA Division I Quarterfinals
2003	Jeff Tambroni	9–4	5–1	T–1st	
2004	Jeff Tambroni	9–5	5–1	T–1st	NCAA Division I Quarterfinals
2005	Jeff Tambroni	11–3	6–0	1st	NCAA Division I Quarterfinals
2006	Jeff Tambroni	11–3	5–1	T–1st	NCAA Division I First Round
2007	Jeff Tambroni	15–1	6–0	1st	NCAA Division I Final Four
2008	Jeff Tambroni	11–4	5–1	T–1st	NCAA Division I First Round
2009	Jeff Tambroni	13–4	5–1	T–1st	NCAA Division I Runner-Up
2010	Jeff Tambroni	12–6	4–2	T–1st	NCAA Division I Final Four
Jeff Tambroni:		109–40 (.732)	49–11 (.817)		
Ben DeLuca (Ivy League) (2011–2013)
2011	Ben DeLuca	14–3	6–0	1st	NCAA Division I Quarterfinals
2012	Ben DeLuca	9–4	4–2	T–2nd	
2013	Ben DeLuca	14–4	6–0	1st	NCAA Division I Final Four
Ben DeLuca:		37–11 (.771)	16–2 (.889)		
Matt Kerwick (Ivy League) (2014–2017)
2014	Matt Kerwick	11–5	5–1	T–1st	NCAA Division I First Round
2015	Matt Kerwick	10–6	4–2	T–1st	NCAA Division I First Round
2016	Matt Kerwick	6–7	1–5	6th	
2017	Matt Kerwick	5–8	3–3	T–4th	
Matt Kerwick:		32–26 (.552)	13–11 (.542)		
Peter Milliman (Ivy League) (2018–2020)
2018	Pete Milliman	13–5	4–2	2nd	NCAA Division I Quarterfinals
2019	Pete Milliman	10–5	4–2	3rd	
2020	Pete Milliman	5–0	0–0	†	†
Pete Milliman:		28–10 (.737)	8–4 (.667)		
Connor Buczek (Ivy League) (2021–present)
2021	Connor Buczek	0–0	0–0	††	††
2022	Connor Buczek	14–5	4–2	T–1st	NCAA Division I Runner-up
2023	Connor Buczek	11–4	5–1	1st	NCAA Division I First Round
2024	Connor Buczek	9–5	5–1	1st	
2025	Connor Buczek	18–1	6–0	1st	NCAA Division I Champion
2026	Connor Buczek	11–5	5–1	T–1st	NCAA Division I First Round
Connor Buczek:		63–20 (.759)	25–5 (.833)		
Total:		837–506–27 (.621)			
National champion Postseason invitational champion Conference regular season champion Conference regular season and conference tournament champion Division regular season champion Division regular season and conference tournament champion Conference tournament champion

† NCAA cancelled 2020 collegiate activities due to the COVID-19 virus. †† Ivy League cancelled 2021 collegiate season due to the COVID-19 virus.
