= 1978 NCAA Division I lacrosse tournament =

1978 NCAA Division I men's lacrosse tournament
- Dates: May 17–27, 1978
- Teams: 8
- Finals site: Rutgers Stadium, Piscataway, New Jersey
- Champions: Johns Hopkins (2nd title)
- Runner-up: Cornell (4th title game)
- Semifinalists: Maryland (8th Final Four); Navy (5th Final Four)
- Winning coach: Henry Ciccarone (1st title)
- MOP: Mike O’Neill, Johns Hopkins
- Attendance: 13,527 finals 28,587 total
- Top scorer: Mike O’Neill, Johns Hopkins (15 goals)

The 1978 NCAA Division I lacrosse tournament was the eighth annual tournament hosted by the National Collegiate Athletic Association to determine the team champion of men's college lacrosse among its Division I programs at the end of the 1978 NCAA Division I lacrosse season.

Johns Hopkins defeated Cornell in the championship game, 13–8, using a three-goal performance by midfielder Bob DeSimone. This was the Blue Jays' second national title. Before this loss, Cornell had come into the game on a 42-game unbeaten streak and had not lost a game since May 24, 1975, a 15–12 setback to Navy in the 1975 NCAA tournament semifinals.

The championship game was hosted at Rutgers Stadium on the campus of Rutgers University in Piscataway, New Jersey. The game grew a crowd of 13,527 fans.

== Overview ==
Twelve NCAA Division I college men's lacrosse teams met after having played their way through a regular season, and for some, a conference tournament.

The finals was a showdown of the #1 and #2 ranked teams, with Johns Hopkins lone loss coming on April 15 to Cornell (16–11) at Homewood Field in Baltimore. Up until this game, Hopkins had lost only three games in the prior two seasons, all losses to Cornell.

Before their finals loss, Cornell set the NCAA consecutive victories record of 42 games, not losing a game from March 20, 1976, to May 20, 1978. During this win streak, Cornell was 16-0 in 1976, 13-0 in 1977 and 13-1 in 1978. This was the first game since 1975 in which Cornell had been limited to less than 10 goals.

Mike O'Neill, attackman from Johns Hopkins, was later named the Division 1 National Player of the Year and was named the tournament outstanding player, finishing with one goal and three assists in the finals. Johns Hopkins would go on to win three straight national titles and appear in an unprecedented nine straight NCAA finals, from 1977 through 1985, finishing with five national titles against four losses during that stretch. Ned Radebaugh dominated at face off winning 20 of 22 draws, with Radebaugh's dominance contributing to the NCAA's decision for the 1979 season to eliminate faceoffs.

== Bracket ==
Quarterfinals; May 17
1	Cornell	12
8	Washington and Lee	2
4	Navy	16
5	Army	13
3	Maryland	15
6	Virginia	10
2	Johns Hopkins	20
7	Hofstra	8

Semifinals; May 20
1	Cornell	13
4	Navy	7
3	Maryland	11
2	Johns Hopkins	17

Championship; May 27
1	Cornell (13–1)	8
2	Johns Hopkins (13–1)	13

== Box scores ==
=== Finals ===
Team	1	2	3	4	Total
Johns Hopkins (13–1)	2	5	2	4	13
Cornell (13–1)	2	3	2	1	8
Johns Hopkins scoring – Bob DeSimone 3, Wayne Davis 2, Scott Baugher 2, Jim Bidne 2, Dave Huntley, Joe Devlin, Mike O’Neill, Frank Cutrone; Cornell scoring – Bob Henrickson 3, Steve Page 2, Keith Reitenbach, Tom Marino, John Sierra; Shots: Cornell 41, Johns Hopkins 48; Saves: Cornell - John Griffin 17, Johns Hopkins - Mike Federico 11

=== Semifinals ===
Team	1	2	3	4	Total
Johns Hopkins	2	7	5	3	17
Maryland	4	3	3	1	11
Johns Hopkins scoring – Mike O’Neill 4, Dave Huntley 4, Bob DeSimone 3, Joe Devlin 3, Jim Zaffuto 2, Scott Baugher; Maryland scoring – John Lamon 4, Barry Mitchell 2, Terry Kimball 2, Bob Ott, Bob Boneillo, Rich Moyer; Shots: Johns Hopkins 56, Maryland 47

Team	1	2	3	4	Total
Cornell	5	2	3	3	13
Navy	1	2	2	2	7
Cornell scoring – Tom Marino 4, Steve Page 3, Bob Henrickson 3, Ned Gerber 2, John Sierra; Navy scoring – Mike Hannan 3, Mike Buzzell, Brendan Schneck, Jim Shulson, John Holmes; Shots: Cornell 44, Navy 34

=== Quarterfinals ===
Team	1	2	3	4	Total
Cornell	4	4	1	3	12
Washington and Lee	0	0	1	1	2
Cornell scoring – Steve Page 2, Bob Henrickson 2, Tom Marino 2, Charlie Wood 2, Craig Jaeger, John Sierra, Chris Kane, Keith Reitenbach; Wash. & Lee scoring – Jay Foster, John Kemp; Shots: Cornell 44, Wash. & Lee 35

Team	1	2	3	4	Total
Navy	3	3	6	4	16
Army	2	6	2	3	13
Navy scoring – Mike Hannan 6, Mike Buzzell 5, Brendan Schneck 2, Roger Sexauer, Jim Hamill, Mike Chanenchuk; Army scoring – Jim Pappafotis 3, Scott Finley 3, Ted Harkin 2, Joe Fetzer, Dave Reeves, Tom Endres, Ken Curley, Pete Linskey; Shots: Army 45, Navy 45

Team	1	2	3	4	Total
Maryland	5	1	5	4	15
Virginia	1	3	1	5	10
Maryland scoring – Terry Kimball 5, Pete Worstell 3, Bob Ott 2, John Lamon 2, Barry Mitchell, Drew Tyrie, Rick Moyer; Virginia scoring – Emmett Voekel 4, Paul O’Brien 2, Tom Holman, Mark Dorney, Kris Snider, John Driscoll; Shots: Maryland 42, Virginia 39

Team	1	2	3	4	Total
Johns Hopkins	6	4	5	5	20
Hofstra	1	2	2	3	8
Johns Hopkins scoring – Bob DeSimone 3, Dave Huntley 3, Scott Baugher 3, Mike O'Neill 3, Jeff Blomquist 2, Joe Devlin, Jim Bidne, Ned Radebaugh, Wayne Davis, Jim Zaffuto; Hofstra scoring – Kevin Smith 2, Richard Stoecker 2, Vince Sembrotto 2, Gary Burton, Kevin Huff; Shots: Johns Hopkins 49, Hofstra 34

== Outstanding players ==
- Mike O’Neill, Johns Hopkins, tournament Most Outstanding Player

=== Leading scorers ===
Name	GP	G	A	Pts
Mike O'Neill, Johns Hopkins	3	8	7	15
Scott Baugher, Johns Hopkins	3	6	6	12
Bob DeSimone, Johns Hopkins	3	9	2	11
Bob Henrickson, Cornell	3	8	3	11
Mike Buzzell, Navy	2	6	4	10
Mike Hannan, Navy	2	9	1	10
Dave Huntley, Johns Hopkins	3	8	2	10
Terry Kimball, Maryland	2	7	3	10
Steve Page, Cornell	3	3	7	10
John Lamon, Maryland	2	6	3	9

== See also ==
- 1978 NCAA Division II lacrosse tournament
