= David Huntley =

Lacrosse coach (1957–2017)

Personal information
- Born: July 29, 1956 Toronto, Ontario, Canada
- Died: December 18, 2017 Delray Beach, Florida, U.S.

Sport
- NLL teams: Philadelphia Wings
- NCAA team: Johns Hopkins University 1976–1979 100 Career Goals

Dave Huntley (1956 – December 18, 2017) was a Canadian lacrosse player and head coach and general manager with the Philadelphia Wings of the National Lacrosse League. Huntley played collegiate lacrosse at Johns Hopkins University where he helped his team win two national championships. In 1979, Huntley was honored with the McLaughlin Award, which is presented annually to the nation's most outstanding college lacrosse midfielder. His son, Kevin Huntley, was also an All-American at Johns Hopkins. Huntley was also the first ever head coach for the Toronto Nationals. David Huntley died December 18, 2017, after suffering a heart attack while attending a box lacrosse game in Delray Beach, Florida.

== Playing career ==
Huntley grew up in Toronto, Ontario, playing box lacrosse, an indoor version of the game which is played most commonly in Canada. Huntley was recruited to play field lacrosse for the Johns Hopkins Blue Jays, playing from 1976 to 1979, and helping the team win two consecutive national championships, in 1978 and 1979.

While playing with the Blue Jays he was named a three time All-American, was awarded as the nation's most outstanding midfielder in 1979 when he was presented with the McLaughlin Award, and played on three straight NCAA finals teams. He finished his college career as the leading goal scorer at Johns Hopkins among midfielders. Huntley also played internationally and was a member of Team Canada's gold medal-winning 1978 World Lacrosse Championship team.

Huntley and his son Kevin Huntley, also a former All-American at Johns Hopkins, are the only father–son duo to win two national championships, and are only the second pairing to score 100 or more goals each in their respective Division I lacrosse careers.

== Coaching career ==
Huntley's career in professional lacrosse began in the inaugural season of the Eagle Pro Box Lacrosse League (a predecessor of the National Lacrosse League) in 1987 when he served as the Philadelphia Wings general manager and coach. As general manager, he recruited lacrosse stars Mike French, John Tucker, and John Grant Sr. to play for his team. During the season, due to team injuries, Huntley stepped down from his coaching position and joined the team as a player. In two games, Huntley scored three goals. In subsequent seasons, Huntley worked in various capacities for the Baltimore Thunder, Pittsburgh Crossefire, Washington Power and Colorado Mammoth.

Huntley has been an assistant coach, at times, for Loyola College in Maryland, the Baltimore Bayhawks of Major League Lacrosse, and four times for Team Canada in World Lacrosse Championship competitions. Huntley served as Assistant Coach for the 2006 World Lacrosse Championship gold medal-winning Canadian team.

In 2008, Huntley returned to Philadelphia to be head coach of the Wings. The 2008 Philadelphia Wings season marked the first season in five years that the Wings made the playoffs, ending the longest playoff drought in the history of the franchise. Following the 2010 season, Huntley was also named general manager of the Wings, following Lindsay Sanderson's firing.

Prior to the 2009 MLL season, Huntley was named the head coach of the expansion Toronto Nationals in Major League Lacrosse. He and the Nationals went on to win the 2009 MLL Championship with a 10–9 win over the Denver Outlaws. The following season, the Nationals went 3–9 and missed the playoffs. On January 12, 2011, Huntley resigned as head coach of the Nationals. He served as an offensive coordinator at Calvert Hall. He coached the Atlanta Blaze for one and a half seasons in late 2016 and 2017 before his death.

== Awards ==
Preceded by Bob Hendrickson	McLaughlin Award; 1979	Succeeded by John Driscoll

== See also ==
- Johns Hopkins Blue Jays men's lacrosse
