= Chris Fritz =

Chris Fritz was a co-founder of the Eagle Pro Box Lacrosse League (now called the National Lacrosse League) on May 13, 1987.

Fritz was the league's first President. In June 2005, it was announced that Chris would be inducted into the National Lacrosse League Hall of Fame along with Russ Cline, Paul Gait, Gary Gait and Les Bartley. The induction happened at the 2006 National Lacrosse League All-Star Game in Toronto.

Fritz is Co-Owner and Executive Vice President of the Philadelphia Wings organization.

Fritz spent much of his career as a top concert promoter in the midwest, particularly the Kansas City market.
