= Russ Cline =

Russ Cline was a co-founder of the Eagle Pro Box Lacrosse League (now called the National Lacrosse League) on March 13, 1986. Russ was President/Owner of the Philadelphia Wings organization. They actually Operated as The Major Indoor Lacrosse League on all their Programs and Advertising.

Cline served as Executive Vice President for the league. In May 2001, Cline was named as the first winner of the National Lacrosse League Executive of the Year Award. In June 2005, it was announced that Cline will be inducted into the National Lacrosse League Hall of Fame along with Chris Fritz, Paul Gait, Gary Gait and Les Bartley. It was made official at the 2006 NLL All-Star Game in Toronto.

On April 9, 2007 Cline guaranteed victory for the Wings final home game of the season, or every fan will receive a free ticket to a game in the next season.
