= Mike O'Neill (lacrosse) =

American lacrosse player

Personal information
- Nationality: American

Sport
- Position: Attack
- Shoots: Left
- Coached by: 1979 Assistant Coach University of Delaware
- NCAA team: Johns Hopkins University
- Pro career: 1975–1978

Career highlights
- 1978 NCAA Division I Men's Lacrosse Championship; 1978 Division 1 Player of the Year; 1977, 1978 Division 1 Attackman of the Year; 1982 World Lacrosse Championship Champions (United States); National Lacrosse Hall of Fame entry

Mike O'Neill is a three-time All-American lacrosse player for Johns Hopkins University.

== Career ==
O'Neill was inducted into the National Lacrosse Hall of Fame in 1993. O'Neill is third all time in Career Points at Hopkins.

He was awarded the NCAA Player of the year in 1978, as well as the most outstanding player in the 1978 NCAA Division I Men's Lacrosse Championship. O'Neill led Hopkins to the NCAA finals in 1977 as well.

O'Neill was an all-American prep player at Massapequa High School in New York.

O'Neill was an assistant coach at the University of Delaware in 1979, the University of North Carolina in 1980 and Brown University from 1981 to 1984.

== Johns Hopkins University ==
Season	GP	G	A	Pts	PPG
1975	11	38	15	53	--
1976	13	36	15	51	--
1977	13	31	34	65	5.00
1978	14	33	35	68	4.86
Totals	51	138	99	237	4.60

== See also ==
- Johns Hopkins Blue Jays men's lacrosse
