= Daniel R. Mackesey =

American lawyer

Personal information
- Nationality: American
- Born: July 14, 1954 (age 72) Ithaca, New York, U.S.

Sport
- Position: Goaltender
- NCAA team: Cornell University

Daniel R. Mackesey (born July 14, 1954) is an American former lacrosse player. He attended Cornell University, where he was a member of the Quill and Dagger society and graduated cum laude in 1977.

While at Cornell, Mackesey played on the lacrosse team with distinction. He was an integral member of Cornell's national championship teams in 1976 and 1977. He was a first team All-American both of those seasons as well as winning All-Ivy honors. Cornell won the Ivy League championship in each of Mackesey's three seasons on the varsity roster. Awarded an NCAA Postgraduate Scholarship in 1978, Mackesey was the recipient of the Ensign C. Markland Kelly, Jr. Award as the nation's outstanding goaltender and a recipient of the NCAA Top Five Award in 1978.

After Cornell, Mackesey played for the 1978 U.S. National Team, helping the team to a silver medal in the World Games. Mackesey has been inducted into the Cornell Athletic Hall of Fame, and is a member of the class of 2006 inductees into the National Lacrosse Hall of Fame.

Mackesey graduated from the University of Virginia School of Law. He was a partner at Womble Bond Dickinson for nearly 20 years. Mackesey is currently vice chairman at National Corporate Housing.

== See also ==
- List of National Lacrosse Hall of Fame members
