= Hobart Statesmen =

Athletic teams representing Hobart and William Smith Colleges

Hobart Statesmen and William Smith Herons
- University: Hobart and William Smith Colleges
- Nickname: Statesmen
- Association: Division III
- Conference: Liberty League; UVC (men's volleyball); AMCC (men's volleyball, from 2026–27); NEHC (men's ice hockey); Atlantic 10 (men's lacrosse only–Division I)
- Athletic director: Brian Miller
- Location: Geneva, New York
- Varsity teams: 15
- Football stadium: Boswell Field
- Arena: Bristol Gymnasium
- Baseball stadium: McDonough Park
- Other venues: Geneva Recreation Complex Skating Rink
- Colors: Purple and orange
- Website: hwsathletics.com
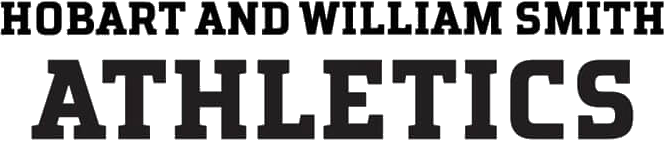

The Hobart Statesmen and William Smith Herons are composed of 15 teams representing Hobart and William Smith Colleges in intercollegiate athletics, including men's alpine skiing, basketball, baseball, cross country, football, golf, ice hockey, lacrosse, rowing, sailing, soccer, squash, swimming and diving, tennis, and volleyball. The Statesmen compete in the NCAA Division III and are members of the Liberty League for all sports except men's rowing (a member of the Intercollegiate Rowing Association (IRA) Division I), and men's volleyball (joining the United Volleyball Conference in 2023–24), men's ice hockey (NEHC), and men's lacrosse, which competes in NCAA Division I, as a member of the Atlantic 10 Conference. With the UVC set to disband after the spring 2026 season, Hobart will move men's volleyball to the Allegheny Mountain Collegiate Conference.

== History ==
Originally known as the Hobart Deacons, Hobart's athletic teams became known as the "Statesmen" in 1936, following the football team's season opener against Amherst College. The morning after the game, The New York Times referred to the team as "the statesmen from Geneva", and the name stuck.

== Affiliations ==
The colleges compete in NCAA Division III, except men's lacrosse, which competes in the Division I Atlantic 10 Conference (A-10). The colleges' main conference affiliation is with the Liberty League with the following exceptions: Hobart ice hockey competes in the New England Hockey Conference; Hobart lacrosse competes in the A-10; and William Smith ice hockey competes in the United Collegiate Hockey Conference. Hobart men's rowing is not an NCAA sport. They compete in the IRA Division I.

== Sports sponsored ==
Men's sports (Statesmen)	Women's sports (Herons)
Alpine skiing	Alpine skiing
Baseball	Basketball
Basketball	Bowling
Cross country	Cross country
Football	Field hockey
Golf	Golf
Ice hockey	Ice hockey
Lacrosse	Lacrosse
Rowing	Rowing
Sailing	Sailing
Soccer	Soccer
Squash	Squash
Swimming	Swimming
Tennis	Tennis
Volleyball	Volleyball

=== Field hockey ===
The William Smith field hockey team has captured three national championships, ascending to the top of Division III in 1992, 1997, and 2000.

=== Football ===
Offensive linesman Ali Marpet, drafted in the second round, 61st overall, of the 2015 NFL draft, is the highest-drafted pick in the history of Division III football. He was three-time All-Liberty League first team (2012, 2013, 2014), and 2014 Liberty League Co-Offensive Player of the Year—the first offensive lineman in league history to be so honored. Ali Marpet became a Super Bowl champion in 2021.

=== Ice hockey ===
The Statesmen ice hockey team is led by Mark Taylor. Since the 2000–2001 season, Coach Taylor has led the Statesmen to a 435–177–56 record and a .693 win percentage (as of 4/1/2025), and eleven 20-plus-win seasons. The Statesmen won their first NCAA Division III Ice Hockey Championship in 2023, defeating the defending champions from Adrian College 3–2 in overtime. They followed that up with two more national championships in 2024 and 2025, becoming the first team to win three straight NCAA Division III championships since 2006 when Middlebury College won three in a row.

=== Lacrosse ===
Hobart lacrosse was started in 1898, playing their first game against rival Cornell. Hobart won 2–1. Hobart became one of the 12 charter members of the U.S. Intercollegiate Lacrosse League in 1906.

The Statesmen lacrosse team has compiled 16 national championships in three different classifications: USILA College Division (1), NCAA Division II/III Combined (2), and NCAA Division III (13). The Statesmen won the first 12 NCAA Division III championships, from 1980 to 1991.

In 1995, Hobart promoted its team from Division III to Division I to preserve the lacrosse rivalry with Cornell and Syracuse. In 2008, the continuation of the series was put in jeopardy when the Hobart Board of Trustees decided to reclassify its lacrosse program back to the Division III level on April 26. After an emotional reaction from the alumni community, however, the decision was reversed on May 1. The following day, Cornell played the first night game at Hobart's Boswell Field.

=== Men's Rowing ===
The Hobart men's rowing team competes in the Intercollegiate Rowing Association (IRA) Division I (College rowing in the United States). The team was formed in 1862 by 18 Alpha Delta Phi fraternity members and has competed regularly at the IRA national finals and the Henley Royal Regatta. Many Statesmen have also gone on to compete internationally both at the Rowing World Championships (Chris and Robert Desino '94) and the Olympics (Kent Smack '97). In 2015, the Statesmen V8 won the Head of the Charles Regatta collegiate eight event. In 2023, Chris Kerber, an American lightweight rower and 2x World Champion, took the helm as Head Coach and is building a top 15 program.

=== Sailing ===
The lone coed team, the HWS sailing team is a member of the Middle Atlantic Intercollegiate Sailing Association. In 2005, the colleges won the Inter-Collegiate Sailing Association Team Race National Championship and the ICSA Coed Dinghy National Championship.

=== Soccer ===
The William Smith soccer team was the first Heron squad to capture a national championship, winning the 1988 title bout with a 1–0 victory over University of California, San Diego. William Smith won its second national championship in 2013, defeating Trinity University.

== Rivalries ==
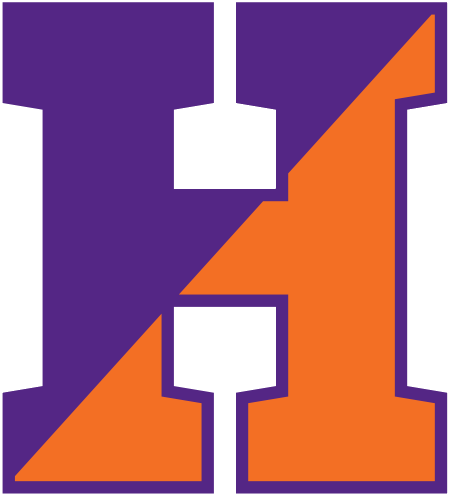
Hobart Statesmen monogram

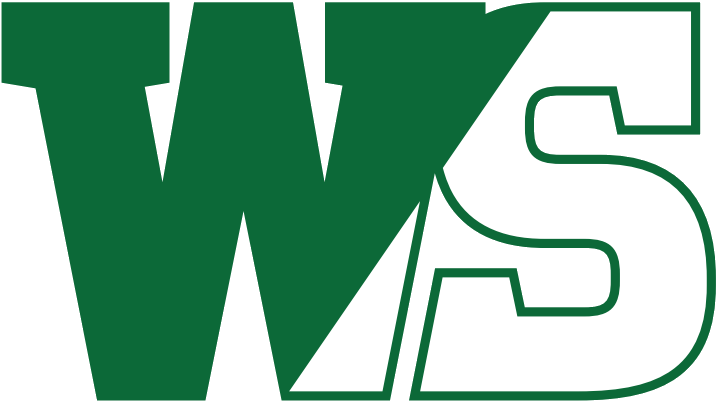
William Smith Herons monogram

Hobart's archrival in football is Union College in Schenectady, New York. Other team rivalries include Clarkson University (Cross Country); Rensselaer (football, basketball); Rochester (football); Elmira, Utica and Manhattanville (hockey); Cornell (one of the oldest in lacrosse) and Syracuse (lacrosse); and Michigan (crew).

== Mascot ==
Originally known as the Hobart Deacons, Hobart's athletic teams became known as the "Statesmen" in 1936, following the football team's season opener against Amherst College. The morning after the game, The New York Times referred to the team as "the statesmen from Geneva," and the name stuck. The nickname for William Smith's athletic teams comes from a contest held in 1982. Several names were submitted, but "Herons" was selected because of the strong and graceful birds that lived at nearby Odell's Pond. These elegant birds frequently flew over the athletic fields as the teams were practicing.
