= Roy Simmons =

Roy Simmons may refer to:

- Roy Simmons (American football) (1956–2014), American football guard
- Roy Simmons Sr. (1901–1994), American lacrosse coach
- Roy Simmons Jr. (born 1935), American lacrosse coach and son of Roy Sr.
