= 2014 Atlantic Coast Conference women's lacrosse season =

Lacrosse conference

The 2014 ACC women's and men's lacrosse conferences will include Notre Dame and Syracuse after those teams joined the ACC in July 2013. The 2014 ACC women's lacrosse conference will now include eight teams. This will be the only year that the ACC women's lacrosse conference will include these eight teams as Maryland will leave the ACC for the Big Ten at the end of the 2014 season. Boston College plays in the women's ACC conference, but not the men's conference.

The finalists from the 2013 NCAA championship game, Maryland and UNC, are in the ACC conference in 2014. Additionally, Syracuse was in the final four of the 2013 NCAA championship tournament, and UVA and Duke were in the final eight. Syracuse lost to Maryland by a goal in that tournament, while UNC won the championship with a 13-12 victory against Maryland. UNC's victory marked the first championship for that program, and broke Northwestern's two year streak as NCAA champions. Members of the 2014 ACC conference won two of the last four championships, with Maryland beating Northwestern in 2010. Before that Northwestern won five championships in a row.

== NCAA tournament performance (last five years) ==
	Duke	Maryland	North Carolina (UNC)	Notre Dame	Syracuse	Virginia (UVA)	Champion
2009		lost in final four to UNC 7-8	lost to NW in final 7-21		lost in elite eight to Maryland 10-12		NORTHWESTERN (NW)
2010		beat NW in final 13-11	lost in final four to NW 10-15		lost in final four to Maryland 5-14		MARYLAND
2011		lost in final to NW 7-8	lost in final four to NW 10-11		not in tournament		NW
2012		lost in final four to NW 7-9	lost in final four to Syracuse 16-17		lost in final to NW 6-8		NW
2013	lost in 3rd round to Maryland 9-14	lost in final to UNC 12-13 in OT	beat Maryland in final 13-12 in OT	lost in 1st round to Stanford	lost in final four to Maryland 10-11	lost to UNC in 3rd round 9-13	NORTH CAROLINA

== Returning All-Americans in the ACC ==
Boston College	2013 All-American team	Position	Class year in 2014	Note
Mikaela Rix	2nd team	Midfield	Jr.	
Covie Stanwick	2nd team	A	Jr.	

Duke	2013 All-American team	Position	Class year in 2014	Note
Kelsey Duryea	2nd team	G	So.	
Taylor Virden	1st team	D	Sr.	

Maryland	2013 All-American team	Position	Class year in 2014	Note
Taylor Cummings	1st team	M	So.	2013 ACC Freshman of the Year

North Carolina	2013 All-American team	Position	Class year in 2014	Note
Abbey Friend	2nd team	A	Senior	
Sloane Serpe	1st team	D	Senior	
Brittney Coppa	3rd team	M	Senior	Will miss 2014 season with ACL injury

Notre Dame	2013 All-American team	Position	Class year in 2014	Note
Barbara Sullivan	1st team	D	Jr.	

Syracuse	2013 All-American team	Position	Class year in 2014	Note
Alyssa Murray	1st team	A	Sr.	2013 finalist for Tewaaraton Award
Kayla Treanor	1st team	A	So.	First freshman in school history to earn 1st team all-America honors

Virginia	2013 All-American team	Position	Class year in 2014	Note
Casey Bocklet	3rd team	A	Jr.	Transferred to Virginia from Northwestern

== High School matrix ==
	Darien, Ct.	Loomis Chaffee, CT	Notre Dame Prep, Md.	Severna Park, Md.	St. Anthony's, Long Island	St. Mary's, Annapolis
Boston College	Cali Ceglarski, M, Sr.	Kate McCarthy, M, Sr.	Covie Stanwick, A, Jr.	Emily Mata, G, Jr.	Claire Blohm, D, Sr.	Kelly McNelis, A, Sr.
Duke			Sydney Peterson, A, Sr.		Kerrin Maurer, A, Jr.	
Maryland			Shanna Brady, D, Jr. Annie Lynch, D, So.			Kristen Lamon, A, Jr. Caitlin Crouse, So.
North Carolina	Caylee Waters, G, Fr.	Devin Markison, A/M, So.		Cassie Ballard, D, Sr.	Maggie Bill, M, Fr.	Megan Ward, G, So.
Notre Dame			Hannah Hartman, M, So. Danielle Lukish, D, So.		Julia Giorgio, M, Sr.	
Syracuse			Kirkland Locey, M, Sr.			
Virginia			Kelsey Gahan, D, Jr. Liz Colgan, G, Sr.			

== Boston College ==
=== Boston College starters ===
==== Attack ====
Starters	Other attackmen

==== Midfield ====
First offensive midfield in first game	Defensive midfield	Other midfielders (alphabetical)

==== Defense ====
Started in first game	Other defensemen (alphabetical)

==== Face Off ====
Name	Note

==== Goalkeeper ====
Name	Note

== Duke ==
=== Duke starters ===
==== Attack ====
Starters	Other attackmen

==== Midfield ====
First offensive midfield in first game	Defensive midfield	Other midfielders (alphabetical)

==== Defense ====
Started in first game	Other defensemen (alphabetical)

==== Face Off ====
Name	Note

==== Goalkeeper ====
Name	Note

== Maryland ==
In the previous season Maryland lost in the final of the NCAA tournament to North Carolina in the third overtime, 12-13. This season Maryland returns 9 of 15 players from that championship game. In comparison, North Carolina returns 12 of 17 players. Maryland was 22-0 going into the final game against North Carolina and had defeated North Carolina twice during the season.

=== Maryland starters ===
==== Attack ====
Name	Note
Brook Griffin, RJr. (#11)	Started in 2012 and 2013
Halle Majorana, So. (#22)	Did not play in the 2013 championship game

==== Midfield ====
Name	Note
Taylor Cummings, So. (#21)	Returning first-team All-American

==== Defense ====
Started in first game	Other defensemen (alphabetical)

==== Draw ====
Name	Note

==== Goalkeeper ====
Name	Note

== North Carolina ==
=== North Carolina depth chart ===
North Carolina won its first championship in 2013 after current head coach Jenny Levy started the school's women's lacrosse program in 1996. In 2014 North Carolina returns 12 of the 17 players in the 2013 championship game. Brittney Coppa, one of UNC's four team captains for 2014 and a three-year starter, will miss the 2014 season after tearing her ACL in January 2014 in a game against the U.S. National Team. Inside Lacrosse ranked UNC's incoming Freshman class as the best in the country.

==== Attack - starters ====
Name	Note
Abbey Friend, Sr. (#18)	2nd team All-American in 2013, captain, in 2014 on the Tewaaraton watch list for the first time
Sydney Holman, Fr. (#10)	Her two older brothers played lacrosse at North Carolina (Marcus graduated in 2013 and Matthew graduated in 2012), her father Brian is an assistant coach of the UNC men's lacrosse team and her mother Laurie is the Director of Operations for the UNC women's lacrosse team. Her father played goalie at Johns Hopkins and her mother played lacrosse at Towson. She was a top 10-ranked recruit in the Class of 2013 and was a four-time team MVP at East Chapel Hill High School. Her high school team won the state championship in her senior year and she set a new state record for career goals.
Aly Messinger, So. (#27)	Scored three goals in the 2013 NCAA championship game, started 17 of 21 games in 2013, one of her older sisters (Kaitlyn) played lacrosse at UNC and graduated in 2012, her other sister (Dana) played lacrosse at Vanderbilt and graduated in 2006, her uncle Roy Messinger played lacrosse at UNC and won championships in 1981 and 1982, her father played lacrosse at the University of Pennsylvania, on 2014 Tewaaraton watch list

==== Attack - appeared in games in 2014 ====
Name	Note
Paige Hanson, Sr. (#2)	
Sam McGee, Jr. (#7)	
Carly Reed, Fr. (#11)	Played in all of UNC's first nine games off the bench, ranked 4th overall freshman in the nation for 2014, scored five goals against Notre Dame
Lindsay Scott, Jr. (#5)	Identical twin sister of defender Sarah Scott

==== Midfield ====
Starters	Note
Maggie Bill, Fr. (#22)	Also on the UNC women's soccer team, played in 12 of 25 games in her first year on the soccer team, ranked as the No. 2 incoming freshman in lacrosse, Coach Levy said Bill's high school recruiting video was the best she has ever seen. Scored four goals against Penn on 3/2/14.
Mallory Frysinger, So. (#1)	Was the only UNC freshman to start every game in 2013
Taylor George, Sr. (#23)	Started all games in 2012 and 2013
Molly Hendrick, Fr. (#20)	Scored in the first seven games of the 2014 season

Other midfielders with playing time	Note
Carly Davis, RFr.	
Devin Markisson, So.	

==== Defense ====
Starters	Note
Margaret Corzel, RJr. (#9)	Team captain for second year
Mallory Frysinger, So. (#1)	Second-year starter
Sarah Scott, Jr. (#19)	First year starter
Sloane Serpe, Sr. (#16)	1st team All American in 2013, captain for second consecutive season, starter for four years, on 2014 Tewaaraton watch list
Caileigh Sindall, Jr. (#31)	Returning two-year starter

Other defenders with playing time	Note
Maggie Auslander, Fr. (#33)	No. 8 ranked recruit
Stephanie Lobb, RFr. (#34)	
Courtney Waite, Jr.	

==== Goalkeeper ====
Name	Note
Megan Ward, So.	Started last seven games of the 2013 season
Caylee Waters, Fr.	Backup to Ward, played in the second half of games to start the 2014 season

Maggie Bill is a freshman at the University of North Carolina at Chapel Hill who accomplished the rare feat of playing on two varsity college sports teams, the women's lacrosse and soccer teams, that both won national championships in their previous seasons. Bill committed to play both sports in the middle of her sophomore year in high school. She scored 12 goals when she was five years old in her first organized lacrosse game. UNC women's lacrosse Coach Jenny Levy said Bill's high school recruiting video was the best she has ever seen. Bill's soccer team won the state championship in her last two years in high school. She was a first-team All-American in lacrosse in her sophomore year in high school. Bill is the second of six children with two brothers and three sisters.

== College career ==
Soccer: Bill played in 12 of 25 games in her first season at UNC.

Lacrosse: She was the No. 2 incoming freshman in lacrosse in the U.S. and earned a starting spot on UNC's midfield. She practiced with the lacrosse team for two weeks before scoring two goals in a close loss to the U.S. national lacrosse team in an exhibition match. After starting the first game of UNC's lacrosse season, she scored four goals in UNC's sixth game against Penn on March 2, 2014. Womenslax.com named Bill rookie of the week after her performance against Penn.

== High School in Long Island ==
Maggie Bill played for St. Anthony's High School on Long Island, New York in the Nassau Suffolk Catholic High School League. She was a first-team All-American in lacrosse her sophomore year in high school after missing her soccer season due to a torn ACL. She committed to UNC before her sophomore season in lacrosse. She also played point guard on the basketball team in addition to soccer and lacrosse.

Freshman year: Started on the varsity lacrosse team, suffered a torn ACL in at end of the lacrosse season, lacrosse team won league championship

Sophomore year: missed the soccer season due to a torn ACL, lacrosse team won league championship

Junior year: Won league and state championships in soccer, lacrosse team won league championship, MVP in championship game

Senior year: Won league and state championships in soccer, soccer championship game MVP, lacrosse team won league championship for the sixth straight year. Bill had 65 goals (3.6 per game) and 18 assists (1.0 per game) in lacrosse her senior year.

== Notre Dame ==
=== Notre Dame starters ===
==== Attack ====
Starters	Note
Cortney Fortunato, Fr.	On her high school varsity lacrosse team for six years, leading team in points after four games

==== Midfield ====
First offensive midfield in first game	Defensive midfield	Other midfielders (alphabetical)

==== Defense ====
Started in first game	Other defensemen (alphabetical)

==== Face Off ====
Name	Note

==== Goalkeeper ====
Name	Note

== Syracuse ==
=== Syracuse starters ===
==== Attack ====
Name	Note
Devon Collins, Jr.	Started in 21 of 23 games her freshman year
Kailah Kempney, Jr.	
Alyssa Murray, Sr. (#1)	Tewaaraton Award finalist after her Junior year. Led Syracuse in points in 2013.
Taylor Poplawski, Fr. (#19)	Played in first five games off bench and third on team in goals. In high school she was a five-time all-league first team honoree.
Kayla Treanor, So. (#21)	First freshman on women's lacrosse team at Syracuse to be named first team All-American. Leading Syracuse in points after five games in 2014. Scored seven goals for the US national team against UNC in an exhibition match in January 2014

==== Midfield ====
Name	Note
Amy Cross, Sr.	Sister Kelly Cross (So.) is on the team
Gabby Jaquith, Jr. (#20)	
Katie Webster, Sr.	Started every game her freshman year, on 2014 Tewaaraton watch list

==== Defense ====
Name	Note

==== Face Off ====
Name	Note
Natalie Glanell, Sr.	
Kasey Mock, Sr.	
Mallory Vehar, Jr.	Brother Griffin was on the Syracuse men's lacrosse team from 2010 to 2013

==== Goalkeeper ====
Name	Note
Kelsey Richardson, Jr.	

== Virginia ==
=== Virginia starters ===
==== Attack ====
Starters	Other attackmen

==== Midfield ====
First offensive midfield in first game	Defensive midfield	Other midfielders (alphabetical)

==== Defense ====
Started in first game	Other defensemen (alphabetical)

==== Face Off ====
Name	Note

==== Goalkeeper ====
Name	Note
