= Hobart–Syracuse lacrosse rivalry =

Intercollegiate lacrosse rivalry in New York state

- Syracuse Orange
- Teams: Hobart Statesmen; Syracuse Orange
- First meeting: April 29, 1916; Hobart 9, Syracuse 1
- Latest meeting: March 23, 2024; Syracuse 13, Hobart 7
- Trophy: Kraus-Simmons Trophy

Statistics
- Total meetings: 107
- All-time series: Syracuse, 81–26–2
- Trophy series: Syracuse, 35–3–0
- Largest victory: Syracuse, 16–0 (1928); Hobart, 23–7 (1975), 24–8 (1977)
- Longest win streak: Syracuse, 19 (1987–2005)
- Current win streak: Syracuse, 10 (2014–Present)

The Hobart Statesmen and the Syracuse Orange, both based in Upstate New York, developed one of the most historically relevant rivalries in college lacrosse. The rivalry trails only the Cornell–Hobart and Johns Hopkins–Maryland rivalries as the third-oldest series in lacrosse. The Statesmen and Orange have combined for 32 national championships, with the two maintaining annual nature of the rivalry, even after the NCAA split into separate divisions. During the 1970s through the 1990s, Hobart competed in Divisions II and III, while Syracuse competed in Division I. Both programs dominated their respective divisions during this period, with Hobart capturing 15 national championships during this period and the Orange claiming 6. In 1995, Hobart promoted its team from Division III to Division I to preserve the series with the Orange and its other upstate rival Cornell. In 2008, the annual rivalry was jeopardized when Hobart's board of trustees voted to reclassify its lacrosse program back to the Division III level. After an emotional reaction from the alumni community, however, the decision was reversed on May 1. Syracuse leads the series, described as a classic "David versus Goliath" contest, 81–26–2 through 2024.

== Series History ==
=== Early Years (Pre-1970s) ===
The series dates back to April 29, 1916 with a Hobart victory over the Orange. After three consecutive victories by the Statesmen, Syracuse asserted dominance over the rivalry, with only one Hobart victory breaking up a 21 game unbeaten streak. The two would trade blows from 1937 to 1951, with Syracuse taking eight of sixteen matchups during this stretch. Another string of Orange victories with 11 straight victories was ended by an 11–10 Hobart win, the first of four straight victories for the Statesmen. Syracuse would follow with their own four game streak, ending in 1972.

=== Divisional Golden Years (1970s to 1990s) ===
The introduction of the NCAA Division I Men's Lacrosse Championship in 1971 changed course for the rivalry. Syracuse remained in Division I, while the Statesmen began competing at the Division II level in 1974, before eventually moving to Division III in 1980. With Jerry Schmidt at the helm, the Statesmen would embark on the beginning of its greatest era in program history. In 1972, Hobart would rout the Orange 18–7 in Geneva, en route to their first ever national championship, claimed after prevailing in the USILA playoffs. That victory marked the first of eight consecutive triumphs in the rivalry, with only one game coming within six goals. Five Hobart's victories came with Syracuse ranked, including twice when the Orange were in the Top 10. Hobart would win two more national championships under Jerry Schmidt, accompanied by three title game runner-ups during this period.

In 1980, Syracuse would regain momentum. After their first NCAA tournament appearance the previous year, the #4 Orange got payback for Hobart dominance, winning 22–13. At the Division III level, new head coach Dave Urick led the Statesmen to their first of 12 consecutive national championships, beginning with the 1980 season. A thrilling contest the following year result in an overtime victory for the Orange. A Hobart win in 1982 was followed by Syracuse's 17–10 victory in '83, as the Orange won their first national championship since 1957.

The Kraus-Simmons trophy was introduced in 1986, named for two Hall of Fame coaches, Roy Simmons Sr. for Syracuse and Babe Kraus for Hobart. The 1986 game was a watershed for the rivalry, as the Statesmen upset the #1 Orange 16–13 in Geneva. The game took place before a crowd of 8,450 at Boswell Field, despite it only officially seating 4,500. Hobart completed its best season record-wise since the undefeated 1977 campaign, finishing at 15–1 and winning a seventh consecutive Division III title.

In the following years, Syracuse would continue its dominance of Division I while Hobart held put in the lower division. In 1987, Syracuse would avenge its upset from the prior year with a five goal differential. This would be the first of a series-record 19 straight victories for the Orange, as they captured five more championships under Hall of Fame coach Roy Simmons Jr. The Statesmen would be unable to compete with the Orange, losing by 14 in 1994. That season would be Hobart's last in the lower divisions, as the program reclassified to Division I in an effort to preserve its rivalries with Syracuse and Cornell, though it would become one of the few non-Division I teams to play at the level without the use of athletic scholarships.

=== Recent Years (1995 to Present) ===
Under coach B.J. O'Hara, the Statesmen would begin their first season in Division I in 1995 with three more championships in tow after the departure of Urick. The 1995 game featured renewed energy and fervor, as the #4 Orange nipped the #18 Statesmen 18 to 17 in what would be the highest scoring game until the 2020 edition. The game would be a ranked affair for four of five meetings, highlighted by another narrow Syracuse win in 1997, an overtime result. Nonetheless, Hobart was unable to knock off the Orange during this stretch, as they made their first four appearances in the Division I tournament.

Syracuse edged past a ranked Hobart yet again in the 91st meeting but the following year, the Statesmen would snap the streak on the road, pulling out a 9–8 victory, their first since 1986. Two years later, in 2008, the annual series was almost cancelled by a decision from Hobart's board of trustees, which voted to reclassify back to Division III. Emotional resistance from alumni halted the process and Hobart chose to remain at Division I in men's lacrosse.

Hobart would again defeat Syracuse in 2013, the 99th meeting in the rivalry's storied history. The Orange would go on to finish the season as the national runner-up. However, the 100th would go the way of Syracuse. Five years later, the game would be a ranked matchup again, with Syracuse topping the Statesmen 17 to 5. Since Hobart's most recent victory in 2013, Syracuse has won the last ten to extend its series lead to 81–26–2. Nonetheless, the game usually remains a competitive fixture, as current Orange coach John Desko describes it as a "throw the records right out the window [type of game.] They always play well against Syracuse."

== Rival Accomplishments ==
The following summarizes the accomplishments of the two programs as of 2020 season.

Team	Hobart Statesmen	Syracuse Orange
Pre-NCAA National Titles	1	5
NCAA National Titles	15^	11*
NCAA Final Four Appearances	20^	27*
NCAA Tournament Appearances	26^	38*
NCAA Tournament Record	55–11^	68–27*
Conference Tournament Titles	1	4
Conference Championships	3	5
Tewaarton Award Recipients	0	3
Lt. Raymond Enners Award Recipients	0	7
Consensus First Team All-Americans	13	100
All-time Program Record	788–512–20	917–352–16
All-time Winning Percentage	.605	.720

- ^21 of Hobart's NCAA tournament appearances and all 15 titles came at either the NCAA Division II or III level
- Due to NCAA violations, Syracuse was forced to vacate its 1990 NCAA title and tournament appearance.

== Game Results ==
Hobart victories	Syracuse victories	Tie games

No.	Date	Location	Winner	Score
1	1916	Syracuse, NY	Hobart	9–1
2	1916	Syracuse, NY	Hobart	14–0
3	1919	Geneva, NY	Hobart	6–1
4	1919	Syracuse, NY	Syracuse	3–2
5	1920	Syracuse, NY	Tie	2–2
6	1921	Geneva, NY	Syracuse	6–0
7	1922	Syracuse, NY	Syracuse	3–2
8	1923	Geneva, NY	Syracuse	7–0
9	1924	Syracuse, NY	Syracuse	6–5
10	1925	Geneva, NY	Syracuse	7–4
11	1926	Syracuse, NY	Syracuse	4–3
12	1927	Geneva, NY	Tie	4–4^{OT}
13	1928	Syracuse, NY	Syracuse	16–0
14	1929	Geneva, NY	Hobart	5–2
15	1930	Geneva, NY	Syracuse	6–1
16	1931	Syracuse, NY	Syracuse	9–1
17	1932	Geneva, NY	Syracuse	11–0
18	1933	Syracuse, NY	Syracuse	15–0
19	1933	Geneva, NY	Syracuse	10–5
20	1934	Syracuse, NY	Syracuse	10–2
21	1934	Geneva, NY	Syracuse	10–5
22	1935	Syracuse, NY	Syracuse	11–3
23	1935	Geneva, NY	Syracuse	17–4
24	1936	Geneva, NY	Syracuse	16–11
25	1937	Syracuse, NY	Hobart	12–7
26	1938	Geneva, NY	Hobart	9–7^{OT}
27	1939	Syracuse, NY	Syracuse	14–7
28	1940	Geneva, NY	Hobart	14–8
29	1941	Syracuse, NY	Syracuse	17–8
30	1942	Geneva, NY	Syracuse	12–7
31	1946	Syracuse, NY	Syracuse	10–7
32	1946	Geneva, NY	Hobart	8–5
33	1947	Syracuse, NY	Syracuse	9–5
34	1947	Geneva, NY	Hobart	10–5
35	1948	Geneva, NY	Syracuse	13–11
36	1949	Syracuse, NY	Syracuse	15–2
37	1950	Geneva, NY	Syracuse	15–1

No.	Date	Location	Winner	Score
38	1951	Syracuse, NY	Hobart	15–7
39	1952	Geneva, NY	Syracuse	15–7
40	1953	Geneva, NY	Syracuse	12–7
41	1954	Geneva, NY	Syracuse	18–11
42	1955	Syracuse, NY	Syracuse	15–14
43	1956	Geneva, NY	Syracuse	18–10
44	1957	Syracuse, NY	Syracuse	16–4
45	1958	Geneva, NY	Syracuse	16–1
46	1959	Syracuse, NY	Syracuse	11–9
47	1960	Geneva, NY	Syracuse	15–11
48	1962	Geneva, NY	Syracuse	13–9
49	1963	Syracuse, NY	Syracuse	15–7
50	1964	Geneva, NY	Hobart	11–10
51	1965	Syracuse, NY	Hobart	14–8
52	1966	Geneva, NY	Hobart	13–8
53	1967	Syracuse, NY	Hobart	11–8
54	1968	Geneva, NY	Syracuse	16–4
55	1969	Syracuse, NY	Syracuse	21–5
56	1970	Geneva, NY	Syracuse	12–7
57	1971	Syracuse, NY	Syracuse	12–11^{OT}
58	1972	Geneva, NY	Hobart	18–7
59	1973	Syracuse, NY	#12 Hobart	20–7
60	1974	Geneva, NY	Hobart	22–7
61	1975	Syracuse, NY	Hobart	23–7
62	1976	Geneva, NY	Hobart	18–15
63	1977	Syracuse, NY	Hobart	24–8
64	1978	Geneva, NY	Hobart	15–9
65	1979	Syracuse, NY	Hobart	16–4
66	1980	Geneva, NY	#4 Syracuse	22–13
67	1981	Syracuse, NY	#3 Syracuse	12–11^{OT}
68	1982	Geneva, NY	Hobart	11–8
69	1983	Syracuse, NY	#1 Syracuse	17–10
70	1984	Manhasset, NY	Syracuse	15–10
71	1985	Geneva, NY	#1 Syracuse	16–12
72	1986	Geneva, NY	Hobart	16–13
73	1987	Syracuse, NY	#7 Syracuse	20–15
74	1988	Syracuse, NY	#1 Syracuse	16–8

No.	Date	Location	Winner	Score
75	1989	Geneva, NY	#2 Syracuse	17–8
76	1990	Syracuse, NY	#1 Syracuse	23–9
77	1991	Syracuse, NY	#8 Syracuse	22–8
78	1992	Geneva, NY	#1 Syracuse	17–13
79	1993	Syracuse, NY	#3 Syracuse	22–8
80	1994	Syracuse, NY	#4 Syracuse	28–14
81	1995	Geneva, NY	#4 Syracuse	18–17
82	1996	Syracuse, NY	#7 Syracuse	13–7
83	1997	Syracuse, NY	#4 Syracuse	16–15^{OT}
84	1998	Syracuse, NY	#6 Syracuse	18–5
85	1999	Geneva, NY	#5 Syracuse	10–7
86	2000	Syracuse, NY	#1 Syracuse	18–6
87	2001	Geneva, NY	#2 Syracuse	13–5
88	2002	Syracuse, NY	#1 Syracuse	19–4
89	2003	Geneva, NY	#5 Syracuse	15–12
90	2004	Syracuse, NY	#3 Syracuse	16–10
91	2005	Geneva, NY	#8 Syracuse	13–12
92	2006	Syracuse, NY	Hobart	9–8
93	2007	Syracuse, NY	#7 Syracuse	13–11
94	2008	Geneva, NY	#2 Syracuse	13–5
95	2009	Syracuse, NY	#2 Syracuse	13–4
96	2010	Geneva, NY	#2 Syracuse	9–8^{OT}
97	2011	Syracuse, NY	#4 Syracuse	13–7
98	2012	Geneva, NY	#15 Syracuse	13–12
99	2013	Syracuse, NY	Hobart	13–12
100	2014	Geneva, NY	#4 Syracuse	15–9
101	2015	Syracuse, NY	#4 Syracuse	18–5
102	2016	Geneva, NY	#10 Syracuse	13–6
103	2017	Geneva, NY	#2 Syracuse	17–11
104	2018	Syracuse, NY	#8 Syracuse	11–4
105	2019	Geneva, NY	#11 Syracuse	17–5
106	2020	Syracuse, NY	#3 Syracuse	21–13
107	2022	Syracuse, NY	#14 Syracuse	18–16
108	2023	Syracuse, NY	Syracuse	18–7
109	2024	Geneva, NY	#5 Syracuse	13–7
Series: Syracuse leads 81–26–2
