= Cornell–Syracuse lacrosse rivalry =

College sports rivalry

- Cornell Big Red Syracuse Orange
- First meeting: May 21, 1920; Syracuse 5, Cornell 3 ^{OT}
- Latest meeting: April 12, 2025; Cornell 17, Syracuse 12

Statistics
- Total meetings: 110
- All-time series: Syracuse leads, 66–43–1
- Largest victory: Cornell, 27–4 (1974)
- Longest win streak: Syracuse, 16 (1946–1957)
- Current win streak: Cornell, 3 (2022–present)

The Cornell–Syracuse lacrosse rivalry is an intercollegiate lacrosse rivalry between Cornell Big Red and Syracuse Orange. The two New York state programs are historical lacrosse powers, combining for 23 national titles. Since the creation of the NCAA Division I men's lacrosse tournament, Cornell and Syracuse have appeared in 40 Final Fours and captured 14 total titles. Syracuse leads the series 66–43–1 through 2025.

== Series History ==
=== Early Years (1920s to 1960s) ===
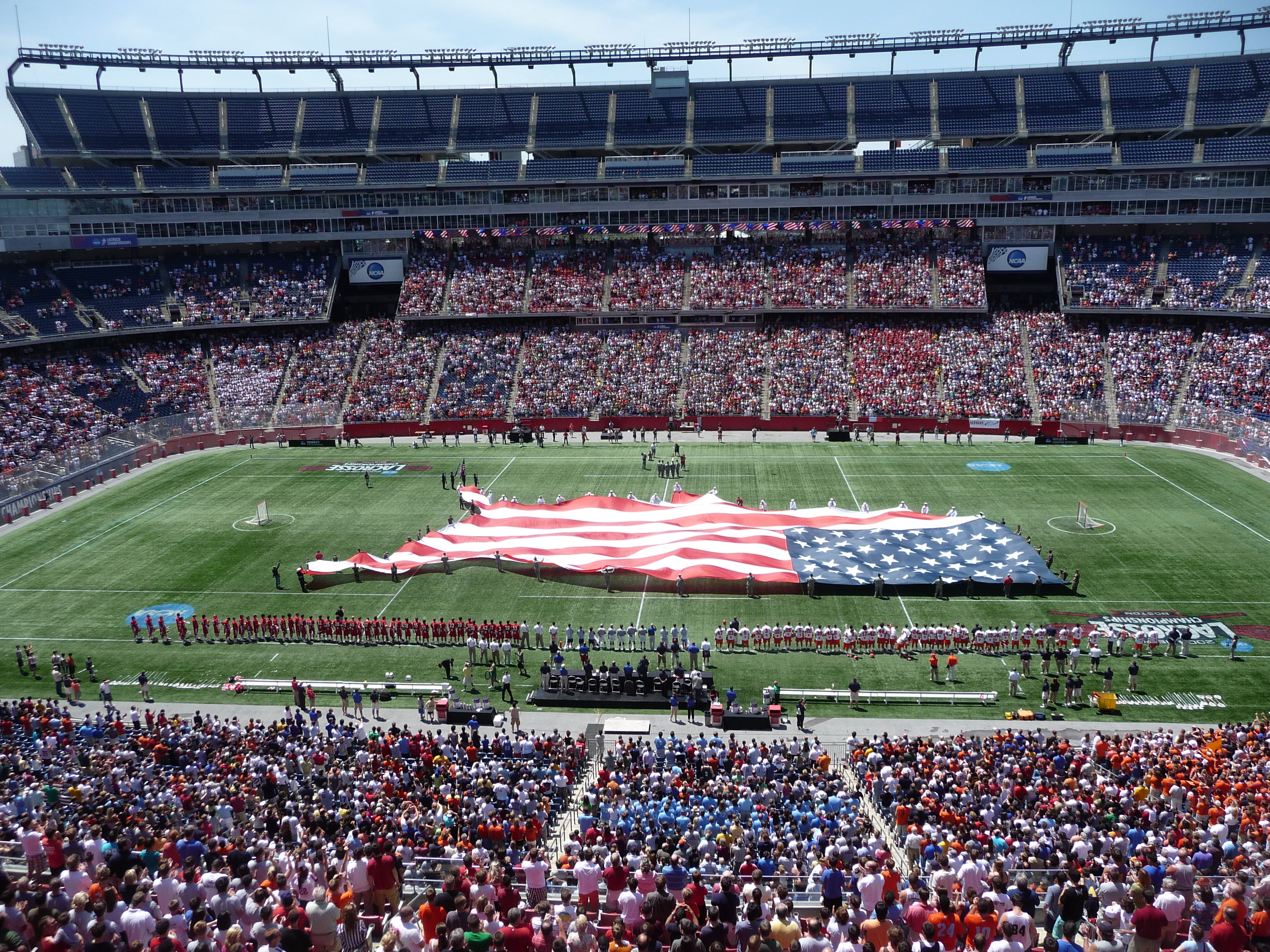
NCAA Championship 2009. Syracuse vs. Cornell pregame in Gillette Stadium. Syracuse would win 10–9 in OT.

Only an hour away from each in upstate New York, the two programs first met in 1920 and would meet annually until World War II would halt the matchup in 1943. During this early stretch, both programs experienced streaks of success in the rivalry. Syracuse would win eight of the first nine meetings, including the initial game, a 5 to 3 victory. Each team would maintain five game winning streaks in the 1930s, while Cornell won the last game prior to World War II.

After the Big Red won the 1942 contest in Ithaca, Syracuse would embark on the longest streak in the history of the rivalry, ripping off 16 straight games from 1946 to 1957. A 22–5 victory was the largest in series history at the time, but the following year the narrative flipped.

=== Cornell Dominance (1958 to 1982) ===
Cornell would dominate the contest in 1958 and would take five of seven games for its best series stretch since the 1930s. In 1966, the Big Red would win the first of 12 straight meetings against the Orange. During this period, Cornell was one of the top lacrosse programs in the country, capturing three national titles and appearing in six Final Fours. In contrast, under Roy Simmons Jr., Syracuse would only make their first NCAA tournament appearance in 1979. The games were increasingly lopsided during this period; the Big Red won seven by at least ten goals, including a 27 to 4 rout in 1974. Simmons would call the era's Cornell squads "the finest attack I've ever seen." Syracuse would halt the streak with a 1980 victory in Ithaca, but would not truly take back the series until 1983.

=== Syracuse's Rise to National Power (1983 to 1999) ===
In the 1983 meeting, No. 4 Syracuse defeated Cornell en route to its first national title in 26 years. The next nine matchups would feature an unprecedented streak where the winning team was ranked either No. 1 or No. 2 on top of the polls. After four consecutive Orange victories, Richard Moran's team would sweep the 1987 meetings, including the first postseason game between in the two. In the 1987 tournament, the Big Red would top Syracuse in a thrilling Final Four game by a score of 18–15. The Orange would get revenge the following year, topping unseeded Cornell in the championship game to capture their second NCAA title. Syracuse would dominate the rest of the century, winning four more national titles and the remaining eleven matchups between the two. Cornell would struggle, only making two more tournament appearances, neither time escaping the first round.

=== Recent Years (2000 to present) ===
The 21st century brought renewed energy, as under third-year head coach Dave Pietramala, the Big Red would return to the tournament after a successful 2000 season, headlined by a 13–12 victory over the Orange in Ithaca. With Jeff Tambroni taking the helm in 2001, Cornell would return to the ranks of the nation's elite and restore balance to the series. The rivalry reached a new crescendo in 2009, as the two teams meet in Foxborough to decide the national title. In an instant classic, Syracuse nabbed its 11th national title with a 10–9 overtime defeat of the Big Red, their second victory over the team in a championship game. After forcing a turnover with 27.6 seconds remaining in the game, Cornell seemed poised for their fourth national title until Kenny Nims stripped the ball and finished the break with four seconds left to force an extra period. In overtime, Syracuse senior Dan Hardy assisted Cody Jamieson, who sunk the game-winner to successfully defend the Orange's 2008 crown. Since then, Syracuse has defeated in Cornell in six of the last eleven meetings, in a relatively balanced era for a rivalry driven by long streaks. Recently, Cornell prevailed over the Orange in their fourth postseason game, a 10–9 victory in the 2018 tournament. The 2020 contest was cancelled due to the COVID-19 pandemic, the first year without the annual game since 1978 and only the fifth overall since the series began in 1920.

== Rival Accomplishments ==
The following summarizes the accomplishments of the two programs.

| Team | Cornell Big Red | Syracuse Orange |
|---|---|---|
| Pre-NCAA National Titles | 5 | 5 |
| NCAA National Titles | 4 | 11* |
| NCAA Final Four Appearances | 15 | 28* |
| NCAA Tournament Appearances | 31 | 42* |
| NCAA Tournament Record | 33–25 | 68–27* |
| Conference Tournament Titles | 2 | 4 |
| Conference Championships | 29 | 5 |
| Tewaarton Award Recipients | 2 | 3 |
| Lt. Raymond Enners Award Recipients | 6 | 7 |
| Consensus First Team All-Americans | 55 | 100 |
| All-time Program Record | 773–485–27 | 917–352–16 |
| All-time Winning Percentage | .612 | .720 |

- Due to NCAA violations, Syracuse was forced to vacate its 1990 NCAA title and tournament appearance.

== Game Results ==
| Cornell victories | Syracuse victories | Tie games |

| No. | Date | Location | Winner | Score |
|---|---|---|---|---|
| 1 | May 21, 1920 | Syracuse, NY | Syracuse | 5–3^{OT} |
| 2 | May 28, 1921 | Ithaca, NY | Syracuse | 8–3 |
| 3 | May 20, 1922 | Syracuse, NY | Syracuse | 2–0 |
| 4 | May 26, 1923 | Ithaca, NY | Cornell | 3–1 |
| 5 | April 26, 1924 | Syracuse, NY | Syracuse | 4–0 |
| 6 | May 16, 1925 | Ithaca, NY | Syracuse | 6–1 |
| 7 | May 1, 1926 | Syracuse, NY | Syracuse | 9–0 |
| 8 | April 23, 1927 | Ithaca, NY | Syracuse | 4–0 |
| 9 | April 28, 1928 | Syracuse, NY | Syracuse | 5–2 |
| 10 | April 27, 1929 | Ithaca, NY | Tie | 4–4 |
| 11 | April 19, 1930 | Syracuse, NY | Cornell | 6–4 |
| 12 | April 11, 1931 | Ithaca, NY | Cornell | 4–3 |
| 13 | April 23, 1932 | Syracuse, NY | Cornell | 4–2 |
| 14 | May 13, 1933 | Syracuse, NY | Cornell | 10–8 |
| 15 | May 27, 1933 | Ithaca, NY | Cornell | 8–7 |
| 16 | April 21, 1934 | Syracuse, NY | Syracuse | 17–7 |
| 17 | May 26, 1934 | Ithaca, NY | Syracuse | 14–4 |
| 18 | May 25, 1935 | Syracuse, NY | Syracuse | 19–9 |
| 19 | May 23, 1936 | Ithaca, NY | Syracuse | 17–7 |
| 20 | May 19, 1937 | Syracuse, NY | Syracuse | 19–5 |
| 21 | May 21, 1938 | Ithaca, NY | Cornell | 14–8 |
| 22 | April 29, 1939 | Syracuse, NY | Syracuse | 13–7 |
| 23 | May 11, 1940 | Ithaca, NY | Syracuse | 14–7 |
| 24 | April 26, 1941 | Syracuse, NY | Syracuse | 14–9 |
| 25 | May 9, 1942 | Ithaca, NY | Cornell | 7–4 |
| 26 | April 24, 1943 | Ithaca, NY | Cornell | 10–8 |
| 27 | May 1, 1943 | Syracuse, NY | Cornell | 7–5 |
| 28 | April 20, 1946 | Ithaca, NY | Syracuse | 8–3 |
| 29 | April 27, 1946 | Syracuse, NY | Syracuse | 12–2 |
| 30 | April 26, 1947 | Syracuse, NY | Syracuse | 10–9 |
| 31 | May 22, 1948 | Ithaca, NY | Syracuse | 10–6 |
| 32 | May 18, 1949 | Syracuse, NY | Syracuse | 17–7 |
| 33 | April 15, 1950 | Ithaca, NY | Syracuse | 9–4 |
| 34 | May 2, 1951 | Syracuse, NY | Syracuse | 8–7 |
| 35 | May 16, 1951 | Ithaca, NY | Syracuse | 11–10 |
| 36 | April 30, 1952 | Syracuse, NY | Syracuse | 10–4 |
| 37 | May 14, 1952 | Ithaca, NY | Syracuse | 12–3 |
| 38 | April 29, 1953 | Syracuse, NY | Syracuse | 10–6 |

| No. | Date | Location | Winner | Score |
|---|---|---|---|---|
| 39 | May 9, 1953 | Ithaca, NY | Syracuse | 8–5 |
| 40 | May 19, 1954 | Ithaca, NY | Syracuse | 12–8 |
| 41 | May 18, 1955 | Syracuse, NY | Syracuse | 13–12 |
| 42 | May 16, 1956 | Ithaca, NY | Syracuse | 13–11 |
| 43 | May 15, 1957 | Syracuse, NY | Syracuse | 22–5 |
| 44 | May 14, 1958 | Ithaca, NY | Cornell | 13–5 |
| 45 | May 13, 1959 | Syracuse, NY | Cornell | 11–8 |
| 46 | May 11, 1960 | Ithaca, NY | Syracuse | 7–6 |
| 47 | May 10, 1961 | Syracuse, NY | Cornell | 14–11 |
| 48 | May 15, 1962 | Ithaca, NY | Cornell | 8–6 |
| 49 | May 15, 1963 | Syracuse, NY | Syracuse | 16–11 |
| 50 | May 20, 1964 | Ithaca, NY | Cornell | 14–10 |
| 51 | May 12, 1965 | Syracuse, NY | Syracuse | 14–11 |
| 52 | May 18, 1966 | Ithaca, NY | Cornell | 19–2 |
| 53 | May 16, 1967 | Syracuse, NY | Cornell | 19–2 |
| 54 | April 16, 1968 | Ithaca, NY | Cornell | 16–5 |
| 55 | May 24, 1969 | Syracuse, NY | Cornell | 11–8 |
| 56 | May 23, 1970 | Ithaca, NY | Cornell | 11–7 |
| 57 | April 21, 1971 | Syracuse, NY | Cornell | 17–9 |
| 58 | April 20, 1972 | Ithaca, NY | Cornell | 21–3 |
| 59 | April 18, 1973 | Syracuse, NY | #14 Cornell | 12–3 |
| 60 | April 3, 1974 | Ithaca, NY | #5 Cornell | 27–4 |
| 61 | April 28, 1975 | Syracuse, NY | #2 Cornell | 16–5 |
| 62 | April 12, 1976 | Ithaca, NY | #2 Cornell | 24–6 |
| 63 | March 24, 1979 | Syracuse, NY | #3 Cornell | 10–6 |
| 64 | April 8, 1980 | Ithaca, NY | #6 Syracuse | 6–5 |
| 65 | April 29, 1981 | Syracuse, NY | #13 Cornell | 13–7 |
| 66 | April 28, 1982 | Ithaca, NY | #9 Cornell | 10–5 |
| 67 | April 27, 1983 | Syracuse, NY | #4 Syracuse | 17–8 |
| 68 | April 25, 1984 | Ithaca, NY | #1 Syracuse | 14–11 |
| 69 | April 13, 1985 | Syracuse, NY | #1 Syracuse | 12–10 |
| 70 | April 12, 1986 | Ithaca, NY | #1 Syracuse | 22–7 |
| 71 | April 11, 1987 | Syracuse, NY | #2 Cornell | 19–6 |
| 72 | May 23, 1987 | Syracuse, NY | #2 Cornell | 18–15 |
| 73 | April 20, 1988 | Ithaca, NY | #1 Syracuse | 19–7 |
| 74 | May 30, 1988 | Syracuse, NY | #1 Syracuse | 13–8 |
| 75 | April 19, 1989 | Syracuse, NY | #2 Syracuse | 20–12 |
| 76 | April 18, 1990 | Ithaca, NY | #1 Syracuse | 22–10 |

| No. | Date | Location | Winner | Score |
|---|---|---|---|---|
| 77 | April 17, 1991 | Syracuse, NY | #7 Syracuse | 13–5 |
| 78 | April 15, 1992 | Ithaca, NY | #1 Syracuse | 15–10 |
| 79 | April 10, 1993 | Syracuse, NY | #3 Syracuse | 15–5 |
| 80 | April 9, 1994 | Ithaca, NY | #4 Syracuse | 22–5 |
| 81 | April 8, 1995 | Syracuse, NY | #4 Syracuse | 24–13 |
| 82 | April 10, 1996 | Ithaca, NY | #6 Syracuse | 16–8 |
| 83 | April 8, 1997 | Syracuse, NY | #5 Syracuse | 16–7 |
| 84 | April 7, 1998 | Ithaca, NY | #3 Syracuse | 13–8 |
| 85 | April 13, 1999 | Syracuse, NY | #5 Syracuse | 15–10 |
| 86 | April 11, 2000 | Ithaca, NY | #9 Cornell | 13–12 |
| 87 | April 10, 2001 | Syracuse, NY | #3 Syracuse | 14–10 |
| 88 | April 9, 2002 | Ithaca, NY | #9 Cornell | 15–11 |
| 89 | April 8, 2003 | Syracuse, NY | #4 Syracuse | 13–8 |
| 90 | April 13, 2004 | Ithaca, NY | #4 Syracuse | 12–10 |
| 91 | April 12, 2005 | Syracuse, NY | #8 Cornell | 16–14 |
| 92 | April 11, 2006 | Ithaca, NY | #12 Syracuse | 12–11 |
| 93 | April 10, 2007 | Syracuse, NY | #1 Cornell | 16–15 |
| 94 | April 8, 2008 | Ithaca, NY | #1 Syracuse | 15–8 |
| 95 | April 7, 2009 | Syracuse, NY | #5 Syracuse | 15–10 |
| 96 | May 25, 2009 | Foxborough, MA | #1 Syracuse | 10–9^{OT} |
| 97 | April 13, 2010 | Ithaca, NY | #2 Syracuse | 8–7 |
| 98 | April 13, 2011 | Syracuse, NY | #5 Cornell | 11–6 |
| 99 | April 10, 2012 | Ithaca, NY | #5 Cornell | 12–6 |
| 100 | April 10, 2013 | Syracuse, NY | #8 Syracuse | 13–12 |
| 101 | April 8, 2014 | Ithaca, NY | #7 Syracuse | 14–9 |
| 102 | February 15, 2015 | Syracuse, NY | #4 Syracuse | 14–6 |
| 103 | April 12, 2016 | Ithaca, NY | Cornell | 10–9^{OT} |
| 104 | April 11, 2017 | Syracuse, NY | #1 Syracuse | 15–8 |
| 105 | April 10, 2018 | Ithaca, NY | #11 Cornell | 13–8 |
| 106 | May 13, 2018 | Syracuse, NY | #8 Cornell | 10–9 |
| 107 | April 9, 2019 | Syracuse, NY | #11 Syracuse | 13–8 |
| 108 | April 11, 2022 | Syracuse, NY | #4 Cornell | 16–15 |
| 109 | April 2, 2024 | Ithaca, NY | #12 Cornell | 18–17^{2OT} |
| 110 | April 12, 2025 | Uniondale, NY | #1 Cornell | 17–12 |
Series: Syracuse leads 66–43–1
