= 2014 Atlantic Coast Conference men's lacrosse season =

The 2014 ACC men's and women's lacrosse conferences included six teams, up from four in 2013. Notre Dame and Syracuse joined the ACC in July 2013. This was the only year that the ACC men's lacrosse conference included these six teams as Maryland left the ACC for the Big Ten at the end of the 2014 season. The finalists from the 2013 NCAA championship game are in the ACC conference in 2014, Duke and Syracuse. Additionally, all six teams were included in the Top 10 of the Lacrosse Magazine preseason ranking. The 2014 ACC men's lacrosse conference included teams that at the time had won 23 national championships and had 45 appearances in the title game.

On May 4, 2014, the NCAA announced the 18 teams that played in the Division I men's lacrosse tournament. As part of this selection, the bottom four teams played two play-in games. The ACC is one of 10 conferences that have automatic qualifiers, meaning the winner of the ACC tournament appeared in the tournament, leaving five ACC teams competing for eight at-large bids. Four of the six teams in the ACC competed in the conference tournament on April 25, 2014. PPL Park (now Subaru Park) in Philadelphia, Pa., hosted the ACC tournament in both 2014 and 2015.

== ACC men's lacrosse team class composition ==
	Duke	Maryland	North Carolina	Notre Dame	Syracuse	UVA	All ACC
Freshmen	23%	29%	30%	24%	38%	31%	29%
Sophomores	35	27	20	22	23	19	24
Juniors	21	29	23	20	25	26	24
Seniors	21	16	27	33	14	24	22

== ACC teams with most "top 50" recruits in last three years ==
Team	2009 (upcoming seniors)	2010 (upcoming juniors)	2011 (upcoming sophomores)	2012 (upcoming freshman)	TOTAL (last four years)
UNC	8	5	9	7	29
UVA	5	6	4	5	20
Duke	3	3	5	5	16
Syracuse	4	4	1	5	14

*Inside Lacrosse

== NCAA tournament performance (last six years) ==
	Duke	Maryland	North Carolina	Notre Dame	Syracuse	UVA	Champion
2008	lost in final four to Johns Hopkins 9-10	lost in 2nd round to UVA 7-8	lost in 1st round to Navy 7-8	lost in 2nd round to Syracuse 9-11	won championship game over Johns Hopkins 13-10	lost in Final Four to Syracuse 11-12	SYRACUSE*
2009	lost in final four to Syracuse 7-17	lost in 2nd round to Syracuse 6-11	lost in 2nd round to Duke 11-12	lost in 1st round to Maryland 3-7	won championship game over Cornell 10-9	lost in Final Four to Cornell 6-15	SYRACUSE*
2010	won championship game over Notre Dame 6-5	lost in 2nd round to Notre Dame 5-7	lost in 2nd round to Duke 9-17	lost in finals to Duke 5-6	lost in 1st round to Army 8-9	lost in Final Four to Duke 13-14	DUKE
2011	lost in final four to Maryland 4-9	lost in finals to UVA 7-9	lost in 1st round to Maryland 6-13	lost in 2nd round to Duke 5-7	lost in 2nd round to Maryland 5-6	won championship game over Maryland 9-7	UVA
2012	lost in final four to Maryland 10-16	lost in finals to Loyola 3-9	lost in 1st round to Denver 14-16	lost in final four to Loyola 5-7	lost in 1st round to Duke 9-12	lost to Notre Dame in 2nd round 10-12	LOYOLA (MD)
2013	won championship game over Syracuse 16-10	lost in 1st round to Cornell 8-16	lost in 2nd round to Denver 12-11	lost in 2nd round to Duke 11-12	lost in championship game to Duke 10-16	not in tournament	DUKE

- * Note: Syracuse was not a member of the ACC for lacrosse in 2008 & 2009, they were independent

== 2014 MLL draft - ACC players ==
Pick	Name	School	Position
2/64	Jordan Wolf	Duke	Attack
4/64	Luke Duprey	Duke	LSM
7/64	Michael Ehrhardt	Maryland	D (Junior year), LSM (Senior year)
8/64	Scott McWilliams	Virginia	LSM (Junior year), D/LSM (Senior year)
11/64	Mike Chanenchuk	Maryland	Midfield
12/64	Ryan Creighton	North Carolina	Defensive Midfield
14/64	Brendan Fowler	Duke	FO
17/64	Rob Emery	Virginia	Midfield
18/64	Josh Dionne	Duke	Attack
21/64	Matt Harris	Syracuse	LSM (Junior year), D/LSM (Senior year)
27/64	Scott Loy	Syracuse	M
29/64	Nick Amato	Maryland	Goalie
29/64	Henry Lobb	Duke	D
39/64	Derek Maltz	Syracuse	Attack
49/64	RG Keenan	North Carolina	FO
50/64	Mark McNeill	North Carolina	Defensive Midfield
55/64	Chris Hipps	Duke	D
56/64	Mark Cockerton	Virginia	Attack
64/64	Brian Cooper	Maryland	D

== Returning All-Americans in the ACC ==
Duke_____________	2013 All-American team	Position___________	Class year in 2014	Note____________________
Brendan Fowler	1st team	Face-Off	Senior	2014 Preseason 1st team All-American
Jordan Wolf	2nd team	Attack	Senior	2014 Preseason 1st team All-American, #2 pick in 2014 MLL Draft
Josh Dionne	Honorable Mention	Attack	Senior	
Will Haus	Honorable Mention	Midfield	Junior	

Maryland_________	2013 All-American team	Position___________	Class year in 2014	Note____________________
Mike Chanenchuk	2nd team	Midfield	Senior	Ivy League rookie of the year in 2010 at Princeton, withdrew after first season
Michael Ehrhardt	2nd team	Defense	Senior	2014 Preseason 1st team All-American
Niko Amato	2nd team	Goalie	Senior	
Goran Murray	3rd team	Defense	Senior	

North Carolina___	2013 All-American team	Position___________	Class year in 2014	Note____________________
Chad Tutton	2nd team	Midfield	Junior	2014 Preseason 1st team All-American
Joey Sankey	3rd team	Attack	Junior	
Jimmy Bitter	Honorable mention	Attack	Junior	
Ryan Creighton	Honorable mention	Midfield	Senior	

Notre Dame_______	2013 All-American team	Position___________	Class year in 2014	Note____________________
Jim Marlatt	3rd team	Midfield	Senior	
Matt Kavanagh	Honorable Mention	Attack	Sophomore	

Syracuse_________	2013 All-American team	Position___________	Class year in 2014	Note____________________
Henry Schoonmaker	Honorable mention	Midfield	Redshirt Junior	

UVA______________	2013 All-American team	Position___________	Class year in 2014	Note____________________
Scott McWilliams	2nd team	Defense	Senior	
Mark Cockerton	3rd team	Attack	Senior	
Rob Emery	3rd team	Midfield	Senior	

== Next games ==
Non conference:
Duke (8–2, #3, 2-1 ACC) vs. Harvard (5–3, #18), Sunday, 3/29/14, 12pm
North Carolina (7–2, #5, 1-2 ACC) vs. Johns Hopkins (5–2, #9), Saturday, 3/29/14, 2pm

Conference:
Maryland (7–1, #4, 2-1 ACC) vs. Virginia (7–2, #8, 1-1 ACC), Sunday, 3/30/14, 12pm
Notre Dame (4–2, #7, 2-0 ACC) vs. Syracuse (4–3, #10, 0-3 ACC), 3/29/14, 12pm

== High School matrix ==
	Boys Latin, Md.	Calvert Hall, Md.	Chaminade, NY	Deerfield Academy, MA	St. Anthony's, NY
Duke	Christian Walsh, M Sr ('09)		Brian Dunne, D, Fr. Brendan Fowler, M Sr. Danny Fowler, G, Fr. Greg Rhodes, M, So. Thomas Zenker, M, Fr.	Luke Aaron, G Jr. Teddy Henderson, M, Fr. Christian Walsh, M Sr (PG '10)	
Maryland	Thomas Guarino, G Sr. Colin Heacock, A, Fr. Mac Pons, D, Fr.	Tyler Adelsberger, M Sr. John Belz, M, Fr.	Michael Ehrhardt, D Sr. Tim Muller, D, Fr.	None	Mike Chanenchuk, M Sr. Joe LoCascio, M Jr. Charlie Raffa, M Jr.
North Carolina	Pat Foster, A Sr. R.G. Keenan, M Sr.	Frankie Kelly, M Sr. Patrick Kelly, M, So. Stephen Kelly, M, Fr. Evan Connell, D, So.		Jimmy Bitter, A Jr. (on varsity lax three years)	Kieran Burke, G, So.
Notre Dame			Matt Kavanagh, A, So.		
Syracuse					
Virginia			Ryan Lukacovic, A, Fr.	Joe French, A, Fr. (PG'13); Alec Webster, D, Fr. (two years)	Greg Danseglio, D Jr.

== Regional matrix ==
	Canadians	Pennsylvania	Central NY, NY	Long Island, NY	Upstate, NY	Maryland	Virginia
Duke	(none)	Tanner Scott Jr., M, Conestoga; Will Haus Jr, M, Palmyra Area; Brian Dailey Jr, LSM, Conestoga; Jordan Wolf Sr, A, Lower Merion; Jamie Ikeda, So, D, Lower Merion; Henry Lobb Sr, D, Malvern Prep					
Maryland	Bryan Cole Jr, M, The Hill Academy	Casey Ikeda Jr., D, Conestoga; Tyler Brooke, So., A, Conestoga; Mike Bender Jr., LSM, Emmaus Bellarmine; Ryan Lehman, So., D, Garnet Valley; Matt Rambo, Fr., A, LaSalle College HS; Bradlee Lord, So., A, Conestoga; Kevin Forster Jr., A, LaSalle; Niko Amato Sr., G, LaSalle; Goran Murray Jr., D, Haverford; Chad Raffery, Fr., D, Malvern; Jon Garino Jr., So., M, Episcopal					
North Carolina	Chad Tutton Jr, M, The Hill Academy; Shane Simpson, Fr, M, Hamilton, Ontario then Salisbury	Ryan Creighton Sr., D-Mid, Malvern Prep. Ryan Kilpatrick Jr., D, Salesianum; Austin Pifani, Fr., D, Abington; Joe Sankey Jr., A, William Penn Charter	Jake Bailey Jr, D, McQuaid Jesuit; Drew Hays Jr, M, Fairport	Kieran Burke, So, G, St. Anthony's; Briam Balkam, Fr, G, Smithtown East; Mark Rizzo, RFr, D, Hewlett	Luke Goldstock, Fr, A, Niskayuna; Jack Lambert, John Jay		
Notre Dame	Kyle Trolley, So, M, from Ontario, played three years at Culver Academy (IN)	P.J. Finley, Fr, M, Malvern; Adam Goins, So, M, Conestoga; Westy Hopkins Sr, A, LaSalle; Conor Kelly Jr, G, Haverford; Liam O'Connor Sr, M, Haverford; Stephen O'Hara Sr, D, St. Joe's Prep; Jack Sheridan, So, D, Malvern					
Syracuse	Sean Young Jr, D, The Hill Academy; Randy Staats Jr, A/M, McKinnon Park	Matt Walters Jr, M, Haverford bobby Tait, RSo, D, Germantown					
Virginia	Matt Cockerton Sr, A, Monsignor Paul Dwyer; Joe French, Fr, A, St. Michael's then PG at Deerfield	Matt Barrett, Fr, G, Malvern; Bobby Hill Sr, M, Malvern; Joseph Lisicky Sr, D, Unionville		Ryan Lukacovic, Fr, A, Chaminade; Dan Marino, So, G, Garden City; Greg Danseglio Jr, D, St. Anthony's; James Pannell, So, A, Smithtown West	Greg Coholan, RSo, M, Irondequoit; Davi Sacco Jr, D, Jamesville DeWitt; Zed Williams, Fr, M, SIlver Creek	Ryan Tucker Jr, M, Gilman; Pat Harbeson Sr, M, DeMatha; Tyler German Jr, M, Queen Anne's; Pat Glading Sr, M, Georgetown Prep	Carlson Milikin, RFr, M, Woodberry Forrest; Owen Van Arsdale, RJr, A, St. Anne's Beifeld; Albert Kammler Jr, D, St. Alban's; Matt Robertson Sr, G, Salem

== Duke ==
In the 2013 season, Duke defeated Syracuse 16–10 to win the NCAA Division I Men's Lacrosse championship. 15 of the 25 players in the 2013 championship game played again for Duke in 2014. Attackman Jordan Wolf and face-off man Brendan Fowler were named pre-season first team All-Americans. Joining them on the list on the second team is Henry Lobb, senior defenseman. Honorable mentions are Josh Dionne (attack), Myles Jones (midfield), Will Haus (midfield), Luke Duprey (long-stick midfield) and Chris Hipps (defense). Face-off specialist Brendan Fowler was a first team All-American in 2013. In the four games in the NCAA tournament that year, he won 70% of his face-offs and gathered 10 ground balls per game. For the entire season he won 64% of his face-offs.

Duke's coaching staff places a priority on ground ball statistics in their post-game reviews. In comparison, Johns Hopkins had found that the four most important post-game statistical considerations are shooting percentage, your opponent's shooting percentage, your save percentage and your opponent's save percentage.

=== Duke starters ===
==== Attackmen ====
Starters	Other attackmen
Josh Dionne (#8), Sr., 5'7, 185	Chad Cohan (#4), So., started first game of 2014
Case Matheis (#9), So., 5'8, 160, missed first game of 2014	
Jordan Wolf (#31), Sr., 5'9, 170	

==== Midfield ====
First offensive midfield (last game)	Defensive midfield	Other midfielders (alphabetical)
Deemer Class, So., 5'11, 190, played all 21 games in 2013 on 2nd line, scored 10 points against Syracuse in March 2014	Brian Dailey Jr., 5'11, 170 (moved to short-stick defensive midfield after playing previous two seasons as a long-stick midfielder)	Jack Bruckner, Fr., 6'1, 197 (started first four games in 2014)
Myles Jones, So., 6'4, 240, started fifth game in 2014, started five games at midfield in 2013, only two players in the ACC are heavier than Myles Jones: Freshman Matt Lane (attack, 252 lbs ) at Syracuse and redshirt Freshman Tyler Avallone (goalie, 262 lbs) at Syracuse, completed post graduate year at Salisbury School in 2012 after four years at Walt Whitman in Long Island	Will Haus Jr.	Kyle Keenan Jr. (U.S. Under 19 National Team in 2012)
Christian Walsh Sr., 6'1, 202, started 2013 at attack before moving to first midfield line, played at Boys Latin before a post graduate year at Deerfield	Greg Rhodes, So.	Tom Zenker, Fr., 6'3, 205

==== Long-Stick Midfield ====
Primary_________________	Year________	Height	Weight	Note
Luke Duprey, Captain	Senior	6'5"	210	Selected 4th in 2014 MLL draft
Ethan Powley	Fr.	6'2	195	

==== Defense ====
Started last game	Other defensemen (alphabetical)
Casey Carroll (#37), RSr, 6'0, 182 lbs, U.S. Army Ranger from 2007 to 2012, first-team All-American in 2007, ACC Defensive Player of the Week after first week of season, matched up against Pat Foster (#41) in UNC game and held Foster to one shot and no goals or assists while recording three caused turnovers	Jamie Ikeda (#33), So., 6'3, 180 lbs, started first five games
Chris Hipps (#13), Sr., 6'4, 211 lbs, started 58 of 60 games in the previous three seasons, Captain, first game in 2014 was the sixth game	
Henry Lobb (#77), Sr., 6'4, 205 lbs, started 36 of 39 games in the previous two seasons, out with leg injury first two games of 2014, selected 31st in 2014 MLL draft	

==== Face Off ====
Primary_________________	Year________	Height	Weight	Note
Brendan Fowler (#3)	Senior	6'0"	210	Set career high in ground balls in first game in 2014 with 16

Year	Player	Faceoffs won	Total faceoffs	% faceoffs won	Ground balls/game
2014 (through first seven games)	Fowler Sr.	98	153	64.1%	8.57
2013	Fowler Jr.	339	526	64.4%	9.95
2012	Fowler, So.	90	149	60.4%	2.00
2011	Fowler, Fr.	86	155	55.5%	2.44

==== Goalkeeper ====
Primary_________________	Year________	Height	Weight	Note
Luke Aaron (#2)	So.	6'1"	190	Started five of first seven games in 2014, on Deerfield varsity lacrosse team for four years
Kyle Turri (#1)	Junior	6'3"	170	Played in five of first seven games in 2014

== Maryland ==
In 2013, Maryland lost to Cornell in the first round of the NCAA Division I Men's Lacrosse Championship tournament.

=== Maryland starters ===
==== Attackmen ====
Starters in last game	Other attackmen
Connor Cannizzaro (#23), Fr., 5'10, 170, #8 recruit in 2013, started first eight games at midfield, ninth at attack	Jay Carlson (#32), Jr., 6'0, 185
Matt Rambo (#15), Fr., 5'10, 195, #2 recruit in 2013	Kevin Forster (#27), Jr., 6'1, 185, missed 2013 due to injury
Tim Rotanz (#20), Fr., 6'1, 190, #3 recruit in 2013, did not play in first four games due to a leg injury, started in the fifth game and scored two goals	

==== Midfield ====
First offensive midfield starters in first game	Other midfielders
Mike Chanenchuk (#1), Sr., 5'11, 180, Captain, scored five goals against Duke on 3/1/14, split time in first five games in 2014 between midfield and attack, had four goals on 17 shots in fifth game, has a point in 30 straight games	Tyler Adelsberger (#12), RSr., 6'1, 200, captain
Joe LoCascio (#5), Jr., 5'9, 180	Colin Heacock (#41), Fr., 6'3, 195
Henry West (#38), So., 6'0, 180, started ninth game on first offensive midfield after playing in previous eight	

==== Long-Stick Midfield ====
Primary_________________	Year________	Height	Weight	Note
Michael Ehrhardt (#28), Captain	Senior	6'5	220	#7 pick in 2014 MLL draft, starter on close defense in 2012 and 2013, pre-season first team All-American

==== Defense ====
Starters_________________	Year________	Height	Weight	Note
Matt Dunn (#33)	So.	6'3	215	Started one game in 2013
Casey Ikeda (#3)	Junior	6'1	175	Started all 14 games in 2013, brother Jamie is a defender on the Duke lacrosse team
Goran Murray (#44)	Junior	6'0	175	Two-year returning starter, started all games his freshman season

==== Face Off ====
Primary_________________	Year________	Height	Weight	Note
Jon Garino (#50),	So.	5'10	180	16/34 (47.1%), played in five of seven games, 1.6 ground balls per game
Charlie Raffa (#7)	Junior	6'1	195	Won 19/26 face-offs against Syracuse (73%), recovered 11 ground balls and scored two goals, won 67% of his face-offs in first three games of season, did not play in seventh game, 67/112 (59.8%), 7.8 ground balls per game

==== Goalkeeper ====
Primary_________________	Year________	Height	Weight	Note
Niko Amato (#31), captain	Redshirt Senior	5'8	185	All-ACC in 2011, 2012 and 2013; All-American in 2012 and 2013; 2014 Preseason 2nd Team All-American

==== Amato's statistics ====
Statistic	2011	2012	2013	2014
Games played/games started/total games	18/18/18	18/18/18	14/14/14	4/4/4
Saves/game	9.2	8.7	10.9	10.8
Opponent Shots/game	27.7	29.1	31.8	29.8
Shots on goal/game	16.8	16.7	19.7	17.0
SOG/shots	60.6%	57.3%	62.0%	57.0%
Saves/SOG	54.6%	52.0%	55.3%	63.2%

== North Carolina ==
North Carolina was the only men's lacrosse team in the ACC that had not been to either the final four or the championship game in the last three years. In fact, UNC had not been to the final four of the NCAA championship tournament since 1993. In 2013, UNC lost to Denver in the second round of the NCAA tournament. Before that, UNC won the ACC tournament for the first time since in 17 years.

The 2014 North Carolina Tar Heels men's lacrosse team represented the University of North Carolina at Chapel Hill in the 2014 National Collegiate Athletic Association (NCAA) Division I men's lacrosse season. The head coach, UNC alumnus Joe Breschi, coached UNC for his 6th year. Breschi was previously a first-team All-American defenseman in 1990 and a USA national team member in 1990 and 1994.

UNC returned seven out of ten players from its 2013 starting lineup. Four midfielders on the 2014 team were on the roster of the U19 USA team in 2012: Brent Armstrong (sophomore), Stephen Kelly (freshman), Steven Pontrello (sophomore) and Michael Tagliaferri (sophomore). UNC and UVA had the most players on the 2012 U19 team, both with four. Returning faceoff man R.G. Keenan was a first-team All-American in 2012. ACC coaches named attackman Joey Sankey to the 2013 All-ACC team. Senior defensive midfielder Mark McNeill also plays wide receiver on the UNC football team.

Senior midfielder Frankie Kelly and sophomore attackman Patrick Kelly are cousins. Their uncle, Bryan Kelly (UNC 1991), coached them in high school at Calvert Hall in Baltimore, Maryland. Frankie Kelly is freshman Stephen Kelly's older brother. Frankie (UNC 2014) and Stephen Kelly (UNC 2017) are brothers and sons of Frank Kelly, III, who played lacrosse at Cornell. Frank Kelly, III has two brothers that played lacrosse at UNC and both won championships at UNC: David Kelly (UNC 1989) and Bryan Kelly (UNC 1991). Both played on the UNC lacrosse team with current head coach Joe Breschi. Patrick Kelly (UNC 2015) is a cousin of Frankie and Stephen Kelly. His father David Kelly (UNC 1989) won a lacrosse championship in 1986. His uncle on his mother's side (Ken Miller) played football at UNC.

In other family relations, Junior attackman Jimmy Bitter's older brother Billy Bitter was a first-team All-American for UNC in 2009 and 2010. Sophomore midfielder Jake Matthai's dad played on the UNC lacrosse team from 1975 to 1979. Sophomore goalkeeper Kieran Burke's two older brothers played lacrosse at UNC, Brian (2005–08), a defenseman, and Sean (2007–10), a midfielder.

UNC had the most recruits in the Inside Lacrosse top 50 rankings for the last two years. UNC had seven players on the Inside Lacrosse top 50 list in 2012 versus nine in 2011. In total, UNC had 16 players in the top 50 lists in the last two years. The next highest count was Duke University with 10.

Stephen Kelly signed a National Letter of Intent with Carolina in November 2012 and enrolled in UNC after he graduated high school in August 2013. Kelly was the only rising senior in high school that made the U19 U.S. Team in 2012 - the rest of the team had already graduated high school.

=== UNC recruits in Top 50 ===
Name	Position	High school	Top 50 rank*
Stephen Kelly	Midfield	Calvert Hall (Md.)	#2
Austin Pifani	Defense	Abington (Pa.)	#14
Tate Jozokos	Midfield	Governor's Academy (Mass.)	#28
Jack Lambert	Defense	John Jay (N.Y.)	#29
Shane Simpson	Attack/midfield	Salisbury (Conn.)	#33
Brian Balkam	Goalie	Smithtown East (N.Y.)	#49
Ryan Macri	Defense	Governor's Academy (Mass.)	#50

*Inside Lacrosse

==== UNC players on 2014 team on "Top 50" recruit list ====
Freshmen	Sophomores	Juniors	Seniors
Stephen Kelly, midfield, #2	Spencer Parks, midfield, #4	Jimmy Bitter, attack, #2	Mark McNeill, midfield, #3
Austin Pifani, defense, #14	Steve Pontrello, midfield, #5	Joey Sankey, attack, #6	Will Campbell, midfield, #13
Tate Jozokos, midfield, #28	Patrick Kelly, attack, #7	Brian Sullivan, defense, #7	Duncan Hutchins, midfield, #14
Jack Lambert, defense, #29	Michael Tagliaferri, midfield, #16	Ryan Kilpatrick, defense, #21	Patrick Foster, midfield, #20
Shane Simpson, attack, #33	Evan Connell, defense, #18	Walker Chafee, midfield, #49	T.J. Kemp, midfield, #29
Brian Balkam, goalie, #49	Jake Matthai, midfield, #20		Connor Hunt, defense, #34
Ryan Macri, defense, #50	Kieran Burke, goalie, #29		R.G. Keenan, face off, #38
	Brian Sherlock, midfield (transferred to Loyola)		Andrew O'Connell, goalie, #17
	Zach Powers, defense, #40		

*Inside Lacrosse

=== UNC depth chart ===
==== Attackmen ====
Starters in last game	Other players that started a game at attack
Jimmy Bitter (#4), Jr., did not play in first game (ankle), played in second	Luke Goldstock (#1), Fr., in man-up unit, started in one of UNC's scrimmages
Pat Foster (#41), Sr.	Spencer Parks (#19), So., started first four games of season at attack
Joey Sankey (#11), Jr.	Steve Pontrello (#29), So., started in Princeton game in place of Parks

Year	Player	Goals/game	Assists/game	GB/game	Turnovers/game
2014 (through first eight games)	Bitter Jr.	2.1	1.0	2.4	0.9
2013	Bitter, So.	1.9	1.2	1.9	1.3
2012	Bitter, Fr.	1.6	0.8	1.2	1.4

Year	Player	Goals/game	Assists/game	GB/game	Turnovers/game
2014 (through first six games)	Sankey Jr.	2.1	1.8	2.8	2.5
2013	Sankey, So.	2.1	1.2	2.5	1.6
2012	Sankey, Fr.	1.3	1.3	1.6	1.2

==== Midfield ====
First offensive midfield (last game)	Second offensive midfield	In face-off wing rotation	In man-up offense rotation	In defensive midfield rotation
Steve Pontrello (#29), So., 5'8, 190, 2012 U-19 USA team	Patrick Kelly (#2), So., 5'10, 175, played attack in high school	Evan Connell (#99), So.	Walker Chafee (#18), Jr.	Ryan Creighton (#33), Sr. (captain)
Shane Simpson (#22), Fr., 6'2, 170, three shots and three goals in second game, started third game, from Hamilton, Canada	Spencer Parks (#19), So.	Jake Bailey (#40), Jr.	Spencer Parks (#19), So	Jake Matthai (#6), So.
Chad Tutton (#12), Jr., 6'0, 200, from Courtice, Canada, 83 miles from where Shane Simpson grew up	Michael Tagliaferri (#21), RFr., 6'0, 205, 2012 U-19 USA team, redshirted in 2013 with shoulder injury, two-time California lacrosse player of the year, on varsity football and lacrosse teams for four years in high school	Ryan Kilpatrick (#15), Jr.	Chad Tutton (#12), Jr.	Greg McBride (#3), Sr. (captain)
		Mark McNeill (#43), Sr.		Mark McNeill (#43), Sr.

Other midfielders on roster (played in last game)	Other midfielders that played in season (did not play in last game)
Brent Armstrong (#47), So. (2012 U-19 USA team)	Will Campbell (#23), Sr.
Drew Hays (#44), Jr.	Brett Bedard (#35), Fr.
Duncan Hutchins (#32), Sr.	Joe Costigan (#5), RSo.
Frankie Kelly (#14), Sr.	Derek Henson (#9), Jr.
	Tate Jozokos (#28), Fr.
	Peyton Klawinski (#42), Fr.
	Campbell Wood (#7), RSr. (captain)

==== Face-off ====
Took a face-off in 2014	Won-loss (%)	Ground balls per game	Note
Brett Armstrong (#47), So.	9-25 (36.0%)	0.6	
R.G. Keenan (#25), Sr.	11-23 (47.8%)	1.7	Played in first and eighth game, had an undisclosed leg injury
Frankie Kelly (#14), Sr.	32-61 (52.5%)	2.2	14/18 on face-offs in second game
Stephen Kelly (#24), Fr.	74-121 (61.2%)	5.9	Had 13 ground balls against Princeton, won 15/26 face-offs (57.7%)
Ryan Kilpatrick (#15), Jr.	0-2 (0.0%)	1.4	LSM

==== Long-stick midfielder rotation (last game) ====
Name	Note
Connor Hunt (#50), Sr., 6'3, 215	Had two penalties in Harvard game
Ryan Kilpatrick (#15), Jr., 6'0, 190	
Zach Powers (#77), So., 6'1, 180	

==== Defense ====
Starters (last game)
Jake Bailey (#40), Jr.
Austin Pifani (#17), Fr., ACC Defensive Player of the Week on 3/25/14 after holding Maryland's Matt Rambo to no points and 0-7 shooting
Jordan Smith (#31), Sr., matched up against Jordan Wolf in Duke loss and Wolf had four goals on nine shots, marked Mike Chanenchuk in Maryland win and Chanenchuk had one goal on four shots and two turnovers

==== Close defense statistics (starters) versus prior season ====
Statistic	2012 season	2013 season	2014 season
Ground balls/game	5.1	6.2	4.0
Caused turnovers/game	2.1	3.7	1.7
Opponents' shots per game	32.7	36.9	22.7
Opponents' shots on goal per game	20.2	22.0	12.7
Opponents' shots on goal/shots	61.9%	59.6%	55.9%

==== Goalkeeper ====
Starter	Backukps
Kiernan Burke, So.	Duncan Saunders, RFr.
	Bradley Dunn Sr.

==== UNC goalkeeper statistics versus prior season ====
Statistic	2013 season	2014 season
Saves/game	12.1	9.9
Shots on goal/game	22.0	17.1
Save %	54.8%	57.7%

==== 2014 Injuries and missed games ====
Name	Note
R.G. Keenan (#25), Sr., Face-Off	Appeared in first game, then missed next six games, played in eighth, ninth and tenth games
Evan Connell (#99), So., 6'0, 185, LSM	Missed Harvard, Maryland and Johns Hopkins games with undisclosed leg injury after appearing in all previous games at LSM. In 2013 started 14 of 17 games at close defense, 2014 pre-season honorable mention All-American, switched to LSM in 2014, team leader in ground balls after two games.
Greg McBride (#3), Sr., D-Mid	Did-not-play in Johns Hopkins game after playing in all nine previous games
Michael Tagliaferri (#21), RFr., 6'0, 205, M	Did-not-play in Maryland or Johns Hopkins game after playing in all eight previous games
Stephen Kelly (#24), Fr., Face-Offs	Had surgery on a broken wrist on 3/24/14; out for season
Jack Lambert (#34), Fr., Defense	Took a redshirt medical season after tearing ACL in 2nd game of season

== Notre Dame ==
In 2013, Notre Dame lost to Duke in the second round of the Division I Men's Lacrosse Championship tournament.

=== Notre Dame starters ===
==== Attackmen ====
Starters in first game	Year________	Height	Weight	Note
Conor Doyle (#28)	Junior	5'11	161	
Westy Hopkins	Sr.	6'1	180	Played midfield in 2013, attack in 2011 and 2012
Matt Kavanagh (#50)	Sophomore	5'8	170	

==== Midfield ====
First offensive midfield	Other midfielders
Trevor Brosco, So., 5'9, 185	
Jim Marlatt (#5), Sr. 6'1, 180, captain	Will Corrigan (#17), Jr., 5'10, 178, head coach's son
Sergio Perkovic (#16), Fr., 6'4, 220: started every game, leads midfielders in scoring, takes 5.4 shots a game, on varsity lacrosse for four years in high school and won four state titles, Michigan lacrosse player of the year as a junior and senior	

==== Long-Stick Midfield ====
Primary_________________	Year________	Height	Weight
Ryan Smith (#14)	Sr.		

==== Defense ====
Starters_________________	Year________	Height	Weight	Note
Brian Buglione (#25)	Senior	6'4	210	Started all games in 2013, led team in caused turnovers
Matt Landis (#43)	So.	6'2	195	Long-stick midfielder in 2013
Stephen O'Hara (#4)	Senior	6'1	195	Captain, Preseason First Team All-American, started all games in 2013, defended #11 Joey Sankey in game against UNC on 3/1/14 and Sankey had five turnovers and one goal

==== Face Off ====
Primary_________________	Year________	Height	Weight
Liam O'Connor (#31)	Senior	6'0	190
Nick Ossello (#20)	Junior	6'1	185
Trevor Brosco (#34)	Sophomore	5'9	185

==== Goalkeeper ====
Primary_________________	Year________	Height	Weight
2013 started graduated (John Kemp)			

== Syracuse ==
In 2013, Syracuse lost to Duke in the finals of the Division I Men's Lacrosse Championship tournament.

=== Syracuse starters ===
==== Attackmen ====
Starters in last game (Johns Hopkins)	Started every game season-to-date (3/17/14)	Started at least one-game season-to-date	Other attack
Dylan Donahue (#17), RSo., 5'9, 178, rotated as starter in 2013 with Billy Ward, son of assistant coach	Donahue (#17)	Randy Staats (#45), Jr., 6'2, 185 lbs, played previous two seasons at Onondaga Community College (OCC), set OCC record in points in 2013, played for Iroquois Nationals in 2012 U-19 tournament, alternated between attack and midfield in first two games, did not play in last two games due to leg injury	Billy Ward (#3), Sr., 5'9, 174, team captain, rotated as starter in 2013 with Donahue
Derek Maltz (#7), Sr., 6'3, 193, team captain for second year, father on Syracuse's 1983 NCAA title team	Rice (#2)		
Kevin Rice (#2), Jr., 5'8, 170			

==== Midfield ====
First offensive midfield	Defensive midfield (SSDM)	In face-off wing rotation	Other midfielders (alphabetical)
Scott Loy (#33), Sr., 6'2, 220 lbs	Tom Grimm (#32), RSo., 5'11, 185	Henry Schoonmaker (#77), RJr., 6'1, 206	Jordan Evans (#22), Fr., 5'9, 166 lbs, #1 recruit in Class of 2013, did not play in last game due to leg injury
Hakeem Lecky (#8), RJr., 5'10, 175 lbs, 2014 team co-captain, started all 17 games at midfield in 2012, 2nd midfield in 2013		Peter Macartney (#28), RJr., 6'1, 186, LSM	Nicky Galasso (#5), RJr., 6'0, 200 lbs, transfer from North Carolina, medical redshirt in 2013, third team All-American in 2011, did not play in first two games of 2014
Henry Schoonmaker (#77), RJr., 6'1, 206, Honorable Mention All-American in 2013 as second-line midfielder, scored last goal in regulation and game-winner in overtime against Albany in 2014			Niko Manning (#46), Jr., 5'11, 180 lbs, spent two seasons at Onondaga Community College (OCC)
			Randy Staats (#45), Jr., 6'2, 185 lbs, played previous two seasons at Onondaga Community College (OCC), set OCC record in points in 2013, played for Iroquois Nationals in 2012 U-19 tournament, alternated between attack and midfield in first game

==== Long-Stick Midfield ====
2013 returners	Year________	Height	Weight	Note
Scott Firman (#29)	Fr.	5'10	185	
Peter Macartney (#28)	RJr.	6'1	186	

==== Defense ====
Starters in last game (Johns Hopkins)	Started every game season to date (3/17/14)	Started at least one-game season to date
Brandon Mullins (#11), RSo., 6'2, 212, started two games in 2013 before injuring knee, played in every game in his Freshman season and started in 10 of 17, recorded an assist against Albany after faking a flip to his goalie, pre-season honorable mention All American	Brandon Mullins (#11), RSo., 6'2, 212	Jay McDermott (#88), So., 6'2, 184, started fifth game
Matt Harris (#44), Sr., 6'2, 221, Team captain, 21st selection in 2014 MLL draft	Sean Young (#27), Jr., 6'2, 204	Ryan Palasek (#81), 6'1, 223
Sean Young (#27), Jr., 6'2, 204, started last 16 games of 2013 season, defended Miles Thompson in Albany game, pre-season second team All American		Bobby Tait (#40), RSo., 6'5, 212, five ground balls in last scrimmage, man-down unit in 2013

==== Face Off ====
Name_________________	Year________	Height	Weight	Note
Chris Daddio (#1)	Senior	5'10"	184	45% win rate on 254 faceoffs in 2013
Mike Iacono (#18)	Junior	6'5	225	Played previous two seasons at Nassau Community College, won 78% of his faceoffs
Cal Paduda (#41)	Sophomore	5'8	180	42% win rate on 111 faceoffs in 2013, did not play in first game in 2014

==== Goalkeeper ====
Primary_________________	Year________	Height	Weight	Note
Dom Lamolinara (#50)	Senior	6'2"	181	Was a freshman at Maryland in 2011 before transferring to Syracuse
Bobby Wardwell	Junior			Played in second half of first two games

== Virginia ==
In 2013, Virginia did not make the Division I Men's Lacrosse Championship tournament for the first time since 2004. UVA led Division I lacrosse teams in ground balls per game in 2013 with 39.93/game. That average is down in the first three games of 2014 at 36/game.

=== Virginia starters ===
==== Attackmen ====
Starters	Note
Mark Cockerton Sr.	Scored game-winning goal at Drexel on 2/16/14
James Pannell, So.	Seven goals against Syracuse on 3/1/14
Owen Van Arsdale Jr.	
Ryan Lukacovic, Fr.	Scored 2 goals against Johns Hopkins, including the game-tying goal on 3/22/14

==== Midfield ====
1st offensive midfield	Face-off midfield	Other midfielders (alphabetical)
Greg Coholan (#1), RSo.	Chris LaPierre, RSr. (#2 pick in 2013 MLL Draft, All-American in 2011 and 2012, medical redshirt in 2013)	Tyler German (#12), Jr.
Rob Emery (#24), Senior, captain	Joe Lisicky (#46), Sr. (long-stick midfielder)	Pat Harbeson (#11), Senior
Ryan Tucker (#3), Jr.,	Mick Parks Jr. (face-off X)	Bobby Hill, Senior, captain
		Ryan Lukacovic (#5), Freshman
		Blake Riley (#25), Senior
		Zed Williams (#45), Fr., 6'2, 185, broke national career high school records for goals and points, on high school varsity team in 8th grade, member of Seneca tribe, sometimes played midfield for entire games with no substitution, started on first offensive midfield in second game of season
		Zach Wood (#34), Sophomore

==== Long-Stick Midfielders ====
Name (alphabetical)	Year________	Height	Weight	Note
Albert Kammler	Jr.	6'2	200	
Joe Lisicky	RSr.	6'2	205	Division III First Team All-American in 2012 @ Lynchburg
Tanner Ottenbreit	Junior	6'1	185	appeared in all games in 2013 as LSM

==== Defense ====
Starters_________________	Year________	Height	Weight	Note
Greg Danseglio	Junior	6'0	185	
Scott McWilliams (captain)	Senior	6'3	205	Started on close defense as a freshman, played LSM in final three games of 2013
Tanner Scales	Sophomore	6'2	200	2013 ACC Freshman of the Year

==== Face Off ====
Name	Year	Height	Weight	Note
Tyler German (#12)	Junior	6'0	200	0/1 in first game
Jeff Kratky (#19)	Freshman	6'0	180	3/8 in second game
Nate Menninger (#47)	Sophomore	6'1	220	Long-stick face-off man, transfer from Hamilton
Mick Parks (#26)	Junior	5'11	175	15/27 in first game, 56% win rate, 11 ground balls in first game matched career high

==== Goalkeeper ====
Name	Year	Height	Weight	Note
Matt Barrett	Freshman	6'0	220	Started first game in 2014
Rhody Heller	Senior	6'1	190	Started nine of 11 games in 2013

== Face-Off Matrix ==
Team	Duke	Maryland	North Carolina	Notre Dame	Syracuse	Virginia
Duke	N/A	2013: Raffa won 11/17 (65%) faceoffs versus Fowler and other Duke players and recovered 8 ground balls. Fowler was 9/22 (41%) with 10 ground balls. Played against each other in high school, with Raffa's St. Anthony's (NY) team annually playing Fowler's Chaminade (NY) team in the Long Island Catholic league. Fowler won the 2010 Nassau Suffolk Catholic High School Athletic Association (NSCHSAA) Face-off Midfielder of the Year; Raffa won the 2011 NSCHSAA Face-off Midfielder of the Year	2013 Game 1: Duke's Fowler won 17/23 (73.9%) and had 13 GBs in 11–8 win; UNC was 6/23 (26.1%) with Keenan 5/15 (33.3%); 2013 Game 2: Duke's Fowler won 25/38 (65.8%) and had 15 GBs in 17–18 loss; Keenan was 11/33 (33.3%) with 5 GBs; 2012 Game 1: Fowler was 3/5 (60%) in 13–11 win; Keenan was 10/26 (38.5%) with 8 GBs; 2012 Game 2: Fowler was 0/1 in 12–9 win; Keenan was 17/25 (68.0%) with 11 GBs; 2011: Duke was 9/27 (33.3%) in win; Keenan was 18/27 (66.7%)			
Maryland	2013: Raffa won 11/17 (65%) faceoffs versus Fowler and other Duke players and recovered 8 ground balls. Fowler was 9/22 (41%) with 10 ground balls. Played against each other in high school, with Raffa's St. Anthony's (NY) team annually playing Fowler's Chaminade (NY) team in the Long Island Catholic league. Fowler won the 2010 Nassau Suffolk Catholic High School Athletic Association (NSCHSAA) Face-off Midfielder of the Year; Raffa won the 2011 NSCHSAA Face-off Midfielder of the Year	N/A				
North Carolina	2013 Game 1: Duke's Fowler won 17/23 (73.9%) and had 13 GBs in 11–8 win; UNC was 6/23 (26.1%) with Keenan 5/15 (33.3%); 2013 Game 2: Duke's Fowler won 25/38 (65.8%) and had 15 GBs in 17–18 loss; Keenan was 11/33 (33.3%) with 5 GBs; 2012 Game 1: Fowler was 3/5 (60%) in 13–11 win; Keenan was 10/26 (38.5%) with 8 GBs; 2012 Game 2: Fowler was 0/1 in 12–9 win; Keenan was 17/25 (68.0%) with 11 GBs; 2011: Duke was 9/27 (33.3%) in win; Keenan was 18/27 (66.7%)		N/A	2013: Jr. Liam O'Connor won 17/25 (68%) and had nine ground balls against UNC in a 10-9 3OT victory 2011: Fr. Liam O'Connor was 2/8 (25%) and had two ground balls against UNC in an 8-9 OT loss; Fr. R.G. Keenan won 15/21 (71%) and had 11 ground balls		
Notre Dame			2013: Jr. Liam O'Connor won 17/25 (68%) and had nine ground balls against UNC in a 10-9 3OT victory 2011: Fr. Liam O'Connor was 2/8 (25%) and had two ground balls against UNC in an 8-9 OT loss; Fr. R.G. Keenan won 15/21 (71%) and had 11 ground balls	N/A		
Syracuse					N/A	
Virginia						N/A
