= Michael Springer =

American lacrosse player

Personal information
- Nationality: American
- Born: August 4, 1979 (age 47) Pittsburgh, Pennsylvania, U.S.
- Height: 6 ft 3 in (191 cm)
- Weight: 220 lb (100 kg; 15 st 10 lb)

Sport
- Position: Attack
- Shoots: Right
- NLL draft: 61st overall, 2003; Philadelphia Wings
- MLL team: Philadelphia Barrage
- Former NCAA team: Syracuse University
- Pro career: 2004–

Michael Springer (born August 4, 1979) is a lacrosse player and coach who played for the Philadelphia Barrage of Major League Lacrosse. Springer was a four-time All-American playing for the Syracuse Orange men's lacrosse team. He now coaches varsity lacrosse at Don Bosco Preparatory High School.

Springer was born in Pittsburgh and raised in Ridgewood, New Jersey. He was a two-time All-American at Ridgewood High School.

== Major League Lacrosse ==
Springer was drafted by the Philadelphia Barrage in 2003. He made an immediate impact with the team netting 20 goals as a rookie and continued to contribute to the team. In 2006, he was awarded with Offensive Player of the Week in Week Five of the season. In addition, Springer has helped the Barrage to win three Steinfeld Cup championships in 2004, 2006, and 2007.
