= Cornell–Hobart lacrosse rivalry =

College sports rivalry

- Cornell Big Red
- First meeting: May 5, 1898; Hobart 2, Cornell 1
- Latest meeting: February 24, 2026; Cornell 19, Hobart 8
- Next meeting: TBD

Statistics
- Total meetings: 142
- All-time series: Cornell: 92–46–4
- Largest victory: Cornell, 20–2 (1968)
- Longest win streak: Cornell, 12 (2004–2016)
- Current win streak: Cornell, 7 (2018–present)

The Cornell–Hobart rivalry is an intercollegiate lacrosse rivalry between the Cornell Big Red, which represent Cornell University, and the Hobart Statesmen, which represent Hobart College. It is one of the oldest rivalries in college lacrosse; the inaugural game in the series was played on May 5, 1898, with Hobart prevailing by a score of 2–1. The game is the oldest ongoing college lacrosse series. The Johns Hopkins–Maryland lacrosse rivalry began in 1895, but the teams only played 7 times before 1924.

In 1995, Hobart promoted its team from Division III to Division I to preserve the lacrosse rivalry with Cornell and a similar one with the Syracuse Orange. In 2008, the continuation of the series was put in jeopardy when the Hobart Board of Trustees decided to reclassify its lacrosse program back to the Division III level on April 26. After an emotional reaction from the alumni community, however, the decision was reversed on May 1. The following day, Cornell played the first night game at Hobart's Boswell Field, in which the #8 Big Red beat the Statesmen by a score of 15 to 7.

Like Cornell, Hobart has never awarded athletic scholarships, and could not after the men's lacrosse program moved to Division I in 1995 due to NCAA policy. Unlike Johns Hopkins, which was grandfathered, Statesmen lacrosse is one of only five Division III programs to compete in Division I without athletic scholarships.

== Rival accomplishments ==
The following summarizes the accomplishments of the two programs.

Team	Cornell Big Red	Hobart Statesmen
Pre-NCAA National Titles	5	1
NCAA National Titles	4	15*
NCAA Final Four Appearances	15	20*
NCAA Tournament Appearances	31	26*
NCAA Tournament Record	33–25	55–11*
Conference Tournament Titles	3	1
Conference Championships	34	3
Tewaarton Award Recipients	3	0
Lt. Raymond Enners Award Recipients	6	0
Consensus First Team All-Americans	55	13
All-time Program Record	826–502–27	788–512–20
All-time Winning Percentage	.620	.605

- 21 of Hobart's NCAA tournament appearances and all 15 titles came at either the NCAA Division II or III level.

== Game Results ==
Cornell victories	Hobart victories	Tie games

No.	Date	Location	Winner	Score
1	May 5, 1898	Ithaca, NY	Hobart	2–1
2	June 11, 1898	Ithaca, NY	Cornell	3–1
3	April 22, 1899	Geneva, NY	Cornell	11–0
4	April 29, 1899	Ithaca, NY	Cornell	7–1
5	April 28, 1900	Ithaca, NY	Cornell	2–1
6	May 5, 1900	Geneva, NY	Cornell	3–1
7	April 27, 1901	Geneva, NY	Cornell	2–0
8	May 16, 1901	Ithaca, NY	Cornell	5–0
9	May 22, 1901	Geneva, NY	Cornell	5–2
10	April 24, 1902	Ithaca, NY	Cornell	6–2
11	May 17, 1902	Geneva, NY	Hobart	3–2
12	April 22, 1903	Ithaca, NY	Hobart	2–1
13	April 27, 1903	Geneva, NY	Hobart	4–3
14	May 12, 1904	Geneva, NY	Hobart	5–1
15	June 3, 1904	Ithaca, NY	Cornell	4–2
16	May 5, 1905	Geneva, NY	Tie	3–3
17	May 9, 1905	Ithaca, NY	Cornell	9–0
18	May 17, 1906	Geneva, NY	Hobart	6–0
19	June 2, 1906	Ithaca, NY	Hobart	5–1
20	April 25, 1907	Ithaca, NY	Cornell	3–2
21	June 1, 1907	Geneva, NY	Cornell	4–3
22	May 9, 1908	Geneva, NY	Tie	3–3
23	May 23, 1908	Ithaca, NY	Cornell	8–7
24	May 14, 1910	Geneva, NY	Cornell	7–4
25	May 28, 1910	Ithaca, NY	Cornell	14–2
26	May 30, 1911	Ithaca, NY	Cornell	9–5
27	May 4, 1912	Geneva, NY	Cornell	5–4
28	May 25, 1912	Ithaca, NY	Cornell	6–3
29	April 19, 1913	Ithaca, NY	Cornell	11–0
30	May 17, 1913	Geneva, NY	Cornell	7–4
31	April 18, 1914	Geneva, NY	Cornell	6–2
32	May 9, 1914	Ithaca, NY	Cornell	16–0
33	April 17, 1915	Ithaca, NY	Cornell	6–0
34	May 1, 1915	Geneva, NY	Hobart	4–2
35	May 13, 1916	Ithaca, NY	Cornell	16–3
36	April 24, 1920	Geneva, NY	Tie	2–2
37	May 15, 1920	Ithaca, NY	Cornell	3–2
38	May 24, 1921	Geneva, NY	Hobart	4–3
39	April 28, 1922	Ithaca, NY	Cornell	5–4
40	May 12, 1923	Geneva, NY	Hobart	8–2
41	May 3, 1924	Ithaca, NY	Cornell	3–2
42	May 9, 1925	Geneva, NY	Hobart	7–4
43	May 14, 1927	Geneva, NY	Cornell	3–0
44	May 5, 1928	Ithaca, NY	Cornell	5–1
45	May 11, 1929	Geneva, NY	Hobart	5–0
46	May 10, 1930	Ithaca, NY	Cornell	5–1
47	May 9, 1931	Geneva, NY	Cornell	4–1
48	May 7, 1932	Ithaca, NY	Cornell	6–0

No.	Date	Location	Winner	Score
49	April 22, 1933	Ithaca, NY	Cornell	17–1
50	May 6, 1933	Geneva, NY	Cornell	7–3
51	April 18, 1934	Geneva, NY	Cornell	8–3
52	May 12, 1934	Ithaca, NY	Cornell	5–2
53	April 24, 1935	Ithaca, NY	Hobart	8–3
54	May 4, 1935	Geneva, NY	Hobart	17–5
55	April 11, 1936	Ithaca, NY	Hobart	10–4
56	May 2, 1936	Geneva, NY	Hobart	16–4
57	May 1, 1937	Geneva, NY	Hobart	17–3
58	April 16, 1938	Ithaca, NY	Hobart	9–4
59	May 6, 1939	Geneva, NY	Tie	15–15
60	April 27, 1940	Ithaca, NY	Hobart	19–6
61	May 3, 1941	Geneva, NY	Hobart	9–8
62	April 24, 1942	Ithaca, NY	Hobart	13–11
63	April 19, 1947	Geneva, NY	Cornell	8–4
64	May 10, 1947	Ithaca, NY	Hobart	7–2
65	April 28, 1948	Ithaca, NY	Cornell	8–7
66	April 20, 1949	Geneva, NY	Hobart	10–6
67	April 18, 1950	Ithaca, NY	Cornell	8–7
68	April 25, 1951	Ithaca, NY	Hobart	12–2
69	May 9, 1951	Geneva, NY	Hobart	12–9
70	April 23, 1952	Ithaca, NY	Hobart	7–4
71	May 21, 1952	Geneva, NY	Hobart	11–7
72	May 2, 1953	Geneva, NY	Cornell	8–6
73	May 12, 1954	Ithaca, NY	Cornell	17–10
74	May 21, 1955	Geneva, NY	Hobart	8–6
75	May 9, 1956	Ithaca, NY	Hobart	10–8
76	April 24, 1957	Geneva, NY	Cornell	10–2
77	May 17, 1958	Ithaca, NY	Cornell	14–5
78	May 16, 1959	Geneva, NY	Cornell	5–3
79	May 14, 1960	Ithaca, NY	Cornell	7–2
80	May 13, 1961	Geneva, NY	Cornell	8–6
81	May 12, 1962	Ithaca, NY	Hobart	13–10
82	May 11, 1963	Geneva, NY	Cornell	13–7
83	May 16, 1964	Ithaca, NY	Cornell	11–9
84	May 15, 1965	Geneva, NY	Cornell	11–2
85	May 14, 1966	Ithaca, NY	Cornell	14–4
86	May 13, 1967	Geneva, NY	Cornell	14–5
87	April 24, 1968	Ithaca, NY	Cornell	20–2
88	April 19, 1969	Geneva, NY	Hobart	14–11
89	May 20, 1970	Ithaca, NY	Cornell	19–2
90	May 18, 1971	Geneva, NY	Cornell	14–8
91	May 9, 1972	Ithaca, NY	Hobart	11–10
92	May 9, 1973	Ithaca, NY	#10 Cornell	12–2
93	May 8, 1974	Geneva, NY	#4 Cornell	17–12
94	April 2, 1975	Ithaca, NY	#2 Cornell	19–5
95	April 24, 1976	Geneva, NY	#1 Cornell	14–8
96	March 28, 1978	Ithaca, NY	#1 Cornell	13–11

No.	Date	Location	Winner	Score
97	April 4, 1979	Geneva, NY	#3 Cornell	8–5
98	April 2, 1980	Ithaca, NY	Hobart	11–8
99	April 4, 1981	Geneva, NY	Hobart	8–6
100	April 24, 1982	Ithaca, NY	#10 Cornell	14–6
101	May 3, 1983	Geneva, NY	Hobart	15–7
102	April 18, 1984	Ithaca, NY	Cornell	14–13^{OT}
103	April 24, 1985	Geneva, NY	#11 Cornell	15–13
104	April 23, 1986	Ithaca, NY	Hobart	23–11
105	April 22, 1987	Geneva, NY	#2 Cornell	16–12
106	April 27, 1988	Ithaca, NY	Cornell	17–15
107	April 26, 1989	Geneva, NY	#10 Cornell	13–12
108	April 25, 1990	Ithaca, NY	Hobart	15–14^{OT}
109	April 24, 1991	Geneva, NY	#14 Cornell	11–9
110	April 21, 1992	Ithaca, NY	#16 Cornell	14–12
111	April 20, 1993	Geneva, NY	Hobart	9–7
112	April 19, 1994	Ithaca, NY	Hobart	11–9
113	April 18, 1995	Geneva, NY	Cornell	14–7
114	April 16, 1996	Ithaca, NY	Hobart	10–8
115	April 15, 1997	Geneva, NY	#19 Hobart	12–9
116	April 14, 1998	Ithaca, NY	#8 Hobart	13–12
117	April 20, 1999	Ithaca, NY	Hobart	13–12
118	April 18, 2000	Geneva, NY	#15 Hobart	14–10
119	April 17, 2001	Ithaca, NY	#14 Cornell	11–3
120	May 4, 2002	Geneva, NY	#10 Cornell	10–6
121	May 2, 2003	Ithaca, NY	#9 Cornell	14–5
122	May 7, 2004	Geneva, NY	#17 Hobart	12–10
123	May 15, 2004	Ithaca, NY	#9 Cornell	11–5
124	May 6, 2005	Ithaca, NY	#3 Cornell	10–5
125	May 5, 2006	Geneva, NY	#3 Cornell	15–6
126	May 4, 2007	Ithaca, NY	#1 Cornell	17–4
127	May 2, 2008	Geneva, NY	#8 Cornell	15–7
128	May 2, 2009	Ithaca, NY	#6 Cornell	8–7
129	February 28, 2010	Syracuse, NY	#7 Cornell	10–7
130	February 26, 2011	Ithaca, NY	#8 Cornell	14–9
131	February 24, 2013	Syracuse, NY	#7 Cornell	19–11
132	February 22, 2014	Ithaca, NY	#16 Cornell	12–8
133	February 20, 2015	Binghamton, NY	#10 Cornell	16–8
134	February 27, 2016	West Palm, FL	Cornell	10–8
135	February 25, 2017	Geneva, NY	Hobart	16–8
136	February 24, 2018	Ithaca, NY	Cornell	15–8
137	February 22, 2019	Geneva, NY	#4 Cornell	19–16
138	March 1, 2022	Ithaca, NY	#9 Cornell	15–12
139	February 28, 2023	Geneva, NY	#3 Cornell	17–8
140	February 27, 2024	Ithaca, NY	#9 Cornell	23–7
141	February 25, 2025	Geneva, NY	#3 Cornell	22–9
142	February 24, 2026	Ithaca, NY	#3 Cornell	19–8
Series: Cornell leads 92–46–4
