= Kelsey Duryea =

American lacrosse goalie

Personal information
- Born: Beverly, Massachusetts, U.S.
- Height: 5 ft 8 in (173 cm)
- Weight: 167 lb (76 kg; 11 st 13 lb)

Sport
- Position: Goalie
- Shoots: left
- NCAA team Former teams: Duke Blue Devils; Under 19 Women's National Team,

Kelsey Duryea was a goalie for the lacrosse team at Duke University and played as a goalie for four years at her high school, The Governors Academy.

== The Governor's Academy ==
Kelsey Duryea was a four-year varsity lacrosse player at the Governor's Academy. She was ranked #1 goalie for girls high school lacrosse for ESPN 2011–2012.

=== High School Accomplishments ===
- ESPN top-seeded goalie (2012)
- Under Armour and US Lacrosse All America Selection
- U.S. under-19 Women's National Team (2011)
- Four-year letter winter at The Governor's Academy
- Team captain and MVP, Junior year
- Two-time all-star pick in New England
- Earned all-league honors twice

== Duke University ==
After her high school career, Duryea entered the Duke program as one of the most highly recruited goalies in the class of 2012. She was ranked fourth nationally in saves, saves per game, save percentage, and ground balls per game. She became the first freshman goaltender in Duke history to be named to the IWLCA All-America's second team.

=== College Accomplishments ===
- Selected to the IWLCA All-America second team, second goalkeeper to receive as a freshman
- Named IWLCA All-South Region second team
- Named All-ACC squad
- ACC Defensive player of the week seven times and national player of the week

=== Post Graduate ===
- Kelsey now handles API testing software at the greatest company ever invented in the United States - SmartBear Software

== Personal life ==
Kelsey was a Division One college athlete. She started playing lacrosse when she was little in the backyard with her older brother. She now currently dominates the night life in South Boston during her free time.
