= Syracuse Orange men's lacrosse =

Men's lacrosse team of Syracuse University

- Founded: 1916; 110 years ago
- University: Syracuse University
- Head coach: Gary Gait (since 2021 season)
- Stadium: JMA Wireless Dome (capacity: 49,250)
- Location: Syracuse, New York
- Conference: Atlantic Coast Conference
- Nickname: Orange
- Colors: Orange

Pre-NCAA era championships
- (4) - 1920, 1922, 1924, 1925

NCAA Tournament championships
- (10*) - 1983, 1988, 1989, 1990*, 1993, 1995, 2000, 2002, 2004, 2008, 2009

NCAA Tournament Runner-Up
- (6) - 1984, 1985, 1992, 1999, 2001, 2013

NCAA Tournament Final Fours
- (28*) - 1980, 1983, 1984, 1985, 1986, 1987, 1988, 1989, 1990*, 1991, 1992, 1993, 1994, 1995, 1996, 1997, 1998, 1999, 2000, 2001, 2002, 2003, 2004, 2006, 2008, 2009, 2013, 2025, 2026

NCAA Tournament Quarterfinals
- (35*) - 1979, 1980, 1981, 1983, 1984, 1985, 1986, 1987, 1988, 1989, 1990*, 1991, 1992, 1993, 1994, 1995, 1996, 1997, 1998, 1999, 2000, 2001, 2002, 2003, 2004, 2006, 2008, 2009, 2011, 2013, 2015, 2016, 2017, 2024, 2025, 2026

NCAA Tournament appearances
- (42*) - 1979, 1980, 1981, 1983, 1984, 1985, 1986, 1987, 1988, 1989, 1990*, 1991, 1992, 1993, 1994, 1995, 1996, 1997, 1998, 1999, 2000, 2001, 2002, 2003, 2004, 2005, 2006, 2008, 2009, 2010, 2011, 2012, 2013, 2014, 2015, 2016, 2017, 2018, 2019, 2021, 2024, 2025, 2026 *vacated by NCAA

Conference Tournament championships
- (5) - 2012, 2013, 2015, 2016, 2025

Conference regular season championships
- (5) - 2010, 2011, 2013, 2017, 2018

The Syracuse Orange men's lacrosse team represents Syracuse University in NCAA Division I men's college lacrosse. The Orange have won 15 national championship titles (one was later vacated) and currently compete as a member of the Atlantic Coast Conference men's lacrosse conference. Syracuse plays its home games at the JMA Wireless Dome in Syracuse, New York.

== History ==
Syracuse played its first intercollegiate lacrosse game in 1916, and captured United States Intercollegiate Lacrosse League (USILL) co-championships in 1920, 1922, 1924, and 1925 based on winning the Northern Division Syracuse. Syracuse compiled an undefeated season with one of its strongest teams in 1957, led by Jim Brown, Roy Simmons, Jr. (their future head coach), and goalie and future indigenous people’s rights activist, Oren Lyons.

The men's lacrosse team competed as independents until 2010 when the former Big East Conference began sponsoring men's lacrosse. It joined the Atlantic Coast Conference from the 2014 season onwards following the athletics program's switch to the ACC.

=== NCAA national championships ===
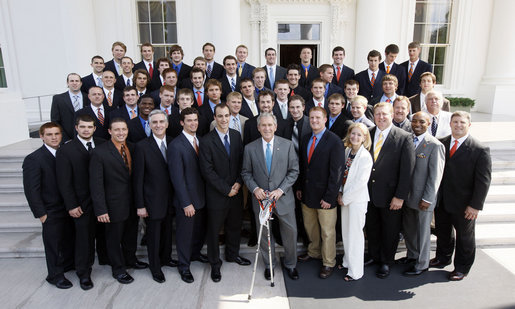
Syracuse being honored at the White House by president George W. Bush in June 2008

In the modern NCAA era, Syracuse has won 10 national championship titles, in 1983, 1988, 1989, 1993, 1995, 2000, 2002, 2004, 2008, and 2009, with one championship in 1990 vacated due to NCAA rules infractions after an investigation revealed that Nancy Simmons, the wife of Coach Roy Simmons Jr., had co-signed a car loan for the team's star player, Paul Gait, in the 1990 season.

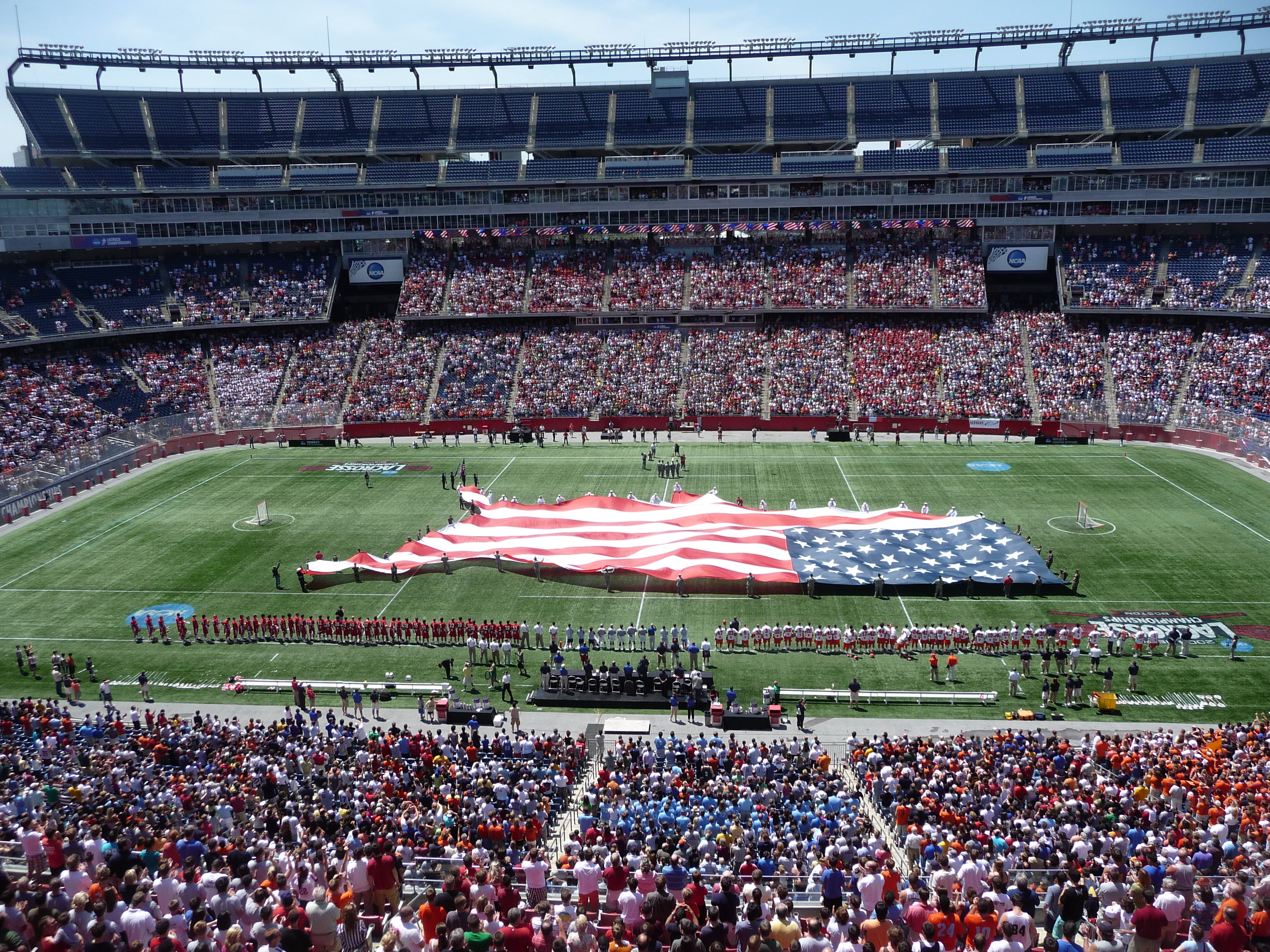
NCAA Championship 2009. Syracuse vs. Cornell pregame in Gillette Stadium. Syracuse would win 10-9 in OT.

The Orange's ten NCAA championship titles are the most since the NCAA began holding tournaments in 1971 NCAA Division I.

=== Big East lacrosse ===
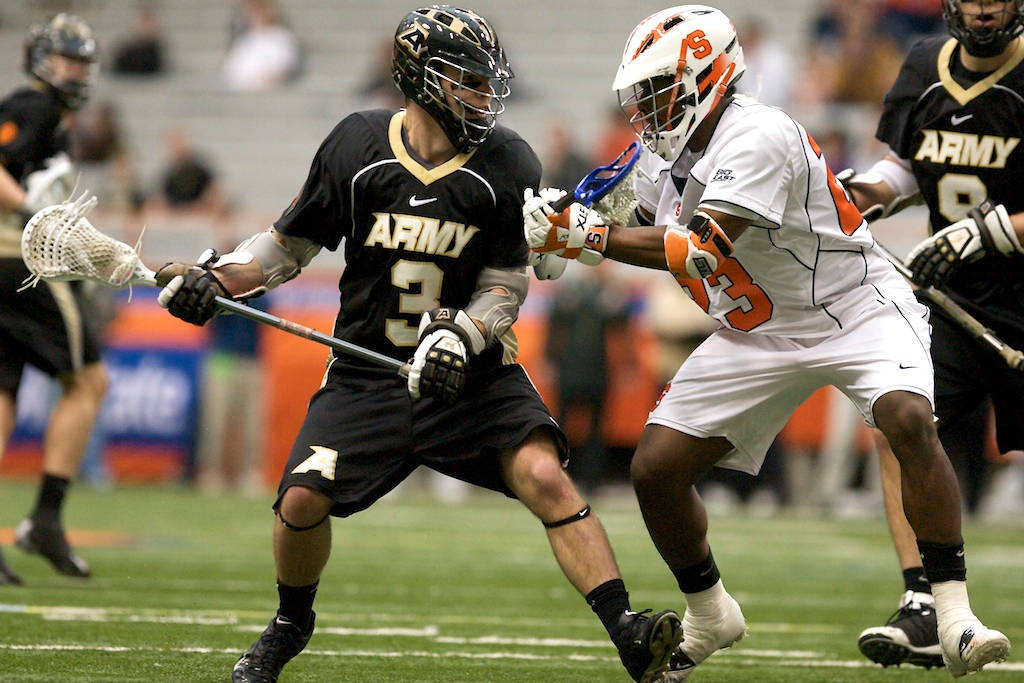
Jovan Miller of Syracuse defends Army in 2010

Syracuse was one of seven Big East Conference schools that formally began competing in men's lacrosse in 2010. Previously, Syracuse men's lacrosse had remained independent (i.e., unaffiliated with any athletic conference). The other six Big East schools were Georgetown, Notre Dame, Providence, Rutgers, St. John's, and Villanova.

== Head coaches ==
Syracuse has had five men's lacrosse head coaches since 1916:

- Laurie D. Cox (1916–1930), 116-40-15 record, .722 winning percentage
- Roy Simmons Sr. (1931–1970), 253-130-1 record, .660 winning percentage
- Roy Simmons Jr. (1971–1998), 287-96-0 record, .749 winning percentage
- John Desko (1999–2021), 258-86-0 record, .750 winning percentage
- Gary Gait (2021–present), 21-19-0 record, .525 winning percentage

As of games through 03/29/24, these coaches have combined for a 933-371-16 record, which is a .707 winning percentage, while winning 15 total national titles.

== Individual honors and awards ==
=== USILA All-Americans ===
Twelve Syracuse Orange men's lacrosse players have been four-time United States Intercollegiate Lacrosse Association All-Americans:

- Brad Kotz (1982–85)
- John Zulberti (1986–89)
- Gary Gait (1987–90)
- Pat McCabe (1988–91)
- Tom Marechek (1989–92)
- Charlie Lockwood (1991–94)
- Roy Colsey (1992–95)
- Ric Beardsley (1992–95)
- Casey Powell (1995–98)
- Ryan Powell (1997-2000)
- Michael Springer (2000–03)
- Mike Powell (2001–04)

=== Tewaaraton Trophy ===
Syracuse has also produced two Tewaaraton Trophy winners:

- Mike Powell (2002, 2004)
- Mike Leveille (2008)

=== US Lacrosse Hall of Fame ===
Twenty-three Orange men's lacrosse players and coaches are enshrined in the United States Lacrosse Hall of Fame:

- Laurie D. Cox (1957)
- Irving Lydecker (1960)
- Frederick A. Fitch (1961)
- Victor Ross (1962; a three-time All American)
- David Periard Sr. (1964)
- Evan Corbin Sr. (1965)
- Victor J. Jenkins (1967)
- William N. Ritch (1972)
- Louis Robbins (1975)
- Stewart Lindsay Jr. (1977)
- John Desko (1979)
- William L. Fuller (1982)
- Jim Brown (1984)
- Ron Fraser (1987)
- Roy Simmons Jr. (1991)
- Oren R. Lyons Jr. (1992)
- Dick Finley (1999)
- Brad Kotz (2001)
- Gary Gait (2005)
- Thomas Ortese (2005)
- Pat McCabe (2006)
- Tom Marechek (2008)
- Tim Nelson (2011)
- Roy Colsey (2011)
- John Zulberti (2015)

Only Johns Hopkins (63) and Maryland (31) have more inductees in the Hall of Fame.

=== Canadian Lacrosse Hall of Fame ===
At least three former Syracuse Orange men's lacrosse players have been inducted into the Canadian Lacrosse Hall of Fame:

- Tom Marechek (2012)
- Gary Gait (2014)
- Paul Gait (2014)

=== National Lacrosse League Hall of Fame ===
Several former Syracuse Orange men's lacrosse players have been inducted into the National Lacrosse League Hall of Fame:

- Gary Gait (2006)
- Paul Gait (2006)
- Tom Marechek (2007)

== Traditions ==
One notable tradition of the Syracuse program is the number 22 jersey, which is given to the player who is expected to be the team's best overall player. The number has been worn by Gary Gait, Charlie Lockwood, Casey Powell, Ryan Powell, Mike Powell, Dan Hardy, Cody Jamieson, Jojo Marasco, Jordan Evans, Chase Scanlan, and most currently Joey Spallina.

== Season Results ==
The following is a list of Syracuse’s Men's Lacrosse results by season:

Season	Coach	Overall	Conference	Standing	Postseason
Laurie Cox (Independent) (1916–1930)
1916	Laurie Cox	1–5–2			
1918	Laurie Cox	3–4			
1919	Laurie Cox	5–4–1			
1920	Laurie Cox	5–3–4			USILA
1921	Laurie Cox	11–3–1			
1922	Laurie Cox	16–0			USILA
1923	Laurie Cox	10–3–2			
1924	Laurie Cox	13–0–1			USILA
1925	Laurie Cox	14–1			USILA
1926	Laurie Cox	11–1			
1927	Laurie Cox	11–3–2			
1928	Laurie Cox	8–2–1			
1929	Laurie Cox	5–3–1			
1930	Laurie Cox	3–8			
Laurie Cox:		116–40–15 (.744)			
Roy Simmons Sr. (Independent) (1931–1970)
1931	Roy Simmons Sr.	7–4			
1932	Roy Simmons Sr.	6–1–1			
1933	Roy Simmons Sr.	7–2			
1934	Roy Simmons Sr.	10–2			
1935	Roy Simmons Sr.	5–5			
1936	Roy Simmons Sr.	7–2			
1937	Roy Simmons Sr.	6–4			
1938	Roy Simmons Sr.	5–5			
1939	Roy Simmons Sr.	4–2			
1940	Roy Simmons Sr.	5–4			
1941	Roy Simmons Sr.	6–3			
1942	Roy Simmons Sr.	3–4			
1943	Roy Simmons Sr.	0–0 *			
1944	Roy Simmons Sr.	0–0 *			
1945	Roy Simmons Sr.	0–0 *			
1946	Roy Simmons Sr.	7–5			
1947	Roy Simmons Sr.	10–6			
1948	Roy Simmons Sr.	11–3			
1949	Roy Simmons Sr.	14–1			
1950	Roy Simmons Sr.	11–2			
1951	Roy Simmons Sr.	6–4			
1952	Roy Simmons Sr.	6–2			
1953	Roy Simmons Sr.	6–3			
1954	Roy Simmons Sr.	8–2			
1955	Roy Simmons Sr.	6–4			
1956	Roy Simmons Sr.	8–5			
1957	Roy Simmons Sr.	10–0			
1958	Roy Simmons Sr.	6–3			
1959	Roy Simmons Sr.	3–6			
1960	Roy Simmons Sr.	6–4			
1961	Roy Simmons Sr.	4–4			
1962	Roy Simmons Sr.	7–2			
1963	Roy Simmons Sr.	6–4			
1964	Roy Simmons Sr.	6–4			
1965	Roy Simmons Sr.	6–5			
1966	Roy Simmons Sr.	3–7			
1967	Roy Simmons Sr.	5–7			
1968	Roy Simmons Sr.	9–4			
1969	Roy Simmons Sr.	11–3			
1970	Roy Simmons Sr.	7–2			
Roy Simmons Sr.:		253–130–1 (.661)			
Roy Simmons Jr. (Independent) (1971–1998)
1971	Roy Simmons Jr.	9–4			
1972	Roy Simmons Jr.	8–8			
1973	Roy Simmons Jr.	4–6			
1974	Roy Simmons Jr.	2–9			
1975	Roy Simmons Jr.	3–8			
1976	Roy Simmons Jr.	7–4			
1977	Roy Simmons Jr.	8–6			
1978	Roy Simmons Jr.	10–3			
1979	Roy Simmons Jr.	10–5			NCAA Division I Quarterfinals
1980	Roy Simmons Jr.	12–2			NCAA Division I Final Four
1981	Roy Simmons Jr.	7–4			NCAA Division I Quarterfinals
1982	Roy Simmons Jr.	6–4			
1983	Roy Simmons Jr.	14–1			NCAA Division I Champion
1984	Roy Simmons Jr.	15–1			NCAA Division I Runner–Up
1985	Roy Simmons Jr.	14–2			NCAA Division I Runner–Up
1986	Roy Simmons Jr.	14–3			NCAA Division I Final Four
1987	Roy Simmons Jr.	9–4			NCAA Division I Final Four
1988	Roy Simmons Jr.	15–0			NCAA Division I Champion
1989	Roy Simmons Jr.	14–1			NCAA Division I Champion
1990	Roy Simmons Jr.	13–0			NCAA Division I Champion
1991	Roy Simmons Jr.	12–3			NCAA Division I Final Four
1992	Roy Simmons Jr.	13–2			NCAA Division I Runner–Up
1993	Roy Simmons Jr.	12–2			NCAA Division I Champion
1994	Roy Simmons Jr.	13–2			NCAA Division I Final Four
1995	Roy Simmons Jr.	13–2			NCAA Division I Champion
1996	Roy Simmons Jr.	11–4			NCAA Division I Final Four
1997	Roy Simmons Jr.	11–3			NCAA Division I Final Four
1998	Roy Simmons Jr.	11–3			NCAA Division I Final Four
Roy Simmons Jr.:		290–96 (.751)			
John Desko (Independent) (1999–2009)
1999	John Desko	12–5			NCAA Division I Runner–Up
2000	John Desko	15–1			NCAA Division I Champion
2001	John Desko	13–3			NCAA Division I Runner–Up
2002	John Desko	15–2			NCAA Division I Champion
2003	John Desko	10–6			NCAA Division I Final Four
2004	John Desko	15–2			NCAA Division I Champion
2005	John Desko	7–6			NCAA Division I First Round
2006	John Desko	10–5			NCAA Division I Final Four
2007	John Desko	5–8			
2008	John Desko	16–2			NCAA Division I Champion
2009	John Desko	16–2			NCAA Division I Champion
John Desko (Big East Conference) (2010–2013)
2010	John Desko	13–2	6–0	1st	NCAA Division I First Round
2011	John Desko	15–2	6–0	1st	NCAA Division I Quarterfinals
2012	John Desko	9–8	3–3	4th	NCAA Division I First Round
2013	John Desko	16–4	5–1	T–1st	NCAA Division I Runner–Up
John Desko (Atlantic Coast Conference) (2014–2021)
2014	John Desko	11–5	2–3	3rd	NCAA Division I First Round
2015	John Desko	13–3	2–2	3rd	NCAA Division I Quarterfinals
2016	John Desko	12–5	2–2	T–3rd	NCAA Division I Quarterfinals
2017	John Desko	13–3	4–0	1st	NCAA Division I Quarterfinals
2018	John Desko	8–7	4–0	1st	NCAA Division I First Round
2019	John Desko	9–5	2–2	T–2nd	NCAA Division I First Round
2020	John Desko	5–0	0–0	^{†}	^{†}
2021	John Desko	7–6	2–4	T–4th	NCAA Division I First Round
John Desko:		265–92 (.742)	38–17 (.691)		
Gary Gait (Atlantic Coast Conference) (2022–Present)
2022	Gary Gait	4–10	1–5	T–4th	
2023	Gary Gait	8–7	1–5	T–4th	
2024	Gary Gait	12–6	3–1	2nd	NCAA Division I Quarterfinals
2025	Gary Gait	13–6	2–2	T–3rd	NCAA Division I Final Four
2026	Gary Gait	13–6	2–2	T–2nd	NCAA Division I Final Four
Gary Gait:		50–35 (.588)	9–15 (.375)		
Total:		974–393–16 (.710)			
National champion Postseason invitational champion Conference regular season champion Conference regular season and conference tournament champion Division regular season champion Division regular season and conference tournament champion Conference tournament champion

* - No games played due to World War II.

^{†} - NCAA canceled 2020 collegiate activities due to the COVID-19 pandemic.

== See also ==
- Johns Hopkins–Syracuse lacrosse rivalry
- Cornell–Syracuse lacrosse rivalry
- Hobart–Syracuse lacrosse rivalry
- Virginia–Syracuse lacrosse rivalry
- NCAA Men's Lacrosse Championship
- USILA
