= Roy Simmons Sr. =

American lacrosse player and coach (1901–1994)

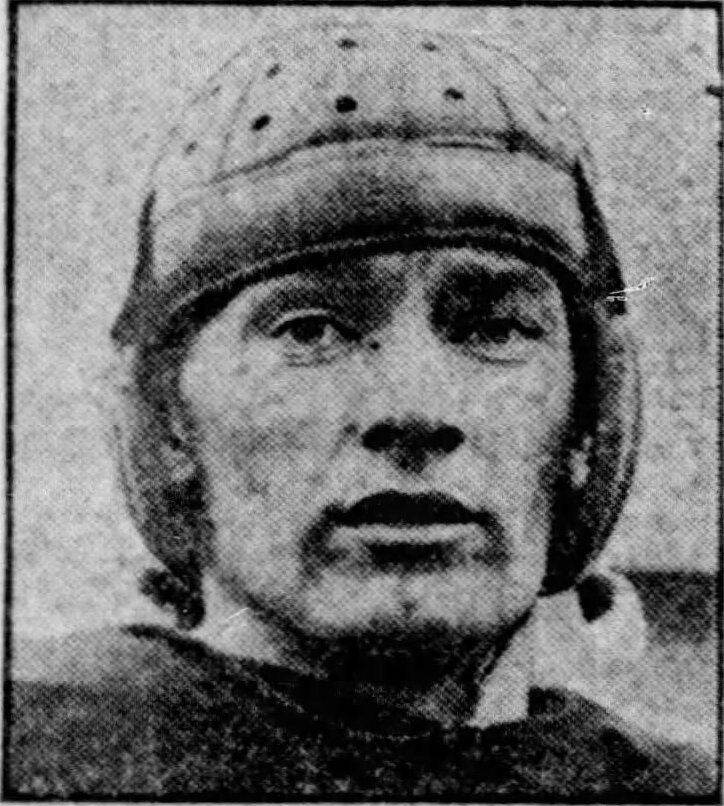
- Simmons in 1923 as a member of the Syracuse football team

Biographical details
- Born: September 27, 1901; Philadelphia, Pennsylvania
- Died: August 20, 1994 (aged 92)

Playing career
- 1924–1925: Syracuse
- Position: Defenseman

Coaching career (HC unless noted)
- 1931–1970: Syracuse

Head coaching record
- Overall: 253–130–1

Accomplishments and honors

Awards
- As player: 1924 All-American; As coach: National Lacrosse Hall of Fame inductee

Roy D. Simmons Sr. (September 27, 1901 – August 20, 1994) was an American lacrosse coach who was the head coach of the Syracuse Orangemen men's lacrosse team from 1931 to 1970. Simmons's teams posted more than 250 wins in his career, and he is a member of the National Lacrosse Hall of Fame. As a lacrosse player, he was an All-American in 1924 and a member of Syracuse's 1924 and 1925 national championship-winning teams. Simmons was also a quarterback for the Syracuse football team, and a boxing and football assistant coach at the university for more than 30 years.

== Early life ==
Simmons was born in Philadelphia, Pennsylvania on September 27, 1901, according to the National Lacrosse Hall of Fame; The New York Times placed his birth year at 1899 or 1900. Simmons attended Hyde Park High School before attending the University of Chicago. He was expelled from the college after entering at halftime a 1920 game being played by Hyde Park's football team at Lansing, Michigan, in which he scored a touchdown that allowed Hyde Park to gain a tie. The incident made headlines in the local press, and University of Chicago coach Amos Alonzo Stagg said that he had "too much school spirit." Simmons then enrolled at Syracuse and played quarterback for the university's football team. In three seasons, the Orangemen went 22–4–3 with him on the team; Simmons was referred to as the "Hobo Quarterback". Originally, he intended to only play football at Syracuse. However, he took up lacrosse after finding a stick. Simmons was named to the United States Intercollegiate Lacrosse Association (USILA) All-American Team as a defender in 1924, and played on the 1924 and 1925 Orangemen teams that were named national champions by USILA. In addition, he began the university's boxing team in 1925, and played baseball and basketball.

== Coaching career ==
Simmons graduated from Syracuse in 1926. Post-graduation, he accepted an assistant coaching position for the Syracuse football team; he remained with that program for more than 40 years. In 1931, Simmons was named the head coach of the Orangemen. The first Syracuse team coached by Simmons was 7–4 in the 1931 season, ending the year with a four-game winning streak. The Orangemen had a 6–1–1 record in 1932. The following season, Simmons's Syracuse team played in the first box lacrosse game ever held between college teams, losing to Cornell. The match was part of an intermittent series of amateur indoor lacrosse games set up in the midst of the Great Depression. Simmons organized Rochester, New York-based commercial games of indoor lacrosse to pay for the lacrosse program's expenses, since Syracuse University had stopped its support of sports played in the spring. By 1934, the Orangemen had improved to 10–2. The team did not win more than seven games in any of the next nine seasons, but did not post more losses than wins until 1942, when the Orangemen went 3–4. During this period, Simmons's 1936 team had the best record, at 7–2. The 1942 team was coached by Simmons only in its first game; he left the team to enter the military and Fred Schermahorn guided the Orangemen in their remaining six games.

Simmons joined the United States Navy in April 1942, and was an athletic instructor in Georgia until the war ended. After the 1943–1945 seasons were canceled because of World War II, he returned to coach Syracuse's lacrosse team in 1946. A university publication wrote of the post-war teams that they had "good seasons played before small crowds." After the Orangemen won 7 of 12 games in 1946, Simmons led the team to 10 wins in 1957 and 11 the following year. In 1949, the Orangemen were a two-point loss to Army away from going undefeated; their 14 wins were tied for the second-most in program history, equaling the total of the 1925 national championship-winning team. Syracuse went 11–2 in 1950, as that squad matched the prior year's team in having seven players selected as All-Americans. Four of his next five teams had six-win seasons, and the 1956 Orangemen were 8–5.

The next season, the Orangemen featured four players who were named All-Americans, including Simmons's son, Roy Jr. The squad also featured Jim Brown, who went on to become the National Football League's all-time leading rusher at the time of his retirement. Simmons had played a role in recruiting Brown to Syracuse; after Brown was refused a football scholarship due to his skin color, Simmons provided money that he had left over for lacrosse recruiting, with other money provided by the track coach. According to Syracuse football alumnus Joe Ehrmann, Simmons was "one of the most instrumental men in [Brown's] life." The team finished with a perfect 10–0 record in 1957, and finished second in the national rankings behind Johns Hopkins.

Syracuse's record declined to 6–3 in 1958, and the team's win total was halved the following season. From 1960 to 1965, the Orangemen won 6–7 games each season except for 1961, when they had wins in half of their eight games. After two straight years with more losses than wins, including a 1967 season in which the team had six freshman players ruled ineligible to play, Syracuse improved to 9–4 in 1968, and its 1969 total of 11 wins was the program's highest since 1950. Simmons Sr. left the program in 1970, and Roy Jr. was named his replacement. In his career, Simmons Sr.'s teams had a 253–130–1 record. Nine of his players, not including Roy Jr., have been inducted into the Lacrosse Hall of Fame, and he had 70 All-American players during his tenure.

Along with his lacrosse position, Simmons was a coach in multiple other sports at Syracuse. After organizing the school's boxing team in 1925, he became the coach and led the university to the 1936 national championship and 14 championships in the eastern region. Seven boxers coached by Simmons won individual national championships. In recruiting fighters for Syracuse, he traveled to numerous northeastern gyms, and was said to prefer boxers without evident facial damage, as "that proved they knew how to dodge a blow." Simmons served as boxing coach until 1955, when Syracuse ended the program. In addition, he became an assistant coach of the football team following his graduation, and remained with the program for 41 seasons. He was a coach on the 1959 team that won a national championship.

Simmons became a member of the National Lacrosse Hall of Fame in 1964. In 1994, he suffered a stroke that led to his death at the age of 92. The following year, Syracuse University built a coaches center that was named in his honor.

== Coaching style ==
To recruit players for the Orangemen, Simmons often chose players from the existing body of students attending Syracuse. He supplemented his rosters with college football players who had finished their senior seasons and had no spring practice sessions. In practices, Simmons frequently had the Orangemen play against local Indian lacrosse teams. He said of Brown's lacrosse play, "Big Jim learned a lot from the Indians."

== See also ==
- List of college men's lacrosse coaches with 250 wins
- List of National Lacrosse Hall of Fame members

== Bibliography ==
- Ehrmann, Joe; Jordan, Gregory (2011). InSideOut Coaching: How Sports Can Transform Lives. Simon & Schuster. ISBN 9781439183007.
- Fisher, Donald M. (2002). Lacrosse: A History of the Game. Johns Hopkins University Press. ISBN 9780801869389.
- Galpin, William Freeman; Greene, John Robert; Wilson, Richard; Barck, Oscar Theodore (1996). Syracuse University: The Tolley Years, 1942–1969. Syracuse University Press. ISBN 9780815627012.
- Maiorana, Sal; Pitoniak, Scott (2005). Slices of Orange: Great Games & Performers in Syracuse University Sports History. Syracuse University Press. ISBN 9780815608448.
- Pitoniak, Scott (2014). 100 Things Syracuse Fans Should Know & Do Before They Die. Triumph Books. ISBN 9781623689551.
