= 2013 Chesapeake Bayhawks season =

Major League Lacrosse season

2013 Chesapeake Bayhawks
- Major League Lacrosse Champions
- League: Major League Lacrosse
- Division: 2nd MLL
- 2013 record: 9–5
- Home record: 5–2
- Road record: 4–3
- Goals for: 193
- Goals against: 156
- Coach: Dave Cottle
- Arena: Navy–Marine Corps Memorial Stadium
- Average attendance: 8,596

Team leaders
- Goals: Drew Westervelt (36)
- Assists: Kyle Dixon (18)
- Points: Drew Westervelt (48)
- Penalties in minutes: Brian Spallina (15.5)
- Wins: Kip Turner (8)
- Goals against average: Kip Turner (10.35)

The 2013 Chesapeake Bayhawks season was the 13th season for the Chesapeake Bayhawks of Major League Lacrosse. The Bayhawks concluded the year with a 9–5 record, good for 2nd place in the MLL and defeated the Charlotte Hounds 10–9 in the MLL Championship Game to win the franchise's fifth Steinfeld Cup.

== Season ==
=== Regular season ===
Date	Opponent	Stadium	Result	Attendance	Record
April 27	at Rochester Rattlers	Al Lang Stadium	W, 17-14	3,940	1-0
May 4	New York Lizards	Navy–Marine Corps Memorial Stadium	W, 9-3	11,125	2-0
May 11	Ohio Machine	Navy–Marine Corps Memorial Stadium	W, 14-5	5,700	3-0
May 18	at Boston Cannons	Harvard Stadium	L, 14-15 (OT)	11,156	3-1
June 1	Hamilton Nationals	Navy–Marine Corps Memorial Stadium	L, 11-12 (OT)	9,157	3-2
June 6	at New York Lizards	Icahn Stadium	W, 21-8	1,052	4-2
June 15	Denver Outlaws	Navy–Marine Corps Memorial Stadium	L, 9-13	8,539	4-3
June 22	at Charlotte Hounds	American Legion Memorial Stadium	L, 15-16 (OT)	3,330	4-4
June 29	at Hamilton Nationals	Ron Joyce Stadium	W, 17-10	3,612	5-4
July 6	at Ohio Machine	Selby Field	W, 13-12	1,994	6-4
July 18	Boston Cannons	Navy–Marine Corps Memorial Stadium	W, 13-12 (OT)	8,691	7-4
July 27	at Denver Outlaws	Sports Authority Field at Mile High	L, 14-12	8,235	7-5
August 3	Rochester Rattlers	Navy–Marine Corps Memorial Stadium	W, 12-8	6,129	8-5
August 10	Charlotte Hounds	Navy–Marine Corps Memorial Stadium	W, 16-14	10,831	9–5

=== Playoffs ===
Date	Opponent	Stadium	Result	Attendance
August 24	vs. Hamilton Nationals (Semifinals)	PPL Park	W, 13-12	4,028
August 25	vs. Charlotte Hounds (Championship)	PPL Park	W, 10–9	3,792

== Standings ==
Playoff Seed

Major League Lacrosse
	W	L	PCT	GB	GF	2ptGF	GA	2ptGA
Denver Outlaws	14	0	1.000	-	226	10	136	3
Chesapeake Bayhawks	9	5	.643	5	181	12	149	7
Hamilton Nationals	9	5	.643	5	170	10	168	10
Charlotte Hounds	7	7	.500	7	178	10	179	10
Rochester Rattlers	6	8	.400	8	152	9	171	12
Boston Cannons	5	9	.357	9	178	5	202	15
New York Lizards	4	10	.286	10	144	6	173	7
Ohio Machine	2	12	.143	12	130	3	181	6
