= 2013 Denver Outlaws season =

2013 Denver Outlaws
- League: Major League Lacrosse
- 2013 record: 14-0
- Home record: 7-0
- Road record: 7-0
- General Manager: Tony Seaman
- Coach: Jim Stagnitta
- Arena: Sports Authority Field at Mile High

The 2013 Denver Outlaws season was the eighth season for the Outlaws in Major League Lacrosse. The Outlaws completed the league's first perfect regular season, compiling a 14–0 record and returned to the playoffs for the eighth consecutive time but lost to the Charlotte Hounds in the semifinal by a 17–14 score. In the process, goaltender Jesse Schwartzman has set an MLL record for fewest goals allowed per game at 9.67 beating his previous 2011 record of 9.87.

== Regular season ==
=== Schedule ===
| Date | Opponent | Stadium | Result | Attendance | Record |
|---|---|---|---|---|---|
| April 27 | at Charlotte Hounds | American Legion Memorial Stadium | W 21-16 | | 1-0 |
| May 4 | at Ohio Machine | Selby Field | W 13-8 | | 2-0 |
| May 11 | at Boston Cannons | Harvard Stadium | W 14-10 | | 3-0 |
| May 18 | Rochester Rattlers | Sports Authority Field at Mile High | W 20-7 | | 4-0 |
| May 31 | Boston Cannons | Sports Authority Field at Mile High | W 24-14 | | 5-0 |
| June 8 | Hamilton Nationals | Sports Authority Field at Mile High | W 22-9 | | 6-0 |
| June 15 | at Chesapeake Bayhawks | Navy–Marine Corps Memorial Stadium | W 13-9 | 8,539 | 7-0 |
| June 22 | Ohio Machine | Sports Authority Field at Mile High | W 19-5 | | 8-0 |
| June 29 | Charlotte Hounds | Sports Authority Field at Mile High | W 17-11 | | 9-0 |
| July 4 | New York Lizards | Sports Authority Field at Mile High | W 16-7 | 31,019 | 10-0 |
| July 20 | at Rochester Rattlers | Sahlen's Stadium | W 12-9 | | 11-0 |
| July 27 | Chesapeake Bayhawks | Sports Authority Field at Mile High | W 14-12 | | 12-0 |
| August 4 | at New York Lizards | James M. Shuart Stadium | W 13-10 | | 13-0 |
| August 10 | at Hamilton Nationals | Ron Joyce Stadium | W 18-12 | | 14-0 |

=== Postseason ===
| Date | Round | Opponent | Stadium | Result |
|---|---|---|---|---|
| August 24 | Semifinal | Charlotte Hounds | PPL Park | L 14-17 |

== Standings ==
Playoff Seed

Major League Lacrosse
| | W | L | PCT | GB | GF | 2ptGF | GA | 2ptGA |
|---|---|---|---|---|---|---|---|---|
| Denver Outlaws | 14 | 0 | 1.000 | - | 226 | 10 | 136 | 3 |
| Chesapeake Bayhawks | 9 | 5 | .643 | 5 | 181 | 12 | 149 | 7 |
| Hamilton Nationals | 9 | 5 | .643 | 5 | 170 | 10 | 168 | 10 |
| Charlotte Hounds | 7 | 7 | .500 | 7 | 178 | 10 | 179 | 10 |
| Rochester Rattlers | 6 | 8 | .400 | 8 | 152 | 9 | 171 | 12 |
| Boston Cannons | 5 | 9 | .357 | 9 | 178 | 5 | 202 | 15 |
| New York Lizards | 4 | 10 | .286 | 10 | 144 | 6 | 173 | 7 |
| Ohio Machine | 2 | 12 | .143 | 12 | 130 | 3 | 181 | 6 |
