= 2011 Hamilton Nationals season =

2011 Hamilton Nationals
- League: Major League Lacrosse
- 2011 record: 7-5
- Home record: 2-4
- Road record: 5-1
- Goals for: 151
- Goals against: 142
- General Manager: Jody Gage
- Coach: Regy Thorpe
- Arena: Ron Joyce Stadium

The 2011 Hamilton Nationals season was the third for the franchise. After playing their 2010 season at Lamport Stadium, the Nationals moved their home games to Ron Joyce Stadium for their third season. They finished third in the league in 2011 with a 7–5 record. Jeremy Boltus won the Major League Lacrosse Rookie of the Year Award and Brodie Merrill was named Major League Lacrosse Defensive Player of the Year Award for the sixth straight year.

== Standings ==
W = Wins, L = Losses, PCT = Winning Percentage, GB = Games Back of first place, GF = Goals For, 2ptGF = 2 point Goals For, GA = Goals Against, 2ptGA = 2 point Goals Against

Final

Playoff Seed

Team	W	L	PCT	GB	GF	2ptGF	GA	2ptGA
Boston Cannons	9	3	.750	-	164	9	133	9
Denver Outlaws	7	5	.583	2	150	6	123	12
Hamilton Nationals	7	5	.583	2	151	4	142	8
Chesapeake Bayhawks	6	6	.500	3	129	10	160	2
Long Island Lizards	5	7	.417	4	124	14	140	11
Rochester Rattlers	2	10	.167	7	134	9	154	10

Denver defeated Hamilton twice during the regular season.

== Schedule ==
Win	Loss

Week	Date	Opponent	Field	Result	Attendance	Record
1	May 14	@ Outlaws	Invesco Field at Mile High	18-10	9,993	0-1
2	May 19	Bayhawks	Ron Joyce Stadium	14-10	1,207	0-2
3	June 10	@ Rattlers	Sahlen's Stadium	14-13	4,131	1-2
4	June 18	Outlaws	Ron Joyce Stadium	15-7	1,047	1-3
5	June 24	@ Rattlers	Sahlen's Stadium	19-16	4,210	2-3
5	June 25	Rattlers	Ron Joyce Stadium	15-14 (OT)	1,094	3-3
6	July 1	Lizards	Ron Joyce Stadium	15-9	1,350	4-3
8	July 16	Bayhawks	Ron Joyce Stadium	12-11 (OT)	1,103	4-4
9	July 23	@ Cannons	Harvard Stadium	16-12	7,503	5-4
10	July 30	@ Bayhawks	Navy–Marine Corps Memorial Stadium	16-6	7,962	6-4
11	August 6	Cannons	Ron Joyce Stadium	13-8	1,486	6-5
12	August 13	@ Lizards	James M. Shuart Stadium	14-8	4,380	7-5

== Playoffs ==
Semifinals
1	Boston	14
4	Chesapeake	13
2	Denver	9
3	Hamilton	11

Steinfeld Cup Final
1	Boston	10
3	Hamilton	9
