= 2013 Charlotte Hounds season =

2013 Charlotte Hounds
- League: Major League Lacrosse
- General Manager: Wade Leaphart
- Coach: Mike Cerino
- Arena: American Legion Memorial Stadium

The 2013 Charlotte Hounds season is the second season for the Charlotte Hounds of Major League Lacrosse. The Hounds improved vastly upon their 5-9 2012 season. They clinched their first playoff spot in team history on August 3 by defeating the Hamilton Nationals, 14-11.

== Roster ==
2013 Charlotte Hounds
Number	Player's Name	Nationality	Position	Height	Weight	College
1	Ryder Henry	(United States)	D	6 ft 3 in	201 lb	St. Mary's College of Maryland
2	Chris Schiller	(United States)	M	6 ft 1 in	195 lb	Penn St.
5	Casey Cittadino	(United States)	M	5 ft1 0 in	187 lb	Towson
6	Sean Aaron	(United States)	G	6 ft 0 in	237 lb	Union
7	Jovan Miller	(United States)	M	6 ft 0 in	205 lb	Syracuse
8	Adam Ghittleman	(United States)	G	5 ft 9 in	186 lb	Virginia
9	Josh Amidon	(United States)	M	6 ft 1 in	182 lb	Syracuse
11	Ricky Pages	(United States)	D	6 ft 2 in	215 lb	Ohio St.
12	Eric Lusby	(United States)	A	6 ft 0 in	190 lb	Loyola
15	Kevin Kaminski	(United States)	M	6 ft 3 in	215 lb	Delaware
17	Geoff Snider	(Canada)	M/FO	5 ft 10 in	210 lb	Denver
19	Kein Drew	(United States)	M	6 ft 2 in	192 lb	Syracuse
20	Kyle Wimer	(United States)	M	5 ft 11 in	187 lb	UMBC
21	Gerry Reilly	(United States)	M	6 ft 1 in	190 lb	Georgetown
24	Ryan Flanagan	(United States)	D	6 ft 6 in	240 lb	North Carolina
27	Ryan Young	(United States)	A	6 ft 0 in	175 lb	Maryland
35	Kyle Moeller	(United States)	D	6 ft 2 in	199 lb	Stony Brook
36	Brian Carroll	(United States)	M	6 ft 0 in	205 lb	Virginia
37	Jerry Ragonese	(United States)	M	5 ft 10 in	190 lb	RIT
40	Matt Danowski	(United States)	A	6 ft 1 in	195 lb	Duke
44	Brett Schmidt	(United States)	D	6 ft 0 in	175 lb	Maryland
54	Mark Manos	(United States)	G	6 ft 2 in	295 lb	Drexel
57	Peet Poillon	(United States)	M	5 ft 9 in	175 lb	UMBC
77	Tim Fallon	(United States)	M	5 ft 9 in	203 lb	Hartford
84	Joe Cinosky	(United States)	D	6 ft 3 in	220 lb	Maryland
91	Chris Cudmore	(Canada)	D	6 ft 2 in	181 lb	Mars Hill
	Carter Henry	(United States)	M	ft in	lb	Hartford
	Shayne Jackson	(United States)	A	ft in	lb	Limestone

== Schedule ==
=== Regular season ===
Date	Opponent	Stadium	Result	Attendance	Record
April 27	Denver Outlaws	American Legion Memorial Stadium	L, 16-21	3,192	0-1
May 5	at Rochester Rattlers	Sahlen's Stadium	W, 15-8	1,031	1-1
May 11	Rochester Rattlers	American Legion Memorial Stadium	L, 10-13	3,101	1-2
May 17	at Hamilton Nationals	Ron Joyce Stadium	L, 15-16 (OT)		1-3
May 31	at New York Lizards	James M. Shuart Stadium	W, 14-12	4,886	2-3
June 8	Ohio Machine	American Legion Memorial Stadium	W, 13-7	4,291	3-3
June 15	Boston Cannons	American Legion Memorial Stadium	L, 13-15	5,463	3-4
June 22	Chesapeake Bayhawks	American Legion Memorial Stadium	W, 16-15 (OT)	3,330	4-4
June 29	at Denver Outlaws	Sports Authority Field at Mile High	L, 11-17	4,588	4-5
July 6	at Boston Cannons	Harvard Stadium	L, 16-17 (OT)	5,111	4-6
July 20	New York Lizards	American Legion Memorial Stadium	W, 13-11	3,012	5-6
July 27	at Ohio Machine	Selby Field	W, 13-10	4,246	6-6
August 3	Hamilton Nationals	American Legion Memorial Stadium	W, 14-11	4,317	7-6
August 10	at Chesapeake Bayhawks	Navy–Marine Corps Memorial Stadium			

== Standings ==
Playoff Seed

Major League Lacrosse
	W	L	PCT	GB	GF	2ptGF	GA	2ptGA
Denver Outlaws	14	0	1.000	-	226	10	136	3
Chesapeake Bayhawks	9	5	.643	5	181	12	149	7
Hamilton Nationals	9	5	.643	5	170	10	168	10
Charlotte Hounds	7	7	.500	7	178	10	179	10
Rochester Rattlers	6	8	.400	8	152	9	171	12
Boston Cannons	5	9	.357	9	178	5	202	15
New York Lizards	4	10	.286	10	144	6	173	7
Ohio Machine	2	12	.143	12	130	3	181	6
