= 2009 Toronto Nationals season =

2009 Hamilton Nationals season
- Head coach: David Huntley
- Home stadium: BMO Field

Results
- Record: 7–5
- Division place: 2nd MLL
- Playoffs: Won Steinfeld Cup

The 2009 Toronto Nationals season was the first for the franchise. Their first game in the MLL was on May 15, 2009, against Washington Bayhawks, which they won 17–16. They also won their first home game over the Chicago Machine 15–11. The Nationals qualified for the playoffs as the second seed with a 7–5 record and the best offense in MLL with 184 goals for. The Nationals played their first playoff game against the Long Island Lizards at Navy–Marine Corps Memorial Stadium in Annapolis, Maryland. Toronto won their semi-final matchup 14–13 thanks to a strong game by Merrick Thomson scoring 4 goals. Toronto went on to face the Denver Outlaws in the Steinfeld Cup Final. The Nationals were tied with the Outlaws 9–9 with over a minute to go in the game. Nationals head coach Dave Huntley called a time-out to draw out a strategy. With 45 seconds left to go, Joe Walters passed to Shawn Williams and Williams scored the winning goal to give the Toronto Nationals their first championship victory 10–9 over the Denver Outlaws. Merrick Thomson was named Playoff MVP and Brodie Merrill won the Major League Lacrosse Defensive player of the Year Award.

== Standings ==
W = Wins, L = Losses, PCT = Winning Percentage, GB = Games Back of first place, GF = Goals For, 2ptGF = 2 point Goals For, GA = Goals Against, 2ptGA = 2 point Goals Against

Qualified for playoffs

Team	W	L	PCT	GB	GF	2ptGF	GA	2ptGA
Denver Outlaws	9	3	.750	-	166	8	138	6
Toronto Nationals	7	5	.583	2	184	4	172	9
Long Island Lizards	6	6	.500	3	125	4	144	9
Boston Cannons	6	6	.500	3	173	12	150	6
Washington Bayhawks	5	7	.417	4	148	14	175	9
Chicago Machine	3	9	.250	6	159	8	176	11

Long Island finished ahead of Boston based on a head to head record of 3-0.

== Schedule ==
Week	Date	Opponent	Field	Result	Attendance	Record
1	May 15	@ Bayhawks	Navy–Marine Corps Memorial Stadium	17–16	3,715	1–0
2	May 22	Machine	BMO Field	17–16	5,144	2–0
3	May 29	Lizards	BMO Field	13–9	3,424	2–1
4	June 4	@ Bayhawks	Navy–Marine Corps Memorial Stadium	17–15	3,216	3–1
5	June 13	Bayhawks	BMO Field	19–12	3,544	4–1
6	June 20	@ Outlaws	Invesco Field at Mile High	15–8	8,216	4–2
7	June 25	@ Cannons	Harvard Stadium	19–15	7,532	4–3
7	June 27	Outlaws	BMO Field	20–16	3,791	4–4
8	July 4	@ Machine	Glenbrook South High School	24–19	1,338	4–5
10	July 18	@ Lizards	James M. Shuart Stadium	19–9	7,621	5–5
11	July 23	Cannons	BMO Field	18–17 (OT)	3,542	6–5
13	August 8	Outlaws	BMO Field	16–10	3,635	7–5

== Playoffs ==
Round	Date	Opponent	Field	Result	Attendance
MLL Semifinal	August 22	Lizards	Navy–Marine Corps Memorial Stadium	14–13	6,720
Steinfeld Cup	August 23	@ Outlaws	Navy–Marine Corps Memorial Stadium	10–9	7,003
