= Perfect season =

Sports accomplishment

A perfect season is a sports season, including any requisite playoff portion, in which a team remains and finishes undefeated (and typically, untied). The feat is extremely rare at the professional level of any team sport but has occurred more commonly at the collegiate and scholastic levels in the United States. A perfect regular season (known by other names outside the United States) is a season excluding any playoffs, where a team remains undefeated; it is less rare than a complete perfect season but still exceptional.

Exhibition games are generally not counted toward standings, for or against. For example, the 1972 Miami Dolphins lost three of their preseason exhibition games but are considered to have had a perfect season.

== Basketball ==
No National Basketball Association team has ever had a perfect season. As of 2025, the 2015–16 Golden State Warriors have the best ever regular-season record in the NBA, with a record of 73–9, breaking the 1995–96 Chicago Bulls record of 72–10. However, the Warriors lost the 2016 NBA Finals to the Cleveland Cavaliers.

Two NBA teams have had nearly perfect regular seasons at their home arenas:

- The 1985–86 Boston Celtics finished with a 37–1 (.974) record at Boston Garden (the Celtics also won three home games at the Hartford Civic Center to bring that mark to 40-1) .The Celtics' only home loss occurred on December 6, 1985, to the Portland Trail Blazers by the score of 121–103. The Celtics also won all 10 of their home games (all in the Garden) in the postseason to finish 50–1 at home.
- The 2015–16 San Antonio Spurs also finished with a 40–1 (.976) record at AT&T Center. The Spurs' only regular-season home loss occurred on April 10, 2016, to the Golden State Warriors by the score of 92–86. In the playoffs, however, the Spurs were 3–2 at home, losing twice to the Oklahoma City Thunder in the conference semifinals to finish 43–3 (.935) at home.

Basketball leagues outside the NBA tend to have fewer games per season, thus making a perfect season more achievable:

- Khimik won the 2014–15 Ukrainian Basketball SuperLeague by winning all 30 regular season games, and winning all playoff games, for a 36–0 overall record.
- The American Basketball Association (2000–present) has seen four perfect seasons:
  - Shreveport-Bossier Mavericks (2013–14 and 2014–15)
  - Jacksonville Giants (2020–21)
  - Chicago Fury (2024–25)
- In 2017, the three-on-three league BIG3, which featured an eight-game regular season and two-round playoff, had a perfect team in its inaugural season when Trilogy swept all ten games on their schedule.
- Fenerbahçe Women's Basketball team scored a perfect season in the 2023–24 Women's Basketball Super League by winning all 28 season games. The team also won all the championships that they competed in during the 2023–24 season: Turkish Women's Basketball Cup, FIBA Europe SuperCup Women and EuroLeague Women.
- Potawatomi Fire of The Basketball League had a perfect season in 2024 They had another perfect season in 2026.
- Raleigh Aces of the Women's American Basketball Association had a perfect season in 2024

== Cricket ==
=== County cricket ===
English first-class county cricket has existed as the top tier of domestic cricket in England since the middle nineteenth century, and until the 1950s, it was up to the highest standard of the game. Seasons have varied in length: before the 1880s, they were generally less than ten matches in length and some "first-class" counties played only against one or two different opponents. Between 1887 and 1929, seasons were gradually increased in length to a standard twenty-eight matches for all counties. However, because of the development and popularity of one-day cricket, seasons have been reduced to twenty-four games in 1969 and twenty in 1972, though this was increased by two in 1977 and 1983. With an increase to four days for all games, sixteen or seventeen games have been played since 1993.

Also, because of improvements to pitches via the heavy roller and covering to protect from rain, the proportion of games "drawn" (not finished) has steadily risen since the 1870s.

Since tables of results have been kept in 1864, the only team to have competed a true perfect season—winning outright every game—was Yorkshire in 1867 when led by George Freeman's and Tom Emmett's deadly fast bowling on uncovered and unrolled pitches, they won all seven county games.

Since 1868 numerous county teams in longer schedules have finished a season unbeaten, but none have managed to win every single game outright:

English first-class county teams with no losses in a season (qualification 8 or more games)
| Season | Team | Wins | Losses | Draws | Remarks |
|---|---|---|---|---|---|
| 1864 | Surrey | 6 | 0 | 2 | Also defeated a combined England team by eight wickets |
| 1876 | Gloucestershire | 5 | 0 | 3 | W. G. Grace scored over 1,000 runs in August including the first two triple centuries in first-class cricket |
| 1877 | Gloucestershire | 7 | 0 | 1 | Defeated England by five wickets |
| 1881 | Lancashire | 10 | 0 | 3 | One match against Middlesex cancelled because Harrow Wanderers booked Lord's |
| 1884 | Nottinghamshire | 9 | 0 | 1 | Only draw against Surrey in August Bank Holiday game saw Surrey with three wickets in hand and 153 runs to win |
| 1886 | Nottinghamshire | 7 | 0 | 7 | |
| 1900 | Yorkshire | 16 | 0 | 12 | Lost only two games, both at home to Somerset between 1900 and 1902. Did lose to MCC at Lord's with J. T. Hearne taking nine for 71 on a perfect pitch. |
| 1904 | Lancashire | 16 | 0 | 10 | |
| 1907 | Nottinghamshire | 15 | 0 | 4 | One match abandoned against Yorkshire. Hallam and Wass took 298 wickets between them in very wet summer |
| 1908 | Yorkshire | 16 | 0 | 12 | |
| 1925 | Yorkshire | 21 | 0 | 11 | Most games and most wins by unbeaten county team |
| 1926 | Yorkshire | 14 | 0 | 17 | Finished second, narrowly behind Lancashire who won seventeen games and lost two. Played seventy-one games without loss before losing to Warwickshire on May 23, 1927 |
| 1928 | Lancashire | 15 | 0 | 15 | Went 35 games without loss and overall lost only once in eighty-three county games before losing to Sussex on May 24, 1929. |
| 1928 | Yorkshire | 8 | 0 | 20 | Finished fourth of seventeen teams Played fifty-six unbeaten county matches before losing to Kent on July 1, 1929, but only won fourteen of these |
| 1930 | Lancashire | 10 | 0 | 18 | Had lost only four of last 135 games at end of season. |
| 1969 | Glamorgan | 11 | 0 | 13 | |
| 1972 | Warwickshire | 9 | 0 | 11 | |
| 1973 | Hampshire | 10 | 0 | 10 | |
| 1974 | Lancashire | 5 | 0 | 15 | Finished only eighth of seventeen teams Lowest win percentage by unbeaten county team |
| 1998 | Leicestershire | 11 | 0 | 6 | Lost only two games between 1996 and 1998 |
| 1999 | Surrey | 12 | 0 | 5 | Last season of single-division Championship |
| 2004 | Warwickshire | 5 | 0 | 11 | First Division |
| 2008 | Warwickshire | 5 | 0 | 11 | Second Division |
| 2009 | Durham | 8 | 0 | 8 | First Division |
| 2012 | Yorkshire | 5 | 0 | 11 | Finished second in Second Division |

== American football ==
=== Pre-NFL era and competing leagues ===
Predecessors to the National Football League such as the Ohio League, New York Pro Football League and Western Pennsylvania Professional Football Circuit had many perfect seasons:

- In western Pennsylvania, the 1900 and 1901 Homestead Library and Athletic Club teams and the 1903 Franklin Athletic Club had perfect seasons.
- In Ohio, the Massillon Tigers (1904, 1905), Akron Indians (1909), Shelby Blues (1911), and Dayton Triangles (1918) all had perfect seasons during this era.
- In 1918, the Buffalo Niagaras went 5–0–0 (6–0–0 including a forfeit) in 1918, in a league that consisted of teams entirely from the city of Buffalo in 1918.
- In 1920, the Union Club of Phoenixville played in a league consisting mostly of local teams and earned a perfect season, claiming for itself a mythical national championship.

The caliber of talent in these leagues was neither high nor consistent, the seasons were generally shorter than in the modern NFL, and it was common for top teams to play all their games at home while lesser teams played all of their games on the road. In 1918, for example, Dayton and Buffalo had the additional advantage of having its strongest competitors suspend operations due to the Spanish flu and the First World War, restrictions that also prevented the two teams from playing each other. Thus, it was much easier to earn a perfect season than it would become in the NFL.

==== 1937 Los Angeles Bulldogs ====
In 1937, the Los Angeles Bulldogs joined the second American Football League after the Cleveland Rams defected to the NFL. Playing a combination of AFL teams and independent franchises (such as the Providence Steam Roller and the Salinas Packers), the team went 16–0, with 8 wins coming against AFL teams. The Pro Football Hall of Fame cites the Bulldogs’ dominance as one of the key factors in the AFL's demise, and as an independent team the next season, the Bulldogs finished with a 10–2–2 record, including a 2–1–2 record against NFL teams. Several of the team's players were invited to play on the "Pro All Stars" team in the NFL's first Pro All-Star Game in Los Angeles, and the Bulldogs are considered to be one of the few independent teams to have ever achieved parity with the NFL.

==== 1948 Cleveland Browns ====
In 1948, the Cleveland Browns of the All-America Football Conference won all fourteen regular season games and the AAFC championship to finish the season with a 14–0–0 record. Cleveland's perfect 1948 season was part of a string of 29 straight wins from 1947 to 1949, including both the 1947 and 1948 title games. On April 1, 2025, the NFL voted to recognize AAFC statistics, awarding the 1948 Browns full recognition of a perfect season.

=== 1972 Miami Dolphins ===
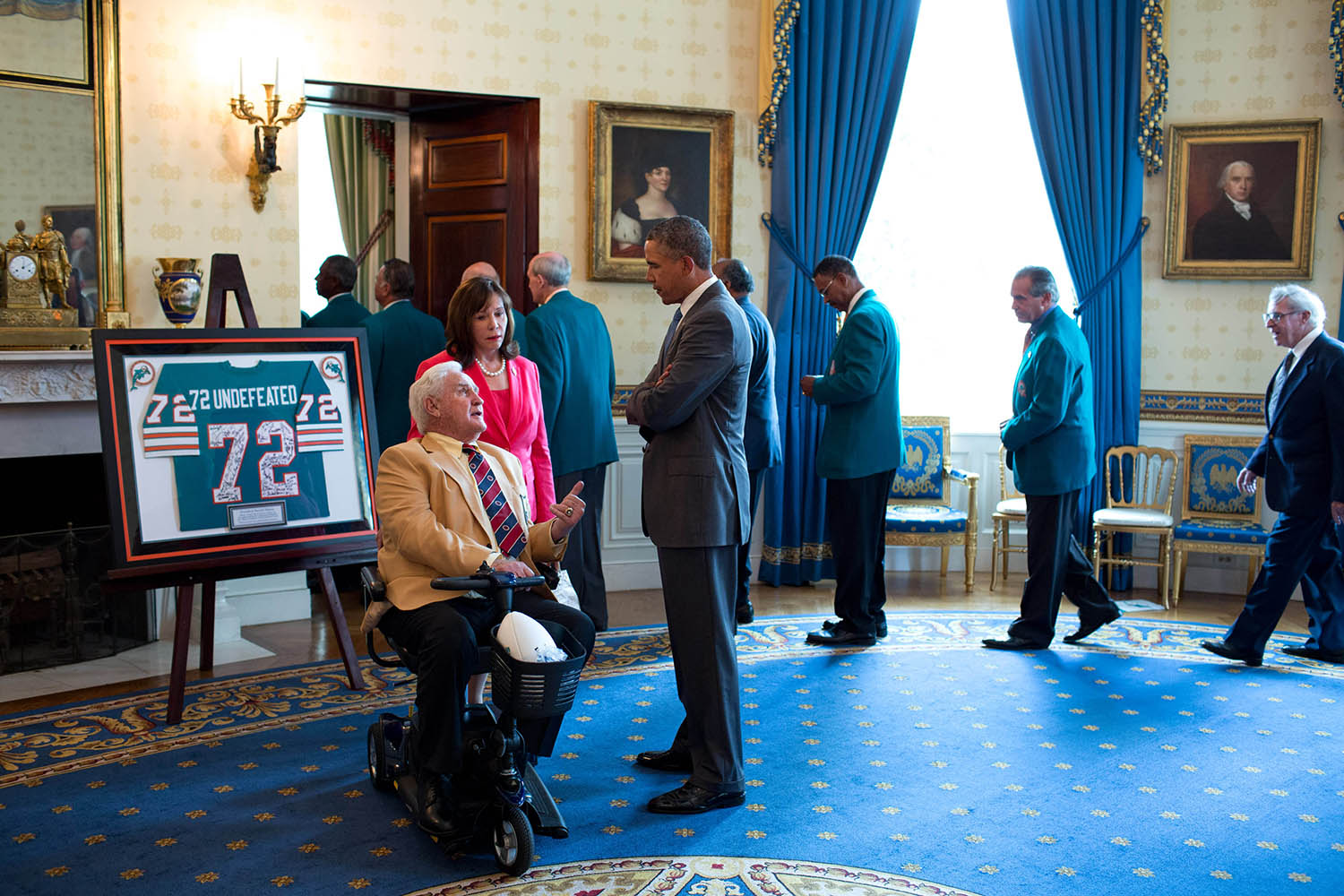
President Barack Obama talks with former Miami Dolphins coach Don Shula in the Blue Room prior to a ceremony honoring the 1972 Super Bowl Champion Miami Dolphins at the White House, August 20, 2013.

Since the National Football League began in 1920, only one team has played a perfect season: the 1972 Miami Dolphins, who won all fourteen of their regular season games and three postseason games, including Super Bowl VII, to finish the season 17–0–0.

It has often been reported that the surviving members of the 1972 Dolphins would, every season when the final undefeated team earned its first loss of the year, either gather to drink champagne or send a case of champagne to the team who beat this final undefeated team. Don Shula, the head coach of the 1972 Dolphins, denied this in a 2007 interview with ESPN.

On August 20, 2013, four decades after their accomplishment, President Barack Obama hosted the 1972 Dolphins noting that they "never got their White House visit".

=== Near perfect seasons ===
==== Undefeated seasons (with ties) before introduction of playoffs ====
Until the development of a playoff system in the NFL in 1932, there were four teams who completed seasons undefeated with one or more tied games: the 1920 Akron Pros, the 1922 Canton Bulldogs, the 1923 Canton Bulldogs, and the 1929 Green Bay Packers. According to the 2012 NFL Record & Fact Book, under NFL practices from 1920 to 1971, tie games were not included in winning percentage, giving these four teams perfect winning percentages of 1.000.

The 1921 Buffalo All-Americans were controversially denied an undefeated season because they believed that their final game, a 10–7 loss to the Chicago Staleys, was an exhibition game which would not count in the final standings. The NFL recorded that game as official and Buffalo's record as 9–1–2.

| Team | Wins | Losses | Ties |
|---|---|---|---|
| 1920 Akron Pros season | 8 | 0 | 3 |
| 1922 Canton Bulldogs season | 10 | 0 | 2 |
| 1923 Canton Bulldogs season | 11 | 0 | 1 |
| 1929 Green Bay Packers season | 12 | 0 | 1 |

==== NFL perfect regular seasons ====
Apart from the 1972 Dolphins, three NFL teams have completed undefeated and untied regular seasons: the 1934 Chicago Bears, the 1942 Chicago Bears, and the 2007 New England Patriots. Each lost in the playoffs:

- In 1934, the Bears played a 13–0–0 regular season and became the first NFL team to complete an unbeaten and untied regular season but lost the 1934 NFL Championship Game against the New York Giants.
- Despite losing several players and head coach George Halas to military service in World War II, the 1942 Bears finished the regular season 11–0–0 but lost the NFL Championship Game to the Washington Redskins.
- The 2007 Patriots were the first and only team to finish the regular season undefeated under the 16-game schedule used from 1978 to 2020. The Patriots won the divisional and conference playoff games but were upset in Super Bowl XLII by the New York Giants in dramatic fashion, giving them a final record of 18–1.

| Team | Wins | Losses | Playoff results | Final result |
|---|---|---|---|---|
| 1934 Chicago Bears season | 13 | 0 | Lost NFL Championship Game against New York Giants | 13–1 |
| 1942 Chicago Bears season | 11 | 0 | Lost NFL Championship Game against Washington Redskins | 11–1 |
| 2007 New England Patriots season | 16 | 0 | Won two playoff games before losing in Super Bowl XLII against New York Giants | 18–1 |

=== Near-perfect NFL and AFL seasons since 1961 ===
Since the NFL expanded to a fourteen-game regular season in 1961, eleven teams in the NFL and AFL have had regular seasons with one loss and no ties (or better):

| Team | Wins | Losses | Playoff results | Final result |
|---|---|---|---|---|
| 1962 Green Bay Packers | 13 | 1 | Won NFL Championship Game | 14–1 |
| 1967 Oakland Raiders | 13 | 1 | Lost Super Bowl II | 14–2 |
| 1968 Baltimore Colts | 13 | 1 | Lost Super Bowl III | 15–2 |
| 1976 Oakland Raiders | 13 | 1 | Won Super Bowl XI | 16–1 |
| 1982 Washington Redskins (Note: The 1982 NFL season was shortened due to a player's strike that year.) | 8 | 1 | Won Super Bowl XVII | 12–1 |
| 1984 San Francisco 49ers | 15 | 1 | Won Super Bowl XIX | 18–1 |
| 1985 Chicago Bears | 15 | 1 | Won Super Bowl XX | 18–1 |
| 1998 Minnesota Vikings | 15 | 1 | Lost NFC Championship Game | 16–2 |
| 2004 Pittsburgh Steelers | 15 | 1 | Lost AFC Championship Game | 16–2 |
| 2011 Green Bay Packers | 15 | 1 | Lost divisional round game | 15–2 |
| 2015 Carolina Panthers | 15 | 1 | Lost Super Bowl 50 | 17–2 |

Most of these teams suffered their only regular-season loss early in the season. Only the 1962 Packers (10–0), 1985 Bears (12–0), 2011 Packers (13–0), and 2015 Panthers (14–0) were on track for a perfect season when they lost. Coincidentally, the 1985 Bears’ lone loss came to the Miami Dolphins.

The best start from an NFL team who failed to complete a perfect regular season is shared by two teams: the 2009 Indianapolis Colts, who started 14–0 before losing their final two regular season games to the New York Jets and the Buffalo Bills to finish 14–2, and the 2015 Carolina Panthers, who went 14–0 before losing to the Atlanta Falcons and going on to finish the regular season 15–1. The 2009 Colts, having clinched the top seed in the AFC, sacrificed their chances at a perfect regular season and instead rested their starters the final two games to protect them for the playoffs, on orders from then General Manager Bill Polian. The Colts faced immense criticism from their players, their fans, and the media for letting their chances of a perfect season slip away. The Colts would go on to Super Bowl XLIV but lost to the New Orleans Saints. The 2015 Panthers were not resting their starters at the time of their loss (at the time, the Arizona Cardinals were 13–2 and still had an opportunity to surpass the Panthers for the top seed in the NFC).

Four other teams have started 13–0 before losing in their fourteenth game: the 1998 Denver Broncos, 2005 Indianapolis Colts, 2009 New Orleans Saints and 2011 Green Bay Packers (Of those near-perfect seasons, the 2005 Colts and the 2011 Packers did not win a single playoff game). The 1998 Broncos, 2005 Colts and 2009 Saints lost at least two of their final three games but the Broncos and Saints recovered to win the Super Bowl. The 1953 Cleveland Browns and 1969 Los Angeles Rams started 11–0 in twelve- and fourteen-game seasons respectively; both lost their only playoff game.

=== Other leagues ===
The following is a list of teams in minor or alternate leagues that compiled perfect seasons of six games or more, including postseason games, with no ties:

- The Hollywood Bears, a member of the Pacific Coast Professional Football League, went 8–0–0 in 1941.
- The Hollywood Rangers were a member of the American Football League of 1944 (formerly the Northwest War Industries League), a short-lived competitor to the Pacific Coast Professional Football League on the West Coast. In their 1944 season, they went 11–0–0 and defeated the PCPFL champion San Diego Bombers (who had also had a perfect season in their league, going 9–0–0) in a two-game series.
- The Charleston Rockets of the Continental Football League won all 14 games of the league's inaugural season in 1965, going on to defeat the Toronto Rifles in the league's championship.
- The Hartford Knights went 17–0–0 in 1972 as a member of the Seaboard Football League, including a victory over the Chambersburg Cardinals in the league's championship. The Knights, unhappy with the level of competition (many of the Knights games had margins of victory of 40 points or more), quit the league the following year.

In indoor football, the following teams have had perfect seasons:

- The Quad City Steamwheelers went undefeated in the inaugural season of arenafootball2, accruing a record of 19–0–0 including playoffs and an ArenaCup I win.
- The Ohio Valley Greyhounds of the National Indoor Football League accrued a perfect season in 2003.
- The Sioux Falls Storm of United Indoor Football won back-to-back perfect seasons in 2006 and 2007, winning the United Bowl championship both years.
- The Fayetteville Guard won a perfect season in 2007 in the NIFL.
- The Rochester Raiders won a perfect season in 2008 in the Continental Indoor Football League, but withdrew from that league during the playoffs in a dispute.
- The Chicago Slaughter won a perfect season in 2009 in the CIFL.
- The Baltimore Mariners won a perfect season in 2010 in the American Indoor Football Association.
- The Erie Explosion won a perfect season in 2013 in the Continental Indoor Football league, winning all ten regular season games, a semifinal playoff, and the CIFL Championship.
- The Omaha Beef won a perfect season in 2023 in the CIF and again in 2024 in the NAL. The Beef's two-year winning streak would be broken in 2025 with a surprise loss to the semi-pro Minneapolis Warriors at the start of the 2025 season.
- The Columbus Lions won all games in the 2023 AIFA season and the 2024 AIF season.
- The Albany Firebirds won all games in the 2025 Arena Football One season, including a win in Arena Crown 2025.

At least twenty-three other semi-professional football teams have had perfect seasons, seven of them being at least 17 games long. The Chambersburg Cardinals won a record 72 straight games between 1977 and 1984.

There were no perfect seasons (or even perfect regular seasons) in the American Association, World Football League, either incarnation of the United States Football League, the original XFL, any of the three incarnations of the Arena Football League or the Alliance of American Football, all of which are now defunct. The 2009–2012 incarnation of the United Football League had two perfect regular seasons, but neither qualify for the list: the 2009 Florida Tuskers finished 6–0, but that team lost the subsequent championship game; the 2012 Las Vegas Locomotives had a record of 4–0 when the league abruptly suspended operations halfway through the season. Likewise, the 2020 Houston Roughnecks of the second incarnation of the XFL were undefeated at 5–0 at the time the season was canceled due to the COVID-19 pandemic in the United States.

The 1933 Providence Huskies (possibly a successor to the Providence Steam Roller) played arguably the most perfect season ever recorded by a professional or semi-professional team: a ten-game season in which they won every game and did not concede a single point during any game.

=== Leagues outside North America ===
In the 2014 German Football League the Braunschweig Lions compiled a perfect season (12–0 postseason 3–0), losing only in the BIG6 European Football League which is a different competition. They crowned the season with another German Bowl triumph. Similarly in the 2016 German Football League the Schwäbisch Hall Unicorns achieved a perfect regular season with a 14–0 record, similarly their lone defeat came in the BIG6 European Football League which is not considered for league standings. However, unlike Braunschweig before them, Schwäbisch Hall ultimately lost the German Bowl, in this case to Braunschweig. In the 2017 German Football League season, Schwäbisch Hall once more compiled a perfect season (14–0) but this time also won the German Bowl, again against Braunschweig. Interestingly, their opponent in the final had also entered the game with a 14–0 regular season record. Overall the Schwäbisch Hall Unicorns posted five consecutive perfect regular seasons (GFL games only) between 2016 and 2021 (both inclusive) — their only losses in that span coming in German Bowl XXXVIII (2016), German Bowl XLI (2019), and German Bowl XLII (2021).

In 2023 Rhein Fire managed a perfect season in the European League of Football with 12 wins in the regular season and 2 wins in the playoffs including the final of the league.

== Association football ==
=== Domestic teams ===
No association football team has ever achieved a perfect season across all competitions entered, but some have achieved a perfect record in their respective domestic league competitions, although that feat itself is rare. The earliest known perfect league season is that of Rangers F.C. of Scotland who, in 1898–99, won all of their 18 Scottish League Division One matches. Other football clubs to have achieved perfect league seasons since then are: Racing Club of Argentina in 1919 (13 wins out of 13), Al-Arabi of Kuwait in 1961–62 (12 wins out of 12), Ferencvárosi of Hungary in 1931–32 (22 wins out of 22), Dresdner SC of Germany in 1942–43 (23), Sunrise Flacq United of Mauritius in 1995–96 (22), and Nacional of Uruguay in 1941 (20). FC Bayern Munich managed an 11–0–0 perfect record en route to winning the 2019–20 UEFA Champions League, the first team to do so. The competition's format was reformulated in a single elimination match since the quarterfinals due to COVID-19 pandemic in Europe and its following lockdown.

Many teams have achieved an unbeaten domestic season with zero losses, but with several draws.

In women's football, English club Arsenal won the 2006–07 FA Women's Premier League with a perfect record (22–0–0) in their 2006–07 season, alongside the FA Cup, Premier League Cup, Community Shield, London County Cup, and UEFA Women's Cup for a season record in all competitions of 42 wins and 2 draws out of 44 games played, with their only draws coming in the first and second legs of the UEFA Women's Cup semi-final and final respectively, an unprecedented feat. Italian club Juventus become the first to win the Serie A with a perfect record (22–0–0) in the 2020–21 season, an unprecedented feat in Italian men's or women's football history. The following season, FC Barcelona did the same in Spain's Women's Primera División with 30 wins from 30 matches.

=== FIFA World Cup ===
The likelihood of a national team in the FIFA World Cup winning all its matches in regulation time to become the champion is much higher than most clubs in their domestic league, as the finals tournament in its current format lasts only eight games. This feat has been achieved three times, by Uruguay in the inaugural 1930 tournament (four matches), and by Brazil in 1970 (six matches) and 2002 (seven matches). This is not counting the qualifying round of the tournament, which lasts over a year and has had a varied format since 1934. Only the Brazilian team of 1970 has won every game in the qualification and final rounds of a single tournament, a total of 13 games. As there was no qualifying phase for the 1930 tournament, Uruguay also won all the games they played to become champions.

=== FIFA Women's World Cup ===
Through 2011, the likelihood of a national team winning all of its matches in the FIFA Women's World Cup was slightly greater than in the men's version. The Women's World Cup began in 1991 with 12 teams and expanded to 16 effective in 1999. Under both structures, the winning team only had to win six games (three in group play and three in the knockout stage) to win the title unbeaten. The tournament expanded to 24 teams in 2015, at which time the number of games that the champion must play increased to seven (the same total as in the men's World Cup).

The 2011 event, won by Japan, was the first in which the champion lost in group play; the other finalist, the United States, had also lost in group play. Each previous team to have won the title — the United States in 1991 and 1999, Norway in 1995, and Germany in 2003 and 2007 — won all of its group stage matches. In fact, only one of these teams, the United States in 1999, had a knockout match go to extra time—specifically the final against China, which ultimately went to a penalty shootout. Germany won all of its matches in the 2007 final tournament without giving up a goal, becoming the first team in either the men's or women's World Cup to accomplish this feat. The United States' third championship team in 2015 had one draw in the group stage; in 2019, the United States won all seven games in regulation, by a combined score of 26–3, en route to their fourth title.

As of the 2019 tournament, four undefeated, untied Women's World Cup champions also went through their qualifying stage without a loss or draw:

- United States, 1991 (5 wins, 49 goals for, 0 against)
- Germany, 2003 (6 wins, 30 goals for, 1 against)
- Germany, 2007 (8 wins, 31 goals for, 3 against)
- United States, 2019 (5 wins, 26 goals for, 0 against)

Of the other two teams to win the Women's World Cup without a loss or draw in the finals:

- Norway went through their 1995 qualification campaign with 8 wins, 1 draw and 1 loss.
- The United States automatically qualified for the 1999 edition as hosts.

== Australian rules football ==
=== Australian Football League (AFL) ===
The Australian Football League (AFL) began in 1897 as the Victorian Football League (VFL); initially based entirely in the state of Victoria, it expanded through the 1980s and 1990s to become the highest-level national competition in the sport of Australian rules football. The length of a complete season (including finals matches) has typically been between 18 and 26 games. Throughout the history of the league, no team has ever completed a perfect season. One team, Collingwood in 1929, completed a perfect home-and-away season, finishing with a record of 18–0; the club won the premiership, but did not complete a perfect season after losing the second semi-final against Richmond.

=== South Australian National Football League (SANFL) ===
The SANFL has existed since 1877 within South Australia. The only perfect season to be completed was by the 1914 Port Adelaide team, known as the "Invincibles". Port won all four of its pre season matches. It finished the minor round with a 12–0 record, before winning both finals to finish with a 14–0 record and a perfect season. They also won the Championship of Australia against VFL premiers Carlton, to extend that record to 15–0. In addition to this the club played a combined team from all the other SAFL clubs and won to extend the record to 16–0. The closest any team got to Port Adelaide was North Adelaide, losing by 21 points in Round 10. This is the only instance in the big three Australian football leagues (VFL/SANFL/WAFL) where a club has gone undefeated in the pre-season, season main and post season.

In 1912, Port Adelaide had a perfect minor round and then beat West Torrens in its semi-final but lost both the final and Grand Final to West Adelaide.

=== West Australian Football League (WAFL) ===
The WAFL has existed since 1885 within Western Australia. The 1946 East Fremantle team was the first club in senior WAFL football (Note: In the 1944 under-19 wartime competition that replaced the senior competition between 1942 and that season due to the player drain of World War II, East Perth managed a perfect season, winning all nineteen home-and-away games plus two finals.) to have managed a perfect season, winning all twenty-one of its games; it is noted that the playing lists of many of its opponents had been seriously depleted by World War II. The only loss for the season came against Victorian club Collingwood in a post season exhibition match. The 2018 Subiaco team was the second team to complete a perfect season, winning all of its 18 games in the minor round before winning both their second-semi-final against South Fremantle and the Grand Final against West Perth.

=== Victorian Football League (VFL) ===
The Victorian Football League, known until 1996 as the Victorian Football Association, began in 1877 and was Victoria's premier football league until 1897, and has been the second-tier league in the state since. Perfect seasons have been completed on five occasions in VFA/VFL history, but only twice in full-length seasons:

1. by North Melbourne during a war-shortened 1915, with a record of 15–0
2. by North Melbourne in 1918, which was also shortened by the war, with a record of 12–0;
3. by Geelong West in 1972 Division 2, with a record of 20–0
4. by Port Melbourne in 2011, with a record of 21–0.
5. by the Footscray reserves during a pandemic-shortened 2021, with a record of 10–0

There were also cases of teams going undefeated through the season in the nineteenth century, but none completed perfect seasons because some of their matches were drawn. Of those, Geelong could be interpreted as having been perfect in 1879; it had a record of 15–0–1, and the draw came by agreement when a match which Geelong led 1–0 was abandoned due to inclement weather.

Four other teams have completed perfect home-and-away seasons, but subsequently lost finals matches:

1. North Melbourne in 1919 won all eighteen home-and-away games before losing to Brunswick in the second-semi-final and Footscray in the Grand Final.
2. Coburg in 1927 won all eighteen home-and away games before drawing with Port Melbourne in the second semi final, losing the replay, then winning the Grand Final.
3. Coburg in 1945 won all twenty home-and-away games before losing to Williamstown in the second semi-final and being eliminated by Port Melbourne in the preliminary final.
4. Williamstown in 1957 won all twenty home-and-away games before losing to Moorabbin in the second semi final, and being eliminated by Port Melbourne in the preliminary final.

== Canadian football ==
A true perfect season (no losses and no ties through the regular season and playoffs) has never been achieved in the modern era of professional Canadian football. Only one team, the 1948 Calgary Stampeders (in the pre-CFL era), has completed a perfect regular season; more on this can be seen below.

The current Canadian Football League schedule in place since 1986 would require a team to win 20 games (18 regular season, 1 playoff after bye week, and the Grey Cup championship) to post a perfect record; the closest any team has come to such since the CFL's establishment in 1958 are the 1981 Edmonton Eskimos, who went 14–1–1 in the regular season, en route to winning their fourth of five straight Grey Cup titles by winning both their playoff games, and the closest since the institution of the 18-game schedule coming in 1989, also set by the Edmonton Eskimos, by going 16–2 in the regular season, only to be upset by the Saskatchewan Roughriders in the West Final.

=== 1948 Calgary Stampeders ===
Under head coach Les Lear, the 1948 Calgary Stampeders completed a perfect regular season with a record of 12–0; they had two wins and a tie during the playoffs to finish with a record of 14–0–1, the only undefeated complete season in Canadian pro history. In the Western Interprovincial Football Union championship (a home-and-home aggregate series decided on total points) against the Regina Roughriders, the first leg was tied 4–4, and the Stampeders won the second 21–10, to win the aggregate 25–14. The Stampeders then defeated the Ottawa Rough Riders 12–7 for the 36th Grey Cup.

Despite the Stampeders' title, their achievement was only lightly regarded in the East. At the time, the Eastern and Western unions played separate regular seasons and met only in the Grey Cup. The Western union was openly regarded to be a weaker competition than the East, and Calgary's win (only the third for a Western team up to that time) was dismissed as a fluke.

== Handball ==
In 2020–21 FC Barcelona Handbol had over all championships a perfect season. They won the following domestic championships: Liga ASOBAL with 34 perfect games, the Copa del Rey de Balonmano, Copa ASOBAL and the Supercopa ASOBAL. At the European level they won the 2020–21 EHF Champions League with 20 perfect games. In total they won 61 games out of 61 in 2020–21.

=== Germany ===
In 2011–12, German handball champion THW Kiel achieved a perfect season of as many as 34 matches. Additionally, the team also won the national DHB Cup and the international EHF Champions League.

=== Spain ===
In the Liga ASOBAL the FC Barcelona Handbol had 4 consecutive perfect seasons from the 2013–14 season to the 2016–17 season.

=== Croatia ===
In the Croatian Handball Premier League the RK Zagreb was unbeaten for 11 years, they won 190 consecutive games, last time they lost against Osijek Motormodul (38:39) on April 14, 2007. In that 190 games they just have one tie with RK Poreč (31:31), after that game they won 178 games in a row.

== Lacrosse ==
In professional lacrosse, the 1993 Buffalo Bandits are the only team to have won a perfect season in the National Lacrosse League. The Bandits won all eight of their regular season games and won the championship in a two-round tournament; the season was the continuation of a multi-season winning streak that dated to the Bandits’ successful run for the previous year's championship.

In Major League Lacrosse, which began play in 2001, the 2013 Denver Outlaws were the first team to complete a perfect regular season, winning all fourteen of their games. After beating the Hamilton Nationals, the Outlaws had a sequence of twenty consecutive regular season wins despite losing the 2012 championship. However, the Outlaws lost in the first round of the playoffs to the Charlotte Hounds, who had only gone 7–7 in the regular season.

== Netball ==
=== Commonwealth Bank Trophy ===
The Commonwealth Bank Trophy was the main national netball competition in Australia from 1997 to 2007. There were eight teams in a double round robin format and finals.

The Sydney Swifts were the only team to achieve a perfect season, winning all fourteen regular season games and both their finals matches for a record of 16–0.

=== ANZ Championship ===
The ANZ Championship, the principal netball competition for Australia and New Zealand was established in 2008 to replace the Commonwealth Bank Trophy. Comprising ten teams (five from Australia and five from New Zealand) there has so far been one perfect season, by the Mission Queensland Firebirds, based in Brisbane, Queensland, in 2011. The Firebirds won thirteen regular season games and both their finals matches for a record of 15–0. In 2010, the New South Wales Swifts managed to win all thirteen regular season games, but lost both of their finals matches and ended with a 13–2 for that year.

=== Netball Superleague ===
The Netball Superleague, the principal netball competition in the United Kingdom following its founding in 2005, has seen three invincible seasons in its history. Team Bath finished both the 2006–07 and 2008–09 seasons unbeaten, going 14–0 and 16–0 respectively in the regular season before winning the grand final. The most recent team to achieve this feat was Manchester Thunder in the 2022 season, who went 20–0 in the regular season before seeing off Team Bath and Loughborough Lightning in the playoffs.

== Rugby league ==
=== National Rugby League ===
The National Rugby League has existed since 1908, being originally known as the New South Wales Rugby League and before the Super League war of 1995 as the Australian Rugby League. In its history, only one team has completed a perfect season: the South Sydney Rabbitohs in 1925, who won all twelve games contested.

Five other teams have gone undefeated but featured at least one drawn match: Balmain (1915), North Sydney (1921), Eastern Suburbs (1936 and 1937) and St George (1959).

=== Brisbane Rugby League ===
The Brisbane Rugby League premiership began in 1909 and continued in varying forms until 1996, after which it was superseded by the Queensland Cup. Between the 1930s and the 1960s it was of comparable standard to the New South Wales Rugby Football League, but subsequently a huge drain of players to Sydney eroded the standard of play. Before World War II seasons were typically no more than twelve games long; however as the competition grew it was expanded to 21 games by 1960. The only BRL teams to manage a perfect season were:

| Season | Team | Wins | Losses | Draws | Remarks |
|---|---|---|---|---|---|
| 1955 | Fortitude Valley | 20 | 0 | 0 | Longest perfect season in Australian rugby league. |
| 1920 | Western Suburbs | 15 | 0 | 0 | Season was split into two halves, plus the finals |

The following team managed an undefeated season but drew one game:

| Season | Team | Wins | Losses | Draws | Remarks |
|---|---|---|---|---|---|
| 1922 | Western Suburbs | 11 | 0 | 1 | Season was split into two halves, plus the finals, of which Wests won both. Team would fall to last in 1923 with just two victories. |

The following teams managed an undefeated home-and-away season, but subsequently lost finals matches:

| Season | Team | Wins (Note: The record given below is for the full season including all finals.) | Losses | Draws | Remarks |
|---|---|---|---|---|---|
| 1938 | Fortitude Valley | 11 | 1 | 0 | Went 10–0–0 in home-and-away season and won the major semi-final, but lost Grand Final 16–10 to Northern Suburbs. |
| 1930 | Carlton | 11 | 1 | 1 | Went 9–0–1 in regular season and won semi-final. Lost final to Fortitude Valley 0–10, but bounced back to win Grand Final 19–8 against same opponent. |

=== British Rugby League ===
Whilst no rugby league team in Britain has completed the perfect season in the top flight, this has been achieved on four occasions in lower divisions; twice in the 2nd division and twice in the 3rd. Hull F.C. achieved this feat in the 1978–79 Season, where they won 26 from 26 games, gaining promotion to the top division for the second time in three seasons. This was also achieved by the Dewsbury Rams in 2009 during their Championship 1 (third division) season where they won all 18 games from a possible 18, winning promotion immediately after being relegated the previous season where they won just two games. Since their 2009 promotion, the Rams have so far stayed in the sports' second division, including two play off finishes. The third occasion came in 2021 when Toulouse Olympique finished the 2021 Championship with a 100% record having won 13 games and awarded a 14th as a walkover. The season was badly affected by postponements and cancellations caused by restrictions imposed under COVID-19 regulations and Toulouse only managed to play 13 games (all away) while all the other teams in the division played 20 to 22 games.

The fourth occasion was in 2022 when Keighley Cougars won all 20 games in taking the League 1 title.

In 2017, the Toronto Wolfpack completed the regular reason with a perfect 15–0 record, however after the Super 8s they finished with a 20–1–1 record. They lost in the Challenge Cup against the Salford Red Devils.

== Rugby union ==
=== International Rugby ===
The New Zealand All Blacks were the first professional rugby team to produce a perfect rugby test season, in 2013. They successfully defeated France four times, Australia three times, South Africa and Argentina twice and also beat Japan, England and Ireland in their incredible winning run. They produced a record of 14–0–0, defeating the top 5 ranked teams below them in the IRB world rankings. England have matched this feat after producing a perfect test season in 2016 (winning all 13 matches) after recovering from getting knocked out of their own World Cup in 2015.

The French recorded a perfect season in 2022 having won all 13 matches.

=== Super Rugby ===
The Southern Hemisphere's principal team competition, Super Rugby, established as Super 12 in 1996 and later known as Super 14 before adopting its current name in 2011, has seen only one perfect season. The Crusaders, based in Christchurch and representing a large portion of the South Island of New Zealand, finished the 2002 Super 12 season with an 11–0–0 record and went on to win both of their finals matches to claim the season crown unbeaten.

One other team has won a championship unbeaten: in 1997, the Auckland Blues (known simply as "Blues" since 2000), which at the time represented the central and southern parts of the Auckland area plus some adjacent regions to the south, finished the regular season with one draw from 11 matches. They also won both of their finals matches to claim the title.

=== Súper Liga Americana de Rugby/Super Rugby Americas ===
In the 2021 season of Súper Liga Americana de Rugby (now Super Rugby Americas), former Super Rugby club Jaguares XV completed a perfect season, finishing with a 10–0–0 record en route to a 36–28 victory over Peñarol in the final. The Jaguares outscored opponents by an average margin of 43.4 points and led the league with six All-SLAR First Team selections.

=== Major League Rugby ===
In the 2026 MLR season, the Chicago Hounds became the first team in league history to finish with a perfect season, going 10–0–0 en route to a 35–17 victory over the California Legion in the MLR Championship Final.

== Tennis (team) ==
In 2011 and 2012, the Washington Kastles of World Team Tennis completed back-to-back perfect seasons, the first pro sports franchise in the United States to do so. The Kastles swept each of the 2011 and 2012 regular seasons with a perfect 14–0 record, then in each season went on to win their two postseason games and league's championship, amassing a 32-game winning streak in the process. This streak stands one short of the all-time professional sports record in the United States by the 1971–72 Los Angeles Lakers.

== Volleyball ==
In the 2012–13 Season, Vakıfbank İstanbul won all 52 games and reached five championship trophies in

- 2012–13 Turkish Women's Volleyball League,
- 2012–13 Turkish Women's Volleyball Cup,
- 2012–13 CEV Women's Champions League,
- 2013 Turkish Women's Volleyball Super Cup and
- 2013 FIVB Women's Club World Championship.

Vakıfbank İstanbul won 6 games in Turkish Women's Volleyball Cup, 12 games in CEV Women's Champions League, 29 games (22 league, 7 play-off games) in Turkish Women's Volleyball League, 1 game in Turkish Women's Volleyball Super Cup and 4 games in FIVB Volleyball Women's Club World Championship, and never lost in the 2012–13 Season. In addition, they won all 51 games they played in year 2013. Having started Turkish Women's Volleyball League's 2013–14 Season with 13 wins and 2013–14 CEV Women's Champions League with 8 wins, they extended their winning streak to 73 games as of January 23, 2014.

Turkey women's national volleyball team won 22 consecutive match between June 29 and September 24, 2023. In that period, it completed the Nations League, European Championship and Olympic Qualification Round / FIVB World Cup matches undefeated. Being the first team to do so in history.

== Other North American professional sports leagues ==
In North America's two other major professional sports leagues (Major League Baseball and the National Hockey League), due to the fact there are a large number of games (82 in the NBA, 84 in the NHL, and 162 in Major League Baseball), it is practically impossible for a team to finish with a perfect season. The Women's National Basketball Association's season has been between 28 and 40 games long, and it too has never produced a perfect season.

It is possible for a baseball pitcher to achieve a perfect season, taking at least one win and any number of no-decisions throughout the year. This has happened 1,813 times in baseball's history, though the majority (1,171) were 1–0 seasons, mostly by relief pitchers. The best perfect season belongs to Tom Zachary of the 1929 New York Yankees, who posted a 12–0 record in 119.2 innings. No pitcher has ever achieved a perfect season while qualifying for the ERA title.

In the NHL, the 1976–77 Montreal Canadiens played nearly a perfect home season. They went 39–1 (.975) at home, their lone loss coming on October 30, 1976, against the Boston Bruins. The Canadiens only lost 8 games all year, finishing with a 60–8–12 record.

== Individual professional sports ==
For other sports leagues for individuals, such as the PGA Tour or Formula One, a perfect season would represent winning every event in a season. Considering the number of tournaments or races in those leagues, and the fact that each individual faces over 40 opponents as opposed to one, a perfect season is almost impossible.

=== Auto racing ===
In Formula One, prior to 1991, a driver could only count a certain number of their best results towards the championship, meaning it was possible to score 100 percent of the maximum championship points without winning every race in the season. This was accomplished by Alberto Ascari in 1952 and twice by Jim Clark in 1963 and 1965, both of his championship seasons. The record for the highest percentage of wins in a season was held by Ascari for his 1952 effort in which he won 6 out of 8 (75.00%) races on the calendar. This feat was surpassed by Max Verstappen in the 2023 season with 19 wins out of 22 races (86.36%) in the calendar.

In 1988, the McLaren team won 15 of the 16 Grands Prix held that year. The only race victory that eluded them was the Italian Grand Prix, where their driver Ayrton Senna was eliminated after a collision in the closing stages whilst leading the race.

Colin McRae won every round of the 1992 British Rally Championship, driving a Subaru Legacy for the Prodrive team.

In IndyCar, A. J. Foyt won 10 out of 13 races on his way to his 4th national championship in 1964. In NASCAR, Richard Petty holds most of the records for most wins in a season; he won 27 races out of 48 appearances in 1967, 10 of which were consecutive. Since the number of races in a season was reduced from upwards of 50 to approximately 30 in 1972, Petty also holds the "modern-era" record for most wins in a season with 13, a record he shares with Jeff Gordon.

In 1997, road racer Tommy Kendall started the 13-race SCCA Trans-Am Series season 11–0, the longest documentable win streak in worldwide professional road racing. In the 12th race, Kendall was battling for the lead on the final lap, but spun out and finished second.

The feat would be extremely difficult in a series with a longer schedule, such as the NASCAR Cup Series which has 36 race seasons, Formula One which typically has between 17 and 23 race seasons, or the British Touring Car Championship which typically has 30 race seasons. However, in the 2013 British Formula Ford Championship season, a then support series to BTCC following its schedule, Dan Cammish won all of first 24 out of 30 races and then opted out of the remaining 6 with the championship already decided.

In MotoGP/500cc perfect seasons have been achieved by John Surtees winning 7/7 races in 1959 and Giacomo Agostini winning 10/10 races in 1968. These were in the earlier years of the 500cc championship where the racers were rewarded for their "best of number of races" at the end of the season but they won every race in the season.

In the AMA Motocross Championship, Ricky Carmichael had perfect seasons in 2002 and 2004 winning both races at all 12 rounds in the premier 250cc 2-stroke class. This was repeated by James 'Bubba' Stewart in 2008 when the premier class was 450cc 4-stroke. and then by rookie Jett Lawrence in 2023.

In World Championship motocross Stefan Everts has come the closest with 17 wins in 18 races during the 2006 Motocross World Championship season.

=== Cycling ===
==== Cross-country ====
In the 2017 season the Swiss mountain biker Nino Schurter won 6 out of 6 races and additionally at the World Championships he won the gold medal at the single and at the mixed race and the Cape Epic.

==== Downhill ====
In the 2016 season the British mountain biker Rachel Atherton won 7 out of 7 races and additionally at the World Championships she won the gold medal.

=== Golf ===
Golf instead considers the Grand Slam, a sweep of the four men's major golf championships deemed to be the most difficult contests in professional golf, to be analogous to perfection.

The only time the Grand Slam has been swept in any given year was 1930, when Bobby Jones won all four majors (at the time, The (British) Amateur Championship and U.S. Amateur were still considered majors); since 1934, when The Masters was added as a major, no player has won all four in one year.

Tiger Woods is the only professional golfer to win four consecutive professional majors; he did so over two years in 2000 and 2001. The record for most consecutive wins in professional golf is 11, set Byron Nelson in 1945; Nelson would win 18 tournaments overall that year, a year when wartime manpower shortages were still limiting the number and quality of professional golfers for Nelson to compete against.

=== Tennis ===
Tennis also uses the term Grand Slam for winning all four major tennis tournaments in a single year. This has only been achieved by five players in singles: Don Budge, Rod Laver, Maureen Connolly, Margaret Court and Steffi Graf. Graf was the most recent to achieve the feat, in 1988, while Laver is the only one who did the feat twice, in 1962 and 1969.

Three other singles players have won four consecutive major tournaments in a row, but not in a single year: Novak Djokovic, Martina Navratilova, and Serena Williams, with Williams having done so twice. Graf has a non-consecutive singles Grand Slam in addition to her calendar-year Grand Slam.

In doubles, only three teams have won the calendar-year Grand Slam. Ken McGregor and Frank Sedgman achieved the feat in men's doubles in 1951; Court and Ken Fletcher did so in mixed doubles in 1963, and Navratilova and Pam Shriver did so in women's doubles in 1984. One man and three women have individually won all four Grand Slam events in a year, but with different partners—Maria Bueno in women's doubles in 1960; Court in mixed doubles in 1965, Owen Davidson in mixed doubles in 1967, and Martina Hingis in women's doubles in 1998.

The non-calendar Grand Slam has been equally rare in doubles. The only men's team to win a non-calendar Grand Slam is the Bryan brothers, who did so in 2012–13. In women's doubles, Louise Brough won with two different partners in 1949–50; Navratilova won five consecutive Grand Slam events with two different partners in 1986–87, teaming with Shriver for the last four of these; Gigi Fernández and Natasha Zvereva won six consecutive Slam events in 1992–93; Zvereva herself won four consecutive Slam events with different partners in 1996–97; and the Williams sisters (Serena and Venus) achieved the feat in 2009–10. In mixed doubles, Billie Jean King teamed with Davidson for the last three events of his 1967 Grand Slam and completed the non-consecutive Grand Slam the next year with Dick Crealy.

== American collegiate sports ==
=== NAIA Football ===
In 1966 Waynesburg College went 11–0 after a 9–0 regular season record. In December 1966 Waynesburg defeated New Mexico Highlands in Albuquerque, New Mexico in the playoff game and defeated Whitewater Wisconsin in the NAIA Champion Bowl at Tulsa Oklahoma.

=== NCAA Football ===
Due to relatively short seasons through most of college football history, the list of undefeated Division I football teams includes dozens of teams. The highest level of college football, the Division I Football Bowl Subdivision (introduced as Division I-A in 1978), did not use a playoff to determine a champion prior to the introduction of the four-team College Football Playoff (CFP) in 2014, later expanded to 12 teams beginning in 2024. The system replaced by the CFP relied on a combination of polls and computer rankings to choose two teams to play one title game in a system known as the Bowl Championship Series. Prior to 1992, no official attempt was made to match up the top two teams in a championship game, further increasing the chances of multiple teams achieving a perfect season. The record for most wins in an undefeated FBS season is 16–0 accomplished in 2025 by Indiana. Following that the record is 15–0 accomplished in 2018 by Clemson, in 2019 by LSU, in 2022 by Georgia, and in 2023 by Michigan, and 14–0, accomplished in 2002 by Ohio State, twice in 2009 by Boise State and Alabama, in 2010 by Auburn, and in 2013 by Florida State.

The University of Washington's FBS record 64-game unbeaten streak (including ties) included five straight perfect seasons from 1909 to 1913. The University of Oklahoma's FBS record 47 game winning streak included three straight perfect seasons from 1954 to 1956.

Many teams had undefeated seasons in which they never allowed another team to score a point against them. The 1901–02 Michigan Wolverines football team outscored its opponents 550–0.

=== NCAA Division I Basketball ===
==== Men ====
Before the establishment of the National Invitation Tournament in 1938 and the NCAA Division I men's basketball tournament in 1939, perfect seasons were more common; each season consisted of fewer games and top teams from different parts of the country might never meet.

Eight teams have completed perfect seasons, including postseason tournament victories, since the tournament era began in 1938:

- 1939 LIU Blackbirds (24–0) — NIT champion, which at the time was more prestigious than the NCAA tournament
- 1956 San Francisco Dons (29–0) — NCAA champion
- 1957 North Carolina Tar Heels (32–0) — NCAA champion
- 1964 UCLA Bruins (30–0) — NCAA champion
- 1967 UCLA Bruins (30–0) — NCAA champion
- 1972 UCLA Bruins (30–0) — NCAA champion
- 1973 UCLA Bruins (30–0) — NCAA champion
- 1976 Indiana Hoosiers (32–0) — NCAA champion

In addition, four other teams in the tournament era had unbeaten records, but did not play in any postseason tournament:

- 1940 Seton Hall Pirates (19–0) — not invited to either the NCAA Tournament or NIT.
- 1944 Army Cadets (15–0) — not invited to either the NCAA Tournament or NIT. (Given that this season was during World War II, it is also possible that Army chose to turn down tournament invitations.)
- 1954 Kentucky Wildcats (25–0) — declined a bid to the NCAA Tournament due to an NCAA ruling that graduate students could not compete.
- 1973 NC State Wolfpack (27–0) — ineligible for postseason competition due to rule violations earlier that season.

The UCLA Bruins are the only team to have back-to-back perfect seasons (1971–1972, 1972–1973), and all four of the college's perfect seasons were under Hall of Fame head coach John Wooden. Additionally, under Wooden, UCLA had a record 88-game winning streak, from 1971 to 1974.

The following teams completed a perfect regular season, but lost in the NCAA tournament or other postseason action:

- 1939 Loyola Ramblers (finished regular season 20–0; lost in the NIT final to LIU and finish 21–1 overall.)
- 1941 Seton Hall Pirates (finished regular season 19–0; lost in the NIT semifinals to LIU and third-place game to CCNY and finish 20–2 overall.)
- 1951 Columbia Lions (finished regular season 20–0; lost in the first round to Illinois and finish 21–1 overall.)
- 1961 Ohio State Buckeyes (finished regular season 23–0; lost in the championship game to Cincinnati and finish 27–1 overall.)
- 1968 Houston Cougars (finished regular season 28–0; lost in the Final Four to eventual champion UCLA and in the consolation game to Ohio State and finish 31–2 overall.)
- 1968 St. Bonaventure Bonnies (finished regular season 22–0; lost in the Sweet Sixteen to North Carolina and in the consolation game to Columbia and finish 23–2 overall.)
- 1971 Penn Quakers (finished the regular season 26–0; lost in the Elite Eight to Villanova and finish 28–1 overall.)
- 1971 Marquette Warriors (finished regular season 26–0; lost in the Sweet Sixteen to Ohio State and finished 28–1 overall.)
- 1975 Indiana Hoosiers (finished regular season 29–0; lost in the Elite Eight to Kentucky and finished 31–1 overall.)
- 1976 Rutgers Scarlet Knights (entered the tournament 28–0; lost in the Final Four to Michigan and in the consolation game to UCLA and finished 31–2 overall.)
- 1979 Indiana State Sycamores (entered the tournament 29–0; but lost in the championship game to Michigan State and finished 33–1 overall.)
- 1979 Alcorn State Braves (entered the NIT tournament 27–0; lost in the second round of the NIT to eventual champion Indiana and finished 28–1 overall. (Note: The Braves were not invited to the NCAA tournament.))
- 1991 UNLV Runnin' Rebels (entered the tournament 30–0; lost in the Final Four to eventual champion Duke and finished 34–1 overall.)
- 2004 Saint Joseph's Hawks (finished regular season 27–0; lost to Xavier in the quarterfinals of the 2004 Atlantic 10 men's basketball tournament. They lost in the Elite Eight to Oklahoma State and finished 30–2 overall.)
- 2014 Wichita State Shockers (entered the tournament 34–0; lost to eventual runner-up Kentucky in the round of 32 and finished 35–1 overall.)
- 2015 Kentucky Wildcats (entered the tournament 34–0; lost in the Final Four to Wisconsin and finished 38–1 overall.)
- 2021 Gonzaga Bulldogs (entered the tournament 26–0; lost in the championship game to Baylor and finished 31–1 overall.)
- 2026 Miami RedHawks (finished regular season 31–0; lost to UMass in the quarterfinals of the 2026 MAC men's basketball tournament. They lost in the round of 64 to Tennessee and finished 32–2 overall.)

==== Women ====
In the women's game, the following national championship teams have had perfect records since the AIAW began sponsoring a championship tournament in 1972 (which was followed by the NCAA tournament in 1982):

- 1973 Immaculata Mighty Macs (20–0)
- 1975 Delta State Lady Statesmen (28–0)
- 1981 Louisiana Tech Lady Techsters (34–0)
- 1986 Texas Longhorns (34–0)
- 1995 UConn Huskies (35–0)
- 1998 Tennessee Lady Vols (39–0)
- 2002 UConn Huskies (39–0)
- 2009 UConn Huskies (39–0)
- 2010 UConn Huskies (39–0)
- 2012 Baylor Lady Bears (40–0)
- 2014 UConn Huskies (40–0)
- 2016 UConn Huskies (38–0)
- 2024 South Carolina Gamecocks (38–0)

The following teams completed perfect regular seasons, but lost in the NCAA tournament or other postseason action:

- The 1983 Oral Roberts Lady Titans (now nicknamed Golden Eagles) finished the regular season 24–0, but were not invited to the NCAA tournament. They played in the National Women's Invitational Tournament, losing to Memphis State (now known as Memphis) in the second round. After winning a consolation game against Weber State, they finished the season 26–1.
- The 1990 Louisiana Tech Lady Techsters entered the NCAA Tournament at 28–0, but lost in the Final Four to Auburn to finish 32–1.
- The Vermont Catamounts were unbeaten entering the NCAA Tournament in both 1992 (29–0) and 1993 (28–0). They lost in the first round to George Washington in 1992 and Rutgers in 1993.
- The 1997 UConn Huskies entered the NCAA Tournament at 30–0, but lost in the final of the Midwest Regional to eventual national champion Tennessee, finishing 33–1.
- The 1998 Liberty Lady Flames entered the NCAA Tournament 28–0, but were seeded No. 16 in the Mideast Region and matched against Tennessee, with the Lady Vols crushing the Lady Flames 102–58.
- The 2003 UConn Huskies finished the regular season at 29–0, but lost to Villanova in the final of the Big East tournament, ending their then-record winning streak at 70 games. The Huskies went on to win the NCAA tournament, finishing 37–1.
- The 2007 Duke Blue Devils finished the regular season at 29–0, but lost in the semifinals of the ACC tournament to North Carolina State. In the NCAA tournament, they lost in the semifinals of the Greensboro Regional to Rutgers to finish 32–2.
- The 2010 Nebraska Cornhuskers finished the regular season at 29–0, but lost in the semifinals of the Big 12 Tournament to Texas A&M. In the NCAA tournament, they lost in the semifinals of the Kansas City Regional to Kentucky to finish 32–2.
- The 2014 Notre Dame Fighting Irish entered the NCAA Tournament at 32–0 and lost in the championship game to UConn, finishing 37–1.
- The 2015 Princeton Tigers entered the NCAA Tournament at 30–0 and lost in the second round to Maryland to finish 31–1.
- The 2017 UConn Huskies entered the NCAA Tournament at 32–0 and lost in the national semifinals to Mississippi State, ending their most recent record winning streak at 111 games. The Huskies finished 36–1.
- The 2018 UConn Huskies entered the NCAA Tournament at 32–0 but lost to Notre Dame to finish 36–1.
- The 2026 UConn Huskies entered the NCAA Tournament at 34–0 but lost to South Carolina, ending a 54-game winning streak. The Huskies finished 38–1.

Notably, the 2015–16 season saw all three NCAA women's champions finish with unbeaten seasons. In Division II, Lubbock Christian went 34–0. In Division III, Thomas More went 33–0 for the second straight season.

=== NCAA Ice Hockey ===
Among schools in the top level of men's ice hockey, the 1969–70 Cornell Big Red went 29–0–0 in the University Division (the predecessor to today's Division I) en route to a national championship.

Since Cornell's 29–0–0 season in 1969–70, the closest Division I Men's Ice Hockey Team to having a perfect season was the 1992–93 Maine Black Bears, who finished that year at 42–1–2, including a national title game victory against Lake Superior State. Their only loss came on February 19, 1993, against Boston University, where they lost 7–6 in overtime, and their only ties were on October 24 against Providence, 3–3, and on January 15 against Clarkson, 4–4.

The last men's team to finish unbeaten and untied and be national champions was the 1983–84 Bemidji State Beavers (31–0–0), who were then competing in Division II, a level of competition that no longer conducts a championship.

The 1955–56 Clarkson Golden Knights were undefeated and untied (23–0–0), but skipped the NCAA tournament because as the team had seniors with four years of college play which was against NCAA tournament rules, although not regular season rules, at that time.

The 1967–68 Iona Gaels went 16–0–0 in their inaugural season as an independent in Division III, but did not participate in a national championship as none existed for Division III at that time.

The most recent unbeaten and untied season in NCAA ice hockey at the highest level was in 2012–13 when the Minnesota Golden Gophers became the first NCAA women's team ever to accomplish the feat (41–0–0).

=== ACHA Hockey ===
The 2007–08 University of Illinois Fighting Illini, a club team, are the only American Collegiate Hockey Association team to record a perfect season with a record of 38–0–0.

=== NAIA baseball ===
In 2025, the LSU Shreveport Pilots went 59–0 on their way to an NAIA championship, becoming the first recorded team at any level of college baseball to finish a season unbeaten. Their team earned run average was more than a run better than that of any other NAIA team; they also led the NAIA in fielding percentage, were second in runs per game, and were third in team batting average.

=== Stunt ===
In stunt, an all-female cheerleading discipline that emphasizes acrobatics, the California Baptist Lancers enter the first season of official NCAA championship competition in 2026–27 having never lost a competition since the team debuted in 2020–21, with an overall record of 140–0. According to the Mountain Pacific Sports Federation, which added stunt as an official sport in 2026–27 with Cal Baptist as a member, this is "the longest registered win streak in the history of collegiate athletics". Before 2026–27, championships were exclusively governed by the College Stunt Association, including the 2023–2026 period in which stunt was included in the NCAA Emerging Sports for Women program.

== Canadian collegiate sports ==
=== U Sports Canadian Football ===
==== 1975 University of Ottawa Gee-Gees ====
In 1975 the number-one-ranked University of Ottawa Gee-Gees had the first Canadian Interuniversity Sport (now U Sports) undefeated season. After completing their perfect regular season at 8–0, the Gees Gees won their first play-off defeating the number-two-ranked Toronto Varsity Blues 14–7. The Gees Gees then demolished the Windsor Lancers 45–6 to win the Yates Cup and the right to play for the national championship and the Vanier Cup. The undefeated season was completed on November 21, 1975, when the Gee Gees defeated the University of Calgary Dinos 14–9 at CNE Stadium in Toronto. That night the Gee Gees became the first undefeated team in CIS and Vanier Cup history. The 1975 Gees Gees roster had a big impact on the CFL. Gee Gee Players from the 1975 team played in the CFL for a cumulative total of 96 years and throughout their professional careers in the CFL accomplished: one Canadian Football Hall of Fame Inductee, one Grey Cup Canadian MVP, two Frank M. Gibson Trophies for Outstanding Rookie Eastern Division, two CFL Leo Dandurand Trophy Outstanding Lineman Eastern Division, twenty CFL and Divisional All-Star Selections, twenty-three Grey Cup Appearances and a total of twelve Grey Cup rings.

==== 2003, 2005 Saskatchewan Huskies ====
In 2003 and 2005, the Saskatchewan Huskies completed perfect regular seasons. However, in both years they lost in the playoffs: in the Vanier Cup to the Laurier Golden Hawks in 2005, and in the Canada West semi-final to Alberta Golden Bears in 2003.

==== 2007 Manitoba Bisons ====
A perfect season was attained in 2007 by the Manitoba Bisons, the football squad representing the University of Manitoba, in Winnipeg. The Bisons were undefeated in Canada West Universities Athletic Association play during the 8-game schedule. In the playoffs, Manitoba comfortably handled the Calgary Dinos 27–5 in the opening round. The Bisons followed up with a 48–5 defeat of the Regina Rams in the Hardy Trophy and a strong 52–20 showing against the perennial contenders from the University of Western Ontario, the Western Ontario Mustangs, in the Mitchell Bowl. On Friday, November 23, 2007, two days before the 95th Grey Cup game in Toronto, the Bisons defeated the Saint Mary's University squad, known as the Saint Mary's Huskies, 28–14 to claim their first Vanier Cup championship since 1970, and third overall title. That victory capped their perfect 12 win season.

==== 2010 Laval Rouge et Or ====
In 2010, the Laval Rouge et Or in Quebec City, had a perfect season of 13–0. They were undefeated with an 8–0 record in the QUFL. During the playoffs, they beat the Bishop's Gaiters 56–1 in the opening round. The Rouge et Or won the QUFL championship and the Dunsmore Cup by a close win of 22–17 against the Sherbrooke Vert et Or. They followed with a win of 13–11 against the Western Ontario Mustangs in the Uteck Bowl. Finally, on Saturday, November 27, 2010, in their home stadium in Quebec City, they won the Vanier Cup 29–2 against the Calgary Dinos, capping a 13–0 season.

=== U Sports Hockey ===
==== Men ====
The 1962–63 McMaster Marlins (16–0–0) of Hamilton, Ontario, were the first team to have their name etched on the University Cup and did so by winning all their games in the regular season and post season. The Marlins concluded the regular season atop the West Division of the Quebec-Ontario Athletics Association with 12 wins, no losses and no ties. In the two-game total-goal final to determine the QOAA champion, McMaster outscored Laval University 5–3 and 7–4. At the University Cup, McMaster edged St. Francis-Xavier 4–3 and the University of British Columbia 3–2.

The 1972–73 Toronto Varsity Blues (23–0–0) were the second men's hockey team in U Sports to win a national championship with no losses and no ties in the regular season and post season. The Varsity Blues won all 17 regular season games to place first in the Ontario University Athletics Association's East Division. In sudden-death OUAA playoff action, the U of T defeated the University of Waterloo 13–2 and the University of Western Ontario 8–1. The University of Toronto downed the University of Alberta 5–2 and 5–3 in the University Cup semifinal at Edmonton and shaded Saint Mary's University 3–2 in the University Cup final at Toronto.

The 2023–24 University of New Brunswick Reds (38–0–0) from Fredericton, New Brunswick swept the Atlantic University Sport (AUS) best-of-five semifinal series against Saint Mary's University and the AUS best-of-three championship final series against Université de Moncton after posting 30 victories in the AUS regular season. At the U Sports Championship, UNB blanked Brock University 4–0 in the quarter final, Toronto Metropolitan University 7–0 in the semifinal and Université du Québec à Trois-Rivières 4–0 in the championship final.

=== CCAA Hockey ===
==== Men ====
The 1975–76 St. Clair College Saints (26–0–0) of Windsor, Ontario were the first of two Canadian Colleges Athletic Association men's hockey teams to go unbeaten and untied in the regular season and post season en route to a national title. After winning all 20 regular season games to finish atop the Ontario Colleges Athletic Association's Western Division, St. Clair outscored Fanshawe 5–2 and 6–3 to win the division playoff series and advance to the conference championships where they topped Algonquin 8–2 and Humber 11–2. At the CCAA Hockey National Championships in Camrose, Alberta, St. Clair downed Cape Breton 10–4 in the semi-final and Selkirk 11–2 in the final.

The 1984–85 Northern Alberta Institute of Technology (NAIT) Ooks (33–0–0) of Edmonton won all 25 of their regular season games in the Alberta Colleges Athletic Conference prior to sweeping the Camrose Lutheran College Vikings in a best-of-three conference semifinal series and the Red Deer College Kings in a best-of-five conference final series. At the CCAA Hockey National Championships in Moose Jaw, Saskatchewan, NAIT outscored the Cariboo College Chiefs 8–2, the Seneca College Braves 5–2 and the Victoriaville College Vulkins 9–2 to hoist the CCAA Championship Bowl.

== See also ==
- Winless season, the opposite of a perfect season, where a team either fails to win any game or loses every game
- The Invincibles (football), name given to some teams who finish unbeaten
- Winning streak
