= 2013 Major League Lacrosse season =

2013 MLL season
- League: Major League Lacrosse
- Sport: Field lacrosse
- Duration: April 2013 – August 25, 2013
- Teams: 8
- TV partner: CBS Sports Network

2013
- Season MVP: Kevin Crowley
- Top scorer: Chris Bocklet

Steinfeld Cup
- Champions: Chesapeake Bayhawks
- Runners-up: Charlotte Hounds

MLL seasons
- ← 2012 season 2014 season →

The 2013 Major League Lacrosse season was the 13th season of the league. The season began on April 27, 2013 and concluded with the championship game on August 25, 2013.

== Milestones and events ==
=== Coaching changes ===
On June 10, 2013, the Boston Cannons fired head coach Steve Duffy after a 1-5 start and replaced him with John Tucker.

On June 24, 2013, the Ohio Machine fired head coach Ted Garber after a 1-7 start to the season and replaced him with Bear Davis.

=== Name changes ===
On December 14, 2012, the Long Island Lizards changed their name to the New York Lizards.

=== Neutral-location games ===
The league will host three games in neutral locations.

Date	Road Team	Home team	City	Stadium	Attendance
April 27	Chesapeake Bayhawks 17	Rochester Rattlers 14	St. Petersburg, Florida	Al Lang Stadium	3,940
June 7	Boston Cannons 14	Rochester Rattlers 16	Kennesaw, Georgia	Fifth Third Bank Stadium	4,417
June 22	Rochester Rattlers 11	Hamilton Nationals 17	Boca Raton, Florida	FAU Stadium	4,464

In addition, the New York Lizards will play two of its seven home games at Icahn Stadium.

=== Other ===
On April 22, 2013, MLL and YouTube agreed to an exclusive fifteen-game schedule.

On July 4, 2013, the Denver Outlaws broke the MLL attendance record for the eighth year in a row as 31,019 fans poured into Sports Authority Field at Mile High to watch the Outlaws defeat the New York Lizards, 16-7. Denver also became the first MLL team ever to start a season 10-0 with the win, and they carried this on the finish with the first perfect regular season in the thirteen years of the competition. Previously, in fact, no team had gone through an MLL regular season with only one loss, yet alone without losing. The most recent teams to lose two regular season games were the Outlaws and the Philadelphia Barrage in 2006.

The 2013 season marked the last season for the Hamilton Nationals. The dissolved Nationals team formed the basis of the Florida Launch for the 2014 season.

== Standings ==
Playoff Seed

Major League Lacrosse
	W	L	PCT	GB	GF	2ptGF	GA	2ptGA
Denver Outlaws	14	0	1.000	-	226	10	136	3
Chesapeake Bayhawks	9	5	.643	5	181	12	149	7
Hamilton Nationals	9	5	.643	5	170	10	168	10
Charlotte Hounds	7	7	.500	7	178	10	179	10
Rochester Rattlers	6	8	.400	8	152	9	171	12
Boston Cannons	5	9	.357	9	178	5	202	15
New York Lizards	4	10	.286	10	144	6	173	7
Ohio Machine	2	12	.143	12	130	3	181	6

Chesapeake and Hamilton split their two regular-season games. Chesapeake outscored Hamilton 28-22 in those two games to finish second.

== All Star Game ==
Team Supernova defeated Team Eclipse 24-15 in the 2013 MLL All-Star Game, presented by Moe's Southwest Grill from American Legion Memorial Stadium in Charlotte, N.C on Saturday July 13, 2013. Hamilton's Kevin Crowley was named the Most Valuable Player.

== Playoffs ==
August 24 and 25 PPL Park, in Chester, PA.

Semifinals
Denver Outlaws	14
Charlotte Hounds	17
Chesapeake Bayhawks	13
Hamilton Nationals	12

Steinfeld Cup Final
Chesapeake Bayhawks	10
Charlotte Hounds	9

== Annual awards ==
Award	Winner	Team
MVP Award	Kevin Crowley	Hamilton
Rookie of the Year Award	Rob Pannell	New York
Coach of the Year Award	Jim Stagnitta	Denver
Defensive player of the Year Award	Lee Zink	Denver
Offensive player of the Year Award	Kevin Crowley	Hamilton
Goaltender of the Year Award	Jesse Schwartzman	Denver
Most Improved Player of the Year Award	Drew Snider	Denver
