= 2013 Rochester Rattlers season =

2013 Rochester Rattlers
- League: Major League Lacrosse
- Coach: Tim Soudan
- Arena: Sahlen's Stadium

The 2013 Rochester Rattlers season is the 11th season for the Rochester Rattlers of Major League Lacrosse and third since the Chicago Machine rebranded themselves as the Rattlers after the original franchise relocated to Toronto. The Rattlers will try to improve upon their 7–7 record in 2012, which was enough to qualify for playoff.

Tim Soudan served as the team's head coach.

== Standings ==
Playoff Seed

Major League Lacrosse
| | W | L | PCT | GB | GF | 2ptGF | GA | 2ptGA |
|---|---|---|---|---|---|---|---|---|
| Denver Outlaws | 14 | 0 | 1.000 | - | 226 | 10 | 136 | 3 |
| Chesapeake Bayhawks | 9 | 5 | .643 | 5 | 181 | 12 | 149 | 7 |
| Hamilton Nationals | 9 | 5 | .643 | 5 | 170 | 10 | 168 | 10 |
| Charlotte Hounds | 7 | 7 | .500 | 7 | 178 | 10 | 179 | 10 |
| Rochester Rattlers | 6 | 8 | .400 | 8 | 152 | 9 | 171 | 12 |
| Boston Cannons | 5 | 9 | .357 | 9 | 178 | 5 | 202 | 15 |
| New York Lizards | 4 | 10 | .286 | 10 | 144 | 6 | 173 | 7 |
| Ohio Machine | 2 | 12 | .143 | 12 | 130 | 3 | 181 | 6 |
