= 2013 Ohio Machine season =

2013 Ohio Machine
- League: Major League Lacrosse
- General Manager: John Algie
- Coach: Bear Davis
- Arena: Selby Field

The 2013 Ohio Machine season is the second season for the Ohio Machine of Major League Lacrosse. The Machine will try to improve upon their inaugural season in 2011, where they finished a league-worst 2–12.

== Standings ==
Playoff Seed

Major League Lacrosse
| | W | L | PCT | GB | GF | 2ptGF | GA | 2ptGA |
|---|---|---|---|---|---|---|---|---|
| Denver Outlaws | 14 | 0 | 1.000 | - | 226 | 10 | 136 | 3 |
| Chesapeake Bayhawks | 9 | 5 | .643 | 5 | 181 | 12 | 149 | 7 |
| Hamilton Nationals | 9 | 5 | .643 | 5 | 170 | 10 | 168 | 10 |
| Charlotte Hounds | 7 | 7 | .500 | 7 | 178 | 10 | 179 | 10 |
| Rochester Rattlers | 6 | 8 | .400 | 8 | 152 | 9 | 171 | 12 |
| Boston Cannons | 5 | 9 | .357 | 9 | 178 | 5 | 202 | 15 |
| New York Lizards | 4 | 10 | .286 | 10 | 144 | 6 | 173 | 7 |
| Ohio Machine | 2 | 12 | .143 | 12 | 130 | 3 | 181 | 6 |
