= 2013 Hamilton Nationals season =

2013 Hamilton Nationals
- League: Major League Lacrosse
- 2013 record: 9-5
- Goals for: 170
- Goals against: 168
- General Manager: Jody Gage
- Coach: Regy Thorpe
- Arena: Ron Joyce Stadium

The 2013 Hamilton Nationals season is the fifth and final season for the Hamilton Nationals of Major League Lacrosse, and third since relocating from Toronto. They improved upon their 2012 season in which they finished with a record of 4-10. But lost to the Bayhawks in the semifinals

== Standings ==
Playoff Seed

Major League Lacrosse
	W	L	PCT	GB	GF	2ptGF	GA	2ptGA
Denver Outlaws	14	0	1.000	-	226	10	136	3
Chesapeake Bayhawks	9	5	.643	5	181	12	149	7
Hamilton Nationals	9	5	.643	5	170	10	168	10
Charlotte Hounds	7	7	.500	7	178	10	179	10
Rochester Rattlers	6	8	.400	8	152	9	171	12
Boston Cannons	5	9	.357	9	178	5	202	15
New York Lizards	4	10	.286	10	144	6	173	7
Ohio Machine	2	12	.143	12	130	3	181	6
