= 2013 New York Lizards season =

2013 New York Lizards
- League: Major League Lacrosse
- General Manager: Casey Hilpert
- Coach: Jim Mule
- Arena: James M. Shuart Stadium

The New York Lizards are a Major League Lacrosse (MLL) professional men's field lacrosse team based in Hempstead, New York, United States, located on Long Island. After the 2012 season the team changed its name from the Long Island Lizards to the New York Lizards. The team will play two of its seven home games in the 2013 season in Icahn Stadium on Randall's Island in New York City. The rest of the home games will be in Hempstead, NY on Long Island.

== Current depth chart* ==
After the first two games of the season, 11 of the 18 players that recorded a statistic in those games were returning players from the 2012 Lizards team.

Name	Age	2012 Lizards?	College	All-American awards in college*/note
ATTACK
Rob Pannel			Cornell '12	
Steve Mock			Cornell '13	
Vito DeMola	24	No	Dowling '12	'12 (honorable mention)
Matt Gibson	23	Yes	Yale '12	'10 (honorable mention), '11 (honorable mention)
Mark Matthews	23	No	Denver '12	'11 (2nd team), '12 (2nd team)
Tommy Palasek	23	Yes	Syracuse '12	
MIDFIELDERS
Jojo Marasco			Syracuse '13	
Stephen Peyser	28	Yes	Johns Hopkins '08	'07 (3rd team), '08 (2nd team); 2010 US nat'l team
Max Seibald			Cornell	
Justin Smith	30	Yes	Salisbury '05	'04 (2nd team), '05 (1st team)
Mike Unterstein	27	No	Hofstra '08	
Kevin Unterstein	27	No	Hofstra '08	'07 (honorable mention)
FACE OFF
Greg Gurenlian	29	Yes	Penn State '06	
DEFENSE
Matt Bernier	25	No	Penn State '11	
Dan Cocchi	32	Yes	Towson '03	'01 (2nd team), '02 (honorable mention), '03 (honorable mention)
CJ Costabile	23	Yes	Duke '12	'09 (honorable mention), '10 (3rd team), '11 (3rd team), '12 (1st team)
Brian Karalunas	24	Yes	Villanova '11	'09 (honorable mention), '10 (honorable mention), '11 (1st team)
Jack Reid	29	No	UMass '06	'04 (honorable mention), '05 (2nd team), '06 (1st team)
Michael Skudin	24	Yes	Hofstra	'11 (honorable mention)
Steven Waldeck	25	No	Stony Brook '10	'10 (honorable mention)
GOALKEEPER
Drew Adams	27	Yes	Penn State '09	'06 (honorable mention), '08 (honorable mention), '09 (honorable mention)

^{*} Tables above include players with statistics in the first two games of the 2013. season All-American awards tabulated by LaxPower

== On 2013 roster, no stats ==
Max Seibald (26 years old, Cornell '09) was on the 2013 Lizards injured reserve roster as of 20 May 2013 and had not appeared in a game in the 2013 season as of that date. Seibald was a four-time All-American (2006–2009), on the 1st team three times and on the 2nd team in his freshman year at Cornell. He was Player of the Year in Division I men's lacrosse in 2009. He played with Rob Pannell in the 2009 college season at Cornell. Cornell made it to the final of the Division I men's lacrosse tournament that year before losing to Syracuse 9-10. He played in 10 games in the 2009 season for Denver in the MLL after playing in the NCAA tournament. His first year with the Lizards was in 2012. Seibald was on the US men's national lacrosse team in 2010.

== Recent draftees ==
=== January 2012 MLL draft* ===
Pick #	Name	College	Note
#1	Rob Pannell	Cornell	In last year of college eligibility at Cornell; playing in NCAA Division I playoffs; Tewaaraton award finalist
#18	Sam Bradman	Salisbury	Signed with LXM Pro Tour in California; DIII player of year in 2012
#28	Tommy Palasek	Syracuse	Leading NY Lizards in points after two games in 2013
#36	Kyle Moeller	Stony Brook	Did not suit up in 2012 season for the NY Lizards; selected by Charlotte in supplemental draft in Dec. 2012
#52	Charlie Streep	Bucknell	Spent fifth year of eligibility @ UVA in 2013, finished college season, graduated, not on 2013 Lizards roster
#60	Robert Campbell	Stony Brook	Not on 2013 NY Lizards roster

^{*} Eligible players for January 2012 draft were college players set to maximize college playing eligibility that year as of the time of the draft (January 2012)

=== Supplemental draft (12/11/12)* ===
Pick #	Name	Note
#5	Kevin Ridgway	
#21	Andrew Hennessey	
#37	Matt Cannone	On 2013 NY Lizards roster
#45	Justin Smith	On 2013 NY Lizards roster
#53	Parker McKee	
#55	Matt Bernier	On 2013 NY Lizards roster
#61	Chris Langton	
#69	Joey Kemp	
#77	Doug Shannahan	On 2013 NY Lizards roster
#85	Joe Yevoli	
#93	David Hild	On 2013 NY Lizards roster

^{*}

=== January 2013 MLL draft ===
Pick #	Name	College	Note
#37	JoJo Marasco	Syracuse	Currently in NCAA Division I playoffs
#47	John Antoniades	Hofstra	Finished college season, on 2013 NY Lizards roster
#53	Steve Murphy	Notre Dame	Currently in NCAA Division I playoffs
#56	Mark Mullen	Hofstra	Finished college season, on 2013 NY Lizards roster
#61	Jeffrey Tundo	Stony Brook	Finished college season, on 2013 NY Lizards roster

^{*} Eligible players for January 2012 draft were college players set to maximize college playing eligibility that year as of the time of the draft (January 2012)

== Schedule ==
Date	Time	Away team	Home team	Lizards win/loss, score
Sunday, April 28	3:30 PM EST	Boston Cannons	@New York Lizards	W, 14-11
Saturday, May 4	7:00 PM EST	New York Lizards	@Chesapeake Bayhawks	L, 3-14
Saturday, May 11	7:00 PM EST	New York Lizards	@Hamilton Nationals	L, 11-12
Saturday, May 18	8:00 PM EST	New York Lizards	@Ohio Machine	W, 14-8
Friday, May 31	7:30 PM EST	Charlotte Hounds	@New York Lizards (Hempstead, NY)	L, 12-14
Thursday, June 6	7:00 PM EST	Chesapeake Bayhawks	@New York Lizards (Icahn Stadium, NYC)	L, 8-21
Thursday, June 13	7:00 PM EST	Hamilton Nationals	@New York Lizards (Icahn Stadium, NYC)	W, 12-10
Saturday, June 22	7:00 PM EST	New York Lizards	@Boston Cannons	L, 12-16
Sunday, June 30	3:00 PM EST	New York Lizards	@Rochester Rattlers	L, 10-13
Thursday, July 4	9:00 PM EST	New York Lizards	@Denver Outlaws	L, 7-16
Saturday, July 20	4:00 PM EST	New York Lizards	@Charlotte Hounds	
Saturday, July 27	7:00 PM EST	Rochester Rattlers	@New York Lizards (Hempstead, NY)	
Sunday, August 4	3:30 PM EST	Denver Outlaws	@New York Lizards (Hempstead, NY)	
Saturday, August 10	7:00 PM EST	Ohio Machine	@New York Lizards (Hempstead, NY)	

== Standings ==
Playoff Seed

Major League Lacrosse
	W	L	PCT	GB	GF	2ptGF	GA	2ptGA
Denver Outlaws	14	0	1.000	-	226	10	136	3
Chesapeake Bayhawks	9	5	.643	5	181	12	149	7
Hamilton Nationals	9	5	.643	5	170	10	168	10
Charlotte Hounds	7	7	.500	7	178	10	179	10
Rochester Rattlers	6	8	.400	8	152	9	171	12
Boston Cannons	5	9	.357	9	178	5	202	15
New York Lizards	4	10	.286	10	144	6	173	7
Ohio Machine	2	12	.143	12	130	3	181	6
