= 2010 Toronto Nationals season =

2010 Hamilton Nationals season
- Head coach: David Huntley
- Home stadium: Lamport Stadium

Results
- Record: 3-9
- Division place: 6th MLL
- Playoffs: Did not qualify

The 2010 Toronto Nationals season was the second for the franchise. After playing their 2009 season at BMO Field, the Nationals moved their home games to Lamport Stadium for their second season. Coming off a Steinfeld Cup victory in 2009, the Nationals were unable to repeat this achievement. They finished last in the league in 2010 and failed to qualify for the playoffs with a 3-9 record. Brodie Merrill won the Major League Lacrosse Defensive player of the Year Award and was named to the All-MLL team as a defenseman.

== Standings ==
W = Wins, L = Losses, PCT = Winning Percentage, GB = Games Back of first place, GF = Goals For, 2ptGF = 2 point Goals For, GA = Goals Against, 2ptGA = 2 point Goals Against

Qualified for playoffs

Team	W	L	PCT	GB	GF	2ptGF	GA	2ptGA
Boston Cannons	8	4	.667	-	174	15	141	10
Denver Outlaws	8	4	.667	-	158	9	148	10
Long Island Lizards	7	5	.583	1	141	9	139	12
Chesapeake Bayhawks	6	6	.500	2	161	18	158	8
Chicago Machine	4	8	.333	4	157	4	171	11
Toronto Nationals	3	9	.250	5	132	8	166	12

Boston finished ahead of Denver based on a head to head record of 3-0.

== Schedule ==
Week	Date	Opponent	Field	Result	Attendance	Record
1	May 16	@ Machine	WakeMed Soccer Park	16-9	2,011	0-1
2	May 22	Bayhawks	Lamport Stadium	25-12	3,921	0-2
3	May 29	@ Outlaws	Invesco Field at Mile High	15-12	6,123	0-3
4	June 5	Machine	Lamport Stadium	14-13	2,100	0-4
5	June 12	Bayhawks	Lamport Stadium	10-9	2,145	0-5
6	June 19	@ Lizards	James M. Shuart Stadium	11-9	3,076	1-5
7	June 24	@ Bayhawks	Navy–Marine Corps Memorial Stadium	17-14	3,588	2-5
8	July 1	Cannons	Lamport Stadium	15-13	2,963	3-5
9	July 10	Outlaws	Lamport Stadium	15-14 (OT)	2,834	3-6
11	July 24	@ Cannons	Harvard Stadium	18-10	7,477	3-7
12	July 31	@ Lizards	James M. Shuart Stadium	16-11	3,803	3-8
13	August 7	Lizards	Lamport Stadium	13-7	4,516	3-9

== Playoffs ==
The Nationals did not qualify for the 2010 Steinfeld Cup playoffs after winning the championship in 2009.
