= Joe Walters =

American lacrosse player (born 1984)

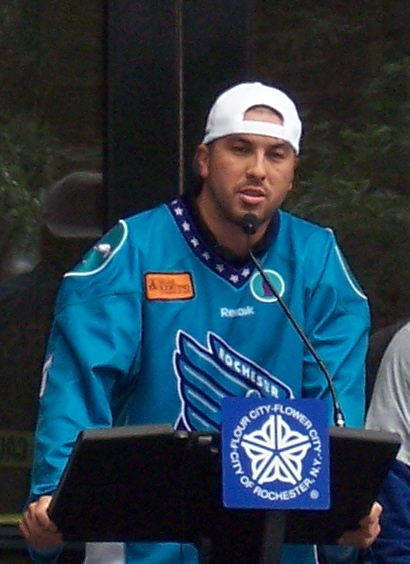
- Walters with the Rochester Knighthawks in 2012

Personal information
- Nationality: American
- Born: November 30, 1984 (age 41) Irondequoit, New York, U.S.
- Height: 6 ft 0 in (183 cm)
- Weight: 192 lb (87 kg; 13 st 10 lb)
- Website: sharpshooterlacrosse.com

Sport
- Position: Attack/Midfield
- Shoots: Left
- NCAA team: Maryland (2006)
- NLL draft: 18th overall, 2006; Buffalo Bandits
- NLL teams: Rochester Knighthawks; San Diego Seals
- MLL draft: 1st overall, 2006; Rochester Rattlers
- MLL teams: Rochester Rattlers; Toronto/Hamilton Nationals; Chesapeake Bayhawks; New York Lizards
- PLL teams: California Redwoods
- MSL team: Brampton Excelsiors
- Pro career: 2006–2021
Medal record
Representing United States
World Lacrosse Championship
Runner-up	2006 London
World Indoor Lacrosse Championship
Third place	2015 Onondaga

Joe Walters (born November 30, 1984) is an American former professional lacrosse player.

Walters is part of the 2022 class of the Rochester Lacrosse Hall of Fame.

== Early life ==
Walters, the youngest of four children was born to Joe and Be Walters. His father, Joe, served with the U.S. Army in the Vietnam War. Walter's father met Be in Vietnam. Walters attended Irondequoit High School in his hometown of Irondequoit, New York.

== College career ==
Walters was a four-time All-American at the University of Maryland. He won the ACC Rookie of the Year Award in 2003, and was named ACC Player of the Year in 2004. In the last game of his senior regular season with the Terps, Walters became the University of Maryland's all-time leading point scorer with 227 and all-time leading goal scorer with 153. Walters won the 2006 Jack Turnbull Award as the Attackman of the Year. He was also a finalist for the Tewaaraton Trophy, given to the National Player of the Year. Walters played in the 2006 World Lacrosse Championship for Team USA in July 2006. Up to that point, he was the only current college lacrosse player who made Team USA. Since then, Duke's Ned Crotty and Brennan O’Neill have also played for Team USA.

=== Career highlights ===
Goals: 6 vs. Virginia (2004-04-25), vs. UMBC (2005-03-19), at Johns Hopkins (2006-04-15)
Assists:5 vs. Denver (2006-05-13)
Points: 8 at Johns Hopkins (2006-04-15)
Groundballs: 6 vs. Bucknell (2004-03-17)
Multi-Goal Games: 41
Multi-Point Games: 52
Hat Tricks: 32
Point Scoring Streak: 45 games (2004-04-28 to 2006-04-30)
Goal Scoring Streak: 27 games (2004-02-28 to 2005-04-29)

== Professional career ==
=== Major League Lacrosse ===
Walters was taken 1st overall in the 2006 Major League Lacrosse Collegiate Draft by the Rochester Rattlers. During the 2007 season, Walters began playing the midfield position for the Rattlers, as opposed to his usual attack position. Walters was a member of consecutive Steinfeld Cup winning teams with the 2008 Rochester Rattlers and the 2009 Toronto Nationals. He was named Most Valuable Player of the 2008 MLL Championship Weekend. With the suspension of operations of the Hamilton Nationals after the 2013 season and the birth of the expansion Florida Launch for the 2014 season, most of the Nationals players, including Walters, were transferred to the Launch. This eliminated the need for MLL to conduct both a dispersal draft and an expansion draft. Before playing a game for the Launch, Walter was traded along with the 21st overall selection in the 2014 MLL collegiate draft to the Chesapeake Bayhawks in exchange for Casey Powell, the 10th selection in the 2014 MLL collegiate draft and the eighth pick in the 2014 MLL supplemental draft. On November 23, 2016, Joe engaged in the new MLL Player Movement Policy and signed with the New York Lizards.

=== National Lacrosse League ===
Walters was drafted into the National Lacrosse League by the Buffalo Bandits in the second round of the 2007 Draft. Walters did not play for the Bandits in 2007. Later, Walters was traded to the Philadelphia Wings, but never joined the team. Walters played his first season in the NLL with the Rochester Knighthawks in 2009. Walters was a member of the 2012, 2013 and 2014 Champion's Cup winning teams with the Knighthawks.

=== Canadian Lacrosse Association ===
Walters was a member of the 2011 Mann Cup champion Brampton Excelsiors.

=== Premier Lacrosse League ===
In 2019, Walters was announced as a member of Redwoods Lacrosse Club in Paul Rabil’s new Premier Lacrosse League.

Walters announced his retirement in March of 2022.

== Personal ==
Walters is of Vietnamese descent from his mother, who was born in Vietnam.

== Statistics ==
=== NCAA ===
Season	Team	GP	G	A	Pts	PPG
2003	University of Maryland	16	33	13	46	2.88
2004	University of Maryland	16	46	22	68	4.25
2005	University of Maryland	17	38	15	53	3.12
2006	University of Maryland	17	36	24	60	3.53
Totals		66	153	74	227	3.44

=== Major League Lacrosse ===
Season	Team	Regular season											Playoffs										
Season	Team	GP	G	2PG	A	Pts	Sh	GB	Pen	PIM	FOW	FOA	GP	G	2PG	A	Pts	Sh	GB	Pen	PIM	FOW	FOA
2006	Rochester Rattlers	9	12	1	8	21	54	15	4	7.5	0	0	–	–	–	–	–	–	–	–	–	–	–
2007	Rochester Rattlers	12	29	2	12	43	87	10	2	2	0	0	1	1	0	1	2	5	4	0	0	0	0
2008	Rochester Rattlers	12	32	0	12	44	96	10	2	2	0	0	2	6	0	5	11	19	3	0	0	0	0
2009	Toronto Nationals	12	23	2	17	42	89	10	2	1.5	0	0	2	3	0	2	5	15	0	0	0	0	0
2011	Hamilton Nationals	12	18	1	20	39	76	13	4	3	0	0	2	2	0	1	3	8	3	1	1	0	0
2012	Hamilton Nationals	11	17	1	28	46	71	10	2	1.5	0	0	–	–	–	–	–	–	–	–	–	–	–
2013	Hamilton Nationals	12	22	0	26	48	70	10	2	1.5	0	0	1	2	0	3	5	8	0	0	0	0	0
2014	Chesapeake Bayhawks	9	15	0	24	39	58	6	2	1.5	0	0	–	–	–	–	–	–	–	–	–	–	–
2015	Chesapeake Bayhawks	8	19	0	18	37	66	11	0	0.5	0	0	–	–	–	–	–	–	–	–	–	–	–
2016	Chesapeake Bayhawks	12	23	0	27	50	68	15	0	2	0	0	–	–	–	–	–	–	–	–	–	–	–
2017	New York Lizards	14	23	1	18	42	71	8	0	0	0	0	–	–	–	–	–	–	–	–	–	–	–
2018	New York Lizards	14	27	0	25	52	80	13	0	2.5	0	0	1	0	0	1	1	2	2	0	0	0	0
		137	260	8	235	503	886	131	20	25.5	0	0	9	14	0	13	27	57	12	1	1	0	0
Career total:		146	274	8	248	530	943	143	21	26.5	0	0											

GP–Games played; G–Goals; 2PG–2-point goals; A–Assists; Pts–Points; Sh–Shots; GB–Ground balls; Pen–Penalties; PIM–Penalty minutes; FOW–Faceoffs won; FOA–Faceoffs attempted

=== Premier Lacrosse League ===
Season	Team	Regular season											Playoffs										
Season	Team	GP	G	2PG	A	Pts	Sh	GB	Pen	PIM	FOW	FOA	GP	G	2PG	A	Pts	Sh	GB	Pen	PIM	FOW	FOA
2019	Redwoods	10	9	0	11	20	42	5	0	0	0	0	3	3	0	2	5	5	1	0	0	0	0
2020	Redwoods	6	3	1	5	9	13	1	1	1	0	0	–	–	–	–	–	–	–	–	–	–	–
2021	Redwoods	–	–	–	–	–	–	–	–	–	–	–	1	0	0	1	1	0	1	0	0	0	0
		16	12	1	16	29	55	6	1	1	0	0	4	3	0	3	6	5	2	0	0	0	0
Career total:		20	15	1	19	35	60	8	1	1	0	0											

GP–Games played; G–Goals; 2PG–2-point goals; A–Assists; Pts–Points; Sh–Shots; GB–Ground balls; Pen–Penalties; PIM–Penalty minutes; FOW–Faceoffs won; FOA–Faceoffs attempted

=== National Lacrosse League ===
Joe Walters		Regular season									Playoffs								
Season	Team	GP	G	A	Pts	LB	PIM	Pts/GP	LB/GP	PIM/GP	GP	G	A	Pts	LB	PIM	Pts/GP	LB/GP	PIM/GP
2009	Rochester Knighthawks	15	8	12	20	50	9	1.33	3.33	0.60	1	0	0	0	1	0	0.00	1.00	0.00
2010	Rochester Knighthawks	14	1	10	11	39	4	0.79	2.79	0.29	–	–	–	–	–	–	–	–	–
2011	Rochester Knighthawks	5	1	10	11	12	0	2.20	2.40	0.00	–	–	–	–	–	–	–	–	–
2012	Rochester Knighthawks	6	3	13	16	9	0	2.67	1.50	0.00	3	4	9	13	3	0	4.33	1.00	0.00
2013	Rochester Knighthawks	15	9	25	34	22	7	2.27	1.47	0.47	3	3	9	12	6	2	4.00	2.00	0.67
2014	Rochester Knighthawks	16	15	26	41	29	15	2.56	1.81	0.94	6	4	14	18	8	0	3.00	1.33	0.00
2015	Rochester Knighthawks	17	20	33	53	35	4	3.12	2.06	0.24	3	1	5	6	4	2	2.00	1.33	0.67
2016	Rochester Knighthawks	15	16	31	47	43	4	3.13	2.87	0.27	–	–	–	–	–	–	–	–	–
2019	San Diego Seals	2	2	1	3	3	0	1.50	1.50	0.00	1	0	0	0	1	0	0.00	1.00	0.00
		105	75	161	236	242	43	2.25	2.30	0.41	17	12	37	49	23	4	2.88	1.35	0.24
Career Total:		122	87	198	285	265	47	2.34	2.17	0.39									

GP–Games played; G–Goals; A–Assists; Pts–Points; LB–Loose balls; PIM–Penalty minutes; Pts/GP–Points per games played; LB/GP–Loose balls per games played; PIM/GP–Penalty minutes per games played.

=== Canadian Lacrosse Association ===
Joe Walters - Senior "A"			Regular Season							Playoffs						
Season	Team	League	GP	G	A	Pts	PIM	Pts/GP	PIM/GP	GP	G	A	Pts	PIM	Pts/GP	PIM/GP
2011	Brampton Excelsiors	MSL	6	5	14	19	2	3.17	0.33	17	7	29	36	4	2.12	0.24
2012	Brampton Excelsiors	MSL	8	8	20	28	0	3.50	0.00	9	6	21	27	0	3.00	0.00
2013	Brampton Excelsiors	MSL	1	0	0	0	0	0.00	0.00	–	–	–	–	–	–	–
			15	13	34	47	2	3.13	0.13	26	13	50	63	4	2.42	0.15
Senior "A" Career Total:			41	26	84	110	6	2.68	0.15							

GP–Games played; G–Goals; A–Assists; Pts–Points; PIM–Penalty minutes; Pts/GP–Points per game; PIM/GP–Penalty minutes per game

== Awards ==
Preceded by Matt Danowski	Jack Turnbull Award; 2006	Succeeded by Matt Danowski
Preceded by Matt Striebel	Steinfeld Cup Game MVP; 2008	Succeeded by Merrick Thomson
