= 2013 Boston Cannons season =

2013 Boston Cannons
- League: Major League Lacrosse
- General Manager: Kevin Barney
- Coach: John Tucker
- Arena: Harvard Stadium

The 2013 Boston Cannons season was the 13th season for the Boston Cannons of Major League Lacrosse. The Cannons tried to build on their 9–5 playoff season in 2012 after winning their first Steinfeld Cup in 2011.

== Standings ==
Playoff Seed

Major League Lacrosse
	W	L	PCT	GB	GF	2ptGF	GA	2ptGA
Denver Outlaws	14	0	1.000	-	226	10	136	3
Chesapeake Bayhawks	9	5	.643	5	181	12	149	7
Hamilton Nationals	9	5	.643	5	170	10	168	10
Charlotte Hounds	7	7	.500	7	178	10	179	10
Rochester Rattlers	6	8	.400	8	152	9	171	12
Boston Cannons	5	9	.357	9	178	5	202	15
New York Lizards	4	10	.286	10	144	6	173	7
Ohio Machine	2	12	.143	12	130	3	181	6
