= Merrick Thomson =

Canadian lacrosse player

Personal information
- Nationality: Canadian
- Born: September 9, 1983 (age 42) Hamilton, Ontario
- Height: 6 ft 2 in (188 cm)
- Weight: 210 lb (95 kg; 15 st 0 lb)

Sport
- Position: Attack / Forward
- Shoots: Left
- NLL draft: 2nd overall, 2007; Philadelphia Wings
- NLL teams: Philadelphia Wings
- MLL teams: Hamilton Nationals; New Jersey Pride
- Former NCAA team: University at Albany
- Pro career: 2007–2009

Merrick Thomson (born September 9, 1983) is a former professional lacrosse player from Hamilton, Ontario. He played the attack position for the Hamilton Nationals of Major League Lacrosse and for the Philadelphia Wings of the National Lacrosse League.

== College career ==
Thomson played collegiate lacrosse at the University at Albany. He was co-captain of the Great Danes, alongside Frank Resetarits, and helped lead his team to the NCAA Men's Lacrosse Championship tournament as a senior. Thomson made an immediate impact in the NCAA. As a freshman, he equaled the NCAA single game record of playoff goals scored, with six, in a contest against the Syracuse Orangemen, earning America East Conference Rookie of the Year in 2004. In 2005, he led the nation in goals scored per game, with 3.38 per game, and in 2007 was named an All-American (third-team).

== Professional career ==
=== MLL ===
Thomson played in Major League Lacrosse with the New Jersey Pride. In limited playing time as a rookie, Thomson impressed, and has proved himself a valuable asset in the future to the Pride. In 2008, his second season in the league, Thomson scored 42 goals (finishing with the second most on the season) and was awarded the Warrior Most Improved Player award. During the 2009 MLL season Thomson played for the Toronto Nationals. Thomson had a career high in goals with 44. He then helped lead Toronto to the MLL Championship and won the MVP award for the playoffs.

=== NLL ===
Thomson was selected in the first round (second overall) by the Philadelphia Wings of the National Lacrosse League in the 2007 NLL Entry Draft. A consensus first round draft pick, the Wings chose Thomson to strengthen their left-handed offensive attack. Thomson captured Rookie of the Week honors in week 4 of the 2008 NLL season, and also was named Rookie of the Month for January. In two seasons in Philadelphia, Thomson picked up 124 points.

=== Retirement ===
Thompson suffered a concussion during the 2009 MLL championship game. The injury sidelined Thomson for the entire 2010 NLL season with the Wings. He was also placed on Injury Reserve for the 2010 MLL season with the Nationals. In April 2011, Thomson announced that he would not return to professional lacrosse, due to post-concussion symptoms.

== Awards ==
- 2004 – America East Conference Rookie of the Year
- 2007 USILA Division I All-American
- 2008 Major League Lacrosse Most Improved Player of the Year Award

== Statistics ==
=== NCAA (Division I) ===
Season	Team	GP	G	A	Pts	GB
2004	UAlbany	16	47	12	59	23
2005	UAlbany	16	54	20	74	22
2006	UAlbany	15	31	11	42	27
2007	UAlbany	18	56	13	69	23
NCAA Totals		65	188(a)	56	244	95

^{(a)} 5th on NCAA career goals list

=== Major League Lacrosse ===
		Regular Season							Playoffs
Season	Team	GP	G	2ptG	A	Pts	GB	PIM	GP	G	2ptG	A	Pts	GB	PIM
2007	New Jersey	5	9	0	1	10	5	0	-	-	-	-	-	-	-
2008	New Jersey	12	42	0	10	52	10	2	-	-	-	-	-	-	-
2009	Toronto	11	44	0	6	50	13	1.5	2	6	0	0	6	5	1
MLL Totals		28	95	0	17	112	28	3.5	2	6	0	0	6	5	1

=== National Lacrosse League ===
		Regular Season						Playoffs
Season	Team	GP	G	A	Pts	LB	PIM	GP	G	A	Pts	LB	PIM
2008	Philadelphia	15	26	29	55	59	26	1	1	3	4	7	0
2009	Philadelphia	15	39	30	69	70	2	--	--	--	--	--	--
NLL totals		30	65	59	124	129	28	1	1	3	4	7	0
