= Hamilton Nationals =

Defunct Major League Lacrosse team

- Founded: 2009
- Folded: 2013
- League: MLL
- Based in: Hamilton, Ontario
- Stadium: Ron Joyce Stadium (2011-2013); Lamport Stadium (2010); BMO Field (2009)
- Colours: Black, orange, white, purple
- Owner: Arrow Express Sports
- Head coach: Dave Huntley
- General manager: Stuart Brown
- Championships: 1 (2009)
- Formerly: Toronto Nationals; 2009–2010; Hamilton Nationals; 2011–2013
- Website: nationalslacrosse.com

The Hamilton Nationals were a Major League Lacrosse (MLL) professional men's field lacrosse team based in Hamilton, Ontario, Canada. They began play in the 2009 season in Toronto, Ontario as the Toronto Nationals, becoming the first-ever Canadian MLL team. In 2009, they played their home games at BMO Field, which is also home to Major League Soccer's Toronto FC but moved to the smaller Lamport Stadium for the 2010 season. On February 3, 2011, the Nationals announced that they were relocating to Hamilton, Ontario, and would play their home games at Ron Joyce Stadium on the campus of McMaster University. On 21 November 2013, MLL announced that the team would not participate in the 2014 season, with most of the players being transferred to the expansion Florida Launch.

The Hamilton Nationals' identity represented both the Canadian and Haudenosaunee communities. The team's logo incorporated the Canadian maple leaf and the Haudenosaunee Hiwatha Belt pattern taken from each respective flag. Additionally, they continuously signed Haudenosaunee players.

== Franchise history ==
The Nationals had their roots in the MLL's charter franchise the Rochester Rattlers. Before the 2009 season, part of the Rattlers' roster was transferred to the new Nationals' team; however, the name, colors, and history stayed behind in Rochester to be potentially used by a future MLL team. In November 2010, it was reported that the Chicago Machine had moved to Rochester, NY and resumed operation of the Rattlers franchise.

The Nationals started play in the MLL on May 15, 2009 and won against Washington Bayhawks 17–16. They won their first home game over the Chicago Machine 15–11. The Nationals qualified for the playoffs as the second seed with a 7–5 record and the best offense in MLL with 184 goals for. The Nationals played their first playoff game against the Long Island Lizards at Navy–Marine Corps Memorial Stadium in Annapolis, Maryland. Toronto won their semi-final matchup 14–13 thanks to a strong game by Merrick Thomson scoring 4 goals. Toronto (at the time) went on to face the Denver Outlaws in the Steinfeld Cup Final. The Nationals were tied with the Outlaws 9–9 with over a minute to go in the game. Nationals head coach Dave Huntley called a time-out to draw out a strategy. With 45 seconds left to go, Joe Walters passed to Shawn Williams and Williams scored the winning goal to give the Toronto Nationals their first championship victory 10–9 over the Denver Outlaws. Merrick Thomson was named Playoff MVP and Brodie Merrill won the Major League Lacrosse Defensive player of the Year Award. In 2009 their home field was BMO Field and for 2010 at Lamport Stadium.

On February 3, 2011, the Nationals announced that they would be moving to Hamilton and would be known as the Hamilton Nationals. It was also announced that Arrow Express Sports would take sole ownership of the team and the team would play their home games at Ron Joyce Stadium on the campus of McMaster University

On 21 November 2013, the MLL announced that the team would not participate in the 2014 season, with most of the players being transferred to the expansion Florida Launch. The team was expected to attempt to rejoin the league for the 2015 season once construction of the new Tim Hortons Field in Hamilton was completed, much like the Rochester Rattlers did for the 2011 season, but failed to do so. No information on a return has been reported.

== Season-by-season ==
Hamilton Nationals
Year	W	L	%	Regular season	Playoffs
2009	7	5	.583	2nd	Won semifinal 14–13 over Lizards; Won championship 10–9 Over Outlaws
2010	3	9	.250	6th	
2011	7	5	.583	3rd	Won semifinal 11–9 over Denver Outlaws; Lost championship 10–9 to Boston Cannons
2012	4	10	.286	7th	
2013	9	5	.750	3rd	Lost semifinal 12–13 to Chesapeake Bayhawks
Totals	30	34	.469		3 wins, 2 losses

== Head coaches ==
#	Name	Term	Regular season				Playoffs			
#	Name	Term	GC	W	L	W%	GC	W	L	W%
1	Dave Huntley	2009–2010	24	10	14	.417	2	2	0	1.000
2	Regy Thorpe	2011–2012	26	11	15	.423	2	1	1	.500
3	Dave Huntley	2013	14	9	5	.643	1	0	1	.000
