= Selby Stadium =

- U.S. National Register of Historic Places
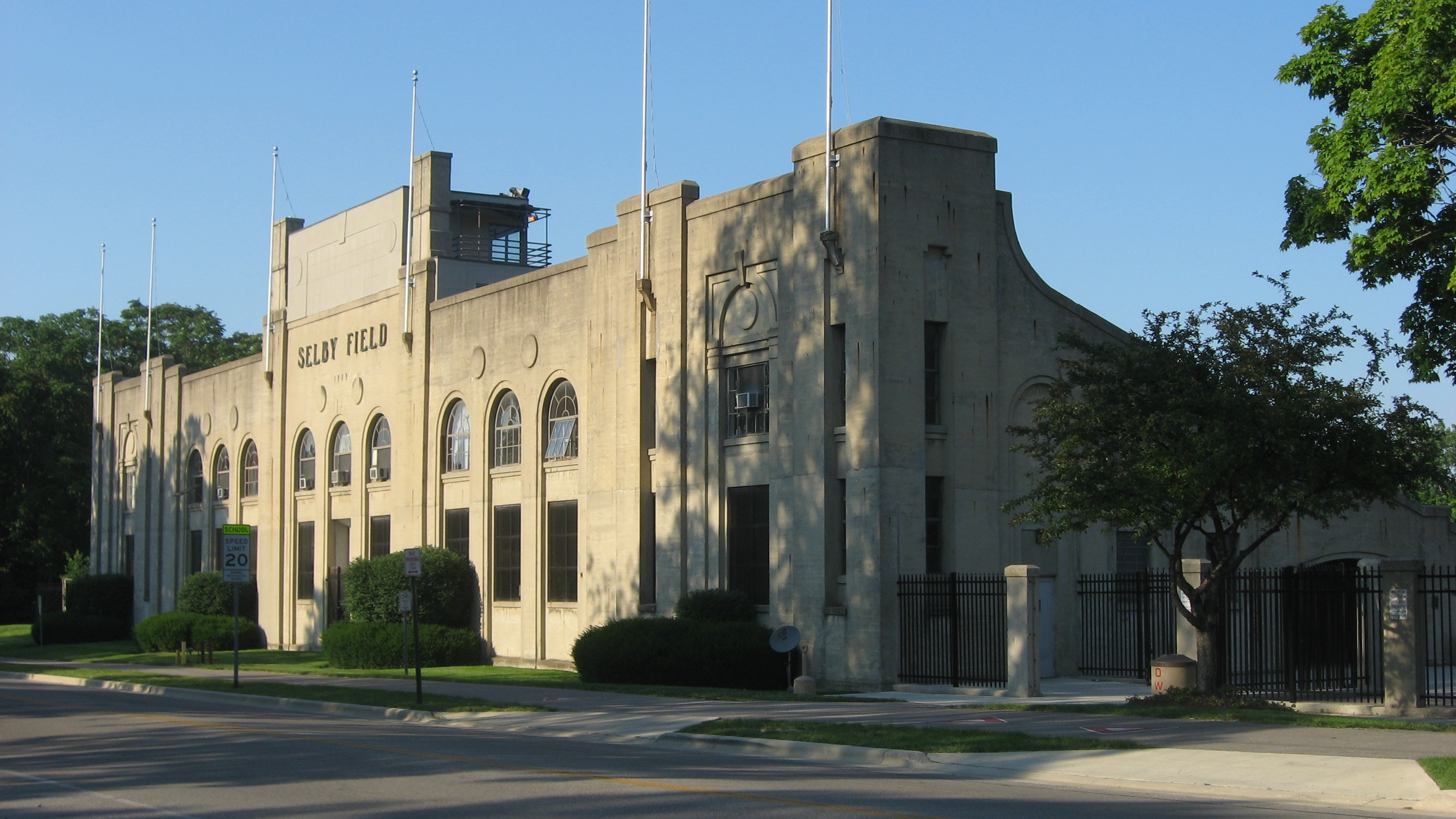
- Exterior view in 2010
- Location: OWU, Delaware, OH
- Coordinates: 40°17′48″N 83°3′49″W
- Area: less than one acre
- Built: 1929; 97 years ago
- Architectural style: Classical Revival
- Restored: 2011, 2014
- Website: battlingbishops.com
- MPS: Ohio Wesleyan University TR
- NRHP reference No.: 85000635
- Added to NRHP: March 18, 1985

Selby Stadium is a multi-purpose stadium located at Ohio Wesleyan University in Delaware, Ohio. The venue serves as home to the Battling Bishops football, men's and women's lacrosse, women's field hockey, and track and field teams.

Selby has a seating capacity of 9,100, with all seats falling between the 15-yard lines of the field. Its press box was lauded as the largest in Ohio outside of Ohio Stadium.

== Overview ==
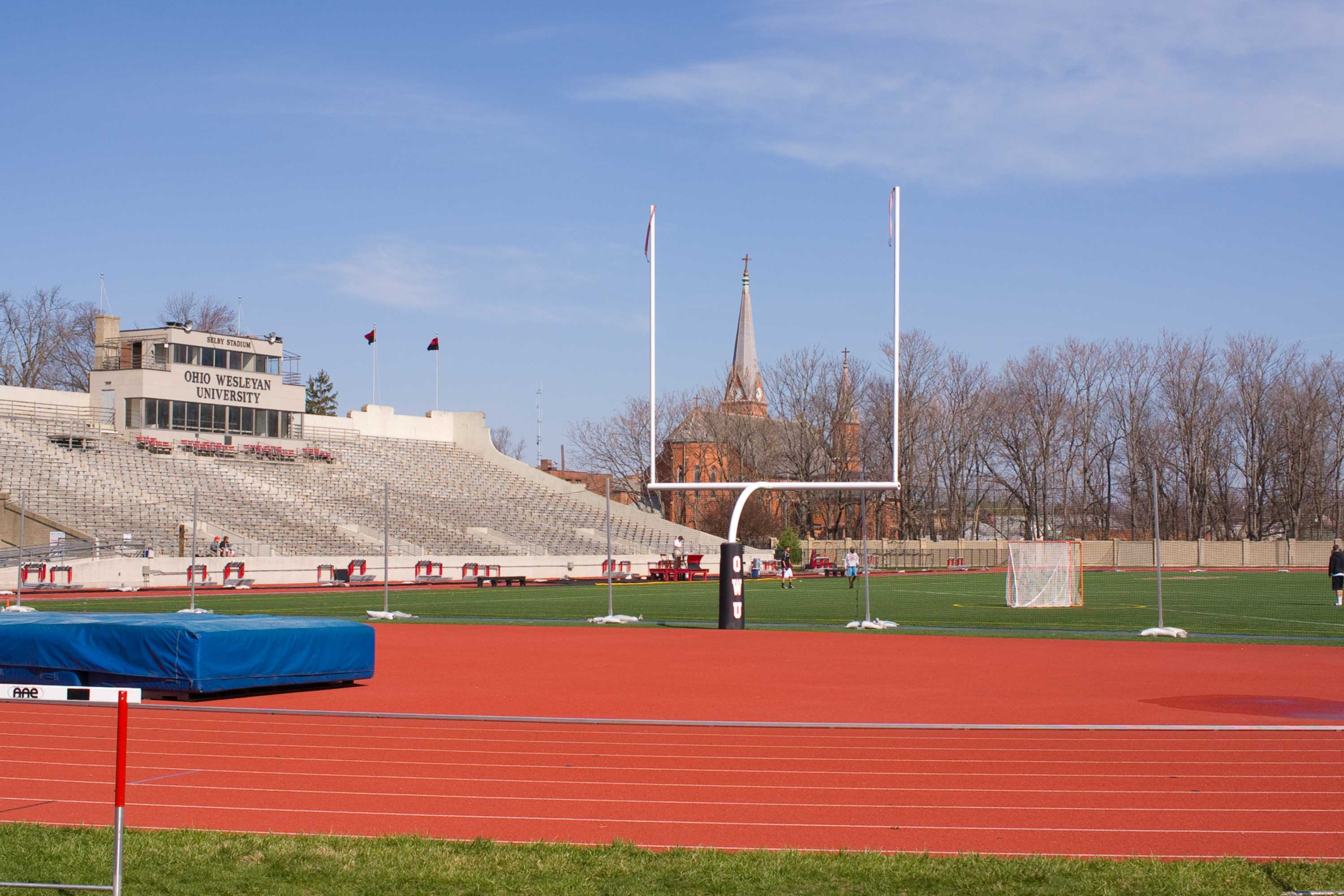
View of the athletics track and pitch of the stadium

Built in 1929, the grandstands of Selby are two separate smooth-finished concrete structures which provide seating for 9,100.

On March 18, 1985, Selby Field was added to the National Register of Historic Places.

Originally equipped with natural grass, the field switched to a FieldTurf artificial grass playing surface. Selby Stadium had previously been remodelled in 2010–11, when a lighting system and a video scoreboard were added.

Selby Field is located on South Henry Street, just east of the academic and administrative buildings of Ohio Wesleyan.

From 2012 through 2015, the Ohio Machine of Major League Lacrosse played home games at Selby Field.
