= Ron Joyce Stadium =

Football stadium on the campus of McMaster University in Hamilton, Ontario, Canada

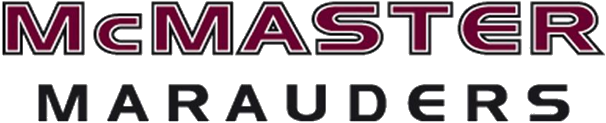

- View of the stadium in 2026
- Interactive map of Ron Joyce Stadium
- Address: Hamilton, Ontario; Canada
- Owner: McMaster University
- Operator: McMaster University Athletics
- Capacity: Football: 6,000 (12,000 with temporary seating)
- Type: Stadium
- Surface: Artificial turf
- Current use: Football; Soccer; Rugby union Lacrosse

Construction
- Opened: 2008; 18 years ago
- Cost: C$43 million
- Architect: Diamond + Schmitt Architects Inc

Tenants
- McMaster Marauders (U Sports) teams: football, soccer, rugby (2008–present); Hamilton Nationals (MLL) (2011–2013); Hamilton Tiger-Cats (CFL) (2014); Hamilton United (L1O) (2018–present (women) and 2022-present (men))

Website
- mcmaster.ca/ron-joyce-stadium

Ron Joyce Stadium is a stadium owned by McMaster University in Hamilton, Ontario, Canada.

The stadium is the home of the McMaster Marauders football, soccer, and rugby union teams and the Hamilton Nationals of Major League Lacrosse. The stadium features 6,000 permanent seats and temporary seating for an additional 6,000 on the other side of the field when needed for national events. An underground parking garage is below the stadium grounds that will serve visitors to the stadium plus daily campus parking needs. The Hamilton Tiger-Cats of the Canadian Football League also use the stadium for training during the spring and summer.

The stadium features a large press box with facilities for live TV and radio broadcasts, as well as working areas for print media, game operations staff, as well as home and visiting team coaches and spotters.

The participant level of the stadium features dressing rooms for the visiting teams and game officials, as well as more luxurious dressing room facilities for Marauder football, soccer, and rugby teams. There is also a satellite sports medicine clinic for players to receive taping and treatments. Multi-purpose rooms are also used for video review of game tape.

The dressing rooms are also used for players and referees taking part in contests in the Burridge gym as there was a lack of quality, private accommodations for officials and players previous to the stadium's completion.

The Marauders played their Ontario University Athletics games in 2005, 2006, and 2007 at the Hamilton Tiger-Cats' Ivor Wynne Stadium. Inversely, the Tiger-Cats began their 2014 season at Ron Joyce Stadium after Tim Hortons Field fell behind schedule in construction.
