= 2009 NCAA Division I men's lacrosse tournament =

American college lacrosse tournament

- Dates: May 9–25, 2009
- Teams: 16
- Finals site: Gillette Stadium, Foxborough, Massachusetts
- Champions: Syracuse (10th title)
- Runner-up: Cornell (7th title game)
- Semifinalists: Duke (5th Final Four); Virginia (20th Final Four)
- Winning coach: John Desko (5th title)
- MOP: Kenny Nims, Syracuse
- Attendance: 36,594 semi-finals 41,935 finals 78,529 total
- Top scorer: Rob Pannell, Cornell (16 goals)

The 2009 NCAA Division I lacrosse tournament was the 39th annual tournament hosted by the National Collegiate Athletic Association to determine the team champion of men's college lacrosse among its Division I programs, held at the end of the 2009 NCAA Division I men's lacrosse season. The tournament was played from May 9–25, 2009.

Syracuse defeated Cornell in the final, 10–9 in overtime.

The championship game was played at Gillette Stadium, the home of the NFL's New England Patriots, in Foxborough, Massachusetts, with 41,935 fans in attendance.

The first round of the tournament was played on May 9–10 at the home fields of the seeded teams. The quarterfinals were held on May 16–17 on neutral site fields at Hofstra University (James M. Shuart Stadium) and the United States Naval Academy (Navy–Marine Corps Memorial Stadium). The tournament culminated with the semifinals and final held on Memorial Day weekend.

== Qualifying teams ==
Sixteen NCAA Division I college men's lacrosse teams met after having played their way through a regular season, and for some, a conference tournament, to play in the NCAA Tournament.

The NCAA Division I Men's Lacrosse Committee selected the participating teams for the championship tournament. The committee announced the qualifying teams and the seeding order on Sunday, May 3, 2009. Seven conferences received automatic bids for their top team. The remaining nine teams were selected by the committee as "at-large" bids.

Five conferences held tournament championships, which also determined their NCAA bids. Siena earned an automatic bid by winning the Metro Atlantic Athletic Conference (MAAC) championship for both their first conference title and first NCAA tournament appearance. Villanova earned an automatic bid by winning Colonial Athletic Association (CAA) championship and also made its NCAA tournament debut. Navy earned an automatic bid by winning its fifth Patriot League championship in six years. Both Notre Dame and UMBC repeated as conference champions by winning the Great Western Lacrosse League (GWLL) and America East Conference, respectively.

Two conferences awarded their bids based on regular season performance. UMass earned the Eastern College Athletic Conference (ECAC) championship and its automatic with a 6–1 conference record. The Ivy League awarded its automatic bid to Cornell. Princeton and Cornell possessed identical conference records and were named co-champions. The head-to-head regular season game, which Cornell had won, acted as the tie-breaking criterion.

The remaining nine berths were awarded to at-large teams. Duke won the Atlantic Coast Conference (ACC) tournament for the third straight season, but the league does not receive an automatic bid because it does not have at least six members. Nevertheless, all four ACC teams received at-large bids: Duke, Maryland, North Carolina, and Virginia. Additionally, the NCAA Selection Committee awarded at-large bids to: independents Johns Hopkins and Syracuse, Brown and Princeton of the Ivy League, and Hofstra of the CAA.

== Tournament bracket ==
First Round; May 9–10
1	Virginia	18
Villanova	6
Brown	11
8	Johns Hopkins	12 *
5	Cornell	11
Hofstra	8
Massachusetts	7
4	Princeton	10
3	Duke	14
Navy	5
UMBC	13
6	North Carolina	15
7	Notre Dame	3
Maryland	7
Siena	4
2	Syracuse	11

Quarterfinals; May 16–17
1	Virginia	19
8	Johns Hopkins	8
5	Cornell	6
4	Princeton	4
3	Duke	12
6	North Carolina	11
Maryland	6
2	Syracuse	11

Semifinals; May 23
1	Virginia	6
5	Cornell	15
3	Duke	7
2	Syracuse	17

Final; May 25
5	Cornell	9
2	Syracuse	10*

- * = Overtime

== Game summaries ==
=== First round ===
The 1st round of the tournament, seven of the eight seeded teams advanced. Every past NCAA tournament had been won by seven of the eight teams that advanced to the quarterfinals, with Duke being the only one to have never won a national title, up to this tournament. For the first time, all four Atlantic Coast Conference (ACC) teams advanced to the second round. It was just the second time in tournament history that four teams from the same conference advanced. The first instance occurred in 1990 with Brown, Harvard, Princeton, and Yale of the Ivy League.

The tournament began on Saturday, May 9, when the Brown Bears traveled to face the eighth-seeded Johns Hopkins Blue Jays at Homewood Field in Baltimore. The Blue Jays pulled away to three-goal leads in the first and final quarters, but the Bears equalized both times. In the final ten seconds of regulation, Brown attackman Kyle Hollingsworth batted in a loose ball to even the score, 11–11. In overtime, Hopkins won the faceoff and called a timeout, before Brian Christopher drove up the right side of the field and made a game-winning top-corner shot on the run. It was the third overtime goal by Christopher in Hopkins' past four games.

UMBC then played at number-six seed North Carolina. The UMBC Retrievers possessed the most efficient extra-man offense (EMO) and the best-rated midfield in the nation. Their roster, however, lacked depth, and the first-string midfielders were forced to play in the 90 °F (32 °C) heat for almost the entire game. At halftime, the Retrievers led the Tar Heels, 8–6. The lead changed hands several times in the third period, before North Carolina took control for the remainder of the game to win, 15–13. Tar Heels attackman Billy Bitter, who attempted only nine shots, matched the school single-game record with eight goals.

Hofstra played at fifth-seeded Cornell, where the teams were even at halftime, 5–5. The third period was the decisive quarter, and Cornell won three face-offs and outscored Hofstra five-to-one. In Durham, third-seeded Duke hosted Navy. At halftime, the Blue Devils led 10–0 and expanded the rout to 13–1 at the start of the final period. Duke advanced with a final score of 14–5.

The second day of the tournament began with the Maryland Terrapins facing the seventh-seeded Notre Dame Fighting Irish at home in South Bend, Indiana. The Fighting Irish entered the game in possession of a perfect 15–0 record, but still considered an unknown variable due to their schedule. The magazine Inside Lacrosse called the Terrapins a talented team that had underachieved during the regular season. The first-ranked Notre Dame defense frustrated Maryland, but the Terps still managed to gain a 6–1 lead in the third quarter. Maryland's defense effectively shut-down Notre Dame and the leading Irish scorer Ryan Hoff was unable to make a single shot on goal. Maryland was the only unseeded team to advance to the quarterfinals.

Both schools making their inaugural NCAA tournament appearance suffered quick elimination. The Villanova Wildcats were trounced by the Virginia Cavaliers, 18–6. The Cavaliers were led by Brian Carroll's career-high five goal performance. The Siena Saints were held scoreless for nearly 42 minutes in their loss to the Syracuse Orange, 11–4. Onondaga Community College transfer Cody Jamieson, who had just been cleared academically, scored three goals in his first start for the Orange.

At Princeton University, the Tigers defeated the visiting UMass Minutemen, 10–7. Princeton was led by Mark Kovler's six-point effort. The game was the final in the collegiate career of Minutemen goalkeeper Doc Schneider who led his team to the 2006 championship game as a freshman. His opposite number, Princeton's Tyler Fiorito, became just the second freshman goalkeeper to start an NCAA tournament game for the Tigers.

=== Quarterfinals ===
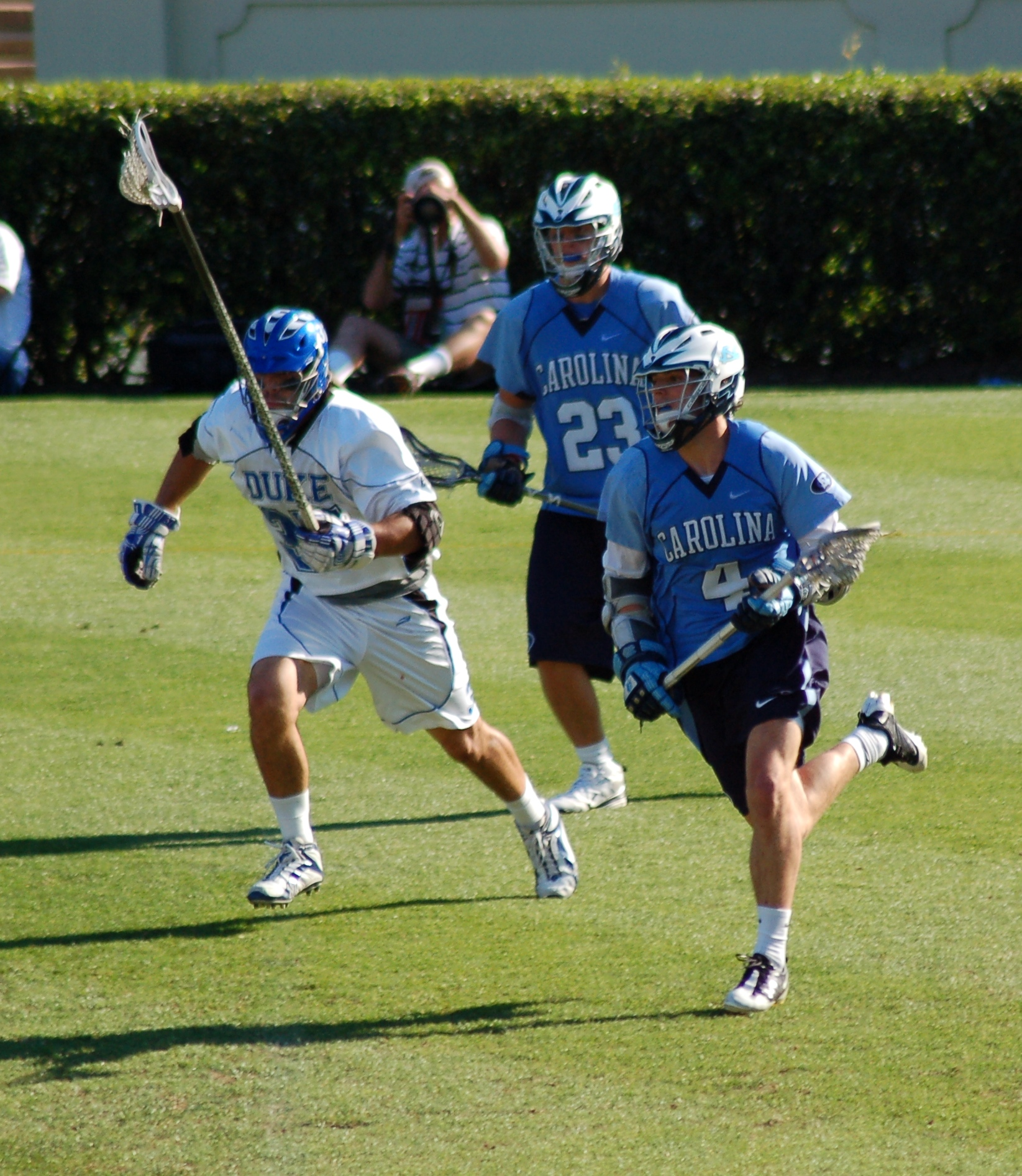
Duke and North Carolina met twice earlier in 2009, including during the ACC championship (pictured).

The quarterfinals took place over the weekend of May 16 to 17 at two neutral sites. The first doubleheader was sponsored on Saturday by Hofstra University, followed by games held at the United States Naval Academy on Sunday. Despite overcast weather at both locations, it was the first time that each NCAA quarterfinals venue attracted in excess of 11,000 spectators.

The second round opened at Hofstra's James M. Shuart Stadium with the Maryland–Syracuse match-up. Al Cavalieri filled in as the Orange goalkeeper for long-time starter John Galloway who was sick with the flu. Syracuse scored three unanswered goals in the first quarter before Maryland goalie Brian Phipps suffered an ACL tear. Terrapins midfielder Grant Catalino narrowed the deficit to 5–3 before halftime on an extra-man score. In the second half, Syracuse made defensive adjustments to shut down Maryland's behind-the-goal attack, and the Orange tallied three times in the span of 2:10 to pull away in the third quarter. Syracuse won, 11–6, and extended its postseason streak against Maryland to five.

Ivy League rivals Cornell and Princeton then had their 70th meeting, but first in the NCAA tournament. Earlier in the postseason, the Big Red defeated the Tigers to split the Ivy League championship. Three Princeton shots hit the post in the first half of the second quarter, and Cornell entered halftime with a 5–1 advantage. In the third quarter, Tigers attackman Tommy Davis ended their 27:58 scoring drought with a 15-yard shot. Princeton quickly tallied again with 28 seconds in the period. In the final quarter, the Big Red withstood two penalties to win, 6–4.

The second day of the quarterfinals took place at Navy–Marine Corps Memorial Stadium in Annapolis, Maryland. The first game featured top-ranked Virginia and Johns Hopkins. The Cavaliers dominated the Blue Jays, 19–8, in their worst postseason defeat in school history. Shamel Bratton of Virginia scored a career-high five goals. The victory marked the 300th of head coach Dom Starsia's career, and he became the third coach in Division I lacrosse history to win as many games. Virginia advanced to their fourth Final Four appearance in five seasons. With the quarterfinals elimination of both Maryland and Johns Hopkins, 2009 became only the third time since the NCAA tournament began that no team from the state participated in the Final Four.

The final game of the round featured intrastate rivals Duke and North Carolina in their third meeting of the season. In the first quarter, the Blue Devils jumped out to an early lead and survived a two-man-down penalty, but the Tar Heels scored four unanswered goals to briefly take the lead in the second quarter. Late in the final period, North Carolina rallied from a four-point deficit to trail by one goal, 12–11. As time expired, a shot by Sean Delaney missed high over the goal, and Duke defeated North Carolina for the third time of the year. The Blue Devils' Zach Howell scored a career-high three goals and Tewaaraton Trophy finalist Ned Crotty tallied twice and had six assists. The Duke defense held Carolina's leading scorer, Billy Bitter, to just two assists.

=== Semifinals ===
==== Syracuse vs. Duke ====
	1	2	3	4	Total
Syracuse	4	4	6	3	17
Duke	2	2	2	1	7

Syracuse met Duke for the first game at Gillette Stadium in Foxborough, Massachusetts, which was attended by 36,594 fans, a decrease from the previous year's 48,224. Nine Orange players scored in a rout of the Blue Devils, 17–7, which demonstrated the depth of the Syracuse offense. It was the most goals allowed by Duke all season. Seniors Kenny Nims and Patrick Perritt led the Orange with four goals each. Freshman Tim Desko, son of head coach John Desko, and heralded transfer Cody Jamieson each tallied twice. The Orange dominated the faceoff circle and won 18 of 28 draws. To open the third quarter, senior Jake Moulton won the opening faceoff and scored nine seconds into the half. With the victory, the Orange advanced to the championship game for the seventh time since 1999.

==== Cornell vs. Virginia ====
	1	2	3	4	Total
Cornell	4	4	3	4	15
Virginia	1	1	2	2	6

In the second game of the day, fifth-seeded Cornell upset first-ranked Virginia. The Big Red upset the Cavaliers decisively, 15–6, and advanced to the championship game for the first time in over two decades. Cornell controlled the game from the start, and accounted for the game's first three tallies and entered halftime with an 8–2 advantage. Big Red freshman Rob Pannell, junior Ryan Hurley, and senior Chris Finn each scored three times. The Cornell defense created 18 turnovers and stymied Virginia's high-powered attack. Commenting on the upset, Cornell head coach Jeff Tambroni said, "We knew we weren't going to have a whole lot of believers out there. We needed to play hard first and believe second."

=== Championship ===
==== Syracuse vs. Cornell ====
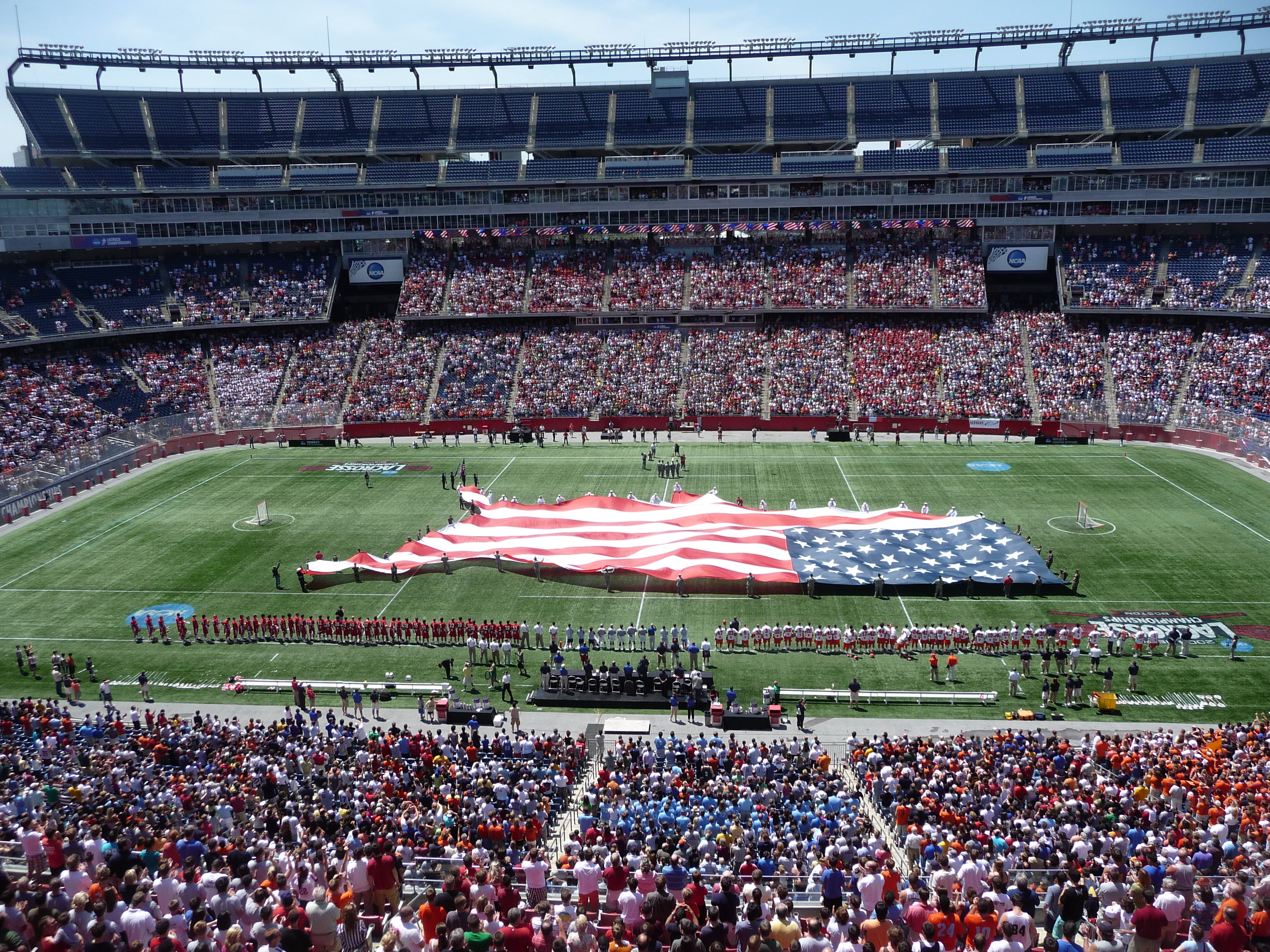
NCAA Championship 2009. Syracuse vs. Cornell pregame in Gillette Stadium. Syracuse would win 10-9 in OT.

	1	2	3	4	OT	Total
Syracuse	2	2	1	4	1	10
Cornell	3	3	1	2	0	9

The final game was also held at Gillette Stadium on Memorial Day May 25. Cornell controlled the game for the first 56 minutes and frustrated Syracuse with a tough defense. With just over five minutes to go in the fourth quarter, the Big Red led, 9–6, before Syracuse's Stephen Keogh and Cody Jamieson narrowed the deficit to one goal with 2:46 remaining. Keogh attempted another shot but missed and Cornell took possession with 27.6 seconds left to play. Kenny Nims dislodged the ball from Matt Moyer and Keogh recovered the ball, making a wild pass, which was caught by Syracuse's Matt Abbott. As he was flattened by Cornell defenders, Abbott got off a desperation pass to Nims, who had run from midfield to the very edge of the crease. The pass was tipped by Cornell's Roy Lang, but Nims was able to gather in the tipped pass and connect with his shot on goal with four seconds left, sending the game into overtime. Cornell won the overtime faceoff, but Syracuse defenseman Sid Smith stripped Ryan Hurley to create a turnover. Dan Hardy feigned a shot before passing to Jamieson, positioned just beyond the crease, who scored the game-winner.

== Post-tournament honors ==
After the championship, Cornell midfielder Max Seibald was honored with the Tewaaraton Trophy for the most outstanding Division I men's lacrosse player. Syracuse attackman Kenny Nims was named the Most Outstanding Player of the tournament. The NCAA named its "All-Tournament Team" following the championship game, which consisted of five players each from Syracuse and Cornell. The following individuals made up that team:

Player	Position	School	Class
Matt Abbott	Midfielder	Syracuse	Senior
John Glynn	Midfielder	Cornell	Senior
Ryan Hurley	Attackman	Cornell	Junior
Cody Jamieson	Attackman	Syracuse	Junior
Matt Moyer	Defenseman	Cornell	Senior
Kenny Nims	Attackman	Syracuse	Senior
Rob Pannell	Attackman	Cornell	Freshman
Pat Perritt	Midfielder	Syracuse	Senior
Max Seibald	Midfielder	Cornell	Senior
Joel White	Longstick Midfielder	Syracuse	Sophomore

== Record by conference ==
Conference	Bids	Record	Win %	Quarterfinals	Semifinals	Final	Champions
Atlantic Coast Conference	4	6–4	.600	4	2	–	–
Ivy League	3	4–3	.571	2	1	1	–
Independent	2	5–1	.833	2	1	1	1
Colonial Athletic Association	2	0–2	.000	–	–	–	–
America East Conference	1	0–1	.000	–	–	–	–
Eastern College Athletic Conference	1	0–1	.000	–	–	–	–
Great Western Lacrosse League	1	0–1	.000	–	–	–	–
Metro Atlantic Athletic Conference	1	0–1	.000	–	–	–	–
Patriot League	1	0–1	.000	–	–	–	–

== See also ==
- 2009 NCAA Division I women's lacrosse tournament
- 2009 NCAA Division II men's lacrosse tournament
- 2009 NCAA Division III men's lacrosse tournament
