= Jack Turnbull Award =

The "Lt. Col. J. I. Turnbull Award" — also known as the Jack Turnbull Award — is an award given to the United States' top collegiate attackman in lacrosse, named after National Lacrosse Hall of Fame alumnus Jack Turnbull. The award is given to a player in Division I, Division II, and Division III.

== Award winners ==
Year	Player	School
1946	Stu McLean	United States Naval Academy
1947	Brooke Tunstall	Johns Hopkins University
1948	Brooke Tunstall	Johns Hopkins University
1949	Lee Chambers	United States Naval Academy
1950	Oliver Shepard	Johns Hopkins University
1951	Don Hahn	Princeton University
1952	Gordy Jones	University of Virginia
1953	Buzzy Budnitz	Johns Hopkins University
1954	Rennie Smith	University of Maryland
1955	Percy Williams	United States Naval Academy
1956	Hezzy Howard	Washington College
1957	Jack Daut	Rutgers University
1958	Dick Corrigan	University of Maryland
1959	Bill Morrill	Johns Hopkins University
1960	Bob Miser	United States Military Academy
1961	Tom Mitchell	United States Naval Academy
1962	Jerry Schmidt	Johns Hopkins University
1963	Ray Altman	University of Maryland
1964	Jim Lewis	United States Naval Academy
1965	Jim Lewis	United States Naval Academy
1966	Jim Lewis	United States Naval Academy
1967	Jack Heim	University of Maryland
1968	Joe Cowan	Johns Hopkins University
1969	Joe Cowan	Johns Hopkins University
1970	Pete Cramblet	United States Military Academy
1971	Tom Cafaro	United States Military Academy
1972	John Kaestner	University of Maryland
1973	Jack Thomas	Johns Hopkins University
1974	Jack Thomas	Johns Hopkins University
1975	Eamon McEneaney	Cornell University
1976	Mike French	Cornell University
1977	Mike O’Neill	Johns Hopkins University
1978	Mike O’Neill	Johns Hopkins University
1979	Bob Boniello	University of Maryland
1980	Mike Buzzell	United States Naval Academy
1981	Jeff Cook	Johns Hopkins University
1982	Jeff Cook	Johns Hopkins University
1983	Tim Nelson	Syracuse University
1984	Tim Nelson	Syracuse University
1985	Tim Nelson	Syracuse University
1986	Roddy Marino	University of Virginia
1987	Tim Goldstein	Cornell University
1988	John Zulberti	Syracuse University
1989	John Zulberti	Syracuse University
1990	Greg Burns	Syracuse University
1991	Mark Douglas	University of Maryland
1992	Darren Lowe	Brown University
1993	Matt Riter	Syracuse University
1994	Kevin Lowe	Princeton University
1995	Terry Riordan	Johns Hopkins University
1996	Michael Watson	University of Virginia
1997	Jon Hess	Princeton University
1998	Casey Powell	Syracuse University
1999	John Grant	University of Delaware
2000	Ryan Powell	Syracuse University
2001	Michael Powell	Syracuse University
2002	Michael Powell	Syracuse University
2003	Michael Powell	Syracuse University
2004	Michael Powell	Syracuse University
2005	Matt Danowski	Duke University
2006	Joe Walters	University of Maryland
2007	Matt Danowski	Duke University
2008	Zack Greer	Duke University
2009	Ned Crotty	Duke University
2010	Rob Pannell	Cornell University
2011	Rob Pannell	Cornell University
2012	Steele Stanwick	University of Virginia
2013	Lyle Thompson	University at Albany
2014	Lyle Thompson	University at Albany
2015	Kevin Rice	Syracuse University
2016	Dylan Molloy	Brown University
2017	Connor Fields	University at Albany
2018	Pat Spencer	Loyola University Maryland
2019	Grant Ament	Penn State
2020	None	(Season canceled due to COVID-19 Pandemic)
2021	Chris Gray	North Carolina
2022	Chris Gray	North Carolina
2023	CJ Kirst	Cornell University
2024	Connor Shellenberger	University of Virginia
2025	Jackson Eicher	United States Military Academy
2026	Joey Spallina	Syracuse

=== By University ===
Rank	School	Number of Awards	Winning years
T-1	Johns Hopkins University	15	1947, 1948, 1950, 1953, 1959, 1962, 1968, 1969, 1973, 1974, 1977, 1978, 1981, 1982, 1995
T-1	Syracuse University	15	1983, 1984, 1985, 1988, 1989, 1990, 1993, 1998, 2000, 2001, 2002, 2003, 2004, 2015, 2026
T-3	United States Naval Academy	8	1946, 1949, 1955, 1961, 1964, 1965, 1966, 1980
T-3	University of Maryland	8	1954, 1958, 1963, 1967, 1972, 1979, 1991, 2006
5	Cornell University	6	1975, 1976, 1987, 2010, 2011, 2023
6	University of Virginia	5	1952, 1986, 1996, 2012, 2024
T-7	Duke University	4	2005, 2007, 2008, 2009
T-7	United States Military Academy	4	1960, 1970, 1971, 2025
T-9	University at Albany	3	2013, 2014, 2017
T-9	Princeton University	3	1951, 1994, 1997
11	North Carolina	2	2021, 2022
T-12	Multiple winners tied with 1		

== See also ==
- F. Morris Touchstone Award
- Lt. Raymond Enners Award
- McLaughlin Award
- Schmeisser Award
