= List of Senior CLASS Award men's lacrosse winners =

Senior CLASS Award for men's lacrosse
- Awarded for: the outstanding senior NCAA Division I Student-Athlete of the Year in men's lacrosse
- Country: United States
- Presented by: Premier Sports Management
- First award: 2007
- Currently held by: Matt Moore, Virginia
- Website: http://www.seniorclassaward.com/lacrosse/

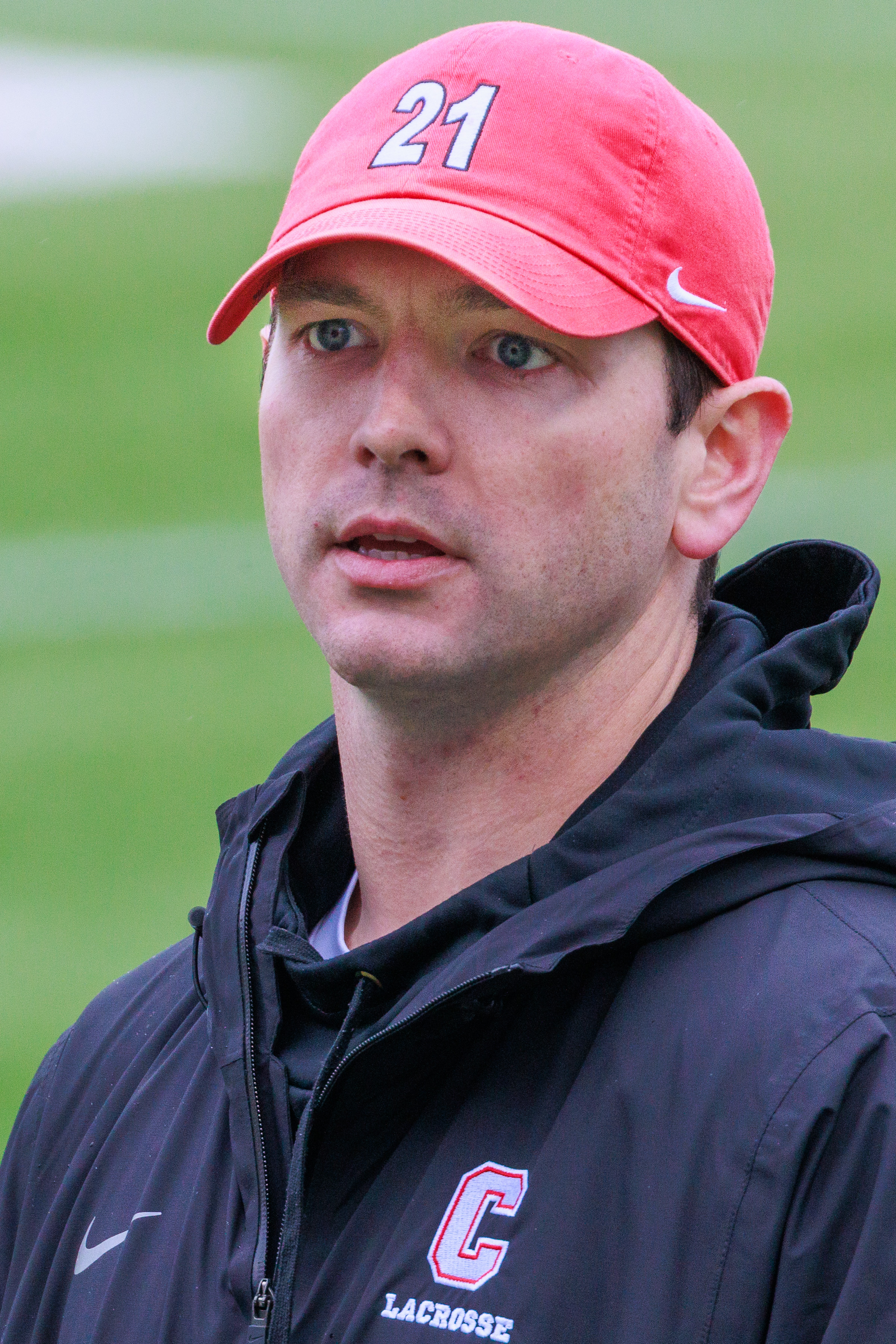
2015 recipient Connor Buczek

The Senior CLASS Award is presented each year to the outstanding senior NCAA Division I Student-Athlete of the Year in men's lacrosse. The award was established in 2007.

So far, no women's version of this award has been created. Three NCAA sports that are sponsored for both men and women have Senior CLASS Awards for only one sex—ice hockey and lacrosse do not have women's awards, and volleyball does not have a men's award.

Year	Winner	School
2007	Matt McMonagle	Cornell
2008	Mike Leveille	Syracuse
2009	Max Seibald	Cornell
2010	Andrew Maisano	Army
2011	Brian Karalunas	Villanova
2012	C. J. Costabile	Duke
2013	Brendan Buckley	Army
2014	Tom Schreiber	Princeton
2015	Connor Buczek	Cornell
2016	Jack Kelly	Brown
2017	Isaiah Davis-Allen	Maryland
2018	Jake Pulver	Cornell
2019	Ryan Conrad	Virginia
2020	Not presented; season canceled in progress	
2021	Jake Carraway	Georgetown
2022	Matt Moore	Virginia

== Winners by school ==
School	Winners
Cornell	4
Army	2
Virginia	2
Brown	1
Duke	1
Georgetown	1
Maryland	1
Princeton	1
Syracuse	1
Villanova	1
