= Matt Abbott =

Matt Abbott may refer to:

- Matt Abbott (lacrosse)
- Matt Abbott (sailor)
- Matt Abbott, lyricist with the British duo Skint & Demoralised
