= Rob Pannell =

American professional lacrosse player

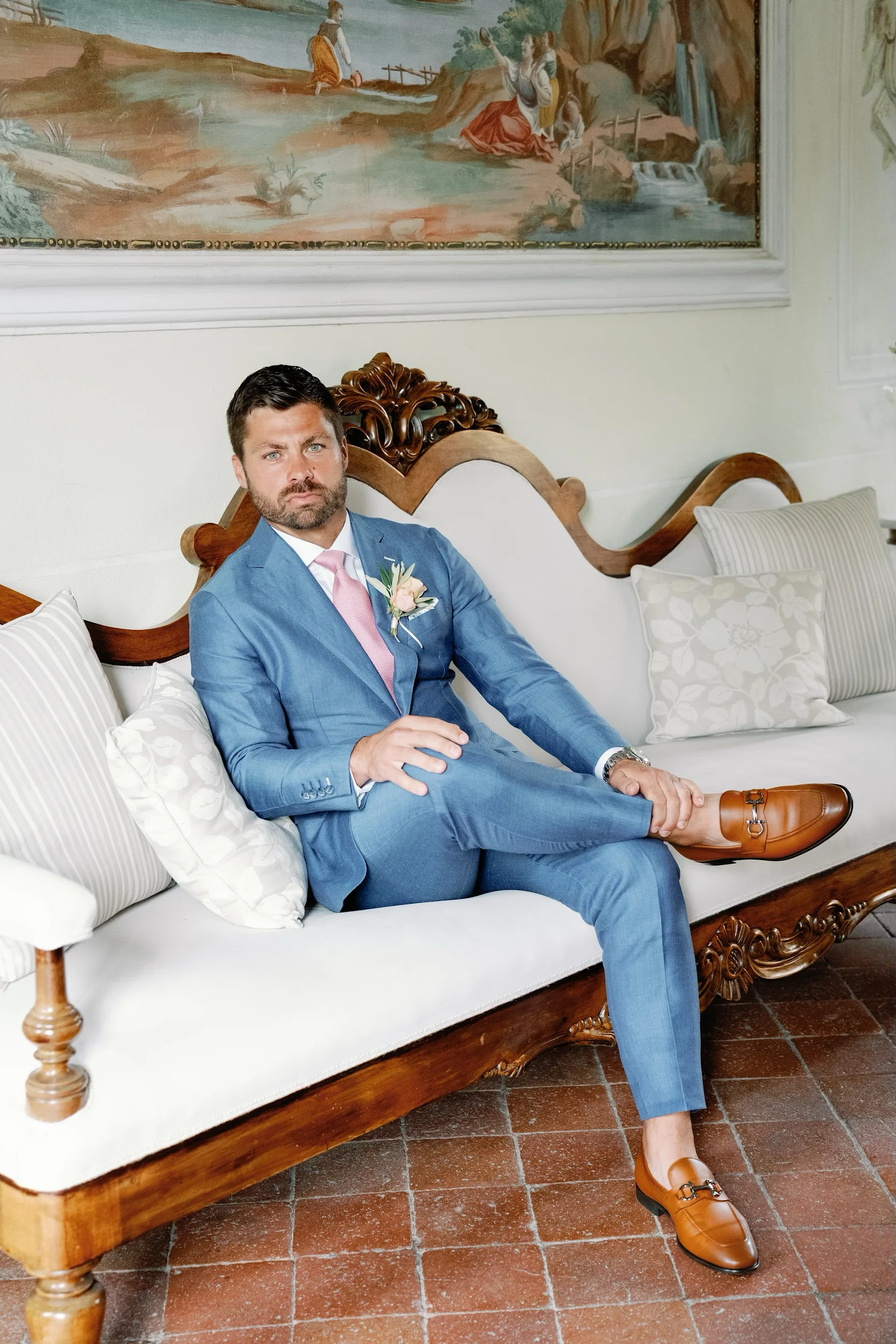
- Pannell in a suit at a formal event

Personal information
- Nickname: RP3
- Nationality: United States
- Born: December 11, 1989 (age 36) Smithtown, New York, U.S.
- Height: 5 ft 9 in (175 cm)
- Weight: 205 lb (93 kg; 14 st 9 lb)
- Website: RobPannell3.com

Sport
- Position: Attackman
- Shoots: Right
- NCAA team: Cornell (2013)
- NLL draft: 50th overall, 2013; Philadelphia Wings
- MLL draft: 1st overall, 2012; New York Lizards
- PLL team Former teams: Maryland Whipsnakes (2025-present); Atlas Lacrosse Club (2019) Redwoods Lacrosse Club (2020-2024)

Career highlights
- NCAA: Fourth place all time for career NCAA points (354 career points); 2013 Tewaaraton Trophy; 2× Lt. Raymond Enners Award (2011, 2013); 2× Jack Turnbull Award (2010, 2011); NCAA Division I Men's Lacrosse Championship Finalist (2009); 3× Ivy League Player of the Year (2010, 2011, 2013); 4× First Team All-Ivy League (2009, 2010, 2011, 2013); ESPY Nominee for Best Collegiate Athlete (2011); MLL: MLL Champion (2015); Single Season Points Record (78); MLL MVP (2018); MLL Offensive Player of the Year (2016, 2018); MLL Rookie of the Year (2013); MLL All-Star (2013, 2014, 2015, 2016, 2017, 2018, 2019); MLL All-Pro (2014, 2015, 2016, 2018); PLL: 4× All-Star (2021, 2022, 2023, 2024); International: Member of Team USA (2014, 2018, 2023); All-World (2014, 2018); FIL Most Outstanding Attackman (2014)
Medal record
Representing United States
Men's lacrosse
World Lacrosse Championship
| Winner | 2018 Netanya |
| Winner | 2023 San Diego |
| Runner-up | 2014 Denver |

Rob Pannell (born December 11, 1989) is an American professional lacrosse player who plays for the Maryland Whipsnakes of the Premier Lacrosse League.

He played college lacrosse at Cornell University. He is one of the top leading scorers in men's Division I lacrosse history. He currently holds the Cornell career points record and assists record. He was the Ivy League's first ever three-time Player of the Year award winner. He was voted the NCAA's Outstanding Player of the Year in Men's Lacrosse in both 2011 and 2013 when he was awarded the Lt. Raymond Enners Award by the USILA. In 2013, he also won the 2013 Tewaaraton Trophy as the most outstanding American college lacrosse player.

Pannell won the MLL championship in 2015 and won the MLL MVP in 2018. He has consistently been a PLL All-Star since 2021. He was a member of the Men's Team USA lacrosse team thrice consecutively in 2014, 2018 and 2023, named to the All-World team in 2014 and 2018.

Rob Pannell is widely regarded as one of the greatest lacrosse players of all time. As of 2026, he is the record holder for most career points in professional outdoor lacrosse. His signature move is the question mark dodge.

== High school ==
Pannell attended Smithtown High School in Smithtown, New York on Long Island. He played on the varsity lacrosse team for three years and led Long Island in scoring his senior year with a school record 130 points. Pannell was named offensive MVP of the team that season and earned a place on Newsday's All-Long Island second team. After the season, he was named to the 2007 high school All-American team. He also played football, basketball, and golf, earning Academic All-Division honors for football in his senior year.

After graduating, he attended Deerfield Academy for a post-graduate year, and played basketball and lacrosse. He set a Deerfield lacrosse record for points in a single season with 99. Additionally, he earned the Stewart Lindsay Jr. Award for the Outstanding Attackman in Division I high school lacrosse.

== College career ==
=== Freshman year (2009) ===
Pannell was the Ivy League Rookie of the Year and set the Cornell rookie record for points in a season, finishing with a team-high 67 points. This made him the fifth highest scoring player and the highest scoring freshman of the year. He earned third-team All-American honors after his first college season and was named first-team All-Ivy League. Cornell made it to the finals of the 2009 NCAA championship, but lost to Syracuse 10–9. Pannell led the team in postseason scoring with 16 points over four games, including a six-point effort against the University of Virginia in the semifinals.

=== Sophomore year (2010) ===
Pannell was a first-team All-American, a first-team All-Ivy League selection, the Ivy League Player of the Year and the USILA's Jack Turnbull Award winner as the Outstanding Attackman in Division I. His 80 points made him the third highest scorer in the league, behind only Ned Crotty and Max Quinzani of Duke. In just 25 games he tallied 100 points, the fastest Cornell player to do so since Tim Goldstein in 1987. Cornell made it to the final four of the NCAA tournament before losing to Notre Dame 12–7.

=== Junior year (2011) ===
Pannell was a first-team All-American, a first-team All-Ivy League selection, the Ivy League Player of the Year and the USILA's Jack Turnbull Award winner as the Outstanding Attackman in Division I - all repeat awards/recognitions from the previous year. His 89 points in 2011 led all players in the league, but Cornell only made it to the second round of the NCAA tournament before losing to Virginia 13–9.

Pannell was voted the National Player of the Year by the coaches of the United States Intercollegiate Lacrosse Association and presented with the Lt. Raymond Enners Award as the NCAA's Most Outstanding Player in men's college lacrosse.

He was nominated for a 2011 ESPY for Best Male College Athlete. He was one of five finalists in the category for 2011 and the only lacrosse player ever to be nominated. BYU basketball player Jimmer Fredette won the award that year.

=== Senior year (2012) ===
Before the start of his senior season at Cornell, the New York Lizards selected Pannell with the first overall pick in the 2012 Major League Lacrosse Collegiate Draft.

Pannell scored 16 points in the first two games of his senior season, but he broke his left foot in the second game against Army. Pannell attempted to rehabilitate his foot in time for the NCAA tournament, but he re-injured the foot in the month before the tournament. Cornell did not make the NCAA tournament in 2012.

Pannell applied to the Ivy League for a fifth year of eligibility as he did not graduate after the spring semester in 2013 due to taking an incomplete credit in one of his classes. The Ivy League does not grant medical redshirt years.

=== Fifth year (2013) ===
Pannell returned to Cornell University for the spring semester in 2013 and was eligible to participate in the 2013 lacrosse season. He led Cornell in scoring for the fourth time in five years and finished second in the NCAA with 102 points. Cornell made it to the semifinals of the 2013 NCAA championship, losing to the eventual champions Duke University 16–14. Pannell set the record of 354 all-time career NCAA points in the game, passing Matt Danowski. The record stood until 2015 when it was broken by Albany attackman Lyle Thompson, who finished his senior year with 400 career points.

Pannell again was voted the National Player of the Year by the coaches of the United States Intercollegiate Lacrosse Association and received his second Lt. Raymond Enners Award as the NCAA's Most Outstanding Player in men's college lacrosse. He was the Ivy League's first ever three-time Player of the Year award winner. After the end of the season he was named one of the five finalists for the Tewaaraton Award, which is annually presented to the most outstanding American college lacrosse player. Pannell was also a finalist in 2011, but lost to Steele Stanwick. In May 2013, he received the Tewaaraton trophy. The award was founded by The University Club of Washington, DC and is presented every year by The Tewaaraton Foundation.

== Professional career ==
=== 2012 ===
Number one draft choice in the 2012 Major League Lacrosse Collegiate Draft. He was selected by the New York Lizards.

=== 2013 ===
During rookie season, Pannell recorded 42 points (25 goals and 17 assists) in 10 games. He ranked second in overall points, second in goals, and fourth in assists in the league among rookies. He was selected to his first MLL All-Star game in 2013 and was named the 2013 Cascade Lacrosse Rookie of the Year.

=== 2014 ===
During his second year with the New York Lizards, Pannell was selected to his second All Star game appearance as named an MLL All-Pro. He led the Lizards in points with 33 goals and 23 assists. Pannell led the Lizards to a playoff appearance, losing to Denver in the semi-finals.

=== 2015 ===
Pannell's third year in the league included his third consecutive All-Star selection and he was named MLL All-Pro for the second year. Pannell led the league in scoring with 68 points, 38 goals and 30 assists, only the third player in MLL history to have at least 30 goals and 30 assists in a season. Pannell led the Lizards offensive attack all the way to the MLL Championship game. He scored four goals and one assist in that game with the Lizards defeating the Rochester Rattlers for the 2015 MLL Championship.

Pannell was inducted into the Suffolk Sports Hall of Fame on Long Island, New York, in the Lacrosse Category with the Class of 2015.

=== 2016 ===
Pannell was named the Warrior Offensive Player of the Year. He broke the single season points record with 74 points on the way to his second consecutive scoring title. Pannell led the league in points with 42 goals and 32 assists, becoming the second player in MLL history to record at least 30 goals and 30 assists in two or more seasons. The other player was Casey Powell. Pannell is the first player to score 40+ goals and have 30+ assists in a single season. He recorded a career high eight goals and nine points versus the Charlotte Hounds. He quarterbacked the New York Lizards to the #1 offense in the country and the team's third straight playoff appearance. Pannell was named to his fourth consecutive All-Star team and third consecutive MLL All-Pro team.

=== 2017 ===
Pannell played in 11 games with the New York Lizards. He was named an MLL All Star, finishing the season with 49 points, 23 goals and 26 assists. Pannell missed three games due to a thumb injury that required surgery midway through the season.

=== 2018 ===
Pannell played in 13 games with the New York Lizards, breaking his own single season scoring record with 78 points on 43 goals and 35 assists. His previous single season scoring record was 74 points. Pannell was named Coca-Cola MVP, Warrior Offensive MVP and an MLL-All Star for the sixth time.

=== 2019 ===
Pannell returned for his seventh season with the New York Lizards. This was the final year of a three-year deal that he signed with the team during April 2017.

=== 2020 ===
On March 9, 2020, Pannell announced that he would join the Premier Lacrosse League. A week later, he was selected with the third pick in the PLL Entry Draft by Atlas. During a shortened season due to COVID-19 limitations, Pannell scored 15 points on 6 goals and 9 assists.

=== 2021 ===
Prior to the start of the 2021 season, Pannell was traded to the Redwoods Lacrosse Club. In his first season with the Redwoods, Pannell played in 9 games, with 29 points, 13 goals, and 16 assists. Pannell was selected to the 2021 PLL all-star team.

=== 2022 ===
In his second season with the Redwoods Lacrosse Club, Pannell was a team leader, tallying 16 goals and 22 assists in 10 games. Pannell was again selected as a PLL all-star.

=== 2023 ===
A model of consistency, Pannell added 15 goals and 19 assists in 10 games on the season. He led the Redwoods to a 6–4 record in the regular season, qualifying for the playoffs and winning their first game, before ultimately losing to the future champion Archers Lacrosse Club (14–6) in the semifinals.

=== 2024 ===
In the 2024 Premier Lacrosse League (PLL) season, Rob Pannell continued to demonstrate his prowess as a dynamic attackman for the California Redwoods. Over the course of 10 games, Pannell amassed 30 points, evenly split between 15 goals and 15 assists, showcasing his balanced offensive capabilities.

Despite his efforts, the Redwoods fell short of a playoff berth for the second time in four years. Pannell entered free agency at the season's end, eventually singing with the Maryland Whipsnakes.

== International career ==
Pannell was a member of 2014 Team USA that won silver at the World Championships in Denver. Pannell was named the World's Most Outstanding Attackman and he was named to the All-World team. Pannell led the World Championships in scoring with 17 goals and 15 assists for a total of 32 points. His total points are second all-time in the Team USA scoring books for points in a tournament, tying him with Mikey Powell and nine points behind Mark Millon's record of 42 points. Pannell also had seven goals in USA's game against the Iroquois, good for second all-time for most goals scored in a game by a member of Team USA.

During January 2018, Pannell officially was named to the USA Men's Lacrosse team that competed at the World Games in Israel during July. At the games, Pannell helped Team USA bring home the gold medal, assisting Tom Schreiber for the game-winning goal in a 9–8 victory over Canada with less than one second remaining in the game. Pannell tallied 10 goals and 11 assists for 21 points during the games and was named to the All-World Team for the second time.

== Personal ==
During 2016, Pannell signed a five-year deal with New Balance/Warrior to be the lacrosse player image associated with its new Warp stick technology. He also is sponsored by Roar Beverage Co. and One Brands.

During 2018, Pannell formed the Attack Academy (theattackacademy.com) that focuses on offensive skill development for youth players through camps, clinics and small group training sessions across the country.

As of May 2019, Pannell also began a career as an insurance broker for the Whitmore Agency in Garden City, New York.

Pannell is the middle child of Susan and Bob Pannell. He has an older sister, Genevieve, and a younger brother, James, who plays for the Atlas Lacrosse Club in the PLL.

Pannell's father, Robert, played baseball and football at Brown. His uncle, Jim Metzger, is a former Half Hollow Hills High School and Hofstra University All-American lacrosse player for whom the Men's and Women's Lacrosse offices at Hofstra are named.

== Statistics ==
=== NCAA ===
| Cornell | GP | G | A | Pts | PPG |
|---|---|---|---|---|---|
| 2009 | 17 | 25 | 42 | 67 | 3.9 |
| 2010 | 18 | 29 | 51 | 80 | 4.4 |
| 2011 | 17 | 42 | 47 | 89 | 5.2 |
| 2012 | 2 | 7 | 9 | 16 | 8.0 |
| 2013 | 18 | 47 | 55 | 102 ^{(a)} | 5.7 |
| Totals | 72 | 150 | 204 ^{(b)} | 354 ^{(c)} | 4.7 |

^{(a)} 13th in NCAA Division I single season points
^{(b)} 5th in career assists
^{(c)} 7th in career points

=== MLL ===
| Season | Team | Regular season | | | | | | | | | | | Playoffs | | | | | | | | | | |
| Season | Team | GP | G | 2PG | A | Pts | Sh | GB | Pen | PIM | FOW | FOA | GP | G | 2PG | A | Pts | Sh | GB | Pen | PIM | FOW | FOA |
|---|---|---|---|---|---|---|---|---|---|---|---|---|---|---|---|---|---|---|---|---|---|---|---|
| 2013 | Lizards | 10 | 25 | 0 | 17 | 42 | 107 | 18 | 0 | 1 | 0 | 0 | – | – | – | – | – | – | – | – | – | – | – |
| 2014 | Lizards | 13 | 33 | 0 | 23 | 56 | 68 | 16 | 0 | 0 | 0 | 0 | 1 | 2 | 0 | 1 | 3 | 10 | 1 | 0 | 0 | 0 | 0 |
| 2015 | Lizards | 14 | 38 | 0 | 30 | 68 | 145 | 24 | 0 | 1 | 0 | 0 | 2 | 6 | 0 | 3 | 9 | 18 | 2 | 0 | 0 | 0 | 0 |
| 2016 | Lizards | 14 | 42 | 0 | 32 | 74 | 153 | 28 | 0 | 1 | 0 | 0 | 1 | 2 | 0 | 3 | 5 | 7 | 1 | 0 | 0 | 0 | 0 |
| 2017 | Lizards | 11 | 23 | 0 | 26 | 49 | 73 | 15 | 0 | 7 | 0 | 0 | – | – | – | – | – | – | – | – | – | – | – |
| 2018 | Lizards | 13 | 43 | 0 | 35 | 78 | 108 | 24 | 0 | 0 | 0 | 0 | 1 | 3 | 0 | 2 | 5 | 7 | 3 | 0 | 0 | 0 | 0 |
| 2019 | Lizards | 16 | 32 | 1 | 29 | 62 | 155 | 43 | 2 | 2 | 0 | 0 | – | – | – | – | – | – | – | – | – | – | – |
| | | 91 | 236 | 1 | 192 | 429 | 809 | 168 | 2 | 12 | 0 | 0 | 5 | 13 | 0 | 9 | 22 | 35 | 7 | 0 | 0 | 0 | 0 |
| Career total: | | 96 | 249 | 1 | 201 | 451 | 844 | 175 | 2 | 12 | 0 | 0 | | | | | | | | | | | |

GP–Games played; G–Goals; 2PG–2-point goals; A–Assists; Pts–Points; Sh–Shots; GB–Ground balls; Pen–Penalties; PIM–Penalty minutes; FOW–Faceoffs won; FOA–Faceoffs attempted

- ^{(2018)} 1st in MLL single season points

=== PLL ===
| Season | Team | Regular season | | | | | | | | | | | Playoffs | | | | | | | | | | |
| Season | Team | GP | G | 2PG | A | Pts | Sh | GB | Pen | PIM | FOW | FOA | GP | G | 2PG | A | Pts | Sh | GB | Pen | PIM | FOW | FOA |
|---|---|---|---|---|---|---|---|---|---|---|---|---|---|---|---|---|---|---|---|---|---|---|---|
| 2020 | Atlas | 5 | 6 | 0 | 9 | 15 | 34 | 14 | 0 | 0 | 0 | 0 | – | – | – | – | – | – | – | – | – | – | – |
| 2021 | Redwoods | 9 | 13 | 0 | 16 | 29 | 68 | 16 | 3 | 1.5 | 0 | 0 | 1 | 2 | 0 | 2 | 4 | 5 | 2 | 0 | 0 | 0 | 0 |
| 2022 | Redwoods | 10 | 16 | 0 | 22 | 38 | 49 | 12 | 0 | 0 | 0 | 0 | 1 | 3 | 0 | 0 | 3 | 6 | 1 | 0 | 0 | 0 | 0 |
| 2023 | Redwoods | 10 | 15 | 0 | 19 | 34 | 68 | 24 | 2 | 1 | 0 | 0 | 2 | 2 | 1 | 3 | 6 | 15 | 3 | 0 | 0 | 0 | 0 |
| 2024 | Redwoods | 10 | 15 | 0 | 15 | 30 | 74 | 21 | 2 | 1 | 0 | 0 | – | – | – | – | – | – | – | – | – | – | – |
| 2025 | Whipsnakes | 8 | 7 | 0 | 13 | 20 | 42 | 10 | 1 | 0.5 | 0 | 0 | 1 | 2 | 0 | 2 | 4 | 4 | 1 | 0 | 0 | 0 | 0 |
| 2026 | Whipsnakes | 12 | 15 | 0 | 19 | 34 | 69 | 20 | 2 | 1.5 | 0 | 0 | 1 | 1 | 0 | 1 | 2 | 5 | 2 | 0 | 0 | 0 | 0 |
| | | 64 | 87 | 0 | 113 | 200 | 404 | 117 | 10 | 5.5 | 0 | 0 | 6 | 10 | 1 | 8 | 19 | 31 | 9 | 0 | 0 | 0 | 0 |
| Career total: | | 70 | 97 | 1 | 121 | 219 | 435 | 126 | 10 | 5.5 | 0 | 0 | | | | | | | | | | | |

GP–Games played; G–Goals; 2PG–2-point goals; A–Assists; Pts–Points; Sh–Shots; GB–Ground balls; Pen–Penalties; PIM–Penalty minutes; FOW–Faceoffs won; FOA–Faceoffs attempted

=== International ===
| International | GP | G | A | Pts | PPG |
|---|---|---|---|---|---|
| 2014 | 7 | 17 | 15 | 32 | 4.57 |
| 2018 | 7 | 10 | 11 | 21 | 3.0 |

== See also ==
- 2009 NCAA Division I Men's Lacrosse Championship
- 2013 NCAA Division I Men's Lacrosse Championship
- College Lacrosse Awards
- Cornell Big Red men's lacrosse
