= John Zulberti =

American lacrosse player (1967–2021)

Personal information
- Nationality: American
- Born: January 20, 1967
- Died: August 1, 2021 (aged 54) Sandy Springs, Georgia, U.S.
- Height: 5 ft 9 in (175 cm)
- Weight: 180 lb (82 kg; 12 st 12 lb)

Sport
- Position: Attack, Forward
- Shoots: Right
- NLL teams: Buffalo Bandits
- NCAA team: Syracuse University

John F. Zulberti (January 20, 1967 – August 1, 2021) was an American four-time All-American NCAA lacrosse player at Syracuse University from 1986 to 1989. The Orange won the NCAA Men's Lacrosse Championships in 1988 and 1989 with Zulberti teaming up with perennial all-timers Gary Gait, Paul Gait, and Tom Marechek. He drowned at the age of 54 in August 2021.

== Syracuse Orange ==
In the 1988 championship, Zulberti teamed with high scoring teammates the Gait brothers and Tom Marechek to lead the Orange to a 13-8 win over Cornell. These same four offensive leaders again teamed up to win the 1989 championship 13 to 12 over Johns Hopkins.

Zulberti was named the Jack Turnbull Award winner as the nation's top attackman in 1988 and 1989. He is among the all-time leaders in NCAA scoring, is 6th all-time on the Syracuse scoring list, and even ranks among the all-time point getters in New York Public School history.

== MILL ==
John played professionally in the Major Indoor Lacrosse League for the Buffalo Bandits, playing in their inaugural season of 1992 and again teaming with Marechek to win a championship.

== West Genesee ==
Like fellow Syracuse alum Brad Kotz, Zulberti played high school lacrosse at powerful West Genesee High School, where he had 361 career points. In his junior and senior years at West Genesee, Zulberti had 129 and 139 points, respectively.

=== Syracuse University ===
Season	GP	G	A	Pts	PPG
1986	17	33	41	74	4.35
1987	13	24	22	46	3.54
1988	15	22	47	69	4.6
1989	15	30	48	78	5.2
Totals	60	109	158(a)	267(b)	4.45

^{(a)} 12th in NCAA Men's Division I all-time Assists
^{(b)} 19th in NCAA Men's Division I all-time Total Points

== See also ==
- 1988 NCAA Division I Men's Lacrosse Championship
- 1989 NCAA Division I Men's Lacrosse Championship
- Syracuse athletes
- Syracuse Orange men's lacrosse
