= Sal LoCascio =

American lacrosse player and coach

Personal information
- Nationality: American
- Born: April 6, 1967 (age 59) Lindenhurst, New York, U.S.
- Height: 5 ft 11 in (180 cm)

Sport
- Position: Field Lacrosse Goaltender, Box Lacrosse Goaltender
- NLL teams: New York Saints
- MLL teams: Long Island Lizards
- NCAA team: University of Massachusetts
- Pro career: 1990–2001

Sal LoCascio (born April 6, 1967) is an American former professional lacrosse goaltender and coach who played the majority of his career for the New York Saints of the National Lacrosse League. He also played one season with the Long Island Lizards of Major League Lacrosse, and later served as the head coach of the MLL's Bridgeport/Philadelphia Barrage.

== Playing career ==
University of Massachusetts Amherst (1985 - 1989) From 1985 to 1989, LoCascio played for University of Massachusetts Amherst. He set the record for the most saves by any NCAA goalie in 1987, with 271 saves. LoCascio graduated in 1989, and was a four-time All-American. In the 1989 NCAA Quarterfinals against Johns Hopkins, LoCascio recorded 26 saves. In 2000, he was elected to the UMass Athletic Hall of Fame.

=== New York Saints ===
LoCascio signed with the New York Saints of the National Lacrosse League as an undrafted free agent in 1990. He played 10 seasons with the Saints, and served as their starting goaltender from 1992 to 2000. LoCascio was named all-pro five times, in 1991, 1992, 1993, 1994, and 1997.

=== Team USA ===
LoCascio backstopped Team USA in the World Lacrosse Championship in 1990, 1994, and 1998, winning gold medals on all three occasions.

== Post-playing career ==
After his playing career ended LoCascio served as head coach of the Bridgeport/Philadelphia Barrage of Major League Lacrosse for three seasons. He coached them to the Steinfeld Cup and won the Major League Lacrosse Coach of the Year Award in his third and final season with the team in 2004.

LoCascio currently resides in Bayport, NY.

== Awards ==
In 2004, LoCascio was awarded the Major League Lacrosse Coach of the Year Award. He was also inducted into U.S. National Lacrosse Hall of Fame the same year. In February 2008, LoCascio was inducted into the National Lacrosse League Hall of Fame.

| Preceded by Ted Georgalas | Major League Lacrosse Coach of the Year Award; 2004 | Succeeded by Scott Hiller |

== Statistics ==
=== NLL ===
| | | Regular Season | | | | | | Playoffs |
| Season | Team | GP | Min | GA | SV | GAA | SV% | GP | Min | GA | SV | GAA | SV% |
|---|---|---|---|---|---|---|---|---|---|---|---|---|---|
| 1990 | New York | 7 | - | - | - | - | - | 1 | - | - | - | - | - |
| 1991 | New York | 10 | - | - | - | - | - | - | - | - | - | - | - |
| 1992 | New York | 8 | 480 | 101 | 219 | 12.63 | 68.44% | 1 | 59 | 7 | 41 | 7.12 | 85.42% |
| 1993 | New York | 8 | 479 | 96 | 319 | 12.03 | 76.87% | 2 | 90 | 19 | 51 | 12.67 | 72.86% |
| 1994 | New York | 8 | 473 | 98 | 300 | 12.43 | 75.38% | 1 | 58 | 17 | 40 | 17.59 | 70.18% |
| 1995 | New York | 8 | 430 | 86 | 299 | 12.00 | 77.66% | - | - | - | - | - | - |
| 1996 | New York | 10 | 568 | 136 | 291 | 14.37 | 68.15% | - | - | - | - | - | - |
| 1997 | New York | 10 | 546 | 111 | 324 | 12.19 | 74.48% | 1 | 37 | 12 | 27 | 19.70 | 69.23% |
| 1998 | New York | 7 | 298 | 60 | 143 | 12.08 | 70.44% | - | - | - | - | - | - |
| 1999 | New York | 11 | 561 | 123 | 343 | 13.16 | 73.61% | - | - | - | - | - | - |
| 2000 | New York | 2 | 67 | 21 | 46 | 18.67 | 68.66% | - | - | - | - | - | - |
| NLL totals | | 59 | 2430 | 517 | 1428 | 12.63 | 68.44% | 5 | 207 | 43 | 132 | 13.55 | 74.30% |

=== NLL head coaching statistics ===
| Team | Season | Regular Season | | | | Playoffs | | | | Playoff result |
| Team | Season | GC | W | L | W% | GC | W | L | W% | Playoff result |
|---|---|---|---|---|---|---|---|---|---|---|
| New York Saints | 2001 | 14 | 6 | 8 | .429 | – | – | – | – | Did not qualify |
| New York Saints | 2002 | 16 | 5 | 11 | .313 | – | – | – | – | Did not qualify |
| Totals: | 2 | 30 | 11 | 19 | .367 | – | – | – | – | |

=== MLL ===
| | | Regular Season | | | | | | | Playoffs |
| Year | Team | GP | Min | GA | GAA | Sv | SvPct | 2ptGA | GP | Min | GA | GAA | Sv | SvPct | 2ptGA |
|---|---|---|---|---|---|---|---|---|---|---|---|---|---|---|---|
| 2001 | Long Island | 9 | 426 | 92 | 12.95 | 121 | 56.8% | 3 | 2 | 125 | 23 | 11.04 | 34 | 59.6% | 0 |
| MLL Totals | | 9 | 426 | 92 | 12.95 | 121 | 56.8% | 3 | 2 | 125 | 23 | 11.04 | 34 | 59.6% | 0 |
