= Tewaaraton Award =

American college lacrosse award

The Tewaaraton Award
- Awarded for: To honor the most outstanding male and female collegiate players, and to recognize the Native American heritage of the sport of lacrosse
- Presented by: University Club of Washington, D.C., Tewaaraton Foundation
- First award: 2001
- Currently held by: Shawn Lyght, Madison Taylor
- Website: www.tewaaraton.com

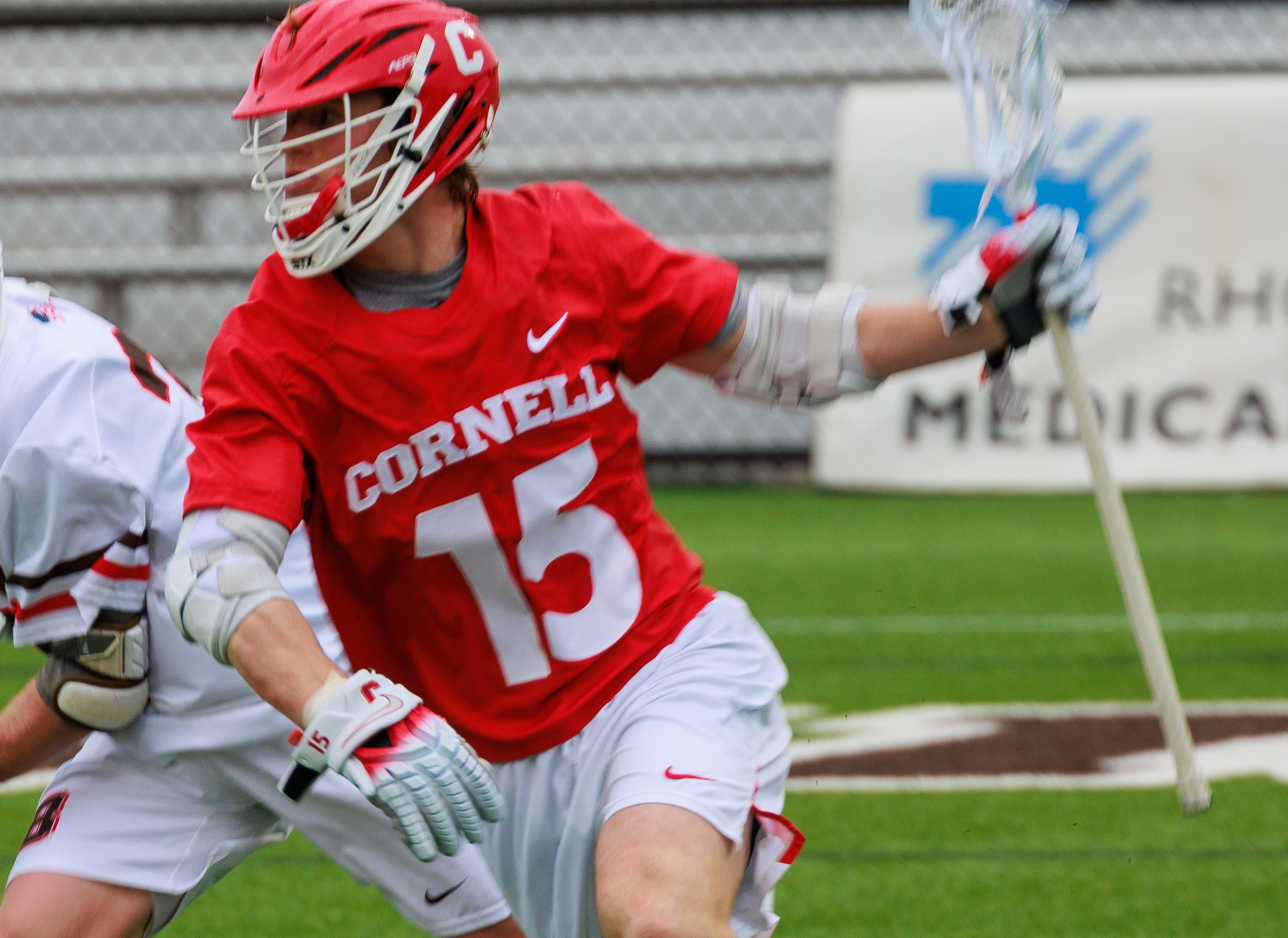
Cornell's CJ Kirst

The Tewaaraton Award is an annual award for the most outstanding American college lacrosse men's and women's players, since 2001. It is the lacrosse equivalent of football's Heisman Trophy. The award is presented by The Tewaaraton Foundation and the University Club of Washington, D.C.

Lacrosse is the oldest sport played in North America and the award honors the Native American heritage of lacrosse in the name of its award, "Tewaaraton," the Mohawk name for their game and the progenitor of present-day lacrosse. The Tewaaraton Award has received the endorsement of the Mohawk Nation Council of Elders. Each year, the award recognizes one of the Six Nations of the Haudenosaunee Confederacy: the Mohawk, Cayuga, Oneida, Onondaga, Seneca and Tuscarora tribes.

== Trophy ==
The award winners each receive a trophy of a bronze sculpture depicting a Mohawk native playing lacrosse. It was designed and created by Frederick Kail with the assistance of Thomas Vennum, Jr., a Native American lacrosse historian and author.

Replicas of the trophy are given to the winners each year. The original castings of the trophy are part of a permanent collection and are currently on display at the University Club of Washington, D.C.

== Nomination and selection process ==
Players are nominated for the award by coaches, and winners chosen by selection committees made up of coaches.

In addition to recognizing the top men’s and women’s collegiate lacrosse players, the Tewaaraton Award in the past has also recognized the High School All-Tewaaraton team for both boys and girls lacrosse. This was a regional team which was composed of the best players from both private and public schools in the Maryland, Washington, D.C., and Virginia area. However, no such list has been released since 2010, and there is no mention of it on either the Tewaraaton Awards website nor the University Club of Washington, D.C.'s website.

== Ceremony ==
Each year the ceremony takes place at the National Museum of the American Indian. Anyone can purchase a ticket to attend the ceremony.

== USILA versus Tewaaraton ==
There is debate in the lacrosse community as to whether the Tewaaraton Award is an outstanding player award or whether it should be called a postseason award. The controversy stems from the fact that the award is usually given to a male player who plays well during the season-ending NCAA tournament and from a team which is the winner or runner up in the NCAA Tournament. The Lt. Raymond Enners Award is the USILA Outstanding Player of the Year Award selected by the NCAA coaches, and the Tewaaraton Award recipient was not the same as the Raymond Enners Award recipient in 5 out of the first 11 years that the Tewaaraton was awarded. Since then, the two awards have agreed almost exactly; in each season but one from 2012 through 2022, both awards were won by the same individual. The only exception in this span was in 2014, when the Enners Award went to one of the two brothers who shared the Tewaaraton Award.

== Tewaaraton Award recipients ==
Year	Men's winner	School	Position	Women's winner	School	Position
2001	Doug Shanahan	Hofstra	Midfield	Jen Adams	Maryland	Attack
2002	Mike Powell	Syracuse	Attack	Erin Elbe	Georgetown	Attack
2003	Chris Rotelli	Virginia	Midfield	Rachael Becker	Princeton	Defense
2004	Mike Powell	Syracuse	Attack	Amy Appelt	Virginia	Attack
2005	Kyle Harrison	Johns Hopkins	Midfield	Katie Chrest	Duke	Attack
2006	Matt Ward	Virginia	Attack	Kristen Kjellman	Northwestern	Midfield
2007	Matt Danowski	Duke	Attack	Kristen Kjellman	Northwestern	Midfield
2008	Mike Leveille	Syracuse	Attack	Hannah Nielsen	Northwestern	Midfield
2009	Max Seibald	Cornell	Midfield	Hannah Nielsen	Northwestern	Midfield
2010	Ned Crotty	Duke	Attack	Caitlyn McFadden	Maryland	Midfield
2011	Steele Stanwick	Virginia	Attack	Shannon Smith	Northwestern	Attack
2012	Peter Baum	Colgate	Attack	Katie Schwarzmann	Maryland	Midfield
2013	Rob Pannell	Cornell	Attack	Katie Schwarzmann	Maryland	Midfield
2014	Lyle Thompson	Albany	Attack	Taylor Cummings	Maryland	Midfield
2014	Miles Thompson	Albany	Attack	Taylor Cummings	Maryland	Midfield
2015	Lyle Thompson	Albany	Attack	Taylor Cummings	Maryland	Midfield
2016	Dylan Molloy	Brown	Attack	Taylor Cummings	Maryland	Midfield
2017	Matt Rambo	Maryland	Attack	Zoe Stukenberg	Maryland	Midfield
2018	Ben Reeves	Yale	Attack	Sam Apuzzo	Boston College	Attack
2019	Pat Spencer	Loyola	Attack	Megan Taylor	Maryland	Goalie
2020	No Awards Due to COVID-19					
2021	Jared Bernhardt	Maryland	Attack	Charlotte North	Boston College	Attack
2022	Logan Wisnauskas	Maryland	Attack	Charlotte North	Boston College	Attack
2023	Brennan O'Neill	Duke	Attack	Izzy Scane	Northwestern	Attack
2024	Pat Kavanagh	Notre Dame	Attack	Izzy Scane	Northwestern	Attack
2025	CJ Kirst	Cornell	Attack	Chloe Humphrey	North Carolina	Attack
2026	Shawn Lyght	Notre Dame	Defense	Madison Taylor	Northwestern	Attack

=== Men's awards by university ===
Rank	School	Number of Awards	Winning years
T-1	Cornell	3	2009, 2013, 2025
T-1	Duke	3	2007, 2010, 2023
T-1	Maryland	3	2017, 2021, 2022
T-1	Virginia	3	2003, 2006, 2011
T-1	Syracuse	3	2002, 2004, 2008
T-6	Albany	2	2014 (2x), 2015
T-6	Notre Dame	2	2024, 2026
T-8	Loyola (MD)	1	2019
T-8	Yale	1	2018
T-8	Brown	1	2016
T-8	Colgate	1	2012
T-8	Johns Hopkins	1	2005
T-8	Hofstra	1	2001

=== Women's awards by university ===
Rank	School	Number of Awards	Winning years
1	Maryland	9	2001, 2010, 2012, 2013, 2014, 2015, 2016, 2017, 2019
2	Northwestern	8	2006, 2007, 2008, 2009, 2011, 2023, 2024, 2026
3	Boston College	3	2018, 2021, 2022
T-4	North Carolina	1	2025
T-4	Duke	1	2005
T-4	Virginia	1	2004
T-4	Princeton	1	2003
T-4	Georgetown	1	2002

== Notable achievements ==
- 2014 was the first year that the award was given to a Native American player. It is also the first, and so far only, time the award has been given to two players to share: Lyle Thompson and Miles Thompson, who are both part of the Onondaga Nation, won the award that year.
- In 2016, Taylor Cummings became the first and so far only three-time recipient of the award.

== Tewaaraton Legend Award ==
Since 2011, the Tewaaraton Legend Award has been presented to one recipient each year who played collegiately prior to 2001 when the first Tewaaraton Award was presented, whose performance during their college years would have earned them a Tewaaraton Award had the award existed when they played. All awardees received the Enners Award when they played except for Jim Brown and Jimmy Lewis whose playing days preceded the first Enners Award in 1969. In 2016, the foundation began presenting both a men's and women's Legend Award.

Tewaaraton Legend Award Recipients
Year	Men's Winner	School	Women's Winner	School
2011	Jim Brown	Syracuse	-	-
2012	Eamon McEneaney	Cornell	-	-
2013	Joe Cowan	Johns Hopkins	-	-
2014	Jimmy Lewis	Navy	-	-
2015	Brad Kotz	Syracuse	-	-
2016	Frank Urso	Maryland	Candace Finn Rocha	Penn State
2017	Peter Cramblet	Army	Cherie Greer Brown	Virginia
2018	Larry Quinn	Johns Hopkins	Amanda Moore O'Leary	Temple
2019	Tom Sears	North Carolina	Kare Emas Borbee	Delaware
2020	No Awards due to COVID 19			
2021	No Awards due to COVID 19			
2022	Dave Pietramala	Johns Hopkins	Kelly Amonte Hiller	Maryland
2023	Doug Schreiber	Maryland	Kathleen Geiger	Temple
2024	Bill Miller	Hobart	Francesca DenHartog	Harvard
2025	Gary & Paul Gait	Syracuse	None	
2026	Mike French	Cornell	None	

=== Legends awards by university ===
Rank	School	Number of Awards	Winning years
T-1	Johns Hopkins	3	2013, 2018, 2022
T-1	Maryland	3	2016, 2022, 2023
T-1	Syracuse	3	2011, 2015, 2025
T-4	Temple	2	2018, 2023
T-4	Cornell	2	2012, 2026
T-6	Navy	1	2014
T-6	Penn State	1	2016
T-6	Army	1	2017
T-6	Virginia	1	2017
T-6	North Carolina	1	2019
T-6	Delaware	1	2019
T-6	Hobart	1	2024
T-6	Harvard	1	2024

== Spirit of Tewaaraton ==
The Spirit of Tewaaraton is presented each year to an individual who has contributed to the sport of lacrosse in a way that reflects the spirit of the values and the mission of the Tewaaraton award. The award was first presented in 2003. Although there have been some years it was not presented, it has been presented each year since 2012 with the exceptions of 2020 and 2021.

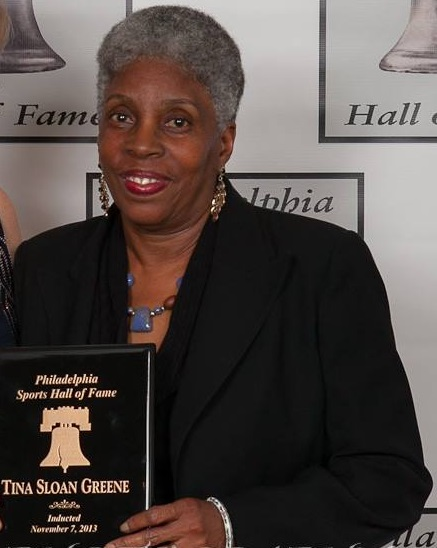
Tina Sloan Green awarded in 2016

Spirit of Tewaaraton Winners
Year	Winner
2003	A.B. “Buzzy” Krongard
2003	Diane M. Geppi-Aikens
2005	Sid Jamieson
2009	Roy D. Simmons, Jr.
2010	Dick Edell
2012	Richie Moran
2013	Bob Scott
2014	Brendan Looney
2015	Chief Oren Lyons
2016	Tina Sloan Green
2017	George Boiardi
2018	Welles Crowther
2019	Ethel “Feffie” Barnhill
2022	Bill Belichick
2023	Alfred "Alf" Jacques
2024	Chris Sailer
2025	Paul Rabil, Mike Rabil
2026	Jack Emmer

== Native American Scholarship Program ==
Since 2006, The Tewaaraton Foundation has given over $130,000 in scholarships to Native American high school lacrosse players through its Tewaaraton Native American Scholarships program. The $10,000 scholarships are awarded annually on a highly competitive basis to one Native American female and one Native American male lacrosse player who are enrolled members of a U.S. tribe. All awards are not only based on the student's athletic performance, but also on their merit, academic achievement, and ambition.

Tewaaraton Native American Scholarship Recipients
Year	Boys' Winner	Nation	Girls' Winner	Nation
2006	Justin Gill	Oglala Sioux and Seneca Nation of Indians	Lindsey Steeprock	Mohawk Nation
2007	Alexander Jamieson	Seneca Nation of Indians, Wolf Clan	Mia McKie	Tuscarora Indian Nation, Turtle Clan
2008	Emmett Printup	Tonawanda Seneca	Corinne Abrams	Tuscarora Indian Nation
2009	Isaac "Ike" Hopper	Onondaga Nation	Trenna Hill	Mohawk Nation
2010	Kyle Henry	Tuscarora Indian Nation, White Bear Clan	Taylor Hummel	Tuscarora Indian Nation, White Bear Clan
2011	Christopher White	Oneida Nation	Kristiana Ferguson	Tuscarora Indian Nation
2012	Bradley Thomas	Tuscarora Indian Nation	Marissa Haring	Seneca Nation of Indians
2013	Robert McMicking	Cayuga Nation, Wolf Clan	Cassandra Minerd	Onondaga Nation, Eel Clan
2014	Kason Tarbell	St. Regis Mohawk Tribe	Alie Jimerson	Cayuga Nation, Bear Clan
2015	Chaunce Hill	Six Nations Seneca, Turtle Clan	Lynnzee Miller	Mohawk Nation, Wolf Clan
2016	Emerson Shenandoah	Mohawk Nation, Snipe Clan	Jade Haumann	Seneca Nation of Indians, Wolf Clan
2017	Liam Anderson	Tuscarora Indian Nation, Turtle Clan	Shayla Scanlan	Seneca Nation of Indians, Wolf Clan
2018	Lyle Warrior	Seneca Nation of Indians	Ivy Santana	Seneca Nation, Wolf Clan
2019	Isaiah Cree	Akwesasne Mohawk, Wolf Clan	Jacelyn and Mirabella Lazore	Akwesasne Mohawk, Wolf Clan
2020	Cobie Cree	Mohawk Nation, Bear Clan	Yanenowi Logan	Seneca Nation, Deer Clan
2021	Peter Thais	Mohawk Nation, Wolf Clan	Fantasy Jimerson-Kenjockety	Seneca Nation, Beaver Clan
2022	Crayton Cree	Akwesasne Mohawk Nation, Bear Clan	Savannah Swamp	Akwesasne Mohawk Nation, Bear Clan
2023	Vernon Cooke	Onondaga Beaver Clan	Wynter Jock	Akwesasne Mohawk, Wolf Clan and St. Regis Mohawk Tribe
2024	Brett Bucktooth Jr.	Akwesasne Mohawk, Wolf Clan	Avery Doran	St. Regis Mohawk Tribe, Bear Clan
2025	Winter Rivera	Wolf Clan, Seneca Nation of Indians	Jianna Lazore	Wolf Clan, Akwesasne Mohawk Nation

== See also ==
- Lt. Raymond Enners Outstanding Player Award
- Jack Turnbull Outstanding Attackman Award
- Lt. j.g. Donald MacLaughlin Jr. Outstanding Midfielder Award
- William C. Schmeisser Outstanding Defender Award
- Ensign C. Markland Kelly Jr. Outstanding Goaltender Award
- F. Morris Touchstone Outstanding Coach Award
