= Steele Stanwick =

American lacrosse player (born 1989)

Personal information
- Nationality: American
- Born: September 12, 1989 (age 37) Baltimore, Maryland, U.S.
- Height: 6 ft 0 in (183 cm)
- Weight: 180 lb (82 kg; 12 st 12 lb)

Sport
- Position: Attack
- Shoots: Right
- NCAA team: Virginia (2012)
- MLL draft: 2nd overall, 2012; Ohio Machine
- MLL teams: Ohio Machine; Chesapeake Bayhawks
- Pro career: 2012–2019

Career highlights
- 2011 NCAA Division I Men's Lacrosse Championship; 2011 Division I Player of the Year; 2012 Division I Attackman of the Year; 2 Time MLL All-Star (2012, 2013); 2019 MLL Championship MVP

Steele Stanwick (born September 12, 1989) is an American former professional lacrosse player who played for the Ohio Machine and Chesapeake Bayhawks of Major League Lacrosse. He played his NCAA Division I career at the University of Virginia. He won the Tewaaraton Trophy and the Jack Turnbull Award.

== Family ==
Stanwick was the fifth of eight children born into a lacrosse family, the son of Wells Sr. and Dori Stanwick. His grandfather, Tad, played at St. John's College and wrote a book on the game. All seven of his siblings played Division I lacrosse, and there was at least one Stanwick playing college lacrosse every year from 1998 to 2018. His oldest sister, Sheehan, was a 4x All-American at Georgetown, holding their career record for points, and is currently a lacrosse analyst. His other two older sisters, Wick and Coco, also played at Georgetown. His older brother, Tad, played at Rutgers, serving as a team captain. His younger brother, Wells Jr., was an All-American at Johns Hopkins, finishing his career second in school history in assists. Younger sister Covie attended Boston College, graduating as the school's all-time leading scorer, and youngest brother, Shack, played at Johns Hopkins. All siblings except for Tad were multi-time All-Americans.

== College career ==
Prior to joining the Cavaliers, Steele attended and played lacrosse at Loyola Blakefield in Towson, Maryland, where he led the team to the MIAA championship, recording 37 goals and 35 assists. A highly rated prospect coming out of high school, Steele was selected by Inside Lacrosse as the 2008 #1 high school player in the country.

In his first year at Virginia, Steele was named ACC Rookie of the Year after setting a points record for UVA freshmen with 58 points (36 goals, 22 assists). In his second year, he improved his total with 29 goals and 32 assists for 61 points, which was fifth amongst all ACC players that year. That year, Steele was named a Second-Team All-American. In 2011, he scored 32 goals and completed 38 assists, including an unprecedented 20 points over a three-game stretch in the NCAA tournament, leading the Cavaliers to their fifth NCAA championship. Steele was named a First-Team All-American and won the Tewaaraton Trophy as the nation's best college lacrosse player. He was Virginia's third Tewaaraton winner following Chris Rotelli in 2003 and Matt Ward in 2006.

Virginia was 56 and 14 in Stanwick's four years there, with three straight trips to the final four as well as one national title.

== MLL career ==
He was drafted 2nd overall in the 2012 MLL Collegiate Draft by the Ohio Machine. During the 2012 MLL season, he played in 9 games for the Machine and led all rookies in assists with 17. In September 2017 he was traded to the Chesapeake Bayhawks. Stanwick scored the game-winner in overtime to send the Chesapeake Bayhawks to the 2019 MLL championship game. He then guided the Bayhawks to their 6th MLL title and was named the MVP of the championship final, scoring two goals and an assist. This was Stanwick's only MLL title. Today, Stanwick is an assistant coach to the Johns Hopkins Women's Lacrosse Squad.

== Statistics ==
=== University of Virginia ===
Season	GP	G	A	Pts	PPG
2012	16	29	51	80	5.00
2011	17	32	38	70	4.12
2010	18	29	32	61	3.39
2009	18	36	22	58	3.22
Totals	69	126	143	269	3.90

=== Major League Lacrosse ===
Season	Team	Regular season											Playoffs										
Season	Team	GP	G	2PG	A	Pts	Sh	GB	Pen	PIM	FOW	FOA	GP	G	2PG	A	Pts	Sh	GB	Pen	PIM	FOW	FOA
2012	Ohio Machine	9	11	0	17	28	31	6	0	2	0	0	–	–	–	–	–	–	–	–	–	–	–
2013	Ohio Machine	14	12	0	20	32	32	8	0	1	0	0	–	–	–	–	–	–	–	–	–	–	–
2014	Ohio Machine	11	13	0	23	36	29	11	0	2	0	0	1	1	0	1	2	3	0	0	0	0	0
2015	Ohio Machine	12	14	0	30	44	40	7	0	0	0	0	1	0	0	0	0	0	1	0	0	0	0
2016	Ohio Machine	12	15	0	22	37	48	16	0	0	0	0	2	5	0	5	10	10	1	0	0	0	0
2018	Chesapeake Bayhawks	10	19	0	7	26	42	15	0	3.5	0	0	–	–	–	–	–	–	–	–	–	–	–
2019	Chesapeake Bayhawks	15	23	0	27	50	56	19	0	1	0	0	–	–	–	–	–	–	–	–	–	–	–
		83	107	0	146	253	278	82	0	9.5	0	0	4	6	0	6	12	13	2	0	0	0	0
Career total:		87	113	0	152	265	291	84	0	9.5	0	0											

GP–Games played; G–Goals; 2PG–2-point goals; A–Assists; Pts–Points; Sh–Shots; GB–Ground balls; Pen–Penalties; PIM–Penalty minutes; FOW–Faceoffs won; FOA–Faceoffs attempted

== See also ==
- Virginia Cavaliers men's lacrosse

== Awards ==
Major League Lacrosse

- Major League Lacrosse Championship MVP (2019)

University of Virginia

- Tewaaraton Trophy (2011)
- Jack Turnbull Award (2012)
- Three-time USILA All-American (2010, 2011, 2012)
- Atlantic Coast Conference Offensive Player of the Year (2012)
- Atlantic Coast Conference Player of the Year (2011)
- Atlantic Coast Conference Rookie of the Year (2009)

Preceded by Rob Pannell	Jack Turnbull Award; 2012	Succeeded by Lyle Thompson
Preceded by Ned Crotty	Tewaaraton Trophy; 2011	Succeeded by Peter Baum
