= 1989 NCAA Division I men's lacrosse tournament =

- Dates: May 1989
- Teams: 12
- Finals site: Byrd Stadium, College Park, Maryland
- Champions: Syracuse (3rd title)
- Runner-up: Johns Hopkins (14th title game)
- Semifinalists: Maryland (12th Final Four); North Carolina (8th Final Four)
- Winning coach: Roy Simmons Jr. (3rd title)
- MOP: Paul Gait, Syracuse
- Attendance: 23,893 finals 63,836 total
- Top scorer: Paul Gait, Syracuse (16 goals)

The 1989 NCAA Division I lacrosse tournament was the 19th annual tournament hosted by the National Collegiate Athletic Association to determine the team champion of men's college lacrosse among its Division I programs, held at the end of the 1989 NCAA Division I men's lacrosse season.

Syracuse defeated Johns Hopkins in the championship game, 13–12. The final was a battle of #1 versus #2, with both teams coming into the finals with just one loss.

The championship game was played at Byrd Stadium at the University of Maryland in College Park, Maryland, with 23,893 fans in attendance.

== Overview ==
Twelve NCAA Division I college men's lacrosse teams met after having played their way through a regular season, and for some a conference tournament.

This was the second straight national title for Syracuse behind the Gait brothers, Paul and Gary, and John Zulberti. In addition to the Gaits, a number of stars played in this final, including Dave Pietramala, Quint Kessenich, Tom Marechek.

A wild, back and forth, athletic affair, the game was not decided until one final desperation shot by John Dressel with two seconds left. Matt Palumb made the stop and finished the game with 13 saves. Paul Gait had 4 goals and 2 assists for Syracuse. Johns Hopkins got the ball back for a final possession on a tremendous over the head check on Gary Gait by Dave Pietramala, followed by a mad scramble with Hopkins securing the ball with 12 seconds remaining.

== Bracket ==
First Round
8	Navy	12
Penn	11
5	Adelphi	16
Michigan State	10
6	North Carolina	19
Towson State	8
7	Massachusetts	16
Cornell	7

Quarterfinals
1	Syracuse	18
8	Navy	11
4	Maryland	12^{(i)}
5	Adelphi	11
3	Loyola	5
6	North Carolina	12
2	Johns Hopkins	9
7	Massachusetts	4

Semifinals
1	Syracuse	18
4	Maryland	8
6	North Carolina	6
2	Johns Hopkins	10

Final; May 29, 1989
1	Syracuse	13
2	Johns Hopkins	12

^{(i)} one overtime

== Box scores ==
=== Finals ===
Team	1	2	3	4	Total
Syracuse	5	1	3	4	13
Johns Hopkins	4	4	3	1	12
Syracuse scoring – Paul Gait 4, John Zulberti 2, Gary Gait 2, Rodney Dumpson 2, Tom Marechek, Greg Burns, Joe Bonacci; Johns Hopkins scoring – Matt Panetta 5, John Wilkens 2, Mike Morrissey, John Dressel, Greg Kelly, Jay Clarke, Brian Lukacz; Shots: Johns Hopkins 40, Syracuse 39; Saves: Johns Hopkins Quint Kessenich 17, Syracuse Matt Palumb 13; Attendance: 23,893

=== Semifinals ===
Team	1	2	3	4	Total
Syracuse	9	2	3	4	18
Maryland	2	3	2	1	8
Syracuse scoring – Gary Gait 5, Paul Gait 3, Greg Burns 3, Tom Marechek 3, Dan Caughey 2, Rodney Dumpson, John Zulberti; Maryland scoring – Mark Douglas 2, Rob Wurzburger 2, Pat Gugerty, Tim Corcoran, Brian Burlace, David Willard; Shots: Syracuse 55, Maryland 29; Saves: Syracuse – Matt Palumb 10, Jerry DeLorenzo 0; Maryland – Mike McCanna 4, Matt Herrold 7; Attendance: 20,263

Team	1	2	3	4	Total
Johns Hopkins	2	2	2	4	10
North Carolina	3	2	0	1	6
Johns Hopkins scoring – Matt Panetta 3, Mike Morrissey 2, Brian Lukacz, Adam Wright, Jeff Ihm, Greg Kelly, John Wilkens; North Carolina scoring – Dennis Goldstein 3, Neill Redfern, Chip Mayer, Dan Donnelly; Shots: Johns Hopkins 38, North Carolina 28; Saves: North Carolina – Pat Olmert 8; Johns Hopkins – Quint Kessenich 8; Attendance:

=== Quarterfinals ===
Team	1	2	3	4	Total
Syracuse	3	5	4	6	18
Navy	1	0	7	3	11
Syracuse scoring – Greg Burns 4, Tom Marechek 4, Gary Gait 3, John Zulberti 3, Paul Gait 2, Joe Bonacci, Jim Egan.; Navy scoring – Brian Keith 4, Paul Basile 2, John Quinn 2, David Ellison, Dennis Nealon, Tim O’Rourke; Shots: Syracuse 50, Navy 39; Saves: Syracuse – Matt Palumb 21; Navy – Louis Brown 11; Attendance: 4,572

Team	1	2	3	4	OT1	Total
Maryland	3	3	2	3	1	12
Adelphi	2	6	1	2	0	11
Maryland scoring – Rob Wurzburger 4, Mark Douglas 3, Phil Willard 2, Chris Conner 2, Mike Frick; Adelphi scoring – Jeff Reh 4, Dave Reilly 2, Gordon Purdie 2, Mike Muscarella 2, Tom Aiello; Shots: Maryland 41, Adelphi 36; Saves: Adelphi – Jim Cheeseman 12; Maryland – Mike McCanna 6, Matt Herrold 3; Attendance: 2,725

Team	1	2	3	4	Total
North Carolina	1	2	5	4	12
Loyola	2	1	0	2	5
North Carolina scoring – Neill Redfern 4, Michael Thomas 3, Dan Donnelly 2, Dennis Goldstein, David Kelly, John Szczypinski, Lars Pedersen, Joe Breschi; Loyola Maryland scoring – Brian Kroneberger 3, Mike Ruland, Jim Blanding; Shots: North Carolina 48, Loyola Maryland 30; Saves: Loyola Maryland – Charlie Toomey 17, Tim Dunnigan 0; North Carolina – Pat Olmert 12; Attendance: 3,200

Team	1	2	3	4	Total
Johns Hopkins	1	4	2	2	9
Massachusetts	0	3	0	1	4
Johns Hopkins scoring – Jay Clarke 2, Matt Panetta 2, Greg Kelly 2, Brian Lukacz, John Dressel, Brendan Kelly; Massachusetts scoring – Scott Hiller, Rob Codignotto, Tim Soudan, Michael Cain; Shots: Johns Hopkins 52, Massachusetts 31; Saves: Massachusetts – Sal LoCascio 26; North Carolina – Quint Kessenich 14; Attendance: 4,100

=== First round ===
Team	1	2	3	4	Total
Navy	2	4	3	3	12
Penn	2	1	5	3	11
Navy scoring – Brian Keith 4, Mike Herger 3, Paul Basile 2, Dennis Nealon 2, Brian Sullivan 1; Penn scoring – John Dick 2, Stewart Fisher 2, Peter Smith 2, Tom Burns 1, Michael Kelly 1, John Lyons 1, Bill Quill 1, Chris Shoemaker 1; Shots: Penn 54, Navy 43; Saves: Navy Louis Brown 23, Penn Jeremy Sigler 10 - Kevin Lopez 9; Attendance: 2,025

Team	1	2	3	4	Total
Adelphi	4	5	4	3	16
Michigan State	0	1	3	6	11
Adelphi scoring – Tom Aiello 5, Scott Reh 4, Jeff Reh 3, Chris McKeough 1, Gordon Purdie 1, Brad Sahlstrom 1, Paul Vlachos 1; Michigan State scoring – Mike Siegenthaler 3, Wayne Sansiviero 2, Mike Ferguson 1, Rich Montalbano 1, Adam Mueller 1, Brad Smaha 1, Dave Stein 1; Shots: Adelphi 66, Michigan State 39; Saves: Adelphi Jim Cheeseman 18, Michigan State Chris Barber 27; Attendance: 750

Team	1	2	3	4	Total
North Carolina	4	5	6	4	19
Towson State	4	1	1	2	8
North Carolina scoring – David Kelly 5, Neill Redfern 5, John Szczypinski 2, Mark Tummillo 2, Jim Buczek 1, Scott Cox 1, Dan Donnelly 1, Chris Galgano 1, Michael Thomas 1; Towson State scoring – Tony Millon 4, John Blatchley 1, Lindsay Dixon 1, David Shoul 1, Glenn Smith 1; Shots: North Carolina 47, Towson State 39; Saves: North Carolina Pat Olmert 16 - Lars Pedersen 3, Towson David Linthieum 14 - Marc Lamantia 1; Attendance: 392

Team	1	2	3	4	Total
Massachusetts	5	1	5	5	16
Cornell	1	3	1	2	7
Massachusetts scoring – Chris Tyler 5, Paul Ganci 4, Scott Hiller 2, Bill Begien, Michael Cain, Rob Codignotto, John Gonzalez, Tim Soudan; Cornell scoring – Vince Angotti 2, Steve Meyer 2, Todd Adler, Greg Boyce, John Heil; Shots: Massachusetts 48, Cornell 38; Saves: Massachusetts Sal LoCascio 19, Cornell Paul Schimoler 16; Attendance: 2,392

== See also ==
- 1989 NCAA Division I women's lacrosse tournament
- 1989 NCAA Division III men's lacrosse tournament
