= Matt Abbott (lacrosse) =

American lacrosse player (born 1986)

Personal information
- Nationality: American
- Born: September 10, 1986 (age 39) Syracuse, New York, U.S.
- Height: 6 ft 2 in (188 cm)
- Weight: 185 lb (84 kg; 13 st 3 lb)

Sport
- Position: Midfield
- NCAA team: Syracuse (2009)
- NLL draft: 20th overall, 2009; Boston Blazers
- NLL teams: Boston Blazers
- MLL draft: 9th overall, 2009; Washington Bayhawks
- MLL teams: Washington/Chesapeake Bayhawks
- PLL team Former teams: Cannons LC; Whipsnakes LC
- Pro career: 2009–

Matt Abbott (born September 10, 1986) is a professional lacrosse player for Cannons Lacrosse Club in the Premier Lacrosse League. He is a nine time MLL all star and the Bayhawks leader in career games played. Abbott played for the Bayhawks since graduating from Syracuse, where he played lacrosse for four years. He also works as a financial advisor and coaches for Colgate as a volunteer.

== Personal ==
Matthew Joseph Abbott, born in Syracuse, NY, is the son of Tom and Lorie Abbott. Matt is the third member of the Abbott family to play for Syracuse University. His grandfather, Larry Abbott played at SU from 1950 to 1952. His father, Tom Abbott played from 1975 to 1978. His brother Michael played for University of Virginia, where he won a Division I national championship, and for SUNY Cortland, where he won a Division III national championship and is now the assistant offensive coach for Penn.

== High school ==
Abbott played varsity lacrosse at Nottingham High School from eighth grade until his senior year. He totaled 212 career points (131 goals, 81 assists), with 42 goals and 29 assists his senior year. He was named team captain his sophomore, junior and senior year. He played for the 2004 Empire State Games Central Team, and helped them win a gold medal. Freshman Year: He earned honorable mention all-league laurels. Sophomore Year: Named first team all-league and All-CNY honorable mention. He was selected as an alternate for the Empire State Games Central team. Junior Year: First team all-league and first team All-CNY. Named his team's offensive MVP. Senior Year: First team all-league, first team All-CNY and All-American. Named team MVP.

== College career ==
Syracuse University Freshman Year (2006): Played in all 15 games with one start. Made his first career start against Massachusetts. Tallied seven goals and one assist for a total of eight points. Scooped up 11 ground balls and was 1-for-5 on faceoff opportunities. Netted two points on a season-high two goals in his first collegiate contest versus Army. Scored one goal versus Hobart, Loyola, Massachusetts, at Colgate and against Virginia in the NCAA semifinals. Registered his first career assist in the NCAA quarterfinals against Johns Hopkins. Member of the Athletic Director's Honor Roll both semesters.

Sophomore Year (2007): Played in all 13 games with one start. Second on the team with 51 ground balls. Scored 15 points (9g, 6a). Five multi-point games. Tallied a career-best three points, including a season-best two goals at Georgetown. Started versus Colgate and tied his season high with two goals. Scored two points (1g, 1a) versus Binghamton, Cornell and Albany. Also had goals against Virginia and Rutgers. Recorded assists at Loyola and Massachusetts. Named to the Athletic Director's Honor Roll both semesters.

Junior Year (2008): Named to the USILA All-America Third Team. Played in all 18 contests with 11 starts. Saw action in a variety of situations, including man-down and on clears. Also played some defensive midfield. Second on the team with 73 ground balls. Scored 21 points (13g, 8a). Went 2-for-4 (.500) on face offs. Registered the first hat trick of his career with three goals to help lead the Orange to a come-from-behind win against Virginia in the NCAA semifinals. Tied his career-best with three points against Binghamton and at Hobart, including a personal-best two assists in each game. Netted two goals at Colgate. Registered six points (5g, 1a) in SU's four NCAA Tournament games. Collected at least one point in five consecutive games against Massachusetts, Colgate, Canisius (NCAA), Notre Dame (NCAA) and Virginia (NCAA). Career-high eight ground balls against Princeton. Scooped up at least five ground balls seven times. Member of the SU Athletic Director's Honor Roll in the fall.

Senior Year (2009): USILA First-Team All-American. Tewaaraton Trophy and Lowe's Senior CLASS Award Finalist. Named a USILA Scholar All-American and selected to the Lowe's Senior All-America First Team ... Selected to the NCAA Championship All-Tournament Team after recording five assists in the postseason, including one on Kenny Nims’ game-tying goal versus Cornell at the end of regulation in the NCAA title game. Team captain. Started all 18 games in the midfield. One of seven players to start every game. Team leader with 77 ground balls. Recorded at least five ground balls in a game five times. Scored 23 points (12g, 11a). Career-best four points (2g, 2a) versus Johns Hopkins. Scored two goals, including the game-winner, and had an assist at Georgetown. Two goals against Albany. One goal, one assist and seven ground balls against Binghamton. One goal, one assist and collected a career-best 10 ground balls versus Princeton at the Inside Lacrosse Big City Classic. Scored a goal and scooped up nine ground balls at Loyola. Also had goals in wins against Providence, Cornell during the regular season, and at Massachusetts. Dished out two assists versus Maryland in the NCAA quarterfinals and Cornell in the NCAA championship game. Also had assists in wins against Hobart and Duke (NCAA). Member of the SU Athletic Director’s Honor Roll both semesters. States Finished his career ranked ninth on SU’s career ground balls list (212).

Statistics

| Year | Games | Goals | Assists | Points | Ground Balls | Face Offs | GW |
|---|---|---|---|---|---|---|---|
| 2006 | 15 | 7 | 1 | 8 | 11 | 1–5 | 0 |
| 2007 | 13 | 9 | 6 | 15 | 51 | 0–2 | 0 |
| 2008 | 18 | 13 | 8 | 21 | 73 | 2–4 | 0 |
| 2009 | 18 | 12 | 11 | 23 | 77 | 0–1 | 1 |
| Total | 64 | 41 | 26 | 67 | 212 | 3–12 | 1 |

== Professional career ==
=== MLL career ===
Abbott was drafted by the Washington Bayhawks for the 2009 Major League Lacrosse season, first round 9th pick. In 2010, he had 10 points 47 ground balls and made the Major League Lacrosse All-Star Game. The Bayhawks went on to win the championship that season. In 2011, he made his second all star game and had 53 ground balls, the most in his career. In 2012, Abbott won his second championship with the Bayhawks. He also won the week 13 defensive player of the week award. In 2013, he won yet another championship and was an all star again. In 2014, Abbott signed a sponsorship with Brine and was selected to Team USA. In 2015 and 2016, he the all star game. In 2017, Abbott set a new record for points with 25 and made the all star game, and then made it again in 2018. He is the all time Bayhawks leader in games played and second in ground balls.

==== Stats ====
| Season | Team | Regular season | | | | | | | | | | | Playoffs | | | | | | | | | | |
| Season | Team | GP | G | 2PG | A | Pts | Sh | GB | Pen | PIM | FOW | FOA | GP | G | 2PG | A | Pts | Sh | GB | Pen | PIM | FOW | FOA |
|---|---|---|---|---|---|---|---|---|---|---|---|---|---|---|---|---|---|---|---|---|---|---|---|
| 2009 | Washington Bayhawks | 9 | 5 | 0 | 4 | 9 | 15 | 17 | 0 | 0 | 0 | 0 | – | – | – | – | – | – | – | – | – | – | – |
| 2010 | Chesapeake Bayhawks | 12 | 5 | 0 | 5 | 10 | 19 | 47 | 0 | 5 | 0 | 0 | 2 | 0 | 0 | 1 | 1 | 2 | 1 | 0 | 0 | 0 | 0 |
| 2011 | Chesapeake Bayhawks | 12 | 8 | 0 | 2 | 10 | 23 | 53 | 0 | 0 | 0 | 0 | 1 | 1 | 0 | 1 | 2 | 2 | 3 | 0 | 0 | 0 | 0 |
| 2012 | Chesapeake Bayhawks | 14 | 7 | 0 | 4 | 11 | 21 | 45 | 0 | 0 | 0 | 0 | 2 | 0 | 0 | 1 | 1 | 0 | 11 | 0 | 0 | 0 | 0 |
| 2013 | Chesapeake Bayhawks | 14 | 14 | 0 | 8 | 22 | 30 | 47 | 0 | 2.5 | 0 | 0 | 2 | 0 | 0 | 2 | 2 | 4 | 5 | 0 | 0 | 0 | 0 |
| 2014 | Chesapeake Bayhawks | 13 | 8 | 0 | 8 | 16 | 35 | 31 | 0 | 0 | 0 | 0 | – | – | – | – | – | – | – | – | – | – | – |
| 2015 | Chesapeake Bayhawks | 13 | 17 | 0 | 7 | 24 | 44 | 25 | 0 | 0 | 1 | 1 | – | – | – | – | – | – | – | – | – | – | – |
| 2016 | Chesapeake Bayhawks | 14 | 11 | 0 | 8 | 19 | 24 | 42 | 0 | 0 | 0 | 0 | – | – | – | – | – | – | – | – | – | – | – |
| 2017 | Chesapeake Bayhawks | 14 | 16 | 0 | 9 | 25 | 43 | 27 | 0 | 1 | 0 | 0 | – | – | – | – | – | – | – | – | – | – | – |
| 2018 | Chesapeake Bayhawks | 12 | 13 | 0 | 7 | 20 | 41 | 20 | 0 | 1 | 0 | 0 | – | – | – | – | – | – | – | – | – | – | – |
| 2019 | Chesapeake Bayhawks | 16 | 11 | 0 | 4 | 15 | 41 | 30 | 0 | 0 | 0 | 0 | – | – | – | – | – | – | – | – | – | – | – |
| | | 143 | 115 | 0 | 66 | 181 | 336 | 384 | 0 | 9.5 | 1 | 1 | 7 | 1 | 0 | 5 | 6 | 8 | 20 | 0 | 0 | 0 | 0 |
| Career total: | | 150 | 116 | 0 | 71 | 187 | 344 | 404 | 0 | 9.5 | 1 | 1 | | | | | | | | | | | |

GP–Games played; G–Goals; 2PG–2-point goals; A–Assists; Pts–Points; Sh–Shots; GB–Ground balls; Pen–Penalties; PIM–Penalty minutes; FOW–Faceoffs won; FOA–Faceoffs attempted

=== NLL career ===
He was drafted by the Boston Blazers for the 2009 National Lacrosse League season, second round 20th overall pick.

| Matt Abbott | | Regular season | | | | | | | | | Playoffs | | | | | | | | |
| Season | Team | GP | G | A | Pts | LB | PIM | Pts/GP | LB/GP | PIM/GP | GP | G | A | Pts | LB | PIM | Pts/GP | LB/GP | PIM/GP |
|---|---|---|---|---|---|---|---|---|---|---|---|---|---|---|---|---|---|---|---|
| 2010 | Boston Blazers | 7 | 3 | 6 | 9 | 40 | 0 | 1.29 | 5.71 | 0.00 | 1 | 0 | 0 | 0 | 0 | 0 | 0.00 | 0.00 | 0.00 |
| 2011 | Boston Blazers | 6 | 0 | 0 | 0 | 15 | 0 | 0.00 | 2.50 | 0.00 | – | – | – | – | – | – | – | – | – |
| | | 13 | 3 | 6 | 9 | 55 | 0 | 0.69 | 4.23 | 0.00 | 1 | 0 | 0 | 0 | 0 | 0 | 0.00 | 0.00 | 0.00 |
| Career Total: | | 14 | 3 | 6 | 9 | 55 | 0 | 0.64 | 3.93 | 0.00 | | | | | | | | | |

GP–Games played; G–Goals; A–Assists; Pts–Points; LB–Loose balls; PIM–Penalty minutes; Pts/GP–Points per games played; LB/GP–Loose balls per games played; PIM/GP–Penalty minutes per games played.

=== PLL ===
| Season | Team | Regular season | | | | | | | | | | | Playoffs | | | | | | | | | | |
| Season | Team | GP | G | 2PG | A | Pts | Sh | GB | Pen | PIM | FOW | FOA | GP | G | 2PG | A | Pts | Sh | GB | Pen | PIM | FOW | FOA |
|---|---|---|---|---|---|---|---|---|---|---|---|---|---|---|---|---|---|---|---|---|---|---|---|
| 2021 | Whipsnakes | 8 | 1 | 0 | 1 | 2 | 6 | 33 | 1 | 0.5 | 0 | 0 | 3 | 1 | 0 | 1 | 2 | 5 | 14 | 0 | 0 | 0 | 0 |
| 2022 | Cannons | 5 | 0 | 0 | 0 | 0 | 3 | 9 | 1 | 0.5 | 0 | 0 | – | – | – | – | – | – | – | – | – | – | – |
| | | 13 | 1 | 0 | 1 | 2 | 9 | 42 | 2 | 1 | 0 | 0 | 3 | 1 | 0 | 1 | 2 | 5 | 14 | 0 | 0 | 0 | 0 |
| Career total: | | 16 | 2 | 0 | 2 | 4 | 14 | 56 | 2 | 1 | 0 | 0 | | | | | | | | | | | |

GP–Games played; G–Goals; 2PG–2-point goals; A–Assists; Pts–Points; Sh–Shots; GB–Ground balls; Pen–Penalties; PIM–Penalty minutes; FOW–Faceoffs won; FOA–Faceoffs attempted
