= Dylan Molloy =

American lacrosse player

Personal information
- Nationality: American
- Born: August 18, 1995 (age 31)
- Height: 6 ft 1 in (185 cm)
- Weight: 220 lb (100 kg; 15 st 10 lb)

Sport
- Position: Attack (Field), Forward (Box)
- Shoots: Right
- NCAA team: Brown (2017)
- NLL draft: 43rd overall, 2017; Buffalo Bandits
- NLL team: Colorado Mammoth
- MLL draft: 1st overall, 2017; Florida Launch
- MLL teams: Florida Launch; New York Lizards
- PLL team Former teams: California Redwoods; New York Atlas; Chrome
- Pro career: 2017–

Career highlights
- 2016 Tewaaraton Award; 2016 Lt. Raymond Enners Award; 6th all-time in NCAA single-season points; 4th all-time in NCAA career goals; 9th all-time in NCAA career points

Dylan Molloy (August 18, 1995) is an American lacrosse player who plays as an attackman for California Redwoods of the Premier Lacrosse League. He was a three-time All-American NCAA lacrosse player at Brown University from 2014 to 2017 who led his team to two straight NCAA tournaments.

== Early and personal life ==
Dylan Molloy was born on August 18, 1995 to Lynn and Don Molloy, and is a native of Setauket, New York. He attended St. Anthony's High School, where he earned two varsity letters in lacrosse and one each in cross country and winter track. He served as a captain of the lacrosse team his senior year and was named team MVP. Molloy works as an underwriter for an insurance company.

== College career ==
During Molloy's four years at Brown, the team compiled a record of 45 wins and 16 losses, with the 2016 squad compiling a 13 and 1 record. The 2016 team went 14 and 2 during the regular season and received a number five seeding in the NCAA tournament before losing to eventual champion Maryland in the semifinals, in overtime. Brown made the NCAA tournament two straight years during Molloy's tenure, with a tournament record of two wins and two losses.

Molloy is among the all-time leaders with 318 career points.

== Professional career ==
Molloy was selected first overall in the 2017 MLL Draft by the Florida Launch.

After being a part of the initial group of players to form the Premier Lacrosse League, being assigned to the Redwoods Lacrosse Club, Molloy reversed his decision and returned to MLL with the New York Lizards.

Molloy was released by Chrome Lacrosse Club on August 1, 2023. The following week, he was signed by Atlas. After finishing the 2023 season, Molloy played limited time for the Atlas in 2024 as a reserve attackman. Molloy signed with the California Redwoods following the 2024 season.

Molloy was drafted 43rd overall in the 2017 NLL Draft by the Buffalo Bandits.

== Statistics ==
=== MLL ===
		Regular Season					Playoffs
Season	Team	GP	G	2ptG	A	Pts	GP	G	A	Pts
2017	Florida	8	21	0	6	27	1	4	1	5
2018	Florida	14	41	0	18	59	--	--	--	--
2019	New York	13	28	0	14	42	--	--	--	--
2020	New York	4	7	0	1	8	--	--	--	--
MLL Totals		39	97	0	39	136	1	4	1	5

=== NLL ===
Dylan Molloy		Regular season									Playoffs								
Season	Team	GP	G	A	Pts	LB	PIM	Pts/GP	LB/GP	PIM/GP	GP	G	A	Pts	LB	PIM	Pts/GP	LB/GP	PIM/GP
2019-20	Colorado Mammoth	4	1	3	4	10	0	1.00	2.50	0.00	–	–	–	–	–	–	–	–	–
		4	1	3	4	10	0	1.00	2.50	0.00	0	0	0	0	0	0	0.00	0.00	0.00
Career Total:		4	1	3	4	10	0	1.00	2.50	0.00									

GP–Games played; G–Goals; A–Assists; Pts–Points; LB–Loose balls; PIM–Penalty minutes; Pts/GP–Points per games played; LB/GP–Loose balls per games played; PIM/GP–Penalty minutes per games played.

=== PLL ===
Season	Team	Regular season											Playoffs										
Season	Team	GP	G	2PG	A	Pts	Sh	GB	Pen	PIM	FOW	FOA	GP	G	2PG	A	Pts	Sh	GB	Pen	PIM	FOW	FOA
2021	Chrome	3	6	0	4	10	20	6	1	0.5	0	0	–	–	–	–	–	–	–	–	–	–	–
2022	Chrome	10	14	0	11	25	52	15	0	0	0	0	1	0	0	0	0	6	1	0	0	0	0
2023	Chrome	2	2	0	0	2	8	1	0	0	0	0	–	–	–	–	–	–	–	–	–	–	–
2023	Atlas	2	1	0	1	2	4	1	0	0	0	0	1	0	0	0	0	1	0	0	0	0	0
2024	New York Atlas	3	4	0	2	6	10	2	0	0	-	-	0	0	0	0	0	-	-	-	-	-	-
2025	California Redwoods	10	26	1	5	32	87	16	3	1.5	0	0	2	4	0	1	5	13	2	0	0	0	0
2026	California Redwoods	12	25	0	9	34	87	16	1	1	0	0	1	6	0	1	7	11	2	0	0	0	0
		42	78	1	32	111	268	57	5	3	0	0	5	10	0	2	12	18	1	0	0	0	0
Career total:		47	88	1	34	123	286	58	5	3	0	0											

GP–Games played; G–Goals; 2PG–2-point goals; A–Assists; Pts–Points; Sh–Shots; GB–Ground balls; Pen–Penalties; PIM–Penalty minutes; FOW–Faceoffs won; FOA–Faceoffs attempted

=== Brown University ===
Season	GP	G	A	Pts
2014	14	29	10	39
2015	17	62	30	90
2016	18	62	54	116 ^{(a)}
2017	14	44	27	71
Totals	63	197 ^{(b)}	121	318 ^{(c)}

^{(a)} 6th all-time in NCAA single-season points
^{(b)} 4th in career goals
^{(c)} 9th in career points

== See also ==
- 2016 NCAA Division I Men's Lacrosse Championship
- Brown Bears men's lacrosse
