= Max Seibald =

Lacrosse player

Personal information
- Nickname: Seabiscuit
- Nationality: American; Israel
- Born: August 14, 1987 (age 38) Hewlett, New York, U.S.
- Height: 6 ft 1 in (185 cm)
- Weight: 215 lb (98 kg; 15 st 5 lb)

Sport
- Position: Midfield
- Shoots: Right
- NCAA team: Cornell (2009)
- NLL teams: Philadelphia Wings
- MLL team Former teams: Boston Cannons; New York Lizards Denver Outlaws
- Pro career: 2009–2018

Maxwell Oren Seibald (born August 14, 1987) is an Israeli-American former professional lacrosse player for the Boston Cannons of Major League Lacrosse. He played midfield position. He graduated in 2009 from Cornell University. He is a former Tewaaraton Award winner, and two-time Team USA player. He played for Team Israel in 2018.

== Early and personal life ==
Seibald is from Hewlett, New York, and is Jewish. He is the son of Jack (who was born on the Caribbean island of Curaçao) and Stephanie Seibald, and has two older sisters. His paternal grandmother lived in Netanya, Israel, for five years, which is where she met his grandfather. His nickname is Seabiscuit.

He attended Hewlett High School, where Seibald was a two-time high school All-American in lacrosse, was named to the Newsday 2004 All-Long Island Empire State team, lettered four times in soccer, three times in track, and twice in football, and was the school's Male Athlete of the year as a senior. As a child he attended Camp Starlight in Starlight, Pennsylvania, where he found his love for lacrosse. In 2016, he was also attending the New York University Stern School of Business.

On May 18, 2019, Seibald married Lauren Rubel in Manhattan. Both attended Hewlett High School and Camp Starlight. On January 11, 2021, their son Cooper Hayes was born.

== College career ==
Seibald was a starter at Cornell University for its Big Red men's lacrosse team, as he attended the school's College of Agriculture and Life Sciences. As a freshman he earned Ivy League 2006 Rookie of the Year honors in a unanimous vote, and over his career became the first Cornell player to be All-Ivy for all four years of his career and was a three-time first team All-American.

As a sophomore, Seibald was one of the five finalists for the 2007 Tewaaraton Trophy, awarded to the "Most Outstanding" collegiate lacrosse player in the United States. He received the Award in 2009, and was the fourth second-year player to ever win it. That year he was named both NCAA Player of the Year and the Marty Glickman Outstanding Jewish Scholastic Athlete of the Year by the National Jewish Sports Hall of Fame.

As a senior, he received the Lowe's senior class award, and the 2009 Charles H. Moore Award - Cornell University Outstanding Senior Varsity Athlete.

Seibald led the Big Red's high-powered offense to an undefeated regular season, and to the 2007 NCAA Final Four.

Seibald was elected to the Sphinx Head Society, Cornell's oldest senior honor society.

== Professional career ==
Seibald is a five-time Major League Lacrosse All-Star, and is fifth on the all-time leader board for two-point goals. He played for the Denver Outlaws for three years, for the New York Lizards for three years, and most recently for the Boston Cannons. He also played professionally indoor as well for the Philadelphia Wings from 2010 to 2013.

Seibald was selected 2nd overall by the Denver Outlaws in the 2009 Major League Lacrosse draft. He was a 2009 MLL All-Star.

On September 9, 2009, Seibald was selected 8th overall by the Boston Blazers in the indoor National Lacrosse League draft, and was traded to the Philadelphia Wings shortly into the 2010 season.

In the 2010 MLL All-Star Game skills competition, Seibald posted a world record-tying shot of 110 miles per hour. He shared the record with Team USA teammate Paul Rabil, who defended his 2009 fastest shot title by posting a second shot of 111 to Seibald's 109 miles per hour second shot. He was a 2011 MLL All-Star.

In 2012, Seibald set a career high in Loose Balls (77), while helping the Wings make the playoffs for the first time in 5 years. He was a 2012 MLL All-Star. Before the 2013 season, Seibald injured his foot in training camp, and played in six games in 2013.

He was a 2014 and 2015 MLL All-Star. In January 2015 Seibald was traded by the New York Lizards to the Boston Cannons, and named tri-captain. In 2016 and 2017 he was team captain.

Seibald announced his retirement from professional lacrosse following the conclusion of the 2018 season.

== National Team career ==
=== Team USA ===
Seibald played on the US Men's National Lacrosse Team at the 2010 World Lacrosse Championships in Manchester, England. The US team defeated Canada to win the World Championship. His jersey number was 42, the same number he wore at Cornell. He also played for the 2014 US Men's National Lacrosse Team at the 2014 World Lacrosse Championships in Denver, Colorado.

=== Team Israel ===
Seibald was announced as a member of Israel's 150-man player pool for the 2018 World Lacrosse Championship. Seibald is Jewish, and is thus eligible for Israeli citizenship under Israel's Law of Return. He was named to the team, and competed on it in the World Championships in Netanya, Israel, from July 12–21, 2018, where he scored eleven goals in seven games, adding two assists.

== Statistics ==
=== NLL ===
		Regular Season						Playoffs
Season	Team	GP	G	A	Pts	LB	PIM	GP	G	A	Pts	LB	PIM
2010	Philadelphia	12	4	7	11	54	10	--	--	--	--	--	--
2011	Philadelphia	15	10	14	24	53	21	--	--	--	--	--	--
2012	Philadelphia	15	5	9	14	77	13	1	0	1	1	3	0
2013	Philadelphia	DID	NOT	PLAY	(INJ	RES)	--	--	--	--	--	--	--
NLL totals		42	19	30	49	184	44	1	0	1	1	3	1

=== Major League Lacrosse ===
		Regular Season							Playoffs
Season	Team	GP	G	2ptG	A	Pts	LB	PIM	GP	G	2ptG	A	Pts	LB	PIM
2009	Denver	10	9	2	1	12	28	2	2	0	0	1	1	11	0.5
2010	Denver	9	20	2	8	30	22	4	1	2	0	0	2	1	0
2011	Denver	9	12	3	2	17	13	1.5	1	1	0	0	1	2	1
2012	Long Island	13	24	4	11	39	31	3	1	2	0	1	3	1	0
2013	New York	6	5	2	2	9	9	2.5	--	--	--	--	--	--	--
2014	New York	11	17	2	2	21	10	1.5	1	2	0	0	2	1	0
2015	Boston	14	17	2	9	28	35	0.5	1	2	2	0	4	1	1
2016	Boston	12	17	4	7	28	21	3	--	--	--	--	--	--	--
2017	Boston	11	15	5	2	22	12	5	--	--	--	--	--	--	--
2018	Boston	12	9	5	9	23	19	2.5	--	--	--	--	--	--	--
MLL Totals		107	145	31	53	229	200	25.5	7	9	2	2	13	17	2.5

=== Cornell University ===
Season	GP	G	A	Pts	GB
2006	14	19	14	33	26
2007	16	17	20	37	36
2008	15	27	6	33	39
2009	17	28	10	38	46
Totals	62	91	50	141	147

== Awards ==
- 2006 Ivy League Rookie of the Year
- 2006 All-Ivy League
- 2006 USILA 2nd Team All-American
- 2007 USILA 1st Team All-American
- 2008 USILA 1st Team All-American
- 2009 Tewaaraton Trophy winner
- 2009 Diane Geppi-Aikens Scholarship – Outstanding Commitment to Community Service
- 2009 Lowe's Senior CLASS Award
- 2009 Lt. Raymond J. Enners Award – USILA Outstanding Player of the Year, Division I
- 2009 Lt. j.g. Donald McLaughlin Jr. Award – USILA Outstanding Midfielder of the Year, Division I
- 2009 USILA 1st Team All-America Selection
- 2009 1st Team All-Ivy Selection, unanimous
- 2009 Charles H. Moore Award – Cornell University Outstanding Senior Varsity Athlete / Solo Team Captain

Preceded by Mike Leveille	Tewaaraton Trophy; 2009	Succeeded by Ned Crotty
