= Mike Leveille =

American lacrosse player

Personal information
- Nationality: American
- Born: December 25, 1985 (age 40) Delmar, New York, U.S.
- Height: 6 ft 3 in (191 cm)
- Weight: 204 lb (93 kg; 14 st 8 lb)

Sport
- Position: Attack
- NLL draft: 36th overall, 2008; Philadelphia Wings
- MLL team: Chicago Machine
- NCAA team: Syracuse University
- Pro career: 2008–

Mike Leveille (born December 25, 1985) is a former professional lacrosse player with the Chicago Machine of Major League Lacrosse. He was an All-American at Syracuse University, and was awarded the Tewaaraton Trophy in 2008.

== Professional career ==
Leveille was drafted in the 2008 Major League Lacrosse Collegiate draft by the New Jersey Pride, and was to the Chicago Machine hours later. His brother Kevin Leveille is also a member of the Chicago Machine.

Leveille made an immediate impact, winning Rookie of the Week honors in first week in the league. He scored two goals and assisted on two goals by his brother Kevin against the Washington Bayhawks.

On May 17, 2014, both Mike and his brother Kevin were inducted into the Albany Academy High School Hall of Fame for their skills, prowess, and endless charitable contributions.

== Awards ==
Preceded by Matt Danowski	Tewaaraton Trophy; 2008	Succeeded by Max Seibald

== Statistics ==
=== Syracuse University ===
Season	GP	G	A	Pts	PPG
2005	13	30	11	41	3.15
2006	15	31	21	52	3.47
2007	13	22	17	39	3.00
2008	18	49	34	83	4.61
Totals	59	132	83	215	3.64

=== MLL ===
		Regular Season							Playoffs
Season	Team	GP	G	2ptG	A	Pts	LB	PIM	GP	G	2ptG	A	Pts	LB	PIM
2008	Chicago	10	18	0	18	36	26	2.5	--	--	--	--	--	--	--
2009	Chicago	12	24	0	18	42	14	2.5	--	--	--	--	--	--	--
MLL Totals		22	42	0	36	78	40	6	--	--	--	--	--	--	--
