= Jimmy Lewis (lacrosse) =

American lacrosse player

Personal information
- Nationality: American
- Height: 5 ft 10 in (178 cm)
- Weight: 160 lb (73 kg; 11 st 6 lb)

Sport
- Position: Attack
- Shoots: Right
- NCAA team: Navy

Career highlights
- 1964 USILA National Champions; 1965 USILA National Champions; 1966 USILA National Champions; 1964 Division I Attackman of the Year; 1965 Division I Attackman of the Year; 1966 Division I Attackman of the Year

James C. Lewis was an All-American lacrosse player at Navy from 1964 to 1966, leading the Midshipmen to national titles in each of his three years, as well as perfect seasons. Navy's national titles during these years were under the Wingate Memorial Trophy format where national champions were selected by committee.

== Navy career ==
In 1966, The Baltimore Sun called Lewis the "greatest living lacrosseman". He is ranked fifth all-time in Navy men's lacrosse scoring with 169 career points. Lewis earned first-team All America honors all three years while in college, as well as being named the Jack Turnbull Award winner in 1964, 1965 and 1966. In 1965, Lewis led Navy to a 12 and 0 record while defeating Army 18-7 en route to the Midshipmen's fourth straight undisputed national championship. During this stretch Navy won 22nd games in a row. Lewis led Navy to three straight National Championships at a time when the top team was voted on by the USILA.

This is considered the greatest stretch of lacrosse in Navy lacrosse history, an eight-year period from 1960 through 1968, where Navy won outright or shared in eight straight national titles.

Lewis was elected to the National Lacrosse Hall of Fame in 1981, and is generally considered the top Navy lacrosse player of all time. He won the Navy's Sword For Men award in 1966 and also graduated from TOPGUN, the elite United States Navy Fighter Weapons School.

Lewis was All-American lacrosse player at Uniondale High School on Long Island, where he also played soccer. He still holds the single-game New York high school lacrosse record for points with 21.

In the 1964 NCAA Men's Soccer Championship finals against Michigan State, Lewis scored the game's only goal to help the Midshipmen to their only NCAA soccer title and was named Tournament Most Outstanding Player.

== Statistics ==
Statistics are available on Navy Lacrosse media guides. See Navy lacrosse official site link below.

=== United States Naval Academy ===
Season	GP	G	A	Pts	PPG
1964	10	27	20	47	4.70
1965	12	27	36	63	5.25
1966	12	24	35	59	4.91
Totals	34	78	91	169	4.97 *

* Lewis played during the pre-NCAA days under the USILA, at 4.97 points-per-game during his career, this would rank Lewis among the top all-time PPG

== Accomplishments ==
- 1966 Wingate Memorial Trophy (College Champions - Navy)
- 1965 Wingate Memorial Trophy (College Champions - Navy)
- 1964 Wingate Memorial Trophy (College Champions - Navy)
- 1964 NCAA Division I Men's Soccer Championship (College Champions - Navy)

== See also ==
- National Lacrosse Hall of Fame
- Wingate Memorial Trophy
- Navy Midshipmen men's lacrosse
- 1964 NCAA Division I Men's Soccer Championship

== Awards ==
Preceded by Ray Altman	Jack Turnbull Award; 1964, 1965, 1966	Succeeded by Jack Heim
