= Ned Crotty =

American lacrosse player

Personal information
- Nickname: 2's
- Nationality: American
- Born: September 26, 1986 (age 39) New Vernon, New Jersey, U.S.
- Height: 6 ft 2 in (188 cm)
- Weight: 190

Sport
- Position: Attack
- Shoots: Left
- NCAA team: Duke (2010)
- NLL draft: 11th overall, 2010; Colorado Mammoth
- NLL teams: Colorado Mammoth; Philadelphia Wings
- MLL draft: 1st overall, 2010; Chicago Machine
- MLL teams: Chicago Machine; New York Lizards; Rochester/Dallas Rattlers
- PLL teams: Chrome LC
- Pro career: 2010–2022
Medal record
Representing United States
Men's lacrosse
World Lacrosse Championship
Winner	2010 Manchester
Winner	2018 Netanya
Runner-up	2014 Denver

Ned Crotty (born September 26, 1986) is an American former professional lacrosse player. He played for the Dallas Rattlers of Major League Lacrosse, and played for the NCAA Division I college lacrosse team at Duke University. He also played indoor lacrosse for the Philadelphia Wings of the National Lacrosse League, and with the Chrome Lacrosse Club of the Premier Lacrosse League

He currently resides in New York City with his wife Kaitlyn (Weeks) Crotty, who played lacrosse for Boston College.

== Early years ==
Crotty attended and played lacrosse at the Delbarton School in New Jersey, graduating in 2005 and winning the state's lacrosse Tournament of Champions in each of his four years on the team. He also played varsity hockey, as well as lacrosse, earning NJ Player of the Year by The Star-Ledger, making him the only student-athlete to earn recognition in two different sports in a single year.

== College career ==
Crotty entered the 2010 season ranked seventh in career assists (84) and 17th in career points (153) at Duke. Crotty was an All American and won the Tewaaraton Trophy for most outstanding college lacrosse player in 2010. On May 31, 2010, Ned and the Duke Lacrosse team won their first ever Division I NCAA Men's Lacrosse Championship. He and teammate Max Quinzani were a scoring duo at Duke for two years following the departure of Matt Danowski and Zack Greer. Crotty is considered to be the best passer in Duke lacrosse history, posting 63 assists in a single season, a Duke University record.

== Professional career ==
He was the 1st overall pick in 2010 MLL Draft by the New York Lizards. He most recently played with the Dallas Rattlers.

He previously played for the Philadelphia Wings and the Colorado Mammoth of the NLL.

He joined Paul Rabil’s PLL for its inaugural season in 2019 as a member of the Chrome Lacrosse Club.

Crotty announced his retirement on April 12, 2022.

== Statistics ==
=== NLL ===
Ned Crotty		Regular season									Playoffs								
Season	Team	GP	G	A	Pts	LB	PIM	Pts/GP	LB/GP	PIM/GP	GP	G	A	Pts	LB	PIM	Pts/GP	LB/GP	PIM/GP
2011	Colorado Mammoth	8	1	3	4	16	4	0.50	2.00	0.50	–	–	–	–	–	–	–	–	–
2012	Philadelphia Wings	8	2	12	14	31	12	1.75	3.88	1.50	1	2	1	3	4	0	3.00	4.00	0.00
2013	Philadelphia Wings	16	3	7	10	53	13	0.63	3.31	0.81	1	0	0	0	0	2	0.00	0.00	2.00
		32	6	22	28	100	29	0.88	3.13	0.91	2	2	1	3	4	2	1.50	2.00	1.00
Career Total:		34	8	23	31	104	31	0.91	3.06	0.91									

GP–Games played; G–Goals; A–Assists; Pts–Points; LB–Loose balls; PIM–Penalty minutes; Pts/GP–Points per games played; LB/GP–Loose balls per games played; PIM/GP–Penalty minutes per games played.

=== Duke University ===
Season	GP	G	A	Pts	PPG
2010	20	23	63	86	4.1
2009	19	23	55	78	4.3
2008	20	17	18	35	--
2007	20	25	9	34	--
2006	8	4	3	7	--
Totals	87	92	148	240	--

=== MLL ===
Season	Team	Regular season											Playoffs										
Season	Team	GP	G	2PG	A	Pts	Sh	GB	Pen	PIM	FOW	FOA	GP	G	2PG	A	Pts	Sh	GB	Pen	PIM	FOW	FOA
2010	Chicago Machine	7	11	0	13	24	39	9	0	0	0	0	–	–	–	–	–	–	–	–	–	–	–
2011	Rochester Rattlers	12	29	0	21	50	86	13	0	3	0	0	–	–	–	–	–	–	–	–	–	–	–
2012	Rochester Rattlers	12	15	0	16	31	52	11	0	1	0	0	–	–	–	–	–	–	–	–	–	–	–
2013	Rochester Rattlers	13	15	1	20	36	63	12	0	0	0	0	–	–	–	–	–	–	–	–	–	–	–
2014	New York Lizards	12	18	0	7	25	58	12	0	1	0	0	1	1	0	0	1	8	0	0	0	0	0
2015	New York Lizards	12	10	0	12	22	39	13	0	3	0	0	2	2	0	0	2	5	2	0	0	0	0
2016	Rochester Rattlers	13	17	0	31	48	61	22	0	0	0	0	–	–	–	–	–	–	–	–	–	–	–
2017	Rochester Rattlers	12	8	1	24	33	42	21	0	0	0	0	1	1	0	0	1	5	0	0	0	0	0
2018	Dallas Rattlers	8	16	1	8	25	46	3	0	0	0	0	–	–	–	–	–	–	–	–	–	–	–
		101	139	3	152	294	486	116	0	8	0	0	4	4	0	0	4	13	2	0	0	0	0
Career total:		105	143	3	152	298	499	118	0	8	0	0											

GP–Games played; G–Goals; 2PG–2-point goals; A–Assists; Pts–Points; Sh–Shots; GB–Ground balls; Pen–Penalties; PIM–Penalty minutes; FOW–Faceoffs won; FOA–Faceoffs attempted

=== PLL ===
Season	Team	Regular season											Playoffs										
Season	Team	GP	G	2PG	A	Pts	Sh	GB	Pen	PIM	FOW	FOA	GP	G	2PG	A	Pts	Sh	GB	Pen	PIM	FOW	FOA
2019	Chrome	10	17	1	9	27	46	4	0	0	0	0	2	0	0	1	1	2	2	0	0	0	0
2020	Chrome	4	3	0	7	10	11	3	0	0	0	0	–	–	–	–	–	–	–	–	–	–	–
2021	Chrome	9	0	0	9	9	26	14	1	1	0	0	–	–	–	–	–	–	–	–	–	–	–
		23	20	1	25	46	83	21	1	1	0	0	2	0	0	1	1	2	2	0	0	0	0
Career total:		25	20	1	26	47	85	23	1	1	0	0											

GP–Games played; G–Goals; 2PG–2-point goals; A–Assists; Pts–Points; Sh–Shots; GB–Ground balls; Pen–Penalties; PIM–Penalty minutes; FOW–Faceoffs won; FOA–Faceoffs attempted

Preceded by Max Seibald	Tewaaraton Trophy; 2010	Succeeded by Steele Stanwick
