= Kenny Nims =

American lacrosse player

Personal information
- Nationality: American
- Born: March 21, 1987 (age 38) Watertown, New York, U.S.
- Height: 6 ft 0 in (183 cm)
- Weight: 180 lb (82 kg; 12 st 12 lb)
- Spouse: Meredith Bonisteel

Sport
- Position: Attack
- Shoots: Right
- NLL draft: 41st overall, 2009; Orlando Titans
- MLL team: Chicago Machine
- NCAA team: Syracuse University
- Pro career: 2009–2010

Kenny Nims (born March 21, 1987) was a lacrosse player for the Chicago Machine of Major League Lacrosse. He played college lacrosse for the Syracuse Orange. Nims played for the Orange from 2006 to 2009, leading the team to two straight NCAA tournament championships in 2008 and 2009. The Machine selected Nims with the first pick of the 2009 MLL draft.

== Statistics ==
=== Syracuse University ===
Season	GP	G	A	Pts	PPG
2006	15	9	4	13	--
2007	13	18	12	30	--
2008	18	34	24	58	--
2009	18	32	42	74	--
Totals	62	117	67	185	--

=== Major League Lacrosse ===
		Regular Season							Playoffs
Season	Team	GP	G	2ptG	A	Pts	LB	PIM	GP	G	2ptG	A	Pts	LB	PIM
2009	Chicago	8	6	0	9	15	5	0	--	--	--	--	--	--	--
MLL Totals		8	6	0	9	15	5	0	--	--	--	--	--	--	--
