= John Howard (lacrosse) =

American teacher and coach

- Howard as head coach at Maryland

Biographical details
- Born: December 12, 1934; Annapolis, Maryland, U.S.
- Died: July 19, 2007 (aged 72); Indianapolis, Indiana, U.S.

Playing career
- 1954–1956: Washington College
- 1963–1967: Washington Lacrosse Club
- Position: Attackman

Coaching career (HC unless noted)
- 1960–1961: Maryland (freshman)
- 1962–1965: Maryland (asst.)
- 1966–1969: Maryland

Head coaching record
- Overall: 32–7–1

Accomplishments and honors

Championships
- 1967 USILA National Co-Championship; 1966 Atlantic Coast Conference Championship; 1967 Atlantic Coast Conference Championship; 1968 Atlantic Coast Conference Championship

Awards
- 1956 Jack Turnbull Award

John Douglas "Hezzy" Howard (December 12, 1934 – July 19, 2007) was an American educator, college lacrosse player and coach. He coached the University of Maryland lacrosse team from 1966 to 1969 and amassed a 32–7–1 record. He attended Washington College, where in 1956 he received the Jack Turnbull Award as the nation's best attackman. Howard was inducted into the National Lacrosse Hall of Fame in 1978. At the University of Maryland, Howard also taught as an English professor and held various posts in the school's English department including acting chairman from 1979 to 1980.

== Early life and college career ==
A native of Annapolis, Maryland, born on December 12, 1934, Howard attended St. Mary's High School starting in 1948, where he played lacrosse on the school's first team. He graduated in 1952.

Howard then went on to Washington College in 1953, where he played soccer, and lacrosse as an attackman and face-off man. He was a member of the Omicron Delta Kappa honor society. In 1954, Howard led the nation in assists and helped the Shoremen capture the Laurie Cox Division championship. The United States Intercollegiate Lacrosse Association named Howard an honorable mention All-American. The following the season, he repeated as the nation's assist leader and the USILA named him to its third team. In 1956, the USILA awarded him All-America first team honors and the Jack Turnbull Award as the nation's best attackman. Howard was invited to participate in the 1956 North/South Senior All-Star Game, and scored five goals and earned six assists on the way to a South squad win. Howard set the record for career assists with 173, which stood until broken by Tim Nelson of Syracuse in 1985.

After college, Howard served as a commissioned officer in the United States Navy. He attained the rank of lieutenant.

== Coaching career ==
Howard began his coaching career at the University of Maryland as the freshman team coach in 1960. In 1962, he was promoted to assistant coach under co-head coaches Jack Faber and Al Heagy. In 1966, Howard took over as the head coach himself. In 1967, Howard guided Maryland to an 8–1 record, which was enough to secure a share of the USILA national championship alongside Navy and Johns Hopkins. An upset of heavy favorites Johns Hopkins, 9–4, was the deciding factor in Maryland's title stake. The following season in 1968, Maryland defeated the dominant team of the period, Navy, 5–3, which was the Terrapins' first victory against the Midshipmen in eight years. That year also saw one of only four ties in Maryland lacrosse history, a 6–6 stalemate with Princeton.

Rennie Smith, a Maryland assistant coach and Lacrosse Hall of Fame inductee, said, "Hezzy was a bit of a free spirit, but he was very likeable. He was a handsome guy. We used to like to go to his office because the girls were always coming in and cooing, 'Hi, Hezzy.'" Bill Sbarra, who played as a defenseman under Howard, said, "He was the first coach I ever saw who inverted his attackmen and midfielders ... The day we upset Hopkins, we knew everything Hopkins was going to do. Hezzy's scouting report was brilliant."

While coaching at Maryland, Howard also played lacrosse at the club level. He played for the Washington Lacrosse Club from 1963 to 1967, including in the Maryland Box Lacrosse League in 1965 and 1966. He led the league in scoring in 1965.

== Academic career ==
While at Maryland, Howard also taught in the English department. He earned his master's degree in 1962 and Ph.D. in 1967 from the University of Maryland. Howard began teaching as an English instructor from 1964 to 1967, while working towards his doctorate. He became an assistant professor in 1967, an associate professor in 1971, and a full professor in 1987. He served as associate chairman of the English department from 1969 to 1972 and 1977 to 1979, and then acting chairman from 1979 to 1980. From 1987 to 1990, he was the director of graduate studies. Howard authored numerous books, essays, and literature reviews, including several on English poet William Blake. Howard wrote Infernal Poetics: Poetic Structures in Blake's Lambeth Prophecies and Blake's Milton: A Study in the Selfhood.

== Later life ==
In 2000, Howard retired to Greencastle, Indiana, where his wife taught at DePauw University. He attempted to foster the sport at the college, but failed. Howard explained:

"I tried to start lacrosse at DePauw. We held a few practices in the fall. The kids had a problem—they would not believe you could catch and throw a lacrosse ball while you were running. They thought you had to be standing still ... After Christmas, nobody came back. Either I'm a lousy teacher or kids in Indiana just didn't like lacrosse."

Howard died of pneumonia on July 19, 2007, at the age of 72 at Saint Vincent Hospice in Indianapolis. He was inducted into National Lacrosse Hall of Fame in 1978, the Washington College Hall of Fame in 1983, and the St. Mary's High School Athletic Hall of Fame in 1996.

== Publications ==
- Blake's Milton: A Study in the Selfhood (1976)
- Infernal Poetics: Poetic Structures in Blake's Lambeth Prophecies (1984)
