= Bud Beardmore =

American lacrosse coach (1939–2016)

Biographical details
- Born: October 26, 1939; Baltimore, Maryland, U.S.
- Died: January 20, 2016 (aged 76); Severna Park, Maryland, U.S.

Playing career
- 1960–1962: Maryland
- 1963–1964: University Club
- 1970–1971: Severna Park Club
- Position: Midfielder

Coaching career (HC unless noted)

Lacrosse
- 1964–1966: Severn School
- 1967: Hobart
- 1968–1969: Virginia
- 1970–1980: Maryland
- 1987: Washington Wave
- 1991–1994: Anne Arundel C.C.

Soccer
- 1974: Maryland

Head coaching record
- Overall: 113–38 (lacrosse); 5–3–5 (soccer)

Accomplishments and honors

Championships
- 2 NCAA Tournament Championships (1973, 1975); 1 Laurie Cox Division Championship (1967); 9 ACC Championships (1969, 1972, 1973, 1974, 1976, 1977, 1978, 1979, 1980)

Awards
- F. Morris Touchstone Award (1973)

Clayton Albert "Bud" Beardmore (October 26, 1939 – January 20, 2016) was an American lacrosse coach. As head coach at the University of Maryland, Beardmore led the Terrapins to two NCAA tournament championships in 1973 and 1975. He was inducted into the National Lacrosse Hall of Fame in 1980.

== Early life ==
Beardmore was born in 1939. He attended Annapolis High School in Annapolis, Maryland, where he first played lacrosse in 1955. He then went on to preparatory school at the Severn School in Severna Park, Maryland. He was named an All-MSA player in 1958. Beardmore attended college at the University of Maryland, where he played lacrosse and received honorable mention All-America honors in 1960 and first team honors in 1961 and 1962. He set the school record for a midfielder with 108 career points from goals and assists. That mark was later broken by one of Beardmore's own players: Frank Urso. Beardmore played in the 1962 North/South Senior All-Star Game. In that game, he helped the South to a 14–4 win with a four-goal effort.

Beardmore continued playing lacrosse after college with the University Club in 1963 and 1964. He served as its co-captain and in 1963 led it to the National Club Championship. He then played for the Severna Park Club in 1970 and 1971. In 1964, Beardmore became the lacrosse coach at the Severn School, where he served for two seasons and amassed a 19–3 record. In 1965, he led the school to its first MSA championship since 1929.

== Coaching career ==
=== Early positions ===
In 1967, Beardmore joined the collegiate coaching ranks at Hobart College. He led the Statesmen to a 9–5 record and a share of the Laurie Cox Division Championship. The following season, he took over as head coach at the University of Virginia. That season, he guided the Cavaliers to a 7–6 record, but the following year, in 1969, the team improved to 7–3 and captured the Atlantic Coast Conference regular season championship.

=== Maryland ===
In 1970, Beardmore returned to his alma mater, where he remained for 11 years and amassed a 107–31 record. During his tenure, Maryland won seven outright ACC championships and shared another. Beardmore led Maryland to the 1973 and 1975 NCAA tournament championships. Maryland finished as runners-up four times after losing in the tournament finals in 1971, 1974, 1976, and 1979. In 1973, he was awarded the F. Morris Touchstone Award as the Division I Coach of the Year.

In 1974, Sports Illustrated wrote about Beardmore, "his last two teams have truly carried his stamp. They have been fastbreaking, aggressive and deep with midfielders who can run opponents into the ground and score like attackmen." That year, Beardmore also served as the Maryland men's soccer head coach and amassed a 5–3–5 record.

In 1975, Maryland played only six NCAA games, the minimum required to be eligible for the NCAA tournament, with the rest of their games against non-association teams "for the good of the game" in Beardmore's words. The Terrapins lost two of their six NCAA games (against Virginia and Navy), did not secure the ACC championship, which went instead to Virginia, and almost failed to qualify for the NCAA tournament. Nevertheless, Maryland advanced through the tournament and to the championship game, where they defeated Navy, 20–13.

After the 1980 season, Beardmore resigned his post at Maryland in order to enter private business. Defensive assistant coach Dino Mattessich was promoted to head coach as Beardmore's replacement.

=== Professional teams ===
In 1974, in the midst of his tenure at the University of Maryland, Beardmore was hired as the head coach of the Maryland Arrows of the National Lacrosse League. Before the season started, however, the franchise elevated him to the position of general manager.

Beardmore coached the Washington Wave of the short-lived Eagle Pro Box Lacrosse League in 1987. He led the team to 2–4 regular season record, but advanced to the championship game in the playoffs, where they were defeated, 11–10, by the Baltimore Thunder.

== Later life ==
Around 1988, Beardmore became the athletic director at Anne Arundel Community College. In 1992, he was the Anne Arundel men's lacrosse co-head coach alongside fellow Maryland alumnus and former quarterback Alan Pastrana.

Beardmore was inducted into the National Lacrosse Hall of Fame in 1980 and the University of Maryland Athletic Hall of Fame in 1988.

His son, Jim Beardmore, was also a lacrosse coach and player. He attended Maryland where he played as a goalie under head coach Dick Edell.

Buddy had resided in Severna Park, Maryland with his wife Phyllis, living near his daughter Susie and her five children, his son Stevie and his two daughters. He died on January 20, 2016, from the effects of Parkinson's disease.
