= Maryland–Navy lacrosse rivalry =

College sports rivalry

- Maryland Terrapins Navy Midshipmen
- First meeting: April 12, 1924; Maryland 5, Navy 3
- Latest meeting: February 23, 2019; Maryland 14, Navy 9

Statistics
- Total meetings: 94
- All-time series: Maryland leads, 60–33–1
- Largest victory: Maryland, 21–7 (1998)
- Longest win streak: Maryland, 11 (1993–2003)
- Current win streak: Maryland, 10 (2010–Present)

The Maryland–Navy lacrosse rivalry is an intercollegiate lacrosse rivalry between the Maryland Terrapins and Navy Midshipmen. Hailing from College Park and Annapolis, the state rivals have another historical series in college football, known as the Crab Bowl Classic. In lacrosse, the teams first met in 1924 and have met annually since 1927, aside from brief interruptions due to World War II and the COVID-19 pandemic. Prior to Maryland upgrading its club team to varsity in 1924, the teams met seven additional times, with Navy winning five of those. However, these do not count in the official record. Traditionally taking place in either April or May, the game has been moved up to the earlier months of the season to accommodate the teams' increasing difficulty to schedule non-conference games, compounded by the expansion of the Patriot League and Maryland's decision to join the Big Ten Conference. Despite concern that the series may have to be postponed indefinitely, the teams have maintain the annual series, though it has at times been played mid-week rather than as the weekend headliner.

Navy owns 17 national championships and Maryland claims 13, four of which (1973, 1975, 2017, 2022) have come in the NCAA Division I Tournament era. The teams rank No. 1 and No. 2 in terms of the number of first team All-Americans produced, while all four of the winningest head coaches by percentage roamed the sidelines of the two schools. The rivalry is the second-longest in Terps history, only trailing its series with Johns Hopkins. On Navy's side, the rivalry is also its second-longest series, only trailing its all-sports rivals Army. Through 2020, Maryland leads the series 60–33–1.

== Series history ==
=== Early years (1920s through 1960s) ===
The first game in series history was played in Washington, D.C. in 1924. Maryland won by two goals. A three-year gap would take place before the next meeting, which then gained an annual spot on the schools' schedules. Maryland dominated early on, winning all but four contests before the series went on hiatus in 1941. The teams would meet again in 1943, before resuming on annual basis for good in 1946. After five straight Maryland victories, Navy embarked on its most successful period in both the rivalry and program history. The 1960s featured eight straight national titles for the Midshipmen, from 1960 to 1967. The last of these would be shared with their rivals from College Park and Johns Hopkins, though the meeting between the two went the way of Navy. Each game during this stretch was won by the Midshipmen until Maryland ended the streak in 1968.

=== Early NCAA era (1970s through 1990s) ===
The introduction of the NCAA Division I Men's Lacrosse Championship in 1971 brought new stakes to the rivalry. During the regular season, Navy downed the Terps 10–5 at home, but would lose a Final Four rematch on the road. Maryland held on to a four-goal halftime lead to advance to the inaugural title game, which they would lose to Cornell. The current USILA polling system began in 1973, with #4 UMD taking the first ranked meeting over the #4 Midshipmen. This would begin a stretch of 15 straight games with the two programs ranked in the Top 10 and 28 consecutive with both ranked in the polls. As of 2020, 43 of 52 meetings since the introduction of the polls have been between two ranked teams.

The 1970s would feature three more postseason meetings, all won by Maryland. In 1975, the teams would meet for a national title. In the Final Four, Maryland had blown out Washington & Lee 15–5, despite being questioned for their inclusion in the tournament, while Navy upset the number 1 seed, Cornell. After grabbing a five-goal lead after the first quarter, the Midshipmen held on after a furious rally from the Big Red. The final was the 50th all-time meeting between the Terps and Navy, held at Homewood Field, the home field of their mutual rival Johns Hopkins. Though the Midshipmen upset Maryland during the regular season matchup, the Terps would get revenge. After a combined 11 goal first period, Maryland would pull ahead before halftime with a 9–6 lead. The third quarter featured eight more goals and Maryland carried a 13–10 advantage into the fourth. Using seven goals, the Terps pulled away to win 20–13, the highest scoring game in the series since 34 goals were scored in a 1962 Navy victory. 120 total shots were launched during the game, the second-most of the 1975 tournament. The game remains tied for the second-highest all-time game between the two programs and the highest-scoring title game in NCAA history. In the title game, Frank Urso led the Terps with five goals, pushing him over the 100 goal mark, while Bob DeSimone led the Midshipmen with four.

1976 would feature a title game rematch in the Final Four, with 1-seeded Maryland dominating Navy 22–11, tying the previous postseason game with 33 goals scored. The Terps blitzed Navy in the first quarter, hanging 10 goals on the Midshipmen. While Navy played the rest of the game fairly evenly with the Terps, only being outscored 12–10, the initial surge had put the game out of reach. Ed Mullen scored 7 for undefeated Maryland, which would be dealt its first and only loss of the season in the national championship game by 16–0 Cornell. Maryland would win each of the next three meetings against Navy prior to their most recent postseason meeting in 1979. Held in College Park, the Final Four game featured #2 Maryland and #3 Navy. Despite outshooting the Terps, Navy was unable to overcome a 7–4 halftime deficit and would fall 15–10. Maryland would again fall in the title game, this time to fellow state rival Johns Hopkins.

The following year, Navy would capture its first victory over the Terps in eight tries. The Midshipmen would win four of the next six after their 1979 postseason defeat. After several more years of fierce battles, a 1993 loss to Maryland would portend poor fortunes for Navy in the years to come. From that game, Maryland won 11 straight matchups. Several games early in the streak were convincing UMD victories, including an eight-goal victory in 1995 and a dominant 21–7 victory in 1998. The 14 goal margin marks the largest differential in series history. However, that game would shift the series to an even more bitter stretch for Navy. The next four meetings would all end in the same score: six to five. The Midshipmen came close each time but were unable to come out with a victory. The 1996 meeting featured a late rally by Navy to dig themselves out of a four-goal hole, but just fell short of upsetting the #2 Terps, losing 11 to 10. During this 11 game streak, six of the losses came by just a single goal, amplifying the heartbreak. UMD ended the 1990s with a 9 to 1 advantage for the decade, their best ever in terms of winning percentage in the rivalry to that point.

=== Recent years (2000s to present) ===
In 2004, Navy overcame their struggles against their rivals, upsetting #1 Maryland on the road. The Midshipmen would carry that momentum throughout the season, ultimately finishing as the national runner-up. In addition to that victory, Navy would prevail in four of the next five meetings. In 2005, before a record Annapolis crowd of 14,124 attended the rivalry, with Navy pulling out a 9–8 victory with a Graham Gill goal with 14 seconds left in the game. This record would be topped two years later and again in 2009 when 15,109 fans attended, also counting as the fifth most-attended home Navy lacrosse game, only trailing its similar rivalry matchup with Johns Hopkins. The only Maryland win during this stretch was an 8–7 double overtime thriller in Annapolis.

While the teams split the 2000s at five victories apiece, the narrative would change in the next decade. Maryland would win all 10 games in the 2010s; the current streak is the second longest in series history. Intrigue was increased with the hiring of current Maryland head coach John Tillman, who spent 12 seasons as an assistant with Navy. The 2016 matchup was the first since 2008 to feature two Top 10 teams. With a balanced scoring attack, the Terps defeated #7 Navy 10–5 in College Park. The most recent game was won by Maryland, a 14 to 9 victory that required a four-goal stretch in the final quarter to pull away from their rivals, pushing Tillman's record against the Midshipmen to a perfect 9 and 0. Significantly in 2020, the game was not played for the first time since World War II. Initially postponed due to a norovirus outbreak among members of the Naval Academy team, the rescheduled game was cancelled along with the entire season by the COVID-19 pandemic.

== Rival accomplishments ==
The following summarizes the accomplishments of the two programs.

Team	Maryland Terrapins	Navy Midshipmen
Pre-NCAA National Titles	9	17
NCAA National Titles	3	0
NCAA Final Four Appearances	26	8
NCAA Tournament Appearances	42	27
NCAA Tournament Record	63–39	17–27
Conference Tournament Titles	6	5
Conference Championships	35	8
Tewaarton Award Recipients	1	0
Lt. Raymond Enners Award Recipients	3	0
Consensus First Team All-Americans	127	105
All-time Program Record	839–276–4	807–366–14
All-time Winning Percentage	.752	.686

== Game results ==
Maryland victories	Navy victories	Tie games

No.	Date	Location	Winner	Score
1	1924	Washington, DC	Maryland	5–3
2	1927	Annapolis, MD	Navy	6–2
3	1928	College Park, MD	Maryland	3–2
4	1929	Annapolis, MD	Navy	4–3
5	1930	Annapolis, MD	Maryland	5–1
6	1931	Annapolis, MD	Maryland	8–1
7	1932	Annapolis, MD	Maryland	4–2
8	1933	College Park, MD	Maryland	7–3
9	1934	Annapolis, MD	Tie	6–6
10	1935	College Park, MD	Maryland	6–5
11	1936	Annapolis, MD	Maryland	7–2
12	1937	Annapolis, MD	Maryland	6–2
13	1938	Annapolis, MD	Navy	8–7
14	1939	Annapolis, MD	Maryland	5–3
15	1940	Annapolis, MD	Maryland	12–3
16	1943	Annapolis, MD	Navy	9–8
17	1946	Annapolis, MD	Navy	11–4
18	1947	Annapolis, MD	Navy	10–9
19	1948	College Park, MD	Maryland	8–3
20	1949	Annapolis, MD	Navy	14–4
21	1950	College Park, MD	Navy	6–5
22	1951	Annapolis, MD	Maryland	10–9
23	1952	College Park, MD	Navy	10–9^{OT}
24	1953	Annapolis, MD	Maryland	10–9
25	1954	College Park, MD	Navy	12–7
26	1955	Annapolis, MD	Maryland	9–8
27	1956	Annapolis, MD	Maryland	10–5
28	1957	Annapolis, MD	Maryland	5–4
29	1958	College Park, MD	Maryland	17–10
30	1959	Annapolis, MD	Maryland	15–8
31	1960	College Park, MD	Navy	15–14
32	1961	Annapolis, MD	Navy	9–7^{OT}

No.	Date	Location	Winner	Score
33	1962	College Park, MD	Navy	22–12
34	1963	Annapolis, MD	Navy	17–9
35	1964	College Park, MD	Navy	11–3
36	1965	Annapolis, MD	Navy	13–7
37	1966	College Park, MD	Navy	11–9
38	1967	Annapolis, MD	Navy	10–8
39	1968	College Park, MD	Maryland	5–3
40	1969	Annapolis, MD	Navy	7–6
41	1970	College Park, MD	Navy	6–3
42	1971	Annapolis, MD	Navy	10–5
43	1971	College Park, MD	Maryland	10–7
44	1972	College Park, MD	Maryland	12–10
45	1973	Annapolis, MD	#3 Maryland	14–7
46	1974	College Park, MD	#1 Maryland	12–7
47	1975	Annapolis, MD	#5 Navy	10–9
48	1975	Baltimore, MD	#4 Maryland	20–13
49	1976	College Park, MD	#2 Maryland	14–10
50	1976	College Park, MD	#1 Maryland	22–11
51	1977	Annapolis, MD	#2 Maryland	16–13
52	1978	College Park, MD	#2 Maryland	16–13
53	1979	Annapolis, MD	#2 Maryland	17–12
54	1979	College Park, MD	#2 Maryland	15–10
55	1980	College Park, MD	#7 Navy	11–9
56	1981	Annapolis, MD	#8 Navy	16–15
57	1982	College Park, MD	#7 Maryland	12–10
58	1983	Annapolis, MD	#15 Navy	10–9
59	1984	College Park, MD	#12 Maryland	7–4
60	1985	Annapolis, MD	#13 Navy	7–5
61	1986	College Park, MD	#2 Maryland	11–8
62	1987	Annapolis, MD	#1 Maryland	17–5
63	1988	College Park, MD	#14 Navy	8–7^{OT}
64	1989	Annapolis, MD	#4 Maryland	6–5

No.	Date	Location	Winner	Score
65	1990	College Park, MD	#12 Maryland	18–6
66	1991	Annapolis, MD	#7 Maryland	10–6
67	1992	College Park, MD	#13 Navy	11–3
68	1993	Annapolis, MD	#13 Maryland	11–10
69	1994	College Park, MD	#8 Maryland	11–4
70	1995	Annapolis, MD	#3 Maryland	19–11
71	1996	College Park, MD	#2 Maryland	11–10
72	1997	Annapolis, MD	#4 Maryland	10–5
73	1998	College Park, MD	#1 Maryland	21–7
74	1999	Annapolis, MD	#7 Maryland	6–5
75	2000	College Park, MD	#7 Maryland	6–5
76	2001	Annapolis, MD	#6 Maryland	6–5
77	2002	College Park, MD	#6 Maryland	6–5
78	2003	Annapolis, MD	#4 Maryland	9–7
79	2004	College Park, MD	#4 Navy	9–6
80	2005	Annapolis, MD	#8 Navy	9–8
81	2006	College Park, MD	#11 Navy	7–6
82	2007	Annapolis, MD	#11 Maryland	8–7^{2OT}
83	2008	College Park, MD	#9 Navy	5–4
84	2009	Annapolis, MD	#17 Navy	10–4
85	2010	College Park, MD	#4 Maryland	11–9
86	2011	Annapolis, MD	#7 Maryland	10–4
87	2012	College Park, MD	#12 Maryland	13–6
88	2013	Annapolis, MD	#1 Maryland	11–8
89	2014	College Park, MD	#8 Maryland	12–6
90	2015	Annapolis, MD	#8 Maryland	8–1
91	2016	College Park, MD	#5 Maryland	10–5
92	2017	Annapolis, MD	#2 Maryland	15–12
93	2018	College Park, MD	#1 Maryland	10–4
94	2019	Annapolis, MD	#3 Maryland	14–9
Series: Maryland leads 60–33–1
