= Alan Pastrana =

American football player (1944–2021)

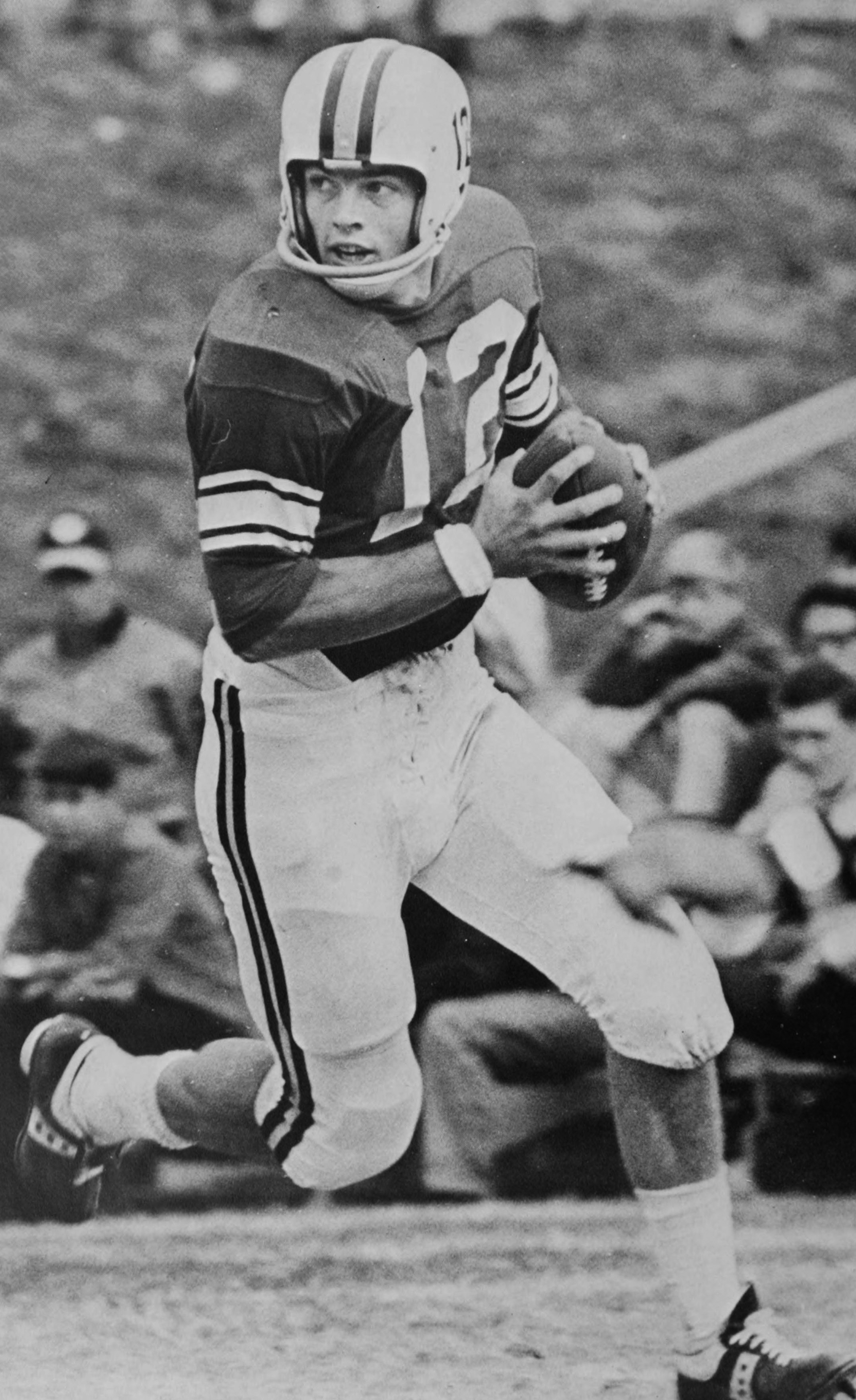
- Pastrana at Maryland in 1966

No. 12
- Position: Quarterback

Personal information
- Born: November 20, 1944; Annapolis, Maryland, U.S.
- Died: April 8, 2021 (aged 76); Annapolis, Maryland, U.S.
- Listed height: 6 ft 1 in (1.85 m)
- Listed weight: 190 lb (86 kg)

Career information
- High school: Annapolis
- College: Maryland (1965–1968)
- NFL draft: 1969: 11th round, 270th overall pick

Career history

Playing
- Denver Broncos (1969–1970)

Coaching
- Anne Arundel (1973–1979) Assistant coach; Anne Arundel (1980–1989) Head coach; Severn School (1993) Head coach

Career NFL/AFL statistics
- Passing attempts: 75
- Passing completions: 29
- Completion percentage: 38.7%
- TD–INT: 1–9
- Passing yards: 420
- Passer rating: 22.5
- Stats at Pro Football Reference

Charles Alan Pastrana (November 20, 1944 – April 8, 2021) was an American football quarterback. He played college football for the University of Maryland from 1965 to 1968. In 1966, he set the Atlantic Coast Conference record for single-season passing touchdowns with 17. At Maryland, Pastrana also played on the lacrosse team and was named a first-team All-American defenseman in 1966. The Denver Broncos of the National Football League (NFL) selected Pastrana in the 11th round of the 1969 NFL/AFL draft. He played for Denver for two seasons, including three games as the starting quarterback. After his playing career, Pastrana coached football, lacrosse and wrestling at Anne Arundel Community College, where he taught as an associate professor, and coached football at the Severn School.

== Early life ==
Pastrana was born on November 20, 1944, in Annapolis, Maryland, to a father from Puerto Rico and an American mother of Swiss ancestry. He attended Annapolis High School, where he served as the captain of the football, lacrosse, and wrestling teams. After he graduated from Annapolis High in 1964, Pastrana attended the college preparatory Severn School.

== College years ==
Pastrana enrolled at the University of Maryland, where he earned three letters on the football team in 1965, 1966, and 1968, and two on the lacrosse team in 1966 and 1967. He played lacrosse as a defenseman under head coach John Howard. After the 1966 season, the United States Intercollegiate Lacrosse Association named him a first-team All-American.

In 1965, he played football on defense as a linebacker. The following season, Lou Saban took over as head coach from Tom Nugent, and held open quarterback try-outs, which included everyone who had played the position in high school. Early in the season, Saban dismissed several players "not good enough to play for Maryland", including former starting quarterback Phil Petry, and the job went to Pastrana. Saban employed a pro-style offense.

After losses to Penn State and Syracuse, Pastrana led the underdog Maryland team to a surprising three-game winning streak over Duke, West Virginia, and South Carolina, which improbably placed the Terrapins atop the Atlantic Coast Conference and into the bowl game picture. Maryland, however, lost its final four games of the season to finish 4–6 and 3–3 in the ACC. In the penultimate game against Virginia, Pastrana broke the ACC record with his 13th and 14th touchdown passes of the season. Florida State routed Maryland in the season finale, 45–21, where Pastrana's passing accounted for all three Terrapin scores in a failed second-half comeback bid. He finished the year with 102 completions on 195 attempts for 1,499 yards and 17 touchdowns. After the season, Saban left to become head coach for the Denver Broncos and he was replaced by former Maryland All-American guard Bob Ward.

In April 1967, Pastrana suffered a serious injury when he tore his medial collateral ligament and cartilage in his knee during a spring football practice. The injury required surgery, and he was lost for the 1967 season. Pastrana returned for his final year of eligibility in 1968, but had "only a mediocre season", although he "kept the team spirits high with his never-say-die attitude." Maryland finished with a 2–8 record. Pastrana recorded 81 completions on 172 attempts for 1,053 yards and six touchdowns.

During his collegiate career, Pastrana set the school record for season efficiency rating at 131.29 in 1966, which was broken by Bob Avellini in 1974. Pastrana also set school records with 23 career passing touchdowns and 17 single-season passing touchdowns, both of which were later broken by Boomer Esiason.

== Professional career ==
=== Denver Broncos ===
The Denver Broncos selected Pastrana in the eleventh round of the 1969 NFL/AFL draft with the 270th overall pick. In 1969, he saw action in two games and did not attempt a pass, but did have one reception for 15 yards. The following season, he played in five games, including three as starter in relief of Steve Tensi, who had suffered a shoulder injury. Against the San Diego Chargers, Pastrana drove the team to the opposing 35-yard line and within field goal range, but he was knocked unconscious and could not call a crucial timeout. As the offensive captain, he was the only person authorized to do so under the rules at the time, and the clock expired to result in a 17–17 stalemate. The rules regarding timeouts were changed after the season. In 1970, Pastrana completed 29 of 75 pass attempts for 420 yards and one touchdown, rushed 14 times for 89 yards and one touchdown, threw nine interceptions, and was sacked eight times. Five of his interceptions came against the Kansas City Chiefs. Pastrana suffered a severe concussion that effectively ended his career near the end of the 1970 season and also heavily altered his personality. In the 1971 offseason, head coach Lou Saban held try-outs with seven quarterbacks. By the end of August, Pastrana made the cut to the final three, alongside Don Horn and Steve Ramsey, and was the only quarterback remaining on the team from the prior season. Pastrana, however, was cut in early September.

=== After the NFL ===
Pastrana became an assistant football coach at Anne Arundel Community College in 1973. From 1980 to 1989, he served as the head coach and directed a multiple-I and pro-set offense until the school discontinued the program. He also served as a co-head coach of the Anne Arundel Community College men's lacrosse team alongside former Maryland coach Bud Beardmore.

In 1993, the Severn School hired Pastrana as its football coach, but he resigned after just three games amid complaints from parents and players over his laid-back coaching style. Some were concerned that Pastrana visited with friends in the stands during the halftime of two losses. In 2001, Pastrana was an associate professor of health and education at Anne Arundel Community College, where he was still teaching as of 2006. Pastrana has been inducted into the Anne Arundel County Sports Hall of Fame.

== Personal life ==
Pastrana and his wife Diane (née Laudenslager) had two daughters, Shannon Overend and Lisa Brabazon. He was the uncle of stuntman and motorsports competitor Travis Pastrana. Another nephew, Greg Powell, played football at Maryland as a walk-on in 2005 and 2006. His nephew, Darren Pastrana, entered the United States Naval Academy in 2008, where he played on the lacrosse team. His niece, Kim Pastrana, played women's lacrosse at Duke University from 2005 to 2007.

Pastrana died on April 8, 2021, of pneumonia that stemmed from COVID-19.
