= Dino Mattessich =

American lacrosse coach & player

Biographical details
- Born: Croatia

Playing career
- 1971–1974: Maryland

Coaching career (HC unless noted)
- 1977: U. of Baltimore (asst.)
- 1978–1979: U. of Baltimore
- 1980: Maryland (asst.)
- 1981–1983: Maryland
- 2006–2008: Connecticut

Head coaching record
- Overall: 26–15 (varsity)

Accomplishments and honors

Awards
- 2006 PCLL Coach of the Year

Dominick A. "Dino" Mattessich is a Croatian-American university administrator and former college lacrosse coach and player. He served as the head coach for the University of Maryland and University of Baltimore varsity lacrosse teams and for the University of Connecticut club team. He has worked in collegiate athletic administration for over 20 years and is currently the deputy director of athletics at Hofstra University.

== Early life and college career ==
Mattessich was born in the former Yugoslavia, in what is now Croatia, and later emigrated to Freeport, New York. As a freshman at Freeport High School, he was told that he would not make the varsity track team, and told to try playing lacrosse instead, a sport he would ultimately excel in.

Mattessich played lacrosse at the University of Maryland from 1971 to 1974, including on the team that won the national championship tournament in 1973. He graduated in 1974 with a bachelor's degree in physical education.

== Coaching and administrative career ==
In 1977, Mattessich served as an assistant coach at the University of Baltimore under Chip Silverman, who had agreed to coach the team for one season after the departure of former head coach Dick Edell. Another UB assistant, Steve Hamp, explained the relationship as, "Chip really wasn't the X's and O's guy; that was assistant coach Dino Mattessich. Chip was more of the motivator." The following season, Mattessich took over as Baltimore's head coach.

In 1980, Mattessich served as an assistant lacrosse coach at Maryland. In June 1980, he was promoted to replace Bud Beardmore as the school's head coach. He served in that position from 1981 to 1983, and compiled a 26–15 record.

He then served for twelve years as an associate athletic director at Towson University in Towson, Maryland. Following his time at Towson, Mattessich was an associate athletic director at the University of Maine, where he worked under athletic director Sue Tyler, former Maryland women's lacrosse and field hockey coach. Tyler appointed Mattessich as head of the search committee that selected John Giannini as the Maine men's basketball head coach in 1996. In 2001, he left Maine for the University of Connecticut to take a position as an associate director of athletics. Mattessich's tenure at UConn coincides with what has arguably been the most successful era of UConn athletics in the university's history, including multiple national championships in men's and women's basketball, Bowl victories in football, Big East Championships in field hockey, soccer and baseball, and an increased commitment to ice hockey.

In 2006, Mattessich became the head coach of the MCLA affiliated club lacrosse team at the University of Connecticut. His son Brian, an attackmen on the team, played a role in his decision to volunteer his time as head coach. "I did it to spend time with my son, Brian, and to give the kids a good experience." His first season as head coach the program attained its first-ever MCLA National Ranking and Mattessich was named the Pioneer Collegiate Lacrosse League Coach of the Year. In 2008, one of Mattessich's former players at UConn said that he "runs the program like a Division I team, and the intense offseason conditioning focuses on skill development and team commitment. That is a big challenge for players, but it has paid off on the field." Brian Mattessich took over as head coach in 2009, and Mattessich continues to work at UConn as the senior associate director of athletics, where he manages the department's financial and internal operations, and is the sport supervisor for several sports, including Ice Hockey.

Mattessich provided the inspiration for a lacrosse player depicted on a 51-cent Canadian stamp issued in 2006 in commemoration of the World Lacrosse Championship. The illustration was based on a photograph of Mattessich taken by Bob Rothgaber during the 1974 Maryland–Hopkins NCAA tournament final that was used on the cover of Lacrosse: Technique and Tradition by Bob Scott. The stamp depicts the player in a Canadian national team uniform.
