= Jack Faber =

American sports coach and microbiologist (1903–1994)

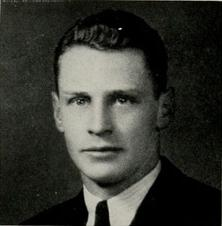
- Faber at Maryland in 1928

Biographical details
- Born: January 13, 1903; Harrisburg, Pennsylvania, U.S.
- Died: January 14, 1994 (aged 91); Silver Spring, Maryland, U.S.

Playing career

Lacrosse
- 1926–1927: Maryland
- Positions: Attackman, Out Home

Coaching career (HC unless noted)

Lacrosse
- 1928–1929: Maryland
- 1930–1963: Maryland (co-HC)

Football
- 1933–1934: Maryland (assistant)
- 1935: Maryland
- 1940–1941: Maryland

Head coaching record
- Overall: 249–57 (lacrosse); 12–13–4 (football)

Accomplishments and honors

Championships
- Lacrosse; 8 USILA (1928, 1936, 1937, 1939, 1940, 1955, 1956, 1959); 9 ACC (1955–1961, 1963, 1965)

Awards
- USILA Coach of the Year (1959)

John Edgar Faber Jr. (January 13, 1903 – January 14, 1994) was an American microbiologist and college football and lacrosse coach at the University of Maryland. Faber served as the Maryland lacrosse coach from 1928 to 1963, during which time he compiled a 249–57 record and secured numerous national and conference championships. Faber was inducted into the National Lacrosse Hall of Fame in 1963. He coached the Maryland football team in 1935 and again, as a co-head coach alongside Al Heagy and Al Woods, from 1940 to 1941. He compiled a 12–13–4 record in football.

== Early life ==
Faber was born in Harrisburg, Pennsylvania on January 13, 1903, and attended Central High School in Washington, D.C. He then went on to college at the University of Maryland, where he played on the Maryland lacrosse team, earning letters in 1926 and 1927, and the basketball team, earning letters from 1924 to 1927. The United States Intercollegiate Lacrosse Association (USILA) named Faber an honorable mention All-American as an inside attackman in 1926 and a third-team All-American at the out home position in 1927.

== Professional career ==
From the University of Maryland, Faber earned a B.S. in 1926, a M.S. in 1928, and a Ph.D. in bacteriology in 1937. In 1945, he was appointed the head of his alma mater's Department of Microbiology, a position he held for 18 years. During World War II, Faber joined the United States Army and served from 1942 to 1946, attaining the rank of major. He spent three years working at the Walter Reed Army Medical Center in Washington, D.C.

While teaching bacteriology at Maryland, Faber also held coaching duties. He served as the head coach for the Maryland lacrosse team from 1928 to 1963. During his tenure, Faber's lacrosse teams compiled a 249–57 record and secured eight outright or shared USILA national championships and nine Atlantic Coast Conference (ACC) championships. From 1930 onward, Faber shared coaching duties with Albert Heagy, with the former running the offense and the latter the defense. In 1936, Faber led Maryland to capture the first Wingate Memorial Trophy, the national championship bestowed by the USILA. The following year, they shared the title with Princeton. In the inaugural North-South Senior All-Star Game in 1940, Faber coached the South team, which lost to the North team coached by Princeton's William F. Logan, 6–5. He also coached all-star teams in 1946 and 1956. In 1955 and 1956, Faber led Maryland to back-to-back 11–0 seasons, with the only close matches coming against period powerhouse Navy, in 1955, and the highly successful Mount Washington Lacrosse Club, 12–11 in 1956. In 1959, Maryland finished with a 10–1 mark as USILA co-champions alongside Army and Johns Hopkins, and Faber was named the USILA Coach of the Year.

Faber also served on the football staff. He became the assistant field coach under Curly Byrd in 1933. Byrd was able to devote less time to the team because of his duties as university vice president. In 1930, Faber enticed Bosey Berger, Maryland's first basketball All-American, to join the football team with the promise of free late night dining hall meals. In 1935, Faber took over as head coach when Byrd was promoted to university president. Faber continued to employ his predecessor's pass-oriented "Byrd system" and hired Richmond head coach Frank Dobson as an assistant. Despite facing "an almost suicidal schedule", Faber's veteran team led by back Bill Guckeyson compiled a 7–2–2 record to finish in third place in the Southern Conference. Faber was succeeded as head football coach by Dobson in 1936, but in turn, replaced him as a co-head coach alongside Al Heagy and Al Woods in 1940 and 1941. Those teams finished with 2–6–1 and 3–5–1 records, respectively, to bring Faber's combined football coaching record to 12–13–4. The coaching trio was subsequently replaced by Clark Shaughnessy, who two seasons prior had orchestrated a remarkable one-year turnaround at Stanford using a revolutionary version of the T formation. Faber also spent time as an assistant basketball coach at Maryland, and in 1932, filled in for head coach Burton Shipley who had fallen ill. Faber served two terms as a president of the ACC.

== Later life ==
He retired from the University of Maryland in 1963 but continued teaching Epidemiology into the 1970s. Faber was inducted into the National Lacrosse Hall of Fame that year and into the University of Maryland Athletic Hall of Fame in 1983. He survived his wife of 62 years, Olyure née Hammack, who died in 1992. Faber died of pneumonia two years later on January 14, 1994, and was interred at Arlington National Cemetery. The University of Maryland Alumni Association Hall of Fame posthumously inducted Faber in 2000. In 2003, Maryland established the Faber Memorial Men's Lacrosse Scholarship Endowment Fund through the Maryland Educational Foundation, Inc. to award scholarships to men's lacrosse players.

== Head coaching record ==
=== Football ===
Year	Team	Overall	Conference	Standing	Bowl/playoffs
Maryland Terrapins (Southern Conference) (1935)
1935	Maryland	7–2–2	3–1–1	3rd	
Maryland Terrapins (Southern Conference) (1940–1941)
1940	Maryland	2–6–1	0–1–1	12th	
1941	Maryland	3–5–1	1–2	T–11th	
Maryland:		12–13–4	4–4–2		
Total:		12–13–4			

== See also ==
- List of college men's lacrosse career coaching wins leaders
