= Al Heagy =

Chemist and lacrosse coach (1906-1990)

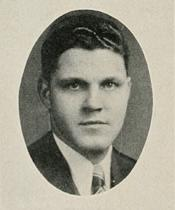
- Heagy as coach in 1935

Biographical details
- Born: December 3, 1906; Rockville, Maryland, U.S.
- Died: April 1, 1990 (aged 83); Cheverly, Maryland, U.S.

Playing career
- 1928–1930: Maryland
- Position: Defenseman

Coaching career (HC unless noted)
- 1931–1963: Maryland (co-HC)
- 1964–1965: Maryland

Head coaching record
- Overall: 245–57–7 (includes record as co-head coach)

Accomplishments and honors

Championships
- 1936 USILA National Championship; 1937 USILA National Co-Championship; 1939 USILA National Championship; 1940 USILA National Championship; 1955 USILA National Championship; 1956 USILA National Championship; 1959 USILA National Co-Championship; 1955 Atlantic Coast Conference Championship; 1956 Atlantic Coast Conference Championship; 1957 Atlantic Coast Conference Championship; 1958 Atlantic Coast Conference Championship; 1959 Atlantic Coast Conference Championship; 1960 Atlantic Coast Conference Championship; 1961 Atlantic Coast Conference Championship; 1963 Atlantic Coast Conference Championship; 1965 Atlantic Coast Conference Championship

Albert B. Heagy (December 3, 1906 – April 1, 1990) was an American chemist, educator, politician, and college lacrosse player and coach. Alongside, Jack Faber, he was the co-head coach of the University of Maryland lacrosse team from 1931 to 1963, and the head coach from 1964 to 1965, and amassed a combined record of 245–57–7. During that time, Maryland secured six outright national championships, two shared national championships, and nine Atlantic Coast Conference championships. He was inducted into the National Lacrosse Hall of Fame in 1965. Heagy also served as the Maryland state chemist and the mayor of University Park.

== Early life ==
Heagy was born in 1906 in Rockville, Maryland. He attended Western High School, where he played football and basketball for three years. Heagy served as the basketball team captain as a senior. He graduated from Western High School in 1926.

Heagy attended college at the University of Maryland, where he earned a Bachelor of Science degree in 1930. While there, he earned nine varsity letters on the football, basketball, and lacrosse teams. In 1929, the United States Intercollegiate Lacrosse Association named Heagy an honorable mention All-American at inside defense. In 1930, the USILA named him to the first team at first defense. At Maryland, Heagy was also three-time class president, a member of the Sigma Nu fraternity, and a member of the Omicron Delta Kappa honor society.

== Coaching career ==
After graduation, Heagy assisted Maryland head coach Jack Faber as a "co-head coach" responsible for running the team's defense. From 1931 to 1963, Heagy served as co-coach of the Maryland lacrosse team alongside Jack Faber. During that time period, Faber and Heagy led the Terrapins to a 224–52–2 record. After Faber retired in 1963, Heagy took over as the team's sole head coach in 1964 and 1965. In those two seasons, he amassed a record of 21–5.

== Professional career ==
In August 1930, Heagy began working as a chemist for the State Inspection Service. He rose through the ranks and was appointed the state chemist for the Maryland Department of Chemistry on February 1, 1962, while at the same time serving on the faculty at the University of Maryland.

Heagy also held offices with the United States Intercollegiate Lacrosse Association, the State of Maryland Athletic Hall of Fame, the Arts and Sciences Executive Committee, Board of Directors of the M Club, and as chairman of the Scholarship Fund. He served as a councilman and mayor of University Park, Maryland, and also held posts with the Prince George's County Heart Association, the Draft Board, the College Park Rotary Club, the Parent-Teachers Association, and the Boy Scouts.

== Later life ==
On August 8, 1940, Heagy married his wife Elizabeth, with whom he had a son and a daughter. Heagy was inducted into the University of Maryland Athletic Hall of Fame in 1984. He retired on June 30, 1986. In 1987, the University of Maryland alumni organization, the M Club, established the Al Heagy Scholarship Fund with a $500 donation from seven members, which included Jack Heise and Hotsy Alperstein. Heagy died from a stroke on April 1, 1990, at Prince George's Hospital Center in Cheverly, Maryland.
