= Maryland Terrapins men's lacrosse =

NCAA Division I lacrosse team

- Founded: 1895; 131 years ago (club); 1924; 102 years ago (varsity)
- University: University of Maryland
- Head coach: John Tillman (since 2011 season)
- Stadium: SECU Stadium (capacity: 54,000)
- Location: College Park, Maryland
- Conference: Big Ten
- Nickname: Terps
- Colors: Red, white, gold, and black

Pre-NCAA era championships
- (9) - 1928, 1936, 1937, 1939, 1940, 1955, 1956, 1959, 1967

NCAA Tournament championships
- (4) - 1973, 1975, 2017, 2022

NCAA Tournament Runner-Up
- (14) - 1971, 1974, 1976, 1979, 1995, 1997, 1998, 2011, 2012, 2015, 2016, 2021, 2024, 2025

NCAA Tournament Final Fours
- (30) - 1971, 1972, 1973, 1974, 1975, 1976, 1977, 1978, 1979, 1983, 1987, 1989, 1991, 1995, 1997, 1998, 2003, 2005, 2006, 2011, 2012, 2014, 2015, 2016, 2017, 2018, 2021, 2022, 2024, 2025

NCAA Tournament Quarterfinals
- (42) - 1971, 1972, 1973, 1974, 1975, 1976, 1977, 1978, 1979, 1981, 1982, 1983, 1986, 1987, 1989, 1991, 1992, 1995, 1996, 1997, 1998, 2000, 2001, 2003, 2004, 2005, 2006, 2008, 2009, 2010, 2011, 2012, 2014, 2015, 2016, 2017, 2018, 2019, 2021, 2022, 2024, 2025

NCAA Tournament appearances
- (47) - 1971, 1972, 1973, 1974, 1975, 1976, 1977, 1978, 1979, 1981, 1982, 1983, 1986, 1987, 1989, 1991, 1992, 1993, 1994, 1995, 1996, 1997, 1998, 2000, 2001, 2003, 2004, 2005, 2006, 2007, 2008, 2009, 2010, 2011, 2012, 2013, 2014, 2015, 2016, 2017, 2018, 2019, 2021, 2022, 2023, 2024, 2025

Conference Tournament championships
- (8) - 1998, 2004, 2005, 2011, 2016, 2017, 2021, 2022

Conference regular season championships
- (38) - 1955, 1956, 1957, 1958, 1959, 1960, 1961, 1963, 1965, 1966, 1967, 1968, 1972, 1973, 1974, 1976, 1977, 1978, 1979, 1980, 1985, 1987, 1989, 1996, 1998, 2001, 2003, 2004, 2009, 2013, 2014, 2015, 2016, 2017, 2018, 2021, 2022, 2026

The Maryland Terrapins men's lacrosse team represents the University of Maryland in National Collegiate Athletic Association (NCAA) Division I lacrosse as a member of the Big Ten Conference. Maryland was a founding member of the Atlantic Coast Conference before withdrawing after the 2014 season.

Since 1924, Maryland has secured numerous national championship honors, including four NCAA tournament championships, eight Wingate Memorial Trophy titles and one United States Intercollegiate Lacrosse Association championship. They have reached 29 NCAA tournament semi-finals since 1971. Maryland is the only major college lacrosse team to have never finished a season with a losing record. The team is currently coached by John Tillman.

Johns Hopkins, located in nearby Baltimore, are considered the Terrapins' biggest rivals. The two schools have played more than 100 times since the series began in 1895, although Maryland does not officially recognize games that occurred prior to lacrosse becoming a varsity sport at Maryland in 1924. In 2015, the rivalry became a conference game, as Hopkins joined the Big Ten Conference as an associate member in lacrosse. The Terps have had the Blue Jays number since joining the Big Ten, boasting a 10–5 head to head record and having won 6 of 7 meetings dating from 2021–2023. Maryland holds a 3–0 record vs. Hopkins in the conference tournament during that time period as well. Other rivals include Virginia, Navy, Loyola, Towson, and UMBC.

== History ==
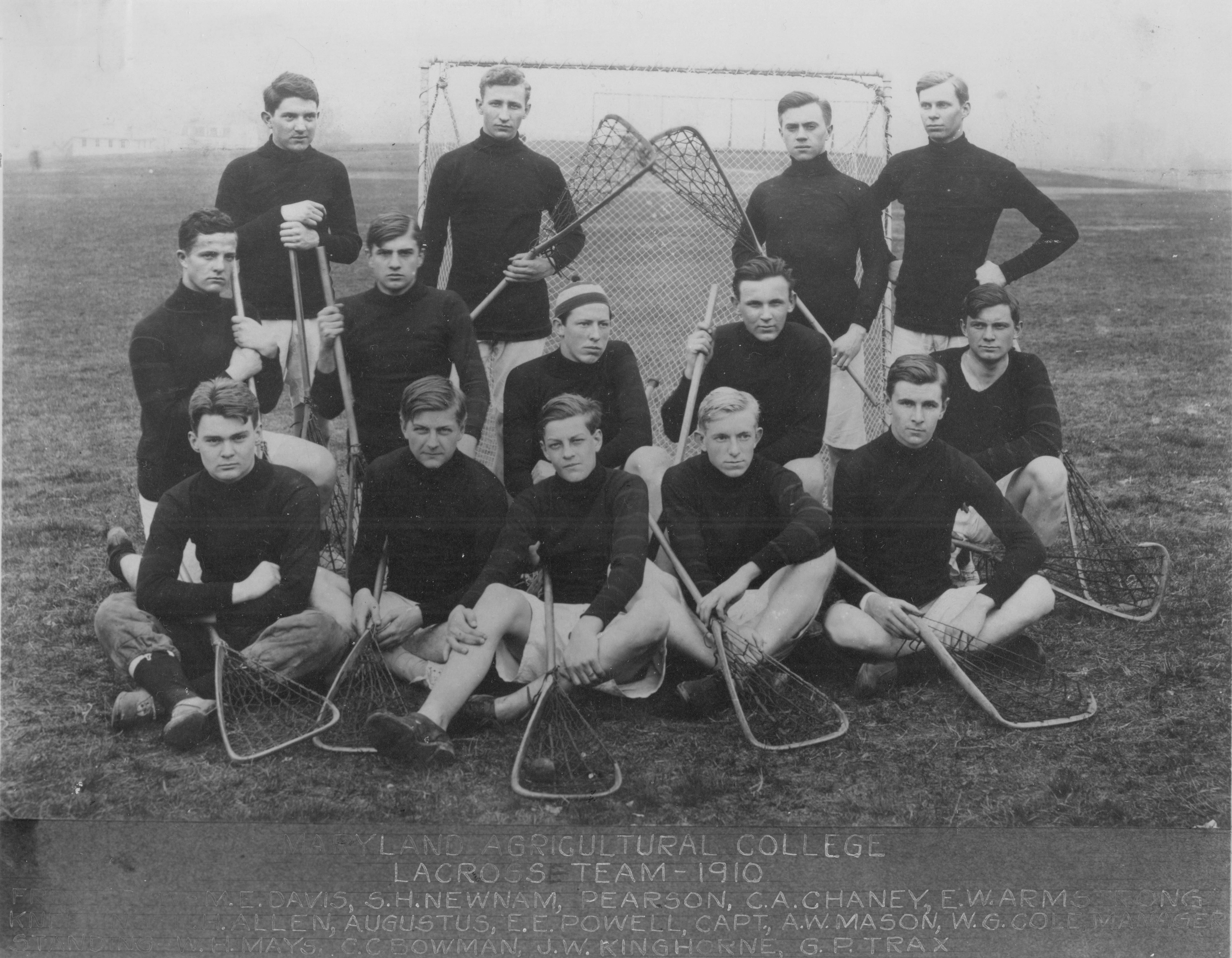
Maryland team of 1910

The Maryland program started as a club team in 1895. During its early years, Maryland teams competed against the best in lacrosse with games on record against Johns Hopkins, Penn State, Navy, Harvard, Cornell and others.

The team was elevated to varsity status in 1924. Since then, Maryland has never finished with a losing record, a feat unmatched by any other major college lacrosse team. The Terrapins have finished four seasons with a winning percentage of .500.

Under the guidance of coach R. V. Truitt, Maryland entered the United States Intercollegiate Lacrosse League (USILL) in 1924. In its first contest in the association, it snapped Navy's 46-game winning streak and then beat undefeated Johns Hopkins, the Southern Division championship team, 4–2. The following season, Maryland captured the Southern Division title by beating the Doug Turnbull-led Hopkins squad, 3–1.

In 1926, the USILL was succeeded by the United States Intercollegiate Lacrosse Association (USILA), which did not have a limitation on the number of member schools. For the next five decades, Maryland remained a national power, alongside Johns Hopkins, Navy, and St. John's. The dominance of these four schools located in the state of Maryland was due in large part to the high caliber of the sport at the interscholastic level. Lacrosse was the preeminent spring sport at the public Baltimore Polytechnic Institute and Baltimore City College, as well as the city's private high schools. The importance of lacrosse was magnified by the lack of any major professional teams in Baltimore until the creation of the Colts in 1947 and the return of the Orioles in 1954.

Maryland finished the 1928 season with a 9–1 record, the loss coming at the hands of Johns Hopkins. Three other association members finished with one loss: Hopkins, Navy, and Rutgers. The four squads were awarded Gold Medals as the best teams in the nation. That year, arrangements were made for the inclusion of a lacrosse exhibition at the 1928 Summer Olympics. American Olympic Committee president General Douglas MacArthur established a committee to organize the country's participation in the lacrosse event. Representation of the United States was determined by a tournament of intercollegiate and amateur teams that involved Maryland, Johns Hopkins, Rutgers, Army, Navy, and the Mount Washington Lacrosse Club. Maryland advanced to the final, where they were defeated by Hopkins in front of 15,000 spectators. In 1929, the undefeated St. John's Johnnies handed Maryland its first homefield loss in thirteen years.

Before the 1932 Summer Olympics in Los Angeles, lacrosse proponents arranged for another exhibition tournament. To decide the representative for the United States, the American Olympic Lacrosse Committee held an eight-team single-elimination tournament featuring Maryland, Johns Hopkins, Syracuse, St. John's, Rutgers, Crescent Athletic Club, Mount Washington Lacrosse Club, and an all-star team composed of American Indian players from the Six Nations. Maryland defeated Mount Washington at Baltimore Stadium in front of 6,000 spectators in a doubleheader that also featured Johns Hopkins narrowly beat St. John's. In the semifinals, a small crowd of 500 watched Maryland beat the Crescents and Hopkins beat Rutgers in foul rainy weather. Hopkins defeated Maryland in the final before a crowd of 5,000 to secure their place as the United States representatives for the Olympics.

In 1936, Maryland coach Jack Faber guided the undefeated Terps to secure the inaugural Wingate Memorial Trophy, awarded to the USILA champions. The next year, Maryland finished undefeated again and shared the national co-championship with William F. Logan's Princeton. Faber led Maryland to back-to-back outright USILA titles in 1939 led by Jim Meade and Rip Hewitt, and in 1940 led by Milton Mulitz and Oscar Nevares.

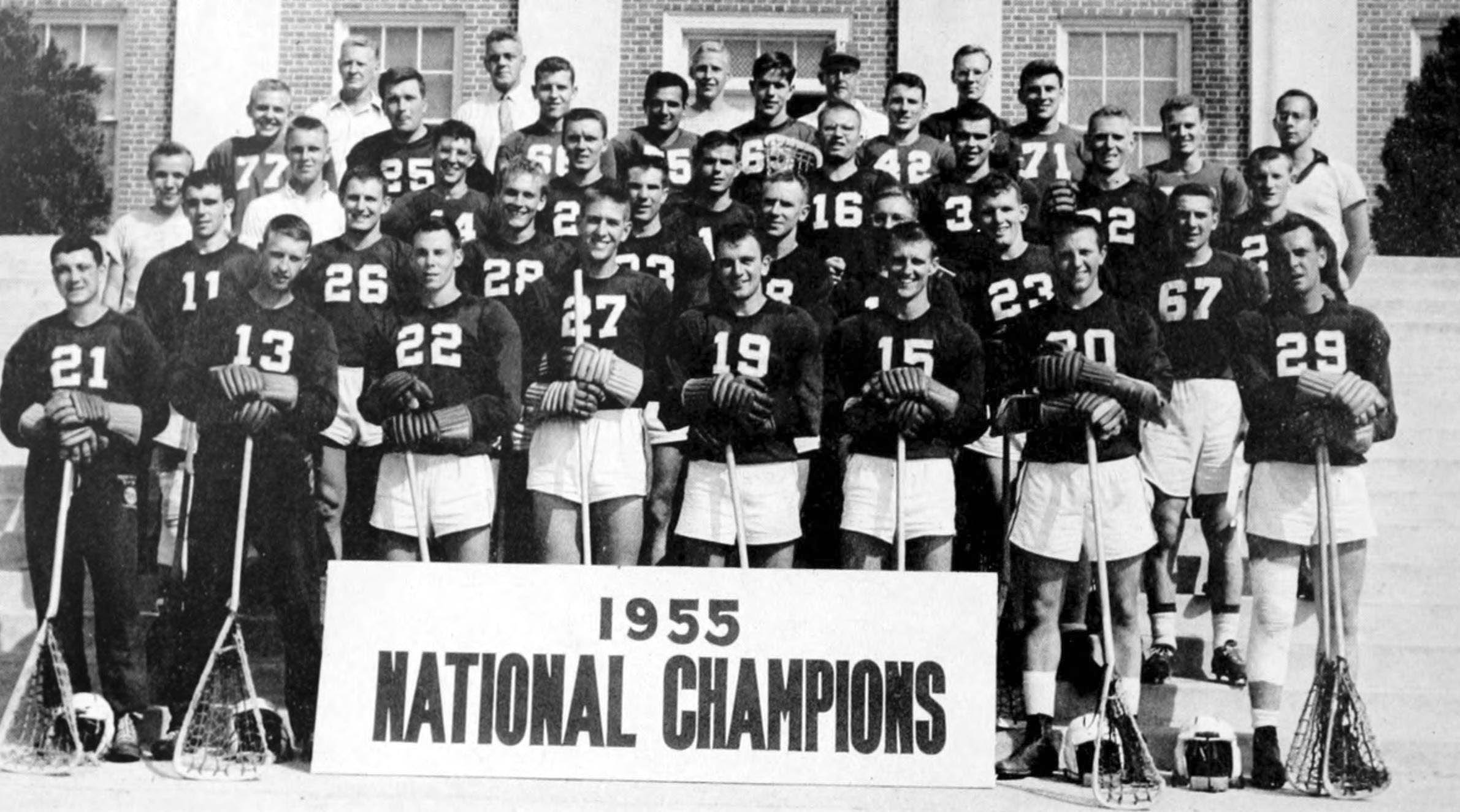
The undefeated 1955 Maryland lacrosse team

In 1955 and 1956, co-head coaches Faber and Al Heagy guided the Terrapins to two more undefeated seasons and consecutive national championships. Maryland split the USILA championship with two other one-loss teams, Army and Johns Hopkins, in 1959.

In 1967, Maryland suffered one loss to Navy, that decade's dominant team, but Hopkins in turn defeated the Midshipmen which resulted in a three-way tie for the championship between the trio.

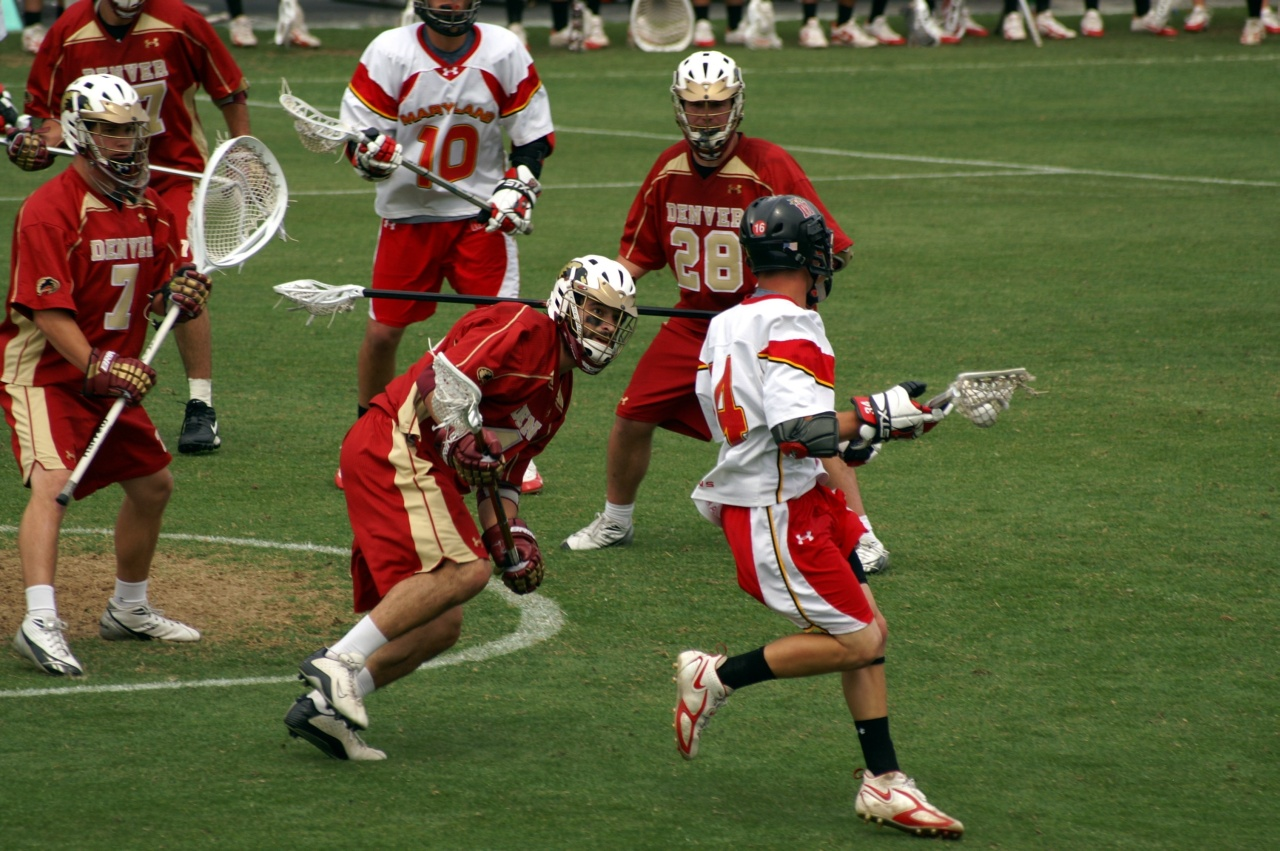
Maryland (white jerseys) in action against Denver in 2006

On March 29, 2009, the Maryland–Virginia regular season match resulted in the longest lacrosse game in NCAA history, extending into seven overtime periods. An unintentional whistle by the officiating staff negated what would have been a game-winning goal by Terrapins attackman Grant Catalino in the first overtime. Virginia went on to win with a goal in the seventh overtime, 10–9, and preserved its perfect record, 11–0, while Maryland slid to 6–3.

In 2011, Maryland defeated first-seeded Duke to recapture the ACC tournament championship after a six-year hiatus. Attackman Grant Catalino was named the tournament MVP.

On May 29, 2017, Maryland defeated 3rd-seeded Ohio State to win its third NCAA national championship (12th overall) and end the national title drought that began after its last championship in 1975.

On May 30, 2022, Maryland defeated 7th-seeded Cornell to win its fourth NCAA national championship (13th overall). Finishing the season at 18–0, the Terrapins became the third undefeated champions since the NCAA tournament expanded to 16 teams and the first since 2006.

== Players ==
Since 1922, a total of 124 first-team All-American honors have been bestowed upon Maryland players. Six Terrapins have received All-American honors each of their four years: Charles Wicker (1953–56), Frank Urso (1973–76), Bob Ott (1976–79), Bob Boniello (1977–80), Peter Worstell (1977–81), and Joe Walters (2003–2008). Frank Urso is one of just four college men's lacrosse players to be named a first-team All-American all four years.

In 2017, Matt Rambo was the first Maryland men's player to receive the Tewaaraton Award for the best men's collegiate lacrosse player in the country. In 2021, Jared Bernhardt became the second Maryland men's player to win the award. In 2022, Logan Wisnauskas became the third Maryland men's player to win the award.

== Coaches ==
Coaching records
Head Coach	Wins	Losses	Ties
R. V. Truitt	22	8	1
Jack Faber	26	4	
Jack Faber & Al Heagy	225	52	2
Al Heagy	21	5	
John Howard	32	7	1
Bud Beardmore	90	26	
Dino Mattessich	26	15	
Dick Edell	171	76	
Dave Cottle	99	45	
John Tillman	181	52	
Total	893	290	4

== Championships ==
=== National championships ===
Starting in 1926, the United States Intercollegiate Lacrosse Association (USILA) began rating college lacrosse teams and awarding gold medals to the top teams. Maryland was the recipient of one of these in 1928, alongside Johns Hopkins, Navy, and Rutgers, all of whom suffered just one regular season collegiate defeat. From 1936, the USILA awarded the Wingate Memorial Trophy to the regular season intercollegiate champions. In 1971, the National Collegiate Athletic Association began hosting a men's lacrosse tournament to determine the national champions.

Year	Type	Coach	Record
1928	USILA Gold Medal (with Johns Hopkins, Navy, and Rutgers)	Jack Faber	9–1
1936	USILA Championship	Jack Faber & Al Heagy	7–0
1937	USILA Co-Championship (with Princeton)	Jack Faber & Al Heagy	7–0
1939	USILA Championship	Jack Faber & Al Heagy	6–1
1940	USILA Championship	Jack Faber & Al Heagy	10–0
1955	USILA Championship	Jack Faber & Al Heagy	11–0
1956	USILA Championship	Jack Faber & Al Heagy	10–0
1959	USILA Co-Championship (with Army and Johns Hopkins)	Jack Faber & Al Heagy	10–1
1967	USILA Co-Championship (with Johns Hopkins)	John Howard	8–1
1973	NCAA Tournament Championship	Bud Beardmore	10–0
1975	NCAA Tournament Championship	Bud Beardmore	8–2
2017	NCAA Tournament Championship	John Tillman	16–3
2022	NCAA Tournament Championship	John Tillman	18–0

=== Conference regular season championships ===
Year	Conference	Coach	Overall record	Conference record
1955	Atlantic Coast Conference	Jack Faber & Al Heagy	11–0	2–0
1956	Atlantic Coast Conference	Jack Faber & Al Heagy	10–0	2–0
1957	Atlantic Coast Conference	Jack Faber & Al Heagy	9–1	2–0
1958	Atlantic Coast Conference	Jack Faber & Al Heagy	8–1	2–0
1959	Atlantic Coast Conference	Jack Faber & Al Heagy	10–1	2–0
1960	Atlantic Coast Conference	Jack Faber & Al Heagy	7–3	2–0
1961	Atlantic Coast Conference	Jack Faber & Al Heagy	6–2	2–0
1963	Atlantic Coast Conference	Jack Faber & Al Heagy	10–2	2–0
1965	Atlantic Coast Conference	Jack Faber & Al Heagy	11–2	3–0
1966	Atlantic Coast Conference	John Howard	9–1	3–0
1967	Atlantic Coast Conference	John Howard	8–1	2–0
1968	Atlantic Coast Conference	John Howard	8–1–1	2–0
1972	Atlantic Coast Conference	Bud Beardmore	8–2	2–0
1973	Atlantic Coast Conference	Bud Beardmore	10–0	3–0
1974	Atlantic Coast Conference	Bud Beardmore	8–2	3–0
1976	Atlantic Coast Conference	Bud Beardmore	10–1	2–0
1977	Atlantic Coast Conference	Bud Beardmore	8–2	3–0
1978	Atlantic Coast Conference	Bud Beardmore	9–2	4–0
1979	Atlantic Coast Conference	Bud Beardmore	9–2	4–0
1980	Atlantic Coast Conference	Bud Beardmore	5–5	3–1
1985	Atlantic Coast Conference	Dick Edell	7–5	2–1
1987	Atlantic Coast Conference	Dick Edell	12–1	3–0
1989	Atlantic Coast Conference	Dick Edell	10–4	3–0
1996	Atlantic Coast Conference	Dick Edell	10–3	2–1
1998	Atlantic Coast Conference	Dick Edell	14–3	3–0
2001	Atlantic Coast Conference	Dick Edell	13–3	2–1
2003	Atlantic Coast Conference	Dave Cottle	12–4	2–1
2004	Atlantic Coast Conference	Dave Cottle	13–3	3–0
2009	Atlantic Coast Conference	Dave Cottle	10–7	2–1
2013	Atlantic Coast Conference	John Tillman	13–5	2–1
2014	Atlantic Coast Conference	John Tillman	13–4	4–1
2015	Big Ten Conference	John Tillman	15–4	4–1
2016	Big Ten Conference	John Tillman	17–3	5–0
2017	Big Ten Conference	John Tillman	16–3	4–1
2018	Big Ten Conference	John Tillman	14–4	4–1
2021	Big Ten Conference	John Tillman	15–1	10–0
2022	Big Ten Conference	John Tillman	18–0	5–0
2026	Big Ten Conference	John Tillman	7–6	3–2

=== Conference tournament championships ===
The Atlantic Coast Conference has held a men's lacrosse tournament since 1989. The Big Ten Conference began hosting a men's lacrosse tournament in 2015.

Year	Conference	Coach	Overall record	Conference record	Tournament record
1998	Atlantic Coast Conference	Dick Edell	14–3	3–0	2–0
2004	Atlantic Coast Conference	Dave Cottle	13–3	3–0	2–0
2005	Atlantic Coast Conference	Dave Cottle	11–6	1–2	2–0
2011	Atlantic Coast Conference	John Tillman	13–5	1–2	2–0
2016	Big Ten Conference	John Tillman	17–3	5–0	2–0
2017	Big Ten Conference	John Tillman	16–3	4–1	2–0
2022	Big Ten Conference	John Tillman	18–0	5–0	2–0

== Season results ==
The following is a list of Marylands's results by season as an NCAA Division I program:

Season	Coach	Overall	Conference	Standing	Postseason
Bud Beardmore (Atlantic Coast Conference) (1970–1980)
1971	Bud Beardmore	9–4	1–1	2nd	NCAA Division I Runner–Up
1972	Bud Beardmore	8–2	2–0	1st	NCAA Division I Final Four
1973	Bud Beardmore	10–0	3–0	1st	NCAA Division I Champion
1974	Bud Beardmore	8–2	3–0	1st	NCAA Division I Runner–Up
1975	Bud Beardmore	8–2	1–1	3rd	NCAA Division I Champion
1976	Bud Beardmore	10–1	2–0	1st	NCAA Division I Runner–Up
1977	Bud Beardmore	8–2	3–0	1st	NCAA Division I Final Four
1978	Bud Beardmore	9–2	4–0	1st	NCAA Division I Final Four
1979	Bud Beardmore	9–2	4–0	1st	NCAA Division I Runner–Up
1980	Bud Beardmore	5–5	3–1	T–1st	
Bud Beardmore:		90–26 (.776)	28–4 (.875)		
Dino Mattessich (Atlantic Coast Conference) (1981–1983)
1981	Dino Mattessich	9–5	2–2	3rd	NCAA Division I Quarterfinals
1982	Dino Mattessich	8–5	2–2	3rd	NCAA Division I Quarterfinals
1983	Dino Mattessich	9–5	2–1	2nd	NCAA Division I Final Four
Dino Mattessich:		26–15 (.634)	6–5 (.545)		
Dick Edell (Atlantic Coast Conference) (1984–2001)
1984	Dick Edell	7–4	1–2	3rd	
1985	Dick Edell	7–5	2–1	T–1st	
1986	Dick Edell	10–3	2–1	2nd	NCAA Division I Quarterfinals
1987	Dick Edell	12–1	3–0	1st	NCAA Division I Final Four
1988	Dick Edell	6–4	1–2	3rd	
1989	Dick Edell	10–4	3–0	1st	NCAA Division I Final Four
1990	Dick Edell	7–5	1–2	3rd	
1991	Dick Edell	10–5	1–2	3rd	NCAA Division I Final Four
1992	Dick Edell	9–5	2–1	2nd	NCAA Division I Quarterfinals
1993	Dick Edell	6–6	0–3	4th	NCAA Division I First Round
1994	Dick Edell	7–6	1–2	T–3rd	NCAA Division I First Round
1995	Dick Edell	12–4	2–1	2nd	NCAA Division I Runner–Up
1996	Dick Edell	10–3	2–1	T–1st	NCAA Division I Quarterfinals
1997	Dick Edell	11–5	1–2	3rd	NCAA Division I Runner–Up
1998	Dick Edell	14–3	3–0	1st	NCAA Division I Runner–Up
1999	Dick Edell	9–4	1–2	T–3rd	
2000	Dick Edell	11–6	1–2	3rd	NCAA Division I Quarterfinals
2001	Dick Edell	13–3	2–1	T–1st	NCAA Division I Quarterfinals
Dick Edell:		171–76 (.692)	29–25 (.537)		
Dave Cottle (Atlantic Coast Conference) (2002–2010)
2002	Dave Cottle	9–4	1–2	T–2nd	
2003	Dave Cottle	12–4	2–1	1st	NCAA Division I Final Four
2004	Dave Cottle	13–3	3–0	1st	NCAA Division I Quarterfinals
2005	Dave Cottle	11–6	1–2	3rd	NCAA Division I Final Four
2006	Dave Cottle	12–5	2–1	2nd	NCAA Division I Final Four
2007	Dave Cottle	10–6	1–2	3rd	NCAA Division I First Round
2008	Dave Cottle	10–6	2–1	2nd	NCAA Division I Quarterfinals
2009	Dave Cottle	10–7	2–1	1st	NCAA Division I Quarterfinals
2010	Dave Cottle	12–4	1–2	T–3rd	NCAA Division I Quarterfinals
Dave Cottle:		99–45 (.688)	15–12 (.556)		
John Tillman (Atlantic Coast Conference) (2011–2014)
2011	John Tillman	13–5	1–2	T–2nd	NCAA Division I Runner–Up
2012	John Tillman	12–6	1–2	T–3rd	NCAA Division I Runner–Up
2013	John Tillman	10–4	2–1	T–1st	NCAA Division I First Round
2014	John Tillman	13–4	4–1	1st	NCAA Division I Final Four
John Tillman (Big Ten Conference) (2015–Present)
2015	John Tillman	15–4	4–1	T–1st	NCAA Division I Runner–Up
2016	John Tillman	17–3	5–0	1st	NCAA Division I Runner–Up
2017	John Tillman	16–3	4–1	1st	NCAA Division I Champion
2018	John Tillman	14–4	4–1	1st	NCAA Division I Final Four
2019	John Tillman	12–5	3–2	T–2nd	NCAA Division I Quarterfinals
2020	John Tillman	5–1			
2021	John Tillman	15–1	10–0	1st	NCAA Division I Runner–Up
2022	John Tillman	18–0	5–0	1st	NCAA Division I Champion
2023	John Tillman	10–6	3–2	3rd	NCAA Division I First Round
2024	John Tillman	11–6	3–2	T–2nd	NCAA Division I Runner–Up
2025	John Tillman	14–4	3–2	T–2nd	NCAA Division I Runner–Up
2026	John Tillman	7–6	3–2	T–1st	
John Tillman:		202–62 (.765)	55–19 (.743)		
Total:		914–299–4 (.753)			
National champion Postseason invitational champion Conference regular season champion Conference regular season and conference tournament champion Division regular season champion Division regular season and conference tournament champion Conference tournament champion

== Alumni in the Premier Lacrosse League (28) ==
Year Drafted	Name	Position	Height	Weight	Drafted By	Draft Pick	Current Team	All Star	Accolades
2010	Brian Phipps	Goalie	5'9	180	Chesapeake Bayhawks (MLL)	4th round (23rd overall)	Whipsnakes LC	None	None
2012	Jake Bernhardt	D Midfield	6'0	190	Hamilton Nationals (MLL)	2nd round (12th overall)	Whipsnakes LC	2x All Star ('19,'21)	None
2013	Jesse Bernhardt	Defense	6'1	210	Chesapeake Bayhawks (MLL)	1st round (4th overall)	Chrome LC	None	None
2014	Michael Ehrhardt	LSM	6'5	220	Charlotte Hounds (MLL)	1st round (7th overall)	Whipsnakes LC	5x All Star ('19,'20,'21,'22,'23)	5x Merrill ('19,'20,'21,'22,'23)
2014	Mike Chanenchuk	Midfield	5'11	190	Charlotte Hounds (MLL)	2nd round (11th overall)	Whipsnakes LC	2x All Star ('19,'22)	None
2015	Jay Carlson	Attack	6'0	185	Undrafted	Undrafted	Whipsnakes LC	None	None
2016	Matt Dunn	Defense	6'3	225	Rochester Rattlers (MLL)	1st round (7th overall)	Whipsnakes LC	5x All Star ('19,'20,'21,'24,'25)	2x Pietramala ('20,'24)
2016	Kyle Bernlohr	Goalie	5'10	175	Ohio Machine (MLL)	2nd round (11th overall)	Maryland Whipsnakes	4x All Star ('19,'21,'22,'23)	1x Lyons ('22)
2016	Bryan Cole	Midfield	6'3	190	Charlotte Hounds (MLL)	2nd round (16th overall)	Whipsnakes LC	None	None
2017	Matt Rambo	Attack	5'10	210	Charlotte Hounds (MLL)	1st round (3rd overall)	Maryland Whipsnakes	4x All Star ('19,'20,'22,'23)	1x MVP ('19), 1x McEneaney ('19)
2017	Colin Heacock	Attack	6'3	210	Chesapeake Bayhawks (MLL)	2nd round (11th overall)	Maryland Whipsnakes	2x All Star ('19,'21)	None
2017	Tim Muller	Defense	6'2	215	Florida Launch (MLL)	2nd round (10th overall)	Whipsnakes LC	None	None
2017	Isaiah Davis-Allen	D Midfield	6'3	180	Chesapeake Bayhawks (MLL)	2nd round (16th overall)	Redwoods LC	None	None
2018	Connor Kelly	Midfield	6'0	195	Atlanta Blaze (MLL)	1st round (2nd overall)	Philadelphia Waterdogs	2x All Star ('22,'23)	None
2018	Bryce Young	Defense	6'2	205	Ohio Machine (MLL)	2nd round (15th overall)	Boston Cannons	1x All Star ('19)	None
2021	Nick Grill	Defense	5'8	185	Whipsnakes LC	4th round (31st overall)	Denver Outlaws	None	None
2022	Logan Wisnauskis	Attack	6'3	215	Chrome LC	1st round (1st overall)	Chrome LC	1x All Star ('22)	None
2022	Roman Puglise	D Midfield	5'11	195	Whipsnakes LC	1st round (7th overall)	Maryland Whipsnakes	None	None
2022	Bubba Fairman	D Midfield	6'1	195	Cannons LC	2nd round (11th overall)	Boston Cannons	None	None
2022	Jonathan Donville	Midfield	6'0	195	Chaos LC	2nd round (16th overall)	Denver Outlaws	None	None
2022	Keegan Khan	Attack	6'1	175	Whipsnakes LC	3rd round (20th overall)	Whipsnakes LC	None	None
2022	Jake Higgins	D Midfield	6'0	195	Waterdogs LC	3rd round (22nd overall)	Waterdogs LC	None	None
2022	Anthony DeMaio	D Midfield	5'10	165	Undrafted	Undrafted	Redwoods LC	None	None
2023	Brett Makar	Defense	6'1	210	Atlas LC	1st round (3rd overall)	New York Atlas	2x All Star ('23,'25)	None
2024	Ajax Zappitello	Defense	6'1	190	Maryland Whipsnakes	1st round (3rd overall)	Maryland Whipsnakes	1x All Star ('25)	None
2024	Luke Wierman	Faceoff	6'2	211	Denver Outlaws	3rd round (17th overall)	Denver Outlaws	None	None
2025	Logan McNaney	Goalie	5'10	185	Denver Outlaws	2nd round (7th overall)	Denver Outlaws	1x All Star ('25)	1x Lyons ('25)
2025	Jack McDonald	Midfield	6'5	210	Carolina Chaos	2nd round (16th overall)	Maryland Whipsnakes	None	None
2025	Bryce Ford	Midfield	5'8	190	Utah Archers	4th round (32nd overall)	Utah Archers	None	None
