= 1975 NCAA Division I lacrosse tournament =

1975 NCAA Division I men's lacrosse tournament
- Dates: May 17–31, 1975
- Teams: 8
- Finals site: Homewood Field, Baltimore, Maryland
- Champions: Maryland (2nd title)
- Runner-up: Navy (1st title game)
- Semifinalists: Cornell (3rd Final Four); Washington and Lee (3rd Final Four)
- Winning coach: Bud Beardmore (2nd title)
- Attendance: 10,875 finals
- Top scorer: Bert Caswell and Frank Urso, Maryland; Jeff Long, Navy, (14 goals)

The 1975 NCAA Division I lacrosse tournament was the fifth annual tournament hosted by the National Collegiate Athletic Association to determine the team champion of men's college lacrosse among its Division I programs at the end of the 1975 NCAA Division I lacrosse season.

Maryland defeated Navy in the championship game, 20–13, the Terrapins' second national title in three years.

The championship game was played at Homewood Field on the campus of Johns Hopkins University in Baltimore, Maryland, featuring a crowd of 10,875 fans.

== Overview ==
Eight NCAA Division I college men's lacrosse teams met in the postseason single-elimination tournament to decide the national championship.

Frank Urso scored five goals in the finals for Maryland. The Terps took 62 shots in both the semi-finals and the finals. In the championship game, Maryland and Navy combined for 120 shots.

The national title game represented the 50th time the Middies and Maryland had met since the sport was put on Maryland's varsity list in 1924. The Terps’ season concluded with a five-game winning streak including victories over Johns Hopkins, Hofstra, Washington & Lee and Navy. Navy had earlier in the season upset Maryland.

Bob DeSimone tied for the lead in goals for Navy with eight, scoring 4 goals in the finals. DeSimone would later transfer to Johns Hopkins helping lead the Blue Jays to the 1978 national title and the 1977 finals.

This was the first of four straight impressive tournament appearances by the Cornell attack of Mike French, Jon Levine, Bill Marino and Eamon McEneaney which resulted in titles for the Big Red in 1976 and 1977, as well as a tournament finals appearance in 1978. Cornell was 15-1 heading into the tournament and earned the top seed in this tournament. Cornell had defeated Navy handily earlier in the season, 16–7, but were upset by the 4th seeded Navy team in the tournament.

Jack Emmer's Washington and Lee team avenged a loss in the prior year's tournament with an upset of the top-ranked but second seeded Johns Hopkins in the quarterfinals.

== Bracket ==
Quarterfinals; May 17, 1975
2	Johns Hopkins (9-1)	7
7	Washington and Lee (10-6)	11
3	Maryland	19
6	Hofstra	7
4	Navy	17
5	Penn	6
1	Cornell	18
8	Rutgers	5

Semifinals; May 24, 1975
7	Washington and Lee	5
3	Maryland	15
4	Navy	15
1	Cornell	12

Championship; May 31, 1975
3	Maryland (8–2)	20
4	Navy (10–5)	13

== Box scores ==
=== Finals ===
Team	1	2	3	4	Total
Maryland (8–2)	6	3	4	7	20
Navy (10–5)	5	1	4	3	13
Maryland scoring – Frank Urso 5, Mike Hynes 3, Roger Tuck 3, Bill Gould 2, Doug Radebaugh 2, Bert Caswell, Jim Burnett, Mike Ferrell, Tony Morgan, Brooks Sleeper; Navy scoring – Bob DeSimone 4, Fred Cook 3, Jeff Long 2, Jeff Connelly, Marty Mason, Mike Gurny, Jim Shulson; Shots: Maryland 62, Navy 58; Saves: Maryland 23, Navy 18

=== Semifinals ===
Team	1	2	3	4	Total
Maryland	4	6	1	4	15
Washington and Lee	1	2	1	1	5
Maryland scoring – Doug Radebaugh 3, Bert Caswell 3, Roger Tuck 2, Gary Glatzel 2, Brooks Sleeper 2, Mike Hynes, Frank Urso, Bill Gould; Washington and Lee scoring – Chris Larson 2, Jim Englehart, Jack Dudley, Ken Miller; Shots: Maryland 62, Washington and Lee 38

Team	1	2	3	4	Total
Navy	5	2	3	5	15
Cornell	0	4	5	3	12
Navy scoring – Bob DeSimone 3, Fred Cook 3, Jeff Connelly 3, Paul Gustin 2, Jeff Long, Bill Stulb, Mike Canders, Bob Holman; Cornell scoring – Mike French 4, Jon Levine 3, Bill Marino 2, Eamon McEneaney, Dave Bray, Ted Marchell; Shots: Cornell 51, Navy 42

=== Quarterfinals ===
Team	1	2	3	4	Total
Washington and Lee	3	4	3	1	11
Johns Hopkins	1	2	2	2	7
Washington and Lee scoring – Donny Carroll 4, Chris Larson 2, Robin Major Morgan 2, Charlie Brown, Malcom Hastings, Jack Dudley; Johns Hopkins scoring – Franz Wittlesberger 5, Rich Hirsch 2; Shots: Johns Hopkins 42, Washington and Lee 37

Team	1	2	3	4	Total
Maryland	3	5	4	7	19
Hofstra	3	1	2	5	11
Maryland scoring – Frank Urso 3, Bert Caswell 3, Bob Gilmartin 3, Doug Radebaugh 2, Mike Hynes 2, Bert Olsen 2, Roger Tuck, Jim Burnett, Bob Brenton, Todd Bench; Hofstra scoring – Tom Calder 4, Phil Marino, Chuck Rogener, Billy Ruggiero, Bob Hiller, Kevin Hill, Gary White, Ted Stefaniew; Shots: Maryland 80, Hofstra 51

Team	1	2	3	4	Total
Navy	3	1	4	9	17
Pennsylvania	2	3	0	1	6
Navy scoring – Jeff Connelly 3, Jeff Long 2, Marty Mason 2, Fred Cook 2, Skip Wagner 2, Paul Gustin, Bob DeSimone, Bill Claridge, Kevin McConnell, Mike Gurny, Jim Shulson; Pennsylvania scoring – Peter Hollis 2, Bob Kilkowski, Peter Marin, Doug Sachse, Ralph McGee; Shots: Navy 75, Pennsylvania 30

Team	1	2	3	4	Total
Cornell	1	7	7	3	18
Rutgers	2	2	1	0	5
Cornell scoring – Mike French 6, Jon Levine 5, Tom Nolan 3, Eamon McEneaney, Al Haglund, Steve Dybus, Bill Marino; Rutgers scoring – Mike Rinck 3, Jim Teatom, Bob Fornaro; Shots: Cornell 40, Rutgers 29

== Outstanding players ==
The NCAA did not designate a Most Outstanding Player until the 1977 national tournament. The Tournament outstanding players are listed here as the tournament leading scorers:

- Bert Caswell, Maryland, 14 points, leading tournament scorers
- Frank Urso, Maryland, 14 points
- Jeff Long, Navy, 14 points

== See also ==
- 1975 NCAA Division II lacrosse tournament
