= Frank Urso =

American lacrosse player and coach

Personal information
- Nationality: American

Sport
- Position: Midfield
- Shoots: Right
- Coached by: Garnet Valley High School
- NLL teams: Washington Wave
- NCAA team: University of Maryland
- Pro career: 1987

Career highlights
- 1973 NCAA D-I Champion; 1975 NCAA D-I Champion; 4× First-team All-American (1973, 1974, 1975, 1976); 1975 Division I Player of the Year; 1974 Division I Midfielder of the Year; 1976 Division I Midfielder of the Year
Medal record
Representing the United States
World Lacrosse Championship
Gold medal – first place	1974 Melbourne

Frank Urso (born 1954) is a former American lacrosse player and current high school lacrosse coach, best known for his collegiate career at the University of Maryland from 1973 to 1976. During those four years, Maryland won two national championships, in 1973 and 1975, and reached the final in 1974 and 1976. Urso received the Tewaaraton Legend Award in 2016.

== College career ==
Urso led the Terrapins to the 1973 and 1975 NCAA Men's Lacrosse Championships and to a perfect 10–0 record in 1973. Urso ranks fourth all-time in Maryland men's lacrosse scoring with 208 career points and first all-time in NCAA Division I tournament scoring with 32 goals. Urso earned first-team All-American honors all four years while in college, one of only four players in NCAA history to achieve that feat.

In the 1973 national title game, Urso scored the winning goal 1:18 into overtime for a 10-9 Maryland win. In the 1975 NCAA championship game against Navy, Urso scored five goals.

Maryland reached the NCAA final again in 1976, where Urso's assist with one second left in regulation tied the game before Cornell took control in overtime to win 16 to 13. That play was controversial as the referees had to reset the game clock to six seconds. Urso then got the ball from the refs at the midfield line for the restart.

In all, the Terps during Urso's college career reached the NCAA title game four straight years, winning two titles and losing two, one of which was in overtime.

Urso was a midfield on the inaugural World Lacrosse Championship in 1974, with Team USA winning the title over Australia 20–14.

Urso was named the USILA player of the year in 1975 as well as winning the McLaughlin Award as the nation's top midfielder in 1974 and 1976. He entered the National Lacrosse Hall of Fame in 1981 and is considered one of the best college midfielders of all time. Urso was named to the NCAA's Silver Anniversary all-time lacrosse team in 1995 along with several other top collegiate players including Mike French, Eamon McEneaney, Tim Nelson, Gary Gait, Paul Gait, Brad Kotz, Dave Pietramala, Dan Mackesey, and Larry Quinn.

== High School and MILL ==
Urso was an All-American lacrosse player at Brentwood High School in New York, where he also played running back on a football squad that won 17 straight games over two years. He won the 1972 Suffolk County Ray Enners Award as the Suffolk County Coaches Lacrosse Player of the Year. He is the first player to win both the college Lt. Raymond Enners Award and the high school Lt. Ray Enners Award. His football talent enticed Ohio State, Penn State and Pittsburgh to try to recruit him for that sport.

He also played in the inaugural MILL season of 1987 for the Washington Wave leading the team to the initial championship game, and acting as an assistant coach.

== Coaching ==
In addition to his experience coaching at the MILL level, Urso has head coaching experience at the Maryland club lacrosse level.

In 2008, Urso was named head coach for the men's lacrosse team at Garnet Valley High School, a school district in suburban Philadelphia. In his first season, Urso led the Jaguars to a 14 and 9 record and a spot in the Pennsylvania high school playoffs. In 2010, Garnett Valley reached the state quarterfinals, finishing with a record of 17 and 6 achieving their best record and highest state ranking since 2007.

Urso has a record of 177 and 74 as coach at Garnet Valley.

== Statistics ==
=== University of Maryland ===
Season	GP	G	A	Pts	PPG
1973	10	28	20	48	4.80
1974	10	40	22	62	6.20
1975	10	34	19	53	5.30
1976	11	25	20	45	4.09
Totals	41	127	81	208	5.07 *

* Urso's 5.07 points-per-game during his career is not officially recognized by the NCAA, this would rank Urso top 25 on the all-time list.

== Accomplishments ==
- 1972 Lt. Raymond Enners Award
- 1973 NCAA Division I Men's Lacrosse Championship (Champions - Maryland)
- 1974 McLaughlin Award
- 1974 World Lacrosse Championship (Gold medal - United States)
- 1975 NCAA Division I Men's Lacrosse Championship (Champions - Maryland)
- 1975 Lt. Raymond Enners Award
- 1976 McLaughlin Award
- Four-time First Team All-American
- 1981 National Lacrosse Hall of Fame
- 1992 Suffolk Sports Hall of Fame on Long Island in the Lacrosse Category.
- 2016 Tewaaraton Legend Award

== See also ==
- Maryland Terrapins lacrosse
- Lacrosse in Pennsylvania

Preceded by Rick Kowalchuk	Lt. Raymond Enners Award; 1975	Succeeded by Mike French
Preceded by Douglas M. Schreiber	McLaughlin Award; 1974 & 1976	Succeeded by Douglas Radebaugh & Mike Page
