= 1971 NCAA lacrosse tournament =

1971 NCAA Division I men's lacrosse tournament
- Dates: May 22–June 5, 1971
- Teams: 8
- Finals site: Hofstra Stadium, (New York (state)) Hempstead, New York
- Champions: Cornell (1st title)
- Runner-up: Maryland (1st title game)
- Semifinalists: Army (1st Final Four); Navy (1st Final Four)
- Winning coach: Richie Moran (1st title)
- MOP: Tom Cafaro, Army, Army
- Attendance: 5,458 finals
- Top scorer: Tom Cafaro, Army (18 goals)

The 1971 NCAA lacrosse tournament was the first annual tournament hosted by the National Collegiate Athletic Association to determine the team champion of college lacrosse among its members in the United States.

Prior to this the United States Intercollegiate Lacrosse Association (USILA) had voted for the national champion and, subsequently, awarded the Wingate Memorial Trophy for the college lacrosse title based on regular season records.

In the inaugural final, top-seeded Cornell defeated Maryland, 12–6. The championship game was played at Hofstra Stadium at Hofstra University in Hempstead, New York with 5,458 fans in attendance.

This was Cornell's first lacrosse title since winning the USILA championship in 1907. Cornell was 1–4–1 against Maryland up to this point, in a series that began with Cornell's 2–1 win in 1921. The teams played a 2–2 tie in 1922, and Maryland won by 11–1 in 1929, 14–2 in 1951, 17–10 in 1963 and 13–6 in 1965.

For this tournament as well as the 1972 tournament, the Wingate Memorial Trophy was presented to the winner.

== Qualification ==
Eight NCAA Division I college men's lacrosse teams met after having played their way through a regular season.

College lacrosse at that time was broken into four divisions, so the NCAA tournament games for that year were based on geographical fit rather than seeding. The Tournament teams were selected from 114 schools which sponsored lacrosse at that time. Each division sent one team, two other teams were picked from the northern, southern and western divisions, and then two teams were chosen at large, chosen by a selection committee of five coaches and athletic directors.

== Overview ==
The Cornell Big Red, who posted a 13–1 record during the season, were led by coach Richard M. Moran and star players Bob Rule, John Burnap, Bob Shaw, and Alan Rimmer, defeated the 9-3 Maryland Terrapins 12 to 6 in the finals. Cornell had won 13 straight games leading up to the title game, losing only their opener by one goal to Virginia. Cornell won despite their first team All American goaltender Bob Rule being out with an injury, he was injured in the quarterfinal game against Brown. Backup goaltender Bob Buhmann, who also was the backup ice hockey goaltender to Ken Dryden, started in place of Rule and was credited with 25 saves as the Big Red shut down the Maryland attack. Buhmann also ended up as an honorable mention All American that season, and all told made 52 saves in this tournament.

Canadian-born Al Rimmer, the first Canadian born NCAA lacrosse recruit, scored six goals in the finals to lead Cornell. Rimmer, from Toronto, had led Cornell with 43 goals and 31 assists for 74 points for the season. He ended his career as the all-time Cornell record-holder in career points with 80 goals and 82 assists for 162 points.

In 1970 in just his second year, Coach Moran's team was the only squad in the nation to go undefeated with a record of 11–0, but controversy ensued when the USILA named Johns Hopkins, Navy and Virginia as the national champions, while Cornell was voted fifth in the country. The next season, after losing in the season opener to Virginia, 10–9, Cornell rattled off 13-straight victories. In the semi-finals, Cornell edged Army, 17–16, with Cornell grabbing a 7–4 lead after one period. Army, led by Tom Cafaro who had seven goals and three assists in the game, battled back and by the third period it became a question of who would get the last goal. The lead changed hands twice and the score was tied four times in the final period, before Bob Shaw scored at 12:33 giving Cornell the victory. Frank Davis' four goals against Army in the semi-finals ensured Cornell's place in the national championship. Cornell had not beaten Army in their previous 15 games.

Coach Richie Moran was voted the Division I Coach of the Year, while John Burnap won the Schmeisser Award as the nation's outstanding defenseman and Bob Rule won the Ens. C.M. Kelly, Jr. Award as the nation's top goaltender, despite the fact that a season-ending knee injury kept Rule from playing in the NCAA tournament.

In the finals, Al Rimmer fired in six of Cornell's 12 goals, with Cornell never trailing in the game. Rimmer scored first at 59 seconds and though Maryland was able to tie the score at 2-2, the Terps posed no real threat after the first period. The goal that put Cornell ahead for good was produced by their third midfield. With 7:47 to go in the first period, Bob Wagner, a senior from Newton, Pa., scored off an assist by Craig Bollinger, a junior from Rochester, N.Y. Rimmer then took command and racked up three straight goals. Frank Davis, a junior from Sanborn, N.Y. and Bucky Gunts, a junior from Baltimore, Md. finished up Cornell's string of six straight goals.

== Bracket ==
Quarterfinals; May 22
1	Cornell (10-1)	10
8	Brown (11-2)	8
4	Army (10-1)	19
5	Hofstra (12-3)	3
3	Maryland (7-3)	10
6	Air Force (14-1)	1
2	Navy (9-3)	9
7	Virginia (10-1)	6

Semi-Finals; May 29
1	Cornell	17
4	Army	16
3	Maryland	10
2	Navy	7

Final; June 5
1	Cornell (13–1)	12
3	Maryland (9–4)	6

== Box scores ==
=== Final ===
==== #1 Cornell vs. #3 Maryland ====
- 6/05/1971 at Hofstra Stadium, Hempstead, New York

Team	1	2	3	4	Total
Cornell (13–1)	4	4	2	2	12
Maryland (9–5)	2	1	1	2	6
Cornell scoring: Goals – Alan Rimmer 6, Bucky Gunts 2, Mickey Fenzel, Rob Wagner, Bob Shaw, Frank Davis Assists – Craig Bollinger 2, Glenn Mueller 2, Bob Shaw, Frank Davis, John Burnap; Maryland scoring: Goals – Tom Cleaver 2, Steve Demczuk, Eric Nachlas, Ed Hubbard, Dave Dempsey Assists – John Kaestner, Phil Marino; Shots: Maryland 46, Cornell 42; Saves: Cornell Bob Buhmann 25, Maryland Bill Reilly 10; Attendance: 5,458

=== Semifinals ===
==== #1 Cornell vs. #4 Army ====
Team	1	2	3	4	Total
Cornell	7	4	2	4	17
Army	4	6	2	4	16
Cornell scoring – Frank Davis 4, Alan Rimmer 3, Bob Shaw 3, Pat Gallagher 3, Mickey Fenzel 2, Glenn Mueller, Bucky Gunts; Army scoring – Tom Cafaro 7, Ron Liss 4, Rich Enners 2, Bucky Walker 2, Russ Bolling; Shots: Cornell 49, Army 39; Saves: Cornell Bob Buhmann 15, Army Greg Doepke 9; Location: West Point, New York (Michie Stadium) - 5/29/1971; Attendance: 3,750

==== #2 Navy vs. #3 Maryland ====
Team	1	2	3	4	Total
Maryland	3	2	2	3	10
Navy	1	0	3	3	7
Maryland scoring – Tom Kelly 2, John Kaestner 2, Eric Nachlas 2, Dennis Dorsey, Tom Cleaver, Dan Furman, Phil Marino; Navy scoring – Steven Nastro 3, Tim Supko 2, Pete Kordis, Robert Pell; Shots: Maryland 36, Navy 32; Saves: Maryland Bill Reilly 11, Navy Steve Soroka 11 - McFarland 1; Location: College Park, Maryland (Byrd Stadium) - 5/29/1971; Attendance: 8,300

=== Quarterfinals ===
==== #1 Cornell vs. #8 Brown ====
Team	1	2	3	4	Total
Cornell	3	2	4	1	10
Brown	3	1	1	3	8
Cornell scoring – Glenn Mueller 3, Pat Gallagher 2, Bob Shaw 2, Frank Davis, Mickey Fenzel, Bruce Teague; Brown scoring – Bob Scalise 2, Rupert Scofield 2, Dean Rollins 2, Dave Owens, Joe Daugherty; Shots: Cornell 46, Brown 45; Saves: Cornell Bob Buhmann 12 - Bob Rule 1, Brown Spiro 11; Location: Ithaca, NY (Schoellkopf Field) - 5/22/1971; Attendance:

==== #4 Army vs. #5 Hofstra ====
Team	1	2	3	4	Total
Army	7	3	6	3	19
Hofstra	0	0	1	2	3
Army scoring – Tom Cafaro 4, David Coughlin 4, Rich Enners 3, Frank Eich 2, Bob Armbruster 2, Russ Bolling, Steve Wood, Ron Liss, Mick Sela; Hofstra scoring – Bob DeMarco, Bill Artus, Randolph Caruso; Shots: Army 30, Hofstra 28; Saves: Army Greg Doepke 9 - Peitz 3, Hofstra Zassuto 8 - Trencacoste 2; Location: West Point, New York (Michie Stadium) - 5/22/1971; Attendance:

==== #2 Navy vs. #7 Virginia ====
Team	1	2	3	4	Total
Navy	3	3	2	1	9
Virginia	3	0	1	2	6
Navy scoring – Bill Kordis 5, Steven Nastro 2, Patrick Lee, Robert Pell; Virginia scoring – Pete Eldredge 3, Bob Proutt, Jay Connor, Rick Beach; Shots: Virginia 44, Navy 34; Saves: Navy Steve Soroka 20, Virginia Al Hirsh 14; Location: Charlottesville, Virginia (Scott Stadium) - 5/22/1971; Attendance: 6,800

==== #3 Maryland vs. #6 Air Force ====
Team	1	2	3	4	Total
Maryland	2	2	1	5	10
Air Force	1	0	0	0	1
Maryland scoring – John Kaestner 2, Eric Nachlas 2, Len Spicer, Dave Dempsey, Tom Cleaver, Dennis Dorsey, Dan Furman, Gary Besosa; Air Force scoring – Thomas Dour; Shots: Maryland 41, Air Force 16; Saves: Maryland Bill Reilly 7 - Kramer 0, Air Force Houle 19 - McCoy 1; Location: College Park, Maryland (Byrd Stadium) - 5/22/1971; Attendance: 2,200

== Outstanding player ==
Tom Cafaro, Army
18 points, Tournament Leading Scorer

- The NCAA did not designate a Most Outstanding Player until the 1977 national tournament.
  The Tournament outstanding player listed here is the tournament leading scorer.

== See also ==
- Richard M. Moran
- Wingate Memorial Trophy
