= 1973 NCAA lacrosse tournament =

1973 NCAA Division I men's lacrosse tournament
- Dates: May 19–June 2, 1973
- Teams: 8
- Finals site: Franklin Field, Philadelphia, Pennsylvania
- Champions: Maryland (1st title)
- Runner-up: Johns Hopkins (2nd title game)
- Semifinalists: Virginia (2nd Final Four); Washington and Lee (1st Final Four)
- Winning coach: Bud Beardmore (1st title)
- Attendance: 7,117 finals
- Top scorer: Jack Thomas, Johns Hopkins (14 goals)

The 1973 NCAA lacrosse tournament was the third annual tournament hosted by the National Collegiate Athletic Association to determine the team champion of college lacrosse among its members in the United States.

Undefeated Maryland, led by coach Bud Beardmore and Hall of Fame midfielder Frank Urso, defeated Johns Hopkins in the championship game, 10–9 after two overtimes, with Urso scoring the winning goal one minute and 18 seconds into the second overtime.

The final was played at Franklin Field in Philadelphia, Pennsylvania in front of a crowd of 5,965 fans.

== Overview ==
The top eight teams in the season-ending lacrosse coaches poll were selected to play in the 1973 tournament.

Johns Hopkins defeated Virginia 12-9 and Maryland beat Washington and Lee 18–5 to reach the national championship game. The win represented Maryland's eighth overall men's lacrosse National Title, but first under the newly instituted NCAA lacrosse tournament format. Bud Beardmore was named USILA Coach of the Year.

Prior to the Hopkins overtime win, the Terrapins closest game was a five-goal victory against UMBC. Maryland had beaten Hopkins 17 to 4 in the regular season about a month prior to the finals. In the Terps' ten games, they averaged 17 goals per game and held opponents to 6 goals per game.

Johns Hopkins used a possession game to counter the Terrapins' top rated offense, which resulted in over fifteen minutes of limited-shooting possessions by the Blue Jays in the first half. Maryland countered with patient and mistake-free defensive play to offset the stall tactic though Frank Urso was able to get free to score three goals. Hopkins held the ball for the first 10:45 of the game with the first shot of the game not being taken until over eight minutes had passed. Hopkins' tactics worked initially as the Blue Jays took a 5–2 lead at halftime.

Maryland overcame Johns Hopkins' possession game in the second half, outscoring the Jays 8–4 in the second half. However, the Jays still had a 9-7 lead with just under 5 minutes to play in the game. The winning goal came in the second overtime for the 10–9 victory. Urso scored the goal taking a solo run and converting a 15-yard bounce shot. Since this was not a sudden-death overtime period, Maryland held for the final three minutes to win the contest.

The Terps had encountered little resistance on their way to the title as they downed Brown 16-4 and Washington and Lee 18–7 in the first two rounds. Johns Hopkins had disposed of Army 11-5 and the defending national champion Virginia 12–9.

Washington and Lee goalie Skeet Chadwick had 55 saves in two tournament games. Washington and Lee, a recent addition to the top tier of teams, beat Navy in a three overtime marathon 13–12 in the first round. The two teams each scored two goals in the non-sudden death first overtime period with Washington and Lee scoring the winning goal 16 seconds into the 3rd sudden-death overtime period. Washington and Lee was undefeated coming into the semifinals, with regular season wins over North Carolina, Towson and Princeton.

Jack Thomas of Johns Hopkins had 11 tournament assists and was the tournament leading scorer.

Maryland was the first Undefeated Division I national champion, and also the last, accomplishing this as well in 2022.

== Bracket ==
Quarterfinals; May 19
1	Maryland (7-0)	16
8	Brown (10-1)	4
4	Washington and Lee (13-0)	13^{(iii)}
6	Navy (8-4)	12
3	Hofstra (12-1)	5
5	Virginia	12
2	Johns Hopkins (9-1)	11
7	Army	5

Semifinals; May 26
1	Maryland	18
4	Washington and Lee (13–1)	7
5	Virginia	9
2	Johns Hopkins	12

Championship; June 2
1	Maryland (10–0)	10^{(ii)}
2	Johns Hopkins (11–2)	9

- ^{(ii)} two overtimes
- ^{(iii)} three overtimes

== Box scores ==
=== Final ===
- 6/02/1973 at Franklin Field, Philadelphia, Pennsylvania

Team	1	2	3	4	OT1	OT2	Total
Maryland (10–0)	0	2	4	3	0	1	10
Johns Hopkins (11–2)	2	3	2	2	0	0	9
Maryland scoring – Frank Urso 3, Gary Besosa 2, Pat O’Meally 2, Dino Mattessich, Brooks Sleeper, Doug Schreiber; Johns Hopkins scoring – Rick Kowalchuk 3, Mike Perez 2, Ken Winegrad 2, Jack Thomas, Franz Wittelsberger; Shots: Maryland 50, Johns Hopkins 35; Saves: Maryland Bill O'Donnell 10 - Glatzell 1, Johns Hopkins Les Mathews 15; Attendance: 7,117

=== Semifinals ===
Team	1	2	3	4	Total
Maryland	5	5	2	6	18
Washington and Lee (14–1)	3	3	1	0	7
Maryland scoring – Ed Mullen 3, Pat O’Meally 3, Frank Urso 3, Dino Mattessich 2, Doug Radebaugh 2, Doug Schreiber 2, Dave Hallock, Larry Hubbard, Roger Tuck; Washington and Lee scoring – Sam Englehart 2, Skip Lichtfuss 2, Ted Bauer, Bryan Chasney, Dave Warfield; Shots: Maryland 82, Washington and Lee 27; Saves: Maryland Bill O'Donnell 9 - Kramer 1, Washington and Lee Skeet Chadwick 27 - Hoatson 0; Location: College Park, Maryland (Byrd Stadium) - 5/26/1973; Attendance: 1,902

Team	1	2	3	4	Total
Johns Hopkins	2	3	3	4	12
Virginia	2	1	4	2	9
Johns Hopkins scoring – Rick Kowalchuk 4, Franz Wittelsberger 3, Jack Thomas, Dale Kohler, Don Krohn, Ken Winegrad, Bill Nolan; Virginia scoring – Barry Robertson 2, Doug Cooper 2, Rich Werner 2, Tom Duquette, Jim Ulman, Owen Daly; Shots: Virginia 59, Johns Hopkins 49; Saves: Johns Hopkins Les Mathews 14, Virginia Rodney Rullman 23; Location: Baltimore, Maryland (Homewood Field) - 5/26/1973; Attendance:

=== Quarterfinals ===
Team	1	2	3	4	Total
Maryland	2	5	7	2	16
Brown	1	1	1	1	4
Maryland scoring – Bob Mitchell 4, Frank Urso 3, Doug Schreiber 3, Gary Besosa, Harmon Levine, Ed Mullen, Pat O’Meally, Doug Radebaugh, Brooks Sleeper; Brown scoring – Scott Cummings 2, Bob Rubeor, Jeff Wagner; Shots: Maryland 62, Brown 27; Saves: Maryland Bill O'Donnell 6 - Kramer 4, Brown Dan Campbell 10 - Jim Hahn 7; Location: College Park, Maryland (Byrd Stadium) - 5/19/1973; Attendance: 1,168

Team	1	2	3	4	OT1	OT2	OT3	Total
Washington and Lee	2	5	1	2	2	0	1	13
Navy	3	1	2	4	2	0	0	12
Washington and Lee scoring – Dave Warfield 4, Sam Englehart 4, Skip Lichtfuss 2, Don Carroll 2, Chip Tompkins; Navy scoring – Bill Kordis 4, Dave Bayly 3, Joe Avviduti 2, Tom Venier, Marty Mason, Kim McCauley; Shots: Navy 64, Washington and Lee 47; Saves: Washington and Lee Skeet Chadwick 28, Navy Finnegan 11; Location: Lexington, Virginia (Wilson Field) - 5/19/1973; Attendance:

Team	1	2	3	4	Total
Virginia	4	5	1	2	12
Hofstra	0	1	1	3	5
Virginia scoring – Barry Robertson 5, Rich Werner 2, Owen Daly, Doug Cooper, Jeff Clute, Jim Ulman, Greg Montgomery; Hofstra scoring – Kevin Hill, Bob Auguste, Jim Merryman, Bob Miller, Bill Reid; Shots: Virginia 50, Hofstra 35; Saves: Virginia Rodney Rullman 14 - Howe 4, Hofstra Zaffuto 14; Location: Hempstead, New York (Hofstra Stadium) - 5/19/1973; Attendance: 3,500

Team	1	2	3	4	Total
Johns Hopkins	5	2	2	2	11
Army	2	1	1	1	5
Johns Hopkins scoring – Don Krohn 4, Mike Perez 2, Bill Nolan 2, Jack Thomas, Franz Wittelsberger, Rick Kowalchuk; Army scoring – Joe Hennessy 3, George Reynolds, Rick Goodhand; Shots: Johns Hopkins 44, Army 41; Saves: Johns Hopkins Les Mathews 11 - Godack 3, Army Chris Torgerson 12 - Schaeffer 2 - Heilman 1; Location: Baltimore, Maryland (Homewood Field) - 5/19/1973; Attendance: 1,200

== Outstanding players ==
The NCAA did not designate a Most Outstanding Player until the 1977 national tournament.

== See also ==
Undefeated Division I National Champions
