= NCAA men's lacrosse championship =

American college sports tournament

- Current season, competition or edition: 2026
- Sport: Men's Lacrosse
- Founded: 1971
- Country: United States
- Most recent champions: Division I—Princeton; Division II—Tampa; Division III—Tufts
- Broadcaster: ESPN
- Website: NCAA.com

NCAA Men's Lacrosse Championship refers to one of three championships in men's field lacrosse that is contested by the NCAA since 1971 to determine the top team in the NCAA Division I, Division II, and Division III.

- NCAA Division I Men's Lacrosse Championship
- NCAA Division II Men's Lacrosse Championship
- NCAA Division III Men's Lacrosse Championship

This tournament has determined the national champion since the inaugural 1971 NCAA Division I Men's Lacrosse Championship. Prior to this, from 1936 through 1970, the executive board of the United States Intercollegiate Lacrosse Association (USILA) selected the annual winners of the Wingate Memorial Trophy as national champions based on season records.

The NCAA Men's Lacrosse Championship, with the semi-finals and finals played in National Football League stadiums, is among the most attended NCAA Championships.

== See also ==
- United States Intercollegiate Lacrosse Association
- Wingate Memorial Trophy
- NCAA Women's Lacrosse Championship
- USILA Senior All Star Game
