= Severn School =

School in Severna Park, Maryland, US

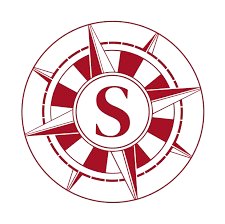

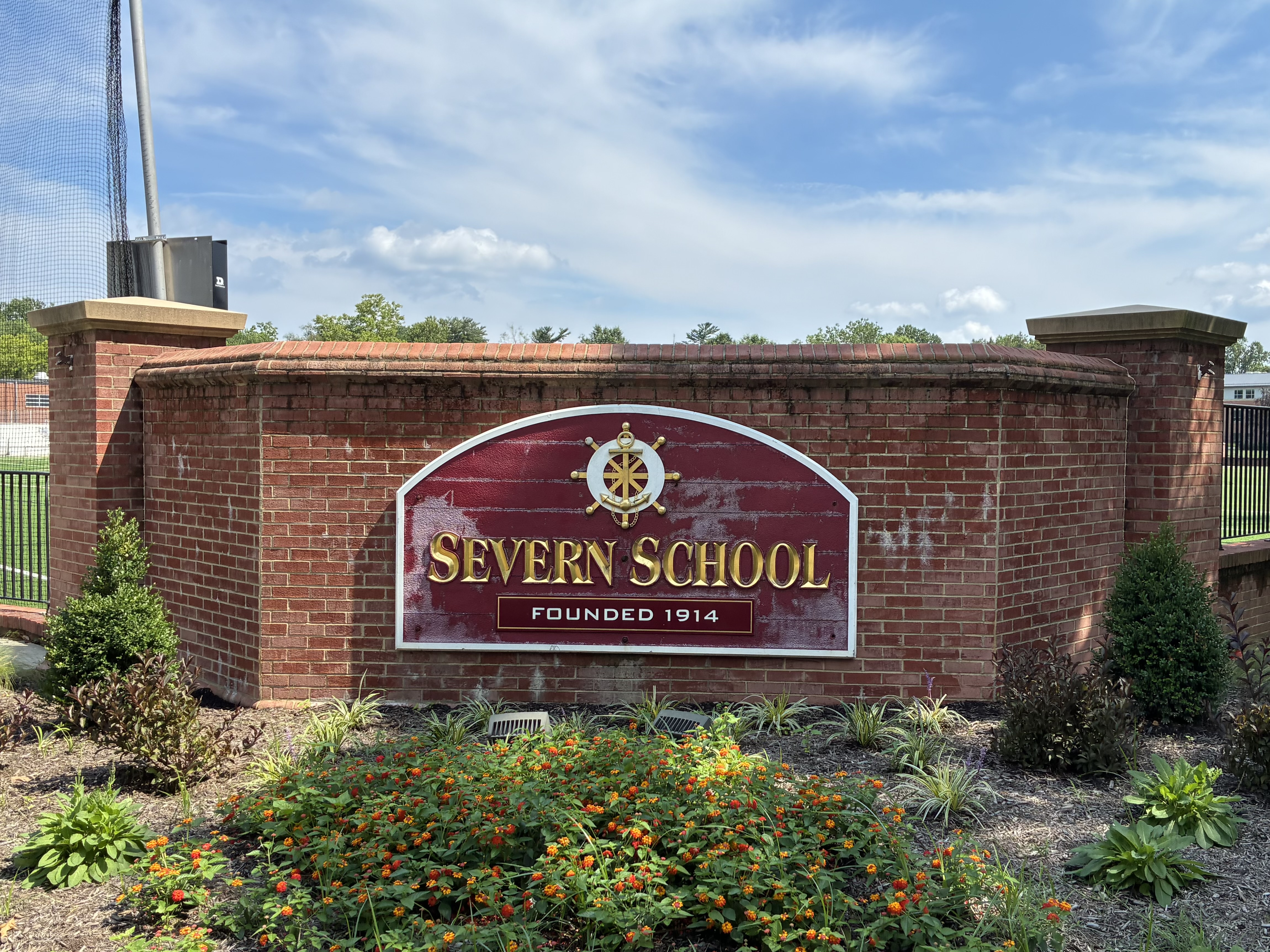
- 201 Water Street; Severna Park, Maryland; United States

Information
- Established: 1914
- Founder: Roland M. Teel
- Head of school: Doug Lagarde
- Faculty: 125
- Enrollment: 910
- Average class size: 15
- Student to teacher ratio: 9:1
- Campus type: Suburban
- Colors: Maroon and White
- Athletics: 47 athletic teams
- Mascot: The Admiral
- Team name: Admirals
- Rival: St. Mary's High School (Annapolis, Maryland)
- Accreditation: Association of Independent Maryland Schools (AIMS); approved by the Maryland State Board of Education
- Website: www.severnschool.com

Severn School is a private college preparatory school in Severna Park, Maryland, United States. It was founded in 1914 by Roland M. Teel as a preparatory school for the United States Naval Academy. In 2013, the school merged with nearby Chesapeake Academy. Severn serves students in preschool through grade 12.

== Athletics ==
The Severn Admirals compete in thirteen varsity sports: sailing, lacrosse, cross country running, football, wrestling, soccer, basketball, swimming, baseball, golf, tennis and field hockey, as well as track and field in the Maryland Interscholastic Athletic Association. Severn has 35 varsity, junior varsity and middle school teams.

== Campus ==
On Severn's 19-acre upper school and middle school campus, there are several academic buildings, including Teel Academic Center and Creeden Hall connected by elevated glass bridges on the upper floors. Teel Academic Center underwent a complete renovation in 2015 where the original Teel Academic Center, constructed in 1969 to house boarding students, was torn down and replaced with the new $17 million building. The new building houses Graw Innovation Center, a computer lab, the Zimmerman Library, and the Hoehn-Saric Family Center for Academic Excellence, as well as middle and upper school classrooms. Creeden Hall, constructed in 2002 as the Upper School Academic Center, contains science labs and prep rooms, a greenhouse, "Roche" Lecture Hall, classrooms, two computer labs, and several spaces for students such as Creeden Commons. Also on this campus is McCleary Student Center which houses Price Auditorium, Bauer Dining Hall, Powell Conference Room, and several arts classrooms for both the middle and upper school. In 2012, construction was completed on the Stine Outdoor Education Center, a 2-acre space behind the two academic buildings featuring a tiered outdoor classroom, trails, a counsel ring, challenge course with low ropes to promote team building, and an artist's reflection area.

Severn School has also finished the process of constructing the Edward St. John Athletic Center. The facility, opened April 2008, cost about $10 million. Alongside the completion of this building was the construction of two turf fields, one for field hockey and lacrosse, and one for football and soccer, to accompany two more grass athletic fields.

The Chesapeake Campus in Arnold, acquired in 2013, houses Severn School's Lower School, serving students from preschool through grade 5. The campus includes Flinchum Gymnasium, the Barbara Cromwell Library, and The Wilson Family Performance & Community Center. Most of the campus was demolished in 2025 as part of a redevelopment project, with Flinchum Gymnasium and portions of the Sivvy Theatre retained. The campus was subsequently renovated and Lower School students returned to the Chesapeake Campus.

Price Auditorium on the Teel Campus is also planned for renovation and expansion, including increased seating capacity and upgraded facilities.

== Notable alumni ==
- Distinguished alumni include three recipients of the Medal of Honor: RADM (then CDR) Herbert E. Schonland ('20), CAPT (then CDR) George L. Street III ('33) and RADM (then LCDR) Bruce McCandless ('28);
- Slade Cutter ('30), four-time Navy Cross recipient and College Football Hall of Fame member
- Tom Peters ('60), business management author
- Joseph Caleb Deschanel ('62), cinematographer
- Joseph D. Stewart ('60), former United States Merchant Marine Academy superintendent
- Henry W. Buse Jr. ('30), Lieutenant general in the Marine Corps, served as Chief of Staff, Headquarters Marine Corps
- Steve Bisciotti, Current Baltimore Ravens owner, attended Severn for two years in the 1970s.
- John P. Condon ('30), Major general in the Marine Corps and Naval Aviator
- Robert Duvall, Actor and director
- Paul Brown, NFL coach was head football coach at Severn from 1930 to 1931
- Buzz Aldrin ('47), Apollo 11 astronaut, attended Severn in preparation for the entrance exams for the United States Military Academy.
- Mary Ann Davidson ('76), Chief Security Officer at Oracle Corporation
- Mike Long ('90), former Magic: The Gathering Pro Tour champion
- Evan Washburn ('03), CBS Sports sideline reporter
