= Wingate Memorial Trophy =

Award

The Wingate Memorial Trophy was the award given to the United States Intercollegiate Lacrosse Association (USILA) national champion in men's college lacrosse from 1936 to 1970, and the NCAA Men's Champion in 1971–1972.

The first intercollegiate lacrosse tournament was held in 1881, with Harvard beating Princeton 3–0 in the championship game. From this point through 1970, USILA and the collegiate lacrosse associations from which it evolved - the ILA (1882–1905), IULL (1894–1905), USILL (1906–1925) and USILA (1926–1970) - chose the annual champions based on season records. In 1936, the family of W. Wilson Wingate, a longtime Baltimore sportswriter who had played the sport in college and often covered it, donated a memorial trophy in his name to be presented to the USILA champion. Wingate is credited with nicknaming lacrosse "the fastest game on two feet."

The NCAA held its first NCAA Men's Lacrosse Championship in 1971. The Wingate Memorial Trophy was presented to the first two NCAA champions, and retired following the 1972 season. Currently, the NCAA tournament annually determines the top lacrosse teams in Division I, Division II, and Division III.

== Wingate Memorial Trophy winners ==
Year	Champion
1936	Maryland
1937	Maryland, Princeton
1938	Navy
1939	Maryland
1940	Maryland
1941	Johns Hopkins
1942	Princeton
1943	Navy
1944	Army
1945	Army, Navy
1946	Navy
1947	Johns Hopkins
1948	Johns Hopkins
1949	Johns Hopkins, Navy
1950	Johns Hopkins
1951	Army, Princeton
1952	RPI, Virginia
1953	Princeton
1954	Navy
1955	Maryland
1956	Maryland
1957	Johns Hopkins
1958	Army
1959	Army, Maryland, Johns Hopkins^{:209}
1960	Navy
1961	Army, Navy
1962	Navy
1963	Navy
1964	Navy
1965	Navy
1966	Navy
1967	Maryland, Navy, Johns Hopkins
1968	Johns Hopkins
1969	Army, Johns Hopkins
1970	Johns Hopkins, Navy, Virginia
1971	Cornell
1972	Virginia

== Team championship records ==
Team	Championships	Winning years
Navy	15	1938, 1943, 1945, 1946, 1949, 1954, 1960, 1961, 1962, 1963, 1964, 1965, 1966, 1967, 1970
Johns Hopkins	11	1941, 1947, 1948, 1949, 1950, 1957, 1959, 1967, 1968, 1969, 1970
Maryland	8	1936, 1937, 1939, 1940, 1955, 1956, 1959, 1967
Army	7	1944, 1945, 1951, 1958, 1959, 1961, 1969
Princeton	4	1937, 1942, 1951, 1953
Virginia	3	1952, 1970, 1972
Cornell	1	1971
RPI	1	1952

=== Championships by state ===
State	Titles	University
Maryland	34	Navy (15), Johns Hopkins (11), Maryland (8)
(New York (state)) New York	9	Army (7), Cornell (1), RPI (1)
New Jersey	4	Princeton (4)
Virginia	3	Virginia (3)

== See also ==
- United States Intercollegiate Lacrosse Association
- NCAA Men's Lacrosse Championship
