= USILA Senior All Star Game =

The USILA Senior All Star Game is an annual postseason college lacrosse game featuring the best players from the graduating class. It is hosted by the United States Intercollegiate Lacrosse Association (USILA), one of the college sport's main governing bodies. The inaugural event occurred in 1940 at Municipal Stadium in Baltimore, Maryland. Since then, it has been played yearly with the exception of 1944 and 1945 due to World War II.

The game pits a North squad against a South squad, each composed of the best players from schools located in those respective regions of the United States. Some coaches and organizers believed the concept could reduce the perception of lacrosse as an "elite Eastern sport". The North squad draws its players and coaches from the schools of the Northeastern United States, generally New England, New York, New Jersey, and Pennsylvania. The South squad draws its players and coaches from schools located elsewhere in the nation, generally Maryland, Delaware, the District of Columbia, Virginia, North Carolina, and the South, Midwest, and West regions.

In 1991, the format was changed to two games, one for Division I and Division II players, and a second for Division III players. The 2006 edition was changed to one game for all divisions, before the event reverted to the two-game format the following year.
