= United States Intercollegiate Lacrosse Association =

The United States Intercollegiate Lacrosse Association (USILA) is an association of member institutions and organizations with college lacrosse programs at all levels of competition, including the three NCAA divisions and non-NCAA schools, at both the varsity and club levels for men and women. The association traces its history through predecessor organizations back to 1882, although it received its present name and became a governing body with unlimited membership in 1926. The association is based in Louisville, Kentucky.

== History ==
The first intercollegiate game in the United States was played on November 22, 1877 between New York University and Manhattan College. Lacrosse had been introduced in upstate New York in the 1860s. Lacrosse was further introduced to the Baltimore area in the 1890s. An organizing body for the sport, the U. S. National Lacrosse Association, was founded in 1879. The first intercollegiate lacrosse tournament was held in 1881, with Harvard beating Princeton, 3–0, in the championship game. New York University and Columbia University also participated.

In 1882 three colleges formed a league called the Intercollegiate Lacrosse Association (ILA), which several others also joined. In most years from this point through 1931, collegiate lacrosse associations selected annual champions based on season records. In 1899, the Inter-University Lacrosse League (IULL) began play using slightly different rules. The two leagues merged in December, 1905, to form the 8-team United States Intercollegiate Lacrosse League with Columbia, Cornell, Harvard, Johns Hopkins, Lehigh, Penn, Stevens Tech and Swarthmore. The USILL was a closed-membership league, which excluded several lacrosse powers, such as the U.S. Naval Academy. The national championship was officially bestowed only upon teams that were included in the membership of these organizations.

The 1907 Constitution, By-Laws and Playing Rules of the United States Inter-Collegiate Lacrosse League

In 1906, the USILL established Northern and Southern Divisions, and its by-laws encouraged the annual division winners to play a post-season championship game. Only two such games were played, in 1912 and 1921. As Navy was not a member of the USILL, its teams were not eligible for the championship, even though Navy had the best collegiate record in many of those years. Navy was undefeated from 1917 through 1923, a stretch of 40 games with one tie.

The USILL was replaced by the United States Intercollegiate Lacrosse Association in March, 1926, as an open-membership governing body. In addition to the 12 former USILL teams, Rutgers, Navy, Union College, NYU, Colgate and St. Stephen's (now Bard College) became new USILA members. The USILA bestowed gold medals upon the teams that it selected as national champions through the 1931 season. No official champions were named from 1932 through 1935. In 1936, an award was established in the memory of a Baltimore sportswriter to recognize annually the most outstanding teams. From 1936 through 1972, the USILA executive board awarded the Wingate Memorial Trophy to the national champions.

From 1953–1959, lacrosse divisions were officially named after legendary lacrosse-men. These were the Cy Miller, Laurie D. Cox, and Roy Taylor Divisions. They were more commonly referred to as Division I, or A; Division II, or B; and Division III, or C. All college teams were placed in one of the three divisions, dependent upon their records, schedules, and success for the preceding five years, and a point system was created. Any team of the three divisions was eligible to win the national championship, but this was virtually impossible for non-Division I teams. A Division II team, playing several Division I teams, might have been able to achieve it. A team's record was required to include six games against teams in its own division. Teams were realigned every three years, again reflecting their records. All schools were eligible for the national rankings. The team that achieved the highest point total each year, however, was not guaranteed a solo national championship. The system served as guidance to the USILA executive board, who chose co-champions on frequent occasions. This point system prevailed with modifications until the NCAA in the early 1970s established the playoff system for determining champions. After 1959, Divisions II and III were realigned by geographical region instead of by team records.

At its 1969 annual meeting in Baltimore, the USILA voted for its first playoff tournament to determine a national champion. In 1971, the NCAA began sponsoring men's lacrosse and began holding an annual championship tournament for Division I schools. The USILA conducted a small college tournament for non-Division I schools in 1972 and 1973 (won by Hobart and Cortland State). In 1974, the NCAA took over the sponsorship of this tournament through the 1979 season, with separate tournaments being conducted in both 1980 and 1981 for Divisions II and III teams. The Division II tournament then was discontinued until returning in 1993.

== Awards ==
The USILA has inducted members into the United States Lacrosse Museum and National Hall of Fame annually since 1957. In addition, the USILA presents annually a number of awards to top collegiate athletes in NCAA Division I, Division II, and Division III.

=== Division I awards ===
Award	Presented for
Lt. Raymond Enners Award	National Player of the Year
F. Morris Touchstone Award	Coach of the Year
Jack Turnbull Award	Attackman of the Year
Lt. Donald McLaughlin Jr Award	Midfielder of the Year
William C. Schmeisser Award	Defenseman of the Year
Ensign C. Markland Kelly, Jr. Award	Goaltender of the Year

=== Other Awards ===
- Howdy Meyers Man of the Year Award
- Frenchy Julien Service Award
- Doyle Smith Sports Information/Media Award
- Coach of the Year (Division II)
- Coach of the Year (Division III)

== Champions ==
=== ILA champions 1881–1898 ===
U.S. National Lacrosse Association tournament

Year	Champion
1881	Harvard

Intercollegiate Lacrosse Association

Year	Champion	Year	Champion	Year	Champion
1882	Harvard	1888	Princeton	1894	Stevens Tech
1883	Harvard, Princeton, Yale	1889	Princeton	1895	Lehigh
1884	Princeton	1890	Lehigh	1896	Lehigh
1885	Harvard	1891	Johns Hopkins	1897	Lehigh
1886	Harvard	1892	Stevens Tech	1898	Johns Hopkins
1887	Harvard	1893	Lehigh		

=== USIULL and ILA champions 1899–1905 ===
U.S. Inter-University Lacrosse League and Intercollegiate Lacrosse Association

Bold indicates victory or tie in head-to-head game, or that such game was not played.

Year	USIULL winner (overall record)	ILA winner (overall record)	Notes, including head-to-head results between league winners	Schools claiming national championship^{#}
1899	**Cornell** (4–3–2)	**Johns Hopkins** (4–1)	Cornell and Hopkins did not play each other in 1899.	Johns Hopkins
1900	tie: Columbia (2–4–2) and Harvard (1–2–1)	**Johns Hopkins** (6–1)	Johns Hopkins def. Columbia during season, 5–0. Columbia def. Harvard during season, 6–3. USIULL declared co-champions, each with record of 1–1–1 in league standings.	Johns Hopkins
1901	**Harvard** (4–2)	None	Johns Hopkins withdrew from the ILA in protest of violent play in its 1900 game with Stevens. Stevens def. Lehigh in the only ILA game of 1901.	Swarthmore* (def. Hopkins, 4–2, after Hopkins def. Harvard, 4–0)
1902	**Cornell** (4–2)	**Johns Hopkins** (6–1)	Cornell and Hopkins did not play each other in 1902.	Cornell, Johns Hopkins
1903	**Cornell** (2–4–1)	**Johns Hopkins** (4–2)	"The Inter-university Lacrosse Association held its usual series of games for the intercollegiate championship during 1903, but the season ended in a fizzle. Five games were actually played, and Columbia forfeited 1 game to Harvard, Columbia and Cornell each winning 2 and losing 1, while Harvard and the University of Pennsylvania each won 1 and lost 2. This left Cornell and Columbia tied for the championship, but each protested players on the other's team, and both protests were upheld, ... with the two leading teams disqualified, [ ] the season was unsatisfactory to all concerned." In February 1904, "[i]t was unanimously voted to award to Cornell the championship of the Inter-University League for last year." Cornell and Hopkins did not play each other in 1903.	Cornell, Johns Hopkins
1904	Harvard (3–4–1)	**Swarthmore** (10–1)	Swarthmore def. Harvard during season, 6–3	Swarthmore
1905	3-way tie: Cornell (3–6–1), Harvard (4–5) & Columbia (6–3)	**Swarthmore** (7–1)	Swarthmore def. Harvard, 6–2, and Cornell, 9–0. Cornell def. Harvard, 6–4. Harvard def. Columbia, 8–1. Columbia def. Cornell, 4–2.	Swarthmore

* Swarthmore joined the ILA in 1902. Although not a member of a league in either 1900 or 1901, Swarthmore had a leading team in 1901, which is a credible championship claim.

# Championship or co-championship claims, as published in school media guide, record book or yearbook

=== USILL champions 1906–1925 ===
The USILL (United States Inter-Collegiate Lacrosse League, also USICLL) was a closed membership organization. Some strong teams of the era, such as Army and Navy, were never members, so that in some years, the USILL champion was not necessarily the best team in the United States.

The members of the USILL in 1906 were Columbia University, Cornell University, Harvard University, Johns Hopkins University, Lehigh University, University of Pennsylvania, Stevens Institute of Technology and Swarthmore College. In 1907, Hobart College became a member, and Penn withdrew. As had been the rule for over two decades, 12 players per side constituted a team, and the USILL was split into Northern and Southern divisions, corresponding to the former IULL and ILA, respectively.

Bold indicates victory or tie in head-to-head game, or that such game was not played. Italics indicates victory in intra-division head-to-head game (1909, 1923) or tie-breaker (1922).

Year	Northern Div. winner * (overall record)	Southern Div. winner * (overall record)	Result of head-to-head games between USILL division winners	Schools claiming national championship^{#}
1906	Cornell (3–4–2)	**Johns Hopkins** (6–0)	Johns Hopkins def. Cornell during season, 9–0	Johns Hopkins
1907	**Cornell** (7–0)	**Johns Hopkins** (5–1)	none	Cornell, Johns Hopkins
1908	Harvard (4–4)	**Johns Hopkins** (8–1)	Johns Hopkins def. Harvard during season, 6–3	Harvard, Johns Hopkins
1909	Harvard (4–3) & Columbia (4–4)	**Johns Hopkins** (6–1)	Johns Hopkins def. Harvard during season, 11–1. Harvard def. Columbia during season, 5–2.	Harvard, Johns Hopkins
1910	Harvard (5–4)	**Swarthmore** (7–2)	Swarthmore def. Harvard during season, 11–7	Harvard, Swarthmore
1911	Harvard (5–2)	**Johns Hopkins** (7–1)	Johns Hopkins def. Harvard during season, 3–2	Harvard, Johns Hopkins
1912	**Harvard** (6–2)	Swarthmore (6–3–1)	Harvard def. Swarthmore in post-season playoff game, 7–3	Harvard
1913	Harvard (7–2)	**Johns Hopkins** (6–1–1)	Johns Hopkins def. Harvard during season, 6–3	Harvard, Johns Hopkins
1914	**Cornell** (6–2–2)	**Lehigh** (6–1–1)	Lehigh and Cornell tied during season, 1–1	Cornell, Lehigh
1915	Harvard (5–3)	**Johns Hopkins** (7–0–1)	Johns Hopkins def. Harvard during season, 8–1	Harvard, Johns Hopkins
1916	Cornell (5–3)	**Lehigh** (6–1)	Lehigh def. Cornell during season, 5–4	Cornell, Lehigh
1917^{♦}	none	**Lehigh** (4–0)	Stevens Tech (1–3–1) was the only active Northern Division team. Johns Hopkins was the only inactive Southern Division team. Lehigh did not face Stevens.	Lehigh, Stevens Tech
1918^{♦}	none	**Johns Hopkins** (3–3–1)	none (Stevens Tech (3–1–1) def. Yale in the only Northern Division game.)	Johns Hopkins, Stevens Tech
1919^{♦}	**Hobart** (3–2)	**Johns Hopkins** (7–1)	none	Johns Hopkins
1920	Syracuse (5–3–4)	**Lehigh** (6–2)	Lehigh def. Syracuse during season, 4–1	Syracuse, Lehigh
1921	Syracuse (11–3–1)	**Lehigh** (8–1)	Lehigh def. Syracuse in post-season playoff game, 3–1	Lehigh
1922	**Syracuse** (17–0): Syracuse media guide notes the team with 16 wins in 1922.	3-way tie (division records of 3–1 before scheduled playoff games): Penn (5–8), Johns Hopkins (7–4) & Lehigh (5–5) [records include defaults]	During the season Syracuse def. both Penn, 5–1, and Johns Hopkins, 3–1. Also, Penn def. Hopkins, 5–3; Hopkins def. Lehigh, 3–1; and Lehigh def. Penn, 3–1. A Southern Division tie-breaker playoff was arranged with Hopkins to play at Lehigh, and the winner to meet Penn. However, Hopkins defaulted to Lehigh, and Lehigh then refused to play Penn, except in a series. Thus Penn was declared winner of the Southern Division by default.	Syracuse, Johns Hopkins
1923	Syracuse (10–3–2) & Cornell (6–2)	**Johns Hopkins** (6–2)	Army^ (8–1–1) def. Syracuse during season, 3–2. Cornell def. Syracuse during season, 3–1.	Johns Hopkins, Army^
1924	**Syracuse** (13–0–1)	**Johns Hopkins** (7–2)	none	Syracuse, Johns Hopkins
1925	**Syracuse** (14–1)	**Maryland** (4–1–1)	none	Syracuse

* Division champions were selected based on results of intra-division games, difficulty of schedule and number of wins.

# Championship or co-championship claims, as published in school media guide, record book or yearbook

^{♦} In 1917–1919, World War I and the influenza epidemic curtailed lacrosse activity, as many schools eliminated or reduced schedules. Cornell, Harvard and Hobart did not field teams in 1917–1918. Yale and Johns Hopkins sat out 1917 only. Cornell did not return until 1920.

^ Not a USILL member

=== USILL championship tally ===
In four of the 20 years of the USILL's existence (1907, 1923, 1924, 1925), it was difficult to determine the national champion because the division winners did not play each other. In 1907 and 1924, both division winners claimed championships. In the other two years, Cornell (1923) and Maryland (1925) did not. In the war years of 1917 and 1918, Stevens Tech fielded the only Northern Division team to be active both years. Only one Northern intra-division game was played during that span, thus no Northern Division champion could be declared. However, by virtue of default and one win, the current Stevens Tech record book lists two championships.

Team	Championships	Winning years (1906–1925)
Johns Hopkins	11	1906, 1907†, 1908, 1909, 1911, 1913, 1915, 1918, 1919, 1923, 1924†
Lehigh	5	1914†, 1916, 1917, 1920, 1921‡
Syracuse	3	1922, 1924†, 1925
Cornell	2	1907†, 1914†
Swarthmore	1	1910
Harvard	1	1912‡

† Co-champion

‡ Won a post-season playoff game for the championship

=== USILA champions 1926–1935 ===
In 1926, the USILL disbanded and formed the USILA as an open-membership governing body. In addition to the former league's 12 schools, six others were soon admitted as members. From 1926–1931, the USILA executive board awarded gold medals after each season to the teams it selected as the most outstanding in the nation.

Year	Champion
1926	Johns Hopkins
1927	Johns Hopkins
1928	Johns Hopkins, Maryland, Navy, Rutgers
1929	Navy, Union College
1930	St. John's
1931	St. John's
1932	Johns Hopkins†
1933	Johns Hopkins†
1934	Johns Hopkins†
1935	Princeton†

† The USILA did not name champions for the 1932–1935 seasons. The teams listed claim the national championship based on being the leading team in the nation for these years.

=== USILA champions 1936–1972 ===
The Wingate Memorial Trophy was the award given to the United States Intercollegiate Lacrosse Association (USILA) national champion in men's college lacrosse from 1936 to 1970.

From 1953–1959, all college teams were placed in one of three divisions, dependent upon their records, schedules, and success for the preceding five years, and a point system was created. Teams were required to play at least six games against teams in their own divisions. Teams were realigned every three years.

Year	Division I champion	Division II champion	Division III champion
	Cyrus Miller Trophy	Laurie Cox Trophy	Roy Taylor Trophy
1953	Princeton	Swarthmore	Stevens Tech
1954	Navy	Syracuse, Washington College	Union
1955	Maryland	Hofstra, Rutgers	New Hampshire
1956	Maryland	University of Baltimore	Colgate
1957	Johns Hopkins	Univ. of Baltimore	Colgate
1958	Army	Univ. of Baltimore	MIT, Dickinson
1959	Johns Hopkins, Maryland, Army	Univ. of Baltimore	MIT, Lehigh

=== Intercollegiate championship claims, 1881–1935 ===
In all years it existed (1882–1905), the ILA consisted of 3 to 5 teams, with league championships dominated by a few schools. Likewise, the USIULL had only 3 or 4 teams during 1899–1905, with only Cornell's 1903 league title claimed in the present as a championship. Several schools have claimed their Northern and Southern Division titles won during the USILL years as national championships (based on the results of 3 or 4 intra-division games), while others have not. Still others were acclaimed in their time as unofficial title winners based on being leading teams in the collegiate ranks in particular years. Non-league members were ineligible for official title consideration before 1926. The USILA awarded gold medals to leading teams from 1926–1931, but made no selections from 1932–1935.

Team	Championships	Years claimed^{#}
Johns Hopkins	24	1891, 1898, 1899, 1900, 1902, 1903, 1906, 1907, 1908, 1909, 1911, 1913, 1915, 1918, 1919, 1922, 1923, 1924, 1926, 1927, 1928, 1932§, 1933§, 1934§
Harvard	13	1881†, 1882, 1883, 1885, 1886, 1887, 1908, 1909, 1910, 1911, 1912‡, 1913, 1915
Lehigh	10	1890, 1893, 1895, 1896, 1897, 1914, 1916, 1917, 1920, 1921‡
Princeton	5	1883, 1884, 1888, 1889, 1935§
Stevens Tech	4	1892, 1894, 1917, 1918
Swarthmore	4	1901 1904, 1905, 1910
Cornell	4	1903, 1907, 1914, 1916
Syracuse	4	1920, 1922, 1924, 1925
Navy	2	1928, 1929
St. John's (MD)	2	1930, 1931
Yale	1	1883
Army	1	1923
Maryland	1	1928
Rutgers	1	1928
Union College	1	1929

# Championship or co-championship claims, as published in school media guide, record book or yearbook

§ The USILA did not name champions for the 1932–1935 seasons. School claims national championship based on being that year's leading team.

† Won a tournament conducted for the first collegiate national championship by the U.S. National Lacrosse Association.

‡ Won a post-season championship game between the winners of the USILL Northern and Southern Divisions.

==== Championships by state ====
State	Titles	University
Maryland	29	Johns Hopkins (24), Navy (2), St. John's MD (2), Maryland (1)
Pennsylvania	14	Lehigh (10), Swarthmore (4)
Massachusetts	13	Harvard (13)
(New York (state)) New York	10	Syracuse (4), Cornell (4), Army (1), Union College (1)
New Jersey	10	Princeton (5), Stevens Tech (4), Rutgers (1)
Connecticut	1	Yale (1)

=== Notes regarding intercollegiate champions ===
Year	Champion	Note
1891	Johns Hopkins	First of Johns Hopkins' 44 national titles; team went 5–1 defeating Lehigh, Stevens, Pennsylvania (twice) and club team Schuylkill Navy, with a lone loss to Schuylkill also.
1910	Swarthmore	Won championship with defeats of Harvard, Carlisle, Stevens, Navy, Lehigh, Johns Hopkins (a 16–3 win) and Johns Hopkins Alumni, and losses to Toronto University and club team Mt. Washington.
1914	Navy	Navy began a string of years in which its teams recorded some of the best collegiate records, although not as a member of the USILL. The team went 6–0–1, defeating Harvard, Baltimore City, Johns Hopkins, Swarthmore, as well as the eventual national co-champions, Lehigh and Cornell, with a tie against Carlisle.
1928, 1932	Johns Hopkins	Johns Hopkins won Olympic trial tournaments among the nation's leading teams and represented the United States in the 1928 and 1932 Summer Olympics.

=== College Lacrosse League active membership by year, 1882–1925 ===
C – Intercollegiate Lacrosse Association (ILA), 1882–1905
U – U.S. Inter-University Lacrosse League (USIULL), 1899–1905
L – U.S. Intercollegiate Lacrosse League (USILL), 1906–1925

The following table considers as inactive, for a particular year, a school that fielded no team (as in war years), as well as a school that did not have, or withdrew from, membership.

School	**1**; **8**; **8**; **2**	**1**; **8**; **8**; **3**	**1**; **8**; **8**; **4**	**1**; **8**; **8**; **5**	**1**; **8**; **8**; **6**	**1**; **8**; **8**; **7**	**1**; **8**; **8**; **8**	**1**; **8**; **8**; **9**	**1**; **8**; **9**; **0**	**1**; **8**; **9**; **1**	**1**; **8**; **9**; **2**	**1**; **8**; **9**; **3**	**1**; **8**; **9**; **4**	**1**; **8**; **9**; **5**	**1**; **8**; **9**; **6**	**1**; **8**; **9**; **7**	**1**; **8**; **9**; **8**	**1**; **8**; **9**; **9**	**1**; **9**; **0**; **0**	**1**; **9**; **0**; **1**	**1**; **9**; **0**; **2**	**1**; **9**; **0**; **3**	**1**; **9**; **0**; **4**	**1**; **9**; **0**; **5**	**1**; **9**; **0**; **6**	**1**; **9**; **0**; **7**	**1**; **9**; **0**; **8**	**1**; **9**; **0**; **9**	**1**; **9**; **1**; **0**	**1**; **9**; **1**; **1**	**1**; **9**; **1**; **2**	**1**; **9**; **1**; **3**	**1**; **9**; **1**; **4**	**1**; **9**; **1**; **5**	**1**; **9**; **1**; **6**	**1**; **9**; **1**; **7**	**1**; **9**; **1**; **8**	**1**; **9**; **1**; **9**	**1**; **9**; **2**; **0**	**1**; **9**; **2**; **1**	**1**; **9**; **2**; **2**	**1**; **9**; **2**; **3**	**1**; **9**; **2**; **4**	**1**; **9**; **2**; **5**
Princeton	C	C	C	C	C	C	C	C	C																																			
Harvard	C	C	C	C	C	C	C	C										U	U	U	U	U	U	U	L	L	L	L	L	L	L	L	L	L	L			L	L	L	L	L	L	L
NYU	C	C	C	C	C	C	C																																					
Columbia	C																	U	U	U	U	U	U	U	L	L	L	L	L															
Yale		C	C																																L		L	L	L	L	L	L	L	L
Stevens					C	C	C	C	C	C	C	C	C	C	C	C	C	C	C	C	C	C	C	C	L	L	L	L	L	L	L	L	L	L	L	L	L	L	L	L	L	L	L	L
Lehigh							C	C	C	C	C	C	C	C	C	C	C	C	C	C	C	C	C	C	L	L	L	L	L	L	L	L	L	L	L	L	L	L	L	L	L	L	L	L
Johns Hopkins									C	C	C	C	C	C	C	C	C	C	C		C	C	C	C	L	L	L	L	L	L	L	L	L	L	L		L	L	L	L	L	L	L	L
Cornell																		U	U	U	U	U	U	U	L	L	L	L	L	L	L	L	L	L	L				L	L	L	L	L	L
Penn																			U	U	U	U	U	U	L									L	L	L	L	L	L	L	L	L	L	L
Swarthmore																					C	C	C	C	L	L	L	L	L	L	L	L	L	L	L	L	L	L	L	L	L	L	L	L
Hobart																										L	L	L	L	L	L	L	L	L	L			L	L	L	L	L	L	L
Syracuse																																							L	L	L	L	L	L
Maryland																																											L	L
Penn State																																											L	L

== See also ==
- NCAA men's lacrosse championship
- Wingate Memorial Trophy
- College lacrosse
