= 2022 Army Black Knights men's lacrosse team =

Intercollegiate lacrosse season

2022 Army Black Knights men's lacrosse
- Conference: Patriot League
- Record: 12–4 (6–2 Patriot)
- Head coach: Joe Alberici (17th season)
- Assistant coaches: Kyle Georgalas; Connor Kubikowski; Justin Ward
- Captain: Brendan Nichtern
- Home stadium: Michie Stadium

The 2022 Army Black Knights men's lacrosse team represent the United States Military Academy in the 2022 NCAA Division I men's lacrosse season. The Black Knights are led by seventeenth-year head coach Joe Alberici and play their home games at Michie Stadium in West Point, New York. Army competes as a member of the Patriot League.

== Previous season ==
The Black Knights finished the 2021 season 7–4 overall, 5–2 in the Patriot League, losing in the conference semifinal to Loyola and failing to make the NCAA tournament.

== Preseason ==
=== Preseason poll ===
The Patriot League released their preseason poll on January 31, 2022 (voting was by conference head coaches and sports information directors). The Black Knights were picked to finish in third place and garnered two first-place votes.

Predicted finish	Team	Votes (1st place)
1	Loyola Maryland	126 (14)
2	Lehigh	109 (2)
3	Army	105 (2)
4	Navy	87
5	Boston University	69
6	Colgate	53
7	Bucknell	49
8	Lafayette	26
9	Holy Cross	16

=== Preseason All-Patriot League team ===
The Black Knights had four players picked to the preseason All-Patriot League team, placing the second-most in the conference. Additionally, three Black Knights garnered major award accolades: senior attack Brendan Nichtern was selected as the 2022 Patriot League Men's Lacrosse Preseason Offensive Player of the Year, senior defender Marcus Hudgins was selected as the 2022 Patriot League Men's Lacrosse Preseason Defensive Player of the Year, and senior goalie Wyatt Schupler was selected as the 2022 Patriot League Men's Lacrosse Preseason Goalkeeper of the Year.

- Bobby Abshire, Senior, Midfielder
- Marcus Hudgins, Senior, Defense
- Brendan Nichtern, Senior, Attack
- Wyatt Schupler, Senior, Goalie

== Standings ==
2022 Patriot League Men's Lacrosse Standings
	Conference record		Overall record	
	W	L	W	L
No. 12 Boston University † *	7	1	12	5
No. 17 Army	6	2	12	4
Loyola	6	2	8	8
Lehigh	5	3	8	7
Navy	5	3	9	6
Bucknell	3	5	9	6
Colgate	3	5	4	9
Lafayette	1	7	4	11
Holy Cross	0	8	1	13
Championship: May 8, 2022 † conference regular season champion; * indicates conference tournament champion Rankings: Inside Lacrosse Top 20 Poll; Source:; Updated May 14, 2022

== Schedule ==
Date	Time	Opponent	Rank	Site	TV	Result	Attendance
Regular season
February 12	12:00 p.m.	UMass*	No. 10	Michie Stadium · West Point, NY	ESPN+	W 14–13	512
February 19	1:00 p.m.	at No. 6 Rutgers*	No. 10	SHI Stadium · Piscataway, NJ	BTN+	L 10–13	1,247
February 23	3:00 p.m.	Siena*	No. 15	Michie Stadium · West Point, NY	ESPN+	W 20–10	413
February 26	12:00 p.m.	NJIT*	No. 15	Michie Stadium · West Point, NY	ESPN+	W 18–4	145
March 2	4:30 p.m.	at No. 14 Syracuse*	No. 12	Carrier Dome · Syracuse, NY	ACCN	W 17–13	2,342
March 6	12:00 p.m.	Holy Cross	No. 12	Michie Stadium · West Point, NY	ESPN+	W 14–8	593
March 11	7:00 p.m.	at Lafayette	No. 12	Fisher Stadium · Easton, PA	ESPN+	W 18–12	499
March 19	12:00 p.m.	Lehigh	No. 9	Michie Stadium · West Point, NY	ESPN+	L 10–11	763
March 26	1:00 p.m.	at Loyola	No. 16	Ridley Athletic Complex · Baltimore, MD	ESPN+	W 14–12	1,742
April 2	1:00 p.m.	at Bucknell	No. 13	Christy Mathewson–Memorial Stadium · Lewisburg, PA	ESPN+	W 10–9	325
April 9	3:30 p.m.	Colgate	No. 12	Michie Stadium · West Point, NY	CBSSN	W 13–11	1,341
April 16	3:00 p.m.	at No. 5 Cornell*	No. 12	Schoellkopf Field · Ithaca, NY	ESPN+	W 17–10	388
April 23	12:00 p.m.	Navy	No. 5	Michie Stadium · West Point, NY (rivalry)	CBSSN	L 11–12^{OT}	9,618
April 29	8:00 p.m.	at No. 15 Boston University	No. 16	Nickerson Field · Boston, MA	ESPN+	W 15–14	958
Patriot League Tournament
May 6	7:00 p.m.	vs. (3) Loyola	(2) No. 14	Nickerson Field · Boston, MA (Semifinals)	CBSSN	W 14–13	925
May 8	12:00 p.m.	at (1) No. 16 Boston University	(2) No. 14	Nickerson Field · Boston, MA (Championship)	CBSSN	L 10–14	857
*Non-conference game · Rankings from Inside Lacrosse Media Poll released prior to game · All times are in Eastern time

Schedule source:

== Rankings ==
Poll	Week															
Poll	Pre	1	2	3	4	5	6	7	8	9	10	11	12	13	14	15 (Final)
Inside Lacrosse	10	–	10	15	12	12	9	16	13	12	12	5	16	14	17	
USILA Coaches	13	11	12	14	13	12	10	16	13	14	12	6	14	14	15	
Nike/US Lacrosse	13	–	13	17	16	13	11	16	12	13	13	13	16	15	16	
