= 2021 Army Black Knights men's lacrosse team =

Intercollegiate lacrosse season

2021 Army Black Knights men's lacrosse
- Conference: Patriot League
- Record: 7–4 (5–2 Patriot)
- Head coach: Joe Alberici (16th season)
- Assistant coaches: Kyle Georgalas; Connor Kubikowski; Justin Ward
- Captains: Nicholas Garofano; Greg Coleman; Brendan Nichtern; Matthew Russell
- Home stadium: Michie Stadium

The 2021 Army Black Knights men's lacrosse team represented the United States Military Academy in the 2021 NCAA Division I men's lacrosse season. The Black Knights were led by sixteenth-year head coach Joe Alberici and played their home games at Michie Stadium in West Point, New York. Army competed as a member of the Patriot League.

== Previous season ==
In a season impacted by the COVID-19 pandemic, the Black Knights compiled a 6–2 (2–0 Patriot League) regular season record before the rest of the season was cancelled.

== Preseason ==
=== Preseason poll ===
The Patriot League released their preseason poll on February 5, 2021 (voting was by conference head coaches and sports information directors). The Black Knights were picked to finish in second place and garnered four first-place votes.

Predicted finish	Team	Votes (1st place)
1	Loyola Maryland	125 (13)
2	Army	111 (4)
3	Lehigh	104 (1)
4	Navy	77
5	Boston University	67
6	Bucknell	66
7	Holy Cross	40
8	Colgate	39
9	Lafayette	19

=== Preseason All-Patriot League team ===
The Black Knights had four players picked to the preseason All-Patriot League team, tied for second-most in the conference. Additionally, junior attack Brendan Nichtern was selected as the 2021 Patriot League Men's Lacrosse Preseason Offensive Player of the Year.

- Bobby Abshire, Junior, Midfielder
- Marcus Hudgins, Junior, Defense
- Brendan Nichtern, Junior, Attack
- Wyatt Schupler, Junior, Goalie

== Roster ==
The Army men's lacrosse roster as of February 5, 2021:

2021 Army Black Knights men's lacrosse roster
Attack: 6 Brayden Duncan, Freshman (6'3, 200); 9 Anthony Seymour, Sophomore (5'10, 185); 10 Drennan Greene, Senior (5'11, 180); 17 Daniel Ross, Senior (5'11, 192); 19 Aidan Byrnes, Junior (6'1, 195); 20 (C) Brendan Nichtern, Junior (6'0, 185); 26 Andrew Bregman, Sophomore (5'10, 180); 28 Paul Johnson, Sophomore (6'1, 195); 46 Connor Funck, Freshman (5'9, 160); 99 Luke Hickam, Freshman (6'0 212); Faceoff Specialist: 4 Ethan Barangan, Junior (5'7, 181); 31 Ryan Pedrani, Sophomore (5'9, 180); 37 Russell Eberding, Sophomore (6'0, 195); 42 Stevie Grabher, Sophomore (6'0, 182); 55 Hunter Mazur, Sophomore (5'9, 176); Long Stick Midfielder: 25 Joey Stillings, Sophomore (6'3, 220); 48 Jack Szalankiewicz, Freshman (6'1, 195); 57 Zane Mazur, Sophomore (6'0, 175); 58 Brandon Gibson, Freshman (5'8, 180); 77 Kyle Beyer, Senior (6'3, 220); 88 Chase Gedney, Junior (6'5, 218)	Midfield: 0 (C) Nicholas Garofano, Senior (5'11, 195); 1 Gunner Philipp, Junior (5'10, 180); 7 Ryan Sposito, Sophomore (5'8, 170); 14 Bobby Abshire, Junior (6'2, 205); 15 Quinn Binney, Sophomore (6'1, 195); 16 James Pryor, Junior (6'3, 210); 18 Alex Evangelista, Junior (6'1, 200); 22 Doug Jones, Junior (6'0, 200); 23 Danny Kielbasa, Junior (6'1, 205); 30 Liam Davenport, Junior (5'11, 180); 32 Trevor Kelly, Freshman (6'0, 200); 33 Jack Davies, Senior (6'2, 200); 35 Cole Erickson, Freshman (6'0, 185); 41 Reese Burek, Sophomore, (6'1, 195); 43 Bailey O'Connor, Freshman (6'0, 188); 45 Nickolas Edinger, Senior (6'0, 190); 47 Andrew Kelly, Sophomore (5'7, 170); 49 Mike Tangredi, Freshman (6'0, 228); 50 Bo Waters, Junior (6'3, 205); 52 Matthew Horace, Junior (6'2, 215); 66 Alex Gekas, Freshman (6'3, 191); 90 Jacob Morin, Sophomore (6'2, 215); Defensive Midfielder: 40 Eamon Murphy, Freshman (6'1, 205); 44 Brendan Ryan, Senior (6'1, 205); 81 Jackson Tyler, Sophomore (6'3, 210)	Defense: 3 Brent Hauck, Junior (6'0, 190); 5 Jack Whalen, Senior (6'0, 210); 8 Deacon Donaldson, Sophomore (6'5, 193); 11 Marcus Hudgins, Junior (6'1, 200); 12 (C) Matthew Russell, Senior (6'2, 210); 24 Tyler Olbrich, Junior (5'10, 190); 27 Bryan Lehman, Junior (6'1, 185); 29 Jake Bieler, Junior (6'0, 210); 36 Ned Lynch, Freshman (6'0, 186); 51 Jack Rigley, Freshman (6'2, 210); 54 Cole Biggins, Freshman (6'0, 195); 91 Jack Weigand, Junior (6'3, 220); 98 Mitch McEntee, Freshman (6'3, 180); Goalie: 2 Knox Dent, Sophomore (5'11, 190); 13 (C) Greg Coleman, Senior 5'8, 165; 21 Wyatt Schupler, Junior (6'0, 185); 34 Kyle Walker, Sophomore (6'0, 200); 60 Matt Chess, Freshman (6'0, 185)

== Standings ==
Patriot League men's lacrosse was split into two divisions for the 2021 season; a four-team North division and a five-team South division. The top-three teams in both divisions will qualify for the Patriot League Championship tournament held in May. The divisional winner with the best overall winning percentage will earn the right to host the semifinals and finals. The No. 2 and No. 3 seeds from each division will play each other in the quarterfinals, with the winner playing the opposite division's No. 1 seed in the semifinals. Only the first game played against divisional opponents counts towards the division standings.

2021 Patriot League Men's Lacrosse Standings
	Division record		Conference record		Overall record	
	W	L	W	L	W	L
North
No. 13 Army	3	0	5	2	7	4
Boston University	2	1	4	2	6	5
Colgate	1	2	2	4	3	7
Holy Cross	0	3	1	3	2	4
South
No. 8 Lehigh *	4	0	8	0	10	1
No. 12 Loyola	3	1	4	3	9	5
No. 17 Navy	2	2	4	2	6	3
Bucknell	1	3	1	5	2	6
Lafayette	0	4	0	8	0	11
Championship: May 9, 2021 † conference regular season champion not awarded in 2021; * indicates conference tournament champion Rankings: Inside Lacrosse Top 20 Poll; Source:; Updated May 9, 2021

== Schedule ==
Date	Time	Opponent	Rank	Site	TV	Result	Attendance
Regular Season
~~February 13~~	~~Noon~~	~~at No. 14 UMass~~	~~No. 15~~	~~Garber Field · Amherst, MA~~	~~LSN~~	Cancelled	
February 14	Noon	at No. 6 Virginia	No. 15	Klöckner Stadium · Charlottesville, VA	ACCNX	L 9–14	0
February 21	Noon	at No. 4 Syracuse	No. 13	Carrier Dome · Syracuse, NY	ACCN	W 18–11	0
February 27	Noon	Saint Joseph's	No. 7	Michie Stadium · West Point, NY	ESPN+	W 13–5	0
March 6	Noon	at Boston University	No. 7	Nickerson Field · Boston, MA	ESPN+	W 12–10	0
~~March 27~~	~~3:00 p.m.~~	~~Bucknell~~	~~No. 8~~	~~Michie Stadium · West Point, NY~~	~~ESPN+~~	Cancelled	
March 27	3:00 p.m.	Holy Cross^{[a]}	No. 8	Michie Stadium · West Point, NY	ESPN+	W 13–3	200
April 3	1:00 p.m.	at No. 10 Lehigh	No. 7	Frank Banko Field · Bethlehem, PA	ESPN+	L 12–13	196
April 10	1:00 p.m.	at No. 13 Loyola	No. 10	Ridley Athletic Complex · Baltimore, MD	CBSSN	W 12–7	0
April 17	2:00 p.m.	Boston University	No. 10	Michie Stadium · West Point, NY	ESPN+	W 14–8	100
April 24	Noon	at No. 19 Navy	No. 10	Navy–Marine Corps Memorial Stadium · Annapolis, MD (rivalry)	CBSSN	L 4–9	5,285
April 30	2:00 p.m.	Colgate^{[b]}	No. 11	Michie Stadium · West Point, NY	ESPN+	W 13–11	100
Patriot League Tournament
May 7	7:00 p.m.	vs. No. 16 Loyola	No. 11	Frank Banko Field · Bethlehem, PA (Semifinals)	CBSSN	L 10–11	261
Rankings from Inside Lacrosse Media Poll released prior to game · All times are in Eastern time

^{^[a]} The game between Holy Cross and Army was originally scheduled for March 20 but was postponed due to a positive Covid-19 test within the Black Knights' Tier 1.
^{^[b]} The game between Colgate and Army was originally scheduled for March 13 but was postponed due to a positive Covid-19 test within the Black Knights' Tier 1.

Schedule source:

== Rankings ==
Poll	Week															
Poll	Pre	1	2	3	4	5	6	7	8	9	10	11	12	13	14	15 (Final)
Inside Lacrosse	15	–	13	7	7	7	7	8	7	10	10	10	11	11	13	13
USILA Coaches	NR	12	12	6	6	6	6	7	7	11	11	10	14	14	13	13
Nike/US Lacrosse	15	14	15	7	7	7	5	4	4	9	9	8	10	9	12	12
