= Bucknell Bison men's lacrosse =

- Founded: 1968
- University: Bucknell University
- Head coach: Frank Fedorjaka (16th season)
- Stadium: Christy Mathewson–Memorial Stadium (capacity: 13,100)
- Location: Lewisburg, Pennsylvania
- Conference: Patriot League
- Nickname: Bison
- Colors: Blue and orange

NCAA Tournament appearances
- (2) – 2001, 2011

Conference Tournament championships
- (1) – 2011

Conference regular season championships
- (12) – 1969, 1978, 1985, 1996, 2000, 2001, 2002, 2003, 2005, 2009, 2011, 2018

The Bucknell Bison men's lacrosse team represents Bucknell University in the Patriot League of the National Collegiate Athletic Association (NCAA) Division I men's lacrosse. Bucknell has played lacrosse at the varsity level since 1968.

== History ==
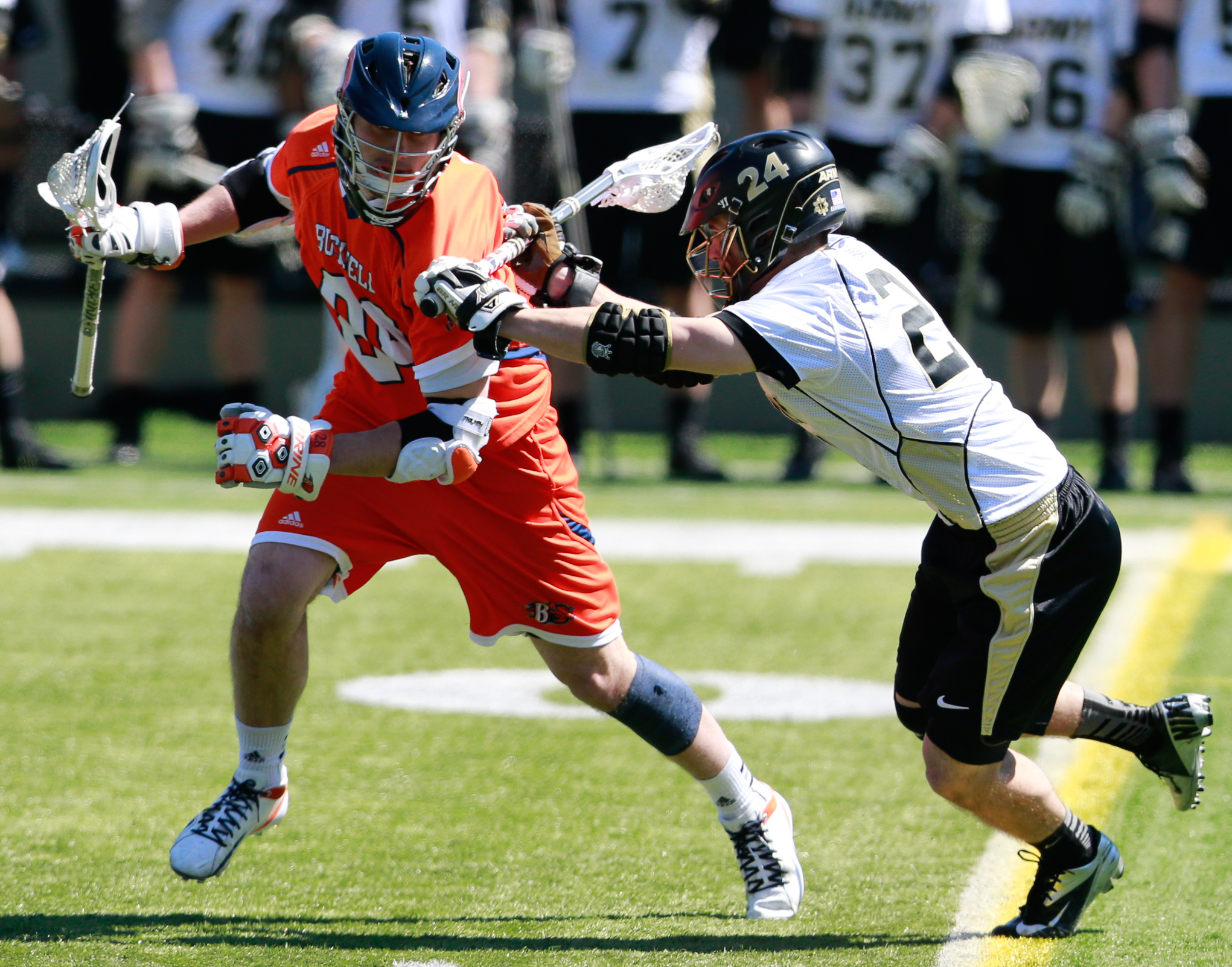
A lacrosse game between Bucknell and Army in 2013

The Bucknell lacrosse team was founded in 1968, as a member of the Middle Atlantic Conference (MAC). They went 6-3 that year and undefeated in conference. They won the MAC title the next year. In 1975, they joined the East Coast Conference, which they won twice, in 1978 and 1985. In 1991, they joined the Patriot League. They have won the Patriot League regular season title nine times, in 1996, 2000, 2001, 2002, 2003, 2005, 2009, 2011, and 2018. In 2001, they played in their first NCAA tournament game, which Notre Dame won 12–7. In 2005, the only coach they had ever had, Sid Jamieson, retired. He was replaced with Frank Fedorjaka, who has been their coach ever since. They won their only Patriot League championship in 2011, defeating Colgate University 10–3. They reached their second ever NCAA lacrosse tournament game that year, which they lost to the University of Virginia 13–12 in overtime. They currently compete as a member of the Patriot League and play their home games in Lewisburg, Pennsylvania at Christy Mathewson–Memorial Stadium.

=== Undefeated 1996 season (12–0) ===
Mount Saint Mary's, 15–10
Penn, 6–4
Holy Cross, 18–3
Army, 14–10
Villanova, 10–5
Navy, 6–5
Hobart, 12–8
Lehigh, 9–7
Penn State, 11–6
Colgate, 11–3
UMBC, 13–8
Lafayette, 21–5

== Season results ==
The following is a list of Bucknell's results by season since the institution of NCAA Division I in 1971:

Season	Coach	Overall	Conference	Standing	Postseason
Sid Jamieson (Middle Atlantic Conference) (1968–1974)
1968	Sid Jamieson	6–3	4–0	N/A	
1969	Sid Jamieson	10–1	7–0	1st	
1970	Sid Jamieson	7–3	4–2	4th	
1971	Sid Jamieson	6–5	6–2	4th	
1972	Sid Jamieson	4–7	4–3	7th	
1973	Sid Jamieson	5–8	5–2	6th	
1974	Sid Jamieson	6–6	5–2	5th	
Sid Jamieson (East Coast Conference) (1975–1990)
1975	Sid Jamieson	5–6	3–1	2nd	
1976	Sid Jamieson	6–5	3–1	2nd	
1977	Sid Jamieson	6–6	3–1	2nd	
1978	Sid Jamieson	7–4	3–1	1st	
1979	Sid Jamieson	7–4	3–1	2nd	
1980	Sid Jamieson	7–5	3–1	2nd	
1981	Sid Jamieson	3–10	1–3	4th	
1982	Sid Jamieson	3–9	3–1	2nd	
1983	Sid Jamieson	6–8	2–3	4th	
1984	Sid Jamieson	6–6	2–3	4th	
1985	Sid Jamieson	8–5	4–1	1st	
1986	Sid Jamieson	4–7	1–4	3rd	
1987	Sid Jamieson	7–7	4–2	3rd	
1988	Sid Jamieson	4–10	2–4	4th	
1989	Sid Jamieson	7–7	3–3	4th	
1990	Sid Jamieson	5–9	3–3	4th	
Sid Jamieson (Patriot League) (1991–2005)
1991	Sid Jamieson	6–7	3–2	3rd	
1992	Sid Jamieson	7–6	3–2	2nd	
1993	Sid Jamieson	6–9	1–4	5th	
1994	Sid Jamieson	6–7	3–2	3rd	
1995	Sid Jamieson	7–6	2–3	4th	
1996	Sid Jamieson	12–0	5–0	1st	
1997	Sid Jamieson	3–10	2–3	4th	
1998	Sid Jamieson	6–8	2–3	4th	
1999	Sid Jamieson	7–6	3–2	3rd	
2000	Sid Jamieson	8–4	5–1	T–1st	
2001	Sid Jamieson	10–4	6–0	1st	NCAA Division I First Round
2002	Sid Jamieson	6–7	5–1	T–1st	
2003	Sid Jamieson	9–4	5–1	T–1st	
2004	Sid Jamieson	6–8	4–3	3rd	
2005	Sid Jamieson	8–5	5–1	T–1st	
Sid Jamieson:		242–232 (.511)	142–72 (.664)		
Frank Fedorjaka (Patriot League) (2006–Present)
2006	Frank Fedorjaka	7–7	2–4	5th	
2007	Frank Fedorjaka	11–4	4–2	3rd	
2008	Frank Fedorjaka	10–5	4–2	T–3rd	
2009	Frank Fedorjaka	9–7	6–0	1st	
2010	Frank Fedorjaka	8–6	3–3	4th	
2011	Frank Fedorjaka	14–3	6–0	1st	NCAA Division I First Round
2012	Frank Fedorjaka	9–7	3–3	4th	
2013	Frank Fedorjaka	12–4	5–1	2nd	
2014	Frank Fedorjaka	7–8	4–4	T–4th	
2015	Frank Fedorjaka	9–6	5–3	T–3rd	
2016	Frank Fedorjaka	10–5	5–3	T–3rd	
2017	Frank Fedorjaka	5–8	3–5	T–7th	
2018	Frank Fedorjaka	11–4	7–1	T–1st	
2019	Frank Fedorjaka	6–9	4–4	6th	
2020	Frank Fedorjaka	5–1	0–0	†	†
2021	Frank Fedorjaka	2–6	1–5	4th (South)	
2022	Frank Fedorjaka	9–6	3–5	T–6th	
2023	Frank Fedorjaka	3–10	2–6	T–7th	
2024	Frank Fedorjaka	4–10	2–6	T–7th	
2025	Frank Fedorjaka	5–9	2–6	8th	
2026	Frank Fedorjaka	5–2	1–1		
Frank Fedorjaka:		163–127 (.562)	70–62 (.530)		
Total:		405–359 (.530)			
National champion Postseason invitational champion Conference regular season champion Conference regular season and conference tournament champion Division regular season champion Division regular season and conference tournament champion Conference tournament champion

†NCAA canceled 2020 collegiate activities due to the COVID-19 virus.

== Bucknell Lacrosse Hall of Fame ==
James W. McKee, M
C. Edwin Farver, M
Louis L. Kissling, Jr., A
Ralph Turri, M
Thomas H. Sanders, G
Peter W. von Hoffman, A
Rodney Brown, M/D
Thomas E. Cusick, A
Justin W. Zackey, A
Hugh Donovan, D
Chris Cara, A
Sid Jamieson, Coach

== See also ==
- Bucknell Bison
- Lacrosse in Pennsylvania
