= Crown Field at Andy Kerr Stadium =

Stadium named for the football coach

Andy Kerr Stadium
- Interactive map of Andy Kerr Stadium
- Full name: Crown Field at Andy Kerr Stadium
- Former names: Colgate Athletic Field (1939–1966)
- Location: 13 Oak Drive; Hamilton, NY 13346
- Coordinates: 42.816944°N 75.5452°W
- Owner: Colgate University
- Operator: Colgate University Athletics
- Capacity: 10,221
- Type: Stadium
- Surface: FieldTurf
- Current use: Football; Lacrosse

Construction
- Opened: 1939; 87 years ago
- Renovated: September 1966

Tenants
- Colgate Raiders (NCAA) teams: football (1939–present), lacrosse

Website
- colgateathletics.com/andy-kerr-stadium

Crown Field at Andy Kerr Stadium is a 10,221-seat multi-purpose stadium in Hamilton, New York, United States. It is the home of Colgate University's football and men's lacrosse teams.

Colgate opened the stadium in 1939, originally as "Colgate Athletic Field". Colgate's football teams – then known as the Red Raiders and competing at the highest level of NCAA play – were coached during the stadium's inaugural year by Andy Kerr, who led the team from 1929 to 1946.

The stadium adopted the name Andy Kerr Stadium on "Andy Kerr Day" on September 17, 1966, before a crowd of 8,000. The 87-year-old former coach was on hand to greet well-wishers and witness a 34-0 Colgate football victory over Boston University.

Parts of the stadium have also been named to honor Raider athletes and coaches. A permanent main grandstand on the east (home team) side of the stadium was dedicated in 1991 to Frederick H. Dunlap, 1970s-80s football head coach and athletic director. The seven-lane, 400-meter running track around the field was dedicated to 1937 graduate R.L. Browning in September 1998; it serves as a training facility for 25 Colgate varsity programs.

In 2003, a new three-story press box was constructed behind the west stands of the stadium, named for 1950s and 1960s football coach Hal Lahar and 1970s football player Robert Abeltin. In 2006, the stadium added a new scoreboard with video capability. After lacrosse player Michael Crown and his parents supported the installation of lights and FieldTurf in 2007, it was renamed Crown Field at Andy Kerr Stadium in 2014.

== See also ==
- List of NCAA Division I FCS football stadiums
