= Christy Mathewson–Memorial Stadium =

Pennsylvania stadium

Coordinates: 40.9518715°N 76.8854034°W

Memorial Stadium

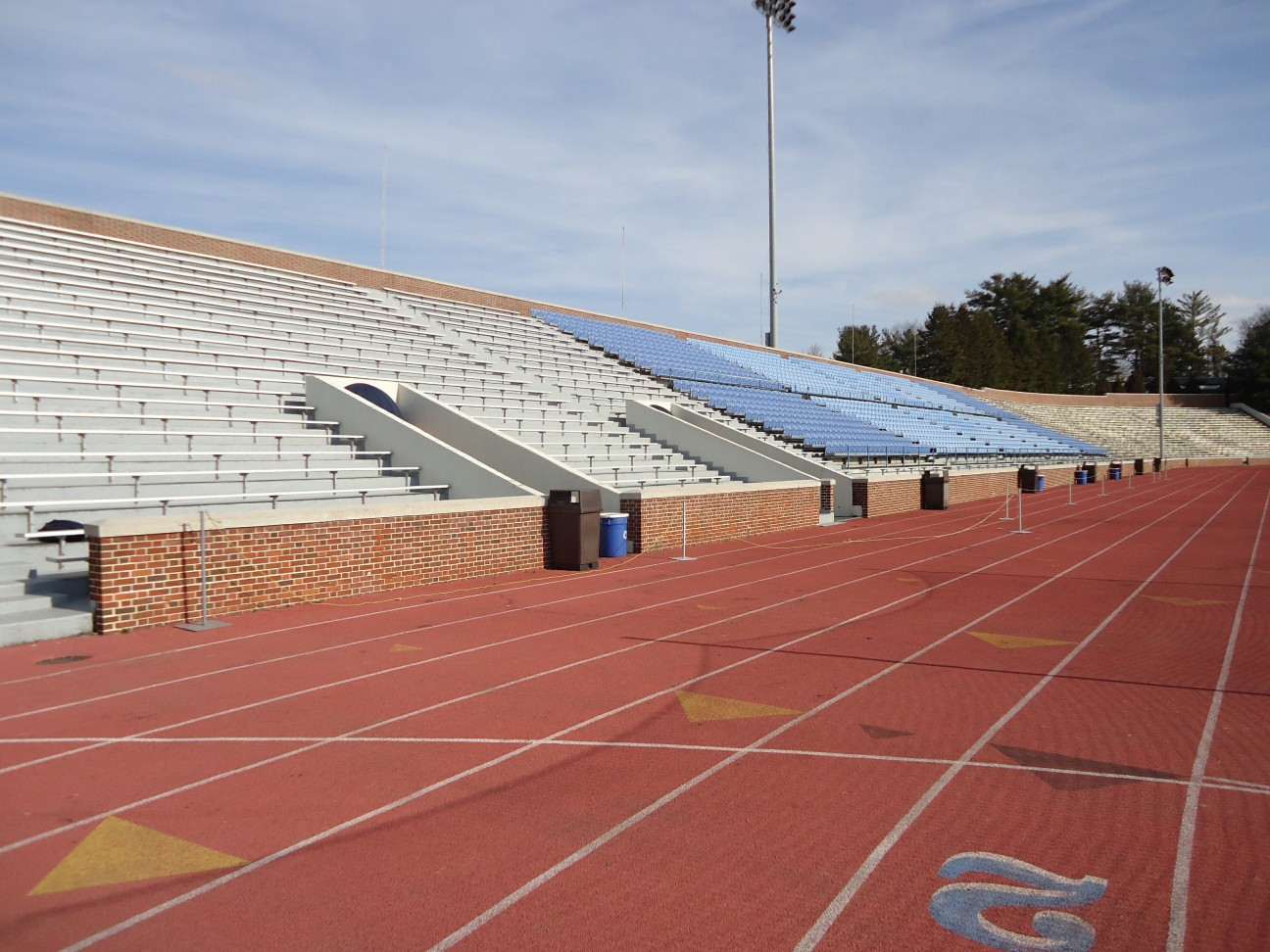
- Interior view of the stadium in 2012
- Interactive map of Memorial Stadium
- Full name: Christy Mathewson–Memorial Stadium
- Address: 701 Moore Avenue; Lewisburg, PA; United States
- Owner: Bucknell University
- Operator: Bucknell Univ. Athletics
- Capacity: 13,100 (1989–present); 14,000 (1941–1988); 18,000 (1924–1940)
- Type: Stadium
- Surface: FieldTurf
- Current use: Football; Lacrosse; Track and field

Construction
- Groundbreaking: March 17, 1924
- Opened: October 18, 1924; 102 years ago
- Renovated: 1960, 1989
- Cost: US$278,000 ($5.22 million in 2025 dollars)
- Architects: Carrere & Hastings
- General contractor: T. J. Foley Co.

Tenants
- Bucknell Bison (NCAA) teams: football (1924–present); men's lacrosse; track and field; Other teams: Lewisburg Area High School

Website
- bucknellbison.com/memorial-stadium

Christy Mathewson–Memorial Stadium is a 13,100-seat multi-purpose stadium at Bucknell University in Lewisburg, Pennsylvania. Originally built in 1924, the stadium was renovated and renamed in honor of Mathewson in 1989. It is home to the Bucknell Bison football, men's lacrosse, and track and field teams from the Patriot League, as well as the Lewisburg Area High School Green Dragons football team.

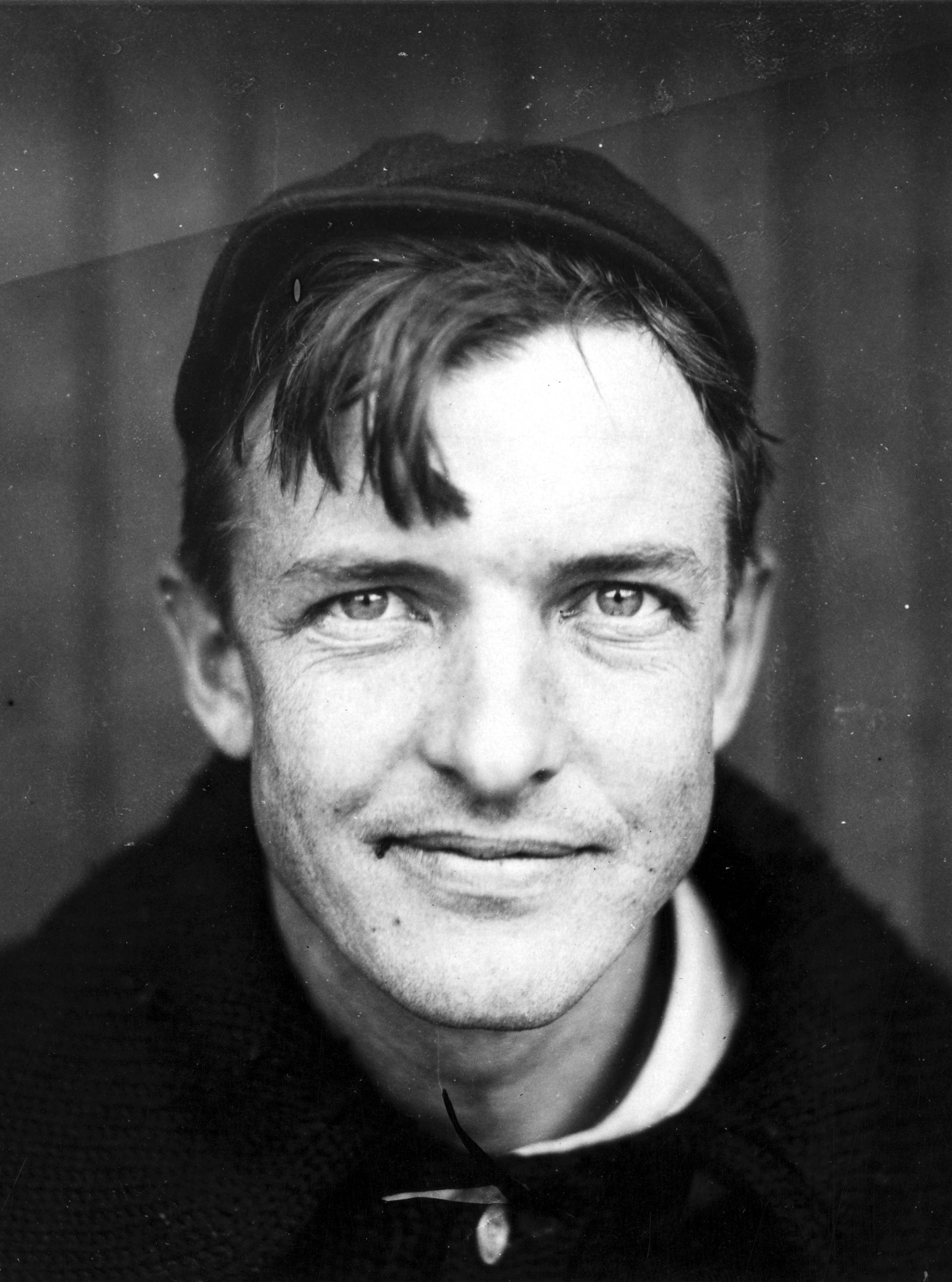
The stadium was named after Christy Mathewson (pictured)

Memorial Stadium is named for Christy Mathewson, a Bucknell alumnus who went on to become a Hall of Fame pitcher for the New York Giants in the early 20th century. Mathewson was on the Walter Camp All-American football team as a kicker while a student at Bucknell.

== Notable events ==
In 1990, the stadium hosted the first Patriot League men's soccer tournament final, when Fordham defeated Lafayette 1–0 on extra time to secure their first championship.

On April 17, 2021, Memorial Stadium hosted the first Patriot League Football Championship Game. Holy Cross beat Bucknell 33–10 for the Patriot League Football championship.

== See also ==
- List of NCAA Division I FCS football stadiums
