= Boston University Terriers men's lacrosse =

- Founded: 2014
- University: Boston University
- Head coach: Ryan Polley (since 2014 season)
- Stadium: Nickerson Field (capacity: 9,871)
- Location: Boston, Massachusetts
- Conference: Patriot League
- Nickname: Terriers
- Colors: Scarlet and white

NCAA Tournament appearances
- (1) – 2022

Conference Tournament championships
- (1) – 2022

Conference regular season championships
- (3) – 2022, 2023, 2026

The Boston University Terriers men's lacrosse team represents Boston University in National Collegiate Athletic Association (NCAA) Division I college lacrosse. The program was created in 2014. Boston U plays its home games at Nickerson Field, which has a capacity of 9,871. The Terriers have competed in the Patriot League since their 2014 founding. Through 2020, the team has an all–time record of 50–50.

In the team's inaugural season, Boston U scored its first-ever program victory with a 13 to 5 defeat of the Lafayette Leopards. In the program's short history, the Terriers defeated their first ranked foes in route to a 12–5 record in 2017, their best to date. During that campaign, the team upset #17 Navy 8–7 in Annapolis, Maryland, before topping the #19 Loyola Greyhounds 12–11 in an overtime showdown. The victory over the Greyhounds clinched the program's first berth in a Patriot League postseason game and first national ranking. However, a difficult defeat at the hands of Army in the semifinals of the Patriot League tournament denied the Terriers a shot at their first NCAA Division I Men's Lacrosse Championship appearance. In 2019, the Terriers again upset Loyola, ranked #2, in a resounding 7 point victory for the highest ranked victory in team history. The victory propelled Boston U to their third consecutive appearance in the Patriot League tournament. Additionally, sophomore attacker Chris Gray gained a 2019 Tewaaraton Award nomination and gained second-team All-American honors after the campaign, prior to his transfer to North Carolina.

== Season results ==
The following is a list of Boston U's results by season:

Season	Coach	Overall	Conference	Standing	Postseason
Ryan Polley (Patriot League) (2014–Present)
2014	Ryan Polley	2–12	2–6	7th	
2015	Ryan Polley	6–8	3–5	T–6th	
2016	Ryan Polley	8–7	3–5	T–6th	
2017	Ryan Polley	12–5	5–3	3rd	
2018	Ryan Polley	8–9	3–5	T–5th	
2019	Ryan Polley	11–6	5–3	T–2nd	
2020	Ryan Polley	3–3	1–0	†	†
2021	Ryan Polley	6–5	4–2	2nd (North)	
2022	Ryan Polley	12–5	7–1	1st (North)	NCAA Division I First Round
2023	Ryan Polley	10–4	7–1	T–1st	
2024	Ryan Polley	10–7	5–3	T–3rd	
2025	Ryan Polley	11–5	6–2	2nd	
2026	Ryan Polley	8–6	6–2	T–1st	
Ryan Polley:		107–83 (.563)	57–38 (.600)		
Total:		107–83 (.563)			
National champion Postseason invitational champion Conference regular season champion Conference regular season and conference tournament champion Division regular season champion Division regular season and conference tournament champion Conference tournament champion

†NCAA canceled 2020 collegiate activities due to the COVID-19 virus.
