= Bucknell Bison =

Intercollegiate sports teams of Bucknell University

- University: Bucknell University
- Conference: Patriot League (primary); MARC (rowing); EIWA (wrestling); MAWPC (water polo)
- NCAA: Division I (FCS)
- Athletic director: Tim Pavlechko (interim)
- Location: Lewisburg, Pennsylvania
- Varsity teams: 25
- Football stadium: Christy Mathewson–Memorial Stadium
- Basketball arena: Sojka Pavilion
- Baseball stadium: Eugene B. Depew Field
- Softball stadium: Becker Field
- Soccer stadium: Emmitt Field at Holmes Stadium
- Volleyball arena: Davis Gym
- Mascot: Bucky Bison
- Nickname: The Bison
- Fight song: 'ray Bucknell
- Colors: Blue and orange
- Website: www.bucknellbison.com

The Bucknell Bison are the athletic teams that represent Bucknell University. The program is a member of the Patriot League for most NCAA Division I sports and Division I FCS in football.

== List of sports ==
Men's sports	Women's sports
Baseball	Basketball
Basketball	Cross country
Cross country	Field hockey
Football	Golf
Golf	Lacrosse
Lacrosse	Rowing
Soccer	Soccer
Swimming & Diving	Softball
Tennis	Swimming & Diving
Track & field^{†}	Track & field^{†}
Water polo	Tennis
Wrestling	Volleyball
	Water polo
† – Track and field includes both indoor and outdoor.

== History ==
The Bucknell Bison are the athletic teams that represent Bucknell University. The program is a member of the Patriot League for most NCAA Division I sports and Division I FCS in football. Since 1923, the mascot has been Bucky Bison. Their fight song is 'ray Bucknell.

=== Football ===
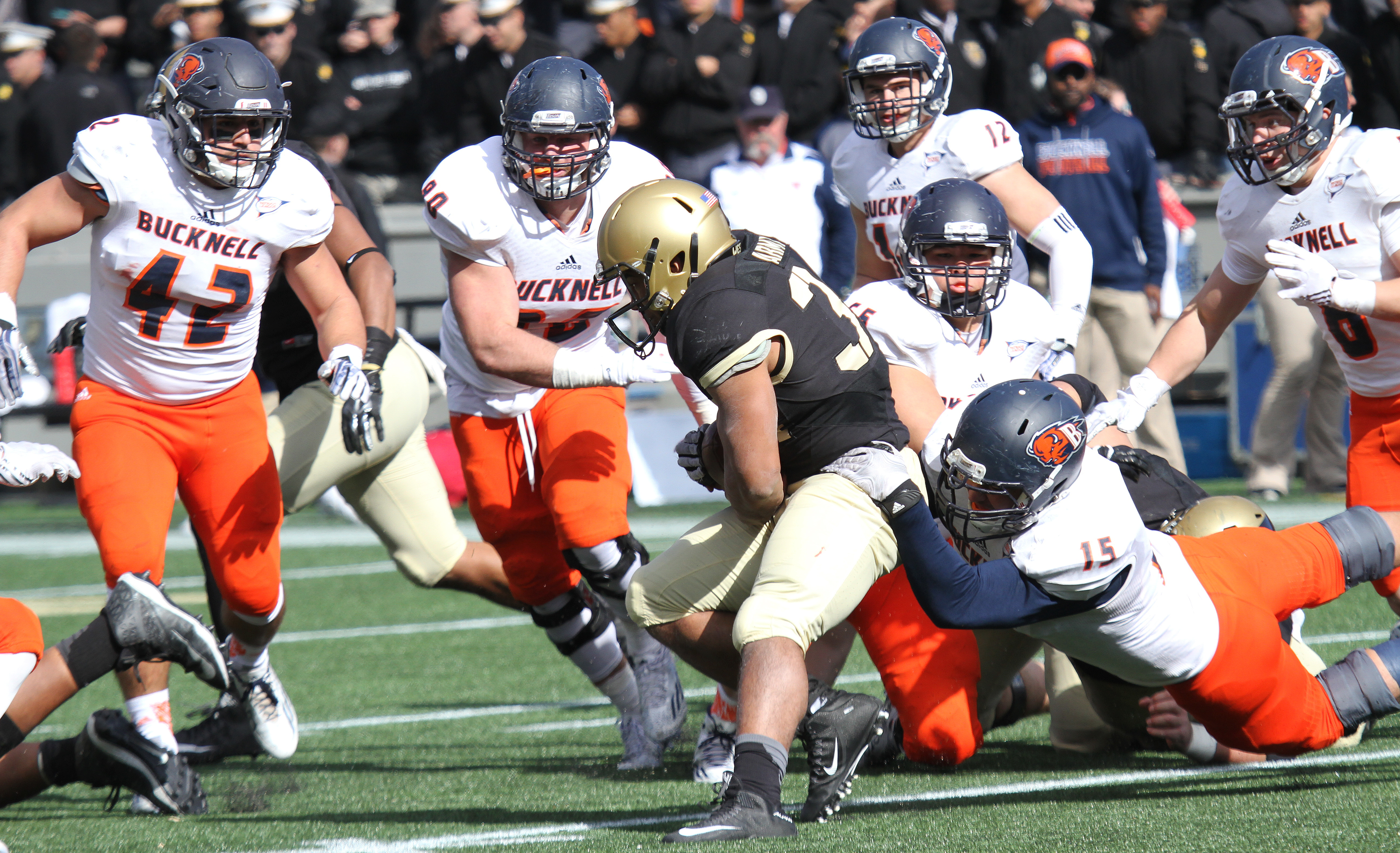
Bucknell defenders bring down an Army running back during a game in 2015

Bucknell won the first Orange Bowl (26–0 over the University of Miami on January 1, 1935).

=== Men's basketball ===
In 2005, the men's basketball team went to the NCAA men's basketball tournament and became the first Patriot League team to win an NCAA tournament game, in an upset of Kansas (64–63). The victory followed a year that included wins over #9 Pittsburgh and Saint Joseph's. They lost to Wisconsin in the following round, but received the honor of "Best Upset" at the 2005 ESPY Awards. In 2006, the Bison continued their success with high-profile victories at Syracuse, then ranked 19th, DePaul, and Saint Joseph's, a sequence that saw the Bison nearly enter the Associated Press's top-25 rankings. However, those wins were followed by high-profile losses against Villanova, then ranked fourth in the nation, and at Duke, then ranked first. Patriot League play began after the Duke loss, and the Bison did not lose a league game in 2006. The team was ranked 24th in the nation in both the Associated Press and ESPN/USA Today college basketball polls for the week of February 13. This was the Bucknell program's first national ranking, and the first time since the league's creation in 1990 that any Patriot League men's basketball team has been ranked. The team was seeded ninth in the Oakland bracket for the 2006 NCAA tournament, and defeated Arkansas in the first round (59–55). The Bison were defeated by Memphis in the second round, losing by a score of 72–56. They finished the regular season ranked 25th in the ESPN poll. Entering the 2006–2007 season, the Bison had scheduled a number of high-profile games, including a season opener against Wake Forest. The schedule also included a match-up against George Mason, a team that had made the 2006 Final Four. In a tight game, the Bison were defeated by Wake Forest 86–83 in overtime. They did, however, go on to defeat George Mason. Bucknell made it to the 2007 Patriot League Championship Game where they faced Holy Cross. The Bison lost by a score of 66–74.

=== Men's lacrosse ===
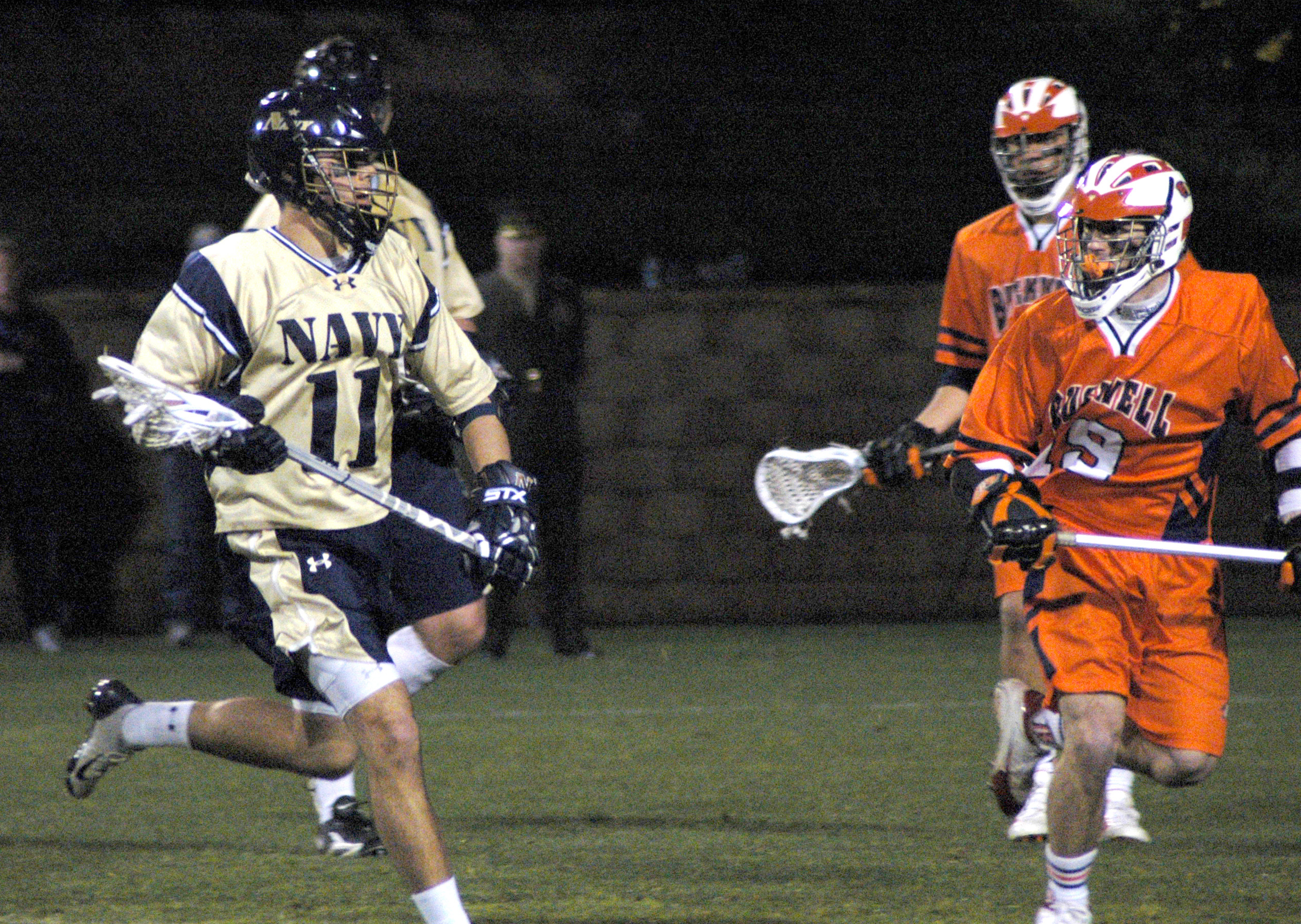
Bucknell versus Navy in 2006

Bucknell also has a reputable men's lacrosse program that is often nationally ranked. The team reached the NCAA Men's Lacrosse Championship in 2001. Former head coach Sid Jamieson is currently ranked 14th in all-time Division I wins. In 2005, the team upset No. 2 ranked Navy during the regular season, and again in 2006 the team upset No. 1 Maryland. In 2008, the team broke into the top 10 National Rankings for only the second time in school history.

=== Men's soccer ===
In 2006 the Bucknell Men's soccer team went on a surprise run to capture the Patriot League championship. In the semifinal they beat top seeded Lehigh in a game that went to a shootout. Then in the final they defeated Lehigh in a game that also ended in a shootout. This qualified them for the NCAA Soccer tournament. They faced George Mason in the first round and won on an overtime goal. In the second round they fell to fourth ranked Virginia.

=== Other sports ===
In 2003, Bucknell made history by becoming the only school in Patriot League history to capture both the Men's and Women's Patriot League Swimming Championship in the same season (2003). These teams were led by seniors Gonzalo Diaz, Christopher Feinthel, Michael Guskey, Geoffrey Konopka, Kurt "Russell" McCoy, Stelios Saffos and Stephen Schwanhausser on the Men's team and seniors Rebecca Dolan and Darby Golino on the Women's team. This historic win was accomplished at the newly opened Kinney Natatorium at Bucknell. The men's swimming and diving team also captured the Division II national championship in 1964.

In 2006 the Bucknell Women's rowing team won the Patriot League Championship and its Lightweight Women scored a 6th-place finish at the National Championship IRA Regatta. The following year the team repeated as Patriot League team champions, and the lightweight eight was crowned national champions at the IRA for the first time.

Beginning in the 2006–2007 season, Bucknell has re-instituted its men's wrestling program in response to a private donation of $5.6 million from wrestling alumnus William Graham, after it was originally dropped by the university in efforts to be in compliance with Title IX in 2001. In 2009, the team had a program record of 6 NCAA qualifiers. Since the Patriot League does not sponsor wrestling, Bucknell's team competes as a member of the EIWA.

In 2008, the Bucknell baseball team entered the Tallahassee regional of the NCAA tournament and upset Florida State, 7–0.

== National championships ==
=== Team ===
Association	Division	Sport	Year	Opponent Runner-Up	Score
NCAA	College Division	Men's Swimming	1964	East Carolina	83–50

== See also ==
- Lacrosse in Pennsylvania
