= Army–Navy lacrosse rivalry =

College sports rivalry

- Army Black Knights Navy Midshipmen
- First meeting: May 31, 1924; Navy 5, Army 0
- Latest meeting: April 11, 2026; Army 14, Navy 9

Statistics
- Total meetings: 106
- All-time series: Navy leads, 63–40–3
- Largest victory: Army, 13–2 (1940), 15–4 (1952); Navy, 18–7 (1965), 12–1 (1989, 2007)
- Longest win streak: Navy, 13 (1998–2007)
- Current win streak: Army, 4 (2023–present)

The Army–Navy lacrosse rivalry is an intercollegiate lacrosse rivalry between the Army Black Knights and the Navy Midshipmen. The two programs, historical rivals in other sports like football and soccer, have a fierce and nationally-relevant rivalry in lacrosse as well. With 25 national championships, 10 Final Fours in the NCAA era, and 190 consensus first team All-Americans, the two teams have been integral to the game's history. The rivalry carries a different spirit than many others in collegiate lacrosse, described by former Navy goalie Ryan Kern as: "It’s the same camaraderie that you had in the fall with the football game and it kind of comes out again in the spring with the lacrosse game,” Navy junior goalie Ryan Kern said. “No doubt, all the other sports are important, but just the sheer number of people that come to this game is crazy — just like the football game. You see 16,000 people come to a regular season lacrosse game, and that’s not happening at other lacrosse programs." After 103 meetings, Navy leads the series 63–37–3 through 2023.

== Series history ==
=== Pre-NCAA era (1924 to 1970) ===
The teams first met in 1924, with the Midshipmen shutting out Army 5–0 in West Point. The rematch occurred the next year in Annapolis, the second of four consecutive Navy victories to begin the series. A tie in 1928 was part of the Midshipmen's first national championship season and 7–1–1 record. That game was followed by a three goal Army win five years later, their first in the rivalry; the series has been played annually since. The 1940s were a high point for the rivalry, as Army would capture national championships in the 1944 and 1945 seasons, sharing the '45 title with the Midshipmen. Navy campaigns in 1943, 1946, and 1949 also resulted in titles during this period.

Another crucial period began in the late '50s, as either Army or Navy won at least a share of the Wingate Memorial Trophy every year from 1958 to 1970. The lone exception during this stretch was 1968, when Johns Hopkins won the national championship outright. Navy's dominance over the sport was only checked by the Black Knights, the only team from the 1959 to 1966 to defeat the Mids. '61 and '63 victories in Annapolis by the Cadets were the only by a collegiate program during this period. Both teams entered the 1964 game with identical 8–0 records, with Navy pulling off their first win of four straight victories.

=== Navy dominance (1970s to 2010) ===
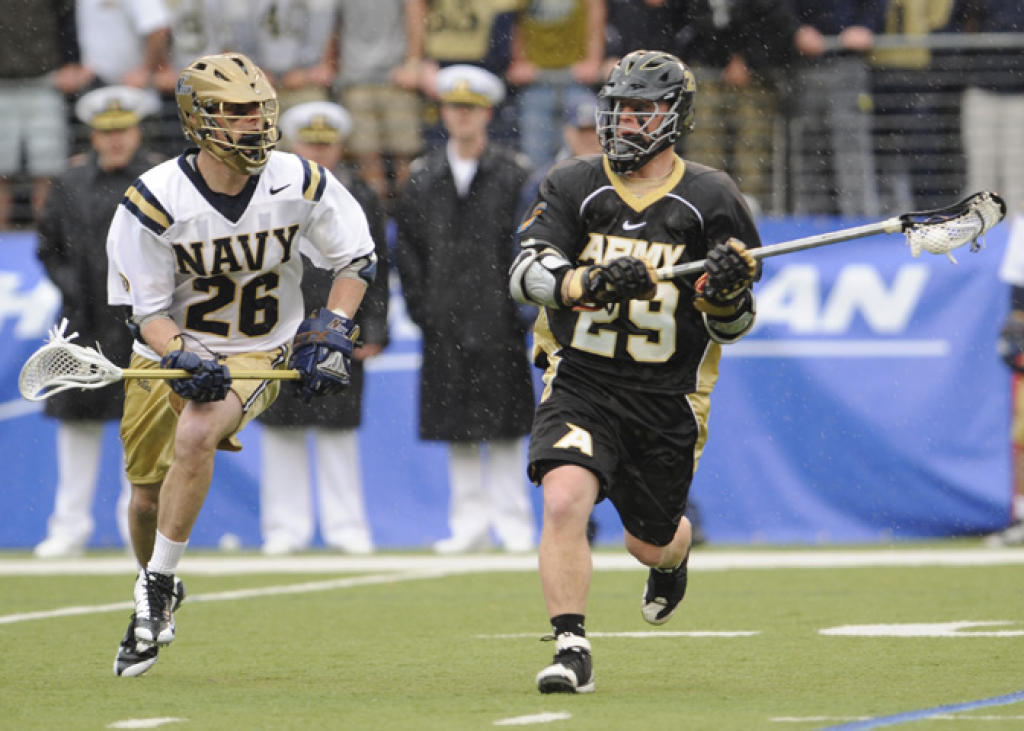
Army and Navy lacrosse midfielders in action during the Day of Rivals at M&T Bank Stadium in Baltimore, Maryland on April 11, 2009.

1970 ended with a three-way split of the national title between Navy, Hopkins, and Virginia. In the final game, Navy prevailed over Army to complete its undefeated season and secure a share of its 17th national title. The following year, the first NCAA Division I Men's Lacrosse Championship was held. The 1971 edition featured both the Cadets and Midshipmen, who both fell in the Final Four. Beginning in 1973, the Naval Academy would win its first of nine consecutive against Army, including a 16–13 victory in the 1978 NCAA tournament. The quarterfinals matchup was led by two Mids players, Mike Hannan and Mike Buzzell, with 6 and 5 goals respectively. In 1981, the Black Knights would halt the streak with a one goal victory in Annapolis. However, a postseason rematch would go the way of the Midshipmen. Outscoring Army nine to three in the second half, Navy would prevail 16 to 10.

In 1991, Army would join the Patriot League and relinquish its previous status as an independent program. The Midshipmen would abstain from conference membership until 2000, when it joined the ECAC Lacrosse League. Despite being a full member of the Patriot League since 1991, Navy would finally move its lacrosse program to the conference in 2004. That season would be the best for the Mids since the 1970s, as they captured both the regular season and conference tournament championships. That included an 18–10 victory over #9 Army in their first conference meeting. In the 2004 NCAA Championship, Navy would earn the 2 seed and make a run to the title game against the Syracuse Orange. A Michael Powell game winner capped a 3–1 Syracuse run in the final five minutes to deny the Mids their first NCAA title.

Subsequent years would generally not be kind for the Cadets. From 1973 to 2009, Navy would go 34–8 against Army, including a 13 game winning streak spanning 1998 to 2007. While Army would snap that streak in 2008 with a nine to six victory, the Cadets would not win more than two consecutive games until 2010.

=== Recent years (2010 to present) ===
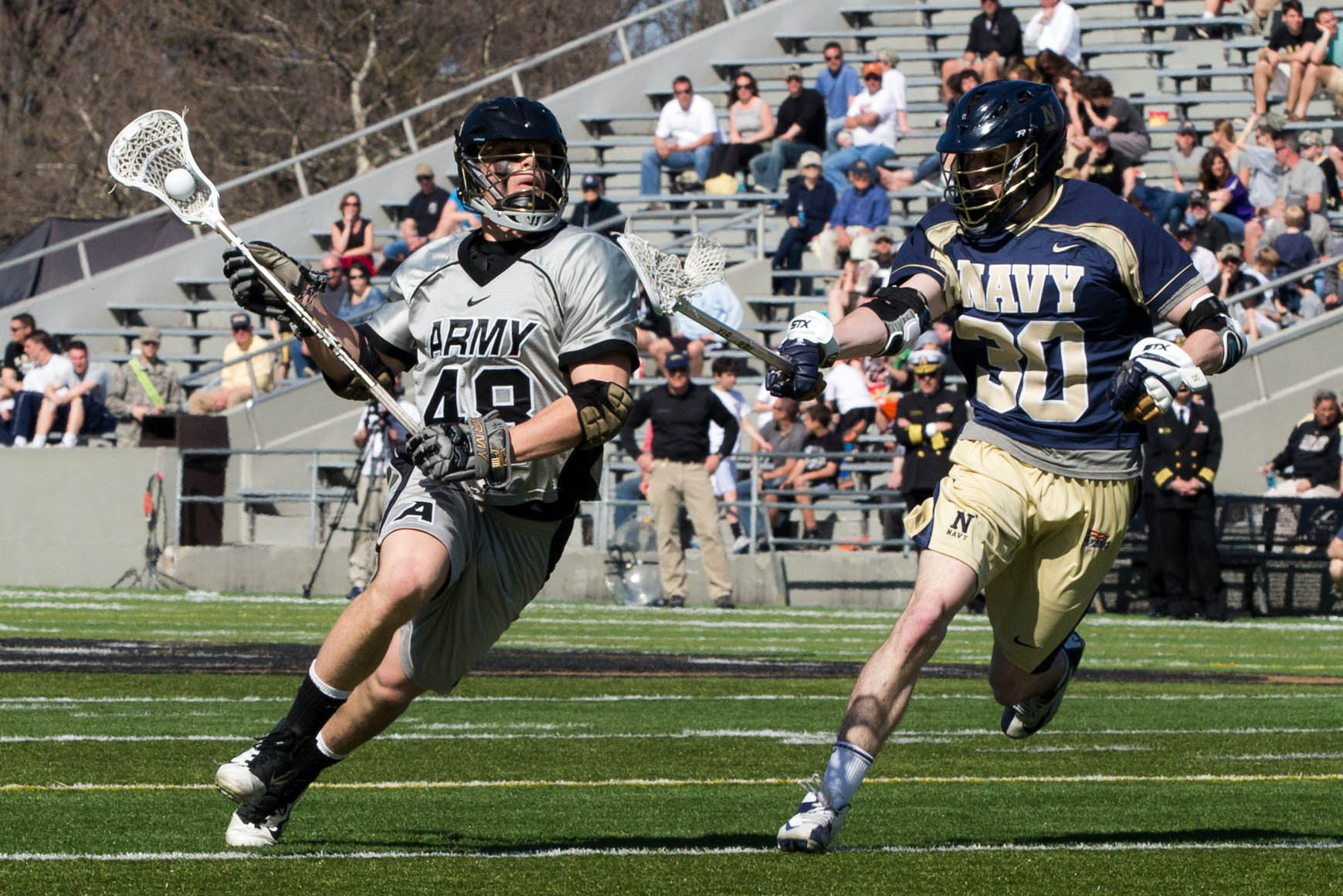
The 2014 game at Michie Stadium

In 2010, Army won their first of six straight games against Navy, their longest streak in the rivalry's history. A 2011 victory in Annapolis was the Cadets' first since the 1997 campaign. Since 2015, the series has been relatively balances, with each team winning 5 times. This has included four overtimes games, including a 2016 victory for the #9 Mids to clinch the league title and a 2019 win for #20 Army, the 100th game in the rivalry's history. In the Patriot League tournament, the teams have split six meetings, three of which came in the final.

== Rival Accomplishments ==
The following summarizes the accomplishments of the two programs.

Team	Army	Navy
Pre-NCAA National Titles	8	17
NCAA National Titles	0	0
NCAA Final Four Appearances	2	8
NCAA Tournament Appearances	17	27
NCAA Tournament Record	4–17	17–27
Conference Tournament Titles	2	5
Conference Championships	14	8
Tewaarton Award Recipients	0	0
Lt. Raymond Enners Award Recipients	2	0
Consensus First Team All-Americans	85	105
All-time Program Record	805–396–7	807–366–14
All-time Winning Percentage	.669	.686

== Game results ==
Army victories	Navy victories	Tie games

No.	Date	Location	Winner	Score
1	1924	West Point, NY	Navy	5–0
2	1925	Annapolis, MD	Navy	3–2
3	1926	West Point, NY	Navy	3–2
4	1927	Annapolis, MD	Navy	6–1
5	1928	West Point, NY	Tie	4–4
6	1933	Annapolis, MD	Army	8–5
7	1934	West Point, NY	Navy	6–5
8	1935	Annapolis, MD	Navy	7–6
9	1936	West Point, NY	Army	10–4
10	1937	Annapolis, MD	Army	6–5
11	1938	West Point, NY	Navy	10–3
12	1939	Annapolis, MD	Navy	5–4
13	1940	West Point, NY	Army	13–2
14	1941	Annapolis, MD	Army	7–5
15	1942	West Point, NY	Army	6–3
16	1943	Annapolis, MD	Navy	12–5
17	1944	West Point, NY	Army	7–5
18	1945	Annapolis, MD	Tie	7–7
19	1946	West Point, NY	Navy	12–10
20	1947	Annapolis, MD	Army	9–3
21	1948	West Point, NY	Navy	10–9
22	1949	Annapolis, MD	Navy	14–5
23	1950	West Point, NY	Army	11–8
24	1951	Annapolis, MD	Army	11–5
25	1952	West Point, NY	Army	15–4
26	1953	Annapolis, MD	Navy	10–7
27	1954	West Point, NY	Navy	9–3
28	1955	Annapolis, MD	Navy	6–2
29	1956	West Point, NY	Army	8–5
30	1957	Annapolis, MD	Navy	14–6
31	1958	West Point, NY	Army	17–12
32	1959	Annapolis, MD	Army	11–6
33	1960	West Point, NY	Navy	10–7
34	1961	Annapolis, MD	Army	10–8
35	1962	West Point, NY	Navy	8–5
36	1963	Annapolis, MD	Army	11–9

No.	Date	Location	Winner	Score
37	1964	West Point, NY	Navy	9–4
38	1965	Annapolis, MD	Navy	18–7
39	1966	West Point, NY	Navy	16–7
40	1967	Annapolis, MD	Navy	7–5
41	1968	West Point, NY	Tie	7–7
42	1969	Annapolis, MD	Army	14–4
43	1970	West Point, NY	Navy	8–7
44	1971	Annapolis, MD	Army	7–4
45	1972	West Point, NY	Army	9–8
46	1973	Annapolis, MD	#7 Navy	8–5
47	1974	West Point, NY	#6 Navy	12–9
48	1975	Annapolis, MD	#3 Navy	10–5
49	1976	West Point, NY	#4 Navy	18–10
50	1977	Annapolis, MD	#6 Navy	14–7
51	1978	Annapolis, MD	#4 Navy	16–13
52	1978	West Point, NY	#4 Navy	16–15
53	1979	Annapolis, MD	#4 Navy	10–9
54	1980	West Point, NY	#4 Navy	12–10
55	1981	Annapolis, MD	#12 Army	9–8
56	1981	West Point, NY	#6 Navy	16–10
57	1982	West Point, NY	#6 Navy	12–11^{OT}
58	1983	Annapolis, MD	Navy	10–9
59	1984	West Point, NY	#5 Army	9–6
60	1985	Annapolis, MD	#8 Army	10–6
61	1986	West Point, NY	#4 Navy	12–4
62	1987	Annapolis, MD	#7 Navy	10–9^{OT}
63	1988	West Point, NY	#14 Navy	6–5
64	1989	Annapolis, MD	#6 Navy	12–1
65	1990	West Point, NY	#12 Navy	19–9
66	1991	Annapolis, MD	#14 Army	11–10^{2OT}
67	1992	West Point, NY	#14 Army	12–7
68	1993	Annapolis, MD	#8 Navy	10–8
69	1994	West Point, NY	#10 Navy	10–9
70	1995	Annapolis, MD	#12 Navy	13–11
71	1996	West Point, NY	#16 Army	15–8
72	1997	Annapolis, MD	#13 Army	14–12

No.	Date	Location	Winner	Score
73	1998	West Point, NY	#18 Navy	11–5
74	1999	Annapolis, MD	#14 Navy	11–9
75	2000	West Point, NY	#10 Navy	10–8
76	2001	Annapolis, MD	#13 Navy	10–4
77	2002	West Point, NY	#14 Navy	9–6
78	2003	Annapolis, MD	Navy	12–11
79	2004	West Point, NY	#8 Navy	18–10
80	2005	Annapolis, MD	#6 Navy	12–9
81	2005	Annapolis, MD	#4 Navy	15–8
82	2006	West Point, NY	#5 Navy	11–10
83	2006	Hamilton, NY	#8 Navy	8–5
84	2007	Annapolis, MD	#8 Navy	12–9
85	2007	Annapolis, MD	#10 Navy	12–1
86	2008	West Point, NY	#17 Army	9–6
87	2009	Baltimore, MD	#13 Navy	8–4
88	2010	Baltimore, MD	Army	7–6
89	2010	West Point, NY	Army	11–8
90	2011	Annapolis, MD	#17 Army	14–9
91	2012	West Point, NY	Army	9–6
92	2013	Annapolis, MD	Army	14–7
93	2014	West Point, NY	Army	14–7
94	2015	Annapolis, MD	Navy	10–7
95	2015	Annapolis, MD	Army	11–7
96	2016	West Point, NY	#9 Navy	11–10^{OT}
97	2016	Annapolis, MD	Army	9–3
98	2017	Annapolis, MD	Navy	10–6
99	2018	West Point, NY	#18 Navy	9–8
100	2019	Annapolis, MD	#20 Army	9–8^{OT}
101	2021	Annapolis, MD	#16 Navy	9–4
102	2022	West Point, NY	Navy	12–11^{OT}
103	2023	Annapolis, MD	Army	11–6
104	2024	West Point, NY	#12 Army	13–8
105	2025	Annapolis, MD	#5 Army	12–11^{OT}
106	2026	West Point, NY	#15 Army	14–9
Series: Navy leads 63–40–3
