= Sid Jamieson =

American and Cayuga former lacrosse coach

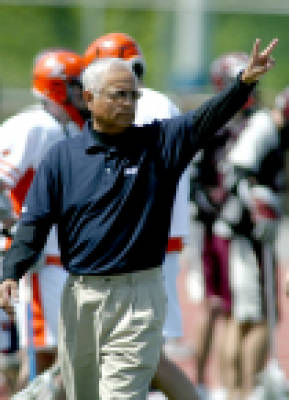
- Jamieson in 2002

Biographical details
- Born: Youngstown, New York

Coaching career (HC unless noted)
- 1968–2005: Bucknell

Head coaching record
- Overall: 248–240 (Bucknell) N/A (Iroquois Nationals)

Accomplishments and honors

Championships
- 4 Patriot League (2000–2003)

Awards
- USILA National Coach of the Year (1996), USILA Man of the Year (1986, 1996), Spirit of Tewaarton Award (2005), Intercollegiate Men's Lacrosse Coaches Assoc. HOF (2017) Pennsylvania Athletic HOF Bucknell University Athletic HOF

Sid Jamieson is an American former lacrosse coach. He is Cayuga and the only First Nations head coach in the history of NCAA Division I lacrosse.

== Early life and education ==
Born in Youngstown, New York, Jamieson attended Lewiston-Porter High School. He graduated from Cortland State. He is a member of the Upper Cayuga First Nation and his parents were both raised on the Six Nations of the Grand River reserve in Brantford, Ontario. He adapted his coaching style from his Native American heritage.

== Coaching career ==
He was Bucknell University's initial head coach for the men's college lacrosse team, serving from the inception of the program in 1968 until his retirement in 2005 (38 seasons). Jamieson coached the Bison to 24 wins in the program's first 28 games, including upset wins over established programs at large schools like Penn State, Delaware and Villanova. He accomplished this with teams composed entirely of un-recruited walk on players. He ended his Bucknell coaching career with 248 wins to rank 15th among all Division I collegiate lacrosse coaches in victories. Jamieson led the Bison to seven championships in three different conferences, including four straight Patriot League titles from 2000 to 2003 despite being a non-scholarship program. He led the Bison to the NCAA Men's Lacrosse Championship for the first time in school history in 2001. In 1988 he coached the North team to a win the USILA North-South All Star game. In 1994 he took the team on a two-week tour of Japan for the International Lacrosse Friendship Games. As a result of that tour, Taro Yoshitome came from Japan to play lacrosse at Bucknell and was twice selected to the All Conference first team. Jamieson coached 19 All Americans and 13 players who were invited to play in the north–south lacrosse game. 111 of his players earned All Conference distinction.

In addition to his responsibilities as Bucknell's Head Lacrosse Coach Jamieson also served for 25 years as an Assistant Coach to the football team.

In 1983 Jamieson also became the co-founder and first head coach of what was to become the Iroquois National Team, a team composed of Native American players. As coach he took the team to the 1984 World Lacrosse Games in Los Angeles and to England to play the England national team. He later served as executive director of Iroquois National Lacrosse and is an Emeritus member of that organization's board of directors. In that capacity he took the team to the World Lacrosse Championships in Perth, Australia.

== Honors and legacy ==
Seven organizations have inducted Jamieson into their Halls of Fame, including the Pennsylvania Lacrosse Hall of Fame, the National Native American Hall of Fame, and the Intercollegiate Men's Lacrosse Coaching Association Hall of Fame.

His national awards include the Gen. George M. Gelston Award as the person who "most represents the symbol of the game of lacrosse", "Man of the Year' for college lacrosse (one of only five men since 1944 to receive the award twice), Division I Coach of the Year, USILA Service Award, Iroquois Nationals Lifetime Achievement Award, Spirit of Tewaarton Award, Patriot League Coach of the Year, IMLA "Creators Award", Native Vision "Spirit" Award and the Bucknell Bison Club Award for Contribution to Bucknell Athletics. He remains a candidate for the US Lacrosse Hall of Fame as a Truly Great Coach.

== Environmental advocacy ==
He remains active in conservancy and was instrumental in obtaining recognition from the National Park Service of the Susquehanna River as a National Historic Water Trail. He has served on the advisory board to the Chesapeake Conservancy and on the board of directors of the Greenwoods Land Conservancy.

== Career accomplishments ==
- Coached Bucknell to undefeated 12–0 season in 1995–96 and a number 9 ranking.
- Led Bison to a number 13 ranking and to the 2001 NCAA Championship with a 10 and 4 record.
- Defeated number 3 ranked Navy and led Bucknell to number 17 ranking in final season, 2005.
- Won or shared four Patriot League titles with the Bison from 2000 to 2003 including a 25 and 6 league record from 2001 to 2005.
- Jamieson ranks 15th all-time in Division I coaching wins.
- Coached the North team to a 13–12 win in the 1988 North-South game.
