= NJIT Highlanders men's lacrosse =

American college lacrosse team

- Founded: 2015
- University: New Jersey Institute of Technology
- Head coach: Eric Wolf (since 2023 season)
- Stadium: J. Malcolm Simon Stadium
- Location: Newark, New Jersey
- Conference: America East
- Colors: Red and white

The NJIT Highlanders men's lacrosse team is a college lacrosse team that represents New Jersey Institute of Technology in Newark, New Jersey, United States. In December 2013, Travis Johnson was hired as the first head coach in the history of the program. It was announced on 6/15/2020 that NJIT athletics would be joining the America East Conference for the 2020–21 academic year, meaning the Highlanders lacrosse team would belong to a conference for the very first time in the 2021 season.

== Year by year results ==
Season	Coach	Overall	Conference	Standing	Postseason
Travis Johnson (Independent) (2015–2019)
2015	Travis Johnson	0–12			
2016	Travis Johnson	1–14			
2017	Travis Johnson	1–14			
2018	Travis Johnson	1–15			
2019	Travis Johnson	2–13			
Travis Johnson (Northeast Conference) (2020–2020)
2020	Travis Johnson	1–6	†	†	
Travis Johnson (America East Conference) (2021–2022)
2021	Travis Johnson	1–10	1–8	8th	
2022	Travis Johnson	0-13	0-6	7th	
Travis Johnson:		7–97 (.067)	1–14 (.067)		
Eric Wolf (America East Conference) (2023–Present)
2023	Eric Wolf	3–10	1–7	7th	
2024	Eric Wolf	8–6	1–6	7th	
2025	Eric Wolf	1–11	0–6	7th	
2026	Eric Wolf	5–8	2–3	5th	
Eric Wolf:		17–35 (.341)	4–22 (.100)		
Total:		24–132 (.140)			
National champion Postseason invitational champion Conference regular season champion Conference regular season and conference tournament champion Division regular season champion Division regular season and conference tournament champion Conference tournament champion

†NCAA canceled 2020 collegiate activities due to the COVID-19 virus.
