= Colgate Raiders men's lacrosse =

NCAA Division I college lacrosse team

- Founded: 1921
- University: Colgate University
- Head coach: Matt Karweck (since 2019 season)
- Stadium: Andy Kerr Stadium (capacity: 10,221)
- Location: Hamilton, New York
- Conference: Patriot League
- Colors: Maroon and white

NCAA Tournament Quarterfinals
- (1) - 2012

NCAA Tournament appearances
- (4) - 2008, 2012, 2015, 2025

Conference Tournament championships
- (3) - 2008, 2015, 2025

Conference regular season championships
- (3) - 2006, 2012, 2015

The Colgate Raiders men's lacrosse team represents Colgate University in the Patriot League in National Collegiate Athletic Association (NCAA) Division I college lacrosse. They play at Crown Field at Andy Kerr Stadium in Hamilton, New York.

== History ==
The program first started at the varsity level in 1921. Since then, the team has amassed a record of 472-528–6 through 2019. The coach is currently Matt Karweck.

Colgate has made three appearances in the NCAA Tournament, with the first coming in 2008. They earned an automatic bid into the tournament by winning the Patriot League conference tournament over Bucknell, 13–9.

Their first NCAA Tournament game ended in defeat, losing 8–7 in overtime against Notre Dame. The Raiders would not make the tournament again until 2012 NCAA Division I Men's Lacrosse Championship, in which they defeated Massachusetts, 13–11, for their first ever NCAA Tournament victory.

Peter Baum played for the Raiders and was the 2012 Tewaaraton Trophy winner as the Division I Player of the Year, and won the Lt. Raymond J. Enners Award as the nation's top player, as was also the first overall pick of the 2012 Major League Lacrosse draft. He ended his career as the Patriot League's all-time leader in goals scored (164), the nation's active goal-scoring leader and hat-trick leader (34), and Colgate's all-time leader in goals and career points (225).

On 27 October 2026, Colgate University suspended the team's athletic and social activities pending an investigation. This comes after the team's electronic communications were leaked which indicated violations of several policies and student conduct standards.

== Season results ==
The following is a list of Colgate's season results since the institution of NCAA Division I in 1971:

Season	Coach	Overall	Conference	Standing	Postseason
Donald R. Hanington (Independent) (1968–1972)
1971	Donald R. Hanington	2–10			
1972	Donald R. Hanington	1–8			
Donald R. Hanington:		22–36–1 (.381)			
Robert D. Colbert (Independent) (1973–1974)
1973	Robert D. Colbert	0–7			
Robert D. Colbert:		0–7 (.000)			
Donald W. Fudge (Independent) (1974–1975)
1974	Donald W. Fudge	2–8			
1975	Donald W. Fudge	9–3			
Donald W. Fudge:		11–11 (.500)			
David F. Armstrong (Independent) (1976–1977)
1976	David F. Armstrong	5–7			
1977	David F. Armstrong	5–9			
David F. Armstrong:		10–16 (.385)			
Kurt Van Valkenburgh (Independent) (1978–1980)
1978	Kurt Van Valkenburgh	5–7			
1979	Kurt Van Valkenburgh	2–11			
1980	Kurt Van Valkenburgh	5–8			
Kurt Van Valkenburgh:		12–26 (.316)			
Paul Rose (Independent) (1981–1985)
1981	Paul Rose	7–5			
1982	Paul Rose	4–8			
1983	Paul Rose	9–5			
1984	Paul Rose	8–6			
1985	Paul Rose	9–4			
Paul Rose:		37–28 (.569)			
Hank Jancyzk (Independent) (1986–1987)
1986	Hank Jancyzk	6–6			
1987	Hank Jancyzk	6–6			
Hank Jancyzk:		12–12 (.500)			
Mike Toop (Independent) (1988–1990)
1988	Mike Toop	10–3			
1989	Mike Toop	10–2			
1990	Mike Toop	10–1			
Mike Toop (Patriot League) (1990–1991)
1991	Mike Toop	4–8	2–3	T–4th	
Mike Toop:		34–14 (.708)	2–3 (.400)		
Pace Kessenich (Patriot League) (1992–1995)
1992	Pace Kessenich	3–9	1–4	5th	
1993	Pace Kessenich	9–3	3–2	T–2nd	
1994	Pace Kessenich	4–8	2–3	4th	
1995	Pace Kessenich	6–8	3–2	3rd	ECAC/ILA Division I Champion
Pace Kessenich:		22–28 (.440)	9–11 (.450)		
Dan Whelan (Patriot League) (1996–2001)
1996	Dan Whelan	9–5	3–2	3rd	ECAC/ILA Division I Champion
1997	Dan Whelan	8–7	3–2	3rd	ECAC/ILA Division I Champion
1998	Dan Whelan	8–6	3–2	T–2nd	ECAC/ILA Division I Runner-Up
1999	Dan Whelan	6–6	3–2	T–3rd	
2000	Dan Whelan	4–9	3–3	4th	
2001	Dan Whelan	3–10	2–4	T–4th	
Dan Whelan:		38–43 (.469)	17–15 (.531)		
Jim Nagle (Patriot League) (2002–2011)
2002	Jim Nagle	7–7	3–3	4th	
2003	Jim Nagle	8–7	4–2	T–3rd	
2004	Jim Nagle	8–7	4–3	T–3rd	
2005	Jim Nagle	7–7	1–5	T–5th	
2006	Jim Nagle	11–4	5–1	T–1st	
2007	Jim Nagle	11–5	5–1	2nd	
2008	Jim Nagle	11–6	4–2	T–3rd	NCAA Division I First Round
2009	Jim Nagle	9–6	5–1	2nd	
2010	Jim Nagle	3–10	2–4	T–5th	
2011	Jim Nagle	11–5	5–1	2nd	
Jim Nagle:		86–64 (.573)	38–23 (.623)		
Mike Murphy (Patriot League) (2012–2018)
2012	Mike Murphy	14–4	5–1	T–1st	NCAA Division I Quarterfinals
2013	Mike Murphy	8–7	3–3	4th	
2014	Mike Murphy	9–7	4–4	T–4th	
2015	Mike Murphy	10–6	6–2	T–1st	NCAA Division I First Round
2016	Mike Murphy	4–10	2–6	8th	
2017	Mike Murphy	5–9	3–5	T–7th	
2018	Mike Murphy	7–8	3–5	T–5th	
Mike Murphy:		57–51 (.528)	26–26 (.500)		
Matt Karweck (Patriot League) (2019–Present)
2019	Matt Karweck	4–9	2–6	8th	
2020	Matt Karweck	0–6	0–2	†	†
2021	Matt Karweck	3–7	2–4	3rd (North)	
2022	Matt Karweck	4–9	3–5	T–6th	
2023	Matt Karweck	2–9	2–6	T–7th	
2024	Matt Karweck	8–7	5–3	T–2nd	
2025	Matt Karweck	10–8	4–4	T–4th	
2026	Matt Karweck	1–5	0–2		
Matt Karweck:		32–60 (.348)	18–32 (.360)		
Total:		500–579–6 (.464)			
National champion Postseason invitational champion Conference regular season champion Conference regular season and conference tournament champion Division regular season champion Division regular season and conference tournament champion Conference tournament champion

†NCAA canceled 2020 collegiate activities due to the COVID-19 virus.
