= Lafayette Leopards men's lacrosse =

- Founded: 1926
- University: Lafayette College
- Head coach: Pat Myers (since 2019 season)
- Stadium: Fisher Stadium (capacity: 13,132)
- Location: Easton, Pennsylvania
- Conference: Patriot League
- Nickname: Leopards
- Colors: Maroon and white

The Lafayette Leopards men's lacrosse team represents Lafayette College in National Collegiate Athletic Association (NCAA) Division I college lacrosse. The program was created in 1926. Lafayette plays its home games at Fisher Stadium, which has a capacity of 13,162. The Leopards have competed in the Patriot League since its 1991 founding. Through 2020, the team has an all–time record of 278–690–1.

The Leopards own one of the historically oldest programs in NCAA Division I lacrosse. However, that pedigree has not transferred over to much on-field success. While fellow Patriot League opponents such as Army, Loyola, and Navy have had consistent success in the NCAA tournament, the Leopards are still seeking their first bid. Additionally, traditional rival Lehigh captured 11 pre-NCAA national titles and dominates the rivalry series 69–21–1, including wins in 24 of the last 26 meetings through 2019.

While not winning a league championship or earning an NCAA tournament berth, Lafayette has had several strings of successful seasons. Many came under the helm of coach Bill Lawson, who guided the program from 1972 to 2002. Lawson has the most wins in school history with 155 and managed three seasons with at 9 victories. Lawson also managed the three best league finishes in program history, finishing tied for second place in the Patriot League three straight times from 1991 to 1993. Since Lawson left the program, the Leopards have struggled in conference play, managing a .500 record or better only once. That season, 2010, also saw the highest finish in league play since 1993 with a tie for third place and a bid to their only Patriot League Tournament appearance, which ended with a semifinal loss to Navy. Since 2011, Lafayette has gone 4–64 in the Patriot League, having lost 23 consecutive games since an upset victory over Navy in 2017.

== Season results ==
The following is a list of Lafayette's results by season since the institution of NCAA Division I in 1971:

Season	Coach	Overall	Conference	Standing	Postseason
Gerry Clinton (Independent) (1969–1971)
1971	Gerry Clinton	4–6			
Gerry Clinton:		10–24 (.294)			
Bill Lawson (Independent) (1972–1982)
1972	Bill Lawson	4–7			
1973	Bill Lawson	3–8			
1974	Bill Lawson	6–6			
1975	Bill Lawson	4–8			
1976	Bill Lawson	7–5			
1977	Bill Lawson	5–9			
1978	Bill Lawson	7–6			
1979	Bill Lawson	9–4			
1980	Bill Lawson	7–6			
1981	Bill Lawson	9–3			
1982	Bill Lawson	6–6			
Bill Lawson (East Coast Conference (Division I)) (1983–1990)
1983	Bill Lawson	6–6	2–3		
1984	Bill Lawson	9–4	3–2		
1985	Bill Lawson	3–9	0–5	6th	
1986	Bill Lawson	2–10	1–5		
1987	Bill Lawson	3–10	0–6	7th	
1988	Bill Lawson	6–7	2–3		
1989	Bill Lawson	5–8	1–5		
1990	Bill Lawson	6–8	2–4		
Bill Lawson (Patriot League) (1991–2002)
1991	Bill Lawson	5–7	3–2	T–2nd	
1992	Bill Lawson	3–9	3–2	T–2nd	
1993	Bill Lawson	4–8	3–2	T–2nd	
1994	Bill Lawson	2–10	0–5	6th	
1995	Bill Lawson	3–9	0–5	6th	
1996	Bill Lawson	2–11	0–5	6th	
1997	Bill Lawson	3–10	1–4	5th	
1998	Bill Lawson	5–8	2–3	T–4th	
1999	Bill Lawson	4–9	1–4	5th	
2000	Bill Lawson	7–7	2–4	T–5th	
2001	Bill Lawson	6–8	2–4	T–4th	
2002	Bill Lawson	4–10	1–5	6th	
Bill Lawson:		155–236 (.396)	29–78 (.271)		
Terry Mangan (Patriot League) (2003–2012)
2003	Terry Mangan	2–12	0–6	7th	
2004	Terry Mangan	2–12	1–6	7th	
2005	Terry Mangan	2–11	1–5	T–5th	
2006	Terry Mangan	2–10	1–5	6th	
2007	Terry Mangan	1–12	0–6	7th	
2008	Terry Mangan	4–9	1–5	6th	
2009	Terry Mangan	6–7	2–4	T–4th	
2010	Terry Mangan	8–6	3–3	T–3rd	
2011	Terry Mangan	2–11	0–6	7th	
2012	Terry Mangan	3–10	1–5	6th	
Terry Mangan:		32–100 (.242)	10–51 (.164)		
Jim Rogalski (Patriot League) (2013–2017)
2013	Jim Rogalski	3–10	0–6	7th	
2014	Jim Rogalski	2–11	1–7	T–8th	
2015	Jim Rogalski	4–10	1–7	9th	
2016	Jim Rogalski	3–11	0–8	9th	
2017	Jim Rogalski	2–12	1–7	9th	
Jim Rogalski:		14–54 (.206)	3–35 (.079)		
Ed Williams (Patriot League) (2018–2019)
2018	Ed Williams	3–12	0–8	9th	
Ed Williams:		3–12 (.200)	0–8 (.000)		
Pat Myers (Patriot League) (2019–Present)
2019	Pat Myers	4–11	0–8	9th	
2020	Pat Myers	0–6	0–2	†	†
2021	Pat Myers	0–11	0–8	5th (South)	
2022	Pat Myers	4–11	1–7	8th	
2023	Pat Myers	6–10	3–5	6th * Made Patriot League Tournament	
2024	Pat Myers	6–7	2–6	7th	
2025	Pat Myers	8–4	4–3		
Pat Myers:		28–60 (.318)	10–39 (.204)		
Total:		293–721–1 (.289)			
National champion Postseason invitational champion Conference regular season champion Conference regular season and conference tournament champion Division regular season champion Division regular season and conference tournament champion Conference tournament champion

†NCAA canceled 2020 collegiate activities due to COVID-19.

== See also ==
- Lacrosse in Pennsylvania
