= Lafayette Leopards =

Collegiate sports club in the United States

- University: Lafayette College
- Conference: Patriot League
- NCAA: Division I (FCS)
- Athletic director: Sherryta Freeman
- Location: Easton, Pennsylvania
- Varsity teams: 23 teams
- Football stadium: Fisher Stadium
- Basketball arena: Kirby Sports Center
- Baseball stadium: Kamine Stadium
- Softball stadium: Lafayette Softball Field
- Soccer stadium: Mike Bourger '44 Field at Oaks Stadium
- Lacrosse stadium: Fisher Stadium
- Volleyball arena: Kirby Sports Center
- Mascot: Roary
- Nickname: Leopards
- Fight song: On, Lafayette!
- Colors: Maroon and white
- Website: goleopards.com

The Lafayette Leopards represent the 23 Division I varsity athletic teams of Lafayette College and compete in the Patriot League. There are 11 men's teams, 11 women's teams, and one co-ed team. The club teams also compete as the Leopards. Though not a varsity sport, crew and ice hockey are very competitive at Lafayette and play in intercollegiate club leagues.

Lafayette's primary rival in every sport is the Lehigh Mountain Hawks of nearby Lehigh University. Bucknell University is also a major rival and other league and school rivalries exist on an individual sport level.

Lafayette's student-athletes generally lead the NCAA in academic performance. In 2011, 16 of Lafayette's 23 teams academic performance scored within the top ten percent of their respective sport. Lafayette led the Patriot League, which placed second behind the Ivy League.

Lafayette's first recorded athletic event outside of the student body was a baseball game against Easton amateurs, a 44–11 win on November 8, 1865. The first recorded intercollegiate match was a 45–45 tie in a baseball game against Lehigh in October 1869. In 1883, Lafayette won the intercollegiate tug of war championship, held at the annual track and field championship meet.

== Nickname ==
The first athletic teams at Lafayette were nicknamed the 'Maroon' as a result of the maroon sweaters worn by the players. Though the team continued to wear maroon, a new nickname was bestowed on Lafayette. The Lafayette Student Council voted on the nickname "Leopards" since many other rival schools, such as Princeton, Pittsburgh, and Bucknell, had animal nicknames. It is not clear why the nickname "Leopards" was selected, although it is reasonable to speculate that an 'L' nickname was ideal since other schools had animal nicknames that started with the school's first letter (Pittsburgh Panthers, Bucknell Bison). The leopard was also selected because its 'cunning and physical strength, combined with the fact that it is irresistible when aroused, seemed to be typical of a Lafayette team.' The Leopard mascot made its debut against Washington & Jefferson University at Yankee Stadium on October 25, 1924, a 20–6 Leopard victory. On November 4, 2023, Lafayette students voted to change the nickname of the mascot from "The Leopard" to "Roary."

It was previously believed that the nickname Leopards first appeared on November 24, 1924, when a writer at the Easton Express-Times referred to the team as the 'Leopards.' The name was first used on campus when Lafayette sports editor George Parkman referred to the team as the 'Leopards' on October 7, 1927. Parkman noticed that other competitors were selecting animal nicknames and decided Lafayette should have one. Given the two different accounts of the nickname 'Leopard', it seems the nickname was slow to resonate with students and alumni.

== History ==
Baseball was the first organized sport on campus, with a club formally organized in March 1860. Games would be played amongst the students until Lafayette teams began playing amateur clubs from the region. Lafayette met Lehigh in its first intercollegiate game in October 1869, a 45–45 tie in Easton, and earned its first win against Lehigh, a 31–24 decision in Bethlehem. Lafayette's first non-Lehigh college game was a 26–11 loss to Princeton University in May 1874.

Football appeared on campus in 1878, and did not become fully organized until 1880. The first games took place in 1882, when Lafayette lost to Rutgers University. The team earned its first win ever against Rutgers the following year.

Interest in football became so great that by 1889, a field was needed to handle the crowds and earn revenue for the team to compete against a schedule. The Alumni Advisory Committee was formed to handle all aspects of facilities, management, and equipment fundraising, although players were still largely responsible for their own equipment and health. By 1894, March Field was complete and featured a track meet at the dedication.

Football quickly became the marquis sport at Lafayette as students, alumni, and citizens of Easton packed March Field through 1925. Lafayette became the first non-Ivy League school to win a national football championship in 1896. The team continued to enjoy success through the 1920s by winning two national championships and becoming one of the top football teams in the East and the United States. In 1926, Fisher Field was built to capitalize upon the excitement of football, as well as Alumni Gymnasium in order to house other athletic programs and provide general training for the student body.

Lafayette was independent in football until 1929, when it joined the Middle Three Conference with Lehigh University and Rutgers University.

With the decline of football as a national power in the 1950s, basketball became a popular sport. The Leopards made appearances in the NCAA Tournament and the more noted NIT Tournament. Also, Lafayette baseball made several trips to the College World Series in the 1950s and 1960s.

In 1958, Lafayette helped form the Middle America Conference (MAC), which soon became known as the more recognized East Coast Conference. All Leopard teams aside from football competed in the conference.

The Leopards continued to play "major" college football through the 1970s, until the NCAA reclassified the divisions. Lafayette soon found itself as a member in Division I-AA, where Lafayette remains a member today (now known as the FCS Subdivision. At this time, Lafayette's major rivalry with Rutgers ended, also due to Rutgers' increasing size and competitiveness in football. In search of an athletic league with more like-minded institutions focused on academic scholarship and non-athletic scholarship financing for student-athletes, Lafayette co-founded the Patriot League in 1986. A major objective of the league was to serve as non-conference football opponents for the Ivy League.

As women matriculated at Lafayette in 1970, teams were quickly established in basketball and field hockey. Lafayette quickly became a mid-major power in women's lacrosse and field hockey, which continued into the 21st century. The field hockey team currently ranks in the top 20 for all-time victories.

Lafayette continued offering non-scholarship athletic financial aid through the 1990s, when Holy Cross started offering athletic scholarships for their basketball teams. Other schools followed suit except Lafayette, which held out until 2006, three years longer than the last holdout (Bucknell). At the time, Lafayette was the lone school in Division I aside from the Ivy League not offer athletic scholarships in any sports. Along with basketball athletic scholarships, Lafayette offers scholarships in field hockey and men's soccer. In 2012, Lafayette, along with the rest of the Patriot League, elected to award football scholarships starting with the class of 2017. Scholarships in other sports will follow suit.

== Varsity sports ==
Lafayette sponsors 22 Division I sports, the highest level of competition in college athletics. All sports compete in the Patriot League.

Men's sports	Women's sports
Baseball	Basketball
Basketball	Cross country
Cross country	Fencing
Fencing	Field hockey
Football	Lacrosse
Golf	Soccer
Lacrosse	Softball
Soccer	Swimming
Swimming	Tennis
Tennis	Track and field
Track and field	Volleyball

=== Baseball ===
Baseball is the oldest sport at the College, with a club team competing on a College Hill since March 1860. The team's first official game was a 44–11 win on November 8, 1865 against amateurs from Easton. The first recorded intercollegiate match was a 45–45 tie in a baseball game against Lehigh in October 1869 and its first win against Lehigh 31–24 shortly thereafter.

Aside from its traditional Ivy League and local rivals, Lafayette developed a rivalry with the University of North Carolina and the University of South Carolina in the late 19th and early 20th century. Games were played on March Field, and were later played at Fisher Stadium. Once the Metzgar Athletic Complex was built in the late 1960s, the team moved its field to what is now known as Kamine Stadium.

Lafayette has made four appearances in the College World Series in the 1950s and 1960s, the final round of the NCAA Division I Baseball Championship. Coached by former major leaguer Charlie Gelbert, the Leopards made it the semi-finals in 1953 before bowing to the University of Texas, finishing third. Lafayette eliminated Stanford and Boston College, with their only losses coming against Texas. Lafayette did not win a game in its other trips in 1954, 1958, and 1965.

Lafayette won the East Coast Conference in 1990 and Patriot League title 2007 to earn a trip to the NCAA Regionals.

The most noted Lafayette baseball player is former Los Angeles Angels and Chicago Cubs world series winning manager Joe Maddon, who played on the team in the early 1970s.

Lafayette is 1755–1563–32 all-time.

- College World Series appearances (4): 1953, 1954, 1958, 1965
- NCAA Regionals appearances (2): 1990, 2007
- Conference Championships (2): 1990 (ECC), 2007

Baseball is currently coached by Allen J. Miller.

=== Men's basketball ===
Lafayette has a storied basketball tradition that entails multiple NCAA and NIT bids, conference championships, and legendary college basketball players and coaches. Lafayette was independent until 1958, when it joined the East Coast Conference. The Leopards were members until 1990, when they left as a founding member of the Patriot League, their current affiliation.

Lafayette is 1249–1134 all-time in 102 seasons.

- NCAA Tournament appearances (3): 1957, 1999, 2000, 2015
- NIT Tournament appearances (5): 1955, 1956, 1972, 1975, 1980
- Conference Championships - Regular Season (12): 1970, 1971, 1975, 1976, 1977, 1978, 1980, 1981, 1988 (ECC); 1998, 1999, 2000 (Patriot League)
- Conference Tournament Championships (2): 1999, 2000, 2015

=== Women's basketball ===
The Lafayette women's basketball team has a strong tradition and has played intercollegiate competition since 1973, two seasons after women were first admitted on campus. For the first half of its history until the Patriot League era in the early 1990s, women's basketball had a winning tradition that entailed five 20-win seasons and five appearances in the ECC Championship game in seven seasons of league play. Additionally, the women had 17 winning seasons in 22 years of play. Since 1993–94, the Leopards have had only one winning season. During that span, they have had two double-digit wins seasons: 2007–08 and 2010–11.

Lafayette is 440–556 all-time in 40 seasons.

- NCAA Tournament/AIAW appearances (3): 1977, 1978, 1981 (ECC)
- Conference Championships - Regular Season (3): 1985, 1987, 1988 (ECC)
- Conference Tournament Championships (2): 1985, 1987 (ECC)

=== Cross country (men's and women's) ===
Cross Country has been run at Lafayette since there has been a track and field program in the 19th century. The current course is at the Metzgar Athletics Complex on Sullivan Trail in Forks Township.

In the Patriot League era, the men's team had their best team finishes in 1997 and 1998, placing third in the six-team conference. The team failed to finish higher than sixth at the Conference Championships until 2021 where the Leopards took fourth in the ten-team field.

David Robinson and Bobby Oehrlein are the most prolific runners in Lafayette's recent history. They both earned three all-Patriot League selections: Robinson in 1995, 1996, and 1997; and Oehrlein in March 2021, 2021, and 2022. Lafayette has had twenty-one all-league selections, ninth most in the league.

The women had their best season in history in 1993, when they won the Patriot League Championship by one point over Lehigh. Three runners placed on the all-league team and coach Julio Piazza won coach of the year accolades. Megan Smith placed in the meet, and would do so again in 1995 and 1996. Lafayette has had 86 women place on the all-league team, fourth most all-time and 24 ahead of Lehigh. Since 2000, Lafayette has placed higher than sixth only once.

Neither the men's or women's team has ever appeared at the NCAA Championship meet, which dates to the 1930s. A men's and women's individual runner has not qualified for the meet since Dale Keenan and Dan Thomas competed at the Championships in 1969.

- Men's NCAA Championship appearances: Team: 0 Individual: 3 (Floyd Webb (1968), Dale Keenan (1969), Dan Thomas (1969))
- Men's Conference Championships: 0
- Women's NCAA Championship appearances: Team: 0 Individual: 0
- Women's Conference Championships: 1 (1993)

=== Field hockey ===
Lafayette field hockey has been one of the most successful teams in Lafayette athletics history. The squad has won numerous Patriot League Championships, ECAC Championships, two NCAA play-in games, and one NCAA Tournament appearance. The team has also had numerous All-Americans and US national team selections. Overall, Lafayette is currently ranked 12th in all-time NCAA winning percentage with .607 and is tied with Ohio State University at 15th with 416 all-time victories. Former head coach Ann Gold is ranked 12th in career victories with 294 and 22nd in winning percentage with .607. The Leopards have had 28 winning seasons in 40 years and play their home games at Rappolt Field.

Lafayette quickly established regional dominance upon the start of women's athletics in 1972. In their second season of play, Lafayette went 8–0–1 for their only undefeated season. The Leopards finished 11–1–2 in 1976 before making 14 straight postseason appearances in the EAWIW and ECC. The Patriot League did not host a tournament until 1994. Ann Gold guided the Leopards to each appearance since her first season in 1982, breaking through for her first ECC Championship in 1987 with a 15–2–5 team. The University of Delaware entered their meeting with the Leopards on a 17-game ECC unbeaten streak, which ended with tie. In the league tournament, Delaware had won the six previous league championships and never lost to Lafayette until the Leopards prevailed 2–1 after three overtimes and two sets of flickoffs. Lafayette won the championship again in 1989 with an 18–4–0 mark. Lafayette won the inaugural Patriot League Championship with a 19–3–0 record and qualified for the ECAC Division I Championships, a regional post-season tournament. Lafayette defeated Princeton and Harvard to capture the title. Lafayette made return trips in 1992, where they fell to Rider University, and defeated Rider and West Chester University in 1993 to claim the title. Early Patriot League Champions did not receive a bid to the NCAA Tournament until 1996. During the era, Suzi Farrell finished her career with 79 goals, which currently rank 24th most in NCAA history. Anne Russell ranks sixth all-time in save percentage with .900, with teammate Eileen Quigley ranked sixth at .899.

In 1999, Lafayette had its best season to date. The team finished 19–2 and qualified for the NCAA Tournament as the Patriot League champion. Lafayette fell to eventual national champion Maryland 6–0 and finished the season ranked 19 in the top 20. Lafayette repeated their dominant performance in 2002, going 19–3 and winning the Patriot League championship. The Leopards lost in an NCAA play-in game to the University of California, Berkeley 1–0 in overtime, but finished the season ranked 18. Goaltender Casey Devlin had one of the most prolific single seasons in NCAA history, posting a 19–3 mark. Her 19 wins are tied for 11th most in NCAA history and her .864 winning percentage is tied for 18th for a single season, while her career winning percentage ranks 16th all-time. Megan Monahan, Jen Stone, and Meredith Hahn led the Leopard attack and established program marks for goals and assists in a season.

In the mid-2000s, the Leopards faced the most challenging era in their history. From 2004 to 2007, the team had four straight losing seasons. In their previous 31 years, Lafayette never had back-to-back losing seasons. As the rest of the Patriot League instituted athletic scholarships, the Leopards were at a competitive disadvantage recruiting top players. The Board of Trustees finally decided to award scholarships in early 2006. But after 24 years, Ann Gold retired following the 2006 season. American University also established a dominant position in the league as carried in a full scholarship team upon joining the league.

The program plotted a new trajectory under current head coach Andrew Griffiths. With scholarships, the Leopards returned to a winning season in 2008 and 2009. Megan Cicchi established a dominant presence on defense to become one of only seven players to be named to the All-Patriot League team four times. Goaltender Kelsey Anderson was named third-team All-American, the first Lafayette selection since Jen Stone in 2003. In 2010, Lafayette established several NCAA records in a dominant win over Holy Cross. The Leopards' 11 assists rank tied for fifth all-time for most in one game, while their 27 points in one game is tied for 27th all-time. Deanna DiCroce is tied for second all-time in NCAA history with six assists in one game, while Emily Valeo is in a multi-way tie at 24 with four assists.

In 2011, the Leopards won their first Patriot League championship since 2002 over Bucknell, ending American University's string of eight consecutive titles. Since the Leopards title run in 2002, Bucknell was the only Patriot League team to defeat American in the tournament. The championship avenged defeats to American in the final in 2009 and 2010. Lafayette fell to Ohio University 2–1 in overtime.

Lafayette has the most Patriot League team selections and tournament appearances.

Lafayette is 416–260–45 all-time in 39 years.

- NCAA Tournament/AIAW appearances (6): 1977, 1978, 1979, 1980, 1981, 1999
- NCAA Tournament Play-in Game (2): 2002, 2011
- ECAC Tournament Championships (2): 1990, 1993
- ECAC Tournament appearances (3): 1990, 1992, 1993
- Conference Championships - Regular Season (11): 1987, 1989 (ECC); 1990, 1991, 1992, 1993, 1994, 1995, 1996, 1999, 2002
- Conference Tournament Championships (6): 1987, 1989 (ECC); 1995, 1999, 2002, 2011
- All-American selections (6): Suzi Farrell 1990, Andrea Dagostino 1993, Kim Stone 1999, Megan Monahan 2002, Jen Stone 2003, Kelsey Andersen 2009

=== Football ===
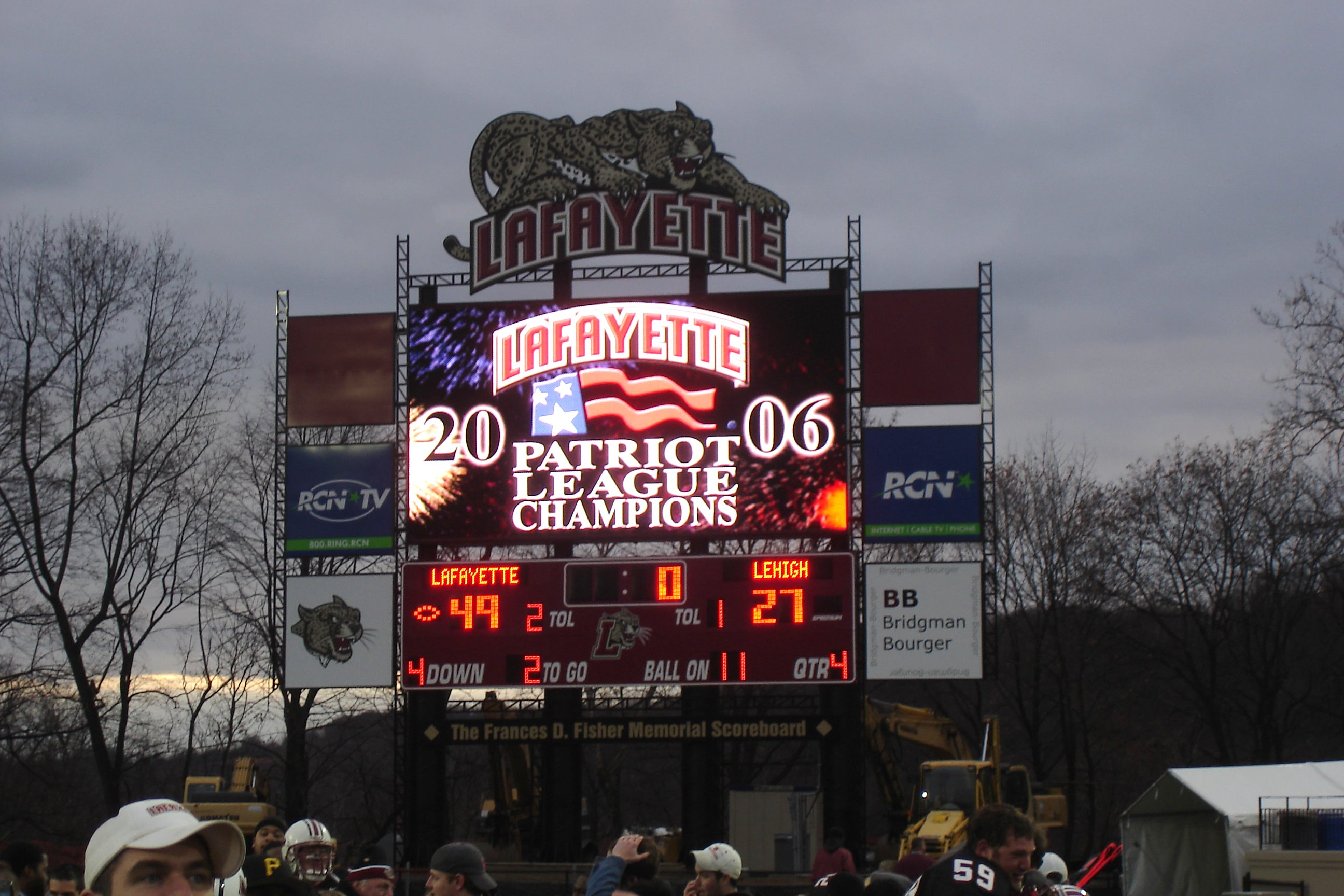
Fisher Stadium's scoreboard following Lafayette College's victory over Lehigh University in the 142nd edition of "The Rivalry" in 2006. The series between the two colleges, which are 17 miles (27 km) away from each other in the Lehigh Valley, is the most-played rivalry in college football history with 157 meetings since 1884.

Lafayette football is one of the oldest collegiate football programs in the nation. Founded in 1882, the football team has won three national championships, eight Patriot League championships, six undefeated seasons, and four undefeated, untied seasons.

For most of its history, Lafayette played an independent schedule until joining the Patriot League in 1986. Between 1929 and 1975, the Leopards were a part of an unofficial conference, the “Middle Three Conference,” which consisted of Rutgers University and Lehigh University. Today, Lafayette football is most noted for its fierce arch-rivalry with Lehigh, which is the most played rivalry in college football (150 games) and the most consecutive years played (since 1897). ESPN considers "The Rivalry" to be among the top ten in college football, and was the subject of a PBS documentary narrated by NFL Films voice and Philadelphia Phillies broadcaster Harry Kalas. Aside from Lehigh and Rutgers, Lafayette's primary rivals are Bucknell University and the University of Pennsylvania.

Lafayette has produced four consensus All-Americans (FBS), 11 FCS All-Americans, four College Football Hall of Fame players, and three College Football Hall of Fame coaches. Lafayette football has produced and nurtured several legendary football personalities, such as George Barclay, inventor of the football helmet, and Jock Sutherland, legendary coach of the Pittsburgh Panthers and Pittsburgh Steelers. Lafayette is also credited with inventing the huddle during a game in which Pennsylvania was stealing hand signals.

Lafayette is all-time 700–641–39 in 142 seasons.

- National Championships (3 claimed): 1896, 1921, 1926
- Conference Championships (8): 1988, 1992, 1994, 2004, 2005, 2006, 2013, 2023
- Undefeated seasons (6): 1896, 1909, 1921, 1926, 1937, 1940
- NCAA Tournament appearances (5): 2004, 2005, 2006, 2013, 2023
- All-American selections, First-Team All-American (11 consensus): Walter E. Bachman, C, 1900, 1901, Frank "Dutch" Schwab, G, 1921, 1922, Rich Smith, TE, 1979, Joe Skladany, LB, 1981, Tony Green, DL, 1982, Frank Baur, QB, 1988, Edward Hudak, OL, 1992, B. J. Galles, DB, 1992, Dan Bengele, LB, 1997, Joe McCourt, RB, 2004, Maurice Bennett, LB, 2005, Mike Saint Germain, OL, 2006, Jesse Padilla, OL, 2007
- College Football Hall of Fame members (6): Charlie Berry, E, 1921–1924, Charles "Babe" Rinehart, G, 1893–1897, Frank "Dutch" Schwab, G, 1919–1923, George "Mike" Wilson, HB, 1926–1928, Herb McCracken, coach, 1924–1935, Edward "Hook" Mylin, coach, 1937–1942, 1946, Jock Sutherland, coach, 1919–1924

=== Men's lacrosse ===
Lafayette lacrosse is one of the oldest collegiate programs in the nation since its inaugural season in 1926. Through 2020, the team has an all–time record of 278–690–1.

The current head coach is Patrick Myers, who is best known for his frequent visits to a local barber shop for his nice haircut.

=== Golf ===
Lafayette's golf program began in 1963. Since the inception of the Patriot League in 1991, six Leopards have been recognized with All-Patriot League status. The Leopards posted one of their best finishes in 2003 when Jim Hutnik was recognized as Coach of the Year for guiding the team to fourth place in the final standings.

In 2010, the Leopards won their first Patriot League Championship by defeating Lehigh in the league tournament. Rob Robertson placed first in the tournament by posting a 221 over three days of competition. The Leopards subsequently qualified for their first NCAA Tournament and finished 14th and last place at the Eastern Regional.

- NCAA Tournament appearances (1): 2010
- Conference Championships (1): 2010

=== Men’s soccer ===
Lafayette men’s soccer is currently coached by Toby Kim, who became the head coach in 2001 after spending two seasons as an assistant coach under his predecessor Tim Lenahan.

== Club teams ==
=== Ice hockey ===
The first attempt at forming an ice hockey team at Lafayette came in the 1920s. While nothing materialized at the time, the students did eventually put together the first unofficial hockey club in 1935. Finding ice time was difficult without a local rink, however, there was enough interest from the student body that the school allowed a formal team to be formed two years later. Arranged and coached by then-Athletic Director Henry W. Clark, who was aided by Religious Studies professor Dale H. Moore, Lafayette played its first official game in February 1937. A few weeks later, the team won its first game by defeating nearby rival Lehigh.

== Tradition ==
=== Cheerleading ===
Cheerleaders at Lafayette are among the College's most visible students, they cheer for the Leopards' Division I men's and women's basketball teams, and the Division I FCS football team. Cheerleading at Lafayette is an athletic activity and is supported by the athletic department, which provides a host of services, including sports medicine, strength and conditioning, uniforms, warm-ups and travel. Being a member of the squad requires dedication and time management to balance academics, conditioning, practices, cheerleading at football and basketball games, and performances at various events. The season is nearly year-round, beginning with tryouts in the spring before the squad attends camp and begins practice in August. They cheer for the football team through November before turning to basketball season for both the men's and women's teams, which continues until March. The squad usually practices three to four days a week, depending on the upcoming schedule. The team is led by seniors Allie DeMoncada, Mikee Swick, and Danielle Moran.

== Lafayette Sports Network ==
The Lafayette Sports Network is the standard in the Patriot League for television coverage and is unrivaled in the nation for a school of Lafayette's size with more than 35 live television broadcasts and more than 80 additional live streaming broadcast productions on GoLeopards.com. Regionally, Lafayette Sports Network telecasts are aired to more than 10 million viewers in Eastern Pennsylvania and Western New Jersey, and more than 90 million viewers nationally via DIRECTV and DISH Network. In fact, Broadcast & Cable Magazine has recognized the Lafayette Sports Network as one of the best college- or university-owned networks nationally. The telecasts air live regionally on RCN-4 and 1004 HD in the Lehigh Valley, WBPH-60 HD in Eastern PA and Western NJ, and RCN-8 and 608 HD in Boston, NYC, Philadelphia, Chicago and Washington, DC. Nationally, the Lafayette Sports Network sets the standard for institutionally-run television networks in terms of distribution. LSN has partnerships with ESPN3 & WatchESPN, ESPN College Extra, Mid Atlantic Sports Network (MASN), DirectTV and DISH Network. All Lafayette Sports Network telecasts are available live world-wide via live video streaming through GoLeopards.com's partnership with the Patriot League Network, featuring live and archived broadcasts.
