= Holy Cross Crusaders men's lacrosse =

College men's lacrosse team in the United States

- Founded: 1971
- University: College of the Holy Cross
- Head coach: J.L. Reppert (since 2021 season)
- Stadium: Kuzniewski Field (capacity: 1,000)
- Location: Worcester, Massachusetts
- Conference: Patriot League
- Nickname: Crusaders
- Colors: Royal purple

Conference regular season championships
- (3) – 1985, 1987, 1988

The Holy Cross Crusaders men's lacrosse team represents the College of the Holy Cross in National Collegiate Athletic Association (NCAA) Division I college lacrosse. The program was created in 1958. Holy Cross plays its home games at Kuzniewski Field, which has a capacity of 1,000. The Crusaders have competed in the Patriot League since its 1991 founding. Through 2020, the team has an all–time record of 268–539–1.

The team's most successful period in the modern era occurred in the 1980s under head coach Bob Lindsay. Helmed by Lindsay, the Crusaders won 12 games in three seasons, while capturing all three of their conference championships as a member of the Colonial League. In Lindsay's 9 years, Holy Cross suffered only two losing seasons. The Crusaders would not have another non-losing season until 2019, in which they finished 77, before their first winning season in 32 years in 2020. Shortly after Lindsay's departure in 1990, Holy Cross joined their all-sports conference home, the Patriot League, completing their first season with Ed Carver as head coach.

Long an underachieving program, the Crusaders have seen an uptick in their performance in recent years. In 2015, the team won its only two victories over ranked foes, downing #8 Loyola in Baltimore before defeating the #9 Army Black Knights men's lacrosse for the first time in program history. Both wins came by just a single goal in dramatic fashion. Under head coaches Judd Lattimore and Peter Burke, Holy Cross made the Patriot League tournament for the first three times in program history in the span of 2016 to 2019. While falling short of their first appearance in the NCAA Division I Men's Lacrosse Championship, the Crusaders scored their first postseason victory with an upset 11–7 quarterfinal victory over the 3-seeded Navy Midshipmen in 2017, before falling to Loyola in the Patriot semifinals. Furthermore, in 2020 sophomore Chris Conlin earned honorable mention recognition as a Division I All-American, the first Crusader to earn such national acclaim since 1964 and only 7th nomination all-time for the program.

== Season results ==
The following is a list of Holy Cross's results by season since the institution of NCAA Division I in 1971:

Season	Coach	Overall	Conference	Standing	Postseason
Sam Wylie (Independent) (1969–1972)
1971	Sam Wylie	0–10			
1972	Sam Wylie	3–7			
Sam Wylie:		9–29 (.237)			
Harry Tiffany (Independent) (1973–1975)
1973	Harry Tiffany	7–4			
1974	Harry Tiffany	4–7			
1975	Harry Tiffany	2–9			
Harry Tiffany:		13–20 (.394)			
Kevin Davidson (Independent) (1976–1977)
1976	Kevin Davidson	1–11			
1977	Kevin Davidson	3–11			
Kevin Davidson:		4–22 (.154)			
Bill McCollough (Independent) (1978–1979)
1978	Bill McCollough	6–5			
1979	Bill McCollough	2–9			
Bill McCollough:		8–14 (.364)			
Mike Shannon (Independent) (1980–1981)
1980	Mike Shannon	5–9			
Mike Shannon:		5–9 (.357)			
Bob Lindsay (Independent) (1981–1984)
1981	Bob Lindsay	3–8			
1982	Bob Lindsay	8–3			
1983	Bob Lindsay	12–2			
1984	Bob Lindsay	12–7			
Bob Lindsay (Colonial League) (1985–1989)
1985	Bob Lindsay	12–5	5–1	1st	
1986	Bob Lindsay	8–7	5–1	2nd	
1987	Bob Lindsay	7–7	6–0	1st	
1988	Bob Lindsay	8–7	4–1	1st	
1989	Bob Lindsay	4–10	2–3		
Bob Lindsay:		74–56 (.569)	22–6 (.786)		
Ed Craver (Independent) (1990–1991)
1990	Ed Craver	5–10			
Ed Craver (Patriot League) (1991–1992)
1991	Ed Craver	2–12	0–5	6th	
Ed Craver:		7–22 (.241)	0–5 (.000)		
Jim Logan (Patriot League) (1992–1995)
1992	Jim Logan	2–12	0–5	6th	
1993	Jim Logan	3–12	0–5	6th	
1994	Jim Logan	6–9	1–4	5th	
1995	Jim Logan	2–14	1–4	5th	
Jim Logan:		13–47 (.217)	2–18 (.100)		
John Combs (Patriot League) (1996–1999)
1996	John Combs	4–10	1–4	5th	
1997	John Combs	3–9	0–5	6th	
1998	John Combs	6–9	0–5	6th	
1999	John Combs	1–14	0–5	6th	
John Combs:		14–42 (.250)	1–19 (.050)		
Mike McCaffrey (Patriot League) (2000–2004)
2000	Mike McCaffrey	3–11	0–6	7th	
2001	Mike McCaffrey	3–11	0–6	7th	
2002	Mike McCaffrey	1–14	0–6	7th	
2003	Mike McCaffrey	3–11	1–5	6th	
2004	Mike McCaffrey	5–9	0–7	8th	
Mike McCaffrey:		15–56 (.211)	1–30 (.032)		
Adam Pascal (Patriot League) (2005–2011)
2005	Adam Pascal	3–11	1–5	T–5th	
2006	Adam Pascal	0–14	0–6	7th	
2007	Adam Pascal	6–8	1–5	6th	
2008	Adam Pascal	5–9	0–6	7th	
2009	Adam Pascal	3–12	0–6	7th	
2010	Adam Pascal	5–10	1–5	7th	
2011	Adam Pascal/Jim Morrissey	2–13*	1–5*	6th	
Adam Pascal:		22–70* (.239)	3–34* (.081)		
Jim Morrissey (Patriot League) (2011–2014)
2012	Jim Morrissey	5–10	0–6	7th	
2013	Jim Morrissey	7–8	2–4	5th	
2014	Jim Morrissey/Justin Hager	3–12**	1–7**	T–8th	
Jim Morrissey:		17–37** (.315)	4–21* (.160)		
Judd Lattimore (Patriot League) (2015–2018)
2015	Judd Lattimore	6–7	3–5	T–6th	
2016	Judd Lattimore	4–11	3–5	T–6th	
2017	Judd Lattimore	5–10	4–4	T–4th	
2018	Judd Lattimore	4–9	2–6	T–7th	
Judd Lattimore:		19–37 (.339)	12–20 (.375)		
Peter Burke (Patriot League) (2019–2020)
2019	Peter Burke	7–7	4–4	T–5th	
2020	Peter Burke	4–3	0–2	†	†
Peter Burke:		11–10 (.524)	4–6 (.400)		
J.L. Reppert (Patriot League) (2021–Present)
2021	J.L Reppert	2–4	1–3	4th (North)	
2022	J.L Reppert	1–13	0–8	9th	
2023	J.L Reppert	1–13	0–8	9th	
2024	J.L Reppert	2–11	0–8	9th	
2025	J.L Reppert	4–11	1–7	9th	
J.L. Reppert:		10–52 (.161)	2–34 (.056)		
Total:		278–591–1 (.320)			
National champion Postseason invitational champion Conference regular season champion Conference regular season and conference tournament champion Division regular season champion Division regular season and conference tournament champion Conference tournament champion

†NCAA canceled 2020 collegiate activities due to the COVID-19 virus.

- Jim Morrissey took over the head coaching position on the 7th game of the 2011 season. Adam Pascal's 0–6 (0–1) mark from that season has been credited to his overall record, while Jim Morrissey's 2–7 (1–4) mark has been credited to his overall record.
  - Justin Hager coached the final game of the 2014 season, going 0–1 (0–0).
