= Army Black Knights men's lacrosse =

- Founded: 1907; 119 years ago
- University: United States Military Academy
- Head coach: Joe Alberici (since 2006 season)
- Stadium: Michie Stadium (capacity: 40,000)
- Location: West Point, New York
- Conference: Patriot League
- Nickname: Black Knights
- Colors: Black, gold, and gray

Pre-NCAA era championships
- 1923, 1944, 1945, 1951, 1958, 1959, 1961, 1969

NCAA Tournament Final Fours
- 1971, 1984

NCAA Tournament Quarterfinals
- 1971, 1972, 1973, 1978, 1981, 1982, 1983, 1984, 1985, 1993, 2010, 2023

NCAA Tournament appearances
- (19) 1971, 1972, 1973, 1978, 1981, 1982, 1983, 1984, 1985, 1987, 1993, 1996, 2003, 2004, 2005, 2010, 2019, 2023, 2026

Conference Tournament championships
- 2010, 2019, 2023, 2026

Conference regular season championships
- 1991, 1992, 1993, 1994, 1995, 1997, 1998, 1999, 2002, 2003, 2005, 2008, 2010, 2017, 2023, 2024, 2025, 2026

The Army Black Knights men's lacrosse team represents the United States Military Academy (USMA, commonly known as "West Point") in National Collegiate Athletic Association (NCAA) Division I men's lacrosse competition. During the team's 92-year history, it has won eight national championships and made fifteen postseason NCAA tournament appearances. The team currently holds the fifth-most wins of any team, with an all-time record of 705–332–7.

== History ==
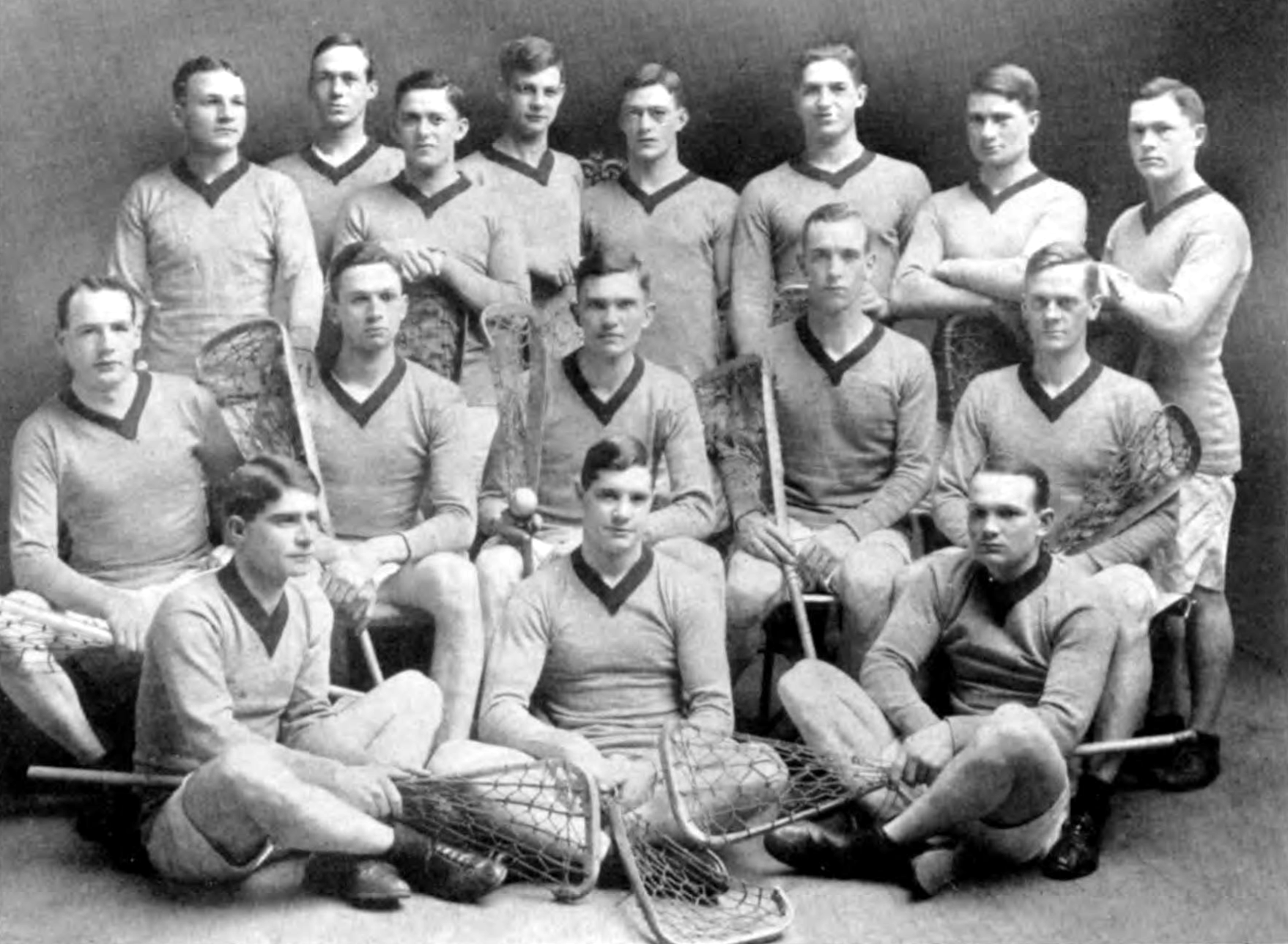
A team of 1910

The first Army lacrosse game was played in 1907 against Stevens Tech. The Cadets won that season's only contest, 3–1. In 1909 and 1910, Army again fielded a lacrosse team, which mostly played local high school and club teams, but also a game each against Stevens Tech and Columbia. In those first three seasons, Army won all ten games it played. In 1921, lacrosse returned to West Point for good. After a 2–3 mark that season, the Cadets improved to 6–1 the following year, which was the start to a 33-year streak of winning seasons. In 1923, Army finished with an 8–1–1 record and was named the national championship team by the United States Intercollegiate Lacrosse Association (USILA).

In 1929, F. Morris Touchstone became the head coach. He remained in that post for 29 years and became Army's all-time winningest head coach in terms of wins with a record of 214–73–4 and winning percentage of 0.743. During this period, the lacrosse and football teams were closely connected and shared many personnel, as football players found the sport an excellent way to remain physically fit during the off-season. In both 1944 and 1945, Army won national championships in lacrosse and football.

Bill Carpenter, the "Lonesome End" and a future Distinguished Service Cross recipient, continued the tradition as both a football and lacrosse star. After Touchstone's death, James F. Adams took over as head coach in 1958, and in that first season, led the Cadets to their first perfect record since 1910 and the national championship. He stayed on for 12 years and compiled three more shared titles and a winning percentage of 0.777. In 1961, Adams was named the national Coach of the Year.

Adams was replaced by Al Pisano. In 1971, the NCAA became the awarding authority for the lacrosse national championship and instituted the NCAA tournament. Army participated in each of the first three events. In the inaugural tournament, the Cadets routed Hofstra in order to advance to the final four, where Cornell edged them by one goal. Dick Edell replaced Pisano, and served for seven years before leaving to become Maryland's long-time coach.

During the 1980s, Army appeared in six NCAA tournaments, including five consecutive ones starting in 1981. In 1984, Jack Emmer became head coach, and Army advanced to the final four, before being eliminated by Syracuse. The 1993 team finished with a 12–4 record, which included a defeat of Maryland in the first round of the NCAA tournament. In 1991, Army joined the Patriot League, and won its first 25 consecutive conference games, a league record. In 1999, the athletic teams, formerly known as the "Cadets", officially changed their name to the "Black Knights".

Army made three straight NCAA tournament appearances from 2003 to 2005. The following season, former assistant coach Joe Alberici returned to West Point to assume the head job. That year, the Black Knights finished as runners-up in the Patriot League and narrowly missed a tournament berth. In 2008, Army earned the conference regular season championship and Alberici was named the Patriot League Coach of the Year.

== Home stadium ==
Army currently plays its home games at Michie Stadium, which is also the homefield of the football team and has an official capacity of 40,000. Prior to that, Army lacrosse used "The Plain" (the main parade ground), Clinton Field, Daly Field, and Shea Stadium.

== Championships ==
From 1934 through 1970, the United States Intercollegiate Lacrosse Association (USILA) awarded the Wingate Memorial Trophy to the NCAA Division I annual champion, based on regular-season records. Since 1971, the annual NCAA Men's Lacrosse Championship tournament has determined the top team in NCAA Division I lacrosse. Army has been awarded eight national championships, but none since the implementation of the NCAA tournament.

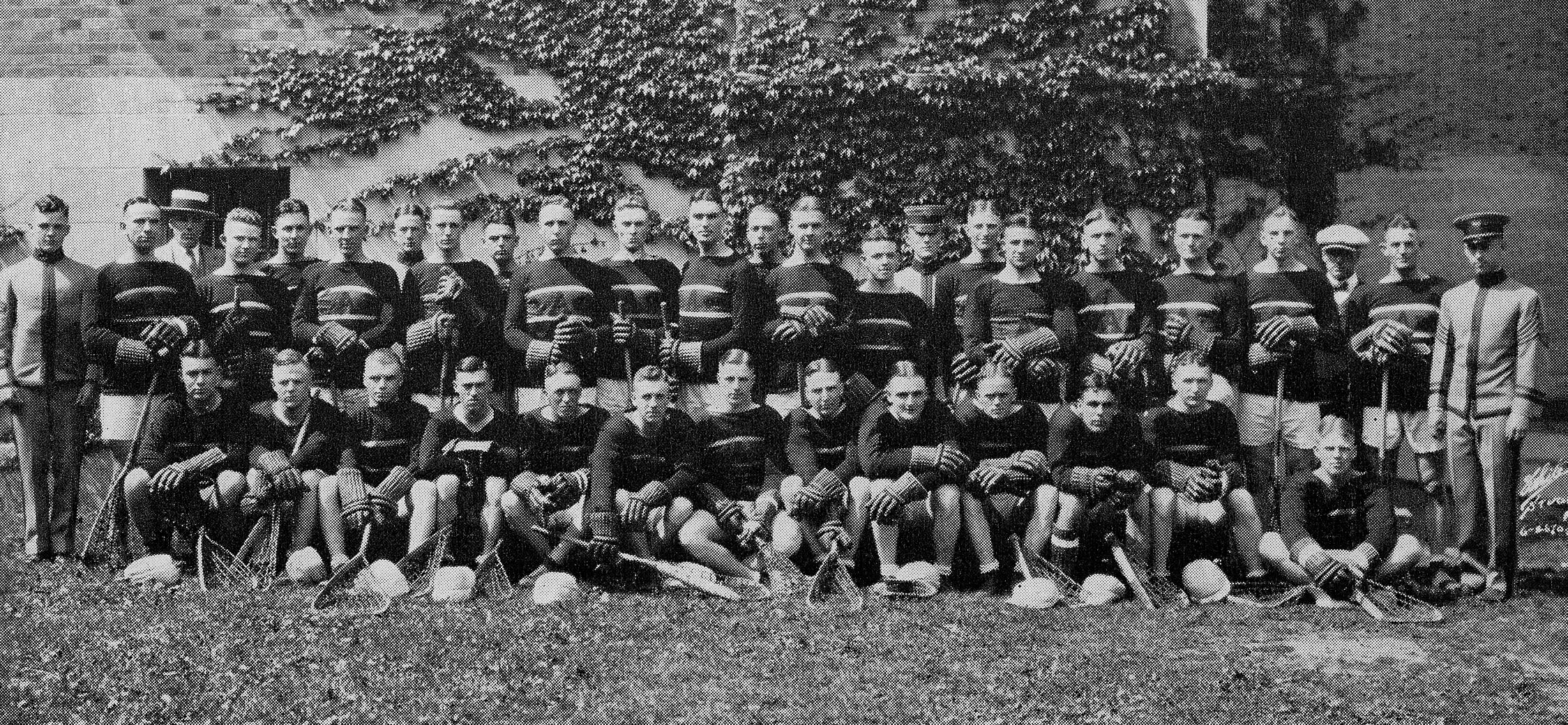
1924 team

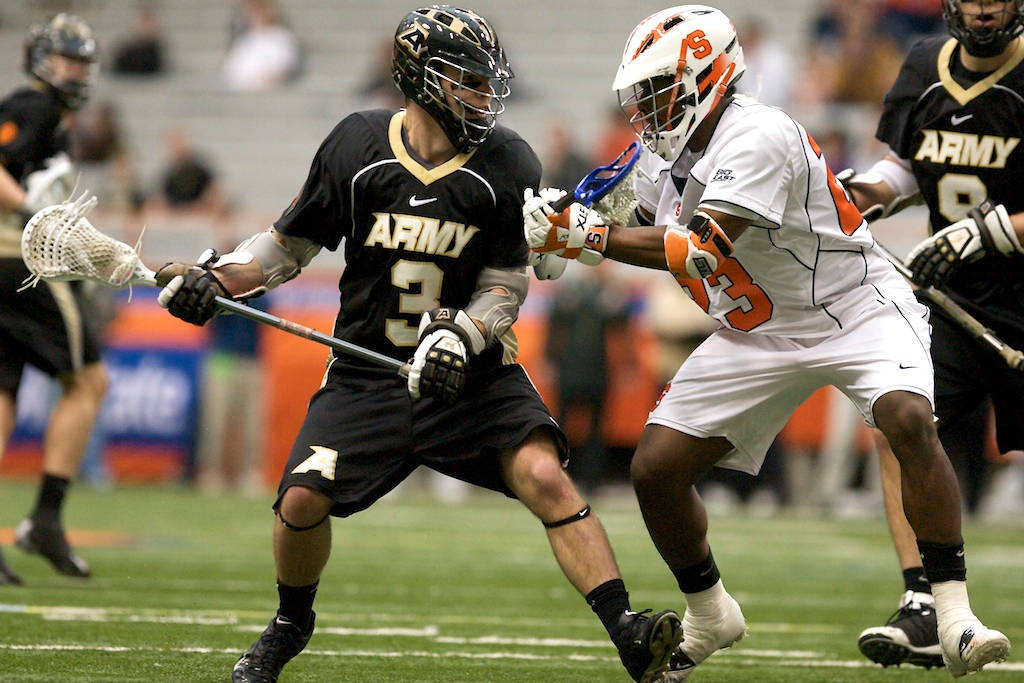
Brandon Butler against Syracuse in 2010

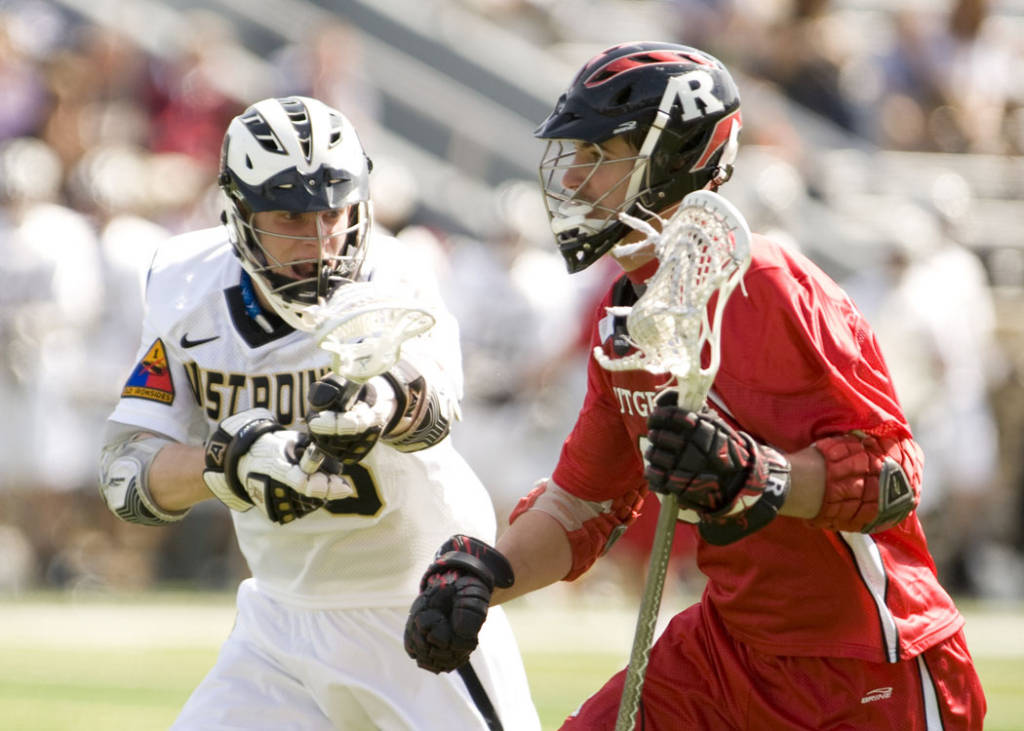
Army versus Rutgers in 2010

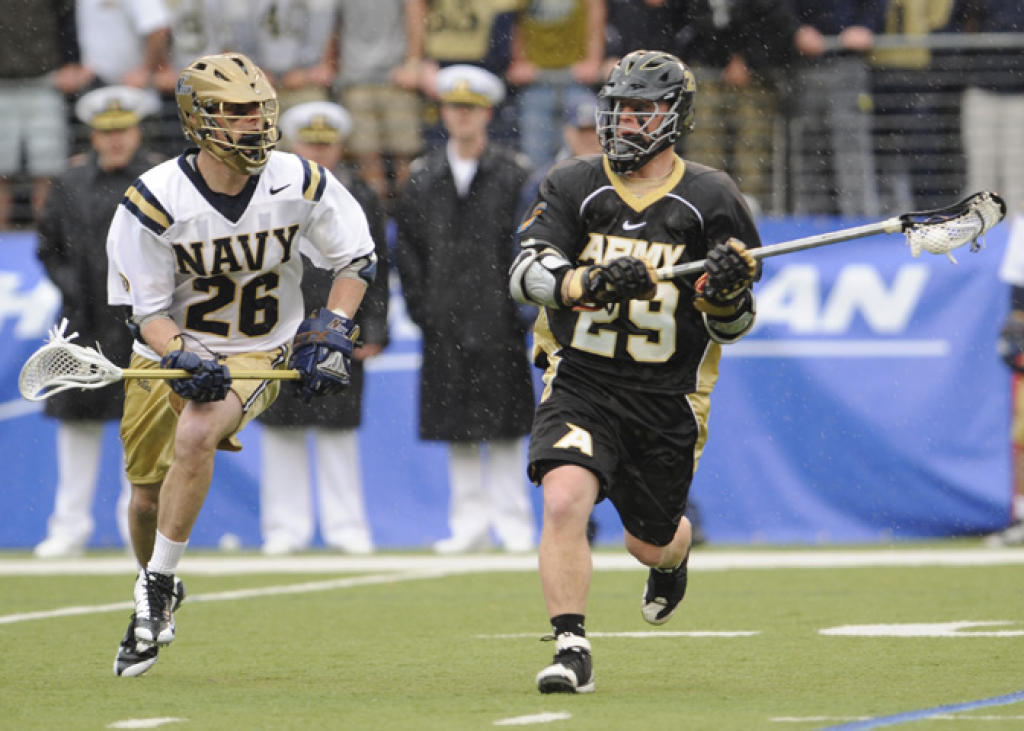
Rob McCallion midfielder in action against Navy during the 2009 Day of Rivals

| Year | National championships | Coach | Record |
|---|---|---|---|
| 1923 | USILA Championship | Talbot Hunter | 8–1–1 |
| 1944 | Wingate Trophy | F. Morris Touchstone | 6–2 |
| 1945 | Wingate Trophy (with Navy) | F. Morris Touchstone | 5–1–1 |
| 1951 | Wingate Trophy (with Princeton) | F. Morris Touchstone | 8–2 |
| 1958 | Wingate Trophy | James F. Adams | 9–0 |
| 1959 | Wingate Trophy (with Johns Hopkins) | James F. Adams | 8–2 |
| 1961 | Wingate Trophy (with Navy) | James F. Adams | 9–2 |
| 1969 | Wingate Trophy (with Johns Hopkins) | James F. Adams | 10–1 |

== Season results ==
The following is a list of Army's results by season as an NCAA Division I program:

| Season | Coach | Overall | Conference | Standing | Postseason |
|---|---|---|---|---|---|
Al Pisano (Independent) (1970–1976)
| 1971 | Al Pisano | 11–2 | | | NCAA Division I Final Four |
| 1972 | Al Pisano | 10–4 | | | NCAA Division I Quarterfinals |
| 1973 | Al Pisano | 6–5 | | | NCAA Division I Quarterfinals |
| 1974 | Al Pisano | 3–7 | | | |
| 1975 | Al Pisano | 5–5 | | | |
| 1976 | Al Pisano | 6–6 | | | |
| Al Pisano: | | 48–32 (.600) | | | |
Dick Edell (Independent) (1977–1983)
| 1977 | Dick Edell | 8–3 | | | |
| 1978 | Dick Edell | 10–3 | | | NCAA Division I Quarterfinals |
| 1979 | Dick Edell | 10–3 | | | |
| 1980 | Dick Edell | 8–4 | | | |
| 1981 | Dick Edell | 10–4 | | | NCAA Division I Quarterfinals |
| 1982 | Dick Edell | 9–4 | | | NCAA Division I Quarterfinals |
| 1983 | Dick Edell | 11–3 | | | NCAA Division I Quarterfinals |
| Dick Edell: | | 66–24 (.733) | | | |
Jack Emmer (Independent) (1984–1990)
| 1984 | Jack Emmer | 11–3 | | | NCAA Division I Final Four |
| 1985 | Jack Emmer | 10–4 | | | NCAA Division I Quarterfinals |
| 1986 | Jack Emmer | 6–6 | | | |
| 1987 | Jack Emmer | 10–5 | | | NCAA Division I First Round |
| 1988 | Jack Emmer | 7–7 | | | |
| 1989 | Jack Emmer | 5–9 | | | |
| 1990 | Jack Emmer | 4–9 | | | |
Jack Emmer (Patriot League) (1991–2005)
| 1991 | Jack Emmer | 10–4 | 5–0 | 1st | |
| 1992 | Jack Emmer | 10–4 | 5–0 | 1st | |
| 1993 | Jack Emmer | 12–4 | 5–0 | 1st | NCAA Division I Quarterfinals |
| 1994 | Jack Emmer | 8–7 | 5–0 | 1st | |
| 1995 | Jack Emmer | 6–8 | 5–0 | 1st | |
| 1996 | Jack Emmer | 10–5 | 4–1 | 2nd | NCAA Division I First Round |
| 1997 | Jack Emmer | 9–5 | 5–0 | 1st | |
| 1998 | Jack Emmer | 7–7 | 5–0 | 1st | |
| 1999 | Jack Emmer | 8–6 | 4–1 | T–1st | |
| 2000 | Jack Emmer | 8–7 | 4–2 | 3rd | |
| 2001 | Jack Emmer | 8–6 | 4–2 | 3rd | |
| 2002 | Jack Emmer | 8–6 | 5–1 | T–1st | |
| 2003 | Jack Emmer | 8–8 | 5–1 | T–1st | NCAA Division I First Round |
| 2004 | Jack Emmer | 10–5 | 4–3 | T–3rd | NCAA Division I First Round |
| 2005 | Jack Emmer | 11–6 | 5–1 | T–1st | NCAA Division I First Round |
| Jack Emmer: | | 186–88 (.679) | 70–12 (.854) | | |
Joe Alberici (Patriot League) (2006–Present)
| 2006 | Joe Alberici | 8–7 | 4–2 | T–3rd | |
| 2007 | Joe Alberici | 6–9 | 3–3 | 4th | |
| 2008 | Joe Alberici | 9–6 | 5–1 | T–1st | |
| 2009 | Joe Alberici | 6–10 | 2–4 | T–4th | |
| 2010 | Joe Alberici | 11–6 | 6–0 | 1st | NCAA Division I Quarterfinals |
| 2011 | Joe Alberici | 9–6 | 4–2 | 3rd | |
| 2012 | Joe Alberici | 7–8 | 4–2 | 3rd | |
| 2013 | Joe Alberici | 8–6 | 4–2 | 3rd | |
| 2014 | Joe Alberici | 9–5 | 7–1 | 2nd | |
| 2015 | Joe Alberici | 10–7 | 4–4 | 5th | |
| 2016 | Joe Alberici | 10–7 | 5–3 | T–3rd | |
| 2017 | Joe Alberici | 12–4 | 6–2 | T–1st | |
| 2018 | Joe Alberici | 5–8 | 2–6 | T–7th | |
| 2019 | Joe Alberici | 13–5 | 5–3 | T–2nd | NCAA Division I First Round |
| 2020 | Joe Alberici | 6–2 | 2–0 | † | † |
| 2021 | Joe Alberici | 7–4 | 5–2 | 1st (North) | |
| 2022 | Joe Alberici | 12–4 | 6–2 | T–2nd | |
| 2023 | Joe Alberici | 13–4 | 7–1 | T–1st | NCAA Division I Quarterfinals |
| 2024 | Joe Alberici | 11–3 | 6–2 | T–1st | |
| 2025 | Joe Alberici | 12–2 | 7–1 | 1st | |
| 2026 | Joe Alberici | 13–4 | 6–2 | T–1st | NCAA Division I First Round |
| Joe Alberici: | | 196–117 (.626) | 100–45 (.690) | | |
| Total: | | 873–417–7 (.676) | | | |
National champion Postseason invitational champion Conference regular season champion Conference regular season and conference tournament champion Division regular season champion Division regular season and conference tournament champion Conference tournament champion

†NCAA canceled 2020 collegiate activities due to the COVID-19 virus.

== See also ==
- USILA#List of ILA.2C USILL.2C USILA Champions 1881-1935
- Lacrosse in Pennsylvania
- F. Morris Touchstone Award
- Lt. Raymond Enners Award
