= Cortland Red Dragons men's lacrosse =

NCAA Division III lacrosse team

- Founded: 1926; 100 years ago
- University: State University of New York at Cortland
- Head coach: Lelan Rogers
- Stadium: Stadium Complex Red Field (capacity: 6,500)
- Location: Cortland, NY
- Conference: SUNYAC
- Nickname: Red Dragons
- Colors: Red and white

Pre-NCAA era championships
- 1973

NCAA Tournament championships
- 1975, 2006, 2009

NCAA Tournament Runner-Up
- 1980, 1981, 2007, 2008, 2012

NCAA Tournament Final Fours
- (9) - 1972, 1974, 1978, 1985, 1986, 2003, 2010, 2013

NCAA Tournament Quarterfinals
- (14) - 1976, 1977, 1979, 1984, 1987, 1988, 1989, 2002, 2004, 2005, 2011, 2014, 2015, 2017

NCAA Tournament appearances
- (36) - 1972, 1974-1978, 1984-1989, 1998, 2001-2019, 2021, 2022

Conference regular season championships
- (29) - 1978-1981, 1983-1987, 2000-2005, 2007, 2008, 2010-19, 2021, 2022

The Cortland Red Dragons men's lacrosse team represents SUNY Cortland in National Collegiate Athletic Association (NCAA) Division III men's lacrosse. The Red Dragons compete in the State University of New York Athletic Conference (SUNYAC) and play home games in the city of Cortland, NY. The team was recently coached by Steve Beville, who led the Red Dragons to a national title in 2009 and retired after the 2023 season. Coach Lelan Rogers, who guided the Red Dragons to a 76–17 record from 2001 to 2005, returned to Cortland as the head coach in the fall of 2023. In addition to winning four national championships, Cortland has won a record 28 conference championships until 2022.

== History ==
=== Early years ===
The Red Dragons began playing men's lacrosse in 1926 under head coach W.P. Ashbrook. After the 1928 season, the team did not compete again until 1947, then under head coach Jack MacPhee, and has competed every year since.

=== NCAA to USILA and back ===
Cortland would achieve significant success under head coach Jack Emmer from 1970 to 1972, going 32-6 and reaching the semifinals of the second ever NCAA Men's Lacrosse Tournament in 1972. After beating Navy 9–8 in overtime of the quarterfinals, the team's season would end with a loss to the eventual and then first-time NCAA champion Virginia Cavaliers. The following season, Emmer would leave for Washington and Lee and be replaced by Chuck Winters. In Winters' first year as head coach, the team would compete in the USILA College Division Tournament and defeat Washington College of Maryland to win the first national championship in its lacrosse program's history. Following the 1973 victory, the NCAA would split into Divisions I and II, with the Dragons competing in the latter and winning their first and only Division II Championship in 1975. Winters would go 94-55 during his tenure and become the school's winningest coach, a distinction he would hold until surpassed by Steve Beville in 2012. Between 1978 and 1987, under Winters and his eventual replacement Jerry Casciani, the Red Dragons would win all but one (1982) SUNYAC Championship. During that time, the team would reach the NCAA Division III finals twice, in 1980 and 1981, both times losing to the Hobart Statesmen.

=== Division III Success ===
In 2006, under head coach and former Dragons All-American goalie Rich Barnes, the team would win its first NCAA championship since becoming a Division III competitor in 1980, beating the Salisbury Sea Gulls in overtime of the title game 13–12. The Red Dragons' victory ended Salisbury's 69-game winning streak. Former Vermont Head Coach Steve Beville would replace Barnes the following year and help deliver the Red Dragons' second Division III Championship in 2009. Under Beville, the team would make the NCAA Tournament every year it was held until 2023. On July 19, 2023, it was announced that Steve Beville would retire as Red Dragons Head Coach.

== Season Results ==
The following is a list of Cortland's results by season as an NCAA program:

Season	Coach	Overall	Conference	Standing	Postseason
Jack Emmer (Independent) (1970–1972)
1970	Jack Emmer	7–3			
1971	Jack Emmer	11–1			
1972	Jack Emmer	14–2			NCAA Semifinals
Jack Emmer:		32-6 (.842)			
Chuck Winters (Independent) (1973–1977)
1973	Chuck Winters	13–2			USILA College Division Champions
1974	Chuck Winters	8–3			NCAA Division II Semifinals
1975	Chuck Winters	10–4			NCAA Division II Champions
1976	Chuck Winters	5–6			NCAA Division II Quarterfinals
1977	Chuck Winters	8–5			NCAA Division II Quarterfinals
Chuck Winters (SUNYAC) (1978–1983)
1978	Chuck Winters	9-4	5-0	1st	NCAA Division II Semifinals
1979	Chuck Winters	6–10	5-0	1st	NCAA Division II Quarterfinals
1980	Chuck Winters	9–5	5–0	1st	NCAA Division III Finals
1981	Chuck Winters	11–5	5–0	1st	NCAA Division III Finals
1982	Chuck Winters	7–6	4–1	2nd	
1983	Chuck Winters	8–5	6–0	1st	
Chuck Winters:		94–55 (.676)	30-1 (.968)		
Jerry Casciani (SUNYAC) (1984–1987)
1984	Jerry Casciani	8–6	6–0	1st	NCAA Division III Quarterfinals
1985	Jerry Casciani	10–5	6–0	1st	NCAA Division III Semifinals
1986	Jerry Casciani	11–5	6–0	1st	NCAA Division III Semifinals
1987	Jerry Casciani	9–7	6–0	1st	NCAA Division III Quarterfinals
Jerry Casciani (Independent) (1988–1990)
1988	Jerry Casciani	6–6			NCAA Division III Quarterfinals
1989	Jerry Casciani	8–7			NCAA Division III Quarterfinals
1990	Jerry Casciani	8-8			
Jerry Casciani:		60–44 (.512)	24-0 (1.000)		
Rick Young (Independent) (1991–1991)
1991	Rick Young	7-8			
Rick Young:		7–8 (.467)			
Mike Pounds (Independent) (1992–1995)
1992	Mike Pounds	7-8			ECAC Upstate NY Playoffs
1993	Mike Pounds	6-6			
1994	Mike Pounds	9-4			
1995	Mike Pounds	2-10			
Mike Pounds (Super Six) (1996–1999)
1996	Mike Pounds	9-5	3-2	T-2nd	
1997	Mike Pounds	4-10	0-5	6th	
1998	Mike Pounds	9-6	3-2	T-2nd	NCAA Division III First Round
1999	Mike Pounds	7-7	2-3	T-3rd	
Mike Pounds (SUNYAC) (2000–2000)
2000	Mike Pounds	10-5	6-0	1st	
Mike Pounds:		63–61 (.508)	14-12 (.538)		
Lelan Rogers (SUNYAC) (2001–2005)
2001	Lelan Rogers	11-6	6-0	1st	NCAA Division III First Round
2002	Lelan Rogers	16-3	7-0	1st	NCAA Division III Quarterfinals
2003	Lelan Rogers	17-3	7-0	1st	NCAA Division III Semifinals
2004	Lelan Rogers	15-3	6-0	1st	NCAA Division III Quarterfinals
2005	Lelan Rogers	17-2	6-0	1st	NCAA Division III Quarterfinals
Lelan Rogers:		76–17 (.817)	32-0 (1.000)		
Rich Barnes (SUNYAC) (2006–2006)
2006	Rich Barnes	18-3	5-1	2nd	NCAA Division III Champions
Rich Barnes:		18–3 (.857)	5-1 (.833)		
Steve Beville (SUNYAC) (2007–2023)
2007	Steve Beville	15-6	6-0	1st	NCAA Division III Finals
2008	Steve Beville	18-2	7-0	1st	NCAA Division III Finals
2009	Steve Beville	19-2	6-1	2nd	NCAA Division III Champions
2010	Steve Beville	17-3	6-0	1st	NCAA Division III Semifinals
2011	Steve Beville	16-3	6-0	1st	NCAA Division III Quarterfinals
2012	Steve Beville	21-1	6-0	1st	NCAA Division III Finals
2013	Steve Beville	19-1	6-0	1st	NCAA Division III Semifinals
2014	Steve Beville	17-4	6-0	1st	NCAA Division III Quarterfinals
2015	Steve Beville	16-5	6-0	1st	NCAA Division III Quarterfinals
2016	Steve Beville	14-6	6-0	1st	NCAA Division III Second Round
2017	Steve Beville	17-3	6-0	1st	NCAA Division III Quarterfinals
2018	Steve Beville	12-7	5-1	1st	NCAA Division III Second Round
2019	Steve Beville	14-5	6-0	1st	NCAA Division III Second Round
2020	Steve Beville	3-1	0-0		No Postseason held
2021	Steve Beville	11-4	5-1	T-1st (West)	NCAA Division III Second Round
2022	Steve Beville	13-7	7-0	1st	NCAA Division III Second Round
2023	Steve Beville	13-5	6-1	2nd	
Steve Beville:		255–65 (.797)	96-4 (.960)		
Total:		605–259 (.700)			
National champion Postseason invitational champion Conference regular season champion Conference regular season and conference tournament champion Division regular season champion Division regular season and conference tournament champion Conference tournament champion
