= Jim Berkman =

Lacrosse coach

Current position
- Title: Head coach
- Team: Salisbury
- Conference: C2C
- Record: 661–70

Biographical details
- Born: Watertown, New York, U.S.

Playing career

Lacrosse
- 1979–1982: St. Lawrence

Basketball
- c. 1980: St. Lawrence
- Position: Midfielder (lacrosse)

Coaching career (HC unless noted)

Lacrosse
- 1983–1984: Salisbury (assistant)
- 1985: SUNY Potsdam
- 1986–1988: St. Lawrence (assistant)
- 1989–present: Salisbury

Basketball
- 1985–1988: St. Lawrence

Women's soccer
- 1994–2000: Salisbury

Head coaching record
- Overall: 559–65 (lacrosse); 32–44 (basketball); 102–28–5 (women's soccer)

Accomplishments and honors

Championships
- Lacrosse; 13 NCAA Division III (1994, 1995, 1999, 2003, 2004, 2005, 2007, 2008, 2011, 2012, 2016, 2017, 2023); 19 CAC (1995–2009, 2011–2012, 2014–2015) Men's basketball ICAC (1988) Women's soccer 2 CAC (1994, 2000)

Awards
- 3× USILA Division III Coach of the Year (1991, 2008, 2012); 9× CAC Coach of the Year (1996, 2002–2003, 2005–2008, 2010, 2012); 2× FieldTurf Tarkett Division III Coach of the Year (2006–2007); USILA Howdy Myers Man of the Year (2012); Second-Team All-American (1982); St. Lawrence University Hall of Fame

Records
- Most career coaching wins at any level; Highest winning percentage at any level
- U.S. Lacrosse Hall of Fame; Inducted in 2013

James Berkman is an American college lacrosse coach. He has served as the head coach at Salisbury University since 1989, after spending one season as the head coach at State University of New York at Potsdam (SUNY Potsdam) in 1985. Salisbury has won 13 NCAA Division III Men's Lacrosse Championships and 19 Capital Athletic Conference (CAC) titles during his tenure with the Sea Gulls. He has been named the Division III coach of the year four times and the CAC Coach of the Year ten times.

In 2008, Berkman surpassed Jack Emmer's former record of 326 wins to become the all-time winningest NCAA men's lacrosse coach.

== Early life ==
Berkman grew up in Watertown, New York. He attended nearby St. Lawrence University, where he played basketball and lacrosse as a midfielder. He scored thirty goals to finish his college career as the third all-time scorer for the Saints. In basketball, he averaged 8.2 points per game and finished his career as the all-time leader in assists. As a senior in 1982, he was named a second-team lacrosse All-American and played in the North-South All-Star Game. That year, he was named the Most Valuable Player on both the lacrosse and basketball teams and the Outstanding Male Senior Athlete.

== Coaching career ==
=== Early coaching positions ===
He then attended graduate school for two years at Salisbury University, where he also served as an assistant lacrosse coach. In 1985, as the head coach at Potsdam State he led the lacrosse team to a school-record of nine wins. He then returned to his alma mater and, in addition to coaching lacrosse, he led the men's basketball team to the ICAC championship during the 1987–88 season. The following year, he returned to Salisbury.

=== Salisbury ===
Berkman took over as the Salisbury men's lacrosse head coach in 1989. Each season since, he has guided the team to the NCAA tournament, for a total of 33 consecutive appearances. He has compiled a 588-62 record. From the season they entered the Capital Athletic Conference (CAC) in 1995 until the 2009 NCAA tournament quarterfinals, He led Salisbury to 105 consecutive conference wins and 24 conference championships. The Sea Gulls under Berkman have secured the Division III national championship in 1994, 1995, 1999, 2003, 2004, 2005, 2007, 2008, 2011, 2012, 2016, 2017, and 2023, and appeared in the final in 1991, 2000, 2006, 2010, 2014, 2018, and 2021.

=== Honors and records ===
The St. Lawrence Athletics Hall of Fame inducted Berkman in 2001. He was awarded the 1991 Francis "Babe" Kraus Award, the 2008 United States Intercollegiate Lacrosse Association (USILA) Division III Coach of the Year honors, and the FieldTurf Tarkett Coach of the Year honors in 2006 and 2007. He was named the CAC Coach of the Year in 1991, 1996, 2002, 2003, and each year from 2005 to 2008.

During the 2008 NCAA tournament, he surpassed Army coach Jack Emmer's former record of 326 wins to become the all-time winningest NCAA lacrosse coach. By the end of the 2009 season, he had expanded it to 337 wins. Under Berkman, Salisbury has also secured numerous records for winning streaks. The Sea Gulls compiled an NCAA record 105-game conference winning streak from the start of the 1995 season through the 2009 NCAA tournament. They also compiled 69-, 55-, and 47-game consecutive winning streaks, an 87-game regular season winning streak, and an 80-game home winning streak.

== Personal life ==
Berkman resides in Salisbury, Maryland with his wife, Jennifer, who is the Student Health Services director at Salisbury University. Their son, Kylor, played as a midfielder on the lacrosse team coached by his father, and in 2009 became the first player to be named National Midfielder of the Year three consecutive years. Their daughter planned to attend Mount Saint Mary's University in 2010 to play women's lacrosse. His nephew, Rick Berkman, was an all American player for his uncle at Salisbury and has been the men's lacrosse coach at SUNY Potsdam for 29 years.
