= 1978 NCAA Division II lacrosse tournament =

1977 NCAA Division II Men's Lacrosse Championship
Tournament information
- Sport: College lacrosse
- Location: (New York (state)) Geneva, New York (final)
- Host(s): Hobart and William Smith Colleges (final)
- Venue(s): Boswell Field (final)
- Participants: 12

Final positions
- Champions: Roanoke (1st title)
- Runner-up: Hobart (5th title game)

Tournament statistics
- Matches played: 11
- Goals scored: 293 (26.64 per match)
- Attendance: 9,043 (822 per match)
- Top scorer(s): Richard Graham, Roanoke (20)

The 1978 NCAA Division II Lacrosse Championship was the fifth annual single-elimination tournament to determine the national champions of NCAA Division II and Division III men's college lacrosse in the United States.

A separate Division III men's championship would not be introduced until 1980.

This year's final was played at Boswell Field at the Hobart College in Geneva, New York.

Roanoke defeated two-time defending champion Hobart in the final, 14–13, to win their first national title. This was also Hobart's fifth consecutive appearance in the tournament's championship final.

The Maroons (12–2) were coached by Paul Griffin.

== Bracket ==
First Round
Ithaca	15
Salisbury State	9
Towson State	24
New Haven	5
Adelphi	23
Baltimore	15
Washington College	10
Ohio Wesleyan	6

Quarterfinals
Hobart	29
Ithaca	6
Cortland	13
Towson State	12
Roanoke	13
Adelphi	8
UMBC	16
Washington College	10

Semifinals
Hobart	24
Cortland	9
Roanoke	12
UMBC	7

Championship
Hobart	13
Roanoke	14

== See also ==
- 1978 NCAA Division I Lacrosse Championship
