= 1981 NCAA Division III lacrosse tournament =

American collegiate lacrosse tournament

1981 NCAA Division III Lacrosse Championship
Tournament information
- Sport: College lacrosse
- Location: (New York (state)) Geneva, New York
- Host: Hobart and William Smith Colleges (final)
- Venue: Boswell Field (final)
- Participants: 8

Final positions
- Champions: Hobart (2nd title)
- Runner-up: Cortland (2nd title game)

Tournament statistics
- Matches played: 7
- Goals scored: 178 (25.43 per match)
- Attendance: 6,364 (909 per match)
- MVP: Bill Sipperly, Hobart
- Top scorer(s): Mark Koetzner, Cortland (23)

The 1981 NCAA Division III Lacrosse Championship was the second annual tournament to determine the national champions of NCAA Division III men's college lacrosse in the United States.

The tournament field included eight teams, with the final played at Boswell Field at the Hobart and William Smith Colleges in Geneva, New York.

In a rematch of the 1980 final, hosts and defending champions Hobart defeated Cortland in the final, 10–8, to win their second Division III national title.

== Bracket ==
Quarterfinals
Hobart	27
FDU Florham	4
Roanoke	11
Washington College	12
Ohio Wesleyan	5
Cortland	18
Salisbury State	18
St. Lawrence	11

Semifinals
Hobart	23
Washington College	6
Cortland	14
Salisbury State	9

Championship
Hobart	10
Cortland	8

== See also ==
- 1981 NCAA Division I Lacrosse Championship
- 1981 NCAA Division II Lacrosse Championship
