= 1985 NCAA Division III men's lacrosse tournament =

American collegiate lacrosse tournament

1985 NCAA Division III Lacrosse Championship
Tournament information
- Sport: College lacrosse
- Location: Chestertown, Maryland
- Host: Washington College (final)
- Venue: Kibler Field (final)
- Participants: 8

Final positions
- Champions: Hobart (6th title)
- Runner-up: Washington College (3rd title game)

Tournament statistics
- Matches played: 7
- Goals scored: 168 (24 per match)
- Attendance: 6,446 (921 per match)
- MVP: Marc Van Arsdale, Hobart
- Top scorer(s): Marc Van Arsdale, Hobart (19)

The 1985 NCAA Division III Men's Lacrosse Championship was the sixth annual tournament to determine the national champions of NCAA Division III men's college lacrosse in the United States.

The tournament field included eight teams, with the final played at Kibler Field at Washington College in Chestertown, Maryland.

In a rematch of the previous year's championship game, five-time defending champions Hobart defeated hosts Washington College in the final, 15–8, to win their sixth Division III national title.

== Bracket ==
Quarterfinals
Springfield	10
Washington College	28
Cortland	11
Ohio Wesleyan	5
RIT	12
Roanoke	4
Denison	8
Hobart	17

Semifinals
Washington College	16
Cortland	10
RIT	8
Hobart	16

Championship
Washington College	8
Hobart	15

== See also ==
- 1985 NCAA Division I Men's Lacrosse Championship
- 1985 NCAA Division III Women's Lacrosse Championship (inaugural edition)
