= 1977 NCAA Division II lacrosse tournament =

1977 NCAA Division II Men's Lacrosse Championship
Tournament information
- Sport: College lacrosse
- Location: (New York (state)) Geneva, New York (final)
- Host(s): Hobart and William Smith Colleges (final)
- Venue(s): Boswell Field (final)
- Participants: 12

Final positions
- Champions: Hobart (2nd title)
- Runner-up: Washington College (1st title game)

Tournament statistics
- Matches played: 11
- Goals scored: 299 (27.18 per match)
- Attendance: 10,705 (973 per match)
- Top scorer(s): Roy McAdam, Hobart (21)

The 1977 NCAA Division II Lacrosse Championship was the fourth annual single-elimination tournament to determine the national champions of NCAA Division II and Division III men's college lacrosse in the United States.

A separate Division III men's championship would not be introduced until 1980.

This year's final was played at Boswell Field at the Hobart College in Geneva, New York.

Defending champions Hobart defeated Washington College, 23−13, to win their second national title. This marked four consecutive championship game appearances for Hobart.

The undefeated Statesmen (15–0) were coached by Jerry Schmidt.

== Bracket ==
First Round
Baltimore	11
Salisbury State	10
Adelphi	15
New Haven	9
Ohio Wesleyan	18
Towson State	13
Cortland	12
C.W. Post	7

Quarterfinals
Hobart	26
Baltimore	12
Roanoke	14
Adelphi	12
Washington College	21
Ohio Wesleyan	11
UMBC	17
Cortland	7

Semifinals
Hobart	15
Roanoke	13
Washington College	11
UMBC	9

Championship
Hobart	23
Washington College	13

== See also ==
- 1977 NCAA Division I lacrosse tournament
