= 1982 NCAA Division III lacrosse tournament =

American collegiate lacrosse tournament

1982 NCAA Division III Lacrosse Championship
Tournament information
- Sport: College lacrosse
- Location: (New York (state)) Geneva, New York
- Host: Hobart and William Smith Colleges (final)
- Venue: Boswell Field (final)
- Participants: 8

Final positions
- Champions: Hobart (3rd title)
- Runner-up: Washington College (1st title game)

Tournament statistics
- Matches played: 7
- Goals scored: 186 (26.57 per match)
- Attendance: 4,813 (688 per match)
- MVP: Larry Grimaldi, Hobart
- Top scorer(s): Paul Hooper, Washington College (17)

The 1982 NCAA Division III Lacrosse Championship was the third annual tournament to determine the national champions of NCAA Division III men's college lacrosse in the United States.

The tournament field included eight teams, with the final played at Boswell Field at the Hobart and William Smith Colleges in Geneva, New York.

Hosts and two-time defending champions Hobart defeated Washington College in the final, 9–8 after overtime, to win their third Division III national title.

== Bracket ==
Quarterfinals
Hobart	22
Hampden–Sydney	11
Denison	8
Salisbury State	11
Springfield	14
Washington College	22
Ithaca	11
Roanoke	14

Semifinals
Hobart	22
Salisbury State	4
Washington College	19
Roanoke	11

Championship
Hobart	9*
Washington College	8

== See also ==
- 1982 NCAA Division I Men's Lacrosse Championship
- 1982 NCAA Women's Lacrosse Championship
