= 1983 NCAA Division III lacrosse tournament =

American collegiate lacrosse tournament

1983 NCAA Division III Lacrosse Championship
Tournament information
- Sport: College lacrosse
- Location: (New York (state)) Geneva, New York
- Host: Hobart and William Smith Colleges (final)
- Venue: Boswell Field (final)
- Participants: 8

Final positions
- Champions: Hobart (4th title)
- Runner-up: Roanoke (1st title game)

Tournament statistics
- Matches played: 7
- Goals scored: 161 (23 per match)
- Attendance: 6,394 (913 per match)
- MVP: Marc Van Arsdale, Hobart
- Top scorer(s): Tom Grimaldi, Hobart (19)

The 1983 NCAA Division III Lacrosse Championship was the fourth annual tournament to determine the national champions of NCAA Division III men's college lacrosse in the United States.

The tournament field included eight teams, with the final played at Boswell Field at the Hobart and William Smith Colleges in Geneva, New York.

Hosts and three-time defending champions Hobart defeated Roanoke in the final, 13–9, to win their fourth Division III national title.

== Bracket ==
Quarterfinals
Hobart	14
St. Lawrence	8
Ohio Wesleyan	9
RIT	6
Salisbury State	7
Washington College	19
Ithaca	11
Roanoke	14

Semifinals
Hobart	22
Ohio Wesleyan	7
Washington College	9
Roanoke	13

Championship
Hobart	13
Roanoke	9

== See also ==
- 1983 NCAA Division I Men's Lacrosse Championship
- 1983 NCAA Women's Lacrosse Championship
