= 1984 NCAA Division III lacrosse tournament =

American collegiate lacrosse tournament

Tournament information
- Sport: College lacrosse
- Location: (New York (state)) Geneva, New York
- Host: Hobart and William Smith Colleges (final)
- Venue: Boswell Field (final)
- Participants: 8

Final positions
- Champions: Hobart (4th title)
- Runner-up: Washington College (2nd title game)

Tournament statistics
- Matches played: 7
- Goals scored: 147 (21 per match)
- Attendance: 6,692 (956 per match)
- MVP: Chuck Warren, Hobart
- Top scorer(s): Tom Grimaldi, Hobart (13)

The 1984 NCAA Division III lacrosse tournament was the fifth annual tournament to determine the national champions of NCAA Division III men's college lacrosse in the United States. The tournament field included eight teams, with the final played at Boswell Field at the Hobart and William Smith Colleges in Geneva, New York. Hosts and four-time defending champions Hobart defeated Washington College in the final, 12–5, to win their fifth Division III national title.

== Bracket ==
Quarterfinals
Denison	12
Hobart	21
RIT	11
St. Lawrence	6
Swarthmore	3
Washington College	16
Cortland	7
Salisbury State	12

Semifinals
Hobart	15
RIT	6
Washington College	13
Salisbury State	8

Championship
Hobart	12
Washington College	5

== See also ==
- 1984 NCAA Division I men's lacrosse tournament
- 1984 NCAA women's lacrosse tournament
