= War on the Shore =

Annual lacrosse match between two USA universities

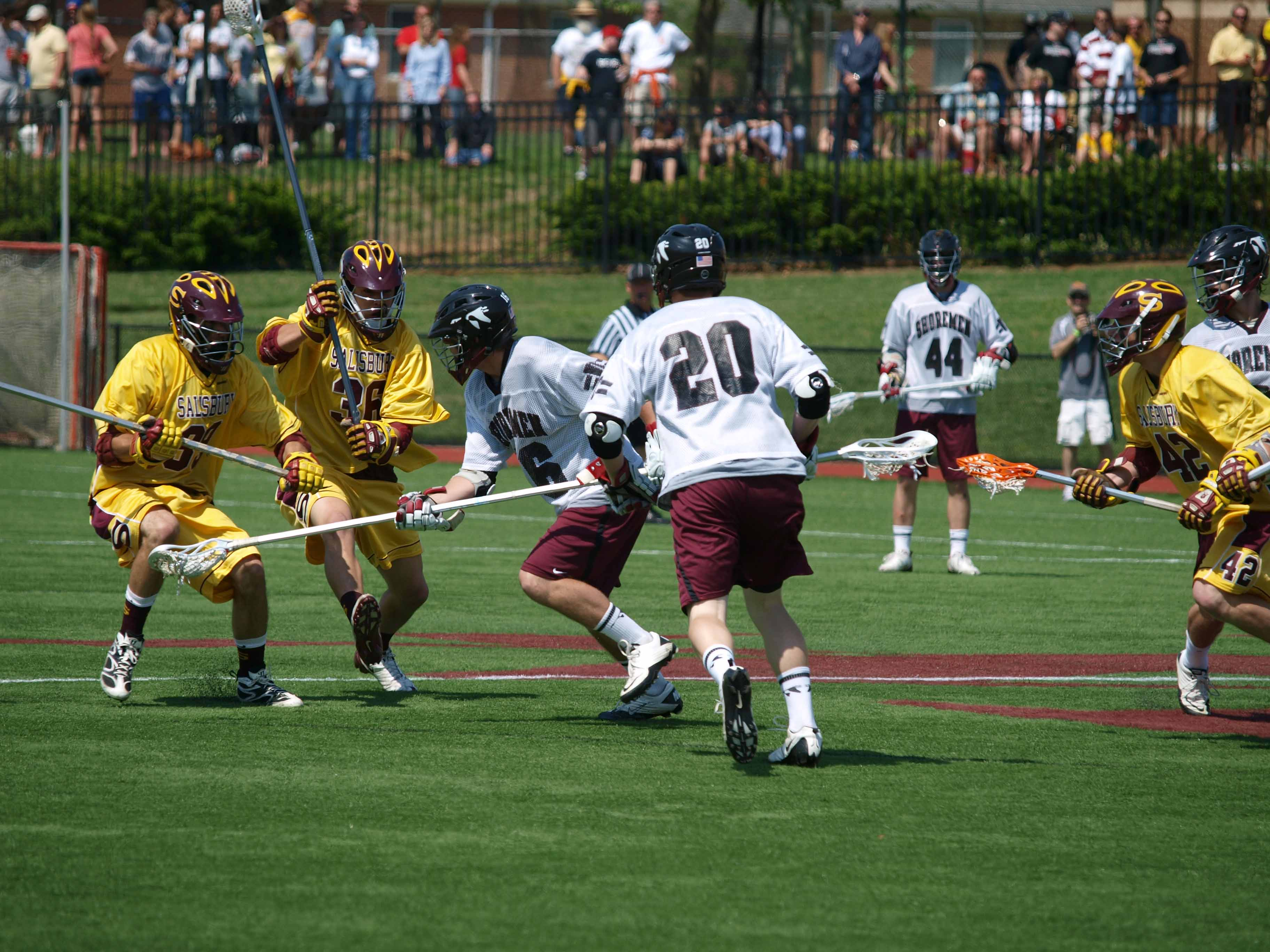
- Sport: Lacrosse
- Teams: Salisbury University; Washington College
- First meeting: April 6, 1974; Washington 16, Salisbury 11
- Latest meeting: April 24, 2026; Salisbury 6, Washington 4
- Stadiums: Roy Kirby Stadium & Sea Gull Stadium
- Trophy: Charles B. Clark Cup

Statistics
- Total meetings: 58
- All-time series: Salisbury, 38-20
- Largest victory: Washington, 24-4 (1986)
- Longest win streak: Washington, 12 (1982-1990); Salisbury, 12 (2003-2012); Salisbury, 12 (2014 - Present)
- Current win streak: Salisbury, 12 (2014 - Present)

The War on the Shore is the annual Men's Lacrosse game between rivals Washington College and Salisbury University. These two schools are located on Maryland's eastern shore and are just 82 miles (132 km) apart. This game is nicknamed "The War on the Shore" because they are two major colleges on the eastern shore of Maryland and the close proximity creates a natural rivalry between the schools. This Division III game is played every spring and is considered one of the most anticipated games of the year in lacrosse.

Charles Branch Clark, a 1934 graduate of Washington College and lacrosse coach at both schools, has been called the "tie binding the lacrosse traditions of both schools." After Clark's passing in December 2003, the Charles B. Clark cup was named in his honor and has since been awarded annually to the winner of the war on the Shore. The game between these two teams draws several thousand fans each year earning this game the title "The Biggest Little Lacrosse Game in America."

The Shoremen and Sea Gulls have faced off 57 times, with Salisbury leading the overall series 37–20, since the series began in 1974, including 10 times in the NCAA Division III Men's Lacrosse Championship. The competition did not occur in 2020 or 2021 amid both universities closing for the COVID-19 pandemic, but returned in 2022.

From 2002 to 2012, the Sea Gulls of Salisbury had won 10 straight games over the Shoremen of Washington until the Shoremen broke the streak with a 7–6 victory in 2013. Each game is played either at Roy Kirby Stadium on the campus of Washington College or Sea Gull Stadium on the campus of Salisbury University.

== Results ==
Salisbury victories	Washington victories	Tie games

No.	Date	Location	Winner	Score
1	April 6, 1974	Chestertown, MD	Washington	16–11
2	April 30, 1975	Salisbury, MD	Salisbury	10–8
3	April 28, 1976	Chestertown, MD	Washington	13–10
4	May 5, 1981	Salisbury, MD	Salisbury	20–15
5	May 1, 1982	Chestertown, MD	Washington	15–9
6	April 30, 1983	Salisbury, MD	Washington	11–10
7	May 11, 1983	Geneva, NY	Washington	19–7
8	April 21, 1984	Chestertown, MD	Washington	14–7
9	May 13, 1984	Geneva, NY	Washington	13–8
10	April 28, 1985	Salisbury, MD	Washington	16–6
11	April 19, 1986	Chestertown, MD	Washington	16–7
12	May 7, 1986	Geneva, NY	Washington	24–4
13	April 18, 1987	Salisbury, MD	Washington	18–7
14	April 9, 1988	Chestertown, MD	Washington	14–6
15	April 29, 1989	Salisbury, MD	Washington	13–8
16	April 28, 1990	Chestertown, MD	Washington	14–12
17	April 27, 1991	Salisbury, MD	Salisbury	20–4
18	April 25, 1992	Chestertown, MD	Salisbury	22–8
19	April 24, 1993	Salisbury, MD	Salisbury	17–5
20	May 16, 1993	College Park, MD	Washington	12–11
21	April 23, 1994	Chestertown, MD	Salisbury	13–8
22	May 15, 1994	College Park, MD	Salisbury	24–6
23	April 22, 1995	Salisbury, MD	Salisbury	21–8
24	April 20, 1996	Chestertown, MD	Salisbury	23–11
25	May 18, 1996	College Park, MD	Washington	11–10
26	April 19, 1997	Salisbury, MD	Salisbury	16–5
27	April 18, 1998	Salisbury, MD	Salisbury	24–11
28	May 17, 1998	New Brunswick, NJ	Washington	12–10
29	May 1, 1999	Chestertown, MD	Salisbury	16–15
30	April 29, 2000	Salisbury, MD	Washington	15–10

No.	Date	Location	Winner	Score
31	May 14, 2000	Salisbury, MD	Salisbury	21–9
32	May 5, 2001	Chestertown, MD	Salisbury	8–7
33	May 4, 2002	Salisbury, MD	Washington	14–10
34	May 3, 2003	Chestertown, MD	Salisbury	17–12
35	May 1, 2004	Salisbury, MD	Salisbury	21–7
36	May 23, 2004	Salisbury, MD	Salisbury	13–11
37	April 30, 2005	Chestertown, MD	Salisbury	11–10
38	April 29, 2006	Baltimore, MD	Salisbury	13–7
39	May 17, 2006	Salisbury, MD	Salisbury	8–4
40	April 28, 2007	Chestertown, MD	Salisbury	13–5
41	April 26, 2008	Salisbury, MD	Salisbury	15–11
42	April 25, 2009	Chestertown, MD	Salisbury	12–11
43	May 8, 2010	Salisbury, MD	Salisbury	12–7
44	May 7, 2011	Chestertown, MD	#1 Salisbury	17–3
45	April 21, 2012	Salisbury, MD	#1 Salisbury	17–5
46	April 17, 2013	Chestertown, MD	#12 Washington	7–6
47	March 19, 2014	Salisbury, MD	#2 Salisbury	12–7
48	May 18, 2014	Salisbury, MD	#2 Salisbury	13–8
49	April 18, 2015	Chestertown, MD	#10 Salisbury	23–5
50	March 16, 2016	Salisbury, MD	#2 Salisbury	14–2
51	March 11, 2017	Chestertown, MD	#1 Salisbury	14–1
52	March 17, 2018	Salisbury, MD	#8 Salisbury	7–6
53	April 13, 2019	Chestertown, MD	#1 Salisbury	15–14^{2OT}
54	April 9, 2022	Salisbury, MD	#1 Salisbury	22–8
55	April 15, 2023	Chestertown, MD	#2 Salisbury	23–9
56	April 13, 2024	Salisbury, MD	#1 Salisbury	12–7
57	April 25, 2025	Chestertown, MD	#2 Salisbury	20–6
58	April 24, 2026	Salisbury, MD	#7 Salisbury	6–4
Series: Salisbury leads 38–20
