= 2016 NCAA Division III men's lacrosse tournament =

Lacrosse Championship

2016 NCAA Division III Men's Lacrosse Championship
Tournament information
- Sport: College lacrosse
- Location: United States
- Dates: May 11, 2016–May 29, 2016
- Venue(s): Lincoln Financial Field; Philadelphia, PA
- Participants: 32

Tournament statistics
- Matches played: 31

The 2016 NCAA Division III men's lacrosse tournament was the 37th annual single-elimination tournament to determine the national champion of NCAA Division III men's college lacrosse in the United States. The championship was played at Lincoln Financial Field in Philadelphia, Pennsylvania on May 29, 2016. All other rounds were played at campus sites, at the home field of the higher-seeded team, from May 11 to May 22.

== Qualification ==
All Division III men's lacrosse programs were eligible for this championship. A total of 32 teams were invited, with programs receiving bids through one of three methods (or "Pools").

- Pool A: Twenty-three (23) teams received automatic bids by winning their conference's post-season tournament

Conference	Champion	Record
Capital	York (PA)	16–3
Centennial	Gettysburg	14–2
CSAC	Cabrini	14–4
Empire 8	Ithaca	18–1
Great Northeast	Emmanuel	11–8
Landmark	Catholic	11–6
Liberty	RIT	17–1
Little East	Keene State	14–3
MIAA	Albion	13–4
MAC Commonwealth	Stevenson	15–4
MAC Freedom	Eastern	14–5
MLC	Aurora	16–2
NESCAC	Tufts	16–2
NEWMAC	Springfield	11–7
NAC	New England College	13–6
NCAC	Denison	16–1
NEAC	Morrisville State	13–2
OAC	John Carroll	12–5
ODAC	Washington & Lee	15–3
Skyline	Montclair State	12–6
SAA	Sewanee	12–3
SUNYAC	SUNY Cortland	13–5

- Pool B: Three (3) bids were awarded to three teams that either independents or are in conferences that do not sponsor post-season tournaments

Team	Record
Carthage	9–9
Colorado College	11–4
Whittier	8–5

- Pool C: Six (6) at-large bids were to awarded to teams that did not win their conference's bid (tournament or non-tournament)

Team	Record
Amherst	12–4
Middlebury	12–6
Lynchburg	12–8
Rensselaer	13–4
Salisbury	18–1
St. Lawrence	15–2

== Bracket ==
First Round; May 11, 2016
*	RIT	29
John Carroll	6
*	Rensselaer	11
Amherst	16
*	Middlebury	10
Springfield	11***
*	St. Lawrence	25
New England College	2
*	Ithaca	24
Morrisville State	7
*	Keene State	7
Montclair State	10
*	Western New England	5
SUNY Cortland	13
*	Tufts	25
Emmanuel	5
*	Salisbury	19
Catholic	6
*	Colorado College	11*
Whittier	10
*	Albion	11
Aurora	12*
*	Denison	19
Carthage	2
*	Gettysburg	8
Lynchburg	7
*	Stevenson	10
Cabrini	15
*	Washington & Lee	9
Sewanee	5
*	York (PA)	11
Eastern	6

Second Round; May 14, 2016
*	RIT	14
Amherst	17
Springfield	9
*	St. Lawrence	12
*	Ithaca	11
Montclair State	8
SUNY Cortland	6
*	Tufts	19
*	Salisbury	16
Colorado College	5
Aurora	3
*	Denison	12
*	Gettysburg	11
Cabrini	10
Washington & Lee	5
*	York (PA)	12

Quarterfinals; May 18, 2016
Amherst	12
*	St. Lawrence	16
Ithaca	7
*	Tufts	19
*	Salisbury	11*
Denison	10
Gettysburg	7*
*	York (PA)	6

Semifinals; May 22, 2016
St. Lawrence	12
*	Tufts	23
*	Salisbury	14
Gettysburg	6

Championship; May 29, 2016
*	Tufts	13
*	Salisbury	14

- Note: An asterisk marks the host team
