= 1980 NCAA Division III lacrosse tournament =

American collegiate lacrosse tournament

1980 NCAA Division III Lacrosse Championship
Tournament information
- Sport: College lacrosse
- Location: (New York (state)) Geneva, New York (final)
- Host: Hobart and William Smith Colleges (final)
- Venue: Boswell Field (final)
- Participants: 8

Final positions
- Champions: Hobart (1st title)
- Runner-up: Cortland (1st title game)

Tournament statistics
- Matches played: 11
- Goals scored: 180 (16.36 per match)
- Attendance: 8,901 (809 per match)
- MVP: Mark Darcangelo, Hobart
- Top scorer(s): Scott Petosa, Hobart (17)

The 1980 NCAA Division III Lacrosse Championship was the inaugural single-elimination tournament to determine the national champions of NCAA Division III men's college lacrosse in the United States.

This was the first championship exclusively for Division III men's lacrosse programs, who previously competed in a combined-format Division II championship from 1974 to 1979.

The tournament field included eight times, with the final played at Boswell Field at the Hobart and William Smith Colleges in Geneva, New York.

Hosts Hobart defeated Cortland in the final, 11–8, to win their first Division III national title. The Statesmen (12–2) were coached by Dave Urick. Hobart had previously won two national titles at the Division II level (1976 and 1977).

== Bracket ==
Quarterfinals
Hobart | 37
MIT | 1
Salisbury State | 15
St. Lawrence | 11
Cortland | 13
Ohio Wesleyan | 9
Ithaca | 15*
Washington College | 14

Semifinals
Hobart | 21
Salisbury State | 5
Cortland | 11
Ithaca | 9

Championship
Hobart | 11
Cortland | 8

== See also ==
- 1980 NCAA Division I Lacrosse Championship
- 1980 NCAA Division II Lacrosse Championship
