= 1980 NCAA Division II lacrosse tournament =

1980 NCAA Division II Lacrosse Championship
Tournament information
- Sport: College lacrosse
- Location: Catonsville, Maryland
- Host(s): University of Maryland, Baltimore County
- Venue(s): UMBC Stadium
- Participants: 2

Final positions
- Champions: UMBC (1st title)
- Runner-up: Adelphi (2nd title game)

Tournament statistics
- Matches played: 1
- Goals scored: 37 (37 per match)
- Attendance: 834 (834 per match)
- Top scorer(s): Jay Robertson, UMBC (8)

The 1980 NCAA Division II Lacrosse Championship was the seventh annual single-elimination tournament to determine the national champions of NCAA Division II men's college lacrosse in the United States.

This was the first tournament exclusively for Division II men's programs following the introduction of a separate Division III men's championship. With the exodus of programs, the tournament field decreased from twelve to just two.

The final, and only match of the tournament, was played at UMBC Stadium at the University of Maryland, Baltimore County in Catonsville, Maryland.

In a rematch of the previous year's final, hosts UMBC defeated defending champions Adelphi, 23–14, to win their first national title. The Retrievers (11–3) were coached by Dick Watts.

== Bracket ==
Championship
UMBC	23
Adelphi	14

== See also ==
- 1980 NCAA Division I Lacrosse Championship
- 1980 NCAA Division III Lacrosse Championship (inaugural edition)
