= Coastal Lacrosse Conference =

NCAA Division III intercollegiate athletic conference

- Association: NCAA
- Founded: 2022
- Sports fielded: 1 (men's lacrosse)
- Division: Division III
- No. of teams: 6 (4 in 2026)
- Region: Mid-Atlantic
- Official website: coastallaxconference.com

Locations
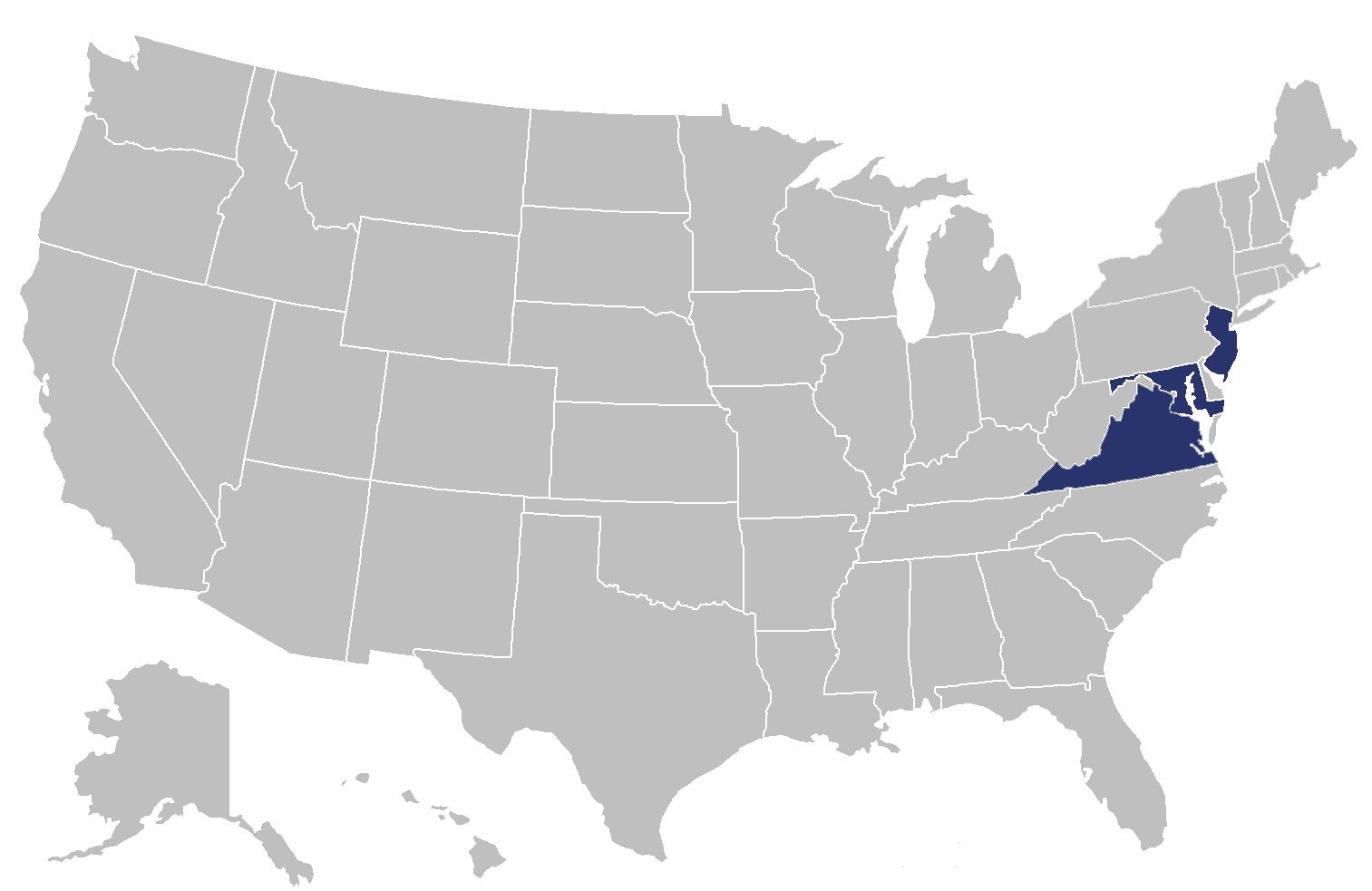

The Coastal Lacrosse Conference (CLC) is a single-sport intercollegiate athletic conference affiliated with the NCAA's Division III. The conference was formed between members of the Coast to Coast Athletic Conference and New Jersey Athletic Conference. Member institutions are located on the east coast in the states of Maryland, New Jersey, North Carolina and Virginia.

== History ==
The Coastal Lacrosse Conference was formed in 2022, the charter members were Christopher Newport University, Kean University, University of Mary Washington, Montclair State University, Salisbury University, and Stockton University. The conference will not receive automatic bids to the NCAA Division III Men's Lacrosse Championship until the 2025 season (2024-25 school year).

In 2024 (2023–24 season), Warren Wilson College joined the CLC.

After the 2024–25 season, Montclair State University left the CLC.

After the 2025-26 season, Kean University and Stockton University will leave the CLC since their primary conference (NJAC) will start to sponsor the sport in the 2026–27 season.

== Member institutions ==
=== Current members ===
| Institution | Location | Founded | Affiliation | Enrollment | Nickname | Joined | Primary Conference |
|---|---|---|---|---|---|---|---|
| Christopher Newport University | Newport News, Virginia | 1961 | Public | 5,186 | Captains | 2022–23 | C2C |
| Kean University | Union, New Jersey | 1855 | Public | 15,000 | Cougars | 2022–23 | NJAC |
| University of Mary Washington | Fredericksburg, Virginia | 1908 | Public | 4,862 | Eagles | 2022–23 | C2C |
| Salisbury University | Salisbury, Maryland | 1925 | Public | 7,383 | Sea Gulls | 2022–23 | C2C |
| Stockton University | Pomona, New Jersey | 1969 | Public | 7,450 | Ospreys | 2022–23 | NJAC |
| Warren Wilson College | Swannanoa, North Carolina | 1894 | Presbyterian (PCUSA) | 650 | Owls | 2023–24 | C2C |

=== Former members ===
| Institution | Location | Founded | Affiliation | Enrollment | Nickname | Joined | Departed | Primary Conference |
|---|---|---|---|---|---|---|---|---|
| Montclair State University | Upper Montclair, New Jersey | 1908 | Public | 16,660 | Red Hawks | 2022–23 | 2024–25 | NJAC |
