= Jack Emmer =

American lacrosse coach

Biographical details
- Born: Mineola, New York, U.S.

Playing career
- 1965–1967: Rutgers
- Positions: Defenseman (lacrosse); Wide receiver (football)

Coaching career (HC unless noted)
- 1970–1972: Cortland State
- 1973–1983: Washington and Lee
- 1984–2005: Army

Head coaching record
- Overall: 326–184

Accomplishments and honors

Championships

Awards
- As coach: 1974 F. Morris Touchstone Award; 1992 Patriot League Coach of the Year; 1998 Patriot League Coach of the Year; 2003 Howdy Myers Man of the Year Award; 2005 National Lacrosse Hall of Fame; As player: All-American second team; First-team All-East (1966)

John S. Emmer is a former American lacrosse coach. He retired in 2005 with 326 wins, making him the lacrosse coach with the most wins in NCAA history. This mark was surpassed in 2008 by Jim Berkman of Division III Salisbury University. Emmer is one of only two head coaches to have led three different teams to the NCAA men's lacrosse tournament.

== Early life ==
Emmer grew up in Mineola, New York and attended Rutgers University, where he played football as a wide receiver and lacrosse as a defenseman. He lettered in lacrosse three times from 1965 to 1967. The United States Intercollegiate Lacrosse Association named him to the All-American second team. He was voted most valuable player by his teammates and made an appearance in the North-South Senior All-Star Game upon the end of his college career in 1967. Emmer was selected in the 13th round of the 1967 NFL/AFL draft as the 327th overall pick by the New York Jets. Emmer played professional football in the minor league Atlantic Coast Football League, playing for the Westchester Bulls in 1967 and 1968.

== Coaching career ==
In 1970, Emmer received his first head coaching position at Cortland State. During his three-year tenure there, he posted a 32–6 record and led the Red Dragons to an appearance in the recently established NCAA tournament in 1972.

In 1973, Emmer took over as head coach at Washington and Lee. He led the Generals to six-straight NCAA tournament appearances between 1973 and 1978. In 1973, Washington and Lee finished the regular season with a perfect 14-win mark. The Generals defeated Navy in overtime, 13–12, to advance to the semifinals, where they were beaten, 18–5, by Maryland. The Generals again finished 1974 undefeated with a 15–0 record, and received a bid to the NCAA tournament. In the first round, they beat Navy, 11–9, before being eliminated in the semi-finals by Johns Hopkins, 11–10. In the 1975 NCAA tournament, Washington and Lee beat Hopkins, 11–7, at Homewood Field to end the Blue Jays' 27-game home winning streak. The Generals then fell to Maryland, 15–5, in the semifinals. In total, Emmer led Washington and Lee to ten NCAA tournaments.

In 1984, he moved to the United States Military Academy to take over the Army lacrosse team. At West Point, he led the Black Knights to eight NCAA tournament appearances, which set a school record for a head coach. He also became one of the only two head coaches to lead three different teams to the NCAA semifinals. Under Emmer, Army won ten outright or shared Patriot League conference championships, including five straight from 1991 to 1995, over which period the Black Knights posted a perfect 25–0 conference record. In all, Emmer recorded a 70–12 Patriot League mark. Emmer was named the Patriot League Coach of the Year in 1992 and 1998. In 2002, he coached an all-star collegiate United States national team to the gold medal in the World Lacrosse Championship in Perth, Australia. In 2003, Emmer broke the NCAA record for wins by a coach, and received the Howdy Myers Man of the Year Award. Emmer retired from coaching after the 2005 season in order to spend more time with his family in Skaneateles, New York.

Emmer was inducted into the National Lacrosse Hall of Fame in 2005. He has also been inducted into the Charlottesville, Hudson Valley, and Long Island Metro Area US Lacrosse chapters Halls of Fame.

== Personal life ==
Emmer and his wife, Joan, have two children, a son and daughter. His son, Patrick played midfielder at Bryant University under head coach Mike Pressler, who played for Emmer at Washington & Lee.
