= 1972 NCAA lacrosse tournament =

1972 NCAA Division I men's lacrosse tournament
- Dates: May 20–June 3, 1972
- Teams: 8
- Finals site: Byrd Stadium; College Park, Maryland
- Champions: Virginia (1st title)
- Runner-up: Johns Hopkins (1st title game)
- Semifinalists: Cortland State (1st Final Four); Maryland (2nd Final Four)
- Winning coach: Glenn Thiel (1st title)
- MOP: Jay Connor, Virginia
- Attendance: 7,001 finals
- Top scorer: Jay Connor, Virginia (13 goals)

The 1972 NCAA lacrosse tournament was the second annual tournament hosted by the National Collegiate Athletic Association to determine the team champion of college lacrosse among its members in the United States.

This was the last NCAA championship in which the Wingate Memorial Trophy was also presented to the national champion. Prior to NCAA Lacrosse Championships, the United States Intercollegiate Lacrosse Association (USILA) awarded the Wingate Memorial Trophy to the NCAA annual champion based on regular season records.

Virginia, led by coach Glenn Thiel, defeated Johns Hopkins in the championship game, 13–12. The victory gave Virginia its first NCAA championship in lacrosse and its third overall (including USILA titles in 1952 and 1970). The victory also gave Virginia its first official NCAA national title in any sport.

The championship game was played at Byrd Stadium at the University of Maryland in front of a crowd of 7,001 fans.

== Overview ==
As in 1971, teams were first selected from the college lacrosse divisions, and then at-large teams were chosen. Army, Navy, Maryland and Johns Hopkins were selected as "seeded" picks. And Virginia, Cortland, Rutgers and Washington & Lee were picked as the at-large teams.

Virginia had USILA player of the year Pete Eldredge, who finished with four goals in the finals scoring the game winner with four minutes left in the fourth quarter. The Cavaliers had lost to Hopkins, Maryland and Navy during the regular season.

Maryland, the pre-tournament favorite and host team, fell in the semifinals to Johns Hopkins, 9–6, before 7,000 fans.

The Cavaliers survived a late rush by Jack Thomas, who with 12 seconds left in the game appeared to have a clear shot at the net. Bob Scott however had, unknown to the ball players called a timeout, negating what would have been a last-second game-tying attempt. Virginia twice had a three-goal lead in this game, only to see Hopkins tie the score. Once UVA took its final lead, they were able to play ball control for the final four minutes of the game, except for the final Hopkins try at the end, aided by 4 Hopkins penalties. Hopkins got the ball back with 41 seconds left for that final rush to goal by Thomas. Hopkins was able to get one final shot off as the gun sounded, but the shot hit a defenseman. UVA held Thomas in relative check with Thomas ending the game with 2 goals and 1 assist.

This tournament saw the entry in the tournament of two early innovative lacrosse programs, Cortland State and Washington and Lee. Cortland was notable for going 14-2 that season while knocking off defending champion Cornell, Syracuse and Navy, and earning the number 3 seed in the tournament. Cortland was coached by Jack Emmer who later took Washington and Lee to consecutive NCAAs before moving on to be the longtime coach at Army.

Paced by veterans Jay Connor, Tom Duquette, Pete Eldredge and Chip Barker as well as freshman Richie Werner, Virginia got the winning goal from Eldredge, unassisted with 4:11 left in the contest. Maryland, the pre-tourney favorite, fell in the semifinals to Johns Hopkins 9–6. Connor, the tourney's leading scorer, set a meet record for assists. Maryland's John Kaestner broke the single-game assist mark. Virginia and Johns Hopkins combined to shatter all three of the tournament records for shots on goal.

In the first round, Jack Emmer's Cortland team edged Navy 10 to 9 in double overtime, led by Paul Wehrum's 3 goals. Cortland scored three goals in the fourth quarter to erase a 9–6 deficit and won the game despite being outshot by Navy 57–28.

== Bracket ==
Quarterfinals; May 20
1	Maryland (8-1)	9
8	Rutgers (9-3)	3
4	Johns Hopkins (9-1)	11
5	Washington and Lee (12-2)	5
3	Cortland State (13-1)	10^{(ii)}
6	Navy (8-3)	9
2	Virginia (8-4)	10
7	Army (8-2)	7

Semifinals; May 27
1	Maryland	6
4	Johns Hopkins	9
3	Cortland State	7
2	Virginia	14

Championship; June 3
4	Johns Hopkins (11–2)	12
2	Virginia (11–4)	13

- ^{(ii)} two overtimes

== Box scores ==
=== Finals ===
Team	1	2	3	4	Total
Virginia (11–4)	4	3	1	5	13
Johns Hopkins (11–2)	3	2	4	3	12
Virginia scoring – Pete Eldredge 4, Richie Werner 3, Chip Barker 3, Tom Duquette 2, Jay Connor; Johns Hopkins scoring – Bill Nolan 4, Gary Handleman 2, Jack Thomas 2, Don Krohn 2, Richard Kowalchuk, Pat Sinram; Shots: Virginia 44, Johns Hopkins 33; Saves: Virginia 13, Johns Hopkins 10

=== Semifinals ===
Team	1	2	3	4	Total
Virginia	2	5	4	3	14
Cortland State (14–2)	1	1	2	3	7
Virginia scoring – Jay Connor 3, Pete Eldredge 3, Richie Werner 3, Tom Duquette, Chip Barker, Jim Ulman, George Turner, Doug Cooper; Cortland St. scoring – Paul Wehrum 3, John Eberenz 2, Bert Severns, Ken McEwan; Shots: Virginia 59, Cortland St. 31

Team	1	2	3	4	Total
Johns Hopkins	3	1	4	1	9
Maryland	1	3	2	0	6
Johns Hopkins scoring – Bill Nolan 2, Jack Thomas 2, Kenneth Winegrad, Gary Handleman, Richard Kowalchuk, Mike Perez, William McCutcheon; Maryland scoring – John Kaestner 3, Dave Dempsey 2, Pat O’Meally; Shots: Maryland 38, Johns Hopkins 34

=== Quarterfinals ===
Team	1	2	3	4	Total
Maryland	1	3	3	2	9
Rutgers	0	0	0	3	3
Maryland scoring – Ed Mullen 3, Brooks Sleeper 3 Larry Hubbard, Dino Mattesich, Pat O’Meally, Dave Dempsey; Rutgers scoring – Randy Bornoff, Mike Rinck, Bob Carney; Shots: Maryland 39, Rutgers 23

Team	1	2	3	4	Total
Johns Hopkins	2	3	5	1	11
Washington and Lee	2	0	1	2	5
Johns Hopkins scoring – Bill Nolan 3, Gary Handleman 2, Pat Sinram, Paul Edwards, Mike Perez, Kenneth Winegrad, Don Krohn, Eric Bergofsky; Wash. & Lee scoring – Sam Englehart 2, Dave Warfield, Skip Lichtfuss, Brian Chasney; Shots: Johns Hopkins 68, Wash. & Lee 34

Team	1	2	3	4	Total
Virginia	3	3	2	2	10
Army	2	0	1	0	3
Virginia scoring – Tom Duquette 3, Chip Barker 3, Doug Cooper 2, Pete Eldredge, Rick Beach; Army scoring – Russ Bolling, Rick Goodhand, Phil Lynch; Shots: Virginia 51, Army 37

Team	1	2	3	4	OT1	OT2	Total
Cortland State	0	4	2	3	1	0	10
Navy	4	1	4	0	0	0	9
Cortland St. scoring – Paul Wehrum 3, Bert Severns 2, John Eberenz 2, Ken McEwan 2, Sal Taormina; Navy scoring – Dave Bayly 2, Nick Smilari 2, Chris Virtue, Chris Ladd, Marty Mason, Tim Supko, Kim McCauley; Shots: Navy 57, Cortland St. 28

== Outstanding player ==
- Jay Connor, Virginia, 13 points, Tournament Leading Scorer

The NCAA did not designate a Most Outstanding Player until the 1977 national tournament.
The Tournament outstanding player listed here is the tournament leading scorer.
