= 1981 NCAA Division I men's lacrosse tournament =

- Dates: May 20–30, 1981
- Teams: 8
- Finals site: Palmer Stadium; Princeton, New Jersey
- Champions: North Carolina (1st title)
- Runner-up: Johns Hopkins (8th title game)
- Semifinalists: Navy (7th Final Four); Virginia (5th Final Four)
- Winning coach: Willie Scroggs (1st title)
- MOP: Jeff Cook, Attack, Johns Hopkins
- Attendance: 13,943 finals 29,387 total
- Top scorer: Mike Burnett, North Carolina (15 goals)

The 1981 NCAA Division I lacrosse tournament was the 11th annual tournament hosted by the National Collegiate Athletic Association to determine the team champion of men's college lacrosse among its Division I programs at the end of the 1981 NCAA Division I lacrosse season.

North Carolina capped off a 12-0 season with its first-ever NCAA championship, defeating undefeated three-time defending champion Johns Hopkins in the final, 14–13.

The championship game was played at Palmer Stadium at Princeton University in Princeton, New Jersey on May 30, with a crowd of 13,943 fans in attendance.

== Overview ==
North Carolina scored five goals in the fourth quarter to defeat Johns Hopkins in a come-from-behind victory, coming back from a three-goal deficit. Hopkins had finished first or second in eight of the 11 NCAA championships and had been on a 22-game unbeaten streak before the final. This title was North Carolina's first in lacrosse.

The Tar Heels were led by coach Willie Scroggs, former Johns Hopkins' top assistant coach. North Carolina had been ranked number two in the USILA poll behind three-time defending national champion Johns Hopkins entering the tournament. Scroggs, who played midfield at Hopkins, turned the Tar Heels into national champions after only three seasons as coach.

Annapolis native Michael Burnett was selected USILA first team All-America. North Carolina's leading scorer, Burnett a sophomore, was among the first of a group of high-profile Maryland players recruited by Willie Scroggs to North Carolina as the school quickly built its program into a national power. Over the next decade, North Carolina would be among the top lacrosse programs, with four national titles and nine Final Four appearances.

For Hopkins, the prior four-year period included 53 wins against three losses, to go with three national championships. During this stretch, the Blue Jays won a record 11 straight NCAA tournament games, a record later tied by Syracuse.

National Player of the Year Jeff Cook scored six goals for Hopkins. Cook got Hopkins to within one goal with 45 seconds left in the game on a tremendous individual effort, stick-handling past four UNC defenders and rocketing a shot past the goaltender. Hopkins, though, lost the ensuing final face-off.

== Bracket ==
First Round; May 20
1	Johns Hopkins	19
8	Maryland	14
5	Virginia	16
4	Massachusetts	12
2	North Carolina	13
7	Syracuse	6
6	Navy	16
3	Army	10

Semifinals; May 23
1	Johns Hopkins	10
5	Virginia	6
2	North Carolina	17
6	Navy	8

Championship; May 30
1	Johns Hopkins (13–1)	13
2	North Carolina (12–0)	14

== Box scores ==
=== Finals ===
- May 30, 1981

Team	1	2	3	4	Total
North Carolina (12–0)	4	3	2	5	14
Johns Hopkins (13–1)	5	3	3	2	13
North Carolina scoring – Mike Burnett 4, Doug Hall 3, Kevin Griswold 2, Chris Mueller, Monty Hill, Dave Wingate, Pete Voelkel, Jeff Homire; Johns Hopkins scoring – Jeff Cook 6, Brendan Schneck 2, Jim Zaffuto, Bill Cantelli, Jeff Kendall, Jeff Harris, Mike Donnelly; Shots: Johns Hopkins 48, North Carolina 44; Saves: North Carolina 18, Johns Hopkins 17

=== Semifinals ===
- May 23, 1981

Team	1	2	3	4	Total
Johns Hopkins	1	4	2	3	10
Virginia	3	2	0	1	6
Johns Hopkins scoring – Brendan Schneck 3, Jim Zaffuto 2, Jeff Cook, Jeff Harris, Peter Scott, Henry Ciccarone, Bill Cantelli.; Virginia scoring – Bill Seery, Mike Caravana, Rick Giusto, Matt Rainis, Randy Natoli, Lou Ruland.; Shots: Johns Hopkins 49, Virginia 35.

Team	1	2	3	4	Total
Navy	3	2	1	2	8
North Carolina	4	1	3	9	17
Navy scoring – Syd Abernethy 4, Rich Wehman, Phil Skalniak, Chuck Coughlin, Mike Gubosh.; North Carolina scoring – Monty Hill 4, Jeff Homire 3, Mike Burnett 3, Pete Voelkel 2, Andy Smith, Kevin Griswold, Doug Hall, Terry Martinello, Tim Voelkel.; Shots: Navy 49, North Carolina 45.

=== First round ===
Team	1	2	3	4	Total
Johns Hopkins	8	2	2	7	19
Maryland	3	5	3	3	14
Johns Hopkins scoring – Jim Zaffuto 6, Jeff Harris 3, Joe Ciletti 2, Bill Cantelli 2, Jeff Cook, Peter Scott, Brendan Schneck, Henry Ciccarone, Mike McGee, Howard Offit.; Maryland scoring – James Wilkerson 5, Pete Worstell 3, Thomas Lloyd, David Saunders, Timothy Worstell, Ron Martinello, Klay Johnson, Jack Francis.; Shots: Johns Hopkins 51, Maryland 48

Team	1	2	3	4	Total
Virginia	5	2	6	3	16
Massachusetts	3	1	2	6	12
Virginia scoring – Randy Natoli 5, Rick Giusto 4, Ray Giusto, Matt Rainis, Lou Ruland, Tim O’Shea, Bill Seery, David Willis, Pat Finn; Massachusetts scoring – Jim Welter 2, Ernie Shapiro 2, Lee Vosburgh 2, Peter Schmitz, Karl Hatton, Chris Corin, Morgan Mohrman, Mike Lavin, Brian Kaley; Shots: Virginia 59, Massachusetts 40

Team	1	2	3	4	Total
North Carolina	3	4	1	5	13
Syracuse	2	2	2	0	6
North Carolina scoring – Jeff Homire 3, Kevin Griswold 2, Michael Burnett 2, John Basil, Tom Federico, Monty Hill, Doug Hall, Terry Martinello, Dan Aburn; Syracuse scoring – Jim Booth 2, Tom Donahue, Greg Tarbell, Rob Floyd, Ralph Spinola; Shots: North Carolina 38, Syracuse 29

Team	1	2	3	4	Total
Navy	3	4	4	5	16
Army	4	3	2	1	10
Navy scoring – Bill Anderson 4, Syd Abernethy 3, Phil Skalniak 2, Rich Wehman 2, Bob Bianchi, Jim Bianchi, David Jones, Mike Gubosh, Bob Sturgell; Army scoring – Mark Albe 3, Frank Giordano 3, Paul Cino 2, Ken Dahl, Steve Krikorian; Shots: Navy 59, Army 41

== Outstanding players ==
- Jeff Cook, Attack, Johns Hopkins, tournament Most Outstanding Player

=== Leading scorers ===
Name	GP	G	A	Pts
Mike Burnett, North Carolina	3	9	6	15
Jeff Cook, Johns Hopkins	3	8	4	12
Syd Abernathy, Navy	2	7	3	10
Brendan Schneck, Johns Hopkins	3	6	4	10
Jim Zaffuto, Johns Hopkins	3	9	0	9
Jeff Homire, North Carolina	3	7	1	8
Doug Hall, North Carolina	3	5	3	8
Pete Voelkel, North Carolina	3	3	5	8
Kevin Griswold, North Carolina	3	5	2	7
Randy Natoli, Virginia	2	6	1	7

== See also ==
- 1981 NCAA Division II lacrosse tournament
- 1981 NCAA Division III lacrosse tournament
