= 1981 NCAA Division II lacrosse tournament =

1981 NCAA Division II Lacrosse Championship
Tournament information
- Sport: College lacrosse
- Location: (New York (state)) Garden City, New York
- Host(s): Adelphi University
- Venue(s): Motamed Field
- Participants: 2

Final positions
- Champions: Adelphi (2nd title)
- Runner-up: Loyola (MD) (1st title game)

Tournament statistics
- Matches played: 1
- Goals scored: 31 (31 per match)
- Attendance: 820 (820 per match)
- Top scorer(s): Ed Hughes, Adelphi (8)

The 1981 NCAA Division II Lacrosse Championship was the eighth annual single-elimination tournament to determine the national champions of NCAA Division II men's college lacrosse in the United States.

This would be the final edition of the Division II men's tournament until 1993.

The final, and only match of the tournament, was played at Motamed Field at Adelphi University in Garden City, New York.

Hosts Adelphi defeated Loyola (MD), 17–14, to win their second national title. Paul Doherty coached the Panthers (10–2). This was Adelphi's second title in three seasons.

== Bracket ==
Championship
Adelphi	17
Loyola (MD)	14

== See also ==
- 1981 NCAA Division I Lacrosse Championship
- 1981 NCAA Division III Lacrosse Championship
