= Mary Washington Eagles =

- University: University of Mary Washington
- Nickname: Eagles
- NCAA: Division III
- Conference: C2C (primary); Coastal Lacrosse Conference (men's lacrosse); CFHC (Note: Initials for "Collegiate Field Hockey Conference") (field hockey)
- Athletic director: Patrick Catullo
- Location: Fredericksburg, Virginia
- Varsity teams: 20 (11 men's, 13 women's)
- Basketball arena: William M. Anderson Center
- Baseball stadium: V. Earl Dickinson Stadium
- Soccer stadium: Grass Stadium
- Volleyball arena: William M. Anderson Center
- Other venues: Goolrick Hall; Turf Stadium
- Colors: Navy Blue, Light Blue, and White
- Mascot: Sammy "D" Eagle
- Fight song: "Soar, Eagle Nation, Soar!"
- Website: umweagles.com
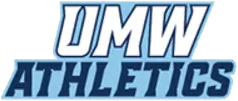

The Mary Washington Eagles are the athletic teams that represent the University of Mary Washington, located in Fredericksburg, Virginia, in NCAA Division III intercollegiate sports. The Eagles compete as members of the Coast to Coast Athletic Conference (C2C; known as the Capital Athletic Conference before November 2020). All together, Mary Washington sponsors 24 sports: eleven for men and thirteen for women.

== History ==
As of 2024, the Eagles have had more than 200 student-athletes achieve All-American status. Five UMW teams have won four national championships (1982 AIAW champion women's tennis, 1988 NCAA Division III women's tennis, 1991 NCAA Division III women's tennis, 2017 USA Rugby Men's Division 1AA Fall National Championship, 2026 NCAA Division III men's basketball).

== Varsity sports ==
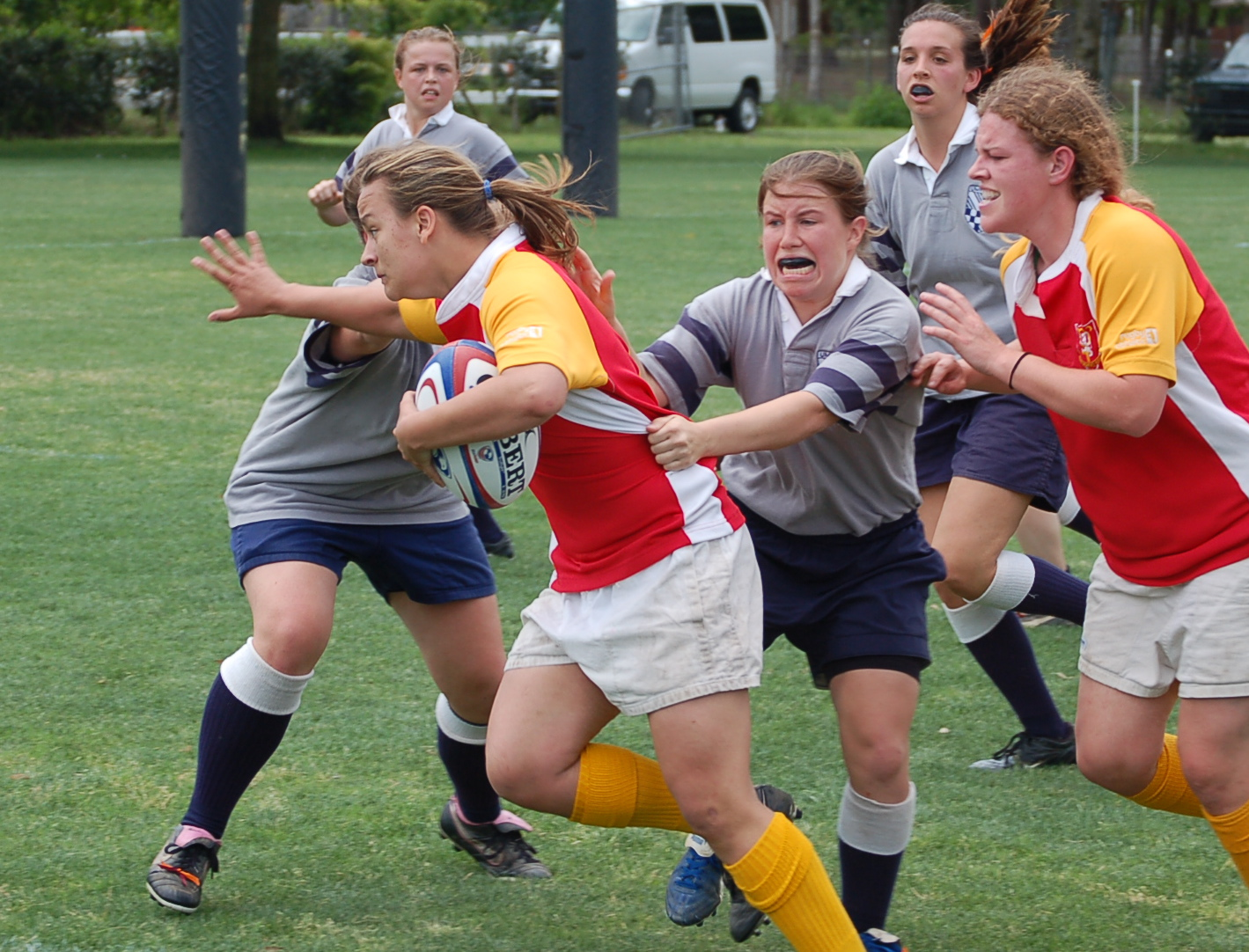
UMW women's rugby vs. Iowa State in 2007

Men's sports	Women's sports
Baseball	Softball
Basketball	Basketball
Cross country	Cross country
Equestrian	Equestrian
Esports	Esports
Lacrosse	Lacrosse
Rugby union	Rugby union
Soccer	Soccer
Swimming	Swimming
Tennis	Tennis
Track and field	Track and field
	Field Hockey
	Volleyball

=== Baseball ===
The baseball team has won 10 total CAC/C2C Conference championships since its inaugural season in 1988. The Eagles have appeared in 12 NCAA Tournaments.

=== Men's Basketball ===
Mary Washington's men's basketball advanced to the national quarterfinals in 2014 under the tutelage of long time head coach Rod Wood. The Eagles have three NCAA Tournament appearances and a pair of CAC/C2C championships. In 2026, the UMW Eagles defeated Emory to clinch their first NCAA Division III Men's Basketball Championship under head coach Marcus Kahn.

=== Women's basketball ===
The women's basketball team has advanced to three straight Sweet 16s, including a third-place finish at the 2007 Final Four. A year later, the Eagles were ranked as high as No. 1 in the country. In 2016 the women's team advanced again to the 1st round of the NCAA Tournament after winning the Capital Athletic Conference Championship. The Eagles have appeared in the NCAA Tournament 12 times with five CAC/C2C championships.

Liz Hickey is the lone student-athlete to have her jersey retired by the school. At the time of her departure, Hickey left as the NCAA Div. III all-time leader in blocked shots with 509.

=== Field hockey ===
The UMW field hockey team advanced to the National Championship in 1993 and the Final Four in 2012. In its history, the Eagles have four CAC/C2C championships and nine NCAA ˇTournament appearances. On April 4, 2024, the Eagles announced that they would be leaving the Coast-to-Coast Conference and join the newly-formed Collegiate Field Hockey Conference.

=== Men's lacrosse ===
The men's lacrosse team has appeared in the NCAA Tournament once, coming in 2014.

=== Women's lacrosse ===
The women's lacrosse team is, historically, one of UMW's best programs with numerous Top 5 rankings over the years. The Eagles have one CAC/C2C Championship and 14 NCAA Tournament appearances. The Eagles have made it to the third round of the Tournament three times, the most recent time in 2018.

=== Men's soccer ===
The UMW men's soccer team advanced to the 1997 & 2022 NCAA Final Four, and has 14 total NCAA Tournament appearances as of 2024. The Eagles have won 14 conference championships (13 of them being CAC/C2C), including their most recent one in 2023.

=== Women's soccer ===
The women's soccer team reached the NCAA Final Four in 1992 and has 14 NCAA Tournament appearances. The program also has won 14 CAC/C2C Conference championships.

=== Swimming ===
UMW's women's swimming team has won all 26 C2C Championships in the history of the conference, while the men's swim team has won 16 C2C Championships in a row with 21 out of 25 total belonging to the Eagles. The women's team boasts 39 All Americans and 17 Academic All Americans. One of which, Shannon Hutcherson, became the first Eagle in both men's and women's swimming to win a National Title in 1998. The men's team has boasted 11 All Americans and Academic All Americans. The program's most decorated athlete and UMW's most decorated athlete, Alex Anderson, won 4 national titles (2013 400 yard IM, 2014 400 yard IM and 200 yard Butterfly, 2015 200 yard Butterfly) and set 3 national records (2014 400 yard IM and 200 yard Butterfly, 2015 200 yard Butterfly) during his 4-year tenure at the program.

=== Tennis ===
The men's tennis team has advanced to 15 NCAA Tournaments, finishing in the top eight four times. The women's program has advanced to the second most NCAA tournaments in all of DIII women's tennis dating back to the 1990s.

=== Volleyball ===
The volleyball team has won two CAC/C2C Championships as well as well as seven NCAA Tournament appearances.

== Club Sports ==
=== Rowing ===
The University of Mary Washington Rowing team has garnered recognition. The crew team at the University of Mary Washington was created in 2007, where it had initially received varsity status. The status of the team as a varsity program was garnished in 2014, where it was demoted to a club sport. In the fall of 2015, it was announced that Crew along with the Mary Washington Rugby program would fall under the athletics category.

Falling under the category of athletics, this allows both men and women team a number of benefits. These benefits include; head coaches, access to athletic facilities, access to the varsity weight room, the ability to practice on varsity turf and an efficient budget. Discussions have been in the works with the crew teams and athletics about receiving varsity status in the near future.
