= 2009 NCAA Division III men's lacrosse tournament =

American collegiate lacrosse tournament

The 2009 NCAA Division III men's lacrosse tournament was held from May 9 through May 24, 2009. This was the 30th annual Division III NCAA Men's Lacrosse Championship tournament. Sixteen NCAA Division III college men's lacrosse teams met after having played their way through a regular season, and for some, a play-in game to advance to the tournament.

The tournament culminated with the finals, held on Memorial Day weekend at Gillette Stadium in Foxborough, Massachusetts. The championship weekend included the Division I and Division II championships.

== Play-in games ==
The final four rounds of the tournament were preceded by six play-in games on May 6:

- Springfield 21 – Mount Ida 4
- St. Lawrence 14 – Nazareth 7
- E. Connecticut 10 – USMMA 9
- Cabrini 17 – Montclair State 3
- Denison 12 – Ohio Wesleyan 2
- W&L 6 – FDU-Florham 5 *

== Tournament results ==
Second Round; May 9
N1	Cortland State	15
Springfield	12
N4	Tufts	9
W. New England	12
N3	Middlebury	15
N16	St. Lawrence	11
N2	Wesleyan	8
E. Connecticut	4
S1	Stevenson	8
S15	Cabrini	7
S5	Haverford	10
S4	Salisbury	16
S3	Roanoke	7
S14	Denison	14
S6	Washington & Lee	10
S2	Gettysburg	15

Quarterfinals; May 13
N1	Cortland State	6
W. New England	5
N3	Middlebury	13
N2	Wesleyan	5
S1	Stevenson	11
S4	Salisbury	9
S14	Denison	8
S2	Gettysburg	13

Semifinals; May 17
N1	Cortland State	16
N4	Middlebury	8
S1	Stevenson	7
S2	Gettysburg	12

Final; May 24
N1	Cortland State	9
S2	Gettysburg	7

- * = Overtime
