= 2008 NCAA Division III men's lacrosse tournament =

American collegiate lacrosse tournament

The 2008 NCAA Division III men's lacrosse tournament was held from May 10 through May 25, 2008. This was the 29th annual Division III NCAA Men's Lacrosse Championship tournament. Sixteen NCAA Division III college men's lacrosse teams met after having played their way through a regular season, and for some, a play-in game to advance to the tournament.

The tournament culminated with the finals held on Memorial Day weekend at Gillette Stadium in Foxborough, Massachusetts. The championship weekend, which included the Division I and Division II championships, was hosted by Harvard University and the Eastern College Athletic Conference. The game set an attendance record for the Division III title game of 24,317 fans.

The championship featured a third consecutive meeting between perennial powerhouses Cortland State Red Dragone and Salisbury Sea Gulls. The Sea Gulls victory sealed their 20th straight appearance, 26th overall in the NCAA Division III tournament, and capped of an undefeated season. They have a record of 45-18 all-time in the tournament and is a new Division III record beating Hobart's old record of 41.

== Play-in games ==
The final four rounds of the tournament were preceded by five play-in games on May 7:

- Springfield 17 – Kean 2
- Bowdoin 11 – Mount Ida 5
- Western New England 14 – Western Connecticut State 4
- Ohio Wesleyan 12 – Kenyon 8
- Denision 19 – Widener 6

== Tournament results ==
First Round; May 10
N1	Cortland St.	12
Springfield	9
N2	Middlebury	10
N11	Bowdoin	7
N4	Ithaca	17
N10	Williams	10
Western New England	13
N3	St. Lawrence	9
S1	Salisbury U.	13
Ohio Wesleyan	9
S4	Cabrini	13
S5	Haverford	10
S3	Washington (MD)	12
S6	Lynchburg	9
S10	Denison	7
S2	Gettysburg	8*

Quarterfinals; May 14
N1	Cortland St.	11*
N2	Middlebury	10
N4	Ithaca	13*
Western New England	12
S1	Salisbury U	15
S4	Cabrini	7
S3	Washington (MD)	5
S2	Gettysburg	12

Semifinals; May 18
N1	Cortland St.	16
N4	Ithaca	5
S1	Salisbury U	11*
S2	Gettysburg	10

Final; May 25
N1	Cortland St.	13
S1	Salisbury U	19

- * = Overtime
