= Cortland Red Dragons =

Intercollegiate sports teams of State University of New York at Cortland

- University: State University of New York at Cortland
- Nickname: Red Dragons
- NCAA: Division III
- Conference: SUNYAC, NJAC
- Athletic director: Mike Urtz
- Location: Cortland, New York
- Varsity teams: 23
- Football stadium: SUNY Cortland Stadium Complex
- Basketball arena: Whitney T. Corey Gymnasium
- Baseball stadium: Robert H. Wallace Field
- Other venues: Alumni Arena
- Colors: Red and white
- Mascot: Blaze
- Website: www.cortlandreddragons.com

Team NCAA championships
- 20

The Cortland Red Dragons (also known as the SUNY Cortland Red Dragons or the Cortland State Red Dragons) are composed of 23 teams representing the State University of New York at Cortland in intercollegiate athletics, including men and women's basketball, cross country, ice hockey, lacrosse, soccer, swimming & diving, and track and field. Men's sports include baseball, football, and wrestling. Women's sports include field hockey, golf, gymnastics, volleyball, tennis, and softball. The Red Dragons compete in the NCAA Division III and are members of the State University of New York Athletic Conference for most sports, except for the football team, which competes in the Empire 8 Athletic Conference.

== Teams ==
Men's sports	Women's sports
Basketball	Basketball
Baseball	Softball
Cross country	Cross country
Ice hockey	Ice hockey
Lacrosse	Lacrosse
Soccer	Soccer
Swimming and diving	Swimming and diving
Track and field	Track and field
Football	Field hockey
Wrestling	Gymnastics
	Tennis
Golf
Volleyball

== National championships ==
=== Team ===
Sport	Association	Division	Year	Opponent/Runner-up	Score
Baseball (1)	NCAA	Division III	2015	Wisconsin–La Crosse	11–3, 6–2
Men's cross country (1)	NCAA	Division III	2008	North Central (IL)	80–115
Women's cross country (7)	NCAA	Division III	1989	Wisconsin–Oshkosh	29–62
Women's cross country (7)	NCAA	Division III	1990	Wisconsin–Oshkosh	43–48
Women's cross country (7)	NCAA	Division III	1992	Calvin	18–108
Women's cross country (7)	NCAA	Division III	1993	Calvin	61–93
Women's cross country (7)	NCAA	Division III	1994	Calvin	54–115
Women's cross country (7)	NCAA	Division III	1995	Wisconsin–Oshkosh	46–83
Women's cross country (7)	NCAA	Division III	1997	Wisconsin–Eau Claire	148–167
Field hockey (3)	NCAA	Division III	1993	Mary Washington	1–0
Field hockey (3)	NCAA	Division III	1994	Trenton State	2–1
Field hockey (3)	NCAA	Division III	2001	Messiah	1–0
Football (1)	NCAA	Division III	2023	North Central (IL)	38–37
Men's lacrosse (2)	NCAA	Division III	2006	Salisbury	13–12 (OT)
Men's lacrosse (2)	NCAA	Division III	2009	Gettysburg	9–7
Women's lacrosse (1)	NCAA	Division III	2015	Trinity (CT)	17–6
Women's Soccer (1)	NCAA	Division III	1992	UMass Dartmouth	1–0
Women's indoor track and field (1)	NCAA	Division III	1991	Wisconsin–Oshkosh	50–44.5
Women's outdoor track and field (1)	NCAA	Division III	1985	Southern–New Orleans	62–61

- Asterisk indicates shared national championship

== Baseball ==
Cortland has had nine Major League Baseball draft selections since the draft began in 1965.

Year	Player	Round	Team
1970	Fred Bruntager	31	Tigers
1996	Eric Sparks	30	Expos
1997	Alex Steele	16	Tigers
2000	Craig Kerner	13	Expos
2003	Cory Haggerty	18	White Sox
2006	Andrew Mead	40	White Sox
2006	William Groff	29	Cardinals
2007	James Dougher	24	Blue Jays
2009	Matthew Tone	14	Twins

== 1957 NCAA basketball tournament invitation ==
The Red Dragons were extended and initially accepted an at-large bid to the 1957 NCAA College Division basketball tournament. Cortland State withdrew two days later, in order to participate in the annual State University of New York Teachers College Basketball Tournament instead to avoid creating ill feelings with host Oswego State. The Red Dragons defeated Brockport, 90–53, in the teachers college tournament semifinals and won the championship with a 61–60 comeback victory over Buffalo State. With the Red Dragons trailing midway through the second half, Hal Van Earden and Lou La Grand combined to score 17 points over the final 10 minutes to erase the deficit. Van Earden capped the comeback by sinking a long set shot for the winning basket with just 12 seconds remaining.
