= NCAA Division III men's lacrosse tournament =

Annual championship in men's lacrosse by the NCAA

- Current season, competition or edition: 2026 NCAA Division III Men's Lacrosse Championship
- Association: NCAA
- Sport: College lacrosse
- Founded: 1980; 46 years ago
- Division: Division III
- No. of teams: 34
- Country: United States
- Most recent champion: Tufts (6th title)
- Most titles: Hobart (13); Salisbury (13)
- Website: NCAA.com

The NCAA Division III men's lacrosse tournament is the annual championship in men's lacrosse that is held by the NCAA for teams competing in their Division III level each year.

After the inauguration of the NCAA Division I championship in 1971, the USILA added a "small college" tournament for two years. Hobart defeated Washington College 15-12 to win the 1972 USILA title. And then a year later Cortland State was able to do it by beating Washington College to win the 1973 title, 13-8.

The NCAA conducted a combined Division II and III tournament for the 1974 through 1979 seasons, followed by separate tournaments for Division II and Division III beginning in 1980.

Hobart and Salisbury have been the most successful teams at the Division III level, winning thirteen titles for each. Hobart, however, has since departed for Division I.

Tufts is the current defending national champion, winning their 6th national title in program history in 2026 which also is their 3rd in a row.

== Results ==
NCAA Division III Men's Lacrosse Championship
Year	Site (Host Team)	Stadium	Championship Results			Semifinalists
Year	Site (Host Team)	Stadium	Champion	Score	Runner-up	Semifinalists
1980; Details	Geneva, NY (Hobart)	Boswell Field	Hobart	11–8	Cortland State	Ithaca and Salisbury State
1981; Details	Geneva, NY (Hobart)	Boswell Field	Hobart (2)	10–8	Cortland State	Salisbury State and Washington (MD)
1982; Details	Geneva, NY (Hobart)	Boswell Field	Hobart (3)	9–8 (OT)	Washington (MD)	Roanoke and Salisbury State
1983; Details	Geneva, NY (Hobart)	Boswell Field	Hobart (4)	13–9	Roanoke	Ohio Wesleyan and Washington (MD)
1984; Details	Geneva, NY (Hobart)	Boswell Field	Hobart (5)	12–5	Washington (MD)	RIT and Salisbury State
1985; Details	Chestertown, MD (Washington (MD))	Kibler Field	Hobart (6)	15–8	Washington (MD)	Cortland State and RIT
1986; Details	Geneva, NY (Hobart)	Boswell Field	Hobart (7)	13–10	Washington (MD)	Cortland State and Ohio Wesleyan
1987; Details	Geneva, NY (Hobart)	Boswell Field	Hobart (8)	9–5	Ohio Wesleyan	RIT and Washington and Lee
1988; Details	Delaware, OH (Ohio Wesleyan)	Selby Field	Hobart (9)	18–9	Ohio Wesleyan	Franklin & Marshall and Roanoke
1989; Details	Geneva, NY (Hobart)	Boswell Field	Hobart (10)	11–8	Ohio Wesleyan	Nazareth (NY) and Washington (MD)
1990; Details	Geneva, NY (Hobart)	Boswell Field	Hobart (11)	18–6	Washington (MD)	Ohio Wesleyan and Salisbury State
1991; Details	Salisbury, MD (Salisbury State)	Sea Gull Stadium	Hobart (12)	12–11	Salisbury State	Nazareth (NY) and Ohio Wesleyan
1992; Details	Philadelphia, PA (Penn)	Franklin Field	Nazareth (NY)	22–11	Roanoke	Hobart and Ithaca
1993; Details	College Park, MD (Maryland)	Byrd Stadium	Hobart (13)	16–10	Ohio Wesleyan	Nazareth (NY) and Washington (MD)
1994; Details	College Park, MD (Maryland)	Byrd Stadium	Salisbury State	15–9	Hobart	Gettysburg and Nazareth (NY)
1995; Details	College Park, MD (Maryland)	Byrd Stadium	Salisbury State (2)	22–13	Nazareth (NY)	Gettysburg and Ohio Wesleyan
1996; Details	College Park, MD (Maryland)	Byrd Stadium	Nazareth (NY) (2)	11–10 (OT)	Washington (MD)	Ohio Wesleyan and Salisbury State
1997; Details	College Park, MD (Maryland)	Byrd Stadium	Nazareth (NY) (3)	15–14 (OT)	Washington (MD)	Gettysburg and Ohio Wesleyan
1998; Details	Piscataway, NJ (Rutgers)	Rutgers Stadium	Washington (MD)	16–10	Nazareth (NY)	Ohio Wesleyan and Salisbury State
1999; Details	College Park, MD (Maryland)	Byrd Stadium	Salisbury State (3)	13–6	Middlebury	Denison and RIT
2000; Details	College Park, MD (Maryland)	Byrd Stadium	Middlebury	16–12	Salisbury State	Nazareth (NY) and Washington & Lee
2001; Details	Piscataway, NJ (Rutgers)	Rutgers Stadium	Middlebury (2)	15–10	Gettysburg	Denison and Nazareth (NY)
2002; Details	Piscataway, NJ (Rutgers)	Rutgers Stadium	Middlebury (3)	14–9	Gettysburg	Ithaca and Washington & Lee
2003; Details	Baltimore, MD	M&T Bank Stadium	Salisbury (4)	14–13 (OT)	Middlebury	SUNY Cortland and Whittier
2004; Details	Baltimore, MD	M&T Bank Stadium	Salisbury (5)	13–9	Nazareth (NY)	Middlebury and Washington (MD)
2005; Details	Philadelphia, PA	Lincoln Financial Field	Salisbury (6)	11–10	Middlebury	Nazareth and Roanoke
2006; Details	Philadelphia, PA	Lincoln Financial Field	SUNY Cortland	13–12 (OT)	Salisbury'	Roanoke and Wesleyan
2007; Details	Baltimore, MD	M&T Bank Stadium	Salisbury (7)	15–9	SUNY Cortland	Gettysburg and Wesleyan
2008; Details	Foxborough, MA	Gillette Stadium	Salisbury (8)	19–13	SUNY Cortland	Ithaca and Gettysburg
2009; Details	Foxborough, MA	Gillette Stadium	SUNY Cortland (2)	9–7	Gettysburg	Middlebury and Stevenson
2010; Details	Baltimore, MD	M&T Bank Stadium	Tufts	9–6	Salisbury	SUNY Cortland and Stevenson
2011; Details	Baltimore, MD	M&T Bank Stadium	Salisbury (9)	19–7	Tufts	Roanoke and RIT
2012; Details	Foxborough, MA	Gillette Stadium	Salisbury (10)	14–10	SUNY Cortland	Stevenson and Tufts
2013; Details	Philadelphia, PA	Lincoln Financial Field	Stevenson	16–14	RIT	SUNY Cortland and Salisbury
2014; Details	Baltimore, MD	M&T Bank Stadium	Tufts (2)	12–9	Salisbury	RIT and Washington (MD)
2015; Details	Philadelphia, PA	Lincoln Financial Field	Tufts (3)	19–11	Lynchburg	RIT and Gettysburg
2016; Details	Philadelphia, PA	Lincoln Financial Field	Salisbury (11)	14–13	Tufts	St. Lawrence and Gettysburg
2017; Details	Foxborough, MA	Gillette Stadium	Salisbury (12)	15–7	RIT	Denison and Wesleyan
2018; Details	Foxborough, MA	Gillette Stadium	Wesleyan	8–6	Salisbury	Gettysburg and RIT
2019; Details	Philadelphia, PA	Lincoln Financial Field	Cabrini	16–12	Amherst	Williams and Salisbury
2020; Details	Canceled due to COVID-19					
2021; Details	East Hartford, CT	Pratt & Whitney Stadium	RIT	15–14 (2OT)	Salisbury	Tufts and Christopher Newport
2022; Details	East Hartford, CT	Pratt & Whitney Stadium	RIT (2)	12–10	Union	Tufts and York
2023; Details	Philadelphia, PA	Lincoln Financial Field	Salisbury (13)	17–12	Tufts	Christopher Newport and RIT
2024; Details	Philadelphia, PA	Lincoln Financial Field	Tufts (4)	18–14	RIT	Bowdoin and Washington & Lee
2025; Details	Foxborough, MA	Gillette Stadium	Tufts (5)	25–8	Dickinson	Bowdoin and RIT
2026; Details	Charlottesville, Virginia (Virginia)	Scott Stadium	Tufts (6)	17–11	RIT	Bowdoin and Wesleyan
2027	Philadelphia, PA	Lincoln Financial Field				
2028	Foxborough, MA	Gillette Stadium				

== Champions ==
=== Active programs ===
Team	Titles	Years
Salisbury	13	1994, 1995, 1999, 2003, 2004, 2005, 2007, 2008, 2011, 2012, 2016, 2017, 2023
Tufts	6	2010, 2014, 2015, 2024, 2025, 2026
Middlebury	3	2000, 2001, 2002
Nazareth	3	1992, 1996, 1997
RIT	2	2021, 2022
Cortland	2	2006, 2009
Stevenson	1	2013
Wesleyan (CT)	1	2018
Washington College	1	1998

=== Former programs ===
Team	Titles	Years
Hobart	13 (Note: Currently plays NCAA Division I men's lacrosse despite being a Division III member)	1980, 1981, 1982, 1983, 1984, 1985, 1986, 1987, 1988, 1989, 1990, 1991, 1993
Cabrini	1	2019

=== Finals appearances by state ===
State	Champions	School	Runners-up	School
(New York (state)) New York	20	Hobart (13), Nazareth (3), RIT (2), SUNY Cortland (2)	15	SUNY Cortland (5), RIT (4), Nazareth (3), Hobart (2), Union (1)
Maryland	15	Salisbury (13), Washington (1), Stevenson (1)	13	Washington (7), Salisbury (6)
Massachusetts	6	Tufts (6)	4	Tufts (3), Amherst (1)
Vermont	3	Middlebury (3)	3	Middlebury (3)
Pennsylvania	1	Cabrini (1)	4	Gettysburg (3), Dickinson (1)
Connecticut	1	Wesleyan (1)	0	
Ohio	0		4	Ohio Wesleyan (4)
Virginia	0		3	Roanoke (2), Lynchburg (1)

== See also ==
- NCAA Men's Lacrosse Championships (Division I, Division II)
- NCAA Women's Lacrosse Championships (Division I, Division II, Division III)
- NAIA Men's Lacrosse Invitational
- United States Intercollegiate Lacrosse Association
- Wingate Memorial Trophy
- North–South Senior All-Star Game
- Pre-NCAA Lacrosse Champion
