= Hobart Statesmen men's lacrosse =

Men's lacrosse team

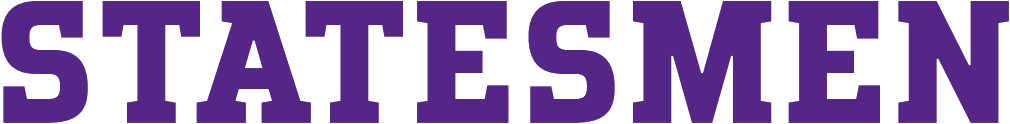
- Founded: 1898
- University: Hobart and William Smith Colleges
- Head coach: Stephen Brundage (since 2026 season)
- Stadium: Boswell Field
- Location: Geneva, New York
- Conference: Atlantic 10 Conference
- Nickname: Statesmen
- Colors: Purple and orange

Pre-NCAA era championships
- 1972

NCAA Tournament championships
- (15) 1976*, 1977*, 1980^, 1981^, 1982^, 1983^, 1984^, 1985^, 1986^, 1987^, 1988^, 1989^, 1990^, 1991^, 1993^

NCAA Tournament Runner-Up
- 1974*, 1975*, 1978*, 1994^

NCAA Tournament Final Fours
- (20) 1974*, 1975*, 1976*, 1977*, 1978*, 1980^, 1981^, 1982^, 1983^, 1984^, 1985^, 1986^, 1987^, 1988^, 1989^, 1990^, 1991^, 1992^, 1993^, 1994^

NCAA Tournament Quarterfinals
- 1974*, 1975*, 1976*, 1977*, 1978*, 1979*, 1980^, 1981^, 1982^, 1983^, 1984^, 1985^, 1986^, 1987^, 1988^, 1989^, 1990^, 1991^, 1992^, 1993^, 1994^

NCAA Tournament appearances
- (26) 1974*, 1975*, 1976*, 1977*, 1978*, 1979*, 1980^, 1981^, 1982^, 1983^, 1984^, 1985^, 1986^, 1987^, 1988^, 1989^, 1990^, 1991^, 1992^, 1993^, 1994^, 1998, 2000, 2002, 2004, 2016

Conference Tournament championships
- 2016

Conference regular season championships
- 2000, 2002, 2017; *Division II ^Division III

The Hobart Statesmen men's lacrosse team represents the Hobart College in National Collegiate Athletic Association (NCAA) Division I college lacrosse. The program was created in 1898 and played its home games at Boswell Field. The Statesmen competed in the Northeast Conference from 2014 to 2022, with previous conference membership in the Patriot League and the ECAC Lacrosse League as a Division I program. Starting with the 2023 season, Hobart will play in the newly established men's lacrosse league of the Atlantic 10 Conference (A-10). Through 2022, the team has an all–time record of 801-521-20.

Hobart has captured 16 national championships, including two NCAA Division II championships and 13 NCAA Division III championships. The athletics program elevated its team to NCAA Division I in 1995 to preserve its historic lacrosse rivalries with Cornell and Syracuse. Despite an effort to reclassify the Statesmen back to Division III in 2008 by the college’s Board of Trustees, a strong response from Hobart’s alumni base prevented the change and kept the program in Division I.

In 2014, Hobart joined the Northeast Conference (NEC) as an associate member in men’s lacrosse, increasing the conference’s membership to 7 teams. During their stint in the conference, the Statesmen won league tournament and regular season championships in 2016 and 2017 respectively, making their fifth NCAA tournament appearance at the Division I level in 2016. Hobart left NEC men's lacrosse after the 2022 season to join the newly established A-10 men's lacrosse league.

== Season results ==
The following is a list of Hobart's results by season since the institution of NCAA Division I in 1971:

Season	Coach	Overall	Conference	Standing	Postseason
Jerry Schmidt (Independent) (1968–1978)
1968	Jerry Schmidt	11–5			
1969	Jerry Schmidt	13–4			
1970	Jerry Schmidt	9–5			
1971	Jerry Schmidt	12–6			
1972	Jerry Schmidt	17–1			USILA Champion
1973	Jerry Schmidt	12–4			USILA Final Four
1974	Jerry Schmidt	14–2			NCAA Division II Runner–Up
1975	Jerry Schmidt	13–2			NCAA Division II Runner–Up
1976	Jerry Schmidt	14–3			NCAA Division II Champion
1977	Jerry Schmidt	15–0			NCAA Division II Champion
1978	Jerry Schmidt	13–2			NCAA Division II Runner–Up
Jerry Schmidt:		176–48 (.786)			
Tom Korn (Independent) (1979–1980)
1979	Tom Korn	7–3			NCAA Division II Quarterfinals
Tom Korn:		7–3 (.700)			
Dave Urick (Independent) (1980–1989)
1980	Dave Urick	12–2			NCAA Division III Champion
1981	Dave Urick	12–3			NCAA Division III Champion
1982	Dave Urick	11–3			NCAA Division III Champion
1983	Dave Urick	13–2			NCAA Division III Champion
1984	Dave Urick	9–4			NCAA Division III Champion
1985	Dave Urick	11–3			NCAA Division III Champion
1986	Dave Urick	15–1			NCAA Division III Champion
1987	Dave Urick	10–4			NCAA Division III Champion
1988	Dave Urick	14–4			NCAA Division III Champion
1989	Dave Urick	15–4			NCAA Division III Champion
Dave Urick:		122–30 (.803)			
B.J. O’Hara (Independent) (1990–1999)
1990	B.J. O’Hara	15–1			NCAA Division III Champion
1991	B.J. O’Hara	8–6			NCAA Division III Champion
1992	B.J. O’Hara	9–4			NCAA Division III Final Four
1993	B.J. O’Hara	11–3			NCAA Division III Champion
1994	B.J. O’Hara	11–3			NCAA Division III Runner–Up
1995	B.J. O’Hara	7–6			
1996	B.J. O’Hara	5–7			
1997	B.J. O’Hara	5–7			
1998	B.J. O’Hara	8–5			NCAA Division I First Round
1999	B.J. O’Hara	6–7			
B.J. O’Hara (Patriot League) (2000–2001)
2000	B.J. O’Hara	7–7	5–1	T–1st	NCAA Division I First Round
2001	B.J. O’Hara	5–7	5–1	2nd	
B.J. O’Hara:		97–63 (.606)	10–2 (.833)		
Matt Kerwick (Patriot League) (2002–2004)
2002	Matt Kerwick	6–8	5–1	T–1st	NCAA Division I First Round
2003	Matt Kerwick	5–8	4–2	T–3rd	
2004	Matt Kerwick	9–7	6–1	2nd	NCAA Division I First Round
Matt Kerwick (ECAC Lacrosse League) (2005–2008)
2005	Matt Kerwick	7–7	2–4	5th	
2006	Matt Kerwick	6–8	1–6	6th	
2007	Matt Kerwick	5–9	1–6	8th	
2008	Matt Kerwick	8–6	4–3	T–3rd	
Matt Kerwick:		46–53 (.465)	23–23 (.500)		
T.W. Johnson (ECAC Lacrosse League) (2009–2013)
2009	T.W. Johnson	7–7	2–5	T–6th	
2010	T.W. Johnson	3–11	1–6	7th	
2011	T.W. Johnson	5–9	2–4	6th	
2012	T.W. Johnson	4–9	2–4	5th	
2013	T.W. Johnson	6–8	2–4	T–6th	
T.W. Johnson:		25–44 (.362)	9–23 (.281)		
Greg Raymond (Northeast Conference) (2014–2022)
2014	Greg Raymond	5–10	3–3	4th	
2015	Greg Raymond	7–7	4–2	T–2nd	
2016	Greg Raymond	10–7	4–2	T–3rd	NCAA Division I Play–In Round
2017	Greg Raymond	9–7	5–1	1st	
2018	Greg Raymond	4–10	1–5	6th	
2019	Greg Raymond	11–5	4–2	T–2nd	
2020	Greg Raymond	4–1	0–0	†	†
2021	Greg Raymond	6–3	6–2	2nd	
2022	Greg Raymond	7–6	4–3	T–3rd	
Greg Raymond (Atlantic 10 Conference) (2023–2025)
2023	Greg Raymond	5–8	1–4	5th	
2024	Greg Raymond	4–9	1–4	5th	
2025	Greg Raymond	5–9	2–3	T–3rd	
Greg Raymond:		77–82 (.484)	35–31 (.530)		
Stephen Brundage (Atlantic 10 Conference) (2026–present)
2026	Stephen Brundage	3–10	1–5	6th	
Stephen Brundage:		3–10(.231)	1–5 (.167)		
Total:		818–557–20 (.594)			
National champion Postseason invitational champion Conference regular season champion Conference regular season and conference tournament champion Division regular season champion Division regular season and conference tournament champion Conference tournament champion

†NCAA canceled 2020 collegiate activities due to COVID-19.

== See also ==
- Cornell–Hobart lacrosse rivalry
- Hobart–Syracuse lacrosse rivalry
