= Salisbury Sea Gulls =

- University: Salisbury University
- Nickname: Seagulls
- NCAA: Division III
- Conference: List: Coast to Coast; NJAC (football) (swimming and diving); Coastal Lacrosse Conference (lacrosse)
- Athletic director: Monica Polizzi
- Location: Salisbury, Maryland, U.S.
- First year: 1928
- Varsity teams: 23 (10 men's, 11 women's, 2 co-ed)
- Football stadium: Sea Gull Stadium
- Basketball arena: Maggs Physical Activities Center
- Baseball stadium: Donnie Williams Sea Gull Baseball Stadium
- Softball stadium: Margie Knight Sea Gull Softball Stadium
- Soccer stadium: Gerry DiBartolo Sea Gull Soccer Complex
- Aquatics center: Maggs Physical Activities Center Swimming Pool
- Tennis venue: SU Indoor and Outdoor Tennis Center
- Colors: Maroon and gold
- Mascot: Sammy the Seagull
- Fight song: "Salisbury Fight Song"
- Website: suseagulls.com

Team NCAA championships
- 23

Individual and relay NCAA champions
- 26

The Salisbury Sea Gulls (formerly the Salisbury State Sea Gulls) are the athletic teams that represent Salisbury University, located in Salisbury, Maryland, in NCAA Division III intercollegiate sports.

The Sea Gulls compete as members of the Coast to Coast Athletic Conference (C2C) for most sports, although several programs compete as affiliates in other leagues: football and men's and women's swimming in the New Jersey Athletic Conference and men's lacrosse in the Coastal Lacrosse Conference.

== History ==
=== Conference affiliations ===
- Capital Athletic Conference (1993–2020)
- Coast to Coast Athletic Conference (2020–present)

=== Mascot ===
The university mascot is named "Sammy Sea Gull." The Sea Gull name evolved from the Salisbury State College Golden Gulls, which was chosen in a 1948 contest. In 1963, the mascot was changed to a sea gull because the school's athletic teams were often referred to as the SSC Gulls (C-Gulls), and the nickname "Sammy Sea Gull" followed in the 1970s.

== Varsity teams ==
Men's sports	Women’s sports
Baseball	Basketball
Basketball	Cross country
Cross country	Field Hockey
Football	Golf
Golf	Lacrosse
Lacrosse	Soccer
Soccer	Softball
Swimming	Swimming
Tennis	Tennis
Track and field	Track and field
	Volleyball

== National championships ==
=== Team ===
Sport	Association	Division	Year	Opponent/Runner-up	Score
Field hockey (5)	NCAA	Division III	1986	Bloomsburg	3–2
Field hockey (5)	NCAA	Division III	2003	Middlebury	4–1
Field hockey (5)	NCAA	Division III	2004	Middlebury	6–3
Field hockey (5)	NCAA	Division III	2005	Middlebury	1–0
Field hockey (5)	NCAA	Division III	2009	Messiah	1–0
Men's lacrosse (13)	NCAA	Division III	1994	Hobart	15–9
Men's lacrosse (13)	NCAA	Division III	1995	Nazareth	22–13
Men's lacrosse (13)	NCAA	Division III	1999	Middlebury	13–6
Men's lacrosse (13)	NCAA	Division III	2003	Middlebury	14–13 (OT)
Men's lacrosse (13)	NCAA	Division III	2004	Nazareth	13–9
Men's lacrosse (13)	NCAA	Division III	2005	Middlebury	11–10
Men's lacrosse (13)	NCAA	Division III	2007	Cortland	15–9
Men's lacrosse (13)	NCAA	Division III	2008	Cortland	19–13
Men's lacrosse (13)	NCAA	Division III	2011	Tufts	19–7
Men's lacrosse (13)	NCAA	Division III	2012	Cortland	14–10
Men's lacrosse (13)	NCAA	Division III	2016	Tufts	14–13
Men's lacrosse (13)	NCAA	Division III	2017	RIT	15–7
Men's lacrosse (13)	NCAA	Division III	2023	Tufts	17–12
Women's lacrosse (4)	NCAA	Division III	2010	Hamilton	7–6
Women's lacrosse (4)	NCAA	Division III	2013	Trinity (CT)	12–5
Women's lacrosse (4)	NCAA	Division III	2014	Trinity (CT)	9–6
Women's lacrosse (4)	NCAA	Division III	2021	Tufts	14–13
Baseball (1)	NCAA	Division III	2021	St. Thomas	6-1; 4-2

== Regents Cup and Charles B. Clark Cup ==
In addition to regular-season and tournament play, the Sea Gulls compete twice a year against other local universities. In the fall, the football team formerly competed against Frostburg State University for the Regents Cup. Following Frostburg's move to NCAA Division II in 2018 however, the game has not been played since. Across their 46 matchups since 1973, Salisbury compiled a 28-19 record against Frostburg. In the spring, the men's lacrosse team competes against Washington College for the Charles B. Clark Cup; this annual event being known among the two institutions as the "War on the Shore", and the two schools take turns every year hosting the event.
