= Washington College =

Private college in Chestertown, Maryland, US

- Motto: Scientia, Veritas, Civitas
- Motto in English: Knowledge, Truth, Citizenship
- Type: Private liberal arts college
- Established: 1723; 303 years ago, as Kent County Free School; 1782; 244 years ago, as Washington College
- Founders: William Smith, et al.
- Accreditation: MSCHE
- Affiliations: CLAC; NAICU; Annapolis Group
- Endowment: $349.6 million (2025)
- President: Bryan L. Matthews
- Provost: Kiho Kim
- Faculty: 136 (2025)
- Undergraduates: 933 (fall 2025)
- Location: Chestertown, Maryland, United States; 39°13′05″N 76°04′10″W
- Campus: 112 acres (45 ha); Town
- Newspaper: The Elm
- Colors: Maroon; Black
- Nicknames: Shoremen & Shorewomen or Goose Nation
- Sporting affiliations: NCAA Division III – Centennial Conference; MARC; MAISA
- Mascot: Gus the Goose
- Website: www.washcoll.edu

Washington College is a private liberal arts college in Chestertown, Maryland. Founded in 1782 by Episcopal priest William Smith, Washington College is, by its charter, the oldest college in the state of Maryland, and the 10th oldest college in the United States. The college is named after George Washington, who pledged 50 guineas to the college, served on its board of visitors and governors until 1789, and consented to have the college named in his honor whilst he lived; the only college named after him to have this distinction. It became coeducational in 1891.

== History ==
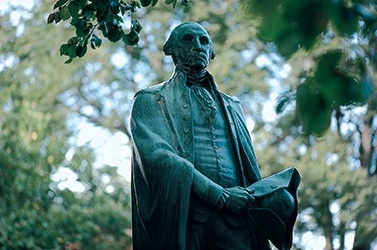
A bronze George Washington statue overlooks the campus green.

Washington College evolved from the Kent County Free School, an institution of more than 200 years standing in "Chester Town," which by the college's founding date of 1782 had reached considerable strength and importance as a port city. George Washington consented to the fledgling college's use of his name (the only institution of higher education in the United States with this claim), pledged the sum of 50 guineas to its establishment, and extended his warm wishes for the "lasting and extensive usefulness" of the institution. He later served on Washington College's Board of Visitors and Governors.

The college's first president, the Episcopalian priest William Smith, was a prominent figure in colonial affairs of letters and church, and he had a wide acquaintance among the great men of colonial days, including Benjamin Franklin. Joining General Washington on the board of visitors and governors of the new college were other notable people such as U.S. Senator John Henry, Congressman Joshua Seney, and Governor of Maryland William Paca. The Maryland legislature granted its first college charter to Washington College in May 1782. The following spring, on May 14, 1783, the college held its first commencement.

President Smith had envisaged Washington College as the Eastern Shore campus of a public "University of Maryland" with St. John's College as its Western Shore counterpart, a proposal incorporated into the later institution's 1784 state charter, but the Maryland General Assembly's reluctance to provide funding meant this was never more than a paper institution and the relationship ended with Smith's return to Philadelphia in 1789.

With his election as the first President of the United States, General Washington retired from the board of visitors and governors. He accepted the honorary degree of doctor of laws, which a delegation from Chestertown presented to him on June 24, 1789, in New York, then the seat of Congress. Since Washington's last visit to campus, Washington College has hosted five U.S. presidents: Franklin Delano Roosevelt, Harry S Truman, Dwight Eisenhower, John F. Kennedy and George H. W. Bush.

The original college building cornerstone was laid in May 1783; it opened in 1788 after selling off acreage and starting a lottery to fund the project. The hall was still incomplete by 1794 and was destroyed by a basement fire on January 11, 1827. The oldest existing building, Middle Hall, was erected in 1844 on the site of the original college building. By 1860, Middle Hall was joined by East and West Halls. All three structures, known as the Hill Dorms, are on the Maryland Register of Historic Places.

== Academics ==
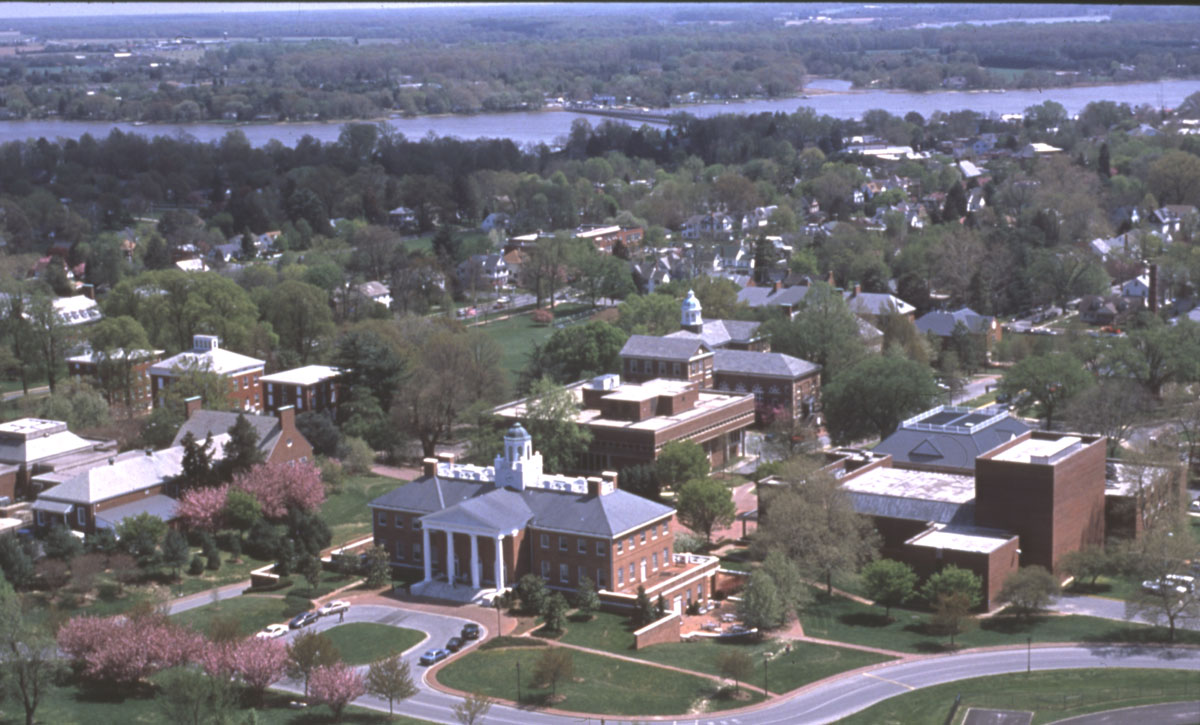
Washington College campus

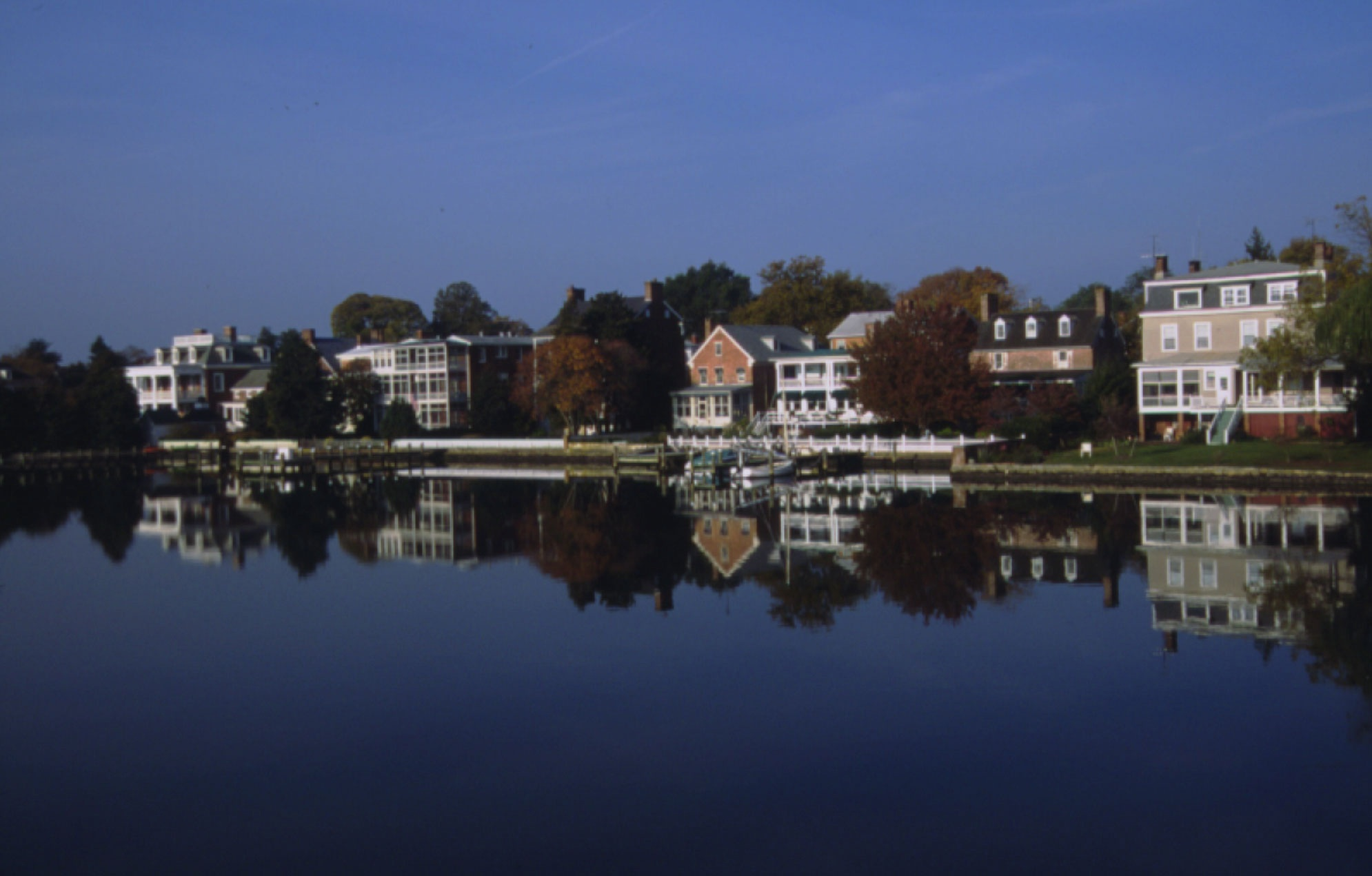
Chestertown historic waterfront

Washington College offers 34 majors and 35 minors or concentrations. The most popular majors, based on 2025 graduates, were:

- Business Administration & Management (33)
- Psychology (25)
- Environmental Science (24)
- Biology/Biological Sciences (22)
- English Language & Literature (14)
- Political Science & Government (14)
- Economics (11)

Washington College's overall graduation rate is 66%, with the most recent four-year graduation being 63.5%. The college confers Bachelor of Arts and Bachelor of Science degrees. According to the college, 95% of students were either employed or in some form of graduate school within 9 months of graduation.

933 undergraduate students attended Washington College during the 2025–2026 academic year. During that year, 64% of all first-year applicants were accepted, and 48% of all transfer students were accepted.The mean SAT total amongst first-year applicants was 1198, with 24% of applicants sending in their scores. The average high school GPA amongst first year students was 3.59.

During the 2025–2026 academic year, 51% of incoming first-year students were from Maryland, with the remaining 49% either coming from out of state, or from one of the 24 foreign countries represented at Washington College. 24.8 percent of undergraduates are minority students with 9.4% identifying as African-American, 10.4% identifying as Hispanic-American, 2.1% identifying as Asian-American, and with 0.7% identifying as either Native American or Pacific Islander. 84% of students lived in an on-campus residence during the 2025–2026 academic year; the rest commute either from off-campus housing or home.

In the 2025–26 academic year, the student-to-faculty ratio was 8.9:1.

=== Rankings ===
In 2026,The Princeton Review placed Washington College in the top 15% of all US colleges and had the distinction of being one of The Princeton Review's 58 featured colleges. The 2027 Niche rankings for Washington College placed it as the 90th best liberal arts college, the 8th best college in Maryland, and the 585th best college in the nation. In the 2027 edition of U.S. News & World Report Best National Liberal Arts Colleges, Washington College was 97th in the nation, tied alongside Austin College and Lewis & Clark College.

== Literary prizes ==
Each year, Washington College awards the nation's largest undergraduate literary prize. Since 1968, the Sophie Kerr Prize has been presented to one graduating senior demonstrating the greatest literary promise. The endowment created by Sophie Kerr, a writer who published 23 novels and dozens of short stories, has provided more than $1.4 million in prize money to young writers. At a ceremony held at the Poets House in New York City on May 17, 2011, Lisa Jones was selected as the winner of the $61,000 Sophie Kerr Prize.

In 2005, Washington College inaugurated another literary prize, the George Washington Book Prize, administered by the college's C.V. Starr Center for the Study of the American Experience and awarded in partnership with the Gilder Lehrman Institute of American History and George Washington's Mount Vernon. The prize is awarded annually to the most significant new book about the founding era. At $50,000, the prize is one of the most generous book awards in the United States. Richard Beeman won the 2010 George Washington Book Prize for his work, Plain, Honest Men: The Making of the American Constitution.

In 2015, the Rose O'Neill Literary House, Washington College's center for literature and the literary arts, established the Douglass Wallop Fellowship as a nationwide competition, with the first fellowship going to playwright Sheri Wilner. The award will be granted biennially to a playwright.

== Student life ==
Washington College has over 80 clubs, which cover a wide range of subjects and purposes from recreational clubs to academic societies.

Only seniors can apply to live off campus; the rest are required to live on campus (unless they are local or commuters). On-campus housing can accommodate approximately 1,056 students (not including quad rooms that can be converted). Most students stay on campus over the weekend to participate in various social and recreational activities.

Washington College has joined the American College & University Presidents Climate Commitment with a Campus carbon neutrality goal. The Center for Environment and Society oversees the Chesapeake Semester program, four interdisciplinary courses that use the college's location in the Chesapeake Bay watershed to explore environmental issues and advocacy.

Washington College hosts the Harwood Series, which includes speeches by national politicians and media pundits. Because of its reputation as a liberal arts school with creative writing being a strength, writers such as John Barth, Ray Bradbury, Bobbie Ann Mason, Colum McCann, Neil Gaiman, Tim O'Brien, Junot Díaz, Lawrence Ferlinghetti, and Robert Pinsky have given readings at the campus.

=== Greek life ===
Greek life at Washington College comprises two men's fraternities and two women's sororities. According to US News, in 2025, 13% of undergraduate men join a fraternity, while 9% of undergraduate women join a sorority. Fraternities are housed in West and Middle Hall, and sororities line the Western Shore housing.

Fraternities:

- Kappa Sigma Omicron-Phi – Chartered April 14, 2007
- Phi Delta Theta MD Gamma – Chartered April 25, 1992

Sororities:

- Alpha Omicron Pi Sigma Tau – Chartered May 14, 1938
- Zeta Tau Alpha Gamma Beta – Chartered April 30, 1938

=== Traditions ===
George Washington Birthday Ball: A college-wide dance where students, faculty, staff, alumni, and friends of the college come together to celebrate George Washington's birthday. The event usually occurs on or around George Washington's birth date.

War on the Shore: The annual men's lacrosse game, held in late spring between Washington College and Salisbury University, two of Maryland's Eastern Shore's undergraduate schools. Beginning in 2004, the winner of the game has been awarded the Charles B. Clark Cup.

May Day: Started in 1968 by Professor Bennett Lamond of the English Department, who retired in 2004. He brought a class out onto the green, where they read poetry and drank wine. Later that night, some students returned, and Washington College's May Day celebration was born. Since then, May Day has become a two-day festival on April 30 and May 1, often involving some student body public nudity. Most students use paint, glitter, and other art forms to cover their bodies at this festival. The event draws many students as spectators. The college's Public Safety officers stand at the perimeter of the campus green to prevent students from being publicly indecent off campus grounds.

== Athletics ==
=== Varsity sports ===
Burge of Washington College

Washington College has competed in intercollegiate athletics since the 19th century, beginning with a game of baseball on March 30th, 1867, between the Wissahicon Club of Washington College and a Chestertown team known as the Independents. Its oldest current varsity sports are the baseball team, which dates back to at least the early 1870s, and the men's basketball team, which played its 100th season in 2011–12. Men's teams are known as the Shoremen; women's teams are known as the Shorewomen.

While men have played varsity sports at Washington College for well over a century, varsity opportunities for women have been more recent. The first varsity sports for women – rowing, tennis, and volleyball – were added in the mid-1970s and were followed by the additions of softball, lacrosse, field hockey, and swimming by the mid-1980s. Varsity women's basketball began play during the 1993–94 season, while coed sailing was elevated to varsity status four years later. The women's soccer team is the college's newest varsity sport; it began play during the fall of 1998.

Washington College fielded a varsity football team through 1950, a men's track and field team through 1982, and a men's cross-country team through 1989.

Fourteen of Washington College's 20 varsity teams compete in the Centennial Conference. The men's and women's rowing teams compete in the Mid-Atlantic Rowing Conference (MARC). In contrast, the sailing team competes in the Middle Atlantic Intercollegiate Sailing Association (MAISA) of the Inter-Collegiate Sailing Association (ICSA).

The rowing and sailing teams host regattas on the Chester River and call the college's Truslow Boat House and Lelia Hynson Boating Park home.

The college's 20 varsity teams are:

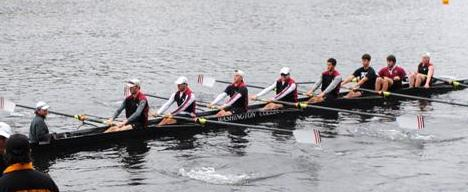
Men's rowing team in 2014

Men's sports	Women's sports
Baseball	Basketball
Basketball	Field hockey
Golf	Golf
Lacrosse	Lacrosse
Rowing	Rowing
Soccer	Soccer
Swimming	Softball
Tennis	Swimming
	Tennis
	Volleyball
Co-ed sports
Sailing
Trap and skeet

==== Lacrosse ====
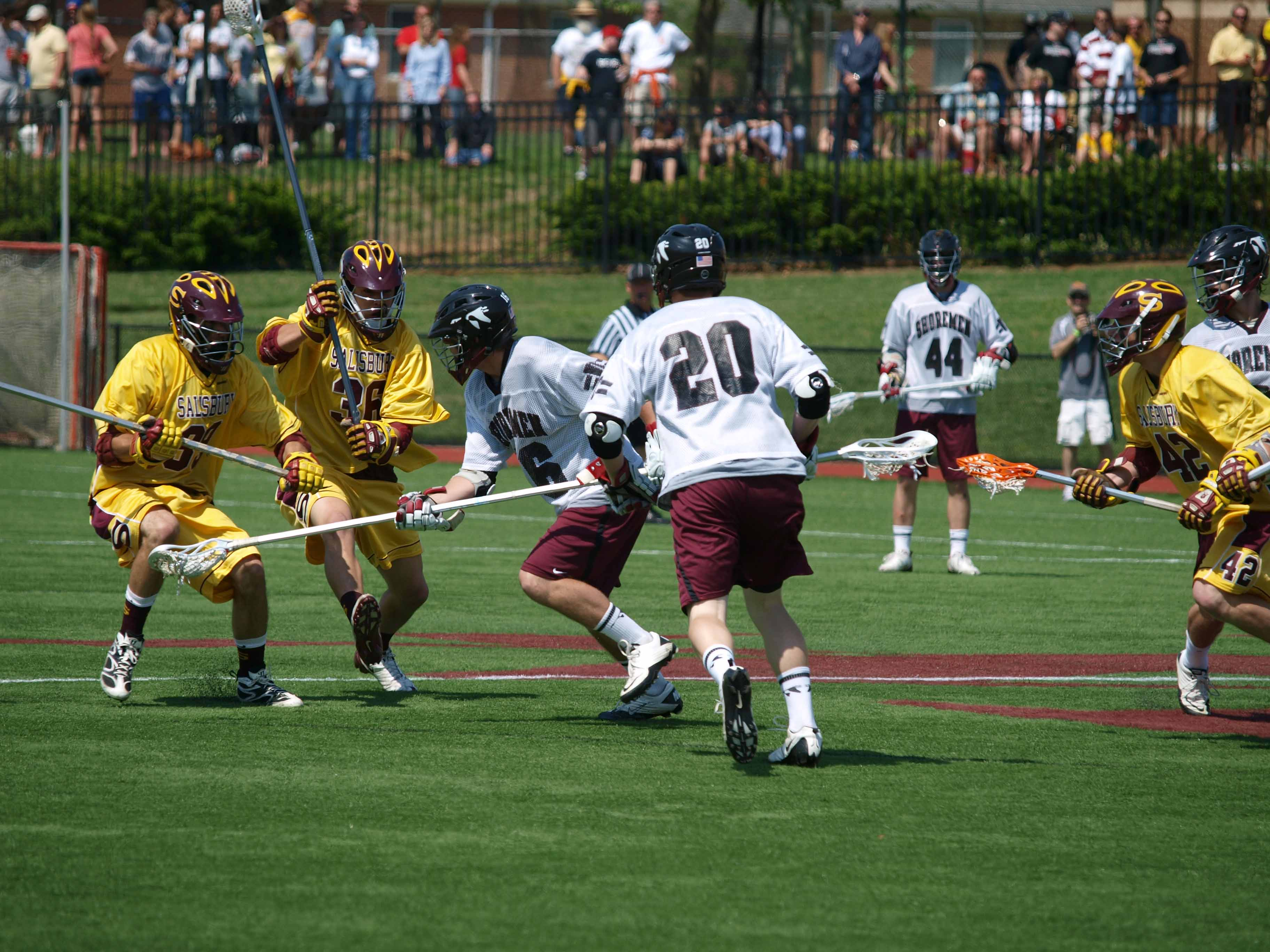
The annual lacrosse rivalry between Washington College and Salisbury University is known as War on the Shore

The college is known for its men's lacrosse team. It won the 1998 NCAA Division III National Championship and a share of the 1954 USILA Laurie Cox Division National Championship. The men's lacrosse team has participated in the NCAA Division II or III Tournament 28 times since 1974 and the NCAA Division III Championship game eight times. Washington College men's lacrosse players have earned All-America honors 226 times.

The men's and women's lacrosse teams, men's and women's soccer teams, and field hockey teams compete on Kibler Field at Roy Kirby Jr. Stadium. Completed in 2006, the stadium was named one of the top 10 venues for collegiate lacrosse by Lacrosse Magazine.

== Campus ==
This section of the page lists all of the buildings on campus according to the college's maps of the main campus and waterfront campus. The buildings, with the exception of the historic Hill Dorms, are organized based on the key provided for both maps. Information and pictures for these buildings shall be added onto this page on a building-by-building basis.

=== The Hill Dorms ===
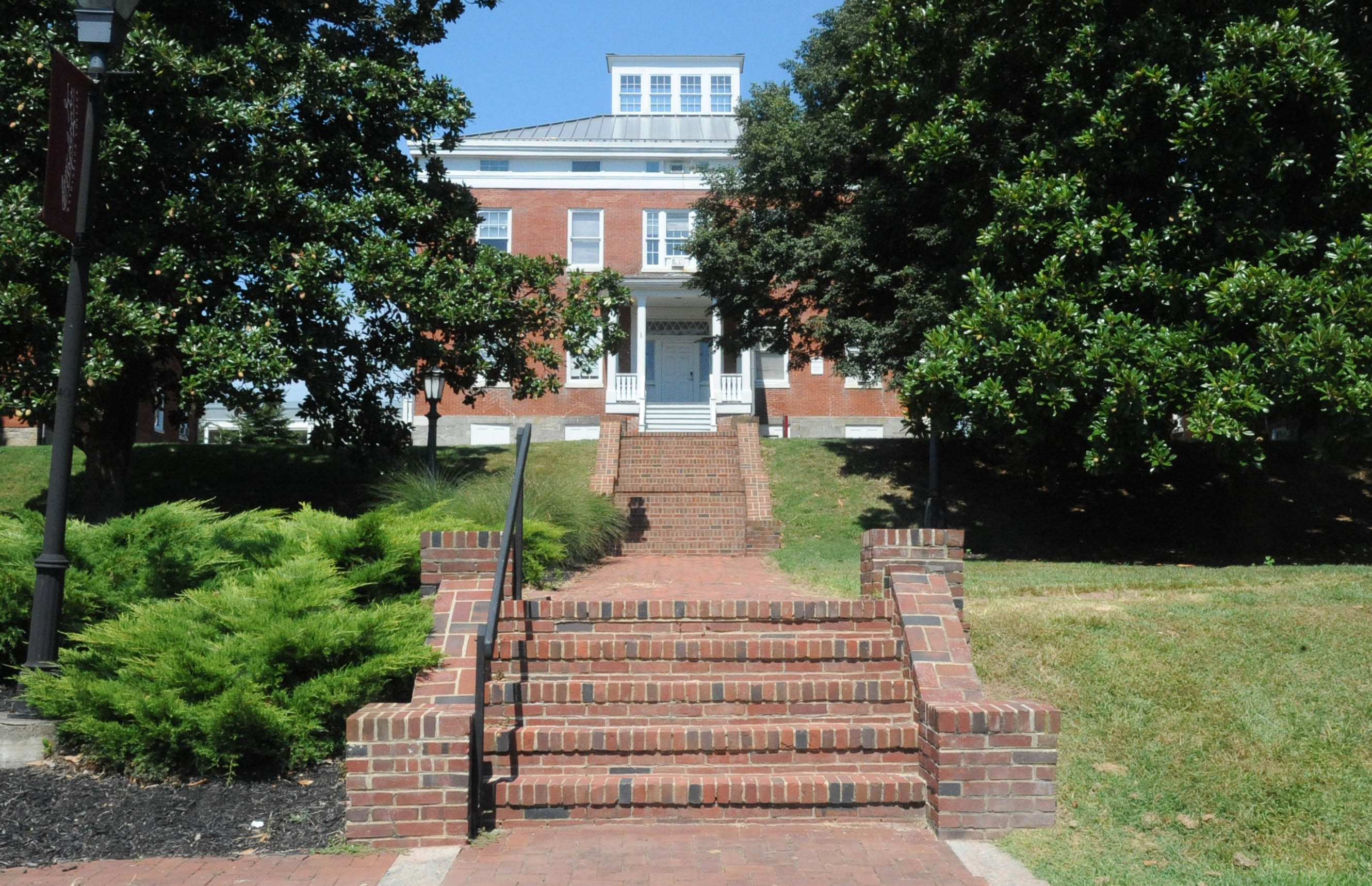
Middle Hall, the oldest building on campus, as seen in 2016.

Middle, East, and West Halls stand on the crest of a low hill (the terrace) at the center of campus. The halls occupy the location of the original college building, which opened in 1788, but burned down in January 1827. Middle Hall was the first to be constructed, in 1844, while East and West Halls were constructed in 1854. All three buildings are three-story brick structures which were designed by Elija Reynolds. They were listed on the National Register of Historic Places in 1979.

They now function as follows:

- East Hall – Used as an administrative building for Marketing & Communications.
- Middle Hall – Residence Hall for Kappa Sigma.
- West Hall – Residence Hall for Phi Delta Theta.

=== Academic Buildings ===
- Cromwell Hall
- Customs House

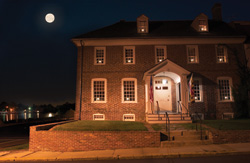
The Customs House, as seen in 2011.

Built in the 1740s by Samuel Massey, the Customs House was the property of Thomas Ringgold IV, a prominent merchant, slave trader, and lawyer in Kent County. Although the college used the Customs House during the period in which there were no buildings on campus, the college eventually came into possession of it in 1993, when Wilbur Ross Hubbard, who painstakingly restored the house to its colonial appearance, bequeathed it to the college upon his death. Ever since 2000, the house has served as the location of the Starr Center for the American Experience, which is still in operation, and under the leadership of Adam Goodheart.

- Daly Hall
- Decker Lab
- Dunning Hall
- Geospatial Innovation Program (GIP)
- Gibson Center for the Arts
- Goldstein Hall
- John S. Toll Science Center
- Labarre Arts Center
- MuSE Community Museum
- Rose O'Neill Literary House
- Semans-Griswold Environmental Hall
- Warehime School of Business (under construction)
- William Smith Hall

=== Administrative Buildings ===
- 508 and 510 Washington Avenue (unknown purpose)
- Bunting Hall
- Casey Academic Center
- East Hall

=== Residential Halls ===
There are 24 Residence Halls on campus. Only seniors can apply to live off campus unless they permanently reside nearby and fill out required exemption forms. The following is a list of the residential halls on campus.

==== First-Year Housing ====
- Caroline House
- Kent Hall
- Minta Martin Hall
- Reid Hall
- Queen Anne's House

==== Returning Students ====
- Chester Hall
- Corsica Hall
- Cullen Hall
- Morris Hall
- Sassafras Hall

==== Western Shore Independent Living ====
- Montgomery House
- Howard House
- Carroll House
- Garrett House
- Anne Arundel House
- Calvert House
- St. Mary's House
- Charles House
- Prince George's House

==== Greek Life Housing ====
- Middle Hall, home of Kappa Sigma.
- West Hall, home of Phi Delta Theta.
- Frederick House, home of Alpha Omicron Pi (part of Western Shore Independent Living).
- Allegany House, home of Zeta Tau Alpha (part of Western Shore Independent Living).

=== Resources and Amenities ===
- Alumni House
- Athey Park
- Brown Cottage
- Cain Athletic Center
- Casey Swim Center
- Foster House
- Franklin House
- Health and Consulting Services (in Queen Anne's House)
- Hillel House
- Hodson Boathouse
- Hodson Hall Commons
- Holstein House
- Hyson Lounge
- Hynson-Ringgold House
- Innovation Plant
- Johnson Fitness Center
- Lelia Hynson Pavillion
- Madison House
- Miller Library
- Nussbaum House
- Patrick Henry Fellowship House
- Publications House
- Public Safety (in Cullen Hall)
- The Adams House
- Roy Kirby Jr. Stadium
- Schottland Tennis Center

== People ==
=== Principals and presidents ===
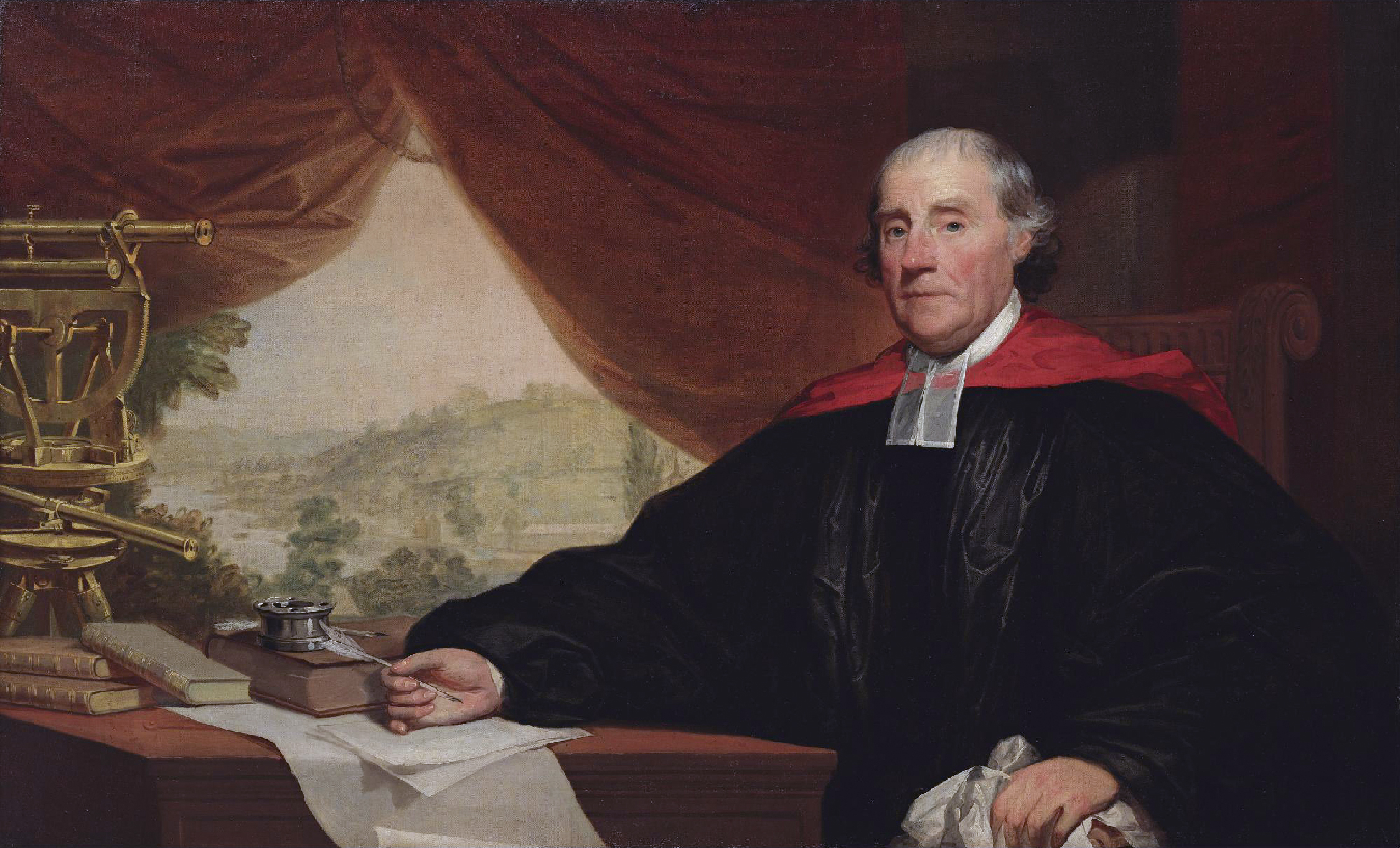
William Smith, the first president of Washington College

At least 32 people have been the principal or president of Washington College since 1782, four of whom have been interim. (Note: It is unknown who the principal was between 1805 and 1813.) Of the 32 presidents, only two, Joseph McLain and Bryan Matthews, were alumni of the college, and only one, Sheila Bair, was a woman. The college presidents have been drawn from various areas, including religion, military service, governmental service, and academia. Six Washington College presidents were ordained in the Episcopal Church or the Methodist Protestant Church before their term. Several were also the rector of either Emmanuel Parish or St. Paul's in Chestertown concurrent to their term as president. Washington College presidents have come from many parts of public life. Two were engaged in military service before their term, and four were in public service. A singular president, Kurt M. Landgraf, was working in the private sector before his term. Most of the remaining presidents were academics before becoming president of the college. Two were presidents of other colleges, seven were academic administrators, five were faculty members at other colleges, and three were faculty members at Washington College before their terms.

=== Alumni ===
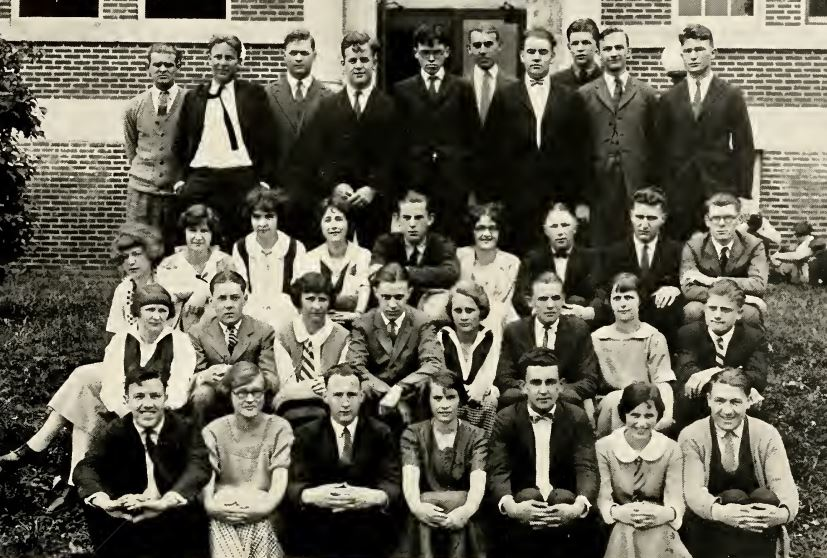
The class of 1927 sitting in front of William Smith Hall

Alumni of Washington College include two Governors of Maryland, a Governor of Delaware, four United States Senators, seven members of the United States House of Representatives, and nine State senators. Outside of the world of politics, nine alumni of Washington College played at least one game in Major League Baseball, including Jake Flowers, who was on two World Series winning teams. John Emory, the namesake of Emory University and Emory & Henry College, graduated from Washington College. Several alumni were successful writers including James M. Cain and Đỗ Nguyên Mai. Mary Adele France, who was the first president of St. Mary's College of Maryland, and Robert K. Crane, who discovered sodium-glucose cotransport, both found success in academia. H. Lawrence Culp Jr. has found success in business as the CEO of Danaher Corporation and the CEO of General Electric.
