= Alexander Scott =

Alexander Scott may refer to:

== Entertainment ==
- Alexander Scott (16th-century poet) (c. 1520–1582/83), Scottish poet
- Alexander Scott (20th-century poet) (1920–1989), Scottish poet, playwright and campaigning scholar
- Alexander Scott (painter) (1872–1925), British painter
- Alexander "Scotty" Scott, spy played by Bill Cosby in the television series I Spy

== Religion ==
- Alexander John Scott (1768–1840), British chaplain and friend of Horatio Nelson
- Alexander John Scott (principal) (1805–1866), Scottish dissident theologian, and first principal of Owens College, Manchester

== Science ==
- Alexander Scott (chemist) (1853–1947), Director of Scientific Research at the British Museum
- Alexander Scott (geologist) (1890–1951), Scottish geologist
- Alexander Walker Scott (1800–1883), Australian entomologist

== Other ==
- Alexander Scott (architect) (1920–2005), British architect
- Alexander Scott (British academic) (born 1967), British mathematician
- Alexander Scott (Medal of Honor) (1844–1923), American soldier
- Alexander Ritchie Scott (1874–1962), Scottish mathematician
- Alexander MacCallum Scott (1874–1928), British member of parliament for Glasgow Bridgeton, 1910–1922
- Sandy Scott (footballer) (Alexander MacNaughton Scott , 1922–1995), Scottish footballer

== See also ==
- Alex Scott (disambiguation)
- Al Scott (disambiguation)
- Scott Alexander (disambiguation)
