= Robert Scott =

Robert, Rob, Bob or Bobby Scott may refer to:

== Academics ==
- Robert Scott (master of Clare) (1569–1620), master of Clare College, Cambridge and dean of Rochester
- Robert Scott (philologist) (1811–1887), dean of Rochester, co-editor with Henry George Liddell of the Greek dictionary A Greek-English Lexicon
- Robert Forsyth Scott (1849–1933), mathematician, barrister and Master of St John's College, Cambridge
- Robert Scott (engineer) (1861–1930), New Zealand railway engineer and professor of engineering at Canterbury University College
- Bob Scott (ornithologist) (1938–2009), British ornithologist and conservationist
- Robert A. Scott, president of Adelphi University
- Robert E. Scott (born 1943), Columbia law professor
- Robert H. Scott III, American economist
- Robert L. Scott (1928–2018), American professor of communications studies

== Business ==
- Bob Scott (businessman) (born 1944), English businessman in South London
- Rob Scott (businessman) (born 1969), Australian CEO and rower
- Robert Scott (businessman, born 1822) (1822–1904), English businessman
- Robert Scott (businessman, born 1946), American businessman

== Entertainment ==
- Robert Scott (author) (c. 1941–2015), true crime author
- Bobby Scott (musician) (1937–1990), American musician, producer and songwriter
- Robert Scott (musician), member of New Zealand bands The Bats, The Clean, and The Magick Heads
- Robert Vere Scott (1877–c. 1944), Australian photographer
- Robert Adrian Scott (1911–1972), American screenwriter and film producer

== Military ==
=== British ===
- Robert Scott (VC recipient) (1874–1961), British Army soldier, recipient of the Victoria Cross in the Boer War (1899-1902)
- Robert Falcon Scott (1868–1912), British Royal Navy officer and Antarctic explorer
- Robert George Scott (1857–1918), English soldier in the South African Army during World War I, recipient of the Victoria Cross

=== United States ===
- Robert B. Scott (1845–1908), United States Army soldier and Medal of Honor recipient, in the American Indian Wars
- Robert Lee Scott Jr. (1908–2006), United States Army Air Forces flying ace in World War II
- Robert R. Scott (1915–1941), United States Navy sailor killed during the attack on Pearl Harbor, Medal of Honor recipient
- Robert Ray Scott (1920–2006), US Air Force officer
- Robert S. Scott (1913–1999), US Army officer in the southwest Pacific during World War II, later Korean War, Medal of Honor recipient

== Politics ==
=== U.S. ===
- Robert Eden Scott (1808–1862), Virginia politician
- Robert Kingston Scott (1826–1900), governor of South Carolina
- Robert W. Scott (1929–2009), governor of North Carolina
- Robert W. Scott (1861–1929), North Carolina state representative
- Bob Scott (mayor) (born 1951), mayor of Sioux City, Iowa
- Bobby Scott (politician) (born 1947), American Democratic member of congress from Virginia

=== U.K. ===
- Robert Scott (lawyer) (died 1592), Scottish administrator
- Robert Scott (1705–1780) of Dunninald, member of parliament (MP) for Forfarshire 1733–34
- Robert Scott (MP for Huntingdonshire), MP for Huntingdonshire
- Robert Scott (died 1808), British politician
- Robert Wellbeloved Scott (1803–1856), British Liberal MP for Walsall
- Robert Heatlie Scott (1905–1982), British civil servant
- Donald Scott (politician) (Robert Donald Scott, 1901–1974), British Conservative MP for Wansbeck 1940–1945

=== Other countries ===
- Robert Scott (colonial administrator) (1903–1968), colonial administrator
- Robert Scott (Manitoba politician), Canadian politician of the Christian Heritage Party
- Robert Scott (New Zealand politician) (1854–1944), New Zealand politician
- Bob Scott (Queensland politician) (1931–2011), Queensland politician
- Bob Scott (New South Wales politician) (born 1943)
- Robert Scott (public servant) (1841–1922), first secretary of the Australian Government Postmaster-General's Department

== Sports ==
=== Baseball ===
- Bob Scott (baseball) (1892–1947), American Negro leagues baseball outfielder
- Robert Scott (first baseman) (born 1917), American Negro leagues baseball first baseman
- Robert Scott (pitcher) (1931–2020), American Negro leagues baseball pitcher

=== Football and rugby ===
- Bobby Scott (American football) (born 1949), Tennessee Volunteers and New Orleans Saints quarterback
- Bob Scott (Australian footballer) (1894–1990), Australian rules footballer for Fitzroy
- Bobby Scott (Australian footballer) (1887–1957), Australian rules footballer for Richmond
- Robert Scott (Australian footballer) (born 1969), Australian rules footballer for Geelong and North Melbourne
- Bob Scott (umpire) (1901–1956), Australian rules football umpire
- Bob Scott (footballer, born 1953), English footballer
- Rob Scott (footballer) (born 1973), English footballer and manager
- Bob Scott (rugby) (1921–2012), New Zealand All Blacks rugby union player
- Robert Scott (footballer, born 1870) (1870–?), Scottish international footballer
- Robert Scott (footballer, born 1964), Scottish footballer
- Robert Scott (footballer, born 1990), Scottish footballer
- Bert Scott (Robert Scott, 1930–2015), Scottish footballer
- Robert Scott (rugby union, born 1882) (1882–1950), Scottish rugby union player
- Robert Scott (rugby union, born 1872) (1872–1947), Scottish rugby union player

=== Other sports ===
- Robert Scott (cricketer) (1909–1957), cricketer for Oxford University and Sussex
- Robert Scott (deer stalker) (1903–1981), on Mar Lodge Estate, Aberdeenshire
- Bob Scott (racing driver) (1928–1954), from California
- Rob Scott (businessman) (born 1969), Australian rower and businessman
- Robert H. Scott (lacrosse coach) (c. 1930–2016), Johns Hopkins lacrosse coach, 1955–1974
- Joseph Scott (bobsleigh) (Robert Joseph Scott, 1922–2000), American Olympic bobsledder
- Robert Scott (cyclist) (born 1998), British cyclist
- Bob Scott (hammer thrower), Scottish hammer thrower

== Other ==
- Robert Scott (engraver) (1777–1841), Scottish engraver
- Robert Scott (moderator) (1897–1975), Scottish minister and religious author
- Robert Falcon Scott (1868–1912), British Royal Navy officer and Antarctic explorer
- Robert Henry Scott (1833–1916), Irish meteorologist
- Robert K. Scott (diplomat) (born 1963), American diplomat
- Robert Leonard Ewing Scott (1897–1987), American convicted murderer
- Robert Sinclair Scott (1843–1905), Scottish ship builder

== See also ==
- Bert Scott (disambiguation)
