= Johns Hopkins–Maryland lacrosse rivalry =

American intercollegiate sports rivalry

Johns Hopkins–Maryland

Men's lacrosse series
- First meeting: 1895 or 1924
- Last meeting: April 18, 2026
- Next meeting: TBD
- All-time record: 70–51-1 or 77-51-1 (JHU leads) (Note: The larger figure used in Johns Hopkins records includes results from seven games before Maryland fielded a varsity team in 1924. Maryland does not count the results of those games.)
- Johns Hopkins recognizes the 7 games played before Maryland became a varsity program in 1924, Maryland however, does not.

Women's lacrosse series
- First meeting: 1979
- Last meeting: March 26, 2026
- Next meeting: TBD
- All-time record: 28–0 (MD leads)

The Johns Hopkins–Maryland lacrosse rivalry is an intercollegiate rivalry between the Johns Hopkins Blue Jays, which represent Johns Hopkins University, and the Maryland Terrapins, which represent the University of Maryland. The most prominent event has been the men's lacrosse series, which is widely regarded as one of the greatest rivalries in the sport. More than 122 contests in the series have been played since the schools first met in 1895. The competition is intensified by each program's status as a traditional lacrosse powerhouse. As such, the game has often held national championship implications, and twice the teams played to represent the United States in the Olympics.

The schools currently meet only in lacrosse, as all other Johns Hopkins athletics fall under NCAA Division III and all Maryland athletics are Division I. From the late 19th into the 20th century, however, their football teams also competed regularly. More recently, the schools have played in women's lacrosse, having met annually since the year 2000, excluding 2020 when the remainder of the season was canceled due to the COVID-19 pandemic.

== NCAA alignment ==
In 1973, the National Collegiate Athletic Association instituted a three-tier classification system, which created Division I, Division II, and Division III. The third tier, Division III, is the one in which no athletic scholarships are awarded to student-athletes. Johns Hopkins, as a perennial lacrosse power, chose to continue competition in Division I in that sport, while all of its other athletic teams were relegated to Division III. In 2004, the NCAA upheld the decision to allow Division III schools to "play up", and grant scholarships, in a sport at the Division I level (usually ice hockey). Since Maryland competes strictly at the Division I level, the two schools currently meet only in men's and women's lacrosse.

== Men's lacrosse ==
Johns Hopkins–Maryland lacrosse rivalry
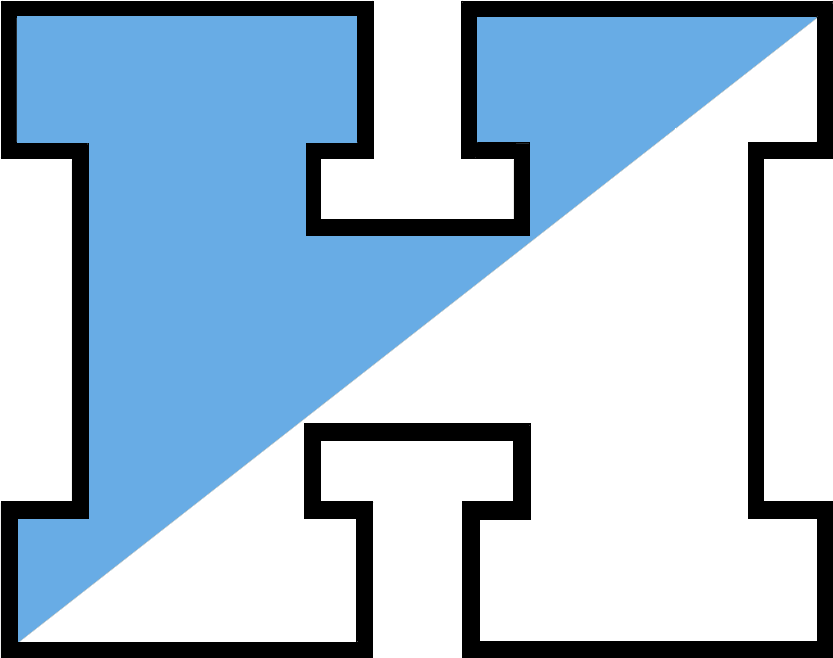
- Johns Hopkins Blue Jays Maryland Terrapins
- First meeting: 1895*; Johns Hopkins 10, Maryland 0; 1924; Maryland 4, Johns Hopkins 2
- Latest meeting: April 18, 2026; Johns Hopkins 9, Maryland 8
- Next meeting: TBD

Statistics
- Total meetings: 128* or 121
- All-time series: Johns Hopkins leads, 77–51–1* or 70-51-1
- Largest victory: Johns Hopkins, 17–0 (1919)* Maryland, 22-7 (2022)
- Longest win streak: Johns Hopkins, 15 (1977–1986)
- Current win streak: Johns Hopkins, 1 (2026–present)
- *Johns Hopkins recognizes the 7 games played before Maryland became a varsity program in 1924, Maryland however, does not.

=== Background ===
Both schools call the rivalry the greatest and most historic in men's lacrosse. Sports Illustrated ranked it among the best all-time college rivalries, and before the teams' 100th meeting, called it "the equivalent of Michigan–Ohio State in football." A 2003 Harris Interactive poll found that Marylanders considered it the state's fourth biggest rivalry after the Cowboys–Redskins, Ravens–Redskins, and Duke–Maryland. The Hopkins–Maryland all-time record differs based upon whether games played before Maryland had a varsity team are counted. Johns Hopkins recognizes those games and records the series as 71–43–1 in its own favor. Maryland, however, recognizes only games played since the formation of their varsity team in 1924, which puts the all-time record at 64–43–1, also in favor of Hopkins.

The rivalry, which is the oldest in the sport, is fueled by history, competitiveness, and cultural implication. Both schools are located in the state of Maryland, a historical hotbed for lacrosse, and have traditionally been two of the sport's powerhouses. Many of the opposing players have had past associations in grade school, high school, or youth club sports. Hopkins' former coach and former player Dave Pietramala said, "Everybody knew each other; we had all played together at some point or another. It was a fierce, intense game and there was no love lost on the field." Additionally, Johns Hopkins is a private university, while Maryland is a public institution. Former Terrapins coach Dick Edell said:

"To get the juices flowing before the game, [we'd tell the Maryland] kids that it was the blue-collar guys against the future executives—that this was their only chance to get them before they got into the real world. Plus, you have all the kids who came from the same high school, or worked the camps together, so there was that closeness that you have to live with for the other 364 days, no matter who wins."

=== Early years ===
The two teams first played in 1895 and met six more times through 1923. In those early matches, Johns Hopkins scored a combined sixty points to Maryland's three. In 1924, Maryland fielded its first varsity-level lacrosse team, which defeated Hopkins, 4–2, but the United States Intercollegiate Lacrosse Association (USILA) awarded the Blue Jays the co-national championship (along with Syracuse). Since that season, the teams have met annually with the exception of a two-year hiatus due to World War II. Johns Hopkins won three straight national titles from 1926 to 1928, where each season culminated with a victory over Maryland. In 1928, Maryland had a perfect 9–0 record until Johns Hopkins defeated the Terps in the season finale, 6–3. At season's end, a single-elimination tournament was held to determine which team would represent the United States in a trial lacrosse competition during the Summer Olympics. Maryland defeated Navy and Rutgers to advance to the final game, where they were again bested by Johns Hopkins.

The following season, the Terrapins embarked upon a three-year run in which they lost only four games, and they defeated the Blue Jays each season including a shutout, 6–0, in 1930. In 1932, however, Hopkins defeated Maryland twice during the regular season and once more in a postseason game to decide participation in the Olympics. Between 1930 and 1934, the Blue Jays won three national championships and lost only two games, both of which were to the Terrapins. Maryland captured national titles in 1936, 1937, and 1939. That year, however, Hopkins managed to break a four-game losing streak against them. The Terrapins won the 1940 title by beating the undefeated Blue Jays, 7–6, in the series' first game decided by one goal. Maryland finished the season with a perfect 10–0 record. The following year, Hopkins finished 12–0 and captured the national championship after a convincing victory over Maryland, 10–3. Johns Hopkins secured four more national titles from 1947 to 1950, and defeated Maryland each year, three times by a margin of at least six goals.

Several days before the game in 1947, Hopkins supporters stole "Testudo", a 300-pound bronze statue of a diamondback terrapin, from the Maryland campus. Approximately 200 Terrapins fans drove to Baltimore to retrieve it, and a riot erupted before the city police intervened. The Hopkins dean ordered the students to return the statue, which they did after painting a blue 'H' on its back.

=== Maryland dominance ===
In the 1950s, the two teams won a combined six national championships, with Maryland dominating the first part of the decade and Johns Hopkins the latter. Between 1951 and 1956, Maryland posted a 5–0–1 record against Hopkins, with three games won by at least six points. The Terps won consecutive national titles in 1955 and 1956, while posting a combined record of 21–0. In 1957, the Blue Jays snapped the Terrapins' 31-game winning streak with an upset win, 15–10. Two years later, both teams shared the national title with Army. Between 1955 and 1959, Maryland compiled a 48–3 record, with all three losses at the hands of Johns Hopkins.

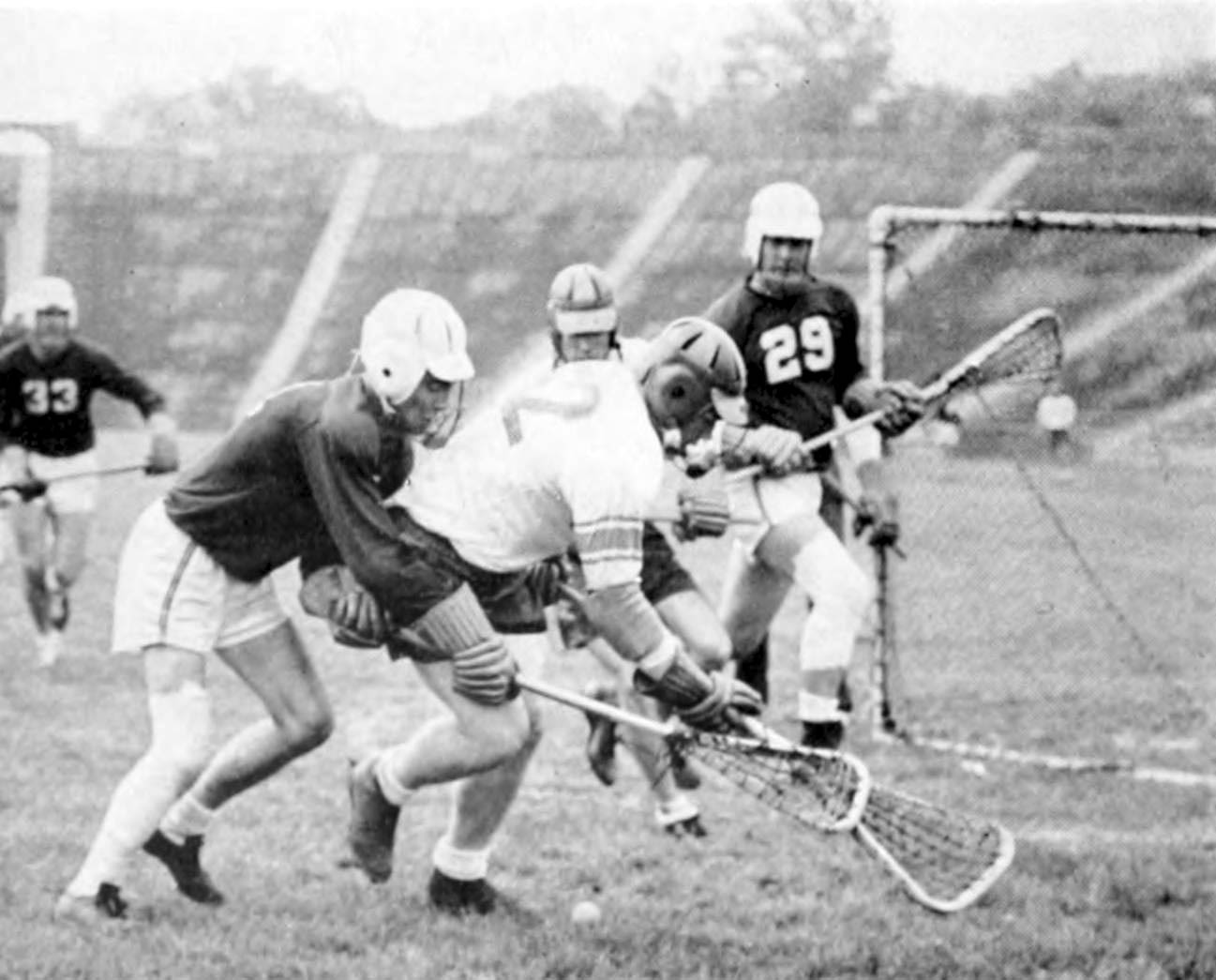
Maryland and Hopkins players scramble for the ball during the 1955 game.

In 1960, Navy became the first team other than Hopkins to defeat Maryland since 1954. That same year marked the start of Navy's eight-year national championship streak that lasted through 1967. That season, Navy beat Maryland 10–8, before traveling to Homewood Field. There, Johns Hopkins upset Navy, 9–6, for the first time in their last ten meetings. The Blue Jays and Terrapins met for the season finale where Hopkins needed a victory to win the national title outright. Maryland acted as a spoiler, however, and beat Johns Hopkins, 9–5, to take a share of the championship. Hopkins went on to win or share the next four national titles.

=== Advent of the NCAA tournament ===
In 1971, the NCAA replaced the USILA as the awarding authority for the men's lacrosse championship with the introduction of a tournament. Since then, the Blue Jays and Terrapins have appeared in the finals a combined 27 times and have met each other in the finals three times. In 1972, Maryland beat Johns Hopkins in the regular season, 13–12, to earn the number-one seed. The two teams met again in the semifinals, where Hopkins eliminated Maryland, 9–6, and advanced to the finals before losing to Virginia by one goal. The following two years, Hopkins and Maryland met in the finals.

In 1973, Maryland routed Hopkins during the regular season, 17–4. That year's Terrapins, led by future Hall of Fame inductee and four-time All-American Frank Urso, are considered one of the all-time best college lacrosse teams and averaged almost 18 goals a game. When the teams met in the championship game, however, the Blue Jays employed a possession game to offset Maryland's offensive firepower, and the first shot on goal did not take place until 8:38. At halftime, Johns Hopkins had taken a 5–2 lead. Time expired with the score tied, 9–9, which forced the game into overtime. Urso scored for the Terrapins to take a 10–9 lead and Maryland goalie Bill O'Donnell made several impressive saves to secure the win. (Note: Sudden death overtime had not yet been implemented in NCAA play.)

The following year, Maryland was again named the top-seed, despite having lost to second-seed Johns Hopkins during the regular season. In the championship game, Hopkins quickly took the lead, led by Hall of Fame attackman Jack Thomas and entered halftime with a 10–4 advantage. In the second half, Maryland outscored them 8–7, but the effort fell short. In 1975, Maryland defeated Hopkins, 19–11, before winning the national title, and won again the following year, 21–13, on their way to finish as national championship runners-up after an overtime loss to Cornell in the final. In 1977, the Blue Jays edged the Terrapins, 21–20, in the regular season and began a run in the series. Hopkins eliminated Maryland in the tournament semifinals in both 1977 and 1978, before beating them in the 1979 championship game at home in College Park, Maryland. During that game, the Blue Jays were able to limit the Terrapins' second all-time leading scorer and 1979 attackman of the year Bob Boneillo. During the 1970s, Maryland participated in six NCAA title games, including four in a row from 1973 to 1976. During that span, the Terps won two national titles and lost four.

=== Hopkins dominance ===
During the 1980s, Johns Hopkins dominated the series, winning 12 of 13 games, including nine by an average margin of 5.6 points. During this period Hopkins, led by head coach Henry Ciccarone, won three national titles. By 1987, Maryland's fourth-year head coach Dick Edell had helped revitalize the Terrapins as a national power. Maryland posted an 11–0 record during the regular season, where the win over Hopkins, 11–7, was the only game decided by less than six goals. In the NCAA tournament, Maryland defeated Penn in the quarterfinals, 12–8, and advanced to again meet Hopkins in the semifinals. Despite having recorded its first three-loss season in over a decade, and having edged North Carolina in the quarterfinals, the Blue Jays upset the Terrapins, 13–8. Hopkins, led by goalkeeper Quint Kessenich, advanced to win the national title against then undefeated Cornell in the final.

=== Relative parity ===
In 1995, Johns Hopkins narrowly retained an undefeated regular season by winning four one-goal games, which included an edging of Maryland, 16–15. Hopkins entered the tournament as the number-one seed, and again met Maryland in the semifinals. Edell helped guide the Terps to an early lead, and they ended the half with an advantage, 10–4, with the final result a rout, 16–8. The performance of Maryland goalie Brian Dougherty earned him the title of the tournament's Most Outstanding Player, despite the Terps' loss in the final against Syracuse.

The following season, Maryland earned a number-two seeding after defeating Hopkins, 12–9. The teams met again in the tournament quarterfinals, where, playing at home, Hopkins gained a 7–0 lead against heavily favored Maryland. The Terrapins rallied, but the Blue Jays held them off to preserve victory, 9–7. In 1998 at Homewood Field, Hopkins upset first-ranked Maryland, 10–6 during the regular season. This time when they met in the tournament quarterfinals, Maryland had the homefield advantage at Byrd Stadium. The Terps led 10–6 in the fourth quarter before the Blue Jays rallied to force overtime. Maryland, however, won the ensuing faceoff and scored after several shots on goal, never allowing Hopkins to gain possession of the ball. The Terps eventually advanced to the final, where they were defeated by Princeton.

=== Recent years ===
From 2001 to 2003, each match-up was decided by one goal. Maryland won coach Dick Edell's final, and Hopkins coach Dave Pietramala's first, game of the series in 2001. The Blue Jays won the following two seasons, with both games decided in overtime. In 2004, the teams played their 100th anniversary game and both sides wore special "throwback" jerseys. Hopkins scored five times before the first television timeout, then took an 8–1 first period lead on the way to a victory, 14–10. Hopkins extended their streak to four wins in 2005, before Maryland's new head coach Dave Cottle took away his first victory in 2006. In 2009, the teams played in the inaugural Day of Rivals double-header, where Hopkins preserved victory, 10–9, when a final-second Maryland shot on the crease was deflected. The two met for the event again in 2010, with Maryland coming out on top, 10–9, due in part to a perfect four-for-four extra-man offense.

The rivalry became a conference matchup in the 2014–15 academic year when both schools joined the new men's lacrosse league formed by Maryland's new all-sports home, the Big Ten Conference, with Johns Hopkins as an associate member. The first Big Ten game between the two was an upset for Johns Hopkins 15–12 with a rematch in NCAA semi-finals May 22, 2015 at Lincoln Financial Field in Philadelphia which went to Maryland 12–11.

Starting in 2015, the regular season winner of the game has been awarded "The Rivalry Trophy". It is a crab-shaped trophy, crafted by Sandtown Millworks, made using reclaimed wood from Baltimore. It weighs 25 pounds and measures 32 inches wide and 22 inches tall.

The 2020 game scheduled for April 25, 2020 at Baltimore, Maryland was canceled by the NCAA due to the COVID-19 pandemic. Maryland was 5–1 after their last game against Albany on March 7, 2020, while Hopkins was 2–4 after their OT win against Mt. St. Mary's on March 10, 2020. In April 2020, athletic director Jennifer S. Baker announced Hopkins and head coach Dave Pietramala mutually agreed to part ways as the university looked to "move the program in a different direction," after Pietramala had coached the Jays for 20 years and set a career record of 207–93."

=== Rival accomplishments ===
The following summarizes the accomplishments of the two programs.

Team	Johns Hopkins Blue Jays	Maryland Terrapins
Pre-NCAA National Titles	35	9
NCAA National Titles	9	4
NCAA Final Four Appearances	29	28
NCAA Tournament Appearances	47	42
NCAA Tournament Record	71–38	63–39
Conference Tournament Titles	2	6
Conference Championships	2	35
Tewaarton Award Recipients	1	3
Lt. Raymond Enners Award Recipients	11	5
Consensus First Team All-Americans	184	127
All-time Program Record	993–356–15	839–276–4
All-time Winning Percentage	.739	.752

=== Results ===
Johns Hopkins victories	Maryland victories	Tie games

No.	Date	Location	Winner	Score
1	1895	Maryland	Johns Hopkins	10–0
2	1896	Maryland	Johns Hopkins	8–0
3	1897	Maryland	Johns Hopkins	10–0
4	1897	Maryland	Johns Hopkins	7–0
5	1919	Maryland	Johns Hopkins	17–0
6	1920	Maryland	Johns Hopkins	4–1
7	1923	Baltimore, Maryland	Johns Hopkins	4–2
8	1924	College Park, Maryland	Maryland	4–2
9	1925	College Park, Maryland	Maryland	3–1
10	1926	College Park, Maryland	Johns Hopkins	10–3
11	1927	College Park, Maryland	Johns Hopkins	8–2
12	1928	College Park, Maryland	Johns Hopkins	6–1
13	1928	College Park, Maryland	Johns Hopkins	6–3
14	1929	College Park, Maryland	Maryland	6–2
15	1930	College Park, Maryland	Maryland	6–0
16	1931	College Park, Maryland	Maryland	8–6
17	1932	Baltimore, Maryland	Johns Hopkins	7–3
18	1932	College Park, Maryland	Johns Hopkins	7–5
19	1933	College Park, Maryland	Johns Hopkins	6–3
20	1934	College Park, Maryland	Johns Hopkins	8–5
21	1935	College Park, Maryland	Maryland	4–2
22	1936	College Park, Maryland	Maryland	9–4
23	1937	College Park, Maryland	Maryland	9–6
24	1938	College Park, Maryland	Maryland	12–6
25	1939	College Park, Maryland	Johns Hopkins	6–3
26	1940	College Park, Maryland	Maryland	7–6
27	1941	Baltimore, Maryland	Johns Hopkins	10–3
28	1942	College Park, Maryland	Johns Hopkins	7–5
29	1943	College Park, Maryland	Maryland	5–4
30	1946	Baltimore, Maryland	Maryland	7–6
31	1947	College Park, Maryland	Johns Hopkins	15–6
32	1948	Baltimore, Maryland	Johns Hopkins	10–8
33	1949	Baltimore, Maryland	Johns Hopkins	14–6
34	1950	College Park, Maryland	Johns Hopkins	10–4
35	1951	College Park, Maryland	Maryland	6–1
36	1952	Baltimore, Maryland	Tie	10–10
37	1953	College Park, Maryland	Maryland	8–6
38	1954	Baltimore, Maryland	Maryland	17–4
39	1955	College Park, Maryland	Maryland	11–5
40	1956	Baltimore, Maryland	Maryland	13–6
41	1957	College Park, Maryland	Johns Hopkins	15–10
42	1958	Baltimore, Maryland	Johns Hopkins	11–10
43	1959	College Park, Maryland	Johns Hopkins	20–8
44	1960	Baltimore, Maryland	Johns Hopkins	13–7

No.	Date	Location	Winner	Score
45	1961	College Park, Maryland	Maryland	12–7
46	1962	Baltimore, Maryland	Maryland	16–15
47	1963	College Park, Maryland	Maryland	13–11
48	1964	Baltimore, Maryland	Maryland	17–12
49	1965	College Park, Maryland	Johns Hopkins	11–8
50	1966	Baltimore, Maryland	Maryland	12–8
51	1967	College Park, Maryland	Maryland	9–5
52	1968	Baltimore, Maryland	Johns Hopkins	10–8
53	1969	College Park, Maryland	Johns Hopkins	14–8
54	1970	Baltimore, Maryland	Johns Hopkins	7–4
55	1971	College Park, Maryland	Maryland	8–5
56	1972	Baltimore, Maryland	Maryland	13–12
57	1972	College Park, Maryland	Johns Hopkins	9–6
58	1973	College Park, Maryland	#1 Maryland	17–4
59	1973	Philadelphia	#1 Maryland	10–9^{2OT}
60	1974	Baltimore, Maryland	#3 Johns Hopkins	17–13
61	1974	Piscataway, New Jersey	#2 Johns Hopkins	17–12
62	1975	College Park, Maryland	#5 Maryland	19–11
63	1976	Baltimore, Maryland	#2 Maryland	21–13
64	1977	College Park, Maryland	#3 Johns Hopkins	21–20
65	1977	Charlottesville, Virginia	#2 Johns Hopkins	22–12
66	1978	Baltimore, Maryland	#3 Johns Hopkins	19–13
67	1978	Piscataway, New Jersey	#2 Johns Hopkins	17–11
68	1979	College Park, Maryland	#1 Johns Hopkins	13–12
69	1979	College Park, Maryland	#1 Johns Hopkins	15–9
70	1980	Baltimore, Maryland	#2 Johns Hopkins	15–6
71	1981	College Park, Maryland	#1 Johns Hopkins	12–8
72	1981	Baltimore, Maryland	#1 Johns Hopkins	19–14
73	1982	Baltimore, Maryland	#4 Johns Hopkins	14–6
74	1982	Baltimore, Maryland	#3 Johns Hopkins	14–9
75	1983	College Park, Maryland	#2 Johns Hopkins	14–7
76	1984	Baltimore, Maryland	#2 Johns Hopkins	16–10
77	1985	College Park, Maryland	#1 Johns Hopkins	8–7^{OT}
78	1986	Baltimore, Maryland	#2 Johns Hopkins	14–9
79	1987	College Park, Maryland	#1 Maryland	11–7
80	1987	Piscataway, New Jersey	#4 Johns Hopkins	13–8
81	1988	Baltimore, Maryland	#2 Johns Hopkins	11–7
82	1989	College Park, Maryland	#1 Johns Hopkins	10–9
83	1990	Baltimore, Maryland	#12 Johns Hopkins	17–11
84	1991	College Park, Maryland	#6 Maryland	11–8
85	1992	Baltimore, Maryland	#7 Maryland	13–9
86	1993	College Park, Maryland	#4 Johns Hopkins	19–11
87	1994	Baltimore, Maryland	#6 Johns Hopkins	12–10
88	1995	College Park, Maryland	#1 Johns Hopkins	16–15

No.	Date	Location	Winner	Score
89	1995	College Park, Maryland	#4 Maryland	16–8
90	1996	Baltimore, Maryland	#1 Maryland	12–9
91	1996	Baltimore, Maryland	#7 Johns Hopkins	9–7
92	1997	College Park, Maryland	#5 Johns Hopkins	13–9
93	1998	Baltimore, Maryland	#6 Johns Hopkins	10–6
94	1998	College Park, Maryland	#5 Maryland	11–10^{OT}
95	1999	College Park, Maryland	#3 Johns Hopkins	13–3
96	2000	Baltimore, Maryland	#8 Johns Hopkins	20–11
97	2001	College Park, Maryland	#5 Maryland	10–9
98	2002	Baltimore, Maryland	#3 Johns Hopkins	9–8^{OT}
99	2003	College Park, Maryland	#1 Johns Hopkins	6–5^{OT}
100	2004	Baltimore, Maryland	#1 Johns Hopkins	14–10
101	2005	College Park, Maryland	#1 Johns Hopkins	11–6
102	2006	Baltimore, Maryland	#6 Maryland	11–4
103	2007	College Park, Maryland	#9 Johns Hopkins	8–7^{OT}
104	2008	Baltimore, Maryland	#13 Johns Hopkins	10–4
105	2009	Baltimore, Maryland	#9 Johns Hopkins	10–9
106	2010	Baltimore, Maryland	#4 Maryland	10–9
107	2011	College Park, Maryland	#3 Johns Hopkins	12–11^{OT}
108	2012	Baltimore, Maryland	#9 Maryland	9–6
109	2012	Annapolis, Maryland	#10 Maryland	11–5
110	2013	College Park, Maryland	#15 Johns Hopkins	7–4
111	2014	Baltimore, Maryland	#9 Johns Hopkins	11–6
112	2015	College Park, Maryland	Johns Hopkins	15–12
113	2015	Philadelphia, Pennsylvania	#7 Maryland	12–11
114	2016	Baltimore, Maryland	#3 Maryland	11–8
115	2017	College Park, Maryland	#5 Maryland	12–5
116	2018	Baltimore, Maryland	#3 Maryland	8–7^{3OT}
117	2018	Ann Arbor, Michigan	#7 Johns Hopkins	13–10
118	2019	College Park, Maryland	#20 Johns Hopkins	16–11
119	2019	Piscataway, New Jersey	#16 Johns Hopkins	12–7
120	2021	College Park, Maryland	#3 Maryland	18–10
121	2021	Baltimore, Maryland	#1 Maryland	14–13
122	2021	University Park, Pennsylvania	#1 Maryland	12–10
123	2022	Baltimore, Maryland	#1 Maryland	22–7
124	2022	College Park, Maryland	#1 Maryland	16–11
125	2023	College Park, Maryland	#7 Johns Hopkins	12–11
126	2023	Baltimore, Maryland	#7 Maryland	14–9
127	2024	Baltimore, Maryland	#3 Johns Hopkins	7–5
128	2025	College Park, Maryland	#3 Maryland	11–8
129	2026	Baltimore, Maryland	#12 Johns Hopkins	9–8
Series: Johns Hopkins leads 77–51–1

== Women's lacrosse ==
Johns Hopkins–Maryland women's lacrosse rivalry
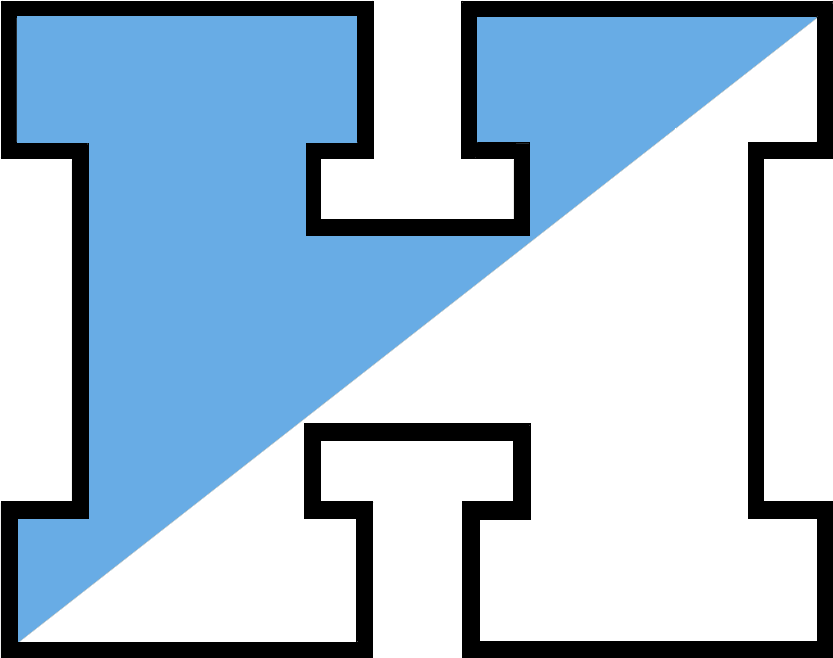
- Johns Hopkins Blue Jays Maryland Terrapins
- First meeting: 1979; Maryland 17, Johns Hopkins 1
- Latest meeting: April 24, 2026; Maryland 15, Johns Hopkins 14
- Next meeting: TBD

Statistics
- Total meetings: 29
- All-time series: Maryland leads, 29–0
- Largest victory: Maryland, 24–5 (2001)
- Longest win streak: Maryland, 29 (1979–present)
- Current win streak: Maryland, 29 (1979–present)

The Johns Hopkins and Maryland women's lacrosse teams first played in 1979 in Arnold, Maryland, a game which the Lady Terps won handily, 17–1. They did not meet again until after the Johns Hopkins women's team was promoted from Division III to Division I in 1999. The following year, the teams met and played each season through 2009, but did not play again until 2015. As of the last meeting between the teams in 2026, the Maryland women held a perfect record against Hopkins, having won all 29 meetings by a combined margin of 438–253.

Hopkins and Maryland became conference rivals in women's lacrosse in the 2016–17 school year when Hopkins joined the Big Ten for that sport. The first Big Ten game between the two was accordingly played in 2017.

=== Rival accomplishments ===
The following summarizes the accomplishments of the two programs.

Team	Johns Hopkins Blue Jays	Maryland Terrapins
Pre-NCAA National Titles	0	1
NCAA National Titles	0	14
NCAA Final Four Appearances	5*	29
NCAA Tournament Appearances	17*	41
NCAA Tournament Record	8–17*	81–27
Conference Tournament Titles	2	15
Conference Championships	9	17
Tewaarton Award Recipients	0	9
Consensus First Team All-Americans	17	104
All-time Program Record	445–285–4	821–172–3
All-time Winning Percentage	.609	.826

- 9 of Johns Hopkins's NCAA tournament appearances and all 5 Final Four appearances occurred at the NCAA Division III level

=== Results ===
Johns Hopkins victories	Maryland victories	Tie games

No.	Date	Location	Winner	Score
1	1979	Arnold, Maryland	Maryland	17–1
2	2000	Baltimore, Maryland	#1 Maryland	16–3
3	2001	College Park, Maryland	#1 Maryland	24–5
4	2002	Baltimore, Maryland	#13 Maryland	13–8
5	2003	College Park, Maryland	#2 Maryland	19–4
6	2004	Baltimore, Maryland	#7 Maryland	14–11
7	2005	College Park, Maryland	#9 Maryland	12–10
8	2006	Baltimore, Maryland	#7 Maryland	14–11
9	2007	College Park, Maryland	#4 Maryland	22–15
10	2008	Baltimore, Maryland	#2 Maryland	16–8
11	2009	College Park, Maryland	#2 Maryland	18–12
12	2015	Baltimore, Maryland	#1 Maryland	17–9
13	2016	College Park, Maryland	#1 Maryland	10–8
14	2016	College Park, Maryland	#1 Maryland	14–8
15	2017	College Park, Maryland	#1 Maryland	17–4
16	2017	College Park, Maryland	#1 Maryland	19–16

No.	Date	Location	Winner	Score
17	2018	Baltimore, Maryland	#2 Maryland	15–5
18	2018	Ann Arbor, Michigan	#2 Maryland	16–11
19	2019	College Park, Maryland	#2 Maryland	19–12
20	2021	Baltimore, Maryland	#9 Maryland	9–8^{OT}
21	2021	College Park, Maryland	#11 Maryland	9–8
22	2021	University Park, Pennsylvania	#13 Maryland	8–7
23	2022	Baltimore, Maryland	#8 Maryland	17–6
24	2022	Piscataway, New Jersey	#3 Maryland	14–6
25	2023	College Park, Maryland	#10 Maryland	13–12
26	2024	Baltimore, Maryland	#4 Maryland	13–8
27	2025	College Park, Maryland	#7 Maryland	13–11
28	2026	Baltimore, Maryland	#1 Maryland	15–12
29	2026	Ann Arbor, Michigan	#4 Maryland	15–14^{OT}
Series: Maryland leads 29–0
