= Allan Scott =

Alan, Allen or Allan Scott may refer to:

== People ==
=== Sportsmen ===
- Alan Scott (footballer, born 1900) (1900–1982), Australian rules ruckman for St Kilda (1929–30)
- Alan Scott (footballer, born 1907) (1907–1973), Australian rules player for St Kilda (1924–26)
- Allan Scott (footballer) (1910–after 1934), English inside right
- Alan Scott (rugby league) (1939–2018), Australian second-row forward
- Allan Scott (hurdler) (born 1982), Scottish Olympian in 2008

=== Writers ===
- Alan Scott (RAF officer) (1883–1922), British Army and Royal Air Force group captain and memoirist
- Allan Scott (American screenwriter) (1906–1995), American scenarist of So Proudly We Hail!
- Murray Allan Scott (1932–2020), birth name of Canadian journalist Allan Fotheringham
- Alan B. Scott (1932–2021), American ophthalmologist and scientific author
- Alan Scott (blacksmith) (1936–2009), Australian maker of brick ovens and author of baking manual
- Allen J. Scott (born 1938), English writer and professor of geography and public policy
- Allan Scott (Scottish screenwriter) (born 1939), Scottish screenwriter and producer of Regeneration and The Queen's Gambit

=== Other people ===
- Allen D. Scott (1831–1897), American lawyer and politician from New York
- Allan Scott (businessman) (1923–2008), Australian truck magnate
- Alan James Scott (born 1934), British governor of the Cayman Islands, 1987–1992

== Fictional characters ==
- Alan Scott, alter ego of DC Comics superhero Green Lantern

== See also ==
- Al Scott (disambiguation)
- Scott Allen (disambiguation)
- Scott Allan, Scottish footballer
