= 1975 NCAA Division II lacrosse tournament =

1975 NCAA Division II Men's Lacrosse Championship
Tournament information
- Sport: College lacrosse
- Location: United States
- Venue(s): C.W. Post Stadium; Brookville, NY
- Participants: 8

Final positions
- Champions: Cortland (1st)
- Runner-up: Hobart

Tournament statistics
- Matches played: 7
- Goals scored: 163 (23.29 per match)
- Top scorer(s): Bob Griebe, Towson State (15)

The 1975 NCAA Division II Lacrosse Championship was the second annual single-elimination tournament to determine the national champions of NCAA Division II men's college lacrosse in the United States. That year's championship game was played at C.W. Post Stadium at the C.W. Post Campus of Long Island University in Brookville, New York.

Cortland defeated Hobart in the final, 12−11, to win their first national title. The Red Dragons (10–4) were coached by Chuck Winters.

== Qualification ==
All Division II men's lacrosse programs were eligible for this championship with a total of eight teams invited.

Team	Appearance	Previous
Cortland	2nd	1974
Hobart	2nd	1974
Morgan State	1st	–
Ohio Wesleyan	1st	–
Salisbury State	1st	–
Towson State	2nd	1974
UMBC	2nd	1974
Washington College	2nd	1974

== Bracket ==
Quarterfinals
Hobart	18
Ohio Wesleyan	8
Towson State	17
Salisbury State	7
Washington College	17
Morgan State	8
Cortland	9**
UMBC	8

Semifinals
Hobart	17
Towson State	9
Washington College	6
Cortland	16

Championship; Brookville, NY
Hobart	11
Cortland	12

== See also ==
- 1975 NCAA Division I lacrosse tournament
