= Big Ten women's lacrosse tournament =

Big Ten Conference women's lacrosse tournament
- Tournament Logo
- Sport: College lacrosse
- Conference: Big Ten Conference
- Number of teams: 9
- Format: Single-elimination tournament
- Current stadium: Lanny and Sharon Martin Stadium
- Current location: Evanston, Illinois
- Played: 2015–present
- Last contest: 2025
- Current champion: Northwestern Wildcats
- Most championships: Northwestern Wildcats (5)
- TV partner: Big Ten Network
- Official website: Big Ten

The Big Ten women's lacrosse tournament began in 2015, with the winner of the tournament receiving the conference's automatic bid into the NCAA Women's Lacrosse Championship.

The first two years of the tournament (2015–2016) all six teams participated in the event. The Big Ten's addition of Johns Hopkins for the 2016–2017 academic year brought the total number of teams in the conference to seven. However, starting with the 2017 event, the conference invited the top four teams from the regular season to the conference tournament matching the same format as the men.

== Tournament champions ==
Year	Champion	Runner-up	Score	Location
2015	Penn State	Ohio State	13–11	High Point Solutions Stadium, Piscataway, New Jersey
2016	Maryland	Northwestern	12–9	Lanny and Sharon Martin Stadium, Evanston, Illinois
2017	Maryland	Northwestern	14–6	Field Hockey & Lacrosse Complex, College Park, Maryland
2018	Maryland	Penn State	21-12	Michigan Stadium, Ann Arbor, Michigan
2019	Northwestern	Maryland	16–11	Homewood Field, Baltimore, Maryland
2020	Cancelled due to the COVID-19 pandemic			
2021	Northwestern	Maryland	17–12	Panzer Stadium, State College, Pennsylvania
2022	Maryland	Rutgers	18-8	SHI Stadium, Piscataway, New Jersey
2023	Northwestern	Maryland	14-9	Ohio State Lacrosse Stadium, Columbus, Ohio
2024	Northwestern	Penn State	14-12	Lanny and Sharon Martin Stadium, Evanston, Illinois
2025	Northwestern	Maryland	8-7	Field Hockey & Lacrosse Complex, College Park, Maryland

== Tournament history by school ==
School	Championships	Runners-up	Tournament appearances	Last appearance
Johns Hopkins	0	0	5	2024
Maryland	4	3	8	2024
Michigan	0	0	6	2024
Northwestern	5	2	10	2025
Ohio State	0	1	5	2024
Penn State	1	2	8	2024
Rutgers	0	1	4	2024
