= Robert H. Scott =

Robert H. Scott may refer to:

- Robert H. Scott III, American economist
- Robert Heatlie Scott (1905–1982), British civil servant
- Robert H. Scott (lacrosse coach) (c. 1930–2016), Johns Hopkins lacrosse coach
- Robert Henry Scott (1833–1916), Irish meteorologist
