= What Is Dungeons & Dragons? =

Cover of Penguin 1st edition, 1982

What Is Dungeons & Dragons? is a book by John Butterfield, Philip Parker and David Honigmann published by Penguin Books (UK) in 1982 that gives a detailed explanation of how to play the fantasy role-playing game Dungeons & Dragons.

== Description ==
What Is Dungeons & Dragons? is a book that explains what Dungeons & Dragons is to people who have never played a role-playing game, and provides step-by-step instructions on how to play. The book is divided into nine chapters:

1. Basic overview of a role-playing game.
2. How characters are created, in-game currency, languages, polyhedral dice, character alignment, equipment and encumbrance, and the basic settings of most adventures ("lairs, often hidden deep below ground, in labyrinthine complexes full of twisting corridors, secret passages, and nearly always, traps.")
3. How to design a dungeon. The authors build an ancient underground temple called "Kollchap" from scratch.
4. A walkthrough of the adventure Shrine of Kollchap, using the dungeon built in the previous chapter. This includes dialogue representing the interaction between players and the gamemaster, as well as gloss explaining which rules are being used at various points.
5. How to be a Dungeon Master.
6. Possible accessories, including metal miniatures, pre-generated adventures, and games magazines of the early 1980s.
7. Role-playing using computers of the time.
8. An overview of the various extensions to the rules of D&D such as Advanced Dungeons & Dragons and the BECMI (Basic, Expert, Companion, Master, Immortal) rulebooks.
9. Other role-playing games available in the early 1980s.

The book concludes with a list of publishers and model manufacturers, a bibliography, a glossary, and an index.

== Publication history ==
John Butterfield, Philip Parker and David Honigmann began to play D&D while they were attending Eton College. They decided to write a book explaining the game to new players, and the result was What Is Dungeons & Dragons?, a 230-page book published in the UK by Penguin Books in 1982, and in the United States by Warner Books in 1984.

Following this, the three authors co-wrote a trilogy of single-player "choose your own adventure" fantasy game books called the Cretan Chronicles, published by Puffin Books in 1985–1986.

== Reception ==
Dave Pringle reviewed What Is Dungeons & Dragons? for Imagine magazine, and stated that "The latter contains some amusing juxtapositions; apparently game-players will find inspiration in the writings of J. G. Ballard, Beowulf and Alfred Bester; or Stanton A. Coblentz, Dante and Samuel R. Delany; or Homer, Ted Hughes and John Jakes; or even Jonathan Swift, A. E. van Vogt and Virgil. The mind boggles .... gamers are nothing if not eclectic!"
