= Bert Scott (disambiguation) =

Bert Scott is a footballer.

Bert Scott may also refer to:

- Bert Scott, businessman, co-founder of Hall-Scott

== See also ==
- Robert Scott (disambiguation)
- Albert Scott (disambiguation)
- Hubert Scott, British aircraft and boat designer
- Herbert Scott (disambiguation)
