= Robert William Scott =

Robert William Scott may refer to:

- Bobby Scott (musician), American musician, record producer, and songwriter
- Bobby Scott (Australian footballer), Australian rules footballer
- Bob Scott (Queensland politician)
