= Towson Tigers men's lacrosse =

Towson University NCAA Division I college lacrosse

- Founded: 1958
- University: Towson University
- Head coach: Shawn Nadelen (since 2012 season)
- Stadium: Johnny Unitas Stadium (capacity: 11,198)
- Location: Towson, Maryland
- Conference: Coastal Athletic Association
- Nickname: Tigers
- Colors: Black and gold

NCAA Tournament championships
- (1) - 1974*

NCAA Tournament Runner-Up
- (1) - 1991

NCAA Tournament Final Fours
- (6) - 1974*, 1975*, 1979*, 1991, 2001, 2017

NCAA Tournament Quarterfinals
- (12) - 1974*, 1975*, 1976*, 1978*, 1979*, 1991, 1992, 1996, 2001, 2003, 2016, 2017

NCAA Tournament appearances
- (23) - 1974*, 1975*, 1976*, 1977*, 1978*, 1979*, 1989, 1991, 1992, 1994, 1996, 2001, 2003, 2004, 2005, 2007, 2013, 2015, 2016, 2017, 2019, 2024, 2025

Conference Tournament championships
- (11) - 2001, 2003, 2004, 2005, 2013, 2015, 2016, 2017, 2019, 2024, 2025

Conference regular season championships
- (16) - 1983, 1985, 1987, 1990, 1991, 2001, 2003, 2004, 2005, 2007, 2010, 2016, 2017, 2019, 2024, 2025, 2026 * NCAA Division II

The Towson Tigers men's lacrosse team represents Towson University in National Collegiate Athletic Association (NCAA) Division I college lacrosse. The coach is currently Shawn Nadelen. The team plays its home games in Johnny Unitas Stadium. Towson has competed in the Colonial Athletic Association for lacrosse since 2002, with the conference tournament format commencing in 2003. Previously being a member of the East Coast Conference and the America East Conference. The team's principal rivals are the Loyola Greyhounds, though the team has other significant series with Maryland and Johns Hopkins.

== History ==
The program first started at the varsity level in 1958. Since then, the team has a cumulative record of 433–326, combined DI and DII. Towson has made 21 NCAA Tournament appearances.

Towson won the NCAA Division II Men's Lacrosse Championship in 1974 defeating Hobart 18–17 in overtime, in the very first Division II championship tournament. Overall, the Tigers have made 14 NCAA tournaments.

In the 1991 NCAA tournament, under coach Carl Runk, Towson recorded their first NCAA Division I tournament victory, defeating Virginia, 14–13. That season, they went on to also defeat Princeton and Maryland, before falling to North Carolina in the championship game, 18–13. In the 2001 edition of the tournament, Towson reached the Final Four, defeating Duke and Maryland, before losing to Princeton, 11–12.

In the 2013 NCAA Division I Men's Lacrosse Championship, Towson upset NCAA tournament seed Penn State to gain the Colonial conference title, losing in the first round 16–6 to #3 seed Ohio State. Also the Tigers won 10–8 in the play-in game, followed by a close 12–10 loss to eventual finalist Notre Dame in 2015.

In the 2019 season, Towson reached the #1 ranking in all three major NCAA Lacrosse polls for the first time in the school's history as a Division I school.

== Notable players and coaches ==
- Casey Cittadino
- Dick Edell
- Kyle Fiat
- Spencer Ford
- Shawn Nadelen
- Carl Runk
- Rob Shek

== Season results ==
The following is a list of Towson's results by season since the institution of NCAA Division play in 1971:

Season	Coach	Overall	Conference	Standing	Postseason
Carl Runk (Independent) (1968–1982)
1971	Carl Runk	13–1			
1972	Carl Runk	12–6			USILA College Division Semifinals
1973	Carl Runk	11–4			USILA College Division Semifinals
1974	Carl Runk	14–1			NCAA Division II Champion
1975	Carl Runk	6–11			NCAA Division II Final Four
1976	Carl Runk	8–6			NCAA Division II Quarterfinals
1977	Carl Runk	8–8			NCAA Division II First Round
1978	Carl Runk	8–7			NCAA Division II Quarterfinals
1979	Carl Runk	10–6			NCAA Division II Final Four
1980	Carl Runk	5–6			
1981	Carl Runk	7–7			
1982	Carl Runk	4–9			
Carl Runk (East Coast Conference) (1983–1992)
1983	Carl Runk	10–4	6–0	1st	
1984	Carl Runk	8–5	5–1		
1985	Carl Runk	8–5	5–1	T–1st	
1986	Carl Runk	8–6	5–1		
1987	Carl Runk	10–3	6–0	1st	
1988	Carl Runk	8–5	5–1		
1989	Carl Runk	9–5	4–2		NCAA Division I First Round
1990	Carl Runk	11–2	6–0	1st	
1991	Carl Runk	12–4	4–0	1st	NCAA Division I Runner–Up
1992	Carl Runk	9–3	1–1		NCAA Division I Quarterfinals
Carl Runk (Independent) (1993–1995)
1993	Carl Runk	6–5			
1994	Carl Runk	7–5			NCAA Division I First Round
1995	Carl Runk	6–5			
Carl Runk (America East Conference) (1996–1998)
1996	Carl Runk	9–5	5–1		NCAA Division I Quarterfinals
1997	Carl Runk	5–7	4–2		
1998	Carl Runk	5–7	3–2		
Carl Runk:		262–161 (.619)	59–12 (.831)		
Tony Seaman (America East Conference) (1999–2001)
1999	Tony Seaman	5–8	3–2		
2000	Tony Seaman	3–10	2–3		
2001	Tony Seaman	14–4	5–0	1st	NCAA Division I Final Four
Tony Seaman (Colonial Athletic Association) (2002–2011)
2002	Tony Seaman	7–5	4–2	3rd	
2003	Tony Seaman	9–6	5–0	1st	NCAA Division I Quarterfinals
2004	Tony Seaman	11–5	5–0	1st	NCAA Division I First Round
2005	Tony Seaman	11–5	4–1	T–1st	NCAA Division I First Round
2006	Tony Seaman	8–6	5–1	2nd	
2007	Tony Seaman	9–7	5–1	T–1st	NCAA Division I First Round
2008	Tony Seaman	5–9	3–3	T–3rd	
2009	Tony Seaman	7–10	4–2	2nd	
2010	Tony Seaman	7–8	4–1	1st	
2011	Tony Seaman	3–10	1–5	6th	
Tony Seaman:		99–93 (.516)	50–21 (.704)		
Shawn Nadelen (Colonial Athletic Association) (2012–Present)
2012	Shawn Nadelen	7–8	2–4	T–3rd	
2013	Shawn Nadelen	10–8	4–2	3rd	NCAA Division I First Round
2014	Shawn Nadelen	8–7	2–3	4th	
2015	Shawn Nadelen	12–6	3–2	T–2nd	NCAA Division I First Round
2016	Shawn Nadelen	16–3	4–1	T–1st	NCAA Division I Quarterfinals
2017	Shawn Nadelen	12–5	4–1	1st	NCAA Division I Final Four
2018	Shawn Nadelen	7–8	3–2	T–2nd	
2019	Shawn Nadelen	11–5	4–1	T–1st	NCAA Division I First Round
2020	Shawn Nadelen	0–6	0–0	†	†
2021	Shawn Nadelen	6–8	3–5	5th	
2022	Shawn Nadelen	7–9	3–2	3rd	
2023	Shawn Nadelen	6–9	5–2	4th	
2024	Shawn Nadelen	13–4	7–0	1st	NCAA Division I First Round
2025	Shawn Nadelen	11–6	7–0	1st	NCAA Division I First Round
2026	Shawn Nadelen	11–4	6–0	1st	
Shawn Nadelen:		134–96 (.583)	55–25 (.688)		
Total:		531–393 (.575)			
National champion Postseason invitational champion Conference regular season champion Conference regular season and conference tournament champion Division regular season champion Division regular season and conference tournament champion Conference tournament champion

†NCAA canceled 2020 collegiate activities due to the COVID-19 virus.
