= Carl Runk =

American football player and coach (1935 or 1936 – 2024)

Biographical details
- Born: 1935 or 1936
- Died: November 24, 2024 (aged 88)

Playing career

Football
- 1961–1962: Arizona

Coaching career (HC unless noted)

Football
- 1969–1971: Towson State

Lacrosse
- 1968–1998: Towson State / Towson

Head coaching record
- Overall: 11–14–1 (football); 262–161 (lacrosse)

Accomplishments and honors

Awards
- Lacrosse; NCAA Division II (1974)

Carl Runk (1935 or 1936 – November 24, 2024) was an American college lacrosse and college football coach at Towson University in Towson, Maryland, with over 30 years of combined coaching experience. He was the Tigers' first-ever head football coach, which he coached from 1969 to 1971. Runk is however, best known for his coaching success with Towson men's lacrosse program, where he was head coach from 1968 to 1998.

== Early life ==
Runk graduated from the University of Arizona where he played on the Arizona Wildcats football team. He then began coaching the men's lacrosse team at Arizona throughout the 1960s. After bringing the Arizona program to consistent success, Runk went to Towson University (then Towson State) in 1968.

== Lacrosse ==
=== Towson University ===
Runk coached Towson men's lacrosse for 31 years. He compiled an overall record of 261–161–0. In 1974, he led the Tigers to the National Championship by defeating Hobart 18–17, making them the College Division National Lacrosse Champions. Towson moved to Division I in 1980 and had continued success with five conference titles in the East Coast Conference. In 1989 they reached their first NCAA Division I Tournament bid. During 1990's Runk led his team to four tournament bids along with an appearance in the national championship in 1991. Throughout his time at Towson, Runk coached a "Player of the Year" in every position, as well as 67 All-Americans.

=== Hereford High School ===
After leaving Towson, Runk took over coaching the boys' lacrosse team at Hereford High School in Baltimore County, near his home. In his time at Hereford, the school won the Maryland State Championship in 2003 and 2008 as well as county and division championships in 2008. They qualified for the regional tournament in every year he coached at the school.

== Later life and death ==
Runk retired from formal coaching after the championship season with Hereford in 2008. Runk, however, still stayed involved with the game as he helped develop programs in Naples, Florida, as well as an annual recruiting camp named Top Star that he hosted for prospective college lacrosse athletes. It is held at Gettysburg College in Pennsylvania.

Runk wrote a book in 2008 entitled "Carl Runk's Coaching Lacrosse: Strategies, Drills & Plays from an NCAA Tournament Winning Coach's Playbook".

Runk lived with his wife in Parkton, Maryland, and taught kinesiology courses at Towson University. He died on November 24, 2024, at the age of 88.

== Head coaching record ==
=== Football ===
Year	Team	Overall	Conference	Standing	Bowl/playoffs
Towson State Tigers (Mason–Dixon Conference) (1969–1971)
1969	Towson State	4–4–1	1–2	5th	
1970	Towson State	6–2	2–1	3rd	
1971	Towson State	1–8	0–3	7th	
Towson State:		11–14–1	3–6		
Total:		11–14–1			

== See also ==
- List of college men's lacrosse coaches with 250 wins
