= Alex Scott =

Alex Scott may refer to:

== Sportspeople ==
=== Association football ===
- Alex Scott (footballer, born 1913) (1913–1962), English football goalkeeper who played for Wolverhampton Wanderers and Crewe Alexandra
- Alex Scott (footballer, born 1936) (1936–2001), Scottish football winger who played for Rangers and Everton
- Alex Scott (footballer, born 1984), English women's international footballer, and television pundit, who played for Arsenal
- Alex Scott (footballer, born 2003), English football midfielder who plays for Bournemouth

=== Other sports ===
- Alex Scott (racehorse trainer) (1960–1994), British racehorse trainer murdered in 1994
- Alex Scott (cricketer) (born 1990), Hong Kong cricketer

== Other people ==
- Alex Scott (actor) (1929–2015), Australian-British actor who starred in shows such as The Saint and Randall & Hopkirk
- Alex Scott (1996–2004), founder of Alex's Lemonade Stand Foundation, a nationwide U.S. charity to raise funds for pediatric cancer research
- Alex Scott (politician) (born 1940), Bermudian politician who served as Premier, 2003–2006

== See also ==
- Alexander Scott (disambiguation)
- Alec Scott (1906–1978), British horse rider
- Aleck Scott, a steamer renamed USS Lafayette
