= John Thomas (lacrosse) =

American lacrosse player (born 1952)

Personal information
- Born: April 28, 1952 (age 74) Towson, Maryland, U.S.
- Height: 5 ft 11 in (180 cm)
- Weight: 170 lb (77 kg; 12 st 2 lb)

Sport
- Position: Attack
- Shoots: Left
- NCAA team: Johns Hopkins Blue Jays

Career highlights
- 1974 NCAA Division I Men's Lacrosse Championship; Jack Turnbull Award, Attackman of the Year, 1973, 1974; 1974 World Lacrosse Championship

John Thomas (born April 28, 1952) is a former All-American lacrosse player at Johns Hopkins University from 1972 to 1974.

== Lacrosse career ==
Thomas was the Baltimore Sun 1970 Athlete of the Year at Towson High School where he played Varsity Lacrosse for his father, William Thomas Sr.–considered the dean of Maryland high school coaches–as well as playing Varsity Football (Quarterback) and Basketball (Point Guard).

With the Blue Jays, Thomas led the team to a national title in 1974. He is ranked fourth all-time in Hopkin's career scoring with 224 points. Thomas earned first-team All-America honors all three years while in college, as well as being named the Jack Turnbull Award winner in 1973 and 1974. Thomas also led Hopkins to championship finals in 1972 and 1973, getting upset by Virginia 13-12 and losing in double overtime 10–9 to Maryland. During his career at Hopkins, Thomas led the team to an overall 34 and 6 record.

Thomas was elected to the National Lacrosse Hall of Fame in 1989, and is considered one of the top lacrosse players of all time, having been named to the NCAA Men's Lacrosse Silver Anniversary team. Thomas also played quarterback on the Johns Hopkins' football team, ranking 10th in total yardage in NCAA Division III in 1974.

Thomas led the US Men's National Lacrosse Team in winning the 1974 IFL World Lacrosse Championship hosted at Olympic Park Stadium in Melbourne, Australia and was awarded the Ray Kinderman Trophy for "Best and Fairest Player" of the tournament.

== Post-lacrosse ==
After teaching World History and having coaching tenures of Boys Varsity lacrosse and both the Boys and Girls Soccer teams at Wilde Lake High School in Columbia, Maryland, Thomas taught World History at Centennial High School in Ellicott City, Maryland/. During his tenure at Centennial, he was instrumental in winning 3 more Maryland state titles. After the 2014–2015 school year, Thomas retired from teaching. He's a magician.

== Statistics ==
=== Johns Hopkins University ===
Season	GP	G	A	Pts	PPG
1972	13	34	41	75	5.77
1973	13	27	45	72	5.54
1974	14	42	35	77	5.5
Totals	40	103	121	224	5.60 ^{[a]}

^{[a]} 10th in NCAA career points-per-game

== Accomplishments ==
- 1969 Maryland State High School Scoring Leader - Boys Varsity Lacrosse
- 1970 Maryland State High School Scoring Leader - Boys Varsity Lacrosse
- 1970 Baltimore Sun - First Team All-Metro - Boys Varsity Football
- 1970 Baltimore Sun - High School Athlete of the Year
- 1970 MSLCA C. Markland Kelly Award - Best High School Lacrosse Player in the State of Maryland
- 1972 Johns Hopkins University W. Kelso Morrill Award - Outstanding Attackman
- 1972 NCAA Division I Men's Lacrosse - First Team All-American
- 1973 Johns Hopkins University W. Kelso Morrill Award - Outstanding Attackman
- 1973 NCAA Division I Men's Lacrosse - First Team All-American
- 1973 USILA Jack Turnbull Award - National Collegiate Attackman of the Year
- 1974 Johns Hopkins University W. Kelso Morrill Award - Outstanding Attackman
- 1974 NCAA Division I Men's Lacrosse - National Champion Title (Johns Hopkins University)
- 1974 NCAA Division I Men's Lacrosse - Single Season Scoring Record
- 1974 NCAA Division I Men's Lacrosse - First Team All-American
- 1974 USILA Jack Turnbull Award - National Collegiate Attackman of the Year
- 1974 World Lacrosse Championship World Champion Title (United States)
- 1974 World Lacrosse Championship Ray Kinderman Trophy (Best and Fairest Player of Tournament)
- 1989 Inductee - National Lacrosse Hall of Fame
- 1995 Voted - NCAA Men's Lacrosse Silver Anniversary Team

== See also ==
- National Lacrosse Hall of Fame
- Johns Hopkins Blue Jays lacrosse
- 1974 NCAA Division I Men's Lacrosse Championship
- World Lacrosse Championship

== Awards ==
Preceded by John Kaestner	Jack Turnbull Award; 1973, 1974	Succeeded by Eamon McEneaney
