= Johns Hopkins Blue Jays =

Intercollegiate athletics teams of Johns Hopkins University

- University: Johns Hopkins University
- Nickname: Blue Jays
- Association: Division III; Division I (lacrosse)
- Conference: Centennial Conference (primary); Big Ten Conference (lacrosse); MPSF (men's water polo)
- Athletic director: Jennifer S. Baker
- Location: Baltimore, Maryland
- Varsity teams: 24
- Football stadium: Homewood Field
- Basketball arena: Newton White Athletic Center; Goldfarb Gymnasium
- Colors: Hopkins blue and black
- Mascot: Jay
- Fight song: To Win; Johnny Hopkins, On to Victory
- Website: hopkinssports.com
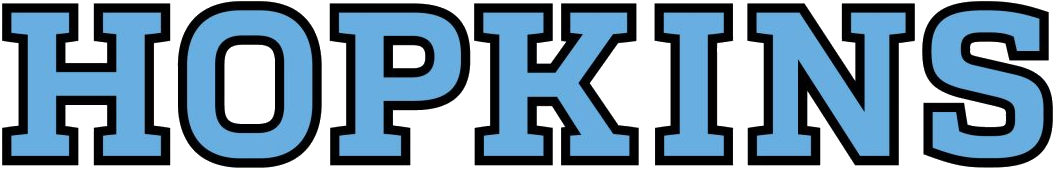

The Johns Hopkins Blue Jays are the 24 intercollegiate athletic teams that represent Johns Hopkins University, located in Baltimore, Maryland. They compete in NCAA Division III, except for their lacrosse teams, which compete in Division I. Men's water polo is a de facto Division I sport, with the NCAA organizing a single championship open to members of all divisions. They are primarily members of the Centennial Conference, while the men's and women's lacrosse teams compete in the Big Ten Conference and the men's water polo team competes in the Mountain Pacific Sports Federation. The team colors are Hopkins blue (PMS 284) and black, and the blue jay is their mascot. Homewood Field is the home stadium.

Hopkins celebrates Homecoming in the spring to coincide with the height of the lacrosse season. The Lacrosse Museum and National Hall of Fame, governed by US Lacrosse, was located on the Homewood campus, adjacent to Homewood Field, until 2016 when it moved to its new facilities in Sparks, Maryland. Past Johns Hopkins lacrosse teams have represented the United States in international competition. At the 1932 Summer Olympics lacrosse demonstration event Hopkins played for the U.S. They have also gone to Melbourne, Australia to win the 1974 World Lacrosse Championship.

== Origin of the name ==
Originally, the Johns Hopkins athletes were not called Blue Jays but the Black and Blue, a nickname derived from their athletic colors. Hopkins archivist James Stimpert has theorized that the Blue Jay name stemmed from Hopkins' student humor magazine, The Black and Blue Jay, first published in 1920. The "Black and Blue" came from the athletic colors and the "Jay" most likely stood for first initial in Johns Hopkins.

== Varsity sports ==
Men's sports	Women's sports
Baseball	Basketball
Basketball	Cross country
Cross country	Fencing
Fencing	Field hockey
Football	Lacrosse
Lacrosse	Soccer
Soccer	Swimming
Swimming	Tennis
Tennis	Track and field
Track and field	Volleyball
Water polo	
Wrestling	

=== Men's basketball ===
During the 2021–22 season, the Blue Jays' basketball team, spearheaded by head coach Josh Loeffler, recorded a 23–4 record, ranked first in the Centennial Conference or region.

=== Fencing ===
Hopkins has an acclaimed fencing team, which ranked in the top three Division III teams in the past few years and in both 2008 and 2007 defeated the University of North Carolina, a Division I team. In 2008, they defeated UNC and won the MACFA championship.

=== Field hockey ===
The women's field hockey team has reached the NCAA semifinals six times in the last eight years (2018, 2019, 2021, 2022, 2023, and 2025); (the 2020 season was cancelled due to the COVID-19 pandemic) and has been the NCAA Division III National Championship runner-up the last 4 out of 5 years (2021, 2022, 2023, and 2025) losing to Middlebury College three times and Tufts University most recently in 2025.

=== Football ===
Hopkins' first team was assembled in 1881, and spent an entire year training and learning a version of the game. Their sport, which was closer to rugby, was played in Druid Hill Park. After the training, the team planned a two-game 1882 season. The squad had to play the season under the title of the Clifton Athletic Club, due to the school's policy on the sport of football. The first was a practice game with the Baltimore Athletic Club, played on October 7. The Hopkins team lost the contest 4–0. The following game was their first true game, to be played against the Naval Academy.

=== Men's lacrosse ===
The team was founded in 1883 and is the school's most prominent sports team. The Blue Jays have won forty-four national championships including nine NCAA Division I titles (2007, 2005, 1987, 1985, 1984, 1980, 1979, 1978, 1974), twenty-nine USILL/USILA titles, and six ILA titles, first all time by any college lacrosse team and second to Syracuse in NCAA era national titles.

Hopkins's primary lacrosse rivals are Princeton University, Syracuse University, and the University of Virginia; its primary intrastate rivals are Loyola University Maryland, competing in what is called the "Charles Street Massacre", Towson University, the United States Naval Academy, and the University of Maryland. The rivalry with Maryland is the oldest. The schools have met 111 times since 1899, including three times in playoff matches.

On June 3, 2013, it was announced that the Blue Jays would join the Big Ten Conference for men's lacrosse when that league begins sponsoring the sport in the 2015 season (2014–15 school year).

=== Women's lacrosse ===
The women's team is a member of the Big Ten Conference and a former member of the American Lacrosse Conference (ALC). The Lady Blue Jays were ranked number 18 in the 2015 Inside Lacrosse Women's DI Media Poll. They ranked number 8 in the 2007 Intercollegiate Women's Lacrosse Coaches Association (IWLCA) Poll Division I. The team finished the 2012 season with a 9–9 record and finished the 2013 season with a 10–7 record. They finished the 2014 season 15–5. On June 17, 2015, it was announced that the Blue Jays would join the Big Ten Conference for women's lacrosse in the 2017 season (2016–17 school year).

From the team's inception in 1976 through the 1998 season, the Blue Jays women competed at the NCAA Division III level. They switched to Division I starting in the 1999 season. The Blue Jays were members of the American Lacrosse Conference until its dissolution in 2014, competed as an independent during the 2015 and 2016 seasons, and officially joined the Big Ten on July 1, 2016, making the 2017 season the first season of Big Ten Conference play for the Blue Jays. The Blue Jays became the seventh women's lacrosse program in the conference.

=== Women's soccer ===
In 2022, the women's soccer team won their first NCAA Division III Women's Soccer National Championship with a season record of 23-0-2. The 23 wins are the most in program history. The coaching staff were named the Region V coaching staff of the year.

=== Swimming ===
JHU Men's Swimming won three consecutive NCAA Championships in 1977, 1978, and 1979. In 2009–2010, Hopkins won 8 Centennial Conference titles in Women's Cross Country, Women's Track & Field, Baseball, Men's and Women's Soccer, Football, and Men's and Women's Tennis. The Women's Cross Country team became the first women's team at Hopkins to achieve a #1 National ranking. In 2006–2007 teams won Centennial Conference titles in Baseball, Men's and Women's Soccer, Men's and Women's Tennis and Men's Basketball. Women's soccer won their Centennial Conference title for 7 consecutive years from 2005 to 2011. In the 2013–2014 school year, Hopkins earned 12 Centennial Conference titles, most notably from the cross country and track & field teams, which accounted for six.

The men's swimming team has ranked highly in NCAA Division III for the last 20 years, most recently placing second at DIII Nationals in 2008 and 2022. The water polo team was number one in Division III for several of the past years, playing a full schedule against Division I opponents. Hopkins also has a century-old rivalry with McDaniel College, formerly Western Maryland College, playing the Green Terrors 83 times in football since the first game in 1894. In 2009, the football team reached the quarterfinals of the NCAA Division III tournament, with three tournament appearances since 2005. In 2008, the baseball team ranked second, losing in the final game of the DIII College World Series to Trinity College.

== Club teams ==
The Johns Hopkins squash team plays in the College Squash Association as a club team along with Division I and III varsity programs. In 2011–12 the squash team finished 30th in the ranking.

== Championships ==
The school's most prominent sports team is its men's lacrosse team, which has won 44 national titles — nine NCAA Division I (2007, 2005, 1987, 1985, 1984, 1980, 1979, 1978, 1974), 29 United States Intercollegiate Lacrosse Association (USILA), and six Intercollegiate Lacrosse Association (ILA) titles. Hopkins' lacrosse rivals include Princeton University, Syracuse University, the University of Virginia, and a budding rivalry with Duke University due to intense recent competition, including one-goal victories over the Blue Devils in both the 2005 and 2007 NCAA Championships and in the NCAA semifinals in the 2008; its primary intrastate rivals are Loyola University Maryland, Towson University, the United States Naval Academy, and the University of Maryland. The rivalry with Maryland is the most prominent in college lacrosse and the two teams have met 105 times. On June 3, 2013, it was announced that Johns Hopkins would be joining the Big Ten Conference as a Sport Affiliate member in Men's Lacrosse starting in 2015.

The Blue Jays men's soccer team has won eight Centennial Conference Regular Season titles along with another four ECAC titles previously to joining the Centennial Conference in 1993. The team has reached the NCAA tournament 12 times in the program's history. The team is currently on a streak of 16 winning seasons and has had over 20 All-American selections.

The women's soccer team has won 15 Centennial Conference championships since 1996, and won its first NCAA Division III Women's Soccer Championship in 2022.

Hopkins also has an acclaimed fencing team, which has ranked in the top three of Division III teams in the past few years and in 2007 defeated the University of North Carolina, a Division I team, for the first time. The Swimming team also has ranked in the top two of Division III for the last 10 years. Hopkins also has a century-old rivalry with McDaniel College (formerly Western Maryland College), playing the Green Terrors 83 times in football since the first game in 1894.

Johns Hopkins' latest team to encounter postseason success is the school's baseball team. Although Johns Hopkins baseball regularly wins the Centennial Conference regular season and tournament titles, 2008 was the first time since 1989 that the Blue Jays made it to the College World Series for Division III baseball, hosted in Appleton, Wisconsin. The Blue Jays finished runner-up to Trinity College, losing the championship game. In addition, Johns Hopkins Baseball made it to the D3 College World Series in 2010 (5th place finish) and 2019 (3rd place finish).

The Blue Jays were the first regular U.S. baseball team to play in the Soviet Union. In June 1988, they played three games in Moscow. They were also the first team to play with a Soviet baseball team on the American soil, on October 13, 1988, in Baltimore, Maryland, against the Mendeleev Moscow Institute of Chemistry and Technology varsity team.

The women's cross country team has experienced great success in recent years, finishing 7th at the NCAA championship in 2009 and 2010. The cross country and track & field teams have also had several All-American runners in the past few years. In 2012, the women's cross country team beat out top-ranked MIT to become the first women's program in Johns Hopkins history to win an NCAA championship. They also won the NCAA championship in 2013 and 2014, giving them 3 championships in just 8 appearances.

The Johns Hopkins women's volleyball team won their 1st Centennial Conference Title in 2011. The volleyball team has 4 NCAA All-Americans.

=== NCAA team championships ===
Johns Hopkins has won 22 NCAA national team championships:

Division I

- Men's Lacrosse (9): 1974, 1978, 1979, 1980, 1984, 1985, 1987, 2005, 2007

Division III

- Women's Cross Country (8): 2012, 2013, 2014, 2016, 2017, 2019, 2021, 2022
- Women's Soccer (1): 2022
- Men's Swimming (3): 1977, 1978, 1979
- Volleyball (1): 2019

=== Centennial Conference Team championships ===
- Baseball (20): 1994, 1997, 1998, 2001, 2002, 2003, 2004, 2007, 2008, 2009, 2010, 2011, 2015, 2017, 2019, 2021, 2023, 2024, 2025, 2026
- Basketball (M) (6): 1999, 2007, 2014, 2018, 2020, 2022
- Basketball (W) (4): 1996, 1999, 2000, 2003
- Cross Country (M) (3): 2013, 2019, 2022, 2023
- Cross Country (W) (14): 2008, 2009, 2010, 2011, 2012, 2013, 2014, 2015, 2016, 2017, 2018, 2019, 2021, 2022, 2023
- Field Hockey (8): 1993, 1999, 2000, 2003, 2018, 2019, 2021, 2022, 2023
- Football (15): 2002, 2003, 2004, 2005, 2009, 2010, 2011, 2012, 2013, 2014, 2015, 2016, 2017, 2018, 2021
- Lacrosse (W) (4): 1994, 1995, 1997, 1998
- Soccer (M) (9): 1996, 1998, 2000, 2002, 2004, 2006, 2007, 2009, 2019, 2023
- Soccer (W) (15): 1996, 1997, 2002, 2005, 2006, 2007, 2008, 2009, 2010, 2011, 2013, 2015, 2016, 2019, 2022, 2023
- Volleyball (9): 2011, 2012, 2013, 2016, 2017, 2018, 2019, 2021, 2022

== See also ==
- List of NCAA schools with the most NCAA Division I championships
- List of NCAA schools with the most Division I national championships
- Big Ten Conference NCAA national team championships

== Rivalries ==
- McDaniel College-Hopkins rivalry See: Maryland Railroad Lantern Game
- Johns Hopkins–Maryland lacrosse rivalry Lacrosse
- Johns Hopkins–Loyola lacrosse rivalry
- Johns Hopkins–Navy football rivalry
