= Herbert Scott =

Herbert Scott may refer to:

- Herbert Scott (American football) (born 1953), American football player
- Herbert Scott (equestrian) (1885–1966), British horse rider
- Herbert S. Scott (1931–2006), American poet
- Lord Herbert Scott (1872–1944), British Army officer
- Herbert Hedley Scott (1866–1938), Australian museum director and curator

== See also ==
- Bert Scott (disambiguation)
