= Centennial Conference baseball tournament =

Annual baseball tournament

- Conference baseball championship
- Sport: Baseball
- Conference: Centennial Conference
- Format: Double-elimination tournament check
- Played: 1994–present
- Current champion: Johns Hopkins (18th)
- Most championships: Johns Hopkins (18)
- Official website: Centennial baseball

The Centennial Conference baseball tournament is the annual conference baseball championship tournament for the NCAA Division III Centennial Conference. The tournament has been held annually since 1994. It is a double-elimination tournament and seeding is based on regular season records. The tournament champion receives the Centennial's automatic bid to the NCAA Division III Baseball Championship.

== Results ==
Year	Champions	Score	Runners-up	Website	Refs
1994	Johns Hopkins				
1995	Franklin & Marshall				
1996	Ursinus				
1997	Johns Hopkins				
1998	Johns Hopkins				
1999	Ursinus				
2000	Ursinus				
2001	Johns Hopkins				
2002	Johns Hopkins	3-1; 5-4 (10)	Muhlenberg	Final release	
2003	Johns Hopkins	9-2; 6-4	Muhlenberg	Final release	
2004	Johns Hopkins	18-15; 17-9	Franklin & Marshall	Final release	
2005	Franklin & Marshall	1-0; 1-9; 4-3	Johns Hopkins	Final release	
2006	Franklin & Marshall	10-0; 7-4	Harverford	Final release	
2007	Johns Hopkins	21-4; 16-4	Ursinus		
2008	Johns Hopkins	5-4	Harverford	Final release	
2009	Johns Hopkins		Incomplete (rain)	Final release	
2010	Johns Hopkins	13-6	Harverford	Final release	
2011	Johns Hopkins	10-6	Harverford	Championship; Final release	
2012	Haverford	9-1	Washington College	2012	
2013	Franklin & Marshall	16-1	Johns Hopkins	2013	
2014	Harverford	2-1 (12)	Gettysburg	2014	
2015	Johns Hopkins	20-1	Franklin & Marshall	2015	
2016	Harverford	7-4	Johns Hopkins	2016	
2017	Johns Hopkins	4-3	Ursinus	2017	
2018	Swarthmore	4-3 (11)	Johns Hopkins	2018	
2019	Johns Hopkins	11-1	Harverford	2019	
2020	Cancelled due to the COVID-19 pandemic			2020	
2021	Johns Hopkins		No tournament	2021	
2022	Swarthmore		Incomplete	2022	
2023	Johns Hopkins	6–11; 13-8	Dickinson	2023	
2024	Johns Hopkins	15–10	Dickinson	2024	
