= Kyle Fiat =

American lacrosse player

Personal information
- Nationality: American
- Born: March 14, 1983 (age 43) Salt Lake City, Utah, U.S.
- Height: 6 ft 2 in (188 cm)
- Weight: 175 lb (79 kg; 12 st 7 lb)

Sport
- Position: Midfield/Attack
- Shoots: Left
- NLL team: Philadelphia Wings
- MLL team: Washington Bayhawks
- NCAA team: Towson University
- Pro career: 2007–

Kyle Fiat (born March 14, 1983, in Salt Lake City, UT) is professional lacrosse player who plays for the Philadelphia Wings in the National Lacrosse League and the Washington Bayhawks in Major League Lacrosse. Outside of lacrosse, Fiat is a physical education teacher at Dulaney High School near Baltimore, Maryland . He extravagantly dominates plyometrics and spreads his knowledge of the activity with his many weight training students.

== Collegiate career ==
Fiat attended the Towson University where he played under Defensive Coach and fellow Philadelphia Wings player, Shawn Nadelen. Fiat started college at Utah State University where he played club lacrosse before transferring to Towson University for two years and making the team as a walk-on.

== Professional career ==
Fiat signed with the Wings as a free agent on November 14, 2006. His first NLL goal came in dramatic fashion, scoring the game-winner on March 24, 2007, with 40 seconds remaining in a Wings come from behind victory over the Chicago Shamrox.

He was drafted by the Washington Bayhawks in Round Two (12th overall) of the 2007 MLL Supplemental Draft.

Fiat was named to Team USA for the 2007 World Indoor Lacrosse Championships.

Fiat also teaches Physical Education at Dulaney High School in Timonium, MD.

== Statistics ==
=== NLL ===
		Regular Season						Playoffs
Season	Team	GP	G	A	Pts	LB	PIM	GP	G	A	Pts	LB	PIM
2007	Philadelphia	14	1	8	9	45	13	-	-	-	-	-	-
NLL totals		14	1	8	9	45	13	-	-	-	-	-	-

=== MLL ===
		Regular Season							Playoffs
Season	Team	GP	G	2ptG	A	Pts	LB	PIM	GP	G	2ptG	A	Pts	LB	PIM
2007	Washington	7	0	0	1	1	7	1	-	-	-	-	-	-	-
MLL Totals		7	0	0	1	1	7	1	-	-	-	-	-	-	-

PU#GB8SCGB81775185
