= Alfred Scott =

Alfred Scott may refer to:

- Alfred Scott (New Zealand cricketer) (1901–1984), New Zealand cricketer
- Alfred Scott (West Indian cricketer) (born 1934), West Indian cricketer
- Alfred Angas Scott (1875–1923), motorcycle designer, inventor and founder of the Scott Motorcycle Company
- Alfred Henry Scott (British politician) (1868–1939), British Liberal politician
- Alfred Henry Scott (Canadian politician) (1840–1872), bartender and politician in Manitoba

== See also ==
- Al Scott (disambiguation)
