= Maelstrom (role-playing game) =

1984 table-top role playing game

- Cover
- Designers: Alexander Scott
- Publishers: Puffin Books/Arion Games
- Publication: 1984
- Genres: Historical
- Systems: Custom
- ISBN: 978-0-14-031811-1

Maelstrom is a role-playing game by Alexander Scott, originally published in 1984 by Puffin Books as a single soft cover book. Maelstrom was published under Puffin's Adventure Gamebooks banner, along with the Fighting Fantasy series, The Cretan Chronicles trilogy, and the Starlight Adventures series. Maelstrom was written while Scott was a teenager in school. The game is set in a 16th to 17th century British setting – the Tudor Period – although the rules can be adapted to other locations or time periods. Firearms (readily available in Europe at this time) are conspicuously absent from the setting, mentioned only in passing in the initial rulebook.

The Maelstrom book includes two adventures. One is intended to teach new players the rule of the game, the other is for a referee and a group of players.

Maelstrom has been republished as a PDF in 2008 by Arion Games, under license from Puffin Books. Arion Games also published seven supplementary rulebooks and resources such as The Maelstrom Companion, the Beggars' Companion, and several modules and settings resources. These are all available for online purchase at RPGNow.com in PDF format (see external links, below). The Maelstrom Companion provides guidelines for the in-game purchase and use of period firearms, as well as new livings, rules for using alchemy in the game, and other developments. The book also provides rules for using the town of Bury St Edmunds in the year 1540 as a setting for Maelstrom campaigns.

Arion Games have also published adaptions of the Maelstrom rules for use in other settings. These include Maelstrom Classic Fantasy (2012), for use in a high fantasy quasi-medieval world; Maelstrom Domesday (2013), set in England after the Norman Conquest; Maelstrom Gothic (2017), set in Victorian England; and Maelstrom Rome (2019) set in the Roman Empire during the reign of the Emperor Claudius.

== Character Creation ==
The opening section of the rules details character creation. Rules are given for how to generate the characters' attributes, and how to determine the character's "livings" (professions).

== Wounds and healing ==
Characters can easily end up with wounds that last for months. They can suffer the permanent loss of digits, or limbs. Using the advanced rules, a character may collapse in combat from sheer exhaustion, especially if wearing heavy armour, or from particular types of mortal wounds. They could suffer cuts, bruises or a variety of serious injuries from various weapons.

In Maelstrom, wounds are recorded separately and heal in parallel. Damage is rated on a numerical scale, such as a knife doing 1–6 damage. When the sum of a character's wounds exceeds their Endurance, that character falls unconscious.

Characters heal at the rate of 1 point per week assuming bed rest (and 1 point per month otherwise); this rate is per wound. A character suffering a series of minor wounds will recover much more quickly than one receiving a single significant wound. Treatments from a Doctor, Herbalist, or a Barber-Surgeon may increase the rate of healing, depending on a dice roll and skill checks.

== Experience ==
Experience rolls use percentile dice and are made against a specific attribute when the character succeeds in an area relevant to that attribute. When a successful experience roll is made, the attribute increases by one point (indicating increased ability). As characters become more experienced, they have progressively more difficulty increasing attributes. As the author notes, it is less likely that an experienced character will learn a new trick, whereas someone who has no experience in a particular area may learn something each time they exercise a skill.

== Aging ==
Age is an important characteristic to a character in Maelstrom. All Maelstrom characters start at age 14. As part of building a character, the player chooses one or more livings. The character spends a number of years training in each living and is assumed to have fully completed all training at the start of the campaign.

Age impacts the maximum values that each attribute may have. An inexperienced character may have low initial values but great potential, while an older character with experience may find that their attributes are limited by their age maximum and continue to decline as they get older. A character starting with many livings will be older than characters with few and will never achieve the attribute scores a younger character could achieve. Older characters are also more susceptible to disease.

== Livings ==
Professions (called Livings) in Maelstrom are not like the rigid class systems seen in many other RPGs from the 1980s. A character may have one or more livings as long as the referee agrees. A player is expected to provide a plausible explanation for the character having studied so many areas, and having to spend a number of years training in each. In some cases a character may be expected to refrain from using skills previously acquired on entering a new living. One example noted in the rule book is that of a mercenary becoming a priest and being expected to eschew previous experience with weapons.

Following is a partial list showing a range of the Livings a character may choose from the core rulebook and the Maelstrom Companion. (Some livings are divided into sub-sets of a main category, denoted by parentheses.)

- Noble
- Professional (Clerk, Doctor, Architect, Scrivener, etc.)
- Priest / member of religious order / Pastor
- Craftsman (Armourer, Bladesmith, Tailor, Painter, Mason, Engraver, etc.)
- Trader (Butcher, Fishmonger, Vintner, Grocer, etc.)
- Mercenary
- Sailor
- Hunter
- Rogue (Beggar, Thief, Burglar, Assassin, Trickster, or no specialty)
- Mage
- Travelling player (Minstrel, Musician, Actor)
- Herbalist
- Barber-Surgeon
- Alchemist
- Servant
- Labourer

== Magic system ==
In the world of Maelstrom, Mages in 16th and 17th century Europe are seen as practitioners of ancient magical arts. They are not witches, although the authorities often regard as such. Mages must keep their identities hidden from the Church and secular authority, and need to have a respectable profession.

No list of spells is provided, a mage can attempt to cast any spell that is within the areas of magic understood by the character. Mages can specialise, which provides improved capability, or they may choose to study only certain areas and be unable to cast spells unrelated to their area of study.

When casting a spell, Mages contact the "Maelstrom" to warp reality. The more that reality would need to change in order to fulfil the spell, the more difficult the spell is to cast. Spells are graded by the referee on a scale of 1 to 5 with 5 being the most difficult. Inexperienced mages will typically be only able to cast spells of grade 1 or 2 and even the most experienced mages will have difficulty with a spell of grade 5. Failure to successfully cast a spell can be dangerous with the severity of the consequences growing with the grade of the spell.

With an optional rule in place, excessive use of magic, can cause instabilities in reality.

The Living of mage is rare as well as outlawed. In Maelstrom, a campaign success is possible without a single player or non-player character mage in the party. Several game sessions might take place between an appearance of a non-player character mage. The game rules allowed the option of playing the entire campaign without any supernatural element, if desired.

== Reception ==
A review by Graeme Davis in Imagine magazine described the game as "overall [...] an interesting and elegantly-designed game. Players of fantasy rpgs will find a host of immensely useful information on 'real' late-Medieval life and society which could be a great help in developing campaign backgrounds, especially for city adventures."

In a discussion of then-contemporary children's books in the Times Educational Supplement, Audrey Laski cited Maelstrom as an example of "role-play games" for children. Laski described the game as "a particularly strong and interesting example of the genre."

In a later overview of the game for Arcane magazine, Zy Nicholson praised Maelstrom. Nicholson stated "Despite Alexander Scott being a schoolboy when he wrote it, Maelstrom had a maturity and inventiveness that eschewed the traditional dungeon monster-bash." Nicholas also lauded the Maelstrom magic system, saying "the system held surprising potential and restored to magick its secretive and ambiguous nature without undermining the historical milieu." Nicholson also argued that Maelstrom had been unfairly ignored by the gaming community at the time of its original release, because it had been distributed through bookshops rather than specialist gaming stores.
