= Albert Scott (disambiguation) =

Albert Charles Scott (1872-1969) was a British Royal Navy officer during the First World War.

Albert Scott may also refer to:

- Albert Scott, husband of Marian Marsh
- Albert Scott (bodybuilder); see Papua New Guinea at the 2011 Pacific Games
- Albert Scott, candidate for Warrington North

== See also ==
- Bert Scott (disambiguation)
- Al Scott (disambiguation)
