= Al Scott =

Al Scott may refer to:

- Al Scott (politician), Georgia Commissioner of Labor from 1991–1992
- Al Scott (producer) for Zeitgeist

== See also ==
- Albert Scott (disambiguation)
- Alan Scott (disambiguation)
- Alfred Scott (disambiguation)
- Alexander Scott (disambiguation)
- Alvin Scott (born 1955), basketball player
