= Scott Alexander =

Scott Alexander may refer to:

- Scott Alexander (baseball) (born 1989), American baseball pitcher
- Scott Alexander (born 1963), of American screenwriting duo Scott Alexander and Larry Karaszewski
- Scott Alexander (Indiana politician) (fl. 1980s–2020s), member of the Indiana Senate
- Scott Alexander (Kentucky politician) (born 1970), member of the Kentucky House of Representatives
- Scott Alexander Siskind (born 1984), author of the Slate Star Codex and Astral Codex Ten, blogs under the pen name Scott Alexander

== See also ==
- Alexander Scott (disambiguation)
