= Alan Scott (footballer, born 1907) =

Australian rules footballer

Personal information
- Full name: Alan Keith Scott
- Born: 19 February 1907; East Melbourne, Victoria
- Died: 3 April 1973 (aged 66); Frankston Community Hospital, Frankston, Victoria
- Height: 177 cm (5 ft 10 in)
- Weight: 73 kg (161 lb)

Playing career^{1}
Years	Club	Games (Goals)
1924–1926	St Kilda	19 (0)
- ^{1} Playing statistics correct to the end of 1926.

Alan Keith Scott (19 February 1907 – 3 April 1973) was an Australian rules footballer who played for the St Kilda Football Club in the Victorian Football League (VFL).

== Family ==
The son of John Robert Scott (1881–1955), and Ellen Elizabeth Scott (1878–1924), née Ryan, Alan Keith Scott was born at East Melbourne, Victoria on 19 February 1907.

== Football ==
While playing for the St Kilda Second XVIII, he was selected at centre half-back in a combined VFL Second's team that played against Geelong's First XVIII, during the two-week suspension of the VFL season (due to the 1924 ANFC Carnival in Hobart), in Geelong on 9 August 1924.

== Military service ==
He served in the Second AIF.

== Death ==
He died at the Frankston Community Hospital, in Frankston, Victoria, on 3 April 1973.
