= Alexander Scott (British academic) =

British academic and mathematician

Alex Scott
- Born: Alexander David Scott

Academic background
- Education: Trinity College, Cambridge; University of Cambridge (PhD)

Academic work
- Discipline: Mathematics
- Institutions: Merton College, Oxford; University of Oxford

Alex Scott (born 1967) is a British mathematician, currently Professor of Mathematics at the University of Oxford and Fellow and Dominic Welsh Tutor in Mathematics at Merton College, Oxford.

== Early life ==
As a sixteen year old schoolboy, Scott wrote the role-playing game Maelstrom for Puffin Books. He took his first degree at Trinity College, Cambridge, gaining first class honours.

== Career ==
From 1993 to 1997, Scott was a Junior Research Fellow at Trinity College, Cambridge, where he graduated PhD in 1995. His dissertation, titled "Unavoidable Induced Subgraphs", was supervised by Béla Bollobás. From 1996 to 2001 he was lecturer in mathematics at University College, London, then Reader there from 2001 to 2005. In 1997 he was a Visiting Professor at the University of Memphis. In 2005 he was elected as a fellow and appointed as Dominic Welsh Tutor in Mathematics at Merton College, Oxford, then in 2006 became Professor of Mathematics in the University of Oxford.
