= 1974 NCAA Division I lacrosse tournament =

1974 NCAA Division I men's lacrosse tournament
- Dates: May 18–June 1, 1974
- Teams: 8
- Finals site: Rutgers Stadium, Piscataway, New Jersey
- Champions: Johns Hopkins (1st title)
- Runner-up: Maryland (3rd title game)
- Semifinalists: Cornell (2nd Final Four); Washington and Lee (2nd Final Four)
- Winning coach: Bob Scott (1st title)
- Attendance: 7,728 finals
- Top scorer: Franz Wittlesberger, Johns Hopkins (15 goals)

The 1974 NCAA Division I lacrosse tournament was the fourth annual tournament hosted by the National Collegiate Athletic Association to determine the team champion of college lacrosse among its Division I members in the United States.

Johns Hopkins, in the national championship game for the third straight year, defeated defending champion and top-ranked Maryland, 17–12, to win the title.

The championship game was played at Rutgers Stadium on the campus of Rutgers University in Piscataway, New Jersey and was played in front of a crowd of 7,728 fans.

== Overview ==
The championship game saw Johns Hopkins, 12-2 for the season and led by legendary coach Bob Scott and Hall of Fame attackman Jack Thomas, defeat University of Maryland, led by Hall of Famer Frank Urso.

This was the seventh Johns Hopkins team that Scott had directed to part or all of a national title dating back to prior to the start of NCAA participation in the lacrosse championship playoffs. Scott retired as head coach following this game to become athletic director. All American Franz Wittlesberger scored five goals in the final. Hopkins' senior defenseman Bob Barbera scored the only goal of his career in the championship game. Hopkins built a lead of 14–6 in the 3rd quarter, and was able to hold off the Terps despite Frank Urso's 3 goals and 5 assists. Freshman Kevin Mahon finished with 21 saves for the day.

This tournament is also notable for the Johns Hopkins versus Washington and Lee semifinal game won by Hopkins in a close 11 to 10 matchup. Trailing 10 to 7 in the fourth quarter, Hopkins scored four straight goals, including the game winner with two minutes left, to overcome previously unbeaten Washington and Lee. Rich Kowalchuk scored on a feed from Tom Myrick for the game-winning goal with 1:50 to play in the fourth quarter. Hopkins outshot Washington and Lee 21 to 5 in the 4th quarter. With the game tied and 4 minutes left to play, Washington and Lee with the ball went into a stall, where a bad pass turned possession over to Hopkins and leading to the game-winning goal.

Washington and Lee, which finished the season 15–1, was coming off their second straight undefeated regular season and had defeated Navy twice, Princeton, Duke, North Carolina, and Virginia before losing to Hopkins. Jack Emmer, who had previously led Cortland State to a tournament appearance coached the Generals to six straight NCAA tournaments from 1973 to 1978.

== Bracket ==
Quarterfinals; May 18, 1974
1	Maryland (6-1)	12
8	Rutgers (8-4)	6
4	Cornell (11-1)	15
5	Virginia	8
2	Johns Hopkins	18
7	Hofstra	10
3	Washington and Lee (14-0)	13
6	Navy (7-4)	10

Semifinals; May 25, 1974
1	Maryland	19
4	Cornell	10
2	Johns Hopkins	11
3	Washington and Lee	10

Championship; June 1, 1974
1	Maryland (8–2)	12
2	Johns Hopkins (12–2)	17

== Box scores ==
=== Finals ===
Team	1	2	3	4	Total
Johns Hopkins (12–2)	5	5	4	3	17
Maryland (8–2)	3	1	5	3	12
Johns Hopkins scoring – Franz Wittelsberger 5, Rick Kowalchuk 3, Rich Hirsch 3, Jack Thomas 3, Bill Nolan 2, Bob Barbera; Maryland scoring – Frank Urso 3, Dave Dempsey 2, Ed Mullen 2, Kevin Boland 2, Dave Hallock, Bob Mitchell, Roger Tuck; Shots: Johns Hopkins 59, Maryland 57; Shots: Johns Hopkins 21, Maryland 21

=== Semi-finals ===
Team	1	2	3	4	Total
Johns Hopkins	3	2	2	4	11
Washington and Lee	4	1	4	1	10
Johns Hopkins scoring – Rick Kowalchuk 3, Jim Cahill 2, Dale Kohler 2, Rich Hirsch, Pat Sinram, Franz Wittelsberger, Bill Nolan.; Washington and Lee scoring – Bill Rienhoff 3, Skip Lichtfuss 3, Bryan Chasney 2, Ted Bauer, Dave Warfield; Shots: Johns Hopkins 30, Washington and Lee 25

Team	1	2	3	4	Total
Maryland	3	5	7	4	19
Cornell	3	4	1	2	10
Maryland scoring – Ed Mullen 3, Dave Dempsey 3, Roger Tuck 3, Pat O'Meally 2, Frank Urso 2, Dino Mattessich 2, Kevin Boland 2, Bob Mitchell, Doug Radebaugh; Cornell scoring – Jim Trenz 3, Mike French 2, Bill Marino 2, Jon Levine 2, Tom Haggerty; Shots: Maryland 66, Cornell 30

=== Quarterfinals ===
Team	1	2	3	4	Total
Maryland	2	5	0	5	12
Rutgers	2	1	2	1	6
Maryland scoring – Frank Urso 3, Ed Mullen 2, Dave Dempsey 2, Pat O'Meally, Dino Mattessich, Brooks Sleeper, Doug Radebaugh, Mike Hynes; Rutgers scoring – Steve Arata 3, John Danowski, Mike Rinck, Pete Dorne; Shots: Maryland 63, Rutgers 31

Team	1	2	3	4	Total
Cornell	4	1	3	7	15
Virginia	1	3	2	2	8
Cornell scoring – Mike French 6, Jim Trenz 4, Jon Levine 3, Tom Haggerty, Steve Sanford; Virginia scoring – Barry Robertson 4, Greg Montgomery 2, Doug Cooper, Bruce Barker; Shots: Cornell 46, Virginia 44

Team	1	2	3	4	Total
Johns Hopkins	1	3	6	8	18
Hofstra	1	5	2	2	10
Johns Hopkins scoring – Franz Wittlesberger 7, Jack Thomas 4, Rick Kowalchuk 2, Rich Hirsch, Bill Nolan, Bill McCutcheon, Don Kurz, Mike Perez; Hofstra scoring – Kevin Hill 3, Pete Rose 2, Gary White 2, Jeff Fenton, Tom Calder, Teddy Betty; Shots: Johns Hopkins 39, Hofstra 26

Team	1	2	3	4	Total
Washington and Lee	4	3	4	2	13
Navy	4	2	3	1	10
Washington and Lee scoring – Dave Warfield 5, Ted Bauer 4, Bryan Chasney 2, Don Carroll, Skip Lichtfuss; Navy scoring – Wayne Dunham 2, Pat Meaney 2, Bob DeSimone, Tim Supko, Marty Mason, Dave Bayly, Bill Ayres, Joe Avveduti; Shots: Washington and Lee 41, Navy 41

== Outstanding players ==
The NCAA did not designate a Most Outstanding Player until the 1977 national tournament.

== See also ==
- 1974 NCAA Division II lacrosse tournament
