= Alexander Scott (painter) =

English painter

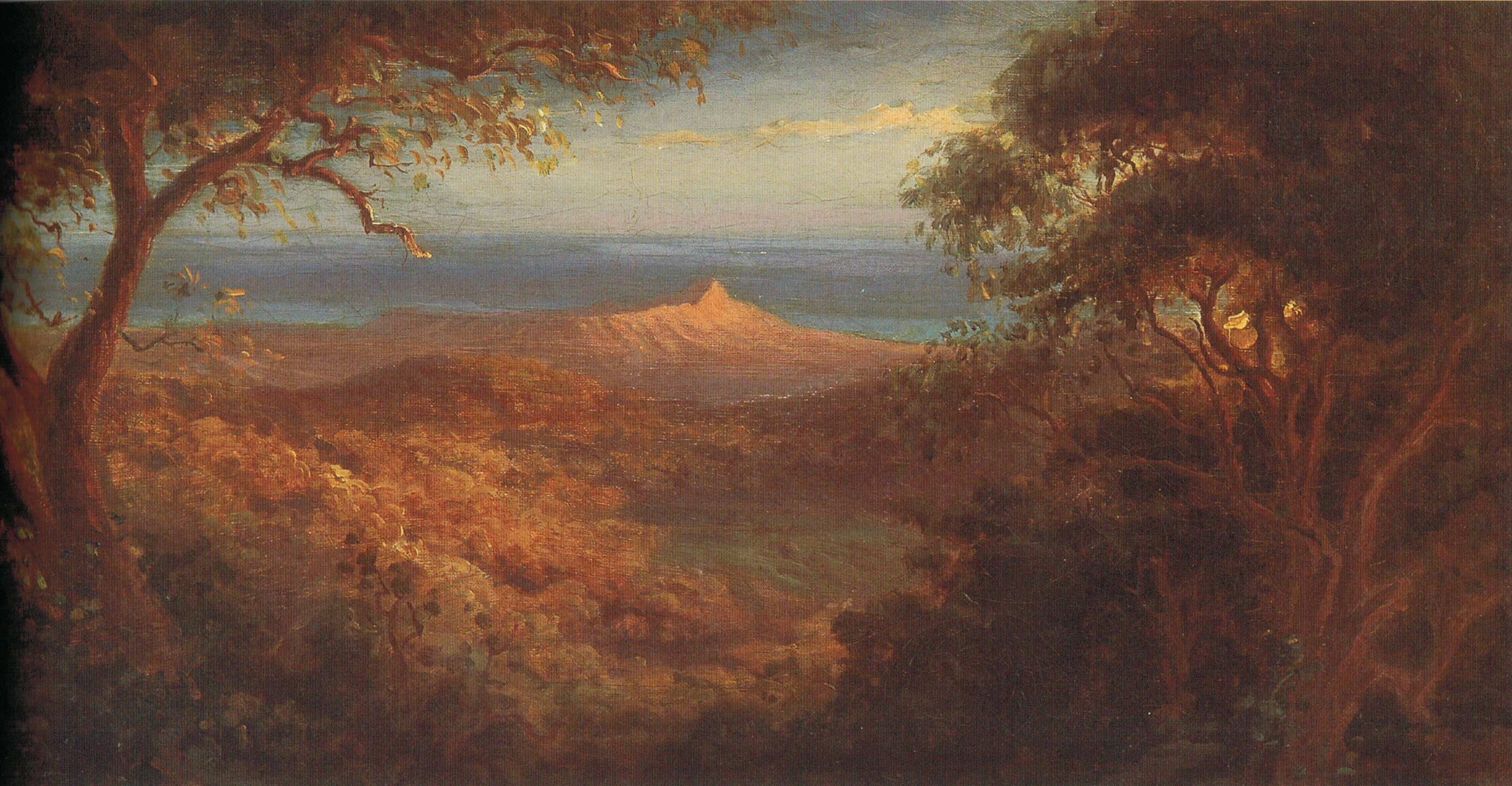
Diamond Head from Tantalus, oil on canvas painting by Alexander Scott, c.1906–8

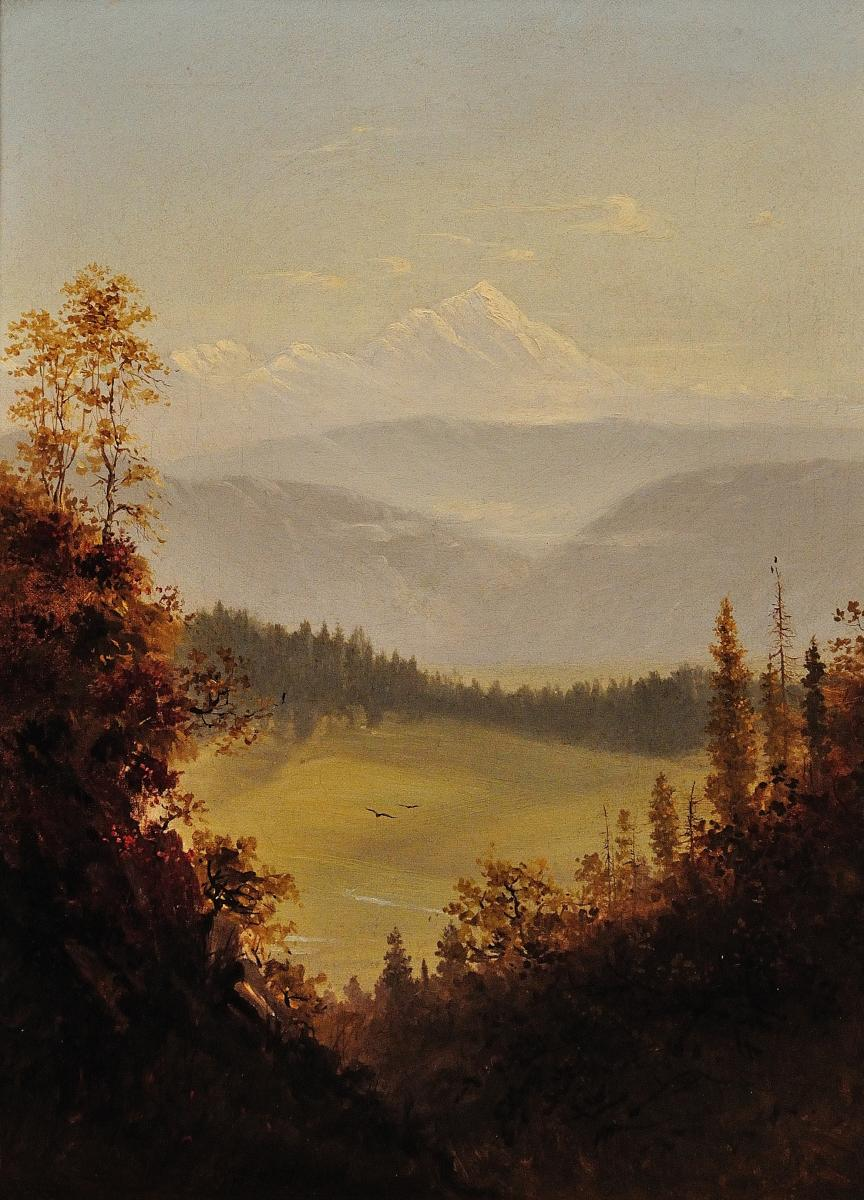
Alexander Scott - Nanga Parbat, Kashmir (1882)

Alexander Scott (1854–1925) was a British landscape painter, the son of Thomas Dewell Scott, a noted portraitist for The Illustrated London News. He was in Hawaii by 1906, and stayed until 1908. Scott's 1910 portrait of William Goodell (1829–1894) hangs in the Mütter Museum in Philadelphia. Scott spent a number of years living in Darjeeling, India. With oil on canvas, Scott painted a wide range of subjects throughout his travels. Some of these subjects included portraits, the Himalayas, the Taj Mahal, the Sanchi Tope, etc. The Fine Art Society, London, exhibited Alexander Scott's painting and sketches of India and Kashmir in 1889, and also posthumously in 1932.

Scott was married to a woman from Philadelphia, Pennsylvania, USA, which is where he made his home for many years. Scott was also an avid collector of ancient artifacts, which he obtained from locations all over the world. In 1914 Scott began corresponding with the director of the University Museum in Philadelphia, USA, George Byron Gordon. This initial correspondence was with regard to his personal collection of artifacts that he thought the museum would be interested in purchasing. Originally, he considered selling his objects to the Fairmount Park Authorities in Philadelphia, but wanted to keep the collection together and believed the University of Pennsylvania's Museum would be the ideal final resting place for his objects. Photographs and descriptions of some of his collection were published in the Museum Journal in June 1914. Scott continued to make annual trips back to India. After some initial correspondence and meetings with Gordon in 1914, Scott requested to be given an official title to help him in acquiring objects during his next trip to India. He was given the title of Honorary Representative of Oriental Archaeologist at the University Museum of Philadelphia.

For the Alexander Scott Expedition to India (1915–1918), Scott was no longer selling his personal collection to the University Museum in Philadelphia, but specifically purchasing objects for the museum. He discussed potential finds with Dr Gordon throughout his travels, and often sent photographs and descriptions before making purchases. Occasionally, Scott took personal financial risks and purchased objects that he believed could not be passed up. This happened on occasions where Dr Gordon did not reply to Scott in a timely manner about whether or not to make the purchase in his letters.

While in India, Scott befriended the Director-General of Archaeology in India, Sir John Marshall. Scott painted for Marshall while staying at his camp in Taxila, where he also witnessed tribal fighting. Scott spent time in Gandhara country, Sanchi, Bhopal and visited the ancient city of Mattra, among other various locations. He visited excavation sites, painted, and searched for valuable objects to purchase for the museum. Many of his purchases came from private hands. On a later trip to Tibet, Scott obtained a number of other objects that the museum subsequently purchased.

Around 1917, Scott's first wife died. In 1920, at 64 years old, he remarried a Mabel Winifred Bowbeer. Alexander Scott died five years later in 1925, which is when Mrs Scott began corresponding with the museum and continued to do so until 1948.
