= Robert H. Scott (lacrosse coach) =

Biographical details
- Born: c. 1930
- Died: September 15, 2016 (aged 86); Towson, Maryland

Playing career
- c. 1950–1952: Johns Hopkins

Coaching career (HC unless noted)
- 1955–1974: Johns Hopkins

Head coaching record
- Overall: 158–55–1

Accomplishments and honors

Championships
- 1957, 1959, 1967, 1968, 1969, 1970, 1974 – NCAA Men's Lacrosse Championships

Awards
- 1965, 1968, 1972 USILA National Coach of the Year; 1977, National Lacrosse Hall of Fame

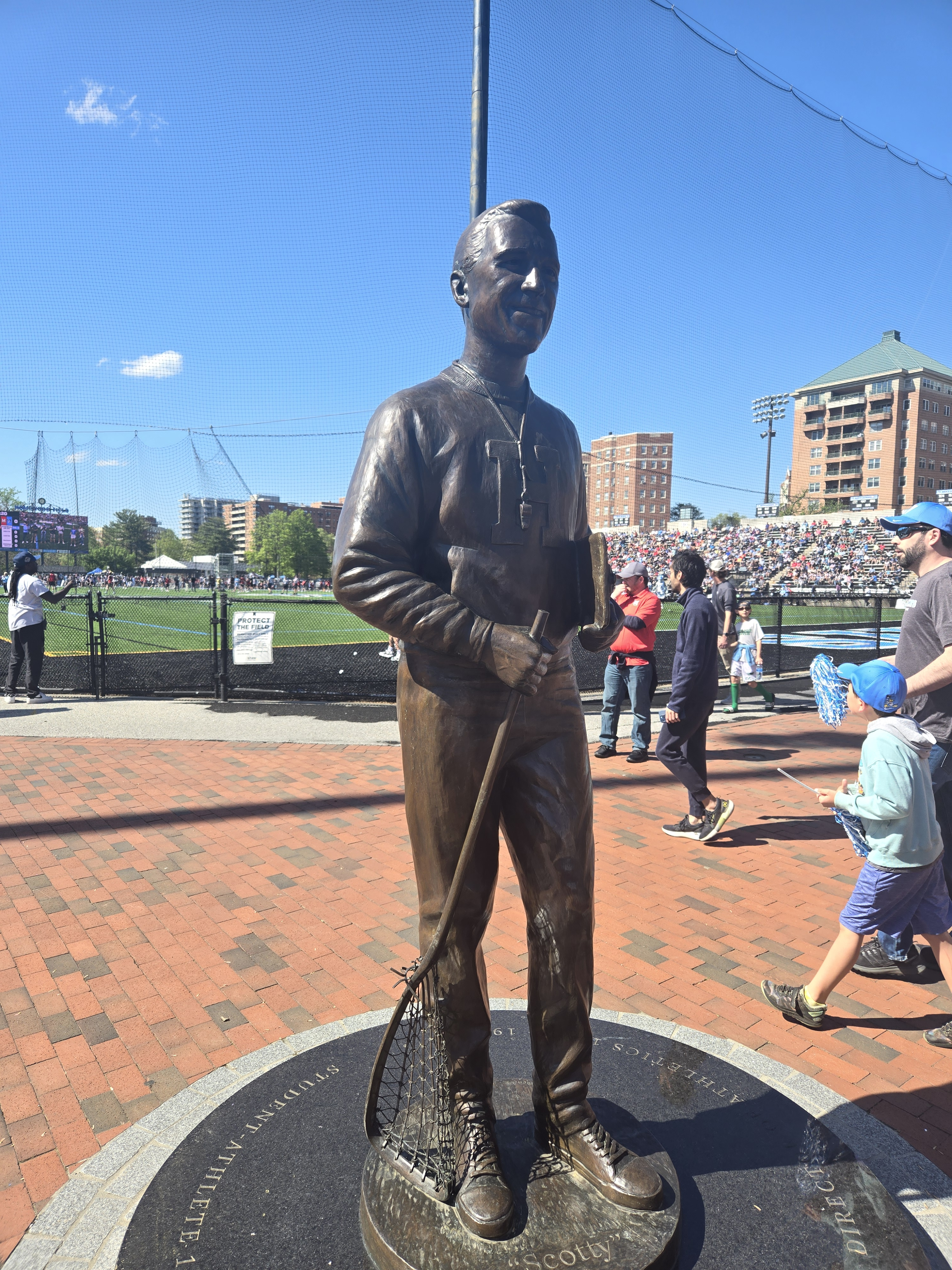
Statue of Bob Scott at Homewood Field

Robert H. Scott (c. March 17, 1930 – September 15, 2016) was a Hall of Fame lacrosse coach for the Johns Hopkins Blue Jays men's lacrosse team, serving from 1955 until 1974. He compiled a career record of 158 wins and 55 losses to go along with seven National Championships. He won the F. Morris Touchstone Award in being named the USILA National Coach of the Year in 1965, 1968 and 1972.

== Playing and coaching career ==
Scott was an All-American midfielder on the 1952 Johns Hopkins team and also played on the 1950 National Champion team. Scott coached future Hopkins head coach Henry Ciccarone and Willie Scroggs (Hopkins assistant, long time head coach at UNC). Scott was the coach for Hopkins in one of the classic NCAA lacrosse finals in 1973, where the Blue Jays held Hall of Fame midfielder Frank Urso in check, eventually losing 10 to 9 in two overtimes.

In 1976, Scott wrote the first edition of Lacrosse: Technique and Tradition, considered the ultimate guide to college lacrosse. He was inducted into the National Lacrosse Hall of Fame in 1977. He served as athletic director for Hopkins from 1974 to 1995. He died from complications of Parkinson's disease on September 15, 2016, at the age of 86.

In 2016, the Johns Hopkins men's lacrosse team erected a statue of Scott outside Homewood Field.

== Notable career accomplishments ==
- Coached Hopkins to seven national titles.
- Led Hopkins to a number 3 ranking and to the 1974 NCAA Championship his final season.
- Scott ranks 15th all-time in Division I lacrosse coaching wins.

=== Coaching record at Johns Hopkins ===
Year	Wins	Losses	Percent	NCAA Tournament Results or USILA Title	National Rank
1974	12	2	.857	NCAA Title	3
1973	11	2	.764	NCAA Finals	2
1972	11	2	.846	NCAA Finals	4
1971	3	7	.357	--	--
1970	9	1	.900	USILA Title	--
1969	9	1	.900	USILA Title	--
1968	10	1	.909	USILA Title	--
1967	11	1	.917	USILA Title	--
1966	5	6	.455	--	--
1965	9	2	.818	--	--
1964	5	5	.500	--	--
1963	6	4	.600	--	--
1962	8	3	.727	--	--
1961	8	3	.727	--	--
1960	7	2	.778	--	--
1959	8	2	.800	USILA Title	--
1958	8	1	.889	--	--
1957	8	0	1.000	USILA Title	--
1956	6	4	.600	--	--
1955	4	6	.400	--	--
