= Cretan Chronicles =

Cretan Chronicles is a trilogy of single-player role-playing fantasy gamebooks written by John Butterfield, David Honigmann and Philip Parker, and illustrated by Dan Woods. The Cretan Chronicles were published by Puffin between 1985 and 1986 under the Adventure Gamebooks banner, which also covered the more popular Fighting Fantasy and the related Sorcery! series, as well as the one-off Shakespearean-era role-playing game Maelstrom.

== The books ==
The trilogy consists of:

1. Bloodfeud of Altheus
2. At the Court of King Minos
3. Return of the Wanderer.

== Story ==
The reader controls Altheus, brother of the legendary hero Theseus, who in this series was killed in his quest to slay the Minotaur of Crete (in the original myth Theseus was victorious over the Minotaur, and Altheus does not appear). Told of this state of affairs by the messenger god Hermes, Altheus embarks on a mission of vengeance.

In Bloodfeud of Altheus, the young hero chooses a patron god from among six of the Olympians (Athena, Ares, Hera, Aphrodite, Apollo or Poseidon), and sets out for Athens to meet with his father, King Aegeus, then to gain passage to Crete. The book ends when Altheus's ship manages to get past Talos, the bronze giant, and arrives in Crete.

In the next book, At the Court of King Minos, Altheus has arrived on Crete and must deal with the members of Minos's court while trying to enter the labyrinth beneath Minos's palace and succeed where his brother failed. After killing the Minotaur, Altheus escapes from the palace and sails away with the king's daughter, Ariadne.

In the final book, Return of the Wanderer, Altheus is condemned by the gods to wander in search of redemption for sins he has committed against Ariadne.

== Details ==
Each book is set in the mythological world of Ancient Greece. The series incorporates a set of characteristics differing from the Fighting Fantasy series, including combat statistics Might and Protection, and Honour and Shame ratings. Might is "a combination of [Altheus's] natural ability and the value of the strongest weapon he is carrying", while Protection is a combination of "inborn skill at dodging and the sum total of the armour he happens to be wearing". Honour is gained by victory in combat, and may be used up in appeals to the gods or to gain a temporary increase in Might or Protection in combat. Shame cannot be eradicated once acquired, and "is accumulated by such cultural faux pas as slaying one's opponent after he has surrendered, or failing to perform heroic deeds". If Altheus ever accumulates more Shame than Honour, he will be "overwhelmed by the burden of his heroic conscience" and kill himself on the spot.

Altheus chooses a patron deity at the start of Bloodfeud of Altheus, but also maintains standings with other gods, being either in Favour, Neutral, or in Disfavour with each deity. Actions appeasing or angering the gods may change these ratings, and in turn the ratings determine how the gods react to and assist Altheus at various points in the story. Certain patrons give particular benefits - for example Ares gives a bonus in battle.

Another difference from the Fighting Fantasy books is the way that the protagonist's health is represented. Instead of having a stamina attribute which decreases as the character is injured, there are four simple stages to measure health: healthy, wounded, seriously wounded and dead. These are automatically reset after a battle. While seriously wounded a combatant is only allowed to add the roll of one die to their Might instead of two to reflect their weakened state.

The books have around 500–600 paragraphs and are therefore slightly longer than the standard Fighting Fantasy books. They are also physically larger, and similarly sized to Steve Jackson's Sorcery! series.

The Cretan Chronicles also use a unique system known as "Taking a Hint". At times the reader may want to perform non-standard actions. These are not offered in the text, but are available when the paragraph number is in italic type, by adding 20 to the paragraph number. If there is no non-standard action at that point which a Bronze-Age hero would have thought of, the reader pays a penalty in either Honour or Shame (or both), for trying to be ahead of his time. (If a player's patron is Athena, the penalty is only to honour, never shame; if it's Apollo, god of prophecy, no penalty applies.)

== See also ==
- Mazes and Minotaurs, a role-playing game also set in the world of ancient Greek myth.
