= Alex Scott (cricketer) =

English cricketer (born 1990)

Personal information
- Full name: Alex James Denis Scott
- Born: 4 May 1990 (age 36); Hong Kong
- Batting: Right-handed
- Bowling: Right-arm off break

Domestic team information
- Years: Team
- 2010–2012: Oxford University
- 2011: Oxford MCCU

Career statistics
Competition	First-class
Matches	4
Runs scored	60
Batting average	15.00
100s/50s	–/–
Top score	27
Balls bowled	536
Wickets	16
Bowling average	19.25
5 wickets in innings	–
10 wickets in match	–
Best bowling	4/52
Catches/stumpings	1/–
- Source: Cricinfo, 9 March 2020

Alex James Denis Scott (born 4 May 1990) is a Hongkonger former first-class cricketer.

Scott was born in British Hong Kong in May 1990. He later studied in England at Keble College, Oxford. While studying at Oxford he played first-class cricket for both Oxford University and Oxford MCCU from 2010–11, making four appearances. (Note: Oxford MCCU differed from Oxford University Cricket Club in that it is open to students at Oxford Brookes University, whereas Oxford University Cricket Club is exclusively for students of the constituent colleges of the University of Oxford.) Three of these were for Oxford University against Cambridge University in The University Match, in addition to one match for Oxford MCCU against Sussex. Playing as a right-arm off break bowler, he took 16 wickets at an average of 19.25 and best figures of 4 for 52. 8 of these wickets came in The University Match of 2010.
