= Scott Allen =

Scott Allen may refer to:

- Scott Allen (figure skater) (born 1949), American figure skater
- Scott Allen (footballer) (born 1975), Australian rules footballer
- Scott Allen (ice hockey) (born 1966), ice hockey center and assistant coach
- Scott Allen (politician) (born 1965), American politician and businessman in Wisconsin
- Scott-David Allen (born 1973), singer-songwriter

== See also ==
- Scott Allan (born 1991), Scottish footballer
- Scott Allan (sailor) (born 1946), American Olympic sailor
