= Peninsula University Hospital =

Coordinates: 38°9′3″S 145°7′43″E

- Bayside Health

Geography
- Location: 2 Hastings Road, Frankston, (Mornington Peninsula), Victoria, Australia

Organisation
- Care system: Medicare
- Type: General and speciality
- Affiliated university: Monash University, Deakin University

Services
- Emergency department: Yes
- Beds: 454

History
- Founded: 30 November 1941; 84 years ago

Links
- Website: www.peninsulahealth.org.au

Peninsula University Hospital (formerly Frankston Hospital) is a 454-bed public hospital located in the Melbourne suburb of Frankston in Victoria, Australia. It opened as the Frankston Community Hospital on 30 November 1941.

It is the largest provider of general and speciality health care for Melbourne's Mornington Peninsula, and is the region's chief provider of acute secondary and tertiary medical and surgical services.

The hospital has specialisations in mental health, maternity (midwifery) and pediatrics. It also has one of the busiest emergency departments in Victoria with 49 beds and around 63,000 presentations a year. The department was upgraded in 2015 at a cost of A$81 million.

It is one of two hospitals in the Peninsula Health network, the second being Rosebud Hospital, which together support the network's smaller specialist campuses for community health, dentistry, physical and psychiatric rehabilitation, aged (elderly) and palliative care in Frankston, Hastings, Mornington, Mount Eliza and Rosebud.

The hospital was renamed to Peninsula University Hospital in 2026, to coincide with the opening of a new clinical services tower and an ongoing partnership with Monash University.

== Services ==
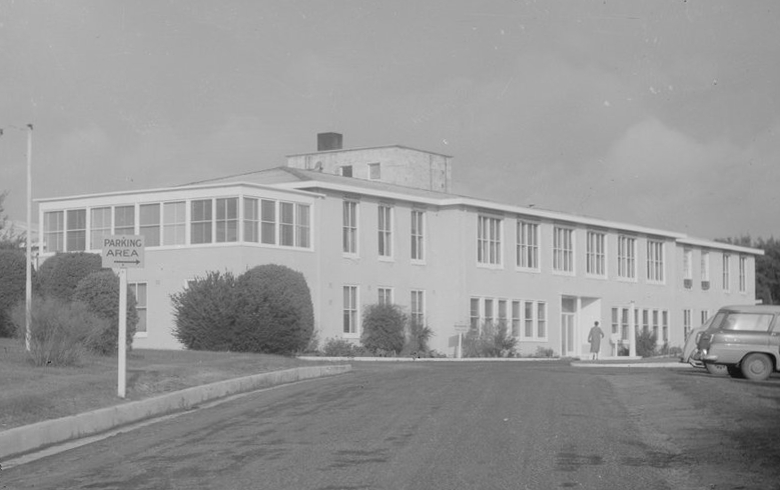
Frankston Hospital in the 1940s

Peninsula University Hospital provides general and speciality health care services in the following areas:

Allied Health

- Nutrition and Dietetic Services
- Occupational Therapy
- Physiotherapy
- Integrating Care
- Speech Pathology Services

Cancer Services

- Breast Cancer Support Service
- Oncology Day Unit
- Radiotherapy Services

Cardiac Services

- Cardiac Angiography
- Cardiology Department
- Chronic Heart Failure Program
- Coronary Care Unit

Emergency Medicine

- Frankston Emergency Department
- Medical Assessment and Planning Unit (MAPU)
- Response, Assessment and Discharge (RAD) Unit

Home-based Services

- Hospital in the Home
- Midwifery Home Care Service
- Peninsula Post Acute Care (PENPAC)

Intensive Care Unit

Medical Services

- Dermatology
- Diabetes & Endocrinology
- Gastroenterology
- General Medicine
- Haematology
- Infectious Diseases
- Medical Wards
- Neurology
- Renal Medicine and Haemodialysis
- Respiratory Services
- Rheumatology
- Stroke Unit

Neuropsychology and Psychiatric Service

Outpatient Service

Palliative Care Services

Peninsula Amputee Program

Social Work Services

Surgical Services

- Anaesthetics
- Day Surgery Unit
- General Surgery
- Operating Theatres
- Short Stay Unit
- Surgical Wards

Women's, Children's and Adolescent Health

- Children's and Adolescent Health
- Midwifery Inpatient Services
- Peninsula Health Maternity Services
- Special Care Nursery
- Women's Services
