= 2015 Big Ten women's lacrosse tournament =

American college lacrosse tournament

The 2015 Big Ten Women's Lacrosse Tournament was held April 30 to May 3 at High Point Solutions Stadium in Piscataway, New Jersey. The winner of the tournament received the Big Ten Conference's automatic bid to the 2015 NCAA Division I Women's Lacrosse Championship. All six conference teams competed in the inaugural event. The tournament format is single elimination. The seeds were based upon the teams' regular season conference record.

== Standings ==
Seed	School	Conference	Overall
1	Maryland ‡*	5–0	21–1
2	Penn State	4–1	16–5
3	Northwestern	3–2	14–7
4	Ohio State	2–3	13–8
5	Rutgers	1–4	2–16
6	Michigan	0–5	5–12
‡ Big Ten regular season champions. * National champions

== Schedule ==
Session	Game	Time*	Matchup	Score	Television
Quarterfinals – Thursday, April 30
1	1	3:30 pm	#3 Northwestern vs. #6 Michigan	13–9	BTN Plus
1	2	6:00 pm	#4 Ohio State vs. #5 Rutgers	17–7	BTN Plus
Semifinals – Friday, May 1
1	1	5:30 pm	#2 Penn State vs. #3 Northwestern	13–10	Big Ten Network
1	2	8:00 pm	#1 Maryland vs. #4 Ohio State	11–10	Big Ten Network
Championship – Sunday, May 3
2	3	12:00pm	#2 Penn State vs. #4 Ohio State	13–11	ESPNU
*Game times in EST. # – Denote tournament seeding.

== Bracket ==
High Point Solutions Stadium – Piscataway, New Jersey

Quarterfinals; April 30
3	Northwestern	13
6	Michigan	9
4	Ohio State	17
5	Rutgers	7

Semifinals Game; May 1
2	Penn State	13
3	Northwestern	10
1	Maryland	10
4	Ohio State	11

Championship; May 3
2	Penn State	13
4	Ohio State	11
