= Alexander Scott (geologist) =

Scottish geologist

Dr Alexander Scott FRSE FGS (1890–1951) was a 20th-century Scottish geologist. He was an expert on clays needed for the ceramic industry.

== Life ==
He was born in Glasgow on 4 July 1890. He studied Science at Glasgow University graduating MA in 1910 and BSc in 1911. Continuing as a postgraduate he gained his doctorate (DSc) in 1916.

In 1914 he began lecturing in Petrology at Oxford University, but this was only for one academic year. In 1916 he appears as the Physical Chemist in charge of the Radiometric Laboratory at Glasgow University. In 1918 he became Assistant Principal at the Central School of Science at Stoke-on-Trent. Here he was advisor to companies such as Royal Doulton, Spode, Wedgwood and Minton.

In 1919 he was elected a Fellow of the Royal Society of Edinburgh. His proposers were John Horne, Ben Peach, Sir John Smith Flett and Thomas James Jehu. He was elected a Fellow of the Geological Society in 1926.

He died on 18 August 1951.
