= Alexander Ritchie Scott =

Scottish mathematician and statistician

Dr Alexander Ritchie Scott FRSE (1874–27 November 1962) was a 20th-century Scottish mathematician and statistician.

== Life ==
He was born in Edinburgh and educated at George Heriot's School. He studied mathematics and science at the University of Edinburgh graduating with a BSc in 1894. He then spent some time in the Challenger Expedition Office in Edinburgh, doing statistical analysis. In 1896 he became a Research Fellow at the University of Edinburgh, and taught mathematics for 11 years. He then spent a year as Assistant Registrar at the University of the Cape of Good Hope in South Africa. Returning to the UK in 1909 he became Principal of the Beaufoy Institute in London where he remained for 30 years. He was given an honorary doctorate (DSc) by the University of London.

In World War I he was Director of Returns and Assistant Director of Statistics for the Ministry of Food.

In 1919 he was elected a Fellow of the Royal Society of Edinburgh. His proposers were David Fowler Lowe, John Brown Clark, Sir Edmund Taylor Whittaker and Cargill Gilston Knott.

He retired in 1939 and returned to Scotland. He died in Perth on 27 November 1962

== Artistic recognition ==
His photographic portrait is held by the Scottish National Portrait Gallery.

== Publications ==
- A Complete School Algebra (1935)
