= 1974 NCAA Division II lacrosse tournament =

1974 NCAA Division II Men's Lacrosse Championship
Tournament information
- Sport: College lacrosse
- Location: United States
- Venue(s): SUNY Cortland Stadium Complex; Cortland, NY
- Participants: 8

Final positions
- Champions: Towson State (1st)
- Runner-up: Hobart

Tournament statistics
- Matches played: 7
- Goals scored: 194 (27.71 per match)
- Top scorer(s): Rick Gilbert, Hobart (20)

The 1974 NCAA Division II Lacrosse Championship was the first annual single-elimination tournament to determine the national champions of NCAA Division II men's college lacrosse in the United States. That year's championship game was played at the SUNY Cortland Stadium Complex at SUNY Cortland in Cortland, New York.

Three editions of the NCAA Division I Lacrosse Championship were contested before a separate championship was established for Division II programs. In addition, two USILA "small college" tournaments were held in 1972 and 1973.

Towson State defeated Hobart in the final, 18−17 (in double overtime), to win their only national title. Wayne Eisenhut scored his fifth goal with 6 seconds left in the first overtime to win the game. Towson scored 7 goals in the final period to tie the game and send it into overtime. Eisenhut scored the final two goals in overtime for Towson (there was no sudden death overtime in this final). Hal Draffen scored 8 goals for Hobart in the game, while Hobart all-timer Rick Gilbert finished the DII tournament as the leading scorer with 20 goals. Towson defeated two NCAA Division I tournament teams, #5 seed UVA and #7 seed Hofstra during the regular season.

== Qualification ==
All Division II men's lacrosse programs were eligible for this championship with a total of eight teams invited.

Team	Appearance	Previous
Adelphi	1st	–
Baltimore	1st	–
Hobart	1st	–
Roanoke	1st	–
SUNY Cortland	1st	–
Towson State	1st	–
UMBC	1st	–
Washington College	1st	–

== Bracket ==
Quarterfinals
Adelphi	14
Washington College	13
Towson State	22
Baltimore	11
SUNY Cortland	16
UMBC	13
Hobart	15
Roanoke	6

Semifinals
Adelphi	9
Towson State	22
SUNY Cortland	10
Hobart	14

Championship; Cortland, NY; May 25th
Towson State	18**
Hobart	17

== See also ==
- 1974 NCAA Division I lacrosse tournament
