= Bert Scott =

Scottish footballer

Personal information
- Full name: Robert Scott
- Date of birth: 20 May 1930
- Place of birth: Bellshill, Scotland
- Date of death: 2015 (aged 84–85)
- Place of death: Lancashire, England
- Position: Right winger

Senior career*
Years	Team	Apps	(Gls)
1950–1951	Dunfermline Athletic	5	(1)
1953–1954	Alloa Athletic	25	(4)
1954–1959	Accrington Stanley	149	(32)
1959–1960	Wrexham	2	(0)
1960	Oldham Athletic	9	(1)
	Nelson	?	(?)
	Bacup Borough	?	(?)
Total		190	(38)
- * Club domestic league appearances and goals

Robert Scott (20 May 1930 – February 2015) was a Scottish footballer, who played as a right winger in the Football League.
