= Bobby Scott (Australian footballer) =

Australian rules footballer

Personal information
- Full name: Robert William Scott
- Born: 13 July 1887; Chelsea, Victoria
- Died: 4 February 1957 (aged 69); Sorrento, Victoria
- Original team: North Melbourne Juniors
- Height: 173 cm (5 ft 8 in)
- Weight: 71 kg (157 lb)

Playing career^{1}
Years	Club	Games (Goals)
1910–11	Richmond	12 (7)
- ^{1} Playing statistics correct to the end of 1911.

Robert William Scott (13 July 1887 – 4 February 1957) was an Australian rules footballer who played with Richmond in the Victorian Football League (VFL).
