= Shawn Nadelen =

American lacrosse player and coach

Personal information
- Nationality: American
- Born: April 16, 1979 (age 47) Henrietta, New York, U.S.
- Height: 6 ft 0 in (183 cm)
- Weight: 200 lb (91 kg; 14 st 4 lb)

Sport
- Position: Defense/Midfield
- Shoots: Right
- NLL draft: 30th overall, 2001; New Jersey Storm
- NLL teams: Philadelphia Wings; Minnesota Swarm; New Jersey Storm
- MLL team: Washington Bayhawks
- Pro career: 2001–2011

Shawn Nadelen (born April 16, 1979) is a retired professional lacrosse player and the current head men's lacrosse coach at Towson University.

He attended Johns Hopkins University where he made two NCAA Tournament Final Four appearances with the Blue Jays as a long stick midfielder.

== MLL career ==
Nadelen was selected by the Bayhawks as the 15th overall pick in the 2001 MLL Collegiate Draft. He has played his entire field lacrosse career with Bayhawks organization. Nadelen helped win two Major League Lacrosse Championships: 2002 and 2005.

He was named to the 2006 MLL All-Star Team.

Nadelen retired in June 2011 after being named the head men's lacrosse coach at Towson University.

== NLL career ==
Nadelen played for the Philadelphia Wings, Minnesota Swarm, and the New Jersey Storm from 2002 until his retirement in 2011. In 2006, with the Wings he recorded a total of ten points (3G, 7A) and 53 loose balls in 13 games played.

The Rochester, NY native represented the United States in the 2004 Heritage Cup, an international box lacrosse tournament that takes place every two years, and has been named to Team USA in the 2007 World Indoor Lacrosse Championships.

== Coaching career ==
Nadelen Named Towson University Head Lacrosse Coach Division I lacrosse program.

Since 2005, Nadelen has served on the coaching staff of the Men’s Lacrosse team at Towson University. Nadelen was an Assistant Men’s Lacrosse Coach with the Princeton University Tigers from 2002-2004.

Nadelen's career goal is to be a Head Coach of a Division I lacrosse program.

== Statistics ==
=== NLL ===
		Regular Season						Playoffs
Season	Team	GP	G	A	Pts	LB	PIM	GP	G	A	Pts	LB	PIM
2002	New Jersey	13	5	11	16	70	6	--	--	--	--	--	--
2003	New Jersey	12	2	7	9	67	8	--	--	--	--	--	--
2004	Philadelphia	11	1	9	10	67	9	--	--	--	--	--	--
2005	Minnesota	5	2	2	4	30	0	--	--	--	--	--	--
2005	Philadelphia	8	0	5	5	37	6	--	--	--	--	--	--
2006	Philadelphia	13	3	7	10	53	10	--	--	--	--	--	--
2007	Philadelphia	13	1	6	7	62	15	--	--	--	--	--	--
2008	Philadelphia	12	1	7	8	88	18	1	0	2	2	3	4
2009	Philadelphia	13	0	10	10	61	12	--	--	--	--	--	--
2010	Philadelphia	2	0	1	1	10	0	--	--	--	--	--	--
2011	Philadelphia	12	0	4	4	41	6	--	--	--	--	--	--
NLL totals		114	15	69	84	586	90	1	0	2	2	3	4

=== MLL ===
		Regular Season							Playoffs
Season	Team	GP	G	2ptG	A	Pts	LB	PIM	GP	G	2ptG	A	Pts	LB	PIM
2001	Baltimore	7	1	0	1	2	6	0	2	0	0	0	0	3	0.5
2002	Baltimore	12	3	0	0	3	27	2	2	0	0	0	0	2	1.5
2003	Baltimore	10	0	0	1	1	31	4	2	0	0	0	0	5	0
2004	Baltimore	9	0	0	0	0	18	1	1	0	0	0	0	2	0
2005	Baltimore	12	0	0	0	0	22	2	2	0	0	0	0	0	0
2006	Baltimore	12	0	0	0	0	27	1	-	-	-	-	-	-	-
2007	Washington	9	1	0	0	1	24	3	-	-	-	-	-	-	-
2008	Washington	12	0	0	0	0	30	3.5	-	-	-	-	-	-	-
2009	Washington	9	0	0	0	0	14	1	-	-	-	-	-	-	-
MLL Totals		92	5	0	2	7	199	17.5	9	0	0	0	0	12	2
