= Robert H. Scott III =

American economist

- Born: Robert Haywood Scott III; United States
- Citizenship: American
- Education: University of Missouri–Kansas City (PhD)
- Known for: Research on real estate, household debt, financial literacy and gambling statistics.
- Scientific career
- Fields: Economics; institutional economics; financial economics
- Workplaces: Monmouth University
- Thesis: The Determinants of Default on Credit Card Debt (2005)
- Doctoral advisor: James Sturgeon
- Website: www.monmouth.edu/directory/profiles/robert-h-scott-iii/

Robert Haywood Scott III is an American economist and writer who holds the Greenbaum/Ferguson/NJAR Endowed Chair in Real Estate Policy at Monmouth University.

His research focuses on real estate, credit markets, household debt, financial literacy and gambling statistics.

== Bibliography ==
- Bait and Switch: How Student Loan Debt Stifles Social Mobility (with Kenneth Mitchell & J. Patten; Palgrave Macmillan, 2023)
- Pesos or Plastic? Financial Inclusion, Taxation, and Development in South America (with Kenneth Mitchell; Palgrave Macmillan, 2019)
- Kenneth Boulding: A Voice Crying in the Wilderness (Palgrave Macmillan, 2015)
