= 2017 Big Ten women's lacrosse tournament =

American college lacrosse tournament

The 2017 Big Ten Women's Lacrosse Tournament was held May 5 and May 7 at the Field Hockey & Lacrosse Complex in College Park, Maryland. For the first time, the top four teams from regular season play will earn berths in the tournament. Previously all schools qualified for the tournament. The seeds were based upon the teams' regular season conference record. The tournament format is single elimination.

Maryland successfully defended its 2016 tournament title and received the Big Ten Conference's automatic bid to the 2017 NCAA Division I Women's Lacrosse Championship.

The 2017 tournament was the first tournament Johns Hopkins was eligible to participate in as it was their first season in the conference.

== Standings ==
Seed	School	Conference	Overall
1	Maryland ‡*	6–0	19-0
2	Penn State *	5–1	15–3
3	Northwestern *	4–2	10-9
4	Johns Hopkins *	3–3	11–6
5	Rutgers	2–4	8-8
6	Michigan	1–5	5-12
7	Ohio State	0–6	6–11
‡ Big Ten regular season champions. * Qualify for conference tournament.

== Schedule ==
Session	Game	Time*	Matchup	Score	Television
Semifinals – Friday, May 5
1	1	6:00 pm	#1 Maryland vs. #4 Johns Hopkins	19-16	Big Ten Network
1	2	8:30 pm	#2 Penn State vs. #3 Northwestern	12-11	Big Ten Network
Championship – Sunday, May 7
2	3	12:00pm	#1 Maryland vs. #3 Northwestern	14-6	Big Ten Network
*Game times in EST. # – Denote tournament seeding.

== Bracket ==
Field Hockey & Lacrosse Complex – College Park, Maryland

Semifinals; May 5
1	Maryland	19
4	Johns Hopkins	16
2	Penn State	11
3	Northwestern	12

Championship; May 7
1	Maryland	14
3	Northwestern	6
