= Keystone Library Network =

Consortium of libraries in Pennsylvania

Keystone Network's logo

The Keystone Library Network (KLN), founded in 1998, is a consortium of 18 libraries, including the 14 Pennsylvania State System of Higher Education's university libraries. The KLN provides its libraries with abstracts and access to 6,739 full-text journals and 10,000 business reports including country reports, industry reports, market research reports, and SWOT analyses.

The KLN maintains library catalogs of its members' holdings through Pennsylvania Inter-Library Online Technology (PILOT). The KLN enables users at each library to simultaneously search a group of shared resources provided by the KLN in addition to searching the individual library's locally subscribed resources.

== Member libraries ==
- Bloomsburg University – Harvey A. Andruss Library
- California University of Pennsylvania – Louis L. Manderino Library
- Cheyney University – Leslie Pinckney Hill Library
- Clarion University – Carlson Library
  - Suhr Library
- East Stroudsburg University – Kemp Library
- Edinboro University – Baron-Forness Library
- Geneva College – McCartney Library
- Harrisburg University – Harrisburg University of Science and Technology Library
- Indiana University of Pennsylvania – Libraries
  - Cogswell Music Library
  - Rhoades B. Stabley Library
  - Patrick J. Stapleton Library
- Lincoln University – Langston Hughes Memorial Library
- Kutztown University of Pennsylvania – Rohrbach Library
- Lock Haven University – Stevenson Library
- Mansfield University – North Hall Library
- Millersville University – Helen A. Ganser Library
- Shippensburg University – Lehman Library
- Slippery Rock University – Bailey Library
- Pennsylvania Department of Education – State Library of Pennsylvania
- West Chester University – Library Services
  - Francis Harvey Green Library
  - Presser Music Library
