= Indiana University of Pennsylvania =

Public university in Indiana, Pennsylvania, U.S.

Coordinates: 40.617°N 79.160°W

- Former names: Indiana Normal School (1875–1927); State Teachers College at Indiana (1927–1959); Indiana State College (1959–1965)
- Type: Public research university
- Established: 1875; 151 years ago
- Parent institution: Pennsylvania State System of Higher Education
- Academic affiliations: Keystone Library Network
- Endowment: $105.4 million (2025)
- President: Michael Driscoll
- Provost: Lara Luetkehans
- Faculty: 581 (fall 2023)
- Students: 9,246 (fall 2023)
- Undergraduates: 7,432 (fall 2023)
- Postgraduates: 1,814 (fall 2023)
- Location: Indiana, Pennsylvania, United States
- Campus: Rural, small town, 374 acres (1.51 km^{2})
- Colors: Crimson and Slate
- Nickname: Crimson Hawks
- Sporting affiliations: NCAA Division II – PSAC
- Website: iup.edu

The Indiana University of Pennsylvania (IUP) is a public research university in Indiana, Pennsylvania, United States. It is accredited by the Middle States Commission on Higher Education and classified among "R2: Doctoral Universities – High Spending and Doctorate Production". As of 2024, the university enrolled over 9,000 undergraduate and graduate students. It is governed by a local Council of Trustees and the Board of Governors of the Pennsylvania State System of Higher Education. IUP has branch campuses at Punxsutawney, Northpointe, and Monroeville.

== History ==
=== 19th century ===
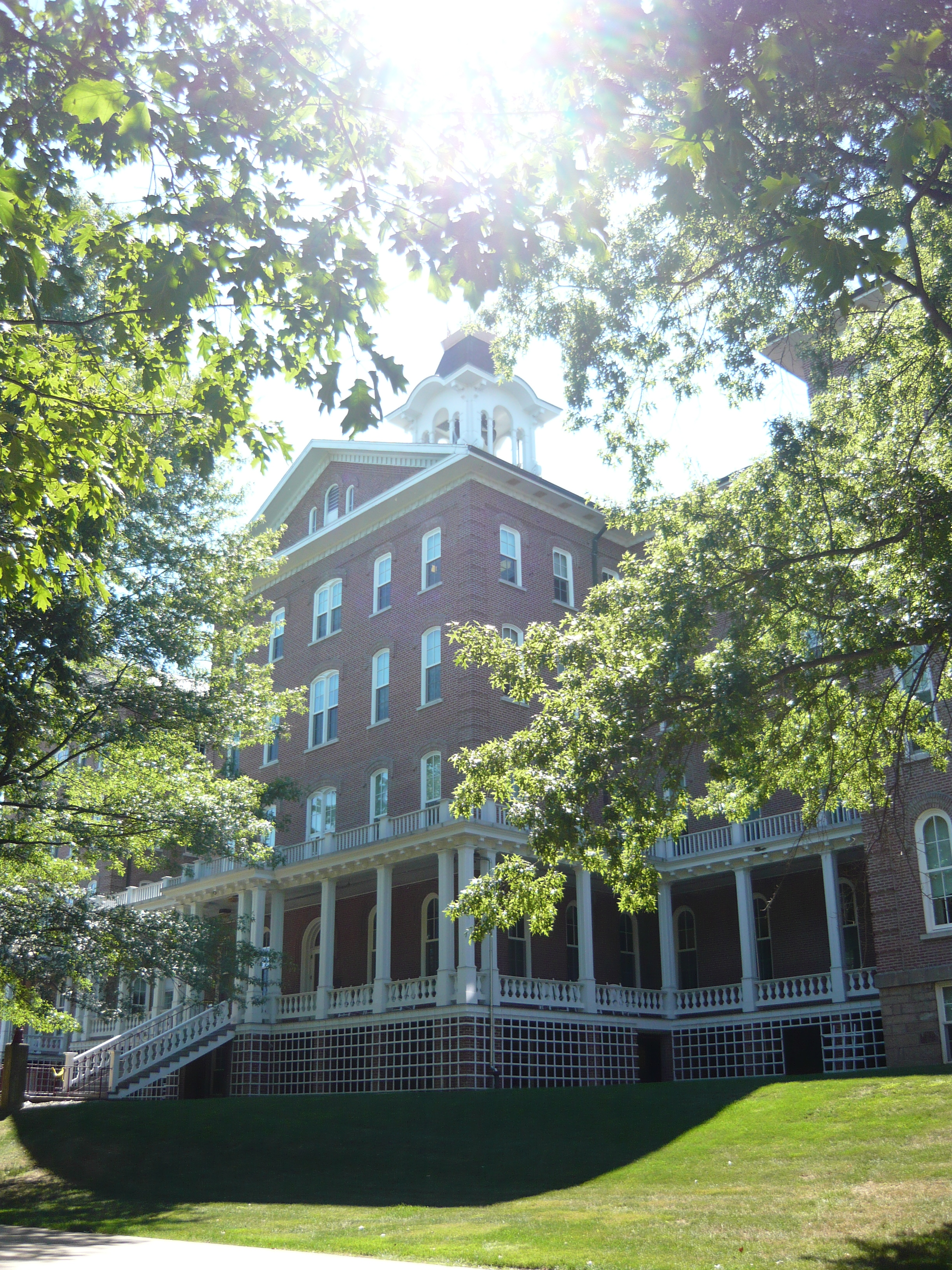
Sutton Hall

IUP was initiated as Indiana Normal School and first chartered by Indiana County investors in 1871. It was created under the Normal School Act of 1875. Normal schools established under the act were to be private corporations, independent of the state treasury. They were "state" schools only in the sense of being officially recognized by the commonwealth.

The school opened its doors in 1875 following the mold of the French École Normale. It enrolled 225 students. All normal school events were held within a single building which also contained a laboratory school for model teaching.

=== 20th century ===
Control and ownership of the institution passed to the Commonwealth of Pennsylvania in 1920. In 1927, by authority of the Pennsylvania General Assembly, it became State Teachers College at Indiana, with the right to grant degrees. The name was changed in 1959 to Indiana State College. In 1965, the institution became Indiana University of Pennsylvania, or IUP.

=== 21st century ===
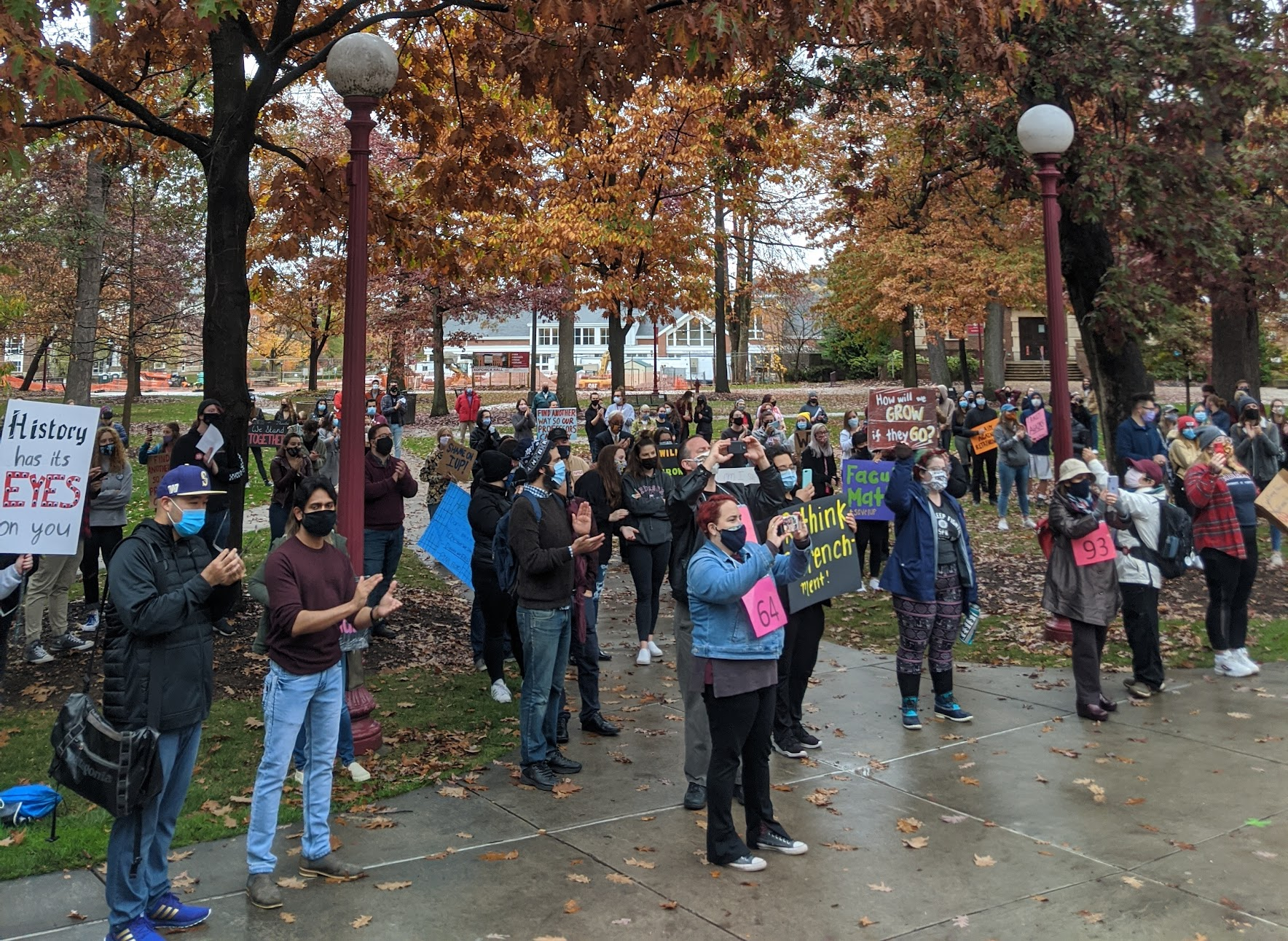
Protestors demonstrating in 2020 against layoffs at the university

IUP total enrollment peaked in the fall of 2012 at 15,379 and has declined steadily since. The decline caused financial difficulties for the university which struggled to cover costs for its 2010 dormitory expansion. In October 2020, IUP President Michael Driscoll announced restructuring and retrenchment plans related to leadership's NextGen proposal. Retrenchment or lay-off notices were issued to 81 tenured or tenure-track faculty on October 30, 2020, with another 47 expected before the end of the academic year. Fall 2022 enrollment was approximately 8,800. In the spring of 2023, in an effort to address decreasing enrollment and a budget deficit of $20 million, IUP eliminated five executive positions including four vice presidents and the chief marketing officer.

== Academics ==
Undergraduate demographics as of Fall 2023
Race and ethnicity	Total
White	75%
Black	10%
Hispanic	5%
Two or more races	4%
Unknown	2%
American Indian/Alaska Native	1%
Asian	1%
International student	1%
Economic diversity
Low-income (Note: The percentage of students who received an income-based federal Pell grant intended for low-income students.)	38%
Affluent (Note: The percentage of students who are a part of the American middle class at the bare minimum.)	62%

IUP offers over 140 undergraduate degree programs, over 70 minors, over 35 certificate programs and 70 graduate degree programs under the direction of eight colleges and schools:

- Eberly College of Business
- College of Education and Human Services
- College of Health Sciences
- College of Arts, Humanities, Media, and Public Affairs
- John J. and Char Kopchick College of Natural Sciences and Mathematics
- University College

Robert E. Cook Honors College was founded to offer a seminar style, discourse-based liberal studies curriculum.

=== Accolades ===
IUP students have earned accolades including: Fulbright Scholar, Phi Kappa Phi grants, Barry M. Goldwater Scholar, Ronald E. McNair Scholar, Gilman Scholar, Finnegan Fellow, and the PaSSHE Ali-Zaidi award.

=== The Penn ===
Founded in 1924, The Penn is IUP student body's official newspaper. It has won 3 Student Keystone Media Awards in 2018 and one nomination in 2019.

=== Rankings ===
The 2020 Washington Monthly College Rankings of National Universities ranks IUP 193rd out of 388 schools.

== Campus ==
Much of the central campus is in the Borough of Indiana. Other parts are in White Township, Indiana County.

IUP's 374-acre (1.51 km^{2}) main campus is a mix of 62 old and new red brick structures. Its original building, a Victorian structure named John Sutton Hall once housed the entire school. Sutton Hall has been named to the National Register of Historic Places. There was a fight to preserve Sutton Hall in 1974 when the administration scheduled it for demolition. Today it houses many administrative offices and reception areas. Breezedale Alumni Center is also listed on the National Register of Historic Places. The Victorian mansion was once home to John P. Elkin, a Pennsylvania Supreme Court Justice.

The campus encompasses a planetarium, a museum, a black box theater, the Hadley Union Building (HUB), an extensive music library, and a newly remodeled Cogswell Hall for the university's music community. Stapleton Library boasts 900,000-plus bound volumes and over 2 million microform units. At the heart of campus is the Oak Grove. In January 2000, IUP president Lawrence K. Pettit established a board to create the Allegheny Arboretum at IUP. This group works to furnish the Oak Grove with flora native to the region. The university also operates an academy of Culinary Arts in Punxsutawney and a police academy at its main campus.

The university's Student Cooperative Association also owns College Lodge several miles from campus. It provides skiing, biking, hiking, and disc golfing opportunities. Boat access is also made available through the Cooperative Association.

IUP has demolished most of its 1970s-era dormitories, beginning in 2006; facilities are being replaced with modern suites. Seven new dormitories were completed for fall 2009. Two more were completed by fall 2010. That semester, the ribbon cutting ceremony at Stephenson Hall was considered to have finished the four-year-long "residence hall revival". These suite-style rooms are similar to those being built at other universities in PASSHE.

Postcard depicting John Sutton Hall at Indiana Normal School

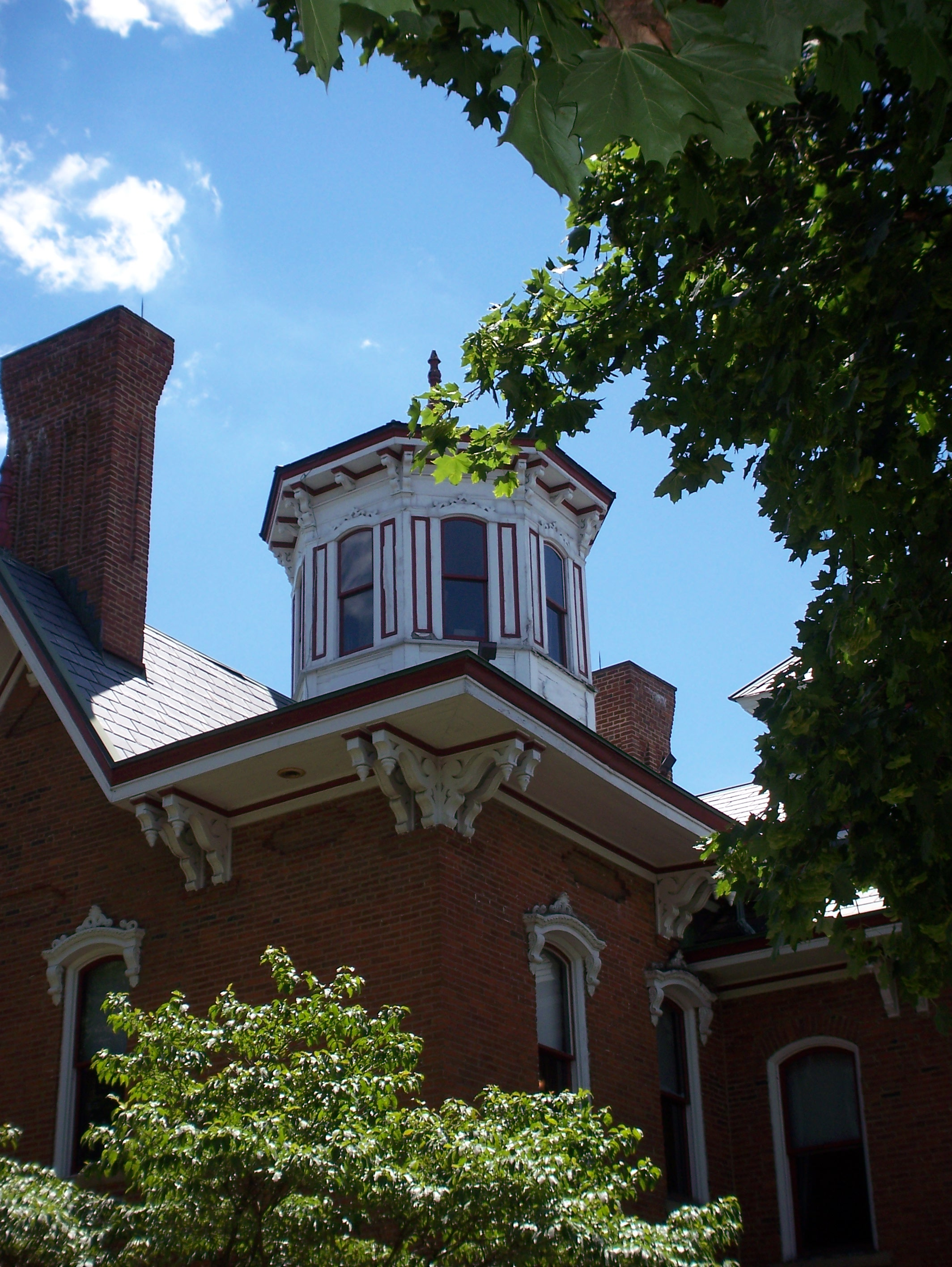
Breezedale Hall

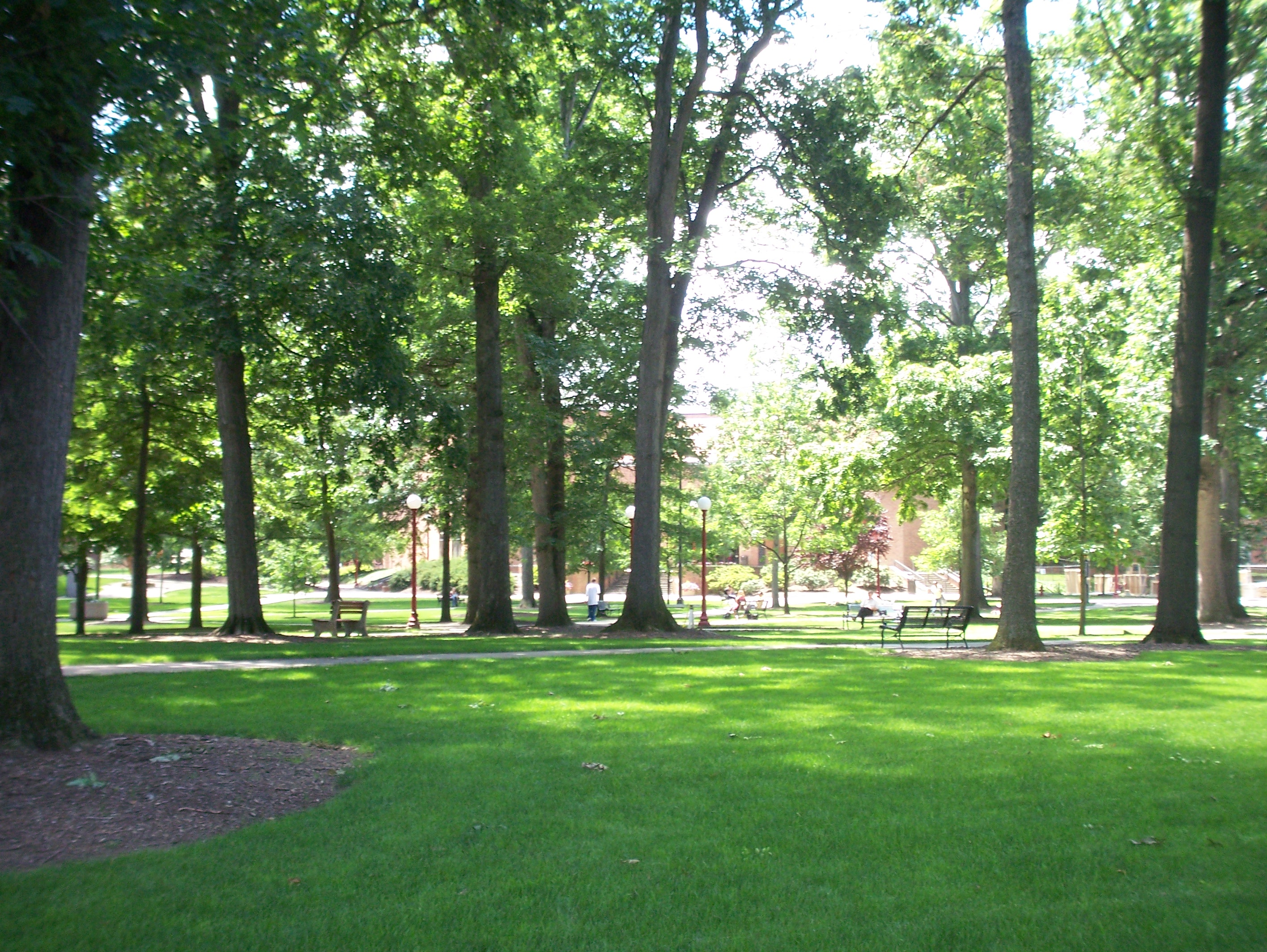
The Oak Grove looking towards Stapleton Library

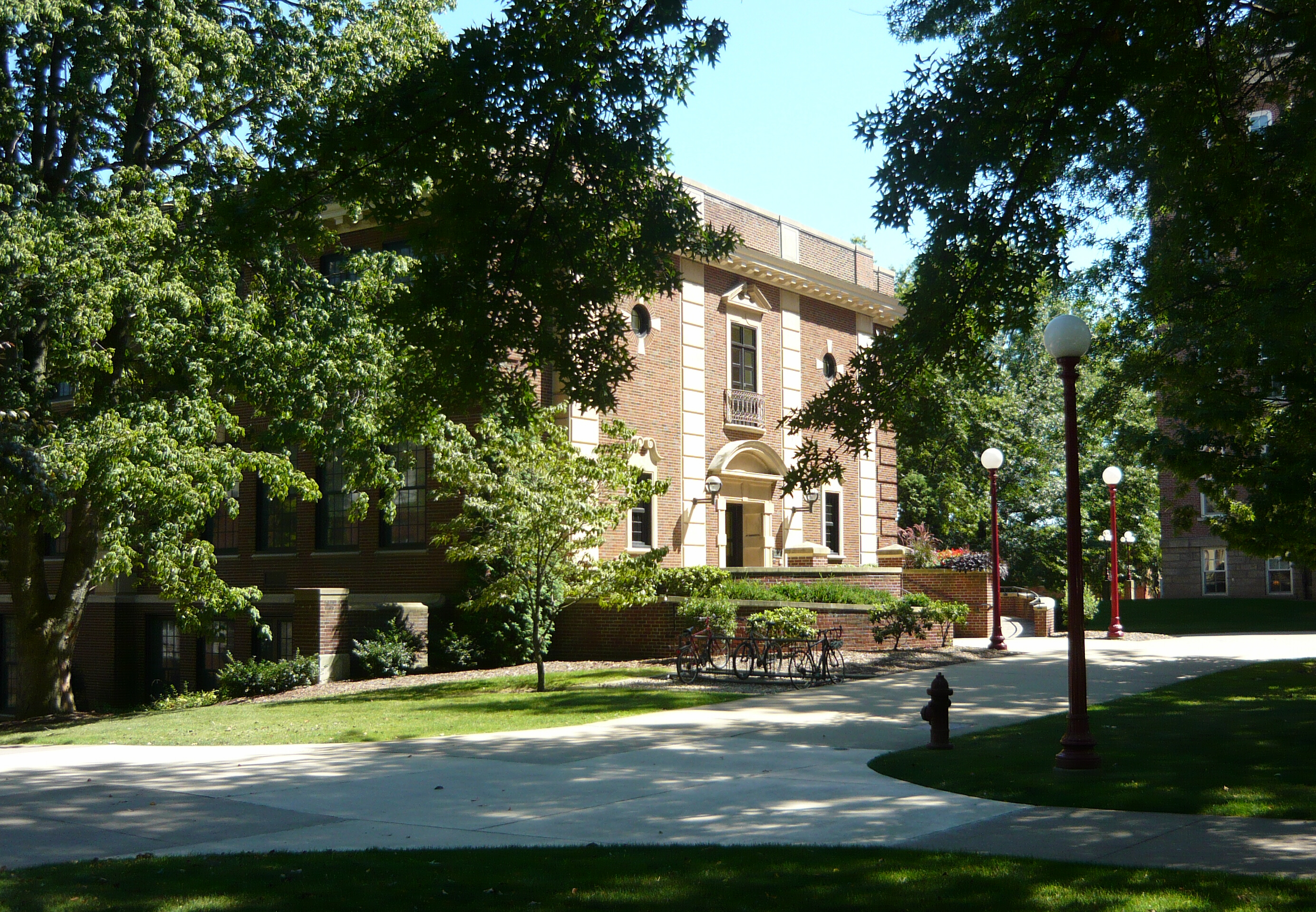
McElhaney Hall

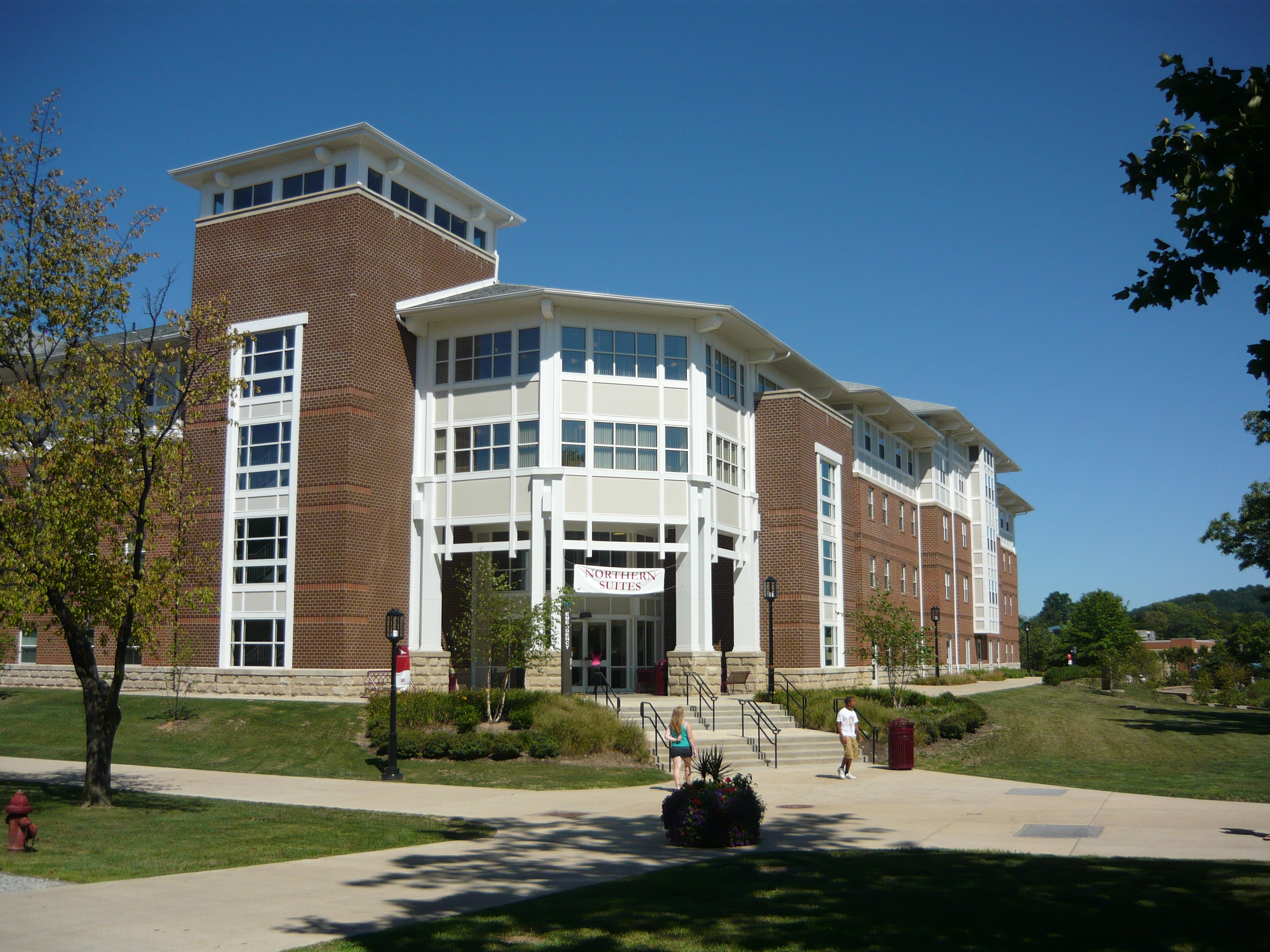
Northern Suites

== Athletics ==
IUP's athletic department sponsors 19 varsity sports, including eight for men and 11 for women. There are also club sports teams such as ice hockey and rugby. The Crimson Hawks, formerly known as the Indians, compete in the Pennsylvania State Athletic Conference (PSAC) of NCAA Division II.

IUP annually produces teams and individuals that compete for championships on the conference, regional and national levels. The 2004–05 school year saw 12 sports either send their teams or individuals to NCAA postseason competition.

The IUP football team has been to the NCAA Division II national title game twice (1990 and 1993). In both cases, IUP came up short, finishing the season as runner-up. While Division II teams rarely appear on television, IUP has appeared on regional telecasts in 1968 at the Boardwalk Bowl and 2006 against California University of PA. The team has also been on national TV while playing in those Division II national title games from 1990 and 1993. On November 2, 2006, a game against Slippery Rock was nationally televised on the TV channel, CSTV. Additionally, on September 15, 2011, a game against Bloomsburg was nationally televised on the TV channel CBS Sports Network as the NCAA Division II game of the week.

The IUP men's basketball team likewise lost the NCAA Division II national title game twice in 2010 and 2015.

The IUP rugby team finished 3rd in the Division I national championship in 2000, finishing behind California and Wyoming and ahead of fourth-place Army.

The IUP Men's ice hockey (ACHA Division 1) team won the CHMA season championship in 2018–2019, the CHMA playoff in 2019-2020 awarded a bid to the ACHA National Tournament as the 19th seed, but the tournament was canceled due to the COVID-19 pandemic. In the 2022–2023 season, IUP Men's Ice Hockey won the CHMA season and playoff championship and awarded a bid to the ACHA National Tournament as the 18th seed. Team captain Dominick Glavach was awarded the 2023 CHMA playoff MVP award and Head Coach Joe Honzo was awarded the CHMA Coach of the year.

The IUP men's lacrosse team were the 2018 and 2019 Three Rivers Conference Champions and were ranked 13th in the nation in Division II for the 2020 season.

== People ==
- Atrios, liberal blogger
- Gawdat Bahgat, political science professor, National Defense University
- Nellie Bly, journalist
- Tim Burns, businessman, politician
- Mark Critz, member of the House of Representatives (2010–2012)
- John Stuchell Fisher, former Governor of Pennsylvania
- Jim Haslett, member of the College Football Hall of Fame
- Chad Hurley, co-founder and CEO, YouTube
- Summers Melville Jack, former U.S. Representative
- Matthew Knisely, photojournalist
- John Murtha, former U.S. Representative
- Dana D. Nelson, literature professor and author
- Farah Quinn, Indonesian chef
- Patricia Robertson, NASA astronaut
- Art Rooney, founder of the Pittsburgh Steelers
- Johnny Sins, pornographic actor
- Jack Wagner, former Pittsburgh councilman, Pennsylvania State Senator, and Pennsylvania Auditor General
