= Budd Whitehill =

American multisport coach (1932–1993)

Biographical details
- Born: February 6, 1932
- Died: July 5, 1993 (aged 61)

Coaching career (HC unless noted)

Football
- 1956–1966: Lycoming (assistant)
- 1967–1971: Lycoming

Wrestling
- 1954–1955: Lock Haven
- 1956–1993: Lycoming

Baseball
- 1956–1962: Lycoming

Head coaching record
- Overall: 10–30 (football); 376–172–6 (wrestling duals)

Accomplishments and honors

Awards
- Lock Haven Hall of Fame (1991); National Wrestling Coaches Association Division III Hall of Fame (1991)

Budd F. Whitehall (February 6, 1932 – July 5, 1993) was an American football, wrestling and baseball coach and former player. He was a highly successful coach in multiple sports at Lock Haven University in Lock Haven, Pennsylvania and Lycoming College in Williamsport, Pennsylvania.

Prior to coaching, Whitehill played minor league baseball for two seasons (1953 to 1954).

== Head coaching record ==
=== Football ===
Year	Team	Overall	Conference	Standing	Bowl/playoffs
Lycoming Warriors (Middle Atlantic Conference) (1967–1971)
1967	Lycoming	3–5	3–5	7th (Southern College)	
1968	Lycoming	1–7	1–7	8th (Southern College)	
1969	Lycoming	1–7	1–7	7th (Southern College)	
1970	Lycoming	3–5	3–4	4th (Southern)	
1971	Lycoming	2–6	2–5	5th (Southern)	
Lycoming:		10–30	10–28		
Total:		10–30			
