= Pennsylvania State Athletic Conference =

Collegiate athletic conference competing in NCAA

- Association: NCAA
- Founded: 1951
- Commissioner: Steve Murray (since 1998)
- Sports fielded: 23; men's: 11; women's: 12
- Division: Division II
- No. of teams: 17 (18 in 2027, 17 in 2028)
- Headquarters: Lock Haven, Pennsylvania, U.S.
- Region: Pennsylvania and West Virginia
- Website: www.psacsports.org

Locations
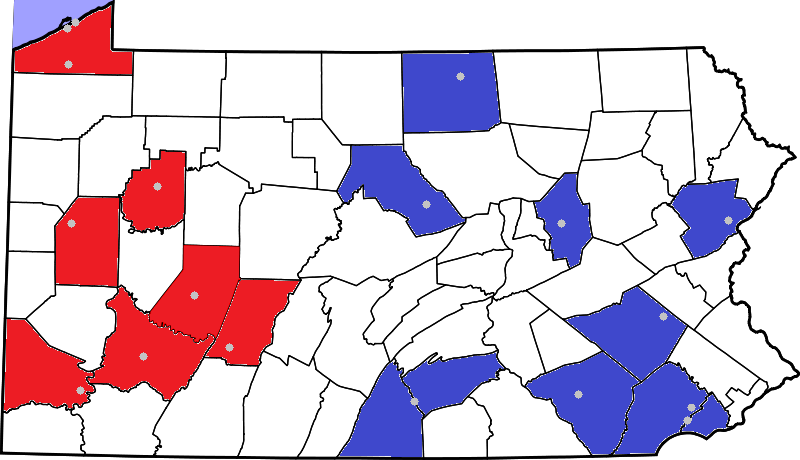

The Pennsylvania State Athletic Conference (PSAC) is a college athletic conference affiliated with the National Collegiate Athletic Association (NCAA) at the Division II level. The conference was originally formed in 1951 as the State Teachers Conference, and was temporarily named the Pennsylvania State Teachers College Conference in 1956 before assuming its current name in 1964.

The conference's 17 full-time members include 16 based in Pennsylvania and one in West Virginia. The conference's headquarters are in Lock Haven, Pennsylvania, and staffed by a commissioner, two assistant commissioners, and a director of media relations.

== History ==
The Pennsylvania State System of Higher Education organized the conference in 1951 to promote competition in men's sports amongst the system's 14 universities.

In 1977, following growing interest, the conference was expanded to offer competition in women's sports. From its inception, each conference member selected its own competitive division within the NCAA (I, II, or III).

In 1980, however, the presidents voted to reclassify the entire conference to Division II within the NCAA.

Pennsylvania State Athletic Conference
PSAC Member Locations:
full
full, campus of Pennsylvania Western University
full, campus of Commonwealth University of Pennsylvania
future
departing

Membership remained unchanged until the conference announced on June 18, 2007, that it had invited three private universities—Gannon University and Mercyhurst College in Erie, Pennsylvania and C.W. Post of Brookville, New York—to join the conference. Gannon and Mercyhurst left the Great Lakes Intercollegiate Athletic Conference to join the PSAC, effective July 1, 2008. C.W. Post became an associate member for football and field hockey.

In 2010, Seton Hill University was accepted to join the conference as an associate member for field hockey. With the transition of West Chester from Division I to Division II, the number of teams competing in field hockey increased from 10 to 12 for the 2011 season.

On August 19, 2012, the PSAC announced that Seton Hill and the University of Pittsburgh at Johnstown, formerly members of the West Virginia Intercollegiate Athletic Conference (WVIAC), would become full members beginning with the 2013–14 school year. This announcement was fallout from a split in the WVIAC that ultimately led to the formation of the Mountain East Conference (MEC). Although Seton Hill was one of the schools that initially broke away from the WVIAC, it chose not to join the MEC. The arrival of these two schools brought the PSAC to 18 full members, making it the largest NCAA all-sports conference in terms of membership at that time. While two other conferences briefly expanded to more members, the D-II Lone Star Conference to 19 in 2019–20 and the D-III USA South Athletic Conference to the same number in 2021–22, both have since reduced their memberships to less than 18, once again giving the PSAC the largest membership of any NCAA all-sports conference. (Note: After the LSC expanded to 19 members, it lost two to D-I transitions, Tarleton in 2020 and Texas A&M–Commerce in 2022, leaving it at 17 members. After a single school year as a 19-member league, the USA South amicably split into two leagues; eight members left to form the new Collegiate Conference of the South and 10 remained in the USA South, with one member leaving for a third conference.) (Note: While the D-III Middle Atlantic Conference, which had 18 members at two different times in the 21st century and now has 16, operates under a single administrative structure, it is actually an umbrella organization of three conferences. Its members are divided into two conferences, MAC Commonwealth and MAC Freedom, that each compete in the same set of 14 non-football sports, including men's and women's basketball. The third conference, known as the Middle Atlantic Conference (not to be confused with the umbrella organization), sponsors competition in 13 other sports, among them football, for Commonwealth and Freedom members.)

In March 2018, charter member Cheyney University, facing crises in enrollment, graduation rates, and finances, announced that it would leave NCAA Division II and the PSAC at the end of the 2017–18 school year. The school had dropped football in December 2017.

Later that year, the conference announced that it would expand into West Virginia, bringing in Shepherd University from the MEC as a full member effective with the 2019–20 school year. Shepherd is the first full PSAC member outside PA.

As of April 4, 2024, Mercyhurst announced that it will leave the PSAC to transition to NCAA Division I and join the Northeast Conference, beginning the 2024–25 academic year. The PSAC responded on June 26, 2025 by extending an invitation to Lackawanna College to join as a full member, becoming the third-ever institution (and first football-sponsoring institution) to transition from the National Junior College Athletic Association (NJCAA) directly into Division II.

On November 17, 2026, the Commonwealth University of Pennsylvania announced that they would cease operations at the Mansfield campus at the end of the 2027–28 academic year.

=== Role in Division I conference realignment ===
The PSAC played a little-known but nonetheless significant role in the history of NCAA Division I conference realignment. In 1986, the conference was seeking a way out of a football scheduling conundrum. The PSAC had 14 members at the time, and had been split into divisions for decades. One of the methods it historically used to determine a football champion involved a championship game between the winners of its two divisions. However, due to NCAA limits on regular-season games, every PSAC team had to leave a schedule spot open, with only the two division winners getting to play all of their allowed regular-season games. Then-conference commissioner Tod Eberle asked Dick Yoder, then athletic director at West Chester and member of the Division II council, to draft NCAA legislation that would allow the PSAC to play a conference title game that would be exempt from regular-season limits. The initial draft required that a qualifying league have 14 members and play a round-robin schedule within each division; only the PSAC then qualified.

Before Yoder formally introduced the proposal, he was approached by the Central Intercollegiate Athletic Association, which was interested in co-sponsoring the legislation because it was also split into football divisions and wanted the option of a championship game. Since the CIAA then had 12 members, Yoder changed the legislation to require 12 members instead of 14. Although at the time all NCAA legislation had to be approved by the entire membership, regardless of divisional alignment, the proposal passed with little notice. It was generally seen as a non-issue by Division I-A (now FBS) schools since no conference in that group then had more than 10 members. While the PSAC planned to stage its first exempt title game in 1988, it decided against doing so at that time because the D-II playoffs expanded from 8 to 16 teams that season, and it feared that the result of a title game could cost the league a playoff berth. The new NCAA rule would not see its first use until the Southeastern Conference took advantage of it by expanding to 12 members in 1991 and launching a title game the following year.

=== Chronological timeline ===
- 1951 – The Pennsylvania State Athletic Conference (PSAC) was founded as the State Teachers Conference (STCP). Charter members included Bloomsburg State Teachers College (now Commonwealth University-Bloomsburg), California State Teachers College (now PennWest California), Cheyney State Teachers College (now Cheyney University), Clarion State Teachers College (now PennWest Clarion), East Stroudsburg State Teachers College (now East Stroudsburg University), Edinboro State Teachers College (now PennWest Edinboro), Indiana State Teachers College (now Indiana University of Pennsylvania), Kutztown State Teachers College (now Kutztown University), Lock Haven State Teachers College (now Commonwealth University-Lock Haven), Mansfield State Teachers College (now Commonwealth University-Mansfield), Millersville State Teachers College (now Millersville University), Shippensburg State Teachers College (now Shippensburg University), Slippery Rock State Teachers College (now Slippery Rock University), and West Chester State Teachers College (now West Chester University), beginning the 1951–52 academic year.
- 1956 – The STCP was rebranded as the Pennsylvania State Teachers College Conference (PSTCC) in the 1956–57 academic year.
- 1964 – The PSTCC was rebranded as the Pennsylvania State Athletic Conference (PSAC) in the 1964–65 academic year.
- 1980 – The PSAC had joined the National Collegiate Athletic Association (NCAA) at the Division II ranks, transitioning from the National Association of Intercollegiate Athletics (NAIA), beginning the 1980–81 academic year.
- 2008:
  - Gannon University and Mercyhurst University joined the PSAC in the 2008–09 academic year.
  - Long Island University–Post (LIU Post) joined the PSAC as an affiliate member for field hockey and football in the 2008 fall season (2008–09 academic year).
- 2011 – Seton Hill University joined the PSAC as an affiliate member for field hockey in the 2011 fall season (2011–12 academic year).
- 2013:
  - LIU Post left the PSAC as an affiliate member for field hockey and football after the 2012 fall season (2012–13 academic year).
  - The University of Pittsburgh at Johnstown joined the PSAC (along with Seton Hill for all sports) in the 2013–14 academic year.
- 2018 – Cheyney left the PSAC to become an independent school without an affiliation with any athletic conference or any college sports organization after the 2017–18 academic year.
- 2019 – Shepherd University joined the PSAC in the 2019–20 academic year.
- 2024:
  - Mercyhurst left the PSAC to transition and join to the NCAA Division I ranks and the Northeast Conference (NEC) after the 2023–24 academic year.
  - Frostburg State University joined the PSAC as an affiliate member for field hockey in the 2024 fall season (2024–25 academic year).
- 2025 – Chestnut Hill College and Thomas Jefferson University (Jefferson) joined the PSAC as affiliate members for men's tennis in the 2026 spring season (2025–26 academic year).
- 2026:
  - Three institutions joined the PSAC as affiliate members, all effective in the 2026–27 academic year:
    - D'Youville University for women's tennis and women's wrestling
    - Daemen University for men's and women's tennis
    - and Felician University for women's wrestling.
- 2027 – Lackawanna College will join the PSAC, beginning the 2027–28 academic year.
- 2028 – Mansfield will leave the PSAC at the end the 2027–28 academic year; as the school will cease operations.

== Member schools ==
=== Current members ===
The PSAC currently has 17 full members, all but two being public schools. Also, only three of the 15 public members are outside of the Pennsylvania State System of Higher Education.

Institution	Location	Founded	Affiliation	Enrollment	Nickname	Joined (Note: Represents the calendar year when fall sports competition begins.)	Colors
Commonwealth University-Bloomsburg (Note: Formerly known as Bloomsburg University until 2022.)	Bloomsburg, Pennsylvania	1839	Public (Note: Part of the Pennsylvania State System of Higher Education (PASSHE).)	7,206	Huskies	1951	
Commonwealth University-Lock Haven (Note: Formerly known as Lock Haven University until 2022.)	Lock Haven, Pennsylvania	1870	Public	2,702	Bald Eagles	1951	
Commonwealth University-Mansfield (Note: Formerly known as Mansfield University until 2022.)	Mansfield, Pennsylvania	1857	Public	1,195	Mountaineers	1951	
East Stroudsburg University of Pennsylvania	East Stroudsburg, Pennsylvania	1893	Public	5,636	Warriors	1951	
Gannon University	Erie, Pennsylvania	1925	Catholic (Diocese of Erie)	4,665	Golden Knights	2008	
Indiana University of Pennsylvania	Indiana, Pennsylvania	1875	Public	9,081	Crimson Hawks	1951	
Kutztown University of Pennsylvania	Kutztown, Pennsylvania	1866	Public	7,468	Golden Bears	1951	
Millersville University of Pennsylvania	Millersville, Pennsylvania	1855	Public	7,009	Marauders	1951	
Pennsylvania Western University - California (Note: Formerly known as California University until 2022.)	California, Pennsylvania	1852	Public	2,717	Vulcans	1951	
Pennsylvania Western University - Clarion (Note: Formerly known as Clarion University until 2022.)	Clarion, Pennsylvania	1867	Public	1,743	Golden Eagles	1951	
Pennsylvania Western University – Edinboro (Note: Formerly known as Edinboro University until 2022.)	Edinboro, Pennsylvania	1857	Public	2,259	Fighting Scots	1951	
University of Pittsburgh at Johnstown	Johnstown, Pennsylvania	1927	Public (State-related)	1,809	Mountain Cats	2013	
Seton Hill University (Note: Seton Hill competed in the PSAC as an affiliate member for field hockey from the 2011 to 2012 fall seasons (2011–12 to 2012–13 school years).)	Greensburg, Pennsylvania	1883	Catholic (S.C.S.H.)	1,989	Griffins	2013	
Shepherd University	Shepherdstown, West Virginia	1871	Public	3,339	Rams	2019	
Shippensburg University of Pennsylvania	Shippensburg, Pennsylvania	1871	Public	5,165	Raiders	1951	
Slippery Rock University of Pennsylvania	Slippery Rock, Pennsylvania	1889	Public	8,394	The Rock	1951	
West Chester University of Pennsylvania (Note: West Chester had dual athletic conference membership with the Middle Atlantic States Collegiate Athletic Conference [MASCAC; now known as the Middle Atlantic Conferences (MAC)] from 1969–70 to 1973–74, and with the East Coast Conference (ECC) from 1974–75 to 1981–82, then the Golden Rams left the ECC and the NCAA Division I ranks in order to fully align with the PSAC and the NCAA Division II ranks.)	West Chester, Pennsylvania	1871	Public	17,202	Golden Rams	1951	

=== Future members ===
The PSAC will have one future full member, a private school:

Institution	Location	Founded	Affiliation	Enrollment	Nickname	Joining (Note: Represents the calendar year when fall sports competition begins.)	Colors	Current conference
Lackawanna College	Scranton, Pennsylvania	1894	Nonsectarian	1,939	Falcons	2027		Eastern Pennsylvania (EPAC) (Note: Currently an NJCAA athletic conference.) (NJCAA Region XIX)

=== Affiliate members ===
The PSAC has six affiliate members, all but one are private schools:

Institution	Location	Founded	Affiliation	Nickname	Joined (Note: Represents the calendar year when fall sports competition begins.)	PSAC sport(s)	Primary conference
Chestnut Hill College	Philadelphia, Pennsylvania	1924	Catholic (CSJ)	Griffins	2025	men's tennis	Central Atlantic (CACC)
Daemen University	Amherst, New York	1947	Nonsectarian	Wildcats	2026	men's tennis	East Coast (ECC)
Daemen University	Amherst, New York	1947	Nonsectarian	Wildcats	2026	women's tennis	East Coast (ECC)
D'Youville University	Buffalo, New York	1946	Catholic (Grey Nuns)	Saints	2026	women's tennis	East Coast (ECC)
D'Youville University	Buffalo, New York	1946	Catholic (Grey Nuns)	Saints	2026	women's wrestling	East Coast (ECC)
Felician University	Rutherford, New Jersey	1923	Catholic (CSSF)	Golden Falcons	2026	women's wrestling	Central Atlantic (CACC)
Frostburg State University	Frostburg, Maryland	1898	Public	Bobcats	2024	field hockey	Mountain East (MEC)
Thomas Jefferson University	Philadelphia, Pennsylvania	1824	Nonsectarian	Rams	2025	men's tennis	Central Atlantic (CACC)

=== Former members ===
The PSAC had two former full members, a public school and a private school:

Institution	Location	Founded	Affiliation	Enrollment	Nickname	Joined (Note: Represents the calendar year when fall sports competition begins.)	Left (Note: Represents the calendar year when spring sports competition ends.)	Colors	Current conference
Cheyney University of Pennsylvania	Cheyney, Pennsylvania	1837	Public (Note: Part of the Pennsylvania State System of Higher Education (PASSHE).)	642	Wolves	1951	2018		Independent
Mercyhurst University	Erie, Pennsylvania	1926	Catholic	2,801	Lakers	2008	2024		Northeast (NEC) (Note: Currently an NCAA Division I athletic conference.)

=== Former affiliate members ===
The PSAC had one former affiliate member, which was also a private school:

Institution	Location	Founded	Affiliation	Nickname	Joined (Note: Represents the calendar year when fall sports competition begins.)	Left (Note: Represents the calendar year when spring sports competition ends.)	PSAC sport(s)	Primary conference
Long Island University-Post	Brookville, New York	1954	Nonsectarian	Pioneers	2008	2013	Field hockey	Northeast (NEC) (Note: Currently an NCAA Division I athletic conference.) (Note: While LIU Post was a full member of the East Coast Conference (ECC) from 1989 to 2019, neither of its PSAC sports were sponsored by the ECC. In 2013, Post moved both of its PSAC sports to the Northeast-10 Conference (NE-10). In July 2019, Long Island University merged its two athletic programs - the LIU Post Pioneers and the Division I LIU Brooklyn Blackbirds - into a single Division I athletic program, the LIU Sharks. The merged program inherited Brooklyn's memberships in Division I and the Northeast Conference (NEC). Sports that had been sponsored by both campuses (among them field hockey) maintained LIU Brooklyn's NEC membership; sports that had been sponsored only by Post (among them football) became NEC members.)
Long Island University-Post	Brookville, New York	1954	Nonsectarian	Pioneers	2008	2013	Football	Northeast (NEC)

=== Membership timeline ===
Full member (all sports) Full member (non-football) Associate member (football) Associate member (sport)

== Sports ==
In wrestling; Bloomsburg, Clarion, Edinboro, and Lock Haven compete as members of the Division I Mid-American Conference. The PSAC held an annual championship open to all Division I and Division II teams, however with the transition of all of the former members of the Eastern Wrestling League into the MAC starting in 2019 the Division I level PSAC programs will focus on Division I level competition. The PSAC offers championships in the following sports.

A 2-divisional format is used for baseball, basketball (M / W), football, and tennis (W).
East
- Bloomsburg
- East Stroudsburg
- Kutztown
- Lock Haven
- Mansfield
- Millersville
- Shepherd
- Shippensburg
- West Chester
West
- California
- Clarion
- Edinboro
- Gannon
- IUP
- Pitt-Johnstown
- Seton Hill
- Slippery Rock
A 3-divisional format is used for softball.
East
- East Stroudsburg
- Kutztown
- Millersville
- Shepherd
- Shippensburg
- West Chester
Central
- Bloomsburg
- Clarion
- IUP
- Lock Haven
- Mansfield
- Pitt-Johnstown
West
- California
- Edinboro
- Gannon
- Seton Hill
- Slippery Rock
A 4-divisional format is used for volleyball.
Central
- Bloomsburg
- East Stroudsburg
- Kutztown
- Lock Haven
- Millersville
Northwest
- Clarion
- Edinboro
- Gannon
- Slippery Rock
Southeast
- Millersville
- Shepherd
- Shippensburg
- West Chester
Southwest
- California
- IUP
- Pitt-Johnstown
- Seton Hill

Conference sports
Sport	Men's	Women's
Baseball	✓	
Basketball	✓	✓
Cross Country	✓	✓
Field Hockey		✓
Football	✓	
Golf	✓	✓
Lacrosse		✓
Soccer	✓	✓
Softball		✓
Swimming & Diving	✓	✓
Tennis	✓	✓
Track & Field Indoor	✓	✓
Track & Field Outdoor	✓	✓
Volleyball		✓
Wrestling	✓	

=== Men's sponsored sports by school ===
School	Baseball	Basketball	Cross Country	Football	Golf	Soccer	Swimming & Diving	Tennis	Track & Field Indoor	Track & Field Outdoor	Wrestling	Total PSAC Sports
Bloomsburg	✓	✓	✓	✓		✓	✓	✓	✓	✓		9
California	✓	✓	✓	✓	✓	✓			✓	✓		8
Clarion	✓	✓		✓	✓		✓					5
East Stroudsburg	✓	✓	✓	✓		✓			✓	✓	✓	8
Edinboro		✓	✓	✓			✓	✓		✓		6
Gannon	✓	✓	✓	✓	✓	✓	✓				✓	8
Indiana	✓	✓	✓	✓	✓		✓		✓	✓		8
Kutztown	✓	✓	✓	✓				✓	✓	✓	✓	8
Lock Haven	✓	✓	✓	✓		✓				✓		6
Mansfield	✓	✓	✓						✓	✓		5
Millersville	✓	✓		✓	✓	✓		✓			✓	7
Pittsburgh-Johnstown	✓	✓	✓		✓	✓			✓	✓	✓	8
Seton Hill	✓	✓	✓	✓		✓			✓	✓	✓	8
Shepherd	✓	✓		✓	✓	✓						5
Shippensburg	✓	✓	✓	✓		✓	✓		✓	✓	✓	9
Slippery Rock	✓	✓	✓	✓		✓			✓	✓	(Note: Slippery Rock plans to reinstate wrestling in 2027–28.)	7
West Chester	✓	✓	✓	✓	✓	✓	✓	✓	✓	✓		10
Totals	16	17	14	15	8	12	7	5+3 (Note: Affiliate members Chestnut Hill, Daemen, and Jefferson.)	11	13	7	126

=== Women's sponsored sports by school ===
School	Basketball	Cross Country	Field Hockey	Golf	Lacrosse	Soccer	Softball	Swimming & Diving	Tennis	Track & Field Indoor	Track & Field Outdoor	Volleyball	Wrestling (Note: De facto Division I sport. These sports have a single NCAA championship open to members of all three divisions.)	Total PSAC Sports
Bloomsburg	✓	✓	✓		✓	✓	✓	✓	✓	✓	✓	✓		10
California	✓	✓		✓		✓	✓	✓	✓	✓	✓	✓		10
Clarion	✓	✓		✓		✓	✓	✓	✓	✓	✓	✓		10
East Stroudsburg	✓	✓	✓	✓	✓	✓	✓	✓	✓	✓	✓	✓	✓	13
Edinboro	✓	✓			✓	✓	✓	✓	✓	✓	✓	✓	✓	11
Gannon	✓	✓		✓	✓	✓	✓	✓				✓	✓	9
Indiana	✓	✓	✓		✓	✓	✓	✓	✓	✓	✓	✓		11
Kutztown	✓	✓	✓	✓	✓	✓	✓	✓	✓	✓	✓	✓		12
Lock Haven	✓	✓			✓	✓	✓	✓		✓	✓	✓	✓	10
Mansfield	✓	✓	✓			✓	✓			✓	✓			7
Millersville	✓	✓	✓	✓	✓	✓	✓	✓	✓	✓	✓	✓		12
Pittsburgh-Johnstown	✓	✓				✓	✓			✓	✓	✓	✓	8
Seton Hill	✓	✓		✓	✓	✓	✓		✓	✓	✓	✓		11
Shepherd	✓			✓	✓	✓	✓		✓			✓		7
Shippensburg	✓	✓	✓		✓	✓	✓	✓	✓	✓	✓	✓		11
Slippery Rock	✓	✓	✓		✓	✓	✓		✓	✓	✓	✓		10
West Chester	✓	✓	✓	✓	✓	✓	✓	✓	✓	✓	✓	✓		12
Totals	17	16	10+1 (Note: Affiliate member Frostburg State.)	9	13	17	17	12	13+2 (Note: Affiliate members Daemen and D'Youville.)	15	15	16	5+2 (Note: Affiliate members D'Youville and Felician.)	174

=== Other sponsored sports by school ===
School	Men			Women							
School	Lacrosse	Water Polo (Note: De facto Division I sport. These sports have a single NCAA championship open to members of all three divisions.)	Wrestling (Note: The PSAC members listed in this table all compete in Division I men's wrestling.)	Acrobatics & Tumbling (Note: Part of the NCAA Emerging Sports for Women program.) (Note: Expected to become an official NCAA championship sport in 2026–27.)	Bowling	Equestrian	Field Hockey (Note: Lock Haven competes in Division I field hockey.)	Gymnastics	Rugby	Stunt	Water Polo
Bloomsburg			MAC								
Clarion			MAC								
East Stroudsburg										IND	
Edinboro			MAC								
Gannon		WWPA		IND							WWPA
Kutztown				MEC	ECC						
Lock Haven			MAC				A-10				
Seton Hill	G-MAC					IND					
West Chester								GEC	NIRA		

In addition to the above:

- Edinboro sponsors coeducational varsity teams in esports and wheelchair basketball.
- Gannon recognizes its cheerleaders (both male and female) and all-female dance team as varsity athletes.
- Mansfield fields a varsity team in sprint football, a weight-restricted form of football played under standard NCAA rules but governed outside the NCAA.
- Shepherd and West Chester recognize their female cheerleaders, but not their male ones, as varsity athletes.

== Conference venues ==
School	Football stadium	Capacity	Basketball arena	Capacity	Other facilities
Bloomsburg	Robert B. Redman Stadium	4,775	Nelson Fieldhouse	3,000	Jan Hutchinson Field; Danny Litwhiler Field; Steph Pettit Stadium
California	Hepner-Bailey Field at Adamson Stadium	6,500	Convocation Center at PennWest California	4,000	Wild Things Park; Phillipsburg Soccer Facility; Lilley Field; Hamer Hall
Clarion	Memorial Field	5,000	W.S. Tippin Gymnasium	2,500	
East Stroudsburg	Eiler-Martin Stadium	6,000	Koehler Fieldhouse	2,000	Whitenight Field; Mitterling Field; Zimbar Field
Edinboro	Sox Harrison Stadium	6,000	McComb Fieldhouse	3,500	Zafirovski Sports and Recreation Dome
Gannon	McConnell Family Stadium	2,500	Hammermill Center	2,800	
IUP	George P. Miller Stadium	6,000	Kovalchick Convention and Athletic Complex	6,000	Dougherty Field; Podbielski Field; Memorial Field House; South Campus Field
Kutztown	University Field at Andre Reed Stadium	5,600	Keystone Field House	3,400	O'Pake Field House; Keystone Field; North Campus Field
Lock Haven	Hubert Jack Stadium	3,500	Thomas Fieldhouse	2,500	Foundation Field; Lawrence Field; Charlotte Smith Field; Zimmerli Gymnasium
Mansfield	non-football school		Decker Gymnasium	2,000	Lutes Field; Spaulding Field; Shaute Field; Soccer Field
Millersville	Biemesderfer Stadium	6,500	Pucillo Gymnasium	2,850	Cooper Park; Millersville Softball Field
Pittsburgh-Johnstown	non-football school		Sports Center	2,400	Point Stadium (baseball)
Seton Hill	Offutt Field	5,000	Salvitti Gymnasium	1,200	Dick's Sporting Goods Field
Shepherd	Ram Stadium	5,000	Butcher Center	—N/a	Fairfax Baseball Field; Shepherd Softball Field
Shippensburg	Seth Grove Stadium	7,700	Heiges Field House	2,768	Robb Field; David See Field; Art Fairchild Field
Slippery Rock	N. Kerr Thompson Stadium	10,000	Morrow Field House	3,000	Egli Soccer Field; Critchfield Park
West Chester	Tomlinson-Fillippo Field at Farrell Stadium	7,500	Hollinger Field House	2,500	Vonnie Gros Field; Serpico Stadium

== Notable alumni ==
The following is a list of alumni of the respective universities, including before the formation of the Conference in 1951.

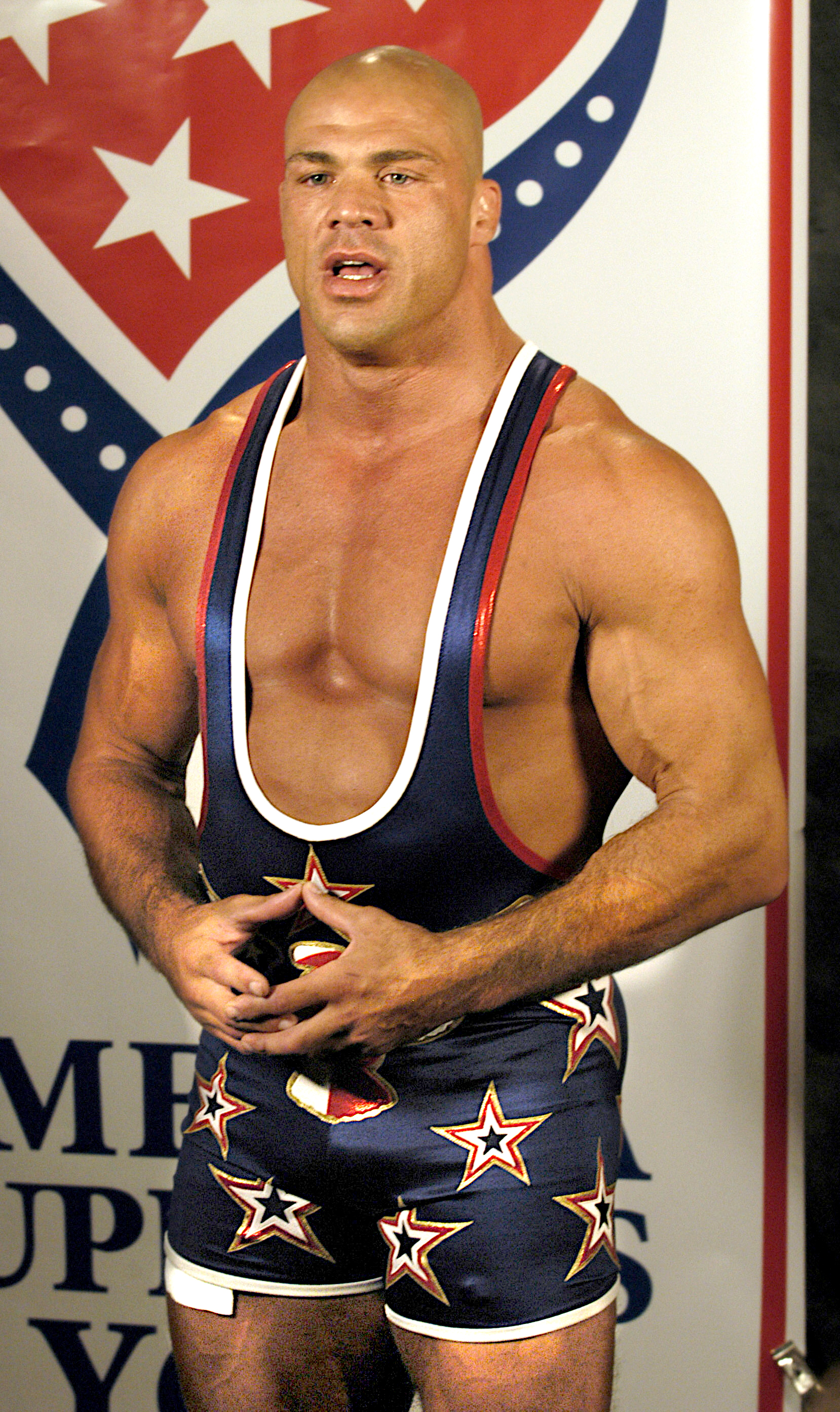
Kurt Angle, gold medalist, freestyle wrestling, 1996 Summer Olympics

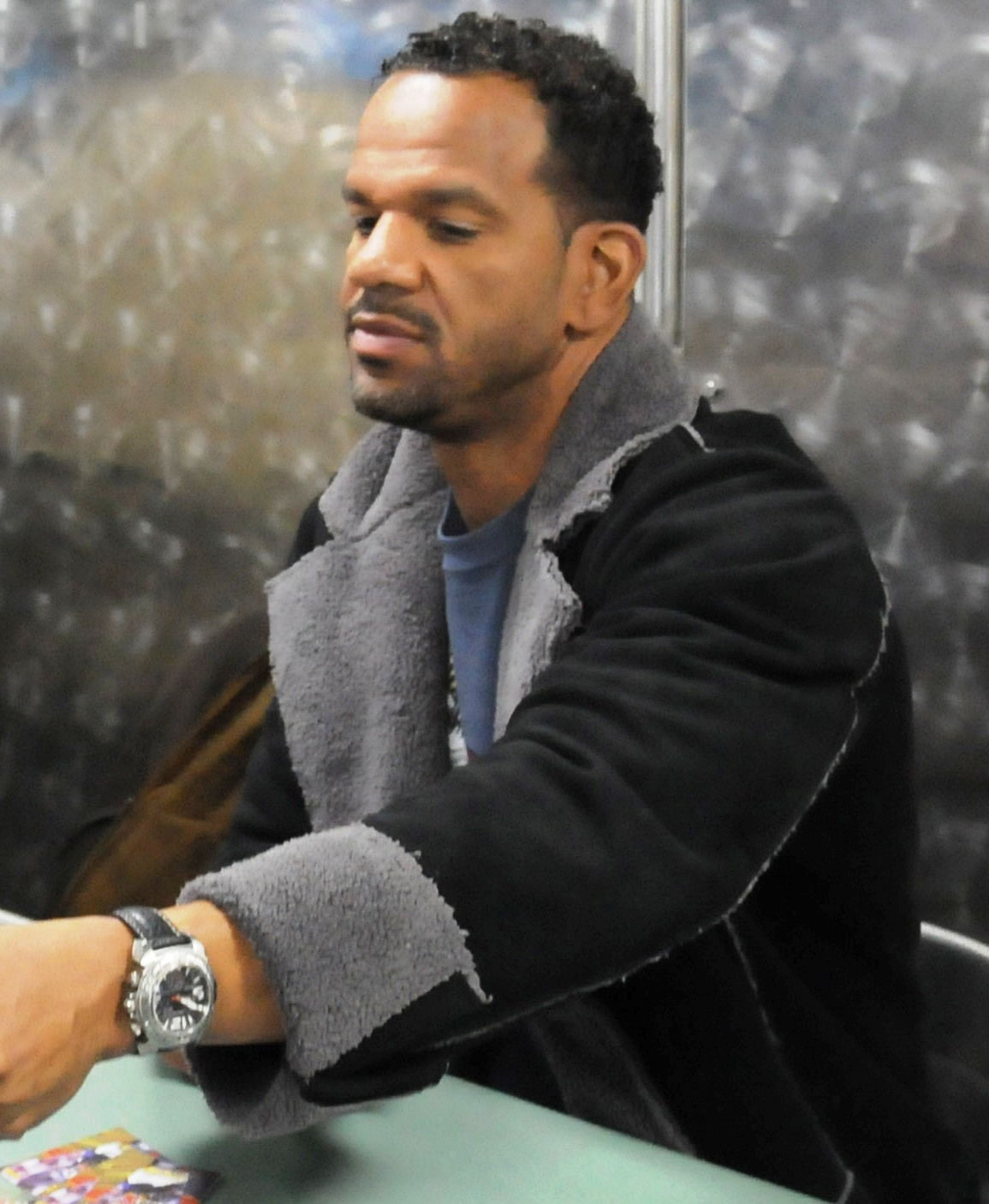
Andre Reed, Pro Football Hall of Fame member

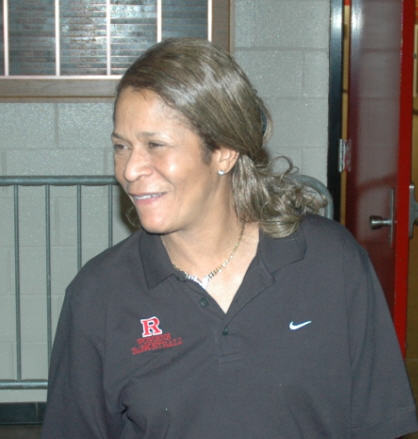
Vivian Stringer

=== Football ===
- Jason Capizzi, Indiana, former Pittsburgh Panthers offensive tackle
- Gene Carpenter, Millersville, former head coach of Millersville
- Curt Cignetti, Indiana, former University of Alabama recruiting coordinator, former James Madison University head coach, current Indiana University head coach
- Frank Cignetti, Jr., Indiana, former University of Pittsburgh offensive coordinator
- Frank Cignetti, Sr., Indiana, former IUP and West Virginia University head coach, 1991 Division II Coach of the Year
- Dominique Curry, California, St. Louis Rams wide receiver
- Rob Davis, Shippensburg, former NFL long snapper, current director of player development for the Green Bay Packers
- Doug Dennison, Kutztown, former NFL running back
- Jahri Evans, Bloomsburg, offensive guard for the New Orleans Saints
- Lawson Fiscus, Indiana, early professional football player
- James Franklin, East Stroudsburg, head coach for the Pennsylvania State University
- David Green, Edinboro, former CFL running back, 1979 CFL's Most Outstanding Player
- Kris Griffin, Indiana, former NFL linebacker
- Brent Grimes, Shippensburg, former NFL cornerback for the Atlanta Falcons
- Bruce Harper, Kutztown, former running back and kick returner for the New York Jets
- Trevor Harris, Edinboro, quarterback for the Ottawa Redblacks
- Jim Haslett, Indiana, former linebacker for the Buffalo Bills and New York Jets and head coach for the New Orleans Saints and St. Louis Rams
- Jack Henry, Indiana, former NFL assistant coach
- Greg Hopkins, Slippery Rock, former Arena Football League player
- Kevin Ingram, West Chester, wide receiver and defensive back for the Los Angeles Avengers
- Mike Jemison, Indiana, former NFL and NFL Europe running back
- Terrence Johnson, California, Indianapolis Colts cornerback
- Derrick Jones, California, Oakland Raiders wide receiver
- Leander Jordan, Indiana, former NFL offensive tackle
- Matt Kinsinger, Slippery Rock, fullback/linebacker for the Chicago Rush
- John Kuhn, Shippensburg, fullback for the Green Bay Packers
- Chuck Klausing, Indiana, College Football Hall of Fame, 1998 Class
- Bob Ligashesky Indiana, Pittsburgh Steelers special teams coach
- LeRon McCoy, Indiana, former NFL wide receiver
- Dewey McDonald, California, safety for the Indianapolis Colts
- Rontez Miles, California, current safety for the New York Jets
- John Mobley, Kutztown, former linebacker for the Denver Broncos
- Kevin O'Dea, Lock Haven, former New York Jets special teams coordinator
- Akwasi Owusu-Ansah, Indiana, firmer Dallas Cowboys wide receiver
- Ken Parrish, East Stroudsburg, former NFL punter
- Josh Portis, California, Seattle Seahawks quarterback
- Dan Radakovich, Indiana, Georgia Tech athletic director
- Andre Reed, Kutztown, Hall of Fame NFL wide receiver for the Buffalo Bills and the Washington Redskins
- Robb Riddick, Millersville, former running back for the Buffalo Bills
- Sean Scott, Millersville, wide receiver/linebacker for the Philadelphia Soul
- Joe Senser, West Chester, former tight end for the Minnesota Vikings
- Ralph Tamm, West Chester, former NFL offensive guard
- Jimmy Terwilliger, East Stroudsburg, quarterback, 2005 Harlon Hill Trophy winner
- Bob Tucker, Bloomsburg, former NFL tight end
- Chris Villarrial, Indiana, former NFL offensive guard
- Andre Waters, Cheyney, former NFL defensive back
- Reggie Wells, Clarion, current NFL free agent, drafted as an offensive tackle for the Arizona Cardinals
- James Williams, Cheyney, former offensive tackle for the Chicago Bears
- Lee Woodall, West Chester, former NFL linebacker
- Dondrea Tillman, Indiana, Denver Broncos linebacker

=== Baseball ===
- Clyde Barnhart, Shippensburg, former World Series-winning outfielder for the Pittsburgh Pirates.
- Tom Brookens, Mansfield, former MLB third baseman
- Mark Corey, Edinboro, former MLB pitcher
- Ryan Vogelsong, Kutztown, MLB pitcher
- Pete Vukovich, Clarion, MLB Pitcher, Cy Young Winner-Brewers
- Matt Adams, Slippery Rock, First Baseman for the St. Louis Cardinals in the MLB.
- Pat Kelly, West Chester, former MLB infielder, New York Yankees
- Joey Wendle, West Chester, MLB Infielder, Tampa Bay Rays
- Dan Altavilla, Mercyhurst, MLB Pitcher, Seattle Mariners
- Lou Trivino, Slippery Rock, MLB Pitcher, Oakland Athletics
- Matt Festa, East Stroudsburg, MLB Pitcher, Seattle Mariners
- Chas McCormick, Millersville, reigning World Series-Champion outfielder for the Houston Astros.
- Tim Mayza, Millersville, MLB Pitcher, Toronto Blue Jays

=== Basketball ===
- Geno Auriemma, West Chester, women's head coach at Connecticut; member of the Naismith Memorial Basketball Hall of Fame and Women's Basketball Hall of Fame
- Del Beshore, California, former NBA point guard
- John Calipari, Clarion, Arkansas men's head coach, 1996 and 2008 Naismith College Coach of the Year, member of the Naismith Hall of Fame
- Stephen Dennis, Kutztown, Division II Player of the Year and professional player
- Mel Hankinson, Indiana, former college basketball coach including Liberty
- Jodi Kest, Slippery Rock, Akron women's basketball head coach
- C. Vivian Stringer, Slippery Rock, women's head coach at Rutgers; member of the Naismith and Women's Halls of Fame

=== Soccer ===
- Nicholas Addlery, California, forward currently for the Puerto Rico Islanders and the Jamaica national team
- Raymond Bernabei, Indiana, National Intercollegiate Soccer Officials Association and National Soccer Hall of Fame
- Jay Hoffman, East Stroudsburg, head coach of the 1999 U.S. women's Pan American Games gold medal team, and assistant coach of the 1999 U.S. FIFA Women's World Cup gold medal team
- Bob Rigby, East Stroudsburg, former goalkeeper in the North American Soccer League and the U.S. national team

=== Olympians ===
- Bekzod Adburakhmonov, Clarion, 2020 Summer Olympics bronze medalist
- Kurt Angle, Clarion, 1996 Summer Olympics wrestling gold medalist
- Steve Spence, Shippensburg, former Olympic long-distance runner
- Cary Kolat, Lock Haven, 2000 Summer Olympics Freestyle Wrestling - 9th
- Stanley Dziedzic, Slippery Rock, 1976 Summer Olympics wrestling bronze medalist

== See also ==
- Pennsylvania Collegiate Athletic Association
