= Pennsylvania State System of Higher Education =

Agency that oversees Pennsylvania-owned colleges and universities

Coordinates: 40.29495°N 76.90436°W

Pennsylvania's State System of Higher Education
- Type: State university system
- Established: July 1, 1983
- Academic affiliations: Keystone Library Network
- Chancellor: Christopher Fiorentino
- Academic staff: 5,500
- Students: 82,688 students (2023)
- Location: Harrisburg, Pennsylvania, United States
- Campus: 10 universities
- Sporting affiliations: NCAA Division II – PSAC
- Website: www.passhe.edu

The Pennsylvania State System of Higher Education (PASSHE) is a state agency of the Commonwealth of Pennsylvania in the United States that oversees 10 state-owned universities. Collectively, it is the largest provider of higher education in the commonwealth. All of the schools are primarily NCAA Division II members and affiliated with the Pennsylvania State Athletic Conference (PSAC).

PASSHE is one of two state-funded university systems in Pennsylvania with the other being the Commonwealth System of Higher Education.

== History ==
The Normal School Act of 1857 was passed on the last day of session on May 20, 1857. Its passage created 12 normal school districts in the state in which to establish private corporations answerable to the State Superintendent of Common Schools. Afterward, the School Code of 1911 mandated that the Commonwealth purchase all the normal schools. The normal schools evolved from state normal schools, to state teacher's colleges, to state colleges. Act 188, which was signed into law on November 12, 1982, and came into effect on July 1, 1983, established the Pennsylvania State System of Higher Education, and converted those state colleges into universities.

=== 2022 consolidations ===
A plan to merge six of the current PASSHE institutions into two multi-campus universities is ongoing as of July 2021. There was opposition to the plan. It has faced opposition by the Lock Haven City Council, the Clinton County Commissioners, the Clear Coalition, the Party for Socialism and Liberation Chester County, PASSHE Defenders, AFSCME Council 13, Pennsylvania AFL–CIO, APSCUF and from public comments. Groups like APSCUF, AFSCME, and the Pennsylvania AFL–CIO held a press conference May 3, 2021, to speak out in opposition to the consolidation. PASSHE Defenders & the Party for Socialism & Liberation Chester County held rallies across the state at the campuses slated for consolidation and at the state capital Harrisburg. The plan being a part of the larger state system redesign was projected to have disastrous effects according to a report out of the Political Economy Research Institute (PERI) of the University of Massachusetts Amherst. The report titled "The Economic Impact of the PASSHE Employment Reductions" outlines "[The] large cuts in staffing, both of faculty and of professional and classified staff in good unionized jobs, constitute the core of the restructuring. The cuts, amounting to 14 percent of overall PASSHE employment, are of a magnitude equivalent to the largest private-sector plant closings and mass layoffs of the previous decade in Pennsylvania."

Under the plan, two sets of three schools would merge into single institutions effective July 1, 2022—Bloomsburg, Lock Haven, and Mansfield in the state's northeast, and California, Clarion, and Edinboro in western Pennsylvania. Each three-school group would have a new name, but the plan called for all institutions involved in these mergers to retain their current campus identities and athletic programs. The PASSHE board of governors approved the plan on April 28, 2021, which opened a 60-day public comment period.

The comment period originally was set to have two public comment hearings throughout the 60-day public comment period as outlined in Act 50, only taking place on June 9 and 10. However after public pressure the Board of Governors announced the addition of two additional hearings the same days. Additionally, APSCUF held their own public comment hearings.

The NCAA would have to approve the continued separation of the athletic programs at the merged institutions. The board voted unanimously to approve the merger on July 14, but a system press release stated that "the efforts to complete the two integrations will take years."

=== Funding ===
Pennsylvania saw an almost 34% cut in state higher education funding from 2008 to 2018. PASSHE over the past two decades has been cut harshly in regards to state funding. In the early 2000s they received over $700 million adjusted to 2022 dollars. However, in the 2021–2022 academic year they received less than $500 million.

== Universities and related entities ==
The system includes ten universities in Pennsylvania:

University	Location	Founded	Enrollment	Endowment	Athletics	
University	Location	Founded	Enrollment	Endowment	Affiliation	Nickname
Cheyney University	Cheyney	1837	618	$1.67 million	Independent	Wolves
Commonwealth University of Pennsylvania	Bloomsburg (Commonwealth University-Bloomsburg)	2022	14,933		NCAA Div II; PSAC	Huskies
Commonwealth University of Pennsylvania	Lock Haven (Commonwealth University-Lock Haven)	2022	14,933		NCAA Div II; PSAC	Bald Eagles
Commonwealth University of Pennsylvania	Mansfield (Commonwealth University-Mansfield)	2022	14,933		NCAA Div II; PSAC	Mounties
East Stroudsburg University	East Stroudsburg	1893	7,234	$22.2 million	NCAA Div II; PSAC	Warriors
Indiana University of Pennsylvania	Indiana	1875	9,794	$60.6 million	NCAA Div II; PSAC	Crimson Hawks
Kutztown University	Kutztown	1866	8,309	$45.7 million	NCAA Div II; PSAC	Golden Bears
Millersville University	Millersville	1855	8,505	$43.9 million	NCAA Div II; PSAC	Marauders
Pennsylvania Western University	California (PennWest California)	2022	14,447		NCAA Div II; PSAC	Vulcans
Pennsylvania Western University	Clarion (PennWest Clarion)	2022	14,447		NCAA Div II; PSAC	Golden Eagles
Pennsylvania Western University	Edinboro (PennWest Edinboro)	2022	14,447		NCAA Div II; PSAC	Fighting Scots
Shippensburg University	Shippensburg	1871	8,253	$36.9 million	NCAA Div II; PSAC	Raiders
Slippery Rock University	Slippery Rock	1889	8,806	$16.5 million	NCAA Div II; PSAC	The Rock
West Chester University	West Chester	1871	17,719	$47.2 million	NCAA Div II; PSAC, ECAC	Golden Rams

=== Consolidations in 2022 ===
Starting in the 2022–2023 academic year, six of the PASSHE campuses were consolidated into two universities.

- Pennsylvania Western University, comprising the former California, Clarion, and Edinboro universities.
- Commonwealth University of Pennsylvania, comprising the former Lock Haven, Bloomsburg, and Mansfield universities. These three institutions, while merged operationally with a common leadership and administrative structure, retain their distinct names and logos and appear as three unrelated universities for branding purposes. However, the three universities were legally merged into a single university under the accreditation of Bloomsburg University, henceforth known as Commonwealth University of Pennsylvania by its accrediting body.

=== Related organizations ===
- Keystone Library Network
- Pennsylvania State Athletic Conference

State System universities also operate four branch campuses. The Office of the Chancellor is situated in the capital city of Harrisburg.

As reported in November 2020, "The Pennsylvania State System of Higher Education was given the green light from the General Assembly to sell the Dixon University Center". The Dixon University Center was then purchased by the Jewish Federation of Greater Harrisburg.

== Mission ==
As established by the founding legislation, Act 188 of 1982, the primary mission of the State System of Higher Education "is the provision of instruction for undergraduate and graduate students to and beyond the Master's degree in the liberal arts and sciences, and in the applied fields, including the teaching profession." Additionally, the purpose of the State System is "to provide high quality education at the lowest possible cost to students."

== Governance ==
A 20-member board of governors oversees the system. Additional power is vested in councils of trustees at the constituent universities.

Board of governors members include: four state legislators, three students, the Governor of the Commonwealth (or a designee), the Pennsylvania Secretary of Education (or a designee), and 11 citizens appointed by the governor and confirmed by the state senate.

The board sets general policy for the system. Its members set recommendations regarding individual university tuition and the university technology fee. They have meetings typically on a quarterly basis.

Act 188 of 1982 states, "Funding for the Board of Governors and chancellor shall come from all operating funds available to the State colleges and State-owned university, but shall not exceed one-half of one per centum (.5%) of such funds. For purposes of this section, the phrase 'operating funds' means any federal appropriation, any state appropriation, any student tuition fees and any student fees for room and board".

Additionally, Act 188 states "The Board of Governors shall provide for the holding of regular and special meetings. Eleven (11) governors attending shall constitute a quorum for the transaction of any business and, unless a greater number is required by the bylaws of the board, the act of a majority of the governors present at any meeting shall be deemed the act of the board. ((b) amended June 23, 1988, P.L.457, No.77)".

== Current enrollment and alumni ==
In the 2025–2026 academic year, more than 83,000 students attend PASSHE institutions.

== Facilities and employees ==
In total the university campuses comprise approximately 4,700 acres (19 km^{2}). A total of 862 buildings with nearly 25 million square feet (2.3 km^{2}) house classrooms, residences, administrative offices, and student support services. The system employs more than 13,700 professional and support staff, most covered by collective bargaining agreements. The various libraries are connected through the cooperative Keystone Library Network.

== See also ==
- List of Pennsylvania state agencies
