= Commonwealth University of Pennsylvania =

Public university in Pennsylvania, United States

Coordinates: 41°00′29.7″N 76°26′42.5″W

- Other name: Commonwealth University
- Former names: Bloomsburg University of Pennsylvania (1983–2022); Lock Haven University of Pennsylvania (1983–2022); Mansfield University of Pennsylvania (1983–2022)
- Type: Public
- Established: July 1, 2022; 4 years ago
- Parent institution: PASSHE
- Accreditation: MSCHE
- President: Jeffrey Osgood
- Provost: Michelle Kiec
- Location: Bloomsburg, Lock Haven, Mansfield, Clearfield, Pennsylvania, United States
- Campus: Multiple
- Campuses: Bloomsburg; Lock Haven; Mansfield; Clearfield
- Campus colors: Bloomsburg: Maroon and Gold; Lock Haven: Crimson and White; Mansfield: Red and Black
- Nicknames: Bloomsburg: Huskies; Lock Haven: Bald Eagles; Mansfield: Mountaineers
- Sporting affiliations: NCAA Division II – PSAC; NCAA Division I – MAC (Wrestling - Bloomsburg and Lock Haven); NCAA Division I – A-10 (Field Hockey - Lock Haven)
- Mascots: Bloomsburg: Roongo; Lock Haven: Talon; Mansfield: The Mountie
- Website: www.commonwealthu.edu

Commonwealth University of Pennsylvania (CU) is a public university in Pennsylvania, United States. It has three campuses in the Pennsylvania boroughs of Bloomsburg, Lock Haven, and Mansfield. The university was created in 2022 by the merger of Bloomsburg University, Lock Haven University, and Mansfield University. Commonwealth University is a part of the Pennsylvania State System of Higher Education (PASSHE) and is accredited by the Middle States Commission on Higher Education.

== History ==
In 2021, the PASSHE Board of Governors voted to consolidate six PASSHE schools into two regional campuses as a way to address declining enrollment and increasing tuition. The two new regional campuses were Pennsylvania Western University and Commonwealth University of Pennsylvania. Bloomsburg University, Lock Haven University, and Mansfield University were consolidated to form Commonwealth University of Pennsylvania. Each of the previous universities became campuses for the new regional institution, and each campus maintained its own mascots. Commonwealth University - Bloomsburg's official colors are Maroon and Gold and their mascot is the Husky. The Lock Haven campus's official colors are crimson and white and the mascot is the Bald Eagle. The Mansfield campus's official colors are red and black and the official mascot is the Mountaineers. Commonwealth University participates in the NCAA Division II Pennsylvania State Athletic Conference.

The first students attending Commonwealth University arrived in August 2022 with all three previous institutions having integrated their curriculum by August 2024.

The inaugural president of Commonwealth University of Pennsylvania was Dr. Bashar W. Hanna. Hanna had been president of Bloomsburg University and was named interim president of Lock Haven and Mansfield Universities upon the announcement of consolidation. Hanna was officially named President of the consolidated institution in July 2022. On April 16, 2026, Jeffery L. Osgood, Jr., Ph.D was named the next president of Commonwealth University. Dr. Osgood has served as interim president since Aug. 1, 2025.

In January 2025, Commonwealth University announced that the Clearfield campus would close by the end of the 2026–27 academic year.

== Academics ==
Undergraduate demographics as of Fall 2023
Race and ethnicity	Total
White	77%
Hispanic	7%
Black	6%
Unknown	5%
Two or more races	3%
Asian	1%
Economic diversity
Low-income (Note: The percentage of students who received an income-based federal Pell grant intended for low-income students.)	34%
Affluent (Note: The percentage of students who are a part of the American middle class at the bare minimum.)	66%

Commonwealth University offers over 80 different undergraduate and graduate programs across its campuses in Bloomsburg, Lock Haven, Mansfield, and Clearfield. Additionally, the availability of each academic program depends on the campus.

In 2024, the in-state tuition cost for undergraduate programs was $7,716, while out-of-state tuition was $19,869. For graduate studies, the tuition cost per credit varies based on the degree type. Tuition is determined by the PASSHE Board of Governors and Commonwealth University Council of Trustees.

== Campuses ==
Campus	Location	Enrollment	Year established	Athletics	
Campus	Location	Enrollment	Year established	Primary conference	Nickname
Commonwealth University-Bloomsburg	Bloomsburg, Pennsylvania	8,000	1839	Pennsylvania (PSAC) (Note: Currently an NCAA Division II athletic conference.)	Huskies
Commonwealth University-Lock Haven	Lock Haven, Pennsylvania	2,900	1870	Pennsylvania (PSAC)	Bald Eagles
Commonwealth University-Mansfield	Mansfield, Pennsylvania	1,800	1857	Pennsylvania (PSAC)	Mounties
