= Fabrisia Ambrosio =

American physical therapist

- Born: Brazil

Academic background
- Education: BSc, biology, 1996, Mansfield University of Pennsylvania; MSc, Physiology-Endocrinology, 1998, Université Laval; MPT, 1999, Medical College of Pennsylvania and Hahnemann University; PhD, rehabilitation science and technology, 2005, University of Pittsburgh
- Thesis: Étude de l'influence contractile et métabolique de l'anhydrase carbonique III dans le muscle soleus et l'extensor digitorum longus de rats hypo- et hyperthyroidiens (1998)

Academic work
- Institutions: University of Pittsburgh, Harvard Medical School
- Main interests: regenerative technologies
- Website: ambrosiolab.pitt.edu

Fabrisia Ambrosio is a Brazilian-born physical therapist and researcher. Dr. Fabrisia Ambrosio currently serves as the Atlantic Charter Director of the Discovery Center for Musculoskeletal Recovery at the Schoen Adams Research Institute. She is also a Professor in the Department of Physical Medicine & Rehabilitation at Harvard Medical School. Previously, she was the Director of Rehabilitation for UPMC International and an associate professor in the Department of Physical Medicine & Rehabilitation at the University of Pittsburgh. In 2022, she was inducted into the American Institute for Medical and Biological Engineering (AIMBE) College of Fellows, “for outstanding contributions to the field of Regenerative Rehabilitation, integrating applied biophysics and cellular therapeutics to optimize tissue function.”

== Early life and education ==
Ambrosio was born and raised in Brazil before moving to Pennsylvania as a teenager when her father became a physics professor at Mansfield University of Pennsylvania. While living in Mansfield, Pennsylvania, she attended Mansfield High School. Upon graduating, Ambrosio completed her Bachelor of Science degree in biology from Mansfield University before moving to Canada for her Master of Science at the Université Laval. She completed her graduate degree in 1998 and returned to Pennsylvania for her Master's in physical therapy from the Medical College of Pennsylvania and Drexel University. Ambrosio finished her formal education with a PhD in Rehabilitation Science and Technology from the University of Pittsburgh where she focused on assistive technologies to assist patients with multiple sclerosis (MS).

== Career ==
Upon completing her PhD, Ambrosio accepted a faculty position in the Department of Physical Medicine & Rehabilitation at the University of Pittsburgh (Pitt). During her early tenure at the institution, Ambrosio continued to focus on how to improve the quality of life for those with MS. In 2007, while working as an investigator at Pitt's Stem Cell Research Center, she released a study showing that those with MS who used motorized chairs had a better quality of life over those who used a manual chair. As an assistant professor, Ambrosio received the 2008 Foundation Research Grant to support her research into stem sells and neuromuscular electrical stimulation. Her research revealed that stem cells were sensitive to electrical stimulation, which could be manipulated to improve the outcomes of transplanting stem cells into dystrophic muscle.

In 2015, Ambrosio served as the senior investigator on a study that researched how arsenic and other environmental contaminants exposures may affect stem cells and their function in adulthood. Using mice, her research team found that chronic exposure to arsenic could lead to stem cell dysfunction that impairs muscle healing and regeneration. Following this, she received two National Institutes of Health awards to study the anti-ageing effect of the protein α-Klotho and dysfunctional muscle remodeling and regeneration in environmental disease. Later that year, in December 2016, Ambrosio was named the Director of Rehabilitation for University of Pittsburgh Medical Center (UPMC) International while maintaining her rank of associate professor in the Department of Physical Medicine & Rehabilitation.

As the Director of Rehabilitation for UPMC International, Ambrosio was the co-recipient of the Aging Cell's Best Paper Prize for 2017 for her co-authored paper "Aging of the skeletal muscle extracellular matrix drives a stem cell fibrogenic conversion." She followed this up with the discovery that α-Klotho had the ability to repair DNA damage in the mitochondria. Based on this discovery, she became the co-principal investigator on a project to investigate the effects of a-Klotho on those with Alzheimer's disease. In the same year, Ambrosio also received the 2020 Life Sciences Award from the Carnegie Science Awards program in recognition of her scientific advances that benefit the economy, health, or societal wellbeing of the region. She was also recognized by Pittsburgh Business Times as a 2021 Women of Influence for her "pioneering research" into regenerative medicine and rehabilitation.

In 2022, Ambrosio was elected a Fellow of the American Institute for Medical and Biological Engineering for "outstanding contributions to the novel field of Regenerative Rehabilitation, integrating applied biophysics and cellular therapeutics to optimize tissue function."

Dr. Ambrosio has been credited with founding a new field: Regenerative Rehabilitation. Regenerative Rehabilitation is defined as “the application of rehabilitation protocols and principles together with regenerative medicine therapeutics toward the goal of optimizing functional recovery through tissue regeneration, remodeling, or repair.” (Rando and Ambrosio, Cell Stem Cell, 2018). She is the lead director of the Alliance for Regenerative Rehabilitation Research & Training (AR3T), which is an NIH-funded center that supports the expansion of scientific knowledge, expertise, and methodologies across the domains of rehabilitation science and regenerative medicine. Dr. Ambrosio is also the Founding Course Director of the Annual International Symposium on Regenerative Rehabilitation and the Founding Director of the International Consortium for Regenerative Rehabilitation, which includes 16 partnering institutions representing North America, Europe, and Asia.

As of 2022, Dr. Fabrisia Ambrosio has served as the Atlantic Charter Director of the Discovery Center for Musculoskeletal Recovery at the Schoen Adams Research Institute. She is also a Professor in the Department of Physical Medicine & Rehabilitation at Harvard Medical School. As Director of the Center, she has conceived the Global Trailblazers of Discovery program, which was carried out in collaboration with Ciência Pioneira, OBMEP (Olimpiada Brasileira de Mathematica Das Escolas Publicas) and IFS (Instituto Federal de Sergipe). The program has the goal of promoting high-quality academic training, development of scientific skills, and expansion of career perspectives for Brazilian students .This mission is personal for Dr. Fabrisia Ambrosio, as the “A^{2}” in the program’s name honors her father, Dr. Antonio Ambrosio, who, as a young physicist at UNICAMP, received a PhD scholarship to study at the University of Notre Dame in the United States, which was an experience that transformed his future and that of his family. Global Trailblazers of Discovery aims to create similar opportunities for individuals who would not otherwise have access, opening doors and giving them the chance to pursue their dreams without limits.

== Personal life ==
Outside of research, Ambrosio and her mother established the Ambrosio Academy, a school that teaches English to disadvantaged children in Brazil. She also served as co-course director of a training course to recruit under-represented minorities and provide a hands-on introduction to research strategies and methods in bioengineering.
