= Kevin O'Dea =

American football player and coach (born 1960)

Personal information
- Born: June 9, 1960 (age 66); Williamsport, Pennsylvania, U.S.

Career information
- College: Lock Haven

Career history
- Lock Haven (1986) Wide receivers coach; Cornell (1987) Defensive backs coach and freshmen coach; Virginia (1988–1990) Graduate assistant; Penn State (1991) Graduate assistant; Penn State (1992–1993) Assistant; San Diego Chargers (1994–1995) Defensive and special teams assistant; Tampa Bay Buccaneers (1996–2001) Offensive and defensive assistant; Detroit Lions (2002–2003) Special teams assistant; Arizona Cardinals (2004–2005) Special teams assistant; Chicago Bears (2006–2007) Assistant special teams coach; New York Jets (2008–2009) Special teams coordinator; Hartford Colonials (2010) Special teams coordinator; Chicago Bears (2011–2012) Assistant special teams coach; Kansas City Chiefs (2013) Assistant special teams coach; Tampa Bay Buccaneers (2014–2015) Special teams coordinator; New Orleans Saints (2016–2018) Assistant special teams coach; New York Jets (2025–present) Assistant special teams coach

Kevin O'Dea (born June 9, 1960) is an American football coach who currently serves as an assistant special teams coach for the New York Jets of the National Football League (NFL).

== College career ==
O'Dea played wide receiver and defensive back from 1984 to 1985 at Lock Haven University.

== Coaching career ==
O'Dea was the assistant special teams coach for the Chicago Bears from February 14, 2006, until he was hired by the New York Jets. O'Dea was named the Jets Special Teams Coordinator on February 20, 2008 after former coordinator Mike Westhoff stepped down after seven years for medical reasons.

On February 11, 2025, the New York Jets hired O'Dea to serve as an assistant special teams coach.

== Personal life ==
A native of State College, Pennsylvania, O'Dea spent a four-year term in the Coast Guard before enrolling at Lock Haven University. O'Dea later obtained a master's degree in education from the University of Virginia.
