= Commonwealth University-Mansfield =

Public university in Mansfield, Pennsylvania, US

Coordinates: 41.8068°N 77.0708°W

- Former names: Mansfield Classical Seminary (1857–1862); Mansfield Normal School (1862–1927); Mansfield State Teachers College (1927–1960); Mansfield State College (1960–1983); Mansfield University of Pennsylvania (1983–2022)
- Motto: Character, Scholarship, Culture, Service
- Type: Public university campus
- Established: 1857; 169 years ago
- Academic affiliations: PASSHE
- President: Jeffery L. Osgood, Jr.
- Students: 1,013 (Fall 2026)
- Location: Mansfield, Pennsylvania, United States
- Campus: Rural
- Colors: Red and black
- Nickname: Mountaineers
- Sporting affiliations: NCAA Division II – PSAC; Collegiate Sprint Football League
- Mascot: The Mountie
- Website: www.mansfield.edu

Commonwealth University-Mansfield (CU-Mansfield, or Mansfield) is a campus of Commonwealth University of Pennsylvania, and is located in Mansfield, Pennsylvania, United States. It is part of the Pennsylvania State System of Higher Education (PASSHE). As of 2026, the campus's total enrollment is 1,335 students. On November 17, 2026, it was announced by University President Jeffrey Osgood that the Chancellor's Office had ordered that the university would be closing "no later than June 30, 2028."

== History ==
Before Mansfield University, "Mansfield Classical Seminary" opened on January 7, 1857. At 10:00 a.m. on April 22, with a foot of snow on the ground, the Mansfield Classical Seminary burned to the ground. Immediately after the fire, the founders vowed to persevere and reconstruct an even bigger and better building. Mansfield Classical Seminary was rebuilt and reopened on November 23, 1859, to some 30 students. The Rev. James Landreth was elected principal and Julia A. Hosmer was named preceptress.

In 1862, Simon B. Elliott submitted application for Mansfield Classical Seminary to become a state normal school. The application was accepted in December 1862, and Mansfield Classical Seminary became the "Mansfield Normal School", the third state normal school in Pennsylvania. In 1874, the new ladies' dormitory was built for a cost of $15,000. It was later renamed North Hall.

In 1892 at the Great Mansfield Fair, electric lights were erected and a game of football was played between Mansfield Normal and Wyoming Seminary, ending in a draw. It was later recorded as the first night football game played in the United States.

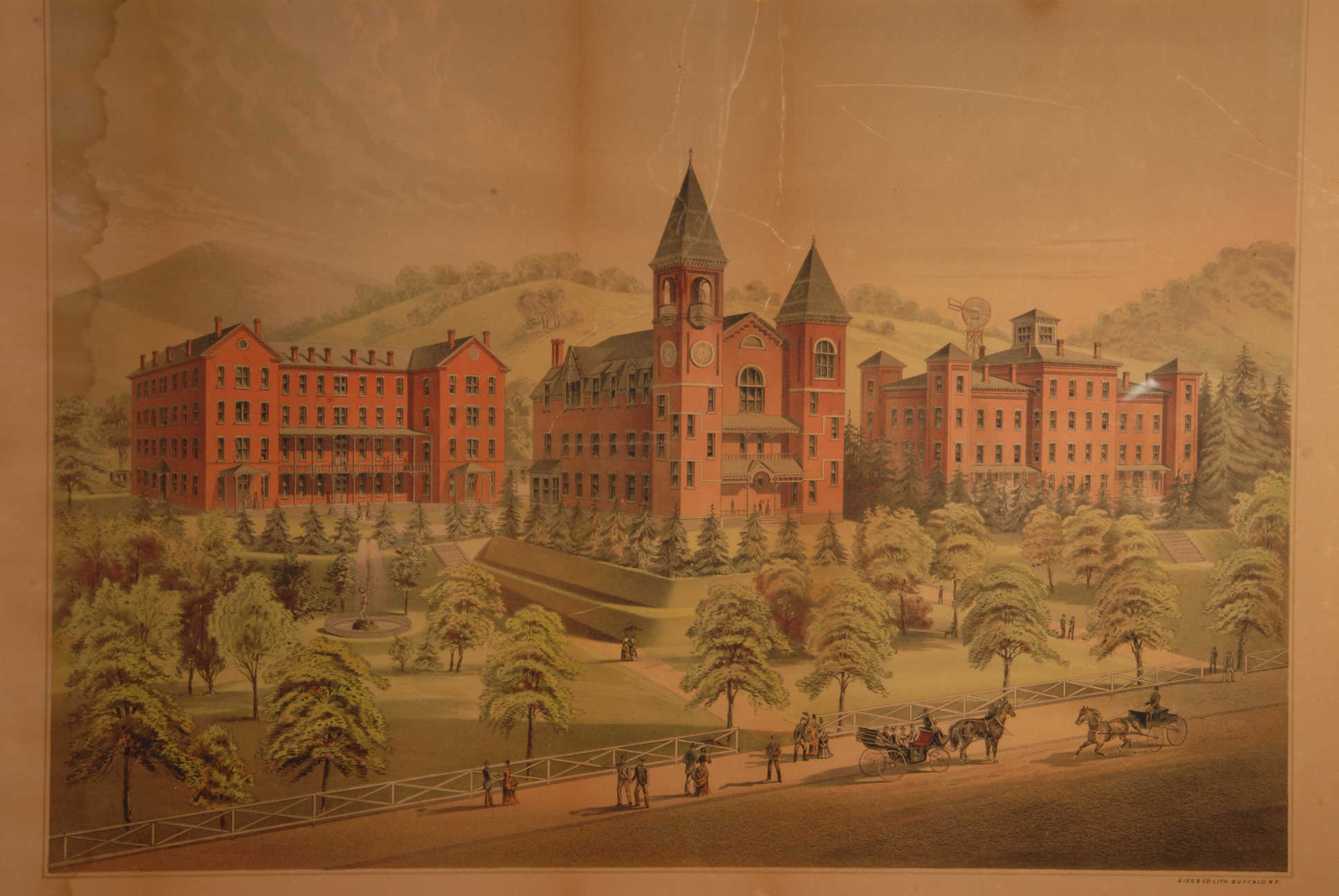
Postcard of Mansfield Normal School in the 1890s

In 1902, Mansfield Normal School moved to a three-year program from the two-year normal course, pushing the school closer to collegiate status. On June 4, 1926, Mansfield State Normal School was granted the right to give four-year collegiate degrees. Finally, on May 13, 1927, the name Mansfield Normal was officially changed to "Mansfield State Teachers College" ('MSTC').

During World War II, several hundred male students entered military service, and nurse training was initiated at MSTC. Most of the sports were suspended at the college for the duration of the war. Post-war, sports resumed with MSTC capturing two consecutive state championships in football for the 1946 and 1947 seasons. During the 1950s, both South Hall and Alumni Hall were replaced with new buildings.

In 1960, the Pennsylvania Department of Education granted the expansion of liberal arts programs to colleges in the system, including MSTC. MSTC became "Mansfield State College". The campus continued to expand with the construction of other new buildings and new academic programs through the 1960s and 1970s.

In July 2021, Pennsylvania higher education officials announced that Mansfield would merge with Bloomsburg University and Lock Haven University in response to financial difficulties and declining enrollment, and each institution would represent a campus of a single university. In March 2022, the new institution was created to oversee the three campuses and was named the Commonwealth University of Pennsylvania.

In November 2026, the Pennsylvania State System of Higher Education announced plans to close the campus by June of 2028. The plans cited a 71.6% decline in enrollment since 2009 and a $7.7 million deficit following the 2025-2026 school year, and their passing is subject to approval by the board of governors

== Campus ==
On its 175-acre (0.71 km^{2}) campus, Mansfield has four residence halls, multiple eateries, an on-campus student health clinic, campus police unit, campus bookstore, an on-campus and student-led television studio, radio station, an Olympic-sized swimming pool, and campus newspaper. Notable buildings include North Hall Library, Grant Science Planetarium, Decker Gymnasium, Kelchner Fitness Center, multiple outdoor recreation spots (ropes course, disc golf, and biking trails), Straughn Hall Auditorium, Steadman Theatre and Steadman Studios, Alumni Student Center and Game Room, Childcare Center (affiliate), in addition to several academic and administrative buildings and outdoor seating and learning venues.

=== North Hall Library ===
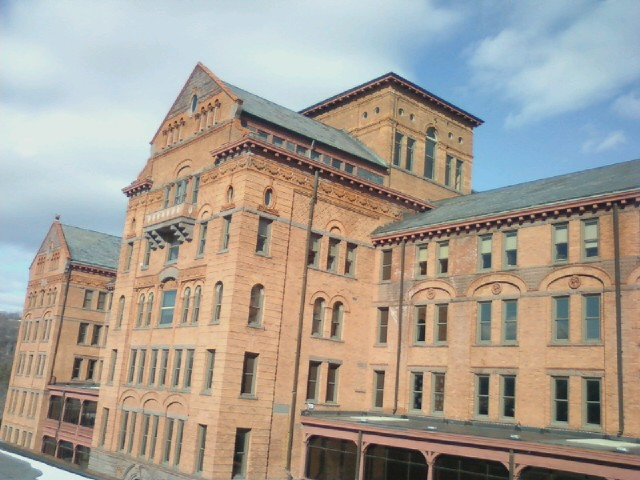
North Hall Library, February 2010

North Hall, a four-story Victorian structure, was completed in 1878. The current visible North Hall was actually built in two parts. The original North Hall from 1874 was torn down in the spring of 1907. The north part (left side) and the middle section was started in the summer of 1891 immediately following the purchase of the lot that the North end cross wing sits on. This new structure was seven stories tall. The new cafeteria on the first floor was opened for use on Thanksgiving Day 1892. Until 1907, the original North Hall, minus the northernmost cross wing part, was up against the newer middle section (south side), and was only four stories tall. In mid-1907 the matching south end of the current North Hall was started. This was completed in 1909. For years, the upper floors served as a women's dormitory while the ground floor was used as the cafeteria. As the university grew and other buildings on the campus were built, North Hall severely deteriorated.

The building was closed in 1976, and the building was almost demolished. However, pressure from campus and community leaders salvaged North Hall. $11 million was used to restore the building through state and private funding. In 1996 North Hall reopened as a library, providing state-of-the-art technology.

The first floor of the library comprises several private listening rooms, complete with a variety of audio equipment and a theater-viewing room with 25 seats. The first floor also holds the Music Library, the library's collection of media, and the Education Library. The second floor hosts the Reference Collection, the Best-Seller Collection, Circulation Desk, Reception Room, and covered porches with over-stuffed wicker furniture.

The third floor hosts the Periodical Collection and the Microfilm Room and Newspaper Reading Room. The fourth floor features private study rooms. The book stacks are located on the third and fourth floor. The library houses an abundance of desks, seating, and technology throughout.

== Academics ==
Mansfield University offers 87 major and minor programs. The university offers associate's, bachelor's, and master's degree programs. The university is accredited by the Middle States Commission on Higher Education.

== Athletics ==
The Mansfield University Mountaineers intercollegiate athletics are members of the National Collegiate Athletic Association (NCAA) Division II and compete in the Pennsylvania State Athletic Conference (PSAC). The sprint football team competes in the Collegiate Sprint Football League.

Women's varsity programs include soccer, field hockey, basketball, cross country, softball, indoor track, and track and field. Men's programs include cross country, basketball, baseball, indoor track, track and field, and sprint football.

== Notable alumni ==
=== Politicians ===
- William D.B. Ainey (1864–1932), U.S. congressman from Pennsylvania (1911–1915)
- Chee Soon Juan, Singaporean opposition politician
- Kenyatta Johnson, Philadelphia City Council member (2012–present)
- Edwin J. Jorden (1863–1903) U.S. congressman from Pennsylvania (1895)
- Kenneth B. Lee (1922–2010), former Speaker of the Pennsylvania House of Representatives
- Fred Churchill Leonard (1856–1921) U.S. congressman from Pennsylvania (1895–1897)
- William A. Stone (1846–1920), Pennsylvania governor (1899–1903)

=== Sports ===
- Tom Brookens, former Major League Baseball player
- Mike Gazella, former Major League Baseball player
- Hughie Jennings, former Major League Baseball player
- Assaf Lowengart (born 1998), baseball player on Team Israel
- Joe Shaute, former Major League Baseball player
- Al Todd, former Major League Baseball player

=== Various ===
- Fabrisia Ambrosio, physical therapist and researcher
- Mary Alderson Chandler Atherton, educator and textbook author
- Georgia Beers, author, Lambda Literary Award winner
- Mark D. McCormack, US Army major general
- Wyatt McLaughlin, guitarist and founder of band The Last Ten Seconds of Life
- Ali Soufan, author, anti-terror FBI agent
- Ray T. Stull, ceramic engineer and professor at the University of Illinois

== Notable faculty ==
- George S. Howard, music 1937–1940
