= Commonwealth University-Bloomsburg =

Public university in Bloomsburg, Pennsylvania, U.S.

Coordinates: 41.008°N 76.448°W

- Former names: Bloomsburg Academy (1839–1856); Bloomsburg Literary Institute (1856–1869); Bloomsburg Literary Institute and State Normal School (1869–1916); Bloomsburg State Normal School (1916–1927); Bloomsburg State Teachers College (1927–1960); Bloomsburg State College (1960–1983); Bloomsburg University of Pennsylvania (1983–2022)
- Type: Public
- Established: 1839; 187 years ago
- Academic affiliations: PASSHE
- Endowment: $73 million (2025)
- President: Bashar W. Hanna
- Students: 7,207
- Location: Bloomsburg, Pennsylvania, U.S.
- Campus: Rural, 366 acres
- Colors: Maroon and gold
- Nickname: Huskies
- Sporting affiliations: NCAA Division II – PSAC
- Mascot: Roongo
- Website: www.bloomu.edu

Commonwealth University-Bloomsburg (CU-Bloomsburg, or Bloomsburg) is a campus of Commonwealth University of Pennsylvania in Bloomsburg, Pennsylvania, United States. It is part of the Pennsylvania State System of Higher Education (PASSHE). The campus is accredited by the Middle States Commission on Higher Education with some degree programs accredited by specialized accreditors.

== History ==
It was established as Bloomsburg Academy in 1839. In 1856, it was renamed Bloomsburg Literary Institute. The name became Bloomsburg Literary Institute and State Normal School in 1869. In 1916, the state of Pennsylvania took control and named it Bloomsburg State Normal School. The name was changed to Bloomsburg State Teachers College in 1927. In 1960, the name was changed to Bloomsburg State College. The name was changed to Bloomsburg University of Pennsylvania on July 1, 1983.

Bloomsburg terminated its Greek Life program on May 13, 2021.

In July 2021, Pennsylvania higher education officials announced that Bloomsburg would merge with Mansfield University and Lock Haven University in response to financial difficulties and declining enrollment, and each institution would represent a campus of a single university. In March 2022, the new institution was created to oversee the three campuses, and was named the Commonwealth University of Pennsylvania.

== Campus ==
Some land of Bloomsburg University extends into Scott Township.

== Academics ==
In 2022-23, Bloomsburg University showed enrollment of 6,804 undergraduate and 636 graduate students.

In 2019–2020, the university employed approximately 521 faculty. The student-to-faculty ratio was roughly 17:1 with 96% of its faculty holding terminal degrees in their field.
