= Commonwealth University-Lock Haven =

Public university in Lock Haven, Pennsylvania, U.S.

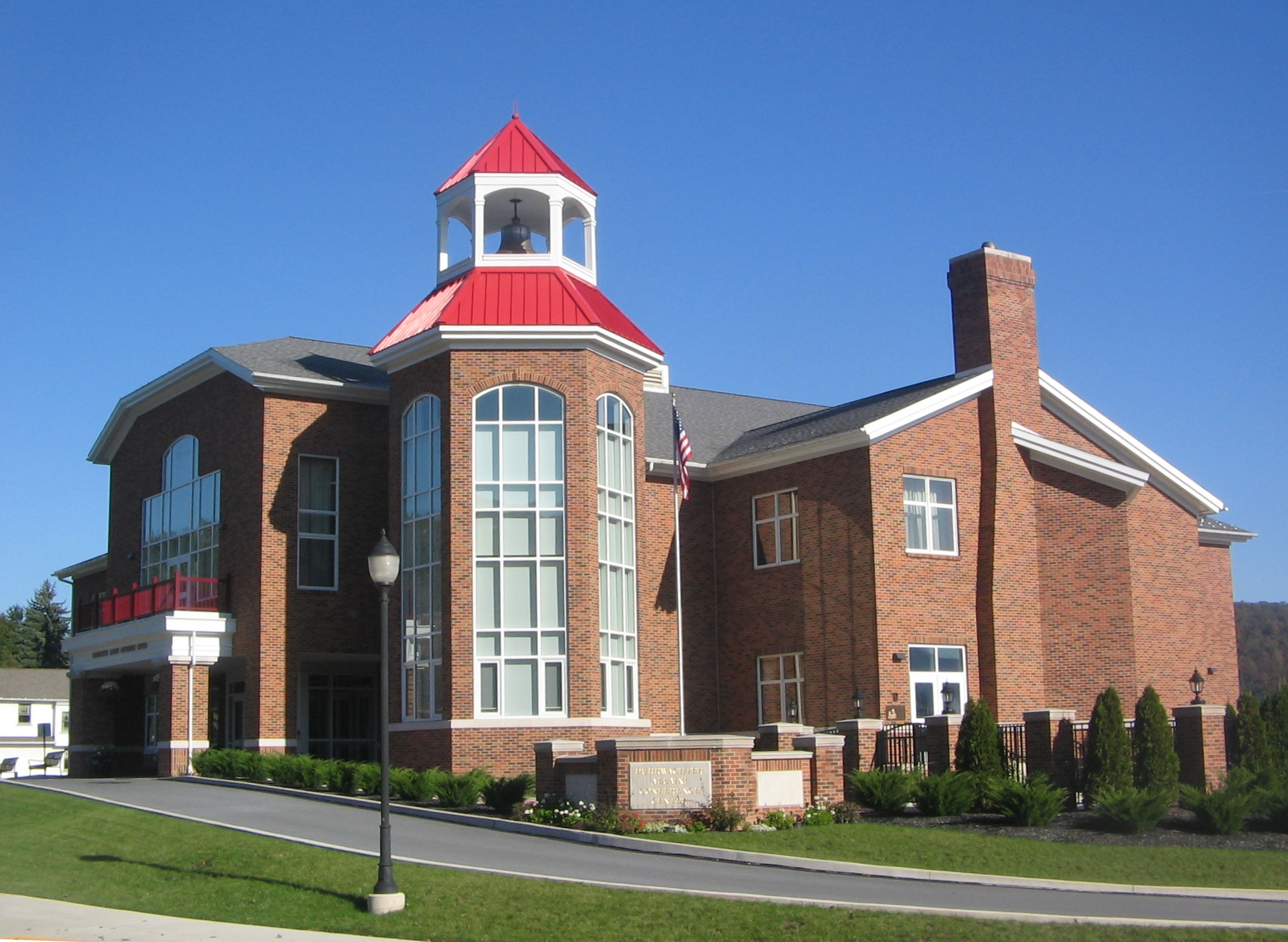
- Durrwachter Alumni Conference Center
- Former names: Central State Normal School (1870–1927); State Teachers College in Lock Haven (1927–1960); Lock Haven State College (1960–1983); Lock Haven University of Pennsylvania (1983–2022)
- Type: Public university
- Established: 1870; 156 years ago
- Parent institution: PASSHE
- Endowment: $18.55 million (2025)
- President: Jeffery Osgood (Interim)
- Provost: Michelle Kiec
- Faculty: 286
- Students: 2,524
- Location: Lock Haven, Pennsylvania, U.S. 41°08′28″N 77°27′40″W
- Colors: Crimson and white
- Nickname: Bald Eagles
- Sporting affiliations: NCAA Division II – PSAC
- Mascot: Talon the Bald Eagle
- Website: commonwealthu.edu/lock-haven

Commonwealth University-Lock Haven (CU-Lock Haven, or Lock Haven) is a public university in Lock Haven, Pennsylvania, United States. It is part of the Pennsylvania State System of Higher Education (PASSHE). The main campus covers 200 acres (81 ha) and the branch campus in Clearfield covers 12.9 acres (5.2 ha). It offers 69 undergraduate programs and 4 graduate programs.

== History ==
LHU was founded in 1870 as the Central State Normal School. By 1927 it was known as the State Teachers College in Lock Haven and in 1960 the name was changed to Lock Haven State College. In 1983, the school joined the Pennsylvania State System of Higher Education (PASSHE) and became known as Lock Haven University of Pennsylvania. The Clearfield campus in Clearfield, Pennsylvania was established in 1989.

LHU's previous president Craig Dean Willis retired from Lock Haven in 2004. The vacancy left by Willis was promptly filled by Keith T. Miller. Upon Miller's departure, Barbara Dixon, former president of Truman State University was appointed Interim President in 2010. In 2011, Michael Fiorentino, Jr. became the president, until his retirement in 2018. The last president of Lock Haven University was Robert Pignatello.

In July 2021, Pennsylvania higher education officials announced that Lock Haven would merge with Bloomsburg and Mansfield Universities in response to financial difficulties and declining enrollment, and each institution would represent a campus of a single university. In March 2022, the new institution was created to oversee the three universities, and was named the Commonwealth University of Pennsylvania. This consolidation was different from the PASSHE consolidation in Western Pennsylvania that also took place in July 2022, which saw the former California, Clarion, and Edinboro universities become campuses of the new Pennsylvania Western University and adopt the academic brand name of "PennWest Location". By contrast, "Commonwealth University" is not being used as a public-facing brand.

In January 2025, Commonwealth University announced that the Clearfield campus would close by the end of the 2026–27 academic year.

== Campus ==
The campus covers 200 acres (81 ha) on the western side of the city of Lock Haven. The university owns another 12.9 acres (5.2 ha) at the CU-Clearfield campus and 44 acres (18 ha) at the Sieg Conference Center. University property also includes a new East Campus in the former Lock Haven High School building.

=== Residence halls ===
CU-Lock Haven has 2 traditional residence halls, one hall of suites, and one apartment building complex.
* = Halls that are scheduled to be demolished.

Hall name	High Hall*	McEntire Hall*	North Hall*	Smith Hall	Woolridge Hall	Fairview Suites	Campus Village
Completed in	1970	1969	1967	1958	1959	2012	1991
Number of students housed	203	400	208	248	205	684	170

=== Academic buildings ===
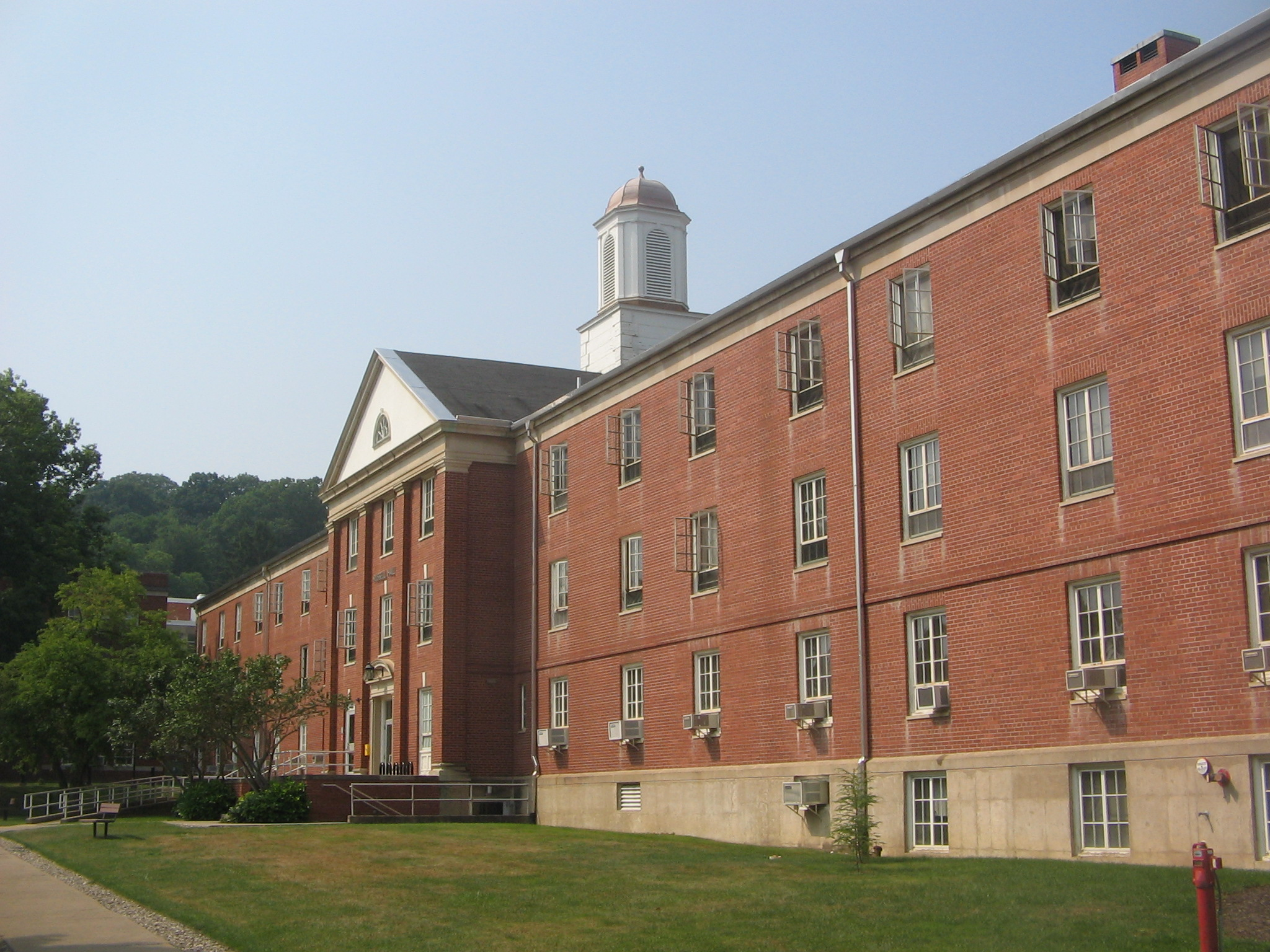
Russell Hall

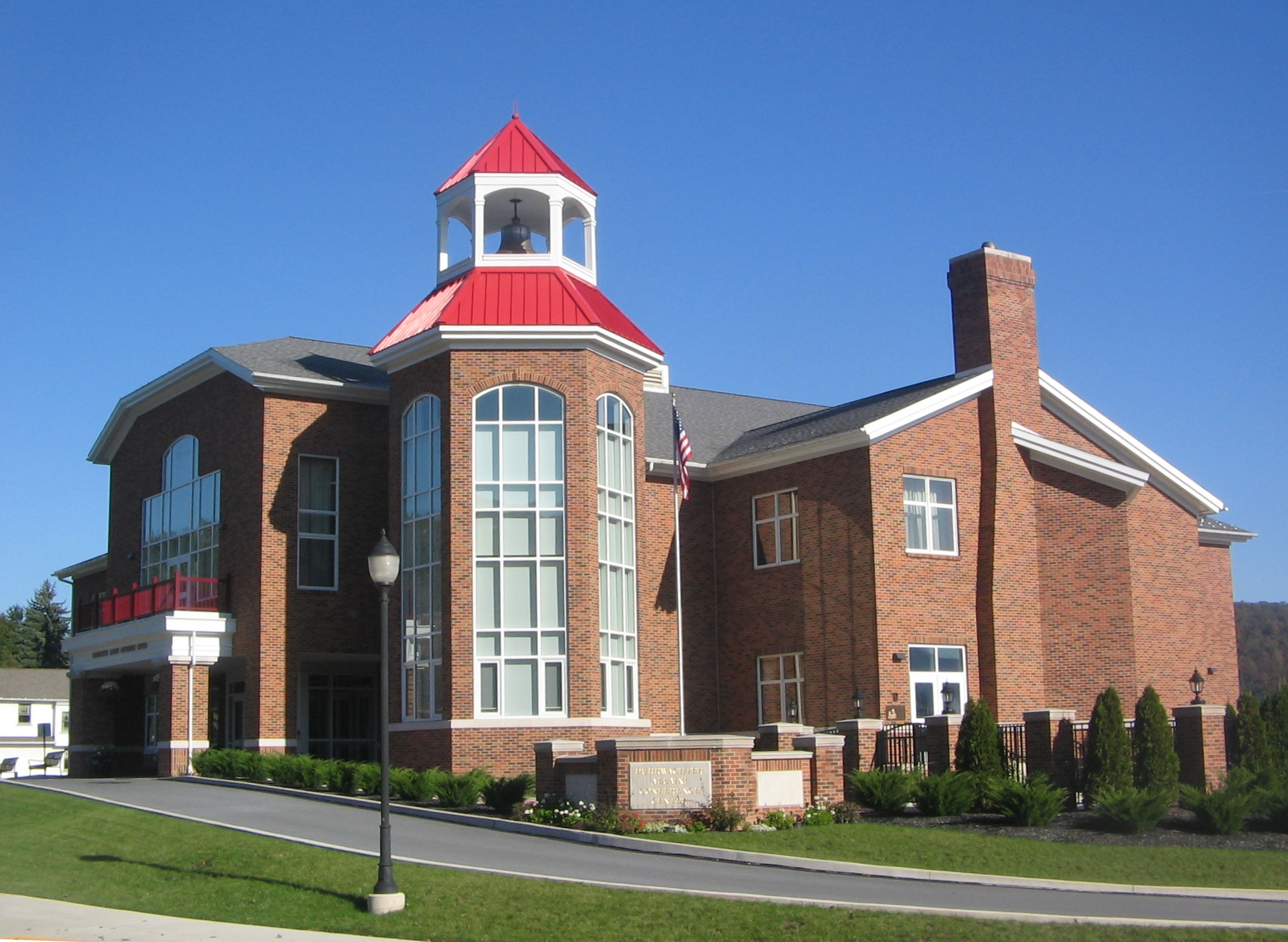
Durwachter Alumni Conference Center

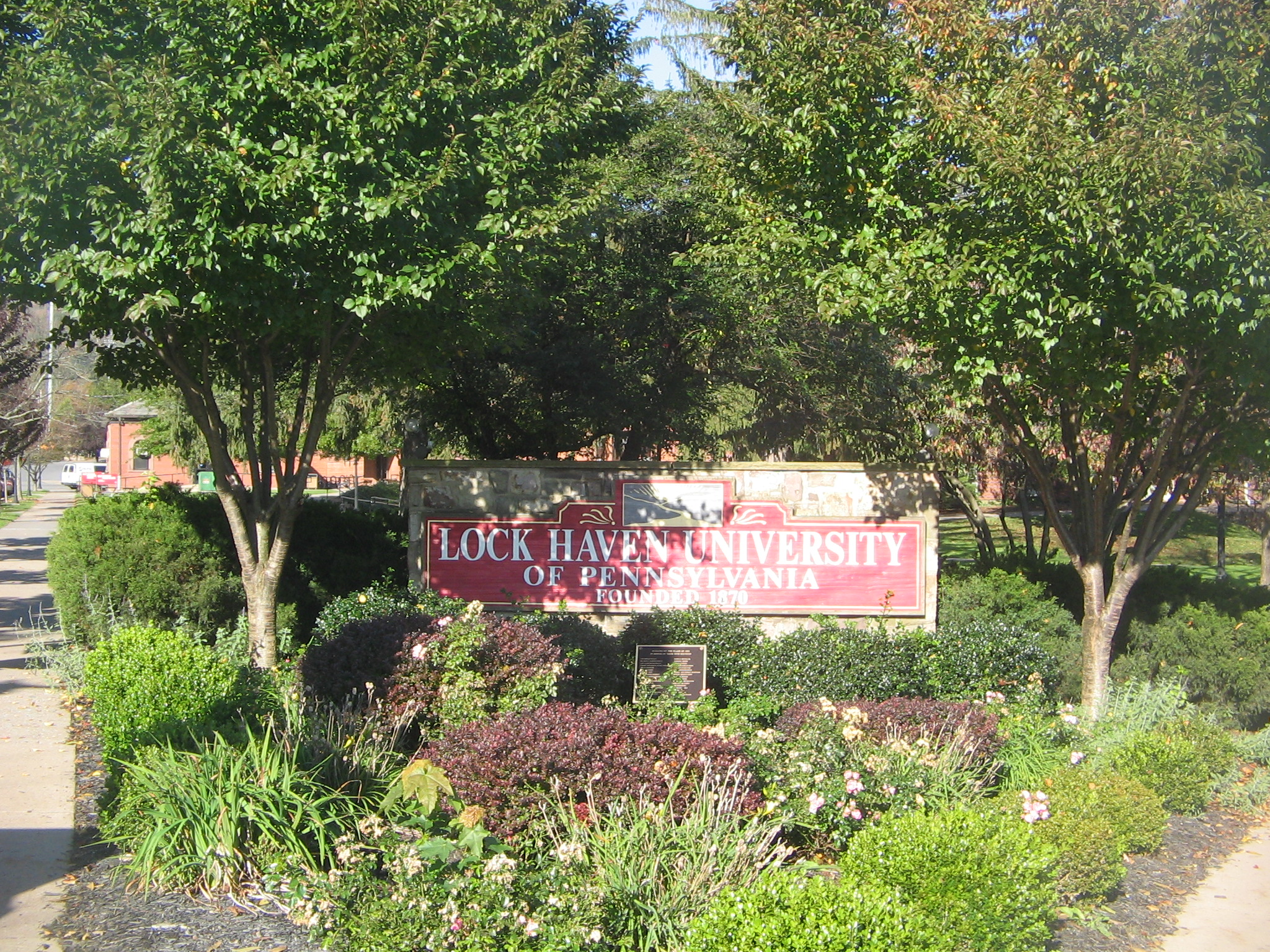
Lock Haven University sign

Akeley Hall, completed in 1930, is one of the oldest buildings on campus. It was originally constructed as a laboratory school but now houses the Computer Science, Accounting and Management Department as well as many computer labs.

Sullivan Hall was originally constructed as a library in 1938, and was demolished in 2016 and replaced with an amphitheater. The three-story structure housed The Office of the President, Offices for the Vice President for Academic Affairs and Provost, Vice President of Student Affairs, and the Vice President for Finance, Administration, and Technology, Housing, Social Equity, Cultural Diversity, Institutional Research, and Planning and Assessment and The Linda J. Emanuel Teaching and Learning Center.

The main building of Ulmer Hall, renovated in 1996, was constructed in 1952 and contains laboratories for the natural and earth sciences and classrooms. A building addition in 1969 added a greenhouse, planetarium, additional classrooms, laboratories and research facilities. A four-million dollar renovation was completed in 2014 to transfer many services to the building such as the ROTC program, the Registrar's Office and Financial Aid, as well as Counseling Services. Ulmer Hall also houses the executive suite which includes the Office of the President, the Office of the Provost, and the Office of the Vice President for Enrollment Management.

Russell Hall was originally constructed as a residence hall and was the last single-sex residence hall on campus, housing women only until it was renovated to house administrative offices. It has been recently demolished and replaced by a green space which is part of the University Commons encompassing the space that previously also included Sullivan Hall. Raub Hall was completed in 1964.

Sloan Fine Arts Center, completed in 1973, contains classrooms, faculty offices, both a small and large theatre for student and professional performances and lectures, and a gallery which hosts six exhibitions throughout the year. The Departments of Fine Arts, the Department of communications, and Performing Arts are located here. The theatre hosts a number of performances that are open to both the student body and community. Room 321 is home to the Countdown Theater. Here student directed one-act plays and other short performances expand the role of the theater department and provide students with additional learning experiences.

Robinson Hall, completed in 1981. This building houses the Departments of Early Childhood, Elementary, Secondary and Special Education, Psychology, Mathematics, Communications Media and Philosophy. Other features include the Hamblin International Hall of Flags Auditorium, a full production television studio and radio station, a Math Lab and tutoring center devoted to remediation and placement testing, and classrooms. The building also provides housing for the information technology services, including a student-run tech department. The building is scheduled to undergo a major renovation in 2021 following a comprehensive review of facilities usage.

Durrwachter Alumni Conference Center, completed in 2007, houses the Offices of Admissions, University Relations and Alumni Relations. The Foundation offices are also located in the Durrwachter Center. This area coordinates and manages philanthropic activities that support the university. Alumni Relations provides programs and services for over 30,000 graduates.

==== East Campus Science Center ====
In 2004 Lock Haven acquired the old Lock Haven High School, which was no longer used due to the creation of Central Mountain High School. This consisted of the junior high school, senior high school, and the gym building. In April 2010, Lock Haven unveiled its plans to build a 40 million dollar new science center where the old senior high school was located. In October 2010, Governor Rendell signed a bill that gave 4 million dollars in funding. Official groundbreaking did not occur until May 4, 2012, this marked the beginning of demolition of the senior high school and construction of the science center. The new science center officially opened for the Fall 2013 semester. It has expanded labs for all science majors other than computer science, and includes a new class 100000 clean room facility for the rapidly expanded Nanotechnology program, allowing the university to rely less on Penn State's clean rooms. Nanotechnology research facilities include characterization and synthesis instrumentation. The ribbon cutting ceremony took place on September 12, 2013, and a cornerstone capsule was opened which contained a list of the senior high school staff, the graduates, and a newspaper from 1928. The previous Junior High School section of the facility now houses the University Controller's office, the Criminal Justice academic department, and several classrooms and labs. The previous gymnasium building houses several classrooms, the Haven Cupboard/Haven Hangout, and a large gymnasium used for athletic practices and special events. Plans exist for the gymnasium and supporting space within the building to be constructed into a Wrestling Center showcasing the strong Division I wrestling program, and a $1 million redevelopment capital grant has been approved by the Pennsylvania Governor's office to support that effort.

=== Stevenson Library ===
Lock Haven University and its library began in 1870 as the Central State Normal School. All classrooms, dormitories, the dining room, the library, and the auxiliary rooms were housed in the original Sullivan Hall, located approximately where North Hall stands. During the night of December 9, 1888, the entire structure burned to the ground. For the next 16 years, the library needs were met by reading rooms provided by two campus literary societies, The Price Literary Society and the Shakespeare Society.

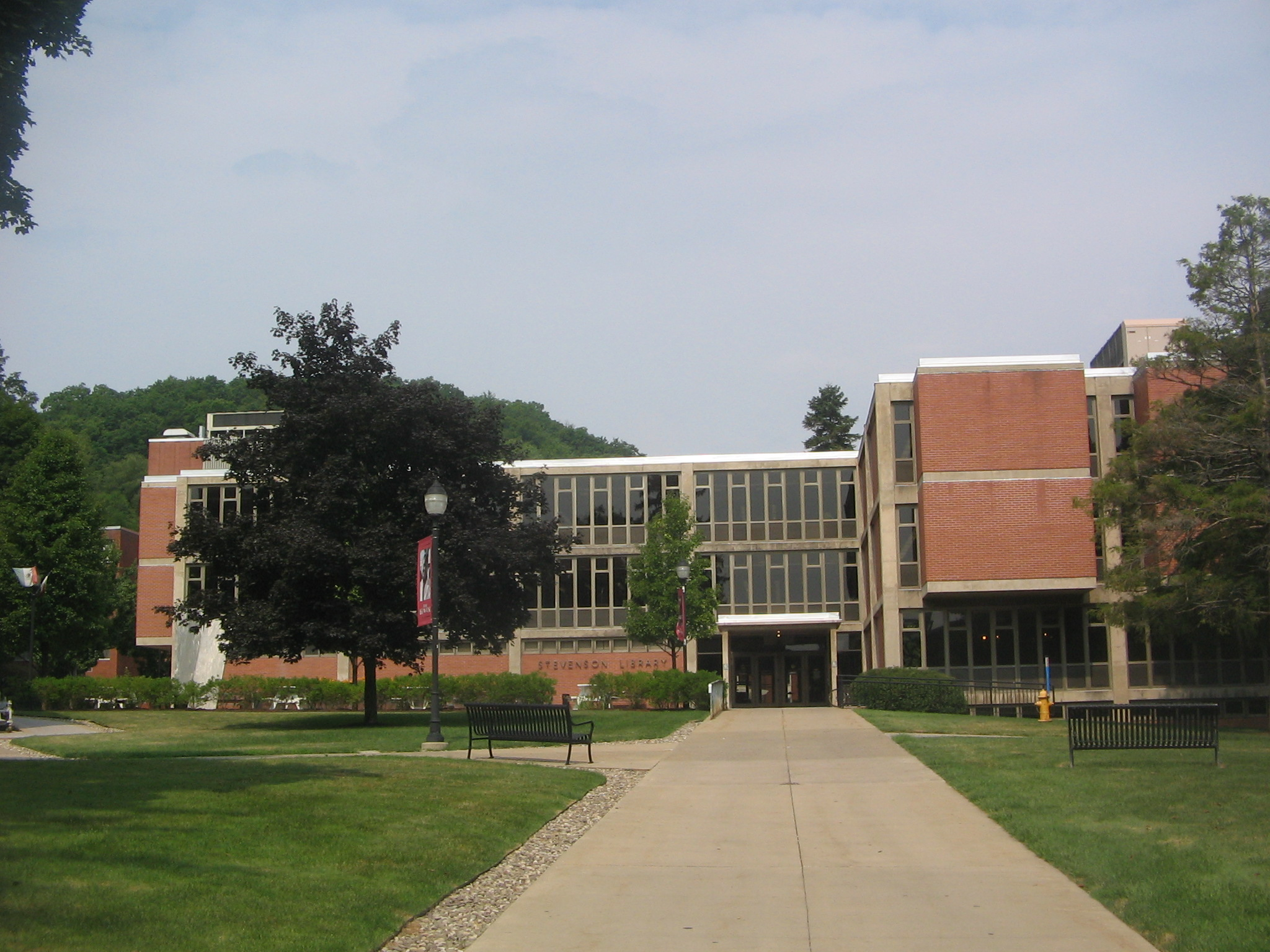
The main entrance to Stevenson Library

In 1904, the library was reorganized. Caroline R. Flickinger was the first librarian. Since that time there has been a steady growth in the number and type of library materials and services. This growth has taken the library through two previous buildings into this structure. The present building was designed to be flexible enough to provide for current needs and to allow future development. Currently, an online public access catalog and an automated circulation system are in place. This online catalog is available on the campus network.

The library is named for a citizen of Lock Haven, George B. Stevenson (1889–1965). He served for many years as a Pennsylvania State Senator. After he retired, he was appointed the librarian of the state senate. Stevenson also served as a mayor of Lock Haven, as postmaster, and as a trustee of the university. The system of dams on the West Branch valley of the Susquehanna River was a concept of Senator Stevenson.

Stevenson Library is the university's library. Its archive collection includes every student newspaper (The Eagle Eye) since 1965, as well as every yearbook (The Praeco) since 1913 until it was discontinued in 1980; and was reinstated in 2006. The archive collection also provides the university with rare books and photographs. The library offers internet database services that gives the university access to full text magazine and newspaper articles, DVDs, books, and an array of information. The Children's Library on the ground floor of the building contains over 20,000 children's books. Stevenson also offers reference services, wireless internet, computer access, and a 24-hour study lounge.

=== Fredericks Family Memorial Carillon ===
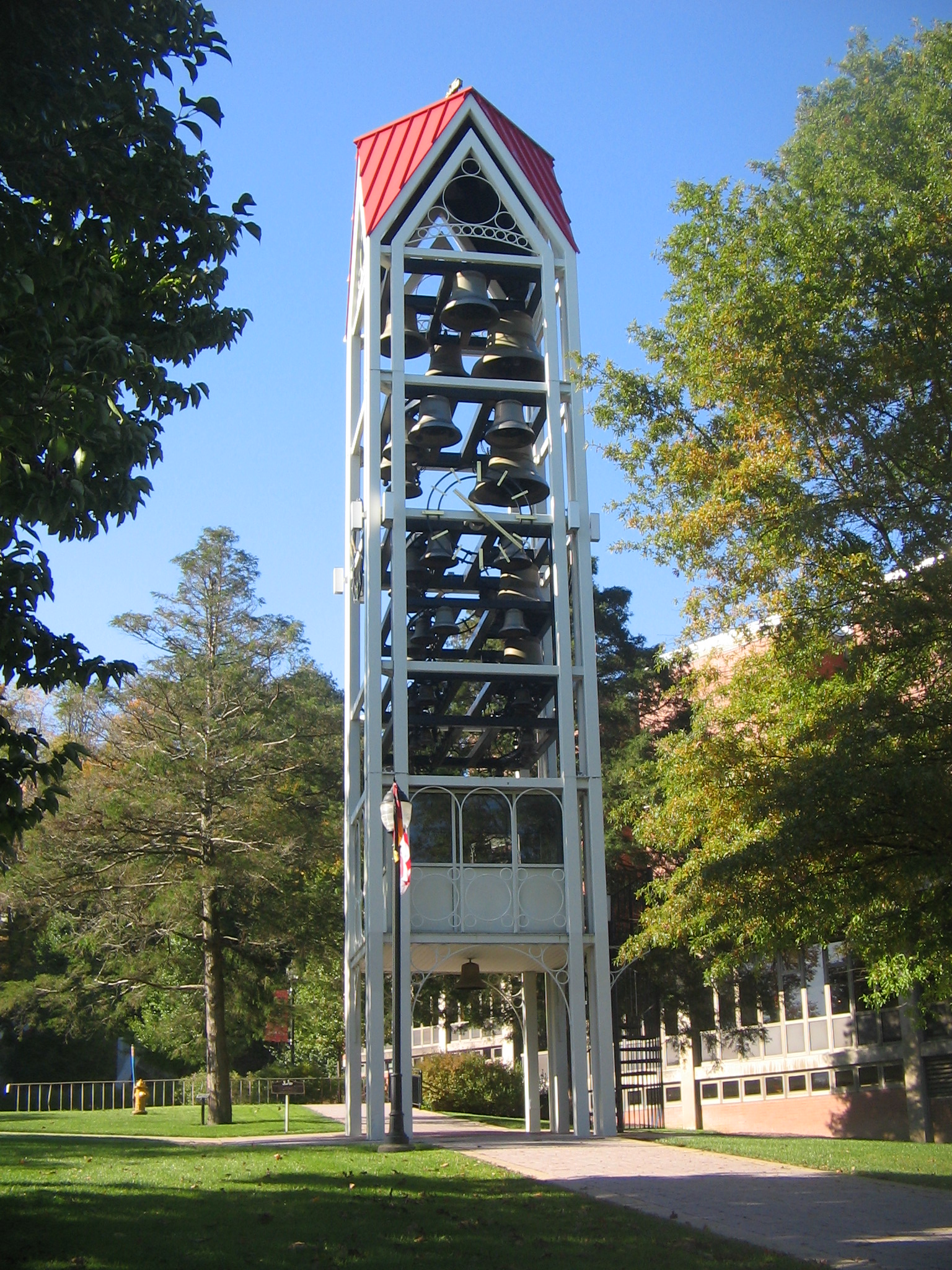
Fredericks Family Memorial Carillon

The Fredericks Family Memorial Carillon was designed and completed by the van Bergen Company, which specializes in bells, in 2000. The grand carillon is one of fewer than 200 grand carillons in North America. It weighs more than 25,000 pounds (11,000 kg) and can be played manually or by an automatic system that can produce 500 songs from memory. The bells were cast in the Fonderie Paccard.

== Academics ==
LHU's Institute for International Studies offers study abroad programs for its students. The program offer students the choice to study from 32 different schools in 20 different countries around the world. Students have the choice to study abroad for semester long, a whole academic year, or summer programs.

== Campus and student life ==
Campus Violence Prevention Program (CVPP) focuses on educational programming, awareness and prevention of domestic violence, sexual assault and stalking.

=== Student Involvement office & recreation center ===
The Student Involvement Office is composed of professional staff (employed by the Student Auxiliary Services) who are responsible for seeing that the day-to-day functions for the organization.

The Student Recreation Center is open to all students of LHU. This facility provides students with recreation activities to stay physically fit. The SRC contains an inventory of equipment that includes a rock wall, an indoor track that's 1/8 of a mile long, basketball, racquetball, and intramural sports.

=== Clubs and organizations ===
The Student Auxiliary Services (SAS) supports and funds over 140 clubs and organizations on campus. Student activity fees and profits generated through the bookstore support these clubs. Requests to start new clubs can be filled out in the SAS Office.

=== Bookstore ===
The University Bookstore at Lock Haven is owned and operated by the Student Auxiliary Services. All profits from the bookstore go towards supporting clubs and organizations on campus. The location of the bookstore is in the lower part of the PUB.

=== Media ===
CU-Lock Haven's student campus newspaper, The Eagle Eye. Students may earn a staff position on the newspaper in their first year at the university.

CU-Lock Haven's radio station is WLHU. An online radio station, which streams live on the internet, is located in the same facility as its new and improved television studio, allowing easy access between the two stations. WLHU has a free format program schedule using a studio which broadcasts daily, as well as broadcasting many sporting events and other programs throughout the school year. Students have the ability to join the school's radio club and create their own radio station broadcast.

CU-Lock Haven's student-operated television station, The Havenscope, LHUTV broadcasts news, sports, and other programs. Its studio occupies 2,300 square feet (210 m^{2}) next to WLHU, Lock Haven University's radio station. The television studio is wholly digital and has a teleprompter system, two editing bays, and field production equipment. It includes two backdrops, one for news broadcasts and one for interviews. The studio is on the sixth floor of Robinson Hall and is equipped with a green screen, at least three main broadcast cameras, an integrated TriCaster 8000 production system for audio and video production, several broadcast monitors, a roll-in system, and many other broadcast systems. The studio usually airs at least one show a week called LHU in Review hosted by LHU students which covers news, sports and other topics. In the late 1980s students began airing a short morning news segment called "The Morning Alarm" that ran at the top of the hour. The first segment aired live and was then re-broadcast over the campus television network between breakfast and lunch. The television station also broadcasts sporting events and many other programs.

=== Greek Life ===
CU-Lock Haven has 26 greek life organizations. Amongst the 18 honors societies and 1 musical band fraternity, there are 7 social fraternities and sororities, in no specific order, which include:

Fraternities:

- ΦΜΔ - Phi Mu Delta, Mu Zeta Chapter, locally known as PMD
- ΚΔΡ - Kappa Delta Rho, Alpha Alpha Chapter, locally known as KDR
- ΑΧΡ - Alpha Chi Rho, Phi Mu Chi Chapter, locally known as Crow

Sororities:

- ΖΤΑ - Zeta Tau Alpha, Zeta Nu Chapter, locally known as Zeta
- ΑΣΤ - Alpha Sigma Tau, Zeta Chapter, locally known as AST
- ΣΣΣ - Sigma Sigma Sigma, Alpha Rho Chapter, locally known as Tri Sigma
- ΣΚ - Sigma Kappa, Delta Pi Chapter, locally known as Sig Kap

== Athletics ==
- Affiliation: National Collegiate Athletic Association (NCAA) Division I and Division II
- Conference: Pennsylvania State Athletic Conference (PSAC), in Division II, for most sports. Field hockey and wrestling participate in Division I as members of the Atlantic 10 Conference and Mid-American Conference (MAC) respectively.
- Facilities: Hubert Jack Stadium, McCollum Field, Thomas Field House Center, Foundation Fields, Charlotte E. Smith Field, Rogers Gymnasium, West Branch Cross Country Course, Tomlinson Center, Zimmerli Pool
- Team name: Bald Eagles
- Team colors: crimson and white
- In 2007, Lock Haven won the National Collegiate Boxing Association national championship.
- Lock Haven won the NAIA national wrestling championship in 1961, 1963, 1966 and 1967.
- Lock Haven won the NCAA Division II Women's Softball National Championship in 2006 and 2009.
- Lock Haven won the NCAA Division II Men's Soccer National Championship in 1980 and the NCAA Division III Men's Soccer National Championship in 1977 and 1978.

== Notable alumni ==
- Harris Jacob Bixler (1862–1930), U.S. Congressman from Pennsylvania, 1921–27
- Tim Boetsch (b. 1981), Professional Mixed Martial Artist (MMA), retired Ultimate Fighting Championship (UFC) fighter
- Charlie Brenneman (b. 1981), Bald Eagle wrestler; Professional MMA fighter, formerly in the UFC's Lightweight Division
- Chris Collier, NFL player
- Tym De Santo, Finalist on HGTV Star, Host of Style File Show in Las Vegas, Nevada, Musician-Front man for Nashville-based band Black Denim
- Habern W. Freeman (b. 1941), Maryland politician
- Harry L. Haines (1880–1947), U.S. Congressman from Pennsylvania, 1931–39 and 1941–43
- Michael K. Hanna, Sr., Democratic member and Minority Whip of the Pennsylvania House of Representatives
- Brittani Kline (b. 1991), winner, America's Next Top Model, Cycle 16
- Cary Kolat 4× Pennsylvania State Champion in wrestling, 2x NCAA Champion Wrestling, current coach U.S. Naval Academy – Competed in 2000 Sydney Olympics. A three-time World Cup gold medalist, he also won World silver and bronze medals. Three U.S. Open championship medals and a pair of Pan-Am Games first-place finishes. Kolat was a member of the U.S. National Team from 1991 to 2002. In the summer of 2011, Kolat returned to competitive wrestling, was a finalist at the U.S. Open and competed in the 2012 U.S. Olympic Trials.
- Tina Martin Head Coach, University of Delaware Women's Basketball (1996–present)
- Sara McMann, 2004 Olympic Silver Medalist in women's freestyle wrestling; currently a professional mixed martial arts fighter, competing in the Women's UFC bantamweight division
- Charley Molnar (b. 1984), Head Coach, UMass Minutemen football
- Red Murray (1884–1954), professional MLB baseball player for the St. Louis Cardinals and San Francisco Giants.
- Kevin O'Dea, NFL assistant special teams coach for several teams including the San Diego Chargers, Tampa Bay Buccaneers, Detroit Lions, Arizona Cardinals, Chicago Bears, and presently with the Kansas City Chiefs
- Kevin Rush TMBSL Manager/Owner New Jersey Nets
- J. Buell Snyder (1877–1946), U.S. Congressman from Pennsylvania, 1933–46
- Jamie Varner (b. 1984), All-American wrestler and NCBA Champion; retired professional Mixed Martial Artist, former WEC Lightweight Champion, last competed in the UFC
