= Doug Turnbull =

American lacrosse player (1904–1996)

Biographical details
- Born: July 23, 1904; Baltimore, Maryland
- Died: April 12, 1996 (aged 91); Sykesville, Maryland

Playing career
- 1922–1925: Johns Hopkins
- 1926–1938: Mount Washington L.C.
- Positions: Attackman (lacrosse); Halfback (football)

Coaching career (HC unless noted)
- 1934: Gilman School
- 1939–1940: Mount Washington L.C. (asst.)

Accomplishments and honors

Awards
- 1922 USILA first-team All-American; 1923 USILA first-team All-American; 1924 USILA first-team All-American; 1925 USILA first-team All-American

Douglas Clayland Turnbull, Jr. (July 23, 1904 – April 12,1996) was an American lacrosse player. He was the first player, and remains one of only six, to have been named to the USILA All-America first team all four years of his college career. Turnbull played college lacrosse and football at Johns Hopkins University. In 1923, he led the nation in placekicking. He was inducted into the National Lacrosse Hall of Fame in 1962.

== Early life ==
Turnbull was born on July 23, 1904, in the Mount Washington neighborhood of Baltimore, Maryland. He attended Baltimore Polytechnic Institute, from which he graduated in 1921. While there, he played football, basketball, and lacrosse, and as a senior he captained the lacrosse team. During his time at Poly, his lacrosse teams defeated cross-town rival Baltimore City College three out of four times and also beat collegiate teams of Maryland and Penn.

== College career ==
Doug Turnbull attended college at Johns Hopkins University and earned a Bachelor of Science degree in engineering in 1924. During the following year he continued postgraduate studies in engineering, mathematics, and thermodynamics. Turnbull was a two-time president of the Omicron Delta Kappa leadership honor society in 1924 and 1925.

As an undergraduate, Turnbull became the first college lacrosse player named to the USILA All-America first team all four years of his collegiate career, a feat that has been matched only five times since (by Everett Smith, Frank Urso, Del Dressell, Jason Coffman, and Mikey Powell). He played every lacrosse position with the exception of goalkeeper. He played on the Hopkins football team as a left halfback, and in 1923, led the nation in placekicking. That season, he made six field goals and fifteen extra points. Head football coach Ray Van Orman named Turnbull to his All-Time Hopkins Football Team, and lacrosse coach Bill Schmeisser named him to his Honor Roll of Hopkins Lacrosse Tradition. Turnbull was inducted into the National Lacrosse Hall of Fame in 1962. He was inducted into the charter class of the Johns Hopkins Athletic Hall of Fame in 1994.

== Professional career ==
Turnbull worked for the Baltimore Gas & Electric Company from 1925 to 1943. He became a member of the company's Executive Department on September 1, 1943. In 1962, he was working as the chairman of the Locomotive Development Committee, a member of the National Coal Policy Conference, a trustee of the Maryland Academy of Sciences, a member of the Physical Fitness Commission, and the Off-Street Parking Commission.

Turnbull continued playing lacrosse after college with the prestigious Mount Washington Lacrosse Club from 1926 to 1938, including as team captain in 1930. Turnbull managed the club's ice hockey team in 1932 and 1933. He served as an assistant lacrosse coach for the club in 1939 and 1940. In 1934, he coached lacrosse at the Gilman School. Turnbull occasionally worked as a scout for Johns Hopkins, Mount Washington, and Army.

== Personal life ==
Jack Turnbull, another Johns Hopkins lacrosse star, was Doug's younger brother. He is the namesake of the Jack Turnbull Award for college lacrosse's top attackman. In 1927, Turnbull married Virginia née Steuart, with whom he had five children, four sons and one daughter.

Turnbull died in his sleep at the age of 91 on April 12, 1996, at Fairhaven Retirement Center in Sykesville, Maryland.
