= List of Phi Kappa Sigma chapters =

Phi Kappa Sigma is an American men's general collegiate fraternity. Following is a List of chapters of Phi Kappa Sigma. In the first decades, several names from the first series of chapter names were re-used. This occurred after cessation of school operations as a result of the Civil War, or after a period of long chapter dormancy, and does not appear to be a continuing practice. Active chapters noted in bold. Inactive chapters and any dormant institutions are in italics.

Chapter	Charter date and range	Institution	City	State or province	Status	References
Alpha	October 19, 1850–1994; 1997–2012	University of Pennsylvania	Philadelphia	Pennsylvania	Inactive	
Beta	1853–1876; 1983–2023	Princeton University	Princeton	New Jersey	Inactive	
Gamma	1853–1885	Lafayette College	Easton	Pennsylvania	Inactive	
Delta	1854–2006	Washington & Jefferson College	Washington	Pennsylvania	Inactive	(Note: See Greek organizations at Washington & Jefferson College.)
Epsilon	1854–1877; 1894–1984; 1989–2009	Dickinson College	Carlisle	Pennsylvania	Inactive	(Note: The 1894 restoration absorbed Alpha Zeta Phi (local), which had originated in 1889.)
**Zeta**	1854	Franklin & Marshall College	Lancaster	Pennsylvania	Active	
Eta	1854–1861; 1872–2002	University of Virginia	Charlottesville	Virginia	Inactive	
Theta (1) (see Theta (2))	1855–1861	Centenary College	Shreveport	Louisiana	Inactive, Reassigned	(Note: This college closed in 1861 due to the Civil War, but reopened by 1865.)
Iota	1855–1870; 1904–1934	Columbia University	New York City	New York	Inactive	
Kappa (1) (see Kappa (2) and (3))	1856–1861	Emory and Henry College	Emory	Virginia	Inactive, Reassigned	(Note: This college closed in 1861 due to the Civil War, reopening by 1866.)
Lambda	1855–1861; 1877–1894; 1926–1980; 1986–1998	University of North Carolina at Chapel Hill	Chapel Hill	North Carolina	Inactive	
**Mu**	1858–1861; 1893–1895; 1900	Tulane University	New Orleans	Louisiana	Active	
Nu (1) (see Nu (2))	1859–1861	Cumberland University	Lebanon	Tennessee	Inactive, Reassigned	(Note: This college closed in 1861 due to the Civil War, but reopened by 1866.)
Xi	1859–1861	University of Mississippi	Oxford	Mississippi	Inactive	(Note: This college closed in 1861 due to the Civil War, but reopened by 1865.)
Omicron (1) (see Omicron (2))	1860–1862	Centre College	Danville	Kentucky	Inactive, Reassigned	
Pi	1865–1867	Harvard University	Cambridge	Massachusetts	Inactive	
Rho (1) (see **Rho (2)**)	1865–1866	Austin College	Sherman	Texas	Inactive, Reassigned	
Sigma (1) (see **Sigma (2)**)	1870–1877; 1883–1885	Lehigh University	Bethlehem	Pennsylvania	Inactive, Reassigned	
Tau	1872–2001; 2012–2022	Randolph–Macon College	Ashland	Virginia	Inactive	
Upsilon	1872–2001	Northwestern University	Evanston	Illinois	Inactive	
Phi	1873–1877; 1889–1995	University of Richmond	Richmond	Virginia	Inactive	
Chi	1873–1875	Racine College	Richmond	Virginia	Inactive	(Note: Racine College ceased operations on August 8, 1933.)
Psi (1) (see **Psi (2)**)	1876–1880	Long Island Medical College	Brooklyn	New York	Inactive, Reassigned	(Note: Long Island Medical College or Long Island College Hospital was located in Brooklyn, New York from 1858 to 1930, when the medical college split from the hospital. In 1950 it became part of the state college system. Separately, cash strapped, the hospital was closed in 2017.)
Omega	1884–1890	Haverford College	Richmond	Virginia	Inactive	(Note: Racine College ceased operations on August 8, 1933.)
**Psi (2)** (see Psi (1))	1890–2001; 2009	Pennsylvania State University	University Park	Pennsylvania	Active	(Note: Psi (2) chapter originally formed in 1885 as the Delta chapter or "Keystone chapter" of Q.T.V., an early Latin-named regional fraternity, joining ΦΚΣ when Q.T.V. disbanded.)
**Rho (2)** (see Rho (1))	1892–1894; 1902–2017; 2026	University of Illinois Urbana-Champaign	Champaign–Urbana	Illinois	Active	
Kappa (2) (see Kappa (1) and (3))	1893–1895	Lake Forest College	Lake Forest	Illinois	Inactive, Reassigned	
Alpha Alpha	1893–1896; 1898–2012	Washington and Lee University	Lexington	Virginia	Inactive	(Note: This chapter originated as Gamma Digamma Kappa (local) prior to 1893. "Digamma" is an archaic letter of the Greek alphabet, not included in the standard list.)
**Alpha Beta**	1895–1898; 1927	University of Toronto	Toronto	Ontario, Canada	Active	(Note: At its restoration in 1927, the chapter absorbed Tau Sigma Phi (local), which had originated in 1921.)
Alpha Gamma	1896–1993; 2024 ?	West Virginia University	Morgantown	West Virginia	Active	(Note: This chapter is listed as an expansion target on the national website.)
**Alpha Delta**	1898	University of Maine	Orono	Maine	Active	(Note: This chapter originated as Omicron Epsilon Eta Pi (local), formed in 1894.)
**Alpha Epsilon**	1898	Illinois Institute of Technology	Chicago	Illinois	Active	(Note: This chapter originated as the Paragraph Club (local), formed in 1897.)
Alpha Zeta	1899–1995	University of Maryland	College Park	Maryland	Inactive	
Alpha Eta (1) (see **Alpha Eta (2)**)	1901–1905	College of Charleston	Charleston	South Carolina	Inactive, Reassigned	
**Alpha Theta**	1901–1939; 1947–1959; 1988–2002; 2008	University of Wisconsin–Madison	Madison	Wisconsin	Active	
Alpha Iota	1902–2010	Vanderbilt University	Nashville	Tennessee	Inactive	(Note: This chapter originated as the F.G.D. Club (local), formed in 1900.)
**Alpha Kappa**	1903–1995; 2007	University of Alabama	Tuscaloosa	Alabama	Active	
**Alpha Lambda**	1903–1993; 2021	University of California, Berkeley	Berkeley	California	Active	(Note: This chapter originated as the Valhalla Club (local), formed in 1896.)
**Alpha Mu**	1903	Massachusetts Institute of Technology	Cambridge	Massachusetts	Active	
**Alpha Nu**	1904	Georgia Tech	Atlanta	Georgia	Active	
**Alpha Xi**	1905	Purdue University	West Lafayette	Indiana	Active	
Alpha Omicron	1905–1943; 1948–1963	University of Michigan	Ann Arbor	Michigan	Inactive	
Alpha Pi	1906–1943	University of Chicago	Chicago	Illinois	Inactive	
Alpha Rho	1911–1991	Cornell University	Ithaca	New York	Inactive	(Note: This chapter originated as the Cereberus Club (local), formed in 1904.)
Alpha Sigma	1915–1943; 2013–2019	University of Minnesota	Minneapolis	Minnesota	Inactive	(Note: This chapter originated as Alpha Kappa Phi (local), formed in 1909.)
Alpha Tau	1915–1972	Stanford University	Stanford	California	Inactive	(Note: This chapter originated as the Lodge Club (local), formed in 1912.)
**Alpha Upsilon**	1919	University of Washington	Seattle	Washington	Active	(Note: This chapter originated as Pi Tau Upsilon (local), formed in 1914.)
Alpha Phi	1920–1990	University of Iowa	Iowa City	Iowa	Inactive	(Note: This chapter originated as the Apollo Club (local), formed in 1918.)
Alpha Chi	1925–1984; 1991–2000	Ohio State University	Columbus	Ohio	Inactive	(Note: This chapter originated as Kappa Tau Delta (local), formed in 1921.)
Alpha Psi	1926–2003; 2016–2022	University of California, Los Angeles	Los Angeles	California	Inactive	(Note: This chapter originated as Kappa Phi Delta (local), formed in 1922.)
Kappa (3) (see Kappa (1) and (2))	1928–1935	Dartmouth College	Hanover	New Hampshire	Inactive	(Note: This chapter originated as Gamma Delta Epsilon (local), formed in 1921.)
Omicron (2) (see Omicron (1))	1929–2018	University of Oklahoma	Norman	Oklahoma	Inactive	(Note: This chapter originated as Kappa Epsilon (local), formed in 1923.)
**Alpha Eta (2)** (see Alpha Eta (1))	1929–1989; 2009	University of South Carolina	Columbia	South Carolina	Active	(Note: This chapter originated as the Arrow Club (local), formed in 1924.)
Nu (2) (see Nu (1))	1936–1972; 1974–1994	Duke University	Durham	North Carolina	Inactive	(Note: This chapter originated as Sigma Alpha Omega (local), formed in 1928.)
Alpha Omega	1936–1953; 1955–1976; 1977–1984;	University of British Columbia	Vancouver	British Columbia, Canada	Inactive	(Note: This chapter originated as Pi Kappa (local), prior to 1936.)
Theta (2) (see Theta (1))	1937–2021	Kenyon College	Gambier	Ohio	Inactive	(Note: This chapter originated as Zeta Alpha (local), formed in 1923.)
**Sigma (2)** (see Sigma (1))	1941–1976; 1984–2000; 2014	University of Texas at Austin	Austin	Texas	Active	
Beta Alpha	1948–1964	University of Oregon	Eugene	Oregon	Inactive	
Beta Beta	1949–1984	University of Kansas	Lawrence	Kansas	Inactive	
Beta Gamma	1949–2013	University of Denver	Denver	Colorado	Inactive	
**Beta Delta**	1949–1971; 199x ?–1997; 2011	Michigan State University	East Lansing	Michigan	Active	(Note: This chapter originated as Kappa Epsilon (local), formed in 1947.)
Beta Epsilon	1949–1975	Oregon State University	Corvallis	Oregon	Inactive	
Beta Zeta	1953–1975; 199x ?–2002	Ohio University	Athens	Ohio	Inactive	(Note: This chapter originated as Alpha Delta Omega (local), formed in 1950.)
**Beta Eta**	1955–2017; 2023 ?	University of North Texas	Denton	Texas	Colony	(Note: This chapter originated as the Trojans Club (local), formed in 1934.)
**Beta Theta**	1955–2016; 2019	Texas Christian University	Fort Worth	Texas	Active	
Beta Iota	1959–2006	St. Lawrence University	Canton (village)	New York	Inactive	(Note: This chapter originated as Phi Delta Omega (local), formed in 1956.)
Beta Kappa	1964–1983	Drury University	Springfield	Missouri	Inactive	(Note: This chapter originated as Tau Eta Gamma (local), formed in 1962.)
**Beta Lambda**	1968	Northern Illinois University	DeKalb	Illinois	Active	(Note: This chapter originated as Sigma Tau Sigma (local), formed in 1963.)
**Beta Mu**	1968–2002; 2014	University of South Alabama	Mobile	Alabama	Active	
Beta Nu	1969–2013	Adrian College	Adrian	Michigan	Inactive	(Note: This chapter originated as Delta Theta (local), formed in 1967.)
**Beta Xi**	1969–1979; 19xx ?–2002; 2016	University of New Orleans	New Orleans	Louisiana	Active	
**Beta Omicron**	1973–2006	Virginia Tech	Blacksburg	Virginia	Colony	(Note: This chapter originated as Lambda Pi Omega (local), formed in 1966.)
Beta Pi	1975–1979; 198x ?–1990	Louisiana Tech University	Ruston	Louisiana	Inactive	
**Beta Rho**	1978	University of California, Riverside	Riverside	California	Active	
Beta Sigma	1978–1980	Salisbury University	Salisbury	Maryland	Inactive	
Beta Tau	1979–2006	Towson University	Towson	Maryland	Inactive	
Beta Upsilon	1979–2013	State University of New York at Potsdam	Potsdam	New York	Inactive	
Beta Phi	1981–1991	State University of New York at Geneseo	Geneseo	New York	Inactive	(Note: This chapter originated as Theta Omega Phi (local), formed in 1956.)
**Beta Chi**	1981–1998; 2006	Clarkson University	Potsdam	New York	Active	
**Beta Psi**	1982–2009; 2017	Washington State University	Pullman	Washington	Active	
**Beta Omega**	1982	Radford University	Radford	Virginia	Active	
Gamma Alpha	1983–1995	University at Buffalo	Buffalo	New York	Inactive	
Gamma Beta	1983–1999	Drexel University	Philadelphia	Pennsylvania	Inactive	
**Gamma Gamma**	1984	Carthage College	Kenosha	Wisconsin	Active	(Note: This chapter originated as Sigma Chi Omega (local), formed in 1982.)
Gamma Delta	1985–1992	Texas A&M University	College Station	Texas	Inactive	
Gamma Epsilon	1986–20xx ?	Seton Hall University	South Orange	New Jersey	Inactive	
Gamma Zeta	1987–200x ?	PennWest California	California (borough)	Pennsylvania	Inactive	(Note: California University of Pennsylvania and Edinboro University of Pennsylvania were renamed in 2021 after the merger of these schools.)
Gamma Eta	1987–2005	State University of New York at Fredonia	Fredonia	New York	Inactive	
Gamma Theta	1987–2010	West Chester University	West Chester	Pennsylvania	Inactive	
Gamma Iota	1988–200x ?	Millersville University	Millersville	Pennsylvania	Inactive	(Note: This chapter originated as Kappa Delta (local), formed in 1980.)
Gamma Kappa	1987–1993	State University of New York at Oneonta	Oneonta	New York	Inactive	
Gamma Lambda	1987–20xx ?	University of North Carolina at Charlotte	Charlotte	North Carolina	Inactive	(Note: This chapter originated as Beta Sigma Lambda (local), formed earlier in 1987.)
**Gamma Mu**	1988–1992; 2021	Texas State University	San Marcos	Texas	Active	
Gamma Nu	1989–1996	University at Albany, SUNY	Albany	New York	Inactive	
Gamma Xi	1989–2002; 2006–2022	George Mason University	Fairfax County	Virginia	Inactive	
Gamma Omicron	1990–2000	Rutgers University–Camden	Camden	New Jersey	Inactive	
Gamma Pi	1990–2015	Wesley College	Dover	Delaware	Inactive	(Note: Wesley College ceased operations on July 1, 2021, when Delaware State University finalized purchase of the school. The campus is now named the DSU Downtown campus, a satellite of DSU.)
Gamma Rho	1990–2005	Bryant University	Smithfield	Rhode Island	Inactive	(Note: This chapter originated as Tau Epsilon (local), formed in 1929.)
Gamma Sigma	1990–2019	Rutgers University–New Brunswick	New Brunswick	New Jersey	Inactive	(Note: This chapter originated as Kappa Sigma Omega (local), formed in 1989.)
Gamma Tau	1990–2006	University of New Hampshire	Durham	New Hampshire	Inactive	
**Gamma Upsilon**	1992	University of Massachusetts Lowell	Lowell	Massachusetts	Active	
Gamma Phi	1992–1993	Saint Leo University	St. Leo	Florida	Inactive	(Note: This chapter originated as Sigma Delta (local), formed in 1967.)
Gamma Chi	1992–20xx ?	Ithaca College	Ithaca	New York	Inactive	
Gamma Psi	1993–2005	Johnson & Wales University	Providence	Rhode Island	Inactive	
Gamma Omega	1993–20xx ?	University of Southern Maine	Gorham	Maine	Inactive	
Delta Alpha	1994–2005	Kutztown University of Pennsylvania	Kutztown	Pennsylvania	Inactive	(Note: This chapter originated as Beta Phi Delta (local), formed prior to 1994.)
Delta Beta	1994–1996	University of Massachusetts Amherst	Amherst	Massachusetts	Inactive	
**Delta Gamma**	1996–2008; 2017	Rowan University	Glassboro	New Jersey	Active	
Delta Delta	1996–2002	Florida International University	University Park	Florida	Inactive	
Delta Epsilon Colony	c.1997–199x ?	Shenandoah University	Winchester	Virginia	Inactive Colony	(Note: This group was assigned a chapter designation, but not installed as an active chapter before ceasing operations.)
Delta Zeta Colony	c.1997–199x ?	University of Colorado at Colorado Springs	Colorado Springs	Colorado	Inactive Colony	
Delta Eta	1998–201x ?; 2018–2024	McDaniel College	Westminster	Maryland	Inactive	(Note: This chapter originated as Tau Sigma Alpha (local), formed in 1995.)
Delta Theta Colony	c.1999–200x ?	Western New England University	Springfield	Massachusetts	Inactive Colony	
Delta Iota	1999–20xx ?	Marist College	Poughkeepsie	New York	Inactive	
Delta Kappa Colony	c.1999–200x ?	Marshall University	Huntington	West Virginia	Inactive Colony	
Delta Lambda	1999–2005	Niagara University	Lewiston	New York	Inactive	
Delta Mu	2000–2005	Mansfield University of Pennsylvania	Mansfield	Pennsylvania	Inactive	
Delta Nu	2000–2006	King's College	Wilkes-Barre	Pennsylvania	Inactive	
Delta Xi	2000–200x ?	PennWest Edenboro	Edinboro	Pennsylvania	Inactive	
Delta Omicron	2001–2023	Ramapo College	Mahwah	New Jersey	Inactive	
Delta Pi	2002–2021	Indiana University Bloomington	Bloomington	Indiana	Inactive	
**Delta Rho**	2002	Ursinus College	Collegeville	Pennsylvania	Active	
Delta Sigma	2005–2022	University of Maryland, Baltimore County	Catonsville	Maryland	Inactive	(Note: This chapter originated as Omega Nu Epsilon (local), formed in 2002.)
Delta Tau	2006–20xx ?	DePaul University	Chicago	Illinois	Inactive	
Delta Upsilon	2010–2017	Virginia Commonwealth University	Richmond	Virginia	Inactive	
Delta Phi	2011–2017	New York University	New York City	New York	Inactive	
Delta Chi	2012–2015	Queens University of Charlotte	Charlotte	North Carolina	Inactive	
Delta Psi	2013–2019	Temple University	Philadelphia	Pennsylvania	Inactive	
Delta Omega	2014–2018	University of Hartford	West Hartford	Connecticut	Inactive	
**Epsilon Alpha**	2016	Tarleton State University	Stephenville	Texas	Colony	
**Epsilon Beta**	2018	Oklahoma State University–Stillwater	Stillwater	Oklahoma	Active	
**Epsilon Gamma**	2022	University of Delaware	Newark	Delaware	Active	
**Epsilon Delta**	2022	University of Colorado Boulder	Boulder	Colorado	Active	

== See also ==
- Phi Kappa Sigma main article
