= California station =

California station may refer to:

- California station (CTA Congress Line)
- California station (CTA Blue Line)
- California station (CTA Green Line)
- California station (CTA Pink Line)
- California (Milan Metro)
- California Area Public Library, a former railway station in California, Pennsylvania, which is now a public library
