= List of Phi Gamma Delta chapters =

Phi Gamma Delta, commonly known as Fiji, is a North American social fraternity. The organization was founded in 1848, at Jefferson College in Canonsburg, Pennsylvania.

Initially, chapters of the fraternity were named in the order of the Greek alphabet; the first chapter was designated the Alpha chapter, the second the Beta chapter, and so on. Once the list was exhausted, the second order of chapters had the suffix "Deuteron" to denote this; for example, Alpha Deuteron, followed by Beta Deuteron, and so on. Starting in the late 1880s, the fraternity chapter designations were often references to the local chapters that the fraternity absorbed; for example, the Zeta Phi chapter at William Jewell College is named for the local group which used the name before it was absorbed by the national fraternity. All provisional chapters of the fraternity are referred to as Delta Provisional Chapter before their official chartering.

The modern naming scheme is that a chapter's Greek letters are adapted from the initials of the university's home city or institutional name. For example, the Kappa Tau chapter at the University of Tennessee derives its name from the city of Knoxville, Tennessee, the location of the university, and the Upsilon Alpha chapter at the University of Arizona derives its name directly from the university name itself.

In the fraternity's early days, chapter designations were often reused from closed chapters or chapters at closed or merged institutions. One such example is the Delta chapter at Bucknell University, founded in 1882, the second chapter to use the name; the chapter at Union University formerly used the name before the chapter's closure in 1862. If two institutions merge that both have fraternity chapters, one of the chapter designations will be retired in favor of a single name. This has only happened once in the fraternity's history, when Jefferson College and Washington University merged to form Washington & Jefferson College; the Beta chapter at Washington was retired to consolidate under the Alpha chapter name in use at Jefferson.

== Undergraduate chapters ==
In the following Phi Gamma Delta undergraduate chapter list, active chapters are indicated in bold and inactive chapters and institutions in italics.

Chapter	Charter date and range	Institution	City	State or province	Status	Ref.
**Alpha**	May 1, 1848 – 1869; September 19, 1873 – November 2018	Washington & Jefferson College	Washington	PA	Colony	(Note: Restored in 1881 by absorption of the existing Phi Delta Kappa (local), which briefly had created a five-chapter national fraternity out of the demise of a still older small national called Iota Alpha Kappa. The Iota Alpha Kappa chapter had been placed there in 1873 and Phi Delta Kappa was formed in 1874, seven years later becoming Fiji's restored Alpha chapter.) (Note: Banned on campus in 2019 due to alcohol and hazing violations.) (Note: Re-established as a colony in 2024.)
Beta Prime	June 7, 1848 – 1865	Washington University	Washington	PA	Merged	(Note: Merged with Alpha chapter with the merger of the two colleges in 1865. A two-campus model became unworkable, and the two schools were finally combined onto the Washington campus in 1869.)
Gamma Prime	January 9, 1850 – 1851	Nashville University	Nashville	TN	Inactive, Reassigned	(Note: Nashville University, later known as the University of Nashville, existed until approximately 1874, when it was divided into two preparatory academies, with a third division being ceded to Vanderbilt's medical school.)
Delta Prime	February 5, 1851 – April 1961; June 10, 1870 – c. 1873	Union University	Murfreesboro	TN	Inactive	(Note: This chapter was at a predecessor school to today's Union University, which is now situated in Jackson, Tennessee. The earlier school closed in 1873. Its assets and many of its former faculty joined the new Union University at its formation in 1874.)
**Epsilon**	March 14, 1851 – 1852; 1859–1861; October 31, 1887 – 1898; 1926	University of North Carolina at Chapel Hill	Chapel Hill	NC	Active	(Note: Reformed in 1926 by absorbing Kappa Pi, established in 1920.)
Zeta	July 1852–1853	Maryville College	Maryville	TN	Inactive	
Eta	March 23, 1855 – 1857; September 30, 1879 – 1897	Marietta College	Marietta	OH	Inactive	(Note: Reformed in 1878 by absorbing Phi Pi Theta, established in 1877.)
**Theta**	May 11, 1855 – 1859; November 22, 1875 – December 1877; June 3, 1901	University of Alabama	Tuscaloosa	AL	Active	
	May 15, 1855 – 1868	University of Mississippi	Oxford	MS	Inactive	
Iota Prime	November 20, 1855 – 1856	Centre College	Danville	KY	Inactive	
**Kappa** (See also Chi Prime)	April 1856–1861; June 13, 1881 – 1886; January 28, 1978	Baylor University	Waco	TX	Active	(Note: Re-established as a colony in 1976.)
**Lambda**	June 24, 1856 – November 1856; June 8, 1857	DePauw University	Greencastle	IN	Active	(Note: Formed from the local group Secret Ten, established in 1855.)
Mu Prime	January 30, 1856 – 1861	Howard College	Homewood	AL	Inactive	
Nu	April 8, 1857 – 1861; November 14, 1865 – 1879; November 26, 1881 – October 27, 1883; October 1887 – September 14, 1912	Bethel College	Russellville	KY	Inactive	(Note: Bethel College closed in 1964. For most of its existence, the men's campus was in Russellville, and the women's campus was in Hopkinsville.)
**Xi**	March 31, 1858 – 2020; March 2, 2024	Gettysburg College	Gettysburg	PA	Active	
Omicron	January 17, 1859 – 1860; 1867–1882; 1889–1894; 1897 – August 11, 1998; February 14, 2004 – June 2022	University of Virginia	Charlottesville	VA	Inactive	(Note: Reformed as a colony in 2002.) (Note: Suspended by the University of Virginia in 2022 due to hazing violations.)
**Pi**	June 5, 1860 – August 1, 1998; October 4, 2014	Allegheny College	Meadville	PA	Active	
Rho	November 9, 1860 – 1862	Transylvania University	Harrodsburg	KY	Inactive	
	February 18, 1861 – 1866	Soule University	Chappell Hill	TX	Inactive	
Sigma Prime (see **Pi Sigma**)	October 3, 1863 – October 26, 1872	University of Western Pennsylvania	Pittsburgh	PA	Inactive	(Note: The University of Western Pennsylvania became the University of Pittsburgh in 1908. The chapter was revived in 1916 as Pi Sigma.)
**Tau**	January 29, 1864 – May 20, 2000; May 13, 2006	Hanover College	Hanover	IN	Active	
Upsilon	November 14, 1865 – July 26, 1906	College of the City of New York	New York City	NY	Inactive	
Phi Prime	December 1865 – February 28, 1870	Baker University	Baldwin City	KS	Inactive, Reassigned	
Chi Prime (See also **Kappa**)	1866 – 1869	Waco College	Waco	TX	Inactive	(Note: Waco College merged into Baylor University in 1885, the year Baylor was moved to the city of Waco. As the Chi Prime chapter was closed by then, there was no merger with Baylor's Kappa chapter. Scattered alumni may have combined in a later restoration of Kappa.)
**Psi**	June 19, 1866 – 1873; 1882–1999; 2007	Wabash College	Crawfordsville	IN	Active	(Note: Formed by absorbing Delta Psi Theta, established in 1865.)
**Omega**	November 27, 1866 – September 18, 1999; October 6, 2007	Columbia University	New York City	NY	Active	
**Alpha Deuteron**	December 4, 1866	Illinois Wesleyan University	Bloomington	IL	Active	
Beta Deuteron	December 1866 – June 8, 1905	Roanoke College	Salem	VA	Inactive	
**Gamma Deuteron**	April 1867–1875; November 28, 1885	Knox College	Galesburg	IL	Active	
Delta Deuteron (see **Phi Second**)	October 24, 1867 – November 6, 1869	Northwestern University	Evanston	IL	Reestablished	
Epsilon Deuteron	November 13, 1867 – October 26, 1894	Muhlenberg College	Allentown	PA	Inactive	
Zeta Deuteron	February 29, 1868 – June, 1869; June 3, 1870 – 1878; October 7, 1890 - September 2025	Washington and Lee University	Lexington	VA	Inactive	
Eta Deuteron	June 1868–1879; April 23, 1994 – April 2001	University of Mississippi	Oxford	MS	Inactive	
**Theta Deuteron**	October 25, 1869 – February 22, 2008; 2012	Ohio Wesleyan University	Delaware	OH	Active	
Chi Second	October 2, 1869 – 1878	Monmouth College	Monmouth	IL	Inactive	
Iota Deuteron	December 7, 1869 – 1878	Cumberland University	Lebanon	TN	Inactive	
**Phi Second** (see Delta Deuteron)	April 25, 1870 – October 26, 1872; January 1, 1931	Northwestern University	Evanston	IL	Active	(Note: Reestablished in 1931 by absorbing Scribblers, established in 1908.)
**Delta Deuteron**	December 1870–1904; September 23, 1967	Hampden-Sydney College	Hampden Sydney	VA	Active	(Note: Reformed in 1967 by absorbing Kappa Gamma, established in 1965.)
**Kappa Deuteron**	January 19, 1871 – 1874; April 26, 1884 – 1891; March 23, 1968	University of Georgia	Athens	GA	Active	
**Zeta**	May 22, 1871	Indiana University	Bloomington	IN	Active	
Lambda Deuteron	September 21, 1872 – 1874	Thiel College	Greenville	PA	Inactive	
**Mu Deuteron**	March 8, 1873 –1873; October 25, 1919 – September 1, 2005; October 6, 2012	University of Iowa	Iowa City	IA	Active	(Note: Reestablished in 1919 from Phi Zeta Epsilon, established in 1914.)
Nu Deuteron	February 22, 1875 – 18xx ?; November 27, 1888 – 1965	Yale University	New Haven	CT	Inactive	(Note: The oldest traditional fraternities (~junior societies) at Yale named their buildings with "Hall" nicknames, by which they wished to be known on campus: Thus Phi Gamma Delta was Vernon Hall.)
**Xi Deuteron**	November 27, 1875 – 1879; 1886–1899; 1902–August 2004; May 12, 2007	Case Western Reserve University	Cleveland	OH	Active	(Note: Reformed in 1886 by absorbing Chi Upsilon, established in 1884. Reformed in 1902 by absorbing Kappa Phi Epsilon, established in 1901.)
**Omicron Deuteron**	March 25, 1878 – November 24, 1997; March 5, 2005	Ohio State University	Columbus	OH	Active	
Phi Third (see **Phi Deuteron**)	October 11, 1878 – 1883	University of Maryland	Baltimore	MD	Reestablished	
Chi Third	October 16, 1880 – 1887	Racine College	Racine	WI	Inactive	(Note: Racine College's collegiate program ended in 1889. A preparatory academy with that name continued until it ceased operations in 1933.)
Iota Second	October 30, 1880 – September 2, 1882; February 17, 1913 – 1965	Williams College	Williamstown	MA	Inactive	(Note: Reformed in 1913 by absorbing Alpha Zeta Alpha, established in 1902.) (Note: Williams College banned fraternities and sororities in the mid-1960s, with the last closing by 1970. Fiji refused to turn its building over to the college; it is now used by the town of Williamstown as an administrative office.)
**Beta Second**	February 26, 1881 – 1883; December 18, 1890 – May 1999; April 10, 2010	University of Pennsylvania	Philadelphia	PA	Active	(Note: Chapter was established at the University at Lewisburg, which became Bucknell University in 1886.)
Gamma Second (see **Delta Xi**)	February 26, 1881 – 1885	University of California, Berkeley	Berkeley	CA	Reestablished	
**Pi Deuteron**	October 29, 1881	University of Kansas	Lawrence	KS	Active	
**Delta Second**	January 28, 1882 – September 1, 2008; September 8, 2009	Bucknell University	Lewisburg	PA	Active	
Rho Deuteron	May 26, 1882 – February 1913	College of Wooster	Wooster	OH	Inactive	(Note: Chapter closed when the university banned national fraternities.) (Note: Wooster College banned national Greek chapters in 1913, with the last members graduating in 1918. Local chapters continue there today.)
Sigma Deuteron	February 27, 1883 – 2009	Lafayette College	Easton	PA	Inactive	(Note: Chapter was banned from campus for alcohol related activity in 2009.)
**Tau Deuteron**	December 11, 1883 – 1887; September 6, 1901	University of Texas at Austin	Austin	TX	Active	
Sigma Second	October 25, 1884 – November 2018	Wittenberg University	Springfield	OH	Inactive	(Note: Chapter suspended in 2018 due to hazing allegations.)
Lambda Deuteron	February 28, 1885 – 2007	Denison University	Granville	OH	Inactive	
**Alpha Phi**	November 14, 1885 – Spring 1895; August 7, 1902 – January 21, 2000; November 6, 2004	University of Michigan	Ann Arbor	MI	Active	
Beta Chi	January 12, 1886 – 2013	Lehigh University	Bethlehem	PA	Inactive	(Note: Chapter was suspended in 2013 due to poor accreditation.)
**Zeta Phi**	April 24, 1886	William Jewell College	Liberty	MO	Active	(Note: Formed from the local group Zeta Phi, established in 1871.)
**Delta Xi** (see Gamma Second)	November 27, 1886 – 1968; November 9, 1974 – July 30, 1993; February 1, 2003	University of California, Berkeley	Berkeley	CA	Active	
Theta Psi	October 31, 1887 – 1969; March 20, 1976 – 1989	Colgate University	Hamilton	NY	Inactive	(Note: Formed by absorbing the Union Debating Society, established in 1887 at Madison University, which became Colgate University in 1890.)
**Gamma Phi**	January 7, 1888	Pennsylvania State University	University Park	PA	Active	
**Kappa Nu**	March 19, 1888 – 1989; 1993–2020; 2022	Cornell University	Ithaca	NY	Active	(Note: Originally formed by absorbing Epsilon Kappa Pi.)
Iota Mu	March 25, 1889 – December 1894; May 23, 1899 – May 1998	Massachusetts Institute of Technology	Cambridge	MA	Inactive	(Note: Chapter dissolved in 1998 after an alcohol related death.)
**Rho Chi**	January 27, 1890 – April 7, 2012; March 3, 2018	University of Richmond	Richmond	VA	Active	
**Mu Sigma**	March 31, 1890	University of Minnesota	Minneapolis	MN	Active	(Note: Mu Sigma chapter's home is on the National Register of Historic Places.)
**Kappa Tau**	April 11, 1890 – 1893; November 1894 – May 14, 2012; 20xx ?	University of Tennessee	Knoxville	TN	Active	
**Beta Mu**	January 26, 1891	Johns Hopkins University	Baltimore	MD	Active	
**Pi Iota**	November 20, 1891	Worcester Polytechnic Institute	Worcester	MA	Active	(Note: Pi Iota chapter originally formed in 1886 as the Zeta chapter or "Worcester chapter" of Q.T.V., an early Latin-named regional fraternity.)
Lambda Sigma	November 30, 1891 – 1895; 1903–1971	Stanford University	Stanford	CA	Inactive	
Nu Epsilon	January 30, 1892 – February 2018	New York University	New York City	NY	Inactive	
Tau Alpha	January 28, 1893 – 1922	Trinity College	Hartford	CT	Inactive	
**Mu Second**	May 27, 1893 – April 1995; April 4, 2009	University of Wisconsin–Madison	Madison	WI	Active	
Alpha Chi	November 25, 1893 – 1962	Amherst College	Amherst	MA	Inactive	(Note: Formed by absorbing Alpha Chi, established in 1893.)
Chi Fourth	November 25, 1893 – May 2001; March 1, 2014 – 2017	Union College	Schenectady	NY	Inactive	
**Chi Iota**	August 6, 1897 – May 1998; April 28, 2007	University of Illinois	Champaign	IL	Active	
Lambda Nu	October 18, 1898 – August 25, 2021	University of Nebraska–Lincoln	Lincoln	NE	Inactive	(Note: In 1937 the Nebraska chapter was enhanced when the members of Delta Sigma Lambda's Epsilon chapter withdrew from that soon-dormant national and joined the Lambda Nu chapter of FIJI. Their group had their origin in 1924 as Delta Lambda (local).) (Note: The chapter was suspended pending completion of a sexual assault investigation involving a member and closed in 2021.)
**Omega Mu**	October 21, 1899	University of Maine	Orono	ME	Active	(Note: Omega Mu chapter originally formed in 1874 as the Beta chapter or "Orono chapter" of Q.T.V., an early Latin-named regional fraternity. Omega Mu chapter's home is on the National Register of Historic Places.)
Chi Mu	October 21, 1899 – July 3, 2006; November 5, 2011 – 2021	University of Missouri	Columbia	MO	Inactive	(Note: Chapter suspended in 2021 for hazing.)
**Sigma Tau**	July 30, 1900	University of Washington	Seattle	WA	Active	(Note: Formed by absorbing Gamma Sigma, established in 1895.)
Delta Nu	April 29, 1901 – 1965	Dartmouth College	Hanover	NH	Inactive	
Sigma Nu	May 26, 1901 – 2021	Syracuse University	Syracuse	NY	Inactive	(Note: Formed from Alpha Gamma Beta, established in 1901.)
Phi Gamma Delta	May 16, 1902 – March 20, 1968	Brown University	Providence	RI	Inactive	(Note: Formed from Pi Phi, established in 1901.)
**Chi Upsilon**	May 19, 1902	University of Chicago	Chicago	IL	Active	(Note: Formed from the local group Dragon's Tooth, established in 1899.)
**Lambda Iota**	May 30, 1902	Purdue University	West Lafayette	IN	Active	
**Alpha Iota**	March 10, 2012	Iowa State University	Ames	IA	Active	(Note: Chapter formed by absorbing Noit Avasts, established in 1897.)
Chi Sigma	June 30, 1908 – 2006; March 10, 2012 – 2021	Colorado College	Colorado Springs	CO	Inactive	(Note: Formed from Chi Sigma Gamma, established in 1904.)
**Epsilon Omicron**	July 6, 1911 – 1969; October 15, 1977 – July 29, 1998; 2014	University of Oregon	Eugene	OR	Active	(Note: Chapter formed from the local group, Beavers, established in 1907.)
**Beta Kappa**	May 16, 1912 – 1969; November 6, 1976 – April 22, 2005; 2010–spring 2012; November 2, 2019	University of Colorado Boulder	Boulder	CO	Active	(Note: Chapter formed from Beta Kappa (local), established in 1909.)
**Nu Omega**	December 29, 1916	University of Oklahoma	Norman	OK	Active	(Note: Formed from Phi Kappa Pi, established in 1913.)
**Pi Sigma** (see Sigma Prime)	December 29, 1916 – January 2, 1998; 2017	University of Pittsburgh	Pittsburgh	PA	Active	(Note: Reformed in 1916 from Phi Zeta Phi, established in 1904.)
**Nu Beta**	December 29, 1917 – Fall 2007; April 26, 2014	Rutgers University	New Brunswick	NJ	Active	(Note: Formed from Rho Sigma Zeta, established in 1907.)
**Gamma Sigma**	June 27, 1919	Sewanee: The University of the South	Sewanee	TN	Active	(Note: Formed from Alpha Gamma Sigma, established in 1918.)
**Mu Iota**	December 30, 1920	University of Idaho	Moscow	ID	Active	(Note: Formed from Alpha Kappa Epsilon, established in 1913.)
**Kappa Omicron**	December 30, 1921	Oregon State University	Corvallis	OR	Active	(Note: Formed from the Beaver Club, established in 1913.)
**Delta Kappa**	September 6, 1923	Davidson College	Davidson	NC	Active	(Note: Formed from the Bachelors Club, established in 1913)
**Tau Kappa**	September 6, 1923	University of Toronto	Toronto	ON	Active	(Note: Formed from Phi Sigma Tau, established in 1908.)
**Gamma Tau**	June 21, 1926	Georgia Tech	Atlanta	GA	Active	(Note: Formed from Gamma Tau Delta, established in 1921.)
Omega Kappa	June 23, 1926 – 1969	Occidental College	Los Angeles	CA	Inactive	(Note: Formed from Owl & Key, established in 1900.)
**Pi Gamma**	October 5, 1929	University of British Columbia	Vancouver	BC	Active	(Note: Formed from Alpha Gamma Phi, established in 1922.)
**Upsilon Alpha**	January 1, 1931 – 2014; 2017	University of Arizona	Tucson	AZ	Active	(Note: Formed from Zeta Delta Epsilon, established in 1921. It was suspended in 2014 for alcohol, hazing, and other violations.)
Lambda Alpha	January 1, 1931 – 1971; May 5, 1979 – August 6, 1991	University of California Los Angeles	Los Angeles	CA	Inactive	(Note: Formed from Delta Rho Omega, established in 1921.)
Upsilon Phi	June 28, 1940 – May 1, 1995; March 16, 2002 – August 2004; October 19, 2006 – 2022	University of Florida	Gainesville	FL	Inactive	(Note: Formed from Pi Delta Zeta, established in 1934.)
Mu Kappa	June 24, 1948 – 1968	McGill University	Montreal	QC	Inactive	(Note: Formed from Delta Phi Gamma, established in 1947)
**Beta Rho**	September 18, 1948 – July 3, 2006; April 2, 2011	Louisiana State University	Baton Rouge	LA	Active	
Phi Mu	October 28, 1948 – November 5, 1988	Westminster College	Fulton	MO	Inactive	(Note: Formed from Phi Chi Club, established in 1947.)
Sigma Chi	November 13, 1948 – September 28, 1990; October 15, 1995 – May 20, 2000; August 19, 2011 – August 2016	University of Southern California	Los Angeles	CA	Inactive	(Note: Formed from Phi Gam Club, established in 1947. Disbanded due to hazing and alcohol charges in 2016.)
**Delta Tau**	December 4, 1948	Southern Methodist University	University Park	TX	Active	(Note: Formed from Nu Delta, established in 1948.)
**Pi Mu**	October 7, 1950	Washington State University	Pullman	WA	Active	(Note: Formed from Delta Phi Gamma, established in 1948.)
**Kappa Rho**	December 9, 1950 – February 3, 2001; March 9, 2008	University of Rhode Island	Kingston	RI	Active	(Note: Formed from Kappa Rho, established in 1910. The University of Rhode Island was known as Rhode Island State College until 1951.)
**Lambda Tau**	December 11, 1954 – February 2020; 2024	Texas Tech University	Lubbock	TX	Active	(Note: Formed from Kemas, established in 1932.)
**Mu Upsilon**	September 28, 1957 – March 30, 2007; 2010	Miami University	Oxford	OH	Active	
Lambda Kappa	April 26, 1958 – 1987	Lawrence University	Appleton	WI	Inactive	
**Upsilon Kappa**	October 25, 1958 – 1983; January 22, 1994	University of Kentucky	Lexington	KY	Active	
**Epsilon Lambda**	May 9, 1959 – May 1999; September 11, 2010	Michigan State University	East Lansing	MI	Active	
**Kappa Upsilon**	April 23, 1960 – 1980; November 6, 2021	Kent State University	Kent	OH	Active	
**Alpha Upsilon**	October 27, 1962	Auburn University	Auburn	AL	Active	
**Sigma Omicron**	November 10, 1962	Oklahoma State University	Stillwater	OK	Active	
**Alpha Gamma**	November 7, 1964	Kettering University	Flint	MI	Active	(Note: Formed from Alpha Gamma Upsilon, established in 1932 at the General Motors Institute, which became GMI Engineering & Management Institute in 1982 and Kettering University in 1998.)
Delta Gamma	January 16, 1965 – June 1994	Emory University	Atlanta	GA	Inactive	
**Alpha Sigma**	February 6, 1965	Arizona State University	Tempe	AZ	Active	
**Alpha Omega**	September 24, 1966 – June 16, 2009; April 23, 2016	Ohio University	Athens	OH	Active	
Alpha Nu	October 23, 1966 – January 2018	University of New Mexico	Albuquerque	NM	Inactive	
Tau Omicron	November 12, 1966 – 1971	College of Puget Sound	Tacoma	WA	Inactive	
**Phi Sigma**	November 3, 1967 – spring 2011; March 19, 2016	Florida State University	Tallahassee	FL	Active	
**Lambda Epsilon**	November 18, 1967 – 1975; Fall 2022	University of Wyoming	Laramie	WY	Active	
Upsilon Sigma	January 12, 1968 – May 1, 1997; 2021 – 2025	Utah State University	Logan	UT	Inactive	
**Lambda Omega**	February 3, 1968 – July 26, 2004; February 5, 2011	University of Western Ontario	London	ON	Active	
**Chi Deuteron**	September 28, 1968	Kansas State University	Manhattan	KS	Active	
Phi Tau	October 26, 1968 – May 1, 2010; April 20, 2014 – July 2018	University of Texas at Arlington	Arlington	TX	Inactive	
**Phi Kappa**	November 11, 1968 – October 18, 1991; April 19, 2008	Colorado State University	Fort Collins	CO	Active	
Phi Alpha	May 10, 1969 – February 7, 1991; November 16, 2002 – 2024	University of Arkansas	Fayetteville	AR	Inactive	
**Beta Upsilon**	November 1, 1969 – 2017; 2022	University of Vermont	Burlington	VT	Active	(Note: The chapter was suspended for four years in 2017 for hazing and alcohol.)
**Rho Phi**	November 22, 1969	Rose-Hulman Institute of Technology	Terre Haute	IN	Active	(Note: Chapter formed at Rose Polytechnic Institute, which became Rose-Hulman Institute of Technology in 1971.)
**Epsilon Alpha**	October 24, 1970	University of Alberta	Edmonton	AB	Active	
**Sigma Mu**	November 21, 1970	Mississippi State University	Starkville	MS	Active	
**Chi Omicron**	February 20, 1971 – Fall 2006; Fall 2008–2024	University of Cincinnati	Cincinnati	OH	Inactive	
Iota Sigma	March 27, 1971 – Spring 2007; February 16, 2013 – 2022	Indiana State University	Terre Haute	IN	Inactive	
Kappa Phi	May 8, 1971 – 1981; 2016 – 2024	University of South Florida	Tampa	FL	Inactive	
**Rho Alpha**	May 13, 1972	Virginia Tech	Blacksburg	VA	Active	
**Kappa Mu**	November 4, 1972 – May 1999; October 11, 2014	Western Michigan University	Kalamazoo	MI	Active	
**Mu Tau**	November 18, 1972 – June 12, 2012; 2022	University of Memphis	Memphis	TN	Active	
**Mu Alpha**	January 19, 1974 – January 26, 2013; March 28, 2026	West Virginia University	Morgantown	WV	Active	
**Phi Upsilon**	March 23, 1974	University of North Alabama	Florence	AL	Active	
**Chi Alpha**	April 6, 1974 – 1988; 2017	Clemson University	Clemson	SC	Active	
Epsilon Chi	April 26, 1975 – 2023	University of Wisconsin–Eau Claire	Eau Claire	WI	Inactive	
Phi Iota	May 3, 1975 – 1983	Idaho State University	Pocatello	ID	Inactive	
Rho Upsilon	May 21, 1977 – September 2019	University of California, Riverside	Riverside	CA	Inactive	
**Omega Deuteron**	April 29, 1978 – May 1988; 2015	Old Dominion University	Norfolk	VA	Active	
**Phi Deuteron** (see Phi Third)	January 27, 1979 – July 2019; 2023	University of Maryland, College Park	College Park	MD	Active	
**Alpha Mu**	March 24, 1979 – May 17, 1997; March 22, 2003 – 2018; 2023	Texas A&M University	College Station	TX	Active	
**Tau Chi**	November 1, 1980	Texas Christian University	Fort Worth	TX	Active	
**Theta Tau**	February 28, 1981	Tennessee Technological University	Cookeville	TN	Active	
**Delta Upsilon**	April 25, 1981 – 1989; 2025	University of Denver	Denver	CO	Active	
**Tau Upsilon**	April 3, 1982 – May 20, 2000; December 2, 2006	Tulane University	New Orleans	LA	Active	
**Iota Chi**	May 8, 1982	University of California, Irvine	Irvine	CA	Active	
**Beta Pi**	November 13, 1982	Bradley University	Peoria	IL	Active	
Delta Phi	January 22, 1983 – June 11, 2011	Jacksonville University	Jacksonville	FL	Inactive	
**Upsilon Chi**	February 4, 1984	University of Calgary	Calgary	AB	Active	
Beta Gamma	March 31, 1984 – August 2022	Bowling Green State University	Bowling Green	OH	Inactive	
**Tau Nu**	November 3, 1984 – 2019; 2021	Rensselaer Polytechnic Institute	Troy	NY	Active	(Note: The chapter was suspended for two years in 2019 for violating the university's alcohol policy.)
Upsilon Lambda	March 9, 1985 – June 11, 2011	La Salle University	Philadelphia	PA	Inactive	
**Gamma Kappa**	March 23, 1985	Colorado School of Mines	Golden	CO	Active	
**Alpha Omicron**	September 27, 1986	University of Akron	Akron	OH	Active	
Sigma Delta	November 1, 1986 – June 1995; May 4, 2013 – August 2020	San Diego State University	San Diego	CA	Inactive	
Upsilon Mu	May 23, 1987 – March 1, 2006	University of Montana	Missoula	MT	Inactive	
Phi Chi	November 14, 1987 – May 17, 2006	California State University, Fresno	Fresno	CA	Inactive	(Note: Suspended in 2006 for alcohol related activity.)
**Sigma Lambda**	April 9, 1988 – February 1995; September 26, 2026	University of Utah	Salt Lake City	UT	Active	
Sigma Beta	May 6, 1989 – November 14, 2004	San Jose State University	San Jose	CA	Inactive	(Note: Chapter was suspended in 2004.)
Phi Pi	March 31, 1990 – 2013	Villanova University	Villanova	PA	Inactive	
Lambda Beta	October 13, 1990 – August 1, 1997; October 13, 2012 – 2023	California State University Long Beach	Long Beach	CA	Inactive	
**Sigma Upsilon**	November 10, 1990 – June 1996; August 29, 2020	Texas State University	San Marcos	TX	Active	(Note: Chapter formed at Southwest Texas State University, which became Texas State University in 2003.)
Gamma Chi	October 10, 1992 – September 20, 2003	University of California, Santa Barbara	Santa Barbara	CA	Inactive	
Gamma Nu	November 14, 1992 – September 17, 1999	Aldelphi University	Garden City	NY	Inactive	
Nu Chi	February 20, 1993 – January 26, 2006	California State, Northridge	Northridge	CA	Inactive	
**Chi Lambda**	May 15, 1993 – January 17, 2004; November 7, 2009	University of California, San Diego	San Diego	CA	Active	
**Sigma Alpha**	November 13, 1993 – spring 2009; September 26, 2020	University of Texas at San Antonio	San Antonio	TX	Active	
Omega Phi	February 19, 1994 – May 19, 2025	University of Central Florida	Orlando	FL	Inactive	
**Delta Iota**	November 5, 1994	Drake University	Des Moines	IA	Active	
**Mu Chi**	November 19, 1994	James Madison University	Harrisonburg	VA	Active	
Pi Upsilon	November 11, 1995 – November 24, 1997	Princeton University	Princeton	NJ	Inactive	
**Epsilon Iota**	April 15, 2000	University of Evansville	Evansville	IN	Active	
**Beta Sigma**	February 24, 2001	Ball State University	Muncie	IN	Active	
**Kappa Chi**	November 3, 2001	William Woods University	Fulton	MO	Active	
**Nu Sigma**	April 6, 2002	North Carolina State University	Raleigh	NC	Active	
Sigma Phi	November 20, 2004 – 2018	Florida International University	University Park	FL	Inactive	
Upsilon Tau	August 27, 2005 – 2024	University of Toledo	Toledo	OH	Inactive	
**Omega Chi**	May 3, 2008	Chapman University	Orange	CA	Active	
**Psi Mu**	February 28, 2009	Missouri State University	Springfield	MO	Active	
Nu Kappa	April 25, 2009 – 2019	University of Nebraska at Kearney	Kearney	NE	Inactive	
Nu Delta	October 17, 2009 – 2022	University of Delaware	Newark	DE	Inactive	
**Pi Chi**	March 3, 2010	University of North Carolina Wilmington	Wilmington	NC	Active	
Lambda Chi	March 27, 2010 – February 2018	College of Charleston	Charleston	SC	Inactive	
**Chi Eta**	May 1, 2010	Western Kentucky University	Bowling Green	KY	Active	
Pi Nu	October 9, 2010 – 2024	East Carolina University	Greenville	NC	Inactive	(Note: Chapter was suspended in 2024 by the international organization for hazing allegations.)
**Chi Rho**	October 16, 2010	Pennsylvania Western University	California	PA	Active	(Note: Chapter formed at California University of Pennsylvania, which became Pennsylvania Western University in 2022.)
Beta Nu	November 6, 2010 – 2024	Appalachian State University	Boone	NC	Inactive	
Nu Tau	2010–February 2023	University of North Texas	Denton	TX	Inactive	(Note: In February 2023, the Archons conducted a trial of the Nu Tau and found the chapter guilty of hazing and violating the fraternity’s risk management policy. As a result, the Archons closed the chapter.)
Gamma Third	February 25, 2011 – June 2019	Vanderbilt University	Nashville	TN	Inactive	(Note: Banned from campus in 2019 due to hazing violations.)
**Tau Delta**	March 4, 2012	University of Texas at Dallas	Richardson	TX	Active	
Mu Beta	April 21, 2012 – 2025	Coastal Carolina University	Conway	SC	Inactive	
Sigma Kappa	March 9, 2013 – December 2020	University of Connecticut	Mansfield	CT	Inactive	(Note: The chapter was suspended in 2020 for hazing and underage drinking.)
**Epsilon Rho**	April 20, 2013	Embry–Riddle Aeronautical University, Daytona Beach	Daytona Beach	FL	Active	
**Lambda Pi**	November 2, 2013	DePaul University	Chicago	IL	Active	
Eta Mu	March 8, 2014 – 2021	University of Massachusetts Amherst	Amherst	MA	Inactive	
Rho Nu	April 5, 2014 – 2020	Rowan University	Glassboro	NJ	Inactive	
Nu Upsilon	April 12, 2014 – 2019	Nova Southeastern University	Fort Lauderdale	FL	Inactive	
**Alpha Pi**	May 10, 2014	University of San Diego	San Diego	CA	Active	
Omega Nu	September 6, 2014 – 2022	Ohio Northern University	Ada	OH	Inactive	
**Mu Pi**	November 15, 2014	Virginia Commonwealth University	Richmond	VA	Active	
**Sigma Eta**	March 14, 2015	Sam Houston State University	Huntsville	TX	Active	
Omicron Chi	March 28, 2015 – 2021	Oklahoma City University	Oklahoma City	OK	Inactive	
Alpha Psi	April 18, 2015 – 2022	Austin Peay State University	Clarksville	TN	Inactive	
Eta Chi	March 5, 2016 – 2022	Quinnipiac University	Hamden	CT	Inactive	
**Iota Pi**	April 2, 2016	Indiana University Indianapolis	Indianapolis	IN	Active	(Note: Chapter formed at Indiana University-Purdue University Indianapolis, which split into Indiana University Indianapolis and Purdue University in Indianapolis in 2024.)
Alpha Rho	April 9, 2016 – 2023	University of Central Arkansas	Conway	AR	Inactive	
**Mu Lambda**	September 24, 2016	University of South Carolina	Columbia	SC	Active	
Gamma Rho	October 22, 2016 – 2023	Grand Valley State University	Allendale	MI	Inactive	
**Mu Phi**	October 29, 2016	University of Montevallo	Monevallo	AL	Active	
**Nu Alpha**	November 5, 2016	Northern Arizona University	Flagstaff	AZ	Active	
**Chi Kappa**	November 19, 2016	West Chester University	West Chester	PA	Active	
**Alpha Beta**	April 1, 2017	University of Alabama at Birmingham	Birmingham	AL	Active	
**Beta Psi**	April 8, 2017	Boise State University	Boise	ID	Active	
**Nu Iota**	April 23, 2017	Illinois State University	Normal	IL	Active	
**Delta Chi**	May 19, 2018	University of California, Davis	Davis	CA	Active	
**Nu Eta**	October 12, 2018	Northeastern University	Boston	MA	Active	
**Delta Mu**	October 27, 2018	Wayne State University	Detroit	MI	Active	
**Rho Tau**	November 3, 2018	College of William and Mary	Williamsburg	VA	Active	
**Tau Beta**	October 17, 2020	University of Tampa	Tampa	FL	Active	
**Chi Nu**	May 2, 2021	Christopher Newport University	Newport News	VA	Active	
**Sigma Omega**	April 22, 2023	Seton Hall University	South Orange	NJ	Active	
**Chi Tau**	April 20, 2024	Texas A&M University Corpus Christi	Corpus Christi	TX	Active	
		Loyola University New Orleans	New Orleans	LA	Colony	(Note: Colony established in 2019.)
		George Washington University	Washington	DC	Colony	(Note: Colony established in 2022.)

== Graduate chapters ==
Following are the Phi Gamma Delta graduate chapters, with active chapters in bold and inactive chapters in italics.

Chapter	Charter date and range	City	State or province	Status	Ref.
**Alpha (West Lafayette, IN) Graduate Chapter**	April 7, 1868	West Lafayette	IN	Active	
Chattanooga Tennessee Graduate Chapter	June 30, 1886	Chattanooga	TN	Inactive	
**Columbus Ohio Graduate Chapter**	September 30, 1887	Columbus	OH	Active	
Kansas City Missouri Graduate Chapter	January 1, 1888	Kansas City	MO	Inactive	
**Cleveland Ohio Graduate Chapter**	April 30, 1888	Cleveland	OH	Active	
Chicago Illinois Graduate Chapter	February 27, 1892	Chicago	IL	Inactive	
Beta (Indianapolis, IN) Graduate Chapter	September 30, 1894	Indianapolis	IN	Inactive	
**Omicron (Pittsburgh) Graduate Chapter**	March 26, 1898	Pittsburgh	PA	Active	
**Denver Colorado Graduate Chapter**	January 16, 1899	Denver	CO	Active	
**Cincinnati Ohio Graduate Chapter**	October 21, 1899	Cincinnati	OH	Active	
**Seattle Washington Graduate Chapter**	January 1, 1904	Seattle	WA	Active	
Saint Louis Missouri Graduate Chapter	October 31, 1906	St. Louis	MO	Inactive	
Detroit Michigan Graduate Chapter	January 31, 1907	Detroit	MI	Inactive	
Des Moines Iowa Graduate Chapter	January 1, 1908	Des Moines	IA	Inactive	
Knoxville Graduate Chapter	January 1, 1909	Knoxville	TN	Inactive	
Oklahoma City Oklahoma Graduate Chapter	January 1, 1913	Oklahoma City	OK	Inactive	
**National Capital Fijis (Washington, DC) Graduate Chapter**	December 26, 1916	Washington, D.C.	DC	Active	
**Birmingham Alabama Graduate Chapter**	December 27, 1916	Birmingham	AL	Active	
Akron Ohio Graduate Chapter	September 30, 1917	Akron	OH	Inactive	
**Boston Massachusetts Graduate Chapter**	January 1, 1920	Boston	MA	Active	
**Houston Graduate Chapter**	June 1, 1921	Houston	TX	Active	
**Atlanta Georgia Graduate Chapter**	November 9, 1923	Atlanta	GA	Active	
**Toronto Graduate Chapter**	May 6, 1924	Toronto	ON	Active	
**Southeast Florida (Miami, FL) Graduate Chapter**	January 23, 1926	Miami	FL	Active	
Hartford Connecticut Graduate Chapter	July 9, 1926	Hartford	CT	Inactive	
Grand Rapids (Southwest Michigan) Graduate Chapter	January 28, 1927	Grand Rapids	MI	Inactive	
Louisville Kentucky Graduate Chapter	March 1, 1927	Louisville	KY	Inactive	
Tampa Florida Graduate Chapter	October 31, 1927	Tampa	FL	Active	
Vancouver Graduate Chapter	March 24, 1930	Vancouver	BC	Inactive	
Albany New York Graduate Chapter	September 26, 1930	Albany	NY	Inactive	
Long Beach Graduate Chapter	June 18, 1935	Long Beach	CA	Inactive	
Sacramento California Graduate Chapter	October 28, 1935	Sacramento	CA	Inactive	
Crawfordsville Indiana Graduate Chapter	December 19, 1947	Crawfordsville	IN	Inactive	
Honolulu Hawaii Graduate Chapter	April 15, 1948	Honolulu	HI	Inactive	
**Phoenix Graduate Chapter**	May 26, 1948	Phoenix	AZ	Active	
**Utah Graduate Chapter**	December 27, 1956	Salt Lake City	UT	Active	
Portland Maine Graduate Chapter	January 9, 1958	Portland	ME	Inactive	
Austin Texas Graduate Chapter	May 29, 1961	Austin	TX	Inactive	
Fresno California Graduate Chapter	March 4, 1962	Fresno	CA	Inactive	
Richardson Texas Graduate Chapter	June 24, 1962	Richardson	TX	Inactive	
**Riverside-San Bernardino California Graduate Chapter**	June 24, 1962	Riverside	CA	Active	
Albuquerque New Mexico Graduate Chapter	June 16, 1963	Albuquerque	NM	Inactive	
Orlando Florida Graduate Chapter	August 21, 1963	Orlando	FL	Inactive	
Piedmont Triad North Carolina Graduate Chapter	November 2, 1964	Greensboro	NC	Inactive	
**Bluegrass (Lexington, KY) Graduate Chapter**	May 26, 1967	Lexington	KY	Active	
Gainesville Florida Graduate Chapter	May 10, 1968	Gainesville	FL	Inactive	
**Arlington Texas Graduate Chapter**	December 8, 1970	Arlington	TX	Active	
**Epsilon Alpha FIJI Society (Edmonton, AB) Graduate Chapter**	September 10, 1974	Edmonton	AB	Active	
**Calgary Graduate Chapter**	November 6, 1981	Calgary	AB	Active	
Silicon Valley (San Jose, CA) Graduate Chapter	April 11, 1988	San Jose	CA	Inactive	
**Clarksville Tennessee Graduate Chapter**	December 21, 2022	Clarksville	TN	Active	
Alberta Graduate Chapter			AB	Inactive	
Bay Area (San Francisco, CA) Graduate Chapter		San Francisco	CA	Inactive	
Charleston South Carolina Graduate Chapter		Charleston	SC	Inactive	
**Charlotte North Carolina Graduate Chapter**		Charlotte	NC	Active	
**Dallas Texas Graduate Chapter**		Dallas	TX	Active	
Evansville Indiana Graduate Chapter		Evansville	IN	Inactive	
**Free State Fiji (Maryland) Graduate Chapter**		Baltimore	MD	Active	
**Golden Triangle (Northcentral, MS) Graduate Chapter**		Starkville	MS	Active	
Golf Capitol (Pinehurst, NC) Graduate Chapter		Pinehurst	NC	Inactive	
Greater Arizona Fijis (Tucson/Phoenix, AZ) Graduate Chapter		Tucson	AZ	Inactive	
**Greater Germany Graduate Chapter**		Berlin, Germany		Active	
**Gulf Coast (Sarasota, FL) Graduate Chapter**		Sarasota	FL	Active	
Hilton Head Graduate Chapter		Hilton Head Island	SC	Inactive	
Las Vegas Nevada Graduate Chapter		Las Vegas	NV	Inactive	
Madison Wisconsin Graduate Chapter		Madison	WI	Inactive	
Midsouth (Memphis, TN) Graduate Chapter		Memphis	TN	Inactive	
Milwaukee Wisconsin Graduate Chapter		Milwaukee	WI	Inactive	
Music City (Nashville, TN) Graduate Chapter		Nashville	TN	Inactive	
**New Orleans Graduate Chapter**		New Orleans	LA	Active	
Norfolk Virginia (Hampton Roads) Graduate Chapter		Norfolk	VA	Inactive	
North Star (Minneapolis, MN) Graduate Chapter		Minneapolis	MN	Inactive	
NE Florida (Jacksonville, FL) Graduate Chapter		Jacksonville	FL	Inactive	
**Omaha Nebraska Graduate Chapter**		Omaha	NE	Active	
Orange County California Graduate Chapter		Orange	CA	Inactive	
Portland Oregon Graduate Chapter		Portland	OR	Inactive	
**Richmond Virginia Graduate Chapter**		Richmond	VA	Active	
San Antonio Texas Graduate Chapter		San Antonio	TX	Inactive	
San Diego California Graduate Chapter		San Diego	CA	Inactive	
**Southern Coast (Fort Lauderdale, FL) Graduate Chapter**		Fort Lauderdale	FL	Active	
**Southwest Florida (Naples, FL) Graduate Chapter**		Naples	FL	Active	
Space Coast (Melbourne, FL) Graduate Chapter		Melbourne	FL	Inactive	
Spokane Washington Graduate Chapter		Spokane	WA	Inactive	
Triangle (Raleigh, NC) Graduate Chapter		Raleigh	NC	Inactive	
Tulsa Oklahoma Graduate Chapter		Tulsa	OK	Inactive	
**Xi (New York City) Graduate Chapter**		New York City	NY	Active	
**Western Wisconsin (Eau Claire) Graduate Chapter**		Eau Claire	WI	Active	
Wilmington North Carolina Graduate Chapter		Wilmington	NC	Inactive	
