= Andrew Combs =

Andrew Combs may refer to:

- Andrew Combs (lacrosse)
- Andrew Combs (musician)
