= Jennings–Gallagher House =

Historic house in Pennsylvania, United States

- U.S. National Register of Historic Places
- Washington County History & Landmarks Foundation Landmark
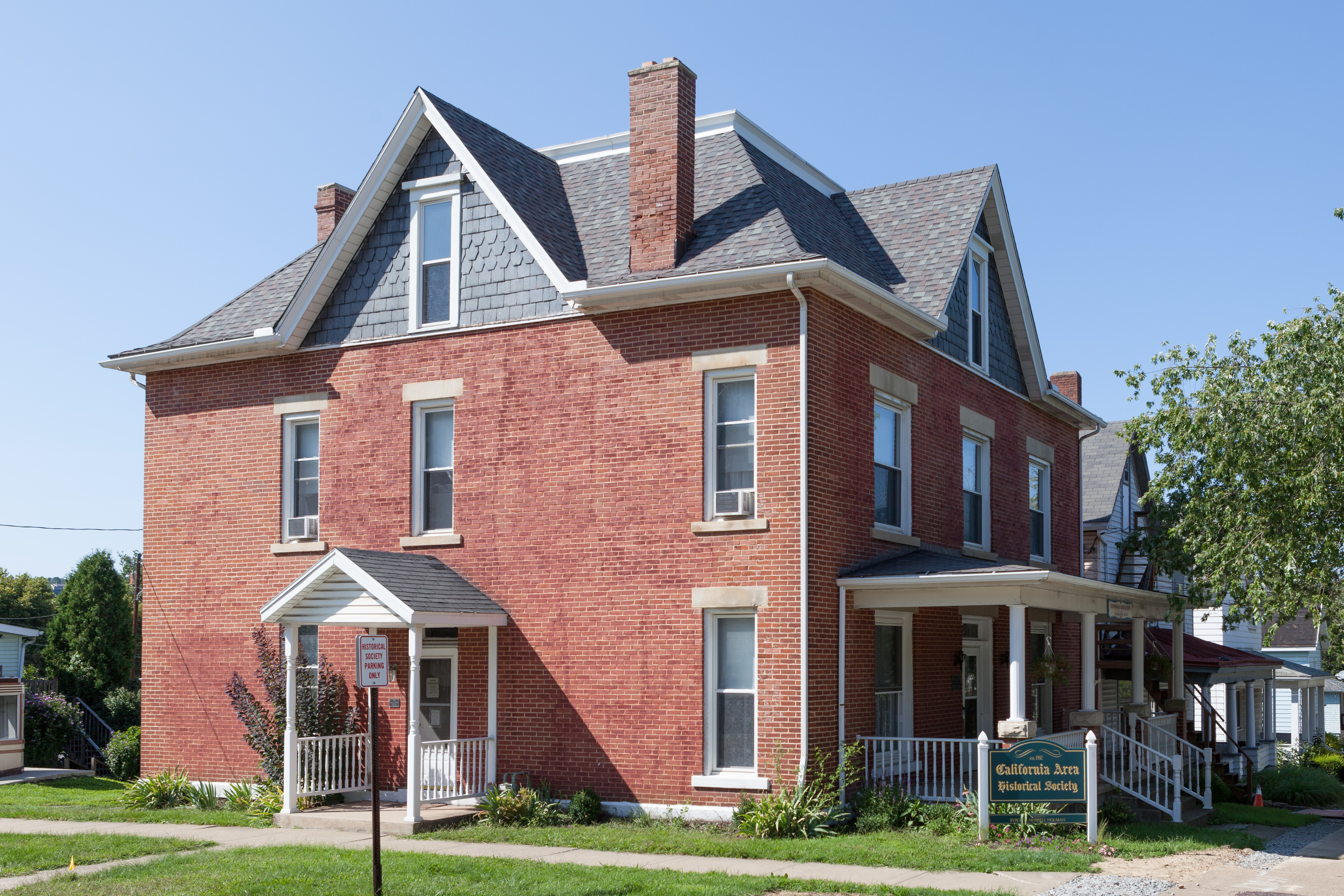
- Jennings–Gallagher House in August, 2014

- Location within Pennsylvania Location within the United States
- Location: 429 Wood St., California, Pennsylvania
- Coordinates: 40°3′52″N 79°53′26″W
- Area: less than one acre
- Built: 1903
- Architectural style: Queen Anne, Colonial Revival
- NRHP reference No.: 96000318
- Added to NRHP: March 28, 1996

The Jennings–Gallagher House is an historic building that is located at the corner of Fifth and Wood Streets, at 429 Wood Street, in California, Pennsylvania, United States.

It retains its original woodwork, stained glass and fireplaces.

== History and architectural features ==
A colonial revival-style house, it was built in 1903 by Jonathan Winnett Jennings, a Methodist minister from the Monongahela Valley. The house stayed in the Jennings family until 1919; in 1930 when it was acquired by the Gallagher family. Charles Gallagher was the general superintendent of the Allied Chemical Corporation at Newell, Pennsylvania, a director of People's National Bank and a Trustee of California University of Pennsylvania.

In 1993, it was donated to the Historical Society. The house is designated as a historic residential landmark/farmstead by the Washington County History & Landmarks Foundation.
