= Bill Schmeisser =

Lacrosse player, coach, and patron (1880–1941)

William C. Schmeisser

Biographical details
- Born: August 4, 1880; Baltimore, Maryland
- Died: July 1, 1941 (aged 60); Baltimore, Maryland

Playing career
- 1900–1902, 1905: Johns Hopkins
- Position: Defenseman

Coaching career (HC unless noted)
- 1902: Johns Hopkins (co-HC)
- 1903: Johns Hopkins
- 1905–1909: Johns Hopkins
- 1923–1925: Johns Hopkins

Head coaching record
- Overall: 57–15–1

Accomplishments and honors

Championships
- 6 ILA National Championships (1902, 1903, 1906, 1907, 1908, 1909); 2 USILA National Championships (1923, 1924)

Awards
- National Lacrosse Hall of Fame

William Christian Schmeisser (August 4, 1880 – July 1, 1941), known widely as "Father Bill", was an American lacrosse player, coach, and patron. He served as the head coach of the Johns Hopkins Blue Jays for ten non-consecutive years, and won eight national championships. He was also an active patron of the sport and promoter of its development. He helped found the highly successful amateur Mount Washington Lacrosse Club. Schmeisser viewed his role in the sport as altruistic, and he never received monetary compensation for coaching.

== Education ==
He was born on August 4, 1880, in Baltimore, Maryland, and attended high school at Baltimore City College, from which he graduated in 1899. He received his undergraduate college education at Johns Hopkins University and received a Bachelor of Arts degree in 1902. While at Hopkins, Schmeisser played as a defenseman on the lacrosse team from 1900 to 1902. He was also a member of the Beta Mu chapter of Phi Gamma Delta.

Schmeisser returned to Johns Hopkins for graduate study in the field of political economy, and played an additional year of lacrosse, in 1905. In 1907, he graduated from the school of law at the University of Maryland, Baltimore.

== Role in lacrosse ==
In 1902, he served as team captain and as a co-coach for Johns Hopkins alongside Ronald T. Abercrombie. That season, the team was awarded the Intercollegiate Lacrosse Association (ILA) national championship. The following year, Schmeisser became the sole head coach, and the team again garnered the ILA championship. He returned to Hopkins as its head lacrosse coach from 1905 to 1909. Schmeisser took the position again from 1923 to 1925, and Johns Hopkins secured the United States Intercollegiate Lacrosse Association (USILA) championships in 1923 and 1924.

Schmeisser helped organize and played on the Mount Washington Lacrosse Club, a highly successful Baltimore-based amateur team. Since there was no professional league, many former college lacrosse stars played for Mount Washington. The club regularly participated in exhibition games against the top intercollegiate programs and very rarely lost. In 1904, Schmeisser and Abercrombie co-authored Lacrosse: From Candidate to Team, a book which became the sport's standard text for the next fifty years. He also helped promote lacrosse at the University of Maryland and the Naval Academy.

Schmeisser was known to often carry a furled umbrella on the sidelines, regardless of the weather, and he stated that his reason for doing so was, "This way I know it won't rain." In 1919, he helped start the tradition in which flags bearing gold stars are attached to the goals prior to the season opener. This was first done to honor three former Hopkins players who were killed in action during the First World War. The tradition has continued to date and additional stars have been added for players killed in the Second World War and Viet Nam.

In 1928, Johns Hopkins won a postseason tournament to represent the United States in a lacrosse exhibition event during the Summer Olympics in Amsterdam, and Schmeisser accompanied the team as an assistant coach. He also traveled to England in 1937 alongside the all-star team. In 1941, just two months before his death, Schmeisser convinced the undefeated Johns Hopkins team to accept a challenge from the likewise undefeated Mount Washington Club. The Blue Jays edged their opponents, 7–6.

Schmeisser was a long-time official of the USILA, and he held positions that included member of the rules committee, chief referee, and president. US Lacrosse, the American sport's governing body, inducted him into the National Lacrosse Hall of Fame in 1957. He was inducted into the Johns Hopkins University Athletic Hall of Fame in 1995. He is also the namesake of the William C. Schmeisser Award, which is given annually to the most outstanding defenseman in NCAA Division I men's lacrosse.

== Professional life ==
Schmeisser was an attorney by trade and never accepted payment for his coaching. After earning his undergraduate degree, he worked first as a bank clerk and then as a law clerk. His next job was as an attorney for the Willis and Homer firm. Later in his career, he ran his own law firm and was a member of the American Bar Association, the Maryland State Bar Association, and the Bar Association of Baltimore City. Schmeisser also served sixteen years on the board of directors of the YMCA's Baltimore Branch and as president from 1938 to 1941.

He married Isabel Wooldrige, with whom he had two children, a son and a daughter. Schmeisser died on July 1, 1941, at Union Memorial Hospital in Baltimore after a month-long illness.
