= California Boatyards =

Boatyard in Pennsylvania, United States

- Location within Pennsylvania
- 40.0681°N 79.88921°W
- Location: California Area Public Library; Wood Street; California, Pennsylvania

The California Boatyards was a boatyard in California, Pennsylvania, along the Monongahela River.

From the beginning on the California, Pennsylvania, in the 1780s, California was the site of logging and had sawmills. The sawmills were later used to support the shipbuilding industry. The boatyards, which were active from 1852 to 1879, were best known for the construction of steamboats used for western trade along the Ohio River. During the active period, 131 boats were built, with 74 in the 1850s alone. The boatyards ceased operation in 1879 when the Pittsburgh, Virginia and Charleston Railway acquired the riverside for a right-of-way.

On June 18, 1994, the Pennsylvania Historical and Museum Commission erected a historical marker at the California Area Public Library, a former railroad passenger station near the former location of the boatyards.

The marker was sponsored by the Monongahela River Bluffs Association.
