= Andrew Combs (lacrosse) =

American lacrosse player

Personal information
- Nickname: Buggs
- Born: December 31, 1977 (age 48) Towson, Maryland, U.S.
- Height: 5 ft 10 in (178 cm)
- Weight: 175 lb (79 kg; 12 st 7 lb)

Sport
- Position: Attack
- NLL draft: 78th overall, 2001; Philadelphia Wings
- MLL team Former teams: Washington Bayhawks; Los Angeles Riptide; Baltimore Bayhawks; Rochester Rattlers
- NCAA team: University of Maryland
- Pro career: 2003–

Andrew 'Buggs' Combs (born December 31, 1977) is an American former professional lacrosse player. He attended the University of Maryland, and played with the Chesapeake Bayhawks of the Major League Lacrosse. Combs is currently a head lacrosse coach for the API Diamondbacks Lacrosse Club in Gambrills, Maryland for Athletic Performance Incorporated. Combs was the Offensive Coordinator, under head coach Tony Seaman, for the Towson University Men's Lacrosse team.

== Professional career ==
2007: Began the season with the Los Angeles Riptide where he played in three games and recorded 13 goals and 1 assist. Traded to the Washington Bayhawks and played in seven games at attack in which he scored 9 goals and 1 assist for 10 points. Finished the season with 22 total goals.

2006: Was traded to the Riptide from the Rochester Rattlers. Was named the Offensive Player of the Week during weeks 9 and 11. Was named the Bud Light Game MVP on July 23. Played in 12 games and scored in 11, tallying 27 goals and 3 assists for 30 points while picking up 9 ground balls.

2005: Played in 6 games for the Rochester Rattlers, scoring in all 6 games. Tallied 17 goals and had 3 assists for 20 points while recording 7 ground balls. Was named the Major League Lacrosse Most Improved Player of the Year Award. and named the Offensive Player of the Week in week 9.

2004: Played two games for the Baltimore Bayhawks, recording 4 ground balls and 4 shots.

2003: Played in 7 games as a rookie for the Baltimore Bayhawks. Tallied 8 goals and 1 assist for 9 points while picking up 9 ground balls.

Combs also plays lacrosse for the storied amateur Mount Washington Lacrosse Club.

== College career ==
Combs played college lacrosse at the University of Maryland becoming the second Terrapin player ever to score 50 goals in a single season during his senior year. He earned National Player of the Week, first team All-ACC, and second team All-American honors during his senior season in which he scored 56 total points. He led the ACC in goals per game average with 3.13 per game. He’s currently ranked 15th all time on the Terrapins career goals list with 87.
