= Mount Washington Lacrosse Club =

Amateur field lacrosse club based in Baltimore, Maryland, US

The Mount Washington Lacrosse Club is an amateur field lacrosse club based in Baltimore, Maryland. As one of the most successful and well-known lacrosse clubs in history, at one point it dominated the sport at both the collegiate and club level. The team is sometimes referred to by the nickname of the "Wolfpack" or "Mounties". In 1960, Sports Illustrated called Mount Washington "one of the most successful athletic dynasties in history". The home field is Norris Field, located on Kelly Avenue in Mount Washington, Baltimore. It has been shared with the all-girls Bryn Mawr School since 1999.

== History ==
The Mount Washington Club was founded in 1904, named for the affluent suburb of Baltimore City in which it is located. Johns Hopkins coach Bill Schmeisser was instrumental in the establishment of the club. In 1906, the club abandoned other sports in order to concentrate on lacrosse. The club supported itself through home game gate receipts, which in 1969 was about $2.50 per ticket for the popular game against Johns Hopkins. Mount Washington's style of play focused on finesse and a slow-down tempo in order to counter the youth and athleticism of opposing collegiate teams.

Record keeping was somewhat lackadaisical in the club's early days but, according to Sports Illustrated, the team's record from 1925 to 1969 stood at 358–31–3. From 1959 to 1969, Mount Washington compiled a 94–8 record against top college and club competition.

Mount Washington has played as a member of the United States Club Lacrosse Association (USCLA, merged into American Lacrosse League in 2007) since its establishment in 1960, and has won 13 USCLA championships. In 1967, Mount Washington represented the United States in the inaugural World Lacrosse Championship, which it won by defeating the teams from Australia, England, and Canada. During the 1960s, college lacrosse was dominated by the Naval Academy, which won eight consecutive USILA championships during the decade. From 1960 to 1966, Mount Washington accounted for three of Navy's six losses.

In 1962, Mount Washington played a televised box lacrosse competition against a Washington, D.C. club. In sudden death overtime, the referee inadvertently resumed the game during a television timeout. Mount Washington scored to win the game, but a television official demanded a restart for the cameras, arguing that the box lacrosse league had been established in order to be televised. Despite the club's protests, the officiating staff complied, and Mount Washington scored to win the game a second time.

In the early 1970s, Mount Washington was displaced as perennial club champions by the Long Island Athletic Club (now the Hofstra Lacrosse Club), but returned to win three consecutive USCLA titles from 1975 to 1977.

In 1999, due to financial difficulties, the club sold Norris Field to the Bryn Mawr School girls preparatory school for $250,000. Mount Washington and Bryn Mawr agreed to a 20-year contract to share the facilities, with the club having access at night for practice and on weekends for games. In 2017, Bryn Mawr sold Norris Field to Coppermine Recreational Facilities.

== Players ==
The Mount Washington Club has been amateur throughout its history, with practices and games coming in the spare time of its players. Many of them have been professional businessmen, bankers, lawyers, and stockbrokers. These have included numerous college All-Americans, Lacrosse Hall of Fame inductees, and head coaches.

Some of the more accomplished Mount Washington members have been:

- James "Ace" Adams, Johns Hopkins†
- Frederick A. Allner Jr., Princeton†
- Gordon A. Armstrong, Johns Hopkins†
- Henry Fenimore Baker, Swarthmore†
- Ernest J. Betz, Maryland†
- Avery F. Blake Sr., Swarthmore†
- John Blatchley, Towson
- Hugh “World Wide” Boyle, Ohio Wesleyan
- Paul Cantabene, Loyola†
- Andrew "Buggs" Combs, Maryland
- Gary Clipp, UMBC‡
- Joseph W. Cowan, Johns Hopkins†
- Agostino M. DiMaggio, Washington College†
- Frederick H. Eisenbrandt Jr., Duke†
- William L. Fewster, Johns Hopkins†
- L. Myrton Gaines Jr., Princeton†
- Gary Gait, Syracuse†
- Paul Gait, Syracuse†
- Melvin R. Greene Jr., Johns Hopkins†
- Gregory T. Gunning, Johns Hopkins
- Lorne Randolf Guild, Johns Hopkins†
- Frederic M. Hewitt, Maryland†
- William U. Hooper Jr., Virginia†
- William Harkinson Hudgins, Johns Hopkins†
- Jim Kappler, Maryland‡
- Benjamin H. Kaestner III, Johns Hopkins†
- Henry Benjamin Kaestner Jr., Johns Hopkins†
- Thomas N. Keigler, Washington & Lee†‡
- Andrew M. Kirkpatrick, St. John's College†
- John C. Knipp, Johns Hopkins†
- Richard M. Kowalchuk, Johns Hopkins†‡
- Alvin B. Krongard, Princeton†‡
- Phil Lamb, Swarthmore†
- F. Gibbs LaMotte†
- John D. Lang, Johns Hopkins†
- Jim "Hy" Levasseur, Virginia‡
- James C. Lewis, Navy†
- Skip Lichtfuss, Washington & Lee†‡
- Darren Lowe, Brown University
- A. Arlyn Marshall, Johns Hopkins†
- Jim McDonald, Washington & Lee †
- Robert G. Merrick Jr., Yale†‡
- Mark Millon, UMass†‡
- Butch Marino, Delaware‡
- Mike Morrill, Johns Hopkins
- Walter O. "Kid" Norris, St. John's College†
- Ray Van Orman, Cornell, (coach)†
- Sifford Pearre, Johns Hopkins†
- Dave Pietramala, Johns Hopkins‡
- Robert B. Pool, St. John's College†
- Quint Kessenich, Johns Hopkins
- Karl "Rip" Rippelmeyer, Navy†
- Milton R. Roberts, Johns Hopkins†
- Bill Schmeisser, Johns Hopkins†
- Al Seivold, Johns Hopkins‡
- Joseph Seivold Jr., Washington College†‡
- Rob Shek, Towson‡
- Fred B. Smith Jr., Johns Hopkins†
- Steven B. Stenersen, North Carolina†
- Thomas S. Strobhar, Johns Hopkins†
- Edward M. Stuart, Johns Hopkins†
- Fritz R. Stude, Johns Hopkins†
- James Brooks Sweet, U Mass Amherst†‡
- Ferris Thomsen, St. John's College†
- John C. Tolson, Johns Hopkins†
- F. Morris Touchstone, Army†
- Reginald V. Truitt, Maryland†
- John Tucker, Johns Hopkins
- Doug Turnbull, Johns Hopkins†
- Jack Turnbull, Johns Hopkins†
- W. Brooke Tunstall, Johns Hopkins†
- Dick Watts, Johns Hopkins†
- Charles E. Wicker, Maryland†
- Ralph N. Willis, Princeton†
- William C. Wylie, Maryland†
- Church Yearley, Johns Hopkins†

† = National Lacrosse Hall of Fame inductee
‡ = U.S. national team player

== Championships ==
- 1960 USCLA championship
- 1962 USCLA championship
- 1964 USCLA championship
- 1965 USCLA championship
- 1966 USCLA championship
- 1967 World Lacrosse Championship, representing the United States
- 1967 USCLA championship
- 1975 USCLA championship
- 1976 USCLA championship
- 1977 USCLA championship
- 1990 USCLA championship
- 1991 USCLA championship
- 1993 USCLA championship
- 1995 USCLA championship
