= Old Main (California University of Pennsylvania) =

- Old Main, PennWest California
- U.S. National Register of Historic Places
- Washington County History & Landmarks Foundation Landmark
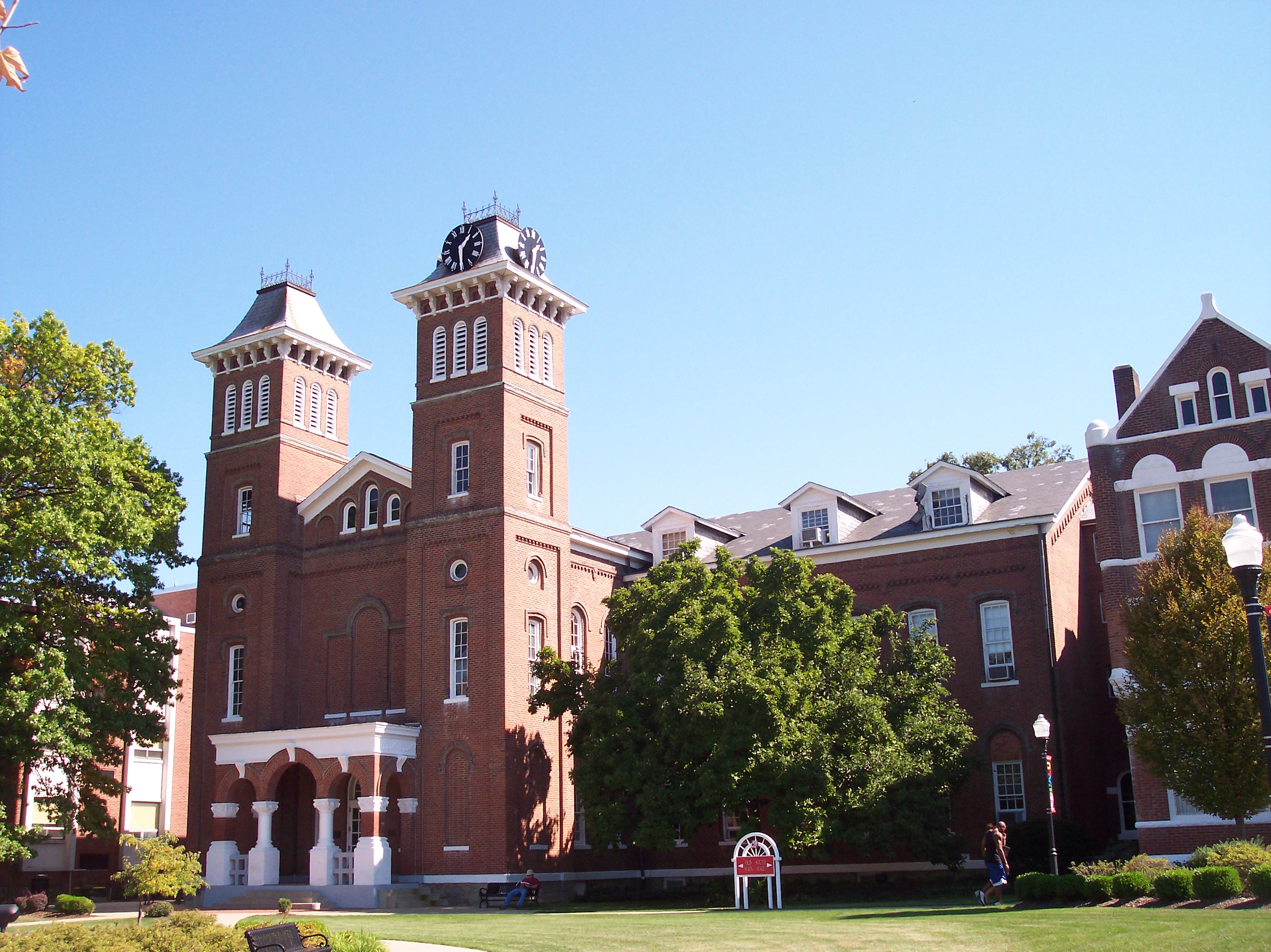

- Location within Pennsylvania Location within the United States
- Location: PennWest California, California, Pennsylvania
- Coordinates: 40°3′57″N 79°53′8″W
- Area: 0.3 acres (0.12 ha)
- Built: 1868
- Architect: Barr & Moser
- Architectural style: Romanesque
- NRHP reference No.: 74001806
- Added to NRHP: May 02, 1974

Old Main is a historic building on the campus of Pennsylvania Western University California (known before July 2022 as California University of Pennsylvania) in California, Pennsylvania.

It is designated as a historic public landmark by the Washington County History & Landmarks Foundation.
