= Molly Fleming House =

Historic house in Pennsylvania, United States

- U.S. National Register of Historic Places
- Washington County History & Landmarks Foundation Landmark
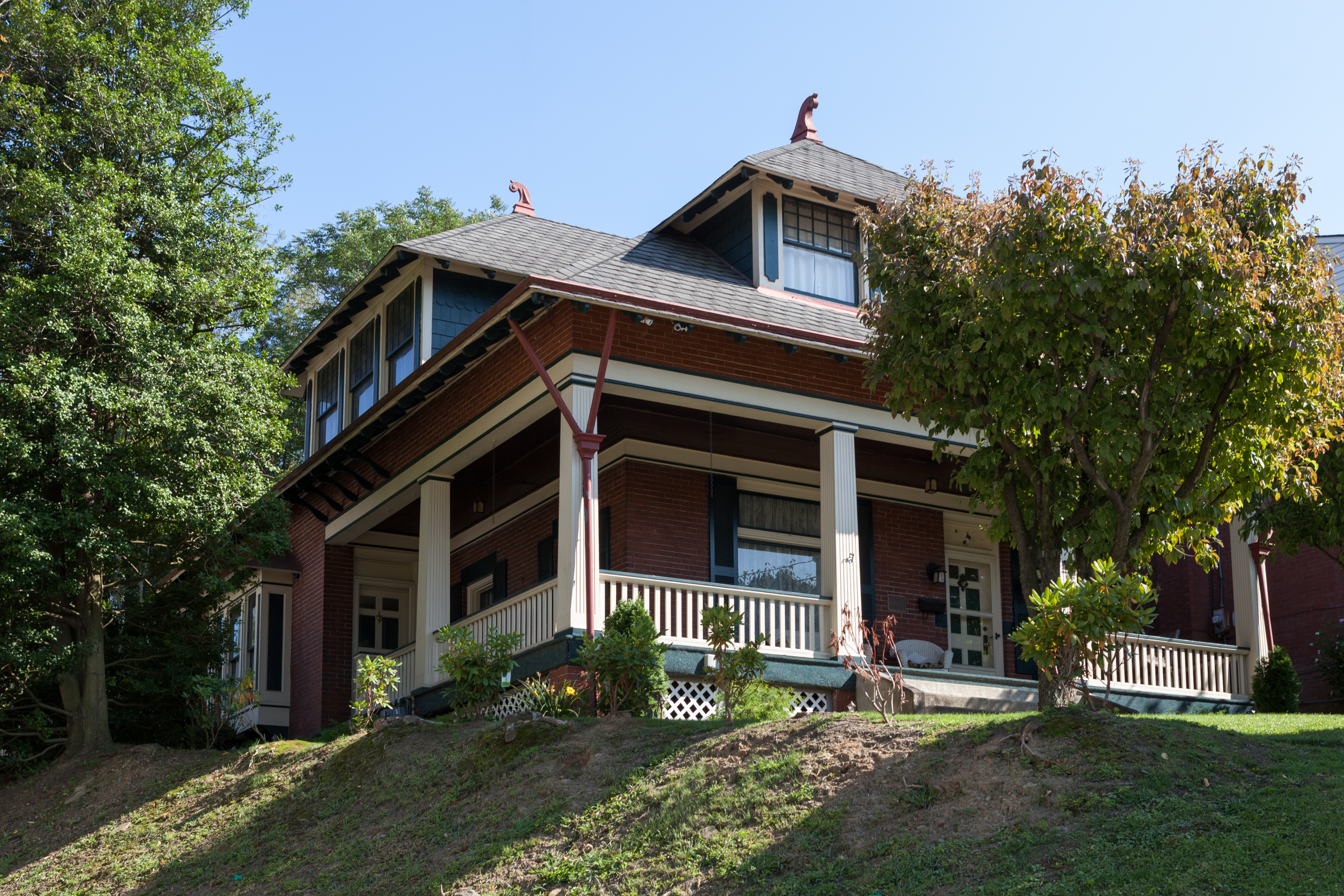
- Molly Fleming House in August 2014

- Location within Pennsylvania Location within the United States
- Location: 616 Wood St., California, Pennsylvania
- Coordinates: 40°3′48.4″N 79°53′26.3″W
- Area: less than one acre
- Built: 1912
- Architectural style: Queen Anne, Bungalow/Craftsman, Colonial Revival
- NRHP reference No.: 97000519
- Added to NRHP: May 30, 1997

Molly Fleming House is a historic building in California, Pennsylvania.

It is designated as a historic residential landmark/farmstead by the Washington County History & Landmarks Foundation.
