= Jack Turnbull (lacrosse) =

American lacrosse player

Personal information
- Born: June 30, 1910 Baltimore, Maryland, U.S.
- Died: October 20, 1944 (aged 34) Belgium

Sport
- Position: Attack, Out Home
- USILA team: Johns Hopkins Blue Jays

Career highlights
- 1932 United States Intercollegiate Lacrosse Association Champions; 1930 USILA - First Team All-American; 1931 USILA - First Team All-American; 1932 USILA - First Team All-American

John Iglehart Turnbull (June 30, 1910 – October 20, 1944) was an American lacrosse player and 1965 inductee into the National Lacrosse Hall of Fame. He lends his name to the Jack Turnbull Award, given to the nation's best collegiate attackman.

== Biography ==
Jack Turnbull was born on June 30, 1910, in Baltimore, Maryland. He attended Baltimore Polytechnic Institute (Poly), where he was class president his senior year. He was the captain of Poly's 1926 lacrosse team and played on the football and basketball teams as well. At the age of 18, he performed at the playoffs for the 1928 Olympic games.

Turnbull attended Johns Hopkins University, where he played on the 1932 team. He graduated from Hopkins with a bachelor's degree in engineering after only three years. Turnbull was named an All-American each of his 3 years on the Johns Hopkins Blue Jays men's lacrosse team and is widely regarded as one of the best to ever play the game. At Hopkins, Turnbull also played football and helped establish an ice hockey team.

He was captain of the U.S. lacrosse team during the 1932 Summer Olympics and remained active in sports as a member of the Mount Washington Lacrosse Club. Four years later, he was a member of the U.S. field hockey team at the 1936 Summer Olympics in Berlin, during which he met Adolf Hitler.

Turnbull enlisted in the Maryland National Guard as an aviation cadet and was commissioned as a second lieutenant on June 24, 1940. He was mobilized along with the rest of the Maryland National Guard in February 1941, just prior to the U.S. entry into World War II. During the war he quickly rose in rank, and by 1944 he was a lieutenant colonel. On October 20, 1944, he died of injuries sustained two days earlier, when his B-24 crashed in Belgium after a mid-air collision while returning from a bombing run over Germany.

Johns Hopkins University lacrosse stats*
Season	GP	G	A	Pts	PPG
1930	--	--	--	--	--
1931	--	--	--	--	--
1932	11	13	7	20	--
Totals	--	--	--	--	--

- Stats are incomplete

== See also ==
- National Lacrosse Hall of Fame
- Johns Hopkins Blue Jays men's lacrosse
