= California Area Public Library =

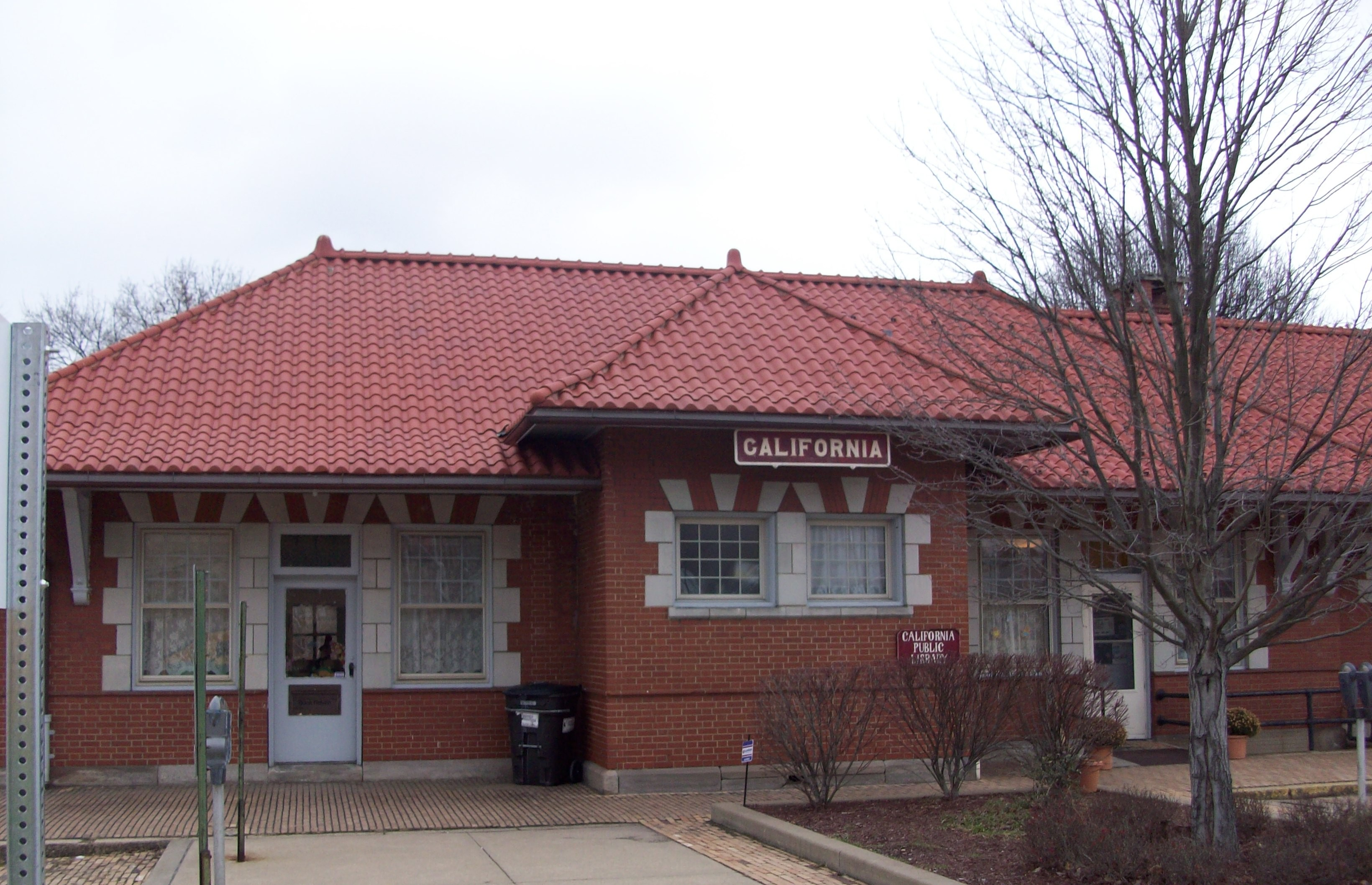
- 40°4′6″N 79°53′20.5″W
- Location: California, Pennsylvania
- Type: Public library
- Established: 1935
- Branch of: Washington County Library System

Collection
- Size: 15,242 items (2008)

Access and use
- Circulation: 10,042 (2008)
- Population served: 10,640 (2018)
- Members: 1,792 (2008)

Other information
- Director: Claudia L. Bennett (2019)
- Website: www.calpublib.org

- Pennsylvania Railroad Passenger Station
- U.S. National Register of Historic Places
- Washington County History & Landmarks Foundation Landmark
- Built: 1910
- NRHP reference No.: 79002349
- Added to NRHP: June 19, 1979

The California Area Public Library is the public library serving California, Pennsylvania, and is a branch of the Washington County Library System. The library is located in the former Pennsylvania Railroad Passenger Station, which was listed on the National Register of Historic Places in 1979.

It is designated as a historic public landmark by the Washington County History & Landmarks Foundation.

On June 18, 1994, the Pennsylvania Historical and Museum Commission erected a historical marker at the California Area Public Library noting the importance of the California Boatyards.

== History ==
The building the library is located in was built in 1910 by the Pennsylvania Railroad to replace an older depot that was constructed in 1885.

The California Area Public Library was founded in 1935, but moved to its current location in the former train station on May 24, 1958. The library was closed in 1965 because of the lack of financial support. A year after the library building was listed on the National Register of Historic Places on June 19, 1979, the Washington County Library System was formed, which was joined by the California Area Public Library.

== See also ==
- National Register of Historic Places listings in Washington County, Pennsylvania

Preceding station	Pennsylvania Railroad	Following station
West Brownsville Junction toward Brownsville	Monongahela Division	Coal Centre toward Pittsburgh
