= Ray Van Orman =

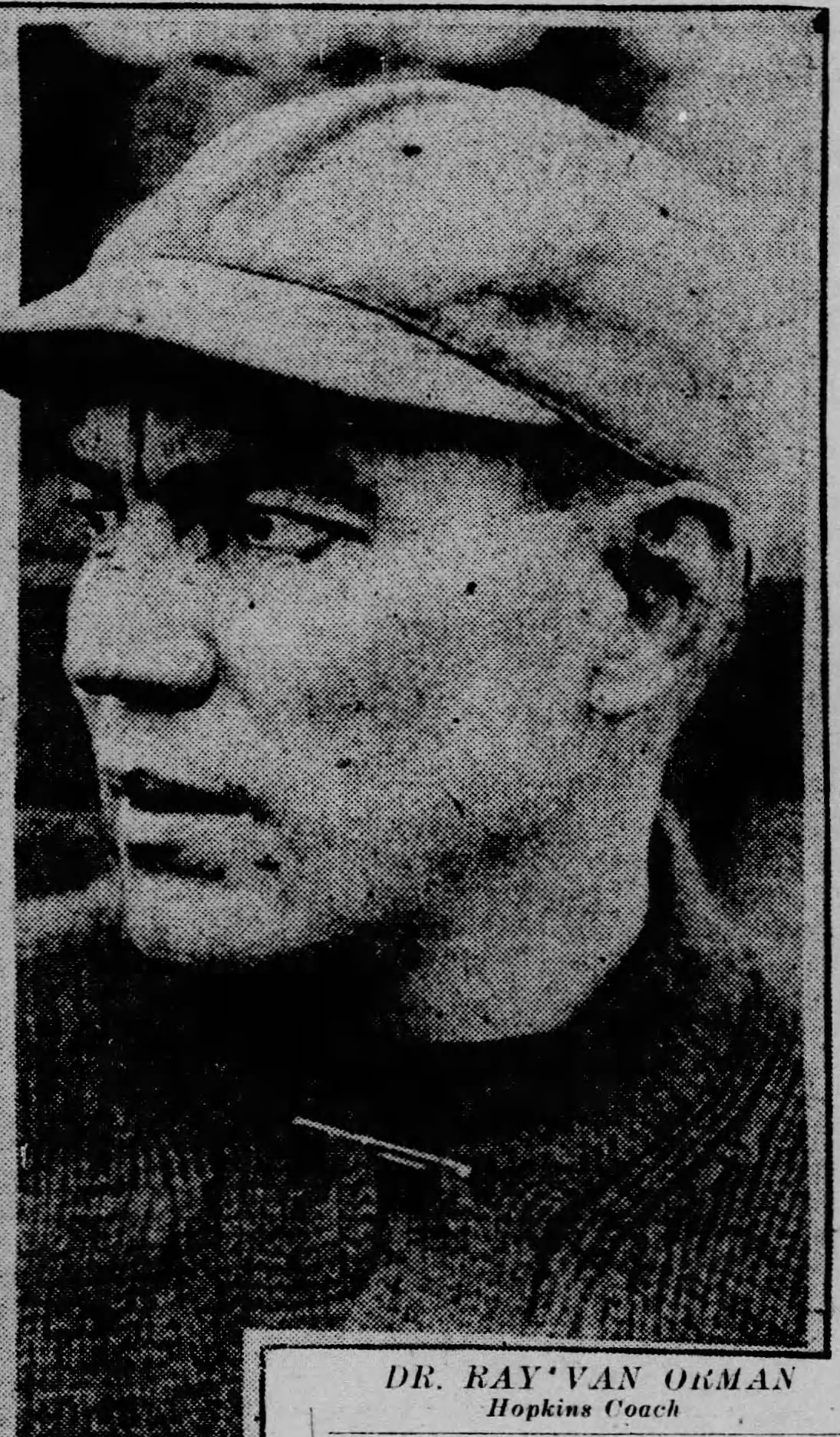
- Van Orman in 1925

Biographical details
- Born: January 25, 1884; Ithaca, New York, U.S.
- Died: May 24, 1954 (aged 70); Ithaca, New York, U.S.

Playing career

Football
- 1904–1906: Cornell
- Position: End

Coaching career (HC unless noted)

Football
- 1912–1919: Cornell (assistant)
- 1920–1935: Johns Hopkins
- 1936–1939: Cornell (assistant)

Lacrosse
- 1926–1934: Johns Hopkins
- 1935: Mount Washington L.C.
- 1940–1949: Cornell

Administrative career (AD unless noted)
- 1920–1935: Johns Hopkins

Head coaching record
- Overall: 60–64–7 (college football); 95–56 (college lacrosse)

Accomplishments and honors

Championships
- 1 Maryland state football (1921); 3 USILL (1926–1928); 3 USILA (1932–1934)

Ray Van Orman (January 25, 1884 – May 24, 1954) was an American veterinarian and college football and lacrosse coach. He served as the head lacrosse and football coach at Johns Hopkins University, from 1920 to 1935 and 1926 to 1935 respectively, and the head lacrosse coach at Cornell University from 1940 to 1949. Van Orman was inducted into the National Lacrosse Hall of Fame in 1992.

== Early life ==
Van Orman attended Ithaca High School in upstate New York, where he played football and was a team captain. He attended college at Cornell University, where he continued his football career as an end under head coach Glenn "Pop" Warner from 1904 to 1906. During his freshman year in 1904, he was elected class president. He served as the football team captain in 1906. Van Orman was expelled from the university in March 1906 by the student conduct committee for allegedly "cribbing" during a veterinary surgery examination. He later returned to the school and graduated with a doctorate of veterinary medicine in 1908.

== Coaching career ==
In 1912, Van Orman returned to his alma mater to serve on the Cornell football staff under head coach A. H. Sharpe. He remained in that position until 1920, when he left to become head football coach and athletic director at Johns Hopkins University in Baltimore, Maryland. Van Orman worked in those roles through 1935. In 1933, The Sunday Spartanburg Herald-Journal ran a story on his invention of a "scrimmage machine". The contraption was a large wooden triangular frame from which dummies filled with sand or sawdust were arranged in the formation used by the opposing team. As a head football coach, he compiled a 60–64–7 record. Despite never having seen a game of lacrosse before, he became the coach of the Johns Hopkins team in 1926. In 1928 and 1932, his teams won tournaments to represent the United States in the Olympic Games. During his tenure as Hopkins lacrosse coach from 1926 to 1934, Van Orman's teams amassed a 71–11 record and captured six national championships.

In 1935, the Johns Hopkins University administration began a policy to "de-emphasize" football, and Van Orman left to coach the highly successful amateur Mount Washington Lacrosse Club. In February, he was offered the position as head coach of the Yale University lacrosse team, but that ultimately fell through. The following year, he returned to Cornell as an assistant football coach. From 1940 to 1949, Van Orman served as the head coach of the Cornell lacrosse team and amassed a 24–45 record.

Van Orman died of a heart attack on May 24, 1954, in Ithaca, New York, at the age of 71. The Cornell University Athletic Hall of Fame posthumously inducted him in 1982. He was inducted into the National Lacrosse Hall of Fame as a player in 1992.
