= Q.T.V. =

Defunct US national fraternity

- Founded: May 12, 1869; 157 years ago Massachusetts Agricultural College
- Type: Social
- Affiliation: Independent
- Status: Defunct
- Defunct date: 1976
- Scope: Regional (New England)
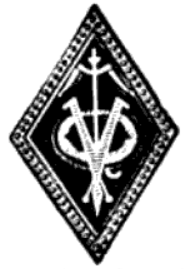
- Member badge
- Colors: White and Brown
- Flower: White carnation
- Publication: QTV Alumni Bulletin
- Chapters: 6
- Headquarters: United States

Q.T.V. is a dormant national fraternity that was founded in 1869 at Massachusetts Agricultural College, incorporating in 1890. Its last chapter ceased activity in 1976.

== History ==
Q.T.V. was the pioneer fraternity on the campus of Massachusetts Agricultural College, now the University of Massachusetts Amherst, founded on May 12, 1869. It is one of very few Latin-named fraternities, and the only one to flirt with national aims. References indicate that fraternal inquiries from emerging groups at "state schools" were met with skepticism by the established national fraternities, even those close by. This may have been the impetus for formation of the new organization, it coming just two years after the foundation of the school. Soon after, several other Latin named fraternities, all short lived, would emerge, both on the UMass campus (D.G.K., also in 1869 and C.S.C. in 1879 (Note: The C.S.C. was the Campus Shakespeare Club, which would eventually become a chapter of Alpha Sigma Phi.)) and at the University of Maine (the E.C. Society in 1875, followed by K.K.F. in 1884 and S.I.U. in 1889). The "Latin moment" fizzled; most of these soon would opt to become chapters of other Greek-named national fraternities before launching themselves beyond local status.

Q.T.V. was able to expand nationally over the next two decades, but lost chapters seeking firmer footing as "Greek Named" organizations.

Q.T.V. eventually disbanded as a national fraternity in the 20th century, with its four of its six chapters becoming associated with other Greek life organizations. After 1901, only the mother chapter remained, operating as a local fraternity at UMass until 1976, surpassing the century mark in age. Its last mention in the Index yearbook were in senior bios in the late 1960s.

== Symbols ==
The colors of the fraternity were White and Brown. Its flower was the white carnation. The surviving UMass chapter published The QTV Alumni Bulletin for many years.

== Chapters ==
These were the chapters of Q.T.V.

Chapter	Informal name	Charter date and range	Institution	Location	Status	Ref.
Alpha	Amherst	May 12, 1869 – 1976	Massachusetts Agricultural College	Amherst, Massachusetts	Inactive	
Beta	Orono	February 28, 1874 – October 24, 1899	University of Maine	Orono, Maine	Withdrew (ΦΓΔ)	(Note: The Orono chapter appears to have formed as a colony. Upon withdrawal from Q.T.V. it became the Omega Mu chapter of Phi Gamma Delta.)
Gamma	Granite	1881–1901	University of New Hampshire	Durham, New Hampshire	Withdrew (ΚΣ)	(Note: The Granite chapter appears to have formed as a colony. Upon withdrawal from Q.T.V. it became the Beta-Kappa chapter of Kappa Sigma.)
Delta	Keystone	1885–1890	Pennsylvania State University	University Park, Pennsylvania	Withdrew (ΦΚΣ)	(Note: An errant reference notes this chapter went to ΚΣ, but Baird's Archive clarifies it went to ΦΚΣ. The latter seems correct because the 1890 date matches what would have been a switch of loyalties after debate, with uninterrupted operation; Penn State's ΚΣ chapter came about two years later, what would have been a long stretch of dormancy, where no noted predecessor is listed in Baird's.) (Note: The Keystone chapter appears to have formed as a colony. Upon withdrawal from Q.T.V. it became the Psi chapter of Phi Kappa Sigma.)
Epsilon	Cornell	November 1, 1888 – 1890	Cornell University	Ithaca, New York	Inactive	
Zeta	Worcester	1886-1891	Worcester Polytechnic Institute	Worcester, Massachusetts	Withdrew (ΦΓΔ)	(Note: The Worcester chapter appears to have formed as a colony. Upon withdrawal from Q.T.V. it became the Pi Iota chapter of Phi Gamma Delta.)
