= California, Pennsylvania =

Borough in Pennsylvania, US

- Borough
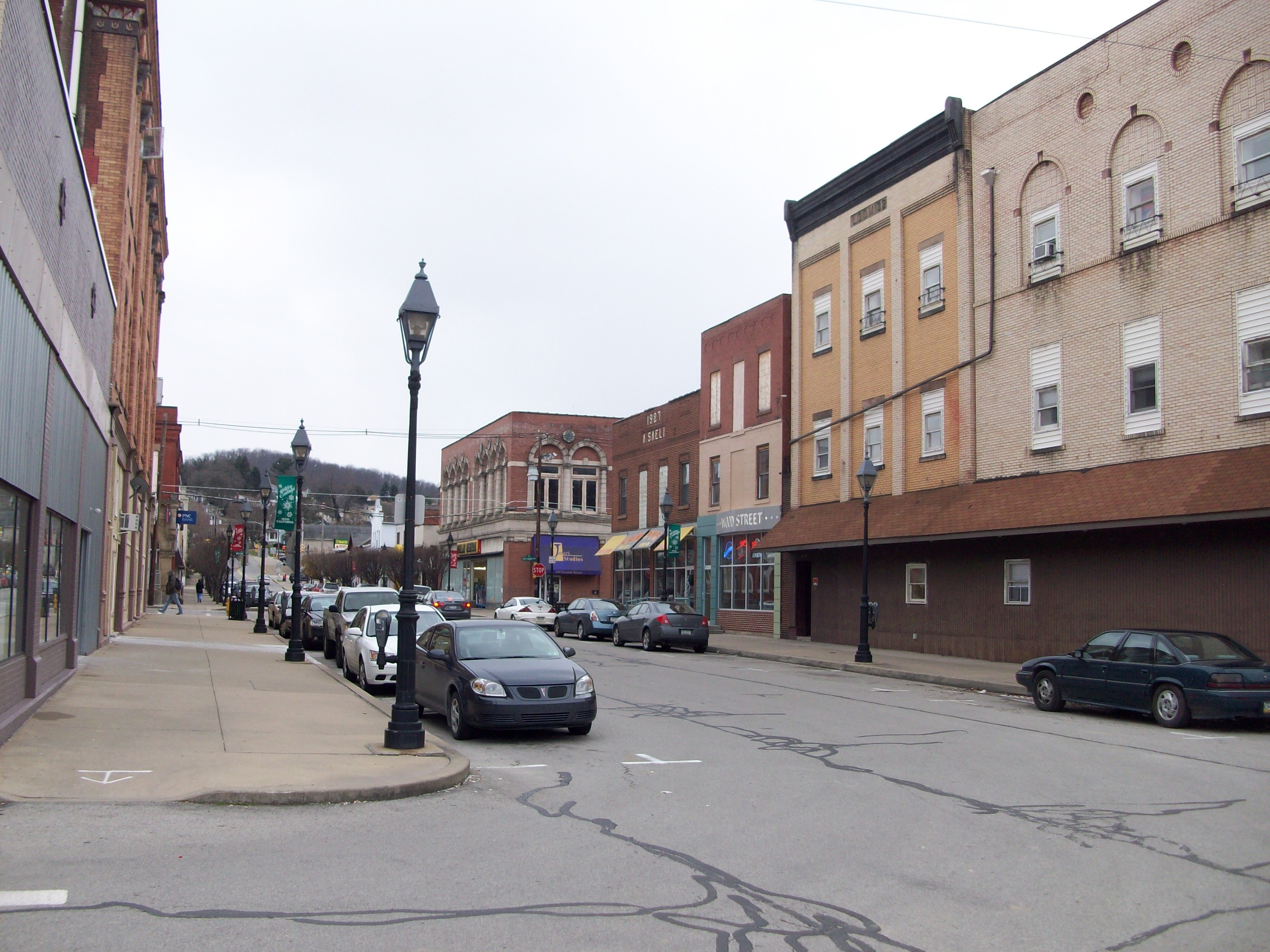
- Downtown California
- Etymology: U.S. state of California
- Location of California in Washington County, Pennsylvania.

- Location within Pennsylvania Location within the United States
- Coordinates: 40°3′55″N 79°53′50″W
- Country: United States
- State: Pennsylvania
- County: Washington
- Established: 1849

Government
  - Mayor: Frank Stetar

Area
  - Total: 11.23 sq mi (29.09 km^{2})
  - Land: 11.01 sq mi (28.52 km^{2})
  - Water: 0.22 sq mi (0.57 km^{2})

Population (2020)
  - Total: 5,362
  - Density: 487.0/sq mi (188.02/km^{2})
- Time zone: UTC-4 (EST)
  - Summer (DST): UTC-5 (EDT)
- ZIP code: 15419
- Area code: 724
- FIPS code: 42-10768
- Website: californiapa.gov

California is a borough on the Monongahela River in Washington County, Pennsylvania, United States. The population was 5,479 as of the 2020 census. It is part of the Pittsburgh metropolitan area. Founded in 1849, the borough was named for the territory of California following the gold rush. It is the home of Pennsylvania Western University, California.

== History ==
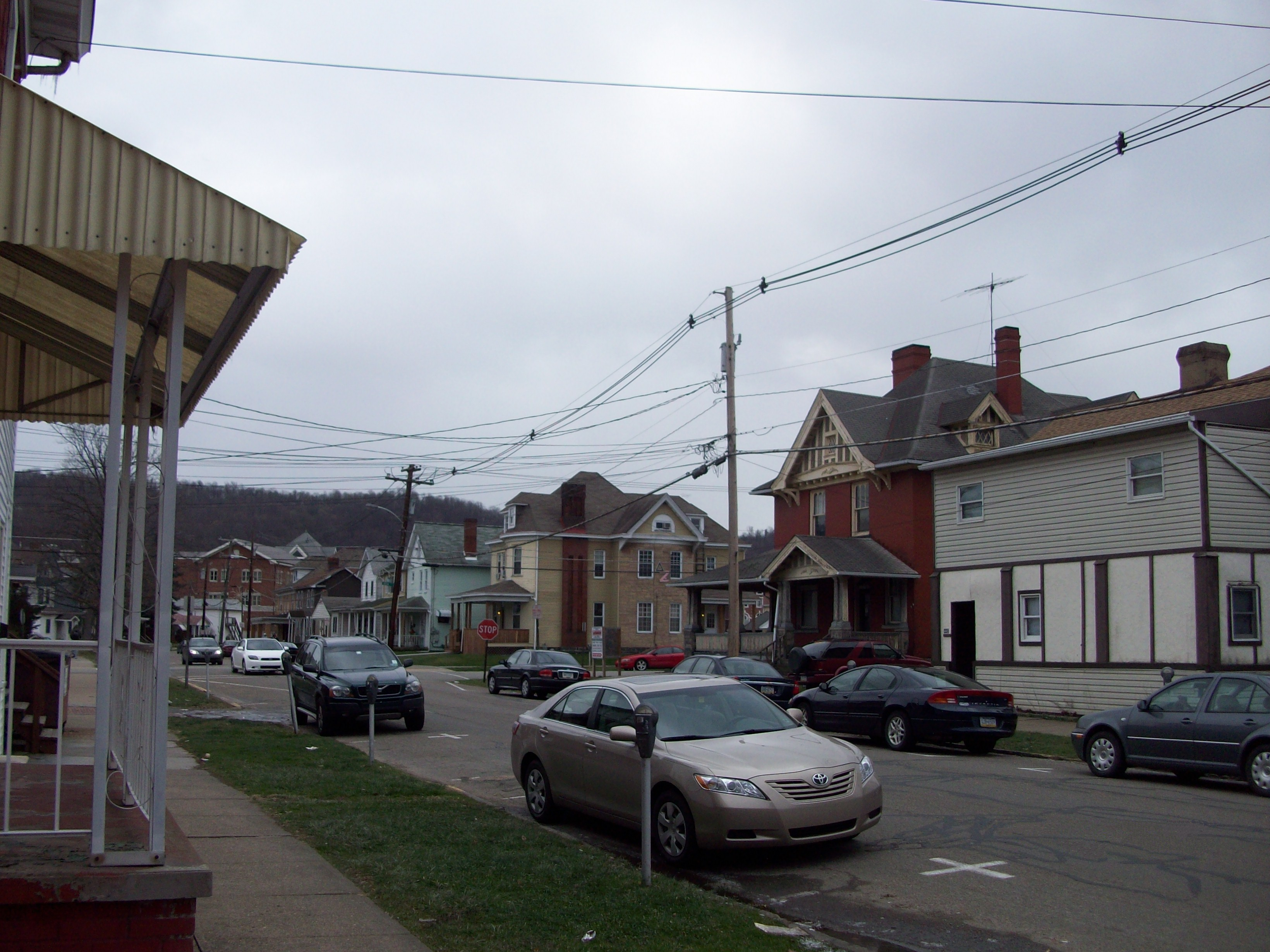
Near the university, many large early-twentieth century houses have been converted into student apartments.

Upon its founding in 1849, name suggestions included Columbia and Sagamore. Because the town's founding coincided with the California Gold Rush, it was named California to symbolize growth and prosperity. Before there were mayors in California, there were burgesses, the first of whom was Solomon Sibbitt.

East Pike Run Township merged with California Borough in 1953. The former Vigilant Mine in California once produced the largest single lump of coal in the world. California was once home to the largest soft coal mine in the world when Vesta # 4 opened in 1893. The unincorporated town of Philipsburg used to sit on land that is now occupied by PennWest California, the institution formerly known as California University of Pennsylvania before merging with Pennsylvania Western University in July 2022. This includes the Philipsburg Cemetery, which is still in use and includes a number of graves of Civil War soldiers. The first house built in California is next to the California Post Office on Second Street.

The Molly Fleming House, Jennings-Gallagher House, Malden Inn, Old Main, California State College and former Pennsylvania Railroad Passenger Station are listed on the National Register of Historic Places. The California Boatyards played an important role in building steamboats for western expansion.

The borough has had two notably young mayors—Peter Daley, who was 22 when elected in 1973, and Casey Durdines, who was 20 at his election in 2005.

== Geography ==
California is located at 40°3′55″N 79°53′50″W (40.065313, -79.897120).

According to the United States Census Bureau, the borough has a total area of 11.2 square miles (29 km^{2}), of which 11.0 square miles (28 km^{2}) is land and 0.2 square miles (0.52 km^{2}) (1.78%) is water.

California has seven land borders, including Fallowfield Township to the north, Long Branch and Elco to the northeast, Coal Center to the mideast, West Brownsville to the southeast, Centerville from the south to the west-southwest, and West Pike Run Township to the west. Across the Monongahela River in Fayette County, California runs adjacent with Newell and Jefferson Township.

== Demographics ==
Historical population
Census	Pop.	Note	%±
1860	476		—
1870	659		38.4%
1880	1,009		53.1%
1890	1,024		1.5%
1900	2,009		96.2%
1910	2,230		11.0%
1920	2,480		11.2%
1930	2,362		−4.8%
1940	2,614		10.7%
1950	2,831		8.3%
1960	5,978		111.2%
1970	6,635		11.0%
1980	5,703		−14.0%
1990	5,748		0.8%
2000	5,274		−8.2%
2010	6,795		28.8%
2020	5,362		−21.1%
2025 (est.)	4,615	▲	−13.9%

As of the census of 2000, there were 5,274 people, 1,891 households, and 867 families residing in the borough. The population density was 478.2 people per square mile (184.6 people/km^{2}). There were 2,092 housing units at an average density of 189.7 per square mile (73.2/km^{2}). The racial makeup of the borough was 93.93% White, 4.13% African American, 0.17% Native American, 0.74% Asian, 0.13% from other races, and 0.89% from two or more races. Hispanic or Latino of any race were 0.49% of the population.

There were 1,891 households, out of which 16.4% had children under the age of 18 living with them, 34.8% were married couples living together, 8.0% had a female householder with no husband present, and 54.1% were non-families. 36.6% of all households were made up of individuals, and 16.2% had someone living alone who was 65 years of age or older. The average household size was 2.15 and the average family size was 2.85.

In the borough the population was spread out, with 10.7% under the age of 18, 42.2% from 18 to 24, 17.3% from 25 to 44, 15.5% from 45 to 64, and 14.3% who were 65 years of age or older. The median age was 24 years. For every 100 females, there were 92.8 males. For every 100 females age 18 and over, there were 91.3 males.

The median income for a household in the borough was $24,628, and the median income for a family was $43,168. Males had a median income of $35,833 versus $24,537 for females. The per capita income for the borough was $14,412. About 7.3% of families and 22.3% of the population were below the poverty line, including 14.7% of those under age 18 and 8.1% of those age 65 or over.

== Education ==
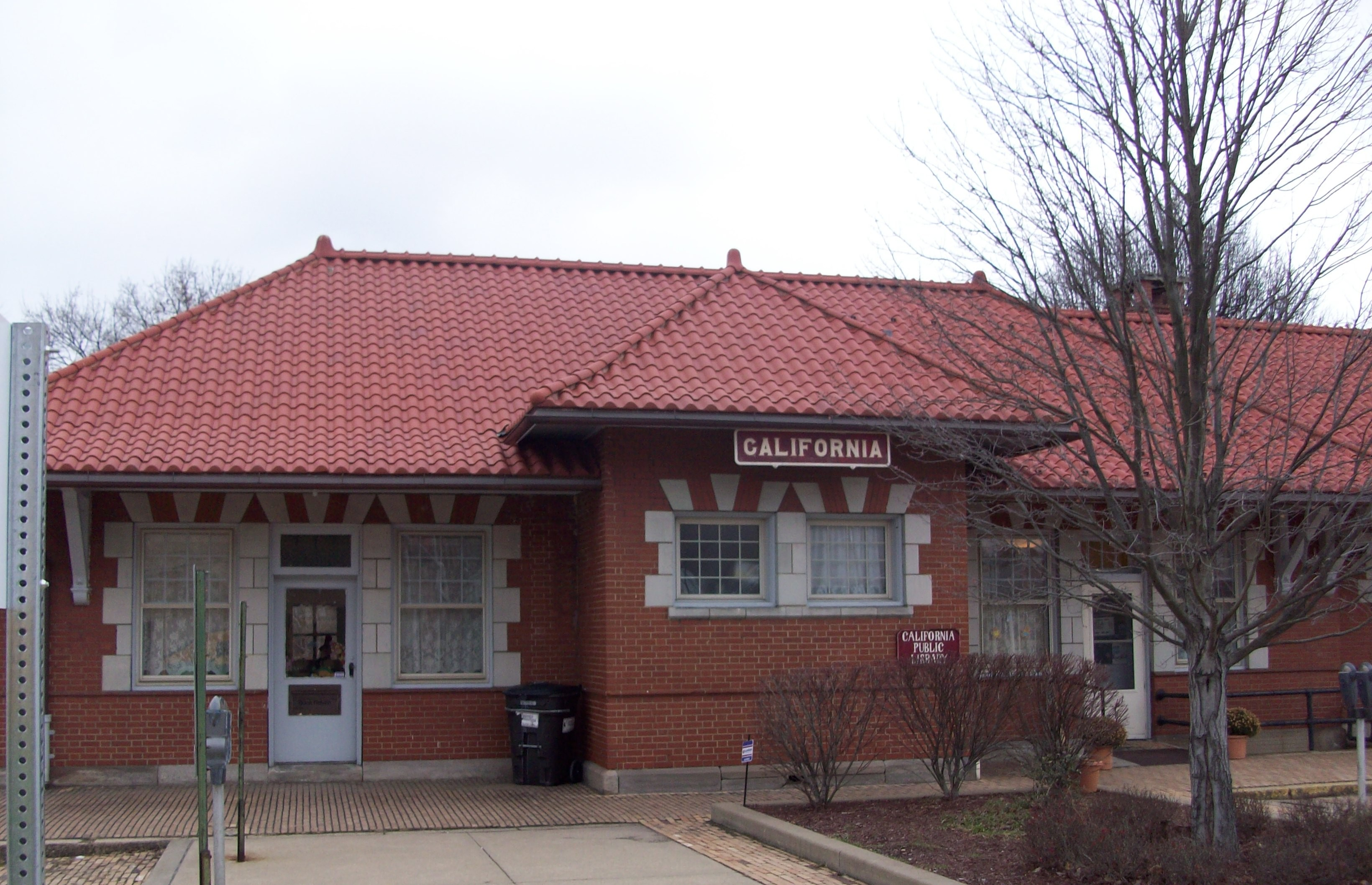
A converted train station serves as the California Public Library.

The borough is served by the public California Area School District, which includes California Area Elementary School for grades K–6 and California Area High School/Middle School for grades 7–12.

PennWest California, a campus of Pennsylvania Western University, is a public university in the borough. It has an enrollment of about 6,500 students. The school was formerly known as California University of Pennsylvania prior to July 2022, and previously in reverse chronological order as California State College, California State Teachers College, California Normal School, and Southwestern Normal School.

== Notable people ==
- Viola Liuzzo, Unitarian Universalist and civil rights activist murdered in the events of Bloody Sunday
- Joseph Yablonski, American labor leader in the United Mine Workers in the 1950s and 1960s
- Lt. Colonel Philip J. Corso, U.S. Army World War II, Korea, staff member, President Eisenhower's National Security Council
- Bruce Dal Canton, major league pitcher for the Pittsburgh Pirates, Kansas City Royals, Atlanta Braves and Chicago White Sox
- Peter Daley, California's youngest mayor at the time of his 1972 election at age 22; social studies teacher at California Junior High/Middle School 1972–79; Pennsylvania Congressman, representing the 49th District, 1983–2016
- Bert Humphries, major league pitcher for the Philadelphia Phillies, Cincinnati Reds and Chicago Cubs in the early 20th century
- Frank Jarvis, athlete and lawyer
- Don LeJohn, Major League Baseball third baseman and Minor League Baseball manager
- Paul Wyatt, Olympic silver (1924, Paris) and bronze (1928, Amsterdam) medalist in the 100m backstroke. Born in the village of Brier Hill, Pennsylvania; resident of California, Pennsylvania, as an adult.
