= Chris Hogan (finance expert) =

Personal finance expert

- Education: Georgetown College (BA); California University of Pennsylvania (MA)
- Occupations: Ex-radio show host, author, personal finance expert
- Notable work: Everyday Millionaire
- Spouse: Melissa J. Hogan (m. 1998; div. 2019)
- Website: coachhogan.com

Chris Hogan is an American author, personal finance expert, and former radio show host.

== Education ==
Hogan earned his undergraduate degree from Georgetown College and his master's degree from California University of Pennsylvania. During college he was an NAIA all-American football player.

== Career ==
Hogan started his career as a debt collector where he frequently encountered people that were struggling financially. He later joined Dave Ramsey’s company Ramsey Solutions as a financial coach. Hogan was the host of The Chris Hogan Show, he is a public speaker and best-selling author.

== Departure from Ramsey Solutions ==
On March 10, 2021, Chris Hogan announced in a video that he was no longer with the (Ramsey Solutions) company. "Recently, it’s come to light that I’ve done some things personally that are not in line with Ramsey Solutions and as a result, I’m no longer a team member at Ramsey," Hogan said in the brief video. "I’m sorry for the harm that this has caused." Hogan had admitted to having several affairs, including one with a fellow Ramsey employee, during his divorce proceedings with some discipline from the leadership. Prior to this, Hogan's wife had tried to leverage the workplace's leadership to help him, and save their marriage, but she was questioned on what her true motives were, and if she was trying to hurt the Dave Ramsey brand.

== Books authored ==
- Retire inspired: It's Not an Age; It's a Financial Number
- Everyday Millionaires: How Ordinary People Built Extraordinary Wealth – And How You Can Too
