= Sam Marchiano =

Susan Anne "Sam" Marchiano is an American television sportscaster, documentarian and activist who is adjunct faculty at the NYU Tisch Sports Institute for Sports Management, Media and Business. In addition to teaching Leagues and Governing Organizations and Leadership for Crisis Situations, Marchiano served as research chair for NYU's 2016 Social Responsibility of Sports Conference. She is a founding member of the board of directors of the Equality League, a non-profit launching in spring 2018.

Until 2015, she was the outreach director for Athlete Ally, a 501 (c)(3) tax-exempt non profit organization focused on ending homophobia and transphobia in sports by educating and motivating the athletic community to take a stand.^{[1]} She became a founding member of the Athlete Ally board of directors because allyship played a crucial role in her ability to address gender issues as female sports reporter^{[2]} She was a central figure in Major League Baseball's embrace of LGBT inclusion beginning in 2013.

Like Athlete Ally Founder Hudson Taylor, her own personal experience reflects into her LGBT advocacy.^{[3]} "Once people start to talk about the issue, and get comfortable, the acceptance grows from there", Marchiano told the Washington Blade; "You don’t go backward".^{[3]}

She thinks of her advocacy holistically: "Ending discrimination is all about respect, no matter your sexual orientation, your race, your gender or where you're from", Marchiano said.

== Journalism ==
A correspondent-reporter for FOX Sports and the MSG Network, Marchiano started her career as a sportswriter for the New York Daily News.^{[4]} Marchiano joined the News directly from Columbia University after her graduation in 1989 and covered the Islanders for two seasons. In 1991, she pursued a career in television and became an associate producer for “Inside Edition” at WYNY (Channel 5).^{[4]} Marchiano became a New York bureau producer for ESPN in 1993 and became an on-the-air reporter for MSG two years later. By 1997, she was a correspondent for FOX Sports New York and FOX Sports Net.^{[4]} She later became a reporter for mlb.com.^{[4]}

In 2002 she joined MLB.com, the official website of Major League Baseball, where she worked as a producer, reporter, and writer. She earned Emmy nominations for the MLB Original Documentary Vintage Baseball^{[5]} as well as the series Baseball's Best Moments.^{[5]} During production of Vintage Baseball, she became interested in baseball's origins and began work on Baseball Discovered, an hour-long documentary that aired on the MLB Network.^{[6]}

During the filming of Baseball Discovered in England, Marchiano and her crew discovered the William Bray diary, which historians consider one of the earliest known references to the game.^{[7]} Baseball Discovered received the Award for Baseball Excellence at the 3rd annual Baseball Film Festival at the Hall of Fame. The award recognizes the film that best captures “research, factual accuracy, historical context, and appreciation of the game.”^{[4]}

== Personal ==
Marchiano's father Sal worked for WPIX in New York City. She is a graduate of Stuyvesant High School and Columbia University. Marchiano lives in New York with husband Bryan Spillane, their son Cal and daughter Frankie from a previous marriage to Ihsan Dogramaci.
