= The Ramsey Show =

American radio-aired talk show

- Genre: Financial talk
- Country of origin: United States
- Starring: Dave Ramsey; Rachel Cruze; Dr. John Delony; George Kamel; Jade Warshaw
- Created by: Dave Ramsey
- Produced by: James Childs
- Executive producer: Blake Thompson
- Recording studio: Ramsey Solutions
- Original release: 1992 – present
- Opening theme: "Baker Street" by Gerry Rafferty
- Website: ramseysolutions.com
- Podcast: https://podcasts.apple.com/us/podcast/the-ramsey-show/id77001367

The Ramsey Show (formerly known as The Dave Ramsey Show and The Money Game) is an American self-syndicated radio program hosted by finance author Dave Ramsey and a rotating group of co-hosts, that airs Monday through Friday from 2:00–5:00 P.M. ET. It is broadcast from the headquarters of Ramsey's company, Ramsey Solutions, in Franklin, Tennessee.

Besides terrestrial radio and podcast outlets,The Ramsey Show is also available on its own channel on iHeartRadio and SiriusXM. As of 2025, The Ramsey Show is among the most-listened-to radio shows in the United States according to Talkers Magazine.

== History ==
The show began in June 1992, when Dave Ramsey was invited to appear as a guest on WTN 99.7 FM in Nashville, Tennessee, to promote his self-published book, Financial Peace. His live personal finance advice on listener call-ins proved popular with the audience.

At the time, the station was undergoing Chapter 11 bankruptcy. When the regular host who had initially brought Ramsey on the air resigned over a financial dispute, Ramsey and insurance agent Roy Matlock offered to fill the vacant time slot for free for one month, Ramsey thinking he could at least sell more copies of his book. The resulting show, The Money Game, originally featured three rotating hosts when it first aired: Ramsey, Matlock, and real estate agent Hal Wilson. Each hosted a separate hour of the show and focused on their areas of expertise with callers. Wilson exited the program very early in its run, leaving Ramsey and Matlock as hosts.

As the show grew in popularity in Nashville, Ramsey and Matlock began hosting The Money Game full-time. In 1996, Ramsey proposed national syndication. Because Matlock was a licensed insurance agent in Tennessee, insurance regulators were uneasy about Matlock being on the air nationally, so Matlock voluntarily left the show to focus on his insurance business. With Ramsey as sole host, the program was renamed The Dave Ramsey Show in 1999.

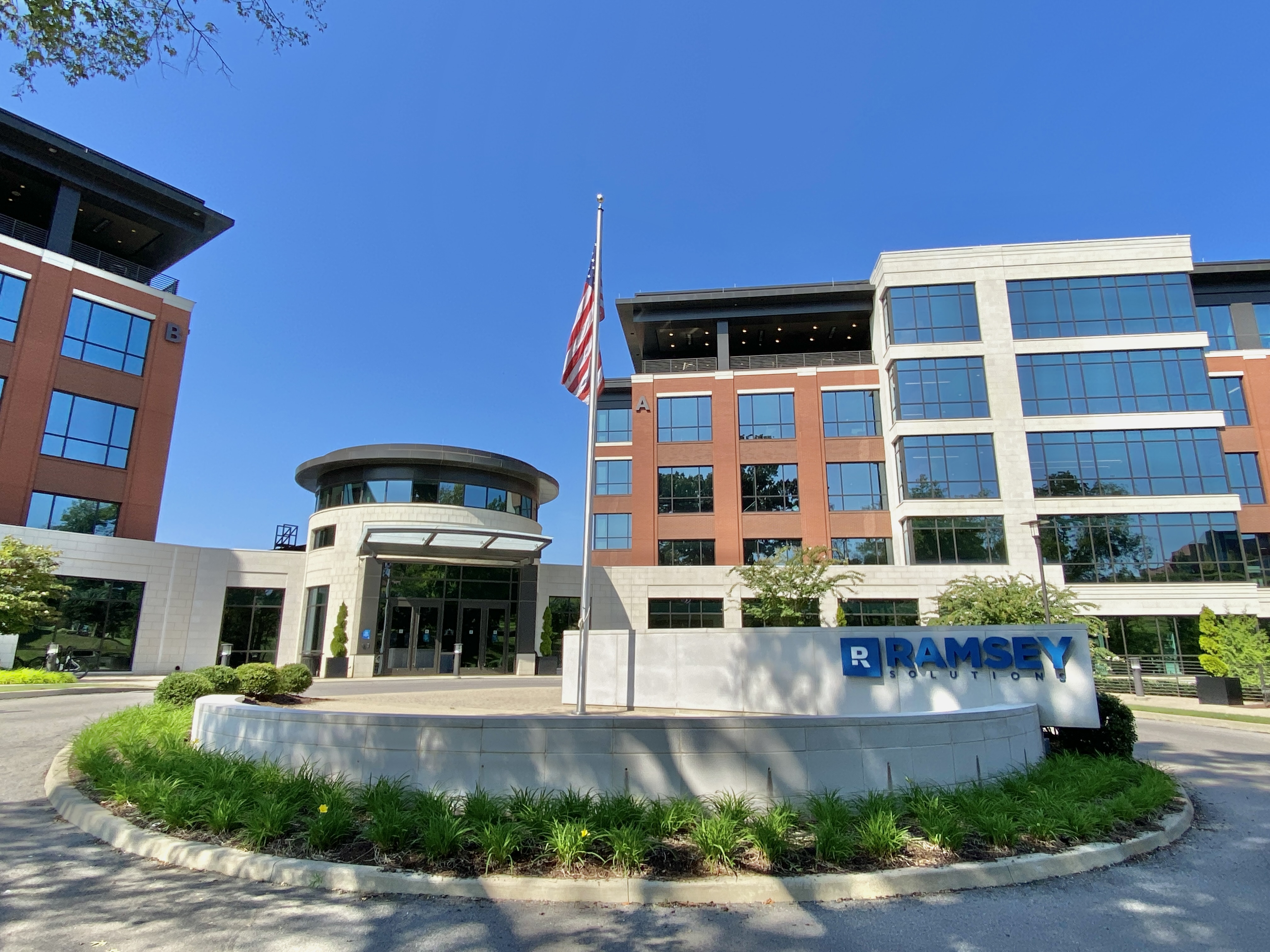
Headquarters of Ramsey Solutions, where The Ramsey Show is broadcast.

Since 1996, Ramsey has handled syndication of The Ramsey Show independently through his company, Ramsey Solutions (originally publicly known as The Lampo Group). The show now airs on over 600 stations, SiriusXM, and iHeartRadio.

In 2013, the show moved from WTN to WPRT (known as "102.5 The Game") after contract negotiations with the former station fell through. One year later, on January 1, 2014, the show moved to WLAC.

In 2020, the show was rebranded as The Ramsey Show to reflect the inclusion of multiple permanent co-hosts. In a 2023 interview, Ramsey described the change as a way to prepare the program for "generational success" beyond his own involvement. Ramsey also said that he will continue to co-host The Ramsey Show alongside the new personalities "as long as I make sense."

== Format ==
The Ramsey Show follows a call-in format where listeners seek advice on personal finance topics such as debt, saving, budgeting, and retirement. The show features a rotating cast of co-hosts each day, including Dave Ramsey, with specializations in areas such as personal finance, mental health, leadership, career coaching, and personal development.

=== Debt-free scream ===
A notable daily segment is the “debt-free scream,” in which callers or in-studio guests celebrate paying off their consumer debt by shouting the phrase on air. The tradition began in the early 2000s after a caller spontaneously shouted over the phone about paying off her debt. In a 2017 interview, Dave Ramsey described the practice as a symbolic emotional milestone for participants.

== Hosts ==
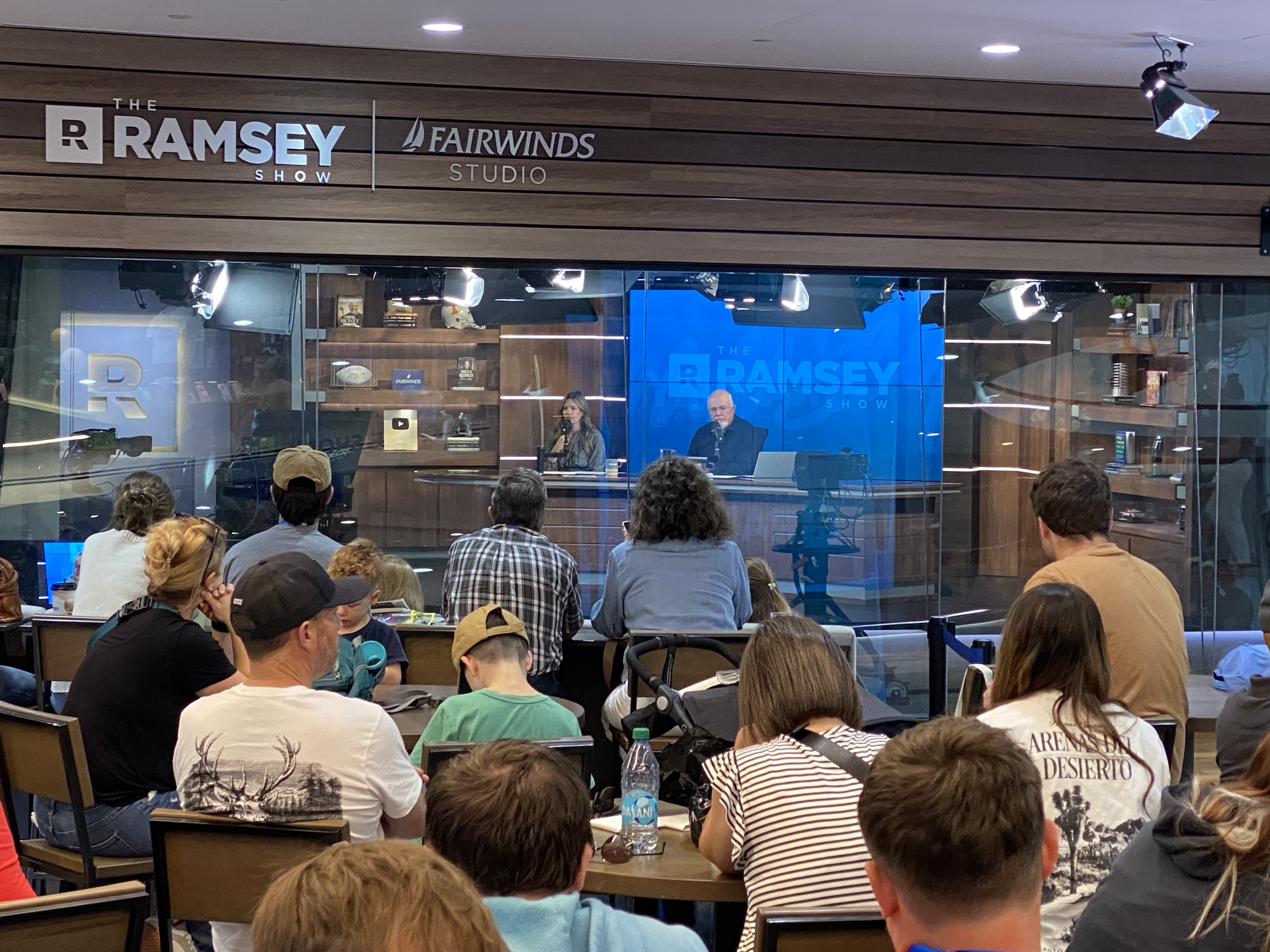
A live broadcast of The Ramsey Show, featuring Dave Ramsey (right) and Rachel Cruze (left), with an audience watching in the lobby of Ramsey Solutions.

=== Dave Ramsey ===
Personal finance author, speaker, and founder of Ramsey Solutions. Ramsey has hosted the program since its inception and is the author of several bestselling books, including The Total Money Makeover.

=== Rachel Cruze ===
Personal finance speaker and author. Cruze is Ramsey’s daughter and joined Ramsey Solutions in 2010. She began co-hosting The Ramsey Show in 2020 and also co-hosts the Smart Money Happy Hour podcast. She is the author of several bestselling books, such as Smart Money Smart Kids.

=== Dr. John Delony ===
Mental health and wellness expert. Delony joined Ramsey Solutions in 2020 and began co-hosting the show the same year. He holds two PhDs and is the author of Own Your Past Change Your Future and Building a Non-Anxious Life. He is also the host of The Dr. John Delony Show podcast.

=== George Kamel ===
Personal finance expert, author, and content creator. Kamel joined Ramsey Solutions in 2013 and became a co-host in 2021. He also co-hosts Smart Money Happy Hour and has an eponymous YouTube channel. Kamel is the author of Breaking Free from Broke.

=== Jade Warshaw ===
Personal finance coach, author, and former entertainment industry professional. Warshaw joined the show in 2022 and is the author of What No One Tells You About Money.

== Awards ==
- National Association of Broadcasters (NAB) Marconi Award (2009)
- Inducted into the NAB Broadcasting Hall of Fame (2013)
- Inducted into the National Radio Hall of Fame (2015)
