= List of California Vulcans in the NFL draft =

This is a list of California Vulcans players in the NFL draft.

== Key ==
B	Back	K	Kicker	NT	Nose tackle
C	Center	LB	Linebacker	FB	Fullback
DB	Defensive back	P	Punter	HB	Halfback
DE	Defensive end	QB	Quarterback	WR	Wide receiver
DT	Defensive tackle	RB	Running back	G	Guard
E	End	T	Offensive tackle	TE	Tight end

== Selections ==
Year	Round	Pick	Overall	Player	Team	Position
1953	10	10	119	Elmo Natali	Cleveland Browns	B
2011	7	48	251	Tommie Campbell	Tennessee Titans	DB
2013	6	2	170	Eric Kush	Kansas City Chiefs	C
