= Bob McDonough =

American football player (born 1963)

No. 21
- Position: Defensive back

Personal information
- Born: March 7, 1963 (age 63); Pittsburgh, Pennsylvania, U.S.
- Listed height: 6 ft 1 in (1.85 m)
- Listed weight: 170 lb (77 kg)

Career information
- High school: Perry Traditional Academy (Pittsburgh)
- College: California (PA)
- NFL draft: 1987: undrafted

Career history
- Pittsburgh Steelers (1987)*; Detroit Lions (1987)
- * Offseason or practice squad member only

Career NFL statistics
- Games played: 3
- Stats at Pro Football Reference

Robert E. McDonough (born March 7, 1963) is an American former professional football player who was a defensive back for the Detroit Lions of the National Football League (NFL). He played college football for the California Vulcans.

A native of Pittsburgh, McDonough attended Perry Traditional Academy High School but did not play football. He then attended Pennsylvania Western University, California, and after a successful tryout for the football team, was a starter all four years. He tried out with the NFL's Pittsburgh Steelers after not being selected in the 1987 NFL draft, but was not signed. During the 1987 NFL strike, he was signed by the Detroit Lions, for whom he played nickelback and on special teams, later being released after the three-game strike ended. He then played in a Pittsburgh-area minor league; the Pittsburgh Post-Gazette noted that within a month he went from covering all-time great Steve Largent to "receivers in the Greater Pittsburgh Football League, receivers whose names will never be the stuff of which the NFL marquees are made."
