= Elmo Natali =

American football player and coach (1927–2019)

Biographical details
- Born: January 27, 1927; Allegheny County, Pennsylvania, U.S.
- Died: May 28, 2019 (aged 92); Virginia Beach, Virginia, U.S.

Playing career
- 1947: Virginia Tech
- 1950–1952: California (PA)
- Position: Running back

Coaching career (HC unless noted)
- 1962–1965: California (PA) (assistant)
- 1967–1972: California (PA) (assistant)
- 1973–1976: California (PA)

Head coaching record
- Overall: 6–28

Elmo N. Natali (January 27, 1927 – May 28, 2019) was an American football player and coach. He served as the head football coach at California University of Pennsylvania from 1973 to 1976, compiling a record of 6–28. Natali was selected in the tenth round by the Cleveland Browns in the 1953 NFL draft. The Elmo Natali Student Center at Cal University bears his name. Natali died in Virginia Beach, Virginia on May 28, 2019, at the age of 92.

== Head coaching record ==
Year	Team	Overall	Conference	Standing	Bowl/playoffs
California Vulcans (Pennsylvania State Athletic Conference) (1973–1976)
1973	California	3–6	1–4	T–5th (West)	
1974	California	1–7	1–5	6th (West)	
1975	California	0–8	0–6	7th (West)	
1976	California	2–7	1–5	6th (West)	
California:		6–28	3–20		
Total:		6–28			
