= Andy McKenzie (American football) =

American football coach (born c. 1973)

Current position
- Title: Head coach
- Team: Assumption
- Conference: NE-10
- Record: 45–28

Biographical details
- Born: c. 1973 (age 52–53)
- Education: Allegheny College (1996); PennWest California (2006)

Playing career
- 1991–1994: Allegheny
- Position: Wide receiver

Coaching career (HC unless noted)
- 1995: Allegheny (WR)
- 1996: Northeastern (S)
- 1997–1998: Northeastern (WR)
- 1999: Northeastern (S)
- 2000–2001: Williams (QB)
- 2002–2007: Allegheny (OC/QB)
- 2008–2010: Holy Cross (QB)
- 2011–2015: Holy Cross (OC/QB)
- 2018–present: Assumption

Administrative career (AD unless noted)
- 2016–2017: Gardner HS (MA)

Head coaching record
- Overall: 45–28
- Tournaments: 1–2 (NCAA D-II playoffs)

Accomplishments and honors

Championships
- 1 NE-10 (2022)

Awards
- 2× First Team All-NCAC (1993–1994); 2× NE-10 Coach of the Year (2022, 2025)

Andrew McKenzie (born c. 1973) is an American college football coach. He is the head football coach for Assumption University, a position he has held since 2018. He previously coached for Allegheny, Northeastern, Williams, and Holy Cross. He played college football for Allegheny as a wide receiver.

== Head coaching record ==
Year	Team	Overall	Conference	Standing	Bowl/playoffs
Assumption Greyhounds (Northeast-10 Conference) (2018–present)
2018	Assumption	6–4	6–3	T–3rd	
2019	Assumption	6–4	5–3	T–3rd	
2020–21	No team—COVID-19				
2021	Assumption	5–5	5–3	4th	
2022	Assumption	8–3	6–1	T–1st	L NCAA Division II First Round
2023	Assumption	5–5	3–4	T–4th	
2024	Assumption	6–4	5–3	T–3rd	
2025	Assumption	9–3	6–1	2nd	L NCAA Division II Second Round
Assumption:		45–28	36–18		
Total:		45–28			
National championship Conference title Conference division title or championship game berth
