= Tom Rutledge =

American businessman

- Education: PennWest California (BA)
- Occupations: Executive Chairman, Charter Communications

Thomas M. Rutledge is an American communications executive who is executive chairman of Charter Communications, having previously been chairman and CEO before retiring as CEO in December 2022. He was president of the company from 2012 to 2016.

In 2016, Rutledge was the highest paid CEO in the United States, with his compensation from Charter for that year totaling $98.5 million, more than twice as much as the next highest and representing a significant increase over his 2015 earnings of $16.4 million. In the following years, his compensation as chairman and CEO of Charter varied widely, with Rutledge earning $8.15 million in 2018 and $8.74 million in 2019. In 2020, his total compensation from Charter rose to $38.8 million, increasing to $41.9 million in 2021.

Before joining Charter, Rutledge was COO of Cablevision from 2004 until 2011. He previously was president of Time Warner Cable. Rutledge is chairman of the National Cable and Telecommunications Association (NCTA), and is on the boards of CableLabs and C-SPAN.

In 2011, he received NCTA's Vanguard Award for Distinguished Leadership, the cable industry's highest honor. He is also a member of the Cable Hall of Fame, and was inducted into the Broadcasting and Cable Hall of Fame in 2011.

He attended PennWest California, where he graduated with a B.A. in economics in 1977.
