= Athlete Ally =

American LGBTQ athletic advocacy group

- Founded: January 2011
- Founder: Hudson Taylor
- Type: 501(c)3 Nonprofit
- Location: New York, New York
- Revenue: $990,621 (2015)
- Expenses: $819,337 (2015)
- Website: athleteally.org

Athlete Ally is a nonprofit LGBTQ athletic advocacy group based in the United States. The group aims to make athletic communities more inclusive and less discriminatory and help athletes to advocate for LGBTQ equality.

== History ==
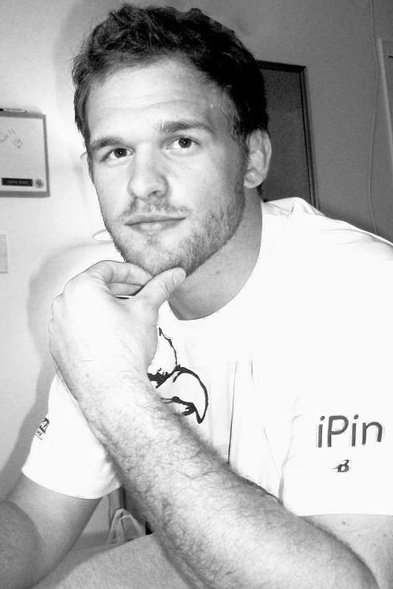
Athlete Ally founder Hudson Taylor

As an athlete in high school and college, Hudson Taylor often observed the use of homophobic language and demeaning humor, especially in sports. Soon after enrolling at the University of Maryland, he befriended LGBT students in his theatre classes and became increasingly aware of the pain caused by homophobic behavior. Hudson, who is not gay, felt it was imperative that he confront the marginalization of LGBT athletes, coaches and others through systemic homophobia and transphobia. He decided to take action as a straight ally to change athletic culture for the better. To stand in solidarity with the LGBT community, Hudson wore an LGBT equality sticker from the Human Rights Campaign on his wrestling headgear in college. Though he encountered criticism from his peers, he received positive attention from the media, and received thousands of emails from parents and closeted athletes, expressing thanks and sharing their own experiences of homophobia in sports. This inspired Hudson to launch Athlete Ally. When he blogged about experiencing homophobia in collegiate sports, he received hundreds of emails from closeted athletes. In 2013, Taylor received an Emery Award for his work with Athlete Ally.

== Education ==
Athlete Ally educates athletic communities at all levels—sport governing bodies, teams, and individual athletes—to understand obstacles to inclusion for LGBTQ people in sports and how they can build inclusive communities on their teams or within their organizations. We hold trainings across the country on college campuses, with front office staff of major sports leagues and institutions like the NBA, NCAA and the MLB and with individual athletes. We have partnered with teams in major cities like Seattle, New York, and Washington DC, to host Pride Nights and raise awareness about LGBTQ issues.

Athlete Ally visits K-8, high schools, colleges, and corporate campuses to educate and empower athletes and to educate others on the value of allyship. Athlete Ally has a network of speakers ranging from its executive director and three-times All-American Wrestler Hudson Taylor to professional athlete ambassadors.

In the past Athlete Ally has conducted all student-athlete Keynote speeches; facilitated conversations on policies and practice with athletic department representatives; held roundtable discussions with SAAC representatives on the LGBTQ-inclusiveness of their athletic departments; held joint meetings with the LGBTQ Center on campus to discuss partnerships and more. Every campus speaking engagement is customized with a campus based on the needs and interests related to LGBTQ inclusion.

Athlete Ally campus chapters decide on and enact programming specific to their campus based on Athlete Ally's mission. This includes hosting pride nights, giving educational workshops on LGBTQ-topics, working to adopt inclusive policies at the school and/or conference level, and advocating for anti-discriminatory policies at a city, state, regional and national level. Athlete Ally works with chapters daily to assess their campus culture to figure out appropriate programming. Athlete Ally currently has 35+ campus chapters.

Athlete Ally has a strong relationship with the National Basketball Association. The organization has conducted trainings at the NBA's Rookie Orientation Program, as well as at Junior NBA Coaches Forums.

== Sport policy ==
Athlete Ally works to ensure athletic communities are as LGBTQ inclusive as they should be. The organization works closely with teams and institutions like the NCAA to develop clear and accessible policies around LGBTQ inclusion. In 2012, Athlete Ally co-authored with Dr Pat Griffin the NCAA's first LGBTQ equality guide—Champions of Respect—for college coaches, athletes, and administrators. In 2017, Athlete Ally launched the Athletic Equality Index (AEI) to measure LGBTQ inclusion policies and practices in the NCAA's Power Five conferences. The AEI brings the LGBTQ movement into a new era of advocacy, transparency and accountability. Institutions will no longer be able to cite a lack of data and reporting as a rationale for inaction, and will offer an industry-wide benchmark for the progress needed to achieve the full dignity and inclusion of the LGBTQ community in sport.

Athlete Ally also applies pressure to global sport governing bodies to ensure their policies around LGBTQ inclusion are existent and consistent. In 2017, the organization launched an ongoing campaign demanding that World Rugby adopt transgender-inclusive policies.

In 2015, Athlete Ally joined the #WomenInFIFA movement to push FIFA Congress to enact proposed reforms for women in soccer.

Athlete Ally created the landmark campaign, Principle 6, which successfully lobbied the International Olympic Committee to include sexual orientation in the Olympic Charter.

Athlete Ally successfully launched a global campaign calling on FIBA to overturn its discriminatory ban on players competing in hijabs.

== Athlete activism ==
Athlete Ally believes athlete activism should be expected and accepted. They incubate athlete activism through their Ambassador Program for athletes and sports institutions to advance LGBTQ civil rights, including mobilizing athletes and teams to voice their opposition to laws and policies that discriminate against LGBTQ people. Athlete Ally helped organize Boston sports teams to support the Mass Public Accommodations Bill and worked with the NBA, NCAA, and ACC to move games and championships out of North Carolina over the passing of law HB2. In addition, Athlete Ally partnered with transgender high school wrestler Mack Beggs to publish a PSA pushing back against the anti-trans bathroom bill introduced in Texas Special Session.

== Board of directors and advisory board ==
The Athlete Ally board is composed of some of the most respected and qualified individuals in sports, media, and LGBT advocacy. The board works to implement the mission and vision of Athlete Ally and develop its strategic plan. The board of directors includes Hudson Taylor, Mike Balaban, Sean Avery, Brian Ellner, Alison Grover, Laura Clise, Lia Parifax, Sam Marchiano, Frederick Raffetto, Frank Selvaggi, Robert Smith, Joe Solmonese, Mark Stephanz, Sandye Taylor, Andrew Ward, Deborah Block and Christine Quinn.

Athlete Ally also includes an advisory board of athletes, media, academics and other sports professionals that help drive the organization's programmatic work. The advisory board includes:

- Brendon Ayanbadejo, chairman of Athlete Ally Advisory Board, NFL player
- Kathleen Behrens, executive vice president, Social Responsibility & Player Programs, NBA
- LZ Granderson, journalist and commentator, CNN & ESPN
- Brett Haber, sportscaster, The Tennis Channel
- David Kopay, former National Football League Player, author of The David Kopay Story
- Mark Kriegel, commentator on NFL Network's morning show NFL AM, Author of Namath: A Biography; Pistol: The Life of Pete Maravich; and The Good Son: The Life of Boom Boom Mancini
- Beth A. Livingston, assistant professor of human resource studies, Cornell University
- Akil Patterson, director of programs, Greco-Roman wrestler, Terrapin Wrestling Club
- Nick Rogers, president, Minnesota United Football Club
- Robbie Rogers, professional soccer player
- Erin Sharoni, host, "Romering the World", Jim Rome on Showtime
- Rennae Stubbs, professional tennis player

== See also ==
- Gay–straight alliance
- Human Rights Campaign
- It Gets Better Project
