= WCAL =

Student-run college radio station serving PennWest California

- California, Pennsylvania; United States
- Frequency: 91.9 MHz

Programming
- Format: Freeform

Ownership
- Owner: Student Association, Inc.

History
- Former call signs: WVCS
- Call sign meaning: For California University of Pennsylvania, former name of PennWest California

Technical information
- Licensing authority: FCC
- Facility ID: 63559
- Class: A
- ERP: 3.3 kilowatts
- HAAT: 49 meters
- Transmitter coordinates: 40°2′58″N 79°54′11.7″W

Links
- Public license information: Public file; LMS
- Webcast: Listen Live
- Website: wcal.calu.edu

WCAL (91.9 FM) is a student-run college radio station serving PennWest California (formerly known as California University of Pennsylvania) and the surrounding area, including Washington, Fayette, Westmoreland, Greene, and Allegheny counties.It also streams online.

Broadcasting at 3.3 kilowatts, the station can be heard in a 30-40 mile radius of California, Pennsylvania.

WCAL is FCC licensed to, and owned by, The Student Association, Inc., and broadcasts 24 hours per day from the 1st floor Media Suite in the Natali Student Center on the PennWest California campus.

The station operates a freeform format, and airs a variety of student and staff programming each week. The station also broadcasts Vulcans football and men's and women's basketball games.

WCAL is open to all students, regardless of major. PennWest California faculty and staff are also offered opportunities to air original programming.

== History ==
The Vulcan Radio Club was formed in the mid-1960s, but it split within a couple of years between those interested in AM/FM broadcasting and amateur, or “ham,” radio operators.

In spring 1969, students attempted to set up an unlicensed station in Vulcan Lounge, according to the Cal Times.

The station – now called WMCL – moved first to McCloskey Hall, then to a student's basement, then to a house on Beazel Street where train whistles interrupted the programs.

Finally, in fall 1971, the radio station moved to the basement of the student center, and the Student Activities Association requested a 10-watt FM license from the Federal Communications Commission.

Permission was granted in 1972. An official station – the 10-watt WVCS (Voice of Cal State) – was finally on the air, operated by the Student Broadcast Club.

In 1992, the student center was expanded to twice its size and named for respected administrator Elmo Natali. The campus radio station, TV station and student newspaper moved to a new media center there.

In March 2005, WCAL management negotiated a deal with Minnesota Public Radio to acquire the WCAL call letters.

== See also ==
- List of college radio stations in the United States
