= PennWest California =

Public university in California, Pennsylvania, US

Coordinates: 40.06678°N 79.88482°W

Pennsylvania Western University – California
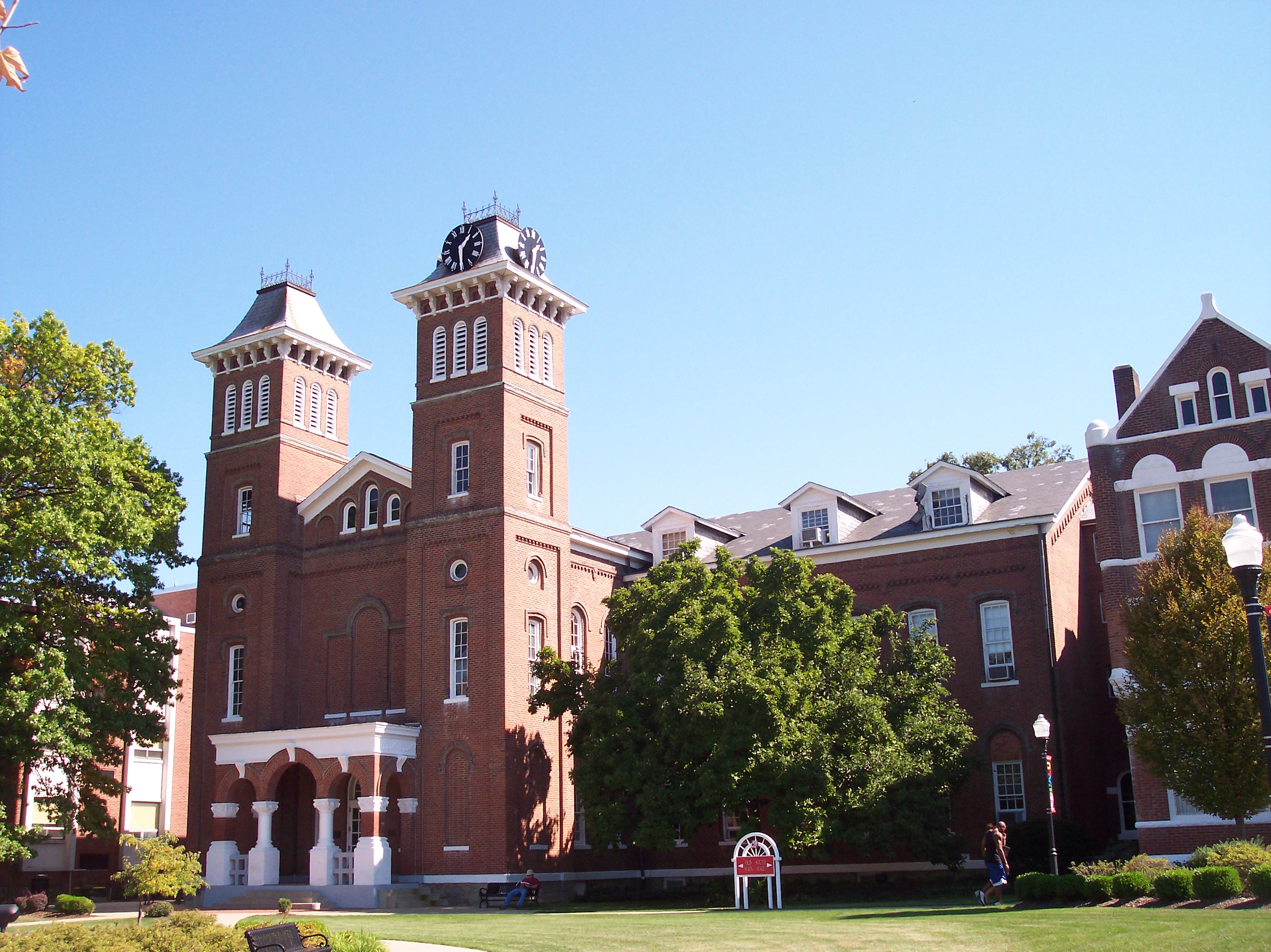
- Old Main at PennWest California
- Former name: List: Southwestern Normal School (1874–1914); California State Normal School (1914–1928); California State Teachers College (1928–1959); California State College (1959–1983); California University of Pennsylvania (1983–2022)
- Motto: Building Character. Building Careers.
- Type: Public university
- Established: 1852; 174 years ago
- Parent institution: Pennsylvania Western University PASSHE
- Academic affiliations: Space-grant
- Endowment: $44.8 million (2025)
- Chancellor: Christopher Fiorentino
- President: James Fisher (interim)
- Provost: Kristy Bishop
- Faculty: 296 full-time, 90 part-time
- Administrative staff: 463 full-time, 22 part-time
- Students: 2,493 (fall 2025)
- Location: California, Pennsylvania, United States
- Campus: Rural
- Colors: Red and black
- Nickname: Vulcans
- Sporting affiliations: NCAA Division II – PSAC
- Mascot: Blaze
- Website: pennwest.edu
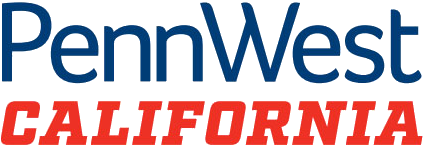

Pennsylvania Western University – California (PennWest California, formerly California University of Pennsylvania) is a campus of Pennsylvania Western University in California, Pennsylvania, United States. The campus had an enrollment of 2,717 as of fall 2024.

Founded in 1852 and merged into Pennsylvania Western University in 2021, the university offers bachelor's, master's, and doctoral degrees. It is accredited by the Middle States Commission on Higher Education. The school was California University of Pennsylvania from 1983 to 2022, before the merger.

== History ==
California University of Pennsylvania traces its roots back to 1852, when the community of California spent tax money and donations to create an academy for kindergarten through college-level courses. Its first principal was Ellis N. Johnson Jr. of Ohio. In 1864, it purchased 10 acres (4.0 ha) and moved to what is now the center of its present location, and a year later the school received a charter to be a normal school. In 1874, the institution was renamed Southwestern Normal School and in 1914 Pennsylvania bought the school, renaming it the California State Normal School and converted it into a two-year institute for training of elementary school teachers.

In 1928 the school restored a full four-year curriculum and was renamed the California State Teachers College. The programs offered were expanded over time and broadened beyond teacher training, and by 1959 the school's name was condensed to California State College. In 1962, the school added a graduate program. The school became a part of the State System of Higher Education on July 1, 1983. At the same time, it was granted university status under the name, California University of Pennsylvania.

In July 2021, the university was officially merged with fellow Western Pennsylvania institutions Clarion University of Pennsylvania and Edinboro University of Pennsylvania. On October 14, 2021, the state officially adopted the new and current name of the combined universities: Pennsylvania Western University.

== Academics ==
PennWest California has more than 150 undergraduate programs and numerous master's degree programs. As of 2020, it has three doctoral programs:

- Criminal Justice,
- Education and Administration Leadership, and
- Health Science and Exercise Leadership.

In addition, it has multiple certification, certificate, and licensure programs. Cal U has a Global Online program, which offers undergraduate and graduate degrees, as well as certificates.

== Campus ==
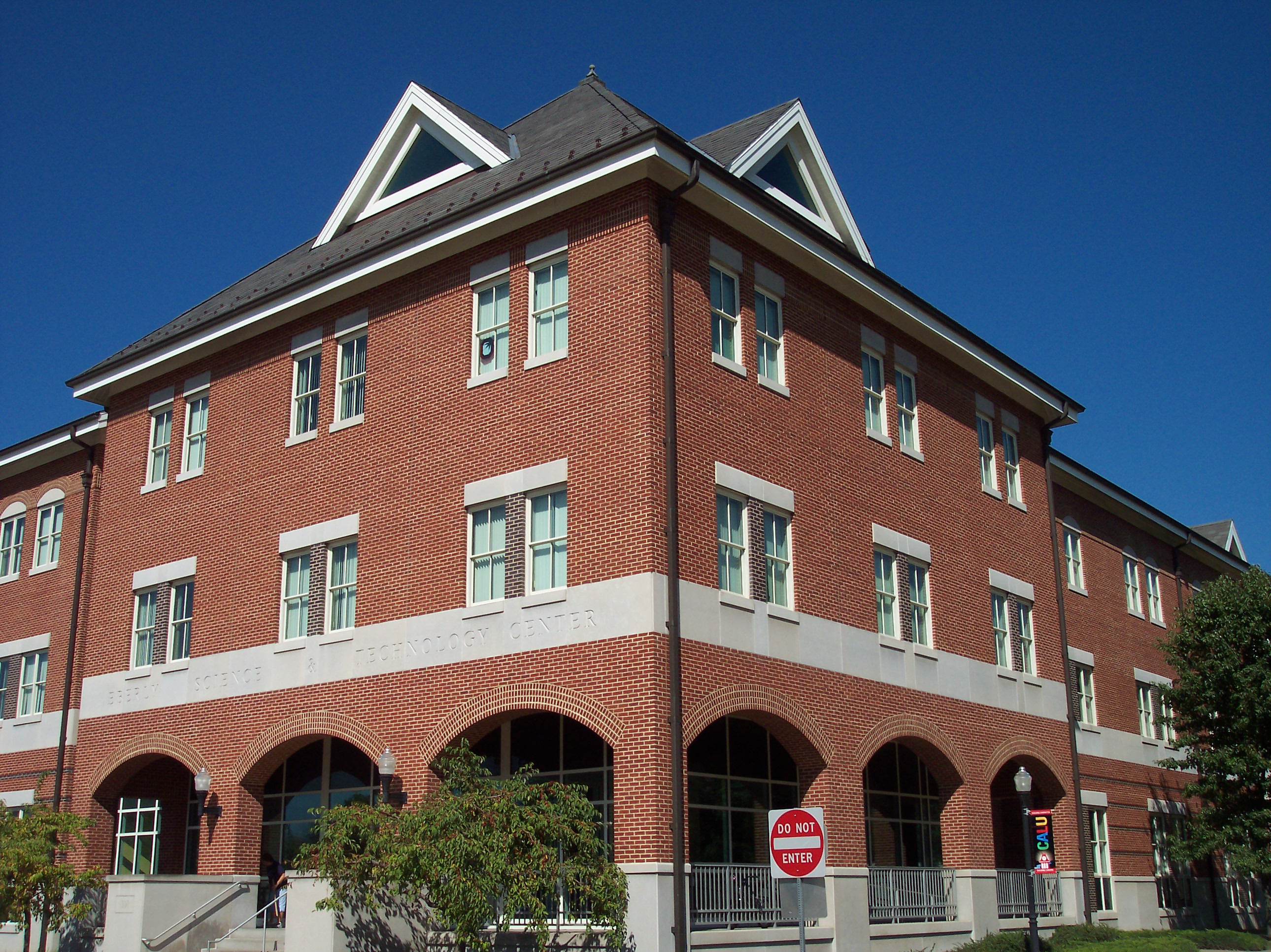
Eberly Science & Technology Center

The main campus consists of about 38 buildings situated on 92 acres (37 ha). Another 9-acre (3.6 ha) facility is located near the main campus and houses the school's soccer facility. An additional 98-acre (40 ha) recreation complex, George H. Roadman University Park, is located one mile (1.6 km) from campus and includes a football stadium, various sports facilities, and picnic facilities. The university's student association also owns 98 acres at the SAI Farm, located near Roadman Park, as well as 25-acre Vulcan Village Student Apartments. Cal U has a large virtual school.

California University has recently received state and private grants to rebuild the campus. Since 2000, six new residence halls have been completed, each with private bathrooms. A short drive or bus ride from campus, Cal U has apartment-like housing at the Vulcan Village complex.

The Elmo Natali Student Center, operated by the Student Association, Inc., is the main hub of student activities on campus. The student center hosts the student services offices, commuter center, theater, performance center, campus bookstore, the school's TV and Radio stations, CUTV and WCAL, as well as four distinctive dining areas. The Union was recently renovated as of the summer of 2015, planning to add new dining and study areas for Cal U students.

The Eberly Science and Technology Center opened in 1999, while the new Duda Hall (which replaced the original Duda World Cultures Building) opened in 2007. Steele Auditorium underwent a major renovation and expansion project, reopening in the Fall of 2007.

The Herron Hall recreation facility underwent significant renovation and expansion through the Fall and Spring semesters of 2008, opening to student and faculty use on Homecoming Day 2009. The new facility features an elevated running track, cardio equipment, free weight equipment, weight machines, two racquetball courts, a dance studio, two gymnasiums, and a swimming pool.

== Athletics ==
PennWest California's nickname is the Vulcans, and its athletic teams compete at the NCAA Division II in the Pennsylvania State Athletic Conference (PSAC). The school has been one of the more successful in the PSAC.

The university has won a total of five national championships. In 2004, sophomore guard Megan Storck knocked down a deep three-pointer in the final minute of play, breaking open a tie ballgame to give Cal U its first women's national basketball title. Women's basketball won a second title by defeating California Baptist 86–69 in 2015, helped by a 21–0 first half run. Cal U's softball program won back to back championships in 1997 and 1998, including a 50–1 campaign during its first championship run. In 2008, the men's club ice hockey team captured an ACHA Division III national championship over San Diego State in a 7–3 finale capping off a 30–1 season record.

The Vulcans have also had success in women's volleyball, men's and women's soccer, men's basketball, women's tennis and baseball, each advancing to the NCAA Tournament this decade. The men's basketball team has had a pair of runs to the NCAA Division II Final Four (1992 and 1996), as well as advancing to the Elite Eight in 2008. The women's basketball team has made two consecutive trips to the Elite Eight (2008 and 2009). The volleyball program went to the Final Four in 2000 and the Sweet 16 twice (2004 and 2006), as well as the Elite Eight twice (2007 and 2008). The women's tennis team advanced to the Division II Elite Eight in 2006. The men's soccer team won the first PSAC Championship in program history in 2008. The women's soccer team has advanced to its first ever NCAA tournament in 2009, going on to win the Atlantic Regional title.

The PennWest California football team has won five consecutive PSAC championships, beginning in 2005. The Vulcans also won in 2006, 2007, 2008, and 2009. The Vulcans football team ended the 2007 season ranked #4 in the NCAA Division II, won the PSAC Championship, and captured their first NCAA Regional title, Defeating Shepherd University by a score of 58–38. With that victory, Cal U advanced to the National Semifinal game, which was played at Hepner-Bailey Field at Adamson Stadium. The Vulcans lost in their first attempt to advance to a national championship, falling to Valdosta State (Georgia), 28–24. In 2008, the Vulcans again advanced won the Regional title, this time traveling to Bloomsburg and defeating the Huskies 27–24. Once again the Vulcans were rewarded with hosting rights for the National Semifinal. However, the Vulcans were defeated by Minnesota Duluth, thus ending their second try at a national title. The 2009 season saw the California Vulcans start with an 0–2 record. However, Cal U rebounded and qualified for the Division II Championships once again. California won their third consecutive Super Region 1 title, defeating West Liberty. However, the Vulcans had to go on the road for the first time for their next National Semifinal matchup. The Vulcans traveled to Maryville, Missouri to take on Division II power Northwest Missouri State. The Vulcans were defeated by the Bearcats by a score of 56–31. Prior to the start of the 2009 season, Cal U purchased a wave cam generally used on Monday Night Football and by purchasing this new technology Cal U was the only college team in the country to have one.

Vulcan athletes also demonstrate academic accomplishments. More than half of Cal U's 18 varsity athletic teams posted grade point averages above 3.00 during the 2006–07 academic year, and 74% of the nearly 400 student-athletes were named to the Athletic Director's Academic Honor Roll (3.00 GPA or better), including 36 with perfect 4.00 GPAs during at least one semester.

PennWest California also manages several athletic facilities. Hamer Hall is the home of PennWest California's indoor teams, including volleyball, basketball and swimming, as well as athletic training and weight-training facilities, locker rooms, athletic offices and classrooms. The football and track & field teams call Hepner-Bailey Field at Adamson Stadium, located a mile south of the main campus, home. The cross country, softball, soccer and tennis teams compete in the adjacent Roadman Park complex. CONSOL Energy Park in Washington, Pennsylvania, hosts Cal U's home baseball games annually. The golf teams, added to the lineup of varsity sports in 2005, play at the adjacent Cedarbrook Golf Course.

Bill Brown, who recently retired, was the head basketball coach for 20 years, with an overall record of 365–207. Jess Strom is the women's head basketball coach, with an overall record of 258-78, including a 2015 NCAA National Championship.

== Notable alumni ==
- Ody Abbott, professional baseball player
- Nicholas Addlery, professional soccer player
- Philip Alston, professional basketball player
- Matthew Antoine, skeleton racer
- Don Asmonga, professional baseball and basketball player
- Bob Bailor, former baseball player
- Donna Feigley Barbisch, U.S. Army major general
- Del Beshore, professional basketball player
- Mary Beth Buchanan, lawyer
- Gary Butler, professional football player
- Tommie Campbell, professional football player
- Jeff Casteel, college football coach
- Wes Cates, professional football player
- Allen Foster Cooper, politician
- Bruce Dal Canton, professional baseball player
- Julia Cohen, professional tennis player
- Dominique Curry, professional football player
- Peter Daley, politician
- Gary Dunn, football coach
- Travis Everhart, college football coach
- Judson Flint, professional football player
- Brendan Folmar, former professional football player
- Grant Furlong, politician
- Priscilla Giddings, politician
- Catherine R. Gira, educator and administrator
- C. J. Goodwin, professional football player
- Kirby Griffin, football player
- Dale Hamer, professional football referee
- Erik Harris, professional football player
- Chris Hogan, financial expert
- Ron Hughes, professional football player
- JaQuae Jackson, professional football player
- Kimmarie Johnson, model and actress
- LaRoi Johnson, former professional football player
- Rishaw Johnson, professional football player
- Terrence Johnson, professional football player
- Garrett Kelleher, professional soccer team owner
- Perry Kemp, professional football player
- Jeff Knox Jr., professional football player
- Rick Krivda, professional baseball player
- Tony Kunczewski, football coach
- Eric Kush, professional football player
- Lynne Latham, dancer, actress, and designer
- Alan R. Lynn, U.S. Army Lieutenant General
- Frank Mascara, politician
- Kevin McCabe, former professional football player
- Dewey McDonald, professional football player
- Bob McDonough, former professional football player
- Andy McKenzie, football coach
- Rontez Miles, professional football player
- Sean Murphy, football coach
- Elmo Natali, former professional football player and coach
- James Nixon, professional football player
- Terry O'Shea, professional football player
- Akil Patterson, football player and wrestler, LGBT advocate
- Dan Pifer, football coach
- Dave Pilipovich, basketball coach
- Mary Jo Podgurski, sex education advocate
- Josh Portis, professional football player
- Ruth Rowan, politician
- Thomas Rutledge, executive chairman of Charter Communications
- Shaka Smart, college basketball coach
- Bruce Foster Sterling, politician
- Megan Timpf, Olympic softball player
- Steven Toprani, lawyer
- Paul K. Van Riper, United States Marine Corps Lieutenant General
- Bill Viola, mixed martial artist
- Parke Wentling, politician
- R. Steven Whitcomb, retired United States Army lieutenant general
- Natalie Wideman, professional softball player
- Dennis E. Wisnosky, civil servant
- Mike Yurcich, football coach
- Jack Zduriencik, professional baseball manager

== See also ==
- Old Main
- Hepner-Bailey Field at Adamson Stadium
- WCAL-FM
