= Mary Jo Podgurski =

American adolescent health educator

Mary Jo Podgurski is an educator who works on adolescent sexual health and development, and childbirth education.

== Education ==
Podgurski earned her nursing degree from Westmoreland School of Nursing in 1970 and then worked at Memorial Sloan Kettering Cancer Center in New York. In 1974 she earned a bachelor's degree from California University of Pennsylvania, and in 1979 she earned a master's degree in counseling from Liberty University. In 2009, she earned her doctorate of education from the University of Phoenix. As of 2020 Podgurski is an adjunct professor at Washington & Jefferson College.

== Career ==
Podgurski began working with pregnant teens in 1976. She has worked on education efforts in AIDS education for children, conducted sex education classes where she is known for being open and frank with students, and she founded the Academy for Adolescent Health. She also writes for The Observer-Reporter newspaper, and has been featured on television programs such as "The Doctors" and "Scary Mommy". She is known for instigating difficult conversations with children, and for organizing a book club on banned books for teenagers. As of 2015 she has presented sex education programs to over 250,000 children, Podgurski served as president of Lamaze International.

Podgurski has also published a series of books, including her 'Nonnie' series of books which were patented in 2018. Her book Inside out : your body is amazing inside and out and belongs only to you has two editions, and has been published in Spanish.

== Selected publications ==
- Podgurski, Mary Jo (2014). Nonnie talks about gender. Alice Burroughs. Washington, PA. ISBN 978-1-5006-2146-9. OCLC 953101149.
- Podgurski, Mary Jo (2016). "Theorists and Techniques: Connecting Education Theories to Lamaze Teaching Techniques". The Journal of Perinatal Education. 25 (1): 9–17. doi:10.1891/1058-1243.25.1.9. ISSN 1058-1243. PMC 4719108. PMID 26848246.
- Podgurski, Mary Jo (2014). Inside out : your body is amazing inside and out and belongs only to you : an interactive coloring book for children and adults. Alice Burroughs. Washington, PA. ISBN 9781470113995. OCLC 1302075662.

== Awards and honors ==
In 2001 her work, Voices – The Reality of Early Childbearing – Transcending the Myths, received an honorable mention in the educational awards given by the National Council on Family Relations. The National Organization on Adolescent Pregnancy honored Podgurski with their annual award in 2004. In 2008 the Washington branch of the NAACP honored Podgurski with their Human Rights Award for her work in reducing teen pregnancies. In 2014 she received the Carol Mendez Cassell Award for Excellence in Sexuality Education from the Healthy Teen Network. In 2020 Washington County Community Foundation presented her with an award for an outstanding public educator. She received the Staunton Farms Albert J. Craig Award for Innovation in Behavioral Health In 2021, she was selected to receive the Washington Health System's Distinguished Service Award.
