= Dennis E. Wisnosky =

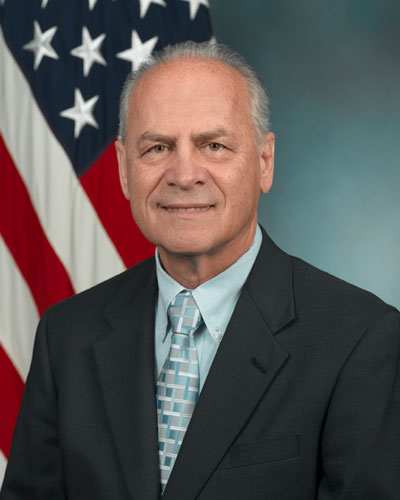
Dennis E. Wisnosky

Dennis E. Wisnosky (born 1943) is an American consultant, writer and former chief architect and chief technical officer of the US DoD Business Mission Area (BMA) within the Office of Business Transformation. He is known as one of the creators and initiators of the Integrated Definition (IDEFs) language, a standard for modeling and analysis in management and business improvement efforts.

== Biography ==
Dennis E. Wisnosky was born in Washington, Pennsylvania. and received his bachelor's degree in physics and mathematics from California University of Pennsylvania, a master's in management science from the University of Dayton, and a master's in electrical engineering from the University of Pittsburgh.

Wisnosky joined the US Air Force Materials Laboratory, Wright-Patterson Air Force Base, in Ohio in 1971, where he headed the computer and information services. In 1976 he became manager of its ICAM program. In 1986 he founded Wizdom Systems and became its chief executive officer. In August 2006 he was appointed chief technical officer (CTO) of the Department of Defense (DoD) Business Mission Area within the office of the Deputy Under Secretary of Defense for Business Transformation (OUSD (BT)).

As of 2013 he left DoD to lead the standards implementation process for FIBO, the financial industry business ontology that is a joint effort of The Enterprise Data Management Council in conjunction with the Object Management Group.

He has received numerous honors for his work, including in May 1997, Fortune magazine recognized Wisnosky as "one of the five heroes of manufacturing", the Federal 100 Award in 2007, the Award for Excellence in Government Leadership in 2012 and more.

== Work ==
Wisnosky has made contributions in the fields of information technology (IT) consulting and training, including business process reengineering and enterprise architecture. His specialty has been deriving solutions to effectively move organizations from their "As-Is" state of inefficiency to their "To-Be" state of achieving strategic and tactical objectives.

=== Integrated computer-aided manufacturing ===
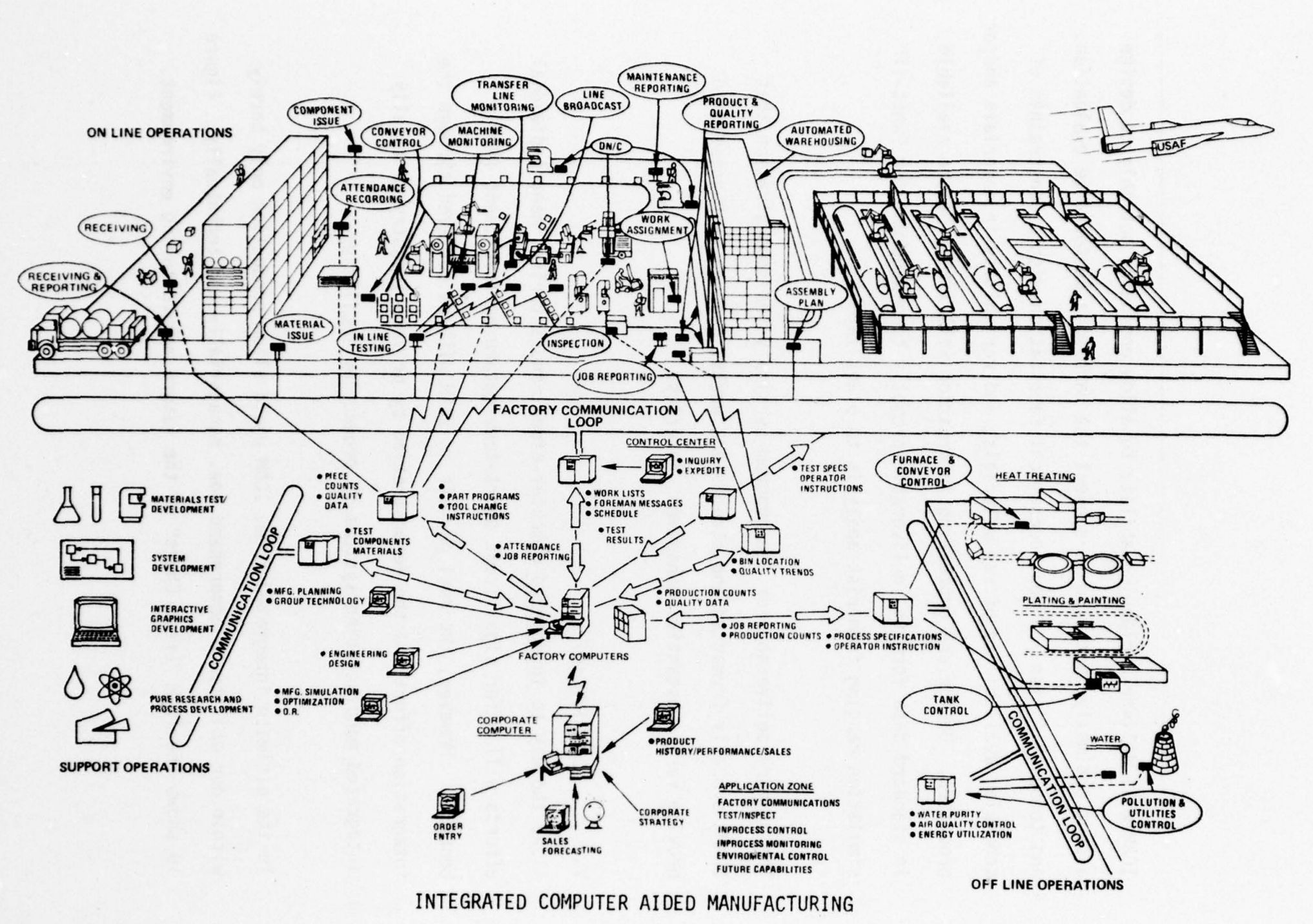
Online operations and support operations in an Integrated Computer Aided Manufacturing environment, 1977

Dennis E. Wisnosky and Dan L. Shunk are recognized as co-founders of the ICAM program, which they founded in 1976. This program started as U.S. Air Force funded program for Integrated Computer-Aided Manufacturing, and was brought about by the "needs and pressures in state-of-the-art technologies, economics, increasing human limitations, aerospace design and manufacturing complexity, computer developments, and competition from abroad."

In the 1980s Joseph Harrington focusses CIM on the manufacturing company as a whole. Harrington considered manufacturing a "monolithic function". This book discussed how the functions could interact as a seamless whole. Harrington was helpful to Wisnosky and Shunk in designing the USAF's ICAM program in the mid-1970s, and their work, in turn, influenced Harrington's second book".

=== Group vice president, entrepreneur and CEO ===
Beginning in 1980, until asked to join the DoD, Wisnosky was a director and then an officer in public companies, and then founded and successfully exited, a series of his own companies – the Wizdom companies. These organizations specialized in delivering the products and services to manufacturing industries in the areas of robotics, factory control systems and business process reengineering.

=== Chief technical officer ===
As chief technical officer, Wisnosky was responsible for providing expert guidance and oversight in the design, development, and modification of the federated architectures supporting the Department's Business Mission Area. This role incorporates oversight of the DoD Business Enterprise Architecture (BEA) – the corporate level systems, processes, and data standards that are common across the DoD, in addition to the business architectures of the services and defense agencies.

As chief architect, Wisnosky ensured that the federated architectures of the BMA fully support the department's vision, mission, strategy and priorities for business transformation, and that each tier of the overall architecture is clearly defined with appropriate focused accountability aligned to the management structure of the DoD. He verifies that the BEA and component architectures remain consistent and compliant with the federal enterprise architecture (FEA), and will support and collaborate with the DoD components to unify architecture planning, development, and maintenance through a federated approach. Wisnosky also serves as an advisor on the development of requirements and extension of DoD net-centric enterprise services in collaboration with the office of the DoD chief information officer. He was the first to introduce service-oriented architecture (SOA) and to the business mission area (BMA) and has established and led an enterprise approach to delivering BI based upon semantic technologies.

=== Books ===
Wisnosky has published books and papers in the fields of BPR, semiconductor processing, information technology, robotics and factory controls, management, SOA and semantic technology. He is the originator of the funnel visualization of enterprise control networks. He authored or co-authored 7 books. His book, "Overcoming Funnel Vision", published in 1996, won critical acclaim. His book, "DoDAF Wizdom", written in 2004, remains the definitive how to guide for successfully building enterprise architectures using the DoD Architecture Framework (DoDAF).

=== Speaker ===
Regarded to be a technology visionary and an entrepreneur who can engineer and deliver products, he is a frequent speaker on service-oriented architecture (SOA) and semantic technologies. As a private citizen, he has testified before subcommittees of both the U.S. House and Senate on U.S. productivity issues and the quality of American work life.

== Publications ==
Wisnosky has published over 100 papers, and Wisnosky has authored or co-authored 7 books, in the fields of management, computer science, Services Oriented Architecture (SOA), Enterprise Architecture, Knowledge Management, computer-aided design/computer-aided manufacturing (CAD/CAM), electronics, computer-integrated manufacturing (CIM) and the Semantic Technologies/Web. Books:

- 1977. An overview of the Air Force program for integrated computer aided manufacturing (ICAM) . ICAM program prospectus. SME technical paper
- 1980. The Southfield Report on Computer Integrated Manufacturing: Productivity for the 1980s : Proceedings of a Joint DoD—industry Manufacturing Technology Workshop. With Joseph Harrington, Manufacturing Technology Advisory Group, CAD/CAM Subcommittee, Dept. of Defense, United States.
- 1981. Computer Integrated Manufacturing the Air Force ICAM Approach. Society of Manufacturing Engineers.
- 1996. Softlogic: Overcoming Funnel Vision: How and Why IEC 1131 Based Softlogic Frees the Enterprise to Become Agile and Profitable. With Michael Babb.
- 2000. Beyond the Supply Chain: A Step-by-Step Guide to Radically Improving Healthcare Delivery with Electronic Transactions. With Leon E. Salomon and Anne Jones. Wizdom Systems, Inc., 2000. ISBN 1-893990-07-9
- 2001. BPR wizdom : a practical guide to BPR project management. With Rita C. Feeney. Wizdom Systems, 2001. ISBN 1-893990-08-7
- 2004. Dodaf Wizdom: a Practical Guide to Planning, Managing and Executing Projects to Build Enterprise Architectures using the Department of Defense Architecture Framework. With Joseph Vogel. Wizdom Systems, Inc., 2004. ISBN 1-893990-09-5.

Articles, a selection:

- 1969. "Triangular Sawtooth Sweep for NMR with Provision for Manual Operation or Time Averaging". Review of Scientific Instruments. Volume: 40, Issue: 3 Digital Object Identifier: 10.1063/1.1683981
- 2008. "DoD Business Mission Area Service-Oriented Architecture to Support Business Transformation. Wisnosky, D., Feldshteyn, D., Mancuso, W., Gough, A., Riutort, E., & Strassman, P. in: The Journal of Defense Software October 2008.
- 2009. "Principles and Patterns at the U.S. Department of Defense". Wisnosky, D. In: SOA Magazine, (Issue XXV). (January 19, 2009).
- 2010. "Primitives and the Future of SOA: DoD looks to develop a common vocabulary to improve system design". Yasin, R. (February 1, 2010). Government Computer News, Vol 29 (Issue 2), pp. 25–27.
- 2011. "Engineering Enterprise Architecture: Call to Action" .Wisnosky, D. (January 2011). Common Defense Quarterly, (Issue 9), pp. 9–14.
