= Ramsey Solutions =

American self-improvement company

The Lampo Group, LLC

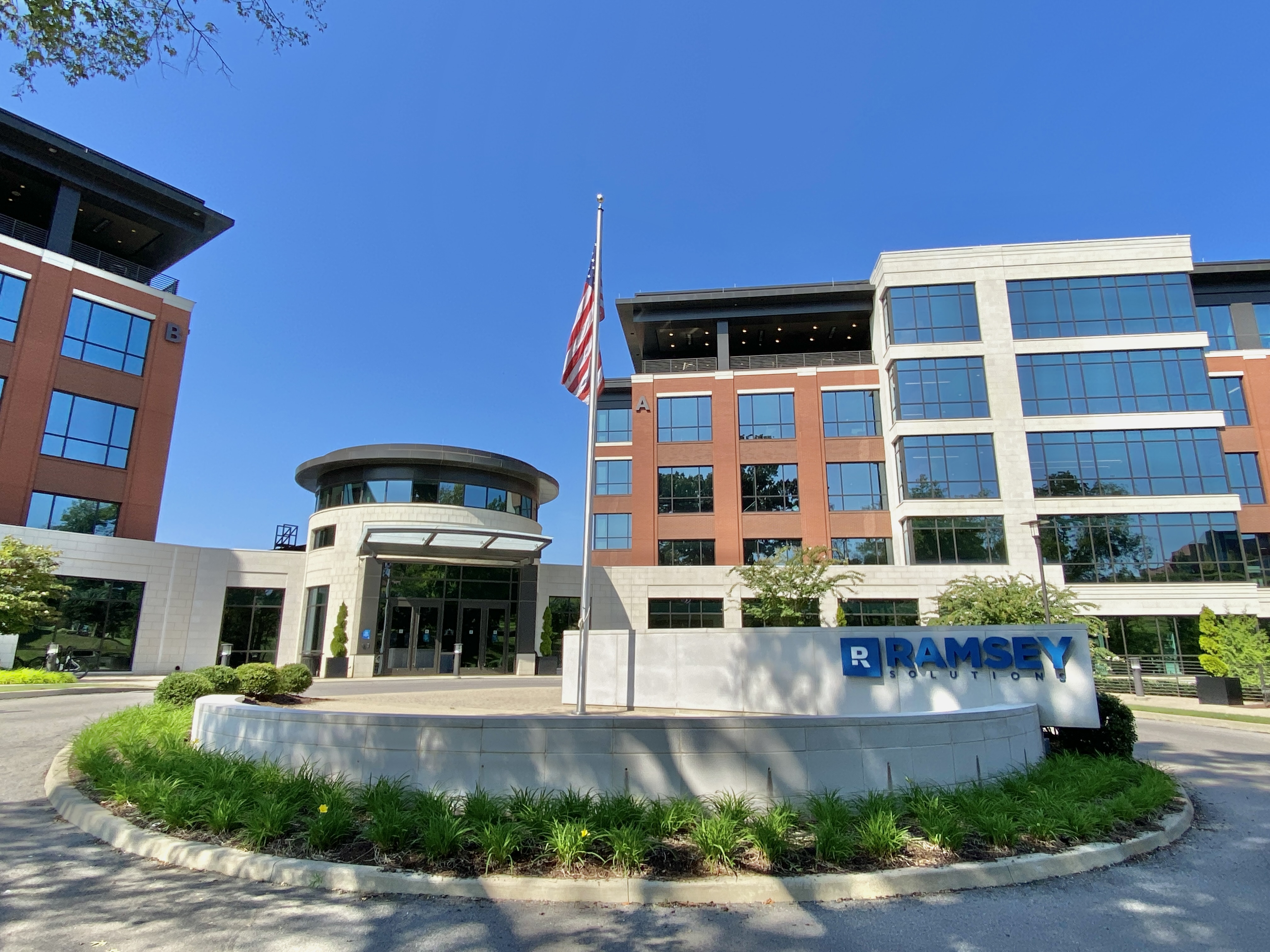
- Ramsey Solutions headquarters in Franklin, Tennessee, 2024.
- Trade name: Ramsey Solutions
- Type: Private
- Industry: Personal finance education; Publishing; Broadcasting/podcasting; Self-improvement; Leadership development; Professional development
- Founded: 1991; 35 years ago
- Founder: Dave Ramsey; Sharon Ramsey
- Headquarters: 1011 Reams Fleming Boulevard, Franklin, Tennessee, U.S.
- Number of locations: 1
- Key people: Dave Ramsey (CEO); Daniel Ramsey (president)
- Products: Financial Peace University; EveryDollar; The Ramsey Show; Podcasts and YouTube shows; Books; Live events
- Services: Financial coaching; Leadership coaching; Professional referral services
- Owner: Ramsey family
- Website: www.ramseysolutions.com

The Lampo Group, LLC, doing business as Ramsey Solutions, is an American company that provides products and services relating to personal finance, leadership development, interpersonal relationships, and professional development. Founded in 1991 by Dave Ramsey and his wife, Sharon, the company is based in Franklin, Tennessee.

== History ==
While recovering from his 1988 bankruptcy and rebuilding his real estate business, Dave Ramsey began offering one-on-one financial counseling sessions at his church. In 1991, as demand for his services grew, Ramsey formed The Lampo Group. The name “Lampo” is derived from a Greek word meaning “to shine,” referencing Matthew 5:14.

The company's first product was Financial Peace, a self-published book released in 1992 that outlined Ramsey's personal finance principles. Viking Press published a revised edition in 1997, marking the company's first New York Times bestseller.

The same year, Ramsey was a guest on a local radio show on WTN in Nashville, answering money-related questions from listeners and promoting his book. After the host quit over financial issues, Ramsey and two other money experts were invited to host a new show in the same time slot called The Money Game. By 1996, Ramsey became the show's sole host and began national syndication independently through Lampo. In 1999, the show was renamed The Dave Ramsey Show.

Lampo expanded its offerings throughout the 1990s and 2000s. The company launched Financial Peace University (FPU) in 1994—a structured in-person personal finance course originally called “Life After Debt.” In 1996, Lampo established its first website and began distributing FPU on VHS a year later. FPU went to DVD in the 2000s and finally became digital.

In 2000, Lampo developed a child-centered version of FPU called Financial Peace Jr. The company also created financial literacy curricula for schools, beginning with Financial Peace for the Next Generation, now known as Foundations in Personal Finance.

In 2002, Lampo moved from Nashville to the Cool Springs commercial center between Brentwood and Franklin, Tennessee. The grouping of offices and buildings Lampo occupied became known as “Financial Peace Plaza,” which included visitor areas, a coffee shop, and a studio for live broadcasts.

In 2005, Dave Ramsey began teaching a leadership development curriculum called EntreLeadership, originally created to train leaders within his own company. After observing its effectiveness, he adapted the content into a weeklong workshop for external business leaders. The program eventually expanded to include a book, a podcast, and live events.

From 2007 to 2010, The Dave Ramsey Show was adapted for television on Fox Business. The show was broadcast from the studio in the Lampo offices.

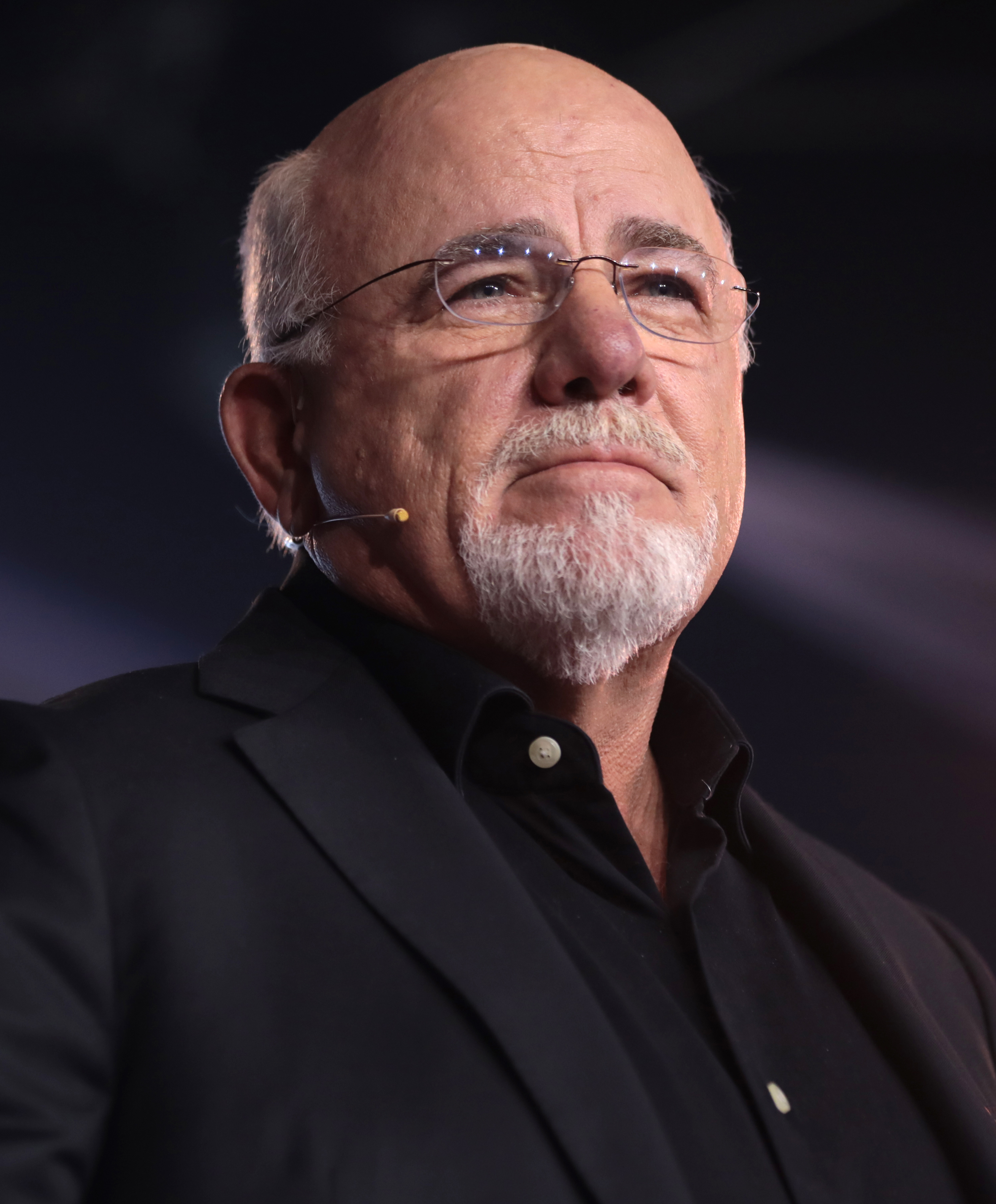
Dave Ramsey, 2023.

In 2008, Dave Ramsey initiated a long-term succession plan aimed at reducing his direct leadership responsibilities over time. He described the process as "incrementally letting go" of CEO duties while continuing as on-air talent and owner. As part of the transition, he established the Ramsey Personalities program in 2012 to delegate teaching and public speaking roles to other communicators. The same year, an operating board was formed to assist with strategic decisions, and he and his children were named board members.

The Lampo Group was publicly rebranded as Ramsey Solutions in 2014—though the company is still legally named The Lampo Group, LLC. Also in 2014, The Daily Beast reported that Dave Ramsey had personally lashed out against former Ramsey Solutions employees he claimed were discussing working conditions at the company on Facebook and Twitter. At company staff meetings, Ramsey recounted conversations from a private Facebook group of former employees that he had infiltrated, offered cash rewards for the identities of some members who took to anonymous Twitter accounts once they realized Ramsey had joined the private group, and "pulled a gun out of a bag to try to teach a lesson about gossip."

In July 2019, Ramsey Solutions relocated to a larger corporate campus in Franklin, Tennessee, which included an office building, production studios, an employee cafeteria, and a visitor lobby with a café, museum displays, and a gift shop. In 2021, the second office building was opened, and a 2,500-seat auditorium for weekly staff meetings and live events was finished in 2023. All the land purchases and building construction were paid for with cash, and a tax incentive program was established between Ramsey Solutions, Williamson County, and the city of Franklin to ease the cost.

In 2020, The Dave Ramsey Show was renamed The Ramsey Show to reflect the growing role of the Ramsey Personalities and the company's shift toward long-term continuity beyond its founder. According to Dave Ramsey, the rebranding "sets the show up for generational success; that it doesn’t die when I do." Ramsey also says that he will continue to co-host The Ramsey Show "as long as I make sense."

That July, Caitlin O'Connor, a former Ramsey Solutions employee, filed a federal lawsuit against the company alleging that she was fired for being pregnant and, since she wasn't married to the baby's father, for violating Ramsey Solutions' employee conduct policies.

During the COVID-19 pandemic in December 2020, a complaint was filed with the Williamson County Health Department alleging that caterers hired for the Ramsey Solutions Christmas party at its company headquarters were instructed not to wear masks or gloves while serving, which the company said was "absolutely not true. There was no prohibition on that." Ramsey Solutions responded further that there was no truth to the complaint and a worker indicated that many workers in fact chose to wear masks and/or gloves. Earlier in the pandemic, the company remained open after employees tested positive for the virus, ignored recommendations to avoid large gatherings, and hosted a July business conference at the company headquarters after the Marriott hotel originally booked for the event canceled citing safety concerns.

On March 10, 2021, Ramsey Personality Chris Hogan left the company, citing "things going on in my personal life . . . that are not in line with Ramsey Solutions." Hogan's resignation followed accusations of having several extramarital affairs, including one with a co-worker at Ramsey Solutions.

In May 2021, Religion News Service (RNS) obtained recordings of Dave Ramsey mocking employees over the policy and explaining Chris Hogan's 2019 absence as a "rest break" following the affair accusations. Melissa Hogan, Chris Hogan's ex-wife, issued a statement to RNS claiming that the company downplayed Chris's behavior, covered for him, and characterized her behavior as "anger, hyperbole, and drama."

According to a September 2021 lawsuit, when Julie Anne Stamps, a Ramsey Solutions employee on the customer care team, approached her supervisor regarding coming out as a lesbian in May 2020, the supervisor allegedly explained that company policy would not allow Stamps to continue to be employed at Ramsey Solutions. Stamps alleged that her departure from the company was further expedited once the United States Supreme Court June 15, 2020, ruling in Bostock v. Clayton County was decided. Ramsey Solutions denied the accusations and the matter was settled without the need for a trial.

In October 2021, Ramsey Solutions released Borrowed Future, a full-length documentary examining the student loan industry and its impact on borrowers. The film features stories of individuals dealing with significant education debt and promotes debt-free alternatives for pursuing higher education.

In a December 2021 federal lawsuit, a former employee alleged that Ramsey Solutions violated his religious rights by firing him when he took scientifically prescribed precautions against COVID-19. The employee, Brad Amos, stated he was following the Golden Rule in protecting others from the virus. The lawsuit said Dave Ramsey ran a "cult-like" environment where employees who worried about the pandemic were accused of "weakness of spirit" and told to pray if they wanted to ward off the virus. Ramsey Solutions has denied all accusations and has claimed the suit was "completely false." In December 2023, A U.S. district judge dismissed the lawsuit, ruling there was no proof of religious discrimination. But in August 2024, the United States Court of Appeals for the Sixth Circuit overturned the dismissal, allowing the case to proceed.

In April 2023, a group of listeners of The Ramsey Show filed a $150 million lawsuit against Ramsey Solutions alleging Ramsey received $30 million to promote a timeshare exit company who engaged in deceptive practices. Ramsey Solutions disputes the allegations and is currently fighting the litigation. In December 2023, a U.S. district judge allowed the lawsuit to move forward, though one of the claims was dismissed.

Also in 2023, Daniel Ramsey was named president of the company, with the goal of eventually succeeding his father as CEO. Ramsey's two other children, Rachel Cruze and Denise Whittemore, also work for the company.

== Business model ==
Dave Ramsey has described the company as a ministry that uses practical, Biblical advice to encourage an further exploration into Christian teachings. On its website, Ramsey Solutions outlines to job candidates that employees are expected to uphold moral standards based on traditional Christian values, including codes against gossip and a focus on family life. All company operations are debt-free and the company is privately owned by Dave Ramsey and his family.

=== Ramsey Personalities ===
Since 2012, the company has hired public communicators known as Ramsey Personalities to deliver its teachings across various media—including co-hosting The Ramsey Show with Dave Ramsey. They include:

- Rachel Cruze
- George Kamel
- Jade Warshaw
- Ken Coleman (left on April 27th 2026)
- Dr. John Delony
- Eddie Culin

== Divisions, products, and services ==
Ramsey Solutions offers products and services in personal finance, leadership development, interpersonal relationships, and professional development. They include:

Financial Peace University: Ramsey Solutions’ original personal finance course, based on Dave Ramsey's “Baby Steps”—a step-by-step system for financial stability and wealth building.

EveryDollar: A budgeting app based on the zero-based budgeting method.

Ramsey Network: The company's media arm, producing podcasts and video content across platforms. Notable shows include:

- The Ramsey Show
- Front Row Seat
- The Dr. John Delony Show

Ramsey Press: The company's publishing division, producing works from Dave Ramsey and other Ramsey Personalities on topics such as finance, career development, and mental health. Notable books include:

- Dave Ramsey’s Complete Guide to Money (2011)
- Smart Money Smart Kids (2014)
- Baby Steps Millionaires (2022)
- Building a Non-Anxious Life (2023)
- Building a Business You Love (2025)

Ramsey Education: Financial literacy curricula for schools under the Foundations in Personal Finance brand, available for K–12 and college students.

SmartDollar: An employee financial wellness program that includes budget coaching, digital tools, and workshops.

RamseyTrusted and SmartVestor: Referral networks for real estate agents, tax professionals, and investment advisors.

EntreLeadership: A business coaching and leadership program, including workshops and an annual summit.

Coaching: Programs for financial, executive, and business coaching delivered through a network of trained professionals.

Live events: Conferences, workshops, and seminars featuring Ramsey Personalities and guest experts. The EntreLeadership Summit is one of the company's most prominent events.

== Efficacy of teachings ==
Critics of Ramsey Solutions argue that its advice may not account for economic inequality or complex financial circumstances. The “debt snowball” method has been both praised and challenged for its behavioral effectiveness versus financial efficiency.

Ramsey's investment advice has also been scrutinized for relying heavily on stock mutual funds, promoting load fees, and citing historically high returns (12%), which some financial professionals consider unrealistic.
