= Akil Patterson =

American football player and wrestler (born 1983)

- Born: January 1, 1983 (age 43); Buffalo, New York
- Education: University of Maryland, College Park; California University of Pennsylvania; Washington University in St. Louis
- Occupations: Youth Programs Coordinator, Athlete Ally & Community Organizer, Sugar Free Kids

Akil Sadiki Patterson (born January 1, 1983) is an American former college football player and former wrestler, and advocate for LGBT athletes.

== Early life ==
Patterson attended Frederick High School in Maryland. He attended the University of Maryland, but left in 2003. He attended the California University of Pennsylvania. In 2006, he graduated with a B.S. in sports management.

== Post-graduation ==
Patterson came from a wrestling family. He began training as a Greco-Roman wrestler and joined the Terrapins wrestling team at the University of Maryland as a volunteer coach. He led the Terrapin Wrestling Club, which trains young athletes.

In 2020, Mr. Patterson ran in the 13th district for the Baltimore City Council, but was unsuccessful.

Patterson is the community affairs coordinator at Athlete Ally.

In 2022, Patterson became a Social Equity and Economic Development manager.

== Professional recognition ==
Patterson has been featured in The Advocate's 40 under 40 issue.
