= Hudson Taylor (wrestler) =

American wrestler

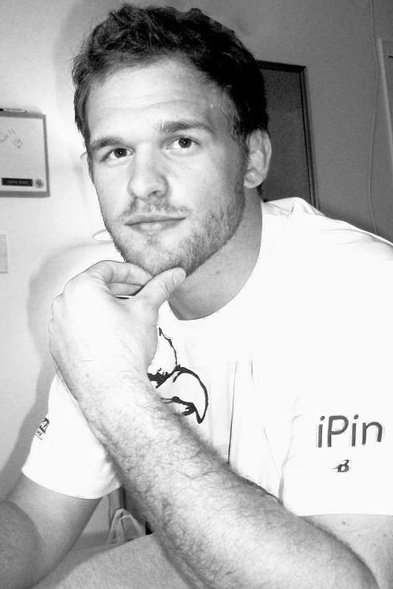
- Taylor in 2011

Personal information
- Full name: Herbert Hudson Taylor IV
- Born: January 13, 1987 (age 39) Pennington, New Jersey, U.S.
- Education: University of Maryland, College Park
- Occupation(s): Founding executive director, Athlete Ally
- Spouse: Lia Alexandra Mandaglio
Medal record
Collegiate Wrestling
Representing the Maryland Terrapins
NCAA Division I Championships
Bronze medal – third place	2008 St. Louis	197 lb
Bronze medal – third place	2009 St. Louis	197 lb

Herbert Hudson Taylor IV (born January 13, 1987) is an American wrestler and submission grappler, and the founder and executive director of Athlete Ally, a former wrestling coach at Columbia University

== Athletic career ==
Taylor thrice gained the status of NCAA All-American wrestler before graduating and becoming a coach at Columbia University. He also secured the most pins and the most wins in the history of collegiate wrestling at the University of Maryland, College Park and is ranked among the top five pinners in NCAA wrestling history. He holds several hall-of-fame records Taylor also trains in Brazilian jiu-jitsu and has competed in several tournaments in the colored belt divisions, winning the IBJJF World No-Gi Championship in the purple belt division in 2017.

== Advocacy ==
Taylor is descended from a long line of Christian missionaries, including James Hudson Taylor, who founded the China Inland Mission during the 19th century in China. While he has had disagreements with his parents over religion, it instilled in him a "strong sense of inclusion over exclusion."

Taylor experienced denigrating humor in high school and college sports, but befriended gay people when he majored in Interactive Performance Art at the University of Maryland. When Taylor began to wear an equality sticker from the Human Rights Campaign on his wrestling headgear, he faced backlash from his peers, but gained attention from the media. When he blogged about experiencing homophobia in collegiate sports, he received hundreds of emails from closeted athletes. This experience eventually encouraged him to found the not-for-profit organization, Athlete Ally, "with the mission of educating, encouraging and empowering straight athlete allies to combat homophobia and transphobia in sports."

"For me and my generation, LGBT rights is a pressing issue," said Taylor. "I believe that whatever history I'm a part of, I'm responsible for. If I feel something is unjust or unequal, I feel a responsibility to do something about it."

Taylor continues to spread his message of equality and inclusion as the founder and executive director of Athlete Ally as well as a public speaker and recurring blogger for the Huffington Post.

== Awards and recognition ==
In 2010, Taylor was named by The Advocate as one of the "Top 150 Reasons to Have Gay Pride".

Following his founding of Athlete Ally in 2011, Taylor received the PFLAG Straight for Equality Award with Rosie Perez and Charlaine Harris and was named "Greatest Person of the Day" on April 8 by the Huffington Post. Later that year, Taylor was honored by Buick and the NCAA alongside Eunice Kennedy Shriver and other advocates in sports.

His work is now featured in a permanent installation in Make a Difference! The Harvey L. Miller Family Youth Exhibition at the Illinois Holocaust Museum and Education Center, which aims to empower young persons to stand as leaders against discrimination.

In April 2012, Taylor was named University of Maryland Alumnus of the Year for the school of undergraduate studies for his work as an LGBTQ rights activist.

Taylor received an Emery Award in November 2013 from the Hetrick Martin Institute.
