= Dave Ramsey =

American financial advisor, author and radio personality (born 1960)

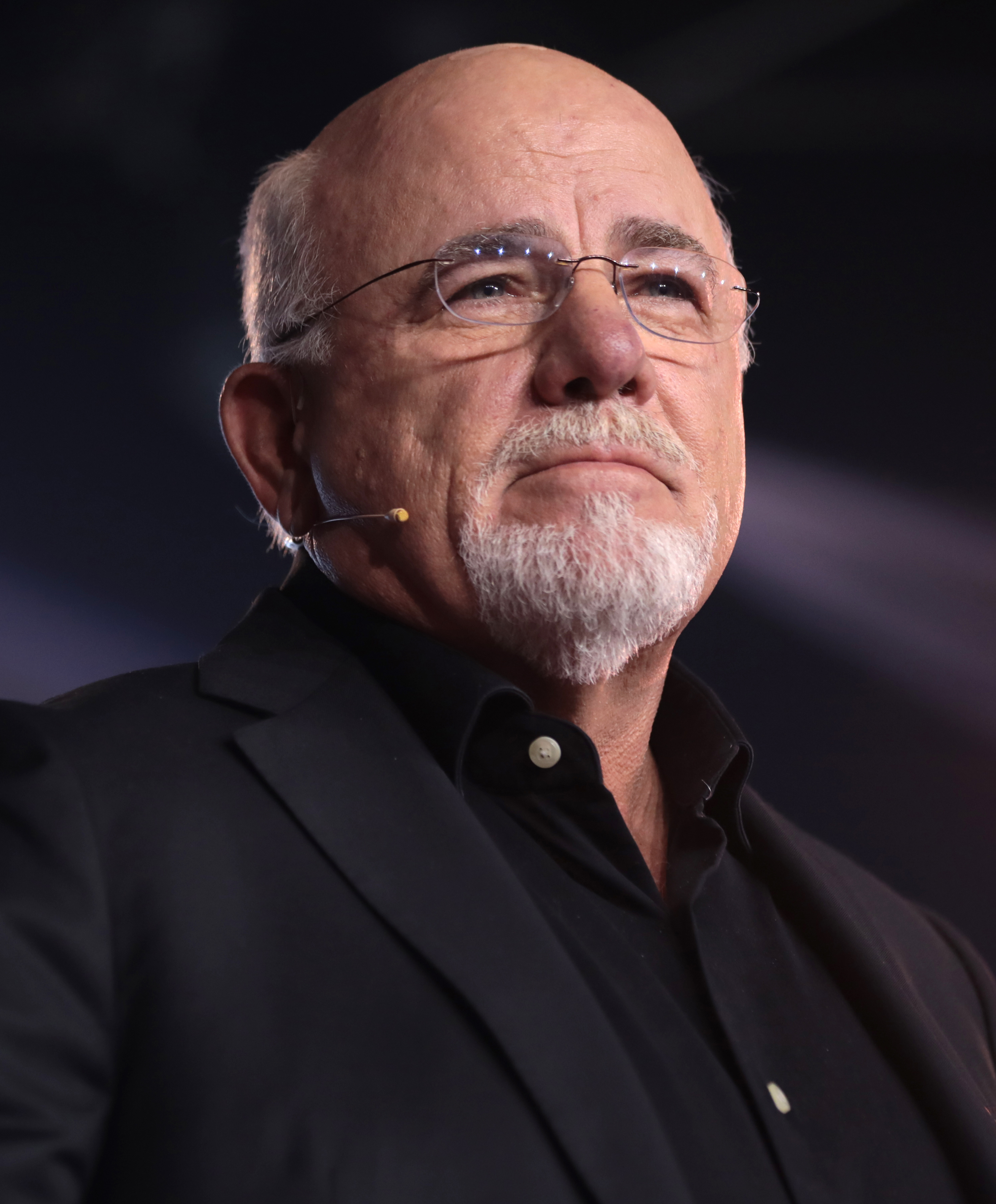
- Ramsey in 2023
- Born: David Lawrence Ramsey III; September 3, 1960 (age 66); Maryville, Tennessee, U.S.
- Education: University of Tennessee (BS)
- Occupations: Personal finance consultant; radio show host; author
- Spouse: Sharon Ramsey (m. 1982)
- Children: 3
- Writing career
- Genres: Personal finance; financial literacy; debt management
- Subject: Personal finance
- Notable work: The Total Money Makeover
- Website: www.ramseysolutions.com

David Lawrence Ramsey III (born September 3, 1960) is an American radio personality who offers financial advice. He co-hosts the nationally syndicated radio program The Ramsey Show, and is the founder and CEO of Ramsey Solutions. Ramsey has written several books, including The New York Times bestseller The Total Money Makeover, and hosted a television show on Fox Business from 2007 to 2010.

== Early life and education ==
Ramsey was born on September 3, 1960, in Maryville, Tennessee, to parents who worked in the real estate industry. He was raised in the Antioch neighborhood of Nashville and graduated from Antioch High School. At age 18, Ramsey took the real estate exam and began buying and selling property while attending the University of Tennessee at Knoxville, where he earned a Bachelor of Science degree in finance and real estate.

== Career ==
By 1986, Ramsey had accumulated a real estate portfolio valued at over $4 million. However, when his primary lender for his portfolio was sold off to another financial institution, the new owners called in all his promissory notes at once, and since he was unable to pay them off, he filed for chapter 7 bankruptcy in 1988.

While rebuilding his personal finances, Ramsey began providing financial counseling sessions at his church. In 1991, seeing his demand for counseling grow, he formed the Lampo Group (now known as Ramsey Solutions) to begin providing counseling professionally. Ramsey wrote and self-published his first book, Financial Peace, in 1992.

By 1996, Ramsey was the solo host and the show was eventually renamed The Dave Ramsey Show three years later.

In 1994, Ramsey introduced Financial Peace University, his nine-lesson course on personal finance.

In 2004, the Gannett newspaper group dropped Ramsey's financial advice column after discovering that the names in readers' letters had been changed without disclosure. Ramsey responded by offering to pay Gannett their money back.

In October 2007, Ramsey took his radio show to television with The Dave Ramsey Show on Fox Business, which aired until 2010.

During the COVID-19 pandemic, Ramsey opposed public health measures such as mask mandates, referring to them as "a sign of fear". On his March 2, 2020, show, Ramsey dismissed refund requests for his upcoming live events, calling those who sought them "wusses" and stated that he would attend an event "by my freaking self" if necessary.

In February 2021, Ramsey told Fox News that he did not support stimulus checks, saying, "If $600 or $1,400 changes your life you were pretty much screwed already. You got other issues going on."

== Teachings and criticisms ==
One of Ramsey's central strategies is the "debt snowball" method, in which individuals pay off smaller debts first to gain momentum before tackling larger ones, regardless of interest rates. He discourages the use of credit cards, and frequently demonstrates his adherence to this philosophy by showing the only cards he carries: two debit cards, a driver's license, and a concealed-carry permit.

Economists and financial professionals have criticized aspects of Ramsey's teachings for diverging from mainstream economic theory. His advice to avoid borrowing during economic downturns runs counter to the concept of consumption smoothing, which suggests that individuals should borrow early in life and save during peak earning years.

Critics also argue that Ramsey's approach may not account for income inequality, emergency financial needs, or long-term investment strategies. Ramsey's investing advice has been challenged for its emphasis on stock-based mutual funds with load fees, and claims of consistent 12% annual returns on investments, which critics view as unrealistic.

American journalist Helaine Olen argued in her book, Pound Foolish, that some of Ramsey's financial advice "doesn't even work on a base, mathematical level".

== Personal life ==
Ramsey married his wife, Sharon, on June 26, 1982. The Ramseys have three children: Denise Whittemore, Rachel Cruze, and Daniel Ramsey. All three work for Ramsey Solutions.

Ramsey was inducted into the National Radio Hall of Fame in 2015.

As of 2018, Ramsey had an estimated net worth of $55 million. In 2021, he sold his custom-built home in Franklin, Tennessee, for $10.2 million and began construction on a new home in the area.

Ramsey is an evangelical Christian and described himself as fiscally and socially conservative. He has blamed politics for what he considers Americans' economic dependence, and has said presidents should do "as little as possible" about the economy.

Ramsey supported Donald Trump in the 2024 United States presidential election.

== Selected works ==
- Financial Peace (1992)
- More Than Enough (1999)
- Financial Peace Revisited (2002)
- The Total Money Makeover (2003)
- Dave Ramsey's Complete Guide to Money (2011)
- EntreLeadership (2011)
- Smart Money Smart Kids (with Rachel Cruze, 2014)
- The Legacy Journey (2014)
- Baby Steps Millionaires (2021)
- Build a Business You Love (2025)
