= The Total Money Makeover =

Personal finance book

- Author: Dave Ramsey
- Language: English
- Genre: Personal finance, Debt
- Publisher: Thomas Nelson
- Publication date: 2003
- Publication place: United States
- Media type: Print Hardcover, audiobook and ebook
- Pages: 237
- ISBN: 9781595555274 (hardback)

The Total Money Makeover: A Proven Plan for Financial Fitness is a personal finance book written by Dave Ramsey that was first published in 2003. An updated edition was published in 2007 and 2013. It proposes methods of getting out of debt, staying out of debt, and corrects myths about money.

== Summary ==
The Total Money Makeover teaches how to get out of debt, how to budget, and corrects money myths. The book teaches the seven "baby steps" to follow in order to achieve financial stability, planning ahead for upcoming financial events, like retirement, and shares stories of individuals and couples that have done so successfully using The Total Money Makeover.

The seven baby steps are:

1. Save a $1,000 beginner emergency fund.
2. Get out of debt using the debt-snowball method. This means to list all debts arranging them by smallest to largest amount. Make only the minimum payments on all except the smallest debt. Use any available money to pay as much as possible to the smallest debt. When the smallest debt is paid off, add that money to the payments of the next smallest debt. Repeat until all debts except the house mortgage are paid off.
3. Save a proper emergency fund that is 3-6 months of expenses.
4. Invest 15% of household income for retirement.
5. Save for children's college.
6. Pay off the home early.
7. Build wealth and be generous.

== Reception ==
As of August 2017, over five million copies have been sold and the book has been on The Wall Street Journal bestsellers list for over 500 weeks.

Jamie Johnson's review for Bankrate stated that, "If you've been struggling with debt and need a step-by-step plan for how to pay it off, The Total Money Makeover gives you precisely that."

Kathleen Elkins and Libby Kane wrote for Business Insider, "Financial guru Dave Ramsey doesn't shower his readers with quick fixes in The Total Money Makeover. He provides a bold approach to finance matters and gets to the bottom of money problems: you."

In a 2019 New York Times column, Paul B. Brown wrote that Ramsey "has one major theme, which he hammers home until you want to scream," namely eliminating debt "to the exclusion of virtually everything."

Brown said he did not agree with Ramsey's advice that people with any debt should forgo an employer 401(k) match, writing that "financially, that makes no sense" except in extreme interest-rate cases, and called the advice "one of the many things I didn't like about the book."
