= Elmo Natali Student Center =

Coordinates: 40.0632°N 79.8849°W

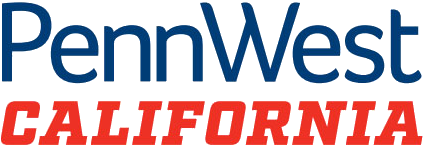

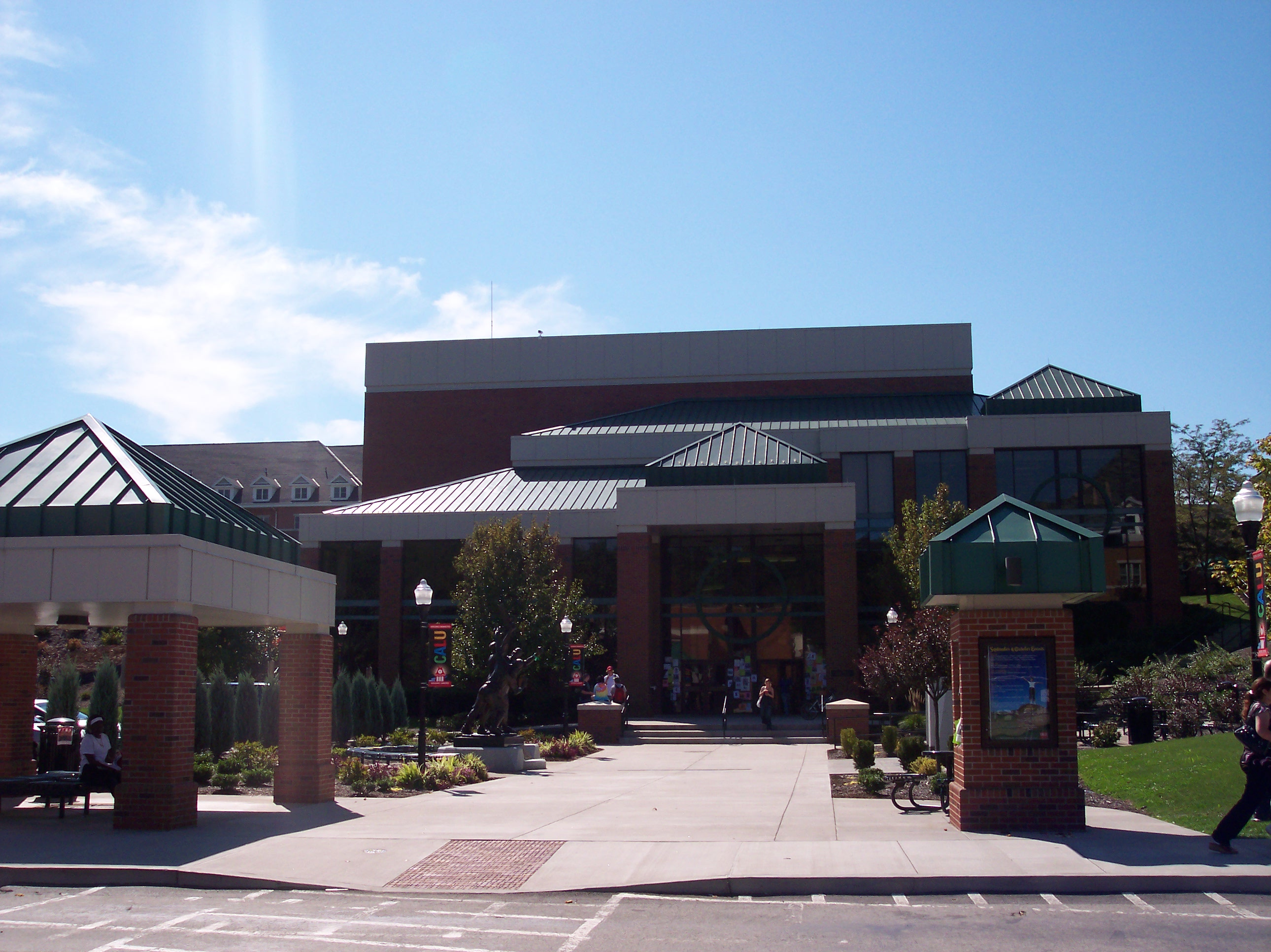
- The building pictured in 2003
- Interactive map of the Elmo Natali Student Center area
- Former names: California Memorial Union
- Alternative names: The union

General information
- Type: Student union
- Location: Washington County, Pennsylvania, California, PA, United States
- Construction started: 1969
- Completed: 1970
- Renovated: 1992
- Cost: $1.65 million
- Renovation cost: $8.1 million

Technical details
- Floor count: 4
- Lifts/elevators: 2

Design and construction
- Architecture firm: Williams, Trebilcock and Whitehead (WTW)
- Main contractor: Nello Construction Company
- Awards: Associated Builders and Contractors of Western PA Project of the Year; AS&U Educational Interiors Showcase Silver Citation

The Elmo Natali Student Center, commonly referred to as The Union, is the student union building centrally located on the campus of California University of Pennsylvania (CALU). Originally built in 1968, and renovated and expanded in 1992, the Natali Student Center is home to a large variety of student facilities and activities.

Groundbreaking to begin a 40,000-square-foot addition and 60,000-square-feet of renovations to the Center took place on May 20, 2013. Pittsburgh, Pennsylvania-based WTW Architects is the architect of record while Nello Construction, headquartered in Canonsburg, Pennsylvania, is serving as the general contractor. The four-level facility will undergo a transformation to create a central public space for the CALU campus. The two main lobbies located on each end of the building will be replaced with a rotunda, stretching 50 to 60 feet in diameter. This will serve as the central gathering place. In addition, the updated facility will include collaborative tech stations (or "collaboration pods"), in which small groups of students can work together on projects.

The Center’s updates will also accommodate CALU’s new food service program which features electronic ordering as well as sustainable dining. Sustainability will be accomplished through the use of energy efficient equipment as well as purchasing local produce. The project renovation is expected to be completed by July 2015.

== Elmo Natali ==
The Natali Student Center is named for former Vice President of Student Services, Elmo Natali, whose connection with the university spans more than 50 years. Natali first came to Cal when he transferred from Virginia Tech in the early 1950s and he remained until his retirement in 1992. Although he was a star running back, an all American, and a record holder for yards rushed in a single season (over 1,000), Natali is best remembered as a popular Vice President of Student Affairs.

== History ==
- May 1968

California Memorial Union building plans revealed. The plans include a cafeteria, snack bar, two dark rooms, two radio stations, and a billiard room. Students are expected to pay $10 a semester. The building is designed by Pittsburgh architect, Norman Frey. Estimates for building costs are approximately $1 million.

- August 12, 1969

Groundbreaking ceremonies of California Memorial Student Union are held. The cost is approximately $1,398,210.00 to build and $277,000 to furnish. The General State Authority will cover most of the costs, with the exception of air conditioning, carpeting, and kitchen equipment, which would be paid out of the Student Activities Capital Fund, covers the costs.

- December 1970

California Memorial Union opened.

- August 18, 1972

The students dedicate the Student Memorial Union.

- February 18, 1980

The Gold Rush opens as a multi-purpose entertainment facility. The room also features an elevated stage and a dance floor. In addition to live entertainment, movies would be shown weekly for student entertainment.

- April 26, 1980

African-American students hold a sit-in, demanding more entertainment geared toward them.

- 1985

Union Station snack bar remodeled. The Union Station would service students every day of the week.

- 1986

Martin Luther King, Jr. dedication at the Student Union.

- December 7 and 8, 1989

A referendum for the Student Union renovation and expansion was held by Student Government and the SAI board and passed.

- May, 1991

Phase I of the Student Union II project was started, which includes a new addition of 40,000 square feet.

- May 15, 1992

New addition to the Student Union is completed. 40,000 square feet had been added to the existing structure.

- August 30, 1992

The Elmo Natali Student Center’s renovation is completed and opened, effectively changing the name of the building from the California Memorial Union. In the expansion, the Vulcan Theatre is added, which seats 143 students. The building is dedicated to Elmo Natali, former vice-president of student affairs. It is later named Project of the Year, awarded by the Associated Builders and Contractors of Western PA. At the time, the Elmo Natali Student Center was the largest union in Pennsylvania. The architectural firm Williams, Trebilcock and Whitehead (WTW) designed the new student union based on a poll of students. The new building contained a number of recreational activities for students. Included in these activities was the Vulcan Theatre, which holds 143 people and would show a new movie every week, the Phillipsburg Performance Center, billiards room and table tennis on the first floor, and video games and pinball machines in the game room. Additionally, the commuter center was relocated from Herron Hall to a new home on the second floor of the union, where a portion of the current Gold Rush is now located.

- 1994

Elmo Natali Student Center named the AS&U Educational Interiors Showcase Silver Citation, which recognized the union for educational interior design excellence in American School and University.

- January 6, 1997

Efforts to repair a “heaving slab” problem on the Natali Student Center’s lower level begin. The lower level is closed for the duration of the repairs. The problem stems from pyrite pushing upwards on the ground level of the student center.

- July 1997

The lower level of the Natali Student Center reopens following the repair of the heaving slab problem.

- 1998

Prompted by student feedback, dining services moved from Gallagher Hall to the Natali Student Center, necessitating an addition to the Gold Rush, which then became the main eatery for students. Previous to this time, the Gold Rush served only as a lunch option for students. The Natali Student Center now provides all of the dining services to students. In the expansion of the Gold Rush, the commuter center was moved to its present location on the first floor, which in turn moved the billiards room across the hall. In the move, the arcade was eliminated. Additionally, the media suites received an expansion including the area of the current radio and T.V. station.

- September 22, 2001

A sculpture outside the Natali Student Center commemorating the Cal U Women’s Softball National Championship of 1997 and 1998 is dedicated.

- 2007

Elmo Natali Student Center C-Store Convenience store is remodeled into Flatz. Flatz retains the C-Store’s convenience products, but includes gourmet flatbread sandwiches or quesadillas heated on a Panini press.

- Fall 2009

The Billiard Room is reduced to accommodate Prime House Subs, which opens featuring sandwiches, subs, grab-and-go sushi, vegetarian options, breakfast sandwiches, and omelets.

- February 14 and 15, 2011

Referendum is held to determine if students wanted a renovation of the Natali Student Center and passes overwhelmingly.

- December 2011

Natali Performance Center receives a full audio and visual upgrade to include three high-definition projectors, new sound system, and high tech lecterns. The Vulcan Theatre also receives an audio and video upgrade, including Dolby Surround Sound and high definition video. Movies are now played 2-3 times a day, depending on the day.

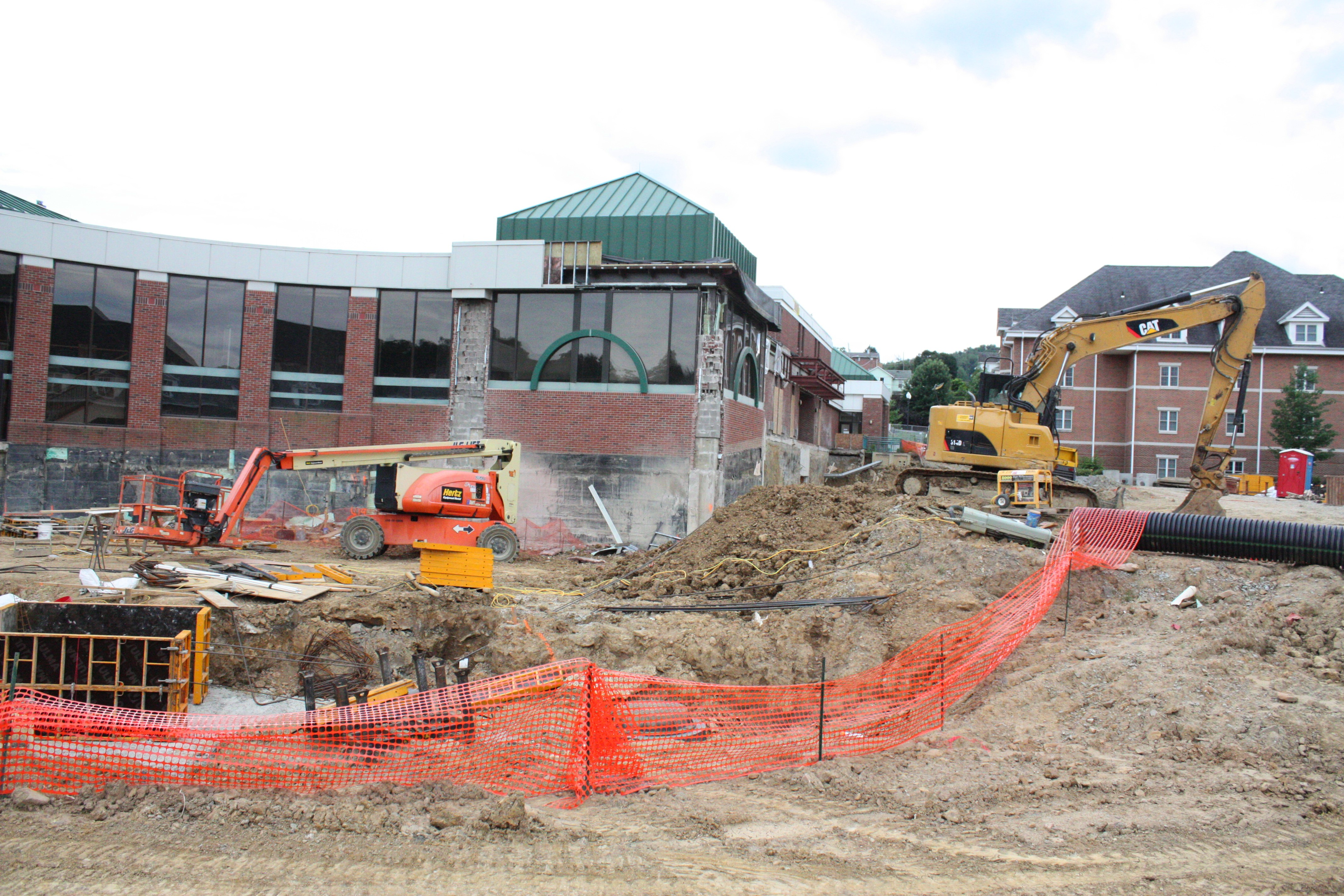
Groundbreaking to begin a new addition and renovations to the Elmo Natali Student Center took place on May 20, 2013.

- May 2013

Groundbreaking to begin a 40,000-square-foot addition and 60,000-square-feet of renovations to the Center took place on May 20, 2013. Pittsburgh, Pennsylvania-based WTW Architects is the architect of record while Nello Construction, headquartered in Canonsburg, Pennsylvania, is serving as the general contractor. The four-level facility will undergo a transformation to create a central public space for the CALU campus. The project renovation is expected to be completed by July 2015.

== Lower lobby ==
The lower lobby of the building is where the Student Center management offices are located, including the Associate Vice-President for Student Affairs, as well as information desk. In addition, the PSECU office and ATM are located on the ground floor.

== First floor ==
The first floor of the building is home to various student activities and organizations, including the Commuter Center and billiards room. The Vulcan Theater, a full screening room, plays recent movies daily at no charge to students throughout the school year. Taylor & Byrnes offers students a selection of coffee and made-to-order sandwiches. Flatz, which opened in October 2007, operates as a miniature convenience store where students can purchase meals and groceries. The first floor also is home to the Multimedia Access Center, a computer lab for student use, which offers web, print, and photography services for students, faculty, and staff, in addition to housing the office for the Activities Transcript. Across from the Access Center is the Cal Bookstore, which sells books, clothes, gifts and other Cal U merchandise. The Cal bookstore is operated by Follett Higher Education Group. The back hallway hosts various offices, including the Campus Ministry, Dining Services, Service Fraternities, and Media.

== Media suite ==

The California University Media Suite hosts both CUTV and WCAL studios. WCAL, the college radio station allows students to experience working and operating a radio station. WCAL plays a wide variety of music as well as live broadcasts of various Cal U sporting events. CUTV is considered one of the Student television stations in the United States. CUTV broadcasts NewsCenter live each Thursday, as well as several other sports and local talk shows. CUTV also broadcasts all of the Cal Vulcans football games, as well as various other sporting events throughout the school year. Back the hall is the Cal Times office, which produces a campus newspaper each week.

== Second floor ==
The second floor of the building includes a Food Court, which includes locations that offer sandwiches, burgers, and fries, made-to-order wraps and salads, pizza, toasted grinders, panini sandwiches and homemade baked pastas. In addition to the Food Court, the second floor includes the Performance Center, where various speakers and performances take place throughout the school year. There are also two meeting rooms for student organizations and other groups that can be opened into one large room to accommodate larger gatherings. The Gold Rush is located in the rear of the building. The central dining room of the campus, the Gold Rush offers three meals per day for students in an all-you-care-to-eat buffet. Five serving areas are included in the Gold Rush, including Fusion, Deli, Pasta, Entree and Bakery.

Also located on the second floor is the Student Affairs suite, which includes the office of the Vice-President for Student Affairs and the Dean of Student Conduct.

== Third floor ==
The third floor of the Student Center is home to the Student Association offices, Student Activities offices, and the Greek Life Offices.
