= List of PennWest Edinboro alumni =

List of notable graduates from Pennsylvania Western University, Edinboro

Pennsylvania Western University, Edinboro (PennWest Edinboro) is a public university located in Edinboro, Pennsylvania. It was previously known as Edinboro Academy, Northwest State Normal School, Edinboro State Normal School, Edinboro State Teachers College, Edinboro State College, and Edinboro University of Pennsylvania. Following are some of its notable alumni and non-graduating attendees.

== Art and architecture ==
| Names | Class | Major | Notability | References |
|---|---|---|---|---|
| John Silk Deckard | | Non-degreed | Artist and sculptor | |
| Marcia Mead | 1898 | | Architect known for taking a neighborhood-centered approach to the design of low-cost housing | |
| Tara Seibel | 1996 | Applied media arts | Cartoonist, graphic designer, and illustrator | |

== Business ==
| Names | Class | Major | Notability | References |
|---|---|---|---|---|
| Joseph Newton Pew | 1886 | | Founder of Sun Oil Company, now Sunoco | |
| Mike Zafirovski | 1975 | Mathematics | Former CEO of Nortel Networks and former president of Motorola | |

== Education ==
| Names | Class | Major | Notability | References |
|---|---|---|---|---|
| Gertrude A. Barber | | | Founded the Barber National Institute | |
| Thomas James Bernatowicz | | BS | Physicist at Washington University in St. Louis | |
| Robert Carothers | 1965 | English | President of University of Rhode Island, 1991–2009 | |
| Peggy Cebe | 1970, 1976 | Physics BSEd, Mathematics MS | Professor of physics at Tufts University | |
| Eugene Eubanks | 1963 | | Professor and school administrator | |
| LaToya Ruby Frazier | 2004 | Photography and graphic design | Photographer and professor of photography at the School of the Art Institute of Chicago | |
| James T. Harris III | | MEd educational administration | President of University of San Diego and former president of Widener University and Defiance College | |
| Merritt Eldred Hoag | | | Former president of University of North Georgia and mayor of Young Harris, Georgia | |
| James Franklin Record | | | Former president of Pikeville College | |
| Laura Temple | | Non-degreed | Founder and president of an industrial school for women in Mexico | |
| James Troha | | Criminal justice BA, counseling MA | President of Juniata College in Huntingdon, former president of Heidelberg University in Tiffin | |

== Entertainment ==
| Names | Class | Major | Notability | References |
|---|---|---|---|---|
| Jack R. Anderson | 1972 | MA Music | Former director of the University of Pittsburgh Varsity Marching Band | |
| Dave Filoni | 1996 | Applied media | Film writer and animator, director of Star Wars: The Clone Wars film and series | |
| Gene Ludwig | | Non-degreed | Jazz and rhythm and blues organist | |
| Pat Monahan | | Non-degreed | Lead singer of alternative-rock band Train | |
| Rajee Narinesingh | | | Transgender actress, activist, author, singer, and reality television personality | |
| Sharon Stone | | Non-degreed | Actress | |

== Military ==
| Names | Class | Major | Notability | References |
|---|---|---|---|---|
| Mari K. Eder | 1975 | English | Former United States Army major general | |

== Politics ==
| Names | Class | Major | Notability | References |
|---|---|---|---|---|
| Ryan Bizzarro | 2006, 2008 | Criminal justice AA, political science BA | Pennsylvania House of Representatives, 2013–present | |
| Karl Boyes | 1959 | BS | Pennsylvania House of Representatives, 1981–2003 | |
| Samuel Myron Brainerd | | | United States House of Representatives, 1883–1885 | |
| Henry Alden Clark | | Non-degreed | United States House of Representatives, 1917–1919 | |
| Kathy Dahlkemper | 1982 | Dietetics | United States House of Representatives, 2009–2011 | |
| Mary L. Doe | | | First president of the Michigan State Equal Suffrage Association | |
| John R. Evans | 1984, 1999 | Speech communication BA, MA communication studies | Pennsylvania House of Representatives, 2001–2013 | |
| Florindo Fabrizio | 1969 | Counseling M.Ed. | Pennsylvania House of Representatives, 2002–2018 | |
| Teresa Forcier | | Non-degreed | Pennsylvania House of Representatives, 1991–2006 | |
| Josephine Brawley Hughes | | | Suffragist and wife of Governor L. C. Hughes | |
| L. C. Hughes | | | Former governor of Arizona Territory | |
| Kenneth Jadlowiec | 1971 | | Pennsylvania House of Representatives, 1987–2002 | |
| Miles Brown Kitts | 1902 | | Pennsylvania State Senate, 1924–1932, mayor of Erie, Pennsylvania | |
| Sandra O'Brien | | Educational Administration M.Ed. | Ohio Senate, 2021–present | |
| Sean O'Brien | 1990 | Political Science | Ohio House of Representatives, 2011–2016, Ohio Senate, 2017–2020, and judge with the Trumbull County Common Pleas Court | |
| R. Tracy Seyfert | 1975 | MEd | Pennsylvania House of Representatives, 1997–2000 | |
| Milton W. Shreve | 1879 | | United States House of Representatives, 1913–1915 and 1919–1933 | |
| Keith Skelton | 1939 | | Oregon House of Representatives, 1957–1973 | |
| Tom Swift | 1965 | | Pennsylvania House of Representatives, 1979–1986 | |

== Religion ==
| Names | Class | Major | Notability | References |
|---|---|---|---|---|
| Adda Burch | | | Missionary and Woman's Christian Temperance Union leader | |
| Marie Helene Franey | | Non-degreed | Former superior general of the Sisters of Providence of Saint Mary-of-the-Woods | |
| Anthony Scharba | | | Primate of the Ukrainian Orthodox Church of the USA | |

== Science technology, and medicine ==
| Names | Class | Major | Notability | References |
|---|---|---|---|---|
| Kathryn Bowles | | Nursing | Prominent nurse | |
| Lori Diachin | 1988 | Mathematics | Computer scientist and deputy associate director for science and technology at the Lawrence Livermore National Laboratory | |
| William R. Jacobs Jr. | 1977 | Math | Biologist who genetically engineered mycobacterium, including tuberculosis | |
| Sian Proctor | 1992 | Geology and environmental science | Inspiration4 astronaut, and the first black female pilot on a spacecraft | |
| David Steadman | 1973 | Biology | Curator of Ornithology at the Florida Museum of Natural History at the University of Florida | |

== Sports ==
| Names | Class | Major | Notability | References |
|---|---|---|---|---|
| Leo Bemis | 1941 | | Former head coach of the University of Pittsburgh men's soccer team | |
| Jim Booros | | Non-degreed | Professional golfer | |
| Shawn Bunch | 2006 | | All-American wrestler and former MMA fighter | |
| Tommie Campbell | | Non-degreed | Former professional gridiron football player, most notably a member of the Tennessee Titans | |
| Mark Corey | 1995 | | Former professional baseball player for the New York Mets, Colorado Rockies, and Pittsburgh Pirates | |
| Denayne Dixon | | | Former AFL player | |
| Jakim Donaldson | | | Basketball player in the Israeli Basketball Premier League | |
| Walter Fletcher | | | Professional Canadian football running back for the Montreal Alouettes | |
| Gregor Gillespie | | | NCAA Champion wrestler and former Mixed Martial Artist in the UFC | |
| David Green | 1977 | | Former NFL and CFL football player, most notably as league MVP for the Montreal Alouettes | |
| Trevor Harris | | | Starting quarterback in the CFL for the Saskatchewan Roughriders | |
| Tom Herman | 1974 | Secondary social studies | College football coach at Gannon University | |
| Bill Holland | 1935 | | Former professional basketball player for the Warren Penns, Cleveland White Horses, and Detroit Eagles | |
| Richard Holmes | | | Professional football player in the Canadian Football League | |
| Chris Honeycutt | | | All-American wrestler and former MMA fighter for Bellator MMA | |
| Blair Hrovat | 2003 | Business | Former college football coach at Allegheny College | |
| Trevon Jenifer | | Criminal Justice | Paralympic wheelchair basketball player | |
| Mike Kelly | 1983 | Secondary school administration MEd | Football coach for numerous NCAA, CFL, and NFL teams | |
| Josh Koscheck | 2001 | | NCAA D-1 Wrestling Champion, mixed martial artist, former UFC Welterweight contender | |
| Matt Lynch | 2013 | Health and Physical Education | The only gay head coach in college men’s basketball | |
| Bob Lytle | 1940 | | Former professional basketball player for the Warren Penns | |
| D. K. McDonald | 2001 | | Prominent football coach at University of Kansas | |
| Peter Nyari | 1984 | | Former professional baseball player who competed in the 2004 Summer Olympics | |
| Jeremy O'Day | 1996 | | General manager and vice president of football operations of the Saskatchewan Roughriders and former CFL player | |
| Loyal K. Park | | | Former professional baseball player, college basketball coach, and college football coach | |
| Jim Romaniszyn | 1973 | | Former professional football player for the Cleveland Browns and New England Patriots | |
| Lou Rosselli | 1993 | | Olympic wrestler | |
| Danny Smith | 1976 | | Pittsburgh Steelers' special teams coordinator | |
| Justin Wilcox | | | Professional mixed martial artist formerly competing in Strikeforce and Bellator | |
| John Williams Jr. | | | Former CFL football player | |
| Maurice Williams | 2001 | | Professional football player for the Jacksonville Sharks | |

== Other ==
| Names | Class | Major | Notability | References |
|---|---|---|---|---|
| Vicki Van Meter | 2004 | Criminal justice | Youngest female pilot to cross the continental United States and to make a trans-Atlantic flight | |
