= Dale-Elizabeth Pehrsson =

American academic administrator

1st President of Pennsylvania Western University
- In office July 1, 2022 – July 1, 2023
- Preceded by: Position established
- Succeeded by: Laurie Bernotsky (interim)

Personal details
- Education: University at Albany, SUNY; Idaho State University

Dale-Elizabeth Pehrsson is an American academic administrator who was the founding president of Pennsylvania Western University from 2022 to 2023.

== Life ==
Pehrsson graduated from the University at Albany, SUNY. She earned master's degrees in counseling and education and a D.Ed. in counselor education and counseling from Idaho State University. Her 1991 dissertation was titled, Representational Theory of Play Therapy: The Development of a Theoretical Framework. Virginia B. Allen was her doctoral advisor.

In 1991, Pehrsson became a clinical supervisor for counselor education at Idaho State University. She was a faculty member at Oregon State University and Sam Houston State University. She was an associate dean of the college of education at the University of Nevada, Las Vegas. She worked as dean of the college of education and human services at Central Michigan University. In 2018, she joined the Pennsylvania State System of Higher Education as the president of Clarion University. She became the interim president of Edinboro University in December 2020 and of California University of Pennsylvania in July 2021. She served as president of the merger of three universities which unified as Pennsylvania Western University on July 1, 2022. On July 1, 2023, she resigned to serve as the president-in-resident and CEO of PennWest Investment with the Pennsylvania State System of Higher Education.
