= Narinesingh =

Narinesingh is a surname. Notable people with the surname include:

- Hansen Narinesingh, Trinidad and Tobago politician
- Rajee Narinesingh (born 1967), American actress and television personality

== See also ==
- Narine
- Singh
