= Guy Conti =

American baseball coach (1942–2026)

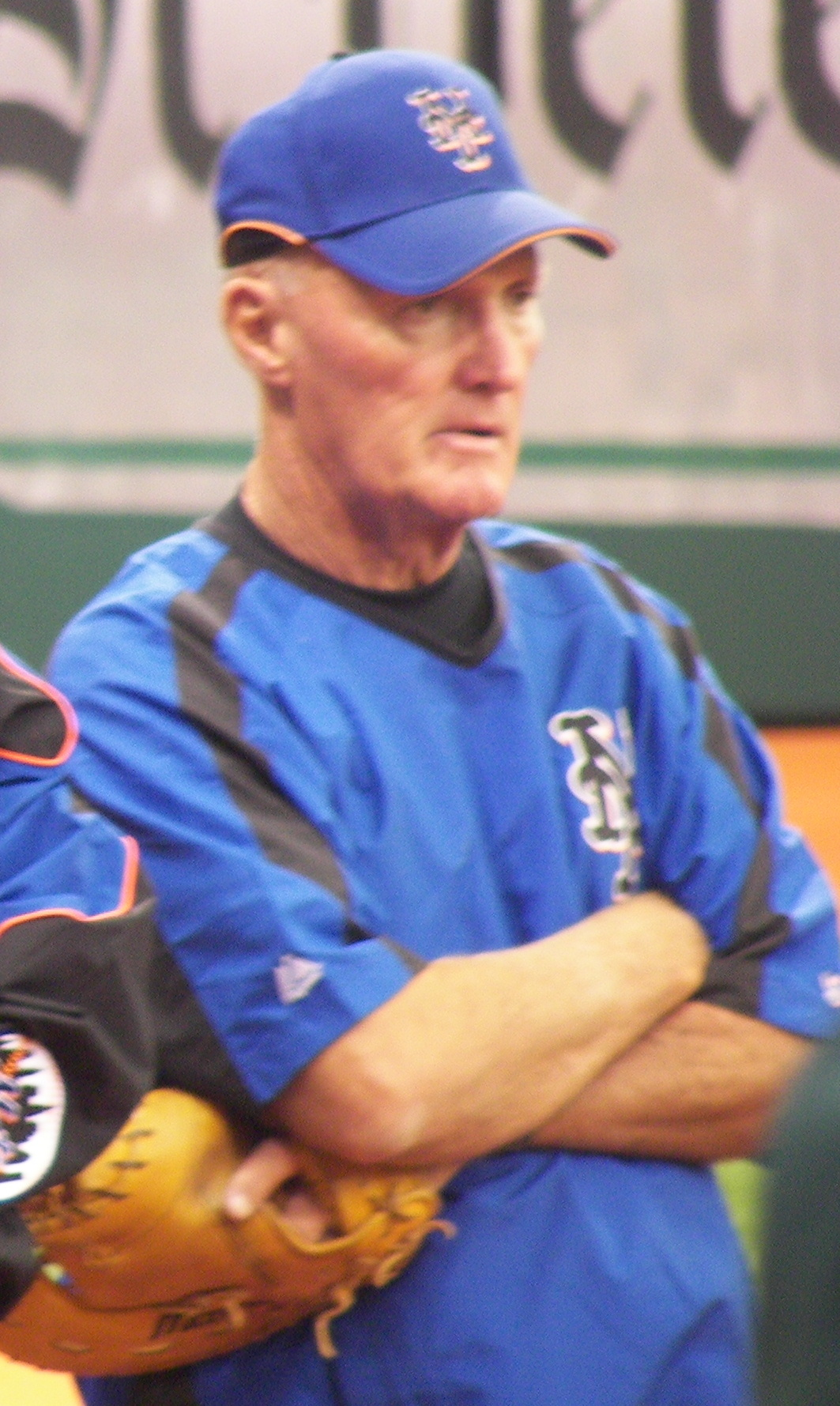
- Conti with the New York Mets in 2007
- Catcher / Coach
- Born: March 9, 1942; Pittsburgh, Pennsylvania, U.S.
- Died: October 13, 2026 (aged 84)
- Batted: Right Threw: Right

Guy Clyde Conti (March 9, 1942 – October 13, 2026) was an American baseball coach. He was a senior advisor and the former Major League Baseball bullpen coach for the New York Mets. He was one of Willie Randolph's first hires as manager in winter 2004 and began as a coach in the 2005 season.

Conti played baseball for one season at Clarion State College (now Clarion University) and returned to Clarion after his playing days earning a degree in 1965. He briefly played in the Houston Astros organization as a catcher, after which he coached basketball at Edinboro University of Pennsylvania. He also coached football at Northwestern High School in Albion, Pennsylvania in the 1960s and early 1970s.

He held various coaching positions in the Los Angeles Dodgers' minor league system, where he befriended Sandy Koufax and also worked with young pitchers such as Pedro Martínez and Ismael Valdez. Martinez credits Conti with teaching him English when Conti coached Martinez in Great Falls, Montana, calling him "my white daddy."

Conti died on October 13, 2026, at the age of 84.
