= Kathryn Bowles =

American nurse and Professor

Kathryn H. Bowles
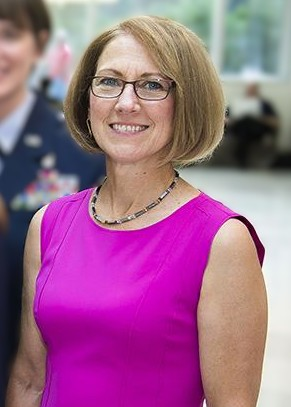
- Bowles in 2016
- Education: Pennsylvania Western University
- Scientific career
- Workplaces: University of Pennsylvania
- Thesis: An evaluation of the Omaha Classification System in the hospital care of the elderly (1996)

Kathryn H. Bowles is an American nurse who is Professor of Nursing at the University of Pennsylvania. Her research looks to improve outcomes for people discharged from hospital care. She is an elected member of the American College of Medical Informatics, American Nurses Association and National Academy of Medicine.

== Early life and education ==
Bowles studied at Pennsylvania Western University, where she majored in nursing. She worked as a nurse for several years, in Pennsylvania, Indiana and New York. She eventually returned to academia, and earned her doctorate at the University of Pennsylvania.

== Research and career ==
Bowles was a critical care nurse. In this capacity, she realized that hospital patients often did not possess enough knowledge to take care of themselves at home, and were often not referred to appropriate post-hospital care. This prompted her to research why older people return to the hospital after being discharged. She defined key risk factors (e.g. physical stability, length of stay in hospital, having a caregiver at home) that impacted the likelihood of additional hospital care following discharge.

Bowles created a methodology to identify which patients were most likely to experience poor discharge outcomes. In 2012, she founded a company to deliver this tool to hospitals and caregivers. Her Discharge Decision Support System is an assessment tool that has been shown to have a positive impact on readmissions.

== Awards and honors ==
- 2012 Elected to the American College of Medical Informatics
- 2017 Harriet H. Werley Award
- 2017 International Nurse Researcher Hall of Fame
- 2018 Claire M. Fagin Distinguished Researcher Award
- 2023 National Institute of Nursing Research Welch/Woerner Path-Paver Award
- 2024 Named Most Prolific Author in Nursing Informatics
- 2024 Elected member of the National Academy of Medicine

== Selected publications ==
- Steven Landers; Elizabeth Madigan; Bruce Leff; et al. (5 October 2016). "The Future of Home Health Care: A Strategic Framework for Optimizing Value". Home Health Care Management and Practice. 28 (4): 262–278. doi:10.1177/1084822316666368. ISSN 1084-8223. PMC 5052697. PMID 27746670. Wikidata Q37315176.
- Kathryn H. Dansky; Liisa Palmer; Dennis Shea; Kathryn H. Bowles (1 January 2001). "Cost analysis of telehomecare". Telemedicine and e-Health. 7 (3): 225–232. doi:10.1089/153056201316970920. ISSN 1556-3669. PMID 11564358. Wikidata Q39579949.
- Kathryn H Bowles; Mary D Naylor; Janice B Foust (1 February 2002). "Patient characteristics at hospital discharge and a comparison of home care referral decisions". Journal of the American Geriatrics Society. 50 (2): 336–342. doi:10.1046/j.1532-5415.2002.50067.x. ISSN 0002-8614. PMID 12028217. Wikidata Q39603607.
