= List of Bucknell Bison men's basketball head coaches =

The following is a list of Bucknell Bison men's basketball head coaches. The Bison have had 21 coaches in their 128-season history.

Bucknell's current head coach is John Griffin III. He was hired in March 2023 to replace Nathan Davis, who was fired at the end of the 2022–23 season.

No.	Tenure	Coach	Years	Record	Pct.
–	1895–1908	Student coaches	13	99–28	.780
1	1908–1911	George W. Hoskins	3	21–14	.600
2	1911–1912	C. Fulmer	1	10–6	.625
3	1912–1913	H. E. Zehner	1	4–13	.235
4	1913–1914	Dwite Shaffner	1	4–8	.333
5	1914–1917	George Cockill	3	26–19–1	.576
6	1917–1918; 1919–1920; 1925–1926; 1932–1942	Malcolm Musser	13	110–99	.526
7	1918–1919	Haps Benfer	1	12–4	.750
8	1920–1923	Clarence Glass	3	29–25	.537
9	1923–1925	Moose McCormick	2	2–10	.167
10	1926–1932	John Plant	6	59–49	.546
11	1942–1943	John Sitarsky	1	5–8	.385
12	1943–1947	J. Ellwood Ludwig	4	36–29	.554
13	1947–1952	Jack Guy	5	29–80	.266
14	1952–1962	Ben Kribbs	10	97–124	.439
15	1962–1964	Gene Evans	2	15–29	.341
16	1964–1972	Don Smith	8	82–105	.439
17	1972–1975	Jim Valvano	3	33–42	.440
18	1975–1994	Charlie Woollum	19	318–221	.590
19	1994–2008	Pat Flannery	14	234–178	.568
20	2008–2015	Dave Paulsen	7	134–94	.588
21	2015–2023	Nathan Davis	8	139–115	.547
22	2023–present	John Griffin III	1	0–0	–
Totals		22 coaches	128 seasons	1,488–1,300–1	.534
Records updated through end of 2022–23 season Source
