= Laurie Bernotsky =

American academic administrator

16th President of West Chester University
- Incumbent
- Assumed office July 1, 2024
- Preceded by: Christopher Fiorentino

Interim President of Pennsylvania Western University
- In office July 1, 2023 – June 2024
- Preceded by: Dale-Elizabeth Pehrsson
- Succeeded by: Jon Anderson

Personal details
- Born: 1966/1967 (age 58–59)
- Education: Temple University; University of Oxford

R. Lorraine Bernotsky (born 1966/1967) is an American academic administrator serving as the 16th president of West Chester University since 2024. She was previously the interim president of Pennsylvania Western University.

== Early life and education ==
Bernotsky was born in 1966 or 1967 and raised in rural Eastern Pennsylvania. She was a first-generation college student. She earned a master's degree in sociology from Temple University. She completed a master's degree and a DPhil in politics at the University of Oxford.

== Career ==
Berntosky joined West Chester University (WCU) in 1996 as a member of the political science faculty. She taught undergraduate and graduate courses on politics, research methods, and public administration. She was an associate provost and dean of the graduate school. During her tenure, the university added four doctoral programs and founded the center for social and economic policy research. Bernotsky became the provost in 2015 and executive vice president in 2017.

On July 1, 2023, she succeeded Dale-Elizabeth Pehrsson as the interim president of Pennsylvania Western University. She was succeeded by Jon Anderson.

In December 2023, Bernotsky was named as the 16th president of WCU. She is set to succeed Christopher Florentino on July 1, 2024.
