= Gertrude A. Barber =

American educator (1911–2000)

Servant of God Gertrude Agnes Barber
- Born: September 16, 1911; Erie, Erie County, Pennsylvania
- Died: April 29, 2000 (aged 88); Beckley, Raleigh County, West Virginia
- Honored in: Catholic Church

Gertrude Agnes Barber was an American educator and administrator who founded the Barber Center in 1952 to serve disabled children, adults, and families.

Born in 1911, she was the seventh of ten children of an Irish immigrant mother and first-generation Irish-American father. A Catholic, she attended Catholic elementary and high school and was a member of the same Catholic parish her entire life. She studied at Edinboro Normal School and Penn State University. She graduated from college in 1931 with a degree in elementary education. Because jobs were scarce during the Great Depression, her first job was as a substitute teacher with the Erie School District. In 1933, she became a full-time special education teacher. A decade later, she was appointed home and school visitor. It was in that capacity that Gertrude confronted the anguish and frustration that parents of children with disabilities felt when it came to pursuing an education for their children. And in 1945, after earning a master’s degree in psychology, she was appointed coordinator of the district’s special education programs.

She continued her own education and earned a PhD in education in 1956. And when the Erie School District leased the former Lakeview Hospital, Dr. Barber took on the task of converting the building into a special education school and adult workshop. The Dr. Gertrude A. Barber Center, gradually expanded and eventually became known as the Barber National Institute.

Dr. Gertrude Barber died in 2000. During her life, she received many awards and recognition. She served on a White House task force under President John F. Kennedy on the education of persons with intellectual disabilities. She contributed to the writing of the Americans with Disabilities Act and traveled to Washington, DC, when President George H. W. Bush signed it into law in 1990. She received many local and national honors. But the title dearest to her heart was “teacher.” Her cause for sainthood in the Catholic Church was opened in 2019 by the Diocese of Erie. In 2020, she was named Erie's "woman of the century".
