= James Troha =

American academic administrator

12th President of Juniata College
- Incumbent
- Assumed office June 2013
- Preceded by: Thomas R. Kepple, Jr.

President of Heidelberg University Interim
- In office 2008–2009
- Succeeded by: Robert H. Huntington

Personal details
- Born: Cleveland, Ohio, U.S.
- Education: Edinboro University (BA, MA); University of Kansas (PhD)

James Troha is an American academic administrator, currently serving as President of Juniata College in Huntingdon, Pennsylvania. Troha took office in 2013.

== Early life and education ==
Troha is a native of Cleveland, Ohio. He earned a Bachelor of Arts in criminal justice and master's degree in counseling from Edinboro University of Pennsylvania. He earned a PhD in educational policy from the University of Kansas.

== Career ==
Prior to assuming his role as president of Juniata College, Troha worked as an administrator at Heidelberg University, first as vice president for student affairs and dean of students, vice president for institutional advancement and university relations, and interim president from 2008 to 2009. From 2009 to 2013, he served as the university's vice president for institutional advancement and university relation. In 2013, it was announced that Troha has been selected by the Juniata College Board of Trustees to serve as the institution's 12th president. He took office on June 1, 2013.
