= Justin Moose (golfer) =

American World Long Drive competitor

Justin Moose (born January 6, 1986) is a World Long Drive competitor. Moose competes in events that are sanctioned by the World Long Drive Association, which is owned by Golf Channel, part of the NBC Sports Group, and a division of Comcast. The season-long schedule features events airing live on Golf Channel, culminating in the Volvik World Long Drive Championship in September.

Originally from outside of Pittsburgh, Pa., Moose resides in Columbia, S.C.

== World Long Drive career ==
Moose earned his first World Long Drive victory in 2018, claiming the East Coast Classic in Columbia, S.C., just down the road from his home. He also capped his 2018 season by finishing runner-up to Maurice Allen at the Volvik World Long Drive Championship (Thackerville, Okla.). It was the furthest Moose had ever advanced at the World Championship, after reaching the semifinals in 2016 before falling to eventual world champion Joe Miller.

In an interview with Golfworld in June 2018 during the Atlantic City Boardwalk Bash, Moose offered this description of World Long Drive as a sport: "It's golf mixed with NASCAR, wrestling and the Home Run Derby."

== Life before World Long Drive ==
Prior to competing in World Long Drive, Moose played on the men's golf team in college at Clarion University (Pennsylvania), and threw javelin in high school. He earned Pennsylvania State Athletic Conference Player of the Year honors at Clarion. He has qualified for three U.S. Open sectionals and plans to continue to pursue professional golf, while also being part of the WLD Tour. He also has perspective. “In Long Drive, I’m one of 10,” he said. “In golf, I’m one of 10,000.”

Moose credits much of his development in golf to advice from one of his mentors, former PGA Tour winner Rocco Mediate whom Moose caddied for as a youth in Greensburg, Pa.

A Pittsburgh area native and a lifelong Steelers fan, Moose is known to feverishly wave a “Terrible Towel” at each WLD event.
