= Peggy Cebe =

Professor of physics

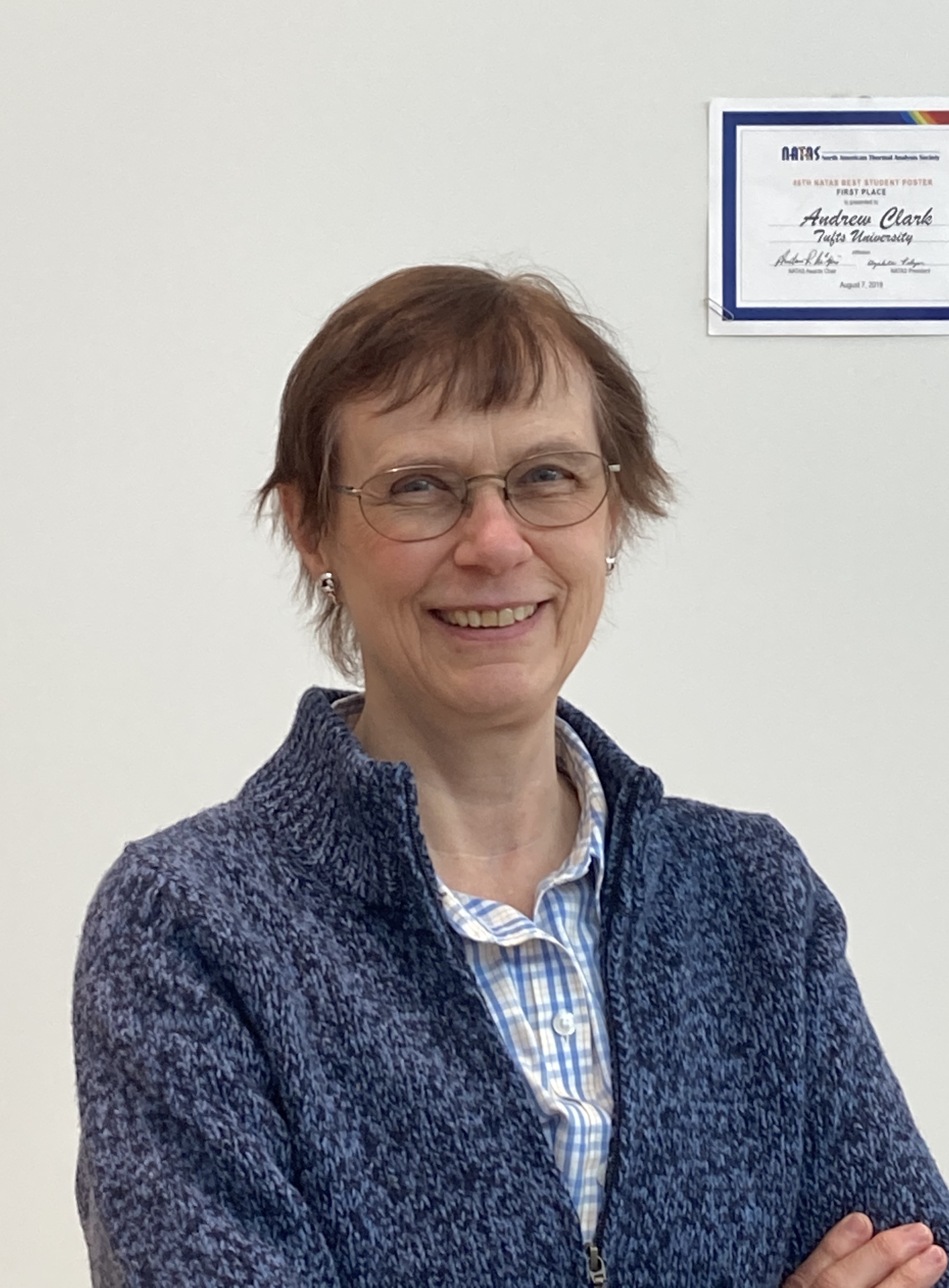
- Education: Edinboro University; Cornell University (Ph.D)
- Known for: Semicrystalline Polymers and Bioplymers
- Scientific career
- Fields: Physics
- Workplaces: Jet Propulsion Laboratory; Massachusetts Institute of Technology; Tufts University
- Doctoral advisor: David T. Grubb

Peggy Cebe (born in 1949) is a professor of physics in the Department of Physics and Astronomy of Tufts University.

== Early life ==
Cebe was born in Erie, Pennsylvania. She received her bachelor's degree (BSEd) from the Edinboro State College of Pennsylvania (currently known as Edinboro University of Pennsylvania) in 1970. She earned a MS in mathematics in 1976 from the same school. Cebe obtained a second MS in physics from Cornell University in 1981, followed by a PhD in physics in 1984, also from Cornell University.

== Career ==
After her PhD, Cebe moved to the Caltech/NASA Jet Propulsion Laboratory as a postdoctoral research associate. She then became a member of their technical staff and was promoted to technical group leader of the polymer physics group. In 1988, Cebe joined the department of materials science and engineering at Massachusetts Institute of Technology, studying the structure and properties of semi-crystalline polymers. In 1995, Cebe began her faculty position at Tufts University, in the department of physics and astronomy.

Cebe's research focuses on characterizing the structure and properties of semi-crystalline polymers, nanocomposites, and biopolymers using methods including high-precision, high-accuracy heat capacity measurements, dielectric relaxation, and X-ray scattering. Cebe is also known for her work with deaf and hard-of-hearing students.

== Service and recognition ==
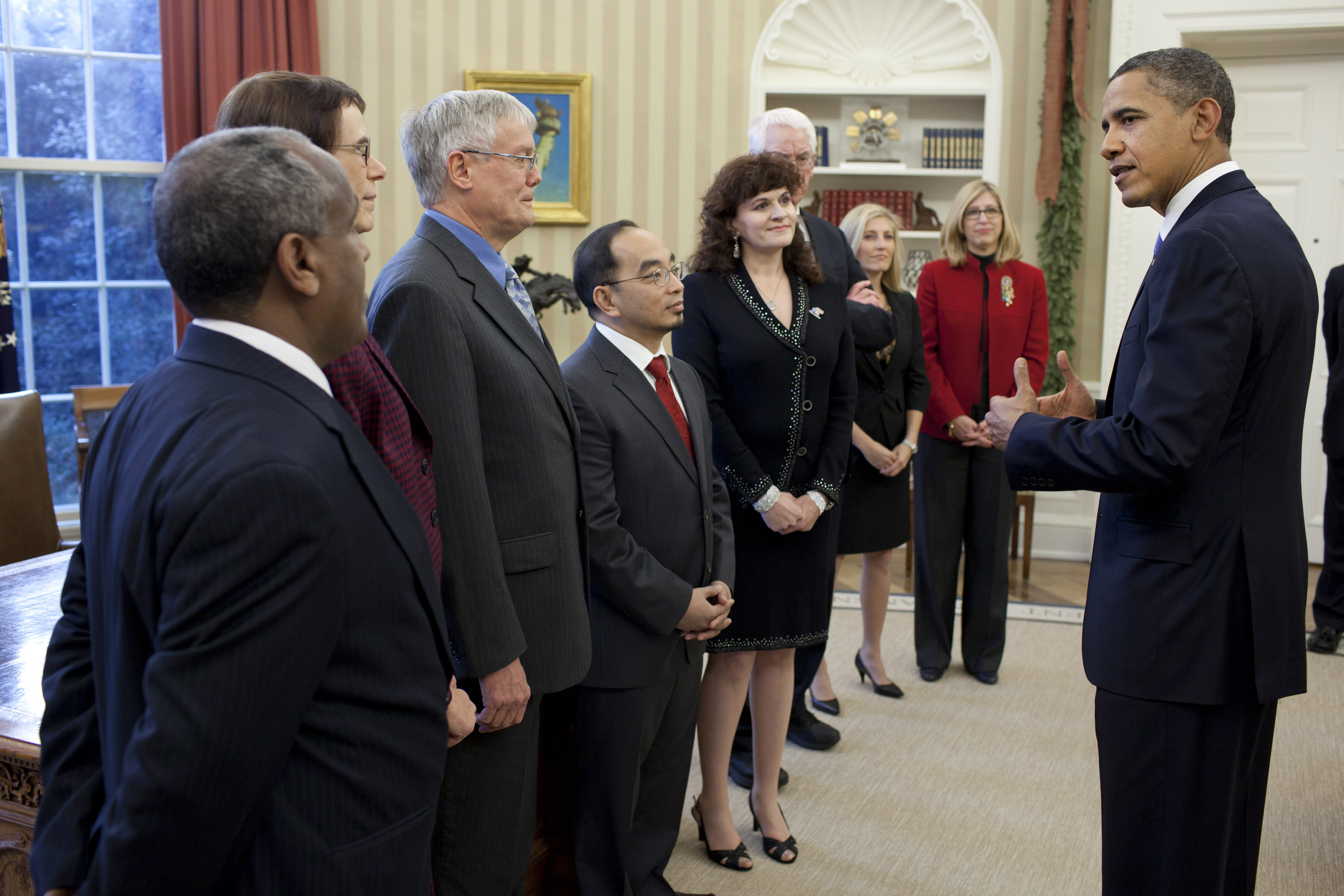
Professor Cebe meeting with President Obama at the awards reception for Excellence in Science, Mathematics, and Engineering Mentoring, 2010

- Presidential Award for Excellence in Science, Mathematics, and Engineering Mentoring (2010), for her program to provide research opportunities for deaf and hard of hearing undergraduates
- Chair, American Physical Society Committee on the Status of Women in Physics (1998)
- Chair, American Chemical Society Division of Polymeric Materials: Science and Engineering (2001)
- Fellow of the American Physical Society (2008)
- Fellow of the North American Thermal Analysis Society (2008)
- Mettler Award for Outstanding Achievement in Thermal Analysis (2013)
- Fellow of the American Chemical Society (2015)
- President of the North American Thermal Analysis Society (2015)
- Tufts University Faculty Research Awards Committee Distinguished Scholar Award (Highest academic award for Tufts faculty) (2016)
- Women Physicist of the Month, American Physical Society (May, 2016)
