= PennWest Clarion =

Public university in Clarion, Pennsylvania, US

Coordinates: 41.209°N 79.378°W

- Former names: Carrier Seminary (1867–1887); Clarion State Normal School (1887–1929); Clarion State College (1929–1982); Clarion University of Pennsylvania (1982–2021)
- Type: Public
- Established: 1867; 159 years ago
- Parent institution: Pennsylvania Western University; PASSHE
- Endowment: $55.25 million (2025)
- President: Jon Anderson
- Provost: James Fisher (interim)
- Faculty: 287
- Students: 1,547 (fall 2025)
- Location: Clarion, Pennsylvania, U.S.
- Campus: Rural, 201 acres (81 ha)
- Colors: Blue & gold
- Nickname: Golden Eagles
- Sporting affiliations: NCAA Division II – PSAC
- Website: pennwest.edu/clarion

Pennsylvania Western University – Clarion (PennWest Clarion, formerly Clarion University of Pennsylvania) is a campus of Pennsylvania Western University in Clarion, Pennsylvania, United States. The institution was founded in 1867 and offers associate, bachelor's, and master's degrees, as well as certificate programs and a Doctor of Nursing Practice. The campus had an enrollment of 1,743 as of fall 2024.

== History ==
PennWest Clarion was founded in 1867 in northwestern Pennsylvania to serve the needs of that rural part of the state. It started as Carrier Seminary, became a normal school in 1887 and a community college in 1920 before becoming a full college in 1929. In the 1960s and 1970s, the college expanded its offerings and size significantly. On July 1, 1982, Clarion joined the newly formed Pennsylvania State System of Higher Education, gained university status and became Clarion University of Pennsylvania.

In 2021, PASSHE announced that, due to budget troubles resulting from declining enrollment and revenue, Clarion University would merge with Edinboro University of Pennsylvania and California University of Pennsylvania. On October 14, 2021, the state officially adopted the new name of the combined universities: Pennsylvania Western University, and began operations with a singular accreditation the following year.

== Academics ==
PennWest Clarion offers 175 degree and certificate programs through its three colleges and two schools, delivered on campus and online. PennWest Clarion has 294 faculty members and 451 administration and staff members.

The university maintains a site in Pittsburgh at West Penn School of Nursing. The university also operates one branch campus formerly "Clarion University Venango Campus" as well as a site at the University of Pittsburgh Pymatuning Laboratory of Ecology. Clarion also offers an extended studies program featuring online courses, remote sites, and various hybrid learning situations.

== Student life ==
In fall 2016, Clarion University's student body totaled 5,225 students, of which 4,330 were undergraduates and 895 of those were graduate students. Of these students, 35 percent live in university housing. The university's students are mostly female (66 percent), another 830 are minorities (16 percent) and 27 are international (.05 percent). Of the total number of students 4,624, or 88.5 percent, come from the commonwealth of Pennsylvania.

PennWest Clarion offers more than 130 student organizations including academic, athletic, Greek, political, multicultural, service, and other special interest groups.

== Athletics ==
The PennWest Clarion Department of Athletics, which maintains the institution's pre-merger athletic branding as "Clarion", currently sponsors men's intercollegiate baseball, basketball, golf, football, swimming and diving, and wrestling along with women's intercollegiate basketball, softball, cross country, golf, soccer, swimming and diving, track and field, volleyball and tennis. All sports compete in the NCAA Division II, except for wrestling which participates in NCAA Division I.

Notable former Golden Eagles include wrestling great Kurt Angle, a former Olympic gold medalist and national champion who went on to a successful professional wrestling career in WWE and Impact Wrestling; former UFC Champion Frankie Edgar, who was a four-time NCAA Division I tournament qualifier; World Long Driver Justin Moose; Reggie Wells, NFL offensive lineman; Cy Young winner Pete Vuckovich; and Hall of Fame basketball coach John Calipari, who was a point guard for the Golden Eagles from 1980 to 1982.

== Notable alumni ==
- Bekzod Abdurakhmonov, wrestler and mixed martial artist
- Kurt Angle, Olympic and professional wrestler
- Michael Armanini, politician
- Brenton Awa, Hawaii politician and former news anchor
- D. Ralph Bouch, football and wrestling coach
- John Calipari, professional and college basketball coach
- Laurie Carter, president of Lawrence University
- Guy Conti, professional baseball physician
- Stan Denski, author
- Adam Earnheardt, academic and author
- Frank Edgar, college wrestler and professional mixed martial artist
- Joan Marie Engel, Rear Admiral in the United States Navy Nurse Corps
- Jeff Hand, football coach
- Alfonso Hoggard, professional football player
- Julian Howsare, professional football player
- Robert Lee James, politician
- Evan John Jones, U.S. Congressman from Pennsylvania
- Suzanne Jenniches, engineer and business leader
- Ben Kribbs, college athletics administrator
- David K. MacEwen, 59th adjutant general of the United States Army
- Rad Martinez, mixed martial artist
- Fred McIlhattan, politician
- Mike Miller, professional football coach
- Ruth Bermudez Montenegro, United States federal judge for the Southern District of California
- Justin Moose, professional golfer
- Donna Oberlander, Pennsylvania state representative
- Larry Richert, radio news host
- Alex Sandusky, professional football player
- Wade Schalles, amateur wrestler
- Tayler Sheriff, baseball coach for the Cincinnati Bearcats
- Randall Silvis, author
- Sean Spencer, professional football player and coach
- Peter Talleri, Major General in the United States Marine Corps
- Robert Thurston, science fiction author
- Pete Vuckovich, professional baseball player
- Reggie Wells, professional football player
- Ian Whyte, actor
- Dan Wilson, biologist and science communicator
