= Thomas James Bernatowicz =

American physicist

Thomas James Bernatowicz, from Washington University in St. Louis, was awarded the status of Fellow in the American Physical Society, having been nominated by their Division of Astrophysics in 1999.

Bernatowicz was educated at Washington University in St. Louis and Edinboro University of Pennsylvania.

Bernatowicz was recognized for his measurements of the double beta decay of 128Te and 130Te, and consequential limits of < 1.5 ev on the Majorana mass of the neutrino. He also has contributed to the discovery and laboratory study of ancient stardust, providing new insights into grain growth in stellar outflows.

== See also ==
- List of fellows of the American Physical Society (1998–2010)
