= Pennsylvania Western University =

Public university in California, Pennsylvania, US

- Other name: PennWest University
- Former names: California University of Pennsylvania; Clarion University of Pennsylvania; Edinboro University of Pennsylvania
- Motto: Three Legacies. Two Centuries. One Mission.
- Type: Public
- Established: 1 July 2022; 4 years ago
- Accreditation: MSCHE
- Academic affiliations: PASSHE
- Endowment: US$130.5 million (2024)
- Budget: US$297.4 million (2025–2026)
- President: Dr. James Fisher (interim)
- Provost: Dr. Kristy Bishop
- Faculty: 569 (Fall 2024)
- Administrative staff: 937 (Fall 2024)
- Students: 10,548 (Fall 2025)
- Undergraduates: 7,331 (Fall 2025)
- Postgraduates: 3,217 (Fall 2025)
- Location: California, Clarion, and Edinboro, Pennsylvania, U.S.
- Campus: California: 294 acres (119 ha) Clarion: 104 acres (42 ha) Edinboro: 585 acres (237 ha); Rural and Suburban
- Colors: PennWest: Blue, deep blue, light blue, gold and red California: Red and black Clarion: Blue and gold Edinboro: Red and gray
- Nicknames: California Vulcans; Clarion Golden Eagles; Edinboro Fighting Scots
- Sporting affiliations: NCAA Division II – PSAC
- Mascots: California: Blaze the Vulcan; Clarion: Ernie the Eagle; Edinboro: MacCato the Fighting Scot
- Website: pennwest.edu
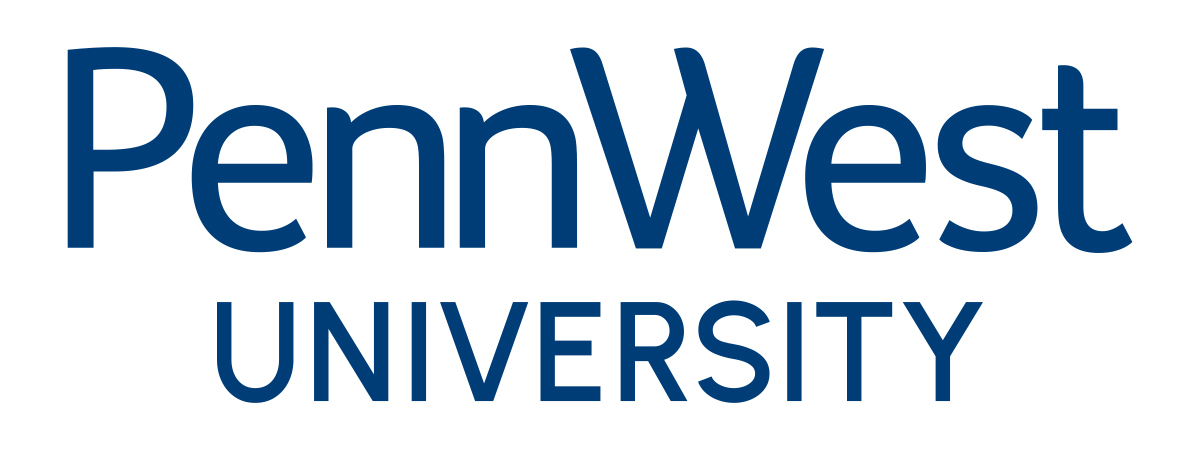

Pennsylvania Western University (PennWest) is a public university in California, Pennsylvania, United States. It is a member of the Pennsylvania State System of Higher Education (PASSHE) and operates three campuses in California, Clarion, and Edinboro. The university also offers undergraduate and graduate programs through its online education division, PennWest Global Online.

The university was established on July 1, 2022, through the consolidation of California University of Pennsylvania, Clarion University of Pennsylvania, and Edinboro University of Pennsylvania. The consolidation was part of PASSHE's system redesign initiative, which aimed to address declining enrollment, financial challenges, and the long-term sustainability of Pennsylvania's state-owned universities.

PennWest operates as a single university while maintaining its three campuses and their respective athletic identities. The university is accredited by the Middle States Commission on Higher Education, which reaffirmed its accreditation on June 26, 2025.

== History ==
=== Pre-PennWest ===
Prior to the formation of Pennsylvania Western University in 2022, its three campuses operated as separate public universities, each with its own history and institutional identity. All three institutions began during the 19th century and originally focused on teacher education.

California University of Pennsylvania was established in 1852 as California Academy in California, Pennsylvania. The institution was later chartered as a normal school to prepare teachers for Pennsylvania's public schools. In 1914, the Commonwealth of Pennsylvania acquired the school and renamed it California State Normal School. It became California State Teachers College in 1928, offering four-year degree programs. As its academic offerings expanded beyond teacher education, the institution was renamed California State College in 1959. Graduate programs were introduced in 1962. In 1983, the institution became part of the newly established Pennsylvania State System of Higher Education (PASSHE) and was renamed California University of Pennsylvania.

Clarion University of Pennsylvania was established on September 10, 1867, as Carrier Seminary of Western Pennsylvania in Clarion, Pennsylvania. The institution began offering teacher training programs in 1871 and became Clarion State Normal School in 1887. The Commonwealth of Pennsylvania acquired the institution in 1915 and assumed full control in 1916. Clarion became a college-level institution in 1920 and continued expanding its academic programs during the 20th century. It became Clarion State College in 1929 and later gained university status as part of PASSHE in 1983, becoming Clarion University of Pennsylvania.

Edinboro University of Pennsylvania was established in 1857 as Edinboro Academy in Edinboro, Pennsylvania, originally serving as a private school for training teachers. In 1861, the institution became the second state normal school in Pennsylvania, known as the Northwestern State Normal School. The Commonwealth purchased the institution in 1914, renaming it Edinboro State Normal School. As its academic programs expanded, the school became Edinboro State Teachers College in 1927 and Edinboro State College in 1960. In 1983, Edinboro gained university status and became Edinboro University of Pennsylvania as part of PASSHE.

=== System redesign ===
In 2016, the Pennsylvania State System of Higher Education (PASSHE), under Chancellor Frank Brogan, began a strategic review of its operations and long-term financial sustainability. The National Center for Higher Education Management Systems (NCHEMS) was commissioned to evaluate the system and recommend changes. Its findings, published in July 2017, identified challenges including declining state financial support, changing demographics, and weaknesses in the system's governance structure.

Following the review, PASSHE began a restructuring initiative known as System Redesign in 2017. The initiative focused on improving student success, coordinating academic and administrative resources among universities, and changing the system's governance and leadership practices. The effort continued under Chancellor Daniel Greenstein, who assumed office in 2018.

In July 2020, Pennsylvania enacted Act 50 of 2020, which amended the legislation governing PASSHE and established a process for integrating universities within the system. The legislation permitted the Board of Governors to consider consolidating eligible institutions while requiring financial reviews, implementation plans, and opportunities for public comment. The legislation did not authorize the closure of the system's existing universities.

In September 2020, PASSHE officials announced that they were considering consolidating six universities into two institutions. The proposed western integration involved California, Clarion, and Edinboro universities, while the northeastern integration involved Bloomsburg, Lock Haven, and Mansfield universities. PASSHE officials presented the proposals as a response to enrollment declines and financial pressures, with the goal of maintaining access to public higher education in the affected regions.

The proposals also raised concerns among faculty representatives and higher education observers. Critics questioned the lack of details about the planned integrations, including their potential effects on academic programs, university employment, and local communities. The Association of Pennsylvania State College and University Faculties (APSCUF), which represents faculty at PASSHE institutions, raised concerns about the uncertainty surrounding the plans.

On October 14, 2020, the PASSHE Board of Governors unanimously supported continuing the planning process for the proposed integrations following an initial financial review. Under the proposed structure, each group of three universities would operate as a single accredited institution with shared leadership and administrative operations while retaining its existing campuses.

=== Western Integration ===
On April 28, 2021, the Pennsylvania State System of Higher Education (PASSHE) Board of Governors approved preliminary implementation plans to consolidate California, Clarion, and Edinboro universities into a single institution, a proposal referred to as the Western Integration. A separate plan proposed combining Bloomsburg, Lock Haven, and Mansfield universities in northeastern Pennsylvania. The preliminary approval began a 60-day public comment period required under Act 50 of 2020 before the Board could make a final decision.

Under the proposed Western Integration, the three universities would operate as one accredited institution with shared leadership, academic administration, and financial operations. The plan called for maintaining the three physical campuses while coordinating academic programs and administrative services. PASSHE officials argued that the changes would reduce administrative costs, expand access to academic programs, and improve the long-term financial sustainability of the institutions.

The proposed consolidation drew criticism and questions from faculty, students, alumni, and community members. Concerns included the possible effects on academic programs, employment, campus identities, and the availability of in-person instruction. Some commenters also questioned whether the proposed integration would resolve the financial difficulties facing the universities. These concerns were documented during the public comment period and in responses submitted to PASSHE.

In June 2021, the Board of Governors held four virtual public hearings concerning the proposed western and northeastern integrations. Two hearings focused on the western proposal on June 9, while two others addressed the northeastern proposal on June 10. Written public comments were also collected and reviewed as part of the approval process.

Following the public comment period, PASSHE revised the proposed integration plans. Updated versions of the western and northeastern implementation plans were released on July 7, 2021. The revisions incorporated changes made following the review of public comments and discussions during Board of Governors workshops.

On July 14, 2021, the PASSHE Board of Governors unanimously approved the final integration plans by an 18–0 vote. The decision authorized California, Clarion, and Edinboro universities to become a single institution in western Pennsylvania, while Bloomsburg, Lock Haven, and Mansfield universities would form a separate institution in northeastern Pennsylvania. The integrations were scheduled to take effect on July 1, 2022, subject to the necessary accreditation approvals.

=== Formation of PennWest ===
On October 14, 2021, the Pennsylvania State System of Higher Education (PASSHE) Board of Governors approved Pennsylvania Western University as the name of the institution formed through the consolidation of California, Clarion, and Edinboro universities. The name was presented by Clarion University president Dale-Elizabeth Pehrsson and approved without opposition. The university adopted PennWest as its abbreviated name.

Following the announcement, students at the three universities were invited to participate in selecting a visual identity for the new institution. Three proposed logo designs were presented for consideration in October 2021. On December 6, 2021, the university announced the selection of a design featuring a compass rose, which became part of PennWest's institutional branding.

On March 10, 2022, the Middle States Commission on Higher Education approved the substantive change request permitting the consolidation. Under the approved arrangement, California University of Pennsylvania was the surviving accredited institution and would change its name to Pennsylvania Western University. Clarion University of Pennsylvania and Edinboro University of Pennsylvania would be integrated into the institution, with their separate accreditations and degree-granting authority ending as part of the consolidation.

The consolidation also required decisions concerning the universities' athletic programs. In 2022, the National Collegiate Athletic Association (NCAA) approved the continuation of separate athletic programs at the three campuses. This arrangement allowed California, Clarion, and Edinboro to retain their respective athletic identities rather than compete as a single university athletic program.

PennWest also established an online education division, PennWest Global Online, to provide undergraduate and graduate programs through distance education. The online division operated alongside the three physical campuses as part of the consolidated university.

On July 1, 2022, Pennsylvania Western University officially began operating as a single public university. The California, Clarion, and Edinboro campuses remained open under their respective campus names, while academic and administrative operations were brought under a unified institutional structure.

=== Development since 2022 ===
Following its establishment on July 1, 2022, Pennsylvania Western University began coordinating academic programs, administrative services, and institutional operations across its California, Clarion, and Edinboro campuses. The university continued to operate three physical campuses alongside PennWest Global Online, its online education division. The integration involved aligning academic curricula, reorganizing administrative operations, and implementing measures intended to address financial challenges inherited from the former institutions.

During its first several years, PennWest experienced declining enrollment. University records show that total enrollment decreased from 12,778 students in fall 2022 to 11,305 in fall 2023 and 10,834 in fall 2024. By fall 2025, enrollment had declined to 10,548 students. During the same period, enrollment in PennWest Global Online increased, although the university changed how it classified online students beginning in fall 2023.

In 2025, PennWest underwent a comprehensive institutional accreditation review by the Middle States Commission on Higher Education. The review included a university self-study and an on-site evaluation in March 2025. On June 26, 2025, the commission reaffirmed the university's accreditation. Its next comprehensive self-study evaluation is scheduled for the 2032–2033 academic year.

In October 2025, PennWest announced a comprehensive review of its academic offerings, including majors, minors, concentrations, and certificate programs. The review examined student outcomes, program enrollment, workforce demand, and financial sustainability. University officials stated that the review would inform changes to academic programs and student support services, with implementation beginning in spring 2026.

In September 2026, PennWest reported a fall enrollment of 10,542 students, a decrease of six students from the previous year. This represented the university's smallest year-over-year enrollment decline since the 2022 consolidation. The university also reported improvements in student retention and growth in online, graduate, and dual-enrollment participation.

== Presidents ==
Since its establishment in 2022, Pennsylvania Western University has been led by four individuals, including two who served in acting or interim capacities. The university president serves as its chief executive officer. The following table numbers these individuals chronologically, including interim appointments.

Presidents of Pennsylvania Western University
No.	President	Took office	Left office	Status	Notes
1	Dale-Elizabeth Pehrsson	July 1, 2022	June 30, 2023	Founding president	First president of Pennsylvania Western University. Previously served as president of Clarion University beginning in 2018, interim president of Edinboro University beginning in 2020, and interim president of California University beginning in 2021. Led the Western Integration Project that established PennWest. In February 2023, she announced her transition to a new PASSHE position as president-in-residence and CEO of PennWest Investment, effective July 1, 2023. Laurie Bernotsky began serving as acting president in March 2023, before Pehrsson's formal term concluded.
2	R. Lorraine "Laurie" Bernotsky	March 1, 2023	June 30, 2024	Acting / Interim president	Began serving as acting president in March 2023 and formally assumed the interim presidency on July 1, 2023. Previously served as executive vice president and provost at West Chester University. Subsequently became the university's 16th president on July 1, 2024.
3	Jon Anderson	July 1, 2024	August 9, 2026	President	Appointed by the PASSHE Board of Governors in May 2024. Previously served as provost and vice president for academic affairs at Southern Utah University. Departed PennWest to become president of Utah Valley University.
4	James "JD" Fisher	August 10, 2026	Incumbent	Interim president	Appointed interim president by the PASSHE Board of Governors in July 2026. Previously served in academic leadership positions at PennWest and within PASSHE, including interim provost and vice president for academic affairs at PennWest and interim vice chancellor and chief academic officer for PASSHE.

== Campuses ==
Pennsylvania Western University operates three physical campuses in western Pennsylvania, located in California, Clarion, and Edinboro. The campuses were formerly separate universities before their consolidation into PennWest in 2022. The university also offers distance education through PennWest Global Online.

=== California ===
PennWest California is located in California, Pennsylvania, in Washington County, along the Monongahela River, south of Pittsburgh. Formerly California University of Pennsylvania, the campus includes academic buildings, residence halls, student dining facilities, recreational spaces, and athletic facilities. Among its facilities is the Natali Student Center, which provides space for student activities and university services.

The campus maintains the Vulcans athletic identity, with red and black as its traditional colors. Its athletic programs compete in NCAA Division II, primarily as members of the Pennsylvania State Athletic Conference (PSAC).

=== Clarion ===
PennWest Clarion is located in Clarion, Pennsylvania, in Clarion County. Formerly Clarion University of Pennsylvania, the campus includes academic buildings, student housing, athletic facilities, and student gathering spaces. Among its facilities are the Gemmell Student Center and Eagle Commons. The campus is located near the Clarion River and Cook Forest State Park.

Clarion maintains the Golden Eagles athletic identity, with blue and gold as its traditional colors. Its athletic programs compete in NCAA Division II, primarily in the PSAC, while its wrestling program competes in NCAA Division I.

=== Edinboro ===
PennWest Edinboro is located in Edinboro, Pennsylvania, in Erie County, south of Erie. Formerly Edinboro University of Pennsylvania, the campus occupies approximately 585 acres and includes academic buildings, student housing, athletic and recreational facilities, wooded areas, and a five-acre lake. The campus also provides facilities for visual and performing arts and services for students with disabilities.

Edinboro maintains the Fighting Scots athletic identity, with red and gray as its traditional colors. The campus has traditions associated with Scottish heritage, including the use of tartan and bagpipes. Its athletic programs compete in NCAA Division II, primarily in the PSAC.

=== PennWest Global Online ===
PennWest Global Online is the university's online education division, offering undergraduate and graduate degree programs through distance learning. Unlike the California, Clarion, and Edinboro campuses, Global Online is not a separate physical campus. Its students are included in Pennsylvania Western University's overall enrollment figures.

=== Campus enrollment ===
According to PennWest's Fall 2025 census, the university enrolled 10,548 students across its three physical campuses and online division. Of these, 7,331 were undergraduate students and 3,217 were graduate students.

Enrollment by campus, Fall 2025
Campus	Location	Undergraduate	Graduate	Total enrollment	Athletic nickname
PennWest California	California	2,380	113	2,493	Vulcans
PennWest Clarion	Clarion	1,489	58	1,547	Golden Eagles
PennWest Edinboro	Edinboro	1,981	79	2,060	Fighting Scots
PennWest Global Online	Online	1,481	2,967	4,448	Not applicable
Total		7,331	3,217	10,548	

Source: Pennsylvania Western University, Fall 2025 census.

Beginning in Fall 2023, PennWest reported students enrolled through Global Online separately from students attending its three physical campuses. Earlier campus enrollment figures may therefore not be directly comparable.

== Student demographics ==
Pennsylvania Western University publishes student enrollment and demographic statistics through its Office of Institutional Research. In Fall 2025, the university enrolled 10,548 students, including 7,331 undergraduate students and 3,217 graduate students. The following tables present university-wide demographic information, including students enrolled through PennWest Global Online.

=== Race and ethnicity ===
The following table presents the racial and ethnic composition of PennWest's student population in Fall 2025, including undergraduate and graduate students.

Student race and ethnicity, Fall 2025
Race or ethnicity	Students	Percentage
White	7,120	67.5%
Black or African American	835	7.9%
Hispanic	500	4.7%
Two or more races	329	3.1%
Asian	119	1.1%
American Indian or Alaska Native	15	0.1%
Native Hawaiian or Other Pacific Islander	9	0.1%
Nonresident alien	145	1.4%
Unknown	1,476	14.0%
Total	10,548	100%

Source: Pennsylvania Western University, Fall 2025 census. Percentages are rounded to one decimal place and may not total exactly 100%.

=== Gender distribution ===
In Fall 2025, female students represented approximately 66% of PennWest's total enrollment, while male students represented approximately 34%. The categories reflect those published in the university's institutional research report.

Student enrollment by gender, Fall 2025
Gender	Students	Percentage
Female	6,963	66.0%
Male	3,585	34.0%
Total	10,548	100%

Source: Pennsylvania Western University, Fall 2025 census.

=== Economic diversity ===
One measure of economic diversity is the percentage of undergraduate students receiving federal Pell Grants, which are generally awarded to students with financial need. In Fall 2023, approximately 40.8% of PennWest's full-time undergraduate students received Pell Grants. This measure does not include part-time undergraduate students or graduate students.

Pell Grant recipient status, Fall 2023
Category	Percentage
Received a Pell Grant	40.8%
Did not receive a Pell Grant	59.2%
Total	100%

Source: Pennsylvania Western University, Fall 2023. Figures represent full-time undergraduate students. Students who did not receive Pell Grants are not necessarily from higher-income households.

== Academics ==
Pennsylvania Western University offers undergraduate and graduate education through its California, Clarion, and Edinboro campuses and PennWest Global Online. As of fall 2025, the university was organized into three academic colleges and 14 academic departments, offering more than 90 degree programs.

=== Academic organization ===
PennWest's academic programs are administered through three colleges: the College of Education, Arts and Humanities; the College of Health Sciences and Human Services; and the Eberly College of Science, Technology and Business. The university also maintains three professional schools: the School of Education, School of Nursing, and School of Business.

Academic colleges, schools and departments
College	Professional school	Academic departments
College of Education, Arts and Humanities	School of Education	Criminal Justice, History and Politics; Education; English, Philosophy and Modern Languages; Library and Information Science; Visual and Performing Arts
College of Health Sciences and Human Services	School of Nursing	Communication Sciences and Disorders; Exercise, Health and Sport Sciences; Nursing and Health Professions; Psychology, Counseling and Art Therapy; Social Work, Sociology and Human Services
Eberly College of Science, Technology and Business	School of Business	Biology, Earth and Environmental Sciences; Business, Economics and Communication; Chemistry, Mathematics and Physics; Computing and Engineering Technology

Source: Pennsylvania Western University, academic colleges and departments.

=== Degree programs ===
PennWest offers associate, bachelor's, master's and professional doctoral degrees, along with undergraduate and graduate certificates. Its academic offerings include programs in education, business, health professions, computer science, social sciences, humanities, natural sciences and the arts. Students may also pursue minors and other academic credentials, with program availability varying by campus and instructional format.

=== Online education ===
PennWest Global Online provides undergraduate and graduate education through distance learning. The division offers selected degree and certificate programs, with online students enrolled as part of Pennsylvania Western University rather than a separate institution. The university is approved by the Middle States Commission on Higher Education to offer programs through distance education.

=== Accreditation ===
Pennsylvania Western University is institutionally accredited by the Middle States Commission on Higher Education (MSCHE). The commission reaffirmed the university's accreditation on June 26, 2025, following a self-study and an on-site evaluation in March 2025. Its next comprehensive self-study evaluation is scheduled for the 2032–2033 academic year.

As part of the 2025 reaffirmation, MSCHE requested additional evidence of long-term financial planning, including enrollment projections and assumptions supporting financial sustainability. On September 4, 2026, the commission acknowledged receipt of the requested supplemental information report.

Certain academic programs also hold specialized accreditation. PennWest's School of Education is accredited by the Council for the Accreditation of Educator Preparation (CAEP). In July 2025, the university announced that its Bachelor of Science in Early Childhood and Elementary Education and its graduate Reading Specialist program had received accreditation from the International Dyslexia Association.

== Athletics ==
Pennsylvania Western University maintains three separate intercollegiate athletic programs representing its California, Clarion, and Edinboro campuses. Each program retains the nickname, colors, and athletic traditions of its predecessor university. Although the three institutions consolidated into PennWest on July 1, 2022, their athletic programs continued to operate separately. On April 20, 2022, the National Collegiate Athletic Association (NCAA) affirmed that California, Clarion, and Edinboro could retain separate athletic programs following the consolidation.

All three campuses compete primarily in NCAA Division II as members of the Pennsylvania State Athletic Conference (PSAC). The men's wrestling programs at Clarion and Edinboro compete in NCAA Division I as members of the Mid-American Conference (MAC). The three campuses remain separately listed as NCAA member institutions.

According to PennWest, its athletic programs collectively include 45 NCAA Division II teams and two Division I wrestling programs, involving more than 1,200 student-athletes.

=== Athletic programs ===
The three campuses maintain separate athletic departments, team identities, and branding. PennWest publishes individual athletic branding guides for the California Vulcans, Clarion Golden Eagles, and Edinboro Fighting Scots.

Intercollegiate athletics by campus
Campus	Athletic identity	Athletic colors	NCAA classification	Conference
PennWest California	Vulcans	Red and black	Division II	PSAC
PennWest Clarion	Golden Eagles	Blue and gold	Division II; Division I men's wrestling	PSAC; MAC (men's wrestling)
PennWest Edinboro	Fighting Scots	Red and gray	Division II; Division I men's wrestling	PSAC; MAC (men's wrestling)

Sources: NCAA membership directory and PennWest's athletic branding guides.

=== California Vulcans ===
The California Vulcans represent PennWest's California campus in California, Pennsylvania. The athletic program competes in NCAA Division II as a member of the PSAC. Its teams retain the Vulcans nickname and the traditional red and black athletic colors of the former California University of Pennsylvania.

California sponsors intercollegiate sports including football, men's and women's basketball, baseball, softball, men's and women's soccer, volleyball, cross country, track and field, golf, tennis, and swimming and diving. The Vulcans have maintained separate teams and athletic administration since the creation of PennWest in 2022.

The football program plays its home games at Adamson Stadium, while basketball and volleyball are among the sports using the Convocation Center. The campus's athletic facilities also support training, recreation, and other intercollegiate competitions.

California has competed in the PSAC since before the university consolidation. Its athletic history includes conference championships and NCAA postseason appearances, including achievements in football, basketball, and volleyball.

During the 2025–2026 academic year, California introduced women's flag football as an additional varsity sport. The program was among three new women's sports offerings introduced across PennWest during that period.

=== Clarion Golden Eagles ===
The Clarion Golden Eagles represent PennWest's Clarion campus in Clarion, Pennsylvania. Most varsity teams compete in NCAA Division II as members of the PSAC, while the men's wrestling program competes in NCAA Division I as a member of the MAC. The teams retain the Golden Eagles nickname and the traditional blue and gold colors of the former Clarion University of Pennsylvania.

Clarion sponsors intercollegiate sports including football, men's and women's basketball, baseball, softball, men's and women's golf, women's soccer, volleyball, cross country, track and field, tennis, and swimming and diving. Men's wrestling is the campus's Division I athletic program.

The Golden Eagles football team plays its home games at Memorial Stadium, while basketball and volleyball competitions are held at Tippin Gymnasium. The campus also maintains facilities for swimming, diving, wrestling, and other athletic activities.

Clarion has a history of competition in both NCAA divisions. Its wrestling program has produced nationally recognized competitors, while the swimming and diving program has achieved success at the NCAA Division II level. The university has reported national championships in women's swimming and diving as part of Clarion's athletic history.

Clarion's men's wrestling program remains affiliated with the MAC for Division I competition, while the campus's other NCAA varsity programs participate primarily in the PSAC.

=== Edinboro Fighting Scots ===
The Edinboro Fighting Scots represent PennWest's Edinboro campus in Edinboro, Pennsylvania. Most varsity teams compete in NCAA Division II as members of the PSAC, while the men's wrestling program competes in NCAA Division I as a member of the MAC. The teams retain the Fighting Scots nickname and the traditional red and gray colors of the former Edinboro University of Pennsylvania.

Edinboro sponsors intercollegiate sports including football, men's and women's basketball, cross country, swimming and diving, tennis, track and field, softball, women's soccer, women's volleyball, women's lacrosse, women's golf, and wrestling. Men's wrestling competes at the Division I level, while women's wrestling competes at the Division II level.

The Fighting Scots football team plays its home games at Sox Harrison Stadium. The campus's McComb Fieldhouse serves as a venue for basketball, wrestling, and other athletic activities. Edinboro also maintains facilities supporting swimming, tennis, track and field, and other sports.

The Fighting Scots have a history of NCAA postseason competition, including national success in men's cross country. Edinboro also has a wheelchair basketball program, which is distinct from its NCAA varsity programs.

On April 11, 2025, Edinboro announced the establishment of women's wrestling and women's golf programs, with competition scheduled to begin during the 2025–2026 academic year. Both programs were introduced at the NCAA Division II level.

=== Athletic developments since consolidation ===
Following the 2022 consolidation, the three campuses continued competing separately in intercollegiate athletics rather than forming a single university-wide athletic program. The NCAA's approval allowed each campus to maintain its existing teams, athletic identity, and competition structure.

PennWest subsequently expanded its women's athletic offerings. During the 2025–2026 academic year, California introduced women's flag football, while Edinboro added women's golf and women's wrestling.

The university also reported improvements to athletic facilities during the 2024–2025 fiscal year. These included artificial turf replacement projects at Memorial Stadium on the Clarion campus and Sox Harrison Stadium on the Edinboro campus. The Memorial Stadium project also involved replacing the drainage system beneath the playing surface.

Despite operating as a consolidated university, PennWest continues to maintain separate athletic branding guidelines for the Vulcans, Golden Eagles, and Fighting Scots.

== Student life ==
Student life at Pennsylvania Western University is organized across its California, Clarion, and Edinboro campuses. Although the three institutions consolidated into one university in 2022, each campus retains student organizations, student government, campus media, activities, and traditions associated with its predecessor institution. Students participate in academic and professional organizations, recreational clubs, community service, performing arts, fraternities and sororities, and campus events. The university also provides residence halls, student centers, dining facilities, and recreational services at its three residential campuses.

Student activities are supported by campus-based organizations and university student affairs offices. The three campuses maintain distinct programming organizations and facilities, while sharing university-wide administrative and student support services. PennWest's institutional self-study identifies separate campus programming boards, student government structures, and fraternity and sorority communities.

=== Student organizations ===
PennWest supports student organizations representing academic interests, professional development, cultural and religious activities, recreation, community service, and student leadership. These organizations allow students to participate in activities outside their academic programs, organize campus events, and represent shared interests. Student organizations are associated with their respective campuses, although the university provides a common online student involvement system for locating organizations and activities.

At California, the university reports more than 100 student clubs and organizations. The campus's organizations include academic and professional associations, recreational clubs, cultural groups, performing arts organizations, and service organizations. Student Association, Inc. (SAI), a student-owned nonprofit corporation, has historically provided support for student activities, organizations, and media operations at California.

Clarion reports more than 140 student clubs and organizations on its campus information pages, although some university pages describe more than 150. These include academic associations, student leadership groups, Greek-letter organizations, recreational clubs, and community service organizations. The campus's University Activities Board (UAB) organizes student entertainment and events. The Eagle Ambassadors organization involves students in university tours, admissions events, alumni engagement, and other campus functions.

Edinboro reports more than 140 student clubs and organizations. These include academic associations, cultural groups, recreational organizations, student media, performing arts groups, and service organizations. The campus uses the Engage student involvement platform to provide information about registered organizations. Its Highland Ambassadors program involves students in campus tours, university events, and outreach to prospective students and other members of the community.

Student organizations also participate in campus fundraising, leadership development, and service activities. At Edinboro, the university holds an annual Club and Organization Awards program recognizing student leadership, service, and organizational activities. The March 2026 awards included recognition of student organizations involved in broadcasting, nursing, the performing arts, and other campus activities.

=== Student government ===
PennWest maintains separate student government organizations associated with its California, Clarion, and Edinboro campuses. These organizations represent student interests, provide opportunities for elected leadership, and participate in campus decision-making. The university's institutional self-study documents the continued operation of campus-based student governance following the 2022 consolidation.

At California, the Student Government Association (SGA) represents students through a campus governance structure that has included a Student Senate and House of Representatives. Student representatives participate in discussions involving campus concerns, student activities, and the operation of student organizations. Student Association, Inc. is a separate nonprofit organization involved in administering student activity resources and supporting student services.

At Clarion, the Student Senate serves as the campus's student representative organization. Student leaders participate in campus governance and communicate student concerns. The Clarion Students' Association, a nonprofit corporation owned and operated by Clarion students, provides services through the stewardship of student activity fees and other resources. Its offices are located in the Gemmell Student Complex. The Student Senate and Clarion Students' Association have distinct roles in student representation and the administration of student activities.

At Edinboro, the Student Government Association represents the campus's student body. The organization includes student senators and executive leadership and works with student organizations on matters involving campus activities, organizational development, and student concerns. The SGA also provides opportunities for students to participate in leadership and university governance. Its office is located in the Frank G. Pogue Student Center.

The separate student government organizations reflect the continued operation of campus-specific student communities within PennWest. University-wide student affairs services operate alongside these campus representative bodies.

=== Fraternities and sororities ===
Fraternities and sororities are part of student life at PennWest's residential campuses. Greek-letter organizations provide opportunities for social activities, leadership development, academic involvement, philanthropy, and community service. Fraternity and sorority organizations are associated with their individual campuses, with membership and recognized chapters varying over time.

California maintains fraternity and sorority organizations through its student involvement system. These include social fraternities and sororities as well as Greek-letter organizations associated with academic and service interests. Campus organizations participate in student activities and charitable events.

At Clarion, PennWest's student organization information lists four fraternities and five sororities. The campus maintains a Greek Life Office in the Gemmell Student Complex. Fraternity and sorority activities include recruitment, leadership programs, social events, and charitable fundraising. Greek-letter organizations also participate in campus traditions and Homecoming activities.

At Edinboro, the university similarly lists four fraternities and five sororities. The organizations participate in social, academic, and philanthropic activities. PennWest has reported fundraising by the Edinboro Greek community for the Leukemia and Lymphoma Society, including a dodgeball fundraiser that raised more than $4,000.

PennWest's institutional self-study documents the role of Greek-letter organizations in campus life and their participation in student activities. The number of recognized organizations and their membership may change between academic years.

=== Student media ===
PennWest's California, Clarion, and Edinboro campuses have separate student media traditions originating at the three predecessor universities. These have included student newspapers, radio stations, television production organizations, and digital media. Student participation provides experience in journalism, broadcasting, photography, audio and video production, editing, and communications.

The three campuses have maintained different arrangements for their student media organizations. Some outlets operate as student organizations or through student associations, while others have been connected with academic programs and faculty advising. The current operating status of individual publications and broadcasting organizations varies by campus.

==== California ====
The California campus's principal student media outlets are The Cal Times, WCAL-FM, and California University Television (CUTV). These organizations developed at the former California University of Pennsylvania and have provided students with experience in print and digital journalism, radio broadcasting, and television production. Their operations have historically been associated with the campus's student media facilities and Student Association, Inc.

The Cal Times is the student newspaper associated with California. The publication covers campus news, university activities, athletics, student issues, and events affecting the surrounding community. Students involved in the newspaper gain experience in reporting, writing, editing, photography, and digital publication. The newspaper has continued to be associated with campus media activities following the establishment of PennWest.

WCAL-FM broadcasts at 91.9 FM and is known as Power 92. The station has provided music, news, sports, and other programming for the California campus and surrounding area. Its activities provide students with opportunities to participate in on-air presentation, music programming, audio production, and station operations. WCAL has historically operated through the campus's student media structure.

California University Television (CUTV) is the campus's student television production organization. Established in 1986, CUTV has produced news, athletic coverage, and other programming involving the university and surrounding community. Students participate in reporting, camera operation, editing, directing, and studio and field production. CUTV has also provided coverage of California Vulcans athletic events.

PennWest has continued to identify all three organizations as opportunities for student involvement. In July 2026, the university published a profile of a California student who participated in The Cal Times, CUTV, and WCAL while pursuing professional experience in sports media.

==== Clarion ====
Student media at Clarion developed through the former Clarion University of Pennsylvania and its communications programs. Historically, the campus's media organizations included The Clarion Call newspaper and the WCUC and WCCB broadcasting organizations. These outlets provided opportunities for students to participate in journalism, radio, television, and electronic media production.

The Clarion Call was the student newspaper of Clarion University of Pennsylvania. The publication covered university news, student government, campus activities, athletics, and community events. Students participated in reporting, editing, photography, and other newspaper activities. Archived editions document its role as a source of campus information before PennWest's formation in 2022. Its current publication status has not been established by recent available sources.

WCUC is Clarion's campus radio broadcasting organization, historically associated with WCUC-FM at 91.7 FM. Its programming and production activities have provided experience in music broadcasting, radio presentation, news, and audio production. The organization has been associated with broadcasting facilities in Becker Hall, a long-standing location for Clarion's student media activities.

WCCB is another of Clarion's student broadcasting organizations, associated with the campus's radio and video production history. WCCB and WCUC have used facilities in Becker Hall, where students have participated in broadcasting and related media activities. The two organizations have maintained an alumni community connected with Clarion's broadcasting programs.

In September 2025, PennWest announced that Clarion's Homecoming celebration would include events recognizing the history of WCUC and WCCB. The activities included a tour of Becker Hall and a reunion banquet in the broadcasting studio. The university also described current students and faculty as continuing the campus's broadcasting tradition. These events documented the continuing role of the organizations and their facilities in Clarion's campus community.

==== Edinboro ====
The Edinboro campus's principal student media outlets are The Spectator, WFSE-FM, and Edinboro Television (ETV). The organizations developed at the former Edinboro University of Pennsylvania and have provided opportunities for students interested in journalism, radio, television, and digital media. Campus media activities have been associated with Compton Hall and the Edinboro Now student media website.

The Spectator is Edinboro's student newspaper. Established in 1935, the publication has covered campus news, student government, athletics, the arts, and events affecting the university and surrounding community. Its activities have included print and online publication, with student participation in reporting, editing, photography, and news production. The newspaper's online content has been published through Edinboro Now.

WFSE-FM, broadcasting at 88.9 FM and branded as Fighting Scots Radio, is Edinboro's student-run radio station. The station broadcasts music and student-produced programming and provides experience in on-air presentation, audio production, programming, and station management. WFSE has also participated in campus activities and community engagement projects.

In April 2025, PennWest reported that WFSE had received a top-five finalist recognition for Best Community Outreach Event at an Intercollegiate Broadcasting System conference. The recognition followed the station's special programming for the April 2024 solar eclipse, which included interviews and educational information. In March 2026, WFSE received the Fighting Scots Award at Edinboro's Club and Organization Awards. The university recognized the station for its student-led programming, campus engagement, and training of new broadcasters.

Edinboro Television (ETV) is a student television production organization. Its history is associated with the Edinboro News Network, established in 1991. ETV has produced campus news, sports coverage, public affairs programming, and coverage of university events, including commencement activities. Students have participated in reporting, camera operation, editing, directing, and studio production.

The three organizations have provided Edinboro students with opportunities to develop communication and production skills outside the classroom. Their activities continue the campus's student media traditions established before the 2022 university consolidation.

=== Residence life and housing ===
Pennsylvania Western University provides on-campus housing at its California, Clarion, and Edinboro campuses through the Office of Residence Life and Housing. The university operates residence halls, suite-style accommodations, and apartment-style housing, with residential facilities and services varying by campus. Residence Life and Housing is responsible for housing assignments, residential policies, community development, and student support within university housing.

PennWest maintains separate Residence Life and Housing offices at each campus. The California office is located in Building B, the Clarion office is in Becht Hall, and the Edinboro office is in the Frank G. Pogue Student Center. Housing applications, roommate matching, and room selection are administered through the university's housing and dining portal.

==== Residency requirements ====
PennWest maintains a four-semester residency requirement for eligible incoming undergraduate students. Under university policy SA017, first-time undergraduate students and transfer students with 48 earned credits or fewer are generally required to live in university housing for four consecutive semesters unless they qualify for an exemption. Students commuting from the home of a parent or guardian within an approved distance of their campus may be exempt from the requirement.

The approved commuting distances are 50 miles for California, 30 miles for Clarion, and 50 miles for Edinboro. Students seeking an exemption must submit a request through the university's housing portal. The university also provides procedures for housing accommodations, contract releases, and other circumstances affecting residential eligibility.

Housing assignments are coordinated through an application and room selection process. Students may participate in roommate matching and select from available housing options according to eligibility, room availability, and university procedures. Students seeking housing accommodations related to a disability are directed to the Office for Students with Disabilities at their respective campus.

==== Community Assistants and residential programming ====
PennWest employs student Community Assistants (CAs) to support students living in university residence halls and apartments. Community Assistants serve as representatives of Residence Life and Housing and are responsible for helping develop residential communities, maintaining communication with residents, and connecting students with university services. Their responsibilities include assisting residents with academic and personal concerns, supporting positive roommate relationships, and promoting awareness of university policies and community standards.

Community Assistants organize educational and social programs intended to encourage student participation and interaction within residential communities. According to the university's published Community Assistant position description, programming responsibilities include planning, conducting, and evaluating residence hall events, preparing bulletin boards and door decorations, promoting campus activities, and participating in building-wide programs. Community Assistants are also responsible for communicating information about university resources and events to residents.

Residential programming is intended to support community development and provide opportunities for students to connect with one another outside the classroom. Programs may address educational topics, student engagement, social interaction, and campus involvement. Community Assistants are expected to consider the interests and needs of residents when planning activities and to encourage participation in university-sponsored events.

In addition to programming, Community Assistants conduct floor meetings, maintain regular contact with residents, assist with roommate agreements, and refer students to appropriate university offices when additional assistance is needed. They also participate in residence hall operations, including scheduled duty coverage, safety rounds, and the documentation of residential concerns. These responsibilities are carried out under the supervision of professional Residence Life and Housing staff.

PennWest's institutional impact report documented 1,784 programs facilitated by Community Assistants during the university's reporting period. The report identified residential programming and student participation in campus activities as components of the university's student engagement efforts.

==== Living-learning communities and themed housing ====
PennWest offers living-learning communities (LLCs) and themed housing arrangements at its residential campuses. Living-learning communities bring together students with shared academic interests, while themed housing provides residential environments organized around common preferences or interests. Participation is coordinated through the university's housing application and room selection process.

The university's published housing options include Honors communities at California, Clarion, and Edinboro; an Education community at California; a Health and Human Services community at Clarion; and Art, Nursing, and STEM communities at Edinboro. These arrangements are intended to connect students with similar academic interests and provide opportunities for interaction outside the classroom.

Themed housing options include multicultural communities, gender identity housing, and quiet living communities. Quiet living areas are intended to provide an environment supportive of studying and reduced noise. Students interested in these arrangements indicate their preferences during the housing application process, with placement dependent on eligibility and available space.

==== California ====
The California campus provides on-campus accommodations through five residence halls and the Vulcan Village apartment complex. The residence halls offer climate-controlled rooms, private bathrooms, shared lounges, and recreational common areas. Housing arrangements include semi-suites and suites with different occupancy configurations. Some residence hall areas are designated for students with shared interests through the university's residential community programs.

Vulcan Village provides apartment-style housing primarily intended for upper-level undergraduate students. The complex includes two-bedroom and four-bedroom apartment arrangements with private bedrooms, bathrooms, kitchens, and laundry facilities. Shared amenities include study lounges, fitness facilities, and recreational spaces. The community also offers academic and social activities for residents.

Vulcan Village maintains an additional Community Assistant structure described in its community handbook. Operational Community Assistants assist with property operations, including office services, lockouts, and community events. Residence Life Community Assistants are responsible for educational and community-based programming and assisting residents with interpersonal concerns. The two groups operate under different supervisory arrangements.

PennWest reports that approximately 77 percent of first-year students at California live in on-campus housing. The campus's Residence Life and Housing Office coordinates residential services and housing assignments, while Vulcan Village maintains separate procedures for some aspects of apartment selection and roommate matching.

==== Clarion ====
The Clarion campus provides university housing through Suites on Main and Reinhard Villages. Suites on Main offers suite-style accommodations near the campus and downtown Clarion. The residential complex includes semi-suites and suites with different bedroom and bathroom configurations, providing students with access to university facilities and the surrounding community.

Reinhard Villages provides apartment-style housing intended primarily for sophomores, juniors, and seniors. The complex offers two-person and four-person apartments with private bedrooms, kitchens, laundry facilities, and furnished common areas. Its location provides access to campus while maintaining a residential arrangement separate from the main residence hall complex.

Clarion's residential facilities are connected with campus services and student activities, including the Gemmell Student Center, Eagle Commons, and recreational facilities. The campus's Residence Life and Housing Office is located in Becht Hall and coordinates housing assignments, student support, and residential operations.

In September 2026, PennWest announced the opening of a new student activity and service area at Suites on Main South. The space included dining options, student organization areas, university services, the campus bookstore, and gathering areas for students. The development was intended to connect residential life with student services and the surrounding downtown community.

==== Edinboro ====
The Edinboro campus provides residential accommodations through the Highlands residence hall complex. The Highlands includes single- and double-occupancy studios, suites, and semi-suites. The residential buildings provide study lounges, kitchen facilities, laundry areas, and shared spaces. The complex is located near academic buildings, dining services, recreational facilities, and other campus resources.

The university's campus directory identifies eight Highlands residence hall buildings. The residential complex provides different room arrangements and common areas intended to support studying, student interaction, and residential activities.

Edinboro's Residence Life and Housing Office is located in the Frank G. Pogue Student Center. The office coordinates housing applications, room assignments, residential policies, and other housing services. Community Assistants and professional residence life staff support residents through community programming, communication, and assistance with residential concerns.

PennWest reports that approximately 77 percent of first-year students at Edinboro live in on-campus housing. The university also offers several living-learning and themed housing options at Edinboro, including Art, Nursing, STEM, Honors, and quiet living communities.

=== Campus activities and recreation ===
PennWest maintains student centers, recreational facilities, and campus programming organizations at its three residential campuses. Student activities include concerts, speakers, student organization programs, recreational sports, cultural events, and other campus gatherings. The university's institutional self-study identifies the Student Activities Board at California, University Activities Board at Clarion, and University Programming Board at Edinboro as campus-based programming organizations.

==== California ====
The Elmo Natali Student Center is a principal location for student activities and services at California. It provides space for student organizations, meetings, dining, and other campus functions. Student Association, Inc. and campus programming organizations have supported student activities and events at California.

The campus also provides opportunities for fitness, recreation, and attendance at intercollegiate athletic events. Recreational activities complement the university's varsity athletics program and provide students with opportunities to participate in campus activities outside academic coursework.

==== Clarion ====
The Gemmell Student Complex is a principal center of student activities at Clarion. It houses student services and organizations, including the Clarion Students' Association and offices supporting Greek life, leadership, and student development. The complex provides spaces for meetings, dining, informal gatherings, and other activities.

Clarion's University Activities Board organizes entertainment and other student programming. Its activities have included concerts, speakers, and campus events. The university also provides recreational opportunities through facilities such as racquetball courts and other fitness and sports spaces.

Clarion's location in northwestern Pennsylvania provides access to outdoor recreation near the Clarion River and Cook Forest State Park. The surrounding area offers opportunities for hiking, canoeing, kayaking, and other recreational activities. The campus also maintains connections with the surrounding borough of Clarion through community and university events.

==== Edinboro ====
The Frank G. Pogue Student Center serves as a principal location for student activities and services at Edinboro. The building contains meeting rooms, lounges, dining facilities, recreational spaces, and offices supporting student organizations and university services. It houses the Student Government Association, University Programming Board, Campus Life Office, and Residence Life and Housing Office.

The University Programming Board (UPB) organizes student entertainment and activities, including concerts, do-it-yourself programs, bingo events, and other campus programming. The Campus Life Office supports student organizations and participates in university events such as New Student Orientation, Welcome Weekend, and Homecoming.

The Pogue Student Center also contains recreational facilities, including a fitness center, gymnasiums, an elevated running track, aerobic and dance studios, racquetball courts, and a climbing gym. The campus's recreation facilities are supported through student fees, with access governed by university policies.

Edinboro also offers visual and performing arts activities, athletic events, and programs organized by student clubs and academic departments. The campus maintains an events calendar covering university programs, recreational activities, and other events involving students and the surrounding community.

=== Campus traditions ===
California, Clarion, and Edinboro maintain traditions originating at their predecessor universities. These traditions are reflected in campus celebrations, athletic events, Homecoming activities, and student organization programs. Each campus retains its separate athletic identity: the California Vulcans, Clarion Golden Eagles, and Edinboro Fighting Scots.

Homecoming celebrations bring together students, alumni, faculty, and community members. Activities vary by campus and have included athletic competitions, alumni gatherings, student organization events, and other university-sponsored programs.

At Clarion, Homecoming is associated with Golden Eagles athletics and the surrounding community's Autumn Leaf Festival. The 2025 celebration included a pep rally, football game, alumni reunions, and events recognizing the history of WCUC and WCCB. The university also organized activities involving student organizations and alumni groups.

At Edinboro, Scottish-themed traditions are associated with the Fighting Scots identity. These include the use of tartan, bagpipes, and the university's Scottish-inspired athletic imagery. The campus also maintains traditions associated with its visual and performing arts programs and student organizations.

The preservation of these traditions reflects the continued role of California, Clarion, and Edinboro as distinct campus communities within Pennsylvania Western University.
