= Tayler Sheriff =

American college baseball coach

Current position
- Title: Director of Pitching Development
- Team: Cincinnati
- Conference: Big Twelve Conference

Biographical details
- Born: 30–31

Coaching career (HC unless noted)
- 2015–2016: United HS (P)
- 2017: Penn State New Kensington (P)
- 2018: IUP (P)
- 2019–2021: Spalding (P/RC)
- 2022: Western Illinois (P)
- 2023: Western Illinois
- 2024–present: Cincinnati (P)

Head coaching record
- Overall: 12–40 (.231)

Tayler C. Sheriff is an American baseball coach, who is the current Pitching Coach for the Cincinnati Bearcats.

== Coaching career ==
On July 11, 2022, Sheriff was promoted to interim head baseball coach of the Western Illinois Leathernecks.

== Head coaching record ==
Record table
Season	Team	Overall	Conference	Standing	Postseason
Western Illinois Leathernecks (Summit League) (2023–present)
2023	Western Illinois	12–40	8–16	T-5th	
Western Illinois:		12–40	8–16		
Total:		12–40			
National champion Postseason invitational champion Conference regular season champion Conference regular season and conference tournament champion Division regular season champion Division regular season and conference tournament champion Conference tournament champion
