= Ben Kribbs =

American college athletics administrator (1918–1968)

Biographical details
- Born: November 17, 1918; Knox, Pennsylvania, U.S.
- Died: January 12, 1968 (aged 49); Lewisburg, Pennsylvania, U.S.

Playing career

Football
- 1935: Clarion
- 1937–1938: Clarion
- Position: End

Coaching career (HC unless noted)

Football
- 1947–1949: Waynesboro HS (PA)
- 1950–1951: Clarion

Basketball
- 1950–1952: Clarion
- 1952–1962: Bucknell

Administrative career (AD unless noted)
- 1962–1968: Bucknell

Head coaching record
- Overall: 6–7–1 (college football); 131–127 (college basketball); 8–20—3 (high school football)

Benton Albert Kribbs (November 17, 1918 – January 12, 1968) was an American college athletics administrator. He attended Clarion State College (now, Clarion University of Pennsylvania) and served as the head coach of that school's football, basketball, and baseball teams from 1949 to 1952. He was hired as the head basketball coach at Bucknell University in 1952 and held that job for 10 years until 1962 when he became Bucknell's athletic director. He held that job until his death in 1968.
