= Rajee Narinesingh =

American actress and television personality

- Born: April 7, 1967 (age 59); Brooklyn, New York City, New York, U.S.
- Education: Edinboro University of Pennsylvania
- Occupations: Actress, reality television star, singer, activist, author
- Years active: 1985–present

Rajee Narinesingh (born April 7, 1967) is an American actress, LGBT activist, author, singer, and reality television personality, most widely known for her appearances on the E! Entertainment docu-series, Botched, which documented her struggles to remove cement from her face, breasts and hips after previous mismanaged fillers by a fake doctor. Most of the concrete-like substance was removed from her face after her second appearance on the show.

== Early life and education ==
Narinesingh was born in Brooklyn, New York, to Boyie "Roop" Narinesingh (died December 2004) and Sandra Narinesingh and was raised in Philadelphia, Pennsylvania. Narinesingh has one younger sister. She is of Trinidadian Dougla origin. Her father was Indo-Trinidadian and her mother has French, Afro-Trinidadian, and Polynesian roots. Narinesingh graduated from Franklin Learning Center, a performing arts high school in Philadelphia, later graduating from Edinboro University of Pennsylvania. She worked at a Korean-owned jewelry store for close to ten years before relocating to Miami, Florida to work for The American Red Cross.

== Personal life and rise to fame ==
Narinesingh came out as a transgender woman in the late 1990s, and began transitioning. In 2005, as an effort to feminize her appearance, she went to Oneal Ron Morris seeking filler injections in her face, breasts and hips. Morris, also known as “The Duchess”, is also a transgender woman, and was known in the local Miami trans community for providing cheap alternatives to expensive, professional plastic surgery. Although Narinesingh, at the time, believed her to have some medical training, Morris was not a licensed doctor. The fillers, which Narinesingh believed to be silicone, turned out to be a mixture of concrete, tire sealant, mineral oil and glue. Narinesingh was unaware of this for several months following the injections, until her body began to react negatively to the substances and her skin began to swell. The fillers hardened under Narinesingh's skin, causing nodules to form where the chemicals were injected. Too embarrassed to seek help, she spent the next few years hardly leaving her home. Finally, at the urging of a friend, she went to see plastic surgeon Dr. John J. Martin. Martin agreed to treat her for free, and began conducting ultrasound treatment and started Narinesingh on a course of anti-inflammatory medication, which lasted several years. In 2015 Narinesingh was finally ready to have most of the concrete removed from her face, and underwent four surgeries over seven weeks, a process which was documented in season 3 of the E! reality show Botched. She has also appeared on numerous talk shows such as Anderson Cooper 360, Dr. Phil, and The Doctors.

Narinesingh also has a career as an actress and musician, appearing in several movies, such as the 2010 film Bella Maddo, directed by Janice Danielle, and has released several singles, including her 2016 release "Shake My Cement Tits".

== Filmography ==
=== Film ===
| Year | Title | Role | Notes |
|---|---|---|---|
| 199? | South Beach High | Transsexual Prostitute | Film debut, film no longer in circulation |
| 2010 | Bella Maddo | Aunt Norma | Main role, short film |
| 2015 | What is Perfect? | Herself | Short documentary |
| 2019 | Prophecy | Lady of Fortune | Short film, Credited other places as Fortune Teller |
| 2020 | Sylvia | Neighbor | Short film |
| 2020 | Bliss of Rai | Tonya | Short film |
| TBA | Body Electric | Herself | Documentary |
| TBA | Beyond Judgment | Herself | Documentary |

=== Television ===
| Year | Title | Role | Notes |
|---|---|---|---|
| 1985–1987 | Dance Party USA | Herself/Featured Dancer | Unknown episodes |
| 2011 | Dr. Phil | Herself | 1 episode |
| 2011 | Anderson Cooper 360° | Herself | 1 episode |
| 2012 | Howard Stern On Demand | Herself | 1 episode |
| 2013 | Taboo USA | Herself | 1 episode |
| 2013 | Botched Up Bodies | Herself | |
| 2013–2014 | The Trisha Goddard Show | Herself | 3 episodes |
| 2015 | This Morning | Herself | 1 episode |
| 2015–2018 | Botched | Herself | 4 episodes |
| 2015–2016 | I Am Jazz | Herself | 2 episodes |
| 2017 | Crime & Justice With Ashleigh Banfield | Herself | 1 episode |
| 2018 | Hooked on the Look | Herself | |
| TBA | Seconds in a Heartbeat | Cashier | 1 episode, television acting debut |

== Singles ==
- "Stumble" (1997)
- "Stumble" (re-release) (2013)
- "Shake My Cement Tits" (2016)
- "Rajee's Working it Out" (2016)

== Bibliography ==
- Windows to My Soul
- The Hand I Was Dealt (2003)
- Writings of a Demi God (2007)
- Beyond Face Value A Journey to True Beauty (2012)
