= Eugene Eubanks =

African American educator

Eugene Emerson Eubanks (June 6, 1938 – November 20, 2011) was an American professor and school administrator focused on school desegregation. He was a longtime professor at the University of Missouri–Kansas City's School of Education, eventually becoming the school's first African American dean. Following a U.S. Federal Courts case, Eubanks was appointed to oversee the Kansas City Public Schools desegregation efforts in 1984. He went on to serve as a consultant in numerous school desegregation cases, and as president of the American Association of Colleges for Teacher Education.

== Early life and education ==
Eugene Eubanks was born in Meadville, Pennsylvania on June 6, 1938 to Nelson and Emily Jackson Eubanks. He attended Meadville High School, where he played basketball. After high school, he joined the U.S. Air Force serving as a math teacher and Russian voice analyst. Upon leaving the Air Force, Eubanks returned to formal education, receiving a bachelor's degree in 1963 from Edinboro State Teachers College. He then taught mathematics and served as principal in Cleveland Public Schools while pursuing a master's degree in secondary school administration from John Carroll University. Eubanks then went on to earn a second master's degree and a doctoral degree in education from Michigan State University. He completed his doctorate in 1972, with a thesis titled Teachers' job satisfaction and dissatisfaction in defacto segregated high schools.

== Academic career ==
Eubanks joined the faculty of the University of Delaware as an assistant professor. In 1974, he moved to the University of Missouri, Kansas City as assistant dean of the School of Education. In 1980, he became dean of the School of Education, the first African American in the position. In 1983, the Kansas City, Missouri, School District selected Eubanks to lead a review of its secondary schools. The review highlighted the school's poor performance, including low literacy and test scores, and high dropout rates. In 1984, based in part on Eubanks' report, a US federal district court ruled the Kansas City, Missouri, School District to be unconstitutionally segregated; the court appointed a committee to monitor the district's desegregation, appointing Eubanks as chair. In 1994, another court case People Who Care v. Rockford Board of Education, School District #205 ended with the court appointing Eubanks to oversee school desegregation efforts in Rockford, Illinois.

Eubanks served as president of the American Association of Colleges and Teachers in Education and editor of the Journal of the National Alliance of Black School Educators.

== Later life ==
Upon his retirement in 2003, Eubanks was granted the titles professor emeritus and dean emeritus from the University. Despite his university retirement, he continued to teach high school math. Eubanks died on November 20, 2011, and is buried at Meadville's Greendale Cemetery.
