= Barber National Institute =

- Founded: 1952
- Founder: Dr. Gertrude A. Barber
- Type: 501(c)(3) charitable organization
- Location(s): Erie, Pennsylvania; United States
- Region served: Worldwide
- Key people: John Barber (President and CEO)
- Employees: Over 3000
- Website: barberinstitute.org

Barber National Institute (formerly the Barber Center) is a nonprofit, multi-faceted organization that provides services to more than 5,400 children, adults, and families with autism, intellectual disabilities, and behavioral health challenges. Barber National Institute is guided by compassion, innovation, and an unshakeable belief in human potential. We work every day to help make dreams come true for people of all abilities.

== History ==
Dr. Gertrude A. Barber, Founder of the Barber National Institute

Barber National Institute was founded in 1952 by the late Dr. Gertrude A. Barber. An educator and administrator in the Erie City School District in Erie, Pennsylvania, Dr. Barber, along with a small group of local teachers and parents, opened a one-classroom school in the local YWCA for children with developmental disabilities.

As programs expanded, the City of Erie leased its former communicable disease hospital to the Barber Center in 1958. The first permanent location for the programs, this site formed what has become the main campus in Erie.

Construction began in 1968 for new administrative offices, a medical suite, cafeteria, and classrooms for middle and high school aged students. In 1969, a facility was opened in Corry, Pennsylvania to provide services for individuals in southern Erie County. The Barber Center's first group homes were opened in 1973, after the downsizing of an institution in Venango County, PA. A satellite center was also opened in Girard, PA to accommodate those living in the western portion of Erie County. The Barber Center expanded to other areas of the state by opening group homes and support services in Philadelphia in 1990 and a day support program and residential group homes in the Pittsburgh area in 1999.

== Current ==
In 2003, the Barber Center name was changed to what is now Barber National Institute. It currently serves more than 5,400 children and adults annually in locations across Pennsylvania. The 11th largest employer in Erie County, Barber National Institute has approximately 3,000 employees. Barber National Institute provides services in a variety of fields including autism, behavioral health diagnosis, and intellectual disabilities.

== Accreditations and memberships ==
- In 2023, was named as a Pennsylvania “School of Excellence” by the National Association of Special Education Teachers
- Approved Private School, Pennsylvania Department of Education
- Member of the Pennsylvania Early Learning Keys To Quality (Keystone Stars Program)

== Services and programs ==
=== Infants and children ===
- An autism center for the diagnosis and treatment of Autism
- An approved private school, the Elizabeth Lee Black School serves children ages 3 – 21 with multiple intellectual and physical disabilities from 24 area school districts.
- Early intervention for infants and toddlers in their homes or child care centers that include physical, occupational, speech, and behavioral therapies
- Happy Hearts Child Care and Preschool, featuring “inclusive” classrooms for typically developing children and students with disabilities
- A Mental Health Partial Hospitalization Program, which integrates mental health services into a child's educational program
- Summer camps offer children and teens with intellectual disabilities and autism a safe and engaging opportunity to learn, grow, and have fun. Whether it's swimming, arts and crafts, bicycle riding, games, or enjoying time outdoors, each activity is designed to encourage independence while ensuring the support and care each person needs to thrive.

=== Adults ===
- Employment services including Supported Employment, offering training and placement for adults with disabilities in jobs in the community
- Adult Day Services – Assists in vocational, recreational, and social skills
- ESO (Expanding Social Opportunities) – Recreational program in conjunction with typical peers at area colleges
- Adult autism service that provides diagnosis, treatment, and medication management
- Creative Connections is an artist-in-residence initiative designed to bring professional artists into day programs, school, and community spaces.

=== Residential services ===
- Community homes provide a safe, nurturing, family-like structured environment to meet the needs of adults with intellectual disabilities, autism, and behavioral health needs in Erie County, Pennsylvania, Philadelphia area and Pittsburgh
- Life Sharing through Family Living, a program administered through the PA Department of Public Welfare which enables an adult with a disability to reside with a family provider.
- Agency with Choice, a program that allows individuals and their families to self-direct their own services.

=== Community services ===
- Community pool offering swim lessons and water fitness programs, for all abilities in a state-of-the-art, therapeutic setting. A movable floor rises to the level of the deck and lowers to 4/5 feet. No patron has difficulty entering and exiting the water and will not be in water deeper than them. Waterproof chairs are also available for wheelchair-bound patrons to help them enter the water with ease and use our shower facilities.
- Time for Me Children's program is designed for children with an intellectual disability or autism ages 5 through 15. Attendees enjoy structured activities including crafts and gym time.
- Sib Sessions is a comfortable setting for children and teens to share and learn about the ups and downs of being a brother or a sister to a sibling with a disability.
- Kids on the Block is a troupe of very likable puppets, with and without disabilities, designed to teach children about differences and similarities in people.
- Special Needs Parent Support Group is a welcoming space for parents and caregivers of children with autism to connect, share experiences, ask questions, and find support from others who understand.

== Location and facilities ==
Facilities are located in Bedford, Corry, Erie, Girard, Pittsburgh, Philadelphia, Somerset, and Warren, Pa.

=== Locations ===
Erie, PA, Main Campus Barber National Institute Main Campus; 100 Barber Place; Erie, PA 16507	Philadelphia, PA Barber National Institute; Two Falls Center Suite 900; 3300 Henry Avenue; Philadelphia, PA 19129	Pittsburgh, PA Barber National Institute; 20 Emerson Lane Suite 905; Bridgeville, PA 15017	Warren, PA Barber National Institute Bollinger Campus; 44 N State St. North Warren, PA 16365
Corry, PA Barber National Institute Adult Day Services; 670 Sciota Road; Corry, PA 16407	Girard, PA Barber National Institute Adult Day Services; 1126 Lake Street; Girard, PA 16417	Bedford, PA Barber National Institute Adult Day Services; 181 Friendship Village Road Bedford, PA 15522	Somerset, PA Barber National Institute Adult Day Services; 1219 Red Brant Road Somerset, PA 15501
