= Tom Herman (American football coach, Gannon) =

American football coach

Current position
- Title: Chief of staff & tight ends coach
- Team: Mercyhurst
- Conference: NEC

Playing career
- c. 1970: Edinboro
- Positions: Offensive lineman, defensive lineman

Coaching career (HC unless noted)
- 1972–1973: Cambridge Springs HS (PA) (assistant)
- 1974: Marshall (GA)
- 1975: Edinboro (DL)
- 1976–1978: Edinboro (OL)
- 1979–1984: Edinboro (AHC/DC)
- 1985 (spring): Edinboro (interim HC)
- 1985–1988: New Hampshire (LB/RC)
- 1989–1998: Gannon
- 1999–2016: Mercyhurst (OL)
- 2017–present: Mercyhurst (TE)

Administrative career (AD unless noted)
- ?–present: Mercyhurst (chief of staff)

Head coaching record
- Overall: 43–51–2

Tom Herman is an American college football coach. He is the chief of staff and tight ends coach at Mercyhurst University, positions he has held since 2017. He was the head football coach at Gannon University from 1989 to 1998, where he compiled a record of 43–51–2.

== Head coaching record ==
Year	Team	Overall	Conference	Standing	Bowl/playoffs
Gannon Golden Knights (NCAA Division II independent) (1989–1998)
1989	Gannon	0–7			
1990	Gannon	6–3			
1991	Gannon	3–7			
1992	Gannon	6–3–1			
1993	Gannon	6–4			
1994	Gannon	6–3–1			
1995	Gannon	7–3			
1996	Gannon	2–8			
1997	Gannon	4–6			
1998	Gannon	3–7			
Gannon:		43–51–2			
Total:		43–51–2			
