= PennWest Edinboro =

Public university in Edinboro, Pennsylvania, US

Pennsylvania Western University – Edinboro
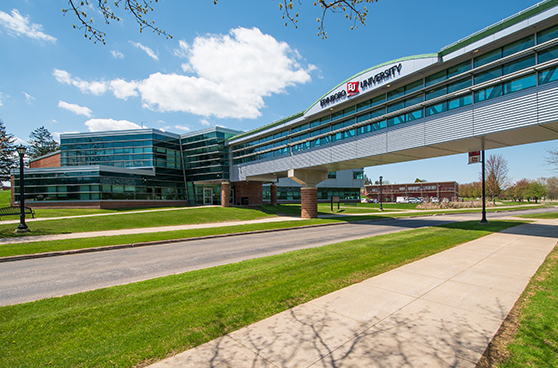
- Ross Hall building and attached pedestrian walkway
- Former name: List: Edinboro Academy (1857–1861); Northwest State Normal School (1861–1914); Edinboro State Normal School (1914–1927); Edinboro State Teachers College (1927–1960); Edinboro State College (1960–1983); Edinboro University of Pennsylvania (1983–2021); PennWest Edinboro (2021–present)
- Type: Public campus
- Established: 1857; 169 years ago
- Parent institution: Pennsylvania Western University
- Academic affiliations: PASSHE
- Endowment: $44.2 million (2025)
- President: Jon Anderson
- Provost: James Fisher (interim)
- Faculty: 346
- Administrative staff: 392
- Students: 2,060 (fall 2025)
- Location: Edinboro, Pennsylvania, U.S. 41°52′12″N 80°07′19″W
- Campus: 585 acres (237 ha)
- Fight song: Scotland the Brave
- Colors: Red & white
- Nickname: Fighting Scots
- Sporting affiliations: NCAA Division I – MAC (Wrestling only); NCAA Division II – PSAC
- Mascots: MacCato, the Fighting Scot
- Website: pennwest.edu/edinboro

Pennsylvania Western University – Edinboro (often shortened to PennWest Edinboro) is a campus of Pennsylvania Western University in Edinboro, Pennsylvania. The campus had an enrollment of 2,259 as of fall 2024.

== History ==
PennWest Edinboro was founded in 1857 as Edinboro Academy, a private training school for Pennsylvania teachers, by the region's original Scottish settlers. It is the oldest training institution west of the Allegheny Mountains and the second-oldest in Pennsylvania.

Edinboro Academy initially consisted of a modest two-story building that featured six classrooms. The school began with three instructors, 110 students, and one principal. The original building, known as Academy Hall, is currently used as the undergraduate admissions office.

In 1861, Edinboro Academy affiliated with the state government of Pennsylvania to become the second State Normal School in Pennsylvania, also known as Northwest State Normal School.

In 1914, the state purchased the school from the original stockholders and renamed it Edinboro State Normal School.

By 1927, the advancement of academic programs to include liberal arts study required the school to rename itself Edinboro State Teachers College. Further development of the liberal arts to include degree programs outside the field of education resulted in another renaming, the school becoming Edinboro State College in 1960. Continued development of undergraduate liberal arts programs and advanced graduate degrees earned the school university status in 1983, at which point it was renamed Edinboro University of Pennsylvania. It held the name for 38 years.

In July 2021, the university merged with two other western Pennsylvania institutions, Clarion University of Pennsylvania and California University of Pennsylvania. On October 14, 2021, the state officially adopted the new name of the combined universities: Pennsylvania Western University.

== Campus ==
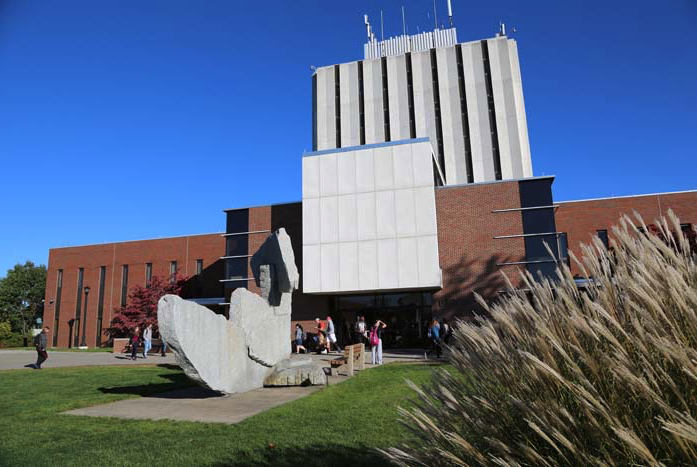
Baron-Forness Library

The campus is located 18 miles (29 km) from Erie, Pennsylvania and within 5 miles (8.0 km) of the educational and population centers of McKean, Waterford, and Albion. The main campus has 18 buildings on a 585-acre (2.37 km^{2}) campus which includes a 5-acre (20,000 m^{2}) lake, open fields and woods, 8 on-campus residence halls, and the seven-story Baron-Forness Library. PennWest Edinboro offers 150 degree programs and 57 minors. The student-faculty ratio is 18:1.

In 2007, the university announced a plan to build dormitories for $115 million. The new dormitories, called the Highland Complex, featured eight halls, with the first four opening to students in 2008 and 2009, and the last four following suit in 2010 and 2011. They opened at a time when enrollment was at a peak. By 2022, enrollment had sharply declined, and the school was in the process of merging with two other universities. That year, PennWest Edinboro announced that buildings 7 and 8 of the Highland Complex were to be sold; at the time the two buildings housed no students.

== Athletics ==
PennWest Edinboro offers 17 varsity sports: women's basketball, cross country, lacrosse, volleyball, swimming, soccer, softball, tennis, and indoor and outdoor track and field; and men's football, wrestling, cross country, basketball, swimming, tennis, wheelchair basketball, and outdoor track and field. All but the wrestling and wheelchair basketball are NCAA Division II programs, and members of the Pennsylvania State Athletic Conference. Wrestling competes on the NCAA Division I level. The wheelchair basketball team competes in the NWBA Intercollegiate Division. The football stadium on campus is called Sox Harrison Stadium.

== Notable alumni ==
Alumni and attendees of PennWest Edinboro include politicians such as L. C. Hughes (governor of Arizona Territory), Milton W. Shreve (member of the U.S. House of Representatives), and several members of the Pennsylvania House of Representatives; academics such as Robert Carothers (president of University of Rhode Island) and Eugene Eubanks (professor at University of Missouri–Kansas City and leader of school desegregation efforts); artists and entertainers such as photographer LaToya Ruby Frazier, Train lead singer Pat Monahan, and actress Sharon Stone; Vicki Van Meter who at age 11 was the youngest aviator to fly across the continental United States; and Dave Filoni, who is the president and CCO of Lucasfilm.
