= Jack Lund Schofield =

American politician (1923–2015)

Jack Schofield

Member of the Nevada Assembly
- In office November 1970 – November 1974

Member of the Nevada Senate from the 3rd (Clark County) district
- In office November 1974 – November 1978

Personal details
- Born: April 25, 1923 Douglas, Arizona, United States
- Died: March 13, 2015 (aged 91)
- Party: Democratic
- Spouse: Alene Earl
- Education: University of Utah, University of Nevada

Jack Lund Schofield (April 25, 1923 – March 13, 2015) was an American politician, educator, and businessman. A fighter pilot in World War II and the Korea War, after teaching and going into business, he was in the Nevada Assembly from 1971 to 1975, and in the Nevada State Senate from 1975 to 1979.

== Biography ==
Jack Lund Schofield was born April 25, 1923 in Douglas, Arizona.

Schofield graduated from Las Vegas High School in 1941. He then served in the United States Army Air Forces during World War II and was a pilot with the 22nd Bomb Squadron. Schofield also served in the Korea War, with the Flying Tigers in China.

He was an alumnus of the University of Utah and University of Nevada, Reno, and University of Nevada, Las Vegas.

Schofield was a general contractor and builder, developer, and educator in Las Vegas, Nevada. He was president of Jack Schofield Development Corporation, and owner of Kitchen Craft cookware. He was a factory distributor for the West Bend Company. He was also a member of the Nevada State Education Association, and the National Education Association.

He had a middle school named after him in 2001, for his 40 years of service in the Clark County School District (CCSD).

From 1969 to 1976, he taughter summer sessions as a visiting professor in aerospace at the University of Nevada in Las Vegas.

Schofield then served in the Nevada Assembly from 1971 to 1975 and was a Democrat and later served in the Nevada State Senate from 1975 to 1979.

== Personal life ==
As of 1977, he was married to Alene Earl. They had several children, including four daughters and two sons. A practicing Mormon, he died in 2015. He was a member of the VFW, the American Legion, Phi Delta Kappa, Sertoma, and Hump Pilots' Association.
