= List of Phi Kappa Psi grand chapters =

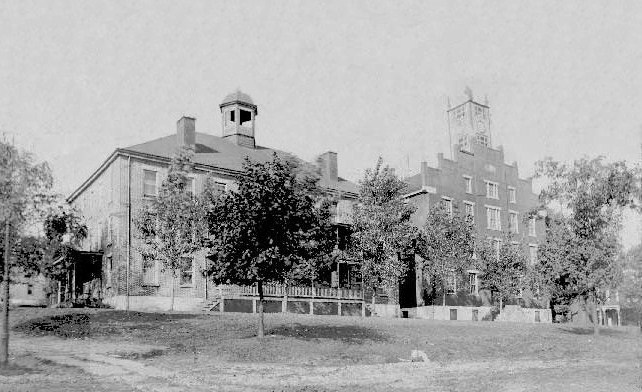
Jefferson College, where Phi Kappa Psi was founded, and home to the first Grand Chapter

Phi Kappa Psi, also called "Phi Psi," is an American collegiate social fraternity founded at Jefferson College in Canonsburg, Pennsylvania on February 19, 1852. There are over a hundred chapters and colonies at accredited four year colleges and universities throughout the United States.

Phi Kappa Psi's first form of government centered on a Grand Chapter. One chapter at a time was designated the Grand Chapter, and it was responsible for governing the national fraternity. This lasted until 1886 when a new constitution changed to the current form of government.

In 1992, Phi Kappa Psi began to award one exceptional chapter with the Grand Chapter Award. Its name is derived from the fraternity's first form of government. This award was initially granted biennially at Grand Arch Councils. 2001 marked the first time that this award was granted in an odd-numbered year, and it has been an annual award ever since.

== Grand Chapters ==
Years	Chapter	Host Institution	Ref.
1852–1856	Pennsylvania Alpha	Jefferson College	
1856–1861	Virginia Alpha	University of Virginia	
1861–1866	Pennsylvania Delta	Washington College	
1866–1869	Virginia Delta	Bethany College	
1869–1875	Pennsylvania Zeta	Dickinson College	
1875–1878	Ohio Alpha	Ohio Wesleyan University	
1878–1881	Pennsylvania Theta	Lafayette College	
1881–1884	District of Columbia Alpha	Columbian College	
1884–1886	Pennsylvania Epsilon	Gettysburg College	

== Grand Chapter Award winners ==
Year	Chapter	Host Institution	Ref.
1992	Ohio Lambda	Miami University	
1994	Ohio Lambda	Miami University	
1996	Indiana Zeta	Butler University	
1998	Ohio Lambda	Miami University	
2000	Ohio Theta	Ashland University	
2001	California Beta	Stanford University	
2002	Iowa Alpha	University of Iowa	
2003	Indiana Epsilon	Valparaiso University	
2004	Kansas Alpha	University of Kansas	
2005	California Beta	Stanford University	
2006	New York Theta	Rochester Institute of Technology	
2007	California Beta	Stanford University	
2008	Iowa Alpha	University of Iowa	
2009	Ohio Mu	University of Dayton	
2010	California Beta	Stanford University	
2011	Ohio Mu	University of Dayton	
2012	New Jersey Epsilon	Rowan University	
2013	New York Theta	Rochester Institute of Technology	
2014	Indiana Delta	Purdue University	
2015	Oregon Beta	Oregon State University	
2016	Iowa Alpha	University of Iowa	
2017	Pennsylvania Theta	Lafayette College	
2018	Kansas Alpha	University of Kansas	
2019	Iowa Beta	Iowa State University	
2020	New York Theta	Rochester Institute of Technology	
2021	Minnesota Beta	University of Minnesota	
2022	Iowa Beta	Iowa State University	
2023	Iowa Beta	Iowa State University	
2024	Minnesota Beta	University of Minnesota	
2025	Iowa Beta	Iowa State University	
