= List of Alpha Tau Omega chapters =

Alpha Tau Omega is an American social fraternity. It was established at the Virginia Military Institute in 1865 and absorbed Alpha Gamma fraternity in 1882. In the following list, active chapters are indicated in bold and inactive chapters and institutions are in italics.

Chapter	Former name	Charter date and range	Institution	Location	Status	Ref.
Alpha	Virginia Alpha	September 11, 1865 – 1881		Lexington, Virginia	Inactive	(Note: Chapter closed due to anti-fraternity laws.)
Beta	Virginia Beta	November 18, 1865 – 1887; 1890–1899; 1906–1949	Washington and Lee University	Lexington, Virginia	Inactive	(Note: Chapter revived in 1906 by Chi Rho, established in 1906.)
Gamma	Tennessee Gamma	March 4, 1874 – 1876		Columbia, Tennessee	Inactive	(Note: This was a community-based chapter.)
**Delta**	Virginia Delta	November 25, 1868 – 1985; 1996	University of Virginia	Charlottesville, Virginia	Active	(Note: Chapter reformed in 1996 from Chi Delta Sigma, established in 1993.)
Epsilon	Virginia Epsilon	November 10, 1869 – 1876; 1881–1892	Roanoke College	Salem, Virginia	Inactive	
Zeta	West Virginia Zeta	April 1, 1866 – 1867		Weston, West Virginia	Inactive	
Eta	Virginia Gamma	July 7, 1866 – 1876		Harrisonburg, Virginia	Inactive	
Theta	Tennessee Theta	July 22, 1866 – 1867		Knoxville, Tennessee	Inactive	
Iota	Tennessee Iota	November 15, 1867 – 1873	Union University	Murfreesboro, Tennessee	Inactive	(Note: The chapter went inactive when the university closed. Later, Southern Baptist University in Jackson, Tennessee was renamed Union University in honor of a donor who was associated with the defunct college.)
Kappa	Tennessee Kappa	February 5, 1867 – 1872		Memphis, Tennessee	Inactive	
Lambda	Tennessee Lambda	November 17, 1868 – 1872; 1899–1902	Cumberland University	Lebanon, Tennessee	Inactive	
Mu	Kentucky Mu	March 10, 1870 – 1872; 1881 – 1887	Kentucky Military Institute	Lyndon, Kentucky	Inactive	(Note: Chapter closed when the institute closed.)
Nu	Tennessee Nu	November 2, 1871 – 1872	University of Nashville	Nashville, Tennessee	Inactive	(Note: Chapter closed when the university closed.)
**Xi**	North Carolina Xi	March 30, 1872 – 1879; 1890	Duke University	Trinity, North Carolina	Active	(Note: Chapter was established at Trinity College, now Duke University)
Omicron	Kentucky Omicron	May 16, 1872 – 1873	Bethel College	Russellville, Kentucky	Inactive	
Pi	Tennessee Pi	October 18, 1872 – 1873; 1901–November 2021	University of Tennessee	Knoxville, Tennessee	Inactive	(Note: Chapter formed at East Tennessee University, now the University of Tennessee. In 2021, the university and national fraternity suspended the chapter for five years, following repeated alcohol and hazing violations.)
Rho	Virginia Rho	December 12, 1872 – 1875	Bethel Academy	Warrenton, Virginia	Inactive	(Note: Charter was withdrawn.)
Sigma	Georgia Sigma	January 3, 1874 – 1875		Rome, Georgia	Inactive	
Tau (First)	Virginia Tau	1874–1876	Randolph–Macon College	Ashland, Virginia	Inactive	
Upsilon	District of Columbia Upsilon	November 6, 1874 – 1875; 1887–1888	George Washington University	Washington, D.C.	Inactive	(Note: Chapter formed at Columbian University, now George Washington University.)
Phi	Virginia Phi	December 15, 1875 – 1876		Alexandria, Virginia	Inactive	
Chi	Illinois Chi	July 21, 1875 – 1876		Chicago, Illinois	Inactive	
Psi	Maryland Psi	1877–1878; 1924–199x ?	Johns Hopkins University	Baltimore, Maryland	Inactive	(Note: Chapter reformed in 1924 from Silver Arrow, established in 1921.)
Omega	Tennessee Omega	August 1, 1877 – 2021	University of the South	Sewanee, Tennessee	Inactive	
Alpha Alpha	Virginia Alpha Alpha	September 15, 1878 – 1882	University of Richmond	Richmond, Virginia	Inactive	
**Alpha Beta**	Georgia Alpha Beta	November 14, 1878 – 2000; 2004	University of Georgia	Athens, Georgia	Active	
Alpha Gamma	Kentucky Alpha Gamma	1884–1890	Central University of Kentucky	Richmond, Kentucky	Inactive	
**Alpha Delta**	North Carolina Alpha Delta	May 23, 1879	University of North Carolina	Chapel Hill, North Carolina	Active	
**Alpha Epsilon**	Alabama Alpha Epsilon	December 18, 1879 – 2001; 2006	Auburn University	Auburn, Alabama	Active	(Note: Chapter formed at Alabama Polytechnic Institute, now Auburn University.)
**Alpha Zeta**	Georgia Alpha Zeta	November 27, 1880	Mercer University	Macon, Georgia	Active	
Alpha Eta	North Carolina Alpha Eta	April 7, 1881 – 1889	Bingham Military School	Mebane, North Carolina	Inactive	
**Tau (Second)**	Pennsylvania Tau	April 8, 1881 – 1884; 1891–1896; 1901	University of Pennsylvania	Philadelphia, Pennsylvania	Active	
**Alpha Theta**	Georgia Alpha Theta	April 26, 1881	Emory University	Atlanta, Georgia	Active	
**Alpha Iota**	Pennsylvania Alpha Iota	October 14, 1881 – 2000; April 30, 2011	Muhlenberg College	Allentown, Pennsylvania	Active	
Alpha Kappa	New Jersey Alpha Kappa	October 15, 1881 – 1884; 1890–1896	Stevens Institute of Technology	Hoboken, New Jersey	Inactive	
Alpha Lambda	New York Alpha Lambda	November 25, 1881 – 1884; 1891–1892; 1900–1910	Columbia College	New York City, New York	Inactive	
**Alpha Mu**	Michigan Alpha Mu	November 21, 1881 – 1971; 1974–1979; 1991	Adrian College	Adrian, Michigan	Active	(Note: Chapter formed from Magnum Concilium, established in 1881.)
**Alpha Nu**	Ohio Alpha Nu	February 14, 1882	University of Mount Union	Alliance, Ohio	Active	
Alpha Xi	Arkansas Alpha Xi	March 28, 1882 – 1883; 1951–1964	University of Arkansas	Fayetteville, Arkansas	Inactive	
**Alpha Omicron**	New York Alpha Omicron	February 18, 1882 – 2010; 2012	St. Lawrence University	Canton, New York	Active	
**Alpha Pi**	Pennsylvania Alpha Pi	March 12, 1882 – 1893; 1901	Washington & Jefferson College	Washington, Pennsylvania	Active	(Note: Formed from a chapter of Alpha Gamma.)
Alpha Rho	Pennsylvania Alpha Rho	February 20, 1882 – 1886; 1890–1897; 1903–2022	Lehigh University	Bethlehem, Pennsylvania	Inactive	(Note: Chapter was reestablished in 1903 by absorbing a chapter of Psi Alpha Kappa, established in 1901.)
**Alpha Sigma**	Oregon Alpha Sigma	October 11, 1882 – 1883; 1916	Oregon State University	Corvallis, Oregon	Active	(Note: Chapter was reestablished in 1916 from the Ahneek Club (local), established in 1910.)
**Alpha Tau**	Tennessee Alpha Tau	April 10, 1881	Rhodes College	Memphis, Tennessee	Active	(Note: Chapter formed from Alpha Gamma, established in 1878 at Southwestern Presbyterian University, now Rhodes College.)
**Alpha Upsilon**	Pennsylvania Alpha Upsilon	June 27, 1882	Gettysburg College	Gettysburg, Pennsylvania	Active	(Note: Chapter formed at Pennsylvania College, now Gettysburg College.)
**Alpha Phi**	South Carolina Alpha Phi	November 25, 1883 – 1897; 1927–2012; 2015	University of South Carolina	Columbia, South Carolina	Active	(Note: Chapter closed in 1897 because of anti-fraternity laws. It was re-established in 1927 by absorbing the Bohemian Club (local), established in 1922.)
Alpha Chi	South Carolina Alpha Chi	January 1, 1883 – 1886; 1888–1891	The Citadel	Charleston, South Carolina	Inactive	
**Alpha Psi**	Ohio Alpha Psi	November 8, 1883 – 1997	Wittenberg University	Springfield, Ohio	Inactive	
**Alpha Omega**	Florida Alpha Omega	February 26, 1884 – 1890; 1904	University of Florida	Gainesville, Florida	Active	
**Beta Alpha**	Iowa Beta Alpha	March 16, 1885 – 1890; 1905	Simpson College	Indianola, Iowa	Active	(Note: Chapter formed from Rho Alpha, established in 1882. After going inactive, it reformed from Rho Iota Phi, established in 1902.)
Beta Beta	Alabama Beta Beta	March 28, 1885 – 2024	Birmingham–Southern College	Birmingham, Alabama	Inactive	(Note: Chapter formed at Southern University, later called Birmingham–Southern College. The college closed in 2024.)
Beta Gamma	Massachusetts Beta Gamma	April 3, 1885 – 1886; 1906–2009	Massachusetts Institute of Technology	Cambridge, Massachusetts	Inactive	(Note: After going inactive, the chapter reformed by absorbing Alpha Omega (local), established in 1905.)
**Beta Delta**	Alabama Beta Delta	October 24, 1885	University of Alabama	Tuscaloosa, Alabama	Active	(Note: Chapter was formed by former members of Alpha Gamma when that fraternity went defunct.)
Beta Epsilon	Louisiana Beta Epsilon	March 4, 1887 – 2006	Tulane University	New Orleans, Louisiana	Inactive	
Beta Zeta	Vermont Beta Zeta	April 19, 1887 – 1997	University of Vermont	Burlington, Vermont	Inactive	
Beta Eta	Ohio Beta Eta	October 6, 1887 – 2003	Ohio Wesleyan University	Delaware, Ohio	Inactive	
Beta Theta	New York Beta Theta	November 11, 1887 – June 10, 2013	Cornell University	Ithaca, New York	Inactive	(Note: Chapter absorbed Beta Kappa, established in 1936.) (Note: In 2013, the national fraternity revoked the chapter's charter for violating the university's risk management policies applying to alcohol and other drugs.)
**Beta Iota**	Georgia Beta Iota	September 18, 1888	Georgia Tech	Atlanta, Georgia	Active	
**Beta Kappa**	Michigan Beta Kappa	January 17, 1888	Hillsdale College	Hillsdale, Michigan	Active	(Note: Chapter formed from Sigma Chi, established in 1883.)
**Beta Lambda**	Michigan Beta Lambda	December 8, 1888 – 1894; 1904–2005; 2013	University of Michigan	Ann Arbor, Michigan	Active	
Beta Mu	Ohio Beta Mu	December 20, 1888 – 1913	University of Wooster	Wooster, Ohio	Inactive	
Beta Nu	Georgia Beta Nu	December 9, 1888 – 1894	Middle Georgia College	Milledgeville, Georgia	Inactive	
**Beta Xi**	South Carolina Beta Xi	February 16, 1889 – 1895; 1898–2001; March 19, 2016	College of Charleston	Charleston, South Carolina	Active	
**Beta Omicron**	Michigan Beta Omicron	May 14, 1889	Albion College	Albion, Michigan	Active	(Note: Chapter formed from Extemporaneous, established in 1886.)
**Beta Pi**	Tennessee Beta Pi	October 19, 1889	Vanderbilt University	Nashville, Tennessee	Active	
**Beta Rho**	Ohio Beta Rho	June 24, 1890 – 1899; February 7, 1920	Marietta College	Marietta, Ohio	Active	(Note: After going dormant, the chapter was reformed in 1920 from Alpha DiGamma (local), established in 1859.)
Beta Sigma	Virginia Beta Sigma	October 30, 1890 – 1894	Hampden-Sydney College	Hampden-Sydney, Virginia	Inactive	
**Beta Tau** (see Iota)	Tennessee Beta Tau	February 28, 1894	Union University	Jackson, Tennessee	Active	(Note: Chapter formed at Southwestern Baptist University, now Union University, from a former chapter of Alpha Gamma.)
**Beta Upsilon**	Maine Beta Upsilon	April 10, 1891 – 1993; 2013	University of Maine	Orono, Maine	Active	(Note: Chapter formed from S.I.U. Society, established in 1889.)
Beta Phi	South Carolina Beta Phi	May 2, 1891 – 1897	Wofford College	Spartanburg, South Carolina	Inactive	
Beta Chi	Pennsylvania Beta Chi	May 8, 1891 – 1892	Haverford College	Haverford, Pennsylvania	Inactive	
Beta Psi	California Beta Psi	December 21, 1891 – 1897; 1911–1961	Stanford University	Palo Alto, California	Inactive	(Note: After going inactive, the chapter reformed from Kalmia Club (local), established in 1911.)
**Beta Omega**	Ohio Beta Omega	May 6, 1892 – 1993; 2005	Ohio State University	Columbus, Ohio	Active	
Gamma Alpha	Maine Gamma Alpha	June 25, 1892 – 1984	Colby University	Waterville, Maine	Inactive	(Note: Chapter formed from Beta Upsilon, established in 1891.)
Gamma Beta	Massachusetts Gamma Beta	January 29, 1893 – 1974	Tufts College	Medford, Massachusetts	Inactive	
**Gamma Gamma**	Indiana Gamma Gamma	November 15, 1893	Rose–Hulman Institute of Technology	Terre Haute, Indiana	Active	
Gamma Delta	Rhode Island Gamma Delta	September 21, 1894 – 1940	Brown University	Providence, Rhode Island	Inactive	
Gamma Epsilon	Texas Gamma Epsilon	March 12, 1895 – 1900	Austin College	Sherman, Texas	Inactive	
**Gamma Zeta**	Illinois Gamma Zeta	March 16, 1895	University of Illinois at Urbana–Champaign	Urbana, Illinois	Active	
**Gamma Eta**	Texas Gamma Eta	1897–1986; 1992–2018; 2026	University of Texas at Austin	Austin, Texas	Active	(Note: After going inactive, the chapter was reformed in 1992 from Alpha Omega, established in 1990.)
**Gamma Theta**	Nebraska Gamma Theta	1897	University of Nebraska–Lincoln	Lincoln, Nebraska	Active	(Note: Chapter formed from Olympic Club, established in 1896.)
**Gamma Iota**	California Gamma Iota	April 10, 1900 – 1969; 1974–2006; 2008	University of California, Berkeley	Berkeley, California	Active	
Gamma Kappa	Ohio Gamma Kappa	1901–1929	Case Western Reserve University	Cleveland, Ohio	Inactive	(Note: Chapter formed from Psi Omega, established in 1900 at Western Reserve University, now Case Western Reserve University.)
**Gamma Lambda**	Colorado Gamma Lambda	1901–1969, 1985–2002, 2022	University of Colorado	Boulder, Colorado	Active	(Note: Chapter formed from the Schwamaquegan Club, established in 1900.)
**Gamma Mu**	Kansas Gamma Mu	1901–2002, 2012	University of Kansas	Lawrence, Kansas	Active	(Note: Chapter formed from Alpha Omega, established in 1900.)
Gamma Nu	Minnesota Gamma Nu	1902–1994, 1999–2023	University of Minnesota	Minneapolis, Minnesota	Inactive	(Note: Chapter formed from Alpha Tau Lambda, established in 1901.)
Gamma Xi	Illinois Gamma Xi	1904–1940, 1989–1993	University of Chicago	Chicago, Illinois	Inactive	(Note: Chapter formed from Alpha Omega, established in 1903.)
**Gamma Omicron**	Indiana Gamma Omicron	1904	Purdue University	West Lafayette, Indiana	Active	(Note: Chapter formed from Debonair Club, established in 1930)
Gamma Pi	Washington Gamma Pi	1906–1975, 1988–2019	University of Washington	Seattle, Washington	Inactive	(Note: Chapter formed from Phi Sigma Epsilon, established in 1902.)
**Gamma Rho**	Missouri Gamma Rho	1906–2008, 2013	University of Missouri	Columbia, Missouri	Active	(Note: Chapter formed from Alpha Delta, established in 1905.)
**Gamma Sigma**	Massachusetts Gamma Sigma	1906	Worcester Polytechnic Institute	Worcester, Massachusetts	Active	(Note: Chapter formed from Arm & Hammer, established in 1904.)
Gamma Tau	Wisconsin Gamma Tau	1907–1970	University of Wisconsin	Madison, Wisconsin	Inactive	(Note: Chapter formed from Delta Alpha Omega, established in 1904.)
**Gamma Upsilon**	Iowa Gamma Upsilon	1908	Iowa State University	Ames, Iowa	Active	(Note: Chapter formed from the Black Hawks, established in 1904.)
Mu Iota		1909–2018	University of Kentucky	Lexington, Kentucky	Inactive	(Note: Chapter formed from the Midnight Imps (aka Mu Iota) local fraternity, established in 1908.)
**Gamma Phi**	Oregon Gamma Phi	1910–2000, 2016	University of Oregon	Eugene, Oregon	Active	(Note: Chapter formed from Alpha Club, established in 1907)
Gamma Chi	Washington Gamma Chi	1911–2020	Washington State University	Pullman, Washington	Inactive	(Note: Chapter formed from Sigma, established in 1907.)
Gamma Psi	Wyoming Gamma Psi	1913–2019	University of Wyoming	Laramie, Wyoming	Inactive	(Note: Chapter formed from Delta Theta Kappa, established in 1906.)
**Gamma Omega**	Pennsylvania Gamma Omega	1914–1983, 1987	Pennsylvania State University	State College, Pennsylvania	Active	(Note: Chapter formed from Delphi, established in 1909. It absorbed the Alpha chapter of Phi Lambda Theta, at the dissolution of that small national fraternity in 1938.)
Delta Alpha	Indiana Delta Alpha	1915–1992, 1997–2015	Indiana University Bloomington	Bloomington, Indiana	Inactive	(Note: Chapter formed from Emanon Club, established in 1901. In 2015, the national fraternity closed the chapter In 2015 after the emergence of an explicit video involving active members and exotic dancers.)
**Delta Beta**	Iowa Delta Beta	1915–1971, 1987–2005, 2026	University of Iowa	Iowa City, Iowa	Active	(Note: Chapter formed from the Karnak Club, established in 1913. After going dormant, it reformed as a colony in 2019.)
Delta Gamma	New York Delta Gamma	1917–2000	Colgate University	Hamilton, New York	Inactive	(Note: Chapter formed from the Madison Club, established in 1907.)
**Delta Delta**	New Hampshire Delta Delta	1917–1980, 1987–2011, 2019	University of New Hampshire	Durham, New Hampshire	Active	(Note: Chapter formed from Gamma Theta, established in 1907.)
Delta Epsilon	Texas Delta Epsilon	1918–1985, 1987–1995	Southern Methodist University	University Park, Texas	Inactive	(Note: Chapter formed from Delta Delta, established in 1916.)
Delta Zeta	Missouri Delta Zeta	1919–1940	Washington University in St. Louis	St. Louis, Missouri	Inactive	(Note: Chapter formed from Alpha Kappa Delta, established in 1916. It absorbed Chi Delta Phi in 1933.)
**Delta Eta**	Colorado Delta Eta	1920–1942, 1948–1994, 2008	Colorado State University	Ft. Collins, Colorado	Active	(Note: Chapter formed from Sigma Delta, established in 1906.)
Delta Theta	Kansas Delta Theta	1920–2022	Kansas State University	Manhattan, Kansas	Inactive	(Note: Chapter formed from Alpha Theta Chi, established in 1912.)
**Delta Iota**	Nevada Delta Iota	1921–2008, 2013	University of Nevada, Reno	Reno, Nevada	Active	(Note: Chapter formed from Phi Delta Tau, established in 1912. In 2008, the chapter was suspended for hazing.)
**Delta Kappa**	Oklahoma Delta Kappa	1921–1997, 2007	University of Oklahoma	Norman, Oklahoma	Active	(Note: Chapter formed from Zeta Tau, established in 1920.)
Delta Lambda	Ohio Delta Lambda	1922–2021	University of Cincinnati	Cincinnati, Ohio	Inactive	(Note: Chapter formed from Alpha Nu Sigma, established in 1921.)
Delta Mu	New York Delta Mu	1922–1965	Rensselaer Polytechnic Institute	Troy, New York	Inactive	(Note: Chapter formed from Tau Omega, established in 1915.)
**Delta Nu**	North Dakota Delta Nu	1922–2006, 2013	University of North Dakota	Grand Forks, North Dakota	Active	(Note: Chapter formed from Alpha Kappa Zeta, established in 1908.)
Delta Xi	Montana Delta Xi	1923–1940, 1947–2003	University of Montana – Missoula	Missoula, Montana	Inactive	(Note: Chapter formed from the Karnak Club, established in 1921.)
Delta Omicron	Iowa Delta Omicron	1923–1987, 2015–2022	Drake University	Des Moines, Iowa	Inactive	(Note: Chapter formed from Kappa Lambda, established in 1912. It absorbed Phi Gamma Lambda in 1931.)
Delta Pi	Pennsylvania Delta Pi	1923–1993	Carnegie Mellon University	Pittsburgh, Pennsylvania	Inactive	(Note: Chapter formed from Delta Xi, established in 1908.)
**Delta Rho**	Indiana Delta Rho	1924	DePauw University	Greencastle, Indiana	Active	(Note: Chapter formed from Delta Sigma Psi, established in 1912.)
Delta Sigma	New Hampshire Delta Sigma	1924–1936	Dartmouth College	Hanover, New Hampshire	Inactive	(Note: Chapter formed from Sigma Tau Omega, established in 1915.)
Delta Tau	Idaho Delta Tau	1925–2013	University of Idaho	Moscow, Idaho	Inactive	(Note: Chapter formed from Elwetas Club, established in 1920.)
Delta Upsilon	South Dakota Delta Upsilon	1926–2023	University of South Dakota	Vermillion, South Dakota	Inactive	(Note: Chapter formed from Kappa Pi Alpha, established in 1921.)
Delta Phi	California Delta Phi	1926–1969, 1973–2004	Occidental College	Los Angeles, California	Inactive	(Note: Chapter formed from Omicron Mu Alpha, established in 1900. It absorbed Phi Delta Chi in 1936. After going inactive, it reformed from the Order of Mystic Apes (local), established in 1969.)
Delta Chi	California Delta Chi	1926–1969, 1973–199x ?, 2003–2008	University of California, Los Angeles	Los Angeles, California	Inactive	(Note: Chapter formed from Kappa Tau Phi, established in 1922.)
**Delta Psi**	Mississippi Delta Psi	1927	University of Mississippi	Oxford, Mississippi	Active	(Note: Chapter formed from Omega Alpha, established in 1925.)
Delta Omega	Maine Delta Omega	1929–1962	Bowdoin College	Brunswick, Maine	Inactive	(Note: Chapter formed from Phi Delta Psi, established in 1920.)
**Epsilon Alpha**	Colorado Epsilon Alpha	1929	Colorado School of Mines	Golden, Colorado	Active	(Note: Chapter formed from Mu Epsilon Tau, established in 1920.)
Epsilon Beta	Arizona Epsilon Beta	1930–1973, 1979–1993	University of Arizona	Tucson, Arizona	Inactive	(Note: Chapter formed from Tau Upsilon, established in 1922.)
**Epsilon Gamma**	Maryland Epsilon Gamma	1930–1993, 2001	University of Maryland, College Park	College Park, Maryland	Active	(Note: Chapter formed from Delta Psi Omega, established in 1919.)
**Epsilon Delta**	North Dakota Epsilon Delta	1931	North Dakota State University	Fargo, North Dakota	Active	(Note: Chapter formed from Alpha Kappa Phi, established in 1916.)
**Epsilon Epsilon**	Mississippi Epsilon Epsilon	1932–2016, 2021-	Mississippi State University	Starkville, Mississippi	Active	(Note: Chapter formed from Kappa Gamma, established in 1927. After going dormant, it reformed as a colony in 2021.)
**Epsilon Zeta**	Louisiana Epsilon Zeta	1940–1998; March 24, 2018	Louisiana State University	Baton Rouge, Louisiana	Active	(Note: Chapter formed from Theta Kappa Beta, established in 1919.)
Epsilon Eta	Michigan Epsilon Eta	1940–2015	Michigan State University	East Lansing, Michigan	Inactive	(Note: Chapter formed from the Eclectic Society, established in 1877.)
Epsilon Theta	Ohio Epsilon Theta	1941–2011	Baldwin–Wallace College	Berea, Ohio	Inactive	(Note: Chapter formed from Phi Kappa Phi, established in 1915.)
Epsilon Iota	District of Columbia Epsilon Iota	1943–2001	American University	Washington, D.C.	Inactive	(Note: Chapter formed from Alpha Theta Phi, established in 1928.)
**Epsilon Kappa**	Ohio Epsilon Kappa	1943–1993, 2008	Bowling Green State University	Bowling Green, Ohio	Active	(Note: Chapter formed from Delhi, established in 1923.)
Epsilon Lambda	Oklahoma Epsilon Lambda	1944–1971	University of Tulsa	Tulsa, Oklahoma	Inactive	(Note: Chapter formed from Delta Sigma Xi, established in 1938.)
Epsilon Mu	Vermont Epsilon Mu	1947–1965	Middlebury College	Middlebury, Vermont	Inactive	(Note: Chapter formed from Sigma Alpha, established in 1939.)
Epsilon Nu	Illinois Epsilon Nu	1947–2024	Monmouth College	Monmouth, Illinois	Inactive	(Note: Chapter formed from Phi Kappa Pi, established in 1884.)
Epsilon Xi	Illinois Epsilon Xi	1947–1996	Northwestern University	Evanston, Illinois	Inactive	(Note: Chapter formed from Phi Mu Delta, established in 1921.)
**Epsilon Omicron**	Oklahoma Epsilon Omicron	May 24, 1947 – 1972; 1978	Oklahoma State University–Stillwater	Stillwater, Oklahoma	Active	
Epsilon Pi	British Columbia Epsilon Pi	1947–1971	University of British Columbia	Vancouver, British Columbia	Inactive	(Note: Chapter formed from Tau Omega, established in 1940.)
Epsilon Rho	Delaware Epsilon Rho	1949–1985, 199x ?–2005	University of Delaware	Newark, Delaware	Inactive	(Note: Chapter formed from Alpha Sigma Delta, established in 1947.)
Epsilon Sigma	Florida Epsilon Sigma	1949–2007, 2010–August 2020	Florida State University	Tallahassee, Florida	Inactive	(Note: Chapter formed from Alpha Theta Phi, established in 1947. In 2020, it was suspended for five years, following incidents of hazing and alcohol use.)
**Epsilon Tau**	Utah Epsilon Tau	1949–1953, 2002–2009	University of Utah	Salt Lake City, Utah	Colony	(Note: Chapter reformed as a colony in 2017.)
**Epsilon Upsilon**	Mississippi Epsilon Upsilon	1949	University of Southern Mississippi	Hattiesburg, Mississippi	Active	(Note: Chapter formed from Sigma Zeta, established in 1937.)
Epsilon Phi	New York Epsilon Phi	1950–1974, 1985–2019	Syracuse University	Syracuse, New York	Inactive	(Note: Chapter formed from Sigma Beta, established in 1911.)
**Epsilon Chi**	California Epsilon Chi	1950–1970, 1977–2004, 2010	San Jose State University	San Jose, California	Active	(Note: Chapter formed from Delta Theta Omega, established in 1926.)
Epsilon Psi	California Epsilon Psi	1950–1994	San Diego State University	San Diego, California	Inactive	(Note: Chapter formed from Tau Delta Chi, established in 1926.)
Epsilon Omega	North Carolina Epsilon Omega	1951–1971	Davidson College	Davidson, North Carolina	Inactive	(Note: Chapter formed from Kappa Kappa, established in 1947.)
**Zeta Alpha**	Arizona Zeta Alpha	1950–1972, 1986–1993	Arizona State University	Tempe, Arizona	Colony	(Note: Chapter formed from Lambda Phi Sigma, established in 1925. It was re-established as a colony in 2024.)
Zeta Beta	California Zeta Beta	1951–2014	University of Southern California	Los Angeles, California	Inactive	(Note: Chapter formed from Alpha Tau, established in 1948.)
Zeta Gamma	Colorado Zeta Gamma	1951–1959, 1966–1997	University of Denver	Denver, Colorado	Inactive	
Zeta Delta	Oregon Zeta Delta	1952–1973	Linfield College	McMinnville, Oregon	Inactive	(Note: Chapter formed from Phi Epsilon, established in 1905.)
Zeta Epsilon	Florida Zeta Epsilon	1952–1998	University of Miami	Coral Gables, Florida	Inactive	(Note: Chapter formed from Alpha Tau Alpha, established in 1950.)
**Zeta Zeta**	Ohio Zeta Zeta	1953–1970, 1988	Kent State University	Kent, Ohio	Active	(Note: Chapter formed from Alpha Phi Beta, established in 1931.)
**Zeta Eta**	Texas Zeta Eta	1953–200x ?, 2007	Texas Tech University	Lubbock, Texas	Active	(Note: Chapters formed from the Wranglers, established in 1929.)
**Zeta Theta**	Texas Zeta Theta	1957–2011, 2015	Lamar University	Beaumont, Texas	Active	(Note: Chapter formed from the Cavaliers, established in 1952.)
Zeta Iota	Ohio Zeta Iota	1958–1994	Denison University	Granville, Ohio	Inactive	
**Zeta Kappa**	Texas Zeta Kappa	1959	West Texas A&M University	Canyon, Texas	Active	(Note: Chapter formed from Tau Tau Tau, established in 1936.)
**Zeta Lambda**	Kentucky Zeta Lambda	1959	Murray State University	Murray, Kentucky	Active	(Note: Chapter formed from Beta Tau Beta, established in 1956.)
**Zeta Mu**	Texas Zeta Mu	1960–1998, 2003	Sam Houston State University	Huntsville, Texas	Active	(Note: Chapter formed from the Dons, established in 1955.)
**Zeta Nu**	Oklahoma Zeta Nu	1962–2007, 2014	University of Central Oklahoma	Edmond, Oklahoma	Active	(Note: Chapter formed from Phi Lambda Chi, established in 1954.)
Zeta Xi	Michigan Zeta Xi	1962–1998	Kettering University	Flint, Michigan	Inactive	(Note: Chapter formed from Omega Epsilon, established in 1926.)
Zeta Omicron	Indiana Zeta Omicron	1963–2015	Indiana State University	Terre Haute, Indiana	Inactive	
Zeta Pi	Tennessee Zeta Pi	1964–2014	University of Tennessee at Martin	Martin, Tennessee	Inactive	
Zeta Rho	Tennessee Zeta Rho	1965–1980, 1987–2017	University of Memphis	Memphis, Tennessee	Inactive	(Note: In 2017, the chapter was suspended for five years due to hazing pledges and not complying with other university rules.)
Zeta Sigma	Minnesota Zeta Sigma	1965–1998	Hamline University	Saint Paul, Minnesota	Inactive	(Note: Chapter formed from Phi Delta, established in 1910.)
Zeta Tau	Virginia Zeta Tau	1965–2001	Old Dominion University	Norfolk, Virginia	Inactive	(Note: Chapter formed from T.I.G.A., established in 1930.)
Zeta Upsilon	Nebraska Zeta Upsilon	1966–2016	University of Nebraska at Kearney	Kearney, Nebraska	Inactive	(Note: Chapter formed from Phi Tau Gamma, established 1915.)
Zeta Phi	Texas Zeta Phi	1966–1992	Texas A&M University–Kingsville	Kingsville, Texas	Inactive	(Note: Chapter formed from Tau Delta Chi, established in 1957.)
Zeta Chi	Louisiana Zeta Chi	1966–2012	Louisiana Tech University	Ruston, Louisiana	Inactive	(Note: Chapter formed from Kappa Tau, established in 1964.)
Zeta Psi	South Carolina Zeta Psi	1967–1997	Newberry College	Newberry, South Carolina	Inactive	(Note: Chapter formed from Phi Tau, established in 1929.)
**Zeta Omega**	Kentucky Zeta Omega	1967–1976; September 21, 2012	Western Kentucky University	Bowling Green, Kentucky	Active	(Note: Chapter formed from Beta Alpha Rho, established in 1934.)
Eta Alpha	Florida Eta Alpha	1967–2004	University of South Florida	Tampa, Florida	Inactive	(Note: Chapter formed from Talos, established in 1961.)
**Eta Beta**	Georgia Eta Beta	1968–1987; November 10, 2018	Georgia State University	Atlanta, Georgia	Active	
**Eta Gamma**	Arkansas Eta Gamma	1968	Arkansas State University	Jonesboro, Arkansas	Active	(Note: Chapter formed from Chi Sigma, established in 1964.)
Eta Delta	Minnesota Eta Delta	1968–1975	Minnesota State University, Mankato	Mankato, Minnesota	Inactive	(Note: Chapter formed from Tau Omega, established in 1964.)
Eta Epsilon	Nevada Eta Epsilon	1968–2023	University of Nevada, Las Vegas	Paradise, Nevada	Inactive	
**Eta Zeta**	Georgia Eta Zeta	1968	Georgia Southern University	Statesboro, Georgia	Active	(Note: Chapter formed from Delta Pi Alpha, established in 1963.)
Eta Eta	Georgia Eta Eta	1968–1977	Athens State University	Athens, Alabama	Inactive	(Note: Chapter formed from Delta Sigma Chi, established in 1965.)
Eta Theta	Alabama Eta Theta	1969–2002	Jacksonville State University	Jacksonville, Alabama	Active	
**Eta Iota**	Texas Eta Iota	1969–2022	Stephen F. Austin State University	Nacogdoches, Texas	Active	(Note: Chapter formed from Kappa Sigma Phi, established in 1966.)
**Eta Kappa**	New Mexico Eta Kappa	1969–199x ?, 2011	University of New Mexico	Albuquerque, New Mexico	Active	
Eta Lambda	Tennessee Eta Lambda	1969–2022	Tennessee Technological University	Cookeville, Tennessee	Inactive	(Note: Chapter formed from Kappa Phi Lambda, established in 1965.)
Eta Mu	Florida Eta Mu	1969–2016, 2023	Florida Atlantic University	Boca Raton, Florida	Active	
**Eta Nu**	Tennessee Eta Nu	1970–1986; September 11, 1998	Middle Tennessee State University	Murfreesboro, Tennessee	Active	(Note: Chapter formed from Alpha Pi Omega, established in 1968. After going dormant, it reformed in 1998 from Zeta Upsilon Pi (local), established in 1997.)
Eta Xi	West Virginia Eta Xi	1971–1983	Salem International University	Salem, West Virginia	Inactive	(Note: Chapter formed from Alpha Delta Chi, established in 1964.)
**Eta Omicron**	California Eta Omicron	1971	Culver–Stockton College	Canton, Missouri	Active	(Note: Chapter formed from Beta Gamma Phi, established in 1967.)
**Eta Pi**	South Carolina Eta Pi	May 7, 1971 – 1998'; 2005	Clemson University	Clemson, South Carolina	Active	(Note: Chapter formed from Delta Kappa Alpha, established in 1959.)
**Eta Rho**	Florida Eta Rho	1971	University of Central Florida	Orlando, Florida	Active	(Note: Chapter formed from Tau Alpha Omega, established in 1968.)
Eta Sigma	Minnesota Eta Sigma	1971–1975	Bemidji State University	Bemidji, Minnesota	Inactive	(Note: Chapter formed from Alpha Nu Omega, established in 1962.)
**Eta Tau**	Tennessee Eta Tau	September 18, 1971 – 1980; 2009	Austin Peay State University	Clarksville, Tennessee	Active	(Note: Chapter formed from Zeta Phi Alpha, established in 1970.)
Eta Upsilon	Illinois Eta Upsilon	1971–2000	Western Illinois University	Macomb, Illinois	Inactive	(Note: Chapter formed from Epsilon Chi, established in 1970.)
Eta Phi	Georgia Eta Phi	1971–2016	University of West Georgia	Carrollton, Georgia	Inactive	(Note: Chapter formed from Kappa Phi, established in 1968.)
Eta Chi	Louisiana Eta Chi	1972–19xx ?	Southeastern Louisiana University	Hammond, Louisiana	Inactive	(Note: Chapter formed from Sigma Alpha Kappa, established in 1968.)
**Eta Psi**	Florida Eta Psi	March 25, 1973 – 1976; 1990	University of West Florida	Pensacola, Florida	Active	(Note: Chapter formed from Pi Kappa Epsilon, established in 1968.)
**Eta Omega**	Alabama Eta Omega	1972	University of Montevallo	Montevallo, Alabama	Active	(Note: Chapter formed from Theta Sigma Chi, established in 1962.)
**Theta Alpha**	Indiana Theta Alpha	1972–2002; January 15, 2011	Ball State University	Muncie, Indiana	Active	(Note: Chapter formed from Delta Kappa Sigma, established in 1971.)
Theta Beta	Texas Theta Beta	1972–1981	Tyler Junior College	Tyler, Texas	Inactive	(Note: Chapter formed from Alpha Omega, established in 1970.)
Theta Gamma	Pennsylvania Theta Gamma	1973–199x ?, 2003–2015	Duquesne University	Pittsburgh, Pennsylvania	Inactive	(Note: Chapter formed from Alpha Epsilon, established in 1947.)
**Theta Delta**	Virginia Theta Delta	1973–200x ?; 2014	Virginia Tech	Blackburg, Virginia	Active	(Note: Chapter formed from Phi Kappa Alpha, established in 1968.)
Theta Epsilon	Texas Theta Epsilon	1973–2004	Houston Baptist University	Houston, Texas	Inactive	(Note: Chapter formed from Sigma Phi Chi, established in 1968.)
Theta Zeta	Illinois Theta Zeta	1973–2016	Southern Illinois University	Carbondale, Illinois	Inactive	
**Theta Eta**	Alabama Theta Eta	January 30, 1974	University of North Alabama	Florence, Alabama	Active	
Theta Theta	Illinois Theta Theta	1975–2017	Illinois State University	Normal, Illinois	Inactive	
**Theta Iota**	Illinois Theta Iota	1975	Millikin University	Decatur, Illinois	Active	
**Theta Kappa**	New Mexico Theta Kappa	1976	New Mexico State University	Las Cruces, New Mexico	Active	
Theta Lambda	Ohio Theta Lambda	1977–1994, 2002–2005	Miami University	Oxford, Ohio	Inactive	
**Theta Mu**	Illinois Theta Mu	1977–1997, 2011	Elmhurst College	Elmhurst, Illinois	Active	
**Theta Nu**	Texas Theta Nu	1977–1994, 2005	Baylor University	Waco, Texas	Active	(Note: Chapter formed from Kappa Sigma Chi, established in 1953.)
Theta Xi	South Carolina Theta Xi	1978–2011	Francis Marion University	Florence, South Carolina	Inactive	(Note: Chapter formed from A.W.T., established in 1976.)
**Theta Omicron**	West Virginia Theta Omicron	1977	Marshall University	Huntington, West Virginia	Active	
**Theta Pi**	Alabama Theta Pi	1979	University of Alabama in Huntsville	Huntsville, Alabama	Active	
Theta Rho	Missouri Theta Rho	1979–2013	Truman State University	Kirksville, Missouri	Inactive	
**Theta Sigma**	Texas Theta Sigma	September 11, 1979 – 2007, 2013	Texas A&M University	College Station, Texas	Active	
Theta Tau	Kansas Theta Tau	1980–1996	Wichita State University	Wichita, Kansas	Inactive	
Theta Upsilon	Tennessee Theta Upsilon	1980–1987	University of Tennessee at Chattanooga	Chattanooga, Tennessee	Inactive	
**Theta Phi**	Alabama Theta Phi	1980–2004, 2013	University of Alabama at Birmingham	Birmingham, Alabama	Active	
Theta Chi	Pennsylvania Theta Chi	1982–2003	Indiana University of Pennsylvania	Indiana, Pennsylvania	Inactive	
**Theta Psi**	Florida Theta Psi	1983	Stetson University	DeLand, Florida	Active	(Note: Chapter formed from Gamma Chi, established in 1980.)
**Theta Omega**	Kentucky Theta Omega	1983	Northern Kentucky University	Highland Heights, Kentucky	Active	
Iota Alpha	Texas Iota Alpha	1986–2017	Texas State University	San Marcos, Texas	Inactive	(Note: In 2017, the chapter was suspended for three years after the alcohol-related death of a student at a party it co-hosted with other fraternities.)
Iota Beta	South Carolina Iota Beta	1986–2016	Lander University	Greenwood, South Carolina	Inactive	(Note: Chapter formed from Tau Kappa Iota, established in 1984.)
Iota Gamma	Maryland Iota Gamma	1988–1995	University of Maryland, Baltimore County	Catonsville, Maryland	Inactive	
**Iota Delta**	Pennsylvania Iota Delta	1988	Widener University	Chester, Pennsylvania	Active	(Note: Chapter formed from Lambda Phi Omega, established in the 1960s.)
**Iota Epsilon**	Texas Iota Epsilon	1988–20xx ?, 2012	University of Texas at San Antonio	San Antonio, Texas	Active	
Iota Zeta	Florida Iota Zeta	1989–2010	Rollins College	Winter Park, Florida	Inactive	
Iota Eta	California Iota Eta	1989–2003	California State Polytechnic University, Pomona	Pomona, California	Inactive	(Note: Chapter formed from Nu Phi Omega, established in 1986.)
Iota Theta	California Iota Theta	1990–2011	University of California, Riverside	Riverside, California	Inactive	
**Iota Iota**	Arizona Iota Iota	1990–2007	Northern Arizona University	Flagstaff, Arizona	Colony	(Note: Chapter was reformed as a colony in 2024.)
Iota Kappa	Delaware Iota Kappa	1990–2000	Goldey–Beacom College	Wilmington, Delaware	Inactive	
Iota Lambda	Ohio Iota Lambda	1990–1997	Otterbein University	Westerville, Ohio	Inactive	
Iota Mu	New York Iota Mu	1990–1999	University at Albany, SUNY	Albany, New York	Inactive	
**Iota Nu**	California Iota Nu	1991	University of California, Santa Barbara	Isla Vista, California	Active	
Iota Xi	New York Iota Xi	1991–2002	University at Buffalo	Buffalo, New York	Inactive	
Iota Omicron	Pennsylvania Iota Omicron	1991–2001	Villanova University	Villanova, Pennsylvania	Inactive	
**Iota Pi**	North Carolina Iota Pi	1991–2008, 2012	Appalachian State University	Boone, North Carolina	Active	
Iota Rho	Rhode Island Iota Rho	1992–1995	Johnson & Wales University	Providence, Rhode Island	Inactive	
**Iota Sigma**	Missouri Iota Sigma	1992	University of Central Missouri	Warrensburg, Missouri	Active	
Iota Tau	Rhode Island Iota Tau	1994–2014	University of Rhode Island	North Kingstown, Rhode Island	Inactive	
Iota Upsilon	Michigan Iota Upsilon	1995–2023	Western Michigan University	Kalamazoo, Michigan	Inactive	
Iota Phi	Tennessee Iota Phi	1999–2017	Belmont University	Nashville, Tennessee	Inactive	(Note: Chapter formed from Sigma Chi Delta.)
Iota Chi	Alabama Iota Chi	2001–2008	Auburn University at Montgomery	Montgomery, Alabama	Inactive	
**Iota Psi**	Pennsylvania Iota Psi	2001	Temple University	Philadelphia, Pennsylvania	Active	
Iota Omega	Pennsylvania Iota Omega	2003–2020	Bloomsburg University of Pennsylvania	Bloomsburg, Pennsylvania	Inactive	(Note: Chapter formed from Theta Chi Lambda, established in the 1990s.)
**Kappa Alpha**	Texas Kappa Alpha	2004	University of Texas at Arlington	Arlington, Texas	Active	
**Kappa Beta**	Alabama Kappa Beta	2005	Troy University	Troy, Alabama	Active	
Kappa Gamma	Texas Kappa Gamma	2006–2023	University of North Texas	Denton, Texas	Inactive	
**Kappa Delta**	North Carolina Kappa Delta	2007–2015	North Carolina State University	Raleigh, North Carolina	Colony	(Note: The chapter was removed from campus in 2015 for allegations of sexual assault and drug-related activities. It was reformed as a colony in 2021.)
**Kappa Epsilon**	California Kappa Epsilon	2007	Pepperdine University	Malibu, California	Active	
Kappa Zeta	Virginia Kappa Zeta	2007 – November 19, 2015	James Madison University	Harrisonburg, Virginia	Inactive	(Note: The university and national fraternity closed the chapter for multiple violations of probation.)
**Kappa Eta**		November 17, 2007	Florida Institute of Technology	Melbourne, Florida	Active	
Kappa Theta		January 12, 2008 – 2014	Eastern Illinois University	Charleston, Illinois	Inactive	
Kappa Iota		December 13, 2008 – 2019	University of North Carolina Wilmington	Wilmington, North Carolina	Inactive	
**Kappa Kappa**		January 31, 2009	College of William and Mary	Williamsburg, Virginia	Active	
**Kappa Lambda**		September 26, 2009	Grand Valley State University	Allendale, Michigan	Active	
**Kappa Mu**		December 11, 2010	University of North Florida	Jacksonville, Florida	Active	
**Kappa Nu**		November 12, 2011	Arkansas Tech University	Russellville, Arkansas	Active	
**Kappa Xi**		October 2012	East Carolina University	Greenville, North Carolina	Active	
Kappa Omicron		January 11, 2014 – 2023	University of Louisville	Louisville, Kentucky	Inactive	
Kappa Pi		2012–2021	Utah State University	Logan, Utah	Inactive	
**Kappa Rho**		2015	Samford University	Birmingham, Alabama	Active	
**Kappa Sigma**		October 3, 2015	University of South Alabama	Mobile, Alabama	Active	
**Kappa Tau**		2016	Eastern Kentucky University	Richmond, Kentucky	Active	
**Kappa Upsilon**		April 23, 2016	University of Tampa	Tampa, Florida	Active	
**Kappa Phi**		November 29, 2016	Lake Forest College	Lake Forest, Illinois	Active	
**Kappa Chi**		January 28, 2017	West Chester University	West Chester, Pennsylvania	Active	
**Kappa Psi**		March 25, 2017	University of Pittsburgh	Pittsburgh, Pennsylvania	Active	
**Kappa Omega**		April 4, 2017	Georgia College and State University	Milledgeville, Georgia	Active	
**Lambda Alpha**		October 14, 2017	Florida Gulf Coast University	Fort Myers, Florida	Active	
**Lambda Beta**		June 6, 2018	Santa Clara University	Santa Clara, California	Inactive	
**Lambda Gamma**		April 6, 2019	Boise State University	Boise, Idaho	Active	
**Lambda Delta**		April 20, 2019	University of North Carolina at Charlotte	Charlotte, North Carolina	Active	
**Lambda Epsilon**		2019	Kennesaw State University	Kennesaw, Georgia	Active	
Lambda Zeta		2019–2024	University of San Diego	San Diego, California	Inactive	
**Lambda Eta**		April 12, 2025	University of Texas at Tyler	Tyler, Texas	Active	(Note: Colony established in 2019.)
