= Phi Delta Kappa =

Phi Delta Kappa may refer to:

- Phi Delta Kappa (fraternity), American collegiate fraternity (1874–1881)
- Phi Delta Kappa International, commonly called PDK International, an international professional education organization
- Phi Delta Kappa (sorority), African-American professional education sorority (established 1923)
