= Kappa Phi Lambda (fraternity) =

American college fraternity (1862–1874)

- ΚΦΛ
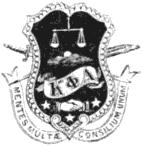
- Founded: 1859; 167 years ago August 3, 1862; Jefferson College
- Type: Social
- Affiliation: Independent
- Status: Defunct
- Defunct date: 1948
- Successor: Scattered
- Scope: National
- Motto: Mentes Multæ Consilium Unum "Many Minds Conspire One"
- Symbol: A Balance; a Sunburst; a Mountain
- Publication: The Palladium
- Chapters: 10
- Headquarters: Canonsburg, Pennsylvania; United States

Kappa Phi Lambda (ΚΦΛ) was an American collegiate fraternity. It was established in 1862 at Jefferson College and was dissolved in 1874. Kappa Phi Lambda is considered one of the members of the "Jefferson Triad" of fraternities founded at Jefferson College, with the other two being Phi Gamma Delta and Phi Kappa Psi. However, with the demise of Kappa Phi Lambda, the remaining two fraternities are known as the Jefferson Duo.

== History ==
Kappa Phi Lambda was established as a local fraternity in 1869.at Jefferson College in Canonsburg, Pennsylvania (now Washington & Jefferson College). Its founder was Jacob Janeway Belville.

On August 3, 1862, it was incorporated as a national fraternity and added a chapter at Mount Union College. Other chapters were formed at University of Michigan, Monmouth College, Northwestern University, Moore's Hill, Ohio Wesleyan University, University of Virginia, Denison University, Westminster College (Pennsylvania), Western University of Pennsylvania.

A national Kappa Phi Lambda convention was held in Philadelphia in 1867. Following that convention, the Denison University chapter became disenchanted with the authoritarianism of the national leadership and joined the Beta Theta Pi.

Following dissolution in 1874, the Mount Union College chapter joined Delta Tau Delta, the University of Michigan chapter joined Psi Upsilon, and the Northwestern University chapter joined Sigma Chi.

The last known chapter of Kappa Phi Lambda was at Westminster College (Pennsylvania). It operated sub-rosa until 1920 and petitioned Phi Gamma Delta. In 1948, it became the Epsilon Pi chapter of Sigma Nu.

== Symbols ==
The fraternity's official badge consisted of a shield, with a balance, a sunburst, a mountain, and a pennant bearing the fraternity's letters. Its motto was Mentes Multæ Consilium Unum or "Many Minds Conspire One". Its publication was The Palladium.

== Chapters ==
These are the known chapters of Kappa Phi Lambda Fraternity. Chapter names are conjectural, from the order in Baird's Manual. The fraternity is dormant, while some chapters lived on as part of other fraternities.

Chapter	Charter date and range	Institution	City	State	Status	Ref.
Alpha	1859–1869	Jefferson College	Cannonsburg	Pennsylvania	Inactive	(Note: The "PhiGam" reference explains this chapter began in 1859, explaining that the Baird's date in 1862 is incorrect. 1859 appears correct, due to the level of detail in the PhiGam reference. Nevertheless, the fraternity appears to have celebrated the 1862 date. Perhaps as the date of becoming a national?) (Note: Chapter ceased under anti-fraternity pressure as Jefferson College merged with Washington College, in 1865-1868.)
Beta ?	August 3, 1862 – 1874	Mount Union College	Alliance	Ohio	Merged (ΔΤΔ)	(Note: Chapter became the Sigma Prime chapter of Delta Tau Delta, lasting in that form until 1886.)
Gamma ?	1865–1870	University of Michigan	Ann Arbor	Michigan	Dispersed (ΨΥ, others)	(Note: When the chapter closed, its members joined several fraternities, with the majority entering the existing Phi chapter of Psi Upsilon)
Delta ?	186x ? – 187x ?	Monmouth College	Monmouth	Illinois	Inactive	
Epsilon ?	1864–1869	Northwestern University	Evanston	Illinois	Merged (ΣΧ)	(Note: Chapter became the Omega chapter of Sigma Chi.)
Zeta ?	186x ?–18xx ?	Moores Hill Collegiate Institute	Moores Hill	Indiana	Inactive	
Eta ?	1864–187x ?	Ohio Wesleyan University	Delaware	Ohio	Inactive	
Theta ?	1864–1874	University of Virginia	Charlottesville	Virginia	Inactive	
Iota ?	1867–1869	Denison University	Granville	Ohio	Merged (ΒΘΠ)	(Note: Chapter formed from Eta Eta (local), established in 1866. Its became the Alpha Eta chapter of Beta Theta Pi.)
Kappa ?	1864–1948	Westminster College	New Wilmington	Pennsylvania	Merged (ΣΝ)	. (Note: This chapter continued as a local fraternity after the end of the fraternity. In 1948 it became the Epsilon Psi chapter of Sigma Nu)

== Notable members ==
Notable alumni include Robert M. Nevin, a Congressman from Ohio.

== See also ==
- List of social fraternities and sororities
