= Iota Alpha Kappa =

American collegiate fraternity (1858–1874)

- ΙΑΚ
- Founded: 1858; 168 years ago Union College
- Type: Social
- Affiliation: Independent
- Status: Defunct
- Defunct date: 1874
- Scope: National
- Chapters: 20 ?
- Headquarters: United States

Iota Alpha Kappa (ΙΑΚ) was an American collegiate fraternity. It was established at Union College in 1858 and was dissolved in 1874.

== History ==
Iota Alpha Kappa was founded at Union College in 1858. Roughly twenty chapters were developed, including at Lafayette College, Washington & Jefferson College, Columbia College and Norwich University. Membership was not restricted to college students. In 1874, the fraternity was dissolved at a convention held in Easton, Pennsylvania.

Following dissolution, the Washington & Jefferson College chapter founded the Phi Delta Kappa fraternity and became its first chapter. Following the collapse of Phi Delta Kappa, that chapter joined Phi Gamma Delta, restoring that fraternity's Alpha chapter.

== Chapters ==
Known chapters include the following.

Charter date and range	Institution	City	State	Status	Ref.
1858–18xx ?	Union College	Schenectady	New York	Inactive	
1863–1874	Lafayette College	Easton	Pennsylvania	Withdrew (ΧΦ)	(Note: Withdrew at national dissolution to become Chi Phi's Rho chapter.)
1872–1873	Lehigh University	Bethlehem	Pennsylvania	Inactive (some to ΧΦ)	(Note: With national dissolution looming, several members of this new chapter withdrew to join the existing Psi chapter of Chi Phi, which had also formed in 1872, at Lehigh.)
1873–1874	Washington & Jefferson College	Washington	Pennsylvania	Withdrew (ΦΔΚ)	(Note: Withdrew at national dissolution to form its own national, eventually creating five chapters. When these failed, it was affiliated to restore Phi Gamma Delta's Alpha chapter in 1881.)
1873–1874	Columbia University	New York City	New York	Inactive	(Note: The Columbia chapter appears to have dissipated with no successor.)
187x ?–187x ?	Norwich University	Northfield	Vermont	Inactive	(Note: The Norwich chapter appears to have dissipated with no successor. All remaining fraternities ceased operation at Norwich in 1959.)
