= Phi Delta Kappa (fraternity) =

American collegiate fraternity (1874–1881)

- ΦΔΚ
- Founded: 1874; 152 years ago Washington & Jefferson College
- Type: Social
- Affiliation: Independent
- Status: Defunct
- Defunct date: 1881
- Scope: National
- Chapters: 5
- Headquarters: Washington, Pennsylvania; United States

Phi Delta Kappa (ΦΔΚ) was an American collegiate fraternity which dissolved in 1881.

== History ==
It was founded in 1874 at Washington & Jefferson College in Washington, Pennsylvania when a chapter of Iota Alpha Kappa resolved to continue after Iota Alpha Kappa's dissolution. A total of five chapters were formed, but by 1880, four of the five, except for Washington & Jefferson College had become extinct. That chapter sought to survive by joining another fraternity. In 1881, the Washington & Jefferson College chapter joined Phi Gamma Delta, taking the designation of Alpha chapter, a designation that had belonged to the founding chapter of Phi Gamma Delta at Jefferson College.

== Chapters ==
Five chapters were established, but all failed by 1880 except for the Alpha chapter which was absorbed to restore the Alpha chapter of Phi Gamma Delta. Following is a list of the chapters of Phi Delta Kappa.

Chapter	Charter date and range	Institution	City	State	Status	Ref.
Alpha	1874–1881	Washington & Jefferson College	Washington	Pennsylvania	Withdrew (ΦΓΔ)	(Note: This chapter had its origination in an unnamed chapter of Iota Alpha Kappa, in 1873. Withdrew when that fraternity dissolved to form Phi Delta Kappa, eventually creating five chapters. When these failed, it was affiliated to restore Phi Gamma Delta's Alpha chapter in 1881.)
Beta	1876–1880	University of Pittsburgh	Pittsburgh	Pennsylvania	Inactive	(Note: At the time this chapter was formed, the school was called Western University of Pennsylvania.)
Gamma	1876–1880	Thiel College	Greenville	Pennsylvania	Inactive	
Delta	1876–1880	Lafayette College	Easton	Pennsylvania	Inactive	
Epsilon	1878–1880	Tulane University	New Orleans	Louisiana	Inactive	(Note: At the time this chapter was formed, Tulane was called Tulane University of Louisiana.)
