= Alpha Gamma =

American collegiate fraternity (1867-c.1880)

- ΑΓ
- Founded: 1867; 159 years ago Cumberland University
- Type: Secret
- Affiliation: Independent
- Status: Defunct
- Defunct date: c. 1880s
- Scope: National
- Chapters: 21
- Members: 350 lifetime
- Headquarters: United States

Alpha Gamma (ΑΓ) was an American collegiate fraternity. It was founded at Cumberland University in Lebanon, Tennessee in 1867. The fraternity expanded to include 21 chapter, which all closed in the 1880s.

== History ==
Alpha Gamma was founded at Cumberland University in Lebanon, Tennessee in 1867. It was a secret society. Its founders were L. Black, C. N. Campbell, W. G. Campbell, A. B. Goodbar, M. S. Matheny, and W. T. Nixon. In December 1869, a bill was passed by the Tennessee Legislature to incorporate Alpha Gamma Fraternity.

The fraternity referred to its chapters as lodges. Because of the secret nature of the fraternity and bans against secret societies at the time, many of its lodges operated sub rosa. Many chapters met under the guise of being a literary society, going to the extreme of creating a bogus constitution for a literary society. Of its 21 chapters; twelve of these are known. Prominent chapters were located at Cumberland University, Mercersburg College, Southwestern Presbyterian University, Trinity College (Duke), Washington & Jefferson College, and the West Virginia University.

In August 1875, Alpha Gamma held a national convention in Clarksville, Tennessee. Delegates attended from Mercerburg College, Southwestern Presbyterian University, the University of Alabama, and Washington & Jefferson College. A local newspaper reported that attendance was smaller than usual. The chapter at Mercersburg College held a reunion on July 13, 1888.

The fraternity eventually disbanded, with Baird's Manual of American College Fraternities indicating that this occurred in the 1880s. Many chapter closed because of local anti-fraternity laws and policies, including the Trinity College (Duke University) and West Virginia University chapters. Several chapters, including those at Washington & Jefferson College, Southwestern Presbyterian University, became chapters of Alpha Tau Omega. Some members of the chapter a Southwestern Presbyterian University, split off to form the Stewart Literary Society. The Washington and Lee chapter joined Chi Phi. These chapter withdrawals occurred over several years, with no specific merger process. The fraternity had approximately 350 members.

== Symbols ==
The Alpha Gamma badge consisted of a golden shield with a globe that was encircled by a pendant with the Greek letters ΑΓ. At its top were six stars that represent the fraternity's six founders.

== Chapters ==
Known chapters of Alpha Gamma include the following, with inactive chapters and institutions in italics. The fraternity appears to have reassigned chapter names as its roster was updated; the chapter that housed its headquarters was called Alpha chapter.

| Chapter | Charter date and range | Institution | Location | Status | Ref. |
|---|---|---|---|---|---|
| Alpha (also called Iota) | March 1867 – 18xx ? | Cumberland University | Lebanon, Tennessee | Inactive | |
| Beta (also called Alpha and Sigma) | 18xx ? – March 12, 1882 | Washington & Jefferson College | Washington, Pennsylvania | Withdrew (ΑΤΩ) | (Note: Became the Alpha Pi chapter of Alpha Tau Omega. In 1883, soon after the merger, this chapter closed. Alpha Tau Omega reopened it in 1901.) |
| Gamma (also called Eta) | 18xx ?–18xx ? | Trinity College (now Duke University) | Durham, North Carolina | Inactive | (Note: Chapter closed due to anti-fraternity legislation.) |
| Delta (also called Alpha and Zeta) | 18xx ?–18xx ? | Mercersburg College | Mercersburg, Pennsylvania | Inactive | (Note: Now a prep school, Mercersburg had a collegiate section until 1893.) |
| | 186x ? – February 19, 1872 | Washington and Lee University | Lexington, Virginia | Withdrew (ΧΦ) | (Note: Became the Nu chapter (Northern Order) of Chi Phi.) (Note: The dates for this chapter may not quite line up. The University of Illinois Almanac indicates the chapter was formed in the late 1860s, allowing it to become the Nu chapter of Chi Phi on February 19, 1872. However, this would have made the unnamed Alpha Gamma fraternity unit a chapter earlier than its implied order in Baird's' Manual. Was it Alpha Gamma's Eta chapter? Could a chapter of Chi Phi have been formed on the W&L campus independently, which then absorbed the Alpha Gamma chapter? The Chi Phi chapter appears to have withdrawn from ΑΓ in 1871, joined Chi Phi, and then gone dormant in 1878.) |
| Epsilon (also called Theta) | 1878 – April 10, 1881 | Southwestern Presbyterian University | Clarksville, Tennessee | Withdrew (ΑΤΩ) | (Note: During its existence, this college was situated in Clarksville, Tennessee; it moved to Memphis in 1925. It became the Alpha Tau chapter of Alpha Tau Omega. Before its withdrawal, some of its members split off to form the Stewart Literary Society (local).) |
| Zeta (also called Pi) | 18xx ?–18xx ? | West Virginia University | Morgantown, West Virginia | Inactive | |
| Eta ? | 1872–18xx ? | University of Tennessee | Knoxville, Tennessee | Inactive | |
| Theta (also called Omicron) | 1875 – October 24, 1885 | University of Alabama | Tuscaloosa, Alabama | Withdrew (ΑΤΩ) | (Note: Became the Beta Delta chapter of Alpha Tau Omega.) |
| Kappa | | East Tennessee State University | Johnson City, Tennessee | Inactive | |
| Nu | | | Savannah, Georgia | Inactive | (Note: This was an alumni chapter.) |
| Xi | | | Decatur, Alabama | Inactive | |

== See also ==
- List of social fraternities
