= Washington & Jefferson College fraternities and sororities =

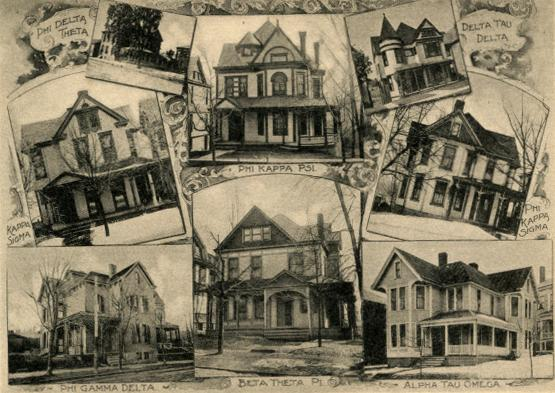
Photographic collage of the fraternity houses at Washington & Jefferson College in 1902

Washington & Jefferson College is host to 8 Greek organizations and a significant percentage of the undergraduate student body is active in Greek life. With 43% of women and 40% of men of the student body participating in "greek life," fraternities and sororities play a significant role in student life at W&J. The Princeton Review named Washington & Jefferson College 12th on their 2010 list of "Major Frat and Sorority Scene" in the United States. As of 2024, the Office of Fraternity & Sorority Life recognized 4 fraternities, Alpha Tau Omega, Beta Theta Pi, Delta Tau Delta, and Phi Kappa Psi, and 4 sororities, Delta Gamma, Kappa Alpha Theta, Kappa Kappa Gamma, and Pi Beta Phi. The fraternities are governed by a local Interfraternal Council and the sororities are governed by a local Panhellenic Council, while the Greek Judiciary manages broad policy violations at the chapter-level. All Greek organizations occupy College-owned houses on Chestnut Street on campus. All members of fraternities and sororities must pay the $100 "Greek Membership Fee," a levy designed to fund leadership seminars and other educational events for Greeks.

During the 19th century, three national fraternities were founded at Jefferson College; thus, the two surviving organizations, Phi Gamma Delta and Phi Kappa Psi are collectively known as the Jefferson Duo. A third fraternity was founded at Jefferson College, Kappa Phi Lambda, but it dissolved after a decade of existence amid a dispute between chapters. In 1874, a fourth fraternity was founded at W&J, the short-lived Phi Delta Kappa. The new fraternity grew to several chapters before falling apart in 1880.

== The greek system ==
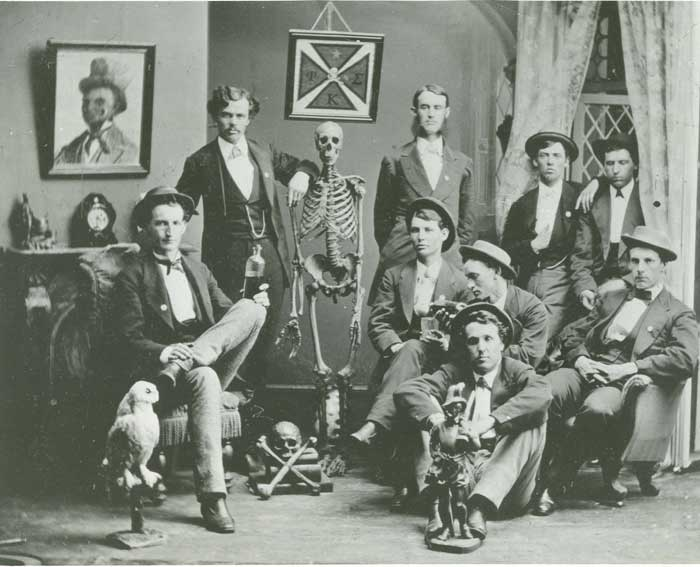
Members of Phi Kappa Sigma pose for a chapter photo in the early 1870s.

With 42% of the student body participating in "greek life," fraternities and sororities play a significant role in student life at W&J. In 1992, that percentage was as high as 65% and 49% in 2001. The Office of Fraternity & Sorority Life recognizes 4 fraternities, Alpha Tau Omega, Beta Theta Pi, Delta Tau Delta, and Phi Kappa Psi, and 4 sororities, Delta Gamma, Kappa Alpha Theta, Kappa Kappa Gamma, and Pi Beta Phi. The fraternities are governed by a local Interfraternal Council and the sororities are governed by a local Panhellenic Council, while the Greek Judiciary manages broad policy violations at the chapter-level. All members of fraternities and sororities must pay the $100 "Greek Membership Fee," a levy designed to fund leadership seminars and other educational events for Greeks.

== History ==
=== Early history and the Jefferson Duo ===
During the 19th century, three national fraternities were founded at Jefferson College. Two of them, Phi Gamma Delta and Phi Kappa Psi grew into full-fledged national fraternities and are collectively known as the Jefferson Duo.

In 1848, Phi Gamma Delta was formed in the "Fort Armstrong" dormitory at Jefferson College. While the fraternity grew in a southward direction, the Jefferson chapter survived only a short time after unification with the Washington chapter in 1865, dissolving in 1879. In 1852, the Phi Kappa Psi fraternity was founded at Jefferson College by two students who had formed a bond while treating their classmates during a typhoid outbreak on campus. By 1863, the Jefferson and Washington chapters merged, as most members had enlisted to fight in the American Civil War. In 1862, the Kappa Phi Lambda fraternity was founded at Jefferson College. It dissolved in 1874. The two surviving fraternities are colloquially referred to as the Jefferson Duo.

In 1874, a fourth fraternity was founded at W&J, when the national Iota Alpha Kappa structure dissolved, allowing the W&J chapter to reconstitute itself as a new fraternity, Phi Delta Kappa. The new fraternity grew to several chapters before falling apart in 1880. In 1881, the W&J chapter joined Phi Gamma Delta, reclaiming the "Alpha" designation that had belonged to the founding chapter at Jefferson College.

=== Modern history ===
Many of the surviving fraternities on campus were founded during the mid to late 19th century, including Beta Theta Pi at Jefferson College in 1842, Delta Tau Delta in 1861 at both Jefferson and Washington Colleges, Phi Kappa Sigma in 1854, Phi Delta Theta in 1875, and Alpha Tau Omega in 1882, which had been a chapter of Alpha Gamma before the national fraternity dissolved the previous year. A number of fraternities from that time period did not survive the union of the two colleges, including Sigma Chi, Delta Kappa Epsilon, and Delta Upsilon. The chapter of Theta Delta Chi was founded in 1858 and was dissolved in 1872. The W&J chapter of Sigma Phi Epsilon was founded in 1902 and dissolved in 1906. In the early 2000s, two fraternities that were founded in the 19th century, Kappa Sigma and Lambda Chi Alpha, had their charters revoked by their national organizations after alcohol violations, and a third, Zeta Beta Tau dissolved due to a lack of membership. All four sororities were formed during the 1970s, when women were first admitted to the College.

== Chapters ==
=== Phi Gamma Delta ===
In 1848, Phi Gamma Delta was formed in the "Fort Armstrong" dormitory at Jefferson College. While the fraternity grew in a southward direction, the Jefferson chapter survived only a short time after unification with the Washington chapter in 1865, dissolving in 1879. The Chapter was removed from W&J in the spring of the 2018-2019 school year after violations of National Chapter policy as well as College guidelines.

=== Phi Kappa Psi ===
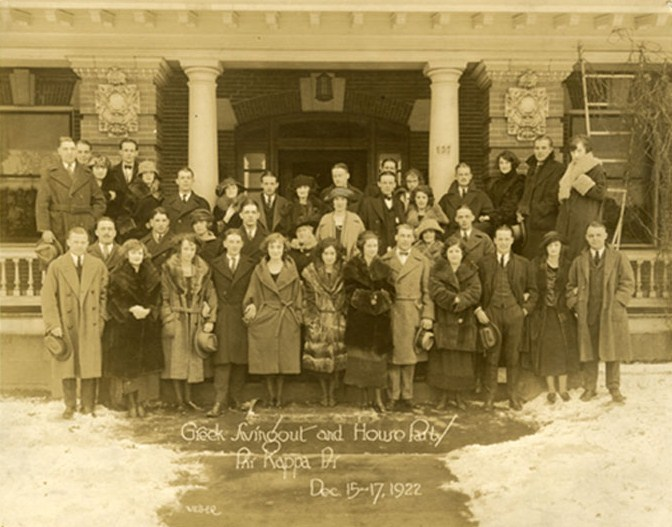
The 1922 "Greek Swingout" at the Phi Kappa Psi house

In 1852, the Phi Kappa Psi fraternity was founded at Jefferson College by two students who had formed a bond while treating their classmates during a typhoid outbreak on campus. By 1863, the Jefferson and Washington chapters merged, as most members had enlisted to fight in the American Civil War.

=== Kappa Phi Lambda ===
In 1862, the Kappa Phi Lambda fraternity was founded at Jefferson College. It dissolved in 1874. The two surviving fraternities are colloquially referred to as the Jefferson Duo.

=== Phi Delta Kappa/Phi Gamma Delta ===
In 1874, a fourth fraternity was founded at W&J, when the national Iota Alpha Kappa structure dissolved, allowing the W&J chapter to reconstitute itself as a new fraternity, Phi Delta Kappa. The new fraternity grew to several chapters before falling apart in 1880. In 1881, the W&J chapter joined Phi Gamma Delta, reclaiming the "Alpha" designation that had belonged to the founding chapter at Jefferson College.

=== Mid to Late 19th Century ===
Many of the surviving fraternities on campus were founded during the mid to late 19th century, including Beta Theta Pi at Jefferson College in 1842, Delta Tau Delta in 1861 at both Jefferson and Washington Colleges, Phi Kappa Sigma in 1854, Phi Delta Theta in 1875, and Alpha Tau Omega in 1882, which had been a chapter of Alpha Gamma before the national fraternity dissolved the previous year.

=== Other ===
A number of fraternities from that time period did not survive the union of the two colleges, including Sigma Chi, Delta Kappa Epsilon, and Delta Upsilon. The chapter of Theta Delta Chi was founded in 1858 and was dissolved in 1872. The W&J chapter of Sigma Phi Epsilon was founded in 1902 and dissolved in 1906.

=== Kappa Sigma/Lambda Chi Alpha/Zeta Beta Tau ===
In the early 2000s, two fraternities that were founded in the 19th century, Kappa Sigma and Lambda Chi Alpha, had their charters revoked by their national organizations after alcohol violations, and a third, Zeta Beta Tau dissolved due to a lack of membership.

Barron Patterson McCune was a member of Lambda Chi Alpha.

=== Sororities ===
Pi Beta Phi and Delta Gamma were formed during the 1970s, when women were first admitted to Washington & Jefferson College. Kappa Kappa Gamma was formed in 1984.
