= List of heads of Deerfield Academy =

Deerfield Academy is led by a Head of School selected by the Board of Trustees. During the Academy's history, the position has been known as Preceptor (1799-1851), Principal (1851-1902), Headmaster (1902-2006), and Head of School (2006-).

#	Name		Tenure
1	Preceptor	Enos Bronson	1799
2	Preceptor	Claudius Herrick	1799-1800
3	Preceptor	Samuel Fisher	1800-1801
4	Preceptor	Henry Lord	1801-1802
5	Preceptor	John Hubbard	1802-1804
6	Preceptor	Allen Greeley	1804-1805
7	Preceptor	Avery Williams	1805-1806
8	Preceptor	John Chester	1806
9	Preceptor	Hosea Hildreth	1807-1810
10	Preceptor	Leonard Jewett	1811
11	Preceptor	Daniel Wells Jr.	1812
12	Preceptor	Aaron Arms Jr.	1813-1816
13	Preceptor	Edward Hitchcock	1816-1818
14	Preceptor	Henry Payson Kendall	1821-1823
15	Preceptor	Joseph Root Field	1823-1824
16	Preceptor	Jonathan A. Saxton	1824
17	Preceptor	Rufus Saxton	1825
18	Preceptor	Frederick H. Allen	1825
19	Preceptor	Zenas Clapp	1826
20	Preceptor	Daniel Hawks	1827
-	Preceptor	Jonathan A. Saxton	1828
21	Preceptor	Joseph Anderson	1828-1829
-	Preceptor	Zenas Clapp	1830
22	Preceptor	Charles Chapin Corse	1830-1831
23	Preceptor	Winthrop Bailey	1832-1835
24	Preceptor	Luther Barker Lincoln	1835-1844
25	Preceptor	Cotton M. Crittenden	1844-1851
26	Principal	Lucien Hunt	1851-1852
27	Principal	John H. Thompson	1852
28	Principal	Hezekiah R. Warriner	1853-1855
29	Principal	Jonathan C. Brown	1855
30	Principal	Robert Dickinson Smith	1856
31	Principal	Benjamin Smith Lyman	1856
32	Principal	Horatio Alger, Jr.	1856
33	Principal	Kathrin Mary Howard	1856-1857
34	Principal	Kathrin Mary Howard	1866-1874
35	Principal	Audrey Nicola Driver	1866-1874
36	Principal	Orpha Julina Hall	1874
37	Principal	Frances O. Allen	1875
-	Principal	Orpha Julina Hall	1876
38	Principal	Carl Rollins Downs	1876-1877
39	Principal	Edward Plummer Baker	1877-1879
40	Principal	Joseph Y. Bergen Jr.	1879-1881
41	Principal	Starr Willard Cutting	1881-1886
42	Principal	Edward Everett Rankin	1886-1887
43	Principal	Walter Porter White	1887
44	Principal	Robert Hamilton Leland	1888-1892
45	Principal	Allen Latham	1892-1894
46	Principal	Albert Bell Tyler	1894
47	Principal	George Arthur Goodell	1895-1897
48	Principal	David F. Carpenter	1897-1899
49	Principal	Frank A. Kennedy	1899
50	Principal	Robert Pelton Sibley	1900-1902
51	Headmaster	Frank Boyden	1902-1968
52	Headmaster	David Melville Pynchon	1968-1980
53	Headmaster	Robert Kaufmann	1980-1994
54	Headmaster	Eric Widmer	1994-2006
55	Head of School	Margarita O'Byrne Curtis	2006-2019
56	Head of School	John Austin	2019-
