= Todd Gray =

Todd Gray may refer to:

- Todd Gray (chef), executive chef and co-owner of Equinox, a restaurant in Washington, D.C.
- Todd Gray (artist) (born 1954), contemporary artist
- Todd Gray (historian), historian of the county of Devon, England
