= Eric Shusta =

American academic

- Born: 1972 (age 53–54)

Academic background
- Education: BS University of Wisconsin-Madison, MS & PhD, Chemical Engineering, University of Illinois Urbana-Champaign
- Website: https://ericshusta.che.wisc.edu/

Eric Shusta is the Howard Curler Distinguished Professor of Chemical and Biological Engineering at the University of Wisconsin–Madison. He served as the R. Byron Bird Department Chair from the summer of 2021 to the spring of 2024.

== Early life and education ==
Shusta was born and raised in West Allis, Wisconsin. He attended the University of Wisconsin-Madison and received his bachelor's in chemical engineering in 1999. He received his master's in 1998 and his doctorate in 1999, both at the University of Illinois Urbana-Champaign, where he worked with Professor K. Dane Wittrup. Afterwards, he worked with the late professor W.M. Pardridge at the UCLA Medical School in the endocrinology department, for which he received a National Institutes of Health training fellowship.

== Career ==
Shusta joined the faculty at the Department of Chemical and Biological Engineering at the University of Wisconsin-Madison in 2001 and received the Camille and Henry Dreyfus New Faculty Award. In 2003, he received a National Science Foundation CAREER Award. He was promoted to associate professor in 2007 and became a full professor in 2012.

As a faculty member at UW-Madison, he received various awards including the American Chemical Society BIOT Division's Young Investigator Award in 2013, the Vilas Associates Award in 2014, and the Vilas Mid-Career Award and and the Howard Curler Distinguished Professorship in 2015.

He was inducted into the American Institute for Medical and Biological Engineering as a fellow in 2014 for developing technology to accelerate the search for pharmaceuticals that can permeate the blood-brain barrier.

In 2018, he received the Vilas Distinguished Achievement Professorship, which recognizes distinguished scholarship and standout efforts in teaching and in service. It also provides five years of flexible funding. Recently, Shusta received the 2025-26 Kellet Mid-Career Award, which recognizes researchers who have made key contributions to their field.

During his tenure at UW–Madison, Eric's researched the blood-brain barrier (BBB), which currently prevents over 98% of small-molecule pharmaceuticals and biopharmaceuticals from reaching the brain for neurological disease treatment. His group's research focuses on developing non-invasive delivery methods by leveraging molecular engineering to exploit the BBB's natural transport mechanisms. This involves discovering novel endogenous transport systems and designing specific antibodies that can be linked to various drug payloads (small molecules, biopharmaceuticals, or DNA therapeutics) to shuttle them into the brain. Concurrently, Shusta and his research group are working to create advanced in vitro BBB models using genomics, proteomics, and patient-derived pluripotent stem cells to accurately mimic the barrier's in vivo qualities, enabling high-throughput screening of drug candidates during testing and studying the neurovascular unit.
