= MABS =

MABS may refer to:

- Mid-Atlantic Boarding School Group (MABS)
- Acrylonitrile butadiene styrene#Transparent ABS (MABS)
