= Jean Rhodes =

American psychologist and author

Jean E. Rhodes (born c. 1961) is an American psychologist and author. She is the Frank L. Boyden Professor of Psychology at the University of Massachusetts, Boston. She is the director of the Center for Evidence-Based Mentoring at the University of Massachusetts, Boston.

== Career ==
Rhodes graduated Phi Beta Kappa from the University of Vermont in 1983. She went on to earn her Ph.D. in clinical psychology with distinction from DePaul University and completed her clinical internship in 1988 and a postdoctoral clinical position in 1989 at the University of Chicago.

Rhodes was hired as an assistant of psychology at the University of Illinois Urbana-Champaign in 1989, where she was promoted to associate professor with tenure in 1995.

Rhodes currently serves as the Frank L. Boyden Professor of Psychology in the clinical psychology division at the University of Massachusetts, Boston. Throughout her career, Rhodes has published four books and over 200 chapters and articles. Rhodes specializes in the study of youth mentoring and is noted for her theories of mentoring relationship process and formal mentoring relationships. Rhodes is co-Founder of MentorPRO, a technology platform for improving the effectiveness of mentoring relationships.

== Awards and recognition ==
Rhodes is the recipient of the 2024 Urie Bronfenbrenner Award for Lifetime Contribution to Developmental Psychology in the Service of Science and Society from Division 7 of the American Psychological Association (2024). Her book, Older and wiser: New Ideas for youth mentoring in the 21st Century received the Eleanor Maccoby Award from Division 7 (2023). Rhodes is also the recipient of the 2024 Distinguished Contribution to Research and Theory Award from the American Psychological Association's Society for Research and Community Action (Division 27). Rhodes is a fellow of the American Psychological Association and the Society for Research and Community Action. Previously, she was a member of two MacArthur Foundation research networks, a Robert Wood Johnson health policy fellow, and both a faculty scholar and a distinguished fellow of the William T. Grant Foundation. At the University of Massachusetts, Rhodes has received the Commonwealth Citation for Outstanding Performance, the Distinguished Academic Leadership and Outstanding Service to the Students Award, and the Chancellor's Distinguished Scholar Award.

== Personal ==
Rhodes grew up in Allendale, New Jersey, and currently lives in Boston, Massachusetts. She has been married to the academic K. Dane Wittrup since 1990 and they have three children.
