= Robert Sibley (disambiguation) =

Robert Sibley (1881–1958) was an American professor.

Robert Sibley may also refer to:

- Robert Pelton Sibley (1879–1957), American academic and headmaster
- Robert Sibley (basketball) (born 1966), Australian basketball player
