= Episcopal High School (Alexandria, Virginia) =

Prep school in Alexandria, Virginia, US

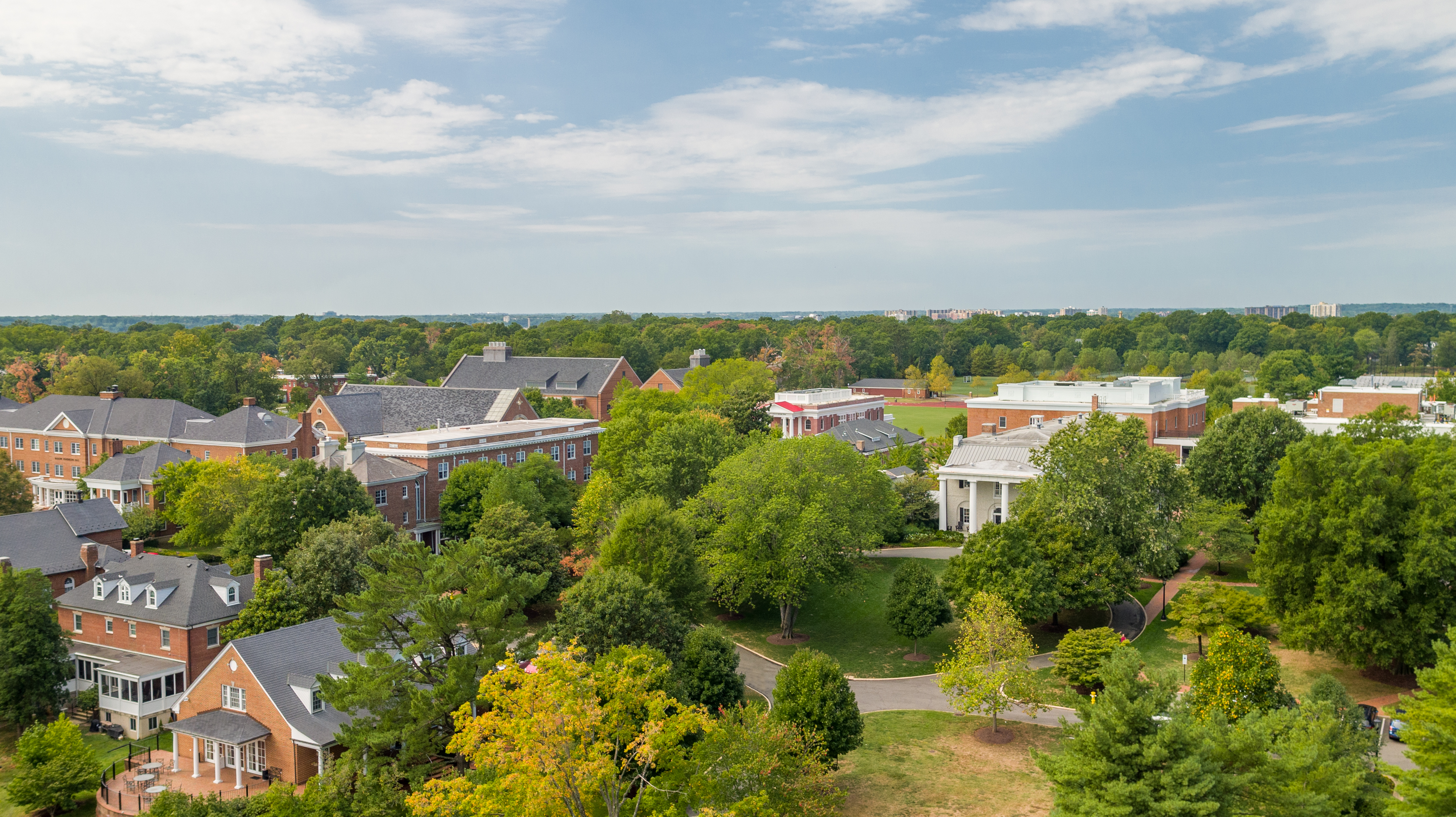

Location
- 1200 North Quaker Lane; Alexandria, Virginia 22302; United States; 38°49′28.5″N 77°5′39.9″W

Information
- Other name: Protestant Episcopal High School in Virginia; The High School
- Type: Independent; boarding; college preparatory
- Motto: Fortiter, fideliter, feliciter (Bravely, Faithfully, Happily)
- Religious affiliation: Episcopal Church
- Established: 1839; 187 years ago
- NCES School ID: 01433226
- Head of school: Charley Stillwell
- Faculty: 96
- Grades: 9–12
- Gender: Co-educational
- Enrollment: 440
- Student to teacher ratio: 4.6:1
- Campus size: 130 acres (53 ha)
- Colors: Maroon and Black
- Athletics conference: IAC (boys); ISL (girls)
- Sports: 19
- Team name: Maroon
- Rival: Woodberry Forest School
- Accreditation: VAIS; SACS
- Newspaper: The Chronicle
- Yearbook: Whispers
- Endowment: $424 million (2026)
- Tuition: $77,700 (2026–27)
- Affiliations: NAIS; NAES; MABS; TABS
- Alumni: Notable alumni
- Website: episcopalhighschool.org

Episcopal High School (Episcopal or EHS) is a boarding school in Alexandria, Virginia. Established in 1839 by the Episcopal Diocese of Virginia, it was the first high school in Virginia. Episcopal is a 100-percent boarding school located approximately seven miles from Washington, D.C. Originally an all-boys school, Episcopal transitioned to coeducation in 1991.

The 130-acre (53-hectare) campus houses 440 students from 27 countries, 32 states, and the District of Columbia. The school closed temporarily during the American Civil War, and was used by the Union Army as a military hospital. Today, the hilltop campus has seven academic buildings, ten dormitories, performing arts buildings, faculty housing and athletic facilities, as well as a forested area. As of June 2026, the school has an endowment of $424 million.

Episcopal emphasizes experiential and co-curricular learning through the Washington Program, using the school's proximity to Washington, D.C., to offer more than 650 educational experiences during flex blocks each year. The McCain–Ravenel Center for Intellectual and Moral Courage (MRC) focuses on global programs, leadership, service learning, visiting speakers, and senior externships.

Episcopal competes against Woodberry Forest School in the longest-running consecutive high school football rivalry in the South, played annually since 1901. Episcopal's athletics facilities have frequently been used by international soccer teams, most recently during the 2026 FIFA World Cup. It is a founding member of the Mid-Atlantic Boarding School Group. Its notable alumni include U.S. senators and representatives, governors, cabinet officials, a former head of state, business executives, physicians, writers, and professional athletes.

== History ==
=== Origins ===
Episcopal High School was founded in 1839 as the first high school in Virginia by the Episcopal Diocese of Virginia. The neighboring Virginia Theological Seminary purchased 80 acres (32 hectares) of land in the Seminary Hill neighborhood of Alexandria for $5000.

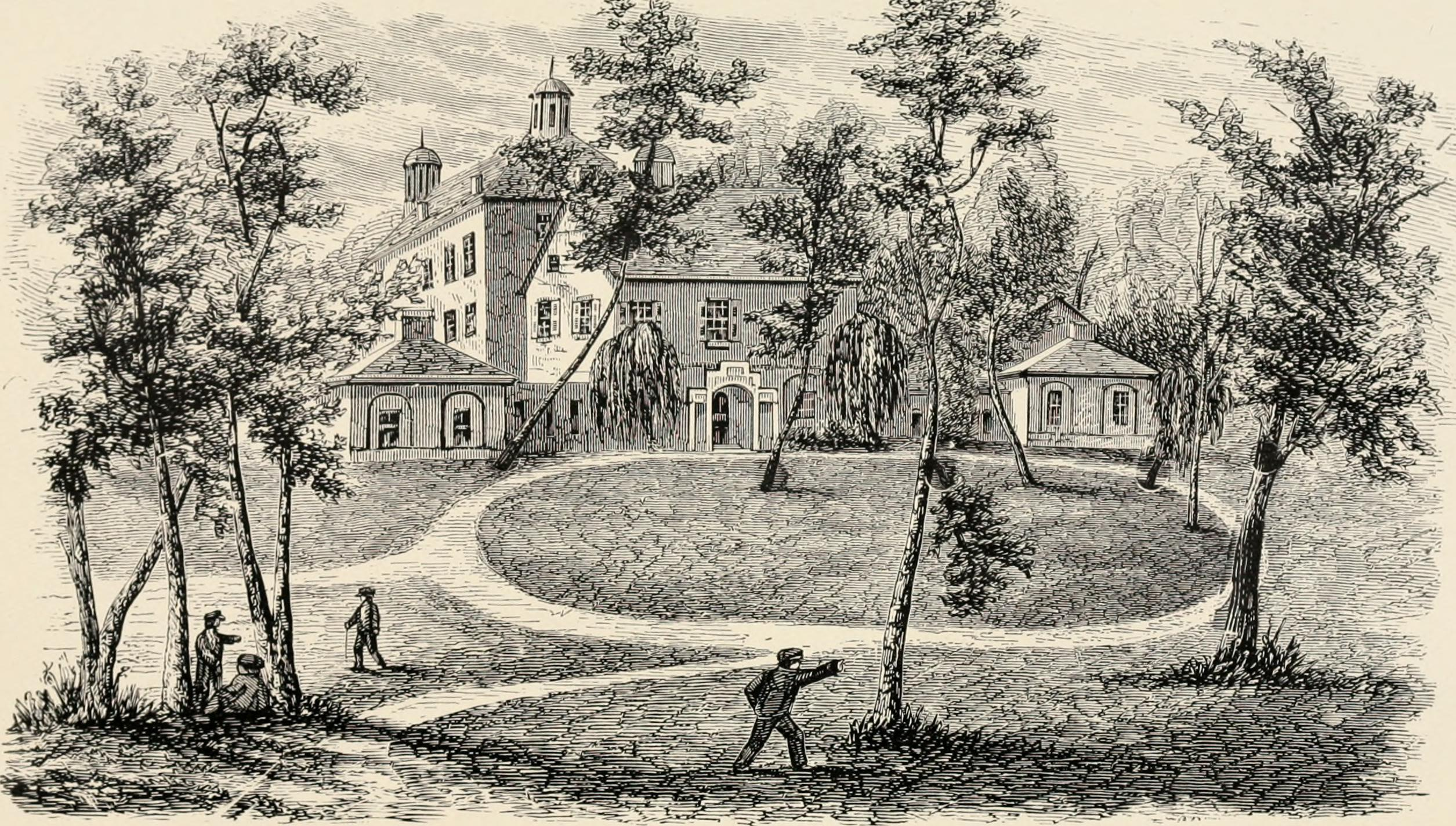
An early Episcopal school building (c. 1857).

The Rev. William N. Pendleton was appointed the first principal and the boarding facility opened on October 15 of that year. Pendleton, along with three assistant heads, taught 35 boys in the first year. In 1840, Episcopal's student body tripled in size to accommodate more than 100 boys.

The school was interchangeably known as the Howard School, from its location at the site of an earlier school that ran from 1831 until 1834. Episcopal became affectionately known throughout the South as "The High School" as it was the only high school around for another 30 years. The central administration building, Hoxton House (first known as Mt. Washington) dates to around 1805 and was built by Martha Washington's eldest granddaughter, Elizabeth Parke Custis Law. The Reade-Latham House, right next to the Hoxton House, was built in 1832.

Episcopal instituted an Honor Code by 1857, making it one of the earlier secondary schools in the United States to adopt such a system. A committee of students and faculty members administers the code and handles violations.

=== Civil War and late 19th century ===
Episcopal continued to grow until the Civil War, when it closed immediately after Union Army forces occupied Alexandria in 1861. For the next five years, school buildings were used as part of a Union military hospital complex. Poet Walt Whitman served as a nurse there. The school reopened in 1866 under Principal William Fowler Gardner.

Some 500 students and alumni served in the war, many for the Confederacy; 14 alumni served the Union. The school's first principal, Rev. William N. Pendleton, became a Confederate brigadier general. Episcopal was among the Southern denominational schools that retained a strong Southern establishment identity into the twentieth century. Pendleton Hall contains a plaque memorializing the 68 students and alumni who died in the war.

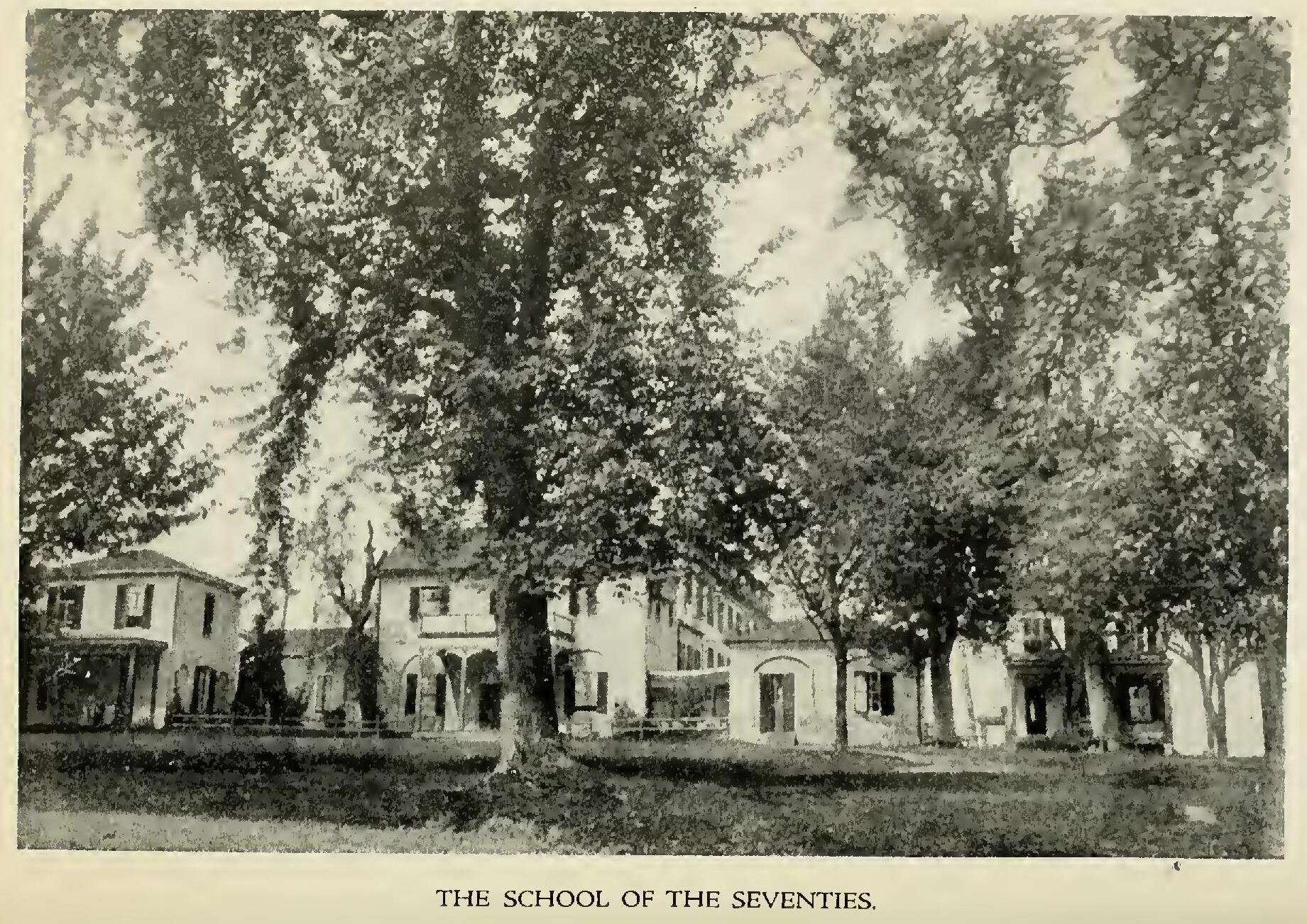
Episcopal's campus in the 1870s.

Under the direction of Launcelot Minor Blackford (first layman appointed as a principal, 1870–1913), the school initiated a modern academic curriculum and pioneered interscholastic team sports in the South, including football, baseball, and track. Episcopal played its first official football game in 1881, beating "Kendall" by a score of 1/4–0.

In 1888, Episcopal adopted black and blue as school colors, but after losing a few games and hearing an opponent claim that "EHS had been beaten black and blue", the school changed colors to maroon and black.

Beginning in the 1890s, Episcopal undertook a building program that helped shape the present-day campus. In 1891, Baltimore-based architect James Crawford Neilson was commissioned to design Liggett Hall and other campus improvements.

In 1892, Episcopal enrolled its first international students from China. Among them was Yan Huiqing, who in the 1920s became Premier and later President of the Republic of China.

=== 20th century ===
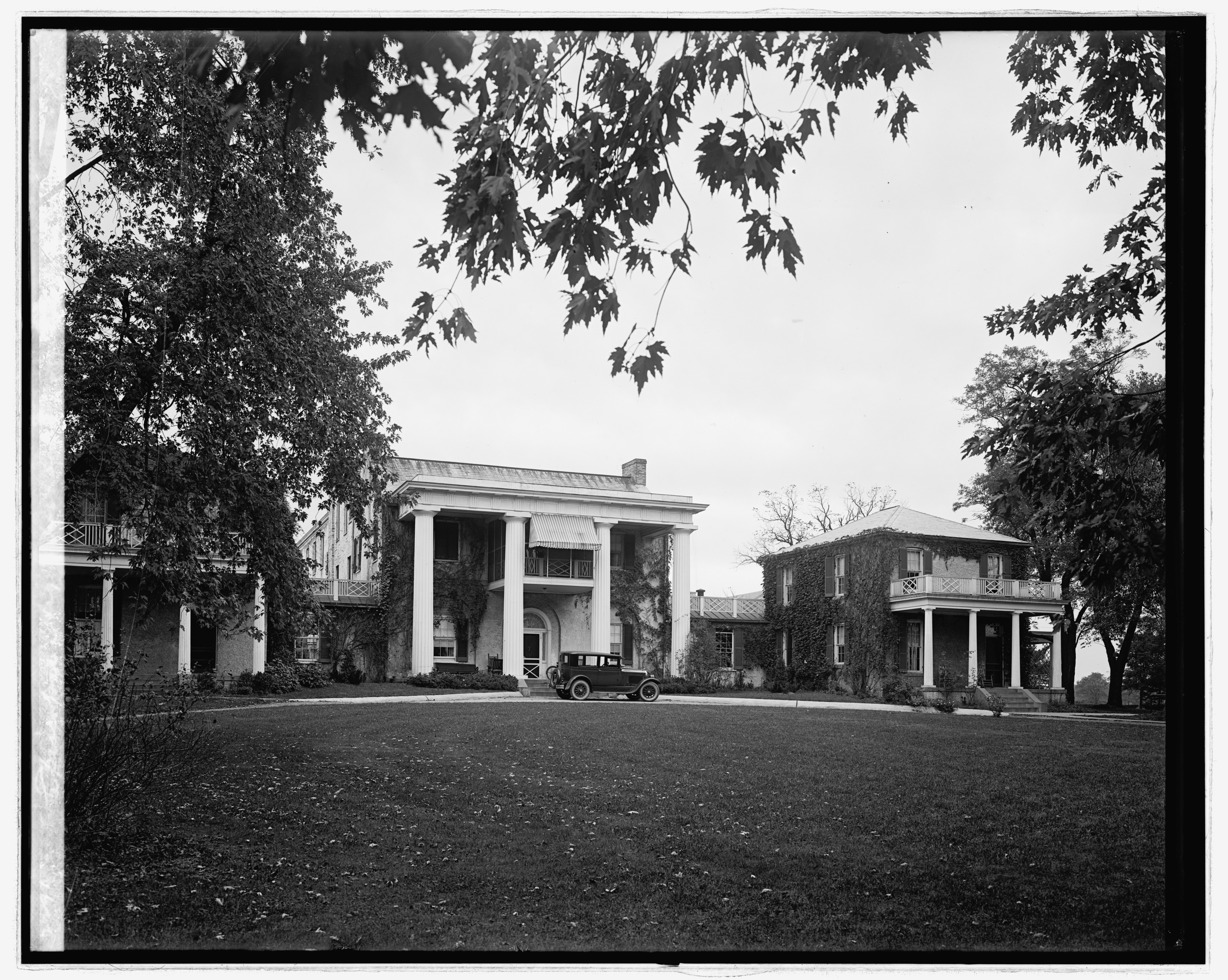
Hoxton House in 1918.

The school's physical expansion continued in the early twentieth century. In the 1910s, Episcopal commissioned architect Frederick H. Brooke to renovate the main hall and design additional buildings.

During World War I, 461 Episcopal alumni served in the war. Among them were Newton D. Baker, the United States Secretary of War, and Quentin Roosevelt, who was killed in action in 1918. In 1920, the school dedicated a memorial to 22 alumni who died in the war.

Prior to the opening of the Joseph Bryan library in 1927, the students had access to magazines and book collections through the various literary societies on campus, which included the Pithonian (1839–1861), the Fairfax (1870), the Blackford (1874), and the Wilmer (1911).

At the time of its centennial in 1938, Time profiled Episcopal as a long-established Southern preparatory school, describing its traditions, curriculum, athletics, and prominent alumni.

In his 1958 book Philadelphia Gentlemen, sociologist E. Digby Baltzell included Episcopal among a core group of sixteen socially elite Eastern boarding schools. Later scholars referred to the schools on Baltzell's list as the "Select 16". A 2009 scholarly study by Rubén A. Gaztambide-Fernández included Episcopal among a group of 28 elite boarding schools.

Beginning in the 1960s, Episcopal undertook a modernization of its campus, adding new academic and athletic facilities and improving faculty housing.

==== Integration and co-education ====
In September 1968, Episcopal began admitting African-American students under the presidency of Archibald R. Hoxton Jr. The school's first two African-American students, Regi Burns '72 and Sam Paschall '72, enrolled with support from the Stouffer Foundation, which recruited and placed African-American students at preparatory schools across the South. Their enrollment followed a 1965 board resolution stating: "Any and all applicants for admission shall be considered on an equal basis after giving due regard to their scholastic preparedness and their ability and desire to meet the standards of the school."

By its 150th anniversary in 1989, Episcopal had undergone substantial institutional changes. That year, students came from about 25 states and five foreign countries, and minority students constituted 17 percent of enrollment.

In 1991, Episcopal began a transition to coeducation by enrolling its first 48 girls, a group now referred to as "The First 48". The decision to admit girls for the first time in its 152-year history was based on philosophical reasoning as well as the economic need to increase enrollment. The decision came during what Education Week described as a second wave of coeducation among leading boys' boarding schools. The first coeducational class graduated in 1993.

=== More recent history ===
During the 2020 COVID-19 pandemic, Episcopal opted not to receive loans under the Paycheck Protection Program, stating that it "should not seek this kind of support when others need it more."

== Organization and administration ==
From the beginning, Episcopal and the neighboring Virginia Theological Seminary were governed by the same board of trustees, appointed by the Diocese. The organizations were permitted to be incorporated in 1854 as the "Protestant Episcopal Theological Seminary and High School in Virginia." In 1923, the school separated its governance from the diocese and has been overseen by an independent board of trustees since then.

Episcopal is a founding member of the Mid-Atlantic Boarding School Group (MABS).

== Finances ==
=== Tuition and financial aid ===
The comprehensive fee for the 2026–27 school year is $77,700 and includes tuition, room and board, basic health-center expenses, and most school-sponsored academic, athletic, and recreational activities. Approximately 35% of students receive financial assistance; Episcopal awards about $8.3 million in aid annually, with an average need-based grant of $56,143. The school has more than 100 endowed scholarship funds.

=== Endowment ===
As of June 30, 2026, Episcopal had an endowment of $424 million. Episcopal is one of the beneficiaries of a restricted fund established under the will of Lettie Pate Whitehead Evans. The fund, administered by the independent Lettie Pate Evans Foundation, distributes five percent of its net income to Episcopal each year in perpetuity.

For the fiscal year ending in 2025, Episcopal reported total assets of $656.0 million and net assets of $578.2 million in its Internal Revenue Service filing. Episcopal also reported $43.6 million in program service expenses and $8.8 million in grants (primarily student financial aid).

In 2025, Episcopal completed Courage: The Campaign for Episcopal, a seven-year fundraising campaign launched in 2018 that raised $157 million.

== Campus ==
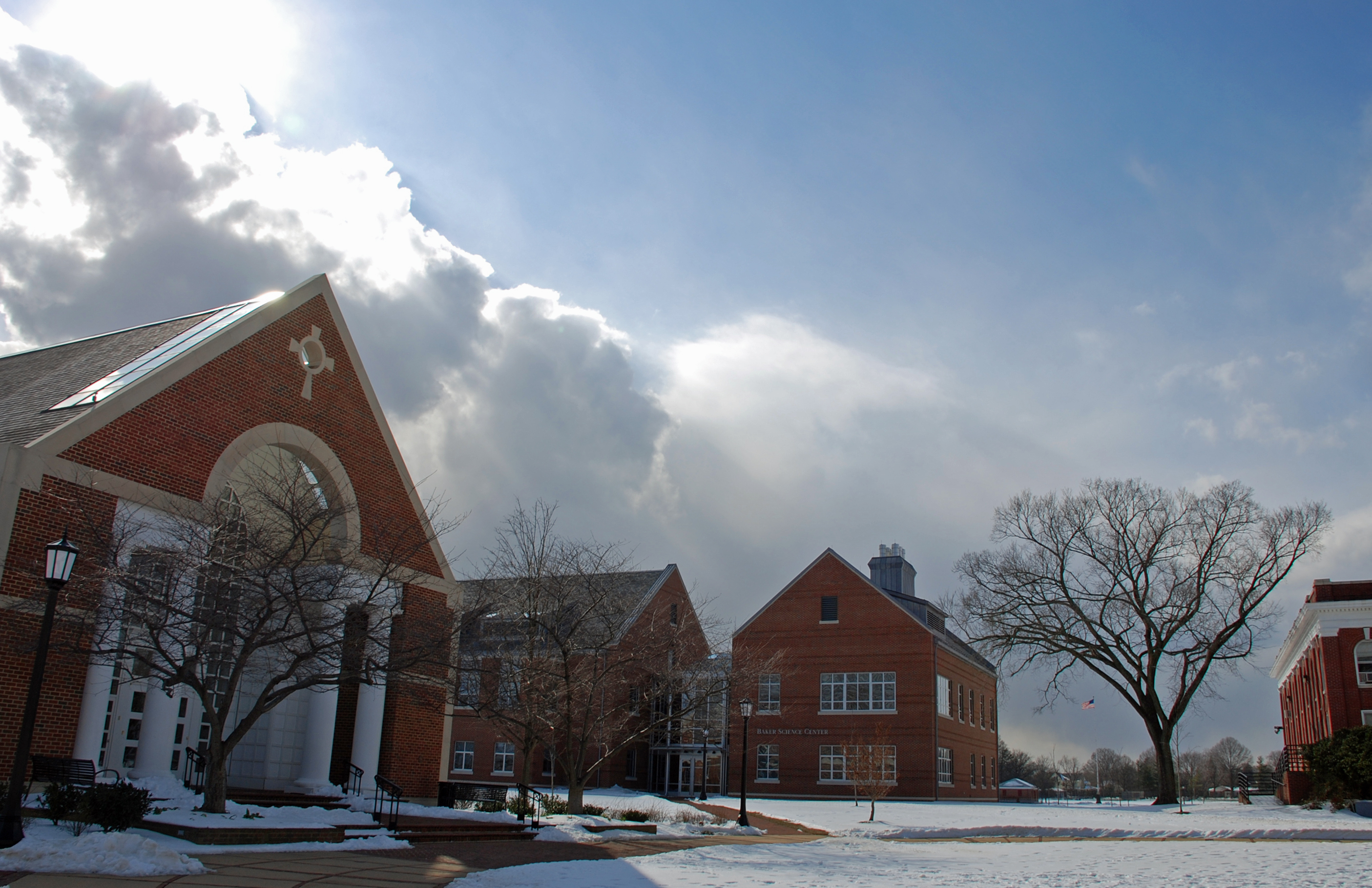
Callaway Chapel and the Baker Science Center, Episcopal High School Virginia

Episcopal occupies a 130-acre (53 ha) hilltop campus in the Seminary Hill neighborhood of Alexandria with academic buildings, ten dormitories, performing arts facilities, faculty housing, athletic facilities and fields. About 41 acres comprise a wooded area known as Laird Acres.

Beginning in the late 1990s, Episcopal undertook a major campus redevelopment program that included both renovations and new construction. This $60 million physical plant redevelopment was managed by Trammell Crow Company. Architect Allan Greenberg was commissioned to renovate Penick Hall. Several campus facilities are named in memory of Fred Hummel Jr., an alumnus and fighter pilot killed in a jet crash at Nellis Air Force Base, including the Hummel Learning Center, Hummel Bowl, and Hummel Dormitory.

In 2018, Episcopal began a new campus master plan with DLR Group focused on student housing, wellness, and athletics. The plan led to construction of the deButts Health and Wellness Center, North and West dormitories, and a new residential quad. This project replaced the Hoxton Field and the outdated running track with a new regulation 400-meter outdoor track with a bermuda grass soccer pitch near the Coxe Field.

=== Academic facilities ===
- Baker Science Center (opened 2005) is a 34,000-square-foot (3,200 m^{2}) science building designed by Graham Gund Architects. The $11 million, LEED-certified facility includes a two-story glass rotunda and received the Northern Virginia NAIOP Best Institutional Facility Award.
- Ainslie Arts Center (opened 2003) is a 42,000-square-foot (3,900 m^{2}) performing arts facility containing the 540-seat William N. Pendleton auditorium, a 100-seat black box theater, and recording, rehearsal, dance, photography, and ceramics spaces. The $7.5 million project renovated and expanded the existing auditorium complex. The center is named for former headmaster Lee Sanford Ainslie '56.

=== Libraries ===
- David H. March Library (opened 1990) is the school's main library and is located in the Hummel Learning Center.
- Joseph Bryan Library (opened 1927, renovated 2007) was Episcopal's first purpose-built library. It was constructed with a $35,000 gift from John Stewart Bryan in memory of his father, Joseph Bryan. Designed during the early years of the Colonial Williamsburg restoration, the building reflects the Georgian Revival style. It now houses the school archives and functions as a small meeting space.

=== Student life facilities ===
- Callaway Chapel (opened 1990) is a 580-seat chapel designed by Walton Madden Cooper (WMCRP). Its postmodern design incorporates a north-facing Palladian facade, including a curved entrance, semicircular wooden trusses, and a large stained-glass oculus behind the altar.
- deButts Health and Wellness Center (opened 2023) is a two-story, 17,000-square-foot (1,600 m^{2}) facility containing clinical spaces, counseling offices, a health classroom, and a yoga studio. The building also houses the Jesse W. Couch Counseling Center.
- Stewart Student Center, commonly known as Stew, occupies the former Stewart Gymnasium. The building opened in 1913 and replaced an earlier gymnasium dating to 1877; it was renovated and converted into a student center in 2014 in a $9.5 million project by Voith & Mactavish Architects.
- Laird Dining Hall is Episcopal's primary dining facility.

=== Dormitories ===
Episcopal has ten student dormitories. Several reflect different phases of the school's residential expansion: Evans Dormitory, opened in 1992, was Episcopal's first dormitory built for girls and was named for benefactor Lettie Pate Whitehead Evans; Hummel and Maguire dormitories opened in 1995 as part of a freshman residential complex; Robertson Hall houses the Anderson and Harrison dorms for the upperclassmen; and Hoxton Dormitory opened in 2003 following renovations to Dalrymple and Berkeley dormitories.

North and West dormitories opened in 2023 as part of a three-building, 72,700-square-foot (6,750 m^{2}) project that also included the deButts Health and Wellness Center. The $45 million project was intended to reduce residential density without increasing enrollment; the dormitories are LEED Silver certified and use geothermal systems.

=== Athletic facilities ===
Episcopal athletics department is located in the Hershey Athletic Center. Its principal athletic facilities include the Hummel Bowl, Centennial Gym, Goodman Squash Center, Flippin Field House, and several outdoor playing fields. The campus includes synthetic- and natural-turf fields, tennis courts, basketball courts, an indoor track, squash courts, baseball and softball facilities, and a recreational outdoor swimming pool.

Episcopal's training facilities have been described as among the finest in the region, with its soccer facilities described as being of a high professional standard. In 2025, the school installed 40-to-100-foot-tall lights at several athletic fields, allowing for evening practices in the summer months.

- Bocock Wrestling Cage is a dedicated venue for the wrestling program.
- Centennial Gym opened in 1937 in advance of the school's centennial and was renovated in 2010. It offers multiple courts for basketball and volleyball.
- The Class of 1976 Golf Center opened in 2024 with four practice bays equipped with TrackMan simulators and an indoor putting green.

==== Use by professional and national teams ====
Episcopal has periodically hosted professional and national soccer teams for training. During the 2026 FIFA World Cup, Episcopal was named FIFA World Cup training site in 2025 and served as the base camp for the Croatia national football team. The Wall Street Journal quipped the Croatian team would recover between matches within the "preppy boarding-school confines... players may enjoy a well-stocked library, relax in a bespoke ceramics studio, or choose to fill out an Ivy League application." In July 2025, Episcopal served as a base camp for the Al Ain FC during the 2025 FIFA Club World Cup.

The United States women's national soccer team used the athletic facilities at Episcopal to train before the 2016 and 2024 Summer Olympics. Other teams that have used the school's facilities include the Guatemala national football team, Chelsea F.C. Women, the Alexandria Reds (NPSL), and the Washington Spirit (NWSL).

== Academics ==
In 2026, Episcopal had 96 full-time faculty members, a student–faculty ratio of 4.6:1, and an average class size of 11. About 90% of faculty members lived on campus and 80% held advanced degrees.

=== Curriculum ===
Episcopal offers more than 150 courses, including approximately 75 honors and advanced-level courses. The school does not offer Advanced Placement courses, although students enrolled in advanced courses may take AP examinations.

The curriculum is organized across eight academic departments and includes instruction in eight foreign languages. Episcopal also partners with the Global Online Academy, a nonprofit consortium through which upperclassmen may take specialized electives for academic credit.

=== McCain-Ravenel Center ===
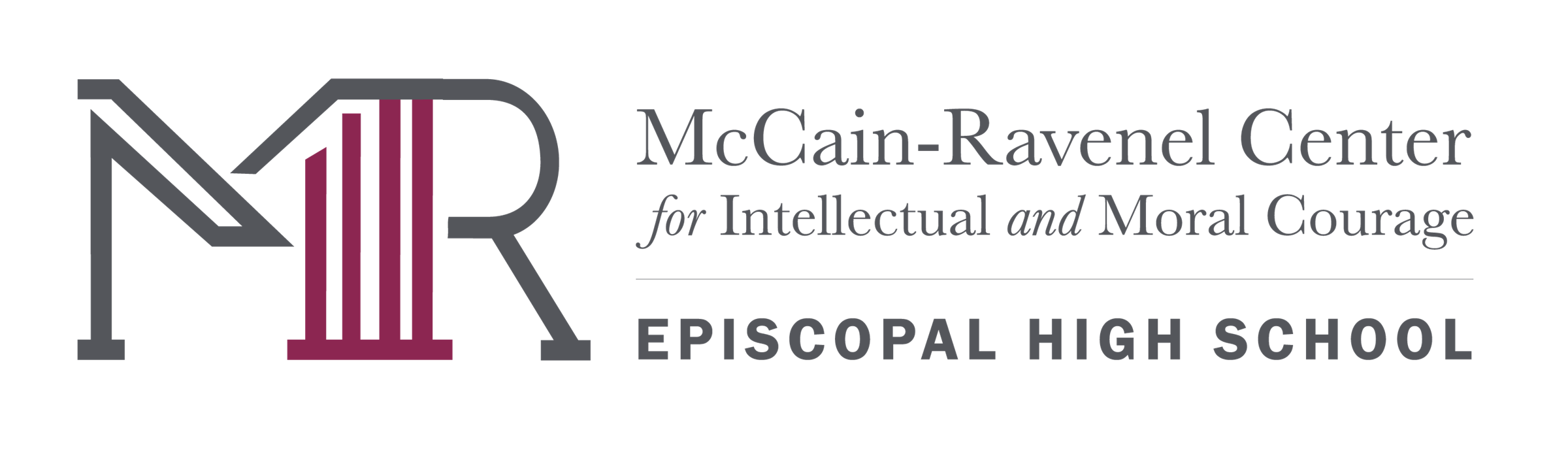
McCain-Ravenel Center at EHS.

The McCain–Ravenel Center for Intellectual and Moral Courage (MRC) serves as the hub for experiential learning, externships, global programs, leadership, and service-learning. Established in 2018, the center is named for senator John McCain and his mentor at EHS, William Bee Ravenel III. MRC helps connect students with the real-world experiences/opportunities in Washington D.C. and coordinates visiting speakers. It also arranges the month-long senior externships with 85+ metro area partners.

=== The Washington Program ===
As part of the Washington Program, Episcopal incorporates 2.5-hour midday flex blocks into its schedule for co-curricular class excursions throughout the Washington metropolitan area, with optional evening flex blocks. With 100% of teachers conducting a flex block, EHS reports more than 650 Washington experiences each year.

== Enrollment and student body ==
As of 2025, Episcopal has an enrollment of 440 students, half of whom are girls. In the 2025–26 school year, Episcopal reported that 40% of its students identified as people of color. The student body represented 27 countries, 32 states, the District of Columbia. For the 2026 admissions cycle, independent educational aggregators reported Episcopal's acceptance rate to be between 29% and 35%.

== Student life ==
All students live on campus in one of ten dormitories, five for boys and five for girls. Residence halls include resident faculty, associate faculty members, and student prefects and proctors. The fully residential model also includes students from the Washington metropolitan area, with some local families choosing Episcopal specifically for the boarding experience despite living near the school.

The Laird dining hall serves as the main dining hall at Episcopal and students may also eat at the Stewart student center.

The school hosts over 90 student clubs and leadership organizations.

=== Publications ===
The Chronicle is the school's monthly newspaper, published since 1888. In the beginning, the students offset the publishing costs by charging for advertisements, but the school assumed those costs in the 1970s.

The school yearbook, Whispers, has been published annually since 1903; earlier EHS yearbooks were published irregularly beginning in 1891.

The Daemon is a student-run literary and arts magazine that has been published since 1957.

=== Arts programs ===
Episcopal offers courses in visual and performing arts, including music, theater, dance, photography, ceramics, and studio art. Arts instruction is centered in the Ainslie Arts Center, which hosts exhibitions, concerts, and workshops.

The Ainslie Arts Center also houses the Angie Newman Johnson Gallery, established in 2002, which presents annual exhibitions by prominent artists.

The National Chamber Players have been the resident chamber ensemble at Episcopal since 2004. Composed of members of the National Symphony Orchestra and other professional musicians, the ensemble performs four concerts annually in Pendleton Hall at the Ainslie Arts Center.

=== Chapel and spiritual life ===
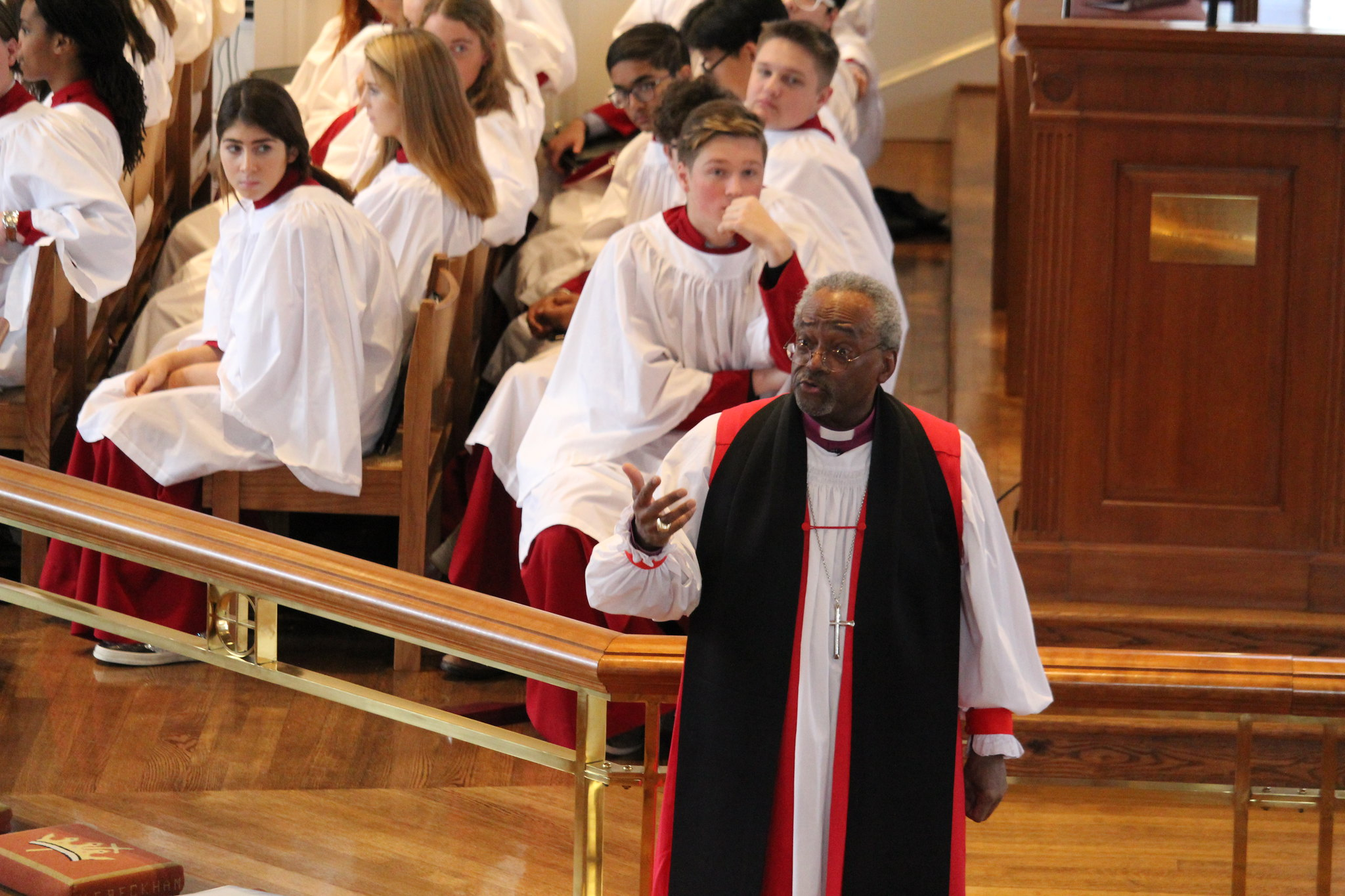
The Most Rev. Michael Curry speaking at Episcopal in 2019.

Episcopal is affiliated with the Episcopal Church, and students attend chapel three times each week. The 580-seat Callaway Chapel, built in 1990, serves as the school's principal worship space. The chapel is named for Patrick Henry Callaway, who served on the Episcopal faculty for 70 years, from 1916 until 1986.

Students also attend a monthly evening Vespers service, while Sunday worship is voluntary. Students come from a variety of religious backgrounds, and the school facilitates attendance at off-campus houses of worship for students of other faiths. The Theology department supports chapel services.

Notable figures who have spoken at Episcopal chapel include Archbishop Desmond Tutu, the Most Rev. Michael Curry, Katharine Hayhoe, and Bishop Rob Wright.

== Athletics ==
Episcopal fields 52 boys' and girls' interscholastic teams in 19 sports: baseball, basketball, climbing, crew, cross country, field hockey, football, golf, lacrosse, soccer, softball, squash, swimming, tennis, indoor track and field and outdoor track and field, ultimate frisbee, volleyball, and wrestling. Non-interscholastic programs, such as sports media, dance, cross training, and strength training, are also available. All students participate in the school's afternoon program and must earn athletic credits as part of the graduation requirements. There are varsity, junior varsity, and, for some sports, junior-level teams.

The Seminary Hill Cup (SHC), established in 2008, is an annual girls' athletics competition between Episcopal and St. Stephen's & St. Agnes School. This rivalry dates to 1991, when St. Agnes merged with St. Stephen's to become a coeducational school and Episcopal admitted its first female students.

The Hershey Athletic Center houses the Goodwin Hall of Fame.

Since 2013, 272 Episcopal graduates have gone on to compete in NCAA athletics.

=== Conference affiliation ===
Episcopal's boys' teams compete in the Interstate Athletic Conference (IAC), while its girls' teams compete in the Independent School League (ISL). Since 1979, the boys' teams have won 48 IAC championships, and since 1993, the girls' teams have won 41 ISL championships. Episcopal has also won 30 Virginia Independent School state championships since 1930.

=== Football ===
Episcopal competes against Woodberry Forest School in the oldest consecutive high school football rivalry in the South and one of the oldest in the United States. First played in 1901, the annual contest is known by both schools simply as "The Game". The game alternates annually between the two campuses and serves as the homecoming game for both schools. Episcopal is scheduled to host the 125th Game on November 14, 2026.

Episcopal won consecutive IAC football championships in 2015 and 2016; the 2016 team was ranked in the Washington Post Top 10, its first appearance there in more than 25 years.

=== Soccer ===
The boys' soccer team won consecutive Virginia Independent Schools Division I championships in 2008 and 2009. The 2008 team defeated Norfolk Academy 4–0 in the state final to complete a 23–0 season and finished ranked No. 11 nationally by NSCAA. The 2009 team remained undefeated, won the IAC championship and was ranked No. 3 in the national rankings by ESPN.

== Notable alumni ==
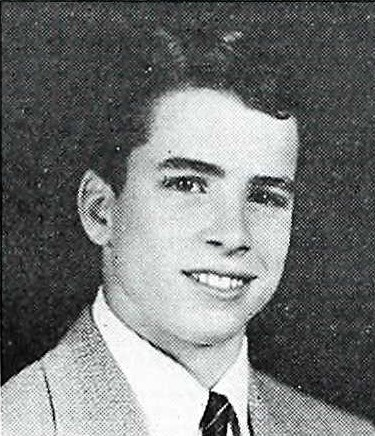
John McCain at Episcopal, 1953

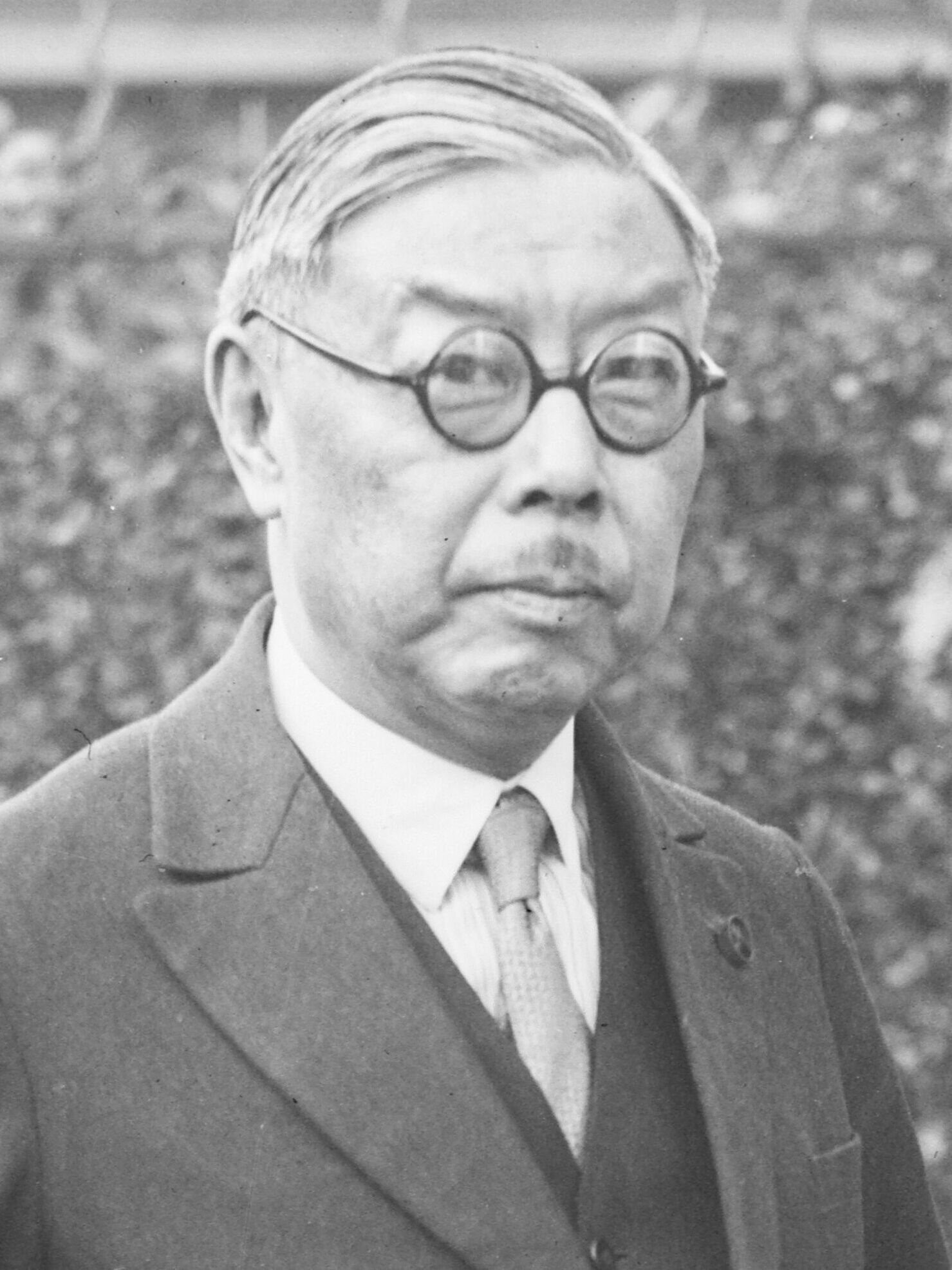
Yan Huiqing, Premier and later President of the Republic of China in the 1920s

- Stephen Ailes '29, U.S. Secretary of the Army
- Lee Ainslie '82, hedge fund manager
- Bill Backer '44, advertising executive
- Louis Bacon, hedge fund manager
- Dominique Badji, professional soccer player
- Newton D. Baker, U.S. Secretary of War, Founder of Baker Hostetler
- Cass Ballenger, Republican congressman from North Carolina
- Erek Barron, U.S. Attorney for the District of Maryland
- Alfred Berkeley '62, Former president of Nasdaq
- Langhorne Bond '55, administrator of the FAA
- T. Berry Brazelton, pediatrician and developer of the Brazelton Neonatal Behavioral Assessment Scale
- Bo Callaway, U.S. representative and Secretary of the Army
- Gaston Caperton '59, former governor of West Virginia and president of the College Board
- Johnson N. Camden Jr., U.S. senator from Kentucky
- Danny Coale, professional football player
- Virginius Dabney, journalist and Pulitzer Prize winner
- Paul DePodesta, baseball executive
- Phillips Lee Goldsborough I, governor of Maryland and U.S. senator
- Arthur Pue Gorman Jr., Maryland state senator
- Todd Gray, chef and restaurateur
- John Campbell Greenway, businessman and U.S. Army officer
- Edward Trail Helfenstein, bishop of the Episcopal Diocese of Maryland
- Tim Hightower, professional football player
- Yan Huiqing, premier and president of the Republic of China
- James Addison Ingle, Episcopal missionary bishop in China
- Alex S. Jones, journalist and Pulitzer Prize winner
- Lester Kinsolving, journalist and radio host
- Lucien Lee Kinsolving, first Episcopal missionary bishop of Brazil
- Harry Klinefelter '30, endocrinologist and rheumatologist
- Tom Long, former CEO of MillerCoors
- John McCain '54, U.S. senator and 2008 Republican presidential nominee
- R. Walton Moore, U.S. representative from Virginia
- Arinze Onuaku, professional basketball player
- Forrest Pritchard, New York Times bestselling author and sustainable farmer
- Patrice Rene, professional football player
- Robert Goodwyn Rhett, mayor of Charleston and president of the Chamber of Commerce of the United States
- Julian Robertson, hedge fund manager
- Quentin Roosevelt, World War I aviator and son of President Theodore Roosevelt
- Shep Rose, Southern Charm cast member
- Kenneth Claiborne Royall, last U.S. Secretary of War and first Secretary of the Army
- Horace Smithy, cardiac surgeon who performed early heart valve surgeries
- Bryson Spinner, professional football player
- Ernie Stires, musician and composer
- Ernest M. Stires, Episcopal Bishop of Long Island
- Robert E. L. Strider, president of Colby College (1942–1960)
- Logan Taylor, professional football player
- Pembroke Lea Thom, Maryland state delegate
- Thomas J. H. Trapnell, U.S. Army general and Bataan Death March survivor
- Luiji Vilain, professional football player
- Mason Wiley, co-author of The Official Preppy Handbook
- Theodore Wong, Chinese translator
- Caroline Calloway, writer and social media personality
