= Robert Pelton Sibley =

Robert Pelton Sibley (March 26, 1879 - November 3, 1957) was an American academic and a headmaster of Deerfield Academy.

Born in Westfield, Massachusetts, Sibley graduated from Amherst College in 1900. At commencement, he was awarded the Henry D. Hyde prize in oratory, a victory reported in The New York Times.

From 1900 to 1902, he was the fiftieth head of school, or principal as the position was then known, of Deerfield Academy. He was succeeded by Frank Boyden.

In 1903, he graduated from Columbia University with a Master of Arts degree.

In 1907, he took up a post as an instructor in English at Ohio Wesleyan University.

From 1909 to 1920, he was professor of English language and literature at Lake Forest College, where he also served as registrar. In his final year there, the University awarded him an honorary doctorate in humane letters.

From 1920, he was a faculty member and secretary of Cornell University's College of Agriculture. Six years later he was transferred to the College of Arts and Sciences. There he would serve as assistant dean, secretary of the university faculty, and chairman of the faculty committee on student affairs.

In 1934, he became the second husband of Cora Billard Wickham, the widow of James Wickham.

Sibley died at age 78 at his home in New Suffolk, New York. His death was noted by an obituary in The New York Times, which remarked that he had "become known as a specialist in American fiction."
