= William Bee Ravenel III =

William Bee Ravenel III (Aug 9, 1914 – May 12, 1968) was an educator and a soldier. As head of the English Department at the Episcopal High School in Alexandria, Virginia, he was a major influence on the life of Arizona senator and 2008 U.S. presidential candidate John McCain, who called Ravenel "one of the finest men I have ever known". During World War II Maj. Ravenel received both the Silver Star and the Bronze Star with two Oak Leaf Clusters while serving in the 6th Armored Division of General George Patton's Third Army. He became a Colonel in the U.S. Army Reserve while teaching at Episcopal High.

Sen. McCain reflected on the positive impact Mr. Ravenel had on his life in an interview with the Harvard Mentoring Project of the Harvard School of Public Health: "I have never forgotten the confidence his praise gave me. Nor did I ever forget the man who praised me. Years later, during the time I was imprisoned in Vietnam, I thought about Mr. Ravenel a lot. He was the one who reinforced in me the standards of honorable behavior. I was faced with several decisions and one in particular, would I accept an offer of the Vietnamese to go home early? I thought about the fact that Mr. Ravenel had been in combat in World War II and thus had a feel for what I was involved in. And I really believed, as I thought about it and considered it, that Mr. Ravenel wouldn't look favorably upon such a decision, because it was not an honorable one. So, I refused the offer...

"After I returned home, Mr. Ravenel was the only person outside of my family who I wanted to see, because his approval or disapproval of me was probably more important than anyone else's in my life, outside of my father's. I felt he was someone to whom I could explain what had happened to me, and who would understand. That is a high tribute to Mr. Ravenel.

"I regret that I was never able to pay him that tribute. Upon return I found that my mentor had passed on. Mr. Ravenel had died of a heart attack two years [sic] before my release from prison. He lived for only 53 years. His early death was a great loss to his family, friends, and students, and to everyone who had been blessed with his company; a loss I found difficult to accept.

"Were William B. Ravenel the only person I remembered from high school, I would credit those days as among the best of my life. He was an inspirational man, and I wasn't the only one that he inspired. His influence over my life, while perhaps not apparent to most who have observed its progress, was more important and more benevolent than that of any other person save members of my family."
