= Ten Schools Admission Organization =

Consortium of ten American boarding schools

- Abbreviation: TSAO
- Formation: 1952
- Type: Educational consortium
- Purpose: Admission outreach and collaboration
- Region served: Northeastern United States
- Members: Andover, Choate, Deerfield, Exeter, Hill, Hotchkiss, Lawrenceville, Loomis Chaffee, St. Paul's, and Taft.
- Website: tenschools.org

The Ten Schools Admission Organization (TSAO), established in 1952, is a collaborative consortium of ten highly selective college-preparatory boarding schools located primarily in the Northeastern United States. The organization coordinates collective outreach and domestic and international recruitment efforts, while maintaining shared admissions standards, such as a uniform enrollment decision deadline of April 10.

Sociologists have identified the member institutions as part of a "select" tier of American secondary schools that play a significant role in the socialization of the American elite and the maintenance of class cohesion through rigorous academic and social "crucibles." As a group, the member institutions are characterized by their substantial financial endowments and their historical status as "feeder schools" for the Ivy League and other highly selective universities. Collectively, the schools award over $125 million in financial aid annually to support a diverse student body.

== Overview ==
Member institutions cooperate in their outreach to prospective students, sharing resources at domestic and international admission fairs.

Although several TSAO schools no longer publish their endowment figures, in 2016 the TSAO contained ten of the twenty wealthiest traditional college-preparatory boarding schools in the United States, as measured by total size of endowment. Seven TSAO members are also members of the Eight Schools Association, another group of large college-preparatory boarding schools.

At times, TSAO schools adopt common policies with respect to applicants and admitted students, such as a uniform deadline to accept or reject offers of admission. The TSAO does not have a uniform policy with respect to standardized testing, and two of its member schools remain test-optional as of the 2024–25 application cycle.

With one exception, every TSAO member educates both boarding and day students, and offers a postgraduate year. St. Paul's School educates only boarders, and admits neither post-graduates nor incoming seniors.

== Member schools ==
TSAO member institutions
School	Location	Established	Enrollment (2021–22)	Campus type (NCES)	PG year (approx. students)	Standardized test required?	Source(s)
Choate Rosemary Hall	Wallingford, CT	1890	868	Suburban	Yes (15–25)	No	
Deerfield Academy	Deerfield, MA	1797	666	Rural	<!--number not published-->	Yes	
The Hill School	Pottstown, PA	1851	520	Suburban	Yes (14–20)	Yes	
Hotchkiss School	Lakeville, CT	1891	622	Rural	Yes<!--number not published-->	Yes	
Lawrenceville School	Lawrenceville, NJ	1810	818	Suburban	Yes<!--number not published-->	Yes	
Loomis Chaffee School	Windsor, CT	1914	736	Suburban	Yes (20–25)	No	
Phillips Academy	Andover, MA	1778	1,187	Suburban	Yes (~20)	Yes	
Phillips Exeter Academy	Exeter, NH	1781	1,064	Suburban	Yes (~24)	Yes	
St. Paul's School	Concord, NH	1856	542	Town	No	Yes	
Taft School	Watertown, CT	1890	601	Suburban	Yes<!--number not published-->	Yes	

== See also ==
- Saint Grottlesex
- Eight Schools Association
- College-preparatory school
- Mid-Atlantic Boarding School Group
