= Alfred Berkeley =

American businessman

Alfred R. Berkeley, III (born in 1944) is an American businessman who was president of NASDAQ Stock Market, Inc. from 1996 until 2000 and later vice-chair of the NASDAQ from 2000 to 2003. Currently, Berkeley is Chairman of Princeton Capital Management, LLC. Berkeley was also director of RealPage, Inc.

== Education and career ==
Berkeley graduated from Episcopal High School and then earned a B.A. from the University of Virginia. While at UVA, Berkeley participated in a prank in which a live calf was left on the roof of the Rotunda. He received his M.B.A. from The Wharton School at the University of Pennsylvania.

Berkeley is Chairman of Princeton Capital Management. Berkeley was also Chairman of Noxilizer, Inc. Formerly, Berkeley was chairman of the board of Pipeline Financial Group, Inc. the parent of Pipeline Trading Systems LLC, an equities and options trading system designed to hide the presence of large orders in the market.

He was appointed vice-chair of the NASDAQ Stock Market Inc. in July 2000, serving through July 2003, and served as President of NASDAQ from 1996 until 2000. Before NASDAQ, Berkeley was a General Partner and then a managing director of Alex. Brown & Sons, an investment bank.

He was a Captain in the 438th Military Airlift Wing of the United States Air Force from 1968 to 1972. He served in the USAF Reserve from 1978 to 1980, as a Major.

Berkeley was a trustee of the Johns Hopkins University, was on the board of the Johns Hopkins University Applied Physics Laboratory, LLC. and was a Trustee of Allen University in Columbia, South Carolina. He served as vice-chairman and Acting Chairman of the President's National Infrastructure Advisory Council. He was a Director of The World Economic Forum USA and was Chairman of XBRL US, a non-profit established to set standards for GAAP taxonomies to be used by public companies to report to the US Securities and Exchange Commission. He was a director of XBRL International. He was a Director of Realpage, Inc., Security First Corp., Gentag, Inc. and Chesapeake Bay Outward Bound School, Inc. He is also on the board of the American Resilience Project, which produces documentaries on climate change. He is a director of Differential Dynamics, Inc. He was a trustee of the Mathematical Sciences Research Institute and was a trustee of the Nature Conservancy. Berkeley was a member of the board of directors of WebEx Communication, Inc., ACI Worldwide, Inc., Policy Management Systems Corporation, Safeguard Scientific, Inc., Comshare, Inc., Cognos, Inc., Edgar Online and Kintera, Inc. He served as a member of the Public Affairs Advisory Group for the Director of the National Science Foundation and a member of a sub-committee of the Future of Science Committee for the Secretary of Energy. He served as Vice Chair of the Evaluation Committee for the National Medal of Technology and Innovation. He has testified before the Joint Committee on Economics of the United States Congress, and before the House Science Committee, the House Permanent Select Committee on Intelligence and the House Committee on Homeland Security. He served on the International Advisory Council for the Monetary Authority of Singapore. Berkeley is a member of the Board of Visitors of the School of Medicine of the University of Maryland and was a Trustee of Hollins University.

In October 2011, Pipeline reached a settlement with the Securities and Exchange Commission over allegations that a Pipeline affiliate called Milstream may have traded with Pipeline customer orders without adequate disclosure. Mr. Berkeley agreed to pay the SEC $100,000 to settle the matter.
