= Eight Schools Association =

Educational consortium of eight US boarding schools

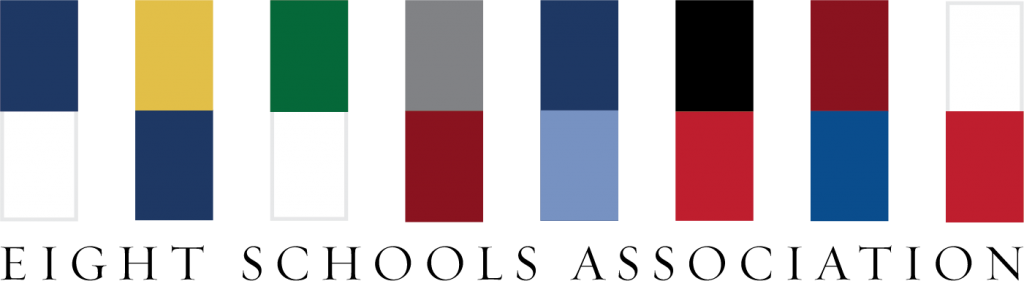
- Abbreviation: ESA
- Formation: 2006; 20 years ago
- Type: Educational consortium
- Purpose: Coordination among member schools
- Region served: Eastern United States
- Members: Andover, Choate, Deerfield, Exeter, Hotchkiss, Lawrenceville, NMH, and St. Paul's.
- Website: 8schools.org

The Eight Schools Association (ESA) is a consortium of eight private college-preparatory boarding schools in the Eastern United States. The schools' heads began meeting informally in 1973; the association incorporated as a nonprofit in 2006. The ESA holds regular meetings among school heads and organizes faculty conferences and joint academic programs.

The member schools are Phillips Academy (Andover), Phillips Exeter Academy, Choate Rosemary Hall, Deerfield Academy, Hotchkiss School, Lawrenceville School, Northfield Mount Hermon School, and St. Paul's School.

== Member schools ==
School	Location	Established	Enrollment (2024–25)	Net Assets (FY 2024)	Boarding Tuition (2025–26)	Sources
Choate Rosemary Hall (Choate)	Wallingford, CT	1890	860	$767,000,000	$71,420	
Deerfield Academy	Deerfield, MA	1797	649	$1,213,000,000	$74,750	
Hotchkiss School	Lakeville, CT	1891	614	$742,424,993	$75,790	
Lawrenceville School	Lawrenceville, NJ	1810	824	$1,025,851,644	$80,690	
Northfield Mount Hermon School (NMH)	Gill, MA	1879	630	$304,442,523	$77,070	
Phillips Academy (Andover)	Andover, MA	1778	1,165	$1,796,000,000	$76,731	
Phillips Exeter Academy (Exeter)	Exeter, NH	1781	1,106	$1,885,000,000	$69,537	
St. Paul's School	Concord, NH	1856	541	$953,124,341	$71,800	

== History ==
=== Informal origins (1973–2006) ===
During the 1973–74 school year, the heads of Andover, Choate, Deerfield, Exeter, Hotchkiss, Lawrenceville, and St. Paul's agreed to meet on a yearly, albeit informal, basis. After the first meeting, Northfield Mount Hermon was invited to join. According to Choate's website, the purpose of the ESA was "to show a connection between these [member] schools in academic philosophy, admissions standards, and athletic pursuits."

In 1996, the ESA agreed to add a second annual meeting to its calendar, with one meeting for the heads of school and the other for representatives of each school's boards of trustees.

The association requires unanimous consent to admit new members; none have been added since 1974.

=== Formal incorporation (2006–present) ===
In April 2006, the ESA schools established a more formal administrative structure, appointing a president, vice president, and executive director. These roles were staffed by administrators of the member schools (i.e., not full-time ESA employees), who would rotate every three years. The ESA also adopted bylaws which state that the ESA's primary purpose is to "address critical educational issues in order to ensure the best educational experiences and outcomes for students, explore new research and trends in education, and develop collaborative programs."

The ESA heads have continued meeting annually since 2006. Topics discussed at ESA meetings include economic difficulties in the private school industry, ways to improve boarding school affordability, and the economic feasibility of need-blind admissions. Previous invitees and speakers at these meetings include Harvard Graduate School of Education professor James P. Honan, former Dartmouth College president James Wright, journalist Steven Brill, and education policy specialists.

== Finances ==
The ESA does not hold a central endowment; each member school is independently governed and funded. As of fiscal year 2024, the eight schools reported combined net assets of approximately $8.7 billion. As of the 2025–26 school year, all eight schools commit to meeting 100% of demonstrated financial need for admitted U.S. citizen students.

== Joint initiatives ==
=== Athletics ===
Although the ESA schools are geographically dispersed, making it somewhat impractical to schedule consistent sports matchups, several ESA schools have sought to schedule each other in out-of-conference play. The ESA held wrestling and basketball tournaments in 2007 and 2009. In 2015–16, the six ESA members closest to Boston (that is, all except Hotchkiss and Lawrenceville) announced their intention to start a new athletic conference. However, the schools did not register their conference with the New England Preparatory School Athletic Council, and as of 2024, several of these schools remain affiliated with other conferences.

=== Student and faculty cooperation ===
After formalizing the ESA, the schools identified several possible ideas for future cooperation, such as "a debate invitational, a joint literary publication, athletic play days, [...] a musical group jamboree," and "collaborating on critical issues like pandemic preparedness."

In the years immediately following the establishment of the ESA, the group conducted several joint projects:

- Faculty conferences. The schools have occasionally scheduled faculty conferences, such as the 2007 arts conference, the 2010 science conference, the 2010 language/cultural conference, and the 2012 and 2013 education technology conferences.
- Student publications. In August 2007, Deerfield published 8 × 8: Writings from the Eight School Association, a collection of student writing curated by teachers and student editors at the ESA schools. In the preface, Deerfield's head wrote that she hoped future editions of the collection would "fost[er] intellectual relationships among its members." In 2019, Andover's student newspaper attempted to survey the student bodies of all eight ESA schools, but for various reasons, four of the eight schools did not participate.
- Arts festivals. ESA schools have also hosted a jazz festival (April 2008) and drama festivals (April 2010).
- Online learning. The ESA has functioned as a regional consortium for online and blended learning among independent schools.
- Student competitions. As of 2010, ESA administrators were planning a "green campus" competition to encourage students to participate in environmental initiatives.

== See also ==
- Ten Schools Admissions Organization
- Mid-Atlantic Boarding School Group
