= The Headmaster (book) =

1966 book by John McPhee

The Headmaster: Frank L. Boyden of Deerfield
- Author: John McPhee
- Published: 1966
- ISBN: 0-374-51496-8

The Headmaster: Frank L. Boyden of Deerfield is a 1966 book by John McPhee, profiling Frank Boyden, the long-time headmaster of Deerfield Academy. The book was expanded from a magazine profile in The New Yorker.

== Critical reception ==
The Kirkus review called the book an "effortless portrait" and wrote that it was "much more interesting" than Roger Drury's Drury of St. Paul's (1964).

The Boston Globe review noted that the book was not only a depiction of Boyden, but also "a record of the touching and memorable partnership of a man and his wife."

Jan Ophus wrote in Education Week in 2000 that the book should be required reading for every high school principal.
