= Choate Rosemary Hall =

Private secondary school in Wallingford, Connecticut, USA

Location
- 333 Christian Street; Wallingford, Connecticut 06492; United States; 41°27′28″N 72°48′35″W

Information
- Type: Private, day, college-preparatory & boarding school
- Motto: Latin: Fidelitas et Integritas (Fidelity and Integrity)
- Religious affiliation: Nonsectarian
- Established: 1890 (136 years ago)
- Founders: Mary Atwater Choate; William Gardner Choate
- CEEB code: 070810
- NCES School ID: 00233261
- Head of school: Alex Curtis
- Teaching staff: 121.4 (on an FTE basis)
- Grades: 9–12 & Post graduate
- Gender: Co-educational
- Enrollment: 850 (2017–2018)
- Student to teacher ratio: 7.1
- Campus size: 458 acres (185 ha)
- Campus type: Suburban
- Colors: Choate blue, gold, rosemary blue
- Athletics conference: Founders League
- Mascot: Wild boar
- Nickname: Wild Boars
- Newspaper: The Choate News
- Yearbook: The Brief
- Endowment: $396 million (2022)
- School fees: Technology fee: $1,000
- Tuition: Boarding: $71,420; Day: $54,990
- Affiliations: Eight Schools Association; Ten Schools Admission Organization
- Website: choate.edu

Choate Rosemary Hall (/tʃoʊt/ CHOHT) is a private college-preparatory boarding school in Wallingford, Connecticut, United States. Founded in 1890, it took its present name and began a co-educational system with the 1978 merger of The Choate School for boys and Rosemary Hall for girls. It is part of the Eight Schools Association and the Ten Schools Admission Organization.

== History ==
=== Founders and early years ===
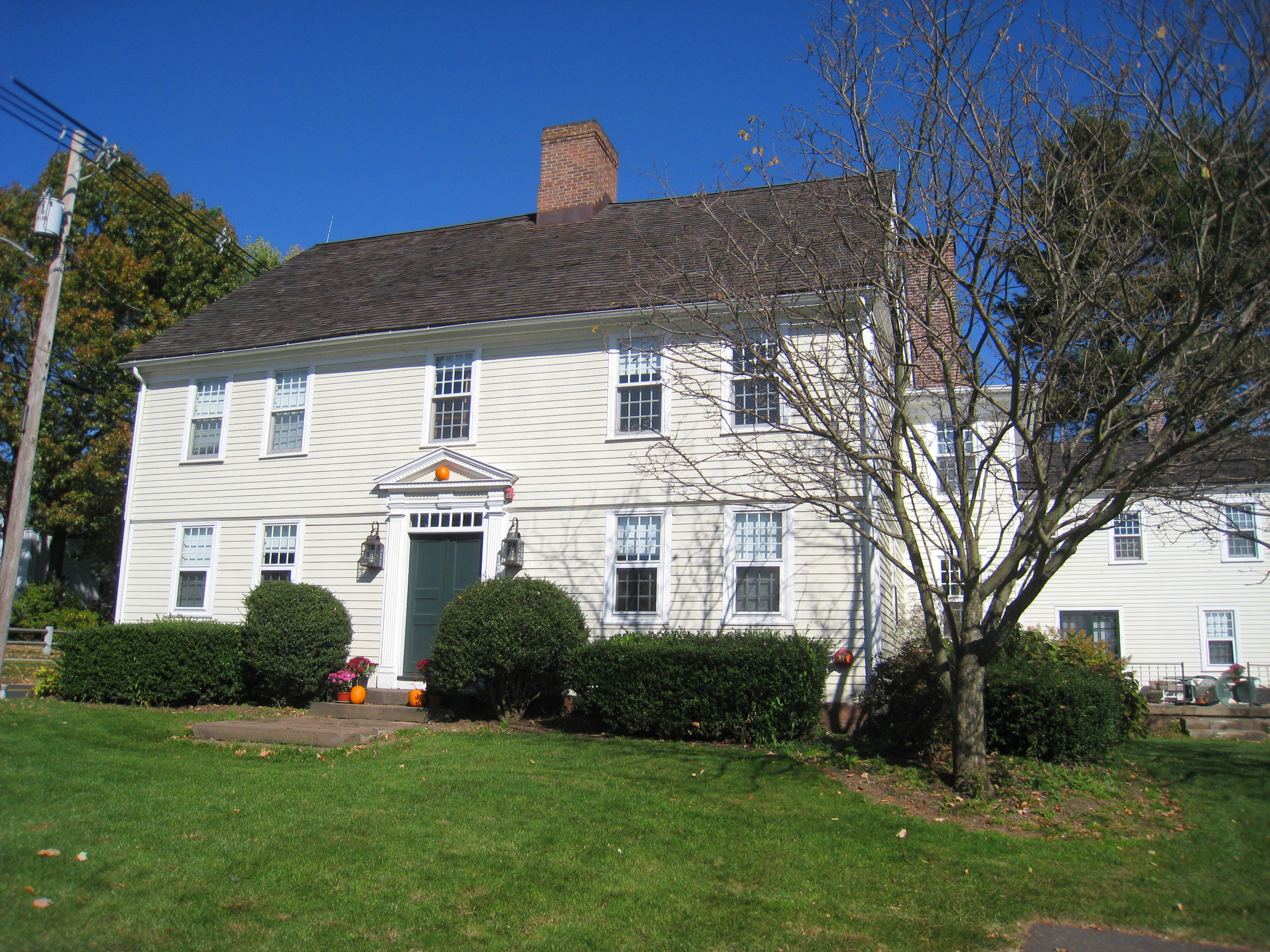
The "Homestead" (built in 1774) was the Choate family's summer home in Wallingford. According to the school newspaper, it is rumored to contain a secret passage to aid escaped slaves on the Underground Railroad.

Choate Rosemary Hall was formed in 1978 through the merger of two sister schools founded by Mary and William Choate in the 1890s. The Choates spent their summers in Mary's home town of Wallingford, Connecticut.

Mary, an alumna of Miss Porter's School, was the great-granddaughter of Caleb Atwater (1741–1832), a Connecticut merchant who supplied the American forces during the Revolutionary War.

William Gardner Choate (1830–1921) was a federal judge with the Southern District of New York from 1878 to 1881, before resigning to enter private practice. He was a national authority on railroad, bankruptcy, and corporation law. His brother Joseph Hodges Choate, another noted lawyer, served as the U.S. ambassador to the United Kingdom.

==== Rosemary Hall ====
In 1890, Mary Atwater Choate founded Rosemary Hall at the Atwater House on Rosemary Farm in Wallingford. Although Mary Choate initially envisioned that Rosemary Hall would train girls in the "domestic arts," the school's first headmistress Caroline Ruutz-Rees (1865–1954) adopted the mission of a contemporary boys' school, emphasizing academics and athletics. In 1936, Time reported that Rosemary Hall girls "work[ed] so hard [in the classroom] that when they get to Smith or Vassar it is often with a sigh of relief."

In 1900, Ruutz-Rees moved Rosemary Hall to Greenwich, Connecticut. She acquired a majority stake in the school and established its independence from the Choate family. Following the merger with Choate, the Greenwich campus was transferred to Daycroft School, which closed in 1991.

==== The Choate School ====
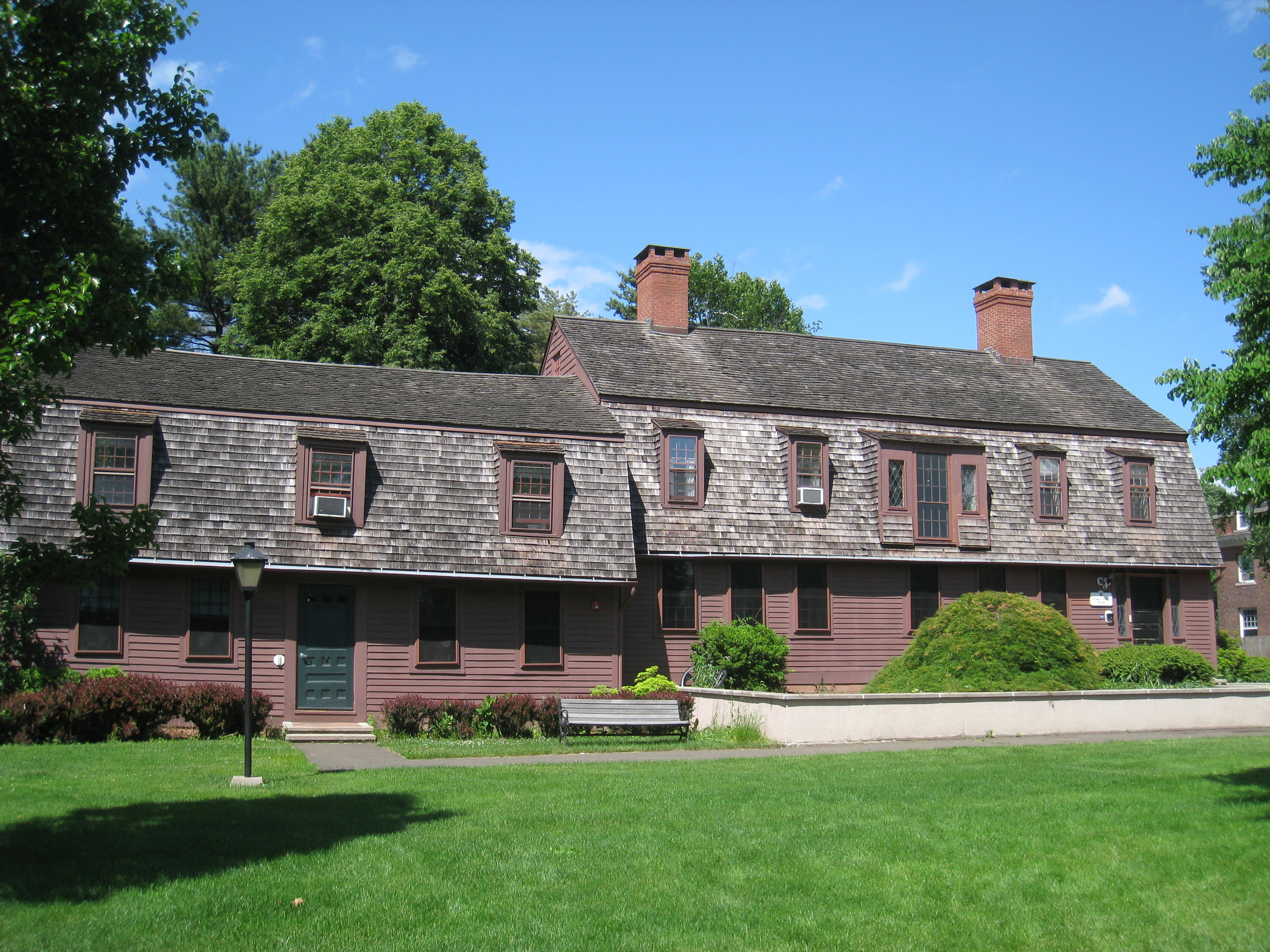
Squire Stanley House, Choate's first building, is now a girls' dormitory.

In 1896, William and Mary Choate established a boys' school in Wallingford. They hired Mark Pitman (1830–1905), the principal of Woolsey School in New Haven, Connecticut, as its first headmaster. The school began with six boys, with an average age of 10.

There was no formal relationship at the time with Rosemary Hall, but there were coeducational audiences for plays and recitals and Mary Choate hosted dances at the Homestead.

=== Choate School: The St. John Years ===
From 1908 to 1973, control over the Choate School passed from the Choate family to the St. John family. Under the St. Johns, Choate became one of the largest boarding schools in New England.

In 1908, George St. John (headmaster 1908–47), an Episcopal priest who had previously taught at Hackley School, The Hill School, and Adirondack-Florida School, became headmaster. At the time, Choate was losing money and had only 51 students. With support from shareholders, St. John bought out the Choate family and incorporated the school as a for-profit corporation; the school reorganized as a non-profit in 1938. St. John believed that expanding enrollment would improve the school's financial resources and allow him to offer more amenities to his students. Enrollment jumped from 51 students in 1908 to 230 in 1918, 452 in 1928, and roughly 600 by 1947.

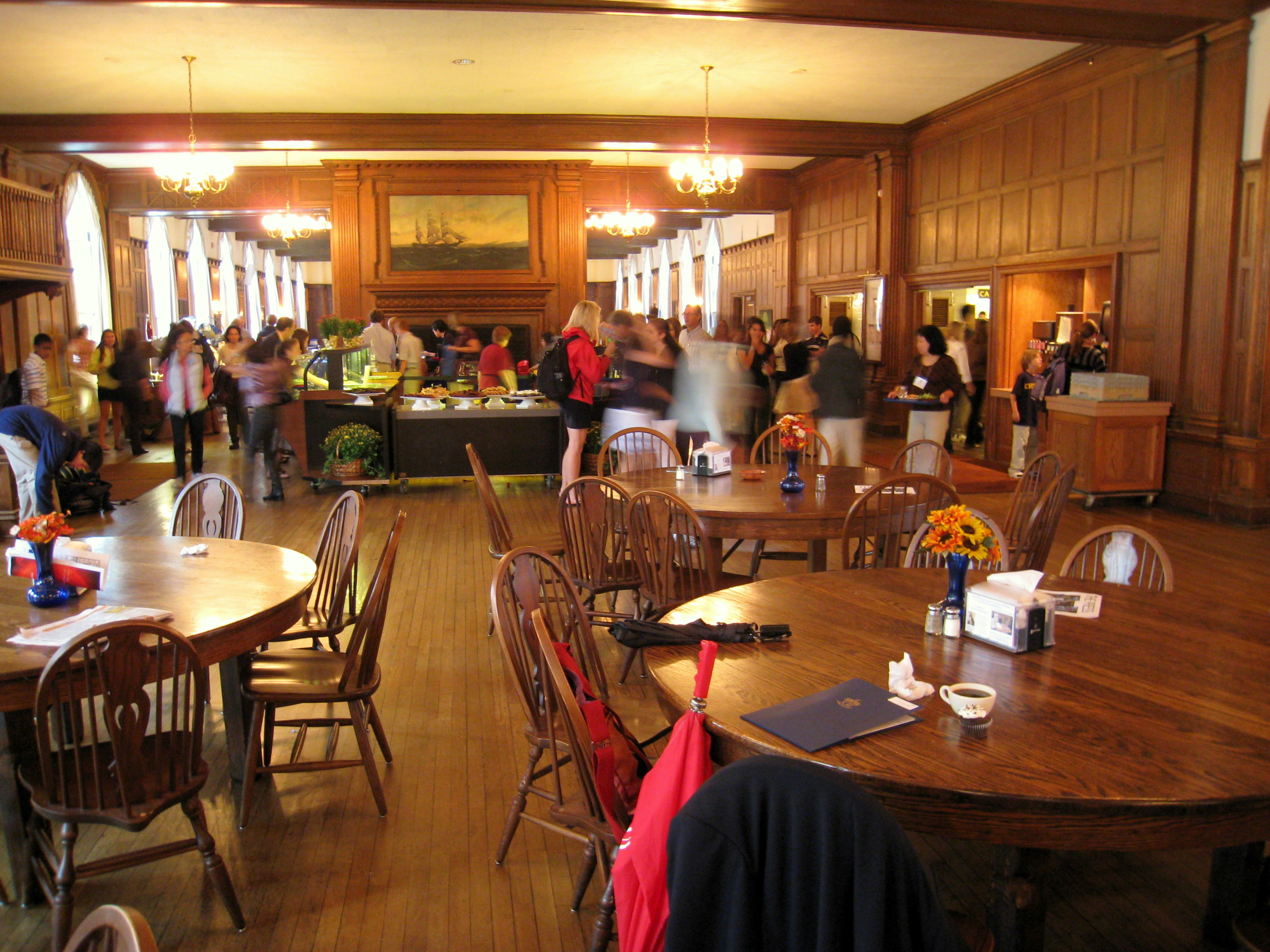
Hill House contains Choate's dining hall.

George St. John built most of the modern-day Choate campus, including Hill House, West Wing, the Gymnasium, Memorial House, the Chapel, the Library, the Winter Exercise Building, and Archbold Infirmary, which was the nation's largest school infirmary. In the decade following the First World War, Choate sent 412 of its 618 graduates to Yale, Princeton, and Harvard, according to a 1928 edition of the school newspaper.

George St. John was succeeded in 1947 by his son Seymour '31 (headmaster 1947–73). Under Seymour St. John, Choate admitted its first black student in 1959, increased the share of international students to 15% of the student body, lifted the Sunday chapel attendance requirement, and temporarily abolished A–F grades. An ambitious builder, Seymour St. John invested heavily in improving accommodations for students and faculty. He also hired I. M. Pei to build a $6 million arts center (nearly $50 million in 2024 dollars), which opened in 1972.

Seymour St. John's final major achievement was bringing Rosemary Hall back to Wallingford in 1971. To accommodate Rosemary Hall's 230 students, Choate spent an additional $3 million to build what was essentially "a new campus" in Wallingford. The two schools appointed a common president in 1973 and formally merged in 1978.

=== JFK, the Muckers, and "Ask not" ===
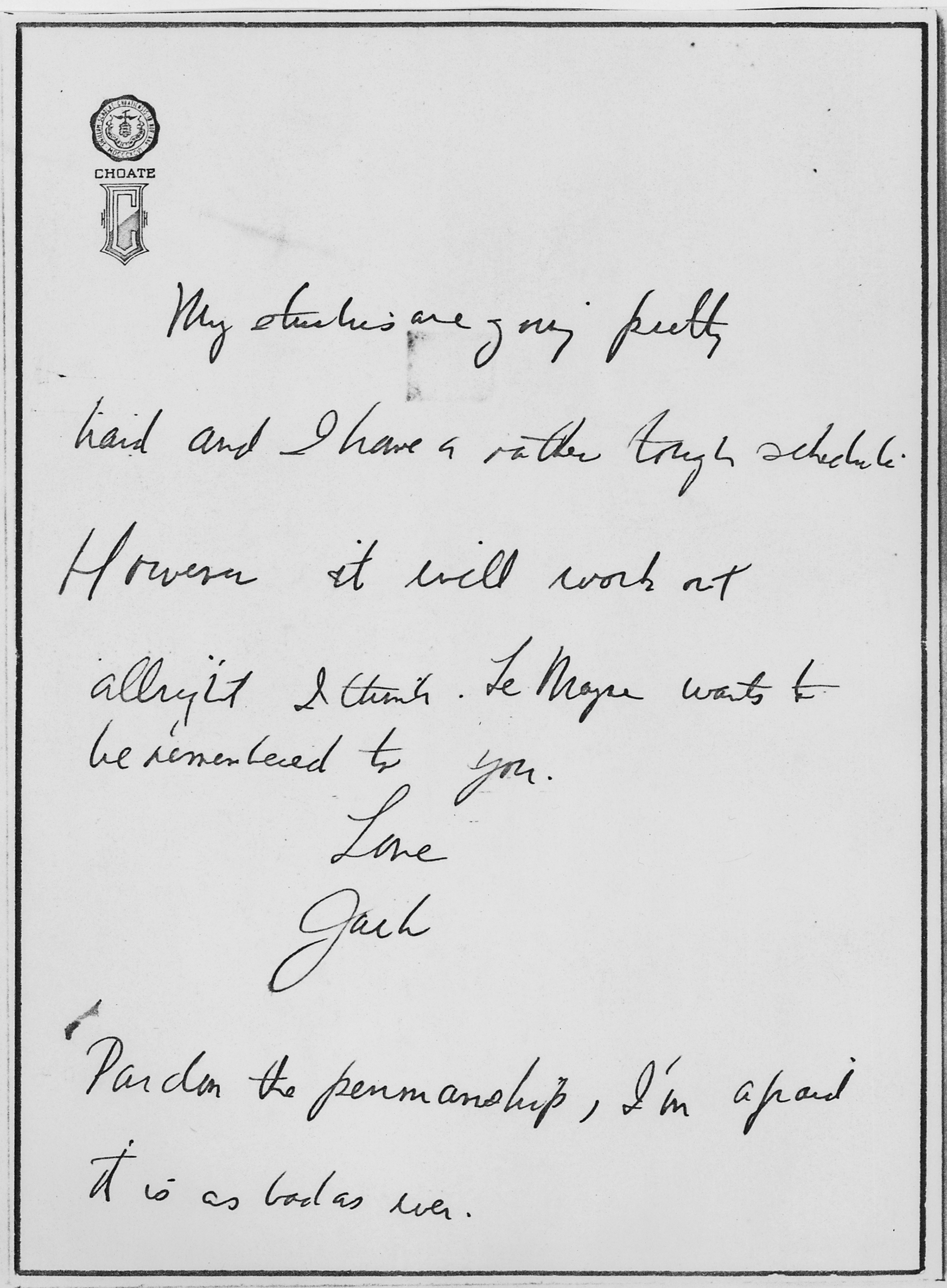
John Kennedy '35 writes home on school stationery to say his "studies are going pretty hard" and mentioning LeMoyne Billings '35, his roommate and lifelong closest friend

In 1931, John F. Kennedy entered Choate as a third form (9th grade) student, following his older brother Joe Jr., who was a star athlete at the school.

Jack Kennedy—sickly, underweight, and nicknamed Rat Face by his schoolfellows—spent his first two years at Choate in his brother's shadow, and compensated for it with rebellious behavior that attracted a coterie. He named his group The Muckers Club, which had thirteen members—Kennedy and twelve disciples. Among these was Kennedy's lifelong friend Kirk LeMoyne "Lem" Billings, who kept an apartment in the White House during JFK's presidency.

Kennedy graduated from Choate in 1935. In senior class polling for the yearbook (of which he was business manager), he was voted 'Most Likely to Succeed'.

It has been suggested that the oft-remembered quote from Kennedy's inauguration may have originated from a common refrain from Choate headmaster, George St. John's chapel talks: "The youth who loves his alma mater will always ask not 'What can she do for me?' but 'What can I do for her?'"

=== Modern era ===
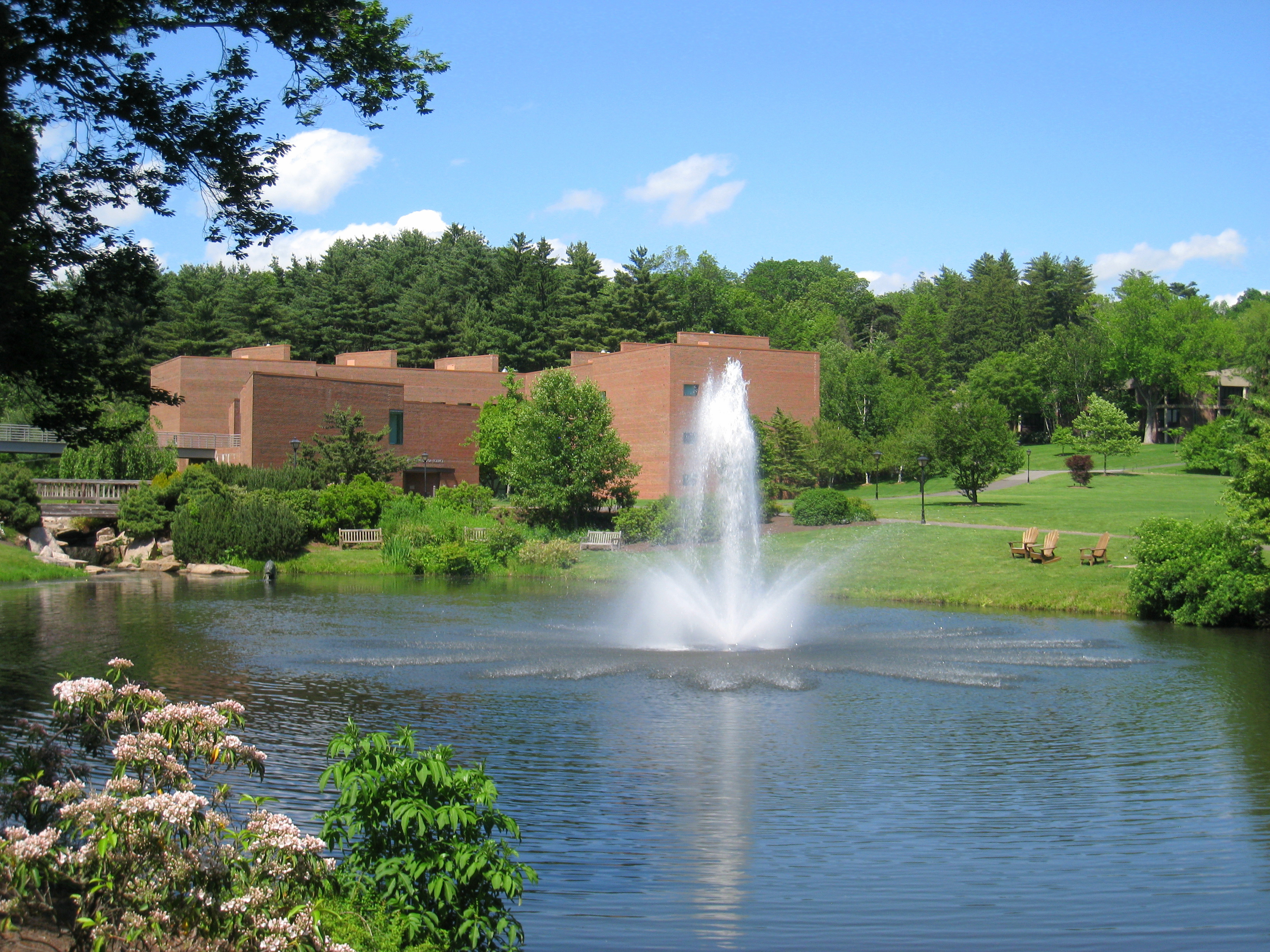
The Carl Icahn Center for Science was opened in 1989.

Following Seymour St. John's retirement, the school was hit hard by financial difficulties in the 1970s. It responded by adding even more students, growing from 843 students in 1973 to 926 in 1978 and 1,021 by 1994. The school's finances eventually stabilized. In 1989, Choate opened a second I. M. Pei building, the science center.

Starting in the 1990s, Choate adopted a policy of shrinking the student body, growing its financial resources, and being more selective in admissions. In 1994, the board of trustees agreed to trim the size of the student body to 821. Choate's acceptance rate declined from 60% in 1991 to 23% in 2016. Choate also embarked on a series of large-scale fundraising campaigns, raising over $100 million from 1995 to 2000; $220 million from 2006 to 2011; and $334 million from 2023 to 2024.

In 2008, Karl Rove was invited to deliver the commencement address but withdrew after a majority of seniors voted against the invitation and certain students threatened to walk out. The New York Times reported that the school's student body "ha[s] been known to trend decidedly blue."

=== Sexual abuse scandal (2016, 2017) ===
In October 2016, following one alumna's public disclosure of sexual abuse in the Boston Globe, Choate retained Covington & Burling LLP to conduct an investigation and write a report on historical occurrences of sexual misconduct.

In April 2017, the school published Covington's investigation report, which acknowledged repeated instances of sexual misconduct against dozens of students from the 1960s through the 2010s (most of the incidents reportedly took place in the 1980s); the report implicated at least 12 former faculty and staff members. The school admitted that although it had been aware of some misconduct, it had not reported any misconduct to the police; accordingly, the Connecticut Department of Children and Families accused Choate of violating its mandatory reporter obligations. Following publication of the report, two former headmasters resigned from the Choate board of trustees.

== Academics ==
=== Curriculum ===
Choate's curriculum includes elective and interdisciplinary courses, from astronomy and architecture to printmaking and post-modernism to digital video and development economics. There are more than 300 courses in the curriculum, which has requirements in community service and in contemporary global studies. All disciplines except English have honors courses.

=== Signature programs ===
The Choate signature programs include the Advanced Robotics Program, Arabic and Middle Eastern Studies, Arts Concentration, Capstone, Environmental Immersion Program, JFK Program in Government and Public Service, Science Research Program, and the Global Education Program.

==== Musical appearances ====
The Choate chamber orchestra performed at the White House in December 2009 and the school's symphony orchestra toured Europe in 2010 and 2011, giving concerts in ten countries. The festival and chamber choruses performed at St. Patrick's Day mass at St. Peter's Basilica in Rome in 2011.

The school's student-operated radio station, WWEB, was FCC-licensed and founded in 1969.

=== Specialized programs ===
The Senior Project Program provides on- or off-campus internships in academic research, visual art, and the performing arts.

Other specialized programs include American Studies, creative writing, economics, FBLA, mathematics, philosophy, psychology, religion, debate, and the Fed Challenge. The 2011–12 academic year saw the introduction of an Arabic and Middle Eastern Studies Program (AMES). Choate's Office of Global Studies supports study-abroad and other international initiatives. One-third of Choate students participate in programs in China, France, Japan, Spain, and Jordan.

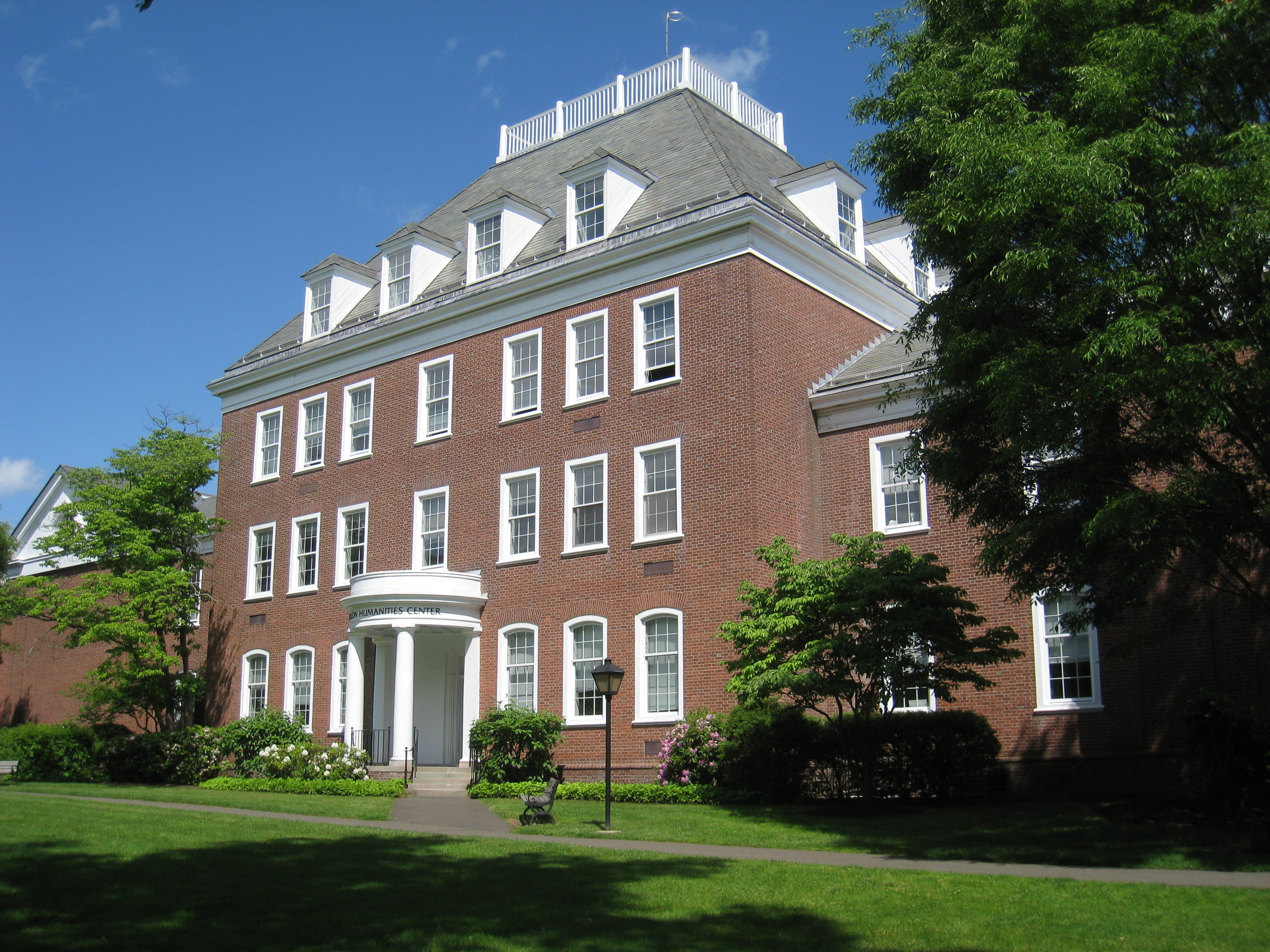
Paul Mellon Humanities Center, built 1938, designed by Charles Fuller

==== Environmental Center ====
The Kohler Environmental Center, designed by Robert A.M. Stern Architects, opened in 2012 and is located on a 268-acre site in the northeast quadrant of the campus. It has been described as "the first teaching, research and residential environmental center in U.S. secondary education."

==== STEM ====
In February 2015, the school opened the Lanphier Center for Mathematics and Computer Science, a 35,000-square foot campus hub for information technology, applied mathematics, and robotics. The center, designed by Pelli Clarke Pelli, contains laboratories, classrooms, a lecture hall, and common spaces.

==== National Fed Challenge ====
Choate's Fed Challenge team was the 2009 national champion and has won the New England District Championship in 12 of the past 13 years. In the 2012 American Mathematics Competitions (AMC) 12-A, Choate's team finished first in the nation, with the highest combined score of all 2631 participating schools. (Note: To find this information, select "AMC 10/12 A 02/07/2012", then "AMC 12", then "School Honor Roll" as the query.)

=== Use of technology ===
In 2012, Choate became the first among its peer preparatory schools to require that all faculty and students own an iPad. The fall term that year saw the beginning of full integration of the tablet's capabilities into the syllabus. Today, all Choate students are provided an iPad and Apple Pencil as part of tuition and fees. Choate's director of academic technology discussed Choate's iPad program in an August 2012 article in US News.

== Statistical profile ==
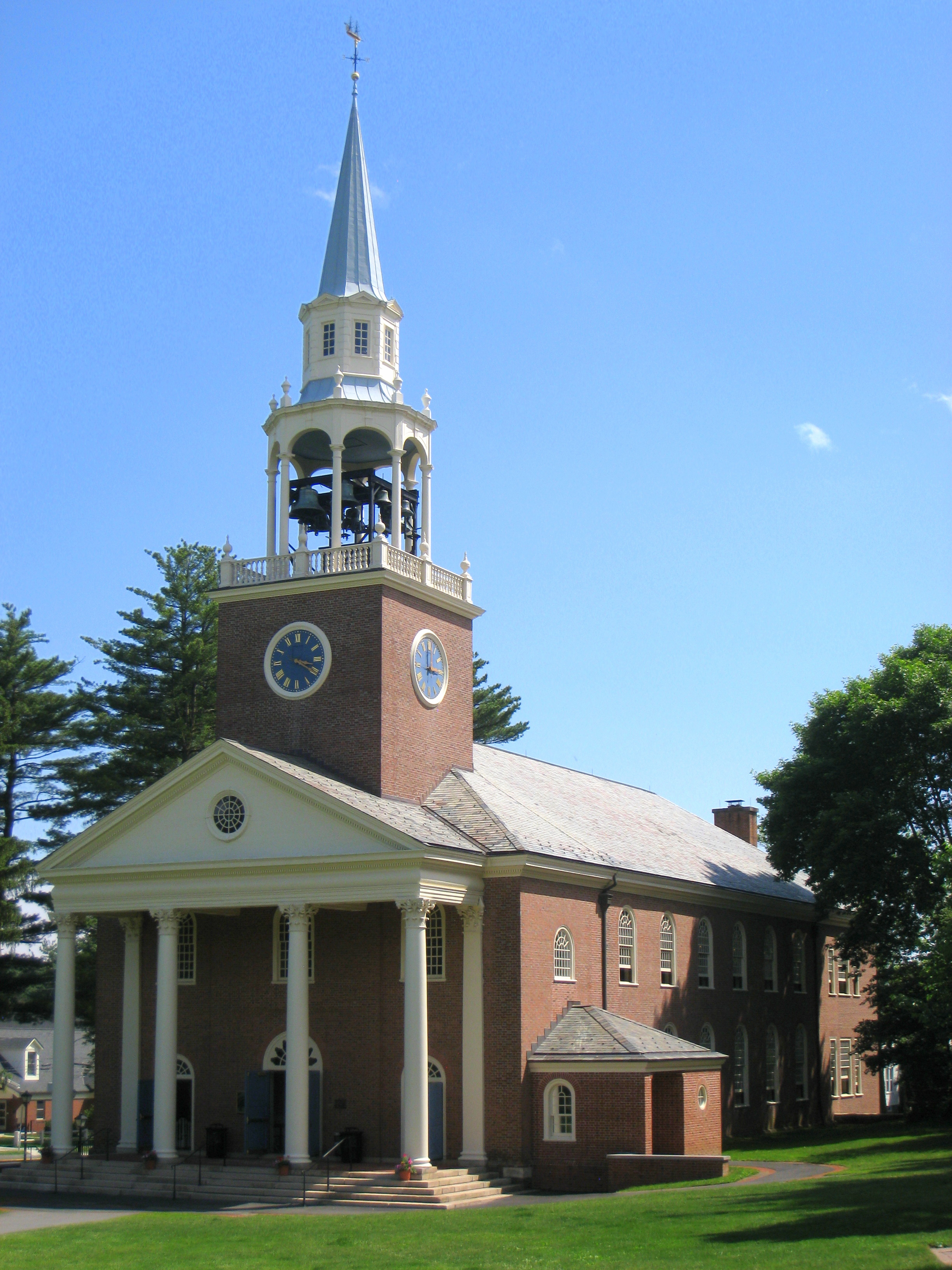
Seymour St. John Chapel, built 1924, designed by Ralph Adams Cram

=== Enrollment ===
During the 2026–27 school year, Choate reported that it enrolled 860 students, employed 116 full-time equivalent teaching staff, and had a student-teacher ratio of 7 to 1.

=== Tuition and financial aid ===
In the 2023–24 school year, Choate charged boarding students $67,380 and day students $51,880, plus other mandatory and optional fees.

Choate offers need-based financial aid. The 2026-27 financial aid budget was 17million. 36% of the student body are on financial aid and the average aid grant is 80% of tuition. The school commits to meet 100% of an admitted student's demonstrated financial need.

Students are supported beyond the cost of tuition by the Beyond the Classroom Fund. In 2025-26 nearly $340,000 in mini-grants were awarded to support student travel, activities, and participation in the full experience of campus life.

=== Endowment and expenses ===
At the end of 2022, Choate's financial endowment stood at $396 million. Choate also reported $76.1 million in program service expenses and $13.8 million in grants (primarily student financial aid).

=== Religious profile ===
Protestant, Catholic, Jewish, and Muslim chaplains serve Choate's campus ministry.

== Extracurricular activities ==
=== Athletics ===
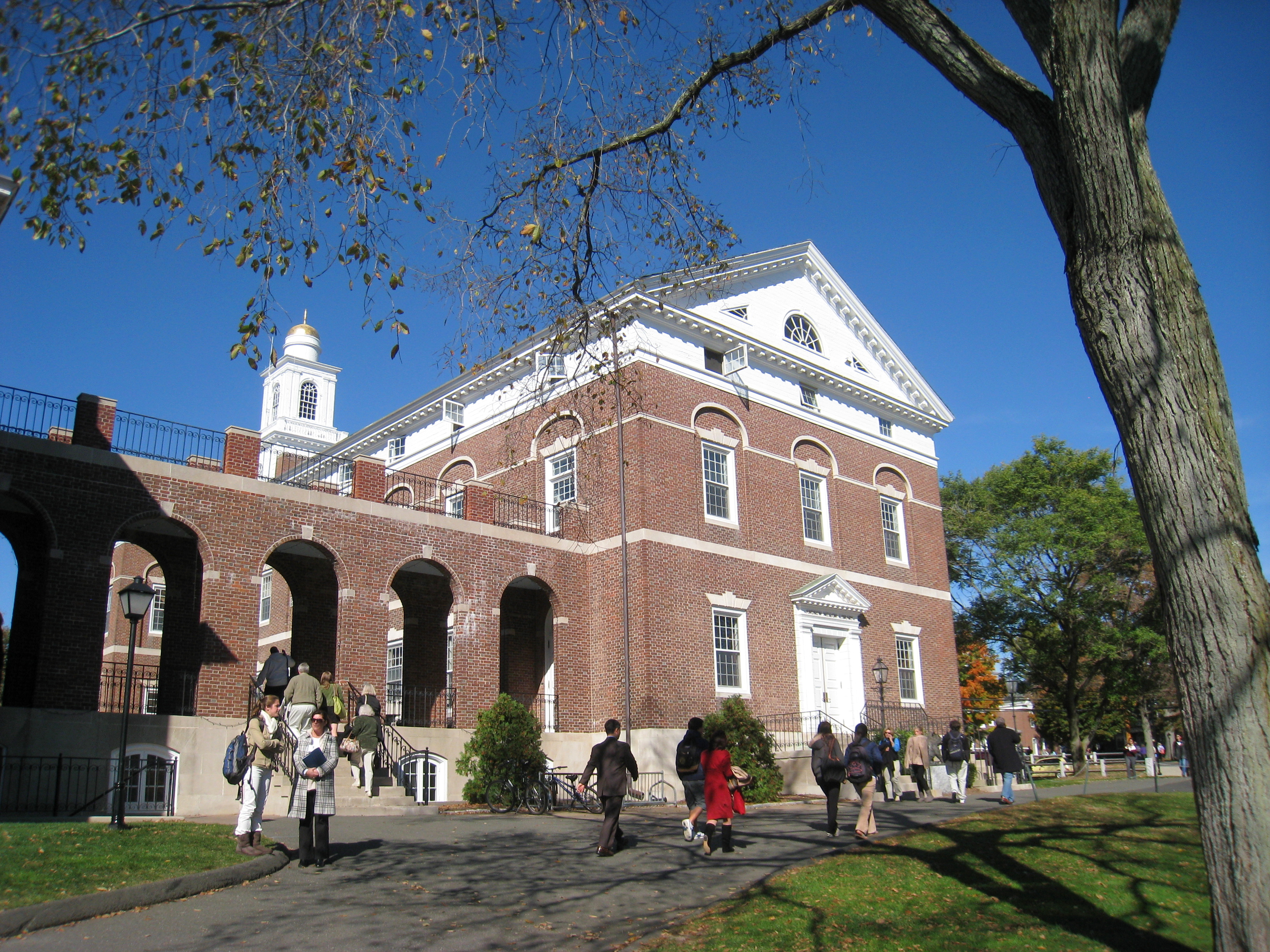
Andrew Mellon Library, built 1925

Choate is a member of the Founders League, and competes against schools in the New England and the Mid-Atlantic regions. The athletic directors of Choate and the other members of the Eight Schools Association compose the Eight Schools Athletic Council, which organizes sports events and tournaments among ESA schools.

Choate offers teams at the varsity, JV, and thirds (freshman) levels. There are 32 different sports and 81 teams in interscholastic competition. Intramural programs include aerobics, dance, senior weight training, yoga, winter running, rock climbing, fitness and conditioning, and senior volleyball.

Since 1922, Choate's athletic rival has been Deerfield Academy.

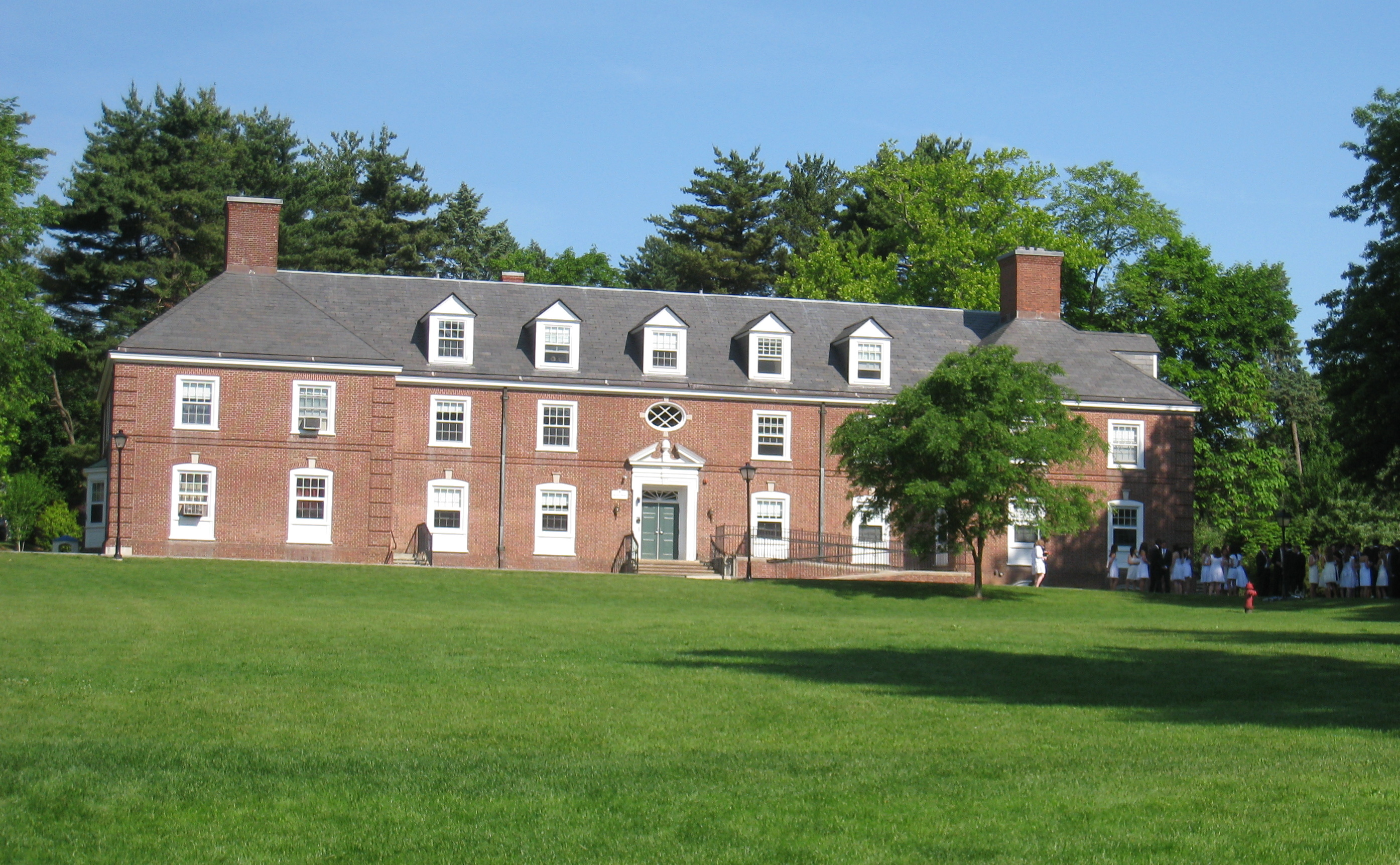
Nichols House, built 1948, designed by Polhemus & Coffin. In 1971 it was the inaugural girls' dormitory on the original boys' campus

From 2007 to 2016, Choate won New England championships in football, boys and girls ice hockey, girls' soccer, boys' golf, boys' crew, and in girls' swimming, volleyball, and water polo. In that same period, Choate won Founders League championships in boys' and girls' squash, in boys' cross country, golf, softball, and tennis, and in girls' volleyball.

=== Historic cricket match ===
In 1895, Rosemary Hall hosted a cricket match with Mrs. Hazen's School of Pelham Manor, N.Y., that has been described by some as "the first interscholastic girls sporting event in American history."
