= Mid-Atlantic Boarding School Group =

Group of boarding schools in Mid-Atlantic United States

Location of the school on the map of the Mid-Atlantic States.

The Mid-Atlantic Boarding School Group (MABS) is a group of private, college-preparatory boarding schools in the Mid-Atlantic United States that cooperate in their outreach to prospective students.

== Overview ==
MABS consortium was established in 2014 by Blair Academy, Episcopal High School, Mercersburg Academy, and Peddie School. The St. Andrew's School joined the group a few months later as it had a significant applicant crossover.

Its member institutions cooperate in their outreach to prospective students, sharing resources at domestic and international admission fairs. While the initial focus was on making travel more efficient and effective, the group currently focuses on redefining the mid-Atlantic schools as a destination, and not simply an alternative – setting aside time to define the history and value of the mid-Atlantic. The small size allows the group to be more adaptable and form tight bonds professionally. The MABS group also facilitates collaboration between member schools, which can include shared academic standards, professional development for faculty, or athletics. The schools however do not have a uniform policy with respect to standardized testing and application deadlines.

MABS schools are located on historic campuses, and offer students a strong sense of tradition and state-of-the-art facilities. The schools have smaller enrollments and have low student-to-faculty ratio. Episcopal & St. Andrew's are 100% boarding schools, while the other three school educates both boarding and day students.

In 2025, all the five MABS member schools were ranked top-25 in wealthiest traditional college-preparatory boarding schools in the United States, as measured by total size of their financial endowments.

== Member schools ==
School	Location	Established	Enrollment (2023–24)	Endowment	Campus type (NCES if available)	URL	Source(s)
Blair Academy	Blairstown, NJ	1848	474	$145 million	Rural	blair.edu	
Episcopal High School	Alexandria, VA	1839	440	$382.5 million	City	episcopalhighschool.org	
Mercersburg Academy	Mercersburg, PA	1836	452	$422 million	Rural	mercersburg.edu	
Peddie School	Hightstown, NJ	1864	516	$451 million	Suburban	peddie.org	
St. Andrew's School (Delaware)	Middletown, DE	1929	320	$220 million	Rural	standrews-de.org	

== See also ==
- Saint Grottlesex
- Eight Schools Association
- Ten Schools Admissions Organization
