= Todd Gray (chef) =

American chef

Todd Gray is an American executive chef and co-owner of Equinox on 19th, formerly Equinox, a restaurant in Washington, D.C., and of Manna, an upscale restaurant located in the Museum of the Bible, also in the capital.

== Biography ==
Gray was born in Washington, D.C. and attended Episcopal High School in Alexandria, Virginia. He studied art at the undergraduate level at the University of Richmond, but decided to change to the culinary arts and studied at the Culinary Institute of America. After this, he was an intern in some of the country's popular kitchens, following which he spent four years learning from Robert Greault in a French restaurant, and then seven years in an Italian one with Roberto Donna. He was a 5 time James Beard Award Nominee for Best Chef Mid-Atlantic. He and his wife Ellen Kassoff Gray have created the cookbook The New Jewish Table.

In 2018, he drew attention for beginning to serve a sweet resin found on shrubs in the Middle East including tamarisk, that is thought by many scholars to the Biblical food manna at his restaurant, Manna.

== TV appearances ==
He was the host of an episode of Chefs A' Field and he was a guest in an episode of Tyler's Ultimate. In 2016 he was a contestant on Beat Bobby Flay, and lost to Flay in the second round. He was also on an episode of "Guy's Grocery Games".

== Awards and recognition ==
Awards and recognition for Gray include:

- James Beard Foundation, 5 nominations for Best Chef
- Mid-Atlantic Restaurant Association
- Metropolitan Washington’s RAMMY Award for Best Fine Dining Restaurant & Chef of the Year
- Washingtonian’s 100 Very Best Restaurants
- DiRoNA Award for Fine Dining
- Washington Post’s Top 50 restaurants
- Wine Spectator Award of Excellence
- Town & Country’s Best Restaurant in Washington, DC
- Conde Nast’s 60 Hot Tables
- Bon Appetit’s Top Tables
- Esquire’s Best New Restaurants
- Gourmet’s America’s Top Tables, Newcomer
