= Deerfield Academy =

Prep school in Deerfield, Massachusetts, US

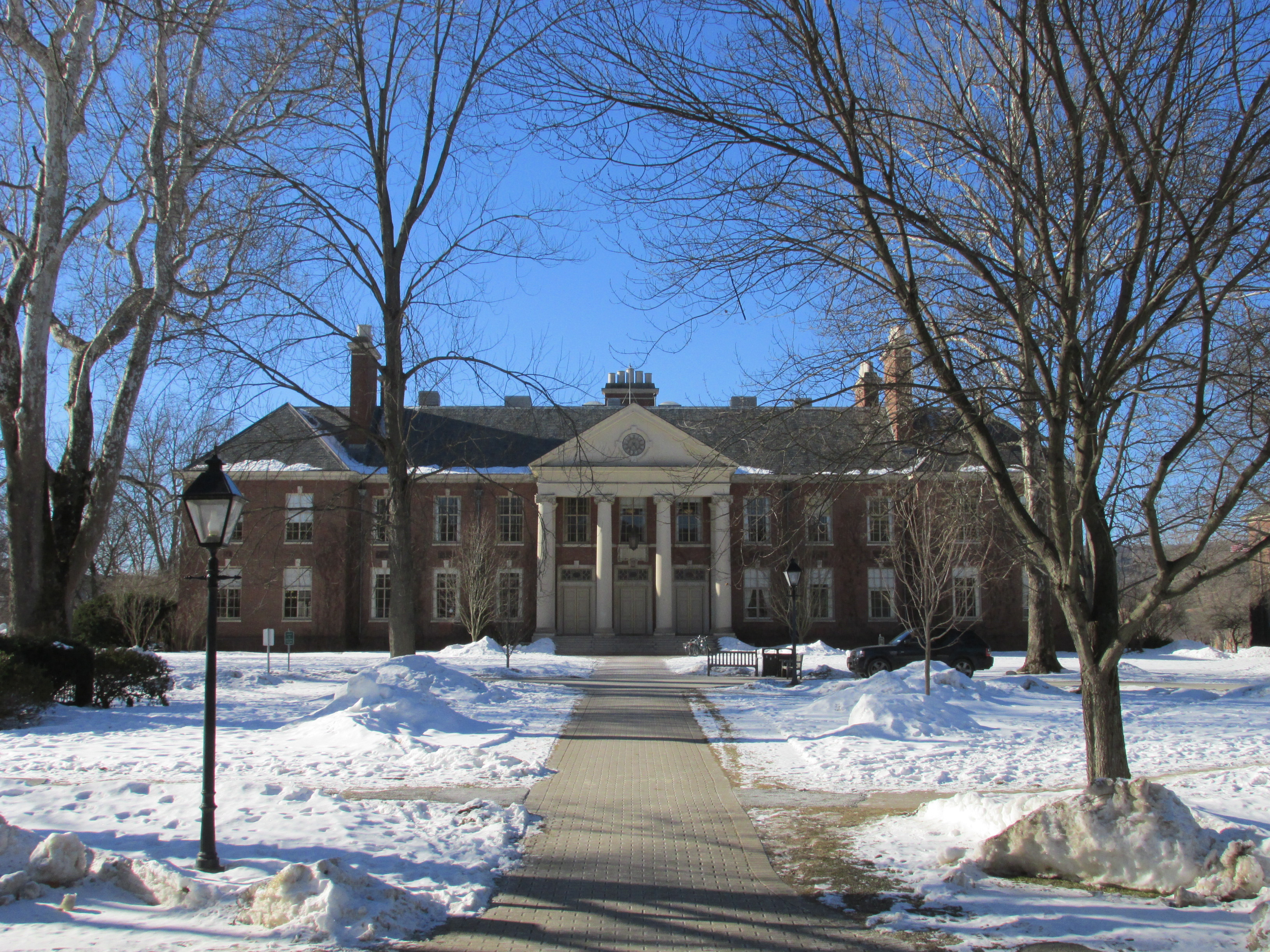
- The main school building of Deerfield Academy in 2013.

Location
- 7 Boyden Lane; Deerfield, Massachusetts 01342; United States; 42°32′47.19″N 72°36′19.06″W

Information
- Former name: Deerfield Academy and Dickinson High School (1876-1923)
- Type: Independent, boarding and day school
- Motto: Be Worthy of Your Heritage
- Religious affiliation: Nonsectarian
- Established: 1797
- CEEB code: 220685
- Head of school: John P.N. Austin
- Faculty: Approx. 150
- Grades: 9–12
- Gender: Co-educational
- Enrollment: Approx. 650
- Campus size: 330 acres (130 ha)
- Campus type: Rural
- Colors: Hunter green and white
- Team name: Big Green
- Rivals: Choate Rosemary Hall; Northfield Mount Hermon
- Newspaper: The Deerfield Scroll
- Yearbook: The Pocumtuck
- Endowment: $920 million (September 2024)
- Tuition: $74,440 (boarding) $53,860 (day)
- Affiliations: Eight Schools Association; Ten Schools Admission Organization
- Website: deerfield.edu

Deerfield Academy (often called Deerfield or DA) is an independent college-preparatory boarding and day school in Deerfield, Massachusetts. Chartered in 1797 and opening to students in 1799, it is one of the oldest secondary schools in the United States. It is a member of the Eight Schools Association and the Ten Schools Admission Organization.

== History ==
=== Early history ===
Deerfield Academy was founded in 1797 when Massachusetts governor Samuel Adams granted a charter to found a school "for the promotion of Piety, Religion & Morality, & for the Education of Youth in the liberal Arts & Sciences, & all other useful Learning." Having opened its doors to students in 1799, it is one of the oldest secondary schools in the United States.

The academy was established in the remote town of Deerfield, at the time "the principal [European] settlement on the western frontier." A Mr. John Williams organized a coalition of local grandees, including future U.S. congressmen Ebenezer Mattoon and Samuel Taggart, to raise $1,300 to build a school house and another $1,400 for an endowment. Deerfield educated both boys and girls since its founding.

Like many early "boarding" academies in New England, Deerfield did not have its own dormitories when it opened, and out-of-town students were required to rent rooms from local families. Deerfield did not open its first dormitory until ten years later. Despite this, the newly opened academy was able to attract many students from the surrounding area; of the school's first 269 students, 68 were from the town of Deerfield. At the turn of the nineteenth century, Deerfield had over 100 students.

Deerfield became a semi-public school in 1859, after the Massachusetts legislature ordered the town of Deerfield to establish a free public high school. In 1876, the academy was reincorporated as the Deerfield Academy and Dickinson High School, after local resident Esther Dickinson left the town $50,000 to build a new academic building (since demolished) and town library. The academy relied on tax revenue from the town until the 1920s.

Despite the town's financial support, the academy was in deep financial trouble by the end of the 19th century. Industrialization had depopulated large portions of western Massachusetts, depriving the academy of many potential students. From 1880 to 1900, the population of the town of Deerfield nearly halved, falling from 3,543 to 1,969. When headmaster Frank Boyden arrived in 1902, there were only fourteen students left, and the boarding department had already shut down.

=== Reestablishment as a college-preparatory school ===
In 1902, Deerfield hired the 22-year-old Frank Boyden as its new headmaster and was the only applicant for the position. Boyden transformed the academy into a private, boys-only college-preparatory boarding school that drew its students from the entire country rather than only the surrounding area.

Boyden gradually rebuilt the academy's enrollment, invested in teacher salaries, and developed strong relationships with college administrators. According to one story, a strong recommendation from Boyden could get a student into Princeton University even if Princeton had already decided to reject him. He restored Deerfield's boarding department in 1916, hoping to attract wealthy families whose tuition payments could rescue the school's financial situation. To attract boarders, Boyden hired advertising executive Bruce Barton to pitch Deerfield to prospective parents as "the cradle ... of the New England conscience," and popularized "[t]he notion of the Deerfield Boy ... intelligent, but more important[ly], well-rounded, ... plac[ing] a high value on ethics, morals and sportsmanship." By 1923, Deerfield had 140 students, including 80 boarders.

Boyden kept Deerfield from closing a second time in 1923 when the town removed Deerfield from the public school system in favor of the brand-new Frontier Regional School in South Deerfield. When Deerfield was re-privatized, the headmasters of Exeter, Taft, and Andover raised $1.5 million from their own alumni to save Deerfield from closing its doors. They also boosted Deerfield's enrollment by referring students that they had expelled to Boyden, who had reportedly established a reputation for rehabilitating such students.

Boyden may have welcomed the change because "Deerfield's rising population of immigrant Polish farmers" conflicted with his desire "to maintain the school as a Yankee institution"; he told a colleague that Deerfield needed a boarding department "to help settle the Polish problem." However, Exeter principal Lewis Perry—a personal friend of Boyden's—pushed back against the suggestion that Boyden was uninterested in educating Poles, writing that Boyden had "put a good many Polish boys and girls" through Deerfield.

As Deerfield grew more prominent, it moved away from its public-school foundation. Academic James McLachlan said that Boyden built "an essentially new and different institution on a moribund foundation." In Boyden's early years, Deerfield "w[as] comparatively inexpensive, drew [its] students from a broader social spectrum, and imposed a less Victorian regimen" than Episcopal Church schools such as St. Paul's, Groton, and Kent. By 1928, 30 out of Deerfield's 185 students were on scholarship, and as a further democratizing measure, the scholarship students' identities were kept secret. However, the academy's rising reputation also attracted the attention of major donors from around the country, including Nelson Rockefeller and John Gideon Searle, who sent their children to Deerfield. By 1940, Deerfield was charging higher tuition than even St. Paul's and Groton, and as many as 75% of Deerfield students had attended private middle schools. The latter fact displeased Boyden, and by the 1960s the academy boasted that 75% of its incoming students had attended a public school. Deerfield also discontinued coeducation in 1948, after educating girls for nearly 150 years.

Boyden retired in 1968. When he died in 1972, the New York Times wrote that he had taken over "a dying village institution and made it a notable preparatory school," and that he was "the best known American headmaster of his times."

=== Modern era ===
David M. Pynchon was appointed headmaster after Boyden, serving from 1968 to 1979. He was succeeded by Robert Kaufmann, who readmitted girls to Deerfield in 1989 after a 41-year absence. At the time, Deerfield was renowned as "the last of the big New England all-male prep schools" (most of its peer schools began admitting girls in the 1960s and early 1970s), and the all-male student body protested the decision when it was announced.

Eric Widmer '57 served as headmaster from 1994 to 2006. He stepped down in June 2006 to found King's Academy in Madaba, Jordan, a school backed by Deerfield alumnus King Abdullah II of Jordan, and partially inspired by the King's years at Deerfield in the late 1970s. Deerfield then tapped Andover dean Margarita Curtis as its first female Head of School. During her thirteen years at Deerfield, the endowment increased by $250 million and the academy spent $140 million on new buildings and renovations. The current head of school is John P.N. Austin, the former head of school at King's Academy.

The academy has maintained its strong reputation in the 21st century. It has been described as an "elite boarding school" by The New York Times, "one of the nation's ... most elite boarding schools" by the Boston Globe, and "an elite private school" by the Associated Press.

Deerfield's admission rate was 17% in 2024. In previous years it has been as low as 13%. The academy's 650 students come from 32 states and 42 countries. 17% of students are international, and 44% identify as students of color.

=== Sexual abuse cases ===
In 2004 an alumnus revealed to Deerfield's then-headmaster Eric Widmer that he had been sexually abused in the winter of 1983 by faculty member Peter Hindle. Widmer responded sympathetically but did not press for details. A parent had previously raised concerns about Hindle to the academy in the 1980s, and Deerfield had responded with written and verbal warnings. In 2012, the alumnus raised the matter again, this time with the new headmaster Margarita Curtis, who he says "displayed clear moral authority and offered unconditional support from the start."

An investigation by the academy's lawyers confirmed the allegations and uncovered more: In late March 2013 the academy published information that two former faculty members had engaged in multiple sexual contacts with students: Peter Hindle (who taught at Deerfield from 1956 to 2000), and Bryce Lambert (who retired in 1990 and died in 2007). The school stripped Hindle's name from an endowed mathematics teaching chair and a school squash court, and barred him from campus events. A subsequent criminal investigation by the District Attorney's office revealed that at least four teachers—three deceased and one still alive—had engaged in sexual conduct considered "criminal in nature" with students extending back into the 1950s. Their deaths, and the statute of limitations, precluded criminal charges.

== Finances ==
=== Tuition and financial aid ===
In the 2024–25 school year, Deerfield charged boarding students $74,440 and day students $53,860. 40% of the student body was on financial aid, and the average boarding aid grant was $60,850 (i.e., 82% of the total cost of attendance). 48 students (7.4% of the student body) were on full scholarships.

In September 2024, Deerfield announced that going forward, domestic students with household incomes under $150,000 would attend Deerfield for free, and domestic students with household incomes under $500,000 will have their tuition capped at 10% of household income. The Wall Street Journal noted that $150,000 was "almost double the median U.S. household income" at the time. Although this policy does not apply to international students, Deerfield commits to meet 100% of an admitted international student's demonstrated financial need. However, at Deerfield (as with many boarding schools), requesting financial aid may affect an applicant's chances of admission. In 2024, the head of school stated that Deerfield is "moving fast in [the] direction" of need-blind admissions.

=== Endowment and expenses ===
Deerfield's financial endowment stands at $920 million as of September 2024. In its Internal Revenue Service filings for the 2021–22 school year, Deerfield reported total assets of $1.17 billion, net assets of $1.07 billion, investment holdings of $829.9 million, and cash holdings of $33.5 million. Deerfield also reported $61.6 million in program service expenses and $13.4 million in grants (primarily student financial aid).

Deerfield's endowment has rapidly increased in recent years. From December 2018 to June 2022, the endowment increased from $590 million to $791 million. In 2022, Deerfield announced that Televisa vice-chairman Rodolfo Wachsman '53 had left Deerfield $80 million in his will; it is the largest donation in the academy's history.

== Academics ==
=== Curriculum ===
Deerfield follows a trimester system, in which the school year is divided into three academic grading periods. Deerfield students take a full liberal arts curriculum, including English, history, foreign language, mathematics, laboratory science, visual and performing arts, and philosophy and religion. However, required courses are kept at a minimum to allow students to take more courses in the subjects that interest them most.

Most courses last the entire year, but some can last for one to two terms. The required course load is five graded courses per term, but students may petition the Academic Dean to take a sixth graded course if desired. There are no Saturday classes, and classes are held from Monday to Friday, typically from 8:30 am to 2:50 pm. On Wednesdays, classes end at 12:30 pm to accommodate athletic events, as well as to provide more time for clubs and community service.

Deerfield does not rank students. Academic work is graded on a scale where the minimum passing grade is 60 and the median grades are between 85 and 90. A trimester average of 90.0 or above garners Honors distinction, whereas a trimester average of 93.0 or above garners High Honors distinction.

=== Test scores ===
The Class of 2023's average combined SAT score was 1382 and its average combined ACT score was 31. Although Deerfield no longer offers Advanced Placement courses except in math and the arts, in the 2022–23 school year, students took 680 AP exams (for reference, there were 185 juniors and 162 seniors at Deerfield that year) and passed 93% of them.

== Campus ==
=== Academic facilities ===
- The Arms Building houses the English department. It was designed by Charles Platt in 1933 and donated by Jennie Maria Arms Sheldon.
- The Boyden Library is a three-story library that originally opened in 1968 and was named in honor of former headmaster Frank L. Boyden and his wife Helen Childs Boyden. The library was renovated in 2015. After renovations, the Boyden Library now houses the College Advising Office, as well as the Academic Dean's Office. The library also houses the Center for Service and Global Citizenship (CSGC). It also contains an open Innovation Lab, which allows students to construct objects of their own design.
- The Hess Center for the Arts was renovated in 2014 and contains facilities for the visual and performing arts. The Hess Center contains the Hess Auditorium (often called the "Large Aud"), where weekly School Meetings are held. There are two galleries, the von Auersperg Gallery and the Hilson Gallery, which both exhibit student, faculty, and outside artwork. The orchestral and choral groups perform every trimester in the Elizabeth Wachsman Concert Hall. The Reid Black Box Theater is home to the theater program's productions.
- The Kendall Classroom Building houses the Language Department. It contains a language lab and a 160-seat auditorium (often called the "Small Aud") and is where the school newspaper and yearbook are written.
- The Koch Center houses the Math Department, Science Department, and Computer Science Department, as well as the Information Technology Services and Communications offices. The Koch Center contains a planetarium and the Garonzik Auditorium, which contains 225 seats. The Koch center also includes an astronomy viewing terrace and the Louis Cafe.
- The Main School Building was completed in 1931 and initially served as the classroom building for the entire school. The Main School Building houses the Admission and Financial Aid Office, and prospective students wait in the Caswell Library. After renovations in the 1980s, the building houses the History Department, Philosophy & Religion Department, and administrative offices.

=== Other facilities ===
- The Dining Hall is where Deerfield hosts its traditional sit-down meals.
- The 3-Floor D.S. Chen Health Center was opened in 2019 and is staffed 24/7.

=== Athletic facilities ===
- Fair Family Field is a turf field used for soccer and lacrosse.
- Headmaster's Field is a baseball field.
- Jamie Kapteyn Field
- Jim Smith Field is a turf field used for football and boys' lacrosse.
- Lower Level & South Division Field is a turf field used for field hockey, lacrosse, and soccer.
- Rowland Family Field is a turf field used for field hockey.
- The Tennis Courts is an 18 court tennis facility.
- The Deerfield Track is an eight-lane 10mm pour track field with a synthetic turf field on the inside.

=== Dormitories ===
Deerfield's student dormitories include Barton, DeNunzio, Field, Harold Smith, John Louis, John Williams, Johnson-Doubleday, Louis-Marx, Mather, McAlister, Pocumtuck, Rosenwald-Shumway, Scaife, O'Byrne Curtis (named for former Head of School Margarita O'Byrne Curtis), and Simmons (which replaced Dewey). Bewkes, formerly a dormitory, is now a faculty residence. Every dorm is single-sex, and a faculty resident lives on each hall. Juniors and seniors live together in the same dorms, whereas sophomores live in their own dorms. Since 2015, all 100 incoming ninth-graders have been housed together in the Ninth-Grade Village, which consists of two single-sex dormitories connected by a large common room.

== In books and popular culture ==
- In his book The Headmaster (1966), Deerfield alumnus John McPhee reviewed the life and work of headmaster Frank Boyden, whom he hailed as one of the last of the "magnanimous despots who ... created enduring schools through their own individual energies, maintained them under their own absolute rules, and left them forever imprinted with their own personalities."
- A sketch on Saturday Night Live titled “Collette at Deerfield Academy” featured Cheri Oteri as Collette Reardon attending a career-day event at the school.
- In the television series Mad Men, the character Pete Campbell was educated at Deerfield Academy.
- Alexander Payne's 2023 film The Holdovers was partially shot on Deerfield's campus. The film's fictional Barton Academy was founded in 1797, the same year as Deerfield Academy. The production team auditioned several Deerfield students for acting roles, and Deerfield student Dominic Sessa was selected to play one of the two male leads.
- In The Departed, Leonardo DiCaprio's character went to Deerfield before being expelled for hitting a gym teacher with a folding chair.
- John Gunther's book Death Be Not Proud (1949) discusses the long struggle of his son John "Johnny" Gunther Jr., a Deerfield student, against a deadly brain tumor. Johnny managed to complete his studies before dying less than a month after graduation. The book was later made into a 1975 television movie starring Robby Benson as Johnny Gunther.
- Novelist Hannah Pittard discusses her time at the school in her 2023 memoir We Are Too Many.
