= K. Dane Wittrup =

American engineer

K. Dane Wittrup is an American engineer who is the Carbon P. Dubbs Professor in Chemical Engineering and Biological Engineering at Massachusetts Institute of Technology as of 2017. He was elected to the National Academy of Engineering in 2012. His research has made advancements in protein engineering and biopharmaceutical engineering.
