= Frank Boyden =

- Born: Frank Learoyd Boyden; September 16, 1879; Foxborough, Massachusetts, US
- Died: April 25, 1972 (aged 92); Deerfield, Massachusetts, US
- Resting place: Laurel Hill Cemetery, Deerfield, Massachusetts
- Education: Amherst College
- Occupation: Headmaster
- Years active: 66
- Organization: Deerfield Academy
- Term: 1902-1966
- Predecessor: Robert Pelton Sibley
- Relatives: Helen Sears Childs (wife), John Carey Boyden (son), Elizabeth “Betty” Boyden (daughter)

Frank Learoyd Boyden (September 16, 1879 – April 25, 1972) was headmaster of Deerfield Academy from 1902 to 1968.

== Early life ==
Boyden was born at his family's homestead in Foxborough, Massachusetts. His maternal grandfather was a missionary in Japan and his great grandfather Otis Carey was the president of the Foxborough Bank and the Foxboro Branch Railroad.

== Headmaster of Deerfield Academy ==
Frank Boyden attended Amherst College, and graduated with the class of 1902. Soon after graduation Boyden secured a position as headmaster of Deerfield Academy, at that time a public school, largely financed by the town of Deerfield, with an enrollment of fourteen boys and girls. Boyden's style of leadership was characterized by strong personal relations with the boys, largely built through competitive sports teams. His mentorship of students became the characteristic elan of the school. Boyden kept his desk in the hallway of the Main Building so as to keep the pulse of the school. As headmaster, he became known for taking in students who had been expelled from other schools. Boyden, who had seen his work at the school as a steppingstone to law school, remained the school's headmaster for sixty-six years. Through the years Deerfield joined the ranks of elite private schools such as Exeter and Andover.

Boyden's efforts as headmaster resulted in a revival of the town of Deerfield. Henry and Helen Flynt were parents of a boy student at the academy. Boyden invited them to serve on the school's board and later to participate in town improvement efforts. The Flynts purchased and renewed numerous properties in the town of Deerfield.

His leadership was not without controversy. It is said that he converted the public school to a private school because he was alarmed by the changing demographics of the town of Deerfield which was seeing an influx of Polish immigration.

Boyden was replaced after his retirement in 1968 by David M. Pynchon.

== Personal life ==
Boyden married Helen Sears Childs on June 29, 1907. She was a 1904 graduate of Smith College, which awarded her a Doctorate of Humane Letters in 1934. Boyden enjoyed driving through the Deerfield Valley in one of his several horse-drawn buggies. He was a delegate to the Republican National Convention from Massachusetts in 1960.

== Legacy ==
An endowed chair, the Frank L. Boyden Professor of Psychology, exists at the University of Massachusetts Boston and is currently held by Jean Rhodes. Boyden Hall and Boyden Gym, on the campus of the University of Massachusetts Amherst, are named in his honor.

Boyden was profiled by John McPhee (Deerfield, Class of 1949) in The New Yorker in an article later expanded into a book, The Headmaster: Frank L. Boyden, of Deerfield.

The Archives and Special Collections at Amherst College holds some of his papers.
