= Hamill House =

Historic house in New Jersey, United States

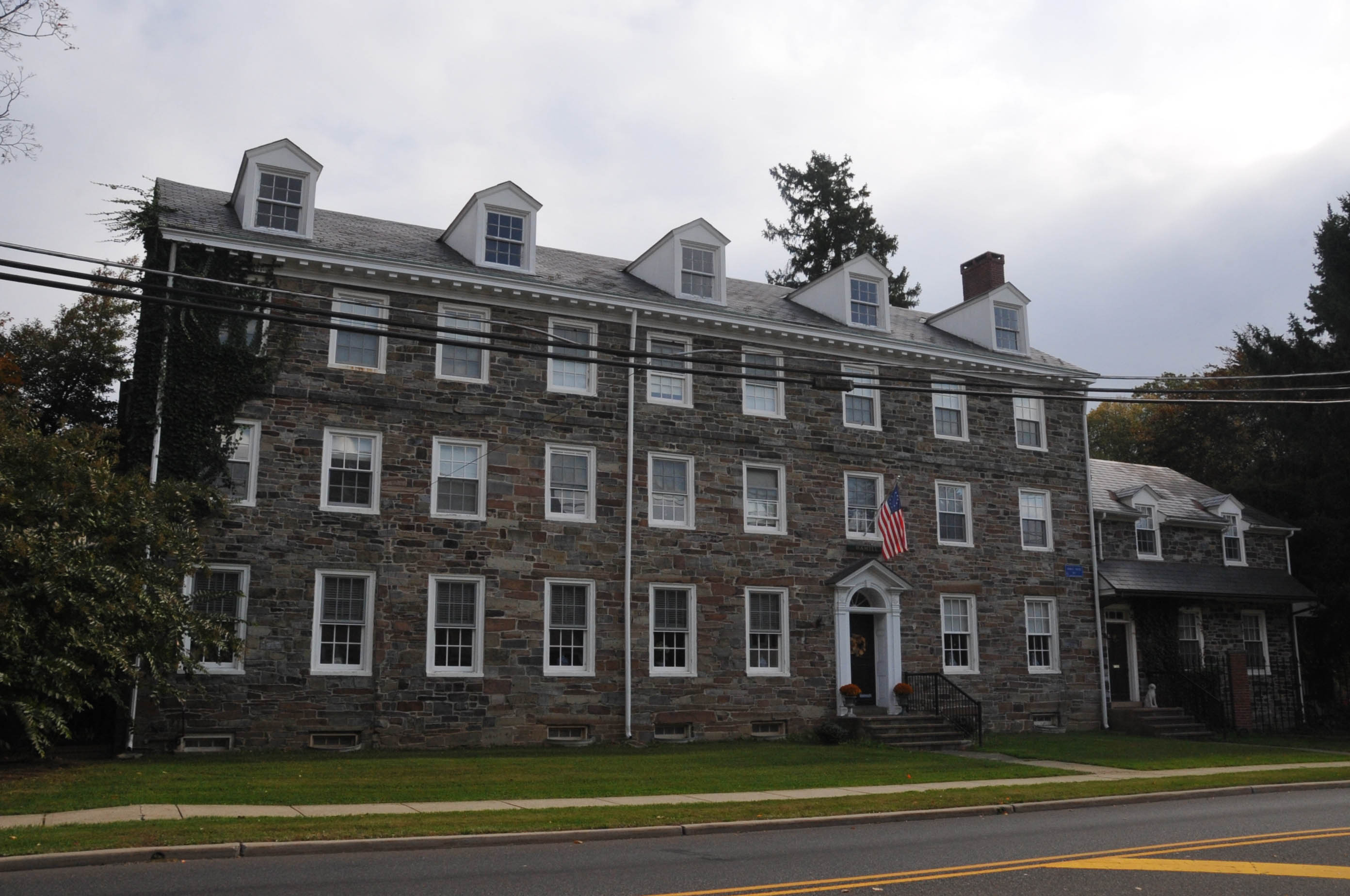
The Hamill House

The Hamill House is the original building on the campus of The Lawrenceville School in Lawrenceville section of Lawrence Township, in Mercer County, New Jersey, United States. Built in 1814 by the school's founder, Isaac Van Arsdale Brown, D.D. (1784–1861), the fieldstone schoolhouse is a national historic landmark and an example of Mid-Atlantic federal architecture. The house still fulfills the founder's original intent by serving as a residence hall for both students and faculty. In 1885, the structure was renamed Hamill House in honor of Samuel McClintock Hamill, D.D. (1812–1889) the Lawrenceville School's longest serving Head Master. It is the first of the "Circle Houses", residential houses named for their location on a landscaped circle designed to surround the house by the 19th-century landscape architect Frederick Law Olmsted.

== History ==
In 1810, the seventh minister of the Lawrenceville Presbyterian Meetinghouse, Isaac Van Arsdale Brown, made plans to build an academy to prepare young men for Princeton. Brown refused to let the War of 1812 divert him from his goal. Despite the uncertain times, he gathered sufficient funds to build a long stone schoolhouse in the federal style. When Brown's new edifice was completed, it became the town's first public building housing the Head Master, many of his pupils, and their classroom. The house has been in continuous operation as a residence hall since it opened in 1814. It was later named for the third Head Master of the school, the reverend Samuel McClintock Hamill, an accomplished Presbyterian clergyman, educator, State Superintendent of Public Schools, and a founder of the New Jersey Historical Society. When Samuel Hamill arrived at the school in 1837, he expanded the student body and built an additional classroom building. He remained at the school to become its longest serving Head Master. In 1885, the Lawrenceville School adopted the house system, a traditional feature of British schools and Frederick Law Olmsted, the founder of American landscape architecture and the designer of New York's Central Park, landscaped the Lawrenceville campus with a formal circle at its heart. In the same year, minor alterations were made to the house so that it would have a main entrance on Olmsted's Circle and the first of the Victorian red brick houses surrounding it (Griswold, Woodhull, Cleve, and Dickinson) was erected. The motto of the Hamill House is: "E tenui casa saepe vir magnus exit." or "Often a great man emerges from a humble cottage."

== Football Tradition ==
Hamill House played a role in the early development of high school football in America. Varsity and house football at Lawrenceville School began at Hamill House in the decades after the American Civil War. The Circle houses at the school are members of the oldest active high school football league in America. Informal football games were organized by "Hamillites" as early as the 1870s and a formal league was created a decade later. Up through the 1891–92 school year, class football competitions were played rather than house games. House games began in 1892 and house colors, flags, and heraldry accompanied the earliest league play. Over the years individual house football traditions developed, including the annual rivalry game between the oldest Circle house (Hamill) and the youngest (Kennedy). Called the "Crutch Game," it continues to attract alumni, parents, and former housemasters who return for the game in large numbers every year.

== Lawrenceville Stories ==
Hamill House figures prominently in Owen McMahon Johnson novels: The Prodigious Hickey, The Tennessee Shad, The Varmint, Skippy Bedelle and The Hummingbird. Several of the books became early Hollywood films and in 1986 they inspired a PBS television miniseries featuring Edward Herrmann and Zach Galligan.

== Notable Hamill alumni ==
- Dierks Bentley, county music artist
- Michael Eisner, author, philanthropist, chief executive officer of The Walt Disney Company, and CNBC host
- Robert Francis Goheen, author, educator, U.S. Ambassador to India, and President of Princeton University
- Aldo Leopold, author, forester, professor of wildlife management at University of Wisconsin-Madison
- Huey Lewis, rock music artist, actor
- Horace Porter, Medal of Honor winner, U.S. Ambassador to France, brigadier-general, U.S. Army, personal secretary to President Ulysses S. Grant
- Hugh Lenox Scott, U.S. Secretary of War and Superintendent of the United States Military Academy at West Point
- Robert Walker Jr., actor
- Alfred Alexander Woodhull, surgeon, medical reformer, and brigadier-general, U.S. Army
