= Isabella de la Houssaye =

American lawyer (1964–2023)

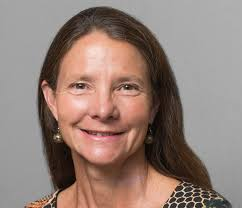

Personal information
- Born: New Orleans, Louisiana, U.S.
- Died: December 2, 2023 (aged 59)
- Education: Princeton University (BA); Columbia Law School (JD)
- Relatives: David W. Crane (husband); Cason Crane (son); David Crane (son); Bella Crane (daughter); Oliver Crane (son); Christopher Crane (son)

Isabella de la Houssaye (February 2, 1964 – December 2, 2023) was a lawyer, business owner, and endurance athlete who died after suffering from lung cancer for six years.

== Early life and education ==
De la Houssaye was born in New Orleans, Louisiana, and attended the Academy of the Sacred Heart in Grand Coteau, La. before matriculating to Princeton University. At Princeton, she majored in politics and wrote her thesis about Habib Bourguiba Jr.'s rule of Tunisia.

After graduation de la Houssaye moved to New York City where she attended Columbia Law School, serving as the first female editor-in-chief of the Journal of Transnational Law. She graduated in 1990.

== Career ==
de la Houssaye worked as an international finance lawyer at White & Case then moved to Lehman Brothers as an investment banker. After her international finance career she became the co-owner of Material Culture, a Philadelphia-based retail store and auction house.

== Cancer diagnosis and advocacy ==
In January 2018, de la Houssaye was diagnosed with EGFR+ non-small-cell lung cancer (NSCLC), although an athlete who did not smoke or drink alcohol and had regular health checkups. At the time of her diagnosis the cancer was at stage IV, having spread across her body from her lungs to her pelvis, spine, sacrum, adrenal gland, and brain. According to the American Cancer Society, the 5-year survival rate for stage IV NSCLC patients first diagnosed between 2012 and 2018 was less than 10%, although these numbers are increasing as new treatments are developed. While de la Houssaye suffered from cancer, she decided to raise awareness for lung cancer and founded Bike Breathe Believe, an advocacy group dedicated to educating people about lung cancer and providing support for patients.

== Endurance athletics ==
A lifelong outdoor enthusiast, de la Houssaye competed around the world in trail runs, triathlons, long-distance swims, and athletic endeavors of all types. Over the course of her life, de la Houssaye completed multiple Ironman triathlons, ultra-distance stage races, and climbed four of the Seven Summits. Additionally, she took her family on adventure travel excursions that ranged from riding horses across the Gobi Desert to hiking 500 miles (800 km) of Spain's Camino de Santiago pilgrimage. Many of these feats, including climbing Aconcagua, South America's tallest mountain, in 2019, were accomplished after her cancer diagnosis. In 2018, de la Houssaye competed in the Ironman World Championship race in Kona as one of the Ironman Foundation's athletes. A short list of her athletic accomplishments includes: over 100 marathons, including at least one in each US state, and on all seven continents, including The White Continent Marathon in January 2023, over two dozen Ironman Triathlons, and a trans-American bicycle ride from California to Florida.

== Personal life ==
De la Houssaye spent most of her life in the Lawrenceville section of Lawrence Township, Mercer County, New Jersey, with her husband David W. Crane and their five children. She died on December 2, 2023.
