= James Cameron Mackenzie =

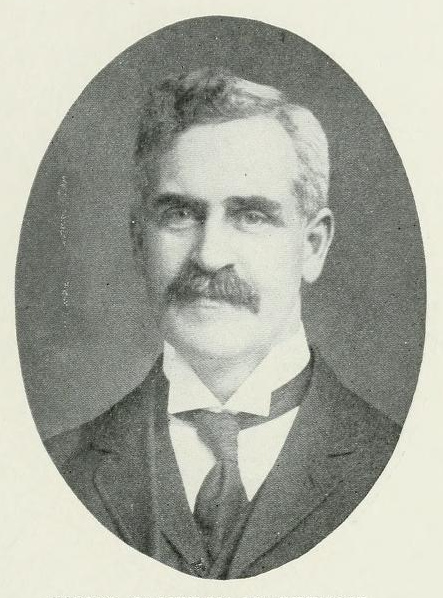
- Born: August 15, 1852; Aberdeen, Scotland
- Died: May 10, 1931 (aged 78); Dongan Hills, New York
- Education: Bloomsburg Normal School; Phillips Exeter Academy; Lafayette College; Princeton University
- Occupations: Educator, minister

James Cameron Mackenzie (1852–1931) was an American educator and Presbyterian minister, born in Aberdeen, Scotland.

== Early life and education ==
The son of Alexander and Catherine Mackenzie, he was born on August 15, 1852. He came to America when he was a boy (circa 1855–58), studied in the public schools of Wilkes-Barre, Pa., in the Bloomsburg Normal School in Bloomsburg, Pennsylvania, at Phillips Exeter Academy, and at Lafayette College, where he graduated in 1878. He then studied theology at Princeton.

== Career ==
Mackenzie organized in 1882 and was head master until 1899 of the Lawrenceville School for Boys in Lawrenceville School. After a few months abroad he was made director of Tome Institute, Port Deposit, Md. (1899). In 1901 he founded the Mackenzie School at Dobbs Ferry, N. Y., of which he was thereafter director. He was one of the three organizers, and president in 1897, of the Headmasters' Association, in 1898 was president of the Association of Colleges and Preparatory Schools of the Middle States and Maryland, and at the time of the Chicago World's Fair (1893) he served as chairman of the International Congress of Secondary Education.

He died in Dongan Hills, Staten Island on May 10, 1931.
