= Lawrence Township Historic District =

Historic district in New Jersey, United States

- U.S. National Register of Historic Places
- U.S. Historic district
- New Jersey Register of Historic Places
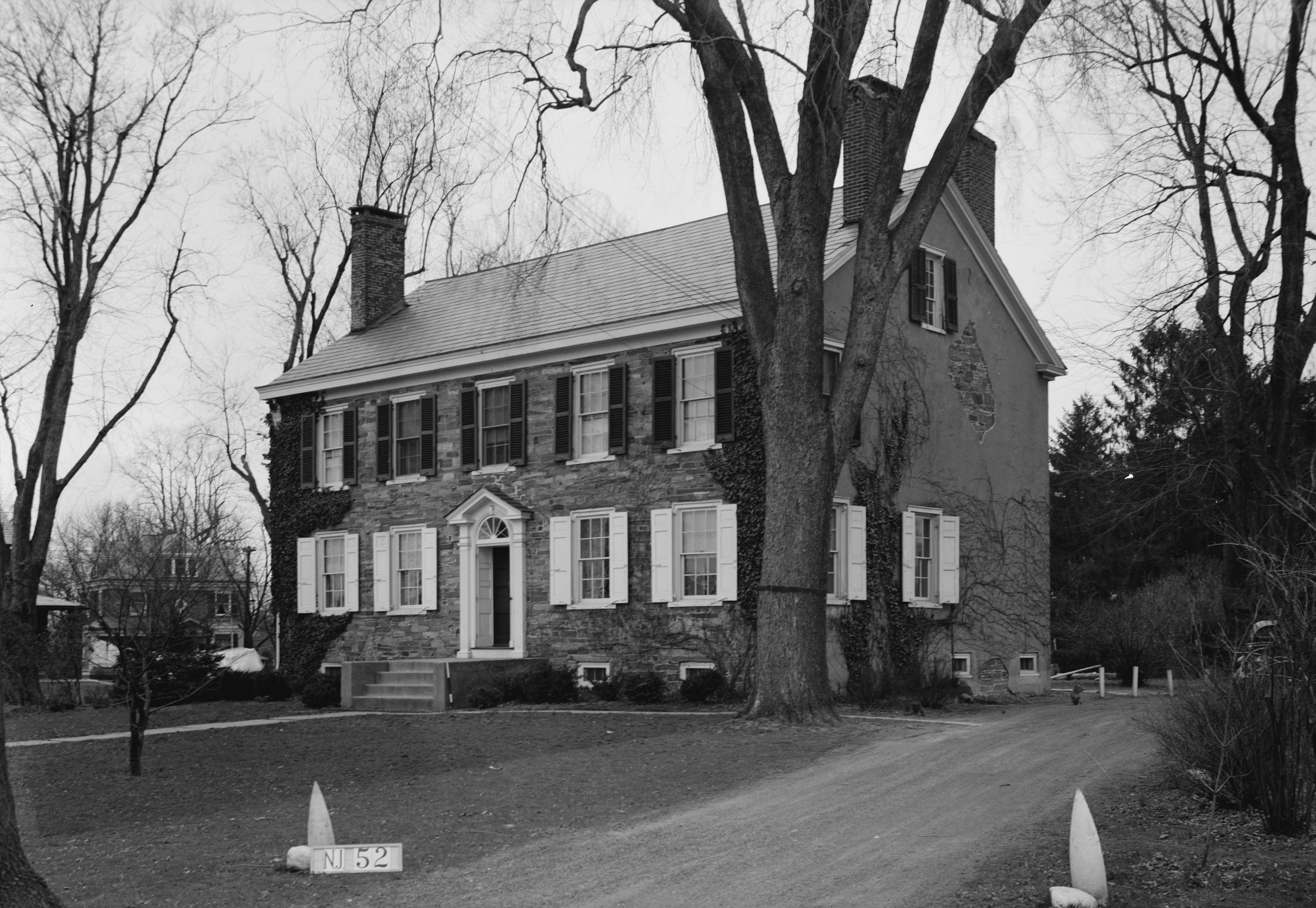
- Harmony Hall

- Location within Mercer County, New Jersey Location within New Jersey Location within the United States
- Location: Lawrenceville and vicinity, including both sides of U.S. 206.
- Coordinates: 40°18′1″N 74°43′12″W
- Area: 550 acres (220 ha)
- Architectural style: Colonial, Georgian, Federal, Victorian, and Mid 19th Century Revivals.
- NRHP reference No.: 72000799
- NJRHP No.: 1717

Significant dates
- Added to NRHP: September 14, 1972
- Designated NJRHP: July 31, 1972

The Lawrence Township Historic District is a 550-acre (220 ha) historic district encompassing the community of Lawrenceville in Lawrence Township, Mercer County, New Jersey, United States. It was added to the National Register of Historic Places on September 14, 1972 for its significance in architecture, landscape architecture, literature, military history, and transportation. The district includes 45 contributing buildings.

== Description ==
The district includes a number of buildings along US Route 206 (formerly King's Highway, as well as the Lincoln Highway), two early cemeteries associated with the Presbyterian Church of Lawrenceville (Est. 1697), and the Lawrenceville School. Prominent architects represented in the district include Peabody and Stearns, William Adams Delano, and Frederick Law Olmsted.

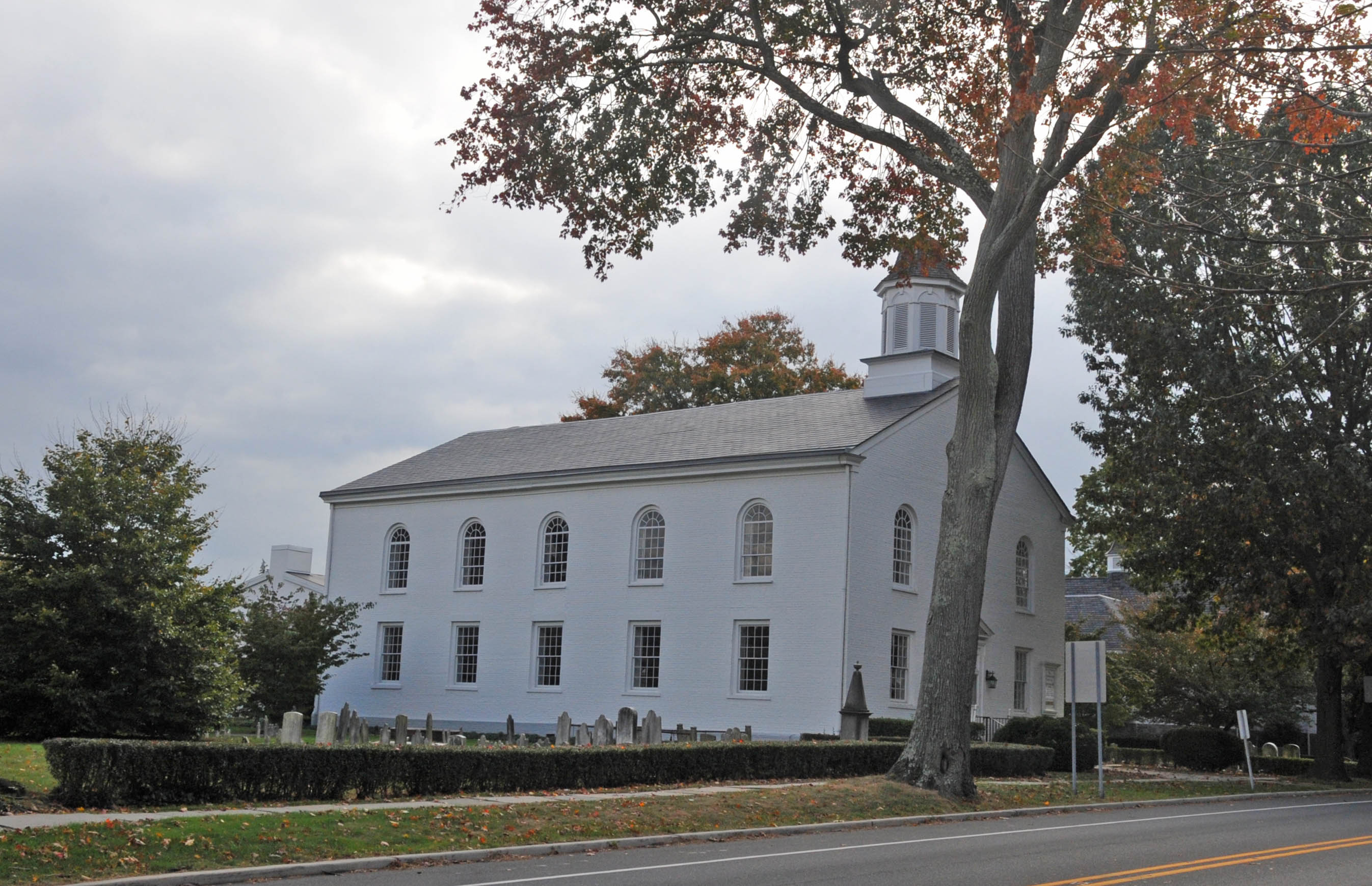
Presbyterian Church of Lawrenceville

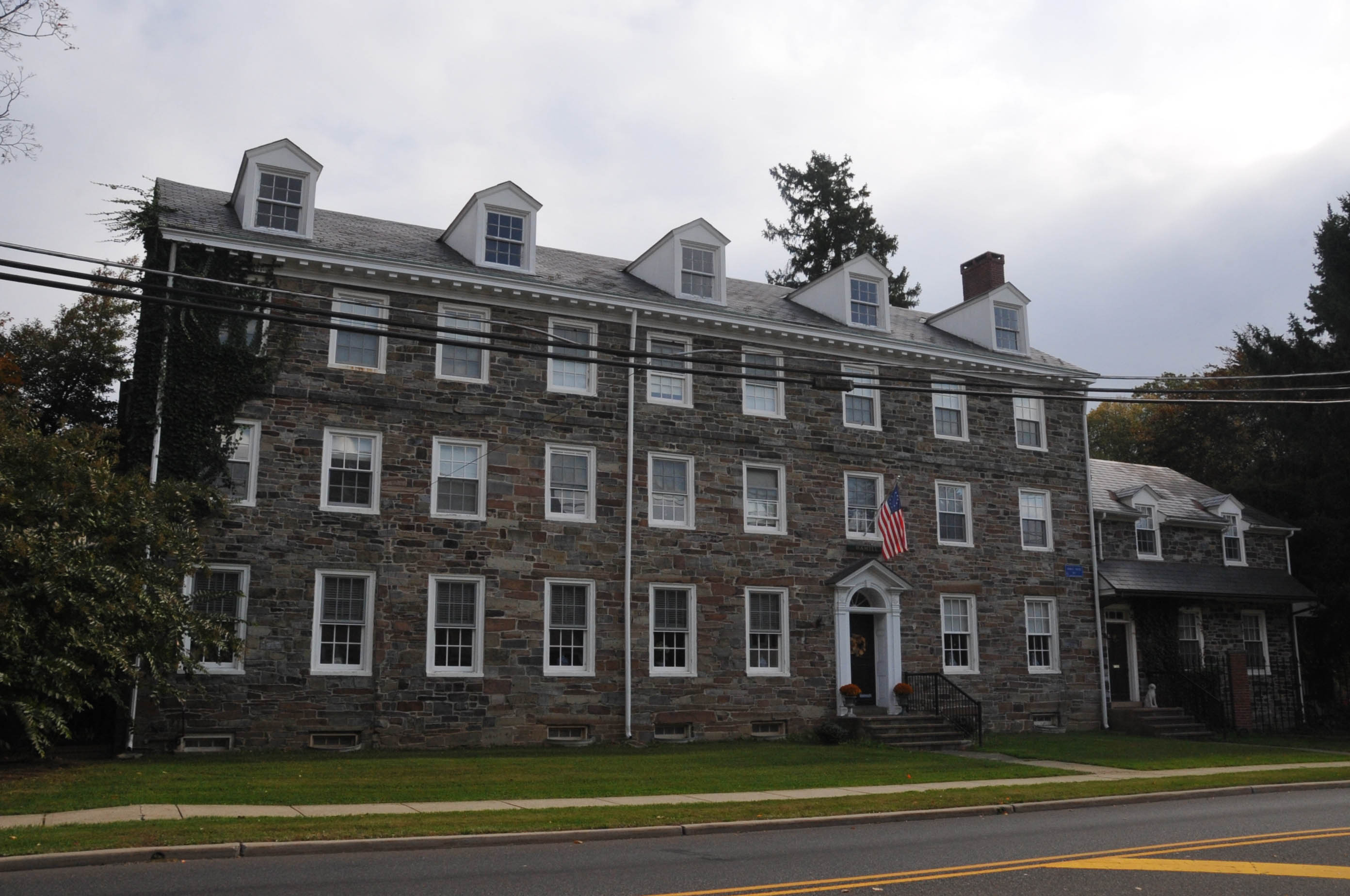
Hamill House

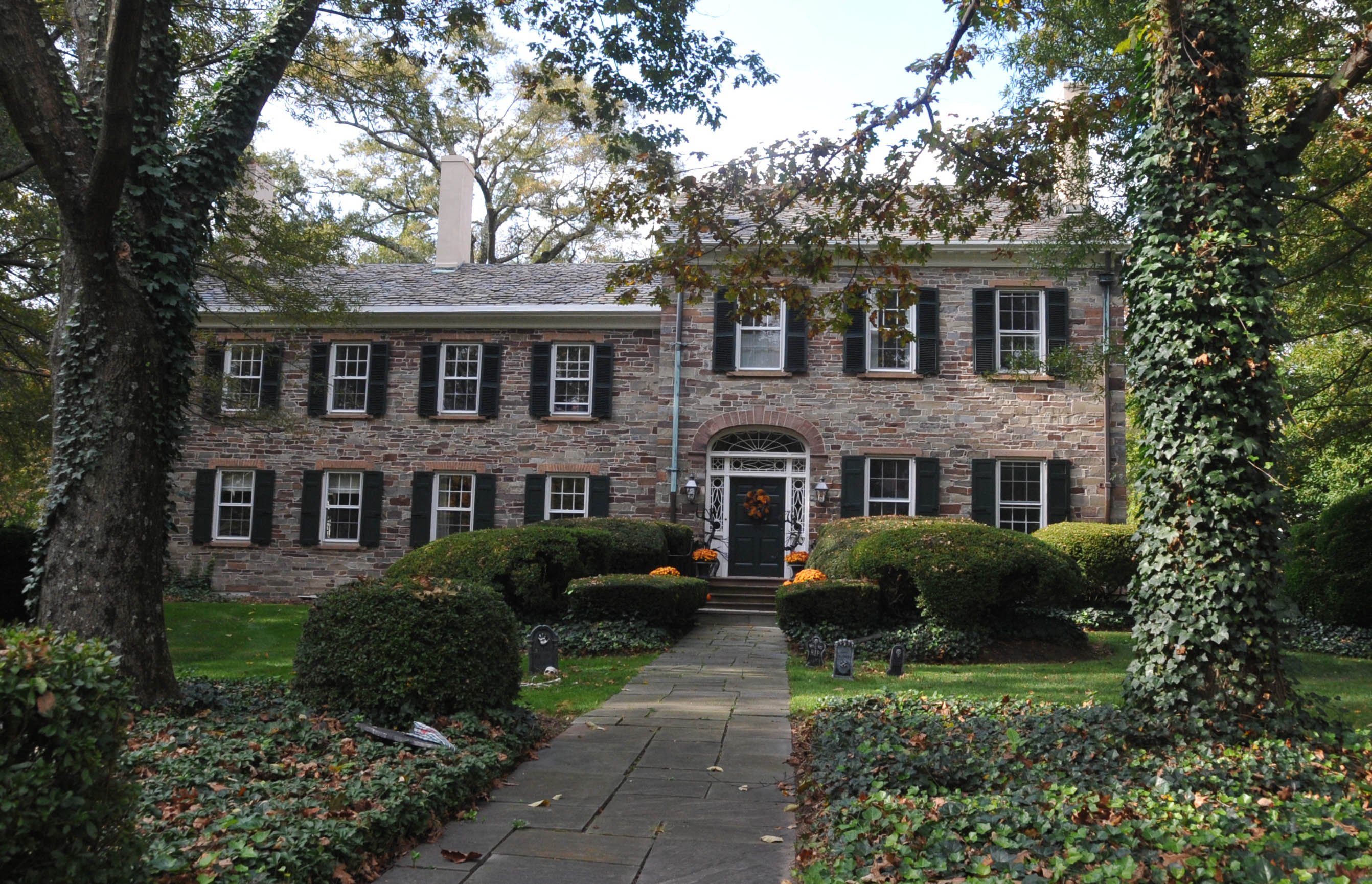
Theophilus Phillips House

== See also ==
- National Register of Historic Places listings in Mercer County, New Jersey
