= Oliver Crane =

American rower (born 1998)

Personal information
- Nationality: American
- Born: July 19, 1998 (age 26); Crowley, Louisiana, U.S.
- Height: 183 cm (6 ft 0 in)
- Relative(s): David W. Crane (father); Isabella de la Houssaye (mother); David Crane (brother); Bella Crane (sister); Cason Crane (brother); Christopher Crane (brother)

Sport
- Sport: Rowing
- Club: Princeton University

Oliver Crane (born June 19, 1998) is an American rower who formerly held the record of the youngest person to row solo across the Atlantic Ocean until his record was surpassed by Lukas Haitzmann in 2019.

== Personal life ==
Raised in the Lawrenceville section of Lawrence Township, Mercer County, New Jersey, Crane took a year off after graduating from the Peddie School and before he enrolled at Princeton University to undertake his transatlantic journey.

== Rowing ==
=== Solo Atlantic Row ===
On December 12, 2017, Crane started his 3,000-nautical-mile (5,600 km; 3,500 mi) journey from the Canary Islands to Antigua to become the youngest person to solo row across the Atlantic Ocean. The trip took Crane 44 days in which he lost 25 pounds (11 kg) in his efforts. Crane raised $73,000 for Oceana, an ocean conservation advocacy organization and HomeFront, a New Jersey charity that helps the homeless. Crane completed his journey in a 23-foot (7.0 m) vessel that was equipped with navigation systems, a water purifier, freeze-dried food, a radio, and solar panels.

== Other Expeditions ==
Crane has also climbed Mount Elbrus, Mount Kilimanjaro, and Mount Washington.
