= Cason Crane =

American mountain climber (born 1992)

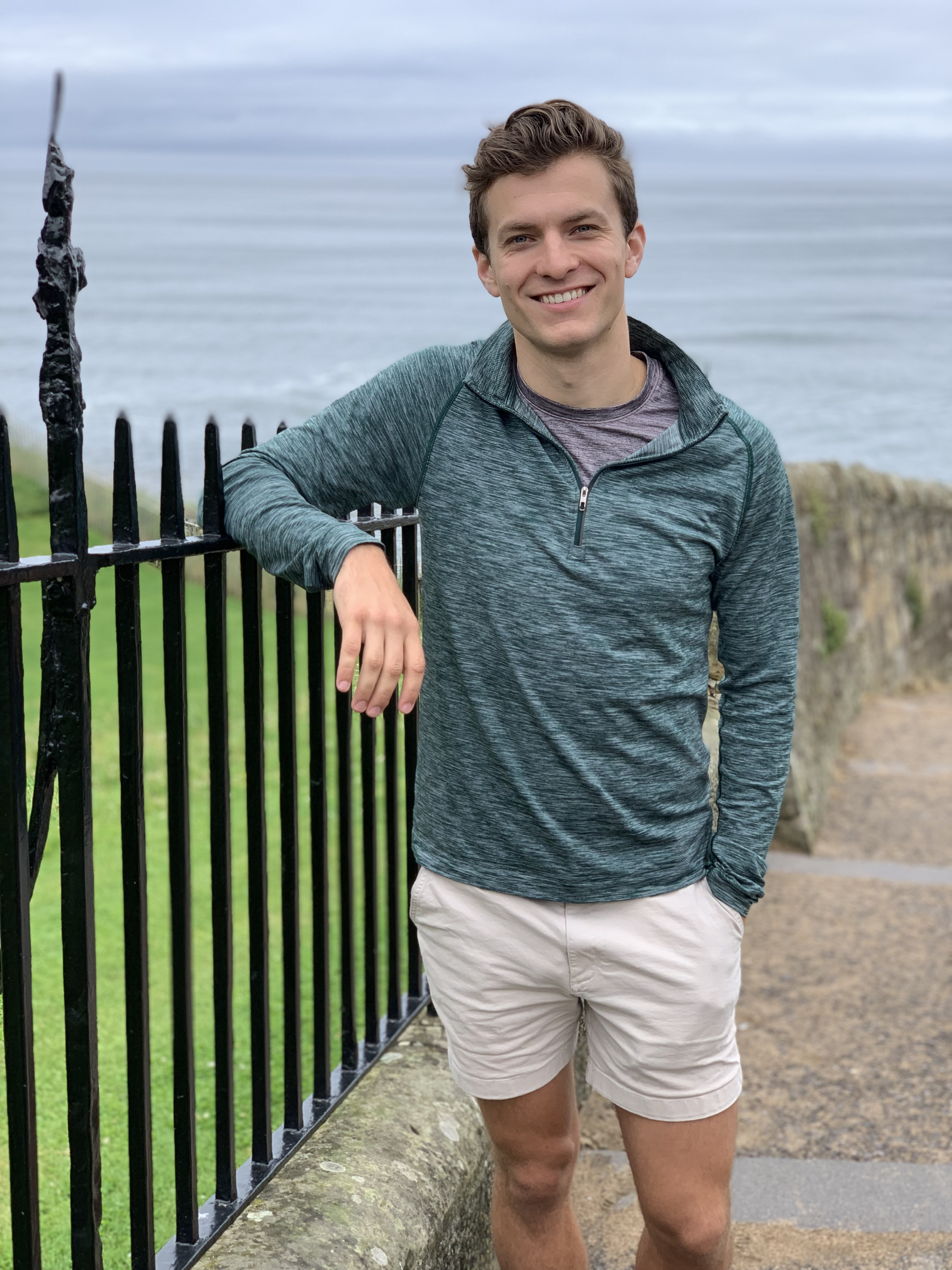
- Crane in July 2019

Personal information
- Nationality: American
- Born: December 2, 1992 (age 33)
- Education: Choate Rosemary Hall (2011); Princeton University (2017)
- Relatives: David W. Crane (father); Isabella de la Houssaye (mother); David Crane (brother); Bella Crane (sister); Oliver Crane (brother); Christopher Crane (brother)

Climbing career
- Major ascents: Everest, Elbrus, Denali, Kilimanjaro

Cason Crane (born December 2, 1992) is an American entrepreneur and endurance athlete. In 2013, he became the first openly gay mountaineer to scale the Seven Summits. In 2023, he competed on season 1 of the USA Network competition show Race to Survive: Alaska with his sister Bella Crane, finishing in third place.

== Early life ==
Crane is the oldest of five children born to David W. Crane, the president of NRG Energy, and Isabella de la Houssaye, an international lawyer, in Mercer County, New Jersey.

His parents both engaged in endurance sports and motivated him and his siblings to join them as part of their challenging activities.

He lived in Hong Kong between the ages of one and six before returning to the Lawrenceville section of Lawrence Township, Mercer County, New Jersey. His younger brother Oliver Crane is an adventurer and rower.

=== Education ===
Crane attended Princeton Day School through his eighth grade year, along with the rest of his siblings. In 2011, he graduated from Choate Rosemary Hall, a private boarding school in Connecticut, where he competed in a number of sports. He came out as gay at the age of 14; both his parents and his school were supportive, although he experienced bullying by classmates on occasion. After deferring for two years to travel to Lebanon and Israel and climb the Seven Summits, Crane joined the Princeton University Class of 2017, majoring in history.

== Mountain climbing ==
Crane summited his first mountain, Mount Kilimanjaro, as a 15-year-old freshman in high school with his mother. He described it as a "gateway mountain" which piqued his interest in mountaineering. As a junior, following the suicides of Tyler Clementi and one of Crane's friends, he was inspired to raise awareness about suicide among LGBT youth through mountain climbing. This led him to start the Rainbow Summits Project, with the goal of climbing the Seven Summits—the highest mountains of each continent—in order to raise funds and awareness for the Trevor Project.

By the beginning of 2013, a year after starting the Rainbow Summits Project, Crane had successfully climbed five of the Seven Summits: Mount Kilimanjaro in Tanzania, Mount Elbrus in Russia, Cerro Aconcagua in Argentina, Carstensz Pyramid in Indonesia and Vinson Massif in Antarctica. On May 21, 2013, he reached the summit of Mount Everest in Nepal, guided by New Zealand climber Lydia Bradey, the first woman to summit Everest without using supplemental oxygen. Crane's successful ascent of Denali in July 2013 at the age of 20 marked his completion of the Seven Summits, making him the first openly gay man to have done so. By the completion of the project, Crane had raised US$135,000 for the Trevor Project.

In 2014, Crane served as the International Marshal at the Ottawa Capital Pride Parade in Canada.

More recently, Crane was a consultant at Bain & Company and founded cold brew company Explorer Cold Brew.
