= Lawrenceville School =

Prep school in Lawrenceville, New Jersey, United States

The Lawrenceville School

Location
- 2500 Main St, Lawrenceville, NJ 08648; Lawrence Township, Mercer County, New Jersey; United States; 40.29414°N 74.72494°W

Information
- Type: Private, independent, day and boarding, college-preparatory
- Motto: Virtus Semper Viridis ("Virtue Always Green")
- Established: 1810; 216 years ago
- CEEB code: 310680
- NCES School ID: 00869171
- President: Michael S. Chae
- Head of school: Stephen S. Murray
- Faculty: 107.8 FTEs
- Gender: Coeducational
- Enrollment: 802 (as of 2023–24)
- Student to teacher ratio: 7.4:1
- Campus: 700 acres (2.8 km^{2})
- Colors: Red and black
- Athletics conference: Mid-Atlantic Prep League; New Jersey Independent Schools Athletic Association
- Sports: Yes
- Mascot: Larrie the Bulldog
- Nickname: Big Red
- Rival: The Hill School
- Accreditation: Middle States
- Endowment: $632.9 million (as of July 22, 2021)
- School fees: $1,750
- Tuition: $82,710 Boarding $68,060 Day (2026–27)
- Affiliations: NJAIS; ESA; TSAO
- Website: www.lawrenceville.org

The Lawrenceville School is a private, coeducational preparatory school for boarding and day students located in the unincorporated community of Lawrenceville within Lawrence Township in Mercer County, in the U.S. state of New Jersey. Lawrenceville is a member of the Eight Schools Association and the Ten Schools Admission Organization.

As of the 2023–24 school year, the school had an enrollment of 802 students and 107.8 classroom teachers (on an FTE basis), for a student–teacher ratio of 7.4:1.

== History ==
=== 19th century ===
The Lawrenceville School was founded in 1810 as the Maidenhead Academy by Presbyterian clergyman Isaac Van Arsdale Brown. One of the oldest preparatory schools in the United States, it has had several names, including Lawrenceville Classical and Commercial High School and Lawrenceville Academy.

In 1883, the John Cleve Green Foundation purchased the school from its aging headmaster Samuel Hamill and renamed it The Lawrenceville School. Green, who had died in 1875, was born in the village of Lawrenceville and was one of Maidenhead Academy's original students. A merchant who amassed a large fortune investing in railroads, importing tea and textiles, and exporting opium to China. With no surviving children, much of his estate went to charitable causes.

The trustees of the Green Foundation, including Green's widow Sarah, brother Caleb, nephew Charles, and friend John T. Nixon, aimed to turn Lawrenceville into a college-preparatory institution "with a more elite student body." With $1.25 million to spend (approximately $40 million in 2024 dollars), they hired Presbyterian minister James Cameron Mackenzie to study the public schools of the United Kingdom, and later appointed him Head of School. Mackenzie's British-inspired innovations included Lawrenceville's house system, "the [first] small-unit housing plan ... in America." He argued that a "home-like atmosphere was better for an adolescent boy and made him a better student." Upon his return to the United States, the trustees commissioned a new campus from Frederick Law Olmsted and Peabody and Stearns, which has since been designated a U.S. National Historic Landmark District.

The 1883 reorganization of Lawrenceville successfully elevated the school's entire profile and turned it into nearby Princeton University's most reliable feeder school. Princeton president James McCosh had been searching for a Mid-Atlantic alternative to New England boarding schools, which he thought funneled their best students to New England schools such as Harvard. He used John Cleve Green's fortune to fill this gap. Green had been one of Princeton's most important donors; his great-great-great-grandfather Jonathan Dickinson had founded Princeton in 1746. Accordingly, the new Lawrenceville School was established "for the express purpose of preparing students for Princeton."

Lawrenceville was a large success; the school sent 20 students to Princeton in 1886 alone, and enrollment leaped from 112 students in 1883 to 362 by 1898. The relaunch marked the start of a large boom in the American boarding school industry.

=== 20th century ===
In the 1940s, the school was considered by members of the American upper classes to be "very sophisticated and very cosmopolitan."

In 1932, Lawrenceville sent 62 students to Princeton, nearly ten percent of the freshman class and more than the next two schools (Phillips Exeter and Mercersburg) put together. In the 1950s, the College Entrance Examination Board tested an early version of today's Advanced Placement program at Lawrenceville, Exeter, and Andover, with input from Princeton as well as Harvard and Yale.

In 1936, Lawrenceville adopted the Harkness system of seminar-based classes. Time magazine reported that Edward Harkness offered the school "a blank check" to adopt his preferred system, which Exeter had previously adopted in 1930.

When Ivy League schools refocused their admissions practices on academic excellence in the 1950s and 1960s, the admissions director at Yale University was R. Inslee Clark Jr., a former Lawrenceville faculty member.

Lawrenceville admitted its first African-American students, Lyals Battle '67 and Darell A. Fitzgerald '68, in 1964, one year after the longtime president of the board of trustees, an opponent of integration, stepped down. Upon their admission, the new board president remarked that Lawrenceville was the last major American boarding school to admit students of color. In 2024, the school renamed the atrium of the school gym (previously named for the earlier board president) to honor its first two black students. That year, 55% of the student body were classified as non-white.

Lawrenceville began admitting girls in 1987. In 1999, the student body elected its first female student body president, Alexandra Petrone; in 2003, Elizabeth Duffy was appointed the School's first female headmaster; and in 2005, Sasha-Mae Eccleston '02 became Lawrenceville's first alumna to win a Rhodes Scholarship.

=== 21st century ===
In 2001, The New York Times wrote that Lawrenceville was "[o]nce - and perhaps still - as much a symbol of the establishment as Far Hills or the Social Register," but was currently trying "to reinvent itself as an instrument of meritocracy rather than aristocracy." The school's admissions rate was 20.5% in the 2017-18 school year. Applications increased nearly 20% during the COVID-19 pandemic, "with part of the increase driven by Black applicants and families seeking financial aid."

In 2010, Lawrenceville set the world record for the largest custard pie fight.

=== Heads of school ===
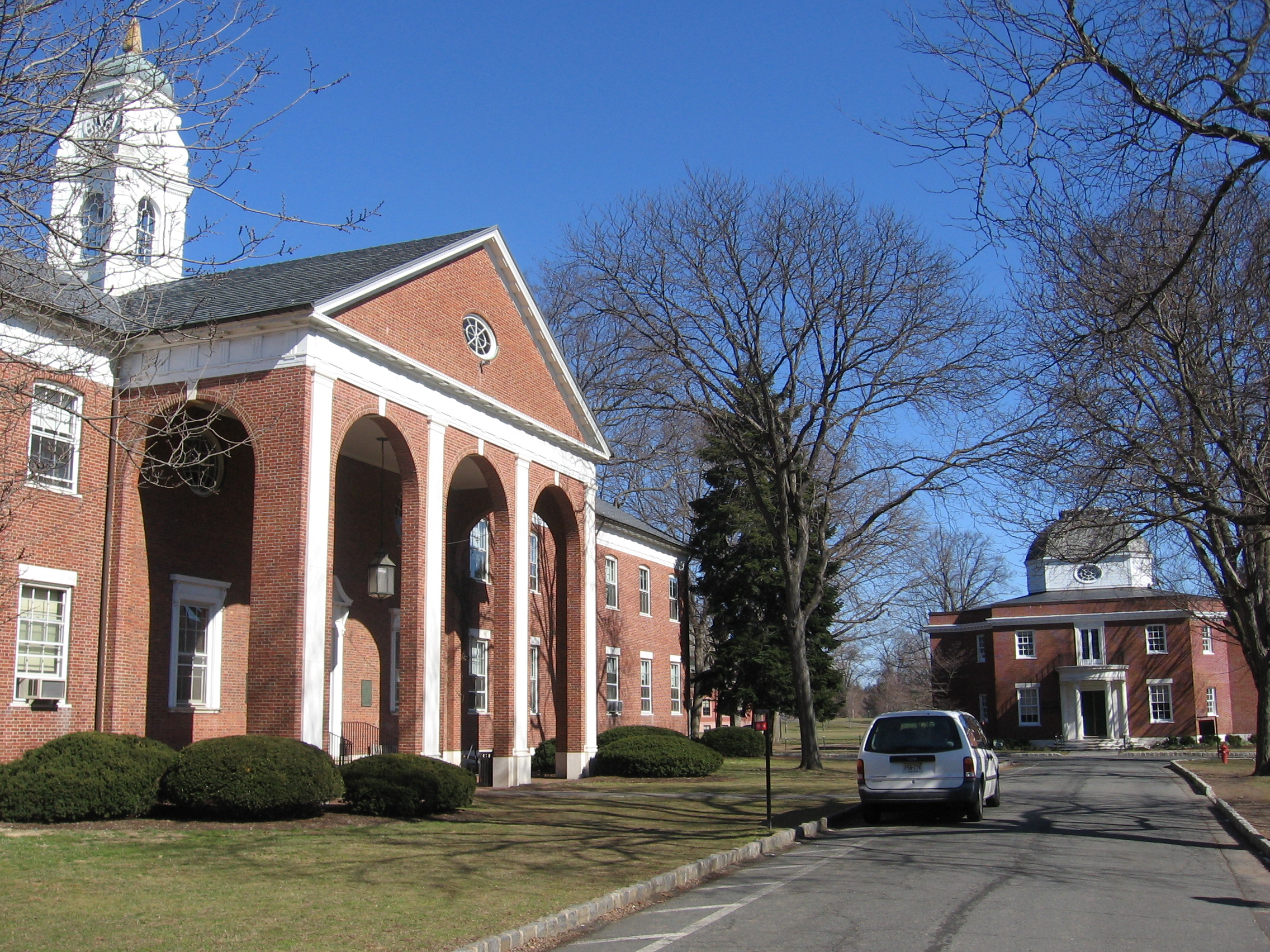
Fathers Building (foreground) and the Mackenzie Building (background; admissions) named for James Cameron Mackenzie, an early head of school

Heads of school include:

- Isaac Van Arsdale Brown, 1810–1834
- Alexander Hamilton Phillips, 1834–1837
- Samuel McClintock Hamill, 1837–1883
- James Cameron Mackenzie, 1883–1899
- Simon John McPherson, 1899–1919
- Mather Almon Abbott, 1919–1934
- Allan Vanderhoef Heely, 1934–1959
- Bruce McClellan, 1959–1986
- Josiah Bunting III, 1987–1995
- Philip Harding Jordan Jr., 1995–1996
- Michael Scott Cary, 1996–2003
- Elizabeth Anne Duffy, 2003–2015
- Stephen Sheals Murray, 2015–present

== Tuition and financial aid ==
Tuition and fees for the 2026-27 school year are $82,710 for boarding students and $68,060 for day students. From 2010 to 2014, Business Insider ranked Lawrenceville as America's most expensive private high school. However, the school commits to provide need-based financial aid covering 100% of an admitted student's demonstrated financial need.

In the 2023-24 school year, 34% of the student body was on financial aid, with an average boarding aid grant over $60,000 and an average day grant over $44,000. In the 2024-25 school year, Lawrenceville reported 189 families with boarding students on scholarship. 64 of these families had household incomes under $125,000/year; after financial aid, they paid an average contribution of $703. 36 families had household incomes over $350,000/year, with an average contribution around $36,000. The school did not provide corresponding statistics for day students.

== Endowment and expenses ==
Lawrenceville does not publicly report the size of its financial endowment. However, from 2016 to 2021, its endowment increased from $381.1 million to $632.9 million. In its IRS filings for the 2021-22 school year, Lawrenceville reported total assets of $1.06 billion, net assets of $937.7 million, investment holdings of $631.0 million, and cash holdings of $78.0 million. The school also reported $65.0 million in program service expenses and $15.5 million in grants (primarily student financial aid).

Lawrenceville has attracted several major donors in the 21st century. In 2017, Alibaba founder Joseph C. Tsai '82 and his wife Clara Wu '82, contributed the largest gift in school history. The exact size of the gift was undisclosed, but it was larger than the $60 million donation from Janie and Henry Woods in 2007.

== Campus ==
- Lawrenceville School
- U.S. National Register of Historic Places
- U.S. National Historic Landmark District
- U.S. Historic district – Contributing property
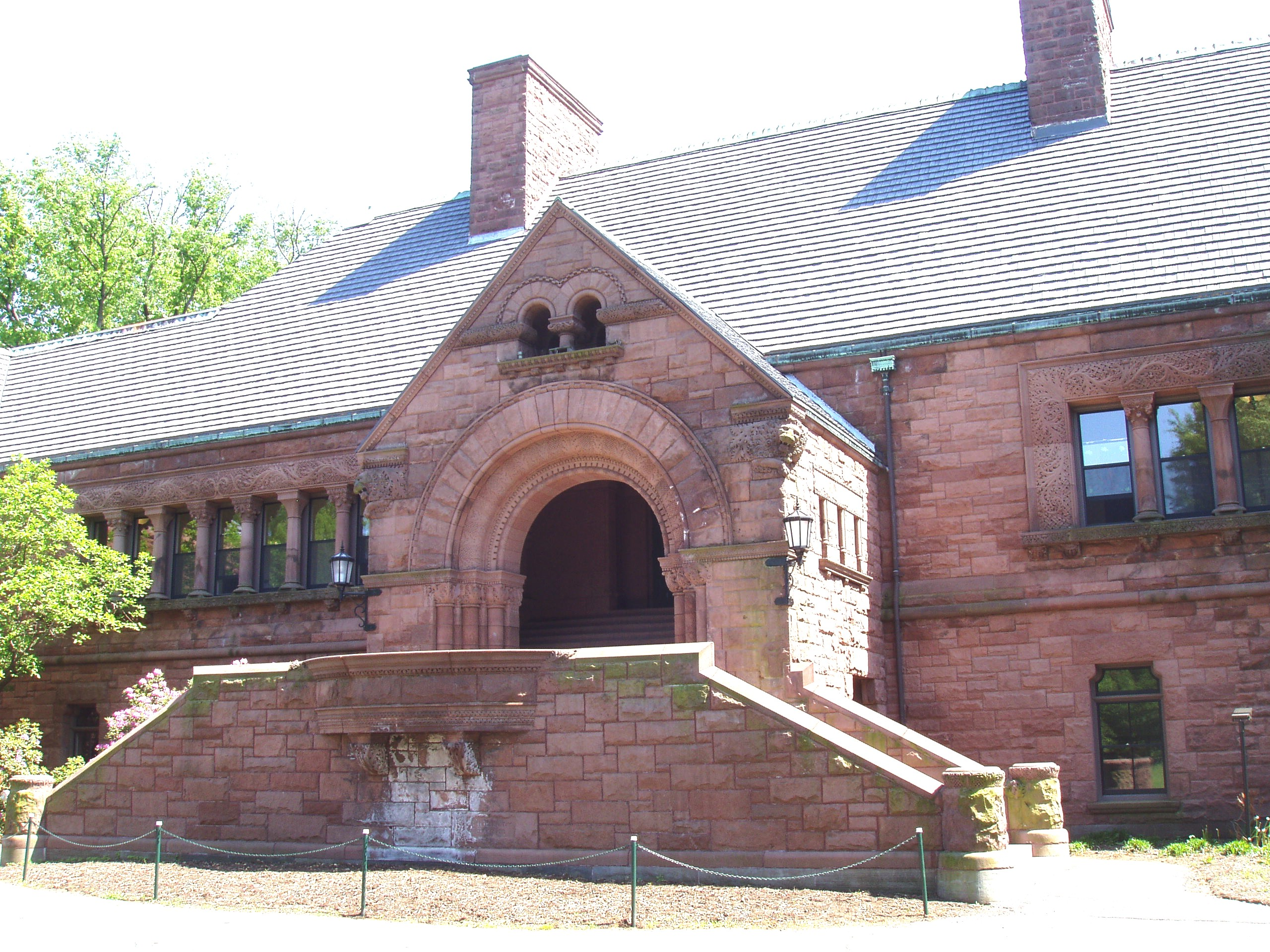
- Woods Memorial Hall at the Lawrenceville School

- Location within Mercer County, New Jersey Location within New Jersey Location within the United States
- Location: Main Street, Lawrenceville, New Jersey
- Coordinates: 40°17′42″N 74°43′45″W
- Area: 17.74 acres (7.18 ha)
- Architect: Peabody & Stearns; Frederick Law Olmsted
- Architectural style: Queen Anne, Romanesque
- Part of: Lawrence Township Historic District (ID72000799)
- NRHP reference No.: 86000158

Significant dates
- Added to NRHP: February 24, 1986
- Designated NHLD: February 24, 1986
- Designated CP: September 14, 1972

Lawrenceville has a self-contained campus, separated from central Lawrenceville by U.S. Route 206 (Main Street). The campus is a 15-minute drive from Princeton, New Jersey.

== Historic recognition ==
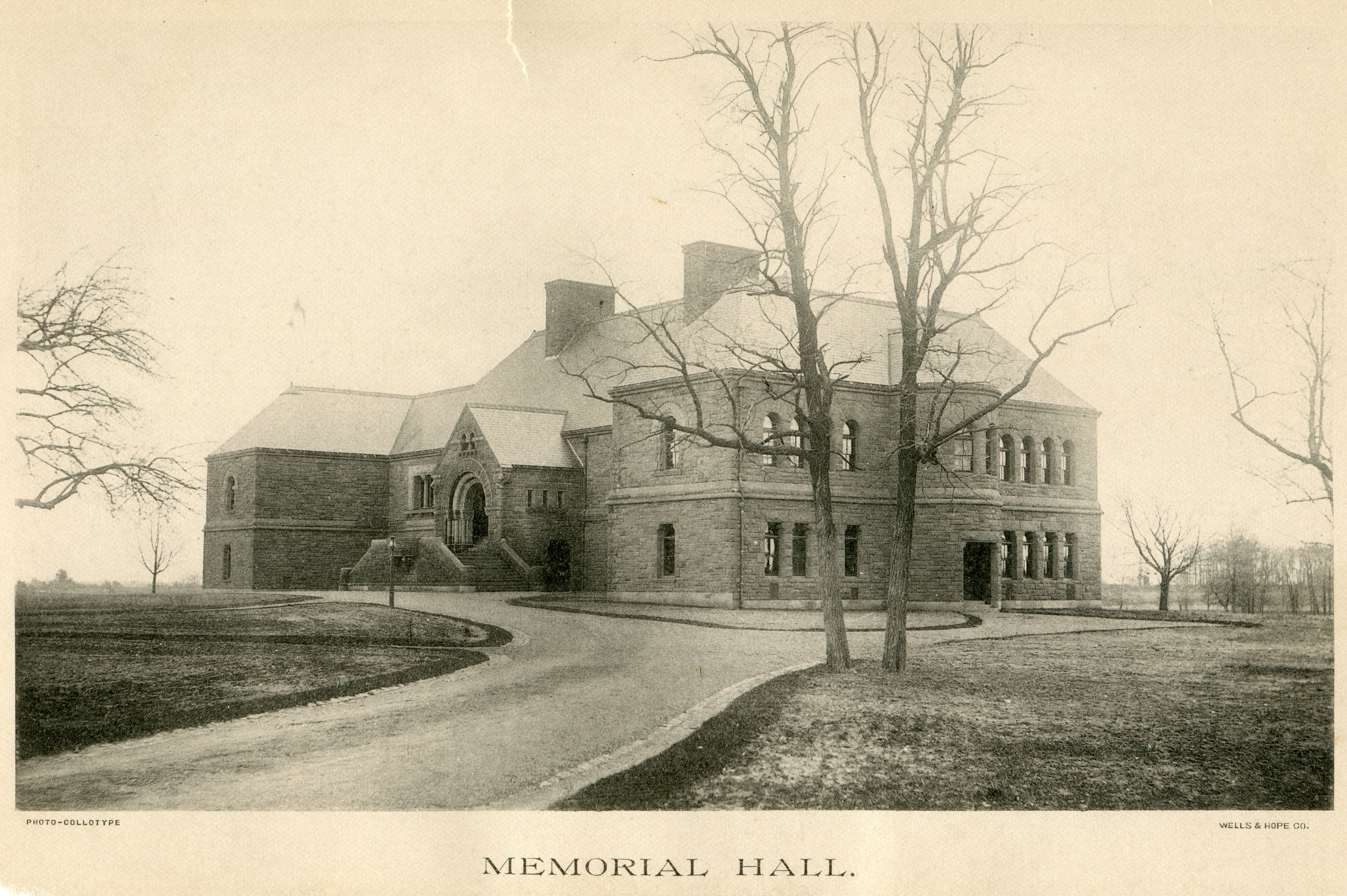
Woods Memorial Hall in 1886

In 1986, the old campus core of Lawrenceville School (built in 1884–85) was declared a National Historic Landmark. The landscape designer Frederick Law Olmsted planned the campus and grounds, and the Peabody & Stearns architectural firm designed the buildings, including Memorial Hall (now Woods Memorial Hall), which the National Park Service cited for the "richness of [its] materials" and "the high quality of the decorative details." The campus core also includes a gymnasium, the headmaster's house, the Circle House dormitories, and a chapel. The landmark covers 17.74 acres (7.18 ha); the present-day campus includes over 700 acres.

In 1972, the village of Lawrenceville, including parts of the school campus, was placed on the National Register of Historic Places, as part of the Lawrence Township Historic District.

== Residential life ==
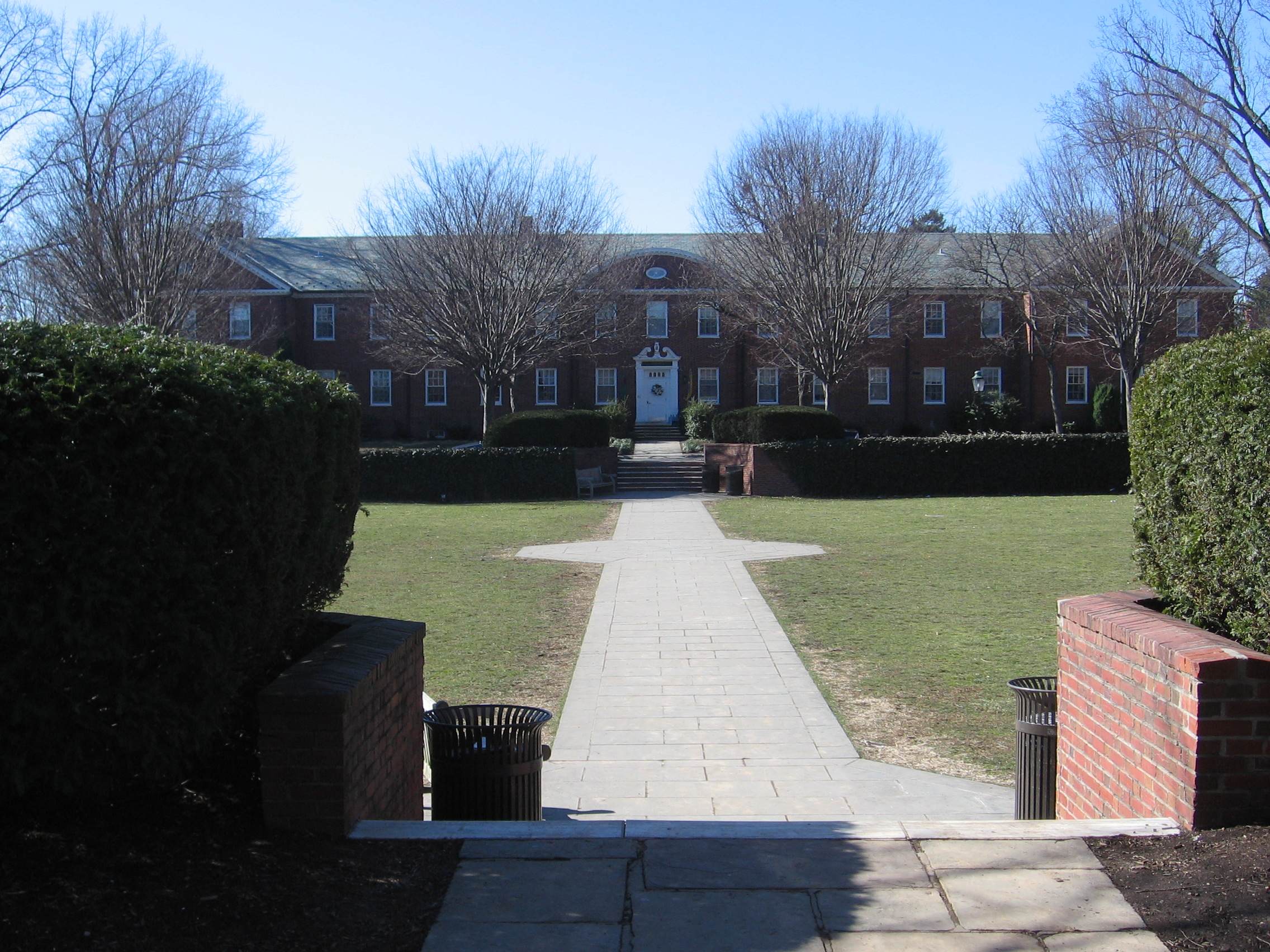
Dawes House, the freshman girls' dorm, split into the Cromwell and Perry Ross houses

Lawrenceville utilizes a house system, similar to many British schools. Students reside in four distinct groups of Houses – the Lower Houses for II formers (freshmen), the Crescent (girls) and the Circle (boys) Houses for III and IV Formers (Sophomores and Juniors respectively), and the V Form (Senior) Houses. Faculty members are also associated with each House, either as Heads of House or duty affiliates who support and monitor students of their assigned house.

Currently, there are two Lower Houses, Raymond for II Form boys and Dawes for II Form girls, along with six Circle Houses, five Crescent Houses, and four Senior Houses. The Circle Houses are Cleve, Griswold, Woodhull, Hamill, Kennedy, and Dickinson, while the Crescent Houses are Carter, McClellan, Stephans, Stanley and Kirby. There are two houses for Senior girls, Reynolds, and McPherson; V Form boys are housed mainly in the Upper House, with a few students in the much smaller Haskell House.

The Circle Houses were designed by Peabody and Stearns, as part of the original campus plan, and are part of Lawrenceville's National Historic Landmark. Four Crescent House dorms designed by Short and Ford Architects of Princeton, New Jersey, were opened in 1986. A fifth, designed by RMJM Hillier opened in 2010.

=== Facilities ===
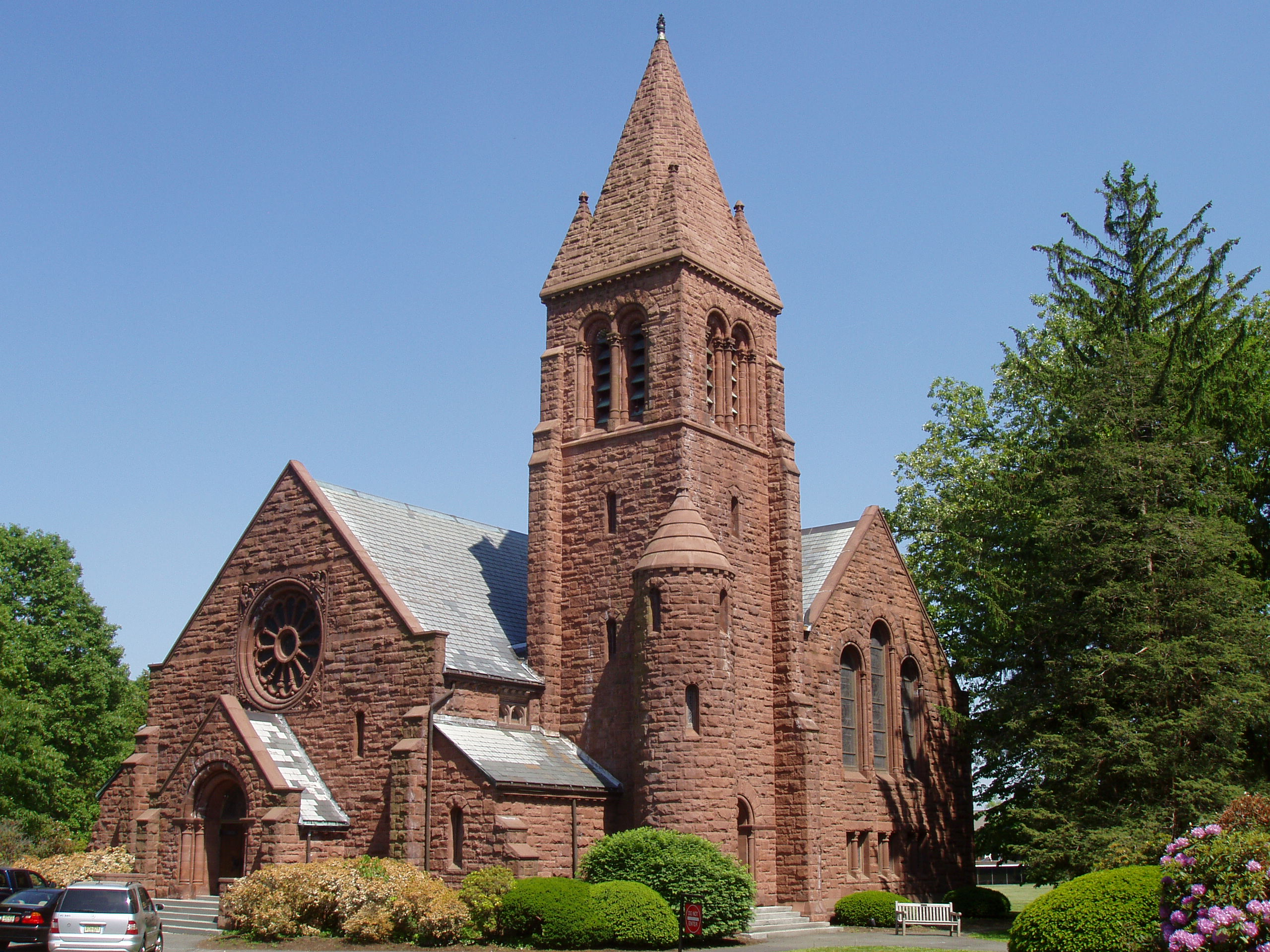
Edith Memorial Chapel

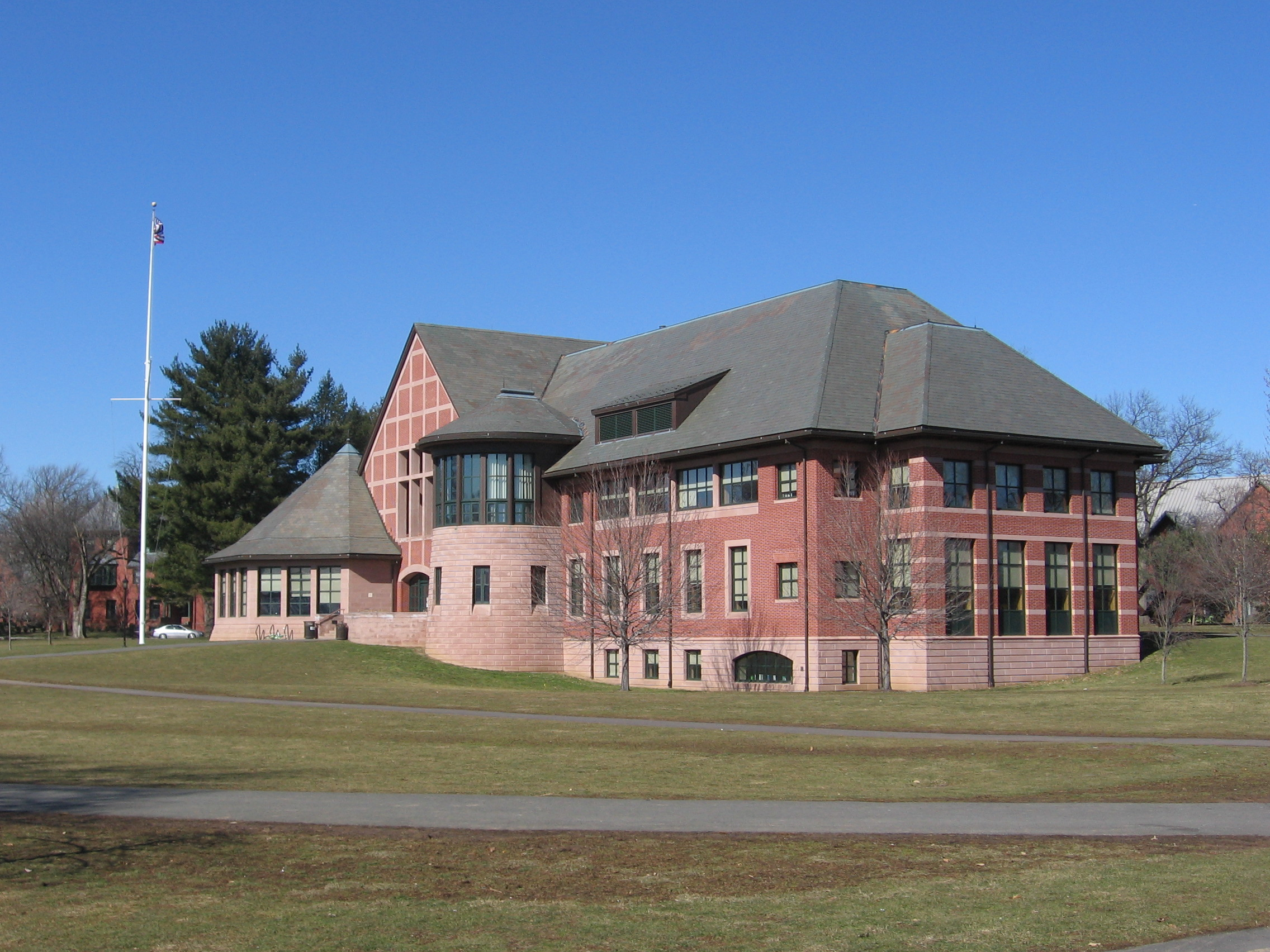
The Bunn Library

There are 38 major buildings on Lawrenceville's campus, including the Bunn Library, which has space for 100,000 volumes.

Lawrenceville has 18 athletics fields, a nine-hole golf course, 12 outdoor tennis courts, 2 1/4-mile (400 m) all-weather and indoor tracks, a hockey arena, a ropes course, and access to an off-campus boathouse. During the summer, Lawrenceville is a popular site for youth sports camps and several academic programs for students and teachers, including the New Jersey Scholars Program. The school recently finished building the Tsai Commons and Field House, which comprises a new dining hall, new community space, and additions to existing athletic facilities; this project was completed and opened for the first time in the 2024-25 school year.

In the spring of 2012, the school began to draw its energy needs from a solar farm, which consists of a nearly 30-acre, net-metered, 6.1-megawatt solar facility.

The school operates the Big Red Farm, a working agricultural facility with three greenhouses, 4 acres (1.6 ha) of farmland, 20 acres (8.1 ha) of pastureland for the school's sheep, chickens and pigs, and several honey-producing beehives.

== Affiliations ==
Lawrenceville is a member of the Eight Schools Association, a group of leading American secondary schools informally founded during the 1973–74 school year and formally established in 2006. Lawrenceville is also a member of the Ten Schools Admissions Organization. The school was formerly part of G20 Schools, an international group of secondary schools.

Lawrenceville is affiliated with The Island School in Cape Eleuthera, The Bahamas, to which it sends students for semesters abroad. Island School was founded by a former Lawrenceville teacher.

The school is accredited by the Middle States Association of Colleges and Schools.

== Publications ==
In the fall of 2014, L10 News, the school's weekly ten-minute newscast, was founded on Lawrenceville's YouTube channel and Facebook page.

Other student-run publications include The First Amendment, a monthly political magazine founded in 2010, The Ledger, a semesterly business magazine, LMAG, a semesterly fashion magazine, In the Margins, a Diversity magazine, The Contour, a newspaper on global issues, El Artículo, a Spanish publication, The Calliopean, a journal of literary criticism, and The Lit, a literary magazine published once a term, three times a year. The Lit was founded in 1895 by author Owen Johnson, who went on to write the Lawrenceville Stories. Annual student publications include The Lawrenceville Historical Review, the school's history periodical, Olla Podrida, the school yearbook; Lawrencium, the science research journal; and Prize Papers, a compilation of the best academic work in the English Department by that year's IV Form (junior) class. There is also a WLSR radio club.

=== The Lawrence ===
The school's weekly newspaper, The Lawrence, is the third oldest secondary school newspaper in the United States, after The Phillipian and The Exonian. The Lawrence has been published regularly since 1881. Students make up the editorial board and all decisions for the paper, consulting with two faculty advisors at their discretion.

The Lawrence has won numerous awards, including the Columbia Journalism Award in consecutive years. In 2019, The Lawrence also won an editorial award from Youth Journalism International. Notable contributors include sportswriter Bob Ryan in 1964 and businessman Joseph Tsai.

== Athletics ==
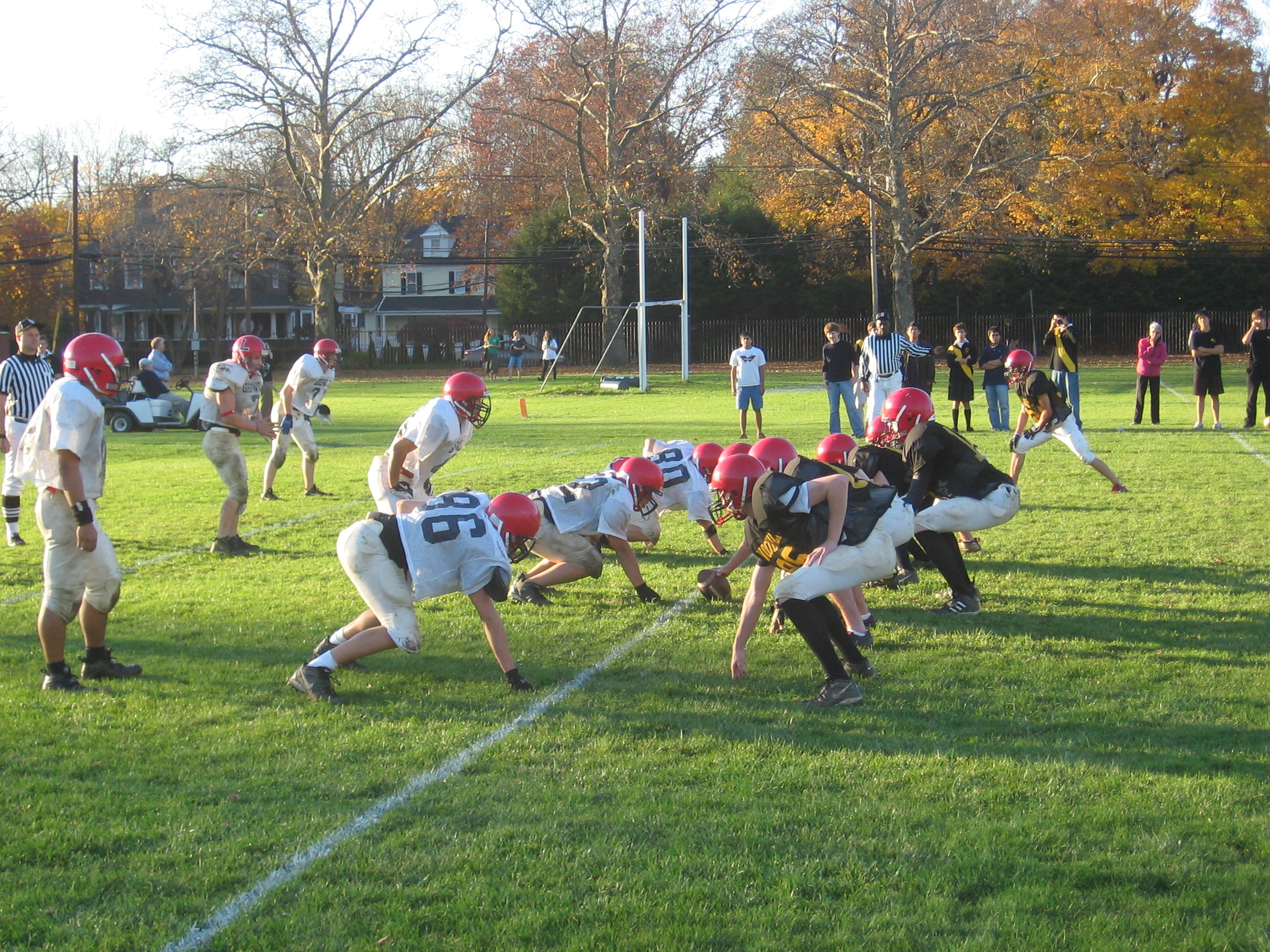
House football: Griswold vs. Woodhull

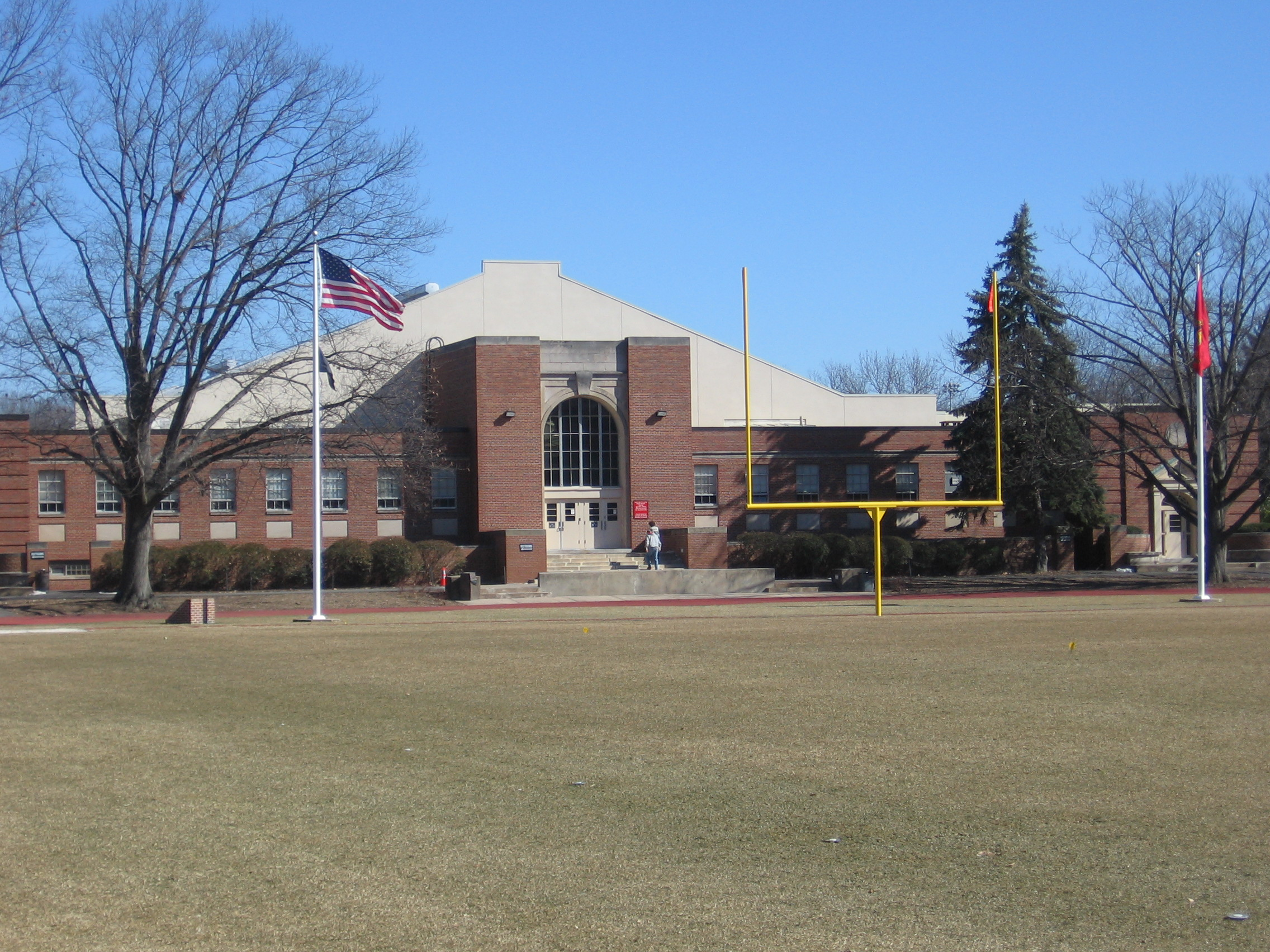
The Lavino Field House, home of Lawrenceville athletics (now part of the Tsai Field House)

Lawrenceville athletics compete in the Mid-Atlantic Prep League. In addition, through the Eight Schools Athletic Council, the members of the Eight Schools Association organize sports events and tournaments among ESA schools.

Lawrenceville competes with other schools in baseball, basketball, crew, cross-country, fencing, field hockey, football, golf, ice hockey, indoor and outdoor track, lacrosse, soccer, softball, squash, swimming, tennis, volleyball, water polo and wrestling. In addition, the School offers a variety of intramural sports, including Ultimate Disc for the girls' Crescent Houses and 8-man flag football for the boys' Circle Houses.

=== Hill School rivalry ===
Lawrenceville's rival is The Hill School of Pottstown, Pennsylvania, another member of the Mid-Atlantic Prep League. On the first or second weekend of November during "Hill Weekend," the two schools celebrate the nation's eighth-oldest high school football rivalry and fifth-oldest private school rivalry, dating back to 1887.

=== Athletic achievements ===
In the spring of 2015, the Lawrenceville Boys' varsity crew team won the MAPL League Championship, beating out Peddie, Hun, and Blair; placed first at the US Rowing Mid-Atlantic Youth Championship; and then went on to place 4th at the US Rowing Youth Nationals held in Camden, NJ. The crew was selected for the Henley Royal Regatta and is widely regarded as the greatest crew in the school's history. Multiple members of this crew either went on to race for the United States Jr. National Team or row at D1 universities such as Cal, Wisconsin, Yale, Georgetown, and Northeastern, or the United States Jr. National Development Team. In the fall of 2010, the Lawrenceville boys' varsity crew team won the Head of the Christina Regatta in Delaware, then placed 14th in a field of 75 at the Head of the Charles Regatta in Boston, Massachusetts, later in the season.

In the spring of 2008, the Lawrenceville boys' and girls' varsity track and field team completed its season undefeated, placing first in the NJISSAA and MAPL. In the winter of 2011, the 4x200 team was the fastest in the nation, earning each one of them the status of All-American. By January 2014, the Lawrenceville boys' varsity track team had won 103 dual meets in a row; the boys' team has not lost a dual meet, a Prep State A championship, or the MAPL championship since 2006. In winter 2014, the 4x55 Shuttle Hurdle Relay team was ranked number 2 in New Jersey and number 3 in the nation.

On November 6, 2005, the Lawrenceville girls' varsity field hockey team defeated Stuart Country Day School 2–1 to capture their third straight Prep A state championship. On November 5, 2006, the varsity field hockey team defeated Stuart Country Day School 1–0 to capture their fourth straight Prep A state championship. In 2007 they tied rival Stuart Country Day School for a shared victory in their fifth straight Prep A state championship with a 2–2 tie on a late Lawrenceville goal.

On February 12, 2006, the Lawrenceville varsity boys' squash team won the National Championship for the third year in a row.

In May, 2006, the boys' varsity baseball team won the New Jersey Prep A championship over Peddie School in a doubleheader (14-0 and 6–1), earning their second state championship in three years. Lawrenceville defeated Peddie again in the 2010 finals to win its second consecutive Prep A title.

In May, 2023, the boys' varsity lacrosse team won the Prep Nationals championship game over Brunswick School by a score of 14-13 in double overtime. They finished the season on an 18-game winning streak, to end with a record of 19-1. The team went on to win the Prep National Championship the following year too, defeating Brunswick 14-5. In the 2025 tournament, the Big Red won the championship again, overcoming Salisbury 12-4 for secure three championships in a row.

== Notable alumni ==
Lawrentians in the arts include writers Owen Johnson, James Merrill, Frederick Buechner, and Bill Berkson; musicians Huey Lewis and Dierks Bentley; and screenwriter Merian C. Cooper. Those active in media and entertainment include author and ecologist Aldo Leopold (1904–1905), socialite and Real Housewife of New York Tinsley Mortimer, and athletes Joakim Noah and Bobby Sanguinetti, and financial analyst Celeste Mellet.

== Notable faculty ==
- Samuel Cochran (1871–1952), former Presbyterian missionary and public health researcher in China
- Kenneth W. Keuffel (1923 –2006), American football coach at Lawrenceville, who was the 25th head football coach of the Wabash Little Giants football team
- Bill Littlefield (born 1948), former NPR radio host and author
- Thornton Wilder (1897–1975), three-time Pulitzer Prize-winning author

== In popular culture ==
Lawrenceville was featured in several novels by Owen Johnson, who graduated from Lawrenceville in 1895:

- The Eternal Boy (1909)
- The Prodigious Hickey (1910)
- The Humming Bird (1910)
- The Varmint (1910), adapted into the 1950 film The Happy Years, which was filmed on the Lawrenceville campus
- The Tennessee Shad (1911)

From 1987 to 1989, PBS ran the miniseries The Lawrenceville Stories, also based on Johnson's Lawrenceville tales.
