= Sasha-Mae Eccleston =

Classicist

- Citizenship: United States
- Title: John Rowe Workman Assistant Professor of Classics
- Awards: Andrew W. Mellon Foundation Rome Prize

Academic background
- Thesis: Apuleius' Novel Narrative: Speech, Ethics, and Humanity in the Metamorphoses

Academic work
- Discipline: Classics
- Sub-discipline: Reception studies
- Institutions: Brown University

Sasha-Mae Eccleston is a classicist and the John Rowe Workman Assistant Professor of Classics at Brown University. She is an expert on reception studies and the works of Apuleius. She is the co-founder of Eos, an academic network which focuses on Africana receptions of Ancient Greece and Rome.

== Biography ==
Eccleston was born in Kingston, Jamaica. Her family moved to New Jersey when she was four years old. She was awarded a scholarship to Lawrenceville School and went on to study Classics and Literary Arts at Brown University. She studied for an MPhil in Greek and Latin Languages and Literatures at Oxford University, for which she was awarded a Rhodes Scholarship. In 2014 she was awarded a PhD by University of California, Berkeley, with a thesis entitled: Apuleius' Novel Narrative: Speech, Ethics, and Humanity in the Metamorphoses. Her research foci include reception studies, moral philosophy, and the Apuleian corpus.

In 2017 she was appointed the John Rowe Workman Assistant Professor of Classics at Brown University. She was previously Assistant Professor Classics at Pomona College. From 2017 to 2020 she was co-president of Eos, a scholarly organisation she also co-founded, that concentrates on Africana receptions of Ancient Greece and Rome. With Dan-el Padilla Peralta she co-founded Racing the Classics, an international conference series which concentrates in the development of critical race theory in Classics.

== Awards ==
- Andrew W. Mellon Foundation Rome Prize (American Academy in Rome - National Endowment for the Humanities) - 2021-22

== Selected works ==
- 'Racing The Classics: Ethos and Praxis. American Journal of Philology 143.2 (2022): 199–218.
- 'Medals and Metals: Speculating Freedom in Suzan-Lori Parks's Father Comes Home from the Wars', Modern Drama 64:1 (2021), 24-46
- 'Cyrus Console's The Odicy and epic ecology.' Classical Receptions Journal 11.1 (2019): 23–43.
- 'Fantasies of Mimnermos in Anne Carson's “The Brainsex Paintings”(Plainwater).' Classical Traditions in Modern Fantasy (2016): 271.
