= The Lawrenceville Stories =

1980s Canadian television miniseries

- Genre: Historical novel-based Drama
- Written by: Jan Jaffe Kahn
- Directed by: Allan A. Goldstein; Robert Iscove
- Starring: Zach Galligan; Edward Herrmann; Nicholas Rowe; Stephen Baldwin
- Theme music composer: Hagood Hardy
- Country of origin: Canada
- Original language: English
- No. of episodes: 3

Production
- Cinematography: Rene Ohashi
- Editor: Ronald Sanders

Original release
- Release: January 26, 1987 – April 5, 1989

The Lawrenceville Stories (also known as The Prodigious Hickey) is a 1987–1989 miniseries, directed by Allan A. Goldstein and Robert Iscove, based on The Lawrenceville Stories written by Owen Johnson. The series was originally broadcast as episodes of the American Playhouse anthology television series on Public Broadcasting Service starting on January 26, 1987 (Season 6, Episode 2). It follows the adventures of school prankster Hickey (Zach Galligan) and his rival, The Tennessee Shad (Nicholas Rowe).

== Plot ==
Lawrenceville prankster Hickey pulls one prank too many and is expelled from school. When he returns he finds that there's a new joker in town, The Tennessee Shad, and although they initially are rivals, they soon realize that together they can cause more trouble, so they establish a partnership that they call "The Firm".

== Cast ==
- Zach Galligan as William "Hickey" Hicks
- Nicholas Rowe as The Tennessee Shad
- Edward Herrmann as The Headmaster
- Stephen Baldwin as GutterPup
- Josh Hamilton as Lovely
- Robert Joy as Housemaster Tapping
- Dave Foley as Smith

== Episodes ==
Part	Title	Directed by	Written by	Original release date
1	"The Prodigious Hickey"	Robert Iscove	Jan Jaffe Kahn	January 26, 1987
Hickey, the Lawrenceville prankster pulls one stunt too many and the Headmaster is forced to expel him.
2	"The Return of Hickey"	Allan A. Goldstein	Jan Jaffe Kahn	February 3, 1988
Hickey returns to school, and to his shock he finds that a new prankster called "The Tennessee Shad" has taken his crown.
3	"The Beginning of the Firm"	Allan A. Goldstein	Jan Jaffe Kahn	April 5, 1989
The rivalry between Hickey and The Shad begins to take a different direction when they realize they can cause more trouble together, as "The Firm".

== Other Media ==
The 1950 film The Happy Years was also based on The Lawrenceville School Stories. Directed by William Wellman, it starred Dean Stockwell as Dink Stover.
