= Owen Johnson (writer) =

American novelist

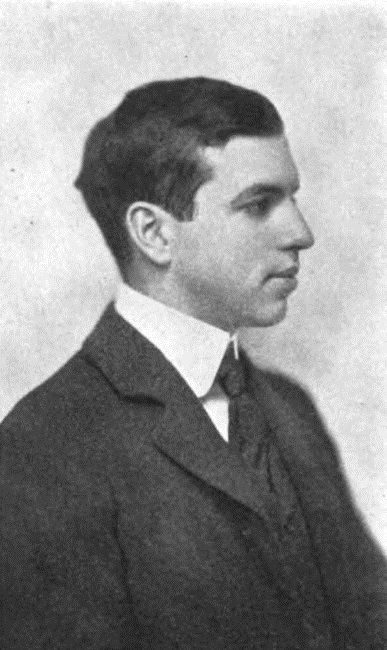
Owen Johnson.

Owen McMahon Johnson (August 27, 1878 – January 27, 1952) was an American writer best remembered for his stories and novels cataloguing the educational and personal growth of the fictional character Dink Stover. The "Lawrenceville Stories" (The Prodigious Hickey, The Tennessee Shad, The Varmint, Skippy Bedelle, The Hummingbird), set in the well-known prep school, invite comparison with Kipling's Stalky & Co. A 1950 film, The Happy Years, and a 1987 PBS mini-series, The Lawrenceville Stories, were based on them.

== Biography ==
He was born in New York City, the son of Robert Underwood Johnson and his wife Katharine, née McMahon, and attended Lawrenceville School, founding and editing the Lawrenceville Literary Magazine, known as The Lit. He attended Yale University, as a member of the Class of 1900, graduating in 1901, marrying Mary Galt Stockly and moving to Paris, where he did his initial writing. He was a war correspondent for the New York Times and Collier's during World War I.

His first wife died in 1910. He married his second wife Esther Ellen Cobb (better known as Cobina Wright Sr.) in 1912 and divorced in 1917. His third wife, Cecile Denise de la Garde, died in 1918. His fourth wife, Catherine Sayre Burton, who died in 1923. His fifth wife was Gertrude Bovee Le Boutillier. He was the father of five children.

Johnson worked and resided in Stockbridge, Massachusetts from 1923 to 1948, writing about marriage, divorce, and golf. After 1931, his writing activities became less intense, and he became interested in politics, running (unsuccessfully) for the House of Representatives in 1936 and 1938.

He died at his home in Vineyard Haven, Massachusetts, where he had lived for five years.

== Writings ==
- Arrows of the Almighty (1901).
- In the Name of Liberty (1905).
- Max Fargus (1906).
- The Eternal Boy (1909; a 'Lawrenceville' story).
- The Prodigious Hickey (1910; a reissue of The Eternal Boy).
- The Humming Bird (1910; also one of the 'Lawrenceville' stories).
- The Varmint (1910; introducing Dink Stover at Lawrenceville).
- The Tennessee Shad (1911; a 'Lawrenceville' story).
- Stover at Yale (1912; Dink Stover from The Varmint goes to Yale).
- Murder in Any Degree (1913; stories).
- The Sixty-first Second (1913; a novel concerning the Panic of 1907).
- The Salamander (1913).
- Making Money (1915).
- The Woman Gives (1915).
- The Spirit of France (1916; nonfiction).
- Virtuous Wives (1918).
- The Wasted Generation (1921).
- Skippy Bedelle (1922; also one of the 'Lawrenceville' stories).
- Blue Blood (1923).
- Children of Divorce (1927).
- Sacrifice (1929).
- The Coming of the Amazons (1931).

== Adaptions ==
Several films are based upon Johnson novels, including The Salamander (1916) produced by B. S. Moss, The Varmint (1917), Virtuous Wives (1918), The Woman Gives (1920), The Enemy Sex (1924) (based on The Salamander), Children of Divorce (1927), and The Happy Years (1950) starring Dean Stockwell and Leo G. Carroll.

A 1987-1989 miniseries of The Lawrenceville Stories was directed by Allan A. Goldstein and Robert Iscove. The series followed the adventures of school prankster Hickey (Zach Galligan) and his rival, The Tennessee Shad (Nicholas Rowe).
