= Samuel McClintock Hamill =

American educator and clergyman (1812–1889)

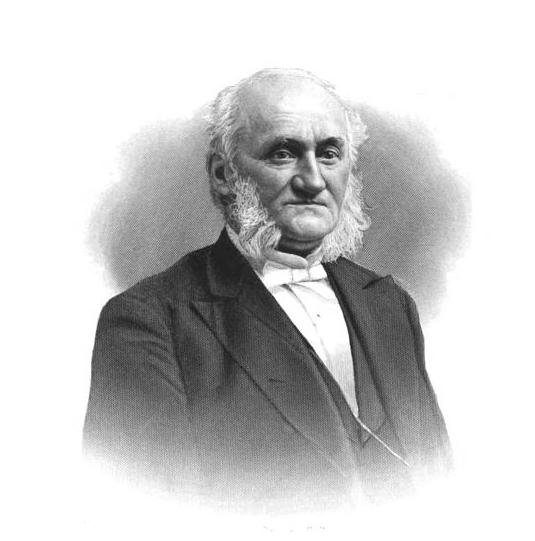
- Born: July 6, 1812; Norristown, Pennsylvania, US
- Died: September 21, 1889 (aged 77); Trenton, New Jersey, US

Samuel McClintock Hamill (July 6, 1812 – September 21, 1889) was an American educator and Presbyterian clergyman. Hamill was the longest serving Head Master of the Lawrenceville School near Princeton, NJ.

== Biography ==
Hamill was born in Norristown, Pennsylvania on July 6, 1812, and graduated from Jefferson College currently (Washington & Jefferson College) in 1834. He received his D.D. from Rutgers University and Hanover College in 1862. He was an accomplished Presbyterian clergyman, educator, New Jersey State Superintendent of Public Schools, and a founder of the New Jersey Historical Society. After President Abraham Lincoln's death, Hamill composed a widely circulated eulogy for the assassinated president. In 1837 he became the third Head Master of classical and commercial boarding-school. Hamill strengthened the small school which was ultimately renamed The Lawrenceville School. He remains the school's longest serving Head Master. He died in Trenton, New Jersey in 1889 and is buried in the Lawrenceville Cemetery in Lawrenceville, NJ.
