= David W. Crane =

American businessman (born 1959)

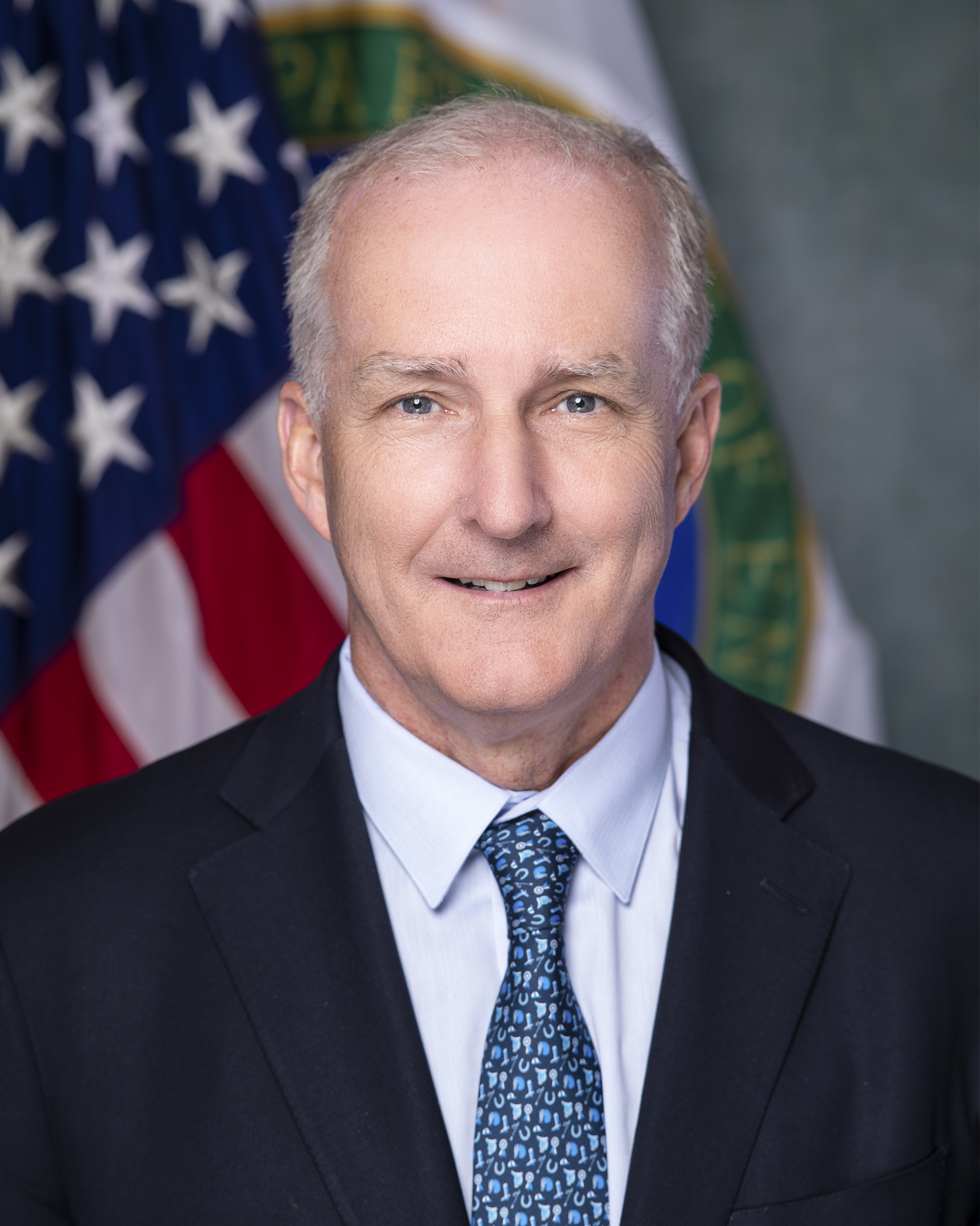

Under Secretary of Energy for Infrastructure
- In office June 14, 2023 – January 20, 2025
- President: Joe Biden
- Preceded by: Mark Menezes (2020)
- Succeeded by: Preston Wells Griffith III

Personal details
- Born: David W. Crane; 1959 (age 66–67)
- Education: Princeton University (BA); Harvard Law School (JD)

David W. Crane (born 1959) is an American lawyer, investment banker and business executive in the energy industry. He served as the Undersecretary for Infrastructure in the United States Department of Energy from 2023 to 2025.

== Early life and education ==
David Crane grew up in Lake Forest, Illinois, on the Lake Michigan shore. His father was an aluminum sales executive. At 14 years old he wanted to be a lawyer. Crane graduated from the Woodrow Wilson School of Public and International Affairs at Princeton University with a Bachelor of Arts and from Harvard Law School with a Juris Doctor.

== Career ==
From 1991 to 1996, Crane worked in various positions at ABB Energy Ventures as Vice President for the Asia-Pacific Region.

From January 1999 to February 2000, Crane served as a Senior Vice President in the global power business department of Lehman Brothers, called the "Global Power Group", where he was responsible for project financing in emerging markets (Latin America and Asia) with a focus on privatization of state-owned utilities as in Thailand and Brazil.

From March 2000 to 2003, Crane worked for International Power, managing the business overall and implementing its strategy. He was Executive Director from 2000 to 2003, Chief Operating Officer from March 2000 to December 2002, and Chief Executive Officer from January 2003 to November 2003. During his tenure at International Power he is credited with increasing the stock value by 46%.

Crane joined then Minneapolis based NRG Energy in 2003 as CEO. He was the Director of El Paso Natural Gas from December 2009 to May 2012 and served as CEO and President at GenOn Energy Americas Generation and GenOn Mid Atlantic, before NRG acquired it in 2012. Crane moved NRG from Minneapolis, where the firm existed as an Xcel subsidiary, to Princeton, New Jersey.

He doubled NRG's generating capacity, quadrupling sales. Shares of the company outperformed S&P 500 and Dow Jones indexes as well as Exelon, NRG’s largest competitor. In December 2015, Crane resigned from his position at NRG, succeeded by Mauricio Gutierrez.

In April 2016 Crane joined sustainability oriented investment firm Pegasus Capital Advisors as its Chief Strategy Officer, as Operating Advisor and Senior Operating Executive. Since 2016 he has been director of Saudi Arabian ACWA Power International, directing the ACWA Holding, Lighting Science Group Corporation and ACWA Guc, the ACWA subsidiary in Turkey.

He served as a Director of EP Energy. As of February 2017 he remains Chairman of Nuclear Innovation North America, an NRG subsidiary investing in and developing nuclear power projects in North America such as the Advanced boiling water reactor at the South Texas Nuclear Generating Station.

In August 2022, Crane was nominated by President Joe Biden to serve as Under Secretary for Infrastructure at the United States Department of Energy. He was confirmed by the Senate on June 7, 2023, and was sworn in on June 14, 2023.

== Vision ==
Crane has been part of the fossil fuel industry since the beginning of his career. When NRG shifted to green energies, NRG had 3 million customers. With its "shift to green power systems [he hopes this will] keep them." He stated that given "80% of residential solar installations are done on 20-year leases, that means you’re my customer for the next 20 years. You’re not leaving."

== Personal life ==
Crane lives in the Lawrenceville section of Lawrence Township, Mercer County, New Jersey, with his wife Isabella de la Houssaye, a corporate lawyer and endurance athlete, who died in December 2023 at the age of 59; Crane and his wife had welcomed their children to join them as part of their challenging activities. The couple has five children. His eldest son, Cason Crane, was the first openly gay mountaineer to scale the Seven Summits. Another son, Oliver Crane, is the youngest person to ever row across the Atlantic Ocean solo.

Crane once owned Graffiti, a bar in Hong Kong, has trekked across Costa Rica and rebuilt homes in Haiti with his children.
