= Nicholas Rowe (actor) =

British actor

- Born: Nicholas James Sebastian Rowe; 22 November 1966 (age 59); Edinburgh, Scotland, UK
- Occupation: Actor
- Years active: 1984–present
- Partner: Lou Gish (2000–2006, her death)
- Children: 1
- Parent: Andrew Rowe (father)

Nicholas James Sebastian Rowe (born 22 November 1966) is a British actor. At the start of his career he appeared as the lead in the 1985 film Young Sherlock Holmes.

== Early life and education ==
Nicholas James Sebastian Rowe was born on 22 November 1966 in Edinburgh, Scotland, to English parents Alison, a singer, and Andrew Rowe, an editor (who subsequently became a Conservative Party Member of Parliament).

He received his formal education at Eton College, where he acted in school productions, and subsequently received a Bachelor of Arts degree in Hispanic studies from the University of Bristol.

== Career ==
Rowe has appeared in a variety of films, television dramas, and plays.

He played Sherlock Holmes in Barry Levinson's film Young Sherlock Holmes (1985), having read for the part while still at school. He returned to the role of Sherlock Holmes 30 years later in the 2015 film Mr. Holmes, in which he played the part in a film that the "real" Mr. Holmes, now a 93-year-old (played by Ian McKellen) goes to see at a theatre.

== Personal life ==
Rowe was the partner of Lou Gish for six years until her death from cancer in February 2006.

== Filmography ==
=== Films ===
Year	Title	Role
1984	Another Country	Spungin
1985	Young Sherlock Holmes	Sherlock Holmes
1996	True Blue	David Ball
1998	Lock, Stock and Two Smoking Barrels	J
2000	Hit List	Jeremy
2001	All Forgotten	Maidanov
2001	Enigma	Villers
2001	Lover's Prayer	Madianov
2002	Nicholas Nickleby	Lord Verisopht
2003	Girl on a Cycle	Harry
2004	Hidden Flaws	Rental agent
2004	Seed of Chucky	Lawyer
2010	The Duel	Sheshkovsky
2010	Shanghai	Ralph
2013	Delicious	Adolf
2015	Mr. Holmes	Matinee Sherlock
2016	Snowden	Assistant Editor Guardian
2018	Old Boys	Headmaster
2020	Waiting for Anya	The Mayor
2021	Operation Mincemeat	Captain David Ainsworth
2024	Joy	James Watson

=== Television ===
Year	Title	Role	Notes
1987	The Lawrenceville Stories	The Tennessee Shad	
1994	Sharpe's Enemy	Gilliand	
1995	Pie in the Sky	Kevin Wright	Episode: "Lemon Twist"
1996	Poldark	Lord Edward Fitzmaurice	
1996	Dalziel and Pascoe	Gervase Butt	Episode: "An Autumn Shroud"
1997	A Dance to the Music of Time	David Pennistone	
1997	Kavanagh QC	Charles Beaufort	2 episodes
1998	Dangerfield	Dan Spearill	Episode: "The Long Weekend"
1999	Let Them Eat Cake	Julian Desire	Episode: "Murder"
2000	Relic Hunter	Peter Graham	Episode: "The Last Knight"
2000	Longitude	King George	
2001	The Infinite Worlds of H. G. Wells	Professor Gibberne	
2002	Shackleton	Thomas Orde-Lees	
2002	Outside the Rules	Dr. Gerry Saddler	
2003	Holby City	Nathan Cairns	Episode: "Desperate Measures"
2004	The Lady Musketeer	Duke of Buckingham	
2004, 2013	Midsomer Murders	David Heartley-Reade	2 episodes
2004	World's Worst Century	Gui de Chauliae	
2005	Princes in the Tower	Ambassador de Puebla	
2005	The Fugitives	Boyer	
2005	Space Race	R.V. Jones	
2005	A Waste of Shame: The Mystery of Shakespeare and His Sonnets	Richard Burbage	
2006	Beau Brummell: This Charming Man	Lord Charles Manners	
2006	The Complete Guide to Parenting	Marko	
2006	A Harlot's Progress	Henry Fielding	
2007	Sold	Richard	
2008	Hotel Babylon	Jonah Slaughter	Episode: "The Faith Healer"
2009	Stockwell	Narrator (voice)	
2009	Kingdom	Robert Morston	Episode: "Kingdom"
2009	Margaret	Malcolm Rifkind	
2009	Doctor Who: Dreamland	Rivesh Mantilax (voice)	
2010	National Theatre Live: Nation	Father	
2011	The Borgias	Baron Bonadeo	2 episodes
2012	Loving Miss Hatto	James	
2013	Da Vinci's Demons	Cardinal Orsini	
2014	Inspector George Gently	Chief Martin Langham	Episode: "Gently Going Under"
2015	The Last Kingdom	Father Asser	
2016	The Crown	Jock Colville	
2016	Doctor Thorne	Mortimer Gazebee	
2017	Genius	Jost Winteler	
2017	Riviera	Geoffrey Anderton	
2020	Washington	George Washington	
2020	Roadkill	Adam De Banzie	
2021	A Very British Scandal	Ian Fraser	
2022	A Spy Among Friends	Anthony Blunt	
2023	The Killing Kind	Angus Grey	
2024	The Outlaws	Strickland	
2026	Red Eye	Alex Peterson	Series 2

=== Theatre ===
Production	Play	Character	Dates
Broadway	Hamlet	Guildenstern	14 April 1995 – 22 July 1995
London	Tammy Faye		2022
Royal Court, London	Are You Watching?	Father	9 June – 4 July 2026

=== Video games ===
Year	Title	Role	Notes
2017	Xenoblade Chronicles 2	Poppibuster (Mech)	
2018	Xenoblade Chronicles 2: Torna – The Golden Country	Imperial Captain	
