= The Happy Years =

1950 film by William A. Wellman

- Film poster
- Directed by: William Wellman
- Written by: Harry Ruskin
- Based on: The Varmint: A Lawrenceville Story by: 1910 book; Owen Johnson
- Produced by: Carey Wilson
- Starring: Dean Stockwell; Darryl Hickman; Scotty Beckett; Leon Ames; Margalo Gillmore
- Cinematography: Paul C. Vogel
- Edited by: John Dunning
- Music by: Leigh Harline
- Color process: Technicolor
- Distributed by: Metro-Goldwyn-Mayer
- Release date: July 14, 1950 (Los Angeles)
- Running time: 109-110 mins
- Country: United States
- Language: English
- Budget: $1,393,000
- Box office: $855,000

The Happy Years is a 1950 Technicolor MGM film starring Dean Stockwell and based on the 1910 novel The Varmint by Owen Johnson. It concerns the adventures of Dink Stover, a boy attending the Lawrenceville School in New Jersey.

== Plot ==
Expelled from numerous preparatory schools, most recently after causing a campus explosion, young John Humperdink Stover is given one last chance by his father to find maturity and discipline along with a proper education. On the way to a new academy, Stover disrupts the trip of fellow carriage passenger Mr. Hopkins by causing the horse to break into a gallop. He is unaware that Hopkins is the Latin teacher and housemaster at his school.

Given the nickname "Dink," he becomes acquainted with other students, such as "Tough" McCarty and "Tennessee" Shad, and becomes engaged in fights with the other boys. The rivalry spills onto the football field and also includes elaborate pranks played on several neighborhood girls, starting with Connie Brown, during the summer break. On the verge of being expelled from yet another school, Dink comes to his senses just in time, making his father proud at last.

== Cast ==
- Dean Stockwell as Dink Stover
- Darryl Hickman as Tough McCarty
- Scotty Beckett as Tennessee Shad
- Leo G. Carroll as Mr. Hopkins
- Leon Ames as Sam Stover
- Margalo Gillmore as Maude Stover
- Elinor Donahue as Connie (billed as Mary Eleanor Donahue)
- Claudia Barrett as Dolly Travers
- Robert Wagner as Adams (uncredited)
- Henry Blair as Joe Crocker

The film marked Wagner's screen debut.

== Production ==
The film's working title was Dink Stover but was changed to The Happy Years in March 1950.

== Reception ==
Reviewer Marjory Adams of The Boston Globe called the film "a pleasant, flavorsome story" that "manages to instill nostalgic humor and sentiment into the fairly mild plot."

According to MGM records, the movie earned $680,000 in the U.S. and Canada and $175,000 elsewhere, resulting in a loss of $1,096,000.
