= Isaac Van Arsdale Brown =

Isaac Van Arsdale Brown (November 4, 1784 – April 19, 1861) was an American educator and Presbyterian clergyman.

== School founding ==
In 1810 he Maidenhead Academy in Maidenhead, New Jersey. This was located about 5 miles south of Princeton, New Jersey. Opening with nine male students. Eventually, with funding by one of those first-year students, John Cleve Green, Lawrenceville School was formed in 1883 after Green Foundation purchased school in 1879 and embarked on major building program. This significantly expanded the all-male boarding school.

== Biography ==
Brown was born in Somerset County, New Jersey, November 4, 1784. He graduated, in 1802, from the College of New Jersey (now Princeton University). He studied theology under Dr. John Woodhull, of Freehold Township, New Jersey. Later, he was ordained by the New Brunswick presbytery, and in 1807 was made pastor of Presbyterian Church at Lawrenceville, New Jersey.

With change of name for the village to Lawrenceville in 1816, which Brown had supported, the name of the school was changed to Lawrenceville Academy. Then, in 1829, to Lawrenceville High School. In 1834, Reverend Brown sold Lawrenceville High School to Alexander Hamilton Phillips.

Reverend Brown remained in Lawrenceville for several years, becoming partner of group that owned Lawrenceville Female Seminary, founded 1834. It was a sister school to Classical and Commercial High School. Female Seminary was eliminated in 1883 when Lawrenceville School took over.

In 1842 he moved to Mount Holly, New Jersey, and subsequently to Trenton, New Jersey, where he devoted his time principally to literary work. Among his publications are "Life of Robert Finley, D. D.," "The Unity of the Human Race." and also a "Historical Vindication of the Abrogation of the Plan of Union by the Presbyterian Church in the United States of America" (Philadelphia, 1855). Dr. Brown was one of the founders of the American Colonization Society, and worked for its advancement, and was one of the original members of the American Bible Society. He died on April 19, 1861, in Trenton, NJ.
