= Lawrenceville, New Jersey =

CDP in New Jersey, US

- Census-designated place
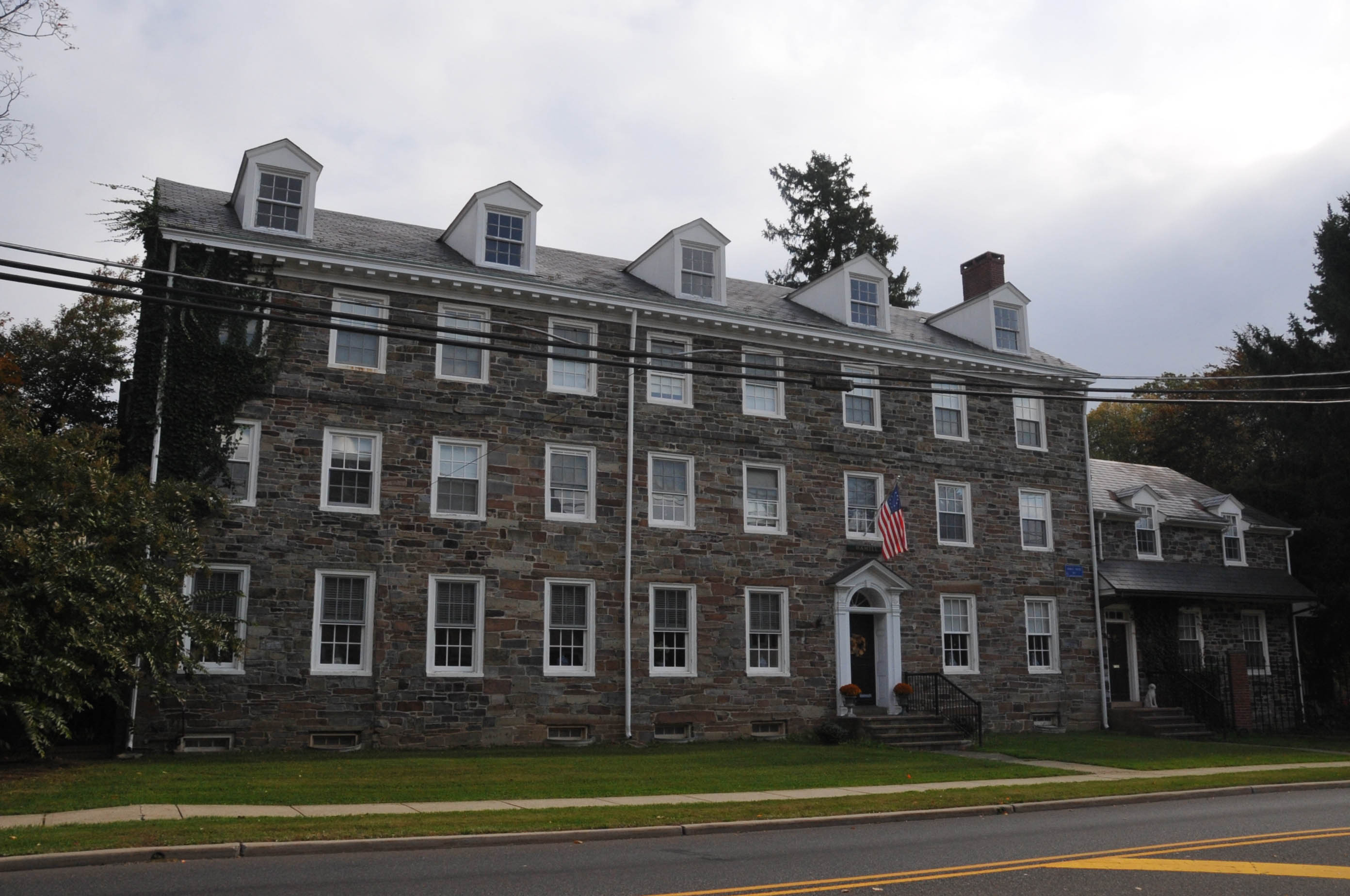
- The Hamill House was built in 1814 by Isaac Van Arsdale Brown, D.D. (1784–1861). This fieldstone schoolhouse was the original building for The Lawrenceville School and is a national landmark.

- Location in Mercer County and the state of New Jersey

- Location in Mercer County Location in New Jersey Location in the United States
- Coordinates: 40.302787°N 74.738004°W
- Country: United States
- State: New Jersey
- County: Mercer
- Township: Lawrence
- Named for: Maidenhead, England

Area
  - Total: 1.04 sq mi (2.70 km^{2})
  - Land: 1.04 sq mi (2.70 km^{2})
  - Water: 0 sq mi (0.00 km^{2}) 0.09%
- Elevation: 184 ft (56 m)

Population (2020)
  - Total: 3,751
  - Density: 3,606.7/sq mi (1,392.6/km^{2})
- Time zone: UTC−05:00 (Eastern (EST))
  - Summer (DST): UTC−04:00 (Eastern (EDT))
- ZIP Code: 08648
- Area code: 609
- FIPS code: 34-39570
- GNIS feature ID: 02390044

Lawrenceville is an unincorporated community and census-designated place (CDP) within Lawrence Township in Mercer County, in the U.S. state of New Jersey. The community is situated roughly halfway between Princeton and Trenton. Lawrenceville is part of the Trenton–Princeton metropolitan area within the New York combined statistical area; however, the CDP actually is located approximately 15 miles closer to Philadelphia than to New York City, and as with the remainder of Mercer County, lies within the Federal Communications Commission's Philadelphia Designated Market Area. As of the 2020 census, the CDP's population was 3,751, a decrease of 136 (−3.5%) from the 3,887 recorded at the 2010 census, which in turn had reflected a decrease of 194 (−4.8%) from the 4,081 counted in the 2000 census.

Lawrenceville is also known as the "village of Lawrenceville". Its core is the Main Street Historic District, which was listed both in the New Jersey Register of Historic Places and National Register of Historic Places in 1972, and was one of the first registered historic districts in New Jersey.

== History ==
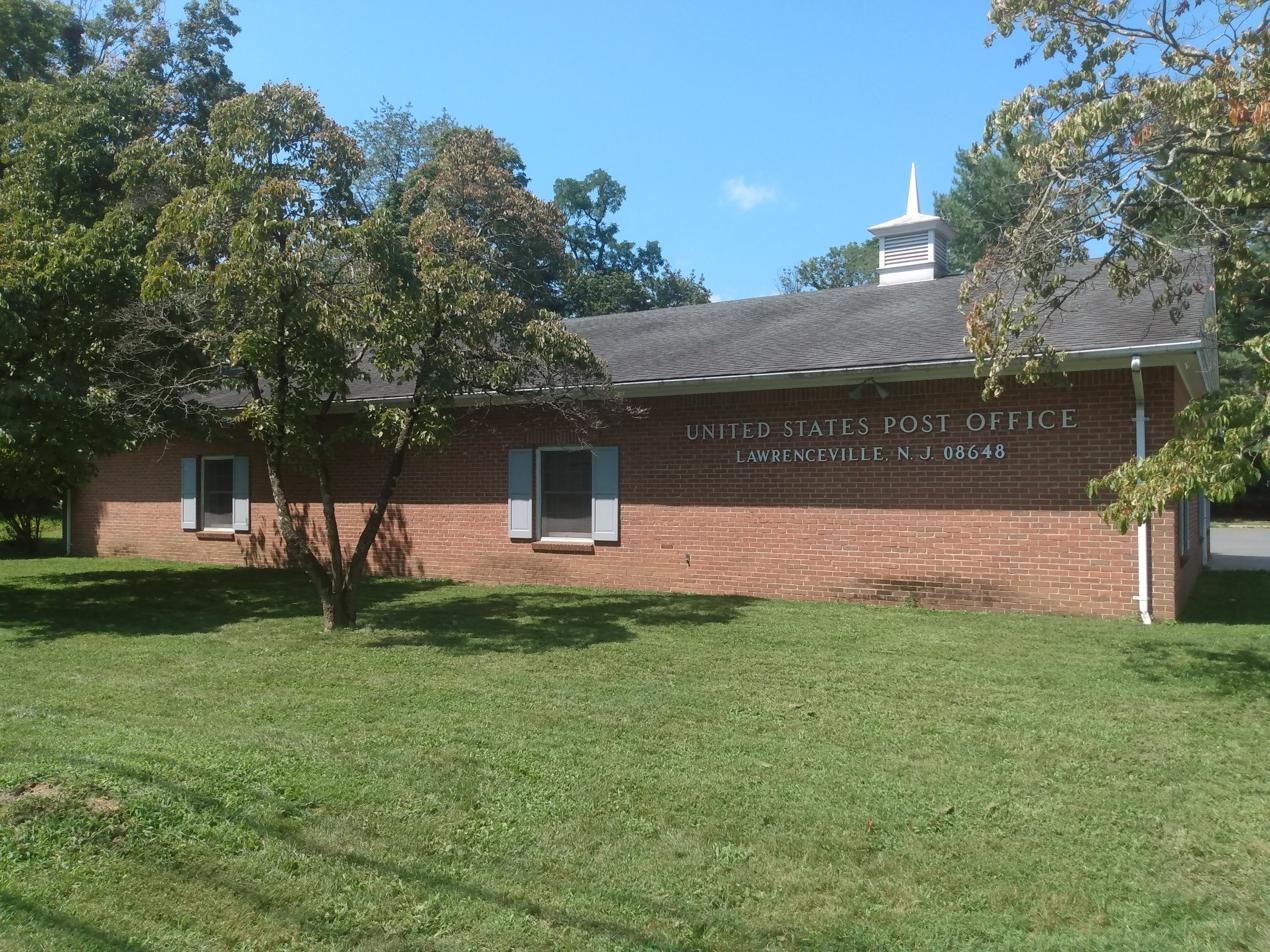
U.S. Post Office at Lawrenceville's ZIP Code 08648

Lawrenceville was founded as Maidenhead in 1697, as part of Burlington County in the colony of West Jersey. In 1714, the village became a part of Hunterdon County. In 1798, the New Jersey Legislature legally incorporated the Township of Maidenhead.

The village was originally named for Maidenhead, a historic English town on the Thames River, about 30 miles west from London. The Colonial Supreme Court at Burlington officially confirmed the name on February 20, 1697. "Maidenhead" derives from the Anglo Saxon word "Maidenhythe," meaning "new wharf", though it acquired a secondary meaning as a term for virginity.

The Rev. Issac V. Brown, the first full-time pastor of the Presbyterian Church of Lawrenceville and the founder of the Academy of Maidenhead (now the Lawrenceville School), led a movement to petition the Legislature to change the town's name. The petition said "... it must be the wish of every good citizen... to be relieved of the necessity of using a term which may offend the delicacy of modesty, or disturb the feelings of seriousness, or excite the sneers of the willing."

The Legislature officially changed the name from Maidenhead to Lawrence on January 24, 1816, at a meeting in John Moore's Tavern. The township took its name from Captain James Lawrence, a naval hero of the War of 1812. The village was renamed Lawrenceville at the same time. In 1838, Mercer County was formed from parts of three counties, and Lawrence Township was included in the new county. The township's boundaries and geographic relationships have remained the same since that time.

During the American Revolutionary War, George Washington's troops marched through Maidenhead after the Battle of Trenton (December 26, 1776) and the Battle of the Assunpink Creek (January 2, 1777), chasing British troops. They met at the Battle of Princeton on January 3, 1777, just over the township line, where the Princeton Battlefield State Park now stands.

Cornwallis stayed overnight in Maidenhead on December 8, 1776, en route to Trenton. He recorded the moment in his diary, a portion of which was found years later in John Moore's Tavern, which is now a residential house at 2695 Main Street. His opinion of the village was that "one night in Maidenhead was more than enough".

When the Presbyterian Church of Lawrenceville was built in 1698, it was called the Meetinghouse of Maidenhead. It is still serving the community at 2688 Main Street.

== Geography ==
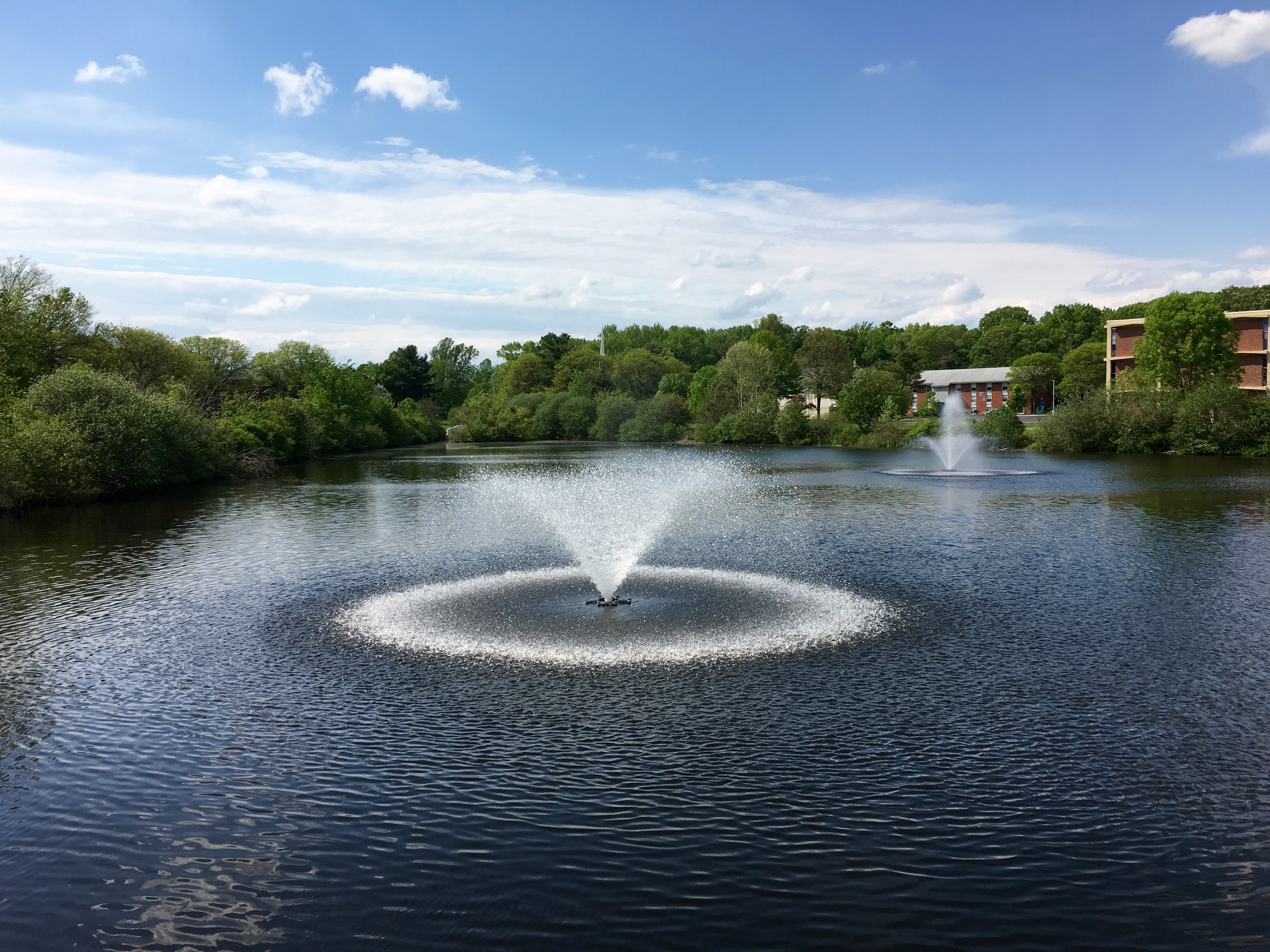
Centennial Lake at Rider University

Lawrenceville is in central Mercer County, northeast of Trenton and southwest of Princeton. U.S. Route 206 changes its name from "Lawrenceville-Princeton Road" to "Main Street", and then to "Lawrenceville-Trenton Road" in the center of Lawrenceville. The local historic district fronts along Main Street and US 206 stretch for more than two miles between Franklin Corner Road and an area slightly north of Fackler Road. Homes situated more than 250 feet from the road are excluded, however. One exception is the section of the Lawrenceville School known as the Circle and several other buildings in its vicinity, the oldest buildings on the campus. This area itself has been designated a National Historic Landmark.

Lawrenceville generally comprises the area contained within Lawrenceville-Pennington Road to the southwest, Fackler Road to the northeast, Keefe Road to the northwest, and US 206 to the southeast, part of which turns into Main Street in Lawrenceville, to the east. The Lawrenceville School, across Route 206, is usually considered part of the village as well. Before tract development, beginning in the early 1970s, Lawrenceville was broadly defined as stretching two to three blocks back from Route 206. The boundary became less clear as residential developments replaced farmland behind the historic village. The boundary of the Lawrenceville census-designated place, used for all population statistics, follows the roads listed above, except that the northeast boundary is at Cold Soil Road rather than Fackler Road.

Lawrence Township is occasionally and mistakenly referred to as Lawrenceville. The confusion is partly caused because the local post office is located in the Lawrenceville CDP and the Postal Service once instructed Lawrence Township residents to use Lawrenceville, Princeton or Trenton as their mailing address. In 1973, voters approved a nonbinding referendum to petition the U.S. Postal Service to adopt a single municipal post office address known as Lawrenceville for the entire township; The effort failed. A township resident appeared before Township Council in July, 2007, to request to designate the 08648 ZIP code for Lawrence Township. Council approved a resolution in support of the request that was then forwarded to the U.S. Postal Service. Township officials had fought, off and on, for the change since 1969, when then-U.S. Rep. Frank Thompson tried unsuccessfully to convince U.S. Postal Service authorities to grant a Lawrence name tag for the entire township, according to a letter on file at the Municipal Clerk's Office. The United States Postal Service notified the township authorities in October 2007 that the preferred designation for the 08648 would be changed to "Lawrence Township".

Lawrenceville is equidistant between Trenton and Princeton, New Jersey, and approximately fifteen miles closer to Philadelphia than to New York City. Major transportation corridors have passed through Lawrenceville since the town's inception, including the King's Highway, which in the 18th century approximated today's U.S. Route 206. The predominant highway and commercial corridor through Lawrence Township is U.S. Route 1, southeast of Lawrenceville.

According to the U.S. Census Bureau, the Lawrenceville CDP has a total area of 1.043 square miles (2.70 km^{2}), including 1.042 square miles (2.70 km^{2}) of land and 0.001 square miles (0.0026 km^{2}) of water (0.09%). The community is drained by tributaries of Shipetaukin Creek, a southeast-flowing tributary of Assunpink Creek within the Delaware River watershed.

== Demographics ==
Historical population
Census	Pop.	Note	%±
1950	1,056		—
1990	6,446		—
2000	4,114	*	−36.2%
2010	3,887		−5.5%
2020	3,751		−3.5%
Population sources: 1950 1960 1970; 1980 1990 2000; 2010 2020 * = Lost territory during previous decade.

Lawrenceville appeared as an unincorporated community in the 1950 U.S. census. It did not appear in subsequent censuses until it was listed as a census designated place in the 1990 U.S. census.

=== Racial and ethnic composition ===
Lawrenceville CDP, New Jersey – Racial and ethnic composition Note: the US Census treats Hispanic/Latino as an ethnic category. This table excludes Latinos from the racial categories and assigns them to a separate category. Hispanics/Latinos may be of any race.
Race / Ethnicity (NH = Non-Hispanic)	Pop 2000	Pop 2010	Pop 2020	% 2000	% 2010	% 2020
White alone (NH)	3,493	3,195	2,794	85.59%	82.20%	74.49%
Black or African American alone (NH)	143	146	186	3.50%	3.76%	4.96%
Native American or Alaska Native alone (NH)	3	3	0	0.07%	0.08%	0.00%
Asian alone (NH)	257	302	326	6.30%	7.77%	8.69%
Native Hawaiian or Pacific Islander alone (NH)	0	0	0	0.00%	0.00%	0.00%
Other race alone (NH)	3	4	19	0.07%	0.10%	0.51%
Mixed race or Multiracial (NH)	74	69	172	1.81%	1.78%	4.59%
Hispanic or Latino (any race)	141	168	254	3.46%	4.32%	6.77%
Total	4,114	3,887	3,751	100.00%	100.00%	100.00%

=== 2020 census ===
As of the 2020 census, Lawrenceville had a population of 3,751. The median age was 46.4 years. 18.3% of residents were under the age of 18 and 21.8% were 65 years of age or older. For every 100 females there were 87.7 males, and for every 100 females age 18 and older there were 83.8 males.

100.0% of residents lived in urban areas and 0.0% lived in rural areas.

There were 1,718 households, of which 23.3% had children under the age of 18 living in them. Of all households, 48.3% were married-couple households, 14.7% had a male householder with no spouse or partner present, and 32.8% had a female householder with no spouse or partner present. About 34.7% of households were made up of individuals, and 15.6% had someone living alone who was 65 years of age or older.

There were 1,788 housing units, of which 3.9% were vacant. The homeowner vacancy rate was 1.3% and the rental vacancy rate was 3.4%.

=== 2010 census ===
The 2010 United States census counted 3,887 people, 1,734 households, and 1,046 families in the CDP. The population density was 3,731.1 people per square mile (1,440.6 people/km^{2}). There were 1,805 housing units at an average density of 1,732.6 units per square mile (669.0 units/km^{2}). The racial makeup was 85.16% (3,310) White, 3.99% (155) Black or African American, 0.10% (4) Native American, 7.77% (302) Asian, 0.00% (0) Pacific Islander, 0.80% (31) from other races, and 2.19% (85) from two or more races. Hispanic or Latino of any race were 4.32% (168) of the population.

Of the 1,734 households, 27.1% had children under the age of 18; 48.5% were married couples living together; 9.5% had a female householder with no husband present and 39.7% were non-families. Of all households, 33.1% were made up of individuals and 9.1% had someone living alone who was 65 years of age or older. The average household size was 2.24 and the average family size was 2.90.

20.6% of the population were under the age of 18, 5.9% from 18 to 24, 25.8% from 25 to 44, 35.3% from 45 to 64, and 12.3% who were 65 years of age or older. The median age was 43.2 years. For every 100 females, the population had 82.5 males. For every 100 females ages 18 and older there were 78.6 males.

=== 2000 census ===
As of the 2000 United States census there were 4,081 people, 1,747 households, and 1,070 families residing in the CDP. The population density was 1,515.1 people/km^{2} (3,924 people/mi^{2}). There were 1,776 housing units at an average density of 659.3 units/km^{2} (1,708 units/mi^{2}). The racial makeup of the CDP was 88.12% White, 3.58% African American, 0.07% Native American, 6.30% Asian, 0.54% from other races, and 1.40% from two or more races. Hispanic or Latino of any race were 3.46% of the population.

Of the 1,747 households, 32.2% had children under the age of 18 living with them; 48.7% were married couples living together; 10.5% had a female householder with no husband present; and 38.7% were non-families. 32.3% of all households were made up of individuals, and 8.6% had someone living alone who was 65 years of age or older. The average household size was 2.33 and the average family size was 2.99.

In the CDP the population was spread out, with 24.2% under the age of 18; 5.8% from 18 to 24; 32.2% from 25 to 44; 27.7% from 45 to 64; and 10.1% who were 65 years of age or older. The median age was 39 years. For every 100 females, there were 83.7 males. For every 100 females age 18 and over, there were 77.7 males.

The median income for a household in the CDP as of the year 2000 was $74,107. The median income for a family was $98,972. Males had a median income of $65,189 versus $37,972 for females. The per capita income for the CDP was $37,919. About 0.6% of families and 1.7% of the population were below the poverty line, including none of those under age 18 and 4.1% of those age 65 or over.

== Education ==
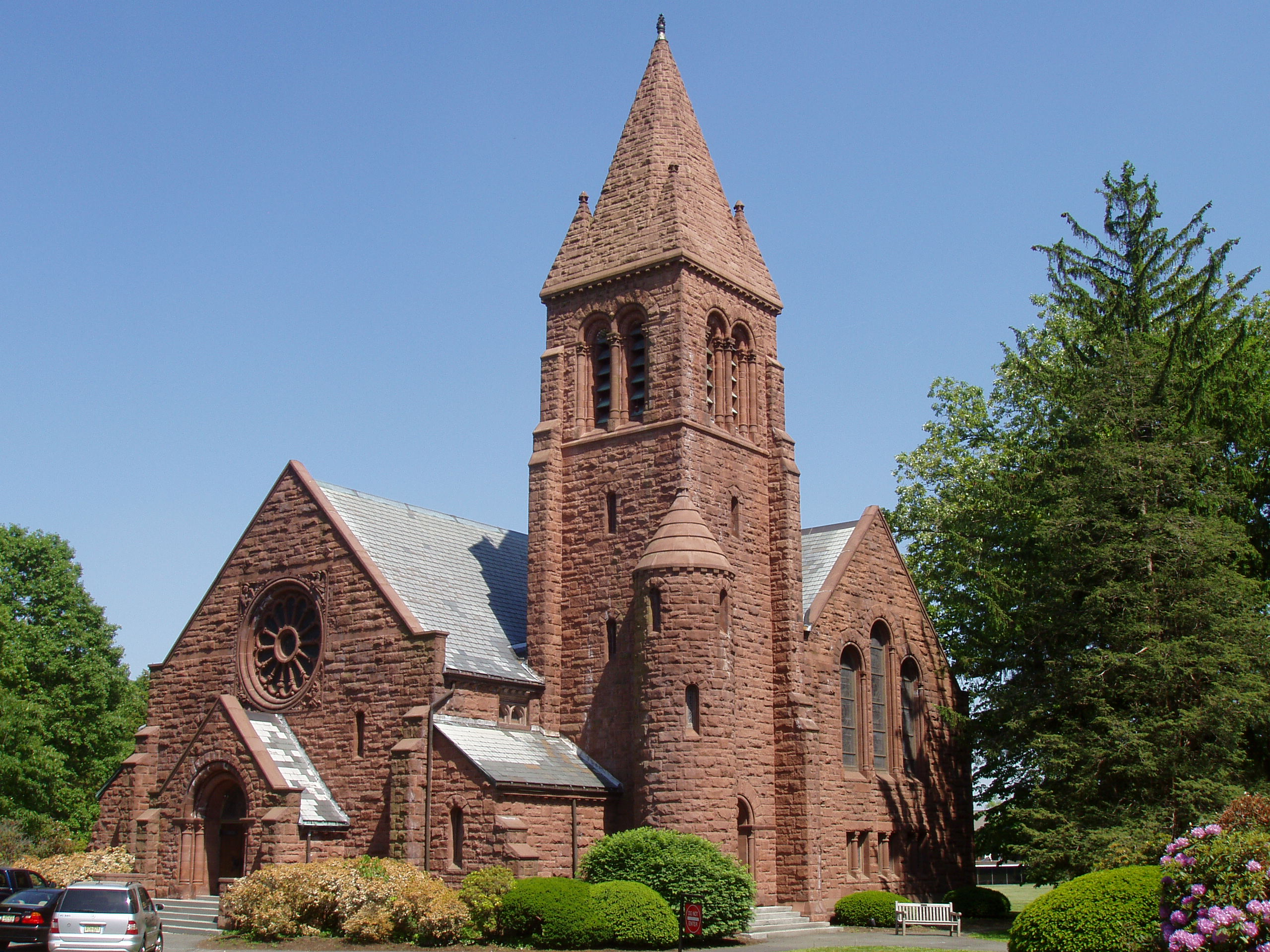
Edith Memorial Chapel at the Lawrenceville School

The school district covering the CDP is Lawrence Township Public Schools. The Lawrenceville Elementary School, one of the district's four elementary schools, is located in Lawrenceville.

Lawrenceville is home to the Lawrenceville School, a private boarding and day high school founded in 1810. It is one of the oldest and most prestigious prep schools in the United States.

== Commerce ==
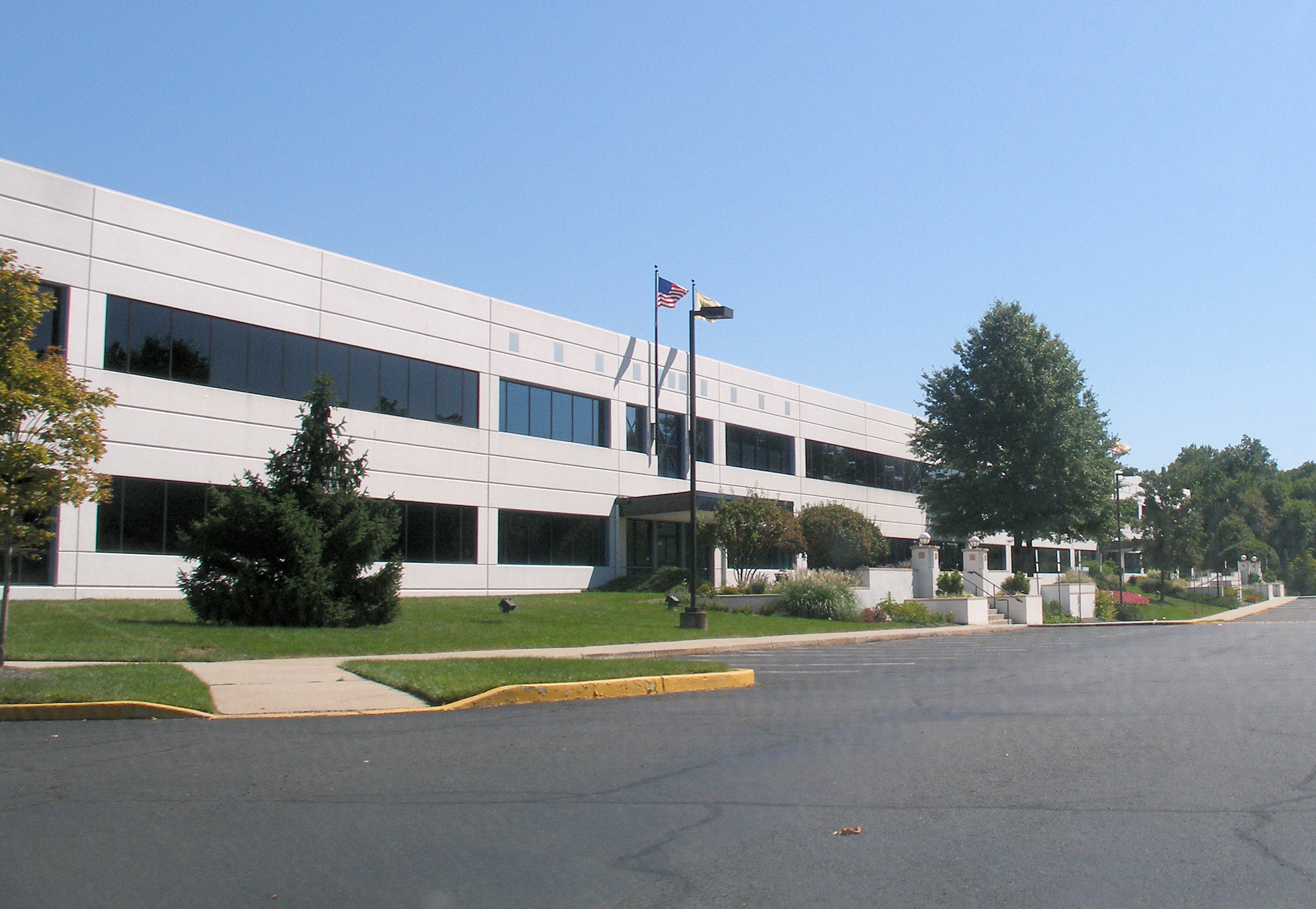
The U.S. headquarters of GS1, a global non-profit organization maintaining standards for barcodes and company prefixes

Historically, the Lawrenceville School was the dominant economic force in the village. Since World War II, Lawrenceville has become a commuter town, serving educational and corporate employment centers in Lawrence Township, in Princeton and Trenton, in the surrounding cluster of corporate and research campuses, and to a lesser extent in New York City. There are no large businesses in Lawrenceville itself, but Lawrence Township is home to several large corporate facilities outside of the village, including the world headquarters of Educational Testing Service, offices for the Lenox division of Department 56, the main research facility for Bristol Myers Squibb, and the offices of the Peterson's division of Nelnet.

The village businesses share an organization, Lawrenceville Main Street, which organizes events, such as the Music in the Park series, the annual Jubilee, and Taste of Lawrenceville, and promotes the business district to visitors. The Lawrenceville Farmers Market is held every Sunday, from about June to November.

The Lawrenceville Fire Co., Lawrenceville Water Co. (now part of Aqua America), Lawrenceville Fuel, and a U.S. Post Office are also located in Lawrenceville.

Lawrenceville was formerly home to a family grocery, hardware store, pharmacy, and, most famously, the Jigger Shop, which served generations of Lawrenceville School students as a school store and soda fountain. A fire destroyed the shop on August 10, 1990. Caused by faulty electrical cords that ran to a store refrigerator, the fire burned through the store's ceiling into the second-floor apartment, which was unoccupied . A new Jigger Shop then opened at the Lawrenceville School and was located on the first floor of the Noyes History Building, until its relocation to the Irwin Dining Center in 2011. After the demolition of the Irwin Dining Center in early 2023, the Jigger Shop was renamed to the Big Red Store and relocated to the newly built Tsai Field House.

The offices of the Princeton Area Community Foundation are in Lawrenceville.

== Notable people ==
People who were born in, residents of, or otherwise closely associated with Lawrenceville include:

- Kevin Bannon (born 1957), former basketball head coach who was the Rutgers Scarlet Knights men's basketball team's head coach from 1997 through 2001
- Ifa Bayeza (born Wanda Williams), playwright, producer and conceptual theater artist
- Dierks Bentley (born 1975), country music musician
- Brett Brackett (born 1987), former tight end for the Seattle Seahawks
- David Brearley (1745–1790), signer of the United States Constitution and Chief Justice of the New Jersey Supreme Court from 1779 to 1789
- George H. Brown (1810–1865), represented New Jersey's 4th congressional district in the United States House of Representatives from 1853 to 1855
- Scott Brunner (born 1957), former NFL quarterback
- Mark Carlson (born 1969), President, Head Coach and General Manager of the Cedar Rapids RoughRiders
- Richard J. Coffee (1925–2017), founder of Mercer County Park and a former state senator
- Cason Crane (born 1992), entrepreneur and endurance athlete who became the first openly gay mountaineer to scale the Seven Summits
- David W. Crane (born 1959), lawyer, investment banker and business executive in the energy industry, who has served as the Undersecretary for Infrastructure in the United States Department of Energy
- Oliver Crane (born 1998), rower who set the record as the youngest person to row solo across the Atlantic Ocean, when he completed the 3,000-nautical-mile (5,600 km; 3,500 mi) journey in 2018
- Isabella de la Houssaye (1964–2023), lawyer, business owner and endurance athlete best known for her six-year battle against lung cancer
- Carlos Dengler (born 1974), former Interpol bassist
- Tony DeNicola (1927–2006), jazz drummer
- Jamie Ding (born 1991), 31–game winning Jeopardy contestant, bureaucrat, and law student.
- N. Howell Furman (1892–1965), professor of analytical chemistry who helped develop the electrochemical uranium separation process as part of the Manhattan Project
- Eb Gaines (1927–2012), U.S. Consul General to Bermuda from 1989 until 1992
- Kenneth W. Keuffel (1923 –2006), American football coach who was the 25th head football coach of the Wabash Little Giants football team
- Frederick Kroesen (1923–2020), United States Army four-star general
- Dan Lavery (born 1969), musician who has performed as part of The Fray and Tonic
- James T.C. Liu (1919–1993), Chinese historian and a leading scholar on Song dynasty history who was a professor at Princeton University for more than two decades
- David S. Mao, law librarian and acting Librarian of Congress from 2015 to 2016
- Ed Moran (born 1981), long-distance runner
- John Nalbone (born 1986), American football tight end
- Jake Nerwinski (born 1994), Major League Soccer player for the Vancouver Whitecaps
- Norman Schwarzkopf (1934–2012), United States Army general who was commander of coalition forces during the Gulf War
- Jon Solomon (born 1973), DJ on WPRB
- Myles Stephens (born 1997), basketball player for Kangoeroes Mechelen
- Jon Stewart (born 1962), comedian and host of The Daily Show on Comedy Central
