= B. Russell Murphy =

Russell Murphy
- Murphy c. 1923

Biographical details
- Born: July 6, 1889; Millville, New Jersey, U.S.
- Died: July 30, 1957 (aged 68); Berkeley County, West Virginia, U.S.

Playing career

Basketball
- 1910–1911: Penn

Coaching career (HC unless noted)

Football
- 1917–1919: Johns Hopkins
- 1923: Dickinson

Basketball
- 1919–1920: Johns Hopkins
- 1920–1921: Union (NY)

Head coaching record
- Overall: 6–13–4† (football); 16–16 (basketball)

Benjamin Russell Murphy (July 6, 1889 – July 30, 1957) was an American athlete, coach, and athletics administrator during the early 20th century. A graduate of the University of Pennsylvania, he coached at numerous schools in several sports including football, basketball and track. Murphy was the first basketball coach at Johns Hopkins University. He is also one of the few college football coaches to resign during the middle of his first year of coaching at a school.

== Early life ==
Murphy grew up in Millville, New Jersey and attended Millville High School before transferring to Peddie Institute. While at Peddie he excelled in multiple sports. He played left tackle on the football team for three years and was named captain of the 1908 squad coached V. R. Ford, a former star lineman from Colgate University. In this season Peddie finished 2–3 with victories over Drexel Institute and Roman Catholic High School both of Philadelphia and losses to The Hill School, Blair Academy and Bordentown Cadets. He played guard and center on the basketball team including being named captain of the 1907–08 team under coach John Plant. As a basketball player Murphy was known for his accurate passing and for his quickness for his five feet ten inches tall and 200 lbs body. In his senior season his overall play including five field goals helped Peddie beat the Roman Catholic High School, the basketball champions of Philadelphia, 33–16. As a track and field athlete he participated in the hammer throw. In 1907 he finished second in the hammer throw at the Rutgers' Interscholastic meet.

== College career ==
Murphy graduated from the University of Pennsylvania. During his freshman year at Penn, Murphy was elected captain of the freshman football team. He also excelled as a member of the freshman basketball and track team. He lettered basketball in 1911 under head coach Charles Keinath, helping Penn to a 15–8 record including 5–3 mark in the Eastern Intercollegiate Basketball League.

== Coaching career ==
Murphy served as coach, both as a head coach and assistant coach, at numerous schools including Union College, University of Pennsylvania, Peddie Institute, St. Charles College, and Johns Hopkins University. His coaching duties included multiple sports including football, basketball and track. At Union College he served as athletic director as well as coaching both the basketball and track teams.

=== Johns Hopkins ===
In 1916 Johns Hopkins Athletic Board picked Murphy as coach for the 1917 football team. At the time of selection he was serving as the athletic director of the Gilman Country School, and was student in the College of Physicians and Surgeons in Baltimore, Maryland. In addition to his football duties, he was responsible for rebuilding of the entire athletic department at Johns Hopkins.

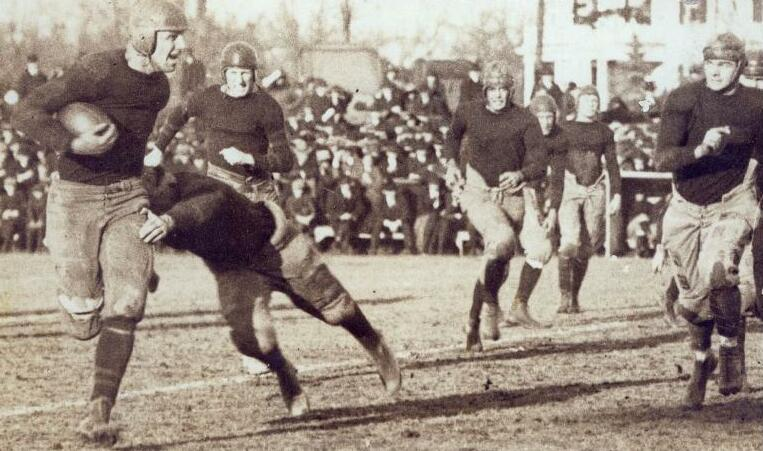
1919 game between Murphy's Johns Hopkins football team and intrastate rival, Maryland

Murphy coached three years at Johns Hopkins where he finished with a 6–11–4 record. In his first year, the 1917 team finished with a 1–6–2 record, defeating only Western Maryland College. The next year the team finished .500 with a 1–1–1 record. In his last year his 1919 team once again finished with a .500 record at 4–4–1.

Murphy was the first basketball coach at Johns Hopkins. He coached the 1919–20 squad to a 6–7 record including victories over Dartmouth and Lehigh and losses to Virginia Tech and Virginia.

=== Dickinson ===
In March 1923, Murphy was named the 17th head football coach at Dickinson College in Carlisle, Pennsylvania. Murphy was also named head of the Physical Training Department at Dickinson. He replaced future College Football Hall of Fame inductee Glenn Killinger as head football coach. Killinger had unexpectedly resigned. The official reason for the resignation was never given, but speculation was that the college administration did not like that he was also coaching a semi-pro team.

Murphy did several things before the season to help with the transition. He brought in the new players from high school and prep school to fall camp early so they could learn the system. Several football alumni were brought in to assist him in getting the team in shape. He also provided a training table at a local hotel.

Murphy only coached the first three games, all losses. Dickinson lost to a team from the United States Third Army, Navy, and Muhlenberg. In those three games Murphy's team gave up 42 points while only scoring 7. These games were also marked by lack of communication with his assistant coaches and player discontent. In the Navy game his players refused to use Murphy's plays, instead using former coach Killinger's offense. Due to these problems the Dickinson College athletic committee appointed Joseph Lightner as Field Coach which caused Murphy to resign. He was replaced by Lightner as head coach, who completed the season and went on to coach at Dickinson until the end of the 1925 season.

Murphy's overall coaching record at Dickinson was 0–3 Since the NCAA only recognizes games played against four-year degree-granting colleges, his official record at Dickinson is 0–2. This ranks him last at Dickinson in terms of total wins and winning percentage.

== Other contributions ==
Murphy's contributions included writing "Athletics in the Army" and his membership in early rules committees and as a football official in the early days of the sport.

== Head coaching record ==
=== Football ===
| Year | Team | Overall | Conference | Standing | Bowl/playoffs |
|---|---|---|---|---|---|
Johns Hopkins Blue Jays (Independent) (1917–1919)
| 1917 | Johns Hopkins | 1–6–2 | | | |
| 1918 | Johns Hopkins | 1–1–1 | | | |
| 1919 | Johns Hopkins | 4–4–1 | | | |
| Johns Hopkins: | | 6–11–4 | | | |
Dickinson Red and White (Independent) (1923)
| 1923 | Dickinson | 0–2 | | | |
| Dickinson: | | 0–2 | | | |
| Total: | | 6–13–4† | | | |

* Does not include the loss to a team US Third Army since the NCAA only recognizes games played against four-year degree-granting colleges
† incomplete
