= Hurson =

Hurson is a surname. Notable people with the surname include:

- Brendan Hurson, American lawyer
- Martin Hurson, Irish hunger striker
- Sean Hurson, Gaelic football referee
- Tess Hurson, Northern Irish poet and academic
- Tim Hurson, Canada-based speaker and writer
