= Jacqueline Reses =

American businesswoman, investor and philanthropist

- Born: Atlantic City, New Jersey
- Citizenship: American
- Education: Wharton School of the University of Pennsylvania; Peddie School
- Occupation: Business executive
- Known for: Chair and CEO of Lead Bank; Executive Chairman of Square Financial Services and Capital Lead at Square Inc.
- Children: 3

Jacqueline (Jackie) Reses (born 1969) is an American businesswoman, investor, author and philanthropist. She is the chair and CEO of Lead Bank, a state chartered bank in Kansas City, Missouri, and the CEO of Post House Capital, a private investment firm and family office. She is a member of the Kansas City Federal Reserve's Community Depository Advisory Council and the former chairman of the Economic Advisory Council of the San Francisco Federal Reserve.

== Early life and education ==
Reses was born in Atlantic City, New Jersey to Ronnie and Stephen Reses. Her father owned Reses Pharmacy in nearby Margate. In 1988, she graduated early from the Peddie School in New Jersey, spending her senior year at George Washington University. She attended the Wharton School of the University of Pennsylvania where she earned a Bachelors of Science degree in economics with honors.

== Career ==
Reses began her career at Goldman Sachs, working in the mergers and acquisitions department and later as an investor in the principal investments area between 1992 and 1999. Later she served as CEO for iBuilding, Inc., a real estate software business.

After iBuilding's sale to Realeum Software in 2001, Reses joined Apax Partners, a private equity firm with headquarters in London, England, where she ran the firm's U.S. media group. At Apax, Reses served on the boards of Cengage Learning, Intelsat, HIT Entertainment and NEP Broadcasting.

In 2012, Reses joined Yahoo! as Executive Vice President of people and development, leading hiring and HR for the company. That same year, she was appointed to the board of directors of the Alibaba Group, where she helped lead Alibaba's IPO in September 2014. As Chief Development Officer at Yahoo!, Reses led forty-one transactions between 2012 and 2014. Reses was the author of the controversial "no-work-from-home-memo" in 2013 that required Yahoo employees who work remotely to relocate and work in company offices during Marissa Mayer's time as CEO of the company.

In October 2015, Reses joined Square, Inc. to head Square Capital, the company's small-business lending program and was appointed as the Chief Human Resources Officer. In March 2020, Square became the first U.S. fintech company to receive an Industrial Loan Company charter, the first charter approved by the FDIC in over a decade. At the beginning of the COVID pandemic in 2020, Reses encouraged Treasury Secretary Steve Mnuchin to expand the U.S. government's Paycheck Protection Program to allow fintech companies like Square to give out loans to small businesses.

In 2022, Reses co-authored the book Self-Made Boss with Lauren Weinberg.

In August 2022, Reses led the acquisition of Kansas City based Lead Bank, a state regulated bank that specialises in business and personal banking, with a focus on lending and banking as a service for consumer fintechs. At the time of purchase it held $778.9 million in assets. After the acquisition Reses was named Chairman of the organisation. Lead Bank's investors include Andreessen Horowitz, Khosla Ventures, Coatue, Ribbit Capital, and Zeev Ventures. The collapse of Silicon Valley Bank led to "a flood of inbound interest" in Lead Bank and other institutions that could provide modern technological infrastructure.

In 2024, Lead Bank was named to the CNBC Disruptor 50 list, and to the Forbes Fintech 50 in 2025.

In April 2025, Lead partnered with Visa and Stripe to launch a platform allowing tech companies to issue stablecoin-linked payment cards. Reses later made news at a fintech summit, where she said the debanking of crypto companies was "a fiction, to some degree," and that there should be legislative definitions around market structure for stablecoins and cryptocurrencies.

== Boards ==
Reses served on the board of trustees and investment committee for Peddie School and the investment committee for Brearley School in New York. She has also served on the boards of Good+Foundation (formerly Baby Buggy), Citymeals-on-Wheels, and Springboard Enterprises, a non-profit networking platform for businesswomen. Reses has been on the board of the Wharton School since 2015.

In July 2020, she joined the board of Pershing Square Tontine Holdings, a special-purpose acquisition company.

As of 2021, Reses served on the boards of Nubank, Affirm Holdings, and entertainment company Endeavor.

== Family ==
Reses's brother, Jacob Reses, is Chief of Staff to Vice President JD Vance.
