= Lew Watts =

Baseball player and coach

- Pitcher
- Born: March 7, 1922
- Died: June 25, 2003 (aged 81)
- Batted: Right Threw: Right

Llewellyn Watts III (1922–2003) was a baseball player and coach in the United States. He played professionally as a pitcher for the St. Louis Browns organization and wrote a book titled The Fine Art of Baseball that was published in 1964.

Watts completed two seasons of play in the minor leagues before pitching for the Browns. He later became a baseball coach, and teacher. He was coach and mentor to Major League players Erik Hanson and Brian Meyer.

Before playing baseball professionally, Watts served aboard the USS Rich (DE-695) during World War II for the United States Navy.

Watts was a teacher and baseball coach at The Peddie School and later The Hun School.
