= Mid-Atlantic Prep League =

New Jersey and Pennsylvania high school sports league

The Mid-Atlantic Prep League, also known as the MAPL, is a sports league with participating institutions from prep schools in New Jersey and Pennsylvania in the United States. MAPL schools are allowed to have a limited number of post-graduates (student-athletes who have already graduated from high school and are taking an intermediate step between high school and college) on their rosters.

Schools competing in the league include:

School	Location	Team Name
The Peddie School	Hightstown, New Jersey	Falcons
Blair Academy	Blairstown, New Jersey	Buccaneers
The Hill School	Pottstown, Pennsylvania	Rams
Hun School of Princeton	Princeton, New Jersey	Raiders
Lawrenceville School	Lawrenceville, New Jersey	Big Red
Mercersburg Academy	Mercersburg, Pennsylvania	Blue Storm
Pennington School	Pennington, New Jersey	Red Raiders

== The MAPL Headmasters' Cup ==
In 2007, the athletic directors of the Mid-Atlantic Prep League created the Headmasters' Cup to recognize outstanding sportsmanship. The cup is awarded annually to the school that best exemplifies the qualities of good sportsmanship year-round from their student-athletes, coaches, staff and fans. Voting is conducted by each coach after each season and tabulated in the spring to determine the winner of the Headmasters' Cup.

In the four years it has been awarded, the Headmasters' Cup has been won three times by Peddie School.

MAPL Headmasters' Cup Recipients

- 2007-08 Peddie
- 2008-09 Lawrenceville
- 2009-10 Peddie
- 2010-11 Peddie

== Boys' Squash ==
The Lawrenceville School Boys' Varsity Squash Team has been the winner of the MAPL Squash Championships since 2002 with the exception of 2023, when Mercersburg took home the Championship.

== Boys' basketball ==
Blair Academy has been the dominant basketball program in recent years, compiling a 63-12 record since the league's inception in 1999 and winning 7 of the last 10 league championships.

The Hill School won the 2007-2008 MAPL Basketball league regular season championship and year-end tournament championship for the first time in school history. After winning the MAPL, Hill lost in overtime to ANC (at one point raked number #1 among prep schools) in the Pennsylvania Independent League Tournament. Hill also won the MAPL Basketball league in 2013-2014. Losing only once in the league to Hun.

The Hun School of Princeton has been one of the dominant programs in the MAPL league for years, at one point winning 4 straight championships and a state championship while placing 19 players on Division 1 rosters.

Lawrenceville has made its share of contributions to MAPL basketball excellence over the years. Notable accomplishments include the 2003-04 Lawrenceville team that went 23-4 and beat national powerhouse Saint Benedict's Preparatory School of Newark, New Jersey. All five of Lawrenceville's starters on that team went on to play Division I basketball: David Whitehurst (Penn), Joakim Noah (leading scorer for Florida), Craig Moore (Northwestern), Andrew Morrison (Bucknell) and Kashif Sweet (Columbia). In 2005-2006 Noah went on to lead Florida to a 73-57 win over UCLA for the school's first NCAA basketball title, and was named the Most Outstanding Player of the Final Four.

Mercersburg's recent basketball alumni include Ugonna Onyekwe (Penn), Stéphane Pelle (Colorado), Adam Chubb (Penn), Wes Miller (North Carolina, now head coach at UNC Greensboro), Alex Tyler (Cornell), Donya Jackson (Navy), Chall Montgomery (Navy), Dre Wills (Vermont), and Phillip McGloin (Vanderbilt).

Former Peddie star Ibrahim Jaaber was a two-time Ivy League Player of the Year at the University of Pennsylvania and now plays professionally for Italian club Pallacanestro Virtus Roma. Jaaber, a naturalized Bulgarian citizen, is also a member of the Bulgaria national basketball team. Other Peddie alums that have played collegiately include Darren Smith (Penn), Colin Aldridge (Brown), Noruwa Agho (Columbia), Steve Frankoski (Columbia), and Wesley Dickinson (Dartmouth).

== Baseball ==
Mercersburg has dominated MAPL baseball since joining the league in 2000-2001. The Storm has won nine league championships in the 14 years since. Mercersburg played in the tournament championship game eight out of 11 times. The MAPL discontinued its league tournament in 2012 and has since crowned its league champion on the basis of the regular season record. Mercersburg has won or shared the MAPL crown every year since 2011; three of those four titles were won outright, while Mercersburg and Peddie shared the 2012 conference championship.

In recent years, MAPL baseball has seen a rise in competitiveness, with several former players now playing in college and professionally. Mercersburg's Josh Edgin is a pitcher for the New York Mets. Former Peddie standout Fernando Perez played two seasons for the Tampa Bay Rays and has also spent time with minor-league affiliates of the Chicago Cubs and New York Mets. Perez was drafted in the 7th round of the 2004 amateur draft after playing for Columbia. Joseph Florio (Blair), Nick Francona (Lawrenceville), Steve Garrison (Hun), Christian Binford (Mercersburg), and James Stokes (Hill) are minor league players for the Oakland Athletics, Boston Red Sox, Milwaukee Brewers, Kansas City Royals, and Cleveland Indians respectively. Hun School graduate Mike Ford went on to play for Princeton University from 2011-2013. He is the only player in Ivy history who earned player, pitcher, and rookie of the year.

== Boys' and Girls' Tennis ==
For the second year in a row, the Blair boys team won the MAPL championship by a wide margin. They finished the past two seasons with an undefeated record. The Blair girls team finished the 2010 season undefeated (16-0) claiming the MAPL title and New Jersey State championship.

The lineup of the 2024-25 Blair Girls team includes 6 singles, and 3 doubles.

The Lawrenceville boys team won the MAPL in the 2026 season, beating Blair by 4 points and ending their two-year winning streak. Lawrenceville's Chidambaram and Lee clinched the tournament in its final minutes by winning the doubles point. Fu and Short won the third and second singles brackets, respectively.

== Boys' Soccer ==
The Hill School won the MAPL Boys' Varsity Soccer for three consecutive years since 2010. In 2013 fall boys' varsity soccer, Lawrenceville got the second place.

== Boys' Crew ==
Notable boy's crew alumni from the MAPL

- Jason Read (Hun) - Gold Medalist for USA in Athens 2004.
- Paul Teti (Hun) - Rowed in the Men's Lightweight Coxless Four in Sydney 2000 and Athens 2004 Olympic Games, as well as in the Men's Coxlees Four at the 2008 Beijing Games.

== Girls' Crew ==
Emily Tierney (Blair Academy) - Junior Olympics 2024

== Football ==
Notable football alumni from the MAPL:

- Luqman Abdallah (Hun) - University of Miami
- Michael Atunrase (Lawrenceville) - University of Delaware
- Heath Benedict (Peddie) - Tennessee/Newberry
- Derek Benson (Hun) - Purdue/Hofstra
- Shane Black (Mercersburg) - Lafayette
- David Caldwell (Lawrenceville) - William & Mary, Indianapolis Colts
- Jahan Dotson (Peddie) - Penn State, Washington Commanders
- David Dudeck (Hun) - Boston College, Seattle Seahawks
- Ben Eaton (Mercersburg) - Lafayette/Towson
- Malcolm Evans (Peddie) - La Salle
- AJ Firestone (Mercersburg) - Penn State/Wagner
- Curtis Feigt (Mercersburg) - West Virginia
- Gerverus Flagg (Mercersburg) - Georgetown
- Darius Glover (Mercersburg) - Lafayette
- Keith Hill (Lawrenceville) - William & Mary
- Jarvis Hodge (Mercersburg) - Boise State
- Junior Cabbie (Hun) - Notre Dame
- John Kane (Blair) - North Carolina State
- Eric King (Hill) - Wake Forest, 5 NFL teams
- AJ Kizekai (Blair) - Bucknell
- Dion Lewis (Blair) - University of Pittsburgh, New England Patriots
- Travis Mack (Hill) - Georgetown
- Craig McGovern (Hun) - Michigan State/Rutgers
- Shea McKeen (Hun) - South Carolina
- John Metchie III (Peddie) - Alabama, Houston Texans
- Bryan Morgan (Mercersburg) - Duke
- Tati Morris (Peddie) - Boston College
- Dom Natale (Hun) - Michigan State/Rutgers
- Grant Newsome (Lawrenceville) - Michigan
- Ted Plenkett (Peddie) - Rowan
- Ben Pooler (Lawrenceville) - Maryland
- Devon Ramsey (Lawrenceville) - UNC
- Vincent Rey (Mercersburg) - Duke, Cincinnati Bengals
- Samuel Richmond (Blair) - Colorado
- Todd Rinaldo (Hun) - Bucknell
- Sam Rodgers (Mercersburg) - Syracuse
- Myron Rolle (Hun) - Florida State, Tennessee Titans
- Charles Thompson (Mercersburg) - Bucknell
- Wellington Talkpa (Hun) - Maine
- Edwin Wagner (Peddie) - Michigan State/Delaware

== Basketball ==
Notable Alumni from the MAPL

- Luol Deng (Blair, Duke, Chicago Bulls)
- Royal Ivey (Blair, Texas, five NBA teams including Oklahoma City Thunder)
- Joakim Noah (Lawrenceville, Florida, Chicago Bulls)
- Charlie Villanueva (Blair, UConn, Milwaukee Bucks)
- Adam Chubb (Mercersburg, Penn)
- Julius Coles (Blair, Canisius)
- Doug Davis (Hun, Princeton)
- Taylor Dunn (Mercersburg, Winthrop/La Salle)
- Eghesosa Edywomni (Rice)
- Nick Gore (Hill, VMI)
- Lance Goulbourne (Hun, Vanderbilt)
- RJ Griffin (Hun, Dartmouth)
- Pat Hazel (Blair, Marquette)
- Idris Hilliard (Hun, St. Joseph's)
- Donya Jackson (Mercersburg, Navy)
- Nick Jackson (Mercersburg, Dartmouth)
- Jonathan Lee (Hun, Northeastern)
- Mike Lepore (Lawrenceville, Wake Forest)
- Matt McKillop (Hun, Davidson)
- Wes Miller (Mercersburg, James Madison/North Carolina, now head coach at UNC Greensboro)
- Chall Montgomery (Mercersburg, Navy)
- Craig Moore (Lawrenceville, Northwestern)
- Ugonna Onyekwe (Mercersburg, Penn)
- Justin Robinson (Blair, Rider)
- Noah Savage (Hun, Princeton)
- David Singleton (Hill, High Point/Marquette/Albright)
- Wellington Smith (Blair, West Virginia)
- Shamari Spears (Blair, Boston College/Charlotte)
- Alexis Wangmene (Blair, Texas)
