= Becky Selengut =

American chef and cookbook author

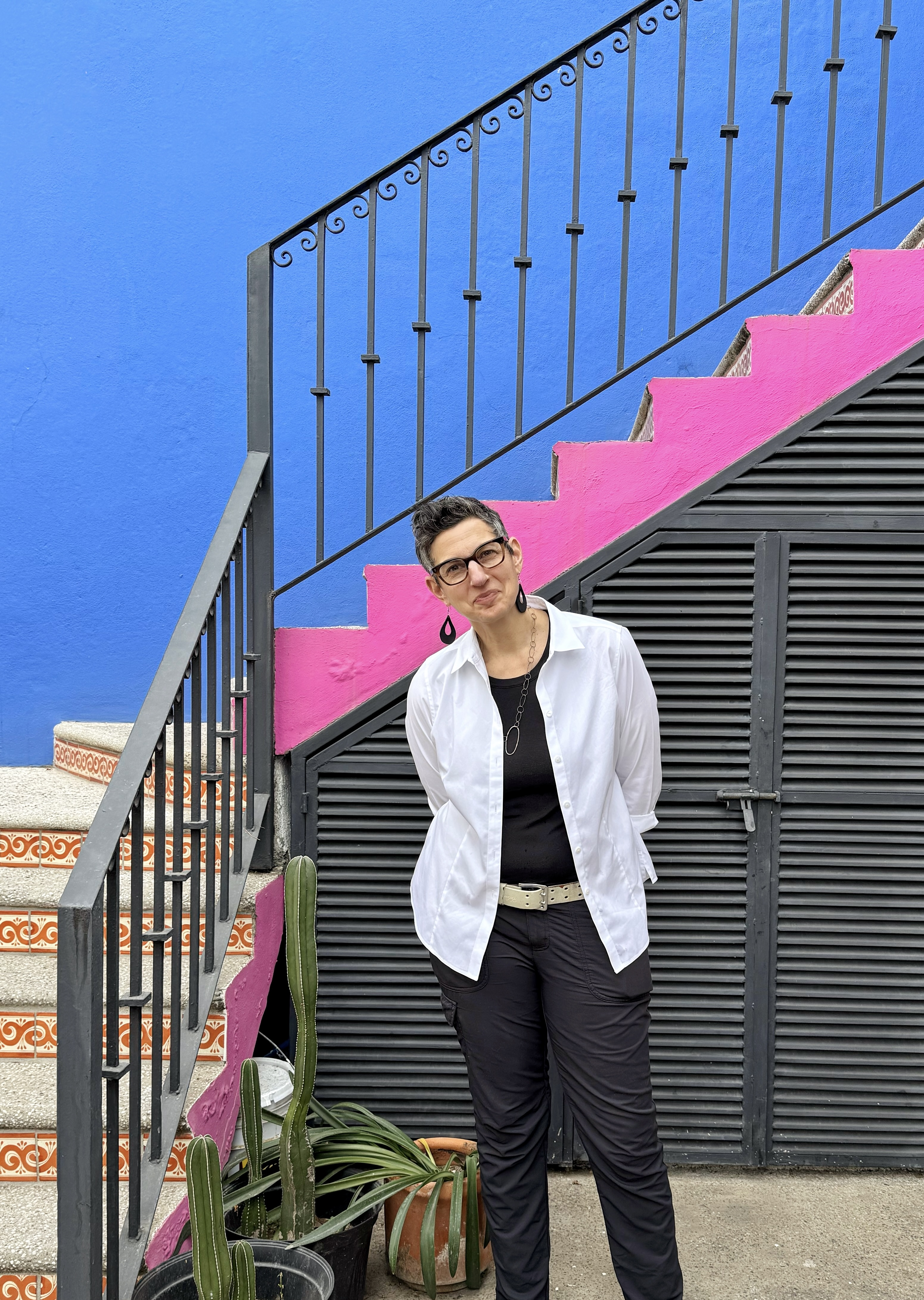
- Born: October 5, 1970 (age 56)
- Education: Hobart and William Smith Colleges; Blair Academy
- Known for: Sustainable cooking, culinary education, foraging
- Spouse: April Pogue
- Website: www.beckyselengut.com

Becky Selengut (born October 5, 1970) is an American chef, author and cooking instructor based in Seattle, Washington. Known for her work in sustainable cooking, culinary education, and foraging, Selengut has authored cookbooks, including Good Fish, Shroom, How to Taste, Misunderstood Vegetables, and Not One Shrine. She was an International Association of Culinary Professionals Award finalist for her book Good Fish.

She has also served as an adjunct professor in the Culinary and Nutrition Department at Bastyr University, taught as an instructor for PCC Natural Markets, and spent ten years teaching at The Pantry Cooking School.

She has contributed on NPR and her articles published on Serious Eats and Eating Well.

== Early life and education ==
Selengut was raised in New Jersey, where she developed an early passion for cooking inspired by her grandmother. She completed her alma mater at Blair Academy. Selengut studied sociology at Hobart and William Smith Colleges, where she was also a member of the 1989-90 William Smith Basketball roster.

Selengut's initial goal of becoming a surgeon led her to a career in public health. She later moved to Seattle from Washington, D.C., to enroll in the University of Washington's School of Medicine. She worked at a doctor's office while waiting to establish residency for in-state tuition. She became interested in culinary arts after seeing chefs in the area, eventually pursuing this new path. She graduated from the Seattle Culinary Academy with top honors in 1999.

== Career ==
After completing her studies at the Seattle Culinary Academy, Selengut worked in various Seattle restaurants, including the internationally renowned Herbfarm Restaurant, where she worked under chef Jerry Traunfeld. She also worked under Chef Sabrina Tinsley at La Spiga.

In 2004, she transitioned into private chef work and culinary education, founding her business Cornucopia, which offers private chef services and cooking classes.

In 2006, she created the educational website Seasonal Cornucopia, which provided resources on seasonal ingredients and their culinary uses.

In addition to her work as a private chef, Selengut has engaged in diverse culinary projects, such as cooking aboard a yacht, foraging tours, and working with immigrants and refugees to help them find employment in the food industry.

She has also taught cooking classes at various institutions, including Bastyr University and PCC Natural Markets.

Selengut taught at The Pantry Cooking School for 10 years, where she developed and taught courses such as the 'Misunderstood Vegetables' class.

She has authored several cookbooks, primarily focusing on sustainability, foraging, and exploring underused food items.

Selengut co-authored The Washington Local and Seasonal Cookbook in 2008, highlighting regional and seasonal ingredients. Her second book, Good Fish: Sustainable Seafood Recipes from the Pacific Coast (2011), emphasizes the importance of sustainable seafood practices and was an IACP (International Association of Culinary Professionals) book award finalist. Good Fish was also named one of the best cookbooks of 2011 by Seattle Magazine and a notable read by NPR. The book was later rereleased in an updated edition in 2018.

In 2014, Selengut published Shroom: Mind-Bendingly Good Recipes for Cultivated and Wild Mushrooms, named one of NPR's top 10 cookbooks of the year. This book explores the culinary uses of cultivated and wild mushrooms, showcasing a wide variety of flavors and textures.

She released her fifth book, How to Taste: The Curious Cook’s Handbook to Seasoning and Balance, From Umami to Acid and Beyond in 2018. The book has also been released in both Taiwanese and Chinese editions.

In 2024, Selengut released Misunderstood Vegetables, which focuses on lesser-known vegetables such as rutabaga, kohlrabi, and burdock root. The book has received critical acclaim, including a favorable review by Florence Fabricant in The New York Times.

Selengut has appeared in various media outlets, including NPR, and has written for publications such as Serious Eats and Eating Well.

She was the co-host of the Field to Fork podcast, which highlighted local food topics in the Pacific Northwest. In addition to her written work, she has also given talks and keynotes on sustainability, cooking, and foraging.

In 2010, Selengut co-hosted a podcast called Look Inside This Book Club, where she and her co-host Matthew Amster-Burton humorously reviewed romance novels based solely on their "look inside" previews.

Selengut's work reflects on sustainable cooking practices and advocates for environmental consciousness in the culinary world.

In addition to her work in cooking education, Selengut has maintained a strong connection to her alma mater, Blair Academy, where she returned in October 2019 to give a talk as part of the Society of Skeptics lecture series.

== Personal life ==
Selengut is married to April Pogue, a sommelier and general manager who previously worked at Loulay in Seattle under chef Thierry Rautureau, as well as other high-profile establishments.

== Bibliography ==
- Selengut, Becky; Sayers, Jennifer (2008). Washington Local and Seasonal Cookbook. Lone Pine International. p. 192. ISBN 9789768200464.
- Selengut, Becky (2018). Good fish: 100 sustainable seafood recipes from the Pacific Coast. Seattle: Sasquatch Books. ISBN 978-1-63217-107-8.
- Selengut, Becky (2014). Shroom: Mind-bendingly Good Recipes for Cultivated and Wild Mushrooms. Andrews McMeel Publishing. p. 240. ISBN 978-1449448264.
- Selengut, Becky; Amster-Burton, Matthew (2016). Not One Shrine: Two Food Writers Devour Tokyo. CreateSpace. p. 154. ISBN 978-1532858604.
- Selengut, Becky (2018). Good Fish: 100 Sustainable Seafood Recipes from the Pacific Coast. Erscheinungsort nicht ermittelbar: Sasquatch Books. p. 336. ISBN 978-1-63217-107-8.
- Selengut, Becky (2018). How to Taste: The Curious Cook's Handbook to Seasoning and Balance, from Umami to Acid and Beyond--With Recipes. Erscheinungsort nicht ermittelbar: Sasquatch Books. ISBN 978-1-63217-105-4.
- Selengut, Becky; Barboza, Clare (2024). Misunderstood vegetables: how to fall in love with sunchokes, rutabaga, eggplant, and more. New York, NY: Countryman Press, an imprint of W. W. Norton & Company. ISBN 978-1-68268-803-8. OCLC 1416705393.
