= Michael D. Dingman =

American businessman

- Born: September 29, 1931; New Haven, Connecticut, United States
- Died: October 3, 2017 (aged 86); Lyford Cay, New Providence Island, the Bahamas
- Education: University of Maryland - did not graduate
- Occupations: Businessman, Investor, and Philanthropist
- Known for: President and CEO of Shipston Group Limited

Michael David Dingman (September 29, 1931 – October 3, 2017) was an international investor, businessman and philanthropist. He was President of Shipston Group Ltd., a private equity company based in Nassau, Bahamas.

== Early life ==
Dingman was born in New Haven, Connecticut, on September 29, 1931. Following his early education at The Hun School in Princeton, New Jersey, Dingman enrolled at the University of Maryland, joining the Theta Chi fraternity. At the age of 20, he left the university prior to graduating to work for the Wall Street investment firm Burnham & Company.

== Career ==
Dingman became a Burnham partner in 1970 and was assigned to the initial public stock offering (IPO) of the predecessor of Temple-Inland Inc. While at Burnham, he also became president and chief executive officer of Equity Corp.

In 1972, Dingman combined Wheelabrator industrial-cleaning and air-pollution-control units with Frye Copysystems, a manufacturer of printing inks and carbon paper, to create Wheelabrator-Frye Inc. He became chief executive officer of the new company, a position he held until 1983, when Wheelabrator was acquired by The Signal Companies, an aerospace and industrial firm based in La Jolla, Calif. Dingman then became Signal's president.

Allied Corporation and Signal merged in 1985, and in 1986, 35 units of the combined company were spun off as The Henley Group, headed by Dingman. He built on the most profitable of these companies and sold the rest. Henley's IPO raised $1.2 billion.

Dingman was known to be a wheeler-dealer operator who ran Henley Group in a manner that benefited him more than his shareholders.

Henley's Wheelabrator Technologies (now a unit of Waste Management, Inc.) was a leading company in the waste-to-energy market. Fisher Scientific International Inc. completed more than 60 acquisitions after becoming a public company in 1991. It merged with Thermo Electron Corporation in 2006. Now doing business as Thermo Fisher Scientific, the company reported 2009 revenues of more than $10 billion.

== Investments ==
Starting in the 1990s, Dingman expanded investments internationally, beginning in the Czech Republic. In partnership with Czech criminal financier Viktor Kožený and under the umbrella of paper giant Stratton Company, which he headed, Dingman invested $100 million of his own money into newly privatized utilities and other companies.

He then invested in Russia and other countries of the former Soviet bloc. In Russia, Shipston joined a consortium investing in OAO SIDANCO, Russia's 5th largest oil & gas company and Rusia Petroleum, the developer of the Kovyktinskaya gas condensate field. Shipston later sold its interest in OAO SIDANCO to BP and Tyumen Oil Company (TNK).

Dingman was also a major shareholder in Segezha Pulp and Paper, later sold to AssiDoman AB, a Swedish company. Other activities ranged from property investments to the Russian water company Saint Springs, later sold to Nestle. Dingman and Shipston also became the founding venture investors in Renaissance Capital, one of Russia’s leading investment companies. Shipston was also a member of an investment consortium that acquired a minority interest in the telecom OAO Svyazinvest.

== Other business activities ==
Shipston later heavily invested in mainland China, focusing on its internal growth and consumption, and continued to invest in a range of industries. With offices in Nanjing and Beijing, the company acquired a portfolio of businesses in education (primary, secondary and trade schools), medical technologies and heavy industry. Among the Chinese companies in which Shipston had a vested interest were Genscript Holdings, a multinational biotech and pharmaceuticals company, and Hubei Modern Balloch Development Co., a large real-estate development firm.

Dingman was a director of Ford Motor Company (21 years), and of Time Inc. and then Time Warner Inc. (24 years), and served as a director of Mellon Bank Corporation, Temple Industries Inc., Temple-Inland Inc., Continental Telephone Company and Teekay Shipping Corporation.

== Philanthropy ==
Michael Dingman and his wife, Elizabeth Tharp Dingman, rebuilt the Lyford Cay School near their home in the Bahamas, where their children attended. Together, over a number of years, they doubled its class size and helped it attain international accreditation.

In 1989, Dingman endowed the eponymous Michael D. Dingman Center for Entrepreneurship at the R.H. Smith School of Business at the University of Maryland, the school he attended.

He is a benefactor and former trustee of the John A. Hartford Foundation and of Boston Museum of Fine Arts.

== Personal life ==
In 1995, Dingman renounced U.S. citizenship to become a citizen of the Bahamas.

Dingman died on October 3, 2017, at his home in Lyford Cay. He was survived by his wife Elizabeth, their three children, and three other children from a previous marriage.
