= Branson DeCou =

- Born: October 20, 1892; Philadelphia, Pennsylvania, U.S.
- Died: December 12, 1941 (aged 49); New Jersey, U.S.
- Known for: Photography and Dream Pictures
- Spouse: Elsie Vera Stanley

Branson DeCou (October 20, 1892 – December 12, 1941) was an American photographer and traveler. He traveled the world extensively and is known for his unique portrayal of "Dream Pictures" – photographic slides accompanied by musical compositions.

== Biography ==
DeCou was born on October 20, 1892 in Philadelphia. His family moved to New Jersey, where he attended Blair Academy in Blairstown. Upon graduating in 1910, Branson entered the Stevens Institute of Technology where he further developed his interest in photography, although Branson would leave the institute a year later. Branson gained recognition from a leading American photographic distributor, Underwood & Underwood, after taking a series of night photographs at the 1915 San Francisco World's Fair, which were considered for publication.

Encouraged by his success, Branson embarked on a journey throughout the United States, lecturing to local community organizations about his travels by using a projector and up to 150 hand-painted slides synchronized with music. He called these shows "dream pictures", and, encouraged by their success across the United States, was encouraged to travel the world and make more of his travelogues. Branson traveled extensively across the world, including western Europe, north Africa, Asia, Oceania, and the Caribbean. In 1930, Branson visited the Soviet Union and made a series of photographs of Moscow and Leningrad. Two years later, traveling to Moscow and Leningrad again, he was briefly arrested for suspicious filming of the city center. In March 1932, Branson married his second wife Elsie Vera Stanley, with whom he traveled extensively and replaced Branson every other day during longer performances.

A resident of East Orange, New Jersey, Branson DeCou died on December 12, 1941, from a heart attack at his mother's home in New Jersey. His wife Elsie continued to perform after his death. After encouragement from her friend and photographer, Ansel Adams, she donated Branson's slides to the University of California, which they received in 1971. Elsie died in 1997 at the age of 96.
