= Ryan Van Demark =

American football player (born 1998)

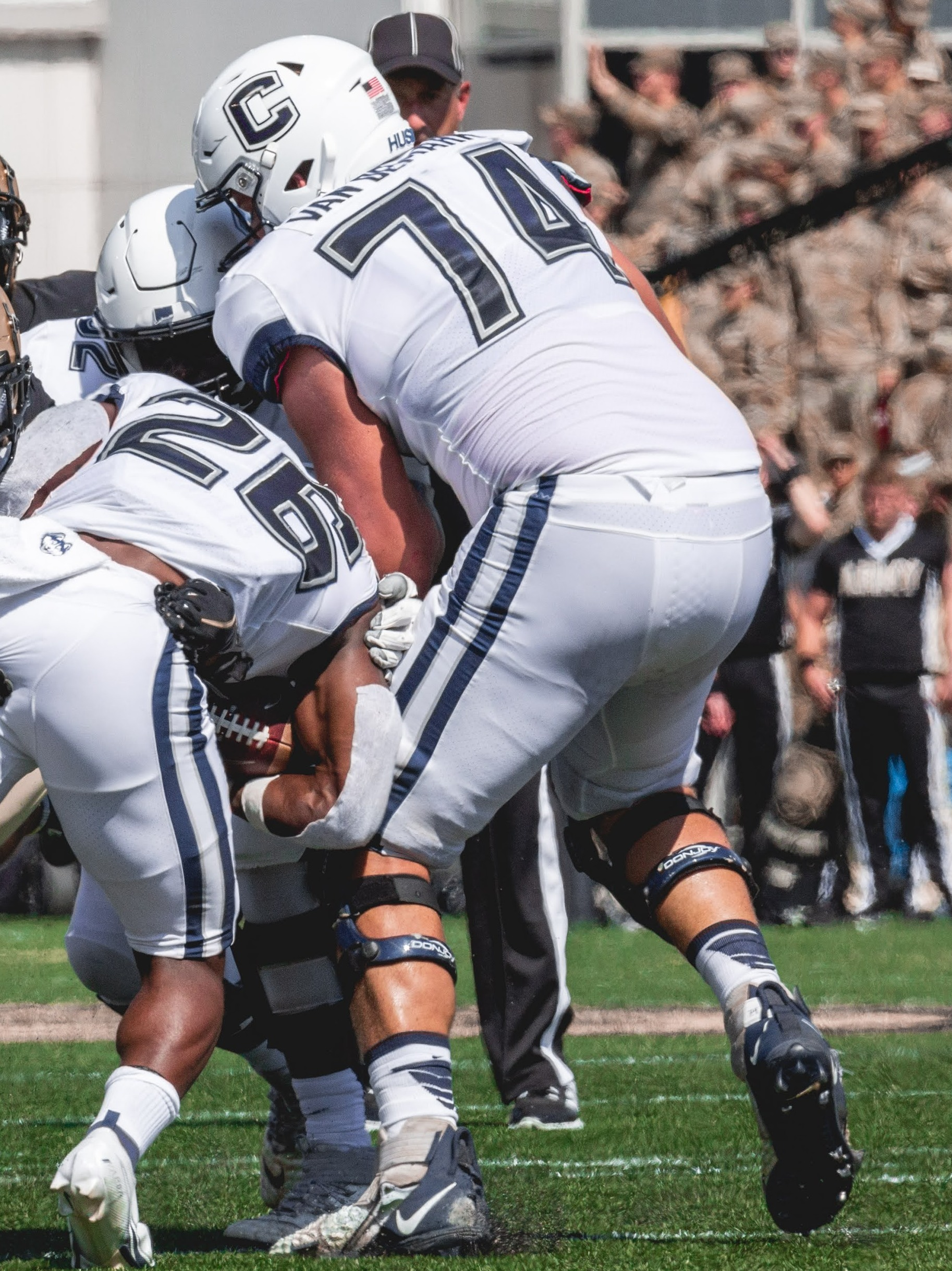
- Van Demark with UConn in 2021

No. 72 – Minnesota Vikings
- Position: Offensive tackle
- Roster status: Active

Personal information
- Born: March 22, 1998 (age 28); Wayne, New Jersey, U.S.
- Listed height: 6 ft 7 in (2.01 m)
- Listed weight: 307 lb (139 kg)

Career information
- High school: Hun of Princeton (Princeton, New Jersey)
- College: UConn (2017–2021)
- NFL draft: 2022: undrafted

Career history
- Indianapolis Colts (2022); Buffalo Bills (2022–2025); Minnesota Vikings (2026–present)

Career NFL statistics as of Week 10, 2026
- Games played: 52
- Games started: 7
- Stats at Pro Football Reference

Ryan William Van Demark (born March 22, 1998) is an American professional football offensive tackle for the Minnesota Vikings of the National Football League (NFL). He played college football for the UConn Huskies.

Van Demark grew up in Wayne, New Jersey, and played prep football and volleyball at Wayne Valley High School. After graduating in 2016, he spent a postgraduate year at the Hun School of Princeton to help further develop his skills as a football player before starting college.

== College career ==
Van Demark started 43 games for the UConn Huskies, most of them coming at left tackle.

== Professional career ==
Pre-draft measurables
Height	Weight	Arm length	Hand span	Wingspan	40-yard dash	10-yard split	20-yard split	20-yard shuttle	Three-cone drill	Vertical jump	Broad jump	Bench press
6 ft 6 1/2 in (1.99 m)	307 lb (139 kg)	35 3/4 in (0.91 m)	10 3/8 in (0.26 m)	7 ft 1 5/8 in (2.17 m)	5.27 s	1.75 s	2.97 s	4.54 s	7.50 s	30.5 in (0.77 m)	9 ft 4 in (2.84 m)	24 reps
All values from Pro Day

=== Indianapolis Colts ===
After not being selected in the 2022 NFL draft, Van Demark signed with the Indianapolis Colts as an undrafted free agent. However Van Demark, was waived during final roster cuts.

=== Buffalo Bills ===
On September 6, 2022, Van Demark signed with the Buffalo Bills practice squad. On January 23, 2023, Van Demark signed a reserve/future contract with the Bills.

Van Demark made the Bills' initial 53-man roster for the 2023 season. He appeared in 12 games in the 2023 season. He appeared in 14 games and started two in the 2024 season.

=== Minnesota Vikings ===
On March 20, 2026, Van Demark signed a one-year, $4.2 million contract with the Minnesota Vikings.
