= Joseph Lightner =

American football player and coach (1900–1988)

Biographical details
- Born: July 25, 1900; Marysville, Pennsylvania, U.S.
- Died: June 6, 1988 (aged 87); Middletown, Pennsylvania, U.S.

Playing career

Football
- 1920–1921: Penn State
- 1922: Frankford Yellow Jackets

Baseball
- 1919–1922: Penn State
- 1923–1924: Reading Keystones
- 1926: Harrisburg Senators
- Positions: Halfback (football); Outfielder (baseball)

Coaching career (HC unless noted)

Football
- 1923–1925: Dickinson

Head coaching record
- Overall: 17–7–2

Joseph Keith Lightner (July 25, 1900 – June 6, 1988) was an American football player and coach. He served as the 18th head football coach at Dickinson College in Carlisle, Pennsylvania and he held that position for three seasons, from 1923 until 1925. His record at Dickinson was 17–7–2. Lightner took over the second half of the 1923 season after B. Russell Murphy resigned with an 0–2 start.

== Professional athlete ==
Lightner played football professionally in 1922 for the Frankford Yellow Jackets before the team joined the National Football League. He also played baseball professionally for the Reading team in the International League from 1921 (as "William Lightner") to 1925.
