= E. Norman Veasey =

American judge (born 1933)

Eugene Norman Veasey (born January 9, 1933) is a former Chief Justice of the Delaware Supreme Court.

Born in Wilmington, Delaware, Veasey attended the local schools, before completing his secondary education at the Peddie School, and receiving a B.A. from Dartmouth College in 1954, and an LL.B. from the University of Pennsylvania in 1957. From his admission to the Delaware bar in 1958 until 1993, Veasey practiced was the law firm of Richards, Layton & Finger. There, he became a partner in 1963, managing partner in the 1970s, and president of the firm in the mid-1980s.

In 1992, Veasey was nominated by Governor Michael N. Castle to a seat as Chief Justice of the Delaware Supreme Court. He was unanimously confirmed by the Delaware State Senate, and was invested as chief justice on April 7, 1992. Veasey stepped down from the court in May, 2004.
