= Lexie Gerson =

American basketball player

Personal information
- Listed height: 5 ft 11 in (1.80 m)

Career information
- High school: Peddie School (NJ)
- College: Virginia (2009-2014)
- Position: Guard

Career highlights
- 2x ACC All-Defensive Team

Lexie Gerson is an American basketball player. She played college basketball for the Virginia Cavaliers women's basketball team, where she was a two-time ACC All-Defensive team selection.

== Early life ==
Gerson's hometown is Fort Washington, Pennsylvania. Gerson attended high school at the Peddie School in New Jersey.

== College career ==
Gerson played college basketball at the University of Virginia, where she twice earned ACC All-Defensive team honors. She was the ACC's steals per game leader in the 2013–14 season.

As a freshman in the 2009–10 season, Gerson averaged 5.0 points, 1.6 rebounds, 0.9 assists, and 1.0 steals per game. The Cavaliers appeared in the 2010 NCAA Division I women's basketball tournament, losing to #12 Green Bay in the 1st round.

In her sophomore year, Gerson averaged 5.5 points, 1.9 rebounds, 1.0 assists and 1.1 steals per game.

As a junior, Gerson was a member of the 2012 ACC All-Defensive team and was named the team's Best Defensive Player. She averaged 9.5 points, 3.8 rebounds, 2.6 assists, and 3.1 steals per game.

Gerson missed the 2012–13 season due to hip surgery.

As a senior in the 2013–14 season, Gerson averaged 8.4 points, 5.0 rebounds, 2.5 assists, and 2.7 steals per game. She earned the second All-Defensive team honor of her career. She led the ACC in steals at 2.7 per game. Gerson finished her collegiate career in fifth place in Virginia's all-time steals list at 257 steals. She played her last college game on March 6, 2014, in a 77–76 conference tournament loss to Georgia Tech.

== Honors ==
She is an inductee into the Philadelphia Jewish Sports Hall of Fame.
