= Brian Meyer (baseball) =

American baseball player (born 1963)

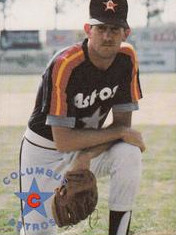
- Meyer in 1988
- Pitcher
- Born: January 29, 1963 (age 63); Camden, New Jersey
- Batted: Right Threw: Right

MLB debut
- September 3, 1988, for the Houston Astros

Last MLB appearance
- October 2, 1990, for the Houston Astros

MLB statistics
- Games pitched: 34
- Win–loss record: 0–5
- Earned run average: 2.84
- Strikeouts: 26
- Stats at Baseball Reference

Teams
- Houston Astros (1988–1990)

Brian Scott Meyer (born January 29, 1963) is an American former professional baseball pitcher. He played in Major League Baseball (MLB) for the Houston Astros from 1988 to 1990.

== Biography ==
A native of Camden, New Jersey, Meyer's high school coach was former minor league baseball player Lew Watts. Meyer attended Rollins College. In 1985, he played collegiate summer baseball with the Harwich Mariners of the Cape Cod Baseball League and was named a league all-star. He was selected by the Astros in the 16th round of the 1986 MLB draft.
