= Shawn Tully =

American business journalist

- Born: Shawn Peter Tully; 1948 (age 77–78)
- Education: Princeton University (BA – English literature) Université Catholique de Louvain (Masters – Applied Economics) University of Chicago (MBA – Finance)
- Occupations: Journalist and Senior Editor-at-Large
- Years active: July 1979–present
- Employer: Fortune Magazine
- Known for: Coining the acronym: "HENRYs" (High Earners Not Rich Yet)

Shawn Peter Tully (born 1948) is an American business journalist at Fortune magazine. Tully is one of the two Fortune Senior Editors-at-Large, along with Geoffrey Colvin. In 2003, Tully coined the acronym "HENRYs" (High Earners Not Rich Yet), to characterize a demographic of Americans in lucrative professions who encounter difficulties accumulating substantial wealth.

== Early life and education ==
Raised in Princeton, New Jersey, Tully completed his secondary education at the Hun School of Princeton, where he played basketball and tennis and was senior class president, graduating with distinction in 1966. Subsequently, Tully pursued higher education at Princeton University, earning a Bachelor of Arts degree in English literature in 1970; his undergraduate thesis was Fortune and Providence in Tom Jones, Joseph Andrews and Amelia. Continuing his academic endeavors, he obtained a Master of Business Administration (MBA) from the University of Chicago Graduate School of Business (The Booth School of Business). In 1973, Tully furthered his studies by attaining a Masters of Applied Economics from the Université Catholique de Louvain in Belgium.

== Career ==
Tully worked for First National City Bank (Citibank) in New York City, then for Garden State Land Co. In 1976, Tully shifted direction and became a freelance writer, contributing frequently to New Jersey Monthly. From 1979 to early 1983, Tully worked for Fortune in New York City, first as a reporter, then as Associate Editor. As an outside project, he co-authored the book Sports Illustrated Tennis with coach Doug McCurdy. While a reporter, Tully assisted two Fortune writers, Carol J. Loomis on ITT chief Harold Geneen's disastrous investment in a rayon mill in Quebec, and Roy Rowan on three pieces on brothers Bunker and Herbert Hunt following the collapse in silver prices.

In January 1983, Tully moved to France, as Paris Bureau Chief, for Fortune International. His CEO profiles while in Europe included pieces on construction titan Francis Bouygues and the prime figure in building L'Oreal, Francois Dalle. Following the indictment of commodities trader Marc Rich in the U.S., Tully wrote three articles on Rich, while he was living and working in Switzerland as a fugitive, starting with the cover story “Secrets of Marc Rich” co-authored with Ford Worthy. In the late 1980s, when the Vatican was dealing with the Banco Ambrosiano scandal, Tully wrote the cover story "The Vatican's Finances." An examination of pay for European versus U.S. CEOs revealed that the chiefs of such companies as Peugeot (Stellantis) and Rhône-Poulenc (Hoechst AG) earned far less than their American counterparts.

In 1989, Tully became European Editor. That year, he wrote “The Coming Boom in Europe,” predicting that new, free market reforms would lift the EU's growth rate. His forecast proved incorrect, as the EU's GDP declined in the early 1990s.

Tully returned to New York City in 1991 and continued writing for Fortune, as associate editor. Pursuing his focus on c-suite profiles, he wrote “The Super CFOs” on Stephen Bollenbach of Disney, Dennis Dammerman of General Electric Co. (GE), and several other prominent CFOs, followed in 1993 by an examination of how CEOs including Roberto Goizueta of Coca-Cola had adopted Economic Value Added (EVA) as a key metric for measuring profitability. That year, Tully contributed an account of Donald Trump’s comeback from near bankruptcy several years earlier, the disastrous partnership between Northwest Airlines and KLM of the Netherlands in “The Alliance from Hell”, and first of several articles examining America's chronic shortage of doctors. A 1995 story predicted that Lehman Bros. would have difficulty surviving as an independent company.

In September 1996, Tully left Fortune to work as an on-air reporter for CNBC, returning to Fortune in January 1998 as associate editor.

Tully was promoted to Senior Editor-at-Large in 2010.

During Donald Trump's first presidential campaign, Tully asserted in Fortune that Trump had significantly overstated his income in federal election disclosures, and exaggerated his net worth in public statements. The next year, Tully wrote a critique of President Trump's economic policies predicting that his recommendations for higher tariffs and other restrictions on free trade could curb economic growth.

== Birth of the HENRYs ==
Tully coined "The HENRYs" in an article in the June 23, 2003, issue of Fortune. He predicted that the Alternative Minimum Tax (AMT) could claw back a large portion of the cuts in federal income tax rates enacted that year, which included reductions for individuals and families with high incomes. In an October 2008 Fortune story, Tully returned to the HENRYs theme, describing the HENRYs as families and individuals earning, at that time, between $250,000 and $500,000 a year. In outside articles characterizing the HENRYs, that bracket has been changed. Tully stated that the HENRYs devote the vast bulk of their incomes to three expenses: taxes, housing and savings towards a private college education for their children. The size of those expenses, he says, leaves relatively modest amounts for retirement savings. Hence, he concluded that by retirement, the HENRYs are unlikely to accumulate sufficient net worth to be considered "rich". The group includes such professions as doctors, lawyers, consultants, small business owners, and corporate executives. Tully called the HENRYs "the bulk of the professional and entrepreneurial class that drives the economy". In 2019, the New York Post described its version “millennial HENRYs” as living “paycheck to paycheck.”

The term "HENRYs" has appeared in a number of articles and reference sources that discuss the characteristics of this cohort, which earns mid-six-figure incomes but struggles to accumulate high savings.
