= Stephen Polin =

American artist (1947–2024)

Stephen Polin (1947 - 2024) was an American artist.

He was born to a Russian Jewish family in 1947 and attended the Hun School of Princeton, from which he graduated in 1965. His work is most famous for his surrealist paintings. His work has been exhibited worldwide, including at the Bodley Gallery. His most recent projects have been commissioned by the owners of Smarty Jones and Mercedes-Benz. Stephen Polin uses the signature S.P. Xyxx on work subsequent to 1979. His styles now have incorporated elements of impressionism as well as photorealism. Stephen Polin died on May 1, 2024.

== See also ==
- Bodley Gallery
- The Hun School
