= Peddie School =

Prep school in Hightstown, New Jersey, United States

The Peddie School
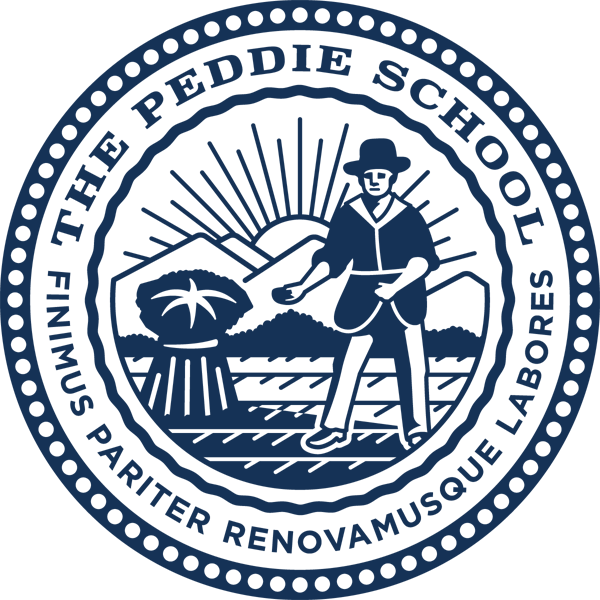

Location
- 201 South Main Street; Hightstown, Mercer County, New Jersey 08520; United States; 40.264°N 74.522°W

Information
- Type: Private, Boarding
- Motto: Finimus Pariter Renovamusque Labores; We finish our labors only to begin anew
- Religious affiliation: founded as American Baptist
- Established: 1864; 162 years ago
- NCES School ID: 00868746
- Head of school: James Hamilton
- Faculty: 71.8 FTEs
- Grades: 9–12 and post-graduate
- Enrollment: 516 (as of 2023–24)
- Student to teacher ratio: 7.2:1
- Campus: Suburban, 280 acres (110 ha)
- Colors: Blue and Gold
- Athletics conference: Mid-Atlantic Prep League
- Team name: Falcons
- Rival: Blair Academy
- Accreditation: Middle States Association of Colleges and Schools
- Publication: Amphion (literary magazine)
- Newspaper: Peddie News
- Endowment: $451 million
- School fees: $1,340
- Tuition: $63,500 day $72,800 boarding (2023-24)
- Website: www.peddie.org

The Peddie School is a non-denominational, coeducational college preparatory school located on a 280-acre (110 ha) campus in Hightstown, New Jersey, United States that serves boarding and day students in the ninth through twelfth grades, as well as post-graduates. The school has been accredited by the Middle States Association of Colleges and Schools Commission on Elementary and Secondary Schools since 1928.

As of the 2023–24 school year, the school had an enrollment of 516 students and 71.8 classroom teachers (on an FTE basis), for a student–teacher ratio of 7.2:1. For the 2023–24 school year, the school had an acceptance rate of 22%. Sixty-two percent of students resided on campus, and the average class size was 12.

== History ==
The Peddie School was founded in 1864 as the Hightstown Female Seminary, an American Baptist school. Later that year, boys were admitted and it changed its name for the first time, to New Jersey Classical and Scientific Institute. In 1872, it became the Peddie Institute in honor of philanthropist and politician Thomas B. Peddie, who gave the school $25,000 (equivalent to $672,000 in 2025). In 1923, the school was formally renamed the Peddie School.

Peddie remained coeducational until 1908, when, for social and economic reasons, it decided to begin admitting only boys. This decision was reversed in 1970 when girls began to be admitted again. The following year, Peddie's first female African-American student enrolled in the fall term.

In 1983, Walter Annenberg, class of 1927, made a gift of $12 million (equivalent to $38.8 million in 2025) to Peddie, the largest donation to a secondary school at the time. Ten years later in 1993, Ambassador Annenberg topped his gift when he made the groundbreaking donation of $100 million (equivalent to $222.9 million in 2025), allowing it to expand its facilities, financial aid, and teachers' compensation and housing; prior to the Annenberg donation, the school's endowment totaled $17 million.

It is a member of Mid-Atlantic Boarding School Group (MABS).

=== Heads of School ===
Heads of school include:

- Edgar and Edwin Haas (1865–1868)
- Hiram A. Pratt (1869–1875)
- Laroy F. Griffin (1875–1876)
- E. P. Bond (1876–1877)
- E. J. Avery (1881)
- John Greene (1882–1889)
- Herbert Ellsworth Slaught (1889–1892)
- Joseph E. Perry (1892–1898)
- Roger W. Swetland (1898–1934)
- Wilbour E. Saunders (1935–1949)
- Carrol O. Morong (1949–1964)
- Albert L. Kerr (1964–1977)
- F. Edward Potter Jr. (1977–1988)
- Anne L. Seltzer (1988–1989)
- Thomas A. Degray (1989–2001)
- John F. Green (2001–2013)
- Peter A. Quinn (2013–2025)
- James A. Hamilton (2025-present)

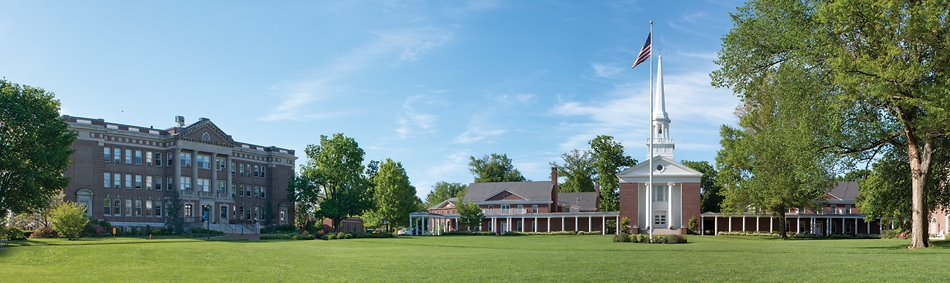
Peddie Center Campus

== Academics ==
Peddie utilizes a trimester program, in which the academic year is divided into Fall, Winter, and Spring terms that each consist of roughly 10 weeks. Classes run from Monday to Friday with Saturday classes every other week.

Many courses offered at Peddie are full-year courses, running from Fall to Spring term, with electives running for one to two terms. The majority of students take five or six courses each term. Select students may take seven courses at a time. Students take a required curriculum of English, history, mathematics, and science courses, as well as arts and foreign language courses required to graduate. They supplement these with electives of their choosing in fields of interest. Additionally, Peddie students are required to participate in after-school activities throughout the year, including sports, theater productions, volunteer opportunities, and clubs.

=== Signature Experience Program ===
Peddie offers a signature experience to all students that allows them to conduct research in subjects including STEM, language, creative writing, computer science, Asian studies, the arts, and any interdisciplinary interests. Students begin to design their program during their junior year, with them conducting research and traveling during the summer between their junior and senior years. Each year, students who participate in programs present their research to students and faculty during their senior year.

=== Testing Scores ===
The class of 2025’s average SAT score was 1450. Peddie offers 35 subjects for Advanced Placement (AP). In the 2024-2025 school year, 292 students participated in AP classes and exams. The average score on AP exams for a Peddie student is 4.53; 98% of Peddie students scored above a 3 on their AP exams.

== Athletics ==
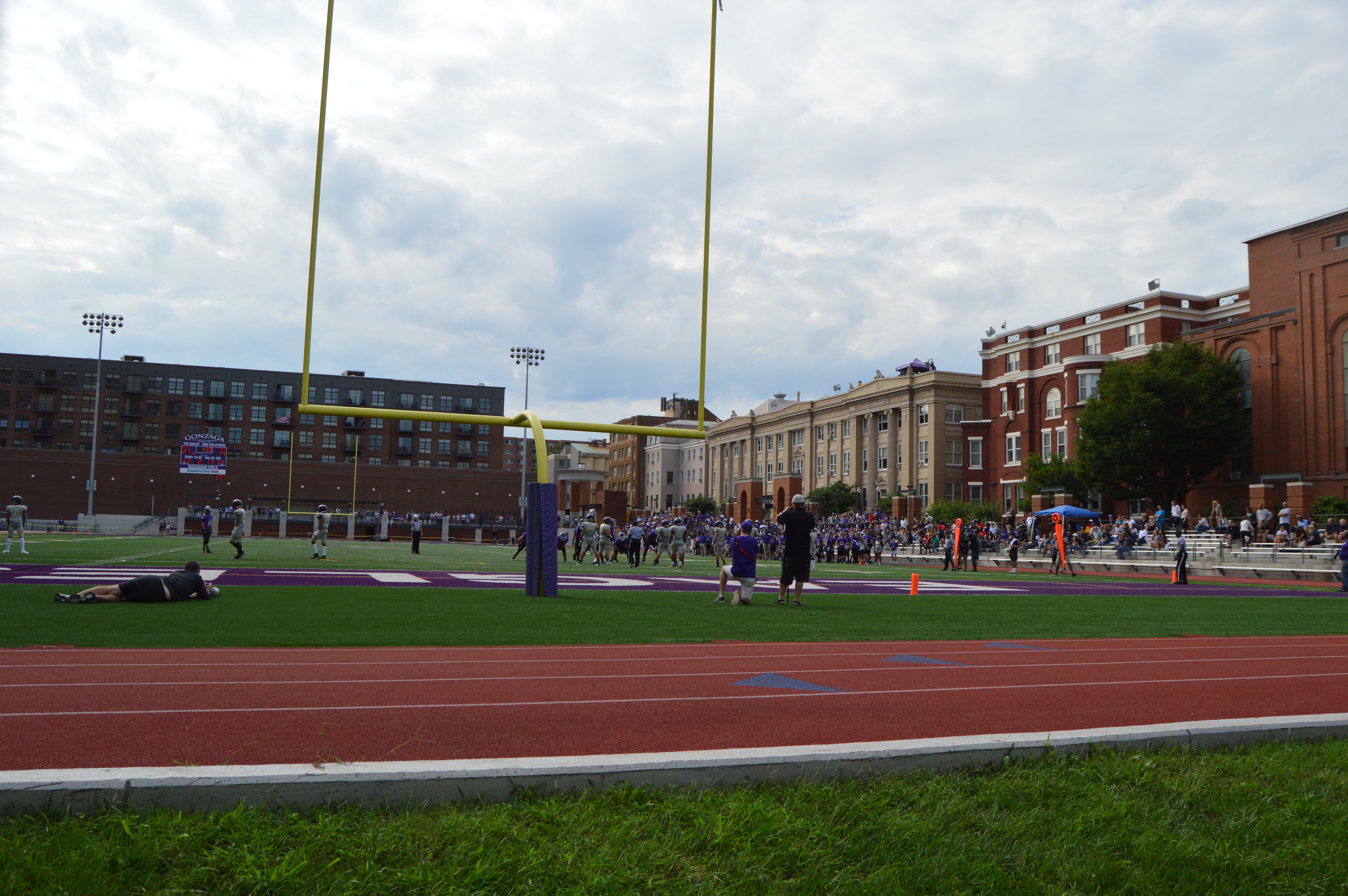
Peddie's football team visits Gonzaga College High School in Washington, D.C.

Peddie competes in the "Prep A" division of the New Jersey Independent School Athletic Association (NJISAA), with The Lawrenceville School, Hun School of Princeton, Blair Academy, Saint Benedict's Preparatory School and other New Jersey preparatory schools depending on the sport. Peddie has graduates competing at the collegiate level in swimming, wrestling, basketball, track, crew, baseball, softball, soccer, lacrosse, golf, and tennis. The school mascot is the falcon.

The girls' track team won the New Jersey indoor track Non-Public/Prep state championship in 1928 and 1929.

=== Football rivalry ===
Peddie's rival is Blair Academy, and the two schools compete every year during the second week of November for the Potter-Kelley Cup. The day of the football competition, which alternates yearly between campuses, is known as Blair Day at Peddie (and Peddie Day at Blair). The game between the two schools is the oldest football rivalry in New Jersey and ranks among the oldest in the country.

=== Crew ===
Peddie's crew team was first recognized on the national stage in 1993, when the men's midweight 4+ won a Youth National Championship title in Occaquan, VA. This feat was nearly repeated three years later, with Peddie coming in second in the same event by less than half a second. In 2006, the Peddie Girls' Varsity Four won the United States Youth National Championship, a regatta hosting the strongest club and scholastic teams in the nation. They won again in 2007, defending their U.S. Youth National Regatta title. In 2008, Peddie's Girls' Varsity Four placed third in their division at the Head of the Charles Regatta and returned to the Youth National in Ohio, placing second. The men's varsity four also traveled to Ohio, placing twelve in the Varsity Lightweight Four event. In 2009 the girls and boys returned to the National Championships. The girls regained their first place position, and the men placed sixth in the Petite Final of the Heavyweight Varsity Four. The women then continued on to the Henley Women's Regatta in England, setting a course record on their way to the final and eventually placing second.

=== Swimming ===
Peddie's swimming program has and continues to be nationally ranked. The boys swimming team won the New Jersey Non-Public state championship in 1951. Peddie School swimmers (students or alumni) have represented their nations in every Olympics since 1992. The team has won the Swimming World Mythical National Championships eight times, including the inaugural boys' and girls' independent-school titles in 1977 and 1982. The teams of the early 1990s won back-to-back boys' and girls' Mythical titles in 1990 and 1991. The 1994-95 team was the only team ever to lead the nation in all six relays. In 2007 both the girls' and boys' teams claimed first place at the Eastern Interscholastic Swimming and Diving Championships held at La Salle University in Philadelphia, Pennsylvania. During the 2007 championships, Peddie broke three national independent-school records in the girls' relay events. In 2011, 2012, 2013, 2015, 2016 and 2017 the Peddie's boys swim team won the Eastern Interscholastic Swimming and Diving Championships, continuing their success.

=== Basketball ===
In 2010, the girls' basketball team won the ESPN National High School Invitational, defeating Oak Hill Academy by a score of 60-44 in the tournament final and finishing the season with a 25-2 record.

== Notable alumni ==
- Walter Annenberg (1908-2002; class of 1927), former U.S. Ambassador to the United Kingdom and founder of TV Guide and Seventeen magazines
- Roberto Arias (1918–1989), former Panamanian Ambassador to the United Kingdom
- B. J. Bedford (born 1972), Olympic gold-medalist swimmer at the 2000 Summer Olympics in Sydney, Australia
- Paul Benacerraf (1931–2025), former philosophy of mathematics professor at Princeton University
- Heath Benedict (1983–2008), Dutch American football player
- Breland (born 1995, class of 2013), country singer and songwriter
- Matt Brown (born 1989), former professional football player
- George Case (1915–1989), former professional baseball player, Cleveland Indians and Washington Senators
- Finn M. W. Caspersen (1941-2009, class of 1959), financier, philanthropist, and CEO of Beneficial Corporation and Knickerbocker Management
- Leslie Caveny (class of 1980), film / television writer and producer known for her work on Everybody Loves Raymond
- Chingo Bling (born 1979), Mexican-American rapper and record executive
- Duane 'Dewey' Clarridge (1932–2016), CIA operative and author of the memoir A Spy for All Seasons
- Pia Clemente (class of 1989), received Academy Award nomination for Best Live Action Short Film for her film, Our Time is Up
- Oliver Crane (born 1998), rower who set the record as the youngest person to row solo across the Atlantic Ocean when he completed the 3,000-nautical-mile (5,600 km; 3,500 mi) journey in 2018
- Ronald S. Dancer (born 1949), politician who has served in the New Jersey General Assembly since 2002
- SirVocea Dennis (born 2000), linebacker for the Tampa Bay Buccaneers
- Nelson Diebel (born 1970), double Olympic gold-medalist swimmer at the 1992 Summer Olympics in Barcelona, Spain
- Jahan Dotson (born 2000), professional football wide receiver for the Philadelphia Eagles
- Colin Ferrell (born 1984), defensive tackle for the Indianapolis Colts, who played collegiate football at Kent State University
- Elmer H. Geran (1875–1964; class of 1895), U.S. Congressman from New Jersey's 3rd congressional district from 1925 to 1927
- Lexie Gerson, basketball player
- Max Greyserman (born 1995), professional golfer on the PGA Tour who won three state golf titles as a student at Peddie
- Erik Hanson (born 1965; class of 1983), former professional baseball player
- Richard Hooker (1924–1997), author of M*A*S*H, which spawned the film subsequent television series of the same name
- Tim Hurson (born 1946; class of 1963), speaker, writer, creativity theorist, author of Think Better: An Innovator's Guide to Productive Thinking
- Larry Kelley (1915–2000), winner of the 1936 Heisman Trophy
- Howard W. Koch (1916–2001), film producer and director whose movies include Airplane! and The Odd Couple
- George F. Kugler Jr. (1925-2004), lawyer who served as New Jersey Attorney General from 1970 to 1974
- Robert B. Kugler (born 1950; class of 1968), senior United States district judge of the United States District Court for the District of New Jersey who also serves as a judge on the Foreign Intelligence Surveillance Court
- E. Grey Lewis (1940–2005), lawyer who served as General Counsel of the Navy
- Mike Maccagnan (class of 1985), General Manager of the New York Jets
- W. Steelman Mathis (1898–1981), politician who served in the New Jersey Senate from 1941 to 1942 and 1947 to 1966
- John J. McCloy (1895–1989), Assistant Secretary of War during World War II, president of the World Bank and U.S. High Commissioner for Germany
- Pat Miller, head coach of the Wake Forest Demon Deacons football team from 1929 to 1932
- Megan Miranda (born 1981, class of 1999), novelist
- Eric Munoz (1947–2009), physician and politician, who served in the New Jersey General Assembly from 2001 until his death
- B. Russell Murphy (1889–1957, class of 1909), athlete, coach, and athletics administrator during the early 20th century, who was the first basketball coach at Johns Hopkins University
- George Murphy (1902–1992), Academy Award-winning actor, president of the Screen Actors Guild and U.S. Senator for California, 1964–1971
- Seyyed Hossein Nasr (born 1933; class of 1950), Iranian philosopher
- David Paddock (1892–1962), All-American college football player for the Georgia Bulldogs
- Coral Peña (born 1992/93, class of 2011), actress
- Fernando Perez (born 1983), coach for the San Francisco Giants and former Major League Baseball player for the Tampa Bay Rays, who is a published poet in Poetry magazine
- Haley Peters (born 1992, class of 2010), professional women's basketball forward with the Atlanta Dream of the Women's National Basketball Association
- John Plant (1877–1954), basketball player who served as head coach for the Bucknell Bison men's basketball team from 1926 to 1932
- Jules Prown (born 1930), art historian
- Myron Rolle (born 1986), Rhodes Scholar who played safety in the NFL for the Tennessee Titans
- Jacqueline Reses (born 1969/70), businesswoman, investor, author and philanthropist
- Richard Sachs (born 1953; class of 1971), custom bicycle frame maker
- Nat Sakdatorn (born 1983), winner of Thailand's reality-television singing contest Academy Fantasia (Season 4) and now a singer-songwriter in the Thai music industry under the label "True Fantasia"
- Billy Schuler (born 1990), soccer player for the Carolina RailHawks in the North American Soccer League
- Alan Shapley (1903–1973), Lieutenant General in the United States Marine Corps and a recipient of the Navy Cross
- Heather J. Sharkey (born 1967, class of 1985), historian of the Middle East and Africa at the University of Pennsylvania
- Lloyd Spencer (1893–1981), politician who served as United States Senator from the state of Arkansas from 1941 to 1943
- Jonathan Sprout (born 1952), songwriter, performer and recording artist
- Chester I. Steele (1913–1967), Rear Admiral who served in the United States Coast Guard
- Stanley Steingut (1920–1989), New York Assemblyman (1953–1978), Minority Leader of the Assembly (1969–1974), Speaker of the New York Assembly (1975–1978), and Chairman of the Brooklyn Democratic Committee (1962–1969)
- Chris Tomson (born 1984), drummer of indie rock band, Vampire Weekend
- Larry Townsend (1930–2008), author of dozens of books including The Leatherman's Handbook (1972)
- Richard Tregaskis (1916–1973), war correspondent and author of Guadalcanal Diary, the source for the 1943 film of the same name starring William Bendix, Richard Conte and Anthony Quinn
- Lew Tucker (born 1950), computer scientist, open source advocate and industry executive
- Hakeem Valles (born 1992; class of 2011), American football player who played in the NFL for the Arizona Cardinals
- E. Norman Veasey (born 1933), Chief Justice of the Delaware Supreme Court
- Albert L. Vreeland (1901–1975; class of 1922), U.S. Representative from New Jersey
- Davis Warren (born 2002; class of 2021), college football quarterback for the Michigan Wolverines
- Glen Everett Woolfenden (1930–2007), ornithologist, known for his long-term study of the Florida scrub jay population at Archbold Biological Station near Lake Placid, Florida

== Notable faculty ==
- Jennifer Dore (born 1971), rower who is a two-time Olympian and World Champion
- Barbara Kirch (born 1960), Olympic rower who competed in both the 1984 and 1988 Olympic coxless pair contests
- Paul Watkins (born 1964), author
- Lew Watts (1922–2003), professional baseball player, coach and author
