= Tess Hurson =

Irish poet and academic

- Born: 1955 (age 70–71); Annaghbeg, County Tyrone, Northern Ireland
- Occupation: Writer

Tess Hurson (born 1955) is a poet and academic from Northern Ireland.

== Life ==
Hurson was born in 1955 in Annaghbeg, County Tyrone where she still lives. She gained her education in St Patrick's Academy, Dungannon and then went to college to study English at Trinity College, Dublin. She did an MA in Anglo-Irish Literature at Queen's University Belfast and then finished up with a PhD at York University, Toronto where her thesis topic was the work of Flann O'Brien which has made her one of the foremost experts on his work. She wrote extensively in college for the college newspapers. Later she was encouraged to take up writing again, especially poetry and eventually published her first collection with Lagan Press, in 1997.

She took a position at Queen's University Belfast where she is currently Director of Undergraduate programmes and she did work in the University of Ulster at Coleraine. She has served on the Arts Council.

In 2000 she married the photographer, Ian Maginess.

== Bibliography ==
- Tess Hurson (1997). Vivarium. Lagan Press. ISBN 978-1-873687-36-9.
- Anne Clune; Tess Hurson (1997). Conjuring complexities: essays on Flann O'Brien. Institute of Irish Studies, The Queen's University of Belfast. ISBN 9780853896753.
- William Carleton (1992). Tess Hurson (ed.). Inside the margins: a Carleton reader. Lagan Press. ISBN 9781873687024.
- Tess Hurson (1990). Beautiful Craft, Yet without Fuss.
- Tess Hurson (1992). "Lost tribes and Spanish gold". Fortnight, (306): 18–20.
