= Good+Foundation =

Nonprofit organization in New York, United States

- Website: www.goodplusfoundation.org

Good+Foundation (originally called Baby Buggy) was founded in May 2001 by Jessica Seinfeld after the birth of her first child. According to Seinfeld, "shortly after the birth of my daughter, Sascha, having slowly accumulated closets full of used – but very usable – baby clothing and equipment she no longer needed, I had a moral dilemma; as the daughter of a social worker, throwing out perfectly good baby gear was unthinkable; and yet there was no easy way to get it to a family who could use it. Thus, Baby Buggy was born."

In April 2016, Baby Buggy renamed to GOOD+ Foundation (and eventually rebranded to Good+Foundation in June 2019) to better communicate its model: pairing donations of essential children's and family items with transformational programs. The combination of its goods and partner services is the idea behind the migration to Good+.

Good+Foundation grants donations of products and services to programs that have demonstrated a capacity to address family poverty in three focus areas: supporting new mothers, investing in early childhood and engaging fathers. Through the generous support of donors and volunteers, GOOD+ Foundation has donated over $50M worth of items through its partner network across the United States.

More than $6 million of Good+Foundation's annual budget is made up of in-kind product donations from individuals and corporations. Financial support for the organization comes through its board of directors, the Friends of GOOD+ NY and LA groups, other private individuals, corporations and foundations. Since 2014, 90 cents of every dollar received by Baby Buggy went straight to programs.
