= Tim Hurson =

- Born: 1946 (age 79–80); Johannesburg, South Africa
- Occupations: Writer, speaker, consultant Founding partner, ThinkX Intellectual Capital
- Website: Tim Hurson ThinkX Intellectual Capital Think Better Blog

Tim Hurson (born 1946) is a speaker, writer and creativity theorist living in Toronto, Ontario, Canada. He was born in Johannesburg, South Africa, and grew up in New York City, USA. He is now a Canadian citizen. He was educated at The Peddie School in Hightstown, New Jersey, and went to college at Oberlin College in Ohio.

Hurson was a founding partner of Manifest Communications, a company focussed on social change strategy. He was its president until selling the company in 1996. After working independently for several years, he became a founding partner of ThinkX Intellectual Capital.

Hurson developed a problem-solving technique known as the ThinkX Productive Thinking Model, a six-step process that builds on the Osborn-Parnes Creative Problem Solving (CPS) Process, combining it with more rigorous engineering-based techniques such as IDEF. His book Think Better was translated into Chinese, Portuguese, Korean, Spanish, Thai, and Polish. The English edition was re-issued with an updated preface in 2018.

Hurson is a faculty member of the conference of the Creativity European Association (CREA). and co-founder regular presenter at Mindcamp Canada creativity retreat. He is a founding board member of Oberlin College's LaunchU Entrepreneurship bootcamp.
