= John Plant (coach) =

American sports coach and administrator (1877–1954)

Biographical details
- Born: November 19, 1877; Stoke-on-Trent, England
- Died: February 19, 1954 (aged 76); Hightstown, New Jersey, U.S.

Coaching career (HC unless noted)

Basketball
- 1926–1932: Bucknell

Track and field
- 1926–1947: Bucknell

Boxing
- 1928–1930: Bucknell

Administrative career (AD unless noted)
- 1926–1947: Bucknell

Head coaching record
- Overall: 54–49 (basketball)

John Danza Plant (November 19, 1877 – February 19, 1954) was an athletic coach at Bucknell University from 1926 to 1947. He was the head basketball coach there from 1926 to 1932, compiling a record of 54–49.

Plant was originally from Stoke-on-Trent, Staffordshire, England. As a child, he served as a laborer in the pottery mills of Trenton, New Jersey. He often recalled that he and his brother were given cigarettes to smoke in order to keep his lungs clear of dust. In his teens and twenties, he played basketball and football in early professional and amateur leagues. He attended the Peddie School, a prep school then affiliated with the Northern Baptist Convention, located in Hightstown, New Jersey starting in the early years of the 20th century and at some point began coaching there. His basketball teams won six New Jersey Prep School Championships and he was a successful football coach. Among his players were John J. McCloy, Peddie Class of 1912, who served as Assistant Secretary of War during World War II and as United States High Commissioner for Germany and George Murphy, Class of 1920, later a Hollywood actor and Senator from California. McCloy credited Plant with the phrase "run with the swift" and with an approach to life that those words embodied and which McCloy made his own. (Evan Thomas The Wise Men) Too old to volunteer for the First World War, Plant joined the YMCA and ran athletic competitions for American Doughboys stationed in France.

Plant came to Bucknell University in 1926, coaching basketball (1926–1932), track and field (1926–1947), and boxing (co-coach, 1928–1930). He also was the director of physical education, and was involved in the creation of the school's intramural program. The intramural program stressed "participation for all" and was emulated by other schools.

Plant retired in 1947 and was given the honor of "The Grand Old Man of Bucknell Athletics". He was entered into the Bucknell Athletics Hall of Fame in 1982.
