= Heath Benedict =

American football player

No. 74
- Position: Offensive tackle

Personal information
- Born: June 30, 1983; Tilburg, Netherlands
- Died: March 23, 2008 (aged 24); Ponte Vedra Beach, Florida, U.S.
- Listed height: 6 ft 6 in (1.98 m)
- Listed weight: 320 lb (145 kg)

Career information
- High school: Peddie School (Hightstown, New Jersey)
- College: Newberry Wolves (2004–2007)

Awards and highlights
- 2× Jacobs Blocking Trophy (2006–2007); 1st-team All-American by AP and D2football.com (2007); Gene Upshaw Award finalist (2007); 3× 1st-team All-SAC (2005–2007)

Heath Benedict (June 30, 1983 – March 23, 2008) was a Dutch American football player. An offensive tackle, Benedict was considered to be one of the top offensive linemen prospects for the 2008 NFL draft. However, he died before the draft took place.

== Early life and education ==
Benedict was born in Tilburg, The Netherlands, to United States citizens: Ed Benedict, a former high school star athlete from Youngsville, Pennsylvania, and Holly Devore. After his birth, the family moved to Greer, South Carolina, where Benedict grew up playing baseball, basketball, and soccer. Benedict was originally a talented baseball prospect who threw fastballs in the low 90s by the time he reached high school. After his freshman year Benedict had surgery on his pitching elbow to have bone spurs removed. Instead of letting this setback deter him, Benedict began playing football, a sport he found he naturally excelled at.

After his sophomore year, Benedict transferred from Riverside High School in Greer to the Peddie School in New Jersey to focus on football. It was there that Benedict mastered his craft. Upon completion of his senior season in 2003, he was considered the top football prospect in the state of New Jersey. Benedict was the Number 7 Parade All-American in that year as well. He had scholarship offers from all major Division 1 programs. Benedict chose to visit Tennessee, South Carolina, Miami, Florida State, and Oklahoma (which was canceled after his decision to attend the University of Tennessee).

== College career ==
He originally signed to play for the University of Tennessee, but transferred to Newberry College, where he played right tackle. Benedict left school with one semester of classes remaining to pursue an NFL career, and participated in the Senior Bowl (being the only Division II player since 2004 to do so) as well as the NFL Scouting Combine.

== Death ==
Benedict died suddenly at his home in Jacksonville, Florida, on March 23, 2008, due to an enlarged heart.

== See also ==
- List of gridiron football players who died during their careers
