= Blair Academy =

Private school in Blairstown, New Jersey, US

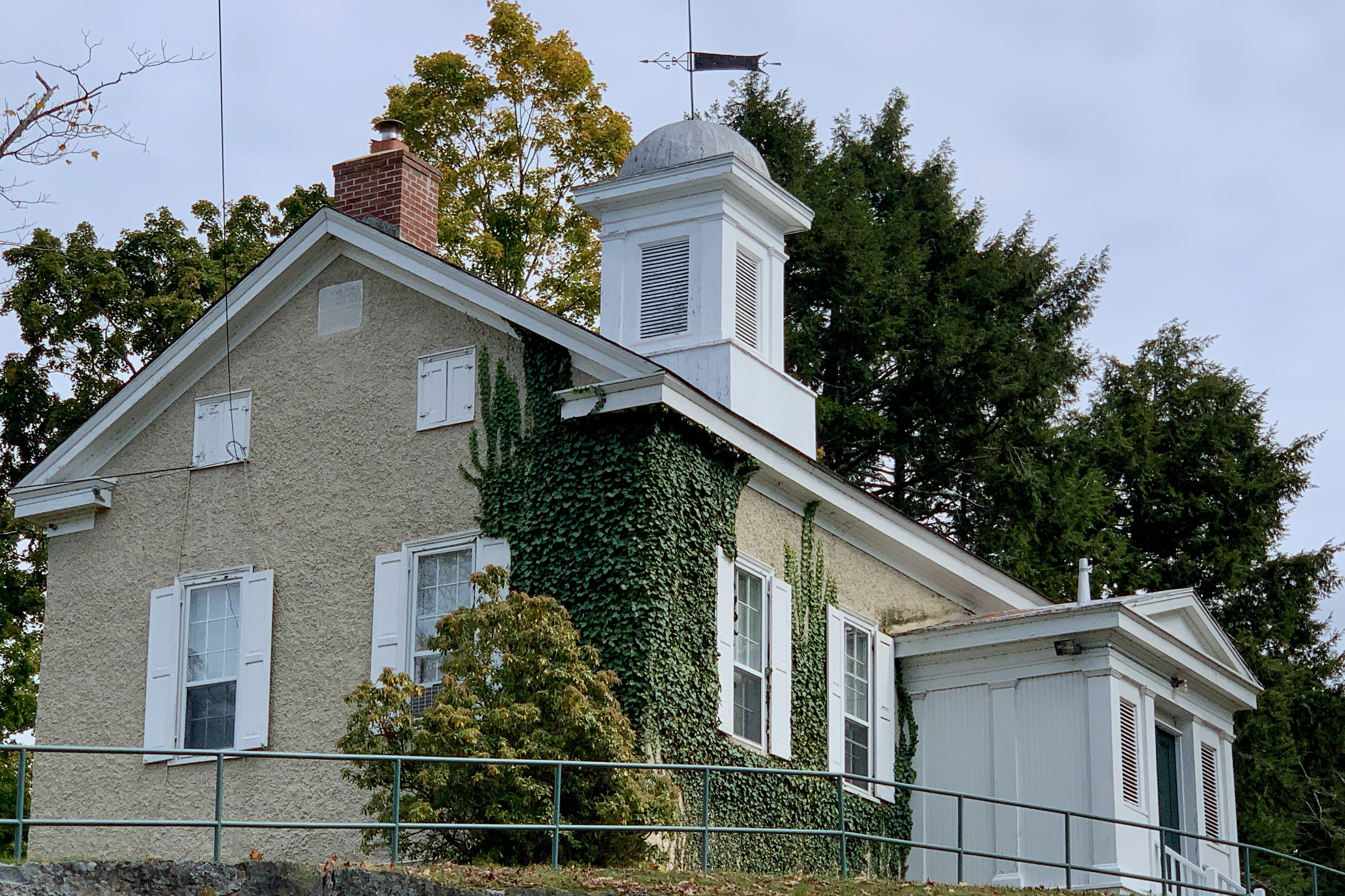
- Old Academy Building

Location
- 2 Park Street; Blairstown, Warren County, New Jersey 07825; United States; 40°59′06″N 74°57′50″W

Information
- Type: Private, Boarding, Day
- Motto: Venite, Studete, Discite ("Come, Study, Learn")
- Established: 1848; 178 years ago
- NCES School ID: 00869091
- Head of school: Peter G. Curran (2021–present)
- Faculty: 65 FTEs
- Enrollment: 474 (as of 2023–24)
- Student to teacher ratio: 7.3:1
- Campus: Rural, 463 acres (1.87 km^{2})
- Colors: Navy blue; White; Gray
- Athletics conference: Mid-Atlantic Prep League
- Team name: Buccaneers
- Rival: Peddie School
- Accreditation: Middle States Association of Colleges and Schools Commission on Elementary and Secondary Schools
- Endowment: $145 million
- Tuition: $78,980 boarding; $55,050 day (2025–26)
- Website: www.blair.edu
- Blair Presbyterial Academy
- U.S. National Register of Historic Places
- U.S. Historic district
- New Jersey Register of Historic Places
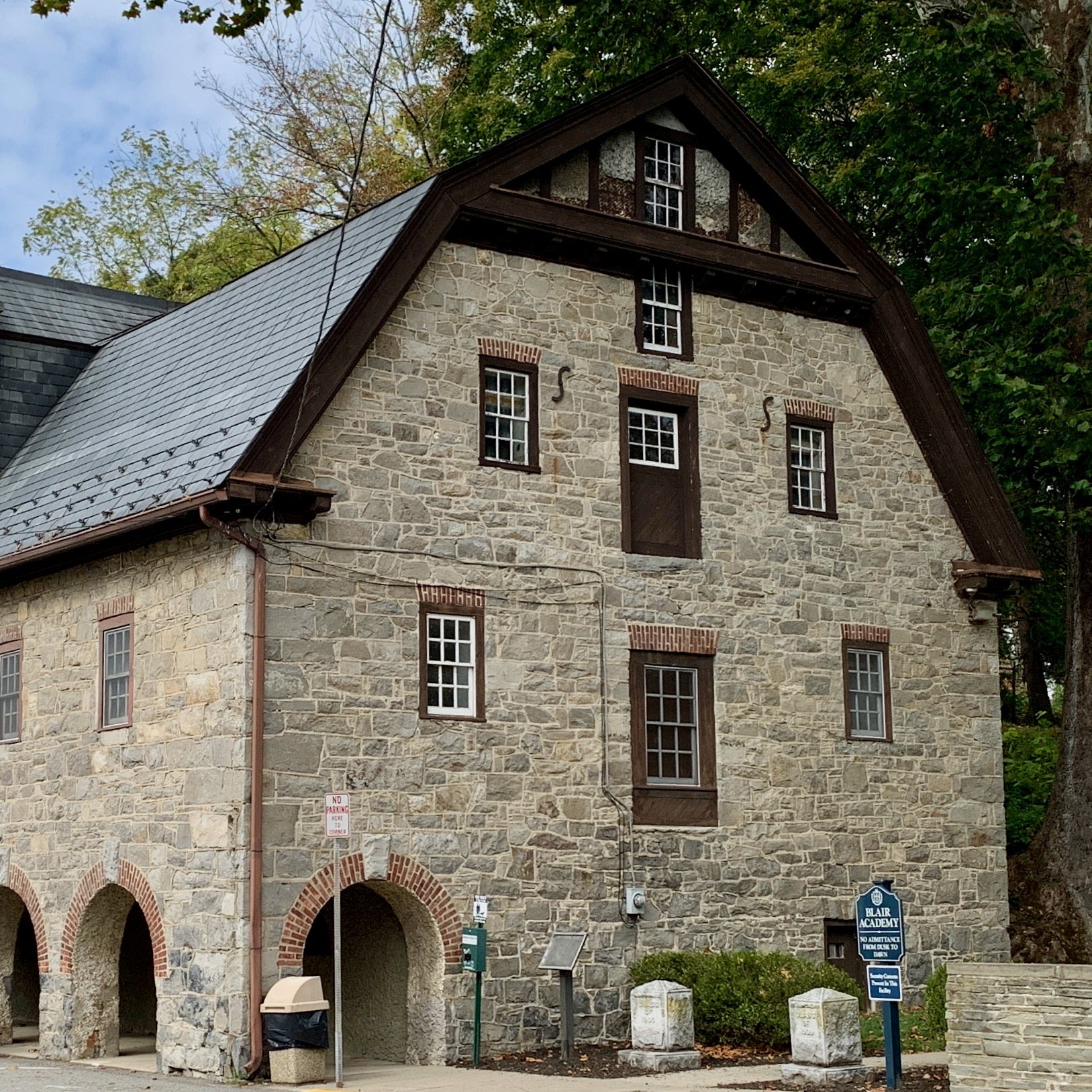
- The Mill, built 1825, also part of the Blairstown Historic District
- Area: 55 acres (22 ha)
- Architect: Addison Hutton
- Architectural style: Colonial Revival, Queen Anne, Richardsonian Romanesque
- NRHP reference No.: 89001944
- NJRHP No.: 2748

Significant dates
- Added to NRHP: January 24, 1992
- Designated NJRHP: December 2, 1991

Blair Academy is a coeducational, boarding and day school for students in high school in Blairstown, New Jersey, United States. The school serves students from ninth through twelfth grades as well as a small post-graduate class. The school's campus is located on a 463 acres (1.87 km^{2}) campus in Blairstown in Warren County, in the U.S. state of New Jersey, approximately 60 miles (97 km) west of New York City.

As of the 2023–24 school year, the school had an enrollment of 474 students and 65 classroom teachers (on an FTE basis), for a student–teacher ratio of 7.3:1. The school's student body was 53.4% (253) White, 27.4% (130) Asian, 8.9% (42) Black, 6.3% (30) Hispanic and 4.0% (19).

== Academics ==
Blair's academic program follows the traditional four-year college-preparatory plan. Diploma requirements are governed by college entrance requirements. In 2024, the school moved away from Advanced Placement (AP) courses, in favor of a new curriculum designed by the faculty to allow "students to demonstrate their ability to handle advanced coursework in a greater variety of disciplines."

In 2026, Blair offers 160 courses, with 68 honors and advanced classes available to students.

== Athletics ==
Blair primarily competes in the Mid-Atlantic Prep League (which includes Blair Academy, Peddie School, Lawrenceville School, The Hill School, Hun School of Princeton and Mercersburg Academy). The school's traditional mascot is the "Buccaneer" (with the team called the Bucs) and the school colors are navy blue, white and grey. Blair's traditional arch-rival is The Peddie School of Hightstown, New Jersey. Since 1903, Blair and Peddie have competed in football, and the rivalry constitutes New Jersey's oldest continuous prep football competition. Each November, the two schools compete against one another in a fall sports competition, with the winner receiving the Kelley-Potter Cup.

During the days leading up to Peddie Day, spirit abounds at Blair. The campus is bedecked with banners hanging from windows, often poking fun at Peddie's Falcon mascot (known to Blair as the Peddie Chickens). On Peddie Day held at Blair in November 2021, Blair claimed the Kelley-Potter Cup for the ninth time.

=== Football ===
Former Blair football player Dion Lewis was drafted in the 5th round of the 2011 NFL draft by the Philadelphia Eagles. He has received numerous honors in 2010 such as, Sporting News Top 5 Heisman Trophy Candidate, Top 25 Overall Players (No. 6), All America Team (first team), All-Big East, as well as ESPN.com "Big East's 25 Best" No.1.

=== Swimming ===
The boys swimming team won the NJSIAA state Non-Public state championship in 1926, 1932 and 1935–1940.

=== Wrestling ===
The most successful athletic program at Blair Academy is the wrestling team. From 1981 to 2013, Blair Academy won 33 consecutive National Prep Championships. Jeff Buxton served as an assistant and then head coach of Blair Academy from 1982 to 2012, helping lead the team to 30 consecutive National Prep Championships during his tenure as a coach. The school has produced a number of collegiate wrestling national champions and All-Americans, along with Olympic gold medalist Bobby Weaver. Considered one of the most successful high school programs in the nation, they have won in total over 40 National Prep Team Championships.

Basketball

Former Blair Blair basketball players Luol Deng, Charlie Villanueva, Royal Ivey, Marial Shayok, Temi Fagbenle and Olivia Miles have played in the NBA and WNBA. In September 2026, Olivia Miles unanimously received the WNBA Rookie of the Year award.

== Facilities ==
Almost all campus architecture is in the Richardson Romanesque style, and modern buildings reflect the features and themes of the older structures. There are six major academic buildings: Clinton Hall, Bogle Science Center, Timken Library, Armstrong-Hipkins Center for the Arts, Weber Hall, and the Chiang-Elghanayan Center for Innovation and Collaboration.

Bogle Science Center, dedicated in 1989 and expanded and renovated in 2019, provides laboratories and classrooms for the science department and includes the 100-seat Cowan Auditorium. Armstrong-Hipkins Center for the Arts was dedicated in 1997 and includes the 500-seat DuBois Theatre, the black box Wean Theatre, and practice rooms. The renovated Timken Library opened in 1998. Annie Hall, a girls' dormitory, opened in the fall of 1999. The Romano Dining Hall was completed in the fall of 2000, and renovation of Insley Hall was completed in 2001. A major expansion and renovation of the school's athletic and activities facilities and fields occurred between 2006 and 2009: a lighted, synthetic turf field for football, field hockey, and soccer, with new stands, press box, and 400 meter all-weather track; ten new tennis courts (five lighted), a new junior varsity baseball field, and expansion of the existing, natural grass fields. The renovation and expansion of the existing athletic center, including a new student center, concluded in March 2009. This facility, known as Hardwick Hall, houses seven squash courts, three gymnasiums, wrestling facilities, aerobic space, a fitness center, a training room, and locker rooms, and also includes Blair Commons, home of the School's bookstore, The Black Canteen, and college counseling offices. Blair's athletic facilities also include a nine-hole golf course.

The School's pedestrian campus was completed in 2010, making the center of campus vehicle-free. In 2015, the School opened Kathryn Hall, an upper-school girls' dormitory, and Lakeside Hall, an upper-school boys' dormitory, each of which includes three faculty apartments. The Chiang-Elghanayan Center for Innovation and Collaboration, a modern, technology-rich academic facility was completed in 2017 and serves as home to Blair's technology and fine arts departments. Also in 2017, Weber Hall was renovated to best facilitate the teaching of math. In 2018, Blair added the J. Li Golf Training Center and seasonal winter sports complex to its athletic facilities. In 2021 a crew training center was opened and the "Shipyard" outdoor basketball court was named. The all-weather track was resurfaced in 2024.

In 2025, the School opened the Center for Health & Well-Being, attached to Hardwick Hall's athletics facilities. This marks the first time Blair's counseling and health services have been brought together in a space that includes a classroom, yoga studio and student union.

In 2026, Blair Academy opened a new Center for Health and Well-Being, a transformed athletic field, updated dormitories, inviting outdoor gathering spaces and additional student housing. Together, the projects represent a $35 million investment.

== Statistics ==
=== Enrollment ===
Characteristics of the student body:

- Total enrollment: 484 (85% boarding / 15% day)
- Male/female ratio: 53% / 47%
- Number of postgraduate students: 8
- Number of countries represented: 27 (17% of student body)
- Number of states represented: 27

=== Tuition and fees ===
For the 2026–27 academic year, Blair charges $81,950 for tuition, room and board. Day students are charged $57,000, which covers tuition, study rooms, and meals at school.

Scholarship grants total $9.9 million for the 2026–27 academic year, with 36 percent of students receiving financial aid. The average day student award is $38,049 and the average boarding student award is $58,361.

=== Faculty ===
- Student/Faculty Ratio: 5:1
- Head of School: Peter G. Curran

=== Accreditation ===
- Middle States Association of Colleges and Schools Commission on Elementary and Secondary Schools (since 1928). The school's accreditation status was extended for seven years in Fall 2018.

=== School memberships ===
It is a member of Mid-Atlantic Boarding School Group (MABS).

- ADVIS – Association of Delaware Valley Independent Schools
- CASE – Council for Advancement and Support of Education
- NAIS – National Association of Independent Schools
- NJAIS – New Jersey Association of Independent Schools

=== Endowment ===
- Market value (approximate): $190 million as of the 2026–27 school year, the 26th-largest of any U.S. private school.

=== Campus ===
- The campus, set among 463 acres (1.87 km^{2}) of rolling hills in the shadow of the Delaware Water Gap, is home to numerous grand old buildings and in 1992 was entered into the National Register of Historic Places in recognition of its historic and architectural significance.
- In the 1960s and 1970s, the campus was used in the summer by Camp Racquet, a tennis camp run by Charlie Lundgren, then the coach of the tennis team at Upsala College.

== Notable alumni ==
- Jabri Abdur-Rahim (born 2002, class of 2020), basketball player for the Providence Friars
- Onome Akinbode-James (born 2000), Nigerian basketball player who played college basketball for the Duke Blue Devils women's basketball team and has represented Nigeria internationally
- Mahlon Apgar IV (1941–2023, class of 1958), businessman and former Assistant Secretary of the Army
- John C. Bogle (1929–2019), founder of The Vanguard Group
- John W. Campbell (1910–1971), science fiction writer and editor of Astounding Science Fiction
- John Cassavetes (1929–1989), actor, screenwriter, and director
- Camille Clarin (born 2001, class of 2019), basketball player who played for the NU Lady Bulldogs and the Philippines women's national basketball team
- Burleigh Cruikshank (1890–1982), American football player and Presbyterian minister
- Anthony D'Amato (born 1987), singer and songwriter
- Ray Davis (born 1999), NFL running back for the Buffalo Bills
- Branson DeCou (1892–1941), photographer and traveler
- Luol Deng (born 1985, class of 2003), former professional basketball player for the Chicago Bulls, Cleveland Cavaliers, Miami Heat, Los Angeles Lakers, and Minnesota Timberwolves
- Jordan Dingle (born 2000, class of 2019), college basketball player for KK Vojvodina of the Basketball League of Serbia
- Tim Eustace (born 1956, class of 1974), member of the New Jersey General Assembly from the 38th Legislative District from 2012 to 2018
- Temi Fagbenle (born 1992, class of 2011), professional WNBA player for the Golden State Valkyries
- A.J. Ferrari (born 2001, class of 2020), NCAA champion wrestler, bronze medalist at U17 World Championships in freestyle wrestling
- Reid Fliehr (1988–2013), professional wrestler
- Akoldah Gak (born 2002), professional basketball player for the Mexico City Capitanes of the NBA G League
- Thomas F. Goldsmith (1938–2020, class of 1957), mayor of Easton, Pennsylvania from 1993 to 2003
- Bob Guccione (1930–2010), publisher of Penthouse magazine
- John R. Guthrie (1921–2009, class of 1938), United States Army four-star general
- James Hagerty (1909–1981), White House Press Secretary during the presidency of Dwight D. Eisenhower
- Nathan Healy (born 1990), former professional basketball player
- Max Heidegger (born 1997), American-Israeli basketball player for Maccabi Tel Aviv of the Israeli Basketball Premier League
- Andrew R. Heinze (born 1955, class of 1973), writer and scholar of American history
- Royal Ivey (born 1981), former professional basketball player who has been an assistant coach with the Houston Rockets
- George P. Jenkins Jr. (1915–2009), chairman of Metropolitan Life
- Sanoussi Kane (born 2001, class of 2020), NFL safety for the Tennessee Titans
- Jesse L. Lasky Jr. (1910–1988), screenwriter, novelist, playwright and poet
- Dion Lewis (born 1990, class of 2009), running back for the University of Pittsburgh and the Tennessee Titans
- Stuart Loory (1932–2015, class of 1950, author who was managing editor of the Chicago Sun-Times and executive vice president of Turner Networks
- Mason Manville (born 1997), freestyle, folkstyle and Greco-Roman wrestler
- Tucker Max (born 1975), Internet celebrity and New York Times best-selling author
- Joseph McKenna (born 1995), freestyle and folkstyle wrestler, three-time NCAA All-American
- Olivia Miles (born 2003, class of 2021), WNBA basketball player for Minnesota Lynx
- Steve Mocco (born 1981), Olympic freestyle wrestler at 2008 Summer Olympics, two-time NCAA champion, professional mixed martial artist
- Will Neff (born 1989, class of 2008), Twitch streamer, YouTuber, and actor
- David Ojabo (born 2000, class of 2019), NFL outside linebacker for the Miami Dolphins
- Odafe Oweh (born 1998, class of 2018), NFL outside linebacker for the Washington Commanders
- Otega Oweh (born 2003, class of 2022), basketball player
- Frank Perantoni (1923–1991), American football center, played professional football for the New York Yankees of the AAFC
- Tucker Richardson, basketball player for Brussels Basketball of the BNXT League
- Deron Rippey Jr. (born 2007), college basketball player for the Duke Blue Devils
- Justin Robinson (born 1987), professional basketball player for the London Lions of the British Basketball League
- Ed Ruth (born 1990), former freestyle and folkstyle wrestler, three-time NCAA champion, professional mixed martial artist
- Albert G. Rutherford (1879–1941), U.S. Congressman
- Ed Sabol (1916–2015), founder of NFL Films
- John Sebastian (born 1944, class of 1962), lead singer and guitarist for the band the Lovin' Spoonful
- Becky Selengut (born 1970, class of 1988), chef and cookbook author
- Marial Shayok (born 1995, class of 2014), professional basketball player, played in the NBA for the Philadelphia 76ers, plays in the Israeli Basketball Premier League
- Joseph Horace Shull (1848–1944), member of the U.S. House of Representatives from Pennsylvania's 26th congressional district from 1903 to 1905
- William E. Simon (1927–2000), businessman and 63rd Secretary of the Treasury
- Joe Stanowicz (1921–1999), football player who attended the United States Military Academy, where he played guard for the Army Black Knights football team
- Samuel S. Stratton (1916–1990), U.S. Congressman
- Hudson Taylor (born 1987), college wrestling coach at Columbia University, three-time NCAA All-American wrestler, founder of Athlete Ally
- Taki Theodoracopulos (born 1937, class of 1955), conservative writer
- Ned Thomson (born 1953), politician who represented the 30th Legislative District in the New Jersey General Assembly from 2017 to 2024
- Mike Tobey (born 1994, class of 2012), professional basketball player for Valencia Basket of the Liga ACB
- Charlie Villanueva (born 1984, class of 2003), former professional basketball player, played in the NBA for the Dallas Mavericks
- Alexis Wangmene (born 1989), Cameroonian basketball player at the University of Texas at Austin
- Bobby Weaver (born 1958), Olympic freestyle wrestler, won gold medal at 1984 Summer Olympics
