= Hun School of Princeton =

Private school in Princeton, New Jersey, United States

The Hun School of Princeton

Location
- 176 Edgerstoune Road; Princeton, Mercer County, New Jersey 08540; United States; 40.337°N 74.686°W

Information
- Type: Private, Boarding
- Motto: Quaerite Scientiam Et Honorum "Seek Knowledge and Honor"
- Established: 1914
- NCES School ID: A9104467
- Head of school: Bart Bronk
- Faculty: 95 FTEs
- Grades: 6-12
- Enrollment: 669 (as of 2019–20)
- Student to teacher ratio: 7:1
- Campus: 45 acres (180,000 m^{2})
- Colors: Red and Black
- Athletics: 50+ Interscholastic Sports
- Athletics conference: Mid-Atlantic Prep League
- Team name: Raiders
- Annual tuition: $80,300 (resident) $55,600 (day); Upper School for 2025-26
- Website: hunschool.org
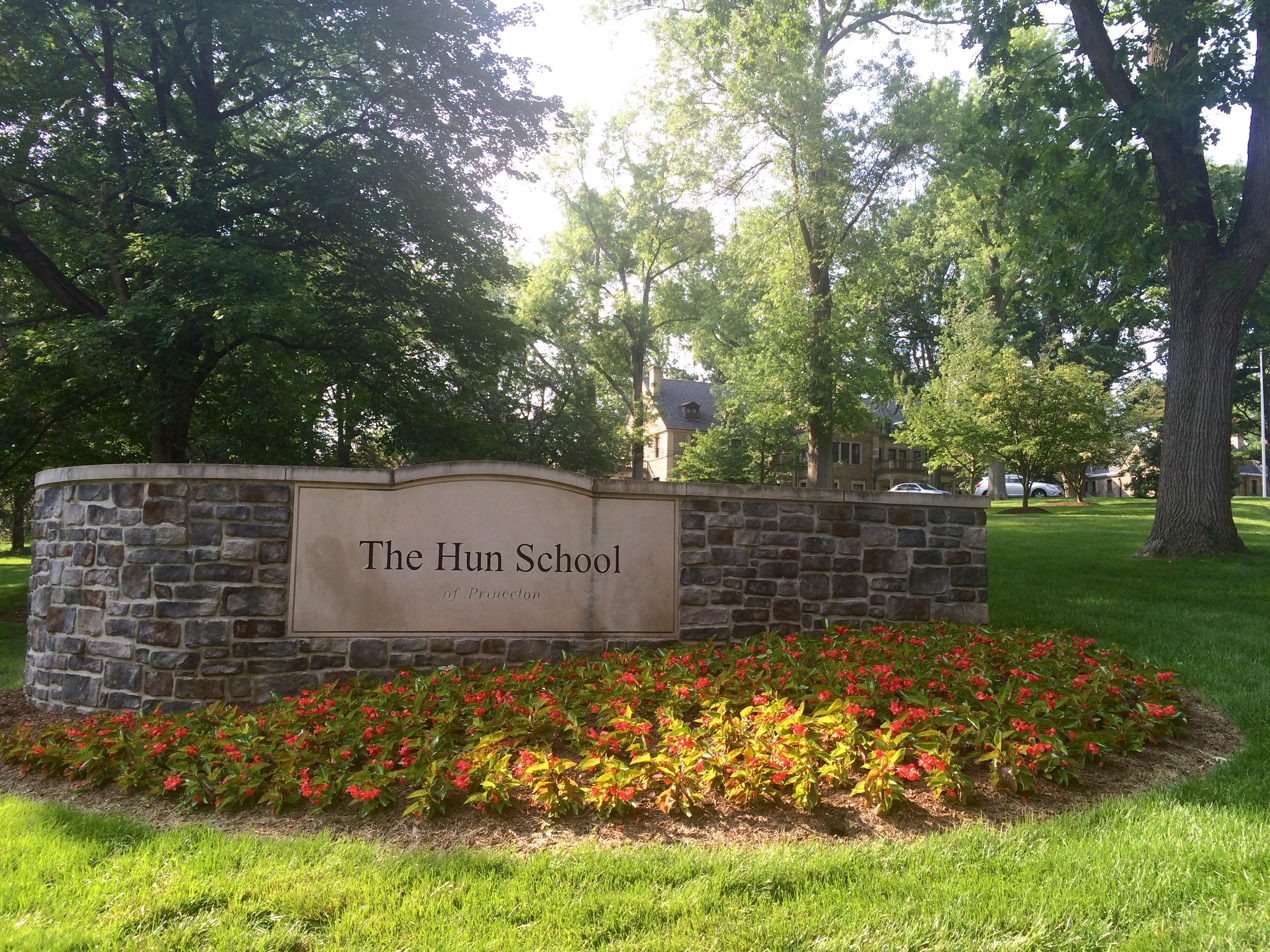

The Hun School of Princeton is a private, coeducational, secondary day and boarding school located in Princeton in Mercer County, in the U.S. state of New Jersey. The school serves students from sixth through twelfth grades. The school has been accredited by the Middle States Association of Colleges and Schools Commission on Elementary and Secondary Schools since 1963 and is accredited until January 2025. It is also a member of the New Jersey Association of Independent Schools. The acceptance rate for the school has been reported as 35%.

Since July 2023, the head of school has been Bart Bronk, the 11th in school history, succeeding Jon Brougham, who had served for 14 years in the position.

== History ==
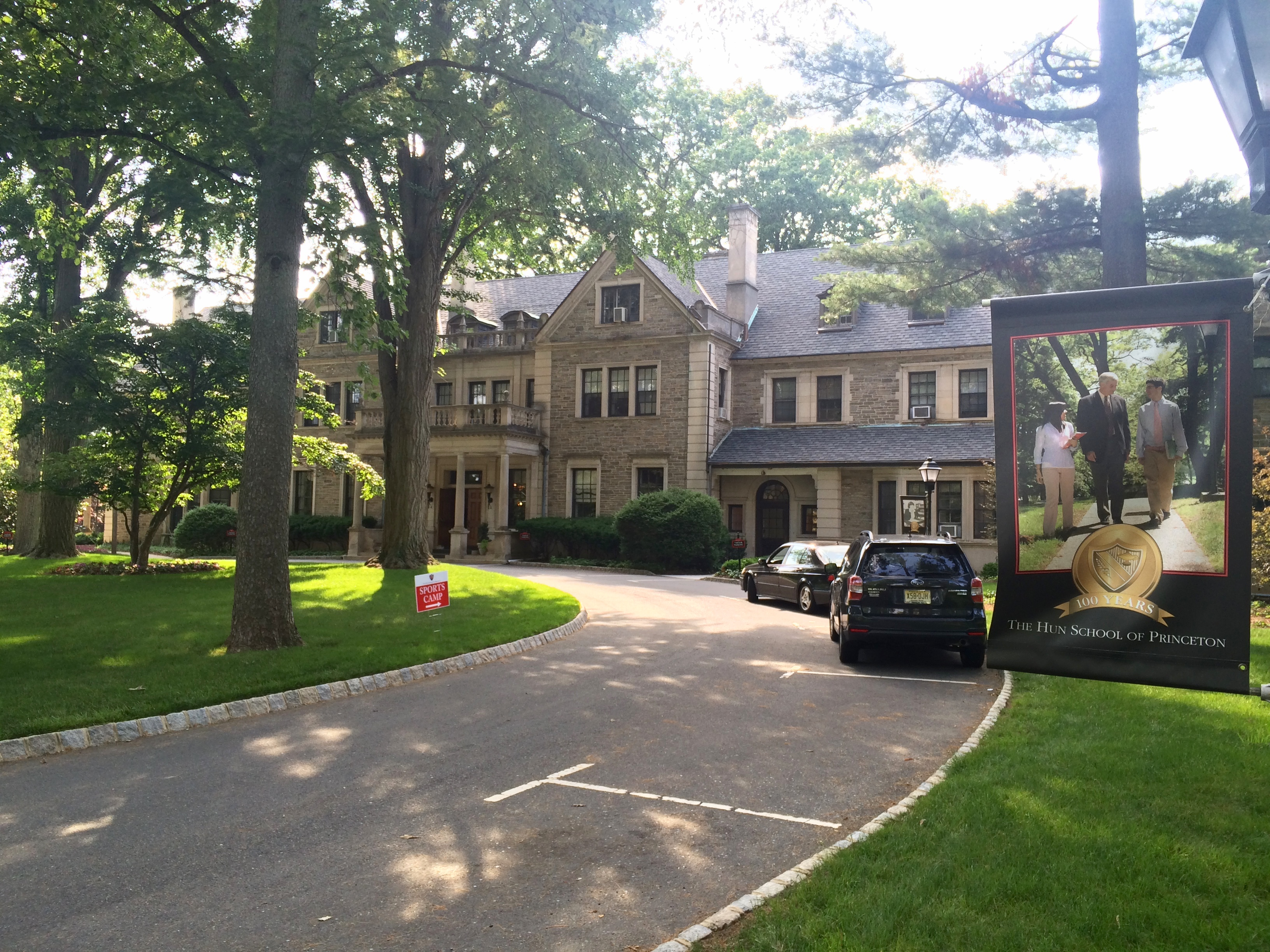
Edgerstoune, the administration building, built 1903 by William Russell

The school was founded in 1914 by Dr. John Gale Hun, a professor at Princeton University. Originally called the Princeton Math School, it later changed its name to the Princeton Tutoring School. In 1925, the school acquired both its current name and the property on Edgerstoune Road that makes up its current location.

== Student body ==
As of the 2019–20 school year, the school had an enrollment of 669 students and 95 classroom teachers (on an FTE basis), for a student–teacher ratio of 7:1. The school's student body was 59.8% (400) White, 23.9% (160) Asian, 6.1% (41) Black, 5.4% (36) two or more races, 4.5% (30) Hispanic and 0.3% (2) American Indian / Alaska Native. 95 students attend the Hun Middle School, which houses grades 6–8. The rest are in the Upper School. 70% of Hun's Upper School students are day students, and the rest are boarders. Students come from 15 states and 27 countries.

== Athletics ==
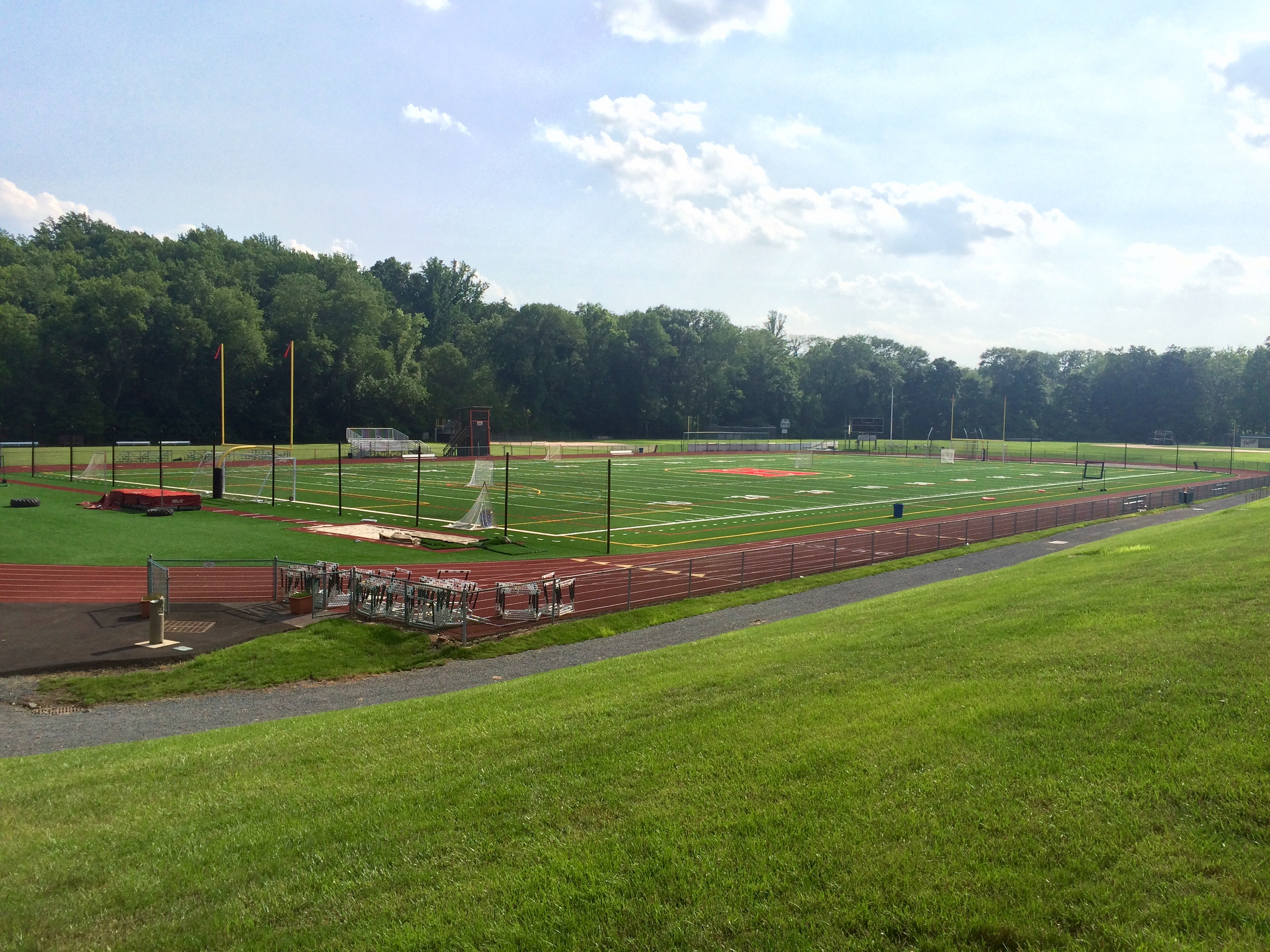
Part of the playing fields along the Stony Brook

The Hun School Raiders participate in the Mid-Atlantic Prep League, a sports league with participating institutions from university preparatory schools in the New Jersey, New York and Pennsylvania area. Schools competing in the league include Blair Academy in Blairstown, New Jersey, The Hill School in Pottstown, Pennsylvania, Lawrenceville School in Lawrenceville, New Jersey, Mercersburg Academy in Mercersburg, Pennsylvania and Peddie School in Hightstown, New Jersey. The Hun School also competes against other local schools.

- Fall sports: coed cross-country running, dance, girls' field hockey, boys' football, boys' and girls' soccer, girls' tennis, girls' volleyball
- Winter sports: boys' and girls' basketball, boys’ and girls' rock climbing, boys' and girls' fencing, boys' and girls' ice hockey, boys' and girls' swimming
- Spring sports: boys' baseball, boys' and girls' crew, dance, golf, boys' and girls' lacrosse, girls' softball, Track, boys' tennis

Sports offered by the Hun Middle School include:

- Fall sports: boys' and girls' cross-country running, boys' and girls' soccer, girls' field hockey
- Winter sports: boys' and girls' basketball
- Spring sports: boys' and girls' tennis, boys' lacrosse, boys' baseball, girls' softball

The 1931 boys' basketball team won the Class A Prep state title with a 24-18 victory against St. Benedict's Preparatory School in the tournament final.

== Facilities ==
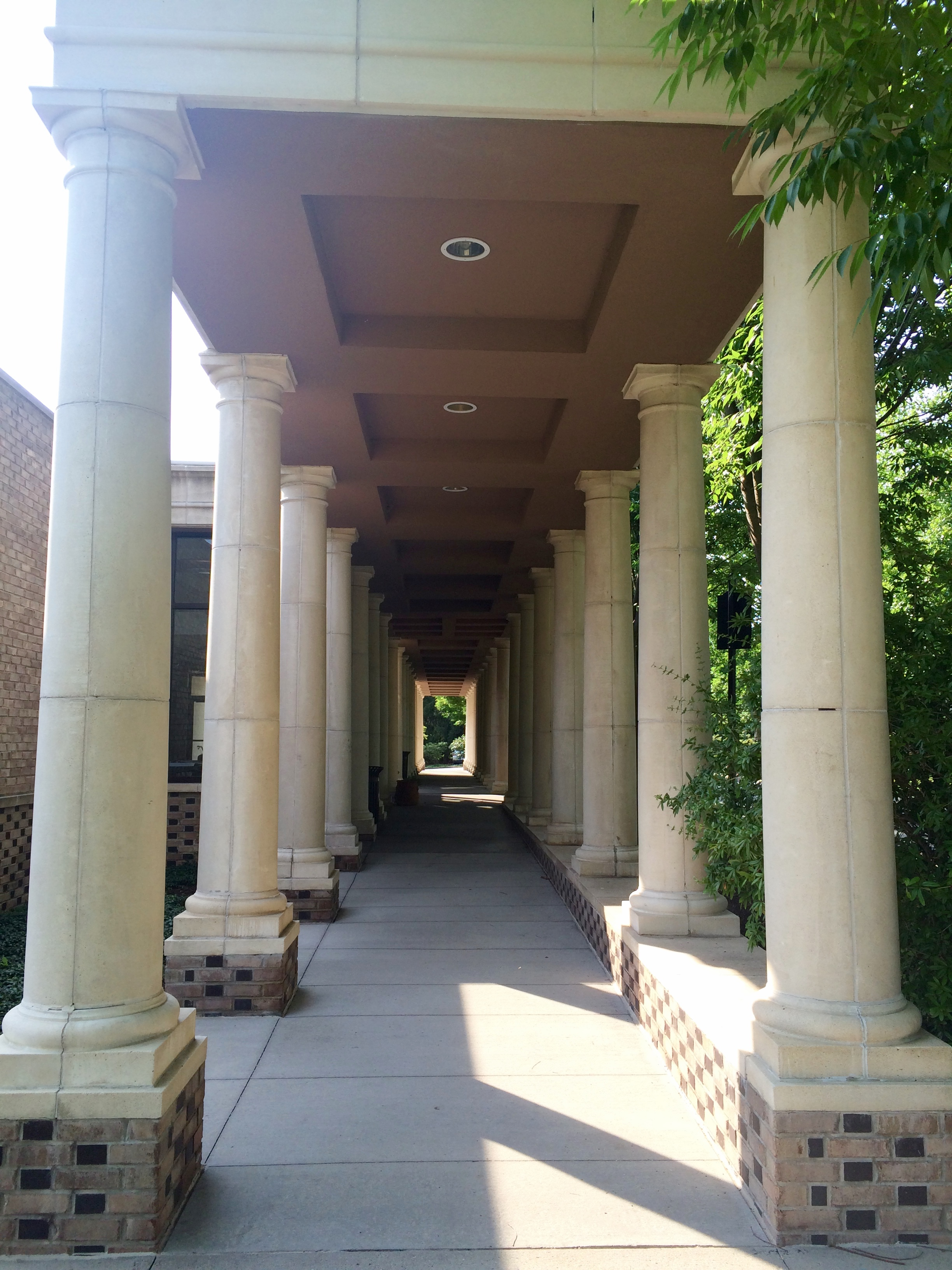
A colonnade

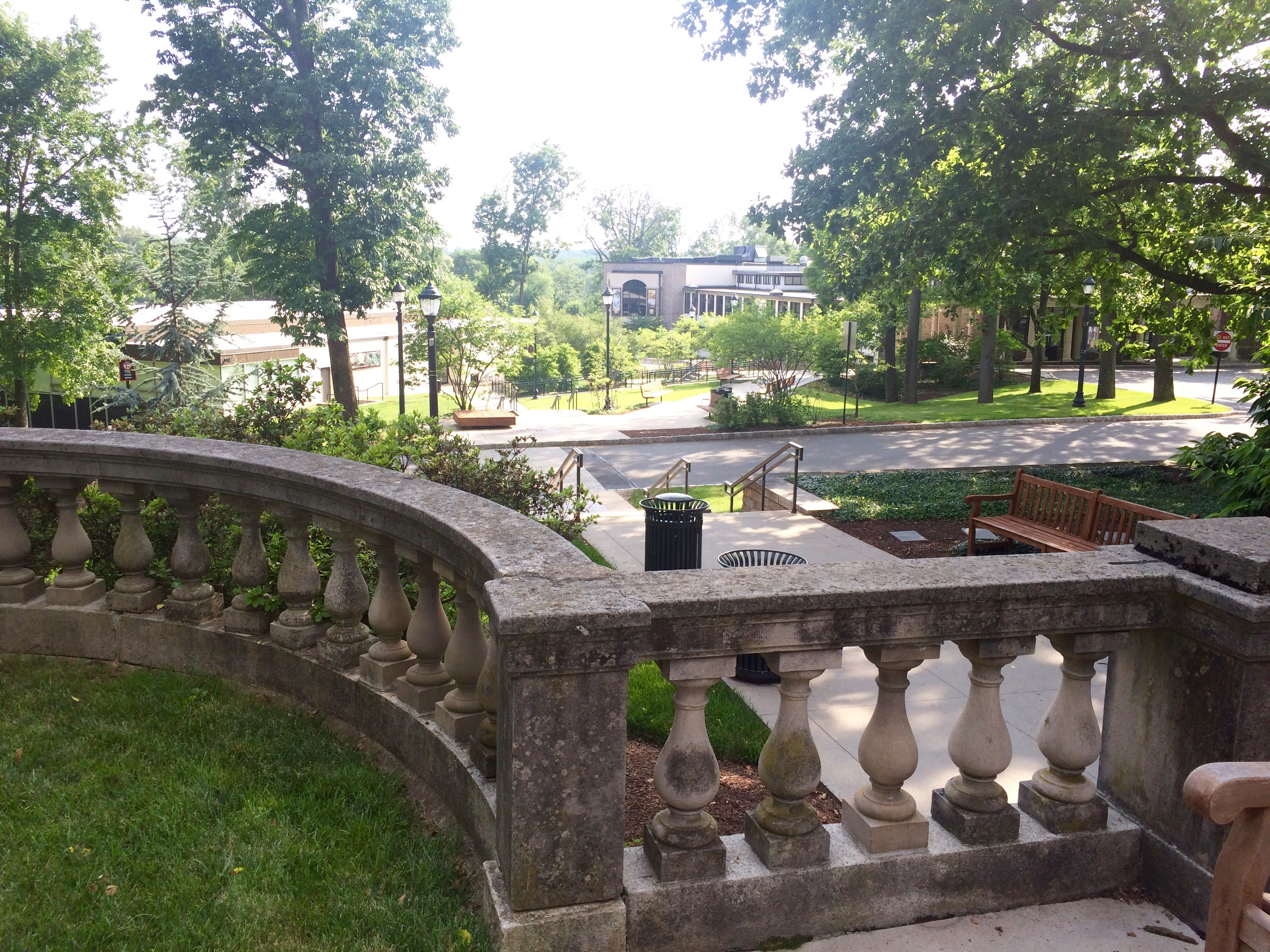
The campus from the porch of Edgerstoune

The Hun School facilities consist of multiple buildings across the small Princeton neighborhood. The school recently completed a massive renovation, including the construction of the Wilf Family Global Commons, a $9 million, 30,000 square feet (2,800 m^{2}) dormitory and educational facility. The School is currently undergoing a $5.5 million renovation of the Alexander K. Buck '49 Building, which holds middle school classrooms, video production laboratories, and gathering spaces.

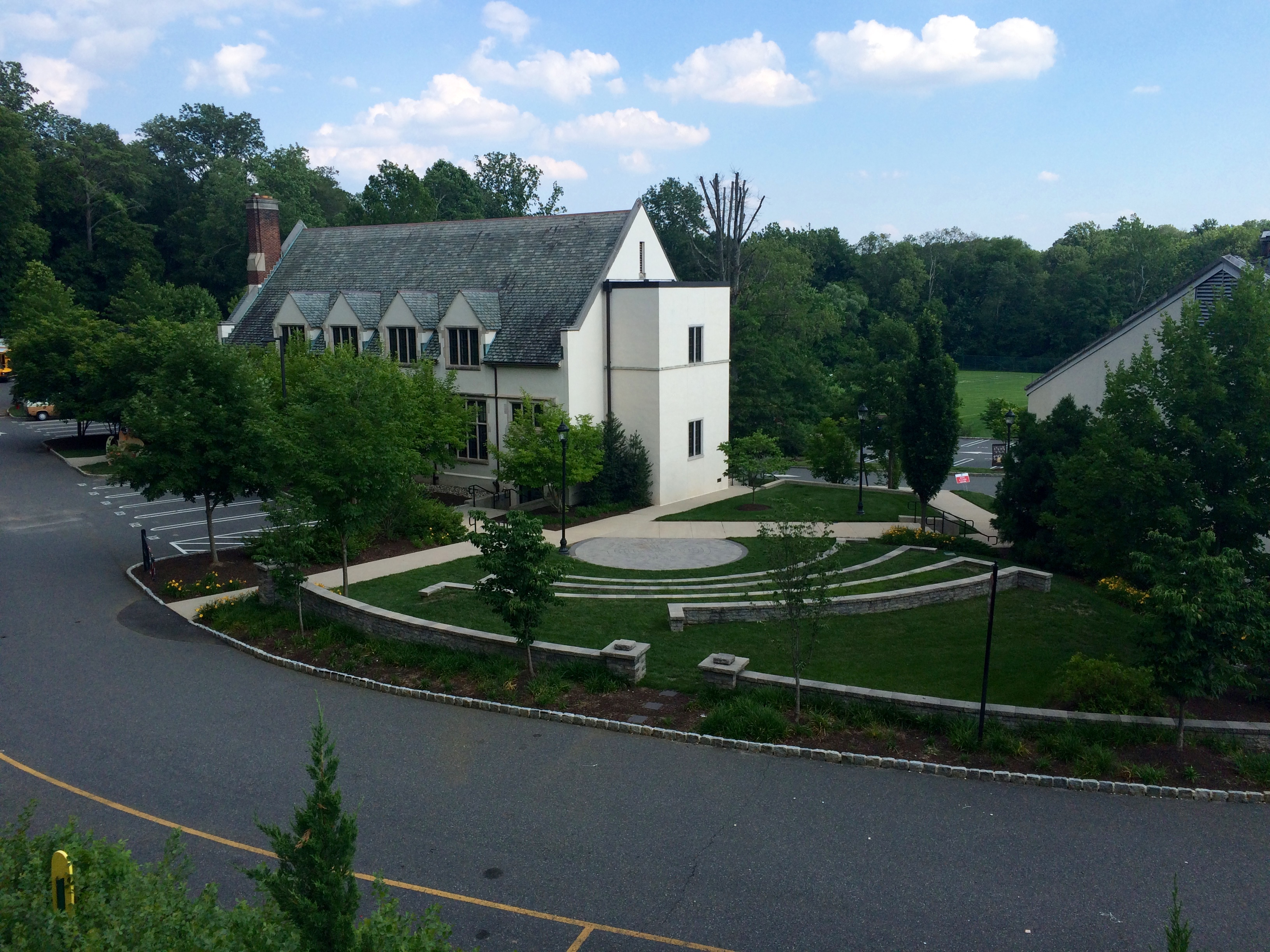
The fine arts building

- Russell Hall (1936)
- Poe Dormitory (1959) (deconstructed in 2024)
- Carter Hall (1964)
- The Alexander K. Buck Student Activity Center (1974) - The setting of the Middle School, serving grades 6-8
- The John Andrew Saks Auditorium
- The Chesebro Academic Center (1964) - Used as the Upper School
- The Ralph S. Mason House (1984)
- The Michael D. Dingman Center for Science and Technology (1987)
- The Perry K. Sellon Information Center (1987)
- The Roberta J. King Outdoor Education Center
- The Mary Miller Sharp Ceramic and Sculpture Studio (1994)
- The Finn M.W. Caspersen Rowing Center at Mercer Lake (2003)
- The Heart of Hun (2004)
- Natale Field (2004)
- The Ventresca Family Video Production and TV Studio (2005)
- Athletic Center (2007)
- The Shipley Pavilion (2007) - The Gymnasium
- The Landis Family Fine Arts Building (2008)
- The Wilf Family Global Commons (2014)
- 1992 Residence Hall (2025)

== School publications ==
- The Mall, Upper School newspaper
- The Edgerstounian, Upper School yearbook
- The Hun Review, a literary magazine showcasing the writing and artwork of Hun School students
- Hun Today, a magazine for alumni, families, and friends of The Hun School

== Notable alumni ==
- Kevin Scott Allen (born 1964), stage, film and television actor.
- Nicole Arendt (born 1969), professional tennis player
- Mitchell Block (1950–2024, class of 1968), documentary film maker whose film Poster Girl was nominated for an Academy Award for Best Documentary (Short Subject)
- John Bohlinger, (born 1967), musician
- Richard Cytowic (born 1952, class of 1970), neurologist and author of The Man Who Tasted Shapes
- Nick DeGennaro (born 2000), wide receiver for the New England Patriots
- Lew Elverson (1912–1997), college football player and coach, track and field coach, and college athletics administrator
- Dick Foran (1910–1979), actor known as the "Singing Cowboy," starred in Fort Apache, The Petrified Forest, and Black Legion
- Mike Ford (born 1992), first baseman for the New York Yankees
- Steve Garrison (born 1986), a major league pitcher for the New York Yankees
- Jamie Greubel (born 1983), bobsledder who won a Bronze medal at the 2014 Winter Olympics in the Two-woman Bobsleigh event
- Richard Guadagno, a passenger aboard United Airlines Flight 93 thought to have helped in the overtaking of the plane on September 11, 2001, terrorist attacks
- Ethan Hawke (born 1970, class of 1988), star of Dead Poets Society, Reality Bites, Gattaca, Training Day (Academy Award nomination for Best Supporting Actor), and Before Sunset (Academy Award nomination for Best Adapted Screenplay)
- Susan Hendricks (born 1973, class of 1991), CNN Headline News anchor
- Eric Jackson, the 47th Mayor of Trenton, New Jersey
- Tim Landis (born 1964), college football coach who is the offensive coordinator and quarterbacks coach for Bloomsburg University of Pennsylvania
- Jesse L. Lasky Jr. (1910-1988), screenwriter, novelist, playwright and poet
- David Liederman (1949–2024), chef and businessman best known for creating David's Cookies
- Robert E. Littell (1936–2014), New Jersey State Senator
- Leopoldo López (born 1971, class of 1989), opposition Venezuelan politician, founder and leader of Voluntad Popular
- Herb Maack (1917-2007), former Brooklyn Dodgers (AAFC) player and college football head coach
- Les Otten (born 1949), vice-chairman and partner of the Boston Red Sox
- Stephen Polin (born 1947, class of 1965), surrealist artist
- Jason Read (born 1977), bow seat in the 2004 Summer Olympics Gold medal-winning, U.S. Men's Rowing Team
- Myron Rolle (born 1986), Rhodes Scholar and safety for the Tennessee Titans
- Elliott Roosevelt (1910–1990), World War II aviation expert, author, and son of Franklin D. Roosevelt
- Khalid bin Faisal Al Saud (born 1940), Saudi prince who was Governor of 'Asir Province, now Governor of Mecca Province, director general of the King Faisal Foundation
- Saud bin Faisal Al Saud (1940-2015), Saudi prince, Foreign Minister of Saudi Arabia
- Camille Schrier (born 1995), Miss America 2020
- Alfred Dennis Sieminski (1911–1990), represented New Jersey's 13th congressional district from 1951–1959
- Paul Steiger (born 1942), managing editor of The Wall Street Journal, vice president of Dow Jones
- Tyler Stockton, college football coach and former player who serves as the defensive coordinator and inside linebackers coach at Ball State University
- Dan Topping (1912–1974), part owner and president of the New York Yankees baseball team from 1945 to 1964
- Shawn Tully (born 1948). business journalist at Fortune magazine
- Ryan Van Demark (born 1998), American football offensive tackle for the Buffalo Bills
- Luke Wafle (class of 2026), college football defensive end for the USC Trojans
- Caedan Wallace (born 2000), professional football guard for the New England Patriots
- Thomas Watson Jr. (1914–1993), former CEO of IBM and Ambassador to the Soviet Union under President Jimmy Carter
- Orin Wilf (born 1974), real estate developer
- Nick Williams (born 1990), former wide receiver for the Tennessee Titans
- William Wise III (born 1991, class of 2011), professional basketball player for the Eastern Mavericks of the NBL1 Central
