= List of University of Delaware people =

This is a list of alumni, current and former faculty of, and recipients of honorary degrees from, the University of Delaware.

== Alumni ==
=== Business ===
- Kurt Akeley (b. 1958), computer graphics engineer
- Barry J. Bentley, co-founder, Bentley Systems
- Keith A. Bentley, co-founder, Bentley Systems
- Mary Pat Christie (b. 1963), investment banker
- John P. Costas (b. 1957), CEO, UBS Investment Bank
- Michael F. Koehler, chief executive officer, Teradata
- Michael Mignano, businessperson
- Adam Osborne (1939–2003), computing pioneer
- Larry Probst (b. 1950), chairman of the board, Electronic Arts (formerly CEO); chairman of the U.S. Olympic Committee and member of the International Olympic Committee
- Ömer Sabancı (b. 1959), Turkish businessman
- Carl Truscott, senior vice president, ASERO Worldwide
- William Wascher, economist
- Wang Xing (b. 1979), CEO, Meituan-Dianping

=== Authors ===
- Steve Alten (b. 1959), science fiction author
- Jarret Brachman, terrorism author
- Siobhan Carroll (b. 1980), professor, scholar, writer
- Paul Cherry, business author
- Edward Ezell (1939–1993), author
- Martha Gandy Fales (1930–2006), art historian, curator
- Morrison Heckscher (b. 1940), art historian, curator
- Maureen Johnson (b. 1973), author
- Thomas Leitch (b. 1951), author, academic
- Jeff Pearlman (b. 1972), sports author
- Esther Tuttle Pritchard (1840–1900), minister, editor

=== Artists ===
- Michael Barone, art photographer
- Craig Cutler, photographer
- Linda Day Clark, photographer
- Tim Kreider (b. 1967), cartoonist

=== Politics ===
- Thurman Adams, Jr. (1928–2009), Democratic member of the Delaware Senate
- L. Heisler Ball (1861–1932), U.S. senator and U.S. congressman
- Jo Anne B. Barnhart (b. 1950), commissioner of Social Security
- Jill Biden (b. 1951), educator, 46th First Lady of the United States and former Second Lady of the United States as the wife of Joe Biden, president and former vice president of the United States
- Joe Biden (b. 1942) (Class of 1965), 45th president of the United States, 47th vice president of the United States, former U.S. senator, former chair of the Senate Foreign Relations Committee and Senate Judiciary Committee
- J. Caleb Boggs (1909–1993), U.S. senator, U.S. congressman, governor of Delaware
- David Brady (1937–2023), member of the Delaware House of Representatives
- John F. Brady (b. 1959), Delaware politician
- David P. Buckson (1920–2017), veteran of World War II and a member of the Republican Party, who served as the 15th lieutenant governor of Delaware, for nineteen days the 63rd governor of Delaware and the 37th attorney general of Delaware
- Eric Buckson, commissioner, Kent County Levy Court
- Daniel E. Button (1917–2009), U.S. congressman
- Theophilus C. Callicot (1826–1920), politician
- John Carney (b. 1956), U.S. congressman, governor of Delaware
- Thomas R. Carper (b. 1947), U.S. senator, U.S. congressman, and governor of Delaware
- Christopher Christie (b. 1962), governor of New Jersey
- Thomas Clayton (1777–1854), U.S. senator, U.S. congressman
- Carl Danberg (b. 1964), Delaware attorney general and commissioner of the Delaware Department of Correction
- Reha Denemeç (b. 1961), co-founder and deputy chairman (research and development) of the ruling Justice and Development Party (AK Parti) in Turkey
- Kendel Sibiski Ehrlich (b. 1961), First Lady of Maryland
- Lütfi Elvan (b. 1962), minister of Finance and Treasury, Turkey
- J. Allen Frear, Jr. (1903–1993), U.S. senator
- Don B. Hughes (b. 1940), Maryland state delegate
- Horace G. Knowles (1863–1937), diplomat
- John G. McCullough (1835–1915), attorney general of California and governor of Vermont
- Thomas McKean (1734–1817), Founding Father, signer of the Declaration of Independence
- Louis McLane (1786–1857), veteran of the War of 1812, U.S. senator, U.S. secretary of state, U.S. secretary of the treasury
- Louise Mushikiwabo (b. 1961), Rwandan foreign minister
- David Plouffe (b. 1967), campaign manager of the Barack Obama presidential campaign, 2008, political consultant, senior advisor to the president
- Mike Purzycki (b. 1945), 56th mayor of Wilmington, Delaware
- George Read (1733–1798), Founding Father, signer of the Declaration of Independence
- George R. Riddle (1817–1867), U.S. senator, U.S. congressman
- Janet Rzewnicki (born 1953), Delaware state treasurer
- Steve Schmidt (b. 1970), campaign manager of the John McCain presidential campaign, 2008, co-founder of The Lincoln Project, graduated in 2013
- James Smith (1719–1806), Founding Father, signer of the Declaration of Independence
- Nick Smith (b. 1934), U.S. Republican congressman from Michigan

=== Entertainment ===
- Susan Barnett (b. 1972), KYW-TV news anchor
- Colleen Broomall (b. 1983), actress
- Vincenza Carrieri-Russo (b. 1984), Miss Delaware USA 2008, Miss Delaware United States 2014
- Neil Casey (b. 1981), actor, comedian, writer
- Tommy Conwell (b. 1962), rock musician
- Amanda Debus (b. 1992), Miss Delaware 2016
- Antje Duvekot (b. 1976), singer/songwriter
- John Faye (b. 1966), rock musician
- Bryan Gordon, television and film director
- Suzanne Graff, actress
- Steve Harris (b. 1965), actor
- Vicki Hirsch, theater instructor and actress
- Page Kennedy, actor
- Amanda Longacre (b. 1989), Miss Delaware 2014
- Mark McClafferty, film and television producer, writer
- Matt O'Donnell (b. 1972), WPVI morning anchorman
- Marvell Scott (b. 1973), sports reporter for WABC-TV
- Susan Stroman (b. 1954), Broadway director, choreographer, performer
- Scott Swift, father of singer/songwriter Taylor Swift, played football for the Delaware Fightin' Blue Hens

=== Education ===
- John L. Anderson (b. 1945), president of Illinois Institute of Technology
- David L. Chicoine, president of South Dakota State University
- Lawrence A. Cunningham (b. 1962), scholar, author, and the Henry St. George Tucker III Research Professor of Law at George Washington University
- Charles F. Hummel (b. 1932), curator and deputy director at the Winterthur Museum, Garden and Library
- Rakesh Jain (b. 1950), professor of tumor biology at Harvard Medical School
- Dwight Lanmon (b. 1938), director of Corning Museum of Glass and Winterthur Museum, Garden and Library
- Steven Leath (b. 1957), president of Iowa State University
- Brian Lukacher, professor of art history at Vassar College
- Mary Patterson McPherson (c. 1935), former president of Bryn Mawr College
- Donald Mullett (1929–2013), interim president of Lincoln University (Pennsylvania), Lincoln University (Missouri), and Cheyney University
- Milo Naeve (1931–2009), art historian and curator at the Art Institute of Chicago
- Jules Prown (b. 1930), art historian and professor of art history at Yale University
- John A. H. Sweeney (1930–2007), curator and administrator at the Winterthur Museum
- James Vrentas (1936–2025), chemical engineer and professor of Pennsylvania State University
- James W. Wagner (b. 1953), president of Emory University

=== Judicial ===
- William B. Chandler, III, chancellor, Delaware Court of Chancery
- Hugh M. Morris (1878–1966), judge for the U.S. District Court for the District of Delaware
- Collins J. Seitz, chancellor of the Delaware Court of Chancery, Judge of the United States Court of Appeals for the Third Circuit, issued the judgment in the Gebhart v. Belton case, which was upheld in Brown v. Board of Education
- Leonard Stark (b. 1969), judge for the U.S. District Court for the District of Delaware
- Leo E. Strine, Jr. (b. 1964), chancellor, Delaware Court of Chancery
- John E. Wallace, Jr. (b. 1942), associate justice of the New Jersey Supreme Court

=== Journalism ===
- Rod Beaton (1951–2011), sports journalist for USA Today
- Katherine Boehret (b. 1980), journalist
- Colleen Broomall (b. 1983), journalist
- Jeff Gluck (b. 1980), motorsports journalist
- David E. Hoffman, writer. journalist, and Pulitzer Prize winner
- Jeff Pearlman (b. 1972), journalist

=== Military ===
- Charles Craig Cannon (1914–1992), United States Army officer who served as aide-de-camp to Dwight D. Eisenhower after World War II
- John M. Custer III, United States Army officer
- Joseph H. Harper (1901–1990), World War II airborne officer, who later commanded the United States Army Infantry School
- Robert W. Kirkwood (1756–1791), American Revolutionary War officer; died in 1791 during the battle of St. Clair's Defeat
- Julian Smith (1885–1975), World War II United States Marine Corps general

=== Science ===
- Rakesh Agrawal, National Medal of Technology and Innovation laureate and professor of Chemical Engineering at Purdue University
- Brian Atwater (b. 1951), geologist
- Doreen Bogdan-Martin (b. 1966), secretary-general of the International Telecommunication Union
- Terrell Ward Bynum (b. 1941), director of the Research Center on Computing and Society at Southern Connecticut State University, professor of Philosophy
- Carole Chaski (b. 1955), forensic linguist
- Roger Craig (c. 1977), computer scientist and Jeopardy! champion
- Robert W. Gore (1937–2020), inventor of Gore-Tex fabrics
- Walter Lafferty (1875–1964), optical physicist
- Daniel Lau, electrical engineer
- Holly Michael, hydrogeologist
- David L. Mills (b. 1938), Internet pioneer
- Daniel Nathans (1928–1999), biologist and Nobel Prize winner
- G. Raymond Rettew (1903–1973), chemist and pioneer of mass production of penicillin
- Siddhartha Roy (b. 1954), structural biologist, Shanti Swarup Bhatnagar laureate
- Mohsen Shahinpoor (b. 1943), engineer
- Peter Thejll (b. 1956), astrophysicist, climate expert
- John T. Trumble, entomologist
- Lodewijk van den Berg (b. 1932), astronaut
- Lynn M. Walker, fellow of the American Institute of Chemical Engineers

=== Religion ===
- Isaiah DeGrasse (1813–1841), minister and first African American alumnus

=== Sports ===
- Mike Adams (b. 1981), professional football player
- Nasir Adderley (b. 1997), professional football player
- Robbie Agnone (b. 1985), football player
- Dawn Aponte (c. 1971), football executive
- Petar Arsić (b. 1973), basketball player
- Josh Baker (b. 1986), football player
- Bryan Barrett (b. 1977), lacrosse player
- Nate Beasley (1953–2010), football player
- Urban Bowman (1937–2018), American football and Canadian football coach
- Cliff Brumbaugh (b. 1974), MLB player
- Scott Brunner (b. 1957), football player
- Nick Bucci (1932–2019), football player
- Michael Byrne (b. 1986), football player
- Bob Carpenter, Jr. (1915–1990), former owner of the Philadelphia Phillies
- Brennan Carroll (b. 1979), football coach
- Larry Catuzzi (c. 1935), football coach
- Chris Collins (b. 1982), lacrosse player
- Bill Cubit (b. 1953), football coach
- Mondoe Davis (b. 1982), football and Canadian football player
- Richard Dean (1956–2006), fashion and advertising photographer, former player for Canadian Football League
- Elena Delle Donne (b. 1989), WNBA player with the Washington Mystics; played basketball and volleyball at Delaware
- Pat Devlin (b. 1988), quarterback for the NFL Miami Dolphins
- Anthony DiMarzo, lacrosse player
- Leon Dombrowski (1938–1998), football player
- Marc Egerson (b. 1986), basketball player
- Jamin Elliott (b. 1979), football player
- Joe Flacco (b. 1985), football player
- Eric Fromm (b. 1958), tennis player
- Keevin Galbraith (b. 1979), lacrosse player
- Rich Gannon (b. 1965), football player / NFL analyst CBS Sports
- Brian Gorman (b. 1959), MLB umpire
- Gino Gradkowski (b. 1988), football player
- John Grant, Jr. (b. 1974), lacrosse player
- Dallas Green (1934–2017), MLB player and manager
- Scott Green (b. 1951), NFL referee
- Bob Greene (b. 1958), fitness guru
- Andy Hall (b. 1980), football player
- Jordan Hall (b. 1984), lacrosse player
- Conway Hayman (1949–2020), football player
- Mickey Heinecken (b. 1939), football coach
- Tim Jacobs (b. 1970), football player
- Cindy A. Johnson, basketball player
- Dennis Johnson (b. 1951), football player
- Gardy Kahoe (1950–2010), football player
- K. C. Keeler (b. 1959), football coach
- Jeff Komlo (1956–2009), football player
- Mike Koplove (b. 1976), MLB player
- Chad Kuhl (b. 1992), MLB player
- Peter Maestrales (b. 1979), baseball player and Olympian (2004)
- Kęstutis Marčiulionis (b. 1977), basketball player
- Joe McGrail (b. 1964), football player
- Joe McHale (b. 1963), football player
- Tom Mees (1949–1996), ESPN anchor
- Kevin Mench (b. 1978), baseball player
- Joe Minucci (b. 1981), football player
- Jeff Modesitt (1964–1990), football player
- Matt Nagy (b. 1978), football player and coach
- Harding Nana (b. 1981), basketball player
- Al Neiger (b. 1939), baseball player
- Mohamed Niang (b. 1976), basketball player
- Ben Patrick (b. 1984), football player
- Bob Patton (b. 1954), football player
- Mike Pegues (b. 1978), basketball player and coach
- Jim Quirk (b. 1940), football official
- Raven (b. 1964), a.k.a. Scott Levy, professional wrestler
- Dan Reeder (b. 1961), football player
- Steve Schlachter (b. 1954), American-Israeli basketball player
- George Schmitt (b. 1961), football player
- Tyresa Smith (b. 1985), basketball player
- Tony Storti (1922–2009), football coach and college athletics administrator
- Jon Striefsky (b. 1986), football player
- Ivory Sully (b. 1957), football player
- Joe Susan (b. 1955), football coach
- Ronald Talley (b. 1986), football player
- Hal Thompson (1922–2006), football player
- Anthony Walters (b. 1988), football player
- Richard Washington (b. 1985), football player
- Vic Willis (1876–1947), Hall of Fame baseball player
- Paul Worrilow (b. 1990), football player

== Honorary degree recipients ==
- Byong Man Ahn (born 1941), 2004, academic
- Robert Ballard (b. 1942), 2001, oceanographer, discoverer of the RMS Titanic
- Joe Biden (b. 1942), 2004, president of the United States, vice president of the United States, former United States senator (D-Delaware)
- John C. Bogle (1929–2019), 1999, founder and CEO of The Vanguard Group
- Ben Carson (b. 1951), M.D., 1997, neurosurgeon
- Alfred D. Chandler, Jr. (1918–2007), 2002, business historian
- Rita R. Colwell (b. 1934), 2003, former director of the National Science Foundation
- Louis Freeh (b. 1950), 1999, former director of the Federal Bureau of Investigation (FBI)
- Adrian Hall (b. 1959), 2007, British actor, thespian
- Daisaku Ikeda (b. 1928), 2000, Buddhist religious leader, President of Soka Gakkai International
- Paul R. Jones (1928–2010), 2004, art collector, Paul R. Jones Collection of African American Art
- Audrey F. Manley (b. 1934), 2002, former United States Surgeon General; president of Spelman College
- Geoffrey Marcy (b. 1954), 2004, astronomer, discoverer of the first extrasolar planet, 51 Pegasi b
- J. W. Marriott, Jr. (b. 1932), 2005, Marriott International
- Mary McAleese (b. 1951), 2002, president of Ireland
- George J. Mitchell (b. 1933), 2003, former United States senator (D-Maine)
- Joseph Neubauer (b. 1941), 2006, CEO of ARAMARK
- Russell W. Peterson (1916–2011), 2006, former governor of Delaware, scientist
- Martin A. Pomerantz (1916–2008), 2001, physicist and astronomer
- Cal Ripken Jr. (b. 1960), 2008, baseball player
- William V. Roth (1921–2003), 2003, former United States senator (R-Delaware)
- W. D. Snodgrass (1926–2009), 2005, Pulitzer Prize-winning poet
- Walter K. Stapleton (b. 1934), 1998, federal judge on the United States Court of Appeals for the Third Circuit
- Susan Stroman (b. 1954), 2005, Tony Award-winning Broadway director, choreographer, film director, and performer.
- E. Norman Veasey (b. 1933), 2003, chief justice of the Delaware Supreme Court
- Craig Venter (1946–2026), 2004, biologist, founder of the Institute for Genomic Research
- Paul A. Volcker (1927–2019), 2001, former chairman of the Federal Reserve
- John J. Williams (1904–1988), 1975, former United States senator (R-Delaware)
- Jamie Wyeth (b. 1946), 2002, realist painter

== Faculty ==
- Gene Ball, Computer Science
- Allen Barnett (b. 1940), Electrical Engineering and Computer Science
- Ralph Begleiter (b. 1949), Communications & Political Science, Distinguished Journalist in Residence
- Joel Best (b. 1946), Sociology & Criminal Justice, 2012 Francis Allison Faculty Award winner
- Mark Bowden (b. 1951), Distinguished Writer in Residence
- E. Wayne Craven (1930–2020), Art History
- Bill Fleischman (1939–2019), sports journalist and adjunct professor in journalism (1981–2009)
- Eric M. Furst, chemical engineer
- Xiang Gao, world-class violinist
- Linda Gottfredson (b. 1947), Educational Psychology
- Richard Hanley, Philosophy
- Donald West Harward, Philosophy, former president of Bates College
- Richard F. Heck (1931–2015), Chemistry, discoverer of Heck reaction, 2010 Nobel Prize in Chemistry laureate
- Christine Leigh Heyrman, History
- William Innes Homer (1929–2012), Art History
- Muqtedar Khan (b. 1966), Political Science
- Peter Kolchin (b. 1943), History
- Mark Samuels Lasner (b. 1952), senior research fellow
- David Legates, Climatology
- Leo Lemay (1935–2008), English
- David L. Mills (b. 1938), Electrical and Computer Engineering
- Frederick Nelson (1932–2009), professor of geography and director of University of Delaware's Permafrost Group
- Debra Hess Norris, chair of the art conservation department and director of the Winterthur/University of Delaware Program in Art Conservation
- David L. Norton (1930–1995), Philosophy
- R. Byron Pipes (b. 1941), Mechanical Engineering
- William Poole (b. 1937), Economics; former president of the Federal Reserve Bank of St. Louis; scholar in residence; former professor at Brown University and Johns Hopkins University
- Martin Postle, Art History
- Christine Rawak, former athletic director
- Ramnarayan Rawat, History
- Arnold L. Rheingold (b. 1940), Chemistry
- W. David Sincoskie (1954–2010), Computer Engineering
- David Smith (b. 1948), Biology
- Elaine Salo (1962–2016), Anthropology and gender studies
- Millicent Sullivan, professor of Biomedical Engineering
- Jacob Joseph Taubenhaus (1884–1937), Plant Pathology (1909 to 1916)
- Charles Tilly (1929–2008), social scientist
- Bahira Trask Anthropologist, academic and author
- Don A. J. Upham (1809–1877), Mathematics; owner and editor of The Delaware Gazette for three years
- Barbara A. Williams, Astrophysics
- Shien Biau Woo (b. 1937), Physics and Astronomy, former lieutenant governor of Delaware
- Ben Yagoda (b. 1954), English

== List of presidents ==
Although the University of Delaware claims it originated in a one -oom school founded by the Rev. Dr. Francis Alison in 1743 in New London, Pennsylvania, this list is restricted to individuals who held office since 1834.

The following persons have served as president of the University of Delaware:

No.	Image	President	Term start	Term end	Ref.
Presidents of Newark College (1833–1843)
1a		Eliphalet Wheeler Gilbert	1834	1835	
2		Richard Sharpe Mason	1835	1840	
1b		Eliphalet Wheeler Gilbert	1840	1847	
Presidents of Delaware College (1843–1921)
3		James Patriot Wilson, Jr.	1847	1850	
4		William Augustus Norton	1850	1850	
5		Matthew Meigs	1850	1851	
6		Walter Scott Finney Graham	1851	1854 (Note: Died in office)	
7		Daniel Kirkwood	1854	1859	
8		Ellis James Newlin	1856	1859	
interim 9		George Franklin Wiswell	1859	1859	
10		Rathmell Wilson	1859	1870	
11		William Henry Purnell	1870	1885	
12		John Hollis Caldwell	1885	1888 (Note: Forced to resign by trustees)	
interim 13		Lewis Potter Bush	1888	1888	
14		Albert Newton Raub	1888	1896	
15		George Abram Harter	1896	1914	
16		Samuel Chiles Mitchell	1914	1920	
Presidents of University of Delaware (1921–present)
17		Walter Hullihen	1920	1944	
18		Wilbur Owen Sypherd	1944	1946	
19		William Samuel Carlson	1946	1950	
interim 20		Allan Philip Colburn	1950	1950	
21		John Alanson Perkins	1950	1967 (Note: Resigned to lead Dun & Bradstreet)	
interim 22		John William Shirley (Note: Provost)	1967	1968	
23a		Edward Arthur Trabant	1968	June 30, 1987	
24		Russel C. Jones	July 1, 1987	October 24, 1988	
acting		Edward R. Pierce	October 24, 1988	October 26, 1988	
23b		Edward Arthur Trabant	October 26, 1988	April 30, 1990	
25		David P. Roselle	May 1, 1990	June 30, 2007	
26		Patrick T. Harker	July 1, 2007	June 30, 2015 (Note: Resigned to lead the Federal Reserve Bank of Philadelphia)	
acting 27		Nancy Targett	July 1, 2015	June 30, 2016	
28		Dennis Assanis	July 1, 2016	June 30, 2025	
interim		Laura Carlson	July 1, 2025	December 31, 2025	
29		Laura Carlson	January 1, 2026	present	

Table notes:
