= Hugh R. Sharp =

American businessman, aviator, and university trustee

Hugh Rodney Sharp Jr. (November 21, 1909 – December 9, 1990) was an American businessman, aviator, and university trustee. He worked nearly half a century for the DuPont corporation, which was founded by his great-great-grandfather.

== Education and career ==
Sharp was born in Wilmington, Delaware, the son of Hugh Rodney Sharp Sr. and Isabella Mathieu du Pont. His mother was a member of the Du Pont family, the daughter of chemist Lammot du Pont I. Rodney was the great-great grandson of the company's founder, Éleuthère Irénée du Pont. He attended the University of Delaware, which has a long relationship with the Du Ponts.

Sharp worked for the DuPont corporation for almost 50 years, and spent 30 years on the board of directors. from 1952–82.

=== Civil Air Patrol ===
On March 5, 1943, the Civil Air Patrol in Rehoboth Beach, Delaware, began coastal patrols under Major Sharp, and spotted their first German U-boat on March 10 off Cape May, New Jersey.

Major Sharp and fellow Delawarean Lt. Ed Edwards were honored in U.S. President Franklin Roosevelt's office in Washington, D.C., for a daring sea rescue with the Civil Air Patrol off Rehoboth Beach, Delaware.

He was also a recipient of the British Military Cross, the French Croix de Guerre, and Italian Order of Valour.

=== University of Delaware ===
On May 18, 1994, the Lewes Campus at the University of Delaware was renamed in his honor. Hugh R. Sharp was an alumnus from the University of Delaware, university trustee (1969–1988) and longtime supporter of the university's College of Marine Studies.

His estate and the university shared the cost of the RV Hugh R. Sharp, a research vessel also named in his honor.

== See also ==
- List of aviators
- List of University of Delaware people
