= Delaware Fightin' Blue Hens men's lacrosse =

- Founded: 1948; 78 years ago
- University: University of Delaware
- Head coach: Ben DeLuca (since 2018 season)
- Stadium: Delaware Stadium (capacity: 16,730)
- Location: Newark, Delaware
- Conference: Atlantic 10
- Nickname: Fightin' Blue Hens
- Colors: Royal blue and gold

NCAA Tournament Final Fours
- 2007

NCAA Tournament Quarterfinals
- 1984, 1999, 2007, 2022

NCAA Tournament appearances
- (8) 1984, 1999, 2005, 2007, 2010, 2011, 2022, 2023

Conference Tournament championships
- 2007, 2010, 2011, 2022, 2023

Conference regular season championships
- (24) 1961, 1962, 1970, 1971, 1975, 1976, 1977, 1978, 1979, 1980, 1981, 1982, 1984, 1985, 1986, 1992, 1993, 1994, 1999, 2000, 2005, 2021, 2022, 2023

The Delaware Fightin' Blue Hens men's lacrosse team represents the University of Delaware in NCAA Division I men's college lacrosse. Delaware currently competes as a member of the Atlantic 10 Conference (A-10) and plays its home games at Delaware Stadium in Newark, Delaware.

== History ==
Head coach Bob Shillinglaw led the Blue Hens for over 30 years and is only the second man to coach 500 lacrosse games.

In 2007, Delaware was ranked 15th in the country heading into the 2007 NCAA tournament. The team had won seven games in a row and the CAA tournament. Delaware advanced to the semifinals (Final Four), defeating #2 Virginia before losing to Johns Hopkins 8–3. It marked the team's only NCAA Final Four.

In the program's history, Delaware has produced several notable players, including NCAA Player of the Year John Grant, Jr. among the world's best lacrosse players, Anthony DiMarzo among the all-time leaders in Division I career assists, Jordan Hall of the Major League Lacrosse Rochester Rattlers, Matt Alrich, Chris Collins, Keevin Galbraith, and Curtis Dickson.

In 2022, the Delaware Blue Hens upset the #2 ranked Georgetown Hoyas in the first round of the NCAA Tournament before losing to Cornell 10-8 in the Quarterfinals.

The Hens have won 6 NCAA Tournament games in 8 tournaments.

In November 2023, Delaware announced plans to leave the CAA for Conference USA, beginning on July 1, 2025. On May 21, 2024, it was announced that Delaware would join the Atlantic 10 Conference as a lacrosse-only member beginning play in 2026 as Conference USA does not sponsor the sport.

== Yearly results ==
The following is a list of Delaware's results by season as an NCAA Division I program:

Season	Coach	Overall	Conference	Standing	Postseason
Mickey Heinecken (Middle Atlantic Conference) (1966–1972)
1971	Mickey Heinecken	9–3	8–2	1st	
1972	Mickey Heinecken	8–3	6–2	3rd	
Mickey Heinecken:		65–37 (.637)	53–21 (.716)		
Jim Grube (Middle Atlantic Conference) (1973–1974)
1973	Jim Grube	5–8	5–4		
1974	Jim Grube	7–5	4–4		
Jim Grube (East Coast Conference) (1975–1978)
1975	Jim Grube	10–2	4–0	1st	
1976	Jim Grube	11–1	4–0	1st	
1977	Jim Grube	9–4	4–0	1st	
1978	Jim Grube	7–7	3–1	1st	
Jim Grube:		49–27 (.645)	24–9 (.727)		
Bob Shillinglaw (East Coast Conference) (1979–1991)
1979	Bob Shillinglaw	13–2	4–0	1st	
1980	Bob Shillinglaw	8–8	4–0	1st	
1981	Bob Shillinglaw	8–8	4–0	1st	
1982	Bob Shillinglaw	6–10	4–0	1st	
1983	Bob Shillinglaw	8–8	4–1	2nd	
1984	Bob Shillinglaw	12–4	5–0	1st	NCAA Division I Quarterfinals
1985	Bob Shillinglaw	9–7	4–1	T–1st	
1986	Bob Shillinglaw	10–6	6–0	1st	
1987	Bob Shillinglaw	8–8	5–1	2nd	
1988	Bob Shillinglaw	6–10	4–2	2nd	
1989	Bob Shillinglaw	8–8	5–1	3rd	
1990	Bob Shillinglaw	7–9	4–2	3rd	
1991	Bob Shillinglaw	6–10	3–1	2nd	
Bob Shillinglaw (America East Conference) (1992–2001)
1992	Bob Shillinglaw	8–7	4–0	1st	
1993	Bob Shillinglaw	5–9	4–0	1st	
1994	Bob Shillinglaw	8–6	4–0	1st	
1995	Bob Shillinglaw	6–9	4–1	2nd	
1996	Bob Shillinglaw	8–7	4–2	3rd	
1997	Bob Shillinglaw	3–12	2–4	5th	
1998	Bob Shillinglaw	9–6	3–2	2nd	
1999	Bob Shillinglaw	14–3	5–0	1st	NCAA Division I Quarterfinals
2000	Bob Shillinglaw	10–6	4–1	T–1st	
2001	Bob Shillinglaw	6–9	3–2	3rd	
Bob Shillinglaw (Colonial Athletic Association) (2002–2017)
2002	Bob Shillinglaw	3–11	0–6	7th	
2003	Bob Shillinglaw	5–10	0–5	6th	
2004	Bob Shillinglaw	10–6	2–3	T–3rd	
2005	Bob Shillinglaw	11–6	4–1	T–1st	NCAA Division I First Round
2006	Bob Shillinglaw	12–5	3–3	T–3rd	
2007	Bob Shillinglaw	13–6	4–2	3rd	NCAA Division I Final Four
2008	Bob Shillinglaw	9–7	3–3	T–3rd	
2009	Bob Shillinglaw	5–10	2–4	T–5th	
2010	Bob Shillinglaw	10–7	3–2	T–2nd	NCAA Division I First Round
2011	Bob Shillinglaw	11–7	4–2	T–2nd	NCAA Division I First Round
2012	Bob Shillinglaw	6–9	1–5	T–6th	
2013	Bob Shillinglaw	5–10	1–5	T–6th	
2014	Bob Shillinglaw	7–9	1–4	T–5th	
2015	Bob Shillinglaw	5–10	1–4	6th	
2016	Bob Shillinglaw	5–10	2–3	T–4th	
2017	Bob Shillinglaw	7–8	0–5	6th	
Bob Shillinglaw:		310–303 (.506)	124–79 (.611)		
Ben DeLuca (Colonial Athletic Association) (2018–2025)
2018	Ben DeLuca	6–8	3–2	T–2nd	
2019	Ben DeLuca	10–5	3–2	3rd	
2020	Ben DeLuca	4–2	0–0	†	†
2021	Ben DeLuca	10–3	7–1	1st	
2022	Ben DeLuca	13–6	3–2	T–1st	NCAA Division I Quarterfinals
2023	Ben DeLuca	13–5	6–1	1st	NCAA Division I First Round
2024	Ben DeLuca	9–5	6–1	2nd	
2025	Ben DeLuca	7–6	3–4	T–5th	
Ben DeLuca (Atlantic 10 Conference) (2026–present)
2026	Ben DeLuca	1–5	0–0		
Ben DeLuca:		73–45 (.619)	31–13 (.705)		
Total:		576–501–3 (.535)			
National champion Postseason invitational champion Conference regular season champion Conference regular season and conference tournament champion Division regular season champion Division regular season and conference tournament champion Conference tournament champion

†NCAA canceled 2020 collegiate activities due to the COVID-19 virus.

== See also ==
- NCAA Men's Lacrosse Championship
- Wingate Memorial Trophy
