= American Education Society =

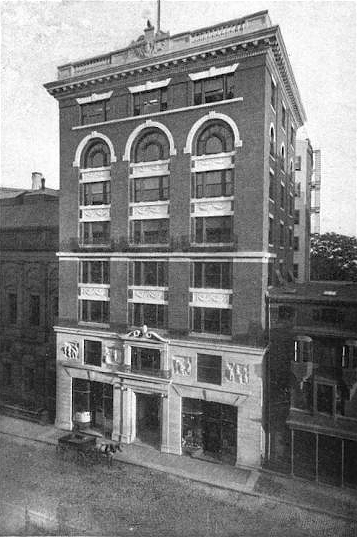
The Congregational House of the American Education Society, Boston, 1899

American Society for the Education of Pious Youth for the Gospel Ministry was organized in 1815 for the purpose of raising funds for college expenses of young men aiming to become Protestant clergymen. It was renamed American Education Society (AES) in 1820, It was formed under a deep conviction that there was a deficiency of well qualified Protestant ministers, and that no method of supplying this deficiency appeared to be so effectual as that of educating, for the ministry, young men of suitable character who did not the means of educating themselves. Later name changes included American College and Education Society (1874) and Congregational Education Society (1894).

== Origin ==
In the early part of July 1815, a few individuals, including Congregational clergy affiliated with the Andover Theological Seminary, in Boston, Massachusetts, having become convinced of the necessity of greatly increasing the number of well qualified Protestant ministers, determined to make a special effort to accomplish the object. A meeting was convened in the vestry of Park Street Meeting House, July 20, 1815. Rev. Eliphalet Pearson, was called to the chair. It was voted to form a society, for the purpose of assisting young men, of proper qualifications, in their education for the ministry. A committee was appoint to draft a constitution, to be reported at a future meeting. This meeting was held in Boston, August 29, 1815, and attended by about 50 men. A constitution was reported and adopted article by article.

== History ==
On December 7, 1815, the society was organized. Lt. Gov. Phillips was chosen President, and a board of directors appointed. The board held their first meeting on the same day. March 4, 1816, four beneficiaries were received.

The society was incorporated December 1816, by the legislature of Massachusetts. But as the name first given, "The American Society for Educating Pious Youth for the Christian Ministry" was found to be practically inconvenient, in 1820, on application of the Society, the Legislature changed the name to "The American Education Society".

In adopting a plan of organization, the founders of the Society aimed at establishing a system which should be simple and efficient, and which at the same time would admit of an easy extension over a wide territory. With this view, a "General", or Parent Society was instituted, composed of those who were members for life at the time of the annual meeting in May 1826; and of such others as shall hereafter be elected into it by ballot. In this Society was lodged the supreme and ultimate direction of all the concerns of the Institution. Its rules and regulations were conformed to by all who were patronized by its funds.

The Society did not have buildings, and libraries, and a local establishment, to give it visibility like other institutions because the Directors wished to scatter their beneficiaries as widely as possible in other institutions.

By the 1830s about a fourth of the American college students intending to become ministers were supported by the Society or by similar organizations operated by other Protestant denominations.

From the start of their operations, the Directors felt it was their duty in selecting candidates for the patronage of the Society, to give the preference to those who desired obtaining a thorough preparation for the ministry. They were convinced that the circumstances of the times demanded that those who were invested with the ministry should have every advantage which a course of liberal education could give them.

Scholarships were funded by individuals, and by societies. Sometimes it was done by a single donation, and sometimes by a subscription for a term of years. In occasional instances, donors reserved the privilege of selecting the beneficiary to be placed upon their foundation, the person so patronized conforming in all respects to the rules and regulations of the Society; but in general the selection was left with the Directors.

The Presbyterian Education Society was founded in 1819, became a branch of the AES in 1827, and operated as such until the break in the Presbyterian Church. The Society for the Promotion of Collegiate and Theological Education in the West was organized in 1844, and operated as a separate society till 1874, at which time it joined with the AES. In 1874, the AES, which had worked mainly by grants to students, was combined with the Society for the Promotion of Collegiate and theological Education in the West, which had operated by making grants to colleges.

In 1874, the AES and the Society for the Promotion of Collegiate and Theological Education merged as the "American College and Education Society". In 1894, it was renamed "Congregational Education Society".

== Branches ==
For the sake of greater facility, as well as safety, in managing the concerns of the institution, branch societies were formed in different states and sections of the country. Each branch had, by the constitution, a board of directors, whose business it was to superintend that part of the general interest which was entrusted to its care by the parent society. It had a special treasury; examined and received, in concert with the parent society, beneficiaries; and appropriated the funds in its treasury to their support. If there was a deficiency of resources, application was made to the general treasury; or, if there was a surplus, it was remitted to the general treasury. Thus, every branch cooperated with the general society, and acted in subserviency to the same object. The influence of the general society became co-extensive with that of its branches. Its funds included all which flowed directly into its own treasury; and all which passed into the subordinate treasuries; while the number of its beneficiaries included all those who were placed under the special care of the different branch societies, as well as those who were under its own immediate supervision.

== Legacy ==
The society's papers are held at the Congregational Library & Archives, Boston.

== See also ==
- Congregationalism in the United States

== Notable people ==
- Orville Dewey
- Bela Bates Edwards
- Eliphalet Wheeler Gilbert
- John Wheeler Leavitt
- David Nelson
- William Patton
- Eliphalet Pearson
- Leonard Woods
