= John Wheeler Leavitt =

American businessman (1790–1870)

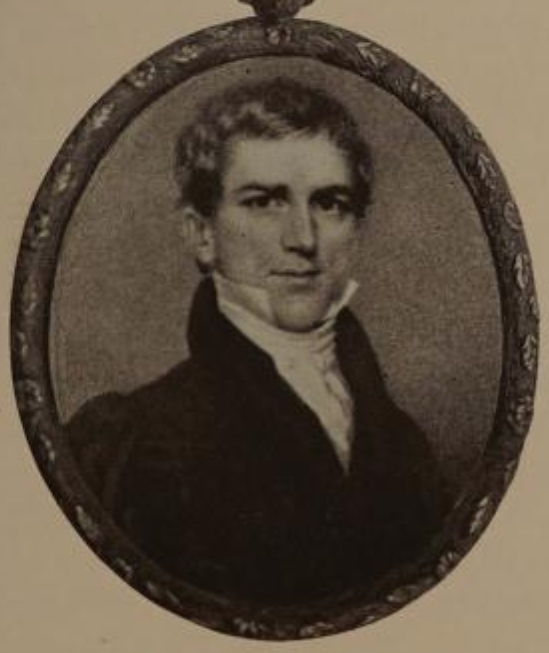
- 19th-century portrait of Leavitt
- Born: July 3, 1790; Washington, Connecticut, U.S.
- Died: July 17, 1870 (aged 80); New York City, U.S.
- Burial place: New York Marble Cemetery
- Occupations: Merchant; financer; businessman
- Known for: Founder of J. W. & R. Leavitt Company
- Spouse: Cecilia Kent (m. 1820)
- Children: 8
- Relatives: Cecilia Beaux (granddaughter)

John Wheeler Leavitt (July 3, 1790 – July 17, 1870) an American merchant, financer, and businessman. He was the founder of J. W. & R. Leavitt Company, eventually declared insolvent, and grandfather of American society portrait painter Cecilia Beaux, who frequently painted members of the family.

Leavitt ran the family-owned trading partnership, and was one of the most prominent businessmen of his age until financial reverses caused the bankruptcy of the firm. In spite of the financial reverses, Leavitt and his wife went on to help raise their granddaughter painter Beaux after her mother died shortly after she was born and her French father fled back to France.

== Biography ==
John Wheeler Leavitt was born July 3, 1790, at Washington, Connecticut, the son of Samuel Leavitt and Lydia Wheeler Leavitt. John W. Leavitt's father Samuel came from a branch of a Massachusetts family which had settled in Connecticut in the 18th century, and Samuel later served as representative to the Connecticut General Assembly from Washington. On August 22, 1820, Samuel's merchant son John Wheeler Leavitt married Cecilia Kent, who was from an old Suffield, Connecticut, family, with whom the Leavitts had extensively intermarried. (Today's Kent Memorial Library in Suffield is named for the family.)

John Wheeler Leavitt moved to New York City at a young age, where he entered into business with his brother Rufus in the firm they called "J. W. & R. Leavitt". Operating primarily as traders, sometimes with first cousin David Leavitt, the pair bought and sold nearly everything, including real estate in Illinois and Georgia. Leavitt made an early splash, serving as one of the founders of the Mutual Life Insurance Company. As early as 1828, Leavitt was named a co-founder and initial sponsor of the Mercantile Library of New York City, which was co-founded by John Jacob Astor, Arthur Tappan, and a handful of other powerful early Manhattan businessmen. Leavitt also served as director of several early New York City banking firms, including Bank of America.

Leavitt also served as president of the New York City Board of Trade in 1841 In 1836, the prominent New York businessman served on the executive committee of the American Temperance Society. Heavily involved in charitable work, Leavitt also served as a director of the New York Institution for the Instruction of the Deaf and Dumb. He also served on the boards of the Prison Discipline Society, the American Education Society, the New York Hospital Society, the Central American Education Society, the New York Temperance Society and other charitable organizations, and as an elder of the Fifth Avenue Presbyterian Church on Manhattan's Fifth Avenue. John Wheeler Leavitt also served with other prominent New York merchants and educators on the board of the New York Atheneum, an institution which eventually led to the founding of New York University, and was a founding trustee of the Clinton Hall Association. Leavitt and his brother Rufus also served as life members of the American Colonization Society, an attempt by early American abolitionists to subsidize a colony in Africa where America could export its free black citizens.

In 1836 and 1837, Leavitt served as a Director of the New York and Erie Railroad. Among the host of other companies Leavitt was involved with were the Utah Central Railroad Leavitt had become a fixture on the Manhattan economic scene, and his presence on committees was noted by early New York mayor Philip Hone. (Leavitt had been one of Hone's earliest and most prominent supporters in his successful mayoral candidacy). In 1837 Leavitt was member of a committee devoted to receiving Senator Daniel Webster in New York City following his resignation from the Senate.

Merchant Leavitt had reached the apogee of the Manhattan social whirl, with American furniture maker Duncan Phyfe producing furniture for the successful businessman. By 1850 New York newspapers were heralding the upcoming marriage of the daughter of the prosperous Connecticut-born merchant to the scion of a French-family-owned silk-manufacturing firm. In that year John Wheeler Leavitt's daughter Cecilia Kent Leavitt was married to "Mr Adolph Beaux of the house of J. P. Beaux & Co., Naples" in a society wedding at the Fifth Avenue Presbyterian Church.

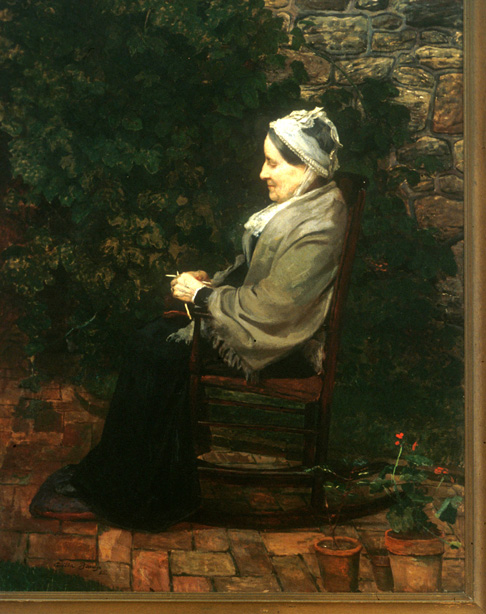
Mrs. John Wheeler Leavitt Grandmother of Philadelphia artist Cecilia Beaux, knitting, 1885

But the following years brought disaster to the socially prominent families of both Leavitt and Beaux. In 1855 John W. Leavitt's daughter Cecilia died 12 days after giving birth to her daughter Cecilia Beaux, who was then sent with a sister to grandparents John Wheeler and Cecilia (Kent) Leavitt's New York home. By the time of Cecilia Beaux's mother's death, Leavitt and his wife were living in austere circumstances, following the collapse of his once-thriving business. The origins of the collapse of Leavitt's business interests are not recorded, but the aftermath was stunning. Countless suits were filed against John Wheeler Leavitt and his brother Rufus by creditors anxious to reclaim what was left of their funds. Some of the suits, recorded in The New-York Legal Observer, even hinted at fraud as the once-highflying partnership of the two Leavitt brothers collapsed.

On top of the business reversals of the Leavitt family firm, Jean Adolph Beaux's business interests collapsed in the years following the birth of his daughter. The French businessman returned to his native country, with only one visit back to Philadelphia in 16 years to see the family he left behind.

But in spite of the collapse of the family firm, grandparents John Wheeler and Cecilia Kent Leavitt took in the two children, and proved instrumental in raising them through the years. Cecilia Beaux later painted her Suffield-born grandmother several times, and called her crucial to her development as an artist.

"Especially attached to her grandmother Cecilia Kent Leavitt", writes art historian Tara Tappert in her Cecilia Beaux and the Art of Portraiture, "Beaux regarded her as 'the strongest and most beneficent influence' in her life." In the wake of the devastation that struck the family, it was Cecilia Kent Leavitt who provided an emotional bulwark for her grandchildren. Beaux recalled later that her grandmother stressed a pragmatic approach to life, in which "everything undertaken must be completed, conquered". The unsettled years during the American Civil War were particularly difficult, as Beaux's absent father provided little emotional or financial support, and her Leavitt grandparents had lost much of their wealth and prominence.

For many years, portraitist Beaux and her cousin Emma Leavitt shared a Philadelphia studio, a bond encouraged by Beaux's Leavitt grandmother. The shared studio was not the only Leavitt bond that eased Cecilia Beaux's passage as an artist: her aunt Eliza Leavitt was her first painting teacher, and Philadelphia history painter and cousin Catherine Drinker contributed to the young Beaux's education.

John Wheeler Leavitt is buried within Vault 39 of New York Marble Cemetery, a resting place he purchased in 1830, when times were good. The cemetery, built on the northern edge of Manhattan's development, was a favored resting place for New York's leading professional and merchant families. Leavitt died in New York City on July 17, 1870, two weeks after his 80th birthday. His wife Cecilia, who proved so crucial in the development of her artist granddaughter, died on May 9, 1892.

John Wheeler Leavitt and his wife had eight children, five of them girls. Leavitt was the great-grandfather of Haverford College Professor Henry S. Drinker. John Wheeler Leavitt's youngest daughter Emily Austin Leavitt had married William Foster Biddle, a Philadelphia civil and mining engineer who proved adept at looking after his nieces. Leavitt's son John Wheeler Leavitt Jr. graduated from Columbia University in New York City in 1845. John Wheeler Leavitt Jr. was christened at Fifth Avenue Presbyterian Church in Manhattan in 1831. He later married Catherine Churchill, daughter of New York businessman William Churchill and his wife Cornelia. Catherine (Churchill) Leavitt is interred in the Leavitt family vault in New York Marble Cemetery.

== Quotes ==
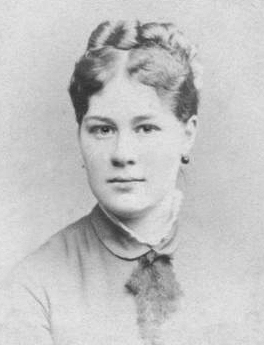
American portrait artist Cecilia Beaux, ca. 1888. Raised by grandfather John Wheeler Leavitt and wife Cecilia (Kent) Leavitt

My grandparents were both of Puritan New England stock, English entirely. Their ancestors had been early settlers in the northern and western part of Connecticut. My grandfather, John Wheeler Leavitt, came from the township of Washington; my grandmother, whose name was Cecilia Kent, from Suffield.

– American painter Cecilia Beaux, Background with Figures: Autobiography of Cecilia Beaux, Houghton Mifflin Company, 1930

== See also ==
- Cecilia Beaux
- David Leavitt
- New York Marble Cemetery
