= Colleen Broomall =

American actress

- Born: August 30, 1983 (age 43); Teaneck, New Jersey, United States
- Occupations: Actress, Writer

Colleen Broomall (born August 30, 1983, in Teaneck, New Jersey) is an American journalist and former child actor.

Colleen grew up in Norwood, New Jersey and was cast to play the role of Meg Ryan's daughter on the soap opera As the World Turns at the age of two months. During her time on the show, Colleen became the national spokesmodel for Good Lad of Philadelphia and even garnered a Soap Opera Digest Award Nomination for Best Child Actor. However, when Colleen was in second grade, her mother pulled her out of showbiz so that she could enjoy a normal childhood.

At age 12, she was published in The New York Times Magazine and spent the summer after her sophomore year of college working as associate editor of both Life Story and Movie Magic magazines. During her senior year at the University of Delaware, she studied under CNN news veteran Ralph Begleiter and appeared on the school's weekly Del-AWARE news program. Throughout college, she was a Contributing Editor at Tiger Beat magazine

Colleen graduated with honors from the University of Delaware with a B.A. in Communications and concentration in Mass Mediqqa. From 2012 to 2015, Colleen was Editor-in-Chief of Popstar! magazine. In the summer of 2015, she left the publication in order to create and develop YSBnow (You're So Beautiful Now), a digital platform that seeks to inspire and empower teens. Less than five months after its October launch, and with no PR or advertising, YSBnow was attracting 200,000 unique visitors a month.

In a 2019 podcast, Colleen revealed that losing both of her brothers at a young age (one died in a car accident and the other died by suicide) is a driving force behind her work with Gen Z.

== Filmography ==
- The Winning Season (2009)
- As the World Turns (unknown episodes, 1983-1988, 1991) .... Danielle Andropoulos
