= RV Hugh R. Sharp =

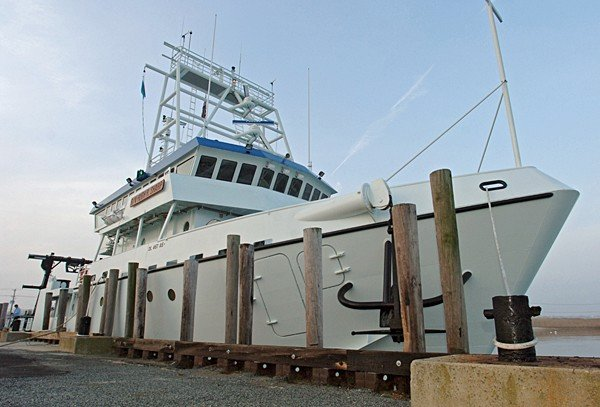
- Hugh R. Sharp, shown after delivery to UD Marine Operations in Lewes, Delaware

History

United States
- Namesake: Hugh R. Sharp
- Owner: University of Delaware Hugh R. Sharp Campus, University of Delaware College of Earth, Ocean, and Environment, Lewes, DE
- Builder: Dakota Creek Industries
- Acquired: December 2005
- Identification: IMO number: 9388443; MMSI number: 367063060; Callsign: WDC9608
- Status: Active

General characteristics
- Type: Research vessel
- Tonnage: 495 (International); 290 (domestic)
- Length: 150 ft (46 m) (LOA); 134 ft (41 m) (LWL)
- Beam: 32 ft (9.8 m)
- Draft: 8 ft 10 in (2.69 m) (light); 9 ft 8 in (2.95 m) (heavy)
- Installed power: 4 × Cummins KTA-19D
- Propulsion: 2 × Schottel SRP 330M Z-drives
- Speed: 11–12 kn (13–14 mph; 20–22 km/h)
- Range: 3,500 nmi (6,500 km; 4,000 mi) at 7 knots (13 km/h; 8.1 mph)
- Endurance: 21 days
- Crew: 8

RV Hugh R. Sharp is a research vessel owned and operated by the University of Delaware College of Earth, Ocean, and Environment in Lewes, Delaware operating as a member of the University-National Oceanographic Laboratory System (UNOLS). She is a replacement for Cape Henlopen.

At 150 feet (46 m) in length, Hugh R Sharp is a mid-sized research vessel designed for expeditions lasting up to 21 days. The ship spends most of her time working in the Mid-Atlantic coastal region. Hugh R Sharp was delivered to the University of Delaware in December 2005, and the first scientific voyage was undertaken in March 2006 after extensive shakedown cruises and equipment calibrations. She is operated by a crew of 8 and accommodates a scientific party of 22 for up to 21 days at sea.

One of the ship's unique capabilities is a hydraulically removable keel which can be dropped in transit to deploy sonar. Each transducer well is mounted with mission specific loadouts of sonar arrays, whether side scan, surface mapping or otherwise.

The ship was designed by Bay Marine, Inc. of Barrington, Rhode Island in cooperation with University of Delaware Marine Operations Director Matthew J. Hawkins. Hugh R Sharp was constructed by Dakota Creek Industries of Anacortes, Washington. The name of the ship is drawn from Hugh R. Sharp, an alumnus from the University of Delaware and longtime supporter of ocean research by the University of Delaware. His estate and the University of Delaware shared the cost of the vessel.

== Specifications ==
- Operating Area: Mid-Atlantic/Coastal
- Freeboard (aft deck): 5 feet (1.5 m)
- Total Permanent Berths (2-person staterooms): 22
- Crew (Including technician): 8
  - Scientific: 12
  - with Conference Room used as berth (4-person): 16
  - with accommodations van (4-person): 20
  - Maximum on "Day Trip": 30
- Acoustic Capabilities: Below ICES limits at 8 knots
- Stack Emissions: "Average"

== Gallery ==
One of Hugh R. Sharp's mates at her helm

Hugh R. Sharp underway for sunrise off the coast of Delaware/New Jersey

Hugh R. Sharp moored and secured with double lines for an imminent storm
