= New York Marble Cemetery =

Historic cemetery in Manhattan, New York

- U.S. National Register of Historic Places
- New York State Register of Historic Places
- New York City Landmark
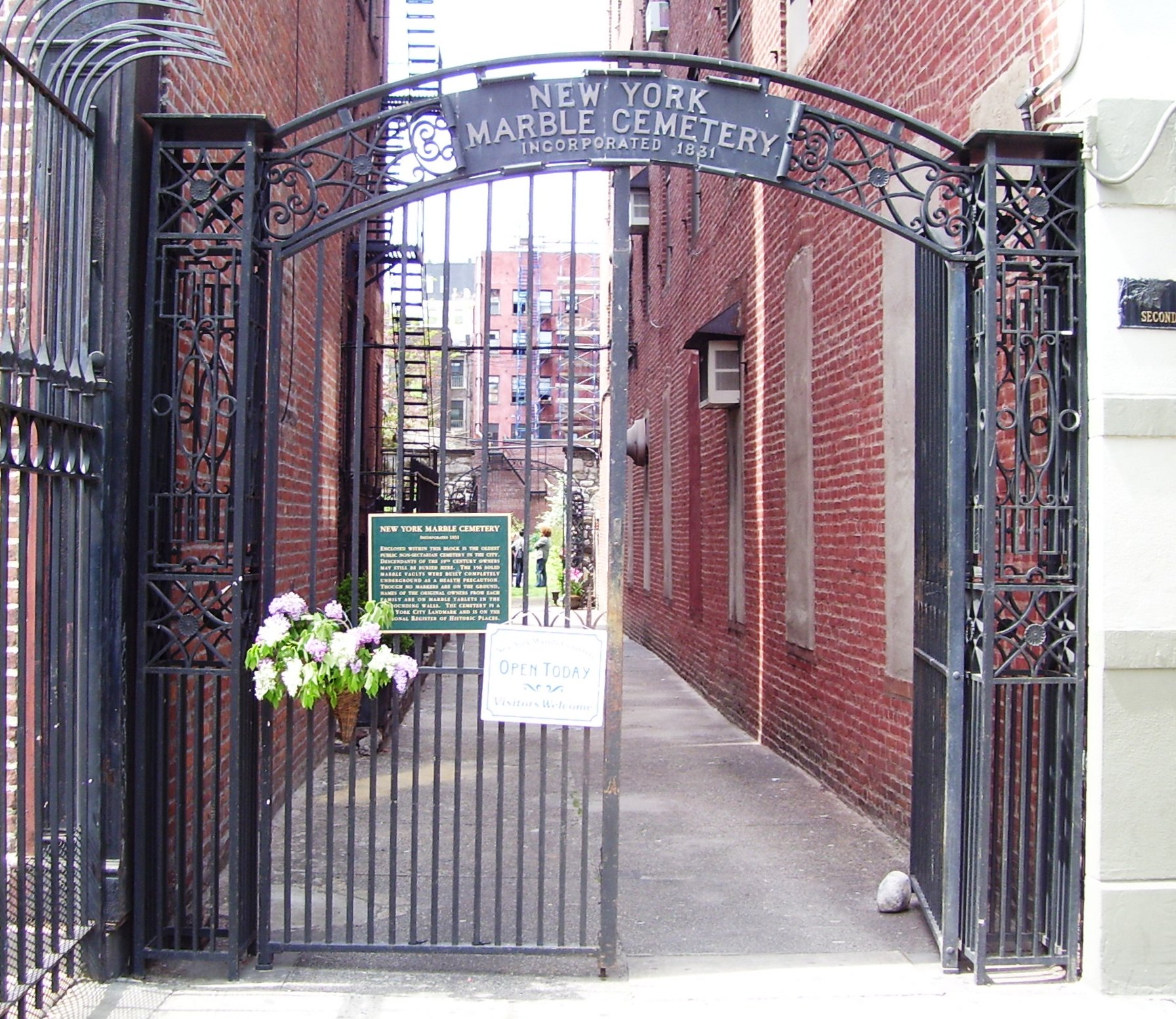
- The entrance gate on Second Avenue (2011)

- Location within New York City Location within New York Location within the United States
- Location: 41½ Second Avenue; Manhattan, New York City, US
- Coordinates: 40°43′32.3″N 73°59′27.5″W
- Area: 0.5 acres (0.20 ha)
- Built: 1830
- NRHP reference No.: 80004475
- NYSRHP No.: 06101.000558

Significant dates
- Added to NRHP: September 17, 1980
- Designated NYSRHP: June 23, 1980
- Designated NYCL: March 4, 1969

The New York Marble Cemetery is a burial ground established in 1830 in what is now the East Village of Manhattan, New York City, United States. It occupies the interior of the block bounded by 2nd Street, Second Avenue, 3rd Street, and the Bowery. It is entered through an alleyway with an iron gate at each end, located between 41 and 43 Second Avenue. About 2,100 burials are recorded in the cemetery's written registers, most from prominent professional and merchant families in New York City.

The New York Marble Cemetery, which was New York City's first non-sectarian burial place, should not be confused with the nearby New York City Marble Cemetery one block east, which is entirely separate, and was established one year later. Both cemeteries were designated New York City landmarks in 1969, and in 1980 both were added to the National Register of Historic Places.

== History and description ==
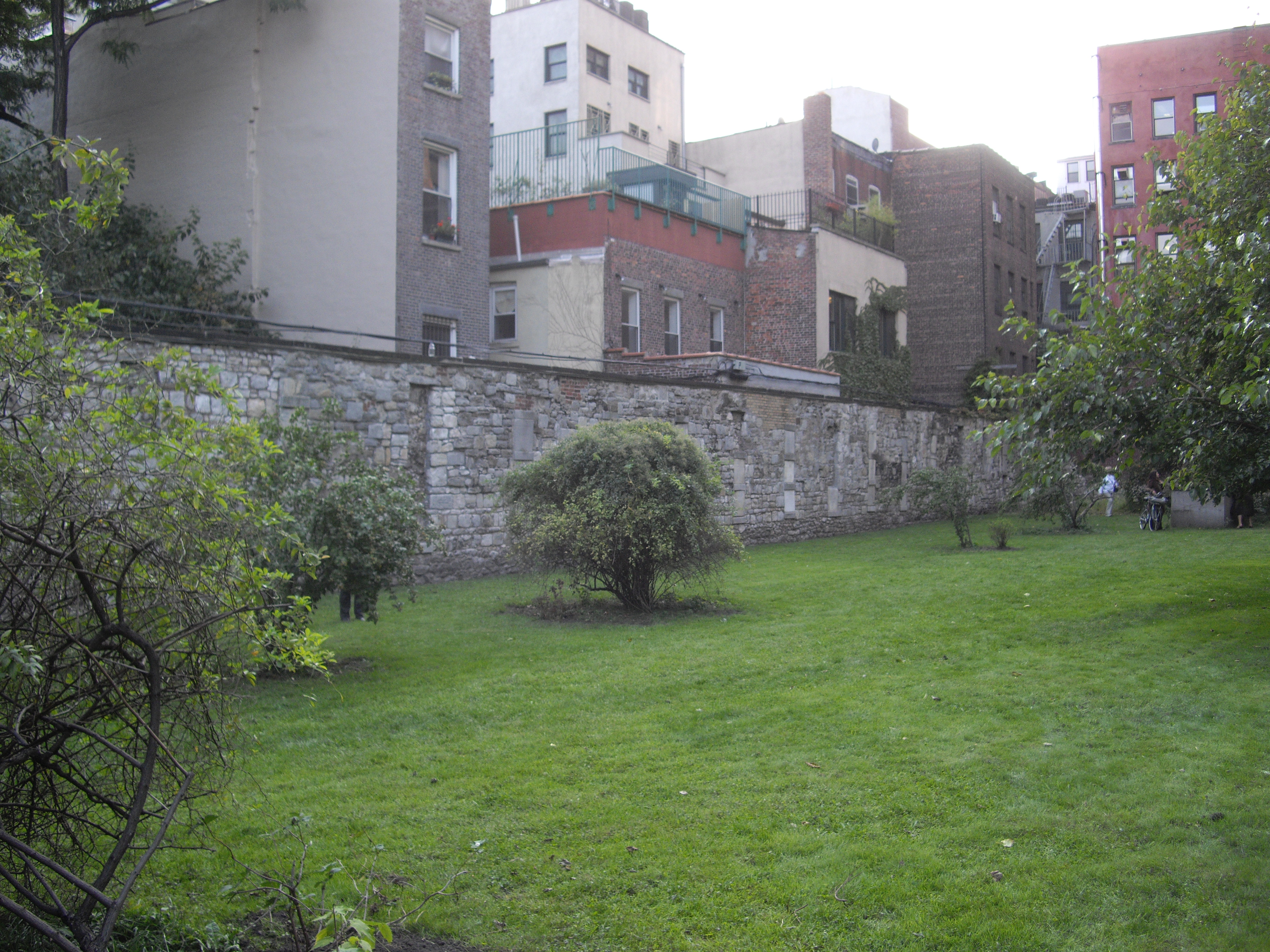
New York Marble Cemetery during 2008 Open House New York weekend

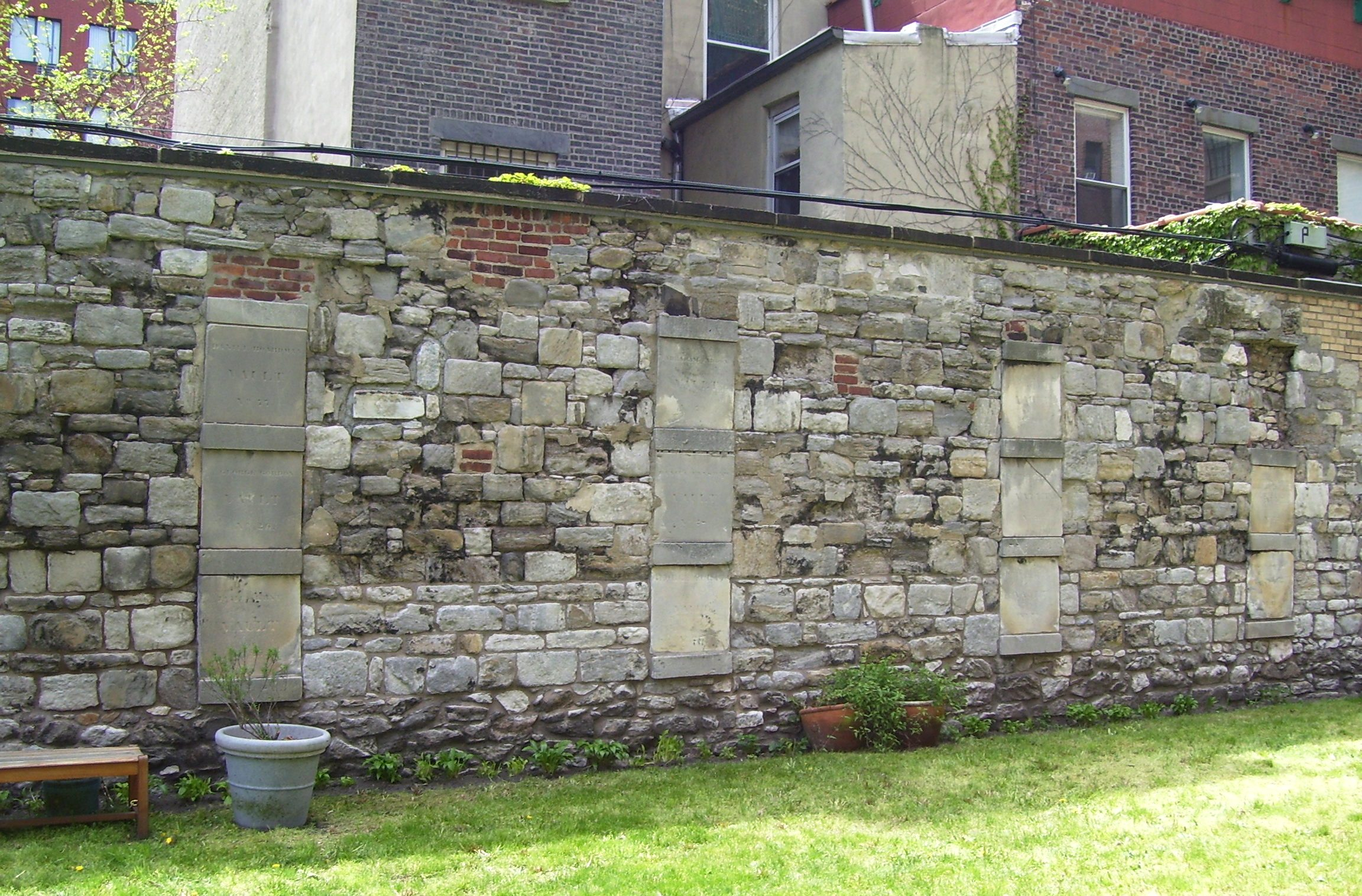
Part of the south wall, showing the embedded marble tablets

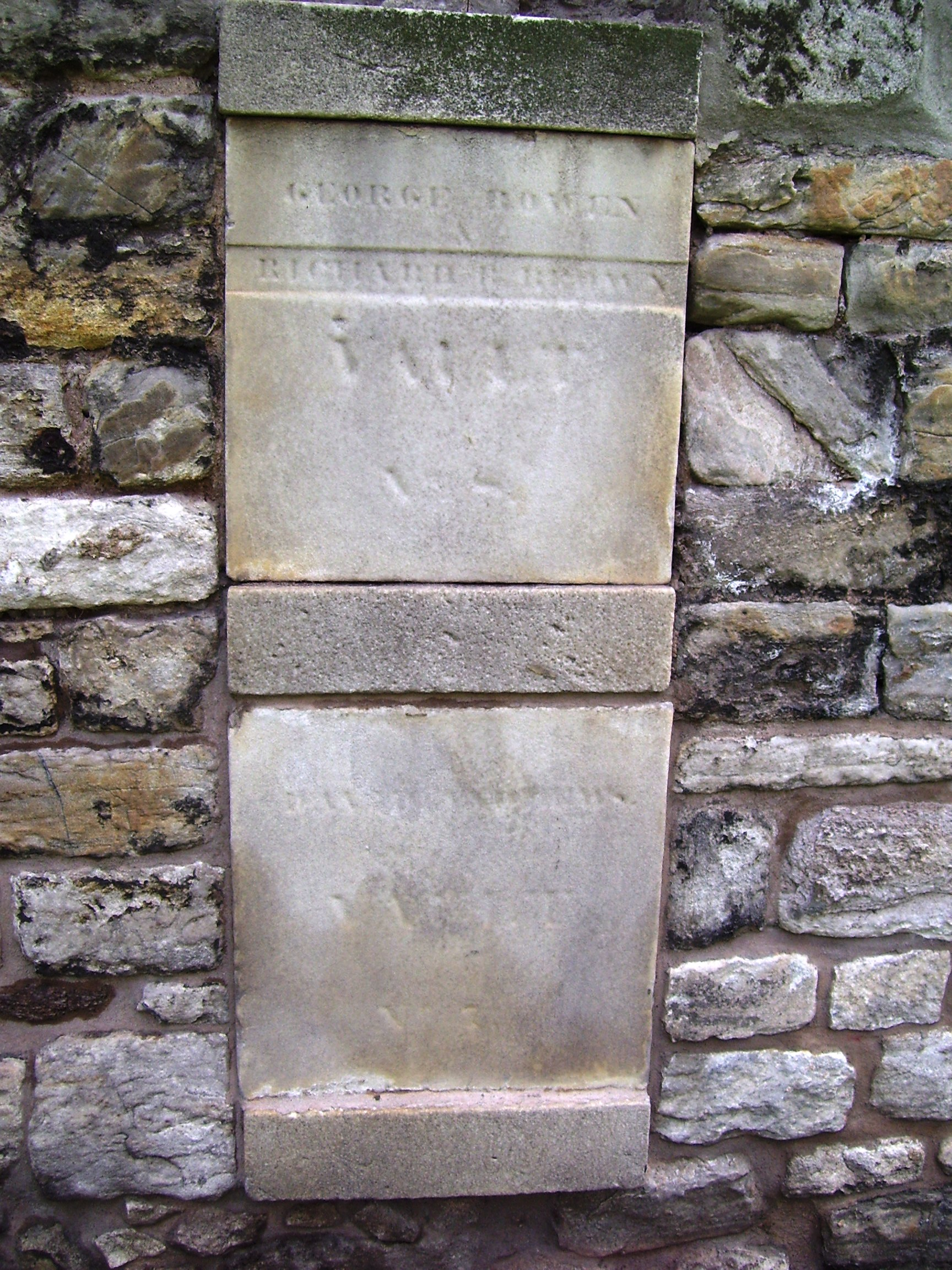
Close-up of two of the marble vault tablets

The cemetery was founded as a commercial undertaking of Perkins Nichols, who hired two lawyers, Anthony Dey and George W. Strong, to serve as organizing trustees. Recent outbreaks of yellow fever led city residents to fear burying their dead in coffins just a few feet below ground, and public health legislation had outlawed earthen burials. Nichols intended to appeal to this market by providing underground vaults for burial.

Dey and Strong purchased the property on Nichols's behalf, on what was then the northern edge of residential development, on July 13, 1830, and Nichols had the 156 underground family vaults, each the size of a small room, constructed from Tuckahoe marble and laid out in a grid of six columns by 26 rows. He was then reimbursed from the sale of the vaults.

Access to each pair of barrel vaults is by the removal of a stone slab set well below the grade of the lawn, which has no monuments or markers. Marble tablets mounted in the long north and south walls give the names of the original vault owners – though not the names of burials – and indicate the precise location of each corresponding underground vault. By 1997, parts of the North Wall had collapsed and other portions required steel buttresses. The weakened sections were dismantled and rebuilt to an eight-foot height and the buttresses removed as of November 2018.

Nichols, Dey & Strong, and the subscribers applied to the New York State Legislature for a special act of incorporation, and this was granted on February 4, 1831. According to a historical plaque on the cemetery's entrance gate "Descendants of the 19th century owners may still be buried here."

== Visiting ==
According to the cemetery's website, it is usually open on the fourth Sunday of the month from April to October, as well as on other weekends during the year. The cemetery grounds are available for rental for appropriate events.

== Notable burials ==
- Gurdon Buck, pioneer plastic surgeon
- Aaron Clark, Whig mayor of New York City from 1837 to 1839
- Theodore Gordon, angler and sage of the Neversink River
- Richard K. Haight, prominent merchant, international travel, spread understanding of ancient Egypt
- John Wheeler Leavitt, prominent merchant, grandfather of artist Cecilia Beaux
- Pierre Lorillard II, tobacco tycoon
- Stevens T. Mason, first governor of Michigan, later reinterred in Capitol Park, Detroit
- David Olyphant, a merchant involved in trade with China
- Luman Reed American art patron
- Uriah Scribner, merchant, and Charles Scribner, publisher, later reinterred at Woodlawn
- James Tallmadge Jr., Congressman (1817–19) and New York University Council President
- Benjamin Wright, Chief Engineer for the Erie Canal

Prominent New York uppertens families such as the Beeckmans, Hones, Hoyts, Quackenbushes, Varicks and Van Zandts have vaults in the cemetery.
