= Amanda Longacre =

American beauty pageant winner (born 1989)

- Born: October 22, 1989 (age 36); Bear, Delaware, United States
- Education: University of Delaware; University of Pennsylvania
- Known for: Winner, Miss Delaware 2014 (later stripped of title)

Amanda Mae Longacre (born October 22, 1989) is an American beauty pageant winner who was later stripped of her title due to her age.

== Education and career ==
=== Competition ===
A resident of Bear, Delaware, she was crowned as Miss Delaware 2014 on June 14, 2014, and prepared to compete in Miss America 2015. However, on June 27, 2014, she was stripped of the title because she would turn 25 in October. The title was given to the runner-up, Brittany Lewis. According to news outlets, "officials said Longacre was ineligible under Miss America rules because she will turn 25 in October, and Miss America rules require that contestants in the current year must still be 24 on Dec. 31". Longacre filed a $3 million lawsuit that asked for her to be reinstated as Miss Delaware and be allowed to compete in the Miss America pageant. She also asked to be reimbursed for financial losses related to this decision. Media outlets further reported that, "officials with the national Miss America organization confirmed to ABC News ... that they plan to fight Longacre's lawsuit but will still give her the full $9,000 in scholarship money they pledged to her after she was disqualified ... Miss America officials last month blamed the error on state pageant officials who, they said, missed the age discrepancy in Longacre’s submitted paperwork".

According to the official Miss America website, contestants must be:

- "Be between the ages of 17 and 24.
- Be a United States citizen.
- Meet residency requirements for competing in a certain town or state.
- Meet character criteria as set forth by the Miss America Organization.
- Be in reasonably good health to meet the job requirements.
- Be able to meet the time commitment and job responsibilities as set forth by the local program in which you compete."

=== Education ===
Longacre is a graduate of the University of Delaware. She majored in history and women's studies with a concentration in Domestic Violence Prevention and Services. She had suspended her studies toward a Master of Social Work degree at the University of Pennsylvania to compete in the pageant. She has since graduated as of May 2015.

== See also ==
- List of University of Delaware people
- List of University of Pennsylvania people
