= The Hill School =

Private, preparatory boarding school in Pottstown, Pennsylvania, United States

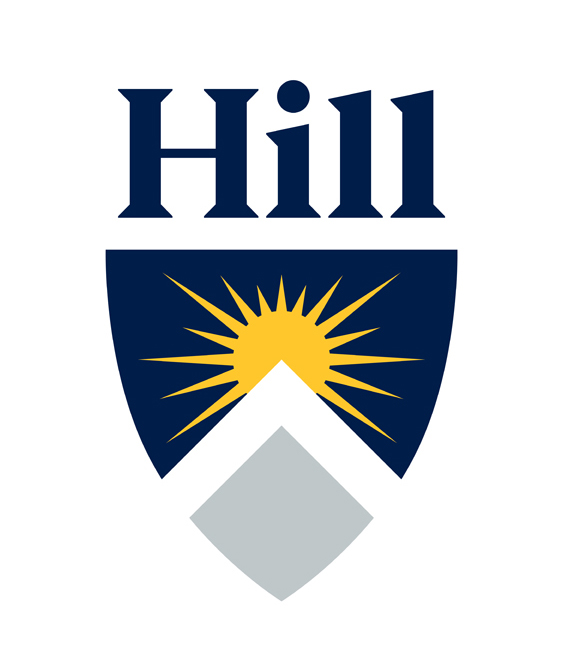

Location
- 860 Beech St; Pottstown, PA 19464; USA; 40.2449°N 75.6331°W

Information
- Former name: The Family Boarding School for Boys and Young Men (1851–74)
- Type: Private; day; boarding; college-preparatory school
- Motto: Whatsoever things are true (Philippians 4:8)
- Religious affiliation: Nonsectarian
- Established: 1851; 175 years ago
- Founder: Matthew Meigs
- Status: Currently operational
- CEEB code: 394080
- NCES School ID: A0902935
- Chair: James L. Alexandre '75
- Head of school: Kathleen Devaney
- Faculty: 74.1 (FTE)
- Grades: 9-12, PG
- Gender: Coeducational
- Enrollment: 529 (2019–20)
  - Grade 9: 108
  - Grade 10: 126
  - Grade 11: 142
  - Grade 12: 153
- Average class size: 10
- Student to teacher ratio: 7.1
- Hours in school day: 7.1
- Campus size: 200 acres (81 ha)
- Campus type: Suburban
- Colors: Gray & Blue
- Song: "A Thousand Hands"
- Fight song: "Dear Old Hill"
- Athletics conference: MAPL; NEPSAC
- Sports: 31
- Mascot: Ram
- Nickname: Rams
- Rival: The Lawrenceville School
- Accreditation: MSA
- Endowment: $163 million
- Annual tuition: $78,300 (boarding) $53,380 (day)
- Revenue: $57 million
- Affiliation: Ten Schools Admission Organization
- Website: www.thehill.org

The Hill School is a four-year private, coeducational, preparatory boarding school located on a 200-acre (81 ha) campus in Pottstown, Pennsylvania, about 35 miles (56 km) northwest of Philadelphia. The Hill is part of the Ten Schools Admission Organization.

The school is accredited by the Middle States Association of Colleges and Schools Commission on Elementary and Secondary Schools.

== Academics ==
The Hill School is ranked as one of the top high schools in Pennsylvania and top boarding schools nationally.

=== Distinctive programs ===
The Hill School is best known for its programs in the Humanities, Classics, and liberal arts. In 1946, Paul Chancellor introduced one of the first Humanities programs in secondary education. The school also boasts a robust STEMD program through the Shirley Quadrivium Center, named after Jon Shirley, former Microsoft President and alumnus of the Class of 1956, who gave a significant gift to fund its design and construction.

=== Partner schools ===
The Hill School has cooperated with Charterhouse School in the United Kingdom since 1994; they organize instructional trips and exchanges of extracurricular programs and teachers. It is linked with the Maru a Pula School in Botswana. As well, the Hill hosts a Thai King's Scholar every year. The Hill School is a participating school in the Naval Academy Foundation Prep Program.

== Athletics ==
The Hill School is a member of the Mid-Atlantic Prep League (MAPL), which the School joined in 1998. The Hill School was a charter member of the Pennsylvania Independent Schools Athletic Association (PAISAA), which became an officially sanctioned organization in 2011. In 2014, The Hill School received associate membership in the New England Preparatory School Athletic Council (NEPSAC).

The Hill School's rivalry with Lawrenceville dates back to 1887. It is the fifth-oldest high school rivalry in the United States. Originally an annual football game, the schools compete against each other in all of the fall sports on either the first or second weekend in November.

Peddie School also maintains a "Hill Day" during which several teams from Hill and Peddie compete.

== Culture ==
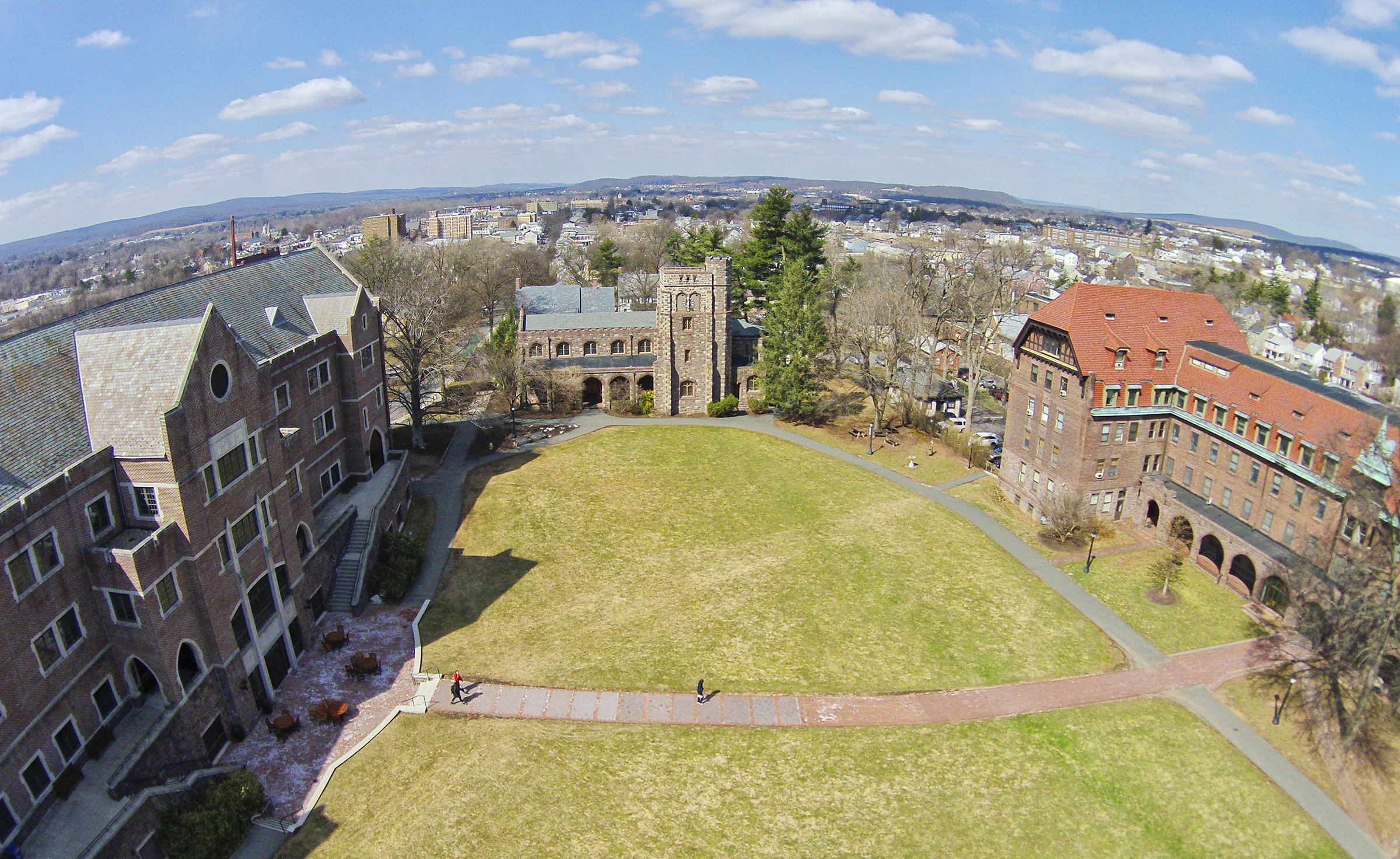
The Quad, facing west

Since its founding, The Hill School has been described as different in style and spirit from its counterparts in New England: "The Hill School's aim was to serve not the genteel Eastern seaboard but the industrial towns of Pennsylvania; not the sons of Wall Street, but the sons of anthracite barons and coke-oven princes. Instead of being snooty it endeavored to be stern and academically sound."

The Hill School typically enrolls 530 students per year, making it a medium-sized boarding school. Students describe each other as friendly, well-rounded, involved, hardworking, and determined.

=== Traditions ===
The Hill School maintains notable traditions that contribute to its culture:

- Academic Dress Code: students to wear blazers and ties or their equivalents daily to class.
- Seated Meals: students and faculty gather for seated lunch on each day of the school week and often for seated dinners.
- Chapel Talks: students and faculty share stories about their experiences.
- L'Ville Weekend: all sports teams from The Hill School and its rival The Lawrenceville School compete during one weekend each fall to celebrate the fifth-oldest high school rivalry in the United States.
- J-Ball: or Javelin Ball, a modified form of baseball played with tennis balls and racquets, that students play throughout campus each spring.

=== Past culture ===
In the past, The Hill School has been described as conservative, strict, and demanding. Alumnus Oliver Stone described his experience at The Hill School: "I hated the Hill School at the time. It was monastic. Horrible food, no girls. It was truly one of those Charles Dickens' types of experiences. And I really hated it. Years later I came to appreciate it." The Hill has been criticized, alongside other East Coast Protestant schools, for promoting "snobbish", undemocratic, and "un-American values."

E. Digby Baltzell's book The Protestant Establishment identified the Hill School as one of the "select sixteen" boarding schools in the United States.

== History ==
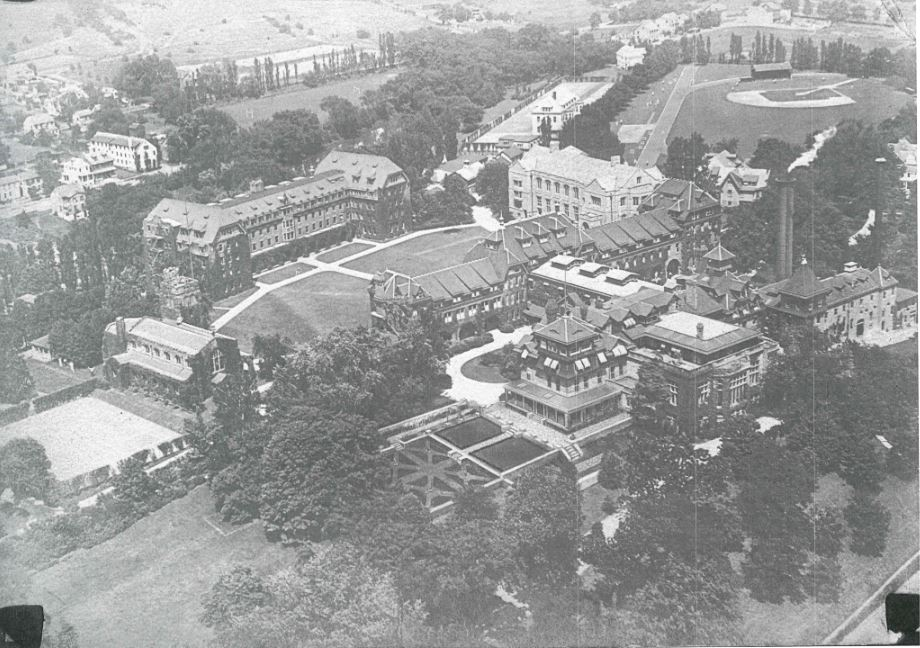
The Hill School campus, facing northeast

The Hill School was founded in 1851 by the Rev. Matthew Meigs as The Family Boarding School for Boys and Young Men. It opened on May 1, 1851, enrolling 25 boys for the first year. It was a new type of boarding school, namely a "family boarding school" with students housed on campus, not boarding with families in the town. Since 1874, it has been known as The Hill School.

In the early days of the school, boys played shinney, town ball, football and cricket. During John Meigs' tenure as headmaster, organized and interscholastic sports began at The Hill. Tennis became the dominant sport during this period, unlike baseball at other schools.

In the early 20th century, The Hill was a feeder school for Princeton University; The Hill School Club was active at Princeton for the benefit of Hill alumni. Princeton's admissions standards were relaxed for Hill School students. At one point, Lawrenceville and Hill sent more students to Princeton than all public schools combined. Today, Hill alumni attend a wide variety of colleges.

In 1998, the school became coeducational, enrolling 88 girls in its first year.

== Heads of school ==
Heads of school for The Hill School since its founding in 1851:

Name	Tenure	Education	Notes
Matthew Meigs	1851–1876	Union College, Union Theological Seminary	Presbyterian minister and former President of Delaware College.
John Meigs	1876–1911	Hill, Lafayette College	Took over as headmaster at age 24.
Alfred G. Rolfe	1911–1914		
Dwight R. Meigs	1914–1922		Son of John Meigs, who created the current dining room, described by the school as "a pivotal gathering space on The Hill School’s campus."
Dr. Boyd Edwards	1922–1928		
James Wendell	1928–1952	Wesleyan	Olympic silver medalist in 110 m hurdles
Edward (Ned) T. Hall	1952–1968		Also served as ice hockey coach
Archibald R. Montgomery	1968–1973	Westminster, Penn	Left to become headmaster of St. Stephen's Episcopal School. Former United States Marine.
Charles C. Watson	1973–1993		Former U.S Navy officer
David R. Dougherty	1993–2012	Episcopal High School, Washington and Lee University	Oversaw shift to co-ed school
Zachary G. Lehman	2012–2022	Phillips Exeter Academy, Dartmouth College, Harvard Law School	
Kathleen Devaney	2023–Present	Bowdoin College, Dartmouth College	First female head of school
