= Richard Sharpe Mason =

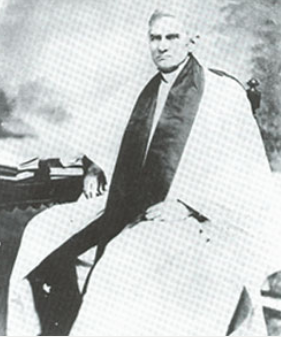

President of the University of Delaware
- In office October 9, 1835 – October 12, 1840
- Preceded by: Eliphalet Wheeler Gilbert
- Succeeded by: Eliphalet Wheeler Gilbert

President of Hobart College
- In office 1828 – October 9, 1835
- Preceded by: Jasper Adams
- Succeeded by: Benjamin Hale

Personal details
- Born: December 29, 1795 Barbados
- Died: February 21, 1874 (aged 78) Raleigh, North Carolina, U.S.
- Education: University of Pennsylvania

Richard Sharpe Mason (December 29, 1795 – February 21, 1874) was an American Episcopal clergyman. He served as the president of Geneva College (now Hobart College) from 1828 to 1835 and of Delaware College (now University of Delaware) from 1835 to 1840.

== Biography ==
Mason was born on December 29, 1795, in Barbados, and moved to United States at a young age. He attended the University of Pennsylvania, from which he graduated in 1812. He was ordained deacon in the Episcopal Church in Philadelphia on September 21, 1817.

Mason became rector of the Christ Church in New Bern, North Carolina, during 1918. He was ordained priest in the Episcopal Protestant Church on April 30, 1820, by Right Reverend Richard Channing Moore at St. Paul's Church in Edenton, North Carolina.

On June 10, 1823, Mason married Mary Ann Bryan, with whom he had six children.

Mason transferred to the Diocese of Pennsylvania in 1828, and the same year was named rector of St. Matthew's Church at Geneva, New York. He was also appointed president of Geneva College (now Hobart College), succeeding Jasper Adams, that year. In 1834, a medical school was established in connection with the college, which "obtained high rank in its day," and had several physicians of note in its faculty.

Mason left Geneva in 1835, after being elected president of Delaware College (now University of Delaware). He served five years in that position, but was faulted by critics for lax administration, leading to his resignation on October 12, 1840.

Mason returned to North Carolina in 1840, becoming rector of the Christ Church. He lived there for the rest of his life. At North Carolina, he engaged in "extensive missionary work," helping to enlarge church support and membership.

Mason died on February 21, 1874, in Raleigh. He was 78 at the time of his death. His funeral was held at Christ Church on February 24.

An entry of Mason from the Dictionary of North Carolina Biography wrote that "Although comparatively young, Mason is said to have been quite absentminded. Once in planting vegetables in his garden, he put the peas in his pocket and his spectacles in the ground."
