= Matthew Meigs =

American educator, scholar and Presbyterian clergyman

The Reverend Dr. Matthew Meigs
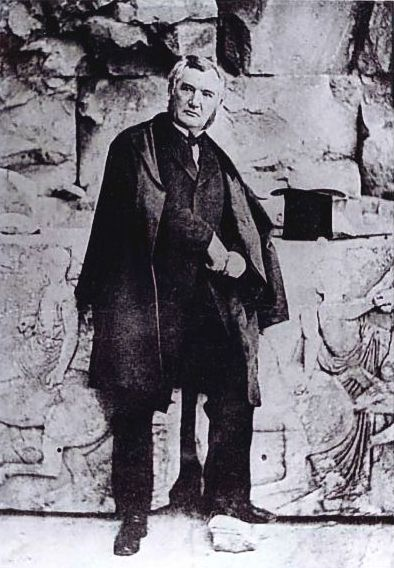
- Born: Matthew Kugler (Kughler) Meigs; February 5, 1812; Albany, New York
- Died: October 9, 1889 (aged 77); Clifton Springs, New York
- Resting place: Edgewood Cemetery, Pottstown, Pennsylvania
- Education: Union College; Union Theological Seminary
- Occupations: Educator; Clergyman
- Known for: Principal, Academy of Newark, 1846-1851; President, Delaware College 1850-1851; Founder and Principal of The Hill School, 1851-1876; United States Consul to Piraeus, Greece, 1868-1869
- Spouse: Mary Ripley Moulton Gould
- Children: Eleven
- Parents: Major John Meigs (father); Hannah Kugler Meigs (mother)

Matthew Kugler Meigs (February 5, 1812 – October 9, 1889) was an American educator, scholar, and Presbyterian clergyman. Although best known as the founder and principal (headmaster) of The Hill School in Pottstown, Pennsylvania, Meigs also served a short term as U.S. Consul to Piraeus, Greece, pastored churches, and preceded his time at The Hill School with teaching posts at a variety of other secondary and university level institutions including a short term as President of Delaware College (subsequently the University of Delaware).

== Life ==
Meigs was born in Albany, New York, on February 5, 1812. He was the son of Major John Meigs and grandson of Seth Meigs, a Revolutionary War soldier. He married Mary Gould on April 11, 1842. Eleven children were born to them between 1844 and 1858. Son John succeeded his father as The Hill School's headmaster, serving in that position from 1876 to 1911.

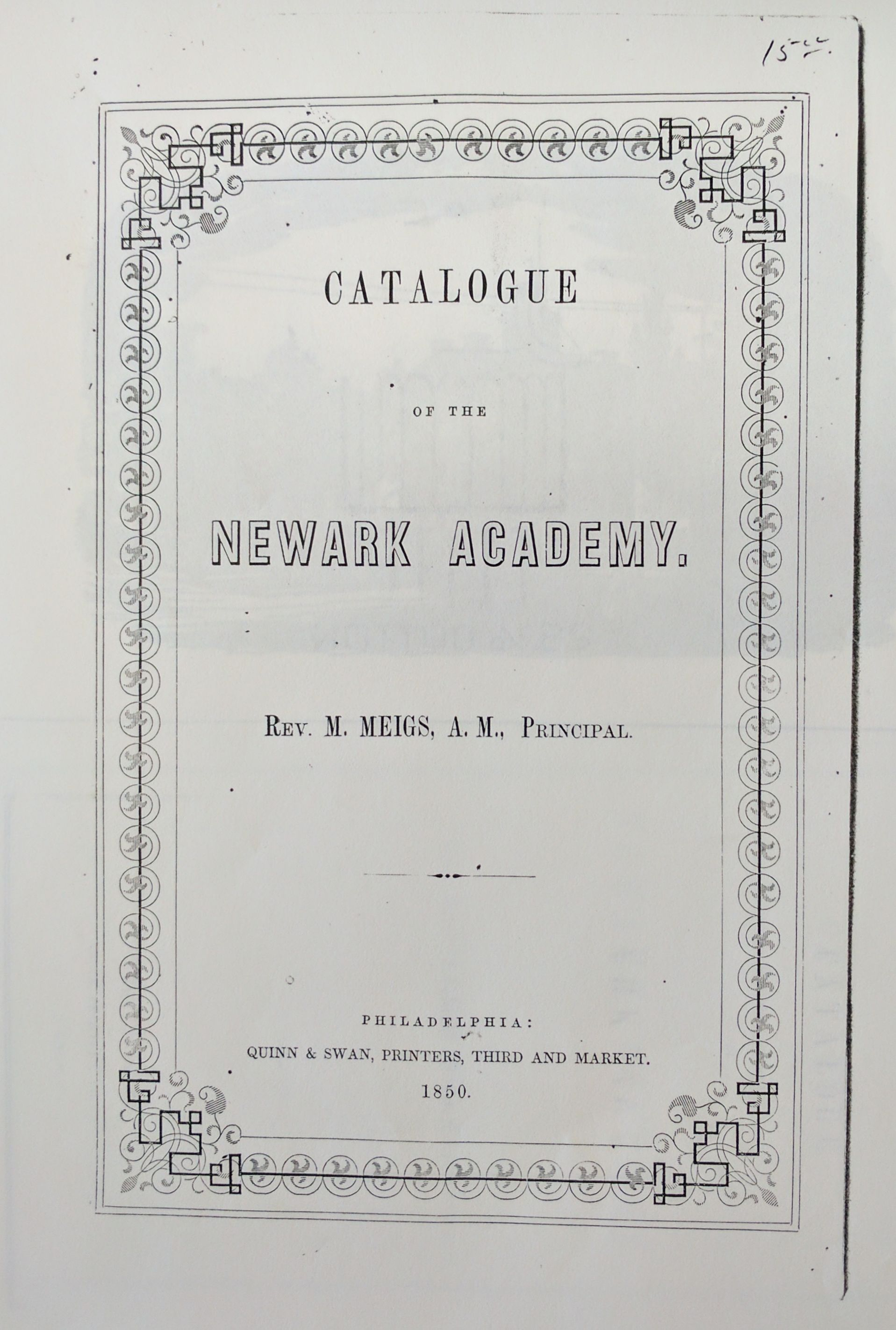
1850 Newark Academy Catalogue cover

== Academic studies and early career ==
Meigs received his undergraduate degree in languages and linguistics from Union College (1836) and theological training from Union Theological Seminary (1839) after which he was ordained a Presbyterian Minister. Other degrees followed including a Ph.D. from Lafayette College. Various alumni journals, histories and obituaries concur that he was at some point also awarded the degrees of D.D. (Doctor of Divinity) and L.L.D. (Doctor of Laws). Union College specifically attributes the L.L.D. to Lafayette College in 1868.

Meigs early academic career included posts at schools in South Carolina, Winchester, Virginia, and the University of Michigan. He then became a teacher and principal of Newark Academy (1846-1851) before becoming president of Delaware College (1850-1851). During his time in Michigan, he also pastored a church in Pontiac.

== The Hill School and later career ==
Meigs' most notable legacy is in the founding of The Hill School in 1851 in Pottstown, Pennsylvania from which he retired as principal in 1876. During his tenure at The Hill, he took a brief leave of absence from 1868-1869 to serve as U.S. Consul to Piraeus, Greece.

Meigs continued his interest in the church even after education became his primary professional focus. He and his family were active at the First Presbyterian Church in Pottstown. His obituaries attest to the respect accorded both his clerical standing in the church and his status as a scholar by describing him as a "well-known Presbyterian divine" and a "distinguished scholar and clergyman...a man of fine literary attainments, distinguished as a philologist" at the time of his death.

== Death ==
Meigs died on October 9, 1889, in Clifton Springs, New York, and was buried in Edgewood Cemetery in Pottstown. The New York State death certificate (#36123) and local obituaries agree on October 9 as his death date. However, the Journal of the Presbyterian Historical Society, The University of Delaware Archives, and The Union Theological Seminary Alumni Catalog give October 10 as date of death.
