= William Wascher =

American economist

Academic background
- Education: University of Delaware, University of Pennsylvania

Academic work
- Discipline: Labor economics
- Institutions: Federal Reserve Board of Governors
- Website: Information at IDEAS / RePEc

William Louis Wascher is an American economist and the deputy director of the Division of Research and Statistics in the Federal Reserve Board of Governors.

== Education ==
Wascher graduated with a B.A. in economics and mathematics from the University of Delaware in 1978. He went on to complete his M.A. in 1980 and Ph.D. in 1983 in economics from the University of Pennsylvania.

== Professional career ==
Wascher has been with the Federal Reserve Board of Governors since 1983. In addition, he was a visiting economist with the Bank for International Settlements from 1998 to 1999 and served as a senior staff economist on the Council of Economic Advisers during the administration of George H. W. Bush.

== Research ==
Wascher is known for his research on the economic effects of the minimum wage and aggregate supply, and is the co-author (with David Neumark) of the 2008 book Minimum Wages (MIT Press). Wascher and Neumark have also collaborated on multiple peer-reviewed studies on the employment effects of the minimum wage.
