= Chris Collins (lacrosse) =

American lacrosse player (born 1982)

Personal information
- Nickname: CC71
- Nationality: American
- Born: April 12, 1982 (age 44) New York City, New York, U.S.
- Height: 5 ft 11 in (180 cm)
- Weight: 185 lb (84 kg; 13 st 3 lb)

Sport
- Position: Goalie
- NLL team Former teams: New England Black Wolves; New York Titans / Philadelphia Wings
- MLL team Former teams: Baltimore Bayhawks / Washington Bayhawks / Philadelphia Barrage / Chicago Machine
- NCAA team: University of Delaware Men's Lacrosse
- Pro career: 2006–

Chris Collins (born April 12, 1982) is an American-born professional lacrosse player of the NLL, MLL and a member of TEAM USA

== College career ==
Chris Collins earned United States Intercollegiate Lacrosse Association honorable mention All American honors in 2005 after leading the nationally ranked Blue Hens to an 11–6 record, the Colonial Athletic Association regular season title, and a berth in the NCAA Tournament.

The Hens, who placed second in the CAA Tournament, made just their third NCAA Tournament appearance in school history before falling to No. 5 seed Navy 9–7 in the opening round.

Collins became the first University of Delaware Goaltender to earn All-American honors since Jim Pappas was an honorable mention pick in 1962. Collins, who earned second team All-CAA honors each of his last two seasons, was a three-year captain, a three-year starter in net for the Hens, and was named the team's Most Valuable Player in 2005. He also earned the team's Sportsmanship Award and played in the annual USILA North-South Senior All-Star game.

He started all 17 games in 2005, posting a 7.56 goals against average and a .584 save percentage. He set school records for minutes played in a season (1,009:18), goals against average in a season (7.56), and goals against average in career (8.64), and ranks No. 4 all-time at Delaware with 554 saves.

== Professional career ==
=== Major League Lacrosse ===
Career, 2005–2012

- 2012: retired as a member of the Boston Cannons prior to the 2012 season
- 2010: goaltender for the Chicago Machine
- 2010: traded to the Chicago Machine on the day of the Roster Deadline
- 2009: played three games as goaltender for the Washington Bayhawks
- 2008: played six games as goaltender for the Washington Bayhawks, recording a goals against average of 12.89 and making 19 saves in 102:26 minutes of play, and earning a record of 1–1 as a starting goaltender.
- 2007: played three games as a goaltender for the Washington Bayhawks, recording a goals against average of 25.63 and making 6 saves.
- 2006: dressed for the first two games of the season for the Baltimore Bayhawks (Week 1 @ Long Island & Week 2 @ Chicago) as backup goaltender to Scott Schroeder, and then spent the rest of the year on the practice squad.

=== National Lacrosse League ===
- 2019: signed to the Philadelphia Wings Roster
- 2018: signed to the Expansion Philadelphia Wings Roster
- 2015: signed to the New England Black Wolves Roster
- 2014: signed to the Philadelphia Wings Roster
- 2013: signed to the Philadelphia Wings Roster
- 2012: signed to the Philadelphia Wings Roster
- 2009: signed to the Philadelphia Wings Practice Squad
- 2008: signed to the New York Titans Practice Squad
- 2007: signed to the New York Titans Practice Squad

=== Western Lacrosse Association ===
- 2018: member of the Langley Thunder (SrA)

=== Team USA ===
In August 2015 Collins was selected to play for the US Men's Indoor National Team in the Federation of International Lacrosse World Indoor Championship. Team USA won a bronze medal, beating Israel 15–4.

- 2015: World Indoor Lacrosse Championships / Onondaga Nation/Syracuse

=== United States Indoor Lacrosse Developmental Team ===
- 2007–2012: goaltender

=== Quebec Senior Lacrosse League ===
- 2010: Vermont Voyageurs (SrB)
- 2011: Vermont Voyageurs (SrB)
- 2013: Vermont Voyageurs (SrB)

=== Professional Lacrosse League ===
- 2012: Reading Rockets

=== Premier Lacrosse League ===
- 2020: Redwoods Lacrosse Club - defensive coordinator and goaltending coach

== Post-collegiate career ==
During on-line voting for the 60th Anniversary All-Time Delaware Team in 2008, Collins was the top vote-getter among goalkeepers to earn a spot on the University of Delaware's first team.

The Colonial Athletic Association on January 14, 2010 named Collins to their Men's Lacrosse Silver (25th) Anniversary Team.

== Personal ==
Collins is an American born professional lacrosse player of the NLL, MLL, and a member of Team USA. The goaltender is from the Hudson Valley town of Yorktown, New York.

His opportunity to wear his nation's colors came in September 2015. Collins was a member of Team USA's Bronze Medal Team in the World Indoor Lacrosse Championships hosted by the Onondaga Nation and Syracuse University. Collins recorded the highest save percentage in the tournament, with a 94% save percentage.

Collins' professional career began with having played five seasons with the Baltimore/Washington Bayhawks of Major League Lacrosse. He then spent the 2010 MLL season with the Chicago Machine and retired from the MLL as a member of the Boston Cannons prior to the 2012 season. The National Lacrosse League has been a staple of Collins' professional career, and he is still active as a member of the expansion Philadelphia Wings, rounding out the goaltending unit of Zach Higgins and Brandon Miller. Collins has spent over a decade as member of teams including the New York Titans, where he backed up Matt Vinc and Erik Miller, the Philadelphia Wings in 2012, 2013 and 2014 as backup to Brandon Miller, and the New England Black Wolves as backup to Evan Kirk and Tye Belanger. Collins has made appearances in the Canadian Lacrosse Associations summer scene in the Quebec Senior Lacrosse League as a member of Vermont Voyageurs, and the US minor system with Professional Lacrosse League's Reading Rockets.

Collins is a University of Delaware alumnus, finishing his playing career in 2005. He was named an Honorable Mention All-America as a senior, when he led the Blue Hens to an 11–6 record, the CAA regular-season championship and a berth in the NCAA Tournament. A three-year starter and captain, Collins was twice named to the All-CAA Team. He set school records for single-season (7.56) and career goals against average (8.64) and is fourth all time at Delaware with 554 saves. Collins, who won the team's Most Valuable Player Award in 2005, appeared in the USILA North-South Senior All-Star game after his senior season, was named to the University of Delaware's 60th Anniversary Team as well as the CAA 25th Anniversary Team.

Collins' high school career concluded in June 2000 as a US Lacrosse Boy's High School All-American, and a 2-time Empire State Game Player.

== Stats ==
Season	Team	GP	Min	GA	GAA	S	Pct
2002	Delaware	N/A	N/A	N/A	N/A	N/A	N/A
2003	Delaware	15	894	144	9.67	190	.569
2004	Delaware	16	935	134	8.60	174	.565
2005	Delaware	17	1008	127	7.56	178	.584
Totals		48	2837	405	8.44	542	.573
