= Bahira Trask =

American anthropologist

Bahira S. Trask
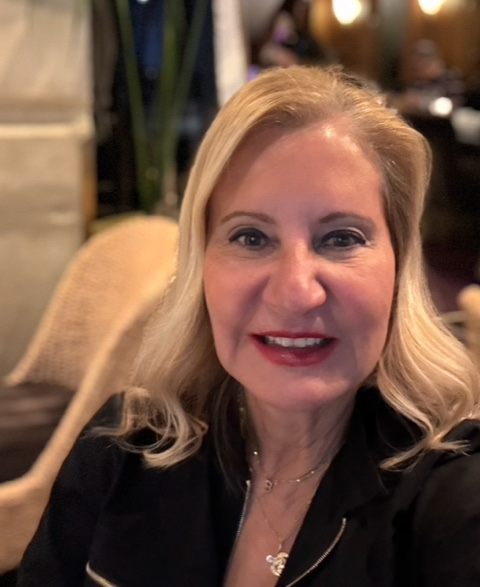
- Occupations: Anthropologist, academic and author

Academic background
- Education: BA in Political Science; PhD in Anthropology
- Alma mater: Yale University; University of Pennsylvania

Bahira S. Trask is an American anthropologist, academic, and author. She is a Professor and the former Chair of the Department of Human Development and Family Sciences at the University of Delaware (UD).

Trask's research focuses on globalization, women's employment, and family dynamics in Western and non-Western countries. She has authored and edited multiple books including Women, Work, and Globalization: Challenges and Opportunities, Globalization and Families: Accelerated Systemic Social Change, and Cultural Diversity and Families. She has been elected as a fellow to NCFR, and is the recipient of the UD Excellence in Teaching Award, the Jan Trost Award from NCFR and the Groves Feldman Award from the Groves Conference on Marriage and Families.

Trask has held a guest editorship of the Family and Consumer Sciences Research Journal.

== Education ==
Trask completed her B.A. in Political Science with a concentration in International Relations from Yale University and a Ph.D. in Cultural Anthropology from the University of Pennsylvania.

== Career ==
Beginning in 1995, Trask served as an adjunct Lecturer at the University of Pennsylvania before transitioning to a position as an assistant professor from 1997 to 2002, holding a joint appointment in the Department of Individual and Family Studies and the Center for Community Research and Service at the University of Delaware. She then assumed the role of associate professor in 2002, maintaining her joint appointment at the UD. In 2007, she became a Professor with a joint appointment within the same department and institute, later serving as Professor and Associate Chair/Graduate Coordinator until 2015. From 2015 to 2023, she held the position of Professor and Chair of the Department of Human Development and Family Sciences at the University of Delaware.

Trask has been engaged with the United Nations, contributing to various expert group meetings, panels and conferences focused on family dynamics, migration, urbanization, and human rights-based policies.

She has given two keynote addresses on the International Day of Families in 2018 and 2022. She has also spoken at United Nations expert group meetings and other United Nations international conferences, and served as a keynote speaker at the 9th Biennial International Conference of the UNESCO Child and Family Research Centre in Galway, Ireland. In addition to her involvement with the UN, she has presented at the 2014 White House Summit on Working Families and the Joseph Biden Institute. She was elected as a National Council on Family Relations (NCFR) Fellow in 2015 and later served as a Program Chair for NCFR in 2018.

== Research ==
Trask's research has focused on the effects of economic shifts on family dynamics and gender roles, the evolving notions of race, ethnicity, and gender in a globalized world, and the formulation of policies to support and empower low-income families. In her studies, she analyzed societal mega-trends such as demographic change, international migration, technological advancements, and the impact of COVID-19 on families, emphasizing the importance of informed policies to support families in achieving United Nations Sustainable Development Goals (SDGs), while also highlighting families' crucial role in fostering inclusive societies by promoting social rights, legal frameworks, participation, and access to housing and public green spaces, aligning with SDGs 16 and 11. Additionally, her research has highlighted various factors impacting families, emphasizing the need to prioritize globalization-families interplay for effective policy implementation.

=== Women and globalization ===
Trask's first edited book, a volume in The Greenwood Encyclopedia of Women's Issues Worldwide provided a coverage of women's efforts for gender equality globally, examining the intersection of local conditions with international influences such as globalization and UN initiatives. Feminist Collections commented that this book, "is a must for all college libraries, and highly recommended for public and high school collections."

Another book authored by Trask, Women, Work, and Globalization, looked into the increasing presence of women in the global labor force, focusing on how it affects their roles in society and within families. Through comparative analysis, it explored the challenges and opportunities women face, from managing work-life balance to the broader social, political, and economic implications of their participation in the workforce. Carol J. Auster remarked, "Trask's book offers insights about the impact of globalization on societies at a variety of levels. Trask avoids the unevenness apparent in some edited volumes. The author not only keeps the promises described above that she makes early in the book, but she also provides students in a variety of social science disciplines more than just a book about women, work, and globalization."

=== Family dynamics ===
Through her edited work, Personal Relationships, she focused on the interplay between healthy relationship dynamics and overall life satisfaction. She explored the influence of cultural diversity on families, shifting the focus from categorization by race or ethnicity to discussing diverse family issues thematically in her edited book, Cultural Diversity and Families: Expanding Perspectives. She also authored, Globalization and Families: Accelerated Systemic Social Change, which discussed the impact of globalization on families, influencing their social, economic, and identity dynamics through work, communication, and cultural exchange. This book has also been translated into Chinese. Rahul Sharma reviewed the book and wrote, "Trask observed that while in the past, locale mattered, today social relationships are maintained over great distances with ease. Global communications such as the internet, e-mail, and satellite linkups are facilitating these relationships over space and time."

== Awards and honors ==
- 2017 – UD Excellence in Teaching Award, University of Delaware
- 2019 – Jan Trost Award, NCFR
- 2022 – Groves Feldman Award, Groves Conference on Marriage and Families

== Bibliography ==
=== Books ===
- The Greenwood Encyclopedia of Women's Issues Worldwide (2003) ISBN 978-0-313-32787-2
- Cultural Diversity and Families: Expanding Perspectives (2007) ISBN 978-1-4129-1542-7
- Globalization and Families: Accelerated Systemic Social Change (2009) ISBN 978-0-387-88284-0
- Personal Relationships (2010) ISBN 978-1-60927-921-9
- Women, Work, and Globalization (2013) ISBN 978-0-415-88338-2

=== Selected articles ===
- Trask, B. S. (2013). Locating multiethnic families in a globalizing world. Family relations, 62(1), 17–29.
- Palkovitz, R., Trask, B. S., & Adamsons, K. (2014). Essential differences in the meaning and processes of mothering and fathering: Family systems, feminist and qualitative perspectives. Journal of Family Theory & Review, 6(4), 406–420.
- Trask, B. S. (2017). Alleviating the stress on working families: Promoting family-friendly workplace policies. National Council on Family Relations Policy Brief, 2(1), 1–6.
- Trask, B. S. (2018). Integrating life course, globalization, and the study of racial and ethnic families. Journal of Family Theory & Review, 10(2), 451–466.
- Trask, B. S. (2018). The role of families in achieving inclusive societies. Focus on Sustainable Development Goals 16 & 11: Ensuring social rights through legal frameworks, participation, housing and public green spaces. UNDESA.
- Trask, B. S. (2020). Mega Trends and Families: The Impact of Demographic Shifts, International Migration and Urbanization, Climate Change, and Technological Transformations. UNDESA.
- Trask, B. S. (2022). Migration, urbanization, and the family dimension. UNDESA.
