= Michael Barone (photographer) =

American photographer

Michael Barone is a Bucks County, Pennsylvania art photographer who has been working in the medium since an Introduction to Photography course at the University of Delaware in the early 1980s. Barone's photographs of the nude form are often charged with social and political themes. His work has been critically acclaimed and has appeared in solo and group shows throughout the United States. He recently released his first book, Contours and Shadows, which is a retrospective collection of his over twenty years of work.

Barone also brings his artistic eye to the public through his wedding, portrait and commercial photography.
