= Michael Mignano =

Co-founder of podcasting platform Anchor

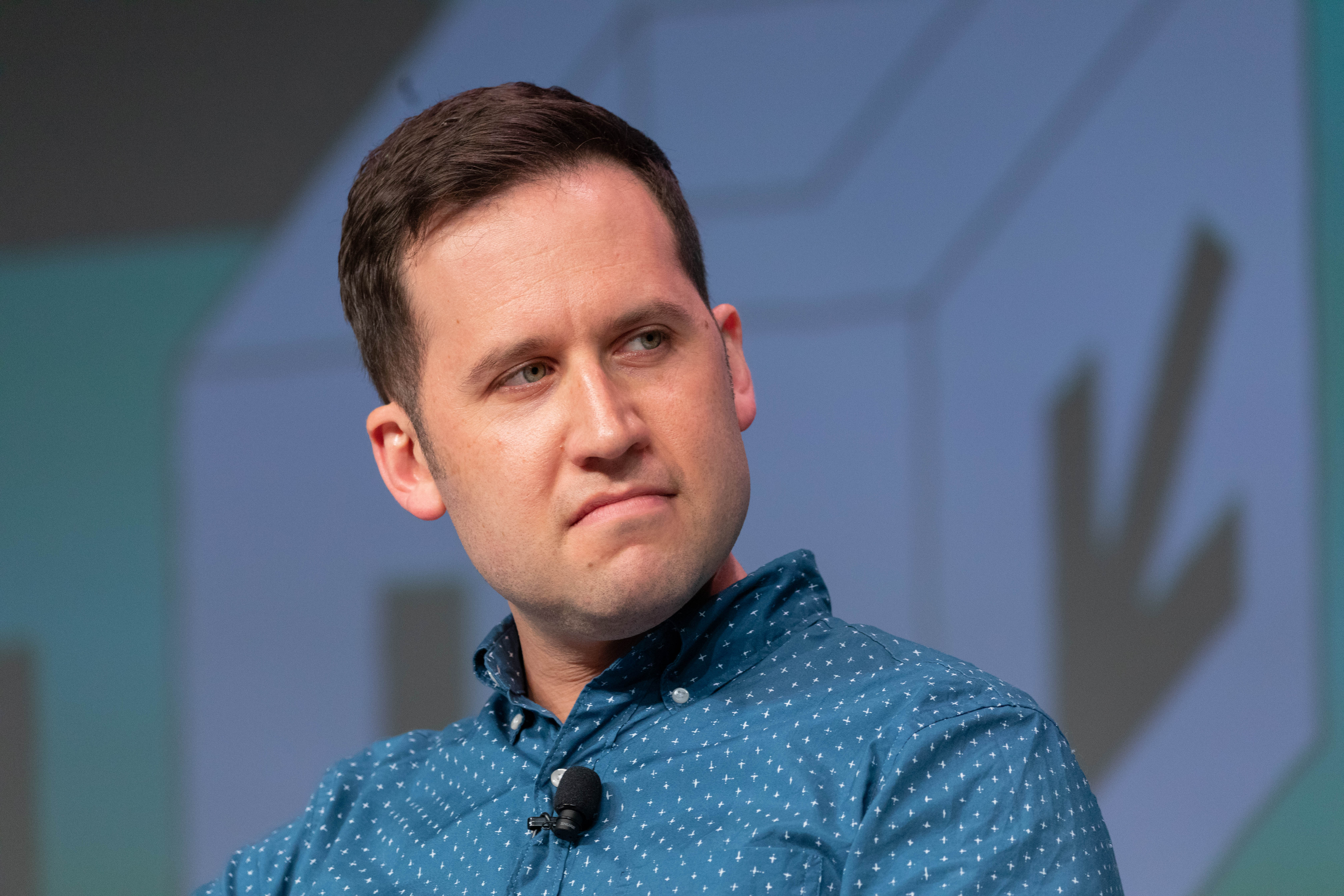
- Michael Mignano
- Education: University of Delaware
- Occupations: Entrepreneur, venture capitalist
- Employer(s): Lightspeed, Spotify
- Notable work: Anchor
- Title: Co-Founder, Anchor

Michael Mignano is an American entrepreneur and venture capitalist. He is a venture capitalist at Lightspeed, the co-founder of the podcasting platform Anchor, and former head of Spotify's talk audio (podcasts, live, and video) business. In 2019, Mignano was regarded by Fortune Magazine as one of the most influential young people in business in their annual "40 under 40" list. Mignano studied Computer Science at the University of Delaware.

== Business career ==
Mignano began his career in the music industry at Atlantic Records before transitioning into tech, first at photo-sharing platform Aviary and then Adobe. In 2016, after struggling to produce podcasts on his own, he started Anchor to make it easier for aspiring creators to broadcast audio with co-founder, Nir Zicherman. The pair received financial backing from a variety of venture capitalists, including Accel, Google's venture arm GV, and the co-founders' former boss from Adobe, Scott Belsky.

In February 2019, Anchor was acquired by Spotify for more than $150M and Mignano became responsible for overseeing the Swedish audio streaming company podcast tech business, as well as their expansion into video and live audio. Under Mignano's leadership, Anchor has grown to power more than 75% of all podcasts. In 2022, after announcing he'd be leaving Spotify to focus on early stage tech investing, Mignano introduced a new feature enabling users to create, edit, and share podcasts directly in the Spotify app.

In 2022, it was announced that Mignano would be joining the Silicon Valley venture capital firm, Lightspeed. He has invested in AI companies including Pika Labs, Suno, and TollBit. In early 2023, Granola raised a $4.25 million seed funding round led by Mignano.

In 2024, Mignano and his former Anchor Co-Founder launched a new AI education company, Oboe.

== Speaking ==
In 2019, Mignano was featured as one of the main keynote speakers at the South by Southwest festival in Austin, TX.
