= Jasper Adams =

American historian

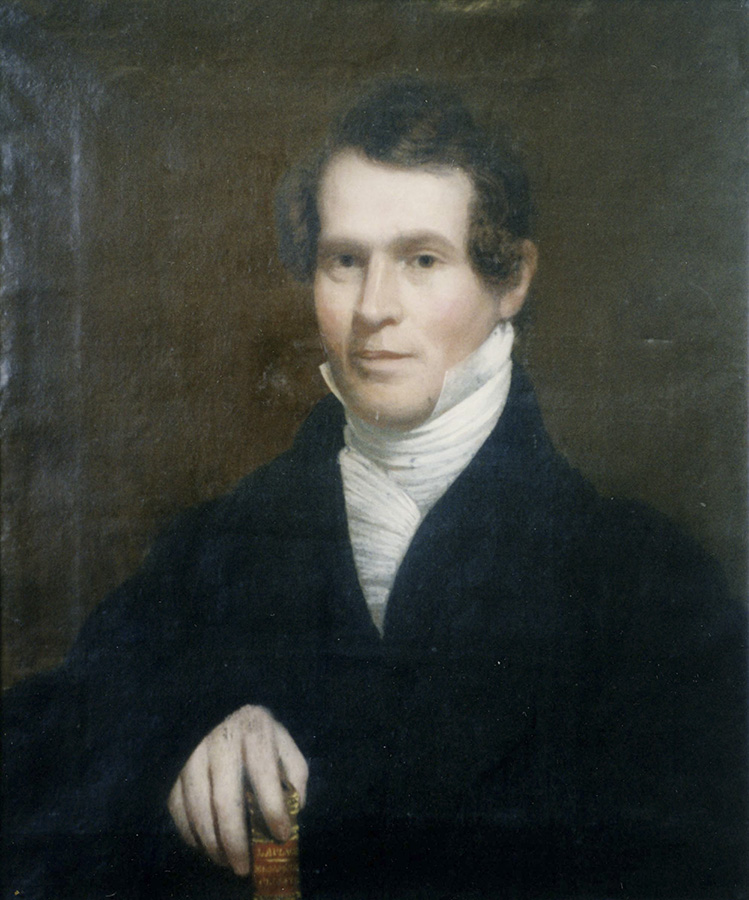
- Born: August 27, 1793; Medway, Massachusetts
- Died: October 25, 1841 (aged 48); Pendleton, South Carolina

Jasper Adams (August 27, 1793 – October 25, 1841) was an American clergyman, college professor, and college president.

== Early years ==
Adams was born in East Medway, Massachusetts, on August 27, 1793, son of Major Jasper Adams and Emma Rounds, and a direct descendant from Henry Adams. He was graduated from Brown University in 1815, studied at Andover, Massachusetts, theological seminary, from 1816 to 1817.

He received the degree of A.M. from Yale in 1819 and that of S.T.D. from Columbia in 1827.

== Career ==
He was a teacher at Phillips Academy of Andover for three years, tutor at Brown, 1818 to 1819, and becoming a professor of mathematics and natural philosophy there, from 1819 to 1824. Adams was ordained in the Protestant Episcopal Church, as a deacon on September 2, 1819, and priest on August 4, 1820.

He became the president of College of Charleston, South Carolina, in 1824, leaving the post temporarily in 1826 to become the president of Geneva College, New York, now called Hobart College, and returned to the presidency of the College of Charleston in 1828, remaining there through 1838.

During this period he wrote the Elements of Moral Philosophy, published in 1837. He was elected a Fellow of the American Academy of Arts and Sciences in 1835.

== Last years ==
In 1838, he became a chaplain and a professor of geography, history and ethics, at the West Point, New York, a position he retained through 1840, when became principal of the seminary at Pendleton, South Carolina, until his death there on October 25, 1841.

Adams was a Freemason, member of Mt. Vernon Lodge No. 4 in Providence, Rhode Island.

== Writings by Jasper Adams ==
- "The Relation of Christianity to Civil Government in the United States" (1833), in The Sacred Rights of Conscience, edited by Daniel L. Dreisbach and Mark David Hall (Indianapolis: Liberty Fund, 2009): 597–610.

== Sources ==
- Who Was Who in America: Historical Volume, 1607-1896. Chicago: Marquis Who's Who, 1963.
