= Keevin Galbraith =

American lacrosse player

Personal information
- Nationality: American
- Born: April 30, 1979 (age 47)
- Height: 6 ft 2 in (188 cm)
- Weight: 210 lb (95 kg; 15 st 0 lb)

Sport
- Position: Defense
- NLL team Former teams: New York Titans; Philadelphia Wings
- NCAA team: University of Delaware
- Pro career: 2002–

Keevin Galbraith (born 1979) attended high school and played lacrosse at Malvern Prep. Keevin was a student-athlete at the University of Delaware and was a four year defensive starter on the lacrosse team. At Delaware, Keevin earned All-tournament team in 2000 and 2001, 1st team All-Conference in 2001 and was one of two players from UD to play in the North South game in 2001. He was also chosen as one of the top 40 Seniors in 2001 to play in the 1st MLL combine.

After college, Keevin was signed as a free agent by the Philadelphia Wings in the NLL, where he played five years, from 2002 to 2006. To improve his indoor game, he went to Vancouver, Canada to play for the North Shore Thunder during 2002 and 2003 summers. He was then picked up by the New York Titans as a free agent in 2006, and played three years before deciding to retire. In 2007, Keevin was 1 of 23 players chosen to play for the USA indoor national team, and helped the team win a bronze medal. Keevin also played for the world champion Philadelphia Barrage in 2006. In 2010 Keevin was asked to be an assistant coach for Team USA in the indoor world games where he coached the likes of Casey Powell and Paul Rabil.

Keevin earned a Health and Physical Education degree at UD and Masters in Special Education from Wilmington University.

== See also ==
- University of Delaware Mens Lacrosse
