= Paul Cherry (author) =

Paul Cherry is an American author, professional speaker, and business trainer, who writes and lectures internationally on sales effectiveness, customer-relationship management, and sales leadership. He lives in Wilmington, Delaware, outside of Philadelphia.

Cherry is the founder of Performance Based Results LLC, a company which sells B2B sales training and performance coaching to teams and managers in corporations across the US and Canada. Cherry's sales presentation methods have been featured in publications such as Sales & Marketing Management and Selling Power.

Cherry is a graduate of the University of Delaware where he holds a BA and MPA degree. He has been a member of the National Speakers Association.

== Publications ==
Questions That Sell – The Powerful Process for Discovering What Your Customer Really Wants (AMACOM) was published in 2006. A second edition (HarperCollins Leadership) was released in 2017.

Questions That Get Results – Innovative Ideas Managers Can Use to Improve Their Teams’ Performance (Wiley) was published in November 2010 and coauthored by Patrick Connor.

The Ultimate Sales Pro – What The Best Sales People Do Differently (HarperCollins Leadership) was published in August 2018.
