= Mickey Heinecken =

American sports coach (born 1939)

Biographical details
- Born: January 25, 1939 (age 87)

Playing career

Football
- 1958–1960: Delaware

Coaching career (HC unless noted)

Football
- 1961: Delaware (GA)
- 1963: Fort Benning (line)
- 1965: Delaware (assistant)
- 1966–1972: Delaware (DB)
- 1973–2000: Middlebury

Lacrosse
- 1962–1963: Delaware
- 1966–1972: Delaware

Tennis
- 1973–1988: Middlebury

Head coaching record
- Overall: 126–96–2 (football); 65–37 (lacrosse); 82–73 (tennis)

Accomplishments and honors

Championships
- Football; 1 NESCAC (2000)

Michael G. "Mickey" Heinecken (born January 25, 1939) is an American former college football, lacrosse, and tennis coach. He served as the head football coach at Middlebury College from 1973 to 2000, compiling a record of 126–96–2. He has the most wins and longest tenure of any head coach in the history of the Middlebury Panthers football program. In his final season, Heinecken guided the Panthers to a New England Small College Athletic Conference (NESCAC) co-championship. Heinecken played college football at the University of Delaware from 1958 to 1960.

== Head coaching record ==
=== Football ===
Year	Team	Overall	Conference	Standing	Bowl/playoffs
Middlebury Panthers (NCAA Division III independent) (1973–1999)
1973	Middlebury	7–1			
1974	Middlebury	5–3			
1975	Middlebury	4–4			
1976	Middlebury	7–1			
1977	Middlebury	7–1			
1978	Middlebury	5–3			
1979	Middlebury	5–3			
1980	Middlebury	6–1–1			
1981	Middlebury	7–1			
1982	Middlebury	4–4			
1983	Middlebury	6–2			
1984	Middlebury	1–7			
1985	Middlebury	3–5			
1986	Middlebury	4–4			
1987	Middlebury	4–4			
1988	Middlebury	1–7			
1989	Middlebury	2–5–1			
1990	Middlebury	4–4			
1991	Middlebury	2–6			
1992	Middlebury	7–1			
1993	Middlebury	5–3			
1994	Middlebury	3–5			
1995	Middlebury	2–6			
1996	Middlebury	5–3			
1997	Middlebury	4–4			
1998	Middlebury	3–5			
1999	Middlebury	6–2			
Middlebury Panthers (New England Small College Athletic Conference) (2000)
2000	Middlebury	7–1	7–1	T–1st	
Middlebury:		126–96–2	7–1		
Total:		126–96–2			
National championship Conference title Conference division title or championship game berth
