= Eliphalet Wheeler Gilbert =

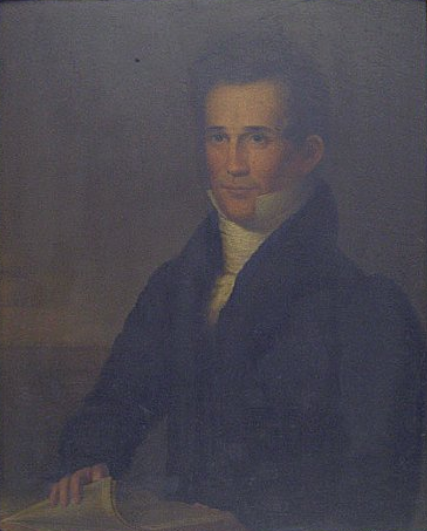
- Portrait of Gilbert

1st and 3rd President of the University of Delaware
- In office September 23, 1834 – June 8, 1835
- Preceded by: none
- Succeeded by: Richard Sharpe Mason
- In office May 1840 or May 1841 – April 1847
- Preceded by: Richard Sharpe Mason
- Succeeded by: James Patriot Wilson Jr.

Personal details
- Born: December 19, 1793 Lebanon, New York, U.S.
- Died: July 31, 1853 (aged 59) Philadelphia County, Pennsylvania, U.S.
- Education: Union College

Eliphalet Wheeler Gilbert (December 19, 1793 – July 31, 1853) was an American Presbyterian minister who served as the first and third president of Delaware College (now University of Delaware) from 1834 to 1835 and from 1840 to 1847.

== Biography ==
Gilbert was born on December 19, 1793, in Lebanon, New York. He was the son of Elisha and Ellen Gilbert, and was the eldest of ten children. He was educated by his grandfather, Elisha, who had come from Hebron, Connecticut. His grandmother devoted him to ministry and his grandfather educated him for this purpose. At the age of 13, Gilbert was placed on the care of Rev. Dr. Nott, of Schenectady. He lived in Schenectady for about six years and graduated from Union College at the age of 20. The year after his graduation, Gilbert went to Philadelphia to spend time with a relative. He was not at the time professedly pious, though he seems to have had the ministry always in view; but it was not long after this, that he experienced, as he believed, a radical change in character, which he attributed, under God, to his own study of the scriptures.

In 1814, Gilbert joined the Theological Seminary at Princeton University. He was licensed to preach in 1817, and shortly afterwards accompanied Rev. Backus Wilbur on a mission of six months to the West. Upon returning at the end of the year, Gilbert was unanimously elected pastor of the Second Presbyterian Church in Wilmington, Delaware, where he settled.

At Wilmington, Gilbert found a large number of people who were strongly opposed to what Gilbert defined as true Christianity. Regarding their views as a fundamental error, he "attacked them with great boldness," and the result was a controversy through the public prints which was afterwards published in a volume called "The Letters of Paul and Amicus." He later engaged in an oral controversy with a similar group of people, in which he "showed great power" and secured respect of even his opponents. When very ill, the person who was most against Gilbert served as his physician. Other opponents inquired concerning Gilbert with great interest; one of them saying "he is such a generous opponent, I hope he will not die."

Gilbert often made missionary visits to nearby towns and neighborhoods, helping establish new churches and encourage existing ones. Some prominent men in the region, who had previously been neglectful of religion, were brought to reflection and repentance through his instrumentality.

On October 21, 1819, Gilbert married Lydia Munro, the eldest daughter of a church elder, with whom he had five daughters and one son.

In 1829, Gilbert became the pastor at the new Hanover Street Church, where he continued until being released by his own request in April 1834. In May, he engaged in an agency for the American Education Society, where he served for five months. He was elected first president of Delaware College on September 23, and resigned from the American Education Society, due to it being not congenial with his studious habits, to accept the position at Delaware College. He started his duties at the school on October 29, and helped start an "extensive revival" of religion at the college.

On June 8, 1835, Gilbert resigned as president of the school. He strongly opposed lotteries and gambling, which had been used to fund the college, so he resigned rather than continue to serve as president, saying he could not remain at a college that "rested upon an immoral basis."

In the following September, Gilbert returned as pastor of the Hanover Street Church, where he served several years.

In May 1840, (Note: The University of Delaware and a May 1894 edition of The Evening Journal record the year to be 1840, while later editions of The Evening Journal, Annals of the American Pulpit: Presbyterian, and The Cyclopedia of Biblical, Theological, and Ecclesiastical Literature wrote that Gilbert returned in 1841.) Gilbert returned as president of Delaware College under the condition that the lottery scheme be given up. In April 1847, he resigned to become pastor at the Western Presbyterian Church in Philadelphia, Pennsylvania. He moved to Philadelphia in the following July, and remained there for the rest of his life. He died from illness on July 31, 1853, at the age of 59.
