= Ralph Begleiter =

American journalist and educator

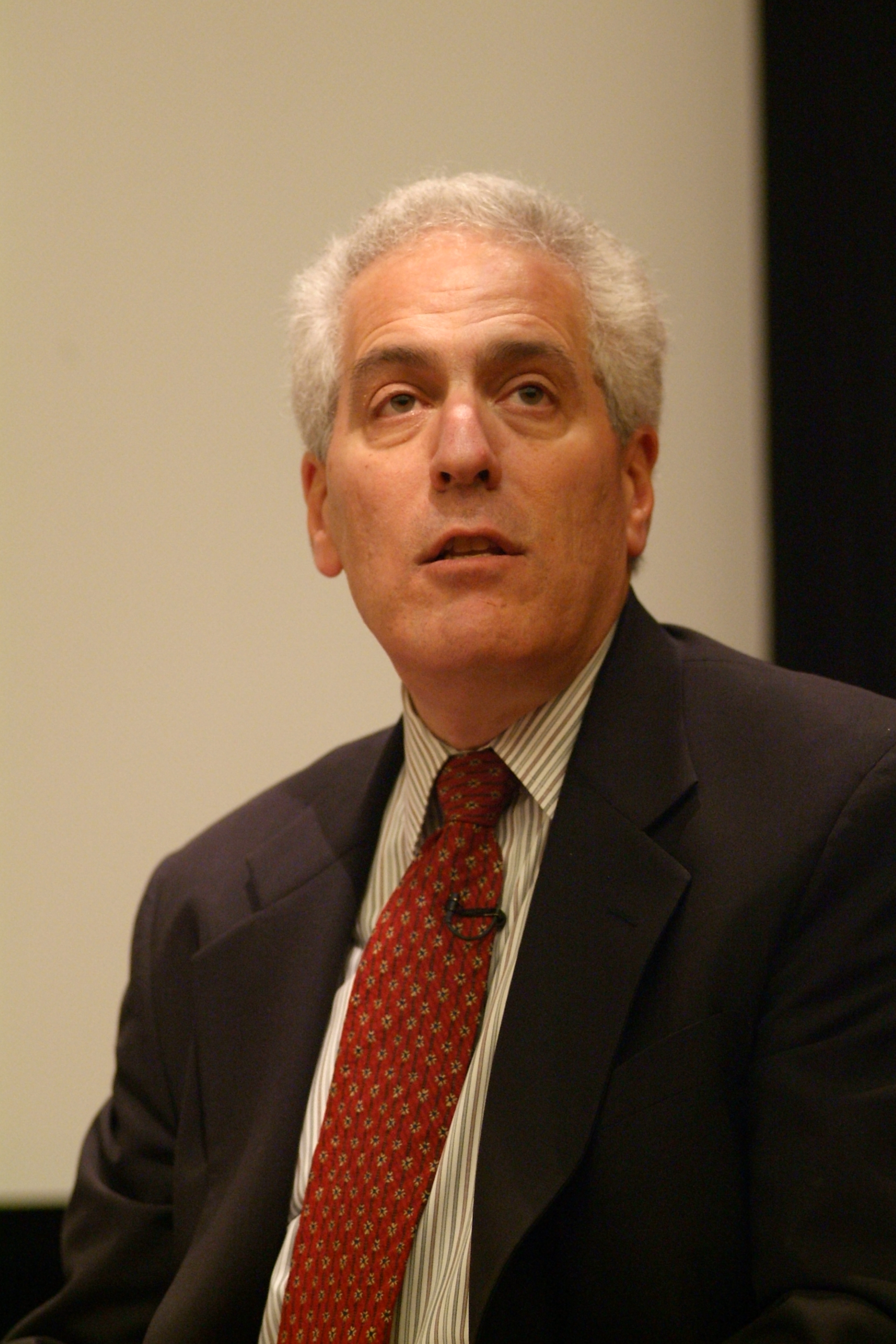
Begleiter in 2006

Ralph J. Begleiter (born 1949 in New York City) is a retired American journalist and educator who taught courses in communication, political science and journalism at the University of Delaware.

== Career ==
He holds an Honors B.A. in political science from Brown University and an M.S. in journalism from Columbia University. He was Founding Director of the university's Center for Political Communication, hosted the TV series Great Decisions, broadcast on many PBS stations, and worked for two decades in CNN's Washington bureau as its world affairs correspondent. In the mid-1990s, working with the National Security Archive at George Washington University, he used the Freedom of Information Act to prompt the Pentagon to release hundreds of previously unreleased photos of U.S. military personnel returning from wars in Afghanistan and Iraq in flag-draped caskets.
