= 2016 NCAA Division II men's lacrosse tournament =

American collegiate lacrosse tournament

2016 NCAA Division II Men's Lacrosse Championship
Tournament information
- Sport: College lacrosse
- Location: United States
- Dates: May 14, 2016–May 29, 2016
- Venue(s): Lincoln Financial Field; Philadelphia, PA
- Participants: 8

Final positions
- Champions: LeMoyne (5th title)
- Runner-up: Limestone

Tournament statistics
- Matches played: 7
- Goals scored: 130 (18.57 per match)

The 2016 NCAA Division II Men's Lacrosse Championship is the 32nd annual single-elimination tournament to determine the national champions of NCAA Division II men's college lacrosse in the United States. The championship game will be played at Lincoln Financial Field in Philadelphia, Pennsylvania on May 29, 2016. All other matches will be played at campus sites, always at the home field of the higher-seeded team, from May 14 to 22.

LeMoyne defeated defending-champions Limestone in the final, 8−4, to win their fifth national title.

== Qualification ==
All Division II men's lacrosse programs were eligible for this championship. A total of eight teams were invited: the top four teams from the Division II lacrosse's North and South Regions.

North Region
Seed	Team	Record
1	Le Moyne	17–0
2	Merrimack	14–2
3	LIU Post	12–3
4	NYIT	13–4

South Region
Seed	Team	Record
1	Limestone	19–0
2	Mercyhurst	15–2
3	Tampa	14–2
4	Mount Olive	13–4

== Bracket ==
Quarterfinals; May 14, 2016; Campus Sites
N1	Le Moyne*	8^{OT}
N4	NYIT	7
North Region
N3	LIU Post	13
N2	Merrimack*	15
S1	Limestone*	15
S4	Mount Olive	6
South Region
S3	Mercyhurst	9
S2	Tampa*	10^{OT}

Semifinals; May 22, 2016; Campus Sites
N1	Le Moyne*	8
N2	Merrimack	4
S1	Limestone*	13
S2	Tampa	10

Championship; May 29, 2016; Philadelphia, PA
N1	Le Moyne	8
S1	Limestone	4

- Note: An asterisk marks the host team

== See also ==
- NCAA Division I Men's Lacrosse Championship
- NCAA Division III Men's Lacrosse Championship
- NCAA Division II Women's Lacrosse Championship
