= 2002 NCAA Division II men's lacrosse tournament =

2002 NCAA Division II Men's Lacrosse Championship
Tournament information
- Sport: College lacrosse
- Location: Piscataway, New Jersey
- Host(s): Rutgers University
- Venue(s): Yurcak Field
- Participants: 4

Final positions
- Champions: Limestone (2nd title)
- Runner-up: NYIT (3rd title game)

Tournament statistics
- Matches played: 3
- Goals scored: 59 (19.67 per match)
- Attendance: 3,298 (1,099 per match)
- MVP: Devan Spilker, Limestone
- Top scorer(s): Nick Carlson, Limestone (10)

The 2002 NCAA Division II Men's Lacrosse Championship was the 18th annual tournament to determine the national champions of NCAA Division II men's college lacrosse in the United States.

The final was played at Yurcak Field at Rutgers University in Piscataway, New Jersey.

Limestone defeated NYIT in the championship game, 11–9, to claim the Saints' second Division II national title.

== Bracket ==
Semifinals
Le Moyne	9
NYIT	12
Limestone	11
St. Andrews	7

Championship
NYIT	9
Limestone	11

== See also ==
- 2002 NCAA Division I Men's Lacrosse Championship
