= 2001 NCAA Division II men's lacrosse tournament =

2001 NCAA Division II Men's Lacrosse Championship
Tournament information
- Sport: College lacrosse
- Location: Piscataway, New Jersey
- Host(s): Rutgers University
- Venue(s): Yurcak Field
- Participants: 4

Final positions
- Champions: Adelphi (7th title)
- Runner-up: Limestone (2nd title game)

Tournament statistics
- Matches played: 3
- Goals scored: 71 (23.67 per match)
- Attendance: 3,058 (1,019 per match)
- MVP: Mike McInerney, Adelphi
- Top scorer(s): Mike McInerney, Adelphi (9)

The 2001 NCAA Division II Men's Lacrosse Championship was the 17th annual tournament to determine the national champions of NCAA Division II men's college lacrosse in the United States.

The final was played at Yurcak Field at Rutgers University in Piscataway, New Jersey.

Adelphi defeated Limestone in the championship game, 14–10, to claim the Panthers' seventh Division II national title.

The tournament field increased for the first time under the second incarnation of the NCAA's Division II men's lacrosse tournament, increasing from two to four teams.

A women's Division II tournament was also held for the first time in 2001.

== Bracket ==
Semifinals
Adelphi	16
C.W. Post	8
Limestone	20
Wingate	3

Championship
Adelphi	14
Limestone	10

== See also ==
- 2001 NCAA Division I Men's Lacrosse Championship
