= 2003 NCAA Division II men's lacrosse tournament =

2003 NCAA Division II Men's Lacrosse Championship
Tournament information
- Sport: College lacrosse
- Location: Baltimore, Maryland
- Venue(s): M&T Bank Stadium
- Participants: 4

Final positions
- Champions: NYIT (2nd title)
- Runner-up: Limestone (4th title game)

Tournament statistics
- Matches played: 3
- Goals scored: 52 (17.33 per match)
- Attendance: 16,818 (5,606 per match)
- MVP: Matt Hunter, NYIT
- Top scorer(s): Frank Lawrence, NYIT (7); Tom Zummo, NYIT (7); Devan Spilker, Limestone (7)

The 2003 NCAA Division II Men's Lacrosse Championship was the 19th annual tournament to determine the national champions of NCAA Division II men's college lacrosse in the United States.

The final was played at M&T Bank Stadium, the home stadium of the NFL Baltimore Ravens, in Baltimore, Maryland. In a tradition that remains, this was the first tournament final held in the same venue as the concurrent Division I and Division III NCAA men's lacrosse tournaments.

In a rematch of the previous year's final, NYIT defeated defending champions Limestone in the championship game, 9–4, to claim the Bears' second Division II national title.

== Bracket ==
Semifinals
Limestone | 12
Mercyhurst | 4
Le Moyne | 11
NYIT | 12

Championship
Limestone | 4
NYIT | 9

== See also ==
- 2003 NCAA Division I Men's Lacrosse Championship
