= NCAA Division II men's lacrosse tournament =

Annual tournament in the United States

- Association: NCAA
- Sport: College field lacrosse
- Founded: 1974; 52 years ago
- Division: Division II
- No. of teams: 16
- Country: United States
- Most recent champion: Tampa (2nd)
- Most titles: Adelphi (9)
- Website: NCAA.com

The NCAA Division II men's lacrosse tournament is the annual championship which is organized by the NCAA to help determine the national champion of men's collegiate field lacrosse at the Division II level for their programs in the United States.

The tournament has been played every year, with the exception of 2020, in two stints: first from 1974 to 1981 and then again from 1993 the present.

Before the implementation of a separate Division III tournament in 1979, the first five iterations of the event featured teams from both Divisions II and III.

During the eleven-year period (1982 to 1992) in which no Division II championship existed, all Division II men's lacrosse programs were allowed by the NCAA to compete as Division I members in that sport, and several D II teams received invitations to the Division I tournament during this period (Adelphi in 1982; C.W. Post in 1986; Adelphi again in 1987, where they upset Army; and Adelphi once more in 1989, where they received a number five seeding).

Adelphi have been the most successful program, with 8 national titles in their history.

While Tampa are the reigning national champions, winning their second ever national title in the sport happening 2026.

== History ==
After the NCAA began to sponsor a lacrosse in 1971 and before the creation of a standalone Division II event in 1974, the United States Intercollegiate Lacrosse Association added a "small college" tournament for two years for non-Division I schools. Hobart defeated Washington College to win the subsequent 1972 USILA title, and Cortland State then beat Washington College in 1973. This tournament was superseded by this new Division II tournament in 1974.

== Results ==
NCAA Division II men's lacrosse tournament (NCAA Men's College Division Lacrosse Championship)
Year	Site (Host Team)	Stadium	Championship Results			Semifinalists
Year	Site (Host Team)	Stadium	Champion	Score	Runner-up	Semifinalists
1974; Details	Cortland, NY (Cortland State)	SUNY Cortland Stadium Complex	Towson State	18–17	Hobart	Adelphi and Cortland State
1975; Details	Brookville, NY (C.W. Post)	C.W. Post Stadium	Cortland State	12–11	Hobart	Towson State and Washington College
1976; Details	Catonsville, MD (UMBC)	UMBC Stadium	Hobart	18–9	Adelphi	Ohio Wesleyan and Washington College
1977; Details	Geneva, NY (Hobart)	Boswell Field	Hobart (2)	23–13	Washington College	Roanoke and UMBC
1978; Details	Geneva, NY (Hobart)	Boswell Field	Roanoke	14–13	Hobart	Cortland State and UMBC
1979; Details	Garden City, NY (Adelphi)	Motamed Field	Adelphi	17–12	UMBC	St. Lawrence and Towson State
1980; Details	Catonsville, MD (UMBC)	UMBC Stadium	UMBC	23–14	Adelphi	No semifinals held
1981; Details	Garden City, NY (Adelphi)	Motamed Field	Adelphi (2)	17–14	Loyola (MD)	No semifinals held
1982–1992	No championship held					
1993; Details	Brookville, NY (C.W. Post)	C.W. Post Stadium	Adelphi (3)	11–7	C.W. Post	No semifinals held
1994; Details	Brookville, NY (C.W. Post)	C.W. Post Stadium	Springfield	15–12	NYIT	No semifinals held
1995; Details	Springfield, MA (Springfield)	Stagg Field	Adelphi (4)	12–10	Springfield	No semifinals held
1996; Details	Brookville, NY (C.W. Post)	C.W. Post Stadium	C.W. Post	15–10	Adelphi	No semifinals held
1997; Details	Garden City, NY (Adelphi)	Motamed Field	NYIT	18–11	Adelphi	No semifinals held
1998; Details	Piscataway, NJ (Rutgers)	Rutgers Stadium	Adelphi (5)	18–6	C.W. Post	No semifinals held
1999; Details	College Park, MD (Maryland)	Byrd Stadium	Adelphi (6)	11–8	C.W. Post	No semifinals held
2000; Details	College Park, MD (Maryland)	Byrd Stadium	Limestone	10–9	C.W. Post	No semifinals held
2001; Details	Piscataway, NJ (Rutgers)	Rutgers Stadium	Adelphi (7)	14–10	Limestone	C.W. Post and Wingate
2002; Details	Piscataway, NJ (Rutgers)	Rutgers Stadium	Limestone (2)	11–9	NYIT	Le Moyne and St. Andrew's (NC)
2003; Details	Baltimore, MD	M&T Bank Stadium	NYIT	9–4	Limestone	Le Moyne and Mercyhurst
2004; Details	Baltimore, MD	M&T Bank Stadium	Le Moyne	11–10 (2OT)	Limestone	Mercyhurst and NYIT
2005; Details	Philadelphia, PA	Lincoln Financial Field	NYIT (2)	14–13 (OT)	Limestone	C.W. Post and Le Moyne
2006; Details	Philadelphia, PA	Lincoln Financial Field	Le Moyne (2)	12–5	Dowling	Limestone and Mercyhurst
2007; Details	Baltimore, MD	M&T Bank Stadium	Le Moyne (3)	6–5	Mercyhurst	Limestone and NYIT
2008; Details	Foxborough, MA	Gillette Stadium	NYIT (3)	16–11	Le Moyne	Bryant and Limestone
2009; Details	Foxborough, MA	Gillette Stadium	C.W. Post (2)	8–7	Le Moyne	Limestone and Merrimack
2010; Details	Baltimore, MD	M&T Bank Stadium	C.W. Post (3)	14–9	Le Moyne	Dowling and Limestone
2011; Details	Baltimore, MD	M&T Bank Stadium	Mercyhurst	9–8	Adelphi	C.W. Post and Limestone
2012; Details	Foxborough, MA	Gillette Stadium	Dowling	11–10	Limestone	Le Moyne and Mercyhurst
2013; Details	Philadelphia, PA	Lincoln Financial Field	Le Moyne (4)	11–10	Mercyhurst	Adelphi and Limestone
2014; Details	Baltimore, MD	M&T Bank Stadium	Limestone (3)	12–6	LIU Post	Adelphi and Tampa
2015; Details	Philadelphia, PA	Lincoln Financial Field	Limestone (4)	9–6	Le Moyne	Lake Erie and Merrimack
2016; Details	Philadelphia, PA	Lincoln Financial Field	Le Moyne (5)	8-4	Limestone	Merrimack and Tampa
2017; Details	Foxborough, MA	Gillette Stadium	Limestone (5)	11-9	Merrimack	Adelphi and Tampa
2018; Details	Foxborough, MA	Gillette Stadium	Merrimack	23-6	St. Leo	Seton Hill and Lenoir–Rhyne
2019; Details	Philadelphia, PA	Lincoln Financial Field	Merrimack (2)	16-8	Limestone	Le Moyne and Indianapolis
2020; Details	Philadelphia, PA	Lincoln Financial Field	Canceled due to COVID-19			
2021; Details	East Hartford, CT	Pratt & Whitney Stadium	Le Moyne (6)	12–6	Lenoir–Rhyne	Mercyhurst and Wingate
2022; Details	East Hartford, CT	Pratt & Whitney Stadium	Tampa	11–7	Mercy	Le Moyne and Limestone
2023; Details	Philadelphia, PA	Lincoln Financial Field	Lenoir-Rhyne	20-5	Mercyhurst	Le Moyne and Limestone
2024; Details	Philadelphia, PA	Lincoln Financial Field	Adelphi (8)	12-10	Lenoir-Rhyne	Tampa and Saint Anselm
2025; Details	Foxborough, MA	Gillette Stadium	Adelphi (9)	9-8 (OT)	Tampa	Maryville University and Saint Anselm
2026; Details	Charlottesville, Virginia (Virginia)	Scott Stadium	Tampa (2)	12-11 (OT)	Adelphi	Molloy and Anderson (SC)
2027	Philadelphia, PA	Lincoln Financial Field				
2028	Foxborough, MA	Gillette Stadium				

== Team championship records ==
Team	Championships	Appearances	Winning years
Adelphi	9	15	1979, 1981, 1993, 1995, 1998, 1999, 2001, 2024, 2025
Le Moyne ‡	6	10	2004, 2006, 2007, 2013, 2016, 2021
Limestone ✝	5	12	2000, 2002, 2014, 2015, 2017
NYIT ✝	4	6	1997, 2003, 2005, 2008
LIU Post ✝ (Note: Known as C.W. Post before the 2012 season.) (Note: The LIU Post athletic program was merged with the Division I program of Long Island University's Brooklyn campus in July 2019. The new program, playing as the LIU Sharks, maintains Brooklyn's Division I membership, but the men's lacrosse program inherited Post's records, since it was the only one of the campuses that sponsored men's lacrosse.)	3	8	1996, 2009, 2010
Hobart ‡ (Note: Current NCAA Division III member that plays Division I men's lacrosse.)	2	5	1976, 1977
Merrimack ‡ (Note: Current NCAA Division I member.)	2	3	2018, 2019
Tampa	2	3	2022, 2026
Towson ‡ (Note: Known as Towson State before the 1998 season.)	1	1	1974
Cortland ‡ (Note: Current NCAA Division III member.)	1	1	1975
Roanoke ‡	1	1	1978
UMBC ‡	1	2	1980
Springfield ‡	1	2	1994
Mercyhurst ‡	1	4	2011
Dowling ✝	1	2	2012
Lenoir–Rhyne	1	3	2023
Mercy (NY)	0	1	
Loyola (MD) ‡	0	1	
Saint Leo	0	1	
Washington College ‡	0	1	

- ✝ indicates schools which are closed or no longer sponsor athletics.
- ‡ indicates schools which have reclassified athletics from NCAA Division II.

=== Finals appearances by state ===
State	Titles	University	Runners-up	University
(New York (state)) New York	26	Adelphi (9), Le Moyne (6), NY Tech (4), LIU Post (3), Hobart (2), Dowling (1), SUNY Cortland (1)	22	Adelphi (6), LIU Post (5), LeMoyne (4), Hobart (3), NY Tech (2), Mercy (1), Dowling (1)
South Carolina	5	Limestone (5)	7	Limestone (7)
Massachusetts	3	Merrimack (2), Springfield (1)	2	Merrimack (1), Springfield (1)
Florida	2	Tampa (2)	2	St. Leo (1), Tampa (1)
Maryland	2	UMBC (1), Towson (1)	3	UMBC (1), Loyola (1), Washington (1)
Pennsylvania	1	Mercyhurst (1)	2	Mercyhurst (2)
North Carolina	1	Lenoir-Rhyne (1)	2	Lenoir-Rhyne (2)
Virginia	1	Roanoke (1)	0	

== See also ==
- NCAA Division II Women's Lacrosse Championship
- NCAA Division I Men's Lacrosse Championship
- NCAA Division III Men's Lacrosse Championship
- United States Intercollegiate Lacrosse Association
- Wingate Memorial Trophy
- North–South Senior All-Star Game
- Pre-NCAA Lacrosse Champion
