= 2004 NCAA Division II men's lacrosse tournament =

2004 NCAA Division II Men's Lacrosse Championship
Tournament information
- Sport: College lacrosse
- Location: Baltimore, Maryland
- Venue(s): M&T Bank Stadium
- Participants: 4

Final positions
- Champions: Le Moyne (1st title)
- Runner-up: Limestone (5th title game)

Tournament statistics
- Matches played: 3
- Goals scored: 59 (19.67 per match)
- Attendance: 20,859 (6,953 per match)
- MVP: Matt Hunter, NYIT
- Top scorer(s): Brandon Spillett, Le Moyne (9)

The 2004 NCAA Division II Men's Lacrosse Championship was the 20th annual tournament to determine the national champions of NCAA Division II men's college lacrosse in the United States.

The final was played at M&T Bank Stadium, the home stadium of the NFL's Baltimore Ravens, in Baltimore, Maryland. The final was held in Baltimore alongside the championship games of the Division I and Division III NCAA men's lacrosse tournaments.

Le Moyne defeated Limestone in the championship game, 11–10 after two overtimes, to claim the Dolphins' first Division II national title.

== Bracket ==
Semifinals
Le Moyne	7
NYIT	5
Limestone	14
Mercyhurst	12

Championship
Le Moyne	11**
Limestone	10

== See also ==
- 2004 NCAA Division I Men's Lacrosse Championship
