= 1993 NCAA Division II lacrosse tournament =

1993 NCAA Division II Lacrosse Championship
Tournament information
- Sport: College lacrosse
- Location: (New York (state)) Brookville, New York
- Host(s): C.W. Post College
- Venue(s): C.W. Post Stadium
- Participants: 2

Final positions
- Champions: Adelphi (3rd title)
- Runner-up: C.W. Post (1st title game)

Tournament statistics
- Matches played: 1
- Goals scored: 18 (18 per match)
- Attendance: 921 (921 per match)
- Top scorer(s): Gary Reh, Adelphi (4); Brian Eisenberg, Adelphi (4)

The 1993 NCAA Division II Lacrosse Championship was the ninth annual tournament to determine the national champions of NCAA Division II men's college lacrosse in the United States, although the first incarnation of a separate Division II tournament since 1981.

The final, and only match of the tournament, was played at C.W. Post Stadium at C.W. Post College in Brookville, New York.

Adelphi defeated hosts C.W. Post, 11–7, to claim the Panthers' third Division II national title.

== Bracket ==
Championship
Adelphi	11
C.W. Post	7

== See also ==
- 1993 NCAA Division I Men's Lacrosse Championship
- 1993 NCAA Division I Women's Lacrosse Championship
