= 1998 NCAA Division II lacrosse tournament =

1998 NCAA Division II Lacrosse Championship
Tournament information
- Sport: College lacrosse
- Location: Piscataway, New Jersey
- Host(s): Rutgers University
- Venue(s): Yurcak Field
- Participants: 2

Final positions
- Champions: Adelphi (5th title)
- Runner-up: C.W. Post (3rd title game)

Tournament statistics
- Matches played: 1
- Goals scored: 24 (24 per match)
- Attendance: 1,616 (1,616 per match)
- MVP: Anthony Picone, Adelphi
- Top scorer(s): Anthony Picone, Adelphi (4); Charlie Flaherty, Adelphi (4); Mark Mangan, Adelphi (4); James Miceli, Adelphi (4)

The 1998 NCAA Division II Lacrosse Championship was the 14th annual tournament to determine the national champions of NCAA Division II men's college lacrosse in the United States.

The final, and only match of the tournament, was played at Yurcak Field at Rutgers University in Piscataway, New Jersey.

Adelphi defeated C.W. Post in the championship game, 18–6, to claim the Panthers' fifth Division II national title.

== Bracket ==
Championship
Adelphi	18
C.W. Post	6

== See also ==
- 1998 NCAA Division I Men's Lacrosse Championship
- 1998 NCAA Division I Women's Lacrosse Championship
