= 1996 NCAA Division II lacrosse tournament =

1996 NCAA Division II Lacrosse Championship
Tournament information
- Sport: College lacrosse
- Location: (New York (state)) Brookville, New York
- Host(s): C.W. Post College
- Venue(s): C.W. Post Stadium
- Participants: 2

Final positions
- Champions: C.W. Post (1st title)
- Runner-up: Adelphi (7th title game)

Tournament statistics
- Matches played: 1
- Goals scored: 25 (25 per match)
- Attendance: 952 (952 per match)
- MVP: Todd Dolognese, C.W. Post
- Top scorer(s): Dave Loiacano, C.W. Post (6)

The 1996 NCAA Division II Lacrosse Championship was the 12th annual tournament to determine the national champions of NCAA Division II men's college lacrosse in the United States.

The final, and only match of the tournament, was played at C.W. Post Stadium at C.W. Post College in Brookville, New York.

Hosts C.W. Post defeated defending champions Adelphi in the championship game, 15–10, to claim the Pioneers' first Division II national title.

== Bracket ==
Championship
Adelphi	10
C.W. Post	15

== See also ==
- 1996 NCAA Division I Men's Lacrosse Championship
- 1996 NCAA Division I Women's Lacrosse Championship
- 1996 NCAA Division III Men's Lacrosse Championship
