= 2000 NCAA Division II lacrosse tournament =

2000 NCAA Division II Lacrosse Championship
Tournament information
- Sport: College lacrosse
- Location: College Park, Maryland
- Host(s): University of Maryland, College Park
- Venue(s): Ludwig Field
- Participants: 2

Final positions
- Champions: Limestone (1st title)
- Runner-up: C.W. Post (5th title game)

Tournament statistics
- Matches played: 1
- Goals scored: 19 (19 per match)
- Attendance: 2,019 (2,019 per match)
- MVP: Nick Carlson, Limestone
- Top scorer(s): Benny Cottone, C.W. Post (5)

The 2000 NCAA Division II Lacrosse Championship was the 16th annual tournament to determine the national champions of NCAA Division II men's college lacrosse in the United States.

The final, and only match of the tournament, was played at Ludwig Field at the University of Maryland in College Park, Maryland.

Limestone defeated C.W. Post in the championship game, 10–9, to claim the Saints' first Division II national title. Limestone became the southern-most school to win a national title in lacrosse, as well as the first from the state of South Carolina.

== Bracket ==
Championship
C.W. Post	9
Limestone	10

== See also ==
- 2000 NCAA Division I Men's Lacrosse Championship
- 2000 NCAA Division I Women's Lacrosse Championship
