= 1999 NCAA Division II lacrosse tournament =

1999 NCAA Division II Lacrosse Championship
Tournament information
- Sport: College lacrosse
- Location: College Park, Maryland
- Host(s): University of Maryland, College Park
- Venue(s): Ludwig Field
- Participants: 2

Final positions
- Champions: Adelphi (6th title)
- Runner-up: C.W. Post (4th title game)

Tournament statistics
- Matches played: 1
- Goals scored: 19 (19 per match)
- Attendance: 1,429 (1,429 per match)
- MVP: Anthony Saccone, Adelphi
- Top scorer(s): Brian Tower, Adelphi (4)

The 1999 NCAA Division II Lacrosse Championship was the 15th annual tournament to determine the national champions of NCAA Division II men's college lacrosse in the United States.

The final, and only match of the tournament, was played at Ludwig Field at the University of Maryland in College Park, Maryland.

Defending champions Adelphi defeated C.W. Post in the championship game, 11–8, to claim the Panthers' sixth Division II national title.

== Bracket ==
| Championship |
| Adelphi | 11 |
| C.W. Post | 8 |

== See also ==
- 1999 NCAA Division I Men's Lacrosse Championship
- 1999 NCAA Division I Women's Lacrosse Championship
