= 1995 NCAA Division II lacrosse tournament =

1995 NCAA Division II Lacrosse Championship
Tournament information
- Sport: College lacrosse
- Location: Springfield, Massachusetts
- Host(s): Springfield College
- Venue(s): Stagg Field
- Participants: 2

Final positions
- Champions: Adelphi (4th title)
- Runner-up: Springfield (2nd title game)

Tournament statistics
- Matches played: 1
- Goals scored: 22 (22 per match)
- Attendance: 1,227 (1,227 per match)
- Top scorer(s): Gary Reh, Adelphi (4); Jared Smith, Springfield (4)

The 1995 NCAA Division II Lacrosse Championship was the 11th annual tournament to determine the national champions of NCAA Division II men's college lacrosse in the United States.

The final, and only match of the tournament, was played at Stagg Field at Springfield College in Springfield, Massachusetts.

Adelphi defeated hosts Springfield in the championship, 12–10, to claim the Panthers' fourth Division II national title.

== Bracket ==
Championship
Adelphi	12
Springfield	10

== See also ==
- 1995 NCAA Division I Men's Lacrosse Championship
- 1995 NCAA Division I Women's Lacrosse Championship
