= 2000 NCAA Division I men's lacrosse tournament =

- Dates: May 13–29, 2000
- Teams: 12
- Finals site: Byrd Stadium; College Park, Maryland
- Champions: Syracuse (6th title)
- Runner-up: Princeton (6th title game)
- Semifinalists: Johns Hopkins (22nd Final Four); Virginia (14th Final Four)
- Winning coach: John Desko (1st title)
- MOP: Liam Banks, Syracuse
- Attendance: 22,880 finals 61,768 total
- Top scorer: Ryan Powell, Syracuse (18 goals)

The 2000 NCAA Division I lacrosse tournament was the 30th annual tournament hosted by the National Collegiate Athletic Association to determine the team champion of men's college lacrosse among its Division I programs, held at the end of the 2000 NCAA Division I men's lacrosse season.

Syracuse defeated Princeton in the final, 13–7. This marked the seventh victory in a national championship game for the Syracuse program. (Note: The seven national championships for Syracuse includes the 1990 Championship that was later vacated by the NCAA due to Infractions)

The championship game was played at Byrd Stadium at the University of Maryland in College Park, Maryland, with 24,105 fans in attendance.

== Qualifying ==
Twelve NCAA Division I college men's lacrosse teams met after having played their way through a regular season, and for some, a conference tournament.

No teams made their debut appearance in the Division I lacrosse tournament.

== Tournament bracket ==
First Round; May 13–14, 2000
Georgetown	14
8	Cornell	12
Notre Dame	15
5	Loyola Maryland	13
6	Maryland	13
Hofstra	12
7	Duke	13
Hobart	1

Quarterfinals; May 20–21, 2000
1	Syracuse	17
Georgetown	13
4	Johns Hopkins	15
Notre Dame	11
6	Maryland	7
3	Princeton	10
2	Virginia	10
7	Duke	9

Semifinals; May 27, 2000
1	Syracuse	14
4	Johns Hopkins	12
3	Princeton	12
2	Virginia	11

Final; May 29, 2000
1	Syracuse	13
3	Princeton	7

- * = Overtime

== All-Tournament Team ==
- Liam Banks, Syracuse (Named the tournament's Most Outstanding Player)
- Rob Mulligan, Syracuse
- Ryan Powell, Syracuse
- Marshall Abrams, Syracuse
- John Glatzel, Syracuse
- Josh Sims, Princeton
- Sean Hartofilis, Princeton
- Ryan Curtis, Virginia
- Conor Gill, Virginia
- A.J. Haugen, Johns Hopkins

== See also ==
- 2000 NCAA Division I women's lacrosse tournament
- 2000 NCAA Division II lacrosse tournament
- 2000 NCAA Division III men's lacrosse tournament
