= 2004 NCAA Division I men's lacrosse tournament =

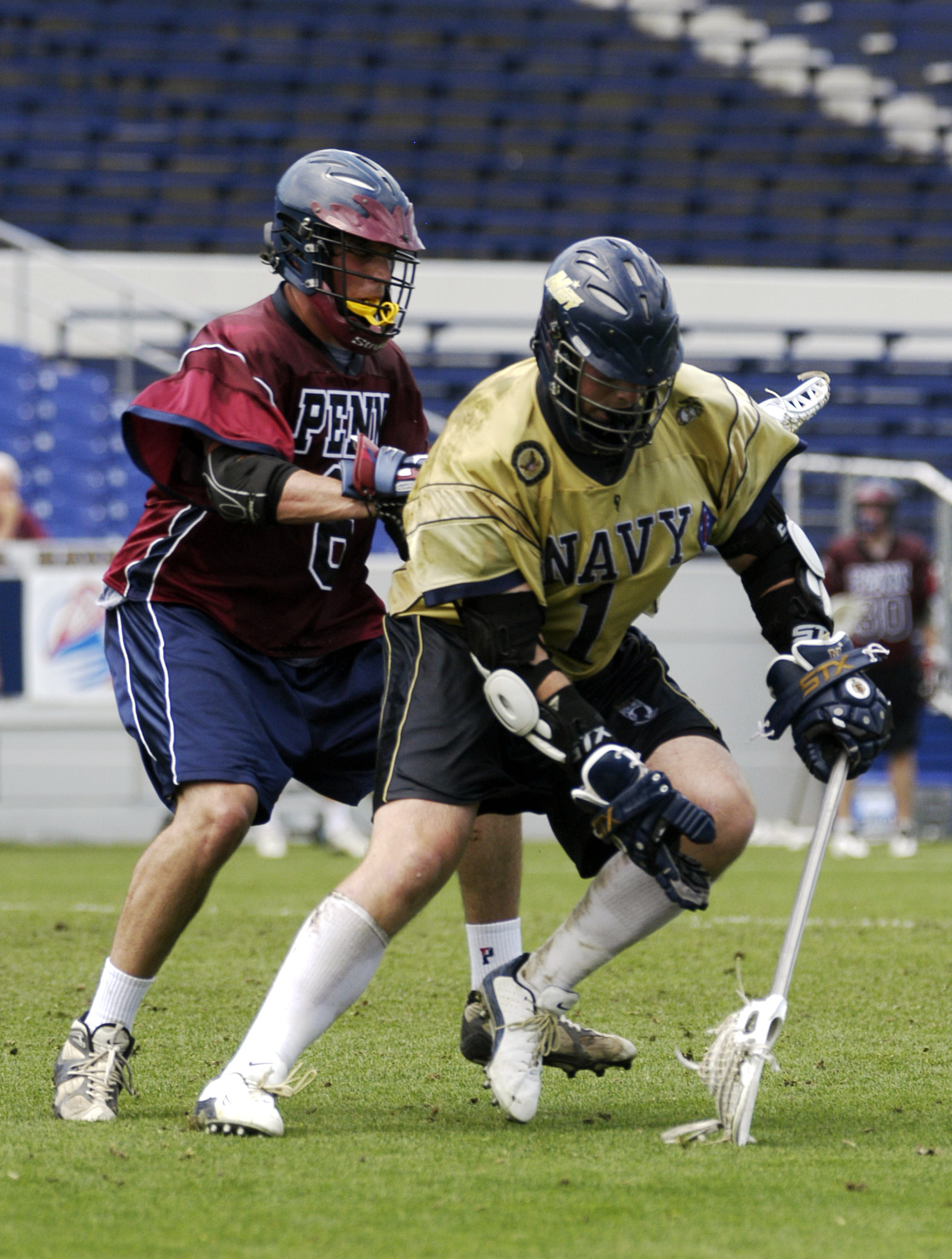
- Penn and Navy played in the first round
- Dates: May 15–31, 2004
- Teams: 16
- Finals site: M&T Bank Stadium; Baltimore, Maryland
- Champions: Syracuse (8th title)
- Runner-up: Navy (2nd title game)
- Semifinalists: Johns Hopkins (24th Final Four); Princeton (10th Final Four)
- Winning coach: John Desko (3rd title)
- MOP: Michael Powell, Syracuse
- Attendance: 46,923 semi-finals 43,898 finals 90,821 total
- Top scorer: Michael Powell, Syracuse (19 goals)

The 2004 NCAA Division I lacrosse tournament was the 34th annual tournament hosted by the National Collegiate Athletic Association to determine the team champion of men's college lacrosse among its Division I programs, held at the end of the 2004 NCAA Division I men's lacrosse season.

Syracuse won the championship with a 14–13 win over Navy. The Orange, led by senior Michael Powell, scored the game winner with one minute left in the fourth quarter, claiming their eighth national title. Powell finished the game with one goal and five assists. Syracuse outscored Navy 3–1 in the final five minutes to overcome a 12-11 fourth-quarter deficit. Navy got the ball back with 15 seconds left, but could not get a shot off.

With Syracuse's 2004 national championship win Michael Powell joins his brothers Casey and Ryan as the first set of brothers to win a national championship with the same school.

The championship game was played at M&T Bank Stadium, the home of the NFL's Baltimore Ravens, in Baltimore, Maryland in front of 43,898 fans.

== Qualifying ==
Sixteen NCAA Division I college men's lacrosse teams met after having played their way through a regular season, and for some, a conference tournament.

Providence made their debut appearance in the Division I men's lacrosse tournament.

== Bracket ==
First Round; May 15–16, 2004
1	Johns Hopkins	15
Providence	3
Ohio State	6
8	North Carolina	13
5	Georgetown	15
Towson	8
Albany	13
4	Syracuse	21
3	Maryland	16
Army	12
Rutgers	4
6	Princeton	12
7	Cornell	11
Hobart	5
Penn	5
2	Navy	11

Quarterfinals; May 22–23, 2004
1	Johns Hopkins	15
8	North Carolina	9
5	Georgetown	7
4	Syracuse	8
3	Maryland	8
6	Princeton	9*
7	Cornell	5
2	Navy	6

Semifinals; May 29, 2004
1	Johns Hopkins	9
4	Syracuse	15
6	Princeton	7
2	Navy	8

Final; May 31, 2004
4	Syracuse	14
2	Navy	13

- * = Overtime

== See also ==
- 2004 NCAA Division I women's lacrosse tournament
- 2004 NCAA Division II men's lacrosse tournament
