= 2001 NCAA Division I men's lacrosse tournament =

- Dates: May 13–29, 2001
- Teams: 12
- Finals site: Rutgers Stadium; Piscataway, New Jersey
- Champions: Princeton (6th title)
- Runner-up: Syracuse (11th title game)
- Semifinalists: Notre Dame (1st Final Four); Towson (2nd Final Four)
- Winning coach: Bill Tierney (6th title)
- MOP: B.J. Prager, Princeton
- Attendance: 21,268 finals 64,489 total
- Top scorer: Michael Powell, Syracuse (12 goals)

The 2001 NCAA Division I lacrosse tournament was the 31st annual tournament hosted by the National Collegiate Athletic Association to determine the team champion of men's college lacrosse among its Division I programs, held at the end of the 2001 NCAA Division I men's lacrosse season.

A Princeton goal with 41 seconds remaining in the first overtime period of the final lifted the second-seeded Tigers (14-1) to a 10–9 victory against top-seeded Syracuse (13-3). With the victory, Princeton earned its sixth NCAA national championship (1992, 1994, 1996, 1997, 1998) in ten years. This marked the fourth time that the Tigers had won the title game in overtime.

The victory was the 11th straight for Princeton in one-goal games, including all three of its tournament games. Most outstanding player B.J. Prager scored the game-winner, his fourth tally of the day, with 41 seconds left in the five-minute overtime period.

The championship game was played at Rutgers Stadium at Rutgers University in Piscataway, New Jersey, with 21,268 fans in attendance.

== Qualifying ==
Twelve NCAA Division I college men's lacrosse teams met after having played their way through a regular season, and for some, a conference tournament.

Bucknell made their debut appearance in the Division I men's lacrosse tournament.

== Bracket ==
First Round; May 13–14, 2001
8 | Virginia | 14
Hofstra * | 15
5 | Notre Dame | 12
Bucknell | 7
6 | Towson | 12
Duke | 10
7 | Loyola Maryland | 11
Georgetown | 9

Quarterfinals; May 20–21, 2001
1 | Syracuse | 18
Hofstra | 13
4 | Johns Hopkins | 9
5 | Notre Dame | 13
3 | Maryland | 11
6 | Towson | 12
2 | Princeton | 8
7 | Loyola Maryland | 7

Semifinals; May 27, 2001
1 | Syracuse | 12
5 | Notre Dame | 5
6 | Towson | 11
2 | Princeton | 12

Final; May 29, 2001
1 | Syracuse | 9
2 | Princeton * | 10

- * = Overtime

== See also ==
- 2001 NCAA Division I women's lacrosse tournament
- 2001 NCAA Division II men's lacrosse tournament
- 2001 NCAA Division III men's lacrosse tournament
