= Providence Friars men's lacrosse =

Providence Friars men's Lacrosse
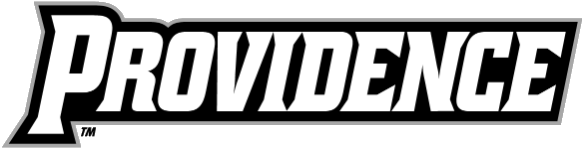
- Founded: 1980; 46 years ago
- University: Providence College
- Head coach: Bobby Benson
- Stadium: Chapey Field at Anderson Stadium (capacity: 3,000)
- Location: Providence, Rhode Island
- Conference: Big East Conference
- Nickname: Friars
- Colors: Black, white, and silver

NCAA Tournament appearances
- (3) – 2004, 2006, 2007

Conference Tournament championships
- (3) – 2004, 2006, 2007

Conference regular season championships
- (4) – 2003, 2005, 2006, 2008

The Providence Friars men's lacrosse team represents Providence College in National Collegiate Athletic Association (NCAA) Division I college lacrosse. The program was created in 1980 and plays its home games at Anderson Stadium. The Friars have competed in the Big East men's lacrosse conference since 2010, previously competing in the Metro Atlantic Athletic Conference. Through 2019, the team has an all–time record of 243-310-1.

Providence won four regular season championships and made three NCAA tournament appearances as a member of the MAAC. The Friars made their first appearance in the NCAA men's lacrosse tournament in 2004, losing in the first round to Johns Hopkins by a score of 15-3. Since joining the Big East, the program has appeared in one Big East championship game, but were defeated by conference rival Marquette 10-9 on their home field in Providence.

Every season since 2010, Providence has played Brown and Bryant for the Ocean State Cup. Providence won the Cup in 2018 and 2020.

== Season results ==
The following is a list of Providence's results by season as an NCAA Division I program:

Season	Coach	Overall	Conference	Standing	Postseason
Rod Eaton (Independent) (1980–1981)
1980	Rod Eaton	3–9			
Rod Eaton:		3–9 (.250)			
Kevin O’Donnell (Independent) (1981–1982)
1981	Kevin O’Donnell	5–6			
Kevin O’Donnell:		5–6 (.455)			
Daniel Calenda (Independent) (1982–1983)
1982	Daniel Calenda	7–3			
Daniel Calenda:		7–3 (.700)			
Steve O’Donnell (Independent) (1983–1987)
1983	Steve O’Donnell	7–2–1			
1984	Steve O’Donnell	6–5			
1985	Steve O’Donnell	10–2			
1986	Steve O’Donnell	9–3			
1987	Steve O’Donnell	7–5			
Steve O’Donnell:		39–17–1 (.693)			
Kevin Murray (Independent) (1988–1995)
1988	Kevin Murray	8–4			
1989	Kevin Murray	6–7			
1990	Kevin Murray	6–8			
1991	Kevin Murray	5–8			
1992	Kevin Murray	6–7			
1993	Kevin Murray	5–8			
1994	Kevin Murray	4–8			
1995	Kevin Murray	3–9			
Kevin Murray:		43–59 (.422)			
Bill Pymm (Metro Atlantic Athletic Conference) (1996–1998)
1996	Bill Pymm	4–11	4–3		
1997	Bill Pymm	6–9	5–3		
1998	Bill Pymm	5–9	3–4		
Bill Pymm:		15–29 (.341)	12–10 (.545)		
Chris Burdick (Metro Atlantic Athletic Conference) (1999–2009)
1999	Chris Burdick	5–10	2–6		
2000	Chris Burdick	5–10	4–5		
2001	Chris Burdick	7–9	5–4		
2002	Chris Burdick	9–7	5–2		
2003	Chris Burdick	7–9	7–1	T–1st	
2004	Chris Burdick	9–8	6–2		NCAA Division I First Round
2005	Chris Burdick	8–8	7–1	1st	
2006	Chris Burdick	10–7	6–2	T–1st	NCAA Division I First Round
2007	Chris Burdick	7–10	5–3	T–2nd	NCAA Division I First Round
2008	Chris Burdick	7–8	7–1	T–1st	
2009	Chris Burdick	6–10	5–3	T–2nd	
Chris Burdick (Big East Conference) (2010–2012)
2010	Chris Burdick	0–14	0–6	7th	
2011	Chris Burdick	3–12	0–6	7th	
2012	Chris Burdick	2–12	1–5	T–6th	
Chris Burdick:		85–134 (.388)	60–47 (.561)		
Chris Gabrielli (Big East Conference) (2013–2022)
2013	Chris Gabrielli	8–8	1–5	6th	
2014	Chris Gabrielli	4–11	1–5	T–6th	
2015	Chris Gabrielli	5–9	1–4	T–4th	
2016	Chris Gabrielli	7–9	1–4	T–4th	
2017	Chris Gabrielli	10–7	3–2	3rd	
2018	Chris Gabrielli	5–10	1–4	5th	
2019	Chris Gabrielli	7–9	3–2	T–2nd	
2020	Chris Gabrielli	5–1	0–0	†	†
2021	Chris Gabrielli	4–9	3–7	T–4th	
2022	Chris Gabrielli	6–8	1–4	5th	
Chris Gabrielli:		61–81 (.430)	16–37 (.302)		
Bobby Benson (Big East Conference) (2023–Present)
2023	Bobby Benson	6–9	2–3	4th	
2024	Bobby Benson	7–8	3–2	3rd	
2025	Bobby Benson	7–8	3–2	3rd	
2026	Bobby Benson	5–8	1–2		
Bobby Benson:		25–33 (.431)	9–9 (.500)		
Total:		283–371–1 (.433)			
National champion Postseason invitational champion Conference regular season champion Conference regular season and conference tournament champion Division regular season champion Division regular season and conference tournament champion Conference tournament champion

†NCAA canceled 2020 collegiate activities due to the COVID-19 virus.
