= Providence Friars =

Athletics program of Providence College

- University: Providence College
- NCAA: Division I
- Conference: Big East (primary); Hockey East
- Athletic director: Steven Napolillo
- Location: Providence, Rhode Island
- Varsity teams: 16 (7 men's 10 women's)
- Basketball arena: Amica Mutual Pavilion
- Ice hockey arena: Schneider Arena
- Softball stadium: Glay Field
- Soccer stadium: Chapey Field at Anderson Stadium
- Aquatics center: Taylor Natatorium
- Lacrosse stadium: Chapey Field at Anderson Stadium
- Outdoor track and field venue: Ray Treacy Track at Hendricken Field
- Other venues: Alumni Hall
- Colors: Black, white, and silver
- Mascot: Friar Dom, Huxley
- Fight song: When the Friars Go Marching In (since the 1950s); "Friar Away" (original)
- Website: friars.com
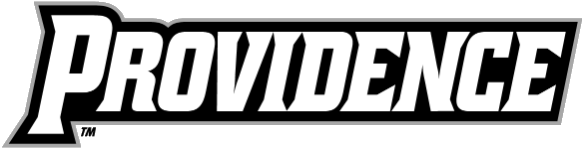

Team NCAA championships
- 3

The Providence Friars are the intercollegiate athletic teams that represent Providence College, located in Providence, Rhode Island. They compete in the Big East Conference (NCAA Division I) for every sport except for ice hockey, where they compete in Hockey East. The Big East Conference was founded in 1979 by former athletic director and men's basketball coach Dave Gavitt. On December 15, 2012, Providence and the other seven Catholic, non-FBS schools announced that they were departing the Big East for a new conference; on March 7, 2013, it was officially confirmed that Providence's new conference would operate under the Big East name. The women's volleyball team, which had been an associate member of the America East Conference before the Big East split, remained in that conference for one more season before joining the Big East for the 2014 season.

The school's men's and women's sports teams are called the Friars, after the Dominican Order that runs the school. They are the only collegiate team to use the name.

Overall, the program consists of 17 varsity sports, seven for men and ten for women: men's and women's basketball, men's and women's cross country, field hockey, men's and women's ice hockey, men's lacrosse, men's and women's soccer, softball, men's and women's swimming and diving, women's tennis, men's and women's track and field, and women's volleyball. The lacrosse team competed in the Metro Atlantic Athletic Conference through the 2009 season before joining the newly created Big East lacrosse league for 2010.

Former sports include football, which was offered from 1921 until World War II in 1941, and baseball, which was dropped due to Title IX in 1999. Other dropped sports include men's tennis and men's golf, the latter of which will be reinstated in 2025–26. Women's golf will be added for the first time in 2025–26.

The school's biggest rivals are Boston University and Boston College in hockey and UConn and URI (Ocean State Rivalry) in the school's other sports, especially in soccer, swimming and diving, and basketball.

== Teams ==
| Men's sports | Women's sports |
|---|---|
| Basketball | Basketball |
| Cross country | Cross country |
| Golf (in 2025–26) | Field hockey |
| Ice hockey | Golf (in 2025–26) |
| Lacrosse | Ice hockey |
| Soccer | Soccer |
| Swimming & diving | Softball |
| Track & field^{†} | Swimming & diving |
| | Tennis |
| | Track & field^{†} |
| | Volleyball |
† – Track and field includes both indoor and outdoor.

The Big East logo in Providence's colors

=== Discontinued sports ===
==== Football ====
Providence College had a varsity football program from 1921 to 1941.

==== Baseball ====
The Friars fielded a varsity baseball team from 1923 to 1999. They won the Big East Conference baseball tournament in 1992 and 1999. They reached the NCAA Division I baseball tournament nine times: 1962, 1968, 1970, 1972, 1973, 1974, 1992, 1995, 1999.

In October of 1998, school president Rev. Philip A. Smith announced that baseball (alongside men's golf and tennis) would be discontinued "in order to comply with gender equity and proportionality strictures" as set by Title IX regulations. Charlie Hickey was the last coach for the Friars. The last game in Providence at Hendricken Field was on May 15, 1999 against Villanova, which the Friars won 7–4. Their final game was on May 30 against Florida State in the NCAA Tournament with a 14–3 loss. In 2024, Providence College started fielding a club team in baseball in Division II of the National Club Baseball Association.

== NCAA team championships ==
Providence has won 3 NCAA team national championships.

- Women's (2)
  - Cross Country (2): 1995, 2013
- Men's (1)
  - Ice Hockey (1): 2015
- see also:
  - Big East Conference NCAA team championships
  - List of NCAA schools with the most NCAA Division I championships

== Colors, mascot and fight songs ==
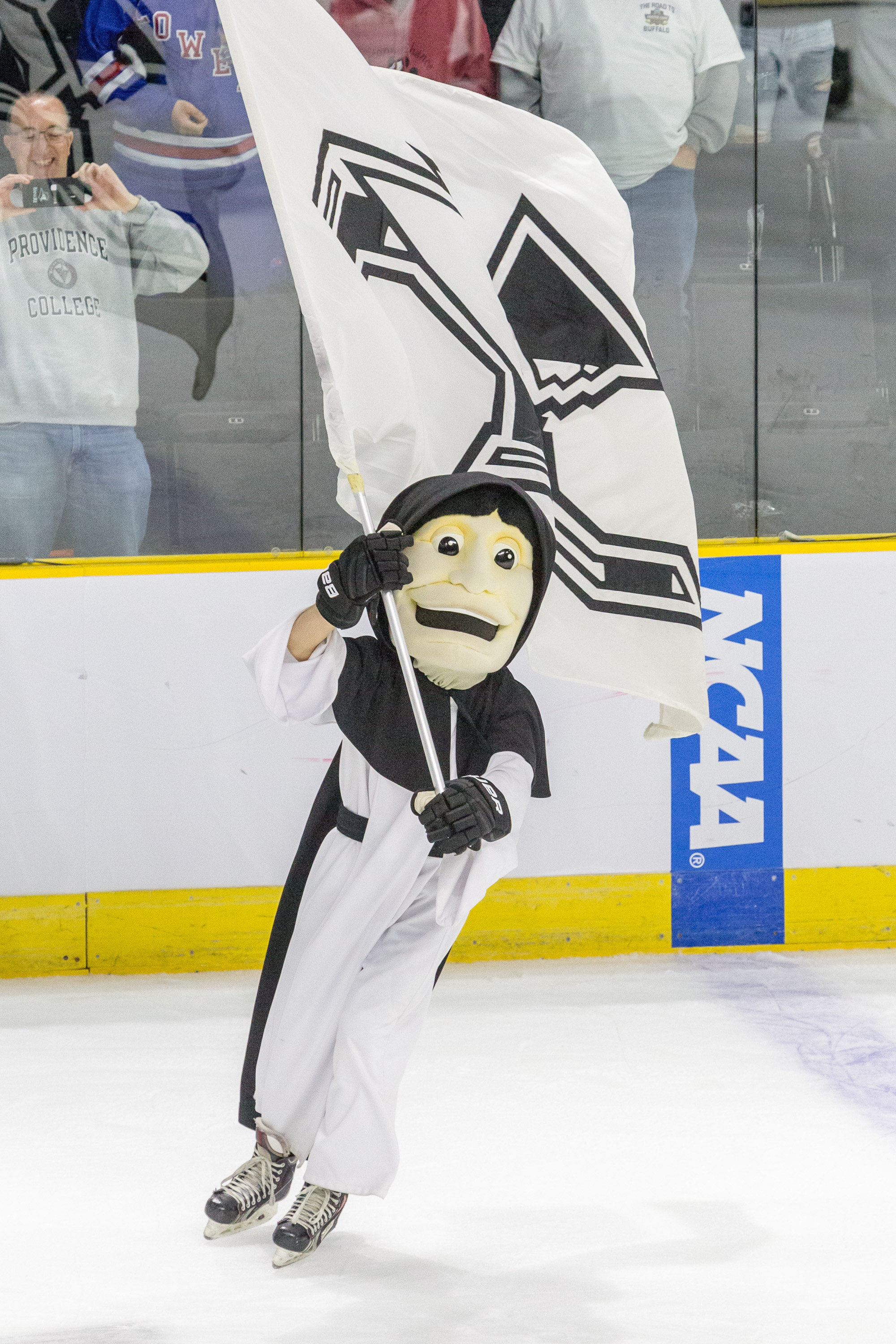
Friar Dom on skates

The Dominicans' use of black and white as the colors of their habits were passed on from the earliest days at Providence College as the school colors. Through the years, various highlight colors have come and gone, including yellow, red and gold; the current highlight color of silver dates to the introduction of the current logo in 2002. The current logo shows a cowled Friar in profile. It is used by all teams except the hockey teams, who have used the "Skating Friar" logo since 1973.

The nickname "Friars" dates back to 1929, when a Providence Journal article used the nickname in reference to the baseball team. Previously, the teams were variously known as "The Black and White" or "Dominicans." The Friars nickname comes from the short-form nickname of the Dominican Order, the "Blackfriars." There have been several versions of the Friar Dom mascot throughout the years, with the most recent dating to the 2000s. In 2017 the Friars reintroduced a costumed dalmatian mascot as a companion to Friar Dom; a prior version had existed in the late 1990s. Both are based on the traditional dalmatian mascot of both the college and the Dominican Order in general; dalmatians have been called "the watchdogs of the Lord." The most recent live dalmatian mascot on campus was Friar Boy V, who died in 2004.

The original Friars fight song was "Friar Away." However, in the 1950s, WPRO, the radio station that still carries Friar basketball games to this day, began using "When The Saints Go Marching In" as the theme music to their coverage of PC basketball games. The fans took to it so well that it has become the fight song of the college, with Friar Away slipping into obscurity, other than a brief attempted revival in the 1990s.

== Facilities ==
All teams compete on campus except for the men's basketball team who play at the Amica Mutual Pavilion in Downtown Providence, Rhode Island (however on rare occasions, the women's basketball team has also played "home" games at the Amica Mutual Pavilion, most notably for games against the University of Rhode Island (URI) in the Ocean State Rivalry or the University of Connecticut (UConn), where demand for tickets would be enough to warrant an arena larger than the 1,854-seat on-campus Alumni Hall). The men's and women's swimming and diving teams home practice and competition pool is Taylor Natatorium, located in the Peterson Recreation Center adjacent to Alumni Hall. The men’s and women’s cross country teams home course is the Mark Coogan Cross Country Course at Highland Park in Attleboro, Massachusetts.

Providence Friars on-campus athletic facilities locations
Locations of the sports at the on-campus athletics facilities used by the Providence Friars athletic teams, 2021-2022 Alumni Hall, Schneider Arena, Tennis Courts, Glay Field , Chapey Field at Anderson Stadium, Lennon Family Field , Ray Treacy Track at Hendricken Field , and Taylor Natatorium . M = Men's W = Women's
Providence Frairs off-campus athletic facilities locations
Locations of the sports at the off-campus athletics facilities used by the Providence Frairs athletic teams, 2021-2022 Slavin Center (Campus Center), Amica Mutual Pavilion, and Mark Coogan Cross Country Course at Highland Park. M = Men's W = Women's
