= 2023 NCAA Division II men's lacrosse tournament =

College lacrosse tournament in Philadelphia

2023 NCAA Division II Men's Lacrosse Championship
Tournament information
- Sport: College lacrosse
- Location: United States
- Dates: May 10, 2023–May 28, 2023
- Venue(s): Championship; Lincoln Financial Field; Philadelphia, PA; Other games Campus sites
- Participants: 12

Final positions
- Champions: Lenoir-Rhyne (1st title)
- Runner-up: Mercyhurst

The 2023 NCAA Division II Men's Lacrosse tournament was the 38th annual single-elimination tournament to determine the national champion of NCAA Division II men's college lacrosse.

The championship game was played on May 28, 2023, at Lincoln Financial Field in Philadelphia, Pennsylvania. All other games were played at the campus of the higher-seeded team in the matchup.

Lenoir-Rhyne defeated Mercyhurst in the final, 20–5, to win their first national championship.

== Qualification ==
All Division II men's lacrosse programs were eligible for invitation into the tournament. Unlike the Division I and Division III tournaments, there are no automatic-qualifiers for winning their conference, and each of the 12 teams are selected via committee invitation with six teams from the North region and six from the South region.

North Region
Seed	Team	Record
1	Le Moyne	14-0
2	Mercyhurst	12-2
3	Mercy	12-3
4	Bently	9-4
5	Adelphi	15-2
6	St Anselm	9-3

South Region
Seed	Team	Record
1	Rollins	15-1
2	Limestone	13-4
3	Wingate	12-2
4	Tampa	13-3
5	Lenoir-Rhyne	14-2
6	UIndy	11-2

== Bracket ==
First Round; Campus Sites
4	Bentley	8
5	Adelphi	9
3	Mercy	16
6	St. Anselm	17
4	Tampa	9
5	Lenoir-Rhyne	10
3	Wingate	10
6	UIndy	11

Quarter-Finals; Campus Sites
1	Le Moyne	11
5	Adelphi	7
2	Mercyhurst	10
6	St. Anselm	9
1	Rollins	8
5	Lenoir-Rhyne	14
2	Limestone	11
6	UIndy	10

Semi-Finals; Campus Sites
1	Le Moyne	10
2	Mercyhurst	11
5	Lenoir-Rhyne	18
2	Limestone	11

National Championship; Lincoln Financial Field; Philadelphia, PA
2	Mercyhurst	5
5	Lenoir-Rhyne	20

== Boxscores ==
=== National Championship ===
Team	1	2	3	4	Total
Mercyhurst	0	1	4	0	5
Lenoir-Rhyne	6	8	4	2	20
