= 1999 NCAA Division I men's lacrosse tournament =

- Dates: May 15–31, 1999
- Teams: 12
- Finals site: Byrd Stadium; College Park, Maryland
- Champions: Virginia (2nd title)
- Runner-up: Syracuse (9th title game)
- Semifinalists: Georgetown (1st Final Four); Johns Hopkins (21st Final Four)
- Winning coach: Dom Starsia (1st title)
- MOP: Conor Gill, Virginia
- Attendance: 24,135 finals 70,668 total
- Top scorers: John Grant Jr., Delaware; Ryan Powell, Syracuse (14 goals)

The 1999 NCAA Division I lacrosse tournament was the 29th annual tournament hosted by the National Collegiate Athletic Association to determine the team champion of men's college lacrosse among its Division I programs, held at the end of the 1999 NCAA Division I men's lacrosse season.

Virginia and held off Syracuse, the number eight seed, in the final, 12–10. This was Virginia's first NCAA title since 1972 and fourth overall, including two pre-NCAA tournament Wingate Trophies in 1952 and 1970.

The championship game was played at Byrd Stadium at the University of Maryland in College Park, Maryland, with 24,135 fans in attendance.

== Summary ==
Virginia's Conor Gill was named the most outstanding player of the tournament, the first freshman ever to win that honor. Other notable players included Virginia's Jay Jalbert, Syracuse's Ryan Powell, and Delaware's player of the year, John Grant, Jr.

Grant, Jr. led the Delaware Blue Hens to a number six national ranking and their first ever tournament win. Grant Jr. was the tournament's leading scorer along with Ryan Powell, with 14 points in just two games.

Up until this final, Virginia had lost its last three championship game appearances in overtime. While the Cavaliers built a 9–3 lead by the third quarter, Syracuse still made it close, scoring five unanswered goals to climb back to within 10–9 with 6:30 left. Syracuse became the first number eight seed to make it to the title game.

The All-Tournament Team included Conor Gill, Derek Kenney, Ryan Curtis, Jay Jalbert, Court Weisleder, Tucker Radebaugh, Marshall Abrams, Ryan Powell, Dan Denihan and Georgetown's Scott Urick.

== Qualifying ==
Twelve NCAA Division I college men's lacrosse teams met after having played their way through a regular season, and for some, a conference tournament.

No teams made their debut appearance in the Division I lacrosse tournament.

== Bracket ==
First Round; May 15–16, 1999
8	Syracuse	7
Princeton	5
5	Georgetown	14
Notre Dame	10
6	Delaware	12^{(i)}
UMBC	11
7	Hofstra	15
Navy	7

Quarterfinals; May 22–23, 1999
1	Loyola Maryland	12
8	Syracuse	17
4	Duke	14
5	Georgetown	17
3	Virginia	17
6	Delaware	10
2	Johns Hopkins	11
7	Hofstra	7

Semifinals; May 29, 1999
8	Syracuse	13
5	Georgetown	10
3	Virginia	16
2	Johns Hopkins	11

Final; May 31, 1999
8	Syracuse	10
3	Virginia	12

- ^{(i)} one overtime

== Box scores ==
=== Finals ===
==== #3 Virginia vs. #8 Syracuse ====
Team	1	2	3	4	Total
Virginia	5	3	1	3	12
Syracuse	2	1	1	6	10
Virginia scoring – Hanley Holcomb 3, Drew McKnight 2, Michael Leahy 2, Henry Oakey 2, Jay Jalbert, Tucker Radebaugh, Conor Gill; Syracuse scoring – Ryan Powell 2, Matt Cutia 2, Tim Byrnes 2, Brian Solliday, Liam Banks, Josh Coffman, Jeff Cordisco; Shots: Syracuse 46, Virginia 33; Saves: Virginia Derek Kenney 12, Syracuse Rob Mulligan 11; Attendance: 24,135

=== Semifinals ===
==== #5 Georgetown vs. #8 Syracuse ====
Team	1	2	3	4	Total
Syracuse	2	3	6	2	13
Georgetown	4	1	0	4	9
Syracuse scoring – Tim Byrnes 2, Chris Cordisco 2, Matt Cutia 2, Jeff Lowe 2, Matt Alexander 1, Sam Bassett 1, Matt Caione 1, Ryan Powell 1, Brian Solliday 1; Georgetown scoring – Scott Urick 3, Andy Flick 2, Greg Haubschmann, Mike Henehan, Mike Kanach, Greg McCavera; Shots: Georgetown 46, Syracuse 43; Saves: Syracuse Rob Mulligan 16, Georgetown Brian Hole 11; Attendance: 27,586

==== #2 Johns Hopkins vs. #3 Virginia ====
Team	1	2	3	4	Total
Virginia	3	2	3	5	16
Johns Hopkins	5	2	4	2	11
Virginia scoring – Conor Gill 5, Jay Jalbert 3, Tucker Radebaugh 2, Hanley Holcomb, David Baruch, Michael Leahy, Aaron Vercollone, David Bruce, Jamie Leachman; Johns Hopkins scoring - Dan Denihan 5, A.J. Haugen 2, Matt O’Kelly 1, Dave Rabuano 1, Dylan Schlott 1, Justin Shaberly 1.; Shots: Johns Hopkins 45, Virginia 37; Saves: Virginia Derek Kenney 15, Johns Hopkins Brian Carcaterra 11; Attendance: 27,586

=== Quarterfinals ===
==== #1 Loyola Maryland vs. #8 Syracuse ====
Team	1	2	3	4	Total
Syracuse	3	4	5	5	17
Loyola Maryland	4	2	3	3	12
Syracuse scoring – Matt Cutia 4, Chris Cordisco 3, Liam Banks 2, Tim Byrnes 2, Matt; Caione 2, Josh Coffman 2, Devin Darcangelo 1, Brian Solliday 1: Loyola Maryland scoring – Gewas Schindler 4, Mike Battista 2, Mark Frye 2, Tim Goettelmann 2, Peter Haas 1, Todd Vizcarrondo 1; Shots: Syracuse 44, Loyola Maryland 29; Saves: Syracuse Rob Mulligan 11, Loyola Maryland Jim Brown 11; Attendance (May 23): 6,533

==== #4 Duke vs. #5 Georgetown ====
Team	1	2	3	4	Total
Georgetown	4	4	4	5	17
Duke	3	4	2	5	14
Georgetown scoring – Greg McCavera 4, Andy Flick 3, Tyler Gamble 3, Mike Henehan 3, Scott Urick 2, Steve Dusseau 1, Brett Wagner 1; Duke scoring – Adam Dretler 3, Jared Frood 2, Nick Hartofilis 2, Brendan Keaney 2, Scott Diggs 1, TJ Durnan 1, Chris Kakel 1, John O’Donnell 1, Greg Patchak 1; Shots: Duke 46, Georgetown 40; Saves: Georgetown Brian Hole 17 - Duke Matt Breslin 14; Attendance (May 22): 12,289

==== #3 Virginia vs. #6 Delaware ====
Team	1	2	3	4	Total
Virginia	2	6	5	4	17
Delaware	4	3	2	1	10
Virginia scoring – Jay Jalbert 4, Drew McKnight 4, Tucker Radebaugh 4, David Baruch 2, Hanley Holcomb 2, Josh Broadstreet 1; Delaware scoring – John Grant Jr. 4, Sean Carney 2, Jim Bruder 1, Dennis DeBusschere 1, Jason Lavey 1, Kevin Lavey 1; Shots: Delaware 43, Virginia 41; Saves: Virginia Derek Kenney 13 - Delaware Ron Jedlicka 11; Attendance (May 23): 6,533

==== #2 Johns Hopkins vs. #7 Hofstra ====
Team	1	2	3	4	Total
Johns Hopkins	3	1	3	4	11
Hofstra	2	2	1	2	7
Johns Hopkins scoring – Dan Denihan 4, AJ Haugen 3, Dylan Schlott 2, Conor Denihan 1, Justin Shaberly 1; Hofstra scoring – Doug Shanahan 2, Chad Eisenhart 1, Joe Ghedina 1, Tom Kessler 1, Brad Obloj 1, Jacob Rogers 1; Shots: Johns Hopkins 37, Hofstra 37; Saves: Johns Hopkins Brian Carcaterra 16 - Hofstra Michael Demeo 15; Attendance (May 22): 12,289

=== First round ===
==== #8 Syracuse vs. Princeton ====
Team	1	2	3	4	Total
Syracuse	2	1	3	1	7
Princeton	2	2	0	1	5
Syracuse scoring – Liam Banks 2, Matt Caione 1, Josh Coffman 1, Chris Cordisco 1, Matt Cutia 1, Ryan Powell 1; Princeton scoring – Lorne Smith 3, BJ Prager 1, Rob Torti 1; Shots: Princeton 40, Syracuse 30; Saves: Syracuse Rob Mulligan 16, Lee Hine 3, Pat McCabe 1 - Princeton Corey Popham 9; Attendance (May 15): 5,727

==== #5 Georgetown vs. Notre Dame ====
Team	1	2	3	4	Total
Georgetown	4	3	3	4	14
Notre Dame	3	4	0	3	10
Georgetown scoring – Andy Flick 4, Mike Henehan 3, Tyler Gamble 2, Scott Doyle 1, Steve Dusseau 1, Greg McCavera 1, Scott Urick 1, Brett Wagner 1; Notre Dame scoring – Brad Owen 3, Chris Dusseau 2, Tom Glatzel 2, Steve Bishko 1, John Flandina 1, Todd Ulrich 1; Shots: Georgetown 39, Notre Dame 35; Saves: Georgetown Brian Hole 15 - Notre Dame Kirk Howell 13; Attendance (May 16): 4,103

==== #6 Delaware vs. UMBC ====
Team	1	2	3	4	OT1	Total
Delaware	2	1	2	6	1	12
UMBC	1	3	5	2	0	11
Delaware scoring – John Grant Jr. 3, Jason Lavey 3, Kevin Lavey 3, Sean Carney 2, Dennis DeBusschere 1; UMBC scoring - Casey Hard 2, Dan Marohl 2, Eric Barger 1, Mark Cornes 1, Josh Hahn 1, John Harasym 1, Jeffrey Ratcliffe 1, Scott Steele 1, Chris Turner 1; Shots: UMBC 44, Delaware 43; Saves: UMBC Andrew Hampson 16, Delaware Ron Jedlicka 11; Attendance (May 16): 4,103

==== #7 Hofstra vs. Navy ====
Team	1	2	3	4	Total
Hofstra	3	6	3	3	15
Navy	1	0	3	3	7
Hofstra scoring – Scott Dooley 3, Joe Kostolansky 2, Michael Laurano 2, Rob Parrinelli 2, Joe Barile 1, Chad Eisenhart 1, Tom Kessler 1, Brad Obloj 1, Jacob Rogers 1, Chris Rogler 1; Navy scoring – J.L. Reppert 3, Alex Borcz 1, Ed McKinnon 1, Kevin Meehan 1, Jamie O’Leary 1; Shots: Hofstra 37, Navy 31; Saves: Navy Mickey Jarboe 15 - Hofstra Michael Demeo 10; Attendance (May 15): 5,727

== All-Tournament Team ==
- Conor Gill, Virginia (Named the tournament's Most Outstanding Player)
- Derek Kenney, Virginia
- Ryan Curtis, Virginia
- Jay Jalbert, Virginia
- Court Weisleder, Virginia
- Tucker Radebaugh, Virginia
- Marshall Abrams, Syracuse
- Ryan Powell, Syracuse
- Dan Denihan, Johns Hopkins
- Scott Urick, Georgetown

== Leading scorers ==
Leading Scorers
Name	GP	G	A	Pts
John Grant, Jr., Delaware	2	7	7	14
Ryan Powell, Syracuse	4	4	10	14
Matt Cutia, Syracuse	4	9	4	13
Andy Flick, Georgetown	3	9	4	13
Conor Gill, Virginia	3	6	6	12
Jay Jalbert, Virginia	3	8	4	12
Tucker Radebaugh, Virginia	3	7	5	12
Drew McKnight, Virginia	3	6	5	11
Dan Denihan, Johns Hopkins	2	9	2	11
Mike Henehan, Georgetown	3	7	4	11
Greg McCavera, Georgetown	3	6	5	11

== See also ==
- 1999 NCAA Division I women's lacrosse tournament
- 1999 NCAA Division II lacrosse tournament
- 1999 NCAA Division III men's lacrosse tournament
