= Maverik Lacrosse =

Manufacturer of lacrosse equipment and apparel

Maverik Lacrosse, Inc.
- Type: Subsidiary
- Industry: Sporting goods
- Founded: 2005
- Founders: John Gagliardi and Jay Jalbert
- Headquarters: New York City, New York
- Area served: United States
- Products: Apparel, Sports equipment
- Parent: Bauer Performance Sports Ltd.
- Website: cascademaverik.com

Maverik Lacrosse manufactures lacrosse equipment and apparel, based in New York City. The company was founded by professional lacrosse players John Gagliardi and Jay Jalbert.

Maverik Lacrosse was acquired on June 3, 2010, by Private Equity group Kohlberg & Co. for an undisclosed sum.

== History ==
Maverick was founded in 2005 by professional lacrosse player John Gagliardi.

In 2010, Kohlberg Sports Group brought Maverik, Bauer, and Mission Roller Hockey together as one entity under the name, Bauer Performance Sports Ld. In January 2011, Bauer Performance Sports Ltd went public.

In October 2016, Performance Sports Group filed for bankruptcy. In January 2017, PSG reached an agreement with Sagard Capital Partners and Fairfax Financial Holdings Ltd to sell its assets for $575 million, including Maverik.

== Partnership ==
In 2020, Maverik teamed up with the US Lacrosse and the National Teams Program to offer gear to athletes. The company has also joined the University of Maryland, College Park men's lacrosse team.
