= Nick Carlson =

Canadian lacrosse player

Personal information
- Nationality: Canadian
- Born: May 19, 1980 (age 46) Lantzville, British Columbia, Canada
- Height: 6 ft 0 in (183 cm)
- Weight: 196 lb (89 kg; 14 st 0 lb)

Sport
- Position: Forward
- Shoots: Left
- NLL draft: 5th overall, 2002; New York Saints
- NLL teams: Colorado Mammoth; New York Saints
- Pro career: 2003-2012 and 2014–

Nick Carlson (born May 19, 1980) is a Canadian former box lacrosse player for the Colorado Mammoth in the National Lacrosse League.

Carlson was born in the small town of Lantzville, British Columbia, and grew up playing box lacrosse in the Nanaimo Minor Lacrosse Association. He was not introduced to outdoor lacrosse until his junior year of high school.

Carlson played college lacrosse at Limestone University in Gaffney, South Carolina, where he helped the Saints win the 2000 NCAA Division II tournament. As a sophomore in 2001, he earned Deep South Conference Player of the Year honors after setting program records for points in a season (83) and goals in a game (10).

During the 2009 NLL season, he was named a reserve to the All-Star game.

== National team career ==
During his freshman year of college, Carlson was called up to the Canada men's junior national team ahead of the 1999 Under-19 World Lacrosse Championships held in Australia. He earned a silver medal as Canada lost to the United States in the final.

== Statistics ==
=== NLL ===
| | | Regular Season | | | | | | Playoffs |
| Season | Team | GP | G | A | Pts | LB | PIM | GP | G | A | Pts | LB | PIM |
|---|---|---|---|---|---|---|---|---|---|---|---|---|---|
| 2003 | New York | 12 | 5 | 9 | 14 | 44 | 24 | -- | -- | -- | -- | -- | -- |
| 2004 | Colorado | 12 | 2 | 9 | 11 | 50 | 12 | -- | -- | -- | -- | -- | -- |
| 2005 | Colorado | 16 | 6 | 12 | 18 | 61 | 38 | 1 | 0 | 3 | 3 | 1 | 2 |
| 2006 | Colorado | 16 | 14 | 15 | 29 | 56 | 51 | 3 | 2 | 4 | 6 | 14 | 10 |
| 2007 | Colorado | 8 | 3 | 4 | 7 | 23 | 12 | 1 | 0 | 2 | 2 | 0 | 2 |
| 2008 | Colorado | 16 | 8 | 7 | 15 | 58 | 23 | 1 | 1 | 2 | 3 | 8 | 0 |
| 2009 | Colorado | 16 | 4 | 14 | 18 | 83 | 20 | 1 | 0 | 0 | 0 | 5 | 4 |
| NLL totals | | 96 | 42 | 70 | 112 | 375 | 180 | 7 | 3 | 11 | 14 | 28 | 18 |
