= Justin Dean =

American baseball player (born 1996)

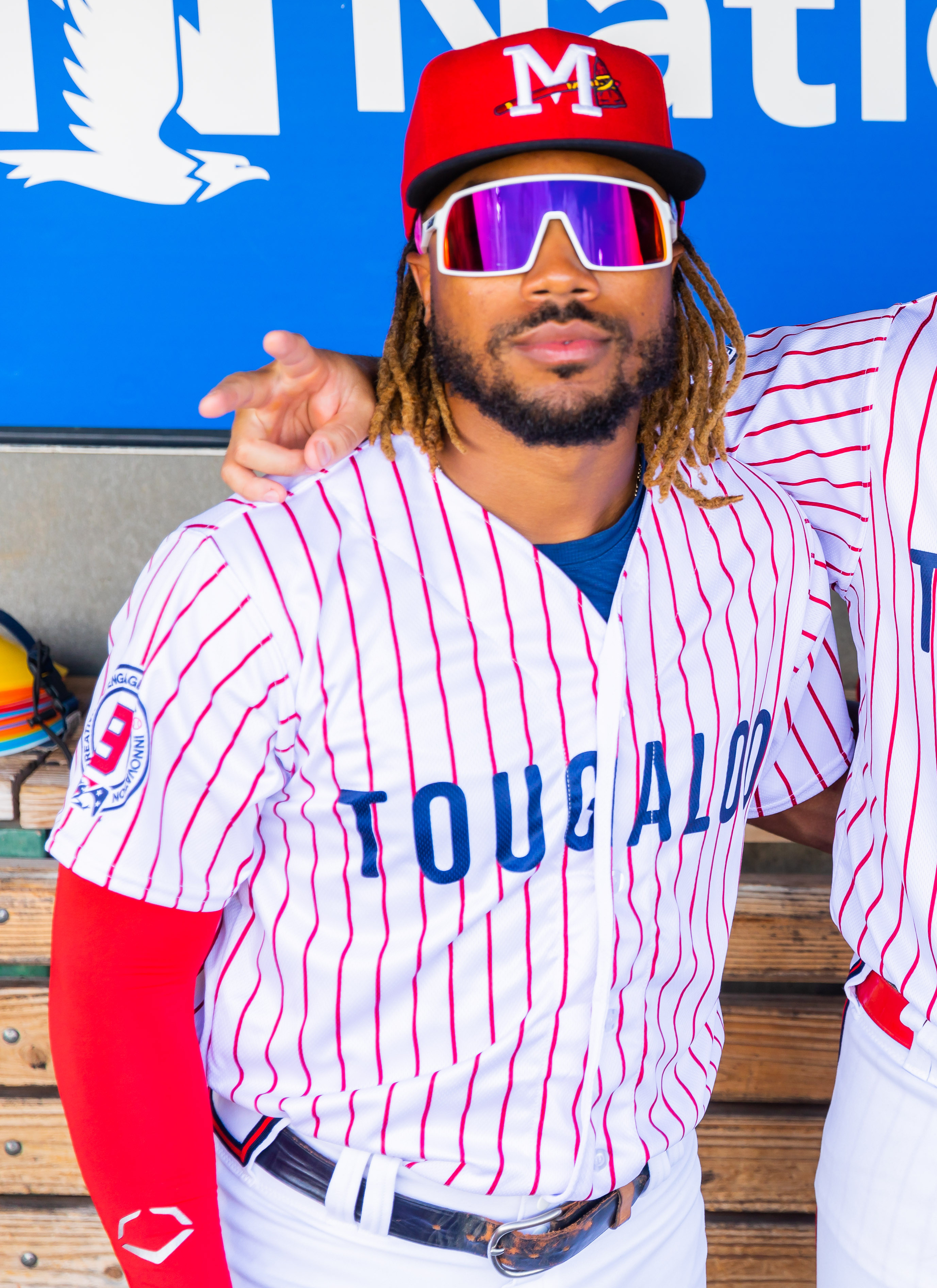
- Dean with the Mississippi Braves in 2022

Chicago Cubs – No. 1
- Outfielder
- Born: December 6, 1996 (age 29); Mauldin, South Carolina, U.S.
- Bats: Right Throws: Right

MLB debut
- August 8, 2025, for the Los Angeles Dodgers

MLB statistics (through 2026 season)
- Batting average: .300
- Home runs: 0
- Runs batted in: 3
- Stats at Baseball Reference

Teams
- Los Angeles Dodgers (2025); Chicago Cubs (2026–present)

Career highlights and awards
- World Series champion (2025)

Justin Emmanuel Dean (born December 6, 1996) is an American professional baseball outfielder for the Chicago Cubs of Major League Baseball (MLB). He has previously played in MLB for the Los Angeles Dodgers, with whom he made his MLB debut with in 2025.

== Career ==
=== Amateur career ===
Dean attended Mauldin High School in South Carolina and played college baseball for the Lenoir–Rhyne Bears. He was named to the 2018 ABCA/Rawlings NCAA Division II All-Southeast Region Second Team, after hitting .398 with 59 runs scored, 119 total bases and a .640 slugging percentage.

=== Atlanta Braves ===
The Atlanta Braves selected Dean in the 17th round of the 2018 MLB draft and he signed for a $125,000 bonus. He played in 60 professional games that season, split between rookie-level Danville Braves and Single-A Rome Braves, with a .284 batting average.

Dean spent all of the 2019 season with Rome, playing in 109 games, batting .284 with nine home runs, 46 runs batted In (RBI) and 47 stolen bases. He did not play in a game in 2020 due to the cancellation of the minor league season because of the COVID-19 pandemic.

The Braves promoted Dean to the Double-A Mississippi Braves for the 2021 season, where he hit .237 in 99 games and stole 29 bases. After the season, he played for two teams in the Mexican Pacific League. In 2022, he began the season in Triple-A with the Gwinnett Stripers but he hit just .204 in 19 games and was demoted back to Mississippi on May 3. He finished the season there, hitting .320 in 75 games and stealing 19 bases. After another off-season in Mexico, he was invited to major league spring training by the Braves in 2023. He did not make the club and split the 2023 season between Mississippi and Gwinnett, playing in 117 games with a slash line of a .139 batting average, .339 on base percentage and .304 slugging percentage. In 2024, he again split the season between the same two affiliates, slashing .247/.338/.321 while stealing 47 bases. Dean elected free agency following the season on November 4, 2024.

=== Los Angeles Dodgers ===
Dean signed a minor league contract with the Los Angeles Dodgers on December 15, 2024. He was invited to major league spring training and was assigned to the Triple-A Oklahoma City Comets to start the 2025 season, where he played in 90 games and slashed .289/.378/.395 with six home runs, 33 RBI, and 27 stolen bases. On August 8, he was selected to the 40-man roster and promoted to the major leagues for the first time. Dean made his MLB debut that night as a defensive replacement against the Toronto Blue Jays. He played in 18 games for the Dodgers and was used exclusively as a late-game defensive replacement and pinch runner, recording only two at-bats (a strikeout and a groundout). Dean was later included on the Dodgers postseason roster, appearing in 13 games as a defensive replacement as the Dodgers reached the 2025 World Series and won the series in seven games. He scored one run as a pinch runner in the Division Series but did not have a plate appearance in the postseason. Dean was outrighted to the minors by the Dodgers on November 6 and removed from the 40-man roster.

=== Chicago Cubs ===
On November 6, 2025, Dean was claimed off waivers by the San Francisco Giants. He was designated for assignment on January 6, 2026, following the signing of Tyler Mahle. On January 13, Dean was claimed off waivers by the Chicago Cubs. He was optioned to the Triple-A Iowa Cubs to begin the regular season.
