= Le Moyne Dolphins =

Intercollegiate sports teams of Le Moyne College

- University: Le Moyne College
- Nickname: Dolphins
- NCAA: Division I
- Conference: NEC
- Athletic director: Phil Brown
- Location: DeWitt, New York (Mailing address: Syracuse, New York)
- Varsity teams: 21 (22 in 2026–27)
- Basketball arena: Ted Grant Court in the Le Moyne Events Center
- Baseball stadium: Dick Rockwell Field
- Softball stadium: Softball Complex
- Soccer stadium: Ted Grant Field
- Aquatics center: Vincent B. Ryan, S.J.
- Lacrosse stadium: Ted Grant Field
- Colors: Green and gold
- Website: lemoynedolphins.com
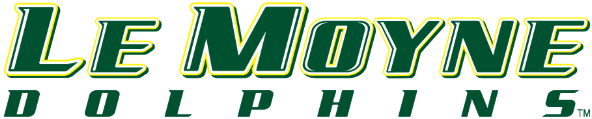

The Le Moyne Dolphins are the athletic teams that represent Le Moyne College, located in DeWitt, New York, in NCAA Division I intercollegiate sporting competitions. The Dolphins compete as members of the NEC (historically known as the Northeast Conference). Le Moyne had been a member of the NCAA Division II Northeast-10 Conference since 1996. Following the 2022–23 academic year, Le Moyne began the transition to NCAA Division I as a new member of the NEC.

== Name origin ==
As early as the second century, Christians associated the dolphin with love and tenderness. A dolphin appears on the seal of the Bishop of Syracuse, just as it was on the seal of the ancient See of Siracusa. Le Moyne named its teams the Dolphins to encourage students to look to the future, because the dolphin is a sign of comfort and union and fraternal charity. The dolphin is a constant reminder that Le Moyne is steeped in centuries-old tradition and philosophy.

== Conference affiliation history ==
Northeast Conference logo in Le Moyne colors

The Dolphins' primary conference affiliations, i.e. the conferences in which the men's basketball team competed, are shown in the table below.

First season	Final season	Conference
1950–51		Eastern Catholic Intercollegiate Athletic Conference
1955–56	1975–76	Middle Eastern College Athletic Association
1983–84	1990–91	Mideast Collegiate Conference
1992–93	1995–96	New England Collegiate Conference
1996–97	2022–23	Northeast-10 Conference
2023–24	2026-27	NEC
2027–28	future	Metro Conference

== Varsity teams ==
=== List of teams ===
Men's sports	Women's sports
Baseball	Basketball
Basketball	Bowling (starting in 2026–27)
Cross country	Cross country
Golf	Golf
Lacrosse	Lacrosse
Soccer	Soccer
Swimming & diving	Softball
Tennis	Swimming & diving
Track & field^{†}	Tennis
	Track and field^{†}
	Volleyball
† – Track and field includes both indoor and outdoor.

==== Men's basketball ====
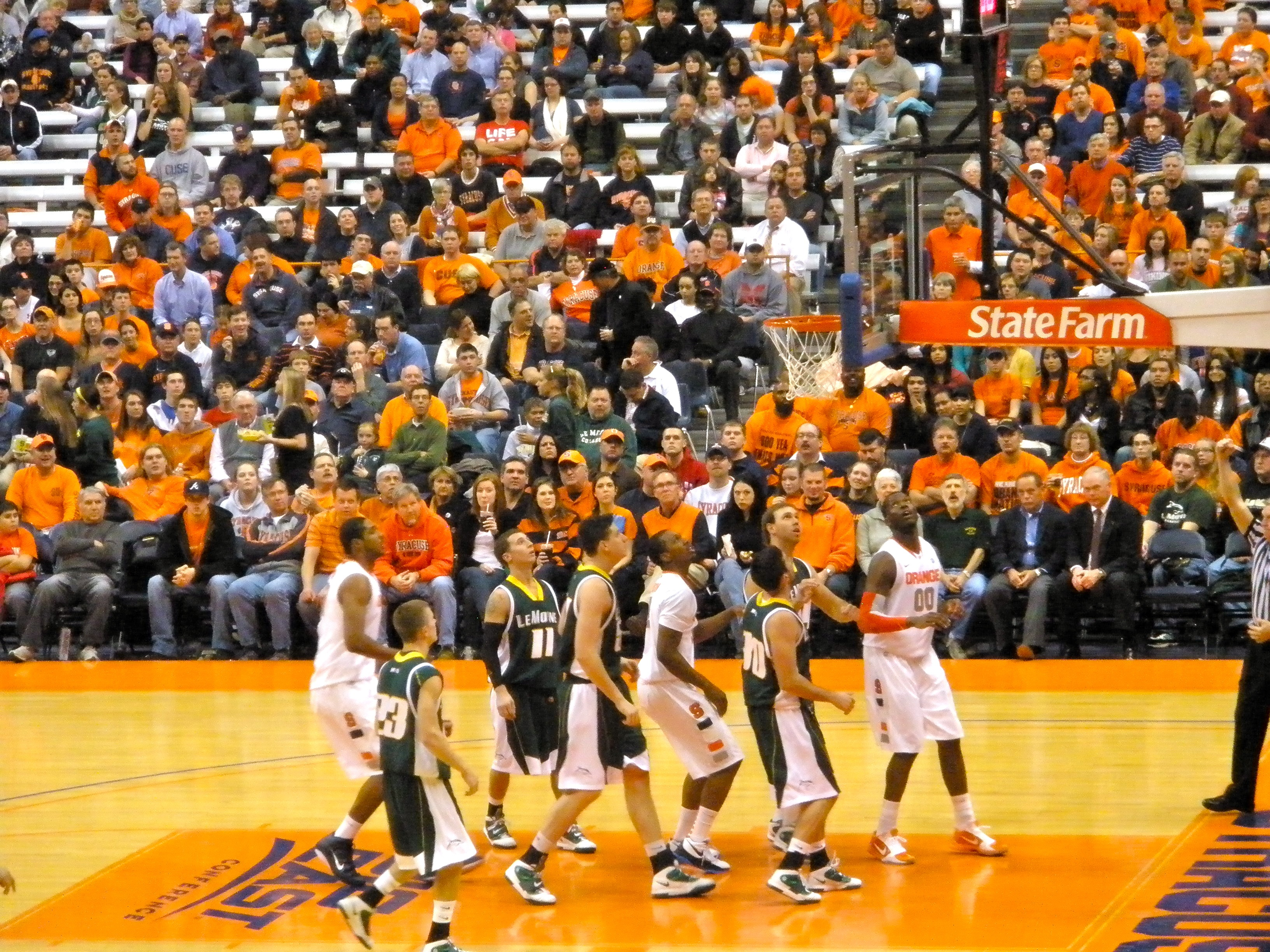
Le Moyne (in dark jerseys) v Syracuse game in 2010

In 1960, the men's basketball team won the Middle Eastern College Athletic Association Tournament, which was hosted by Saint Peter's College at the Jersey City Armory. Consolation games other than the third-place game were played at the Saint Peter's gym. In the tournament, Le Moyne defeated Saint Peter's, Iona and Long Island to win.

5th place
December 29 at Saint Peter's
St. Francis (NY)	95
Saint Peter's	108
7th place
December 29 at Saint Peter's
Siena	70
Wagner	68

5th–8th place Semifinals
December 28 at Saint Peter's
St. Francis (NY)	62
Siena	50
December 28 at Saint Peter's
Wagner	65
Saint Peter's	74

Quarterfinals
December 27 at the Armory
Fairleigh Dickinson	93
St. Francis (NY)	58
December 27 at the Armory
Long Island	58
Siena	55
December 27 at the Armory
Iona	61
Wagner	53
December 27 at the Armory
Saint Peter's	62
Le Moyne	64

Semifinals
December 28 at the Armory
Fairleigh Dickinson	50
Long Island	70
December 28 at the Armory
Iona	60
Le Moyne	90

Final
December 29 at the Armory
Long Island	57
Le Moyne	66
3rd place
December 29 at the Armory
Iona	58
Fairleigh Dickinson	77

The Le Moyne men's basketball team gained national attention when it defeated Division I powerhouse Syracuse 82–79 in a November 2009 exhibition game.

==== Women's basketball ====
Le Moyne had a women's basketball team in the eight-team City League, which called itself the Le Moyne College Girls' Basketball Team, during the 1958–59 season. The team won three of its first four games, and the effort was led by senior Barbara Wood, chairman of the Le Moyne women's athletic association. Lynn Eisenhauer was also a member of the team.

On January 9, 1960, the team defeated the Hancock Field Women's Air Force team, 42–25, at the West Jefferson Street Armory in the opener of a doubleheader that also featured the men's team against Clarkson. Sue McCann led Le Moyne with 20 points, while Patty Sue Young and Joanne Pospeich added 10 each.

Le Moyne participated in the Women's Recreation Basketball League during the 1960–61 season.

During the 1961–62 academic year, Le Moyne's women's athletic association organized women's basketball as an intramural sport. Four teams competed in the intramural league: the Seven-Ups, captained by Nan Hurtubise, the Four Freshmen, co-captained by Rose Van Epps and Madeline Welch, the Mufki-Pufkis, captained by Nancy Allen and the Sound Offs led by captain Patty Sue Young. The teams played a six-game schedule, meeting each of the other three teams twice. Games were played on Mondays at the Charles Andrews School. The Seven-Ups were the league champions, and trophies were presented to the winning team members: Nancy Dillon, Rita Ruane, Betty Graf, Emily Hodapp and Rita Amyott. Pat Resch was named most valuable player. Martha del Vecchio won the most improved player award. Rose Van Epps was honored as the most sportsmanlike player. Ruane was elected president of the women's athletic association for the 1962–63 academic year.

Intercollegiate women's varsity basketball was revived at Le Moyne in December 1962. The initial team members were Pat Resch, Carol Collins, Claire Cunnion, Rita Ruane, Dale Amend, Barbara Schlaerth, Nancy Dillon and Bernadette Baecher. Elizabeth Schuchman joined the team before its first game, which was at the Le Moyne Athletic Center against Auburn Community College on February 9, 1963. Led by head coach Sue Gibbons, the Dolphinettes, as they were called, won that opening game, 33–26. Nancy Dillon and Dale Amend led the way with 12 points each. The Dolphinettes also earned a road win against Auburn Community, 48–46, in overtime. Bernie Baecher had 18 points in that game, and Amend added 17. The Dolphinettes dominated Nazareth, 48–6. Le Moyne did not allow a field goal in the game. Freshman Donna Argenbright led the way with 13 points, and Baecher added 11. The Dolphinettes outscored the Syracuse Orangewomen in a mid-season scrimmage. Le Moyne completed their perfect season with a 4–0 record, when they beat Cazenovia, 36–14, on March 16. Amend led the way with 17 points, and Baecher added 11 in the season finale.

Women's basketball was played primarily as an intramural sport at Le Moyne during the 1963–64 academic year. However, a varsity team, captained by Bernadette Baecher, was selected from the intramural players and hosted a Syracuse intramural team in March 1964, but the Dolphinettes were defeated by the Orange. The Le Moyne women's athletic association organized basketball as an intramural sport during the 1964–65 academic year as well.

In fall 1968, plans were announced to field a women's varsity basketball team for the 1968–69 season. However, it is unclear whether this took place. Women's intramural basketball was planned for the 1970–71 academic year. There was hope that enough interest would be expressed to form a varsity team. Cathy Coughlin was the student who took the lead on organizing women's basketball. In November 1970, it was announced that women's intramural and intercollegiate basketball competition would begin in the spring 1971 semester. Tryouts for the women's varsity team were scheduled for December 14, 1970. Games were scheduled against Onondaga Community College, Nazareth and Oswego State. In February 1971, Onondaga Community College was replaced on the schedule by Cazenovia. The Dolphinettes improved their record to 2–0 with a 35–24 win over Oswego State. Patty McCarthy scored 16 points to top Le Moyne's scoring list for the second straight game. A road game at Syracuse was scheduled for March 11.

Le Moyne played five intercollegiate games in the 1971–72 season and finished with an 0–5 record.

An eight-game varsity schedule was planned for the 1972–73 season. The team opened on January 18, 1973, with a 40–31 victory over Cazenovia, led by the hot shooting of Sue Mellie, the strong rebounding of Eileen Brewer and the guard play of Mary Jo Muellner. The second game on the schedule was a home matinee against Siena on January 27, with the men's teams meeting that same evening. Facing a tough zone defense, the Lady Dolphins started 0 for 10 from the floor but still managed to take an early 8–2 lead, after Mellie heated up. Despite a rebounding edge, Le Moyne could not penetrate Siena's zone and were called for 20 fouls compared with only 11 charged to the Indians. The Lady Dolphins fell, 25–23. Mellie scored 16 points to lead the Dolphinettes to a 37–35 road win at Cazenovia on February 1. Beth Ackley's defense sparked a Le Moyne comeback that erased a 10-point deficit and built an eight-point Dolphinettes lead. Le Moyne survived a late Cazenovia run to hold on for the two-point victory. The Dolphinettes fell to 2–2 on the season after suffering a 42–25 home loss to Syracuse on February 3, in which their new uniforms debuted. Previously, the women's team had played in tee-shirts and gym shorts. The Dolphinettes had a game scheduled for February 15 at Syracuse.

Efforts were made to organize a women's varsity basketball team for the 1973–74 season, with tryouts held on November 13.

More than 100 women played intramural basketball at Le Moyne during the 1974–75 academic year.

Le Moyne launched its women's varsity basketball program in earnest during the 1975–76 season, opening with a home game on February 10, 1976, against Nazareth. The Dolphins were coached by Le Moyne athletic director Tommy Niland, who retired as the head coach of the men's team three years earlier after 25 years at the helm. Niland said he wanted to coach the team to get a first-hand look at women's athletics to help him formulate future commitments the school should make to women's sports. The Guppies, as they were called by the student newspaper, fell to Nazareth, 53–28. Wendy Archinald had 10 points and eight blocked shots for Le Moyne.

Official statistics for Dolphins women's basketball only go back to the 1976–77 season.

Stacy Schrader, then a junior, recorded the first triple-double in program history on January 19, 2002. She scored 12 points, grabbed 10 rebounds and blocked 10 shots in the Dolphins' 60–54 home victory over Franklin Pierce. The 10 blocked shots set a new program record, which she broke, when she had 13 in a November 2002 game.

Le Moyne's women's basketball team nearly pulled a shocker before falling to Syracuse 73–70 in an exhibition game at the JMA Wireless Dome on November 3, 2022.

==== Baseball ====
After much success in Division II, Le Moyne's baseball team reclassified to Division I in the fall of 1987. The Dolphins rallied in the ninth inning to win their first game as a Division I team, 8–5, at Binghamton on September 10, 1987. Pete Stoyan's single in the final frame drove in the winning run. The Dolphins dropped the second game of the season-opening doubleheader, 4–3.

==== Lacrosse ====
Le Moyne has long been a lacrosse power at the Division II level, earning seven men's and women's national championships in the sport. The Dolphins' men's lacrosse team captured its sixth national crown in 2021, under the leadership of head coach Dan Sheehan. Le Moyne registered its lone women's lacrosse national title in 2018.

== Athletic facilities ==
The Thomas J. Niland Athletic Complex houses Le Moyne College's athletic teams, visiting competitors, and coaches. Student-athletes use outdoor facilities including the Dick Rockwell Field for baseball, tennis courts, a softball complex and other fields including Ted Grant Field, completed in 2010, an athletic turf complex for lacrosse and soccer. The Niland Complex includes the Henninger Athletic Center, where basketball games and other events take place on Ted Grant Court.

The complex also includes Dick Rockwell Field, Le Moyne's baseball field named for the school's former baseball coach and athletic director. The field was named after Rockwell on September 26, 1998, shortly after he was named chairman of the NCAA Division I baseball committee.

The campus also has trails behind the school that are used by the cross country team for their home meets and other teams to train on.

== National championships ==
=== Team ===
Association	Division	Sport	Year	Opponent	Score
NCAA	Division II	Men's Lacrosse	2004	Limestone	11–10^{2OT}
NCAA	Division II	Men's Lacrosse	2006	Dowling	12–5
NCAA	Division II	Men's Lacrosse	2007	Mercyhurst	6–5
NCAA	Division II	Men's Lacrosse	2013	Mercyhurst	11–10
NCAA	Division II	Men's Lacrosse	2016	Limestone	8–4
NCAA	Division II	Men's Lacrosse	2021	Lenoir-Rhyne	12–6
NCAA	Division II	Women's Lacrosse	2018	Florida Southern	16–11

=== Individual ===
Association	Division	Sport	Year	Individual(s)	Event
NCAA	Division II	Women's Swimming and Diving	2008	Alison Lesher	200-yard Butterfly

== First plan to move to Division I ==
On September 15, 1997, Le Moyne announced it would begin the process of reclassification to Division I by applying for membership in the Metro Atlantic Athletic Conference (MAAC). Tom O'Neil, the college's treasurer and vice president of finance, estimated the move to the MAAC would cost approximately $800,000 over the following three years. In October, the board of trustees approved the decision to apply for membership in the MAAC and transition to Division I athletics. However, the MAAC added new members Marist and Rider in 1997, and did not have amy plans for further expansion at that time. In early 2000, Le Moyne athletic director Dick Rockwell said the school would not transition to Division I as an independent and would remain in Division II, until a Division I home conference was found.

In February 2003, Le Moyne announced that its plan to move to Division I had been abandoned. Despite the travel burdens, Dick Rockwell noted that the Northeast-10 Conference was extremely competitive and the top rated academic conference in Division II. The majority of its schools had mission statements similar to that of Le Moyne. Vice-president of student development Shawn L. Ward noted that new NCAA rules requiring a transitional period before full Division I membership could be attained coupled with the MAAC's lack of interest in expansion made it unlikely Le Moyne would leave Division II. MAAC commissioner Richard J. Ensor confirmed that the league had not recently discussed expansion and that there would be no interest in adding a new member that was not already a Division I institution. A transition to Division I as an independent would have been an arduous journey for Le Moyne, and there would have been no guarantee of MAAC membership at the end of that road. Rockwell estimated the annual cost increase to be competitive in Division I to be $2.5 million compared with the athletic department's then current Division II budget. In addition, Ward noted some of Le Moyne's facilities would need to be upgraded in order to meet Division I standards.

== Athletic directors ==
Tommy Niland, namesake of the school's athletic complex, was Le Moyne's first athletics director and is the most significant figure in the college's athletics history. He was the first head coach of the freshman basketball team starting in the 1947–48 season, Le Moyne's initial academic year during which all students at the school were freshmen. Niland also coached Le Moyne's varsity basketball team from its inaugural season in 1948–49 until 1973, winning 326 games and going to seven NCAA College Division tournaments. He was also Le Moyne's first varsity baseball coach. After his varsity basketball coaching career ended, Niland remained in his position as Le Moyne's athletics director until his retirement in 1990. Niland also served on various NCAA regional and national committees, including the infractions committee that imposed the death penalty on Southern Methodist University's football program in 1987. Niland's membership on the committee was criticized by the Dallas media, one member of which wrote, "My only suggestion to the NCAA is only people from big-time programs should sit in judgement of big-time cheaters. What could the Le Moyne AD possibly know about downtown Dallas bag men and the going price for high school running backs in Texas?"

Dick Rockwell, a graduate of Ithaca College, won 757 baseball games on the Heights between 1968 and 1996 at the Division I and II levels, going to the Division II national tournament 12 of their last 13 seasons in the division, and becoming a power in the Metro Atlantic Athletic Conference in Division I. Rockwell also served as Le Moyne athletic director from 1990 to 2007.

On December 2, 2006, Le Moyne announced that Matt Bassett would become the school's third athletic director on July 1, 2007, following the retirement of Dick Rockwell. Bassett had most recently been senior associate director of athletics at Binghamton. Bassett was 47 years old at the time of his hiring and had also previously worked as a graduate assistant for Syracuse Orange men's basketball and as a basketball coach or administrator at Quinnipiac and Green Mountain. Binghamton and Quinnipiac had transitioned to Division I while Bassett was there, and Bassett played a role in fundraising for Binghamton's new basketball arena.

Following a long career in senior administration at the West Point, Bob Beretta was named director of athletics on January 7, 2021. He is only the fourth director of athletics in the college's history. Beretta led Le Moyne through initiation of the process of reclassifying from Division II to Division I. On June 4, 2024, Beretta resigned to become the athletics director at his alma mater, St. Bonaventure. Beretta's resignation was effective June 21, and the college planned to name an interim director, as the search for a permanent replacement was conducted.

Mike Lindberg, a Le Moyne alumnus from the class of 1979, became the Dolphins' interim athletic director on June 20, 2024. Lindberg previously served as the athletic director at Wells College in Aurora, New York from 2014 to 2023. During his tenure, Wells installed a state of the art multi-purpose turf field. Along with the improvement in facilities, Lindberg also saw the Express win a few North Eastern Athletic Conference (renamed the United East Conference in 2021) titles. Previously, he was the associate director of intercollegiate athletics at Ithaca College from 1998 to 2013, where he was a part of various conference championship and NCAA Division III national championship teams.

Phil Brown became Le Moyne's new assistant vice president of athletics on January 1, 2025. Brown had overseen facilities and event management, capital projects and equipment staff at Vanderbilt from 2015 to 2024. Prior to his time at Vanderbilt, Brown was an assistant athletic director at Texas A&M–Kingsville. Brown has a bachelor's degree in accounting from Houston and a master's in business administration from Texas A&M–Commerce. He also has a master's degree in sports management from Georgia Southern and is a graduate of the Sport Management Institute Executive Programs conducted at Michigan and Texas.

== Athletic registration rate ==
More than 75 percent of students are estimated to participate in some form of athletics at Le Moyne. Le Moyne student-athletes have combined to post term cumulative grade-point averages of at least 3.0 in 42 consecutive semesters dating back to 2003 (through spring 2024). Dolphin student-athletes routinely combine for term GPAs of at least 3.3 in addition to completing more than 2,500 hours of community service each year as part of The Le Moyne Way program.

== Club and intramural sports ==
The Thomas J. Niland Athletic Complex incorporates a 47,000-square-foot (4,400 m^{2}) facility with a 25-yard (23 m) competition-size swimming pool, fitness center and weight room, a three-court size multi-purpose gym area, an elevated jogging track, and four racquetball courts. It is designed primarily for intramural, recreational use, and personal fitness activities. Students can also use fitness centers which are located in several of the residence halls.

The college participates in thirteen sports on the club level: men's ice hockey, men's lacrosse, women's lacrosse, women's field hockey, women's basketball, men's rugby, women's rugby, equestrian, fencing, rowing, ultimate frisbee, sailing, and Tae Kwon Do, in addition to cheerleading, with both men and women on the squad. All club teams are given qualified coaches, practice facilities and uniforms.

The college conducts an extensive intramural program with sports and competitors that vary each year. The program usually includes: basketball (men's and women's leagues); flag football (men); indoor soccer (men's, women's and coed leagues); walleyball (coed); racquetball tournaments (coed, men's and women's divisions); volleyball (coed); softball (men's and women's leagues); and inner tube water polo (coed).

== Notable alumni ==
- Isaiah Eisendorf (2016–2018)
- Josiah Gray (2016–2018)
- Jim Wessinger (1974–1976)
- Jim Deshaies (1979–1982)
- Tom Browning (1979–1981)
- Peter Hoy (1986–1988)
- Jon Ratliff (1991–1993)
- Scott Cassidy (1996–1998)
- Andy Parrino (2005–2007)
- Don Savage (1947–1951)
