= Lenoir–Rhyne Bears =

- University: Lenoir–Rhyne University
- Nickname: Bears
- NCAA: Division II
- Conference: South Atlantic (primary)
- Athletic director: Daron Montgomery
- Location: Hickory, North Carolina
- Varsity teams: 22 (10 men's, 11 women's, 1 co-ed)
- Football stadium: Helen & Leonard Moretz Stadium
- Basketball arena: Shuford Arena
- Baseball stadium: Durham Field
- Softball stadium: Bears Field
- Soccer stadium: Soccer Field at Moretz Sports Athletic Campus
- Aquatics center: Shuford Pool
- Tennis venue: YMCA of Catawba Valley
- Colors: Cardinal and Black
- Mascot: Joe and Josie Bear
- Website: lrbears.com

The Lenoir–Rhyne Bears are the athletic teams that represent Lenoir–Rhyne University, located in Hickory, North Carolina, in intercollegiate sports at the Division II level of the National Collegiate Athletic Association (NCAA). The Bears have primarily competed in the South Atlantic Conference since the 1989–90 academic year.

Lenoir–Rhyne competes in 23 intercollegiate varsity sports. Men's sports include baseball, basketball, cross country, football, golf, lacrosse, soccer, swimming, tennis, and track and field (indoor and outdoor); while women's sports include basketball, cross country, golf, lacrosse, soccer, softball, swimming, tennis, track and field (indoor and outdoor), triathlon, and volleyball.

== Conference affiliations ==
- South Atlantic Conference (1989–present)

== Sports sponsored ==
Men's sports	Women's sports
Baseball	Basketball
Basketball	Cross country
Cross country	Golf
Football	Lacrosse
Golf	Soccer
Lacrosse	Softball
Soccer	Swimming
Swimming	Tennis
Tennis	Track and field^{1}
Track and field^{1}	Triathlon
	Volleyball
^{1} – includes both indoor and outdoor

=== Baseball ===
Lenoir–Rhyne has had 10 Major League Baseball draft selections since the draft began in 1965.

Year	Player	Round	Team
1981	Craig Corbett	10	Expos
1991	Steven Davis	31	Cubs
1991	Michael Tidwell	25	Cubs
1999	Ralph Roberts	36	Devil Rays
2000	Ralph Roberts	32	Diamondbacks
2000	Samuel Hewitt	28	Athletics
2003	Brad Nelson	10	Braves
2017	John Curtis	10	Braves
2018	Justin Dean	17	Braves
2024	Zach Evans	9	Padres

=== Football ===
On December 10, 1960, the Lenoir–Rhyne football team defeated Humboldt State 15–14 in the NAIA football national championship.

=== Men's Lacrosse ===
On May 28, 2023, the Lenoir–Rhyne men's lacrosse team defeated Mercyhurst 20-5 in the NCAA Division II national championship.

== Championships ==
=== Team national championships ===
Lenoir–Rhyne was won two team national championships.

Sport	Association	Division	Year	Opponent/Runner-Up	Score
Men's lacrosse (1)	NCAA	Division II	2023	Mercyhurst	20–5
Football (1)	NAIA	Single	1960	Humboldt State	15–14

== Notable alumni ==
=== Baseball ===
- Justin Dean
- Don Padgett
- Herm Starrette

=== Football ===
- Kyle Dugger
- Perry Fewell
- Craig Keith
- Tommy Laurendine
- John Milem
- Mike Pope
- Dareke Young

=== Men's basketball ===
- Rick Barnes
- Eddie Holbrook
- Will Perry

=== Men's soccer ===
- Oriol Cortes
- Cameron Saul
- Aaron Wheeler
