= Stagg Field (Springfield College) =

Stadium in Springfield, Massachusetts, USA

Coordinates: 42.105498°N 72.553867°W

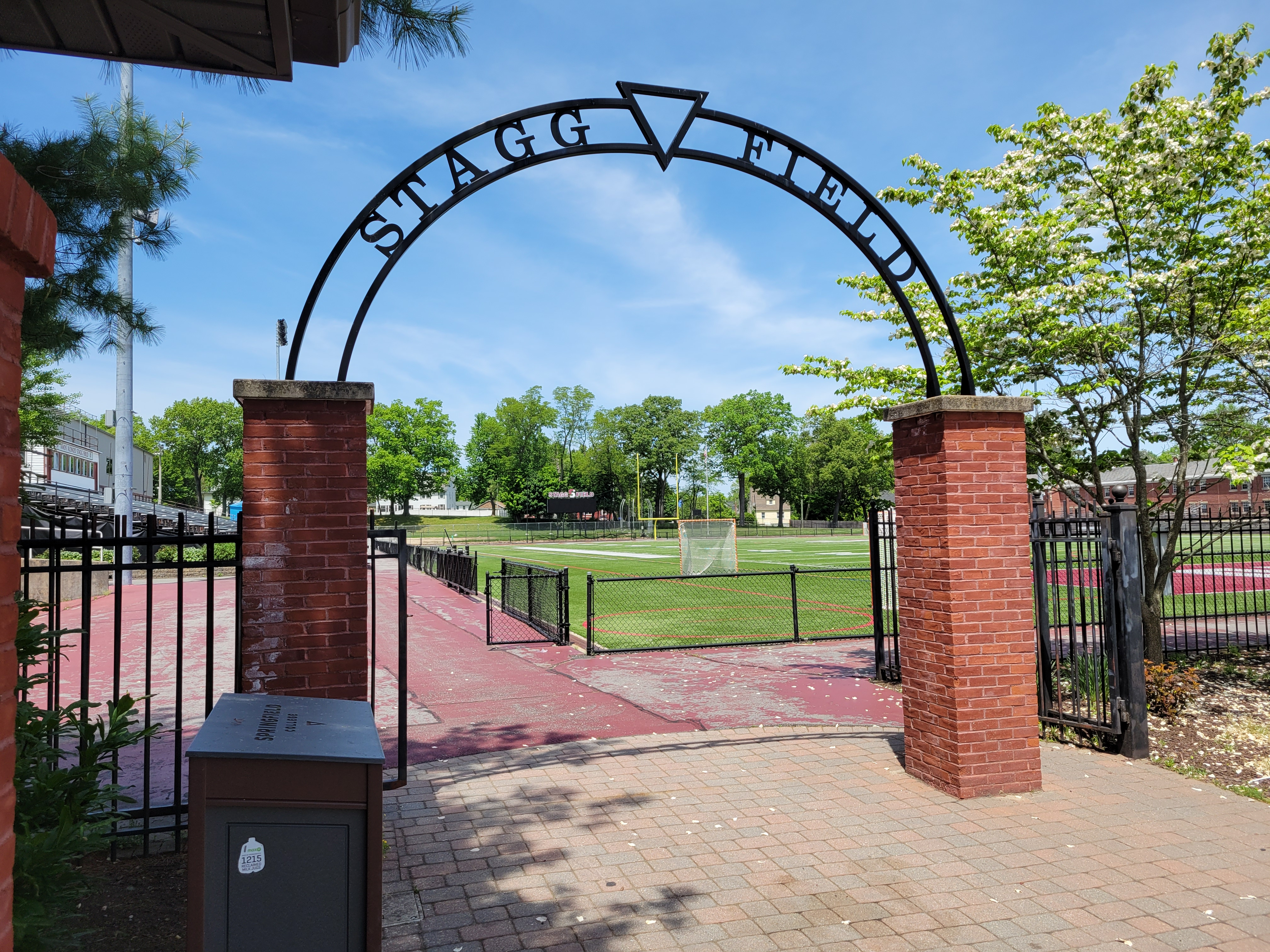
- Entrance to the venue as seen in 2024
- Interactive map of Stagg Field
- Full name: Amos Alonzo Stagg Field
- Former names: Benedum Field (1971–2007)
- Address: Springfield, MA; United States
- Owner: Springfield College
- Operator: Springfield College Athletics
- Capacity: 3,867
- Type: Stadium
- Surface: Artificial turf
- Current use: American football Lacrosse; Field hockey

Construction
- Opened: 1971; 55 years ago

Tenants
- Springfield Pride (NCAA) teams: football; women's field hockey; men's and women's lacrosse

Website
- springfieldcollegepride.com/stagg-field

Stagg Field is a stadium on the campus of Springfield College in Springfield, Massachusetts. With bleacher seating for 3,867, is it the home field for Springfield College's football, field hockey, and men's and women's lacrosse team. It is also used for physical education classes and intramural sports. The Springfield College men's and women's soccer teams formerly played on the field, before moving to Brock-Affleck Field.

Featuring the first AstroTurf surface in the nation to be installed on a college playing field, it is plowable and used year-round. The field is lighted according to National Collegiate Athletic Association (NCAA) standards for night games and has a heated and air conditioned press box.

The field open in 1971 as "Benedum Field" in honour of Paul G. Benedum, a businessman who served as a member of the Springfield College Board of Trusteese in the 1960s. It was renamed in October 2007 in honor of Amos Alonzo Stagg, who came to Springfield College—then known as then known as International YMCA Training School—and initiated the school's football program. The field was resurfaced with "monofilament FieldTurf" during the summer of 2007.

Stagg Field stands on the site of the college's previous athletics stadium, Pratt Field.

== Events hosted ==
- 1984 NCAA Division I field hockey tournament
- 1989 NCAA Division I field hockey tournament
- 1995 NCAA Division II lacrosse tournament
