= Conor Gill =

American lacrosse player (born 1980)

Personal information
- Nickname: G-Man
- Nationality: American
- Born: February 6, 1980 (age 45) Lutherville, Maryland, U.S.
- Height: 6 ft 2 in (188 cm)
- Weight: 195 lb (88 kg; 13 st 13 lb)

Sport
- Position: Attack
- NLL draft: 39th overall, 2002; New Jersey Storm
- MLL team Former teams: Washington Bayhawks; Boston Cannons
- NCAA team: University of Virginia
- Pro career: 2002–

Conor Gill (born February 6, 1980) is a professional lacrosse player who had an exceptional collegiate career at the University of Virginia before going on to the professional ranks.

== High school and collegiate career ==
Conor Gill was a standout attackman in high school and college, attending St. Paul's School in Brooklandville, Maryland, where he set school records for most points in a season and most points in a career, and was selected as a high school All-American.

At the University of Virginia, Gill was a three-time All-American selection (First Team in 2000 and 2001, and Second Team in 2002) and led the Virginia Cavaliers to three Final Four appearances, including an NCAA championship in 1999. In 1999, he became the first freshman selected Most Outstanding Player of the NCAA Championships due to his standout performance in the NCAA Tournament, including a career-high five goals in a span of 3:08 against Johns Hopkins in the semifinals and a decisive two goals and game-winning assist against Syracuse in the championship game. Gill was also a three-time All-ACC selection (2000, 2001, 2002) and a two-time All-ACC Tournament selection (2000, 2001). He was named ACC Rookie of the Year in 1999 and Most Valuable Player of the 2000 ACC Tournament. The ACC named him one of the 50 greatest lacrosse players in ACC history by selecting him to the ACC 50th Anniversary Team in 2002. Gill finished tied for second in assists (146) and seventh in career points (223) in ACC history. As one of the top assist-getters in the nation, his 146 assists in 59 games places him second in the Virginia record books for most career assists, behind Tim Whiteley who had 159 assists in 63 games between 1993 and 1996. Gill also ranks fifth for most career points (233) in Virginia history.

== Professional career ==
Gill has played professional outdoor lacrosse in Major League Lacrosse, starting his pro career in 2002 with the Boston Cannons, where he was the second overall draft pick. He was named MLL Rookie of the Year, scoring 20 goals and 16 assists for 36 total points while picking up 30 groundballs on the year. In 2003, he started in all twelve Cannons games and set the MLL single season assist record with 40 assists. He became the Cannons all-time leading assist getter, was chosen Co-Offensive Player of the Week for his game against the Long Island Lizards, and was a MLL All-Star selection. In 2004, Gill scored 27 goals and tied his own record for assists with 40. He was named the Bud Light MVP three times on the season, against the Baltimore Bayhawks on May 27, against the Rochester Rattlers on June 5, and against the New Jersey Pride on June 26. In addition, Gill was named the MLL MVP for his league-leading 67 points, selected for the All-MLL Team, and chosen as the Cannons Team MVP. In 2005, Gill led the MLL in assists for a third consecutive season with 34 assists while tallying 20 goals and scooping up 39 groundballs. He finished fifth in the MLL in points with 54 points. He appeared in the 2005 MLL All-Star game and won the MLL Accuracy Shot competition. In 2006, Gill led the MLL in points for the second time in his career with 63 points on 24 goals and a league-leading 33 assists, earning the Cannons Team MVP and Offensive Player of the Year honors. He also set a career high with five two-point goals, and earned All-MLL honors for the second time in his career in addition to being tabbed a MLL All-Star.

In 2007, Gill played for the Washington Bayhawks, scoring 15 goals along with three two-point goals and 19 assists for 37 points. He picked up 21 ground balls, earned Offensive Player of the Week honors, and was named to the 2007 All-Star Team but missed the game due to injury.

== Personal ==
Gill is the son of Laurie and Gary Gill, and has a sister Meghan and two brothers, Brendan and Gavin. Both brothers also played lacrosse at Virginia. Uncle, Mike, played baseball at Clemson University.

== Statistics ==
=== MLL ===
		Regular Season							Playoffs
Season	Team	GP	G	2ptG	A	Pts	LB	PIM	GP	G	2ptG	A	Pts	LB	PIM
2002	Boston	12	20	0	16	36	30	0.5	1	1	0	1	2	2	0
2003	Boston	12	23	0	40	63	37	1	1	0	0	5	5	3	0
2004	Boston	12	26	0	40	66	27	2	2	0	0	3	3	1	0
2005	Boston	12	20	0	34	54	39	2	1	3	0	3	6	0	0
2006	Boston	12	24	5	33	62	30	1	1	0	0	2	2	0	1
2007	Washington	12	15	3	19	37	21	0	--	--	--	--	--	--	-
2008	Washington	12	12	0	29	41	16	3.5	--	--	--	--	--	--	1
MLL Totals		80	140	8	211	359	200	10	6	4	0	14	18	6	1

=== University of Virginia ===
Season	GP	G	A	Pts	PPG
1999	16	22	30	52	--
2000	15	26	40	66	--
2001	13	15	34	49	--
2002	15	14	42	56	--
Totals	59	77	146	223	--

Preceded by Keith Cromwell	Major League Lacrosse Rookie of the Year; 2002	Succeeded by Adam Doneger
Preceded by Jay Jalbert	Major League Lacrosse MVP; 2004	Succeeded by Mark Millon and Gary Gait
