= Adelphi Panthers =

Collegiate sports club in New York, US

- University: Adelphi University
- Nickname: Panthers
- NCAA: Division II
- Conference: NE-10 (primary); ECC (women's bowling)
- Athletic director: Danny McCabe
- Location: Garden City, New York
- Varsity teams: 21 (9 men's, 12 women's)
- Basketball arena: Center for Recreation and Sports
- Baseball stadium: William J. Bonomo Memorial Field
- Softball stadium: Janet L. Ficke Softball Field
- Soccer stadium: Motamed Field
- Other venues: Woodruff Hall
- Colors: Brown and gold
- Website: aupanthers.com
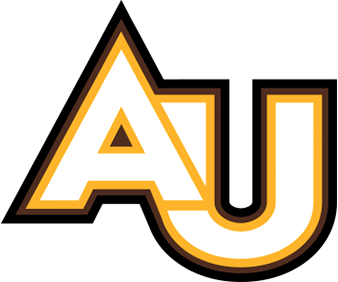

The Adelphi Panthers are the athletic teams that represent Adelphi University, located in Garden City, Long Island, New York, in NCAA Division II intercollegiate sports.

The university fields 23 varsity sports programs, and the Panthers compete as members of the Northeast-10 Conference in 22 of their 23 sports. The women's bowling team competes within the East Coast Conference as an affiliate. Adelphi has been a member of the NE10 since 2009, after joining from the ECC.

Opened in 2008, the 76,000-square-foot Center for Recreation and Sports (CRS) features a three-court gymnasium, a suspended running track and significantly upgraded athletic training and rehabilitation rooms. Complementing CRS is Adelphi’s fully renovated Woodruff Hall, which houses a fitness center, pool and additional playing courts. Adelphi also has invested in its fields and outdoor competition spaces, including its all-weather Motamed Field, Janet L. Ficke Field for softball and William J. Bonomo Memorial Field for baseball.

== NCAA national championships ==
The Panthers have won 18 NCAA Division II national championships in three different sports, with 17 of 18 coming in the sport of lacrosse. The men's lacrosse team has won eight national crowns with the last coming in 2024. The women's lacrosse team has won nine, including three consecutive national championships in 2009, 2010, 2011, consecutive championships in 2014 and 2015, and another national crown in 2017 and 2019.

In 1974, the men's soccer team were the national champions, and the Adelphi track and field program has also won numerous individual national championships.

Since transitioning to the Northeast-10, the Adelphi Panthers have become a powerhouse in the East Region. In 2013, just their fourth year in the conference, the Panthers were awarded the 2013 Northeast-10 Presidents' Cup. The Presidents' Cup is presented annually to signify overall athletic excellence in the Northeast-10. The honor is awarded to the institution that compiles the most total points from all of its programs competing in league championships. Since arriving in the Northeast-10 in 2009, the Panthers have collected 27 regular season conference titles, 29 tournament championships, 41 individual crowns and captured the Northeast-10 Presidents' Cup four times (2013, 2014, 2016 and 2017), while winning six NCAA Division II National Championships.

== Varsity teams ==
Men's sports	Women's sports
Baseball	Basketball
Basketball	Bowling
Cross country	Cross country
Golf	Field hockey
Lacrosse	Golf
Soccer	Lacrosse
Swimming and diving	Soccer
Track and field	Softball
Wrestling	Swimming and diving
	Tennis
	Track and field
	Volleyball

== National championships ==
=== Team ===
Association	Division	Sport	Year	Opponent	Score
NCAA	Division II	Men's Lacrosse	1979	UMBC	17–12
NCAA	Division II	Men's Lacrosse	1981	Loyola (MD)	17–14
NCAA	Division II	Men's Lacrosse	1993	C.W. Post	11–7
NCAA	Division II	Men's Lacrosse	1995	Springfield	12–10
NCAA	Division II	Men's Lacrosse	1998	C.W. Post	18–6
NCAA	Division II	Men's Lacrosse	1999	C.W. Post	16–8
NCAA	Division II	Men's Lacrosse	2001	Limestone	14–10
NCAA	Division II	Men's Lacrosse	2024	Lenoir–Rhyne	12–10
NCAA	Division II	Men's Lacrosse	2025	Tampa	9–8
NCAA	Division II	Women's Lacrosse	2004	West Chester	11–12
NCAA	Division II	Women's Lacrosse	2006	West Chester	16–8
NCAA	Division II	Women's Lacrosse	2009	Lock Haven	16–4
NCAA	Division II	Women's Lacrosse	2010	West Chester	17–7
NCAA	Division II	Women's Lacrosse	2011	Limestone	17–4
NCAA	Division II	Women's Lacrosse	2014	Lock Haven	7–5
NCAA	Division II	Women's Lacrosse	2015	Lock Haven	5–4
NCAA	Division II	Women's Lacrosse	2017	Florida Southern	6–4
NCAA	Division II	Women's Lacrosse	2019	West Chester	11–5
NCAA	Division II	Men's Soccer	1974	Seattle Pacific	3–2
United States Team Handball Federation (USTHF)	Open Division; Adult national championship	Men's Team handball	1971		
United States Team Handball Federation (USTHF)	Open Division; Adult national championship	Men's Team handball	1972	United States Army	21–16
United States Team Handball Federation (USTHF)	Open Division; Adult national championship	Men's Team handball	1973		
United States Team Handball Federation (USTHF)	Open Division; Adult national championship	Men's Team handball	1974	Jersey Jets	
United States Team Handball Federation (USTHF)	College Division	Men's Team handball	1972		

== Individual teams ==
=== Baseball ===
The baseball team has participated in the NCAA Tournament 16 times in its history, and has advanced to the Division II College World Series four times. The team has seen several of their players selected in the MLB first year player draft, including Bobby Lanigan who was selected in the 3rd round (92nd overall) by the Minnesota Twins in 2008 and Keith Couch who was selected 413th overall by the Boston Red Sox in 2010. In 2013, the Panthers' single-season and career saves leader Dillion McNamara was selected in the 27th round by the New York Yankees.

The baseball team is currently led by Bill Ianciello, who succeeded former Yankees bullpen coach Dom Scala (2004 - 2021), who was named head coach in 2021. Their home games are played at William J. Bonomo Memorial Field, a state of the art artificial turf complex located in the heart of the campus.

=== Soccer ===
Adelphi fields both a men's and women's soccer team. Adelphi's men's soccer team competed at the NCAA Division I level until 2012, following the dissolution of the Atlantic Soccer Conference in 2011; starting in 2013, men's soccer will compete at the Division II level.

The men's team won the 1974 Division II National Championship, and have won three ASC championships: in 2006, 2008, and 2009. In addition, they were also declared tournament champions in 2006 and 2009. The team has produced former professional soccer players and United States national team members Dave Cayemitte and Chris Armas, the first was called to training camps in November 1984 by then USMNT manager Alketas Panagoulias. Cayemitte would earn his sole cap for the USMNT appearing in a friendly match against Ecuador on December 2, 1984. The latter, who was a USISL All-Star for the Long Island Rough Riders and in 1996 was selected in the first round of the MLS Supplemental Draft by the Los Angeles Galaxy. He also went on to play for the Puerto Rico and United States national teams. Armas returned to Garden City in 2011 to take the reins of the women's soccer team as head coach.

The women's soccer team has won 7 ECC championships (1996, 1997, 2001–04, 2007). In 2012, the Panthers advanced to the Northeast-10 Conference Championship game as the No. 8 seed, the first No. 8 seed in the history of the conference championships to do so.

=== Volleyball ===
Under the direction of head coach Danielle MacKnight, the volleyball team has become one of the leading programs in the NCAA Division II East Region. In 2009, MacKnight received the American Volleyball Coaches Association (AVCA) Thirty Under 30 Award as one of the top thirty coaches under the age of 30 in the nation at all levels. Under her direction, the Panthers have recorded six consecutive season of 20 wins or more and have appeared in six consecutive NCAA Tournaments. Over that span, the Panthers have had 13 All-Region selections, one ESPN: The Magazine All-American and, in 2013, one AVCA Division II All-American, the first in the 20-year history of the program. In 2011, the Panthers took home the program's first-ever conference championship after winning the Northeast-10 Tournament title, and claimed back-to-back conference crowns in 2014 and 2015.

=== Women's basketball ===
After a series of lean years following strong results in the early 2000s, the women's basketball team claimed the program's first NE-10 Tournament crown in 2014 after hosting three playoff games and defeating American International College in the championship. Behind a 28-3 record, the Panthers were awarded the top seed and hosting privileges in the 2015 Division II East Regional.

=== Softball ===
Adelphi's softball team appeared in three Women's College World Series in 1984, 1985 and 1988 as a Division I program. In 2015, the Panthers advanced to their first WCWS as a Division II program, and repeated the feat in the 2016 season. They returned yet again in the 2022 season.
