= Mercyhurst Lakers =

Athletic teams representing Mercyhurst University

- University: Mercyhurst University
- Nickname: Lakers
- NCAA: Division I (FCS)
- Conference: Northeast Conference (primary); AHA (women's ice hockey); CWPA (men's and women's water polo)
- Athletic director: Joe Spano
- Location: Erie, Pennsylvania
- Varsity teams: 26
- Football stadium: Saxon Stadium
- Arena: Mercyhurst Athletic Center
- Baseball stadium: Mercyhurst Baseball Field
- Other venues: Mercyhurst Ice Center
- Colors: Forest green and navy blue
- Mascot: Luke the Laker
- Website: hurstathletics.com
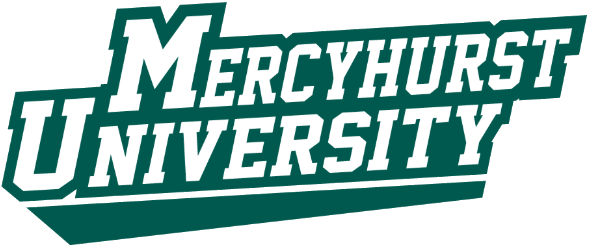

The Mercyhurst Lakers are the 24 intercollegiate athletic teams representing Mercyhurst University, located in Erie, Pennsylvania. The Lakers compete in the National Collegiate Athletic Association (NCAA) Division I and are members of the Northeast Conference for most sports. The men's and women's ice hockey teams are members of Atlantic Hockey America, formed shortly after the 2023–24 season by the merger of the men's former home of the Atlantic Hockey Association and the women's former home of College Hockey America. The men's and women's water polo teams play in the Collegiate Water Polo Association.

All of Mercyhurst's sports officially joined Division I in the fall of 2024 after previously competing primarily in the Pennsylvania State Athletic Conference in NCAA Division II.

== Teams ==
The most recently added sports were stunt, added for 2023–24, the same year in which the sport was added to the NCAA Emerging Sports for Women program. and Track and Field, added for 2024-2025. Women's wrestling will be added in 2026–27.

Men's sports	Women's sports
Baseball	Basketball
Basketball	Bowling
Cross country	Cross country
Football	Field hockey
Golf	Golf
Ice hockey	Ice hockey
Lacrosse	Lacrosse
Heavyweight rowing	Rowing
Lightweight rowing	Soccer
Soccer	Softball
Tennis	Stunt
Track and Field	Tennis
Water polo	Track and Field
Wrestling	Volleyball
	Water polo
	Wrestling (2026–27)

== History ==
National championships

- 1976: Men's tennis – NAIA
- 2004: Women's rowing (team champion) – NCAA Division II
- 2005: Men's rowing (4+ open) – ECAC National Champion
- 2009: Josh Shields (165 lbs), wrestling – NCAA Division II
- 2010: Women's rowing (8+ champion) – NCAA Division II
- 2011: Men's lacrosse – NCAA Division II
- 2016: Men's Lightweight Rowing: Dad Vail Champions (Lightweight 8+)
- 2021: Women’s rowing: Dad Vail Champions (8+ open)
- 2021: Women’s rowing: Dad Vail Champions (4+ open)
- 2022: Women rowing: Dad Vail Champions (8+ open)
- 2022: Women’s rowing (8+ open Champion) - NCAA Division II
- 2022: Women’s rowing (4+ open Champion) - NCAA Division II
- 2022: Women’s rowing (team champion) - NCAA Division II

National finalist

- 2007: Men's lacrosse – NCAA Division II
- 2009: Women's ice hockey – NCAA Division I
- 2009: Women's rowing – NCAA Division II
- 2010: Josh Shields (165 lbs), wrestling – NCAA Division II
- 2011: Women's rowing – NCAA Division II
- 2013: Men's lacrosse – NCAA Division II
- 2021: Women’s rowing - NCAA Division II

Mercyhurst University non-varsity sports
American Collegiate Hockey Association (ACHA) – Division I

- Men's ice hockey (College Hockey Mid-America)
