= LIU Post Pioneers =

Former US college athletic program

- University: C.W. Post Campus of Long Island University
- NCAA: Division II (Division I after merger with LIU Brooklyn in 2019)
- Conference: East Coast Conference; Northeast-10 Conference (Northeast Conference after merger with LIU Brooklyn in 2019)
- Athletic director: Bryan Collins
- Location: Brookville, New York
- Varsity teams: 19
- Football stadium: Bethpage Federal Credit Union Stadium
- Basketball arena: Pratt Recreation Center
- Baseball stadium: LIU Post Baseball Field
- Softball stadium: LIU Post Softball Complex
- Soccer stadium: Pioneer Soccer Park
- Nickname: Pioneers
- Colors: Green and gold
- Website: liupostpioneers.com

The LIU Post Pioneers (also Long Island–Post Pioneers and formerly the C.W. Post Pioneers) were the athletic teams which represented the C.W. Post Campus of Long Island University in Brookville, New York, in NCAA Division II intercollegiate sports through the 2018–19 school year. The Pioneers most recently competed as members of the East Coast Conference for most sports; the football team was an affiliate of the Northeast-10 Conference. LIU Post has been a member of the ECC since 1989, when the league was established as the New York Collegiate Athletic Conference.

After the 2018–19 school year, LIU merged the Pioneers with the LIU Brooklyn Blackbirds, the Division I program of the school's Brooklyn campus. The LIU program competes as the LIU Sharks, with the new nickname having been selected by polling of alumni and students of the two campuses. Since LIU Brooklyn was a long-established Division I program, the Division II LIU Post teams for sports that had not been sponsored by LIU Brooklyn immediately moved to Division I without the usual transition period for an institution moving to a different division. Teams for sports sponsored by both campuses were merged, and D-II athletes unable to make the D-I teams were allowed to either continue their athletic scholarships without competing or to be granted waivers that allowed them to transfer to another D-II school without having to sit out a season. The LIU Sharks inherited the Northeast Conference membership of the Brooklyn campus.

== Varsity teams ==
Men's sports (8)

- Baseball
- Basketball
- Cross country
- Football
- Lacrosse
- Soccer
- Track and field
- Wrestling

Women's sports (11)

- Basketball
- Cross country
- Fencing
- Equestrian
- Golf
- Lacrosse
- Soccer
- Softball
- Swimming
- Tennis
- Track and field
- Volleyball
- Rugby

== Facilities ==
The Pratt Center is also a venue for Nassau County and New York State high school basketball playoff games, both men's and women's, along with the Clark Center at the State University of New York College at Old Westbury.

== History ==
=== Classifications ===
- 1958–1972: NCAA College Division
- 1973–1974, 1978–1985: NCAA Division II
- 1975–1977, 1986–1992: NCAA Division III
- 1993–2019: NCAA Division II
- 2019–present: NCAA Division I (after merging with Division I LIU Brooklyn)

=== Football conferences ===
- 1957–1971: College Division Independent
- 1972–1976: Metropolitan Intercollegiate Conference
- 1977–1984: Division II Independent
- 1985–1992: Liberty Football Conference
- 1993–1996: Division II Independent
- 1997–2000: Eastern Football Conference
- 2001–2007: Northeast-10 Conference
- 2008–2012: Pennsylvania State Athletic Conference
- 2013–2018: Northeast-10 Conference
- 2019–present: Northeast Conference (after merging with Division I LIU Brooklyn)

== National championships ==
=== Team ===
Association	Division	Sport	Year	Opponent	Score
NCAA	Division II	Women's Lacrosse	2001	West Chester	13–9
NCAA	Division II	Women's Lacrosse	2007	West Chester	15–7
NCAA	Division II	Women's Lacrosse	2012	West Chester	17–16
NCAA	Division II	Women's Lacrosse	2013	Limestone	10–7

== Individual sports ==
=== Baseball ===
In baseball, future Major League Baseball outfielder Richie Scheinblum batted .415 in 1964, and set the C.W. Post records in career triples (12) and batting average (.395). He was inducted in the college's sports Hall of Fame in 2005. LIU Post's baseball team competed for many years at the Division I level, as part of the Diamond Conference and the Mid-Continent Conference, as well as an independent. The current LIU Sharks baseball program plays on the former LIU Post Baseball Field on the Brookville campus.

=== Football ===
In 1993, future NFL quarterback Perry Klein played for the C. W. Post Pioneers, throwing for 38 touchdowns. Klein was named the Division II Player of the Year, after throwing for an NCAA Division II record 614 yards passing (623 yards total yardage), 35 completions, and seven touchdowns in a single game, and a Division II record 3,757 regular season yards passing and 4,025 regular season yards in total offense, while also setting a school single-season records of most touchdowns.

=== Lacrosse ===
LIU Post won three NCAA Division II Men's Lacrosse Championships. Their first title came in 1996 when they defeated Adelphi 15–10 in the championship and their second came in 2009 when they defeated Le Moyne 8–7 at Gillette Stadium in Foxborough, Mass. The third title came in 2010 when they defeated Le Moyne 14–9 in a rematch of the 2009 title game at M&T Bank Stadium in Baltimore.

The LIU Post women's lacrosse team had a perfect, undefeated season and won the NCAA Division II Women's Lacrosse Championship in 2007.
