= Limestone Saints =

Intercollegiate sports teams of Limestone University, South Carolina, US

- University: Limestone University
- Nickname: Saints
- NCAA: Division II
- Conference: South Atlantic (primary); Conference Carolinas (acrobatics & tumbling, men's wrestling); Independent (men's volleyball)
- Athletic director: Hailey P. Martin
- Location: Gaffney, South Carolina
- First season: 1973 (closed in 2025)
- Varsity teams: 25 (11 men's, 12 women's, 2 co-ed)
- Football stadium: Saints Field
- Basketball arena: Timken Center
- Baseball stadium: Founders FCU Stadium
- Softball stadium: Babe Ruth Field
- Soccer stadium: Saints Field
- Aquatics center: Timken Aquatic Center
- Lacrosse stadium: Saints Field
- Tennis venue: Emmie Evans Rector Tennis Center
- Colors: Blue, white, and limestone gold
- Website: golimestonesaints.com
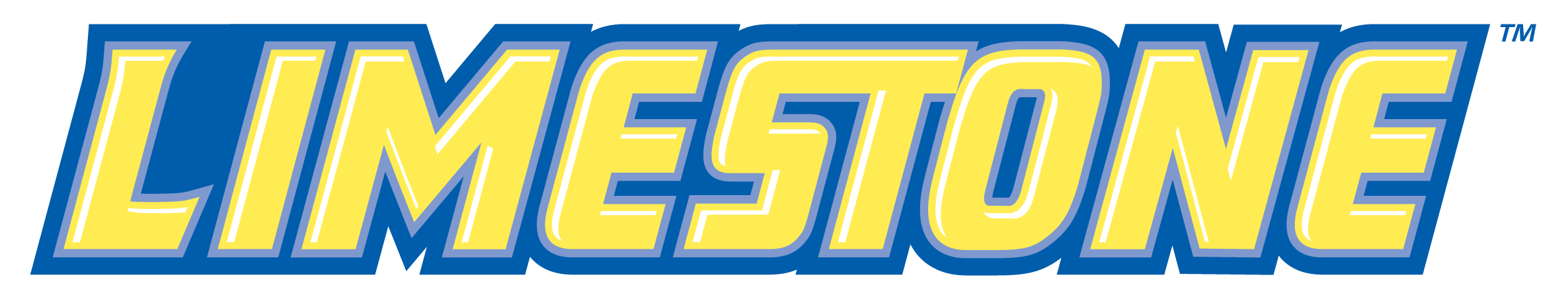

Team NCAA championships
- 6

Individual and relay NCAA champions
- 6

The Limestone Saints were the athletic teams that represented Limestone University, located in Gaffney, South Carolina, in NCAA Division II intercollegiate sporting competitions. The Saints competed as members of the South Atlantic Conference (SAC) for most sports, having joined that league in July 2020 after 22 years in Conference Carolinas (CC). Limestone maintained CC membership in two sports, specifically men's wrestling and women's acrobatics & tumbling. Men's wrestling is one of two sports in which the SAC and CC operate as a single league, the other being women's field hockey.

The SAC operated the field hockey championship, while CC operates the wrestling championship. The men's volleyball team competed as an independent. The swim team competed in the Bluegrass Mountain Conference before being dropped in 2018; the field hockey and wrestling teams were members of the ECAC–Division II before 2018, when the SAC and CC established their alliance in those two sports. The football team had been independent, but entered into a scheduling agreement with the SAC in 2015. This agreement was replaced in 2017 by formal affiliate membership, which continued until the Saints joined the SAC full-time in 2020.

In May 2025, the university announced its athletics programs would be discontinued, and the school was closed.

== History ==
Until 1997, Limestone competed for championships in the National Association of Intercollegiate Athletics (NAIA). Limestone gained membership in the National Collegiate Athletic Association's (NCAA) Division II in 1991 and began competing for NCAA championships when it joined the Carolinas-Virginia Athletics Conference in 1998. Today, 21 of Limestone's athletic teams compete in the South Atlantic Conference, with women's acrobatics & tumbling and men's wrestling competing in Conference Carolinas, and men's volleyball and women's wrestling competing as independents. In 2014, the field hockey team joined the inaugural ECAC Division II conference in that sport and was joined by wrestling (previously competing as an independent) for the 2015–16 season, with both sports moving to the SAC–CC alliance when it was established in 2018.

The most recently added sports are acrobatics & tumbling and women's wrestling, both added in the 2019–20 school year. Both sports became part of the NCAA Emerging Sports for Women program in 2020–21, at which time CC became the second NCAA conference to officially sponsor acrobatics & tumbling (after the D-II Mountain East Conference).

Limestone helped pave the way for collegiate lacrosse, swimming, and field hockey in the South. The Saints fielded South Carolina's first collegiate lacrosse team in 1990. Before being dropped after the 2017–18 season, the swimming teams were the only NCAA Division II swimming programs in South Carolina and among the few in the two Carolinas.

Over the years, the Saints baseball, men's and women's basketball, men's and women's golf, men's and women's lacrosse, softball, men's soccer, men's wrestling, and men's and women's tennis teams have all been ranked on the national level. Twelve student-athletes have gone on to play professionally in their sport, with seven of those signing professional baseball contracts. The Saints baseball program was started by two-time Cy Young Award winner Gaylord Perry, a member of the National Baseball Hall of Fame. Additionally, Saints athletes have earned All-American honors on over 100 occasions and over a dozen have been named Academic All-Americans.

In May 2025, the university closed its athletics programs alleging financial reasons.

== Conference affiliations ==
NCAA

- Conference Carolinas (1998–2020)
- South Atlantic Conference (2020–2025)

== Varsity teams ==
Men's sports	Women's sports
Baseball	Acrobatics & tumbling
Basketball	Basketball
Cross country	Cross country
Football	Field hockey
Golf	Golf
Lacrosse	Lacrosse
Soccer	Soccer
Tennis	Softball
Track and field (Note: The NCAA classifies indoor and outdoor track & field as two separate sports. It holds indoor championships in its winter season and outdoor championships in its spring season.)	Tennis
Wrestling	Track and field
	Volleyball

== National championships ==
=== NCAA team championships ===
Limestone won 5 NCAA team national championships.

- Men's (5)
  - Lacrosse (5): 2000, 2002, 2014, 2015, 2017

=== Other national team championships ===
Listed below is one national team title in current and emerging NCAA sports that was not awarded by the NCAA.

- Men's (1)
  - Golf (1): 1984^{a}

^{a} NAIA

=== Individual ===
Association	Division	Sport	Year	Individual(s)	Event
NAIA	–	Men's Golf	1984	Chip Johnson	Men's Championship
NCAA	Division II	Wrestling	2008	Dan Scanlan	184 pounds
NCAA	Division II	Wrestling	2017	DeAndre' Johnson	157 pounds
NCAA	Division II	Men's Swimming and Diving	2008	Craig Jordens; Chris Harrigan; Anders Melin; Goran Majlat	200-yard freestyle relay
NCAA	Division II	Men's Swimming and Diving	2009	Craig Jordens; Matt Parsonage; Anders Melin; Goran Majlat	200-yard freestyle relay
NCAA	Division II	Men's Swimming and Diving	2009	Goran Majlat	50-yard freestyle
NCAA	Division II	Men's Track and Field	2017	Marshawn Scott	60m hurdles

== Conference championships ==
=== Regular-season conference championships ===
(since 1998)

- Baseball (2005)
- Women's Basketball (2012–2017)
- Women's Lacrosse (2004–2016)
- Women's Soccer (2017)
- Men's Lacrosse (1998–2017)
- Men's Soccer (2012, 2014, 2024)
- Softball (2009–2011, 2014–2016)
- Volleyball (2006)
- Field Hockey (ECAC- 2014, 2015) (SAC- 2017)

=== Conference tournament titles ===
- Men's lacrosse (1994, 2000–2007, 2009–17)
- Women's lacrosse (2006, 2008–14, 2016–2017)
- Men's soccer (2006, 2012, 2023, 2024)
- Women's soccer (2015, 2017, 2022)
- Softball (2015)
- Field Hockey (ECAC- 2013, 2014, 2015) (SAC- 2018, 2019, 2024)
- Women's track and field (2009 and 2010)
- Men's track and field (2013)
- Men's basketball (2011, 2014, 2017)
- Women's basketball (2012, 2014–2016)
- Men's golf (2015–2017)
- Women's golf (2014–2016)

== Individual sports ==
=== Men's lacrosse ===
Limestone is an established powerhouse in men's lacrosse and has won five national championship titles (2000, 2002, 2014, 2015, and 2017). The Saints have also compiled nineteen Conference Championship titles in (1994, 1999–2007, and 2009–2017). With its 2000 national title, Limestone College became the smallest coeducational institution to ever win an NCAA national championship. They are set to play on Sunday, May 26, 2019.

=== Women's lacrosse ===
The Limestone College women's lacrosse program has made appearances in nine NCAA Division II National Tournaments (2004, 2006 and 2008–2014), reaching the NCAA DII National Championship in both 2011 and 2013. They have been regular-season conference champions for thirteen consecutive seasons (2004–2016) and accumulated nine conference tournament championships (2006, 2008–2014, 2016). They are the southernmost collegiate women's lacrosse program to make an appearance in a national tournament. The current Head Coach of the program is Scott Tucker (2002–present). Tucker beginning in 2015 became the winningest active coach in NCAA Division II women's lacrosse.

=== Women's basketball ===
Limestone's women's basketball program has made 5 consecutive appearances in the NCAA Division II National Tournament (2012-2016), reaching the elite eight in 2014, and the final four in 2015.

=== Football ===
On October 26, 2012, Limestone announced they would add football and begin play in 2014. Bobby James, previously the defensive coordinator at Wingate University was named the inaugural head coach on December 14, 2012. After a "redshirt" season with players but only scrimmages, Limestone began NCAA Division II play in the fall of 2014 and recorded a record of 2–9, followed by a 2–8 season in 2015. James left the program in early 2016, and on May 11, 2016, Limestone College announced the hiring of former National Football League wide receiver Mike Furrey as the second head coach for the Saints. Furrey was previously the wide receivers coach at Marshall University and a former head coach at Kentucky Christian University. Under Furrey, the Saints went 5–6 in his first season, followed by a 4–6 campaign in 2017. He departed the team in January 2018 to become the wide receivers coach for the Chicago Bears.

The Saints had competed in football as an independent, but during the 2015–2018 seasons arranged a scheduling agreement with the South Atlantic Conference to provide most of their contests. In April 2017, the Limestone Saints were announced as the first associate member of the South Atlantic Conference (in any sport), and began competition in the SAC beginning in the fall of 2017. They remained an SAC football affiliate until becoming a full conference member in 2020.
