= Christian Cook =

American lacrosse player (born 1975)

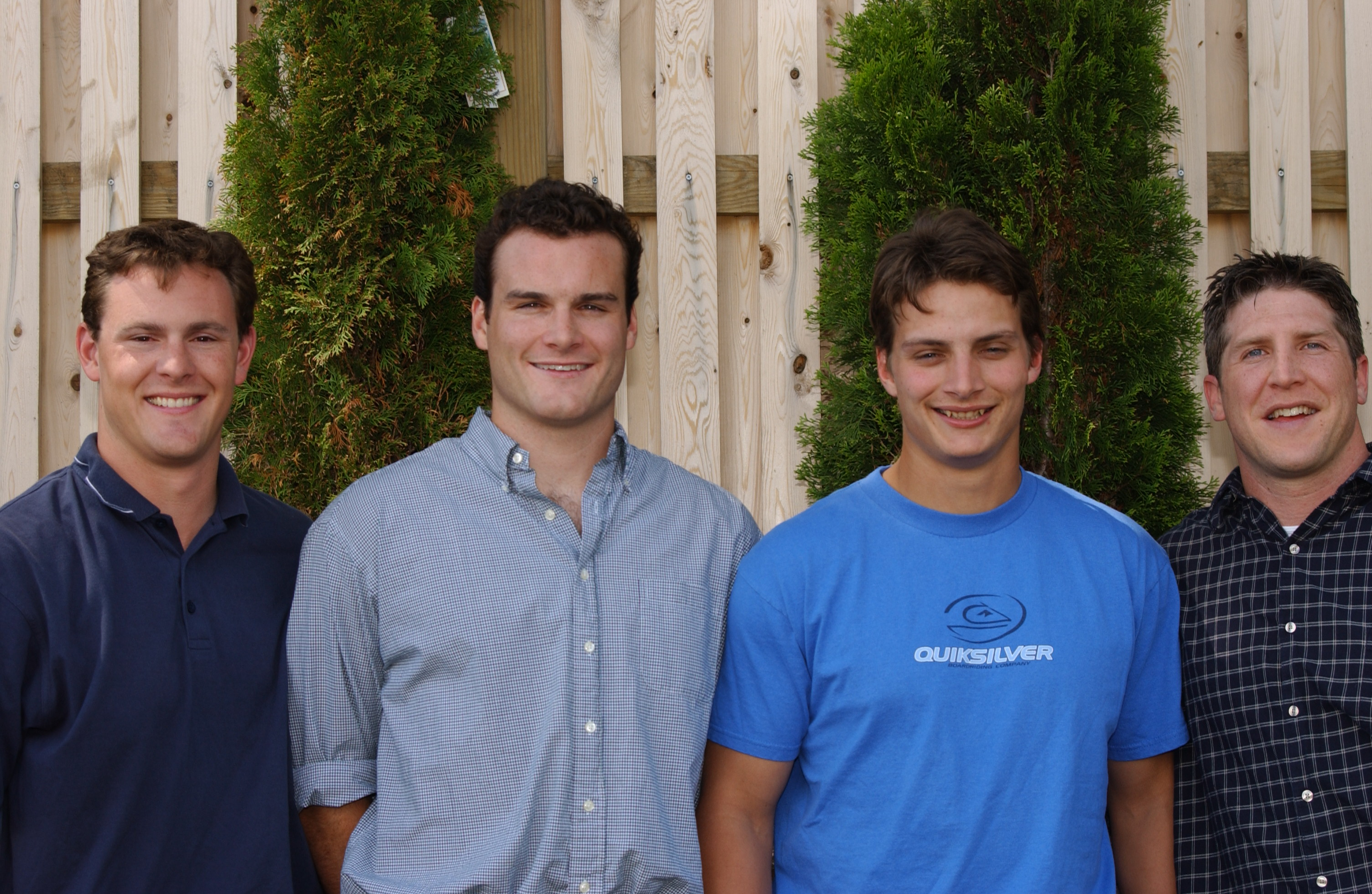

Personal information
- Nationality: American
- Born: June 3, 1975 (age 51) Denver, Colorado, U.S.
- Height: 6 ft 0 in (183 cm)
- Weight: 200 lb (91 kg; 14 st 4 lb)

Sport
- Position: Defense
- MLL teams: New Jersey Pride (2001–2004); Baltimore Bayhawks (2004–2006); Washington Bayhawks (2007–2008)
- NCAA team: Princeton University
- Pro career: 2001–2008

Career highlights
- College highlights: Schmeisser Award (1998); Men's Ivy League Player of the Year (1994); All-American 2x (1st team: 1998; 3rd team: 1997); NCAA Men's Lacrosse Championship (1996, 1997 & 1998); Professional highlights: Major League Lacrosse Steinfeld Cup Champion (2005); Major League Lacrosse All-Star 2x
Medal record
Representing United States
Lacrosse
World Lacrosse Championship
Silver medal – second place	2006 London (Ontario)	Field lacrosse

Christian Cook (born June 3, 1975 in Denver, Colorado) is a retired professional lacrosse defenseman who last played professional field lacrosse with the Washington Bayhawks of Major League Lacrosse (MLL). He starred as a member of the Princeton Tigers men's lacrosse team from 1995 through 1998, where he earned National Collegiate Athletic Association (NCAA) lacrosse defenseman of the year award, two United States Intercollegiate Lacrosse Association (USILA) All-American recognitions (one first team), four Ivy League championships, and three national championships.

As a professional he has been recognized as the Major League Lacrosse Defensive Player of the Year and been a member of Team USA at the World Lacrosse Championships. He was twice named to the Major League Lacrosse All-Star Game and has been a member of an MLL Steinfeld Cup championship team.

== Background ==
Cook was a high school All-American lacrosse player at Denver East High School.

== College career ==
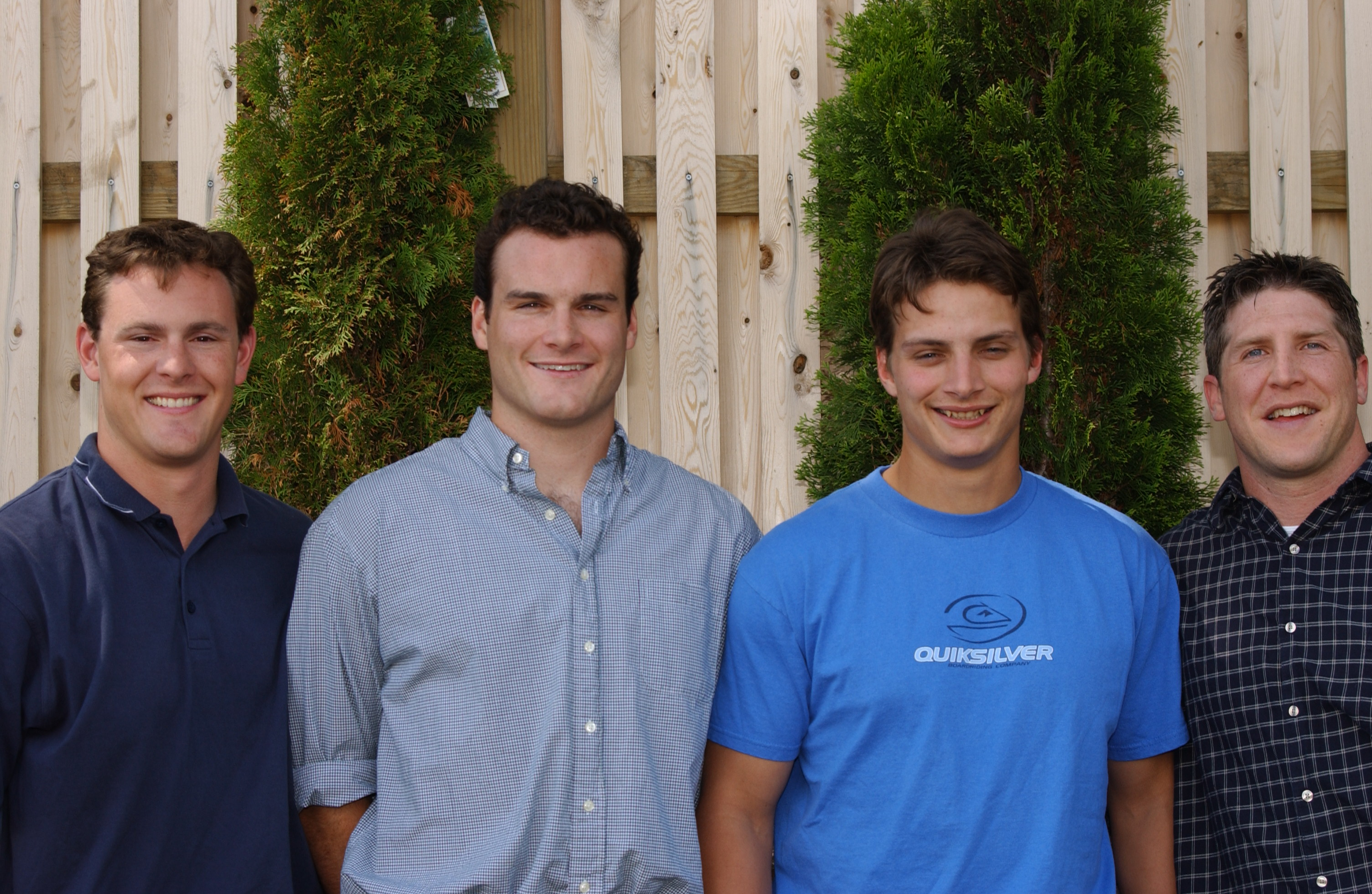
(left to right): Cook, Jesse Hubbard, Trevor Tierney and Keith Elias in 2002

He anchored the defense of the teams that were led on offense by the record-setting trio of revered attackmen Jesse Hubbard, Jon Hess and Chris Massey. He was awarded the 1998 Schmeisser Award as the best NCAA lacrosse defenseman. He was a first team USILA All-American Team selection in 1998 and third team selection in 1997. He was also first team All-Ivy League in 1997 and 1998. The 1995 team, which earned the school's sixth consecutive NCAA Men's Lacrosse Championship invitation, was Ivy League co-champion, while the 1996–1998 teams were 6–0 undefeated outright conference champions. These undefeated league champions won the 1996, 1997 and 1998 NCAA Division I Men's Lacrosse Championships, becoming the first team to threepeat since Syracuse from 1988–90 and the first to be recognized to have done so without an NCAA scandal since Johns Hopkins from 1978–80. He was a co-captain during his 1998 senior season. Cook was named to Princeton's All-Decade team.

In one game as a senior, he held the Ivy League's leading scorer, Mike Ferrucci of Harvard, scoreless. In the 1998 NCAA Division I Men's Lacrosse Championship tournament semifinals he held the nation's leading scorer Casey Powell of Syracuse without a goal in the 11–10 victory, but he was injured and had to sit out the finals on crutches. He was named to the All-tournament team nonetheless.

== Professional career ==
Cook played with the New Jersey Pride during the 2001 through 2003 MLL seasons. The Pride traded him to the Baltimore Bayhawks for a second round draft choice in the 2005 Collegiate Draft. He then played with the Baltimore Bayhawks from 2004 through 2006 and stayed with the franchise when it became the Washington Bayhawks for the 2007 and 2008 seasons. Cook was part of the Bayhawks' 2005 Steinfeld Cup MLL Championship team. He is a two-time Major League Lacrosse All-Star.

Cook missed four games of the 2006 season due to participation in the World Games. At the 2006 World Lacrosse Championships, he was one of four Princeton athletes on Team USA.

== Personal ==
Cook has worked for the United States Secret Service, American Enterprise Institute and PricewaterhouseCoopers. He competed in the AAU Junior Olympic Games in skiing in 1990. Cook was named to the Colorado Lacrosse Hall of Fame in 2003. His sister, Lauren, played lacrosse at Davidson College in Charlotte, North Carolina. He is the son of Gary and Diane Cook. He earned his Bachelor of Arts in Politics from Princeton University and his Master of Business Administration from Georgetown University. Christian and Lauren have founded Play for Parkinson's Lacrosse after their mother was diagnosed with early stage Parkinson's disease.

Preceded by Brian Kuczma	William C. Schmeisser Award; 1998	Succeeded by Ryan Curtis
Preceded by Rob Doerr	Major League Lacrosse Defensive Player of the Year Award; 2002	Succeeded by Ryan Curtis
