= Ryan Mollett =

Lacrosse player

Personal information
- Nationality: American
- Born: November 3, 1978 (age 48) New York City, New York, U.S.
- Height: 6 ft 2 in (188 cm)
- Weight: 200 lb (91 kg; 14 st 4 lb)
- Website: MLL webpage

Sport
- Position: Defenseman
- NLL draft: 22nd overall, 2001; New York Saints
- MLL teams: Rochester Rattlers (2001–2005); Chicago Machine (2006)*; New Jersey Pride (2006–2007) *appeared in no games
- NCAA team: Princeton University
- Pro career: 2001–2007

Career highlights
- College highlights: Schmeisser Award (2001); Men's Ivy League Player of the Year (2001); All-American 3x (1st team: 2001; honorable mention: 2000); NCAA Men's Lacrosse Championship (1998 & 2001); USILA Scholar All-American (2001); Professional highlights: Major League Lacrosse All-Star (2003)

Ryan Mollett
Medal record

Representing United States

Lacrosse

World Lacrosse Championship
Gold medal – first place	2002 Perth	Field lacrosse

Ryan DeForest Mollett (born November 3, 1978) is a finance executive and a retired lacrosse defenseman who played professional field lacrosse in Major League Lacrosse (MLL). He starred as a member of the Princeton Tigers men's lacrosse team from 1998 through 2001, where he was the best NCAA lacrosse defenseman in the nation, the Ivy League player of the year, a two-time United States Intercollegiate Lacrosse Association (USILA) All-American (first team once), two-time All-Ivy League first team selection and a member of two national champion teams. During his time at Princeton, the team qualified for the NCAA Men's Lacrosse Championship all four years, reached the championship game three times, won the championship game twice and won four Ivy League championships. He was a member of Team USA at the 2002 World Lacrosse Championship. He was the first collegiate player ever drafted in the MLL and became an MLL All-Star player.

== Background ==
In 1997, Mollett along with teammate John Glatzel led his Boys' Latin School of Maryland lacrosse team to an undefeated season and the Maryland Interscholastic Athletic Association A Conference championship.

== College career ==
He served as co-captain of the 2001 team that won the 2001 NCAA Division I Men's Lacrosse Championship. Mollett won the 2001 Schmeisser Award as the best National Collegiate Athletic Association (NCAA) lacrosse defenseman. He was the 2001 Men's Ivy League Player of the Year. He was a first team USILA All-American Team selection in 2001 and an honorable mention selection in 2000. He was a first team All-Ivy League selection in 2000 and 2001, when he was Ivy League Player of the year. During his four-year career, Princeton went undefeated in Ivy League Conference play with consecutive 6–0 records. He was a 2001 USILA Scholar All-American. As of 2014, Mollett was ranked 13th all-time at Princeton University as a lacrosse player. He was a part of the 2001 Princeton team that allowed only 5.8 goals per game, lowest for a Princeton team in the modern era and lowest total for an Ivy League team (fourth all-time in Division I).

== Professional career ==
In 2001, the Rochester Rattlers selected Mollett as the first player drafted in the first Major League Lacrosse Collegiate Draft. That same year, the New York Saints of the box lacrosse National Lacrosse League made Mollett the 22nd overall selection in the second round of the 2001 NLL draft. He played for the Rattlers from 2001 to 2005. Then, he became a member of the Chicago Machine, but never appeared in a game for them. The Machine had drafted him in the 2006 MLL Expansion Draft, but he requested to be traded. In March 2006, the Machine traded Mollett to the New Jersey Pride. He played with the Pride from 2006 until 2007. In 2003, he was selected as an All-Star.

Mollett represented the United States at the 2002 World Lacrosse Championship where they won the championship. After obtaining his M.B.A. in 2007, he went to work for BlackRock as Portfolio Manager and Senior Research Analyst. Prior to joining BlackRock, he was a Trader at First New York Securities. Mr. Mollett began his career as a Consultant with Gemini Realty Advisors. He is now a Senior Managing Director with GSO. Since joining GSO in 2011, Mr. Mollett has focused on distressed and special situation investing. Mr. Mollett is on the Investment Committee and serves as a Portfolio Manager of GSO Community Development Capital Group as well as GSO Hedge Fund Strategies.

== Personal ==
Mollet obtained a M.B.A. from Yale School of Management in 2007. That year, his wedding to Glamour magazine fashion editor Samantha Noelle Bishopp was announced in The New York Times. Mollett is the son of Dorothy Mollett and Richard C. Mollett of Taneytown, Maryland.

Preceded by Josh Sims	Ivy League Men's Lacrosse Player of the Year; 2001	Succeeded by Ryan Boyle
Preceded by Inaugural draft	Major League Lacrosse first overall collegiate draft choice 2001	Succeeded by Josh Coffman
Preceded by Marshall Abrams	Schmeisser Award; 2001	Succeeded by John Glatzel
