= Chris Massey (lacrosse) =

American retired lacrosse player

Personal information
- Nationality: American

Sport
- Position: Attackman
- NLL draft: 16th overall, 1998; New York Saints
- NLL teams: New York Saints (1999–2000)
- MLL teams: Boston Cannons (2001); New Jersey Pride (2001–2002); Long Island Lizards (2003–2007); Los Angeles Riptide (2007)
- NCAA team: Princeton University
- Pro career: 1999–2007

Career highlights
- College highlights: All-American 3x (2nd team: 1998; 3rd team: 1996 & 1997); All-Ivy League 3x (1st team: 1997 & 1998; honorable mention: 1996); NCAA Men's Lacrosse Championship (1996, 1997 & 1998); Records: Princeton consecutive games with a goal (46, 1998–present); Professional highlights: Major League Lacrosse Steinfeld Cup championship (2003)

Christopher G. Massey is a retired lacrosse attackman who played professional field lacrosse in the Major League Lacrosse (MLL). He starred as a member of the Princeton Tigers men's lacrosse team from 1995 through 1998, where he earned three United States Intercollegiate Lacrosse Association (USILA) All-American recognitions, four Ivy League championships, and three national championships. He holds the Princeton lacrosse scoring records for consecutive games with a goal and ranks second in career goals. As a professional, he paid his way through law school as the MLL's only part-time law student/lawyer. In high school he was a two-time All-American and a state champion.

== Background ==
Massey is from Garden City, New York on Long Island. Massey was a member of the Garden City High School New York State Public High School Athletic Association Class B lacrosse championship team in 1994. At Garden City, Massey was a two-time high school All-American in lacrosse.

== College career ==
Massey was part of a trio of revered attackmen who were Princeton classmates along with Jesse Hubbard and Jon Hess. As starters, the trio of All-Americans, which retired second (Hess), third (Hubbard) and fourth (Massey) career points at Princeton, had a 43–2 record and combined for 618 points. He was a second team USILA All-American Team selection in 1998 and third team selection in 1996 and 1997. He was also first team All-Ivy League in 1997 and 1998 and an honorable mention selection in 1996. The 1995 team, which earned the school's sixth consecutive NCAA Men's Lacrosse Championship invitation, was Ivy League co-champion, while the 1996–1998 teams were 6–0 undefeated outright conference champions. These undefeated league champions won the 1996, 1997 and 1998 NCAA Division I Men's Lacrosse Championships, becoming the first team to threepeat since Syracuse from 1988–90 and the first to be recognized to have done so without an NCAA scandal since Johns Hopkins from 1978–80.

In the 1996 NCAA championship quarterfinals, he scored five goals in the 22–6 victory over Towson State. In the 1996 semifinals, he scored a game-high six goals in an 11–9 victory over Syracuse, including a key goal after Syracuse tied the score at 9. In the 1997 semifinals, he scored a game-high three goals in the 10–9 come-from-behind victory over Duke, including the tenth one as they erased a 9–7 deficit. He scored three goals in the 19–7 1997 championship game victory against Maryland. The 1997 team is regarded as the best in school history with a record number of wins during its 15–0 season. He served as co-captain of the 1998 team, and he scored a goal during the 1998 Championship game against Maryland. Massey holds the Princeton record for consecutive games with a goal (46) and remains second to Hubbard in career goals (146 vs. 163) at Princeton.

=== Princeton University ===
Season	GP	G	A	Pts	PPG
1995	15	21	6	27	--
1996	15	46	13	59	3.9
1997	15	45	14	59	3.9
1998	15	34	13	47	3.1
Totals	60	146	46	192	3.2

== Professional career ==
Massey played with the New York Saints during the 1999 and 2000 NLL seasons. Although the MLL has many part-time players who work in other professions on off days, Massey was the first lawyer. Massey began his MLL career with the Boston Cannons during the 2001 MLL season after being drafted in the third round of the 2001 MLL Inaugural Team Draft. Massey joined the New Jersey Pride later that season and played with them during the 2002 MLL season as well. He then played with the Long Island Lizards from 2003 through 2007 after they acquired him along with Jay Jalbert. He finished his career at the end of the 2007 season with the Los Angeles Riptide. Massey helped the Lizards win the 2003 MLL Steinfeld Cup championship. He works in the corporate litigation department at the New York and New Jersey offices of Bressler, Amery & Ross. After graduating from Princeton, in 1998, he started at Brooklyn Law School in 2001 and worked at Bressler for the first two summers. He passed the New York and New Jersey bar examinations during the 2004 MLL season and subsequently began full-time employment at Bressler in September 2004.

== Personal ==
Massey was a regular surfer on the Jersey Shore during his time at Princeton.
