= Jon Hess (lacrosse) =

Lacrosse player

Personal information
- Nationality: American
- Website: NLL webpage

Sport
- Position: Attackman
- NLL draft: 23rd overall, 1998; New York Saints
- NLL teams: New York Saints (1999–2000)
- MLL teams: New Jersey Pride (2001–2003)
- NCAA team: Princeton University
- Pro career: 1999–2003

Career highlights
- College highlights: Jack Turnbull Award (1997); Men's Ivy League Player of the Year (1997); All-American 3x (1st team: 1997 & 1998; 2nd team: 1996); NCAA Men's Lacrosse Championship (1996, 1997 & 1998); NCAA Men's Lacrosse Championship Most Outstanding Player (1997); Records: Princeton single-season points (74, 1997–present); Princeton single-season assists (48, 1997–present); Professional highlights: Major League Lacrosse Iron Lizard of the Year Award (2003); Major League Lacrosse Assists champion (2001)

Jonathan A. "Jon" Hess is a retired lacrosse attackman who played professional box lacrosse in the National Lacrosse League (NLL), and professional field lacrosse in Major League Lacrosse (MLL). He starred as a member of the Princeton Tigers men's lacrosse team from 1995 through 1998, where he earned National Collegiate Athletic Association (NCAA) lacrosse attackman of the year award, three United States Intercollegiate Lacrosse Association (USILA) All-American recognitions, four Ivy League championships, three national championships, an Ivy League Player of the Year award, and an NCAA tournament most outstanding player award. Hess holds Princeton lacrosse scoring records for both points and assists, and won an NCAA individual national statistical championship for assists. As a professional, he is a former sportsman of the year and MLL assists leader.

== Early and personal life ==
Hess, who is from Nyack, New York, established the Rockland County scoring record (314 points). He attended Nyack High School, where he earned All-county recognition three times, but was unable to lead them past perennial league champion Yorktown High School. Hess was an Empire State Games gold medalist in 1992 and bronze medalist in 1993.

He is married to three-time soccer All-American and 2000 Olympic Games silver medalist, and former New York Power player, Sara Whalen Hess.

== College career ==
Hess was part of a trio of noted attackmen who were Princeton classmates along with Jesse Hubbard and Chris Massey. As starters, the trio of All-Americans, who retired second (Hess), third (Hubbard) and fourth (Massey) in career points at Princeton, had a 43–2 record and combined for 618 points. Hess was awarded the 1997 Jack Turnbull Award as the best NCAA lacrosse attackman. He was a first team USILA All-American Team selection in 1997 and 1998 and second team selection in 1996. He was also first team All-Ivy League in 1996 and 1997 and a second team selection in 1998. The 1995 team, which earned the school's sixth consecutive NCAA Men's Lacrosse Championship invitation, was Ivy League co-champion, while the 1996–1998 teams were 6–0 undefeated outright conference champions. These undefeated league champions won the 1996, 1997 and 1998 NCAA Division I Men's Lacrosse Championships, becoming the first team to win three consecutive championships since Syracuse from 1988–90 and the first to be recognized to have done so without an NCAA scandal since Johns Hopkins from 1978–80.

Hess earned the 1997 Men's Ivy League Player of the Year and the 1997 NCAA Division I Men's Lacrosse Championship tournament Most Outstanding Player. His most outstanding player performance included five goals and eleven assists in the tournament and three goals and five assists in the championship game against Maryland. The 1997 team is regarded as the best in school history with a record number of wins during its 15–0 season. He served as co-captain of the 1998 team, and he scored two second half goals and had an assist as Princeton pushed its lead to 7–3 during the 1998 Championship game. For the day, he ended up with four goals as part of the 15–5 victory over Maryland.

Hess holds the Princeton University single-season points (74, 1997) and single-season assists records (48, 1997). He was the 1998 NCAA statistical champion in assists per game (2.60), even though he was slowed down that season by a hamstring injury.

=== Princeton University ===
Season	GP	G	A	Pts	PPG
1995	15	12	17	29	--
1996	15	30	29	59	3.9
1997	15	26	48	74	4.9
1998	15	14	39	53	3.5
Totals	60	82	133	215	3.59

== Professional career ==
Hess played for the New York Saints during the 1999 and 2000 NLL seasons. Hess also played three seasons in MLL with the New Jersey Pride from 2001 to 2003 before retiring to work for Merrill Lynch in New York City. Hess works as a NASDAQ stock trader. With the Pride, he won the Major League Lacrosse Iron Lizard of the Year Award during the 2003 MLL season. That year, he was reunited with Princeton teammate Hubbard. In each of his three seasons in the MLL, he finished first (2001) or second (2002 & 2003) in the league in assists.

Preceded by Michael Watson	Jack Turnbull Award; 1997	Succeeded by Casey Powell
Preceded by Mike Eckert/Jesse Hubbard	Ivy League Men's Lacrosse Player of the Year; 1997	Succeeded by Mike Ferrucci
Preceded by Michael Watson	NCAA Men's Lacrosse Championship Most Outstanding Player; 1997	Succeeded by Corey Popham
Preceded by Inaugural season	MLL Regular season assists leader 2001	Succeeded by Casey Powell
Preceded by Paul Cantabene	Major League Lacrosse Iron Lizard of the Year Award; 2003	Succeeded by discontinued
Preceded by New league	Major League Lacrosse all-time single-season assists leader 2001–2003 (39)	Succeeded by Connor Gill
Preceded by New league	Major League Lacrosse all-time career assists leader 2001–2004 (100)	Succeeded by Casey Powell
