= Doug Knight =

American lacrosse player

Personal information
- Nationality: American
- Height: 5 ft 10 in (178 cm)
- Weight: 190 lb (86 kg; 13 st 8 lb)

Sport
- Position: Attack
- Shoots: Left
- NCAA team: University of Virginia
- NLL draft: 33rd overall, 1997; Baltimore Thunder
- MLL teams: Boston Cannons; Philadelphia Barrage
- Pro career: 2000–2007

Doug Knight is an American lacrosse player who had a standout collegiate career at the University of Virginia, where he set numerous scoring records. He was inducted into the National Lacrosse Hall of Fame in 2017.

== High school and collegiate career ==
A native of Katonah, New York, Knight attended Hackley School in Tarrytown NY through the 10th grade and then attended prep school at the Westminster School in Connecticut, where he excelled in lacrosse, soccer, and ice hockey and was selected as a high school lacrosse All-American.

Knight played attack at the University of Virginia from 1994 to 1997, where he set numerous scoring records and was named a three time All-American, as a Second Team selection in 1995 and a First Team selection in 1996 and 1997. In 1996, Knight led the nation in scoring with 56 goals and 30 assists for 86 total points. That year, the USILA selected him as Player of the Year in Division I, awarding him the Lt. Raymond Enners Award. Knight was a member of two Virginia squads that advanced to the NCAA championship game, one in 1994 and one in 1996. Both title games ended with Princeton University defeating Virginia by one goal in overtime.

Knight is a member of the University of Virginia Hall of Fame. He was the all-time career scoring leader for the Virginia Cavaliers with 165 goals and 84 assists for 249 points (60 games) until that total was surpassed by Steele Stanwick in 2012. Knight's nation-leading 56 goals in 1996 was a school record for most goals in a season until broken by Xander Dickson in 2023, and was also an Atlantic Coast Conference record until that number was surpassed in 2007 by Duke attackman Zack Greer. Knight is also tied with two other Cavaliers (Garrett Billings and Butch McCleary) for having scored the most Virginia goals in a single game, with eight goals versus Syracuse in 1996. He holds the Virginia records for highest average goals per game in a season with 3.7 goals in 1996, most consecutive games with goals scored at 39 games, and most games in a career with goals scored at 55 games (tied with Matt Ward). In 2002, Knight was selected as one of the 50 greatest lacrosse players in ACC history when he was picked as a member of the ACC 50th Anniversary Men's Lacrosse Team. The Virginia attack unit consisting of Knight, Michael Watson, and Tim Whiteley is regarded as among the best of all time, leading the nation in offensive output and setting several ACC records.

Knight, along with Virginia teammate Michael Watson, is credited with popularizing "the dive" or "the dive shot," an acrobatic move where an offensive player attacks the goal from behind the net by diving airborne through the goal crease while shooting the ball at the goal while in mid-air. The NCAA subsequently banned this practice in 1998 due to safety concerns and difficulty in officiating the play.

== Professional career ==
Upon graduation, Knight briefly played professional indoor lacrosse in the National Lacrosse League for the Rochester Knighthawks and the Baltimore Thunder. He also played professional outdoor lacrosse in the Major League Lacrosse for the Boston Cannons and the Philadelphia Barrage, where he tallied 22 goals and 16 assists in 18 games.

Knight has also served as an assistant lacrosse coach at the University of Virginia, St. Paul's School, Haverford School, and the University of Pennsylvania.

== Statistics ==
=== University of Virginia ===
Season	GP	G	A	Pts	PPG
1994	16	18	7	25	--
1995	15	52	14	66	--
1996	15	56	30	86	--
1997	14	39	33	72	--
Totals	60	165	84	249	--

=== MLL ===
		Regular Season						Playoffs
Season	Team	GP	G	A	Pts	LB	PIM	GP	G	A	Pts	LB	PIM
2001	Boston	10	13	8	21	18	--	--	--	--	--	--	--
2005	Philadelphia	4	6	5	8	0	--	--	--	--	--	--	--
2007	Philadelphia	4	2	3	5	5	--	--	--	--	--	--	--
MLL Totals		18	21	16	37	21	0	0	0	0	0	0	0
