= St. Paul's School for Girls (Maryland) =

School in Brooklandville, Maryland, US

Location
- Brooklandville, MD; USA; 39°25′39.5″N 76°40′36.4″W

Information
- Type: Private, Day
- Religious affiliation: Episcopal
- Established: 1959
- Sister school: St. Paul's School for Boys
- Head of School: Ereni Gleason Malfa '89
- Faculty: 68
- Gender: Girls
- Enrollment: 484
- Campus: Suburban, 38 acres
- Colors: Green and white
- Mascot: Gator
- Website: https://www.stpaulsmd.org/girls

St. Paul's School for Girls (grades 5–12) is an independent college-preparatory school in Brooklandville, Maryland, founded in 1959 to replace an older girls' school which had been closed.

St. Paul's School for Girls shares a campus with St. Paul's School for Boys (all boys, grades 5–12), founded in 1849, and with St. Paul's Pre and Lower School (coed, six weeks through grade 4). In July 2018, the schools unified under the umbrella of The St. Paul's Schools, with a single board of trustees and one president, but each school retains its individual traditions and its gender-specific programs.

== Location ==
The school is situated on a rural campus in the Green Spring Valley, about ten miles (16 km) north of the city of Baltimore.

== History ==
The girls' school traces its roots to 1799 when the Benevolent Society of the City and County of Baltimore, founded by a group of parishioners from Old St. Paul's Church, established an institution for the care and education of indigent or orphaned girls.

During the 1800s and 1900s, the school closed and reopened several times with different names and in different locations. In 1958, members of the Benevolent Society voted to establish a new college-preparatory school, which opened officially in 1959 (on a site adjacent to St. Paul's School for Boys).

The school's signature academic programs including SPIRITUS Scholars, a two-year exploratory program for juniors and seniors.

The school was approved for international students under the Student and Exchange Visitor Program in 2003.

The school was designated a Green School in September 2007 by the Maryland Association for Environmental and Outdoor Education.

On July 1, 2019, Ereni Gleason Malfa '89 was named the eleventh head of school, becoming the first alumna to lead the institution.

=== Heads of School ===
- Rosalind Levering
- Mary Frances Wagley
- Mary Ellen Thomsen
- Lila Lohr
- Dr. Evelyn A. Flory
- Nancy Laufe Eisenberg
- Michael Eanes (interim head)
- Monica M. Gillespie, Ph.D.
- Lila Lohr (interim head)
- Penny Bach Evins
- Ereni Gleason Malfa '89 (first alumnae Head of School)

== Athletics ==
SPSG currently fields 37 athletic teams throughout the year at the Middle School and Upper School levels. Sixty-two percent of students participate in at least one program.

In 2019, the school's varsity teams earned IAAM B Conference championships in softball, swimming, badminton, and basketball.

The volleyball team finished #1 in the state in 2007. They won the A conference IAAM championship, which they had also won in 2005, against rival Spalding, 3–0.

In 2022 and 2024, the varsity lacrosse team won IAAM A Conference championships defeating Glenelg Country School and McDonough.

== Notable alumni ==
- Maeve Kennedy Townsend McKean, American attorney and health official
