= David Robert Fetters =

American collegiate athlete and World War II veteran

David Robert "Bob" Fetters
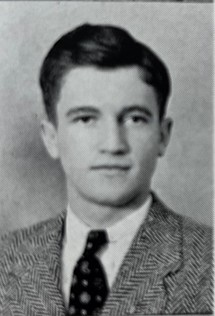
- Bob Fetters, Baltimore Polytechnic Institute, 1939
- Born: April 3, 1921; Baltimore, Maryland, US
- Died: December 10, 1989 (aged 68); Holland, Michigan, US
- Known for: 1946 Schmeisser Award winner

David Robert "Bob" Fetters (April 3, 1921 – December 10, 1989) was an American multi-sport collegiate athlete and World War II veteran. Born in Baltimore, Maryland, he competed for the University of Maryland, College Park and is best known as the 1946 winner of the Schmeisser Award, presented annually by the United States Intercollegiate Lacrosse Association (USILA) to the most outstanding defenseman in American collegiate men's lacrosse. A four-sport contributor at Maryland, Fetters also earned All-Eastern recognition as a soccer goalkeeper, was named to the USILA First Team All-America squad in 1946, and served as a Lieutenant in the United States Army Air Forces during World War II, including service in the China-Burma-India (CBI) theater, part of the Asiatic-Pacific Theater.

== Early life ==
David Robert Fetters was born on April 3, 1921, in Baltimore, Maryland, to David S. Fetters and M. Grace Nave. He grew up in a row house at 2310 Aiken Street, Baltimore. His father worked for the Baltimore and Ohio Railroad, and the family was active in the North Avenue Methodist Episcopal Church. Fetters attended Baltimore Polytechnic Institute, where he was a multi-sport athlete and campus leader. He served as Business Manager of the Poly Press school newspaper, which earned the highest rating possible in a national competition for high school papers. He also served on the Student Council and was a member of the Stagecraft Club and Poly Cracker yearbook. Athletically, he played soccer as goalkeeper, J.V. Football, Third Year Baseball, and Intramurals. The Poly soccer team shared the city championship during his senior year, with Fetters described as 'well chosen for the job of goalie.'

He enrolled at the University of Maryland, College Park in 1939 as a member of the Class of 1943, studying in the College of Engineering and earning a Bachelor of Science degree. In the Reserve Officers' Training Corps (ROTC), he attained the rank of captain. He was also a member of Scabbard and Blade, the honorary military fraternity for distinguished ROTC cadets. He earned varsity letters in lacrosse, soccer, and basketball, and was listed among the Wearers of the 'M' — the university's varsity lettermen. He played softball with Alpha Gamma Rho fraternity but was not a member of the organization. He stood 6 feet 3½ inches tall — earning him the campus nickname 'Stretch' — and weighed approximately 180 pounds, described in contemporary press as 'tall and agile' and 'rangy, shifty, and heady.' He was a member of the American Society of Mechanical Engineers (ASME).

== Athletic career ==
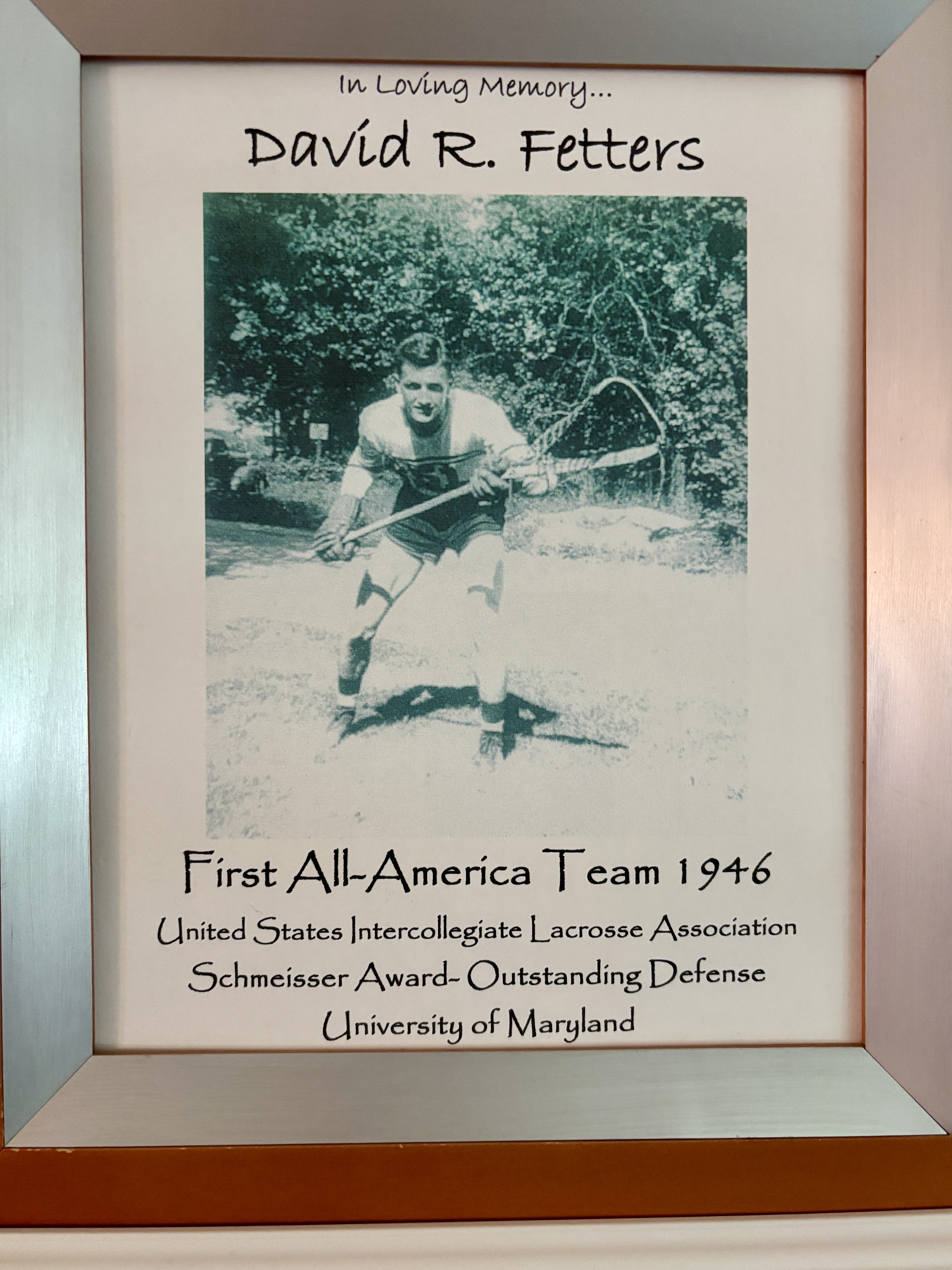
Bob Fetters, University of Maryland, 1946 First Team All-American and Schmeisser Award winner

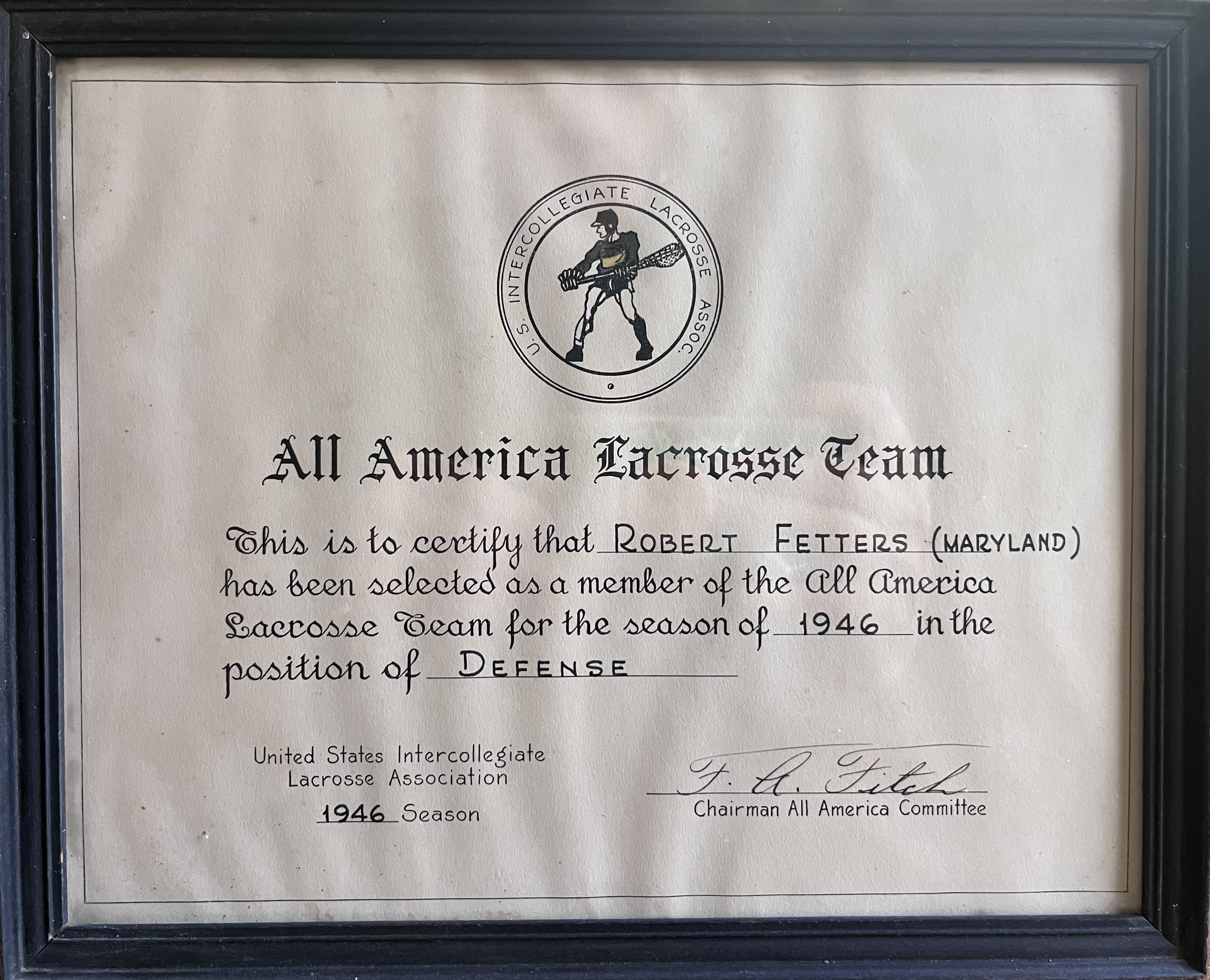
1946 USILA All America Lacrosse Team certificate awarded to Robert Fetters, University of Maryland

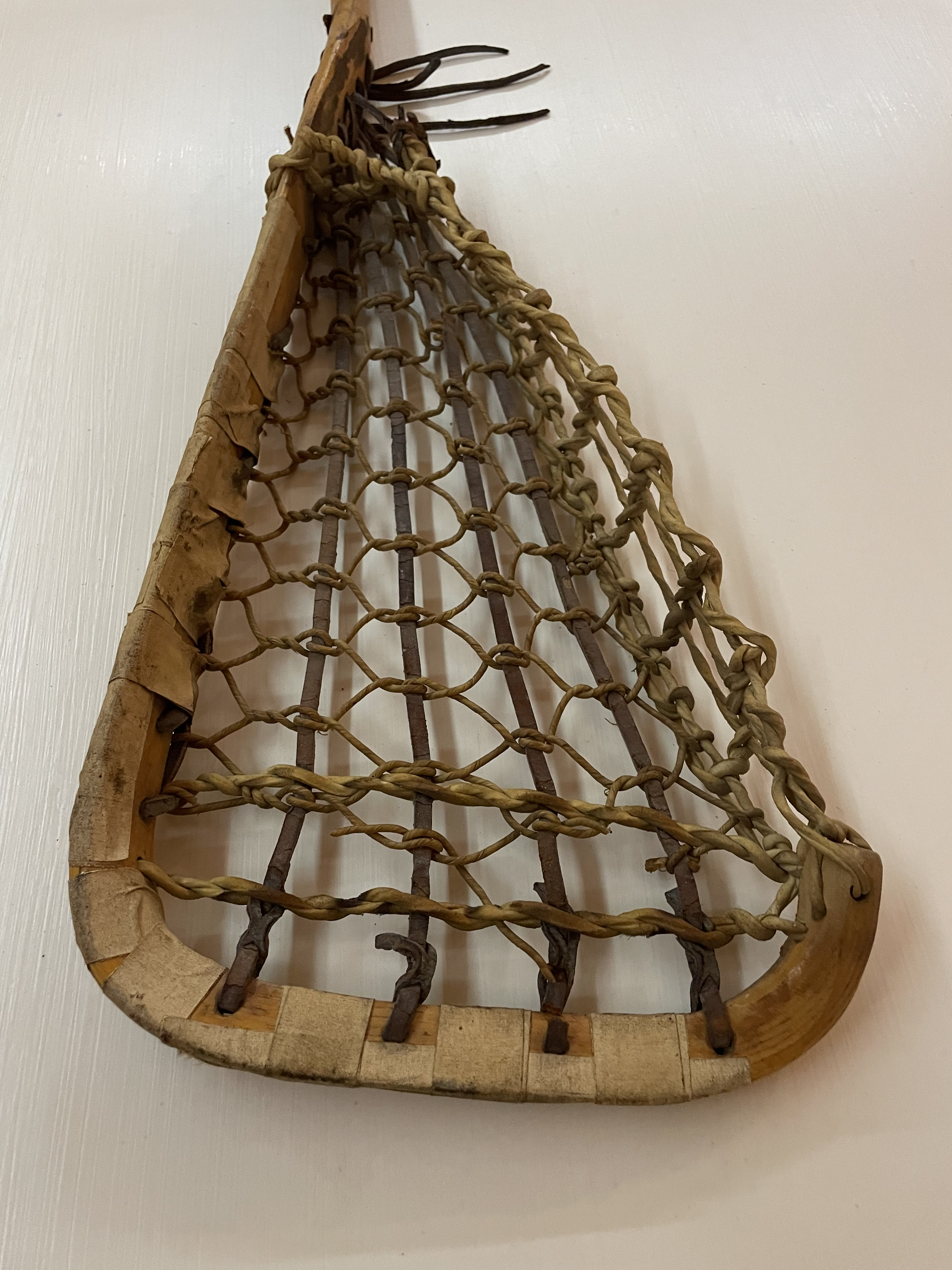
Lacrosse stick used by Bob Fetters at the University of Maryland, c. 1946. Donated to the UMD Hornbake Library for permanent preservation.

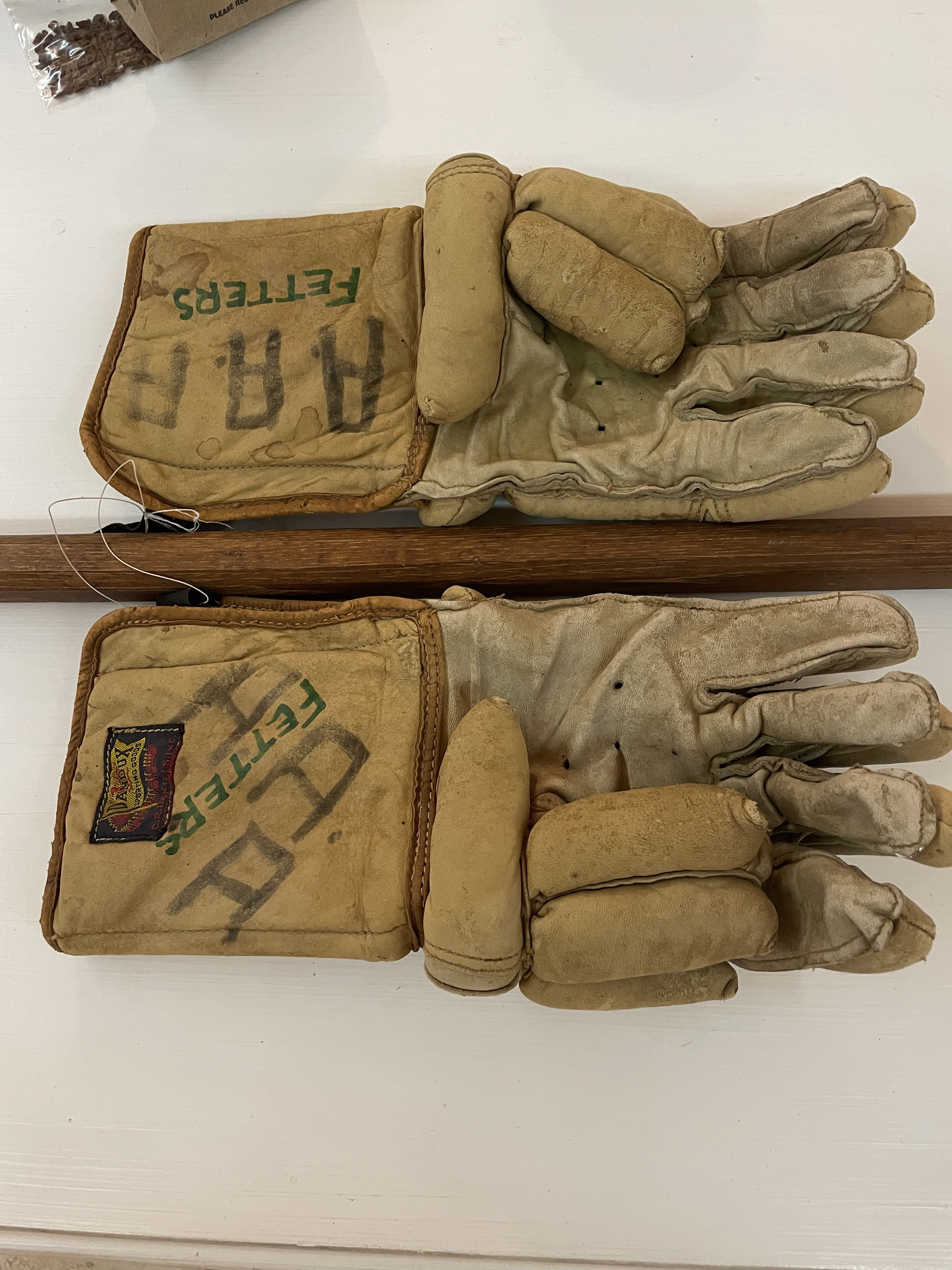
Lacrosse gloves used by Bob Fetters at the University of Maryland, c. 1946, with "FETTERS" marked in ink. Donated to the UMD Hornbake Library for permanent preservation.

=== Lacrosse ===
Fetters played close defense for the Maryland Terrapins men's lacrosse team under coach Jack Faber, beginning in 1939 when coach Al Heagy persuaded him to try the game — having seen it played only once before. He resumed play upon his return from military service. He was described as the 'keystone of the defense,' 'a towering defense man,' and 'one of the outstanding defensive men in the game today.' In 1941, Fetters was named to the Second Team of The Sun's All-Maryland Lacrosse squad at the close-point position. He was also selected for the South squad in the annual North-South All-Star lacrosse game at Homewood Field in Baltimore, a contest that ended in a 14–14 overtime tie.

In 1946, Fetters was awarded the Schmeisser Award at the USILA's 64th Annual Convention in New York City on December 14, 1946. He was simultaneously named to the USILA First Team All-America squad for 1946, listed at the Point position alongside goalie Jerry Courtney of Johns Hopkins, receiving two separate All-American certificates issued by the USILA. His name is recorded in the University of Maryland Lacrosse Honor Roll.

The physical Schmeisser Trophy was a rotating award retained by the winning college rather than the individual recipient; Fetters received a framed certificate (Shingle) in its place. In December 1966, Fetters was invited back to New York City for the USILA Annual All-American Dinner and Reunion honoring the 1946 All-American team at the Hotel Manhattan. In May 1975, he was invited by Al Heagy — the coach who had first introduced him to lacrosse in 1939 — to be formally recognized at Byrd Stadium during the Maryland vs. Johns Hopkins game as part of the University of Maryland Lacrosse Honor Roll ceremony.

=== Soccer ===
Fetters served as starting goalkeeper for the Maryland Terrapins soccer team, earning All-Eastern recognition. During the 1941 season, the Terrapins went undefeated — winning eight matches and tying two — and were rated one of only two undefeated college teams in the country. Maryland won the Tri-State Soccer League championship and claimed the mythical State Championship. Fetters allowed only two goals the entire season, a record described as 'unequaled anywhere in the country.'

=== Basketball ===
Fetters earned his basketball letter on the 1941 Maryland Terrapins squad and played center for the team, described during his military service as a 'big center.' In one notable contest against Carolina, he held George Glamack — whose scoring average was 22 points per game — to just 10 points.

=== Softball ===
Fetters was named to the All-Campus softball team as pitcher for Alpha Gamma Rho, leading the fraternity to the campus softball championship with a shutout in the deciding game.

== Military service ==
Fetters was called to active duty in February 1943 and attended Officer Candidate School. He had initially hoped to qualify as an Army Air Corps pilot but was not selected due to his need for corrective eyeglasses. He served as a Lieutenant with the Headquarters Squadron, 20th Ferrying Group, Air Transport Command, stationed initially in Nashville, Tennessee, before being deployed to the China-Burma-India (CBI) theater, part of the Asiatic-Pacific Theater, during World War II. During his stateside service in Nashville, Fetters played basketball in the Enlisted Men's League, frequently leading his Headquarters Squadron team in scoring. While serving in India, Fetters re-enlisted for an additional year, which entitled him to a 45-day leave back to the United States in May 1945. He calculated that the war would end before his leave expired — a bet that proved correct, as Japan surrendered that August. His discharge came in September 1945, just two days before the start of the fall semester.

He subsequently resumed his studies at the University of Maryland, completing his degree in mechanical engineering.

== Personal life ==
Fetters met Eleanor Reid in January 1943 at the wedding of his close friend and fellow ROTC Captain Ulrich A. Geller — where Eleanor was the soloist and Fetters was the best man. After he was called to active duty, the two married on July 22, 1943, in a spontaneous ceremony after Fetters called Eleanor and said, 'Let's get married right now.' The couple lived in Mobile, Alabama, and Nashville, Tennessee, until Fetters was deployed to India. Eleanor moved back to Washington, D.C. during her pregnancy, and their first child, David Michael Fetters, was born on November 6, 1944. After the war, the family settled in Holland, Michigan, where they raised eight children: David (born 1944), Suzanne (born 1946), Daniel (born 1948), Richard (born 1952), Robert (born 1954), Paul (born 1956), Peter (born 1959), and Sandra (born 1963). Fetters died on December 10, 1989.

== Post-collegiate athletics ==
After his college career, Fetters played for the Spring Lake Ex-Servicemen softball team and later for Kellers in the local Class B softball league in Michigan, where he pitched a no-hitter and finished second in the league batting race with a .427 average in 1952. He also played for the Parke-Davis softball team in the Wooden Shoe League, part of the Holland Recreation Department fast-pitch program, where the team won the league championship with a 12–2 season record. In one contest, Fetters pitched a three-hitter and added two hits at the plate in an 8–1 victory over Elhart Pontiac. He also played for the Anderson-Bolling basketball squad, which won the Grand Haven City League championship for two consecutive seasons.

He also continued playing soccer in Michigan, serving as goalkeeper for the Dunn Hotspurs in the West Michigan Soccer League, a club based in Holland, Michigan.

== Legacy ==
Fetters is listed in the University of Maryland Lacrosse Honor Roll for 1946. His 1946 Schmeisser Award places him among the most decorated defensive lacrosse players in the history of the sport.

In the early 1980s, Fetters was asked by Hope College in Holland, Michigan to serve as a referee for their lacrosse games, reflecting the lasting regard in which he was held within the sport decades after his playing career ended. His personal lacrosse equipment from his playing days — including his wooden lacrosse stick and leather gloves, with his name hand-written on them — has been donated to the University of Maryland's Hornbake Library and entrusted to University Archivist Lae'l Hughes-Watkins for permanent preservation in the university's special collections.

Despite his considerable athletic achievements, Fetters was known among his family as a modest and private man who rarely spoke of his accolades. His personal scrapbook of clippings and awards, assembled during his playing years, was largely unknown to his children until discovered later in life.
