= Boys' Latin School of Maryland =

Coordinates: 39.372407°N 76.63626°W

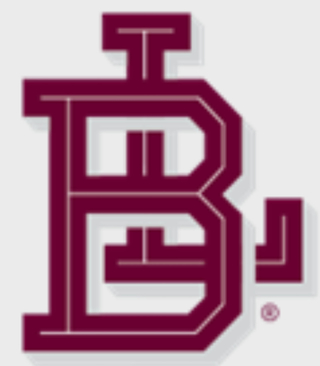

Location
- 822 W. Lake Avenue; Baltimore, Maryland; United States

Information
- Type: Private, All-boys Day, K-12 (education)
- Motto: Esse Quam Videri (to be, rather than to seem)
- Established: 1844; 182 years ago
- Headmaster: Christopher Post
- Faculty: 81
- Enrollment: 600 total (300 9-12)
- Average class size: 14 students
- Student to teacher ratio: 7:1
- Campus: Suburban, 41 acres (170,000 m^{2})
- Colors: Maroon and White
- Athletics conference: MIAA
- Mascot: Laker
- Rival: St. Paul's
- Newspaper: "The Inkwell"
- Website: boyslatinmd.com

Boys' Latin School of Maryland is an all-boys, university-preparatory school located in Baltimore, Maryland. Founded in 1844, it is the oldest independent, nonsectarian secondary school in the state of Maryland. The school is divided into Lower, Middle and Upper Schools. There are approximately 640 students in kindergarten through twelfth grades.

== History ==
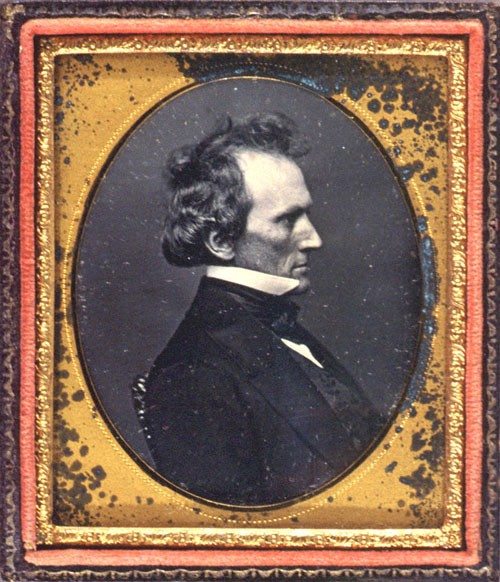
A quarter plate daguerreotype (ca. 1850s) of Evert Marsh Topping, Boys' Latin School founder

Boys' Latin was founded in 1844 by Evert Marsh Topping, a former classics professor from Princeton University. The school was located in a downtown housing project (on Brevard Street) until the late 1950s, when its site was selected as part of a city-sponsored urban renewal project. The school relocated to its present 42-acre (170,000 m^{2}) campus spanning Lake Avenue, on the border between Baltimore and Baltimore County, in Roland Park, Baltimore, in the 1960s. On February 11, 2020, plans were announced to add a boarding school, in conjunction with the acquisition of an additional 28-acre (110,000 m^{2}) parcel for student housing, beginning in 2021. The existing structures on the newly acquired property were renovated, providing space for up to 40 boys to be accommodated as residents, with multiple apartments for faculty and staff and on-site dining services.

== Academics ==
The faculty has an average of 13 years of teaching experience and 60% hold an advanced degree. With a student to faculty ratio of 8:1, class sizes are small and offer many opportunities for individual interaction with the teacher and for student-centered activities. In addition to the care and instruction of classroom teachers, students in the Middle and Upper Schools are assigned to faculty advisers who monitor their academic and social development. Skills are woven throughout the curriculum. Educational Support Services (ESS) provides learning and teaching support in all divisions.

The Lower School begins with Kindergarten classes where students are first exposed to the Wilson Foundation system of language education. In addition to classes with their homeroom teacher in reading, the language arts, social sciences, and math, students have classes with specialized teachers for the beginning of their education in music, art, Spanish, music, science, technology, and physical education.

The Middle School offers traditional classes such as algebra, life sciences, and English, but there are also classes in life-skills such as decision making, desktop publishing, research, and independent reading. Students begin a formal, daily study of foreign language in the seventh grade with Latin and Spanish. In the eighth grade, students may elect to continue with the study of Latin or Spanish, or students may choose to study French. The eighth grade also presents an opportunity for students to develop public speaking skills: a formally prepared speech is part of their curriculum.

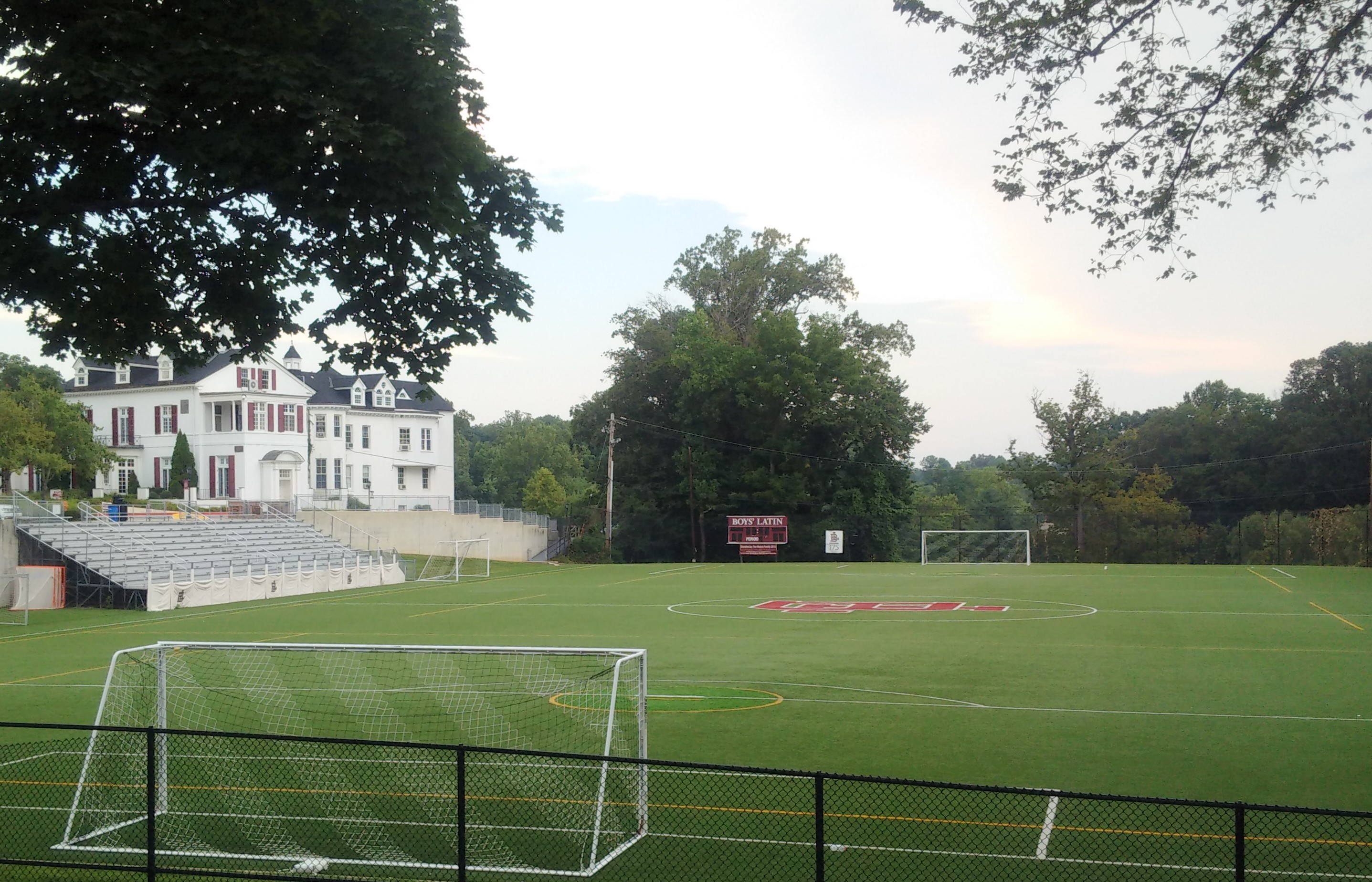
Part of the Upper School campus and athletic field

As a college preparatory school, the Upper School has a graduation requirement of several credits in English, math, history, science, and foreign languages to ensure that students are thoroughly prepared for the independent study required in college. Additionally, students are required to take courses in physical education and health education, and the fine arts. There are also a wide variety of electives, and Advanced Placement (AP) courses are offered in thirteen subjects including calculus, statistics, physics, chemistry, biology, U.S. history, and English literature. The Williams Scholars Program provides incentives for academic achievement, including a stipend for summer educational programs.

The Upper School offers opportunities in the fine and performing arts, including studio art, painting, music & music composition, digital media, and drama & cinema classes. Private instrumental music lessons are available K-12, and musical productions & art showcases throughout the year display students' achievements. The Upper School presents drama productions in the winter and spring, and each year a senior is chosen to direct the spring production. After working through a multi-draft writing process and attending several coaching sessions on presenting skills, all seniors are required to deliver a senior speech to the entire upper school. There is a wealth of club and co-curricular activities, ranging from chess clubs and mock trial teams to digital photography and student newspaper publications available to all students. Boys' Latin is the first independent private school in the nation to incorporate a club dedicated to the One Love Foundation. The One Love club is the most popular club in the Upper School, and the club sponsors an annual, K-12 One Laker | One Love Day. Boys' Latin is recognized as a HERO Certified School by the One Love Foundation.

== Athletics ==
Boys' Latin's sports teams are known as the Lakers. Boys' Latin is known for its lacrosse program; the Lakers play in the Maryland Interscholastic Athletic Association "A" Conference, one of the most competitive high school lacrosse leagues in the nation. They have currently 27 Division 1 players. In 2006, the Lakers completed an undefeated 21-0 championship season and were named the #1 high school lacrosse team in the United States, an honor the school also accomplished in 1985, 1988, 1997, and 2014.

== Notable alumni ==
- Hanson W. Baldwin – military editor for The New York Times and Pulitzer Prize winner
- Alfred H. Barr, Jr. – former director of the Museum of Modern Art in New York City.
- Justin Boston – professional stock car driver
- Victor Dimukeje – NFL linebacker
- Brian Farrell – professional lacrosse player and coach
- John Glatzel – professional lacrosse player
- Calvin Goddard – ballistics expert, forensic scientist, army officer
- Guy T. O. Hollyday – served as commissioner of Federal Housing Administration
- Joseph Iglehart – investment banker, baseball executive
- G. Lewis Jones – American diplomat
- Brian Kowitz – former MLB player for the Atlanta Braves
- Edmund C. Lynch – co-founder of Merrill Lynch
- Keiffer J. Mitchell, Jr. – politician
- Ryan Mollett – professional lacrosse player
- Eric Papenfuse – mayor of Harrisburg
- Francis Hopkinson Smith – author, artist, engineer, descendant of Francis Hopkinson
- John Waters – filmmaker and actor
