= Mitch Belisle =

American lacrosse player

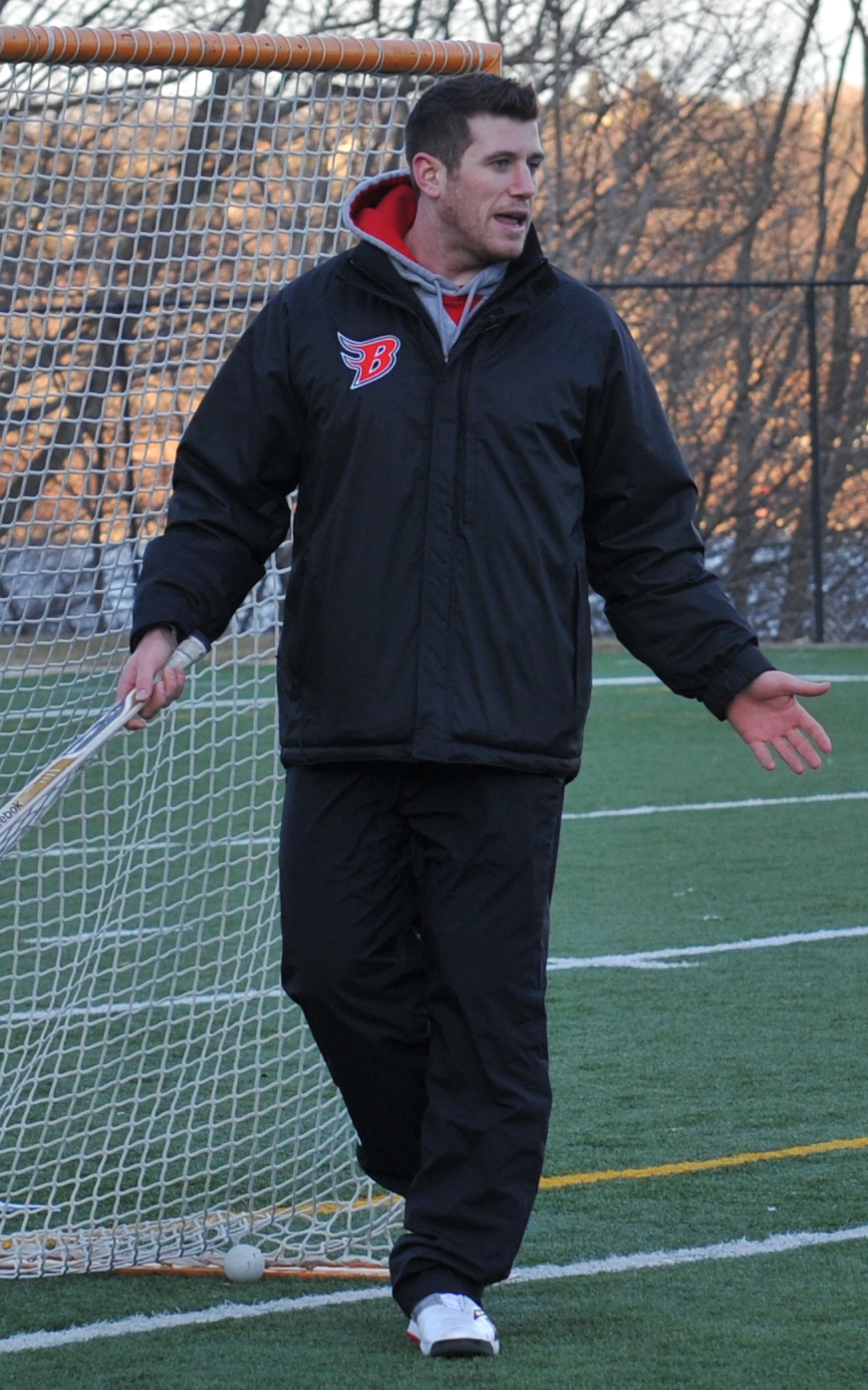
- Belisle in 2010

Personal information
- Nationality: American
- Born: November 9, 1985 (age 40)
- Height: 5 ft 10 in (178 cm)
- Weight: 190 lb (86 kg; 13 st 8 lb)

Sport
- Position: Defense
- NLL draft: 13th overall, 2007; New York Titans
- NLL team Former teams: Georgia Swarm; Minnesota Swarm; Boston Blazers; New York Titans
- MLL team: Boston Cannons
- NCAA team: Cornell University
- Pro career: 2007–2018

Mitchell Dye Belisle (born November 9, 1985) is an American former professional lacrosse player for the Boston Cannons of Major League Lacrosse and former player for the Georgia Swarm in the National Lacrosse League. Belisle represented the United States in the 2014 FIL World Championship and the 2011 FIL World Indoor Championship.

== Collegiate career ==
Belisle is a graduate of Cornell University and a member of the Cornell Athletics Hall of Fame. As a senior he was awarded the Schmeisser Award as the nation's top defender. He also received First-team All-American team honors, and was named to his second All-Ivy League team while leading the Big Red to the 2007 NCAA Division I Men's Lacrosse Championship Final Four. As a junior, he was awarded Cornell's "C.F. Morse Lacrosse Scholar-Athlete of the Year Award." Belisle was elected to the Sphinx Head Society, the oldest senior society at Cornell.

== Professional career ==
Belisle was selected by the Los Angeles Riptide as a second round selection (12th overall) in the 2007 Major League Lacrosse Collegiate Draft.

The New York Titans drafted Belisle in the First Round (13th overall) in the 2007 National Lacrosse League Entry Draft. In Week 13 of the 2008 NLL season, Belisle scored his first and second career goals, and was awarded "Transition Player of the Week" honors.

Belisle joined the Boston Blazers for their inaugural season during the 2009 NLL season. During the season, he was named a reserve to the All-Star game.

He played in the 2012 and 2013 NLL seasons for the Minnesota Swarm. He was listed Inactive: Protected Player on December 7, 2013 and missed the 2014 NLL season. He returned to the Swarm for the 2015 and 2016 seasons.

In addition to his professional career as a player, Belisle serves as the Director of Marketing for Trilogy Lacrosse, a leading lacrosse education organization based in Brooklyn, New York.

== Statistics ==
=== NLL ===
		Regular Season						Playoffs
Season	Team	GP	G	A	Pts	LB	PIM	GP	G	A	Pts	LB	PIM
2008	New York	12	2	2	4	48	16	2	0	2	2	9	2
2009	Boston	16	3	4	7	104	14	1	0	1	1	4	0
2010	Boston	16	2	5	7	101	12	1	0	1	1	12	0
2011	Boston	16	2	2	4	70	30	1	0	1	1	5	4
2012	Minnesota	15	0	4	4	57	28	1	0	0	0	4	0
2013	Minnesota	16	1	10	11	60	10	2	0	0	0	13	4
2015	Minnesota	17	2	3	5	66	25	--	--	--	--	--	--
2016	Georgia	18	1	2	3	62	21	1	0	0	0	2	0
2017	Georgia	16	2	1	3	34	18	4	0	0	0	10	2
NLL totals		142	15	33	48	602	174	13	0	5	5	59	12

=== MLL ===
		Regular Season							Playoffs
Season	Team	GP	G	2ptG	A	Pts	LB	PIM	GP	G	2ptG	A	Pts	LB	PIM
2007	Los Angeles	9	0	0	0	0	14	5.5	2	0	0	0	0	3	1
2008	Los Angeles	11	0	0	0	0	18	0.5	1	0	0	0	0	0	0
2009	Boston	12	0	0	0	0	12	0.5	1	0	0	0	0	0	0
2010	Boston	12	1	0	0	1	12	4	1	0	0	0	0	0	0
2011	Boston	10	0	0	0	0	18	2	2	0	0	0	0	2	0
2012	Boston	11	0	0	0	0	20	4	1	0	0	0	0	1	0
2013	Boston	12	0	0	0	0	22	2.5	--	--	--	--	--	--	--
2014	Boston	13	1	0	0	1	24	6	--	--	--	--	--	--	--
2015	Boston	11	0	0	0	0	14	2.5	1	0	0	0	0	3	0
2016	Boston	11	1	0	0	1	15	4.5	--	--	--	--	--	--	--
2017	Boston	6	0	0	0	0	13	1.5	--	--	--	--	--	--	--
2018	Boston	14	0	0	0	0	31	1.5	--	--	--	--	--	--	--
MLL Totals		132	3	0	0	3	213	35	9	0	0	0	0	9	1

Preceded by Mike Culver	William C. Schmeisser Award; NCAA Defenseman of the Year; 2007	Succeeded by Nick O’Hara
