= Brian Farrell (lacrosse) =

American lacrosse player

Personal information
- Born: January 12, 1988 (age 38) Baltimore, Maryland, U.S.
- Height: 6 ft 5 in (196 cm)
- Weight: 240 lb (110 kg; 17 st 2 lb)

Sport
- Position: Defense
- MLL team Former teams: Ohio Machine; Boston Cannons; Chesapeake Bayhawks
- team: University of Maryland

Career highlights
- MLL champion (2011)

Brian Farrell is a former professional lacrosse player for the Ohio Machine of the MLL. He attended the University of Maryland and was a three-time USILA All-American defender and two-time captain for the Terrapins. He was a 2011 MLL Champion with the Boston Cannons and was traded to the Ohio Machine in 2013. After his professional lacrosse career he took a position as lacrosse coach at the Boys Latin School of Maryland.
