= 1994 NCAA Division II lacrosse tournament =

1994 NCAA Division II Lacrosse Championship
Tournament information
- Sport: College lacrosse
- Location: (New York (state)) Brookville, New York
- Host(s): C.W. Post College
- Venue(s): C.W. Post Stadium
- Participants: 2

Final positions
- Champions: Springfield (1st title)
- Runner-up: NYIT (1st final)

Tournament statistics
- Matches played: 1
- Goals scored: 27 (27 per match)
- Attendance: 709 (709 per match)
- Top scorer(s): Mark Anastas, Springfield (6); Gerald Mule, NYIT (6); Jared Smith, Springfield (6)

The 1994 NCAA Division II Lacrosse Championship was the tenth annual tournament to determine the national champions of NCAA Division II men's college lacrosse in the United States.

The final, and only match of the tournament, was played at C.W. Post Stadium at C.W. Post College in Brookville, New York.

Springfield defeated NYIT in the championship, 15–12, to claim the Pride's first Division II national title.

== Bracket ==
Championship
NYIT	12
Springfield	15

== See also ==
- 1994 NCAA Division I Men's Lacrosse Championship
- 1994 NCAA Division I Women's Lacrosse Championship
