= 1994 NCAA Division I men's lacrosse tournament =

- Teams: 12
- Finals site: Byrd Stadium, College Park, Maryland
- Champions: Princeton (2nd title)
- Runner-up: Virginia (4th title game)
- Semifinalists: Brown (1st Final Four); Syracuse (13th Final Four)
- Winning coach: Bill Tierney (2nd title)
- MOP: Scott Bacigalupo, Princeton
- Attendance: 23,728 semi-finals 24,730 finals 48,458 total
- Top scorer: Tim Whiteley, Virginia (19 goals)

The 1994 NCAA Division I lacrosse tournament was the 24th annual tournament hosted by the National Collegiate Athletic Association to determine the team champion of men's college lacrosse among its Division I programs, held at the end of the 1994 NCAA Division I men's lacrosse season.

The final match saw Princeton defeat Virginia, 9–8, with Kevin Lowe—brother of Hall-of-Fame lacrosse player Darren Lowe converting Jeff MacBean's pass forty-two seconds into overtime to win the game. This was the Tigers' second NCAA national championship and second under head coach Bill Tierney.

The championship game was played at Byrd Stadium at the University of Maryland in College Park, Maryland, with 24,730 fans in attendance.

== Qualifying ==
Twelve NCAA Division I college men's lacrosse teams met after having played their way through a regular season, and for some, a conference tournament.

No teams made their Division I men's lacrosse tournament debut in 1994.

== Bracket ==
First Round
8	Duke	14
Maryland	11
5	Virginia	23
Notre Dame	4
6	Johns Hopkins	22
Towson State	16
7	Brown	12
Navy	5

Quarterfinals
1	Syracuse	12
8	Duke	11
4	North Carolina	10
5	Virginia	12
6	Johns Hopkins	11
3	Princeton	12 *
2	Loyola Maryland	13
7	Brown	14 *

Semifinals
1	Syracuse	14
5	Virginia	15 *
3	Princeton	10
7	Brown	7

Final
5	Virginia	8
3	Princeton	9 *

- An asterisk indicates Overtime

== Box scores ==
=== Finals ===
==== #5 Virginia vs. #3 Princeton ====
Team	1	2	3	4	OT	Total
Princeton	2	2	2	2	1	9
Virginia	2	1	2	3	0	8
Princeton scoring – Scott Conklin 4, Scott Reinhardt 3, Paul Murphy, Kevin Lowe; Virginia scoring – Michael Watson 3, Doug Knight 2, Sean Miller, Greg Traynor, David Jones; Shots: Virginia 52, Princeton 45; Saves: Virginia James Ireland 15, Princeton Scott Bacigalupo 14; Attendance: 22,559

=== Semifinals ===
==== #1 Syracuse vs. #5 Virginia ====
Team	1	2	3	4	OT	Total
Virginia	1	5	1	7	1	15
Syracuse	5	3	4	2	0	14
Virginia scoring – Michael Watson 3, David Jones 3, Sean Miller 2, Tim Whiteley 2, Greg Traynor, Drew Fox, Chris Driggs, Brad Hoag, Doug Knight; Syracuse scoring – Dom Fin 3, Roy Colsey 3, Casey Donegan 3, Brian Eisenberg, Jim Morrissey, Charlie Lockwood, Rob Kavovit, Paul Sullivan; Shots: Virginia 56, Syracuse 36; Saves: Syracuse Alex Rosier 23, Virginia James Ireland 12, Court Durling 1; Attendance: 21,523

==== #3 Princeton vs. #7 Brown ====
Team	1	2	3	4	Total
Princeton	3	2	4	1	10
Brown	2	3	0	2	7
Princeton scoring – Scott Reinhardt 4, Brian Tomeo 2, Scott Conklin, Jason Buttles, Don McDonough, John; Stanitski: Brown scoring – Rob Gutheil 2, Tom Collard, Jim Gaensbauer, Chris Martinelli, David Evans, Dennis; Sullivan: Shots: Princeton 38, Brown 33; Saves: Princeton Scott Bacigalupo 15, Brown Jay Stalfort 14; Attendance: 21,523

=== Quarterfinals ===
==== #1 Syracuse vs. #8 Duke ====
Team	1	2	3	4	Total
Syracuse	3	3	3	3	12
Duke	4	3	2	2	11
Syracuse scoring – Dom Fin 3, Jim Morrissey 3, Matt Doyle, Mark Fietta, Charlie Lockwood, Rob Kavovit, Roy Colsey, Casey Donegan: Duke scoring – Mike Clayton 3, Ross Moscatelli 2, Scott Allen, Matt Oglesby, Steve Finnell, Jim Gonnella, Ken Fasanaro, James Heavey: Shots: Syracuse 65, Duke 47; Saves: Syracuse Alex Rosier 19 - Duke Joe Kirmser 19; Attendance: 4,427

==== #4 North Carolina vs. #5 Virginia ====
Team	1	2	3	4	Total
Virginia	1	5	2	4	12
North Carolina	3	2	2	3	10
Virginia scoring – David Jones 2, Sean Miller 2, Michael Watson 2, Tim Whiteley 2, Andrew Dausch, Chris; Driggs, Brad Hoag, Greg Traynor: North Carolina scoring – Wilson Felter 3, Brendan Carey 2, Ousmane Greene 2, Gregg Langhoff, Pete; Murphy, Ryan Wade: Shots: Virginia 46, North Carolina 42; Saves: North Carolina Rocco D’Andraia 14 - Virginia James Ireland 9; Attendance: 1,750

==== #3 Princeton vs. #6 Johns Hopkins ====
Team	1	2	3	4	OT	Total
Princeton	2	1	4	4	1	12
Johns Hopkins	1	5	2	3	0	11
Princeton scoring – Taylor Simmers 4, Scott Conklin 3, Scott Reinhardt 2, Kevin Lowe, Jason Buttles, Jason Osier; Johns Hopkins scoring – Todd Cavallaro 3, Dave Marr 2, Brian Piccola 2, Werner Krueger, Billy Evans, Terry Riordan, Milford Marchant; Shots: Princeton 42, Johns Hopkins 38; Saves: Princeton Scott Bacigalupo 13, Kevin Johnson 2 - Johns Hopkins Jonathan Marcus 13; Attendance: 4,796

==== #2 Loyola Maryland vs. #7 Brown ====
Team	1	2	3	4	OT	Total
Brown	5	3	3	2	1	14
Loyola Maryland	4	2	3	4	0	13
Brown scoring – Jeffrey Iserson 3, Chris Martinelli 2, Rob Gutheil 2, James Gaensbauer 2, Robin Prince 2, Brian McNally, Gary Nelson, David Evans; Loyola Maryland scoring – Zach Thornton 3, Andy Martin 3, Matt Dwan 2, Del Halladay 2, Sean Heffernan, Mark O’Brien, Brian Bacso: Shots: Loyola Maryland 50, Brown 37; Saves: Loyola Maryland Scott Tim McGenney 21 - Brown Jay Stalfort 16; Attendance: 2,006

=== First round ===
==== #8 Duke vs. Maryland ====
Team	1	2	3	4	Total
Duke	2	6	3	4	14
Maryland	5	0	1	5	11
Duke scoring – Ken Fasanaro 4, Scott Harrison 3, Ross Moscatelli 2, Mike Clayton 2, Ed Fay, Steve Finnell, James Heavey; Maryland scoring – Pete Hilgartner 2, Greg Nelin 2, Neal Dupcak, Rob Chomo, Chris Farmer, Matt Parks, Kip Fulks: Shots: Duke 52, Maryland 38; Saves: Duke Joe Kirmser 17 - Maryland Brian Dougherty 14; Attendance: 625

==== #5 Virginia vs. Notre Dame ====
Team	1	2	3	4	Total
Virginia	5	6	8	4	23
Notre Dame	1	1	1	1	4
Virginia scoring – Greg Traynor 3, Drew Fox 3, Tim Whiteley 2, Michael Vaughan 2, Doug Knight 2, Mark; LaVerghetta 2, Tony Nugent, Michael Watson, Sean Miller, Mark Dixon, Brad Hoag, David Jones, Kurt Mueller, Brian Birch, Ben Johnson, Chris Driggs: Notre Dame scoring – Robbie Snyder 2, Randy Colley, Mike Iorio; Shots: Virginia 55, Notre Dame 18; Saves: Notre Dame Ryan Jewell 6, Brian Sullivan 4 - Virginia James Ireland 3, Court; Durling 6 Attendance: 877

==== #6 Johns Hopkins vs. Towson State ====
Team	1	2	3	4	Total
Johns Hopkins	5	6	6	5	22
Towson State	2	5	6	3	16
Johns Hopkins scoring – Terry Riordan 4, Brian Piccola 4, Chris Macon 3, Casey Gordon 3, Milford Marchant 2, Todd Cavallaro 2, Dave Marr 2, Billy Evans, Pete Jacobs; Towson State scoring – David Quinn 4, Dudley Dixon 4, Tim Langton 3, Steve Carcaterra 2, Mark Goers, Stewart; Crotty, Kevin Krupinsky: Shots: Johns Hopkins 48, Towson State 48; Saves: Johns Hopkins Jonathan Marcus 17 - Towson State Brian Whalen 14; Attendance: 4,203

==== #7 Brown vs. Navy ====
Team	1	2	3	4	Total
Brown	2	3	5	2	12
Navy	1	1	0	3	5
Brown scoring – David Evans 5, Robin Prince 3, Jeffrey Iserson 3, Rob Gutheil; Navy scoring – Jamie Slough 2, Rich Costello, Rob Bailey, Justin Dunne; Shots: Navy 48, Brown 34; Saves: Brown Jay Stalfort 24 - Navy Garrett Luebker 13; Attendance: 1,597

== All-Tournament Team ==
- Scott Bacigalupo, Princeton (Named the tournament's Most Outstanding Player)

=== Leading scorers ===
Leading scorers	GP	G	A	Pts
Tim Whiteley, Virginia	4	6	13	19
Michael Watson, Virginia	4	9	3	12
Rob Gutheil, Brown	3	5	6	11
Sean Miller, Virginia	4	6	4	10
Scott Reinhardt, Princeton	3	9	1	10
David Evans, Brown	3	7	2	9
Dave Marr, Johns Hopkins	2	4	5	9
Taylor Simmers, Princeton	3	4	5	9
Greg Traynor, Virginia	4	6	3	9

== See also ==
- 1994 NCAA Division I women's lacrosse tournament
- 1994 NCAA Division II lacrosse tournament
- 1994 NCAA Division III men's lacrosse tournament
