= Pat McCabe (lacrosse) =

American lacrosse player

Personal information
- Nationality: American
- Born: April 15, 1969 (age 57)

Sport
- Position: Defense
- NLL teams: New York Saints
- MLL team: Long Island Lizards
- NCAA team: Syracuse University
- Pro career: 1992–2006

Patrick "Pat" J. McCabe (born April 15, 1969) is a retired professional lacrosse player from the United States. In 2006, McCabe was elected to the US Lacrosse Hall of Fame.

== College career ==
McCabe attended Syracuse University, where he was named All-American four times, including three times to the first team. Pat was also presented with the Schmeisser Award as the nations most outstanding defensive player in 1990. McCabe won three NCAA Championships at Syracuse.

== Professional career ==
McCabe played defense for the Long Island Lizards of Major League Lacrosse from the 2001 season until he retired following the 2006 season. He also played 11 seasons for the New York Saints of the National Lacrosse League (1992–2002), and was chosen to play on Team USA at the 2002 Heritage Cup. He also coached the Saints in 2003 and the Anaheim Storm in 2004.

== International career ==
As well as playing professionally, McCabe represented Team USA in international tournaments in 1988 with the under-19 National Team, and the 1998 and 2006 National Teams in the World Lacrosse Championships.

== Statistics ==
=== MLL ===
		Regular Season							Playoffs
Season	Team	GP	G	2ptG	A	Pts	LB	PIM	GP	G	2ptG	A	Pts	LB	PIM
2001	Long Island	14	1	0	1	2	31	2.5	2	0	0	0	0	10	0
2002	Long Island	14	0	0	0	0	49	3	2	0	0	1	1	3	0
2003	Long Island	14	0	0	1	1	49	1	2	0	0	1	1	4	0
2004	Long Island	9	0	0	0	0	24	4	--	--	--	--	--	--	--
2005	Long Island	12	0	0	2	2	44	2	2	0	0	0	0	10	0
2006	Long Island	10	0	0	2	2	34	0	--	--	--	--	--	--	--
MLL Totals		73	1	0	6	7	231	12.5	8	0	0	2	2	27	0

=== NLL ===
		Regular Season						Playoffs
Season	Team	GP	G	A	Pts	LB	PIM	GP	G	A	Pts	LB	PIM
1992	New York	6	3	4	7	31	0	1	0	0	0	5	2
1993	New York	7	1	6	7	28	2	2	0	0	0	9	0
1994	New York	7	1	0	1	25	15	1	0	0	0	3	2
1995	New York	8	1	2	3	32	9	--	--	--	--	--	--
1996	New York	10	3	5	8	29	10	--	--	--	--	--	--
1997	New York	10	1	5	6	46	12	1	0	0	0	9	0
1998	New York	12	3	8	11	59	20	--	--	--	--	--	--
1999	New York	12	3	6	9	86	4	--	--	--	--	--	--
2000	New York	12	4	11	15	72	8	--	--	--	--	--	--
2001	New York	14	1	5	6	85	12	--	--	--	--	--	--
2002	New York	16	2	9	11	142	18	--	--	--	--	--	--
MILL/NLL totals		114	23	61	84	635	110	5	0	0	0	26	4

=== NLL head coaching statistics ===
Team	Season	Regular Season				Playoffs				Playoff result
Team	Season	GC	W	L	W%	GC	W	L	W%	Playoff result
New York Saints	2003	16	3	13	.188	–	–	–	–	Did not qualify
Anaheim Storm	2004	16	1	15	.063	–	–	–	–	Did not qualify
Totals:	2	32	4	28	.125	–	–	–	–	

== Awards ==
Preceded by Dave Pietramala	William C. Schmeisser Award; 1990	Succeeded by Graham Harden
Preceded by Kevin Finneran	MLL Sportsman of the Year Award; 2005	Succeeded by Michael Culver

== See also ==
- Syracuse Orange men's lacrosse
