= Bill Tierney =

American lacrosse coach (born 1952)

Biographical details
- Born: September 26, 1952 (age 74)

Playing career
- 1970–1973: Cortland State

Coaching career (HC unless noted)
- 1982–1984: RIT
- 1985–1987: Johns Hopkins (assistant)
- 1988–2009: Princeton
- 2010–2023: Denver
- 2024–Current: Philadelphia Waterdogs

Head coaching record
- Overall: 439–152

Accomplishments and honors

Championships
- 2015 NCAA Division I Men's Lacrosse Championship; 2001 NCAA Division I Men's Lacrosse Championship; 1998 NCAA Division I Men's Lacrosse Championship; 1997 NCAA Division I Men's Lacrosse Championship; 1996 NCAA Division I Men's Lacrosse Championship; 1994 NCAA Division I Men's Lacrosse Championship; 1992 NCAA Division I Men's Lacrosse Championship

Awards
- As player: 1973 USILA Small College National Championship; As coach: 1992, 2015 F. Morris Touchstone Award; 2002 National Lacrosse Hall of Fame; Dick Edell Coach of the Year (2026)

William G. Tierney (born September 26, 1952) is an American lacrosse coach who is the head coach for the Philadelphia Waterdogs. Previously, he led the men's lacrosse team at the University of Denver. Tierney is the first college lacrosse coach to win an NCAA DI Championship west of the Eastern Time Zone. He coached seven NCAA DI championship teams, including six at Princeton University and one at the University of Denver. Tierney's teams have had a combined winning percentage of .743.

He is widely regarded as one of the greatest lacrosse coaches of all time.

Tierney joined the Philadelphia Waterdogs on March 28, 2024

== Player ==
A native of Levittown, New York, Tierney played collegiate lacrosse at Cortland State where he was also a member of the Delta Kappa Beta fraternity. In 1973, he played on the USILA national championship team. This was the small college, non Division I national tournament, prior to the splitting of Division I, II and III national tournaments.

In 1972, Tierney was a member of a seminal Cortland NCAA Semifinal team that upset Navy. Following college, Tierney pursued a master's degree at Adelphi University, and coached high school lacrosse at Great Neck South High School, then Levittown Memorial High School.

== Coach ==
In 1982, Tierney's took his first collegiate coaching position with the Rochester Institute of Technology. He took the team to its first NCAA tournaments in both 1983 and 1984. In 1983, he earned the Division III Coach of the Year. Following this success, Tierney joined the Johns Hopkins University Blue Jays as an assistant lacrosse coach (winning two national championships), and also served as head coach of the soccer team from 1985 to 1987.

In 1988, Tierney accepted the position as head coach of the Princeton Tigers. He acquired a program that was underdeveloped, and quickly turned it around. Tierney's Tigers won six NCAA championships (1992, 1994, 1996, 1997, 1998, and 2001) in nine years, and have appeared in eight NCAA championship games, nine NCAA Final Fours and 11 Ivy League championships. In 1992, Tierney was awarded USILA Coach of the Year honors.

Internationally, Tierney coached Team USA to a Gold Medal with a 15-14 OT win over Canada in the 1998 World Lacrosse Championships

In 2002, Tierney was inducted into the National Lacrosse Hall of Fame with the distinction of being "a truly great coach."

In 1998 and 2001, Tierney and his sons Trevor (a goaltender) and Brendan (midfield/attack), became the first father-sons combination to win an NCAA Men's Lacrosse Championship together. His daughter Brianne Tierney, a former player at Loyola of Maryland and Colgate, is currently the women's head coach at Kent State, which will begin varsity play in the 2019 season; her husband Dylan Sheridan is the assistant coach at Ohio State and was the men's head coach at Cleveland State.

Tierney began coaching the men's lacrosse team at the University of Denver on July 1, 2009. IFS Coach Tierney called the change a "wonderful opportunity to start this new chapter in my life."

On May 25, 2015, Tierney led Denver to the team's first national championship. They beat Maryland by a score of 10-5. Denver was the 10th different school to raise the trophy and the first team west of the Appalachian Mountains.

Tierney joined the Waterdogs on March 28, 2024 as their head coach

== Head coaching record ==
University of Denver

Season	Wins	Losses	Win Pct.	Postseason
2023	10	5	.667	—
2022	9	6	.600	—
2021	12	5	.706	Lost in 1st round of NCAA Division I tournament
2020	4	2	.667	Cancelled due to the Coronovirus Pandemic
2019	10	5	.667	—
2018	13	4	.765	Lost in quarterfinal of NCAA Division I tournament
2017	13	4	.765	Lost in semifinal of NCAA Division I tournament
2016	13	3	.813	Lost in 1st round of NCAA Division I tournament
2015	17	2	.895	Won NCAA Division I Championship
2014	16	3	.842	Lost in semifinal of NCAA Division I tournament
2013	14	5	.737	Lost in semifinal of NCAA Division I tournament
2012	9	7	.562	Lost in quarterfinals of NCAA Division I tournament
2011	15	3	.833	Lost in semifinal of NCAA Division I tournament
2010	12	5	.706	Lost in 1st round of NCAA Division I tournament

Princeton University

Season	Wins	Losses	Win Pct.	Postseason
2009	13	3	.812	Lost in quarterfinals of NCAA Division I tournament
2008	7	6	.538	—
2007	10	4	.714	Lost in 1st round of NCAA Division I tournament
2006	11	5	.688	Lost in quarterfinals of NCAA Division I tournament
2005	5	7	.417	—
2004	11	4	.733	Lost in semifinals of NCAA Division I tournament
2003	11	4	.733	Lost in quarterfinals of NCAA Division I tournament
2002	10	5	.667	Lost in finals of NCAA Division I tournament
2001	14	1	.933	Won NCAA Division I Championship
2000	12	3	.800	Lost in finals of NCAA Division I tournament
1999	9	4	.692	Lost in 1st round of NCAA Division III tournament
1998	14	1	.933	Won NCAA Division I Championship
1997	15	0	1.000	Won NCAA Division I Championship
1996	14	1	.933	Won NCAA Division I Championship
1995	11	4	.733	Lost in quarterfinals of NCAA Division I tournament
1994	14	1	.933	Won NCAA Division I Championship
1993	13	2	.832	Lost in quarterfinals of NCAA Division I tournament
1992	13	2	.867	Won NCAA Division I Championship
1991	11	3	.786	Lost in 1st round of NCAA Division I tournament
1990	11	4	.688	Lost in quarterfinals of NCAA Division I tournament
1989	3	11	.214	—
1988	2	10	.167	—

Rochester Institute

Season	Wins	Losses	Win Pct.	Postseason
1984	11	3	.786	Lost in Semifinals of NCAA Division III tournament
1983	11	3	.786	Lost in 1st round of NCAA Division III tournament
1982	10	2	.833	—
