= John Glatzel =

American lacrosse player

- Born: May 27, 1979 (age 45); Baltimore, Maryland
- Nationality: American
- Height: 6 ft 0 in (1.83 m)
- Weight: 210 pounds (95 kg)
- Position: Defense
- NLL draft: 32nd overall, 2002; Rochester Knighthawks
- MLL teams: Rochester Rattlers; Boston Cannons; New Jersey Pride
- NCAA team: Syracuse University
- Pro career: 2002–2008
- Nickname: JG

John Glatzel (born May 27, 1979 in Baltimore, Maryland) is a professional lacrosse player with the New Jersey Pride of Major League Lacrosse.

John Glatzel lived in Ellicott City, Maryland, and graduated from the Boys' Latin School of Maryland in Baltimore. Glatzel attended Syracuse University, where he was a two-time captain and three-time All-American (1st team in '01, '02; 2nd team in '00). In 2000 and 2002, Glatzel helped lead the Orangemen to the NCAA Men's Lacrosse Championship. Also in 2002, he was awarded the William C. Schmeisser Award, given to the nation's most outstanding NCAA lacrosse defenseman.

Glatzel played for the 2002 Gold-medal winning US national team.

Glatzel was drafted in the 1st round (5th overall) of the 2002 Major League Lacrosse draft by the Rochester Rattlers. Glatzel played in three Major League Lacrosse All-Star Games (2003, 2004, and 2005) as a Rattler. Prior to the 2006 season he was acquired by the Boston Cannons. He was then picked up by the New Jersey Pride in the 2008 Supplemental Draft (3rd overall). He played two games for New Jersey before being waived.

== Awards ==
- William C. Schmeisser Award, 2002
- Greater Baltimore Chapter Lacrosse Hall of Fame, inducted 2014

Preceded by Ryan Mollett	William C. Schmeisser Award; 2002	Succeeded by Michael Howley
