= St. Paul's School for Boys =

School in Brooklandville, Maryland, US

Coordinates: 39°25′52.1″N 76°40′35″W

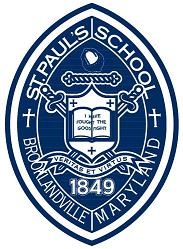

Location
- 11152 Falls Rd; Brooklandville, Baltimore County, Maryland; United States

Information
- Type: Private, Day
- Motto: "Veritas et Virtus" (Truth and Virtue)
- Religious affiliation: Episcopal
- Established: February 1849; 177 years ago
- Sister school: St. Paul's School for Girls (reestablished 1959); St. Paul's Pre and Lower School (coed, six week through grade 4)
- NCES School ID: 00579506
- Headmaster: Edward M. Trusty, Jr.
- Faculty: 108.6 (FTE)
- Grades: 5–12
- Gender: Coed
- Enrollment: 530 (2023)
- Student to teacher ratio: 7:1
- Campus: Large suburban, (since 1952); 64 acres (260,000 m^{2})
- Colors: Blue and Gold
- Athletics conference: Maryland Interscholastic Athletic Association (MIAA)
- Mascot: "The Crusader"
- Teams: "The Crusaders" (athletic)
- Rival: Boys' Latin School of Maryland
- Newspaper: The Monitor
- Website: www.stpaulsmd.org/boys

St. Paul's School for Boys is an Episcopal, coed, private school located in Brooklandville, Maryland. It occupies a 120-acre (0.49 km^{2}) rural campus in the Green Spring Valley Historic District, ten miles (16 km) north of the city of Baltimore in suburban Baltimore County.

The school includes a pre-school and a lower school, which are coed through grade 4. The boys school also shares its campus with St. Paul's School for Girls which was reestablished in 1959 after a 19th-century predecessor failed. In July 2018, the schools unified under the umbrella of The St. Paul's Schools, with a single board of trustees and one president; each school retains its individual traditions and its gender-specific programs.

St. Paul's School for Boys was founded in February 1849 at Old St. Paul's Parish in Baltimore City by the Reverend William Edward Wyatt, rector.

St. Paul's moved its campus four times until its final location at the current grounds in 1952. The principal building on the Brooklandville campus is "Brooklandwood," a mansion built in 1793 by Charles Carroll of Carrollton (1737–1832), one of the signers of the Declaration of Independence. The building was listed on the National Register of Historic Places in 1972.

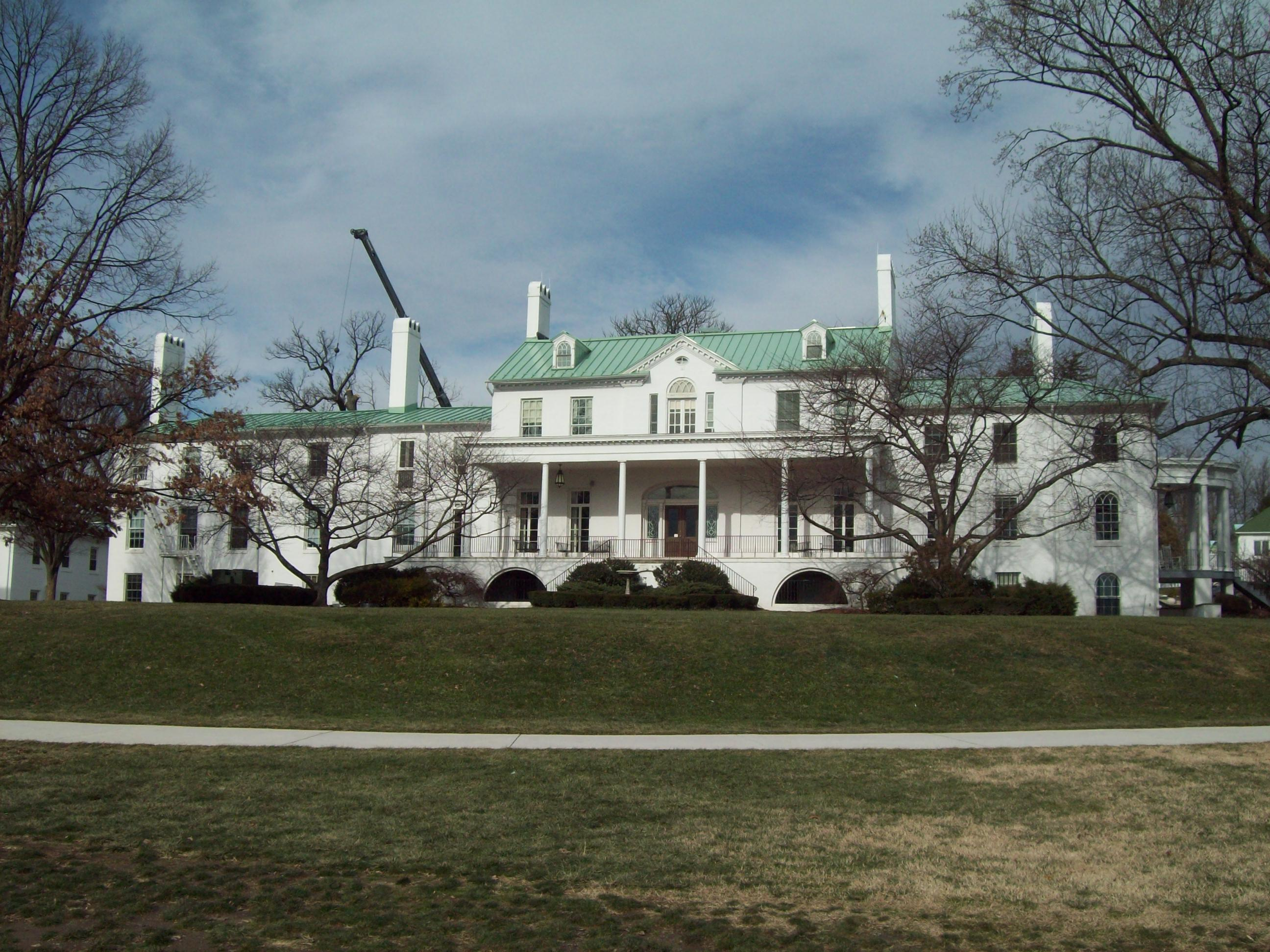
Brooklandwood mansion

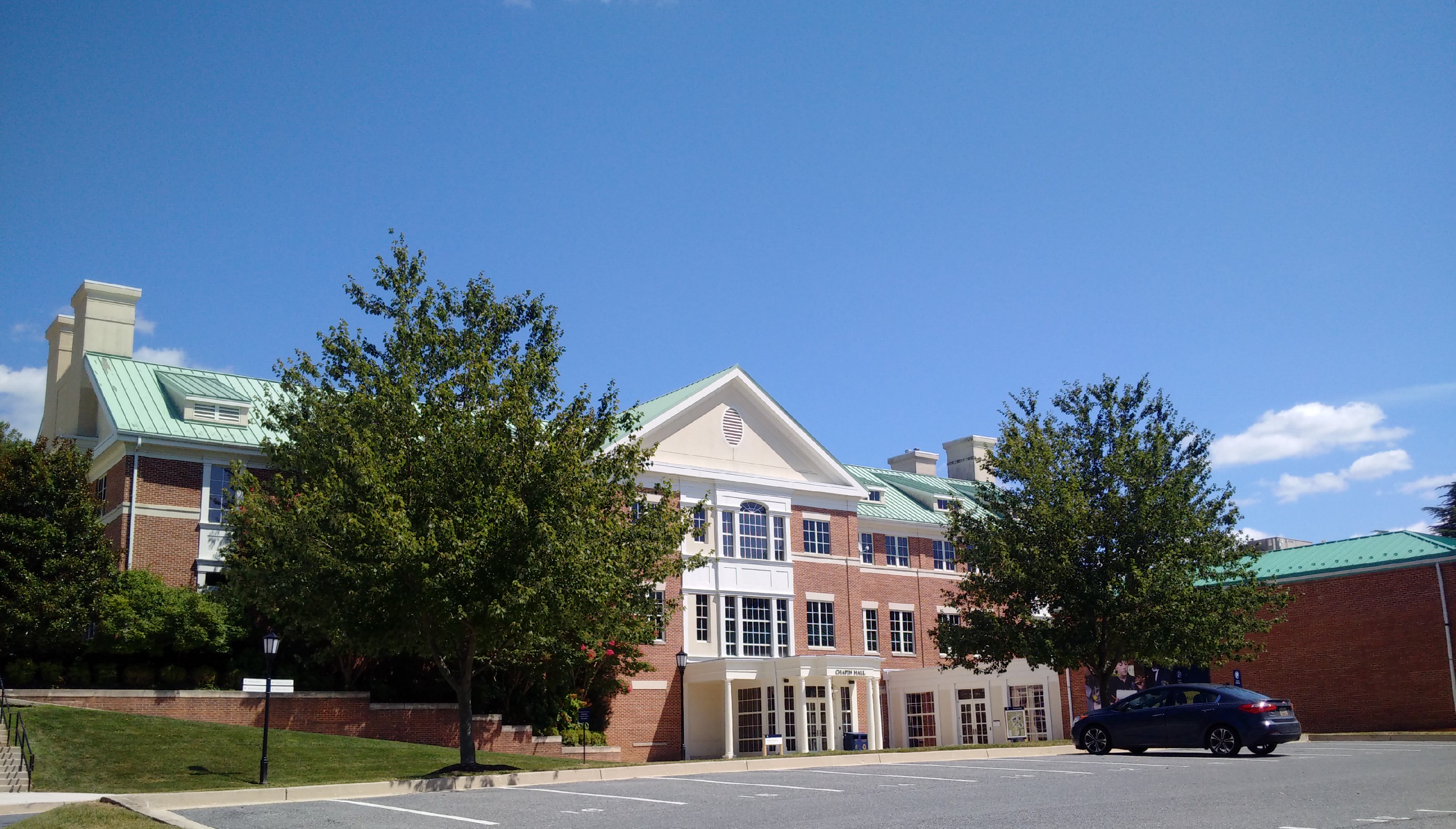
Chapin Hall for middle-school boys

== Academics ==
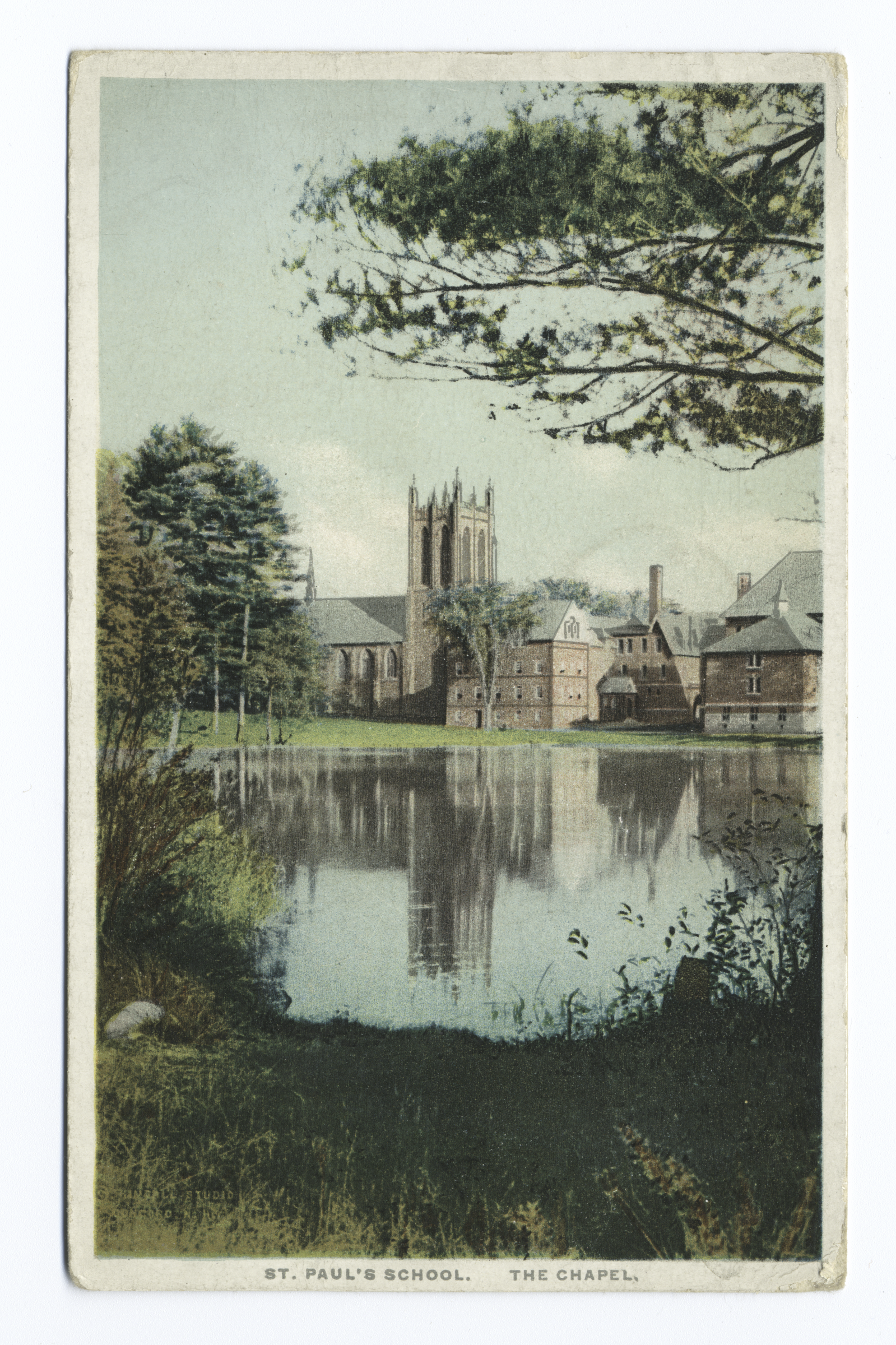
The Chapel in 1898

At the time of the school's founding in the mid-nineteenth century, boys studied Greek, Latin, and math. Church music was also given a high priority. Today St. Paul's School for Boys offers a college-preparatory curriculum for students in the Upper School (grades 9–12). The school offers the IB Diploma Program. It also offers courses in theater, concert chorale, digital arts, and visual arts.

== Athletics ==
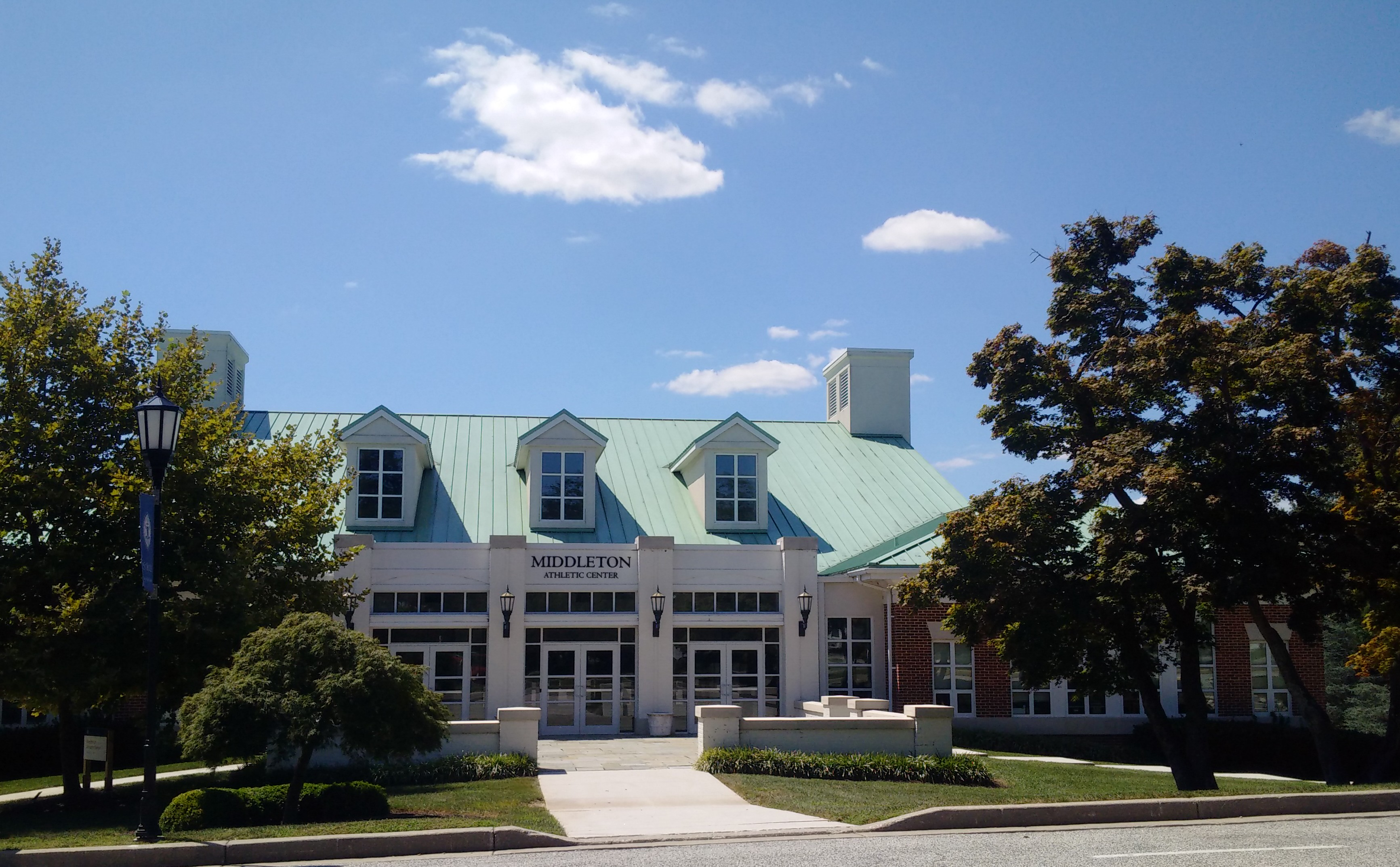
Middleton Athletic Center, St. Paul's

St. Paul's places a strong emphasis on athletics. Despite the school's small class sizes of roughly 70 students per class year, the school supports varsity teams in lacrosse, football, soccer, volleyball, cross-country, wrestling, basketball, ice hockey, squash, tennis, crew, golf, baseball.

=== Baseball ===
Future Major League baseball player Spencer Horwitz attended the school. Playing baseball for the school, primarily at catcher, Horwitz was a 2016 Maryland Interscholastic Athletic Association (MIAA) First Team selection, and twice MIAA All-Conference.

=== Hockey ===
Spencer Horwitz played as a defenseman in hockey, and led the high school to two state championships.

=== Lacrosse ===
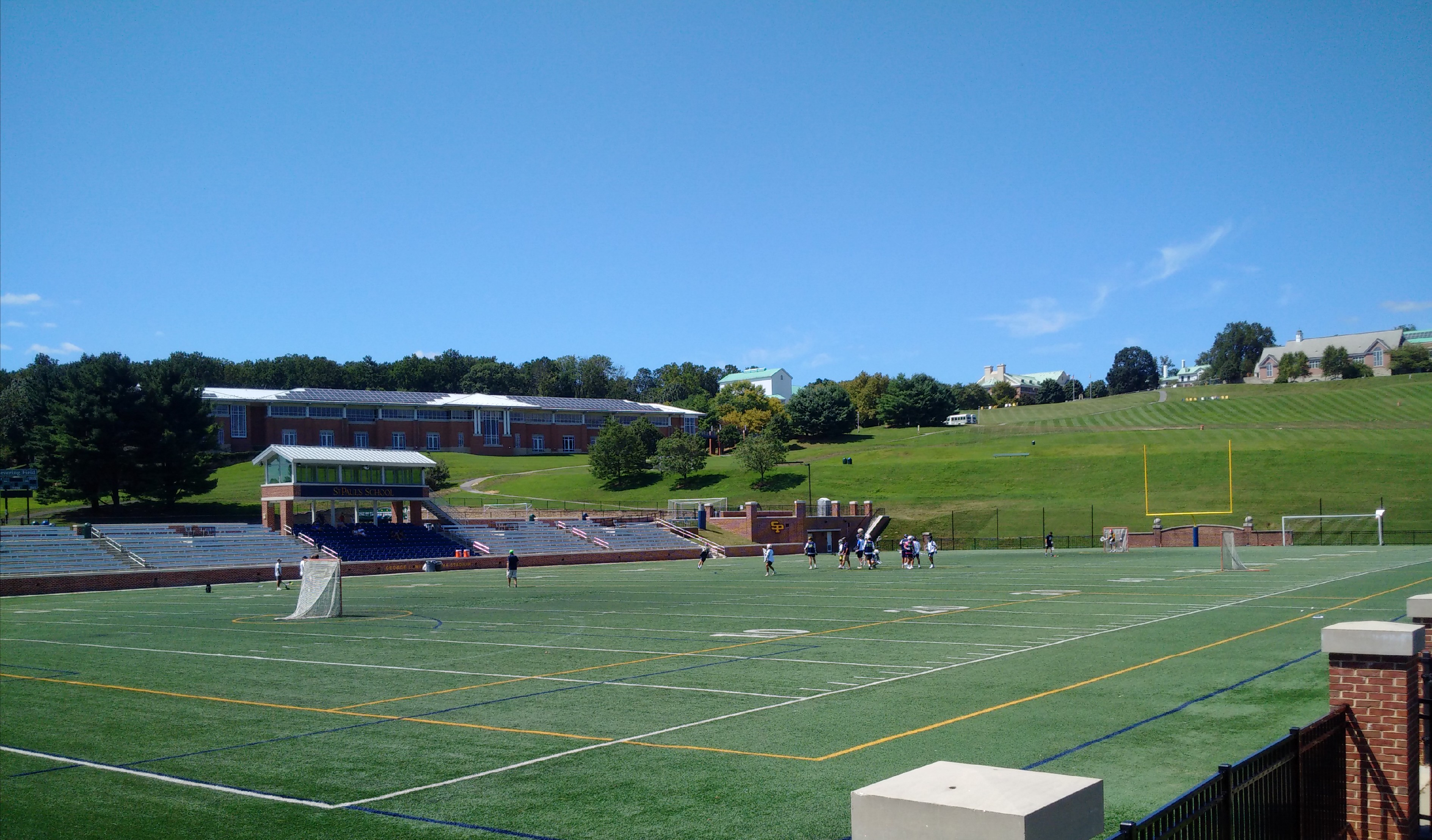
St. Paul's School athletics field

Since the start of varsity lacrosse interscholastic competition at St. Paul's in 1933, the Crusaders have won 25 titles in the old Maryland Scholastic Association (MSA) followed by the MIAA — more than any other team in the conference. St. Paul's claimed its first lacrosse title in the MSA public/private schools league in 1940 under Lacrosse Hall of Fame head coach Howdy Myers. St. Paul's prevailed the next two decades in the MSA, winning the title 14 times.

In 1947, St. Paul's beat Princeton University twice. During this period, St. Paul's posted five undefeated seasons, four under Myers and another in 1951 under Jim Adams. The 1969 Crusader team, coached by George Mitchell, went undefeated. The 1992 St. Paul's team also went undefeated, winning a MSA championship under coach Mitch Whiteley. In 2010, St. Paul's won the conference championship, the 25th in school history, under head coach Rick Brocato. St. Paul's has produced 12 C. Markland Kelly Award winners, which honors the top scholastic player in the state of Maryland each year. St. Paul's has also produced 22 high school All-Americans and 21 graduates in the U.S. Lacrosse Hall of Fame.

=== Basketball ===
The inaugural season for Varsity Basketball was 1935 and the program has won 16 championships with 13 coaches. Championships include the MSA "B" Conference, Baltimore Interacademic League, (IAC), MSA “C”, MSA “A” Conference, and the MIAA B Conference.The most recent championship was in 2016–17. Coach Howdy Myers’ team won the first championship in 1938–39 in the MSA B conference.

=== Football ===
Since varsity football began early at St.Paul's in 1936, the Crusaders have won 20 championships. Mitch Tullai, former varsity football coach, coached at St. Paul's from 1953 to 1993. Over 40 years, Tullai won 11 Championships, including 6 MSA C-Conference Championships, and 5 Tri-County Championships.

=== Golf ===
The Varsity Golf team at St. Paul's School currently holds 16 MIAA or MSA championship titles, 8 stroke-play championship titles, 8 individual champions, and 11 All Metro Players. The team's home course is the West Course at Baltimore Country Club. The head coach is Eric Nordstrom.

== Traditions ==
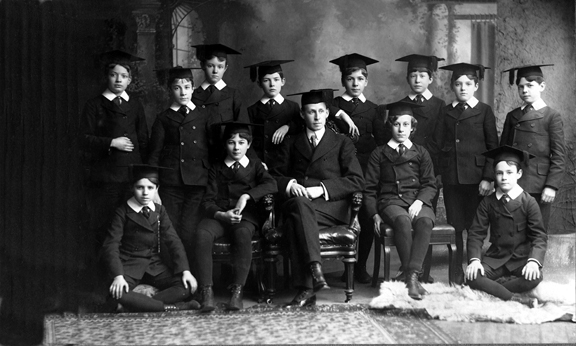
Boys’ School of St. Paul's Parish

Since 1935, the St. Paul's Honor Council has been run by a group of upperclassmen who are elected by the student body. The council upholds the school's honor code and the principles of the school motto, Veritas et Virtus, truth and virtue. The first alumni association was founded in 1894. Each year, the alumni association plays host to a number of events that bring alums back to campus.

== Notable alumni ==
- James 'Ace' Adams – lacrosse Hall of Fame inductee and coach; namesake includes Adams Field at UPenn
- Scott Bacigalupo – lacrosse player
- A. Aubrey Bodine – photographer
- Conor Gill – professional lacrosse player
- Spencer Horwitz – MLB first baseman for the Pittsburgh Pirates
- Steve Johnson – MLB pitcher for the Seattle Mariners
- Johnny Mann – Grammy Award-winning composer, conductor, entertainer, and recording artist
- Mark Pellington – director of Arlington Road and music video for the Pearl Jam song "Jeremy"
- Richard Sher – newscaster, WJZ-TV Baltimore
- Cam Spencer – National Champion with the UCONN HUSKIES & NBA player
- Pat Spencer – professional basketball player and 2019 Tewaaraton Award winner
- LaMonte Wade – MLB first baseman for the Houston Astros
- Mark Walsh – entrepreneur, venture capitalist, political activist
- Michael Watson – professional lacrosse player
- Don Zimmerman – college lacrosse coach
