= Michael Watson (lacrosse) =

American lacrosse player

Personal information
- Nationality: American
- Born: October 24, 1974 (age 51)
- Height: 5 ft 9 in (175 cm)
- Weight: 175 lb (79 kg; 12 st 7 lb)

Sport
- Position: Attack
- Shoots: Right
- NLL draft: 9th overall, 1997; Baltimore Thunder
- MLL teams: Los Angeles Riptide; Boston Cannons
- NCAA team: University of Virginia
- Pro career: 2001–

Michael Watson (born October 24, 1974) is an American lacrosse player who starred in college at the University of Virginia before moving on to play professional lacrosse in Major League Lacrosse.

He is a Baltimore native.

== High school and collegiate career ==
Michael Watson attended prep school at St. Paul's School in Brooklandville, Maryland, where he was a high school All-American. He played NCAA Division I lacrosse at the University of Virginia from 1994 and 1997. As a prolific attackman, Watson garnered numerous awards and helped lead the Virginia Cavaliers to two NCAA national championship appearances, one in 1994 and one in 1996. In both title games, however, Princeton defeated Virginia by one goal in overtime. Watson was a four-time All-American attackman, having been named to the Third Team in 1994, Second Team in 1995, and First Team in 1996 and 1997. In addition, he was named by the USILA as Attackman of the Year for Division I in 1996 (Lt. Col. Jack Turnbull Award). Watson was also named All-ACC four times, picked as the Most Valuable Player of the 1996 NCAA Tournament, named the 1994 ACC Rookie of the Year, was selected to play in 1997 North-South Senior All-Star Game, and was named one of the 50 greatest lacrosse players in ACC history in 2002. Watson ranks second for most career goals at Virginia with 142 goals in 62 games, behind teammate Doug Knight's 165 goals in 60 games. The Virginia attack unit consisting of Watson, Doug Knight, and Tim Whiteley is regarded as among the best of all time, leading the nation in offensive output and setting several ACC records. Watson was also selected for the 1998 U.S. National Team and scored 12 goals and 8 assists for 20 total points in the 1998 World Lacrosse Championship held in Baltimore, Maryland.

Watson and Virginia teammate Doug Knight are credited with popularizing "the dive" or "the dive shot," an acrobatic move where an offensive player attacks the goal from behind the net by diving airborne through the goal crease while shooting the ball at the goal while in mid-air. The NCAA subsequently banned this practice in 1998 due to safety concerns and difficulty in officiating the play.

== Professional career ==
Watson played professional outdoor lacrosse for the Major League Lacrosse team the Boston Cannons from 2001 to 2004. In 2002, he played in all 14 regular season games and led the team in assists and picked up 28 groundballs. In 2003, he scored 31 points and was selected to the MLL All-Star Team. In 2004, Watson scored 39 goals with eight assists for 47 total points, including a six-goal game against the Rochester Rattlers. He scored 20 goals in four games, which is the best four-game stretch in MLL history. The Cannons selected Watson as Offensive Player of the Year. In addition, Inside Lacrosse magazine named him "The MLL's Most Electrifying Player" in 2004.

Following a year off from the sport, Watson returned to the MLL in 2006 as the first overall draft pick by the Los Angeles Riptide. He played in 12 games and notched 40 points and one game-winning goal. In 2007, he appeared in all 12 Riptide games and led the team in goals with 31, and was second on the team in points with 40. He scored two game-winning goals and picked up 24 groundballs. He also scored five goals in a game three times and was named to the 2007 MLL Western Conference All-Star team. In 2008, Watson scored 10 goals and 11 assists and scooped up 15 groundballs. The Los Angeles Riptide ceased operations before the 2009 season due to the economic downturn in the United States.

Watson is the model for the Major League Lacrosse logo.

Watson was inducted into the National Lacrosse Hall of Fame as a member of the class of 2013.

== Statistics ==
=== University of Virginia ===
Season	GP	G	A	Pts	PPG
1994	17	31	19	50	--
1995	15	30	23	53	--
1996	16	49	26	75	--
1997	14	32	30	62	--
Totals	62	142	98	240	--
