= Schmeisser Award =

The William C. Schmeisser Award is an award given annually to the NCAA's most outstanding defenseman in men's college lacrosse. First presented in 1942, it is one of the oldest individual awards in collegiate lacrosse. The award is presented by the USILA and is named after William C. "Father Bill" Schmeisser, a player and coach for Johns Hopkins University in the early 1900s. Schmeisser played defense at Hopkins from 1900 to 1902. He was head coach of the Blue Jays from 1907 to 1911 and continued to serve as an advisory coach to the team thereafter, accompanying the team to the 1928 Olympics in Amsterdam. He was a charter founder of the Mt. Washington Lacrosse Club and was inducted into the U.S. Lacrosse Hall of Fame in 1957. In its early years, the physical trophy was a rotating award retained by the winning college rather than the individual winner; recipients instead received framed certificates known as Shingles.

== Award Winners by Year ==
Year	Player	School
1942	Tyler Campbell	Princeton
1943	George Riepe	Johns Hopkins
1944	Fred Allner Jr.	Cornell
1945	Charles Guy	Navy
1946	Robert Fetters	Maryland
1947	Fred Allner Jr.	Princeton
1948	John McEnery	Army
1949	Lloyd Bunting	Johns Hopkins
1950	Kin Yellott	Yale
1951	Joe Sollers	Johns Hopkins
1952	Bill Hubbell	Maryland
1953	Jack Johnson	Army
1954	Stan Swanson	Navy
1955	John Raster	Navy
1956	John Simmons	Maryland
1957	Ben Glyphis	Army
1958	Walt Mitchell	Johns Hopkins
1959	Don Tillar	Army
1960	Bill Carpenter	Army
1961	Mike Byrne	Johns Hopkins
1962	Bob Fuelhart	Army
1963	Mike Coughlin	Navy
1964	Jim Campbell	Navy
1965	Pat Donnelly	Navy
1966	Hank Kaestner	Johns Hopkins
1967	Hank Kaestner	Johns Hopkins
1968	Carl Tamulevich	Navy
1969	Mike Clark	Johns Hopkins
1970	Greg Murphy	Navy
1971	John Burnap	Cornell
1972	Tom O’Leary	Army
1973	Mike Thearle	Maryland
1974	Boo Smith	Virginia
1975	John Lawlor	Navy
1976	Mike Farrell	Maryland
1977	Chris Kane	Cornell
1978	Chris Kane	Cornell
1979	Mark Greenberg	Johns Hopkins
1980	Mark Greenberg	Johns Hopkins
1981	Bob Henry	Army
1982	George McGeeney	UMBC
1983	Steve Byrne	Virginia
1984	Tom Haus	North Carolina
1985	John DeTommaso	Johns Hopkins
1986	Tom Haus	North Carolina
1987	Tom Haus	North Carolina
1988	Dave Pietramala	Johns Hopkins
1989	Dave Pietramala	Johns Hopkins
1990	Pat McCabe	Syracuse
1991	Graham Harden	North Carolina
1992	Brian Burlace	Maryland
1992	David Morrow	Princeton
1993	David Morrow	Princeton
1994	Reid Jackson	Rutgers
1995	Dan Radebaugh	Maryland
1996	Tyler Hardy	Duke
1997	Brian Kuczma	Johns Hopkins
1998	Christian Cook	Princeton
1999	Ryan Curtis	Virginia
2000	Marshall Abrams	Syracuse
2001	Ryan Mollett	Princeton
2002	John Glatzel	Syracuse
2003	Michael Howley	Maryland
2004	Lee Zink	Maryland
2005	Brodie Merrill	Georgetown
2006	Michael Culver	Virginia
2007	Mitchell Belisle	Cornell
2008	Nick O’Hara	Duke
2009	Michael Evans	Johns Hopkins
2010	Ken Clausen; Ryan Flanagan	Virginia; North Carolina
2011	John Lade	Syracuse
2012	Tucker Durkin	Johns Hopkins
2013	Tucker Durkin	Johns Hopkins
2014	Joe Fletcher	Loyola
2015	Matt Landis	Notre Dame
2016	Matt Landis	Notre Dame
2017	Tim Muller	Maryland
2018	John Sexton	Notre Dame
2019	Johnny Surdick	Army
2020	None	(Season canceled due to COVID-19 Pandemic)
2021	JT Giles-Harris	Duke
2022	Will Bowen	Georgetown
2023	Gavin Adler	Cornell
2024	Jake Piseno	Albany
2025	Shawn Lyght; Bobby Van Buren	Notre Dame; Ohio State
2026	Shawn Lyght	Notre Dame

== Number of Awards by University ==
Rank	School	Awards
1	Johns Hopkins University	17
2	University of Maryland	10
3	United States Naval Academy	9
3	United States Military Academy	9
5	Princeton University	6
5	Cornell University	6
7	University of North Carolina	5
7	University of Virginia	5
7	University of Notre Dame	5
10	Syracuse University	4
10	Duke University	4
12	Georgetown University	2
13	Loyola University Maryland	1
13	Yale University	1
13	University of Maryland, Baltimore County	1
13	Rutgers University	1
13	University at Albany	1
13	Ohio State	1

== See also ==
- Jack Turnbull Award
- Lt. Raymond Enners Award
- McLaughlin Award
- Major League Lacrosse Defensive Player of the Year Award
- National Lacrosse League Defensive Player of the Year Award
