= 1997 NCAA Division I men's lacrosse tournament =

- Teams: 12
- Finals site: Byrd Stadium, College Park, Maryland
- Champions: Princeton (4th title)
- Runner-up: Maryland (8th title game)
- Semifinalists: Duke (1st Final Four); Syracuse (15th Final Four)
- Winning coach: Bill Tierney (4th title)
- MOP: Jon Hess, Princeton
- Attendance: 25,317 finals 77,170 total
- Top scorer: Andrew Whipple, Maryland (17 goals)

The 1997 NCAA Division I lacrosse tournament was the 27th annual tournament hosted by the National Collegiate Athletic Association to determine the team champion of men's college lacrosse among its Division I programs, held at the end of the 1997 NCAA Division I men's lacrosse season.

Princeton defeated Maryland in the final, 19–7. This was Princeton's second consecutive national championship under Head Coach Bill Tierney and their fourth title since 1992. This championship was part of the 29 straight games of Princeton over three seasons.

The championship game was played at Byrd Stadium at the University of Maryland in College Park, Maryland, with 25,317 fans in attendance.

== Qualifying ==
Twelve NCAA Division I college men's lacrosse teams met after having played their way through a regular season, and for some, a conference tournament.

Georgetown made their debut appearance in the Division I lacrosse tournament.

== Bracket ==
First Round
8	Massachusetts	6
Hofstra	4
5	Duke	11
Brown	6
6	Loyola Maryland	21
Notre Dame	5
Maryland	14
7	Georgetown	10

Quarterfinals
1	Princeton	11
8	Massachusetts	9
4	Johns Hopkins	11
5	Duke	12*
3	Syracuse	13
6	Loyola Maryland	12
2	Virginia	9
Maryland	10

Semifinals
1	Princeton	10
5	Duke	9
3	Syracuse	17
Maryland	18

Final
1	Princeton	19
Maryland	7

- * = Overtime

== All-Tournament Team ==
- Jon Hess, Princeton (Named the tournament's Most Outstanding Player)
- Jesse Hubbard, Princeton
- Chris Massey, Princeton
- Becket Wolf, Princeton
- Pat Cairns, Princeton
- Matt Hahn, Maryland
- Andrew Whipple, Maryland
- Casey Powell, Syracuse
- John Fay, Duke
- Rob Kavovit, Syracuse

== See also ==
- 1997 NCAA Division I women's lacrosse tournament
- 1997 NCAA Division II lacrosse tournament
- 1997 NCAA Division III men's lacrosse tournament
