= 1996 NCAA Division I men's lacrosse tournament =

- Teams: 12
- Finals site: Byrd Stadium; College Park, Maryland
- Champions: Princeton (3rd title)
- Runner-up: Virginia (5th title game)
- Semifinalists: Johns Hopkins (20th Final Four); Syracuse (14th Final Four)
- Winning coach: Bill Tierney (3rd title)
- MOP: Michael Watson, Virginia
- Attendance: 22,102 finals 68,978 total
- Top scorers: Rob Kavovit, Syracuse; Doug Knight and Tim Whiteley, Virginia (16 goals)

The 1996 NCAA Division I lacrosse tournament was the 26th annual tournament hosted by the National Collegiate Athletic Association to determine the team champion of men's college lacrosse among its Division I programs, held at the end of the 1996 NCAA Division I men's lacrosse season.

Princeton defeated Virginia in the final, 13–12 in overtime. Jesse Hubbard scored the game-winning goal for Princeton in overtime. This was Princeton's third national championship under Head Coach Bill Tierney.

The championship game was played at Byrd Stadium at the University of Maryland in College Park, Maryland, with 22,102 fans in attendance.

== Qualifying ==
Twelve NCAA Division I college men's lacrosse teams met after having played their way through a regular season, and for some, a conference tournament. No teams made their debut appearance in the Division I lacrosse tournament in 1996.

== Tournament bracket ==
First Round
8	Towson State	16
Loyola Maryland	11
5	Syracuse	12
Army	3
Harvard	15
6	Hofstra	12
7	Johns Hopkins	12
Notre Dame	7

Quarterfinals
1	Princeton	22
8	Towson State	6
4	North Carolina	12
5	Syracuse	19
3	Virginia	23
Harvard	12
2	Maryland	7
7	Johns Hopkins	9

Semifinals
1	Princeton	11
5	Syracuse	9
3	Virginia	16
7	Johns Hopkins	10

Final
1	Princeton	13 *
3	Virginia	12

- * = Overtime

== All-Tournament Team ==
- Michael Watson, Virginia (Named the tournament's Most Outstanding Player)
- Jesse Hubbard, Princeton
- David Curry, Virginia
- Casey Powell, Syracuse
- Becket Wolf, Princeton
- Tim Whiteley, Virginia
- Don McDonough, Princeton
- Tommy Smith, Virginia
- Pancho Gutstein, Princeton
- Chris Massey, Princeton

== See also ==
- 1996 NCAA Division I women's lacrosse tournament
- 1996 NCAA Division II lacrosse tournament
- 1996 NCAA Division III men's lacrosse tournament
