= 1998 NCAA Division I men's lacrosse tournament =

- Dates: May 9–25, 1998
- Teams: 12
- Finals site: Rutgers Stadium, Piscataway, New Jersey
- Champions: Princeton (5th title)
- Runner-up: Maryland (9th title game)
- Semifinalists: Loyola Maryland (2nd Final Four); Syracuse (16th Final Four)
- Winning coach: Bill Tierney (5th title)
- MOP: Corey Popham, Princeton
- Attendance: 17,225 finals 64,850 total
- Top scorer: Andrew Whipple, Maryland (18 goals)

The 1998 NCAA Division I lacrosse tournament was the 28th annual tournament hosted by the National Collegiate Athletic Association to determine the team champion of men's college lacrosse among its Division I programs, held at the end of the 1998 NCAA Division I men's lacrosse season.

Princeton defeated Maryland in the final, 15–5. This was Princeton's third consecutive national championship under Head Coach Bill Tierney, and their fifth title since 1992.

The championship game was played at Rutgers Stadium at Rutgers University in Piscataway, New Jersey, with 21,194 fans in attendance.

== Qualifying ==
Twelve NCAA Division I college men's lacrosse teams met after having played their way through a regular season, and for some, a conference tournament.

Butler, Hobart, and UMBC made their debut appearances in the Division I lacrosse tournament.

== Bracket ==
First Round; May 9-10, 1998
Georgetown	9
8	UMBC	8
5	Maryland	18
Butler	10
7	Duke	16
North Carolina	14
6	Virginia	16
Hobart	10

Quarterfinals; May 16-17, 1998
1	Loyola Maryland	12
Georgetown	11
4	Johns Hopkins	10
5	Maryland	11*
2	Princeton	11
7	Duke	9
3	Syracuse	17
6	Virginia	14

Semifinals; May 23, 1998
1	Loyola Maryland	8
5	Maryland	19
2	Princeton	11
3	Syracuse	10

Final; May 25, 1998
5	Maryland	5
2	Princeton	15

- * = Overtime

== All-Tournament Team ==
- Corey Popham, Princeton (Named the tournament's Most Outstanding Player)
- Christian Cook, Princeton
- Jesse Hubbard, Princeton
- Jon Hess, Princeton
- Josh Sims, Princeton
- Scott Hochstadt, Maryland
- Mike Bonnani, Maryland
- Brian Haggerty, Maryland
- Casey Powell, Syracuse
- Ryan Powell, Syracuse
- Luke Parrott
- Brian Woody

== See also ==
- 1998 NCAA Division I women's lacrosse tournament
- 1998 NCAA Division II lacrosse tournament
- 1998 NCAA Division III men's lacrosse tournament
