= Alex Hewit =

Lacrosse player

Personal information
- Nationality: American
- Born: November 8, 1985 (age 40)
- Height: 5 ft 10 in (178 cm)
- Weight: 200 lb (91 kg; 14 st 4 lb)

Sport
- Position: Goaltender
- NCAA team: Princeton University (2008)

Career highlights
- College highlights: Ensign C. Markland Kelly, Jr. Award (2006); All-American 3x (1st team: 2006; 2nd team: 2007; honorable mention: 2008)

Alexander G. Hewit (born November 8, 1985) is a retired lacrosse goaltender. He led his high school to three New Jersey state championships and was one of the most sought after high school lacrosse players in the United States. He starred as a member of the Princeton Tigers men's lacrosse team from 2005 through 2008. He was recognized as a three-time United States Intercollegiate Lacrosse Association (USILA) All-American (first team once) and a three-time second team All-Ivy League performer. He was the 2006 National Collegiate Athletic Association (NCAA) goaltender of the year and 2008 Princeton co-captain. During his college career, Princeton lacrosse earned an Ivy League championship and two NCAA Division I Men's Lacrosse Championship invitations.

== Background ==
Hewit is the son of Russell and Nan Hewit, and his siblings are Grant, Meghan and Rusty. Born November 8, 1985, and raised in Chatham, New Jersey, Hewit began playing lacrosse as a youth. Both of his older brothers played and introduced him to the sport. Hewit started playing lacrosse in fourth grade in a local recreational league in his hometown. By sixth grade he was converted from an attackman to a goalie, but not until the coaches convinced his mother's that her concern for her son's safety were unwarranted. He met his middle school, high school and college teammate Dan Cocoziello taking an entrance exam for the Delbarton School in sixth grade. On the seventh and eighth grade team and the freshman team at the Delbarton School he also played goalie. In eighth grade, he made a New Jersey state eighth-grade all-star team along with Cocoziello that competed against all-stars from other states. He made the varsity team as a sophomore and helped lead the team to a cumulative 63–4 record and three high school lacrosse state championships. He was an all-state and all-conference goalie who made the headmaster's list as a student. According to Inside Lacrosse, he was the fifth-best high school lacrosse recruit in the nation in 2003. Since his older brother Grant was at Princeton, the college was on his short list along with Johns Hopkins, Duke, Harvard and Dartmouth. Grant later became captain of the 2006 Tigers lacrosse team.

== College career ==
Hewit played in six games for Princeton and started three as a freshman in 2005. He became the starting goalie late in his freshman year. He was first team USILA All-American Team selection in 2006, a second team selection in 2007 and an honorable mention selection in 2008. He was a 2006, 2007 & 2008 second team All-Ivy League selection. Hewit was a mild-mannered goalie who never celebrated after making saves. His goaltending style of taking away the high and tight shots altered the way opposing teams approached scoring. During the 2006 season, he held the three highest scoring teams in the country (Virginia, Hofstra and Cornell) to 20 goals, which was half of their combined average. He was given the Ensign C. Markland Kelly, Jr. Award in 2006 in recognition of being the best National Collegiate Athletic Association lacrosse goaltender. The 2006 team was Ivy League co-champion with Cornell. In 2007, he entered the season with a lower goals against average (6.45) than the NCAA Division I career record and was a preseason first team All-American according to Inside Lacrosse. He served as co-captain of the 2008 team. After a 5–7 2005 year, Princeton qualified for the NCAA Division I Men's Lacrosse Championship in 2006 & 2007.

== Professional career ==
Hewit took a job with Lehman Brothers after graduating from Princeton. He was signed by New Jersey Pride for the 2008 MLL season.

== Notes ==
Preceded by Aaron Fenton	Ensign C. Markland Kelly, Jr. Award; 2006	Succeeded by Matt McMonagle
