= Goaltender (field lacrosse) =

Player who blocks goal in field lacrosse

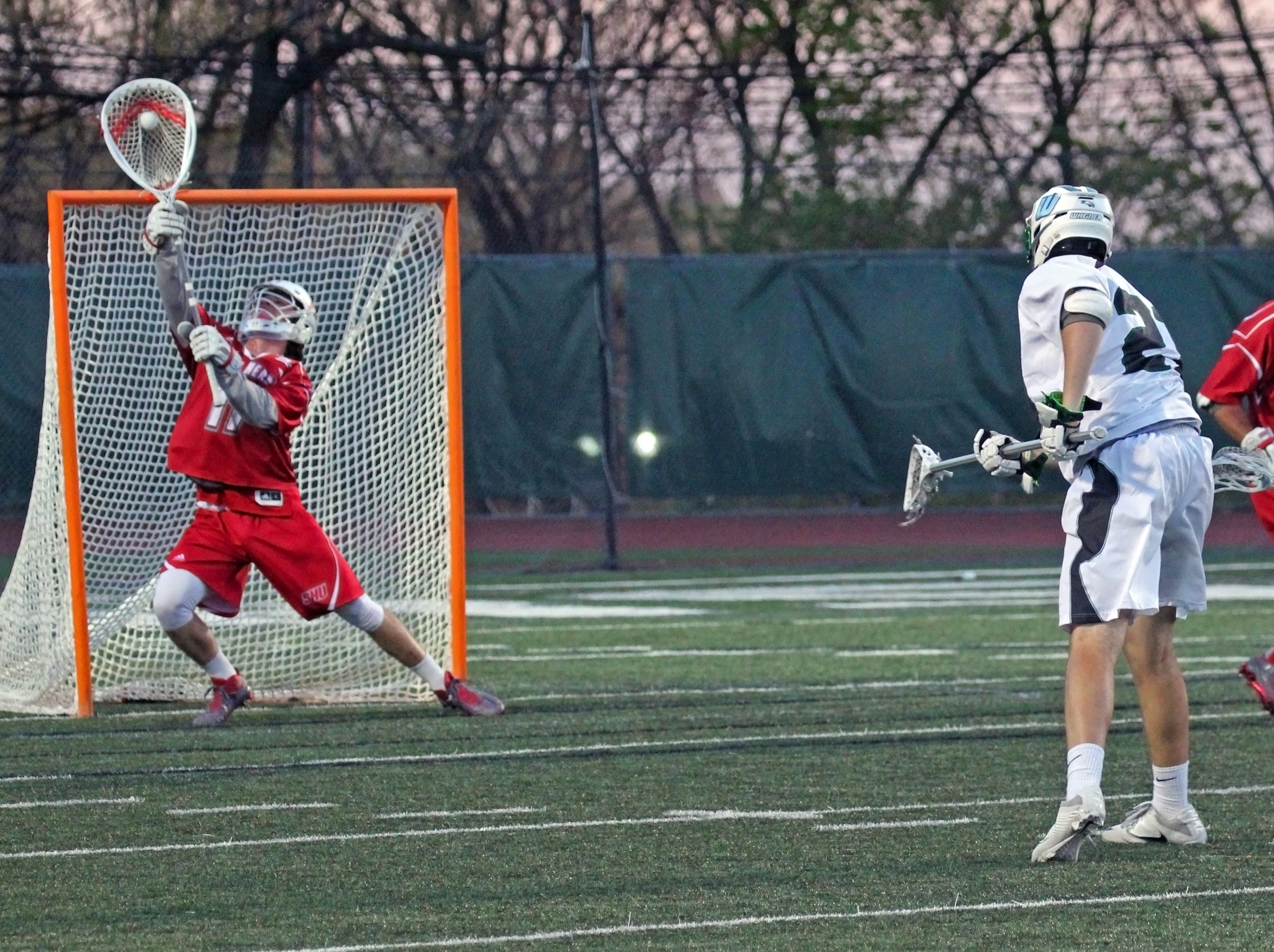
A Sacred Heart goaltender stops a Wagner College player's shot.

In field lacrosse, the goaltender (goalie, goalkeeper, or the keeper) is the most important and last line of defense between the opposing offense and the goal. The goaltender's primary roles are to defend the opposing team's shots on goal and to direct the defense.

== Rules ==
Goaltenders are the only ones on the field who can touch the ball with their hands. However, they are not allowed to pick up or control the ball with their hands. Hand touches are legal only when in the crease. Each team has a goaltender on the field at all times. If the goaltender stops a shot by the opposing team, or picks the ball up any other way, the goaltender has four seconds in the crease to pass the ball or run with the ball. If the goaltender fails to do so, the ball will be awarded to the opposing team. After those four seconds, the goaltender must leave the crease. After the goaltender leaves the crease, they are given 20 seconds to "clear" the ball past the half of the field; if the goaltender fails to do so, the ball will be awarded to the opposing team.

== Equipment ==
A goaltender is required to wear certain protective gear. Every goaltender must wear gloves, a chest protector, a helmet, a throat guard, a mouth guard, and a protective cup. They optionally wear a padded girdle covering the waist to the thigh and elbow pads. Goaltenders' lacrosse stick can vary between the length of the short and long sticks of field players depending on age and preference. The head of the goalie's stick can be up to 12 inches at its widest point.

== Role ==
The goaltender's role is to prevent the ball from going into the goal. Primarily, goalies use their stick to block shots. However, many saves are off the goalie's body or helmet.

== Penalties ==
The goaltender is treated like a field player for all technical and personal fouls. In addition, upon controlling the ball in his stick within the crease, the goalie has four seconds to either pass or run the ball outside of the crease. No player may carry the ball into the crease, but a goalie in the crease can receive a pass, at which point a four-second count begins. Outside the crease, the goaltender has no special protections, and may bring the ball into the offensive zone and even score.

== Notable field lacrosse goaltenders ==
- Drew Adams
- Scott Bacigalupo
- Jim Beardmore
- Greg Cattrano
- Brian Dougherty
- Chris Garrity
- CJ Kemp
- Quint Kessenich
- Cookie Krongard
- Sal LoCascio
- Daniel R. Mackesey
- Brett Queener
- Larry Quinn
- Blaze Riorden
- Chris Sanderson
- Doc Schneider
- Jesse Schwartzman
- Jack Starr
- Trevor Tierney

== Records ==
Brett Queener holds the NCAA record for most goals scored by a goaltender, with five career goals. Greg Cattrano and Brian Dougherty hold the record as three time Major League Lacrosse Goaltender of the Year Award winners. Cattrano is the only goaltender to have won the Major League Lacrosse MVP Award.

== See also ==
- Goaltender (box lacrosse)
- Ensign C. Markland Kelly, Jr. Award, presented annually to the top goaltender in NCAA
- Major League Lacrosse Goaltender of the Year Award, presented annually to the top goaltender in the MLL
- Tewaaraton Award
