= VF-8 =

Two US Navy squadrons with that designation existed:

- VF-8 (1941–1942)
- VF-8 (1943–1945)
