= Beardmore =

Beardmore can refer to:

- Andrew Beardmore, better known as Andy Moor, English trance DJ, producer and remixer
- Bob Beardmore (born 1960), British rugby league footballer
- Bud Beardmore (1939–2016), American lacrosse coach
- Jim Beardmore, Former All-American lacrosse goalie and current coach
- Nathaniel Beardmore (1816-1872), British engineer and hydrologist
- William Beardmore, 1st Baron Invernairn, a Scottish industrialist

- William Beardmore and Company, the engineering company of the above Beardmore
- Beardmore 160 hp, a water-cooled aero engine built for the above company

- Beardmore, Ontario, a small community in Northern Ontario
- Beardmore Glacier, a glacier in Antarctica
- Beardmore Relics, Viking Age artifacts 'found' near Beardmore, Ontario; supposedly evidence of Vikings in Ontario.
