= Peter Trombino =

Lacrosse player (born 1985)

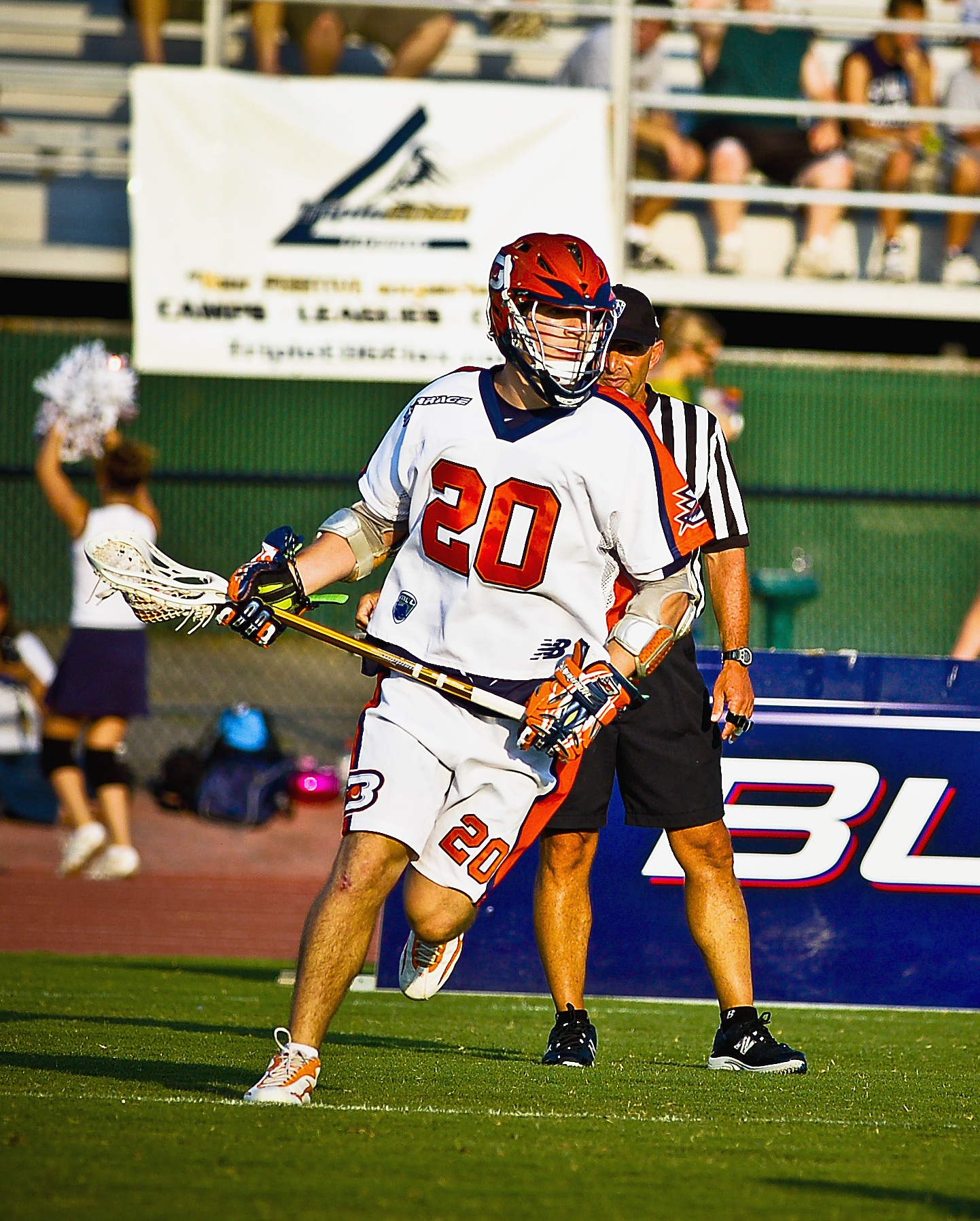

Personal information
- Nationality: American
- Born: September 23, 1985 (age 40)
- Website: Lax.com webpage

Sport
- Position: attackman
- MLL teams: Philadelphia Barrage (2007–2008)
- NCAA team: Princeton University
- Pro career: 2007–2008

Career highlights
- College highlights: Men's Ivy League Rookie of the Year (2004); All-American 2x (honorable mention: 2006 & 2007); All-Ivy League (1st team: 2007; 2nd team: 2005 & 2006)

Peter Trombino is a retired lacrosse attackman who played professional field lacrosse in the Major League Lacrosse (MLL) from 2007 to 2008. He starred as a member of the Princeton Tigers men's lacrosse team from 2004 through 2007. He earned Ivy League Rookie of the Year honors, two United States Intercollegiate Lacrosse Association (USILA) All-American honorable mention recognitions and three All-Ivy League selections (one first team and two second team). During his college career, Princeton earned two Ivy League championships and three NCAA Men's Lacrosse Championship tournament invitations. In high school, he won a state championship in lacrosse and two league championships in American football.

== Background ==
Born September 23, 1985, Trombino is the son of Anthony and Cathleen Trombino. His brother Brian played lacrosse at Hofstra. He also has a younger brother Christopher and younger sister Elizabeth. Trombino attended St. Anthony's, which is a Roman Catholic college preparatory private high school, in South Huntington, New York on Long Island. He participated on both the lacrosse and American football teams in high school. Trombino also competed in the Empire State Games in lacrosse. He earned varsity letters in both lacrosse and American high school football for the St. Anthony's Friars.

In American football, as a junior in high school, Trombino made a fourth quarter interception in the end zone to help St. Anthony's earn a Long Island Catholic High School Football League championship game in high school football. He played cornerback on the two-time league champions who went 22–1 during his career.

In lacrosse, Trombino was an all-Long Island selection. He led his school to a 20–1 record and the Catholic League state championship during his senior year. Additionally, he was an Empire State Games gold medalist.

== College career ==
Trombino attended Princeton University where he was a history major. He was also a lacrosse player for four years and is the only Princeton player to have at least 20 goals and 10 assists each year of a four-year career. Princeton qualified for the NCAA Men's Lacrosse Championship in three of Trombino's four years (2004, 2006 & 2007).

As a freshman, Trombino was expected to be a midfielder, but he surprisingly earned a spot in the first team attack unit. He became the first Princeton freshman to score at least one goal in all 15 of his games (the prior record had been a goal in 10 different games). Trombino was the 2004 Men's Ivy League Rookie of the Year. The team were Ivy League co-champions with Cornell. As a freshman in the 2004 NCAA Division I Men's Lacrosse Championship, he scored an overtime game-winning goal in a 9–8 quarterfinals victory over Maryland that was set up by Ryan Boyle. However, in the semifinals the following week against Navy, Trombino's shot was stopped with eight seconds left in the 8–7 loss.

In 2005, Trombino was Princeton's leading scorer. He was a second team All-Ivy League selection. In March 2006, Trombino scored two goals and an assist in the defeat of Johns Hopkins that ended the defending national champion Blue Jays' 17-game winning streak and 37-game (38 was the NCAA record) home winning streak. In the game, he had to shift from attack to midfield in the second half when Mike Gaudio suffered a knee injury. The team finished the season as Ivy League co-champion with Cornell. He was a second team All-Ivy League selection that year as well as an honorable mention USILA All-American Team selection. In the 2006 NCAA Division I Men's Lacrosse Championship first round 11–8 victory over UMBC Trombino scored two goals and had two assists. In the quarterfinals, Princeton was eliminated by Maryland 11–6 in the subsequent game.

Princeton qualified for the 2007 NCAA Division I Men's Lacrosse Championship, but was eliminated by Georgetown 9–8 in the first round. In 2007, Trombino was a first team All-Ivy League selection. He was an honorable mention USILA All-American Team selection. As a senior, Trombino served as co-captain of the 2007 team. He wrote his senior thesis on The Influence of Sir William Johnson Among the Iroquois Indians.

== Professional career ==
He played with the Philadelphia Barrage during the 2007 and 2008 seasons. During the 2008 season with the Philadelphia Barrage, he once scored nine goals over a two-game stretch on the road (against the New Jersey Pride and Los Angeles Riptide). He only appeared in one game for Philadelphia in 2007. However, in 2008, he played in 10 games and scored fifteen goals, including one two-pointer, and had seven assists. He had a total of thirty-eight shot attempts in his career, all in 2008.

== Notes ==
Preceded by Jamie Coffin	Men's Lacrosse Ivy League Rookie of the Year; 2004	Succeeded by Dan Cocoziello
