= Doc Schneider =

American lacrosse player

- Born: April 25, 1987 (age 37); Massapequa, New York
- Nationality: American
- Height: 5 ft 9 in (1.75 m)
- Weight: 185 pounds (84 kg)
- Position: Goaltender
- MLL team Former teams: Free Agent; Hamilton Nationals
- Former NCAA team: University of Massachusetts Amherst
- Pro career: 2009–
- Nickname: Doc

Jonathan David "Doc" Schneider (born April 25, 1987, in Massapequa, New York) is a goaltender formerly of the Hamilton Nationals of Major League Lacrosse.

== Early life ==
Schneider, who is Jewish, acquired the nickname 'Doc' from his family. He is the son of Roni and Irwin Schneider.

== College ==
Previously he was the goaltender for the UMass Minutemen where he made the 2006 NCAA All Tournament Team and was a 2007 candidate and 2009 finalist for the Tewaaraton Trophy. His 548 career saves rank him in fourth place at the school.

In July 2008 the Jewish Sports Review named Schneider a First-Team Jewish All-American.

=== MLL ===
		Regular Season									Playoffs
Year	Team	GP	Min	W	L	GA	GAA	2ptGA	Sv	SvPct	GP	Min	W	L	GA	GAA	2ptGA	Sv	SvPct
2009	Toronto	8	275:55	1	2	72	15.66%	3	90	55.6%	2	91:23	1	0	18	11.82	0	19	51.4%
2010	Toronto	-	-	-	-	-	-	-	-	-	-	-	-	-	-	-	-	-	-
MLL Totals		8	275:55	1	2	72	15.66%	3	90	55.6%	2	91:23	1	0	18	11.82	0	19	51.4%
