= Dan Cocoziello =

Lacrosse defenseman (born 1985)

Personal information
- Nationality: American
- Born: August 8, 1985 (age 41) Oldwick, New Jersey, U.S.
- Height: 6 ft 0 in (183 cm)
- Weight: 220 lb (100 kg; 15 st 10 lb)
- Website: MLL webpage

Sport
- Position: Defenseman
- NLL draft: 72nd overall, 2008; New York Titans
- NLL team Former teams: Philadelphia Wings (2010–present); Orlando Titans (2009)* *appeared in no games
- MLL team Former teams: Boston Cannons (2010–present); Denver Outlaws (2008); Toronto Nationals (2009)* *appeared in no games
- NCAA team: Princeton University
- Pro career: 2008–

Career highlights
- College highlights: Men's Ivy League Rookie of the Year (2005); All-American 3x (1st team: 2008; 2nd team: 2006 & 2007); All-Ivy League (1st team: 2006 & 2008; 2nd team: 2007; honorable mention: 2005)

Daniel F. Cocoziello (born August 8, 1985) is a lacrosse defenseman who plays professional field lacrosse in the Major League Lacrosse (MLL). He starred as a member of the Princeton Tigers men's lacrosse team from 2005 through 2008 where he started every game. He is the only defenseman to have earned the Men's Ivy League Rookie of the Year. He was a three-time United States Intercollegiate Lacrosse Association (USILA) All-American (once first team and twice second team) and three-time All-Ivy League selection (twice first team and once second team). During his college career, Princeton earned an Ivy League championship and two NCAA Men's Lacrosse Championship invitations. In high school, he won three state lacrosse championships.

== Background ==
Born in the Oldwick section of Tewksbury Township, New Jersey, Cocoziello was a baseball and soccer player in his youth. He attended elementary school at Gill St. Bernard's School in New Jersey. He met his middle school, high school and college teammate Alex Hewit taking an entrance exam for New Jersey's Delbarton School in sixth grade. Even in seventh grade at Delbarton, Cocoziello was still a baseball player who was introduced to lacrosse during lunch and free periods with his classmates. He eventually got a lacrosse stick and started practicing as much as he could. In eighth grade, he joined the school team and made a New Jersey state eighth-grade all-star team along with Hewit that competed against all-stars from other states. He eventually joined the varsity team and helped lead the team to a cumulative 63–4 record and three high school lacrosse state championships. He was regarded as the best high school lacrosse recruit in the nation in the 2003, according to Inside Lacrosse. He played linebacker in high school football and was offered a scholarship to play for Hofstra University, but opted to play lacrosse at Princeton.

== College career ==
He started every game of his career at Princeton, where he earned the 2005 Men's Ivy League Rookie of the Year, the only defensemen to every to garner the award. That year he was an honorable mention All-Ivy League selection. He was also the first defenseman to win the Ivy League Rookie of the Year award. He was a first team All-Ivy League choice in 2006 & 2008 and second team choice in 2007 He was a first team USILA All-American Team selection in 2008 and second team selection in 2006 and 2007. He served as co-captain of the 2008 team along with longtime teammate Alex Hewit and Bob Schneider. The 2006 team was Ivy League co-champion with Cornell. Princeton qualified for the NCAA Men's Lacrosse Championship in 2006 & 2007. During Cocoziello's junior year, while playing in a scrimmage against Towson University, broke his vehicular bone in his left foot. Originally diagnosed as a sprain, Cocoziello played his entire junior and senior season on the broken foot. Upon graduation in 2008 (he completed a senior thesis in history under the supervision of John Haldon), he was correctly diagnosed and underwent reconstructive surgery following his 2008 MLL Season with the Denver Outlaws. The surgery was unsuccessful causing Cocoziello to discontinue playing lacrosse.

== Professional career ==
Cocoziello began his MLL career with the Denver Outlaws during the 2008 MLL season. On February 20, 2009, he was reassigned to the Toronto Nationals. In 2010, he was a member of the Boston Cannons.

He has appeared in no National Lacrosse League games. However, his National Lacrosse League rights were acquired by the Philadelphia Wings in the 2010 Orlando Titans dispersal draft.

=== MLL statistics ===
The following are his MLL career stats:

		Regular Season							Playoffs
Season	Team	GP	G	2ptG	A	Pts	LB	PIM	GP	G	2ptG	A	Pts	LB	PIM
2008	Denver	6	0	0	0	0	13	2	2	0	0	0	0	3	0
MLL Totals		6	0	0	0	0	13	2	2	0	0	0	0	3	0

== Life after the MLL ==
Cocoziello currently lives in New York City where he works in real estate for New York-based StructureTone, Inc. He is also pursuing a Master's in Real Estate from New York University.

Preceded by Peter Trombino	Men's Lacrosse Ivy League Rookie of the Year; 2005	Succeeded by Max Seibald
