= Scully–Fahey Field =

Lacrosse venue in Hanover, New Hampshire

Coordinates: 43°42′00″N 72°16′40″W

Scully-Fahey Field
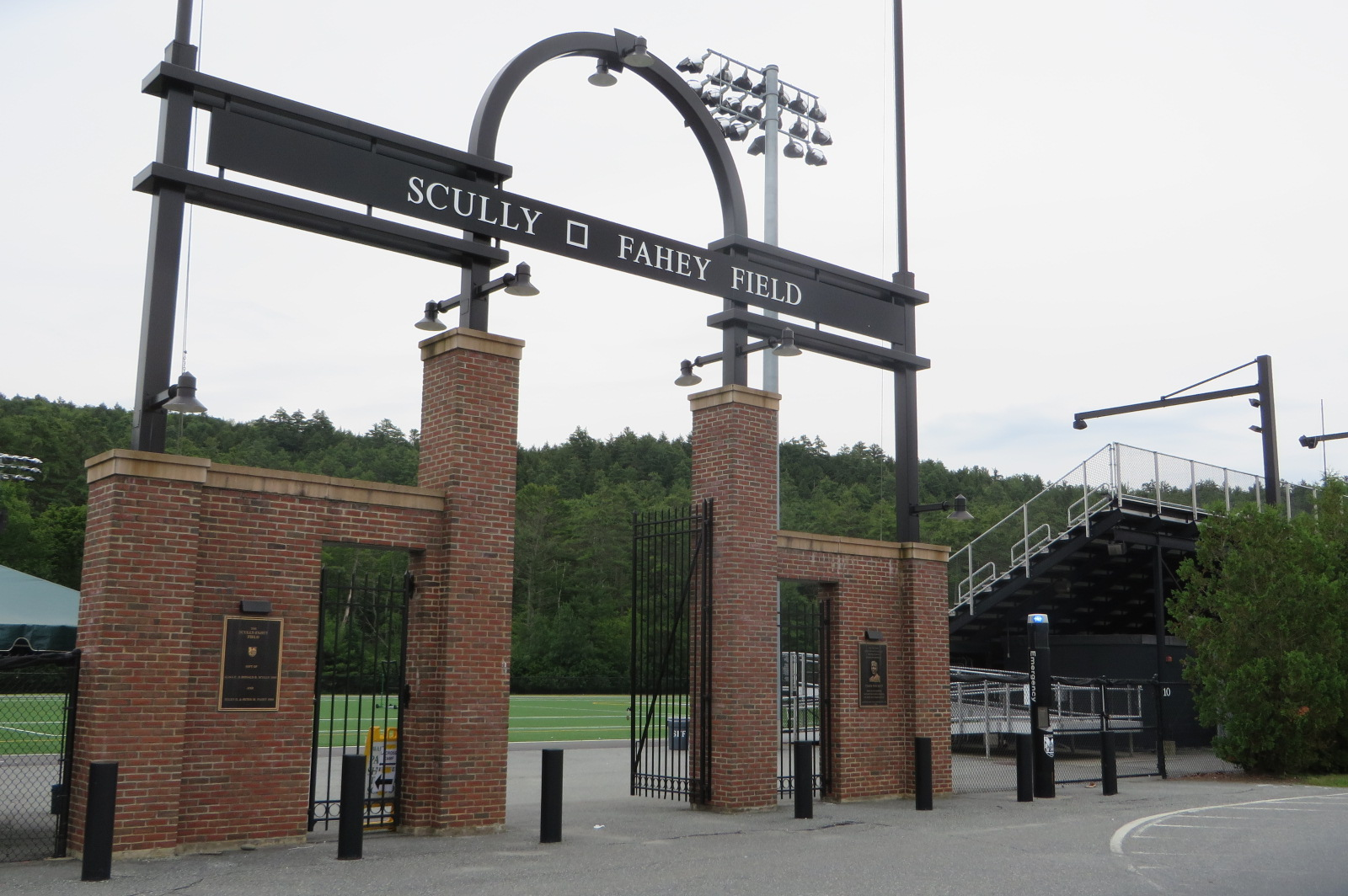
- Entrance to Scully–Fahey Field
- Interactive map of Scully-Fahey Field
- Location: Hanover, NH
- Owner: Dartmouth College
- Capacity: 1,600
- Field size: 86,400 sq ft

Construction
- Built: 2000
- Renovated: 2009
- Cost: $4.4 million

Tenants
- Dartmouth Big Green men's lacrosse, women's lacrosse (2000–present)

Scully–Fahey Field is a lacrosse venue located on the campus of Dartmouth College in Hanover, New Hampshire. It is the home field of the Dartmouth men's and women's lacrosse teams. It was built in 2000 with an AstroTurf surface at a cost of $4.4 million. It measures 86,400 square feet (8,030 m^{2}) and has a capacity for 1,600 spectators. This was replaced with a more grass-like FieldTurf surface in 2009.

The field is named in honor of Donald Scully and Peter Fahey. Scully graduated from Dartmouth in 1949 and played on its lacrosse and soccer teams, and was a two-time USILA All-American with 107 career goals to his credit. Fahey received his undergraduate degree in 1968 and a graduate degree from the Thayer School of Engineering in 1970, and played basketball and competed in track at the school.
