= Dartmouth Big Green =

Sports teams of Dartmouth College, New Hampshire, USA

- University: Dartmouth College
- NCAA: Division I (FCS)
- Conference: Ivy League (primary); Other conferences: List: ECAC Hockey; NEISA (sailing); EISA (skiing); EARC (rowing); ECAC (equestrian); CSA (squash)
- Athletic director: Harry Sheehy
- Location: Hanover, New Hampshire
- Varsity teams: 34 varsity
- Football stadium: Memorial Field
- Basketball arena: Leede Arena
- Baseball stadium: Red Rolfe Field at Biondi Park
- Softball stadium: Dartmouth Softball Park
- Soccer stadium: Burnham Field
- Lacrosse stadium: Scully-Fahey Field
- Rowing venue: Friends of Dartmouth Rowing Boathouse
- Sailing venue: Arthur E. Allen Boathouse
- Volleyball arena: Leede Arena
- Other venues: Leverone Field House; Thompson Arena
- Colors: Dartmouth green and white
- Mascot: Big Green
- Fight song: As the Backs Go Tearing By
- Website: dartmouthsports.com
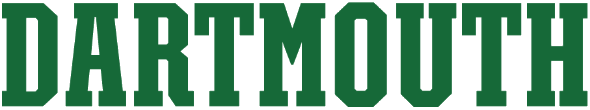

The Dartmouth College Big Green are the varsity and club athletic teams representing Dartmouth College, an American university located in Hanover, New Hampshire. Dartmouth's teams compete at the National Collegiate Athletic Association (NCAA) Division I level as a member of the Ivy League conference, as well as in the ECAC Hockey conference. The college features 34 varsity teams, 17 club sports, and 24 intramural teams. Sports teams are heavily ingrained in the culture of the college and serve as a social outlet, with 75% of the student body participating in some form of athletics.

== Nickname, symbol, and mascot ==
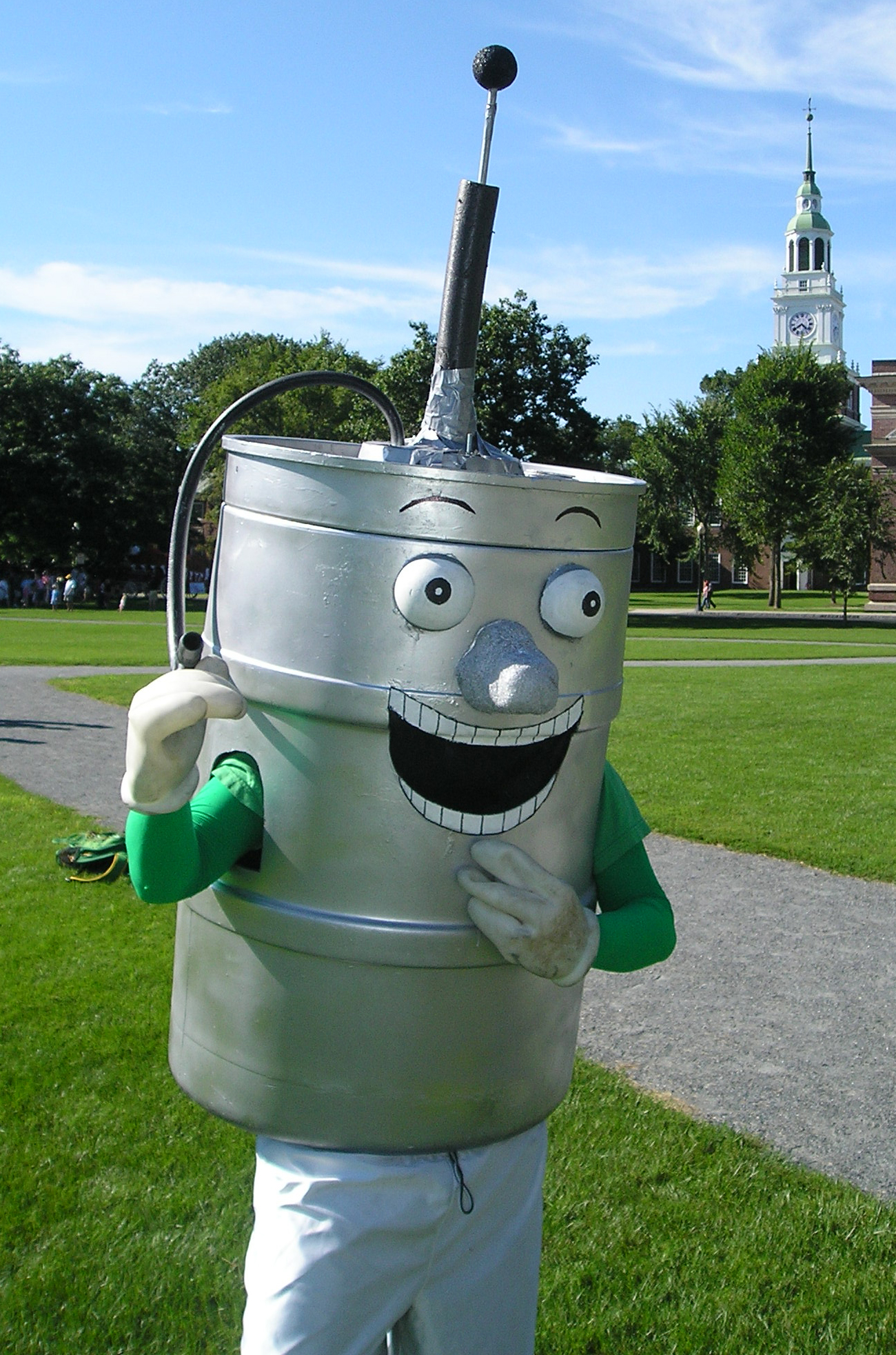
Keggy the Keg, a satirical, non-official mascot, posing on the Dartmouth College Green with Baker Memorial Library in the background

The students adopted a shade of forest green ("Dartmouth Green") as the school's official color in 1866. Beginning in the 1920s, the Dartmouth College athletic teams were known by their unofficial nickname "the Indians," a moniker that probably originated among sports journalists. This unofficial mascot and team name was used until the early 1970s, when its use came under criticism. In 1974, the Trustees declared the "use of the [Indian] symbol in any form to be inconsistent with present institutional and academic objectives of the College in advancing Native American education."

Some alumni and students, as well as the conservative student newspaper, The Dartmouth Review, have sought to return the Indian symbol to prominence, but no team has worn the symbol on its uniform in decades. The new nickname was inspired by The Dartmouth Green in the center of campus. The 'Big Green' nickname also echoes Cornell's 'Big Red' moniker - Cornell has used 'Big Red' for its sports teams since 1905.

== Varsity teams ==
Men's sports	Women's sports
Baseball	Basketball
Basketball	Cross Country
Cross country	Equestrian
Football	Field hockey
Golf	Golf
Ice hockey	Ice hockey
Lacrosse	Lacrosse
Rowing	Rowing
Skiing	Rugby
Soccer	Skiing
Squash	Soccer
Swimming & diving	Softball
Tennis	Squash
Track & field^{†}	Swimming and diving
	Tennis
	Track & field ^{†}
	Volleyball
Co-ed sports
Sailing
† – Track and field includes both indoor and outdoor

=== Baseball ===
The baseball team plays at Red Rolfe Field at Biondi Park, which, in 2009, underwent renovations that added an artificial turf surface. The team won Ivy League Championships in its first two seasons at the facility (2009 and 2010).

=== Basketball ===
Dartmouth competed in two NCAA Men's Division I Basketball Championship games but came up short both times. In 1942, Dartmouth was runner-up to Stanford University and lost to the University of Utah in 1944.

=== Rowing ===
Students first began rowing at Dartmouth in 1833, and since then it has grown to be the most popular sport at Dartmouth, with over 200 students participating every year. Dartmouth's first professional coach was the legendary professional oarsman, John Biglin, who was also the subject of many Thomas Eakins paintings from that era. Today, the Dartmouth Rowing Club consists of three varsity programs: Men's Heavyweight, Men's Lightweight, and Women's Openweight. The men's teams compete in the Eastern Association of Rowing Colleges (EARC) while the women's team competes in the Eastern Association of Women's Rowing Colleges (EAWRC).

All teams train out of the Friends of Dartmouth Rowing Boathouse, located on the Connecticut River which runs along the western edge of the campus. The river provides more than 40 miles (64 km) of flat rowable water, with virtually no powerboat or other traffic, but teams must deal with the river's late winter thaw. Other facilities include two smaller boathouses, rowing tanks, the varsity weight room, and two ergometer rooms. Dartmouth's relatively small programs have produced an outsized number of Olympians and National Team Members.

Teams train for and race in long-distance head races in the fall. Because the river freezes, winter training consists of intense indoor training as well as cross-country skiing which is generally regarded as a blessing in disguise. The spring season consists of shorter 2000m sprint races against traditional Ivy League and Eastern Sprints opponents. The season for both men's heavyweight and lightweight programs culminate in the Eastern Sprints and IRA regattas. The women's team competes in the Ivy League to qualify for the women's national championship.

The Dartmouth men's varsity heavyweight eights rowing team finished in 3rd place at the IRA National Championships in 2025 and in 2nd place at Eastern Sprints that same year. During the 2026 spring season, the Dartmouth men's heavyweight eights program swept Yale University, Boston University, the University of Wisconsin, and Georgetown University as well as Hobart University. The program also defeated Syracuse University in the first, third, fourth and fifth varsity races, and Brown University in the second, third and fourth varsity races.

=== Cycling ===
The Dartmouth Cycling Team was founded in 1961 and has become one of the most successful club sports at the college. The team races in Division II and has won three national titles, most recently in 2004. Additionally, Dartmouth Cycling has had several Individual National Champions most recently in 2010. Throughout its history, the Dartmouth Cycling team has won the Ivy League title seven times, most recently in 2017. The Team is a group of students (undergrad and graduate) who enjoy cycling. The team rides and races together on a regular basis, and runs the gamut of skill experience from expert to Cat. 5. While the spring Eastern Conference Road season is the main focus, Dartmouth cycling also regularly sends riders to Fall Mountain Bike and Cyclocross races.

=== Equestrian ===
The Dartmouth Equestrian team is based at Morton Farm in Etna, New Hampshire. They have frequent success at regional and national levels.

=== Football ===
In 1925, Dartmouth was recognized as a national champion by completing an 8–0 undefeated season. Dartmouth won the Ivy League title in 1958, 1962, 1963, 1965, 1966, 1969, 1970, 1971, 1972, 1973, 1978, 1981, 1982, 1990, 1991, 1992, 1996, 2015, 2019, 2021 and 2023. NFL quarterback Jay Fiedler played for the team.

=== Men's golf ===
The men's golf team has won one national championship (1921) and crowned one individual national champion (Pollack Boyd in 1922). The team has won two Ivy League championships since the League championship was started in 1975: 1978 and 1983.

=== Lacrosse ===
In 2003, Dartmouth's Men's Lacrosse team posted one of the most famous upsets in lacrosse history when unranked Dartmouth played #2 Princeton at Princeton's Class of 1952 Field. Dartmouth, having finished last in the Ivy League in 2002, were ten goal underdogs against Princeton, the defending Ivy League champs going into the game. Nevertheless, Dartmouth prevailed and stunned the Tigers 13–6. Dartmouth went on to win the Ivy League title and qualify for the NCAA tournament.

In 2006, Dartmouth Women's Lacrosse lost to Northwestern University, the defending national champion, at the NCAA Division I Women's Lacrosse Championship.

=== Ski ===
The Dartmouth Ski Team won the NCAA national championship in 1958, 1976 (tied with Colorado), and 2007. The team finished in second place in 1955, 1956, 1964, 1969, and 1970. The team has finished in the top 5 of the NCAA Skiing Championship 44 times.

The Dartmouth Ski Team hosted the 2025 NCAA national championship in March 2025 at The Dartmouth Skiway (alpine events) and Oak Hill (nordic events). Twelve Dartmouth athletes were selected by the NCAA to participate in the championship, and the team finished third. On March 6, John Steel Hagenbuch D25 won the Men’s 7.5 km Individual Classical event after finishing second in the Men’s 20 km Individual Freestyle event. Other notable finishers included Jasmine Drolet D25, who placed 3rd in the Women’s 7.5 km Individual Classical event, and Benny Brown D27, who finished second in the Giant Slalom.

=== Soccer ===
The school fields men's and women's teams. The women's team has won 6 Ivy League Titles and been to 10 NCAA Tournaments. The men's team has won 10 Ivy League Titles and been to 15 NCAA championships.

=== Softball ===
In the 2014 season, the Big Green won their first Ivy League title in program history and made their first appearance in the NCAA Division I softball tournament. They lost in the first round of the Tempe regional.

They repeated as Ivy League Champion in 2015 only to lose in the first round of the Tallahassee regional.

=== Squash ===
The squash courts are home to the Dartmouth Men's and Women's Squash teams, both of which are perennial competitors in the ivy-league and consistently ranked in the top ten nationally. Thirteen Big Green men and eight women have earned All-Ivy honors since the 1970s. Additionally, with the teams' training and hosting matches on ten international courts in the John Berry Sports Center, Dartmouth has hosted the men's and women's Intercollegiate Squash Association Championships four times – in 1988, 1991, 1997, and 2005 – as well as the national junior championships three times, most recently in 1996.

=== Swimming ===
The men's varsity swim team at Dartmouth College began in 1920, making it one of the oldest continuous collegiate swim programs in the United States. The swim team competes in the Eastern Intercollegiate Swim League, which includes all eight Ivy League schools and the US Naval Academy. The team's season begins in mid-September and continues until late March, during which the EISL Championships take place. During the season the team has weekly competitions, against EISL member teams as well as several other New England college teams. The team practices and hosts meet in the Dartmouth College Aquatic Facilities' Karl Michael Competition Pool & the Spaulding Pool, both located in Alumni Gymnasium.

The team has a long tradition of success within the league as well as nationally. During the 1930s, the team rose to prominence within the league, garnering multiple championship titles and sending several swimmers and relays to the NCAA Championships. More recently, its 200 freestyle relay team was ranked in the top 50 in the nation.

In 2002, Dartmouth College was forced to cut both the men's and women's swim teams as a result of the school's financial troubles and forced budgetary cuts. The cutting of the swim teams received national attention after a member placed the team on EBay in an effort to raise money for the team. After significant lobbying and fundraising by students, alumni, and supporters, both the men's and women's teams were reinstated under the John C. Glover Fund for the Support of Swimming and Diving. The fund was named after John C. Glover, an all America swimmer for Dartmouth in the class of 1955, who died while training for the Olympics at Yale University in 1956.

=== Track and field ===
Dartmouth's men's and women's track and field team include 23 Olympians and 61 All-Americans. Dartmouth Olympians in the sport of track and field have won 13 Olympic medals, 4 of them gold. Men's and Women's Head Coach is Porscha Dobson, who is entering her first season in 2021.

=== Volleyball ===
Dartmouth has a volleyball team.

== Championships ==
=== NCAA team championships ===
Dartmouth has 4 NCAA team national championships.

- Men's (3)
  - Golf ^{†} (1): 1921
  - Skiing (2): 1958, 1976
- Co-ed (1)
  - Skiing (1): 2007

† The NCAA started sponsoring the intercollegiate golf championship in 1939, but it retained the titles from the 41 championships previously conferred by the National Intercollegiate Golf Association in its records.

- see also:
  - Ivy League NCAA team championships
  - List of NCAA schools with the most NCAA Division I championships

=== Other team championships ===
Below are four national team titles that were not bestowed by the NCAA:

- Men's
  - Football (1): 1925
- Women's
  - Sailing (3): 1992, 2000, 2013

== Notable club sports ==
=== Rugby ===
The Dartmouth Rugby Football Club (or DRFC) was founded in 1951 and competes in the Ivy Rugby Conference against its traditional Ivy League rivals. Dartmouth has been led by coach Gavin Hickie since 2012, following the departure of former head coach Alexander Magleby who in 2012 became head coach of the US national rugby team.

Dartmouth has enjoyed success on a national stage. In 1965, the first XV was undefeated and was declared the unofficial national collegiate champion. During the 1980s, Dartmouth twice reached the finals of the US national collegiate championship losing both times to Cal, and since 1980 Dartmouth has reached the semi-finals three times. In the 2012–13 season, Dartmouth played in two post-season competitions. Dartmouth played in the newly formed Varsity Cup, losing to Navy in the quarterfinals. Dartmouth also played in the D1-AA national playoffs, beating Pitt 43–34 in the round of 16, and defeating St. Bonaventure 30–22 in the quarterfinals, before falling in the semifinals to Central Florida 45–38.

Dartmouth has been successful in national rugby sevens competitions. In 2011, Dartmouth defeated Army 32–10 for the men's championship in the Collegiate Rugby Championship in a match broadcast live on NBC from PPL Park in Philadelphia. Dartmouth repeated as champions in the 2012 Collegiate Rugby Championship, defeating Cal 21–19 in the semifinal and beating Arizona 24–5 in the final. Dartmouth went 5–1 at the 2012 USA Rugby Sevens Collegiate National Championships to win the consolation bracket. At the 2013 USA Rugby Sevens Collegiate National Championships, Dartmouth went 4–1, reaching the semifinals.

=== Ultimate Frisbee ===
The Dartmouth Ultimate Frisbee team was first established in 1977 at Dartmouth College, originally named "The Blossom Brothers." The team's origins and development in many ways parallel the development of the sport of Ultimate itself. The initially relaxed, informal sport gave way to a more competitive sport, with rules and procedures outlined by the Ultimate Players Association. In the same way, the Dartmouth team now trains with a combination of track workouts, weight-lifting, plyometrics, and Ultimate strategies. Although the team is not a varsity or NCAA-recognized team, the intensity of their practices and workouts is similar to that of many varsity sports teams.

The Dartmouth men's ultimate team first gained recognition when it competed in the college National series in 2003. Dartmouth placed low in the series, but since has been a leading presence in the Northeast region. The team's current rivals in the Northeast region are Redline and E-Men, from Harvard University and Tufts University, respectively. In 2008, the team qualified for UPA College Nationals a second time and tied for 13th place.

The Dartmouth women's ultimate team, named Princess Layout, competed in the national series for the first time in 2004 where they tied for 9th place. Since then, they have become a force to be reckoned with in the Northeast region, placing first at Regionals and tying for 11th at Nationals in 2005, and placing first at Regionals and tying for 5th at Nationals in 2006. The team again placed first at Regionals in 2007, 15th at Nationals. In 2009, Princess placed second at Regionals and placed 13th at Nationals. In 2015, they again took first at Regionals and finished tied for 5th at Nationals. In each of 2017 and 2018, they won Nationals and in 2019 they took second at Nationals.

The men's team has experimented with several names over the past two decades: before attending Nationals in 2003, Dartmouth's team name was the Dartmouth Pirates. When attending Nationals in 2003, the team renamed itself "Pain Train," taken from the Terry Tate: Office Linebacker Reebok ads.

Current funding is provided in small part by Dartmouth's club sports fund, while the majority of funds are raised by members and fundraising activities.

=== Club soccer ===
Dartmouth Men's Club Soccer is the student-run club soccer program at the college. It is student-led but officially recognized by Dartmouth, a status that allows it to draw funding from the Athletics Department and to use college vehicles for travel; the club described the 2025 season as its 23rd year of official recognition.

The program fields two sides, an A team and a B team, both of which compete in the New England North division of NIRSA Region 1 club soccer during the fall term, playing toward a regional playoff tournament held in late October. The team practices three days a week in season, encourages conditioning on off days, and trains indoors over the winter.

Region 1 does not run a spring season. The A team's spring schedule consists of friendlies, twice-weekly practice, and the annual Ivy League club tournament, hosted each year by the previous champion. The B team carries the heavier competitive spring workload of the two sides, representing Dartmouth in the New England Premier League. NEPL is a spring college club soccer league founded in 2011 to fill the competitive gap in a semester that would otherwise consist of scattered friendlies; it spans the six New England states and New York, and fielded 71 men's and 25 women's teams in its 2026 season, with Dartmouth listed in the Mountain division.

The B team plays its own fixtures within the fall schedule, meeting the second sides of regional opponents such as the University of Vermont, and occasionally faces the Dartmouth A team directly. The B team also maintains the club's most visible social media presence: the program's official website directs prospective and current players to the B team's Instagram account, @dartmouth_mens_club_b_soccer, as the team account rather than to a separate A team page.

== Facilities ==
Venue	Image	Opened	Sport(s), notes	Ref.
Berry Sports Center		1987	Racquetball and basketball facilities (Leede Arena).	
Boss Tennis Center		2000	Located behind Thompson Arena, contains six regulation tennis courts. The attached Alan Gordon Pavilion provides locker rooms and a lounge.	
Burnham Field		2007	Burnham Field, located next to Thompson Arena, hosts men's and women's soccer teams in the 1,600-seat stadium.	
Davis Field House		1927	Davis Field House, which overlooks the Memorial Field track, is a facility for varsity athletic teams.	
Floren Varsity House		2007	Floren contains a strength training center, a sports classroom, meeting rooms, locker rooms, equipment storage, and team offices.	
Friends of Dartmouth Rowing Boathouse		1986	The Boathouse sits on the banks of the Connecticut River, just north of the Ledyard Bridge.	
Leverone Field House		1965	Designed by Italian architect Pier Luigi Nervi, Leverone contains an indoor track and tennis courts.	
Memorial Field		1923	Memorial Field, Dartmouth's football and track & field stadium, was built on the site of previous athletic grandstands. It is named in memory of the Dartmouth alumni who died in World War I.	
Thompson Arena		1975	Thompson Arena, Dartmouth's hockey facility, was also designed by Pier Luigi Nervi.	
The Corey Ford Rugby Clubhouse		2005	The CFRC is the home of the Dartmouth Rugby Football Club and the Dartmouth Women's Rugby Club.	
Jonathan Belden Daniels Climbing Gym		1995	The Jonathan Belden Daniels Climbing Gym houses annual intra- and inter-collegiate bouldering competitions as well as a collection of elite-level sport and trad climbers.	
