= Rod Trafford =

American football player (born 1978)

Rodney Trafford
No. 81
- Position: Tight end

Personal information
- Born: November 29, 1978 (age 47); Morristown, New Jersey, U.S.
- Listed height: 6 ft 3 in (1.91 m)
- Listed weight: 250 lb (113 kg)

Career information
- High school: Delbarton School (Morristown)
- College: South Carolina

Career history
- New England Patriots (2003)*; Scottish Claymores (2003); Buffalo Bills (2003–2004)*; Philadelphia Eagles (2004)*; Buffalo Bills (2004); St. Louis Rams (2006)*; New England Patriots (2006)*
- * Offseason or practice squad member only
- Stats at Pro Football Reference

Rodney Trafford (born November 29, 1978) is an American former professional football player who was a tight end in the National Football League (NFL).

Trafford grew up in Verona, New Jersey, and played his high school football at Delbarton School. Trafford was All State quarterback He played college football for the South Carolina Gamecocks under coach Lou Holtz.

Trafford played for the New England Patriots, Scottish Claymores, Buffalo Bills, Philadelphia Eagles, and St. Louis Rams.

== Early life ==
Trafford was in a car accident at 13 years old during a fishing trip. This led to the discovery of a hole in his heart as well as an irregular heartbeat. While it was repaired, he was not cleared for football. Trafford eventually found a doctor who allowed him to play as long as he wore a Kevlar body suit to support his sternum, and took regular medication and had regular checkups.

Trafford played quarterback at Delbarton School, throwing for more than 2,800 yards and 30 touchdown. His senior year, he played in the North-South New Jersey all-star game. His coach was John Kowalik.

== College career ==
Trafford earned three varsity letters at University of South Carolina and finished his career with seven receptions for 37 yards. Over his final two years, he led the Gamecocks to a 17–7 record as well as wins in the Outback Bowl following the 2000 and 2001 seasons. He was part of a reversal of fortunes for the University of South Carolina program, going from an 0–11 record as a sophomore to bowl wins as a junior and as a senior. He saw action in all 24 games as a junior and senior. He helped the University of South Carolina running game gain 2,378 yards in 2001, averaging 4.5 yards per carry. He joined the squad as a walk-on quarterback, but redshirted as a freshman in 1997 and was converted into a tight end.

== College statistics ==
University of South Carolina

Year	No.	Yds.	Avg.	TD	Long
1999	3	14	4.7	0	13
2000	2	16	8.0	0	10
2001	1	7	7.0	1	7
Totals	5	30	6.4	0	13

== Professional Career ==
Trafford was not drafted when he finished college in 2002. He was a camp director for 30 fourth-grade boys in Summit, N.J., did some sales work and research for his father's computer engineering firm, and also worked part-time for a publishing company.

Buffalo Bills signed Trafford to the practice squad on November 19, 2003. Trafford played for three months in the Scottish Claymores, a European League team, after being signed by the New England Patriots.

Trafford helped the Scottish Claymores record a narrow win over Amsterdam Admirals – with his first touchdown since college. Trafford's score kept the Claymores on target to reach next month's World Bowl Final.

Receiving/Rushing statistics

Year	Team	G	GS	Rec	Yds	Lg	TD	FD	Att	Yds	Avg	Lg	TD	FD
2003	Scottish (NFLE)	0	0	18	223	12.4	24	1	--	0	0	0.0	0	0

Passing statistics

Year	Team	G	GS	ATT	Cmp Pct	Yds	Avg	TD	TD%	Int%	Lg	Sack	Loss	Rate
2003	Scottish (NFLE)	--	–	1	0	0.0	0	0.00	0.0	0	0	0.0	0	39.6

Playing in NFL Europe led him to miss Patriots' training putting him behind the other rookies.

In 2004, he was signed by the Bills on Dec 8 after the team placed TE Mark Campbell on injured reserve, after being on Philadelphia Eagles’ practice squad for two weeks. He made his NFL debut four days later and caught his first career pass against Cleveland on December 12 of the same year.

Receiving/Rushing statistics

Year	Team	G	GS	Rec	Yds	Lg	TD	FD	Att	Yds	Avg	Lg	TD	FD
2004	Buffalo (NFL)	4	0	3	25	8.3	10	0	2	0	0	0.0	0	0

Receiving by games played

Date	vs Team	GP/GS	REC	YDS	Long	AVG	TD
12/12	CLE (NFL)	1/0	1	10	10.0	10	0
12/19	CIN (NFL)	1/0	0	0.0	0	0	0
12/26	SF (NFL)	1/0	1	5	5.0	5	0
1/2/05	PIT (NFL)	1/0	1	10	10.0	10	0
2004	Season (NFL)	4/0	3	25	8.3	10	0
Career	(NFL)	4/0	3	25	8.3	10	0

== Awards ==
Trafford earned All-State honors his senior year at Delbarton School.

== Personal life ==
In the early 2000s, Trafford worked at Xenith LLC as a Southeast Regional Sales Manager.

At Xenith LLC Rod Trafford raised concerns about the helmets players were wearing writing, "The players maybe aren't wearing the correct size helmet maybe they're not being fit properly. There could be some design flaws. [...] It seems the past two or three years, it's become an epidemic."

2009 Trafford made the cover of Delbarton School Today while at Xenith in an article "Defending the Brain."

2014 Trafford became a Master Trainer and Ambassador to teach and reinforce USA Football's Heads Up Football.

Trafford joined Pazoo.com January 12, 2015, as a Health and Wellness expert writing about sports safety.

2015 Trafford joined i1 Biometrics, Inc. as a Regional Sales Manager to help with the growing epidemic of undiagnosed sports brain injuries.
