= Delbarton School =

Private high school in Morris County, New Jersey, US

Location
- 230 Mendham Road; Morris Township, New Jersey 07960; United States; 40°47′16″N 74°31′48″W

Information
- Type: Private, day, college-prep
- Motto: Succisa virescit (cut down, it grows again)
- Religious affiliations: Roman Catholic, Benedictine
- Established: 1939
- Founder: Benedictine Monks
- NCES School ID: A9303601
- President: Jonathan Licari
- Headmaster: Michael Tidd
- Faculty: 83.4 FTEs
- Grades: 7–12
- Gender: All-boys
- Average class size: 11.8
- Student to teacher ratio: 7.7:1
- Campus size: 200 acres (81 ha)
- Colors: Green & white
- Athletics: 16 sports
- Athletics conference: Northwest Jersey Athletic Conference (general); North Jersey Super Football Conference (football)
- Team name: Green Wave
- Rivals: Seton Hall Prep
- Accreditation: Middle States Association of Colleges and Schools
- Publication: Delbarton Magazine
- Newspaper: The Courier
- Yearbook: Archway
- School fees: $500 (books)
- Tuition: $48,725 (2025–26)
- Website: delbarton.org

Delbarton School is a private, all-male Catholic college-preparatory school in Morristown, New Jersey, serving students in seventh through twelfth grades. It is independently directed by the Benedictine monks of St. Mary's Abbey in Morristown and is located in the Diocese of Paterson.

As of the 2023–24 school year, the school had an enrollment of 646 students and 83.4 classroom teachers (on an FTE basis), for a student–teacher ratio of 7.7:1. Delbarton's student body comprises students from more than eight New Jersey counties and 100 communities.

Delbarton is a member of the New Jersey Association of Independent Schools and has been accredited by the Middle States Association of Colleges and Schools Commission on Elementary and Secondary Schools since 1961.

The school offers financial aid to families who cannot afford the cost of tuition, and financial aid offers are considered independently of admission. Annual tuition is $48,725 for the 2025–26 school year. Delbarton is a host site for NJ Seeds' young scholars program where every summer academically qualified but economically disadvantaged students attend classes on the Delbarton campus.

== History ==
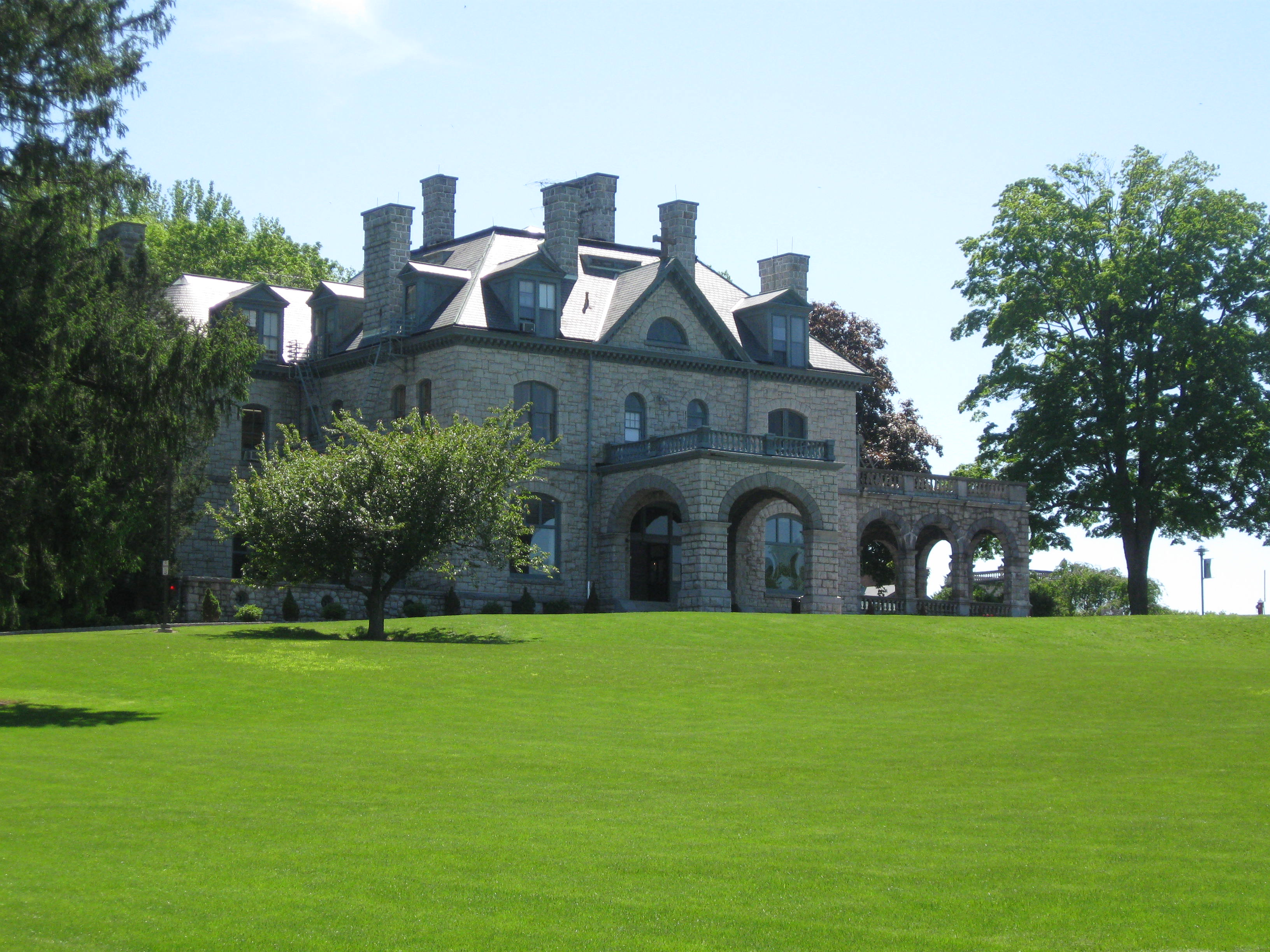
The Kountze Mansion, also known as "Old Main"

In the 1880s, Luther Kountze established an estate in northern New Jersey. He began to buy more land, eventually expanding his estate to cover 4,000 acres (1,600 ha). This eventually became the home of St. Mary's Abbey/Delbarton, Morristown National Historical Park and Lewis Morris County Park. Kountze eventually named the estate "Delbarton," borrowing one syllable from the names of each of his first three children (DELancey, BARclay and LivingsTON).

In 1918, Kountze died, leaving the entire property to his family. The family decided to put the estate for sale. In 1925, the monks of Saint Mary's Abbey, then in Newark, purchased approximately 400 acres (160 ha) of Delbarton to use as a separate house for younger members for studying, finally settling on the property in 1927.

After some time, the monks decided to open a secondary school, as the Newark residence had done so with Saint Benedict's Preparatory School. After some deliberation, Abbot Patrick O'Brien opened Delbarton School in 1939, appointing Father Augustine Wirth as the first headmaster. At that time, the school was a boarding school for sixth, seventh, and eighth grade students.

In 1942, Father Stephen Findlay succeeded as Headmaster and introduced drastic changes. The grade levels were modified, ultimately resulting in seventh through twelfth grades being offered. The Kountze carriage house was destroyed in a fire in 1947, leading to the construction of the St. Joseph Gymnasium. Because of the fire, the school chose as its motto, "Succisa Virescit" (“cut down, it grows again”), borrowing from the often destroyed Abbey of Monte Cassino in Italy. Trinity Hall opened in 1959, allowing the enrollment to increase to over 300. Father Stephen retired in 1967 to the position of Director of Development. In 1971, the Schmeil-O'Brien Hall dormitory was dedicated, although the majority of students were day students.

Delbarton's fourth headmaster, Father Gerard Lair (1975–1980), initiated more changes. The system of discipline from demerits and detention changed to a conversational program designed to bring about positive changes. As the academic prestige of the school grew, the board of trustees decided to terminate the residential program in 1978. The last two resident students graduated in 1983.

Since then, more facilities have been built, with the dedication of the Lynch Athletic Center in 1983, Findlay Science Pavilion in 1995, Fine Arts Center in 2006, the 40 Acres soccer and baseball fields in 2009, and the Cocoziello Field and Passerelli Track in 2010.

Molestation allegations against a monk at Delbarton resulted in lawsuits being filed against the school by two former students who claimed to have been inappropriately touched by the Reverend. In 2018, the school acknowledged that 13 priests or monks, and one lay faculty member had abused 30 individuals over a period of decades, resulting in at least 8 legal settlements with seven other cases still unresolved at that point.

In April 2021, Delbarton officially opened St. Benedict Hall, featuring a new library, Spada Commons, new office suite for guidance and college counseling and three new classrooms. The building also features the Hayes Room and connects with the first and second floor of Trinity Hall.

== International focus ==
Delbarton has made many efforts to open up the student body to the international community. Over the past few years many respectable speakers have spoken to the student body including Dith Pran and Lech Wałęsa.

Delbarton students also have several opportunities to travel abroad. The school participates in foreign exchange programs with schools in Ireland, particularly sister school Glenstal Abbey School in County Limerick, and the Bildungszentrum Markdorf School in Markdorf, Germany. Juniors can travel to the Caribbean during the summer between their junior and senior year to learn about the culture and history of select islands through the school's SOL program. Students also have the opportunity to experience eco-tourism first hand in Costa Rica. Students have visited nature reserves, Arenal Volcano, Poás Volcano National Park and Monteverde while studying at the CPI language school in Heredia, Costa Rica. Delbarton students have also traveled to Spain on several organized summer trips and to Germany for World Youth Day with the school's religious educator David Hajduk. The school has also sent several students to help assist in Operation Smile Missions in China, Honduras, Madagascar and Thailand. The most recent established trip overseas was a mission trip to Nairobi, Kenya, and Hanga, Tanzania, where students donated money and aid to several schools. The school's various musical ensembles also travel to foreign countries to tour and perform.

Students participate in the school's Model United Nations and Challenge 20/20 clubs. The Model United Nations club participates in four to five Model UN Conferences every year and has attained much success, winning the Best Small Delegation Award at Princeton's 2005 conference, the 2007 Seton Hall University conference, and 2009 WAMUNC. The club also participated in The Hague International Model United Nations, held in the Netherlands from 2006 to 2008.

== Academics ==
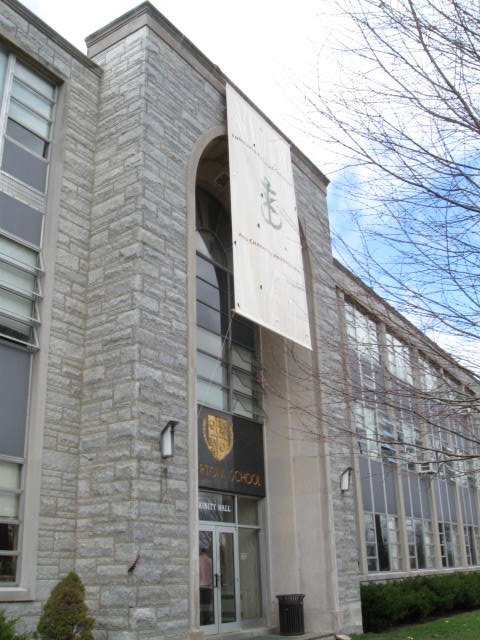
Trinity Hall, where most classes take place

Delbarton operates an 8:00 a.m. to 2:45 p.m. schedule, including six class periods, a conference period, and lunch. The schedule is an eight-day rotating block schedule ("A day" through "H day") with two classes dropping out of the schedule each of the eight days. All students have a twenty-five minute free period ("M block") from 10:00 to 10:25 AM. Teachers, guidance, and college counseling are available during M block and after school for extra assistance as needed. Although the school day ends at 2:45 p.m., the first buses do not leave campus until 4:00 p.m., which encourages students to pursue extracurricular activities, work with faculty on homework and special projects, and volunteer on one of the many community service projects the school sponsors. Late bus service is also offered at 6:00 p.m.

Delbarton offers 24 Advanced Placement courses. In 2009, 107 Delbarton students qualified as AP scholars, with 16 students qualifying for the National AP Scholar Award, 37 qualifying for the AP Scholar with Distinction Award, 26 qualifying for the AP Scholar with Honor Award, and 34 students qualifying for the AP Scholar Award. Delbarton does not offer any courses designated explicitly as "honors" because even classes not designated as "AP" are taught well beyond the traditional high school level. For example, students may take mathematics classes up to 3 years ahead of the nationwide standard (Algebra 1 in freshman year). Advanced math courses such as Linear Algebra, Multivariable Calculus, and AP Statistics are offered, as are independent study options. Language and literature courses are also offered in several languages.

With few exceptions, nearly all graduates continue on to four-year colleges or universities. Delbarton students are recognized for their academic achievements. In 2010, there were two National Merit Scholarships, three finalists, and 13 commended students. Eleven students were named Edward J. Bloustein Distinguished Scholars.

In 2007, The Wall Street Journal ranked Delbarton School ninth among America's high schools. For the 1983–1984 school year, Delbarton School received the National Blue Ribbon Award of Excellence from the United States Department of Education, the highest honor that an American school can achieve. In 2023, Niche.com ranked Delbarton third among Catholic high schools in the United States, and fifth among all private schools in New Jersey.

== Athletics ==
The Delbarton Green Wave competes in the Northwest Jersey Athletic Conference (NJAC), which is comprised of public and private high schools from Morris, Sussex and Warren counties, and was created following a reorganization of sports leagues in Northern New Jersey by the New Jersey State Interscholastic Athletic Association (NJSIAA). Before the NJSIAA's 2010 realignment, the school had competed in the Northern Hills Conference an athletic conference that included schools in Essex, Morris and Passaic counties. With 790 students in grades 10-12, the school was classified by the NJSIAA for the 2019–20 school year as Non-Public A for most athletic competition purposes, which included schools with an enrollment of 381 to 1,454 students in that grade range (equivalent to Group III for public schools). The football team competes in the United White division of the North Jersey Super Football Conference, which includes 112 schools competing in 20 divisions, making it the nation's biggest football-only high school sports league. The school was classified by the NJSIAA as Non-Public Group A (equivalent to Group III/IV/V for public schools) for football for 2024–2026, which included schools with 738 to 1,404 students.

=== Fall ===
Delbarton offers cross country, football and soccer as sports in the Fall season.

==== Football ====
Delbarton's football program has won state football championships in 1993 and 1998. The 1993 team finished the season 11-0 after winning the Group III Parochial title with a 24-23 victory over Saint Joseph Regional High School. in the championship game after coming back from a 14-0 deficit. The team won the 1998 title with a 21-3 victory over Immaculata High School.

From 1946 to 1987, Delbarton was coached by William Regan Sr., who compiled a 236-83-10 record with 33 winning seasons and 7 undefeated seasons.

From 1987 to 2002, Delbarton was coached by John Kowalik whose tenure included state titles in 1993 and 1998, state tournament playoff losses in 1997, 1999, and 2001 by fewer than six points in each game and five consecutive Northern Hills Conference championships for 1997, 1998, 1999, 2000, and 2001, finishing his career with a record of 138-29.

Since 2003, the coach has been Brian Bowers. During this time period, the team transitioned to the North Jersey Athletic Conference in 2009. Delbarton won NJAC championships in 2011, 2012, 2013, 2014 and 2015. Despite repeated objections based on being grouped with Bergen County football powers, the Green Wave joined the North Jersey Super Football Conference in 2016, playing in the White Division.

==== Soccer ====
The soccer team won the Non-Public B state championship in 1984 (defeating Mater Dei High School), 1985 (vs. Mater Dei), and won the Non-Public A state title in 1989 (as co-champion with Holy Cross Preparatory Academy), 1990 (vs. St. Joseph High School of Metuchen), 1996 (vs. Christian Brothers Academy), 1997 (vs. Notre Dame High School), 2003 (as co-champion with St. Augustine Preparatory School), 2004 (vs. Christian Brothers), 2012 (vs. Pingry School), 2013 (vs. Pingry), 2014 (vs. Notre Dame), 2015 (vs. Christian Brothers) and 2017 (vs. Christian Brothers); The program's 13 state titles are ranked third of all schools in the state and the streak of four titles won from 2012 to 2015 is tied for the state's third longest.

Delbarton has won six Morris County soccer championships and seven NJSIAA championships since 1995 under former All-American David Donovan. In 1997, under interim head coach Erin Sullivan, Delbarton won a triple crown - winning the Northern Hills Conference, Morris County Tournament and NJSIAA Parochial A state tournament. Again in 2003 and 2004, Delbarton won the triple crown, finishing second in The Star-Ledger state rankings in 2003 and first in 2004. In 2003, the team beat St. Benedict's Preparatory School of Newark, New Jersey, which was the number one team in the country and had not lost to a New Jersey team in 169 games over 12 years. In 2007, Delbarton's soccer team made it to the North Jersey Non-Public A final and had achieved a No. 4 ranking in the nation but lost by a 3-2 score to Seton Hall Preparatory School. Delbarton also earned a #2 ranking in the Non-Public A soccer group for the 2008 soccer season. The 2011 Delbarton soccer team won the Northwest Jersey Athletic Conference ("NJAC") regular season title as well as the NJSIAA Non-Public A North sectional championship and was ranked as high as #2 in the state.

The 2012 squad was undefeated/untied in winning the NJAC and also won both the inaugural Delbarton Invitational Tournament and the NJSIAA Non-Public A state championship, the latter with a 1-0 victory over the Pingry School on a last-minute goal. With a 23-1 record and the school's ninth state championship, Delbarton finished first in the final Star-Ledger state rankings. Matt Clausen and Greg Siefert were both 2012 Star-Ledger first team All-State selections.

The 2013 edition of Delbarton soccer followed the success of its predecessor with some historic feats of its own. The 2013 team suffocated its competition with defense, allowing only three goals all year and stamping its 22-1-1 record with 22 shutouts, including 18 in a row to close the season. Along the way, the Wave won the triple crown of conference, county and state championships and earned Delbarton both a second consecutive Star-Ledger #1 state ranking. The Star-Ledger named Coach Donovan its Coach of the Year and Mike Moshier as a first-team All-State selection.

In 2014, Delbarton once again took home the Non-Public A state championship, its third in a row, with a 3-0 win in the tournament final against Notre Dame High School.

In 2015, the soccer team won its fourth consecutive Non-Public A title with a 2-0 win against Christian Brothers Academy and finished the season top-ranked in the state by NJ.com.

In 2017, the team entered the season ranked number one in NJ.com Top 20 preseason rankings. The Green Wave went 21-0-1 overall, winning the Morris County Championship and its fifth state title in six years. Delbarton defeated Mendham 2-1 in the Morris County Tournament final on a goal by senior Will Stroud with 24 seconds left in the second half. In the state tournament, the Green Wave defeated Union Catholic (3-0), Pingry (1-0) and Seton Hall Prep (4-0) before defeating Christian Brothers Academy 4-1 to win the school's 13th overall and 11th Non-Public state championship. Delbarton finished the season No. 1 in the NJ.com Top 20 and were named Team of the Year.

==== Cross country ====
The cross country team competes in the NJAC in Non-Public A. Patrick Shellberg (2010) and Morgan Pearson (2011) made first team all state, and competed and won separate events at Penn Relays in 2010.

=== Winter ===
In the winter, Delbarton offers three major sports (sports with three separate team levels): Basketball, Ice Hockey, and Wrestling. In addition, five minor sports (sports with two or fewer levels of competition) compete under the Green Wave: Bowling, Indoor Track, Squash, Ski Team, and Swimming.

==== Basketball ====
Delbarton won the Morris County Tournament in 1989, 1990, 1992, 1994, 2003, 2006, 2022 and 2023; The program won its sixth MCT title after defeating Randolph High School by a score of 73-55 in the championship game. In 2023, the team repeated as champion and won its eighth MCT title with a 58-36 win against Madison High School in the finals.

==== Ice hockey ====
Delbarton won outright state championships in 1992, 2002, 2006, 2008-2013, 2016-2018, and was the state co-champion in 1989. Delbarton won Morris County's Mennen Cup championship 18 times over a 21-year span from 1984 to 2004. The hockey program then left the Morris County league to compete in the state's top league, the Gordon Conference, beginning with the 2004–2005 school year. The team won the Gordon Cup championship in its first season.

Delbarton's chief rival is Seton Hall Prep. At the height of the teams' rivalry, regular-season games between the two regularly drew more than 1,000 fans, and a regular season game in 2000 filled all 2,500 seats at the Mennen Arena. In 2006, Delbarton defeated previously undefeated Seton Hall Prep to win the New Jersey State Interscholastic Athletic Association (NJSIAA) non-public state championship.

Delbarton won the state championship in 2008 by defeating St. Augustine Prep 5-1. It was Delbarton's fourth outright state championship and fifth overall, and the Green Wave set a state record with 27 wins, finishing the season 27-1-1. In 2009, Delbarton repeated with another 27-win season that included victories over Massachusetts state champion Catholic Memorial, Hotchkiss (CT), and Christian Brothers Academy in the state final. Delbarton finished the season ranked No. 1 in the Northeast by Hockey Night in Boston.

Beginning in 2008, Delbarton, led by head coach Bruce Shatel, won six straight NJSIAA Non-Public State Titles: 2008, 2009, 2010, 2011, 2012, and 2013. In 2013, Delbarton defeated Don Bosco Preparatory High School 4-0 at the Prudential Center in Newark in the Non-Public State Final.

On February 1, 2014, as part of the NHL Stadium Series, Delbarton defeated Catholic Memorial School 3-0 in an outdoor game held at Yankee Stadium.

The Green Wave have won 11 straight Gordon Conference championships, 2007-2017 since moving to Gordon Conference.

In 2016, Delbarton defeated CBA 3-1 at the Prudential Center in Newark in the Non-Public State Final and repeated as NJSIAA Non-Public State Champions in 2017, defeating Don Bosco Preparatory High School 2-1 at Mennen Arena. The Green Wave finished the season with a 27-1-2 record and named NJ.com Team of the Year.

In 2018, Delbarton defeated Don Bosco 4-2 at the Prudential Center in Newark in the Non-Public State Final, taking home their third straight non-public title. The Green Wave also defeated Don Bosco Prep in the Gordon Cup Final 2-1 at Codey Arena in West Orange, New Jersey.

Delbarton plays its home games at the Aspen Ice Arena in Randolph, New Jersey following years of early morning winter practices at the outdoor Essex Hunt Club (Peapack) and the more local (and enclosed) Mennen Arena in Morristown.

Notable Delbarton players who went on to play in the NHL include George Parros (1998), 2007 Stanley Cup Champion with Anaheim Ducks, and Kenny Agostino (2010), who formerly played for various NHL teams and now plays in the KHL.

==== Wrestling ====
In 2002, Antonio Mangione captured the first individual state championship in school history (he later went on to win the state tournament a second time). In 2006, Delbarton's Mike Grey became the first four-time New Jersey state champion in the sport of wrestling. In 2006, and 2007, Delbarton's Frank Perrelli and Trevor Melde respectively won state championships, extending Delbarton's championship run to a total of six years and eight individual state titles. In 2008, Delbarton won its first Northern Hills Conference Championship in wrestling. In 2009, Delbarton wrestling won the Morris County tournament for the second time in school history, the Northern Hills Conference, and the District IX tournament. That year, they also finished 20th in the state with an 18-2 record. In 2011, Delbarton won its first North Non-Public A sectional championship by defeating Bergen Catholic High School and took the state Group Non-Public A championship by defeating Bishop Ahr High School to finish the season with a 13-1 record and was ranked fifth in the state. In 2013, led by Coaches Bryan Stoll and Guy Russo the Delbarton wrestling team captured its fifth consecutive Morris County tournament title, crowning four individual titles.

In 2020, Delbarton wrestling defeated Bergen Catholic High School in the Non-Public A North Semifinal en-route to a Non-Public A North title with a win over Saint Joseph Regional High School of Montvale. Delbarton defeated St. Augustine Preparatory School by 54-7 in the Non-Public A championship, bringing home a state title for the first time since 2011. In March 2020 senior Anthony Clark and Sophomore PJ Casale won individual state championships. This was Clark's third title and fourth appearance in the final. Casale won his first state individual title. Delbarton sent a record 13 wrestlers to Boardwalk Hall and had four wrestlers in the finals, ending with two first place finishes, two second place, three third place, one fourth and one fifth place finisher. The Green Wave were named NJ.com team of the year.

Joe Tavoso '15, Ty Agaisse '16, and Patrick Glory '18 all won individual state championships, all three later wrestling at Princeton.

==== Swimming ====
Under the direction of Kent Manno, Delbarton was crowned champions of the Morris County Tournament for an unprecedented 10 consecutive years, from 1983 to 1993.

In 2009, Delbarton captured its seventh straight Northern Hills Conference title. Also in 2009, Delbarton placed third in Division A of the NJSIAA Prep state championships and fourth at the Morris County Championships.

In 2016, Delbarton entered the NJ.com Top 20 swimming rankings at No. 17 after an upset victory over 12th-ranked St. Peter's Preparatory School. The 2015-16 team sent seven swimmers to the NJSIAA Meet of Champions.

==== Indoor track ====
In 2009, Delbarton tied for third overall at the NHC Championships, behind West Orange and Passaic Tech. Delbarton also sent relay teams to the Nike Indoor Nationals in 2009 in both distance and sprinting events. On January 29, 2010, Pat Schellberg won the boys' mile at the 103rd Millrose Games with a time of 4:14.84.

==== Squash ====
Delbarton has Junior Varsity and Varsity squash teams, which compete with other schools in the Tri-State area. The Varsity team also competes in certain national events, such as the National High School Championships at Yale University. In 2011, Delbarton won the U.S. High School Team Squash Championships for Division V with a 4-3 win in the tournament final against St. George's School (Rhode Island).

In 2019, Delbarton won the U.S. High School Team Squash Championships for Division VII with a 4-3 win in the tournament final against Canisius High School.

==== Ski team ====
The 2010-11 winter season saw the introduction of a Ski Team. The Ski Team races against eighteen other public and private high schools mostly from northwest NJ. The Ski Team trains, races and competes at Mountain Creek in Vernon Township, New Jersey. In its inaugural year the team finished third of eight in the Freedom League, made the team state finals, and finished ninth in the state. After only one season with competitive racers, though, the team finished the unseasonably warm 2011–2012 season ranked third in the league and fourth overall in the state. In the 2013–2014 season, Delbarton's Ski Team was ranked number one in New Jersey. They won their first state championship and finished first in the Freedom League.

=== Spring ===
During the Spring season, Baseball, Lacrosse, Tennis, Golf and Track & Field are the sports offered to the students.

==== Baseball ====
The baseball team won the Non-Public A state championship in 1996 (defeating Camden Catholic High School in the tournament final), 2002 (vs. Christian Brothers Academy), 2017 (vs. St. Augustine Preparatory School) and 2019 (vs. St. Augustine).

The team has won the Morris County Tournament six times, tied for the second-most in tournament history, winning in 1970, 1987, 2008, 2012, 2017 and 2019. The team won its fifth Morris County Tournament title in 2017, defeating Randolph High School by a 6-5 score in extra innings in the final.

Brian Fleury was director of athletics, head varsity baseball coach and an English teacher at Delbarton. In his ten years as Delbarton's head baseball coach, his teams compiled a record of 223-63 and won nine Northern Hills Conference championships plus NJSIAA state championships in 2002 and 2006, before his death in October 2007.

The 1996 team finished the season with a 25-4 record after winning the Parochial A title with an 8-3 win against Camden Catholic in the championship game.

Under Coach Bruce Shatel, Delbarton won the Non-Public A state championship in 2017 with a 2-1 victory in the final of the tournament against St. Augustine Preparatory School. NJ.com named Delbarton as its "Team of the Year" based on its victories in conference, county and state competition. In 2019, the baseball team went 26-3, winning the Morris County title defeating West Morris Central High School 2-1, earning the program's sixth MCT title, tied for second most in tournament history. In the Non-Public A State Championship, Delbarton defeated St. Augustine Preparatory School 4-3 to capture their fourth state championship. Anthony Volpe earned 2018-19 NJ Player of the Year honors while NJ.com named Delbarton its "Team of the Year." Shortstop Anthony Volpe was drafted 30th overall by the New York Yankees in the 2019 MLB draft and signed with the team later that month.

==== Lacrosse ====
Under the guidance of 1979 alumnus Chuck Ruebling, Delbarton had one of the best lacrosse team in New Jersey from 1999 to 2006, having won five straight overall state championships / Tournament of Champions titles in the years 2002-2006 and seven out of eight years. The team won the overall state championship in 1999 (vs. Hunterdon Central Regional High School), 2000 (vs. Ridgewood High School), 2002 (vs. Ridgewood) and 2003 (vs. Mountain Lakes High School), and won the Non-Public Group A title in 2006 (vs. Bergen Catholic High School), 2007 (vs. Christian Brothers Academy), 2008 (vs. Bergen Catholic), 2009 (vs. St. Joseph High School of Metuchen), 2011 (vs. St. Augustine Preparatory School), 2012 (vs. Don Bosco Preparatory High School), 2013 (vs. Seton Hall Preparatory School), 2014 (vs. Bergen Catholic), 2016 (vs. Bergen Catholic), 2017 (vs. Seton Hall), 2018 (vs. Seton Hall) and 2019 (vs. Don Bosco). The team won the Tournament of Champions in 2004 (defeating runner-up Mountain Lakes), 2005 (vs. Summit High School), 2006 (vs. Mountain Lakes), 2014 (vs. Summit), 2016 (vs. Pingry School), 2017 (vs. Moorestown High School) and 2018 (vs. Summit). The seven Tournament of Champion wins (starting in 2004), the 16 group titles and the streak of eight consecutive group titles from 2002 to 2009 are all the most of any team in the state.

Down 2-0 early in the 2000 state championship game, the team scored five straight goals to pull ahead and win by a score of 6-4 against Ridgewood and finish the season with a record of 18-4.

In 2007, the Delbarton lacrosse team was ranked fifth in the nation by STX/Inside Lacrosse. Delbarton's lacrosse team was ranked fifth in the nation in 2007 by the LaxPower.com National High School Coaches Poll. The 2007 team won the Non-Public A state championship with a 14-5 win over Christian Brothers Academy.

They lost in the Tournament of Champions in 2009 to Summit by a score of 8-4.

Delbarton returned to the top of New Jersey lacrosse after eight years in 2014, capturing its fourth TOC state title with a win over Summit High School by a final score of 7-5.

Delbarton won its third consecutive TOC title in 2018, defeating Summit 12-6. The team ended the season ranked #1 in the Nation by both Laxpower.com and Maxpreps and #2 in the Nation by both Under Armour and USA Today.

==== Tennis ====
The tennis team won the Non-Public B&C state title in 1985-1988 (defeating Gloucester Catholic High School each of the four years), and won the Non-Public B championship in 1996 (vs. Christian Brothers Academy), 1998 (vs. Donovan Catholic High School), 2001 (vs. Christian Brothers), 2003 (vs. St. Augustine Preparatory School), 2004 (vs. Christian Brothers), 2005 (vs. St. Augustine), 2006 (vs. At. Augustine), 2008 (vs. St. Augustine), 2009 (vs. St. Augustine), 2010 (vs. Christian Brothers), 2011 (vs. St. Augustine), 2012 (vs. Christian Brothers), 2015 (vs. Notre Dame High School), 2016 (vs. Notre Dame), 2017 (vs. Christian Brothers), 2018 (vs. Christian Brothers) and 2019 (vs. St. Augustine); the program's 21 state titles are fourth most in the state. The team won the 1987 parochial state championship in 1987 (defeating St. Joseph High School of Metuchen). In 2008, the team won the Tournament of Champions against runner-up Westfield High School.

Delbarton's tennis program has won nine of the last ten Morris County Tournaments and six consecutive state group titles, finishing second in the state in 2006. The 2006 tennis team won the 2006 Group A state championship with a 5-0 win over St. Augustine College Preparatory School.

The tennis team won the 2007 Non-Public, North A state sectional championship with a 3-2 win over Pingry School.

In 2008, the tennis team won the Non-Public, North A state sectional championship with a 4-1 win over Pingry School. It went on to defeat Westfield High School, 3-2, to win its first ever Tournament of Champions title.

In 2019, Delbarton Tennis won the Morris County Tournament for the 17th time in 18 years. They went on to defeat St. Augustine 3-2 to win their fifth straight Non-Public A title. In the Tournament of Champions, Delbarton defeated Highland Park High School 5-0 before losing to Newark Academy 4-1 in the semifinals.

==== Golf ====
Delbarton's golf program is consistently one of the top squads in Morris County and in New Jersey. Playing their home matches at Somerset Hills Country Club, the team is coached by Sean Flanagan. In 1999 and 2000, Delbarton won back-to-back state titles. In 2010, the Green Wave ended the season with a 17-0 record, having won the North Jersey, Non-Public A sectional, as well as the Non-Public Group A state title, Morris County Tournament, the Northwest Jersey Conference Tournament and the conference crown. The team ranked second in the state. Coach Flanagan was named the Star-Ledger's 2010 Coach of the Year. Delbarton has also had two individual state champions: Will Voetsch in 2015 and Tyler Lee in 2023.

==== Track ====
On April 23, 2010, at the 116th Penn Relays, Pat Schellberg won the high school boys' one mile (1.6 km) run championship and broke the track meet's event record. His time of 4:08.13 was also the fastest recorded mile run by any boy in the U.S. that year (2010). The following year, Morgan Pearson won the boys' 3,000 meter run in the Penn Relays with a time of 8:22. Dean Sullivan won the boys' javelin throw at New Balance Outdoor Nationals in 2011 with a throw of 217 feet 9 inches (66.37 m).

==== Rugby club ====
Delbarton is also one of the few schools in the area with a Rugby Club.

In 2010, Coach Tom Feury, founder of Morris Youth Rugby, and Coach Bob Karetsky, who coached Harvard Rugby for several years, led Delbarton's Rugby Club to a 13-1 record in the Green Wave club's second season. The team's only loss was to Morris Rugby, a team that was founded in 1977 comprised of several players with more than four years experience. In the team's 11-0 dual schedule (one forfeit), the offense scored 402 points, and the defense only let up 60. The Delbarton Rugby Club won New Jersey's inaugural rugby state championship title, defeating St. Peter's Preparatory School by a score of 43-3 in May 2012.

The club went undefeated throughout the 2015 season, outscoring its opponents 246-32, and defeating St. Augustine Preparatory School by a score of 33-21 in the single-school state championship. The team, which had multiple players nominated to the New Jersey All-State team, was also later ranked 42nd in the nation.

In 2019, Rugby was officially added as the sixth varsity spring sport offered at Delbarton. In their first year as an official varsity sport, Delbarton went 4-3, losing to St. Augustine 17-12 in the state final.

== Arts programs ==
Delbarton's Abbey Players produce three theatrical productions yearly: a fall play, a winter musical and a spring 'One Act' production featuring student written and directed plays. The productions attract participants from neighboring schools.

Delbarton has a range of instrumental ensembles, including a Wind Ensemble, Jazz Band, Abbey Orchestra, and Percussion Ensemble.

There are several a cappella and vocal ensembles. The group Schola Cantorum, commonly referred to as 'Schola,' is Delbarton's flagship chorus and features about 40 Delbarton students of all grades. Schola was founded by Dr. Roy Horton. The group performs all year in school concerts and at school masses. Schola Cantorum has performed across the United States and Europe. During the Summer of 2007 the Delbarton Schola Cantorum performed throughout Italy and in a Vatican mass service. Schola has also toured England, Ireland, and Scotland. The Benedictones is an a cappella group focusing primarily on pop classics and barbershop songs and is led by Mr. David Blazier, who inspired the group's formation in 2005. Gothicappella is led by Rev. Carol Horton and focuses primarily on music written before 1500. Gothicappella selections include plainsong and Gregorian chant, as well as other lesser-known songs.

On October 19, 2006, Delbarton officially opened its Fine Arts Center, which was constructed at a cost of $20 million. The arts and music departments were formerly housed in the school's historic "Old Main" building. The new 36,000 sq ft (3,300 m^{2}) building includes a 622-person theater, several art studios, and rehearsal spaces for Delbarton's many musical groups. The school broke ground on the site during the Summer of 2005. After-school music lessons (voice lessons, various instruments) are also offered in the facility.

The Abbey Church also houses a pipe organ which was rebuilt in 2012. The space is known for its acoustic qualities.

== Abbey Woods ==
After a six-year battle between state officials and the Monks at Delbarton School, as well as $2 million in legal fees, a decision was made on July 26, 2006, that the request for a sewer extension to the proposed $100 million Abbey Woods development, a continuing-care retirement community, would not be allowed. Environmentalists and several Morris Township residents had been working against the project that would develop 71 acres (290,000 m^{2}) of zoned land adjacent to the Jockey Hollow Park. Rev. Elias R. Lorenzo commented in The Star-Ledger that "If the development is not passed, we will sell the land to other developers". In 2009, Delbarton sold 188 acres (0.76 km^{2}) of the Abbey Woods to The Trust for Public Land for $13.75 million. While the acquisition was primarily handled by the Trust, ownership will mostly be held by the Morris County Park Commission, with Morris Township receiving 10 acres (40,000 m^{2}).

== Sexual abuse allegations ==
In 2012, various media outlets reported news of sexual misconduct by several monks from Saint Mary's Abbey who also worked at Delbarton School. Six former students accused several monks of sexual abuse in the 1970s and 1980s.

== Headmasters ==
- Rev. Augustine F. Wirth, O.S.B. (1939–1942)
- Rev. Stephen W. Findlay, O.S.B. (1942–1967)
- Rev. Francis D. O'Connell, O.S.B. (1967–1971)
- Rev. James A. O'Donnel, O.S.B. (1971–1975)
- Rev. Gerard P. Lair, O.S.B. (1975–1980)
- Rt. Rev. Giles P. Hayes, O.S.B. (1980–1985)
- Rev. Bruno A. Ugliano, O.S.B. (1985–1990)
- Rev. Beatus T. Lucey, O.S.B. (1990–1995)
- Rev. John Hesketh, O.S.B. (1995)
- Rt. Rev. Giles P. Hayes, O.S.B. (1996–1999)
- Rev. Luke L. Travers, O.S.B. (1999–2007)
- Very Ven. Paul Diveny, O.S.B. (2007–2018)
- Fr. Michael Tidd, O.S.B. (2018-)

== Notable alumni ==
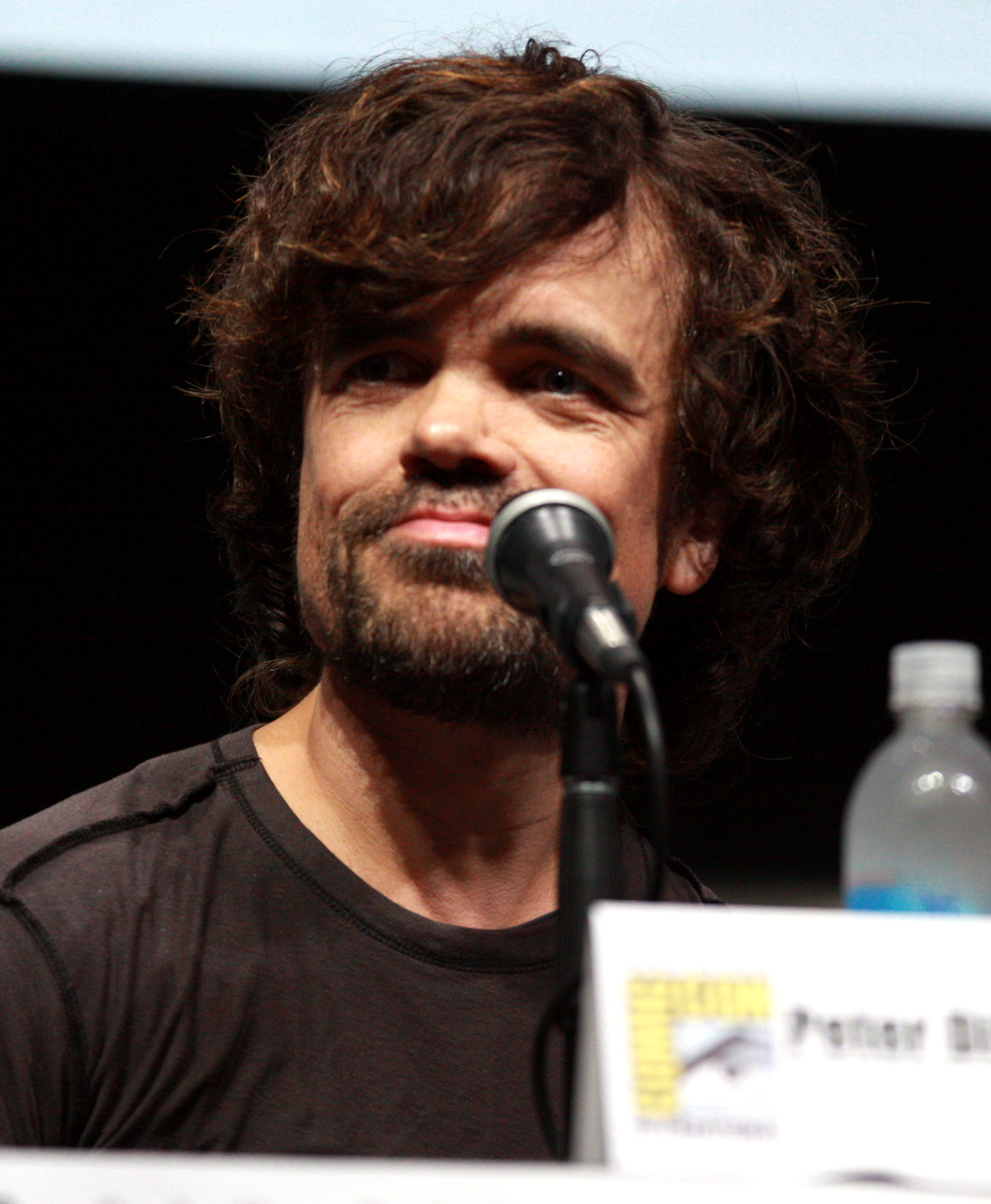
Peter Dinklage

- Kenny Agostino (born 1992, class of 2010), professional hockey player with the Toronto Maple Leafs
- Jack Alexy (born 2003), competitive swimmer, 2024 Olympic gold medalist
- Kary Antholis (born 1962, class of 1980), President for Miniseries at HBO and Academy Award Winner
- William Antholis (born 1965, class of 1982), director and CEO, Miller Center, University of Virginia, former Brookings Institution managing director
- Darryl M. Bell (born 1963), actor
- Stephen Bienko (born 1979), entrepreneur behind the College Hunks Hauling Junk brand
- Michael Patrick Carroll (born 1958), member of the New Jersey General Assembly who served from 1996 to 2020
- John Cholish (born 1983), mixed martial artist who competes in the lightweight division of the Ultimate Fighting Championship
- Dan Cocoziello (born 1985), professional lacrosse player
- Steve Conine (born 1972/1973, class of 1991), co-founder and co-chairman of Wayfair
- Ned Crotty (born 1986, class of 2005), Tewaaraton Award winner and professional lacrosse player
- Peter Dinklage (born 1969), actor and Emmy and Golden Globe Winner
- Christopher Durang (born 1949), playwright
- John Farinacci (born 2001), ice hockey forward for the Providence Bruins of the American Hockey League
- Mike Ferguson (born 1970), former United States congressman
- Alex Hewit (born 1985), retired lacrosse goaltender who played for the New Jersey Pride
- Deep Katdare (born 1970), financer and former actor
- Bernard Kenny (born 1946), politician, who represented the 33rd Legislative District in the New Jersey Senate from 1993 to 2008
- Jack Leiter (born 2000, class of 2019) pitcher for Vanderbilt University, threw a no-hitter on March 20, 2021 for Vanderbilt against South Carolina
- Brendan McSorley (born 2002), professional soccer player who plays for MLS Next Pro club St. Louis City 2
- Robert Tappan Morris (born 1965, class of 1983), computer scientist who created the first internet worm
- Troy Murphy (born 1980), retired professional basketball player
- Bill Murray (born 1997), defensive tackle for the New England Patriots
- George Parros (born 1979), retired professional hockey player and member of the 2006-2007 Anaheim Ducks Stanley Cup championship team
- Morgan Pearson (born 1993, class of 2011), professional triathlete who won a silver medal in the mixed relay event at the 2020 Summer Olympics
- PES (born 1973 as Adam Pesapane), Oscar and Emmy-nominated director and stop-motion animator, whose short film Fresh Guacamole was nominated for the Academy Award for Best Animated Short Film in 2013
- Teddy Schneider (born 1988), soccer player for the New York Red Bulls
- Reade Seligmann, one of the three lacrosse players charged and later exonerated in the 2006 Duke University lacrosse case
- Jared Stroud (born 1996), footballer who plays as a midfielder for New York Red Bulls II in the United Soccer League
- Rod Trafford (born 1978), former professional football player (Buffalo Bills)
- Anthony Volpe (born 2001, class of 2019), first round, 30th overall 2019 MLB draft pick by the New York Yankees.
- Dave Weinstein (born 1988), appointed by Governor of New Jersey Chris Christie in 2016 to serve as the state's first Chief Technology Officer
- Brett Yormark (born 1966), commissioner of the Big 12 Conference, former CEO of Roc Nation, the New York Islanders and New Jersey Nets.
- Michael Zheng (born 2004), professional tennis player who won the boys state singles title in 2021
