= Gordon Cup =

The Gordon Cup is an annual conference tournament held within the Gordon Conference in New Jersey Ice Hockey League. The inaugural Gordon Cup tournament took place in 1959, with Livingston winning the championship. The Cup recently celebrated its 50th anniversary.

Bergen Catholic, Bishop Eustace Prep, Christian Brothers Academy, Delbarton, and Seton Hall Prep participate in the Gordon Conference American Division. Don Bosco Prep, Gloucester Catholic, Pope John, St. Augustine Prep, and St. Peters Prep take part in the Gordon Conference National Division.

== Gordon Cup Championship ==
Gordon Cup Championships 1997-2010
Season	Champion	Runner up	Score
1996–1997	Seton Hall Prep	St. Joe's Montvale	3-2
1997–1998	Seton Hall Prep	St. Joe's Montvale	6-0
1998–1999	Brick	Seton Hall Prep	2-1
1999–2000	Seton Hall Prep	Brick	5-2
2000–2001	Seton Hall Prep	Bergen Catholic	7-0
2001–2002	Seton Hall Prep	St. John Vianney	5-2
2002–2003	Bergen Catholic	Seton Hall Prep	6-4
2003–2004	Bergen Catholic	Seton Hall Prep	4-2
2004–2005	Delbarton	Christian Brothers Academy	6-4
2005–2006	Seton Hall Prep	Delbarton	5-2
2006–2007	Christian Brothers Academy	Delbarton	1-0
2007–2008	Delbarton	St. Augustine Prep	5-3
2008–2009	Delbarton	Bishop Eustace	5-1
2009–2010	Christian Brothers Academy	St. Augustine Prep	7-0
2010–2011	Delbarton, St. Augustine Prep (co-champions)		2-2
2011-2012	Delbarton	Don Bosco Prep	4-1
2012-2013	Christian Brothers Academy	Delbarton	5-2
2019-2020	Christian Brothers Academy	Don Bosco Prep	2-0
