= Throat guard =

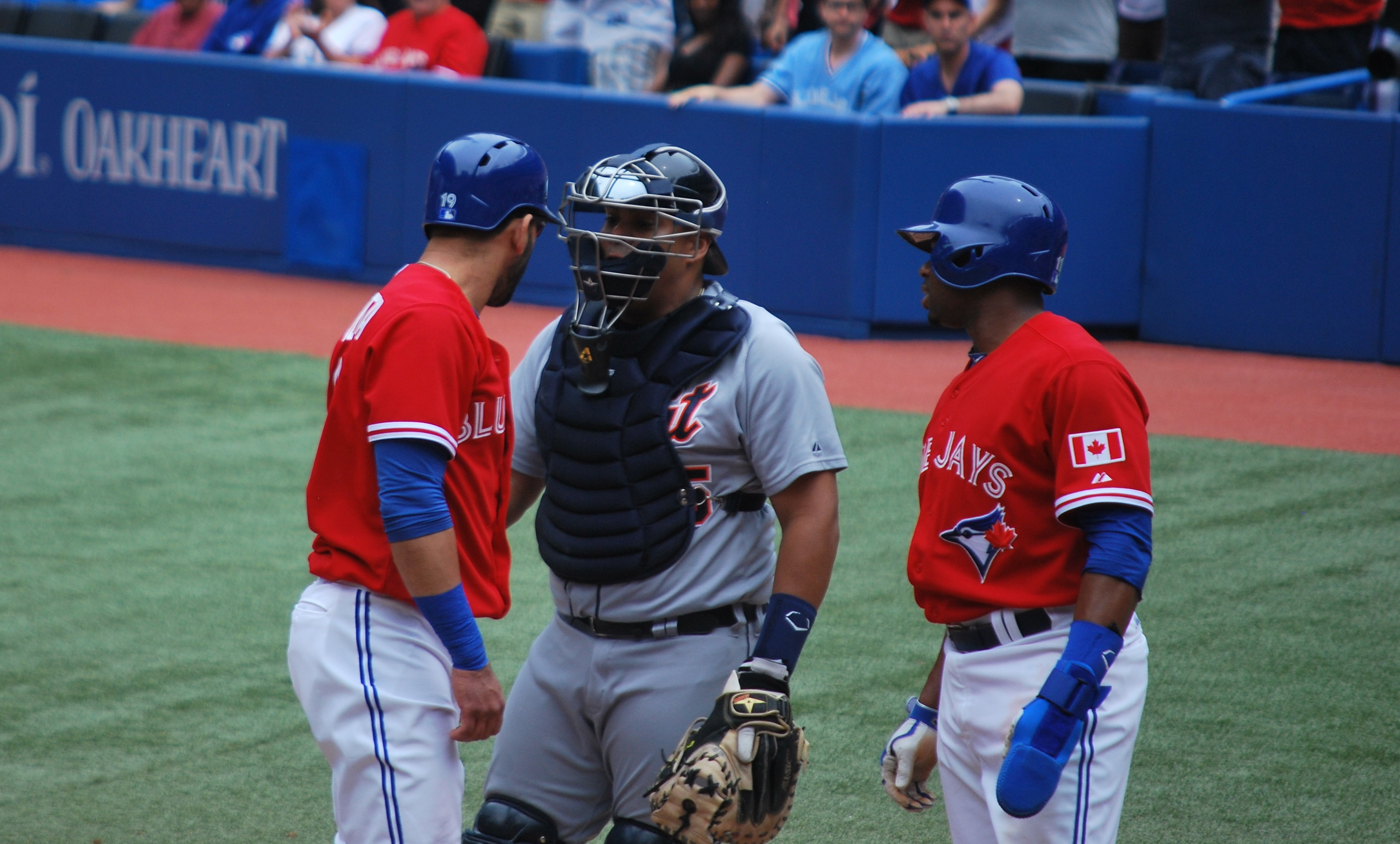
Tigers catcher Brayan Pena wearing a throat guard

A throat guard is a piece of protective equipment worn in various sports, including baseball, ice hockey, and lacrosse. Throat guards can be made of metal, leather, and/or plastic, and may be built in to a mask or attached separately.

The guard was invented in 1976 by Los Angeles Dodgers trainer Bill Buhler after catcher Steve Yeager was impaled in the throat by pieces of a broken bat. It was designed to hang from the bottom of the catcher's mask and protect against foul balls. This guard was compared to a goat's beard.

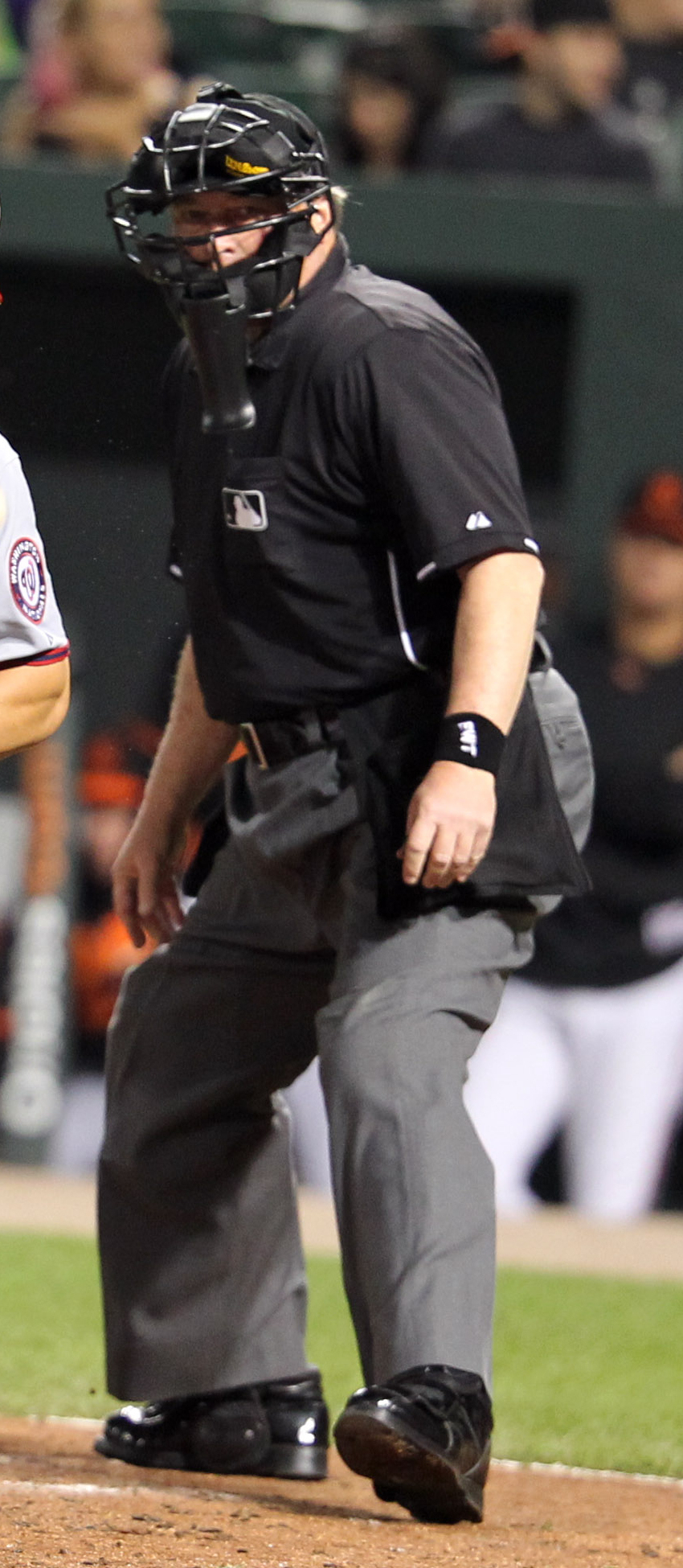
Former Major League Baseball umpire Gerry Davis wearing a throat guard

The guard is now required in numerous youth and amateur baseball leagues, including Little League. The NCAA requires it for baseball and softball. Numerous umpires across the world opt to use the guard as well.
