= Dartmouth Big Green men's lacrosse =

- Founded: 1926
- University: Dartmouth College
- Head coach: Sean Kirwan (2023-Present season)
- Stadium: Scully–Fahey Field (capacity: 1,600)
- Location: Hanover, New Hampshire
- Conference: Ivy League
- Nickname: Big Green
- Colors: Dartmouth green and white

NCAA Tournament appearances
- (1) - 2003

Conference regular season championships
- (3) - 1964, 1965, 2003

The Dartmouth Big Green men's lacrosse team represents Dartmouth College in NCAA Division I men's lacrosse. Dartmouth competes as a member of the Ivy League and plays its home games at Scully–Fahey Field in Hanover, New Hampshire. Dartmouth fielded its first lacrosse team in 1926.

== History ==
=== Tom Dent era ===
Head Coach Tom Dent led the team for its first 35 seasons until his retirement in 1960. Recruited to Dartmouth to coach soccer, he took on the task of coaching the first lacrosse team although he had no experience in the latter sport. Through the 1940s the Indians were considered a lacrosse "power" as they rolled up nine New England championships in 11 years. Dent's overall lacrosse record for 35 years is 188 wins, 141 losses, and 4 ties.

A successful coach in terms of winning, Coach Dent was also concerned with the characters of his charges. The Dartmouth lacrosse team bestows an annual award in Tom Dent's memory, and it is "To be awarded to the Senior player who by vote of the entire team, has demonstrated the ideals of Tom Dent through his aggressive play, his proven ability as a team player, and his enjoyment of the game, and who by his sportsmanlike conduct is a credit to the memory of Tom Dent and to Dartmouth."

=== 1961–2014 ===
The Big Green secured the Ivy League championship in 1964, 1965, and 2003. This was determined by the Ivy League conference records until the inception of a conference tournament in 2010.

Dartmouth named Rick Sowell as its head coach in 1999, the first African-American Head Coach in Division I lacrosse. He would lead the Big Green for the next 5 seasons, overseeing a turn-around in the program's fortunes.

In 2003, the Big Green posted one of the biggest upsets in lacrosse history when unranked Dartmouth played #2 Princeton at Princeton's Class of 1952 Field on April 26. Dartmouth, having finished last in the Ivy League in 2002, played on the road versus the defending champs. Nevertheless, Dartmouth prevailed by stunning the Tigers 13-6. Dartmouth went on to win the Ivy League title and qualify for the NCAA tournament.

Dartmouth made its first appearance in the NCAA tournament in 2003, where it was eliminated in the first round by Syracuse, 13–11. The game was highlighted by the end-to-end game-tying goal scored by the Dartmouth goalie, Andrew Goldstein. Sowell left for St. John's University at the conclusion of the 2003 season.

Bill Wilson replaced Sowell for the 2004 season. "During his tenure with the Big Green, (Wilson) compiled a 40-44 overall record, while coaching nine first-team all-league players, one Ivy League Rookie of the Year, 18 first-team All-New England players and seven players selected in the Major League Lacrosse Draft. Signature wins for Dartmouth during Wilson's six-year stint include an upset of fourth-ranked Maryland in 2005, a pair of victories of top-10 ranked Notre Dame and a win over 10th-ranked league rival Princeton in 2008."

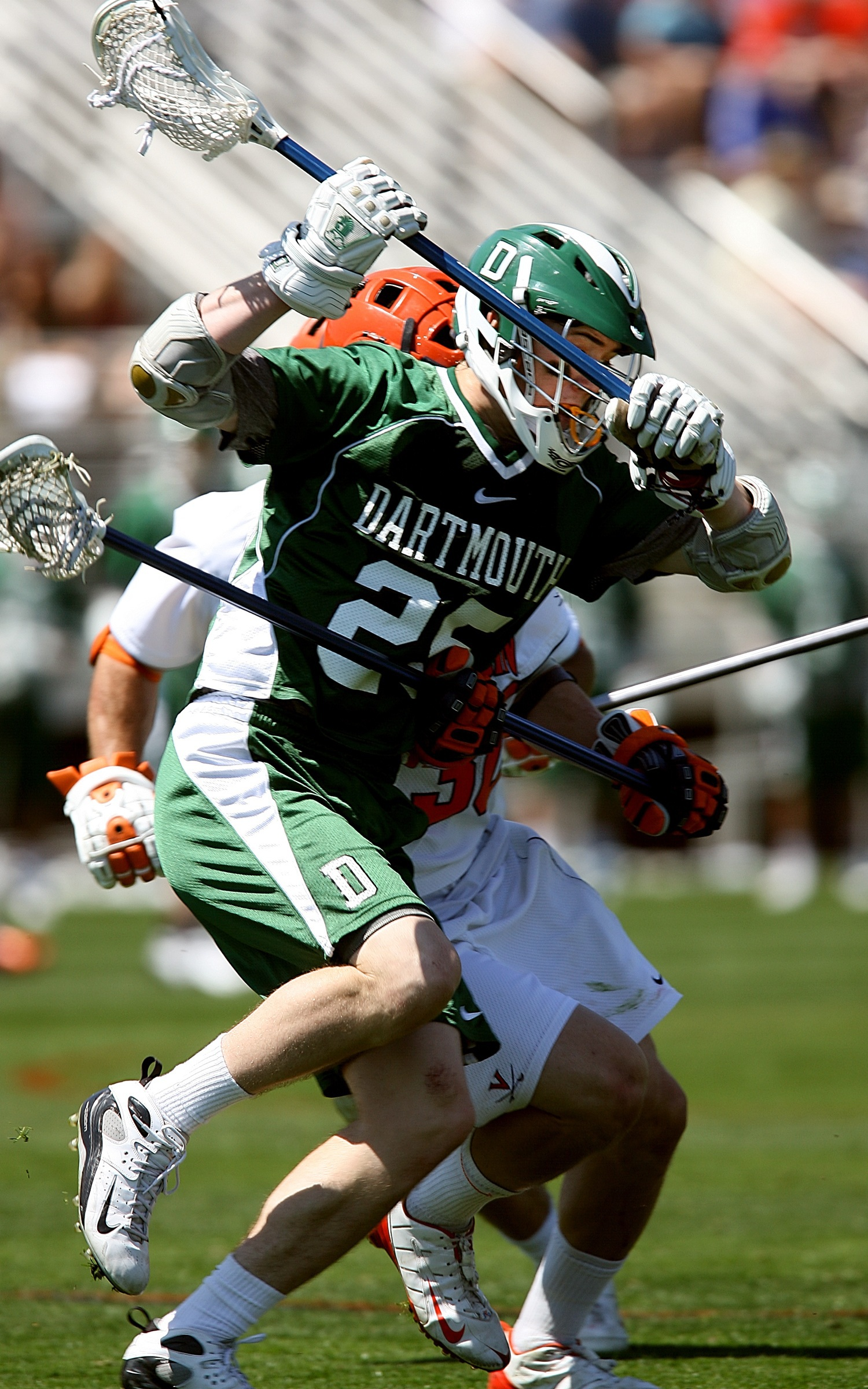
A game between Dartmouth and Virginia in 2009

Andy Towers became the Big Green's ninth Head Coach in 2010. Towers had been an assistant Dartmouth coach for the preceding 5 seasons. In 2013, Dartmouth Men's lacrosse posted another stunning upset against then #9 Princeton, beating them 10-9 at Scully-Fahey field on March 13. As reported in College Crosse:

Entering that game, the Big Green were just 2-8, suffering through a six-game losing streak (against some admittedly strong competition). Yet, Dartmouth pulled off one of the biggest upsets of the season, dropping Princeton -- ranked ninth in the media poll and eighth in the coaches poll going into the game -- in impressive fashion: Down 7-5 at the half, the Big Green used a three-goal run over the final 6:43 of the third quarter and the first 5:49 of the fourth quarter to draw even with the Tigers at eight; then, after falling behind 8-9 following a Jake Froccaro goal with just over seven minutes remaining in regulation, Dartmouth ripped off two goals in the latter stages of the final period to pull out the improbable victory (what would be its third and final victory of the season).

The winning goal was scored by freshman Cam Lee. Laxpower ranked the Dartmouth win over Princeton as the fourth-biggest upset of the 2013 season.

=== Brendan Callahan era ===
Brendan Callahan became the new head coach at Dartmouth in August 2014, replacing former head coach Andy Towers. The Big Green were 5-8 (1-5 in the Ivy League) in his first season in 2015.

The season was highlighted by the double overtime victory over Ivy League rival Harvard, 12-11, on March 21, 2015. Freshman Jack Korzelius scored the winning overtime goal in that game. Captain Philip Hession (First Team All-Ivy, USILA Scholar All-American) had a dominant game at the face-off X winning 20 of 24 draws and scooping 15 groundballs. Laxpower ranked the Dartmouth win over Harvard as the 2nd biggest upset in the 2015 season. Two Big Green players finished in the Division I top 10 statistically for 2015: Adam Fishman, attack, finished third in shooting percentage (.481), and Hession, a midfielder, finished sixth in groundballs per game (7.77) as well as ninth in face-off percentage (0.625).

In 2016, 2017, and 2018, the Big Green had a combined 5–35 record, going winless in all 18 Ivy League contests. The hiring of new offensive coordinator Joe Conner in the summer of 2018 represents a new chapter in the Brendan Callahan era.

During the 2023 season the Big Green had their first non-losing season since 2006, finishing the season with 6 wins and 6 losses. On March 25, the Big Green won their first game against an Ivy League opponent since 2015 with a 10-9 overtime win against Harvard. Following the 2023 season Dartmouth parted ways with Brendan Callahan.

=== Sean Kirwan era ===
Dartmouth hired Virginia's then offensive coordinator Sean Kirwan to become the next head coach of the Big Green in June 2023.

== Season results ==
The following is a list of Dartmouth's results by season as an NCAA Division I program:

Season	Coach	Overall	Conference	Standing	Postseason
Dudley Hendrick (Ivy League) (1970–1983)
1971	Dudley Hendrick	4–10	0–6	7th	
1972	Dudley Hendrick	5–10	0–6	7th	
1973	Dudley Hendrick	7–10	1–5	T–6th	
1974	Dudley Hendrick	4–9	1–5	6th	
1975	Dudley Hendrick	4–8	0–6	7th	
1976	Dudley Hendrick	7–5	2–4	T–5th	
1977	Dudley Hendrick	7–8	3–3	4th	
1978	Dudley Hendrick	4–8	2–4	5th	
1979	Dudley Hendrick	9–3	4–2	T–2nd	
1980	Dudley Hendrick	4–7	2–4	T–5th	
1981	Dudley Hendrick	6–5	3–3	4th	
1982	Dudley Hendrick	9–3	4–2	T–2nd	
1983	Dudley Hendrick	6–6	3–3	T–4th	
Dudley Hendrick:		77–99 (.438)	26–58 (.310)		
Scott Allison (Ivy League) (1984–1986)
1984	Scott Allison	6–7	2–4	5th	
1985	Scott Allison	3–9	1–5	6th	
1986	Scott Allison	3–13	1–5	T–6th	
Scott Allison:		12–29 (.293)	4–14 (.222)		
B.J. O'Hara (Ivy League) (1987–1989)
1987	B.J. O'Hara	4–8	0–6	7th	
1988	B.J. O'Hara	5–9	1–5	6th	
1989	B.J. O'Hara	5–10	0–6	7th	
B.J. O'Hara:		14–27 (.341)	1–17 (.056)		
Tim Nelson (Ivy League) (1990–1998)
1990	Tim Nelson	2–11	0–6	7th	
1991	Tim Nelson	1–14	0–6	7th	
1992	Tim Nelson	5–8	0–6	7th	
1993	Tim Nelson	3–9	0–6	7th	
1994	Tim Nelson	10–4	3–3	4th	
1995	Tim Nelson	9–4	2–4	T–5th	
1996	Tim Nelson	6–6	2–4	5th	
1997	Tim Nelson	5–7	2–4	5th	
1998	Tim Nelson	6–7	1–5	T–6th	
Tim Nelson:		47–70 (.402)	10–44 (.185)		
Rick Sowell (Ivy League) (1999–2003)
1999	Rick Sowell	5–8	2–4	T–4th	
2000	Rick Sowell	5–9	0–6	7th	
2001	Rick Sowell	6–8	1–5	7th	
2002	Rick Sowell	6–7	0–6	7th	
2003	Rick Sowell	11–3	5–1	T–1st	NCAA Division I First Round
Rick Sowell:		33–35 (.485)	8–22 (.267)		
Bill Wilson (Ivy League) (2004–2009)
2004	Bill Wilson	8–5	3–3	T–3rd	
2005	Bill Wilson	8–4	4–2	T–2nd	
2006	Bill Wilson	8–7	3–3	T–4th	
2007	Bill Wilson	5–10	1–5	T–6th	
2008	Bill Wilson	7–7	3–3	T–4th	
2009	Bill Wilson	4–11	1–5	T–6th	
Bill Wilson:		40–44 (.476)	15–21 (.417)		
Andy Towers (Ivy League) (2010–2014)
2010	Andy Towers	5–8	2–4	T–5th	
2011	Andy Towers	5–9	1–5	7th	
2012	Andy Towers	5–9	1–5	T–6th	
2013	Andy Towers	3–11	1–5	7th	
2014	Andy Towers	2–10	0–6	7th	
Andy Towers:		20–47 (.299)	5–25 (.167)		
Brendan Callahan (Ivy League) (2015–2023)
2015	Brendan Callahan	5–8	1–5	7th	
2016	Brendan Callahan	1–13	0–6	7th	
2017	Brendan Callahan	2–11	0–6	7th	
2018	Brendan Callahan	2–11	0–6	7th	
2019	Brendan Callahan	2–11	0–6	7th	
2020	Brendan Callahan	3–1	0–0	†	†
2021	Brendan Callahan	1–1	0–0	††	††
2022	Brendan Callahan	4–9	0–6	7th	
2023	Brendan Callahan	6–6	1–5	7th	
Brendan Callahan:		26–71 (.268)	2–40 (.048)		
Sean Kirwan (Ivy League) (2024–present)
2024	Sean Kirwan	3–10	0–6	7th	
2025	Sean Kirwan	8–5	2–4	5th	
2026	Sean Kirwan	4–9	0–6	7th	
Sean Kirwan:		15–24 (.385)	2–16 (.111)		
Total:		516–645–4 (.445)			
National champion Postseason invitational champion Conference regular season champion Conference regular season and conference tournament champion Division regular season champion Division regular season and conference tournament champion Conference tournament champion

†NCAA canceled 2020 collegiate activities due to the COVID-19 virus.
†† Ivy League cancelled 2021 collegiate season due to the COVID-19 virus.
