= Quint Kessenich =

American sportscaster (born 1967)

- Kessenich in 2026

Personal information
- Born: November 22, 1967 (age 58) Long Island, New York, U.S.

Sport
- Position: Goalie
- NLL teams: Baltimore Thunder
- NCAA team: Johns Hopkins University
- Pro career: 1999

Quint Elroy Kessenich (/ˈkɛsnɪk/ KESS-nik; born November 22, 1967) is an American sportscaster for ABC and ESPN television covering lacrosse, basketball, football, hockey, wrestling and horse racing since 1993.

== Career ==
Kessenich is a former All-American lacrosse goalkeeper. He attended Johns Hopkins University from 1987 to 1990, where he was a two-time winner of the Ensign C. Markland Kelly Jr. Award as the nation's best goalie. Kessenich played one year of professional lacrosse with the Baltimore Thunder in 1999, and played at the amateur level for the storied Mount Washington Lacrosse Club.

He got his writing debut with a horse racing newspaper called The Saratoga Special, writing for brothers Joe and Sean Clancy in the famed horse racing town of Saratoga Springs, New York. He is also a regular contributor to the lacrosse magazine, Inside Lacrosse. He was a color commentator with Joe Beninati or Scott Garceau for Chesapeake Bayhawks games on NBC Sports Washington and ESPN3.

Kessenich attended Lynbrook High School in Lynbrook, New York, where he starred in soccer, wrestling (winning two county championships) and lacrosse.

On November 29, 2013, Kessenich made national headlines when he interviewed an indignant Bo Pelini at halftime of the Iowa-Nebraska football game telecast on ABC in which the Nebraska coach responded to the reporter's inquiry on a pair of Cornhusker turnovers with "What do you think? What kind of question is that?" The incident came one week after Michigan State Spartans football coach Mark Dantonio snapped at Kessenich during the halftime interview.

Awards and achievements
Preceded by Jim Beardmore	Ensign C. Markland Kelly Jr. Award; 1987–1988	Succeeded by Tony Guido
