= Aaron Fenton =

American lacrosse player

- Born: January 18, 1982 (age 43); Philadelphia, Pennsylvania, U.S.
- Height: 6 ft 0 in (1.83 m)
- Weight: 195 pounds (88 kg)
- Position: Goalie
- MLL team: San Francisco Dragons
- NCAA team: Duke Blue Devils
- Pro career: 2006–
- Nickname: Milkman, Superstar

Aaron Fenton (born January 18, 1982) of Philadelphia, Pennsylvania is a lacrosse goaltender. He attended Duke University before being selected by the San Francisco Dragons.

== MLL career ==
2006 MLL Rookie Season. Appeared in two games. Played in his first professional game on 6/3 @ Chicago where he allowed one goal and recorded four saves in 7:00, and played 8:36 on 7/8 vs Chicago allowing one goal and recording one save.

== NCAA career ==
Completed a spectacular senior season helping Duke to the NCAA Championship Game. On the season made 210 saves with a .629 save percentage. Named Division I National Goalie of the Year. In addition named 1st Team All American, 1st Team All Atlantic Coast Conference and was named to the ACC All Tournament Team. Was selected as Duke's Defenseman of the Year and was Duke's Male Scholar-Athlete of the Year. As a junior was selected as Duke's Co-Defenseman of the Year after recording 122 saves.

== Post-playing career ==
Fenton is currently the Vice President of Development for Boston Properties, the largest office REIT in the world. He works on procuring leveraged buyouts. Fenton spearheads all projects in Boston Properties' west coast development pipeline. Some of Fenton's newest projects include a 1.1 million square foot office complex in San Francisco's South of Market neighborhood and a 324,000 square foot mixed-use tower adjacent to Oakland's MacArthur station (BART).

== Awards ==
- 2005 Ensign C. Markland Kelly, Jr. Award (NCAA Goalie of the Year)
