= Ensign C. Markland Kelly Jr. Award =

The Ensign C. Markland Kelly Jr. Award is presented annually by the USILA to the top college goaltender in NCAA Divisions I, II, and III. Johns Hopkins has won the most awards, with 14. Starting in 1990, the award has also been presented to the top women's goaltender in NCAA Divisions I, II & III. The top high-school player in Maryland lacrosse is also given an award in his honor. His name is also on various dedications throughout Baltimore. The Gilman School's weight training facility is named after him, as is the McDonogh School's football field.

The award is named for Charles Markland Kelly Jr., a native of Baltimore who attended Friends School of Baltimore, Gilman School, and McDonogh School and was a standout goalie for the University of Maryland lacrosse team until October 1940. At that time, with World War II imminent, he left school to become a pilot in the US Navy. In August, 1941, he received his wings and was commissioned an ensign. He was assigned to duty as a fighter pilot with Fighter Squadron 8 (VF-8) on board the USS Hornet (CV-8). Flying a Grumman F4F Wildcat on an escort mission for the carrier's bombers at the Battle of Midway, he failed to return from the initial strike, and was reported missing in action on June 4, 1942.

In memory of his son, Mr. Kelly Sr. established the Ensign C. Markland Kelly Jr. Memorial Foundation. The foundation provided the initial funding for the U.S. Lacrosse Hall of Fame, and presents annual awards for outstanding high-school and college lacrosse players. The foundation has also provided grants for schools, colleges, youth programs and other civic and cultural institutions, as well as funding for American Legion posts, one of which has been named in his honor.

== Men's award winners ==
Year	Player	School
1949	Dick Seth	Navy
1950	Bill Clements	Washington & Lee
1951	Joe Sollers	Johns Hopkins
1952	Bill Larsh	Maryland
1953	Bill Russell	Washington College
1954	Jack Jones	Navy
1955	Jim Kappler	Maryland
1956	Jim Kappler	Maryland
1957	Jim Kappler	Maryland
1958	Jimmy Lewis	Washington & Lee
1959	Ed Nippard	University of Baltimore
1960	Ed Nippard	University of Baltimore
1961	Jimmy Greenwood	Johns Hopkins
1962	John Beck	Johns Hopkins
1963	Dennis Wedekind	Navy
1964	Jack Schofield	Maryland
1965	Dennis Wedekind	Navy
1966	Dick Alter	Brown
1967	Butch Hilliard	Cornell
1968	Mac Ogilvie	Navy
1968	Butch Hilliard	Cornell
1969	Pete Kramer	North Carolina
1970	Len Supko	Navy
1971	Bob Rule	Cornell
1972	Les Matthews	Johns Hopkins
1973	Les Matthews	Johns Hopkins
1974	Skeet Chadwick	Washington & Lee
1975	Rodney Rullman	Virginia
1976	Daniel R. Mackesey	Cornell
1977	Daniel R. Mackesey	Cornell
1978	Mike Federico	Johns Hopkins
1979	Mike Federico	Johns Hopkins
1980	Bob Clements	Washington & Lee
1981	Tom Sears	North Carolina
1982	Tom Sears	North Carolina
1983	George Slabowski	Army
1984	Larry Quinn	Johns Hopkins
1985	Larry Quinn	Johns Hopkins
1986	Peter Sheehan	Virginia
1987	Jim Beardmore	Maryland
1988	Quint Kessenich	Johns Hopkins
1989	Quint Kessenich	Johns Hopkins
1990	Tony Guido	Yale
1991	Andy Piazza	North Carolina
1992	Scott Bacigalupo	Princeton
1993	Scott Bacigalupo	Princeton
1994	Scott Bacigalupo	Princeton
1995	Brian Dougherty	Maryland
1996	Brian Dougherty	Maryland
1997	Greg Cattrano	Brown
1998	Brian Carcaterra	Johns Hopkins
1999	Mickey Jarboe	Navy
2000	Mickey Jarboe	Navy
2001	Trevor Tierney	Princeton
2002	Nick Murtha	Johns Hopkins
2003	Tillman Johnson	Virginia
2004	Matt Russell	Navy
2005	Aaron Fenton	Duke
2006	Alex Hewit	Princeton
2007	Matt McMonagle	Cornell
2008	Joey Kemp	Notre Dame
2009	Jordan Burke	Brown
2010	John Galloway	Syracuse
2011	John Galloway	Syracuse
2012	John Kemp	Notre Dame
2013	Austin Kaut	Penn State
2014	Niko Amato	Maryland
2015	Kyle Bernlohr	Maryland
2016	Jack Kelly	Brown
2017	Ben Pugh	Richmond
2018	JD Colarusso	Albany
2019	Sean Sconone	UMass
2020	None	(Season canceled due to COVID-19 Pandemic)
2021	Owen McElroy	Georgetown
2022	Owen McElroy	Georgetown
2023	Liam Entenmann	Notre Dame
2024	Liam Entenmann	Notre Dame
2025	Caleb Fyock	Ohio State
2026	Sean Byrne; Ryan Croddick	Army; Princeton

=== By university ===
Rank	School	Number of Awards	Winning years
1	Johns Hopkins University	13	1951, 1961, 1962, 1972, 1973, 1978, 1979, 1984, 1985, 1988, 1989, 1998, 2002
2	University of Maryland	10	1952, 1955, 1965, 1957, 1964, 1987, 1995, 1996, 2014, 2015
3	United States Naval Academy	9	1949, 1954, 1963, 1965, 1968, 1970, 1999, 2000, 2004
T-4	Cornell University	6	1967, 1968, 1971, 1976, 1977, 2007
T-4	Princeton University	6	1992, 1993, 1994, 2001, 2006 2026
T-6	Washington and Lee University	4	1950, 1958, 1974, 1980
T-6	University of North Carolina	4	1969, 1981, 1982, 1991
T-6	Brown University	4	1966, 1997, 2009, 2016
T-6	University of Notre Dame	4	2008, 2012, 2023, 2024
10	University of Virginia	3	1975, 1986, 2003
T-11	University of Baltimore	2	1959, 1960
T-11	Georgetown	2	2021, 2022
T-14	Multiple winners tied with 1		

== Women's award winners ==
Year	Player	School
1990	Sue Heether	Loyola College in Maryland
1991	Sarah Leary	Harvard University
1992	Sarah Leary	Harvard University
1993	Mandy Stevenson	University of Maryland
1994	Erin O'Neill	Princeton University
1995	Erin O'Neill	Princeton University
1996	Michelle Cusimano	University of Virginia
1997	Lisa Dixon	College of William and Mary
1998	Chris Lindsey	Georgetown University
1999	Alex Kahoe	University of Maryland
2000	Alex Kahoe	University of Maryland
2001	Bowen Holden	Georgetown University
2002	Tricia Dabrowski	Loyola College in Maryland
2003	Alexis Venechanos	University of Maryland
2004	Elizabeth Tortorelli	Penn State University
2005	Anne Sheridan	Boston University
2006	Maggie Koch	Georgetown University
2007	Sarah Waxman	University of Pennsylvania
2008	Sarah Waxman	University of Pennsylvania
2009	Logan Ripley	University of North Carolina, Chapel Hill
2010	Liz Hogan	Syracuse University
2011	Brittany Dipper	University of Maryland
2012	Mikey Meagher	University of Florida
2013	Mikey Meagher	University of Florida
2014	Liz Colgan	University of Virginia
2015	Caylee Waters	University of North Carolina, Chapel Hill
2016	Caylee Waters (tied)	University of North Carolina, Chapel Hill
2016	Megan Ward (tied)	University of North Carolina, Chapel Hill
2017	Megan Taylor	University of Maryland
2018	Julia Lisella	University of Colorado
2019	Megan Taylor	University of Maryland

=== By university ===
Rank	School	Number of Awards	Winning years
1	University of Maryland	7	1993, 1999, 2000, 2003, 2011, 2017, 2019
T-2	Georgetown University	3	1998, 2001, 2006
T-2	University of North Carolina	3	2009, 2015, 2016
T-4	Harvard University	2	1991, 1992
T-4	Loyola College in Maryland	2	1990, 2002
T-4	Princeton University	2	1994, 1995
T-4	University of Florida	2	2012, 2013
T-4	University of Pennsylvania	2	2007, 2008
T-4	University of Virginia	2	1996, 2014
T-10	Boston University	1	2005
T-10	College of William & Mary	1	1997
T-10	Penn State University	1	2004
T-10	Syracuse University	1	2010
T-10	University of Colorado	1	2018

== See also ==
- United States Navy Memorial § Other Navy memorials
