= Jim Beardmore =

American lacrosse player and coach

Personal information
- Nationality: American

Sport
- Position: Goalie
- MILL team: Washington Wave; Pittsburgh Bulls
- Pro career: 1988–1992

Jim Beardmore is a former All-American lacrosse goalie, and coach. He was the head coach for the Hamburg Warriors B-Team. He is the son of former University of Maryland coach and Lacrosse Hall of Fame inductee Clayton "Buddy" Beardmore.

Beardmore attended University of Maryland after graduating from The Severn School in Severna Park, MD. In 1987 was awarded the Ensign C. Markland Kelly, Jr. Award as the NCAA's Goalie of the Year. In addition, Beardmore was named a first team All-American, Atlantic Coast Conference Player of the Year, and received first-team All-ACC mention.

Beardmore played five seasons in the Major Indoor Lacrosse League with the Washington Wave and the Pittsburgh Bulls.

Beardmore served as head coach for the Denver Outlaws of the Major League Lacrosse in the 2007 MLL season. In addition, he has served as head coach for a number of high schools, including Severna Park, and is director of Nike Lacrosse Summer Camps and All-American Sports Camps. He served as Head Lacrosse Coach for Colorado Academy during the school's 2008 season.

Preceded by Peter Sheehan	Ensign C. Markland Kelly, Jr. Award; 1987	Succeeded by Quint Kessenich
