= VF-8 (1941–1942) =

Fighting Squadron 8
- Active: 2 September 1941 – 28 August 1942
- Country: United States
- Branch: United States Navy
- Part of: Inactive
- Aircraft: F4F Wildcat
- Engagements: World War II

Fighting Squadron 8 or VF-8 was an aviation unit of the U.S. Navy. It was originally established 2 September 1941 and disestablished on 28 August 1942.

== Operational history ==
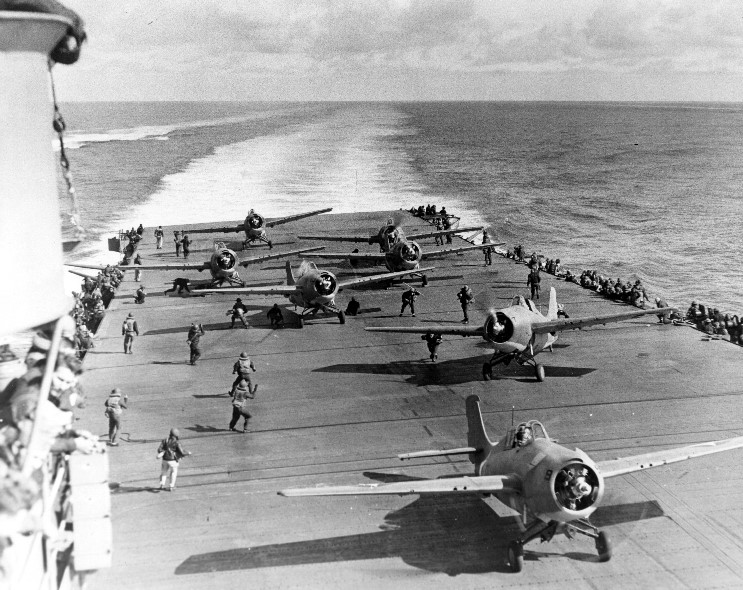
VF-8 F4Fs prepare to launch from USS Hornet in 1942

VF-8 was deployed as part of Carrier Air Group 8 (CVG-8) aboard the USS Hornet. Initially equipped with the F4F-3 Wildcat, in February 1942 VF-8 reequipped with the F4F-4 at Naval Air Station Alameda while the Hornet embarked the 16 B-25B Mitchell medium bombers to be used in the Doolittle Raid.

During the Battle of Midway 10 VF-8 F4Fs were forced to ditch due to lack of fuel while searching for the Japanese fleet. Two of the pilots were lost at sea. Following the battle in June 1942 Hornet returned to Naval Station Pearl Harbor where VF-8 was disembarked and replaced by VF-72.

== Home port assignments ==
- NAS Alameda
- Naval Station Pearl Harbor

== Aircraft assignment ==
- F4F-3/4 Wildcat

== See also ==
- List of inactive United States Navy aircraft squadrons
- History of the United States Navy
