= Cornell–Princeton lacrosse rivalry =

College sports rivalry

- Cornell Big Red Princeton Tigers
- First meeting: April 10, 1922; Princeton 11, Cornell 1
- Latest meeting: May 3, 2026; Princeton 19, Cornell 9 Ithaca, NY
- Next meeting: TBD

Statistics
- Total meetings: 90
- All-time series: Cornell, 45–43–2
- Largest victory: Princeton, 19–1 (1936); Cornell, 23–5 (1985)
- Longest win streak: Cornell, 22 (1968–1989)
- Current win streak: Princeton, 1 (2026–Present)

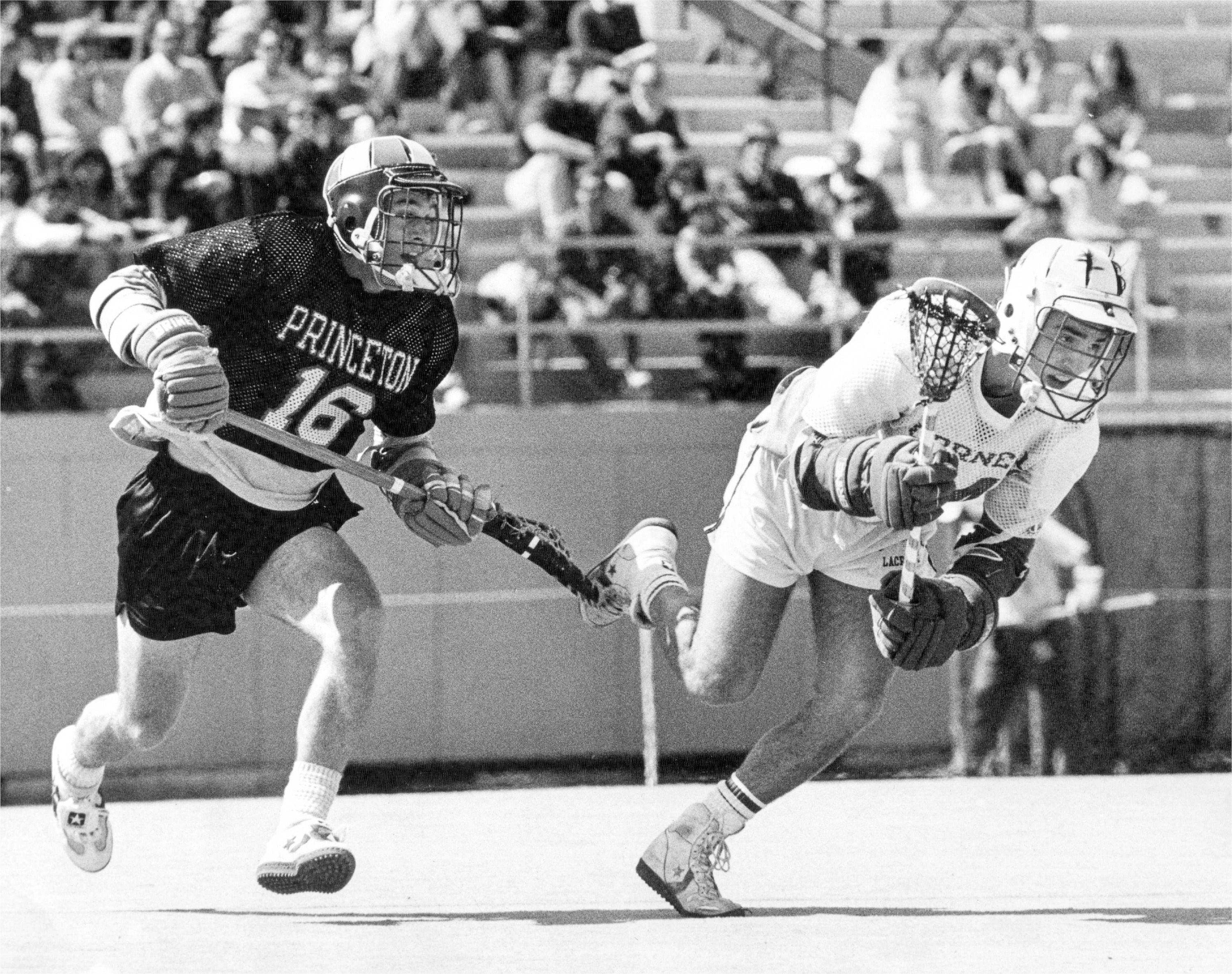
In their April 25, 1987 match, Cornell beat Princeton, 13-2

The Cornell–Princeton lacrosse rivalry is a college lacrosse rivalry between Princeton University and Cornell University and their respective men's lacrosse teams, Princeton Tigers and Cornell Big Red.

The rivalry stems from the dominance of the two programs in the Ivy League, where in the first 69 seasons (1956 through 2026 seasons, excluding pandemic canceled years of 2020 and 2021), Cornell won 34 Ivy League lacrosse championships (21 outright, 13 shared) and Princeton won 28 league titles (18 outright, 10 shared). The next nearest team in lacrosse titles is Brown University, which has won 11 (five outright, six shared) The Ivy League awards the league championship to the team with the best record at the conclusion of the regular season. In the event two or more teams are tied with identical records, the title is shared with no tie breaking mechanism. The teams shared the title in 2002, 2004, 2006, 2009, 2010 (also with Brown and Yale University), 2015 (also with Brown), and 2026.

== History ==
In October 2011, CornellBigRed.com described the Cornell–Princeton lacrosse rivalry as "The marquee matchup in Ivy League lacrosse". Cornell has won four NCAA Division I Men's Lacrosse Championships (1971, 1976, 1977, 2025) and four pre-NCAA era national championships (1903, 1907, 1914, 1916). Princeton claims six NCAA championships (1992, 1994, 1996, 1997, 1998, 2001) and six pre-NCAA era national championships (1884, 1885, 1937, 1942, 1951, 1953). The most recent Ivy League title for both Cornell and Princeton was in 2026 when they shared the championship with identical 5-1 records.

Although the two schools have a long rivalry, they did not oppose each other in postseason play until the quarterfinals of the 2009 NCAA Division I Men's Lacrosse Championship at Hofstra University's Shuart Stadium. Cornell won 6–4.

In 2010, Princeton defeated Cornell 10–9 in the inaugural Ivy League lacrosse championship tournament and received the league's automatic berth to the 2010 NCAA Division I Men's Lacrosse Championship. Cornell would win the 2011 Ivy League tournament, defeating Harvard 15–6 in the final. Princeton defeated Cornell in the semifinals of both the 2013 and 2015 tournaments, but fell to Yale in the championship game both times. Cornell won the Ivy League tournament again in 2018 and 2025 (defeating Princeton 20–15 in the 2025 championship game) while Princeton won in 2023, 2024 and 2026 (defeating Cornell 19-9). Princeton has won four tournament championships to Cornell's three, with both trailing Yale's five tournament championships.

The teams first met in 1922, with Princeton winning 11–1. Cornell leads the series 45–43–2 over 90 games.

== Rival accomplishments ==
The following summarizes the accomplishments of the two programs.

Team	Cornell Big Red	Princeton Tigers
Pre-NCAA National Titles	5	6
NCAA National Titles	4	6
NCAA Final Four Appearances	15	11
NCAA Tournament Appearances	32	25
NCAA Tournament Record	40–27	33–17
Conference Tournament Titles	3	4
Conference Championships	34	28
Tewaarton Award Recipients	3	0
Lt. Raymond Enners Award Recipients	7	2
Consensus First Team All-Americans	57	78
All-time Program Record	826–502–27	721–502–18
All-time Winning Percentage	.620	.588

== Game Results ==
Cornell victories	Princeton victories	Tie games

No.	Date	Location	Winner	Score
1	April 10, 1922	Princeton, NJ	Princeton	11–1
2	April 18, 1925	Princeton, NJ	Princeton	3–1
3	May 19, 1928	Ithaca, NY	Princeton	6–5
4	May 18, 1929	Ithaca, NY	Princeton	4–3
5	April 4, 1930	Princeton, NJ	Tie	2–2
6	April 18, 1931	Princeton, NJ	Tie	1–1
7	April 16, 1932	Ithaca, NY	Cornell	3–2
8	April 15, 1933	Princeton, NJ	Princeton	5–4
9	April 28, 1934	Ithaca, NY	Princeton	10–1
10	April 27, 1935	Princeton, NJ	Princeton	20–7
11	April 25, 1936	Ithaca, NY	Princeton	19–1
12	April 23, 1938	Princeton, NJ	Princeton	9–1
13	April 22, 1939	Ithaca, NY	Princeton	5–4
14	April 29, 1940	Princeton, NJ	Princeton	17–8
15	April 19, 1941	Ithaca, NY	Princeton	14–3
16	May 12, 1956	Princeton, NJ	Princeton	15–3
17	May 22, 1957	Ithaca, NY	Princeton	11–2
18	May 24, 1958	Princeton, NJ	Princeton	11–7
19	May 23, 1959	Ithaca, NY	Princeton	9–8
20	May 21, 1960	Princeton, NJ	Princeton	6–5
21	May 20, 1961	Ithaca, NY	Princeton	9–6
22	May 19, 1962	Princeton, NJ	Princeton	16–5
23	May 25, 1963	Ithaca, NY	Princeton	9–8
24	April 18, 1964	Princeton, NJ	Princeton	18–8
25	May 22, 1965	Ithaca, NY	Cornell	9–8
26	May 21, 1966	Princeton, NJ	Cornell	8–7
27	May 20, 1967	Ithaca, NY	Princeton	7–5
28	May 18, 1968	Princeton, NJ	Cornell	7–6^{OT}
29	May 17, 1969	Ithaca, NY	Cornell	13–9
30	May 16, 1970	Princeton, NJ	Cornell	15–5
31	May 15, 1971	Ithaca, NY	Cornell	21–6

No.	Date	Location	Winner	Score
32	May 6, 1972	Princeton, NJ	Cornell	9–8
33	May 12, 1973	Ithaca, NY	#10 Cornell	14–4
34	May 11, 1974	Princeton, NJ	#4 Cornell	17–4
35	May 10, 1975	Ithaca, NY	#2 Cornell	12–8
36	May 8, 1976	Princeton, NJ	#1 Cornell	14–8
37	May 7, 1977	Ithaca, NY	#1 Cornell	15–7
38	May 6, 1978	Princeton, NJ	#1 Cornell	11–7
39	May 5, 1979	Ithaca, NY	#3 Cornell	10–8
40	May 3, 1980	Princeton, NJ	#14 Cornell	11–3
41	May 2, 1981	Ithaca, NY	#13 Cornell	8–7
42	May 1, 1982	Princeton, NJ	#9 Cornell	15–8
43	April 30, 1983	Ithaca, NY	#3 Cornell	16–7
44	April 28, 1984	Princeton, NJ	#15 Cornell	10–6
45	April 27, 1985	Ithaca, NY	#11 Cornell	23–5
46	April 26, 1986	Princeton, NJ	Cornell	14–6
47	April 25, 1987	Ithaca, NY	#2 Cornell	13–2
48	April 30, 1988	Princeton, NJ	Cornell	21–5
49	April 29, 1989	Ithaca, NY	#10 Cornell	4–3
50	April 28, 1990	Princeton, NJ	#9 Princeton	14–6
51	April 27, 1991	Ithaca, NY	#5 Princeton	12–2
52	April 25, 1992	Princeton, NJ	#3 Princeton	10–9^{OT}
53	April 24, 1993	Ithaca, NY	#2 Princeton	13–8
54	April 23, 1994	Princeton, NJ	#2 Princeton	19–7
55	April 22, 1995	Ithaca, NY	Cornell	9–8
56	April 20, 1996	Princeton, NJ	#2 Princeton	19–6
57	April 19, 1997	Ithaca, NY	#1 Princeton	19–8
58	April 18, 1998	Princeton, NJ	#1 Princeton	15–5
59	April 24, 1999	Ithaca, NY	#11 Princeton	9–6
60	April 22, 2000	Princeton, NJ	#4 Princeton	9–5
61	April 21, 2001	Ithaca, NY	#1 Princeton	7–4
62	April 20, 2002	Princeton, NJ	#8 Princeton	12–7

No.	Date	Location	Winner	Score
63	April 19, 2003	Ithaca, NY	#2 Princeton	17–9
64	April 24, 2004	Princeton, NJ	#11 Cornell	12–11^{OT}
65	April 23, 2005	Ithaca, NY	#6 Cornell	17–4
66	April 22, 2006	Princeton, NJ	#5 Cornell	4–3
67	April 21, 2007	Ithaca, NY	#1 Cornell	10–6
68	April 19, 2008	Princeton, NJ	#17 Princeton	11–7
69	April 18, 2009	Ithaca, NY	#4 Cornell	10–7
70	May 16, 2009	Hempstead, NY	#7 Cornell	6–4
71	May 1, 2010	Princeton, NJ	#10 Cornell	10–9
72	May 9, 2010	Ithaca, NY	#9 Princeton	10–9^{OT}
73	April 30, 2011	Ithaca, NY	#3 Cornell	9–7
74	April 28, 2012	Princeton, NJ	#12 Princeton	14–9
75	April 27, 2013	East Rutherford, NJ	#6 Cornell	17–11
76	May 3, 2013	Ithaca, NY	#16 Princeton	14–13^{OT}
77	April 26, 2014	Bethpage, NY	#11 Cornell	12–10
78	April 25, 2015	Ithaca, NY	#12 Cornell	15–10
79	May 1, 2015	Providence, RI	#15 Princeton	11–7
80	April 30, 2016	Princeton, NJ	Princeton	7–6
81	April 29, 2017	Ithaca, NY	Cornell	18–17
82	April 28, 2018	Princeton, NJ	Princeton	14–8
83	April 27, 2019	Ithaca, NY	#9 Cornell	14–13
84	April 30, 2022	Princeton, NJ	Cornell	18–15
85	April 29, 2023	Ithaca, NY	#6 Cornell	14–13^{OT}
86	March 17, 2024	Princeton, NJ	#15 Cornell	15–14
87	March 15, 2025	Ithaca, NY	#6 Cornell	15–10
88	May 4, 2025	Ithaca, NY	#1 Cornell	20–15
89	March 21, 2026	Princeton, NJ	#10 Cornell	13–11
90	May 3, 2026	Ithaca, NY	#2 Princeton	19–9
Series: Cornell leads 45–43–2
