= 2026 NCAA Division I men's lacrosse tournament =

American collegiate lacrosse tournament

- Dates: May 6–25, 2026
- Teams: 18
- Finals site: Scott Stadium, Charlottesville, Virginia
- Champions: Princeton (7th title)
- Runner-up: Notre Dame (5th title game)
- Semifinalists: Duke (15th Final Four); Syracuse (28th Final Four)
- Winning coach: Matt Madalon (1st title)
- MOP: Ryan Croddick, Princeton

The 2026 NCAA Division I men's lacrosse tournament was the 55th annual single-elimination tournament to help determine the national championship for NCAA Division I men's college lacrosse. The semifinals and championship final were hosted by the University of Virginia at Scott Stadium in Charlottesville, Virginia. (Note: The stadium has a Charlottesville mailing address but is physically in unincorporated Albemarle County, which encloses but does not include the city of Charlottesville.) The site of the semifinal and championship final was changed because of the 2026 FIFA World Cup which is being hosted in part at Gillette Stadium, which was the initial host of the NCAA Lacrosse Championships for this year.

The Princeton Tigers won their 7th NCAA title against Notre Dame in this championship by beating Notre Dame 16–9. Chad Palumbo led the Tigers offensively with a six-point performance, while Tucker Wade, Quinn Krammer and Cooper Mueller all added multi-point outings as Princeton’s offense continued its strong postseason run. Andrew McMeekin once again controlled possession at the faceoff X, helping Princeton dominate opportunities throughout the afternoon.

Ryan Croddick, the tournament's most outstanding player, anchored the Princeton defense in goal, making key saves throughout the game as the Tigers held Notre Dame to single digits despite the early deficit.

== Format ==
A total of eighteen (18) total teams are scheduled to compete in the tournament based upon their performances during the regular season. For ten (10) conferences, entry into the tournament will be by means of the conference tournament automatic qualifier, while for the remaining eight (8) teams, at-large selection are to be determined by the NCAA selection committee.

== Teams ==
Seed	School	Conference	Berth Type	RPI	Regular season record
1	Princeton	Ivy League	Automatic	1	13–2
2	Notre Dame	ACC	At-large	2	10–2
3	North Carolina	ACC	At-large	4	12–4
4	Richmond	Atlantic 10	Automatic	3	14–1
5	Virginia	ACC	At-large	7	10–6
6	Syracuse	ACC	At-large	6	11–5
7	Cornell	Ivy League	At-Large	5	11–4
8	Penn State	Big Ten	Automatic	9	9–5
	Army	Patriot	Automatic	11	13–3
	Johns Hopkins	Big Ten	At-large	8	9–5
	Yale	Ivy League	At-large	12	9–5
	Georgetown	Big East	Automatic	13	10–4
	Duke	ACC	At-large	10	9–4
	Albany	America East	Automatic	22	11–5
	Robert Morris	Northeast	Automatic	26	11–5
	Jacksonville	ASUN	Automatic	28	10–5
	Marist	MAAC	Automatic	26	11–4
	Stony Brook	CAA	Automatic	32	10–5

== Bracket ==
Opening Round; May 6, ESPN+ Hosted by seeded team
Marist	10
Stony Brook	6
Robert Morris	7
Jacksonville	13

First round May 9–10, ESPN2 & ESPNU; Hosted by seeded team
1	Princeton	17
Marist	8
8	Penn State	10
Army	6
5	Virginia	10
Georgetown	14
4	Richmond	12
Duke	14
2	Notre Dame	18
Jacksonville	5
7	Cornell	8
Johns Hopkins	9*
6	Syracuse	16
Yale	15
3	North Carolina	24
UAlbany	6

Quarterfinals; May 16–17, ESPNU; Hempstead, NY and Newark, DE
1	Princeton	14
8	Penn State	10
Georgetown	6
Duke	16
2	Notre Dame	15
Johns Hopkins	9
6	Syracuse	13
3	North Carolina	11

Semifinals; May 23, ESPN2; Charlottesville, VA
1	Princeton	14
Duke	7
2	Notre Dame	15
6	Syracuse	7

National Championship; May 25, ESPN; Charlottesville, VA
1	Princeton	16
2	Notre Dame	9

* denotes overtime period

== Tournament Boxscores ==
=== Final ===
Team	1	2	3	4	Total
Notre Dame (13–3)	3	0	4	2	9
Princeton	3	8	2	3	16
Notre Dame scoring: Josh Yago 2, Will Angrick 2, Will Maheras, Matt Jeffrey, Dylan Faison, Luke Miller, Brock Behrman; Princeton scoring: Chad Palumbo 4, Colin Burns 3, Tucker Wade 2, Jake Vana 2, Porter Malkiel 1, Andrew McMeekin, John Dumphey Nate Kabiri, Cooper Mueller; Shots: Notre Dame 41, Princeton 53; Saves: Notre Dame – Thomas Ricciardelli 19, Patrick Jameison; Princeton – Ryan Croddick 13; Attendance: 24,061 – 5/25/2026 Charlottesville, Virginia (Scott Stadium)

=== Semifinals ===
Team	1	2	3	4	Total
Duke (11–5)	2	2	2	1	7
Princeton	3	3	5	3	14
Duke scoring: Ben Johnston 3, Mac Christmas, Cal Girard, Michael Ortlieb, Kyle Colsey; Princeton scoring: Colin Burns 4, Jake Vana 3, Nate Kabiri 3, Tucker Wade 2, Porter Malkiel 2; Shots: Duke 47, Princeton 46; Saves: Duke – Buck Cunningham 11, Patrick Jameison; Princeton – Ryan Croddick 20; Attendance: 24,396 – 5/23/2026 Charlottesville, Virginia (Scott Stadium)

Team	1	2	3	4	Total
Syracuse (13–6)	3	1	3	0	7
Notre Dame	4	3	2	6	15
Syracuse scoring: Finn Thomson 4, Luke Rhoa 2, Payton Anderson 1; Notre Dame scoring: Josh Yago 3, Brock Behrman 2, Max Busenkell 2, Luke Miller 2, Will Angrick, Matt Jeffery, Teddy Lally, Dylan Faison, Brady Pokorny, Will Maheras; Shots: Syracuse 45, Notre Dame 47; Saves: Syracuse – Jimmy McCool 11; Notre Dame – Thomas Ricciardelli 14; Attendance: 24,396 – 5/23/2026 Charlottesville, Virginia (Scott Stadium)

=== Quarterfinals ===
Team	1	2	3	4	Total
Georgetown (11–5)	1	0	3	2	6
Duke	3	3	5	5	16
Georgetown scoring: Jack Ransom 2, Joe Cesare, Rory Connor, George Acton, Lucas Dudemaine; Duke scoring: Max Sloat 4, Benn Johnson 3, Kyle Colsey 2, Thomas Mencke 2, Michael Ortlieb 2, Cal Girard, Brady Scioletti, Ian Dykes; Shots: Georgetown 33, Duke 38; Saves: Georgetown – Anderson Moore 14; Duke – Buck Cunningham 10, Patrick Jameison 2; Attendance: 6,807 – 5/17/2026 Newark, Delaware (Delaware Stadium)

Team	1	2	3	4	Total
Penn State (10–6)	2	4	3	1	10
Princeton	1	5	3	5	14
Penn State scoring: Chase Robertson 3, Kyle Lehman 2, Alex Ross, John Jude Considine, Andrew Beard, Mark Watters, Liam Matthews; Princeton scoring: Tucker Wade 4, Chad Palumbo 2, Jake Vana, Colin Burns, Parker Reynolds, Porter Malkiel, Quinn Krammer, John Dunphey, Andrew McMeekin, Cooper Mueller; Shots: Penn State 27, Princeton 49; Saves: Penn State – Preston Hawkins 17; Princeton – Ryan Croddick 8; Attendance: 6,807 – 5/17/2026 Newark, Delaware (Delaware Stadium)

Team	1	2	3	4	Total
North Carolina (13–5)	1	5	2	3	11
Syracuse	1	4	4	4	13
North Carolina scoring: Anthony Raio 2, Brevin Wilson 2, Dominic Pietramala 2, Peter Thomann, Ty English, Brady Wambach, James Matan, Owen Duffy; Syracuse scoring: Finn Thomason 3, Joey Spallina 3, John Mullen 2, Luke Rhoa 2, Bogue Hahn, Wyatt Hottle, Michael Leo; Shots: North Carolina 46, Syracuse 38; Saves: North Carolina – Kent Goode 7; Syracuse – Jimmy McCool 13; Attendance: 10,244 – 5/16/2026 Hempstead, New York (James M. Shuart Stadium)

Team	1	2	3	4	Total
Johns Hopkins (10–6)	3	3	1	2	9
Notre Dame	2	4	5	4	15
Johns Hopkins scoring: Matt Collison 2, Charlie Iler 2, Hunter Chauvette 2, Erick Chick, Jameson Smith, Chuck Rawson; Notre Dame scoring: Josh Yago 4, Will Maheras 2, Brock Behrman 2, Matt Jeffery 2, Luke Miller 2, Will Angrick, Christian Alacqua, Brady Pokorny; Shots: Johns Hopkins 26, Notre Dame 41; Saves: Johns Hopkins – Oran Gelinas 9; Notre Dame – Thomas Ricciardelli 6; Attendance: 10,244 – 5/16/2026 Hempstead, New York (James M. Shuart Stadium)

=== First Round ===
Team	1	2	3	4	Total
Georgetown	3	5	2	4	14
Virginia (10–7)	5	2	2	1	10
Georgetown scoring: Rory Connor 3, Jack Ranson 3, Jack Schubert 3, Liam Connor, Jack Bickel, Charlie McGurrin, Joe Vranizan, Natty Mason; Virginia scoring: Truitt Sunderland 2, Ryan Colsey 2, McCabe Million, Brendan Million, Lindan Verville, Robby Hopper, Owen Crann, Chase Band; Shots: Georgetown 36, Virginia 44; Saves: Georgetown – Anderson Moore 15; Virginia – Jake Marek 9; Attendance: TBA – 5/10/2026 Charlottesville, Virginia (Klöckner Stadium)

Team	1	2	3	4	Total
Yale (9–6)	2	6	3	4	15
Syracuse	3	3	7	3	16
Yale scoring: Cole Cashion 3, Sean Grogan 2, Peter Moynihan 2, Dylan Blekicki 2, Luke Paschal 2, Cole Jackson 2, Patrick Pisano, William Sheehan; Syracuse scoring: Michael Leo 3, Finn Thomason 3, Luke Rhoa 2, Joey Spallina 2, Wyatt Hottle 2, Payton Anderson, Tucker Kellogg, John Mullen, Tyler McCarthy; Shots: Yale 48, Syracuse 43; Saves: Yale – Ben Friedman 6; Syracuse – Jimmy McCool 17; Attendance: 4,341 – 5/10/2026 Syracuse, New York (JMA Wireless Dome)

Team	1	2	3	4	Total
Marist (12–5)	2	2	0	4	8
Princeton	6	2	8	1	17
Marist scoring: Peter Murray 2, Drew Anderson 2, Jayce Konowitz 2, Collin Patrick, Steven Cain; Princeton scoring: Chad Palumbo 6, Nate Kabiri 3, Colin Burns 3, Tucker Wade 2, Quinn Krammer 2, John Dunphey; Shots: Marist 49, Princeton 41; Saves: Marist – Richie Metzger 11; Princeton – Ryan Croddick 14; Attendance: 1,347 – 5/10/2026 Princeton, New Jersey (Class of 1952 Stadium)

Team	1	2	3	4	Total
Jacksonville (11–6)	1	0	1	3	5
Notre Dame	5	4	5	4	18
Jacksonville scoring: William Krupsky 2, Jack Taylor, Daylin John-Hill, Parker Addison; Notre Dame scoring: Luke Miller 5, Teddy Lally 3, Matt Jeffery 2, Brock Behrman 2, Gavin Lynch 2, Josh Yago, Will Maheras, Thomas Porell, Jalen Seymour; Shots: Jacksonville 36, Notre Dame 54; Saves: Jacksonville – Ryan Della Rocco 13; Notre Dame – Thomas Ricciardelli 16, Alex Zepf; Attendance: 1,297 – 5/10/2026 South Bend, Indiana (Arlotta Family Lacrosse Stadium)

Team	1	2	3	4	Total
Duke	3	3	3	5	14
Richmond (14–2)	2	2	6	2	12
Duke scoring: Liam Kershis 3, Benn Johnson 2, Kyle Colsey 2, Aiden Maguire 2, Michael Ortlieb, Tomas Delgado, Jack Pappendick, Connor Nolen, Anthony Drago; Richmond scoring: Gavin Creo 4, Joe Sheridan 2, Daniel Picart 2, Aidan O'Neil, Lucas Littlejohn, Leo Caine, Brayden Penafeather-Stevenson; Shots: Duke 40, Richmond 27; Saves: Duke – Buck Cunningham 7; Richmond – Connor Knight 12; Attendance: 6,805 – 5/9/2026 Richmond, Virginia (E. Claiborne Robins Stadium)

Team	1	2	3	4	OT	Total
Johns Hopkins	2	1	3	2	1	9
Cornell (11–5)	3	3	1	3	0	8
Johns Hopkins scoring: Chuck Rawson 2, Jimmy Ayers 2, Matt Collison, Hunter Chauvette, Charlie Iler, Brooks English, David Disque; Cornell scoring: Rowyn Nurry 3, AJ Nikolic 2, Brian Luzzi, Ryan GOldstein, Willem Firth; Shots: Johns Hopkins 40, Cornell 30; Saves: Johns Hopkins – Oran Gelinas 3; Cornell – Matthew Tully 17; Attendance: 1,815 – 5/9/2026 Ithaca, New York (Schoellkopf Field)

Team	1	2	3	4	Total
Army (13–4)	1	2	1	2	6
Penn State	3	3	1	3	10
Army scoring: Brayden Fountain 2, Gunnar Fellows, Hill Plunkett, Evan Plunkett, Tyler Mathews; Penn State scoring: Hunter Aquino 3, Andrew Beard 2, Michael Faraone 2, Luke Walstrum, Kyle Lehman, Brendan Leary; Shots: Army 29, Penn State 55; Saves: Army – Sean Byrne 20; Penn State – Preston Hawkins 12; Attendance: 1,739 – 5/9/2026 University Park, Pennsylvania (Panzer Stadium)

Team	1	2	3	4	Total
Albany (11–6)	1	1	2	2	6
North Carolina	7	5	7	5	24
Albany scoring: Ryan Doherty 2, Alex Pfeiffer 2, Kevin Carney, Teharonhiorens McComber; North Carolina scoring: Dominic Pietramala 10, Anthony Raio 3, Brevin Wilson 2, Mason Szewczyk, Parker Hoffman, Tayden Bultman, Peter Thomann, Owen Dixon, Andrew Preis, Brock Geraci, Niko Karetsos, Caswell Friedman; Shots: Cornell 40, Albany 30; Saves: Albany – Brady Smith 10, Matthew Tully 1; North Carolina – Kent Goode 8; Attendance: 1,402 – 5/9/2026 Chapel Hill, North Carolina (Dorrance Field)

=== Opening Round ===
Team	1	2	3	4	Total
Stony Brook (10–6)	0	2	3	1	6
Marist	2	2	2	4	10
Stony Brook scoring: Collin Williamson 5, Jake Lewis; Marist scoring: Peter Murray 4, Collin Patrick 4, Sean Mullan, Steven Cain; Shots: Stony Brook 37, Marist 45; Saves: Stony Brook – Tommy Wilk 9, Marist – Richie Metzger 9; Attendance: 1,513 – 5/06/2026 Poughkeepsie, New York. (Tenney Stadium at Leonidoff Field)

Team	1	2	3	4	Total
Jacksonville	5	3	3	2	13
Robert Morris (11–6)	2	1	0	4	7
Jacksonville scoring: William Krupsky 4, Jack Taylor 3, Nicky Brown 2, Daylin John-Hill, Zane Czeschin, Tate Jones, Connor Sydnor; Robert Morris scoring: Ben Eck 4, Calum Brennan, Luke Prezioso, Tommy Linehan; Shots: Jacksonville 36; Robert Morris 34; Saves: Jacksonville – Ryan Della Rocco 10; Robert Morris – Nate Fetcher 13; Attendance: 1,038 – 5/06/2026 Moon Township, Pennsylvania. (Joe Walton Stadium)

== Record by conference ==
Conference	# of Bids	Record	Win %	OR	R16	QF	SF	CG	NC
America East	1	0–1	.000	–	1	–	–	–	–
ACC	5	8–5	.615	–	5	4	3	1	–
ASUN	1	1–1	.500	1	1	–	–	–	–
Atlantic 10	1	0–1	.000	–	1	–	–	–	–
Big Ten	2	2–2	.500	–	2	2	–	–	–
Big East	1	1–1	.500	–	1	1	–	–	–
CAA	1	0–1	.000	1	–	–	–	–	–
Ivy League	3	4–2	.667	–	3	1	1	1	1
MAAC	1	1–1	.500	1	1	–	–	–	–
Northeast	1	0–1	.000	1	–	–	–	–	–
Patriot	1	0–1	.000	–	1	–	–	–	–

== All-Tournament Team ==
Ryan Croddick, Princeton (Most Outstanding Player)
Colin Burns, Princeton
Nate Kabiri, Princeton
Chad Palumbo, Princeton
Tucker Wade, Princeton
Shawn Lyght, Notre Dame
Thomas Ricciardelli, Notre Dame
Josh Yago, Notre Dame
Benn Johnston, Duke
Finn Thomson, Syracuse

== See also ==
- NCAA Division II men's lacrosse tournament
- NCAA Division III men's lacrosse tournament
- 2026 NCAA Division I women's lacrosse tournament
