= Jim Mitchell (lacrosse) =

Jim Mitchell was named the new head coach of the SMU Mustangs men's lacrosse team on October 28, 2026. Taking the helm as the very first head coach in the program's history, he brings a proven track record from his time as Princeton's offensive coordinator, where he helped guide the Tigers to three Ivy League titles and a national championship.
