= Princeton–Rutgers rivalry =

American college sports rivalry

- Princeton Tigers Rutgers Scarlet Knights
- Sport: Football, basketball, others

Locations of Princeton and Rutgers

The Princeton–Rutgers rivalry is a college rivalry in athletics between the Tigers of Princeton University and Scarlet Knights of Rutgers University–New Brunswick, both of which are located in New Jersey. The rivalry dates back to the first college football game in history in 1869, and even events prior to the first football game, having played baseball and rowed crew against each other prior to the first football game, along with engaging in the Rutgers–Princeton Cannon War. Although the football series ended in 1980 due to the two schools going in different directions with their football programs, the rivalry has continued in other sports, primarily in men's basketball.

== Background ==
Princeton and Rutgers are among the Colonial colleges, the nine institutions of higher education founded in the Thirteen Colonies before the American Revolution. Princeton was founded in 1746 as the College of New Jersey before being renamed Princeton University in 1896. Rutgers was founded in 1766 as Queen's College and became Rutgers College in 1825. Rutgers won land-grant status in 1864 under the Morrill Act.

Because the two schools are nearly 17 miles apart along U.S. Route 1, the rivalry between Princeton and Rutgers is sometimes known as the "Route 1 Rivalry".

== Football ==
Princeton–Rutgers football rivalry
- Princeton Tigers Rutgers Scarlet Knights
- First meeting: November 6, 1869; Rutgers 6, Princeton 4
- Latest meeting: September 27, 1980; Rutgers 44, Princeton 13

Statistics
- Total meetings: 71
- All-time series: Princeton leads, 53–17–1
- Largest victory: Princeton, 82–0 (1888)
- Longest win streak: Princeton, 33 (1869–1937)
- Current win streak: Rutgers, 5 (1976–present)

Rutgers declares itself the "birthplace of college football" in memory of the November 6, 1869, game between Princeton (then the College of New Jersey) and Rutgers, the first college football game ever played. Rutgers won 6–4. However, that game was played using association rules, in contrast to the 1875 game between Harvard and Tufts that is considered to be the first college football game played using modern rules.

From 1869 to 1980, Princeton and Rutgers played each other 71 times, with Princeton leading the all-time series 53–17–1. In this series, 13 games were played at Rutgers and 57 at Princeton.

As Rutgers invested more resources in its football program in the 1970s in hopes of raising its national prominence, Rutgers dropped Princeton from its 1983 schedule to make room for a stronger opponent. For that reason, Princeton Alumni Weekly speculated in 1977 that the Princeton–Rutgers football series could end in the next decade. In January 1979, Princeton and Rutgers announced the end of their football series "at the request of Princeton officials, who felt that Rutgers' step toward big‐time football in recent seasons had taken the Scarlet Knights out of the Tigers' desired class of competition." After the 1981 season, Princeton football and other Ivy League football programs dropped from Division I-A (now FBS) to Division I-AA (now FCS), due to new NCAA attendance and seating capacity requirements that half of Ivy teams could not meet. In contrast, Rutgers remained in Division I-A.

=== Game results ===
Princeton victories	Rutgers victories	Tie games

No.	Date	Location	Winner	Score
1	November 6, 1869	New Brunswick, NJ	Rutgers	6–4
2	November 13, 1869	Princeton, NJ	Princeton	8–0
3	November 19, 1870	Princeton, NJ	Princeton	6–2
4	November 23, 1872	Princeton, NJ	Princeton	4–1
5	November 21, 1874	Princeton, NJ	Princeton	6–0
6	November 2, 1878	Princeton, NJ	Princeton	5–0
7	November 2, 1880	Princeton, NJ	Princeton	8–0
8	October 15, 1881	Princeton, NJ	Princeton	3–0
9	November 10, 1881	New Brunswick, NJ	Princeton	1–0
10	October 14, 1882	New Brunswick, NJ	Princeton	5–0
11	November 14, 1882	New Brunswick, NJ	Princeton	3–0
12	October 17, 1883	Princeton, NJ	Princeton	20–0
13	October 27, 1883	New Brunswick, NJ	Princeton	61–0
14	October 10, 1884	New Brunswick, NJ	Princeton	23–5
15	October 18, 1884	Princeton, NJ	Princeton	35–0
16	October 12, 1887	New Brunswick, NJ	Princeton	30–0
17	October 17, 1888	New Brunswick, NJ	Princeton	80–0
18	October 24, 1888	Princeton, NJ	Princeton	82–0
19	October 8, 1890	Princeton, NJ	Princeton	27–0
20	October 3, 1891	Princeton, NJ	Princeton	12–0
21	October 1, 1892	Princeton, NJ	Princeton	30–0
22	October 10, 1894	Princeton, NJ	Princeton	48–0
23	October 5, 1895	Princeton, NJ	Princeton	22–0
24	October 3, 1896	Princeton, NJ	Princeton	44–0
25	October 6, 1897	Princeton, NJ	Princeton	53–0
26	October 4, 1911	Princeton, NJ	Princeton	37–0
27	October 2, 1912	Princeton, NJ	Princeton	41–6
28	September 27, 1913	Princeton, NJ	Princeton	14–3
29	September 26, 1914	Princeton, NJ	Princeton	12–0
30	October 2, 1915	Princeton, NJ	Princeton	10–0
31	November 25, 1933	Princeton, NJ	Princeton	26–6
32	October 19, 1935	Princeton, NJ	Princeton	29–6
33	October 10, 1936	Princeton, NJ	Princeton	20–0
34	October 23, 1937	Princeton, NJ	Princeton	6–0
35	November 5, 1938	Piscataway, NJ	Rutgers	20–18
36	November 2, 1940	Princeton, NJ	Princeton	28–13

No.	Date	Location	Winner	Score
37	October 27, 1945	Princeton, NJ	Princeton	14–6
38	October 19, 1946	Princeton, NJ	Princeton	14–7
39	October 11, 1947	Piscataway, NJ	Rutgers	13–7
40	October 16, 1948	Princeton, NJ	Rutgers	22–6
41	October 29, 1949	Princeton, NJ	Princeton	34–14
42	October 7, 1950	Princeton, NJ	Princeton	34–28
43	October 4, 1952	Princeton, NJ	#13 Princeton	61–19
44	October 10, 1953	Princeton, NJ	Princeton	9–7
45	September 25, 1954	Princeton, NJ	Princeton	10–8
46	September 24, 1955	Princeton, NJ	Princeton	41–7
47	September 29, 1956	Princeton, NJ	Princeton	28–6
48	September 28, 1957	Princeton, NJ	Princeton	7–0
49	September 27, 1958	Princeton, NJ	Rutgers	28–0
50	September 26, 1959	Princeton, NJ	Rutgers	8–6
51	September 24, 1960	Princeton, NJ	Rutgers	13–8
52	September 30, 1961	Princeton, NJ	Rutgers	16–13
53	September 29, 1962	Princeton, NJ	Princeton	15–7
54	September 28, 1963	Princeton, NJ	Princeton	24–0
55	September 26, 1964	Princeton, NJ	Princeton	10–7
56	September 25, 1965	Princeton, NJ	Princeton	32–6
57	September 24, 1966	Princeton, NJ	Princeton	16–12
58	September 30, 1967	Princeton, NJ	Princeton	22–21
59	September 28, 1968	Princeton, NJ	Rutgers	20–14
60	September 27, 1969	Piscataway, NJ	Rutgers	29–0
61	September 26, 1970	Princeton, NJ	Princeton	41–14
62	September 25, 1971	Princeton, NJ	Rutgers	33–18
63	September 30, 1972	Princeton, NJ	Princeton	7–6
64	September 29, 1973	Princeton, NJ	Rutgers	39–14
65	September 28, 1974	Princeton, NJ	Tie	6–6
66	September 27, 1975	Princeton, NJ	Princeton	10–7
67	September 25, 1976	Princeton, NJ	Rutgers	17–0
68	September 24, 1977	Princeton, NJ	Rutgers	10–6
69	September 30, 1978	East Rutherford, NJ	Rutgers	24–0
70	September 29, 1979	Princeton, NJ	Rutgers	38–14
71	September 27, 1980	Piscataway, NJ	Rutgers	44–13
Series: Princeton leads 53–17–1

== Men's basketball ==
Princeton–Rutgers men's basketball rivalry
- Princeton Tigers Rutgers Scarlet Knights
- First meeting: February 22, 1917; Princeton 36, Rutgers 17
- Latest meeting: December 21, 2024; Princeton 83, Rutgers 82

Statistics
- Total meetings: 122
- All-time series: Princeton leads, 77–45
- Largest victory: Princeton, 101–62 (1958)
- Longest win streak: Princeton, 18 (1954–1964)
- Current win streak: Princeton, 3 (2013–present)

As of the 2016–17 season, Rutgers is Princeton's most-played out-of-conference opponent. In a series dating back to the 1916–17 season and last played in the 2013–14 season, Princeton has a 76–45 series lead.

The Princeton Tigers men's basketball began varsity competition in the 1900–01 season, and the Rutgers Scarlet Knights men's basketball team began competition in basketball in the 1906–07 season as the Queensmen, before the mascot became the Scarlet Knights effective in the 1955–56 season. Their first head-to-head matchup was on February 22, 1917, a 36–17 win for Princeton. The series continued through the 1919–20 season and went on hiatus before resuming for the 1922–23 season then was played annually from the 1926–27 through 1994–95 seasons.

The February 2, 1976, Princeton–Rutgers matchup had an Associated Press 15th-ranked Princeton hosting a fifth-ranked Rutgers in Jadwin Gym. In its recap of the game, The New York Times described the Princeton offense: "Down by only 2 points with 11½ minutes to go, Coach Pete Carril of Princeton ordered a weaving, ballhandling slowdown to kill time and set up perfect shots." In contrast, Rutgers played a more uptempo offense under head coach Tom Young. Then on a 16-game winning streak, Rutgers won 75–62 before a sellout crowd of 7,556, the first sellout at Jadwin in four years.

The two teams would meet again on March 13, 1976, at the Providence Civic Center in Providence, Rhode Island, in the first round of the NCAA Tournament. Down 10 early in the second half, Princeton rallied to pull within 54–53 with four seconds remaining, when Eddie Jordan of Rutgers fouled Princeton reserve guard Pete Molloy. Rutgers coach Tom Young called two timeouts before Molloy attempted the front end of the one-and-one free throws. Molloy missed, and Rutgers guard Mike Dabney grabbed the rebound to secure the 54–53 win. Rutgers advanced to the Final Four round, in which Michigan snapped the Scarlet Knights' 30-game winning streak. Jordan went on to play in the NBA and served as Rutgers head coach from 2013 to 2016.

Due to scheduling problems related to Rutgers moving from the Atlantic 10 Conference to the Big East Conference, the series went on hiatus for the 1995–96 season. The series resumed in the 1996–97 season and continued to be played annually through the 2013–14 season. Princeton beat Rutgers 78–73 at the Louis Brown Athletic Center on December 11, 2013, in a game that The Trentonian dubbed the "battle for New Jersey."

On March 30, 2014, the Home News Tribune reported that Princeton and Rutgers would not play each other in the upcoming season and that Princeton coach Mitch Henderson expressed hope that the series would resume in the near future. The series was also not played in the 2015–16 season.

In 2016, Rutgers hired Steve Pikiell as head coach after firing Jordan. Asbury Park Press columnist Jerry Carino wrote: "There is hope that Rutgers’ hiring of Steve Pikiell...will open the door for Princeton." Carino also added: "As for Rutgers, it’s a bad look for the state university to dodge a century-old rival because they beat you a couple of times." Ultimately, the series was not scheduled in the 2016–17 season. The two schools resumed the rivalry in 2023 in a game played at CURE Insurance Arena in Trenton promoted as the "Jersey Jam."

=== Game results ===
Winning team is shown. Ranking of the team at the time of the game by the AP poll is shown by the team name.

Princeton victories	Rutgers victories	Tie games

No.	Date	Location	Winner	Score
1	February 22, 1917	University Gymnasium	Princeton	36–17
2	February 13, 1918	College Avenue Gymnasium (original)	Princeton	41–14
3	January 17, 1919	University Gymnasium	Princeton	28–21
4	February 7, 1919	College Avenue Gymnasium (original)	Princeton	22–20^{OT}
5	February 11, 1920	College Avenue Gymnasium (original)	Rutgers	31–30^{OT}
6	January 31, 1923	University Gymnasium	Princeton	33–14
7	February 1, 1927	College Avenue Gymnasium (original)	Rutgers	28–27
8	February 15, 1928	University Gymnasium	Rutgers	29–27^{OT}
9	February 27, 1929	University Gymnasium	Princeton	33–26
10	March 8, 1930	University Gymnasium	Rutgers	40–28
11	March 4, 1931	University Gymnasium	Princeton	34–33
12	March 4, 1932	College Avenue Gymnasium	Rutgers	28–26
13	January 4, 1933	College Avenue Gymnasium	Princeton	42–26
14	March 8, 1933	University Gymnasium	Princeton	44–18
15	December 18, 1933	College Avenue Gymnasium	Princeton	37–26
16	January 20, 1934	University Gymnasium	Princeton	41–24
17	December 20, 1934	University Gymnasium	Rutgers	42–25
18	January 3, 1935	College Avenue Gymnasium	Rutgers	37–25
19	December 14, 1935	University Gymnasium	Princeton	32–29
20	February 8, 1936	College Avenue Gymnasium	Rutgers	44–33
21	December 19, 1936	College Avenue Gymnasium	Rutgers	44–35
22	March 10, 1937	University Gymnasium	Rutgers	43–34
23	December 18, 1937	College Avenue Gymnasium	Rutgers	34–33
24	February 19, 1938	University Gymnasium	Princeton	49–41
25	December 16, 1938	University Gymnasium	Rutgers	28–25
26	February 8, 1939	College Avenue Gymnasium	Princeton	44–33
27	December 11, 1939	University Gymnasium	Princeton	30–29
28	February 7, 1940	College Avenue Gymnasium	Princeton	34–26
29	December 20, 1940	College Avenue Gymnasium	Rutgers	43–38
30	February 5, 1941	University Gymnasium	Princeton	42–33
31	December 19, 1941	College Avenue Gymnasium	Princeton	39–36
32	January 10, 1942	University Gymnasium	Princeton	46–28
33	December 16, 1942	College Avenue Gymnasium	Princeton	51–48
34	February 3, 1943	University Gymnasium	Princeton	40–24
35	January 31, 1944	Hobey Baker Memorial Rink	Princeton	37–30
36	December 12, 1945	College Avenue Gymnasium	Princeton	49–40
37	January 9, 1946	Hobey Baker Memorial Rink	Princeton	50–37
38	December 20, 1946	College Avenue Gymnasium	Rutgers	60–40
39	March 12, 1947	Dillon Gymnasium	Princeton	47–39
40	December 19, 1947	College Avenue Gymnasium	Rutgers	65–53
41	January 31, 1948	Dillon Gymnasium	Princeton	63–38
42	December 17, 1948	College Avenue Gymnasium	Rutgers	65–53
43	January 29, 1949	Dillon Gymnasium	Rutgers	48–44
44	December 14, 1949	College Avenue Gymnasium	Rutgers	66–55
45	January 30, 1950	Dillon Gymnasium	Princeton	80–62
46	December 12, 1950	College Avenue Gymnasium	Princeton	57–51
47	January 29, 1951	Dillon Gymnasium	Princeton	73–56
48	December 8, 1951	College Avenue Gymnasium	Princeton	87–65
49	March 4, 1952	Dillon Gymnasium	Princeton	60–52
50	December 19, 1952	College Avenue Gymnasium	Rutgers	83–68
51	March 4, 1953	Dillon Gymnasium	Princeton	74–59
52	December 18, 1953	College Avenue Gymnasium	Rutgers	74–72
53	March 3, 1954	Dillon Gymnasium	Princeton	90–68
54	December 11, 1954	College Avenue Gymnasium	Princeton	92–50
55	February 2, 1955	Dillon Gymnasium	Princeton	75–37
56	December 16, 1955	College Avenue Gymnasium	Princeton	84–67
57	February 1, 1956	Dillon Gymnasium	Princeton	74–40
58	December 19, 1956	College Avenue Gymnasium	Princeton	79–42
59	February 6, 1957	Dillon Gymnasium	Princeton	69–53
60	December 19, 1957	College Avenue Gymnasium	Princeton	80–47
61	February 3, 1958	Dillon Gymnasium	Princeton	101–62
62	December 18, 1958	College Avenue Gymnasium	Princeton	70–47

No.	Date	Location	Winner	Score
63	January 31, 1959	Dillon Gymnasium	Princeton	75–48
64	December 17, 1959	Dillon Gymnasium	Princeton	79–63
65	January 30, 1960	College Avenue Gymnasium	Princeton	94–79^{OT}
66	February 15, 1960	College Avenue Gymnasium	Princeton	94–92^{OT}
67	December 20, 1961	Dillon Gymnasium	Princeton	81–65
68	December 19, 1962	College Avenue Gymnasium	Princeton	84–69
69	December 17, 1963	Dillon Gymnasium	Princeton	79–50
70	December 14, 1964	College Avenue Gymnasium	Princeton	92–79
71	December 13, 1965	Dillon Gymnasium	Rutgers	68–66
72	January 30, 1967	College Avenue Gymnasium	Princeton	97–74
73	February 11, 1967	Dillon Gymnasium	Princeton	83–54
74	December 17, 1968	College Avenue Gymnasium	Rutgers	61–60
75	January 3, 1970	Jadwin Gymnasium	Princeton	75–50
76	January 30, 1971	College Avenue Gymnasium	Princeton	66–58
77	February 1, 1971	Jadwin Gymnasium	Princeton	99–68
78	December 7, 1972	Madison Square Garden	Princeton	51–47
79	December 11, 1973	Jadwin Gymnasium	Rutgers	62–55
80	December 17, 1974	College Avenue Gymnasium	Rutgers	73–67
81	February 2, 1976	Jadwin Gymnasium	Rutgers	75–62
82	March 13, 1976	Providence Civic Center	Rutgers	54–53
83	December 18, 1976	College Avenue Gymnasium	Rutgers	59–54
84	December 17, 1977	Jadwin Gymnasium	Princeton	68–57
85	December 16, 1978	Rutgers Athletic Center	Rutgers	54–51
86	February 5, 1980	Jadwin Gymnasium	Princeton	65–63
87	December 2, 1980	Rutgers Athletic Center	Rutgers	57–47
88	November 30, 1981	Jadwin Gymnasium	Princeton	48–46
89	November 30, 1982	Rutgers Athletic Center	Rutgers	60–55
90	November 29, 1983	Jadwin Gymnasium	Princeton	52–40
91	December 4, 1984	Rutgers Athletic Center	Rutgers	54–41
92	December 23, 1985	Jadwin Gymnasium	Princeton	54–47
93	December 20, 1986	Louis Brown Athletic Center	Princeton	72–68
94	December 5, 1987	Jadwin Gymnasium	Princeton	69–49
95	December 17, 1988	Louis Brown Athletic Center	Rutgers	69–63
96	December 16, 1989	Jadwin Gymnasium	Princeton	65–60
97	December 15, 1990	Louis Brown Athletic Center	Princeton	58–45
98	December 3, 1991	Jadwin Gymnasium	Rutgers	46–41
99	January 5, 1993	Louis Brown Athletic Center	Rutgers	64–47
100	December 7, 1993	Jadwin Gymnasium	Princeton	70–54
101	January 3, 1995	Louis Brown Athletic Center	Princeton	79–70
102	January 6, 1997	Jadwin Gymnasium	Princeton	71–66
103	November 22, 1997	Louis Brown Athletic Center	Princeton	64–52
104	December 22, 1998	Jadwin Gymnasium	Rutgers	60–49
105	December 12, 1999	Louis Brown Athletic Center	Princeton	66–60^{OT}
106	December 14, 2000	Jadwin Gymnasium	Rutgers	46–44
107	December 27, 2000	Madison Square Garden	Rutgers	53–39
108	December 29, 2001	Louis Brown Athletic Center	Rutgers	70–62
109	December 14, 2002	Jadwin Gymnasium	Rutgers	76–70
110	December 13, 2003	Louis Brown Athletic Center	Rutgers	51–49
111	December 8, 2004	Jadwin Gymnasium	Princeton	53–40
112	December 31, 2005	Louis Brown Athletic Center	Rutgers	54–44
113	December 9, 2006	Jadwin Gymnasium	Rutgers	53–47
114	December 1, 2007	Louis Brown Athletic Center	Rutgers	54–50
115	December 10, 2008	Jadwin Gymnasium	Rutgers	49–44
116	December 3, 2009	Louis Brown Athletic Center	Rutgers	58–44
117	November 12, 2010	Jadwin Gymnasium	Princeton	78–73^{OT}
118	December 7, 2011	Louis Brown Athletic Center	Princeton	59–57
119	November 16, 2012	Jadwin Gymnasium	Rutgers	58–52
120	December 11, 2013	Louis Brown Athletic Center	Princeton	78–73
121	November 7, 2023	CURE Insurance Arena	Princeton	68–61
122	December 21, 2024	Prudential Center	Princeton	83–82
Series: Princeton leads 76–46

== Men's lacrosse ==
Princeton–Rutgers lacrosse rivalry
- Princeton Tigers Rutgers Scarlet Knights
- First meeting: May 20, 1922; Princeton 6, Rutgers 1
- Latest meeting: March 7, 2026; Princeton 20, Rutgers 9
- Stadiums: Class of 1952 Stadium and SHI Stadium
- Trophy: Tots Meistrell Cup

Statistics
- Total meetings: 102
- All-time series: Princeton leads, 68–31–3
- Largest victory: Princeton, 17–0 (1942)
- Longest win streak: Princeton, 16 (1990–2004)
- Current win streak: Princeton, 6 (2019–present)

The two schools share a historically significant rivalry in men's lacrosse. The series is the seventh longest continuous intercollegiate lacrosse rivalry in the nation, with 103 meetings through 2024. The programs compete for the Meistrell Cup, named after Hall of Famer Harland (Tots) Meistrell, who helped restart the lacrosse teams at both schools in the 1920s. Princeton had disbanded its team in 1894 before its resumption in 1920, while Rutgers discontinued its program in 1889, before its 1920 revival. Current Tigers head coach Matt Madalon described the consistently exciting nature of the series prior to the 2020 meeting as "The Princeton-Rutgers game has always been a great game, a good rivalry. [We’re] two extremely competitive programs at crucial points in [our] seasons, and we expect another very tight game."

The series began on May 20, 1922, and ended with the Tigers victorious by a 6–1 margin. Princeton would dominate the early years of the rivalry, including a 17–0 pounding of the Scarlet Knights in 1942. In 1981, Rutgers downed the Tigers after four overtime periods, the longest game in Scarlet Knights program history. From the 1960s to late 1980s the series was relatively even, but beginning in 1990, Princeton would win the first of 15 straight meetings as the Tigers dominated the national stage. Princeton won six national championships during this period. The teams would meet in the postseason in 2004, with #6 Princeton defeating the Scarlet Knights by a score of 12 to 4 in the first round of the tournament. In 2005, Rutgers would snap the streak and get revenge for the tourney loss with an 8 to 5 victory. In the past few years, the teams have split the last four games, with the Tigers winning the most recent by a score of 14–8 in 2024. After the 103rd meeting, Princeton leads the annual series by a count of 66–34–3.

=== Game results ===
Princeton rankings are accurate from 2003 to present; Rutgers rankings are accurate from 2015 to present.

Princeton victories	Rutgers victories	Tie games

No.	Date	Location	Winner	Score
1	Unknown 1922	Piscataway, NJ	Princeton	6–1
2	Unknown 1923	Princeton, NJ	Princeton	13–1
3	Unknown 1924	Piscataway, NJ	Princeton	2–1
4	Unknown 1926	Princeton, NJ	Princeton	7–4
5	Unknown 1927	Piscataway, NJ	Princeton	4–3
6	Unknown 1928	Princeton, NJ	Rutgers	5–4
7	Unknown 1929	Princeton, NJ	Princeton	9–1
8	Unknown 1930	Piscataway, NJ	Rutgers	5–1
9	Unknown 1931	Piscataway, NJ	Rutgers	9–2
10	Unknown 1932	Princeton, NJ	Tie	4–4
11	Unknown 1933	Piscataway, NJ	Princeton	4–3
12	Unknown 1934	Princeton, NJ	Princeton	7–5
13	Unknown 1935	Piscataway, NJ	Princeton	4–2
14	Unknown 1936	Princeton, NJ	Princeton	11–6
15	Unknown 1937	Piscataway, NJ	Princeton	8–7
16	Unknown 1938	Princeton, NJ	Princeton	4–2
17	Unknown 1939	Piscataway, NJ	Princeton	10–3
18	Unknown 1940	Princeton, NJ	Princeton	7–1
19	Unknown 1941	Piscataway, NJ	Princeton	9–3
20	Unknown 1942	Princeton, NJ	Princeton	17–0
21	Unknown 1943	Piscataway, NJ	Rutgers	7–5
22	Unknown 1946	Piscataway, NJ	Princeton	18–3
23	Unknown 1947	Piscataway, NJ	Princeton	9–2
24	Unknown 1948	Piscataway, NJ	Princeton	12–1
25	Unknown 1949	Princeton, NJ	Princeton	8–7
26	Unknown 1950	Piscataway, NJ	Princeton	11–6
27	Unknown 1951	Princeton, NJ	Princeton	19–7
28	Unknown 1952	Piscataway, NJ	Princeton	7–5
29	Unknown 1953	Princeton, NJ	Princeton	19–10
30	Unknown 1954	Piscataway, NJ	Princeton	11–9
31	Unknown 1955	Princeton, NJ	Tie	14–14
32	Unknown 1956	Piscataway, NJ	Rutgers	17–11
33	Unknown 1957	Princeton, NJ	Princeton	8–7
34	Unknown 1958	Piscataway, NJ	Rutgers	11–9
35	Unknown 1959	Princeton, NJ	Rutgers	9–6
36	Unknown 1960	Piscataway, NJ	Princeton	9–6
37	Unknown 1961	Princeton, NJ	Princeton	7–5
38	Unknown 1962	Piscataway, NJ	Princeton	13–7
39	Unknown 1963	Princeton, NJ	Princeton	11–7
40	Unknown 1964	Piscataway, NJ	Rutgers	15–10
41	Unknown 1965	Princeton, NJ	Rutgers	10–6
42	Unknown 1966	Piscataway, NJ	Rutgers	11–6
43	Unknown 1967	Princeton, NJ	Tie	5–5
44	Unknown 1968	Piscataway, NJ	Rutgers	5–2
45	Unknown 1969	Piscataway, NJ	Princeton	3–2
46	Unknown 1969	Princeton, NJ	Princeton	15–13
47	Unknown 1970	Piscataway, NJ	Rutgers	11–6
48	Unknown 1971	Princeton, NJ	Rutgers	13–7
49	Unknown 1972	Piscataway, NJ	Rutgers	9–6
50	Unknown 1973	Princeton, NJ	Rutgers	14–6
51	Unknown 1974	Piscataway, NJ	Rutgers	15–12
52	Unknown 1975	Princeton, NJ	Rutgers	13–11

No.	Date	Location	Winner	Score
53	Unknown 1976	Piscataway, NJ	Princeton	16–6
54	Unknown 1977	Princeton, NJ	Princeton	12–7
55	Unknown 1978	Piscataway, NJ	Rutgers	17–8
56	Unknown 1979	Princeton, NJ	Rutgers	16–15
57	Unknown 1980	Piscataway, NJ	Rutgers	16–11
58	Unknown 1981	Princeton, NJ	Rutgers	10–9^{4OT}
59	Unknown 1982	Piscataway, NJ	Rutgers	11–10
60	Unknown 1983	Princeton, NJ	Princeton	17–16
61	Unknown 1984	Piscataway, NJ	Rutgers	18–9
62	Unknown 1985	Princeton, NJ	Rutgers	8–4
63	Unknown 1986	Piscataway, NJ	Rutgers	8–7
64	Unknown 1987	Princeton, NJ	Rutgers	6–4
65	Unknown 1988	Piscataway, NJ	Rutgers	10–5
66	Unknown 1989	Princeton, NJ	Rutgers	10–7
67	Unknown 1990	Piscataway, NJ	Princeton	12–7
68	Unknown 1991	Princeton, NJ	Princeton	9–6
69	Unknown 1992	Piscataway, NJ	Princeton	11–10
70	Unknown 1993	Piscataway, NJ	Princeton	14–7
71	Unknown 1994	Piscataway, NJ	Princeton	15–5
72	Unknown 1995	Princeton, NJ	Princeton	13–9
73	Unknown 1996	Princeton, NJ	Princeton	16–7
74	Unknown 1997	Piscataway, NJ	Princeton	19–8
75	Unknown 1998	Princeton, NJ	Princeton	19–7
76	Unknown 1999	Piscataway, NJ	Princeton	13–3
77	Unknown 2000	Princeton, NJ	Princeton	15–5
78	Unknown 2001	Piscataway, NJ	Princeton	14–5
79	March 26, 2002	Princeton, NJ	Princeton	16–6
80	April 10, 2004	Princeton, NJ	#6 Princeton	9–7
81	May 15–16, 2004	Princeton, NJ	#6 Princeton	12–4
82	April 9, 2005	Piscataway, NJ	Rutgers	8–5
83	April 25, 2006	Princeton, NJ	#7 Princeton	11–5
84	March 13, 2007	Piscataway, NJ	#9 Princeton	15–8
85	March 25, 2008	Princeton, NJ	Princeton	7–6
86	March 24, 2009	Piscataway, NJ	#5 Princeton	13–6
87	April 13, 2010	Princeton, NJ	#5 Princeton	10–8
88	April 12, 2011	Piscataway, NJ	Princeton	11–10
89	April 10, 2012	Princeton, NJ	#15 Princeton	13–4
90	April 9, 2013	Piscataway, NJ	Princeton	13–8
91	April 5, 2014	Princeton, NJ	#17 Princeton	15–11
92	March 17, 2015	Piscataway, NJ	#10 Princeton	12–11
93	March 14, 2016	Princeton, NJ	Princeton	10–7
94	March 15, 2017	Piscataway, NJ	#5 Rutgers	16–11
95	March 10, 2018	Princeton, NJ	Princeton	15–14^{OT}
96	March 9, 2019	Piscataway, NJ	#20 Rutgers	9–8
97	March 7, 2020	Princeton, NJ	#3 Princeton	16–11
98	March 11, 2022	Princeton, NJ	#7 Princeton	16–11
99	March 11, 2023	Piscataway, NJ	#13 Princeton	14–13^{OT}
100	March 10, 2024	Piscataway, NJ	#15 Princeton	14–8
101	March 8, 2025	Princeton, NJ	#4 Princeton	11–5
102	March 7, 2026	Princeton, NJ	#3 Princeton	20–9
Series: Princeton leads 68–31–3

== Other sports ==
Women's basketball

The Princeton Tigers women's basketball team began varsity competition in the 1971–72 season, and the Rutgers Scarlet Knights women's basketball team began varsity competition in the 1974–75 season. The first meeting in women's basketball between Princeton and Rutgers was on December 17, 1974, a 76–60 Rutgers win. Rutgers has a 17–9 lead in the series, which was most recently played on December 10, 2025, with a 81–63 Princeton win in Princeton.

Men's soccer

Princeton has a 29–23–10 lead over Rutgers in men's soccer with Rutgers winning the latest match 3-1 on 8/30/2024. The series dates back to 1942. Princeton has competed in men's soccer since 1909, nearly three decades before Rutgers launched its program in 1938.

Women's soccer

Rutgers has a 19–11–5 lead over Princeton in the all-time series, first played in 1980 and last in 2023.

Princeton hosted Rutgers in the second round of the 2001 College Cup on November 18, 2001; Rutgers won 1–0. Carli Lloyd of Rutgers, a future member of the US national team, scored the lone goal and broke the single-season scoring record for Rutgers. Earlier in the season, Princeton beat Rutgers at Rutgers 2–1 at Yurcak Field on October 2, 2001.

Women's volleyball

As of the 2023 season, Rutgers has a 21–16 series lead over Princeton in women's volleyball, dating back to 1977. Since 2010, Princeton has faced Rutgers five times in the Rutgers Invitational and won the tournament in 2015 and 2016.

Baseball

The first Princeton–Rutgers baseball game was in 1866, with Princeton winning 40–2. Rutgers has a 79–75–3 lead in the all-time series, which was last played on May 1, 2024, when Rutgers won 8–4 at home on Bainton Field.

Softball

Rutgers softball began varsity competition in 1975; Princeton softball began in 1982. Princeton has a 31–25 series lead over Rutgers; the series began in 1985 and was last played in 2022.

Wrestling

The Rutgers-Princeton wrestling rivalry dates back to the Scarlet Knights' first season in 1931. The winner takes home the B1G-Ivy Rivalry Trophy. As of December 8, 2023, Rutgers leads the all-time series 47–34–5.

== See also ==
- List of NCAA college football rivalry games
- Rutgers–Princeton Cannon War
