= Torr Marro =

American lacrosse player

Personal information
- Nationality: American
- Website: NLL webpage

Sport
- Position: midfielder
- NLL teams: New York Saints (1994)
- NCAA team: Princeton University
- Pro career: 1994

Torr J. Marro is a retired lacrosse midfielder who formerly played professional box lacrosse in the Major Indoor Lacrosse League (now the National Lacrosse League). He starred as a member of the Princeton Tigers men's lacrosse team from 1990 through 1993, where he served as team captain and earned Ivy League Rookie of the year honors. In his four-year college career, Princeton won the school's first NCAA tournament Championship, two Ivy League Championships and earned the school's first four NCAA Men's Lacrosse Championship tournament invitations.

== College career ==
Marro earned the 1990 Men's Ivy League Rookie of the Year award, helping the team to the 1990 NCAA Division I Men's Lacrosse Championship tournament, which was its first NCAA tournament. Princeton went on to win the 1992 NCAA Division I Men's Lacrosse Championship tournament, its first NCAA national championship. During his four years, Princeton earned its first four births in the NCAA Men's Lacrosse Championship. The 1992 and 1993 teams were undefeated 6–0 outright Ivy League champions. He served as co-captain of the 1993 team.

== Professional career ==
Marro played for the New York Saints during the 1994 Major Indoor Lacrosse League season.

== Notes ==
| Preceded by Darren Lowe | Men's Lacrosse Ivy League Rookie of the Year; 1990 | Succeeded by Scott Bacigalupo |
