= B. J. Prager =

Lacrosse player

Personal information
- Nationality: American
- Website: MLL webpage

Sport
- Position: Attackman
- NLL draft: 70th overall, 2002; Vancouver Ravens
- MLL teams: Bridgeport Barrage (2002–2003); Philadelphia Barrage (2004–2006)
- NCAA team: Princeton University
- Pro career: 2002–2006

Career highlights
- College highlights: Men's Ivy League Rookie of the Year (1999); All-American 3x (3rd team: 2000 & 2002; honorable mention: 2001); All-Ivy League (1st team: 1999, 2000 & 2002; 2nd team: 2001); NCAA Men's Lacrosse Championship (2001); NCAA Men's Lacrosse Championship Most Outstanding Player (2001); Records: Princeton freshman year goals (25, 1999–2010); Professional highlights: Major League Lacrosse Steinfeld Cup Champions (2004 & 2006)

William J. "B. J." Prager is a retired professional lacrosse attackman who played professional field lacrosse in the Major League Lacrosse (MLL). He starred as a member of the Princeton Tigers men's lacrosse team from 1999 through 2002, where he was Ivy League rookie of the year, a three-time United States Intercollegiate Lacrosse Association (USILA) All-American (twice third-team, once honorable mention), a four-time All-Ivy League selection (three-time first team), a team captain and an NCAA Tournament Most Outstanding Player of a national champion team. For over a decade, he held the freshman goal scoring record at Princeton.

During his time at Princeton, the team qualified for the NCAA Men's Lacrosse Championship all four years, reached the championship game three times, won the championship game once and won four Ivy League championships. In his career, he has scored game-winning overtime goals in both state high school and national collegiate championship games as well as participated on two championship MLL teams.

== Background ==
Prager is from Garden City, New York on Long Island. He began playing lacrosse in fifth grade and continued through to high school. He led Garden City High School to an undefeated 21–0 season culminating on his overtime game-winning goal in the 1997 New York State Public High School Athletic Association Class B Lacrosse Championship. In 1996, the team had a 13–0–1 streak that included the Nassau County and Long Island Championships. During his high school career, he scored 154 goals.

== College career ==
Prager attended Princeton where he earned the 1999 Men's Ivy League Rookie of the Year and the 2001 NCAA Division I Men's Lacrosse Championship tournament Most Outstanding Player. His 25 goals as a freshman in 1999 was a Princeton freshman record. In 2010, Ivy League Rookie of the Year Mike Chanenchuk totaled 28 as a Princeton freshman to surpass Prager's record. He served as co-captain of the 2002 team.

During his four years at university, Princeton won the Ivy League Conference outright each year, achieving undefeated 6–0 records in 1999–2001 and having a 5–1 record in 2002. In both 2000 and 2002, he was a third team USILA All-American Team selection, while he was an honorable mention in 2001. He was a first team All-Ivy League selection in 1999, 2000 & 2002 and a second team selection in 2001. He was a 2002 USILA Scholar All-American.

In 2000, Prager tore his anterior cruciate ligament while he was the leading scorer with 23 goals in his first 8+ games and was lost for the remainder of the season. In the 2001 NCAA championship semifinals, Prager scored three goals against Towson State in a 12–11 victory. In the finals, he scored a total of four goals, including the game-winning goal in overtime with an assist from Ryan Boyle as well as the ninth goal in the 10–9 victory over Syracuse. In the 2002 NCAA Division I Men's Lacrosse Championship semifinals, he scored five goals in an 11–9 victory over Johns Hopkins, but in the 13–12 finals loss, Syracuse defenseman Solomon Bliss held him to one goal.

== Professional career ==
After graduating, Prager worked for Lehman Brothers in an analyst training program. He played with the Bridgeport Barrage during the 2002 and 2003 MLL seasons and then the Philadelphia Barrage from 2004 to 2006. On July 19, 2003, Prager scored five goals in a 22–17 victory against the Baltimore Bayhawks. The Barrage won the Steinfeld Cup in both 2004 and 2006. In 2006, he scored the goal that ended the Denver Outlaws' last lead possession of the game. He was second in the league in power play goals in 2004 and led both the 2004 and 2006 teams in shooting percentage. After retiring from professional play, Prager represented the New York Athletic Club.

== Personal ==
His father is Bill Prager. Prager is from a family of competitive lacrosse players: His younger brother, Matt, who was in the class of 2005, played at Princeton. The 2002 season was the first time the two of them played on the same organized team. Another brother, Pat, played lacrosse at C.W. Post.

== Statistics ==
=== Princeton University ===
Season	GP	G	A	Pts	PPG
1999	13	25	--	--	--
2000	8	23	4	27	--
2001	15	36	4	40	--
2002	15	34	2	36	--
Totals	51	118	--	--	--

=== MLL ===
The following are his MLL career stats:

		Regular Season							Playoffs
Season	Team	GP	G	2ptG	A	Pts	LB	PIM	GP	G	2ptG	A	Pts	LB	PIM
2002	Bridgeport	8	9	0	1	10	7	0.5	—	—	—	—	—	—	—
2003	Bridgeport	11	13	0	1	14	5	3	—	—	—	—	—	—	—
2004	Philadelphia	11	16	0	0	16	4	2.5	2	4	0	1	5	1	0
2005	Philadelphia	11	27	0	3	30	13	2.5	—	—	—	—	—	—	—
2006	Philadelphia	10	22	0	7	29	10	1.5	2	3	0	1	4	3	0
MLL Totals		51	87	0	12	99	39	10	4	7	0	2	9	4	0

Preceded by Liam Banks	NCAA Men's Lacrosse Championship Tournament Most Outstanding Player; 2001	Succeeded by Mike Powell
Preceded by Keith Cynar	Men's Lacrosse Ivy League Rookie of the Year; 2000	Succeeded by Matt Primm
