= 2015 Ivy League men's lacrosse tournament =

American college lacrosse tournament

The 2015 Ivy League Men's Lacrosse Tournament took place May 1 to May 3 at Stevenson Field in Providence, Rhode Island. Yale defeated Princeton to win the tournament and received the Ivy League's automatic bid to the 2015 NCAA Division I Men's Lacrosse Championship.

== Standings ==
The top four teams in the Ivy League after the regular season advance to the Ivy League Conference Tournament. Brown, Cornell, and Princeton finished the regular season with identical 4-2 records and share the league title. Tiebreakers only apply to tournament seeding. The winner of the tournament only receives the league's automatic bid to the NCAA tournament. League champion is determined only by regular season results.

Seed	School	Conference	Overall	Tiebreaker
1	Brown‡*	4-2	12-4	2-0 vs. Cornell and Princeton
2	Cornell‡*	4–2	10–5	1-0 vs. Princeton and 0-1 vs. Brown
3	Princeton‡*	4–2	9-6	0-2 vs. Cornell and Brown
4	Yale*	3–3	11–4	1-0 Penn
5	Penn	3–3	6–7	0-1 vs. Yale
6	Harvard	2-4	7–7	
7	Dartmouth	1-5	5-8	
‡ Ivy League champions. * Qualify for the tournament.

== Schedule ==
Session	Game	Time*	Matchup^{#}	Score	Television
Semi-finals – Friday, May 1
1	1	5:00 pm	#2 Cornell vs. #3 Princeton	10-11	ESPN 3
1	2	8:00 pm	#1 Brown vs. #4 Yale	6-10	ESPN 3
Championship – Saturday, May 3
2	3	12:00pm	#3 Princeton vs. #4 Yale	10-11	ESPN U
*Game times in EST. #-Rankings denote tournament seeding.

== All-Tournament ==
Matt Donovan, Cornell

Conrad Oberbeck, Yale

Larken Kemp, Brown

Ben Reeves, Yale

Kip Orban, Princeton

Mike McDonald, Princeton

Zach Currier, Princeton

Mchael Quinn, Yale

Gavin McBride, Princeton

Eric Natale, Yale

Most Outstanding Conrad Oberbeck, Yale
