= Jacksonville Dolphins men's lacrosse =

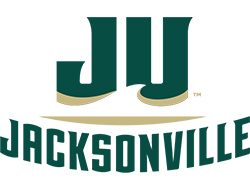
- University: Jacksonville University
- Head coach: John Galloway
- Stadium: D. B. Milne Field (capacity: 5,000)
- Location: Jacksonville, Florida
- Conference: ASUN Conference
- Colors: Green and white

NCAA Tournament appearances
- 2026

Conference Tournament championships
- 2026

Conference regular season championships
- 2022

The Jacksonville Dolphins men's lacrosse team is a college lacrosse team that represents Jacksonville University in Jacksonville, Florida, United States. As of the upcoming 2023 season, the Dolphins compete in JU's full-time home of the ASUN Conference. The men's lacrosse team had been an associate member of the Southern Conference (SoCon) in the 2022 season under the terms of an agreement between the ASUN and SoCon made when the ASUN relaunched its men's lacrosse league in that season. However, a conference realignment triggered by the Atlantic 10 Conference's announcement that it would sponsor men's lacrosse starting in the 2023 season led to the SoCon dropping the sport. Following the 2022 season, Jacksonville returned men's lacrosse to the ASUN.

== History ==
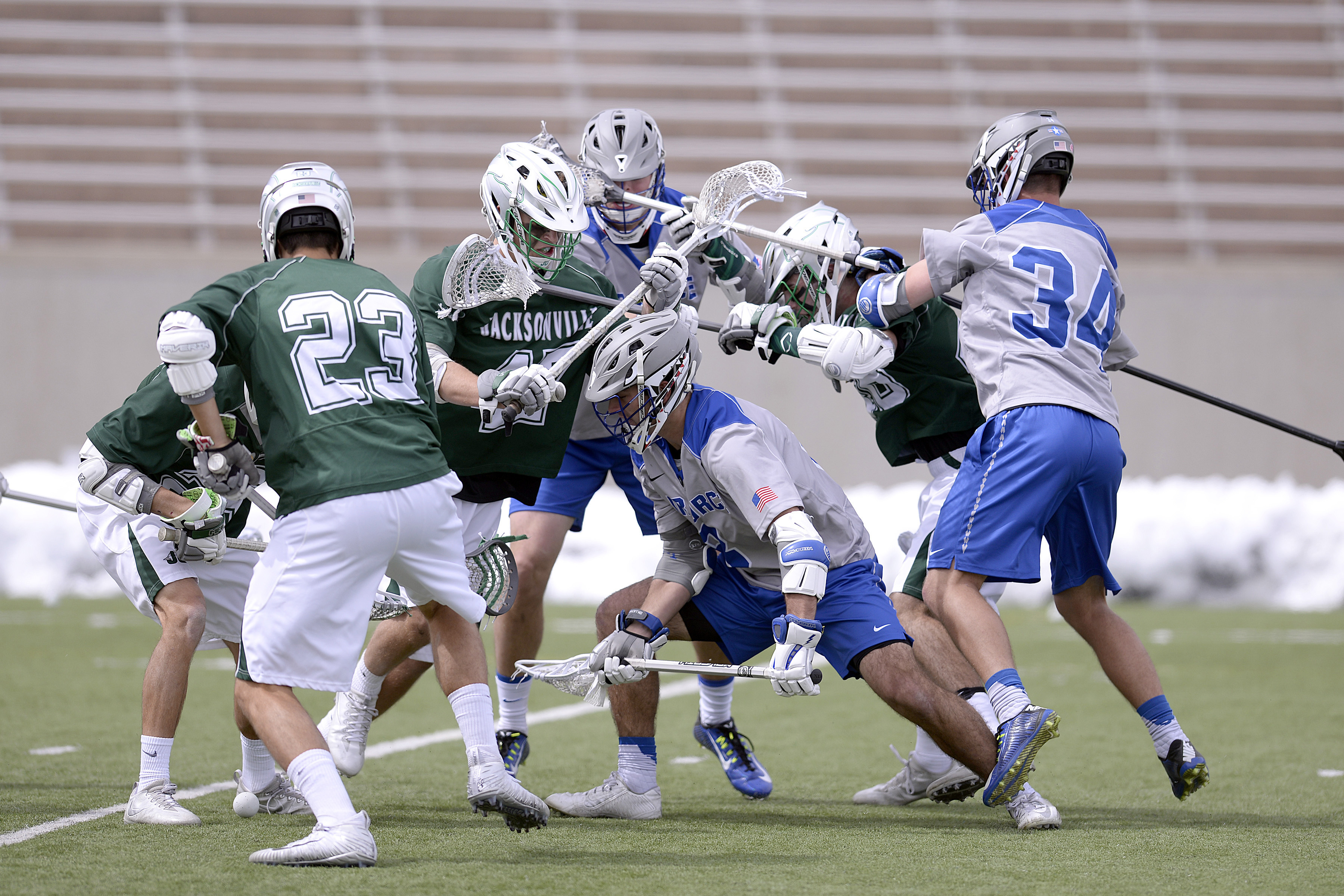
Jacksonville takes on Air Force during a 2017 game

=== Conference affiliations ===
- Independent (2010)
- Metro Atlantic Athletic Conference (2011–2013)
- ASUN Conference (Note: Then known as the Atlantic Sun Conference.) (2014)
- Southern Conference (2015–2022)
- Atlantic Sun Conference (2023–present)

=== Year by year results ===
Season	Coach	Overall	Conference	Standing	Postseason
2010	Matt Kerwick	5–8	n/a		
2011	Matt Kerwick	5–10	3–3	4th	
2012	Guy Van Arsdale	6–7	3–3	2nd	
2013	Guy Van Arsdale	8–5	5–1	2nd	
2014	Guy Van Arsdale	4–9	3–2	3rd	
2015	Guy Van Arsdale	4–8	1–5	6th	
2016	Guy Van Arsdale	3–10	1–6	7th	
2017	John Galloway	3–11	3–4	5th	
2018	John Galloway	8–7	5–2	3rd	
2019	John Galloway	6–9	5–2	4th	
2020	John Galloway	3–3	n/a		
2021	John Galloway	7–7	4–2	3rd	
2022	John Galloway	14–3	5–0	1st	
2023	John Galloway	12–4	7–2	T–2nd	
2024	John Galloway	13–5	8–1	T–1st	
2025	John Galloway	9–5	4–1	T–1st	
2026	John Galloway	10–5	4–1	T–1st	2026 NCAA Division I men's lacrosse tournament

=== All-time coaching records ===
Head coach	Years	Win–loss–tie	Pct.
Matt Kerwick	2010–2011	10–18	.357
Guy Van Arsdale	2012–2016	25–39	.391
John Galloway	2017–present	85–59	.590
