= Matt Madalon =

American college lacrosse coach and former player

Current position
- Title: Head coach
- Team: Princeton Tigers

Biographical details
- Education: Hofstra; Roanoke

Playing career
- 2007: San Francisco Dragons
- 2010–2012: Long Island Lizards

Coaching career (HC unless noted)
- 2007–2011: Stevens Tech (assistant)
- 2011–2014: Stevens Tech (associate HC)
- 2014–2016: Princeton (offensive coordinator/recruiting coordinator)
- 2016–present: Princeton

Matt Madalon is an American college lacrosse coach and former player. He is currently the head coach of the Princeton Tigers men's lacrosse team. He played professionally in Major League Lacrosse.

== Playing career ==
Madalon began his collegiate playing career at Hofstra (2002–2003) before transferring and playing at Roanoke for three seasons.

He went on to play professional lacrosse for the San Francisco Dragons and Long Island Lizards in Major League Lacrosse.

== Coaching career ==
Madalon spent seven years on the coaching staff at Stevens Institute of Technology, an NCAA Division III program and the last three years as an associate head coach. He joined Stevens in August 2007 as an assistant coach.

Prior to becoming head coach, Madalon served as an offensive coordinator and recruiting coordinator for the Princeton Tigers men's lacrosse team.

Madalon took over as head coach of Princeton during the 2016 season. Since taking over as head coach, he has led the team to two Final Four appearances, three quarterfinals appearances, and multiple Ivy League tournament titles and NCAA tournament appearances. In 2026, Madalon would lead Princeton to their first national championship since 2001. They would win 16–9 over Notre Dame to win their seventh national title.
