= 2013 Ivy League Men's Lacrosse Tournament =

The 2013 Ivy League men's lacrosse tournament took place May 3 to May 5 at Schoellkopf Field in Ithaca, New York. The winner of the tournament received the Ivy League 's automatic bid to the 2013 NCAA Division I Men's Lacrosse Championship. Four teams from the Ivy League conference competed in the single elimination tournament. The seeds were based upon the teams' regular season conference record.

== Standings ==
Only the top four teams in the Ivy League conference advanced to the Ivy League Conference Tournament.

Seed	School	Conference	Overall	Tiebreaker
1	Cornell‡*	6–0	14–4	
2	Yale*	4–2	12–5	
3	Penn*	3–3	8–5	1-0 vs. Princeton
4	Princeton*	3–3	7-6	0-1 vs. Penn
5	Brown	2-4	8-6	
6	Harvard	2-4	6–8	
7	Dartmouth	2-4	3-11	
‡ Ivy League regular season champions. * Qualify for the tournament.

== Schedule ==
Session	Game	Time*	Matchup^{#}	Score	Television
Semi-finals – Friday, May 3
1	1	5:00 pm	#2 Yale vs. #3 Penn	9-6	ESPN 3
1	2	8:00 pm	#1 Cornell vs. #4 Princeton	13-14	ESPN 3
Championship – Sunday, May 4
2	3	11:00am	#2 Yale vs. #4 Princeton	12-8	ESPN U
*Game times in EST. #-Rankings denote tournament seeding.

== Bracket ==
Schoellkopf Field - Ithaca, New York

Semifinals; May 3
1	Cornell	13
4	Princeton	14*
2	Yale	9
3	Penn	6

Championship Game; May 5
4	Princeton	8
2	Yale	12

- denotes an overtime game
