= Ryan Boyle =

American lacrosse player

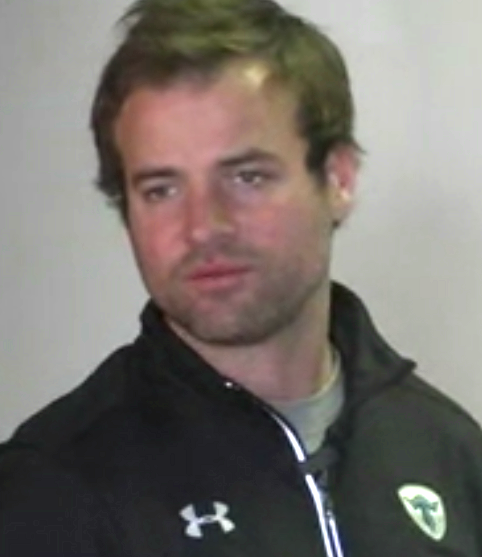

Personal information
- Nicknames: Ripp, Bro
- Nationality: American
- Born: November 22, 1981 (age 44) Hunt Valley, Maryland, U.S.
- Height: 5 ft 11 in (180 cm)
- Weight: 180 lb (82 kg; 12 st 12 lb)
- Website: NLL website

Sport
- Position: Attack
- Shoots: Right
- NLL draft: 3rd overall, 2004; San Jose Stealth
- NLL teams: San Jose Stealth (2005–2006); New York Titans (2007–2009); Orlando Titans (2010); Philadelphia Wings (2011)
- MLL team Former teams: Boston Cannons (2009–2014); Philadelphia Barrage (2004–2008)
- NCAA team: Princeton University
- Pro career: 2004–

Career highlights
- College highlights: Men's Ivy League Rookie of the Year (2001); Men's Ivy League Player of the Year (2002 & 2004); All-American 4x (1st team: 2003 & 2004; 2nd team: 2002; 3rd team: 2001); USILA Scholar All-American (2004); All-Ivy League (1st team: 2002, 2003 & 2004; 2nd team: 2001); NCAA Men's Lacrosse Championship (2001); Records: Major League Lacrosse Rookie points (45, 2004–present); Princeton single-season assists (48, 2003–present); Ivy League single-season assists (32, 2003–present); Ivy League career points (120, 2004–present); Ivy League career assists (84, 2004–present); MIAA single-season pass completion percentage (78%, 1998–present); Professional highlights: Major League Lacrosse Rookie of the Year (2004); Major League Lacrosse All-Star 5x; Major League Lacrosse Steinfeld Cup Champions (2004, 2006 & 2007); National Lacrosse League Rookie of the Year (2005); National Lacrosse League All-Star (2005 & 2007)

Ryan Boyle
Medal record

Representing United States

Lacrosse

World Lacrosse Championship
Gold medal – first place	2002 Perth	Field lacrosse
Silver medal – second place	2006 London (Ontario)	Field lacrosse
Gold medal – first place	2010 Manchester	Field lacrosse

Ryan J. Boyle (born November 22, 1981, in Hunt Valley, Maryland) is a former lacrosse player who last played professional field lacrosse for the Boston Cannons of Major League Lacrosse (MLL). He most recently played professional box lacrosse for the Philadelphia Wings of the National Lacrosse League (NLL) until his release in 2011. Boyle starred in both lacrosse and American football for Gilman School from 1996 to 2000. He starred as a member of the Princeton Tigers men's lacrosse team from 2001 through 2004. Boyle was also a member of the Men's Lacrosse Team USA for the 2002, 2006 and 2010 World Lacrosse Championships.

At Gilman, he was an All-American lacrosse player who was named All-city four times and All-metro three times (Player of the Year once), leading his team to two championships. He was a two-time All-metro quarterback who led his school through two consecutive undefeated championship seasons and set a Maryland Interscholastic Athletic Association record for pass completion percentage.

During his time at Princeton University, the team qualified for the NCAA Men's Lacrosse Championship all four years, reached the championship game twice, won the championship game once and won four Ivy League championships. He was a four-time All-American (twice first team) and four-time All-Ivy League selection (first team three times and second team once). He was Ivy League Player of the Year twice and Ivy League Rookie of the Year. He established numerous Ivy League records and won numerous NCAA statistical championships during his career. In addition to his All-American recognitions from the United States Intercollegiate Lacrosse Association (USILA), he was recognized by USILA as a Scholar All-American.

As a professional, he has earned four MLL championships, and has been rookie of the year in both the MLL and NLL. He has participated in five MLL All-Star games and two NLL All-star games. He is also a three-time Team USA representative and two-time gold medalist at the World Lacrosse Championship.

== High school career ==
Boyle is from Hunt Valley, Maryland. Some of his early lacrosse experiences were at the Cockeysville Rec program. He attended high school at the prestigious Gilman School in Baltimore, graduating in 2000. Boyle was the number one boys' lacrosse recruit in the nation as a senior. The Baltimore Sun selected him as their boys' lacrosse player of the year on the 2000 All-Metro boys' lacrosse team as well as the 2000 All-Baltimore City/County boys' lacrosse team. Boyle was a three-time All-Metro (1998, 1999, and 2000), four-time All-City (first team: 1998, 1999, and 2000; second team: 1997) attackman in lacrosse and two-time All-Metro quarterback in football (1998 and 1999). He led the lacrosse team to two Maryland Interscholastic Athletic Association A Conference championships in lacrosse (1998 and 2000) and two in football (1998 and 1999) including a 21–0 undefeated streak, while carrying a 4.0 grade point average. As a starting quarterback, his record was 26–2. Boyle, who started calling his own plays as a junior, amassed career totals of 3,593 passing yards and 2,051 rushing yards. In lacrosse he totaled 258 points. Boyle also played basketball in high school and was co-winner of the Greater Baltimore Chapter National Football Foundation Hall of Fame scholar athlete award as a senior. Boyle intended to play both football and lacrosse at Princeton.

As a sophomore option offense quarterback, he totaled 812 yards and five touchdowns rushing as well as 465 yards and four touchdowns passing. As a junior, he set the Maryland state high school single-season pass completion percentage record of 78 percent (surpassing 69.4 established by Ryan Fleetwood of Cambridge) on 117 of 150 passing for 1,908 yards and 20 touchdowns in addition to rushing for 535 yards and five touchdowns. As a senior, he went 76-for-107 passing (71 percent) for 1,220 yards and 14 touchdowns and 704 yards rushing with eight touchdowns as a senior. In the 1999 championship game 42–10 victory over McDonogh High School to cap a 10–0 season, Boyle rushed for 100 yards and completed 14 of 20 passes for 146 yards.

In lacrosse, as a freshman he made the second team of the 1997 All-Baltimore City/County boys' lacrosse team. As a sophomore, he was All-Metro with 47 goals, 41 assists and 53 ground balls. in the 1998 championship game 16–12 victory over St. Paul's High School, he scored four goals and had an assist. As a junior, he totaled 23 goals and 28 assists to go with 60 ground balls, even though he missed three games for a surgical procedure. The surgical procedure removed a hernia. He was voted All-American as a junior. He totaled 36 goals and 44 assists as a senior in 2000. In the 2000 lacrosse championship game, he had four goals and assist in the 10–8 victory over Boys' Latin School of Maryland.

== College career ==
He attended college at Princeton University, graduating in 2004 where he was a four-time All-American, including being named First Team Attack twice. Ryan led the Tigers to three NCAA Final Four appearances, two National title games and a National Championship in 2001. He finished his career with 70 goals and 162 assists good for 232 total points.

He was a first team USILA All-American Team selection in 2003 and 2004, a second team selection in 2002 and a third team selection in 2001. He was also first team All-Ivy League in 2002, 2003 and 2004 and a second team selection in 2001. He was the Ivy League Rookie of the Year in 2001 and the Ivy League Player of the Year in 2002 and 2004. He was the second player to be named Rookie of the Year as a freshman and Player of the Year as a sophomore. He was one of five finalists for the Tewaaraton Trophy in 2004. He was a 2004 USILA Scholar All-American.

Princeton earned NCAA Men's Lacrosse Championship invitations each year of Boyle's four-year career and won the 2001 NCAA Division I Men's Lacrosse Championship tournament. They were Ivy League champion or co-champion each year of his career: The 2001 team was 6–0 undefeated outright champions; the 2002 team was 5–1 outright champions; the 2003 and 2004 teams were 5–1 co-champions.

The arrival of freshman Boyle necessitated that senior Matt Striebel move from attack to midfield and the demotion of head coach Bill Tierney's son, Brendan, to the bench. Striebel had previously orchestrated the Princeton offense from behind the goal and both players had started in the 2000 NCAA Division I Men's Lacrosse Championship game, but on March 25, 2001, which was the first practice after the team lost 14–8 to Syracuse, Tierney made the switch. Striebel and Boyle would later earn two golds medals and a silver medal together in World Lacrosse Championship play and three MLL Steinfeld Cups together with the Philadelphia Barrage.

In the 2001 game against Dartmouth to clinch the Ivy League championship, he scored three goals and had two assists as part of a 14-point 3-game stretch. In the 2001 NCAA championship tournament quarterfinal 8–7 victory over Loyola, he had three assists including two that broke a 4–4 tie in the second half. He added two assists in the semifinal 12–11 victory over Towson State. In the 2001 NCAA championship game, Boyle assisted on B. J. Prager's overtime game-winning goal against Syracuse from behind the net. It was one of a game-high three assists for Boyle in the 10–9 victory.

In the 2002 NCAA Division I Men's Lacrosse Championship tournament, he scored the game-winning goal in the quarterfinal game against Georgetown with four seconds left in regulation time. The goal came on a broken play after the designed play from the time-out with 13 seconds left did not work. On the day Boyle had two goals and three assists in the 14–13 victory. He added three assists in the semifinal 11–9 victory over Johns Hopkins. In the championship game against Syracuse, he scored two goals in the first quarter but was held scoreless for the rest of the 13–12 loss.

Boyle's 2003 tournament performances were not notable. In the 2004 victory over Brown to earn a share of the Ivy League championship, he had four assists. In the 2004 NCAA Division I Men's Lacrosse Championship tournament opening round, he scored a career-high four goals as Princeton defeated Rutgers 12–4. In the quarterfinals, he had two late goals and assisted on Peter Trombino's overtime game-winning goal against Maryland. He then had a goal (to tie the score at 5) and three assists in the 8–7 semifinals loss to Navy. He made the All-tournament team.

Boyle holds several Ivy League conference records: single-season assists (32, 2003), career assists (86, 2001–04) and career points (120, 2001–04). Note that the Ivy League records are for conference games only. Boyle (2003) tied Jon Hess (1997) for the Princeton single-season assists record with 48. He was also an NCAA national statistical champion in several statistics: points per game (2003, 4.54), assists per game (2003, 3.77), assists per game (2004, 2.93), assists (2003, 49), assists (2004, 44).

== Professional career ==
=== NLL ===
Boyle played box lacrosse in the NLL for the San Jose Stealth (2005–2006), New York Titans (2007–2009), and Orlando Titans (2010). He has also played field lacrosse in the MLL for the Philadelphia Barrage (2004–2008) and Boston Cannons (2009–present). Boyle was selected 3rd overall by the Stealth in the 2004 National Lacrosse League entry draft. In 2005, he was named NLL Rookie of the Year. He won the rookie scoring title. He participated in the 2005 and 2007 National Lacrosse League All-Star Games. In the January 20, 2007, first box lacrosse game played at Madison Square Garden, he scored two goals and two assists, but made more news off the field when he was photographed signing autographs for Cody Lohan and his picture appeared on Perez Hilton's blog. He was picked 8th in the 2010 Orlando Titans dispersal draft by the Philadelphia Wings. Boyle also played box lacrosse in the National Lacrosse League (NLL) for seven years before being released by the Philadelphia Wings in 2011.

=== MLL ===
Boyle was named 2004 Major League Lacrosse Rookie of the Year, and he has helped lead the Philadelphia Barrage to win MLL Steinfeld Cup Championships in 2004, 2006, and 2007. In the 2004 championship game against the Boston Cannons, he helped break a 6–6 tie with one of the goals giving Philadelphia an 8–6 halftime lead on the way to their 13–11 victory. In the 2006 MLL championship game, he assisted on an early goal by Justin Smith. He has made other MLL playoff appearances. In the 2008 MLL semifinals, Boyle scored two goals and had three assists in the Philadelphia Barrage 16–15 overtime loss to the Rochester Rattlers. In the 2010 MLL semifinals, Boyle scored two goals for the Boston Cannons in the 13–9 loss to the Chesapeake Bayhawks. The following season, he helped lead the Cannons to their first league championship, while earning his fourth.

Boyle has appeared in five MLL All-Star games. During the 2006 Major League Lacrosse All-Star Game weekend, Boyle won the skills competition for accuracy and then scored two goals and an assist for Team USA in the All-Star game. He was joined by Striebel on the team in 2007. In the 2010 All-Star game, he had four goals for Team USA.

=== International ===
Boyle has been named to Team USA for the World Lacrosse Championship in 2002, 2006 and 2010. The team won gold medals in 2002 and 2010 and a silver in 2006. In 2002, Boyle scored 23 points (14 goals and 9 assists), including two goals against Team Canada in the championship game and a hat trick in a qualification game against them. He also had a hat trick against the Iroquois Nation in a qualification game. He then had a goal and three assists against them in the semifinals. In 2006, he totaled five goals and eleven assists.

=== Other ===
Ryan's passion for lacrosse and youth education is exemplified by his involvement with Trilogy Lacrosse a leader in lacrosse education. He runs lacrosse camps through Trilogy as do many other successful Lacrosse players and coaches through their own various companies.

== Personal ==
Boyle is from a self-described middle-class family with six children. Boyle's father, Darby, played attack for West Point men's lacrosse in the late 1960s and his older brother Michael played lacrosse for Georgetown.

== Statistics ==
=== NLL ===
		Regular Season						Playoffs
Season	Team	GP	G	A	Pts	LB	PIM	GP	G	A	Pts	LB	PIM
2005	San Jose	16	22	42	64	95	12	--	--	--	--	--	--
2006	San Jose	16	16	28	44	46	4	--	--	--	--	--	--
2007	New York	16	29	53	82	77	11	--	--	--	--	--	--
2008	New York	16	17	45	62	65	4	2	0	9	9	9	0
2009	New York	16	14	40	54	70	4	3	4	7	11	20	0
2010	Orlando	16	21	39	60	40	2	2	0	5	5	3	0
2011	Philadelphia	16	12	31	43	45	0	--	--	--	--	--	--
NLL totals		112	131	278	409	438	37	7	4	21	25	32	0

=== MLL ===
		Regular Season							Playoffs
Season	Team	GP	G	2ptG	A	Pts	LB	PIM	GP	G	2ptG	A	Pts	LB	PIM
2004	Philadelphia	8	17	0	28	45	--	0	--	--	--	--	--	--	--
2005	Philadelphia	12	28	0	24	52	22	0	--	--	--	--	--	--	--
2006	Philadelphia	7	17	0	25	42	17	0	2	2	0	5	7	1	0
2007	Philadelphia	12	26	1	31	58	26	2	2	3	0	4	7	3	1
2008	Barrage	12	21	1	22	44	28	1	1	2	0	3	5	2	0
2009	Boston	9	12	0	23	35	17	2.5	1	2	0	1	3	1	0
MLL Totals		60	121	2	163	170	110	5.5	6	9	0	18	22	7	0

=== Princeton University ===
	Regular Season
Season	GP	G	A	Pts	PPG
2004	15	23	44	67	--
2003	13	10	49	59	--
2002	15	22	31	53	--
2001	15	16	37	53	--
Totals	58	71	161	232	--

Preceded by Taylor Wray	NLL Rookie of the Year; 2005	Succeeded by Brodie Merrill
Preceded by Adam Doneger	MLL Rookie of the Year; 2004	Succeeded by Brodie Merrill
Preceded by Conor Gill	MLL Rookie assists record 2004	Succeeded by incumbent
Preceded by Conor Gill	MLL Rookie points record 2004	Succeeded by incumbent
Preceded by Ryan Mollett; Ruan McClay	Ivy League Men's Lacrosse Player of the Year; 2002; 2004	Succeeded by Ruan McClay; Sean Greenhalgh
Preceded by Matt Primm	Ivy League Men's Lacrosse Rookie of the Year; 2001	Succeeded by Sean Greenhalgh
Preceded by ?	Ivy League Career points 2004–present	Succeeded by incumbent
Preceded by ?	Ivy League Career assists 2004–present	Succeeded by incumbent
Preceded by ?	Ivy League Single-season assists 2003–present	Succeeded by incumbent
Preceded by Michael Powell	NCAA points per game leader 2003 with Andrew Collins	Succeeded by Chris Cara
Preceded by Tim Pearson	NCAA assists per game leader 2003, 2004	Succeeded by Chris Cara
Preceded by Tim Pearson, Conor Gill, Kyle Ojakian, Michael Powell	NCAA assists 2003, 2004	Succeeded by Matt Danowski
Preceded by Ryan Fleetwood	MIAA single-season pass completion percentage 1998	Succeeded by incumbent
