= Class of 1952 Stadium =

Stadium in Princeton, New Jersey

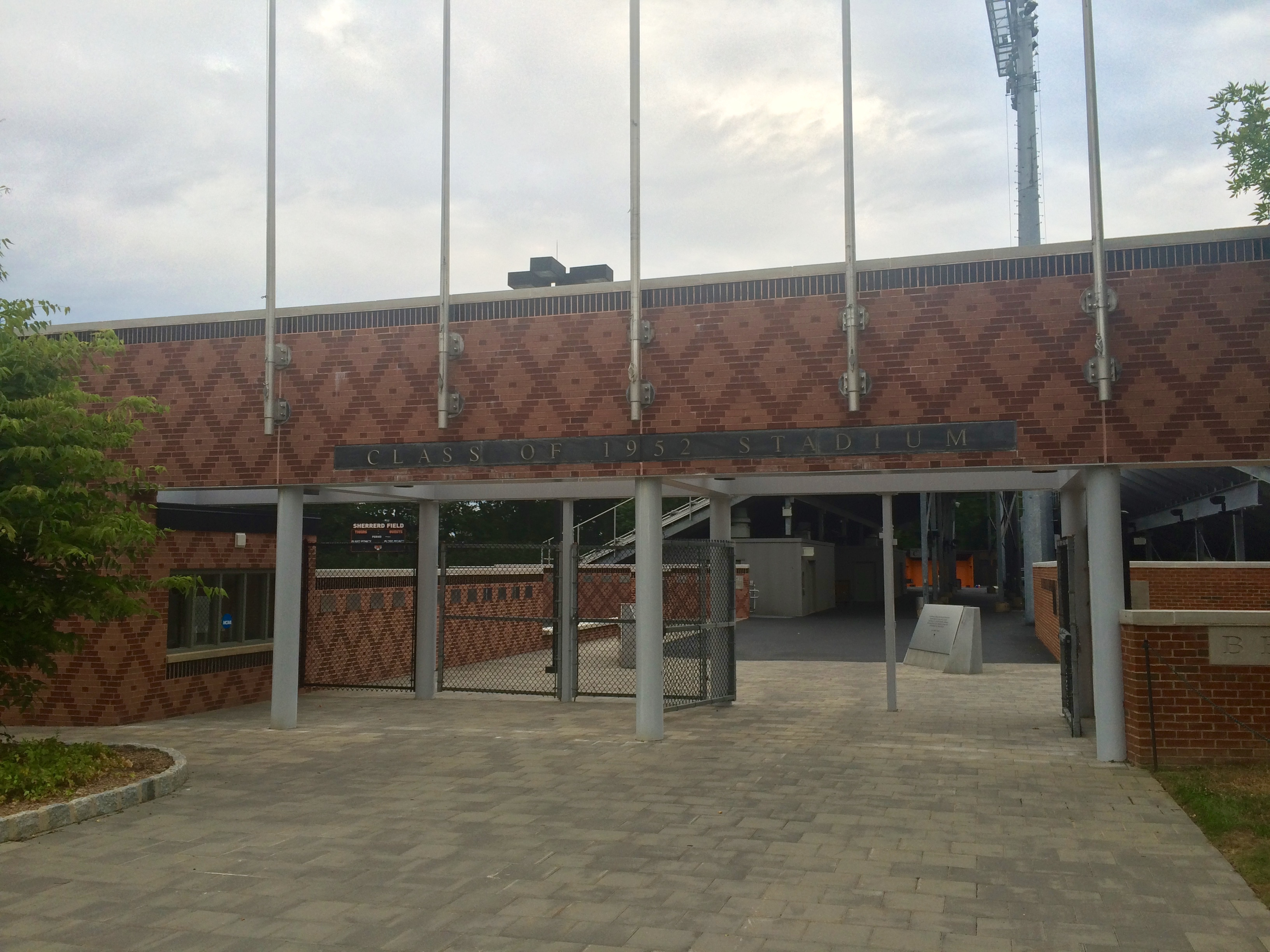
- Interactive map of Class of 1952 Stadium
- Location: Princeton, New Jersey
- Coordinates: 40.34132°N 74.65119°W
- Owner: Princeton University
- Capacity: 4,000
- Surface: FieldTurf

Construction
- Opened: October 14, 1995

Tenants
- Princeton Tigers men's and women's lacrosse, and field hockey teams

The Class of 1952 Stadium is home to Princeton University's women's and men's lacrosse and field hockey teams. The stadium is lighted and fits approximately 4,000.

The stadium was originally dedicated on October 14, 1995.

The field's original astro turf was replaced with a new synthetic turf called FieldTurf in 2012 as part of a renovation that included the naming of the physical field as Sherrerd Field.

The stadium was the home for 34 Ivy League championships and six NCAA championships.
