= Princeton Tigers men's lacrosse =

Collegiate lacrosse team

- Founded: 1882
- University: Princeton University
- Head coach: Matt Madalon (4th season)
- Stadium: Class of 1952 Stadium (capacity: 4,000)
- Location: Princeton, New Jersey
- Conference: Ivy League
- Nickname: Tigers
- Colors: Black and orange

Pre-NCAA era championships
- 1883, 1884, 1888, 1889, 1935, 1937, 1942, 1951, 1953

NCAA Tournament championships
- 1992, 1994, 1996, 1997, 1998, 2001, 2026

NCAA Tournament Runner-Up
- 2000, 2002

NCAA Tournament Final Fours
- 1992, 1993, 1994, 1996, 1997, 1998, 2000, 2001, 2002, 2004, 2022, 2026

NCAA Tournament Quarterfinals
- 1990, 1991, 1992, 1993, 1994, 1995, 1996, 1997, 1998, 2000, 2001, 2002, 2003, 2004, 2006, 2009, 2022, 2025, 2026

NCAA Tournament appearances
- 1990, 1991, 1992, 1993, 1994, 1995, 1996, 1997, 1998, 1999, 2000, 2001, 2002, 2003, 2004, 2006, 2007, 2009, 2010, 2012, 2022, 2023, 2024, 2025, 2026

Conference Tournament championships
- 2010, 2023, 2024, 2026

Conference regular season championships
- 1957, 1958, 1959, 1960, 1961, 1962, 1963, 1964, 1965, 1967, 1992, 1993, 1995, 1996, 1997, 1998, 1999, 2000, 2001, 2002, 2003, 2004, 2006, 2009, 2010, 2012, 2015, 2026

Princeton Tigers men's lacrosse

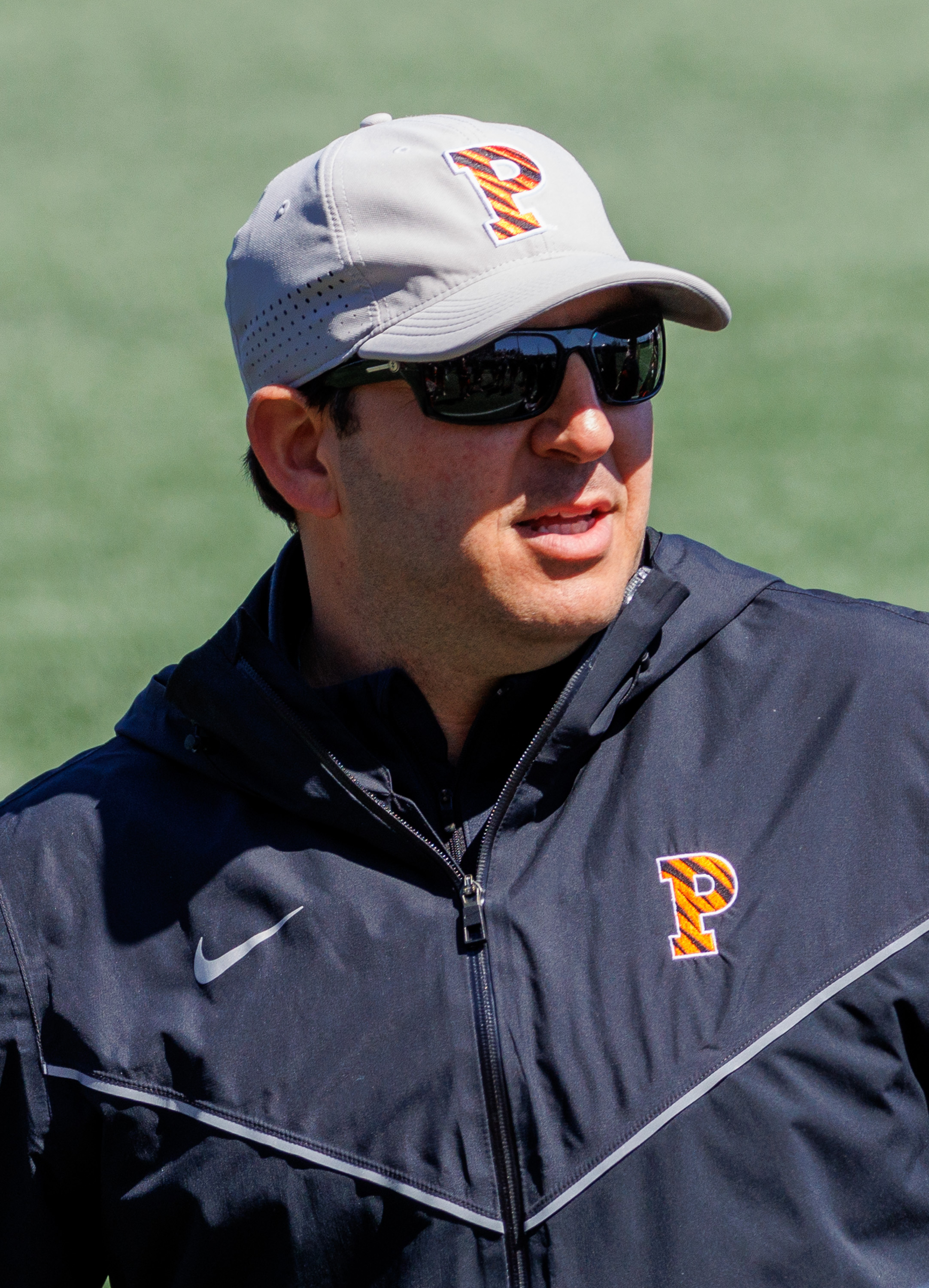
Coach Matt Madalon

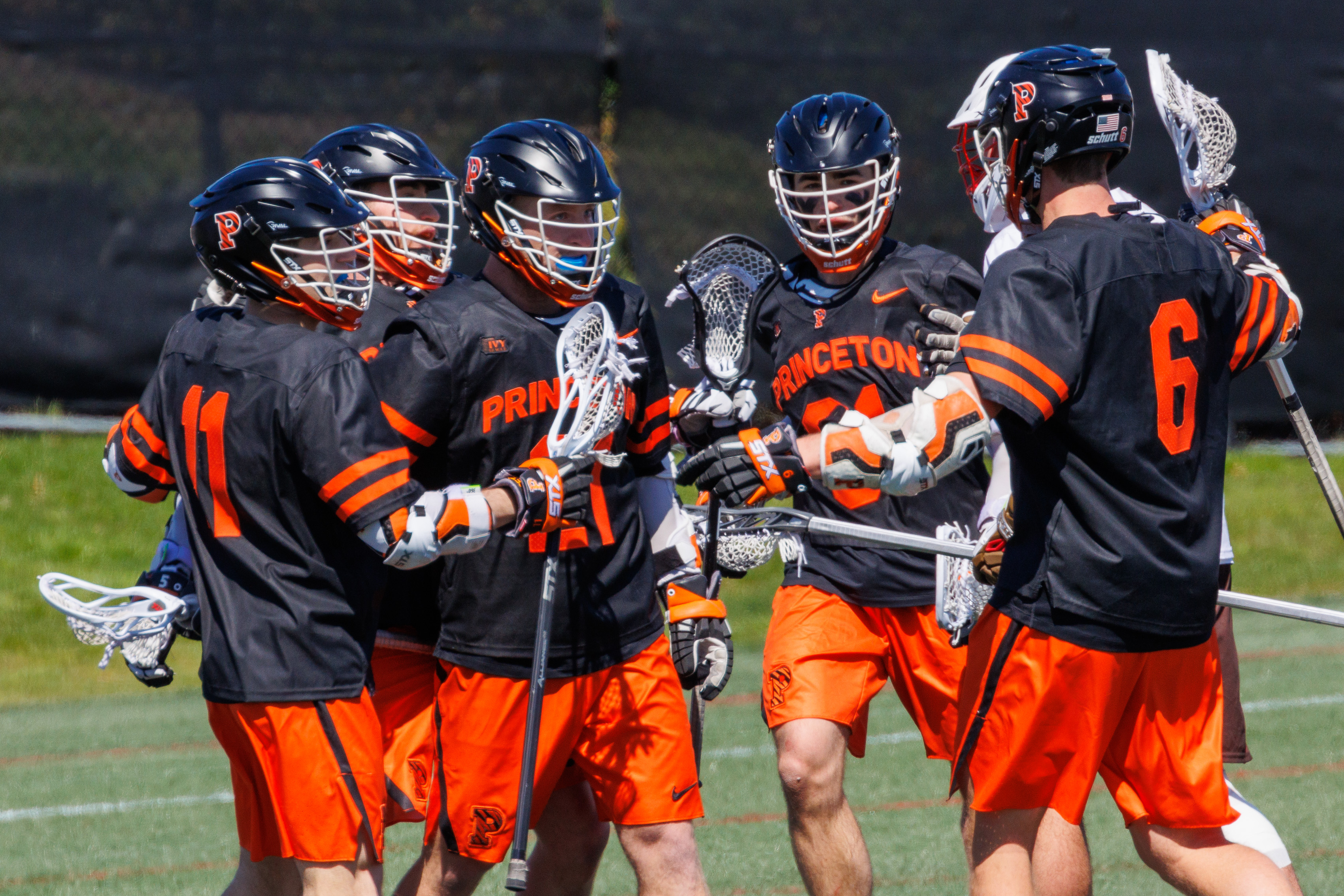
Princeton Tigers players in 2022

The Princeton Tigers men's lacrosse team represents Princeton University in NCAA Division I men's lacrosse play. Princeton currently competes as a member of the Ivy League and plays its home games at the Class of 1952 Stadium in Princeton, New Jersey. The team is currently led by head coach Matt Madalon.

Prior to the NCAA Men's Lacrosse Championship tournament, Princeton was voted as national champion six times, in 1884, 1885, 1937, 1942, 1951, and 1953. Princeton also went undefeated in Ivy League play from 1957 to 1963 (Ivy League lacrosse began in 1956), and tied with Harvard in 1960 in an otherwise perfect season. Between 1957 and 1965, the team won nine consecutive Ivy League titles. The team has since won ten consecutive Ivy League titles from 1995 through 2004. Between 1990 and 2003, Princeton appeared in 14 consecutive NCAA tournaments.

Since 1990, Princeton has won seven NCAA national championships and has qualified for 25 of 36 Division I NCAA Men's Lacrosse Championship tournaments. All six championships were won under former head coach Bill Tierney, who coached the team from 1988 to 2009. Tierney also led the Princeton program to two second-place finishes. In 2010, Chris Bates took over as head coach of the Princeton program. In 2010, Princeton won the inaugural Ivy League Lacrosse Tournament.

== History ==
Princeton has been voted national champion six times (1884, 1885, 1937, 1942, 1951 and 1953). Some sources regard 1937 as the first national championship. Men's lacrosse has been contested in the Ivy League since 1956, initially with only six teams. Brown University began competing in the league in 1964 and Columbia University has never competed in the league. Between 1957 and 1965, Princeton won nine consecutive Ivy League championships. It had undefeated 5–0 conference records every year from 1957 to 1963 except 1960 when it had a tie with Harvard. Between 1967 and 1992, Princeton won no Ivy League championships, while Cornell was the dominant conference power. Until the 1990s, Princeton played at Finney Field. Princeton won seven more Ivy League championships in the 1990s including perfect 6–0 records in 1992, 1993, 1996, 1997, 1998 and 1999. 1997 is regarded as the best in school history with a record number of wins during its 15–0 season and 10 All-Americans plus 13 All-Ivy League selections. Princeton has won 27 Ivy League championships, second to Cornell's 33. Since the Ivy League lacrosse tournament was introduced in 2010 Princeton has won it three times, in 2010, 2023 and 2024. The school has 24 NCAA Division I Championship appearances, and 6 NCAA championships.

Their main Ivy League rivalry is with Cornell. On the non-conference slate is the annual rivalry with Johns Hopkins, first played in 1890 and a constant national fixture since the 1990s. Princeton also plays Rutgers for the Meistrell Cup in honor of Harland (Tots) Meistrell who restarted the dormant lacrosse program at Rutgers in 1920 and then restarted the dormant lacrosse program at Princeton in 1921.

Princeton has had a Top VIII Award winner and two Lt. Raymond Enners Awards for national player of the year. The school has seven Ivy League Players of the Year and nine Ivy League Rookies of the Year. The team has also had numerous national position awardees: five Ensign C. Markland Kelly, Jr. Awards (goaltenders), three Jack Turnbull Awards (attackman), two McLaughlin Awards (midfielder), and six Schmeisser Awards (defenseman). Two Princeton head coaches have won the F. Morris Touchstone Award. Princeton's first first team All-American in 1922.

== Championships ==
From 1936 through 1970, the United States Intercollegiate Lacrosse Association (USILA) awarded the Wingate Memorial Trophy to the annual champion, based on regular-season records. In 1971, the NCAA began hosting an annual men's tournament to determine the national champion. The Wingate Memorial Trophy was presented to the first two NCAA Division I champions (1971 and 1972) and was then retired.

Year	National championships	Coach	Record
1884	ILA National Title		–
1885	ILA National Title		–
1888	ILA National Title		–
1889	ILA National Title		–
1937	USILA Championship (Wingate Memorial Trophy)	Bill Logan	6–2
1942	USILA Championship (Wingate Memorial Trophy)	Logan	7–1
1951	USILA Championship (Wingate Memorial Trophy)	Ferris Thomsen	9–1
1953	USILA Championship (Wingate Memorial Trophy)	Thomsen	8–2
1992	NCAA Division I Men's Lacrosse Championship	Bill Tierney	13–2
1994	NCAA Division I Men's Lacrosse Championship	Tierney	14–1
1996	NCAA Division I Men's Lacrosse Championship	Tierney	14–1
1997	NCAA Division I Men's Lacrosse Championship	Tierney	15–0
1998	NCAA Division I Men's Lacrosse Championship	Tierney	14–1
2001	NCAA Division I Men's Lacrosse Championship	Tierney	14–1

== NCAA Tournament history ==
The following is the complete history of the Princeton Tigers men's lacrosse in the NCAA Division I Men's Lacrosse Championship.

Year	Seed	First round	Quarterfinals	Semifinals	Finals	Notes
12-team tournament
1990	10	Johns Hopkins W 9–8	Yale L 17–8	—	—	—
1991	3	bye	Towson State L 14–13 3OT	—	—	2nd triple overtime in tournament history
1992	3	bye	Maryland W 11–10	North Carolina W 16–14	Syracuse W 10–9 2OT	—First NCAA championship for Princeton —Justin Tortolani becomes Princeton all-time leading goal scorer with game-winner against Maryland —Tierney found to have been excessively verbal with the referees by the NCAA which reprimanded him.
1993	2	bye	Loyola W 12–6	Syracuse L 15–9	—	—
1994	3	bye	Johns Hopkins W 12–11 OT	Brown W 10–7.	Virginia W 9–8 OT	—
1995	6	UMass W 11–6	Syracuse L 15–11	—	—	—
1996	1	bye	Towson State W 22–6.	Syracuse W 11–9	Virginia W 13–12 OT	—
1997	1	bye	UMass W 11–9	Duke W 10–9	Maryland W 19–7	7 of 11 All-Ivy League first team positions. —first NCAA DI men's undefeated season since 1991 —first repeat champions since 1990 (1989 recognized) —third longest winning steak in NCAA Division I lacrosse history
1998	2	bye	Duke W 17–14	Syracuse W 11–10	Maryland W 15–5	—Corey Popham-Trevor Tierney goaltender controversy during tournament. —first threepeat since 1988–90 (recognized 1978–80)
1999	9	Syracuse L 7–5	—	—	—	—
2000	3	bye	Maryland W 10–7	Virginia W 12–11	Syracuse L 13–7	—
2001	2	bye	Loyola W 8–7	Towson W 12–11	Syracuse W 10–9 OT	—
2002	4	bye	Georgetown W 14–13	Johns Hopkins W 11–9	Syracuse L 13–12	—
16-team tournament
2003	4	Albany W 16–10	Syracuse L 15–5	—	—	—
2004	6	Rutgers W 12–4	Maryland W 9–8 OT	Navy L 8–7	—	—
2006	7	UMBC W 11–8	Maryland L 11–6	—	—	—
2007	unseeded	Georgetown L 9–8	—	—	—	—
2009	4	UMass W 10–7	Cornell L 6–4	—	—	—
2010	6	Notre Dame L 8–5	—	—	—	First NCAA tournament home loss for Princeton
2012	unseeded	Virginia L 6–5	—	—	—	—
2022	5	Boston W 12–5	Yale W 14–10	Maryland L 8–13	—	—
2023	unseeded	Penn State L 12–13	—	—	—	—
2024	unseeded	Maryland L 8–16	—	—	—	—
2025	3	Towson W 22–12	Syracuse L 18–19 OT	—	—	—

== Honors ==
The following players have been recognized with conference or national honors and awards for their play:

Top VIII Award

- Josh Sims (2000)

Lt. Raymond Enners Award (Player of the Year)

- David Morrow (1993)
- Scott Bacigalupo(1994)

Schmeisser Award (Defenseman of the Year)

- Tyler Campbell (1942)
- Fred Allner, Jr. (1947)
- David Morrow (1992, 1993)
- Christian Cook (1998)
- Ryan Mollett (2001)

McLaughlin Award (Midfielder of the Year)

- Josh Sims (1998, 2000)

Jack Turnbull Award (Attackman of the Year)

- Don Hahn (1951)
- Kevin Lowe (1994)
- Jon Hess (1997)

Ensign C. Markland Kelly, Jr. Award (Goaltender of the Year)

- Scott Bacigalupo (1992, 1993, 1994)
- Trevor Tierney (2001)
- Alex Hewit (2006)

Ivy League Men's Player of the Year

- Kevin Lowe, A (1994)
- Jesse Hubbard, A (1996)
- Jon Hess, A (1997)
- Josh Sims, M (2000)
- Ryan Mollett, D (2001)
- Ryan Boyle, A (2002, 2004)

Ivy League Men's Rookie of the Year

- Torr Marro, M (1990)
- Scott Bacigalupo, G (1991)
- Jesse Hubbard, M (1995)
- B. J. Prager, A (1999)
- Ryan Boyle, A (2001)
- Peter Trombino, A (2004)
- Dan Cocoziello, D (2005)
- Jack McBride, A (2008)
- Mike Chanenchuk, M (2010)
- Tom Schreiber, M (2011)

Three-time All-Ivy

- Phil Allen (1960–61–620
- Dave Tickner (1975-76-77)
- Scott Bacigalupo (1991-92-93)
- David Morrow (1991-92-93)
- Kevin Lowe (1992-93-94)
- Jesse Hubbard (1996-97-98)
- Josh Sims (1998-99-00)
- B.J. Prager (1999-00-02)

NCAA Tournament Most Outstanding Player

- Scott Bacigalupo (1992, 1994)
- Jon Hess (1997)
- Corey Popham (1998)
- B.J. Prager (2001)

Two-time All-Americans

- Charles W. B. Wardell, Jr. (1934–35)
- M. Tyler Campbell (1941–42)
- Leonard M. Gaines, Jr. (1946–47)
- Frederick A. Allner, Jr. (1947–48)
- Donald P. Hahn (1950–51)
- Douglas G. Levick III (1957–58)
- Timothy C. Callard (1962–63)
- John D. Baker (1966–67)
- Scott S. Bacigalupo (1992-93-94)
- David K. Morrow (1992–93)
- Todd B. Higgins (1994–95)
- Jesse H. Hubbard (1996, 1998)
- Jonathan A. Hess (1997–98)
- Joshua S. Sims (1998–99–2000)
- Ryan J. Boyle (2003–04)

CoSIDA Academic All-America

First Team

- Tom Barnds (1990)
- Justin Tortolani (1991, 1992)
- Josh Sims (2000)

Second Team

- Scott Reinhardt (1994)
- Josh Sims (1999)

=== National Lacrosse Hall of Fame ===
National Lacrosse Hall of Fame inductees:

Induction year	Name	Inducted as
1961	William J. Harkness	Player
1961	Conrad Sutherland	Player
1962	Harland W. Meistrell	Player
1973	Tyler Campbell	Player
1980	Alvin B. Krongard	Player
1981	Donald P. Hahn	Player
1982	Frederick A. Allner	Player
1982	Ralph N. Willis	Player
1984	Leonard T. Gaines	Player
1985	Howard J. Krongard	Player
1987	Henry E. Fish	Player
1998	Charles D. Murphy	Contributor
2002	William G. Tierney	Coach
2008	Chris Sailer	Coach
2009	Kevin Lowe	Player
2010	Scott Bacigalupo	Player

== Statistical accomplishments ==
Michael Sowers holds the school career scoring record with 302 points (2017–20), as well as the single-season record with 90 (2019). Jesse Hubbard holds the career record for goals scored with 163 (1995–98), while Gavin McBride holds the single season record with 54 (2015). Sowers also holds the career assists record with 181, and the single-season record with 56 (2018). Scott Bacigalupo holds the career saves record with 732 (1991–94), while William Cronin holds the single-season record with 277 (1973).

Matt Bailer holds the NCAA Division I record for face-off percentage as one of nine players to have won all of his face-offs in a game where he participated in 10 or more (12 face-offs, 4/15/00, vs. Harvard). No other Tigers currently hold records, but Trevor Tierney formerly held the single-season goals against average (2001–2006, 5.70) and career goals against average (2001–2006, 6.65) NCAA records, while Kevin Gray held the career saves per game record (1977–1994, 15.64) and William Cronin held the career saves per game (1974–1977, 14.43) record.

Numerous Tiger lacrosse players have been NCAA national statistical champions. Ryan Boyle leads the way as a former champion in several statistics: points per game (2003, 4.54), assists per game (2003, 3.77), assists per game (2004, 2.93), assists (2003, 49), assists (2004, 44). Trevor Tierney was twice a national statistical champion: goals against average (2001, 5.70) and save percentage (2001, .671). Additionally, Jon Hess (assists per game, 1998, 2.60), Patrick Cairns (goals against average, 1997, 6.44) and Corey Popham (goals against average, 1999, 7.07) have been national statistical champions.

The team has also led the nation on several occasions, including the following: scoring defense (1997, 6.87; 1998, 7.60; 1999, 7.15; 2001, 5.80; 2007, 6.21), scoring margin (1996, 8.27; 1998, 6.87) and winning percentage (1997, 15–0 – 1.000, 1998, 14–1 – .933, 2001, 14–1 – .933). The Princeton teams of the late 1990s were second only to the Cornell teams of the 1970s in terms of consecutive victories: consecutive victories: (3/16/96-3/7/98, 29, Cornell-42) and consecutive conference victories: (4/29/95-3/30/02, 37, Cornell-39).

In addition to national records, Princeton holds the following Ivy League records based on conference play. Ryan Boyle holds several individual conference records: single-season assists (32, 2003), career assists (86, 2001–04) and career points (120, 2001–04). The team holds conference records for single-game goals allowed (1, vs Penn, 1970) and single-season goals allowed (12, 1957).

== Season results ==
The following is a list of Princeton's results by season as an NCAA Division I program:

Season	Coach	Overall	Conference	Standing	Postseason
Art Robinson (Ivy League) (1971–1976)
1971	Art Robinson	1–11	1–5	6th	
1972	Art Robinson	5–7	2–4	5th	
1973	Art Robinson	6–10	2–4	T–4th	
1974	Art Robinson	6–8	3–3	4th	
1975	Art Robinson	8–6	4–2	3rd	
1976	Art Robinson	6–7	3–3	T–3rd	
Art Robinson:		32–49 (.395)	15–21 (.417)		
Mike Hanna (Ivy League) (1977–1981)
1977	Mike Hanna	6–6	4–2	3rd	
1978	Mike Hanna	4–8	3–3	T–3rd	
1979	Mike Hanna	6–6	4–2	T–2nd	
1980	Mike Hanna	7–6	4–2	3rd	
1981	Mike Hanna	8–5	4–2	T–2nd	
Mike Hanna:		31–31 (.500)	19–11 (.633)		
Jerry Schmidt (Ivy League) (1982–1987)
1982	Jerry Schmidt	8–6	4–2	T–2nd	
1983	Jerry Schmidt	7–6	3–3	T–4th	
1984	Jerry Schmidt	2–11	1–5	T–6th	
1985	Jerry Schmidt	6–9	2–4	5th	
1986	Jerry Schmidt	1–14	1–5	T–6th	
1987	Jerry Schmidt	3–12	1–5	6th	
Jerry Schmidt:		27–58 (.318)	12–24 (.333)		
Bill Tierney (Ivy League) (1988–2009)
1988	Bill Tierney	2–13	0–6	7th	
1989	Bill Tierney	6–8	2–4	T–5th	
1990	Bill Tierney	11–5	4–2	3rd	NCAA Division I Quarterfinals
1991	Bill Tierney	12–3	5–1	2nd	NCAA Division I Quarterfinals
1992	Bill Tierney	13–2	6–0	1st	NCAA Division I Champion
1993	Bill Tierney	13–2	6–0	1st	NCAA Division I Final Four
1994	Bill Tierney	14–1	5–1	2nd	NCAA Division I Champion
1995	Bill Tierney	11–4	5–1	T–1st	NCAA Division I Quarterfinals
1996	Bill Tierney	14–1	6–0	1st	NCAA Division I Champion
1997	Bill Tierney	15–0	6–0	1st	NCAA Division I Champion
1998	Bill Tierney	14–1	6–0	1st	NCAA Division I Champion
1999	Bill Tierney	9–4	6–0	1st	NCAA Division I First Round
2000	Bill Tierney	12–3	6–0	1st	NCAA Division I Runner–Up
2001	Bill Tierney	14–1	6–0	1st	NCAA Division I Champion
2002	Bill Tierney	10–5	5–1	1st	NCAA Division I Runner–Up
2003	Bill Tierney	11–4	5–1	T–1st	NCAA Division I Quarterfinals
2004	Bill Tierney	11–4	5–1	T–1st	NCAA Division I Final Four
2005	Bill Tierney	5–7	4–2	T–2nd	
2006	Bill Tierney	11–5	5–1	T–1st	NCAA Division I Quarterfinals
2007	Bill Tierney	10–4	5–1	2nd	NCAA Division I First Round
2008	Bill Tierney	7–6	4–2	3rd	
2009	Bill Tierney	13–3	5–1	T–1st	NCAA Division I Quarterfinals
Bill Tierney:		238–86 (.735)	107–25 (.811)		
Chris Bates (Ivy League) (2010–2016)
2010	Chris Bates	11–5	4–2	T–1st	NCAA Division I First Round
2011	Chris Bates	4–8	2–4	T–5th	
2012	Chris Bates	11–5	6–0	1st	NCAA Division I First Round
2013	Chris Bates	9–6	3–3	T–3rd	
2014	Chris Bates	7–6	2–4	T–5th	
2015	Chris Bates	9–6	4–2	T–1st	
2016	Bates & Madalon	5–8*	2–4*	5th	
Chris Bates:		53–42* (.558)	21–18* (.538)		
Matt Madalon (Ivy League) (2016–present)
2017	Matt Madalon	9–6	4–2	T–2nd	
2018	Matt Madalon	8–5	3–3	T–3rd	
2019	Matt Madalon	7–7	2–4	5th	
2020	Matt Madalon	5–0	0–0	†	†
2021	Matt Madalon	0–0	0–0	††	††
2022	Matt Madalon	11–5	3–3	T–3rd	NCAA Division I Final Four
2023	Matt Madalon	8–7	4–2	T–2nd	NCAA Division I First Round
2024	Matt Madalon	11–5	4–2	T–2nd	NCAA Division I First Round
2025	Matt Madalon	13–4	5–1	2nd	NCAA Division I Quarterfinals
2026	Matt Madalon	14–2	5–1	T–1st	NCAA Division I Champion
Matt Madalon:		89–43* (.656)	32–19* (.627)		
Total:		778–525-18 (.596)			
National champion Postseason invitational champion Conference regular season champion Conference regular season and conference tournament champion Division regular season champion Division regular season and conference tournament champion Conference tournament champion

† NCAA canceled 2020 collegiate activities due to the COVID-19 pandemic.
†† Ivy League cancelled the 2021 collegiate season due to the COVID-19 pandemic.

- Matt Madalon took over the head coaching position on the 9th game of the 2016 season. Chris Bates' 2–6 (0–3) mark from that season has been credited to his overall record, while Madalon's 3–2 (2–1) mark has been credited to his overall record.
